= Mike McShane (ice hockey) =

Biographical details
- Born: September 27, 1947 (age 79); Wakefield, Massachusetts, U.S.
- Education: University of New Hampshire

Playing career
- 1968–1971: New Hampshire
- Position: Center

Coaching career (HC unless noted)
- 1971–1972: Phillips Exeter Academy
- 1972–1978: New Hampton School
- 1978–1980: Dartmouth (assistant)
- 1980–1985: St. Lawrence
- 1985–1994: Providence
- 1995–2018: Norwich

Head coaching record
- Overall: 742–349–69 (.669)

Accomplishments and honors

Championships
- 1983 ECAC West Division Champion; 1999 ECAC East Champion; 1999 ECAC East tournament champion 2000 ECAC East Champion; 2000 ECAC East tournament champion 2000 NCAA national champion 2001 ECAC East Champion; 2002 ECAC East Champion; 2002 ECAC East tournament champion 2003 ECAC East Champion; 2003 ECAC East tournament champion 2003 NCAA national champion 2004 ECAC East Champion; 2004 ECAC East tournament champion 2005 ECAC East Champion; 2006 ECAC East Champion; 2006 ECAC East tournament champion 2007 ECAC East Champion; 2008 ECAC East Champion; 2008 ECAC East tournament champion 2009 ECAC East Champion; 2010 ECAC East Champion; 2010 ECAC East tournament champion 2010 NCAA national champion 2011 ECAC East Champion; 2011 ECAC East tournament champion 2012 ECAC East Champion; 2012 ECAC East tournament champion 2013 ECAC East Champion; 2014 ECAC East Champion; 2015 ECAC East Champion; 2015 ECAC East tournament champion 2017 NEHC Champion; 2017 NEHC tournament champion 2017 NCAA national champion

Awards
- 1997 Edward Jeremiah Award; 1999 Edward Jeremiah Award; 2000 Edward Jeremiah Award; 2010 Edward Jeremiah Award; 2017 Edward Jeremiah Award

Records
- 17 consecutive conference titles

Mike McShane (born September 27, 1947) is an American college men's ice hockey coach. He ranks ninth all-time among NCAA men's ice hockey coaches with 653 wins in 30 years as a head coach. As the head coach at Norwich University from 1996 to 2018, he led his teams to the Frozen Four nine times and NCAA Division III national championships in 2000, 2003, 2010 and 2017.

== Athlete ==
McShane grew up in Wakefield, Massachusetts and attended Wakefield High School and Tabor Academy. He attended the University of New Hampshire where he was the assistant captain of the UNH hockey team. He was also named to the New England all-star team, and became the third-leading scorer in New Hampshire Wildcats' history.

== Coaching career ==
=== Exeter and New Hampton ===
After graduating from UNH in 1971, McShane coached at Exeter Academy for one year and for six years at New Hampton School in New Hampton, New Hampshire. In six years at New Hampton, McShane compiled a 122-26-2 record and led the school to three Division I Prep Championships.

=== Dartmouth College ===
McShane was hired as an assistant hockey coach at Dartmouth College in 1978 and was part of the coaching staff on Dartmouth teams that played in the Frozen Four in 1978 and 1980.

=== St. Lawrence University ===
McShane was hired by St. Lawrence University as its head hockey coach in 1980. In five years as head coach, he led the St. Lawrence Saints ice hockey teams to one NCAA tournament berth and four straight appearances in the Eastern College Athletic Conference Division One tournament.

=== Providence College ===
In July 1985, McShane signed a multiyear contract to serve as the head ice hockey coach at Providence College. At the time of his hiring, Providence College athletic director Lou Lamoriello called McShane "probably one of the strongest people I've met in the coaching ranks ... a tireless worker and, most important, he's the type of person we want to represent us at Providence College." McShane spent nine years as the hockey coach at Providence, including four consecutive seasons with at least 21 wins between 1989 and 1992. He was named the New England Coach of the Year in 1989.

=== Norwich University ===
During the 1994–1995 season, McShane worked as a consultant for the Ottawa Senators, and took time off to complete a master's degree program at Boston University. In the fall of 1995, McShane became the head hockey coach, golf coach and rink manager at Norwich University in Northfield, Vermont. In December 1995, McShane told the Boston Herald, "People asked me why I'd want to go up here. Hey, I worked in the woods before. It's a great spot. They're great kids. It's a unique atmosphere." After a 12–12 record in his first season at Norwich, McShane has strung together 21 consecutive winning seasons from 1997 to 2017. His Norwich teams advanced to the Frozen Four eight times and won NCAA Division III national championships in 2000, 2003, 2010, and 2017.

McShane led Norwich to its third national championship in March 2010 with a 2–1 in double-overtime win over St. Norbert College in the longest game (99 minutes, 29 seconds) in Division III championship history. After the game, McShane said, "The kids played great. It was wild, crazy. It was a beautiful goal. Serino made a great play to keep the puck in and put it down low to Thomas. He threw it out front. (Cotnoir) got a whack at it and then got the rebound. Bam! What an atmosphere. Some years you get lucky."

In 2014, McShane's longtime assistant coach Steve Mattson was honored as the recipient of the prestigious Terry Flanagan Award. The Flanagan Award presented by the American Hockey Coaches Association (AHCA) and is named in honor of the former New Hampshire player and Bowling Green assistant coach and has been given annually since 1997 to honor an assistant coaches' career body of work. Mattson is just the second Division III coach to win the award in the 18-year history.

McShane announced his retirement from Norwich as Head Coach on June 15, 2018.

=== Career records and honors ===
In 36 years as a head coach, McShane compiled a record of 721 wins, 343 losses, and 66 ties. He has received the Edward Jeremiah Award five times (1997, 1999, 2000, 2010, and 2017). The award is presented each year by the American Hockey Coaches Association to the Division III men's ice hockey Coach of the Year. McShane and Bill Beaney are the only coaches to have received the award four times. At the end of the 2009-2010 hockey season, McShane ranked ninth all-time among college men's ice hockey coaches.

McShane has coached a number of players who went on to professional hockey careers, including Tom Fitzgerald, Rob Gaudreau, Craig Darby, Chris Therien, Joe Hulbig, Hal Gill, Chris Terreri, Keith Aucoin, Randy Sexton, Marc Bellemare, and Kurtis McLean.

== Head coaching record ==
=== College ===
Record table
| Season | Team | Overall | Conference | Standing | Postseason |
|---|---|---|---|---|---|
St. Lawrence Saints (ECAC Hockey) (1980–1985)
| 1980–81 | St. Lawrence | 15–16–2 | 9–12–1 | 12th | |
| 1981–82 | St. Lawrence | 19–11–1 | 12–8–1 | 6th | ECAC Quarterfinals |
| 1982–83 | St. Lawrence | 23–12–1 | 14–6–0 | 4th | NCAA Quarterfinals |
| 1983–84 | St. Lawrence | 19–13–0 | 10–10–0 | t-9th | |
| 1984–85 | St. Lawrence | 17–13–2 | 12–9–0 | 6th | ECAC Quarterfinals |
| St. Lawrence: | | 93–65–6 | 57–45–2 | | |
Providence Friars (Hockey East) (1985–1994)
| 1985–86 | Providence | 14–24–1 | 11–22–1 | 4th | Hockey East Consolation Game (loss) |
| 1986–87 | Providence | 7–23–3 | 7–22–3 | 6th | Hockey East Quarterfinals |
| 1987–88 | Providence | 13–18–5 | 8–13–5 | 6th | Hockey East Semifinals |
| 1988–89 | Providence | 22–18–2 | 13–8–2 | t-3rd | Hockey East Consolation Game (win) |
| 1989–90 | Providence | 22–10–3 | 11–7–3 | 4th | Hockey East Quarterfinals |
| 1990–91 | Providence | 22–12–2 | 10–9–2 | t-4th | Hockey East Semifinals |
| 1991–92 | Providence | 21–13–2 | 11–8–2 | 3rd† | Hockey East Semifinals |
| 1992–93 | Providence | 16–16–4 | 9–12–3 | t-4th | Hockey East Quarterfinals |
| 1993–94 | Providence | 14–19–3 | 9–13–2 | 5th | Hockey East Quarterfinals |
| Providence: | | 151–153–25 | 89–114–18 | | |
Norwich Cadets (ECAC East) (1995–2015)
| 1995–96 | Norwich | 12–12–0 | 8–11–0 | 12th | |
| 1996–97 | Norwich | 21–7–2 | 15–3–1 | 2nd | NCAA third-place game (loss) |
| 1997–98 | Norwich | 13–12–2 | 9–8–2 | T–10th | |
| 1998–99 | Norwich | 27–2–2 | 15–1–1 | 1st | NCAA third-place game (win) |
| 1999–00 | Norwich | 29–2–1 | 16–0–1 | 1st | NCAA national champion |
| 2000–01 | Norwich | 18–9–1 | 13–3–1 | 1st | ECAC East Runner-Up |
| 2001–02 | Norwich | 27–5–0 | 15–4–0 | 1st | NCAA runner-up |
| 2002–03 | Norwich | 27–3–0 | 16–3–0 | 1st | NCAA national champion |
| 2003–04 | Norwich | 24–4–0 | 16–2–0 | 1st | NCAA Frozen Four |
| 2004–05 | Norwich | 18–5–3 | 15–2–2 | 1st | ECAC East Semifinals |
| 2005–06 | Norwich | 22–5–2 | 15–2–2 | 1st | NCAA Quarterfinals |
| 2006–07 | Norwich | 20–8–0 | 14–5–0 | 1st | NCAA Quarterfinals |
| 2007–08 | Norwich | 23–7–0 | 15–4–0 | 1st | NCAA Frozen Four |
| 2008–09 | Norwich | 13–8–4 | 11–5–3 | 1st | ECAC East Quarterfinals |
| 2009–10 | Norwich | 26–1–4 | 16–1–2 | 1st | NCAA national champion |
| 2010–11 | Norwich | 22–6–3 | 15–1–3 | 1st | NCAA Frozen Four |
| 2011–12 | Norwich | 24–3–2 | 15–2–1 | 1st | NCAA Frozen Four |
| 2012–13 | Norwich | 24–4–1 | 16–1–1 | 1st | NCAA Frozen Four |
| 2013–14 | Norwich | 20–7–3 | 13–3–2 | t-1st | NCAA Quarterfinals |
| 2014–15 | Norwich | 25–4–1 | 17–1–0 | 1st | NCAA Quarterfinals |
| Norwich: | | 435–114–31 | | | |
Norwich Cadets (NEHC) (2015–2018)
| 2015–16 | Norwich | 17–8–2 | 12–6–2 | 3rd | NEHC Semifinals |
| 2016–17 | Norwich | 27–1–3 | 18–1–1 | 1st | NCAA national champion |
| 2017–18 | Norwich | 19–7–2 | 13–3–2 | 1st | NEHC Runner-up |
| Norwich: | | 63–18–7 | 43–10–5 | | |
| Total: | | 742–349–69 | | | |
National champion Postseason invitational champion Conference regular season champion Conference regular season and conference tournament champion Division regular season champion Division regular season and conference tournament champion Conference tournament champion

† Providence finished the season in 3rd place but was surpassed by Boston University after Maine was retroactively forced to forfeit 13 games.

== Family ==
McShane is married to Shawn McShane and resides in Montpelier, Vermont. He has two adult children, Daniel and Megan.

== See also ==
- List of college men's ice hockey coaches with 400 wins

Awards and achievements
| Preceded by Dean Talafous; Mike Schwartz; Dominick Dawes; Chris Schultz/Peter Belisle | Edward Jeremiah Award; 1996–97; 1998–99, 1999–00; 2009–10; 2016–17 | Succeeded by Mike Schwartz; Wayne Wilson; Tim Coghlin; Blaise MacDonald |
