= Chris Schultz (ice hockey) =

American ice hockey coach

Current position
- Title: Head coach
- Team: Geneseo State
- Conference: SUNYAC

Biographical details
- Born: Chili, New York, U.S.
- Education: State University of New York at Geneseo

Playing career
- 1993–1997: Geneseo State
- Position: Forward

Coaching career (HC unless noted)
- 2000–2003: Geneseo State (asst.)
- 2003–2006: Aquinas Institute
- 2006–present: Geneseo State

Head coaching record
- Overall: 259–122–28 (.667)
- Tournaments: 8–5 (.615)

Accomplishments and honors

Championships
- 2014 SUNYAC champion 2016 SUNYAC tournament champion 2018 SUNYAC tournament champion 2019 SUNYAC champion 2019 SUNYAC tournament champion 2020 SUNYAC champion 2020 SUNYAC tournament champion 2022 SUNYAC champion 2022 SUNYAC tournament champion

Awards
- 2014 Edward Jeremiah Award; 2016 Edward Jeremiah Award

Chris Schultz is an American ice hockey coach and former player who was twice named the NCAA Division III coach of the year.

== Career ==
Schultz began his college career in 1993 and played four years for the ice hockey team at Geneseo State. Schultz was a two-year captain of the Ice Knights and his playing days ended upon his graduation with dual degree in special education and history. He returned to his alma mater three years later as an assistant coach under current RIT associate coach, Brian Hills. He remained with the club for three seasons before taking over at his high school alma mater, the Aquinas Institute.

In 2006, after losing Jason Lammers to Division I, Geneseo hired Schultz as their new head coach. He was taking over a program that had won two consecutive SUNYAC titles and appeared primed to make the next step in the NCAA tournament. Schultz became the third head coach in three seasons for the Ice Knights and this took a toll on recruiting. Unfortunately, the team regressed in his second season and the club posted a sub .500 record in his second season, the only sub .500 of his career to date. While the team improved markedly the following year, the program was hit with a postseason ban in 2010 because the university had used financial aid grants to entice Canadian players to the school. Of the 21 grants awarded to Canadian students, 19 went to members of the ice hockey team.

Despite the university's unintentional infraction, Schultz remained with the team and the program began to consistently rise over the course of several years. In 2014, Schultz led the team to their first ever regular season SUNYAC title and, though they lost in the title game of their conference tournament, they earned one of the three at-large NCAA bids. The Knights won the program's first two NCAA games versus Nichols and Norwich to reach the Frozen Four (Lewiston, Maine) for the first time and, though they lost to eventual champion St. Norbert, Schultz was selected as the National Coach of the Year. In 2016, the Knights won the SUNYAC final, beat Salve Regina and Williams College, earning a spot once again in the Frozen Four (Lake Placid) and was once again a recipient of the Edward Jeremiah Award National Coach of the Year, though this time the honor was shared with Peter Belisle. In 2019, after winning the SUNYAC once again, the Knights found themselves back in the Frozen Four (Stevens-Point, Wisconsin) after defeating Manhattanville College. The Knights eventually fell to Norwich University in the national semifinal game. The three appearances in the national semifinal helped raise the profile of the program but Schultz didn't stop there. Beginning in 2018, Geneseo State won four consecutive SUNYAC Tournament titles, including 5 of out of 6 years holding the crown, and made the Frozen Four in consecutive tournaments (discounting the cancellations due to COVID-19). In 2022 he led the Knights to the NCAA Division III National Championship game in Lake Placid for the first time where they ultimately fell to Adrian. Schultz is the only head coach in Geneseo hockey history to have won any NCAA tournament games. In addition to the aforementioned national coach of the year awards, Schultz is also a five-time SUNYAC Coach of the Year recipient, a Rochester Press-Radio Club Coach of the Year (2019), and was inducted into the Aquinas Institute Hall of Fame in 2017.

== Statistics ==
=== Regular season and playoffs ===
			Regular Season					Playoffs
Season	Team	League	GP	G	A	Pts	PIM	GP	G	A	Pts	PIM
1993–94	Geneseo State	SUNYAC	—	—	—	—	—	—	—	—	—	—
1994–95	Geneseo State	SUNYAC	—	—	—	—	—	—	—	—	—	—
1995–96	Geneseo State	SUNYAC	24	8	13	21	32	—	—	—	—	—
1996–97	Geneseo State	SUNYAC	22	4	8	12	10	—	—	—	—	—
NCAA totals			—	26	29	55	—	—	—	—	—	—

== Head coaching record ==
Record table
Season	Team	Overall	Conference	Standing	Postseason
Geneseo State Knights (SUNYAC) (2006–present)
2006–07	Geneseo State	16–10–0	10–4–0	2nd	SUNYAC Semifinals
2007–08	Geneseo State	8–17–0	6–10–0	7th	
2008–09	Geneseo State	14–12–1	8–7–1	3rd	SUNYAC Semifinals
2009–10	Geneseo State	13–10–2	9–6–1	4th	Postseason ban
2010–11	Geneseo State	16–8–2	10–5–1	2nd	SUNYAC Semifinals
2011–12	Geneseo State	13–12–1	7–8–1	T–4th	SUNYAC Quarterfinals
2012–13	Geneseo State	17–9–1	11–4–1	3rd	SUNYAC Semifinals
2013–14	Geneseo State	23–7–0	14–2–0	1st	NCAA National Semifinal
2014–15	Geneseo State	12–10–4	9–6–1	3rd	SUNYAC Quarterfinals
2015–16	Geneseo State	20–5–6	9–2–5	T–2nd	NCAA National Semifinal
2016–17	Geneseo State	17–7–3	10–5–1	T–2nd	SUNYAC Semifinals
2017–18	Geneseo State	20–6–3	10–3–3	2nd	NCAA National Quarterfinal
2018–19	Geneseo State	25–2–2	13–1–2	1st	NCAA National Semifinal
2019–20	Geneseo State	22–3–2	13–1–2	1st	NCAA tournament cancelled
2021–22	Geneseo State	23–4–1	12–2–1	1st	NCAA National Runner-Up
Geneseo State:		259–122–28	151–66–20		
Total:		259–122–28			
National champion Postseason invitational champion Conference regular season champion Conference regular season and conference tournament champion Division regular season champion Division regular season and conference tournament champion Conference tournament champion

Awards and achievements
Preceded by Matt Loen; Jack Arena	Edward Jeremiah Award; 2013–14; 2015–16 (with Peter Belisle)	Succeeded by Jack Arena; Mike McShane
