= Jack Arena =

American ice hockey coach

Current position
- Title: Head coach (ice hockey)
- Team: Amherst
- Conference: NESCAC

Biographical details
- Born: Randolph, Massachusetts, U.S.
- Education: Amherst College

Coaching career (HC unless noted)

Ice hockey
- 1983–present: Amherst

Golf
- 1994–2020: Amherst

Head coaching record
- Overall: 489–359–78 (ice hockey)

Accomplishments and honors

Awards
- 2012 Edward Jeremiah Award; 2015 Edward Jeremiah Award

Jack Arena is an American ice hockey coach. He has spent his career at Amherst College where he has amassed over 400 wins, several ECAC and NESCAC championships, and multiple NCAA Tournament appearances, including two NCAA Final Four appearances. Arena has also been dubbed NESCAC Coach of the Year, New England Hockey Writers ECAC East Coach of the Year, as well as the prestigious Edward Jeremiah Award for National Coach of the Year.

Arena has also served as a coach for football and baseball at Amherst, and is currently the head coach of the golf team as well.

== Personal life ==
Born in Randolph, Massachusetts, Arena attended Milton Academy before heading off to Amherst College as a student. At Amherst, he was a four-year member of both the men's ice hockey and baseball teams (1979–1983). Arena was hired as head coach for the ice hockey team immediately following his senior year. Arena still stands tied for fourth on Amherst's all-time scoring list.

Arena now resides on the campus of the Northfield Mount Hermon School, where he lives with his wife, Diane, and his four children, Emily, Patrick, John and Ellen.

== College head coaching record ==
Record table
Season	Team	Overall	Conference	Standing	Postseason
Amherst Lord Jeffs (ECAC 3) (1983–1985)
1983–84	Amherst	17–6–1	13–1–0	1st	ECAC 3 Runner–Up
1984–85	Amherst	15–8–1	12–3–1	5th	ECAC 3 Semifinals
Amherst:		32–14–2	25–4–1		
Amherst Lord Jeffs (ECAC North/South) (1985–1992)
1985–86	Amherst	11–12–0	8–7–0	15th	ECAC South Quarterfinals
1986–87	Amherst	7–16–0	5–10–0	T–20th	
1987–88	Amherst	5–17–1	5–11–1	23rd	
1988–89	Amherst	16–12–0	10–6–0	14th	ECAC South Semifinals
1989–90	Amherst	11–11–1	11–7–0	T–9th	ECAC South Quarterfinals
1990–91	Amherst	13–12–1	11–7–0	8th	ECAC South Runner-Up
1991–92	Amherst	13–11–2	10–4–1	4th	ECAC North/South Champion
Amherst:		76–91–5	60–52–2		
Amherst Lord Jeffs (ECAC East) (1992–1999)
1992–93	Amherst	12–9–2	1–8–2	18th	
1993–94	Amherst	6–14–2	5–10–2	T–12th	
1994–95	Amherst	6–15–1	4–12–1	14th	
1995–96	Amherst	17–9–0	13–6–0	6th	ECAC East Champion
1996–97	Amherst	14–10–1	11–7–1	6th	ECAC East Quarterfinals
1997–98	Amherst	10–12–1	8–12–1	13th	ECAC East Quarterfinals
1998–99	Amherst	19–5–0	14–3–0	2nd	NCAA Quarterfinals
Amherst:		84–74–7	56–58–7		
Amherst Lord Jeffs (NESCAC) (1999–2015)
1999–00	Amherst	15–6–3	11–4–2	5th	NESCAC Quarterfinals
2000–01	Amherst	18–5–3	12–2–3	2nd	NESCAC Runner-Up
2001–02	Amherst	6–14–5	6–9–4	2nd	NESCAC Quarterfinals
2002–03	Amherst	7–13–5	7–8–4	T–6th	NESCAC Quarterfinals
2003–04	Amherst	11–11–3	6–10–2	8th	NESCAC Quarterfinals
2004–05	Amherst	13–10–2	11–6–2	5th	NESCAC Quarterfinals
2005–06	Amherst	12–12–1	9–9–1	6th	NESCAC Quarterfinals
2006–07	Amherst	14–10–1	10–8–1	5th	NESCAC Semifinals
2007–08	Amherst	14–9–3	11–6–2	4th	NESCAC Semifinals
2008–09	Amherst	22–5–1	16–2–1	1st	NCAA Quarterfinals
2009–10	Amherst	16–5–4	11–4–4	4th	NESCAC Quarterfinals
2010–11	Amherst	12–9–4	10–6–3	T–3rd	NESCAC Quarterfinals
2011–12	Amherst	24–4–1	17–1–0	1st	NCAA Frozen Four
2012–13	Amherst	15–7–3	11–5–2	T–4th	NESCAC Quarterfinals
2013–14	Amherst	16–8–3	12–4–2	2nd	NESCAC Runner-Up
2014–15	Amherst	22–5–2	14–4–0	2nd	NCAA Frozen Four
Amherst:		237–133–44	174–88–33		
Amherst (NESCAC) (2015–2017)
2015–16	Amherst	11–12–4	7–8–3	6th	NESCAC Runner-Up
2016–17	Amherst	14–7–3	9–6–2	5th	NESCAC Quarterfinals
Amherst:		25–19–7	16–14–5		
Amherst Mammoths (NESCAC) (2017–present)
2017–18	Amherst	11–9–5	8–5–5	T–3rd	NESCAC Quarterfinals
2018–19	Amherst	15–7–4	10–4–4	3rd	NESCAC Runner-Up
2019–20	Amherst	9–12–4	7–8–3	T–5th	NESCAC Quarterfinals
Amherst:		35–28–13	25–17–12		
Total:		489–359–78			
National champion Postseason invitational champion Conference regular season champion Conference regular season and conference tournament champion Division regular season champion Division regular season and conference tournament champion Conference tournament champion

== See also ==
- List of college men's ice hockey coaches with 400 wins

Awards and achievements
Preceded by Tim Coghlin; Chris Schultz	Edward Jeremiah Award; 2011–12; 2014–15	Succeeded by Matt Loen; Chris Schultz/Peter Belisle
