= Matt Loen =

American ice hockey coach (born 1972)

Current position
- Title: Head coach
- Team: Wisconsin–Eau Claire
- Conference: WIAC

Biographical details
- Born: November 9, 1972 (age 53); Coon Rapids, Minnesota, U.S.
- Education: University of Wisconsin–Eau Claire

Playing career
- 1991–1995: Wisconsin–Eau Claire
- 1995–1999: Madison Monsters
- 1997–1998: Milwaukee Admirals
- 1998–1999: Cincinnati Mighty Ducks
- 1999–2000: Madison Kodiaks
- 1999–2001: Milwaukee Admirals
- 2000–2001: Kalamazoo Wings
- 2001–2002: Tacoma Sabercats
- 2002–2003: Rockford IceHogs
- Position: Center

Coaching career (HC unless noted)
- 2005–2007: Wisconsin–Eau Claire (asst.)
- 2007–Present: Wisconsin–Eau Claire

Head coaching record
- Overall: 235–135–30 (.625)
- Tournaments: 4–0 (1.000)

Accomplishments and honors

Championships
- 2013 NCHA champion 2013 NCHA tournament champion 2013 NCAA National Champion; 2014 WIAC tournament champion 2016 WIAC co-champion 2018 WIAC tournament champion 2020 WIAC champion 2020 WIAC tournament champion 2022 WIAC tournament champion

Awards
- 2013 Edward Jeremiah Award

Matt Loen (born November 9, 1972) is an American ice hockey coach and former player who was the NCAA Division III coach of the year.

== Career ==
Loen attended the University of Wisconsin–Eau Claire from 1991 and joined the ice hockey program. After his freshman campaign, he became one of the top scorers for the Blugolds and helped to lead the team in scoring as a senior. He earned a professional contract after graduating and continued his career in the minor leagues. In 1997, a 100-point season helped promote him to the top level of the minor leagues. Loen stayed at the AAA level for half a season around 2000. Afterwards, he returned to the lower level and finished playing in 2003.

A few years later, Loen returned to his alma mater as an assistant coach. He spent two years in the position before replacing Luke Strand as head coach. In his sixth season, Wisconsin–Eau Claire won 20 games for the first time in program history and reached the NCAA Tournament for just the second time in 36 years. The Blugolds stunned tournament favorite St. Norbert in the quarter final round and then won the National Championship. Loen was named as the national coach of the year for this turnaround.

The following year, Wisconsin–Eau Claire was a founding member of the WIAC's ice hockey division. The Blugolds continued to perform well under Loen and recorded at least 15 wins in each of the next seven seasons. Despite a pair of conference titles, UWEC was unable to return to the national tournament until 2020. The championship was cancelled before a game could be played due to the COVID-19 pandemic. Loen continued to coach the team and the Blugolds won a league title in 2022.

== Statistics ==
=== Regular season and playoffs ===
			Regular Season					Playoffs
Season	Team	League	GP	G	A	Pts	PIM	GP	G	A	Pts	PIM
1991–92	Wisconsin–Eau Claire	NCHA	17	0	1	1	0	—	—	—	—	—
1992–93	Wisconsin–Eau Claire	NCHA	26	9	14	23	12	—	—	—	—	—
1993–94	Wisconsin–Eau Claire	NCHA	27	15	25	40	36	—	—	—	—	—
1994–95	Wisconsin–Eau Claire	NCHA	27	19	37	56	10	—	—	—	—	—
1995–96	Madison Monsters	CoHL	68	36	39	75	26	6	4	3	7	2
1996–97	Madison Monsters	CoHL	73	47	59	106	16	5	2	3	5	2
1997–98	Madison Monsters	UHL	50	34	53	87	20	5	5	2	7	4
1997–98	Milwaukee Admirals	IHL	9	0	3	3	0	2	0	0	0	0
1998–99	Madison Monsters	UHL	47	26	35	61	30	—	—	—	—	—
1998–99	Cincinnati Mighty Ducks	AHL	21	0	1	1	0	—	—	—	—	—
1999–00	Madison Kodiaks	UHL	35	19	27	46	30	—	—	—	—	—
1999–00	Milwaukee Admirals	IHL	45	7	9	16	4	3	1	2	3	2
2000–01	Kalamazoo Wings	UHL	72	21	36	57	68	1	1	0	1	2
2000–01	Milwaukee Admirals	IHL	1	0	1	1	0	—	—	—	—	—
2001–02	Tacoma Sabercats	WCHL	52	17	34	51	30	5	0	2	2	4
2002–03	Rockford IceHogs	UHL	76	22	52	74	48	3	0	1	1	6
NCAA totals			97	43	77	120	58	—	—	—	—	—
UHL/CoHL totals			421	205	301	506	238	20	12	9	21	16
IHL totals			55	7	13	20	4	5	1	2	3	2

== Head coaching record ==
Record table
Season	Team	Overall	Conference	Standing	Postseason
Wisconsin–Eau Claire Blugolds (NCHA) (2007–2013)
2007–08	Wisconsin–Eau Claire	11–16–1	6–7–1	T–5th	NCHA Semifinals
2008–09	Wisconsin–Eau Claire	13–13–1	3–10–1	7th	NCHA Quarterfinals
2009–10	Wisconsin–Eau Claire	8–15–4	4–10–4	6th	NCHA Quarterfinals
2010–11	Wisconsin–Eau Claire	15–11–1	8–9–1	T–4th	NCHA Quarterfinals
2011–12	Wisconsin–Eau Claire	13–12–3	5–11–2	6th	NCHA Semifinals
2012–13	Wisconsin–Eau Claire	24–5–2	14–3–1	1st	NCAA National Champion
Wisconsin–Eau Claire:		84–72–12	40–50–10		
Wisconsin–Eau Claire (WIAC) (2013–present)
2013–14	Wisconsin–Eau Claire	19–8–1	6–5–1	3rd	WIAC Champion
2014–15	Wisconsin–Eau Claire	18–7–1	9–3–0	2nd	WIAC Semifinals
2015–16	Wisconsin–Eau Claire	15–6–6	5–2–1	T–1st	WIAC Semifinals
2016–17	Wisconsin–Eau Claire	18–7–3	5–3–0	2nd	WIAC Runner-up
2017–18	Wisconsin–Eau Claire	17–10–1	5–2–1	2nd	WIAC Champion
2018–19	Wisconsin–Eau Claire	19–7–2	4–3–1	2nd	WIAC Runner-up
2019–20	Wisconsin–Eau Claire	22–4–2	11–3–1	T–1st	NCAA tournament cancelled
2020–21	Wisconsin–Eau Claire	5–3–1	5–2–1	2nd	WIAC Semifinals
2021–22	Wisconsin–Eau Claire	18–11–1	9–6–0	3rd	WIAC Champion
Wisconsin–Eau Claire:		151–63–18	59–29–6		
Total:		235–135–30			
National champion Postseason invitational champion Conference regular season champion Conference regular season and conference tournament champion Division regular season champion Division regular season and conference tournament champion Conference tournament champion

Awards and achievements
Preceded by Jack Arena	Edward Jeremiah Award; 2012–13	Succeeded by Chris Schultz
