= Edward Jeremiah Award =

- Sport: Ice hockey
- Awarded for: The most outstanding coach in NCAA Division III men's ice hockey.

History
- First award: 1970
- Most recent: Peter Roundy

The Edward Jeremiah Award is awarded yearly to the top coach in Division III men's ice hockey by the American Hockey Coaches Association.

The finalists for each year's award comprise the conference Coach of the Year winners from each Division III men's ice hockey conference, plus the coaches of the Frozen Four teams.

The award was originally given to the top college division coach but when the NCAA changed to numerical divisions in 1973 the honor became available to any coach at the Division II or Division III level. The Division II ice hockey level has only occurred sporadically and thus the Edward Jeremiah Award is only officially awarded to the much more stable D-III level of competition.

Eddie Jeremiah was the long-time coach for Dartmouth College who, in addition to winning 308 college games, wrote an instructional text considered the hockey bible by many.

== Award winners ==
Year	Coach	Team
1970	Sid Watson	Bowdoin
1971	Sid Watson	Bowdoin
1972	Jack Canniff	Massachusetts
1973	Jim Cross	Vermont
1974	Barry Urbanski	Salem State
1975	Wendall Forbes	Middlebury
1976	Don Roberts	Gustavus Adolphus
1977	Bill Riley Jr.	Lowell
1978	Sid Watson	Bowdoin
1979	Don Brose	Mankato State
1980	Steve Stirling	Babson
1981	Herb Hammond	Plattsburgh State
1982	Steve Stirling	Babson
1983	Mike Gibbons	Bemidji State
1983	Peter Van Buskirk	Holy Cross
1984	Bob Peters	Bemidji State
1985	Rob Riley	Babson
1986	Terry Meagher	Bowdoin
1987	Tony Mariano	Norwich
1988	Glenn Thomaris	Elmira
1989	Terry Meagher	Bowdoin
1990	Bill Beaney	Middlebury
1991	Glenn Thomaris	Elmira
1992	Bruce Marshall	Connecticut
1993	Joe Baldarotta	Wisconsin–Stevens Point
1994	Jeff Meredith	Fredonia State
1995	Bill Beaney	Middlebury
1996	Dean Talafous	Wisconsin–River Falls
1997	Mike McShane	Norwich

Year	Coach	Team
1998	Mike Schwartz	Augsburg
1999	Mike McShane	Norwich
2000	Mike McShane	Norwich
2001	Wayne Wilson	RIT
2002	Dan Stauber	Wisconsin–Superior
2003	George Roll	Oswego State
2004	Bill Beaney	Middlebury
2005	Terry Skrypek	St. Thomas
2006	Bill Beaney	Middlebury
2007	Ed Gosek	Oswego State
2008	Tim Coghlin	St. Norbert
2009	Dominick Dawes	Neumann
2010	Mike McShane	Norwich
2011	Tim Coghlin	St. Norbert
2012	Jack Arena	Amherst
2013	Matt Loen	Wisconsin–Eau Claire
2014	Chris Schultz	Geneseo State
2015	Jack Arena	Amherst
2016	Chris Schultz	Geneseo State
2016	Peter Belisle	Massachusetts–Boston
2017	Mike McShane	Norwich
2018	Blaise MacDonald	Colby
2019	Tyler Krueger	Wisconsin–Stevens Point
2020	Cam Ellsworth	Norwich
2022	Adam Krug	Adrian
2023	Mark Taylor	Hobart
2024	Mark Taylor	Hobart
2025	Peter Roundy	Curry
2026	Mark Taylor	Hobart

=== Winners by school ===
School	Winners
Norwich	7
Bowdoin	5
Middlebury	5
Babson	3
Hobart	3
Amherst	2
Bemidji State	2
Elmira	2
Geneseo State	2
Oswego State	2
St. Norbert	2
Wisconsin–Stevens Point	2
Adrian	1
Augsburg	1
Colby	1
Connecticut	1
Curry	1
Fredonia State	1
Gustavus Adolphus	1
Holy Cross	1
Lowell	1
Massachusetts	1
Massachusetts–Boston	1
Mankato State	1
Neumann	1
Plattsburgh State	1
RIT	1
Salem State	1
St. Thomas	1
Vermont	1
Wisconsin–Eau Claire	1
Wisconsin–River Falls	1
Wisconsin–Superior	1

=== Multiple Wins ===
Coach	Awards
Mike McShane	5
Bill Beaney	4
Sid Watson	3
Mark Taylor	3
Jack Arena	2
Tim Coghlin	2
Terry Meagher	2
Chris Schultz	2
Steve Stirling	2
Glenn Thomaris	2

== See also ==
Spencer Penrose Award
