= ECAC West men's tournament =

ECAC West men's tournament (defunct)
- Conference hockey championship
- Sport: Ice hockey
- Conference: ECAC West
- Format: Single-elimination
- Played: 1985–2017
- Current champion: Hobart
- Most championships: Elmira (9)

The ECAC West men's tournament was a Division III conference tournament held from establishment of the ECAC West as an independent league until the dissolution of the conference in 2017.

== History ==
The ECAC West men's tournament began in 1985, a year after the ECAC West split from ECAC 2 and followed the same format it had during the time in its predecessor. In the first 8 years the champion received an automatic bid to the NCAA Tournament. In 1992 an effort was made by some universities to restart the Division II Championship. Because Mercyhurst was one such team all SUNYAC members were forced to leave the conference and membership dropped to 7 schools. This necessitated a change to the conference tournament which was decreased from 8 to 4 participants. During the 90's the league would routinely send members to both the D-II and D-III national tournaments but all efforts at continuing the second-tier tournament ended after 1998.

The 4-member tournament continued unabated until 2007 when a single quarterfinal game was instituted. This arrangement held for six years before a second quarterfinal match was instituted and the 6-team tournament continued until the entire tournament was discontinued in 2017 due to the conference's dissolution.

== 1985 ==
Seed	School	Conference record	Seed	School	Conference record
1	RIT	20–2–0	5	Geneseo State	19–9–1
2	Plattsburgh State	19–4–0	6	Elmira	16–7–0
3	Union	14–4–1	7	Potsdam State	12–12–0
4	Oswego State	20–8–0	8	-	-

Quarterfinals; March 3
1	RIT	-
-	Bye	-
2	Plattsburgh State	5
7	Potsdam State	2
3	Union	3
6	Elmira	2
4	Oswego State	5
5	Geneseo State	4

Semifinals; March 6
1	RIT	10
4	Oswego State	1
2	Plattsburgh State	1
3	Union	2*

Championship; March 9
1	RIT	3
3	Union	7

Note: * denotes overtime period(s)

== 1986 ==
Seed	School	Conference record	Seed	School	Conference record
1	RIT	22–3–0	5	Oswego State	18–9–1
2	Elmira	21–4–0	6	Geneseo State	15–12–1
3	Plattsburgh State	16–5–1	7	Canisius	12–8–1
4	Union	13–7–0	8	-	-

Note: Canisius was invited to play in the tournament despite not being an ECAC West member

Quarterfinals; March 2
1	RIT	-
-	Bye	-
2	Elmira	6
7	Canisius	3
3	Plattsburgh State	6
6	Geneseo State	3
4	Union	4
5	Oswego State	3

Semifinals; March 5
1	RIT	8
4	Union	6
2	Elmira	2
3	Plattsburgh State	3

Championship; March 8
1	RIT	9
3	Plattsburgh State	5

Note: * denotes overtime period(s)

== 1987 ==
Seed	School	Conference record	Seed	School	Conference record
1	Plattsburgh State	23–1–0	5	Canisius	13–9–0
2	Hamilton	15–5–0	6	Elmira	14–8–0
3	Oswego State	20–9–0	7	Geneseo State	16–13–0
4	RIT	13–6–0	8	-	-

Note: Canisius was invited to play in the tournament despite not being an ECAC West member

Quarterfinals; March 1
1	Plattsburgh State	-
-	Bye	-
2	Hamilton	14
7	Geneseo State	1
3	Oswego State	4
6	Elmira	3
4	RIT	0
5	Canisius	2

Semifinals; March 4
1	Plattsburgh State	9
5	Canisius	4
2	Hamilton	4
3	Oswego State	5

Championship; March 7
1	Plattsburgh State	5
3	Oswego State	2

Note: * denotes overtime period(s)

== 1988 ==
Seed	School	Conference record	Seed	School	Conference record
1	Elmira	20–2–0	5	RIT	13–7–1
2	Plattsburgh State	19–6–0	6	Hamilton	12–9–0
3	Oswego State	18–7–0	7	Canisius	10–7–0
4	Union	12–7–2	8	-	-

Quarterfinals; February 27
1	Elmira	-
-	Bye	-
2	Plattsburgh State	6
7	Canisius	3
3	Oswego State	3
6	Hamilton	2
4	Union	4
5	RIT	5*

Semifinals; March 2
1	Elmira	8
5	RIT	4
2	Plattsburgh State	5
3	Oswego State	7

Championship; March 5
1	Elmira	8
3	Oswego State	5

Note: * denotes overtime period(s)

== 1989 ==
Seed	School	Conference record	Seed	School	Conference record
1	RIT	19–2–1	5	Elmira	14–7–0
2	Hamilton	17–6–0	6	Canisius	13–9–0
3	Union	16–6–1	7	Geneseo State	14–13–1
4	Oswego State	17–8–1	8	Cortland State	11–11–0

Quarterfinals; February 25
1	RIT	9
8	Courtland State	3
2	Hamilton	7
7	Geneseo State	1
3	Union	6
6	Canisius	3
4	Oswego State	3
5	Elmira	8

Semifinals; March 1
1	RIT	9
5	Elmira	5
2	Hamilton	2
3	Union	3*

Championship; March 4
1	RIT	5
3	Union	3

Note: * denotes overtime period(s)

== 1990 ==
Seed	School	Conference record	Seed	School	Conference record
1	RIT	16–2–2	5	Plattsburgh State	17–8–1
2	Elmira	19–3–1	6	Union	14–5–3
3	Mercyhurst	16–3–2	7	Hamilton	13–9–1
4	Geneseo State	19–7–0	8	Oswego State	13–12–1

Quarterfinals; February 27
1	RIT	5
8	Oswego State	7
2	Elmira	6
7	Hamilton	5
3	Mercyhurst	5
6	Union	4
4	Geneseo State	3
5	Plattsburgh State	1

Semifinals; March 2
2	Elmira	7
8	Oswego State	0
3	Mercyhurst	2
4	Geneseo State	3

Championship; March 5
2	Elmira	9
4	Geneseo State	7

Note: * denotes overtime period(s)

== 1991 ==
Seed	School	Conference record	Seed	School	Conference record
1	Elmira	23–3–0	5	Fredonia State	14–9–1
2	Mercyhurst	15–3–0	6	Union	16–4–3
3	RIT	14–5–2	7	Cortland State	10–12–1
4	Geneseo State	21–3–3	8	Oswego State	12–12–1

Quarterfinals; February 26
1	Elmira	7*
8	Oswego	6
2	Mercyhurst	5
7	Cortland State	2
3	RIT	6
6	Union	3
4	Geneseo State	6
5	Fredonia State	5

Semifinals; March 1
1	Elmira	8
4	Geneseo State	2
2	Mercyhurst	4
3	RIT	1

Championship; March 4
1	Elmira	6
2	Mercyhurst	3

Note: * denotes overtime period(s)

== 1992 ==
Seed	School	Conference record	Seed	School	Conference record
1	Plattsburgh State	24–1–2	5	Geneseo State	15–10–1
2	Elmira	18–4–0	6	Oswego State	15–8–2
3	Mercyhurst	13–8–0	7	RIT	11–11–2
4	Fredonia State	14–9–1	8	Hobart	12–12–0

Quarterfinals; March 3
1	Plattsburgh State	6
8	Hobart	2
2	Elmira	7
7	RIT	2
3	Mercyhurst	8
6	Oswego State	2
4	Fredonia State	4
5	Geneseo State	2

Semifinals; March 6
1	Plattsburgh State	7
4	Fredonia State	5
2	Elmira	0
3	Mercyhurst	3

Championship; March 7
1	Plattsburgh State	6
3	Mercyhurst	3

Note: * denotes overtime period(s)

== 1993 ==
Seed	School	Conference record
1	Elmira	19–5–0
2	Mercyhurst	15–3–0
3	Canisius	17–6–1
4	Hobart	14–8–0

Semifinals; March 5
1	Elmira	9
4	Hobart	3
2	Mercyhurst	3
3	Canisius	5

Championship; March 6
1	Elmira	2
3	Canisius	1

Note: * denotes overtime period(s)

== 1994 ==
Seed	School	Conference record
1	Elmira	9–1–0
2	Canisius	7–3–0
3	RIT	6–4–0
4	Mercyhurst	6–4–0

Semifinals; March 4
1	Elmira	3
4	Mercyhurst	5
2	Canisius	3
3	RIT	4

Championship; March 5
1	Elmira	2
3	RIT	5

Note: * denotes overtime period(s)

== 1995 ==
Seed	School	Conference record
1	Mercyhurst	6–1–1
2	RIT	5–2–1
3	Canisius	4–2–2
4	Elmira	2–4–2

Semifinals; March 3
1	Mercyhurst	5
4	Elmira	4
2	RIT	5**
3	Canisius	4

Championship; March 5
1	Mercyhurst	9
2	RIT	2

Note: * denotes overtime period(s)

== 1996 ==
Seed	School	Conference record
1	RIT	5–2–1
2	Canisius	5–2–1
3	Mercyhurst	5–3–0
4	Elmira	4–4–0

Semifinals; March 1
1	RIT	10
4	Elmira	6
2	Canisius	2
3	Mercyhurst	6

Championship; March 2
1	RIT	3*
3	Mercyhurst	2

Note: * denotes overtime period(s)

== 1997 ==
Seed	School	Conference record
1	RIT	8–1–1
2	Elmira	5–3–2
3	Mercyhurst	5–4–1
4	Canisius	1–8–2

Note: Niagara possessed the second best record in the conference but was ineligible for tournament play

Semifinals; March 7
1	RIT	3*
4	Canisius	2
2	Elmira	8
3	Mercyhurst	5

Championship; March 8
1	RIT	4
2	Elmira	5**

Note: * denotes overtime period(s)

== 1998 ==
Seed	School	Conference record
1	Niagara	8–1–1
2	RIT	7–1–2
3	Mercyhurst	4–5–1
4	Canisius	4–5–1

Semifinals; March 6
1	Niagara	4
4	Canisius	1
2	RIT	3
3	Mercyhurst	0

Championship; March 7
1	Niagara	5
2	RIT	2

Note: * denotes overtime period(s)

== 1999 ==
Seed	School	Conference record
1	RIT	4–0–2
2	Elmira	4–1–1
3	Mercyhurst	2–3–1
4	Hobart	0–6–0

Semifinals; March 5
1	RIT	10
4	Hobart	3
2	Elmira	4
3	Mercyhurst	7

Championship; March 6
1	RIT	6
3	Mercyhurst	1

Note: * denotes overtime period(s)

== 2000 ==
Seed	School	Conference record
1	RIT	5–1–0
2	Elmira	5–1–0
3	Manhattanville	1–5–0
4	Hobart	1–5–0

Semifinals; March 3
1	RIT	6
4	Hobart	4
2	Elmira	7
3	Manhattanville	0

Championship; March 4
1	RIT	3
2	Elmira	1

Note: * denotes overtime period(s)

== 2001 ==
Seed	School	Conference record
1	RIT	6–0–0
2	Elmira	3–3–0
3	Manhattanville	2–3–1
4	Hobart	0–5–1

Semifinals; March 2
1	RIT	9
4	Hobart	1
2	Elmira	5
3	Manhattanville	6

Championship; March 3
1	RIT	8
3	Manhattanville	2

Note: * denotes overtime period(s)

== 2002 ==
Seed	School	Conference record
1	RIT	9–1–0
2	Elmira	8–2–0
3	Manhattanville	5–4–1
4	Hobart	5–5–0

Semifinals; March 1
1	RIT	10
4	Hobart	1
2	Elmira	4
3	Manhattanville	3

Championship; March 2
1	RIT	2
2	Elmira	1

Note: * denotes overtime period(s)

== 2003 ==
Seed	School	Conference record
1	RIT	8–1–1
2	Manhattanville	7–3–0
3	Elmira	6–3–1
4	Hobart	4–5–1

Semifinals; March 7
1	RIT	6
4	Hobart	2
2	Manhattanville	3
3	Elmira	5

Championship; March 8
1	RIT	3
3	Elmira	4

Note: * denotes overtime period(s)

== 2004 ==
Seed	School	Conference record
1	Hobart	7–2–1
2	Manhattanville	6–2–2
3	RIT	6–2–2
4	Utica	4–5–1

Semifinals; March 5
1	Hobart	4
4	Utica	2
2	Manhattanville	2
3	RIT	4

Championship; March 6
1	Hobart	3
3	RIT	1

Note: * denotes overtime period(s)

== 2005 ==
Seed	School	Conference record
1	Utica	9–1–2
2	Manhattanville	8–3–1
3	RIT	7–4–1
4	Elmira	6–5–1

Semifinals; March 4
1	Utica	4**
4	Elmira	3
2	Manhattanville	6
3	RIT	2

Championship; March 6
1	Utica	1
2	Manhattanville	3

Note: * denotes overtime period(s)

== 2006 ==
Seed	School	Conference record
1	Manhattanville	11–2–2
2	Hobart	10–5–0
3	Elmira	8–6–1
4	Utica	7–6–2

Semifinals; March 3
1	Manhattanville	3
4	Utica	5
2	Hobart	3
3	Elmira	4

Championship; March 4
4	Utica	2
3	Elmira	3

Note: * denotes overtime period(s)

== 2007 ==
Seed	School	Conference record	Seed	School	Conference record
1	Manhattanville	9–1–5	4	Elmira	7–6–2
2	Neumann	8–3–4	5	Hobart	5–7–3
3	Utica	7–5–3		-	-

Quarterfinal; February 21
4	Elmira	5*
5	Hobart	4

Semifinals; February 24
1	Manhattanville	5
4	Elmira	3
2	Neumann	2
3	Utica	1

Championship; March 3
1	Manhattanville	5*
2	Neumann	4

Note: * denotes overtime period(s)

== 2008 ==
Seed	School	Conference record	Seed	School	Conference record
1	Elmira	10–2–3	4	Hobart	7–6–2
2	Manhattanville	8–5–2	5	Neumann	8–7–0
3	Utica	8–6–1		-	-

Quarterfinal; February 27
4	Hobart	3
5	Neumann	2

Semifinals; March 1
1	Elmira	6
4	Hobart	3
2	Manhattanville	6
3	Utica	2

Championship; March 8
1	Elmira	0
2	Manhattanville	1

Note: * denotes overtime period(s)

== 2009 ==
Seed	School	Conference record	Seed	School	Conference record
1	Elmira	9–3–3	4	Neumann	8–5–2
2	Manhattanville	8–3–4	5	Utica	5–9–1
3	Hobart	9–4–2		-	-

Quarterfinal; February 25
4	Neumann	4
5	Utica	3

Semifinals; February 28
1	Elmira	1
4	Neumann	2
2	Manhattanville	1
3	Hobart	3

Championship; March 7
4	Neumann	2
3	Hobart	1

Note: * denotes overtime period(s)

== 2010 ==
Seed	School	Conference record	Seed	School	Conference record
1	Elmira	11–4–0	4	Neumann	7–5–3
2	Manhattanville	10–4–1	5	Utica	4–9–2
3	Hobart	9–4–2		-	-

Quarterfinal; February 24
4	Neumann	3
5	Utica	1

Semifinals; February 28
1	Elmira	4
4	Neumann	2
2	Manhattanville	4
3	Hobart	2

Championship; March 7
1	Elmira	3
2	Manhattanville	4

Note: * denotes overtime period(s)

== 2011 ==
Seed	School	Conference record	Seed	School	Conference record
1	Elmira	8–3–1	4	Hobart	4–7–1
2	Neumann	7–4–1	5	Manhattanville	3–9–0
3	Utica	6–5–1		-	-

Quarterfinal; February 23
4	Hobart	3
5	Manhattanville	1

Semifinals; February 26
1	Elmira	5
4	Hobart	2
2	Neumann	5
3	Utica	2

Championship; March 5
1	Elmira	5
2	Neumann	1

Note: * denotes overtime period(s)

== 2012 ==
Seed	School	Conference record	Seed	School	Conference record
1	Elmira	8–2–2	4	Utica	4–6–2
2	Manhattanville	6–6–0	5	Neumann	3–6–3
3	Hobart	5–6–1		-	-

Quarterfinal; February 22
4	Utica	3
5	Neumann	4*

Semifinals; February 25
1	Elmira	4
5	Neumann	5*
2	Manhattanville	2
3	Hobart	6

Championship; March 3
5	Neumann	0
3	Hobart	5

Note: * denotes overtime period(s)

== 2013 ==
Seed	School	Conference record	Seed	School	Conference record
1	Utica	11–3–1	4	Manhattanville	6–6–3
2	Hobart	11–3–1	5	Elmira	5–10–0
3	Neumann	8–6–1	6	Nazareth	1–14–0

Quarterfinals; February 20
3	Neumann	4
6	Nazareth	1
4	Manhattanville	9
5	Elmira	1

Semifinals; February 23
1	Utica	1
4	Manhattanville	2*
2	Hobart	0
3	Neumann	2

Championship; March 2
4	Manhattanville	0
3	Neumann	3

Note: * denotes overtime period(s)

== 2014 ==
Seed	School	Conference record	Seed	School	Conference record
1	Utica	10–4–1	4	Manhattanville	5–8–2
2	Elmira	9–5–1	5	Neumann	4–8–3
3	Hobart	7–5–3	6	Nazareth	4–9–2

Quarterfinals; February 26
3	Hobart	2
6	Nazareth	1
4	Manhattanville	5
5	Neumann	2

Semifinals; March 1
1	Utica	1
4	Manhattanville	0
2	Elmira	5
3	Hobart	3

Championship; March 8
1	Utica	2
2	Elmira	5

Note: * denotes overtime period(s)

== 2015 ==
Seed	School	Conference record	Seed	School	Conference record
1	Hobart	12–3–0	4	Elmira	5–8–2
2	Neumann	9–5–1	5	Utica	4–8–3
3	Nazareth	7–4–4	6	Manhattanville	2–11–2

Quarterfinals; February 25
3	Nazareth	5
6	Manhattanville	1
4	Elmira	5
5	Utica	2

Semifinals; February 28
1	Hobart	5
4	Elmira	1
2	Neumann	8
3	Nazareth	4

Championship; March 7
1	Hobart	2*
2	Neumann	1

Note: * denotes overtime period(s)

== 2016 ==
Seed	School	Conference record	Seed	School	Conference record
1	Hobart	12–3–0	4	Neumann	6–7–2
2	Manhattanville	8–7–0	5	Nazareth	5–9–1
3	Utica	6–6–3	6	Elmira	4–9–2

Quarterfinals; February 24
3	Utica	5
6	Elmira	3
4	Neumann	2
5	Nazareth	1

Semifinals; February 27
1	Hobart	3
4	Neumann	0
2	Manhattanville	3
3	Utica	4*

Championship; March 5
1	Hobart	5
3	Utica	0

Note: * denotes overtime period(s)

== 2017 ==
Seed	School	Conference record	Seed	School	Conference record
1	Utica	12–2–0	4	Nazareth	8–6–0
2	Manhattanville	10–4–0	5	Neumann	7–6–1
3	Hobart	9–4–1	6	Stevenson	4–9–1

Quarterfinals; February 22
3	Hobart	6
6	Stevenson	2
4	Nazareth	1
5	Neumann	4

Semifinals; February 25
1	Utica	4
5	Neumann	3
2	Manhattanville	2
3	Hobart	6

Championship; March 5
1	Utica	1
3	Hobart	2*

Note: * denotes overtime period(s)

== Championships ==
School	Years	Championships
Elmira	33	9
RIT	21	8
Hobart	33	5
Manhattanville	18	4
Plattsburgh State	8	2
Neumann	16	1
Mercyhurst	11	1
Union	7	1
Niagara	2	1
Utica	16	0
Canisius	11	0
Brockport State	8	0
Cortland State	8	0
Geneseo State	8	0
Hamilton	8	0
Oswego State	8	0
Potsdam State	8	0
Lebanon Valley	7	0
St. Bonaventure	7	0
Binghamton	5	0
Fredonia State	5	0
Nazareth	5	0
Buffalo	3	0
Scranton	3	0
Stevenson	1	0

== See also ==
ECAC 2 Tournament
