= Sid Watson Award =

- Sport: Ice hockey
- Awarded for: The most outstanding player in NCAA Division III men's ice hockey.

History
- First award: 1993
- Most recent: Damon Beaver (Hobart)

The Sid Watson Award is an annual award given to the top player in NCAA Division III Men's Ice Hockey. It is given by the American Hockey Coaches Association. It was known as the Division III Men's Player of the Year Award prior to 2005.

In 2004, the AHCA voted to rename the Division III Men's Player of the Year after Sid Watson. The award is named for longtime Bowdoin College hockey coach and athletic director Sid Watson, who died in April 2004 at age 71. Watson was a three sports star at Northeastern and went on to play four seasons in the NFL before starting his coaching career at Bowdoin in 1958.

Due to the COVID-19 pandemic, the award was not conferred during the 2021 season.

== Award winners ==
Year	Winner	Position	School
1993	Frank Cirone	Forward	Wisconsin–Stevens Point
1994	Ray Alcindor	Forward	Middlebury
1995	Charlie Gaffney	Forward	Bowdoin
1996	Ian Smith	Defense	Middlebury
1997	Steve Toll	Forward	RIT
1998	Mark Spence	Forward	Middlebury
1999	Rob Smillie	Forward	St. Norbert
2000	Steve Aronson	Forward	St. Thomas
2001	Keith Aucoin	Forward	Norwich
2002	Jerry Galway	Defense	RIT
2003	Māris Ziediņš	Forward	St. Norbert
2004	Kevin Cooper	Forward	Middlebury
2005	Kurtis McLean	Forward	Norwich
2006	Adam Hanna	Goaltender	St. John's
2007	Andrew Gallant	Goaltender	Manhattanville
2008	Kyle Jones	Goaltender	St. Norbert
2009	Jeff Landers	Defense	Amherst

Year	Winner	Position	School
2010	David Martinson	Forward	Gustavus Adolphus
2011	Chris Berenguer	Defense	Hamline
2012	Jonathan LaRose	Goaltender	Amherst
2013	Paul Rodrigues	Forward	Oswego State
2014	David Jacobson	Goaltender	St. Norbert
2015	Drew Fielding	Goaltender	St. Thomas
2016	Jamie Murray	Goaltender	Babson
2017	Evan Buitenhuis	Goaltender	Hamilton
2018	Colin Larkin	Forward	Massachusetts–Boston
2019	Devin McDonald	Goaltender	Geneseo State
2020	Tom Aubrun	Goaltender	Norwich
2022	Peter Bates	Forward	St. Norbert
2023	Matus Spodniak	Forward	Adrian
2024	Devon Bobak	Goaltender	Trinity
2025	Shane Soderwall	Goaltender	Curry
2026	Damon Beaver	Goaltender	Hobart

=== Winners by school ===
School	Winners
St. Norbert	5
Middlebury	4
Norwich	3
Amherst	2
RIT	2
St. Thomas	2
Adrian	1
Babson	1
Bowdoin	1
Curry	1
Geneseo State	1
Gustavus Adolphus	1
Hamilton	1
Hamline	1
Hobart	1
Manhattanville	1
Massachusetts–Boston	1
Oswego State	1
St. John's	1
Trinity	1
Wisconsin–Stevens Point	1

=== Winners by position ===
Position	Winners
Forward	15
Defense	4
Goaltender	13

== See also ==
- Hobey Baker Award – D-I men's equivalent
- Laura Hurd Award – D-III women's equivalent
- Patty Kazmaier Award – D-I women's equivalent
