= 2015–16 NCAA Division III men's ice hockey season =

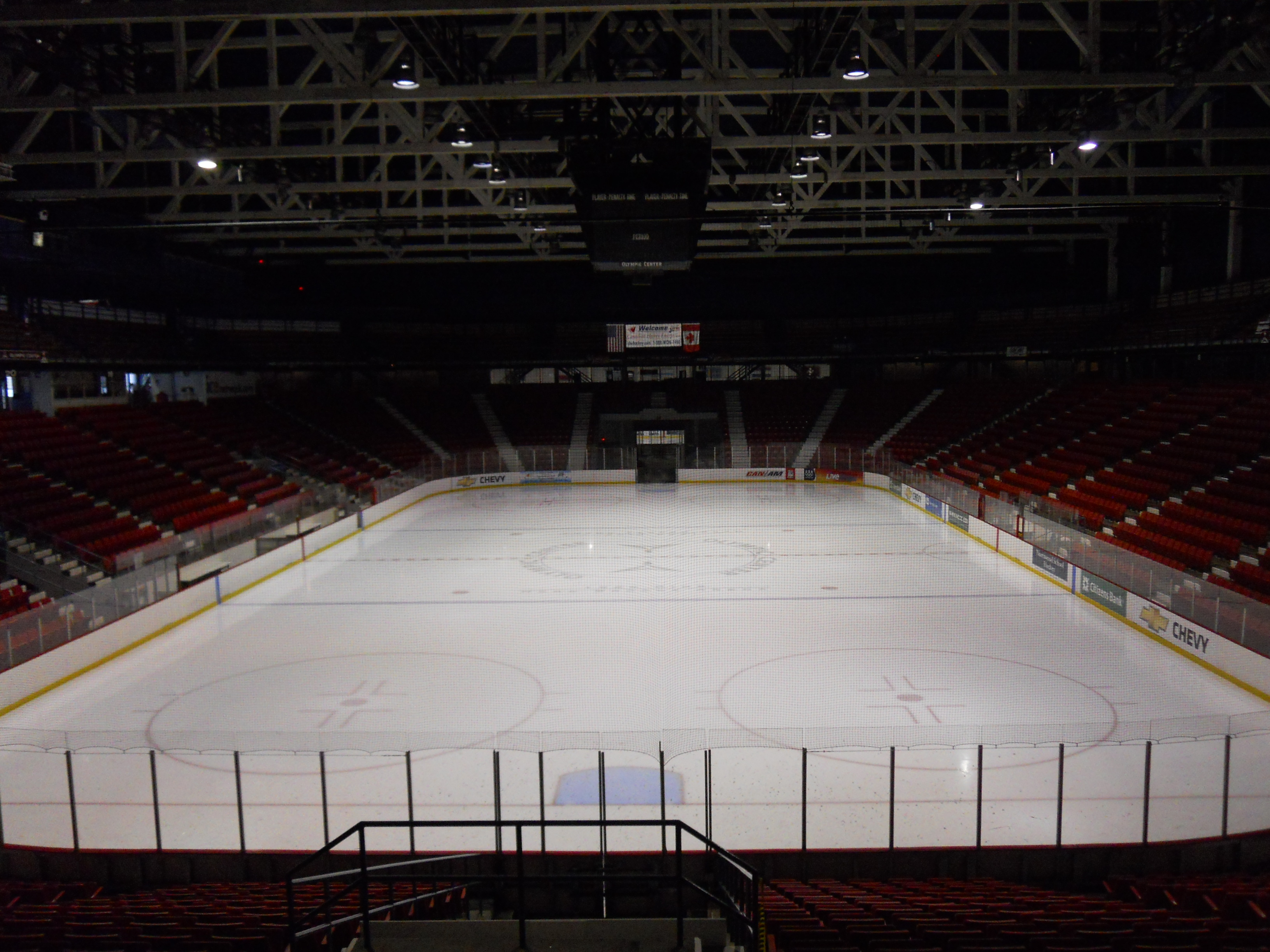
- The Herb Brooks Arena was the host of the 2016 Frozen Four
- Duration: October 30, 2015– March 26, 2016
- NCAA tournament: 2016
- National championship: Herb Brooks Arena; Lake Placid, New York
- NCAA champion: Wisconsin–Stevens Point
- Sid Watson Award: Jamie Murray (Babson)

The 2015–16 NCAA Division III men's ice hockey season began on October 30, 2015, and concluded on March 26, 2016. This was the 43rd season of Division III college ice hockey.

ECAC East rebranded itself as the New England Hockey Conference (NEHC) and retained the same league membership from the previous year.

== Regular season ==
=== Standings ===
2015–16 ECAC Northeast standings
| | Conference | | | | | | | Overall | | | | | |
| | GP | W | L | T | PTS | GF | GA | GP | W | L | T | GF | GA |
|---|---|---|---|---|---|---|---|---|---|---|---|---|---|
| Endicott † | 16 | 11 | 4 | 1 | 23 | 66 | 42 | 27 | 16 | 9 | 2 | 95 | 75 |
| Nichols | 16 | 11 | 5 | 0 | 22 | 59 | 43 | 27 | 17 | 10 | 0 | 94 | 64 |
| Salve Regina * | 16 | 9 | 6 | 1 | 19 | 65 | 43 | 29 | 17 | 11 | 1 | 104 | 75 |
| Suffolk | 16 | 8 | 6 | 2 | 18 | 40 | 47 | 25 | 13 | 10 | 2 | 80 | 81 |
| Wentworth | 16 | 8 | 7 | 1 | 17 | 42 | 46 | 27 | 10 | 15 | 2 | 66 | 94 |
| Johnson & Wales | 16 | 7 | 6 | 3 | 17 | 41 | 40 | 26 | 11 | 11 | 4 | 73 | 69 |
| Becker | 16 | 6 | 9 | 1 | 13 | 46 | 50 | 26 | 10 | 15 | 1 | 82 | 93 |
| Curry | 16 | 5 | 10 | 1 | 11 | 43 | 47 | 25 | 9 | 14 | 2 | 67 | 74 |
| Western New England | 16 | 1 | 13 | 2 | 4 | 25 | 69 | 25 | 2 | 19 | 4 | 41 | 100 |
Championship: March 5, 2016 † indicates conference regular season champion * indicates conference tournament champions

2015–16 ECAC West standings
| | Conference | | | | | | | Overall | | | | | |
| | GP | W | L | T | PTS | GF | GA | GP | W | L | T | GF | GA |
|---|---|---|---|---|---|---|---|---|---|---|---|---|---|
| Hobart †* | 15 | 12 | 3 | 0 | 24 | 68 | 32 | 28 | 21 | 5 | 2 | 111 | 52 |
| Manhattanville | 15 | 8 | 7 | 0 | 16 | 49 | 58 | 26 | 12 | 13 | 1 | 86 | 94 |
| Utica | 15 | 6 | 6 | 3 | 15 | 42 | 44 | 28 | 14 | 10 | 4 | 77 | 71 |
| Neumann | 15 | 6 | 7 | 2 | 14 | 44 | 49 | 27 | 15 | 9 | 3 | 92 | 75 |
| Nazareth | 15 | 5 | 9 | 1 | 11 | 43 | 51 | 26 | 8 | 14 | 4 | 71 | 85 |
| Elmira | 15 | 4 | 9 | 2 | 10 | 46 | 58 | 26 | 11 | 12 | 3 | 88 | 85 |
Championship: March 5, 2016 † indicates conference regular season champion * indicates conference tournament champions

2015–16 NCAA Division III Independent ice hockey standings
| | Overall record | | | | | |
| | GP | W | L | T | GF | GA |
|---|---|---|---|---|---|---|
| Canton State | 27 | 6 | 17 | 4 | 68 | 118 |
| Daniel Webster | 22 | 3 | 18 | 1 | 40 | 98 |

2015–16 Massachusetts State Collegiate Athletic Conference ice hockey standings
| | Conference | | | | | | | Overall | | | | | |
| | GP | W | L | T | PTS | GF | GA | GP | W | L | T | GF | GA |
|---|---|---|---|---|---|---|---|---|---|---|---|---|---|
| Salem State †* | 18 | 16 | 2 | 0 | 32 | 88 | 31 | 28 | 22 | 6 | 0 | 118 | 60 |
| Plymouth State | 18 | 15 | 2 | 1 | 31 | 70 | 35 | 27 | 21 | 5 | 1 | 97 | 57 |
| Fitchburg State | 18 | 7 | 9 | 2 | 16 | 58 | 57 | 27 | 11 | 14 | 2 | 87 | 90 |
| Massachusetts–Dartmouth | 18 | 6 | 9 | 3 | 15 | 51 | 67 | 26 | 7 | 15 | 4 | 72 | 105 |
| Westfield State | 18 | 7 | 11 | 0 | 14 | 60 | 65 | 27 | 13 | 14 | 0 | 94 | 93 |
| Framingham State | 18 | 5 | 12 | 1 | 11 | 42 | 77 | 26 | 6 | 19 | 1 | 62 | 112 |
| Worcester State | 18 | 3 | 14 | 1 | 7 | 36 | 73 | 25 | 6 | 18 | 1 | 53 | 96 |
Championship: March 5, 2016 † indicates conference regular season champion * indicates conference tournament champions

2015–16 Minnesota Intercollegiate Athletic Conference ice hockey standings
| | Conference | | | | | | | | Overall | | | | | |
| | GP | W | L | T | SW | PTS | GF | GA | GP | W | L | T | GF | GA |
|---|---|---|---|---|---|---|---|---|---|---|---|---|---|---|
| Augsburg †* | 16 | 11 | 3 | 2 | 1 | 36 | 64 | 35 | 28 | 17 | 9 | 2 | 101 | 69 |
| St. Thomas | 16 | 10 | 3 | 3 | 1 | 34 | 55 | 36 | 26 | 13 | 8 | 5 | 76 | 40 |
| Saint John's | 16 | 10 | 4 | 2 | 1 | 33 | 58 | 37 | 26 | 10 | 14 | 2 | 76 | 86 |
| Concordia (MN) | 16 | 8 | 7 | 1 | 1 | 26 | 55 | 51 | 26 | 10 | 14 | 2 | 76 | 86 |
| Hamline | 16 | 6 | 8 | 2 | 2 | 22 | 55 | 61 | 27 | 10 | 12 | 5 | 92 | 103 |
| Saint Mary's | 16 | 6 | 9 | 1 | 0 | 19 | 58 | 58 | 25 | 9 | 14 | 2 | 95 | 101 |
| St. Olaf | 16 | 4 | 8 | 4 | 2 | 19 | 48 | 66 | 25 | 6 | 14 | 5 | 76 | 103 |
| Gustavus Adolphus | 16 | 5 | 8 | 3 | 0 | 18 | 37 | 45 | 25 | 6 | 14 | 5 | 52 | 80 |
| Bethel | 16 | 3 | 13 | 0 | 0 | 9 | 39 | 80 | 25 | 4 | 19 | 2 | 62 | 108 |
Championship: March 5, 2016 † indicates conference regular season champion * indicates conference tournament champion

2015–16 New England Hockey Conference standings
| | Conference | | | | | | | Overall | | | | | |
| | GP | W | L | T | PTS | GF | GA | GP | W | L | T | GF | GA |
Division III
| Massachusetts–Boston †* | 18 | 14 | 2 | 2 | 30 | 78 | 40 | 31 | 23 | 5 | 3 | 134 | 69 |
| Babson | 18 | 13 | 3 | 2 | 28 | 61 | 25 | 28 | 19 | 6 | 3 | 96 | 47 |
| Norwich | 18 | 11 | 5 | 2 | 24 | 49 | 35 | 27 | 17 | 8 | 2 | 87 | 59 |
| University of New England | 18 | 9 | 7 | 2 | 20 | 65 | 60 | 27 | 14 | 10 | 3 | 103 | 89 |
| New England College | 18 | 6 | 6 | 6 | 18 | 58 | 51 | 26 | 11 | 9 | 6 | 88 | 68 |
| Castleton | 18 | 7 | 9 | 2 | 16 | 47 | 52 | 26 | 8 | 16 | 2 | 59 | 87 |
| Skidmore | 18 | 5 | 10 | 3 | 13 | 47 | 54 | 26 | 5 | 17 | 4 | 62 | 84 |
| Southern Maine | 18 | 5 | 13 | 0 | 10 | 36 | 70 | 26 | 8 | 17 | 1 | 54 | 91 |
Division II
| Saint Anselm | 18 | 6 | 9 | 3 | 15 | 45 | 48 | 26 | 12 | 11 | 3 | 72 | 64 |
| Saint Michael's | 18 | 3 | 15 | 0 | 6 | 34 | 85 | 24 | 6 | 18 | 0 | 51 | 105 |
Championship: March 5, 2016 † indicates conference regular season champion * indicates conference tournament champion

2015–16 New England Small College Athletic Conference ice hockey standings
| | Conference | | | | | | | Overall | | | | | |
| | GP | W | L | T | PTS | GF | GA | GP | W | L | T | GF | GA |
|---|---|---|---|---|---|---|---|---|---|---|---|---|---|
| Williams † | 18 | 14 | 2 | 2 | 30 | 49 | 27 | 27 | 19 | 6 | 2 | 77 | 45 |
| Trinity * | 18 | 14 | 4 | 0 | 28 | 62 | 38 | 28 | 21 | 6 | 1 | 97 | 63 |
| Bowdoin | 18 | 9 | 5 | 4 | 22 | 53 | 42 | 25 | 13 | 8 | 4 | 80 | 70 |
| Hamilton | 18 | 8 | 6 | 4 | 20 | 46 | 38 | 25 | 13 | 8 | 4 | 72 | 48 |
| Middlebury | 18 | 6 | 5 | 7 | 19 | 46 | 41 | 26 | 8 | 11 | 7 | 64 | 65 |
| Amherst | 18 | 7 | 8 | 3 | 17 | 33 | 38 | 27 | 11 | 12 | 4 | 64 | 71 |
| Colby | 18 | 6 | 9 | 3 | 15 | 41 | 49 | 25 | 9 | 11 | 5 | 63 | 68 |
| Tufts | 18 | 5 | 8 | 5 | 15 | 43 | 42 | 26 | 10 | 10 | 6 | 71 | 60 |
| Wesleyan | 18 | 2 | 9 | 7 | 11 | 39 | 57 | 24 | 2 | 14 | 8 | 52 | 86 |
| Connecticut College | 18 | 0 | 15 | 3 | 3 | 32 | 72 | 24 | 3 | 18 | 3 | 47 | 87 |
Championship: March 6, 2016 † indicates conference regular season champion * indicates conference tournament champion

2015–16 Northern Collegiate Hockey Association standings
| | Conference | | | | | | | Overall | | | | | |
| | GP | W | L | T | PTS | GF | GA | GP | W | L | T | GF | GA |
North
| St. Norbert † | 20 | 17 | 2 | 1 | 35 | 93 | 27 | 31 | 25 | 4 | 2 | 137 | 52 |
| St. Scholastica | 20 | 12 | 7 | 1 | 25 | 74 | 45 | 28 | 15 | 10 | 3 | 100 | 70 |
| Lawrence | 20 | 8 | 9 | 3 | 19 | 57 | 69 | 26 | 9 | 14 | 3 | 68 | 105 |
| MSOE | 20 | 9 | 10 | 1 | 19 | 48 | 46 | 25 | 14 | 10 | 1 | 66 | 57 |
| Northland | 20 | 6 | 12 | 2 | 14 | 46 | 67 | 25 | 7 | 15 | 3 | 59 | 88 |
| Finlandia | 20 | 1 | 17 | 2 | 4 | 28 | 108 | 25 | 1 | 21 | 3 | 34 | 133 |
South
| Adrian †* | 20 | 17 | 2 | 1 | 35 | 124 | 43 | 29 | 24 | 4 | 1 | 156 | 64 |
| Marian | 20 | 15 | 4 | 1 | 31 | 76 | 33 | 28 | 18 | 7 | 3 | 97 | 52 |
| Concordia (WI) | 20 | 7 | 10 | 3 | 17 | 50 | 72 | 26 | 11 | 12 | 3 | 65 | 85 |
| Lake Forest | 20 | 8 | 12 | 0 | 16 | 58 | 81 | 25 | 10 | 15 | 0 | 71 | 101 |
| Aurora | 20 | 2 | 17 | 1 | 5 | 34 | 97 | 25 | 2 | 22 | 1 | 46 | 132 |
Championship: March 5, 2016 † indicates conference regular season champion * indicates conference tournament champion

2015–16 State University of New York Athletic Conference ice hockey standings
| | Conference | | | | | | | Overall | | | | | |
| | GP | W | L | T | PTS | GF | GA | GP | W | L | T | GF | GA |
|---|---|---|---|---|---|---|---|---|---|---|---|---|---|
| Plattsburgh State † | 16 | 12 | 1 | 3 | 27 | 63 | 33 | 27 | 20 | 4 | 3 | 111 | 65 |
| Buffalo State | 16 | 11 | 4 | 1 | 23 | 61 | 30 | 26 | 15 | 7 | 4 | 90 | 56 |
| Geneseo State * | 16 | 9 | 2 | 5 | 23 | 59 | 42 | 31 | 20 | 5 | 6 | 122 | 82 |
| Oswego State | 16 | 8 | 7 | 1 | 17 | 49 | 39 | 27 | 14 | 11 | 2 | 85 | 59 |
| Brockport State | 16 | 6 | 6 | 4 | 16 | 56 | 61 | 26 | 11 | 11 | 4 | 91 | 96 |
| Potsdam State | 16 | 7 | 7 | 2 | 16 | 41 | 49 | 26 | 11 | 11 | 4 | 69 | 79 |
| Fredonia State | 16 | 4 | 10 | 2 | 10 | 50 | 61 | 25 | 8 | 14 | 3 | 87 | 89 |
| Cortland State | 16 | 3 | 10 | 3 | 9 | 36 | 68 | 25 | 9 | 12 | 4 | 73 | 91 |
| Morrisville State | 16 | 1 | 14 | 1 | 3 | 37 | 69 | 24 | 5 | 17 | 2 | 65 | 104 |
Championship: March 5, 2016 † indicates conference regular season champion * indicates conference tournament champions

2015–16 Wisconsin Intercollegiate Athletic Conference ice hockey standings
| | Conference | | | | | | | Overall | | | | | |
| | GP | W | L | T | PTS | GF | GA | GP | W | L | T | GF | GA |
|---|---|---|---|---|---|---|---|---|---|---|---|---|---|
| Wisconsin–River Falls † | 8 | 5 | 2 | 1 | 11 | 22 | 18 | 28 | 16 | 7 | 5 | 79 | 50 |
| Wisconsin–Eau Claire † | 8 | 5 | 2 | 1 | 11 | 32 | 15 | 27 | 15 | 6 | 6 | 103 | 53 |
| Wisconsin–Stevens Point * | 8 | 5 | 3 | 0 | 10 | 37 | 19 | 31 | 24 | 5 | 2 | 150 | 68 |
| Wisconsin–Superior | 8 | 2 | 5 | 1 | 5 | 23 | 41 | 27 | 9 | 15 | 3 | 74 | 96 |
| Wisconsin–Stout | 8 | 1 | 6 | 1 | 3 | 16 | 37 | 29 | 10 | 13 | 6 | 78 | 99 |
Championship: March 5, 2016 † indicates conference regular season champion * indicates conference tournament champion

Note: Mini-game are not included in final standings

== Player stats ==
=== Scoring leaders ===
GP = Games played; G = Goals; A = Assists; Pts = Points; PIM = Penalty minutes

| Player | Class | Team | GP | G | A | Pts | PIM |
|---|---|---|---|---|---|---|---|
| Brandon Zurn | Senior | Hamline | 27 | 19 | 31 | 50 | 18 |
| Charlie Adams | Senior | Hamline | 27 | 21 | 28 | 49 | 26 |
| Stephen Collins | Junior | Geneseo State | 31 | 22 | 25 | 47 | 14 |
| Matthew Lemire | Senior | Massachusetts–Boston | 30 | 17 | 29 | 46 | 18 |
| Joe Kalisz | Senior | Wisconsin–Stevens Point | 31 | 13 | 29 | 42 | 4 |
| Trevor Hills | Junior | Geneseo State | 26 | 22 | 18 | 40 | 20 |
| Dylan Nowakowski | Senior | St. Scholastica | 28 | 13 | 27 | 40 | 29 |
| Frankie DeAugustine | Senior | Massachusetts–Boston | 31 | 16 | 23 | 39 | 20 |
| Adam Knochenmus | Junior | Nazareth | 27 | 22 | 16 | 38 | 14 |
| Kyle Sharkey | Junior | Wisconsin–Stevens Point | 31 | 19 | 19 | 38 | 27 |
| Connor Armour | Freshman | Adrian | 28 | 8 | 38 | 38 | 20 |

=== Leading goaltenders ===
GP = Games played; Min = Minutes played; W = Wins; L = Losses; T = Ties; GA = Goals against; SO = Shutouts; SV% = Save percentage; GAA = Goals against average

| Player | Class | Team | GP | Min | W | L | T | GA | SO | SV% | GAA |
|---|---|---|---|---|---|---|---|---|---|---|---|
| Tony Kujava | Junior | St. Norbert | 20 | 1106 | 15 | 2 | 1 | 29 | 4 | .923 | 1.57 |
| Michael Baldwin | Junior | Marian | 20 | 1161 | 13 | 4 | 3 | 31 | 4 | .931 | 1.60 |
| Michael Pinios | Freshman | Williams | 18 | 1084 | 13 | 4 | 1 | 29 | 2 | .939 | 1.61 |
| Jamie Murray | Senior | Babson | 22 | 1339 | 14 | 5 | 3 | 36 | 4 | .940 | 1.61 |
| Braeden Ostepchuk | Sophomore | Norwich | 21 | 1149 | 14 | 5 | 1 | 32 | 4 | .930 | 1.67 |
| T.J. Black | Freshman | St. Norbert | 13 | 784 | 10 | 2 | 1 | 22 | 2 | .924 | 1.68 |
| Lino Chimienti | Senior | Hobart | 16 | 949 | 11 | 3 | 2 | 27 | 1 | .946 | 1.71 |
| Evan Buitenhuis | Sophomore | Hamilton | 23 | 1379 | 12 | 7 | 4 | 40 | 3 | .943 | 1.74 |
| Tyler Green | Senior | Wisconsin-Eau Claire | 18 | 1086 | 10 | 5 | 3 | 32 | 2 | .944 | 1.77 |
| Alex Morin | Sophomore | Trinity | 17 | 993 | 14 | 3 | 0 | 30 | 0 | .933 | 1.81 |
| Frank Oplinger | Sophomore | Hobart | 13 | 730 | 10 | 2 | 0 | 22 | 2 | .936 | 1.81 |

== 2016 NCAA Tournament ==
First Round; March 12
E2 | Geneseo State | 7
E7 | Salve Regina | 1
E3 | Williams | 7
E6 | Salem State | 1
E4 | Trinity | 0
E5 | Massachusetts–Boston | 4

Quarterfinals; March 15
W1 | Adrian (1) | 2
W3 | Wisconsin–Stevens Point (4) | 5
E2 | Geneseo State | 2
E3 | Williams | 1
W2 | St. Norbert (2) | 6
W4 | Augsburg | 1
E1 | Hobart (3) | 0
E5 | Massachusetts–Boston | 2

Semifinals; March 25
W3 | Wisconsin–Stevens Point (4) | 5
E2 | Geneseo State | 1
W2 | St. Norbert (2) | 8*
E5 | Massachusetts–Boston | 7

National Championship; March 26
W3 | Wisconsin–Stevens Point (4) | 5
W2 | St. Norbert (2) | 1

Note: * denotes overtime period(s)

== Awards ==
=== NCAA ===
| Award | | Recipient |
|---|---|---|
| Sid Watson Award | | Jamie Murray, Babson |
| Edward Jeremiah Award | | Chris Schultz (Geneseo State) & Peter Belisle (Massachusetts–Boston) |
| Tournament Most Outstanding Player | | Eliot Grauer, Wisconsin–Stevens Point |
| East First Team | Position | West First Team |
| Jamie Murray, Babson | G | Tyler Green, Wisconsin–Eau Claire |
| Rich Botting, Plattsburgh State | D | Alex Brooks, Wisconsin–Stevens Point |
| Zander Masucci, Williams | D | Chris Leone, Adrian |
| Stephen Collins, Geneseo State | F | Charlie Adams, Hamline |
| Matt Lemire, Massachusetts–Boston | F | Erik Cooper, St. Norbert |
| Mac Olson, Hobart | F | Joe Kalisz, Wisconsin–Stevens Point |
| East Second Team | Position | West Second Team |
| Lino Chimienti, Hobart | G | Jordyn Kaufer, Augsburg |
| Carl Belizario, Hobart | D | Cory Dunn, Adrian |
| Tyler Bishop, Massachusetts–Boston | D | Blake Thompson, Wisconsin–Stevens Point |
| Mike Davis, Neumann | F | Adam Knochenmus, Wisconsin–Eau Claire |
| Trevor Hills, Geneseo State | F | Dylan Nowakowski, St. Scholastica |
| Chase Nieuwendyk, Brockport State | F | Brandon Zurn, Hamline |
| East Third Team | Position | |
| Marcus Zelzer, Salem State | G | |
| Pat Condon, Geneseo State | D | |
| Mike Vollmin, Babson | D | |
| Tyler Beasley, Nichols | F | |
| Sean Orlando, Trinity | F | |
| Brad Robbins, Hobart | F | |

== See also ==
- 2015–16 NCAA Division I men's ice hockey season
- 2015–16 NCAA Division II men's ice hockey season
