= 2014–15 NCAA Division III men's ice hockey season =

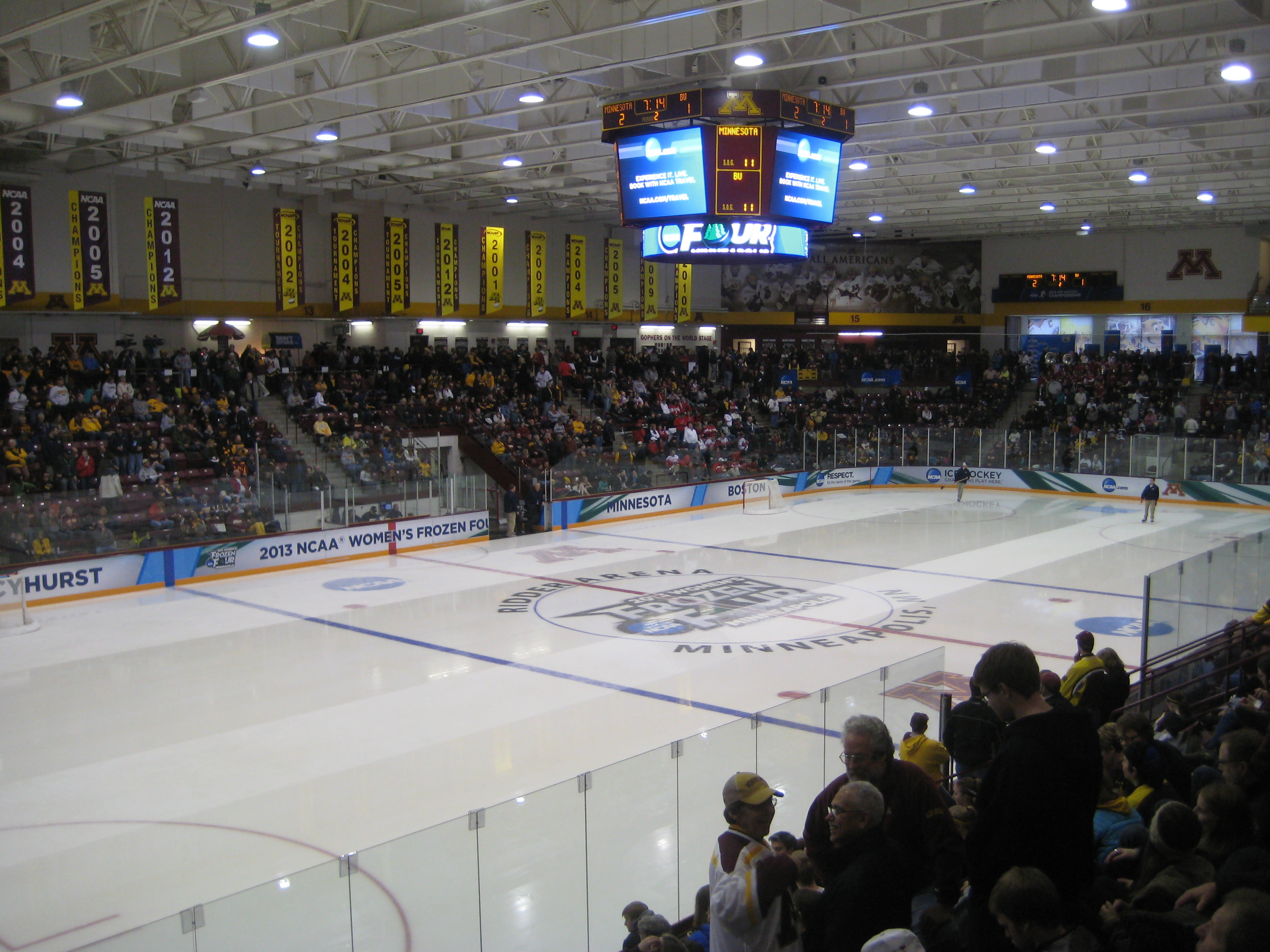
- The Ridder Arena was the host of the 2015 Frozen Four
- Duration: October 31, 2014– March 28, 2015
- NCAA tournament: 2015
- National championship: Ridder Arena; Minneapolis, Minnesota
- NCAA champion: Trinity
- Sid Watson Award: Drew Fielding (St. Thomas)

The 2014–15 NCAA Division III men's ice hockey season began on October 31, 2014, and concluded on March 28, 2015. This was the 42nd season of Division III college ice hockey.

== Regular season ==
=== Standings ===
2014–15 ECAC East standings
| | Conference | | | | | | | Overall | | | | | |
| | GP | W | L | T | PTS | GF | GA | GP | W | L | T | GF | GA |
Division III
| Norwich †* | 18 | 17 | 1 | 0 | 34 | 88 | 24 | 30 | 25 | 4 | 1 | 127 | 45 |
| Massachusetts–Boston | 18 | 16 | 2 | 0 | 32 | 75 | 45 | 27 | 22 | 4 | 1 | 129 | 71 |
| Babson | 18 | 12 | 4 | 2 | 26 | 62 | 33 | 28 | 19 | 6 | 3 | 97 | 48 |
| Castleton State | 18 | 8 | 10 | 0 | 16 | 50 | 53 | 27 | 11 | 16 | 0 | 69 | 77 |
| University of New England | 18 | 7 | 9 | 2 | 16 | 43 | 47 | 25 | 9 | 14 | 2 | 60 | 69 |
| New England College | 18 | 6 | 9 | 3 | 15 | 45 | 50 | 26 | 9 | 12 | 5 | 69 | 70 |
| Skidmore | 18 | 3 | 14 | 1 | 7 | 37 | 65 | 26 | 4 | 19 | 3 | 57 | 107 |
| Southern Maine | 18 | 3 | 14 | 1 | 7 | 17 | 60 | 26 | 6 | 19 | 1 | 35 | 90 |
Division II
| Saint Anselm | 18 | 7 | 9 | 2 | 16 | 53 | 68 | 26 | 4 | 19 | 3 | 57 | 107 |
| Saint Michael's | 18 | 5 | 12 | 1 | 11 | 44 | 69 | 27 | 9 | 16 | 2 | 74 | 96 |
Championship: March 7, 2015 † indicates conference regular season champion * indicates conference tournament champion

2014–15 ECAC Northeast standings
| | Conference | | | | | | | Overall | | | | | |
| | GP | W | L | T | PTS | GF | GA | GP | W | L | T | GF | GA |
|---|---|---|---|---|---|---|---|---|---|---|---|---|---|
| Nichols †* | 14 | 11 | 1 | 2 | 24 | 60 | 25 | 28 | 21 | 4 | 3 | 114 | 59 |
| Salve Regina | 14 | 9 | 4 | 1 | 19 | 55 | 32 | 25 | 12 | 10 | 3 | 86 | 73 |
| Johnson & Wales | 14 | 8 | 6 | 0 | 16 | 38 | 25 | 27 | 15 | 11 | 1 | 82 | 59 |
| Curry | 14 | 7 | 6 | 1 | 15 | 36 | 34 | 27 | 15 | 10 | 2 | 88 | 78 |
| Wentworth | 14 | 6 | 6 | 2 | 14 | 37 | 41 | 26 | 11 | 12 | 3 | 67 | 87 |
| Suffolk | 14 | 5 | 7 | 2 | 12 | 39 | 42 | 26 | 11 | 13 | 2 | 74 | 88 |
| Western New England | 14 | 5 | 9 | 0 | 10 | 33 | 57 | 24 | 5 | 16 | 3 | 52 | 95 |
| Becker | 14 | 1 | 13 | 0 | 2 | 20 | 62 | 25 | 5 | 20 | 0 | 49 | 103 |
Championship: March 7, 2015 † indicates conference regular season champion * indicates conference tournament champions

2014–15 ECAC West standings
| | Conference | | | | | | | Overall | | | | | |
| | GP | W | L | T | PTS | GF | GA | GP | W | L | T | GF | GA |
|---|---|---|---|---|---|---|---|---|---|---|---|---|---|
| Hobart †* | 15 | 12 | 3 | 0 | 24 | 51 | 36 | 28 | 21 | 7 | 0 | 105 | 70 |
| Neumann | 15 | 9 | 5 | 1 | 19 | 63 | 46 | 27 | 14 | 9 | 4 | 99 | 73 |
| Nazareth | 15 | 7 | 4 | 4 | 18 | 51 | 41 | 27 | 12 | 10 | 5 | 86 | 77 |
| Elmira | 15 | 5 | 8 | 2 | 12 | 41 | 47 | 27 | 12 | 12 | 3 | 89 | 87 |
| Utica | 15 | 4 | 8 | 3 | 11 | 35 | 49 | 26 | 11 | 10 | 5 | 74 | 73 |
| Manhattanville | 15 | 2 | 11 | 2 | 6 | 25 | 47 | 26 | 7 | 14 | 5 | 52 | 74 |
Championship: March 7, 2015 † indicates conference regular season champion * indicates conference tournament champions

2014–15 NCAA Division III Independent ice hockey standings
| | Overall record | | | | | |
| | GP | W | L | T | GF | GA |
|---|---|---|---|---|---|---|
| Canton State | 25 | 8 | 16 | 1 | 76 | 105 |

2014–15 Massachusetts State Collegiate Athletic Conference ice hockey standings
| | Conference | | | | | | | Overall | | | | | |
| | GP | W | L | T | PTS | GF | GA | GP | W | L | T | GF | GA |
|---|---|---|---|---|---|---|---|---|---|---|---|---|---|
| Plymouth State †* | 18 | 14 | 3 | 1 | 29 | 78 | 49 | 28 | 16 | 9 | 3 | 110 | 88 |
| Salem State | 18 | 9 | 7 | 2 | 20 | 56 | 46 | 27 | 13 | 11 | 3 | 83 | 77 |
| Fitchburg State | 18 | 8 | 8 | 2 | 18 | 57 | 56 | 26 | 10 | 13 | 3 | 81 | 84 |
| Westfield State | 18 | 8 | 8 | 2 | 18 | 59 | 66 | 27 | 12 | 13 | 2 | 81 | 95 |
| Worcester State | 18 | 7 | 10 | 1 | 15 | 51 | 58 | 26 | 9 | 15 | 2 | 67 | 83 |
| Massachusetts–Dartmouth | 18 | 6 | 9 | 3 | 15 | 64 | 63 | 27 | 8 | 16 | 3 | 85 | 123 |
| Framingham State | 18 | 5 | 12 | 1 | 11 | 50 | 77 | 24 | 6 | 16 | 2 | 65 | 105 |
Championship: March 7, 2015 † indicates conference regular season champion * indicates conference tournament champions

2014–15 Minnesota Intercollegiate Athletic Conference ice hockey standings
| | Conference | | | | | | | | Overall | | | | | |
| | GP | W | L | T | SW | PTS | GF | GA | GP | W | L | T | GF | GA |
|---|---|---|---|---|---|---|---|---|---|---|---|---|---|---|
| St. Thomas † | 16 | 10 | 3 | 3 | 1 | 34 | 53 | 29 | 26 | 16 | 6 | 4 | 77 | 45 |
| Saint Mary's | 16 | 9 | 5 | 2 | 2 | 31 | 56 | 44 | 27 | 15 | 10 | 2 | 97 | 78 |
| Concordia (MN) | 16 | 8 | 5 | 3 | 1 | 28 | 48 | 37 | 26 | 13 | 9 | 4 | 81 | 65 |
| Augsburg | 16 | 9 | 7 | 0 | 0 | 27 | 53 | 53 | 26 | 12 | 14 | 0 | 78 | 84 |
| Hamline * | 16 | 7 | 6 | 3 | 1 | 25 | 48 | 48 | 29 | 14 | 11 | 4 | 89 | 91 |
| Saint John's | 16 | 7 | 7 | 2 | 1 | 24 | 45 | 42 | 25 | 11 | 9 | 5 | 67 | 58 |
| Gustavus Adolphus | 16 | 5 | 5 | 6 | 3 | 24 | 36 | 39 | 25 | 8 | 9 | 8 | 59 | 63 |
| St. Olaf | 16 | 4 | 10 | 2 | 2 | 16 | 32 | 48 | 25 | 6 | 16 | 3 | 49 | 75 |
| Bethel | 16 | 2 | 13 | 1 | 0 | 7 | 34 | 65 | 25 | 4 | 19 | 2 | 61 | 107 |
Championship: March 7, 2015 † indicates conference regular season champion * indicates conference tournament champion

2014–15 New England Small College Athletic Conference ice hockey standings
| | Conference | | | | | | | Overall | | | | | |
| | GP | W | L | T | PTS | GF | GA | GP | W | L | T | GF | GA |
|---|---|---|---|---|---|---|---|---|---|---|---|---|---|
| Trinity † | 18 | 16 | 1 | 1 | 33 | 76 | 28 | 29 | 25 | 3 | 1 | 125 | 53 |
| Amherst * | 18 | 14 | 4 | 0 | 28 | 67 | 40 | 29 | 22 | 5 | 2 | 96 | 62 |
| Connecticut College | 18 | 10 | 7 | 1 | 21 | 52 | 44 | 26 | 14 | 10 | 2 | 72 | 64 |
| Williams | 18 | 10 | 7 | 1 | 21 | 55 | 47 | 27 | 16 | 9 | 2 | 82 | 66 |
| Bowdoin | 18 | 8 | 7 | 3 | 19 | 57 | 50 | 25 | 14 | 8 | 3 | 91 | 59 |
| Hamilton | 18 | 7 | 7 | 4 | 18 | 49 | 46 | 25 | 9 | 10 | 6 | 71 | 65 |
| Middlebury | 18 | 7 | 8 | 3 | 17 | 40 | 46 | 25 | 10 | 12 | 3 | 54 | 63 |
| Tufts | 18 | 5 | 11 | 2 | 12 | 37 | 63 | 26 | 9 | 15 | 2 | 63 | 91 |
| Colby | 18 | 2 | 13 | 3 | 7 | 38 | 66 | 24 | 5 | 16 | 3 | 63 | 83 |
| Wesleyan | 18 | 2 | 16 | 0 | 4 | 27 | 68 | 24 | 3 | 21 | 0 | 47 | 95 |
Championship: March 8, 2015 † indicates conference regular season champion * indicates conference tournament champion

2014–15 Northern Collegiate Hockey Association standings
| | Conference | | | | | | | Overall | | | | | |
| | GP | W | L | T | PTS | GF | GA | GP | W | L | T | GF | GA |
|---|---|---|---|---|---|---|---|---|---|---|---|---|---|
| Adrian †* | 18 | 16 | 1 | 1 | 33 | 97 | 38 | 31 | 24 | 4 | 3 | 146 | 76 |
| St. Norbert | 18 | 13 | 4 | 1 | 27 | 81 | 33 | 28 | 20 | 6 | 2 | 126 | 49 |
| Lake Forest | 18 | 12 | 5 | 1 | 25 | 65 | 38 | 27 | 15 | 7 | 5 | 91 | 62 |
| MSOE | 18 | 11 | 7 | 0 | 22 | 55 | 40 | 28 | 17 | 11 | 0 | 89 | 67 |
| Marian | 18 | 9 | 8 | 1 | 19 | 52 | 60 | 27 | 14 | 12 | 1 | 81 | 82 |
| St. Scholastica | 18 | 8 | 8 | 2 | 18 | 58 | 50 | 28 | 12 | 13 | 3 | 89 | 77 |
| Lawrence | 18 | 6 | 12 | 0 | 12 | 39 | 74 | 27 | 7 | 19 | 1 | 53 | 119 |
| Concordia (WI) | 18 | 4 | 14 | 0 | 8 | 43 | 75 | 27 | 8 | 19 | 0 | 77 | 114 |
| Northland | 18 | 3 | 13 | 2 | 8 | 40 | 79 | 25 | 3 | 18 | 4 | 55 | 105 |
| Finlandia | 18 | 4 | 14 | 0 | 8 | 33 | 76 | 25 | 5 | 19 | 1 | 44 | 105 |
| Aurora ^ | − | − | − | − | − | − | − | 17 | 1 | 15 | 1 | 42 | 93 |
Championship: March 7, 2015 † indicates conference regular season champion * indicates conference tournament champion^ Aurora had been admitted to the NCHA but did not begin a conference schedule until 2015–16

2014–15 State University of New York Athletic Conference ice hockey standings
| | Conference | | | | | | | Overall | | | | | |
| | GP | W | L | T | PTS | GF | GA | GP | W | L | T | GF | GA |
|---|---|---|---|---|---|---|---|---|---|---|---|---|---|
| Plattsburgh State †* | 16 | 13 | 2 | 1 | 27 | 75 | 30 | 28 | 20 | 6 | 2 | 115 | 60 |
| Oswego State | 16 | 12 | 2 | 2 | 26 | 76 | 34 | 28 | 19 | 5 | 4 | 125 | 61 |
| Geneseo State | 16 | 9 | 6 | 1 | 19 | 51 | 34 | 26 | 12 | 10 | 4 | 79 | 60 |
| Potsdam State | 16 | 8 | 6 | 2 | 18 | 51 | 51 | 26 | 12 | 11 | 3 | 82 | 84 |
| Buffalo State | 16 | 7 | 6 | 3 | 17 | 50 | 57 | 27 | 12 | 12 | 3 | 79 | 101 |
| Brockport State | 16 | 6 | 8 | 2 | 14 | 43 | 44 | 27 | 13 | 12 | 2 | 84 | 82 |
| Morrisville State | 16 | 5 | 9 | 2 | 12 | 49 | 71 | 24 | 7 | 12 | 5 | 75 | 97 |
| Cortland State | 16 | 3 | 11 | 2 | 8 | 52 | 77 | 25 | 9 | 13 | 3 | 93 | 107 |
| Fredonia State | 16 | 0 | 13 | 3 | 3 | 26 | 75 | 25 | 4 | 16 | 5 | 55 | 102 |
Championship: March 7, 2015 † indicates conference regular season champion * indicates conference tournament champions

2014–15 Wisconsin Intercollegiate Athletic Conference ice hockey standings
| | Conference | | | | | | | Overall | | | | | |
| | GP | W | L | T | PTS | GF | GA | GP | W | L | T | GF | GA |
|---|---|---|---|---|---|---|---|---|---|---|---|---|---|
| Wisconsin–Stevens Point † | 12 | 10 | 2 | 0 | 20 | 54 | 27 | 31 | 23 | 7 | 1 | 134 | 76 |
| Wisconsin–Eau Claire | 12 | 9 | 3 | 0 | 18 | 46 | 32 | 27 | 18 | 7 | 1 | 104 | 65 |
| Wisconsin–River Falls * | 12 | 7 | 5 | 0 | 14 | 37 | 29 | 28 | 20 | 7 | 1 | 91 | 60 |
| Wisconsin–Stout | 12 | 3 | 9 | 0 | 6 | 28 | 48 | 26 | 8 | 17 | 1 | 71 | 99 |
| Wisconsin–Superior | 12 | 1 | 11 | 0 | 2 | 19 | 48 | 28 | 9 | 18 | 1 | 70 | 89 |
Championship: March 7, 2015 † indicates conference regular season champion * indicates conference tournament champion

Note: Mini-game are not included in final standings

== Player stats ==
=== Scoring leaders ===
GP = Games played; G = Goals; A = Assists; Pts = Points; PIM = Penalty minutes

| Player | Class | Team | GP | G | A | Pts | PIM |
|---|---|---|---|---|---|---|---|
| Kyle Brothers | Freshman | Adrian | 30 | 24 | 25 | 49 | 8 |
| Stephen Buco | Senior | Massachusetts–Boston | 27 | 16 | 32 | 48 | 24 |
| Nick Zappia | Senior | Cortland State | 25 | 24 | 23 | 47 | 28 |
| Josh Ranalli | Senior | Adrian | 31 | 17 | 28 | 45 | 49 |
| Mathew Thompson | Freshman | Adrian | 28 | 23 | 20 | 43 | 18 |
| Shawn Hulshof | Sophomore | Oswego State | 28 | 20 | 22 | 42 | 14 |
| Joe Collins | Junior | SNHU | 28 | 13 | 29 | 42 | 38 |
| William Pelletier | Sophomore | Norwich | 23 | 16 | 25 | 41 | 18 |
| Daniel Broderick | Freshman | Cortland State | 25 | 17 | 23 | 40 | 20 |
| Martin Gruse | Sophomore | Saint Mary's | 27 | 19 | 19 | 38 | 20 |
| Ryan Cole | Sophomore | Trinity | 29 | 16 | 22 | 38 | 24 |
| Alex Botten | Sophomore | Oswego State | 27 | 9 | 29 | 38 | 14 |

=== Leading goaltenders ===
GP = Games played; Min = Minutes played; W = Wins; L = Losses; T = Ties; GA = Goals against; SO = Shutouts; SV% = Save percentage; GAA = Goals against average

| Player | Class | Team | GP | Min | W | L | T | GA | SO | SV% | GAA |
|---|---|---|---|---|---|---|---|---|---|---|---|
| Ty Reichenbach | Sophomore | Norwich | 18 | 1078 | 15 | 2 | 1 | 27 | 3 | .927 | 1.50 |
| Braeden Ostepchuk | Freshman | Norwich | 12 | 672 | 9 | 2 | 0 | 17 | 3 | .914 | 1.52 |
| Justin Gilbert | Junior | Oswego State | 10 | 507 | 6 | 1 | 2 | 13 | 1 | .933 | 1.54 |
| David Jacobson | Senior | St. Norbert | 16 | 942 | 12 | 2 | 1 | 25 | 3 | .924 | 1.59 |
| Drew Fielding | Senior | St. Thomas | 23 | 1400 | 13 | 6 | 4 | 39 | 6 | .934 | 1.67 |
| Jamie Murray | Junior | Babson | 28 | 1680 | 19 | 6 | 3 | 47 | 6 | .940 | 1.68 |
| Tony Kujava | Sophomore | St. Norbert | 13 | 741 | 8 | 4 | 1 | 27 | 5 | .908 | 1.78 |
| Alex Larson | Junior | Nichols | 25 | 1454 | 18 | 3 | 3 | 43 | 5 | .952 | 1.77 |
| Spencer Finney | Junior | Plattsburgh State | 11 | 569 | 8 | 0 | 1 | 17 | 1 | .936 | 1.79 |
| Danny Vitale | Senior | Amherst | 22 | 1183 | 15 | 4 | 2 | 37 | 5 | .933 | 1.88 |

== 2015 NCAA Tournament ==
First Round; March 14
E3 | Norwich (4) | 3
E8 | Plymouth State | 2
E5 | Hobart | 1
E6 | Oswego State | 6
E4 | Trinity | 4
E7 | Nichols | 2

Quarterfinals; March 21
E1 | Amherst (2) | 4*
E3 | Norwich (4) | 3
W2 | Wisconsin–Stevens Point | 4
W3 | Hamline | 2
W1 | Adrian (1) | 5
E6 | Oswego State | 4
E2 | Plattsburgh State (3) | 1
E4 | Trinity | 5

Semifinals; March 27
E1 | Amherst (2) | 2
W2 | Wisconsin–Stevens Point | 6
W1 | Adrian (1) | 3
E4 | Trinity | 5

National Championship; March 28
W2 | Wisconsin–Stevens Point | 2
E4 | Trinity | 5

Note: * denotes overtime period(s)

== Awards ==
=== NCAA ===
| Award | | Recipient |
|---|---|---|
| Sid Watson Award | | Drew Fielding, St. Thomas |
| Edward Jeremiah Award | | Jack Arena (Amherst) |
| Tournament Most Outstanding Player | | Nathaniel Heibron, Trinity |
| East First Team | Position | West First Team |
| Jamie Murray, Babson | G | Leo Podolsky, Lake Forest |
| Bobby Gertsakis, Plattsburgh State | D | Marian Fiala, St. Norbert Green Knights |
| Jake Turrin, Amherst | D | Kevin Gibson, Wisconsin–Stevens Point |
| Ryan Cole, Trinity | F | Ross Anderson, Wisconsin–Eau Claire Blugolds |
| Shawn Hulshof, Oswego State | F | Kyle Brothers, Adrian |
| William Pelletier, Norwich | F | Josh Ranalli, Adrian |
| East Second Team | Position | West Second Team |
| Nathaniel Heilbron, Trinity | G | Drew Fielding, St. Thomas |
| Alec Thieda, Norwich | D | Jack Callahan, Wisconsin–Eau Claire Blugolds |
| Mike Vollmin, Babson | D | Ryan Gieseler, Adrian |
| Stephen Buco, Massachusetts–Boston | F | Charlie Adams, Hamline |
| Jarryd Ten Vaanholt, Elmira | F | Martin Gruse, Saint Mary's |
| Nick Zappia, Cortland State | F | Michael Hill, St. Norbert |
| | F | Joe Kalisz, Wisconsin–Stevens Point |
| East Third Team | Position | |
| Alex Larson, Nichols | G | |
| Michael Flynn, Trinity | D | |
| Kyle Shapiro, Nichols | D | |
| Michael Hawkrigg, Trinity | F | |
| Brad McBride, Hobart | F | |
| Chase Nieuwendyk, Brockport State | F | |

== See also ==
- 2014–15 NCAA Division I men's ice hockey season
- 2014–15 NCAA Division II men's ice hockey season
