= 2013–14 NCAA Division III men's ice hockey season =

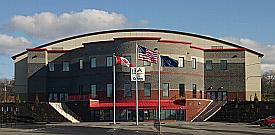
- The Androscoggin Bank Colisée was the host of the 2014 Frozen Four
- Duration: October 26, 2013– March 22, 2014
- NCAA tournament: 2014
- National championship: Androscoggin Bank Colisée; Lewiston, Maine
- NCAA champion: St. Norbert
- Sid Watson Award: David Jacobson (St. Norbert)

The 2013–14 NCAA Division III men's ice hockey season began on October 26, 2013, and concluded on March 22, 2014. This was the 41st season of Division III college ice hockey.

The WIAC began sponsoring ice hockey for the 2013–14 season. Because the conference contained only five active ice hockey programs (below the minimum of seven required by the NCAA) the league did not receive an automatic bid to the NCAA tournament for its conference tournament champion. The NCHA, with only two teams remaining, then merged with the MCHA. The new league would retain the NCHA name and preserve its automatic qualifier.

== Regular season ==
=== Standings ===
2013–14 ECAC East standings
	Conference							Overall					
	GP	W	L	T	PTS	GF	GA	GP	W	L	T	GF	GA
Division III
Norwich †	18	13	3	2	28	65	27	30	20	7	3	114	52
Babson †*	18	13	3	2	28	50	28	29	22	5	2	83	46
Massachusetts–Boston	18	9	5	4	22	60	47	27	17	6	4	114	65
New England College	18	10	8	0	20	47	46	25	14	11	0	74	60
Castleton State	18	8	7	3	19	50	50	27	13	11	3	86	81
University of New England	18	7	11	0	19	46	69	26	10	15	1	73	104
Southern Maine	18	5	11	2	12	42	59	26	6	15	5	62	93
Skidmore	18	3	9	6	12	48	72	27	7	17	3	74	105
Division II
Saint Anselm	18	6	8	4	16	56	55	26	10	12	4	78	72
Saint Michael's	18	3	12	3	9	48	72	27	7	17	3	74	105
Championship: March 8, 2014 † indicates conference regular season champion * indicates conference tournament champion

2013–14 ECAC Northeast standings
	Conference							Overall					
	GP	W	L	T	PTS	GF	GA	GP	W	L	T	GF	GA
Nichols †*	14	9	3	2	20	51	40	28	18	7	3	110	82
Wentworth	14	9	5	0	18	39	37	27	12	13	2	70	77
Salve Regina	14	9	5	0	18	43	33	26	11	15	0	79	97
Johnson & Wales	14	7	6	1	15	51	37	27	18	8	1	90	55
Suffolk	14	6	7	1	13	45	42	25	9	15	1	67	92
Curry	14	6	8	0	12	31	33	27	11	14	2	62	69
Western New England	14	4	9	1	9	39	55	25	10	14	1	71	93
Becker	14	2	9	3	7	34	56	24	3	18	3	54	102
Championship: March 8, 2014 † indicates conference regular season champion * indicates conference tournament champions

2013–14 ECAC West standings
	Conference							Overall					
	GP	W	L	T	PTS	GF	GA	GP	W	L	T	GF	GA
Utica †	15	10	4	1	21	51	37	27	16	7	4	91	65
Elmira *	15	9	5	1	19	62	47	27	16	10	1	109	88
Hobart	15	7	5	3	17	50	46	27	14	9	4	91	77
Manhattanville	15	5	8	2	12	39	49	27	13	12	2	91	80
Neumann	15	4	8	3	11	43	49	26	9	12	5	79	80
Nazareth	15	4	9	2	10	35	52	26	8	16	2	63	85
Championship: March 8, 2014 † indicates conference regular season champion * indicates conference tournament champions

2013–14 NCAA Division III Independent ice hockey standings
	Overall record					
	GP	W	L	T	GF	GA
Canton State	23	6	14	3	56	92

2013–14 Massachusetts State Collegiate Athletic Conference ice hockey standings
	Conference							Overall					
	GP	W	L	T	PTS	GF	GA	GP	W	L	T	GF	GA
Salem State †*	18	11	5	2	24	69	53	28	16	10	2	94	83
Plymouth State †	18	11	5	2	24	71	41	27	14	11	2	99	79
Westfield State	18	10	7	1	21	66	58	27	12	14	1	93	85
Framingham State	18	8	7	3	19	50	57	26	11	11	4	79	85
Fitchburg State	18	8	9	3	17	56	53	26	11	14	1	76	83
Worcester State	18	5	12	1	11	41	73	25	9	15	1	56	89
Massachusetts–Dartmouth	18	5	13	0	10	44	62	25	5	18	2	55	92
Championship: March 8, 2014 † indicates conference regular season champion * indicates conference tournament champions

2013–14 Minnesota Intercollegiate Athletic Conference ice hockey standings
	Conference								Overall					
	GP	W	L	T	SW	PTS	GF	GA	GP	W	L	T	GF	GA
St. Thomas †*	16	13	1	2	2	43	55	19	28	21	5	2	82	41
Gustavus Adolphus	16	12	3	1	1	38	49	26	27	16	7	4	78	59
St. Olaf	16	9	4	3	1	31	51	38	27	12	11	4	81	78
Saint John's	16	10	6	0	0	30	44	34	26	16	10	0	69	57
Concordia (MN)	16	6	6	4	1	24	46	45	26	12	9	5	84	71
Augsburg	16	6	7	3	1	22	44	49	25	13	9	3	79	70
Saint Mary's	16	6	10	0	0	18	48	60	25	10	14	1	69	89
Bethel	16	2	13	1	0	7	25	48	25	3	20	2	45	80
Hamline	16	1	15	0	0	3	23	66	25	2	22	1	40	109
Championship: March 8, 2014 † indicates conference regular season champion * indicates conference tournament champion

2013–14 New England Small College Athletic Conference ice hockey standings
	Conference							Overall					
	GP	W	L	T	PTS	GF	GA	GP	W	L	T	GF	GA
Trinity †	18	15	3	0	30	77	45	26	21	5	0	121	66
Amherst	18	12	4	2	26	57	35	27	16	8	3	80	58
Williams	18	10	5	3	23	44	33	26	15	8	3	72	52
Middlebury	18	9	7	2	20	58	46	25	11	11	3	76	68
Bowdoin *	18	9	8	1	19	62	57	28	17	9	2	109	81
Colby	18	8	9	1	17	45	62	25	11	11	3	73	87
Connecticut College	18	8	9	1	17	48	52	25	9	14	2	60	79
Wesleyan	18	6	11	1	13	53	63	25	11	12	2	81	86
Hamilton	18	4	12	2	10	43	65	23	5	15	3	56	83
Tufts	18	2	15	1	5	41	70	24	4	19	1	60	92
Championship: March 9, 2014 † indicates conference regular season champion * indicates conference tournament champion

2013–14 Northern Collegiate Hockey Association standings
	Conference							Overall					
	GP	W	L	T	PTS	GF	GA	GP	W	L	T	GF	GA
St. Norbert †*	18	16	2	0	32	88	22	32	28	3	1	153	46
Adrian	18	14	1	3	31	77	41	29	22	3	4	119	66
St. Scholastica	18	10	5	3	23	63	37	29	16	9	4	96	68
Lake Forest	18	11	7	0	22	70	59	28	15	12	3	92	84
Marian	18	10	7	1	21	56	43	27	12	13	2	81	70
Concordia (WI)	18	7	9	2	16	61	75	27	10	13	4	91	110
MSOE	18	6	12	0	12	36	48	27	9	17	1	45	79
Lawrence	18	5	12	1	11	41	65	27	6	19	2	58	111
Northland	18	4	14	0	8	38	100	25	4	21	0	54	146
Finlandia	18	2	16	0	4	38	78	24	3	20	1	50	107
Championship: March 8, 2014 † indicates conference regular season champion * indicates conference tournament champion

2013–14 State University of New York Athletic Conference ice hockey standings
	Conference							Overall					
	GP	W	L	T	PTS	GF	GA	GP	W	L	T	GF	GA
Geneseo State †	16	14	2	0	28	67	40	30	23	7	0	122	82
Plattsburgh State	16	12	2	2	26	68	28	26	19	5	2	101	50
Oswego State *	16	10	5	1	21	62	41	31	22	7	2	123	72
Buffalo State	16	6	6	4	16	47	41	27	10	12	5	76	70
Brockport State	16	7	8	1	15	49	57	26	10	13	3	80	94
Fredonia State	16	4	7	5	13	45	55	26	7	13	6	65	86
Cortland State	16	4	10	2	10	48	68	24	5	16	3	72	106
Potsdam State	16	4	10	2	10	45	62	25	9	14	2	73	91
Morrisville State	16	2	13	1	5	46	85	24	5	17	2	77	124
Championship: March 8, 2014 † indicates conference regular season champion * indicates conference tournament champions

2013–14 Wisconsin Intercollegiate Athletic Conference ice hockey standings
	Conference							Overall					
	GP	W	L	T	PTS	GF	GA	GP	W	L	T	GF	GA
Wisconsin–River Falls †	12	8	4	0	16	39	32	27	15	9	3	77	64
Wisconsin–Stevens Point	12	7	4	1	15	46	28	30	22	6	2	133	58
Wisconsin–Eau Claire *	12	6	5	1	13	34	27	28	19	8	1	93	50
Wisconsin–Superior	12	3	7	2	8	27	40	29	11	15	3	70	80
Wisconsin–Stout	12	4	8	0	8	27	46	26	8	18	0	67	95
Championship: March 8, 2014 † indicates conference regular season champion * indicates conference tournament champion

Note: Mini-game are not included in final standings

== Player stats ==
=== Scoring leaders ===
GP = Games played; G = Goals; A = Assists; Pts = Points; PIM = Penalty minutes

Player	Class	Team	GP	G	A	Pts	PIM
Jackson Brewer	Junior	Trinity	26	14	42	56	12
Michael Hawkrigg	Junior	Trinity	25	22	30	52	21
Ryan Cole	Freshman	Trinity	26	19	29	48	22
Cullen Bradshaw	Junior	St. Norbert	32	15	27	42	14
Sean Orlando	Freshman	Trinity	25	23	17	40	14
Peter MacIntyre	Sophomore	Massachusetts–Boston	26	18	22	40	30
Garrett Ladd	Junior	Wisconsin–Stevens Point	27	18	22	40	8
Matt Gabrione	Sophomore	SNHU	26	18	21	39	36
Colin Downey	Senior	Bowdoin	28	14	25	39	22
Joe Collins	Sophomore	SNHU	26	17	21	38	32
Travis Janke	Senior	Norwich	30	16	22	38	2
Mason Baptista	Junior	St. Norbert	32	11	27	38	24

=== Leading goaltenders ===
GP = Games played; Min = Minutes played; W = Wins; L = Losses; T = Ties; GA = Goals against; SO = Shutouts; SV% = Save percentage; GAA = Goals against average

Player	Class	Team	GP	Min	W	L	T	GA	SO	SV%	GAA
Jay Deo	Freshman	Wisconsin-Eau Claire	10	595	8	0	1	7	5	.972	0.71
David Jacobson	Junior	St. Norbert	26	1569	24	1	1	33	7	.936	1.26
Drew Fielding	Junior	St. Thomas	27	1632	20	5	2	39	7	.942	1.43
Jamie Murray	Sophomore	Babson	28	1679	21	5	2	42	4	.948	1.50
Chris Czarnota	Senior	Norwich	16	899	10	4	1	23	4	.908	1.53
Matic Marinšek	Junior	Norwich	14	765	8	3	2	21	2	.905	1.65
Mathieu Cadieux	Senior	Plattsburgh State	25	1458	18	5	2	40	4	.935	1.65
Sean Dougherty	Sophomore	Williams	25	1479	14	8	3	45	2	.938	1.83
Gordon Ceasar	Sophomore	Plymouth State	16	966	10	4	2	30	4	.938	1.86
John McLean	Sophomore	Gustavus Adolphus	26	1525	15	6	4	50	1	.920	1.97

== 2014 NCAA Tournament ==
First Round; March 12–13
E2	Geneseo State (4)	3
E7	Nichols	2
E3	Norwich	8
E6	Salem State	2
E4	Oswego State	4
E5	Bowdoin	3

Quarterfinals; March 15–16
W1	St. Norbert (1)	7
W4	Adrian	2
E2	Geneseo State (4)	3
E3	Norwich	2
W2	St. Thomas (3)	0
W3	Wisconsin–Stevens Point	3
E1	Babson (2)	0
E4	Oswego State	3

Semifinals; March 21
W1	St. Norbert (1)	6
E2	Geneseo State (4)	2
W3	Wisconsin–Stevens Point	2
E4	Oswego State	1

National Championship; March 22
W1	St. Norbert (1)	3
W3	Wisconsin–Stevens Point	1

Note: * denotes overtime period(s)

== Awards ==
=== NCAA ===
Award		Recipient
Sid Watson Award		David Jacobson, St. Norbert
Edward Jeremiah Award		Chris Schultz (Geneseo State)
Tournament Most Outstanding Player		Joe Perry, St. Norbert
East First Team	Position	West First Team
Jamie Murray, Babson	G	David Jacobson, St. Norbert
Louis Bélisle, Middlebury	D	Kyle Brodie, Wisconsin–Stevens Point
Ryan Heavey, Babson	D	Caleb Suderman, Concordia (MN)
Jackson Brewer, Trinity	F	Alex Altenbernd, St. Thomas
Travis Janke, Norwich	F	Garrett Ladd, Adrian
Zachary Vit, Geneseo State	F	Joe Perry, St. Norbert
East Second Team	Position	West Second Team
Sean Dougherty, Williams	G	Drew Fielding, St. Thomas
Michael Flynn, Trinity	D	David Donnellan, Wisconsin–Eau Claire Blugolds
Barry Roytman, Plattsburgh State	D	Marian Fiala, St. Norbert
Michael Hawkrigg, Trinity	F	Mason Baptista, St. Norbert
Trever Hertz, Utica	F	Duston Hebebrand, Adrian
Peter MacIntyre, Massachusetts–Boston	F	Corey Leivermann, Gustavus Adolphus
East Third Team	Position	
Kevin Carr, Buffalo State	G	
Colin Downey, Bowdoin	D	
Anton Racklin, Manhattanville	D	
Mike Driscoll, Babson	F	
Alex Jensen, Plattsburgh State	F	
Josh Obregon, Johnson & Wales	F	

== See also ==
- 2013–14 NCAA Division I men's ice hockey season
- 2013–14 NCAA Division II men's ice hockey season
