= Mike Vollmin =

American-Swiss ice hockey player

Mike Völlmin
- Born: 13 May 1993 (age 32) Wilmington, North Carolina, U.S.
- Height: 6 ft 0 in (183 cm)
- Weight: 181 lb (82 kg; 12 st 13 lb)
- Position: Defense
- Shoots: Right
- SL team Former teams: HC Sierre; SC Langenthal; Genève-Servette HC
- NHL draft: Undrafted
- Playing career: 2016–present

Michael C. Vollmin (born 13 May 1993) is a Swiss American professional ice hockey defenseman currently playing for HC Sierre of the Swiss League (SL).

== Playing career ==
=== Junior ===
A defenseman, Vollmin has dual citizenship in the United States and Switzerland, parts of his family come from Switzerland. He played ice hockey at New Hampton School in New Hampshire and for the Northern Cyclones of the Metropolitan Junior Hockey League before enrolling at Babson College in 2012. In his four year at Babson, Vollmin received New England Hockey Conference (NEHC) first team honors in 2015 and 2016 as well as ECAC East all-conference first team honors and ACHA/CCM All-America East second team recognition in 2015. He also made the 2015 New England Hockey Writers Association All-Star team. He also served as Junior Assistant Captain for Babson's hockey team.

=== Professional ===
He inked his first pro contract with SC Langenthal of the Swiss second division Swiss League (SL) in March 2016. Vollmin made his SL debut in the 2016–17 season and eventually won the SL title with SC Langenthal. He went on to play 87 regular season games over 2 seasons, as well as 27 playoffs games with SC Langenthal.

In February 2018, Genève-Servette HC of the Swiss top-flight NL announced to have signed Vollmin to a two-year deal starting with the 2018–19 season and through the 2019–20 season. On 15 June 2020, Völlmin was signed to a two-year contract extension by Servette through to the end of the 2021/22 campaign.

In May 2025, he inked a deal with HC Sierre of the Swiss League.
