= 1996–97 NCAA Division III men's ice hockey season =

- Duration: October 1996– March 22, 1997
- NCAA tournament: 1997
- National championship: Nelson Recreation Center; Middlebury, Vermont
- NCAA champion: Middlebury
- Sid Watson Award: Steve Toll (RIT)

The 1996–97 NCAA Division III men's ice hockey season began in November 1996 and concluded on March 22, 1997. This was the 24th season of Division III college ice hockey.

== Regular season ==
=== Season tournaments ===
Tournament	Dates	Teams	Champion
Blue Devil Invitational	October 25–26	4	Mercyhurst
Pepsi Invitational	November 1–2	4	
RIT Tournament	November 1–2	4	RIT
Canisius Invitational	November 3–4	4	Canisius
Cardinal Classic	November 29–30	4	Plattsburgh State
Charles Luce Tournament	November 30–December 1	4	Connecticut College
Hamot Hockey Classic	December 13–14	4	Mercyhurst
Codfish Bowl	December 28–29	4	Norwich
Holy Cross Tournament	January 3–4	4	Plattsburgh State
Elmira Tournament	January 4–5	4	Niagara

=== Standings ===
1996–97 ECAC East standings
	Conference							Overall					
	GP	W	L	T	PTS	GF	GA	GP	W	L	T	GF	GA
Middlebury †	19	16	1	2	34	120	41	27	22	3	2	154	68
Norwich	19	15	3	1	31	97	41	30	21	7	2		
Williams	19	14	4	1	29	80	44	25	16	8	1		
Hamilton	19	14	4	1	29	95	51	26	19	6	1		
Colby *	19	13	5	1	27	103	62	27	19	7	1		
Amherst	19	11	7	1	23	83	66	25	14	10	1		
Saint Anselm	19	11	8	0	22	69	73	25	16	9	0	99	86
Bowdoin	19	11	8	0	22	92	63	27	15	12	0		
Holy Cross	19	11	8	0	22	72	57	27	14	13	0	107	84
Babson	19	9	9	1	19	54	63	25	11	13	1	76	76
Trinity	19	9	10	0	18	69	75	24	11	13	0		
Salem State	19	8	9	2	18	65	77	24	12	10	2		
Connecticut	19	8	9	2	18	78	73	25	11	12	2	109	95
Connecticut College	19	6	13	0	12	62	73	22	8	14	0	80	93
Massachusetts–Boston	19	6	13	0	12	77	80	22	8	14	0	90	90
New England College	19	6	13	0	12	60	113	25	8	17	0		
North Adams State	19	5	14	0	10	61	119	22	9	12	1		
American International	19	4	13	2	10	58	83	25	5	18	2		
Southern Maine	19	4	15	0	8	43	98	25	4	21	0	62	141
Wesleyan	19	2	17	0	4	49	126	24	3	21	0	62	151
Championship: March 8, 1997 † indicates conference regular season champion * indicates conference tournament champion

1996–97 ECAC North/South/Central standings
	Division							Overall					
	GP	W	L	T	Pct.	GF	GA	GP	W	L	T	GF	GA
Central Division
Bentley ~†	14	12	2	0	24	92	52	28	18	9	1	150	124
Saint Michael's	14	11	2	1	23	92	51	25	17	7	1	127	95
Massachusetts–Dartmouth *	14	10	2	2	22	90	39	27	21	4	2		
Assumption	14	7	6	1	15	64	62	27	14	12	1		
Stonehill	14	5	9	0	10	49	81	24	8	16	0		
New Hampshire College	14	4	10	0	8	47	67	23	6	16	1	77	121
Tufts	14	4	10	0	8	39	71	23	8	13	2		
Suffolk	14	1	13	0	2	34	84	24	5	19	0		
North Division
Fitchburg State ~	12	10	2	0	20	93	34	28	18	9	2		
Plymouth State	12	8	3	1	17	61	47	22	12	9	1		
Worcester State	12	7	4	1	15	50	39	25	13	11	1		
Framingham State	12	7	5	0	14	53	44	26	15	10	1		
Curry	12	4	7	1	9	46	68	24	10	13	1		
Nichols	12	3	8	1	7	42	75	20	4	13	3	74	120
Roger Williams	12	1	11	0	2	27	66						
South Division
Skidmore ~	14	12	2	0	24	63	33	24	15	8	1		
Sacred Heart	14	10	4	0	20	63	43	25	15	10	0	115	98
Fairfield	14	9	4	1	19	61	45	26	13	12	1	103	117
Quinnipiac	14	8	6	0	16	55	31	27	13	12	2	85	80
Western New England	14	7	6	1	15	47	56	22	10	11	1		
Wentworth	14	4	10	0	8	38	62	24	6	18	0	57	110
Iona	14	2	11	1	5	35	72	25	2	20	3		
Villanova	14	2	11	1	5	35	72						
Championship: March 12, 1997; ~ indicates division regular season champions † indicates conference regular season champion * indicates conference tournament champion

1996–97 ECAC West standings
	Conference							Overall					
	GP	W	L	T	PTS	GF	GA	GP	W	L	T	GF	GA
RIT †*	10	8	1	1	17	53	31	30	21	7	2	182	111
Niagara ^	10	6	2	2	14	57	32	27	16	9	2	153	86
Elmira	10	5	3	2	12	44	36	29	15	9	5	127	115
Mercyhurst	10	5	4	1	11	56	40	27	16	9	2	152	89
Canisius	10	1	7	2	4	37	51	26	13	11	2	111	98
Hobart	10	1	9	0	2	39	95	25	6	18	1	107	176
Championship: March 8, 1997 † indicates conference regular season champion * indicates conference tournament champions^ Niagara was ineligible for postseason play

1996–97 NCAA Division III Independent ice hockey standings
	Overall record					
	GP	W	L	T	GF	GA
Lawrence	7	1	5	1		
Scranton	25	10	14	1		

1996–97 Minnesota Intercollegiate Athletic Conference ice hockey standings
	Conference							Overall					
	GP	W	L	T	Pts	GF	GA	GP	W	L	T	GF	GA
Saint John's †*	16	14	2	0	28	101	47	33	26	6	1	169	96
St. Thomas	16	13	3	0	26	102	47	27	18	9	0	152	93
Gustavus Adolphus	16	11	5	0	22	86	45	29	17	12	0	131	101
Saint Mary's	16	10	5	1	21	84	54	27	15	11	1	126	104
Augsburg	16	9	7	0	18	82	74	25	14	10	1	137	111
Bethel	16	5	10	1	11	59	75	25	7	17	1	89	121
Concordia (MN)	16	4	10	2	10	67	92	26	7	15	4	118	151
St. Olaf	16	3	13	0	6	51	96	25	4	20	1	75	141
Hamline	16	1	15	0	2	42	144	25	2	23	0	69	208
Championship: March 9, 1997 † indicates conference regular season champion * indicates conference tournament champion

1996–97 Northern Collegiate Hockey Association standings
	Conference							Overall					
	GP	W	L	T	Pts	GF	GA	GP	W	L	T	GF	GA
St. Norbert †	20	16	4	0	32	90	52	31	21	9	1	128	93
Wisconsin–Stevens Point	20	14	5	1	29	88	50	27	17	8	2	119	75
Bemidji State	20	14	5	1	29	104	64	34	26	6	2	183	102
Wisconsin–Superior *	20	13	6	1	27	85	54	34	23	9	2	129	78
Wisconsin–River Falls	20	13	7	0	26	77	55	31	20	11	0	117	87
Wisconsin–Eau Claire	20	7	12	1	15	76	98	28	10	16	2	111	130
Wisconsin–Stout	20	6	14	0	12	75	103	27	9	18	0	99	127
St. Scholastica	20	3	16	1	7	43	90	25	7	17	1	63	104
Lake Forest	20	1	18	1	3	48	117	24	4	19	1	65	127
Championship: March 8, 1997 † indicates conference regular season champion * indicates conference tournament champion Bemidji State was ineligible for Division III tournaments

1996–97 State University of New York Athletic Conference ice hockey standings
	Conference							Overall					
	GP	W	L	T	PTS	GF	GA	GP	W	L	T	GF	GA
Fredonia State †	14	11	3	0	22	53	32	29	16	11	2	84	83
Plattsburgh State *	14	10	3	1	21	70	35	31	22	6	3	159	84
Potsdam State	14	9	3	2	18	62	43	27	13	12	2	115	117
Oswego State	14	8	5	1	17	63	49	26	13	11	2	116	92
Geneseo State	14	5	5	4	14	47	51	24	12	6	6	103	83
Brockport State	14	4	9	1	9	47	65	26	8	17	1	98	129
Buffalo State	14	0	12	2	2	30	80	25	3	20	2	68	140
Cortland State	14	3	11	1	7	46	63	24	7	16	1	76	121
Championship: March 8, 1997 † indicates conference regular season champion * indicates conference tournament champions

Note: Mini-game are not included in final standings

== 1997 NCAA Tournament ==
Quarterfinals; March 14–15
Norwich	3	5	-
Plattsburgh State	3	2	-
St. Norbert	2	1	0
Wisconsin–Superior	0	4	1
Saint John's	2	4	-
Elmira	2	2	-
Middlebury	6	6	-
RIT	4	3	-

Semifinals; March 21
Norwich	1
Wisconsin–Superior	2**
Saint John's	1
Middlebury	4

National championship March 22
Wisconsin–Superior	2
Middlebury	3
Third-place game
Norwich	3
Saint John's	4

Note: * denotes overtime period(s)

== See also ==
- 1996–97 NCAA Division I men's ice hockey season
- 1996–97 NCAA Division II men's ice hockey season
