= 2008–09 NCAA Division III men's ice hockey season =

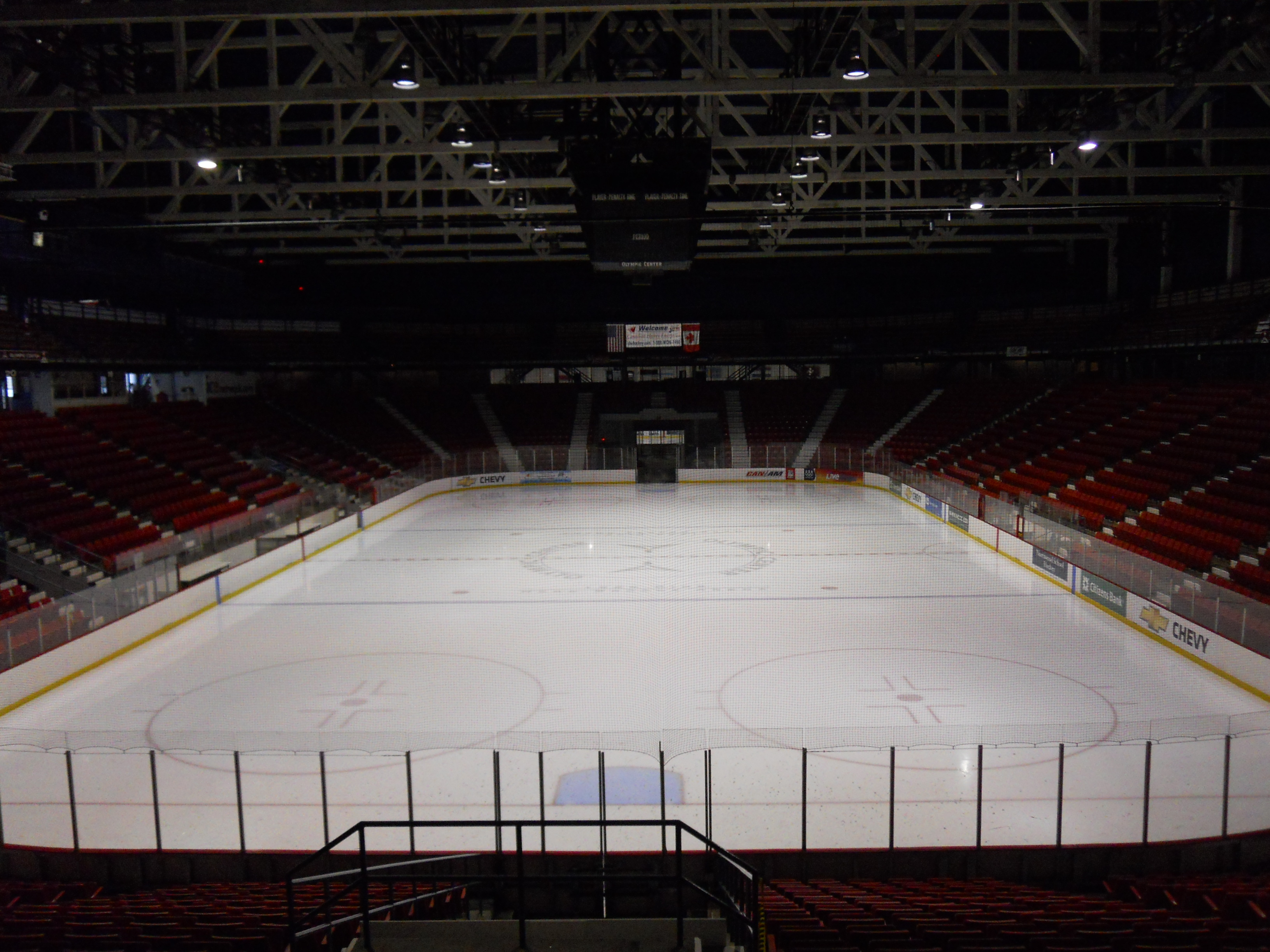
- Herb Brooks Arena was the host of the 2009 Frozen Four
- Duration: October 17, 2008– March 21, 2009
- NCAA tournament: 2009
- National championship: Herb Brooks Arena; Lake Placid, New York
- NCAA champion: Neumann
- Sid Watson Award: Jeff Landers (Amherst)

The 2008–09 NCAA Division III men's ice hockey season began on October 17, 2008, and concluded on March 21 of the following year. This was the 36th season of Division III college ice hockey.

== Regular season ==
=== Standings ===
2008–09 ECAC East standings
	Conference							Overall					
	GP	W	L	T	PTS	GF	GA	GP	W	L	T	GF	GA
Division III
Norwich †	19	11	5	3	25	73	41	25	13	8	4	85	55
Castleton State	19	11	6	2	24	61	49	26	15	9	2	82	64
Salem State	19	10	8	1	21	58	55	25	14	9	2	87	73
New England College	19	9	8	2	20	51	51	27	15	10	2	91	69
Southern Maine	19	8	8	3	19	63	65	26	11	12	3	84	85
Skidmore	19	8	8	3	19	54	53	26	13	10	3	80	74
Babson *	19	9	10	0	18	66	55	28	13	14	1	90	80
Massachusetts–Boston	19	4	14	1	9	48	76	28	10	16	2	85	100
Division II
Saint Anselm	19	6	12	1	13	56	78	26	10	15	1	79	106
Saint Michael's ~	19	4	14	1	9	36	88	28	11	15	2	74	113
ECAC East Championship: March 7, 2009; Northeast-10 Championship: March 7, 2009 † indicates conference regular season champion * indicates conference tournament champion ~ indicates Northeast-10 Tournament champion

2008–09 ECAC Northeast standings
	Conference							Overall					
	GP	W	L	T	PTS	GF	GA	GP	W	L	T	GF	GA
Division III
Nichols †*	17	16	1	0	32	89	36	29	25	4	0	128	69
Curry	17	15	1	1	31	99	39	27	20	5	2	134	70
Wentworth	17	13	3	1	27	94	44	27	18	8	1	134	74
Massachusetts–Dartmouth	17	13	3	1	27	58	34	26	16	8	2	77	58
Fitchburg State	17	9	5	3	21	62	47	27	13	9	5	86	77
Becker	17	9	7	1	19	51	55	26	11	14	1	67	92
Johnson & Wales	17	8	7	2	18	58	60	26	9	14	3	74	106
Westfield State	17	7	7	3	17	70	59	24	11	9	4	106	87
Suffolk	17	7	7	3	17	53	60	25	8	14	3	64	92
Plymouth State	17	7	8	2	16	55	56	25	11	12	2	75	92
Worcester State	17	4	10	3	11	61	81	24	6	15	3	81	112
Western New England	17	3	12	2	8	33	74	25	3	20	2	43	125
Salve Regina	17	3	13	1	7	63	86	22	3	17	2	70	110
Framingham State	17	0	14	3	3	36	97	25	5	18	2	58	156
Division II
Southern New Hampshire	17	7	8	2	16	65	71	24	9	13	2	91	100
Stonehill	17	7	9	1	15	65	61	24	10	13	1	88	87
Assumption	17	4	10	3	11	54	77	26	6	16	4	74	111
Franklin Pierce	17	4	11	2	10	49	78	25	5	18	2	64	115
ECAC Northeast Championship: March 7, 2009; Northeast-10 Championship: March 7, 2009 † indicates conference regular season champion * indicates conference tournament champions ~ indicates Northeast-10 Tournament champion

2008–09 ECAC West standings
	Conference							Overall					
	GP	W	L	T	PTS	GF	GA	GP	W	L	T	GF	GA
Elmira †	15	9	3	3	21	63	33	27	16	8	3	112	63
Manhattanville	15	8	3	4	20	53	35	25	16	4	5	91	50
Hobart	15	9	4	2	20	58	33	30	21	7	2	121	68
Neumann *	15	8	5	2	18	70	52	32	21	9	2	134	94
Utica	15	5	9	1	11	54	56	26	11	12	3	101	82
Lebanon Valley	15	0	15	0	0	25	114	25	0	25	0	44	175
Championship: March 7, 2009 † indicates conference regular season champion * indicates conference tournament champions

2008–09 Midwest Collegiate Hockey Association standings
	Conference							Overall					
	GP	W	L	T	PTS	GF	GA	GP	W	L	T	GF	GA
Adrian †*	20	20	0	0	40	127	25	29	27	1	1	189	63
Lawrence	20	14	5	1	29	64	37	28	16	11	1	81	68
MSOE	20	12	7	1	25	70	49	29	15	12	2	86	80
Marian	20	11	8	1	23	65	53	28	13	12	3	92	85
Finlandia	20	10	8	2	22	69	51	25	10	13	2	78	80
Minnesota–Crookston	20	5	15	0	10	51	99	27	6	21	0	65	132
Concordia (WI)	20	4	16	0	8	51	109	27	4	22	1	64	145
Northland	20	1	18	1	3	23	97	27	1	25	1	31	159
Championship: March 1, 2009 † indicates conference regular season champion * indicates conference tournament champions

2008–09 Minnesota Intercollegiate Athletic Conference ice hockey standings
	Conference							Overall					
	GP	W	L	T	Pts	GF	GA	GP	W	L	T	GF	GA
St. Olaf †	16	12	1	3	27	66	39	26	16	7	3	100	72
Gustavus Adolphus *	16	10	6	0	20	58	36	30	19	11	0	112	80
St. Thomas	16	9	5	2	20	66	49	26	12	11	3	92	82
Hamline	16	9	7	0	18	71	54	28	16	11	1	113	85
Augsburg	16	8	7	1	17	73	64	26	9	16	1	98	107
Bethel	16	8	8	0	16	49	61	25	11	13	1	73	88
Saint John's	16	7	8	1	15	47	50	25	10	14	1	74	81
Saint Mary's	16	3	12	1	7	46	93	25	4	20	1	60	150
Concordia (MN)	16	1	13	2	4	35	65	25	4	19	2	62	96
Championship: March 4, 2009 † indicates conference regular season champion * indicates conference tournament champion

2008–09 New England Small College Athletic Conference ice hockey standings
	Conference							Overall					
	GP	W	L	T	PTS	GF	GA	GP	W	L	T	GF	GA
Amherst †*	19	16	2	1	33	72	30	28	22	5	1	98	41
Middlebury	19	14	4	1	29	91	47	27	19	7	1	119	69
Williams	19	12	5	2	26	61	54	26	15	9	2	72	74
Trinity	19	12	7	0	24	67	46	25	16	9	0	90	62
Connecticut College	19	9	7	3	21	57	48	25	13	9	3	75	65
Bowdoin	19	8	9	2	18	63	60	25	11	12	2	87	72
Hamilton	19	8	11	0	16	54	60	25	9	15	1	67	84
Tufts	19	7	10	2	16	46	70	25	11	12	2	71	83
Wesleyan	19	4	13	2	10	40	68	23	4	17	2	43	81
Colby	19	4	13	2	10	46	69	24	6	15	3	56	78
Championship: March 7, 2009 † indicates conference regular season champion * indicates conference tournament champion

2008–09 Northern Collegiate Hockey Association standings
	Conference							Overall					
	GP	W	L	T	Pts	GF	GA	GP	W	L	T	GF	GA
Wisconsin–Superior †	14	11	1	2	24	52	29	30	23	4	3	128	61
Wisconsin–Stout *	14	10	2	2	22	49	35	31	23	6	2	127	81
St. Scholastica	14	9	4	1	19	45	29	29	20	7	2	102	85
St. Norbert	14	8	5	1	17	46	33	28	19	8	1	109	62
Wisconsin–Stevens Point	14	6	7	1	13	44	48	27	15	10	2	105	79
Wisconsin–River Falls	14	4	9	1	9	38	48	27	10	15	2	69	77
Wisconsin–Eau Claire	14	3	10	1	7	37	43	27	13	13	1	85	70
Lake Forest	14	0	13	1	1	21	67	27	5	20	2	57	113
Championship: March 7, 2009 † indicates conference regular season champion * indicates conference tournament champion

2008–09 State University of New York Athletic Conference ice hockey standings
	Conference							Overall					
	GP	W	L	T	PTS	GF	GA	GP	W	L	T	GF	GA
Plattsburgh State †*	16	15	0	1	31	81	25	28	24	2	2	135	54
Oswego State	16	11	4	1	23	66	39	27	18	8	1	116	74
Geneseo State	16	8	7	1	17	54	60	27	14	12	1	83	89
Brockport State	16	7	7	2	16	55	61	27	14	10	3	95	90
Potsdam State	16	6	6	4	16	58	61	26	9	12	5	104	103
Buffalo State	16	5	7	4	14	65	63	26	10	12	4	107	87
Cortland State	16	5	9	2	12	52	67	25	8	15	2	90	104
Fredonia State	16	4	8	4	12	47	56	24	6	13	5	61	81
Morrisville State	16	1	14	1	3	38	84	25	5	19	1	70	123
Championship: March 7, 2009 † indicates conference regular season champion * indicates conference tournament champions

Note: Mini-game are not included in final standings

== Player stats ==
=== Scoring leaders ===
GP = Games played; G = Goals; A = Assists; Pts = Points; PIM = Penalty minutes

Player	Class	Team	GP	G	A	Pts	PIM
Shawn Skelly	Sophomore	Adrian	28	30	35	65	66
Adam Krug	Senior	Adrian	28	22	30	52	61
Eric Miller	Sophomore	Adrian	25	18	34	52	98
Jason Hill	Senior	Buffalo State	25	10	39	49	36
Jeff Hazelwood	Senior	Curry	27	25	23	48	18
Skylur Jameson	Freshman	Wentworth	27	19	29	48	6
Dennis Zak	Sophomore	Westfield State	24	20	27	47	30
Derek Hanson	Junior	Wisconsin–Stout	31	17	28	45	24
Nicholas Petriello	Sophomore	Buffalo State	25	16	29	45	74
Jeff Olitch	Junior	Wentworth	27	24	20	44	8
Michael Leone	Freshman	Adrian/Utica	27	14	30	44	4

=== Leading goaltenders ===
GP = Games played; Min = Minutes played; W = Wins; L = Losses; T = Ties; GA = Goals against; SO = Shutouts; SV% = Save percentage; GAA = Goals against average

Player	Class	Team	GP	Min	W	L	T	GA	SO	SV%	GAA
Johnathan LaRose	Sophomore	Amherst	13	778	12	1	0	18	3	.956	1.39
Cole Anderson	Sophomore	Amherst	15	915	10	4	1	23	1	.954	1.51
Brad Fogal	Sophomore	Adrian	27	1517	25	1	1	42	5	.928	1.66
Sergei Sorokolat	Sophomore	St. Scholastica	27	1626	18	7	2	50	6	.938	1.84
Steve Bounds	Senior	Massachusetts–Boston	16	965	8	6	2	34	1	.933	2.11
Bryan Hince	Sophomore	Plattsburgh State	19	570	10	4	3	19	0	.929	2.37
Blake Bashor	Sophomore	St. Norbert	18	964	10	6	1	31	2	.914	1.85
Chad Beiswenger	Senior	Wisconsin–Superior	30	1817	23	4	3	60	5	.919	1.98
Ryan Klingensmith	Junior	Norwich	23	1325	10	6	4	44	2	.917	1.99
Jacob Rinn	Freshman	Nichols	11	659	9	2	0	22	1	.924	2.00

== 2009 NCAA Tournament ==
First Round; March 11
E4	Elmira	1
E5	Neumann	2
E2	Amherst	4
E7	Babson	1
E3	Hobart	3
E6	Nichols	0

Quarterfinals; March 14
E1	Plattsburgh State	4
E5	Neumann	5*
E2	Amherst	1
E3	Hobart	2*
W1	Wisconsin–Superior	0
W4	Gustavus Adolphus	2
W2	Wisconsin–Stout	2
W3	St. Scholastica	1

Semifinals; March 20
E5	Neumann	2
E3	Hobart	0
W4	Gustavus Adolphus	3*
W2	Wisconsin–Stout	2

National Championship; March 21
E5	Neumann	4
W4	Gustavus Adolphus	1

Note: * denotes overtime period(s)

== See also ==
- 2008–09 NCAA Division I men's ice hockey season
