= Geneseo Knights =

Intercollegiate sports teams of State University of New York at Geneseo

- University: State University of New York at Geneseo
- NCAA: Division III
- Conference: Empire 8
- Athletic director: Dani Drews
- Location: Geneseo, New York
- Varsity teams: 19 (7 men's 12 women's)
- Basketball arena: Carl Schrader Gymnasium
- Ice hockey arena: Ira S. Wilson Ice Arena
- Softball stadium: Vic Raschi Softball Field
- Soccer stadium: College Stadium
- Aquatics center: Alumni Pool
- Lacrosse stadium: College Stadium
- Tennis venue: Geneseo Tennis Complex
- Outdoor track and field venue: Geneseo Track
- Volleyball arena: Carl Schrader Gymnasium
- Nickname: Knights
- Colors: Blue and Gray
- Mascot: Victor E. Knight
- Website: www.geneseoknights.com

The Geneseo Knights (also known as the SUNY Geneseo Knights or the Geneseo State Knights) are composed of 19 varsity teams (7 men's, 12 women's) representing the State University of New York at Geneseo (SUNY Geneseo) in intercollegiate athletics. All teams compete at the NCAA Division III level and all teams compete in the Empire 8 conference. In men's ice hockey the Geneseo Knights are known as the "Geneseo Ice Knights".

== Background ==
The Geneseo Knights has 19 varsity sports programs including basketball ((M)en's and (W)omen's), cross country (M, W), equestrian (W), field hockey (W), ice hockey (M), lacrosse (M, W), soccer (M, W), softball (W), swimming and diving (M, W), tennis (W), indoor/outdoor track & field (M, W), and volleyball (W).

== Sports Sponsored ==
| Men's sports | Women's sports |
|---|---|
| Basketball | Basketball |
| Cross country | Cross country |
| Ice hockey | Equestrian |
| Lacrosse | Field hockey |
| Soccer | Golf |
| Swimming and diving | Lacrosse |
| Track and field^{1} | Softball |
| | Soccer |
| | Swimming and diving |
| | Tennis |
| | Track and field^{1} |
| | Volleyball |
^{1} – Track and field includes both indoor and outdoor.

== National championships ==
=== Team ===
| Sport | Association | Division | Year | Opponent/Runner-up | Score |
|---|---|---|---|---|---|
| Women's cross country (1) | NCAA | Division III | 2005 | Williams | 88–107 |

== Club sports ==
Although they are not NCAA programs, Geneseo also has 23 competitive club sports teams that compete in intercollegiate play as well as teams for recreational participants. Some of these clubs include rowing, rugby, baseball, soccer, tennis, cheerleading, badminton and golf.

=== Intramural sports ===
There are also 27 intramural sport offerings, such as broomball.

== Venues ==
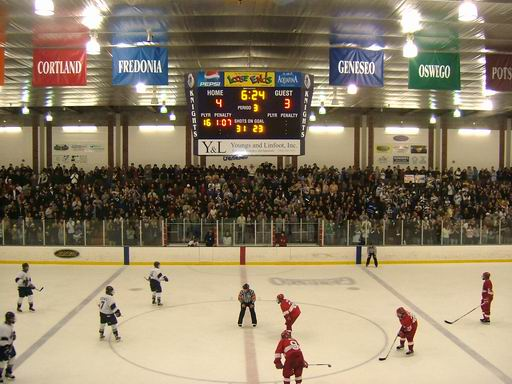
Ira Wilson Arena

The "Ira S. Wilson Ice Arena" (also known as 'The Ira') is an ice hockey rink located on the campus of SUNY Geneseo. It is the home ice of the SUNY Geneseo's NCAA Division III men's ice hockey team. It is also used by the Geneseo/Livingston Blues Youth Hockey, as well as students who take advantage of open skating hours during the week.

The arena has a listed capacity of 2,500 fans, and important Ice Knights hockey games routinely draw 2,000 fans from the college and the town.
