= NCAA Division III men's ice hockey tournament =

American college sports championship

- Classification: Division III
- Sport: College ice hockey
- Founded: 1984
- Country: United States
- Most recent champion: Hamilton College (1st title)
- Most titles: Middlebury (8)
- Website: NCAA.com

The NCAA Division III men's ice hockey tournament is an annual tournament to determine the top men's ice hockey team in NCAA Division III. The Division III championship was contested from 1984 through 2019, but then suspended due to COVID-19. The tournament resumed in the spring of 2022. The most successful team has been the Middlebury Panthers with eight titles.

== Champions ==
Year	Winning team	Coach	Losing team	Coach	Score	Location	Finals venue
1984	Babson	Rob Riley	Union	Charles Morrison	8–0	Rochester, New York	Frank Ritter Memorial Ice Arena
1985	RIT	Bruce Delventhal	Bemidji State	Bob Peters	5–1	Schenectady, New York	Achilles Rink
1986	Bemidji State	Bob Peters	Plattsburgh State (vacated)	Steve Hoar	8–5	Bemidji, Minnesota	John S. Glas Field House
1987	Plattsburgh State (vacated)	Steve Hoar	Oswego State	Don Unger	8–3	Elmira, New York	Murray Athletic Center
1988	Wisconsin–River Falls	Rick Kozuback	Elmira	Glenn Thomaris	7–1, 3–5, 3–0	Elmira, New York	Murray Athletic Center
1989	Wisconsin–Stevens Point	Mark Mazzoleni	RIT	Buddy Powers	3–3, 3–2	Rochester, New York	Frank Ritter Memorial Ice Arena
1990	Wisconsin–Stevens Point (2)	Mark Mazzoleni	Plattsburgh State	Bob Emery	10–1, 3–6, 1–0	Stevens Point, Wisconsin	K.B. Willett Arena
1991	Wisconsin–Stevens Point (3)	Mark Mazzoleni	Mankato State	Don Brose	6–2	Elmira, New York	Murray Athletic Center
1992	Plattsburgh State	Bob Emery	Wisconsin–Stevens Point	Joe Baldarotta	7–3	Plattsburgh, New York	Ronald B. Stafford Ice Arena
1993	Wisconsin–Stevens Point (4)	Joe Baldarotta	Wisconsin–River Falls	Dean Talafous	4–3 (OT)	Maplewood, Minnesota	Aldrich Arena
1994	Wisconsin–River Falls (2)	Dean Talafous	Wisconsin–Superior	Steve Nelson	6–4	Superior, Wisconsin	Wessman Arena
1995	Middlebury	Bill Beaney	Fredonia State	Jeff Meredith	1–0	Middlebury, Vermont	Nelson Recreation Center
1996	Middlebury (2)	Bill Beaney	RIT	Eric Hoffberg	3–2	River Falls, Wisconsin	W.H. Hunt Arena
1997	Middlebury (3)	Bill Beaney	Wisconsin–Superior	Steve Nelson	3–2	Middlebury, Vermont	Nelson Recreation Center
1998	Middlebury (4)	Bill Beaney	Wisconsin–Stevens Point	Joe Baldarotta	2–1	Plattsburgh, New York	Ronald B. Stafford Ice Arena
1999	Middlebury (5)	Bill Beaney	Wisconsin–Superior	Steve Nelson	5–0	Northfield, Vermont	Kreitzberg Arena
2000	Norwich	Mike McShane	St. Thomas	Terry Skrypek	2–1	Superior, Wisconsin	Wessman Arena
2001	Plattsburgh State (2)	Bob Emery	RIT	Wayne Wilson	6–2	Rochester, New York	Frank Ritter Memorial Ice Arena
2002	Wisconsin–Superior	Dan Stauber	Norwich	Mike McShane	3–2 (OT)	Middlebury, Vermont	Kenyon Arena
2003	Norwich (2)	Mike McShane	Oswego State	George Roll	2–1	Northfield, Vermont	Kreitzberg Arena
2004	Middlebury (6)	Bill Beaney	St. Norbert	Tim Coghlin	1–0 (OT)	Northfield, Vermont	Kreitzberg Arena
2005	Middlebury (7)	Bill Beaney	St. Thomas	Terry Skrypek	5–0	Middlebury, Vermont	Kenyon Arena
2006	Middlebury (8)	Bill Beaney	St. Norbert	Tim Coghlin	3–0	Elmira, New York	Murray Athletic Center
2007	Oswego State	Ed Gosek	Middlebury	Bill Beaney	4–3 (OT)	Superior, Wisconsin	Wessman Arena
2008	St. Norbert	Tim Coghlin	Plattsburgh State	Bob Emery	4–1	Lake Placid, New York	Herb Brooks Arena
2009	Neumann	Dominick Dawes	Gustavus Adolphus	Brett Petersen	4–1	Lake Placid, New York	Herb Brooks Arena
2010	Norwich (3)	Mike McShane	St. Norbert	Tim Coghlin	2–1 (2OT)	Lake Placid, New York	Herb Brooks Arena
2011	St. Norbert (2)	Tim Coghlin	Adrian	Ron Fogarty	4–3	Minneapolis, Minnesota	Ridder Arena
2012	St. Norbert (3)	Tim Coghlin	Oswego State	Ed Gosek	4–1	Lake Placid, New York	Herb Brooks Arena
2013	Wisconsin–Eau Claire	Matt Loen	Oswego State	Ed Gosek	5–3	Lake Placid, New York	Herb Brooks Arena
2014	St. Norbert (4)	Tim Coghlin	Wisconsin–Stevens Point	Chris Brooks	3–1	Lewiston, Maine	Androscoggin Bank Colisée
2015	Trinity	Matthew Greason	Wisconsin–Stevens Point	Chris Brooks	5–2	Minneapolis, Minnesota	Ridder Arena
2016	Wisconsin–Stevens Point (5)	Chris Brooks	St. Norbert	Tim Coghlin	5–1	Lake Placid, New York	Herb Brooks Arena
2017	Norwich (4)	Mike McShane	Trinity	Matthew Greason	4–1	Utica, New York	Utica Memorial Auditorium
2018	St. Norbert (5)	Tim Coghlin	Salve Regina	Zech Klann	3–2 (2OT)	Lake Placid, New York	Herb Brooks Arena
2019	Wisconsin–Stevens Point (6)	Tyler Krueger	Norwich	Cam Ellsworth	3–2 (OT)	Stevens Point, Wisconsin	K.B. Willett Arena
2020	Canceled due to COVID-19					Buffalo, New York	LECOM Harborcenter
2021	Canceled due to COVID-19					NONE †	
2022	Adrian	Adam Krug	Geneseo State	Chris Schultz	5–2	Lake Placid, New York	Herb Brooks Arena
2023	Hobart	Mark Taylor	Adrian	Adam Krug	3–2 (OT)	Beverly, Massachusetts	Raymond J. Bourque Arena
2024	Hobart (2)	Mark Taylor	Trinity	Matthew Greason	2–0	Hartford, Connecticut	Koeppel Community Center
2025	Hobart (3)	Mark Taylor	Utica	Gary Heenan	2–1 (OT)	Utica, New York	Utica Memorial Auditorium
2026	Hamilton	Rob Haberbusch	Hobart	Mark Taylor	2–1 (OT)	Utica, New York	Utica Memorial Auditorium

Note: from 1988 through 1990 the championship round was a 2-game series where the first team to three points won (2 points for a win, 1 point for a tie). If the two teams remained tied after 2 games a 20-minute mini-game was held to determine the winner. Mini-game results are in italics.
† Due to the COVID-19 pandemic, the NCAA did not hold any division III tournament during the 2020–21 season.

== Team titles ==
Team	Number	Years Won
Middlebury	8	1995, 1996, 1997, 1998, 1999, 2004, 2005, 2006
Wisconsin–Stevens Point	6	1989, 1990, 1991, 1993, 2016, 2019
St. Norbert	5	2008, 2011, 2012, 2014, 2018
Norwich	4	2000, 2003, 2010, 2017
Hobart	3	2023, 2024, 2025
Plattsburgh State	2	1992, 2001
Wisconsin–River Falls	2	1988, 1994
Adrian	1	2022
Babson	1	1984
Bemidji State	1	1986
Hamilton	1	2026
Neumann	1	2009
Oswego State	1	2007
RIT	1	1985
Trinity	1	2015
Wisconsin–Eau Claire	1	2013
Wisconsin–Superior	1	2002

== Host cities ==
City	Number	Years Hosted
Lake Placid, New York	8	2008, 2009, 2010, 2012, 2013, 2016, 2018, 2022
Elmira, New York	4	1987, 1988, 1991, 2006
Middlebury, Vermont	4	1995, 1997, 2002, 2005
Northfield, Vermont	3	1999, 2003, 2004
Rochester, New York	3	1984, 1989, 2001
Superior, Wisconsin	3	1994, 2000, 2007
Utica, New York	3	2017, 2025, 2026
Minneapolis, Minnesota	2	2011, 2015
Plattsburgh, New York	2	1992, 1998
Stevens Point, Wisconsin	2	1990, 2019
Bemidji, Minnesota	1	1986
Beverly, Massachusetts	1	2023
Buffalo, New York	1	2020
Hartford, Connecticut	1	2024
Lewiston, Maine	1	2014
Maplewood, Minnesota	1	1993
River Falls, Wisconsin	1	1996
Schenectady, New York	1	1985

== Performance by team ==
The code in each cell represents the furthest the team made it in the respective tournament:

- – Not fielding a division III team
- FR First round (2 teams starting in 2002, 4 teams starting in 2006, 6 teams starting in 2009, 8 teams starting in 2017, 10 teams in 2024, 12 teams in 2025)
- QF Quarterfinals
- F4 Frozen Four
- RU National Runner-up
- CH National Champion
- ~~RU~~ The team achieved the placement shown, but the participation was later vacated. These vacated appearances are not included in the total columns.

Note: The field for the 2020 tournament was announced shortly before its cancellation.

Beginning in 2002, teams that received byes into the quarterfinal round are underlined.

School	Conference as of 2026	#	QF	F4	CG	CH	84	85	86	87	88	89	90	91	92	93	94	95	96	97	98	99	00	01	02	03	04	05	06	07	08	09	10	11	12	13	14	15	16	17	18	19	20	22	23	24	25	26
Middlebury	NESCAC	14	14	11	9	8												CH	CH	CH	CH	CH	QF	QF	F4	F4	CH	CH	CH	RU			QF															
Wisconsin–Stevens Point	WIAC	17	16	11	10	6					QF	CH	CH	CH	RU	CH	QF	QF			RU																RU	RU	CH	QF	F4	CH			QF	FR		
St. Norbert	NCHA	23	23	12	9	5	–	–	–	–	–									QF	QF	QF			QF	F4	RU	QF	RU	F4	CH		RU	CH	CH	QF	CH		RU	F4	CH	QF		QF		QF	QF	QF
Norwich	LEC	21	21	13	6	4				QF										F4		F4	CH		RU	CH	F4		QF	QF	F4		CH	F4	F4	F4	QF	QF		CH		RU	QF		QF			QF
Hobart	SUNYAC	15	11	7	4	3																					QF		F4		QF	F4						FR	QF	FR	FR	F4	FR	QF	CH	CH	CH	RU
Plattsburgh State	SUNYAC	20	18	11	4	2		F4	~~RU~~	~~CH~~	~~QF~~		RU		CH	F4		QF		QF	F4	QF	F4	CH	F4		F4				RU	QF	F4	QF	QF			QF		FR					FR			
Wisconsin–River Falls	WIAC	11	10	6	3	2	QF				CH					RU	CH	F4	F4		QF			F4		QF	QF			FR																		
Oswego State	SUNYAC	17	15	8	5	1	QF			RU	QF	QF		QF							QF					RU				CH			F4	F4	RU	RU	F4	QF		FR		QF					FR	
Wisconsin–Superior	WIAC	13	12	9	4	1									F4	QF	RU	F4	F4	RU		RU	F4	F4	CH				QF			QF		FR														
RIT	AHA	12	12	7	4	1	F4	CH	F4			RU					QF		RU	QF	QF	F4	QF	RU	QF				–	–	–	–	–	–	–	–	–	–	–	–	–	–	–	–	–	–	–	–
Adrian	NCHA	12	10	6	3	1	–	–	–	–	–	–	–	–	–	–	–	–	–	–	–	–	–	–	–	–	–	–	–	–			FR	RU		QF	QF	F4	QF	F4	QF		FR	CH	RU	F4		
Trinity	NESCAC	9	6	4	3	1																				QF		F4			QF							CH	FR	RU		FR		FR		RU		
Bemidji State	CCHA	5	5	5	2	1	–	RU	CH	F4	F4	F4				–	–	–	–	–	–	–	–	–	–	–	–	–	–	–	–	–	–	–	–	–	–	–	–	–	–	–	–	–	–	–	–	–
Babson	LEC	16	14	5	1	1	CH	QF	QF	QF	F4	F4	F4	F4	QF	QF														QF		FR				QF	QF						FR	QF				
Wisconsin–Eau Claire	WIAC	4	3	1	1	1						QF																								CH							QF				FR	
Hamilton	NESCAC	3	3	1	1	1																																		QF							QF	CH
Neumann	MAC	3	1	1	1	1	–	–	–	–	–	–	–	–	–	–	–	–	–	–	–											CH		FR														FR
St. Thomas	CCHA	17	12	2	2	0	QF	QF	QF		QF		QF		QF		QF					QF	RU		FR		FR	RU			QF		FR		FR		QF						FR	–	–	–	–	–
Elmira	UCHC	17	15	5	1	0			QF		RU		QF	F4	QF	F4	QF			QF						QF			F4		F4	FR	QF	QF	QF									FR		QF		
Geneseo State	UCHC	11	9	5	1	0							QF															QF	FR								F4		F4		QF	F4	QF	RU		FR	F4	
Utica	UCHC	7	7	3	1	0	–	–	–	–	–	–	–	–	–	–	–	–	–	–	–	–	–	–												F4							QF	QF	QF	F4	RU	QF
Minnesota State	CCHA	5	5	3	1	0		QF	F4				F4	RU	QF	–	–	–	–	–	–	–	–	–	–	–	–	–	–	–	–	–	–	–	–	–	–	–	–	–	–	–	–	–	–	–	–	–
Union	ECAC Hockey	4	4	2	1	0	RU	F4	QF			QF			–	–	–	–	–	–	–	–	–	–	–	–	–	–	–	–	–	–	–	–	–	–	–	–	–	–	–	–	–	–	–	–	–	–
Fredonia State	SUNYAC	3	2	2	1	0	–	–	–	–							F4	RU												FR																		
Gustavus Adolphus	MIAC	7	6	1	1	0							QF	QF		QF																RU	QF		QF												FR	
Salve Regina	Independent	3	1	1	1	0	–	–	–	–	–	–	–	–	–	–	–	–	–	–																			FR		RU							FR
Augsburg	MIAC	8	6	3	0	0	F4														F4																		QF	QF	QF	FR		F4	FR			
Salem State	MASCAC	9	6	2	0	0		QF		QF					F4	QF	F4	QF																			FR		FR	FR								
Amherst	NESCAC	4	4	2	0	0																QF										QF			F4			F4										
New England	CNE	6	3	2	0	0	–	–	–	–	–	–	–	–	–	–	–	–	–	–	–	–	–	–	–	–	–	–	–	–	–	–									FR	QF		F4	F4		FR	FR
Wisconsin–Stout	WIAC	3	2	2	0	0																									FR	F4																F4
Curry	CNE	7	5	1	0	0																					QF	QF					FR	FR											QF	QF	F4	
Manhattanville	UCHC	5	5	1	0	0	–	–	–	–	–	–	–	–	–	–	–	–	–	–	–	–						QF	QF	F4	QF											QF						
Saint John's	MIAC	7	3	1	0	0													QF	F4				QF		FR		FR								FR												FR
Endicott	CNE	5	3	1	0	0	–	–	–	–	–	–	–	–	–	–	–	–	–	–	–	–	–	–	–	–	–	–	–	–	–	–	–	–	–	–	–	–		QF			FR		F4	FR		QF
New England College	LEC	3	3	1	0	0	QF																	QF				F4																				
Colby	NESCAC	2	2	1	0	0													QF																						F4							
Aurora	NCHA	2	2	1	0	0	–	–	–	–	–	–	–	–	–	–	–	–	–	–	–	–	–	–	–	–	–	–	–	–	–	–	–	–	–	–	–										QF	F4
UMass Boston	LEC	2	1	1	0	0																																	F4			FR						
St. Cloud State	NCHC	1	1	1	0	0				F4	–	–	–	–	–	–	–	–	–	–	–	–	–	–	–	–	–	–	–	–	–	–	–	–	–	–	–	–	–	–	–	–	–	–	–	–	–	–
Bowdoin	NESCAC	7	5	0	0	0													QF						QF								QF	QF		QF	FR								FR			
Wentworth	CNE	6	5	0	0	0	–	–	–	–	–	–	–	–	–								QF		QF	QF	QF								QF	FR												
UMass Dartmouth	LEC	4	2	0	0	0																							QF	QF	FR					FR												
Saint Mary's	MIAC	2	2	0	0	0						QF						QF																														
Concordia (MN)	MIAC	2	2	0	0	0				QF													QF																									
Hamline	MIAC	2	2	0	0	0																												QF			QF											
Plymouth State	LEC	7	1	0	0	0																													FR			FR				FR	FR	FR	FR	QF		
Nichols	CNE	4	1	0	0	0																										FR					FR	FR			QF							
Lake Forest	NCHA	2	1	0	0	0								QF																													FR					
Williams	NESCAC	2	1	0	0	0																																	QF									FR
Mercyhurst	AHA	1	1	0	0	0	–	–	–	–				QF		–	–	–	–	–	–	–	–	–	–	–	–	–	–	–	–	–	–	–	–	–	–	–	–	–	–	–	–	–	–	–	–	–
Potsdam State	SUNYAC	1	1	0	0	0													QF																													
Lebanon Valley	MAC	1	1	0	0	0	–	–	–	–	–	–	–	–	–	–	–	–	–	–	–			QF										–	–	–	–	–	–									
Bethel	MIAC	1	1	0	0	0																								QF																		
St. Scholastica	MIAC	1	1	0	0	0																										QF																
Trine	NCHA	1	1	0	0	0	–	–	–	–	–	–	–	–	–	–	–	–	–	–	–	–	–	–	–	–	–	–	–	–	–	–	–	–	–	–	–	–	–	–							QF	
St. Olaf	MIAC	3	0	0	0	0																							FR															FR		FR		
Fitchburg State	MASCAC	2	0	0	0	0																																			FR						FR	
MSOE	NCHA	1	0	0	0	0	–	–	–	–	–	–	–	–	–	–	–	–	–	–	–	–	–	–											FR													
Marian	NCHA	1	0	0	0	0	–	–	–	–	–	–	–	–	–	–	–	–																							FR							
Wesleyan	NESCAC	1	0	0	0	0																																					FR					
Cortland State	SUNYAC	1	0	0	0	0																																								FR		
Stevenson	MAC	1	0	0	0	0	–	–	–	–	–	–	–	–	–	–	–	–	–	–	–	–	–	–	–	–	–	–	–	–	–	–	–	–	–	–	–	–	–								FR	
Anna Maria	MASCAC	1	0	0	0	0	–	–	–	–	–	–	–	–	–	–	–	–	–	–	–	–	–	–	–	–	–	–	–	–	–	–	–	–	–	–	–	–	–	–	–							FR

== No appearances ==
The following is a list of current Division III teams that have yet to make a tournament appearance.

School	Conference	First season
Albertus Magnus	UCHC	2020
Alvernia	MAC	2023
Arcadia	MAC	2022
Beloit	WIAC	2026
Brockport State	UCHC	1974 ^{†}
Buffalo State	SUNYAC	1994
Canton State	SUNYAC	2013
Castleton	LEC	2003
Chatham	UCHC	2018
Concordia (WI)	NCHA	2008
Connecticut College	NESCAC	1981 ^{†}
Dubuque	NCHA	2024
Framingham State	MASCAC	1971 ^{†}
Hiram	Independent	2026
Johnson & Wales	CNE	1997
King's	MAC	2018
Lawrence	NCHA	1987
MCLA	MASCAC	1972 ^{†}
Misericordia	MAC	2025
Morrisville State	SUNYAC	2007
Nazareth	UCHC	2013
Rivier	MASCAC	2022
Roger Williams	CNE	1983 ^{†}
Skidmore	SUNYAC	1983 ^{†}
Southern Maine	LEC	1972 ^{†}
St. John Fisher	UCHC	2026
Suffolk	CNE	1947 ^{‡}
Tufts	NESCAC	1908 ^{‡}
Western Connecticut	LEC	2026
Western New England	CNE	1981 ^{†}
Westfield State	MASCAC	1974 ^{†}
Wilkes	MAC	2019
Worcester State	MASCAC	1967 ^{†}

† Teams were eligible for either the Division II tournament (1978-1984) or the NAIA Tournament (1968-1984).
‡ From 1948 to 1965, teams were also eligible for the Division I tournament.
¿ Roger Williams was inactive from 1998 to 2025

== See also ==
- NCAA Division I Men's Ice Hockey Championship
- NCAA Division II Men's Ice Hockey Championship
- National Collegiate Women's Ice Hockey Championship
- NCAA Division III Women's Ice Hockey Championship
