= Joe Baldarotta =

American ice hockey coach

Biographical details
- Born: Madison, Wisconsin, U.S.
- Education: University of Wisconsin–Stevens Point

Playing career
- 1974–1976: Wisconsin–Stevens Point
- Position: Forward

Coaching career (HC unless noted)
- 1982–1986: Madison West
- 1986–1991: Wisconsin–Stevens Point (assistant)
- 1991–2007: Wisconsin–Stevens Point
- 2007–2013: Cortland State

Head coaching record
- Overall: 310–266–49 (.535)
- Tournaments: 7–7–0 (.500)

Accomplishments and honors

Championships
- 1992 NCHA champion 1992 NCHA tournament champion 1993 NCHA champion 1993 NCHA tournament champion 1993 National Champion; 2000 NCHA champion

Awards
- 1993 Edward Jeremiah Award

Joseph Baldarotta is an American retired ice hockey player and coach who was the NCAA Division III coach of the year.

== Career ==
Baldarotta played two seasons for Wisconsin–Stevens Point in the mid-70's, ending his playing days in 1976. After college, he returned to his high school alma mater, Madison West, as an assistant coach for the hockey team and later became head coach. He returned to Stevens Point as an assistant in 1986 and helped head coach Mark Mazzoleni turn the pointers into a national powerhouse. WSP won three consecutive national titles and after the last, in 1991, Mazzoleni accepted an offer to coach at the Division I level. Baldarotta was promoted to head coach and kept the Pointers in good standing for several years. In his second year leading the program, Wisconsin–Stevens Point won its fourth national title and he received the Edward Jeremiah Award as the national Division III coach of the year.

After a decline in the mid-90s Baldarotta was able to bring the team back to prominence in 1998 and reached the championship game. Afterwards, however, the Pointers slowly sank down the NCHA standings. While Baldarotta was able to keep the team's head above water, Stevens Point never made another national appearance under his stewardship. He remained with the program until posting his worst season in 2007. After just his second losing season in 16 years, Baldarotta resigned as head coach.

Before the next season began, however, Baldarotta was back behind the bench, this time for Cortland State. The Red Dragons were hoping to rise out of the doldrums under Baldarotta and the results looked promising in his first year. Cortland posted its best record in 6 years and fell one win shy of reaching .500. Unfortunately, the next five years saw disappointing records and the Red Dragons finished at or near the bottom of the SUNYAC standings each season. In 2013, Baldarotta retired as a coach and turned the team over to the team's former coach, Tom Cranfield.

Baldarotta was inducted into the Wisconsin Hockey Hall of Fame in 2015.

== Statistics ==
=== Regular season and playoffs ===
			Regular Season					Playoffs
Season	Team	League	GP	G	A	Pts	PIM	GP	G	A	Pts	PIM
1974–75	Wisconsin–Stevens Point	NAIA	—	—	—	—	—	—	—	—	—	—
1975–76	Wisconsin–Stevens Point	NAIA	—	—	—	—	—	—	—	—	—	—
NAIA totals			—	—	—	—	—	—	—	—	—	—

== Head coaching record ==
Record table
Season	Team	Overall	Conference	Standing	Postseason
Wisconsin–Stevens Point Pointers (NCHA) (1991–2007)
1991–92	Wisconsin–Stevens Point	25–7–4	14–4–2	1st	NCAA runner-up
1992–93	Wisconsin–Stevens Point	25–5–2	17–1–2	1st	NCAA Champion
1993–94	Wisconsin–Stevens Point	17–9–3	13–6–1	2nd	NCAA Quarterfinals
1994–95	Wisconsin–Stevens Point	13–13–7	10–5–5	3rd	NCHA runner-up
1995–96	Wisconsin–Stevens Point	11–14–2	7–12–1	T–5th	NCHA Quarterfinals
1996–97	Wisconsin–Stevens Point	17–8–2	14–5–1	T–2nd	NCHA Semifinals
1997–98	Wisconsin–Stevens Point	23–11–0	14–6–0	T–3rd	NCAA runner-up
1998–99	Wisconsin–Stevens Point	17–11–1	10–6–0	T–3rd	NCHA Semifinals
1999–00	Wisconsin–Stevens Point	23–7–1	12–2–0	1st	NCHA runner-up
2000–01	Wisconsin–Stevens Point	17–12–0	7–7–0	5th	NCHA Semifinals
2001–02	Wisconsin–Stevens Point	18–9–2	8–4–2	3rd	NCHA Semifinals
2002–03	Wisconsin–Stevens Point	15–12–2	8–6–0	4th	NCHA third-place game (win)
2003–04	Wisconsin–Stevens Point	13–12–3	5–7–2	T–5th	NCHA Semifinals
2004–05	Wisconsin–Stevens Point	12–12–3	7–6–1	4th	NCHA Quarterfinals
2005–06	Wisconsin–Stevens Point	12–11–4	6–6–2	T–4th	NCHA Quarterfinals
2006–07	Wisconsin–Stevens Point	7–18–2	3–10–1	T–6th	NCHA Quarterfinals
Wisconsin–Stevens Point:		265–171–38	155–93–20		
Cortland State Red Dragons (SUNYAC) (2007–2013)
2007–08	Cortland State	11–12–3	6–8–2	T–5th	SUNYAC Quarterfinals
2008–09	Cortland State	8–15–2	5–9–2	T–7th	
2009–10	Cortland State	7–18–0	4–12–0	8th	
2010–11	Cortland State	6–17–2	5–10–1	7th	
2011–12	Cortland State	6–18–1	4–11–1	T–8th	
2012–13	Cortland State	7–15–3	3–11–2	T–8th	
Cortland State:		45–95–11	27–61–8		
Total:		310–266–49			
National champion Postseason invitational champion Conference regular season champion Conference regular season and conference tournament champion Division regular season champion Division regular season and conference tournament champion Conference tournament champion

Awards and achievements
Preceded by Bruce Marshall	Edward Jeremiah Award; 1992–93	Succeeded by Jeff Meredith
