= Bob Emery (ice hockey) =

American ice hockey player and coach

Current position
- Title: Director of Hockey Operations
- Team: Merrimack

Biographical details
- Born: March 4, 1964 (age 62); Somerville, Massachusetts, U.S.

Playing career
- 1983–1986: Boston College

Coaching career (HC unless noted)
- 1989–2019: SUNY Plattsburgh

Head coaching record
- Overall: 624–215–65 (.726)

Accomplishments and honors

Championships
- 1992 NCAA Championship; 2001 NCAA Championship

Robert Donald Emery (born March 4, 1964) was a college men's ice hockey coach at the State University of New York at Plattsburgh. He played college hockey at Boston College from 1983 to 1986 and briefly played professional hockey with the Fredericton Express in New Brunswick and the Maine Mariners in Portland, Maine. He has been the head men's ice hockey coach at Plattsburgh State since the 1989-1990 season. With 465 career victories, he is the winningest hockey coach in Plattsburgh history and the 20th winningest coach in NCAA college history. His .742 career winning percentage ranks third all-time among college coaches with at least 300 wins.

== Personal life ==
Born March 4, 1964 to parents Dave and Marie Emery. Emery grew up in Somerville, Massachusetts, and played his hockey for Matignon High School.

== Early years ==
A native of Somerville, Massachusetts, Emery played hockey for Matignon High School from 1979 to 1982 and led the team to three consecutive state championships in 1979, 1980 and 1981. Emery was named to the Massachusetts High School All-Scholastic First Team in 1981-1982.

== Boston College ==
Emery enrolled at Boston College in 1982. He participated in three NCAA Division I men's ice hockey tournaments while attending Boston College. He was selected as a Hockey East All-Star as a senior in the 1985-1986 season.

Emery received a bachelor's degree in marketing from Boston College in 1986. He also earned a master's degree in leadership at Plattsburgh State in 1990.

== Professional hockey ==
In 1982, Emery was drafted by the Montreal Canadiens in the 10th round (208th overall pick) of the NHL Entry Draft. He was invited to the Canadiens' training camp and later played for the Fredericton Express, the Quebec Nordiques affiliate in the American Hockey League. He also played with the Maine Mariners.

== Plattsburgh State ==
In 1988, Emery became an assistant men's hockey coach at Plattsburgh State while studying for his master's degree. After one season as an assistant, he was promoted to head coach for the 1989-1990 hockey season. Emery led Plattsburgh to the NCAA Tournament in 18 of the next 30 seasons. His teams have won two national championships and advanced to the Frozen Four nine times in 1990, 1992, 1998, 2000, 2001, 2002, 2004, 2008 and 2010. His best record came in 1992 when Emery led Plattsburgh to a 32-2-2 record and its first NCAA national championship. Emery's second national championship came in 2001 and resulted from beating the previously undefeated RIT Tigers in the finals. Emery announced his retirement from coaching at the end of the 2018–19 season and was 11th all-time in wins with 624 when he hung up his whistle.

== Merrimack ==
Shortly after wrapping up his coaching career, Emery was hired by Merrimack to be the Director of Hockey operations.

== Career statistics ==
=== Regular season and playoffs ===
			Regular season					Playoffs
Season	Team	League	GP	G	A	Pts	PIM	GP	G	A	Pts	PIM
1982–83	Boston College Eagles	ECAC	21	0	2	2	18	—	—	—	—	—
1983–84	Boston College Eagles	ECAC	35	2	7	9	32	—	—	—	—	—
1984–85	Boston College Eagles	HE	42	3	11	14	54	—	—	—	—	—
1985–86	Boston College Eagles	HE	39	2	15	17	48	—	—	—	—	—
1986–87	Fredericton Express	AHL	42	2	0	2	63	—	—	—	—	—
1987–88	Maine Mariners	AHL	6	0	0	0	4	—	—	—	—	—
NCAA totals			137	7	35	42	152	—	—	—	—	—
AHL totals			48	2	0	2	67	—	—	—	—	—

== Head coaching record ==
Record table
Season	Team	Overall	Conference	Standing	Postseason
Plattsburgh State Cardinals (ECAC West) (1989–1992)
1989–90	Plattsburgh State	22–10–3	17–8–1	6th	NCAA runner-up
1990–91	Plattsburgh State	19–7–1	18–7–0	5th	Ineligible
1991–92	Plattsburgh State	32–2–2	24–1–2	1st	NCAA Champion
Plattsburgh State:		73–19–6	59–16–3		
Plattsburgh State Cardinals (SUNYAC) (1992–2019)
1992–93	Plattsburgh State	25–6–2	11–0–1	1st	NCAA third-place game (loss)
1993–94	Plattsburgh State	18–9–2	9–2–1	2nd	SUNYAC Runner-Up
1994–95	Plattsburgh State	20–9–2	12–2–0	T–1st	NCAA Quarterfinals
1995–96	Plattsburgh State	20–6–3	13–1–0	1st	SUNYAC Runner-Up
1996–97	Plattsburgh State	22–6–3	10–3–1	2nd	NCAA Quarterfinals
1997–98	Plattsburgh State	26–8–1	9–4–1	3rd	NCAA third-place game (win)
1998–99	Plattsburgh State	23–5–3	13–0–1	1st	NCAA Quarterfinals
1999–00	Plattsburgh State	26–4–3	13–0–1	1st	NCAA third-place game (win)
2000–01	Plattsburgh State	29–5–0	13–1–0	1st	NCAA Champion
2001–02	Plattsburgh State	20–9–4	13–1–0	1st	NCAA Frozen Four
2002–03	Plattsburgh State	20–9–3	9–4–1	3rd	SUNYAC Runner-Up
2003–04	Plattsburgh State	23–5–3	12–0–2	1st	NCAA Frozen Four
2004–05	Plattsburgh State	18–13–0	7–7–0	4th	SUNYAC Runner-Up
2005–06	Plattsburgh State	19–12–1	8–6–0	T–4th	SUNYAC Runner-Up
2006–07	Plattsburgh State	14–8–6	6–4–4	3rd	SUNYAC Runner-Up
2007–08	Plattsburgh State	25–5–0	14–2–0	1st	NCAA runner-up
2008–09	Plattsburgh State	24–2–2	15–0–1	1st	NCAA Quarterfinals
2009–10	Plattsburgh State	19–6–4	13–2–1	2nd	NCAA Frozen Four
2010–11	Plattsburgh State	20–8–1	9–7–0	4th	NCAA Quarterfinals
2011–12	Plattsburgh State	19–5–4	12–3–1	2nd	NCAA Quarterfinals
2012–13	Plattsburgh State	19–7–1	13–2–1	2nd	SUNYAC Runner-Up
2013–14	Plattsburgh State	19–5–2	12–2–2	2nd	SUNYAC Semifinals
2014–15	Plattsburgh State	20–6–2	13–2–1	1st	NCAA Quarterfinals
2015–16	Plattsburgh State	20–4–3	12–1–3	1st	SUNYAC Runner-Up
2016–17	Plattsburgh State	17–10–1	10–5–1	2nd	NCAA first round
2017–18	Plattsburgh State	13–12–1	7–8–1	T–4th	SUNYAC Quarterfinals
2018–19	Plattsburgh State	13–12–2	10–5–1	3rd	SUNYAC Semifinals
Plattsburgh State:		551–196–59	298–74–26		
Total:		624–215–65			
National champion Postseason invitational champion Conference regular season champion Conference regular season and conference tournament champion Division regular season champion Division regular season and conference tournament champion Conference tournament champion

== Awards and honors ==
Award	Year
All-Hockey East Second Team	1985–86

== See also ==
- List of college men's ice hockey coaches with 400 wins
