= Tim Coghlin =

Canadian ice hockey player and coach

Current position
- Title: Head coach
- Team: St. Norbert
- Conference: NCHA
- Record: 696–184–62 (.772)

Biographical details
- Born: March 24, 1964 (age 62); Summerland, British Columbia, Canada
- Education: University of Wisconsin–Stevens Point

Playing career
- 1985–1989: Wisconsin–Stevens Point
- 1990–1991: Fife Flyers
- Position: Defenseman

Coaching career (HC unless noted)
- 1991–1993: Wisconsin–Stevens Point (assistant)
- 1993–present: St. Norbert

Head coaching record
- Overall: 696–184–62 (.772)

Accomplishments and honors

Championships
- NCHA Regular Season Champion (16): 1997, 1998, 1999, 2002, 2003, 2004, 2005, 2006, 2007, 2008, 2010, 2011, 2012, 2014, 2016, 2019 NCHA North Division Champion (5): 2016, 2017, 2018, 2019, 2020 NCHA Tournament Champion (15): 1998, 1999, 2003, 2004, 2005, 2007, 2008, 2010, 2011, 2012, 2013, 2014, 2017, 2018, 2019 NCAA Division III National Champion (7): 1989 (player), 1993 (assistant), 2008, 2011, 2012, 2014, 2018

Awards
- 2008 Edward Jeremiah Award; 2011 Edward Jeremiah Award

Tim Coghlin (born March 24, 1964) is a college men's ice hockey coach. He has been the men's ice hockey head coach at St. Norbert College since 1994.

== Hockey player ==
Coghlin grew up in western Canada and enrolled at the University of Wisconsin–Stevens Point. He was the captain of the 1989 Stevens Point team that won the NCAA Division III national championship for the first time in school history. He was twice selected as an All-American defenseman.

Coghlin signed with the Vancouver Canucks in October 1989, and was assigned to the Milwaukee Admirals for the remainder of the year, though he didn't appear in any games. He injured his shoulder in training camp the following fall and ended up missing the entire season. In 1990, he played for the Fife Flyers as a player and assistant coach.

== Hockey coach ==
Coghlin returned to Stevens Point in 1991 as an assistant hockey coach. He was part of the coaching staff on the Stevens Point teams that won the national title in 1993 and finished as the runner-up in 1992. After the '93 championship, he was named head coach for the 5-year-old program at St. Norbert College in De Pere, Wisconsin, and has been there ever since (as of 2024). Coghlin recalled the lack of talent when he arrived at St. Norbert, "When I came to St. Norbert, they weren't actively recruiting the same type of hockey players that other schools in the state were. We went immediately into western Canada and brought some kids in." Despite coaching at a private Catholic institution serving 2,100 students, Coghlin had success attracting quality players from Canada and Europe.

Coghlin led the St. Norbert Green Knights to their first national championship in 2008, winning both Frozen Four games by shutouts. St. Norbert finished the 2008 season with a record of 27–1–4, the fewest losses ever for an NCAA Division III men's ice hockey champion at the time. Coghlin was named NCAA Division III Coach of the Year in 2008. Coghlin also led his team to the Frozen Four in 2003, 2004, 2006, 2007, 2008 and 2010. When St Norbert suspended operations for the 2020–21 season due to the COVID-19 pandemic, he was just 4 victories shy of 600 for his career and possessed the best winning percentage of any coach with at least 400 wins.

== Statistics ==
=== Regular season and playoffs ===
| | | | Regular Season | | | | | Playoffs |
| Season | Team | League | GP | G | A | Pts | PIM | GP | G | A | Pts | PIM |
|---|---|---|---|---|---|---|---|---|---|---|---|---|
| 1982–83 | Shuswap Totems | BCJHL | 54 | 23 | 52 | 75 | 108 | — | — | — | — | — |
| 1983–84 | Shuswap Totems | BCJHL | 52 | 21 | 45 | 66 | 124 | — | — | — | — | — |
| 1984–85 | Salmon Arm Totems | BCJHL | 22 | 9 | 18 | 27 | 35 | — | — | — | — | — |
| 1985–86 | Wisconsin–Stevens Point | NCHA | 24 | 6 | 13 | 19 | 22 | — | — | — | — | — |
| 1986–87 | Wisconsin–Stevens Point | NCHA | 21 | 3 | 24 | 27 | 59 | — | — | — | — | — |
| 1987–88 | Wisconsin–Stevens Point | NCHA | 30 | 4 | 25 | 29 | 68 | — | — | — | — | — |
| 1988–89 | Wisconsin–Stevens Point | NCHA | 30 | 8 | 25 | 33 | 64 | — | — | — | — | — |
| 1990–91 | Fife Flyers | BHL | 17 | 4 | 11 | 15 | 34 | — | — | — | — | — |
| BCJHL totals | | | 128 | 53 | 115 | 168 | 267 | — | — | — | — | — |
| NCAA totals | | | 105 | 21 | 87 | 108 | 213 | — | — | — | — | — |

== Head coaching record ==
Record table
| Season | Team | Overall | Conference | Standing | Postseason |
|---|---|---|---|---|---|
St. Norbert Green Knights Independent (1993–1994)
| 1993–94 | St. Norbert | 10–9–1 | | | |
| St. Norbert: | | 10–9–1 | | | |
St. Norbert Green Knights (NCHA) (1994–present)
| 1994–95 | St. Norbert | 10–14–3 | 6–12–2 | 6th | NCHA Quarterfinal |
| 1995–96 | St. Norbert | 12–13–2 | 9–9–2 | 4th | NCHA Semifinal |
| 1996–97 | St. Norbert | 21–9–1 | 16–4–0 | 1st | NCHA Semifinal |
| 1997–98 | St. Norbert | 27–6–0 | 17–3–0 | 1st | NCAA Quarterfinals |
| 1998–99 | St. Norbert | 25–5–3 | 12–2–2 | 1st | NCAA Quarterfinals |
| 1999–00 | St. Norbert | 22–5–2 | 10–3–1 | 2nd | NCHA Semifinal |
| 2000–01 | St. Norbert | 18–8–3 | 9–4–1 | 3rd | NCHA Semifinal |
| 2001–02 | St. Norbert | 23–5–3 | 12–0–2 | 1st | NCAA Quarterfinals |
| 2002–03 | St. Norbert | 27–2–2 | 12–1–1 | 1st | NCAA Frozen Four |
| 2003–04 | St. Norbert | 27–3–2 | 11–2–1 | 1st | NCAA Runner-Up |
| 2004–05 | St. Norbert | 24–4–3 | 12–0–2 | 1st | NCAA Quarterfinals |
| 2005–06 | St. Norbert | 25–5–2 | 10–2–2 | 1st | NCAA Runner-Up |
| 2006–07 | St. Norbert | 25–4–2 | 10–3–1 | T–1st | NCAA Semifinals |
| 2007–08 | St. Norbert | 27–1–4 | 10–0–4 | 1st | NCAA Champion |
| 2008–09 | St. Norbert | 19–8–1 | 8–5–1 | 4th | NCHA Semifinal |
| 2009–10 | St. Norbert | 24–4–3 | 14–2–2 | 1st | NCAA Runner-Up |
| 2010–11 | St. Norbert | 25–4–1 | 14–3–1 | 1st | NCAA Champion |
| 2011–12 | St. Norbert | 21–5–5 | 12–4–2 | 1st | NCAA Champion |
| 2012–13 | St. Norbert | 23–6–1 | 13–4–1 | 2nd | NCAA Quarterfinals |
| 2013–14 | St. Norbert | 28–3–1 | 16–2–0 | 1st | NCAA Champion |
| 2014–15 | St. Norbert | 20–6–2 | 13–4–1 | 2nd | NCHA Runner-Up |
| 2015–16 | St. Norbert | 25–4–2 | 17–2–1 | T–1st | NCAA Runner-Up |
| 2016–17 | St. Norbert | 22–6–1 | 14–3–1 | 2nd | NCAA Frozen Four |
| 2017–18 | St. Norbert | 27–4–1 | 15–3–0 | 2nd | NCAA Champion |
| 2018–19 | St. Norbert | 23–5–3 | 14–3–1 | 1st | NCAA Quarterfinals |
| 2019–20 | St. Norbert | 18–9–1 | 13–7–0 | 3rd | NCHA Runner-Up |
| 2021–22 | St. Norbert | 24–7–0 | 16–2–0 | 2nd | NCAA Quarterfinals |
| 2022–23 | St. Norbert | 17–9–2 | 12–5–1 | T–1st | NCHA Runner-Up |
| 2023–24 | St. Norbert | 23–7–0 | 15–3–0 | 2nd | NCAA Quarterfinals |
| 2024–25 | St. Norbert | 24–6–1 | 15–3–0 | 2nd | NCAA Quarterfinals |
| 2025–26 | St. Norbert | 22–7–2 | 13–3–2 | 2nd | NCAA Quarterfinals |
| St. Norbert: | | 696–184–62 (.772) | 377–100–33 (.772) | | |
| Total: | | 696–184–62 (.772) | | | |
National champion Postseason invitational champion Conference regular season champion Conference regular season and conference tournament champion Division regular season champion Division regular season and conference tournament champion Conference tournament champion

== See also ==
- List of college men's ice hockey coaches with 400 wins

Awards and achievements
| Preceded by Ed Gosek; Mike McShane | Edward Jeremiah Award; 2007–08; 2010–11 | Succeeded by Dominick Dawes; Jack Arena |
