= Ed Gosek =

American ice hockey coach

Current position
- Title: Head coach
- Team: Oswego State
- Conference: SUNYAC

Biographical details
- Born: 1961 (age 64–65); Oswego, New York, U.S.
- Education: State University of New York at Oswego

Playing career
- 1979–1983: Oswego State
- Position: Wing

Coaching career (HC unless noted)
- 1990–2003: Oswego State (asst.)
- 2003–present: Oswego State

Head coaching record
- Overall: 341–108–30 (.743)
- Tournaments: 12–8 (.600)

Accomplishments and honors

Championships
- 2005 SUNYAC champion 2006 SUNYAC champion 2007 NCAA National Champion; 2010 SUNYAC champion 2010 SUNYAC tournament champion 2011 SUNYAC champion 2012 SUNYAC champion 2013 SUNYAC champion 2013 SUNYAC tournament champion 2014 SUNYAC tournament champion 2017 SUNYAC champion 2018 SUNYAC champion 2025 SUNYAC tournament champion

Awards
- 2007 Edward Jeremiah Award

Edward Gosek (born 1961) is an American ice hockey coach and former player who was the NCAA Division III coach of the year.

== Career ==
Gosek was born and raised in Oswego, New York. He began attending State University of New York at Oswego in 1979 and played 4 years of varsity ice hockey for the team. During his time as a player, Gosek helped Oswego State become one of the top teams in Division II, winning two division titles, two division tournament titles, and making the first two NCAA Tournament appearances in program history.

After graduating with a bachelor's in education, Gosek remained in the area and became a coaching coordinator for the Oswego Minor Hockey Association in 1986. Four years later, he returned to his alma mater as an assistant under his former head coach, Don Unger. He remained in the position when George Roll took over in 1997 and the Lakers slowly built up into a power in the SUNYAC. While working as an assistant, Gosek returned to the classroom and earned a master's in education in 2001. Two years later, the Lakers posted their best record since Gosek's sophomore year and reached the championship game for the second time in program history. Afterwards, Roll left to take over at Clarkson and Gosek was named as his replacement.

Gosek's teams played well in his first few seasons, however, the team faltered in conference tournament for three consecutive years. In 2007, however, Oswego's record was good enough to get them a bid into the NCAA Tournament. He got his team to refocus after their failure in the conference tournament and Oswego won three games, including the final over three-time defending champion Middlebury, to win the program's first national championship. He received the Edward Jeremiah Award as the national coach of the year for the tremendous season.

After a slight two year lull, Gosek had his team back in the tournament and reached five consecutive Frozen Fours, including back-to-back championship game appearance. Unfortunately, he wasn't able to win a second title in that stretch. In the years since, Gosek has kept his team near the top of the D-III level. In 18 years behind the bench, he has yet to have a losing record and is the winningest coach in program history.

== Personal life ==
Ed's older brother Joe is a professional race car driver who has competed at the Indianapolis 500 and is a member of the Oswego Speedway Hall of Fame.

== Statistics ==
=== Regular season and playoffs ===
			Regular Season					Playoffs
Season	Team	League	GP	G	A	Pts	PIM	GP	G	A	Pts	PIM
1979–80	Oswego State	ECAC 2	—	—	—	—	—	—	—	—	—	—
1980–81	Oswego State	ECAC 2	—	—	—	—	—	—	—	—	—	—
1981–82	Oswego State	ECAC 2	—	—	—	—	—	—	—	—	—	—
1982–83	Oswego State	ECAC 2	—	—	—	—	—	—	—	—	—	—
NCAA totals			—	—	—	—	—	—	—	—	—	—

== Head coaching record ==
Record table
Season	Team	Overall	Conference	Standing	Postseason
Oswego State Lakers (SUNYAC) (2003–present)
2003–04	Oswego State	19–9–3	9–4–1	T–2nd	SUNYAC Runner-Up
2004–05	Oswego State	18–6–3	11–3–0	1st	SUNYAC Semifinals
2005–06	Oswego State	18–7–2	10–3–1	1st	SUNYAC Semifinals
2006–07	Oswego State	23–3–3	11–1–2	1st	NCAA National Champion
2007–08	Oswego State	18–6–2	13–2–1	2nd	SUNYAC Runner-Up
2008–09	Oswego State	18–8–1	11–4–1	2nd	SUNYAC Runner-Up
2009–10	Oswego State	26–3–0	15–1–0	2nd	NCAA Frozen Four
2010–11	Oswego State	23–5–0	15–1–0	1st	NCAA Frozen Four
2011–12	Oswego State	24–4–2	14–0–2	1st	NCAA Runner-Up
2012–13	Oswego State	25–5–0	14–2–0	1st	NCAA Runner-Up
2013–14	Oswego State	22–7–2	10–5–1	3rd	NCAA Frozen Four
2014–15	Oswego State	19–5–4	12–2–2	2nd	NCAA Quarterfinals
2015–16	Oswego State	14–11–2	8–7–1	4th	SUNYAC Semifinals
2016–17	Oswego State	21–6–1	13–2–1	1st	NCAA First Round
2017–18	Oswego State	18–6–2	13–2–1	1st	SUNYAC Semifinals
2018–19	Oswego State	19–7–2	11–4–1	2nd	NCAA Quarterfinals
2019–20	Oswego State	16–10–1	12–3–1	2nd	SUNYAC Runner-Up
Oswego State:		341–108–30	202–45–16		
Total:		341–108–30			
National champion Postseason invitational champion Conference regular season champion Conference regular season and conference tournament champion Division regular season champion Division regular season and conference tournament champion Conference tournament champion

== See also ==
- List of college men's ice hockey coaches with 400 wins

Awards and achievements
Preceded by Bill Beaney	Edward Jeremiah Award; 2006–07	Succeeded by Tim Coghlin
