= Mark Mazzoleni =

American ice hockey coach (born 1956)

Current position
- Title: Goaltending Coach
- Team: Retired

Biographical details
- Born: January 25, 1956 (age 70); Green Bay, Wisconsin

Playing career
- 1976–1980: Michigan State
- Position: Goaltender

Coaching career (HC unless noted)
- 1981–1985: Illinois–Chicago (assistant)
- 1985–1991: Wisconsin–Stevens Point
- 1991–1994: Minnesota (assistant)
- 1994–1999: Miami
- 1999–2004: Harvard
- 2004–2008: Green Bay Gamblers
- 2009–2014: St. Norbert (assistant)

Head coaching record
- Overall: 302–207–43

Accomplishments and honors

Championships
- 2× NCHA regular season champion (1989, 1990); 3× NCHA tournament champion (1989, 1990, 1991); 2× ECAC Tournament Champion (2002, 2004); 3× NCAA Division III Champion (1989, 1990, 1991)

Awards
- 1997 CCHA CCHA Coach of the Year

Mark Mazzoleni is an American retired ice hockey coach.

== Career ==
Mazzoleni played college hockey at Michigan State, graduating with a degree in Pre-Law in 1980. After a year he matriculated to the University of Illinois Chicago, serving as an assistant coach while also earning a master's in sports administration. In 1985 he got his first head coaching job with the Wisconsin–Stevens Point Pointers and went on to lead the team to three consecutive Division III National Championships.

After the 1991 title, he took a position as an assistant coach at the University of Minnesota. He remained with the club for three seasons before he got the opportunity to be the head coach of a Division I school. Mazzoleni stepped into the Miami job after George Gwozdecky left and, while he had success with the team (3 winning seasons in 5 years), he could not sustain the high level of success his predecessor had achieved. He was able to parlay his experience at Miami into a second head coaching job, this time at Harvard, replacing the embattled Ronn Tomassoni who had not been able to get the Crimson to post a winning season in 5 years. After a one-season hangover, Mazzoleni returned Harvard to ECAC prominence, winning the conference tournament in both 2002 and 2004 while finishing as the runner-up in 2003.

Similar to what he had done with Wisconsin–Stevens Point, after three successful seasons Mazzoleni left Cambridge, Massachusetts to take over as head coach of the Green Bay Gamblers, a USHL team based in his hometown. Mazzoleni seemed to be working the same magic he had at Harvard and Wisconsin–Stevens Point when the Gamblers made the playoffs in his second season, their first appearance in 4 years, but after another moderately successful campaign Green Bay took a sharp dip in the standings, finishing the 2007–08 season dead last with a 13–41–6 record and his tenure as coach was terminated.

Rather than hit the road for his next opportunity, Mazzoleni remained in the Green Bay area and founded a property restoration company, PuroClean, that specialized in repairing water, fire and similar damage to buildings. While he was establishing his new venture, Mazzoleni returned to the coaching ranks, serving as an assistant at St. Norbert College under Tim Coghlin, a member of Mazzoleni's first recruiting class as a head coach. Mazzoleni eventually stepped away from the game, focusing entirely on his business beginning in 2014.

== Head coaching record ==
=== College ===
Record table
Season	Team	Overall	Conference	Standing	Postseason
Wisconsin–Stevens Point Pointers Independent (1985–1986)
1985–86	Wisconsin–Stevens Point	12–12–0			
Wisconsin–Stevens Point:		12–12–0			
Wisconsin–Stevens Point Pointers (NCHA) (1986–1991)
1986–87	Wisconsin–Stevens Point	16–12–0	9–11–0	5th	
1987–88	Wisconsin–Stevens Point	18–10–2	15–7–2	3rd	NCHA semifinals
1988–89	Wisconsin–Stevens Point	34–5–2	23–1–0	1st	NCAA national champion
1989–90	Wisconsin–Stevens Point	28–4–6	19–2–3	1st	NCAA national champion
1990–91	Wisconsin–Stevens Point	27–9–0	16–8–0	3rd	NCAA national champion
Wisconsin–Stevens Point:		123–40–10	82–30–5		
Miami Redskins (CCHA) (1994–1997)
1994–95	Miami	18–5–6	13–8–6	5th	CCHA Final Five
1995–96	Miami	10–22–4	9–17–4	7th	CCHA quarterfinals
1996–97	Miami	27–12–1	19–7–1	2nd	NCAA West Regional Quarterfinals
Miami RedHawks (CCHA) (1997–1999)
1997–98	Miami	9–20–4	8–12–2	5th	CCHA quarterfinals
1998–99	Miami	11–20–5	9–17–4	9th	None
Miami:		85–83–20	58–61–17		
Harvard Crimson (ECAC Hockey) (1999–2004)
1999–00	Harvard	11–17–2	9–10–2	7th	ECAC first round
2000–01	Harvard	16–15–2	12–8–2	3rd	ECAC Third Place
2001–02	Harvard	15–15–4	10–9–3	3rd	NCAA East Regional Quarterfinals
2002–03	Harvard	22–10–2	17–4–1	2nd	NCAA Northeast Regional semifinals
2003–04	Harvard	18–15–3	10–10–2	6th	NCAA East Regional semifinals
Harvard:		82–72–13	58–41–10		
Total:		302–207–43			
National champion Postseason invitational champion Conference regular season champion Conference regular season and conference tournament champion Division regular season champion Division regular season and conference tournament champion Conference tournament champion

Awards and achievements
Preceded by Bill Wilkinson	CCHA Coach of the Year; 1996–97	Succeeded by John Markell
