= Chris Brooks (ice hockey) =

Canadian ice hockey player and coach

- Born: September 19, 1972 (age 54) Stratford, Ontario, Canada
- Height: 5 ft 10 in (178 cm)
- Weight: 192 lb (87 kg; 13 st 10 lb)
- Position: Centre
- Shot: Left
- Played for: Amarillo Rattlers (WPHL); Springfield Falcons (AHL); Mobile Mysticks (ECHL); Kalamazoo Wings (UHL)
- NHL draft: Undrafted
- Playing career: 1996–2003
- Coaching career

Current position
- Title: Assistant coach
- Team: Clarkson
- Conference: ECAC Hockey

Biographical details
- Education: Western Michigan University

Coaching career (HC unless noted)
- 1999–2008: Western Michigan (assistant)
- 2008–2011: Rio Grande Valley Killer Bees
- 2011–2017: Wisconsin–Stevens Point
- 2017–2022: Michigan Tech (assistant)
- 2022–Present: Clarkson (assistant)

Head coaching record
- Overall: 119–45–13 (.709) [College]
- Tournaments: 7–3 (.700)

Accomplishments and honors

Championships
- 2016 D–III National Championship

Chris Brooks (born September 19, 1972) is a Canadian ice hockey coach and former player. In June 2022, he became an assistant coach for the Clarkson Golden Knights men's ice hockey program.

== College career ==
Brooks attended Western Michigan University where he played four seasons of NCAA Division I hockey with the Western Michigan Broncos, then of the Central Collegiate Hockey Association (CCHA). During his freshman season his outstanding play was recognized when he was selected as the CCHA Rookie of the Year for the 1992–93 season.

== Professional career ==
He turned professional in 1996, joining the Amarillo Rattlers of the Western Professional Hockey League (WPHL) for the league's inaugural 1996–97 season. In his rookie season Brooks led the league in points with 110, and was named the WPHL's most valuable player. He played the 1997–98 season with the Mobile Mysticks of the ECHL, but also skated in four American Hockey League games (including two playoff games) with the Springfield Falcons. Brooks rejoined the Amarillo Rattlers for the 1998–99 season where he led the league by scoring 48 goals. During the 2002–03 season he skated in 11 games with the Kalamazoo Wings of the United Hockey League.

== Coaching career ==
Brooks commenced his coaching career in 1999 when he returned to the Western Michigan Broncos as an assistant coach. He remained with Western Michigan for nine seasons before accepting the position of head coach for the Rio Grande Valley Killer Bees of the Central Hockey League starting with the 2008–09 season, a position he held for three seasons. He then became the head coach of the ice hockey program for University of Wisconsin–Stevens Point, a position he held from 2010–2011 to 2016–2017. During his tenure, he led the Pointers to three straight NCAA Division III Men's Ice Hockey Championship appearances, finishing as runner-ups in 2014 and 2015 and winning the national championship in 2016. He held a 119-45-13 record in his 6 seasons with the team. In June 2017, Brooks was named an assistant coach for the Michigan Tech Huskies men's ice hockey program by head coach Joe Shawhan.

== Awards and honours ==
| Honours | Year |
|---|---|
| All-CCHA Rookie Team | 1992–93 |
| CCHA Rookie of the Year | 1992–93 |
| WPHL Most Points (110) | 1996–97 |
| WPHL Most Valuable Player | 1996–97 |
| WPHL Most Goals (48) | 1998–99 |
