= Jeff Meredith =

American ice hockey coach

Current position
- Title: Head coach
- Team: SUNY Fredonia
- Conference: SUNYAC

Biographical details
- Born: Rochester, New York, U.S.
- Education: SUNY Brockport

Coaching career (HC unless noted)
- 1982–1984: Ohio State (graduate assistant)
- 1984–1988: Hamilton (assistant)
- 1988–present: SUNY Fredonia

Head coaching record
- Overall: 411–352–95 (.534)

Accomplishments and honors

Championships
- 1994 SUNYAC Champion; 1994 SUNYAC Tournament Champion; 1995 SUNYAC Champion; 1995 SUNYAC Tournament Champion; 1997 SUNYAC Champion; 2007 SUNYAC Tournament Champion

Awards
- 1994 Edward Jeremiah Award

Jeffrey Meredith is a college men's ice hockey coach. He had been in charge of the program at SUNY Fredonia since 1988, winning more than 400 games in that time.

== Career ==
After graduating from SUNY Brockport with a degree in heath and physical fitness in 1982, Meredith began pursuing a master's at Ohio State University. While there, he served as an assistant for the men's ice hockey team under Jerry Welsh. After receiving a degree in Sport and Fitness Administration, Meredith became a full time assistant at Hamilton in 1984. Four years later, he was brought in to helm the year-old program at SUNY Fredonia.

Predictably, with such a new team, Meredith didn't have much success in his first year but he quickly turned the Blue Devils into winners. Fredonia posted three consecutive winning seasons in the early 90s but the best was yet to come. The Blue Devils produced one of the greatest performances in 1994, finishing the regular season with an undefeated record. Fredonia then won their conference tournament and made the program's first NCAA appearance. Fredonia's chance to join 1970 Cornell and 1984 Bemidji State as an undefeated NCAA champion ended with a 3–4 loss in the national semifinal. While the team wasn't quite unbeatable the following year, they were dual conference champions once more and marched all the way to the championship game. Fredonia was held scoreless in the match, losing 0–1.

Meredith led Fredonia to a third SUNYAC regular season crown in 1997 but the team dropped into the middle of the pack afterwards. While most results were positive, The Blue Devils didn't make another NCAA appearance until 2007. In the 2010s, the Blue Devils flagged, sinking lower and lower in the standings. They began to recover towards the end of the decade and enabled Meredith to win his 400th game in 2019.

== Head coaching record ==
Record table
Season	Team	Overall	Conference	Standing	Postseason
Fredonia State Blue Devils (ECAC West) (1988–1992)
1988–89	Fredonia State	5–17–1	4–15–1	14th	
1989–90	Fredonia State	17–7–2		7th	
1990–91	Fredonia State	15–8–1		7th	ECAC West Quarterfinals
1991–92	Fredonia State	15–9–1		5th	ECAC West Semifinals
Fredonia State:		52–41–5			
Fredonia State Blue Devils (SUNYAC) (1992–present)
1992–93	Fredonia State	11–15–1	7–4–1	3rd	SUNYAC Semifinals
1993–94	Fredonia State	25–1–4	11–0–1	1st	NCAA Third Place Game (Win)
1994–95	Fredonia State	25–5–4	12–2–0	T–1st	NCAA Runner-Up
1995–96	Fredonia State	14–11–3	8–5–1	4th	SUNYAC Semifinals
1996–97	Fredonia State	16–11–2	11–3–0	1st	SUNYAC Runner-Up
1997–98	Fredonia State	10–15–3	5–9–0	6th	SUNYAC Quarterfinals
1998–99	Fredonia State	13–14–1	11–3–0	2nd	SUNYAC Semifinals
1999–00	Fredonia State	11–13–3	8–4–2	3rd	SUNYAC Quarterfinals
2000–01	Fredonia State	12–11–3	7–5–2	4th	SUNYAC Quarterfinals
2001–02	Fredonia State	9–12–3	3–9–2	7th	
2002–03	Fredonia State	14–12–0	10–4–0	2nd	SUNYAC Semifinals
2003–04	Fredonia State	13–13–3	6–8–0	5th	SUNYAC Semifinals
2004–05	Fredonia State	16–6–5	9–3–2	3rd	SUNYAC Semifinals
2005–06	Fredonia State	17–9–3	8–3–3	3rd	SUNYAC Semifinals
2006–07	Fredonia State	15–10–4	5–7–2	5th	NCAA First Round
2007–08	Fredonia State	15–9–3	10–4–2	3rd	SUNYAC Semifinals
2008–09	Fredonia State	6–13–5	4–8–4	T–7th	
2009–10	Fredonia State	17–7–2	9–5–2	3rd	SUNYAC Quarterfinals
2010–11	Fredonia State	14–13–1	7–8–1	6th	SUNYAC Runner-Up
2011–12	Fredonia State	12–11–3	6–7–3	T–4th	SUNYAC Quarterfinals
2012–13	Fredonia State	7–16–3	5–9–3	T–5th	SUNYAC Quarterfinals
2013–14	Fredonia State	7–13–6	4–7–5	6th	SUNYAC Quarterfinals
2014–15	Fredonia State	4–16–5	0–13–3	9th	
2015–16	Fredonia State	8–14–3	4–10–2	7th	
2016–17	Fredonia State	13–11–2	7–8–1	5th	SUNYAC Quarterfinals
2017–18	Fredonia State	13–11–4	7–8–1	T–4th	SUNYAC Runner-Up
2018–19	Fredonia State	15–8–4	8–6–2	T–4th	SUNYAC Semifinals
2019–20	Fredonia State	7–11–7	4–9–3	7th	
Fredonia State:		359–311–90	196–159–48		
Total:		411–352–95			
National champion Postseason invitational champion Conference regular season champion Conference regular season and conference tournament champion Division regular season champion Division regular season and conference tournament champion Conference tournament champion

== See also ==
- List of college men's ice hockey coaches with 400 wins

Awards and achievements
Preceded by Joe Baldarotta	Edward Jeremiah Award; 1993–94	Succeeded by Bill Beaney
