= Bill Beaney =

Ice hockey coach

Biographical details
- Born: July 21, 1951 (age 75)

Playing career
- 1970–1973: New Hampshire

Coaching career (HC unless noted)
- 1977–1984: New England College
- 1986–2002: Middlebury
- 2003–2015: Middlebury

Head coaching record
- Overall: 601–260–59 (.685)
- Tournaments: 33–6–2 (.829)

Accomplishments and honors

Awards
- 1990 Edward Jeremiah Award; 1995 Edward Jeremiah Award; 2004 Edward Jeremiah Award; 2006 Edward Jeremiah Award

Bill Beaney Jr. (born July 21, 1951) is a retired college men's ice hockey coach. He has coached hockey teams in Vermont, New Hampshire and Maine, and was the head coach at Middlebury from 1986 until 2015. He led the Middlebury hockey team to eight Division III championships from 1995 to 2006 and ranks 13th all-time among college men's ice hockey coaches with 601 wins (as of 2021).

== Athlete ==
Beaney grew up playing hockey in the youth leagues of Lake Placid, New York, where he was coached by his father, Bill Beaney Sr. Beaney became a star athlete at Lake Placid high school. He was recruited by more than 30 colleges and enrolled at the University of New Hampshire ("UNH"). He played four years of varsity hockey at UNH and was the captain of the 1973 team.

== Coaching career ==
=== Early years ===
After graduating from UNH in 1973, Beaney coached hockey at the Bellows Free Academy in Saint Albans, Vermont. He led the BFA-St. Albans hockey team to three Vermont D-I state titles.

In 1977, Beaney was hired as the head hockey coach at New England College ("NEC") in Henniker, New Hampshire. When he took over, the NEC hockey program had been hurt by the academic dismissal of a handful of players. Beaney suffered with losing records in his first three years at NEC, but turned the program around in his fourth year as head coach. In his final four years at NEC (1981–1984), Beaney led the hockey team to a record of 60–37. He led the team to a berth in the NCAA tournament in 1984 with a record of 16-8-3. He was also named the New England Coach of the Year in 1982 and 1984.

In 1984, Beaney moved to the Berwick Academy in South Berwick, Maine, as the school's admissions director and hockey coach.

=== Middlebury College ===
In 1986, Beaney was hired as the head men's ice hockey coach at Middlebury College. After consecutive 7-16-1 seasons in 1987 and 1988, he turned the program around in 1990 with a 21–5 record. Middlebury did not have a losing season from 1989-90 to 2013-14. Since 1995, Beaney has led Middlebury to 13 appearances in the NCAA tournament and 8 NCAA Division III men's ice hockey championships. His teams won NCAA championships five straight years between 1995 and 1999 and again for three straight years from 2004 to 2006.

Beaney has received the Edward Jeremiah Award four times (1990, 1995, 2004, and 2006). The award is presented each year by the American Hockey Coaches Association to the Division III men's ice hockey Coach of the Year. Beaney and Mike McShane are the only coaches to have received the award four times.

After his team won its third consecutive NCAA championship, Beaney predicted a fourth: "If I had a choice - if I were to step to one side - I would also pick Middlebury. Good people attract good people, and we have a lot of players who want to come here." When Middlebury won its record-setting fourth consecutive NCAA championship in 1998, The New York Times wrote that the record was all the more remarkable given that it was accomplished by a small, academically oriented college with no athletic scholarships. The Times wrote:

"Without consulting Coach Bill Beaney, it is difficult to comprehend how a small college like Middlebury in Vermont can win an unprecedented four straight national championships in a sport as money-minded and competitive as hockey. The entrance requirements are stiff - average Scholastic Achievement Tests of 1,330 - and the annual cost of about $30,000 occasionally eased by a grant based on family need. There are no athletic scholarships."

When Middlebury won a fifth consecutive NCAA championship in 1999, the Boston Globe described the accomplishment as "padding a record of domination unrivaled in any level of college hockey." Beaney noted that the fifth championship was "the most special," because he had lost the entire six-player core that had been the foundation for his previous championship teams. In explaining how his young team had won the championship, Beaney offered what the Boston Globe called a bit of Green Mountain wisdom, "Like the sap that runs from the trees, anything is possible."

Beaney took a leave from his coaching duties for the 2002-2003 hockey season. Middlebury President John McCardell Jr., announced that Beaney had been granted time off from his coaching duties and would serve as an associate in the Office of College Advancement. He won three consecutive NCAA championships (2004–2006) after returning from the hiatus.

Prior to the 2004 NCAA tournament, Beaney took his players on a trip to his home town of Lake Placid. His players "explored every nook and cranny" of the rink where the USA Hockey team had won the Olympic gold medal in 1980 and played a pickup game on the speedskating oval where Eric Heiden won five gold medals. Despite having what Beaney called "the weakest ability level" of any of his championship teams, the team went on to win the 2004 NCAA championship. Beaney recalled, "It was the same as the 1980 U.S. team. They had an unbelievable belief in themselves. They knew they could count on each other. Our guys were sharing the same dreams the 1980 team did. It was our own little miracle."

Beaney is also the head coach of Middlebury's golf team. His Middlebury golf teams won New England Small College Athletic Conference titles in 1999, 2002, 2007 and 2009 and advanced to the NCAA golf tournament in 2008 and 2009.

=== USA Hockey ===
Beaney has been involved in USA Hockey for many years. He coached USA Hockey's Junior Olympic team from 1985 to 1997 and was the head coach of the U.S. Women's Junior National team from 1996 to 1997. He also served as the head coach of the East Team at the 1993 Olympic Festival, leading his team to the gold medal.

=== Coaching philosophy ===
Beaney has earned a reputation for his emphasis on team play. In an interview with the Boston Globe in 1998, Beaney described his philosophy, "Every player knows how to control the puck... Everyone plays aggressive two-way hockey. That's a major key. ... We work hard, but we take plenty of time off. Studies are first. The kids like it and we do everything as a team." A Vermont newspaper in 2005 published a feature story on Beaney's coaching philosophy which it dubbed "the gospel according to Bill Beaney." The elements of the Beaney gospel include such truisms as "don't take anything for granted," "they have to keep working hard," and "playing just one game at a time." And an emphasis on the team above the individual: "No one is bigger than the team. In order to succeed, you must work together and become a cohesive unit."

=== Overall coaching record ===
Beaney achieved his 500th career coaching win in January 2008 with a 6–3 win against New England College. He was the 18th college hockey coach to reach the milestone. In 35 years as a head coach, Beaney compiled a record of 601 wins, 260 losses, and 59 ties. At the end of the 2014-15 hockey season, Beaney ranked eleventh all-time among college men's ice hockey coaches in career wins.

== Family ==
Beaney's younger brother, Jeff Beaney, played hockey for Beaney at New England College. Jeff has been the head hockey coach at University of Southern Maine since 1987. As of 2006, the Beaney brothers had faced each other as coaches on 13 occasions, with Middlebury winning all 13 games. Jeff told a reporter, "People ask me all the time if it bothers me that my brother wins all the time. I tell them, 'If I can't win, I'm glad it's him.'"

== Head coaching record ==
Record table
Season	Team	Overall	Conference	Standing	Postseason
New England Pilgrims (ECAC 2) (1977–1984)
1977–78	New England College	7–13–2	3–12–1	29th	
1978–79	New England College	10–13–2	7–12–2	23rd	
1979–80	New England College	9–13–0	9–12–0	T–21st	
1980–81	New England College	16–8–0	14–6–0	8th	ECAC 2 East Quarterfinals
1981–82	New England College	15–10–1	15–9–1	9th	ECAC 2 East Semifinals
1982–83	New England College	13–11–0	13–10–0	11th	ECAC 2 East Quarterfinals
1983–84	New England College	16–8–3	16–6–2	6th	ECAC 2 East Quarterfinals
New England College:		86–76–8	77–67–6		
Middlebury Panthers (ECAC East) (1986–1999)
1986–87	Middlebury	7–15–1	3–14–1	15th	
1987–88	Middlebury	7–16–1	3–13–1	14th	
1988–89	Middlebury	11–12–1	7–8–0	7th	ECAC East Quarterfinals
1989–90	Middlebury	21–5–1	14–4–1	2nd	ECAC East Runner-Up
1990–91	Middlebury	22–3–1	17–2–1	1st	ECAC East Champion
1991–92	Middlebury	21–5–0	19–4–0	2nd	ECAC East Semifinals
1992–93	Middlebury	18–4–2	18–2–2	1st	ECAC East Quarterfinals
1993–94	Middlebury	13–11–0	9–8–0	10th	
1994–95	Middlebury	22–2–2	14–1–2	1st	NCAA National Champion
1995–96	Middlebury	26–2–0	17–2–0	1st	NCAA National Champion
1996–97	Middlebury	22–3–2	16–1–2	1st	NCAA National Champion
1997–98	Middlebury	24–2–2	16–1–2	1st	NCAA National Champion
1998–99	Middlebury	21–5–1	13–3–1	3rd	NCAA National Champion
Middlebury:		235–85–14	166–63–13		
Middlebury Panthers (NESCAC) (1999–2002)
1999–00	Middlebury	20–5–3	14–2–1	1st	NCAA Quarterfinals
2000–01	Middlebury	23–4–1	16–1–0	1st	NCAA Quarterfinals
2001–02	Middlebury	26–2–1	18–0–1	1st	NCAA Frozen Four
Middlebury:		69–11–5	48–3–2		
Middlebury Panthers (NESCAC) (2003–2015)
2003–04	Middlebury	27–3–0	15–3–0	1st	NCAA National Champion
2004–05	Middlebury	23–4–3	13–4–2	2nd	NCAA National Champion
2005–06	Middlebury	26–2–2	16–2–1	1st	NCAA National Champion
2006–07	Middlebury	20–8–3	11–6–2	T–1st	NCAA Runner-Up
2007–08	Middlebury	18–7–2	12–5–2	2nd	NESCAC Runner-Up
2008–09	Middlebury	19–7–1	14–4–1	2nd	NESCAC Runner-Up
2009–10	Middlebury	19–5–4	12–3–4	2nd	NCAA Quarterfinals
2010–11	Middlebury	11–8–6	9–5–5	4th	NESCAC Quarterfinals
2011–12	Middlebury	14–10–3	11–6–1	3rd	NESCAC Runner-Up
2012–13	Middlebury	13–11–2	11–5–2	T–4th	NESCAC Semifinals
2013–14	Middlebury	11–11–3	9–7–2	4th	NESCAC Quarterfinals
2014–15	Middlebury	10–12–3	7–8–3	7th	NESCAC Quarterfinals
Middlebury:		211–88–32	140–58–25		
Total:		601–260–59			
National champion Postseason invitational champion Conference regular season champion Conference regular season and conference tournament champion Division regular season champion Division regular season and conference tournament champion Conference tournament champion

== See also ==
- List of college men's ice hockey coaches with 400 wins

Awards and achievements
Preceded by Terry Meagher; Jeff Meredith; George Roll; Terry Skrypek	Edward Jeremiah Award; 1989–90; 1994–95; 2003–04; 2005–06	Succeeded by Glenn Thomaris; Dean Talafous; Terry Skrypek; Ed Gosek
