= George Roll =

American ice hockey coach (born 1962)

Current position
- Title: Head coach
- Team: Nazareth

Biographical details
- Born: October 9, 1962 (age 64); Blue Island, Illinois, U.S.

Playing career
- 1981–1985: Bowling Green
- Position: Wing

Coaching career (HC unless noted)
- 1988–1996: Clarkson (assistant)
- 1997–2003: Oswego State
- 2003–2011: Clarkson
- 2012–2025: Nazareth

Head coaching record
- Overall: 313–324–73 (.492)

Accomplishments and honors

Championships
- 1998 SUNYAC Championship; 2003 SUNYAC Championship; 2003 SUNYAC tournament championship 2007 ECAC tournament championship 2008 ECAC Championship

Awards
- 2003 Edward Jeremiah Award

George Roll (born October 9, 1962) is an American ice hockey coach. He was the head coach of the Clarkson Golden Knights from 2003 through the end of the 2010-2011 season, leading them to their most recent conference championship and NCAA tournament appearance.

== Career ==
Roll began his coaching career shortly after finishing his college career at Bowling Green where he was part of the 1984 National Championship team. He became a graduate assistant for his alma mater before joining first-year coach Mark Morris's staff at Clarkson. Roll remained as an assistant for eight years, helping Morris establish Clarkson as a power in ECAC Hockey, winning two regular season titles, two tournament titles, and making the NCAA tournament six times, including a Frozen Four appearance for the first time in over 20 years.

Roll left Clarkson to become the head coach of Oswego State, a Division III program, and in each of his seven years there the Great Lakers finished with a winning record. Unfortunately, other than a tournament appearance in his second season, Oswego State didn't have much else to show for his tenure until 2002-2003 when Roll pushed the Great Lakers to a 25-7-1 record, earning a regular season title, a conference championship, and were runners-up to the D-III National Title. Roll, however, decided against building on his earlier success after he was offered the top job at Clarkson, replacing his mentor Mark Morris after he was fired due to an incident in early November.

The first few years with the Golden Knights were rocky as Clarkson couldn't manage a winning record until the third year, but Clarkson won 25 games in 2006–07, including a conference championship and when they earned a regular season crown the following season it appeared that they had turned the corner. After that brief success, however, Clarkson declined rapidly, ending with losing records in each of the next three seasons and causing Roll termination at the end of the 2010–11 season. Roll quickly found a new job as he was announced as the first head coach for Nazareth College's new Division-III ice hockey program that was to begin in 2012-13. As of 2021 he is still in that position.

== Head coaching record ==
Record table
Season	Team	Overall	Conference	Standing	Postseason
Oswego State Lakers (SUNYAC) (1996–2003)
1996–97	Oswego State	13-12-2	9-6-1	4th	SUNYAC semifinals
1997–98	Oswego State	17-13-2	12-5-1	1st	NCAA quarterfinals
1998–99	Oswego State	15-13-3	12-5-3	3rd	SUNYAC runner-up
1999–00	Oswego State	15-11-3	6-6-2	4th	SUNYAC semifinals
2000–01	Oswego State	17-9-1	10-4-0	2nd	SUNYAC semifinals
2001–02	Oswego State	17-9-4	10-3-1	2nd	SUNYAC runner-up
2002–03	Oswego State	23-6-1	10-3-1	1st	NCAA Runner-up
Oswego State:		117-73-16	69-32-9		
Clarkson Golden Knights (ECAC Hockey) (2003–2011)
2003–04	Clarkson	18-18-5	8-12-2	9th	ECAC runner-up
2004–05	Clarkson	13-23-3	7-13-2	9th	ECAC quarterfinals
2005–06	Clarkson	18-17-3	9-11-2	8th	ECAC quarterfinals
2006–07	Clarkson	25-9-5	13-4-4	2nd	NCAA East Regional semifinals
2007–08	Clarkson	22-13-4	15-4-3	1st	NCAA East Regional finals
2008–09	Clarkson	10-19-7	8-10-4	t-8th	ECAC first round
2009–10	Clarkson	9-24-4	4-15-3	12th	ECAC first round
2010–11	Clarkson	15-19-2	9-12-1	t-7th	ECAC first round
Clarkson:		130-142-33	73-81-21		
Nazareth Golden Flyers (ECAC West) (2012–2017)
2012–13	Nazareth	6-19-1	1-14-0	6th	ECAC West Quarterfinals
2013–14	Nazareth	8-16-2	4-9-2	6th	ECAC West Quarterfinals
2014–15	Nazareth	12-10-5	7-4-4	3rd	ECAC West Semifinals
2015–16	Nazareth	8-14-4	5-9-1	5th	ECAC West Quarterfinals
2016–17	Nazareth	9-15-2	8-6-0	4th	ECAC West Quarterfinals
Nazareth:		43-74-14	25-42-7		
Nazareth Golden Flyers (UCHC) (2017–present)
2017–18	Nazareth	10-13-2	7-8-1	7th	
2018–19	Nazareth	12-9-7	8-5-5-1	5th	UCHC semifinals
2019–20	Nazareth	12-13-3	8-9-1-1	5th	UCHC semifinals
2020–21	Nazareth	0-11-0	0-10-0	8th	UCHC quarterfinals
Nazareth:		34-46-12	23-32-3		
Total:		313-324-73			
National champion Postseason invitational champion Conference regular season champion Conference regular season and conference tournament champion Division regular season champion Division regular season and conference tournament champion Conference tournament champion

Awards and achievements
Preceded by Dan Stauber	Edward Jeremiah Award; 2002–03	Succeeded by Bill Beaney
