= List of college men's ice hockey career coaching wins leaders =

This is a list of men's college ice hockey career coaching wins leaders. It is limited to coaches with at least 400 wins.

Jerry York, who coached men's ice hockey for 50 years at Clarkson University, Bowling Green State University and Boston College is the all-time leader in wins, losses and ties.

With 897 wins in 40 years at Boston University, Jack Parker is the all-time leader in wins with a single program.

== List of coaches with at least 400 wins ==
Statistics correct as of the end of the 2025–26 college men's ice hockey season.

= Coached one team	= Active Coaches

Rank	Name	Years	Wins	Losses	Ties	Pct.	Teams
1	Jerry York	50	1123	682	128	.614	Clarkson (1972–1979), Bowling Green (1979–1994), Boston College (1994–2022)
2	Ron Mason	36	924	380	83	.696	Lake Superior State (1967–1973), Bowling Green (1973–1979), Michigan State (1979–2002)
3	Jack Parker	40	897	472	115	.643	Boston University (1973–2013)
4	Red Berenson	33	848	426	92	.654	Michigan (1984–2017)
5	Rick Comley	38	783	615	110	.556	Lake Superior State (1973–1976), Northern Michigan (1976–2002), Michigan State (2002–2011)
6	Bob Peters	36	744	313	50	.695	North Dakota (1964–1966), Bemidji State (1966–1982, 1983–2001)
7	Mike McShane	37	741	348	69	.670	St. Lawrence (1980–85), Providence (1985–1994), Norwich (1995–2018)
8	Don Lucia	31	736	403	102	.634	Alaska-Fairbanks (1987–1993), Colorado College (1993–1999), Minnesota (1999–2018)
9	Tim Coghlin	32	706	193	63	.767	St. Norbert (1993–present)
10	Rand Pecknold	32	700	369	110	.638	Quinnipiac (1994–present)
11	Len Ceglarski	34	672	341	36	.658	Clarkson (1958–1972), Boston College (1972–1992)
12	Jeff Sauer	31	655	532	57	.549	Colorado College (1971–1982), Wisconsin (1982–2002)
13	Dean Fuller	41	637	388	68	.614	Fitchburg State (1984–present)
14	Bill O'Neill	41	626	436	76	.583	Salem State (1981–2023)
15	Bob Emery	30	624	215	65	.726	Plattsburgh State (1989–2019)
16	Rick Gotkin	38	617	580	114	.514	Mercyhurst (1988–present)
17	Bill Beaney	35	601	260	59	.685	New England College (1978–84), Middlebury (1986–2002, 2003–2015)
17	Jeff Jackson	26	601	343	99	.624	Lake Superior State (1990–1996), Notre Dame (2005–2025)
19	Dick Umile	28	598	375	114	.603	New Hampshire (1990–2018)
20	George Gwozdecky	27	593	391	85	.594	Wisconsin–River Falls (1981–1984), Miami (1989–1994), Denver (1994–2013)
21	John Rolli	32	577	224	43	.709	Mass. Dartmouth (1984–2016)
22	Mike Schafer	29	561	300	117	.633	Cornell (1995–2025)
23	John MacInnes	26	555	295	39	.646	Michigan Tech (1956–1982)
24	Jack Riley	36	542	343	20	.610	Army (1950–1986)
24	Terry Meagher	33	542	253	58	.669	Bowdoin (1983–2016)
26	Frank Serratore	33	539	564	115	.490	Denver (1990–1994), Air Force (1997–present)
27	Don Brose	34	539	362	78	.590	Concordia (MN) (1958–1962), Minnesota State-Mankato (1970–1983, 1985–2000)
27	Jack Arena	41	539	399	87	.568	Amherst (1983–2025)
29	Don Roberts	33	532	290	25	.643	Gustavus Adolphus (1964–1997)
30	Bob Daniels	33	510	625	117	.454	Ferris State (1992–2025)
31	Ed Saugestad	38	503	364	21	.578	Augsburg (1958–1996)
32	Scott Sandelin	26	493	423	105	.534	Minnesota–Duluth (2000–Present)
33	Steve Freeman	30	481	295	68	.610	Wisconsin–River Falls (1996–Present)
34	John Kelley	36	501	249	15	.665	Boston College (1933–1942, 1947–1972)
35	Joe Marsh	27	482	418	75	.533	St. Lawrence (1985–2012)
36	Don Vaughan	30	472	504	123	.485	Colgate (1992–2003, 2004–2023)
37	Wayne Wilson	26	471	337	82	.575	RIT (1999–2025)
38	Enrico Blasi	25	467	412	91	.528	Miami (1999–2019), St. Thomas (2021–Present)
39	Mark Taylor	25	465	178	56	.705	Hobart (2000–Present)
40	Bill Kangas	35	464	340	77	.570	Williams (1989–2017, 2018–Present)
41	Murray Armstrong	21	460	215	31	.674	Denver (1956–1977)
42	Bob Motzko	21	448	296	73	.593	St. Cloud State (2005–2018), Minnesota (2018–Present)
43	John Dunham	33	441	306	34	.586	Trinity (1974–2007)
44	Nate Leaman	23	441	312	104	.575	Union (2003–2011), Providence (2011–Present)
45	Bill Wilkinson	26	437	469	81	.484	Western Michigan (1982–1999), Wayne State (1999–2008)
46	Ed Gosek	22	427	149	38	.726	Oswego State (2003–Present)
46	Jeff Meredith	36	427	434	97	.496	Fredonia State (1988–present)
48	Guy Gadowsky	26	425	412	71	.507	Alaska (1999–2004), Princeton (2004–2011), Penn State (2012–Present)
49	Bob Gaudet	32	424	482	112	.472	Brown (1988–1997), Dartmouth (1997–2020)
50	Mike Gilligan	25	419	350	49	.542	Salem State (1975–1981), Yale (1983–1984), Vermont (1984–2003)
51	Terry Skrypek	23	415	194	45	.669	St. Thomas (1987–2010)
52	Tom Serratore	25	416	397	108	.510	Bemidji State (2001–Present)
52	Gary Heenan	25	416	193	55	.668	Utica (2001–Present)
54	Charlie Holt	24	412	313	22	.566	Colby (1962–1968), New Hampshire (1968–1986)
55	Dean Blais	18	408	248	63	.611	North Dakota (1995–2004), Omaha (2010–2017)
56	Craig Dahl	24	408	402	57	.503	Bethel (1981–1985), Wisconsin–River Falls (1985–1986), St. Cloud State (1987–2006)

== Active coaches nearing 400 wins ==
Coaches within 30 wins of reaching 400 for their career (as of the end of the 2025–26 season).

Name	Years	Wins	Losses	Ties	Pct.	Teams
Blaise MacDonald	29	384	381	103	.502	Niagara (1996–2001), UMass Lowell (2001–2011), Colby (2012–present)

== Historical winning percentage ==
Prior to 1970, college teams routinely played fewer than 30 games per season, sometimes far fewer. This made reaching 400 career wins nearly impossible for many coaches, particularly in the early years of the sport. The following list includes several coaches whose career winning percentage was among the best in the college hockey history (minimum 10 seasons), all of whom had all of or a large portion of their tenure prior to 1970. Coaches appearing on the list above are not included.

Name	Years	Wins	Losses	Ties	Pct.	Teams
Alfred Winsor	15	114	38	2	.747	Harvard (1903–1917, 1923–1924)
Ned Harkness	24	384	131	11	.740	Rensselaer (1949–1963), Cornell (1963–1970), Union (1975–1977)
William Harrison	10	127	47	6	.722	Clarkson (1948–1958)
Larry Armstrong	12	125	54	10	.688	Minnesota (1935–1947)
Vic Heyliger	23	353	158	21	.683	Illinois (1939–1943), Michigan (1944–1957), Air Force (1968–1974)
Jack Kelley	18	306	147	12	.671	Colby (1955–1962, 1976–1977), Boston University (1962–1972)
Cheddy Thompson	10	149	72	5	.670	Colorado College (1945–1955)
Cooney Weiland	21	315	173	17	.641	Harvard (1950–1971)
Albert Prettyman	26	141	80	7	.634	Hamilton (1918–1943), Colgate (1943–1944)
Clarence Wanamaker	11	97	57	4	.627	Dartmouth (1915–1918, 1919–1920), Yale (1921–1928)
Jack Roos	17	134	79	7	.625	Clarkson (1929–1944, 1946–1948)
Harry Cleverly	17	212	142	10	.596	Boston University (1945–1962)
George Menard	15	204	137	14	.594	St. Lawrence (1955–1967, 1968–1971)
Eddie Jeremiah	26	308	239	11	.562	Dartmouth (1937–1942, 1945–1963, 1964–1967)

== Notes ==
Shawn Walsh finished his career with 399 wins, however, that total excludes the 27 wins that were vacated as part of a pair of NCAA rulings on player ineligibility.
