= Ronald B. Stafford Ice Arena =

Indoor ice hockey arena in Plattsburgh, New York

- Cardinal Country
- Interactive map of Ronald B. Stafford Ice Arena
- Address: 167 Rugar Street
- Location: Plattsburgh, NY 12901
- Coordinates: 44.684815°N 73.477381°W
- Owner: State University of New York at Plattsburgh
- Capacity: 1,924

Tenant
- Plattsburgh Cardinals

Website
- gocardinalsports.com

The Ronald B. Stafford Ice Arena is a 1,924-seat indoor arena; part of the Plattsburgh State Fieldhouse. It is commonly known as "Cardinal Country."

The arena was officially changed to its current namesake in 1987 to honor longtime New York State Senator Ronald. B. Stafford, who retired in 2002 after more than 30 years of public service and support of the College and the North Country.

The facility underwent a $2.1 million construction project in Summer 2008 to install 1,517 theatre-style seats and 407 standing-rail positions, move the penalty box and scorer's table opposite the team benches, improve spectators’ navigation throughout the building, expand the pressbox, mount two new light-emitting diode (LED) scoreboards and add hard-wired and wireless Internet connections. The previous year, inefficient light bulbs were replaced with halogen-light fixtures and the walls were painted.

The ice surface is 185 feet by 85 feet, surrounded by new professional-height, pro-tempered glass and boards. The arena also boasts a state-of-the-art sound system.

Both the Plattsburgh State men's and women's ice hockey programs have renovated locker rooms and fully equipped athletic training facilities easily accessible from the ice. Some of the amenities include individual padded locker stalls, flat-screen TV, video equipment, stereo-sound system and changing rooms.

The school record of 4,000 fans (before the renovation) has been reached on 10 occasions.

International exhibition matches against teams from Russia and Sweden have been played in front of sellout crowds at the arena. One of the nation's finest facilities for NCAA Division III ice hockey, the Arena has been the site of six NCAA Frozen Four events—three men's and three women's--and numerous national and conference tournament games.

On the women's side, the Plattsburgh State Cardinals set a Division III regular-season attendance record on Feb. 8, 2006 with 1,736 in a 4–1 win over two-time defending national champion Middlebury — that record stood until Jan. 22, 2011; and the 2007 NCAA championship game outdrew its male counterpart by 300.

More recently, the women have captured back to back national championships in the 2013–14 and 2014–15 seasons. These wins give the Cardinals a total of four national championships, setting the record for the most titles in Division III women's ice hockey.

The women's ice hockey team played its first game in the arena on Nov. 9, 2001, defeating Elmira 2–0. The Cardinals have a 182-17-12 all-time record at home for an eye-popping .891 win percentage.

During the 2005–06 season, the Cardinals led NCAA Division III women's ice hockey attendance with 7,645 fans for 17 home dates, or a 449 average.

High school and youth hockey games are also played here.

Sporting positions
Preceded by Murray Athletic Center; Nelson Recreation Center	Host of the Division III men's Frozen Four; 1992; 1998	Succeeded by Aldrich Arena; Kreitzberg Arena
