= 1992 NCAA Division III men's ice hockey tournament =

- Teams: 8
- Finals site: Ronald B. Stafford Ice Arena, Plattsburgh, New York
- Champions: Plattsburgh State Cardinals (1st title)
- Runner-up: Wisconsin–Stevens Point Pointers (4th title game)
- Semifinalists: Wisconsin–Superior Yellowjackets (1st Frozen Four); Salem State Vikings (1st Frozen Four)
- Winning coach: Bob Emery (1st title)
- Attendance: 18,932

The 1992 NCAA Division III Men's Ice Hockey Tournament was the culmination of the 1991–92 season, the 9th such tournament in NCAA history. It concluded with Plattsburgh State defeating Wisconsin-Stevens Point in the championship game 7–3. All Quarterfinals matchups were held at home team venues, while all succeeding games were played in Plattsburgh, New York.

== Qualifying teams ==
The following teams qualified for the tournament. There were no automatic bids, however, conference tournament champions were given preferential consideration. No formal seeding was used, quarterfinal matches were arranged so that the road teams would have the shortest possible travel distances.

East						West					
School	Conference	Record	Berth Type	Appearance	Last Bid	School	Conference	Record	Berth Type	Appearance	Last Bid
Babson	ECAC East	20–3–3	Tournament Champion	9th	1991	Mankato State	NCHA	17–12–3	At-Large	5th	1991
Elmira	ECAC West	21–8–0	At-Large	5th	1991	St. Thomas	MIAC	19–9–2	Tournament Champion	6th	1990
Plattsburgh State	ECAC West	28–2–2	Tournament Champion	3rd	1990	Wisconsin–Stevens Point	NCHA	23–5–4	Tournament Champion	5th	1991
Salem State	ECAC East	17–8–0	At-Large	3rd	1987	Wisconsin–Superior	NCHA	21–6–1	At-Large	1st	Never

== Format ==
The tournament featured three rounds of play. In the Quarterfinals, teams played a two-game series where the first team to reach 3 points was declared a winner (2 points for winning a game, 1 point each for tying). If both teams ended up with 2 points after the first two games a 20-minute mini-game used to determine a winner. Mini-game scores are in italics. Beginning with the Semifinals all games became Single-game eliminations. The winning teams in the Semifinals advanced to the National Championship Game with the losers playing in a Third Place game. The teams were seeded according to geographic proximity in the quarterfinals so the visiting team would have the shortest feasible distance to travel.

== Bracket ==
Quarterfinals; March 13–14
Plattsburgh State	3	8	-
Elmira	1	1	-
Wisconsin–Superior	8	4	-
Mankato State	7	3	-
Salem State	6	3	3
Babson	4	4	0
St. Thomas	4	2	0
Wisconsin–Stevens Point	3	4	1

Semifinals; March 20
Plattsburgh State	8
Wisconsin-Superior	5
Salem State	7
Wisconsin–Stevens Point	12

National Championship; March 21
Plattsburgh State	7
Wisconsin–Stevens Point	3
Third Place Game
Wisconsin–Superior	6
Salem State	7*

Note: * denotes overtime period(s)
Note: Mini-games in italics

== Record by conference ==
Conference	# of Bids	Record	Win %	Frozen Four	Championship Game	Champions
NCHA	3	4–6–0	.400	2	1	-
ECAC West	2	4–2–0	.667	1	1	1
ECAC East	2	3–3–0	.500	1	-	-
MIAC	1	1–1–0	.500	-	-	-
