= 2016 NCAA Division III men's ice hockey tournament =

Collegiate ice hockey tournament

- Teams: 11
- Finals site: Herb Brooks Arena, Lake Placid, New York
- Champions: Wisconsin–Stevens Point Pointers (5th title)
- Runner-up: St. Norbert Green Knights (8th title game)
- Semifinalists: Geneseo State Knights (2nd Frozen Four); Massachusetts–Boston Beacons (1st Frozen Four)
- Winning coach: Chris Brooks (1st title)
- MOP: Eliot Grauer (Wisconsin–Stevens Point)
- Attendance: 12,645

The 2016 NCAA Division Men's III Ice Hockey Tournament was the culmination of the 2015–16 season, the 33rd such tournament in NCAA history. It concluded with Wisconsin–Stevens Point defeating St. Norbert in the championship game 5-1. All First Round and Quarterfinal matchups were held at home team venues, while all succeeding games were played at the Herb Brooks Arena in Lake Placid, New York.

== Qualifying teams ==
The following teams qualified for the tournament. Automatic bids were offered to the conference tournament champion of seven different conferences. Four at-large bids were available for the highest-ranked non-automatic qualifiers (overall seed in parentheses).

East							West						
Seed	School	Conference	Record	Berth Type	Appearance	Last Bid	Seed	School	Conference	Record	Berth Type	Appearance	Last Bid
1	Hobart (3)	ECAC West	21–4–2	At–Large	6th	2015	1	Adrian (1)	NCHA	24–3–1	Tournament Champion	6th	2015
2	Geneseo State	SUNYAC	18–4–6	Tournament Champion	5th	2014	2	St. Norbert (2)	NCHA	23–3–2	At–Large	16th	2014
3	Williams	NESCAC	18–5–2	At–Large	1st	Never	3	Wisconsin–Stevens Point (4)	WIAC	21–5–2	At–Large	12th	2015
4	Trinity	NESCAC	21–5–1	Tournament Champion	5th	2015	4	Augsburg	MIAC	17–8–2	Tournament Champion	3rd	1998
5	Massachusetts–Boston	NEHC	21–4–3	Tournament Champion	1st	Never							
6	Salem State	MASCAC	22–5–0	Tournament Champion	8th	2014							
7	Salve Regina	ECAC Northeast	17–10–1	Tournament Champion	1st	Never							

== Format ==
The tournament featured four rounds of play. All rounds were Single-game elimination. The top four overall seeds were arranged so that the first- and fourth-seeded teams would be in the same semifinal bracket while the second- and third-seeded teams would play in the other.

Because the third western seed had a higher overall ranking than the second eastern seed the western team was given a bye into quarterfinal round. Because both teams that received byes in one bracket were from the west both were placed in the same quarterfinal bracket to cut down on travel. To further cut down on travel the remaining western team received the final bye and would play the second western seed in the quarterfinals.

The top eastern team received a bye into the second round and would play the winner of the match between the fourth- and fifth-seeded eastern teams. For the remaining quarterfinal bracket the second- and seventh-seeded eastern teams would play with the winner advancing to play the victor of the game between the third- and sixth-seeded eastern teams.

With the fourth overall seed being placed in the same quarterfinal as the first overall seed, the remaining bracket contained the second eastern seed as the top-ranked team.

In the First Round and Quarterfinals the higher-seeded team served as host.

== Tournament Bracket ==
First Round; March 12
E2	Geneseo State	7
E7	Salve Regina	1
E3	Williams	7
E6	Salem State	1
E4	Trinity	0
E5	Massachusetts–Boston	4

Quarterfinals; March 15
W1	Adrian (1)	2
W3	Wisconsin–Stevens Point (4)	5
E2	Geneseo State	2
E3	Williams	1
W2	St. Norbert (2)	6
W4	Augsburg	1
E1	Hobart (3)	0
E5	Massachusetts–Boston	2

Semifinals; March 25
W3	Wisconsin–Stevens Point (4)	5
E2	Geneseo State	1
W2	St. Norbert (2)	8**
E5	Massachusetts–Boston	7

National Championship; March 26
W3	Wisconsin–Stevens Point (4)	5
W2	St. Norbert (2)	1

Note: * denotes overtime period(s)

== Results ==
=== First round ===
March 12, 2016; 7:00 PM	(E2) Geneseo State	7 – 1 (2–0, 3–1, 2–0)	(E7) Salve Regina	Ira S. Wilson Ice Arena – Geneseo, New York; Attendance: 1,417

Game reference

Devin McDonald
Goalies
Blake Wojtala
Referees:
Craig Florkowski
Mike Jones
Linesmen:
Brian Oliver
Rick Lembo

(Marra) Trevor Hills (21) – 00:33	1–0
(Marra, Solomon) Trevor Hills (22) – 12:14	2–0
(Collins, Hills) Anthony Marra (7) – 20:36	3–0
(Hills, Collins) Anthony Marra (8) – PP – 34:38	4–0
	4–1	36:48 – PP – Jonathan Felteau (4) (Sousa, Thompson)
(Ripple, Condon) Anthony Marra (9) – PP – 39:20	5–1
(Ripple, Marra) Arthur Gordon (9) – PP – 54:17	6–1
(Ripple) Nate Brown (1) – 59:11	7–1

6 min
Penalties
12 min
29
Shots
29

March 12, 2016; 7:00 PM	(E3) Williams	7 – 1 (1–0, 4–0, 2–1)	(E6) Salem State	Lansing Chapman Rink – Williamstown, Massachusetts; Attendance: 1,108

Game reference

Michael Pinios
Goalies
Marcus Zelzer
Referees:
William McGoldrick
Matt Bilack
Linesmen:
William Kingdon
Don Gosselin

(Cretella) George Hunkele (9) – 19:27	1–0
(Cretella) Joe Welch (3) – 21:30	2–0
(Mork, Lata) Colby Cretella (8) – PP – 26:16	3–0
(Masucci, Lata) Matthew Werner (1) – 35:38	4–0
(Johnson, Italiano) George Hunkele (10) – 39:41	5–0
	5–1	51:19 – Michael Casale (16) (Bettencourt)
(Doherty, Stickel) C.J. Shugart (7) – 53:12	6–1
(Masucci, Hilaire) Alex Hagerty (5) – 56:42	7–1

4 min
Penalties
27 min
38
Shots
19

March 12, 2016; 7:00 PM	(E4) Trinity	0 – 4 (0–1, 0–2, 0–1)	(E5) Massachusetts–Boston	Koeppel Community Center – Hartford, Connecticut; Attendance: 240

Game reference

Alex Morin
Goalies
Billy Faust
Referees:
Mike Pleau
Doug Race
Linesmen:
Michael DiPascuale
Patrick Woodward

0–1	07:42 – Mike Thomson (3) (Gallagher)
0–2	29:25 – Derek Colucci (8) (Sanipass, DeAugustine)
0–3	34:20 – Zach Lindsay (8) (Finger, Chuckran)
0–4	59:45 – EN – Derek Colucci (9) (DeAugustine)

4 min
Penalties
6 min
37
Shots
30

=== Quarterfinals ===
March 19, 2016; 7:00 PM	(W1) Adrian	2 – 5 (2–1, 0–2, 0–2)	(W3) Wisconsin–Stevens Point	Arrington Ice Arena – Adrian, Michigan; Attendance: 1,050

Game reference

Kevin Entmaa
Goalies
Max Milosek
Referees:
Eric Smevoll
Josh Hatinger
Linesmen:
Jon Haas
Mike Verdunck

(Hoy) Taylor McCloy (12) – 03:42	1–0
	1–1	05:46 – PP – Jonathan Davis (16) (Grauer)
(Dunn, Brothers)Taylor McCloy (13) – PP – 19:10	2–1
	2–2	24:36 – PP – Lawrence Cornellier (21) (Barber, Sharkey)
	2–3	39:49 – Jacob Barber (9) (Harris, Sharkey)
	2–4	59:12 – EN – Lawrence Cornellier (22)
	2–5	59:52 – PP – EN – Kyle Sharkey (18) (Milosek)

62 min
Penalties
34 min
42
Shots
40

March 19, 2016; 7:00 PM	(E2) Geneseo State	2 – 1 (2–0, 0–0, 0–1)	(E3) Williams	Ira S. Wilson Ice Arena – Geneseo, New York; Attendance: 2,139

Game reference

Devin McDonald
Goalies
Michael Pinios
Referees:
Derek Sylvester
Andy O'Brien
Linesmen:
Erik Geller
John McJury

(Burns, Tutton) Arthur Gordon (10) – 10:11	1–0
(Tutton, Solomon) Arthur Gordon (11) – 17:57	2–0
	2–1	50:46 – Colby Cretella (9) (Stickel, Mork)

4 min
Penalties
8 min
26
Shots
32

March 19, 2016; 7:05 PM	(W2) St. Norbert	6 – 1 (0–0, 4–1, 2–0)	(W4) Augsburg	Cornerstone Community Center – Ashwaubenon, Wisconsin; Attendance: 1,552

Game reference

Tony Kujava
Goalies
Jordyn Kaufer
Brandon Jones
Referees:
David Marcotte
Tony Lancette
Linesmen:
Jon Parker
Joe Oberg

	0–1	20:39 – Trevor Stewart (9) (Hendrickson)
(Cooper) Pijus Rulevičius (14) – 24:54	1–1
(Froese, Christensen) Ross Pavek (8) – 25:17	2–1
(Campbell, Froese) Riley Christensen (12) – PP – 28:31	3–1
(Pavek, Johansson) Riley Christensen (13) – 34:30	4–1
(Thompson, Pung) Pijus Rulevičius (15) – PP – 45:30	5–1
(Christensen, Froese) Ross Pavek (9) – 46:42	6–1

12 min
Penalties
36 min
40
Shots
16

March 19, 2016; 7:30 PM	(E1) Hobart	0 – 2 (0–0, 0–1, 0–1)	(E5) Massachusetts–Boston	Geneva Recreation Complex – Geneva, New York; Attendance: 533

Game reference
Lino Chimienti	Goalies	Billy Faust	Referees: Joel Dupree; Chris Shepley; Linesmen: Brian Oliver; Rick Lembo
0–1 / 29:00 – Matthew Lemire (15) (Larkin, Bishop); 0–2 / 52:05 – PP – Mike Thomson (4)			Referees: Joel Dupree; Chris Shepley; Linesmen: Brian Oliver; Rick Lembo
6 min	Penalties	6 min	Referees: Joel Dupree; Chris Shepley; Linesmen: Brian Oliver; Rick Lembo
42	Shots	29	Referees: Joel Dupree; Chris Shepley; Linesmen: Brian Oliver; Rick Lembo

==== Semifinals ====
March 25, 2016; 4:00 PM	(E2) Geneseo State	1 – 5 (0–3, 1–1, 0–1)	(W3) Wisconsin–Stevens Point	Herb Brooks Arena – Lake Placid, New York; Attendance: 653

Game reference

Devin McDonald
Goalies
Max Milosek
Referees:
Derek Sylvester
Tony Lancette
Linesmen:
John McJury
Brian Oliver

	0–1	04:30 – Jonathan Davis (17) (Graves)
	0–2	08:40 – Tanner Karty (7) (D'Avolio)
	0–3	15:50 – Andrew Graves (3) (Kalisz, Brooks)
	0–4	31:44 – Eliot Grauer (11) (Karty)
(Tutton) R.J. Burns (8) – SH – 38:42	1–4
	1–5	47:34 – Eliot Grauer (12)

8 min
Penalties
10 min
12
Shots
30

March 25, 2016; 7:30 PM	(W2) St. Norbert	8 – 7 (2OT) (1–3, 6–0, 0–4, 0–0, 1–0)	(E5) Massachusetts–Boston	Herb Brooks Arena – Lake Placid, New York; Attendance: 2,282

Game reference

Tony Kujava
T.J. Black
Goalies
Billy Faust
Zachery Andrews
Referees:
Eric Smevoll
Mike Pleau
Linesmen:
David St. Lawrence
Michael St. Lawrence

	0–1	01:04 – Derek Colucci (10) (DeAugustine)
	0–2	03:35 – Frankie DeAugustine (16)
	0–3	06:48 – PP – Matthew Lemire (16) (Daley, DeAugustine)
Steven Phillips (7) – 19:59	1–3
(Cooper, Hill) Blake Thompson (3) – PP – 23:29	2–3
Blake Thompson (4) – PP – 28:15	3–3
Erik Cooper (13) – 31:54	4–3
(Wahlrab) Tyler Andrews (1) – 35:27	5–3
(Cooper, Uchyn) Pijus Rulevičius (16) – PP – 39:05	6–3
(Nelson, Andrews) Pijus Rulevičius (17) – 39:53	7–3
	7–4	42:11 – John Bonno (2) (Chuckran)
	7–5	53:33 – Matthew Lemire (17) (Bonno)
	7–6	55:42 – PP – Brett Mason (2) (Chuckran, Colucci)
	7–7	58:42 – Tyler Bishop (11) (DeAugustine, Chuckran)
(Phillips) Noah Nelson (8) – 83:49	8–7

8 min
Penalties
12 min
51
Shots
39

=== National Championship ===
March 26, 2016; 7:00 PM	(W2) St. Norbert	1 – 5 (1–2, 0–1, 0–2)	(E5) Wisconsin–Stevens Point	Herb Brooks Arena – Lake Placid, New York; Attendance: 2,304

Game reference

Tony Kujava
Goalies
Max Milosek
Referees:
Derek Sylvester
Tony Lancette
Linesmen:
John McJury
Brian Oliver

	0–1	02:40 – PP – Eliot Grauer (13) (D'Avolio)
Tanner Froese (7) – PP – 09:25	1–1
	1–2	18:52 – PP – Alex Brooks (7) (Kalisz, Davis)
	1–3	38:40 – Kyle Sharkey (19) (Beauvais)
	1–4	44:44 – PP – Lawrence Cornellier (22) (Sharkey, Barber)
	1–5	46:38 – Jacob Barber (10) (Sharkey)

10 min
Penalties
4 min
22
Shots
39

== All-Tournament Team ==
- G: Max Milosek (Wisconsin–Stevens Point)
- D: Alex Brooks (Wisconsin–Stevens Point)
- D: Blake Thompson (St. Norbert)
- F: Erik Cooper (St. Norbert)
- F: Frankie DeAugustine (Massachusetts–Boston)
- F: Eliot Grauer * (Wisconsin–Stevens Point)

* Most Outstanding Player(s)

== Record by conference ==
Conference	# of Bids	Record	Win %	Frozen Four	Championship Game	Champions
NCHA	2	2–2	.500	1	1	-
NESCAC	2	1–2	.333	-	-	-
WIAC	1	3–0	1.000	1	1	1
SUNYAC	1	2–1	.667	1	-	-
NEHC	1	2–1	.667	1	-	-
ECAC West	1	0–1	.000	-	-	-
MIAC	1	0–1	.000	-	-	-
ECAC Northeast	1	0–1	.000	-	-	-
MASCAC	1	0–1	.000	-	-	-
