= 1995 NCAA Division III men's ice hockey tournament =

- Teams: 8
- Finals site: Duke Nelson Arena; Middlebury, Vermont
- Champions: Middlebury Panthers (1st title)
- Runner-up: Fredonia State Blue Devils (1st title game)
- Semifinalists: Wisconsin–River Falls Falcons (4th Frozen Four); Wisconsin–Superior Yellowjackets (3rd Frozen Four)
- Winning coach: Bill Beaney (1st title)
- Attendance: 12,340

The 1995 NCAA Division III men's ice hockey tournament was the culmination of the 1994–95 season, the 12th such tournament in NCAA history. It concluded with Middlebury defeating Fredonia in the championship game 1–0. All Quarterfinals matchups were held at home team venues, while all succeeding games were played in Middlebury, Vermont.

== Qualifying teams ==
The following teams qualified for the tournament. There were no automatic bids, however, conference tournament champions were given preferential consideration. No formal seeding was used while quarterfinal matches were arranged so that the road teams would have the shortest possible travel distances.

East						West					
School	Conference	Record	Berth Type	Appearance	Last Bid	School	Conference	Record	Berth Type	Appearance	Last Bid
Fredonia State	SUNYAC	23–3–4	Tournament champion	2nd	1994	Saint Mary's	MIAC	18–9–2	Tournament champion	2nd	1989
Middlebury	ECAC East	18–2–2	At-Large	1st	Never	Wisconsin–River Falls	NCHA	16–9–4	At-Large	5th	1994
Plattsburgh State	SUNYAC	20–7–2	At-Large	5th	1993	Wisconsin–Stevens Point	NCHA	13–11–7	At-Large	8th	1994
Salem State	ECAC East	17–5–1	Tournament champion	6th	1994	Wisconsin–Superior	NCHA	21–7–1	At-Large	4th	1994

== Format ==
The tournament featured three rounds of play. In the Quarterfinals, teams played a two-game series where the first team to reach 3 points was declared a winner (2 points for winning a game, 1 point each for tying). If both teams ended up with 2 points after the first two games a 20-minute mini-game used to determine a winner. Mini-game scores are in italics. Beginning with the semifinals all games became Single-game eliminations. The winning teams in the semifinals advanced to the national championship game with the losers playing in a Third Place game. The teams were seeded according to geographic proximity in the quarterfinals so the visiting team would have the shortest feasible distance to travel.

== Bracket ==
Quarterfinals; March 10–11
Fredonia State	8	3	3
Salem State	2	8	0
Wisconsin–Superior	8	5	-
Wisconsin–Stevens Point	4	2	-
Middlebury	3	6	-
Plattsburgh State	2	1	-
Wisconsin–River Falls	5	5	-
Saint Mary's	1	3	-

Semifinals; March 24
Fredonia State	4
Wisconsin–Superior	3
Middlebury	3
Wisconsin–River Falls	1

National championship March 25
Fredonia State	0
Middlebury	1
Third-place game
Wisconsin–Superior	5
Wisconsin–River Falls	6*

Note: * denotes overtime period(s)
Note: Mini-games in italics

== Record by conference ==
Conference	# of Bids	Record	Win %	Frozen Four	Championship Game	Champions
NCHA	3	5–5	.500	2	-	-
ECAC East	2	5–1	.833	1	1	1
SUNYAC	2	2–4	.333	1	1	-
MIAC	1	0–2	.000	-	-	-
