= 2011 NCAA Division III men's ice hockey tournament =

- Teams: 11
- Finals site: Ridder Arena, Minneapolis, Minnesota
- Champions: St. Norbert Green Knights (2nd title)
- Runner-up: Adrian Bulldogs (1st title game)
- Semifinalists: Norwich Cadets (9th Frozen Four); Oswego State Lakers (5th Frozen Four)
- Winning coach: Tim Coghlin (2nd title)
- MOP: B. J. O'Brien (St. Norbert)
- Attendance: 11,592

The 2011 NCAA Division III Men's Ice Hockey Tournament was the culmination of the 2010–11 season, the 28th such tournament in NCAA history. It concluded with St. Norbert defeating Adrian in the championship game 4-3. All First Round and Quarterfinal matchups were held at home team venues, while all succeeding games were played at the Ridder Arena in Minneapolis, Minnesota.

== Qualifying teams ==
The following teams qualified for the tournament. Automatic bids were offered to the conference tournament champion of seven different conferences. Four at-large bids were available for the highest-ranked non-conference tournament champions (overall seed in parentheses).

East							West						
Seed	School	Conference	Record	Berth Type	Appearance	Last Bid	Seed	School	Conference	Record	Berth Type	Appearance	Last Bid
1	Oswego State (2)	SUNYAC	22–4–0	At–Large	10th	2010	1	St. Norbert (1)	NCHA	22–4–1	Tournament Champion	12th	2010
2	Plattsburgh State (4)	SUNYAC	20–7–1	Tournament Champion	16th	2010	2	Adrian (3)	MCHA	23–3–1	Tournament Champion	2nd	2010
3	Norwich	ECAC East	20–5–3	Tournament Champion	12th	2010	3	Wisconsin–Superior	NCHA	16–12–1	At–Large	13th	2009
4	Bowdoin	NESCAC	18–7–1	Tournament Champion	4th	2010	4	Hamline	MIAC	16–6–5	Tournament Champion	1st	Never
5	Elmira	ECAC West	17–6–4	At–Large	14th	2010							
6	Neumann	ECAC West	14–8–5	At–Large	2nd	2009							
7	Curry	ECAC Northeast	16–8–3	Tournament Champion	4th	2010							

== Format ==
The tournament featured four rounds of play. All rounds were Single-game elimination. The top four ranked teams received byes into the quarterfinal round and were arranged so that were they all to reach the national semifinal, the first overall seed would play the fourth seed while the second seed would play the third seed.

The two lowest-seeded western teams were placed in the same first round match with the winner advancing to play the top western seed which was also the first overall seed. The eastern teams were arranged so that if the third seed were to win it would advance to play the fourth overall seed, if the fourth eastern seed were to win it would play the third overall seed and if the fifth eastern seed were to win it would advance to play the second overall seed.

Because the third overall seed was a western team, the fourth eastern seed was advanced to quarterfinal round so that it would have time to travel. This caused the third eastern team to play the seventh eastern seed and the fifth eastern seed to play the sixth eastern seed in the first round. In the First Round and Quarterfinals the higher-seeded team served as host.

== Tournament Bracket ==
First Round; March 9
E5	Bowdoin	2
E6	Neumann	1
W3	Wisconsin–Superior	2
W4	Hamline	3*
E3	Norwich	5
E7	Curry	1

Quarterfinals; March 12
E1	Oswego State (2)	7
E5	Bowdoin	5
W2	Adrian (3)	5
E4	Elmira	3
W1	St. Norbert (1)	4
W4	Hamline	0
E2	Plattsburgh State (4)	2
E3	Norwich	3*

Semifinals; March 25
E1	Oswego State (2)	3
W2	Adrian (3)	5
W1	St. Norbert (1)	3
E3	Norwich	2

National Championship; March 26
W2	Adrian (3)	3
W1	St. Norbert (1)	4

Note: * denotes overtime period(s)

== Results ==
=== First round ===
March 9, 2011; 7:00 PM	(E5) Bowdoin	2 – 1 (0–1, 2–0, 0–0)	(E6) Neumann	Sidney J. Watson Arena – Brunswick, Maine; Attendance: 1,850

Game reference

Steve Messina
Goalies
Ross MacKinnon

	0–1	13:34 – SH – Jake Kratz (3) (Tamane)
(Shearer-Hardy) Bryan Rosata (1) – 24:18	1–1
(Shearer-Hardy) Robert Toczylowski (5) – 37:25	2–1

18 min
Penalties
42 min
25
Shots
34

March 9, 2011; 7:05 PM	(W3) Wisconsin–Superior	2 – 3 (OT) (0–0, 2–1, 0–1, 0–1)	(W4) Hamline	TRIA Rink – Saint Paul, Minnesota; Attendance: 902

Game reference

Drew Strandberg
Goalies
Beau Christian
Referees:
Dave Marcotte
Jonathan Parker
Linesman:
Mark Gulenchln

	0–1	23:01 – PP – Jordan VanGilder (13) (Olson)
(Budziakowski, Isley) Josh Kesler (3) – 30:31	1–1
Talon Berlando (12) – 39:15	2–1
	2–2	51:15 – Danny Vranek (9) (Fifield, Belisle)
	2–3	65:19 – PP – Chris Berenguer (13) (Arrigoni, Lundbohm)

10 min
Penalties
2 min
38
Shots
30

March 9, 2011; 7:00 PM	(E3) Norwich	5 – 1 (2–0, 2–1, 1–0)	(E7) Curry	Kreitzberg Arena – Northfield, Vermont; Attendance: 1,837

Game reference

Joe Dawson
Goalies
Parker Carroll
Referees:
Bob Collins
Robert Hawkes
Linesman:
Charles Sisson

(Forkey) Chad Anderson (10) – 00:57	1–0
(Fulton, Janke) Scott Schroeder (19) – PP – 17:43	2–0
(Anderson, Baker) Blake Forkey (8) – 20:39	3–0
	3–1	24:53 – Michael Lopez (3) (Isham)
(Fulton, Gatien) Scott Schroeder (20) – PP – 36:06	4–1
Emmond Bell (6) – 47:20	5–1

23 min
Penalties
10 min
42
Shots
16

=== Quarterfinals ===
March 12, 2011; 7:00 PM	(E1) Oswego State	7 – 5 (2–2, 2–1, 3–2)	(E5) Bowdoin	Campus Center Ice Arena – Oswego, New York; Attendance: 1,962

Game reference

Steve Messina
Goalies
Paul Beckwith
Referees:
Joel Dupree
Tom Connors
Linesman:
Craig Florkowski

(Moodie, Huinink) Paul Rodrigues (13) – 07:04	1–0
	1–1	10:44 – Brendan Reich (8) (Rosata, McGarry)
(Mather, Mallaro) Jon Whitelaw (11) – PP – 15:44	2–1
	2–2	19:01 – Brendan Reich (9) (Rosata)
(Van Boxmeer, Carr) Luke Moodie (14) – 27:30	3–2
	3–3	29:04 – PP – Jeff Fanning (21) (Weiniger, Shearer-Hardy)
(Boots) David Titanic (2) – 38:26	4–3
	4–4	41:50 – Harry Matheson (14) (Weiniger)
(Mather, Boots) David Titanic (3) – 45:38	5–4
(Bremner) Owen Kelly (7) – 51:08	6–4
	6–5	55:55 – Harry Matheson (15) (Weiniger)
(Rodrigues, Van Boxmeer) Jon Whitelaw (12) – 56:30	7–5

8 min
Penalties
19 min
48
Shots
22

March 12, 2011; 7:00 PM	(W2) Adrian	5 – 3 (0–2, 3–0, 2–1)	(E4) Elmira	Arrington Ice Arena – Adrian, Michigan; Attendance: 1,000

Game reference

Brad Fogal
Goalies
Darren McDonald
Referees:
Brian Panek
Shaun McSweeney
Linesman:
Aaron Wallace

	0–1	02:06 – PP – Kevin Willer (13) (Linden, Vaillancourt)
	0–2	17:09 – PP – Brock Sawyer (2) (Herold, Schrank)
(Houston, Dahlinger) Sam Kuzyk (9) – 27:55	1–2
(Courtney) Brad Houston (14) – 30:14	2–2
(Miller, Graham) Shawn Skelly (19) – 35:55	3–2
(Waller, Dahlinger) Sam Kuzyk (10) – 41:07	4–2
(Gallinger, Cousineau) Joel Workman (8) – 41:23	5–2
	5–3	42:21 – Brock Sawyer (3) (Lee)

14 min
Penalties
12 min
29
Shots
23

March 12, 2011; 7:05 PM	(W1) St. Norbert	4 – 0 (0–0, 1–0, 3–0)	(W4) Hamline	Cornerstone Community Center – Ashwaubenon, Wisconsin; Attendance: 1,626

Game reference

B.J. O'Brien
Goalies
Beau Christian
Referees:
John Boche
Ed Moberg
Linesman:
Ryan Ourada

(Langford, Longley) Joe Perry (5) – 25:15	1–0
(Bernardy, Keefer) Seth Soley (5) – PP – 51:34	2–0
(Joanette, Keefer) Nick Tabisz (8) – 55:27	3–0
(Hammerbeck) Scott Pulak (4) – SH – EN – 57:02	4–0

19 min
Penalties
10 min
34
Shots
21

March 12, 2011; 7:00 PM	(E2) Plattsburgh State	2 – 3 (OT) (1–0, 1–2, 0–0, 0–1)	(E3) Norwich	Ronald B. Stafford Ice Arena – Plattsburgh, New York; Attendance: 1,776

Game reference

Josh Leis
Goalies
Parker Carroll
Referees:
Mike Jones
Mike Shea
Linesman:
Pat Richardson

(Clarke) Dan Sliasis (8) – 17:27	1–0
	1–1	20:29 – PP – Pier-Olivier Cotnoir (19) (Eskedjian)
(Corry) Kyle Kudroch (12) – PP – 39:36	2–1
	2–2	23:13 – PP – Pier-Olivier Cotnoir (20) (Janke, Thomas)
	2–3	77:43 – PP – Chad Anderson (3) (Thomas, Forkey)

8 min
Penalties
10 min
31
Shots
21

=== Semifinals ===
March 25, 2011; 4:30 PM	(E1) Oswego State	3 – 5 (0–2, 2–1, 1–2)	(W2) Adrian	Ridder Arena – Minneapolis, Minnesota; Attendance: 1,761

Game reference

Steve Messina
Goalies
Brad Fogal
Referees:
Tony Lancette
Joel DuPree
Linesman:
Dustin Martin

	0–1	14:19 – PP – Zach Graham (13) (Workman, Houston)
	0–2	19:45 – Andrew Dovey (11)
(Mallaro, Whitelaw) Andrew Mather (7) – PP – 22:36	1–2
	1–3	28:48 – PP – Shawn Skelly (20) (Miller)
(Whitelaw, Laganiere) Andrew Mather (8) – PP – 34:45	2–3
(Mather, Titanic) Ian Boots (15) – 41:18	3–3
	3–4	42:23 – Shawn Skelly (21) (Miller)
	3–5	59:17 – EN – Mike Towns (6) (Watson, Waller)

6 min
Penalties
8 min
42
Shots
31

March 25, 2011; 8:05 PM	(W1) St. Norbert	3 – 2 (0–0, 0–0, 3–2)	(E3) Norwich	Ridder Arena – Minneapolis, Minnesota; Attendance: 1,761

Game reference

B.J. O'Brien
Goalies
Parker Carroll
Referees:
Steve Olson
Mike Shea
Linesman:
Ryan Oorada

Cody Keefer (12) – 41:30	1–0
(Hoogenboom) Seth Soley (9) – 43:20	2–0
	2–1	45:39 – Travis Janke (12) (Cotnoir, Baker)
	2–2	51:14 – Pier-Olivier Cotnoir (21) (Eskedjian, Janke)
(Ryd, Longley) Scott Pulak (5) – 52:27	3–2

8 min
Penalties
2 min
18
Shots
41

=== National Championship ===
March 26, 2011; 7:00 PM	(W1) St. Norbert	4 – 3 (2–1, 2–2, 0–0)	(W2) Adrian	Ridder Arena – Minneapolis, Minnesota; Attendance: 1,741

Game reference

B.J. O'Brien
Goalies
Brad Fogal
Referees:
Tony Lancette
Joel DuPree
Linesman:
Dustin Martin

(Hoogenboom) Cody Keefer (13) – 04:15	1–0
	1–1	10:49 – Sam Kuzyk (11) (Dahlinger, Waller)
(Tabisz) Johan Ryd (10) – PP – 13:01	2–1
	2–2	27:10 – Kyle Watson (5) (Dovey, Gallinger)
(Hoogenboom, Longley) Cody Keefer (14) – PP – 30:38	3–2
	3–3	34:27 – Eric Miller (19) (Skelly)
(Ryd, Longley) Nick Tabisz (9) – PP – 35:26	4–3

6 min
Penalties
12 min
34
Shots
21

== All-Tournament Team ==
- G: B. J. O'Brien* (St. Norbert)
- D: Jeremy Klaver (Adrian)
- D: Nick Tabisz (St. Norbert)
- F: Cody Keffer (St. Norbert)
- F: Andrew Mather (Oswego State)
- F: Shawn Skelly (Adrian)

* Most Outstanding Player(s)

== Record by conference ==
Conference	# of Bids	Record	Win %	Frozen Four	Championship Game	Champions
NCHA	2	3–1	.750	1	1	1
SUNYAC	2	1–2	.333	1	-	-
ECAC West	2	0–2	.000	-	-	-
MCHA	1	2–1	.667	1	1	-
ECAC East	1	2–1	.667	1	-	-
MIAC	1	1–1	.500	-	-	-
NESCAC	1	1–1	.500	-	-	-
ECAC Northeast	1	0–1	.000	-	-	-
