= 1998 NCAA Division III men's ice hockey tournament =

- Teams: 8
- Finals site: Ronald B. Stafford Ice Arena; Plattsburgh, New York
- Champions: Middlebury Panthers (4th title)
- Runner-up: Wisconsin–Stevens Point Pointers (6th title game)
- Semifinalists: Plattsburgh State Cardinals (5th Frozen Four); Augsburg Auggies (2nd Frozen Four)
- Winning coach: Bill Beaney (4th title)
- Attendance: 11,108

The 1998 NCAA Division III men's ice hockey tournament was the culmination of the 1997–98 season, the 15th such tournament in NCAA history. It concluded with Middlebury defeating Wisconsin-Stevens Point in the championship game 2-1. All Quarterfinals matchups were held at home team venues, while all succeeding games were played in Plattsburgh, New York.

The championship marked the fourth in a row for Middlebury, a record for all levels of men's ice hockey.

== Qualifying teams ==
The following teams qualified for the tournament. There were no automatic bids, however, conference tournament champions were given preferential consideration. No formal seeding was used while quarterfinal matches were arranged so that the road teams would have the shortest possible travel distances.

East						West					
School	Conference	Record	Berth Type	Appearance	Last Bid	School	Conference	Record	Berth Type	Appearance	Last Bid
Middlebury	ECAC East	20–2–2	At-Large	4th	1997	Augsburg	MIAC	19–6–4	Tournament Champion	2nd	1984
Oswego State	SUNYAC	16–11–2	At-Large	6th	1991	St. Norbert	NCHA	26–5–0	Tournament Champion	2nd	1997
Plattsburgh State	SUNYAC	24–6–1	Tournament Champion	7th	1996	Wisconsin–River Falls	NCHA	22–6–1	At-Large	7th	1996
RIT	ECAC West	19–3–5	At-Large	8th	1997	Wisconsin–Stevens Point	NCHA	21–9–0	At-Large	9th	1995

== Format ==
The tournament featured three rounds of play. In the Quarterfinals, teams played a two-game series where the first team to reach 3 points was declared a winner (2 points for winning a game, 1 point each for tying). If both teams ended up with 2 points after the first two games a 20-minute mini-game used to determine a winner. Mini-game scores are in italics. Beginning with the semifinals, all games became single-game eliminations. The winning teams in the semifinals advanced to the national championship game with the losers playing in a third-place game. The teams were seeded according to geographic proximity in the quarterfinals so the visiting team would have the shortest feasible distance to travel.

== Bracket ==
Quarterfinals; March 14–15
Middlebury	5	6	-
Oswego State	1	3	-
Augsburg	3	4	-
Wisconsin–River Falls	2	3	-
Plattsburgh State	6	2	2
RIT	3	3	0
St. Norbert	3	1	0
Wisconsin–Stevens Point	1	2	2

Semifinals; March 21
Middlebury	5
Augsburg	2
Plattsburgh State	2
Wisconsin–Stevens Point	8

National championship March 22
Middlebury	2
Wisconsin–Stevens Point	1
Third-place game
Augsburg	5
Plattsburgh State	9

Note: * denotes overtime period(s)
Note: Mini-games in italics

== Record by conference ==
Conference	# of Bids	Record	Win %	Frozen Four	Championship Game	Champions
NCHA	3	3–5	.375	1	1	-
SUNYAC	2	2–4	.333	1	-	-
ECAC East	1	4–0	1.000	1	1	1
MIAC	1	2–2	.333	1	-	-
ECAC West	1	1–1	.500	-	-	-
