= 1998–99 NCAA Division III men's ice hockey season =

- Duration: October 1998– March 20, 1999
- NCAA tournament: 1999
- National championship: Kreitzberg Arena; Norwich, Vermont
- NCAA champion: Middlebury
- Sid Watson Award: Rob Smillie (St. Norbert)

The 1998–99 NCAA Division III men's ice hockey season began in October 1998 and concluded on March 20, 1999. This was the 26th season of Division III college ice hockey.

Division II Findlay joined with 4 Division III schools to form the MCHA. After the season the Oilers jumped up to Division I but were allowed to immediately participate in postseason tournament because they officially remained a D-II program.

== Regular season ==
=== Season tournaments ===
| Tournament | Dates | Teams | Champion |
|---|---|---|---|
| Blue Devil Invitational | October 23–24 | 4 | RIT |
| Pepsi Invitational | October 30–31 | 4 | Saint Michael's |
| RIT Tournament | October 30–31 | 4 | RIT |
| GN Shootout | November 27–28 | 4 | Norwich |
| PrimeLink Tournament | November 27–28 | 4 | |
| Babson Tournament | November 28–29 | 4 | Brockport State |
| Bowdoin Invitational | November 28–29 | 4 | Salem State |
| Elmira Tournament | November 28–29 | 4 | Elmira |
| Spurrier Invitational | November 28–29 | 4 | Amherst |
| Connecticut Tournament | December 11–12 | 4 | Mercyhurst |
| Codfish Bowl | December 29–30 | 4 | Saint Anselm |
| Cardinal Classic | January 2–3 | 4 | Plattsburgh State |
| Salem State Tournament | January 2–3 | 4 | Norwich |
| Hamot Hockey Classic | January 8–9 | 4 | Findlay |

=== Standings ===
1998–99 ECAC East standings
| | Conference | | | | | | | Overall | | | | | |
| | GP | W | L | T | PTS | GF | GA | GP | W | L | T | GF | GA |
|---|---|---|---|---|---|---|---|---|---|---|---|---|---|
| Norwich †* | 17 | 15 | 1 | 1 | 31 | 101 | 32 | 31 | 27 | 2 | 2 | 189 | 67 |
| Amherst | 17 | 14 | 3 | 0 | 28 | 80 | 28 | 24 | 19 | 5 | 0 | 114 | 55 |
| Middlebury | 17 | 13 | 3 | 1 | 27 | 83 | 30 | 27 | 21 | 5 | 1 | 132 | 52 |
| Williams | 17 | 12 | 4 | 1 | 25 | 60 | 39 | 27 | 18 | 7 | 2 | 107 | 67 |
| Colby | 17 | 9 | 4 | 4 | 22 | 69 | 39 | 26 | 13 | 9 | 4 | 98 | 63 |
| Trinity | 17 | 11 | 6 | 0 | 22 | 73 | 45 | 25 | 14 | 11 | 0 | 99 | 74 |
| Hamilton | 17 | 9 | 6 | 2 | 20 | 72 | 55 | 23 | 12 | 9 | 2 | 102 | 77 |
| Connecticut College | 17 | 9 | 7 | 1 | 19 | 58 | 45 | 23 | 11 | 11 | 1 | 77 | 68 |
| New England College | 17 | 8 | 7 | 2 | 18 | 67 | 73 | 26 | 11 | 13 | 2 | 100 | 132 |
| Massachusetts–Boston | 17 | 8 | 8 | 1 | 17 | 68 | 61 | 26 | 13 | 11 | 2 | 106 | 86 |
| Salem State | 17 | 7 | 9 | 1 | 15 | 51 | 54 | 26 | 14 | 11 | 1 | 88 | 76 |
| Babson | 17 | 5 | 9 | 3 | 13 | 52 | 60 | 25 | 7 | 15 | 3 | 83 | 101 |
| Bowdoin | 17 | 4 | 10 | 3 | 11 | 56 | 65 | 24 | 9 | 12 | 3 | 86 | 86 |
| Saint Anselm | 17 | 4 | 10 | 3 | 11 | 54 | 84 | 24 | 7 | 14 | 3 | 74 | 113 |
| Southern Maine | 17 | 5 | 12 | 0 | 10 | 41 | 71 | 25 | 8 | 17 | 0 | 66 | 109 |
| Wesleyan | 17 | 5 | 12 | 0 | 10 | 56 | 70 | 24 | 10 | 14 | 0 | 87 | 95 |
| Skidmore | 17 | 3 | 14 | 0 | 6 | 29 | 109 | 22 | 6 | 16 | 0 | 49 | 132 |
| MCLA | 17 | 0 | 16 | 1 | 1 | 27 | 131 | 25 | 4 | 20 | 1 | 59 | 170 |
Championship: March 5, 1999 † indicates conference regular season champion * indicates conference tournament champion

1998–99 ECAC Northeast standings
| | Conference | | | | | | | Overall | | | | | |
| | GP | W | L | T | PTS | GF | GA | GP | W | L | T | GF | GA |
|---|---|---|---|---|---|---|---|---|---|---|---|---|---|
| Massachusetts–Dartmouth † | 17 | 14 | 1 | 2 | 30 | 95 | 37 | 28 | 20 | 5 | 3 | 134 | 82 |
| Fitchburg State †* | 17 | 14 | 1 | 2 | 30 | 109 | 46 | 28 | 20 | 5 | 3 | 152 | 82 |
| Wentworth | 17 | 13 | 3 | 1 | 27 | 87 | 36 | 26 | 16 | 9 | 1 | 125 | 71 |
| Saint Michael's | 17 | 12 | 4 | 1 | 25 | 90 | 53 | 28 | 16 | 10 | 2 | 130 | 112 |
| Tufts | 17 | 12 | 4 | 1 | 25 | 101 | 53 | 24 | 13 | 10 | 1 | 126 | 84 |
| New Hampshire College | 17 | 11 | 5 | 1 | 23 | 90 | 58 | 27 | 17 | 8 | 2 | 143 | 93 |
| Plymouth State | 17 | 10 | 7 | 0 | 20 | 73 | 50 | 25 | 13 | 12 | 0 | 90 | 74 |
| Johnson & Wales | 17 | 9 | 8 | 0 | 18 | 75 | 66 | 26 | 12 | 14 | 0 | 113 | 106 |
| Western New England | 17 | 9 | 8 | 0 | 18 | 75 | 66 | 23 | 9 | 13 | 1 | 106 | 123 |
| Lebanon Valley | 17 | 8 | 8 | 1 | 17 | 59 | 61 | 21 | 12 | 8 | 1 | 95 | 66 |
| Stonehill | 17 | 8 | 8 | 1 | 17 | 79 | 80 | 22 | 12 | 9 | 1 | 99 | 92 |
| Nichols | 17 | 6 | 10 | 1 | 13 | 56 | 118 | 24 | 8 | 15 | 1 | 81 | 171 |
| Assumption | 16‡ | 6 | 9 | 1 | 13 | 65 | 81 | 24 | 7 | 16 | 1 | 83 | 128 |
| Framingham State | 17 | 6 | 11 | 0 | 12 | 71 | 70 | 24 | 6 | 18 | 0 | 85 | 124 |
| Worcester State | 16‡ | 4 | 12 | 0 | 8 | 56 | 84 | 24 | 6 | 18 | 0 | 75 | 129 |
| Suffolk | 17 | 3 | 13 | 1 | 7 | 61 | 108 | 21 | 5 | 15 | 1 | 83 | 128 |
| Curry | 17 | 3 | 14 | 0 | 6 | 54 | 97 | 24 | 6 | 18 | 0 | 85 | 126 |
| Salve Regina | 17 | 1 | 16 | 0 | 2 | 42 | 146 | 20 | 2 | 18 | 0 | 56 | 162 |
Championship: March 10, 1999 † indicates conference regular season champion * indicates conference tournament champion ‡ a game between Assumption and Worcester State was cancelled.

1998–99 ECAC West standings
| | Conference | | | | | | | Overall | | | | | |
| | GP | W | L | T | PTS | GF | GA | GP | W | L | T | GF | GA |
|---|---|---|---|---|---|---|---|---|---|---|---|---|---|
| RIT †* | 6 | 4 | 0 | 2 | 10 | 28 | 19 | 32 | 27 | 3 | 2 | 218 | 90 |
| Elmira | 6 | 4 | 1 | 1 | 9 | 37 | 20 | 26 | 16 | 8 | 2 | 152 | 93 |
| Mercyhurst | 6 | 2 | 3 | 1 | 5 | 24 | 26 | 28 | 16 | 10 | 2 | 144 | 103 |
| Hobart | 6 | 0 | 6 | 0 | 0 | 10 | 34 | 25 | 9 | 15 | 1 | 102 | 112 |
Championship: March 6, 1999 † indicates conference regular season champion * indicates conference tournament champions

1998–99 NCAA Division III Independent ice hockey standings
| | Overall record | | | | | |
| | GP | W | L | T | GF | GA |
|---|---|---|---|---|---|---|
| Neumann | 20 | 6 | 12 | 2 | | |
| Scranton | 8 | 2 | 6 | 0 | | |

1998–99 Midwest Collegiate Hockey Association standings
| | Conference | | | | | | | Overall | | | | | |
| | GP | W | L | T | Pct. | GF | GA | GP | W | L | T | GF | GA |
|---|---|---|---|---|---|---|---|---|---|---|---|---|---|
| Findlay †* | 11 | 11 | 0 | 0 | 1.000 | 139 | 16 | 28 | 23 | 5 | 0 | 241 | 68 |
| Marian | 18 | 14 | 3 | 1 | .806 | 156 | 40 | 26 | 16 | 9 | 1 | 172 | 88 |
| MSOE | 15 | 6 | 7 | 2 | .467 | 69 | 88 | 27 | 8 | 17 | 2 | 102 | 184 |
| Northland | 16 | 5 | 8 | 3 | .406 | 79 | 96 | 20 | 6 | 11 | 3 | 92 | 145 |
| Lawrence | 15 | 4 | 9 | 2 | .333 | 69 | 82 | 23 | 8 | 11 | 4 | 110 | 107 |
| Benedictine | 13 | 0 | 13 | 0 | .000 | 19 | 209 | 13 | 0 | 13 | 0 | 19 | 209 |
Championship: February 27, 1999 † indicates conference regular season champion * indicates conference tournament champions Lawrence played their entire Division III schedule against MCHA schools but did not formally join the conference until 1999-2000

1998–99 Minnesota Intercollegiate Athletic Conference ice hockey standings
| | Conference | | | | | | | Overall | | | | | |
| | GP | W | L | T | Pts | GF | GA | GP | W | L | T | GF | GA |
|---|---|---|---|---|---|---|---|---|---|---|---|---|---|
| St. Thomas †* | 16 | 11 | 4 | 1 | 23 | 75 | 44 | 31 | 16 | 12 | 3 | 123 | 107 |
| Saint John's | 16 | 10 | 4 | 2 | 22 | 85 | 52 | 27 | 13 | 12 | 2 | 128 | 94 |
| Concordia (MN) | 16 | 9 | 5 | 2 | 20 | 63 | 38 | 29 | 14 | 12 | 3 | 100 | 87 |
| Augsburg | 16 | 8 | 5 | 3 | 19 | 67 | 48 | 26 | 11 | 12 | 4 | 92 | 88 |
| Saint Mary's | 16 | 8 | 5 | 3 | 19 | 85 | 58 | 25 | 11 | 10 | 4 | 116 | 89 |
| Gustavus Adolphus | 16 | 8 | 7 | 1 | 17 | 66 | 54 | 25 | 13 | 11 | 1 | 93 | 82 |
| Bethel | 16 | 8 | 7 | 1 | 17 | 81 | 68 | 25 | 11 | 13 | 1 | 116 | 119 |
| St. Olaf | 16 | 3 | 12 | 1 | 7 | 42 | 80 | 25 | 8 | 16 | 1 | 77 | 109 |
| Hamline | 16 | 0 | 16 | 0 | 0 | 30 | 152 | 25 | 2 | 23 | 0 | 60 | 218 |
Championship: March 6, 1999 † indicates conference regular season champion * indicates conference tournament champion

1998–99 Northern Collegiate Hockey Association standings
| | Conference | | | | | | | Overall | | | | | |
| | GP | W | L | T | Pts | GF | GA | GP | W | L | T | GF | GA |
|---|---|---|---|---|---|---|---|---|---|---|---|---|---|
| St. Norbert †* | 16 | 12 | 2 | 2 | 26 | 79 | 32 | 33 | 25 | 5 | 3 | 170 | 73 |
| Wisconsin–River Falls | 16 | 12 | 4 | 0 | 24 | 55 | 33 | 31 | 22 | 9 | 0 | 109 | 82 |
| Bemidji State | 16 | 10 | 6 | 0 | 20 | 57 | 44 | 30 | 17 | 13 | 0 | 114 | 103 |
| Wisconsin–Stevens Point | 16 | 10 | 6 | 0 | 20 | 76 | 57 | 29 | 17 | 11 | 1 | 135 | 99 |
| Wisconsin–Superior | 16 | 9 | 6 | 1 | 19 | 68 | 46 | 33 | 22 | 8 | 3 | 149 | 93 |
| Wisconsin–Stout | 16 | 6 | 9 | 1 | 13 | 62 | 69 | 27 | 9 | 16 | 2 | 95 | 118 |
| Wisconsin–Eau Claire | 16 | 4 | 10 | 2 | 10 | 64 | 73 | 27 | 10 | 15 | 2 | 112 | 113 |
| Lake Forest | 16 | 4 | 12 | 0 | 8 | 34 | 70 | 26 | 7 | 17 | 2 | 67 | 110 |
| St. Scholastica | 16 | 2 | 14 | 0 | 4 | 35 | 105 | 27 | 7 | 20 | 0 | 80 | 152 |
Championship: March 6, 1999 † indicates conference regular season champion * indicates conference tournament champion Bemidji State was ineligible for Division III tournaments

1998–99 State University of New York Athletic Conference ice hockey standings
| | Conference | | | | | | | Overall | | | | | |
| | GP | W | L | T | PTS | GF | GA | GP | W | L | T | GF | GA |
|---|---|---|---|---|---|---|---|---|---|---|---|---|---|
| Plattsburgh State †* | 14 | 13 | 0 | 1 | 27 | 94 | 29 | 31 | 23 | 5 | 3 | 190 | 82 |
| Fredonia State | 14 | 11 | 3 | 0 | 22 | 53 | 30 | 28 | 13 | 14 | 1 | 89 | 101 |
| Oswego State | 14 | 10 | 4 | 0 | 20 | 65 | 34 | 31 | 15 | 13 | 3 | 127 | 105 |
| Geneseo State | 14 | 8 | 6 | 0 | 16 | 54 | 43 | 28 | 12 | 14 | 2 | 102 | 124 |
| Potsdam State | 14 | 6 | 8 | 0 | 12 | 39 | 55 | 27 | 8 | 18 | 1 | 82 | 127 |
| Brockport State | 14 | 3 | 9 | 2 | 8 | 37 | 57 | 28 | 7 | 18 | 3 | 82 | 112 |
| Cortland State | 14 | 2 | 12 | 0 | 4 | 27 | 77 | 25 | 2 | 23 | 0 | 45 | 174 |
| Buffalo State | 14 | 1 | 12 | 1 | 3 | 22 | 66 | 23 | 3 | 19 | 1 | 40 | 135 |
Championship: March 6, 1999 † indicates conference regular season champion * indicates conference tournament champions

Note: Mini-game are not included in final standings

== 1999 NCAA tournament ==
Quarterfinals; March 12–13
St. Norbert | 4 | 3 | 0
Middlebury | 2 | 6 | 2
RIT | 7 | 6 | -
Amherst | 2 | 2 | -
Wisconsin–Superior | 5 | 4 | -
St. Thomas | 5 | 3 | -
Norwich | 4 | 3 | -
Plattsburgh State | 4 | 2 | -

Semifinals; March 19
Middlebury | 9
RIT | 3
Wisconsin–Superior | 4
Norwich | 2

National championship March 20
Middlebury | 5
Wisconsin–Superior | 0
Third-place game
RIT | 2
Norwich | 9

Note: * denotes overtime period(s)

== See also ==
- 1998–99 NCAA Division I men's ice hockey season
- 1998–99 NCAA Division II men's ice hockey season
