= Wisconsin–Stevens Point Pointers =

- University: University of Wisconsin–Stevens Point
- Nickname: Pointers
- NCAA: Division III
- Conference: WIAC
- Location: Stevens Point, Wisconsin
- Football stadium: Goerke Field
- Basketball arena: Quandt Fieldhouse
- Soccer stadium: Loos Family Field
- Lacrosse stadium: Loos Family Field
- Colors: Purple and gold
- Website: athletics.uwsp.edu
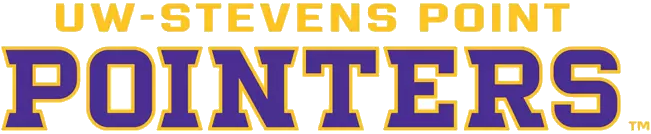

Team NCAA championships
- 13

The University of Wisconsin–Stevens Point Pointers (casually known as the UW–Stevens Point Pointers) are the athletic teams of the University of Wisconsin–Stevens Point. The Pointers athletic teams compete in NCAA Division III.

The visible mascot and logo of the Pointers is a pointer dog. The first use of a "pointer" mascot was on a student newspaper from 1916, with a side-profile view consistent with the current UW-Stevens Point athletics logo. "Stevie the Pointer" was first mentioned in a 1953 yearbook.

== Varsity teams ==
Men's sports	Women's sports
Baseball	Basketball
Basketball	Cross country
Cross country	Golf
Football	Ice hockey
Golf	Lacrosse
Ice hockey	Soccer
Soccer	Softball
Swimming	Swimming
Tennis	Tennis
Track and field	Track and field
Volleyball	Volleyball
Wrestling	Wrestling

=== Baseball ===
The UWSP baseball team has been in the NCAA Division III College World Series six times, most recently in 2022. Their best finish was third place in the 2007 Division III College World Series.

=== Basketball ===
The Pointers men's and women's basketball teams have combined for six NCAA Division III titles. The women's basketball team won the national title in 2002, 15 years after its first NCAA Division III title in 1987. The men's basketball team won back-to-back NCAA Division III titles in 2004 and 2005.

=== Football ===
The UW-Stevens Point football team holds the annual Spud Bowl game sponsored by local potato farms and brewery companies as the first home game of the season. The Pointers also hold the annual Pink Game, which benefits the Susan G. Komen Foundation of Central Wisconsin, and the Circle of Friends Foundation, which provides opportunities to kids with cancer. The Pointers play their home games at Goerke Field.

=== Track and field ===
The UWSP men's track and field teams have won 3 individual NAIA national titles and 16 individual NCAA Division III national titles. The women's teams have combined to win 13 individual NCAA Division III titles. The men's team has had 61 All-American performances at the NCAA Division III Indoor Track & Field Championships since 1985 and over 70 at the NCAA Division III Outdoor Track and Field Championships since 1982. The women have had 24 indoor NCAA Division III All-American performances between 1985 and 2007 and 27 Outdoor All-American performances from 1984 to 2007.

The men's assistant track team coach Rick Witt, who has been head coach for over 30 years, was named National Coach of the Year once, Regional Coach of the Year seven times, and Conference Coach of the Year 14 times. The pointers most recent nationals appearance came in 2024 when the Pointers competed in the 2024 NCAA Cross Country Championships in Terre haute Indiana.

=== Tennis ===
The UW-Stevens Point tennis program has varsity men's and women's tennis. The women's tennis program was launched in 1966, and is playing it's 60th consecutive season this year. The men's program was cut in 1990 after "50 years of excellence" according to UWSP but has since been reinstated in the 2022-23 school year. The program has been attempting to rise back to greatness under the current guidance of coaches Phil Kuenzi and Demetri Bush after the orinally hired Coach Matt Hockett stepped down before the beginning of the initial season. Important players since the relaunch of the program include Steven Benoy, Frederick Diehl, Dawson Froemming, and tennis YouTube sensation Conner Kryscio. Since reinstatement, the Pointers record was 8-13 in 2022-23, 5-17 in 2023-24, 10-13 in 2024-24, and most recently 8-15 in 2025-26.

== National championships ==
=== Team ===
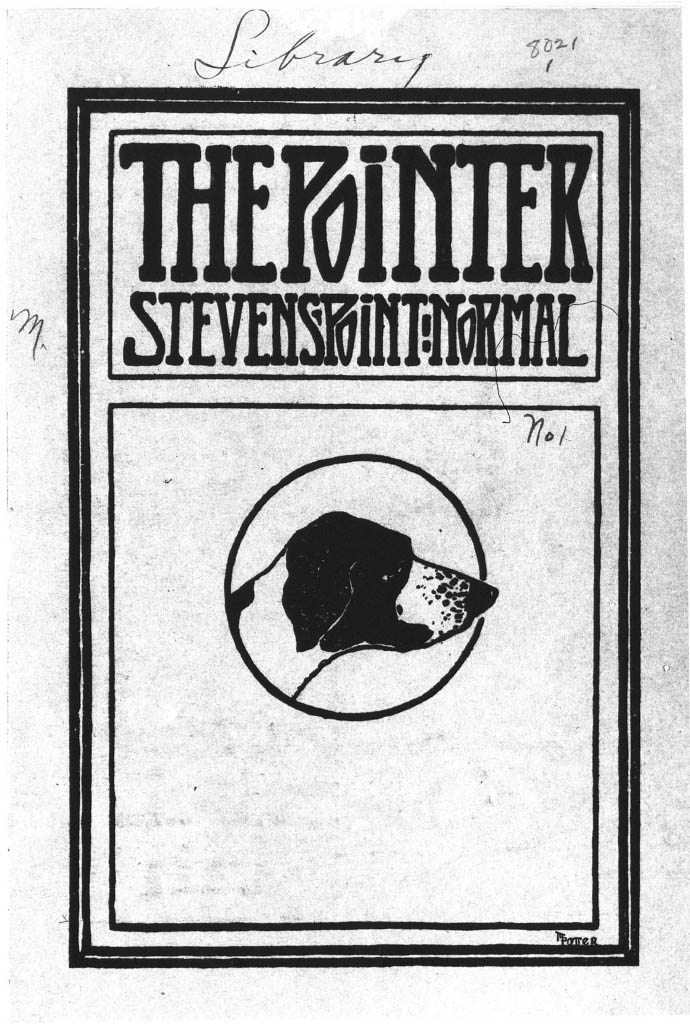
The first use of a "Pointer" Mascot in 1916

Sport	Titles	Assoc.	Division	Year	Opponent	Score
Basketball (men's)	4	NCAA	Division III	2004	Williams	84–82
Basketball (men's)	4	NCAA	Division III	2005	Rochester	73–49
Basketball (men's)	4	NCAA	Division III	2010	Williams	78–73
Basketball (men's)	4	NCAA	Division III	2015	Augustana (IL)	70–54
Basketball (women's)	2	NCAA	Division III	1987	Concordia Moorhead	81–74
Basketball (women's)	2	NCAA	Division III	2002	St. Lawrence	67–65
Ice hockey (men's)	6	NCAA	Division III	1989	RIT	3–3, 3–2
Ice hockey (men's)	6	NCAA	Division III	1990	Plattsburgh State	10–1, 3–6, 1–0
Ice hockey (men's)	6	NCAA	Division III	1991	Mankato State	6–2
Ice hockey (men's)	6	NCAA	Division III	1993	Wisconsin–River Falls	4–3 (OT)
Ice hockey (men's)	6	NCAA	Division III	2016	St. Norbert	5–1
Ice hockey (men's)	6	NCAA	Division III	2019	Norwich	3–2 (OT)
Softball	1	NCAA	Division III	1998	Chapman	3–1

== Notable athletes ==
- Kirk Baumgartner, football player
- J. P. Feyereisen, baseball player
- Ted Fritsch, football player
- Clint Kriewaldt, football player
- Scott May, baseball player
- Blaine Mueller, basketball coach
- Terry Porter, basketball player and coach
- Barry Rose, football player
- Brad Soderberg, basketball coach
- Jordan Zimmermann, baseball player
