= Cam Ellsworth =

Canadian ice hockey coach

Current position
- Title: Head Coach
- Team: Norwich
- Conference: NEHC

Biographical details
- Born: July 8, 1980 (age 46); Leamington, Ontario, Canada
- Education: Michigan Technological University

Playing career
- 2001–2005: Michigan Tech
- 2005–2006: Augusta Lynx
- 2005–2006: Greenville Grrrowl
- 2006–2008: Stockton Thunder
- 2007–2008: Pensacola Ice Pilots
- Position: Goaltender

Coaching career (HC unless noted)
- 2008–2011: Sioux City Musketeers (asst.)
- 2011–2018: Massachusetts–Lowell (asst.)
- 2018–Present: Norwich

Head coaching record
- Overall: 66–14–10 (.789)
- Tournaments: 2–1 (.667)

Accomplishments and honors

Championships
- 2019 NEHC tournament champion 2020 NEHC champion 2020 NEHC tournament champion

Awards
- 2020 Edward Jeremiah Award

Cam Ellsworth is a Canadian ice hockey coach and former player who was the NCAA Division III coach of the year in 2020.

== Career ==
After a very successful junior career with the Soo Indians, Ellsworth joined the program at Michigan Tech. He arrived during the team's dark age when the Huskies were routinely finishing near the bottom of the conference standings. As a result, his four years as a starter ended with an abysmal record of 27–72–10. He did, however, set program records for both games played (117) and saves (3,510). Even with the poor results, Ellsworth performed well enough in goal to embark on a professional career after graduating with a degree in business administration. Over the course of three years, Ellsworth played for four teams in the ECHL, producing decent results at times. He retired as a player in 2008.

Following his playing career, Ellsworth moved behind the bench as an assistant coach for the Sioux City Musketeers. He worked with the club for three seasons before returning to the college ranks. During his 7-year stint with Massachusetts–Lowell, Ellsworth helped the team reach the Frozen Four for the first time in program history while also receiving an MBA.

Upon the retirement of long-time Norwich head coach, Mike McShane in 2018, Ellsworth was named as the successor. In his first year behind the bench, Ellsworth led the team to the national championship game, falling to an undefeated Wisconsin–Stevens Point team. The next year, the Cadets' starter, Tom Aubrun, produced one of the most stunning performances by allowing 21 goals in 27 games and setting several NCAA records including 13 shutouts. Norwich was the #2 team entering the NCAA Tournament and a heavy favorite with Aubrun not having allowed a goal in over 9 games. Unfortunately, the COVID-19 pandemic prevented the team from getting a shot at the national title. Despite the cancellation of the tournament, Ellsworth was named as the national coach of the year.

== Statistics ==
=== Regular season and playoffs ===
			Regular Season									Playoffs
Season	Team	League	GP	W	L	T/OT	MIN	GA	SO	GAA	SV%	GP	W	L	MIN	GA	SO	GAA	SV%
1998–99	Oakville Blades	OPJHL	23	-	-	-	-	-	-	-	-	-	-	-	-	-	-	-	-
1999–00	Soo Indians	NAHL	46	29	11	5	2587	96	2	.916	2.23	3	0	2	-	-	0	.855	4.19
2000–01	Soo Indians	NAHL	41	32	9	0	-	-	-	.916	2.11	10	5	5	-	-	-	.923	2.66
2001–02	Michigan Tech	WCHA	28	5	19	2	1492	114	0	.866	4.58	-	-	-	-	-	-	-	-
2002–03	Michigan Tech	WCHA	35	10	21	3	2025	133	1	.893	3.94	-	-	-	-	-	-	-	-
2003–04	Michigan Tech	WCHA	24	5	14	2	1308	84	0	.888	3.85	-	-	-	-	-	-	-	-
2004–05	Michigan Tech	WCHA	30	7	18	3	1708	92	1	.916	3.23	-	-	-	-	-	-	-	-
2005–06	Augusta Lynx	ECHL	1	0	0	1	65	4	0	.900	3.70	-	-	-	-	-	-	-	-
2005–06	Greenville Grrrowl	ECHL	34	22	10	1	2001	94	4	.902	2.82	1	-	-	-	-	-	-	-
2006–07	Stockton Thunder	ECHL	32	14	13	3	1835	80	1	.907	2.62	-	-	-	-	-	-	-	-
2007–08	Stockton Thunder	ECHL	9	3	5	0	477	30	0	.885	3.77	-	-	-	-	-	-	-	-
2007–08	Pensacola Ice Pilots	ECHL	37	8	26	3	2234	132	0	.895	3.55	-	-	-	-	-	-	-	-
NCAA totals			117	27	72	10	6533	423	2	.892	3.88	-	-	-	-	-	-	-	-
ECHL totals			113	47	54	8	6612	340	5	.899	3.09	1	-	-	-	-	-	-	-

== Head coaching record ==
Record table
Season	Team	Overall	Conference	Standing	Postseason
Norwich Cadets (NEHC) (2018–present)
2018–19	Norwich	23–5–3	13–4–1	2nd	NCAA National Runner-Up
2019–20	Norwich	24–2–2	16–1–1	1st	NCAA tournament cancelled
2020–21	Norwich	7–1–0	0–0–0	N/A	
2021–22	Norwich	12–6–5	9–5–4	5th	NEHC Quarterfinals
Norwich:		66–14–10	38–10–6		
Total:		66–14–10			
National champion Postseason invitational champion Conference regular season champion Conference regular season and conference tournament champion Division regular season champion Division regular season and conference tournament champion Conference tournament champion

== Awards and honors ==
Award	Year
All-WCHA Third Team	2004–05

Awards and achievements
Preceded by Tyler Krueger	Edward Jeremiah Award; 2019–20	Succeeded by Adam Krug
