= List of St. Thomas (Minnesota) Tommies men's ice hockey seasons =

This is a season-by-season list of records compiled by St. Thomas (Minnesota) in men's ice hockey.

The University of St. Thomas (Minnesota) has appeared in two NCAA Championship games in its history, losing both.

== Season-by-season results ==
Note: GP = Games played, W = Wins, L = Losses, T = Ties

| NCAA D-I Champions | NCAA Frozen Four | Conference Regular Season Champions | Conference Playoff Champions |

| Season | Conference | Regular Season (Note: Code explanation; GP—Games Played, W—Wins, L—Losses, T—Tied games, OTW—Overtime Wins, OTL—Overtime Loses, 3/SW—Win in 3 on 3 overtime or shootout, Pts—Points*) | | | | | | | | | | | | | | Conference Tournament Results | National Tournament Results |
| Season | Conference | Conference | | | | | | | | | Overall | | | | | Conference Tournament Results | National Tournament Results |
| Season | Conference | GP | W | L | T | OTW | OTL | 3/SW | Pts* | Finish | GP | W | L | T | % | Conference Tournament Results | National Tournament Results |
|---|---|---|---|---|---|---|---|---|---|---|---|---|---|---|---|---|---|
Harold Dudley (1920 — 1921)
| 1920–21 | MIAC | – | – | – | – | – | – | – | – | – | 7 | 6 | 1 | 0 | .857 | | |
Joe Brandy (1921 — 1923)
| 1921–22 | MIAC | – | – | – | – | – | – | – | – | – | 8 | 4 | 4 | 0 | .500 | | |
| 1922–23 | MIAC | – | – | – | – | – | – | – | – | T–1st | 9 | 5 | 4 | 0 | .556 | | |
Dave Hayes (1923 — 1924)
| 1923–24 | MIAC | – | – | – | – | – | – | – | – | – | 10 | 8 | 2 | 0 | .800 | | |
Bill Houle (1924 — 1925)
| 1924–25 | MIAC | – | – | – | – | – | – | – | – | – | 2 | 1 | 0 | 1 | .750 | | |
Joe Brandy (1925 — 1926)
| 1925–26 | MIAC | – | – | – | – | – | – | – | – | – | 11 | 10 | 1 | 0 | .909 | | |
Willard Faulk (1926 — 1927)
| 1926–27 | MIAC | – | – | – | – | – | – | – | – | – | 14 | 5 | 9 | 0 | .357 | | |
John O'Halloran (1927 — 1928)
| 1927–28 | MIAC | – | – | – | – | – | – | – | – | – | 12 | 4 | 5 | 3 | .458 | | |
Matt Coogan (1928 — 1930)
| 1928–29 | MIAC | – | – | – | – | – | – | – | – | – | 11 | 6 | 5 | 0 | .545 | | |
| 1929–30 | MIAC | – | – | – | – | – | – | – | – | – | 17 | 9 | 8 | 0 | .529 | | |
Frank Penas (1930 — 1932)
| 1930–31 | MIAC | – | – | – | – | – | – | – | – | – | 11 | 3 | 4 | 4 | .455 | | |
| 1931–32 | MIAC | – | – | – | – | – | – | – | – | – | 7 | 4 | 3 | 0 | .571 | | |
Joe Boland (1932 — 1933)
| 1932–33 | MIAC | – | – | – | – | – | – | – | – | – | 10 | 7 | 3 | 0 | .700 | | |
Frank Haider (1933 — 1935)
| 1933–34 | MIAC | – | – | – | – | – | – | – | – | 1st | 7 | 4 | 2 | 1 | .643 | | |
| 1934–35 | MIAC | – | – | – | – | – | – | – | – | – | 6 | 2 | 4 | 0 | .333 | | |
Frank Klingberg (1935 — 1937)
| 1935–36 | MIAC | – | – | – | – | – | – | – | – | – | 11 | 3 | 5 | 3 | .409 | | |
| 1936–37 | MIAC | – | – | – | – | – | – | – | – | – | 14 | 9 | 5 | 0 | .643 | | |
Leo McGuire (1937 — 1939)
| 1937–38 | MIAC | – | – | – | – | – | – | – | – | T–1st | 12 | 9 | 2 | 1 | .792 | | |
| 1938–39 | MIAC | – | – | – | – | – | – | – | – | – | 10 | 4 | 5 | 1 | .450 | | |
Wee Walsh (1939 — 1942)
| 1939–40 | MIAC | – | – | – | – | – | – | – | – | 1st | 8 | 5 | 1 | 2 | .750 | | |
| 1940–41 | MIAC | – | – | – | – | – | – | – | – | 1st | 9 | 6 | 2 | 1 | .722 | | |
| 1941–42 | MIAC | – | – | – | – | – | – | – | – | 1st | 7 | 7 | 0 | 0 | 1.000 | | |
Program suspended due to World War II
Tom Cunningham (1946 — 1948)
| 1946–47 | MIAC | – | – | – | – | – | – | – | – | 1st | 18 | 14 | 4 | 0 | .778 | | |
| 1947–48 | MIAC | – | – | – | – | – | – | – | – | – | 11 | 6 | 5 | 0 | .545 | | |
Bill Funk (1948 — 1951)
| 1948–49 | MIAC | – | – | – | – | – | – | – | – | 1st | 16 | 11 | 4 | 1 | .719 | | |
| 1949–50 | MIAC | – | – | – | – | – | – | – | – | – | 13 | 9 | 4 | 0 | .692 | | |
| 1950–51 | MIAC | – | – | – | – | – | – | – | – | T–1st | 16 | 12 | 3 | 1 | .781 | | |
Norm Robertson (1951 — 1952)
| 1951–52 | MIAC | – | – | – | – | – | – | – | – | 1st | 10 | 7 | 3 | 0 | .769 | | |
Bill Funk (1952 — 1955)
| 1952–53 | MIAC | – | – | – | – | – | – | – | – | T–1st | 15 | 12 | 3 | 0 | .800 | | |
| 1953–54 | MIAC | – | – | – | – | – | – | – | – | – | 19 | 8 | 2 | 9 | .658 | | |
| 1954–55 | MIAC | – | – | – | – | – | – | – | – | – | 17 | 14 | 3 | 0 | .824 | | |
Ken Staples (1955 — 1959)
| 1955–56 | MIAC | – | – | – | – | – | – | – | – | – | 14 | 6 | 8 | 0 | .429 | | |
| 1956–57 | MIAC | – | – | – | – | – | – | – | – | – | 12 | 9 | 3 | 0 | .750 | | |
| 1957–58 | MIAC | – | – | – | – | – | – | – | – | – | 17 | 13 | 4 | 0 | .765 | | |
| 1958–59 | MIAC | – | – | – | – | – | – | – | – | – | 14 | 10 | 4 | 0 | .714 | | |
Don Saatzer (1959 — 1962)
| 1959–60 | MIAC | 7 | 5 | 2 | 0 | – | – | – | .714 | 3rd | 10 | 7 | 3 | 0 | .700 | | |
| 1960–61 | MIAC | – | – | – | – | – | – | – | – | – | 10 | 6 | 4 | 0 | .600 | | |
| 1961–62 | MIAC | – | – | – | – | – | – | – | – | – | 13 | 6 | 7 | 0 | .462 | | |
Tom Martinson (1962 — 1963)
| 1962–63 | MIAC | – | – | – | – | – | – | – | – | – | 16 | 11 | 4 | 1 | .719 | | |
Joe Flood (1963 — 1970)
| 1963–64 | MIAC | – | – | – | – | – | – | – | – | – | 11 | 4 | 6 | 1 | .409 | | |
College Division
| 1964–65 | MIAC | – | – | – | – | – | – | – | – | – | 16 | 12 | 4 | 0 | .750 | | |
| 1965–66 | MIAC | – | – | – | – | – | – | – | – | – | 16 | 8 | 8 | 0 | .500 | | |
| 1966–67 | MIAC | 14 | 7 | 7 | 0 | – | – | – | 14 | 5th | 17 | 10 | 6 | 1 | .618 | | |
| 1967–68 | MIAC | 12 | 4 | 8 | 0 | – | – | – | .333 | 5th | 18 | 7 | 11 | 0 | .389 | | |
| 1968–69 | MIAC | 14 | 3 | 11 | 0 | – | – | – | 6 | 7th | 18 | 8 | 9 | 1 | .472 | | |
| 1969–70 | MIAC | – | – | – | – | – | – | – | – | – | 18 | 8 | 9 | 1 | .472 | | |
Gus Schwartz (1970 — 1982)
| 1970–71 | MIAC | – | – | – | – | – | – | – | – | – | 20 | 7 | 12 | 1 | .375 | | |
| 1971–72 | MIAC | 14 | 10 | 4 | 0 | – | – | – | 20 | 3rd | 22 | 12 | 10 | 0 | .545 | | |
| 1972–73 | MIAC | 14 | 7 | 7 | 0 | – | – | – | 14 | T–4th | 22 | 9 | 12 | 1 | .432 | | |
Division II
| 1973–74 | MIAC | – | – | – | – | – | – | – | – | 1st | 24 | 18 | 6 | 0 | .750 | | |
| 1974–75 | MIAC | – | – | – | – | – | – | – | – | – | 27 | 19 | 8 | 0 | .704 | | |
| 1975–76 | MIAC | – | – | – | – | – | – | – | – | – | 24 | 14 | 9 | 1 | .604 | | |
| 1976–77 | MIAC | – | – | – | – | – | – | – | – | – | 24 | 8 | 16 | 0 | .333 | | |
| 1977–78 | MIAC | – | – | – | – | – | – | – | – | – | 30 | 16 | 13 | 1 | .550 | | |
| 1978–79 | MIAC | – | – | – | – | – | – | – | – | – | 27 | 10 | 17 | 0 | .370 | | |
| 1979–80 | MIAC | 16 | 10 | 5 | 1 | – | – | – | 21 | 3rd | 28 | 14 | 13 | 1 | .518 | | |
| 1980–81 | MIAC | 16 | 9 | 7 | 0 | – | – | – | 18 | 4th | 30 | 15 | 15 | 0 | .500 | | |
| 1981–82 | MIAC | 16 | 4 | 12 | 0 | – | – | – | 8 | 7th | 27 | 8 | 19 | 0 | .296 | | |
Terry Abram (1982 — 1987)
| 1982–83 | MIAC | 16 | 14 | 2 | 0 | – | – | – | 28 | 1st | 28 | 19 | 9 | 0 | .679 | | |
| 1983–84 | MIAC | 16 | 13 | 3 | 0 | – | – | – | 26 | 2nd | 31 | 20 | 10 | 1 | .661 | | Lost Quarterfinal series, 12–13 (Augsburg) |
Division III
| 1984–85 | MIAC | 16 | 14 | 2 | 0 | – | – | – | 28 | 1st | 32 | 25 | 7 | 0 | .781 | | Lost Quarterfinal series, 6–10 (RIT) |
| 1985–86 | MIAC | 16 | 15 | 1 | 0 | – | – | – | 30 | 1st | 32 | 25 | 6 | 1 | .797 | Won Semifinal series, 11–9 (Gustavus Adolphus); Won Championship series, 19–6 (Bethel) | Lost Quarterfinal series, 1–2 (Mankato State) |
| 1986–87 | MIAC | 16 | 10 | 6 | 0 | – | – | – | 20 | 3rd | 29 | 16 | 13 | 0 | .552 | Won Semifinal series, 11–9 (Saint Mary's); Lost Championship series, 6–7 (Concordia (MN)) | |
Terry Skrypek (1987 — 2010)
| 1987–88 | MIAC | 16 | 13 | 3 | 0 | – | – | – | 26 | 2nd | 31 | 21 | 10 | 0 | .677 | Won Semifinal series, 12–7 (Gustavus Adolphus); Won Championship series, 11–7 (Saint Mary's) | Lost Quarterfinal series, 0–2 (Bemidji State) |
| 1988–89 | MIAC | 16 | 13 | 3 | 0 | – | – | – | 26 | 1st | 30 | 18 | 11 | 1 | .925 | Won Semifinal series, 9–2 (Augsburg); Lost Championship series, 5–10 (Saint Mary's) | |
| 1989–90 | MIAC | 16 | 14 | 2 | 0 | – | – | – | 28 | 1st | 28 | 19 | 8 | 1 | .696 | Won Semifinal, 5–4 (OT) (Saint Mary's); Lost Championship, 1–3 (Gustavus Adolphus) | Lost Quarterfinal series, 0–1–1 (Wisconsin–Stevens Point) |
| 1990–91 | MIAC | 16 | 13 | 1 | 2 | – | – | – | 28 | 1st | 29 | 18 | 8 | 3 | .672 | Won Semifinal, 2–1 (St. Olaf); Lost Championship, 2–7 (Gustavus Adolphus) | |
| 1991–92 | MIAC | 16 | 12 | 3 | 1 | – | – | – | 25 | 1st | 32 | 20 | 10 | 2 | .656 | Won Semifinal, 6–3 (St. Olaf); Won Championship, 6–4 (Gustavus Adolphus) | Lost Quarterfinal series, 1–2 (Wisconsin–Stevens Point) |
| 1992–93 | MIAC | 16 | 13 | 2 | 1 | – | – | – | 27 | T–1st | 27 | 18 | 8 | 1 | .685 | Won Semifinal, 10–2 (Augsburg); Lost Championship, 2–4 (Gustavus Adolphus) | |
| 1993–94 | MIAC | 16 | 11 | 2 | 3 | – | – | – | 25 | 1st | 25 | 17 | 4 | 4 | .760 | Won Semifinal, 5–2 (Augsburg); Won Championship, 8–3 (Saint John's) | Lost Quarterfinal series, 0–1–1 (Wisconsin–Superior) |
| 1994–95 | MIAC | 16 | 12 | 3 | 1 | – | – | – | 25 | 1st | 25 | 16 | 8 | 1 | .660 | Won Semifinal series, 2–0 (Gustavus Adolphus); Lost Championship series, 0–2 (Saint Mary's) | |
| 1995–96 | MIAC | 16 | 11 | 3 | 2 | – | – | – | 24 | 3rd | 29 | 18 | 9 | 2 | .655 | Won Semifinal series, 2–0 (Gustavus Adolphus); Lost Championship series, 1–2 (Saint John's) | |
| 1996–97 | MIAC | 16 | 13 | 3 | 0 | – | – | – | 26 | 2nd | 27 | 18 | 9 | 0 | .667 | Lost Semifinal series, 0–2 (Gustavus Adolphus) | |
| 1997–98 | MIAC | 16 | 12 | 3 | 1 | – | – | – | 25 | T–1st | 29 | 20 | 7 | 2 | .724 | Won Semifinal series, 1–0–1 (Gustavus Adolphus); Lost Championship series, 0–2 (Augsburg) | |
| 1998–99 | MIAC | 16 | 11 | 4 | 1 | – | – | – | 23 | 1st | 31 | 16 | 12 | 3 | .565 | Won Semifinal series, 2–0 (Augsburg); Won Championship series, 1–0–1 (Concordia (MN)) | Lost Quarterfinal series, 0–1–1 (Wisconsin–Superior) |
| 1999–00 | MIAC | 16 | 14 | 1 | 1 | – | – | – | 29 | 1st | 33 | 27 | 4 | 2 | .848 | Won Semifinal series, 2–0 (Saint John's); Lost Championship series, 1–2 (Concordia (MN)) | Won Quarterfinal series, 2–0 (Wentworth); Won Semifinal, 7–1 (Plattsburgh State); Lost Championship, 1–2 (Norwich) |
| 2000–01 | MIAC | 16 | 11 | 3 | 2 | – | – | – | 24 | 1st | 27 | 15 | 9 | 3 | .611 | Lost Semifinal series, 1–2 (Bethel) | |
| 2001–02 | MIAC | 16 | 13 | 3 | 0 | – | – | – | 26 | 1st | 28 | 22 | 6 | 0 | .786 | Won Semifinal, 5–1 (Concordia (MN)); Won Championship, 3–2 (Gustavus Adolphus) | Lost First Round, 1–2 (Wisconsin–Superior) |
| 2002–03 | MIAC | 16 | 10 | 5 | 1 | – | – | – | 21 | 2nd | 27 | 16 | 9 | 2 | .630 | Won Semifinal, 7–6 (OT) (Augsburg); Lost Championship, 3–4 (OT) (Saint John's) | |
| 2003–04 | MIAC | 16 | 13 | 2 | 1 | – | – | – | 27 | 2nd | 28 | 17 | 8 | 3 | .661 | Won Semifinal, 6–3 (Gustavus Adolphus); Won Championship, 4–3 (OT) (Saint John's) | Lost First Round, 2–3 (OT) (Wisconsin–River Falls) |
| 2004–05 | MIAC | 16 | 12 | 3 | 1 | – | – | – | 25 | 2nd | 31 | 20 | 6 | 5 | .726 | Won Semifinal, 4–3 (OT) (Bethel); Won Championship, 2–1 (Saint John's) | Won First Round, 4–1 (Saint John's); Won Quarterfinal, 3–2 (St. Norbert); Won Semifinal, 4–1 (Trinity); Lost Championship, 0–5 (Middlebury) |
| 2005–06 | MIAC | 16 | 13 | 2 | 1 | – | – | – | 27 | 1st | 27 | 17 | 9 | 1 | .648 | Won Semifinal, 5–4 (Bethel); Lost Championship, 1–5) (St. Olaf) | |
| 2006–07 | MIAC | 16 | 12 | 4 | 0 | – | – | – | 24 | 2nd | 27 | 17 | 10 | 0 | .630 | Won Semifinal, 3–1 (Augsburg); Lost Championship, 3–5 (Bethel) | |
| 2007–08 | MIAC | 16 | 11 | 4 | 1 | – | – | – | 23 | T–2nd | 29 | 20 | 7 | 2 | .724 | Won Semifinal, 3–1 (Bethel); Won Championship, 4–1 (Hamline) | Won First Round, 4–1 (Wisconsin–Stout); Lost Quarterfinal, 1–2 (OT) (St. Norbert) |
| 2008–09 | MIAC | 16 | 9 | 5 | 2 | – | – | – | 20 | 3rd | 26 | 12 | 11 | 3 | .519 | Lost Semifinal, 1–3 (Gustavus Adolphus) | |
| 2009–10 | MIAC | 16 | 8 | 6 | 2 | – | – | – | 18 | 3rd | 28 | 13 | 11 | 4 | .536 | Won Semifinal, 5–4 (OT) (Hamline); Won Championship, 2–1 (OT) (Gustavus Adolphus) | Lost First Round, 0–3 (Gustavus Adolphus) |
Jeff Boeser (2010 — 2021)
| 2010–11 | MIAC | 16 | 9 | 5 | 2 | – | – | – | 20 | 2nd | 26 | 14 | 10 | 2 | .577 | Lost Semifinal, 2–4 (Concordia (MN)) | |
| 2011–12 | MIAC | 16 | 13 | 2 | 1 | – | – | – | 27 | 1st | 26 | 18 | 6 | 2 | .731 | Lost Semifinal, 3–4 (St. Olaf) | Lost First Round, 1–3 (St. Norbert) |
| 2012–13 | MIAC | 16 | 10 | 5 | 1 | – | – | – | 21 | T–1st | 26 | 13 | 11 | 2 | .538 | Lost Semifinal, 0–1 (Gustavus Adolphus) | |
| 2013–14 | MIAC | 16 | 13 | 1 | 2 | – | – | 2 | 43 | 1st | 28 | 21 | 5 | 2 | .786 | Won Semifinal, 2–1 (St. Olaf); Won Championship, 2–1 (Gustavus Adolphus) | Lost Quarterfinal, 0–3 (Wisconsin–Stevens Point) |
| 2014–15 | MIAC | 16 | 10 | 3 | 3 | – | – | 1 | 34 | 1st | 26 | 16 | 6 | 4 | .692 | Lost Semifinal, 3–6 (Hamline) | |
| 2015–16 | MIAC | 16 | 10 | 3 | 3 | – | – | 1 | 34 | 2nd | 26 | 13 | 8 | 5 | .596 | Lost Semifinal, 1–2 (OT) (Saint John's) | |
| 2016–17 | MIAC | 16 | 11 | 3 | 2 | – | – | 1 | 36 | 1st | 27 | 14 | 8 | 5 | .611 | Won Semifinal, 2–1 (Concordia (MN)); Lost Championship, 2–3 (Augsburg) | |
| 2017–18 | MIAC | 16 | 11 | 4 | 1 | – | – | 0 | 34 | 1st | 26 | 16 | 9 | 1 | .635 | Lost Semifinal, 3–4 (OT) (Gustavus Adolphus) | |
| 2018–19 | MIAC | 16 | 8 | 3 | 5 | – | – | 2 | 31 | T–3rd | 26 | 14 | 7 | 5 | .635 | Lost Semifinal, 1–4 (Saint John's) | |
| 2019–20 | MIAC | 16 | 9 | 6 | 1 | – | – | 0 | 28 | 4th | 28 | 15 | 10 | 3 | .589 | Won First Round, 3–2 (Gustavus Adolphus); Won Semifinal, 4–1 (Saint John's); Won Championship, 3–2 (Concordia (MN)) | Tournament Cancelled |
| 2020–21 | MIAC | 3 | 2 | 0 | 1 | – | – | – | .833 | 2nd | 9 | 6 | 1 | 2 | .778 | No Tournament Held | |
Division I
Enrico Blasi (2021 — Present)
| 2021–22 | CCHA | 26 | 3 | 22 | 1 | 0 | 4 | 0 | 14 | 8th | 36 | 3 | 32 | 1 | .097 | Lost Quarterfinal series, 0–2 (Minnesota State) | |
| 2022–23 | CCHA | 26 | 10 | 14 | 2 | 1 | 1 | 0 | 32 | 7th | 36 | 11 | 23 | 2 | .333 | Lost Quarterfinal series, 0–2 (Michigan Tech) | |
| 2023–24 | CCHA | 24 | 12 | 11 | 1 | 0 | 2 | 0 | 39 | T–2nd | 37 | 15 | 20 | 2 | .432 | Lost Quarterfinal series, 1–2 (Lake Superior State) | |
| 2024–25 | CCHA | 24 | 13 | 9 | 4 | 1 | 1 | 1 | .564 | 3rd | 38 | 19 | 14 | 5 | .566 | Won Quarterfinal series, 2–0 (Ferris State); Won Semifinal, 3–1 (Bowling Green); Lost Championship, 2–4 (Minnesota State) | |
| 2025–26 | CCHA | 26 | 15 | 7 | 4 | 2 | 1 | 2 | 50 | T-2nd | 38 | 21 | 12 | 5 | .618 | Won Quarterfinal series, 2–0 (Lake Superior State); Won Semifinal, 2–1 (Augustana); Lost Championship, 1–4 (Minnesota State) | |
| Totals | | | | | | | | | | | GP | W | L | T | % | Championships | |
| Regular Season | | | | | | | | | | | 1974 | 1145 | 697 | 122 | .615 | 34 MIAC Championships | |
| Conference Post-season | | | | | | | | | | | 93 | 63 | 38 | 2 | .621 | 12 MIAC Tournament Championships | |
| NCAA Post-season | | | | | | | | | | | 33 | 9 | 20 | 4 | .333 | 17 NCAA Tournament appearances | |
| Regular Season and Post-season Record | | | | | | | | | | | 2100 | 1217 | 755 | 128 | .610 | | |

* Winning percentage is used when conference schedules are unbalanced.
