= Tom Aubrun =

French ice hockey player (born 1995)

- Born: July 8, 1995 (age 31) Chamonix, France
- Height: 6 ft 0 in (183 cm)
- Weight: 174 lb (79 kg; 12 st 6 lb)
- Position: Goaltender
- Catches: Left
- Ligue Magnus team Former teams: Pionniers de Chamonix Mont-Blanc; Rockford IceHogs; Indy Fuel; Knoxville Ice Bears; Macon Mayhem; Roanoke Rail Yard Dawgs; Pensacola Ice Flyers
- NHL draft: Undrafted
- Playing career: 2020–present

Tom Aubrun is a French professional ice hockey goaltender who currently plays for the Pionniers de Chamonix Mont-Blanc in the Ligue Magnus. He is the all-time NCAA record holder for consecutive shutouts.

== Playing career ==
Aubrun spent most of his junior career playing for Rouen at various levels, but also made two appearances for the French national team at the World Junior Championships. He helped the U18 French team stave off relegation in 2013 and then turned in a one-game sub-par performance at the U20 tournament in 2014 but still managed to earn a bronze medal for the Division I B level.

Aubrun joined a powerhouse Division III program at Norwich in 2016. He played one period for the Cadets, stopping all three shots he faced, and was part of Mike McShane's 4th and final D-III championship. As a sophomore Aubrun started 9 games for Norwich as the primary backup and helped the team win its conference championship. Norwich fell to Hobart in the conference tournament and narrowly missed earning an at-large bid into the NCAA Tournament.

Beginning with his junior year, Aubrun was the starter and also began playing for a new head coach when Cam Ellsworth succeeded McShane. Aubrun was the star of the team, allowing 45 goals in 28 games as Norwich finished 2nd in the conference but won the tournament and earned an automatic bid to the 2019 NCAA Tournament. Aubrun backstopped Norwich to the championship game and kept the team in the contest against undefeated Wisconsin–Stevens Point but ultimately fell in overtime.

For his senior season, Aubrun began the season at a tremendous pace, earning shutouts in five of the first six games. After surrendering 3 goals to Massachusetts–Boston he came back to earth but continued to pile up wins as Norwich led the Division III national rankings. Beginning on January 25, Aubrun started another shutout streak and refused to allow anyone to score. In a stretch that included two nationally ranked teams, Aubrun broke the Division III NCAA record with his fifth consecutive shutout. A day later he recorded his sixth consecutive shoutout and surpassed Blaine Lacher as the all-time leader at any level of NCAA play. Even when the NEHC Tournament began Aubrun continued to refuse entry into his net and won all three games without surrendering a goal. His shutout streak ended only when the NCAA cancelled the 2020 Tournament due to the coronavirus pandemic. Aubrun's final record was 9 full games and 572:31 in game time.

Shortly after his college career was over, Aubrun received the Sid Watson Award as the national Division III player of the year. He then became just the third Norwich player in history to earn an AHL contract after finishing his college career when he signed with the Rockford IceHogs. Aubrun was in such rarified air during the season that he hired an agent around Christmas, which he was able to do as a non-scholarship player.

Medal record

Representing France

Ice hockey

World Junior Championships
Bronze medal – third place	2014 Great Britain	France

== Career statistics ==
=== Regular season and playoffs ===
			Regular season									Playoffs
Season	Team	League	GP	W	L	T	MIN	GA	SO	GAA	SV%	GP	W	L	MIN	GA	SO	GAA	SV%
2015–16	Rochester Jr. Americans	USPHL	39	12	19	0	1811	109	0	3.61	.911	3	1	2	179	7	0	2.33	.942
2016–17	Norwich University	NEHC	1	0	0	0	20	0	0	0.00	1.000	—	—	—	—	—	—	—	—
2017–18	Norwich University	NEHC	9	7	2	0	532	14	1	1.58	.934	—	—	—	—	—	—	—	—
2018–19	Norwich University	NEHC	28	20	4	3	1588	45	6	1.70	.929	—	—	—	—	—	—	—	—
2019–20	Norwich University	NEHC	27	23	2	2	1629	21	13	0.77	.967	—	—	—	—	—	—	—	—
2020–21	Indy Fuel	ECHL	10	4	5	1	564	37	0	3.94	.876	—	—	—	—	—	—	—	—
2020–21	Rockford IceHogs	AHL	3	0	2	0	148	11	0	4.46	.864	—	—	—	—	—	—	—	—
2021–22	Indy Fuel	ECHL	7	1	3	1	370	25	0	4.06	.853	—	—	—	—	—	—	—	—
2022–23	Knoxville Ice Bears	SPHL	1	0	1	0	59	4	0	4.06	.902	—	—	—	—	—	—	—	—
2022–23	Macon Mayhem	SPHL	7	1	4	0	350	25	0	4.29	.870	—	—	—	—	—	—	—	—
2022–23	Roanoke Rail Yard Dawgs	SPHL	7	2	4	0	359	15	1	2.50	.910	—	—	—	—	—	—	—	—
2022–23	Pensacola Ice Flyers	SPHL	1	—	—	—	19	1	0	3.09	.800	—	—	—	—	—	—	—	—
2023–24	Chamonix Mont-Blanc	Ligue Magnus	37	15	15	3	2102	107	2	2.89	.915	—	—	—	—	—	—	—	—
AHL totals			3	0	2	0	148	11	0	4.46	.864	—	—	—	—	—	—	—	—

== Awards and honors ==
Award	Year
NEHC All-Tournament Team	2018; 2019; 2020
All-NEHC First Team	2018–19; 2019–20
ACHA Division III Third Team All-American	2018–19
NEHC Goaltender of the Year	2018–19; 2019–20
NEHC Player of the Year	2018–19; 2019–20
ACHA Division III First Team All-American	2019–20
USCHO Division III Player of the Year	2019–20

Awards and achievements
Preceded by Devin McDonald	Sid Watson Award; 2020	Succeeded by Peter Bates
