= Tyler Krueger =

American ice hockey coach

Current position
- Title: Head Coach
- Team: Wisconsin–Stevens Point
- Conference: WIAC

Biographical details
- Born: May 23, 1990 (age 36); Stevens Point, Wisconsin, USA
- Education: University of Wisconsin–Stevens Point

Playing career
- 2010–2014: Wisconsin–Stevens Point
- Position: Defenseman

Coaching career (HC unless noted)
- 2015–2017: Wisconsin–Stevens Point (asst.)
- 2017–Present: Wisconsin–Stevens Point

Head coaching record
- Overall: 96–23–10 (.783)
- Tournaments: 4–1 (.800)

Accomplishments and honors

Championships
- 2018 WIAC champion 2019 WIAC champion 2019 WIAC tournament champion 2019 NCAA National Champion; 2020 WIAC champion 2022 WIAC champion

Awards
- 2019 Edward Jeremiah Award

Records
- Fewest losses, one season (0)

Tyler Krueger is an American ice hockey coach and former player who was the NCAA Division III coach of the year in 2019.

== Career ==
A native of Stevens Point, Wisconsin, Krueger's college career began in 2010 at his home-town university. He played four years for the team, helping the program return to prominence with an NCAA tournament bid in his senior season, the first for the pointers in 16 years. After graduating, Krueger took a year off before returning to his alma mater as an assistant coach. His appointment coincided with the Pointers winning the 5th national championship in program history.

After two years as an assistant, Krueger was promoted to interim head coach after Chris Brooks left for a Division I job. The team responded to their new coach with an appearance in the National Semifinal, leading the administration to hire Krueger on full-time. The very next season, Krueger led Wisconsin–Stevens Point to the first undefeated season in the history of Division III hockey and was named as the national coach of the year.

== Statistics ==
=== Regular season and playoffs ===
			Regular Season					Playoffs
Season	Team	League	GP	G	A	Pts	PIM	GP	G	A	Pts	PIM
2008–09	Alaska Avalanche	NAHL	19	0	2	2	6	—	—	—	—	—
2008–09	Burnaby Express	BCHL	2	0	0	0	0	—	—	—	—	—
2010–11	Wisconsin–Stevens Point	NCHA	8	0	1	1	4	—	—	—	—	—
2011–12	Wisconsin–Stevens Point	NCHA	21	0	3	3	14	—	—	—	—	—
2012–13	Wisconsin–Stevens Point	NCHA	21	1	5	6	8	—	—	—	—	—
2013–14	Wisconsin–Stevens Point	WIAC	26	0	5	5	12	—	—	—	—	—
NCAA totals			76	1	14	15	38	—	—	—	—	—

== Head coaching record ==
Record table
Season	Team	Overall	Conference	Standing	Postseason
Wisconsin–Stevens Point Pointers (WIAC) (2017–present)
2017–18	Wisconsin–Stevens Point	21–6–3	6–0–2	1st	NCAA National Semifinal
2018–19	Wisconsin–Stevens Point	29–0–2	8–0–0	1st	NCAA National Champion
2019–20	Wisconsin–Stevens Point	18–7–3	10–2–3	T–1st	WIAC Runner-Up
2020–21	Wisconsin–Stevens Point	7–4–1	5–3–1	T–2nd	WIAC Runner-Up
2021–22	Wisconsin–Stevens Point	21–6–1	11–2–0	1st	WIAC Runner-Up
Wisconsin–Stevens Point:		96–23–10	40–7–6		
Total:		96–23–10			
National champion Postseason invitational champion Conference regular season champion Conference regular season and conference tournament champion Division regular season champion Division regular season and conference tournament champion Conference tournament champion

Awards and achievements
Preceded by Blaise MacDonald	Edward Jeremiah Award; 2018–19	Succeeded by Cam Ellsworth
