= 2019 NCAA Division III men's ice hockey tournament =

- Teams: 12
- Finals site: K.B. Willett Arena, Stevens Point, Wisconsin
- Champions: Wisconsin–Stevens Point Pointers (6th title)
- Runner-up: Norwich Cadets (6th title game)
- Semifinalists: Geneseo State Knights (3rd Frozen Four); Hobart Statesmen (3rd Frozen Four)
- Winning coach: Tyler Krueger (1st title)
- MOP: Tanner Karty (Wisconsin–Stevens Point)

The 2019 NCAA Division III Men's Ice Hockey Tournament was the culmination of the 2018–19 season, the 36th such tournament in NCAA history. It concluded with Wisconsin–Stevens Point defeating Norwich in the championship game 3-2 in overtime. All First Round and Quarterfinal matchups were held at home team venues, while all succeeding games were played at the K.B. Willett Arena in Stevens Point, Wisconsin.

Wisconsin–Stevens Point became the first Division III team to win a National Championship without losing a single game during the season.

== Qualifying teams ==
Twelve teams qualified for the tournament in the following ways: (Pool A) eight teams received bids as a result of being conference tournament champions from conferences that possessed an automatic bid, (Pool C) four additional teams received at-large bids based upon their records.

| East | | | | | | | West | | | | | | |
| Seed | School | Conference | Record | Berth Type | Appearance | Last Bid | Seed | School | Conference | Record | Berth Type | Appearance | Last Bid |
|---|---|---|---|---|---|---|---|---|---|---|---|---|---|
| 1 | Geneseo State | SUNYAC | 24–1–2 | Tournament Champion | 7th | 2018 | 1 | Wisconsin–Stevens Point | WIAC | 26–0–2 | At–Large | 15th | 2018 |
| 2 | Norwich | NEHC | 21–4–3 | Tournament Champion | 18th | 2017 | 2 | St. Norbert | NCHA | 22–4–3 | Tournament Champion | 19th | 2018 |
| 3 | Oswego State | SUNYAC | 19–6–2 | At–Large | 16th | 2017 | 3 | Augsburg | MIAC | 21–3–3 | Tournament Champion | 6th | 2018 |
| 4 | Hobart | NEHC | 19–7–2 | At–Large | 9th | 2018 | | | | | | | |
| 5 | Trinity | NESCAC | 19–3–5 | Tournament Champion | 7th | 2017 | | | | | | | |
| 6 | Massachusetts–Boston | NEHC | 19–7–1 | At–Large | 2nd | 2016 | | | | | | | |
| 7 | Manhattanville | UCHC | 17–8–5 | Tournament Champion | 5th | 2008 | | | | | | | |
| 8 | University of New England | CCC | 20–6–2 | Tournament Champion | 2nd | 2018 | | | | | | | |
| 9 | Plymouth State | MASCAC | 17–7–3 | Tournament Champion | 3rd | 2015 | | | | | | | |

== Format ==
The tournament featured four rounds of play. All rounds were Single-game elimination.

Because fewer than four western teams qualified, the tournament was arranged so that all western teams were placed into one quarterfinal bracket. The nine eastern qualifying eastern teams were arranged evenly across the remaining three quarterfinal brackets. The top three eastern seeds and the top western seed received byes into the quarterfinal round and were arranged so that the bracket containing the top overall seed would play the bracket containing the third eastern seed.

The six eastern teams in the quarterfinals were arranged so that the fourth- and ninth-seeded teams would play with the winner advancing to play the third eastern seed, the fifth- and eighth-seeded teams would play with the winner advancing to play the second eastern seed and the sixth- and seventh-seeded teams would play with the winner advancing to play the first eastern seed. The second and third western teams would play in the first round with the winner advancing to face the top western seed.

In the First Round and Quarterfinals the higher-seeded team served as host.

== Tournament Bracket ==
First Round; March 9
W2 | St. Norbert | 4*
W3 | Augsburg | 3
E4 | Hobart | 2
E9 | Plymouth State | 1
E6 | Massachusetts–Boston | 4
E7 | Manhattanville | 6
E5 | Trinity | 1
E8 | University of New England | 2

Quarterfinals; March 16
W1 | Wisconsin–Stevens Point | 3
W2 | St. Norbert | 0
E3 | Oswego State | 2
E4 | Hobart | 3
E1 | Geneseo State | 8
E7 | Manhattanville | 2
E2 | Norwich | 2
E8 | University of New England | 1

Semifinals; March 22
W1 | Wisconsin–Stevens Point | 5
E4 | Hobart | 3
E1 | Geneseo State | 2
E2 | Norwich | 4

National Championship; March 23
W1 | Wisconsin–Stevens Point | 3*
E2 | Norwich | 2

Note: * denotes overtime period(s)

== Results ==
=== First round ===
| March 9, 2019; 7:06 PM | (W2) St. Norbert | 4 – 3 (OT) (0–0, 1–0, 2–3, 1–0) | (W3) Augsburg | Cornerstone Community Center – Ashwaubenon, Wisconsin; Attendance: 1,593 |

Game reference

T.J. Black
Goalies
Nick Schmit
Referees:
Tony Lancette
Jason Swenson
Linesmen:
Pat Courtney
Joe Guzzardi

| (Sacco) Roman Uchyn (14) – 31:57 | 1–0 |
| | 1–1 | 43:58 – Tommy Carey (10) (Madry, Rodriguez) |
| | 1–2 | 48:03 – Eric Brenk (8) (Dollimer, Dietsch) |
| | 1–3 | 52:27 – Jason Krych (2) (Gillett, Dietsch) |
| (Andrews, Uchyn) Riley Christensen (19) – PP – 54:56 | 2–3 |
| (Pung, Sacco) Roman Uchyn (15) – 58:49 | 3–3 |
| (Uchyn, Pung) Dominick Sacco (12) – 62:19 | 4–3 |

6 min
Penalties
10 min
40
Shots
22

| March 9, 2019; 7:00 PM | (E4) Hobart | 2 – 1 (0–1, 1–0, 1–0) | (E9) Plymouth State | Geneva Recreation Complex – Geneva, New York; Attendance: 629 |

Game reference

Liam Lascelle
Goalies
Evan Morelli
Referees:
Derek Sylvester
Andrew Spinali
Linesmen:
Jordan Pararino
Mark McGinnis

| | 0–1 | 05:48 – Ryan Stevens (12) (Volonnino) |
| (Sliney, Robitaille) Julien Denicourt (6) – 32:13 (Volonnino) | 1–1 |
| (Denicourt) Alec Robitaille (1) – 48:22 | 2–1 |

8 min
Penalties
12 min
40
Shots
14

| March 9, 2019; 7:00 PM | (E6) Massachusetts–Boston | 4 – 6 (2–2, 1–1, 1–3) | (E7) Manhattanville | Edward T. Barry Ice Rink – Boston, Massachusetts; Attendance: 1,109 |

Game reference

Bailey MacBurnie
Goalies
Tyler Feaver
Referees:
Chris Shepley
Mike Baker
Linesmen:
David St. Lawrence
Nick Payeur

| Stevie Bryant (4) – 07:26 | 1–0 |
| | 1–1 | 10:03 – Casper Dyrssen (7) (Ferraro, Slade) |
| | 1–2 | 16:25 – PP – Bryan Platt (4) (Anderson, Walltott) |
| (Heldt) Jeffrey Skinner (6) – 19:37 | 2–2 |
| | 2–3 | 22:05 – PP – Matt Lippa (18) (Arfelt, Ferraro) |
| Chris Peters (9) – 37:26 | 3–3 |
| (Nachbaur) Chris Peters (10) – 49:41 | 4–3 |
| | 4–4 | 54:10 – Matt Lippa (19) (McLean, Ferraro) |
| | 4–5 | 58:56 – Matt Lippa (20) (Knight, Berglund) |
| | 4–6 | 59:45 – EN – Nigel Slade (5) |

10 min
Penalties
8 min
40
Shots
25

| March 9, 2019; 7:00 PM | (E5) Trinity | 1 – 2 (0–0, 0–2, 1–0) | (E8) University of New England | Koeppel Community Center – Hartford, Connecticut; Attendance: 910 |

Game reference

Tedy Loughborough
Goalies
Ben Churchfield
Referees:
Eric Doyle
Anthony Kenney
Linesmen:
Mike St. Lawrence
Matt Fitzgibbons

| | 0–1 | 26:55 – Ryan Bloom (22) (Fleurent, Seltenreich) |
| | 0–2 | 39:45 – Tyler Seltenreich (14) (Fleurent, Bloom) |
| (Feeney) Taggart Corriveau (11) – 49:34 | 1–2 |

6 min
Penalties
4 min
44
Shots
30

=== Quarterfinals ===
| March 16, 2019; 7:00 PM | (W1) Wisconsin–Stevens Point | 3 – 0 (1–0, 2–0, 0–0) | (W2) St. Norbert | K.B. Willett Ice Arena – Stevens Point, Wisconsin; Attendance: 1,850 |

Game reference

Connor Ryckman
Goalies
T.J. Black
Referees:
Josh Hatinger
Michael Elam
Linesmen:
Taylor Vichorek
Eric Thom

| (Roo, Allemon) Kelly O'Brien (5) – 16:24 | 1–0 |
| (Zech, O'Brien) Tanner Karty (10) – 23:46 | 2–0 |
| (McLean, Kiraly) T.J. Roo (7) – 37:57 | 3–0 |

8 min
Penalties
9 min
35
Shots
17

| March 16, 2019; 7:00 PM | (E3) Oswego State | 2 – 3 (1–1, 0–2, 1–0) | (E4) Hobart | Campus Center Ice Arena – Oswego, New York; Attendance: 2,140 |

Game reference

David Richer
Goalies
Liam Lascelle
Referees:
Matt Bielak
Paul Maciejewski
Linesmen:
Rick Lembo
Anthony Perez

| | 0–1 | 14:09 – Lawson Macdougall (9) |
| (Nenadal, Campbell) Joseph Molinaro (14) – 16:20 | 1–1 |
| | 1–2 | 21:04 – PP – Ryan Lynch (9) (Denicourt, Toupal) |
| | 1–3 | 33:29 – SH – Travis Schneider (15) |
| (Gillespie, Zizek) Travis Broughman (12) – EA – 59:48 | 2–3 |

4 min
Penalties
4 min
28
Shots
15

| March 16, 2019; 7:00 PM | (E1) Geneseo State | 8 – 2 (1–1, 4–1, 3–0) | (E7) Manhattanville | Ira S. Wilson Ice Arena – Geneseo, New York; Attendance: 1,518 |

Game reference

Devin McDonald
Goalies
Tyler Feaver
Referees:
Jim Visconte
Craig Florkowski
Linesmen:
Ryan Bradshaw
Matt Fox

| | 0–1 | 07:05 – Marco Ferraro (9) (Anderson, Feaver) |
| (Keenan, Ferguson) Andrew Romano (9) – PP – 08:09 | 1–1 |
| (Romano, Ferguson) David Szmyd (11) – 20:21 | 2–1 |
| | 2–2 | 20:58 – Matt Lippa (21) (Berglund) |
| (Romano, Szmyd) Conlan Keenan (22) – 27:11 | 3–2 |
| (Burnett) Henry Cleghorn (4) – 34:26 | 4–2 |
| (Miller, Ferguson) Ryan Burnett (5) – 38:17 | 5–2 |
| (Serpico, Kelley) Dan Bosio (8) – 53:13 | 6–2 |
| (Cleghorn, Ferguson) Brendan Miller (6) – EN – 56:55 | 7–2 |
| (Empey) Anthony Marra (13) – 57:29 | 8–2 |

10 min
Penalties
10 min
42
Shots
22

| March 16, 2019; 7:00 PM | (E2) Norwich | 2 – 1 (OT) (1–1, 0–0, 0–0, 1–0) | (E8) University of New England | Kreitzberg Arena – Northfield, Vermont; Attendance: 1,923 |

Game reference

Tom Aubrun
Goalies
Ben Churchfield
Referees:
Steve Benoit
Eric Doyle
Linesmen:
Rick Urnek
Tom Thibodeau

| | 0–1 | 04:07 – Brendan Donohue (9) (Roo, Allemon) |
| (Swanson, Erickson) Coby Downs (6) – 13:41 | 1–1 |
| Félix Brassard (11) – 62:46 | 2–1 |

0 min
Penalties
4 min
41
Shots
28

=== Semifinals ===
| March 22, 2019; 7:00 PM | (W1) Wisconsin–Stevens Point | 5 – 3 (2–1, 2–2, 1–0) | (E4) Hobart | K.B. Willett Ice Arena – Stevens Point, Wisconsin; Attendance: 1,678 |

Game reference

Connor Ryckman
Goalies
Alex Connal
Referees:
Mike Baker
Mike Elam
Linesmen:
Taylor Vichorek
Eric Thom

| (Kiraly, McLean) Luke McElhenie (10) – 00:46 | 1–0 |
| | 1–1 | 10:14 – Blake Coffey (3) |
| (Karty, Bittner) Zach Zech (10) – 17:51 | 2–1 |
| (McLean, Kiraly) Colin Raver (13) – 29:06 | 3–1 |
| | 3–2 | 33:38 – PP – Travis Schneider (16) (Macnee, Schultz) |
| | 3–3 | 34:16 – PP – Zach Tyson (7) (Maguyon, Macnee) |
| (O'Brien, McLean) Tanner Karty (12) – 34:55 | 4–3 |
| (Duffin) Austin Kelly (8) – EN – 59:00 | 5–3 |

4 min
Penalties
2 min
35
Shots
26

| March 22, 2019; 7:00 PM | (E1) Geneseo State | 2 – 4 (0–0, 0–2, 2–2) | (E2) Norwich | K.B. Willett Ice Arena – Stevens Point, Wisconsin; Attendance: 1,000 |

Game reference

Devin McDonald
Goalies
Tom Aubrun
Referees:
Derek Sylvester
Steve Benoit
Linesmen:
Joseph Guzzardi
Shane Dillon

| | 0–1 | 26:30 – PP – Brett Ouderkirk (15) (Borduas, Brassard) |
| | 0–2 | 33:45 – Coby Downs (7) (Swanson, Dockery) |
| | 0–3 | 44:17 – PP – Maxime Borduas (8) (Ouderkirk, Downs) |
| (Empey, Burnett) Henry Cleghorn (5) – 45:59 | 1–3 |
| (Bosio, Serpico) Carson Kelley (5) – 47:00 | 2–3 |
| | 2–4 | 59:31 – EN – Dave Robertson (4) |

6 min
Penalties
8 min
20
Shots
24

=== National Championship ===
| March 23, 2019; 7:00 PM | (W1) Wisconsin–Stevens Point | 3 – 2 (OT) (0–0, 0–0, 2–2, 1–0) | (E2) Norwich | K.B. Willett Ice Arena – Stevens Point, Wisconsin; Attendance: 1,419 |

Game reference

Connor Ryckman
Goalies
Tom Aubrun
Referees:
Mike Elam
Steve Benoit
Linesmen:
Eric Thom
Shane Dillon

| (Kiraly, Mackellar) Jordan Fader (7) – 43:31 | 1–0 |
| (Zech, Beauvais) Colin Raver (14) – 44:34 | 2–0 |
| | 2–1 | 47:01 – Coby Downs (8) (Chicoine) |
| | 2–2 | 52:15 – Coby Downs (9) (Williams, Robertson) |
| (Raver) Steven Quagliata (9) – 75:13 | 3–2 |

6 min
Penalties
6 min
45
Shots
28

== All-Tournament Team ==
- G: Connor Ryckman (Wisconsin–Stevens Point)
- D: Danny Kiraly (Wisconsin–Stevens Point)
- D: David Robertson (Norwich)
- F: Tanner Karty* (Wisconsin–Stevens Point)
- F: Colin Raver (Wisconsin–Stevens Point)
- F: Coby Downs (Norwich)

* Most Outstanding Player(s)

== Record by conference ==
| Conference | # of Bids | Record | Win % | Frozen Four | Championship Game | Champions |
|---|---|---|---|---|---|---|
| NEHC | 3 | 4–3 | .571 | 2 | 1 | - |
| SUNYAC | 2 | 1–2 | .333 | 1 | - | - |
| WIAC | 1 | 3–0 | 1.000 | 1 | 1 | 1 |
| NCHA | 1 | 1–1 | .500 | - | - | - |
| CCC | 1 | 1–1 | .500 | - | - | - |
| UCHC | 1 | 1–1 | .500 | - | - | - |
| NESCAC | 1 | 0–1 | .000 | - | - | - |
| MIAC | 1 | 0–1 | .000 | - | - | - |
| MASCAC | 1 | 0–1 | .000 | - | - | - |
