= Arrington Ice Arena =

Ice arena in Adrian, Michigan

- Interactive map of Arrington Ice Arena
- Location: Adrian, Michigan, United States
- Coordinates: 41°53′47″N 84°03′46″W
- Owner: Adrian College
- Capacity: 500 (hockey)
- Surface: 200' x 85'(hockey)

Construction
- Opened: 2007
- Cost: $5.5 million

Tenant
- Adrian College Bulldogs

The Arrington Ice Arena is a 500-seat ice arena located in Adrian, Michigan on the campus of Adrian College. The ice arena is also the home to a number of Adrian Bulldog Athletic teams:

- AC Men's Varsity Ice Hockey competing in NCAA DIII as a member of the Northern Collegiate Hockey Association.
- AC Women's Varsity Ice Hockey competing in NCAA DIII as a member of the Northern Collegiate Hockey Association.
- AC Men's ACHA Division 1 competing in the American Collegiate Hockey Association as a member of the Great Lakes Collegiate Hockey League.
- AC Men's ACHA Division 2 competing in the American Collegiate Hockey Association as a member of the Great Midwest Hockey League.
- AC Men's ACHA Division 3 competing in the American Collegiate Hockey Association as a member of the Michigan Collegiate Hockey Conference.
- AC Women's ACHA Division 1 competing in the American Collegiate Hockey Association as a member of the Central Collegiate Women's Hockey Association.
- AC Women's ACHA Division 2 competing in the American Collegiate Hockey Association as a member of the Central Collegiate Women's Hockey Association.
- AC Synchronized Skating Team.

== Facilities ==
The Ice Arena includes an NHL regulation-sized ice sheet and has a seating capacity of 500 spectators, a media press box, a president's seating area, concession stand, pro shop with skate rental. The arena also houses offices for ice sports coaches and personnel and locker rooms.
