= NCHA Men's Tournament =

Annual Division III conference tournament

Northern Collegiate Hockey Association Men's Tournament
- Conference hockey championship
- Sport: Ice hockey
- Conference: NCHA
- Format: Two-game aggregate, modified best of three, single-elimination
- Played: 1986–peresent
- Winner trophy: Harris Cup

The NCHA men's tournament is an annual Division III conference tournament that has taken place since 1986. The winner of the tournament has received an automatic bid to the NCAA Tournament since they were first offered in 2000.

== History ==
When the NCHA formed in 1981, the NCAA was already holding a preliminary tournament to help determine the bids for the NCAA Tournament. They continued to do so until 1985, after which the western conferences began playing their own postseason tournaments. For the first year, the NCHA tournament format was a two-game, total goal series for both rounds. That was changed to a point system the following year; the teams would play two games against one another, and whoever had the most points would advance (2 points for a win, 1 point for a tie). If the two teams were tied after two games, than a 20-minute 'mini-game' was played to determine the winner. In 1993 the tournament was expanded to include all six teams, with all rounds following the same point system format. Two seasons later the tournament was expanded again, this time to eight teams, before returning to a six-team championship the following year. In 1997, Bemidji State was no longer eligible to participate in any Division III tournament, but remained in the NCHA for three more seasons. The following year the eight-team tournament was restored. When Lake Forest left the conference in 2009, the tournament shifted to a seven-team format, but was restored to an eight-team arrangement after membership was reshuffled in 2013.

In 2016, the conference standings were altered by splitting teams into two divisions, North and South. The tournament was also changed to include only six teams, three from each division, with the top teams advancing to the semifinal round. The remaining teams would play within their division for the quarterfinals, and then the opposite divisions for the semifinals. Two years later the tournament was returned to an eight-team format; however, the teams would play both the quarterfinal and semifinal rounds within their divisions, leaving the championship as the only interdivisional game.

== 1986 ==
Seed	School	Conference record
1	Bemidji State	12–6–0
2	Mankato State	11–5–2
3	St. Scholastica	11–6–1
4	Wisconsin–River Falls	11–5–0

Semifinals; March 1–2
1	Bemidji State (OT)	5	3	8
4	Wisconsin–River Falls	4	3	7
2	Mankato State (2OT)	1	5	6
3	St. Scholastica	1	4	5

Championship; March 8–9
1	Bemidji State (OT)	6	4	10
2	Mankato State	3	6	9

== 1987 ==
Seed	School	Conference record
1	St. Cloud State	13–6–1
2	Mankato State	13–6–1
3	Bemidji State	12–7–1
4	Wisconsin–River Falls	15–5–0

Semifinals; February 28–March 1
1	St. Cloud State	4	6	2*
4	Wisconsin–River Falls	9	2	1
2	Mankato State	3	2	-
3	Bemidji State	5	4	-

Championship; March 7–8
1	St. Cloud State	6	9	-
3	Bemidji State	4	7	-

Note: * denotes overtime period(s)
Note: Mini-games in italics

== 1988 ==
Seed	School	Conference record
1	Wisconsin–River Falls	20–4–0
2	Bemidji State	15–6–3
3	Wisconsin–Stevens Point	15–7–2
4	Mankato State	14–8–2

Semifinals; February 27–28
1	Wisconsin–River Falls	3	10	-
4	Mankato State	3	3	-
2	Bemidji State	0	8	1
3	Wisconsin–Stevens Point	4	1	0

Championship; March 4–5
1	Wisconsin–River Falls	7	2	-
2	Bemidji State	4	0	-

Note: * denotes overtime period(s)
Note: Mini-games in italics

== 1989 ==
Seed	School	Conference record
1	Wisconsin–Stevens Point	23–1–0
2	Wisconsin–Eau Claire	13–8–3
3	Bemidji State	12–10–2
4	Mankato State	11–10–3

Semifinals; February 24–25
1	Wisconsin–Stevens Point	4	7	1****
4	Mankato State	7	6	0
2	Wisconsin–Eau Claire	5	4	-
3	Bemidji State	6	4*	-

Championship; March 3–4
1	Wisconsin–Stevens Point	2	2*	-
3	Bemidji State	0	2	-

Note: * denotes overtime period(s)
Note: Mini-games in italics

== 1990 ==
Seed	School	Conference record
1	Wisconsin–Stevens Point	19–2–3
2	Wisconsin–Eau Claire	15–8–1
3	Mankato State	13–9–2
4	Wisconsin–River Falls	11–10–3

Semifinals; February 23–24
1	Wisconsin–Stevens Point	8	7	-
4	Wisconsin–River Falls	1	2	-
2	Wisconsin–Eau Claire	5	4	1
3	Mankato State	5*	4*	2

Championship; March 2–3
1	Wisconsin–Stevens Point	3*	6	-
3	Mankato State	3	2	-

Note: * denotes overtime period(s)
Note: Mini-games in italics

== 1991 ==
Seed	School	Conference record
1	Mankato State	16–3–5
2	Bemidji State	17–4–3
3	Wisconsin–Stevens Point	16–8–0
4	Wisconsin–Superior	13–11–0

Semifinals; February 22–23
1	Mankato State	2	6	-
4	Wisconsin–Superior	1	3	-
2	Bemidji State	1	3	-
3	Wisconsin–Stevens Point	7	4	-

Championship; March 1–2
1	Mankato State	1	3	-
3	Wisconsin–Stevens Point	4	5	-

Note: * denotes overtime period(s)
Note: Mini-games in italics

== 1992 ==
Seed	School	Conference record
1	Wisconsin–Stevens Point	14–4–2
2	Wisconsin–Superior	14–5–1
3	Mankato State	11–7–2
4	Bemidji State	9–8–3

Semifinals; February 23–24
1	Wisconsin–Stevens Point	3	7	-
4	Bemidji State	3	1	-
2	Wisconsin–Superior	6	2	0
3	Mankato State	1	5	1

Championship; March 2–3
1	Wisconsin–Stevens Point	6	4	-
3	Mankato State	2	4	-

Note: * denotes overtime period(s)
Note: Mini-games in italics

== 1993 ==
Seed	School	Conference record	Seed	School	Conference record
1	Wisconsin–Stevens Point	17–1–2	4	Wisconsin–Superior	9–11–0
2	Bemidji State	14–6–0	5	Lake Forest	5–15–0
3	Wisconsin–River Falls	10–9–1	6	Wisconsin–Eau Claire	3–16–1

Quarterfinals; February 19–20
3	Wisconsin–River Falls	5	2	-
6	Wisconsin–Eau Claire	0	1	-
4	Wisconsin–Superior	4	3*	-
5	Lake Forest	2	3	-

Semifinals; February 26–27
1	Wisconsin–Stevens Point	7	2	2
4	Wisconsin–Superior	3	6	0
2	Bemidji State	7	7	-
3	Wisconsin–River Falls	3	0	-

Championship; March 5–6
1	Wisconsin–Stevens Point	5	3	2
3	Bemidji State	3	8	0

Note: * denotes overtime period(s)
Note: Mini-games in italics

== 1994 ==
Seed	School	Conference record	Seed	School	Conference record
1	Wisconsin–Superior	13–4–3	4	Wisconsin–River Falls	10–6–4
2	Wisconsin–Stevens Point	13–6–1	5	Wisconsin–Eau Claire	3–15–2
3	Bemidji State	12–6–2	6	Lake Forest	2–16–2

Quarterfinals; February 18–19
3	Bemidji State	6	4	-
4	Lake Forest	2	1	-
4	Wisconsin–River Falls	7	6	-
5	Wisconsin–Eau Claire	1	2	-

Semifinals; February 25–26
1	Wisconsin–Superior	3	6	2
4	Wisconsin–River Falls	4	4	1
2	Wisconsin–Stevens Point	4*	1	-
3	Bemidji State	4	4	-

Championship; March 4–5
1	Wisconsin–Superior	0	8	1*
3	Bemidji State	4	6	0

Note: * denotes overtime period(s)
Note: Mini-games in italics

== 1995 ==
Seed	School	Conference record	Seed	School	Conference record
1	Bemidji State	16–3–1	5	Wisconsin–River Falls	10–6–4
2	Wisconsin–Superior	14–5–1	6	St. Norbert	6–12–2
3	Wisconsin–Stevens Point	10–5–5	7	Lake Forest	5–13–2
4	Wisconsin–Eau Claire	12–8–0	8	St. Scholastica	0–20–0

Quarterfinals; February 17–18
1	Bemidji State	6	13	-
8	St. Scholastica	1	1	-
2	Wisconsin–Superior	8	4	-
7	Lake Forest	0	1	-
3	Wisconsin–Stevens Point	2*	4	-
6	St. Norbert	2	2	-
4	Wisconsin–Eau Claire	11	1	0
5	Wisconsin–River Falls	6	3	1

Semifinals; February 24–25
1	Bemidji State	0	5	2
5	Wisconsin–River Falls	3	2	0
2	Wisconsin–Superior	0	5	1
3	Wisconsin–Stevens Point	6	2	2*

Championship; March 3–4
1	Bemidji State	6	3	-
3	Wisconsin–Stevens Point	1	2	-

Note: * denotes overtime period(s)
Note: Mini-games in italics

== 1996 ==
Seed	School	Conference record	Seed	School	Conference record
1	Wisconsin–River Falls	16–3–1	4	St. Norbert	9–9–2
2	Bemidji State	13–5–2	5	Wisconsin–Eau Claire	7–12–1
3	Wisconsin–Superior	12–6–2	6	Wisconsin–Stevens Point	7–12–1

Quarterfinals; February 16–17
3	Wisconsin–Superior	2	6	-
6	Wisconsin–Stevens Point	2	5	-
4	St. Norbert	5	8	-
5	Wisconsin–Eau Claire	3	3	-

Semifinals; February 23–24
1	Wisconsin–River Falls	3	3	-
4	St. Norbert	1	1	-
2	Bemidji State	6	1	0
3	Wisconsin–Superior	1	3	2

Championship; March 1–2
1	Wisconsin–River Falls	2	3	-
3	Wisconsin–Superior	1	3	-

Note: * denotes overtime period(s)
Note: Mini-games in italics

== 1997 ==
Seed	School	Conference record	Seed	School	Conference record
1	St. Norbert	16–4–0	4	Wisconsin–River Falls	13–7–0
2	Wisconsin–Stevens Point	14–5–1	5	Wisconsin–Eau Claire	7–12–1
3	Wisconsin–Superior	13–6–1	6	Wisconsin–Stout	6–14–0

Quarterfinals; February 21–22
3	Wisconsin–Superior	3	4	-
6	Wisconsin–Stout	2	0	-
4	Wisconsin–River Falls	4	4	-
5	Wisconsin–Eau Claire	1	2	-

Semifinals; February 28–March 1
1	St. Norbert	1	4	-
4	Wisconsin–River Falls	2	7	-
2	Wisconsin–Stevens Point	1	2	0
3	Wisconsin–Superior	4	1	1

Championship; March 7–8
4	Wisconsin–River Falls	0	2	-
3	Wisconsin–Superior	4	3	-

Note: * denotes overtime period(s)
Note: Mini-games in italics

== 1998 ==
Seed	School	Conference record	Seed	School	Conference record
1	St. Norbert	17–3–0	5	Wisconsin–Eau Claire	6–14–0
2	Wisconsin–River Falls	14–5–1	6	Lake Forest	5–13–2
3	Wisconsin–Stevens Point	14–6–0	7	Wisconsin–Stout	3–16–1
4	Wisconsin–Superior	14–6–0	8	St. Scholastica	1–19–0

Quarterfinals; February 20–21
1	St. Norbert	9	6	-
8	St. Scholastica	0	1	-
2	Wisconsin–River Falls	5	7	-
7	Wisconsin–Stout	3	3	-
3	Wisconsin–Stevens Point	4	5	-
6	Lake Forest	1	1	-
4	Wisconsin–Superior	5	4	-
5	Wisconsin–Eau Claire	4	2	-

Semifinals; February 27–28
1	St. Norbert	5	4	-
4	Wisconsin–Superior	2	2	-
2	Wisconsin–River Falls	7	1	0
3	Wisconsin–Stevens Point	4	3	2

Championship; March 6–7
1	St. Norbert	3	1	1
3	Wisconsin–Stevens Point	0	2	0

Note: * denotes overtime period(s)
Note: Mini-games in italics

== 1999 ==
Seed	School	Conference record	Seed	School	Conference record
1	St. Norbert	12–2–2	5	Wisconsin–Stout	6–9–1
2	Wisconsin–River Falls	12–4–0	6	Wisconsin–Eau Claire	4–10–2
3	Wisconsin–Stevens Point	10–6–0	7	Lake Forest	4–12–0
4	Wisconsin–Superior	9–6–1	8	St. Scholastica	2–14–0

Quarterfinals; February 19–20
1	St. Norbert	5	9	-
8	St. Scholastica	3	5	-
2	Wisconsin–River Falls	3	4	-
7	Lake Forest	1	2	-
3	Wisconsin–Stevens Point	6	9	-
6	Wisconsin–Eau Claire	4	2	-
4	Wisconsin–Superior	4	8	-
5	Wisconsin–Stout	4	1	-

Semifinals; February 26–27
1	St. Norbert	2	5	1
4	Wisconsin–Superior	3	2	0
2	Wisconsin–River Falls	4	5	-
3	Wisconsin–Stevens Point	2	4	-

Championship; March 5–6
1	St. Norbert	4	8	-
2	Wisconsin–River Falls	1	1	-

Note: * denotes overtime period(s)
Note: Mini-games in italics

== 2000 ==
Seed	School	Conference record	Seed	School	Conference record
1	Wisconsin–Stevens Point	12–2–0	5	Lake Forest	7–7–0
2	St. Norbert	10–3–1	6	Wisconsin–Eau Claire	5–9–0
3	Wisconsin–Superior	10–4–0	7	Wisconsin–Stout	1–12–1
4	Wisconsin–River Falls	8–4–2	8	St. Scholastica	1–13–0

Quarterfinals; February 18–19
1	Wisconsin–Stevens Point	5	4	-
8	St. Scholastica	1	1	-
2	St. Norbert	5	4	-
7	Wisconsin–Stout	2	1	-
3	Wisconsin–Superior	5	3	-
6	Wisconsin–Eau Claire	1	2	-
4	Wisconsin–River Falls	5	3	-
5	Lake Forest	2	2	-

Semifinals; February 25–26
1	Wisconsin–Stevens Point	3	5	-
4	Wisconsin–River Falls	1	1	-
2	St. Norbert	1	2	1
3	Wisconsin–Superior	3	0	2

Championship; March 3–4
1	Wisconsin–Stevens Point	4	3	-
3	Wisconsin–Superior	4	6	-

Note: * denotes overtime period(s)
Note: Mini-games in italics

== 2001 ==
Seed	School	Conference record	Seed	School	Conference record
1	Wisconsin–Superior	11–3–0	5	Wisconsin–Stevens Point	7–7–0
2	Wisconsin–River Falls	10–4–0	6	St. Scholastica	3–10–1
3	St. Norbert	9–4–1	7	Lake Forest	3–11–0
4	Wisconsin–Stout	9–5–0	8	Wisconsin–Eau Claire	3–11–0

Quarterfinals; February 16–17
1	Wisconsin–Superior	2	4	-
8	Wisconsin–Eau Claire	0	2	-
2	Wisconsin–River Falls	4	3	-
7	Lake Forest	3	1	-
3	St. Norbert	5	5	-
6	St. Scholastica	1	1	-
4	Wisconsin–Stout	3	2	-
5	Wisconsin–Stevens Point	8	3	-

Semifinals; February 23–24
1	Wisconsin–Superior	3	4	-
5	Wisconsin–Stevens Point	1	3	-
2	Wisconsin–River Falls	2	2	1*
3	St. Norbert	1	5	0

Championship; March 2–3
1	Wisconsin–Superior	2	4	-
2	Wisconsin–River Falls	2	2	-

Note: * denotes overtime period(s)
Note: Mini-games in italics

== 2002 ==
Seed	School	Conference record	Seed	School	Conference record
1	St. Norbert	12–0–2	5	Wisconsin–Eau Claire	7–6–1
2	Wisconsin–Superior	8–3–3	6	Lake Forest	4–10–0
3	Wisconsin–Stevens Point	8–4–2	7	Wisconsin–Stout	4–10–0
4	Wisconsin–River Falls	7–5–2	8	St. Scholastica	1–13–0

Note: As the top seed, St. Norbert's arena was used for the semifinal and championship rounds.

Quarterfinals; February 15–16
1	St. Norbert	8	9	-
8	St. Scholastica	1	1	-
2	Wisconsin–Superior	2	6	-
7	Lake Forest	2	2	-
(Pairings are reseeded after the first round)
3	Wisconsin–Stevens Point	5	7	-
6	Wisconsin–Stout	2	5	-
4	Wisconsin–River Falls	4	6	-
5	Wisconsin–Eau Claire	2	2	-

Semifinals; March 1
1	St. Norbert	3**
4	Wisconsin–River Falls	2
2	Wisconsin–Superior	4*
3	Wisconsin–Stevens Point	3

Championship; March 2
1	St. Norbert	3
2	Wisconsin–Superior	4*

Note: * denotes overtime period(s)
Note: Mini-games in italics

== 2003 ==
Seed	School	Conference record	Seed	School	Conference record
1	St. Norbert	12–1–1	5	Lake Forest	6–7–1
2	Wisconsin–Superior	11–2–1	6	St. Scholastica	2–11–1
3	Wisconsin–River Falls	11–2–1	7	Wisconsin–Stout	2–12–0
4	Wisconsin–Stevens Point	8–6–0	8	Wisconsin–Eau Claire	1–12–1

Note: As the top seed, St. Norbert's arena was used for the semifinal and championship rounds.

Quarterfinals; February 14–15
1	St. Norbert	9	6	-
8	Wisconsin–Eau Claire	3	2	-
2	Wisconsin–Superior	3	5	-
7	Wisconsin–Stout	0	0	-
(Pairings are reseeded after the first round)
3	Wisconsin–River Falls	3	14	-
6	St. Scholastica	0	2	-
4	Wisconsin–Stevens Point	3*	6	-
5	Lake Forest	3	5	-

Semifinals; February 28
1	St. Norbert	3
4	Wisconsin–Stevens Point	1
2	Wisconsin–Superior	6
3	Wisconsin–River Falls	3

Championship; March 1
1	St. Norbert	5
2	Wisconsin–Superior	2
Third-place game
3	Wisconsin–River Falls	2
4	Wisconsin–Stevens Point	5

Note: * denotes overtime period(s)
Note: Mini-games in italics

== 2004 ==
Seed	School	Conference record	Seed	School	Conference record
1	St. Norbert	11–2–1	5	Wisconsin–Stout	5–7–2
2	Wisconsin–River Falls	8–3–3	6	Wisconsin–Stevens Point	5–7–2
3	Wisconsin–Superior	7–4–3	7	Wisconsin–Eau Claire	4–9–1
4	Lake Forest	7–5–2	8	St. Scholastica	1–11–2

Note: As the top seed, St. Norbert's arena was used for the semifinal and championship rounds.

Quarterfinals; February 20–21
1	St. Norbert	11	9	-
8	St. Scholastica	1	0	-
4	Lake Forest	4	3*	-
5	Wisconsin–Stout	1	3	-
2	Wisconsin–River Falls	5	3	-
7	Wisconsin–Eau Claire	1	0	-
3	Wisconsin–Superior	4	3	1
6	Wisconsin–Stevens Point	6	1	3

Semifinals; March 5
1	St. Norbert	3
4	Lake Forest	2
2	Wisconsin–River Falls	4
6	Wisconsin–Stevens Point	1

Championship; March 6
1	St. Norbert	2
2	Wisconsin–River Falls	0

Note: * denotes overtime period(s)
Note: Mini-games in italics

=== Quarterfinals ===
==== (1) St. Norbert vs. (8) St. Scholastica ====
February 20	St. Norbert	11 – 1	St. Scholastica	Cornerstone Community Center
04:39 – Tyler Gow (2); 10:50 – Michael Buchan (11); 13:20 – Ryan Tew (8)		First period	No scoring
00:24 – Connor Hughes (8); 10:05 – Connor Hughes (9)		Second period	No scoring
02:29 – Jordan Forslund (3); 03:56 – Curtis Markewich (9); 09:17 – Andy Cote (17); 10:01 – pp – Andy Trann (6)		Third period	Curtis Markewich (9) – 03:56
Chancy Colquhoun (15 saves / 16 shots)		Goalie stats	Josh Liebig (36 saves / 47 shots)

February 21	St. Norbert	9 – 0	St. Scholastica	Cornerstone Community Center
05:41 – pp – Sheldon Wing (4); 08:18 – Jordan Forslund (4); 10:47 – Jeremy Mitchell (8)		First period	No scoring
08:28 – pp – Lonny Forrester (1); 11:31 – Andy Cote (18); 16:14 – Andy Cote (19); 19:29 – James Switzer (2)		Second period	No scoring
13:35 – pp – Andy Trann (7)		Third period	No scoring
Eric Van Den Bosch (12 saves / 12 shots)		Goalie stats	Corey Wogtech (24 saves / 32 shots); Josh Liebig (10 saves / 11 shots)

St. Norbert won series on total points 4 – 0

==== (4) Lake Forest vs. (5) Wisconsin–Stout ====
February 20	Lake Forest	4 – 1	Wisconsin–Stout	Alumni Memorial Fieldhouse
14:43 – Tyler Canal (13)		First period	No scoring
05:36 – Bryan O'Connor (13); 13:24 – Bryan O'Connor (14)		Second period	No scoring
16:07 – pp – Ryan Panet (11)		Third period	Mitch Kellin (16) – pp – 00:46
Joel Cameron (28 saves / 29 shots)		Goalie stats	Jeff Dotson (36 saves / 40 shots)

February 21	Lake Forest	3 – 3	OT	Wisconsin–Stout	Alumni Memorial Fieldhouse
14:23 – pp – Ryan Panet (12)		First period		Lewie Kellin (2) – 05:27
10:53 – Robin Charest (13)		Second period		No scoring
01:45 – Tyler Canal (14)		Third period		Todd Wynia (7) – pp – 05:34; Lewie Kellin (3) – pp – 11:34
No scoring		Overtime		No scoring
Joel Cameron (34 saves / 37 shots)		Goalie stats		Jeff Dotson (31 saves / 34 shots)

Lake Forest won series on total points 3–1

==== (2) Wisconsin–River Falls vs. (7) Wisconsin–Eau Claire ====
February 20	Wisconsin–River Falls	5 – 1	Wisconsin–Eau Claire	Hunt Arena
14:08 – Josh Schlipp (10)		First period	Ben Manny (12) – 02:19
13:44 – Nate Hansen (2); 17:13 – Jim Murphy (13)		Second period	No scoring
03:35 – Jamie Steinert (10); 09:57 – pp – Tony Sikich (8)		Third period	No scoring
Andy Scanlon (21 saves / 22 shots)		Goalie stats	Steffan Braunlich (32 saves / 37 shots)

February 21	Wisconsin–River Falls	3 – 0	Wisconsin–Eau Claire	Hunt Arena
No scoring		First period	No scoring
No scoring		Second period	No scoring
03:19 – Tim Dwyer (2); 08:50 – sh – Josh Schlipp (11); 19:00 – Matt Elsen (10)		Third period	No scoring
Andy Scanlon (19 saves / 19 shots)		Goalie stats	Steffan Braunlich (35 saves / 38 shots)

Wisconsin–River Falls won series on total points 4 – 0

==== (3) Wisconsin–Superior vs. (6) Wisconsin–Stevens Point ====
February 20	Wisconsin–Superior	4 – 6	Wisconsin–Stevens Point	Wessman Arena
05:39 – Andrew Stearns (3); 08:31 – Jeff Barlow (1); 18:33 – pp – Randall Smisko (15)		First period	No scoring
14:20 – pp – Yann Poirier (9)		Second period	Brett Coburn (9) – 06:47; Mike Brolsma (9) – sh – 08:14; Dan Francis (7) – 11:38; Justin Micek (6) – pp – 13:19
No scoring		Third period	James Jernberg (3) – 06:40; James Jernberg (4) – 09:08
Mathieu Bonnelly (15 saves / 18 shots); Baron Bradley (16 saves / 19 shots)		Goalie stats	Ryan Scott (38 saves / 42 shots)

February 21	Wisconsin–Superior	3 – 1	Wisconsin–Stevens Point	Wessman Arena
10:40 – pp – Rob Whidden (13)		First period	No scoring
09:59 – pp – Kyle Nosan (12)		Second period	Adam Kostichka (12) – 19:59
09:54 – Rob Whidden (14)		Third period	No scoring
Baron Bradley (34 saves / 35 shots)		Goalie stats	Ryan Scott (41 saves / 44 shots)

February 21 (mini game)	Wisconsin–Superior	1 – 3	Wisconsin–Stevens Point	Wessman Arena

Wisconsin–Stevens Point won series on total points 3–2

=== Semifinals ===
==== (1) St. Norbert vs. (4) Lake Forest ====
March 5	St. Norbert	3 – 2	Lake Forest	Cornerstone Community Center
03:06 – pp – Faron Duthie (15); 11:12 – pp – Ryan Tew (9)		First period	Robin Charest (14) – 03:28
05:15 – Andy Cote (20)		Second period	No scoring
No scoring		Third period	Cam Doull (11) – sh – 16:36
Chancy Colquhoun (16 saves / 18 shots)		Goalie stats	Joel Cameron (32 saves / 35 shots)

==== (2) Wisconsin–River Falls vs. (6) Wisconsin–Stevens Point ====
March 5	Wisconsin–River Falls	4 – 1	Wisconsin–Stevens Point	Hunt Arena
No scoring		First period	No scoring
08:25 – Steve Moe (9)		Second period	No scoring
03:48 – Jim Murphy (14); 05:51 – Jared Sailer (3); 18:59 – en – Aaron Venasky (5)		Third period	Brett Coburn (10) – 14:26
Andy Scanlon (33 saves / 34 shots)		Goalie stats	Ryan Scott (27 saves / 30 shots)

=== Finals ===
==== (1) St. Norbert vs. (2) Wisconsin–River Falls ====
March 6	St. Norbert	2 – 0	Wisconsin–River Falls	Cornerstone Community Center
03:48 – Andy Cote (21); 09:21 – pp – Spencer Carbery (18)		First period	No scoring
No scoring		Second period	No scoring
No scoring		Third period	No scoring
Chancy Colquhoun (23 saves / 23 shots)		Goalie stats	Andy Scanlon (30 saves / 32 shots)

== 2005 ==
Seed	School	Conference record	Seed	School	Conference record
1	St. Norbert	12–0–2	5	Lake Forest	7–7–0
2	Wisconsin–Superior	9–2–3	6	Wisconsin–Stout	2–9–3
3	Wisconsin–River Falls	9–5–0	7	St. Scholastica	2–10–2
4	Wisconsin–Stevens Point	7–6–1	8	Wisconsin–Eau Claire	1–10–3

Quarterfinals; February 18–19
1	St. Norbert	6	5	-
8	Wisconsin–Eau Claire	3	2	-
4	Wisconsin–Stevens Point	3	1	-
5	Lake Forest	4	6	-
2	Wisconsin–Superior	6	5	-
7	St. Scholastica	2	2	-
3	Wisconsin–River Falls	4	4	2
6	Wisconsin–Stout	0	6	1

Semifinals; February 26
1	St. Norbert	2
5	Lake Forest	1
2	Wisconsin–Superior	6
3	Wisconsin–River Falls	2

Championship; March 5
1	St. Norbert	8
2	Wisconsin–Superior	3

Note: * denotes overtime period(s)
Note: Mini-games in italics

== 2006 ==
Seed	School	Conference record	Seed	School	Conference record
1	St. Norbert	10–2–2	5	Wisconsin–Stevens Point	6–6–2
2	Wisconsin–River Falls	9–4–1	6	St. Scholastica	6–7–1
3	Wisconsin–Superior	7–5–2	7	Wisconsin–Stout	6–8–0
4	Lake Forest	7–7–0	8	Wisconsin–Eau Claire	0–12–2

Quarterfinals; February 17–18
1	St. Norbert	3	5	-
8	Wisconsin–Eau Claire	1	1	-
2	Wisconsin–River Falls	0	2	-
7	Wisconsin–Stout	1	3*	-
(Pairings are reseeded after the first round)
3	Wisconsin–Superior	4	4*	-
6	St. Scholastica	2	4	-
4	Lake Forest	5	4	-
5	Wisconsin–Stevens Point	2	1	-

Semifinals; February 26
1	St. Norbert	7
7	Wisconsin–Stout	2
3	Wisconsin–Superior	2
4	Lake Forest	1

Championship; March 5
1	St. Norbert	2
3	Wisconsin–Superior	3*

Note: * denotes overtime period(s)
Note: Mini-games in italics

== 2007 ==
Seed	School	Conference record	Seed	School	Conference record
1	Wisconsin–River Falls	10–3–1	5	St. Scholastica	6–7–1
2	St. Norbert	10–3–1	6	Wisconsin–Stevens Point	3–10–1
3	Wisconsin–Stout	10–3–1	7	Wisconsin–Eau Claire	2–9–3
4	Wisconsin–Superior	9–4–1	8	Lake Forest	0–11–3

Quarterfinals; February 16–17
1	Wisconsin–River Falls	4	7	-
8	Lake Forest	1	1	-
2	St. Norbert	4	3	-
7	Wisconsin–Eau Claire	3	1	-
(Pairings are reseeded after the first round)
3	Wisconsin–Stout	3	5	-
6	Wisconsin–Stevens Point	2	0	-
4	Wisconsin–Superior	3	3	1
5	St. Scholastica	1	4	2*

Semifinals; February 24
1	Wisconsin–River Falls	1
5	St. Scholastica	2
2	St. Norbert	4
3	Wisconsin–Stout	2

Championship; March 3
5	St. Scholastica	0
2	St. Norbert	3

Note: * denotes overtime period(s)
Note: Mini-games in italics

== 2008 ==
Seed	School	Conference record	Seed	School	Conference record
1	St. Norbert	10–0–4	5	Wisconsin–Eau Claire	6–7–1
2	Wisconsin–River Falls	8–5–1	6	Wisconsin–Stevens Point	5–6–3
3	Wisconsin–Stout	7–5–2	7	St. Scholastica	4–7–3
4	Wisconsin–Superior	6–4–4	8	Lake Forest	1–13–0

Quarterfinals; February 22–23
1	St. Norbert	4	5	-
8	Lake Forest	0	0	-
2	Wisconsin–River Falls	2	3	-
7	St. Scholastica	5	3*	-
(Pairings are reseeded after the first round)
3	Wisconsin–Stout	8	7	-
6	Wisconsin–Stevens Point	4	1	-
4	Wisconsin–Superior	2	5	0
5	Wisconsin–Eau Claire	4	0	1

Semifinals; March 1
1	St. Norbert	1
7	St. Scholastica	0
3	Wisconsin–Stout	3*
5	Wisconsin–Eau Claire	2

Championship; March 8
1	St. Norbert	4*
3	Wisconsin–Stout	3

Note: * denotes overtime period(s)
Note: Mini-games in italics

== 2009 ==
Seed	School	Conference record	Seed	School	Conference record
1	Wisconsin–Superior	11–1–2	5	Wisconsin–Stevens Point	6–7–1
2	Wisconsin–Stout	10–2–2	6	Wisconsin–River Falls	4–9–1
3	St. Scholastica	9–4–1	7	Wisconsin–Eau Claire	3–10–1
4	St. Norbert	8–5–1	8	Lake Forest	0–13–1

Quarterfinals; February 20–21
1	Wisconsin–Superior	4	5	-
8	Lake Forest	3	0	-
2	Wisconsin–Stout	5	2	-
7	Wisconsin–Eau Claire	3	1	-
(Pairings are reseeded after the first round)
3	St. Scholastica	2	2	-
6	Wisconsin–River Falls	0	0	-
4	St. Norbert	8	4	-
5	Wisconsin–Stevens Point	3	3	-

Semifinals; February 28
1	Wisconsin–Superior	3
4	St. Norbert	0
2	Wisconsin–Stout	3
3	St. Scholastica	2

Championship; March 7
1	Wisconsin–Superior	3
2	Wisconsin–Stout	4

Note: * denotes overtime period(s)
Note: Mini-games in italics

== 2010 ==
Seed	School	Conference record	Seed	School	Conference record
1	St. Norbert	14–2–2	5	Wisconsin–Stevens Point	6–12–0
2	St. Scholastica	11–3–4	6	Wisconsin–Eau Claire	4–10–4
3	Wisconsin–River Falls	9–7–2	7	Wisconsin–Superior	3–11–4
4	Wisconsin–Stout	6–8–4			

Quarterfinals; February 19–20
2	St. Scholastica	4*	3*	1*
7	Wisconsin–Superior	4	3	0
3	Wisconsin–River Falls	3	6	-
6	Wisconsin–Eau Claire	1	3	-
4	Wisconsin–Stout	5	1	1
5	Wisconsin–Stevens Point	1	2	2*

Semifinals; February 27
1	St. Norbert	7
5	Wisconsin–Stevens Point	1
2	St. Scholastica	3
3	Wisconsin–River Falls	6

Championship; March 6
1	St. Norbert	7
3	Wisconsin–River Falls	1

Note: * denotes overtime period(s)
Note: Mini-games in italics

== 2011 ==
Seed	School	Conference record	Seed	School	Conference record
1	St. Norbert	14–3–1	5	Wisconsin–Eau Claire	8–9–1
2	Wisconsin–Superior	10–8–0	6	Wisconsin–River Falls	7–10–1
3	Wisconsin–Stout	10–8–0	7	St. Scholastica	4–14–0
4	Wisconsin–Stevens Point	8–9–1			

Quarterfinals; February 18–19
2	Wisconsin–Superior	4	5	-
7	St. Scholastica	2	2	-
3	Wisconsin–Stout	3	3	0
6	Wisconsin–River Falls	2	4*	2
4	Wisconsin–Stevens Point	2	1	2
5	Wisconsin–Eau Claire	4	0	0

Semifinals; February 26
1	St. Norbert	5
6	Wisconsin–River Falls	3
2	Wisconsin–Superior	4
4	Wisconsin–Stevens Point	2

Championship; March 5
1	St. Norbert	2
2	Wisconsin–Superior	1

Note: * denotes overtime period(s)
Note: Mini-games in italics

== 2012 ==
Seed	School	Conference record	Seed	School	Conference record
1	St. Norbert	12–4–2	5	Wisconsin–Superior	4–7–7
2	St. Scholastica	9–5–4	6	Wisconsin–Eau Claire	5–11–2
3	Wisconsin–River Falls	10–6–2	7	Wisconsin–Stout	4–13–1
4	Wisconsin–Stevens Point	8–6–4			

Quarterfinals; February 17–18
2	St. Scholastica	4*	3*	-
7	Wisconsin–Stout	4	2	-
3	Wisconsin–River Falls	1	1	-
6	Wisconsin–Eau Claire	3	2*	-
4	Wisconsin–Stevens Point	1	3	2*
5	Wisconsin–Superior	2	0	1

Semifinals; February 25
1	St. Norbert	2
6	Wisconsin–Eau Claire	0
2	St. Scholastica	1
4	Wisconsin–Stevens Point	5

Championship; March 3
1	St. Norbert	4
4	Wisconsin–Stevens Point	0

Note: * denotes overtime period(s)
Note: Mini-games in italics

== 2013 ==
Seed	School	Conference record	Seed	School	Conference record
1	Wisconsin–Eau Claire	14–3–1	5	Wisconsin–Superior	6–10–2
2	St. Norbert	13–4–1	6	Wisconsin–River Falls	5–9–4
3	Wisconsin–Stevens Point	8–9–1	7	Wisconsin–Stout	5–13–0
4	St. Scholastica	7–10–1			

Quarterfinals; February 15–16
2	St. Norbert	3	3	-
7	Wisconsin–Stout	2	2	-
3	Wisconsin–Stevens Point	2	1	1
6	Wisconsin–River Falls	1	4	3
4	St. Scholastica	4	2	-
5	Wisconsin–Superior	2	1	-

Semifinals; February 23
1	Wisconsin–Eau Claire	7
6	Wisconsin–River Falls	2
2	St. Norbert	2
4	St. Scholastica	1

Championship; March 2
1	Wisconsin–Eau Claire	0
2	St. Norbert	3

Note: * denotes overtime period(s)
Note: Mini-games in italics

== 2014 ==
Seed	School	Conference record	Seed	School	Conference record
1	St. Norbert	16–2–0	5	Marian	10–7–1
2	Adrian	14–1–3	6	Concordia (WI)	7–9–2
3	St. Scholastica	10–5–3	7	MSOE	6–12–0
4	Lake Forest	11–7–0	8	Lawrence	5–12–1

Quarterfinals; February 21–22
1	St. Norbert	5	3	-
8	Lawrence	0	1	-
2	Adrian	3	4	-
7	MSOE	0	1	-
(Pairings are reseeded after the first round)
3	St. Scholastica	1	9	-
6	Concordia (WI)	0	4	-
4	Lake Forest	2	3*	1*
5	Marian	3	2	0

Semifinals; March 1
1	St. Norbert	6
4	Lake Forest	0
2	Adrian	3
3	St. Scholastica	4

Championship; March 8
1	St. Norbert	6
3	St. Scholastica	1

Note: * denotes overtime period(s)
Note: Mini-games in italics

== 2015 ==
Seed	School	Conference record	Seed	School	Conference record
1	Adrian	16–1–1	5	Marian	9–8–1
2	St. Norbert	13–4–1	6	St. Scholastica	8–8–2
3	Lake Forest	12–5–1	7	Lawrence	6–12–0
4	MSOE	11–7–0	8	Concordia (WI)	4–14–0

Quarterfinals; February 20–22
1	Adrian	3	8	-
8	Concordia (WI)	0	4	-
2	St. Norbert	5	6	-
7	Lawrence	0	0	-
(Pairings are reseeded after the first round)
3	Lake Forest	1	3	0
6	St. Scholastica	2	2	1
4	MSOE	6	2	3*
5	Marian	3	4	2

Semifinals; February 28
1	Adrian	4*
6	St. Scholastica	3
2	St. Norbert	3
3	MSOE	1

Championship; March 7
1	Adrian	4
2	St. Norbert	2

Note: * denotes overtime period(s)
Note: Mini-games in italics

== 2016 ==
Seed	School	Conference record	Seed	School	Conference record
N1	St. Norbert	17–2–1	S1	Adrian	17–2–1
N2	St. Scholastica	12–7–1	S2	Marian	15–4–1
N3	Lawrence	8–9–3	S3	Concordia (WI)	7–10–3

Quarterfinals; February 24
S2	Marian	3
S3	Concordia (WI)	0
N2	St. Scholastica	6
N3	Lawrence	2

Semifinals; February 26–27
N1	St. Norbert	4	5	–
S2	Marian	1	2	–
S1	Adrian	4	4	–
N2	St. Scholastica	2	2	–

Championship; March 5
N1	St. Norbert	1
S1	Adrian	4

Note: * denotes overtime period(s)
Note: Mini-games in italics

=== Quarterfinals ===
==== (S2) Marian vs. (S3) Concordia (WI) ====
February 24	Marian	3 – 0	Concordia (WI)	Blue Line Family Ice Center	Recap
00:26 – Gianni Mangone (11); 07:41 – Curtis Lewington (3)		First period	No scoring
19:46 – pp – Jake Howie (10)		Second period	No scoring
No scoring		Third period	No scoring
Michael Baldwin (18 saves / 18 shots)		Goalie stats	Jack Romanuik (33 saves / 36 shots)

==== (N2) St. Scholastica vs. (N3) Lawrence ====
February 24	St. Scholastica	6 – 2	Lawrence	Mars Lakeview Arena	Recap
09:53 – pp – Keegan Bruce (11)		First period	No scoring
01:43 – Keegan Bruce (12); 11:15 – Josh Hansen (8); 13:06 – Kristofer McKinzie (2); 15:03 – ps – Kristofer McKinzie (3)		Second period	Josh Koepplinger (9) – 01:57
15:38 – pp – Keegan Bruce (13)		Third period	Josh Koepplinger (10) – 02:27
Tyler Bruggeman (27 saves / 29 shots)		Goalie stats	Mattias Söderqvist (31 saves / 37 shots)

=== Semifinals ===
==== (N1) St. Norbert vs. (S2) Marian ====
February 26	St. Norbert	4 – 1	Marian	Cornerstone Community Center	Recap
09:55 – Roman Uchyn (12)		First period	Tanner Pagendam (6) – 16:02
14:33 – Chris Rygus (3)		Second period	No scoring
6:29 – Ross Pavek (6); 18:56 – en – Tanner Froese (4)		Third period	No scoring
Tony Kujava (11 saves / 12 shots)		Goalie stats	Michael Baldwin (18 saves / 21 shots)

February 27	St. Norbert	5 – 2	Marian	Cornerstone Community Center	Recap
02:29 – Michael Hill (15); 11:41 – pp – Roman Uchyn (13); 12:27 – Ross Pavek (7)		First period	No scoring
08:56 – Tanner Froese (5)		Second period	No scoring
13:43 – Erik Cooper (12)		Third period	Gianni Mangone (12) – 05:21; Devin Stuermer (18) – 10:40
Tony Kujava (17 saves / 19 shots)		Goalie stats	Michael Baldwin (8 saves / 11 shots); Mike Gudmandson (16 saves / 18 shots)

St. Norbert won series on total points 4–0

==== (S1) Adrian vs. (N2) St. Scholastica ====
February 26	Adrian	4 – 2	St. Scholastica	Arrington Ice Arena	Recap
02:28 – Brian Bachnak (2)		First period	No scoring
05:36 – Austin Hervey (9)		Second period	No scoring
07:16 – Trevor Boyd (15); 19:47 – en – Trevor Boyd (16)		Third period	Keegan Bruce (14) – 09:41; Derek Sutliffe (6) – sh – 16:49
Kevin Entmaa (21 saves / 23 shots)		Goalie stats	Tyler Bruggeman (34 saves / 37 shots)

February 27	Adrian	4 – 2	St. Scholastica	Arrington Ice Arena	Recap
03:48 – Austin Hervey (10); 12:40 – Chris Leone (11)		First period	Derek Sutliffe (7) – pp – 17:49
No scoring		Second period	Keegan Bruce (15) – 07:32
16:29 – Brian Bachnak (3); 19:59 – en – Austin Hervey (11)		Third period	No scoring
Kevin Entmaa (25 saves / 27 shots)		Goalie stats	Tyler Bruggeman (37 saves / 40 shots)

Adrian won series on total points 4–0

=== Finals ===
==== (N1) Adrian vs. (N1) St. Norbert ====
March 5	Adrian	4 – 1	St. Norbert	Arrington Ice Arena	Recap
18:49 – Bryan Yim (13)		First period	No scoring
16:07 – pp – Taylor McCloy (11)		Second period	No scoring
16:47 – Connor Armour (8); 19:50 – en – Jeremy Olinyk (12)		Third period	Tanner Froese (6) – sh – 12:14
Kevin Entmaa (23 saves / 23 shots); Tyler Parks (15 saves / 16 shots)		Goalie stats	T.J. Black (31 saves / 34 shots)

== 2017 ==
Seed	School	Conference record	Seed	School	Conference record
N1	St. Norbert	15–4–1	S1	Adrian	17–3–0
N2	St. Scholastica	10–9–1	S2	Marian	12–7–1
N3	Northland	9–10–1	S3	Lake Forest	12–8–0

Quarterfinals; February 22
N2	St. Scholastica	3
N3	Northland	1
S2	Marian	5
S3	Lake Forest	2

Semifinals; February 25
N1	St. Norbert	4
N2	St. Scholastica	0
S1	Adrian	2
S2	Marian	1

Championship; March 4
N1	St. Norbert	3
S1	Adrian	2

Note: * denotes overtime period(s)

== 2018 ==
Seed	School	Conference record	Seed	School	Conference record
N1	St. Norbert	15–3–0	S1	Adrian	17–1–0
N2	Marian	12–6–0	S2	Concordia (WI)	12–6–0
N3	St. Scholastica	9–8–1	S3	Lake Forest	10–6–2
N4	Lawrence	8–9–1	S4	MSOE	7–10–1

Quarterfinals; February 16–17
N1	St. Norbert	3	3	-
N4	Lawrence	1	1	-
North Division
N2	Marian	4	3	-
N3	St. Scholastica	1	2	-
S1	Adrian	3	6	-
S4	MSOE	2	3	-
South Division
S2	Concordia (WI)	3	1	-
S3	Lake Forest	5	2*	-

Semifinals; February 24
N1	St. Norbert	3
N2	Marian	0
S1	Adrian	9
S3	Lake Forest	0

Championship; March 3
N1	St. Norbert	2*
S1	Adrian	1

Note: * denotes overtime period(s)
Note: Mini-games in italics

== 2019 ==
Seed	School	Conference record	Seed	School	Conference record
N1	St. Norbert	14–3–1	S1	Adrian	13–4–1
N2	Marian	11–5–2	S2	Lake Forest	9–5–4
N3	Northland	9–7–2	S3	Aurora	8–9–1
N4	Finlandia	6–10–2	S4	MSOE	7–8–3

Quarterfinals; February 15–16
N1	St. Norbert	2	9	-
N4	Finlandia	1	0	-
North Division
N2	Marian	1	5	1
N3	Northland	2	1	0
S1	Adrian	1	7	2
S4	MSOE	3	2	0
South Division
S2	Lake Forest	4	1	2*
S3	Aurora	2	5	1

Semifinals; February 23
N1	St. Norbert	6
N2	Marian	2
S1	Adrian	5
S2	Lake Forest	1

Championship; March 2
N1	St. Norbert	4
S1	Adrian	1

Note: * denotes overtime period(s)
Note: Mini-games in italics

== 2020 ==
Seed	School	Conference record	Seed	School	Conference record
N1	Marian	13–7–0	S1	Adrian	15–3–2
N2	St. Norbert	11–7–2	S2	Lake Forest	14–4–2
N3	Lawrence	5–13–2	S3	Trine	10–7–3
N4	St. Scholastica	5–14–1	S4	Aurora	8–6–6

Quarterfinals; February 21–22
N1	Marian	3	4	2*
N4	St. Scholastica	5	1	1
North Division
N2	St. Norbert	8	5	-
N3	Lawrence	2	2	-
S1	Adrian	7	5	-
S4	Aurora	5	3	-
South Division
S2	Lake Forest	4	3	0
S3	Trine	5*	1	1

Semifinals; February 29
N1	Marian	0
N2	St. Norbert	2
S1	Adrian	4
S3	Trine	3

Championship; March 7
N2	St. Norbert	2
S1	Adrian	3

Note: * denotes overtime period(s)
Note: Mini-games in italics

== 2021 ==
Seed	School	Conference record	Seed	School	Conference record
N1	Concordia (WI)	6–2–0–1–1–0	S1	Adrian	8–0–0–0–0–0
N2	Marian	5–3–0–0–0–0	S2	Aurora	4–4–0–1–1–0
N3	Lawrence	4–4–0–0–1–0	S3	MSOE	3–4–1–1–2–1
N4	St. Scholastica	4–4–0–1–1–0	S4	Trine	3–4–1–1–0–0

Quarterfinals; March 9–10
N1	Concordia (WI)	4
N4	St. Scholastica	5*
North Division
N2	Marian	3
N3	Lawrence	1
S1	Adrian	4
S4	Trine	1
South Division
S2	Aurora	1
S3	MSOE	2

Semifinals; March 12–13
N4	St. Scholastica	3	3	-
N2	Marian	6	5	-
S1	Adrian	3	1	-
S3	MSOE	3	3	-

Championship; March 19–20
N2	Marian	3	4	-
S3	MSOE	1	1	-

Note: * denotes overtime period(s)
Note: Mini-games in italics

== 2022 ==
Seed	School	Conference record	Seed	School	Conference record
1	Adrian	18–0–0–0–0–0	5	Lawrence	8–8–2–0–0–1
2	St. Norbert	16–2–0–0–0–0	6	MSOE	8–9–1–0–0–1
3	Aurora	12–6–0–0–0–0	7	Marian	5–11–2–0–0–2
4	Trine	11–7–0–0–0–0	8	Lake Forest	5–11–2–0–0–0

Quarterfinals; February 18–19
1	Adrian	2	3	-
8	Lake Forest	1	1	-
2	St. Norbert	6	8	-
7	Marian	1	6	-
3	Aurora	6	0	2
6	MSOE	3	7	0
4	Trine	4	3*	-
5	Lawrence	1	2	-

Semifinals; February 26
1	Adrian	5
4	Trine	2
2	St. Norbert	5*
3	Aurora	4

Championship; March 5
1	Adrian	12
2	St. Norbert	3

Note: * denotes overtime period(s)
Note: Mini-games in italics

== 2023 ==
Seed	School	Conference record	Seed	School	Conference record
1	Adrian	13–4–1–1–0–1	5	MSOE	9–9–0–1–2–0
2	Aurora	13–3–2–2–0–0	6	Marian	8–8–2–3–2–1
3	St. Norbert	12–5–1–0–2–0	7	Lake Forest	7–8–3–2–0–2
4	Trine	12–6–0–1–2–0	8	Concordia (WI)	4–13–1–1–2–0

Quarterfinals; February 17–18
1	Adrian	11	13	-
8	Concordia (WI)	1	2	-
2	Aurora	5	2	4
7	Lake Forest	2	3	0
3	St. Norbert	5	8	-
6	Marian	2	2	-
4	Trine	1	5	1
5	MSOE	2	3	0

Semifinals; February 25
1	Adrian	6
4	Trine	2
2	Aurora	4
3	St. Norbert	3

Championship; March 4
1	Adrian	8
2	Aurora	1

Note: * denotes overtime period(s)
Note: Mini-games in italics

== 2024 ==
Seed	School	Conference record	Seed	School	Conference record
1	Adrian	16–2–0–1–0–0	5	MSOE	8–9–1–1–2–1
2	St. Norbert	15–3–0–3–0–0	6	Lawrence	6–10–2–1–1–0
3	Trine	13–5–0–3–1–0	7	Marian	5–12–1–1–2–1
4	Aurora	12–6–0–1–0–0	8	Concordia (WI)	6–12–0–2–2–0

Quarterfinals; February 16–17
1	Adrian	10	10	-
8	Concordia (WI)	2	1	-
2	St. Norbert	6	5	-
7	Marian	1	0	-
3	Trine	5	2	-
6	Lawrence	0	2	-
4	Aurora	2	5	-
5	MSOE	1	1	-

Semifinals; February 24
1	Adrian	4
4	Aurora	0
2	St. Norbert	4*
3	Trine	3

Championship; March 2
1	Adrian	1
2	St. Norbert	3

Note: * denotes overtime period(s)
Note: Mini-games in italics

== 2025 ==
Seed	School	Conference record	Seed	School	Conference record
1	Aurora	15–2–1–1–1–1	5	MSOE	7–8–3–0–0–1
2	St. Norbert	15–3–0–3–0–0	6	Marian	6–11–1–1–2–1
3	Trine	12–4–2–0–0–2	7	Concordia (WI)	7–11–0–1–0–0
4	Adrian	10–7–1–2–1–0	8	Lawrence	6–11–1–1–1–1

Quarterfinals; February 21–22
1	Aurora	4	4	-
8	Lawrence	1	2	-
2	St. Norbert	8	2*	-
7	Concordia (WI)	1	2	-
3	Trine	5	4	-
6	Marian	0	1	-
4	Adrian	4	1	1
5	MSOE	2	2	0

Semifinals; March 1
1	Aurora	0
4	Adrian	2
2	St. Norbert	6
3	Trine	1

Championship; March 8
4	Adrian	4
2	St. Norbert	7

Note: * denotes overtime period(s)
Note: Mini-games in italics

== 2026 ==
Seed	School	Conference record	Seed	School	Conference record
1	Adrian	14–4–1–0–1–1	5	MSOE	7–8–3–0–1–0
2	St. Norbert	13–3–2–1–0–1	6	Marian	8–10–0–3–1–0
3	Trine	12–4–2–1–1–1	7	Lake Forest	6–11–1–0–1–1
4	Aurora	13–4–1–3–0–1	8	Concordia (WI)	6–11–1–0–0–0

Quarterfinals; February 20–21
1	Adrian	6	10	-
8	Lake Forest	2	1	-
2	St. Norbert	5	8	-
7	Concordia (WI)	2	1	-
3	Trine	4	3*	-
6	Marian	1	2	-
4	Aurora	8	6	-
5	MSOE	0	2	-

Semifinals; February 28
1	Adrian	2
4	Aurora	6
2	St. Norbert	5
3	Trine	1

Championship; March 7
4	Aurora	1
2	St. Norbert	3

Note: * denotes overtime period(s)
Note: Mini-games in italics

=== Quarterfinals ===
==== (1) Adrian vs. (8) Lake Forest ====
February 20	Adrian	6 – 2	Lake Forest	Arrington Ice Arena
10:56 – Lucas Deeb (8)		First period	No scoring
02:29 – Theo Thrun (8); 06:06 – Frank Tafelski (11)		Second period	No scoring
05:03 – Frank Tafelski (12); 10:35 – Ian Amsbaugh (10); 16:40 – Ian Amsbaugh (11)		Third period	Max Jaldung (10) – 14:37; Chase Freiermuth (5) – pp – 15:42
Ryan Piros (17 saves / 19 shots)		Goalie stats	Lucas Szyszka (36 saves / 42 shots)

February 21	Adrian	10 – 1	Lake Forest	Arrington Ice Arena
10:23 – Jake Suede (11); 18:07 – Ian Amsbaugh (12); 19:17 – Devyn Orpana (4)		First period	No scoring
08:17 – sh – Ryan Vellucci (6); 13:04 – Frank Tafelski (13); 16:04 – Devyn Orpana (5)		Second period	Max Jaldung (11) – pp – 03:22
06:39 – Devyn Orpana (6); 07:46 – pp – Frank Tafelski (14); 13:36 – David Clarke (8); 14:53 – Ryan Vellucci (7)		Third period	No scoring
Ryan Piros (18 saves / 19 shots)		Goalie stats	Lucas Szyszka (28 saves / 34 shots); Dylan Kruss (12 saves / 16 shots)

Adrian won series on total points 4–0

==== (2) St. Norbert vs. (7) Concordia (WI) ====
February 20	St. Norbert	5 – 2	Concordia (WI)	Cornerstone Community Center
08:44 – Ethan Byrne (10); 13:44 – pp – Calvin Hanson (12)		First period	Matt Green (10) – 09:42
04:30 – Trevor Mitchell (1)		Second period	Matthew Koepke (1) – 09:07
03:31 – Calvin Hanson (13); 19:55 – pp – Blake Ulve (6)		Third period	No scoring
Hunter Garvey (17 saves / 19 shots)		Goalie stats	Blake Hazelton (24 saves / 29 shots)

February 21	St. Norbert	8 – 1	Concordia (WI)	Cornerstone Community Center
11:25 – pp – Calvin Hanson (13); 16:46 – Logan Dombrowsky (13)		First period	No scoring
06:23 – Ethan Byrne (11); 11:31 – pp – Ethan Byrne (12); 12:21 – pp – Braden Lindstrom (5)		Second period	Connor Van Weelie (15) – 07:04
07:29 – Jack Christen (4); 17:28 – Gustav Portillo (6); 18:56 – pp – Ryan Gingher (6)		Third period	No scoring
Hunter Garvey (18 saves / 19 shots)		Goalie stats	Blake Hazelton (20 saves / 25 shots); Ewan McDevitt (15 saves / 18 shots)

St. Norbert won series on total points 4–0

==== (3) Trine vs. (6) Marian ====
February 20	Trine	4 – 1	Marian	Thunder Ice Arena
00:43 – Brody Simko (10); 12:21 – pp – Alexander Babich (12)		First period	No scoring
17:07 – Sam Antenucci (8)		Second period	Edison Weeks (3) – 08:28
19:59 – pp – Luke de Vries (5)		Third period	No scoring
Kyle Kozma (14 saves / 15 shots)		Goalie stats	Nicholas Von Kaufmann (29 saves / 33 shots)

February 21	Trine	3 – 2	OT	Marian	Thunder Ice Arena
No scoring		First period		Hayden Tuba (1) – 19:34
18:09 – Brendan Hill (3)		Second period		No scoring
08:14 – Evan Carroll (3)		Third period		Nolan Flint (10) – 14:19
01:58 – Brody Simko (11)		Overtime		No scoring
Kyle Kozma (23 saves / 25 shots)		Goalie stats		Andreai Proctor-Ramirez (37 saves / 40 shots)

Trine won series on total points 4–0

==== (4) Aurora vs. (5) MSOE ====
February 20	Aurora	8 – 0	MSOE	Fox Valley Ice Arena
04:44 – Simon Diaz (4); 11:27 – Roc Truman (8); 19:21 – Conor Ronayne (10)		First period	No scoring
No scoring		Second period	No scoring
00:26 – Chayce Schmidt (8); 10:16 – Jakson Kirk (16); 16:14 – pp – Lukas Sedlacek (15); 18:21 – pp – Jakson Kirk (17); 19:16 – pp – Landry Schmuck (9)		Third period	No scoring
Matthew O'Donnell (18 saves / 18 shots)		Goalie stats	Austin Schwab (37 saves / 45 shots)

February 21	Aurora	6 – 2	MSOE	Fox Valley Ice Arena
00:15 – Andrew Schultz (1); 12:20 – Juliano Santalucia (6)		First period	Jackson Yee (2) – sh – 09:19
13:19 – Jacob Brockman (7); 17:10 – Lukas Sedlacek (16)		Second period	Eddie Shepler (7) – 10:48
05:36 – Landry Schmuck (10); 11:08 – pp – Jakson Kirk (18)		Third period	No scoring
Matthew O'Donnell (25 saves / 27 shots)		Goalie stats	Austin Schwab (28 saves / 34 shots)

Aurora won series on total points 4–0

=== Semifinals ===
==== (1) Adrian vs. (4) Aurora ====
February 28	Adrian	2 – 6	Aurora	Arrington Ice Arena
07:53 – pp – Bradley Somers (15)		First period	Simon Diaz (5) – 01:40; Jakson Kirk (19) – 02:39; Jakson Kirk (20) – 13:18
No scoring		Second period	Jakson Kirk (21) – pp – 10:42
03:18 – Anthony Mollica (4)		Third period	Lukas Sedlacek (16) – en – 18:01; Jaden Davis (12) – en – 19:03
Ryan Piros (21 saves / 25 shots)		Goalie stats	Matthew O'Donnell (32 saves / 34 shots)

==== (2) St. Norbert vs. (3) Trine ====
February 28	St. Norbert	5 – 1	Trine	Cornerstone Community Center
02:57 – Jack Christen (5); 09:39 – Calvin Hanson (15)		First period	Drew Jeffers (12) – pp – 16:11
No scoring		Second period	No scoring
13:56 – Braydon Beahm (15); 15:50 – en – Cooper Morris (1); 16:25 – en – Blake Ulve (7)		Third period	No scoring
Hunter Garvey (22 saves / 23 shots)		Goalie stats	Kyle Kozma (2 saves / 3 shots); Peyton Grainer (28 saves / 30 shots)

=== Finals ===
==== (2) St. Norbert vs. (3) Aurora ====
March 7	St. Norbert	3 – 1	Aurora	Cornerstone Community Center
12:24 – Blake Ulve (8); 18:37 – Calvin Hanson (16)		First period	No scoring
02:13 – Ryan Gingher (7)		Second period	No scoring
No scoring		Third period	Lukas Sedlacek (17) – 17:42
Hunter Garvey (29 saves / 30 shots)		Goalie stats	Matthew O'Donnell (31 saves / 34 shots)

== Championships ==
=== Current teams ===
School	Championships
St. Norbert	18
Adrian	5
Marian	1

=== Former teams ===
School	Championships
Wisconsin–Superior	6
Wisconsin–Stevens Point	5
Bemidji State	2
Wisconsin–River Falls	2
St. Cloud State	1
Wisconsin–Stout	1

== Sources ==
- "College Hockey Stats". collegehockeystats.net.
- "Bemidji State Beavers Men's Ice Hockey 2012-13 Media Guide" (PDF). Bemidji State Beavers.
- "Minnesota State Mavericks men's Hockey 2018-19 Record Book" (PDF). Minnesota State Mavericks.
- "Lake Forest Men's Ice Hockey All Seasons Game-by-Game Results". Lake Forest Foresters.
- "St. Cloud State Men's 2018-19 Hockey Media Guide" (PDF). St. Cloud State Huskies.
- "St. Norbert 2018-19 Men's Hockey Yearbook" (PDF). St. Norbert Green Knights.
- "St. Scholastica 2018-19 Men's Hockey Record Book" (PDF). St. Scholastica Saints.
- "Wisconsin–Eau Claire All Time Results". Wisconsin–Eau Claire Blugolds.
- "Wisconsin–River Falls Year-By-Year Results". Wisconsin–River Falls Falcons.
- "Wisconsin–Stevens Point Men's Hockey Past Seasons". Wisconsin–Stevens Point Pointers.
- "Wisconsin–Superior Yellowjacket Men's Hockey History and Record Book" (PDF). Wisconsin–Superior Yellowjackets.
