= 2020 NCAA Division III men's ice hockey tournament =

- Teams: 12
- Finals site: LECOM Harborcenter, Buffalo, New York

The 2020 NCAA Division III Men's Ice Hockey Tournament was a postseason tournament scheduled for the culmination of the 2019–20 season, the 37th such tournament in NCAA history. It was scheduled to conclude on March 28 at the LECOM Harborcenter in Buffalo, New York. On March 12, the NCAA announced that the tournament was cancelled due to the coronavirus pandemic.

== Qualifying teams ==
Twelve teams qualified for the tournament in the following ways: (Pool A) eight teams will receive bids as a result of being conference tournament champions from conferences that possessed an automatic bid, (Pool C) four additional teams will receive at-large bids based upon their records.

East							West						
Seed	School	Conference	Record	Berth Type	Appearance	Last Bid	Seed	School	Conference	Record	Berth Type	Appearance	Last Bid
1	Utica (1)	UCHC	25–2–2	Tournament Champion	2nd	2013	1	Wisconsin–Eau Claire (4)	WIAC	22–4–2	At–Large	3rd	2013
2	Norwich (2)	NEHC	24–2–2	Tournament Champion	19th	2019	2	Adrian	NCHA	21–5–3	Tournament Champion	9th	2018
3	Geneseo State (3)	SUNYAC	22–3–2	Tournament Champion	8th	2019	3	Lake Forest	NCHA	18–6–3	At–Large	2nd	1991
4	Hobart	NEHC	20–5–3	At–Large	10th	2019	4	St. Thomas	MIAC	15–10–3	Tournament Champion	17th	2014
5	Endicott	CCC	22–5–0	Tournament Champion	2nd	2017							
6	Babson	NEHC	18–6–2	At–Large	15th	2014							
7	Wesleyan	NESCAC	15–11–1	Tournament Champion	1st	Never							
8	Plymouth State	MASCAC	15–9–3	Tournament Champion	4th	2019							

== Format ==
The tournament was to feature four rounds of play. All rounds would have been Single-game elimination.

The top four overall seeds, with at least one coming from each region, received automatic bids into the quarterfinal round and were arranged so that if all were to reach the semifinals, the top seed would play the fourth seed while the second seed would play the third seed.

The two lowest seeded western teams were placed in the first round of the same quarterfinal bracket with the winner advancing to play the top western seed. The remaining western seed was set against the top eastern team in the first round with the winner advancing to play the third eastern seed.

The remaining eastern teams were arranged so that the fifth- and eighth-seeded teams would play with the winner advancing to play the second eastern seed while the sixth- and seventh-seeded teams would play with the winner advancing to play the top eastern seed.

In the First Round and Quarterfinals the higher-seeded team served as host.

== Tournament Bracket ==
First Round; March 14
E6	Babson
E7	Wesleyan
W3	Lake Forest
W4	St. Thomas
E5	Endicott
E8	Plymouth State
W2	Adrian
E4	Hobart

Quarterfinals; March 21
E1	Utica (1)
W1	Wisconsin–Eau Claire (4)
E2	Norwich (2)
E3	Geneseo State (3)

Semifinals; March 27

National Championship; March 28

Note: * denotes overtime period(s)
