= 2018–19 NCAA Division III men's ice hockey season =

- Duration: October 13, 2018– March 23, 2019
- NCAA tournament: 2019
- National championship: K.B. Willett Arena; Stevens Point, Wisconsin
- NCAA champion: Wisconsin–Stevens Point
- Sid Watson Award: Devin McDonald (Geneseo State)

The 2018–19 NCAA Division III men's ice hockey season began on October 13, 2018, and concluded on March 23, 2019. This was the 46th season of Division III college ice hockey.

== Regular season ==
=== Standings ===
2018–19 Commonwealth Coast Conference ice hockey standings
	Conference							Overall					
	GP	W	L	T	PTS	GF	GA	GP	W	L	T	GF	GA
Salve Regina †	17	13	3	1	27	75	43	27	18	7	2	99	71
Curry	17	11	4	2	24	81	47	26	16	7	3	110	70
University of New England *	17	11	5	1	23	81	37	30	21	7	2	137	64
Nichols	17	9	6	2	20	57	42	26	11	12	3	78	74
Endicott	17	9	8	0	18	83	62	27	16	9	2	130	84
Wentworth	17	6	10	1	13	57	75	26	8	14	4	81	111
Western New England	17	3	14	0	6	30	89	25	8	17	0	61	113
Becker	17	2	14	1	5	27	96	25	3	21	1	43	133
Championship: March 2, 2019 † indicates conference regular season champion * indicates conference tournament champions

2018–19 NCAA Division III Independent ice hockey standings
	Overall record					
	GP	W	L	T	GF	GA
Anna Maria	24	4	16	4	50	102
Bryn Athyn	24	7	17	0	64	89
Canton State	25	14	9	2	78	80

2018–19 Massachusetts State Collegiate Athletic Conference ice hockey standings
	Conference							Overall					
	GP	W	L	T	PTS	GF	GA	GP	W	L	T	GF	GA
Plymouth State †*	18	12	4	2	26	74	49	28	17	8	3	108	72
Westfield State	18	11	6	1	23	55	49	26	14	9	3	88	77
Massachusetts–Dartmouth	18	10	6	2	22	67	41	26	13	11	2	94	68
Worcester State	18	9	7	2	20	57	55	27	15	10	2	85	80
Fitchburg State	18	9	7	2	20	58	42	26	12	12	2	91	70
Salem State	18	7	11	0	14	50	70	28	10	17	1	68	104
Framingham State	18	0	17	1	1	33	88	25	2	22	1	51	118
Championship: March 2, 2019 † indicates conference regular season champion * indicates conference tournament champions

2018–19 Minnesota Intercollegiate Athletic Conference ice hockey standings
	Conference								Overall					
	GP	W	L	T	SW	PTS	GF	GA	GP	W	L	T	GF	GA
Augsburg †*	16	13	1	2	0	41	63	28	28	21	4	3	109	61
Saint John's	16	9	4	3	2	32	51	34	27	12	10	5	77	62
St. Thomas	16	8	3	5	2	31	51	38	26	14	7	5	85	66
Concordia (MN)	16	9	5	2	2	31	54	40	26	13	10	3	83	74
Saint Mary's	16	7	7	2	1	24	48	49	27	9	15	3	74	89
Hamline	16	5	10	1	1	17	35	64	25	5	18	2	52	96
Bethel	16	4	10	2	1	15	32	51	25	4	19	2	47	101
Gustavus Adolphus	16	4	11	1	0	13	38	42	25	7	17	1	53	62
St. Olaf	16	3	11	2	1	12	30	56	24	5	17	2	45	83
Championship: March 2, 2019 † indicates conference regular season champion * indicates conference tournament champion

2018–19 New England Hockey Conference standings
	Conference							Overall					
	GP	W	L	T	PTS	GF	GA	GP	W	L	T	GF	GA
Massachusetts–Boston †	18	14	3	1	29	72	35	28	19	8	1	103	57
Norwich *	18	13	4	1	27	62	30	31	23	5	3	102	52
Babson	18	11	4	3	25	67	51	27	17	7	3	95	73
Hobart	18	11	5	2	24	75	41	31	21	8	2	121	67
New England College	18	9	4	5	23	55	41	26	16	5	5	92	52
Skidmore	18	9	6	3	21	56	51	26	13	10	3	77	72
Suffolk	18	5	13	0	10	47	75	25	8	17	0	68	90
Southern Maine	18	4	13	1	9	38	70	26	5	18	3	58	102
Castleton	18	2	14	2	6	38	77	25	4	17	4	54	98
Johnson & Wales	18	2	14	2	6	38	77	25	4	18	3	53	101
Championship: March 2, 2019 † indicates conference regular season champion * indicates conference tournament champion

2018–19 New England Small College Athletic Conference ice hockey standings
	Conference							Overall					
	GP	W	L	T	PTS	GF	GA	GP	W	L	T	GF	GA
Trinity †*	18	12	2	4	28	56	30	28	19	4	5	91	48
Wesleyan †	18	13	3	2	28	56	28	26	16	8	2	83	48
Amherst	18	10	4	4	24	55	36	26	15	7	4	74	52
Hamilton	18	10	5	3	23	53	52	26	13	10	3	70	72
Williams	18	10	6	2	22	51	41	25	14	9	2	73	60
Colby	18	7	7	4	18	50	45	25	10	10	5	64	65
Middlebury	18	5	9	4	14	44	51	25	8	13	4	60	71
Tufts	18	3	12	3	9	34	50	25	6	16	3	47	70
Bowdoin	18	3	14	1	7	35	69	24	6	16	2	59	95
Connecticut College	18	3	14	1	7	36	68	24	7	16	1	53	79
Championship: March 3, 2019 † indicates conference regular season champion * indicates conference tournament champion

2018–19 Northern Collegiate Hockey Association standings
	Conference							Overall					
	GP	W	L	T	PTS	GF	GA	GP	W	L	T	GF	GA
North
St. Norbert †*	18	14	3	1	29	83	31	31	23	5	3	131	53
Marian	18	11	5	2	24	38	28	28	14	10	4	63	59
Northland	18	9	7	2	20	59	55	27	12	13	2	80	93
Finlandia	18	6	10	2	14	41	58	27	8	17	2	56	97
St. Scholastica	18	6	11	1	13	54	71	25	11	13	1	76	87
Lawrence	18	3	13	2	8	39	76	25	5	18	2	47	95
South
Adrian	18	13	4	1	27	64	47	29	20	8	1	103	73
Lake Forest	18	9	5	4	22	57	39	28	12	10	6	81	69
Aurora	18	8	9	1	17	50	50	27	12	14	1	76	79
MSOE	18	7	8	3	17	51	52	27	10	13	4	72	84
Trine	18	6	11	1	13	45	59	25	10	13	2	64	70
Concordia (WI)	18	5	11	2	12	47	62	25	7	15	3	69	86
Championship: March 2, 2019 † indicates conference regular season champion * indicates conference tournament champion

2018–19 State University of New York Athletic Conference ice hockey standings
	Conference							Overall					
	GP	W	L	T	PTS	GF	GA	GP	W	L	T	GF	GA
Geneseo State †*	16	13	1	2	28	69	19	29	25	2	2	142	38
Oswego State	16	11	4	1	23	60	31	28	19	7	2	107	57
Plattsburgh State	16	10	5	1	21	50	32	27	13	12	2	70	65
Buffalo State	16	8	6	2	18	49	60	26	11	13	2	82	93
Fredonia State	16	8	6	2	18	45	51	27	15	8	4	77	74
Brockport State	16	7	7	2	16	45	40	26	15	9	2	77	53
Potsdam State	16	4	11	1	9	45	59	25	8	16	1	75	88
Cortland State	16	3	13	0	6	33	66	25	9	16	0	50	83
Morrisville State	16	2	13	1	5	32	70	25	4	19	2	57	108
Championship: March 2, 2019 † indicates conference regular season champion * indicates conference tournament champions

2018–19 United Collegiate Hockey Conference standings
	Conference								Overall					
	GP	W	L	T	SW	PTS	GF	GA	GP	W	L	T	GF	GA
Utica †	18	14	3	1	1	44	85	29	29	20	7	2	119	55
Elmira	18	12	4	2	0	38	76	55	27	14	9	4	96	89
Manhattanville *	18	11	4	3	1	37	78	54	32	18	9	5	125	97
Wilkes	18	11	5	2	2	37	64	51	26	16	8	2	96	76
Nazareth	18	8	5	5	1	30	54	45	28	12	9	7	82	68
Lebanon Valley	18	7	9	2	1	24	67	77	26	9	15	2	87	114
Neumann	18	5	9	4	1	23	62	59	25	6	15	4	77	89
Stevenson	18	7	11	0	0	21	53	56	25	10	15	0	61	73
Chatham	18	4	13	1	0	13	46	84	25	6	17	2	65	108
King's	18	1	17	0	0	3	24	99	25	1	24	0	30	133
Championship: March 3, 2019 † indicates conference regular season champion * indicates conference tournament champions

2018–19 Wisconsin Intercollegiate Athletic Conference ice hockey standings
	Conference							Overall					
	GP	W	L	T	PTS	GF	GA	GP	W	L	T	GF	GA
Wisconsin–Stevens Point †*	8	8	0	0	16	36	10	31	29	0	2	130	46
Wisconsin–Eau Claire	8	4	3	1	9	22	22	28	19	7	2	87	54
Wisconsin–Superior	8	3	3	2	8	13	18	27	10	14	3	69	77
Wisconsin–River Falls	8	1	4	3	5	19	25	28	12	11	5	72	72
Wisconsin–Stout	8	0	6	2	2	14	29	27	13	12	2	81	71
Championship: March 2, 2019 † indicates conference regular season champion * indicates conference tournament champion

Note: Mini-game are not included in final standings

== Player stats ==
=== Scoring leaders ===
GP = Games played; G = Goals; A = Assists; Pts = Points; PIM = Penalty minutes

Player	Class	Team	GP	G	A	Pts	PIM
Andrew Romano	Junior	Geneseo State	29	10	42	52	2
Conlan Keenan	Junior	Geneseo State	27	23	25	48	2
Matt Lippa	Senior	Manhattanville	32	21	27	48	12
Brady Fleurent	Senior	University of New England	30	13	35	48	12
Sascha Figi	Sophomore	Fitchburg State	26	25	21	46	14
Gregg Burmaster	Senior	Utica	29	20	26	46	4
Ryan Bloom	Junior	University of New England	29	22	21	43	2
Daniel Kucerovy	Senior	Endicott	26	17	25	42	30
Nick DiNicola	Senior	Fitchburg State	26	13	29	42	58
Josh Bowes	Senior	Endicott	26	19	22	41	18

=== Leading goaltenders ===
GP = Games played; Min = Minutes played; W = Wins; L = Losses; T = Ties; GA = Goals against; SO = Shutouts; SV% = Save percentage; GAA = Goals against average

Player	Class	Team	GP	Min	W	L	T	GA	SO	SV%	GAA
Devin McDonald	Junior	Geneseo State	27	1624	23	2	2	33	12	.940	1.22
Connor Ryckman	Sophomore	Wisconsin–Stevens Point	28	1630	26	0	1	39	3	.933	1.44
Teddy Loughborough	Junior	Trinity	18	1071	12	3	2	28	4	.940	1.57
Tim Sestak	Junior	Wesleyan	21	1290	14	5	2	34	7	.950	1.58
Michael Cullen	Sophomore	Amherst	15	927	9	4	1	25	1	.935	1.62
Liam Lascelle	Freshman	Hobart	15	876	10	2	2	24	4	.935	1.64
T.J. Black	Senior	St. Norbert	29	1729	22	5	2	49	6	.927	1.70
Tom Aubrun	Junior	Norwich	28	1588	20	4	3	45	6	.929	1.70
Gianluca Baggetta	Junior	Utica	22	1265	16	4	2	37	3	.941	1.76
Jonah Capriotti	Freshman	Trinity	11	663	7	1	3	20	2	.925	1.81

== 2019 NCAA Tournament ==
First Round; March 9
W2	St. Norbert	4*
W3	Augsburg	3
E4	Hobart	2
E9	Plymouth State	1
E6	Massachusetts–Boston	4
E7	Manhattanville	6
E5	Trinity	1
E8	University of New England	2

Quarterfinals; March 16
W1	Wisconsin–Stevens Point	3
W2	St. Norbert	0
E3	Oswego State	2
E4	Hobart	3
E1	Geneseo State	8
E7	Manhattanville	2
E2	Norwich	2
E8	University of New England	1

Semifinals; March 22
W1	Wisconsin–Stevens Point	5
E4	Hobart	3
E1	Geneseo State	2
E2	Norwich	4

National Championship; March 23
W1	Wisconsin–Stevens Point	3*
E2	Norwich	2

Note: * denotes overtime period(s)

== Awards ==
=== NCAA ===
Award		Recipient
Sid Watson Award		Devin McDonald, Geneseo State
Edward Jeremiah Award		Tyler Krueger, Wisconsin–Stevens Point
Tournament Most Outstanding Player		Tanner Karty, Wisconsin–Stevens Point
East First Team	Position	West First Team
Devin McDonald, Geneseo State	G	Connor Ryckman, Wisconsin–Stevens Point
Oscar Arfelt, Manhattanville	D	Luke Davison, St. Norbert
Duggie Lagrone, Geneseo State	D	Cory Dunn, Adrian
Brady Fleurent, University of New England	F	Riley Christensen, St. Norbert
Conlan Keenan, Geneseo State	F	Tanner Karty, Wisconsin–Stevens Point
Matt Lippa, Manhattanville	F	Alex Rodriguez, Augsburg
East Second Team	Position	West Second Team
Tim Sestak, Wesleyan	G	Hunter Vorva, Marian
Nick Albano, Massachusetts–Boston	D	Braden Hellems, Adrian
Phil Johansson, Amherst	D	John O'Connor, Augsburg
Connor Powell, Elmira	F	Tyler Bossert, Concordia (MN)
Nolan Redler, Massachusetts–Boston	F	Eddie Matsushima, Wisconsin–River Falls
Andrew Romano, Geneseo State	F	Roman Uchyn, St. Norbert
East Third Team	Position	
Tom Aubrun, Norwich	G	
Michael Grande, Trinity	D	
Max Novick, Oswego State	D	
Ryan Bloom, University of New England	F	
Sascha Figi, Fitchburg State	F	
Walker Harris, Wesleyan	F	

== See also ==
- 2018–19 NCAA Division I men's ice hockey season
- 2018–19 NCAA Division II men's ice hockey season
