= 2019–20 NCAA Division III men's ice hockey season =

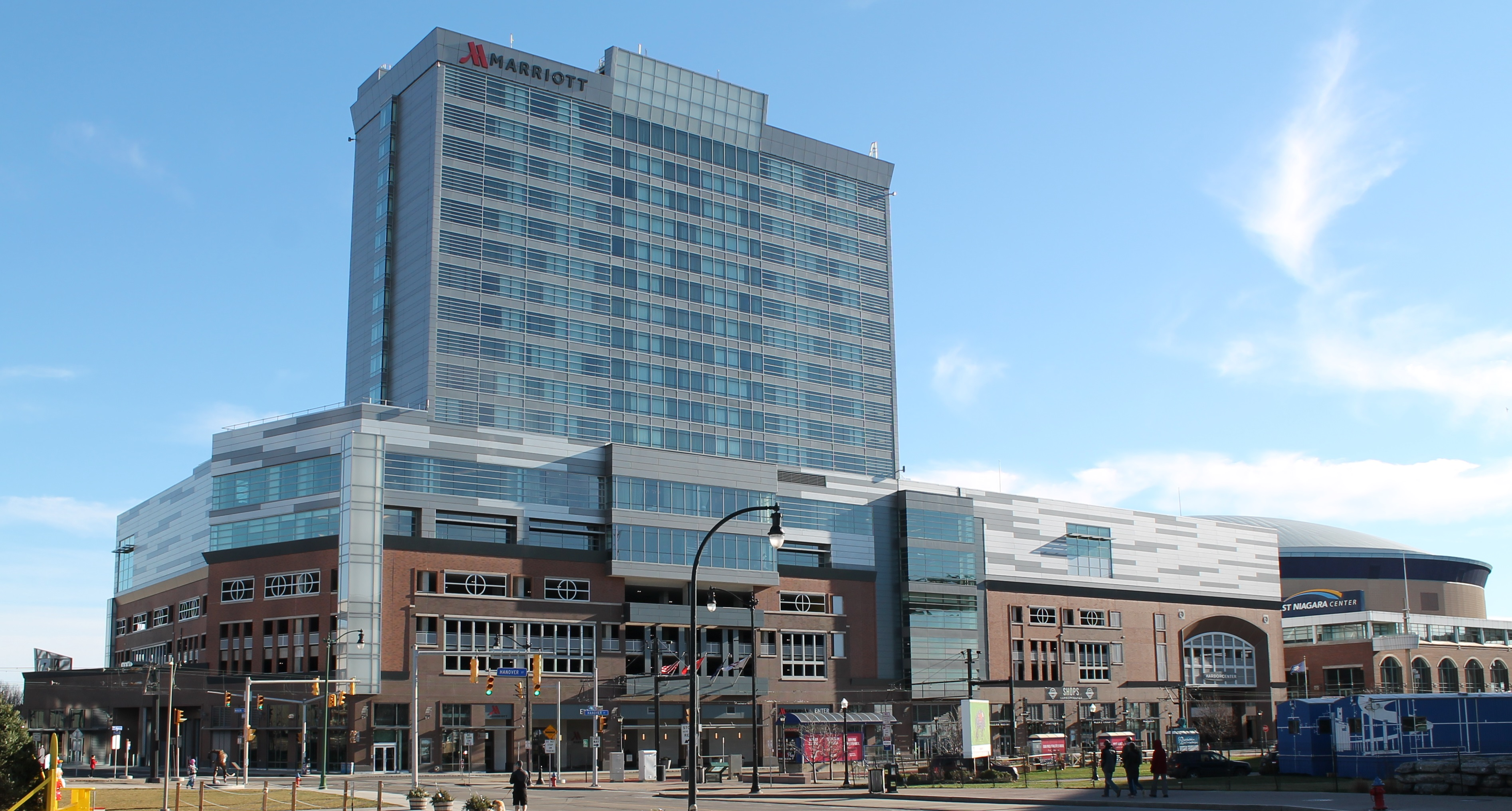
- The Harborcenter was scheduled to host the 2020 tournament
- Duration: November 1, 2019– March 8, 2020
- NCAA tournament: 2020
- National championship: LECOM Harborcenter; Buffalo, New York
- NCAA champion: None
- Sid Watson Award: Tom Aubrun (Norwich)

The 2019–20 NCAA Division III men's ice hockey season began on November 1, 2019, and concluded on March 8, 2020. This was the 47th season of Division III college ice hockey.

Two days before the National Tournament was set to begin, the championship, along with all other NCAA events for the spring semester, was cancelled due to the Coronavirus outbreak.

== Regular season ==
The Commonwealth Coast Conference, following the general trend of other conferences, altered its standings away from the traditional win–loss–tie format. Three points were now awarded for a win, one point for a tie and no points for a loss. The new method used was a convoluted arrangement where a team's conference record would still be recorded based upon the standard NCAA format where wins and losses accrued in the 5-minute 5-on-5 overtime were included in the win column. However, the CCC tracked overtime wins and losses so that if a team won a game in overtime they would receive two points instead of the normal three while if a team lost an overtime game they would receive a point. Teams that recorded a tie would follow a more typical situation where they would receive one additional point for a 3-on-3 overtime win or a shootout win but would not receive any additional points for a loss in either case.

The formula for the points standings were as follows: Points = (wins x 3) + (ties) – (5-on-5 overtime wins) + (5-on-5 overtime losses) + (3-on-3 overtime wins) + (shootout wins)

=== Season tournaments ===
Tournament	Dates	Teams	Champion
Buffalo State Tournament	November 1–2	4	Adrian
Castleton Invitational	November 29–30	4	Fredonia State
Primelink Great Northern Shootout	November 29–30	4	Wisconsin–Eau Claire
Thanksgiving Showcase	November 29–30	4	Utica
Bowdoin-Colby Faceoff Classic	November 30–December 1	4	Bowdoin
Saint Anselm Thanksgiving Tournament	November 30–December 1	4	Trinity
Skidmore Invitational	November 30–December 1	4	Skidmore
Steve Hoar Memorial	November 30–December 1	4	Franklin Pierce
PAL Cup	November 30–December 1	4	Wentworth
Superior Showdown	December 28–29	4	Marian
Codfish Bowl	January 3–4	4	Wesleyan
Middlebury Classic	January 3–4	4	Babson
Oswego State Hockey Classic	January 3–4	4	Saint Mary's
W.B. Mason Winter Classic	January 3–4	4	Elmira
Northfield Savings Bank Holiday Tournament	January 3–4	4	Cortland State
Boston Landing Invitational	January 4–5	4	Hobart

=== Standings ===
2019–20 Commonwealth Coast Conference ice hockey standings
	Conference										Overall					
	GP	W	L	T	OTW	OTL	3/SW	PTS	GF	GA	GP	W	L	T	GF	GA
University of New England †	18	14	2	2	0	0	2	46	97	36	26	18	5	3	126	54
Endicott †*	18	16	2	0	2	0	0	46	77	27	27	22	5	0	108	47
Curry	18	12	4	2	2	0	1	37	80	43	26	17	6	3	105	60
Salve Regina	18	10	7	1	1	1	0	31	62	56	26	14	11	1	91	89
Nichols	18	8	8	2	1	2	1	28	62	56	27	12	13	2	93	82
Wentworth	18	3	12	3	0	2	1	15	58	77	28	9	16	3	91	109
Becker	10	2	15	1	0	2	1	10	35	105	25	5	19	1	54	135
Western New England	18	1	16	1	1	0	0	3	32	96	25	3	20	2	49	116
Championship: March 7, 2020 † indicates conference regular season champion * indicates conference tournament champions

2019–20 NCAA Division III Independent ice hockey standings
	Overall record					
	GP	W	L	T	GF	GA
Albertus Magnus	24	4	18	2	45	101
Anna Maria	25	12	8	5	65	61
Bryn Athyn	25	12	10	3	81	77
Canton State	25	13	9	3	80	80

2019–20 Massachusetts State Collegiate Athletic Conference ice hockey standings
	Conference							Overall					
	GP	W	L	T	PTS	GF	GA	GP	W	L	T	GF	GA
Plymouth State †*	18	13	3	2	28	78	38	27	15	9	3	101	80
Fitchburg State	18	11	3	4	26	50	37	26	14	8	4	75	58
Massachusetts–Dartmouth	18	10	6	2	22	68	37	28	13	12	3	101	76
Westfield State	18	9	7	2	20	59	58	27	12	10	5	82	82
Salem State	18	4	9	5	13	40	66	26	4	15	7	58	97
Worcester State	18	4	13	1	9	42	63	26	6	18	2	61	95
Framingham State	18	3	13	2	8	38	76	25	4	18	3	51	102
Championship: March 7, 2020 † indicates conference regular season champion * indicates conference tournament champions

2019–20 Minnesota Intercollegiate Athletic Conference ice hockey standings
	Conference								Overall					
	GP	W	L	T	3/SW	PTS	GF	GA	GP	W	L	T	GF	GA
Saint John's †	16	9	3	4	2	33	55	35	26	12	9	5	85	72
Concordia (MN)	16	10	5	1	1	32	42	35	27	14	11	2	64	71
Augsburg	16	9	6	1	1	29	53	36	26	14	11	1	73	56
St. Thomas *	16	9	6	1	1	28	56	45	28	15	10	3	95	80
Gustavus Adolphus	16	7	7	2	2	25	54	38	26	11	12	3	79	64
Bethel	16	6	6	4	1	23	38	51	25	7	14	4	51	92
Saint Mary's	16	6	9	1	1	20	54	53	25	9	14	2	74	82
Hamline	16	4	9	3	1	16	35	61	25	6	15	4	54	91
St. Olaf	16	2	11	3	1	10	24	57	25	4	18	3	40	94
Championship: March 7, 2020 † indicates conference regular season champion * indicates conference tournament champion

2019–20 New England Hockey Conference standings
	Conference							Overall					
	GP	W	L	T	PTS	GF	GA	GP	W	L	T	GF	GA
Norwich †*	18	16	1	1	33	66	16	28	24	2	2	105	24
Babson	18	13	4	1	27	68	32	26	18	6	2	95	45
Hobart	18	12	4	2	26	83	43	28	20	5	3	116	63
New England College	18	12	6	0	24	76	57	27	17	9	1	110	81
Massachusetts–Boston	18	10	7	1	21	82	57	26	14	11	1	116	82
Skidmore	18	7	9	2	16	54	52	26	11	11	4	77	70
Southern Maine	18	6	10	2	14	44	59	27	8	16	3	62	93
Castleton	18	4	12	2	10	50	86	26	6	17	3	66	124
Suffolk	18	2	14	2	6	41	79	25	6	17	2	59	108
Johnson & Wales	18	1	16	1	3	32	115	25	4	20	1	55	138
Championship: March 7, 2020 † indicates conference regular season champion * indicates conference tournament champion

2019–20 New England Small College Athletic Conference ice hockey standings
	Conference							Overall					
	GP	W	L	T	PTS	GF	GA	GP	W	L	T	GF	GA
Williams †	18	13	5	0	26	59	35	26	17	8	1	83	56
Trinity	18	12	5	1	25	55	35	27	19	7	1	96	57
Hamilton	18	10	6	2	22	46	40	26	12	10	4	63	56
Middlebury	18	8	7	3	19	54	47	25	10	12	3	71	69
Wesleyan *	18	8	9	1	17	44	45	27	15	11	1	78	67
Bowdoin	18	8	9	1	17	49	60	25	12	12	1	71	80
Amherst	18	7	8	3	17	41	43	25	9	12	4	55	59
Connecticut College	18	7	9	2	16	35	41	25	11	12	2	61	60
Tufts	18	6	11	1	13	42	58	24	8	15	1	55	73
Colby	18	3	13	2	8	30	51	24	7	14	3	50	66
Championship: March 8, 2020 † indicates conference regular season champion * indicates conference tournament champion

2019–20 Northern Collegiate Hockey Association standings
	Conference							Overall					
	GP	W	L	T	PTS	GF	GA	GP	W	L	T	GF	GA
North
St. Norbert	20	13	7	0	26	73	51	28	18	9	1	102	72
Marian	20	11	7	2	24	73	45	29	17	10	2	113	66
Finlandia	20	5	13	2	12	38	71	27	6	19	2	55	109
St. Scholastica	20	5	14	1	11	46	79	27	9	17	1	62	95
Lawrence	20	3	15	2	8	33	95	25	5	18	2	43	108
South
Adrian †*	20	15	3	2	32	100	46	29	21	5	3	144	75
Lake Forest	20	14	4	2	30	78	48	27	18	6	3	104	66
Trine	20	10	7	3	23	58	53	28	13	12	3	80	80
Aurora	20	8	6	6	22	60	44	27	12	9	6	85	65
Concordia (WI)	20	8	10	2	18	66	78	25	12	11	2	90	95
MSOE	20	4	10	6	14	55	70	25	9	10	6	73	78
Championship: March 7, 2020 † indicates conference regular season champion * indicates conference tournament champion

2019–20 State University of New York Athletic Conference ice hockey standings
	Conference							Overall					
	GP	W	L	T	PTS	GF	GA	GP	W	L	T	GF	GA
Geneseo State †*	16	13	1	2	28	77	30	27	22	3	2	138	52
Oswego State	16	12	3	1	25	66	34	27	16	10	1	103	65
Buffalo State	16	8	7	1	17	48	40	26	12	12	2	79	68
Brockport State	16	8	7	1	17	41	42	26	15	10	1	77	74
Plattsburgh State	16	6	8	2	14	45	49	27	10	14	3	70	86
Potsdam State	16	5	9	2	12	46	58	27	7	18	2	74	106
Fredonia State	16	4	9	3	11	47	51	25	7	11	7	76	74
Cortland State	16	5	11	0	10	39	57	25	12	12	1	72	79
Morrisville State	16	5	11	0	10	32	80	25	9	16	0	53	111
Championship: March 7, 2020 † indicates conference regular season champion * indicates conference tournament champions

2019–20 United Collegiate Hockey Conference standings
	Conference								Overall					
	GP	W	L	T	3/SW	PTS	GF	GA	GP	W	L	T	GF	GA
Utica †*	18	15	2	1	0	46	100	33	29	25	2	2	147	57
Wilkes	18	14	4	0	0	42	81	56	29	19	10	0	126	94
Stevenson	18	13	4	1	0	40	78	46	28	18	8	2	120	84
Elmira	18	13	5	0	0	39	79	37	26	17	8	1	105	64
Nazareth	18	8	9	1	1	26	51	51	28	12	13	3	80	79
Neumann	18	8	10	0	0	24	57	72	26	9	17	0	84	116
Manhattanville	18	7	10	1	0	22	65	69	25	10	13	2	85	94
Lebanon Valley	18	3	11	4	2	15	38	61	25	5	16	4	51	80
Chatham	18	2	15	1	1	8	42	92	25	3	21	1	56	125
King's	18	2	15	1	1	8	26	100	25	3	21	1	38	131
Championship: March 7, 2020 † indicates conference regular season champion * indicates conference tournament champions

2019–20 Wisconsin Intercollegiate Athletic Conference ice hockey standings
	Conference								Overall					
	GP	W	L	T	OTL	PTS	GF	GA	GP	W	L	T	GF	GA
Wisconsin–Stevens Point †	15	10	2	3	0	23	67	34	28	18	7	3	116	67
Wisconsin–Eau Claire †*	15	11	3	1	0	23	51	28	28	22	4	2	103	46
Wisconsin–Superior	15	7	8	0	2	16	45	40	29	16	10	3	97	70
Wisconsin–River Falls	15	7	6	2	0	16	46	42	29	16	10	3	87	70
Wisconsin–Stout	15	6	9	0	1	13	43	58	27	8	18	1	68	102
Northland	15	1	14	0	0	2	25	75	27	4	22	1	56	112
Championship: March 7, 2020 † indicates conference regular season champion * indicates conference tournament champion

Note: Mini-game are not included in final standings

== Player stats ==
=== Scoring leaders ===
GP = Games played; G = Goals; A = Assists; Pts = Points; PIM = Penalty minutes

Player	Class	Team	GP	G	A	Pts	PIM
Andrew Romano	Senior	Geneseo State	27	14	42	56	16
Donny Flynn	Sophomore	Wilkes	27	27	24	51	90
Conlan Keenan	Senior	Geneseo State	27	27	24	51	20
Nick Fea	Sophomore	Wilkes	29	12	34	46	14
Mic Curran	Sophomore	Curry	26	11	35	46	14
Brandon Osmundson	Freshman	Utica	29	13	29	42	10
Carlos Fornaris	Senior	New England College	26	9	33	42	41
Nikita Pintusov	Sophomore	New England College	27	25	16	41	12
Conor Landrigan	Junior	Utica	22	13	28	41	20
Dean Balsamo	Senior	Adrian	29	19	21	40	22

=== Leading goaltenders ===
GP = Games played; Min = Minutes played; W = Wins; L = Losses; T = Ties; GA = Goals against; SO = Shutouts; SV% = Save percentage; GAA = Goals against average

Player	Class	Team	GP	Min	W	L	T	GA	SO	SV%	GAA
Tom Aubrun	Senior	Norwich	27	1629	23	2	2	21	14	.967	0.77
Brad Arvanitis	Junior	Babson	12	721	8	3	1	16	4	.954	1.33
Zach Dyment	Junior	Wisconsin–Eau Claire	24	1451	19	3	2	37	6	.935	1.53
Aidan Murphy	Sophomore	Babson	13	767	10	2	1	21	1	.942	1.64
Conor O'Brien	Sophomore	Endicott	26	1237	21	4	0	41	4	.944	1.66
Sean Storr	Sophomore	Hamilton	11	620	6	5	0	18	2	.931	1.74
Matt Petizian	Freshman	Geneseo State	11	1219	8	1	1	19	1	.906	1.77
Liam Lascelle	Sophomore	Hobart	10	578	8	2	0	18	2	.924	1.87
Colby Entz	Freshman	St. Norbert	18	1052	12	3	2	33	3	.930	1.88
Aaron MacKay	Junior	Geneseo State	17	975	14	2	1	31	2	.918	1.91

== 2020 NCAA Tournament ==
First Round; March 14
E6	Babson
E7	Wesleyan
W3	Lake Forest
W4	St. Thomas
E5	Endicott
E8	Plymouth State
W2	Adrian
E4	Hobart

Quarterfinals; March 21
E1	Utica (1)
W1	Wisconsin–Eau Claire (4)
E2	Norwich (2)
E3	Geneseo State (3)

Semifinals; March 27

National Championship; March 28

Note: * denotes overtime period(s)

== See also ==
- 2019–20 NCAA Division I men's ice hockey season
- 2019–20 NCAA Division II men's ice hockey season
