= NCAA Division III men's ice hockey tournament appearances by team =

The following is a list of National Collegiate Athletic Association (NCAA) Division III college ice hockey teams that have qualified for the NCAA Division III Men's Ice Hockey Championship as of 2026 with teams listed by number of appearances.

NCAA men's Division III ice hockey tournament
School	Tournament appearances	Tournament years	Best result
St. Norbert	23	1997, 1998, 1999, 2002, 2003, 2004, 2005, 2006, 2007, 2008, 2010, 2011, 2012, 2013, 2014, 2016, 2017, 2018, 2019, 2022, 2024, 2025, 2026	Champion (2008, 2011, 2012, 2014, 2018)
Norwich	21	1987, 1997, 1999, 2000, 2002, 2003, 2004, 2006, 2007, 2008, 2010, 2011, 2012, 2013, 2014, 2015, 2017, 2019, 2020, 2023, 2026	Champion (2000, 2003, 2010, 2017)
Plattsburgh State	20	1985, 1986†, 1987†, 1988†, 1990, 1992, 1993, 1995, 1997, 1998, 1999, 2000, 2001, 2002, 2004, 2008, 2009, 2010, 2011, 2012, 2015, 2017, 2023	Champion (1992, 2001)
Wisconsin–Stevens Point	17	1988, 1989, 1990, 1991, 1992, 1993, 1994, 1995, 1998, 2014, 2015, 2016, 2017, 2018, 2019, 2023, 2024	Champion (1989, 1990, 1991, 1993, 2016, 2019)
Oswego State	17	1984, 1987, 1988, 1989, 1991, 1998, 2003, 2007, 2010, 2011, 2012, 2013, 2014, 2015, 2017, 2019, 2025	Champion (2007)
St. Thomas	17	1984, 1985, 1986, 1988, 1990, 1992, 1994, 1999, 2000, 2002, 2004, 2005, 2008, 2010, 2012, 2014, 2020	Runner-Up (2000, 2005)
Elmira	17	1986, 1988, 1990, 1991, 1992, 1993, 1994, 1997, 2003, 2006, 2008, 2009, 2010, 2011, 2012, 2022, 2024	Runner-Up (1988)
Babson	16	1984, 1985, 1986, 1987, 1988, 1989, 1990, 1991, 1992, 1993, 2007, 2009, 2013, 2014, 2020, 2022	Champion (1984)
Hobart	15	2004, 2006, 2008, 2009, 2015, 2016, 2017, 2018, 2019, 2020, 2022, 2023, 2024, 2025, 2026	Champion (2023, 2024, 2025)
Middlebury	14	1995, 1996, 1997, 1998, 1999, 2000, 2001, 2002, 2003, 2004, 2005, 2006, 2007, 2010	Champion (1995, 1996, 1997, 1998, 1999, 2004, 2005, 2006)
Wisconsin–Superior	13	1992, 1993, 1994, 1995, 1996, 1997, 1999, 2000, 2001, 2002, 2006, 2009, 2011	Champion (2002)
RIT	12	1984, 1985, 1986, 1989, 1994, 1996, 1997, 1998, 1999, 2000, 2001, 2002	Champion (1985)
Adrian	12	2010, 2011, 2013, 2014, 2015, 2016, 2017, 2018, 2020, 2022, 2023, 2024	Champion (2022)
Wisconsin–River Falls	11	1984, 1988, 1993, 1994, 1995, 1996, 1998, 2001, 2003, 2004, 2007	Champion (1988, 1994)
Geneseo State	11	1990, 2005, 2006, 2014, 2016, 2018, 2019, 2020, 2022, 2024, 2025	Runner-Up (2022)
Trinity	9	2003, 2005, 2008, 2015, 2016, 2017, 2019, 2022, 2024	Champion (2015)
Salem State	9	1985, 1987, 1992, 1993, 1994, 1995, 2014, 2016, 2017	Frozen Four (1992, 1994)
Augsburg	8	1984, 1998, 2016, 2017, 2018, 2019, 2022, 2023	Frozen Four (1984, 1998, 2022)
Gustavus Adolphus	7	1990, 1991, 1993, 2009, 2010, 2012, 2025	Runner-Up (2009)
Utica	7	2013, 2020, 2022, 2023, 2024, 2025, 2026	Runner-Up (2025)
Saint John's	7	1996, 1997, 2001, 2003, 2005, 2013, 2026	Frozen Four (1997)
Curry	7	2004, 2005, 2010, 2011, 2023, 2024, 2025	Frozen Four (2025)
Bowdoin	7	1996, 2002, 2010, 2011, 2013, 2014, 2023	Quarterfinals (1996, 2002, 2010, 2011, 2013)
Plymouth State	7	2012, 2015, 2019, 2020, 2022, 2023, 2024	Quarterfinals (2024)
University of New England	6	2018, 2019, 2022, 2023, 2025, 2026	Frozen Four (2022, 2023)
Wentworth	6	2000, 2002, 2003, 2004, 2012, 2013	Quarterfinals (2000, 2002, 2003, 2004, 2012)
Bemidji State	5	1985, 1986, 1987, 1988, 1989	Champion (1986)
Mankato State	5	1985, 1986, 1990, 1991, 1992	Runner-Up (1991)
Manhattanville	5	2005, 2006, 2007, 2008, 2019	Frozen Four (2007)
Wisconsin–Eau Claire	4	1989, 2013, 2020, 2025	Champion (2013)
Union	4	1984, 1985, 1986, 1989	Runner-Up (1984)
Amherst	4	1999, 2009, 2012, 2015	Frozen Four (2012, 2015)
Endicott	5	2017, 2020, 2023, 2024, 2026	Frozen Four (2023)
Massachusetts Dartmouth	4	2006, 2007, 2008, 2013	Quarterfinals (2006, 2007, 2008)
Nichols	4	2009, 2014, 2015, 2018	Quarterfinals (2018)
Neumann	3	2009, 2011, 2026	Champion (2009)
Hamilton	3	2017, 2025, 2026	Champion (2026)
Salve Regina	3	2016, 2018, 2026	Runner-Up (2018)
Fredonia State	3	1994, 1995, 2007	Runner-Up (1995)
Wisconsin–Stout	3	2008, 2009, 2026	Frozen Four (2009, 2026)
New England College	3	1984, 2001, 2005	Frozen Four (2005)
St. Olaf	3	2006, 2022, 2024	First Round (2006, 2022, 2024)
Massachusetts Boston	2	2016, 2019	Frozen Four (2016)
Colby	2	1996, 2018	Frozen Four (2018)
Aurora	2	2025, 2026	Frozen Four (2026)
Concordia (MN)	2	1987, 2000	Quarterfinals (1987, 2000)
Saint Mary's	2	1989, 1995	Quarterfinals (1989, 1995)
Hamline	2	2011, 2015	Quarterfinals (2011, 2015)
Lake Forest	2	1991, 2020	Quarterfinals (1991)
Williams	2	2016, 2026	Quarterfinals (2016)
Fitchburg State	2	2018, 2025	First Round (2018, 2025)
St. Cloud State	1	1987	Frozen Four (1987)
Mercyhurst	1	1991	Quarterfinals (1991)
Potsdam State	1	1996	Quarterfinals (1996)
Lebanon Valley	1	2001	Quarterfinals (2001)
Bethel	1	2007	Quarterfinals (2007)
St. Scholastica	1	2009	Quarterfinals (2009)
Trine	1	2025	Quarterfinals (2025)
MSOE	1	2012	First Round (2012)
Marian	1	2018	First Round (2018)
Cortland State	1	2024	First Round (2024)
Stevenson	1	2025	First Round (2025)
Anna Maria	1	2026	First Round (2026)
Wesleyan	1	2020	Tournament Cancelled (2020)

† Plattsburgh State's appearances from 1986 through 1988 were later vacated due to NCAA rules violations.
