= Terry Skrypek =

American ice hockey player and coach (born 1948)

Biographical details
- Born: January 14, 1948 (age 78); Saint Paul, Minnesota, U.S.

Playing career
- 1966–1970: Saint Mary's (MN)
- Position: Center

Coaching career (HC unless noted)
- 1970–1987: Hill-Murray School
- 1987–2010: St. Thomas

Head coaching record
- Overall: 415–194–45 (college)
- Tournaments: 8–14–3

Accomplishments and honors

Awards
- Edward Jeremiah Award (2005)

Terry Skrypek (born January 14, 1948) is an American retired ice hockey center and coach who won the Division III National Coach of Year in 2005.

== Career ==
Skrypek began his collegiate career at Saint Mary's College, just south east of his home town, and was a key player for the Cardinals over his four-year career. He was twice named to the All-MIAC team and led the team in scoring as a senior while Saint Mary's earned three second-place finishes.

After graduating he immediately jumped into coaching, taking over at the Hill-Murray School. Skrypek built the program into a powerhouse for Minnesota Hockey; in 17 seasons he took his team to 12 state tournaments, ending as runners-up on three occasions and winning the 1983 State Championship. After compiling a record of 325–44–3 (.878), Skrypek jumped at the chance to coach collegiate hockey and accepted the job at St. Thomas. The team had been a middling program for most of its history but since the early 80's its profile had been on the ascent. St. Thomas had made three national tournament appearances but failed to make it out of the quarterfinals each season.

For the first decade of his tenure very little changed on the national circuit but the Tommies established themselves as the dominant power of the MIAC, winning 7 consecutive conference titles. In 2000 Skrypek produced the best season in program history, going 27–4–2 and got out of the first round of the NCAA tournament for the first time. The Tommies made their first championship appearance that season but fell 1–2 to Norwich. Five years later the Tommies made their second run in the tournament, again coming up shy, but this time Skrypek was recognized for his accomplishments, receiving the Edward Jeremiah Award for his outstanding coaching performance.

Skrypek retired as a coach following the 2010 season, ending with over 700 victories in both high school and college hockey. He was inducted into the Saint Mary's Athletic Hall of Fame in 2003, and received the Cliff Thompson Award in 2014 for his outstanding contribution to Minnesota Hockey.

== Statistics ==
=== Regular season and playoffs ===
			Regular season					Playoffs
Season	Team	League	GP	G	A	Pts	PIM	GP	G	A	Pts	PIM
1966–67	Saint Mary's	MIAC	20	7	12	19	—	—	—	—	—	—
1967–68	Saint Mary's	MIAC	20	12	15	27	—	—	—	—	—	—
1968–69	Saint Mary's	MIAC	19	18	27	45	—	—	—	—	—	—
1969–70	Saint Mary's	MIAC	19	16	23	39	14	—	—	—	—	—
NCAA totals			78	53	77	130	—	—	—	—	—	—

== College head coaching record ==
Record table
Season	Team	Overall	Conference	Standing	Postseason
St. Thomas Tommies (MIAC) (1987–2010)
1987–88	St. Thomas	21–10–0	13–3–0	2nd	NCAA Quarterfinals
1988–89	St. Thomas	18–11–1	13–3–0	1st	MIAC Runner-Up
1989–90	St. Thomas	19–8–1	14–2–0	1st	NCAA Quarterfinals
1990–91	St. Thomas	18–8–3	13–1–2	1st	MIAC Runner-Up
1991–92	St. Thomas	20–10–2	12–3–1	1st	NCAA Quarterfinals
1992–93	St. Thomas	18–8–1	13–2–1	T–1st	MIAC Runner-Up
1993–94	St. Thomas	17–4–4	11–2–3	1st	NCAA Quarterfinals
1994–95	St. Thomas	16–8–1	12–3–1	1st	MIAC Runner-Up
1995–96	St. Thomas	18–9–2	11–3–2	3rd	MIAC Runner-Up
1996–97	St. Thomas	18–9–0	13–3–0	2nd	MIAC Semifinals
1997–98	St. Thomas	20–7–2	12–3–1	1st	MIAC Runner-Up
1998–99	St. Thomas	16–12–3	11–4–1	1st	NCAA Quarterfinals
1999–00	St. Thomas	27–4–2	14–1–1	1st	NCAA Runner-Up
2000–01	St. Thomas	15–9–3	11–3–2	1st	MIAC Semifinals
2001–02	St. Thomas	22–6–0	13–3–0	1st	NCAA First Round
2002–03	St. Thomas	16–9–2	10–5–1	2nd	MIAC Runner-Up
2003–04	St. Thomas	17–8–3	13–2–1	2nd	NCAA First Round
2004–05	St. Thomas	20–6–5	12–3–1	2nd	NCAA Runner-Up
2005–06	St. Thomas	17–9–1	13–2–1	1st	MIAC Runner-Up
2006–07	St. Thomas	17–10–0	12–4–0	2nd	MIAC Runner-Up
2007–08	St. Thomas	20–7–2	11–4–1	T–2nd	NCAA Quarterfinals
2008–09	St. Thomas	12–11–3	9–5–2	3rd	MIAC Semifinals
2009–10	St. Thomas	13–11–4	8–6–2	3rd	NCAA First Round
St. Thomas:		415–194–45	274–70–24		
Total:		415–194–45			
National champion Postseason invitational champion Conference regular season champion Conference regular season and conference tournament champion Division regular season champion Division regular season and conference tournament champion Conference tournament champion

== See also ==
- List of college men's ice hockey coaches with 400 wins

Awards and achievements
Preceded by Bill Beaney	Edward Jeremiah Award; 2005	Succeeded by Bill Beaney
