= Steve Freeman (ice hockey) =

American ice hockey coach

Current position
- Title: Head coach
- Team: Wisconsin–River Falls
- Conference: WIAC

Biographical details
- Born: New Brighton, Minnesota, USA
- Education: University of Wisconsin–Stevens Point; University of Wisconsin–River Falls

Coaching career (HC unless noted)
- 1987–1989: Dubuque Fighting Saints
- 1989–1996: Wisconsin–River Falls (assistant)
- 1996–Present: Wisconsin–River Falls

Head coaching record
- Overall: 410–233–61 (.626)

Accomplishments and honors

Championships
- 2007 NCHA regular season champion 2014 WIAC regular season champion 2015 WIAC tournament champion 2016 WIAC regular season champion 2021 WIAC regular season champion

Steve Freeman is an American men's college ice hockey coach. He has been the men's ice hockey head coach at Wisconsin–River Falls since 1996.

== Early life and education ==
Freeman was born in New Brighton, Minnesota. In his youth, he played on the hockey team at Irondale High School and for the Minneapolis Junior Bruins. He earned a bachelor's degree from the University of Wisconsin–Stevens Point and a master's degree in education and professional development from University of Wisconsin–River Falls.

== Career ==
After graduating from college, Freeman became the head coach at Stevens Point Area Senior High School (SPASH) and led the team to four conference championships. The performance brought Freeman recognition for his talent and he was brought in as the head coach/GM of the Dubuque Fighting Saints. After two rather poor years with the team, Freeman left and became an assistant at University of Wisconsin–Stevens Point
University of Wisconsin–River Falls under Dean Talafous. While there, he earned a master's in education and helped the Falcons win the 1994 NCAA Championship, defeating previously unbeaten Fredonia State in the semifinals.

After Talafous left in 1996, Freeman was promoted to head coach and had remained in that position since (as of 2021). Freeman's teams were often the second best in the NCHA but, because of the small number of at-large bids available, that wasn't always enough to earn the Falcons an appearance in the NCAA Tournament. River Falls made the Frozen four in 2001 but the team had spent most of the time in the shadow of the conference's dominant power, St. Norbert.

In 2013, all five active WIAC teams left to form a new conference when the WIAC began sponsoring ice hockey as a sport. While this did provide more opportunity for Freeman's team, it also came at a price. Because the new conference didn't possess the minimum number of teams required to receive an automatic tournament berth (7), WIAC teams could only qualify for the national tournament based upon their record. Because of this, even when the Falcons won the conference championship in 2015 they were left sitting on the sidelines because the NCAA tournament didn't have to invite River Falls. Instead, Wisconsin–Stevens Point, who had won the regular season title and finished as the conference runners-up, were selected to participate.

In 2021, with many Division III teams not playing due to the COVID-19 pandemic, Freeman led the Falcons to a conference title in an abbreviated season. Before the team could play their first playoff game, virus protocols forced the team to withdraw from the tournament.

Freeman was inducted into the Wisconsin Sports Hall of Fame in 2016.

== Head coaching record ==
Record table
Season	Team	Overall	Conference	Standing	Postseason
Wisconsin–River Falls Falcons (NCHA) (1996–2013)
1996–97	Wisconsin–River Falls	20–11–0	13–7–0	5th	NCHA runner-up
1997–98	Wisconsin–River Falls	22–8–1	14–5–1	2nd	NCAA Quarterfinals
1998–99	Wisconsin–River Falls	22–9–0	12–4–0	2nd	NCHA runner-up
1999–00	Wisconsin–River Falls	16–9–4	8–4–2	4th	NCHA Semifinals
2000–01	Wisconsin–River Falls	23–10–2	10–4–0	2nd	NCAA third-place game (loss)
2001–02	Wisconsin–River Falls	18–9–2	7–5–2	4th	NCHA Semifinals
2002–03	Wisconsin–River Falls	23–7–1	11–2–1	T–2nd	NCAA Quarterfinals
2003–04	Wisconsin–River Falls	21–6–4	8–3–3	2nd	NCAA Quarterfinals
2004–05	Wisconsin–River Falls	17–9–2	9–5–0	3rd	NCHA Semifinals
2005–06	Wisconsin–River Falls	17–7–3	9–4–1	2nd	NCHA Quarterfinals
2006–07	Wisconsin–River Falls	21–6–2	10–3–1	T–1st	NCAA first round
2007–08	Wisconsin–River Falls	16–7–4	8–5–1	2nd	NCHA Quarterfinals
2008–09	Wisconsin–River Falls	10–15–2	4–9–1	6th	NCHA Quarterfinals
2009–10	Wisconsin–River Falls	18–9–2	9–7–2	3rd	NCHA runner-up
2010–11	Wisconsin–River Falls	12–14–2	7–10–1	6th	NCHA Semifinals
2011–12	Wisconsin–River Falls	16–9–2	10–6–2	T–2nd	NCHA Quarterfinals
2012–13	Wisconsin–River Falls	13–11–4	5–9–4	6th	NCHA Semifinals
Wisconsin–River Falls:		305–156–37	154–92–22		
Wisconsin–River Falls Falcons (WIAC) (2013–present)
2013–14	Wisconsin–River Falls	15–9–3	8–4–0	1st	WIAC Semifinals
2014–15	Wisconsin–River Falls	20–7–1	7–5–0	3rd	WIAC Semifinals
2015–16	Wisconsin–River Falls	16–7–5	5–2–1	T–1st	WIAC Runner-Up
2016–17	Wisconsin–River Falls	12–13–2	3–4–1	3rd	WIAC Semifinals
2017–18	Wisconsin–River Falls	8–17–4	1–6–1	5th	WIAC Semifinals
2018–19	Wisconsin–River Falls	12–11–5	1–4–3	4th	WIAC Semifinals
2019–20	Wisconsin–River Falls	16–10–3	7–6–2	T–3rd	WIAC Semifinals
2020–21	Wisconsin–River Falls	6–3–1	6–3–1	1st	WIAC withdrawal
Wisconsin–River Falls:		105–77–24	38–34–9		
Total:		410–233–61			
National champion Postseason invitational champion Conference regular season champion Conference regular season and conference tournament champion Division regular season champion Division regular season and conference tournament champion Conference tournament champion

== See also ==
- List of college men's ice hockey coaches with 400 wins
