= NCAA Division III men's ice hockey tournament Most Outstanding Player =

Tournament Most Outstanding Player
- Sport: Ice hockey
- Awarded for: To the player who is judged to be the most outstanding player over the course of the NCAA tournament.

History
- First award: 1984
- Most recent: Kahlil Fontana (Hobart)

The tournament Most Outstanding Player is an annual award given out at the conclusion of the NCAA Division III Men's Ice Hockey Championship to the player to be judged the most outstanding. The award was first conferred in 1984 but was retired after the 1990 championship. The award was resurrected in 2009 and has been given out annually since (as of 2019).

As of 2020, only one player has won the award multiple times (B. J. O'Brian) who, coincidentally, is also the only player to win the award while not playing for the national champion. The 2020 and 2021 tournaments were cancelled due to the COVID-19 pandemic in the United States, as a result no tournament Most Outstanding Player was awarded.

== Award winners ==
Year	Winner	Position	School
1984	Paul Donato	Forward	Babson
1985	Chet Hallice	Goaltender	RIT
1986	Mike Alexander	Forward	Bemidji State
1987	Vacated †		
1988	Not Awarded		
1989	Shawn Wheeler	Forward	Wisconsin–Stevens Point
1990	Paul Caufield	Forward	Wisconsin–Stevens Point
1991–2008 Award retired
2009	Ross MacKinnon	Goaltender	Neumann
2010	B. J. O'Brien*	Goaltender	St. Norbert
2011	B. J. O'Brien	Goaltender	St. Norbert
2012	David Jacobson	Goaltender	St. Norbert
2013	Jordan Singer	Forward	Wisconsin–Eau Claire

Year	Winner	Position	School
2014	Joe Perry	Forward	St. Norbert
2015	Nathaniel Heilbron	Goaltender	Trinity
2016	Eliot Grauer	Forward	Wisconsin–Stevens Point
2017	William Pelletier	Forward	Norwich
2018	Tanner Froese	Forward	St. Norbert
2019	Tanner Karty	Forward	Wisconsin–Stevens Point
2020	Cancelled due to the COVID-19 pandemic		
2021	Cancelled due to the COVID-19 pandemic		
2022	Sam Ruffin	Forward	Adrian
2023	Damon Beaver	Goaltender	Hobart
2024	Austin Mourar	Defenseman	Hobart
2025	Kahlil Fontana	Forward	Hobart

† Chris Panek was the Tournament MOP in 1987 but the award was rescinded when Plattsburgh State's appearance was vacated as a result of NCAA rules violations.
* Player was not a member of the championship team.

== Award Breakdown ==
Winners by school
School	Winners
St. Norbert	5
Wisconsin–Stevens Point	4
Hobart	3
Adrian	1
Babson	1
Bemidji State	1
Neumann	1
Norwich	1
RIT	1
Trinity	1
Wisconsin–Eau Claire	1

Winners by position
Position	Winners
Forward	11
Defenceman	1
Goaltender	7
