= Dominick Dawes =

American ice hockey coach (born 1980)

Current position
- Title: Head coach
- Team: Stevenson
- Conference: UCHC

Biographical details
- Born: December 20, 1980 (age 45); Utica, New York, U.S.
- Education: Norwich University

Playing career
- 2000–2004: Norwich
- 2004–2005: Macon Trax
- 2005–2006: Florida Seals
- Position: Defenseman

Coaching career (HC unless noted)
- 2006–2008: Hamilton (asst.)
- 2008–2015: Neumann
- 2015–present: Stevenson

Head coaching record
- Overall: 168–110–37 (.592)
- Tournaments: 4–0 (1.000)

Accomplishments and honors

Championships
- 2009 ECAC West tournament champion 2009 NCAA National Champion; 2013 ECAC West tournament champion

Awards
- 2009 Edward Jeremiah Award

Dominick Dawes (born December 20, 1980) is an American ice hockey coach and former player who was the NCAA Division III coach of the year in 2009.

== Career ==
Dawes played for Thomas R. Proctor High School in Utica, New York. Upon graduating, Dawes played four years at Norwich for head coach Mike McShane. In his junior season, Dawes helped the Cadets win the program's second National Championship. After graduating with a degree in business management, Dawes played two years of professional hockey in the low-level Southern Professional Hockey League where he lost every fight he was in before retiring as a player.

In 2006, Dawes began his coaching career, first serving as an assistant at Hamilton. After two years, he was named as the head coach for Neumann and looked to help the 10-year-old program continue to improve. In his first season, Dawes led the Knights to a respectable record but the team shone once the postseason began. Neumann won three games to win its first ever conference tournament and earned an automatic bid to the NCAA tournament. Neumann received the fifth eastern seed and played its first tournament game against conference rival Elmira. After a narrow win in the first round, they took down #1 overall seed Plattsburgh State 5–4 in overtime. The Knights continued their magical run with a 2–0 shutout in the national semifinal and then pulled off probably the most surprising championship victory when they downed Gustavus Adolphus in the final. Dawes was named as the National Division III coach of the year and became just the second person to win a D-III title as both a player and a coach, the first being Tim Coghlin.

After the title, Dawes began taking classes at Neumann and earned a master's in strategic leadership. Dawes continued to lead his team to winning records in each of the next four seasons, capturing a second conference championship in 2013. Unfortunately, because the ECAC West had lost its automatic qualifier due to a lack of membership programs, he wasn't able to get Neumann back to the NCAA Tournament. In 2015, Dawes left Neumann to become the first head coach for the program at Stevenson, which would begin play the following year. Despite being a brand new team, the Mustangs played well out of the gate, posting a winning record in just their second year and finishing near the top of the conference more often than not.

== Statistics ==
=== Regular season and playoffs ===
| | | | Regular Season | | | | | Playoffs |
| Season | Team | League | GP | G | A | Pts | PIM | GP | G | A | Pts | PIM |
|---|---|---|---|---|---|---|---|---|---|---|---|---|
| 2000–01 | Norwich | ECAC East | 23 | 6 | 5 | 11 | 10 | — | — | — | — | — |
| 2001–02 | Norwich | ECAC East | 25 | 4 | 6 | 10 | 6 | — | — | — | — | — |
| 2002–03 | Norwich | ECAC East | 25 | 5 | 7 | 12 | 22 | — | — | — | — | — |
| 2003–04 | Norwich | ECAC East | 28 | 1 | 13 | 14 | 14 | — | — | — | — | — |
| 2004–05 | Macon Trax | SPHL | 56 | 6 | 24 | 30 | 92 | 5 | 0 | 1 | 1 | 0 |
| 2005–06 | Florida Seals | SPHL | 56 | 9 | 12 | 21 | 71 | 9 | 0 | 2 | 2 | 22 |
| NCAA totals | | | 101 | 16 | 31 | 47 | 52 | — | — | — | — | — |
| SPHL totals | | | 112 | 15 | 36 | 51 | 163 | 14 | 0 | 3 | 3 | 22 |

== Head coaching record ==
Record table
| Season | Team | Overall | Conference | Standing | Postseason |
|---|---|---|---|---|---|
Neumann Knights (ECAC West) (2008–2015)
| 2008–09 | Neumann | 21–9–2 | 8–5–2 | 4th | NCAA National Champion |
| 2009–10 | Neumann | 15–9–3 | 7–5–3 | 4th | ECAC West Semifinal |
| 2010–11 | Neumann | 14–9–5 | 7–4–1 | 2nd | ECAC West Runner-Up |
| 2011–12 | Neumann | 15–8–3 | 3–6–3 | 5th | ECAC West Runner-Up |
| 2012–13 | Neumann | 19–6–3 | 8–6–1 | 3rd | ECAC West Champion |
| 2013–14 | Neumann | 9–12–5 | 4–8–3 | 5th | ECAC West Quarterfinal |
| 2014–15 | Neumann | 14–9–4 | 9–5–1 | 2nd | ECAC West Runner-Up |
| Neumann: | | 107–62–25 | 46–39–14 | | |
Stevenson Mustangs (ECAC West) (2016–2017)
| 2016–17 | Stevenson | 10–14–2 | 4–9–1 | 6th | ECAC West Quarterfinal |
| Stevenson: | | 10–14–2 | 4–9–1 | | |
Stevenson Mustangs (UCHC) (2017–present)
| 2017–18 | Stevenson | 11–8–7 | 9–3–4 | T–2nd | UCHC Semifinals |
| 2018–19 | Stevenson | 10–15–0 | 7–11–0 | 8th | |
| 2019–20 | Stevenson | 18–8–2 | 13–4–1 | 3rd | UCHC Semifinals |
| 2020–21 | Stevenson | 12–3–1 | 7–1–1 | 2nd | UCHC Runner-Up |
| Stevenson: | | 51–34–10 | 36–19–6 | | |
| Total: | | 168–110–37 | | | |
National champion Postseason invitational champion Conference regular season champion Conference regular season and conference tournament champion Division regular season champion Division regular season and conference tournament champion Conference tournament champion

Awards and achievements
| Preceded by Tim Coghlin | Edward Jeremiah Award; 2008–09 | Succeeded by Mike McShane |
