= 1991 NCAA Division III men's ice hockey tournament =

- Teams: 8
- Finals site: Murray Athletic Center, Elmira, New York
- Champions: Wisconsin–Stevens Point Pointers (3rd title)
- Runner-up: Mankato State (1st title game)
- Semifinalists: Babson Beavers (5th Frozen Four); Elmira Soaring Eagles (2nd Frozen Four)
- Winning coach: Mark Mazzoleni (3rd title)
- Attendance: 16,701

The 1991 NCAA Division III men's ice hockey tournament was the culmination of the 1990–91 season, the 8th such tournament in NCAA history. It concluded with Wisconsin-Stevens Point defeating Mankato State in the championship game 6-2. All Quarterfinals matchups were held at home team venues, while all succeeding games were played in Elmira, New York.

The NCAA stopped awarding the Tournament Most Outstanding Player with this tournament. The next tournament MOP would be awarded in 2009.

== Qualifying teams ==
The following teams qualified for the tournament. There were no automatic bids, however, conference tournament champions were given preferential consideration. No formal seeding was used, quarterfinal matches were arranged so that the road teams would have the shortest possible travel distances.

East						West					
School	Conference	Record	Berth Type	Appearance	Last Bid	School	Conference	Record	Berth Type	Appearance	Last Bid
Babson	ECAC East	17–7–0	At-Large	8th	1990	Gustavus Adolphus	MIAC	17–5–2	Tournament Champion	2nd	1990
Elmira	ECAC West	26–3–0	Tournament Champion	4th	1990	Lake Forest	Independent	18–4–1	At-Large	1st	Never
Mercyhurst	ECAC West	18–11–1	At-Large	1st	Never	Mankato State	NCHA	21–5–6	At-Large	4th	1990
Oswego State	ECAC West	14–11–1	At-Large	5th	1989	Wisconsin–Stevens Point	NCHA	23–9–0	Tournament Champion	4th	1990

== Format ==
In 1991, the tournament returned to the format it had used from 1984-1987. The tournament featured three rounds of play. In the Quarterfinals, two-game series where the first team to reach 3 points was declared a winner (2 points for winning a game, 1 point each for tying). If both teams ended up with 2 points after the first two games a 20-minute mini-game used to determine a winner. Mini-game scores are in italics. Beginning with the semifinals all games became Single-game eliminations. The winning teams in the semifinals advanced to the National Championship Game with the losers playing in a Third Place game. The teams were seeded according to geographic proximity in the quarterfinals so the visiting team would have the shortest feasible distance to travel.

== Bracket ==
Quarterfinals; March 8–10
Wisconsin–Stevens Point	9	6	-
Lake Forest	1	3	-
Babson	4	10	-
Oswego State	1	4	-
Mercyhurst	5	6	1
Elmira	4	7	2*
Mankato State	4	7	-
Gustavus Adolphus	4	2	-

Semifinals; March 15
Wisconsin–Stevens Point	5
Babson	2
Elmira	3
Mankato State	7

National championship March 16
Wisconsin–Stevens Point	6
Mankato State	2
Third-place game
Babson	3
Elmira	2

Note: * denotes overtime period(s)
Note: Mini-games in italics

== Record by conference ==
Conference	# of Bids	Record	Win %	Frozen Four	Championship Game	Champions
ECAC West	3	2–6–0	.250	1	-	-
NCHA	2	6–1–1	.813	2	2	1
ECAC East	1	3–1–0	.750	1	-	-
MIAC	1	0–1–1	.250	-	-	-
Independent	1	0–2–0	.000	-	-	-
