= 1996 NCAA Division III men's ice hockey tournament =

- Teams: 8
- Finals site: W.H. Hunt Arena; River Falls, Wisconsin
- Champions: Middlebury Panthers (2nd title)
- Runner-up: RIT Tigers (4th title game)
- Semifinalists: Wisconsin–River Falls Falcons (5th Frozen Four); Wisconsin–Superior Yellowjackets (4th Frozen Four)
- Winning coach: Bill Beaney (2nd title)
- Attendance: 11,876

The 1996 NCAA Division III men's ice hockey tournament was the culmination of the 1995–96 season, the 13th such tournament in NCAA history. It concluded with Middlebury defeating RIT in the championship game 3–2. All Quarterfinals matchups were held at home team venues, while all succeeding games were played in River Falls, Wisconsin.

== Qualifying teams ==
The following teams qualified for the tournament. There were no automatic bids, however, conference tournament champions were given preferential consideration. No formal seeding was used while quarterfinal matches were arranged so that the road teams would have the shortest possible travel distances.

East						West					
School	Conference	Record	Berth Type	Appearance	Last Bid	School	Conference	Record	Berth Type	Appearance	Last Bid
Bowdoin	ECAC East	18–5–1	At-Large	1st	Never	Saint John's	MIAC	17–8–4	Tournament champion	1st	Never
Colby	ECAC East	19–4–0	At-Large	1st	Never	Wisconsin–River Falls	NCHA	23–4–2	Tournament champion	6th	1995
Middlebury	ECAC East	22–2–2	At-Large	2nd	1995	Wisconsin–Superior	NCHA	18–9–4	At-Large	5th	1995
Potsdam State	SUNYAC	18–8–2	Tournament champion	1st	Never						
RIT	ECAC West	22–5–1	Tournament champion	6th	1994						

== Format ==
The tournament featured three rounds of play. In the Quarterfinals, teams played a two-game series where the first team to reach 3 points was declared a winner (2 points for winning a game, 1 point each for tying). If both teams ended up with 2 points after the first two games a 20-minute mini-game used to determine a winner. Mini-game scores are in italics. Beginning with the semifinals all games became Single-game eliminations. The winning teams in the semifinals advanced to the national championship game with the losers playing in a Third Place game. The teams were seeded according to geographic proximity in the quarterfinals so the visiting team would have the shortest feasible distance to travel.

== Bracket ==
Quarterfinals; March 8–9
Middlebury	2	5	-
Colby	1	1	-
Wisconsin–Superior	6	7	-
Saint John's	5	2	-
Wisconsin–River Falls	7	7	-
Bowdoin	1	3	-
RIT	6	5	-
Potsdam State	3	3	-

Semifinals; March 15
Middlebury	4
Wisconsin–Superior	3
Wisconsin–River Falls	1
RIT	2

National championship March 16
Middlebury	3
RIT	2
Third-place game
Wisconsin–Superior	2
Wisconsin–River Falls	8

Note: * denotes overtime period(s)
Note: Mini-games in italics

== Record by conference ==
Conference	# of Bids	Record	Win %	Frozen Four	Championship Game	Champions
ECAC East	3	4–4	.500	1	1	1
NCHA	2	5–3	.625	2	-	-
ECAC West	1	3–1	.750	1	1	-
SUNYAC	1	0–2	.000	-	-	-
MIAC	1	0–2	.000	-	-	-
