= 2015 NCAA Division III men's ice hockey tournament =

- Teams: 11
- Finals site: Ridder Arena, Minneapolis, Minnesota
- Champions: Trinity Bantams (1st title)
- Runner-up: Wisconsin–Stevens Point Pointers (8th title game)
- Semifinalists: Adrian Bulldogs (2nd Frozen Four); Amherst Lord Jeffs (2nd Frozen Four)
- Winning coach: Matthew Greason (1st title)
- MOP: Nathaniel Heibron (Trinity)
- Attendance: 8,456

The 2015 NCAA Division III Men's Ice Hockey Tournament was the culmination of the 2014–15 season, the 32nd such tournament in NCAA history. It concluded with Trinity defeating Wisconsin–Stevens Point in the championship game 5-2. All First Round and Quarterfinal matchups were held at home team venues, while all succeeding games were played at the Ridder Arena in Minneapolis, Minnesota.

== Qualifying teams ==
The following teams qualified for the tournament. Automatic bids were offered to the conference tournament champion of seven different conferences. Four at-large bids were available for the highest-ranked non-automatic qualifiers (overall seed in parentheses).

East							West						
Seed	School	Conference	Record	Berth Type	Appearance	Last Bid	Seed	School	Conference	Record	Berth Type	Appearance	Last Bid
1	Amherst (2)	NESCAC	21–4–2	Tournament Champion	4th	2012	1	Adrian (1)	NCHA	23–3–3	Tournament Champion	5th	2014
2	Plattsburgh State (3)	SUNYAC	20–5–2	Tournament Champion	18th	2012	2	Wisconsin–Stevens Point	WIAC	21–6–1	At–Large	11th	2014
3	Norwich (4)	ECAC East	24–3–1	Tournament Champion	16th	2014	3	Hamline	MIAC	14–10–4	Tournament Champion	2nd	2011
4	Trinity	NESCAC	21–3–1	At–Large	4th	2008							
5	Hobart	ECAC West	21–6–0	At–Large	5th	2009							
6	Oswego State	SUNYAC	18–4–4	At–Large	14th	2014							
7	Nichols	ECAC Northeast	21–3–3	Tournament Champion	3rd	2014							
8	Plymouth State	MASCAC	16–8–3	Tournament Champion	2nd	2012							

== Format ==
The tournament featured four rounds of play. All rounds were Single-game elimination. The top two teams from each region received byes into the quarterfinal round. These teams were arranged so they were all four to reach the semifinal round the second eastern seed would play the top western seed and vice versa.

Because only three western teams received byes for the tournament, the third western seed was given the remaining bye into the quarterfinals and matched against the second western seed.

the remaining six eastern teams were placed in the first round and seeded as follows: the second eastern seed would play the eighth eastern seed, the fourth eastern seed would play the seventh eastern seed and the fifth eastern seed would play the sixth eastern seed. The winner between the fifth- and six-seeded teams, would advance to play the top overall seed. Because the fourth overall seed was required to play in the first round as the third eastern seed, the winner of its first round match would advance to play the second overall seed rather than the third overall seed. This was done to divide top four seeds evenly between the two semifinal brackets.

In the First Round and Quarterfinals the higher-seeded team served as host.

== Tournament Bracket ==
First Round; March 14
E3	Norwich (4)	3
E8	Plymouth State	2
E5	Hobart	1
E6	Oswego State	6
E4	Trinity	4
E7	Nichols	2

Quarterfinals; March 21
E1	Amherst (2)	4*
E3	Norwich (4)	3
W2	Wisconsin–Stevens Point	4
W3	Hamline	2
W1	Adrian (1)	5
E6	Oswego State	4
E2	Plattsburgh State (3)	1
E4	Trinity	5

Semifinals; March 27
E1	Amherst (2)	2
W2	Wisconsin–Stevens Point	6
W1	Adrian (1)	3
E4	Trinity	5

National Championship; March 28
W2	Wisconsin–Stevens Point	2
E4	Trinity	5

Note: * denotes overtime period(s)

== Results ==
=== First round ===
March 14, 2015; 7:00 PM	(E3) Norwich	3 – 2 (2–1, 0–0, 1–1)	(E8) Plymouth State	Kreitzberg Arena – Holderness, New Hampshire; Attendance: 1,702

Game reference

Ty Reichenbach
Goalies
Gordon Ceasar
Referees:
Chris Shepley
Chris Leavitt
Linesmen:
Mike Lizotte
Anthony Kenny

	0–1	02:03 – Michael Economos (13) (Dupell)
(Flaherty, Hale) William Pelletier (15) – 06:16	1–1
(Pelletier, Rowland) Austin Surowiec (11) – PP – 09:11	2–1
(Brandrup, Piacentini) William Pelletier (16) – 42:10	3–1
	3–2	50:50 – Ian McGilvrey (9) (Thoresen)

10 min
Penalties
36 min
34
Shots
17

March 14, 2015; 7:30 PM	(E5) Hobart	1 – 6 (0–1, 1–3, 0–2)	(E6) Oswego State	Geneva Recreation Complex – Geneva, New York; Attendance: 660

Game reference

Matt Zawadzki
Goalies
Frank Oplinger
Referees:
Joel Dupree
Craig Florkowski
Linesmen:
John McJury
Mike Foley

	0–1	01:17 – Mike Montagna (13) (Herlihey, Rivait)
	0–2	20:41 – Matt Galati (10) (Federow, Botten)
	0–3	23:58 – PP – Kenny Neil (11) (Botten, Gertsakis)
	0–4	25:35 – Bobby Gertsakis (4) (Herlihey)
(Gamache) Brad Robbins (9) – 31:02	1–4
	1–5	44:03 – Matt Galati (11) (Botten)
	1–6	58:41 – Shawn Hulshof (20) (Montagna, Herlihey)

4 min
Penalties
4 min
34
Shots
40

March 14, 2015; 7:00 PM	(E4) Trinity	4 – 2 (1–0, 2–2, 1–0)	(E7) Nichols	June Rockwell Levy Rink – Burrillville, Rhode Island; Attendance: 975

Game reference

Nathaniel Heilbron
Goalies
Alex Larson
Referees:
Matt Bielak
William McGoldrick
Linesmen:
Mike St. Lawrence
David St. Lawrence

(Gamache) Anthony Sabitsky (10) – PP – 19:10	1–0
Benjamin Hjalmarsson (2) – 28:08	2–0
(Jackson, Gularte) Greg Rooney (2) – 33:34	3–0
	3–1	37:21 – Sean Fleming (10) (Jackson, Gularte)
	3–2	39:24 – Sean Fleming (11) (Lecey, Jackson)
(Sabitsky, Whitney) Ryan Cole (15) – EN – 59:17	4–2

8 min
Penalties
10 min
57
Shots
36

=== Quarterfinals ===
March 21, 2015; 7:00 PM	(E1) Amherst	4 – 3 (OT) (1–1, 1–1, 1–1, 1–0)	(E3) Norwich	Orr Rink – Amherst, Massachusetts; Attendance: 866

Game reference

Danny Vitale
Goalies
Ty Reichenbach
Referees:
Mike Shea
Marty Hughes
Linesmen:
Mike St. Lawrence
David St. Lawrence

	0–1	06:46 – Justin Charbonneau (6) (Pelletier)
(Flanagan, Rowbotham) David White (19) – PP – 09:05	1–1
	1–2	12:04 – Corey Hale (4) (Pelletier, Rowland)
(Arena) Andrew Fenwick (9) – 35:09	2–2
	2–3	58:09 – William Pelletier (17) (Niezgoda)
(Fenwick, White) Aaron Deutsch (7) – EA – 59:47	3–3
Mike Rowbotham (9) – 68:12	4–3

8 min
Penalties
12 min
30
Shots
46

March 21, 2015; 7:00 PM	(W2) Wisconsin–Stevens Point	4 – 2 (0–1, 1–3, 0–2)	(W3) Hamline	K.B. Willett Ice Arena – Stevens Point, Wisconsin; Attendance: 1,123

Game reference

Brandon Jaeger
Goalies
John Sellie-Hanson
Referees:
Dave Marcotte
Jerry McLaughlin
Linesmen:
Brandon Schroder
Mark Engstrom

(Gamache) Joe Kalisz (17) – 04:50	1–0
(Kalisz) Kevin Gibson (8) – 30:28	2–0
	2–1	44:26 – Garrett Schmitz (2) (Rubbelke)
(Sharkey) Lawrence Cornellier (11) – 48:16	3–1
	3–2	48:16 – Kerry McGlynn (1) (Kessler)
(Henegar) Lawrence Cornellier (12) – EN – 58:40	4–2

4 min
Penalties
21 min
39
Shots
27

March 21, 2015; 7:00 PM	(W1) Adrian	5 – 4 (1–2, 2–0, 2–2)	(E6) Oswego State	Arrington Ice Arena – Adrian, Michigan; Attendance: 1,041

Game reference

Scott Shackell
Goalies
Matt Zawadzki
Referees:
Eric Smevoll
Joe Carusone
Linesmen:
Michael Verdonck
Jon Haas

(Thompson) Kyle Brothers (24) – 07:31	1–0
	1–1	10:28 – Kenny Neil (12) (Galati, Wills)
	1–2	17:29 – PP – Matt Galati (12) (Gertsakis)
Mathew Thompson (22) – SH – 38:23	2–2
(Flegel, Telfer) Ryan Lowe (7) – 39:41	3–2
(Hervey) Rob Heath (9) – 48:59	4–2
	4–3	53:50 – Nick Rivait (3) (Waterstreet)
(Lowe) Daniel Lisi (4) – 54:52	5–3
	5–4	58:21 – EA – Mike Montagna (14) (Hulshof, Neil)

8 min
Penalties
10 min
32
Shots
35

March 21, 2015; 7:00 PM	(E2) Plattsburgh State	1 – 5 (0–1, 0–0, 1–4)	(E4) Trinity	Koeppel Community Center – Hartford, Connecticut; Attendance: 2,231

Game reference

Brady Rouleau
Goalies
Nathaniel Heilbron
Referees:
Bob Collins
Will O'Malley
Linesmen:
Doug Place
Rick Urnek

	0–1	18:52 – PS – Jackson Brewer (8)
	0–2	42:45 – Elie Vered (9) (McKillop, Coveney)
	0–3	50:45 – Tim Shea (3) (Coveney, Flynn)
	0–4	52:05 – Jackson Brewer (9) (Rooney, Johnson)
	0–5	58:58 – EN – Elie Vered (10) (McKillop, Burns)
(Constantine, Beadow) Connor Toomey (13) – 59:58	1–5

2 min
Penalties
6 min
41
Shots
30

=== Semifinals ===
March 27, 2015; 7:30 PM	(E1) Amherst	2 – 6 (0–0, 1–2, 1–4)	(W2) Wisconsin–Stevens Point	Ridder Arena – Minneapolis, Minnesota; Attendance: 1,284

Game reference

Danny Vitale
Goalies
Brandon Jaeger
Referees:
Travis Ahlberg
Matt Bialek
Linesmen:
Jeremy Klobuchar
Dan Odegard

(Rowbotham, Lindstrom) Brendan Burke (6) – 23:42	1–0
(Flanagan, Brown) David White (20) – 08:15	2–0
	2–1	08:38 – Nick D'Avolio (5) (Brooks, Gibson)
	2–2	25:53 – Nick D'Avolio (6) (Kolb)
	2–3	47:23 – PP – Alex Brooks (5) (Brodie, Sharkey)
	2–4	51:14 – Lawrence Cornellier (13) (Sharkey, Ladd)
	2–5	52:49 – Joe Kalisz (18) (Gibson)
	2–6	58:15 – EN – Lawrence Cornellier (14)

6 min
Penalties
4 min
24
Shots
41

March 27, 2015; 4:00 PM	(W1) Adrian	3 – 5 (1–1, 1–4, 0–1)	(E4) Trinity	Ridder Arena – Minneapolis, Minnesota; Attendance: 1,181

Game reference

Scott Shackell
Goalies
Nathaniel Heilbron
Referees:
Eric Smevoll
Mike Shea
Linesmen:
Robby Shintani
Michael Verdonck

Ryan Lowe (10) – 15:50	1–0
	1–1	18:11 – Michael Hawkrigg (15) (Orlando, Brewer)
	1–2	24:45 – Elie Vered (11) (Flynn, Hawkrigg)
	1–3	27:23 – SH – Ethan Holdaway (7) (Orlando)
	1–4	29:45 – PP – Elie Vered (12) (Whitney, Burns)
(Davies, Balas) Chris Leone (6) – PP – 32:24	2–4
	2–5	34:55 – PP – Ryan Cole (16) (Orlando, Flynn)
(Ranalli) Mathew Thompson (23) – 41:36	3–5

24 min
Penalties
14 min
32
Shots
35

=== National Championship ===
March 28, 2015; 7:00 PM	(W2) Wisconsin–Stevens Point	2 – 5 (1–1, 0–1, 1–3)	(E4) Trinity	Ridder Arena – Minneapolis, Minnesota; Attendance: 1,303

Game reference

Brandon Jaeger
Goalies
Nathaniel Heilbron
Referees:
Eric Smevoll
Mike Shea
Linesmen:
Robby Shintani
Michael Verdonck

	0–1	03:38 – PP – Sean Orlando (15) (Hawkrigg, R. Cole)
(Sharkey, Brooks) Kyle Brodie (8) – PP – 15:16	1–1
	1–2	21:52 – Michael Hawkrigg (16) (Burns, Holdaway)
(Sharkey, Brooks) Nick D'Avolio (7) – 49:10	2–2
	2–3	56:08 – Ethan Holdaway (8) (Vered, B. Cole)
	2–4	59:23 – EN – Ryan Cole (17)
	2–5	59:46 – EN – Conor Coveney (5)

10 min
Penalties
8 min
37
Shots
24

== All-Tournament Team ==
- G: Nathaniel Heibron* (Trinity)
- D: Alex Brooks (Wisconsin–Stevens Point)
- D: Michael Flynn (Trinity)
- F: Nick D'Avolio (Wisconsin–Stevens Point)
- F: Michael Hawkrigg (Trinity)
- F: Sean Orlando (Trinity)

* Most Outstanding Player(s)

== Record by conference ==
Conference	# of Bids	Record	Win %	Frozen Four	Championship Game	Champions
NESCAC	2	5–1	.833	2	1	1
SUNYAC	2	1–2	.333	-	-	-
WIAC	1	2–1	.667	1	1	-
NCHA	1	1–1	.500	1	-	-
ECAC East	1	1–1	.500	-	-	-
ECAC West	1	0–1	.000	-	-	-
MIAC	1	0–1	.000	-	-	-
ECAC Northeast	1	0–1	.000	-	-	-
MASCAC	1	0–1	.000	-	-	-
