= 2022 NCAA Division III men's ice hockey tournament =

- Teams: 12
- Finals site: Herb Brooks Arena, Lake Placid, New York
- Champions: Adrian (1st title)
- Runner-up: Geneseo State (1st title game)
- Semifinalists: Augsburg (3rd Frozen Four); University of New England (1st Frozen Four)
- Winning coach: Adam Krug (1st title)
- MOP: Sam Ruffin (Adrian)
- Attendance: 1,980 (final)

The 2022 NCAA Division III Men's Ice Hockey Tournament was the culmination of the 2021–22 season, the 37th such tournament in NCAA history. Because of the COVID-19 pandemic, it was the first tournament held since 2019. The top ranked team in the nation, Adrian, won the program's first national championship.

== Qualifying teams ==
Twelve teams qualified for the tournament in the following ways: (Pool A) eight teams received bids as a result of being conference tournament champions from conferences that possessed an automatic bid, (Pool C) four additional teams received at-large bids based upon their records.

East							West						
Seed	School	Conference	Record	Berth Type	Appearance	Last Bid	Seed	School	Conference	Record	Berth Type	Appearance	Last Bid
1	Utica (2)	UCHC	25–2–1	Tournament Champion	3rd	2020	1	Adrian (1)	NCHA	28–1–0	Tournament Champion	10th	2020
2	Geneseo State (3)	SUNYAC	22–3–1	Tournament Champion	9th	2020	2	Augsburg (4)	MIAC	24–4–0	At–Large	7th	2019
3	Babson	NEHC	19–5–2	Tournament Champion	16th	2020	3	St. Norbert	NCHA	23–6–0	At–Large	20th	2019
4	Hobart	NEHC	19–5–2	At–Large	11th	2020	4	St. Olaf	MIAC	11–14–3	Tournament Champion	2nd	2006
5	University of New England	CCC	21–3–1	Tournament Champion	3rd	2019							
6	Elmira	NEHC	18–6–2	At–Large	16th	2012							
7	Plymouth State	MASCAC	19–5–2	Tournament Champion	5th	2020							
8	Trinity	NESCAC	17–7–1	Tournament Champion	8th	2019							

== Format ==
The tournament featured four rounds of play. All rounds were single-game elimination.

The top four rated teams received byes into the quarterfinal round and were arranged so that if they were to advance to the semifinals, the first seed would play the fourth seed and the second seed would play the third seed. Because two western teams received byes, the two eastern schools that were furthest west geographically, and did not receive byes, were placed in the same quarterfinal bracket and set to play against the eastern-most of the two western teams to receive byes. This was done so that the travel distance for the victor would be as short as possible. The remaining two western teams were placed in the same quarterfinal bracket as the other western quarterfinalist.

The remaining four eastern teams were arranged so that the highest-ranked first round team would play the lowest-ranked first round team with the winner advancing to play the lower eastern quarterfinalist. The higher-ranked of the two eastern quarterfinalists would play the winner of the final first-round game.

In the First Round and Quarterfinals the higher-seeded team served as host. Beginning with the semifinals, all games were held at the Herb Brooks Arena.

== Tournament Bracket ==
First Round; March 12
E4	Hobart	4
E6	Elmira	2
W3	St. Norbert	4*
W4	St. Olaf	3
E3	Babson	3
E8	Trinity	0
E5	University of New England	3**
E7	Plymouth State	2

Quarterfinals; March 19
W1	Adrian (1)	7
E4	Hobart	4
W2	Augsburg (4)	4
W3	St. Norbert	1
E2	Geneseo State (3)	3
E3	Babson	2
E1	Utica (2)	0
E5	University of New England	2

Semifinals; March 25
W1	Adrian (1)	5
W2	Augsburg (4)	1
E2	Geneseo State (3)	8
E5	University of New England	3

National Championship; March 26
W1	Adrian (1)	5
E2	Geneseo State (3)	2

Note: * denotes overtime period(s)

== Results ==
=== First round ===
March 12, 2022; 7:00 PM	(E4) Hobart	4 – 2 (2–0, 2–2, 0–0)	(E6) Elmira	Geneva Recreation Complex – Geneva, New York; Attendance: 850

Liam Lascelle
Goalies
Chris Janzen
Referees:
Derek Sylvester
Jim Visconte
Linesmen:
Anthony Perez
Sam Cucinotta

(Howell, Benemerito) Blake Coffey (7) – 07:50	1–0
(Coffey, Buzoverya) Zach Tyson (10) – 13:20	2–0
(Mourar, Shell) Luke Aquaro (16) – 20:22	3–0
	3–1	27:00 – SH – Christian Abrams (3)
(Iasenza, Lascelle) Artem Buzoverya (8) – 28:49	4–1
	4–2	29:05 – Shawn Kennedy (8) (Domitrovic, Mastrangeli)

4 min
Penalties
6 min
41
Shots
27

March 12, 2022; 7:05 PM	(W3) St. Norbert	4 – 3 (OT) (1–2, 0–1, 2–0, 1–0)	(W4) St. Olaf	Cornerstone Community Center – Ashwaubenon, Wisconsin; Attendance: 1,086

Colby Entz
Goalies
Lukas Haugen
Referees:
Jason Swenson
Dustin Martin
Linesmen:
Joe Guzzardi
John Annis

	0–1	01:55 – Tyler Cooper (14) (Casey)
	0–2	11:54 – Parker Casey (6) (Brown, Cooper)
(Famulak) Evan Cholak (4) – 14:18	1–2
	1–3	36:25 – Jonathan Young (8) (Pointer, Darby)
(Bates, Frantti) Liam Fraser (24) – 44:14	2–3
(Aird, Baker) Brendan Mark (6) – PP – 52:47	3–3
(Bates, Mickelson) Michael Spethmann (5) – 60:56	4–3

2 min
Penalties
6 min
51
Shots
26

March 12, 2022; 7:00 PM	(E4) Babson	3 – 0 (0–0, 1–0, 2–0)	(E6) Trinity	Babson Skating Center – Wellesley, Massachusetts; Attendance: 1,400

Brad Arvanitis
Goalies
J.P. Mella

Ryan Campbell (1) – 21:55	1–0
(Egan, Kramer) Ryan Black (19) – 46:38	2–0
(Campbell) John Corrigan (3) – EN – 58:54	3–0

4 min
Penalties
0 min
24
Shots
27

March 12, 2022; 7:00 PM	(E5) University of New England	3 – 2 (2OT) (0–2, 1–0, 1–0, 1–0)	(E7) Plymouth State	Biddeford Ice Arena – Biddeford, Maine; Attendance: 932

Billy Girard
Goalies
Kalle Andersson
Referees:
Jared Waitt
Matthew Hallock
Linesmen:
Ryan Whittemore
Patrick Philbin

	0–1	06:36 – Mike McPherson (6) (Besner, Barone)
	0–2	08:15 – Jacob Laurin (7) (Stuckless, Austin)
(Jones, Winslow) Aaron Aragon (7) – 23:24	1–2
(Elser, DiScanio) Collins Heinold (3) – 47:30	2–2
(Christy, Heinold) Austin Morgan (11) – 84:10	3–2

19 min
Penalties
6 min
47
Shots
36

=== Quarterfinals ===
March 19, 2022; 7:00 PM	(W1) Adrian	7 – 4 (1–1, 4–1, 2–2)	(E4) Hobart	Arrington Ice Arena – Adrian, Michigan; Attendance: 1,247

Cameron Gray
Goalies
Liam Lascelle
Joe Halstrom
Referees:
Tyler Loftus
David Vargas
Linesmen:
John Annis
Troy Merret

(Heintz, Spodniak) Zach Goberis (13) – 08:43	1–0
	1–1	15:09 – PP – Matthew Iasenza (6) (Martineau, Mourar)
(Kaljian, Enns) Alessio Luciani (16) – 21:15	2–1
(Enns, Wendt) Sam Ruffin (16) – 26:09	3–1
(Goberis, Heintz) Matus Spodniak (16) – 30:51	4–1
	4–2	37:39 – Brenden Howell (4) (Stuckless, Austin)
(Goberis, Heintz) Matus Spodniak (17) – 38:26	5–2
	5–3	42:50 – Aaron Maguyon (15) (Lindsay)
(Kaljian, Luciani) Rex Moe (17) – 57:20	6–3
	6–4	58:50 – EA – Jake Gresh (6)
(Goberis, Ruffin) Hunter Wendt (9) – EN – 59:37	7–4

12 min
Penalties
6 min
26
Shots
28

March 19, 2022; 7:00 PM	(W1) Augsburg	4 – 1 (0–1, 1–0, 3–0)	(E4) St. Norbert	Augsburg Ice Arena – Minneapolis, Minnesota; Attendance: 800

Samuel Vyletelka
Goalies
Colby Entz
Referees:
Tyler Loftus
David Vargas
Linesmen:
John Annis
Troy Merret

	0–1	19:47 – Tim Nicksic (6) (Stacho)
(Martinsen, Holland) Jarod Blackowiak (13) – 24:34	1–1
(Holland, O'Connor) Austin Dollimer (9) – PP – 54:01	2–1
(Palmer, Yeo) Erik Palmqvist (7) – 57:53	3–1
(Dollimer) Austin Martinsen (16) – EN – 58:57	4–1

6 min
Penalties
2 min
26
Shots
23

March 19, 2022; 7:00 PM	(E2) Geneseo State	3 – 2 (0–0, 1–0, 2–2)	(E3) Babson	Ira S. Wilson Ice Arena – Geneseo, New York; Attendance: 1,274

Matt Petizian
Goalies
Brad Arvanitis
Referees:
Matt Bielak
Craig Florkowski
Linesmen:
Sean Corcoran
Dan Barreca

(Perna, Cervone) Justin Cmunt (18) – 26:42	1–0
(Morgan, Perna) Tyson Gilmour (10) – PP – 40:28	2–0
(Miller, Cmunt) Nathan Poolman (2) – 43:48	3–0
	3–1	48:34 – Mike Egan (15) (Kramer, Black)
	3–2	55:37 – PP – Wyatt George (6) (Boutoussov, Schmitt)

6 min
Penalties
8 min
35
Shots
17

March 19, 2022; 2:00 PM	(E1) Utica	0 – 2 (0–0, 0–1, 0–1)	(E5) University of New England	Adirondack Bank Center – Utica, New York; Attendance: 3,474

Sean Dickson	Goalies	Billy Girard
0–1 / 32:41 – SH – Daniel Winslow (13) (Darcy); 0–2 / 59:35 – EN – Tyler Seltenreich (12) (Aragon, Darcy)
2 min	Penalties	6 min
38	Shots	17

=== Semifinals ===
March 25, 2022; 3:00 PM	(W1) Adrian	5 – 1 (2–0, 0–0, 3–1)	(W2) Augsburg	Herb Brooks Arena – Lake Placid, New York; Attendance: 1,024

Cameron Gray
Goalies
Samuel Vyletelka
Referees:
Derek Sylvester
Jared Waitt
Linesmen:
Sean Corcoran
Dan Barecca

(Eller, Enns) Sam Ruffin (17) – 17:07	1–0
(Pitoscia, Eller) Trevor Coykendall (12) – 18:33	2–0
	2–1	46:20 – Austin Dollimer (10) (Belisle)
(Heintz, Adeniye) Zach Goberis (14) – 48:26	3–1
Hunter Wendt (10) – SH – EN – 58:01	4–1
(Couto) Zach Goberis (17) – SH – EN – 58:59	5–1

8 min
Penalties
8 min
35
Shots
21

March 25, 2022; 6:30 PM	(E2) Geneseo State	8 – 3 (4–1, 1–1, 3–1)	(E5) University of New England	Herb Brooks Arena – Lake Placid, New York; Attendance: 1,146

Matt Petizian
Goalies
Billy Girard
Referees:
Jason Swenson
Jeremy Hendrickson
Linesmen:
Anthony Perez
Sam Cuccinotta

	0–1	10:49 – Daniel Winslow (14) (Dixson, Darcy)
(Rehbaum, Cleghorn) Dan Bosio (23) – 05:08	1–1
(Doran, Perna) Dan Bosio (24) – PP – 12:14	2–1
(Gilmour, Doran) Chris Perna (7) – PP – 13:01	3–1
(Wilkins, Miller) Peter Morgan (18) – 18:21	4–1
(Garozzo, Cleghorn) Peter Morgan (19) – 21:20	5–1
	5–2	28:30 – PP – Jared Christy (17) (Morgan, Fuss)
(Miller) Tyson Gilmour (11) – 40:10	6–2
	6–3	53:14 – Anthony Sciucco (2) (Fuss, Zanca)
(Bosio) Matthew Doran (3) – PP – 53:57	7–3
(Garozzo, Koutsomitis) Alex Wilkins (2) – 55:35	8–3

12 min
Penalties
14 min
26
Shots
24

=== National Championship ===
March 26, 2022; 7:00 PM	(W1) Adrian	5 – 2 (3–1, 0–1, 2–0)	(W2) Geneseo State	Herb Brooks Arena – Lake Placid, New York; Attendance: 2,446

Cameron Gray
Goalies
Matt Petizian
Referees:
Derek Sylvester
Jason Swenson
Linesmen:
Anthony Perez
Sam Cuccinotta

(Shields, Luciani) Sam Ruffin (18) – PP – 07:56	1–0
	1–1	08:16 – SH – Matthew Doran (4) (Bosio, Cleghorn)
(Ruffin) Alessio Luciani (17) – PP – 09:34	2–1
(Rehding) Trevor Coykendall (13) – 12:39	3–1
	3–2	24:18 – Levi Wunder (2) (Wilkins)
(Coykendall) Ryan Pitoscia (15) – 49:05	4–2
Sam Ruffin (19) – EN – 58:49	5–2

12 min
Penalties
17 min
23
Shots
30

== All-Tournament Team ==
- G: Cameron Gray (Adrian)
- D: Matthew Doran (Geneseo State)
- D: Matt Eller (Adrian)
- F: Dan Bosio (Geneseo State)
- F: Trevor Coykendall (Adrian)
- F: Sam Ruffin* (Adrian)

* Most Outstanding Player(s)

== Record by conference ==
Conference	# of Bids	Record	Win %	Frozen Four	Championship Game	Champions
NCHA	2	4–1	.800	1	1	1
MIAC	2	1–2	.333	1	-	-
NEHC	2	2–2	.500	-	-	-
UCHC	2	0–2	.000	-	-	-
SUNYAC	1	2–1	.667	1	1	-
CCC	1	2–1	.667	1	-	-
NESCAC	1	0–1	.000	-	-	-
MASCAC	1	0–1	.000	-	-	-
