= 1984 NCAA Division III men's ice hockey tournament =

College ice hockey tournament in the United States

- Teams: 8
- Finals site: Frank Ritter Memorial Ice Arena, Rochester, New York
- Champions: Babson Beavers (1st title)
- Runner-up: Union Dutchmen (1st title game)
- Semifinalists: Augsburg Auggies (1st Frozen Four); RIT Tigers (1st Frozen Four)
- Winning coach: Rob Riley (1st title)
- MOP: Paul Donato (Babson)
- Attendance: 9,226

The 1984 NCAA Division III Men's Ice Hockey Tournament was the culmination of the 1983–84 season, the 1st such tournament in NCAA history. It concluded with Babson defeating Union 8-0. All Quarterfinals matchups were held at home team venues, while all succeeding games were played in Rochester, New York.

== Qualifying teams ==
Because neither of the two western conferences held a conference tournament the NCAA had all western schools play collectively in the Western Intercollegiate Hockey Association. At the conclusion of the regular season the top 8 teams, regardless of their conference, were invited to play in the WIHA Tournament. Though the tournament was arranged by the NCAA it is not considered as part of the NCAA tournament and is displayed here for reference. This tournament had been used to determine the Division II tournament invitees but, with the majority of bids being submitted to the Division III tournament, the regional tournament was now used for this championship.

=== WIHA Tournament ===
Regional Quarterfinals
Augsburg	7	5
Lake Forest	4	1
Wisconsin–River Falls	6	11
St. Olaf	4	3
Hamline	5	5
Gustavus Adolphus	3	4
St. Thomas	5	5
Bethel	5	4

Regional semifinals
Augsburg	3
Wisconsin–River Falls	10
Hamline	2
St. Thomas	7

Regional Final
Wisconsin–River Falls	4
St. Thomas	5
Third place
Augsburg	10
Hamline	3

=== NCAA Qualifiers ===
The following teams qualified for the tournament. There were no automatic bids, however, conference tournament champions were given preferential consideration. No formal seeding was used while quarterfinal matches were arranged so that the road teams would have the shortest possible travel distances.

East				West			
School	Conference	Record	Berth Type	School	Conference	Record	Berth Type
Babson	ECAC 2	24–5–0	Tournament Champion	Augsburg	MIAC	20–11–0	WIHA Third Place
New England College	ECAC 2	16–7–2	At-Large	St. Thomas	MIAC	19–9–1	WIHA Champion
Oswego State	ECAC 2	21–9–0	At-Large	Wisconsin-River Falls	NCHA	20–9–1	WIHA runner-up
RIT	ECAC 2	26–5–0	Tournament Champion				
Union	ECAC 2	17–9–1	At-Large				

== Format ==
The tournament featured three rounds of play. In the Quarterfinals, teams played two-game aggregate series to determine which school advanced to the semifinals. Beginning with the semifinals all games became Single-game eliminations. The winning teams in the semifinals advanced to the National Championship Game with the losers playing in a Third Place game. The teams were seeded according to geographic proximity in the quarterfinals so the visiting team would have the shortest feasible distance to travel.

== Tournament bracket ==
Quarterfinals; March 10–11
Augsburg	8	5*	13
St. Thomas	7	5	12
Babson	4	2**	6
New England College	3	2	5
RIT	13	10	23
Oswego State	2	1	3
Union	4	4	8
Wisconsin-River Falls	0	6	6

Semifinals; March 17
Augsburg	2
Babson	7
RIT	4
Union	5****

National championship March 18
Babson	8
Union	0
Third-place game
Augsburg	1
RIT	10

Note: * denotes overtime period(s)

== All-Tournament team ==
- G: Keith Houghton (Babson)
- D: Joe Thibert (Babson)
- D: John MacKenzie (Union)
- F: Richie Herbert (RIT)
- F: Gill Egan (Union)
- F: Russ McKinnon (Babson)
- F: Paul Donato* (Babson)

* Most Outstanding Player(s)

== Record by conference ==
Conference	# of Bids	Record	Win %	Frozen Four	Championship Game	Champions
ECAC 2	5	8–6–2	.563	3	2	1
MIAC	2	1–3–2	.333	1	-	-
NCHA	1	1–1	.500	-	-	-
