= 1997 NCAA Division III men's ice hockey tournament =

- Teams: 8
- Finals site: Duke Nelson Arena; Middlebury, Vermont
- Champions: Middlebury Panthers (3rd title)
- Runner-up: Wisconsin–Superior Yellowjackets (2nd title game)
- Semifinalists: Saint John's Johnnies (1st Frozen Four); Norwich Cadets (1st Frozen Four)
- Winning coach: Bill Beaney (3rd title)
- Attendance: 16,850

The 1997 NCAA Division III Men's Ice Hockey Tournament was the culmination of the 1996–97 season, the 14th such tournament in NCAA history. It concluded with Middlebury defeating Wisconsin-Superior in the championship game 3-2. All Quarterfinals matchups were held at home team venues, while all succeeding games were played in Middlebury, Vermont.

The championship marked the third in a row for Middlebury.

== Qualifying teams ==
The following teams qualified for the tournament. There were no automatic bids, however, conference tournament champions were given preferential consideration. No formal seeding was used while quarterfinal matches were arranged so that the road teams would have the shortest possible travel distances.

East						West					
School	Conference	Record	Berth Type	Appearance	Last Bid	School	Conference	Record	Berth Type	Appearance	Last Bid
Elmira	ECAC West	15–8–4	At-Large	8th	1994	Saint John's	MIAC	24–5–0	Tournament Champion	2nd	1996
Middlebury	ECAC East	18–3–2	At-Large	3rd	1996	St. Norbert	NCHA	20–8–1	At-Large	1st	Never
Norwich	ECAC East	20–4–2	At-Large	2nd	1987	Wisconsin–Superior	NCHA	21–7–2	Tournament Champion	6th	1996
Plattsburgh State	SUNYAC	22–5–2	Tournament Champion	6th	1995						
RIT	ECAC West	21–5–2	Tournament Champion	7th	1996						

== Format ==
The tournament featured three rounds of play. In the Quarterfinals, teams played a two-game series where the first team to reach 3 points was declared a winner (2 points for winning a game, 1 point each for tying). If both teams ended up with 2 points after the first two games a 20-minute mini-game used to determine a winner. Mini-game scores are in italics. Beginning with the Semifinals all games became Single-game eliminations. The winning teams in the semifinals advanced to the National Championship Game with the losers playing in a Third Place game. The teams were seeded according to geographic proximity in the quarterfinals so the visiting team would have the shortest feasible distance to travel.

== Bracket ==
Quarterfinals; March 14–15
Norwich	3	5	-
Plattsburgh State	3	2	-
St. Norbert	2	1	0
Wisconsin–Superior	0	4	1
Saint John's	2	4	-
Elmira	2	2	-
Middlebury	6	6	-
RIT	4	3	-

Semifinals; March 21
Norwich	1
Wisconsin–Superior	2**
Saint John's	1
Middlebury	4

National Championship; March 22
Wisconsin–Superior	2
Middlebury	3
Third Place Game
Norwich	3
Saint John's	4

Note: * denotes overtime period(s)
Note: Mini-games in italics

== Record by conference ==
Conference	# of Bids	Record	Win %	Frozen Four	Championship Game	Champions
ECAC East	2	5–2–1	.688	2	1	1
NCHA	2	3–3–0	.500	1	1	-
ECAC West	2	0–3–1	.125	-	-	-
MIAC	1	2–1–1	.625	1	-	-
SUNYAC	1	0–1–1	.250	-	-	-
