= 1986 NCAA Division III men's ice hockey tournament =

- Teams: 8
- Finals site: John S. Glas Field House, Bemidji, Minnesota
- Champions: Bemidji State Beavers (1st title)
- Runner-up: Plattsburgh State Cardinals (vacated title game)
- Semifinalists: RIT Tigers (3rd Frozen Four); Mankato State Mavericks (1st Frozen Four)
- Winning coach: Bob Peters (1st title)
- MOP: Mike Alexander (Bemidji State)
- Attendance: 14,592

The 1986 NCAA Division III Men's Ice Hockey Tournament was the culmination of the 1985–86 season, the 3rd such tournament in NCAA history. It concluded with Bemidji State defeating Plattsburgh State 8-5. All Quarterfinals matchups were held at home team venues, while all succeeding games were played in Bemidji, Minnesota.

Plattsburgh State's tournament performance was later vacated due to NCAA violations.

== Qualifying teams ==
The following teams qualified for the tournament. There were no automatic bids, however, conference tournament champions were given preferential consideration. No formal seeding was used while quarterfinal matches were arranged so that the road teams would have the shortest possible travel distances.

East						West					
School	Conference	Record	Berth Type	Appearance	Last Bid	School	Conference	Record	Berth Type	Appearance	Last Bid
Babson	ECAC East	19–7–1	At-Large	3rd	1985	Bemidji State	NCHA	22–8–1	Tournament Champion	2nd	1985
Elmira	ECAC West	24–5–0	At-Large	1st	Never	Mankato State	NCHA	25–6–3	At-Large	2nd	1985
Plattsburgh State	ECAC West	25–11–1	At-Large	(vacated)	1985	St. Thomas	MIAC	24–5–1	Tournament Champion	3rd	1985
RIT	ECAC West	28–5–0	Tournament Champion	3rd	1985						
Union	ECAC West	15–12–0	At-Large	3rd	1985						

== Format ==
The tournament featured three rounds of play. In the Quarterfinals, teams played a two-game series to determine which school advanced to the Semifinals, with tied series decided by a 20-minute mini-game. Mini-game scores are in italics. Beginning with the Semifinals all games became Single-game eliminations. The winning teams in the semifinals advanced to the National Championship Game with the losers playing in a Third Place game. The teams were seeded according to geographic proximity in the quarterfinals so the visiting team would have the shortest feasible distance to travel.

== Bracket ==
Quarterfinals; March 14–16
Mankato State	6	1	2
St. Thomas	5	6	0
Plattsburgh State	7	5	3
Babson	5	8	1
Bemidji State	4	3	3
Elmira	2	5	0
RIT	4	8	-
Union	1	7	-

Semifinals; March 21
Mankato State	5
Plattsburgh State	7
Bemidji State	4***
RIT	3

National Championship; March 22
Plattsburgh State	5
Bemidji State	8
Third Place Game
Mankato State	0
RIT	6

Note: * denotes overtime period(s)
Note: Mini-games in italics

== All-Tournament Team ==
- G: Jim Martin (Bemidji State)
- D: Chris Panek (Plattsburgh State)
- D: Dale Rivington (RIT)
- F: Mike Alexander* (Bemidji State)
- F: Tim Lescarbeau (Bemidji State)
- F: Todd Lescarbeau (Bemidji State)

* Most Outstanding Player(s)

== Record by conference ==
Conference	# of Bids	Record	Win %	Frozen Four	Championship Game	Champions
ECAC West	3	4–4	.500	1	-	-
NCHA	2	4–4	.500	2	1	1
ECAC East	1	1–1	.500	-	-	-
MIAC	1	1–1	.500	-	-	-

Plattsburgh State's record not included
