= 2017 NCAA Division III men's ice hockey tournament =

- Teams: 12
- Finals site: Utica Memorial Auditorium, Utica, New York
- Champions: Norwich Cadets (4th title)
- Runner-up: Trinity Bantams (2nd title game)
- Semifinalists: Adrian Bulldogs (3rd Frozen Four); St. Norbert Green Knights (11th Frozen Four)
- Winning coach: Mike McShane (4th title)
- MOP: William Pelletier (Norwich)
- Attendance: 12,000

The 2017 NCAA Division III Men's Ice Hockey Tournament was the culmination of the 2016–17 season, the 34th such tournament in NCAA history. It concluded with Norwich defeating Trinity in the championship game 4-1. All First Round and Quarterfinal matchups were held at home team venues, while all succeeding games were played at the Utica Memorial Auditorium in Utica, New York.

== Qualifying teams ==
The following teams qualified for the tournament. Automatic bids were offered to the conference tournament champion of eight different conferences. Four at-large bids were available for the highest-ranked non-automatic qualifiers (overall seed in parentheses).

East							West						
Seed	School	Conference	Record	Berth Type	Appearance	Last Bid	Seed	School	Conference	Record	Berth Type	Appearance	Last Bid
1	Norwich (1)	NEHC	23–1–3	Tournament Champion	17th	2015	1	St. Norbert	NCHA	21–5–1	Tournament Champion	17th	2016
2	Hobart	ECAC West	20–4–4	Tournament Champion	7th	2016	2	Adrian	NCHA	19–6–2	At–Large	7th	2016
3	Trinity	NESCAC	18–6–3	Tournament Champion	6th	2016	3	Wisconsin–Stevens Point	WIAC	21–4–3	At–Large	13th	2016
4	Oswego State	SUNYAC	21–5–1	At–Large	15th	2015	4	Augsburg	MIAC	17–4–6	Tournament Champion	4th	2016
5	Hamilton	NESCAC	19–4–4	At–Large	1st	Never							
6	Plattsburgh State	SUNYAC	17–9–1	Tournament Champion	19th	2015							
7	Endicott	CCC	23–3–2	Tournament Champion	1st	Never							
8	Salem State	MASCAC	15–9–3	Tournament Champion	9th	2016							

== Format ==
The tournament featured four rounds of play. All rounds were Single-game elimination.

Because at least four western teams qualified, the tournament was arranged so that there were two eastern and two western quarterfinal brackets. The top two teams from each region were placed in separate quarterfinal brackets and then arranged so that were all to reach the semifinals the top western seed would play the second eastern seed and vice versa.

Since four western teams and eight eastern teams qualified for the tournament all western teams received byes into the quarterfinal round while all eastern teams began in the First Round. The eastern teams were arranged so that the first seed would play the eighth seed, the second seed would play the seventh seed, the third seed would play the sixth seed and the fourth seed would play the fifth seed.

The winner between the fourth- and fifth-seeded eastern teams would play the victor of the first- and eighth-seeded match while the winner between the third- and sixth-seeded eastern teams would play the victor of the second- and seventh-seeded match.

The western teams were arranged so that the first seeded team would play the fourth seeded team while the second seeded team would play the third seeded team.

In the First Round and Quarterfinals the higher-seeded team served as host.

== Tournament Bracket ==
First Round; March 11
E1	Norwich (1)	3
E8	Salem State	1
E4	Oswego State	1
E5	Hamilton	3
E2	Hobart	3
E7	Endicott	4
E3	Trinity	4
E6	Plattsburgh State	1

Quarterfinals; March 18
W2	Adrian	6
W3	Wisconsin–Stevens Point	3
E1	Norwich (1)	6
E5	Hamilton	2
W1	St. Norbert	4*
W4	Augsburg	3
E7	Endicott	1
E3	Trinity	2**

Semifinals; March 24
W2	Adrian	4
E1	Norwich (1)	5*
W1	St. Norbert	2
E3	Trinity	3

National Championship; March 25
E1	Norwich (1)	4
E3	Trinity	1

Note: * denotes overtime period(s)

== Results ==
=== First round ===
March 11, 2017; 7:00 PM	(E1) Norwich	3 – 1 (1–0, 0–0, 2–1)	(E8) Salem State	Kreitzberg Arena – Northfield, Vermont; Attendance: 1,706

Game reference

Braeden Ostepchuk
Goalies
Jason Pucciarelli

(Smith, Pelletier) Tyler Piacentini (15) – PP – 04:12	1–0
(Lewis, Surowiec) Christian Thompson (3) – 48:36	2–0
(Flaherty, Pichette) Payton Baldillez (4) – 54:04	3–0
	3–1	58:47 – Casey Miller (7) (Cook)

4 min
Penalties
10 min
29
Shots
23

March 11, 2017; 7:00 PM	(E4) Oswego State	1 – 3 (0–1, 0–1, 1–1)	(E5) Hamilton	Campus Center Ice Arena – Oswego, New York; Attendance: 1,836

Game reference

David Jacobson
Goalies
Evan Buitenhuis
Referees:
Joe Carrusone
Curt Peterson
Linesmen:
Jordan Patarino
Rick Lembo

	0–1	09:30 – Robbie Murden (6)
	0–2	32:54 – PP – Robbie Murden (7) (Morrison, Lamberti)
(Hulshof, Neil) Chris MacMillan (2) – 53:13	1–2
	1–3	58:55 – EN – Jonathan Stickel (3) (Conway, Morrison)

6 min
Penalties
0 min
35
Shots
29

March 11, 2017; 7:00 PM	(E2) Hobart	3 – 4 (0–1, 3–2, 0–1)	(E7) Endicott	Geneva Recreation Complex – Geneva, New York; Attendance: 355

Game reference

Frank Oplinger
Goalies
Kevin Aldridge
Referees:
Derek Sylvester
Kasey Terreri
Linesmen:
Matt Terreri
Fraser McIntyre]

	0–1	14:35 – Frankie Spellman (1) (Musil, Horwitz)
	0–2	24:04 – Tommy Besinger (18) (Bleck)
	0–3	32:08 – Jason Kalinowski (13) (Heidkamp)
(Sokol) Nick Bingaman (19) – 24:04	1–3
(Ťoupal, MacDougall) Bo Webster (5) – 37:28	2–3
(Shaw) Tyler Wolf (2) – 38:27	3–3
	3–4	50:50 – Jason Kalinowski (14) (Day, Bleck)

2 min
Penalties
10 min
43
Shots
32

March 11, 2017; 7:00 PM	(E3) Trinity	4 – 1 (2–0, 1–1, 1–0)	(E6) Plattsburgh State	Koeppel Community Center – Hartford, Connecticut; Attendance: 450

Game reference
Alex Morin	Goalies	Brady Rouleau	Referees: Joel Dupree; Mike Pleau; Linesmen: Mike St. Lawrence; David St. Lawrence
(R. Cole, Whitney) Sean Orlando (16) – PP – 01:16 (Whitney, Johnson) Sean Orlando (17) – 12:46 (Holdaway, Martin) Brandon Cole (7) – 27:14; Brandon Cole (8) – EN – 59:51 / Goals / 23:31 – Joe Drabin (12) (Owens)			Referees: Joel Dupree; Mike Pleau; Linesmen: Mike St. Lawrence; David St. Lawrence
8 min	Penalties	6 min	Referees: Joel Dupree; Mike Pleau; Linesmen: Mike St. Lawrence; David St. Lawrence
39	Shots	27	Referees: Joel Dupree; Mike Pleau; Linesmen: Mike St. Lawrence; David St. Lawrence

=== Quarterfinals ===
March 18, 2017; 7:00 PM	(W2) Adrian	6 – 3 (2–1, 1–2, 3–0)	(W3) Wisconsin–Stevens Point	K.B. Willett Ice Arena – Stevens Point, Wisconsin; Attendance: 1,281

Game reference

Kevin Entmaa
Goalies
Max Milosek
P.J. Bridges
Referees:
Joshua Hatinger
Dave Marcotte
Linesmen:
Joe Oberg
Taylor Vichorek

(Armour, Colatarci) Trevor Boyd (17) – PP – 06:44	1–0
	1–1	07:39 – Logan Fredericks (8) (Karty, Nong-Lambert)
(Brothers, McCloy) Mathew Thompson (5) – PP – 19:41	2–1
(Armour, Boyd) Dino Balsamo (2) – PP – 26:28	3–1
	3–2	34:58 – PP – Tanner Karty (10) (Nong-Lambert, Davis)
	3–3	39:40 – Kyle Sharkey (9) (Cornellier, Barber)
Trevor Boyd (18) – 46:18	4–3
(Brothers, Armour) Cory Dunn (9) – PP – 49:50	5–3
(Dunn) Austin Hervey (8) – EN – 58:13	6–3

16 min
Penalties
21 min
27
Shots
42

March 18, 2017; 7:00 PM	(E1) Norwich	6 – 2 (1–0, 3–1, 2–1)	(E5) Hamilton	Kreitzberg Arena – Northfield, Vermont; Attendance: 2,142

Game reference

Ty Reichenbach
Goalies
Evan Buitenhuis
Referees:
Mike Jones
Mike Pleau
Linesmen:
David St. Lawrence
Michael St. Lawrence

(Dockery, Surowiec) Christian Thompson (4) – PP – 09:03	1–0
Brian Rowland (5) – 32:16	2–0
	2–1	34:49 – PP – Conor Lamberti (4) (Murden, Conway)
Kevin Salvucci (20) – 39:03	3–1
(Pelletier) Ian Williams (8) – 39:16	4–1
(Williams, Pelletier) Kevin Salvucci (21) – 54:34	5–1
	5–2	56:51 – Jon Carkeek (5) (Daigler)
Anthony Flaherty (11) – EN – 59:00	6–2

8 min
Penalties
6 min
36
Shots
25

March 18, 2017; 7:05 PM	(W1) St. Norbert	4 – 3 (OT) (0–1, 2–1, 1–1, 1–0)	(W4) Augsburg	Cornerstone Community Center – Ashwaubenon, Wisconsin; Attendance: 1,660

Game reference

T.J. Black
Goalies
Nick Schmit
Referees:
Eric Smevoll
Tony Lancette
Linesmen:
Shane Dillon
Mason Strom

	0–1	08:03 – Corbin Chapman (12) (Flynn, Dietsch)
(Pavek, K. Black) Luke Karakas (2) – 26:26	1–1
	1–2	31:14 – Trevor Stewart (10) (Chapman)
(Sacco, Andrews) Pijus Rulevičius (6) – 39:57	2–2
(Christensen) Steven Phillips (9) – 51:55	3–2
	3–3	54:33 – Corbin Chapman (13) (Dietsch)
(Rulevičius, Pung) Roman Uchyn (11) – 73:54	4–3

6 min
Penalties
12 min
26
Shots
34

March 18, 2017; 7:00 PM	(E3) Trinity	2 – 1 (2OT) (0–0, 1–1, 0–0, 0–0, 1–0)	(E7) Endicott	Koeppel Community Center – Hartford, Connecticut; Attendance: 501

Game reference

Alex Morin
Goalies
Kevin Aldridge
Referees:
Doug Place
Jared Waitt
Linesmen:
Rick Urnek
Dan Gosselin

	0–1	23:12 – Josh Bowes (12) (Horwitz, Musil)
(Sabitsky, Feeney) Sean Orlando (18) – 35:28	1–1
(R. Cole) Anthony Sabitsky (17) – 84:15	2–1

8 min
Penalties
10 min
69
Shots
50

=== Semifinals ===
March 24, 2017; 6:30 PM	(E1) Norwich	5 – 4 (OT) (1–1, 2–1, 1–2, 1–0)	(W2) Adrian	Utica Memorial Auditorium – Utica, New York; Attendance: 1,525

Braeden Ostepchuk
Goalies
Kevin Entmaa
Referees:
Doug Place
Joshua Hatinger
Linesmen:
Brian Oliver
Erik Geller

(Williams, Rowland) William Pelletier (17) – 14:53	1–0
	1–1	18:03 – Bryan Yim (14) (Rust, Hoy)
(Piacentini) Jake Erickson (2) – 34:34	2–1
	2–2	35:55 – PP – Mathew Thompson (6) (McCloy, Brothers)
(Williams, Salvucci) Jake Erickson (3) – 38:21	3–2
Kevin Salvucci (21) – 40:53	4–2
	4–3	54:23 – PP – Trevor Boyd (19) (Colatarci, Armour)
	4–4	55:47 – Joey Colatarci (3) (Yim)
(Evangelista, Pelletier) Ian Williams (9) – 71:40	5–4

6 min
Penalties
8 min
29
Shots
36

March 24, 2017; 3:00 PM	(W1) St. Norbert	2 – 3 (1–1, 1–2, 0–0)	(E3) Trinity	Utica Memorial Auditorium – Utica, New York; Attendance: 1,525

Game reference

T.J. Black
Goalies
Alex Morin
Referees:
Mike Pleau
Shawn Houser
Linesmen:
Mike St. Lawrence
David St. Lawrence

(Karakas, Pavek) Jeremy Olinyk (7) – 13:00	1–0
	1–1	14:25 – PP – Anthony Sabitsky (18) (R. Cole, Whitney)
	1–2	31:28 – Ethan Holdaway (9) (Whitney, Orlando)
(Sacco, Thompson) Pijus Rulevičius (7) – PP – 29:12	2–2
	2–3	38:26 – Sam Johnson (1) (Whitney, Zuccarini)

6 min
Penalties
2 min
33
Shots
37

=== National Championship ===
March 25, 2017; 7:00 PM	(E1) Norwich	4 – 1 (0–0, 2–1, 2–0)	(E3) Trinity	Utica Memorial Auditorium – Utica, New York; Attendance: 1,595

Game reference

Ty Reichenbach
Goalies
Alex Morin
Referees:
Mike Pleau
Doug Place
Linesmen:
Brian Oliver
Erik Geller

(Pichette) Anthony Flaherty (12) – 21:38	1–0
	1–1	25:04 – PP – Tyler Whitney (13) (Feeney, R. Cole)
(Dockery) Todd Jackson (7) – 28:07	2–1
Paul Russell (8) – 46:19	3–1
(Salvucci) William Pelletier (18) – EN – 59:35	4–1

8 min
Penalties
10 min
35
Shots
36

== All-Tournament Team ==
- G: Ty Reichenbach (Norwich)
- D: Jake Erickson (Norwich)
- D: Joey Colatarci (Adrian)
- F: Ryan Cole (Trinity)
- F: William Pelletier* (Norwich)
- F: Tyler Whitney (Trinity)

* Most Outstanding Player(s)

== Record by conference ==
Conference	# of Bids	Record	Win %	Frozen Four	Championship Game	Champions
NESCAC	2	4–2	.667	1	1	-
NCHA	2	2–2	.500	2	-	-
SUNYAC	2	0–2	.000	-	-	-
NEHC	1	4–0	1.000	1	1	1
CCC	1	1–1	.500	-	-	-
WIAC	1	0–1	.000	-	-	-
ECAC West	1	0–1	.000	-	-	-
MIAC	1	0–1	.000	-	-	-
MASCAC	1	0–1	.000	-	-	-
