= 2003 NCAA Division III men's ice hockey tournament =

- Teams: 9
- Finals site: Kreitzberg Arena, Northfield, Vermont
- Champions: Norwich Cadets (2nd title)
- Runner-up: Oswego State Lakers (2nd title game)
- Semifinalists: Middlebury Panthers (7th Frozen Four); St. Norbert Green Knights (1st Frozen Four)
- Winning coach: Mike McShane (2nd title)
- Attendance: 12,609

The 2003 NCAA Division III Men's Ice Hockey Tournament was the culmination of the 2002–03 season, the 20th such tournament in NCAA history. It concluded with Norwich defeating Oswego State in the championship game 2–1. All First Round and Quarterfinal matchups were held at home team venues, while all succeeding games were played in Northfield, Vermont, where Norwich University coincidentally hosted the Frozen Four the year they won.

== Qualifying teams ==
The following teams qualified for the tournament. Automatic bids were offered to the conference tournament champion of seven different conferences with one at-large bid for the best remaining team from each region.

East							West						
Seed	School	Conference	Record	Berth Type	Appearance	Last Bid	Seed	School	Conference	Record	Berth Type	Appearance	Last Bid
1	Middlebury (2)	NESCAC	21–4–2	At–Large	9th	2002	1	St. Norbert (1)	NCHA	26–1–2	Tournament Champion	5th	2002
2	Oswego State (3)	SUNYAC	23–6–1	Tournament Champion	7th	1998	2	Wisconsin–River Falls	NCHA	22–6–1	At–Large	9th	2001
3	Norwich (4)	ECAC East	24–3–0	Tournament Champion	6th	2002	3	Saint John's	MIAC	20–6–1	Tournament Champion	4th	2001
4	Trinity	NESCAC	19–5–2	Tournament Champion	1st	Never							
5	Wentworth	ECAC Northeast	21–4–3	Tournament Champion	3rd	2002							
6	Elmira	ECAC West	18–7–2	Tournament Champion	9th	1997							

== Format ==
The tournament featured four rounds of play. All rounds were Single-game elimination. For the three eastern Quarterfinals, the teams were seeded according to their rankings with the top three teams serving as hosts. For the western quarterfinal, the top-ranked team awaited the winner of a play-in game between the lower-ranked teams. The quarterfinal brackets were arranged so that were all higher-seeded teams to advance, the first overall seed would play the fourth overall seed in the semifinals.

== Tournament bracket ==
First Round; March 12
W2	Wisconsin–River Falls	2
W3	Saint John's	0

Quarterfinals; March 15
W1	St. Norbert (1)	5
W2	Wisconsin–River Falls	2
E3	Norwich (4)	6
E4	Trinity	4
E1	Middlebury (2)	5
E6	Elmira	1
E2	Oswego State (3)	4
E5	Wentworth	3

Semifinals; March 21
W1	St. Norbert (1)	3
E3	Norwich (4)	6
E1	Middlebury (2)	0
E2	Oswego State (3)	6

National Championship; March 22
E3	Norwich (4)	2
E2	Oswego State (3)	1

Note: * denotes overtime period(s)

== First round ==
=== (W2) Wisconsin–River Falls vs. (W3) Saint John’s ===
March 12	Wisconsin–River Falls	2 – 0	Saint John's	Hunt Arena
No scoring		First period	No scoring
No scoring		Second period	No scoring
14:15 – Nate Hansen (5); 19:36 – en – Marc-André Lalande (5)		Third period	No scoring
Jacque Vezina (31 saves / 31 shots)		Goalie stats	Rick Gregory (20 saves / 21 shots)

== Quarterfinals ==
=== (W1) St. Norbert vs. (W2) Wisconsin–River Falls ===
March 15	St. Norbert	5 – 2	Wisconsin–River Falls	Cornerstone Community Center
10:03 – Michael Buchan (17)		First period	No scoring
05:43 – Connor Hughes (12); 08:37 – Kelly Wosnack (10); 12:05 – Terry Wilson (5)		Second period	Aaron Degerness (11) – pp – 00:20
19:43 – en – Brant Kersey (6)		Third period	Mike Salmela (4) – pp – 08:34
Chancy Colquhoun (16 saves / 18 shots)		Goalie stats	Jacque Vezina (22 saves / 26 shots)

=== (E3) Norwich vs. (E4) Trinity ===
March 15	Norwich	5 – 4	Trinity	Kreitzberg Arena
No scoring		First period	Ryan Stevens (20) – 08:08; Joe Ori (17) – 14:39
08:37 – Jon Bokelmann (9)		Second period	Cameron Finch (13) – 09:08; Steven LaBrie (13) – 17:10
03:01 – pp – Phil Aucoin (15); 06:49 – Matt Schmidt (22); 07:01 – Paul Mattucci (14); 13:54 – Dominick Dawes (5)		Third period	No scoring
Mike Boudreau (17 saves / 21 shots); Randy Hevey (8 saves / 8 shots)		Goalie stats	Douglas Kisielius (29 saves / 34 shots)

=== (E1) Middlebury vs. (E6) Elmira ===
March 15	Middlebury	5 – 1	Elmira	Kenyon Arena
07:58 – Patrick Nugent (7)		First period	No scoring
17:58 – pp – Kevin Cooper (25)		Second period	Pierre Rivard (14) – 08:25
00:37 – Patrick Nugent (8); 12:29 – Robert Chisholm (12); 15:51 – pp – Kevin Cooper (26)		Third period	No scoring
Yen-I Chen (27 saves / 28 shots)		Goalie stats	Greg Fargo (37 saves / 42 shots)

=== (E2) Oswego State vs. (E5) Wentworth ===
March 15	Oswego State	4 – 3	Wentworth	Golden Romney Fieldhouse
00:51 – Mike Lukajic (31); 10:14 – Brady Crooks (3)		First period	Mike Prsa (8) – 02:01; Dave Zelasko (17) – pp – 13:12
14:25 – pp – John Hirliman (19)		Second period	No scoring
19:08 – Rob Smith (17)		Third period	Jayden Der (9) – 12:26
Tyson Gajda (31 saves / 34 shots)		Goalie stats	Jamie Vanek (34 saves / 38 shots)

== Semifinals ==
=== (W1) St. Norbert vs. (E3) Norwich ===
March 21	Norwich	6 – 3	St. Norbert	Kreitzberg Arena
Lou DiMasi III (7) – pp – 08:24		First period	No scoring
Kurtis McLean (25) – sh – 03:46		Second period	01:35 – Mike Costley (9); 19:01 – Lenny Rampone (6)
Phil Aucoin (16) – 00:31; Ed Boudreau (16) – 00:58; Aaron Lee (12) – 16:42; Marshall Lee (4) – en – 19:32		Third period	11:01 – pp – Māris Ziediņš (18)
Mike Boudreau (24 saves / 27 shots)		Goalie stats	Chancy Colquhoun (27 saves / 32 shots)

=== (E1) Middlebury vs. (E2) Oswego State ===
March 21	Middlebury	0 – 6	Oswego State	Kreitzberg Arena
No scoring		First period	Mike Lukajic (32) – 16:06
No scoring		Second period	No scoring
No scoring		Third period	Gary Bowman (15) – 02:50; Mike Lukajic (33) – 09:43; Tim Thomas (3) – 10:35; Gary Bowman (16) – en – 14:12; Paul Perrier (2) – 14:49
Yen-I Chen (30 saves / 34 shots); Marc Scheuer (3 saves / 4 shots)		Goalie stats	Tyson Gajda (33 saves / 33 shots)

== National Championship ==
=== (E2) Oswego State vs. (E3) Norwich ===
March 22	Norwich	2 – 1	Oswego State	Kreitzberg Arena
No scoring		First period	No scoring
No scoring		Second period	18:04 – pp – John Hirliman (19)
Aaron Lee (13) – 05:50; Toza Crnilovic (4) – 07:01		Third period	No scoring
Mike Boudreau (21 saves / 22 shots)		Goalie stats	Tyson Gajda (34 saves / 36 shots)

== Record by conference ==
Conference	# of Bids	Record	Win %	Frozen Four	Championship Game	Champions
NCHA	2	2–2	.500	1	-	-
NESCAC	2	1–2	.333	1	-	-
ECAC East	1	3–0	1.000	1	1	1
SUNYAC	1	2–1	.667	1	1	-
ECAC West	1	0–1	.000	-	-	-
ECAC Northeast	1	0–1	.000	-	-	-
MIAC	1	0–1	.000	-	-	-
