= 1999 NCAA Division III men's ice hockey tournament =

- Teams: 8
- Finals site: Kreitzberg Arena; Norwich, Vermont
- Champions: Middlebury Panthers (5th title)
- Runner-up: Wisconsin–Superior Yellowjackets (3rd title game)
- Semifinalists: RIT Tigers (6th Frozen Four); Norwich Cadets (2nd Frozen Four)
- Winning coach: Bill Beaney (5th title)
- Attendance: 15,621

The 1999 NCAA Division III Men's Ice Hockey Tournament was the culmination of the 1998–99 season, the 16th such tournament in NCAA history. It concluded with Middlebury defeating Wisconsin-Superior in the championship game 5-0. All Quarterfinals matchups were held at home team venues, while all succeeding games were played in Norwich, Vermont.

The championship marked the fifth in a row for Middlebury.

== Qualifying teams ==
The following teams qualified for the tournament. There were no automatic bids, however, conference tournament champions were given preferential consideration. No formal seeding was used while quarterfinal matches were arranged so that the road teams would have the shortest possible travel distances.

East						West					
School	Conference	Record	Berth Type	Appearance	Last Bid	School	Conference	Record	Berth Type	Appearance	Last Bid
Amherst	ECAC East	19–3–0	At-Large	1st	Never	St. Norbert	NCHA	24–4–3	Tournament Champion	3rd	1998
Middlebury	ECAC East	18–4–1	At-Large	5th	1998	St. Thomas	MIAC	16–11–2	Tournament Champion	8th	1994
Norwich	ECAC East	25–1–1	Tournament Champion	3rd	1997	Wisconsin–Superior	NCHA	20–7–2	At-Large	7th	1997
Plattsburgh State	SUNYAC	23–4–2	Tournament Champion	8th	1998						
RIT	ECAC West	25–1–2	Tournament Champion	9th	1998						

== Format ==
The tournament featured three rounds of play. In the Quarterfinals, teams played a two-game series where the first team to reach 3 points was declared a winner (2 points for winning a game, 1 point each for tying). If both teams ended up with 2 points after the first two games a 20-minute mini-game used to determine a winner. Mini-game scores are in italics. Beginning with the semifinals all games became Single-game eliminations. The winning teams in the semifinals advanced to the National Championship Game with the losers playing in a Third Place game. The teams were seeded according to geographic proximity in the quarterfinals so the visiting team would have the shortest feasible distance to travel.

== Bracket ==
Quarterfinals; March 12–13
St. Norbert	4	3	0
Middlebury	2	6	2
RIT	7	6	-
Amherst	2	2	-
Wisconsin–Superior	5	4	-
St. Thomas	5	3	-
Norwich	4	3	-
Plattsburgh State	4	2	-

Semifinals; March 19
Middlebury	9
RIT	3
Wisconsin–Superior	4
Norwich	2

National championship March 20
Middlebury	5
Wisconsin–Superior	0
Third-place game
RIT	2
Norwich	9

Note: * denotes overtime period(s)
Note: Mini-games in italics

== Record by conference ==
Conference	# of Bids	Record	Win %	Frozen Four	Championship Game	Champions
ECAC East	3	5–4–1	.550	2	1	1
NCHA	2	3–2–1	.583	1	1	-
ECAC West	1	2–2–0	.500	1	-	-
SUNYAC	1	0–1–1	.250	-	-	-
MIAC	1	0–1–1	.250	-	-	-
