= 2007 NCAA Division III men's ice hockey tournament =

Ice hockey tournament

- Teams: 10
- Finals site: Wessman Arena; Superior, Wisconsin
- Champions: Oswego State Lakers (1st title)
- Runner-up: Middlebury Panthers (9th title game)
- Semifinalists: Manhattanville Valiants (1st Frozen Four); St. Norbert Green Knights (4th Frozen Four)
- Winning coach: Ed Gosek (1st title)
- Attendance: 12,087

The 2007 NCAA Division III Men's Ice Hockey Tournament was the culmination of the 2006–07 season, the 24th such tournament in NCAA history. It concluded with Oswego State defeating Middlebury in the championship game 4-3 in overtime. All First Round and Quarterfinal matchups were held at home team venues, while all succeeding games were played at the Wessman Arena in Superior, Wisconsin.

== Qualifying teams ==
The following teams qualified for the tournament. Automatic bids were offered to the conference tournament champion of seven different conferences. One at-large bid was available for the best non-conference champion for each region with one additional at-large bid for the best remaining team regardless of region.

East							West						
Seed	School	Conference	Record	Berth Type	Appearance	Last Bid	Seed	School	Conference	Record	Berth Type	Appearance	Last Bid
1	Massachusetts–Dartmouth	ECAC Northeast	25–2–1	Tournament Champion	2nd	2006	1	St. Norbert	NCHA	24–3–2	Tournament Champion	9th	2006
2	Manhattanville	ECAC West	20–1–5	Tournament Champion	3rd	2006	2	Wisconsin–River Falls	NCHA	21–5–2	At–Large	11th	2004
3	Oswego State	SUNYAC	20–3–3	At–Large	8th	2003	3	Bethel	MIAC	17–9–1	Tournament Champion	1st	Never
4	Norwich	ECAC East	20–7–0	At–Large	9th	2006							
5	Babson	ECAC East	18–9–1	Tournament Champion	11th	1993							
6	Middlebury	NESCAC	17–7–3	Tournament Champion	13th	2006							
7	Fredonia State	SUNYAC	15–9–4	Tournament Champion	3rd	1995							

== Format ==
The tournament featured four rounds of play. All rounds were Single-game elimination. For the three eastern Quarterfinals the teams were seeded according to their rankings. The two lowest-seeded eastern teams played a first round game while the remaining five teams received byes into Quarterfinal round. The top-seeded eastern team played the winner of the eastern first round game. For the western quarterfinal, the top-ranked team awaited the winner of a first round game between the lower-ranked teams. The higher-seeded team served as host for each game of the first round and quarterfinals.

== Tournament Bracket ==
First Round; March 7
W2	Wisconsin–River Falls	1
W3	Bethel	2
E6	Middlebury	9
E7	Fredonia State	0

Quarterfinals; March 10
W1	St. Norbert	4
W3	Bethel	1
E3	Oswego State	3
E4	Norwich	0
E1	Massachusetts–Dartmouth	2
E6	Middlebury	3
E2	Manhattanville	5
E5	Babson	3

Semifinals; March 17
W1	St. Norbert	3
E3	Oswego State	4*
E6	Middlebury	3
E2	Manhattanville	2

National Championship; March 18
E3	Oswego State	4*
E6	Middlebury	3

Note: * denotes overtime period(s)

== Record by conference ==
Conference	# of Bids	Record	Win %	Frozen Four	Championship Game	Champions
SUNYAC	2	3–1	.750	1	1	1
NCHA	2	1–2	.333	1	-	-
ECAC East	2	0–2	.000	-	-	-
NESCAC	1	3–1	.750	1	1	-
MIAC	1	1–1	.500	-	-	-
ECAC West	1	1–1	.500	1	-	-
ECAC Northeast	1	0–1	.000	-	-	-
