= 2005 NCAA Division III men's ice hockey tournament =

- Teams: 9
- Finals site: Kenyon Arena, Middlebury, Vermont
- Champions: Middlebury Panthers (7th title)
- Runner-up: St. Thomas Tommies (2nd title game)
- Semifinalists: Trinity Bantams (1st Frozen Four); New England College Pilgrims (1st Frozen Four)
- Winning coach: Bill Beaney (7th title)
- Attendance: 11,905

The 2005 NCAA Division III Men's Ice Hockey Tournament was the culmination of the 2004–05 season, the 22nd such tournament in NCAA history. It concluded with Middlebury defeating St. Thomas in the championship game 5-0. All First Round and Quarterfinal matchups were held at home team venues, while all succeeding games were played in Middlebury, Vermont.

== Qualifying teams ==
The following teams qualified for the tournament. Automatic bids were offered to the conference tournament champion of seven different conferences with one at-large bid for the best remaining team from each region.

East							West						
Seed	School	Conference	Record	Berth Type	Appearance	Last Bid	Seed	School	Conference	Record	Berth Type	Appearance	Last Bid
1	Manhattanville	ECAC West	20–4–1	Tournament Champion	1st	Never	1	St. Norbert	NCHA	24–2–3	Tournament Champion	7th	2004
2	Middlebury	NESCAC	20–4–3	Tournament Champion	11th	2004	2	Saint John's	MIAC	23–2–2	At–Large	5th	2003
3	Geneseo State	SUNYAC	18–6–4	Tournament Champion	2nd	1990	3	St. Thomas	MIAC	17–5–5	Tournament Champion	12th	2004
4	Trinity	NESCAC	20–3–2	At–Large	2nd	2003							
5	Curry	ECAC Northeast	19–5–3	Tournament Champion	2nd	2004							
6	New England College	ECAC East	17–11–0	Tournament Champion	3rd	2001							

== Format ==
The tournament featured four rounds of play. All rounds were Single-game elimination. For the three eastern Quarterfinals the teams were seeded according to their rankings with the top three teams serving as hosts. For the western quarterfinal, the top-ranked team awaited the winner of a play-in game between the lower-ranked teams.

== Tournament bracket ==
First Round; March 9
W2	Saint John's	1
W3	St. Thomas	4

Quarterfinals; March 12
W1	St. Norbert	2
W3	St. Thomas	3
E3	Geneseo State	0
E4	Trinity	4
E2	Middlebury	6
E5	Curry	0
E1	Manhattanville	2
E6	New England College	4

Semifinals; March 18
W3	St. Thomas	4
E4	Trinity	1
E2	Middlebury	5
E6	New England College	2

National Championship; March 19
W3	St. Thomas	0
E2	Middlebury	5

Note: * denotes overtime period(s)

== First round ==
=== (W2) Saint John's vs. (W3) Saint John’s ===
March	Saint John's	1 – 4	St. Thomas	National Hockey Center
No scoring		First period	Dan Krmpotich (19) – 00:52
No scoring		Second period	Dan Krmpotich (20) – 10:08
16:57 – Mike Hanke (7)		Third period	Anthony Blumer (13) – 00:24; Colin Greenlees (6) – 16:03
Adam Hanna (42 saves / 46 shots)		Goalie stats	Zach Sikich (30 saves / 31 shots)

== Quarterfinals ==
=== (W1) St. Norbert vs. (W3) St. Thomas ===
March 12	St. Norbert	2 – 3	St. Thomas	Cornerstone Community Center
No scoring		First period	Brandon Wilcox (14) – 14:54
16:58 – pp – Jason Deitsch (15)		Second period	Ryan Hoehn (10) – 04:31; Kevin Rollwagen (7) – 07:17
00:33 – Jason Deitsch (16)		Third period	No scoring
Kyle Jones (21 saves / 24 shots)		Goalie stats	Zach Sikich (40 saves / 42 shots)

=== (E3) Geneseo State vs. (E4) Trinity ===
March 12	Geneseo State	0 – 4	Trinity	Ira S. Wilson Ice Arena
No scoring		First period	Thomas Wenstrom (4) – 10:48
No scoring		Second period	No scoring
No scoring		Third period	Bryan Crabtree (11) – pp – 00:06; Richard Masucci (3) – 16:00; Bryan Crabtree (12) – en – 19:07
Brett Walker (31 saves / 34 shots)		Goalie stats	Douglas Kisielius (32 saves / 32 shots)

=== (E2) Middlebury vs. (E5) Curry ===
March 12	Middlebury	6 – 0	Curry	Canton Ice House
11:37 – Jocko DeCarolis (5)		First period	No scoring
11:51 – Eric LaFreniere (5); 12:46 – pp – Brett Shirreffs (1); 13:44 – pp – Levi Doria (2)		Second period	No scoring
03:01 – Robert MacIntyre (5); 17:06 – Samuel Driver (2)		Third period	No scoring
Ross Cherry (29 saves / 29 shots)		Goalie stats	Lenny Mosca (27 saves / 31 shots); Michael Ronan (11 saves / 11 shots)

== Record by conference ==
Conference	# of Bids	Record	Win %	Frozen Four	Championship Game	Champions
NESCAC	2	4–1	.800	2	1	1
MIAC	2	3–2	.600	1	1	-
ECAC East	1	1–1	.500	1	-	-
NCHA	1	0–1	.000	-	-	-
SUNYAC	1	0–1	.000	-	-	-
ECAC West	1	0–1	.000	-	-	-
ECAC Northeast	1	0–1	.000	-	-	-
