= 1989 NCAA Division III men's ice hockey tournament =

- Teams: 8
- Finals site: Frank Ritter Memorial Ice Arena, Rochester, New York
- Champions: Wisconsin–Stevens Point Pointers (1st title)
- Runner-up: RIT Tigers (3rd title game)
- Semifinalists: Babson Beavers (3rd Frozen Four); Bemidji State Beavers (5th Frozen Four)
- Winning coach: Mark Mazzoleni (1st title)
- MOP: Shawn Wheeler (Wisconsin–Stevens Point)
- Attendance: 19,171

The 1989 NCAA Division III Men's Ice Hockey Tournament was the culmination of the 1988–89 season, the 6th such tournament in NCAA history. It concluded with Wisconsin-Stevens Point defeating RIT in the championship series with 1 win and 1 tie. All Quarterfinals matchups were held at home team venues, while all succeeding games were played in Rochester, New York.

== Qualifying teams ==
The following teams qualified for the tournament. There were no automatic bids, however, conference tournament champions were given preferential consideration. No formal seeding was used while quarter and semifinal matches were arranged so that the road teams would have the shortest possible travel distances. Because the semifinal series were played at home team venues the NCAA elected to select an equal amount of eastern and western teams.

East						West					
School	Conference	Record	Berth Type	Appearance	Last Bid	School	Conference	Record	Berth Type	Appearance	Last Bid
Babson	ECAC East	18–8–1	At-Large	6th	1988	Bemidji State	NCHA	17–11–4	At-Large	5th	1988
Oswego State	ECAC West	17–9–1	At-Large	4th	1988	Saint Mary's	MIAC	20–8–1	Tournament Champion	1st	Never
RIT	ECAC West	23–6–1	Tournament Champion	4th	1986	Wisconsin–Eau Claire	NCHA	15–10–5	At-Large	1st	Never
Union	ECAC West	19–7–1	At-Large	4th	1986	Wisconsin–Stevens Point	NCHA	29–5–1	Tournament Champion	2nd	1988

== Format ==
The tournament featured three rounds of play. Starting in 1988, each round of the tournament consisted of a two-game series where the first team to reach 3 points was declared a winner (2 points for winning a game, 1 point each for tying). If both teams ended up with 2 points after the first two games a 20-minute mini-game used to determine a winner. Mini-game scores are in italics. The teams were seeded according to geographic proximity in the quarterfinals so the visiting team would have the shortest feasible distance to travel.

== Bracket ==
Quarterfinals; March 10–12
Oswego State	7	2	1
RIT	5	5	4
Babson	1	3	-
Union	1	2	-
Wisconsin–Stevens Point	5	5	-
Wisconsin–Eau Claire	2	3	-
Bemidji State	5	7	-
Saint Mary's	4	2	-

Semifinals; March 17–18
RIT	6	7	-
Babson	2	5	-
Wisconsin–Stevens Point	11	6	-
Bemidji State	0	3	-

National Championship; March 24–25
RIT	3	2	-
Wisconsin–Stevens Point	3	3	-

Note: * denotes overtime period(s)
Note: Mini-games in italics

== Record by conference ==
Conference	# of Bids	Record	Win %	Frozen Four	Championship Game	Champions
NCHA	3	7–4–1	.625	2	1	1
ECAC West	3	4–4–2	.500	1	1	-
ECAC East	1	1–2–1	.375	1	-	-
MIAC	1	0–2–0	.000	-	-	-
