= 1988 NCAA Division III men's ice hockey tournament =

- Teams: 8
- Finals site: Murray Athletic Center, Elmira, New York
- Champions: Wisconsin-River Falls Falcons (1st title)
- Runner-up: Elmira Soaring Eagles (1st title game)
- Semifinalists: Babson Beavers (2nd Frozen Four); Bemidji State Beavers (4th Frozen Four)
- Winning coach: Rick Kozuback (1st title)
- Attendance: 21,723

The 1988 NCAA Division III Men's Ice Hockey Tournament was the culmination of the 1987–88 season, the 5th such tournament in NCAA history. It concluded with Wisconsin-River Falls defeating Elmira in the championship series 3–0 in the deciding mini-game. All Quarterfinals matchups were held at home team venues, while all succeeding games were played in Elmira, New York.

Plattsburgh State's tournament performance was later vacated due to NCAA violations.

The NCAA stopped naming an all-tournament team beginning with this tournament. The all-tournament team would next be awarded in 2009. Additionally, the Tournament Most Outstanding Player was not awarded but it would be conferred the following season.

== Qualifying teams ==
The following teams qualified for the tournament. There were no automatic bids, however, conference tournament champions were given preferential consideration. No formal seeding was used while quarter and semifinal matches were arranged so that the road teams would have the shortest possible travel distances. Because the semifinal series were played at home team venues the NCAA elected to select an equal amount of eastern and western teams.

East						West					
School	Conference	Record	Berth Type	Appearance	Last Bid	School	Conference	Record	Berth Type	Appearance	Last Bid
Babson	ECAC East	22–7–0	At-Large	5th	1987	Bemidji State	NCHA	22–9–3	At-Large	4th	1987
Elmira	ECAC West	23–4–0	Tournament Champion	2nd	1986	St. Thomas	MIAC	21–8–0	Tournament Champion	4th	1986
Oswego State	ECAC West	20–8–0	At-Large	3rd	1987	Wisconsin–River Falls	NCHA	26–5–1	Tournament Champion	2nd	1984
Plattsburgh State	ECAC West	23–11–0	At-Large	(vacated)	1987	Wisconsin–Stevens Point	NCHA	18–7–2	At-Large	1st	Never

== Format ==
The tournament featured three rounds of play. Starting in 1988, each round of the tournament consisted of a two-game series with a 20-minute mini-game used to determine a winner. Mini-game scores are in italics. Also, in 1988, the third-place game was discontinued. The teams were seeded according to geographic proximity in the quarterfinals so the visiting team would have the shortest feasible distance to travel.

== Bracket ==
Quarterfinals; March 11–13
Elmira	6	10	-
Oswego State	3	2	-
Babson	5	2	1
Plattsburgh State	2	3	0
Wisconsin–River Falls	6	9	-
Wisconsin–Stevens Point	5	5	-
Bemidji State	5	3	-
St. Thomas	1	1	-

Semifinals; March 18–19
Elmira	3	9	2
Babson	4	1	1
Wisconsin–River Falls	6	5	-
Bemidji State	4	3	-

National Championship; March 25–26
Elmira	1	5	0
Wisconsin–River Falls	7	3	3

Note: * denotes overtime period(s)
Note: Mini-games in italics

== Record by conference ==
Conference	# of Bids	Record	Win %	Frozen Four	Championship Game	Champions
NCHA	3	7–5	.583	2	1	1
ECAC West	2	4–4	.500	1	1	-
ECAC East	1	2–2	.500	1	-	-
MIAC	1	0–2	.000	-	-	-

Plattsburgh State's record not included
