= 2001 NCAA Division III men's ice hockey tournament =

- Teams: 8
- Finals site: Frank Ritter Memorial Ice Arena, Rochester, New York
- Champions: Plattsburgh State Cardinals (2nd title)
- Runner-up: RIT Tigers (5th title game)
- Semifinalists: Wisconsin–Superior Yellowjackets (8th Frozen Four); Wisconsin–River Falls Falcons (6th Frozen Four)
- Winning coach: Bob Emery (2nd title)
- Attendance: 17,675

The 2001 NCAA Division III Men's Ice Hockey Tournament was the culmination of the 2000–01 season, the 18th such tournament in NCAA history. It concluded with Plattsburgh State defeating RIT in the championship game 6-2. All Quarterfinals matchups were held at home team venues, while all succeeding games were played in Rochester, New York.

== Qualifying teams ==
The following teams qualified for the tournament. Automatic bids were offered to the conference tournament champion of seven different conferences with one at-large bid for the best remaining team. No formal seeding was used while quarterfinal matches were arranged so that the road teams would have the shortest possible travel distances.

East						West					
School	Conference	Record	Berth Type	Appearance	Last Bid	School	Conference	Record	Berth Type	Appearance	Last Bid
Lebanon Valley	ECAC Northeast	18–7–2	Tournament Champion	1st	Never	Saint John's	MIAC	15–10–4	Tournament Champion	3rd	1997
Middlebury	NESCAC	23–2–1	Tournament Champion	7th	2000	Wisconsin–River Falls	NCHA	21–8–2	At-Large	8th	1998
New England College	ECAC East	20–8–0	Tournament Champion	2nd	1984	Wisconsin–Superior	NCHA	27–3–1	Tournament Champion	9th	2000
Plattsburgh State	SUNYAC	25–5–0	Tournament Champion	10th	2000						
RIT	ECAC West	24–0–1	Tournament Champion	11th	2000						

== Format ==
The tournament featured three rounds of play. In the Quarterfinals, teams played a two-game series where the first team to reach 3 points was declared a winner (2 points for winning a game, 1 point each for tying). If both teams ended up with 2 points after the first two games a 20-minute mini-game used to determine a winner. Mini-game scores are in italics. Beginning with the Semifinals all games became Single-game eliminations. The winning teams in the semifinals advanced to the National Championship Game with the losers playing in a Third Place game. The teams were seeded according to geographic proximity in the quarterfinals so the visiting team would have the shortest feasible distance to travel.

== Bracket ==
Quarterfinals
RIT	8	10	-
Lebanon Valley	1	2	-
Wisconsin–River Falls	8	2	-
New England College	1	1	-
Wisconsin–Superior	5	4	-
Saint John's	4	0	-
Plattsburgh State	3	5	-
Middlebury	1	2	-

Semifinals
RIT	5
Wisconsin–River Falls	2
Wisconsin–Superior	3
Plattsburgh State	5

National Championship
RIT	2
Plattsburgh State	6
Third Place Game
Wisconsin–River Falls	1
Wisconsin–Superior	3

Note: * denotes overtime period(s)
Note: Mini-games in italics

== Record by conference ==
Conference	# of Bids	Record	Win %	Frozen Four	Championship Game	Champions
NCHA	2	5–3–0	.625	2	-	-
SUNYAC	1	4–0–0	1.000	1	1	1
ECAC West	1	3–1–0	.750	1	1	-
NESCAC	1	0–2–0	.000	-	-	-
ECAC East	1	0–2–0	.000	-	-	-
ECAC Northeast	1	0–2–0	.000	-	-	-
MIAC	1	0–2–0	.000	-	-	-
