= 2000 NCAA Division III men's ice hockey tournament =

- Teams: 8
- Finals site: Wessman Arena; Superior, Wisconsin
- Champions: Norwich Cadets (1st title)
- Runner-up: St. Thomas Tommies (1st title game)
- Semifinalists: Wisconsin–Superior Yellowjackets (7th Frozen Four); Plattsburgh State Cardinals (6th Frozen Four)
- Winning coach: Mike McShane (1st title)
- Attendance: 16,417

The 2000 NCAA Division III Men's Ice Hockey Tournament was the culmination of the 1999–00 season, the 17th such tournament in NCAA history. It concluded with Norwich defeating St. Thomas in the championship game 2-1. All Quarterfinals matchups were held at home team venues, while all succeeding games were played in Superior, Wisconsin.

The NCAA began offering automatic bids to conference tournament champions for the first time. Seven of the eight existing conferences received automatic bids with only the MCHA not included. This was because the MCHA had a Division II program who participated in their conference tournament; both ECAC East and ECAC Northeast had Division II members as well but none of those team participated in their respective conference tournaments. This allowed the results to be certified as Division III.

With the NESCAC now sponsoring ice hockey as a sport and holding an individual conference tournament, the conference rules limiting member schools to only one postseason tournament were dropped.

Despite being in Division III since 1973, ECAC Northeast received its first entry into the national tournament.

== Qualifying teams ==
The following teams qualified for the tournament. Automatic bids were offered to the conference tournament champion of seven different conferences with one at-large bid for the best remaining team. No formal seeding was used while quarterfinal matches were arranged so that the road teams would have the shortest possible travel distances.

East						West					
School	Conference	Record	Berth Type	Appearance	Last Bid	School	Conference	Record	Berth Type	Appearance	Last Bid
Middlebury	NESCAC	20–5–1	Tournament Champion	6th	1999	Concordia (MN)	MIAC	20–7–2	Tournament Champion	2nd	1987
Norwich	ECAC East	25–2–1	Tournament Champion	4th	1999	St. Thomas	MIAC	24–3–2	At-Large	9th	1999
Plattsburgh State	SUNYAC	25–3–1	Tournament Champion	9th	1999	Wisconsin–Superior	NCHA	22–8–1	Tournament Champion	8th	1999
RIT	ECAC West	21–5–1	Tournament Champion	10th	1999						
Wentworth	ECAC Northeast	17–10–1	Tournament Champion	1st	Never						

== Format ==
The tournament featured three rounds of play. In the Quarterfinals, teams played a two-game series where the first team to reach 3 points was declared a winner (2 points for winning a game, 1 point each for tying). If both teams ended up with 2 points after the first two games a 20-minute mini-game used to determine a winner. Mini-game scores are in italics. Beginning with the Semifinals all games became Single-game eliminations. The winning teams in the semifinals advanced to the National Championship Game with the losers playing in a Third Place game. The teams were seeded according to geographic proximity in the quarterfinals so the visiting team would have the shortest feasible distance to travel.

== Bracket ==
Quarterfinals
Norwich	4	5	-
RIT	1	1	-
Wisconsin–Superior	3	4	-
Concordia (MN)	2	1	-
St. Thomas	6	10	-
Wentworth	0	3	-
Middlebury	1	4	0
Plattsburgh State	1	4	1

Semifinals
Norwich	5*
Wisconsin–Superior	4
St. Thomas	7
Plattsburgh State	1

National Championship
Norwich	2
St. Thomas	1
Third Place Game
Wisconsin–Superior	0
Plattsburgh State	2

Note: * denotes overtime period(s)
Note: Mini-games in italics

== Record by conference ==
Conference	# of Bids	Record	Win %	Frozen Four	Championship Game	Champions
MIAC	2	3–3–0	.500	1	1	-
ECAC East	1	4–0–0	1.000	1	1	1
NCHA	1	2–2–0	.500	1	-	-
SUNYAC	1	1–1–2	.500	1	-	-
NESCAC	1	0–0–2	.500	-	-	-
ECAC West	1	0–2–0	.000	-	-	-
ECAC Northeast	1	0–2–0	.000	-	-	-
