= 2009 NCAA Division III men's ice hockey tournament =

- Teams: 11
- Finals site: Herb Brooks Arena, Lake Placid, New York
- Champions: Neumann Knights (1st title)
- Runner-up: Gustavus Adolphus Golden Gusties (1st title game)
- Semifinalists: Hobart Statesmen (2nd Frozen Four); Wisconsin–Stout Blue Devils (1st Frozen Four)
- Winning coach: Dominick Dawes (1st title)
- MOP: Ross MacKinnon (Neumann)
- Attendance: 10,102

The 2009 NCAA Division III Men's Ice Hockey Tournament was the culmination of the 2008–09 season, the 26th such tournament in NCAA history. It concluded with Neumann defeating Gustavus Adolphus in the championship game 4-1. All First Round and Quarterfinal matchups were held at home team venues, while all succeeding games were played at the Herb Brooks Arena in Lake Placid, New York.

Neumann became the first team to win the tournament by playing in four different rounds.

== Qualifying teams ==
The following teams qualified for the tournament. Automatic bids were offered to the conference tournament champion of seven different conferences. Four at-large bids were available for the highest-ranked non-conference tournament champions (overall seed in parentheses).

East							West						
Seed	School	Conference	Record	Berth Type	Appearance	Last Bid	Seed	School	Conference	Record	Berth Type	Appearance	Last Bid
1	Plattsburgh State (1)	SUNYAC	24–1–2	Tournament Champion	14th	2008	1	Wisconsin–Superior (2)	NCHA	23–3–3	At–Large	12th	2006
2	Amherst (4)	NESCAC	21–4–1	Tournament Champion	2nd	1999	2	Wisconsin–Stout (3)	NCHA	22–5–2	Tournament Champion	2nd	2008
3	Hobart	ECAC West	19–6–2	At–Large	4th	2008	3	St. Scholastica	NCHA	20–6–2	At–Large	1st	Never
4	Elmira	ECAC West	16–7–3	At–Large	12th	2008	4	Gustavus Adolphus	MIAC	17–10–0	Tournament Champion	4th	1993
5	Neumann	ECAC West	17–9–2	Tournament Champion	1st	Never							
6	Nichols	ECAC Northeast	25–3–0	Tournament Champion	1st	Never							
7	Babson	ECAC East	13–13–1	Tournament Champion	12th	2007							

== Format ==
The tournament featured four rounds of play. All rounds were Single-game elimination. The top four teams were arranged so that were they all to reach the national semifinal, the first overall seed would play the fourth seed while the second seed would play the third seed. Because two western teams were among the top four overall seeds, the other two western teams were advanced to the quarterfinal round in order to prevent lower-seeded teams from having to travel long-distances in the first two rounds.

In the First Round, because each team was from the same region, the teams were seeded according to their ranking with the second seed playing the seventh seed, the third seed playing the sixth seed and the fourth seed playing the fifth seed. The Quarterfinal round was arranged so that the top eastern seed would play the winner between the fourth- and fifth-seeded eastern team while the winners of the other two first round matches would meet for the other eastern quarterfinal. In the western quarterfinals, the top western seed played the fourth western seed and the second western seed played the third western seed. The higher-ranked team served as host for all first round and quarterfinal meetings.

== Tournament Bracket ==
First Round; March 11
E4	Elmira	1
E5	Neumann	2
E2	Amherst	4
E7	Babson	1
E3	Hobart	3
E6	Nichols	0

Quarterfinals; March 14
E1	Plattsburgh State	4
E5	Neumann	5*
E2	Amherst	1
E3	Hobart	2*
W1	Wisconsin–Superior	0
W4	Gustavus Adolphus	2
W2	Wisconsin–Stout	2
W3	St. Scholastica	1

Semifinals; March 20
E5	Neumann	2
E3	Hobart	0
W4	Gustavus Adolphus	3*
W2	Wisconsin–Stout	2

National Championship; March 21
E5	Neumann	4
W4	Gustavus Adolphus	1

Note: * denotes overtime period(s)

== Results ==
=== First round ===
March 11, 2009; 7:00 PM	(E4) Elmira	1 – 2 (0–1, 0–1, 1–0)	(E5) Neumann	Murray Athletic Center – Horseheads, New York; Attendance: 860

Game reference

Casey Tuttle
Goalies
Ross MacKinnon
Referees:
Dan Murphy
Joel DuPre
Linesman:
Joseph Baudo

	0–1	05:32 – Ryan Heickert (4) (Cole, Rodell)
	0–2	27:06 – PP – Matt Ward (20) (Valois)
(Velich) Karl Linden (7) – 46:13	1–2

8 min
Penalties
14 min
33
Shots
26

March 11, 2009; 7:00 PM	(E2) Amherst	4 – 1 (0–0, 2–1, 2–0)	(E7) Babson	Orr Rink – Amherst, Massachusetts; Attendance: 300

Game reference

Jonathan LaRose
Goalies
Andrew Peabody
Referees:
Rick Santilli
Rob Tisi
Linesman:
Matt Bielak

(Collins, Landers) Brendan Powers (11) – 30:32	1–0
	1–1	29:56 – PP – Chris Wood (9) (Chenard-Poirier, Farrell)
(Burns, Rhone) Jeff Landers (9) – 32:11	2–1
(Collins, Covelli) Brendan Powers (12) – 57:51	3–1
(Covelli) Eddie Effinger (7) – 56:13	4–1

16 min
Penalties
8 min
42
Shots
49

March 11, 2009; 7:00 PM	(E3) Hobart	3 – 0 (0–0, 2–0, 1–0)	(E6) Nichols	Geneva Recreation Complex – Geneva, New York

Game reference

Keith Longo
Goalies
Jacob Rinn
Referees:
John Everett
Mike Jones
Linesman:
Drew White

(Bonham, Koval) Ryan Adler (3) – 28:17	1–0
(Organ) Gregory Alberti (5) – 37:43	2–0
(Zitoun, Moriarty) Bryant Harris (3) – 48:21	3–0

16 min
Penalties
12 min
37
Shots
35

=== Quarterfinals ===
March 14, 2009; 7:00 PM	(E1) Plattsburgh State	4 – 5 (OT) (1–1, 2–1, 1–2, 0–1)	(E5) Neumann	Ronald B. Stafford Ice Arena – Plattsburgh, New York; Attendance: 1,798

Game reference

Bryan Hince
Goalies
Ross MacKinnon
Referees:
Dan Murphy
John Everett
Linesman:
Joseph Baudo

	0–1	05:32 – Mike Hedden (17) (Casey)
(Corry, Greene) Phil Farrow (11) – 14:37	1–1
(Rolls, Smith) Phil Farrow (12) – PP – 28:49	2–1
	2–2	30:09 – Bill Foster (3)
(Willock, Corry) Joey Wilson (23) – 34:23	3–2
	3–3	46:55 – Kyle Casey (10) (Hedden, Ward)
(Corry, Dennis) Joey Wilson (24) – 54:12	4–3
	4–4	54:22 – Kyle Casey (11) (Hedden, Ward)
	4–5	62:35 – Bill Foster (4) (Stoyanovich, Schrock)

6 min
Penalties
20 min
29
Shots
27

March 14, 2009; 7:30 PM	(E2) Amherst	1 – 2 (OT) (0–1, 1–0, 0–0, 0–1)	(E3) Hobart	Orr Rink – Amherst, Massachusetts; Attendance: 275

Game reference

Cole Anderson
Goalies
Keith Longo
Referees:
Bob Collins
Tom Connors
Linesman:
Derek Merrill

	0–1	16:41 – Christopher Bower (8) (Organ, Alberti)
(Rhone, Landers) Keith Nelson (6) – 25:06	1–1
	1–2	71:40 – Jason Merritt (11)

18 min
Penalties
12 min
38
Shots
43

March 14, 2009; 7:00 PM	(W1) Wisconsin–Superior	0 – 2 (0–0, 0–1, 0–1)	(W4) Gustavus Adolphus	Wessman Arena – Superior, Wisconsin; Attendance: 1,483

Game reference
Chad Beiswenger	Goalies	Matthew Lopes	Referees: Tony Lancette; Steve Olson; Linesman: Dustin Martin
0–1 / 38:47 – Ross Ring-Jarvi (10) (Martinson, Wieck); 0–2 / 59:55 – EN – David Martinson (25)			Referees: Tony Lancette; Steve Olson; Linesman: Dustin Martin
4 min	Penalties	2 min	Referees: Tony Lancette; Steve Olson; Linesman: Dustin Martin
33	Shots	26	Referees: Tony Lancette; Steve Olson; Linesman: Dustin Martin

March 14, 2009; 7:05 PM	(E2) Wisconsin–Stout	2 – 1 (1–0, 0–1, 1–0)	(E3) St. Scholastica	Fanetti Community Center – Menomonie, Wisconsin; Attendance: 1,700

Game reference

Matt Koenig
Goalies
Steve Bounds
Referees:
John Boche
Dave Marcotte
Linesman:
Justin Schwantes

(Henderson, Larson) Andy Sternberg (9) – 25:06	1–0
	1–1	32:34 – Matt Stengl (4) (Chong, Milsom)
(Motz, Hanson) Jack Wolgemuth (4) – 59:23	2–1

8 min
Penalties
6 min
26
Shots
34

=== Semifinals ===
March 20, 2009; 7:45 PM	(E3) Hobart	0 – 2 (0–0, 0–0, 0–2)	(E5) Neumann	Herb Brooks Arena – Lake Placid, New York; Attendance: 3,036

Game reference
Keith Longo	Goalies	Ross MacKinnon	Referees: Dan Murphy; Dave Marcott; Linesman: Drew White
0–1 / 51:16 – PP – Matt Ward (21) (Casey); 0–2 / 59:20 – EN – Kaleigh Schrock (4) (Rodell)			Referees: Dan Murphy; Dave Marcott; Linesman: Drew White
6 min	Penalties	6 min	Referees: Dan Murphy; Dave Marcott; Linesman: Drew White
36	Shots	24	Referees: Dan Murphy; Dave Marcott; Linesman: Drew White

March 20, 2009; 4:00 PM	(W2) Wisconsin-Stout	2 – 3 (OT) (0–0, 1–2, 1–0, 0–1)	(W4) Gustavus Adolphus	Herb Brooks Arena – Lake Placid, New York; Attendance: 3,036

Game reference

Matt Koenig
Goalies
Matthew Lopes
Josh Swartout
Referees:
John Boche
John Everett
Linesman:
Joe Baudo

	0–1	25:32 – PP – Patrick Dynan (7) (R. Dyan, C. Dynan)
(Motz, Hanson) Joel Gaulrapp (6) – PP – 25:06	1–1
	1–2	34:40 – PP – Eric Bigham (14) (Carlson, Welch)
(Klaren, Hanson) Scott Motz (14) – 54:24	2–2
	2–3	66:31 – Patrick Dynan (8) (C. Dyan)

18 min
Penalties
16 min
34
Shots
38

=== National Championship ===
March 21, 2009; 5:00 PM	(W4) Gustavus Adolphus	1 – 4 (1–1, 0–3, 0–0)	(E5) Neumann	Herb Brooks Arena – Lake Placid, New York; Attendance: 3,141

Game reference

Matthew Lopes
Goalies
Ross MacKinnon
Referees:
Dan Murphy
Dave Marcotte
Linesman:
Joe Baudo

(Wieck) David Martinson (26) – 04:54	1–0
	1–1	12:52 – PP – Ryan Heickert (5) (Bianchini)
	1–2	23:06 – PP – Jesse Cole (15) (Heickert)
	1–3	26:53 – Jesse Cole (16) (Heickert, Gates)
	1–4	30:37 – PP – Marlon Gardner (16) (Paterson, Ward)

10 min
Penalties
10 min
25
Shots
22

== All-Tournament Team ==
- G: Ross MacKinnon* (Neumann)
- D: Andrew Brennan (Hobart)
- D: Charles Paterson (Neumann)
- F: Jesse Cole (Neumann)
- F: Patrick Dynan (Gustavus Adolphus)
- F: Matt Ward (Neumann)

* Most Outstanding Player(s)

== Record by conference ==
Conference	# of Bids	Record	Win %	Frozen Four	Championship Game	Champions
ECAC West	3	6–2	.750	2	1	1
NCHA	3	1–3	.250	1	-	-
MIAC	1	2–1	.667	1	1	-
NESCAC	1	1–1	.500	-	-	-
SUNYAC	1	0–1	.000	-	-	-
ECAC East	1	0–1	.000	-	-	-
ECAC Northeast	1	0–1	.000	-	-	-
