= 1990 NCAA Division III men's ice hockey tournament =

- Teams: 8
- Finals site: K.B. Willett Arena, Stevens Point, Wisconsin
- Champions: Wisconsin–Stevens Point Pointers (2nd title)
- Runner-up: Plattsburgh State Cardinals (1st title game)
- Semifinalists: Babson Beavers (4th Frozen Four); Mankato State Mavericks (2nd Frozen Four)
- Winning coach: Mark Mazzoleni (2nd title)
- MOP: Paul Caulfield (Wisconsin–Stevens Point)
- Attendance: 15,825

The 1990 NCAA Division III Men's Ice Hockey Tournament was the culmination of the 1989–90 season, the 7th such tournament in NCAA history. It concluded with Wisconsin-Stevens Point defeating Plattsburgh State in the championship series 1-0 in the deciding minigame. All Quarterfinals matchups were held at home team venues, while all succeeding games were played in Stevens Point, Wisconsin.

== Qualifying teams ==
The following teams qualified for the tournament. There were no automatic bids, however, conference tournament champions were given preferential consideration. No formal seeding was used while quarter and semifinal matches were arranged so that the road teams would have the shortest possible travel distances. Because the semifinal series were played at home team venues the NCAA elected to select an equal amount of eastern and western teams.

East						West					
School	Conference	Record	Berth Type	Appearance	Last Bid	School	Conference	Record	Berth Type	Appearance	Last Bid
Babson	ECAC East	18–3–4	At-Large	7th	1989	Gustavus Adolphus	MIAC	20–5–4	Tournament Champion	1st	Never
Elmira	ECAC West	23–7–1	Tournament Champion	3rd	1988	Mankato State	NCHA	14–13–6	At-Large	3rd	1986
Geneseo State	ECAC West	23–9–0	At-Large	1st	Never	St. Thomas	MIAC	19–7–0	At-Large	5th	1988
Plattsburgh State	ECAC West	20–8–1	At-Large	2nd	1988	Wisconsin–Stevens Point	NCHA	25–3–4	Tournament Champion	3rd	1989

== Format ==
The tournament featured three rounds of play. Starting in 1988, each round of the tournament consisted of a two-game series where the first team to reach 3 points was declared a winner (2 points for winning a game, 1 point each for tying). If both teams ended up with 2 points after the first two games a 20-minute mini-game used to determine a winner. Mini-game scores are in italics. The teams were seeded according to geographic proximity in the quarterfinals so the visiting team would have the shortest feasible distance to travel.

== Bracket ==
Quarterfinals; March 9–11
Elmira	5	2	0
Plattsburgh State	2	4	1
Babson	3	1	1
Geneseo State	3	1	0
Wisconsin–Stevens Point	4	3	-
St. Thomas	4	0	-
Mankato State	4	2	-
Gustavus Adolphus	1	2	-

Semifinals; March 16–17
Plattsburgh State	4	4	2
Babson	4	4	1
Wisconsin–Stevens Point	5	3	-
Mankato State	4	3	-

National Championship; March 23–24
Plattsburgh State	1	6	0
Wisconsin–Stevens Point	10	3	1

Note: * denotes overtime period(s)
Note: Mini-games in italics

== Record by conference ==
Conference	# of Bids	Record	Win %	Frozen Four	Championship Game	Champions
ECAC West	3	3–3–4	.500	1	1	-
NCHA	2	4–2–4	.600	2	1	1
MIAC	2	0–2–2	.250	-	-	-
ECAC East	1	0–0–4	.500	1	-	-
