= 1994 NCAA Division III men's ice hockey tournament =

- Teams: 8
- Finals site: Wessman Arena; Superior, Wisconsin
- Champions: Wisconsin–River Falls Falcons (2nd title)
- Runner-up: Wisconsin–Superior (1st title game)
- Semifinalists: Salem State Vikings (2nd Frozen Four); Fredonia State Blue Devils (1st Frozen Four)
- Winning coach: Dean Talafous (1st title)
- Attendance: 10,448

The 1994 NCAA Division III Men's Ice Hockey Tournament was the culmination of the 1993–94 season, the 11th such tournament in NCAA history. It concluded with Wisconsin-River Falls defeating Wisconsin-Superior in the championship game 6-4. All Quarterfinals matchups were held at home team venues, while all succeeding games were played in Superior, Wisconsin.

The NESCAC allowed its teams to play in national tournament for the first time. However, as part of the conference rule changes, such teams could only play in one postseason tournament. As a result, Williams, who won the ECAC East championship, elected not to play in their conference tournament in the hope that they would receive a bid to the NCAA tournament. Williams would ultimately not be chosen for the tournament.

== Qualifying teams ==
The following teams qualified for the tournament. There were no automatic bids, however, conference tournament champions were given preferential consideration. No formal seeding was used while quarterfinal matches were arranged so that the road teams would have the shortest possible travel distances.

East						West					
School	Conference	Record	Berth Type	Appearance	Last Bid	School	Conference	Record	Berth Type	Appearance	Last Bid
Elmira	ECAC West	21–5–1	At-Large	7th	1993	St. Thomas	MIAC	19–4–4	Tournament Champion	7th	1992
Fredonia State	SUNYAC	23–0–3	Tournament Champion	1st	Never	Wisconsin–River Falls	NCHA	17–8–4	At-Large	4th	1993
RIT	ECAC West	20–7–1	Tournament Champion	5th	1989	Wisconsin–Stevens Point	NCHA	17–7–3	At-Large	7th	1993
Salem State	ECAC East	22–4–2	Tournament Champion	5th	1993	Wisconsin–Superior	NCHA	21–5–3	Tournament Champion	3rd	1993

== Format ==
The tournament featured three rounds of play. In the Quarterfinals, teams played a two-game series where the first team to reach 3 points was declared a winner (2 points for winning a game, 1 point each for tying). If both teams ended up with 2 points after the first two games a 20-minute mini-game used to determine a winner. Mini-game scores are in italics. Beginning with the Semifinals all games became Single-game eliminations. The winning teams in the semifinals advanced to the National Championship Game with the losers playing in a Third Place game. The teams were seeded according to geographic proximity in the quarterfinals so the visiting team would have the shortest feasible distance to travel.

== Bracket ==
Quarterfinals; March 11–12
Fredonia State	3	7	-
RIT	3	0	-
Wisconsin–River Falls	4	4	-
Wisconsin–Stevens Point	2	3	-
Salem State	6	4	-
Elmira	4	4	-
Wisconsin–Superior	3	5	-
St. Thomas	3	1	-

Semifinals; March 18
Fredonia State	3
Wisconsin–River Falls	4
Salem State	2
Wisconsin–Superior	3*

National Championship; March 19
Wisconsin–River Falls	6
Wisconsin–Superior	4
Third Place Game
Fredonia State	7
Salem State	4

Note: * denotes overtime period(s)
Note: Mini-games in italics

== Record by conference ==
Conference	# of Bids	Record	Win %	Frozen Four	Championship Game	Champions
NCHA	3	6–3–1	.650	2	2	1
ECAC East	1	1–2–1	.375	1	-	-
ECAC West	2	0–2–2	.250	-	-	-
SUNYAC	1	2–1–1	.625	1	-	-
MIAC	1	0–1–1	.250	-	-	-
