= 2004 NCAA Division III men's ice hockey tournament =

Hockey tournament

- Teams: 9
- Finals site: Kreitzberg Arena, Northfield, Vermont
- Champions: Middlebury Panthers (6th title)
- Runner-up: St. Norbert Green Knights (1st title game)
- Semifinalists: Norwich Cadets (6th Frozen Four); Plattsburgh State Cardinals (9th Frozen Four)
- Winning coach: Bill Beaney (6th title)
- Attendance: 13,490

The 2004 NCAA Division III Men's Ice Hockey Tournament was the culmination of the 2003–04 season, the 21st such tournament in NCAA history. It concluded with Middlebury defeating St. Norbert in the championship game 1-0 in overtime. All First Round and Quarterfinal matchups were held at home team venues, while all succeeding games were played in Northfield, Vermont.

== Qualifying teams ==
The following teams qualified for the tournament. Automatic bids were offered to the conference tournament champion of seven different conferences with one at-large bid for the best remaining team from each region.

| East | | | | | | | West | | | | | | |
| Seed | School | Conference | Record | Berth Type | Appearance | Last Bid | Seed | School | Conference | Record | Berth Type | Appearance | Last Bid |
|---|---|---|---|---|---|---|---|---|---|---|---|---|---|
| 1 | Norwich | ECAC East | 23–3–0 | Tournament Champion | 7th | 2003 | 1 | St. Norbert | NCHA | 25–2–2 | Tournament Champion | 6th | 2003 |
| 2 | Middlebury | NESCAC | 24–3–0 | Tournament Champion | 10th | 2003 | 2 | Wisconsin–River Falls | NCHA | 20–5–4 | At–Large | 10th | 2003 |
| 3 | Plattsburgh State | SUNYAC | 22–4–3 | Tournament Champion | 12th | 2002 | 3 | St. Thomas | MIAC | 17–7–3 | Tournament Champion | 11th | 2002 |
| 4 | Curry | ECAC Northeast | 24–3–1 | At–Large | 1st | Never | | | | | | | |
| 5 | Wentworth | ECAC Northeast | 16–8–4 | Tournament Champion | 4th | 2003 | | | | | | | |
| 6 | Hobart | ECAC West | 15–7–5 | Tournament Champion | 1st | Never | | | | | | | |

== Format ==
The tournament featured four rounds of play. All rounds were Single-game elimination. For the three eastern Quarterfinals the teams were seeded according to their rankings with the top three teams serving as hosts. For the western quarterfinal, the top-ranked team awaited the winner of a play-in game between the lower-ranked teams.

== Tournament bracket ==
First Round; March 10
W2 | Wisconsin–River Falls | 3*
W3 | St. Thomas | 2

Quarterfinals; March 13
W1 | St. Norbert | 3
W2 | Wisconsin–River Falls | 0
E3 | Plattsburgh State | 5*
E4 | Curry | 4
E2 | Middlebury | 9
E5 | Wentworth | 1
E1 | Norwich | 9
E6 | Hobart | 5

Semifinals; March 19
W1 | St. Norbert | 4
E3 | Plattsburgh State | 1
E2 | Middlebury | 3**
E1 | Norwich | 2

National Championship; March 20
W1 | St. Norbert | 0
E2 | Middlebury | 1*

Note: * denotes overtime period(s)

== First round ==
=== (W2) Wisconsin–River Falls vs. (W3) St. Thomas ===
| March 10 | Wisconsin–River Falls | 3 – 2 | OT | St. Thomas | Hunt Arena |
| 10:20 – Aaron Degerness (9); 11:15 – Murphy Dwyer (2) | | First period | | Colin Greenlees (5) – pp – 18:33 |
| No scoring | | Second period | | No scoring |
| No scoring | | Third period | | Dustin Lick (24) – 16:17 |
| 15:12 – Jim Murphy (15) | | First overtime period | | No scoring |
| Andrew Scanlon (31 saves / 33 shots) | | Goalie stats | | Zach Sikich (35 saves / 38 shots) |

== Quarterfinals ==
=== (W1) St. Norbert vs. (W3) Wisconsin–River Falls ===
| March 13 | St. Norbert | 3 – 0 | Wisconsin–River Falls | Cornerstone Community Center |
| No scoring | | First period | No scoring |
| 14:35 – Spencer Carbery (19) | | Second period | No scoring |
| 03:27 – Connor Hughes (10); 18:44 – en – Faron Duthie (16) | | Third period | No scoring |
| Chancy Colquhoun (28 saves / 28 shots) | | Goalie stats | Andy Scanlon (28 saves / 30 shots) |

=== (E3) Plattsburgh State vs. (E4) Curry ===
| March 13 | Plattsburgh State | 5 – 4 | OT | Curry | Ronald B. Stafford Ice Arena |
| No scoring | | First period | | No scoring |
| 05:51 – Joe Carpinone (5); 18:17 – pp – Paul Kelly (13) | | Second period | | Chad Pillsbury (20) – pp – 14:02 |
| 12:33 – pp – Paul Kelly (14); 17:39 – Chad Kemp (13) | | Third period | | Brian Doherty (25) – 04:00; Sean Pero (13) – 06:42; Chester Ferreira (10) – 19:42 |
| 18:09 – Paul Kelly (15) | | First overtime period | | No scoring |
| Craig Neilson (30 saves / 34 shots) | | Goalie stats | | Lenny Mosca (37 saves / 42 shots) |

=== (E2) Middlebury vs. (E5) Wentworth ===
| March 13 | Middlebury | 9 – 1 | Wentworth | Chip Kenyon '85 Arena |
| 00:45 – Evgeny Saidachev (10); 14:59 – Darwin Hunt (7); 16:34 – Kevin Cooper (31) | | First period | No scoring |
| 13:17 – Adam Foote (14); 18:05 – Kevin Cooper (32); 18:34 – Patrick Nugent (12) | | Second period | No scoring |
| 02:02 – Brian Phinney (12); 12:17 – pp – Kevin Cooper (33); 14:36 – pp – Patrick Nugent (13) | | Third period | Blayne Goodman (9) – pp – 11:03 |
| Marc Scheuer (17 saves / 18 shots) | | Goalie stats | Raj Bhangoo (30 saves / 36 shots); Bryce McFadden (13 saves / 16 shots) |

=== (E1) Norwich vs. (E6) Hobart ===
| March 13 | Norwich | 9 – 5 | Hobart | Kreitzberg Arena |
| 01:36 – Andrew Senesi (2); 03:01 – Chris Fuss (1); 11:10 – pp – Paul Mattucci (15); 14:36 – Mario Chinelli (10) | | First period | Craig Levey (17) – pp – 16:02; Tyler Dufour (6) – pp – 16:56; Lee Carrier (6) – sh – 19:20 |
| No scoring | | Second period | Conor Bradley (3) – 14:19 |
| 03:56 – Kurtis McLean (33); 05:07 – pp – Lou DiMasi (6); 07:36 – Kurtis McLean (34); 12:50 – Kurtis McLean (35); 13:27 – Matt Schmidt (18) | | Third period | Adam Scott (2) – 03:28 |
| Mike Boudreau (27 saves / 32 shots) | | Goalie stats | Adam Lavelle (38 saves / 47 shots) |

== Semifinals ==
=== (W1) St. Norbert vs. (E3) Plattsburgh State ===
| March 19 | St. Norbert | 4 – 1 | Plattsburgh State | Kreitzberg Arena |
| No scoring | | First period | Justin Rafferty (2) – 18:19 |
| 12:18 – Jason Deitsch (19); 16:37 – pp – Connor Hughes (11) | | Second period | No scoring |
| 16:23 – Jon Schultz (5); 19:09 – en – Spencer Carbery (20) | | Third period | No scoring |
| Chancy Colquhoun (22 saves / 23 shots) | | Goalie stats | Craig Neilson (30 saves / 33 shots) |

=== (E1) Norwich vs. (E2) Middlebury ===
| March 19 | Norwich | 2 – 3 | 2OT | Middlebury | Kreitzberg Arena |
| 00:15 – Kurtis McLean (36); 11:22 – Andrew Senesi (3) | | First period | | No scoring |
| No scoring | | Second period | | John Sales (12) – 15:01 |
| No scoring | | Third period | | Kevin Cooper (34) – 14:13 |
| No scoring | | Second overtime period | | Levi Doria (8) – 07:17 |
| Kevin Schieve (44 saves / 47 shots) | | Goalie stats | | Marc Scheuer (44 saves / 46 shots) |

== National Championship ==
=== (W1) St. Norbert vs. (E2) Middlebury ===
| March 20 | St. Norbert | 0 – 1 | OT | Middlebury | Kreitzberg Arena |
| No scoring | | First period | | No scoring |
| No scoring | | Second period | | No scoring |
| No scoring | | Third period | | No scoring |
| No scoring | | First overtime period | | Kevin Cooper (35) – 02:58 |
| Chancy Colquhoun (32 saves / 33 shots) | | Goalie stats | | Marc Scheuer (29 saves / 29 shots) |

== Record by conference ==
| Conference | # of Bids | Record | Win % | Frozen Four | Championship Game | Champions |
|---|---|---|---|---|---|---|
| NCHA | 2 | 3–2 | .600 | 1 | 1 | - |
| MIAC | 2 | 0–2 | .000 | - | - | - |
| NESCAC | 1 | 3–0 | 1.000 | 1 | 1 | 1 |
| ECAC East | 1 | 1–1 | .500 | 1 | - | - |
| SUNYAC | 1 | 1–1 | .500 | 1 | - | - |
| ECAC West | 1 | 0–1 | .000 | - | - | - |
| ECAC Northeast | 1 | 0–1 | .000 | - | - | - |
