= List of NCAA Division III men's ice hockey seasons =

== Nebulous Beginning ==
In 1973 the NCAA changed its classification system to a numerical method. Schools were reclassified in three separate divisions with Division III being the lowest. The former College Division teams were mostly slotted into Division II despite a majority coming from D-III schools. Because the NCAA did not hold a national tournament for either D-II or D-III at the time there was no need to have a formal delineation between the two lower divisions, however, ECAC 3 had already been formed out of schools from ECAC 2 in order to allow them to participate in a more balanced conference. While there was no formal classification of ECAC 3 as a D-III conference until much later, the teams in ECAC 3 and the independents who later joined the conference are sometimes regarded as NCAA Division III programs during the first decade of play.

No.	Season	Tournament	Start	Finish
1	1973–74	None	November	March
2	1974–75	None	November	March
3	1975–76	None	November	March
4	1976–77	None	November	March
5	1977–78	None	November	March
6	1978–79	None	November	March
7	1979–80	None	November	March
8	1980–81	None	November	March
9	1981–82	None	November	March
10	1982–83	None	November	March

== Tournament Play Begins ==
In 1983 the NCAA announced they would hold an NCAA Division III Championship for the upcoming season. While most of the teams that were eligible for tournament continued to play at the Division II level, they submitted bids for the new championship at the end of the season. Due to the level of interest the tournament was founded as an 8-team championship with no automatic bids being offered. Prior to the tournament, because no conference championships were yet held for western teams, an 8-team qualifying tournament was held instead to determine which teams would receive bids to the national tournament. The regional tournament was discontinued after 1985 when the western conferences began their league playoffs.

Because the Division III level was skewed towards eastern teams, that region received more bids than the western teams for the first three years. Afterwards, both the eastern and western regions received 4 bids each.

No.	Season	Tournament	No. of teams in tournament	Start	Finish	NCAA Champion (number)	Champion Conference	Champion Record	Championship Site
11	1983–84	1984	8	November	March 18	Babson	ECAC 2	(27–5–1)	Rochester, New York
12	1984–85	1985	8	November	March 23	RIT	ECAC West	(26–6–1)	Schenectady, New York
13	1985–86	1986	8	November	March 22	Bemidji State	NCHA	(34–9–2)	Bemidji, Minnesota
14	1986–87	1987	8	November	March 21	Vacated (Note: Plattsburg State's participation in the 1987 tournament was later vacated due to recruiting violations. As a result there is no champion for 1987)	—	—	Elmira, New York
15	1987–88	1988	8	October	March 25	Wisconsin–River Falls	NCHA	(31–6–1)	Elmira, New York
16	1988–89	1989	8	October	March 25	Wisconsin–Stevens Point	NCHA	(34–5–2)	Rochester, New York
17	1989–90	1990	8	October	March 24	Wisconsin–Stevens Point (2)	NCHA	(28–4–6)	Stevens Point, Wisconsin
18	1990–91	1991	8	October	March 16	Wisconsin–Stevens Point (3)	NCHA	(27–9–0)	Elmira, New York
19	1991–92	1992	8	October	March 21	Plattsburgh State	ECAC West	(32–2–2)	Plattsburgh, New York
20	1992–93	1993	8	October	March 27	Wisconsin–Stevens Point (4)	NCHA	(25–5–2)	Maplewood, Minnesota

== Increased Participation ==
In 1994 the NESCAC, the primary conference for several eastern teams, announced that they were rescinding their policy barring member schools from participating in national tournaments. Their new policy, however, restricted members to only one postseason tournament. Because of that, some ECAC East schools had to decide whether or not they would participate in their conference tournament or sit out and hope that the selection committee would choose to offer them a bid. Williams was the first teams to take the gamble in 1994, but they did not receive a bid. The following year Middlebury sat out the ECAC East Tournament and received a bid. This began a five-year run for the Panthers as NCAA champions, the longest unbroken streak for a champion at any level of college hockey.

No.	Season	Tournament	No. of teams in tournament	Start	Finish	NCAA Champion (number)	Champion Conference	Champion Record	Championship Site
21	1993–94	1994	8	October	March 19	Wisconsin–River Falls (2)	NCHA	(21–8–4)	Superior, Wisconsin
22	1994–95	1995	8	October	March 25	Middlebury	ECAC East	(22–2–2)	Middlebury, Vermont
23	1995–96	1996	8	October	March 16	Middlebury (2)	ECAC East	(26–2–0)	River Falls, Wisconsin
24	1996–97	1997	8	October	March 22	Middlebury (3)	ECAC East	(22–3–2)	Middlebury, Vermont
25	1997–98	1998	8	October	March 21	Middlebury (4)	ECAC East	(24–2–2)	Plattsburgh, New York
26	1998–99	1999	8	October	March 20	Middlebury (5)	ECAC East	(21–5–1)	Norwich, Vermont

== Tournament Expansion and Exclusion ==
In 1999 the NCAA announced a plan to begin offering automatic bids for the Division III NCAA tournament. As part of this new policy, they would only offer bids to conference tournament champions of eligible Division III leagues. To qualify, none of the postseason participants could be ranked above Division III and the conference must have at least 7 members playing during the season. This caused several changes to college hockey, including the NESCAC sponsoring ice hockey as a sport for the first time and the termination of its policy restricting member teams to only one postseason tournament.

Due to five eastern conferences and two western conferences qualifying, the NCAA also abandoned its policy of having an equal number of eastern and western teams participate in the tournament. One at-large bid would be offered to the non-league champion with the best record but, after two years, the tournament was expanded to 9 teams with a second at-large bid included so that each region could provide an additional team. A further at-large bid was added in 2006 which could go to either region. The tournament was expanded to 11 teams in 2009 with an additional at-large bid which was converted into an automatic qualifier once the MCHA met NCAA regulations in 2010.

No.	Season	Tournament	No. of teams in tournament	Start	Finish	NCAA Champion (number)	Champion Conference	Champion Record	Championship Site
27	1999–00	2000	8	October 22	March 18	Norwich	ECAC East	(29–2–1)	Superior, Wisconsin
28	2000–01	2001	8	October 20	March 17	Plattsburgh State (2)	SUNYAC	(29–5–0)	Rochester, New York
29	2001–02	2002	9	October 19	March 16	Wisconsin–Superior	NCHA	(24–5–5)	Middlebury, Vermont
30	2002–03	2003	9	October 18	March 22	Norwich (2)	ECAC East	(27–3–0)	Norwich, Vermont
31	2003–04	2004	9	October 18	March 20	Middlebury (6)	NESCAC	(27–3–0)	Norwich, Vermont
32	2004–05	2005	9	October 15	March 19	Middlebury (7)	NESCAC	(23–4–3)	Middlebury, Vermont
33	2005–06	2006	10	October 15	March 19	Middlebury (8)	NESCAC	(26–2–2)	Elmira, New York
34	2006–07	2007	10	October 15	March 19	Oswego State	SUNYAC	(23–3–3)	Superior, Wisconsin
35	2007–08	2008	10	October 19	March 23	St. Norbert	NCHA	(27–1–4)	Lake Placid, New York
36	2008–09	2009	11	October 17	March 21	Neumann	ECAC West	(21–9–2)	Lake Placid, New York

== Conference realignment and dissolution ==
In 2009 the MASCAC began sponsoring ice hockey for the first time. The 5 member schools, along with 2 associate members, formed the league's new ice hockey division but despite meeting the NCAA's requirements for an automatic bid, the conference didn't receive one until 2012. The following year, 2013, the WIAC began sponsoring ice hockey for the first time. As a result, all 5 member schools that fielded teams left the NCHA. The NCHA responded by absorbing all members of the MCHA in order to retain its automatic qualifier. Due to the WIAC not having enough members the conference champion did not receive an automatic qualifier, bringing the number of at-large bids back to 4 since the MCHA no longer existed.

In 2017 the NCAA increased the number of tournament participants to 12 and offered the additional bid to one conference tournament champion whose league did not meet the minimum NCAA membership requirement. This bid was later given to the UCHC champion.

No.	Season	Tournament	No. of teams in tournament	Start	Finish	NCAA Champion (number)	Champion Conference	Champion Record	Championship Site
37	2009–10	2010	11 (Note: The MCHA received an automatic bid for the first time)	October 23	March 20	Norwich (3)	ECAC East	(26–1–4)	Lake Placid, New York
38	2010–11	2011	11	October 22	March 26	St. Norbert (2)	NCHA	(25–4–1)	Minneapolis, Minnesota
39	2011–12	2012	11	October 21	March 17	St. Norbert (3)	NCHA	(21–5–5)	Tampa, Florida
40	2012–13	2013	11	October 18	March 16	Wisconsin–Eau Claire	NCHA	(24–5–2)	Lake Placid, New York
41	2013–14	2014	11	October 26	March 22	St. Norbert (4)	NCHA	(28–3–1)	Lewiston, Maine
42	2014–15	2015	11	October 31	March 28	Trinity	NESCAC	(25–3–1)	Minneapolis, Minnesota
43	2015–16	2016	11	October 30	March 26	Wisconsin–Stevens Point (5)	WIAC	(24–5–2)	Lake Placid, New York
44	2016–17	2017	12	October 28	March 25	Norwich (4)	NEHC	(27–1–3)	Utica, New York
45	2017–18	2018	12	October 21	March 24	St. Norbert (5)	NCHC	(27–4–1)	Lake Placid, New York
46	2018–19	2019	12	October 13	March 23	Wisconsin–Stevens Point (6)	WIAC	(29–0–2)	Stevens Point, Wisconsin
47	2019–20	2020	12	November 1	March 8	Tournament cancelled due to COVID-19 pandemic			Buffalo, New York
48	2020–21	—	—	October 30	April 5	Tournament cancelled due to COVID-19 pandemic			

== Continued expansion and realignment ==
In the wake of COVID, Division III hockey saw many new programs while some also reappeared for the first time in many years. From 2021 to 2025, nine Division III schools founded ice hockey programs while three college restarted their dormant programs after at least 20 years away. However, due to financial difficulties that were exacerbated by the pandemic, three schools were forced to close permanently during the same time frame. With all of the changes occurring, conference realignment was almost unavoidable and two all-sport leagues began sponsoring ice hockey for the first time. The Little East Conference and Middle Atlantic Conferences siphoned member teams out of the NEHC and UCHC respectively. While the UCHC was able to get enough new teams to sign on and remain a viable league, the NEHC saw almost all of remaining members leave for other conferences, effectively signaling an end for one of Division III's oldest leagues.

At the same time, the NCAA's Division III Management Council made two small but significant changes to the selection process. First, the minimum number of member teams required for a conference to receive an automatic bid was lowered from seven to six. Two years later, the council also lowered the desired ratio of tournament bids to active programs from 1:6.5 to 1:6. For college hockey, this allowed the addition of new conferences as previously outlined but it also continued the D-III tournament's expansion.

No.	Season	Tournament	No. of teams in tournament	Start	Finish	NCAA Champion (number)	Champion Conference	Champion Record	Championship Site
49	2021–22	2022	12	October 16	March 26	Adrian	NCHA	(31–1–0)	Lake Placid, New York
50	2022–23	2023	12	October 19	March 25	Hobart	NEHC	(29–2–0)	Beverly, Massachusetts
51	2023–24	2024	13	October 27	March 23	Hobart (2)	NEHC	(28–2–1)	Hartford, Connecticut
52	2024–25	2025	14	November 1	March 30	Hobart (3)	NEHC	(29–1–1)	Utica, New York
53	2025–26	2026	14	October 31	March 29	Hamilton	NESCAC	(23–5–2)	Utica, New York

== Conference timeline ==
Note: MIAC had been operating a college hockey division since 1921 but did not participate as an official Division III league until 1984.
Note: NCHA Was founded as a Division II league in 1980.
Note: ECAC East and ECAC West both began the 1984–85 season as divisions within ECAC 2. During the season, the conference was split into two separate leagues.
Note: SUNYAC began an unofficial ice hockey conference in 1985 but did not formally support ice hockey as a sport until 1992.

== See also ==
- List of NCAA Division III men's ice hockey champions
