= NCAA Division III men's ice hockey tournament all-time team records =

This is a list of NCAA men's Division III ice hockey tournament all-time records, updated through the 2026 tournament.

School	Current Conference	Games	Wins	Losses	Ties	Winning pct.	Championships
Adrian	NCHA	22	11	11	0	.500	1
Amherst	NESCAC	8	3	5	0	.375	0
Anna Maria	NCHA	1	0	1	0	.000	0
Augsburg	MIAC	14	5	9	1	.367	0
Aurora	NCHA	5	3	2	0	.600	0
Babson	NEHC	36	14	16	6	.472	1
Bemidji State	N/A	20	11	9	0	.550	1
Bethel	MIAC	2	1	1	0	.500	0
Bowdoin	NESCAC	11	2	9	0	.182	0
Colby	NESCAC	5	2	3	0	.400	0
Concordia (MN)	MIAC	4	0	4	0	.000	0
Cortland State	SUNYAC	1	0	1	0	.000	0
Curry	CNE	9	3	6	0	.333	0
Elmira	UCHC	37	13	22	2	.378	0
Endicott	CNE	6	2	4	0	.333	0
Fitchburg State	MASCAC	2	0	2	0	.000	0
Fredonia State	SUNYAC	9	4	4	1	.500	0
Geneseo State	UCHC	21	10	9	2	.524	0
Gustavus Adolphus	MIAC	14	4	8	2	.357	0
Hamilton	NESCAC	8	6	2	0	.750	1
Hamline	MIAC	3	1	2	0	.333	0
Hobart	NEHC	28	17	11	0	.607	3
Lake Forest	NCHA	2	0	2	0	.000	0
Lebanon Valley	MAC	2	0	2	0	.000	0
Manhattanville	UCHC	7	2	5	0	.286	0
Mankato State	N/A	16	5	8	3	.406	0
Marian	NCHA	1	0	1	0	.000	0
Massachusetts Boston	NEHC	4	2	2	0	.500	0
Massachusetts Dartmouth	MASCAC	5	1	4	0	.200	0
Mercyhurst	N/A	1	0	1	0	.000	0
Middlebury	NESCAC	43	34	7	2	.814	8
MSOE	NCHA	1	0	1	0	.000	0
Neumann	MAC	6	4	2	0	.667	1
New England College	NEHC	6	1	4	1	.250	0
University of New England	CNE	11	5	6	0	.455	0
Nichols	CNE	5	1	4	0	.200	0
Norwich	NEHC	52	33	17	2	.654	4
Oswego State	SUNYAC	38	17	21	0	.447	1
Plattsburgh State	SUNYAC	53	22	23	8	.491	2
Plymouth State	MASCAC	7	1	6	0	.143	0
Potsdam State	SUNYAC	2	0	2	0	.000	0
RIT	N/A	41	22	15	4	.585	1
Saint John's	MIAC	12	2	9	1	.208	0
Saint Mary's	MIAC	4	0	4	0	.000	0
Salem State	MASCAC	19	6	12	1	.342	0
Salve Regina	NEHC	6	3	3	0	.500	0
St. Cloud State	N/A	4	2	2	0	.500	0
St. Norbert	NCHA	55	35	19	1	.645	5
St. Olaf	MIAC	3	0	3	0	.000	0
St. Scholastica	NCHA	1	0	1	0	.000	0
St. Thomas	N/A	32	9	19	4	.344	0
Stevenson	MAC	1	0	1	0	.000	0
Trine	NCHA	2	1	1	0	.500	0
Trinity	NESCAC	20	12	8	0	.600	1
Union	N/A	12	4	7	1	.375	0
Utica	UCHC	12	6	6	0	.500	0
Wentworth	CNE	9	1	8	0	.111	0
Williams	NESCAC	3	1	2	0	.333	0
Wisconsin–Eau Claire	WIAC	7	4	3	0	.571	1
Wisconsin–River Falls	WIAC	34	22	12	0	.647	2
Wisconsin–Stevens Point	WIAC	49	28	18	3	.602	6
Wisconsin–Stout	WIAC	6	3	3	0	.500	0
Wisconsin–Superior	WIAC	46	26	17	3	.605	1

† Plattsburgh's appearances from 1986 through 1988 were later vacated by the NCAA.
Teams in italics no longer play at the Division III level.

== Record by conference ==
As of 2026

Conference	Games	Wins	Losses	Ties	Winning pct.	Championships
CNE	31	14	17	0	.452	0
ECAC 2	16	8	6	2	.563	1
ECAC Northeast	22	2	20	0	.091	0
ECAC West	128	54	63	11	.465	3
Independent	3	0	3	0	.000	0
LEC	2	1	1	0	.500	0
MAC	2	0	2	0	.000	0
MASCAC	16	2	14	0	.125	0
MCHA	6	2	4	0	.333	0
MIAC	88	22	61	8	.286	0
NCHA	244	140	96	10	.589	15
NEHC	157	89	60	8	.592	13
NESCAC	72	42	28	2	.597	5
SUNYAC	97	41	49	7	.459	2
UCHC	16	8	10	0	.444	0
WIAC	23	14	9	0	.609	2

Defunct conferences in italics
