= 2025 NCAA Division III men's ice hockey tournament =

- Teams: 14
- Finals site: Adirondack Bank Center, Utica, New York
- Champions: Hobart (3rd title)
- Runner-up: Utica (1st title game)
- Semifinalists: Geneseo State (5th Frozen Four); Curry (1st Frozen Four)
- Winning coach: Mark Taylor (3rd title)
- MOP: Kahlil Fontana (Hobart)
- Attendance: 2,589 (Final)

The 2025 NCAA Division III men's ice hockey tournament was the culmination of the 2024–25 season, the 40th such tournament in NCAA history. Hobart successfully defended its championship for the third year in a row by defeating Utica 2–1 in overtime. In doing so, the Statesmen became the first program in almost 20 years to win three consecutive national championships, a feat that has only been accomplished five times prior (Michigan 1951–1953, Wisconsin–Stevens Point 1989–1991, Bemidji State 1993–1995 and Middlebury 1995–1999 & 2004–2006)

== Qualifying teams ==
=== Change ===
Following the 2023–24 athletic season, the Division III Management Council decided to change the tournament selection process for multiple sports. First, the ratio of bids to teams was lowered from 1:6.5 to 1:6, which would give the men's bracket an additional bid. Additionally, the council merged pools B and C for selection of at-large bids. Since there were no active conferences that had less than the requisite six members for an automatic bid (Pool B) that change did not affect men's college hockey. Finally, the selection committee would be using the NCAA Power Index instead of PairWise Rankings for choosing the at-large bids.

=== Teams ===
The tournament featured 14 teams selected in the following manner: (Pool A) ten teams received bids as a result of being conference tournament champions from conferences that possessed an automatic bid, (Pool B) four additional teams received at-large bids based upon their NCAA Percentage Index.

East							West						
Seed	School	Conference	Record	Berth Type	Appearance	Last Bid	Seed	School	Conference	Record	Berth Type	Appearance	Last Bid
1	Curry (1)	CNE	24–3–0	Tournament Champion	7th	2024	1	Aurora (3)	NCHA	23–4–1	At-Large	1st	Never
2	Hobart (2)	NEHC	26–1–1	Tournament Champion	14th	2024	2	St. Norbert (5)	NCHA	23–5–1	Tournament Champion	22nd	2024
3	Utica (4)	UCHC	21–4–2	At-Large	6th	2024	3	Trine (7)	NCHA	20–6–2	At-Large	1st	Never
4	Geneseo State (6)	UCHC	22–4–1	Tournament Champion	11th	2024	4	Gustavus Adolphus	MIAC	16–9–2	Tournament Champion	7th	2012
5	University of New England (8)	CNE	18–7–1	At-Large	5th	2023	5	Wisconsin–Eau Claire	WIAC	14–15–1	Tournament Champion	4th	2020
6	Hamilton	NESCAC	20–6–1	Tournament Champion	2nd	2017							
7	Oswego State	SUNYAC	16–8–3	Tournament Champion	17th	2019							
8	Stevenson	MAC	18–7–2	Tournament Champion	1st	Never							
9	Fitchburg State	MASCAC	15–12–1	Tournament Champion	2nd	2018							

== Format ==
The tournament featured four rounds of play. All rounds were single-game elimination. Because there were five western bids, those teams could not be localized in a single quarterfinal bracket. This meant that some matches would have to be arranged based upon proximity rather than ranking.

First, the top two overall seeds (Curry and Hobart) received byes into the quarterfinal round while the remaining teams were seeded in the first round. The top 4 overall seeds were placed in separate brackets and arranged so that, were they to advance, the #1 seed would play the #4 seed. Before any other seeding was done, the easter-most qualifier from the west (Trine) was placed into the same first round match as the western-most lower-seeded team from the east (Oswego State). While both Hobart and Geneseo State were further west, those two teams were to serve as hosts for playoff games while Oswego would be playing on the road. In order to cut down on travel, the winner of that east-west match would automatically advance to play Hobart, a relatively short distance from Trine's campus.

The remaining teams were seeded according to their regions with the top-ranked remaining western team facing the lowest-ranked remaining western team. However, instead of placing the four remaining western teams in the same bracket (which had been standard policy in tournaments past), they were split into two brackets so that the first round matches containing the second western seed and second eastern seeds in the first round would play the first seeds of the opposite region in the quarterfinal round. This was done in part to not disadvantage the two teams in the east-west first round match by requiring the winner to travel far more than any other team but also because the second western seed (St. Norbert) was the 5th-overall seed while the second eastern seed in the first round (Geneseo State) was the 6th-overall seed and placing them in the same brackets as the 4th- and 3rd-overall seeds respectively made for a more fair arrangement.

The higher-seeded team played host in all first round and quarterfinal matches. As one of the participating teams, Utica was selected to host the Frozen Four at their home rink, the Utica Memorial Auditorium.

== Bracket ==
First round March 15
E5	University of New England (8)	2
E6	Hamilton	4
E3	Utica (4)	5
E9	Fitchburg State	1
W2	St. Norbert (5)	3
W4	Gustavus Adolphus	2
W3	Trine (7)	4
E7	Oswego State	1
W1	Aurora (3)	3
W5	Wisconsin–Eau Claire	2
E4	Geneseo State (6)	3
E8	Stevenson	1

Quarterfinals; March 20
E1	Curry (1)	4
E6	Hamilton	1
E3	Utica (4)	5
W2	St. Norbert (5)	3
E2	Hobart (2)	3*
W3	Trine (7)	2
W1	Aurora (3)	4
E4	Geneseo State (6)	7

Semifinals; March 28
E1	Curry (1)	1
E3	Utica (4)	2*
E2	Hobart (2)	2
E4	Geneseo State (6)	1

National Championship; March 30
E3	Utica (4)	1
E2	Hobart (2)	2*

Note: * denotes overtime period(s)

== Results ==
=== First round ===
March 15, 2025; 7:00 PM	(E5) University of New England	2 – 4 (1–2, 0–1, 1–1)	(E6) Hamilton	Harold Alfond Forum – Biddeford, Maine; Attendance: 645

Game reference

Joey Stanizzi
Goalies
Charlie Archer
Referees:
Michael Roberts
Chris Henry
Linesmen:
Adam Drexel
Josh Berenson

Ryan Kuzmich (21) – 07:13	1–0
	1–1	17:26 – Devon de Vries (8) (Krock)
	1–2	19:30 – Ryan Sordillo (5) (Zimmerman, Constantine)
	1–3	34:15 – Justin Biraben (5) (Brown)
(Bergeman, Marino) Jayden Price (6) – PP – 43:19	2–3
	2–4	59:03 – EN – Jackson Krock (15) (Zimmerman)

2 min
Penalties
6 min
23
Shots
23

March 15, 2025; 1:00 PM	(E3) Utica	5 – 1 (2–0, 1–0, 2–1)	(E9) Fitchburg State	Adirondack Bank Center – Utica, New York; Attendance: 3,194

Game reference

Ryan Piros
Goalies
Max Macchioni
Referees:
Daniel Gosselin
Aaron Townsend
Linesmen:
Ryan Boylan
Mason Hoeffner

(Della Rovere, Brighton) Matt Wood (8) – 06:10	1–0
(Mulera) Matt Wood (9) – 08:56	2–0
(Schultheis, Murphy) Aiden Hughes (4) – 38:20	3–0
Eric Vitale (10) – 51:45	4–0
	4–1	55:17 – Hunter Dunn (13) (Orme-Lynch)
(D'Addario, Scoville) Gabriel Lundberg (5) – 58:57	5–1

2 min
Penalties
4 min
43
Shots
18

March 15, 2025; 7:00 PM	(E5) St. Norbert	3 – 2 (1–0, 1–0, 1–2)	(E8) Gustavus Adolphus	Cornerstone Community Center – Ashwaubenon, Wisconsin; Attendance: 1,262

Game reference

Hunter Garvey
Goalies
Colin Androlewicz
Referees:
Eric Smevoll
Shaun Houser
Linesmen:
Steve Gurchinoff
Dustin Kliztke

(Deics, Fraser) Logan Dombrowsky (17) – 10:11	1–0
	1–1	40:34 – SH – Wilmer Svensson (9) (Holt)
(Hammond, Byrne) Jack Christen (4) – 34:01	2–1
(Hammond) Bryan Gilman (3) – EN – 58:25	3–1
	3–2	59:26 – EA – Hunter Newhouse (13) (Svensson)

7 min
Penalties
12 min
29
Shots
23

March 15, 2025; 7:00 PM	(W3) Trine	4 – 1 (0–0, 2–0, 2–1)	(E7) Oswego State	Thunder Ice Arena – Angola, Indiana; Attendance: 754

Game reference

Ronnie Petrucci
Goalies
Brandon Milberg
Referees:
William Jones
Craig Florkowski
Linesmen:
Caid Blessing
Brett Straley

(Vassallo, Cohen) Drew Jeffers (2) – 34:52	1–0
(Wright) Brendan Finn (7) – 36:57	2–0
(Antenucci, Babich) Sean Henry (9) – 40:34	3–0
	3–1	53:42 – PP – Jesse Horacek (10) (Vassallo, Cohen)
(Hill) Tyler Fox (4) – EN – 59:50	4–1

6 min
Penalties
6 min
18
Shots
27

March 15, 2025; 2:00 PM	(W1) Aurora	3 – 2 (1–0, 0–0, 2–2)	(W5) Wisconsin–Eau Claire	Fox Valley Ice Arena – Geneva, Illinois; Attendance: 412

Game reference

Jacob Mucitelli
Goalies
Max Gutjahr
Referees:
Shane Dillon
Brandon Schroder
Linesmen:
Joe Guzzardi
Nick Schirripa

(Schmuck, Brockman) Jakson Kirk (12) – PP – 15:51	1–0
Keaton Lipsett (2) – 42:58	2–0
	2–1	45:15 – Leo Bacallao (9) (Heyde, Herzberg)
Juliano Santalucia (9) – EN – 59:20	3–1
	3–2	59:43 – EA – Jadon Reimer (1)

2 min
Penalties
2 min
37
Shots
26

=== Quarterfinals ===
March 20, 2025; 3:00 PM	(E1) Curry	4 – 1 (0–0, 2–0, 2–1)	(E6) Hamilton	Canton Ice House – Canton, Massachusetts; Attendance: 1,000

Game reference

Shane Soderwall
Goalies
Charlie Archer

Taurin Haddon-Harris (5) – 22:29	1–0
(Soderling) Nolan McDonough (11) – 26:48	2–0
	2–1	41:12 – Luke Tchor (17) (Zimmerman, Philpott)
(Vonakis) Taurin Haddon-Harris (6) – 53:02	3–1
Grady Friedman (11) – EN – 56:49	4–1

12 min
Penalties
12 min
36
Shots
38

March 20, 2025; 1:00 PM	(W2) St. Norbert	3 – 5 (1–1, 2–1, 0–3)	(E3) Utica	Adirondack Bank Center – Utica, New York; Attendance: 3,015

Game reference

Hunter Garvey
Goalies
Ryan Piros
Referees:
Anthony Perez
Sam Cucinotta
Linesmen:
Chris Foote
Shane Dillon

Brock Baker (7) – 03:15	1–0
	1–1	19:08 – Jakob Breault (16) (Mulera, Scoville)
(Baker, Hammond) Calvin Hanson (7) – 23:19	2–1
(Dombrowsky, Fraser) Carter Hottmann (12) – 25:13	3–1
	3–2	26:15 – Drake Morse (13) (Breault)
	3–3	38:05 – Jakob Breault (17)
	3–4	39:45 – Gabriel Lundberg (6) (Gullichsen, D'Addario)
	3–5	59:59 – EN – Aiden Hughes (5) (Breault, Schultheis)

0 min
Penalties
0 min
27
Shots
38

March 20, 2025; 7:00 PM	(E2) Hobart	3 – 2 (OT) (0–0, 0–2, 2–0, 1–0)	(W3) Trine	Geneva Recreation Complex – Geneva, New York; Attendance: 614

Game reference

Damon Beaver
Goalies
Ronnie Petrucci
Referees:
Jason Swenson
Tyler Loftus
Linesmen:
Donovan Ott
Vincent Stefan

	0–1	23:44 – PP – Logan Furstenau (12) (Wright, Cooper)
	0–2	30:54 – Sam Antenucci (10) (Jeffers)
(Daniels, Swift) Luke Aquaro (15) – PP – 40:27	1–2
(Daniels, Swift) Dominic Schimizzi (10) – 43:27	2–2
Luke Aquaro (16) – 69:15	3–2

4 min
Penalties
10 min
41
Shots
25

March 20, 2025; 8:00 PM	(W2) Geneseo State	7 – 4 (0–1, 2–2, 5–1)	(E3) Aurora	Fox Valley Ice Arena – Geneva, Illinois; Attendance: 1,377

Game reference

Adam Harris
Goalies
Jacob Mucitelli
Referees:
Bill Jones
Matthew Wyld
Linesmen:
Caid Blessing
Brett Staley

	0–1	18:47 – Chase Broda (7) (Dekowny)
	0–2	20:30 – Juliano Santalucia (10) (Kirk, Schmidt)
	0–3	26:17 – Landry Schmuck (31) (Bédard, Schmidt)
(Wiberg, Morgan) Alex Dameski (14) – 26:42	1–3
(Fensterstock) Luke Panchisin (10) – 37:56	2–3
	2–4	44:08 – Andrew Schultz (3) (Hay)
(Beaulne) Luke Panchisin (11) – 44:51	3–4
(Howard, Gatewood) Jack McDonald (6) – 39:43	4–4
(McDonald, Zarudny) Alex Dameski (15) – 55:56	5–4
Filip Wiberg (16) – EN – 58:12	6–4
(Morgan, Melso) Filip Wiberg (17) – EN – 59:04	7–4

2 min
Penalties
18 min
35
Shots
30

=== Semifinals ===
March 28, 2025; 7:00 PM	(E1) Curry	1 – 2 (OT) (0–0, 0–1, 1–0, 0–1)	(E3) Utica	Utica University Nexus Center – Utica, New York; Attendance: 2,179

Game reference

Shane Soderwall
Goalies
Ryan Piros
Referees:
Matt Wyld
Chris Henry
Linesmen:
Ryan Chauie
Mark McGinnis

	0–1	38:37 – Anthony Bax (2) (Scoville, Breault)
(Dill, Prewitt) Shane Carr (3) – PP – 51:03	1–1
	1–2	64:25 – Eric Vitale (11) (Scoville)

4 min
Penalties
2 min
20
Shots
36

March 28, 2025; 3:00 PM	(E2) Hobart	2 – 1 (0–0, 1–0, 1–1)	(E4) Geneseo State	Utica University Nexus Center – Utica, New York; Attendance: 1,600

Game reference

Damon Beaver
Goalies
Adam Harris
Referees:
Craig Florkowski
Trevor Waite
Linesmen:
Sam Cucinotta
Anthony Perez

(Fontana) Calum Chau (2) – 25:39	1–0
	1–1	42:16 – Peter Morgan (15)
(Mourar) Matthew Iasenza (4) – 50:36	2–1

2 min
Penalties
4 min
40
Shots
21

=== National Championship ===
March 30, 2025; 7:00 PM	(E2) Hobart	2 – 1 (OT) (0–0, 0–1, 1–0, 1–0)	(E3) Utica	Utica University Nexus Center – Utica, New York; Attendance: 2,586

Game reference

Damon Beaver
Goalies
Ryan Piros
Referees:
Matt Wyld
Trevor Waite
Linesmen:
Ryan Chauvin
Mark McGinnis

	0–1	29:39 – Eric Vitale (12) (Della Rovere, Wood)
(Morrissey, Aquaro) Easton Ryan (5) – 48:35	1–1
Kahlil Fontana (10) – 78:22	2–1

2 min
Penalties
2 min
46
Shots
40

== All-Tournament Team ==
- G: Ryan Piros (Utica)
- G: Damon Beaver (Hobart)
- D: Calum Chau (Hobart)
- D: Brian Scoville (Utica)
- F: Eric Vitale (Utica)
- F: Easton Ryan (Hobart)
- F: Kahlil Fontana* (Hobart)

== Record by conference ==
Conference	# of Bids	Record	Win %	Quarterfinals	Frozen Four	Championship Game	Champions
NEHC	1	3–0	1.000	1	1	1	1
UCHC	2	5–2	.714	2	2	1	—
CNE	2	1–2	.333	1	1	—	—
NCHA	3	3–3	.500	3	—	—	—
NESCAC	1	1–1	.500	1	—	—	—
MAC	1	0–1	.000	—	—	—	—
MASCAC	1	0–1	.000	—	—	—	—
MIAC	1	0–1	.000	—	—	—	—
SUNYAC	1	0–1	.000	—	—	—	—
WIAC	1	0–1	.000	—	—	—	—

== See also ==
- 2025 NCAA Division I men's ice hockey tournament
