= 2026 NCAA Division III men's ice hockey tournament =

- Teams: 14
- Finals site: Adirondack Bank Center, Utica, New York
- Champions: Hamilton (1st title)
- Runner-up: Hobart (4th title game)
- Semifinalists: Wisconsin–Stout (2nd Frozen Four); Aurora (1st Frozen Four)
- Winning coach: Rob Haberbusch (1st title)
- MOP: Aksel Reid (Hamilton)
- Attendance: 3,837 (Final)

The 2026 NCAA Division III men's ice hockey tournament is the culmination of the 2025–26 season, the 41st such tournament in NCAA history. Hamilton defeated previously undefeated Hobart 2–1 in overtime to win the program's first national championship.

== Qualifying teams ==
The tournament featured 14 teams selected in the following manner: (Pool A) ten teams received bids as a result of being conference tournament champions from conferences that possessed an automatic bid, (Pool B) four additional teams received at-large bids based upon their NCAA Percentage Index.

East							West						
Seed	School	Conference	Record	Berth Type	Appearance	Last Bid	Seed	School	Conference	Record	Berth Type	Appearance	Last Bid
1	Hobart	SUNYAC	28–0–0	Tournament Champion	15th	2025	1	Wisconsin–Stout	WIAC	21–5–1	Tournament Champion	3rd	2009
2	Endicott	CNE	21–3–3	Tournament Champion	4th	2024	2	Aurora	NCHA	23–5–1	At-Large	2nd	2025
3	Hamilton	NESCAC	19–5–2	At-Large	3rd	2025	3	St. Norbert	NCHA	21–6–2	Tournament Champion	23rd	2025
4	Utica	UCHC	19–7–1	Tournament Champion	7th	2025	4	Saint John's	MIAC	17–6–4	Tournament Champion	7th	2013
5	Salve Regina	Independent	17–3–0	At-Large	3rd	2018							
6	University of New England	CNE	21–6–0	At-Large	6th	2025							
7	Norwich	LEC	18–5–4	Tournament Champion	21st	2023							
8	Anna Maria	MASCAC	20–5–2	Tournament Champion	1st	Never							
9	Williams	NESCAC	12–13–2	Tournament Champion	2nd	2016							
10	Neumann	MAC	17–8–2	Tournament Champion	3rd	2011							

== Format ==
The tournament featured four rounds of play. All rounds were single-game elimination. Except for flipping the seeding of Norwich and St. John's in order to save a flight, the NCAA seeded using the NCAA Percentage Index (NPI). The top two overall teams (Hobart and Endicott) received byes into the quarterfinal round while the remaining teams were seeded in the first round.

The higher-seeded teams played host in all first round and quarterfinal matches. Prior to the start of the tournament, Utica was selected to host the Frozen Four at their home rink, the Utica Memorial Auditorium.

== Bracket ==
First round March 14
W3	St. Norbert (8)	5
E6	University of New England (9)	4
W1	Wisconsin–Stout (5)	4
E8	Anna Maria (12)	1
E4	Utica (4)	3
E9	Williams (13)	0
W2	Aurora (7)	6
W4	Saint John's (10)	1
E5	Salve Regina (6)	1
E7	Norwich (11)	6
E3	Hamilton (3)	6
E10	Neumann (14)	2

Quarterfinals; March 21
E1	Hobart (1)	2
W3	St. Norbert (8)	1
W1	Wisconsin–Stout (5)	5
E4	Utica (4)	1
E2	Endicott (2)	2
W2	Aurora (7)	3**
E7	Norwich (11)	1
E3	Hamilton (3)	2*

Semifinals; March 27
E1	Hobart (1)	4
W1	Wisconsin–Stout (5)	2
W2	Aurora (7)	3
E3	Hamilton (3)	6

National Championship; March 29
E1	Hobart (1)	1
E3	Hamilton (3)	2*

Note: * denotes overtime period(s)

== Results ==
Note: All times local

=== First round ===
March 14, 2026; 7:00 PM	(E3) Hamilton	6 – 2 (0–1, 2–1, 4–0)	(E10) Neumann	Russell Sage Rink – Clinton, New York; Attendance: 379

Aksel Reid	Goalies	Christian Green	Referees: Craig Florkowski; Charlie Van Kula; Linesmen: Vince Stefan; Matt Potrzeba
(de Vries, Biraben) Ryan Sordillo (7) – 31:25 (Sordillo, Wojciechowski) Luke Tchor (16) – PP – 32:19 (Danis, Gould) Max Bulawka (10) – 45:26 (Sordillo, Wojciechowski) Max Bulawka (11) – PP – 45:43 (Danis, Wojciechowski) Connor Thue (2) – 47:46 (Constantine) Curtiss Sturgeon (1) – EN – 56:25 / Goals / 08:11 – Jared Coccimiglio (11) (Tishkevich); 33:02 – Jared Coccimiglio (12) (Patterson, Kennedy)			Referees: Craig Florkowski; Charlie Van Kula; Linesmen: Vince Stefan; Matt Potrzeba
4 min	Penalties	8 min	Referees: Craig Florkowski; Charlie Van Kula; Linesmen: Vince Stefan; Matt Potrzeba
32	Shots	19	Referees: Craig Florkowski; Charlie Van Kula; Linesmen: Vince Stefan; Matt Potrzeba

March 14, 2026; 7:00 PM	(E4) Utica	3 – 0 (0–0, 3–0, 0–0)	(E9) Williams	Adirondack Bank Center – Utica, New York; Attendance: 4,014

Kyle Curtin
Goalies
Harrison Fogel
Referees:
Daniel Gosselin
Christopher Foote
Linesmen:
Anthony Perez
Aaron Jones

(Gullichsen) Aidan Hughes (6) – 33:58	1–0
(Morse, Goukler) Andrew Della Rovere (12) – 34:28	2–0
(Hughes, Ahern) John Gutt (14) – PP – 37:01	3–0

6 min
Penalties
4 min
26
Shots
28

March 14, 2026; 7:00 PM	(W1) Wisconsin–Stout	4 – 1 (2–0, 1–1, 1–0)	(E8) Anna Maria	Fanetti Community Center – Menomonie, Wisconsin; Attendance: 739

Sebastian Monaco
Goalies
Matthew Hennessey
Referees:
Jared Waitt
Anthony Lancette
Linesmen:
Brenden Boche
Bryce Wold

(Sidarovich) Gunner Moore (1) – 11:11	1–0
(Stocks, Pigeon) Tristan Therrien (11) – 17:10	2–0
(Sinclair) Hayden Stocks (15) – 21:30	3–0
	3–1	27:18 – Lucas De La Salle (9) (Wells)
(Moore) Kullan Daikawa (8) – EN – 59:13	4–1

6 min
Penalties
2 min
34
Shots
22

March 14, 2026; 7:00 PM	(E5) Salve Regina	1 – 6 (0–3, 0–1, 1–2)	(E7) Norwich	Howard Rink – Newport, Rhode Island; Attendance: 600

Selby Warren
Goalies
Sami Molu
Referees:
Andrew O'Brien
Alex Wald
Linesmen:
Benjamin Gosselin
Brett Bohl

	0–1	04:29 – Frank D'ancona (8) (Elliott, Thibodeau)
	0–2	04:48 – Jed Brazo (5) (Stahlbaum)
	0–3	16:15 – Nicholas Cordeiro (9)
	0–4	39:03 – Zach Ophoven (15) (Cordeiro, Thibodeau)
	0–5	40:25 – 40:25 – Ben Van Waterschoot (9) (Cordeiro, Ophoven)
	0–6	40:46 – PP – Boyd Stahlbaum (11) (D'ancona)
(Connolly, Coupe) Jack Arizo (12) – PP – 46:51	1–6

20 min
Penalties
17 min
34
Shots
35

March 14, 2026; 2:00 PM	(W2) Aurora	6 – 1 (1–0, 1–1, 4–0)	(W4) Saint John's	Fox Valley Ice Arena – Aurora, Illinois; Attendance: 1,031

Matthew O'Donnell
Goalies
Jon Howe
Thomas Kuriscak
Referees:
Dan Dineen
Caid Blessing
Linesmen:
Travis Anilberg
Dustin Klitzke

(Hay, Kondor) Jakson Kirk (22) – 19:47	1–0
	1–1	26:02 – PP – Jordan Newpower (8) (Krenke, Borst)
(Brockman, Broda) Andrew Schultz (2) – 27:37	2–1
(Evjen, Schultz) Conor Ronayne (11) – 49:07	3–1
Jacob Brockman (8) – 49:21	4–1
Lukas Sedlacek (18) – 49:53	5–1
Jake Code (8) – PP – EN – 57:04	6–1

6 min
Penalties
10 min
33
Shots
37

March 14, 2026; 7:00 PM	(W3) St. Norbert	5 – 4 (2–3, 1–0, 2–1)	(E6) University of New England	Cornerstone Community Center – Ashwaubenon, Wisconsin; Attendance: 1,193

Hunter Garvey
Goalies
Harrison Chesney
Referees:
Matt Fuller
Seth Mukai
Linesmen:
Steve Gurchinoff
Brett Straley

(Morris) Calvin Hanson (17) – 00:56	1–0
	1–1	02:57 – Ryan Hadland (10) (Powers)
(Christen) Logan Dombrowsky (14) – PP – 07:22	2–1
	2–2	06:24 – Nick Marino (4) (Bergeman)
	2–3	15:42 – Dom Murphy (11) (Olivieri)
(Byrne, Koufis) Blake Ulve (9) – PP – 34:16	3–3
Braydon Beahm (16) – 55:56	4–3
	4–4	59:30 – EA – Nathan Chickering (14) (Murphy)
(Hammond) John Christen (6) – 59:48	5–4

2 min
Penalties
12 min
24
Shots
32

=== Quarterfinals ===
March 21, 2026; 7:00 PM	(E1) Hobart	2 – 1 (0–0, 2–0, 0–1)	(W3) St. Norbert	Geneva Recreation Center – Geneva, New York; Attendance: 486

Damon Beaver
Goalies
Hunter Garvey
Referees:
Joseph Baudo
William Jones
Linesmen:
Anthony Perez
Vincent Stefan

(Chau) Tanner Daniels (16) – 21:58	1–0
(Morrissey, Daniels) Conor Lally (13) – 28:35	2–0
	2–1	56:45 – Braydon Beahm (17) (Hanson, Byrne)

6 min
Penalties
2 min
30
Shots
23

March 21, 2026; 7:00 PM	(E2) Endicott	2 – 3 (2OT) (1–1, 1–0, 0–1, 0–0, 0–1)	(W2) Aurora	Raymond J. Bourque Arena – Beverly, Massachusetts; Attendance: 1,000

Peter Sterling
Goalies
Matthew O'Donnell
Referees:
Chris Henry
Dan Dineen
Linesmen:
Zac Benedetto
Adam Drexel

	0–1	03:33 – Jakson Kirk (23) (Schmidt)
Jack Costanzo (7) – 05:13	1–1
(Self, Autere) Michael Casey (8) – PP – 24:20	2–1
	2–2	48:13 – Jaden Davis (13) (Akl, Many Grey Horses)
	2–3	85:12 – Andrew Schultz (3) (Sedlacek, Kirk)

6 min
Penalties
6 min
58
Shots
50

March 21, 2026; 7:00 PM	(E3) Hamilton	2 – 1 (OT) (0–0, 1–0, 0–1, 1–0)	(E7) Norwich	Russell Sage Rink – Clinton, New York; Attendance: 397

Aksel Reid
Goalies
Sami Molu
Referees:
Chris Pike
Ron Morello
Linesmen:
Rich Jebo
Jacob Zaremski

(Zimmerman, Sturgeon) Max Bulawka (12) – 25:50	1–0
	1–1	49:49 – Boyd Stahlbaum (12)
(Tchor) Jackson Krock (8) – 62:44	2–1

4 min
Penalties
6 min
43
Shots
22

March 21, 2026; 7:00 PM	(E4) Utica	1 – 5 (1–1, 0–2, 0–2)	(W1) Wisconsin–Stout	Adirondack Bank Center – Utica, New York; Attendance: 3,591

Kyle Curtin
Goalies
Sebastian Monaco
Referees:
Trevor Waite
Clayton Smith
Linesmen:
Matthew Potrzeba
Aaron Jones

(Cerrato, Morse) Alex German (2) – PP – 14:03	1–0
	1–1	15:51 – Hayden Stocks (16) (Pigeon)
	1–2	22:19 – PP – Hayden Stocks (17) (Tyrrell, Sidorovich)
	1–3	36:33 – Nicolas Pigeon (11) (Daikawa, Stocks)
	1–4	56:05 – EN – Nicholas Stevens (9) (Sidorovich)
	1–5	56:22 – Evan Luxford (4)

6 min
Penalties
8 min
47
Shots
22

=== Semifinals ===
March 27, 2026; 7:00 PM	(E1) Hobart	4 – 2 (1–1, 1–0, 2–1)	(W1) Wisconsin–Stout	Adirondack Bank Center – Utica, New York; Attendance: 872

Damon Beaver
Goalies
Sebastian Monaco
Referees:
Craig Florkowski
Anthony Lancette
Linesmen:
Anthony Perez
Aaron Jones

(Hovsepyan, Fontana) Conor Lally (14) – 02:54	1–0
	1–1	18:17 – Nicolas Pigeon (12) (Stocks)
(Hovsepyan, Elliott) Tamás Tóth (7) – 33:12	2–1
(Chau, Ondris) Christopher Duclair (13) – 48:13	3–1
	3–2	54:41 – PP – Arkhip Sidorovich (11) (Tyrrell, Stocks)
Ignat Belov (5) – EN – 58:49	4–2

17 min
Penalties
10 min
40
Shots
21

March 27, 2026; 3:00 PM	(E3) Hamilton	6 – 3 (2–0, 2–1, 2–2)	(W2) Aurora	Adirondack Bank Center – Utica, New York; Attendance: 943

Aksel Reid
Goalies
Matthew O'Donnell
Referees:
Daniel Gosselin
William Jones
Linesmen:
Matthew Potrzeba
Vincent Stefan

(Wojciechowski, Bulawka) Luke Tchor (17) – PP – 05:03	1–0
(Gallary, Danis) Noah Leibl (10) – 14:17	2–0
	2–1	24:04 – Lukas Sedlacek (19) (Kirk, Schmidt)
(Wojciechowski) Justin Biraben (9) – 33:05	3–1
(Bulawka, de Vries) Ben Zimmerman (4) – 35:41	4–1
	4–2	46:54 – Jakson Kirk (24) (Lipsett, Schmidt)
	4–3	47:48 – Landry Schmuck (11) (Truman, Hay)
(Gallary, Krock) Justin Biraben (10) – PP – EN – 58:25	5–3
(Biraben) Noah Leibl (11) – EN – 59:57	6–3

2 min
Penalties
4 min
31
Shots
38

=== National Championship ===
March 29, 2026; 3:00 PM	(E1) Hobart	1 – 2 (OT) (1–0, 0–1, 0–0, 0–1)	(E3) Hamilton	Adirondack Bank Center – Utica, New York; Attendance: 3,837

Damon Beaver
Goalies
Aksel Reid
Referees:
Craig Florkowski
Dan Gosselin
Linesmen:
Aaron Jones
Anthony Perez

(Lally, Morrissey) Kahlil Fontana (21) – PP – 08:39	1–0
	1–1	20:15 – Luke Tchor (18) (Leibl)
	1–2	76:44 – Curtiss Sturgeon (2) (Tchor, Walsh)

2 min
Penalties
2 min
40
Shots
25

== All-Tournament Team ==
TBA

== Record by conference ==
Conference	# of Bids	Record	Win %	Quarterfinals	Frozen Four	Championship Game	Champions
NESCAC	2	4–1	.800	1	1	1	1
SUNYAC	1	2–1	.667	1	1	1	—
NCHA	2	3–2	.600	2	1	—	—
WIAC	1	2–1	.667	1	1	—	—
CNE	2	0–2	.000	1	—	—	—
LEC	1	1–1	.500	1	—	—	—
UCHC	1	1–1	.500	1	—	—	—
Independent	1	0–1	.000	—	—	—	—
MAC	1	0–1	.000	—	—	—	—
MASCAC	1	0–1	.000	—	—	—	—
MIAC	1	0–1	.000	—	—	—	—

== See also ==
- 2026 NCAA Division I men's ice hockey tournament
