= UCHC =

UCHC may refer to:

- University of Connecticut Health Center
- United Collegiate Hockey Conference
