= 2025–26 NCAA Division III men's ice hockey season =

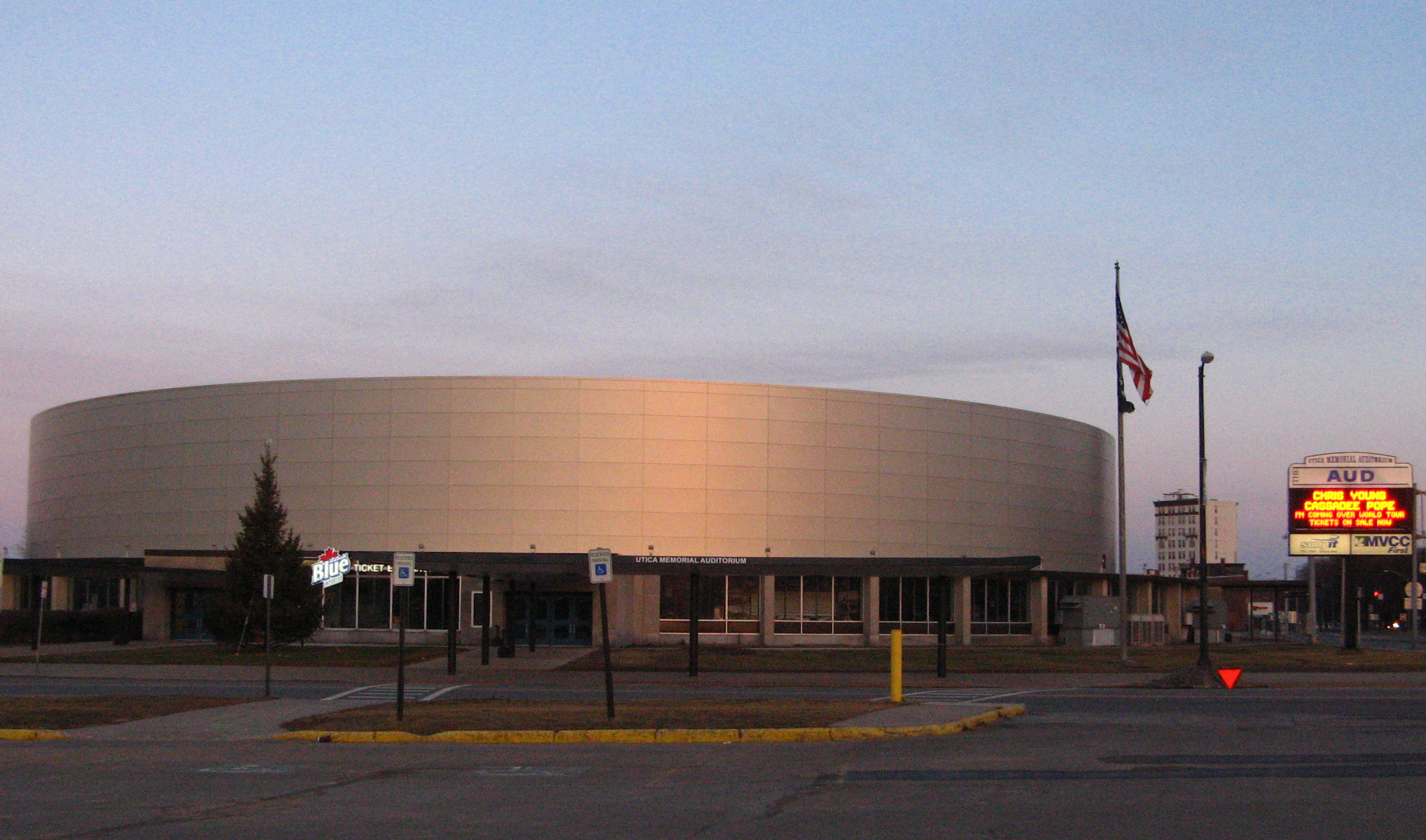
- Duration: October 31, 2025– March 29, 2026
- NCAA tournament: 2026
- National championship: Adirondack Bank Center; Utica, New York
- NCAA champion: Hamilton
- Sid Watson Award: Damon Beaver (Hobart)

The 2025–26 NCAA Division III men's ice hockey season began on October 31, 2025, and will conclude on March 29, 2026. This is the 53rd season of Division III college ice hockey.

== Regular season ==
=== Season tournaments ===
Tournament	Dates	Teams	Champion
Buffalo State Bengals Classic	October 31–November 1	4	Chatham
Key City Classic	October 31–November 1	4	Aurora
Woo Cup	October 31–November 2	4	Worcester State
LayerEight Shootout	November 28–29	4	Norwich
Superior Showdown	November 28–29	4	Dubuque
Terry Moran Invitational	November 28–29	4	St. John Fisher
Utica Thanksgiving Showcase	November 28–29	4	Hamilton
Bowdoin/Colby Classic	November 29–30	4	Bowdoin
Skidmore Invitational	November 29–30	4	Tufts
Tampa College Hockey Invitational	January 1–2	4	Geneseo
Codfish Bowl	January 2–3	4	Massachusetts Boston
Comfort Inn Complex Winter Classic	January 2–3	4	Amherst
NSB Holiday Tournament	January 2–3	4	Nazareth
Oswego Holiday Classic	January 2–3	4	Babson
The Lobster Pot	January 2–3	4	Bowdoin
Boston Landing Invitational	January 3–4	4	Nichols

=== Realignment ===
Carrying through on an announcement that had been made in the summer of 2024, the Little East Conference formally supported ice hockey beginning with this season. The return of Keene State's program a year earlier gave the conference six active ice hockey programs, the minimum number required to secure an automatic qualifying bid for the NCAA tournament. The five other active teams, Plymouth State, Southern Maine, UMass Boston, UMass Dartmouth and Vermont State Castleton, announced their departure from their previous conferences for this season. The six full Little East members were subsequently joined by three other teams, Babson, New England College and Norwich, as affiliate members while a seventh full member, Western Connecticut, announced that their ice hockey program would be starting this season.

The majority of the new LEC members had come from the New England Hockey Conference and left the NEHC severely reduced. While the league still had enough members (seven) to retain the league's automatic NCAA qualifier, the remaining clubs started looking for their own way out. In the spring of '25, Hobart and Skidmore agreed to join SUNYAC for this season while Albertus Magnus and Elmira departed for UCHC. Around the same time, Salem State also left the NEHC, joining its primary conference, MASCAC. The lone remaining team, Salve Regina, was unable to find a home for this season, however, they did eventually reach a deal to rejoin the Conference of New England in 2026.

=== Beloit - Northland ===
With the closure of Northland College following the 2024-25 academic year, the entire ice hockey program was transferred to Beloit College. The eligible players, staff and administration were all moved and Beloit assumed Northland's place in the Wisconsin Intercollegiate Athletic Conference.

=== New programs ===
Aside from Western Connecticut and Beloit, two other Division III programs were founded this season. Both Hiram College (independent) and St. John Fisher University (UCHC) played their first games this year. Additionally, Roger Williams University revived its ice hockey program, having last fielded a varsity team in 1998. The +4 change brought up the number of active programs to 91. Because the ratio of programs to NCAA seeds had recently been changed from 6.5:1 to 6:1, this meant that there were now enough active teams to merit fifteen spots for the 2026 tournament, increasing the number of at-large bids from four to five. Despite this, the NCAA tournament was not expanded and remained at 14 teams.

=== Standings ===
2025–26 Conference of New England ice hockey standings
	Conference										Overall					
	GP	W	L	T	OTW	OTL	SOW	PTS	GF	GA	GP	W	L	T	GF	GA
#8 University of New England †	20	17	3	0	0	0	0	51	85	32	28	21	7	0	121	54
#6 Endicott *	20	14	3	3	0	1	1	47	82	32	28	21	4	3	116	47
Suffolk	20	15	4	1	1	0	0	45	85	37	27	17	9	1	108	59
Curry	20	13	6	1	0	0	0	40	78	47	26	16	9	1	101	62
Nichols	20	7	12	1	0	0	0	22	46	64	26	11	14	1	63	82
Johnson & Wales	20	6	12	2	0	1	2	22	49	70	26	8	15	3	62	93
Wentworth	20	5	14	1	1	3	0	17	41	70	25	6	17	2	54	91
Roger Williams	20	4	15	1	1	1	1	14	34	91	25	6	18	1	48	111
Western New England	20	4	16	0	4	1	0	10	36	93	25	6	19	0	49	116
Championship: March 7 † indicates conference regular season champion * indicates conference tournament champions

2025–26 NCAA Division III Independent ice hockey standings
	Overall record					
	GP	W	L	T	GF	GA
Hiram	22	1	20	1	25	141
Salve Regina	24	19	5	0	113	42

2025–26 Little East Conference ice hockey standings
	Conference										Overall					
	GP	W	L	T	OTW	OTL	SOW	PTS	GF	GA	GP	W	L	T	GF	GA
#10 Norwich †*	18	13	2	3	0	1	3	46	71	35	30	20	6	4	111	59
#14 Babson	18	14	3	1	1	0	0	42	70	35	27	20	5	2	100	56
Plymouth State	18	11	6	1	1	0	0	33	72	59	27	15	11	1	106	93
Southern Maine	18	10	7	1	1	0	1	31	65	66	26	12	13	1	83	93
Massachusetts Boston	18	9	7	2	1	2	0	30	64	50	27	15	10	2	94	75
Vermont State Castleton	18	9	8	1	1	2	0	29	70	56	26	13	11	2	95	84
New England College	18	8	10	0	1	0	0	23	49	54	25	9	16	0	62	83
Massachusetts Dartmouth	18	7	11	0	0	0	0	21	58	75	25	12	13	0	81	93
Keene State	18	3	14	1	1	2	1	12	43	74	25	7	17	1	67	103
Western Connecticut	18	1	17	0	0	0	0	3	34	92	25	2	23	0	45	126
Championship: March 7 † indicates conference regular season champion * indicates conference tournament champion

2025–26 Massachusetts State Collegiate Athletic Conference ice hockey standings
	Conference									Overall					
	GP	W	L	T	OTW	OTL	PTS	GF	GA	GP	W	L	T	GF	GA
Anna Maria †*	14	12	1	1	0	0	37	65	27	28	20	6	2	101	65
Fitchburg State	14	10	4	0	1	0	29	58	29	26	17	9	0	104	64
Westfield State	14	9	3	2	0	0	29	45	32	28	18	8	2	96	69
Salem State	14	6	5	3	0	0	24	43	39	26	8	14	4	68	96
MCLA	14	5	8	1	0	0	16	39	40	27	8	16	3	71	82
Worcester State	14	3	8	3	0	2	14	33	46	26	10	12	4	76	78
Framingham State	14	4	10	0	1	0	11	28	60	25	7	18	0	70	110
Rivier	14	2	12	0	0	0	6	28	66	25	2	22	1	54	137
Championship: March 7 † indicates conference regular season champion * indicates conference tournament champions

2025–26 Middle Atlantic Conferences ice hockey standings
	Conference record										Overall record					
	GP	W	L	T	OW	OL	SW	PTS	GF	GA	GP	W	L	T	GF	GA
Neumann †*	21	14	5	2	0	0	2	46	74	48	28	17	9	2	94	75
Stevenson	21	14	6	1	3	0	1	41	71	43	27	16	10	1	89	63
Wilkes	21	12	7	2	0	1	2	41	63	46	26	15	8	3	82	59
Alvernia	21	13	8	0	1	0	0	38	63	46	26	15	11	0	73	63
Lebanon Valley	21	8	10	3	0	1	1	29	57	67	25	8	14	3	62	86
Arcadia	21	6	12	3	0	1	1	23	46	57	25	9	13	3	58	65
King's	21	4	13	4	0	0	1	17	44	77	25	4	17	5	57	100
Misericordia	21	5	15	1	0	1	0	17	41	75	25	5	19	1	46	91
Championship: March 7 † indicates conference regular season champion * indicates conference tournament champions

2025–26 Minnesota Intercollegiate Athletic Conference ice hockey standings
	Conference										Overall					
	GP	W	L	T	OTW	OTL	SOW	PTS	GF	GA	GP	W	L	T	GF	GA
Saint John's †*	16	10	3	3	1	1	2	35	60	38	28	17	7	4	103	75
Saint Mary's	16	10	5	1	0	1	1	33	61	42	26	14	10	2	97	78
Gustavus Adolphus	16	12	4	0	4	1	0	33	60	38	27	18	8	1	104	69
Bethel	16	9	7	0	0	3	0	30	51	43	27	14	12	1	82	73
St. Olaf	16	8	6	2	1	1	0	26	47	39	26	12	9	5	76	71
Concordia (MN)	16	6	9	1	2	0	1	18	40	41	25	11	12	2	70	67
Hamline	16	4	10	2	1	1	2	16	34	66	25	4	18	3	53	105
Augsburg	16	4	10	2	0	1	0	15	35	51	25	7	15	3	73	82
St. Scholastica	16	3	12	1	0	0	0	10	37	67	25	6	18	1	56	96
Championship: March 7 † indicates conference regular season champion * indicates conference tournament champion

2025–26 New England Small College Athletic Conference ice hockey standings
	Conference										Overall					
	GP	W	L	T	OTW	OTL	SOW	PTS	GF	GA	GP	W	L	T	GF	GA
#1 Hamilton †	18	14	3	1	3	1	1	42	63	27	30	23	5	2	116	55
#12 Bowdoin	18	13	4	1	2	0	0	38	57	33	26	18	7	1	88	50
Tufts	18	9	9	0	0	3	0	30	55	45	25	12	12	1	76	66
Middlebury	18	9	7	2	1	0	0	28	46	45	27	15	9	3	70	67
Wesleyan	18	8	10	0	0	1	0	25	41	54	25	9	16	0	53	76
Williams *	18	8	10	0	2	2	0	24	52	65	28	12	14	2	84	100
Amherst	18	7	10	1	0	0	0	22	42	49	25	12	11	2	60	61
Connecticut College	18	6	11	1	0	1	1	21	43	63	24	9	14	1	65	83
Trinity	18	6	11	1	1	2	1	21	51	58	24	12	11	1	83	63
Colby	18	6	11	1	2	1	1	19	44	55	23	9	12	2	59	68
Championship: March 8 † indicates conference regular season champion * indicates conference tournament champion

2025–26 Northern Collegiate Hockey Association standings
	Conference										Overall					
	GP	W	L	T	OTW	OTL	SOW	PTS	GF	GA	GP	W	L	T	GF	GA
#9 Adrian †	18	14	4	1	0	1	1	45	91	31	28	20	7	1	139	56
#5 St. Norbert *	18	13	3	2	1	0	1	41	76	33	31	22	7	2	129	64
#15 Trine	18	12	4	2	1	1	1	39	70	43	28	18	8	2	99	64
#3 Aurora	18	13	4	1	3	0	1	38	86	48	32	25	6	1	149	78
MSOE	18	7	8	3	0	1	0	25	53	59	27	10	14	3	72	91
Marian	18	8	10	0	3	1	0	22	53	70	27	9	16	2	71	105
Lake Forest	18	6	11	1	0	1	1	21	54	84	27	6	19	2	77	141
Concordia (WI)	18	6	11	1	0	0	0	19	52	76	27	10	16	1	84	107
Dubuque	18	3	13	2	0	1	1	13	46	82	25	6	17	2	67	109
Lawrence	18	1	16	1	0	1	0	4	34	89	25	6	18	1	57	109
Championship: March 7 † indicates conference regular season champion * indicates conference tournament champion

2025–26 State University of New York Athletic Conference ice hockey standings
	Conference								Overall					
	GP	W	L	T	OTL	PTS	GF	GA	GP	W	L	T	GF	GA
#2 Hobart †*	18	18	0	0	0	36	100	16	31	30	1	0	158	30
#13 Oswego State	18	14	4	0	0	28	73	36	28	19	7	2	108	65
Skidmore	18	11	6	1	1	24	59	41	28	15	10	2	90	72
Cortland State	18	10	7	1	3	24	63	43	27	14	12	1	89	69
Canton State	18	8	9	1	2	19	48	52	26	12	13	1	67	72
Plattsburgh State	18	9	9	0	0	18	48	49	26	13	13	0	74	69
Buffalo State	18	6	11	1	0	16	43	60	26	9	16	1	68	83
Fredonia State	18	4	13	1	4	13	35	64	26	4	21	1	48	103
Potsdam State	18	4	12	2	1	11	46	75	25	7	16	2	63	97
Morrisville State	18	1	14	3	0	5	19	98	25	2	20	3	31	131
Championship: March 7 † indicates conference regular season champion * indicates conference tournament champions

2025–26 United Collegiate Hockey Conference standings
	Conference record										Overall record					
	GP	W	L	T	OW	OL	SW	PTS	GF	GA	GP	W	L	T	GF	GA
#7 Utica †*	16	13	2	1	0	1	1	42	85	32	29	20	8	1	127	67
#11 Geneseo State	16	12	4	0	1	1	0	36	64	35	27	18	8	1	104	69
Chatham	16	10	5	1	1	0	0	30	59	43	27	20	6	1	136	66
Nazareth	16	9	6	1	1	0	0	27	50	44	27	16	8	3	85	71
Albertus Magnus	16	8	8	0	0	0	0	24	49	52	26	16	10	0	92	78
Brockport State	16	6	10	0	0	2	0	20	43	58	26	10	16	0	72	91
St. John Fisher	16	5	11	0	0	0	0	15	30	53	25	12	13	0	65	71
Elmira	16	4	11	1	0	0	1	14	50	70	25	6	18	1	76	113
Manhattanville	16	3	13	0	1	0	0	8	26	69	25	4	20	1	43	105
Championship: March 7 † indicates conference regular season champion * indicates conference tournament champions

2025–26 Wisconsin Intercollegiate Athletic Conference ice hockey standings
	Conference										Overall					
	GP	W	L	T	OTW	OTL	SOW	PTS	GF	GA	GP	W	L	T	GF	GA
#4 Wisconsin–Stout †*	15	12	2	1	1	0	1	37	48	25	30	23	6	1	112	69
Wisconsin–Eau Claire	15	11	3	1	2	0	1	33	54	31	26	16	8	2	79	62
Wisconsin–River Falls	15	7	8	0	1	1	0	21	51	45	27	14	12	1	93	77
Wisconsin–Superior	15	6	8	1	0	2	0	21	37	42	26	13	11	2	70	64
Wisconsin–Stevens Point	15	6	8	1	0	1	0	20	46	39	27	12	13	2	78	68
Beloit	15	1	14	0	0	0	0	3	20	74	25	4	20	1	51	114
Championship: March 7 † indicates conference regular season champion * indicates conference tournament champion

Note: Mini-games are not included in standings

== Player stats ==
=== Scoring leaders ===
GP = Games played; G = Goals; A = Assists; Pts = Points; PIM = Penalty minutes

Player	Class	Team	GP	G	A	Pts	PIM
Jonathan Surrette	Junior	Assumption	33	34	31	65	51
Ian Amsbaugh	Junior	Adrian	28	12	37	49	18
Joona Juntunen	Sophomore	Saint Mary's	25	21	25	46	4
Tyler Stewart	Senior	Massachusetts Dartmouth	25	21	24	45	24
Nicholas Cyprian	Senior	Chatham	27	18	27	45	28
Keenan Ingram	Freshman	Wisconsin–River Falls	27	26	17	43	6
Arvega Hovsepyan	Sophomore	Hobart	31	11	32	43	8
Kahlil Fontana	Senior	Hobart	31	21	21	42	6
Drew Olivieri	Junior	University of New England	28	19	23	42	18
Dom Murphy	Junior	University of New England	27	11	30	41	19

=== Leading goaltenders ===
GP = Games played; Min = Minutes played; W = Wins; L = Losses; T = Ties; GA = Goals against; SO = Shutouts; SV% = Save percentage; GAA = Goals against average

Player	Class	Team	GP	Min	W	L	T	GA	SO	SV%	GAA
Mavrick Goyer	Senior	Hobart	10	561	9	0	0	9	6	.942	0.96
Damon Beaver	Senior	Hobart	21	1207	20	1	0	20	7	.951	0.99
Selby Warren	Junior	Salve Regina	19	1046	14	4	0	27	4	.940	1.55
Peter Sterling	Freshman	Endicott	27	1619	21	4	2	44	5	.933	1.63
Jacob Osborne	Sophomore	Bowdoin	24	1452	17	6	1	41	4	.940	1.69
Michael Salvatore	Sophomore	Assumption	17	1033	14	1	2	30	2	.953	1.74
Harrison Chesney	Senior	University of New England	27	1564	20	7	0	46	5	.918	1.76
Caleb Chabot	Freshman	Albertus Magnus	11	848	4	2	0	10	0	.934	1.79
Aksel Reid	Junior	Hamilton	28	1666	20	5	2	51	5	.924	1.84
Matt Hennessey	Junior	Anna Maria	24	1440	17	4	2	45	2	.944	1.87

== NCAA Percentage Index ==
The NCAA Percentage Index (NPI) are a statistical tool designed to approximate the process by which the NCAA selection committee decides which teams get at-large bids to the 13-team NCAA tournament.

The NCAA committee began using the NPI for Division III ice hockey in 2024–25, having previously used a similar metric called the PairWise Rankings (PWR). The PWR remained in use for the Division I level.

The NCAA Percentage Index is the tool used to select teams for the national collegiate ice hockey tournament for Men's and Women's Division III. Only results from games between Division III teams are used. The contribution of each individual game is weighted by a factor of 1.1 for a road win or home loss and 0.9 for a home win or road loss. Factors involved are 1) the team's weighted winning percentage; 2) the weighted average percentage of the team's opponents NPI;

A team's record is based only on games against other Division III hockey schools which are eligible for the NCAA Tournament.

NCAA Division I Men's Hockey PairWise Rankings
Rank	Team	NPI	SOS	Conference
1	Hobart	66.668*	49.435	SUNYAC
2	Endicott	59.211*	49.851	CNE
3	Hamilton	58.493*	52.665	NESCAC
4	Utica	58.428	53.525	UCHC
5	Wisconsin–Stout	57.778*	50.637	WIAC
6	Salve Regina	57.667*	47.141	Independent
7	Aurora	57.636	50.371	NCHA
8	St. Norbert	57.627	51.253	NCHA
9	University of New England	57.497*	50.645	CNE
10	Adrian	57.478*	50.694	NCHA
11	Bowdoin	57.383	53.644	NESCAC
12	Geneseo State	56.641	52.130	UCHC
13	Babson	56.625	49.791	LEC
14	Oswego State	56.315*	51.242	SUNYAC
15	Norwich	56.271*	49.947	LEC
16	Saint John's	55.484	50.421	MIAC
17	Middlebury	55.409	53.748	NESCAC
18	Trine	55.244	50.485	NCHA
19	Chatham	55.088*	47.818	UCHC
20	Anna Maria	54.887*	46.753	MASCAC
21	Nazareth	54.669	51.959	UCHC
22	Curry	54.274	50.647	CNE
23	Tufts	54.167	54.272	NESCAC
24	Suffolk	54.154	49.888	CNE
25	Gustavus Adolphus	54.061	50.449	MIAC
26	Wisconsin–Eau Claire	53.800	50.950	WIAC
27	Williams	53.277	54.144	NESCAC
28	Neumann	53.010	48.583	MAC
29	Amherst	52.841	53.695	NESCAC
30	Trinity	52.793	52.292	NESCAC
31	Saint Mary's	52.583	49.932	MIAC
32	Wilkes	52.417	48.221	MAC
33	Massachusetts Boston	52.414	49.079	LEC
34	Bethel	52.221	50.588	MIAC
35	Cortland State	52.121	50.427	SUNYAC
36	Plymouth State	51.923	50.528	LEC
37	Skidmore	51.899	50.672	SUNYAC
38	Wisconsin–Superior	51.864	50.284	WIAC
39	St. Olaf	51.740	50.839	MIAC
40	Albertus Magnus	51.723	49.768	UCHC
41	Wisconsin–Stevens Point	51.340	51.079	WIAC
42	Westfield State	51.315	46.674	MASCAC
43	Stevenson	51.282	48.886	MAC
44	Fitchburg State	51.225	47.619	MASCAC
45	Canton State	50.923	50.708	SUNYAC
46	Wisconsin–River Falls	50.873	50.748	WIAC
47	Connecticut College	50.805	53.365	NESCAC
48	Alvernia	50.688	48.475	MAC
49	Colby	50.455	53.895	NESCAC
50	Vermont State Castleton	50.208	49.049	LEC
51	MSOE	50.082	51.327	NCHA
52	Wesleyan	50.041	54.098	NESCAC
53	St. John Fisher	49.717	50.211	UCHC
54	Brockport State	49.315^	51.740	UCHC
55	Nichols	49.250	51.242	CNE
56	Plattsburgh State	49.027^	51.054	SUNYAC
57	Southern Maine	48.917	50.372	LEC
58	Concordia (MN)	48.593	50.221	MIAC
59	Concordia (WI)	48.442	50.617	NCHA
60	Johnson & Wales	47.936	51.233	CNE
61	Massachusetts Dartmouth	47.875	48.568	LEC
62	Augsburg	47.278	50.347	MIAC
63	Marian	46.818	51.250	NCHA
64	Buffalo State	46.791^	50.336	SUNYAC
65	Lebanon Valley	46.563	48.352	MAC
66	New England College	46.453	49.854	LEC
67	Salem State	46.196	49.955	MASCAC
68	Arcadia	46.180	48.754	MAC
69	Elmira	46.121^	53.415	UCHC
70	Wentworth	46.066	51.941	CNE
71	Dubuque	45.682	51.941	NCHA
72	Potsdam State	45.682^	50.110	SUNYAC
73	Lake Forest	45.672	51.867	NCHA
74	Worcester State	45.307	46.877	MASCAC
75	Hamline	45.095	51.567	MIAC
76	Lawrence	44.689	50.311	NCHA
77	Manhattanville	44.592^	53.388	UCHC
78	MCLA	44.477	46.498	MASCAC
79	Roger Williams	44.421	50.265	CNE
80	St. Scholastica	44.278	50.012	MIAC
81	Keene State	44.268	50.037	LEC
82	Misericordia	43.243	49.702	MAC
83	Fredonia State	43.227^	51.633	SUNYAC
84	Western New England	43.067^	50.817	CNE
85	King's	43.054	48.772	MAC
86	Framingham State	41.669	48.024	MASCAC
87	Beloit	41.499^	49.601	WIAC
88	Morrisville State	41.000^	51.779	SUNYAC
89	Western Connecticut	39.849^	50.695	LEC
90	Rivier	39.114^	49.240	MASCAC
91	Hiram	36.628^	49.973	Independent
* A team's RPI has been adjusted to remove negative effect from defeating a weak opponent.^ A team's RPI has been adjusted to remove positive effect from losing to a strong opponent. Note: A team's record is based only on games against other Division III hockey schools which are eligible for the NCAA Tournament.

== 2026 NCAA Tournament ==
First round March 14
W3	St. Norbert (8)	5
E6	University of New England (9)	4
W1	Wisconsin–Stout (5)	4
E8	Anna Maria (12)	1
E4	Utica (4)	3
E9	Williams (13)	0
W2	Aurora (7)	6
W4	Saint John's (10)	1
E5	Salve Regina (6)	1
E7	Norwich (11)	6
E3	Hamilton (3)	6
E10	Neumann (14)	2

Quarterfinals; March 21
E1	Hobart (1)	2
W3	St. Norbert (8)	1
W1	Wisconsin–Stout (5)	5
E4	Utica (4)	1
E2	Endicott (2)	2
W2	Aurora (7)	3**
E7	Norwich (11)	1
E3	Hamilton (3)	2*

Semifinals; March 27
E1	Hobart (1)	4
W1	Wisconsin–Stout (5)	2
W2	Aurora (7)	3
E3	Hamilton (3)	6

National Championship; March 29
E1	Hobart (1)	1
E3	Hamilton (3)	2*

Note: * denotes overtime period(s)

== See also ==
- 2025–26 NCAA Division I men's ice hockey season
- 2025–26 NCAA Division II men's ice hockey season
