= Middle Atlantic Conferences men's ice hockey tournament =

Middle Atlantic Conferences men's ice hockey Tournament
- Middle Atlantic Conferences
- Sport: Ice hockey
- Conference: Middle Atlantic Conferences
- Format: Single-elimination
- Played: 2025–Present

The Middle Atlantic Conferences men's ice hockey tournament is the end-of-the-year Men's ice hockey tournament for the top teams of the Middle Atlantic Conferences. The inaugural title holder in 2025 was Stevenson University.

== History ==
When the United Collegiate Hockey Conference was founded in 2017, the conference contained all active programs whose primary conference was the Middle Atlantic Conferences. Due to this, the MAC began awarding an ice hockey championship to the member team that finished with the best record.

In 2024, Misericordia began sponsoring men's ice hockey, which brought the number of active programs up to six, the minimum number required to receive an automatic bid into the NCAA tournament. As a result, the conference formed its own ice hockey division for the first time and instituted a conference tournament for the 2024–25 season.

== 2025 ==
| Seed | School | Conference Record |
|---|---|---|
| 1 | Wilkes | 16–3–2–1–1–1 |
| 2 | Stevenson | 13–6–2–1–1–2 |
| 3 | Neumann | 13–5–3–1–0–0 |
| 4 | Alvernia | 9–10–2–0–1–1 |

Semifinals; March 1
1 | Wilkes | 4
4 | Alvernia | 0
2 | Stevenson | 2*
3 | Neumann | 1

Championship; March 8
1 | Wilkes | 1
2 | Stevenson | 4

Note: * denotes overtime period(s)

== 2026 ==
| Seed | School | Conference Record |
|---|---|---|
| 1 | Neumann | 14–5–2–0–0–2 |
| 2 | Stevenson | 14–6–1–3–0–1 |
| 3 | Wilkes | 12–7–2–0–1–2 |
| 4 | Alvernia | 13–8–0–1–0–0 |

Semifinals; February 28
1 | Neumann | 5
4 | Alvernia | 0
2 | Stevenson | 6
3 | Wilkes | 2

Championship; March 7
1 | Neumann | 5*
2 | Stevenson | 4

Note: * denotes overtime period(s)

== Championships ==
| School | Championships |
|---|---|
| Neumann | 1 |
| Stevenson | 1 |

== See also ==
- UCHC men's ice hockey tournament
