= 2024–25 NCAA Division III men's ice hockey season =

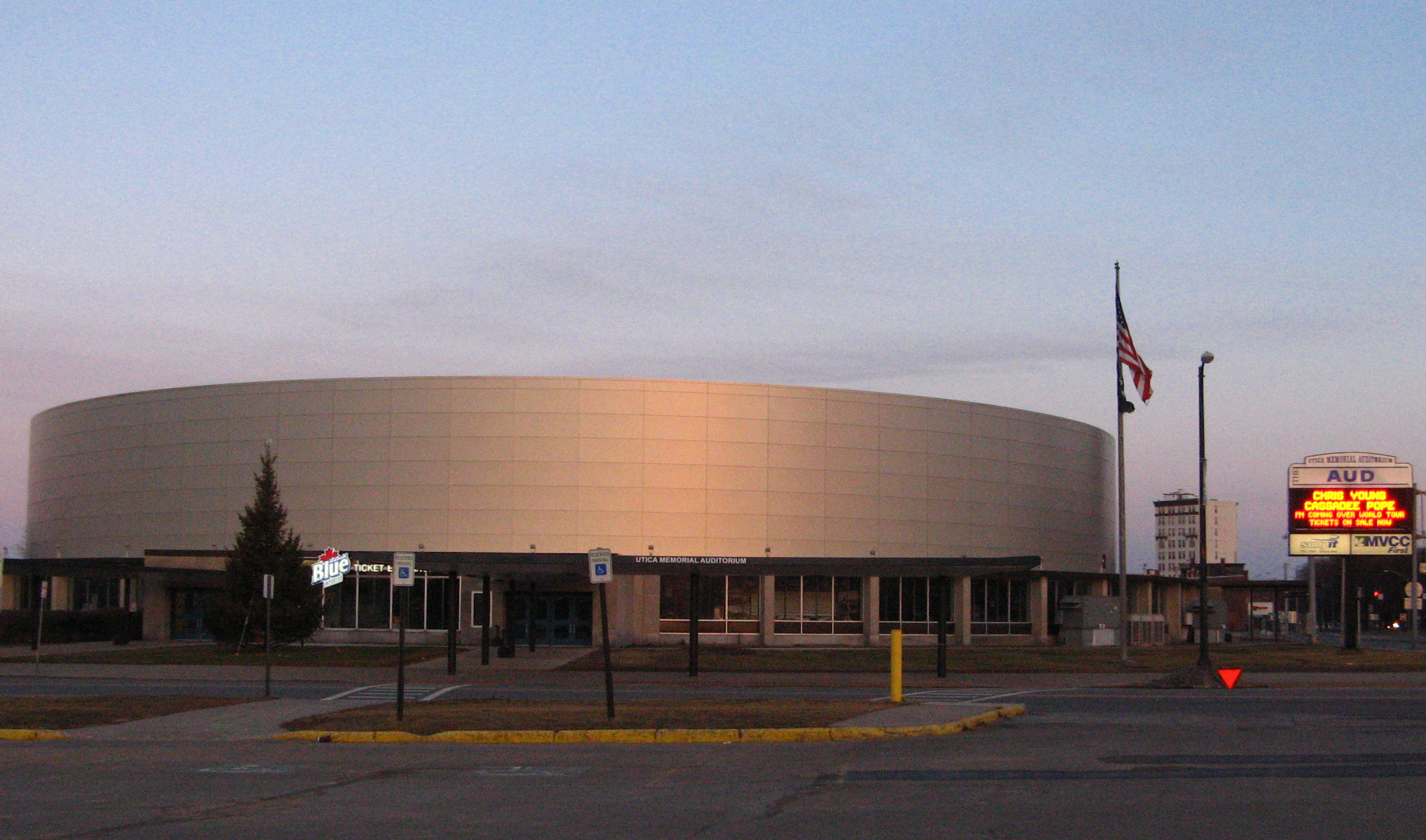
- Duration: November 1, 2024– March 30, 2025
- NCAA tournament: 2025
- National championship: Utica Memorial Auditorium; Utica, New York
- NCAA champion: Hobart
- Sid Watson Award: Shane Soderwall (Curry)

The 2024–25 NCAA Division III men's ice hockey season began on November 1, 2024, and concluded on March 30, 2025. This was the 52nd season of Division III college ice hockey.

== Regular season ==
=== Realignment ===
With Misericordia adding ice hockey as a varsity sport, the Middle Atlantic Conferences (MAC) had six conference members sponsoring varsity ice hockey (the minimum number required for an automatic bid into the NCAA tournament). As a result, MAC, who had been sponsoring ice hockey since 2017, was able to finally form an independent conference for the first time. Five of the six member teams had been in the UCHC and all announced that they would be leaving in 2024. Shortly thereafter, two additional teams (Neumann and Wilkes) announced that they would leave the UCHC and join MAC as affiliate members.

The loss of seven teams would have left the UCHC with just four active programs. However, before the departure of Neumann and Wilkes, the UCHC was able to secure two new members as both Brockport State and Geneseo State announced their intention to leave SUNYAC for the UCHC. This allowed the UCHC to retain its automatic bid for the tournament and reduced the number of at-large bids by one.

Four previously independent teams joined conferences this season with Anna Maria and Rivier joining MASCAC, Albertus Magnus joining NEHC and Canton State joining SUNYAC.

=== Rebranding ===
For its 40th anniversary, the Commonwealth Coast Conference changed its name to the Conference of New England (CNE). Prior to the change in name, Salve Regina had announced that it would be leaving the Commonwealth Coast Conference for New England Hockey Conference in 2024. Similarly, Johnson & Wales had announced their plan to leave NEHC and join CCC as a full member for the 2024–25 season almost two years earlier.

=== Closing ===
Due to a financial shortfall, Northland College had begun the academic year by attempting to reorganize the school. Along with a fundraising effort from more than 1,000 donors, the college cut several programs as well as a significant number of staff. This also led to a reduction in the student body which, although would further reduce operating costs, also decreased the incoming revenue. Despite the drastic measures, by February the board of trustees had come to realize that there was no viable path forward for the school. They voted unanimously to close the college following the conclusion of the academic year, shuttering the school which had been in operation since 1892. A few days later, Northland played its final men's ice hockey games, losing in the WIAC quarterfinals. Afterwards, in a similar situation to what happened to Finlandia University two years earlier, Beloit College announced that they would be adding men's and women's ice hockey for 2025 and invited all staff and players from Northland to transfer over.

=== Season tournaments ===
| Tournament | Dates | Teams | Champion |
|---|---|---|---|
| Buffalo State Tournament | November 1–2 | 4 | Saint Anselm |
| Key City Classic | November 1–2 | 4 | Aurora |
| Western Massachusetts Invitational | November 1–2 | 4 | Westfield State |
| Worcester City Cup | November 1, 3 | 4 | Anna Maria |
| LayerEight Shootout | November 29–30 | 4 | Middlebury |
| Superior Showdown | November 29–30 | 4 | St. Scholastica |
| Terry Moran Invitational Tournament | November 29–30 | 4 | Vermont State Castleton |
| Utica Thanksgiving Showcase | November 29–30 | 4 | Utica |
| Bowdoin/Colby Tournament | November 30–December 1 | 4 | Colby |
| North Country Tournament | November 30–December 1 | 4 | Tufts |
| Skidmore Thanksgiving Invitational | November 30–December 1 | 4 | Lake Forest |
| Codfish Bowl | January 3–4 | 4 | Wisconsin–Superior |
| Northfield Savings Bank Tournament | January 3–4 | 4 | Hamilton |
| Oswego State Classic | January 3–4 | 4 | Oswego State |
| Tampa College Hockey Invitational | January 3–4 | 4 | MSOE |
| Boston Landing Invitational | January 4–5 | 4 | Salem State |
| Plattsburgh Winter Classic | January 11–12 | 4 | University of New England |

=== Standings ===
2024–25 Conference of New England ice hockey standings
| | Conference | | | | | | | | | | Overall | | | | | |
| | GP | W | L | T | OTW | OTL | SOW | PTS | GF | GA | GP | W | L | T | GF | GA |
|---|---|---|---|---|---|---|---|---|---|---|---|---|---|---|---|---|
| Curry †* | 18 | 16 | 2 | 0 | 0 | 1 | 0 | 49 | 71 | 22 | 29 | 25 | 4 | 0 | 117 | 43 |
| University of New England | 18 | 14 | 4 | 0 | 0 | 1 | 0 | 43 | 72 | 31 | 27 | 18 | 8 | 1 | 112 | 59 |
| Endicott | 18 | 14 | 3 | 1 | 5 | 0 | 1 | 39 | 75 | 36 | 28 | 19 | 8 | 1 | 104 | 61 |
| Suffolk | 18 | 7 | 9 | 2 | 0 | 2 | 2 | 27 | 32 | 40 | 27 | 13 | 11 | 3 | 58 | 54 |
| Nichols | 18 | 5 | 9 | 4 | 1 | 0 | 0 | 18 | 44 | 60 | 26 | 9 | 13 | 4 | 66 | 78 |
| Wentworth | 18 | 5 | 12 | 1 | 1 | 1 | 1 | 17 | 37 | 59 | 26 | 7 | 17 | 2 | 59 | 85 |
| Johnson & Wales | 18 | 4 | 12 | 2 | 1 | 1 | 2 | 16 | 42 | 65 | 25 | 9 | 14 | 2 | 63 | 82 |
| Western New England | 18 | 1 | 15 | 2 | 0 | 2 | 0 | 7 | 32 | 92 | 25 | 5 | 18 | 2 | 55 | 104 |
Championship: March 8 † indicates conference regular season champion * indicates conference tournament champions

2024–25 NCAA Division III Independent ice hockey standings
| | Overall record | | | | | |
| | GP | W | L | T | GF | GA |
|---|---|---|---|---|---|---|
| Keene State | 22 | 11 | 10 | 1 | 74 | 74 |

2024–25 Massachusetts State Collegiate Athletic Conference ice hockey standings
| | Conference | | | | | | | | | Overall | | | | | |
| | GP | W | L | T | OTW | OTL | PTS | GF | GA | GP | W | L | T | GF | GA |
|---|---|---|---|---|---|---|---|---|---|---|---|---|---|---|---|
| Plymouth State † | 18 | 16 | 2 | 0 | 2 | 0 | 46 | 86 | 28 | 26 | 19 | 7 | 0 | 110 | 52 |
| Anna Maria | 18 | 14 | 4 | 0 | 1 | 0 | 41 | 76 | 45 | 27 | 19 | 8 | 0 | 107 | 68 |
| Salem State | 18 | 14 | 4 | 0 | 1 | 0 | 41 | 72 | 43 | 26 | 19 | 7 | 0 | 98 | 64 |
| Fitchburg State * | 18 | 8 | 9 | 1 | 1 | 3 | 28 | 61 | 54 | 29 | 15 | 13 | 1 | 91 | 82 |
| Worcester State | 18 | 8 | 8 | 2 | 0 | 1 | 27 | 51 | 64 | 26 | 11 | 13 | 2 | 71 | 94 |
| Massachusetts Dartmouth | 18 | 8 | 9 | 1 | 1 | 1 | 25 | 53 | 62 | 26 | 11 | 14 | 1 | 77 | 93 |
| Westfield State | 18 | 8 | 10 | 0 | 1 | 1 | 24 | 41 | 46 | 26 | 12 | 14 | 0 | 64 | 73 |
| MCLA | 18 | 4 | 12 | 2 | 1 | 2 | 16 | 39 | 61 | 28 | 6 | 20 | 2 | 53 | 98 |
| Framingham State | 18 | 2 | 14 | 2 | 0 | 1 | 11 | 43 | 81 | 25 | 3 | 19 | 3 | 58 | 112 |
| Rivier | 18 | 3 | 13 | 2 | 1 | 0 | 11 | 34 | 72 | 25 | 7 | 16 | 2 | 53 | 95 |
Championship: March 8 † indicates conference regular season champion * indicates conference tournament champions

2024–25 Middle Atlantic Conferences standings
| | Conference record | | | | | | | | | | Overall record | | | | | |
| | GP | W | L | T | OW | OL | SW | PTS | GF | GA | GP | W | L | T | GF | GA |
|---|---|---|---|---|---|---|---|---|---|---|---|---|---|---|---|---|
| Wilkes † | 21 | 16 | 3 | 2 | 1 | 1 | 1 | 51 | 83 | 41 | 27 | 17 | 8 | 2 | 96 | 63 |
| Stevenson * | 21 | 13 | 6 | 2 | 1 | 1 | 2 | 43 | 72 | 53 | 28 | 18 | 8 | 2 | 93 | 72 |
| Neumann | 21 | 13 | 5 | 3 | 1 | 0 | 0 | 41 | 83 | 57 | 26 | 16 | 7 | 3 | 100 | 75 |
| Alvernia | 21 | 9 | 10 | 2 | 0 | 1 | 1 | 31 | 67 | 67 | 26 | 11 | 13 | 2 | 85 | 86 |
| Arcadia | 21 | 9 | 10 | 2 | 1 | 1 | 1 | 30 | 48 | 54 | 25 | 11 | 12 | 2 | 60 | 67 |
| King's | 21 | 7 | 12 | 2 | 1 | 1 | 1 | 24 | 59 | 68 | 25 | 9 | 14 | 2 | 74 | 82 |
| Lebanon Valley | 21 | 5 | 15 | 1 | 1 | 1 | 1 | 17 | 40 | 75 | 25 | 6 | 18 | 1 | 48 | 95 |
| Misericordia | 21 | 4 | 15 | 2 | 0 | 0 | 1 | 15 | 45 | 82 | 25 | 4 | 18 | 3 | 54 | 99 |
Championship: March 8 † indicates conference regular season champion * indicates conference tournament champions

2024–25 Minnesota Intercollegiate Athletic Conference ice hockey standings
| | Conference | | | | | | | | | | Overall | | | | | |
| | GP | W | L | T | OTW | OTL | SOW | PTS | GF | GA | GP | W | L | T | GF | GA |
|---|---|---|---|---|---|---|---|---|---|---|---|---|---|---|---|---|
| Gustavus Adolphus †* | 16 | 10 | 4 | 2 | 2 | 1 | 2 | 33 | 63 | 44 | 28 | 16 | 10 | 2 | 103 | 74 |
| Bethel | 16 | 9 | 5 | 2 | 3 | 1 | 2 | 29 | 55 | 45 | 26 | 13 | 10 | 3 | 79 | 71 |
| St. Olaf | 16 | 8 | 7 | 1 | 0 | 0 | 1 | 26 | 48 | 44 | 27 | 14 | 10 | 3 | 79 | 73 |
| Saint John's | 16 | 8 | 7 | 1 | 0 | 1 | 0 | 26 | 50 | 41 | 26 | 11 | 14 | 1 | 78 | 74 |
| Concordia (MN) | 16 | 7 | 6 | 3 | 1 | 0 | 0 | 23 | 45 | 45 | 27 | 12 | 12 | 3 | 76 | 79 |
| St. Scholastica | 16 | 7 | 8 | 1 | 0 | 0 | 1 | 23 | 48 | 44 | 25 | 12 | 11 | 2 | 80 | 67 |
| Saint Mary's | 16 | 7 | 8 | 1 | 0 | 0 | 1 | 23 | 42 | 49 | 25 | 11 | 13 | 1 | 75 | 76 |
| Hamline | 16 | 6 | 10 | 0 | 0 | 1 | 0 | 19 | 47 | 64 | 25 | 8 | 17 | 0 | 66 | 107 |
| Augsburg | 16 | 4 | 11 | 1 | 0 | 1 | 0 | 14 | 34 | 56 | 25 | 8 | 16 | 1 | 56 | 85 |
Championship: March 8 † indicates conference regular season champion * indicates conference tournament champion

2024–25 New England Hockey Conference standings
| | Conference | | | | | | | | | Overall | | | | | |
| | GP | W | L | T | OW | OL | PTS | GF | GA | GP | W | L | T | GF | GA |
|---|---|---|---|---|---|---|---|---|---|---|---|---|---|---|---|
| Hobart †* | 20 | 18 | 1 | 1 | 0 | 1 | 56 | 88 | 23 | 31 | 29 | 1 | 1 | 127 | 32 |
| Norwich | 20 | 12 | 6 | 2 | 1 | 0 | 37 | 62 | 50 | 28 | 15 | 10 | 3 | 73 | 69 |
| Babson | 20 | 11 | 8 | 1 | 0 | 2 | 36 | 61 | 56 | 26 | 13 | 11 | 2 | 72 | 75 |
| Skidmore | 20 | 11 | 9 | 0 | 0 | 0 | 33 | 70 | 58 | 27 | 14 | 13 | 0 | 90 | 81 |
| Salve Regina | 20 | 10 | 10 | 0 | 2 | 4 | 32 | 69 | 67 | 26 | 12 | 11 | 3 | 94 | 80 |
| New England College | 20 | 9 | 10 | 1 | 0 | 1 | 29 | 48 | 51 | 27 | 11 | 15 | 1 | 61 | 73 |
| Elmira | 20 | 10 | 9 | 1 | 4 | 0 | 27 | 53 | 56 | 26 | 13 | 11 | 2 | 70 | 68 |
| Albertus Magnus | 20 | 9 | 10 | 1 | 3 | 2 | 27 | 62 | 62 | 26 | 12 | 13 | 1 | 71 | 72 |
| Massachusetts Boston | 20 | 8 | 11 | 1 | 1 | 0 | 24 | 57 | 74 | 25 | 10 | 14 | 1 | 68 | 88 |
| Southern Maine | 20 | 4 | 15 | 1 | 2 | 1 | 12 | 38 | 78 | 25 | 7 | 17 | 1 | 56 | 100 |
| Vermont State Castleton | 20 | 3 | 16 | 1 | 0 | 2 | 12 | 54 | 87 | 25 | 5 | 18 | 2 | 69 | 103 |
Championship: March 9 † indicates conference regular season champion * indicates conference tournament champion

2024–25 New England Small College Athletic Conference ice hockey standings
| | Conference | | | | | | | | | | Overall | | | | | |
| | GP | W | L | T | OTW | OTL | SOW | PTS | GF | GA | GP | W | L | T | GF | GA |
|---|---|---|---|---|---|---|---|---|---|---|---|---|---|---|---|---|
| Hamilton †* | 18 | 13 | 4 | 1 | 0 | 0 | 0 | 39 | 55 | 46 | 29 | 21 | 7 | 1 | 107 | 55 |
| Trinity | 18 | 12 | 4 | 2 | 0 | 0 | 0 | 36 | 61 | 22 | 25 | 16 | 7 | 2 | 85 | 52 |
| Colby | 18 | 8 | 5 | 5 | 2 | 0 | 1 | 28 | 41 | 48 | 26 | 14 | 6 | 6 | 81 | 64 |
| Bowdoin | 18 | 7 | 8 | 3 | 0 | 0 | 0 | 27 | 46 | 34 | 25 | 9 | 13 | 3 | 61 | 80 |
| Tufts | 18 | 8 | 10 | 0 | 0 | 2 | 1 | 26 | 54 | 45 | 26 | 12 | 13 | 1 | 72 | 69 |
| Amherst | 18 | 8 | 8 | 2 | 0 | 0 | 0 | 26 | 57 | 55 | 25 | 11 | 12 | 2 | 77 | 70 |
| Middlebury | 18 | 8 | 9 | 1 | 0 | 0 | 0 | 25 | 41 | 48 | 26 | 13 | 12 | 1 | 74 | 67 |
| Connecticut College | 18 | 7 | 10 | 1 | 0 | 0 | 1 | 23 | 42 | 53 | 25 | 9 | 14 | 2 | 54 | 80 |
| Williams | 18 | 5 | 11 | 2 | 1 | 3 | 1 | 20 | 47 | 64 | 24 | 8 | 13 | 3 | 53 | 76 |
| Wesleyan | 18 | 5 | 12 | 1 | 1 | 1 | 0 | 16 | 45 | 64 | 24 | 6 | 15 | 3 | 55 | 79 |
Championship: March 9 † indicates conference regular season champion * indicates conference tournament champion

2024–25 Northern Collegiate Hockey Association standings
| | Conference | | | | | | | | | | Overall | | | | | |
| | GP | W | L | T | OTW | OTL | SOW | PTS | GF | GA | GP | W | L | T | GF | GA |
|---|---|---|---|---|---|---|---|---|---|---|---|---|---|---|---|---|
| Aurora † | 18 | 15 | 2 | 1 | 1 | 1 | 1 | 47 | 84 | 41 | 30 | 24 | 5 | 1 | 141 | 74 |
| St. Norbert * | 18 | 15 | 3 | 0 | 3 | 0 | 0 | 42 | 68 | 30 | 31 | 24 | 6 | 1 | 126 | 65 |
| Trine | 18 | 12 | 4 | 2 | 0 | 0 | 2 | 40 | 63 | 38 | 30 | 21 | 7 | 2 | 105 | 63 |
| Adrian | 18 | 10 | 7 | 1 | 2 | 1 | 0 | 30 | 69 | 56 | 29 | 18 | 10 | 1 | 109 | 85 |
| MSOE | 18 | 7 | 8 | 3 | 0 | 0 | 1 | 25 | 49 | 50 | 27 | 13 | 10 | 4 | 75 | 66 |
| Marian | 18 | 6 | 11 | 1 | 1 | 2 | 1 | 21 | 51 | 60 | 27 | 9 | 17 | 1 | 70 | 94 |
| Concordia (WI) | 18 | 7 | 11 | 0 | 1 | 0 | 0 | 20 | 38 | 67 | 27 | 12 | 14 | 1 | 69 | 98 |
| Lawrence | 18 | 6 | 11 | 1 | 1 | 1 | 1 | 20 | 42 | 59 | 27 | 7 | 17 | 2 | 54 | 87 |
| Lake Forest | 18 | 5 | 12 | 1 | 1 | 2 | 0 | 17 | 49 | 71 | 25 | 9 | 15 | 1 | 73 | 93 |
| Dubuque | 18 | 1 | 15 | 2 | 1 | 4 | 0 | 8 | 37 | 77 | 25 | 1 | 21 | 3 | 47 | 106 |
Championship: March 8 † indicates conference regular season champion * indicates conference tournament champion

2024–25 State University of New York Athletic Conference ice hockey standings
| | Conference | | | | | | | | Overall | | | | | |
| | GP | W | L | T | OTL | PTS | GF | GA | GP | W | L | T | GF | GA |
|---|---|---|---|---|---|---|---|---|---|---|---|---|---|---|
| Cortland State † | 14 | 12 | 2 | 0 | 0 | 24 | 56 | 27 | 26 | 19 | 7 | 0 | 111 | 68 |
| Oswego State * | 14 | 9 | 4 | 1 | 1 | 20 | 59 | 28 | 28 | 16 | 9 | 3 | 119 | 65 |
| Buffalo State | 14 | 9 | 5 | 0 | 1 | 19 | 43 | 35 | 27 | 16 | 11 | 0 | 91 | 83 |
| Plattsburgh State | 14 | 8 | 6 | 0 | 0 | 16 | 47 | 38 | 28 | 16 | 11 | 1 | 92 | 77 |
| Potsdam State | 14 | 6 | 7 | 1 | 0 | 13 | 31 | 36 | 26 | 8 | 14 | 4 | 51 | 69 |
| Canton State | 14 | 6 | 8 | 0 | 1 | 13 | 38 | 44 | 26 | 9 | 16 | 1 | 70 | 91 |
| Fredonia State | 14 | 5 | 9 | 0 | 1 | 11 | 42 | 44 | 25 | 7 | 18 | 0 | 61 | 85 |
| Morrisville State | 14 | 0 | 14 | 0 | 1 | 1 | 19 | 83 | 25 | 3 | 22 | 0 | 43 | 130 |
Championship: March 8 † indicates conference regular season champion * indicates conference tournament champions

2024–25 United Collegiate Hockey Conference standings
| | Conference record | | | | | | | | | | Overall record | | | | | |
| | GP | W | L | T | OW | OL | SW | PTS | GF | GA | GP | W | L | T | GF | GA |
|---|---|---|---|---|---|---|---|---|---|---|---|---|---|---|---|---|
| Utica † | 20 | 16 | 2 | 2 | 0 | 0 | 1 | 51 | 84 | 44 | 31 | 24 | 5 | 2 | 132 | 74 |
| Geneseo State * | 20 | 16 | 3 | 1 | 2 | 1 | 0 | 48 | 97 | 54 | 30 | 24 | 5 | 1 | 143 | 78 |
| Manhattanville | 20 | 8 | 11 | 1 | 1 | 0 | 1 | 25 | 58 | 58 | 27 | 10 | 16 | 1 | 76 | 85 |
| Chatham | 20 | 8 | 10 | 2 | 4 | 0 | 2 | 24 | 62 | 81 | 27 | 10 | 15 | 2 | 77 | 107 |
| Nazareth | 20 | 4 | 14 | 2 | 0 | 5 | 1 | 20 | 53 | 81 | 26 | 8 | 16 | 2 | 73 | 98 |
| Brockport State | 20 | 4 | 16 | 0 | 1 | 1 | 0 | 12 | 44 | 80 | 26 | 6 | 18 | 2 | 60 | 98 |
Championship: March 8 † indicates conference regular season champion * indicates conference tournament champions

2024–25 Wisconsin Intercollegiate Athletic Conference ice hockey standings
| | Conference | | | | | | | | | | Overall | | | | | |
| | GP | W | L | T | OTW | OTL | SOW | PTS | GF | GA | GP | W | L | T | GF | GA |
|---|---|---|---|---|---|---|---|---|---|---|---|---|---|---|---|---|
| Wisconsin–Superior † | 15 | 11 | 2 | 2 | 3 | 0 | 1 | 33 | 54 | 24 | 27 | 19 | 5 | 3 | 90 | 42 |
| Wisconsin–Stevens Point | 15 | 10 | 3 | 2 | 1 | 0 | 1 | 32 | 60 | 28 | 27 | 19 | 6 | 2 | 111 | 66 |
| Wisconsin–Eau Claire * | 15 | 8 | 7 | 0 | 0 | 2 | 0 | 26 | 45 | 35 | 31 | 14 | 16 | 1 | 85 | 77 |
| Wisconsin–River Falls | 15 | 8 | 6 | 1 | 2 | 2 | 1 | 26 | 49 | 42 | 30 | 17 | 12 | 1 | 92 | 77 |
| Wisconsin–Stout | 15 | 5 | 9 | 1 | 2 | 4 | 0 | 18 | 42 | 43 | 27 | 12 | 13 | 2 | 84 | 70 |
| Northland | 15 | 0 | 15 | 0 | 0 | 0 | 0 | 0 | 12 | 90 | 27 | 1 | 26 | 0 | 26 | 147 |
Championship: March 8 † indicates conference regular season champion * indicates conference tournament champion

Note: Mini-games are not included in standings

== NCAA Percentage Index ==
The NCAA Percentage Index (NPI) are a statistical tool designed to approximate the process by which the NCAA selection committee decides which teams get at-large bids to the 13-team NCAA tournament.

The NCAA committee began using the NPI for Division III ice hockey in 2024–25, having previously used a similar metric called the PairWise Rankings (PWR). The PWR remained in use for the Division I level.

The NCAA Percentage Index is the tool used to select teams for the national collegiate ice hockey tournament for Men's and Women's Division III. Only results from games between Division III teams are used. The contribution of each individual game is weighted by a factor of 1.1 for a road win or home loss and 0.9 for a home win or road loss. Factors involved are 1) the team's weighted winning percentage; 2) the weighted average percentage of the team's opponents NPI;

A team's record is based only on games against other Division III hockey schools which are eligible for the NCAA Tournament.

NCAA Division I Men's Hockey PairWise Rankings
| Rank | Team | NPI | SOS | Conference |
|---|---|---|---|---|
| 1 | Curry | 62.361* | 51.532 | CNE |
| 2 | Hobart | 62.120* | 49.621 | NEHC |
| 3 | Aurora | 59.628 | 51.108 | NCHA |
| 4 | Utica | 59.582* | 51.108 | UCHC |
| 5 | St. Norbert | 58.961* | 52.172 | NCHA |
| 6 | Geneseo State | 58.879 | 50.807 | UCHC |
| 7 | Trine | 57.961* | 51.263 | NCHA |
| 8 | University of New England | 57.258 | 51.758 | CNE |
| 9 | Hamilton | 57.070 | 50.758 | NESCAC |
| 10 | Adrian | 56.308 | 50.324 | NCHA |
| 11 | Wisconsin–Stevens Point | 56.100* | 50.324 | WIAC |
| 12 | Endicott | 55.684 | 51.164 | CNE |
| 13 | Trinity | 55.345 | 51.387 | NESCAC |
| 14 | Cortland State | 55.291* | 49.977 | SUNYAC |
| 15 | Wisconsin–Superior | 55.257* | 50.142 | WIAC |
| 16 | Oswego State | 54.747* | 50.354 | SUNYAC |
| 17 | Plymouth State | 53.862 | 48.233 | MASCAC |
| 18 | Stevenson | 53.703 | 48.248 | MAC |
| 19 | MSOE | 53.699 | 52.039 | NCHA |
| 20 | Wilkes | 53.513 | 48.691 | MAC |
| 21 | Salem State | 53.158 | 48.037 | MASCAC |
| 22 | Colby | 53.150 | 50.928 | NESCAC |
| 23 | Norwich | 53.092 | 51.424 | NEHC |
| 24 | Wisconsin–River Falls | 52.703 | 50.497 | WIAC |
| 25 | Babson | 52.629 | 50.717 | NEHC |
| 26 | Anna Maria | 52.547 | 47.618 | MASCAC |
| 27 | St. Olaf | 52.185 | 50.459 | MIAC |
| 28 | Buffalo State | 52.165 | 49.572 | SUNYAC |
| 29 | Suffolk | 52.115 | 51.166 | CNE |
| 30 | Neumann | 51.970 | 47.007 | MAC |
| 31 | Gustavus Adolphus | 51.964 | 48.643 | MIAC |
| 32 | Bethel | 51.683 | 50.151 | MIAC |
| 33 | Middlebury | 51.619 | 51.445 | NESCAC |
| 34 | Salve Regina | 51.323 | 50.011 | NEHC |
| 35 | Plattsburgh State | 51.210 | 49.374 | SUNYAC |
| 36 | Tufts | 51.114 | 50.964 | NESCAC |
| 37 | Skidmore | 51.084 | 50.816 | NEHC |
| 38 | Wisconsin–Stout | 50.829 | 50.719 | WIAC |
| 39 | Wisconsin–Eau Claire | 50.804 | 50.860 | WIAC |
| 40 | Concordia (WI) | 50.626 | 51.771 | NCHA |
| 41 | St. Scholastica | 50.287 | 49.622 | MIAC |
| 42 | Amherst | 50.258 | 51.774 | NESCAC |
| 43 | Concordia (MN) | 50.241 | 50.011 | MIAC |
| 44 | Elmira | 49.977 | 50.686 | NEHC |
| 45 | Nazareth | 49.924 | 52.599 | UCHC |
| 46 | Albertus Magnus | 49.904 | 51.140 | NEHC |
| 47 | Manhattanville | 49.685 | 52.848 | UCHC |
| 48 | Lake Forest | 49.333 | 52.179 | NCHA |
| 49 | Fitchburg State | 49.316 | 47.810 | MASCAC |
| 50 | New England College | 49.280 | 51.089 | NEHC |
| 51 | Bowdoin | 49.152 | 51.775 | NESCAC |
| 52 | Saint John's | 49.121 | 50.120 | MIAC |
| 53 | Williams | 49.097 | 51.736 | NESCAC |
| 54 | Nichols | 48.977 | 50.961 | CNE |
| 55 | Saint Mary's | 48.946 | 49.121 | MIAC |
| 56 | Chatham | 48.767 | 52.909 | UCHC |
| 57 | Connecticut College | 48.627 | 51.810 | NESCAC |
| 58 | Marian | 48.334 | 52.494 | NCHA |
| 59 | Massachusetts Boston | 48.229 | 51.310 | NEHC |
| 60 | Johnson & Wales | 48.063 | 51.428 | CNE |
| 61 | Alvernia | 48.009 | 48.256 | MAC |
| 62 | Keene State | 47.877 | 47.317 | Independent |
| 63 | Massachusetts Dartmouth | 47.535 | 47.937 | MASCAC |
| 64 | Arcadia | 47.368 | 47.872 | MAC |
| 65 | Wesleyan | 47.360 | 51.731 | NESCAC |
| 66 | Wentworth | 47.003 | 52.308 | CNE |
| 67 | Lawrence | 46.897 | 52.135 | NCHA |
| 68 | Hamline | 46.810 | 51.272 | MIAC |
| 69 | Westfield State | 46.642 | 47.624 | MASCAC |
| 70 | Potsdam State | 46.285^{#} | 48.620 | SUNYAC |
| 71 | Augsburg | 46.213 | 50.261 | MIAC |
| 72 | King's | 46.030 | 47.916 | MAC |
| 73 | Fredonia State | 45.807^{#} | 50.587 | SUNYAC |
| 74 | Worcester State | 45.735 | 47.359 | MASCAC |
| 75 | Brockport State | 45.593 | 52.054 | UCHC |
| 76 | Canton State | 45.455 | 49.130 | SUNYAC |
| 77 | Southern Maine | 44.711^{#} | 51.387 | NEHC |
| 78 | Western New England | 44.471^{#} | 51.305 | CNE |
| 79 | Vermont State Castleton | 44.103^{#} | 50.660 | NEHC |
| 80 | MCLA | 43.682 | 48.127 | MASCAC |
| 81 | Dubuque | 42.892^{#} | 52.460 | NCHA |
| 82 | Lebanon Valley | 42.737 | 48.915 | MAC |
| 83 | Misericordia | 42.074 | 48.965 | MAC |
| 84 | Rivier | 41.669 | 48.200 | MASCAC |
| 85 | Framingham State | 40.151^{#} | 48.280 | MASCAC |
| 86 | Northland | 38.649^{#} | 51.681 | WIAC |
| 87 | Morrisville State | 38.057^{#} | 49.272 | SUNYAC |
* A team's RPI has been adjusted to remove negative effect from defeating a weak opponent. # A team's RPI has been adjusted to remove positive effect from losing to a strong opponent. Note: A team's record is based only on games against other Division III hockey schools which are eligible for the NCAA Tournament.

== 2025 NCAA Tournament ==
First round March 15
E5 | University of New England (8) | 2
E6 | Hamilton | 4
E3 | Utica (4) | 5
E9 | Fitchburg State | 1
W2 | St. Norbert (5) | 3
W4 | Gustavus Adolphus | 2
W3 | Trine (7) | 4
E7 | Oswego State | 1
W1 | Aurora (3) | 3
W5 | Wisconsin–Eau Claire | 2
E4 | Geneseo State (6) | 3
E8 | Stevenson | 1

Quarterfinals; March 20
E1 | Curry (1) | 4
E6 | Hamilton | 1
E3 | Utica (4) | 5
W2 | St. Norbert (5) | 3
E2 | Hobart (2) | 3*
W3 | Trine (7) | 2
W1 | Aurora (3) | 4
E4 | Geneseo State (6) | 7

Semifinals; March 28
E1 | Curry (1) | 1
E3 | Utica (4) | 2*
E2 | Hobart (2) | 2
E4 | Geneseo State (6) | 1

National Championship; March 30
E3 | Utica (4) | 1
E2 | Hobart (2) | 2*

Note: * denotes overtime period(s)

== Player stats ==
=== Scoring leaders ===
GP = Games played; G = Goals; A = Assists; Pts = Points; PIM = Penalty minutes

| Player | Class | Team | GP | G | A | Pts | PIM |
|---|---|---|---|---|---|---|---|
| Hassan Aki | Junior | Aurora | 30 | 13 | 39 | 52 | 20 |
| Logan Dombrowsky | Sophomore | St. Norbert | 31 | 17 | 34 | 51 | 14 |
| Landry Schmuck | Freshman | Aurora | 28 | 31 | 13 | 44 | 26 |
| Liam Fraser | Senior | St. Norbert | 31 | 21 | 23 | 44 | 14 |
| Landyn Greatorex | Junior | Salem State | 26 | 16 | 25 | 41 | 6 |
| Hunter Brackett | Senior | Saint Anselm | 30 | 20 | 20 | 40 | 21 |
| Tanner Daniels | Junior | Hobart | 31 | 18 | 22 | 40 | 12 |
| Ian Amsbaugh | Sophomore | Adrian | 29 | 13 | 27 | 40 | 36 |
| Nathan Berke | Graduate | Cortland State | 26 | 16 | 23 | 39 | 8 |
| Ryan Burke | Freshman | Oswego State | 28 | 11 | 27 | 38 | 20 |

=== Leading goaltenders ===
GP = Games played; Min = Minutes played; W = Wins; L = Losses; T = Ties; GA = Goals against; SO = Shutouts; SV% = Save percentage; GAA = Goals against average

| Player | Class | Team | GP | Min | W | L | T | GA | SO | SV% | GAA |
|---|---|---|---|---|---|---|---|---|---|---|---|
| Mavrick Goyer | Junior | Hobart | 13 | 784 | 12 | 0 | 1 | 11 | 7 | .956 | 0.84 |
| Damon Beaver | Junior | Hobart | 18 | 1107 | 17 | 1 | 0 | 21 | 5 | .952 | 1.14 |
| Charlie Archer | Senior | Hamilton | 22 | 1306 | 17 | 4 | 1 | 32 | 5 | .940 | 1.47 |
| Shane Soderwall | Sophomore | Curry | 28 | 1633 | 24 | 4 | 0 | 40 | 7 | .945 | 1.47 |
| Cristan Wong-Ramos | Senior | Trine | 12 | 608 | 8 | 2 | 0 | 16 | 3 | .915 | 1.58 |
| Jack Boschert | Sophomore | Wisconsin–Superior | 13 | 675 | 8 | 2 | 0 | 19 | 1 | .933 | 1.69 |
| Kobe Grant | Sophomore | Wisconsin–Superior | 10 | 571 | 6 | 2 | 2 | 17 | 1 | .943 | 1.79 |
| Ronnie Petrucci | Freshman | Trine | 11 | 848 | 6 | 3 | 1 | 16 | 1 | .925 | 1.80 |
| Diego D'Alessandro | Sophomore | King's | 11 | 597 | 6 | 3 | 1 | 18 | 2 | .945 | 1.81 |
| Stefan Carney | Freshman | University of New England | 14 | 788 | 9 | 3 | 1 | 24 | 3 | .926 | 1.83 |

== Awards ==
=== NCAA ===
| Award | | Recipient |
|---|---|---|
| Sid Watson Award | | Shane Soderwall, Curry |
| Edward Jeremiah Award | | Peter Roundy, Curry |
| Tournament Most Outstanding Player | | Kahlil Fontana, Hobart |
AHCA All-American Teams
| East First Team | Position | West First Team |
| Shane Soderwall, Curry | G | Jacob Mucitelli, Aurora |
| Austin Mourar, Hobart | D | Connor Kalthoff, St. Olaf |
| James Philpott, Hamilton | D | Juliano Santalucia, Aurora |
| Nate Berke, Cortland State | F | Hassan Aki, Aurora |
| Tanner Daniels, Hobart | F | Fletcher Anderson, Wisconsin–Stevens Point |
| Luke Tchor, Hamilton | F | Logan Dombrowsky, St. Norbert |
| East Second Team | Position | West Second Team |
| Damon Beaver, Hobart | G | Hunter Garvey, St. Norbert |
| Cole Jungwith, Wilkes | D | Dayton Deics, St. Norbert |
| Jack Karlsson, Stevenson | D | Wyatt Wurst, St. Scholastica |
| Luke Aquaro, Hobart | F | Tyler Braccini, Bethel |
| Nick Cyprian, Chatham | F | Liam Fraser, St. Norbert |
| Eelis Laaksonen, Curry | F | Landry Schmuck, Aurora |
| Peter Morgan, Geneseo State | F | |
| East Third Team | Position | |
| Charlie Archer, Hamilton | G | |
| Sean Melso, Geneseo State | D | |
| Kevin Weaver-Vitale, Plattsburgh State | D | |
| Ryan Burke, Oswego State | F | |
| Landyn Greatorex, Salem State | F | |
| Dominic Murphy, University of New England | F | |

== See also ==
- 2024–25 NCAA Division I men's ice hockey season
- 2024–25 NCAA Division II men's ice hockey season
