= 2024–25 NCAA Division II men's ice hockey season =

- Duration: October 25, 2024– March 1, 2025
- NCAA tournament: 2025

The 2024–25 NCAA Division II men's ice hockey season began on October 25, 2024, and concluded on March 1, 2025. This was the 43rd season of second-tier college ice hockey.

== Regular season ==
=== Season tournaments ===
| Tournament | Dates | Teams | Champion |
|---|---|---|---|
| Buffalo State Tournament | November 1–2 | 4 | Saint Anselm |
| Western Massachusetts Invitational | November 1–2 | 4 | Westfield State |
| Worcester City Cup | November 1, 3 | 4 | Anna Maria |
| Bowdoin/Colby Tournament | November 30–December 1 | 4 | Colby |

=== Standings ===
2024–25 Northeast-10 Conference ice hockey standings
| | Conference | | | | | | | | | Overall | | | | | |
| | GP | W | L | T | OTW | OTL | PTS | GF | GA | GP | W | L | T | GF | GA |
|---|---|---|---|---|---|---|---|---|---|---|---|---|---|---|---|
| Saint Anselm † | 20 | 16 | 3 | 1 | 0 | 1 | 50 | 91 | 45 | 30 | 18 | 10 | 2 | 115 | 103 |
| Saint Michael's * | 20 | 12 | 8 | 0 | 1 | 0 | 35 | 63 | 51 | 31 | 18 | 11 | 2 | 95 | 75 |
| Southern New Hampshire | 20 | 10 | 8 | 2 | 1 | 0 | 31 | 54 | 56 | 29 | 12 | 15 | 2 | 69 | 88 |
| Assumption | 20 | 9 | 11 | 0 | 1 | 2 | 28 | 56 | 62 | 32 | 13 | 19 | 0 | 89 | 109 |
| Post | 20 | 9 | 11 | 0 | 1 | 1 | 27 | 44 | 55 | 27 | 11 | 16 | 0 | 54 | 74 |
| Franklin Pierce | 20 | 2 | 17 | 1 | 0 | 0 | 7 | 47 | 86 | 29 | 2 | 25 | 2 | 63 | 124 |
Championship: March 1 † indicates conference regular season champion * indicates conference tournament champion

== See also ==
- 2024–25 NCAA Division I men's ice hockey season
- 2024–25 NCAA Division III men's ice hockey season
