= UCHC men's tournament =

United Collegiate Hockey Conference men's tournament
- United Collegiate Hockey Conference
- Sport: Ice hockey
- Conference: United Collegiate Hockey Conference
- Format: Single-elimination
- Played: 2018–Present

== History ==
The United Collegiate Hockey Conference men's ice hockey tournament began in 2018 with six of nine teams qualifying for the postseason. The received an automatic bid into the NCAA Tournament beginning in 2019.

== 2018 ==
Seed	School	Conference Record	Seed	School	Conference Record
1	Utica	12–4–0	4	Manhattanville	9–5–2
2	Stevenson	9–3–4	5	Elmira	8–5–3
3	Lebanon Valley	10–4–2	6	Neumann	8–6–2

Quarterfinals; February 21
3	Lebanon Valley	1
6	Neumann	3
4	Manhattanville	3
5	Elmira	4

Semifinals; February 24
1	Utica	5
6	Neumann	2
2	Stevenson	3
5	Elmira	5

Championship; March 3
1	Utica	8
5	Elmira	3

Note: * denotes overtime period(s)

== 2019 ==
Seed	School	Conference Record	Seed	School	Conference Record
1	Utica	14–3–1	4	Wilkes	11–5–2
2	Elmira	12–4–2	5	Nazareth	8–5–5
3	Manhattanville	11–4–3	6	Lebanon Valley	7–9–2

Quarterfinals; February 19
3	Manhattanville	5
6	Lebanon Valley	2
4	Wilkes	2
5	Nazareth	5

Semifinals; February 22–24
1	Utica	2	3*	-
5	Nazareth	1	2	-
2	Elmira	2*	2*	1
3	Manhattanville	2	2	2

Championship; March 2-3
1	Manhattanville	2	4	2
2	Utica	5	3	1

Note: * denotes overtime period(s)
Note: Mini-games in italics

== 2020 ==
Seed	School	Conference Record	Seed	School	Conference Record
1	Utica	15–2–1	4	Elmira	13–5–0
2	Wilkes	14–4–0	5	Nazareth	8–9–1
3	Stevenson	13–4–1	6	Neumann	8–10–0

Quarterfinals; February 25–26
3	Stevenson	8
6	Neumann	4
4	Elmira	2
5	Nazareth	5

Semifinals; February 28–March 1
1	Utica	5	3	-
5	Nazareth	2	2	-
2	Wilkes	7	2	2*
3	Stevenson	5	3	1

Championship; March 6–7
1	Utica	4	6	-
2	Wilkes	0	2	-

Note: * denotes overtime period(s)
Note: Mini-games in italics

== 2021 ==
Seed	School	Conference Record	Seed	School	Conference Record
1	Utica	7–1–0–0–0–0	5	Chatham	5–5–0–0–1–0
2	Stevenson	7–1–1–0–0–1	6	Neumann	1–5–2–0–0–0
3	Wilkes	6–3–0–1–1–0	7	Nazareth	0–10–0–0–0–0
4	Elmira	6–3–1–1–0–1	8	Manhattanville	0–3–0–0–0–0

The 6th- and 7th-seeded teams were switched to reduce travel distances.

Quarterfinals; March 31–April 1
1	Utica	9
8	Manhattanville	0
2	Stevenson	3
6	Neumann	2
3	Wilkes	3*
7	Nazareth	2
4	Elmira	6
5	Chatham	0

Semifinals; April 2
1	Utica	1
5	Elmira	2***
2	Stevenson	4
3	Wilkes	1

Championship; April 5
5	Elmira	3
2	Stevenson	0

Note: * denotes overtime period(s)

== 2022 ==
Seed	School	Conference Record	Seed	School	Conference Record
1	Utica	17–0–1–0–0–1	5	Nazareth	8–9–1–0–1–0
2	Wilkes	15–2–1–1–1–0	6	Manhattanville	6–9–3–2–0–3
3	Stevenson	14–4–0–5–0–0	7	Neumann	5–12–1–1–3–1
4	Chatham	8–8–2–1–2–0	8	Lebanon Valley	5–12–1–1–3–0

Quarterfinals; February 22–23
1	Utica	11
8	Lebanon Valley	1
2	Wilkes	3
7	Neumann	4
3	Stevenson	1
6	Manhattanville	4
4	Chatham	4
5	Nazareth	2

Semifinals; February 26
1	Utica	4
6	Manhattanville	0
2	Wilkes	5
4	Chatham	1

Championship; March 5
1	Utica	7
2	Wilkes	4

Note: * denotes overtime period(s)

== 2023 ==
Seed	School	Conference Record	Seed	School	Conference Record
1	Utica	20–0–0–2–0–0	5	Wilkes	11–7–2–4–3–0
2	Nazareth	14–5–1–1–0–1	6	Chatham	11–6–3–3–0–1
3	Stevenson	12–6–2–1–4–2	7	Alvernia	6–13–1–1–2–1
4	Manhattanville	12–7–1–1–1–0	8	Arcadia	5–12–3–0–0–1

Quarterfinals; February 22
1	Utica	5
8	Arcadia	2
2	Nazareth	5
7	Alvernia	1
3	Stevenson	6
6	Chatham	3
4	Manhattanville	4
5	Wilkes	1

Semifinals; February 25
1	Utica	11
4	Manhattanville	0
2	Nazareth	4
4	Stevenson	2

Championship; March 4
1	Utica	5
2	Nazareth	3

Note: * denotes overtime period(s)

== 2024 ==
Seed	School	Conference Record	Seed	School	Conference Record
1	Utica	19–0–1–0–0–0	5	Manhattanville	9–11–0–0–2–0
2	Stevenson	15–4–1–0–1–1	6	Chatham	8–12–0–2–2–0
3	Wilkes	15–5–0–3–0–0	7	King's	8–12–0–1–0–0
4	Alvernia	10–9–1–1–0–0	8	Nazareth	5–13–2–0–2–2

Quarterfinals; February 21
1	Utica	3
8	Nazareth	0
2	Stevenson	5
7	King's	1
3	Wilkes	5
6	Chatham	1
4	Alvernia	6
5	Manhattanville	1

Semifinals; February 24
1	Utica	4
4	Alvernia	0
2	Stevenson	4*
4	Wilkes	3

Championship; March 2
1	Utica	3
2	Stevenson	2

Note: * denotes overtime period(s)

== 2025 ==
Seed	School	Conference Record	Seed	School	Conference Record
1	Utica	16–2–2–0–0–1	4	Chatham	8–10–2–4–0–2
2	Geneseo State	16–3–1–2–1–0	5	Nazareth	4–14–2–0–5–1
3	Manhattanville	8–11–1–1–1–0	6	Brockport State	4–16–0–1–1–0

Quarterfinals; February 26
3	Manhattanville	4
6	Brockport State	1
4	Chatham	3
5	Nazareth	0

Semifinals; March 1
1	Utica	9
4	Chatham	0
2	Geneseo State	5
3	Manhattanville	2

Championship; March 8
1	Utica	3
2	Geneseo State	7

Note: * denotes overtime period(s)

== 2026 ==
Seed	School	Conference Record	Seed	School	Conference Record
1	Utica	13–2–1–0–1–1	4	Nazareth	9–6–1–1–0–0
2	Geneseo State	12–4–0–1–1–0	5	Albertus Magnus	8–8–0–0–0–0
3	Chatham	10–5–1–1–0–0	6	Brockport State	6–10–0–0–2–0

Quarterfinals; February 25
3	Chatham	4***
6	Brockport State	3
4	Nazareth	4**
5	Albertus Magnus	3

Semifinals; February 28
1	Utica	4
4	Nazareth	1
2	Geneseo State	7
3	Chatham	5

Championship; March 7
1	Utica	4
2	Geneseo State	1

Note: * denotes overtime period(s)

== Championships ==
School	Championships
Utica	6
Elmira	1
Geneseo State	1
Manhattanville	1

== See also ==
ECAC 2 Tournament
ECAC West Tournament
