= Little East Conference men's ice hockey tournament =

American college ice hockey tournament

- Conference hockey championship
- Sport: Ice hockey
- Conference: Little East Conference
- Format: Single-elimination
- Played: 2026–present

The Little East Conference men's ice hockey tournament is an annual Division III college ice hockey conference tournament. The inaugural tournament was held in 2026 in the first official season of play for the Little East ice hockey.

== History ==
When the Little East Conference announced that they would officially be sponsoring ice hockey for the 2025–26 season, the conference also began planning to hold a conference tournament that would be used to determine which league member would receive the league's automatic bid to the NCAA tournament. For the inaugural tournament, six of ten league members qualified with all three rounds being held as Single-elimination matches.

== 2026 ==
Seed	School	Conference Record	Seed	School	Conference Record
1	Norwich	13–2–3–0–1–3	4	Southern Maine	10–7–1–1–0–1
2	Babson	14–3–1–1–0–0	5	Massachusetts Boston	9–7–2–1–2–0
3	Plymouth State	11–6–1–1–0–0	6	Vermont State Castleton	9–8–1–1–2–0

Quarterfinals; February 25
3	Plymouth State	5
6	Vermont State Castleton	2
4	Southern Maine	2
5	Massachusetts Boston	3

Semifinals; February 28
1	Norwich	6
5	Massachusetts Boston	0
2	Babson	4
3	Plymouth State	0

Championship; March 7
1	Norwich	4
2	Babson	1

Note: * denotes overtime period(s)

== Championships ==
School	Championships
Norwich	1

== See also ==
- NEHC Men's Tournament
