= New England Hockey Conference =

American college athletic conference

- Association: NCAA
- Founded: 1984
- Folded: 2025
- Commissioner: Katie Boldvich
- Sports fielded: Ice hockey; men's: 10; women's: 9
- Division: Division III
- No. of teams: 12
- Headquarters: Marshfield, Massachusetts
- Region: New York and New England
- Website: http://www.nehockeyconference.com/

Locations

New England Hockey Conference (formerly the ECAC East) was a college athletic conference which operated in the northeastern United States. It participated in the NCAA's Division III as a hockey-only conference.

== History ==
The New England Hockey Conference began as ECAC East in 1984 when ECAC 2 was split in two and both new conferences dropped down to Division III. The conference was fairly stable for the first decade but began to grow in the mid 1990s. In 1998 four teams left to become Division I programs in the new MAAC conference. A year later, nine more teams split off to join their primary athletic conference, NESCAC, followed by the women's programs in 2001. Membership numbers held steady over the succeeding 15 years, though several teams came and went. In 2015 the conference rebranded itself as the New England Hockey Conference, but no internal changes occurred. Two years later 6 women's and 2 men's programs left to join a variety of conferences, dropping league membership to 11 schools, the lowest number in conference history.

=== Splintering and dissolution ===
In 2022, Johnson & Wales University announced that they would join Commonwealth Coast Conference as a full-member starting in 2024-25 and sponsor both men's ice hockey and women's ice hockey. In the summer of 2023, Keene State announced that they would begin sponsoring men's and women's ice hockey starting with the 2024–25 season. This gave the Little East Conference six member schools that supported men's ice hockey, the minimum number required for an automatic bid to the NCAA tournament. Shortly afterwards, the Little East announced that they would begin sponsoring men's ice hockey as a sport and begin play in the 2025-26 season. In early 2024, New England College was accepted by the Little East as an affiliate ice hockey member, enabling the conference to also support women's hockey. Less than a month later, two more NEHC teams announced that they would be joining the Little East as affiliate members and both Babson and Norwich would be leaving in 2025. The bleeding continued when, in April and May, Hobart, Skidmore and William Smith announced their move to the SUNYAC, while Albertus Magus (who had yet to play a game in the NEHC) and Elmira both announced that they would be leaving to join the UCHC, all in 2025. Salem State also announced that they will leave in 2025 to join their primary conference (MASCAC) and will also start to sponsor women's ice hockey the same year. The final remaining school, Salve Regina, would ultimately play as an independent for the 2025-26 season before joining the Conference of New England as an affiliate ice hockey member in 2026, bringing an end to the NEHC after 40 seasons.

=== Standings ===
From the time it formally split from ECAC 2 until 1992 all games played between members of ECAC East and ECAC West counted for conference standings. In 1992, after the ECAC West split into two conferences, ECAC East only counted games within their conference for the standings, but because a formal schedule was not yet in place all games between members were still counted. For the 1993–94 season ECAC East had its first official conference schedule with all 18 teams playing each other once. Teams could schedule additional inter-conference games but only one would count in the standings. In 1999, when 9 teams left to form the ice hockey division of the NESCAC, the two conferences continued to count games between one another in their respective standings. This arrangement continued even after the addition of more programs.

== Final members ==
In the NEHC's final season, there were 14 member schools; the men's and women's divisions each had eleven members.

New England Hockey Conference
Locations of NEHC members, 2021–2022 men's only member, women's only member men's and women's member

Institution	Location	Founded	Joined	Enrollment	Nickname	Primary conference	Current hockey conference	Colors	(M)	(W)
Albertus Magnus College	New Haven, Connecticut	1925	2024	1,961	Falcons	Great Northeast Athletic Conference	United Collegiate Hockey Conference		✓	✓
Babson College	Wellesley, Massachusetts	1919	1984	3,340	Beavers	NEWMAC	Little East Conference		✓	
Elmira College	Elmira, New York	1855	2021	768	Soaring Eagles	Empire 8	United Collegiate Hockey Conference		✓	✓
Hobart College	Geneva, New York	1822	2017	2,337	Statesmen	Liberty League	State University of New York Athletic Conference		✓	(Note: Joint universities)
University of Massachusetts Boston	Dorchester, Massachusetts	1964	1984	16,259	Beacons	Little East Conference			✓	✓
New England College	Henniker, New Hampshire	1946	1984	4,327	Pilgrims	Great Northeast Athletic Conference	Little East Conference		✓	✓
Norwich University	Northfield, Vermont	1819	1984	2,000	Cadets	Great Northeast Athletic Conference	Little East Conference		✓	✓
Plymouth State University	Plymouth, New Hampshire	1871	2015	4,491	Panthers	Little East Conference				✓
Salem State University	Salem, Massachusetts	1854	2018	7,242	Vikings	Massachusetts State Collegiate Athletic Conference				✓
Salve Regina University	Newport, Rhode Island	1934	2024	2,600	Seahawks	New England Women's and Men's Athletic Conference	Conference of New England		✓	✓
Skidmore College	Saratoga Springs, New York	1903	1998	2,500	Thoroughbreds	Liberty League	State University of New York Athletic Conference		✓	
University of Southern Maine	Gorham, Maine	1878	1995	8,022	Huskies	Little East Conference			✓	✓
Vermont State University Castleton	Castleton, Vermont	1787	2004	2,399	Spartans	Little East Conference			✓	✓
William Smith College	Geneva, New York	1908	2021	2,229	Herons	Liberty League	State University of New York Athletic Conference			✓

== Former members ==
	Location	Athletic nickname	Colors	Founded	Joined (M)	Left (M)	Joined (W)	Left (W)	Current Conference^{†}	(M)	(W)
American International College	Springfield, Massachusetts	Yellow Jackets		1885	1984	1998	–	–	AHA (NCAA D-I)	✓	
Amherst College	Amherst, Massachusetts	Mammoths		1821	1992	1999	1995	2001	NESCAC	✓	✓
Bowdoin College	Brunswick, Maine	Polar Bears		1794	1984	1999	1984	2001	NESCAC	✓	✓
Colby College	Waterville, Maine	Mules		1813	1984	1999	–	–	NESCAC	✓	
University of Connecticut	Storrs, Connecticut	Huskies		1881	1984	1998	–	–	Hockey East (NCAA D-I)	✓	
Connecticut College	New London, Connecticut	Camels		1794	1991	1999	1997	2001	NESCAC	✓	✓
Franklin Pierce University	Rindge, New Hampshire	Ravens		1962	–	–	2014	2017	NEWHA (NCAA D-I)		✓
Hamilton College	Clinton, New York	Continentals		1793	1992	1999	1996	2001	NESCAC	✓	✓
College of the Holy Cross	Worcester, Massachusetts	Crusaders		1843	1984	1998	1999	2017	AHA (NCAA D-I)	✓	✓
Johnson & Wales University	Providence, Rhode Island	Wildcats		1914	2018	2024	2018	2024	CNE	✓	✓
Manhattanville College	Purchase, New York	Valiants		1815	–	–	1999	2017	UCHC		✓
Massachusetts College of Liberal Arts	North Adams, Massachusetts	Trailblazers		1894	1984	2003	–	–	MASCAC	✓	
Massachusetts Institute of Technology	Cambridge, Massachusetts	Engineers		1861	–	–	1984	2009	Dropped Program		✓
Merrimack College	North Andover, Massachusetts	Warriors		1947	1984	1989	–	–	Hockey East (NCAA D-I)	✓	
Middlebury College	Middlebury, Vermont	Panthers		1800	1984	1999	1984	2001	NESCAC	✓	✓
University of New England	Biddeford, Maine	Nor'easters		1831	2009	2016	2009	2018	CNE	✓	✓
Nichols College	Dudley, Massachusetts	Bison		1815	–	–	2008	2017	CNE		✓
Rensselaer Polytechnic Institute	Troy, New York	Engineers		1824	–	–	1995	2005	ECAC Hockey (NCAA D-I)		✓
Rochester Institute of Technology	Henrietta, New York	Tigers		1829	–	–	1984	2007	CHA (NCAA D-I)		✓
Saint Anselm College	Goffstown, New Hampshire	Hawks		1889	1984	2017	2004	2017	Northeast–10 (men) (NCAA D-II); NEWHA (women) (NCAA D-I)	✓	✓
Saint Michael's College	Colchester, Vermont	Purple Knights		1904	2001	2017	2001	2017	Northeast–10 (men) (NCAA D-II); NEWHA (women) (NCAA D-I)	✓	✓
Salem State University	Salem, Massachusetts	Vikings		1854	1984	2009	–	–	MASCAC	✓	
Suffolk University	Boston, Massachusetts	Rams		1906	2018	2021	2018	2021	CNE	✓	✓
Trinity College	Hartford, Connecticut	Bantams		1823	1991	1999	1998	2001	NESCAC	✓	✓
Union College	Schenectady, New York	Dutchwomen		1795	–	–	1999	2003	ECAC Hockey (NCAA D-I)		✓
Wesleyan University	Middletown, Connecticut	Cardinals		1831	1995	1999	1996	2001	NESCAC	✓	✓
Westfield State University	Westfield, Massachusetts	Owls		1874	1984	1989	–	–	MASCAC	✓	
Williams College	Williamstown, Massachusetts	Ephs		1793	1984	1999	1994	2001	NESCAC	✓	✓

† (as of March 2025)

== Membership timeline ==
Men Women Both

== See also ==
- New England Women's Hockey Alliance
