= Utica Pioneers =

- University: Utica University
- Nickname: Pioneers
- NCAA: Division III
- Conference: Empire 8; United Collegiate Hockey Conference; Collegiate Water Polo Association
- Athletic director: David Fontaine
- Location: Utica, New York
- Varsity teams: 27
- Football stadium: Charles A. Gaetano Stadium
- Arena: Harold T. Clark Athletic Center
- Baseball stadium: Utica University Baseball Field
- Other venues: Adirondack Bank Center Utica University Nexus Center
- Colors: Navy and orange
- Website: uticapioneers.com

The Utica Pioneers are composed of 27 teams representing Utica University in intercollegiate athletics, including men and women's basketball, cross country, golf, ice hockey, lacrosse, soccer, swimming & diving, tennis, track and field, and wrestling. Men's sports include baseball and football. Women's sports include field hockey, gymnastics, softball, volleyball, and water polo. The Pioneers compete in the NCAA Division III and are members of the Empire 8 for all sports except men's and women's ice hockey, and women's water polo. The men's and women's ice hockey teams compete as members of the United Collegiate Hockey Conference, and the women's water polo team competes as a member of the Collegiate Water Polo Association.

== Teams ==
Men's	Women's
Baseball	Basketball
Basketball	Cross Country
Cross Country	Field Hockey
Football	Golf
Golf	Gymnastics
Ice Hockey	Ice Hockey
Lacrosse	Lacrosse
Soccer	Soccer
Tennis	Softball
Track and Field	Tennis
Wrestling	Track and Field
	Volleyball
	Wrestling

== History ==
Utica University offers 29 NCAA Division III intercollegiate sports. Teams are known as the Pioneers and compete in the Empire 8 along with Elmira College, Alfred University, Hartwick College, Nazareth University, Stevens Institute of Technology, and St. John Fisher University. The men's and women's hockey teams compete in the United Collegiate Hockey Conference athletic conference. The women's water polo team competes in the Collegiate Water Polo Association's Northern Division.

The student body's overall interest in athletics was significantly bolstered by the addition of football and ice hockey teams in 2001, and the addition of men's/women's wrestling and women's gymnastics beginning in 2023-24.

The football, field hockey, soccer and lacrosse teams play in Charles A. Gaetano Stadium. The men's ice hockey team competes at the Adirondack Bank Center and the women's team competes in the neighboring Utica U Nexus Center. The Aud, as it is commonly called, was built in 1959 and provides seating for 3,850 fans. The men's hockey team led the nation in Division III home attendance in the 2006–07 and 2007–08 seasons. The basketball teams play on campus at the Harold Thomas Clark Jr. Athletic Center, which also has racquetball courts.

In November 2007, the Utica University football team set an NCAA football record, the highest combined score (142 points) by two teams, in their 72–70 loss to Hartwick in four overtimes. In this game, Utica also set the NCAA record for most points scored (70) by the losing team.

Utica University has a women's basketball team that won the Empire 8 championship in 2008. In 2009, they tied with Ithaca as the regular season Empire 8 champions. In 2010, they regained their Empire 8 championship title.

In 2012-13, the Utica University men's hockey team would set a program record 21 wins and win the ECAC regular season title on its way to its first-ever Frozen Four appearance in a loss to UW-Eau Clair in Lake Placid's Herb Brooks arena.
