= United Collegiate Hockey Conference =

Athletic conference

- Association: NCAA
- Founded: 2016
- Commissioner: Chuck Mitrano (since 2016)
- Sports fielded: Ice hockey; men's: 9 teams; women's: 8 teams
- Division: Division III
- Headquarters: Rochester, New York
- Region: Mid-Atlantic United States
- Website: theuchc.com

Locations
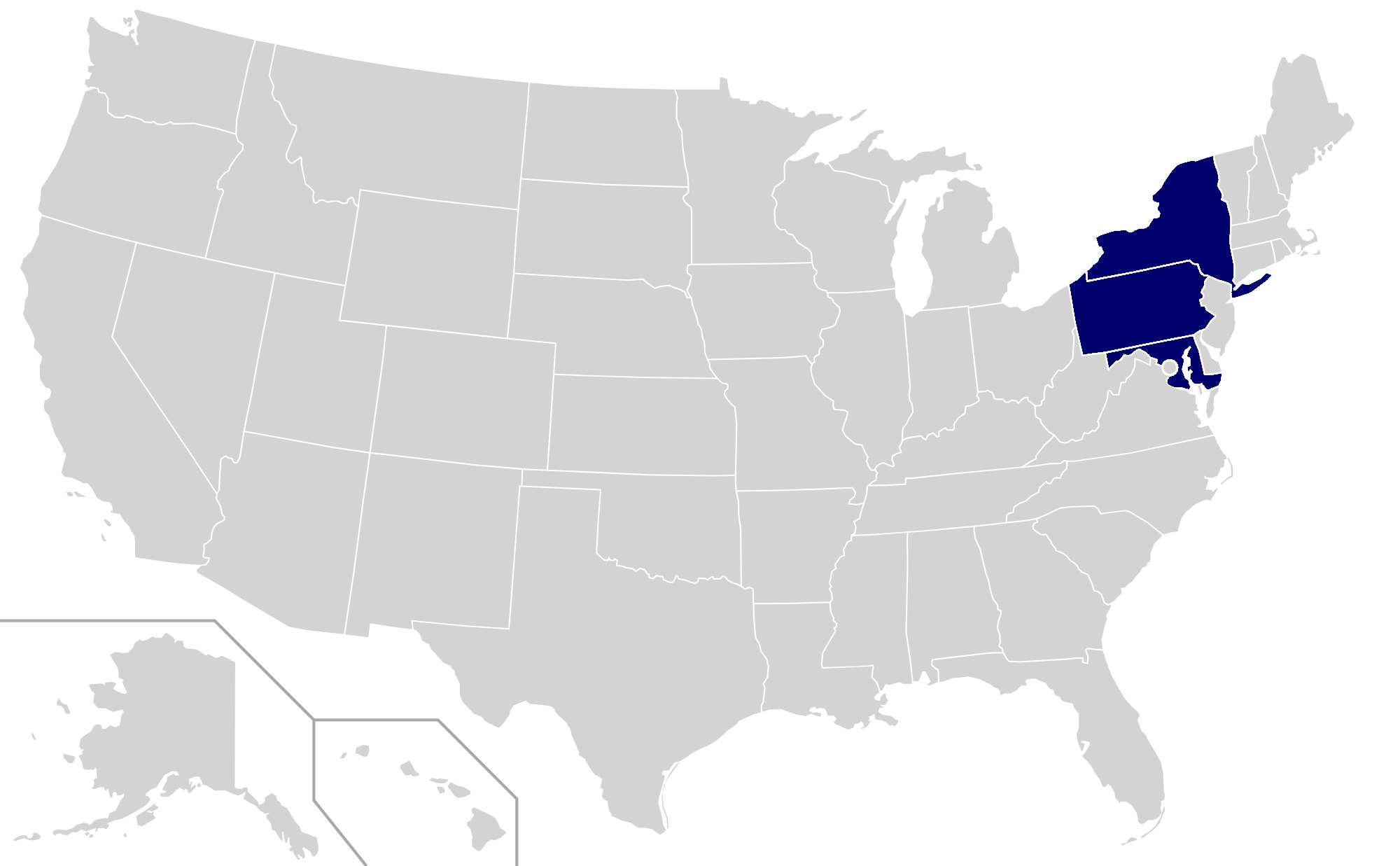

The United Collegiate Hockey Conference (UCHC) is a college athletic conference which operates in Maryland, New York, and Pennsylvania in the Mid-Atlantic United States. It participates in NCAA Division III as a hockey-only conference.

== History ==
The conference was announced in 2016 as an association of 10 schools and league play began for the 2017–18 academic year, with nine each playing in the men's and women's divisions. The majority of the member schools were previously members of the now-defunct ECAC West hockey conference. Wilkes University was also announced as a future member for both the men's and women's divisions for the start of the 2018–19 academic year, the same time when charter men's member Nazareth College began varsity women's play in the UCHC. The following season, Alvernia University joined for its first season of varsity women's play. In July 2021, Arcadia University new men's and women's programs were accepted into the league. A year later, Alvernia added its men's team to the conference lineup.

In 2023, the conference was split in two when Misericordia University began sponsoring men's ice hockey, allowing the Middle Atlantic Conferences to receive an automatic bid for the NCAA tournament and form a new ice hockey division. In September of that year, Brockport State and Geneseo State announced that their men's teams would be joining the UCHC for the 2024–25, bringing membership back up to eight teams. About a month later, Neumann and Wilkes also announced that they would be leaving the UCHC for MAC as well. This dropped membership back down to six teams, the minimum number of programs required for an at-large bid. A few months later, the conference added four more schools for the 2025 season with Albertus Magnus, Elmira and St. John Fisher each adding men's and women's hockey while Hilbert's women's team would join.

The league did not have an automatic bid to the NCAA Division III Men's Ice Hockey Championship or the NCAA Division III Women's Ice Hockey Championship for the 2017–18 season but the Men's league gained the bid for the 2018–19 season and the Women's league did for the 2019-20 season.

== Members schools ==
=== Current members ===
Locations of United Collegiate Hockey Conference members
men's and women's
men's only
women's only

School	Location	Nickname	Founded	Affiliation	Enrollment	Year Joined	Primary Conference	Colors	(M)	(W)
Albertus Magnus College	New Haven, Connecticut	Falcons	1925	Private	1,200	2025-26	GNAC		✓	✓
Chatham University	Pittsburgh, Pennsylvania	Cougars	1869	Private	2,300	2017-18	PAC		✓	✓
Elmira College	Elmira, New York	Soaring Eagles	1855	Private	1,170	2025-26 (Note: Elmira was previously a member of the UCHC from 2017 to 2021.)	Empire 8		✓	✓
Hilbert College	Hamburg, New York	Hawks	1957	Private	800	2025-26	AMCC		✗	✓
Manhattanville University	Purchase, New York	Valiants	1841	Private	2,700	2017-18	Skyline		✓	✓
Nazareth University	Pittsford, New York	Golden Flyers	1924	Private	2,800	2017-18 (men); 2018-19 (women)	Empire 8		✓	✓
St. John Fisher University	Pittsford, New York	Cardinals	1948	Private	2,700	2025-26	Empire 8		✓	✓
State University of New York at Brockport	Brockport, New York	Golden Eagles	1867	Public	7,924	2024-25	Empire 8		✓	✗
State University of New York at Geneseo	Geneseo, New York	Knights	1871	Public	4,910	2024-25	Empire 8		✓	✗
Utica University	Utica, New York	Pioneers	1946	Private	4,400	2017-18	Empire 8		✓	✓

=== Membership timeline ===
Men Women Both

=== Former members ===
School	Location	Nickname	Founded	Affiliation	Enrollment	Year Joined	Year Left	Current Conference	Colors
Alvernia University	Reading, Pennsylvania	Golden Wolves	1958	Private	2,872	2019-20 (women); 2022-23 (men)	2023-24	MAC	
Arcadia University	Glenside, Pennsylvania	Knights	1853	Private	2,473	2021-22	2023-24	MAC	
King's College	Wilkes-Barre, Pennsylvania	Monarchs	1946	Private/Catholic	2,300	2017-18	2023-24	MAC	
Lebanon Valley College	Annville, Pennsylvania	Flying Dutchmen	1866	Private/Methodist	1,750	2017-18	2023-24	MAC	
Neumann University	Aston, Pennsylvania	Knights	1965	Private/Catholic	3,000	2017-18	2023-24	MAC	
Stevenson University	Baltimore County, Maryland	Mustangs	1947	Private	3,700	2017-18	2023-24	MAC	
Wilkes University	Wilkes-Barre, Pennsylvania	Colonels	1933	Private	5,000	2018-19	2023-24	MAC	
William Smith College	Geneva, New York	Herons	1908	Private	2,229	2017-18	2021-22	SUNYAC	

== Champions ==
=== Men ===
Season	Regular season	Tournament
2017–18	Utica	Utica
2018–19	Utica	Manhattanville
2019–20	Utica	Utica
2020–21	Utica	Elmira
2021–22	Utica	Utica
2022–23	Utica	Utica
2023–24	Utica	Utica
2024–25	Utica	Geneseo
2025–26	Utica	Utica

=== Women ===
Season	Regular season	Tournament
2017–18	Elmira	Elmira
2018–19	Elmira	Elmira
2019–20	Elmira	Elmira
2020–21	Elmira	Elmira
2021–22	Nazareth	Nazareth
2022–23	Nazareth	Nazareth
2023–24	Nazareth	Nazareth
2024–25	Nazareth	Nazareth
2025–26	Nazareth	Elmira

== Arenas ==
School	Arena	Capacity
Chatham	Hunt Armory Ice Arena	n/a
Manhattanville	Playland Ice Casino	n/a
Elmira	Murray Athletic Center	3,200
Albertus Magnus	Ralph Walker Skating Rink	N/A
St John Fisher	Rochester Ice Arena	500
Nazareth	Tim Horton's Iceplex	2,000
SUNY Brockport	Wegmans Ice Arena	2,000
SUNY Geneseo	Wilson Ice Arena	2,100
Utica	Adirondack Bank Center	3,860
