= List of NCAA Division III men's Frozen Four appearances by team =

This is a list of NCAA Division III men's ice hockey tournament Frozen Four appearances by team.

== Total Frozen Four appearances ==
The following is a list of National Collegiate Athletic Association (NCAA) Division III college ice hockey teams that have qualified for the NCAA Division III Men's Ice Hockey Championship with teams listed by number of appearances as of 2025.

NCAA Men's Division I Ice Hockey Tournament
School	Frozen Four Appearances	Frozen Four Years	Wins	Losses	ties	Win%	Titles
Norwich	13	1997, 1999, 2000, 2002, 2003, 2004, 2008, 2010, 2011, 2012, 2013, 2017, 2019	11	10	0	.524	4
St. Norbert	12	2003, 2004, 2006, 2007, 2008, 2010, 2011, 2012, 2014, 2016, 2017, 2018	14	7	0	.667	5
Middlebury	11	1995, 1996, 1997, 1998, 1999, 2002, 2003, 2004, 2005, 2006, 2007	17	3	0	.850	8
Wisconsin–Stevens Point	11	1989, 1990, 1991, 1992, 1993, 1998, 2014, 2015, 2016, 2018, 2019	18	6	2	.731	6
Plattsburgh State	11	1985, 1986†, 1987†, 1990, 1992, 1993, 1998, 2000, 2001, 2002, 2004, 2008, 2010	9	12	2	.435	2
Wisconsin–Superior	9	1992, 1994, 1995, 1996, 1997, 1999, 2000, 2001, 2002	6	12	0	.333	1
Oswego State	8	1987, 2003, 2007, 2010, 2011, 2012, 2013, 2014	6	7	0	.462	1
Hobart	7	2006, 2009, 2019, 2023, 2024, 2025, 2026	7	4	0	.636	3
RIT	7	1984, 1985, 1986, 1989, 1996, 1999, 2001	8	7	1	.531	1
Wisconsin–River Falls	6	1988, 1993, 1994, 1995, 1996, 2001	9	6	0	.600	1
Adrian	6	2011, 2015, 2017, 2022, 2023, 2024	4	5	0	.444	1
Babson	5	1984, 1988, 1989, 1990, 1991	4	6	2	.417	1
Elmira	5	1988, 1991, 1993, 2006, 2008	4	8	0	.333	0
Geneseo State	5	2014, 2016, 2019, 2022, 2025	1	5	0	.167	0
Trinity	4	2005, 2015, 2017, 2024	4	3	0	.571	1
Bemidji State	4	1985, 1986, 1988, 1989	3	5	0	.375	1
Utica	3	2013, 2024, 2025	1	3	0	.250	0
Mankato State	3	1986, 1990, 1991	1	4	1	.250	0
Augsburg	3	1984, 1998, 2022	0	5	0	.000	0
Union	2	1984, 1985	2	2	0	.500	0
Fredonia State	2	1994, 1995	2	2	0	.500	0
St. Thomas	2	2000, 2005	2	2	0	.500	0
Salem State	2	1992, 1994	1	3	0	.250	0
Amherst	2	2012, 2015	0	2	0	.000	0
University of New England	2	2022, 2023	0	2	0	.000	0
Wisconsin–Stout	2	2009, 2026	0	2	0	.000	0
Neumann	1	2009	2	0	0	1.000	1
Wisconsin–Eau Claire	1	2013	2	0	0	1.000	1
Hamilton	1	2026	2	0	0	1.000	1
St. Cloud State	1	1987	1	1	0	.500	0
Saint John's	1	1997	1	1	0	.500	0
Gustavus Adolphus	1	2009	1	1	0	.500	0
Salve Regina	1	2018	1	1	0	.500	0
New England College	1	2005	0	1	0	.000	0
Manhattanville	1	2007	0	1	0	.000	0
Massachusetts–Boston	1	2016	0	1	0	.000	0
Colby	1	2018	0	1	0	.000	0
Endicott	1	2023	0	1	0	.000	0
Curry	1	2025	0	1	0	.000	0
Aurora	1	2026	0	1	0	.000	0

† = Appearance vacated by the NCAA.

== See also ==
- Frozen Four
