= 2017–18 NCAA Division III men's ice hockey season =

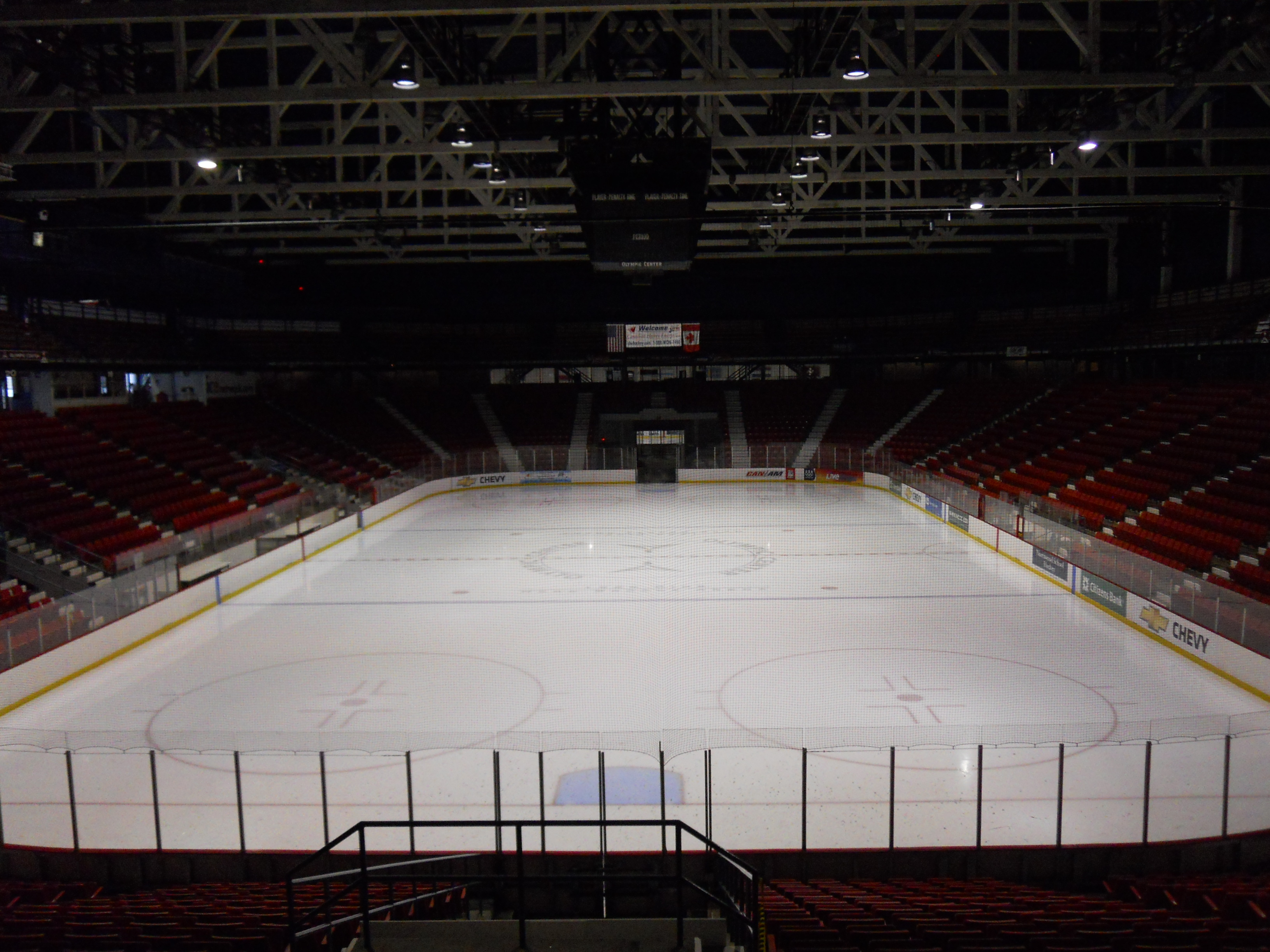
- The Herb Brooks Arena was the host of the 2018 Frozen Four
- Duration: October 21, 2017– March 24, 2018
- NCAA tournament: 2018
- National championship: Herb Brooks Arena; Lake Placid, New York
- NCAA champion: St. Norbert
- Sid Watson Award: Colin Larkin (Massachusetts–Boston)

The 2017–18 NCAA Division III men's ice hockey season began on October 21, 2017, and concluded on March 24, 2018. This was the 45th season of Division III college ice hockey.

The two Division II schools, (Saint Anselm and Saint Michael's) that had played in the New England Hockey Conference for years, formally left the league and began playing a full Northeast-10 Conference schedule.

As had been announced in 2016, seven members of ECAC West, the last remaining ECAC conference at the Division III level, left to form the United Collegiate Hockey Conference along with two new men's programs. The remaining school, Hobart, joined the NEHC.

== Regular season ==
=== Standings ===
2017–18 Commonwealth Coast Conference ice hockey standings
	Conference							Overall					
	GP	W	L	T	PTS	GF	GA	GP	W	L	T	GF	GA
Salve Regina †	18	14	2	2	30	80	33	30	22	6	2	123	61
Endicott	18	13	4	1	27	94	45	27	18	6	3	138	65
University of New England	18	11	4	3	25	92	69	29	20	6	3	141	99
Curry	18	11	6	1	23	67	60	26	17	8	1	102	80
Nichols *	18	9	6	3	21	57	51	30	18	9	3	110	84
Wentworth	18	7	8	3	17	51	54	26	9	14	3	68	90
Suffolk	18	6	10	2	14	49	62	25	9	13	3	69	89
Western New England	18	4	12	2	10	43	69	26	9	14	3	69	95
Johnson & Wales	18	3	14	1	7	43	77	25	5	19	1	55	103
Becker	18	3	15	0	6	40	96	24	5	18	1	64	120
Championship: March 3, 2018 † indicates conference regular season champion * indicates conference tournament champions

2017–18 NCAA Division III Independent ice hockey standings
	Overall record					
	GP	W	L	T	GF	GA
Bryn Athyn	22	9	12	1	67	74
Canton State	25	7	16	2	59	81

2017–18 Massachusetts State Collegiate Athletic Conference ice hockey standings
	Conference							Overall					
	GP	W	L	T	PTS	GF	GA	GP	W	L	T	GF	GA
Plymouth State †	18	15	2	1	31	88	39	26	19	5	2	110	56
Fitchburg State *	18	11	4	3	25	82	53	28	18	7	3	119	78
Worcester State	18	8	8	2	18	62	51	26	13	11	2	86	69
Massachusetts–Dartmouth	18	7	8	3	17	76	74	28	12	13	3	116	112
Westfield State	18	8	10	0	16	62	85	25	10	14	1	85	111
Salem State	18	6	9	3	15	50	47	27	10	12	5	79	84
Framingham State	18	2	16	0	4	30	101	25	3	20	2	47	130
Championship: March 3, 2018 † indicates conference regular season champion * indicates conference tournament champions

2017–18 Minnesota Intercollegiate Athletic Conference ice hockey standings
	Conference								Overall					
	GP	W	L	T	SW	PTS	GF	GA	GP	W	L	T	GF	GA
St. Thomas †	16	11	4	1	0	34	52	40	26	16	9	1	81	62
Saint John's	16	11	5	0	0	33	58	36	26	16	8	2	86	60
Augsburg *	16	10	6	0	0	30	64	41	29	19	10	0	103	72
Gustavus Adolphus	16	9	7	0	0	18	46	33	28	12	13	3	69	66
Concordia (MN)	16	7	8	1	1	23	50	57	26	10	13	3	71	83
Saint Mary's	16	6	7	3	1	22	42	53	25	9	12	4	70	87
St. Olaf	16	6	8	2	1	21	42	48	24	9	12	3	67	78
Hamline	16	4	10	2	0	14	49	60	25	9	14	2	74	89
Bethel	16	2	11	3	3	12	31	66	25	3	19	3	44	108
Championship: March 3, 2018 † indicates conference regular season champion * indicates conference tournament champion

2017–18 New England Hockey Conference standings
	Conference							Overall					
	GP	W	L	T	PTS	GF	GA	GP	W	L	T	GF	GA
Norwich †	18	13	3	2	28	60	36	28	19	7	2	90	57
Hobart *	18	12	3	3	27	74	34	29	18	6	5	109	55
Babson	18	12	4	2	26	67	44	27	15	9	3	85	66
Massachusetts–Boston	18	11	7	0	22	74	53	27	17	10	0	121	77
New England College	18	7	10	1	15	55	55	26	12	12	2	85	73
Skidmore	18	4	12	2	10	35	64	26	6	18	2	48	91
Southern Maine	18	3	12	3	9	27	64	26	3	19	4	37	97
Castleton	18	3	14	1	7	38	80	26	7	16	3	61	96
Championship: March 3, 2018 † indicates conference regular season champion * indicates conference tournament champion

2017–18 New England Small College Athletic Conference ice hockey standings
	Conference							Overall					
	GP	W	L	T	PTS	GF	GA	GP	W	L	T	GF	GA
Trinity †	18	14	3	1	29	56	31	27	19	6	2	87	48
Connecticut College	18	9	5	4	22	52	42	25	10	11	4	61	70
Amherst	18	8	5	5	21	49	41	25	11	9	5	63	60
Hamilton	18	9	6	3	21	44	36	25	15	7	3	69	42
Wesleyan	18	8	6	4	20	50	41	26	13	8	5	77	63
Colby *	18	9	7	2	20	57	43	30	17	11	2	101	72
Williams	18	9	8	1	19	48	45	26	14	11	1	75	70
Tufts	18	4	11	3	11	33	50	25	5	16	4	49	78
Bowdoin	18	5	13	0	10	40	65	24	8	16	0	52	77
Middlebury	18	2	13	3	7	18	53	24	4	17	3	33	75
Championship: March 4, 2018 † indicates conference regular season champion * indicates conference tournament champion

2017–18 Northern Collegiate Hockey Association standings
	Conference							Overall					
	GP	W	L	T	PTS	GF	GA	GP	W	L	T	GF	GA
North
St. Norbert *	18	15	3	0	30	86	29	32	27	4	1	126	47
Marian	18	12	6	0	24	62	42	29	20	8	1	93	57
St. Scholastica	18	9	8	1	19	48	52	27	15	11	1	79	72
Lawrence	18	8	9	1	17	51	59	27	10	15	2	72	90
Northland	18	6	10	2	14	46	55	25	9	13	3	66	75
Finlandia	18	0	17	1	1	25	92	25	1	23	1	34	117
South
Adrian †	18	17	1	0	34	92	26	30	24	6	0	131	54
Concordia (WI)	18	12	6	0	24	54	45	27	16	9	2	82	69
Lake Forest	18	10	6	2	22	55	38	28	15	11	2	86	72
MSOE	18	7	10	1	15	38	45	27	11	14	2	58	66
Aurora	18	4	12	2	10	41	67	25	5	15	5	56	95
Trine	18	2	14	2	6	36	84	25	6	17	2	54	96
Championship: March 3, 2018 † indicates conference regular season champion * indicates conference tournament champion

2017–18 State University of New York Athletic Conference ice hockey standings
	Conference							Overall					
	GP	W	L	T	PTS	GF	GA	GP	W	L	T	GF	GA
Oswego State †	16	13	2	1	27	59	21	26	18	6	2	90	45
Geneseo State *	16	10	3	3	23	60	31	29	20	6	3	125	60
Buffalo State	16	9	4	3	21	54	37	27	17	7	3	100	62
Plattsburgh State	16	7	8	1	15	48	52	26	13	12	1	86	78
Fredonia State	16	7	8	1	15	51	51	28	13	11	4	91	89
Potsdam State	16	6	8	2	14	36	53	26	10	11	5	71	81
Cortland State	16	5	9	2	12	40	49	25	10	13	2	67	72
Brockport State	16	5	10	1	11	39	53	25	11	13	1	74	81
Morrisville State	16	3	13	0	6	34	74	25	6	16	3	61	104
Championship: March 3, 2018 † indicates conference regular season champion * indicates conference tournament champions

2017–18 United Collegiate Hockey Conference standings
	Conference							Overall					
	GP	W	L	T	PTS	GF	GA	GP	W	L	T	GF	GA
Utica †*	16	12	4	0	24	79	34	27	21	5	1	133	55
Stevenson	16	9	3	4	22	50	30	26	11	8	7	78	71
Lebanon Valley	16	10	4	2	22	64	47	24	12	10	2	80	81
Manhattanville	16	9	5	2	20	67	44	26	12	9	5	93	68
Elmira	16	8	5	3	19	57	45	28	15	10	3	94	85
Neumann	16	8	6	2	18	54	52	27	10	15	2	78	100
Nazareth	16	7	8	1	15	46	41	25	10	13	2	66	69
Chatham	16	2	14	0	4	20	83	25	2	20	3	36	125
King's	16	0	16	0	0	30	91	25	0	25	0	47	134
Championship: March 3, 2018 † indicates conference regular season champion * indicates conference tournament champions

2017–18 Wisconsin Intercollegiate Athletic Conference ice hockey standings
	Conference							Overall					
	GP	W	L	T	PTS	GF	GA	GP	W	L	T	GF	GA
Wisconsin–Stevens Point †	8	6	0	2	14	31	16	30	21	6	3	109	59
Wisconsin–Eau Claire *	8	5	2	1	11	32	21	28	17	10	1	95	65
Wisconsin–Stout	8	3	4	1	7	18	23	26	7	16	3	64	90
Wisconsin–Superior	8	2	5	1	5	20	26	27	9	15	3	69	86
Wisconsin–River Falls	8	1	6	1	3	11	26	29	8	17	4	72	85
Championship: March 3, 2018 † indicates conference regular season champion * indicates conference tournament champion

Note: Mini-game are not included in final standings

== Player stats ==
=== Scoring leaders ===
GP = Games played; G = Goals; A = Assists; Pts = Points; PIM = Penalty minutes

Player	Class	Team	GP	G	A	Pts	PIM
Brady Fleurent	Junior	University of New England	27	16	35	51	6
Nick Ford	Sophomore	Elmira	28	25	25	50	6
Tanner Karty	Junior	Wisconsin–Stevens Point	30	22	26	48	12
Ryan Bloom	Sophomore	University of New England	29	19	28	47	6
Nick DiNicola	Junior	Fitchburg State	27	11	36	47	30
Colin Larkin	Senior	Massachusetts–Boston	27	24	22	46	12
Jory Ruiz	Junior	Massachusetts–Dartmouth	27	27	18	45	12
Jack Billings	Sophomore	Salve Regina	30	19	26	45	6
Scott Cuthrell	Senior	Nichols	30	13	32	45	16
Connor Powell	Junior	Elmira	28	16	28	44	10

=== Leading goaltenders ===
GP = Games played; Min = Minutes played; W = Wins; L = Losses; T = Ties; GA = Goals against; SO = Shutouts; SV% = Save percentage; GAA = Goals against average

Player	Class	Team	GP	Min	W	L	T	GA	SO	SV%	GAA
Dillon Kelley	Senior	Adrian	11	550	7	1	0	11	1	.949	1.20
Evan Buitenhuis	Senior	Hamilton	14	797	8	3	3	17	4	.954	1.28
T.J. Black	Junior	St. Norbert	32	1833	27	3	1	44	4	.940	1.44
David Richer	Sophomore	Oswego State	19	1144	13	4	2	95	2	.934	1.52
Alex Connal	Sophomore	Hobart	14	492	7	0	2	23	2	.929	1.69
Devin McDonald	Junior	Geneseo State	27	1603	19	4	3	48	3	.927	1.80
Alex Morin	Senior	Trinity	25	1488	17	6	2	45	4	.927	1.81
Max Milosek	Senior	Wisconsin–Stevens Point	26	1542	17	6	3	48	0	.925	1.87
Anthony Tirabassi	Sophomore	Hamilton	12	703	7	4	0	22	2	.929	1.88
Kevin Entmaa	Junior	Adrian	20	1115	16	4	0	35	3	.932	1.88

== 2018 NCAA Tournament ==
First Round; March 10
E4	Nichols	3
E5	Fitchburg State	1
W4	Augsburg	3
W5	Marian	1
E2	University of New England	2
E7	Colby	4
E3	Hobart	2
E6	Geneseo State	4

Quarterfinals; March 17
W2	Adrian	2
W3	Wisconsin–Stevens Point	5
E1	Salve Regina	4
E4	Nichols	3
W1	St. Norbert (1)	5
W4	Augsburg	2
E7	Colby	2
E6	Geneseo State	1

Semifinals; March 23
W3	Wisconsin–Stevens Point	0
E1	Salve Regina	3
W1	St. Norbert (1)	4
E7	Colby	3

National Championship; March 24
E1	Salve Regina	2
W1	St. Norbert (1)	3**

Note: * denotes overtime period(s) Source:

== Awards ==
=== NCAA ===
Award		Recipient
Sid Watson Award		Colin Larkin, Massachusetts–Boston
Edward Jeremiah Award		Blaise MacDonald (Colby)
Tournament Most Outstanding Player		Tanner Froese, St. Norbert
East First Team	Position	West First Team
Blake Wojtala, Salve Regina	G	T.J. Black, St. Norbert
Dalton Carter, Utica	D	Sean Campbell, St. Norbert
Logan Day, Endicott	D	Cory Dunn, Adrian
Roman Ammirato, Utica	F	Tanner Froese, St. Norbert
Brady Fleurent, University of New England	F	Tanner Karty, Wisconsin-Stevens Point
Colin Larkin, Massachusetts–Boston	F	Mathew Thompson, Adrian
East Second Team	Position	West Second Team
Connor Rodericks, Connecticut College	G	Max Milosek, Wisconsin-Stevens Point
Nick Albano, Massachusetts–Boston	D	Mathias Ahman, Wisconsin-Stout
Pat Condon, Geneseo State	D	Braydon Barker, Concordia (WI)
Jack Billings, Salve Regina	F	Lane King, Lawrence
Nick Ford, Elmira	F	Taylor McCloy, Adrian
Mitchell Herlihey, Oswego State	F	Hunter Stewart, Marian
East Third Team	Position	
Evan Buitenhuis, Hamilton	G	
Ryan Burr, University of New England	D	
Michael Anthony Guerrera, Buffalo State	D	
Tanner Shaw, Hobart	F	
Conlan Keenan, Geneseo State	F	
Jonathan Ruiz, Massachusetts–Dartmouth	F	

== See also ==
- 2017–18 NCAA Division I men's ice hockey season
- 2017–18 NCAA Division II men's ice hockey season
