= 2011–12 NCAA Division III men's ice hockey season =

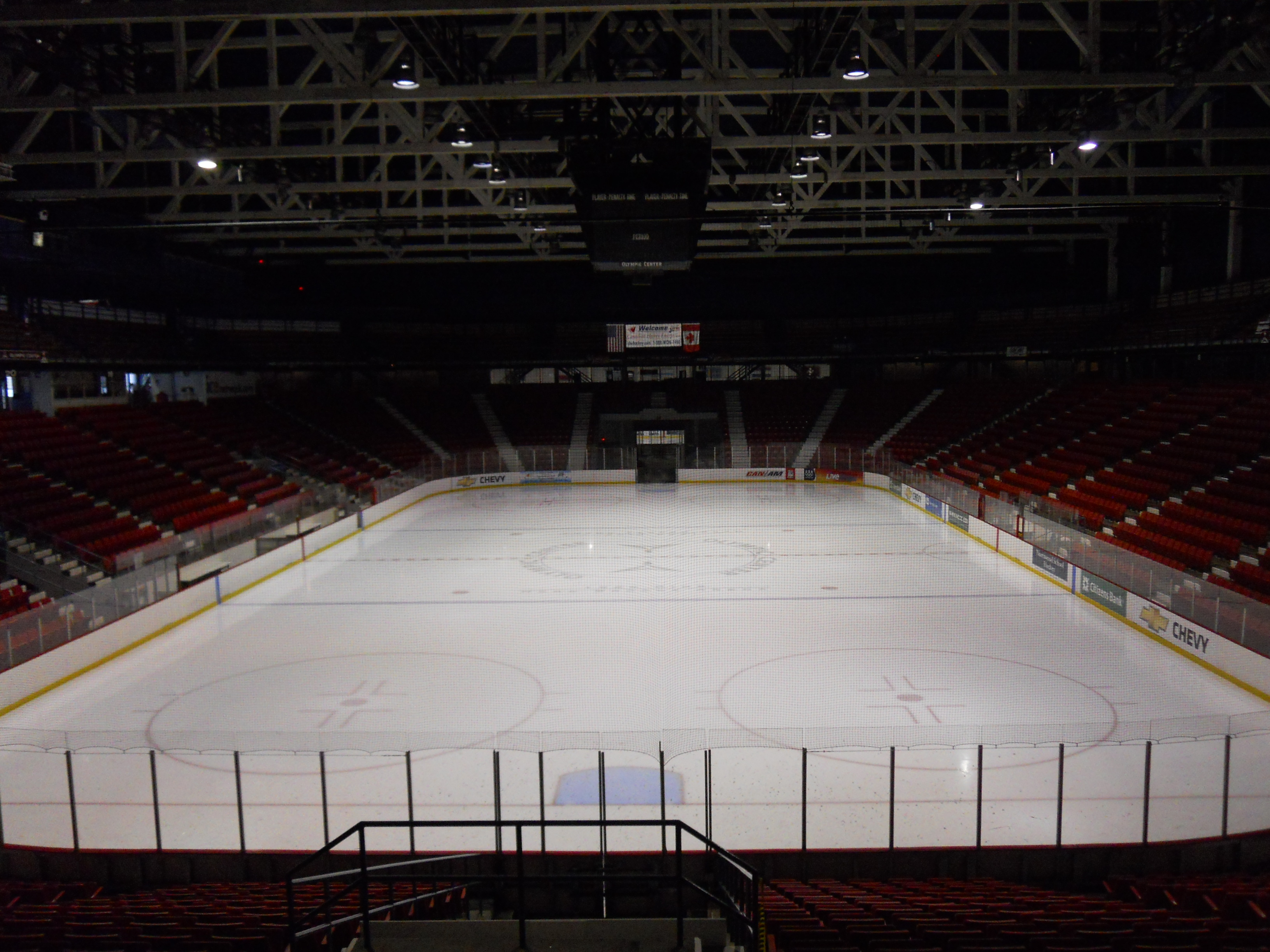
- Herb Brooks Arena was the host of the 2012 Frozen Four
- Duration: October 21, 2011– March 17, 2012
- NCAA tournament: 2012
- National championship: Herb Brooks Arena; Lake Placid, New York
- NCAA champion: St. Norbert
- Sid Watson Award: Jonathan LaRose (Amherst)

The 2011–12 NCAA Division III men's ice hockey season began on October 21, 2011, and concluded on March 17, 2012. This was the 39th season of Division III college ice hockey.

ECAC East and the NESCAC ended the arrangement where all games between conference members were counted for their conference standings.

== Regular season ==
=== Standings ===
2011–12 ECAC East standings
	Conference							Overall					
	GP	W	L	T	PTS	GF	GA	GP	W	L	T	GF	GA
Division III
Norwich †*	18	15	2	1	31	85	35	29	24	3	2	134	51
Castleton State	18	12	4	2	26	81	42	28	19	7	2	124	67
Babson	18	9	5	4	22	55	56	26	9	13	4	69	92
Skidmore	18	10	8	0	20	64	54	27	12	13	2	90	87
Massachusetts–Boston	18	9	8	1	19	55	51	26	13	10	3	87	65
Southern Maine	18	7	7	4	18	56	57	27	10	11	6	77	84
New England College	18	6	8	4	16	58	59	26	9	12	5	79	80
University of New England	18	2	16	0	4	48	93	25	4	19	2	66	121
Division II
Saint Anselm	18	7	8	3	17	56	64	27	14	8	5	101	80
Saint Michael's	18	3	14	1	7	36	83	26	6	18	2	60	113
Championship: March 3, 2012 † indicates conference regular season champion * indicates conference tournament champion

2011–12 ECAC Northeast standings
	Conference							Overall					
	GP	W	L	T	PTS	GF	GA	GP	W	L	T	GF	GA
Wentworth †*	14	11	2	1	23	65	34	29	21	7	1	107	72
Curry	14	11	3	0	22	78	41	27	14	11	2	118	87
Nichols	14	9	4	1	19	60	43	27	12	13	2	89	96
Western New England	14	8	5	1	17	53	45	27	14	12	1	82	81
Johnson & Wales	14	7	5	2	16	67	41	26	13	10	3	116	74
Becker	14	4	9	1	9	42	55	26	9	15	2	75	99
Salve Regina	14	2	12	0	4	35	81	25	6	19	0	62	134
Suffolk	14	1	13	0	2	29	89	24	3	21	0	52	134
Championship: March 3, 2012 † indicates conference regular season champion * indicates conference tournament champions

2011–12 ECAC West standings
	Conference							Overall					
	GP	W	L	T	PTS	GF	GA	GP	W	L	T	GF	GA
Elmira †	12	8	2	2	16	51	33	27	15	9	3	97	80
Manhattanville	12	6	6	0	12	41	53	25	13	9	3	99	81
Hobart *	12	5	6	1	11	44	40	27	16	10	1	99	70
Utica	12	4	6	2	10	37	41	26	15	9	2	109	74
Neumann	12	3	6	3	9	31	37	26	15	8	3	99	79
Championship: March 3, 2012 † indicates conference regular season champion * indicates conference tournament champions

2011–12 Massachusetts State Collegiate Athletic Conference ice hockey standings
	Conference							Overall					
	GP	W	L	T	PTS	GF	GA	GP	W	L	T	GF	GA
Plymouth State †*	18	12	3	3	27	60	41	27	17	7	3	89	65
Salem State	18	11	4	3	25	74	45	27	15	9	3	104	78
Massachusetts–Dartmouth	18	10	6	2	22	64	46	27	16	9	2	105	75
Fitchburg State	18	8	7	3	19	58	58	26	9	13	4	72	84
Worcester State	18	5	11	2	12	42	55	27	9	15	3	68	82
Westfield State	18	4	10	4	12	47	67	26	7	14	5	68	96
Framingham State	18	3	12	3	9	42	75	25	6	15	4	62	102
Championship: March 3, 2012 † indicates conference regular season champion * indicates conference tournament champions

2011–12 Midwest Collegiate Hockey Association standings
	Conference							Overall					
	GP	W	L	T	PTS	GF	GA	GP	W	L	T	GF	GA
North Division
Marian	20	12	5	3	27	74	54	26	13	9	4	93	80
Lawrence	20	11	6	3	25	65	50	28	13	11	4	83	80
Finlandia	20	7	13	0	14	62	84	26	7	18	1	69	108
Northland	20	5	13	2	12	61	89	25	6	16	3	78	109
South Division
Adrian †	20	17	2	1	35	100	45	27	20	6	1	118	67
MSOE *	20	16	3	1	33	92	42	30	22	7	1	124	65
Lake Forest	20	4	16	0	8	49	83	27	5	22	0	62	112
Concordia (WI)	20	2	16	2	6	53	109	25	2	20	3	61	135
Championship: March 4, 2012 † indicates conference regular season champion * indicates conference tournament champions

2011–12 Minnesota Intercollegiate Athletic Conference ice hockey standings
	Conference							Overall					
	GP	W	L	T	Pts	GF	GA	GP	W	L	T	GF	GA
St. Thomas †	16	13	2	1	27	55	35	26	18	6	2	86	60
Gustavus Adolphus *	16	8	5	3	19	51	40	29	17	7	5	88	67
Saint John's	16	9	7	0	18	53	48	26	11	13	2	78	78
St. Olaf	16	7	6	3	17	49	38	28	13	9	6	82	70
Hamline	16	7	8	1	15	44	43	26	10	14	2	72	81
Concordia (MN)	16	6	7	3	15	32	36	25	10	11	4	48	59
Bethel	16	6	8	2	14	42	51	25	8	15	2	68	95
Augsburg	16	6	9	1	13	41	55	25	10	14	1	67	83
Saint Mary's	16	2	12	2	6	40	61	25	5	18	2	60	89
Championship: March 3, 2012 † indicates conference regular season champion * indicates conference tournament champion

2011–12 New England Small College Athletic Conference ice hockey standings
	Conference							Overall					
	GP	W	L	T	PTS	GF	GA	GP	W	L	T	GF	GA
Amherst †*	18	17	1	0	34	73	30	29	24	4	1	109	48
Bowdoin	18	12	3	3	27	84	47	25	16	6	3	114	64
Middlebury	18	11	6	1	23	53	38	27	14	10	3	73	63
Hamilton	18	9	8	1	19	46	65	25	12	11	2	69	83
Williams	18	8	8	2	18	57	52	26	12	9	5	82	67
Colby	18	7	9	2	16	54	59	25	12	11	2	79	71
Trinity	18	6	10	2	14	46	59	24	9	13	2	67	77
Wesleyan	18	4	12	2	10	39	59	25	8	14	3	63	86
Connecticut College	18	4	12	2	10	46	72	24	6	15	3	62	94
Tufts	18	4	13	1	9	48	65	23	7	15	1	64	78
Championship: March 4, 2012 † indicates conference regular season champion * indicates conference tournament champion

2011–12 Northern Collegiate Hockey Association standings
	Conference							Overall					
	GP	W	L	T	Pts	GF	GA	GP	W	L	T	GF	GA
St. Norbert †*	18	12	4	2	26	66	45	31	21	5	5	118	64
St. Scholastica	18	9	5	4	22	57	53	28	15	8	5	97	78
Wisconsin–River Falls	18	10	6	2	22	57	54	27	16	9	2	91	68
Wisconsin–Stevens Point	18	8	6	4	20	57	48	29	14	11	4	87	73
Wisconsin–Superior	18	4	7	7	15	44	48	27	10	10	7	72	69
Wisconsin–Eau Claire	18	5	11	2	12	45	55	28	13	12	3	73	66
Wisconsin–Stout	18	4	13	1	9	45	68	27	8	17	2	80	98
Championship: March 3, 2012 † indicates conference regular season champion * indicates conference tournament champion

2011–12 State University of New York Athletic Conference ice hockey standings
	Conference							Overall					
	GP	W	L	T	PTS	GF	GA	GP	W	L	T	GF	GA
Oswego State †	16	14	0	2	30	80	26	30	24	4	2	134	54
Plattsburgh State *	16	12	3	1	25	54	32	28	19	5	4	92	56
Buffalo State	16	8	7	1	17	65	46	27	13	12	2	99	85
Geneseo State	16	7	8	1	15	44	52	26	13	12	1	88	80
Fredonia State	16	6	7	3	15	56	53	26	12	11	3	87	80
Potsdam State	16	6	10	0	12	51	63	26	8	16	2	83	110
Brockport State	16	5	9	2	12	55	71	25	9	13	3	91	103
Cortland State	16	4	11	1	9	47	80	25	6	18	1	69	124
Morrisville State	16	4	11	1	9	49	78	25	5	19	1	69	127
Championship: March 3, 2012 † indicates conference regular season champion * indicates conference tournament champions

Note: Mini-games are not included in final standings

== Player stats ==
=== Scoring leaders ===
GP = Games played; G = Goals; A = Assists; Pts = Points; PIM = Penalty minutes

Player	Class	Team	GP	G	A	Pts	PIM
Jeremiah Ketts	Senior	Johnson & Wales	26	20	33	53	44
Jordan Keizer	Junior	MSOE	30	23	22	45	20
Lou Educate	Freshman	Nichols	27	27	15	42	66
Pier-Olivier Cotnoir	Junior	Norwich	29	21	21	42	21
Zach Graham	Junior	Adrian	26	15	27	42	37
Jon Whitlaw	Junior	Oswego State	30	19	22	41	10
Nick Lazorko	Sophomore	Castleton	26	23	17	40	35
Mike Owens	Senior	Massachusetts-Dartmouth	27	23	17	40	18
Daniel Bell	Junior	Castleton	27	18	22	40	10
Johan Ryd	Senior	St.Norbert	31	15	25	40	10
Ryan Barlock	Senior	Curry	27	11	29	40	92
Sy Nutkevitch	Senior	Potsdam State	26	9	31	40	52

=== Leading goaltenders ===
GP = Games played; Min = Minutes played; W = Wins; L = Losses; T = Ties; GA = Goals against; SO = Shutouts; SV% = Save percentage; GAA = Goals against average

Player	Class	Team	GP	Min	W	L	T	GA	SO	SV%	GAA
Chris Czarnota	Sophomore	Norwich	11	580	8	1	1	11	3	.940	1.14
David Jacobson	Freshman	St. Norbert	25	1449	19	2	3	37	4	.936	1.53
Johnathan LaRose	Senior	Amherst	22	1319	19	2	1	34	5	.943	1.55
Andrew Hare	Junior	Oswego State	27	1578	21	4	2	46	4	.931	1.75
Richard Nerland	Senior	Bowdoin	11	565	6	1	1	17	2	.929	1.81
Mathieu Cadieux	Sophomore	Plattsburgh State	24	1384	16	5	3	44	3	.928	1.85
Parker Carroll	Sophomore	Norwich	20	1159	16	2	1	38	3	.889	1.97
Connor Toomey	Senior	MSOE	30	1785	22	7	1	59	3	.926	1.98
Alexandre Peck	Freshman	Wentworth	17	974	13	3	1	33	1	.918	2.03
Scott Shackell	Freshman	Adrian	18	985	13	3	1	34	2	.931	2.07

== 2012 NCAA Tournament ==
First Round; March 7
E6	Plymouth State	1
E7	Wentworth	3
W1	St. Norbert	3
W4	St. Thomas	1
W2	Gustavus Adolphus	3
W3	MSOE	1

Quarterfinals; March 10
E1	Norwich (1)	3
E7	Wentworth	0
W1	St. Norbert	4
W2	Gustavus Adolphus	1
E2	Oswego State (2)	5
E5	Elmira	0
E3	Amherst (3)	3
E4	Plattsburgh State (4)	1

Semifinals; March 16
E1	Norwich (1)	1
W1	St. Norbert	4
E2	Oswego State (2)	2*
E3	Amherst (3)	1

National Championship; March 17
W1	St. Norbert	4
E2	Oswego State (2)	1

Note: * denotes overtime period(s)

== See also ==
- 2011–12 NCAA Division I men's ice hockey season
- 2011–12 NCAA Division II men's ice hockey season
