= 2009–10 NCAA Division III men's ice hockey season =

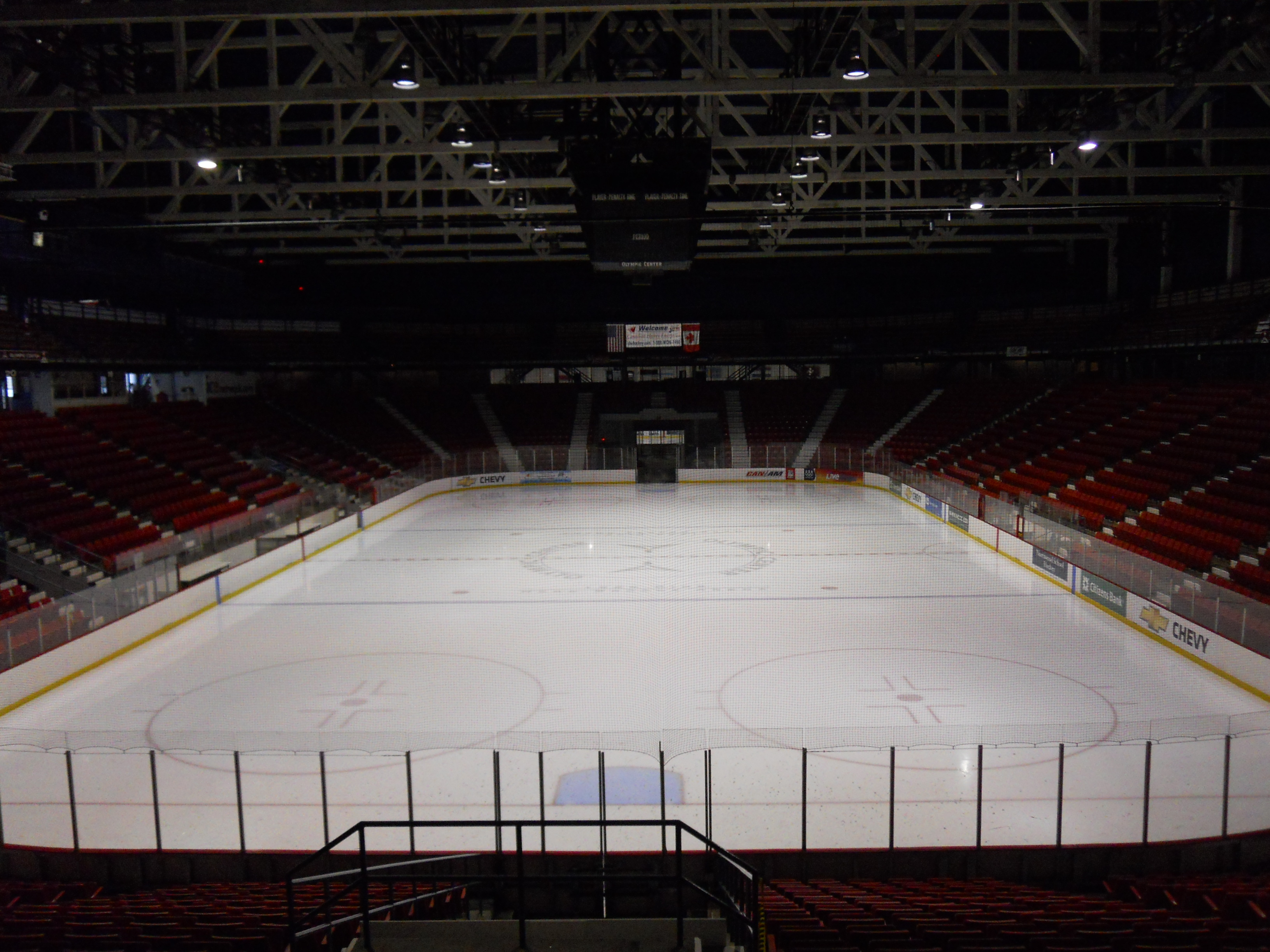
- Herb Brooks Arena was the host of the 2010 Frozen Four
- Duration: October 23, 2009– March 20, 2010
- NCAA tournament: 2010
- National championship: Herb Brooks Arena; Lake Placid, New York
- NCAA champion: Norwich
- Sid Watson Award: David Martinson (Gustavus Adolphus)

The 2009–10 NCAA Division III men's ice hockey season began on October 23, 2009, and concluded on March 20, 2010. This was the 37th season of Division III college ice hockey.

The MASCAC began sponsoring men's ice hockey for the 2009–10 season. Five league members joined with two other schools (who became affiliate members) to form the new conference. Because six of the schools had previously been in ECAC Northeast it caused a realignment within that conference which caused the four Division II schools to formally leave and form Northeast-10's ice hockey division along with two schools from ECAC East. The two teams from ECAC East were members of both conferences from 2009 until 2017 when they left the ECAC East (by then called the New England Hockey Conference).

== Regular season ==
=== Standings ===
2009–10 ECAC East standings
	Conference							Overall					
	GP	W	L	T	PTS	GF	GA	GP	W	L	T	GF	GA
Division III
Norwich †*	19	16	1	2	34	91	29	31	26	1	4	147	43
Babson	19	9	9	1	19	57	42	28	14	12	2	87	67
Castleton State	19	7	9	3	17	58	59	26	9	12	5	80	86
Southern Maine	19	7	9	3	17	51	66	26	10	13	3	79	93
Skidmore	19	7	10	2	16	60	60	27	9	16	2	80	97
New England College	19	6	11	2	14	57	70	27	11	14	2	87	92
Massachusetts–Boston	19	6	11	2	14	53	72	25	10	13	2	79	84
University of New England	19	2	17	0	4	34	89	25	3	22	0	43	115
Division II
Saint Anselm	19	9	9	1	19	64	70	27	15	11	1	113	91
Saint Michael's	19	3	13	3	9	48	86	27	7	17	3	81	115
Championship: March 6, 2010 † indicates conference regular season champion * indicates conference tournament champion

2009–10 ECAC Northeast standings
	Conference							Overall					
	GP	W	L	T	PTS	GF	GA	GP	W	L	T	GF	GA
Wentworth †	14	11	3	0	22	64	36	26	20	5	1	125	75
Curry *	14	10	3	1	21	59	31	29	19	9	1	119	80
Suffolk	14	8	4	2	18	49	36	26	12	11	3	78	83
Becker	14	8	6	0	16	38	33	26	13	12	1	71	80
Nichols	14	7	6	1	15	49	54	26	13	10	3	93	100
Johnson & Wales	14	7	6	1	15	51	45	28	12	15	1	97	105
Western New England	14	2	12	0	4	31	64	25	3	21	1	67	138
Salve Regina	14	0	13	1	1	36	78	26	1	24	1	58	140
Championship: March 6, 2010 † indicates conference regular season champion * indicates conference tournament champions

2009–10 ECAC West standings
	Conference							Overall					
	GP	W	L	T	PTS	GF	GA	GP	W	L	T	GF	GA
Elmira †	15	11	4	0	22	62	34	29	19	9	1	108	67
Manhattanville *	15	10	4	1	21	66	35	27	20	6	1	114	63
Hobart	15	9	4	2	20	61	39	26	13	10	3	94	71
Neumann	15	7	5	3	17	49	44	27	15	9	3	102	75
Utica	15	4	9	2	10	47	72	26	8	14	4	90	105
Lebanon Valley	15	0	15	0	0	26	87	25	0	25	0	48	143
Championship: March 6, 2010 † indicates conference regular season champion * indicates conference tournament champions

2009–10 Massachusetts State Collegiate Athletic Conference ice hockey standings
	Conference							Overall					
	GP	W	L	T	PTS	GF	GA	GP	W	L	T	GF	GA
Fitchburg State †	18	14	4	0	28	89	62	27	20	6	1	121	85
Salem State *	18	11	3	4	26	80	42	27	15	8	4	110	72
Plymouth State	18	12	5	1	25	81	61	27	17	9	1	115	93
Westfield State	18	10	5	3	23	84	71	26	13	10	3	108	105
Massachusetts–Dartmouth	18	5	12	1	11	58	67	27	11	15	1	95	93
Worcester State	18	3	13	2	8	49	92	25	5	18	2	71	127
Framingham State	18	2	15	1	5	54	100	24	2	20	2	66	133
Championship: March 6, 2010 † indicates conference regular season champion * indicates conference tournament champions

2009–10 Midwest Collegiate Hockey Association standings
	Conference							Overall					
	GP	W	L	T	PTS	GF	GA	GP	W	L	T	GF	GA
North Division
Marian	20	18	2	0	36	109	51	27	20	7	0	131	80
Lawrence	20	7	11	2	16	72	82	28	10	16	2	95	111
Northland	20	5	14	1	11	68	127	27	5	21	1	84	176
Finlandia	20	4	14	2	10	60	90	25	5	17	3	74	108
South Division
Adrian †*	20	20	0	0	40	160	40	28	24	4	0	188	69
MSOE	20	12	7	1	25	82	60	27	14	11	2	106	82
Lake Forest	20	8	10	2	18	74	97	27	9	16	2	93	133
Concordia (WI)	20	0	16	4	4	48	126	25	0	20	5	56	151
Championship: March 6, 2010 † indicates conference regular season champion * indicates conference tournament champions

2009–10 Minnesota Intercollegiate Athletic Conference ice hockey standings
	Conference							Overall					
	GP	W	L	T	Pts	GF	GA	GP	W	L	T	GF	GA
Gustavus Adolphus †	16	12	2	2	26	69	35	29	20	7	2	108	70
Hamline	16	11	3	2	24	65	38	26	16	6	4	100	68
St. Thomas *	16	8	6	2	18	51	58	28	13	11	4	82	100
Augsburg	16	8	7	1	17	46	48	27	16	10	1	83	74
St. Olaf	16	6	6	4	16	53	51	26	12	10	4	86	76
Bethel	16	8	8	0	16	55	51	25	10	15	0	79	96
Concordia (MN)	16	4	7	5	13	37	46	25	5	15	5	60	84
Saint John's	16	5	9	2	12	49	51	25	9	12	4	78	79
Saint Mary's	16	1	15	0	2	30	75	25	1	23	1	47	118
Championship: March 3, 2010 † indicates conference regular season champion * indicates conference tournament champion

2009–10 New England Small College Athletic Conference ice hockey standings
	Conference							Overall					
	GP	W	L	T	PTS	GF	GA	GP	W	L	T	GF	GA
Bowdoin †	19	14	4	1	29	82	45	27	19	7	1	116	72
Middlebury *	19	12	3	4	28	74	47	28	19	5	4	111	67
Williams	19	13	5	1	27	59	42	24	15	6	3	76	50
Amherst	19	11	4	4	26	60	38	25	16	5	4	84	44
Trinity	19	11	6	2	24	59	45	26	15	9	2	83	69
Hamilton	19	11	7	1	23	67	68	26	15	9	2	94	93
Tufts	19	8	8	3	19	55	59	25	12	10	3	81	76
Colby	19	7	8	4	18	57	59	24	11	9	4	75	69
Connecticut College	19	7	11	1	15	50	61	24	8	15	1	59	79
Wesleyan	19	4	15	0	8	54	84	23	7	16	0	67	97
Championship: March 7, 2010 † indicates conference regular season champion * indicates conference tournament champion

2009–10 Northern Collegiate Hockey Association standings
	Conference							Overall					
	GP	W	L	T	Pts	GF	GA	GP	W	L	T	GF	GA
St. Norbert †*	18	14	2	2	30	74	32	31	24	4	3	127	54
St. Scholastica	18	11	3	4	26	60	38	28	17	5	6	108	65
Wisconsin–River Falls	18	9	7	2	20	53	60	29	18	9	2	103	86
Wisconsin–Stout	18	6	8	4	16	47	59	27	10	13	4	79	90
Wisconsin–Stevens Point	18	6	12	0	12	48	64	28	12	15	1	87	96
Wisconsin–Eau Claire	18	4	10	4	12	42	53	27	8	15	4	69	80
Wisconsin–Superior	18	3	11	4	10	45	63	27	9	11	7	88	87
Championship: March 6, 2010 † indicates conference regular season champion * indicates conference tournament champion

2009–10 State University of New York Athletic Conference ice hockey standings
	Conference							Overall					
	GP	W	L	T	PTS	GF	GA	GP	W	L	T	GF	GA
Oswego State †*	16	15	1	0	30	87	28	29	26	3	0	154	59
Plattsburgh State	16	13	2	1	27	76	30	29	19	6	4	125	60
Fredonia State	16	9	5	2	20	71	59	26	17	7	2	124	75
Geneseo State ^	16	9	6	1	19	50	47	25	13	10	2	88	77
Brockport State	16	7	8	1	15	43	57	27	14	12	1	82	84
Potsdam State	16	5	10	1	11	56	74	25	9	14	2	83	108
Morrisville State	16	5	11	0	10	49	74	26	9	17	0	77	116
Cortland State	16	4	12	0	8	43	69	25	7	18	0	74	104
Buffalo State	16	2	14	0	4	37	74	25	6	18	1	71	109
Championship: March 6, 2010 † indicates conference regular season champion * indicates conference tournament champions^ Geneseo was barred from postseason play in 2010.

Note: Mini-game are not included in final standings

== Player stats ==
=== Scoring leaders ===
GP = Games played; G = Goals; A = Assists; Pts = Points; PIM = Penalty minutes

Player	Class	Team	GP	G	A	Pts	PIM
Eric Selleck	Sophomore	Oswego State	28	21	33	54	48
Mike Dahlinger	Junior	Adrian	28	13	41	54	58
David Martinson	Senior	Gustavus Adolphus	29	29	20	49	24
Coleman Noonan	Junior	Saint Anselm	27	23	24	47	32
Craig Houle	Redshirt	Johnson & Wales	28	19	28	47	60
Justin Fox	Junior	Oswego State	27	14	33	47	37
Chris Laganiere	Junior	Oswego State	29	16	30	46	30
Chris Chambers	Senior	Plymouth State	27	18	27	45	42
Zach Graham	Freshman	Adrian	27	16	29	45	10
Sam Kuzyk	Junior	Adrian	28	20	24	44	18
Zach Kohn	Junior	Nichols	26	16	28	44	8

=== Leading goaltenders ===
GP = Games played; Min = Minutes played; W = Wins; L = Losses; T = Ties; GA = Goals against; SO = Shutouts; SV% = Save percentage; GAA = Goals against average

Player	Class	Team	GP	Min	W	L	T	GA	SO	SV%	GAA
Ryan Klingensmith	Senior	Norwich	28	1714	24	1	3	37	7	.933	1.29
B.J. O'Brien	Junior	St. Norbert	30	1825	24	3	3	49	4	.927	1.61
Josh Leis	Freshman	Plattsburgh State	17	936	9	4	3	28	2	.929	1.79
Cole Anderson	Junior	Amherst	22	1331	13	5	4	42	2	.926	1.89
Paul Beckwith	Sophomore	Oswego State	10	536	8	1	0	17	0	.928	1.90
Zeke Testa	Freshman	Babson	18	1032	8	8	1	35	2	.931	2.03
Ryan Purdy	Sophomore	Williams	21	1236	11	6	3	42	2	.936	2.04
Josh Swartout	Junior	Gustavus Adolphus	25	1593	18	5	2	55	3	.911	2.07
Kyle Gunn-Taylor	Senior	Oswego State	21	1199	18	2	0	42	0	.913	2.10
Zach Kleiman	Senior	St. Scholastica	18	994	11	2	5	35	3	.931	2.11

== 2010 NCAA Tournament ==
First Round; March 10
W1	St. Norbert (3)	4
W4	Adrian	3
W2	Gustavus Adolphus	3
W3	St. Thomas	0
E6	Elmira	4
E7	Curry	1

Quarterfinals; March 13
E2	Oswego State (2)	9
E5	Bowdoin	2
W1	St. Norbert (3)	3
W2	Gustavus Adolphus	1
E3	Middlebury (4)	2
E4	Plattsburgh State	3*
E1	Norwich (1)	2*
E6	Elmira	1

Semifinals; March 19
E2	Oswego State (2)	3
W1	St. Norbert (3)	4
E4	Plattsburgh State	2
E1	Norwich (1)	3

National Championship; March 20
W1	St. Norbert (3)	1
E1	Norwich (1)	2*

Note: * denotes overtime period(s)

== Awards ==
=== NCAA ===
Award		Recipient
Sid Watson Award		David Martinson, Gustavus Adolphus
Edward Jeremiah Award		Mike McShane, Norwich
Tournament Most Outstanding Player		B. J. O'Brien, St. Norbert
East First Team	Position	West First Team
Ryan Klingensmith, Norwich	G	B.J. O’Brien, St. Norbert
Kyle Hardy, Bowdoin	D	Chris Berenguer, Hamline
Eric Tallent, Norwich	D	Nick Tabisz, St. Norbert
Mickey Lang, Manhattanville	F	Jordan Chong, St. Scholastica
Eric Selleck, Oswego State	F	Joel Gaulrapp, Wisconsin–Stout
Alex Smigelski, Williams	F	David Martinson, Gustavus Adolphus
East Second Team	Position	West Second Team
Scott Barchard, Tufts	G	Josh Swartout, Gustavus Adolphus
A.J. Mikkelsen, Manhattanville	D	Mitch Carlson, Gustavus Adolphus
Steve Rizer, Fredonia State	D	Chris Stansik, Adrian
Chad Anderson, Norwich	F	Tyler Czuba, Wisconsin–River Falls
Martin Drolet, Middlebury	F	Mike Dahlinger, Adrian
Coleman Noonan, Brockport State	F	Chris Johnson, Augsburg

== See also ==
- 2009–10 NCAA Division I men's ice hockey season
- 2009–10 NCAA Division II men's ice hockey season
