= St. Norbert Green Knights softball =

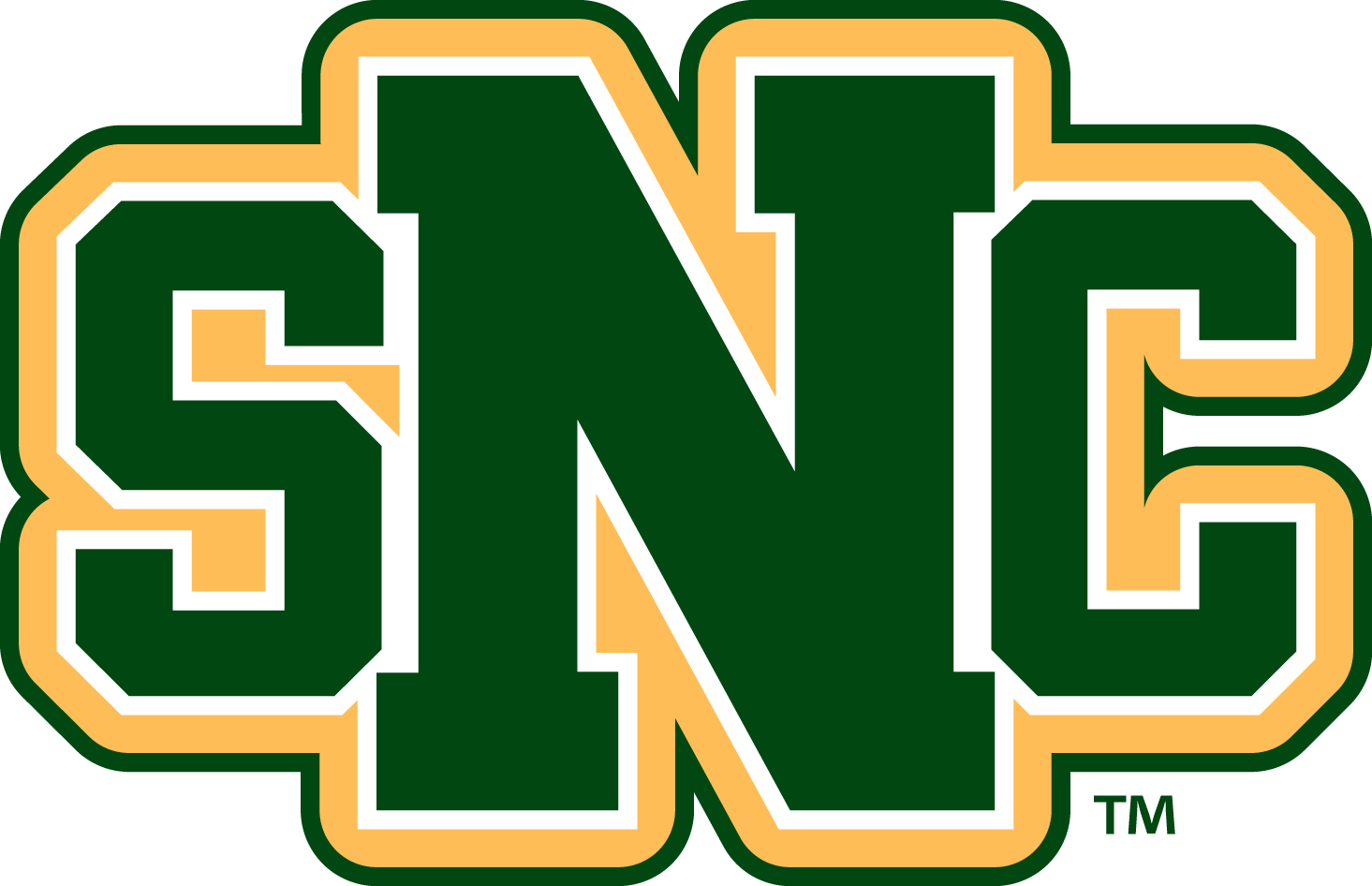
- University: St. Norbert College
- Head coach: JoAnn Krueger (16th season)
- Conference: MWC
- Location: De Pere, Wisconsin, US
- Home stadium: Mel Nicks Field
- Nickname: Green Knights
- Colors: Green and Gold

The St. Norbert Green Knights softball team represents St. Norbert College in NCAA Division III college softball. The team participates in the Midwest Conference. The Green Knights are currently led by head coach JoAnn Krueger. The team plays its home games at Mel Nicks Field located on the college's campus.

== Year-by-year results ==
| Season | Conference | Coach | Overall | | | | Conference | | | | Notes |
| Season | Conference | Coach | Games | Win | Loss | Tie | Games | Win | Loss | Tie | Notes |
|---|---|---|---|---|---|---|---|---|---|---|---|
| 2007 | MWC | JoAnn Krueger | 34 | 20 | 14 | 0 | 13 | 11 | 2 | 0 | |
| 2008 | MWC | JoAnn Krueger | 32 | 16 | 16 | 0 | 8 | 6 | 2 | 0 | |
| 2009 | MWC | JoAnn Krueger | 36 | 17 | 19 | 0 | 13 | 10 | 3 | 0 | |
| 2010 | MWC | JoAnn Krueger | 41 | 33 | 8 | 0 | 13 | 13 | 0 | 0 | |
| 2011 | MWC | JoAnn Krueger | 38 | 20 | 18 | 0 | 13 | 10 | 3 | 0 | |
| 2012 | MWC | JoAnn Krueger | 38 | 18 | 20 | 0 | 8 | 6 | 2 | 0 | |
| 2013 | MWC | JoAnn Krueger | 35 | 20 | 15 | 0 | 14 | 10 | 4 | 0 | |
