= 2013 NCAA Division III men's ice hockey tournament =

- Teams: 11
- Finals site: Herb Brooks Arena, Lake Placid, New York
- Champions: Wisconsin–Eau Claire Blugolds (1st title)
- Runner-up: Oswego State Lakers (5th title game)
- Semifinalists: Norwich Cadets (11th Frozen Four); Utica Pioneers (1st Frozen Four)
- Winning coach: Matt Loen (1st title)
- MOP: Jordan Singer (Wisconsin–Eau Claire)
- Attendance: 11,321

The 2013 NCAA Division Men's III Ice Hockey Tournament was the culmination of the 2012–13 season, the 30th such tournament in NCAA history. It concluded with Wisconsin–Eau Claire defeating Oswego State in the championship game 5–3. All First Round and Quarterfinal matchups were held at home team venues, while all succeeding games were played at the Herb Brooks Arena in Lake Placid, New York.

== Qualifying teams ==
The following teams qualified for the tournament. Automatic bids were offered to the conference tournament champion of eight different conferences. Three at-large bids were available for the highest-ranked non-conference tournament champions (overall seed in parentheses).

East							West						
Seed	School	Conference	Record	Berth Type	Appearance	Last Bid	Seed	School	Conference	Record	Berth Type	Appearance	Last Bid
1	Norwich (2)	ECAC East	23–3–1	At–Large	14th	2012	1	St. Norbert (1)	NCHA	23–5–1	Tournament Champion	14th	2012
2	Utica (4)	ECAC West	20–5–1	At–Large	1st	Never	2	Adrian (3)	MCHA	23–1–3	Tournament Champion	3rd	2011
3	Oswego State	SUNYAC	23–4–0	Tournament Champion	12th	2012	3	Wisconsin–Eau Claire	NCHA	20–5–2	At–Large	2nd	1989
4	Bowdoin	NESCAC	22–3–2	Tournament Champion	5th	2011	4	Saint John's	MIAC	16–7–4	Tournament Champion	6th	2005
5	Babson	ECAC East	17–6–5	Tournament Champion	13th	2009							
6	Wentworth	ECAC Northeast	16–8–3	Tournament Champion	6th	2012							
7	Massachusetts–Dartmouth	MASCAC	12–7–7	Tournament Champion	4th	2008							

== Format ==
The tournament featured four rounds of play. All rounds were Single-game elimination. The top four ranked teams received byes into the quarterfinal round and were arranged so that were they all to reach the national semifinal the first seed would play the fourth seed and the second seed would play the third seed.

Because the top four ranked teams were split evenly between eastern and western teams these teams were automatically advanced into the Quarterfinal round. The remaining two western teams were placed in the dame First Round game with the winner advancing to play the top western seed. The bottom four eastern teams were arranged as follows; the fourth eastern seed would play the seventh eastern seed with the winner advancing to play the second eastern seed while the fifth eastern seed would play the sixth eastern seed with the winner advancing to play the top eastern seed.

The remaining team, the third eastern seed, received a bye into the quarterfinal to play the second western seed.

In the First Round and Quarterfinals the higher-seeded or ranked team served as host.

== Tournament Bracket ==
First Round; March 6
E5	Babson	6
E6	Wentworth	1
W3	Wisconsin–Eau Claire	4
W4	Saint John's	2
E4	Bowdoin	5
E7	Massachusetts–Dartmouth	2

Quarterfinals; March 9
E1	Norwich (2)	4
E5	Babson	0
W2	Adrian (3)	2
E3	Oswego State	3*
W1	St. Norbert (1)	1
W3	Wisconsin–Eau Claire	3
E2	Utica (4)	4
E4	Bowdoin	2

Semifinals; March 15
E1	Norwich (2)	3
E3	Oswego State	6
W3	Wisconsin–Eau Claire	5
E2	Utica (4)	1

National Championship; March 16
E3	Oswego State	3
W3	Wisconsin–Eau Claire	5

Note: * denotes overtime period(s)

== Results ==
=== First round ===
March 6, 2013; 7:00 PM	(E5) Babson	6 – 1 (1–0, 2–1, 3–0)	(E6) Wentworth	Babson Skating Center – Wellesley, Massachusetts; Attendance: 900

Zeke Testa
Goalies
Joel Miller
Referees:
Jim Tinnirella
Marty Hughes
Linesmen:
Shawn Sullivan
Shane Smith

(Furey, Kravitz) Troy Starrett (9) – 07:45	1–0
(Berto, Vollmin) P.T. Donato (4) – 23:58	2–0
(Berto) Troy Starrett (10) – 28:36	3–0
	3–1	37:53 – Adam Frank (11) (Burgau, Domsodi)
(Furey, Bonazza) Max Franklin (4) – 42:15	4–1
(Bonazza) Jay Haseley (6) – 54:49	5–1
(Leer) Jay Haseley (7) – 59:19	6–1

8 min
Penalties
6 min
33
Shots
20

March 6, 2013; 7:00 PM	(W3) Wisconsin–Eau Claire	4 – 2 (1–1, 3–1, 0–0)	(W4) Saint John's	Hobbs Municipal Ice Center – Eau Claire, Wisconsin; Attendance: 1,341

Brandon Stephenson
Goalies
Saxton Soley
Referees:
John Boche
Mike Elam
Linesmen:
Adam Shadiow
Mark Engstrom

	0–1	07:33 – Michael Palmiscno (5) (Harren)
(Callahan, Donnellan) Kurt Weston (9) – PP – 13:20	1–1
	1–2	31:14 – Tobias Linbro (4) (Harren, Palmiscno)
(Waggoner, Donnellan) Devin Mantha (6) – 32:21	2–2
(Heineman, Darwitz) Isaiah Bennis (11) – 34:22	3–2
(Andersen, McCabe) Kurt Weston (10) – 35:42	4–2

6 min
Penalties
21 min
33
Shots
27

March 6, 2013; 7:00 PM	(E5) Bowdoin	5 – 2 (1–0, 2–2, 2–0)	(E6) Massachusetts–Dartmouth	Sidney J. Watson Arena – Brunswick, Maine; Attendance: 1,826

Steve Messina
Goalies
Ryan Williams

(Collier, McGinnis) Jay Livermore (2) – PP – 09:21	1–0
	1–1	26:19 – Evangelos Stefanou (Colclough, Sartell)
(Livermore, Coffey) Dylan Shamburger (3) – 29:40	2–1
	2–2	34:32 – Casey Skolnik (1) (Colclough, Stefanou)
(Koo) Kyle Lockwood (10) – PP – 39:35	3–2
(Downey) John McGinnis (11) – SH – 41:18	4–2
(Downey) Alexander Milley (1) – 52:07	5–2

8 min
Penalties
10 min
56
Shots
22

=== Quarterfinals ===
March 9, 2013; 7:00 PM	(E1) Norwich	4 – 0 (2–0, 0–0, 2–0)	(E5) Babson	Kreitzberg Arena – Holderness, New Hampshire; Attendance: 1,677

Chris Czarnota
Goalies
Zeke Testa

(Duszynski) Shane Gorman (8) – 09:51	1–0
(Janke, Currier) Kyle Thomas (11) – 19:39	2–0
(Duszynski) Blake Forkey (7) – EN – 56:24	3–0
(Niezgoda, Cotnoir) Kyle Thomas (12) – EN – 57:04	4–0

4 min
Penalties
4 min
39
Shots
14

March 9, 2013; 7:00 PM	(W2) Adrian	2 – 3 (OT) (0–1, 2–1, 0–0, 0–1)	(W3) Oswego State	Arrington Ice Arena – Adrian, Michigan; Attendance: 1,039

Scott Shackell
Goalies
Andrew Hare
Referees:
Steve Olson
Dan Murphy
Linesmen:
Dan Costello
Chris Woodworth

	0–1	06:11 – PP – Chris Muise (10) (Brown, Leimbrock)
(Cousineau, Graham) Josh Ranalli (18) – PP – 23:35	1–1
(Cousineau) Shaquille Merasty (22) – 25:30	2–1
	2–2	38:50 – Jon Whitelaw (10) (Moodie, T. Carr)
	2–3	73:32 – Paul Rodrigues (15) (Moodie)

10 min
Penalties
10 min
33
Shots
55

March 9, 2013; 7:05 PM	(W1) St. Norbert	1 – 3 (1–2, 0–0, 0–1)	(W3) Wisconsin–Eau Claire	Cornerstone Community Center – Ashwaubenon, Wisconsin; Attendance: 1,816

David Jacobson
Goalies
Brandon Stephenson
Referees:
David Marcotte
Tony Lancette
Linesmen:
Brandon Schroder
Jon Parker

	0–1	01:39 – Jon Waggoner (7) (Mantha, Williams)
(Keefer, Stroh) Carl Ekström (6) – PP – 08:23	1–1
	1–2	19:16 – PP – Chris Heineman (6) (McCabe, Weston)
	1–3	59:18 – EN – Kurt Weston (11) (Andersen, Darwitz)

10 min
Penalties
12 min
40
Shots
21

March 9, 2013; 8:30 PM	(E2) Utica	4 – 2 (0–2, 1–0, 3–0)	(E4) Bowdoin	Utica Memorial Auditorium – Utica, New York; Attendance: 3,847

Nick Therrien
Goalies
Max Fenkell
Referees:
John Everett
Mike Shea
Linesmen:
Fraser McIntyre
Nick DeMarte Jr.

	0–1	11:38 – Ollie Koo (16) (Matheson)
	0–2	13:55 – Harry Matheson (13) (Downey, Milley)
(Chlanda, Zappia) Jordan Hobaica (4) – 20:45	1–2
(Chlanda) Trever Hertz (13) – 43:28	2–2
(Chlanda, Gaffney) Ridge Garbutt (10) – 55:36	3–2
(Zappia, Schmitt) Eric Peterson (5) – EN – 59:07	4–2

8 min
Penalties
10 min
25
Shots
29

=== Semifinals ===
March 15, 2013; 4:00 PM	(E1) Norwich	3 – 6 (1–1, 1–1, 1–4)	(E5) Oswego State	Herb Brooks Arena – Lake Placid, New York; Attendance: 1,538

Chris Czarnota
Goalies
Andrew Hare
Referees:
Joel Dupree
Chris Shepley
Linesmen:
Chris Woodward
Eric Geller

(Thomas, Currier) Pier-Olivier Cotnoir (13) – 00:20	1–0
	1–1	03:18 – Paul Rodrigues (16) (Josepher)
(Hale, Niezgoda) Kyle Thomas (13) – 28:06	2–1
	2–2	29:29 – Tim Carr (3) (Badham, C. Carr)
	2–3	46:14 – Chris Muise (11) (Brown)
	2–4	52:04 – Tyler Leimbrock (12) (Titanic, Muise)
	2–5	53:47 – Matt Singleton (4)
(Mulvey) Corey Hale (1) – 57:49	3–5
	3–6	59:09 – EN – Chris Muise (12) (Brown, Ayotte)

2 min
Penalties
4 min
27
Shots
34

March 15, 2013; 7:30 PM	(E2) Utica	1 – 5 (0–0, 1–2, 0–3)	(W3) Wisconsin–Eau Claire	Herb Brooks Arena – Lake Placid, New York; Attendance: 1,341

Nick Therrien
Goalies
Brandon Stephenson
Referees:
Mike Elam
John Everett
Linesmen:
Fraser McIntyre
Mike Maharey

(Gaffney) Lou Educate (18) – 30:00	1–0
	1–1	33:15 – Jordan Singer (21) (Andersen)
	1–2	33:37 – Ross Andersen (8) (McCabe, Weston)
	1–3	41:29 – Kurt Weston (12) (Callahan, McCabe)
	1–4	53:02 – SH – Kurt Weston (13) (Callahan)
	1–5	57:21 – EN – Ross Andersen (9)

6 min
Penalties
16 min
32
Shots
26

=== National Championship ===
March 16, 2013; 7:00 PM	(W3) Wisconsin–Eau Claire	5 – 3 (1–1, 1–1, 1–4)	(E3) Oswego State	Herb Brooks Arena – Lake Placid, New York; Attendance: 2,089

Brandon Stephenson
Goalies
Andrew Hare
Referees:
John Everett
Mike Elam
Linesmen:
Fraser McIntyre
Chris Woodworth

	0–1	10:44 – Bobby Gertsakis (6) (Moodie, McConney)
	0–2	29:29 – Chris Muise (13) (Brown)
(Donnellan, Darwitz) Jordan Singer (22) – PP – 14:25	1–2
(Darwitz) Andrew Wilcox (6) – 19:07	2–2
(Singer, Wilcox) Daniel Olszewski (7) – 36:29	3–2
(Williams, Waggoner) Devin Mantha (7) – 47:20	4–2
	4–3	50:00 – Bobby Gertsakis (7) (Muise)
(Donnellan) Kurt Weston (14) – EN – 59:01	5–3

10 min
Penalties
4 min
25
Shots
30

== All-Tournament Team ==
- G: Brandon Stephenson (Wisconsin–Eau Claire)
- D: Drew Darwitz (Wisconsin–Eau Claire)
- D: Bobby Gertsakis (Oswego State)
- F: Jordan Singer* (Wisconsin–Eau Claire)
- F: Kurt Weston (Wisconsin–Eau Claire)
- F: Chris Muise (Oswego State)

* Most Outstanding Player(s)

== Record by conference ==
Conference	# of Bids	Record	Win %	Frozen Four	Championship Game	Champions
NCHA	2	4–1	.800	1	1	1
ECAC East	2	2–2	.500	1	-	-
SUNYAC	1	2–1	.667	1	1	-
ECAC West	1	1–1	.500	1	-	-
NESCAC	1	1–1	.500	-	-	-
MIAC	1	0–1	.000	-	-	-
ECAC Northeast	1	0–1	.000	-	-	-
MCHA	1	0–1	.000	-	-	-
MASCAC	1	0–1	.000	-	-	-
