= 2006 NCAA Division III men's ice hockey tournament =

- Teams: 9
- Finals site: First Arena; Elmira, New York
- Champions: Middlebury Panthers (8th title)
- Runner-up: St. Norbert Green Knights (2nd title game)
- Semifinalists: Elmira Soaring Eagles (4th Frozen Four); Hobart Statesmen (1st Frozen Four)
- Winning coach: Bill Beaney (8th title)
- MOP: None (not awarded)
- Attendance: 13,671

The 2006 NCAA Division III Men's Ice Hockey Tournament was the culmination of the 2005–06 season, the 23rd such tournament in NCAA history. It concluded with Middlebury defeating St. Norbert in the championship game 3-0. All First Round and Quarterfinal matchups were held at home team venues, while all succeeding games were played at the First Arena in Elmira, New York.

The tournament was expanded to 10 teams with an additional at-large bid offered to a team judges to be the best who had neither received an automatic bid nor one of the regional at-large bids.

Massachusetts–Dartmouth was the first NCAA tournament game for any team from ECAC Northeast.

== Qualifying teams ==
The following teams qualified for the tournament. Automatic bids were offered to the conference tournament champion of seven different conferences. One at-large bid was available for the best non-conference champion for each region with one additional at-large bid for the best remaining team regardless of region.

East							West						
Seed	School	Conference	Record	Berth Type	Appearance	Last Bid	Seed	School	Conference	Record	Berth Type	Appearance	Last Bid
1	Middlebury	NESCAC	23–2–2	Tournament Champion	12th	2005	1	St. Norbert	NCHA	23–4–3	At–Large	8th	2005
2	Manhattanville	ECAC West	20–4–2	At–Large	2nd	2005	2	Wisconsin–Superior	NCHA	17–9–3	Tournament Champion	11th	2002
3	Norwich	ECAC East	22–4–2	Tournament Champion	8th	2004	3	St. Olaf	MIAC	12–9–5	Tournament Champion	1st	Never
4	Hobart	ECAC West	19–7–0	At–Large	2nd	2004							
5	Elmira	ECAC West	17–8–2	Tournament Champion	10th	2003							
6	Geneseo State	SUNYAC	19–8–2	Tournament Champion	3rd	2005							
7	Massachusetts–Dartmouth	ECAC Northeast	24–4–0	Tournament Champion	1st	Never							

== Format ==
The tournament featured four rounds of play. All rounds were Single-game elimination. For the three eastern Quarterfinals the teams were seeded according to their rankings. The two lowest-seeded eastern teams played a first round game while the remaining five teams received byes into Quarterfinal round. The top-seeded eastern team played the winner of the eastern first round game. For the western quarterfinal, the top-ranked team awaited the winner of a first round game between the lower-ranked teams. The higher-seeded team served as host for each game of the first round and quarterfinals.

== Tournament bracket ==
First Round; March 8
W2	Wisconsin–Superior	2
W3	St. Olaf	1
E6	Geneseo State	2
E7	Massachusetts–Dartmouth	8

Quarterfinals; March 11
W1	St. Norbert	8
W2	Wisconsin–Superior	2
E3	Norwich	1
E4	Hobart	3
E1	Middlebury	3
E7	Massachusetts–Dartmouth	1
E2	Manhattanville	1
E5	Elmira	2**

Semifinals; March 18
W1	St. Norbert	5*
E4	Hobart	4
E1	Middlebury	2
E5	Elmira	1

National Championship; March 19
W1	St. Norbert	0
E1	Middlebury	3

Note: * denotes overtime period(s)

== Record by conference ==
Conference	# of Bids	Record	Win %	Frozen Four	Championship Game	Champions
ECAC West	3	2–3	.400	2	-	-
NCHA	2	3–2	.600	1	1	-
NESCAC	1	3–0	1.000	1	1	1
ECAC Northeast	1	1–1	.500	-	-	-
MIAC	1	0–1	.000	-	-	-
ECAC East	1	0–1	.000	-	-	-
SUNYAC	1	0–1	.000	-	-	-
