= 2010 NCAA Division III men's ice hockey tournament =

College ice hockey tournament

- Teams: 11
- Finals site: Herb Brooks Arena, Lake Placid, New York
- Champions: Norwich Cadets (3rd title)
- Runner-up: St. Norbert Green Knights (4th title game)
- Semifinalists: Oswego State Lakers (4th Frozen Four); Plattsburgh State Cardinals (11th Frozen Four)
- Winning coach: Mike McShane (3rd title)
- MOP: B. J. O'Brien (St. Norbert)
- Attendance: 19,879

The 2010 NCAA Division III Men's Ice Hockey Tournament was the culmination of the 2009–10 season, the 27th such tournament in NCAA history. It concluded with Norwich defeating St. Norbert in the championship game 2–1 in overtime. All First Round and Quarterfinal matchups were held at home team venues, while all succeeding games were played at the Herb Brooks Arena in Lake Placid, New York.

== Qualifying teams ==
The following teams qualified for the tournament. Automatic bids were offered to the conference tournament champion of seven different conferences. Four at-large bids were available for the highest-ranked non-conference tournament champions (overall seed in parentheses). ECAC West, which had fewer than the number of requisite teams (seven) to qualify for an automatic bid for several years, lost its automatic bid.

East							West						
Seed	School	Conference	Record	Berth Type	Appearance	Last Bid	Seed	School	Conference	Record	Berth Type	Appearance	Last Bid
1	Norwich (1)	ECAC East	23–1–4	Tournament Champion	11th	2008	1	St. Norbert (3)	NCHA	21–3–3	Tournament Champion	11th	2008
2	Oswego State (2)	SUNYAC	25–2–0	Tournament Champion	9th	2007	2	Gustavus Adolphus	MIAC	19–6–2	At–Large	5th	2009
3	Middlebury (4)	NESCAC	19–4–4	Tournament Champion	14th	2007	3	St. Thomas	MIAC	13–10–4	Tournament Champion	14th	2008
4	Plattsburgh State	SUNYAC	18–5–4	At–Large	15th	2009	4	Adrian	MCHA	24–3–0	Tournament Champion	1st	Never
5	Bowdoin	NESCAC	19–6–1	At–Large	3rd	2002							
6	Elmira	ECAC West	18–8–1	At–Large	13th	2009							
7	Curry	ECAC Northeast	19–8–1	Tournament Champion	3rd	2005							

== Format ==
The tournament featured four rounds of play. All rounds were Single-game elimination. The top four teams were arranged so that were they all to reach the national semifinal, the first overall seed would play the fourth seed while the second seed would play the third seed. Because only one Western team could have received a bye into the quarterfinals, all western teams played in the first round to prevent lower-seeded teams from having to travel long-distances in the first two rounds. The other first round participants were the two lowest-seeded eastern teams.

The winners of the two western first round matches would play one another in the quarterfinals. The top eastern seed would play the winner of the eastern first-round game while the other two quarterfinal matches were played between eastern teams as follows: the second-seeded eastern team played the fifth-seeded team while the third-seed played the fourth-seed. The higher-seeded team served as host for all first round and quarterfinal meetings.

== Tournament Bracket ==
First Round; March 10
W1	St. Norbert (3)	4
W4	Adrian	3
W2	Gustavus Adolphus	3
W3	St. Thomas	1
E6	Elmira	4
E7	Curry	1

Quarterfinals; March 13
E2	Oswego State (2)	9
E5	Bowdoin	2
W1	St. Norbert (3)	3
W2	Gustavus Adolphus	1
E3	Middlebury (4)	2
E4	Plattsburgh State	3*
E1	Norwich (1)	2*
E6	Elmira	1

Semifinals; March 19
E2	Oswego State (2)	3
W1	St. Norbert (3)	4
E4	Plattsburgh State	2
E1	Norwich (1)	3

National Championship; March 20
W1	St. Norbert (3)	1
E1	Norwich (1)	2*

Note: * denotes overtime period(s)

== Results ==
=== First round ===
March 10, 2010; 7:05 PM	(W1) St. Norbert	4 – 3 (1–1, 3–1, 0–1)	(W4) Adrian	Cornerstone Community Center – Ashwaubenon, Wisconsin; Attendance: 1,329

Game reference

B.J. O'Brien
Goalies
Brad Fogal
Referees:
Mike Gulenchyn
John Boche
Linesman:
Ryan Ourada

	0–1	10:14 – Chris Stansik (8) (Kuzyk, Dahlinger)
(Richardson, Zobak) Cody Keefer (12) – 17:52	1–1
(Joanette) Dustin Walz (1) – 22:07	2–1
(Allen, Wheeler) Matt Boyd (9) – 23:21	3–1
(Bernardy, Ryd) Brandon Longley (10) – 28:36	4–1
	4–2	30:47 – PP – Mike Dahlinger (13) (Kuzyk, Frieday)
	4–3	56:19 – Mike Towns (9) (Workman)

6 min
Penalties
6 min
30
Shots
19

March 10, 2010; 7:05 PM	(W2) Gustavus Adolphus	3 – 1 (1–0, 1–0, 1–1)	(W3) St. Thomas	Lund Arena – St. Peter, Minnesota; Attendance: 1,034

Game reference

Josh Swartout
Goalies
Joe Schraeder
Referees:
Dave Marcotte
Jerry McLaughlin
Linesman:
Mark Engstrom

(Dynan) Brad Wieck (10) – 07:04	1–0
(Leathers, Ridley) Joe Welch (8) – 22:20	2–0
	2–1	53:43 – Parker Burgess (10) (Johnson, Hickey)
(Dynan) Ross Ring-Jarvi (16) – PP – 57:51	3–1

10 min
Penalties
10 min
40
Shots
19

March 10, 2010; 7:00 PM	(E6) Elmira	4 – 1 (1–0, 1–1, 2–0)	(E7) Curry	Murray Athletic Center – Horseheads, New York; Attendance: 700

Game reference

Casey Tuttle
Goalies
Steve Jakiel
Referees:
Michael Jones
Shawn McSweeny
Linesman:
Eric Wallace

(Willard) Mark Morikawa (6) – 14:57	1–0
	1–1	23:27 – Ross Enmark (11) (Williams, Kaneshiro)
(Linden, Willard) Darcy Vaillancourt (19) – PP – 26:20	2–1
(Masters, Sanders) Darcy Vaillancourt (20) – PP – 57:49	3–1
Mark Morikawa (7) – 58:04	4–1

10 min
Penalties
20 min
43
Shots
22

=== Quarterfinals ===
March 13, 2010; 7:00 PM	(E2) Oswego State	9 – 2 (2–1, 5–0, 2–1)	(E5) Bowdoin	Campus Center Ice Arena – Oswego, New York; Attendance: 2,308

Game reference

Kyle Gunn-Taylor
Goalies
Chris Rossi
Richard Nerland
Referees:
Dan Murphy
Chris Shepley
Linesman:
Drew White

	0–1	05:14 – PP – Mike Corbelle (4) (MacCormack)
(Lyon, Dormiedy) Neil Musselwhite (19) – 07:34	1–1
(Selleck, Moodie) Hank Van Boxmeer (2) – 14:38	2–1
(Singleton, Moodie) Hank Van Boxmeer (3) – PP – 24:28	3–1
(Bernardy, Ryd) Neil Musselwhite (20) – PP – 27:34	4–1
Brad Dormiedy (4) – 31:10	5–1
(Dormiedy, Van Boxmeer) Neil Musselwhite (21) – 37:47	6–1
Justin Fox (13) – PP – 39:12	7–1
(Laganiere) Neil Musselwhite (22) – 49:57	8–1
	8–2	50:49 – Rob MacGregor (2) (Shearer-Hardy, Reich)
(Gilchrist, Van Boxmeer) Tyler Leimbrock (9) – 52:50	9–2

16 min
Penalties
14 min
33
Shots
23

March 13, 2010; 7:05 PM	(W1) St. Norbert	3 – 1 (2–1, 0–0, 1–0)	(W2) Gustavus Adolphus	Cornerstone Community Center – Ashwaubenon, Wisconsin; Attendance: 1,717

Game reference

B.J. O'Brien
Goalies
Josh Swartout
Referees:
Steve Olson
Tony Lancette
Linesman:
Dustin Martin

(Astle, Allen) Shane Wheeler (13) – 01:36	1–0
	1–1	10:55 – James Leathers (4) (Ridley, Lee)
(Wheeler, Keefer) Tyler Allen (14) – 19:48	2–1
(Pulak) Brandon Longley (11) – EN – 59:00	3–1

6 min
Penalties
6 min
25
Shots
18

March 13, 2010; 7:00 PM	(E2) Middlebury	2– 3 (OT) (0–1, 1–1, 1–0, 0–1)	(E5) Plattsburgh State	Chip Kenyon '85 Arena – Middlebury, Vermont; Attendance: 2,600

Game reference

John Yanchek
Goalies
Josh Leis

	0–1	10:52 – Kyle Kudroch (14) (Taylor, MacLeod)
	0–2	30:09 – Dylan Clarke (12)
(Strauss) Ken Suchoski (11) – 36:06	1–2
(Townsend) Jak Knelman (4) – PP – 52:59	2–2
	2–3	63:19 – Jared Docking (3) (Taylor)

10 min
Penalties
6 min
23
Shots
32

March 13, 2010; 7:00 PM	(E1) Norwich	2 – 1 (OT) (0–1, 0–0, 1–0, 1–0)	(E6) Elmira	Kreitzberg Arena – Northfield, Vermont; Attendance: 1,721

Game reference

Ryan Klingensmith
Goalies
Casey Tuttle
Referees:
Michael Shea
Joel Dupree
Linesman:
David Cioch

	0–1	07:21 – PP – Kevin Willer (15) (Moore)
(Eskedjian, Scott Schroeder) Steven Schroeder (9) – EA – 59:12	1–1
(Bell) Pier-Olivier Cotnoir (11) – 62:12	2–1

10 min
Penalties
10 min
39
Shots
13

=== Semifinals ===
March 19, 2010; 4:00 PM	(W1) St. Norbert	4 – 3 (1–0, 0–1, 3–2)	(E2) Oswego State	Herb Brooks Arena – Lake Placid, New York; Attendance: 3,061

Game reference

B.J. O'Brien
Goalies
Kyle Gunn-Taylor
Referees:
Dave Marcotte
Mike Jones
Linesman:
Kyle Allen

Johan Ryd (11) – 18:01	1–0
	1–1	37:14 – Neil Musselwhite (23) (Selleck, Fox)
(Keefer) Tyler Allen (15) – PP – 44:18	2–1
	2–2	45:12 – Justin Fox (14) (Laganiere)
(Pulak, Ryd) Sam Tikka (2) – 47:02	3–2
	3–3	57:28 – Jon Whitelaw (12) (Rodrigues, Mallaro)
(Bernardy, Ryd) Cody Keefer (20) – 59:21	4–3

10 min
Penalties
6 min
20
Shots
23

March 19, 2010; 7:30 PM	(E1) Norwich	3 – 2 (1–0, 1–1, 1–1)	(E4) Plattsburgh State	Herb Brooks Arena – Lake Placid, New York

Game reference

Ryan Klingensmith
Goalies
Josh Leis
Referees:
John Everleth
Mike Shea
Linesman:
Drew White

(Mulvey, Fimiani) Craig Serino (6) – 05:24	1–0
	1–1	27:07 – Andrew Willock (7) (Satim, Clarke)
(Serino) Pier-Olivier Cotnoir (12) – 39:04	2–1
Steve Coon (2) – 48:09	3–1
	3–2	53:30 – Mike Kavanagh (5) (Bessing, Wieland)

8 min
Penalties
10 min
35
Shots
31

=== National Championship ===
March 20, 2010; 5:09 PM	(E1) Norwich	2 – 1 (2OT) (1–0, 1–1, 0–0, 0–0, 1–0)	(W1) St. Norbert	Herb Brooks Arena – Lake Placid, New York; Attendance: 5,100

Game reference

Ryan Klingensmith
Goalies
B.J. O'Brien
Referees:
Dave Marcotte
Mike Jones
Linesman:
Drew White

(Cotnoir, Bell) Chad Anderson (13) – PP – 11:30	1–0
	1–1	29:36 – Sam Tikka (3) (Boyd)
(Thomas) Pier-Olivier Cotnoir (13) – 79:29	2–1

12 min
Penalties
8 min
72
Shots
34

== All-Tournament Team ==
- G: Ryan Klingensmith (Norwich)
- G: B. J. O'Brien* (St. Norbert)
- D: Steve Coon (Norwich)
- D: Sam Tikka (St. Norbert)
- F: Chad Anderson (Norwich)
- F: Pier-Olivier Cotnoir (Norwich)
- F: Johan Ryd (St. Norbert)

* Most Outstanding Player(s)

== Record by conference ==
Conference	# of Bids	Record	Win %	Frozen Four	Championship Game	Champions
SUNYAC	2	2–2	.500	2	-	-
MIAC	2	1–2	.333	-	-	-
NESCAC	2	0–2	.000	-	-	-
ECAC East	1	3–0	1.000	1	1	1
NCHA	1	3–1	.750	1	1	-
ECAC West	1	1–1	.500	-	-	-
ECAC Northeast	1	0–1	.000	-	-	-
MCHA	1	0–1	.000	-	-	-
