= 2008 NCAA Division III men's ice hockey tournament =

- Teams: 10
- Finals site: Herb Brooks Arena; Lake Placid, New York
- Champions: St. Norbert Green Knights (1st title)
- Runner-up: Plattsburgh State Cardinals (4th title game)
- Semifinalists: Elmira Soaring Eagles (5th Frozen Four); Norwich Cadets (7th Frozen Four)
- Winning coach: Tim Coghlin (1st title)
- Attendance: 15,842

The 2008 NCAA Division III Men's Ice Hockey Tournament was the culmination of the 2007–08 season, the 25th such tournament in NCAA history. It concluded with St. Norbert defeating Plattsburgh State in the championship game 2-0. All First Round and Quarterfinal matchups were held at home team venues, while all succeeding games were played at the Herb Brooks Arena in Lake Placid, New York.

== Qualifying teams ==
The following teams qualified for the tournament. Automatic bids were offered to the conference tournament champion of seven different conferences. One at-large bid was available for the best non-conference champion for each region with one additional at-large bid for the best remaining team regardless of region.

East							West						
Seed	School	Conference	Record	Berth Type	Appearance	Last Bid	Seed	School	Conference	Record	Berth Type	Appearance	Last Bid
1	Elmira	ECAC West	19–3–5	Tournament Champion	11th	2006	1	St. Norbert	NCHA	24–1–4	Tournament Champion	10th	2007
2	Plattsburgh State	SUNYAC	23–4–0	Tournament Champion	13th	2004	2	St. Thomas	MIAC	19–6–2	Tournament Champion	13th	2005
3	Norwich	ECAC East	22–6–0	Tournament Champion	10th	2007	3	Wisconsin–Stout	NCHA	18–8–3	At–Large	1st	Never
4	Manhattanville	ECAC West	18–6–3	At–Large	4th	2007							
5	Hobart	ECAC West	18–7–2	At–Large	3rd	2006							
6	Massachusetts–Dartmouth	ECAC Northeast	18–8–1	Tournament Champion	3rd	2007							
7	Trinity	NESCAC	15–10–2	Tournament Champion	3rd	2005							

== Format ==
The tournament featured four rounds of play. All rounds were Single-game elimination. For the three eastern Quarterfinals the teams were seeded according to their rankings. The two lowest-seeded eastern teams played a first round game while the remaining five teams received byes into Quarterfinal round. The top-seeded eastern team played the winner of the eastern first round game. For the western quarterfinal, the top-ranked team awaited the winner of a first round game between the lower-ranked teams. The higher-seeded team served as host for each game of the first round and quarterfinals.

== Tournament Bracket ==
First Round; March 12
W2	St. Thomas	4
W3	Wisconsin–Stout	1
E6	Massachusetts–Dartmouth	3
E7	Trinity	7

Quarterfinals; March 15
W1	St. Norbert	2*
W2	St. Thomas	1
E3	Norwich	3
E4	Manhattanville	0
E1	Elmira	6
E7	Trinity	1
E2	Plattsburgh State	5
E5	Hobart	2

Semifinals; March 22
W1	St. Norbert	3
E3	Norwich	0
E1	Elmira	1
E2	Plattsburgh State	6

National Championship; March 23
W1	St. Norbert	2
E2	Plattsburgh State	0

Note: * denotes overtime period(s)

== Record by conference ==
Conference	# of Bids	Record	Win %	Frozen Four	Championship Game	Champions
ECAC West	3	1–3	.250	1	-	-
NCHA	2	3–1	.750	1	1	1
SUNYAC	1	2–1	.667	1	1	-
ECAC East	1	1–1	.500	1	-	-
NESCAC	1	1–1	.500	-	-	-
MIAC	1	1–1	.500	-	-	-
ECAC Northeast	1	0–1	.000	-	-	-
