= 2018 NCAA Division III men's ice hockey tournament =

- Teams: 12
- Finals site: Herb Brooks Arena, Lake Placid, New York
- Champions: St. Norbert Green Knights (5th title)
- Runner-up: Salve Regina Seahawks (1st title game)
- Semifinalists: Colby Mules (1st Frozen Four); Wisconsin–Stevens Point Pointers (10th Frozen Four)
- Winning coach: Tim Coghlin (5th title)
- MOP: Tanner Froese (St. Norbert)
- Attendance: 10,933

The 2018 NCAA Division III Men's Ice Hockey Tournament was the culmination of the 2017–18 season, the 35th such tournament in NCAA history. It concluded with St. Norbert defeating Salve Regina in the championship game 3–2 in double overtime. All First Round and Quarterfinal matchups were held at home team venues, while all succeeding games were played at the Herb Brooks Arena in Lake Placid, New York.

== Qualifying teams ==
Twelve teams qualified for the tournament in the following ways: (Pool A) seven teams received bids as a result of being conference tournament champions from conferences that possessed an automatic bid. (Pool B) one team was selected from two conferences that did not possess an automatic bid. (Pool C) four teams from conferences that possessed an automatic bid received at-large invitations based upon their records.

East							West						
Seed	School	Conference	Record	Berth Type	Appearance	Last Bid	Seed	School	Conference	Record	Berth Type	Appearance	Last Bid
1	Salve Regina	CCC	20–5–2	At–Large (C)	2nd	2016	1	St. Norbert	NCHA	24–4–1	Tournament Champion	18th	2017
2	University of New England	CCC	20–5–3	At–Large (C)	1st	Never	2	Adrian	NCHA	24–5–0	At–Large (C)	8th	2017
3	Hobart	NEHC	18–5–5	Tournament Champion	8th	2017	3	Wisconsin–Stevens Point	WIAC	20–5–3	At–Large (B)	14th	2017
4	Nichols	CCC	17–8–3	Tournament Champion	4th	2015	4	Augsburg	MIAC	18–9–0	Tournament Champion	5th	2017
5	Fitchburg State	MASCAC	18–6–3	Tournament Champion	1st	Never	5	Marian	NCHA	20–7–1	At–Large (C)	1st	Never
6	Geneseo State	SUNYAC	19–5–3	Tournament Champion	6th	2016							
7	Colby	NESCAC	15–10–2	Tournament Champion	2nd	1996							

== Format ==
The tournament featured four rounds of play. All rounds were Single-game elimination.

Because at least four western teams qualified, the tournament was arranged so that there were two eastern and two western quarterfinal brackets. The top two teams from each region were placed in separate quarterfinal brackets and then arranged so that were all to reach the semifinals the top western seed would play the second eastern seed and vice versa.

Since five western teams and seven eastern teams qualified for the tournament, three western teams received byes into the quarterfinal round while one eastern team was advanced to the second round. In the first round, the fourth- and fifth-seeded western teams played with the winner advancing to play the top western seed. The second- and third-seeded western teams would play one another in the other western quarterfinal bracket.

The eastern teams were arranged so that the second seed would play the seventh seed, the third seed would play the sixth seed and the fourth seed would play the fifth seed. The winner between the fourth- and fifth-seeded eastern teams would play the top eastern seed while the winner between the third- and sixth-seeded eastern teams would play the victor of the second- and seventh-seeded match.

In the First Round and Quarterfinals the higher-seeded team served as host.

== Tournament Bracket ==
First Round; March 10
E4	Nichols	3
E5	Fitchburg State	1
W4	Augsburg	3
W5	Marian	1
E2	University of New England	2
E7	Colby	4
E3	Hobart	2
E6	Geneseo State	4

Quarterfinals; March 17
W2	Adrian	2
W3	Wisconsin–Stevens Point	5
E1	Salve Regina	4
E4	Nichols	3
W1	St. Norbert (1)	5
W4	Augsburg	2
E7	Colby	2
E6	Geneseo State	1

Semifinals; March 23
W3	Wisconsin–Stevens Point	0
E1	Salve Regina	3
W1	St. Norbert (1)	4
E7	Colby	3

National Championship; March 24
E1	Salve Regina	2
W1	St. Norbert (1)	3**

Note: * denotes overtime period(s)

== Results ==
=== First round ===
March 10, 2018; 7:00 PM	(E4) Nichols	3 – 1 (1–0, 0–0, 2–1)	(E8) Fitchburg State	June Rockwell Levy Rink – Burrillville, Rhode Island; Attendance: 505

Game reference

Colin Brennan
Goalies
Brian McGrath
Referees:
Andrew Spinali
Eric Doyle
Linesmen:
Lex Deegan
Chad Curtiss

(Roche, Baker) Vincent Crivello (15) – EA – 04:12	1–0
(Menta, Spencer) Scott Cuthrell (13) – 46:32	2–0
	2–1	50:38 – PP – Christopher Vicario (13) (DiNicola, Warila)
Chris Deming (7) – EN – 59:02	3–1

4 min
Penalties
10 min
42
Shots
19

March 10, 2018; 7:00 PM	(W4) Augsburg	3 – 1 (2–0, 0–0, 1–1)	(W5) Marian	Augsburg Ice Arena – Minneapolis, Minnesota; Attendance: 449

Game reference

Nick Schmit
Goalies
Hunter Vorva
Referees:
Jason Swenson
Mike Elam
Linesmen:
Eric Thom
Taylor Vichorek

(Flynn, Anderson) Luke Dietsch (11) – 10:24	1–0
(Flynn, Anderson) Matt Nehls (3) – 11:04	2–0
	2–1	56:15 – PP – Connor Blanck (11) (Howie)
Drew Anderson (8) – EN – 59:27	3–1

10 min
Penalties
21 min
30
Shots
33

March 10, 2018; 7:00 PM	(E2) University of New England	2 – 4 (1–0, 1–3, 0–1)	(E7) Colby	Alfond Rink – Waterville, Maine; Attendance: 926

Game reference

Tate Sproxton
Goalies
Sean Lawrence
Referees:
Michael Pleau
Jay Durfee
Linesmen:
Brian Fagan
Jesse Burns

(Fleurent, Seltenreich) Ryan Bloom (19) – PP – 04:00	1–0
	1–1	29:04 – Kienan Scott (6) (O'Connor, Leprine)
(Mecrones, Jones) Liam Neuman (6) – 29:34	2–1
	2–2	32:26 – PP – Michael Rudolf (9) (MacDonald, Grillo)
	2–3	35:58 – SH – Kienan Scott (7) (O'Connor)
	2–4	35:58 – Joe Schuler (4)

8 min
Penalties
6 min
35
Shots
30

March 10, 2018; 7:00 PM	(E3) Hobart	2 – 4 (0–2, 1–1, 1–1)	(E6) Geneseo State	Ira S. Wilson Ice Arena – Geneseo, New York; Attendance: 935

Game reference

Frank Oplinger
Goalies
Devin McDonald
Referees:
Joel Dupree
Derek Sylvester
Linesmen:
Eric Geller
Rick Lembo

	0–1	01:05 – Sotiris Athanasopoulos (2) (Bosio)
	0–2	05:06 – Joe Serpico (2) (Bosio)
	0–3	32:36 – Dan Bosio (5) (Marra, Campion)
(Harrison) Andrew Silard (4) – 29:46	1–3
(Faulkner) Cam Shaheen (4) – 42:34	2–3
	2–4	55:08 – Carson Kelley (10) (Gordon, Lynes)

4 min
Penalties
2 min
38
Shots
27

=== Quarterfinals ===
March 17, 2018; 7:00 PM	(W2) Adrian	2 – 5 (1–3, 1–1, 0–1)	(W3) Wisconsin–Stevens Point	Arrington Ice Arena – Adrian, Michigan; Attendance: 942

Game reference

Kevin Entmaa
Dillon Kelley
Goalies
Max Milosek
Referees:
Erik Smevoll
Joshua Hatinger
Linesmen:
Michael Verdonck
Joseph Guzzardi

	0–1	01:09 – Kelly O'Brien (3) (Roo, Beauvais)
	0–2	11:37 – Zach Zech (7) (Raver)
	0–3	16:08 – Zach Zech (8) (Raver, Fredericks)
(Thompson, Colatarci) Taylor McCloy (24) – 19:41	1–3
(Yim) Trevor Boyd (17) – 31:20	2–3
	2–4	36:42 – Nathan Harris (3) (Miller, Roo)
	2–5	59:28 – EN – Brennen Miller (10) (Duffin, Kelly)

8 min
Penalties
2 min
34
Shots
39

March 17, 2018; 7:00 PM	(E1) Salve Regina	4 – 3 (2–2, 1–0, 1–1)	(E4) Nichols	June Rockwell Levy Rink – Burrillville, Rhode Island; Attendance: 719

Game reference

Blake Wojtala
Goalies
Colin Brennan
Referees:
Lex Deegan
Casey Tererri
Linesmen:
Jared Waitt
Sam Schildkraut

(Eruzione, Boutoussov) John McLean (7) – 00:32	1–0
	1–1	56:15 – Vincent Crivello (16) (Davidson, Campbell)
(Thompson) Erik Udahl (12) – PP – 15:53	2–1
	2–2	16:09 – Matthew Menta (8) (Cuthrell, Baker)
(Eruzione, McLean) Frankie Sullivan (5) – 38:05	3–2
	3–3	47:02 – PP – Filip Virgili (7) (Roche, Campbell)
(Eruzione) Frankie Sullivan (6) – 55:39	4–3

8 min
Penalties
6 min
34
Shots
26

March 17, 2018; 7:05 PM	(W1) St. Norbert	5 – 2 (2–0, 1–2, 2–0)	(W4) Augsburg	Cornerstone Community Center – Ashwaubenon, Wisconsin; Attendance: 1,641

Game reference

T.J. Black
Goalies
Nick Schmit
Referees:
John Boche
Jerry McLaughlin
Linesmen:
Shane Dillon
Pat Courtney

(Yates, Johansson) Luke Karakas (4) – 06:25	1–0
(Sacco, LeSage) Chris Rygus (2) – 14:53	2–0
(Sacco, Pung) Peter Bates (11) – 20:28	3–0
	3–1	23:11 – Chandler Madry (7) (Larson, Rodriguez)
	3–2	28:44 – Luke Dietsch (12) (Flynn, Anderson)
(Phillips, Sacco) Timmy Nicksic (6) – 51:04	4–2
(Nicksic, Johansson) Keegan Milligan (12) – EN – 58:45	5–2

4 min
Penalties
6 min
36
Shots
25

March 17, 2018; 7:00 PM	(E6) Geneseo State	1 – 2 (0–0, 0–1, 1–1)	(E7) Colby	Ira S. Wilson Ice Arena – Geneseo, New York; Attendance: 1,224

Game reference

Devin McDonald
Goalies
Sean Lawrence
Referees:
Will O'Malley
Michael Pleau
Linesmen:
Brian Oliver
Jordan Patarino

	0–1	20:40 – Thomas Stahlhuth (3) (Grillo, Rudolf)
(Romano, Ferguson) Arthur Gordon (9) – PP – 48:18	1–1
	1–2	59:58 – Justin Grillo (7) (Stahlhuth, MacDonald)

8 min
Penalties
8 min
39
Shots
25

=== Semifinals ===
March 23, 2018; 3:00 PM	(E1) Salve Regina	3 – 0 (1–0, 1–0, 1–0)	(W3) Wisconsin–Stevens Point	Herb Brooks Arena – Lake Placid, New York; Attendance: 556

Game reference

Blake Wojtala
Goalies
Max Milosek
Referees:
Eric Doyle
John Boche
Linesmen:
Chad Curtiss
Sam Schildkraut

Erik Udahl (13) – 18:35	1–0
(Thompson, Cyr) Erik Udahl (14) – PP – 33:50	2–0
(McLean) Danny Philbrick (2) – EN – 57:32	3–0

6 min
Penalties
6 min
20
Shots
55

March 23, 2018; 6:35 PM	(W1) St. Norbert	4 – 3 (3–0, 1–2, 0–1)	(E7) Colby	Herb Brooks Arena – Lake Placid, New York; Attendance: 1,762

Game reference

T.J. Black
Goalies
Sean Lawrence
Referees:
Mike Pleau
Joshua Hatinger
Linesmen:
Eric Geller
Rick Lembo

(LeSage, Christensen) Roman Uchyn (9) – 01:28	1–0
(Phillips) Dominick Sacco (7) – 02:35	2–0
(Bates) Tanner Froese (13) – 11:33	3–0
	3–1	35:04 – J.P. Schuhlen (6) (Scott, Leprine)
	3–2	37:56 – PP – Cam MacDonald (16) (Stahlhuth, Decker)
Tanner Froese (14) – 39:25	4–2
	4–3	54:08 – Justin Grillo (8) (Rudolf)

8 min
Penalties
4 min
47
Shots
43

=== National Championship ===
March 24, 2018; 7:00 PM	(E1) St. Norbert	3 – 2 (2OT) (1–0, 1–1, 0–1, 0–0, 1–0)	(E1) Salve Regina	Herb Brooks Arena – Lake Placid, New York; Attendance: 1,830

Game reference

T.J. Black
Goalies
Blake Wojtala
Referees:
Eric Doyle
Josh Hatinger
Linesmen:
Eric Geller
Rick Lembo

(Froese, Bates) Dominick Sacco (12) – PP – 18:31	1–0
(Froese, Bates) Luke Davison (6) – PP – 32:25	2–0
	2–1	33:30 – SH – Cameron Russo (4) (Thompson, Sullivan)
	2–2	50:35 – Paul Boutoussov (15) (Sullivan)
(Froese, Johansson) Bradley Pung (8) – 89:42	3–2

6 min
Penalties
9 min
50
Shots
43

== All-Tournament Team ==
- G: Blake Wojtala (Salve Regina)
- D: Luke Davison (St. Norbert)
- D: Vincenzo Renda (Salve Regina)
- F: Dominick Sacco (St. Norbert)
- F: Erik Udahl (Salve Regina)
- F: Tanner Froese* (St. Norbert)

* Most Outstanding Player(s)

== Record by conference ==
Conference	# of Bids	Record	Win %	Frozen Four	Championship Game	Champions
NCHA	3	3–2	.600	1	1	1
CCC	3	3–3	.500	1	1	-
NESCAC	1	2–1	.667	1	-	-
WIAC	1	1–1	.500	1	-	-
SUNYAC	1	1–1	.500	-	-	-
MIAC	1	1–1	.500	-	-	-
NEHC	1	0–1	.000	-	-	-
MASCAC	1	0–1	.000	-	-	-
