= 2012 NCAA Division III men's ice hockey tournament =

- Teams: 11
- Finals site: Herb Brooks Arena, Lake Placid, New York
- Champions: St. Norbert Green Knights (3rd title)
- Runner-up: Oswego State Lakers (4th title game)
- Semifinalists: Amherst Lord Jeffs (1st Frozen Four); Norwich Cadets (10th Frozen Four)
- Winning coach: Tim Coghlin (3rd title)
- MOP: David Jacobson (St. Norbert)
- Attendance: 17,749

The 2012 NCAA Division III Men's Ice Hockey Tournament was the culmination of the 2011–12 season, the 29th such tournament in NCAA history. It concluded with St. Norbert defeating Oswego State in the championship game 4-1. All First Round and Quarterfinal matchups were held at home team venues, while all succeeding games were played at the Herb Brooks Arena in Lake Placid, New York.

This tournament is notable for the fact that no team scored more than 1 goal in any losing effort.

== Qualifying teams ==
The following teams qualified for the tournament. Automatic bids were offered to the conference tournament champion of eight different conferences. Three at-large bids were available for the highest-ranked non-conference tournament champions (overall seed in parentheses).

East							West						
Seed	School	Conference	Record	Berth Type	Appearance	Last Bid	Seed	School	Conference	Record	Berth Type	Appearance	Last Bid
1	Norwich (1)	ECAC East	23–2–2	Tournament Champion	13th	2011	1	St. Norbert	NCHA	17–5–5	Tournament Champion	13th	2011
2	Oswego State (2)	SUNYAC	22–3–2	At–Large	11th	2011	2	Gustavus Adolphus	MIAC	16–6–5	Tournament Champion	6th	2010
3	Amherst (3)	NESCAC	23–3–1	Tournament Champion	3rd	2009	3	MSOE	MCHA	22–6–1	Tournament Champion	1st	Never
4	Plattsburgh State (4)	SUNYAC	19–4–4	Tournament Champion	17th	2011	4	St. Thomas	MIAC	18–5–2	At–Large	15th	2010
5	Elmira	ECAC West	15–8–3	At–Large	15th	2011							
6	Plymouth State	MASCAC	17–6–3	Tournament Champion	1st	Never							
7	Wentworth	ECAC Northeast	20–6–1	Tournament Champion	5th	2004							

== Format ==
The tournament featured four rounds of play. All rounds were Single-game elimination. The top four ranked teams received byes into the quarterfinal round and were arranged so that were they all to reach the national semifinal, the second seed would play the third seed.

Because the top four ranked teams were all eastern teams, all four western participants were placed in the same quarterfinal bracket. The teams were arranged to that the top western seed would play the fourth western seed while the second western seed would play the third western seed all in the first round. The winners would advance to the same quarterfinal match and the winner would advance to play the winner of the eastern quarterfinal that possessed the top eastern seed.

The remaining three quarterfinal brackets were arranged as follows: the two lowest ranked eastern teams would play in the first round with the winner advancing to play the top eastern seed, the second eastern seed would play the fifth eastern seed and the third eastern seed would play the fourth eastern seed in the quarterfinals.

In the First Round and Quarterfinals the higher-seeded team served as host.

== Tournament Bracket ==
First Round; March 7
E6	Plymouth State	1
E7	Wentworth	3
W1	St. Norbert	3
W4	St. Thomas	1
W2	Gustavus Adolphus	3
W3	MSOE	1

Quarterfinals; March 10
E1	Norwich (1)	3
E7	Wentworth	0
W1	St. Norbert	4
W2	Gustavus Adolphus	1
E2	Oswego State (2)	5
E5	Elmira	0
E3	Amherst (3)	3
E4	Plattsburgh State (4)	1

Semifinals; March 16
E1	Norwich (1)	1
W1	St. Norbert	4
E2	Oswego State (2)	2*
E3	Amherst (3)	1

National Championship; March 17
W1	St. Norbert	4
E2	Oswego State (2)	1

Note: * denotes overtime period(s)

== Results ==
=== First round ===
March 7, 2012; 7:00 PM	(E6) Plymouth State	1 – 3 (0–0, 1–0, 0–3)	(E7) Wentworth	Plymouth State University Ice Arena – Holderness, New Hampshire; Attendance: 900

Jack Åstedt
Goalies
Alex Peck
Referees:
Tom Cronin
Ken Gates
Linesmen:
Charles Sisson
Kyle Gates

(Richardson, Zobak) Chris Zaremba (11) – PP – 34:45	1–0
	1–1	42:21 – PP – Reed Rushing (4) (Domsodi, Jameson)
	1–2	48:03 – PP – Mike Paglino (4)
	1–3	59:54 – EN – Kevin Crowe (12)

10 min
Penalties
10 min
17
Shots
22

March 7, 2012; 7:05 PM	(W1) St. Norbert	3 – 1 (0–1, 2–0, 1–0)	(W4) St. Thomas	Cornerstone Community Center – Ashwaubenon, Wisconsin; Attendance: 1,233

David Jacobson
Goalies
Drew Fielding

	0–1	11:32 – William Rose (2) (O'Donnell)
(Bradshaw) Zach McDonald (2) – 33:48	1–1
(Ryd) Cody Keefer (14) – PP – 43:33	2–1
(Ryd) Cody Keefer (15) – 49:31	3–1

12 min
Penalties
10 min
24
Shots
24

March 7, 2012; 7:00 PM	(W2) Gustavus Adolphus	3 – 1 (1–1, 1–0, 1–0)	(W3) MSOE	Lund Arena – St. Peter, Minnesota; Attendance: 1,052

John McLean
Goalies
Connor Toomey

	0–1	06:41 – PP – Todd Krupa (15) (Brunk, Pao)
(Erickson) Ross Ring-Jarvi (11) – 08:27	1–1
(Paulsen, Ring-Jarvi) Ryan Johnson (10) – PP – 24:00	2–1
(Ring-Jarvi, Kravtchouk) Nathan Paulsen (4) – EN – 59:57	3–1

12 min
Penalties
8 min
31
Shots
17

=== Quarterfinals ===
March 10, 2012; 7:00 PM	(E1) Norwich	3 – 0 (1–0, 2–0, 0–0)	(E7) Wentworth	Kreitzberg Arena – Holderness, New Hampshire; Attendance: 1,677

Parker Carroll
Goalies
Alex Peck

(Thieda) Chris Duszynski (10) – 00:20	1–0
(Forkey, Lindensmith) Kyle Thomas (16) – 22:38	2–0
(Thieda, Thomas) Pier-Olivier Cotnoir (21) – PP – 34:03	3–0

8 min
Penalties
6 min
24
Shots
19

March 10, 2012; 7:05 PM	(W1) St. Norbert	4 – 1 (1–1, 1–0, 2–0)	(W2) Gustavus Adolphus	Cornerstone Community Center – Ashwaubenon, Wisconsin; Attendance: 1,664

David Jacobson
Goalies
John McLean

(Soley, Perry) Cullen Bradshaw (7) – 04:02	1–0
	1–1	06:24 – PP – Tim LaBombard (2) (May, Ring-Jarvi)
(Soley) Cullen Bradshaw (8) – 28:26	2–1
(Perry, Fiala) Alain Joanette (8) – PP – 46:45	3–1
Joe Perry (9) – 51:21	4–1

10 min
Penalties
16 min
39
Shots
14

March 10, 2012; 7:00 PM	(E2) Oswego State	5 – 0 (1–0, 0–0, 4–0)	(E5) Elmira	Campus Center Ice Arena – Oswego, New York; Attendance: 1,748

Andrew Hare
Goalies
Darren McDonald

(Leimbrock, Muise) Ian Boots (8) – 11:31	1–0
Matt Singleton (5) – 43:03	2–0
(Farris, Mather) Ian Boots (9) – SH – 46:19	3–0
(Whitelaw, Moodie) Zack Josepher (4) – PP – 51:53	4–0
(Singleton, Badham) Chris Ayotte (8) – 53:55	5–0

8 min
Penalties
6 min
22
Shots
23

March 10, 2012; 7:30 PM	(E3) Amherst	3 – 1 (0–1, 3–0, 0–0)	(E4) Plattsburgh State	Orr Rink – Amherst, Massachusetts; Attendance: 975

Jonathan LaRose
Goalies
Mathieu Cadieux

	0–1	03:00 – Alex Jensen (6) (Constantine, Docking)
(Colp) Eddie Effinger (9) – 26:28	1–1
(Cashman, J. Deutsch) Aaron Deutsch (4) – 34:28	2–1
(Moher, A. Deutsch) Eddie Effinger (10) – PP – 46:34	3–1

6 min
Penalties
8 min
30
Shots
28

=== Semifinals ===
March 16, 2012; 4:00 PM	(E1) Norwich	1 – 4 (0–1, 0–1, 1–3)	(W1) St. Norbert	Herb Brooks Arena – Lake Placid, New York; Attendance: 2,100

Parker Carroll
Goalies
David Jacobson

	0–1	18:20 – PP – Joe Perry (10) (Ryd, Soley)
	0–2	31:45 – Chris Rial (4) (Dougherty, Joanette)
	0–3	44:56 – Seth Soley (14) (Fiala, McDonald)
(Cotnoir) Blake Forkey (6) – PP – 54:33	1–3
	1–4	59:50 – SH – EN – Kyle Stroh (11)

18 min
Penalties
23 min
27
Shots
23

March 16, 2012; 7:30 PM	(E2) Oswego State	2 – 1 (OT) (0–0, 0–0, 1–1, 1–0)	(E3) Amherst	Herb Brooks Arena – Lake Placid, New York; Attendance: 3,100

Andrew Hare
Goalies
Jonathan LaRose

Ian Boots (13) – 50:26	1–0
	1–1	59:38 – EA – Eddie Effinger (11) (A. Deutsch, Colp)
(Moodie) Paul Rodrigues (14) – 67:20	2–1

2 min
Penalties
4 min
27
Shots
44

=== National Championship ===
March 17, 2012; 7:00 PM	(E1) St. Norbert	4 – 1 (2–1, 1–0, 1–0)	(W1) Oswego State	Herb Brooks Arena – Lake Placid, New York; Attendance: 3,300

David Jacobson
Goalies
Andrew Hare

Cody Keefer (16) – 00:17	1–0
	1–1	10:47 – David Titanic (4) (Brown)
(Campbell, Baptista) Brandon Hoogenboom (5) – 17:29	2–1
(Ryd, Stroh) Cody Keefer (17) – PP – 38:23	3–1
(Ekström) Cody Keefer (18) – 57:07	4–1

12 min
Penalties
10 min
25
Shots
30

== All-Tournament Team ==
- G: David Jacobson* (St. Norbert)
- D: Mike Baran (Amherst)
- D: Zach McDonald (St. Norbert)
- F: Ian Boots (Oswego State)
- F: Cody Keefer (St. Norbert)
- F: Johan Ryd (St. Norbert)

* Most Outstanding Player(s)

== Record by conference ==
Conference	# of Bids	Record	Win %	Frozen Four	Championship Game	Champions
SUNYAC	2	2–2	.500	1	1	-
MIAC	2	1–2	.333	-	-	-
NCHA	1	4–0	1.000	1	1	1
ECAC East	1	1–1	.500	1	-	-
NESCAC	1	1–1	.500	1	-	-
ECAC Northeast	1	1–1	.500	-	-	-
ECAC West	1	0–1	.000	-	-	-
MCHA	1	0–1	.000	-	-	-
MASCAC	1	0–1	.000	-	-	-
