= Herb Brooks Arena =

Venue in Lake Placid, New York

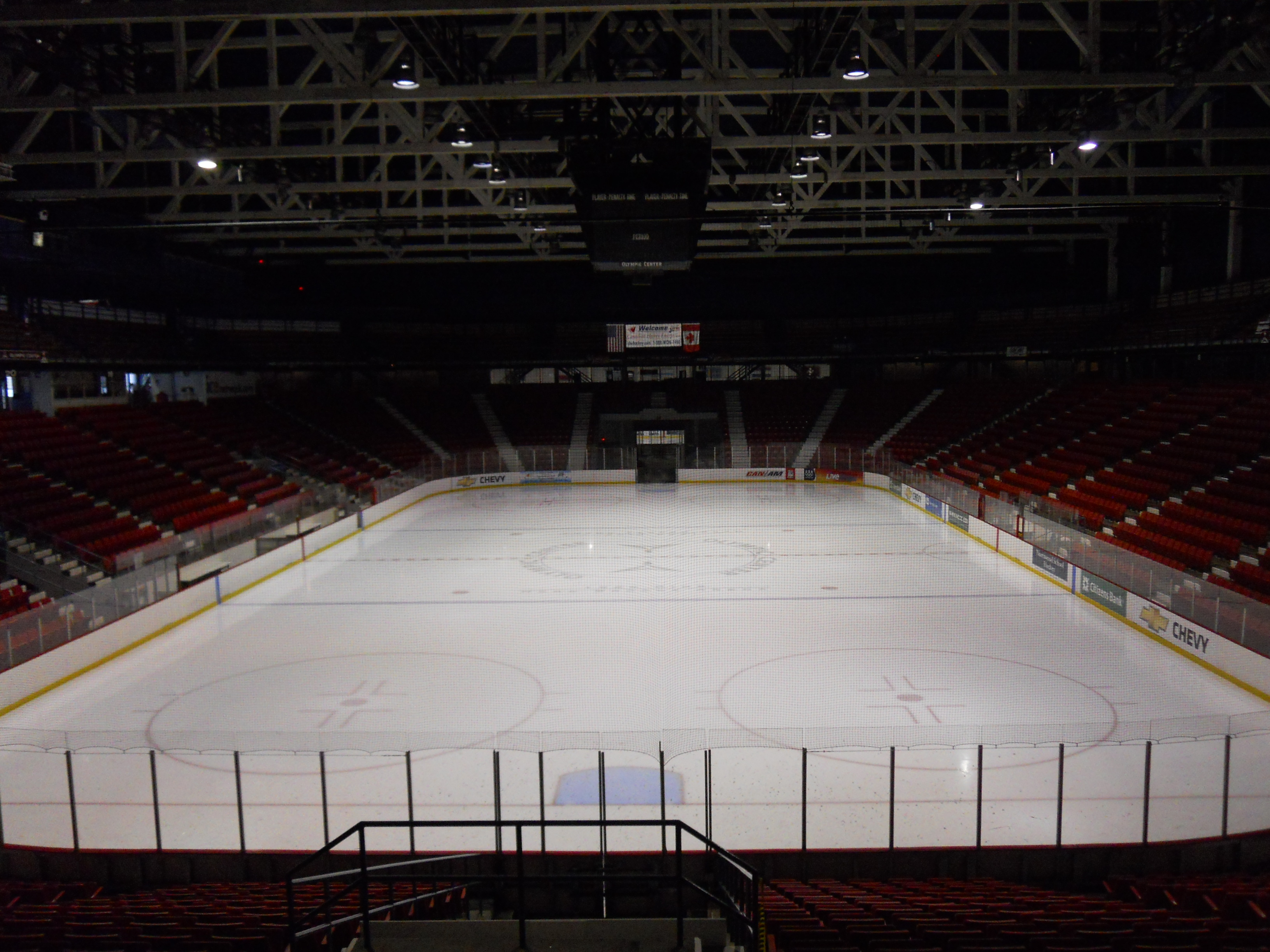
- Interior of arena (2010)
- Interactive map of Herb Brooks Arena
- Full name: 1980 Rink – Herb Brooks Arena
- Former names: Field House International Ice Rink (1980); Olympic Center Ice Rink (1980-2002); Verizon Sports Complex Arena (2002-05)
- Address: 2634 Main St; Lake Placid, NY 12946-3648
- Location: Lake Placid Olympic Center
- Coordinates: 44°17′00″N 073°59′08″W
- Owner: Town of North Elba
- Capacity: 7,700
- Record attendance: 11,000

Construction
- Groundbreaking: Spring 1975
- Opened: September 20, 1979
- Architect: Hellmuth, Obata & Kassabaum
- Project managers: Funk & Wilcox
- General contractor: Gilbane Building Company

Herb Brooks Arena is a multi-purpose arena at the Olympic Center in Lake Placid, New York. The arena, along with the USA Rink, was built for the 1980 Winter Olympics.

== History ==
The arena hosted various events during the 1980 Winter Olympics, most famously the ice hockey tournament that saw the United States' 4–3 victory over the Soviet Union, the game commonly referred to as the Miracle on Ice. In 2005, to commemorate the 25th anniversary of the American victory, the arena was named after the late Herb Brooks, who coached the American team during the 1980 Olympics. Other events the arena hosted during the 1980 games include figure skating events and the closing ceremony.

The arena has been used several times for college hockey championships in the United States. It hosted the 1984 and 1988 men's NCAA Men's Ice Hockey Championship, commonly referred to as the Frozen Four. The arena has hosted the NCAA Women's Ice Hockey Championship as well, in 2007. From 1993 to 2002, the arena annually hosted the ECAC Hockey League's championships every March. The ECAC announced in July 2012 that the league would again crown its champion in Herb Brooks Arena for the 2013–14, 2014–15, and 2015–16 seasons. In March 2016 the contract was extended for another three years through the 2019 ECAC tournament. The 2020 ECAC tournament, planned for the Arena, was cancelled due to the COVID-19 pandemic and the 2021 edition was held at People's United Center before the ECAC tournament returned to Herb Brooks Arena beginning in 2021.

The Glens Falls-based Adirondack Thunder ice hockey team have used the arena for a few games because of high school basketball championship games being held at the Glens Falls Civic Center.

Over a two-week period in late January through early February 2021, the National Women's Hockey League held its 2020–21 season at the arena in an isolation bubble due to the COVID-19 pandemic.

== Gallery ==
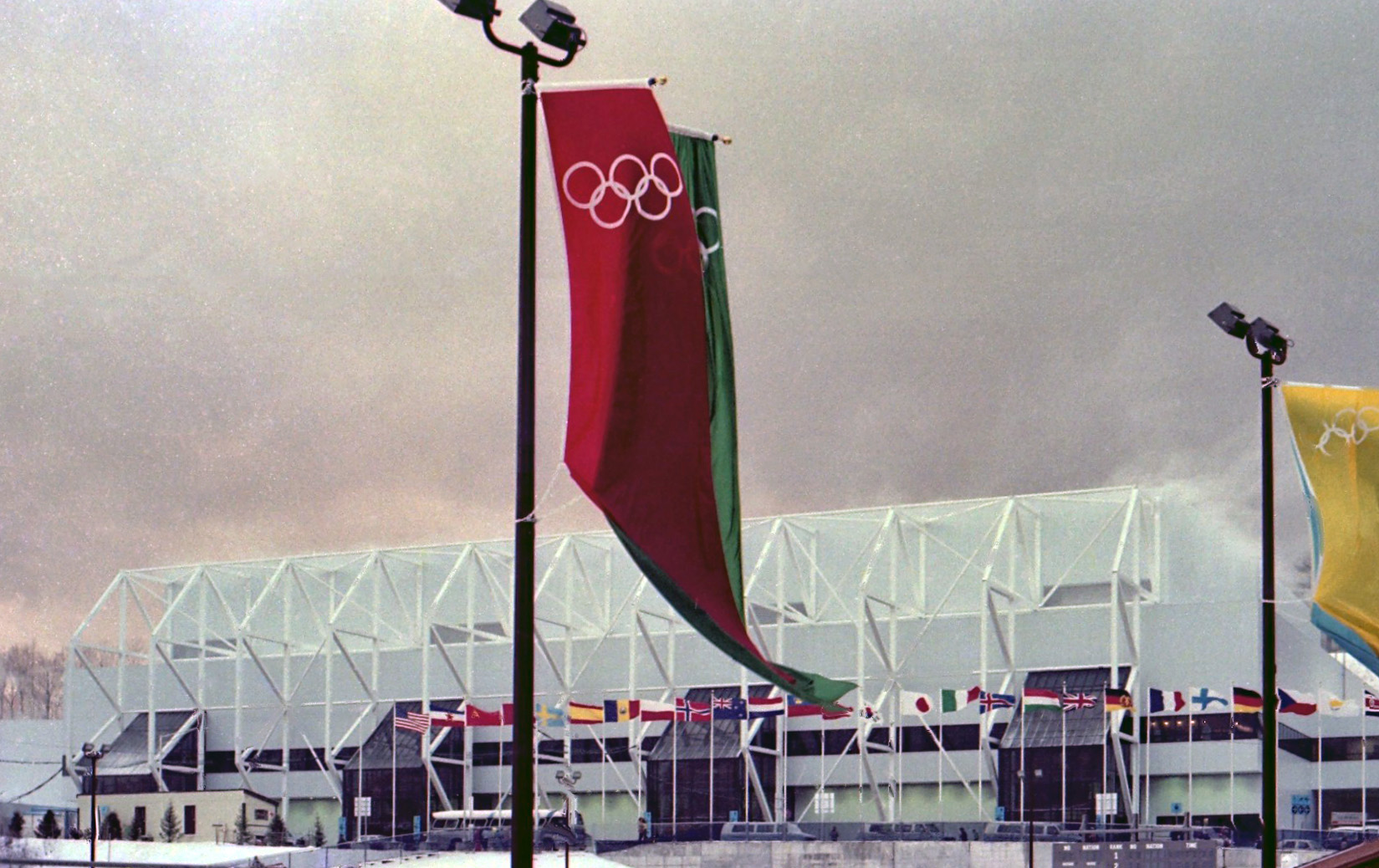
Outside the arena during the 1980 Winter Olympics.

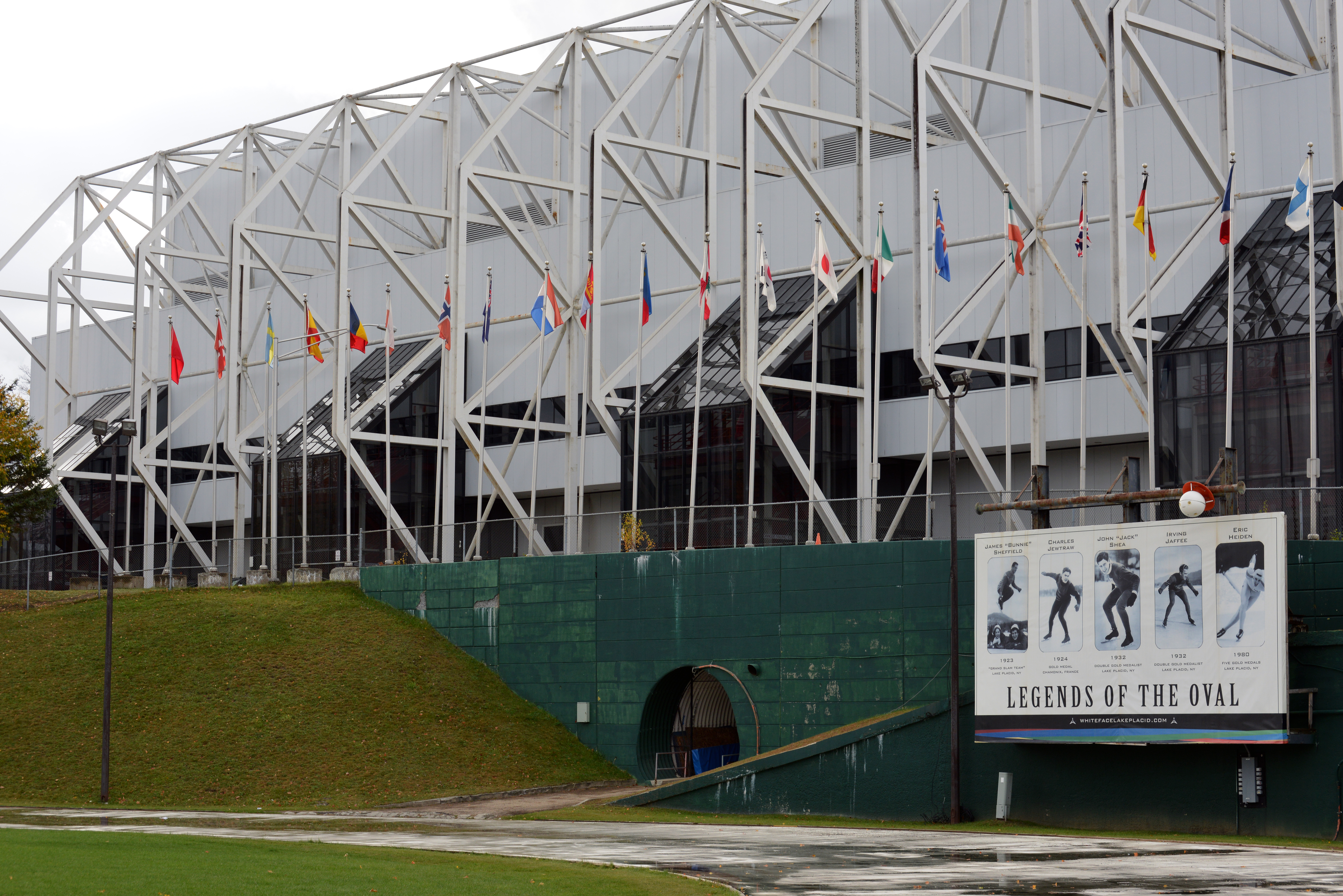
The arena as seen in 2014.

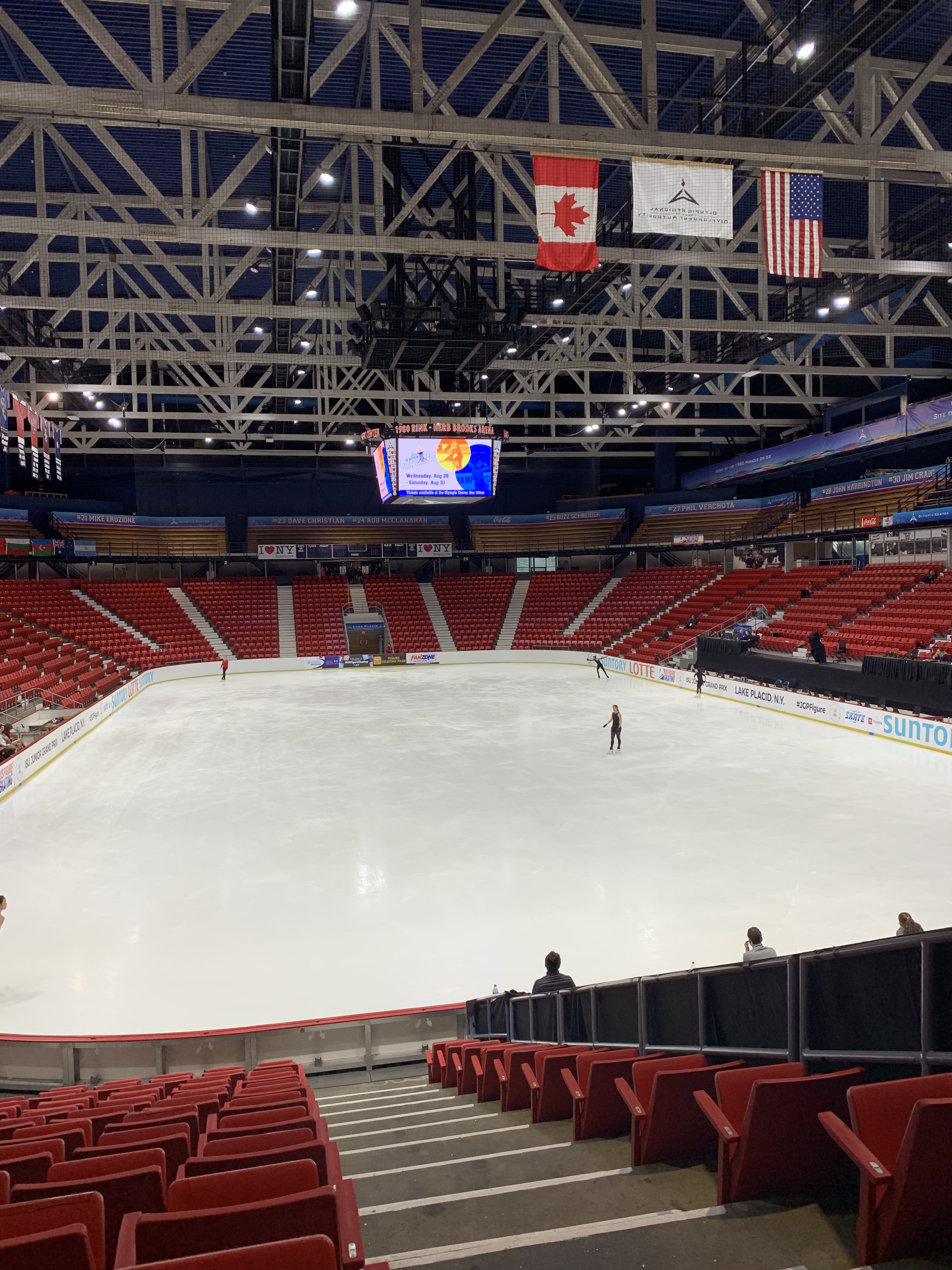
Inside the arena in 2019.

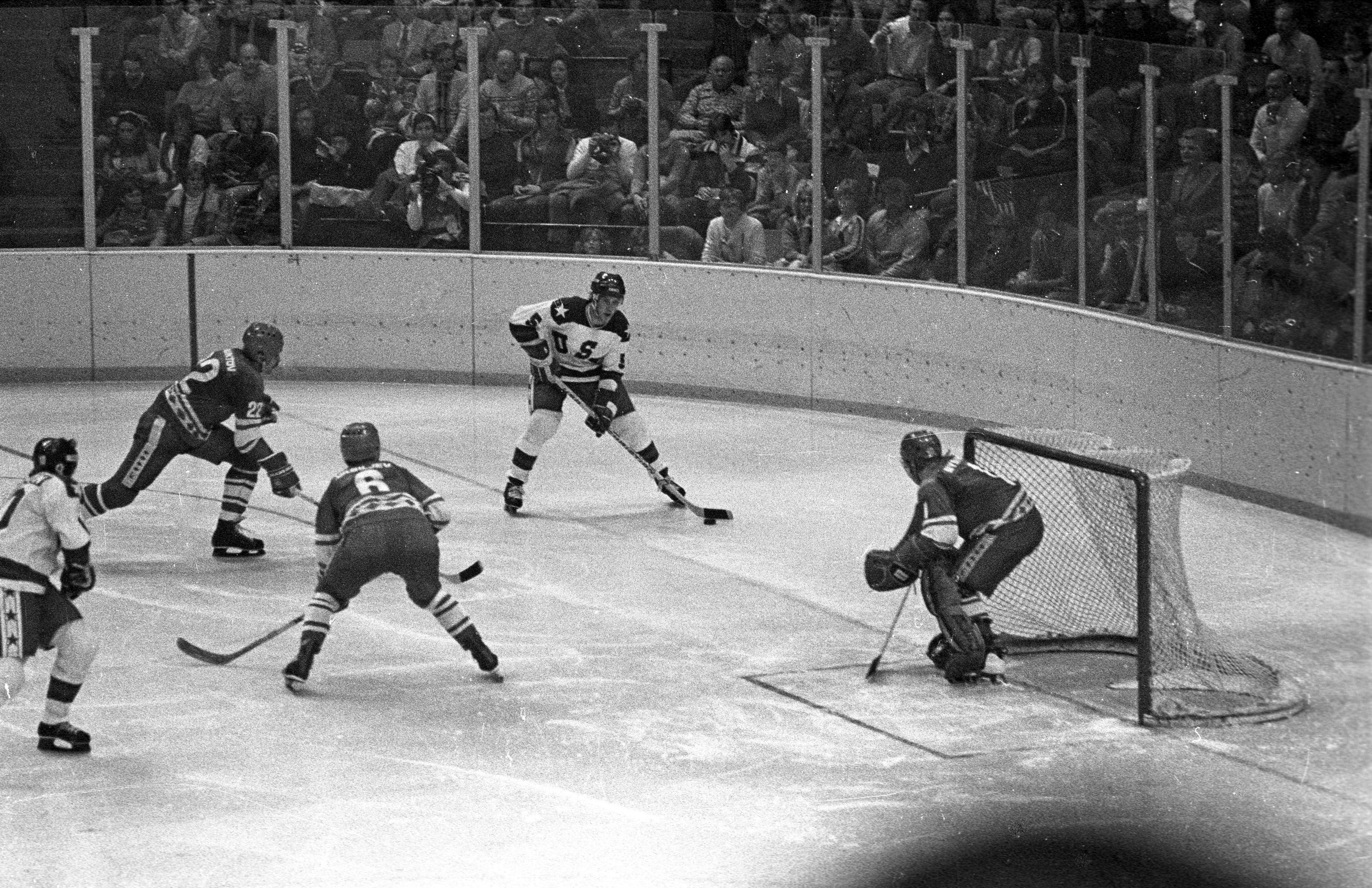
During the USA vs. Soviet Union match at the 1980 Winter Olympics which became known as the Miracle on Ice.

== See also ==
- Herb Brooks National Hockey Center

Winter Olympics
Sporting positions
Preceded by Broadmoor World Arena; Colorado Springs, Colorado	Host of the Men's Frozen Four; 1970	Succeeded by Onondaga War Memorial; Syracuse, New York
Preceded by Ralph Engelstad Arena; Grand Forks, North Dakota	Host of the Men's Frozen Four; 1984	Succeeded by Joe Louis Arena; Detroit, Michigan
Preceded by Joe Louis Arena; Detroit, Michigan	Host of the Men's Frozen Four; 1988	Succeeded by Saint Paul Civic Center; St. Paul, Minnesota
Preceded by Boston Garden; Boardwalk Hall; People's United Center	Host of the ECAC Hockey Championship Game; 1994–2002, 2014–2019, 2022–present	Succeeded by Times Union Center; People's United Center; Current
Preceded by Mariucci Arena; Minneapolis	Host of the Women's Frozen Four; 2007	Succeeded by DECC; Duluth, Minnesota
Preceded by Wessman Arena; Ridder Arena; Ridder Arena; Utica Memorial Auditorium; LECOM Harborcenter	Host of the Division III men's Frozen Four; 2008 / 2009 / 2010; 2012 / 2013; 2016; 2018; 2022	Succeeded by Ridder Arena; Androscoggin Bank Colisée; Utica Memorial Auditorium; K.B. Willett Arena; Raymond J. Bourque Arena
