= St. Norbert Green Knights =

- University: St. Norbert College
- Conference: NACC
- NCAA: Division III
- Athletic director: Cam Fuller
- Location: De Pere, Wisconsin
- Varsity teams: 23
- Football stadium: Schneider Stadium
- Basketball arena: Mulva Family Fitness and Sports Center
- Ice hockey arena: Cornerstone Community Ice Center
- Baseball stadium: Mel Nicks Sports Complex- Also known as "The Shrine"
- Nickname: Green Knights
- Colors: Green and Gold
- Website: athletics.snc.edu
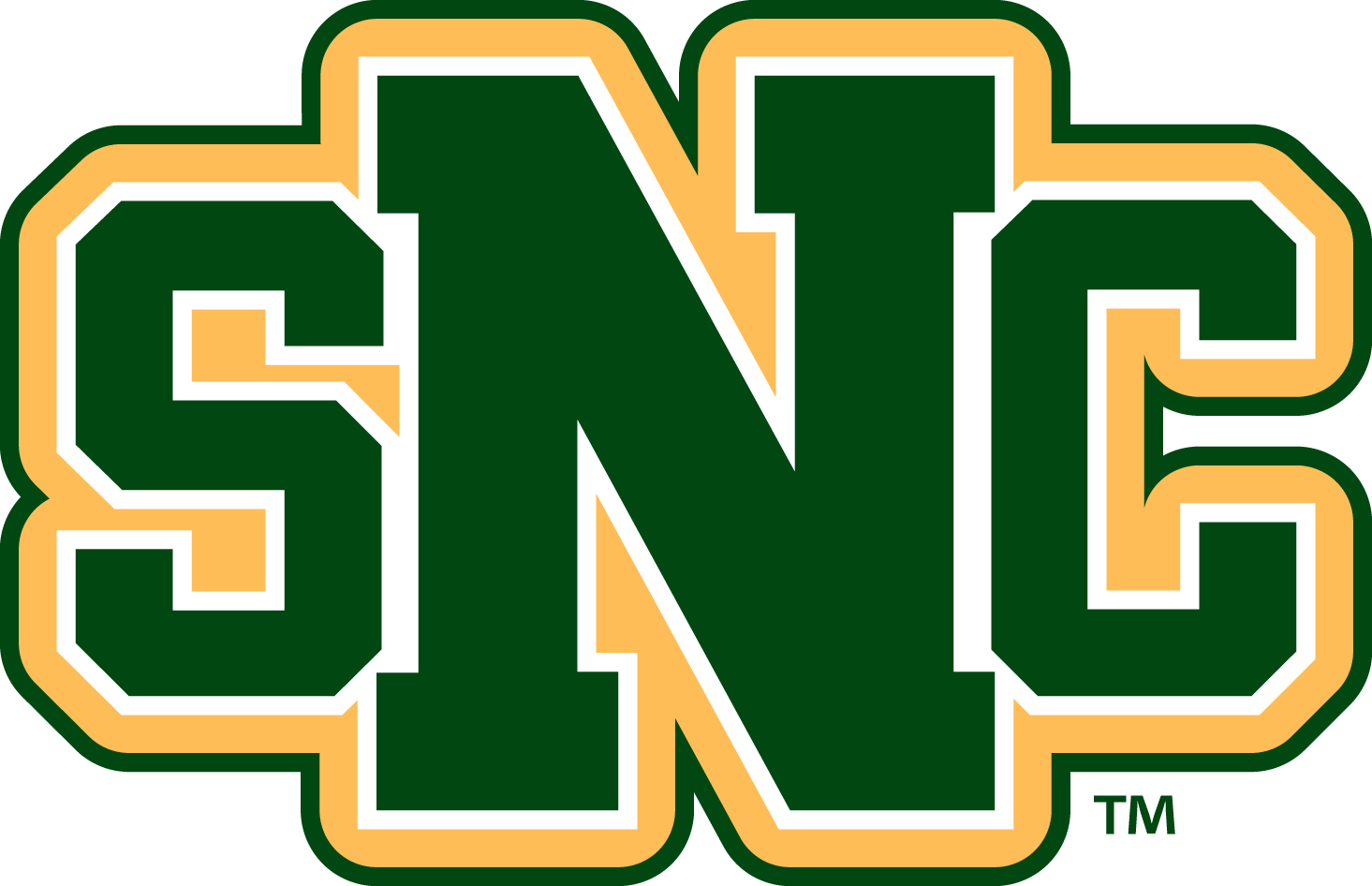

The St. Norbert Green Knights are teams representing St. Norbert College in 23 sports in NCAA Division III athletics. The Green Knights joined the Northern Athletics Collegiate Conference (NACC) in July 2020 after 38 years in the Midwest Conference (MWC). Prior to joining the NACC full-time, St. Norbert had been a member of that league in men's volleyball in the 2020 season (2019–20 school year), the school's first in that sport.

== Varsity teams ==
Men's sports	Women's sports
Baseball	Basketball
Basketball	Cross Country
Cross Country	Golf
Football	Ice Hockey
Golf	Soccer
Ice Hockey	Softball
Soccer	Swimming and diving
Swimming and diving	Tennis
Tennis	Track and field^{1}
Track and field^{1}	Volleyball
Volleyball	Volleyball
^{1} – includes both indoor and outdoor

=== Football ===
The Green Knights have been coached by Dan McCarty since 2015. He was the defensive coordinator until the previous Green Knights coach elected to resign from his position. McCarty previously coached the defense at the University of Wisconsin–Stout.

=== Ice hockey ===
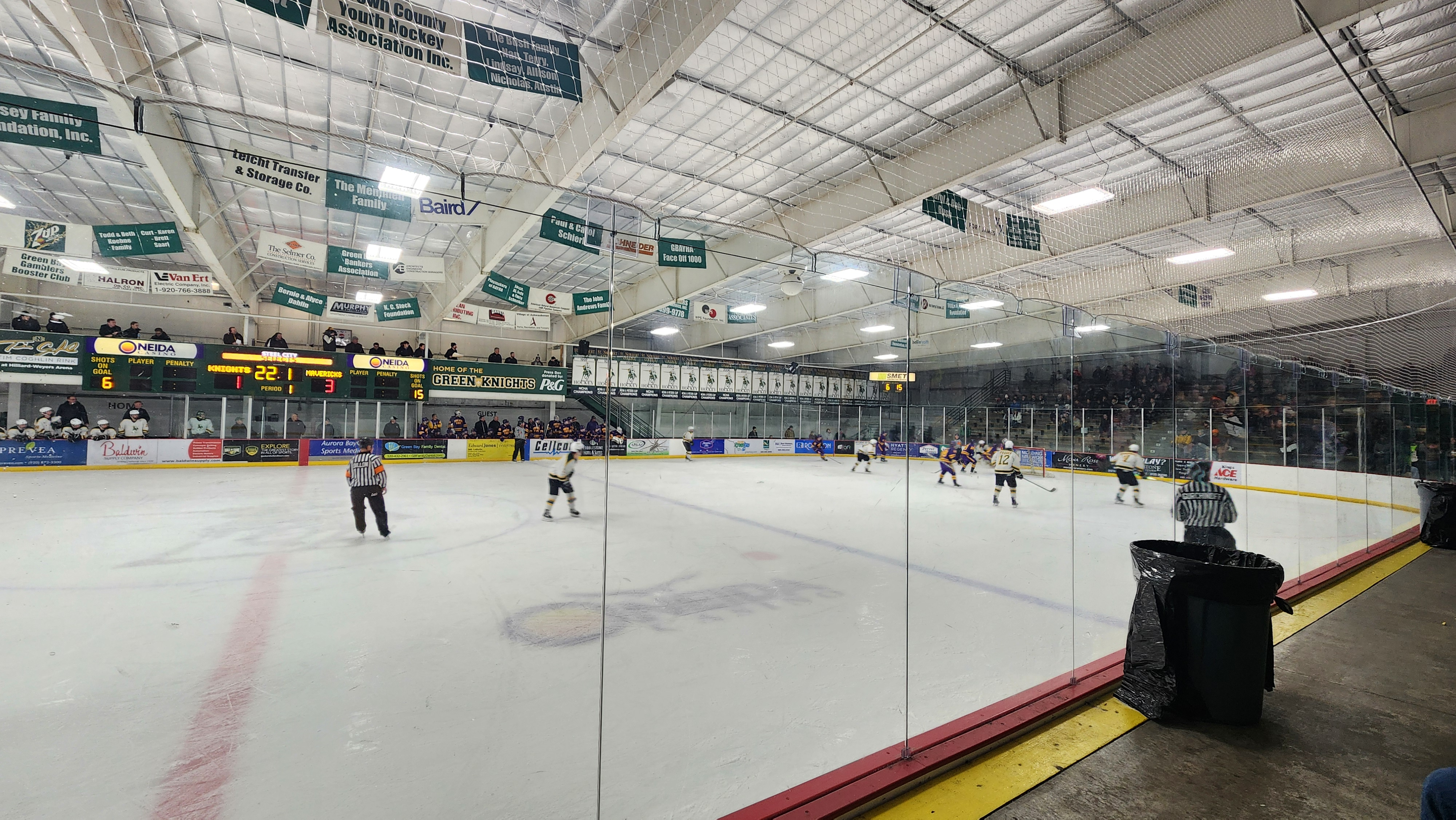
The St. Norbert Green Knights scrimmaging against the Division I Minnesota State Mavericks at SNC's home rink, the Cornerstone Community Center.

The St. Norbert men's hockey program is coached by Tim Coghlin. Under Coughlin the Green Knights have reached the Frozen Four 12 times, and has won five NCAA Division III national championships (2008, 2011, 2012, 2014, 2018) and finished as runners-up four times (2004, 2006, 2010, 2016).

Results in international competition:

- In 2006, Maris Ziedins represented Latvia at the Winter Olympics in Turin, Italy.
- In 2023, Brendan Mark and Michael

McChesney won silver medals with Team USA at the World University Games in Lake Placid, NY. SNC alum Mike Szkodzinski was an assistant coach for Team USA. Adam Stachowiak represented Slovakia.
