= Dan Stauber =

American ice hockey player

Biographical details
- Born: Duluth, Minnesota, U.S.
- Education: University of Wisconsin–Superior

Playing career
- 1984–1988: Wisconsin–Superior
- 1988–1989: Borås HC
- Position: Forward

Coaching career (HC unless noted)
- 1989–1992: Wisconsin–Eau Claire (asst.)
- 1992–?: Waupaca HS
- ?–1998: Denfeld HS
- 1998–2000: Wisconsin–Superior (asst.)
- 2000–2016: Wisconsin–Superior
- 2016–2020: Proctor HS

Head coaching record
- Overall: 258–148–58 (.619) [college]
- Tournaments: 8–3–1 (.708)

Accomplishments and honors

Championships
- 2001 NCHA champion 2001 NCHA tournament champion 2002 NCHA tournament champion 2002 National Champion; 2006 NCHA tournament champion 2009 NCHA champion

Awards
- 2002 Edward Jeremiah Award

Daniel Stauber is an American former ice hockey player and coach who was the NCAA Division III coach of the year.

== Career ==
Stauber's college career began in 1984 with Wisconsin–Superior. Unfortunately, during his four years as a player, the Yellowjackets never finished with a winning record. After graduating, Stauber briefly played professional hockey in Sweden, before retiring in 1989. He remained in the game, becoming an assistant coach at Wisconsin–Eau Claire shortly thereafter. In the mid-90's, he became the head coach at Waupaca High School and later his alma mater, Denfeld High School.

Stauber was lured back to Wisconsin–Superior in 1998 as an assistant coach. He served under his former coach, Steve Nelson, for two seasons before being named as his replacement in 2000. While Nelson had led Wisconsin–Superior to the frozen four in seven of the previous nine seasons, the team had been unable to win the championship. In Stauber's first season as head coach, that trend continued; while he led the program to its first ever 30-win season, UWS was defeated by the Plattsburgh State Cardinals in the national semifinal. A year later, however, Stauber finally got his team to reach the promised land when they downed the Norwich Cadets 3–2 in overtime to win their first NCAA national championship. Stauber was named as the national coach of the year for his efforts.

The team declined a bit after the championship, but Stauber continued to lead them to positive results for many years afterwards. The Yellowjackets made two more appearances in the NCAA tournament but, by the 2010s, they had fallen down in the standings. During his tenure as head coach, Stauber went back to class and earned a Master's in education. In 2015, UW-Superior announced the return of Men's Golf to their athletics program. Stauber coached their team during the inaugural season and led them to a second place finish in the Upper Midwest Athletics Conference. In 2016, Stauber stepped down as head coach a little more than a year after setting the program record for the most wins behind the bench. He returned to the high school ranks with Proctor High School, serving as the boys' ice hockey coach for four seasons before hanging up his whistle in 2020 and working as a teacher thereafter.

== Personal life ==
Stauber's three brothers all played college hockey. Jamie attended Wisconsin–Eau Claire in the early 80's, Pete won a Division I national championship at Lake Superior State and Robb won the Hobey Baker Award while attending Minnesota before embarking on a career in the NHL.

Towards the end of his tenure at Wisconsin–Superior, Dan coached his son Owen with the Yellowjackets. He also had several nephews play college hockey, including Jaxson, Levi and Willy.

== Career statistics ==
=== Regular season and playoffs ===
			Regular Season					Playoffs
Season	Team	League	GP	G	A	Pts	PIM	GP	G	A	Pts	PIM
1984–85	Wisconsin–Superior	NCHA	—	—	—	—	—	—	—	—	—	—
1985–86	Wisconsin–Superior	NCHA	—	—	—	—	—	—	—	—	—	—
1986–87	Wisconsin–Superior	NCHA	—	—	—	—	—	—	—	—	—	—
1987–88	Wisconsin–Superior	NCHA	—	—	—	—	—	—	—	—	—	—
1988–89	Borås HC	Division 2	6	3	5	8	—	—	—	—	—	—
NCAA totals			—	—	—	—	—	—	—	—	—	—

== Head coaching record ==
=== College ===
Record table
Season	Team	Overall	Conference	Standing	Postseason
Wisconsin–Superior Yellowjackets (NCHA) (2000–2013)
2000–01	Wisconsin–Superior	30–4–1	11–3–0	1st	NCAA third-place game (win)
2001–02	Wisconsin–Superior	24–5–5	8–3–3	2nd	NCAA national champion
2002–03	Wisconsin–Superior	21–6–2	11–2–1	T–2nd	NCHA runner-up
2003–04	Wisconsin–Superior	15–8–4	7–4–3	3rd	NCHA Quarterfinals
2004–05	Wisconsin–Superior	19–3–7	9–2–3	2nd	NCHA runner-up
2005–06	Wisconsin–Superior	18–10–3	7–5–2	3rd	NCAA Quarterfinals
2006–07	Wisconsin–Superior	20–6–1	9–4–1	4th	NCHA Quarterfinals
2007–08	Wisconsin–Superior	13–6–8	6–4–4	T–3rd	NCHA Quarterfinals
2008–09	Wisconsin–Superior	23–4–3	11–1–2	1st	NCAA Quarterfinals
2009–10	Wisconsin–Superior	9–11–7	3–11–4	7th	NCHA Quarterfinals
2010–11	Wisconsin–Superior	16–13–1	10–8–0	T–2nd	NCHA runner-up
2011–12	Wisconsin–Superior	10–10–7	4–7–7	5th	NCHA Quarterfinals
2012–13	Wisconsin–Superior	11–14–2	6–10–2	T–5th	NCHA Quarterfinals
Wisconsin–Superior:		229–100–51	102–64–32		
Wisconsin–Superior Yellowjackets (WIAC) (2013–2016)
2013–14	Wisconsin–Superior	11–15–3	3–7–2	T–4th	WIAC Runner-Up
2014–15	Wisconsin–Superior	9–18–1	1–11–0	5th	WIAC Semifinals
2015–16	Wisconsin–Superior	9–15–3	2–5–1	4th	WIAC first round
Wisconsin–Superior:		29–48–7	6–23–3		
Total:		258–148–58			
National champion Postseason invitational champion Conference regular season champion Conference regular season and conference tournament champion Division regular season champion Division regular season and conference tournament champion Conference tournament champion

Awards and achievements
Preceded by Wayne Wilson	Edward Jeremiah Award; 2001–02	Succeeded by George Roll
