= Irvine Park =

Irvine Park may refer to:

- Irvine Park (Orange, California), listed on the National Register of Historic Places (NRHP)
- Irvine Park Historic District, Saint Paul, Minnesota, also NRHP-listed
- Irvine Park (Chippewa Falls, Wisconsin)
