= 2020–21 NCAA Division III men's ice hockey season =

- Duration: October 30, 2020– April 5, 2021
- NCAA tournament: 2021
- NCAA champion: None
- Sid Watson Award: None (-)

The 2020–21 NCAA Division III men's ice hockey season began on October 30, 2020, and concluded on April 5, 2021. This was the 48th season of Division III college ice hockey.

As a result of the ongoing COVID-19 pandemic, approximately half of the existing Division III schools did not participate in the 2020–21 season. Because this occurred for all sports across the country, the NCAA decided to cancel all Division III national tournaments for winter sports for the season.

== Regular season ==
Due to the severe reduction in participants during the season, most conferences decided against holding tournaments. Only the NCHA, UCHC and WIAC named tournament champions.

=== Standings ===
2020–21 Commonwealth Coast Conference ice hockey standings
	Conference										Overall					
	GP	W	L	T	OTW	OTL	3/SW	PTS	GF	GA	GP	W	L	T	GF	GA
Becker	0	0	0	0	0	0	0	0	0	0	9	1	7	1	18	35
Curry	0	0	0	0	0	0	0	0	0	0	5	3	2	0	14	14
Endicott	0	0	0	0	0	0	0	0	0	0	3	3	0	0	17	4
University of New England	0	0	0	0	0	0	0	0	0	0	4	4	0	0	23	11
Nichols	0	0	0	0	0	0	0	0	0	0	4	2	2	0	14	17
Salve Regina	0	0	0	0	0	0	0	0	0	0	0	0	0	0	0	0
Suffolk	0	0	0	0	0	0	0	0	0	0	2	1	1	0	7	7
Wentworth	0	0	0	0	0	0	0	0	0	0	0	0	0	0	0	0
Western New England	0	0	0	0	0	0	0	0	0	0	0	0	0	0	0	0
Championship: Cancelled † indicates conference regular season champion * indicates conference tournament champions

2020–21 NCAA Division III Independent ice hockey standings
	Overall record					
	GP	W	L	T	GF	GA
Albertus Magnus	2	0	2	0	4	12
Anna Maria	6	1	5	0	11	21
Bryn Athyn	0	0	0	0	0	0
Canton State	0	0	0	0	0	0

2020–21 Massachusetts State Collegiate Athletic Conference ice hockey standings
	Conference							Overall					
	GP	W	L	T	PTS	GF	GA	GP	W	L	T	GF	GA
Fitchburg State	0	0	0	0	0	0	0	0	0	0	0	0	0
Framingham State	0	0	0	0	0	0	0	0	0	0	0	0	0
Massachusetts–Dartmouth	0	0	0	0	0	0	0	3	3	0	0	14	6
Plymouth State	0	0	0	0	0	0	0	8	4	4	0	23	20
Salem State	0	0	0	0	0	0	0	0	0	0	0	0	0
Westfield State	0	0	0	0	0	0	0	0	0	0	0	0	0
Worcester State	0	0	0	0	0	0	0	0	0	0	0	0	0
Championship: Cancelled † indicates conference regular season champion * indicates conference tournament champions

2020–21 Minnesota Intercollegiate Athletic Conference ice hockey standings
	Conference								Overall					
	GP	W	L	T	PTS	PT%	GF	GA	GP	W	L	T	GF	GA
Saint John's	5	4	0	1	9	.900	22	10	10	6	2	2	35	26
St. Thomas	3	2	0	1	5	.833	11	5	9	6	1	2	34	20
Saint Mary's	5	3	2	0	6	.600	18	19	11	5	6	0	38	46
Augsburg	2	1	1	0	2	.500	6	4	5	4	1	0	24	8
Concordia (MN)	2	1	1	0	2	.500	4	5	2	1	1	0	4	5
Hamline	3	1	2	0	2	.333	5	9	6	2	4	0	12	21
Bethel	4	0	4	0	0	.000	10	22	6	2	4	0	26	37
Gustavus Adolphus	2	0	2	0	0	.000	6	8	8	2	6	0	11	22
St. Olaf	0	0	0	0	0	-	0	0	2	1	1	0	5	5
Championship: Cancelled † indicates conference regular season champion * indicates conference tournament champion

2020–21 New England Hockey Conference standings
	Conference							Overall					
	GP	W	L	T	PTS	GF	GA	GP	W	L	T	GF	GA
Babson	0	0	0	0	0	0	0	8	8	0	0	40	12
Castleton	0	0	0	0	0	0	0	7	0	7	0	9	38
Hobart	0	0	0	0	0	0	0	0	0	0	0	0	0
Johnson & Wales	0	0	0	0	0	0	0	0	0	0	0	0	0
Massachusetts–Boston	0	0	0	0	0	0	0	0	0	0	0	0	0
New England College	0	0	0	0	0	0	0	10	3	7	0	25	36
Norwich	0	0	0	0	0	0	0	8	7	1	0	24	6
Skidmore	0	0	0	0	0	0	0	0	0	0	0	0	0
Southern Maine	0	0	0	0	0	0	0	4	2	2	0	7	11
Championship: Cancelled † indicates conference regular season champion * indicates conference tournament champion

2020–21 New England Small College Athletic Conference ice hockey standings
	Conference							Overall					
	GP	W	L	T	PTS	GF	GA	GP	W	L	T	GF	GA
Amherst	0	0	0	0	0	0	0	0	0	0	0	0	0
Bowdoin	0	0	0	0	0	0	0	0	0	0	0	0	0
Colby	0	0	0	0	0	0	0	4	1	3	0	9	11
Connecticut College	0	0	0	0	0	0	0	5	4	0	1	25	10
Hamilton	0	0	0	0	0	0	0	0	0	0	0	0	0
Middlebury	0	0	0	0	0	0	0	0	0	0	0	0	0
Trinity	0	0	0	0	0	0	0	0	0	0	0	0	0
Tufts	0	0	0	0	0	0	0	0	0	0	0	0	0
Wesleyan	0	0	0	0	0	0	0	0	0	0	0	0	0
Williams	0	0	0	0	0	0	0	0	0	0	0	0	0
Championship: Cancelled † indicates conference regular season champion * indicates conference tournament champion

2020–21 Northern Collegiate Hockey Association standings
	Conference										Overall					
	GP	W	L	T	OTW	OTL	3/SW	PTS	GF	GA	GP	W	L	T	GF	GA
North
Concordia (WI)	8	6	2	0	1	1	0	18	29	19	21	9	12	0	69	77
Marian *	8	5	3	0	0	0	0	15	27	20	19	12	7	0	63	54
Lawrence	8	4	4	0	0	1	0	13	32	27	9	4	5	0	33	30
St. Scholastica	8	4	4	0	1	1	0	12	36	28	15	7	8	0	62	57
Finlandia	8	1	7	0	1	0	0	2	16	46	8	1	7	0	16	46
St. Norbert	0	0	0	0	0	0	0	0	0	0	0	0	0	0	0	0
South
Adrian †	8	8	0	0	0	0	0	24	46	10	23	16	6	1	100	53
Aurora	8	4	4	0	1	1	0	12	23	24	11	5	6	0	36	34
MSOE	8	3	4	1	1	2	1	12	21	21	19	10	7	2	52	47
Trine	8	3	4	1	1	0	0	9	15	34	14	3	10	1	31	68
Lake Forest	8	1	7	0	0	0	0	3	7	23	8	1	7	0	7	23
Championship: March 19–20, 2021 † indicates conference regular season champion * indicates conference tournament champion

2020–21 State University of New York Athletic Conference ice hockey standings
	Conference							Overall					
	GP	W	L	T	PTS	GF	GA	GP	W	L	T	GF	GA
Brockport State	0	0	0	0	0	0	0	0	0	0	0	0	0
Buffalo State	0	0	0	0	0	0	0	0	0	0	0	0	0
Cortland State	0	0	0	0	0	0	0	0	0	0	0	0	0
Fredonia State	0	0	0	0	0	0	0	0	0	0	0	0	0
Geneseo State	0	0	0	0	0	0	0	0	0	0	0	0	0
Morrisville State	0	0	0	0	0	0	0	0	0	0	0	0	0
Oswego State	0	0	0	0	0	0	0	0	0	0	0	0	0
Plattsburgh State	0	0	0	0	0	0	0	0	0	0	0	0	0
Potsdam State	0	0	0	0	0	0	0	0	0	0	0	0	0
Championship: Cancelled † indicates conference regular season champion * indicates conference tournament champions

2020–21 United Collegiate Hockey Conference standings
	Conference record											Overall record					
	GP	W	L	T	OW	OL	SW	PTS	PT%	GF	GA	GP	W	L	T	GF	GA
Utica †	8	7	1	0	0	0	0	21	.875	49	16	10	8	2	0	59	18
Stevenson	9	7	1	1	0	0	1	23	.852	42	21	16	12	3	1	60	33
Wilkes	9	6	3	0	1	1	0	18	.667	38	31	11	7	4	0	42	37
Elmira *	10	6	3	1	1	0	1	19	.633	42	32	15	10	4	1	57	36
Chatham	10	5	5	0	0	1	0	16	.533	27	30	13	5	8	0	29	44
Lebanon Valley	7	2	3	2	0	0	1	9	.429	14	21	7	2	3	2	14	21
Neumann	8	1	5	2	0	0	0	5	.208	14	28	9	1	6	2	16	31
Nazareth	10	0	10	0	0	0	0	0	.000	17	58	11	0	11	0	19	61
Manhattanville	3	0	3	0	0	0	0	0	.000	7	13	4	0	4	0	7	22
King's	0	0	0	0	0	0	0	0	-	0	0	0	0	0	0	0	0
Championship: April 5, 2021 † indicates conference regular season champion * indicates conference tournament champions

2020–21 Wisconsin Intercollegiate Athletic Conference ice hockey standings
	Conference								Overall					
	GP	W	L	T	OTW	PTS	GF	GA	GP	W	L	T	GF	GA
Wisconsin–River Falls †	10	6	3	1	0	13	26	17	10	6	3	1	26	17
Wisconsin–Eau Claire	8	5	2	1	0	11	29	13	9	5	3	1	29	15
Wisconsin–Stevens Point	9	5	3	1	0	11	28	27	12	7	4	1	38	34
Wisconsin–Superior *	8	5	3	0	0	10	30	22	10	7	3	0	35	25
Wisconsin–Stout	10	4	6	0	0	8	26	38	11	4	7	0	27	40
Northland	9	0	8	1	0	1	11	33	10	0	9	1	14	38
Championship: March 12, 2021 † indicates conference regular season champion * indicates conference tournament champion

Note: Mini-game are not included in final standings

== 2021 NCAA Tournament ==
Cancelled

== See also ==
- 2020–21 NCAA Division I men's ice hockey season
- 2020–21 NCAA Division II men's ice hockey season
