= 2002 NCAA Division III men's ice hockey tournament =

- Teams: 9
- Finals site: Kenyon Arena, Middlebury, Vermont
- Champions: Wisconsin–Superior Yellowjackets (1st title)
- Runner-up: Norwich Cadets (2nd title game)
- Semifinalists: Middlebury Panthers (6th Frozen Four); Plattsburgh State Cardinals (8th Frozen Four)
- Winning coach: Dan Stauber (1st title)
- Attendance: 19,202

The 2002 NCAA Division III Men's Ice Hockey Tournament was the culmination of the 2001–02 season, the 19th such tournament in NCAA history. It concluded with Wisconsin-Superior defeating Norwich in the championship game 3-2 in overtime. All First Round and Quarterfinal matchups were held at home team venues, while all succeeding games were played in Middlebury, Vermont.

== Qualifying teams ==
The following teams qualified for the tournament. Automatic bids were offered to the conference tournament champion of seven different conferences with one at-large bid for the best remaining team from each region.

East							West						
Seed	School	Conference	Record	Berth Type	Appearance	Last Bid	Seed	School	Conference	Record	Berth Type	Appearance	Last Bid
1	Middlebury (1)	NESCAC	24–1–1	Tournament Champion	8th	2001	1	St. Norbert (3)	NCHA	23–4–2	At-Large	4th	1999
2	RIT (2)	ECAC West	23–2–0	Tournament Champion	12th	2001	2	Wisconsin–Superior	NCHA	20–5–4	Tournament Champion	10th	2001
3	Norwich (4)	ECAC East	24–4–0	Tournament Champion	5th	2000	3	St. Thomas	MIAC	22–5–0	Tournament Champion	10th	2000
4	Bowdoin	ECAC East	18–4–3	At-Large	2nd	1996							
5	Plattsburgh State	SUNYAC	20–8–2	Tournament Champion	11th	2001							
6	Wentworth	ECAC Northeast	18–7–2	Tournament Champion	2nd	2000							

== Format ==
The tournament featured four rounds of play. In the Quarterfinals, teams played a two-game series where the first team to reach 3 points was declared a winner (2 points for winning a game, 1 point each for tying). If both teams ended up with 2 points after the first two games a 20-minute mini-game was played to determine a winner. Mini-game scores are in italics. All other rounds were Single-game elimination. For the three eastern Quarterfinals, the teams were seeded according to their rankings with the top three teams serving as hosts. For the western quarterfinal, the top-ranked team awaited the winner of a play-in game between the lower-ranked teams. The quarterfinal brackets were arranged so that were all higher-seeded teams to advance, the first overall seed would play the fourth overall seed in the semifinals.

The third place game ceased to be held with this tournament.

== Tournament bracket ==
First Round
W2	Wisconsin–Superior	2
W3	St. Thomas	1

Quarterfinals
W1	St. Norbert (3)	4*	2	-
W2	Wisconsin–Superior	4	4	-
E2	RIT (2)	4*	2*	0
E5	Plattsburgh State	4	2	1
E1	Middlebury (1)	6	9	-
E6	Wentworth	0	1	-
E3	Norwich (4)	3	7	-
E4	Bowdoin	0	0	-

Semifinals
W2	Wisconsin–Superior	5
E5	Plattsburgh State	0
E1	Middlebury (1)	2
E3	Norwich (4)	5

National Championship
W2	Wisconsin–Superior	3*
E3	Norwich (4)	2

Note: * denotes overtime period(s)
Note: Mini-games in italics

== First round ==
=== (W2) Wisconsin–Superior vs. (W3) St. Thomas ===
March	Wisconsin–Superior	2 – 1	St. Thomas	Wessman Arena
06:18 – pp – Dale Lupul (4)		First period	Eric Wenkus (15) – 00:44
12:45 – Reed Larson (8)		Second period	No scoring
No scoring		Third period	No scoring
Nathan Ziemski (23 saves / 24 shots)		Goalie stats	Bob Tallarico (37 saves / 39 shots)

== Quarterfinals ==
=== (W1) St. Norbert vs. (W2) Wisconsin–Superior ===
March 9	St. Norbert	4 – 4	OT	Wisconsin–Superior	Cornerstone Community Center
No scoring		First period		Milan Tomaska (3) – 3:18
5:27 – Jim Underwood (7); 9:40 – Andy Trann (17)		Second period		Josh Liebenow (12) – pp – 11:39; Josh Liebenow (13) – pp – 13:46
3:18 – Jason Deitsch (13); 16:59 – Faron Duthie (17)		Third period		Colin Kendall (16) – 17:44
No scoring		Overtime		No scoring
Ryan Gill (30 saves / 34 shots)		Goalie stats		Nathan Ziemski (37 saves / 41 shots)

March 10	St. Norbert	2 – 4	Wisconsin–Superior	Cornerstone Community Center
No scoring		First period	Kyle Nosan (10) – 13:14
No scoring		Second period	Randy Currie (4) – 4:30; Reed Larson (9) – 12:56; Josh Liebenow (14) – 19:46
4:59 – Ryan Tew (2); 6:49 – Māris Ziediņš (21)		Third period	No scoring
Ryan Gill (24 saves / 26 shots); Chancy Colquhoun (11 saves / 13 shots)		Goalie stats	Nathan Ziemski (27 saves / 29 shots)

Wisconsin–Superior won series on total points 3–1

==== (E2) RIT vs. (E5) Plattsburgh State ====
March 8	RIT	4 – 4	OT	Plattsburgh State	Frank Ritter Memorial Ice Arena
No scoring		First period		Peter Ollari (9) – 1:21; Brendon Hodge (9) – sh – 14:58
6:23 – Brian Armes (7); 14:27 – Jason Chafe (11); 17:06 – pp – Shawn Wilkins (5)		Second period		James Coleman (3) – 10:57
17:04 – David Bagley (18)		Third period		Adam Richards (12) – pp – 11:26
No scoring		Overtime		No scoring
Tyler Euverman (24 saves / 28 shots)		Goalie stats		Niklas Sundberg (42 saves / 46 shots)

March 9	RIT	2 – 2	OT	Plattsburgh State	Frank Ritter Memorial Ice Arena
5:16 – Shawn Wilkins (6)		First period		Brendon Hodge (10) – 18:52
No scoring		Second period		No scoring
11:39 – Sam Hill (12)		Third period		Jeff Marshall (5) – 17:22
No scoring		Overtime		No scoring
Tyler Euverman (27 saves / 29 shots)		Goalie stats		Niklas Sundberg (29 saves / 31 shots)

March 9 (mini game)	RIT	0 – 1	Plattsburgh State	Frank Ritter Memorial Ice Arena

Plattsburgh State won series on total points 3–2

==== (E1) Middlebury vs. (E6) Wentworth ====
March 8	Middlebury	6 – 0	Wentworth	Kenyon Arena
No scoring		First period	No scoring
10:33 – Kevin Cooper (27); 15:09 – Jack Kennedy (1); 18:30 – John Dawson (13)		Second period	No scoring
10:07 – John Dawson (14); 17:28 – Adam Foote (13); 18:06 – Andy Campbell (8)		Third period	No scoring
Christian Carlsson (10 saves / 10 shots)		Goalie stats	Raj Bhangoo (49 saves / 55 shots)

March 9	Middlebury	9 – 1	Wentworth	Kenyon Arena
4:02 – Robert Chisholm (9)		First period	No scoring
1:20 – Patrick Nugent (3); 8:12 – J.F. Duchesne (6); 17:46 – pp – Ryan Constantine (7)		Second period	No scoring
0:26 – Matt Dunn (13); 2:01 – Mike Kennedy (4); 13:29 – Mike Kennedy (5); 13:56 – Mike Kennedy (6); 15:21 – Kevin Cooper (28)		Third period	Ben Pierce (7) – pp – 8:59
Christian Carlsson (9 saves / 10 shots)		Goalie stats	Jamie Vanek (38 saves / 47 shots); Bryce McFadden (2 saves / 2 shots)

Middlebury won series on total points 4–0

==== (E3) Norwich vs. (E4) Bowdoin ====
March 8	Norwich	3 – 0	Bowdoin	Kreitzberg Arena
11:17 – Vadim Beliaev (12)		First period	No scoring
No scoring		Second period	No scoring
13:53 – Phil Aucoin (15); 19:59 – en – Keith Maurice (6)		Third period	No scoring
Kevin Schieve (22 saves / 22 shots)		Goalie stats	Mike Healey (27 saves / 29 shots)

March 9	Norwich	7 – 0	Bowdoin	Kreitzberg Arena
3:59 – Vadim Beliaev (13); 13:42 – Vadim Beliaev (14); 15:50 – Matt Schmidt (21); 19:47 – Ed Boudreau (12)		First period	No scoring
18:40 – Timmy Kyrkostas (6)		Second period	No scoring
0:49 – Phil Aucoin (16); 14:35 – Peter Catalano (8)		Third period	No scoring
Kevin Schieve (24 saves / 24 shots); Ziga Ivanic (3 saves / 3 shots)		Goalie stats	Mike Healey (22 saves / 28 shots); Pascal Chiasson (3 saves / 4 shots)

Norwich won series on total points 4–0

== Semifinals ==
=== (W2) Wisconsin–Superior vs. (E5) Plattsburgh State ===
March 15	Wisconsin–Superior	5 – 0	Plattsburgh State	Kenyon Arena
13:36 – Rob Whidden (9); 16:09 – Yann Poirier (20)		First period	No scoring
6:24 – Reed Larson (10); 19:18 – Ryan Kalbrener (12)		Second period	No scoring
0:48 – pp – Dale Lupul (5)		Third period	No scoring
Nathan Ziemski (16 saves / 16 shots)		Goalie stats	Niklas Sundberg (18 saves / 23 shots); Tony Seariac (0 saves / 0 shots)

=== (E1) Middlebury vs. (E3) Norwich ===
March 15	Middlebury	2 – 5	Norwich	Wessman Arena
No scoring		First period	Ed Boudreau (13) – 0:31; Phil Aucoin (17) – pp – 8:07
No scoring		Second period	Matt Schmidt (22) – pp – 8:37; Ed Boudreau (14) – pp – 13:34
0:13 – Robert Chisholm (10); 10:41 – Andrew Helming (6)		Third period	Mario Chinelli (7) – en – 19:42
Christian Carlsson (15 saves / 19 shots)		Goalie stats	Kevin Schieve (18 saves / 20 shots)

== National Championship ==
=== (W2) Wisconsin–Superior vs. (E3) Norwich ===
March 16	Wisconsin–Superior	3 – 2	OT	Norwich	Kenyon Arena
14:25 – Randy Currie (5)		First period		Kurtis McLean (28) – pp – 13:38
No scoring		Second period		Matt Schmidt (23) – 5:31
18:34 – Colin Kendall (17)		Third period		No scoring
0:23 – Colin Kendall (18)		First overtime period		No scoring
Nathan Ziemski (26 saves / 28 shots)		Goalie stats		Kevin Schieve (16 saves / 19 shots)

== Record by conference ==
Conference	# of Bids	Record	Win %	Frozen Four	Championship Game	Champions
NCHA	2	4–1–2	.714	1	1	1
ECAC East	2	3–3–0	.500	1	1	-
NESCAC	1	2–1–0	.667	1	-	-
ECAC West	1	0–0–2	.500	-	-	-
SUNYAC	1	0–1–2	.333	1	-	-
ECAC Northeast	1	0–2–0	.000	-	-	-
MIAC	1	0–1–0	.000	-	-	-
