= WIAC men's ice hockey tournament =

Annual ice hockey tournament

Wisconsin Intercollegiate Athletic Conference men's ice hockey tournament
- Conference hockey championship
- Sport: Ice hockey
- Conference: WIAC
- Format: Modified Best of Three, Single-elimination
- Played: 2014–Present

The Wisconsin Intercollegiate Athletic Conference men's ice hockey tournament is the annual conference ice hockey championship tournament for the NCAA Division III Wisconsin Intercollegiate Athletic Conference. The tournament has been held annually since 2014.

== History ==
While the WIAC has existed since the 1910s, the number conference members that supported ice hockey programs had never reached the minimum required to receive an NCAA Tournament automatic bid (seven). Despite this hurdle, the conference elected to form an ice hockey division for the 2013–14 season, to become an all-sports conference. The WIAC tournament began the same season as the conference and includes all members schools.

== 2014 ==
Seed	School	Conference record
1	Wisconsin–River Falls	8–4–0
2	Wisconsin–Stevens Point	7–4–1
3	Wisconsin–Eau Claire	6–5–1
4	Wisconsin–Superior	3–7–2
5	Wisconsin–Stout	4–8–0

First Round; February 25
4	Wisconsin–Superior	6
5	Wisconsin–Stout	3

Semifinals; February 28–March 1
1	Wisconsin–River Falls	1	0	-
4	Wisconsin–Superior	2	4	-
2	Wisconsin–Stevens Point	4	0	1
3	Wisconsin–Eau Claire	2	1	2

Championship; March 8
4	Wisconsin–Superior	0
3	Wisconsin–Eau Claire	3

Note: * denotes overtime period(s)
Note: Mini-games in italics

== 2015 ==
Seed	School	Conference record
1	Wisconsin–Stevens Point	10–2–0
2	Wisconsin–Eau Claire	9–3–0
3	Wisconsin–River Falls	7–5–0
4	Wisconsin–Stout	3–9–0
5	Wisconsin–Superior	1–11–0

First Round; February 24
4	Wisconsin–Stout	3
5	Wisconsin–Superior	4*

Semifinals; February 27–28
1	Wisconsin–Stevens Point	1*	5	-
5	Wisconsin–Superior	1	3	-
2	Wisconsin–Eau Claire	3	4	1
3	Wisconsin–River Falls	4	2	2*

Championship; March 7
1	Wisconsin–Stevens Point	1
3	Wisconsin–River Falls	3

Note: * denotes overtime period(s)
Note: Mini-games in italics

== 2016 ==
Seed	School	Conference record
1	Wisconsin–River Falls	5–2–1
2	Wisconsin–Eau Claire	5–2–1
3	Wisconsin–Stevens Point	5–3–0
4	Wisconsin–Superior	2–5–1
5	Wisconsin–Stout	1–6–1

First Round; February 19–20
4	Wisconsin–Superior	2	5	2
5	Wisconsin–Stout	3	3	3

Semifinals; February 26–27
1	Wisconsin–River Falls	3	1*	-
5	Wisconsin–Stout	1	1	-
2	Wisconsin–Eau Claire	2*	1	-
3	Wisconsin–Stevens Point	2	2	-

Championship; March 5
1	Wisconsin–River Falls	3
3	Wisconsin–Stevens Point	4**

Note: * denotes overtime period(s)
Note: Mini-games in italics

=== Quarterfinals ===
==== (4) Wisconsin–Superior vs. (5) Wisconsin–Stevens Point ====
February 19	Wisconsin–Superior	2 – 3	Wisconsin–Stout	Wessman Arena
No scoring		First period	Justin Moody (9) – pp – 16:57
12:15 – Eric Shand (8); 17:16 – Ian Ecklund (10)		Second period	No scoring
No scoring		Third period	Gavin Smith (3) – 11:55; Jake Useldinger (9) – 16:54
Cory Simons (27 saves / 30 shots)		Goalie stats	Nick Schmit (28 saves / 30 shots)

February 20	Wisconsin–Superior	5 – 3	Wisconsin–Stout	Wessman Arena
No scoring		First period	Jake Useldinger (10) – 13:26
07:27 – pp – Daniel Kovar (2); 13:54 – Jordan Neduzak (11)		Second period	Dylan Zins (3) – 11:21; Joe Kleven (6) – 18:41
01:13 – James Hughes (4); 08:45 – Daniel Litchke (8); 19:53 – en – Jordan Neduzak (12)		Third period	No scoring
Bryce Fink (24 saves / 27 shots)		Goalie stats	Nick Schmit (38 saves / 42 shots)

February 20 (mini game)	Wisconsin–Superior	2 – 3	Wisconsin–Stout	Wessman Arena

Wisconsin–Stout won series on total points 4–2

=== Semifinals ===
==== (1) Wisconsin–River Falls vs. (5) Wisconsin–Stout ====
February 26	Wisconsin–River Falls	3 – 1	Wisconsin–Stout	Hunt Arena
No scoring		First period	Danny Ray (4) – 05:39
17:02 – Ryan Doner (6); 18:20 – Eddie Matsushima (6)		Second period	No scoring
06:24 – Zach Schrotenboer (9)		Third period	No scoring
Tanner Milliron (21 saves / 22 shots)		Goalie stats	Nick Schmit (37 saves / 40 shots)

February 27	Wisconsin–River Falls	1 – 1	OT	Wisconsin–Stout	Hunt Arena
No scoring		First period		No scoring
No scoring		Second period		Gavin Smith (4) - 12:47
07:24 – Cory Lushanko (3)		Third period		No scoring
No scoring		Overtime		No scoring
Tanner Milliron (28 saves / 29 shots)		Goalie stats		Nick Schmit (26 saves / 27 shots)

Wisconsin–River Falls won series on total points 3–1

==== (2) Wisconsin–Eau Claire vs. (3) Wisconsin–Stevens Point ====
February 26	Wisconsin–Eau Claire	2 – 2	OT	Wisconsin–Stevens Point	Hobbs Municipal Ice Center
No scoring		First period		Jacob Barber (7) – 04:12; Alex Kromm (6) – 15:17
11:39 – Jake Hopfner (9)		Second period		No scoring
03:52 – Lucas Kohls (2)		Third period		No scoring
No scoring		Overtime		No scoring
Jay Deo (26 saves / 28 shots)		Goalie stats		Max Milosek (32 saves / 34 shots)

February 27	Wisconsin–Eau Claire	1 – 2	Wisconsin–Stevens Point	Hobbs Municipal Ice Center
No scoring		First period	Jacob Barber (8) – 05:40; Jonathan Davis (15) – 07:24
02:10 – pp – Adam Knochenmus (22)		Second period	No scoring
No scoring		Third period	No scoring
Tyler Green (32 saves / 34 shots)		Goalie stats	Max Milosek (28 saves / 29 shots)

Wisconsin–Stevens Point won series on total points 3–1

=== Finals ===
==== (1) Wisconsin–River Falls vs. (3) Wisconsin–Stevens Point ====
February 26	Wisconsin–River Falls	3 – 4	2OT	Wisconsin–Stevens Point	Hunt Arena
No scoring		First period		Alex Brooks (6) – 08:11
No scoring		Second period		Drew Graves (2) – 06:13
07:45 – Christian George (8); 09:27 – Zach Schrotenboer (10); 10:17 – Danny Hamburg (4)		Third period		Kyle Sharkey (17) – 03:12
No scoring		Second overtime period		Lawrence Cornellier (20) – 02:35
Tanner Milliron (41 saves / 45 shots)		Goalie stats		Max Milosek (24 saves / 27 shots)

== 2017 ==
Seed	School	Conference record
1	Wisconsin–Stevens Point	7–1–0
2	Wisconsin–Eau Claire	5–3–0
3	Wisconsin–River Falls	3–4–1
4	Wisconsin–Stout	3–5–0
5	Wisconsin–Superior	1–6–1

First Round; February 18–19
4	Wisconsin–Stout	4	2	0
5	Wisconsin–Superior	3	4	1

Semifinals; February 25–26
1	Wisconsin–Stevens Point	5	8	-
5	Wisconsin–Superior	1	1	-
2	Wisconsin–Eau Claire	3	6	-
3	Wisconsin–River Falls	1	3	-

Championship; March 4
1	Wisconsin–Stevens Point	3
2	Wisconsin–Eau Claire	2

Note: * denotes overtime period(s)
Note: Mini-games in italics

== 2018 ==
Seed	School	Conference record
1	Wisconsin–Stevens Point	6–0–2
2	Wisconsin–Eau Claire	5–2–1
3	Wisconsin–Stout	3–4–1
4	Wisconsin–Superior	2–5–1
5	Wisconsin–River Falls	1–6–1

First Round; February 16–17
4	Wisconsin–Superior	1	3*	-
5	Wisconsin–River Falls	7	3	-

Semifinals; February 23–24
1	Wisconsin–Stevens Point	5	3	-
5	Wisconsin–River Falls	1	2	-
2	Wisconsin–Eau Claire	4	2	1
3	Wisconsin–Stout	1	3	0

Championship; March 3
1	Wisconsin–Stevens Point	2
2	Wisconsin–Eau Claire	3

Note: * denotes overtime period(s)
Note: Mini-games in italics

== 2019 ==
Seed	School	Conference record
1	Wisconsin–Stevens Point	8–0–0
2	Wisconsin–Eau Claire	4–3–1
3	Wisconsin–Superior	3–3–2
4	Wisconsin–River Falls	1–4–3
5	Wisconsin–Stout	0–6–2

First Round; February 15–16
4	Wisconsin–River Falls	3	3	-
5	Wisconsin–Stout	2	0	-

Semifinals; February 22–23
1	Wisconsin–Stevens Point	6	6	-
5	Wisconsin–River Falls	0	2	-
2	Wisconsin–Eau Claire	0	3*	2
3	Wisconsin–Superior	2	2	0

Championship; March 2
1	Wisconsin–Stevens Point	3
2	Wisconsin–Eau Claire	2

Note: * denotes overtime period(s)
Note: Mini-games in italics

== 2020 ==
Seed	School	Conference record	Seed	School	Conference record
1	Wisconsin–Stevens Point	10–2–3–1	4	Wisconsin–River Falls	7–6–2–0
2	Wisconsin–Eau Claire	11–3–1–2	5	Wisconsin–Stout	6–9–0–1
3	Wisconsin–Superior	7–8–0–2	6	Northland	1–14–0–0

First Round; February 21–22
3	Wisconsin–Superior	6	4*	-
6	Northland	3	3	-
4	Wisconsin–River Falls	2	4	3
5	Wisconsin–Stout	5	1	0

Semifinals; February 28–29
1	Wisconsin–Stevens Point	4	5	-
4	Wisconsin–River Falls	1	1	-
2	Wisconsin–Eau Claire	4	2	-
3	Wisconsin–Superior	1	0	-

Championship; March 7
1	Wisconsin–Stevens Point	2
2	Wisconsin–Eau Claire	4

Note: * denotes overtime period(s)
Note: Mini-games in italics

== 2021 ==
Seed	School	Conference record	Seed	School	Conference record
1	Wisconsin–River Falls	6–3–1–0	4	Wisconsin–Superior	5–3–0–0
2	Wisconsin–Eau Claire	5–2–1–0	5	Wisconsin–Stout	4–6–0–0
3	Wisconsin–Stevens Point	5–3–1–0	6	Northland	0–8–1–0

First Round; March 8
3	Wisconsin–Stevens Point	6
6	Northland	1
4	Wisconsin–Superior	2
5	Wisconsin–Stout	1

Semifinals; March 10
1	~~Wisconsin–River Falls~~	-
4	Wisconsin–Superior	-
2	Wisconsin–Eau Claire	1
3	Wisconsin–Stevens Point	2*

Championship; March 12
4	Wisconsin–Superior	3
3	Wisconsin–Stevens Point	2

Note: * denotes overtime period(s)

== 2022 ==
Seed	School	Conference record	Seed	School	Conference record
1	Wisconsin–Stevens Point	11–2–0–1–0	4	Wisconsin–Stout	6–9–0–0–2
2	Wisconsin–River Falls	9–6–0–1–1	5	Wisconsin–Superior	6–6–1–0–0
3	Wisconsin–Eau Claire	9–6–0–2–1	6	Northland	1–13–1–1–0

First Round; February 18–19
3	Wisconsin–Eau Claire	8	1	-
6	Northland	1	0	-
4	Wisconsin–Stout	0	4	-
5	Wisconsin–Superior	1	7	-

Semifinals; February 25–26
1	Wisconsin–Stevens Point	4	3	-
5	Wisconsin–Superior	3	2	-
2	Wisconsin–River Falls	2	1	-
3	Wisconsin–Eau Claire	3*	3	-

Championship; March 5
1	Wisconsin–Stevens Point	2
3	Wisconsin–Eau Claire	6

Note: * denotes overtime period(s)
Note: Mini-games in italics

== 2023 ==
Seed	School	Conference record	Seed	School	Conference record
1	Wisconsin–Stevens Point	12–2–1–2–0	4	Wisconsin–Stout	6–8–1–0–1
2	Wisconsin–Eau Claire	9–5–1–3–2	5	Wisconsin–River Falls	5–9–1–1–1
3	Wisconsin–Superior	9–5–1–1–1	6	Northland	1–13–1–0–2

First Round; February 17–18
3	Wisconsin–Superior	1	3	1
6	Northland	1	0	0
4	Wisconsin–Stout	4	4	-
5	Wisconsin–River Falls	1	2	-

Semifinals; February 24–25
1	Wisconsin–Stevens Point	4	5	-
4	Wisconsin–Stout	2	0	-
2	Wisconsin–Eau Claire	6*	3	-
3	Wisconsin–Superior	5	0	-

Championship; March 4
1	Wisconsin–Stevens Point	5
2	Wisconsin–Eau Claire	1

Note: * denotes overtime period(s)
Note: Mini-games in italics

== 2024 ==
Seed	School	Conference record	Seed	School	Conference record
1	Wisconsin–Stevens Point	13–2–0–2–0	4	Wisconsin–River Falls	6–7–2–0–0
2	Wisconsin–Eau Claire	10–4–1–1–1	5	Wisconsin–Superior	6–8–1–0–0
3	Wisconsin–Stout	8–7–0–0–2	6	Northland	0–15–0–0–0

First Round; February 16–17
3	Wisconsin–Stout	7	4	-
6	Northland	0	1	-
4	Wisconsin–River Falls	3	1	-
5	Wisconsin–Superior	2	0	-

Semifinals; February 23–24
1	Wisconsin–Stevens Point	4*	4	-
4	Wisconsin–River Falls	4	2	-
2	Wisconsin–Eau Claire	1	5	2**
3	Wisconsin–Stout	2	2	1

Championship; March 2
1	Wisconsin–Stevens Point	5
2	Wisconsin–Eau Claire	1

Note: * denotes overtime period(s)
Note: Mini-games in italics

== 2025 ==
Seed	School	Conference record	Seed	School	Conference record
1	Wisconsin–Superior	11–2–2–3–1–0	4	Wisconsin–River Falls	8–6–1–2–2–1
2	Wisconsin–Stevens Point	10–3–2–1–1–0	5	Wisconsin–Stout	5–9–1–2–4–0
3	Wisconsin–Eau Claire	8–7–0–0–2–0	6	Northland	0–15–0–0–0–0

First Round; February 21–22
3	Wisconsin–Eau Claire	8	4	-
6	Northland	1	0	-
4	Wisconsin–River Falls	4	4	-
5	Wisconsin–Stout	1	0	-

Semifinals; February 28–March 1
1	Wisconsin–Superior	4	1	1
4	Wisconsin–River Falls	1	2	2
2	Wisconsin–Stevens Point	3	2	0
3	Wisconsin–Eau Claire	4	1	1***

Championship; March 8
4	Wisconsin–River Falls	0
3	Wisconsin–Eau Claire	2

Note: * denotes overtime period(s)
Note: Mini-games in italics

== 2026 ==
Seed	School	Conference record
1	Wisconsin–Stout	12–2–1–1–0–1
2	Wisconsin–Eau Claire	11–3–1–2–0–1
3	Wisconsin–River Falls	7–8–0–1–1–0
4	Wisconsin–Superior	6–8–1–0–2–0
5	Wisconsin–Stevens Point	6–8–1–0–1–0

First Round; February 21
4	Wisconsin–Superior	1
5	Wisconsin–Stevens Point	2

Semifinals; February 28
1	Wisconsin–Stout	1
5	Wisconsin–Stevens Point	0
2	Wisconsin–Eau Claire	1
3	Wisconsin–River Falls	4

Championship; March 7
1	Wisconsin–Stout	5
3	Wisconsin–River Falls	4

Note: * denotes overtime period(s)
Note: Mini-games in italics

=== Quarterfinals ===
==== (4) Wisconsin–Superior vs. (5) Wisconsin–Stevens Point ====
February 21	Wisconsin–Superior	1 – 2	Wisconsin–Stevens Point	Wessman Arena
No scoring		First period	Alec Hamady (7) – 00:39
Ikki Kogawa (2) – 11:49		Second period	No scoring
No scoring		Third period	Camden Markham (5) – 14:01
Jan Škorpík (27 saves / 29 shots)		Goalie stats	Alex Proctor (40 saves / 41 shots)

=== Semifinals ===
==== (1) Wisconsin–Stout vs. (5) Wisconsin–Stevens Point ====
February 28	Wisconsin–Stout	1 – 0	Wisconsin–Stevens Point	Fanetti Community Center
No scoring		First period	No scoring
No scoring		Second period	No scoring
13:29 – Noah Tyrrell (3)		Third period	No scoring
Sebastian Monaco (25 saves / 25 shots)		Goalie stats	Alex Proctor (10 saves / 11 shots)

==== (2) Wisconsin–Eau Claire vs. (3) Wisconsin–River Falls ====
February 28	Wisconsin–Eau Claire	1 – 4	Wisconsin–River Falls	Hobbs Municipal Ice Center
No scoring		First period	No scoring
10:03 – Logan Ganz (7)		Second period	Keenan Ingram (25) – 02:48; Dylan Smith (5) – 07:09; Ben Portner (12) – 16:21
No scoring		Third period	Burke Simpson (2) – en – 19:00
Max Gutjahr (25 saves / 28 shots)		Goalie stats	Brennan Boynton (38 saves / 39 shots)

=== Finals ===
==== (1) Wisconsin–Stout vs. (3) Wisconsin–River Falls ====
March 7	Wisconsin–Stout	5 – 4	Wisconsin–River Falls	Fanetti Community Center
No scoring		First period	Cole Teleki (1) – 11:48
01:12 – pp – Nicolas Pigeon (10); 01:27 – Noah Tyrrell (4); 19:07 – Arkhip Sidorovich (10)		Second period	No scoring
02:47 – Nicholas Stevens (8); 12:44 – Kullan Daikawa (7)		Third period	Burke Simpson (3) – 14:14; Dylan Smith (6) – 15:46; Keenan Ingram (26) – 18:15
Sebastian Monaco (24 saves / 28 shots)		Goalie stats	Brennan Boynton (25 saves / 30 shots)

== Championships ==
School	Championships
Wisconsin–Eau Claire	5
Wisconsin–Stevens Point	5
Wisconsin–River Falls	1
Wisconsin–Stout	1
Wisconsin–Superior	1
