= W. L. Zorn Arena =

Arena in Eau Claire, Wisconsin, United States

Coordinates: 44.798932°N 91.498549°W

Zorn Arena
- Interactive map of Zorn Arena
- Full name: Willis L. Zorn Arena
- Address: 105 Garfield Ave. Eau Claire, Wisconsin; United States
- Owner: University of Wisconsin–Eau Claire
- Operator: Wisconsin–Eau Claire Blugolds
- Capacity: 3,300
- Type: Arena
- Current use: Basketball volleyball
- Public transit: ECT: 6 7 15 21

Construction
- Opened: 1952
- Closed: 2024; 2 years ago

Tenants
- Wisconsin–Eau Claire Blugolds teams: basketball, volleyball

W. L. Zorn Arena, more commonly known as Zorn Arena, is an arena located on the campus of University of Wisconsin–Eau Claire in Eau Claire, Wisconsin. The facility was home to the UW-Eau Claire Blugold Men's & Women's Basketball teams, UW-Eau Claire commencement ceremonies and other events (concerts, visiting artists and lecturers). As the home for men's and women's intercollegiate basketball, Zorn Arena seated nearly 2,500, with a total seating capacity with floor seating of 3,300.

Concerts at the Zorn Arena included Johnny Cash in '74, Stevie Ray Vaughan in '85 (he died years later in a helicopter crash in WI), Joan Jett and the Blackhearts in '89, Tony Bennett in '92, The Wallflowers in '97 (with Bob Dylan's son), The Verve Pipe (from MI) in '97, Canadian comedian Howie Mandel in '97, Third Eye Blind with Smash Mouth in '98, Chicago band OK Go in '09, Eau Claire's Bon Iver in 2011 (for 2 nights), American Idol contestant and country singer Danny Gokey from Milwaukee in '16, and MisterWives (with a female singer) in '18, and St. Paul indie band Hippo Campus in 2019.

The facility is named for Willis "Bill" L. Zorn, UW-Eau Claire's former dean of men, director of athletics and head basketball coach. Zorn Arena was part of a larger complex that included three adjoining facilities: Zorn Arena, C.J. Brewer Hall, and the Earl S. Kjer Theatre.

After Zorn Arena entered into disuse, WECU's athletic teams moved their home games to The Sonnentag Center, opened in 2024. Zorn Arena is planned to be demolished in 2025.
