= 2001–02 NCAA Division III men's ice hockey season =

- Duration: October 19, 2001– March 16, 2002
- NCAA tournament: 2002
- National championship: Kenyon Arena; Middlebury, Vermont
- NCAA champion: Wisconsin–Superior
- Sid Watson Award: Jerry Galway (RIT)

The 2001–02 NCAA Division III men's ice hockey season began on October 19, 2001 and concluded on March 16, 2002. This was the 29th season of Division III college ice hockey.

The NCAA expanded the tournament to nine teams. They did this to allow both the east and the west to each receive one at-large bid. The new tournament alignment had all three western teams playing in one quarterfinal (with a First Round game between the 2nd- and 3rd-ranked teams) while the six eastern teams were arranged over the other three quarterfinal series.

== Regular season ==
=== Standings ===
2001–02 ECAC East standings
	Conference							Overall					
	GP	W	L	T	PTS	GF	GA	GP	W	L	T	GF	GA
Division III
Norwich †*	19	15	4	0	30	112	37	32	27	5	0	183	54
New England College	19	9	8	2	20	62	80	27	14	11	2	96	106
MCLA	19	8	8	3	19	63	73	28	14	11	3	91	104
Salem State	19	9	9	1	19	72	61	27	15	11	1	105	83
Southern Maine	19	7	9	3	17	61	67	26	10	13	3	91	91
Babson	19	5	11	3	13	46	70	25	8	14	3	66	88
Massachusetts–Boston	19	3	14	2	8	45	106	25	4	18	3	66	135
Skidmore	19	2	14	3	7	36	91	25	2	20	3	50	116
Division II
Saint Anselm	19	4	10	5	13	56	74	26	9	12	5	88	96
Saint Michael's ~	19	5	13	1	11	46	95	26	11	14	1	79	117
Division III Championship: March 2, 2002; Division II Championship: March 2, 2002 † indicates conference regular season champion * indicates conference tournament champion ~ indicates Division II Tournament champion

2001–02 ECAC Northeast standings
	Conference							Overall					
	GP	W	L	T	PTS	GF	GA	GP	W	L	T	GF	GA
Division III
Lebanon Valley †	15	13	1	1	27	88	22	28	23	4	1	153	48
Massachusetts–Dartmouth	15	13	2	0	26	79	38	25	18	6	1	113	67
Wentworth *	15	13	2	0	26	77	31	30	23	7	0	128	84
Curry	15	11	4	0	22	89	53	25	16	8	1	140	97
Johnson & Wales	15	11	4	0	22	78	45	27	13	14	0	113	105
Fitchburg State	15	9	6	0	18	66	50	26	15	9	2	106	72
Salve Regina	15	8	7	0	16	63	53	25	10	13	2	86	85
Plymouth State	15	7	8	0	14	41	57	22	7	14	1	53	97
Worcester State	15	4	9	2	10	43	46	23	5	15	3	61	87
Suffolk	15	2	12	1	5	41	77	22	4	16	2	73	115
Framingham State	15	2	13	0	4	39	126	24	3	20	1	67	175
Nichols	15	2	13	0	4	34	95	21	4	17	0	58	124
Western New England	15	1	14	0	2	29	78	21	3	18	0	44	110
Division II
Southern New Hampshire	15	10	4	1	21	63	50	24	12	10	2	94	94
Stonehill	15	7	8	0	14	73	53	25	14	11	0	123	100
Assumption	15	4	10	1	9	38	67	25	9	14	2	73	114
Division III Championship: March 3, 2002; Division II Championship: March 2, 2002 † indicates conference regular season champion * indicates conference tournament champions ~ indicates Division II Tournament champion

2001–02 ECAC West standings
	Conference							Overall					
	GP	W	L	T	PTS	GF	GA	GP	W	L	T	GF	GA
RIT †*	10	9	1	0	18	79	21	27	23	2	2	178	50
Elmira	10	8	2	0	16	67	18	27	18	9	0	145	77
Manhattanville	10	5	4	1	11	41	27	26	16	7	3	117	72
Hobart	10	5	5	0	10	38	42	26	10	16	0	85	114
Utica	10	2	7	1	5	30	45	25	10	12	3	80	93
Neumann	10	0	10	0	0	13	115	25	2	23	0	37	215
Championship: March 2, 2002 † indicates conference regular season champion * indicates conference tournament champions

2001–02 NCAA Division III Independent ice hockey standings
	Overall record					
	GP	W	L	T	GF	GA
Scranton	2	0	2	0	6	15

2001–02 Midwest Collegiate Hockey Association standings
	Conference							Overall					
	GP	W	L	T	PTS	GF	GA	GP	W	L	T	GF	GA
Marian †*	16	16	0	0	32	100	22	27	18	7	2	133	66
MSOE	16	8	8	0	16	59	57	25	8	17	0	84	109
Minnesota–Crookston	16	6	10	0	12	64	66	27	8	19	0	89	128
Lawrence	16	6	10	0	12	61	83	28	9	19	0	95	141
Northland	16	4	12	0	8	45	101	26	5	21	0	67	172
Championship: February 24, 2002 † indicates conference regular season champion * indicates conference tournament champions

2001–02 Minnesota Intercollegiate Athletic Conference ice hockey standings
	Conference							Overall					
	GP	W	L	T	Pts	GF	GA	GP	W	L	T	GF	GA
St. Thomas †*	16	13	3	0	26	63	39	28	22	6	0	115	77
Gustavus Adolphus	16	9	3	4	22	54	34	27	14	9	4	91	71
Augsburg	16	10	5	1	21	53	46	26	14	9	3	102	82
Saint John's	16	9	5	2	20	65	40	26	14	10	2	99	77
Concordia (MN)	16	9	6	1	19	62	50	27	13	12	2	96	100
Saint Mary's	16	7	7	2	16	54	47	25	12	10	3	88	73
Hamline	16	4	11	1	9	54	76	25	7	17	1	77	119
St. Olaf	16	2	11	3	7	45	72	25	8	14	3	85	97
Bethel	16	2	14	0	4	42	88	25	6	19	0	72	126
Championship: March 2, 2002 † indicates conference regular season champion * indicates conference tournament champion

2001–02 New England Small College Athletic Conference ice hockey standings
	Conference							Overall					
	GP	W	L	T	PTS	GF	GA	GP	W	L	T	GF	GA
Middlebury †*	19	18	0	1	37	104	24	29	26	2	1	144	43
Bowdoin	19	14	2	3	31	96	38	27	18	6	3	127	61
Hamilton	19	13	5	1	27	88	55	25	14	10	1	103	88
Trinity	19	13	5	1	27	79	33	26	17	8	1	105	55
Williams	19	12	5	2	26	76	45	25	14	9	2	91	68
Colby	19	11	5	3	25	94	53	25	15	7	3	117	69
Amherst	19	6	9	4	16	68	72	25	6	14	5	86	101
Connecticut College	19	6	9	4	16	66	72	24	10	10	4	92	97
Wesleyan	19	5	14	0	10	45	86	24	5	17	2	58	109
Tufts	19	4	15	0	8	54	128	23	6	17	0	76	144
Championship: March 3, 2002 † indicates conference regular season champion * indicates conference tournament champion

2001–02 Northern Collegiate Hockey Association standings
	Conference							Overall					
	GP	W	L	T	Pts	GF	GA	GP	W	L	T	GF	GA
St. Norbert †*	14	12	0	2	26	78	31	31	23	5	3	168	73
Wisconsin–Superior	14	8	3	3	19	63	32	34	24	5	5	172	84
Wisconsin–Stevens Point	14	8	4	2	18	54	42	29	18	9	2	109	85
Wisconsin–River Falls	14	7	5	2	16	49	30	29	18	9	2	108	61
Wisconsin–Eau Claire	14	7	6	1	15	39	39	27	12	13	2	84	87
Lake Forest	14	4	10	0	8	30	55	26	9	15	2	70	94
Wisconsin–Stout	14	4	10	0	8	37	61	27	11	15	1	97	107
St. Scholastica	14	1	13	0	2	27	84	27	5	22	0	65	150
Championship: March 2, 2002 † indicates conference regular season champion * indicates conference tournament champion

2001–02 State University of New York Athletic Conference ice hockey standings
	Conference							Overall					
	GP	W	L	T	PTS	GF	GA	GP	W	L	T	GF	GA
Plattsburgh State †*	14	13	1	0	26	71	25	33	20	9	4	134	76
Oswego State	14	10	3	1	21	72	33	30	17	9	4	122	81
Cortland State	14	7	5	2	16	57	50	29	14	11	4	118	102
Geneseo State	14	7	5	2	16	39	41	29	12	15	2	76	118
Potsdam State	14	6	8	0	12	43	44	27	12	15	0	80	78
Buffalo State	14	5	8	1	11	48	68	27	11	15	1	100	110
Fredonia State	14	3	9	2	8	27	53	24	9	12	3	63	78
Brockport State	14	0	12	2	2	31	74	25	4	19	2	68	113
Championship: March 3, 2002 † indicates conference regular season champion * indicates conference tournament champions

Note: Mini-game are not included in final standings

== Player stats ==
=== Scoring leaders ===
GP = Games played; G = Goals; A = Assists; Pts = Points; PIM = Penalty minutes

Player	Class	Team	GP	G	A	Pts	PIM
Michael Bournazakis	Junior	RIT	26	19	39	58	14
Brian Yingling	Junior	Lebanon Valley	28	27	28	55	22
Kurtis McLean	Freshman	Norwich	32	28	24	52	12
Tony Lawrence	Senior	St. Thomas	28	22	27	49	58
Jerry Galway	Redshirt	RIT	26	13	36	49	24
Joe Savioli	Graduate	Curry	24	18	29	47	38
Michael Carosi	Senior	Bowdoin	27	13	34	47	10
Todd Nowicki	Senior	Buffalo State	27	23	23	46	20
Sean Pero	Freshman	Curry	25	20	26	46	64
Manu Mau'u	Freshman	Johnson & Wales	26	20	26	46	77
David Bagley	Junior	RIT	26	18	28	46	4
Jeff Brodeur	Senior	Fitchburg State	26	18	28	46	52

=== Leading goaltenders ===
GP = Games played; Min = Minutes played; W = Wins; L = Losses; T = Ties; GA = Goals against; SO = Shutouts; SV% = Save percentage; GAA = Goals against average

Player	Class	Team	GP	Min	W	L	T	GA	SO	SV%	GAA
Lincoln Matlock	Senior	Lebanon Valley	14	745	11	1	1	17	1	.928	1.37
Christian Carlsson	Senior	Middlebury	19	1635	26	2	1	38	7	.921	1.39
Kevin Schieve	Freshman	Norwich	22	1323	17	5	0	35	4	.928	1.59
Tyler Euverman	Junior	RIT	24	1452	20	2	0	42	5	.935	1.74
Randy Hervey	Junior	Norwich	11	509	9	0	0	15	1	.922	1.77
Geoff Faulkner	Senior	Trinity	23	1397	15	7	1	45	3	.927	1.93
Kevin Block	Senior	Lebanon Valley	15	878	12	3	0	29	2	.928	1.98
Jacque Vezina	Junior	Wisconsin–River Falls	27	1660	16	9	2	57	5	.918	2.06
Ryan Gill	Sophomore	St. Norbert	21	1224	16	1	3	42	2	.912	2.06
Dan Melde	Sophomore	Gustavus Adolphus	19	1158	9	6	4	41	1	.929	2.12

== 2002 NCAA Tournament ==
First Round; March 6
W2	Wisconsin–Superior	2
W3	St. Thomas	1

Quarterfinals; March 8–10
W1	St. Norbert	4*	2	-
W2	Wisconsin–Superior	4	4	-
RIT	4*	2*	0
Plattsburgh State	4	2	1
Middlebury	6	9	-
Wentworth	0	0	-
Norwich	3	7	-
Bowdoin	0	0	-

Semifinals; March 15
Wisconsin–Superior	5
Plattsburgh State	0
Middlebury	2
Norwich	5

National Championship; March 16
Wisconsin–Superior	3*
Norwich	2

Note: * denotes overtime period(s)
Note: Mini-games in italics

== See also ==
- 2001–02 NCAA Division I men's ice hockey season
