= Chippewa Valley Regional Airport =

Airport in Chippewa County, Wisconsin, US

- IATA: EAU; ICAO: KEAU; FAA LID: EAU

Summary
- Airport type: Public
- Owner: Eau Claire County
- Serves: Eau Claire, Wisconsin
- Location: Chippewa County
- Time zone: CST (UTC−06:00)
  - Summer (DST): CDT (UTC−05:00)
- Elevation AMSL: 913 ft (278 m)
- Coordinates: 44°51′57″N 091°29′03″W
- Public transit access: ECT: 3
- Website: www.chippewavalleyairport.com

Maps
- FAA airport diagram

- Location of airport in Wisconsin EAU (the United States)

Runways
Direction	Length		Surface
Direction	ft	m	Surface
4/22	8,101	2,469	Concrete/treated
14/32	5,000	1,524	Asphalt/concrete

Statistics (12 months ending August 2026 ^{except where noted})
- Passenger volume: 50,460
- Departing passengers: 25,210
- Scheduled flights: 633
- Cargo (lb.): 18k
- Aircraft operations (2022): 18,897
- Based aircraft (2024): 91
- Source: Federal Aviation Administration

Chippewa Valley Regional Airport (IATA: EAU, ICAO: KEAU, FAA LID: EAU) is a public use airport in Chippewa County, Wisconsin, United States. Chippewa Valley Regional Airport (EAU) is a non-hub primary commercial service airport owned by Eau Claire County and located three miles north of downtown Eau Claire, Wisconsin. It serves as the largest airport in northwestern Wisconsin, covering 1,100 acres with two runways and providing facilities for general aviation, air cargo, and commercial flights. The airport offers scheduled service to Chicago O'Hare through United Express, operated by SkyWest Airlines, and seasonal service to Florida through Sun Country Airlines.

It is the largest airport in the 30-county northern Wisconsin area and serves primarily the Chippewa Valley region, operating on a budget approved by a commission equally representing the interests of Chippewa, Dunn and Eau Claire counties.

The airport is mainly used for general aviation and business travel; the Eau Claire-based Menards corporation uses CVRA to base their fleet of aircraft to serve their stores throughout the Midwest. It is occasionally used as an alternative landing site for flights bound for Minneapolis-Saint Paul International Airport. As of December 2022, only one commercial airline, Sun Country Airlines, provides service for CVRA to Minneapolis International. In December 2024, United Airlines announced the start of regional service to its hub at Chicago O'Hare.

The airport is included in the Federal Aviation Administration (FAA) National Plan of Integrated Airport Systems for 2025–2029, in which it is categorized as a non-hub primary commercial service facility. It is the eighth busiest of eight commercial airports in Wisconsin in terms of passengers served.

== History ==
In 1923, 80 acres (320,000 m^{2}) of land in Putnam Heights were purchased to build an airport. In 1929, Eau Claire Airways was started at the airport, offering training and scheduled taxi service to destinations in Wisconsin and Minnesota.

In 1939, work on a new airport started north of Eau Claire. In 1940, Eau Claire County Airport started operations at its current site. Eau Claire Municipal Airport opened in 1945, while Chippewa Valley Regional Airport was officially opened in 1947 with the arrival of a Northwest Airlines DC-3. At this time, Eau Claire had three airports. Upgrades at Chippewa Valley Regional Airport were made in further decades, with a terminal addition in 1981. Another terminal remodeling and expansion was completed in 2009.

A new $3.9 million 65 feet (20 m) control tower was built in 2005 and opened in November 2006. Passenger loading used to be from the ramp until a jetbridge was installed in the spring of 2011.

In 2015, the Airport Commission Room was renamed the Duax Commission Room after long-time airport supporter and former airport commissioner David Duax.

In July 2024, the airport board voted to support the return of SkyWest Airlines despite the community's overwhelming support for keeping the incumbent carrier, Sun Country Airlines. Sun Country's bid would have continued service to four nonstop destinations from Eau Claire in contrast to SkyWest's one city, Chicago. Sun Country posted the highest number of enplanements seen at the airport in the last 15 years in 2023.

SkyWest previously served the airport as an Essential Air Service provider until November 2022, before choosing to leave the market. The Essential Air Service bid was approved by the Department of Transportation, SkyWest resumed with flights to O'Hare International Airport on December 13, 2024.

== Facilities and aircraft ==
Chippewa Valley Regional Airport covers an area of 1,100 acres (450 ha) at an elevation of 913.1 feet (278.3 m) above mean sea level. It has two runways: the primary runway 4/22 is 8,101 by 150 feet (2,469 x 46 m) with a concrete surface and the crosswind runway 14/32 is 5,000 by 100 feet (1,524 x 30 m) with an asphalt/concrete surface.

For the 12-month period ending December 31, 2022, the airport had 18,897 aircraft operations, an average of 52 per day: 88% general aviation, 10% air taxi, 2% military and less than 1% scheduled commercial. In August 2024, there were 91 aircraft based at this airport: 63 single-engine, 10 multi-engine, 15 jet, 2 helicopter and 1 military.

== Airlines and destinations ==
=== Passenger ===
On behalf of United Airlines, SkyWest operated 1-2 daily flights to Chicago-O'Hare until 2022. On March 10, 2022, SkyWest announced its intention to end its service into EAU. After the announcement, the Wisconsin Department of Transportation began seeking bids for a new carrier to provide service. Three airlines submitted bids to provide service to the regional airport: Boutique Air, Southern Airways Express, and Sun Country Airlines.

After an endorsement from the airport, as well as a recommendation from the airport commission, the United States Department of Transportation selected Sun Country Airlines to provide service to EAU.

In 2024, SkyWest resumed flights at Eau Claire, taking back over from Sun Country for regular service. Sun Country remained with seasonal service to Florida through April.

Airlines	Destinations
Sun Country Airlines	Seasonal: Fort Myers, Las Vegas
United Express	Chicago–O'Hare

Destinations map
Destination from Chippewa Valley Regional Airport
Red = Year-round destination
Green = Seasonal destination
Blue = Future destination
Purple = Route ending

Throughout the years, numerous airlines have served Eau Claire including North Central Airlines, Republic Airlines (1979-1986), Lakeland Airlines, Northwest Airlines, Mesaba Airlines, Skyway Airlines, Air Wisconsin, American Central Airlines, Great Lakes Aviation, Big Sky Airlines and charter airlines. Allegiant Airlines and Sun Country Airlines often run charter service to popular destinations.

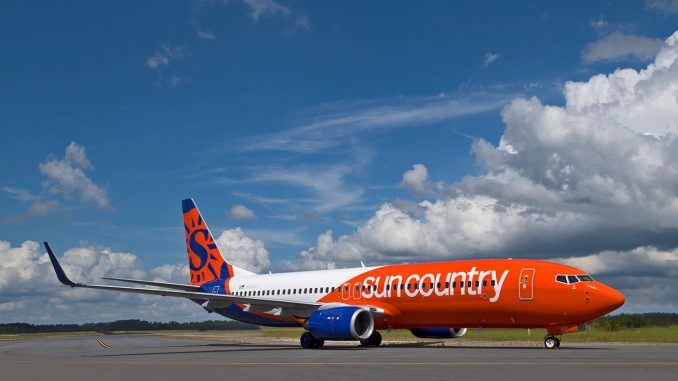
Sun Country Boeing 737-800 in the newest livery

=== Statistics ===
Carrier shares (September 2025 – August 2026)
Carrier	Passengers (arriving and departing)
SkyWest Airlines	43,850(86.90%)
Sun Country	6,610(13.10%)

Top domestic destinations (September 2025 – August 2026)
Rank	Airport	Passengers	Airline
1	Chicago–O'Hare International (ORD)	22,010	United
2	Fort Myers Southwest Florida International (RSW)	3,200	Sun Country

== Ground transportation ==
Public transit to the airport is provided by Eau Claire Transit. Route 3 runs from the Airport to downtown Eau Claire on weekdays. On Saturdays, Route 3/4 stops on Starr Avenue outside the airport, while no service to the airport is provided on Sundays.

== Accidents and incidents ==
- On April 11, 2015, a Quad City Challenger II crashed just south of Eau Claire while operating at the Rosenbaum Field Airport (3WI9). The pilot was fatally injured. The aircraft entered a steep dive while in a downwind at 3WI9.

== See also ==
- Eau Claire Transit
- List of airports in Wisconsin

== Other sources ==
- Essential Air Service documents (Docket OST-2009-0160) from the U.S. Department of Transportation:
  - Order 2012-1-24 (January 26, 2012): tentatively re-selecting SkyWest Airlines, Inc. to provide Essential Air Service (EAS) with subsidy rates as follows: Eau Claire, Wisconsin, $1,733,576; Hancock/Houghton, Michigan, $934,156; Muskegon, Michigan, $1,576,067; and Paducah, Kentucky, $1,710,775.
  - Order 2012-2-2 (February 1, 2012): makes final the selection of SkyWest Airlines, Inc., to provide Essential Air Service at Eau Claire, Wisconsin; Hancock/Houghton, Michigan; and Paducah, Kentucky (at Muskegon, the selection of SkyWest was not finalize at this time).
  - Order 2013-10-8 (October 21, 2013): reselecting Delta Air Lines, Inc., to provide Essential Air Service (EAS) at Pellston and Sault Ste. Marie, Michigan; and SkyWest Airlines, at Paducah, Kentucky; Hancock/Houghton, and Muskegon, Michigan; and Eau Claire, Wisconsin. The Order also tentatively reselects American Airlines, at Watertown, New York. Eau Claire, Wisconsin: Docket 2009-0306; effective Period: January 1, 2014, through January 31, 2016; Service: Fourteen (14) nonstop round trips per week to Chicago O'Hare (ORD); Aircraft Type: CRJ-200; Annual Subsidy: $1,546,536.
