= HOM Furniture =

American furniture store chain

- Company type: Privately held company
- Industry: furniture retailer
- Founded: 1973; 53 years ago
- Headquarters: Coon Rapids, Minnesota, US
- Number of locations: 17 (2024)
- Key people: Rod Johansen, President; Wayne Johansen, Chairman
- Number of employees: 950
- Website: www.homfurniture.com

HOM Furniture is a privately owned American furniture retailer with 17 stores in the Midwestern United States. HOM's corporate headquarters are in Coon Rapids, Minnesota, where approximately 300 of its 950 total employees work as of 2024.

Notable HOM locations include anchor stores in the Oakwood Mall in Eau Claire, Wisconsin, Shingle Creek Crossing in Brooklyn Center, Minnesota, the Southern Hills Mall in Sioux City, Iowa, and Miller Trunk Corridor in Duluth, Minnesota.

== History ==
In 1973, HOM founder Wayne Johansen started JC Imports in Minnesota, a wholesale and retail import gift business, before expanding into waterbed sales in 1979 and later establishing the HOM Furniture brand in 1996.

HOM acquired Gabberts Furniture in 2008 and rebranded it as Gabberts Design Studio and Fine Furniture. The brand previously had locations in Dallas and Fort Worth, Texas, and a flagship location in Edina, Minnesota. There are currently two Gabberts locations, one each in Bloomington and Little Canada.

A discount furniture store called DOCK86 was launched by HOM in 2010. The first location opened in Little Canada, later expanding to seven locations in three states. The brand name draws inspiration from the term to "86" something, or quickly get rid of it. DOCK86 is focused on "cutting out middle men, high overhead and high pressure sales" to ensure customer savings.

== Community ==
HOM Furniture partners with the Minnesota Adult and Teen Challenge, the Minnesota Ovarian Cancer Alliance, and KSTP-TV, as well as The Salvation Army and Ronald McDonald House.
