= Oakwood Mall (Eau Claire, Wisconsin) =

Coordinates: 44.77547°N 91.44172°W

- Location: Eau Claire, Wisconsin
- Opened: October 15, 1986; 40 years ago
- Developer: General Growth Properties
- Manager: GGP
- Owner: GGP
- Num. of stores: 91
- Num. of anchor tenants: 6 (5 open, 1 vacant)
- Floor area: 818,689 square feet (76,058.7 m^{2})
- Floors: 1
- Public transit: ECT: 1 6
- Website: www.oakwoodmall.com

Oakwood Mall is an enclosed shopping mall in Eau Claire, Wisconsin. The anchor stores are HOM Furniture, JCPenney, Hobby Lobby, Scheels, and Micon Cinemas. There is one vacant anchor store that was once Sears.

== History ==
The mall opened on October 15, 1986, and underwent a major renovation in 1996. The mall also features a movie theater, which was expanded in 1997 and originally operated by Carmike Cinemas until 2017, when it was re-branded as AMC.

The shopping center has seen several changes in its anchor stores over the years. In 2002, Younkers replaced Target as one of the main tenants. However, the mall has faced some challenges since the late 2010s, as several of its anchors closed due to bankruptcy and the nationwide downturn in traditional retail. Macy's, which had been at the mall since 1991 as Dayton's and later as Marshall Field's, closed in March 2017 and was replaced by Hobby Lobby in August 2018. Younkers followed suit and closed in August 2018, leaving a vacant space that was later purchased by HOM Furniture in January 2019. The furniture store opened in early 2020 after extensive renovations. Sears, another longtime anchor, closed in November 2018 and has not been replaced. The AMC theater also closed permanently in October 2022, after struggling with the effects of the COVID-19 pandemic and competition from streaming services. A local theater chain, Micon Cinemas, took over the space and reopened the 12 screen cineplex in December that same year.
