= History of Sioux City, Iowa =

Iowa is in the tallgrass prairie of the North American Great Plains, historically inhabited by speakers of Siouan languages. The area of Sioux City, Iowa was inhabited by Yankton Sioux when it was first reached by Spanish and French furtrappers in the 18th century. In 1803, during the presidency of Thomas Jefferson, France sold a vast portion of central North America to the United States of America. This "Louisiana Purchase" was largely unexplored by white settlers. Jefferson sent out the Corps of Discovery, under Lewis and Clark, to scientifically document the territory. In 1804 the Lewis and Clark expedition traveled up the Missouri and set-up camp near what would become Sioux City, Iowa. On August 20, a member of the expedition, Sgt. Charles Floyd died of "bilous colic" and was buried on a bluff overlooking the river. At the time of Lewis and Clark, the Omaha tribe of Native Americans were present just downstream from this region, and the Yankton Sioux were upstream. William Thompson established a trading post near Floyd's Bluff in 1848, and had early ambitions for founding a city. However, Thompson's hopes were never realized; settlers further upriver, between the Floyd and Big Sioux rivers, met with more success.

== Settlement and founding ==
Theophile Bruguier, a French-Canadian fur trader, is considered the first white settler on land that would become Sioux City. According to one legend, he told his friend Chief War Eagle of the Yankton Sioux about a dream he had regarding a rich land where two rivers joined near a high bluff. War Eagle told him that he knew of this land, near the mouth of the Big Sioux River. In reality, Bruguier had already passed this place many times in his voyages between Fort Pierre in the Dakota Territory and St. Louis, Missouri as an agent for the American Fur Company. In 1849, Bruguier established his farm on this same land; this farm included log cabins and tipis used by the family of War Eagle. Bruguier claimed all the land from the mouth of the Big Sioux River east along the Missouri River to near the Floyd River. In 1852 he sold the land from Perry Creek east to the Floyd River to Joseph Leonais. At about that time, Bruguier encouraged James A. Jackson, a fur trade outfitter from Council Bluffs (then Kanesville), to come upriver to establish a trading post. Jackson, in turn, convinced his father-in-law, Dr. John K. Cook, of the area's potential as a future city; Cook, an English-born Oxford University-educated physician turned frontier surveyor, was most impressed by the location at the mouths of the Big Sioux and Floyd Rivers at the Missouri. In his official capacity as United States Federal Government surveyor, Dr. Cook established the little town of Sioux City in 1854, staking out its lots and streets. Joseph Leonais, who owned much of the land which would become the downtown area, sold it to Dr. Cook after much haggling for $3000. Within 3 years the new town had a population of 400 people and incorporated as a city.

== Nineteenth century ==
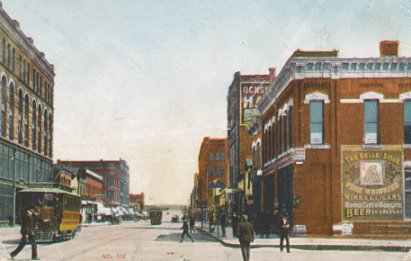
Sioux City at the start of the 1900s; Fourth Street, looking east from Virginia.

The first steamboat arrived from St. Louis in June 1856, loaded with ready-framed houses and provisions.

The railroad first arrived in 1868. About that time a few small factories opened. In 1873, James Booge opened the first large-scale meatpacking plant and created a demand which ultimately led to the opening of the livestock yards ("stockyards") in 1884. The period from about 1880 to 1890 marked the most rapid and significant progress made thus far in Sioux City's development. In 1880 Sioux City had a population of 7,500.; in 1884, 15,514; in 1886, 22,358; in 1887, 30,842; and in 1890, 38,700. Street cars, water works, electric lights and other improvements appeared. Factories, jobbing houses, meatpacking plants, retail stores and railroads increasingly came on the scene. The city's building boom included an elevated railroad (the Sioux City Elevated Railway) and early "skyscrapers". These changes mirrored growth that was occurring nationwide, especially in the transition of small pioneer settlements to thriving urban centers. President Grover Cleveland visited in 1887, by then Fourth Street was the center of the business district.

Sioux City is also the birthplace of the Corn Palace, a temporary building made each year as part of the Corn Festival. The Sioux City Corn Palaces were large wooden buildings with corn cobs nailed to their walls. The first Corn Palace was built in 1887, and was designed by architect W.E. Loft. The Corn Palace became larger and grander every year. The last Sioux City Corn Palace, built in 1891, sprawled across the city's downtown area. The palace had three towers, one of which stretched 200 feet tall. It also had a large tunnel, which allowed traffic to pass right beneath its center.

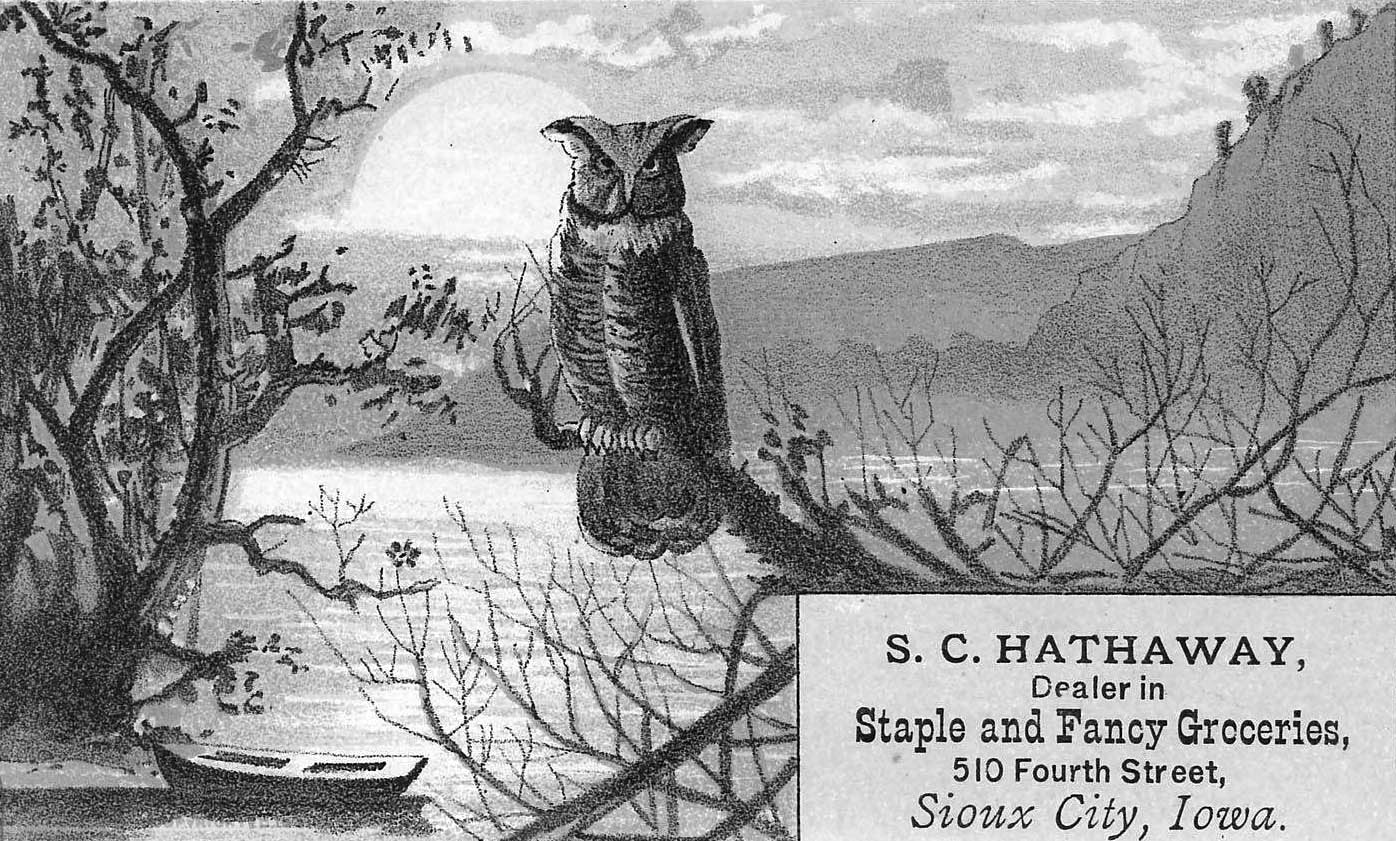
Trade card advertisement, circa 1885

But bad weather brought a poor turnout for the 1891 Corn Festival, as the building was unheated. The Great Floyd River Flood of 1892 drowned any further hopes for the festival, and Corn Palaces were never built in Sioux City again.

In May 1892, heavy rains caused the Floyd River to rise, sending a destructive wave of muddy water through the unprepared city. At least three thousand people were left homeless. The stockyards and railroad lines were all badly damaged, and a lumber yard caught fire. The final death toll from drowning was twenty-five, according to the Army Corps of Engineers.

The nationwide Financial Panic of 1893 resulted in number of real estate investors and entrepreneurs in Sioux City losing great paper fortunes. Edwin Peters, the developer and promoter of Morningside, claimed to have lost $1.5 million, only to be left with a debt of $7,000.

In 1898, all units of the Iowa National Guard—the 49th, 50th, 51st and 52nd Infantry Regiments, as well as artillery and cavalry units—were called to active duty in the War with Spain. The 49th and 50th entrained for South Florida but did not reach Cuba. The 51st was sent to the Philippines and engaged in combat action there. The 52nd remained stateside.

== Twentieth century ==
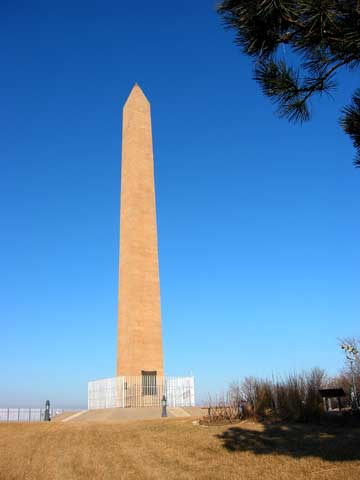
Floyd Monument

The beginning of the twentieth century saw a population of 33,000.

=== 1900–1910 ===
==== Floyd Monument ====
In 1900, on a high bluff overlooking the Missouri River, construction began on the 100' tall Floyd Monument, a stone obelisk honoring the burial site of Sgt. Charles Floyd. Floyd died near here while exploring the region with the Lewis and Clark expedition in 1804. The monument, which was completed in 1901, was later recognized by the U.S. Department of Interior as the First National Historic Landmark, in 1960.

==== John Peirce fraud ====
In 1900, Sioux Cityans and the rest of the country were the victims of a fraud perpetrated by former Sioux City land speculator, developer, and (later) notorious wheeler-dealer John Peirce. Peirce was a colorful and flamboyant character, a decorated Union Army veteran wounded in the Civil War, and a major promoter during Sioux City's 19th-century boom years. Until fairly recently, Sioux City historians and civic promoters held Peirce in high esteem for his years of seeming dedication to the growth of Sioux City, especially of the North Side. More recent investigation has shown that in the end Peirce was a very clever scoundrel who actually got away with his crime. Like most other businessman, Peirce had been hurt very badly by the financial panic of 1893. While most of Sioux City's leading businessmen honorably spent years working and rebuilding to pay back their debts, Peirce began scheming for a way to bilk the public out of the funds he needed to effect his relocation to the west coast. In 1900, he initiated a nationwide lottery to dispose of his northside mansion (which later became the Sioux City Museum). About 40,000 tickets were sold at one dollar each. The drawing took place at the Union passenger depot on Christmas Eve of 1900. It was first announced that the winner was a jeweler from Vinton, Iowa. However, a few days later, it emerged that the winning ticket was actually held by a New York millionaire, William Barbour. (Peirce had owed a hefty financial debt to Mr. Barbour.) The abstract for the Peirce Mansion reveals that a warranty deed transferred title to Barbour nine days before the actual drawing and nineteen days before Barbour was publicly known to hold the winning lottery ticket. Barbour promptly sold the mansion to William Gordon, in exchange for bonds which were issued by the company operating the Combination Bridge. Peirce, a flamboyant figure to be sure, wrote an emotional goodbye to Sioux City in the newspaper before heading west. Peirce collected his money and disappeared from Sioux City forever.

==== Pelletier fire ====
On December 23, 1904, Sioux City suffered one of its greatest calamities when a fire broke out in the basement of the Pelletier Department Store on the southwest corner of Fourth and Jackson Streets. The fire ignited when a store employee lit a match in a Christmas toy display area of the basement floor to ignite a gas jet to illuminate the display. The head of the match flew off and landed in mounds of cotton that had been used to simulate snow drifts. The room went up like a torch, and the fire quickly spread throughout the multi-story building. The Sioux City Fire Department was neither manned nor equipped to suppress a rapidly spreading high-rise fire, whipped by wind gusts that quickly spread the flames to neighboring buildings. Two and a half blocks of the downtown district were gutted by fire. Only one person died in the catastrophe, but the loss in property was in the millions of dollars. Sioux City business investors lost little time in rebuilding the core business district.

=== 1911–1920 ===
==== Free speech fight ====
In the winter of 1914, the Industrial Workers of the World (IWW) chose Sioux City as the site of one of its many free speech fights. The goal was to organize both industrial and agricultural farm laborers into one big union to pressure management for better wages and shorter hours. Some community leaders—notably the enlightened Pastor and future Populist Republican Mayor Wallace Mertin Short—strongly defended the rights of the workers to exercise free speech, while not endorsing or condoning the radical and often violent tactics of the IWW. As in all of the IWW free speech fights of that era, once word of such a demonstration went out over the "bush telegraph," thousands upon thousands of unemployed men made their way into the city by foot or on freight cars. The center of activity was in the 800 block of Fourth Street, where Sioux City Police on horseback, assisted by Iowa National Guardsmen, engaged in skirmishing. Hundreds of unemployed laborers were arrested until, jails full, city fathers bodily expelled them aboard freight cars, which delivered them to isolated locations outside the city.

==== First World War ====
When the United States declared war on Germany in April 1917, Iowa had 3 National Guard regiments, the 1st, 2nd and 3rd. The 3rd Iowa was federalized immediately as the new 168th Infantry Regiment and became part of the new 42nd "Rainbow" Division made up of guard troops from 26 states. Organized and trained at Camp Mills, New York, the 42nd was the first American combat division to reach the front lines in France. After extensive advanced combat training under supervision of French officers for a period of 90 days, the 168th entered the front lines in February 1918. Many of the members of Company L were from Sioux City, Northwest Iowa and Southeast South Dakota.

Meanwhile, Company L of the 2nd Iowa Infantry Regiment, made up of National Guardsmen primarily from Council Bluffs, Sioux City and other western Iowa communities, was ordered to Camp Dodge, Des Moines in May 1917. There the Company L men joined other companies of the 2nd Iowa drawn from across the state, After getting organized and equipped at Camp Dodge from May through August, the 2nd Iowa National Guard Regiment finally embarked by troop train for Camp Cody, Deming, New Mexico—one of 32 national army training cantonments.

Arriving at Cody in September 1917, the 2nd Iowa was sworn into federal service and on 28 September the old 2nd Iowa became the 133rd Infantry Regiment of the newly created 34th "Sandstorm" Division. The 34th remained in training at Camp Cody until late summer 1918, when it finally received orders to France. After a full year living and training in primitive and dust-storm conditions at this bleak desert outpost just 30 miles from the Mexican border, most of the men of the 133rd Infantry were happy to be headed overseas and desirous of getting into the fight. The division was held up at Ft. Dix, New Jersey for a couple of weeks due to the worldwide influenza pandemic, but ultimately most of the combat units of the division arrived safely in England and from there moved onward to Le Mans, France by October 1918. Upon arrival at Le Mans, the War Department determined that the 34th Division would not be needed on the Western Front and the entire division was disestablished. However, most of the infantrymen were assigned to casual detachments and sent to other army units at the front as replacements.

By this time the 168th Infantry, which had arrived in France eight months earlier, had spent 174 continuous days in combat and had suffered heavy casualties in repelling the German offensive of May 1918 and during the Meuse-Argonne counter-offensive that summer. Thus, many men from the 133rd Infantry were sent as replacements to the 168th infantry, and several of these were with the Rainbow Division in its final combat action of the war—the assault on Sedan 4–9 November 1918. Following the Armistice of 11 November, these same Sioux City soldiers also were part of the 168th Infantry's "watch on the Rhine,": being stationed at Niederzeissen, Germany, until 9 May 1919. Those men who had not returned from France immediately after the Armistice were finally shipped home from Germany, arriving at Camp Dodge on the 18th of May. The men received their discharges on 19 May 1919 and returned to Sioux City.

In addition to the 133rd and 168th Infantry regiments made up of Iowa National Guardsmen, hundreds more Sioux City men enlisted or were drafted into regular Army, Marine Corps and Navy units during the war.

In 1919, more than 1400 Sioux City veterans of the Great War gathered to form Monahan Post No. 64 of the American Legion, named in honor of Private Edward Monahan of Sioux City, who had been the first man of the 168th Infantry Regiment killed in action in France. Private Monahan, in addition to giving his life, had distinguished himself in combat, having been mentioned in dispatches and also having been posthumously awarded the French Croix de Guerre Medal with Palm by the French government.

In 1921, the city of Sioux City, in partnership with civic and veterans groups, designated a stretch of Stone Park Boulevard as the "Memorial Mile" by planting a tree to commemorate every Sioux City serviceman killed in the "war to end all wars."

=== The Enlightened Governance of Wallace M. Short, 1918-1923 ===
A Phi Beta Kappa graduate of Yale University and author of several books, Congregationalist Minister Wallace Mertin Short was one of the most educated individuals to hold elected municipal office in Sioux City. After crossing swords over the issue of temperance with the national elders of the Congregationalist Church and being officially de-frocked as minister of that church's Sioux City congregation, Short rented a movie house on Fourth Street and founded a successful non-denominational church open to all. He appealed to the downtrodden and dregs of society and enjoyed rubbing elbows in Sioux City taverns with common laborers. Short suffered from severe insomnia, and made no secret of the fact that he consumed a large glass of beer every evening to help him sleep. Such an admission from a man of the cloth was considered scandalous at that time.

Short garnered sufficient backing from organized labor to win electoral office and went on to serve three terms as Mayor, from 1918 to 1924. Using the Mayor's office as his pulpit, Short became a powerful spokesman for the rights of the working class and of the ethnic minorities who made up a significant percentage of Sioux City's 70,000 citizens in 1918. He embraced the Industrial Workers of the World and spoke publicly on their behalf when thousands of them congregated in the city to wage a "free speech" fight in 1914. While Short's pro-union sentiments and actions resulted in an incorrect and unfair legacy of "socialist," Short was in fact a progressive Republican who possessed a deep sense of social justice and whose faith in the U.S. Constitution and Bill of Rights frequently put him at odds not only with fellow clergymen but also with the large industrialists of the city. At the same time, Mayor Short's sometimes naive faith in appointed members of his city administration resulted in several scandals for which he, as chief executive, must ultimately take the blame. For example, his friendship with local labor unions resulted in the appointment of an alcoholic union boss to head the city's Department of Public Safety during his first term. When the Rush building collapsed in 1918 killing 39 citizens (see below), this Public Safety Commissioner arrived on the scene of the disaster in an inebriated condition and started handing out whiskey to the city firefighters and policemen on rescue duty. This commissioner, who had previously served as boss of the Sign Painter's Union in Sioux City, had virtually no experience in law enforcement or public safety and was eventually dismissed from his post and run out of town, apparently by friends of Mayor Short.

Short described Sioux City as a "working man's town." Even before taking elected office, Short campaigned against the Temperance Movement and opposed Prohibition, not on moral grounds, but on the principal that alcohol consumption was a personal choice, and not something to be controlled or governed from Des Moines or Washington, D.C. Mayor Short remained a committed Republican for the remainder of his life and went on to hold office in the Iowa legislature until 1932, when the Democrats came into office. Short's administration of Sioux City during a decade of both turbulence and meteoric economic growth between 1918 and 1928 brought excellent, level-headed government policies. Unfortunately, not one street, building or park has ever been named in Short's honor.

==== Ruff Building/Hedges Block fire ====
On June 29, 1918, Sioux City suffered its greatest accidental loss of life when the four-story Ruff Pharmaceutical building (the Hedges Block at Fourth & Douglas Streets) collapsed. At the time of the disaster, workmen were gutting the upper floors and preparing to lower part of the first floor to ground level. Meanwhile, retail activities had been allowed to continue at street level. The building suddenly collapsed, trapping scores of victims in the rubble. Gas mains ruptured, causing a massive fire that required 36 hours to contain. In typical city government fashion of the day, the City Public Safety Commissioner arrived on the scene and handed out bottles of whiskey to firemen and other rescuers. Thirty-nine people died in what became known as "the Ruff Disaster."

=== 1921–1930 ===
The population grew to 71,227 at the 1920 census, making Sioux City the 99th largest city in the United States. In 1932 and 1933 a farmers strike occupied the city for some time, preventing food shipments in protest of very low agricultural prices. National Guardsmen of the 133rd Infantry, based at Sioux City, were called into service for 2 weeks by the Governor to patrol the strike at Cherokee, Iowa.

==== Corruption scandal ====
A major scandal erupted in Sioux City in 1935, two years after the Volstead Prohibition Act was repealed, when it was discovered that corrupt Iowa state officials—including the Iowa State Attorney General and leaders of the Iowa State Alcohol Control Board—were operating a profitable extortion scheme to offer "protection" to local Sioux City tavern owners in exchange for payoff money. The Attorney General was arrested, tried and convicted in the Woodbury County Courthouse. It seems that the legalization of alcohol only provided corrupt state officials waiting in the wings an opportunity to profit from Sioux City's profound love of alcoholic beverages—control over which had, until recently, been the sole domain of organized bootleggers.

=== 1941–1950 ===
==== World War Two ====
With war clouds on the horizon in Europe, Companies L and M and the Howitzer Company (37mm antitank), 133rd Iowa Infantry Regiment were called to active federal service in 1941. Upon mobilization, the 133rd Infantry was made a part of the U.S. 34th ("Red Bull") Infantry Division, which had been deactivated by the War Department in October 1918. The Iowa guardsmen had participated in all-Army maneuvers at Camp Claiborne, Louisiana in 1940, and were among the first to be federalized. Companies L, M and the Howitzer Company, all from Sioux City, were among the first Americans sent to Europe when they landed in Londonderry, Northern Ireland early in the war. From Northern Ireland, the unit sailed for the Mediterranean Theater, where it saw its first combat in North Africa. In the first major U.S. offensive ground action against Germany in World War Two, the 34th Division was ambushed and badly mauled by German Panzer and mechanized infantry units at Kasserine Pass, Tunisia, in 1943. The division suffered horrendous casualties, including many POWs. Later reconstituted, the 34th saw subsequent combat in Italy.

==== Air Base ====
Early in World War II, the U.S. Army established a major training base at Sioux City, located at Sergeant Bluff, Iowa, 8 miles (13 km) south of downtown. New, large runways were constructed to facilitate heavy bomber operations, and the Sioux City Army Air Base became one of the prime locations for B-17 heavy bomber basic flight qualification training as well as home to various support and maintenance units. Hollywood actor and Pilot-Captain (later Colonel) Jimmy Stewart was posted to Sioux City with his squadron in 1943, where he and his crew completed their initial B-17 qualification prior to deployment overseas. Just following the war, in December 1946, the 185th Iowa Air National Guard unit was established at Sioux City.

==== Swift Packing Plant Explosion ====
On December 14, 1949, the large Swift & Company packing house, located north of the Sioux City Stockyards and adjacent to the Floyd River channel, suddenly exploded, killing 21 Swift employees. The cause of the disaster was never fully confirmed, but the explosion was believed to have been caused by a leaking gas pipe.

In 1950 Sioux City had a population of about 84,000.

=== 1951–1960 ===
==== Burial of John Raymond Rice ====
In August 1951, the funeral of Sergeant John Raymond Rice, who had been killed in action in the Korean War, was interrupted by a cemetery worker who noticed that Ho-Chunk Indians were among the mourners. The worker hurried to inform cemetery officials who removed Rice's body from the cemetery, informing the bereaved that non-whites were not allowed to be buried in the white cemetery. President Truman sent an apology to Rice's family and permitted reburial in Arlington National Cemetery. The incident heightened hostility towards non-whites throughout the city, and Black baseball rookie Willie Mays's manager, who had initially recruited him for the Sioux City Soos, redirected him towards another farm team as a precaution.

==== Missouri River flood ====
In the spring of 1952 the Missouri River rushed out of its banks and inundated downtown Sioux City. Many area communities were also flooded. It was in the aftermath of the 1952 flood that numerous cases of polio were reported in Sioux City and throughout the tri-state area. The polio epidemic hit this region of the country especially hard and lasted until vaccine was developed to combat the disease in the late 1950s.

==== Floyd River flood ====
On June 8, 1953, the Floyd River again flooded when a torrential downpour in the Sheldon, Iowa area sent a wall of water down into the lower valley. Fourteen people lost their lives. This flood was a major impetus for the Floyd River flood control project, including the building of a straightened, rock-lined channel and high levee through the city. The flood-prone "South Bottoms" neighborhood was razed for this project in 1962.

=== 1961–1970 ===
==== All America City ====
In 1962 Sioux City was named an All America City by the National Civic League.

==== River Cade ====
The Sioux City Chamber and other leading civic groups organized River Cade, a week-long celebration of Summer and Sioux City history in 1964. The event has been held along the Missouri River front ever since, marked by an official street parade, a carnival, boat races, children's events and a grand ball.

==== Vietnam War ====
In 1967, with the Vietnam War escalating under the Johnson Administration, the U.S. Naval Reserve Construction Battalion (SEABEEs), based at Sioux City Naval Reserve Training Center, was called to active duty and deployed as part of Naval Construction Battalion (NCB) 2 to Danang, South Vietnam. These Sioux City Navy men frequently served under direct enemy sniper and artillery fire while engaged in building bases for the Navy and Marine Corps in the Danang area during their 13-month deployment. They served bravely, suffered casualties and returned with honor to their peacetime jobs as Sioux City construction men.

==== U.S.S. Pueblo Incident ====
In February 1968, in direct response to the seizure by North Korea of a U.S. Navy surveillance vessel off the coast of North Korea, the 185th Tactical Fighter Squadron, Iowa Air National Guard, based in Sioux City, was activated for federal service. The squadron deployed to Phu Cat Air Base, Republic of Vietnam (South Vietnam). Members of the unit served with distinction in combat during their 12-month overseas deployment. The 185th suffered both killed in action and missing in action casualties before inactivation and return to Sioux City.

Likewise in 1968, Headquarters & Headquarters Company, along with Company L, 133rd Infantry, Iowa National Guard based at Sioux City, were also placed on alert and sent into federal service at Fort Carson Colorado following the Pueblo Incident. Although anxious to deploy overseas as a fighting unit, the Iowa Guard troops—like their grandfathers of World War One—were sent to Vietnam piecemeal, as replacement troops. Some members of the Guard, including Military Policemen, deployed to South Korea. At least three Sioux City Guard members were killed in action in Vietnam during the war.

=== 1971–1980 ===
==== Urban renewal ====
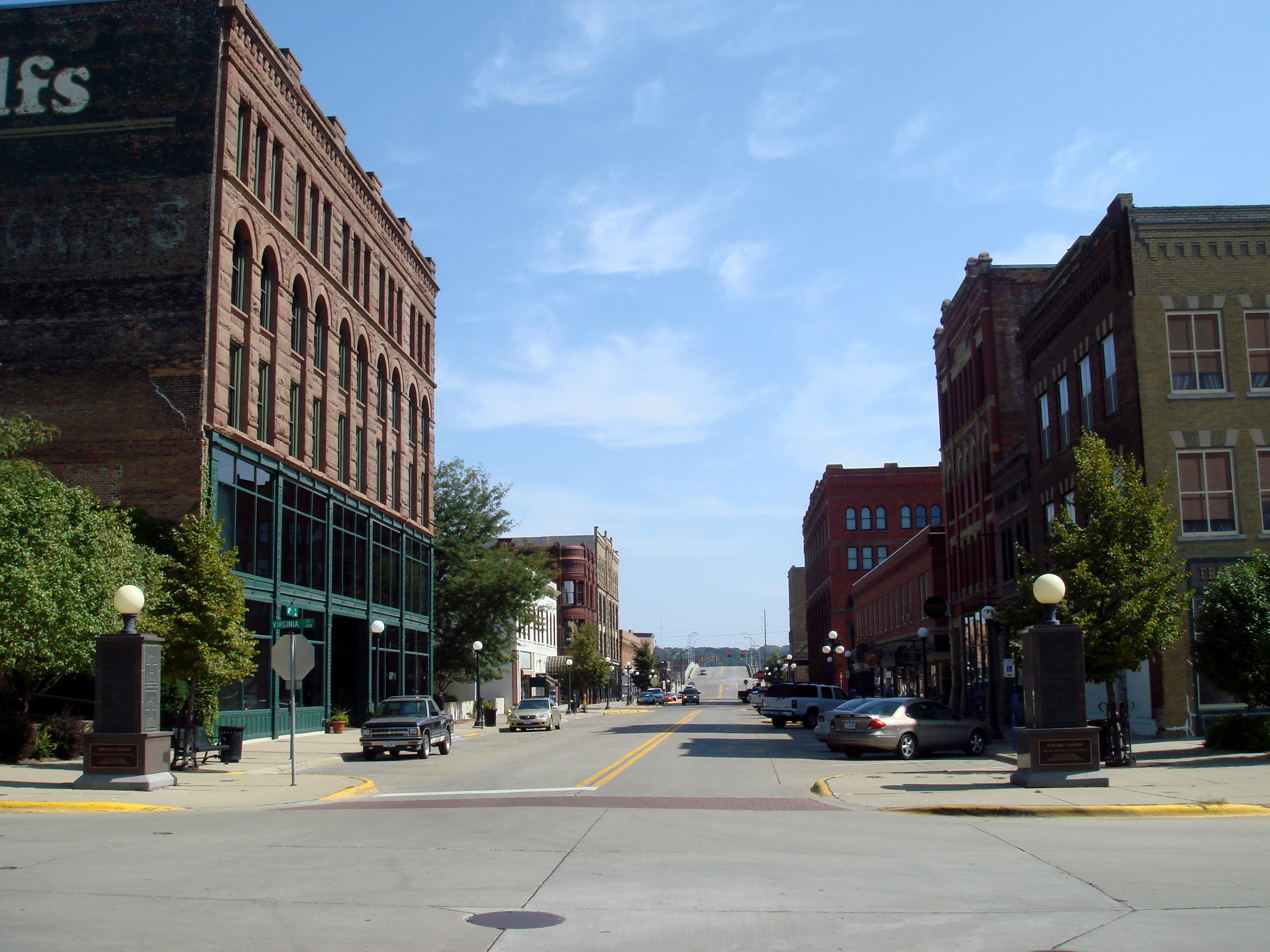
Historic Fourth Street, Downtown.

The 1970s witnessed a second, decade of urban renewal in downtown Sioux City. (see the "South Bottoms"). (See "Historic Fourth Street"). It took nearly another decade to rebuild the area. Many buildings were torn down, some dating back to the 1800s. Although there was some criticism of redevelopment, this was typical in many areas with urban renewal, losing old and sometimes historic buildings.

==== Labor unrest ====
Labor unrest erupted yet again in Sioux City in the early 1970s with a series of strikes by union meatcutters, laborers and allied trades against the Iowa Beef Processor (IBP) Dakota City, Nebraska plant. After years of fruitless negotiations, management finally locked out union laborers, erected a shanty town of cinderblock houses on the company compound and imported Mexican laborers. This act, and the concurrent departure of the Zenith TV manufacturing plant, served as a wake-up call to the Woodbury County Labor Council, which had wielded considerable political power in its defense of Sioux City's primarily blue-collar citizenry for generations. The streamlining of meat production processes—as pioneered by IBP Corporation—and the amalgamation of job tasks, revolutionized the industry in a way that would have major repercussions for Sioux City. Within 30 years, the meatpacking industry—the industry that virtually "built" Sioux City—would all but disappear within the boundaries of Sioux City, and along with it the once-dominant Sioux City Stockyards. "Clean" industries, including manufacturing of computers, would emerge to take its place. This not only changed the culture and attitudes of city residents but demographics as well. While this was a traumatic industrial transition, most residents would agree that the changes have been very healthy for a city that was once black-balled by business developers as a tough, strike-prone, unskilled blue collar, pro-labor town. This is not to denigrate the contributions of Labor, which won many basic working rights for all Americans in several landmark strikes in Sioux City in the first half of the 20th century. But the influx of multinational corporations like IBP, and the formation and rapid growth of Gateway Computer, brought about corporate business philosophies and global outlooks that have clearly transformed Sioux City into a cleaner and less violent city.

=== 1981–1990 ===
==== F4 tornado ====
On July 28, 1986, an F4 tornado struck areas just west and south of Sioux City, destroying one of the four power generation plants at Port Neal, six miles (10 km) south of the Sioux City airport. No one was killed and the tornado avoided heavily populated areas.

==== Flight 232 airline crash ====
On July 19, 1989, a Douglas DC-10 carrying United Airlines flight 232 crashed at the Sioux Gateway Airport killing 111 passengers and one flight attendant. But due to efforts by the pilot and his crew, 185 on board survived. The airport had a full-time Air National Guard base located on it that provided 'First Recovery' fire fighters and approx 200 air guardsmen to aid in the search for survivors in the fields of corn surrounding the main fuselage section of the aircraft. They were further aided by the advanced disaster training that the city had recently completed for its emergency workers. This event was memorialized in a made-for-TV movie "A Thousand Heroes - the Rescue of Flight 232" starring Charlton Heston as Captain Al Haynes in 1991.

==== All America City again ====
In 1990, due to its rescue efforts and compassion of its citizens in the Flight 232 disaster, Sioux City was again named an All America City by the National Civic League.

=== 1991–2000 ===
==== Explosion at Terra International ====
On December 13, 1994, an explosion killed four and injured 18 at the Terra International ammonium nitrate plant at Port Neal. The explosion released a cloud of anhydrous ammonia into the air and leaked nitric acid into the ground. The incident forced emergency evacuations in nearby areas such as Salix. The toxic cloud stayed south of Sioux City.

== 21st century ==
The urban renewal of downtown during the 1970s has lost much of its impact due to suburban development, including the Southern Hills Mall. Department store J. C. Penney, moved from their downtown location in Sioux City, which opened in 1975 moved into Target's former location in 2004. The Sioux City Public Museum is renovating the building, moving from the undersized historic Pierce Mansion. In 2007, another department store, Younkers closed their location in downtown Sioux City, only choosing to operate in Southern Hills Mall. HOM Furniture has moved into this space from a much smaller store in Sioux City.

Redevelopment has occurred in downtown Sioux City with the restoration of The Orpheum Theatre, which had been simply used as a movie theatre since the 1960s, until funding to restore it began in the mid-1990s. Tyson Events Center opened in 2003, replacing the 53-year-old Sioux City Municipal Auditorium, which is now a recreation center. In 2004, a 14 screen movie theatre opened, and included 12,000 square feet (1,100 m^{2}) of retail space. The movie theatre has been profitable, however the retail space is almost completely vacant, and the building could face foreclosure.

In 2005, Sioux City, along with Coon Rapids and Clinton, was awarded one of the inaugural Iowa Great Places designations. One of the major events that occurred in Sioux City in the 2010s was the addition of the Hard Rock Hotel and Casino which attracts a lot of big acts and is a main feature of the Sioux City area for the present time.
