= 2020–21 NCAA Division II men's ice hockey season =

- Duration: February 5, 2021– March 14, 2021
- NCAA tournament: 2021

The 2020–21 NCAA Division II men's ice hockey season began on February 5, 2021 and concluded on March 14, 2021. This was the 39th season of second-tier college ice hockey.

== Regular season ==
Due to COVID-19 concerns, the Northeast-10 Conference announced in July that all league activities would be suspended through the end of the 2020 calendar year. As all Division II programs played in the Northeast-10, this put the entire D-II season in jeopardy. Eventually all of the schools decided to cancel their seasons except for one. Franklin Pierce soldiered on by themselves, playing just six games against three opponents (all Division III).

=== Standings ===
2020–21 Northeast-10 Conference ice hockey standings
	Conference							Overall					
	GP	W	L	T	PTS	GF	GA	GP	W	L	T	GF	GA
Assumption	0	0	0	0	-	0	0	0	0	0	0	0	0
Franklin Pierce	0	0	0	0	-	0	0	6	1	5	0	17	30
Post	0	0	0	0	-	0	0	0	0	0	0	0	0
Saint Anselm	0	0	0	0	-	0	0	0	0	0	0	0	0
Saint Michael's	0	0	0	0	-	0	0	0	0	0	0	0	0
Southern New Hampshire	0	0	0	0	-	0	0	0	0	0	0	0	0
Stonehill	0	0	0	0	-	0	0	0	0	0	0	0	0
Championship: Cancelled † indicates conference regular season champion * indicates conference tournament champions

== See also ==
- 2020–21 NCAA Division I men's ice hockey season
- 2020–21 NCAA Division III men's ice hockey season
