= Hobbs Municipal Ice Center =

Indoor ice arena in Wisconsin

Hobbs Municipal Ice Arena
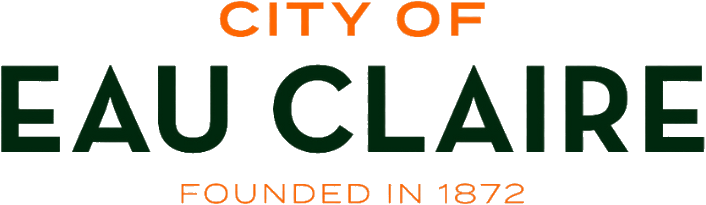

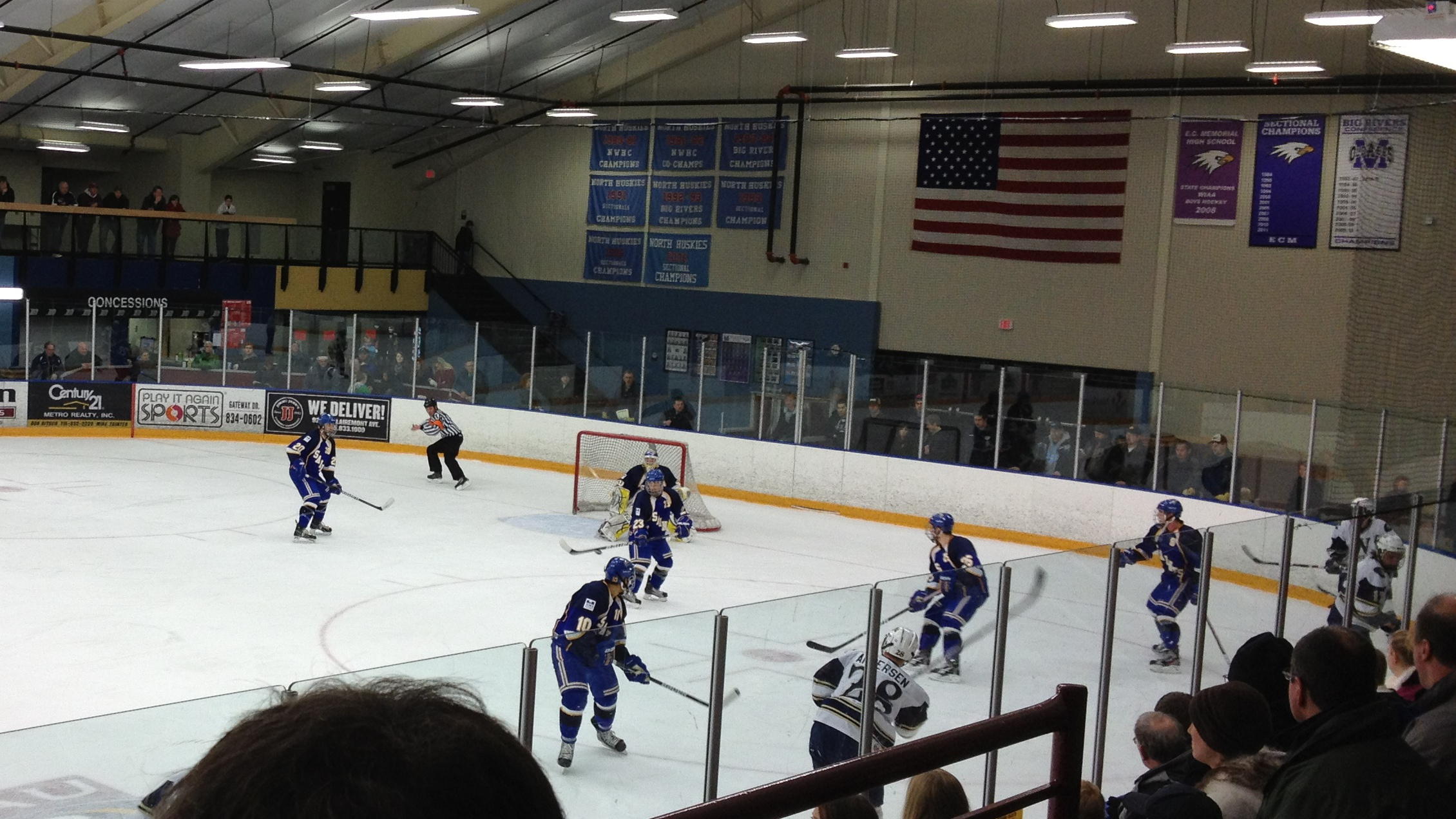
- College of St. Scholastica vs. Wisconsin–Eau Claire hockey game in 2012
- Interactive map of Hobbs Municipal Ice Arena
- Address: 915 Menomonie Street; Eau Claire, WI; United States
- Coordinates: 44.80056°N 91.51883°W
- Owner: City of Eau Claire
- Operator: City of Eau Claire
- Type: Ice hockey arena
- Current use: Ice hockey
- Public transit: ECT: 2 7

Construction
- Opened: 1975; 51 years ago

Tenants
- UW-Eau Claire Blugolds (WIAC); Eau Claire Memorial High School; Eau Claire North High School

Website
- eauclairewi.gov/hobbs-ice-arena

Hobbs Municipal Ice Center is an Ice hockey arena located in Eau Claire, Wisconsin. The arena is home to the UW–Eau Claire Blugolds men's and women's varsity hockey teams, in addition to the and men's club hockey team. The venue also hosts local high school teams. Hobbs Ice Center provides three ice rinks, locker rooms, meeting rooms and offices for the Eau Claire Parks, Recreation & Forestry Department.

The Hobbs Municipal Ice Center was built in 1974 with an initial donation from the Hobbs Foundation. A $5.6 million renovation was completed in early-2010, adding additional office space, a third rink, additional seats, a training room, new lighting, and more.

The Eau Claire Figure Skating Club and the Eau Claire Youth Hockey Association also use the arena.

The main rink is the Richard O'Brien Rink, named in honor of Richard O'Brien, who was the driving force behind the community effort that led to the construction of the ice center in 1975.
