= Eau Claire Transit =

Mass transit operator in Eau Claire County, Wisconsin

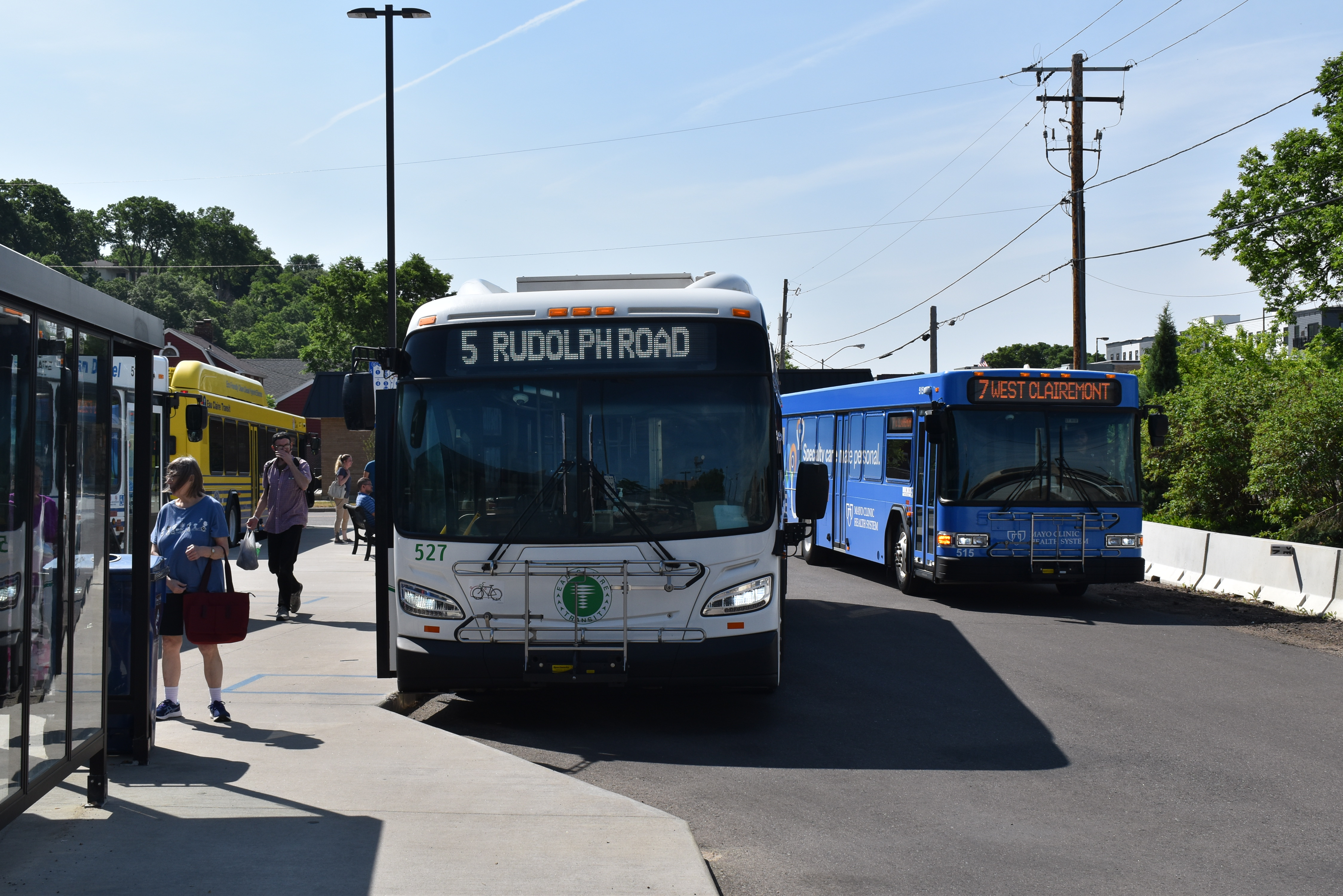
- Eau Claire Transit buses at the temporary transit center in June 2023
- Parent: City of Eau Claire
- Headquarters: 910 Forest Street
- Locale: Eau Claire, Wisconsin
- Service area: Eau Claire County
- Service type: Bus service, paratransit (contracted)
- Routes: 22 (incl. non-core)
- Hubs: Eau Claire Transit Center, Centennial Hall, Davies Center
- Fleet: 21
- Annual ridership: 725,458 (2024)
- Fuel type: Clean diesel, hybrid diesel-electric
- Transit Manager: Katrina Running
- Website: ecbus.org

Eau Claire Transit is a public transportation provider in the Eau Claire, Wisconsin metropolitan area. At present, the system consists of sixteen core routes and primarily serves the cities of Eau Claire and Altoona. Service frequency varies from thirty minutes to one hour depending on the route and time of day. There is no service on Sundays or Saturday evenings.

== History ==
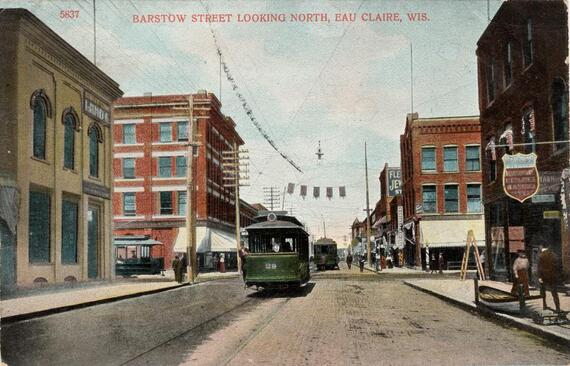
Trolleys on Barstow Street in Eau Claire (1907)

The history of transit in the city began in 1879 when the first horse-drawn trolleys operated by the Eau Claire City Railway Co. began service. Eau Claire was the third city in Wisconsin to adopt the method of transport. The city was also one of the first in the United States to adopt the use of electric-powered trolleys in the 1880s and the first in the country to heat trolley cars using electricity, a development influenced by the state's climate. Services eventually expanded beyond the city into a regional interurban network, reaching Irvine Park in Chippewa Falls in the late 1890s and extending east to Altoona by 1915.

However, the system started to decline by the mid-1920s, and the first buses started replacing the streetcar lines in 1930. Three years later, buses had completely replaced the trolley network, and the rail lines were abandoned. This transition was an early example of what would become a broader trend across the nation, where buses were viewed as a more financially prudent option compared to the fixed routes and infrastructure required for trolleys. Near the end of the decade, due to financial difficulties, the city sold the network to a local investor, and it was operated as the Eau Claire Transportation Co. The company would continue to run the region's transit system for the next several decades until the mid-1970s, when it was sold back to the city and renamed Eau Claire Transit.

In 1985, the city built a transit center in the downtown area, which was intended to be a temporary location until a permanent transit center could be constructed. The temporary center lasted for over 36 years. In the fall of 2021, construction of a new mixed-use transit center, later named Alto Station, began on the same site as the temporary 1985 facility. The transit portion of the project opened in September 2025 after numerous construction delays.

== Governance ==
Eau Claire Transit (ECT) is a division of the city's Community Services Department and is governed by a nine-member transit commission appointed by the City Council. The commission comprises six citizens, one council member, one Altoona resident, and one University of Wisconsin–Eau Claire (UWEC) representative. Responsibility for transit planning and regular service decisions rests primarily with the transit commission. The Council retains final approval over changes with significant budgetary impacts, but does not generally manage transit operations. ECT is not part of a regional transit authority or similar body following the repeal of state laws permitting such entities and operates as a municipal department. Regional planning organizations in the area function in an advisory and coordination capacity, assisting with urban planning, but lack the independent authority to raise funds or implement services. The City of Altoona funds service within its limits through a directly negotiated agreement with Eau Claire.

== Operations ==
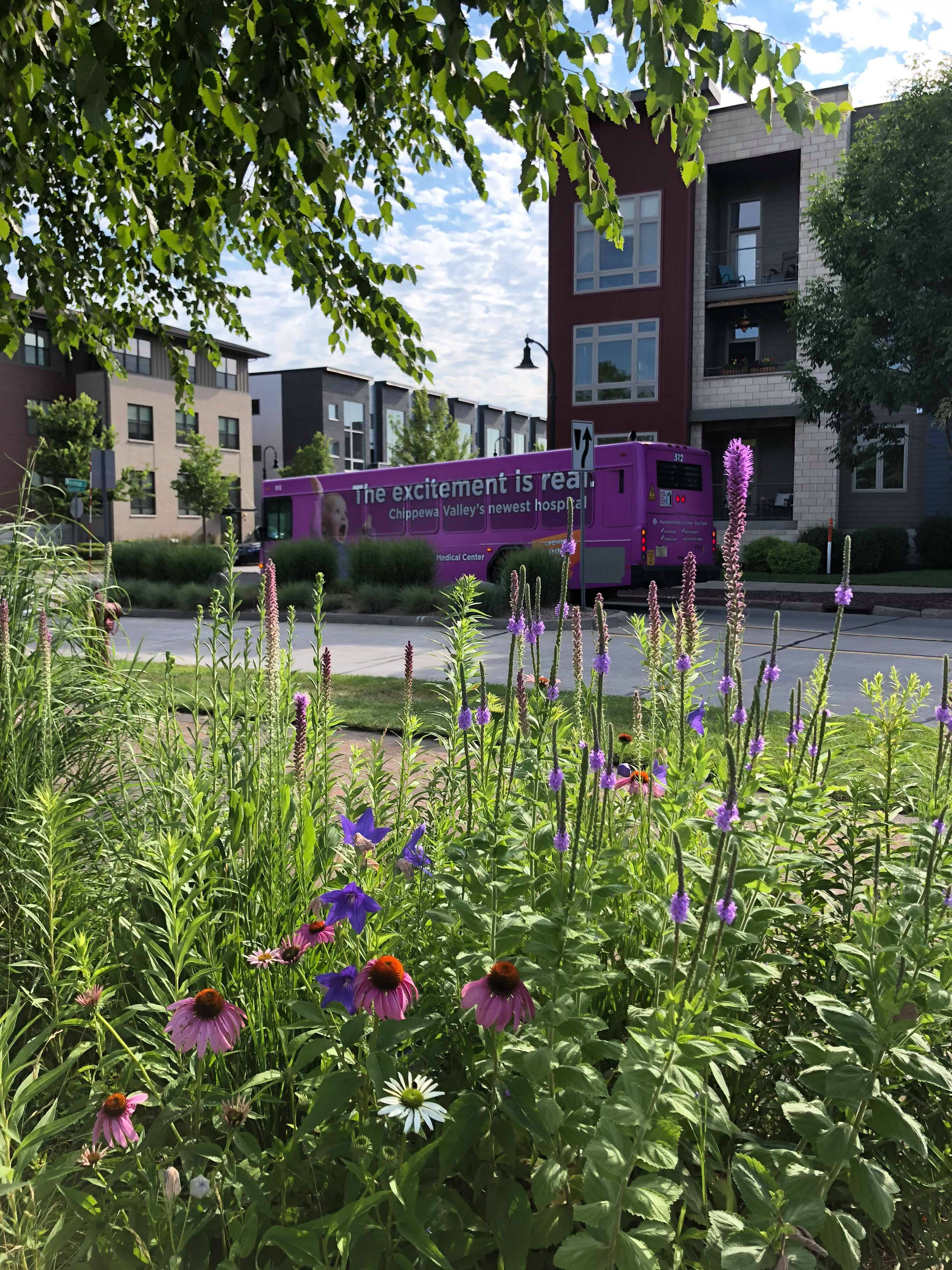
An Eau Claire Transit bus in Phoenix Park

The Eau Claire Transit Center, located in the downtown area, is the beginning and end point for most fixed-route services. Routes directly serving the University of Wisconsin–Eau Claire are the only lines that do not utilize the Transit Center for layovers. ECT operates a fleet of roughly 21 buses and serves a population of over 82,600 across its direct service area.

=== Core routes ===
One of the main features of the core network is the interlining of routes, which means that the same bus can serve different routes at different times. For instance, the bus that runs on route 2 becomes route 12 (and vice versa) after stopping at the Transit Center on a half-hourly interval. Similarly, routes 5 and 15 share the same bus, as well as several other route pairs. Longer routes with lower frequencies generally do not interline and lay over at the Transit Center once per hour.

No.	Route name	Major streets (Note: Sections of roads with more than two concurrent routes near the downtown area are generally omitted for conciseness.)	Notes
1	Margaret and Mall	Margaret St, Rudolph Rd, Fairfax St, London Rd, E. Hamilton Ave, Commonwealth Ave, Gateway Dr	
2	Mt. Washington	Water St, Menomonie St, Ferry St, Crescent Ave	
3	North High	Putnam St, Birch St, Starr Ave, Western Ave, Runway Ave, Eddy Ln, Piedmont Rd	Airport service, weekdays only
4	Locust Lane	Forest St, Birch St, River Prairie Dr, Seymour Rd, Abby Hill Dr, Locust Ln	Weekdays only
3/4	North High - Locust Lane	Forest St, Birch St, Starr Ave, Western Ave, Eddy Ln, Runway Ave, Locust Ln, Abby Hill Dr	Evenings and Saturdays only
5	Rudolph Rd	Harding Ave, Rudolph Rd, Golf Rd, London Rd	
6	Putnam Heights and Mall	E. Hamilton Ave, Fairfax St, Golf Rd, Bullis Farm Rd, Keystone Xing, London Rd, Skeels Ave	No evening service
7	West Clairemont	W. Clairemont Ave, Oak Ridge Dr, Craig Rd, Menomonie St, Water St	Limited evening service
8	Folsom and Vine	Madison St, 3rd St, Truax Blvd, Folsom St, Moholt Dr, Vine St, Oxford Ave	
12	Delong	Oxford Ave, Madison St, Vine St, Cameron St, Whipple St, 5th Ave	
15	West MacArthur	W. MacArthur Ave, Stein Blvd, Eldorado Blvd, W. Hamilton Ave	
17	Altoona	Galloway St, River Prairie Dr, Oak Leaf Way, 10th St, Division St, Spooner Ave	No evening service
18	Memorial High	Highland Ave, Fenwick Ave, Fairfax St, E. Clairemont Ave, Keith St, Brackett Ave	
20	Westridge Center	Madison St, Cameron St, Vine St, Folsom St, Moholt Dr, Whipple St, 5th Ave	No evening service
21	Shopko Plaza	W. MacArthur Ave, Craig Rd, International Dr, Sky Park Blvd, W. Hamilton Ave	No evening service

=== University of Wisconsin–Eau Claire routes ===
The routes serving the UWEC campus area are primarily funded and designed by the university. Buses serving the campus lay over in front of the Davies Center or Centennial Hall every 15–45 minutes, rather than at the Transit Center. Route 9 does stop briefly at the Transit Center to enable direct transfers with the main network. These routes do not run during summer recess and have reduced service during winter break; there is no service on weekends or holidays. All Eau Claire Transit bus routes are free to UWEC students and faculty:

- 9 UWEC Lower Campus (Water St, 5th Ave, EC Transit Center, Downtown, Pablo Center, and Sonnentag Center)
- 19 UWEC Upper Campus (Stein Blvd, various student housing, CVTC, Bollinger Fields, and Sonnentag Center)

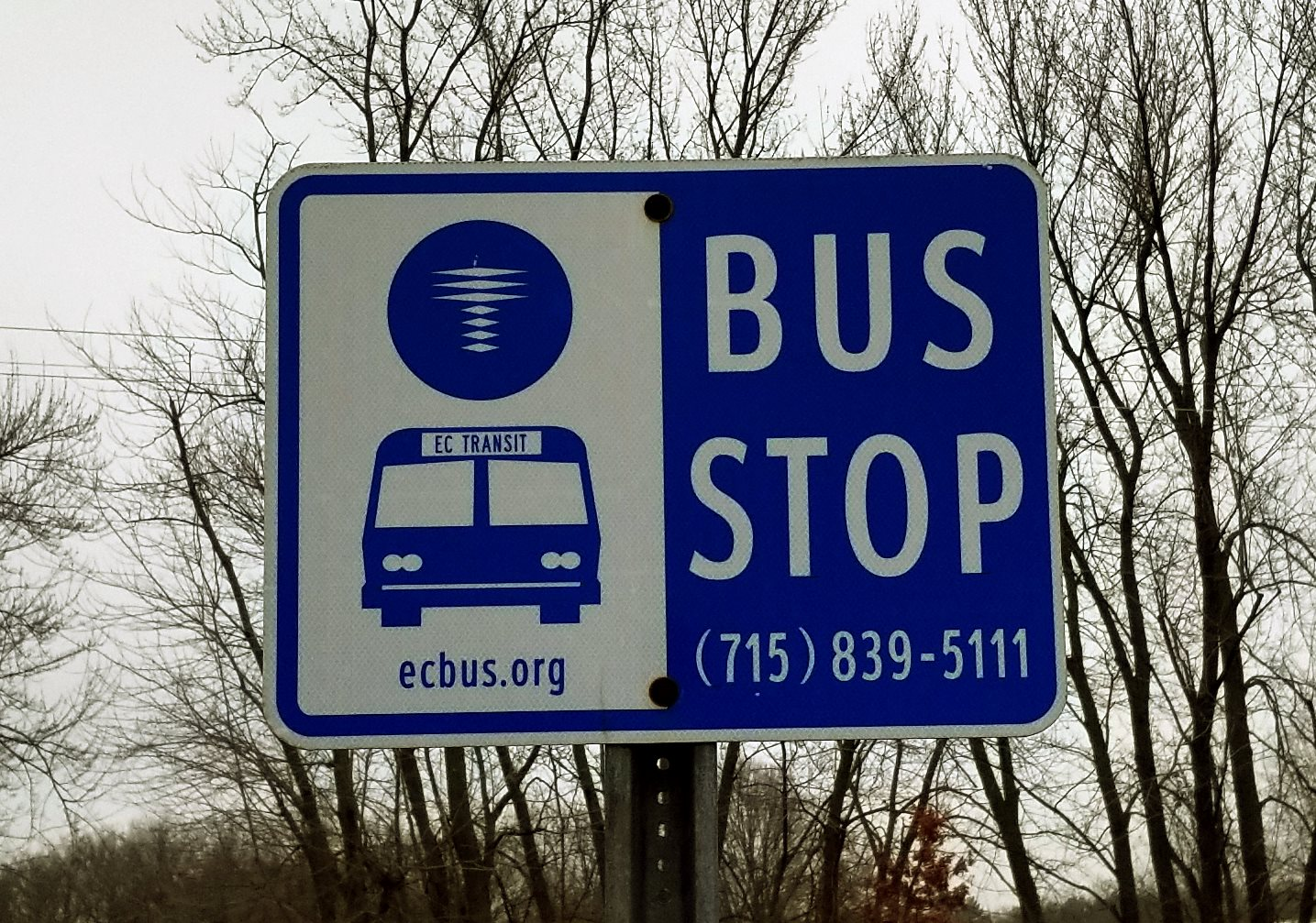
ECT bus stop sign

=== Express routes ===
The agency operates two express routes that offer limited service on days when the Eau Claire Area School District (ECASD) is in session. These routes also provide commuter service to other public entities. Students residing in the Altoona School District or ECASD can ride fare-free on all bus routes.

- Husky Express (Career Development Center, North High School)
- Knight Express (Mayo Clinic-Luther Hospital, Eau Claire Job Center, Delong Middle School)

Eau Claire Transit also partners with various community groups to provide two free "Pool Express" routes on weekday afternoons during ECASD summer break.

In early 2026, a short express service was introduced on a trial basis aimed at improving access between downtown community resources. Branded "DRC Express", it operates from Seaver Street to Gibson Street via the Transit Center, with a return trip in the evening.

=== Paratransit ===
The City of Eau Claire contracts paratransit services through a local provider, serving eligible residents within the ECT service area and rural Eau Claire County via a joint city-county arrangement. Rides are typically scheduled in advance and run concurrently with fixed-route operations.

=== Northern Lite ===
Northern Lite was an on demand microtransit pilot project focused on Eau Claire's northeast side, which launched in July 2025. It operated during the agency's weekday core route hours, with trips outside the coverage area requiring a transfer at the Transit Center. The service was operated under contract by Via Transportation and funded through American Rescue Plan Act (ARPA) grants. Services were discontinued on July 3, 2026, due to the scheduled end of pilot program funding.

== Alto Station ==
Until 2021, Eau Claire Transit had been operating out of a 1985 transit center, which had been planned as a temporary location until a permanent transit center could be built. However, this arrangement lasted for 36 years. In 2018, the city was awarded a $5 million Transportation Investment Generating Economic Recovery (TIGER) grant for the project from the US Department of Transportation.

Alto Station began construction on September 17, 2021, on the same site as the temporary facility. To provide a transfer point during construction, a temporary facility was established at South Farwell Street and Gray Street, just east of the site, in a surface parking lot. The temporary facility opened earlier that month and was originally scheduled to be in use until 2023 but remained active until late 2025. The new transit center features public restrooms, a climate-controlled lobby, a staffed ticket kiosk and offices for transit staff and LEOs. Above the center, a mixed-use development incorporates a public parking ramp and residential units. Around 40 of the 88 units are classified as workforce housing, meaning they are considered affordable for those making between 80%–100% of the median income in the county. Due to changes in development management, they remain below the area median income, though they are not eligible for subsidies.

Due to the high construction costs in 2021 and 2022, the city contributed over $9 million to the project instead of the original $1.25 million. An estimate from 2019 valued the project at $23.5 million. The transit component of the project was scheduled to be completed in early 2023; however, due to funding and construction delays, it was not finished until late September 2025. In June 2026, the developer stated that construction of the non-transit portions of the project remained ongoing due to design revisions and continued supply chain issues. It also stated that the project's general contractor had been replaced, and disputed liens filed by several subcontractors over the previous year.

== Ridership ==
Year	Ridership	Change over previous year
2014	1,043,917	▼2.63%
2015	940,074	▼9.95%
2016	937,560	▼0.27%
2017	928,515	▼0.96%
2018	964,748	▲3.9%
2019	913,567	▼5.31%
2020	458,780	▼49.78%
2021	458,980	▲0.04%
2022	586,437	▲27.77%
2023	672,882	▲14.74%
2024	725,458	▲7.81%

== See also ==
- La Crosse MTU
- Dunn County Transit
- Metro Transit
