= Ryan Gill =

Ryan Gill is a state legislator and cattle rancher in Florida. He is a Republican. He represents District 67.

He has chaired a soil and water conservation district.

He succeeded Lawrence McClure in the Florida House.
