= Irvine Park (Chippewa Falls, Wisconsin) =

Park and Zoo in Chippewa Falls, Wisconsin

- Interactive map of Irvine Park
- Type: Municipal park
- Location: Chippewa Falls, Wisconsin
- Coordinates: 44.9535°N 91.4006°W
- Area: 318 acres (129 ha)

Irvine Park is a city park located in Chippewa Falls, Wisconsin. Founded in 1906 by William Irvine, it covers 318 acres (129 ha) including a zoo, started in 1909 as a bear pen, and museum.
