= Wisconsin–Eau Claire Blugolds =

Sports program of University of Wisconsin–Eau Claire

- University: University of Wisconsin–Eau Claire
- Nickname: Blugolds
- NCAA: Division III
- Conference: WIAC
- Location: Eau Claire, Wisconsin
- Football stadium: Carson Park
- Basketball arena: Sonnentag Event Center
- Ice hockey arena: Hobbs Municipal Ice Center
- Softball stadium: Sonnentag Fieldhouse
- Soccer stadium: Simpson Field
- Aquatics center: McPhee Center Pool
- Lacrosse stadium: Sonnentag Fieldhouse
- Golf course: Whitetail Golf Course; Wild Ridge Golf Course
- Tennis venue: John & Fay Menard Tennis Center
- Volleyball arena: Sonnentag Event Center
- Colors: Blue and gold
- Website: blugolds.com

Team NCAA championships
- 11

The University of Wisconsin–Eau Claire Blugolds (casually known as the UW-Eau Claire Blugolds) are the athletic teams of the University of Wisconsin–Eau Claire. The Blugolds athletic teams compete in NCAA Division III.

== Varsity sports ==
Men's sports	Women's sports
Baseball	Basketball
Basketball	Cross country
Cross country	Golf
Football	Gymnastics
Golf	Ice hockey
Ice hockey	Lacrosse
Soccer	Soccer
Swimming	Softball
Tennis	Swimming
Track and field^{1}	Tennis
Wrestling	Track and field^{1}
	Volleyball
^{1} – includes both indoor and outdoor

=== Cross country ===
The Blugolds have been national champions in cross country (1984, 2009, 2015).

=== Football ===
The Blugolds Have won ten conference titles.

=== Ice hockey ===
The Blugolds have been national champions in Ice Hockey (1984, 2013).

== Facilities ==
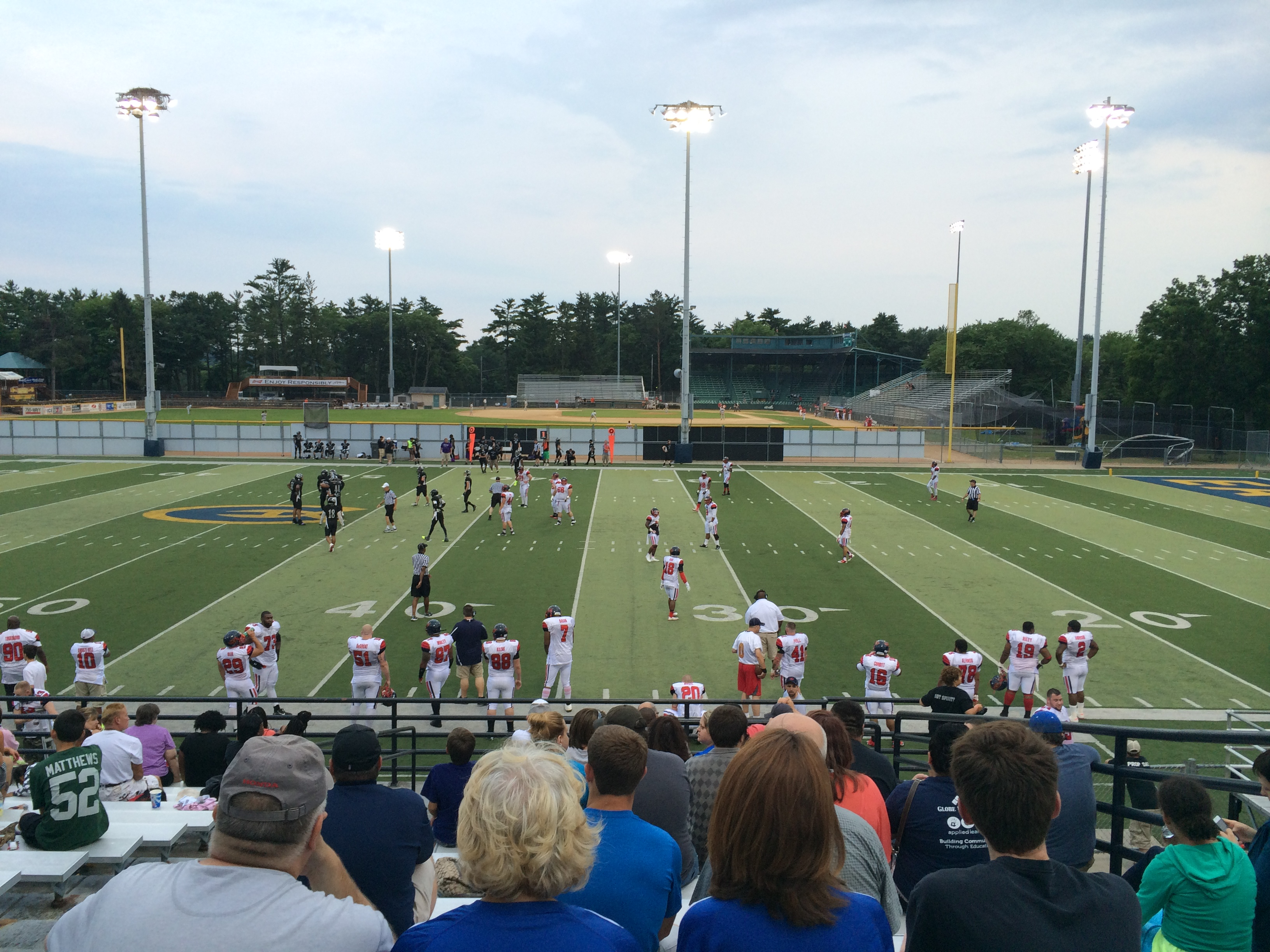
Carson Park (football)

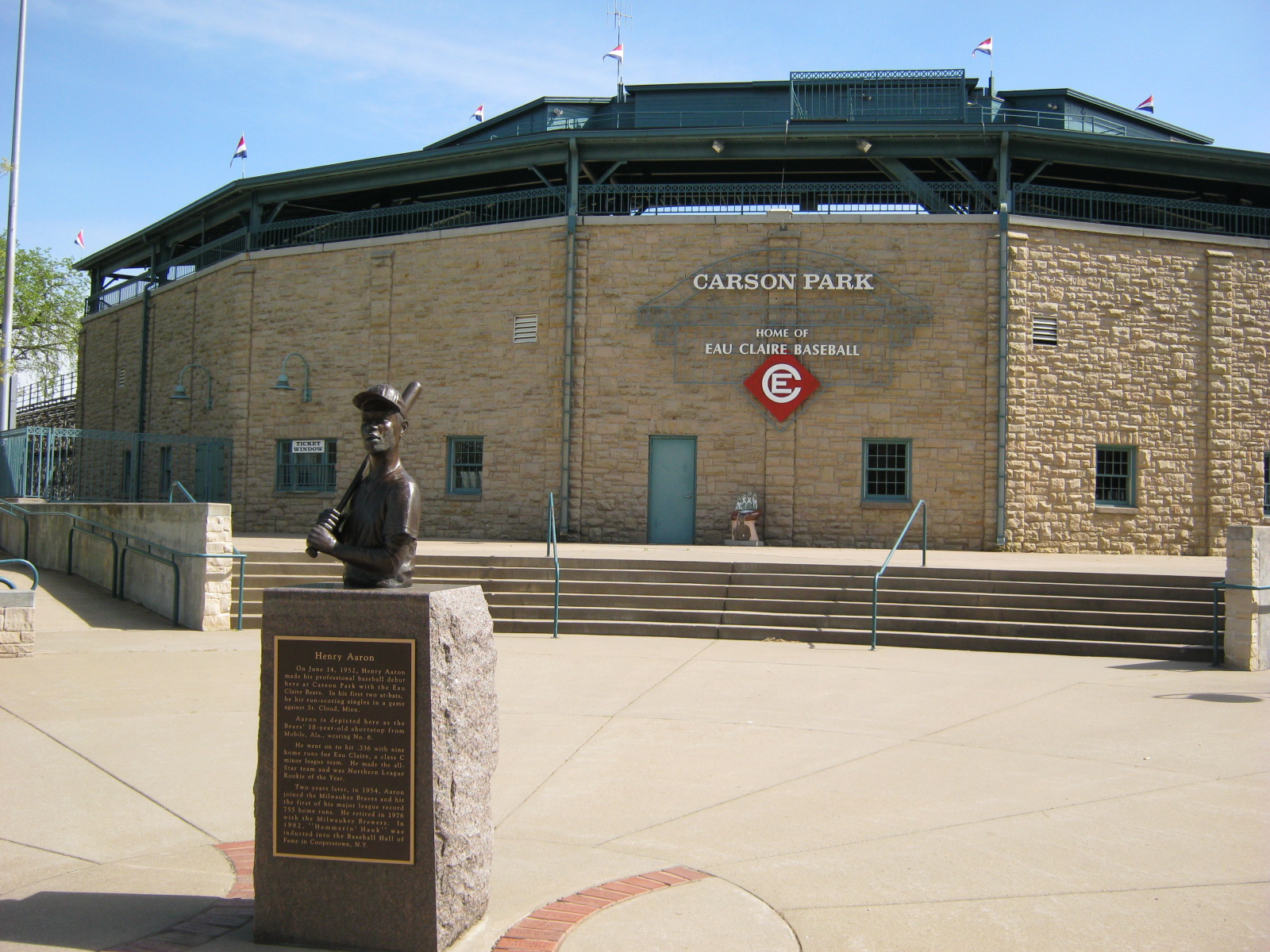
Carson Park (baseball)

Venue	Sport(s)	Ref.
Carson Park (football) (Note: Not owned by the university but by the city of Eau Claire.)	Football	
Carson Park (baseball)	Baseball	
Sonnentag Event Center (Note: Not owned by the university.)	Basketball; Volleyball	
Simpson Field	Soccer; Track and field	
	Lacrosse; Softball	
Hobbs Municipal Ice Center	Ice hockey	
McPhee Physical Education Center	Volleyball; Wrestling; Gymnastics	
John & Fay Menard Center	Tennis	
McPhee Center Pool	Swimming	
Whitetail Course	Golf	
Wild Ridge Golf Course	Golf	

=== Former facilities ===
Venue	Sport(s)
W. L. Zorn Arena	Basketball; Volleyball

== National championships ==
=== Team ===
Sport	Titles	Assoc.	Division	Year	Rival	Score
Cross country (men's)	1	NCAA	Division III	2015	Williams	135–144
Cross country (women's)	1	NCAA	Division III	2009	St. Lawrence	171–180 (-9)
Softball	1	NCAA	Division III	2018	Wisconsin–Whitewater	4–3 (9 inn.)
Swimming (women's)	3	NAIA	Single	1983	Pacific Lutheran	406–387
Swimming (women's)	3	NAIA	Single	1986	Central Washington	538–497
Swimming (women's)	3	NAIA	Single	1987	Puget Sound	472–456
Track and field (men's)	3	NCAA	Division III	2015	Wisconsin–La Crosse	62–60
Track and field (men's)	3	NCAA	Division III	2016	Wisconsin–La Crosse	53–49
Track and field (men's)	3	NCAA	Division III	2022*	Williams	35–32
Volleyball (women's)	1	NCAA	Division III	2021	Calvin	3–0

- Asterisk indicates a shared national championship

== Notable athletes ==
- Roman Brumm, NFL player
- Ryan Brunt, curling athlete
- Kevin Fitzgerald, NFL player
- Alex Hicks, NHL player
- Paul Menard, NASCAR driver
- Mike Ratliff, NBA player
- Frank Schade, NBA player
- Lee Weigel, NFL player
- Reed Zuehlke, Olympic athlete
