= Peter Roundy =

Current position
- Title: Head coach
- Team: Curry
- Conference: CNE

Biographical details
- Born: August 16, 1986 (age 40); Simsbury, Connecticut, USA
- Education: Stonehill College (BA 2010); Trinity College (MA 2013)

Playing career
- 2006–2010: Stonehill
- Position: Left Wing

Coaching career (HC unless noted)
- 2010–2011: Becker (asst.)
- 2011–2015: Trinity (asst.)
- 2015–2021: Holy Cross (asst.)
- 2021–Present: Curry

Head coaching record
- Overall: 84–25–4 (.761)
- Tournaments: 3–3 (.500)

Accomplishments and honors

Championships
- 2015 National Championship (asst.)

Awards
- 2025 Edward Jeremiah Award

Peter Roundy is an American ice hockey coach and former left wing. He is currently in charge of the men's program at Curry and was named as the national coach of the year in 2025.

== Career ==
After graduating from Kimball Union Academy in 2006, Roundy attended Stonehill and spent 4 years as a member of the ice hockey team. During his freshman year, Roundy helped the Skyhawks win the ECAC Division II tournament, earning the club a de facto Division II championship. He earned a B. A. in health care administration in 2010 and began his coaching career as an assistant at Becker. After a year, he enrolled as a graduate student at Trinity College and, while continuing his education, also served as an assistant coach for the ice hockey team. After graduating with a M. A. in public policy studies, Roundy remained at the college as an assistant for another two years. During his tenure, the hockey program saw rapid improvement going from a losing record in 2012 to winning the National Championship in 2015.

With a title now on his coaching resume, Roundy was hired onto the staff of David Berard at Holy Cross. He was tasked with recruiting players to help rebuild the program. After the Crusaders posted a winning season in his first year, the team slowly declined over the next four years. During the COVID-19 in 2021, the club finished with an abysmal record, their worst in almost 50 years.

Roundy returned to Division III when he was hired to take over from T. J. Manastersky at Curry the following year. The Colonels had been a good team in recent years, routinely finishing with winning records but they had been unable to make an NCAA tournament appearance in over a decade. Roundy continued the winning ways in his first year behind the bench and then led the club to a 20-win campaign the following season. While it wasn't enough for Curry to win its league championship, the Colonels finished high enough in the national ranking to earn an at-large bid and appear in the national tournament. The next year, the program got its first regular season title since 2011 and, while they again failed to capture a conference championship, they were again an at-large entry into the NCAA tournament. In 2025, behind a brilliant goaltending performance from Shane Soderwall, Curry won both the regular season and tournament championship for the Conference of New England. Beyond receiving an automatic bid, Curry also finished as the #1 ranked team in the nation, a first for the program in 51 years of existence. Curry received a bye into the quarterfinal round and won its first playoff game to reach the Frozen Four for the first time. Unfortunately, the team lost in overtime in the semifinal match and saw its chance for a championship slip away. Curry finished 1 win shy of tying the program record and, despite the finish, Roundy was named as the Division III national coach of the year.

== Career statistics ==
			Regular season					Playoffs
Season	Team	League	GP	G	A	Pts	PIM	GP	G	A	Pts	PIM
2006–07	Stonehill	ECAC Northeast	27	6	17	23	17	—	—	—	—	—
2007–08	Stonehill	ECAC Northeast	22	4	13	17	6	—	—	—	—	—
2008–09	Stonehill	ECAC Northeast	24	8	14	22	4	—	—	—	—	—
2009–10	Stonehill	Northeast-10	27	10	19	29	8	—	—	—	—	—
NCAA totals			101	28	63	91	35	—	—	—	—	—

== College head coaching record ==
Record table
Season	Team	Overall	Conference	Standing	Postseason
Curry Colonels (CCC) (2021–2024)
2021–22	Curry	16–9–2	13–7–1	4th	CCC Semifinals
2022–23	Curry	22–6–1	16–4–1	2nd	NCAA National Quarterfinals
2023–24	Curry	21–6–1	15–3–0	1st	NCAA National Quarterfinals
Curry Colonels (CNE) (2024–present)
2024–25	Curry	25–4–0	16–2–0	1st	NCAA National Semifinals
Curry:		84–25–4 (.761)	60–16–2 (.782)		
Total:		84–25–4 (.761)			
National champion Postseason invitational champion Conference regular season champion Conference regular season and conference tournament champion Division regular season champion Division regular season and conference tournament champion Conference tournament champion

Awards and achievements
Preceded by Mark Taylor	Edward Jeremiah Award; 2024–25	Succeeded by Incumbent
