= Ben Guité =

Canadian ice hockey player (born 1978)

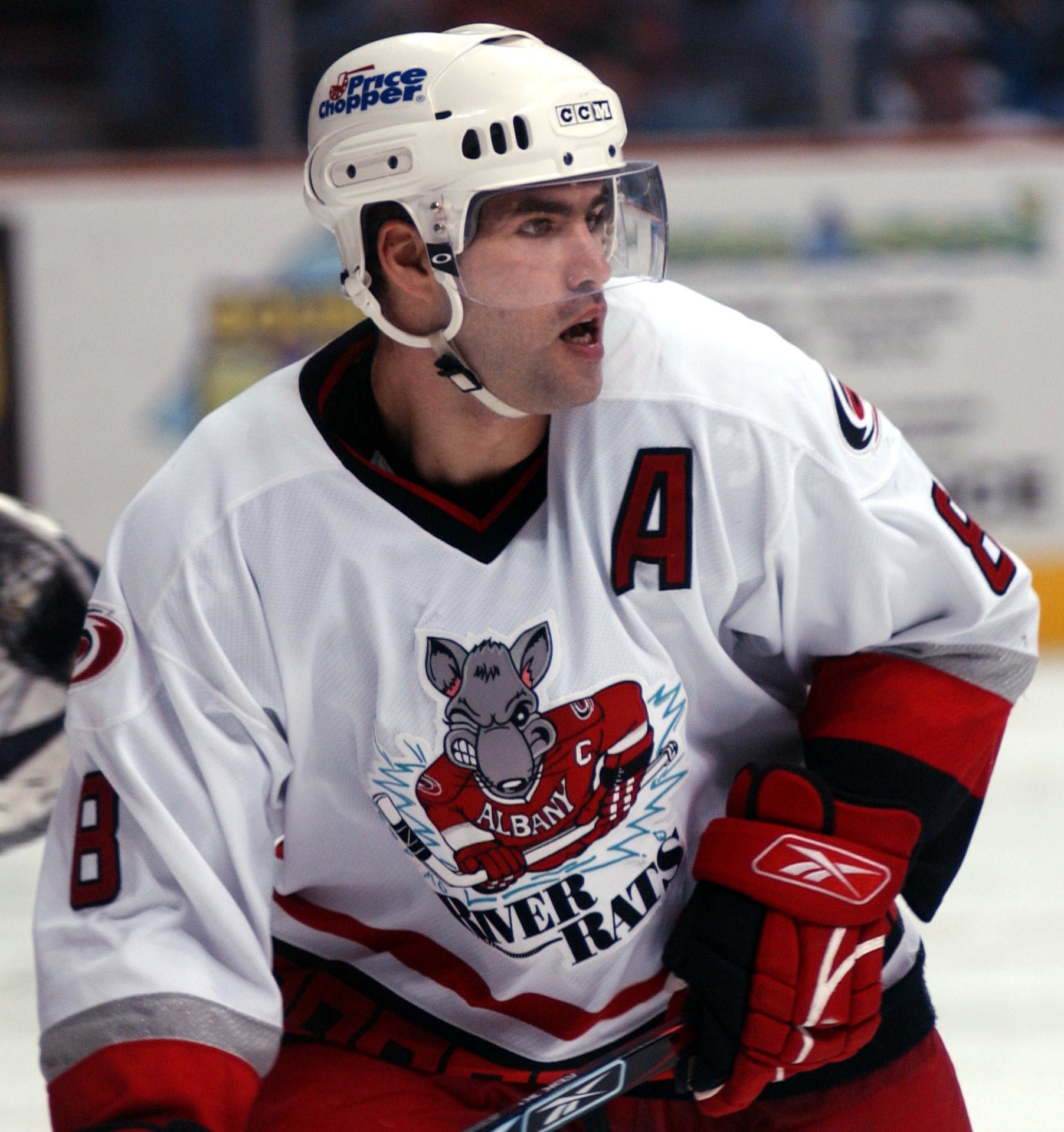
- Guité with the Albany River Rats in 2006
- Born: July 17, 1978 (age 48) Montreal, Quebec, Canada
- Height: 6 ft 1 in (185 cm)
- Weight: 211 lb (96 kg; 15 st 1 lb)
- Position: Centre
- Shot: Right
- Played for: Boston Bruins; Colorado Avalanche; Nashville Predators; Val Pusteria Wolves
- NHL draft: 172nd overall, 1997; Montreal Canadiens
- Playing career: 2000–2013 Coaching career

Current position
- Title: Head coach
- Team: Bowdoin

Biographical details
- Education: University of Maine

Coaching career (HC unless noted)
- 2013–2021: Maine (asst.)
- 2021–2022: Maine Mariners
- 2022–Present: Bowdoin

Benjamin Pierre Guité (born July 17, 1978) is a Canadian ice hockey coach and former professional forward. Guité played 13 seasons of professional hockey, most notably in the National Hockey League with the Boston Bruins, Colorado Avalanche, and the Nashville Predators. He is the son of former World Hockey Association player Pierre Guité.

After his playing career, he began coaching. In 2021 he was the head coach of the Maine Mariners in the ECHL. As of July 2022, he is the head coach of the Bowdoin College Men's hockey team.

== Playing career ==
As a youth, Guité played in the 1992 Quebec International Pee-Wee Hockey Tournament with a minor ice hockey team from the Lac-Saint-Louis area of Montreal.

Guité was drafted 172nd overall in the 1997 NHL entry draft by the Montreal Canadiens. Guité played junior hockey for the Capital District Selects of the Eastern Junior Hockey League, before continuing his career at the University of Maine in the Hockey East division. Unsigned, Guité made his professional debut in 2000 with the Tallahassee Tiger Sharks of the ECHL before signing with the New York Islanders as a free agent on August 1, 2001.

On March 19, 2002, while playing with the Bridgeport Sound Tigers of the American Hockey League (AHL), Guité was traded by the Islanders along with Bjorn Melin to the Mighty Ducks of Anaheim for Dave Roche. A year later Guité returned to Bridgeport signing as a free agent.

On August 15, 2005, Guité was signed by the Boston Bruins and played just a solitary game, his NHL debut, on January 30, 2006. After spending most of his time with the Providence Bruins in the 2005–06 season, Guité signed with the Colorado Avalanche on July 12, 2006.

Guité ended the 2006–07 season establishing a role as a defensive forward on the Avalanche, and re-signed for a further two seasons for the team.

In the 2007–08 season, his first full season in the NHL, Guité played 79 games, totaling 11 goals and 11 assists for 22 points. Guité also had his first 2-goal game in a 6-4 win over the St. Louis Blues on February 3, 2008.

On July 14, 2009 Guité signed a one-year, two-way contract with the Nashville Predators. He made his debut with Nashville on opening night for the 2009–10 season against the Dallas Stars on October 3, 2009. Guité played only four games with the Predators before he was reassigned to add a veteran presence to AHL affiliate, the Milwaukee Admirals, for the majority of the season.

After a single season with the Predators organization, Guité left as a free agent and signed a one-year contract with the Columbus Blue Jackets on August 18, 2010.

On July 7, 2011 Guité was signed by the San Jose Sharks on a one-year, two-way contract. Assigned to AHL affiliate, the Worcester Sharks, Guité's 2011–12 season was limited to 26 games due to concussion.

On October 10, 2012, with the NHL lockout impeding his options to sign a contract in North America, Guité signed on his first European venture to a one-year deal with Italian team HC Pustertal-Val Pusteria Wolves of the Serie A.

== Coaching career ==
On June 10, 2013, Guité began his first coaching stint as assistant coach for the University of Maine under first year head coach Red Gendron. Guité was promoted to associate head coach on October 14, 2014. From April 14 to May 12, 2021, Guité served as interim head coach of the Black Bears following the death of Gendron until the hiring of Ben Barr as head coach. Prior to the 2021–22 season, he was hired by the Maine Mariners of the ECHL as head coach. In July 2022, he was named head coach of the Bowdoin College Men's hockey team.

== Career statistics ==
			Regular season					Playoffs
Season	Team	League	GP	G	A	Pts	PIM	GP	G	A	Pts	PIM
1996–97	Maine	HE	34	7	7	14	21	—	—	—	—	—
1997–98	Maine	HE	32	6	12	18	20	—	—	—	—	—
1998–99	Maine	HE	40	12	16	28	30	—	—	—	—	—
1999–00	Maine	HE	40	22	14	36	36	—	—	—	—	—
2000–01	Tallahassee Tiger Sharks	ECHL	68	11	18	29	34	—	—	—	—	—
2001–02	Bridgeport Sound Tigers	AHL	68	12	18	30	39	—	—	—	—	—
2001–02	Cincinnati Mighty Ducks	AHL	10	2	5	7	4	3	0	0	0	2
2002–03	Cincinnati Mighty Ducks	AHL	80	13	16	29	44	—	—	—	—	—
2003–04	Bridgeport Sound Tigers	AHL	79	6	18	24	73	7	0	0	0	6
2004–05	Providence Bruins	AHL	77	9	15	24	69	17	3	4	7	34
2005–06	Providence Bruins	AHL	73	22	31	53	87	6	1	3	4	14
2005–06	Boston Bruins	NHL	1	0	0	0	0	—	—	—	—	—
2006–07	Albany River Rats	AHL	36	10	19	29	22	—	—	—	—	—
2006–07	Colorado Avalanche	NHL	39	3	8	11	16	—	—	—	—	—
2007–08	Colorado Avalanche	NHL	79	11	11	22	47	10	1	0	1	14
2008–09	Colorado Avalanche	NHL	50	5	7	12	30	—	—	—	—	—
2009–10	Nashville Predators	NHL	6	0	0	0	4	—	—	—	—	—
2009–10	Milwaukee Admirals	AHL	64	8	13	21	56	7	3	1	4	6
2010–11	Springfield Falcons	AHL	72	17	30	47	91	—	—	—	—	—
2011–12	Worcester Sharks	AHL	26	4	11	15	16	—	—	—	—	—
2012–13	Val Pusteria Wolves	ITL	27	5	21	26	50	10	1	5	6	16
NHL totals			175	19	26	45	97	10	1	0	1	14

== College head coaching record ==
Record table
Season	Team	Overall	Conference	Standing	Postseason
Bowdoin Polar Bears (NESCAC) (2022–present)
2022–23	Bowdoin	15–10–3	6–9–3	T–6th	NCAA First Round
Bowdoin:		15–10–3	6–9–3		
Total:		15–10–3			
National champion Postseason invitational champion Conference regular season champion Conference regular season and conference tournament champion Division regular season champion Division regular season and conference tournament champion Conference tournament champion
