= Mark Taylor (ice hockey, born 1962) =

American ice hockey coach

Current position
- Title: Head coach
- Team: Hobart
- Conference: NEHC
- Record: 473-–178–56 .709

Biographical details
- Born: June 23, 1963 (age 63); Canton, New York, USA
- Education: Elmira College

Playing career
- 1981–1983: Canton State
- 1983–1985: Elmira
- 1985–1987: Ånge IK
- Position: Defenseman

Coaching career (HC unless noted)
- 1987–1988: Middlebury (asst.)
- 1988–1989: Brown (asst.)
- 1989–1990: Vermont (asst.)
- 1990–1995: Cornell (asst.)
- 1995–2000: Massachusetts Lowell (asst.)
- 2000–Present: Hobart

Head coaching record
- Overall: 473–178–56 .709
- Tournaments: 13–10 (.545)

Accomplishments and honors

Championships
- 2023 National Champion; 2024 National Champion; 2025 National Champion

Awards
- 2023 Edward Jeremiah Award; 2024 Edward Jeremiah Award

Mark Taylor is an American ice hockey coach and former defenseman. He led the men's ice hockey team at Hobart to the program's first national championship in 2023 and was named as the national coach of the year for his efforts. Both of these accomplishments were repeated by Taylor in 2024. In 2025, he won a third straight national championship.

== Career ==
Taylor began his college career at SUNY Canton and played for the club team for two years. He transferred to Elmira College after his sophomore season and continued his playing career with the varsity squad. He helped the team make the NCAA tournament in his junior year but they lost in the quarterfinal round. After graduating, Taylor travelled to Europe and played for Ånge IK in the Swedish Division 2. After two years abroad, he retired as a player and turned to coaching.

Upon his return to North America, Taylor returned to the college ranks as an assistant at Middlebury. He ended up working on four different staffs over a 4-year period before finally settling into his role at Cornell. He worked under Brian McCutcheon, who had been his head coach at Elmira, for five years but the returns for the big red weren't up to par and the entire staff was let go after the 1995 season. Taylor moved on to Massachusetts Lowell working first under Bruce Crowder and then Tim Whitehead. He was in charge of recruiting for the River Hawks and instrumental in convincing Ron Hainsey, a draft pick of the Montreal Canadiens, to sign on with the program.

In 2000, Taylor got his first head coaching job at Hobart and took over a program that had seen very little success in its history. Over 30 years, the team had been able to post just 5 winning seasons and had never won a championship of any kind let alone make an NCAA tournament appearance. In his first few years that trend continued, however, he got the team to post its first 10-win season in 2002 in almost a decade and had them above water the next year. In the team's fourth year under Taylor, they made the NCAA tournament for the first time on the strength of a conference championship and continued to raise their profile under his leadership. The Statesmen posted their first 20-win season in 2006, making their first Frozen Four in the season season. Several more championships and highlights followed over the next decade plus but the team as unable to make a championship appearance during that successful run. After the pandemic the team was finally able to break through. After posing his 8th 20-win season in 2022, Taylor led Hobart to its best season in history, finishing the regular season with a 23–2 record while being ranked as the #1 team in the nation during the year. The Statesmen received the #3 overall seed for the NCAA tournament and rode a dominating defense to their first championship appearance. The team faced down defending national champions, Adrian and won the title in overtime. A few days before the game, Taylor was named as the recipient of the Edward Jeremiah Award, given annually to the national D-III coach of the year.

== College head coaching record ==
Record table
Season	Team	Overall	Conference	Standing	Postseason
Hobart Statesmen (ECAC West) (2000–2017)
2000–01	Hobart	6–15–4	0–5–1	4th	ECAC West Semifinal
2001–02	Hobart	10–16–0	5–5–0	4th	ECAC West Semifinal
2002–03	Hobart	14–10–2	4–5–1	4th	ECAC West Semifinal
2003–04	Hobart	15–8–5	7–2–1	1st	NCAA National Quarterfinal
2004–05	Hobart	14–6–4	5–5–0	5th	
2005–06	Hobart	20–8–0	10–5–0	2nd	NCAA National Semifinal
2006–07	Hobart	13–8–5	5–7–3	5th	ECAC West Quarterfinal
2007–08	Hobart	18–8–2	7–6–2	4th	NCAA National Quarterfinal
2008–09	Hobart	21–7–2	9–4–2	T–2nd	NCAA National Semifinal
2009–10	Hobart	13–10–3	9–4–2	3rd	ECAC West Semifinal
2010–11	Hobart	15–10–2	4–7–1	4th	ECAC West Semifinal
2011–12	Hobart	16–10–1	5–6–1	3rd	ECAC West Champion
2012–13	Hobart	19–5–2	11–3–1	T–1st	ECAC West Semifinal
2013–14	Hobart	14–9–4	7–5–3	3rd	ECAC West Semifinal
2014–15	Hobart	21–7–0	12–3–0	1st	NCAA First Round
2015–16	Hobart	21–5–2	12–3–0	1st	NCAA National Quarterfinal
2016–17	Hobart	20–5–4	9–4–1	3rd	NCAA First Round
Hobart:		270–147–42	121–79–17		
Hobart Statesmen (NEHC) (2017–2025)
2017–18	Hobart	18–6–5	12–3–3	2nd	NCAA First Round
2018–19	Hobart	21–8–2	11–5–2	4th	NCAA National Semifinal
2019–20	Hobart	20–5–3	12–4–2	3rd	NCAA tournament cancelled
2020–21	Hobart				season cancelled
2021–22	Hobart	20–6–2	13–2–2	1st	NCAA National Quarterfinal
2022–23	Hobart	29–2–0	16–2–0	1st	NCAA National Champion
2023–24	Hobart	28–2–1	16–1–1	1st	NCAA National Champion
2024–25	Hobart	29–1–1	18–1–1	1st	NCAA National Champion
Hobart:		165–30–14 .823	98–18–11 .815		
Hobart Statesmen (SUNYAC) (2025–present)
2025–26	Hobart	30–1–0	18–0–0	1st	Tournament National Championship
2026–27	Hobart	8–0–0	4–0–0		
Hobart:		38–1–0	22–0–0		
Total:		473–178–56 .709			
National champion Postseason invitational champion Conference regular season champion Conference regular season and conference tournament champion Division regular season champion Division regular season and conference tournament champion Conference tournament champion

== See also ==
- List of college men's ice hockey coaches with 400 wins

Awards and achievements
Preceded by Adam Krug	Edward Jeremiah Award; 2022–23, 2023–24	Succeeded by Peter Roundy
