= 2023–24 NCAA Division III men's ice hockey season =

- Duration: October 27, 2023– March 23, 2024
- NCAA tournament: 2024
- National championship: Koeppel Community Center; Hartford, Connecticut
- NCAA champion: Hobart
- Sid Watson Award: Devon Bobak (Trinity)

The 2023–24 NCAA Division III men's ice hockey season began on October 27, 2023, and concluded on March 23, 2024. This was the 51st season of Division III college ice hockey.

== Regular season ==
After the closure of Finlandia University the entire ice hockey program (men's and women's) was transferred to the University of Dubuque.

MCLA restarted its ice hockey program this season, returning to the ice for the first time since 2003.

=== Little East ===
Prior to the start of the season, the Little East Conference announced that it would begin sponsoring ice hockey for the first time. The conference projected to begin play in the 2025–26 season and would coincide with the return of Keene State's ice hockey program. The other five Little East members who already fielded teams were Massachusetts–Boston, Massachusetts–Dartmouth, Plymouth State, Southern Maine and Vermont State Castleton. Because the conference would begin play with six member teams, the Little east would immediately receive an automatic bid for the NCAA tournament.

=== Season tournaments ===
Tournament	Dates	Teams	Champion
Buffalo State Tournament	October 27–28	4	Salve Regina
Western Massachusetts Invitational	October 27–28	4	Westfield State
Worcester City Cup	October 27, 29	4	Assumption
Terry Moran Invitational Tournament	November 24–25	4	Rivier
Bowdoin/Colby Tournament	November 25–26	4	Bowdoin
LayerEight Shootout	November 25–26	4	Plattsburgh State
North Country Tournament	November 25–26	4	Trine
Utica Thanksgiving Showcase	November 25–26	4	Elmira
Skidmore Thanksgiving Invitational	November 25–26	4	Brockport State
Superior Showdown	December 29–30	4	Wisconsin–Superior
Northfield Savings Bank Tournament	December 30–31	4	University of New England
Oswego State Classic	December 30–31	4	Stevenson
Codfish Bowl	January 5–6	4	Connecticut College
Comfort Inn Complex Winter Classic	January 5–6	4	Plattsburgh State
Boston Landing Invitational	January 6–7	4	Tufts

=== Standings ===
2023–24 Commonwealth Coast Conference ice hockey standings
	Conference										Overall					
	GP	W	L	T	OTW	OTL	SOW	PTS	GF	GA	GP	W	L	T	GF	GA
#12 Curry †	18	15	3	0	1	0	0	44	60	32	28	21	6	1	92	57
#14 Endicott *	18	12	3	3	2	2	1	40	68	34	28	17	6	5	102	59
University of New England	18	10	4	4	3	1	2	34	56	37	27	17	6	4	83	54
Salve Regina	18	10	6	2	1	2	1	34	60	44	28	17	9	2	107	64
Wentworth	18	6	11	1	1	0	1	19	38	61	26	10	15	1	65	90
Nichols	18	4	10	4	1	2	1	18	36	52	26	6	16	4	52	86
Suffolk	18	4	13	1	0	1	0	14	39	62	25	5	18	2	55	92
Western New England	18	2	13	3	0	1	2	12	37	72	25	5	17	3	65	99
Championship: March 2 † indicates conference regular season champion * indicates conference tournament champions

2023–24 NCAA Division III Independent ice hockey standings
	Overall record					
	GP	W	L	T	GF	GA
Albertus Magnus	25	16	9	0	85	57
Anna Maria	24	14	9	1	83	69
Canton State	25	8	16	1	65	99
Rivier	24	10	11	3	72	72

2023–24 Massachusetts State Collegiate Athletic Conference ice hockey standings
	Conference									Overall					
	GP	W	L	T	OTW	OTL	PTS	GF	GA	GP	W	L	T	GF	GA
#9 Plymouth State †*	21	18	1	2	1	0	56	111	38	29	24	3	2	141	56
Fitchburg State	21	13	6	2	2	0	40	69	60	27	15	10	2	80	77
Massachusetts–Dartmouth	21	13	8	0	1	2	40	77	64	27	16	11	0	94	83
Westfield State	21	9	10	2	1	1	30	67	71	27	13	12	2	89	86
Framingham State	21	8	11	2	1	2	28	61	73	26	8	16	2	66	90
Worcester State	21	7	14	0	0	1	22	60	85	26	8	18	0	73	104
Salem State	21	6	14	1	0	1	20.5	68	84	25	6	18	1	80	112
MCLA	21	5	15	1	2	1	15.5	42	80	25	7	17	1	51	91
Championship: March 2 † indicates conference regular season champion * indicates conference tournament champions

2023–24 Minnesota Intercollegiate Athletic Conference ice hockey standings
	Conference										Overall					
	GP	W	L	T	OTW	OTL	SOW	PTS	GF	GA	GP	W	L	T	GF	GA
Augsburg †	16	12	3	1	0	0	0	36	52	30	26	15	9	2	74	65
Bethel	16	11	3	2	3	1	2	33	56	38	27	18	6	3	82	60
St. Scholastica	16	8	7	1	1	1	1	26	46	43	26	15	10	1	87	68
Saint Mary's	16	8	7	1	1	0	1	24	38	48	26	10	14	2	64	94
St. Olaf *	16	7	7	2	1	0	1	21	50	41	29	14	12	3	92	65
Saint John's	16	6	9	1	0	2	0	21	42	48	25	9	12	4	62	67
Gustavus Adolphus	16	6	9	1	1	0	0	18	48	46	25	11	12	2	75	70
Concordia (MN)	16	5	9	2	1	2	0	18	45	60	25	10	12	3	78	83
Hamline	16	3	12	1	1	2	0	12	37	60	25	7	16	2	65	85
Championship: March 2 † indicates conference regular season champion * indicates conference tournament champion

2023–24 New England Hockey Conference standings
	Conference									Overall					
	GP	W	L	T	OW	OL	PTS	GF	GA	GP	W	L	T	GF	GA
#1 Hobart †*	18	16	1	1	0	0	49	106	18	31	28	2	1	161	30
Norwich	18	11	4	3	0	1	37	56	27	26	14	8	4	77	45
#11 Skidmore	18	12	5	1	0	0	37	60	35	28	19	7	2	99	55
#10 Elmira	18	11	6	1	1	1	34	66	49	29	20	8	1	117	72
Babson	18	12	5	1	3	0	34	57	50	26	14	10	2	79	75
Massachusetts–Boston	18	7	11	0	0	1	22	45	63	26	9	15	2	67	91
Southern Maine	18	6	9	3	1	1	21	52	73	27	10	14	3	80	98
Vermont State Castleton	18	4	14	0	1	1	12	43	89	26	7	19	0	68	124
Johnson & Wales	18	3	14	1	0	1	11	40	85	25	6	17	2	65	111
New England College	18	2	15	1	0	0	7	28	64	25	4	20	1	38	90
Championship: March 2 † indicates conference regular season champion * indicates conference tournament champion

2023–24 New England Small College Athletic Conference ice hockey standings
	Conference									Overall					
	GP	RW	OTW	RL	OTL	T	PTS	GF	GA	GP	W	L	T	GF	GA
#3 Trinity †*	18	15	1	1	0	1	48.5	61	22	28	23	4	1	98	37
Bowdoin	18	8	2	3	1	4	35	46	34	25	14	7	4	68	54
Tufts	18	9	0	3	4	2	34	54	45	25	13	9	3	76	62
Hamilton	18	10	1	6	0	1	33.5	55	46	25	17	7	1	82	62
Amherst	18	8	1	8	0	1	27.5	57	55	25	14	10	1	86	73
Connecticut College	18	6	1	9	2	0	22	42	53	25	9	14	2	64	72
Middlebury	18	4	1	8	2	3	20.5	41	48	26	8	14	4	59	77
Colby	18	4	1	9	0	4	20	41	48	25	9	12	4	68	63
Williams	18	5	1	11	0	1	18.5	47	64	24	9	14	1	58	84
Wesleyan	18	2	1	13	1	1	10.5	29	58	24	5	18	1	37	71
Championship: March 3 † indicates conference regular season champion * indicates conference tournament champion

2023–24 Northern Collegiate Hockey Association standings
	Conference										Overall					
	GP	W	L	T	OTW	OTL	SOW	PTS	GF	GA	GP	W	L	T	GF	GA
#4 Adrian †	18	16	2	0	1	0	0	47	94	34	32	24	7	1	143	57
#5 St. Norbert *	18	15	3	0	3	0	0	42	75	40	30	23	7	0	117	69
Trine	18	13	5	0	3	1	0	37	70	48	28	20	8	0	108	76
Aurora	18	12	6	0	1	0	0	35	71	56	28	15	12	1	93	81
MSOE	18	8	9	1	1	2	1	27	51	48	27	14	11	2	81	67
Lawrence	18	6	10	2	1	1	0	20	47	58	27	8	17	2	73	98
Marian	18	5	12	1	1	2	1	18	51	70	27	9	17	1	80	99
Concordia (WI)	18	6	12	0	2	2	0	18	50	83	27	8	19	0	73	129
Lake Forest	18	4	14	0	0	4	0	16	49	73	25	7	18	0	75	98
Dubuque	18	3	15	0	0	1	0	10	26	74	24	3	19	2	35	96
Championship: March 2 † indicates conference regular season champion * indicates conference tournament champion

2023–24 State University of New York Athletic Conference ice hockey standings
	Conference								Overall					
	GP	W	L	T	OTL	PTS	GF	GA	GP	W	L	T	GF	GA
#7 Geneseo State †	16	14	2	0	0	28	73	31	27	21	6	0	112	59
Oswego State	16	12	4	0	1	25	66	29	26	16	9	1	95	67
#8 Plattsburgh State	16	12	3	1	0	25	68	37	28	21	5	2	111	60
#13 Cortland State *	16	10	5	1	0	21	56	40	29	18	9	2	108	73
Brockport State	16	5	9	2	1	13	45	57	26	8	14	4	69	95
Potsdam State	16	5	11	0	0	10	32	61	26	8	17	1	52	92
Fredonia State	16	4	11	1	1	10	35	56	25	6	18	1	52	85
Buffalo State	16	4	10	2	0	10	39	55	25	9	14	2	71	88
Morrisville State	16	2	13	1	0	5	29	77	25	5	19	1	54	109
Championship: March 2 † indicates conference regular season champion * indicates conference tournament champions

2023–24 United Collegiate Hockey Conference standings
	Conference record										Overall record					
	GP	W	L	T	OW	OL	SW	PTS	GF	GA	GP	W	L	T	GF	GA
#2 Utica †*	20	19	0	1	0	0	0	58	114	28	30	24	3	3	137	45
#15 Stevenson	20	15	4	1	0	1	1	48	75	41	28	21	6	1	107	57
Wilkes	20	15	5	0	3	0	0	42	79	45	27	18	9	0	100	64
Alvernia	20	10	9	1	1	0	0	30	61	62	27	13	12	2	85	81
Manhattanville	20	9	11	0	0	2	0	29	63	70	26	9	17	0	76	100
Chatham	20	8	12	0	2	2	0	24	53	61	26	11	15	0	74	87
King's	20	8	12	0	1	0	0	23	48	85	26	9	17	0	61	112
Nazareth	20	5	13	2	0	2	2	21	60	76	26	6	18	2	56	85
Neumann	20	7	12	1	1	0	0	21	44	64	24	7	16	1	63	91
Lebanon Valley	20	6	14	0	1	1	0	18	54	75	25	7	18	0	67	101
Arcadia	20	3	13	4	0	1	2	16	45	89	25	7	14	4	67	104
Championship: March 2 † indicates conference regular season champion * indicates conference tournament champions

2023–24 Wisconsin Intercollegiate Athletic Conference ice hockey standings
	Conference									Overall					
	GP	W	L	T	OTW	OTL	PTS	GF	GA	GP	W	L	T	GF	GA
#6 Wisconsin–Stevens Point †*	15	13	2	0	2	0	37	51	35	29	21	6	2	100	70
Wisconsin–Eau Claire	15	10	4	1	1	1	31	42	20	28	17	9	2	82	52
Wisconsin–Stout	15	8	7	0	0	2	26	55	41	29	13	14	2	102	91
Wisconsin–River Falls	15	6	7	2	0	0	21	35	40	29	16	10	3	73	67
Wisconsin–Superior	15	6	8	1	0	0	20	29	30	27	11	15	1	53	62
Northland	15	0	15	0	0	0	0	13	59	27	1	26	0	33	126
Championship: March 2 † indicates conference regular season champion * indicates conference tournament champion

Note: Mini-games are not included in final standings

== PairWise Rankings ==
The PairWise Rankings (PWR) are a statistical tool designed to approximate the process by which the NCAA selection committee decides which teams get at-large bids to the 16-team NCAA tournament. Although the NCAA selection committee does not use the PWR as presented by USCHO, the PWR has been accurate in predicting which teams will make the tournament field.

For Division III men, all teams are included in comparisons starting in the 2013–14 season (formerly, only teams with a Ratings Percentage Index of .500 or above, or teams under consideration, were included). The PWR method compares each team with every other such team, with the winner of each “comparison” earning one PWR point. After all comparisons are made, the points are totaled up and rankings listed accordingly.

With 85 Division III men's teams, the greatest number of PWR points any team could earn is 84, winning the comparison with every other team. Meanwhile, a team that lost all of its comparisons would have no PWR points.

Teams are then ranked by PWR point total, with ties broken by the teams’ RPI ratings, which starting in 2013–14 is weighted for home and road games and includes a quality wins bonus (QWB) for beating teams in the top 20 of the RPI (it also is weighted for home and road).

When it comes to comparing teams, the PWR uses three criteria which are combined to make a comparison: RPI, record against common opponents and head-to-head competition. Starting in 2013–14, the comparison of record against teams under consideration was dropped because all teams are now under comparison.

NCAA Division I Men's Hockey PairWise Rankings
Rank	Team	PWR	RPI	Conference
1	Hobart	84	.6546*	NEHC
2	Trinity	83	.6065*	NESCAC
3	Adrian	82	.5971*	NCHA
4	Utica	80	.5937*	UCHC
4	Plymouth State	80	.5825*	MASCAC
6	St. Norbert	79	.5812*	NCHA
6	Elmira	79	.5789	NEHC
8	Wisconsin–Stevens Point	77	.5771*	WIAC
9	Geneseo State	76	.5771*	SUNYAC
10	Curry	75	.5718*	CCC
11	Skidmore	74	.5678	NEHC
12	Plattsburgh State	73	.5674*	SUNYAC
13	Stevenson	72	.5626	UCHC
14	Bethel	71	.5626	MIAC
15	Endicott	69	.5580	CCC
15	Hamilton	69	.5561	NESCAC
17	Tufts	68	.5519	NESCAC
18	Norwich	67	.5513	NEHC
19	Cortland State	66	.5472*	SUNYAC
20	University of New England	65	.5465	CCC
21	Salve Regina	63	.5450	CCC
21	Trine	63	.5419	NCHA
23	Bowdoin	62	.5409	NESCAC
24	Oswego State	60	.5397	SUNYAC
24	Wisconsin–Eau Claire	60	.5397*	WIAC
26	Augsburg	59	.5399*	MIAC
26	Amherst	59	.5379	NESCAC
28	Anna Maria	57	.5368	Independent
28	St. Olaf	57	.5331*	MIAC
30	St. Scholastica	55	.5314*	MIAC
31	Babson	53	.5269	NEHC
31	Wisconsin–River Falls	53	.5238*	WIAC
33	Albertus Magnus	52	.5237	Independent
34	Wilkes	51	.5234	UCHC
35	Aurora	50	.5187	NCHA
35	MSOE	50	.5152	NCHA
37	Fitchburg State	48	.5119	MASCAC
38	Massachusetts–Dartmouth	47	.5070	MASCAC
39	Connecticut College	46	.5069	NESCAC
40	Saint John's	45	.5013	MIAC
41	Middlebury	43	.5003	NESCAC
42	Wisconsin–Stout	42	.5032	WIAC
42	Southern Maine	42	.4961	NEHC
44	Massachusetts–Boston	41	.4946	NEHC
44	Williams	41	.4940	NESCAC
46	Concordia (MN)	40	.4901	MIAC
47	Alvernia	38	.4881	UCHC
47	Gustavus Adolphus	38	.4869	MIAC
49	Colby	36	.4834	NESCAC
50	Westfield State	35	.4803	MASCAC
51	Saint Mary's	34	.4759	MIAC
52	Marian	33	.4736	NCHA
53	Chatham	32	.4718	UCHC
54	Wentworth	31	.4716	CCC
55	Wisconsin–Superior	30	.4686	WIAC
56	Brockport State	29	.4677	SUNYAC
57	Buffalo State	28	.4671	SUNYAC
58	Manhattanville	27	.4629	UCHC
59	King's	26	.4600	UCHC
60	Hamline	25	.4591	MIAC
61	Lawrence	24	.4580	NCHA
62	Rivier	23	.4567	Independent
63	Concordia (WI)	22	.4566	NCHA
64	Framingham State	21	.4562	MASCAC
65	Nazareth	20	.4530	UCHC
66	Nichols	19	.4504	CCC
67	Wesleyan	18	.4492	NESCAC
68	Canton State	17	.4461	Independent
69	Johnson & Wales	16	.4459	NEHC
70	Neumann	15	.4455	UCHC
71	Lake Forest	14	.4451	NCHA
72	Potsdam State	13	.4416	SUNYAC
73	Worcester State	12	.4392	MASCAC
74	Suffolk	11	.4390	CCC
75	Vermont State Castleton	10	.4369	NEHC
76	Arcadia	9	.4361	UCHC
77	Lebanon Valley	8	.4338	UCHC
78	Fredonia State	7	.4296	SUNYAC
79	New England College	6	.4280	NEHC
80	Salem State	5	.4273	MASCAC
81	MCLA	4	.4258	MASCAC
82	Dubuque	3	.4218	NCHA
83	Western New England	2	.4165	CCC
84	Morrisville State	1	.4075	SUNYAC
85	Northland	0	.3750	WIAC
*A team's RPI has been adjusted to remove negative effect from defeating a weak opponent Note: A team's record is based only on games against other Division III hockey schools which are eligible for the NCAA Tournament.

== 2024 NCAA Tournament ==
First round March 9
E5	Elmira	5
E8	Endicott	2
W1	St. Norbert (3)	5
W4	St. Olaf	2
W2	Adrian	4
W3	Wisconsin–Stevens Point	0
E6	Geneseo State	0
E7	Curry	3
E4	Plymouth State	5
E9	Cortland State	2

Quarterfinals; March 16
E2	Trinity (2)	2
E5	Elmira	0
W1	St. Norbert (3)	3
W2	Adrian	5
E1	Hobart (1)	4****
E7	Curry	3
E3	Utica (4)	4
E4	Plymouth State	1

Semifinals; March 21
E2	Trinity (2)	2
W2	Adrian	1
E1	Hobart (1)	3
E3	Utica (4)	1

National Championship; March 23
E2	Trinity (2)	0
E1	Hobart (1)	2

Note: * denotes overtime period(s)

== Player stats ==
=== Scoring leaders ===
GP = Games played; G = Goals; A = Assists; Pts = Points; PIM = Penalty minutes

Player	Class	Team	GP	G	A	Pts	PIM
Will Redick	Sophomore	Plymouth State	27	27	31	58	16
Ronny Paragallo	Junior	Assumption	32	23	25	48	22
Mathew Rehding	Senior	Adrian	32	16	32	48	24
Tanner Hartman	Sophomore	Hobart	31	20	25	45	16
Adam Stacho	Senior	St. Norbert	29	20	24	44	4
Liam Fraser	Junior	St. Norbert	29	17	27	44	8
Shane Bull	Senior	Oswego State	26	22	20	42	10
Zach Heintz	Senior	Adrian	28	18	22	40	19
Tyler Flack	Senior	Oswego State	26	17	23	40	12
Shawn Kennedy	Senior	Elmira	28	13	26	39	36
Jaden Shields	Senior	Adrian	32	11	28	39	20

=== Leading goaltenders ===
GP = Games played; Min = Minutes played; W = Wins; L = Losses; T = Ties; GA = Goals against; SO = Shutouts; SV% = Save percentage; GAA = Goals against average

Player	Class	Team	GP	Min	W	L	T	GA	SO	SV%	GAA
Mavrick Goyer	Sophomore	Hobart	10	596	9	1	0	9	6	.947	0.91
Damon Beaver	Sophomore	Hobart	20	1280	18	1	1	20	7	.962	0.94
Bryan Landsberger	Junior	Utica	10	528	9	0	0	10	2	.951	1.14
Devon Bobak	Sophomore	Trinity	30	1768	25	4	1	35	7	.946	1.19
Bryce Walcarius	Freshman	Norwich	11	617	7	1	2	15	2	.940	1.46
Ethan Roberts	Sophomore	Utica	21	1262	15	3	3	33	3	.941	1.57
Shane Soderwall	Freshman	Curry	21	1247	15	4	0	33	4	.949	1.59
Sami Molu	Freshman	Norwich	15	891	7	6	2	24	1	.943	1.62
Jacob Torgner	Freshman	Geneseo State	12	654	9	2	0	19	2	.944	1.74
Tate Brandon	Senior	Skidmore	27	1537	19	5	2	45	4	.938	1.76

== Awards ==
=== NCAA ===
Award		Recipient
Sid Watson Award		Devon Bobak, Trinity
Edward Jeremiah Award		Mark Taylor, Hobart
Tournament Most Outstanding Player		Austin Mourar, Hobart
East First Team	Position	West First Team
Devon Bobak, Trinity	G	Samuel Vyletelka, Augsburg
Danny Magnuson, Skidmore	D	Connor Kalthoff, St. Olaf
Brian Scoville, Utica	D	Jaden Shields, Adrian
Shane Bull, Oswego State	F	Liam Fraser, St. Norbert
Tanner Hartman, Hobart	F	Zachary Heintz, Adrian
Will Redick, Plymouth State	F	Adam Stacho, St. Norbert
East Second Team	Position	West Second Team
Ty Outen, Stevenson	G	Dershahn Stewart, Adrian
Ned Blanchard, Trinity	D	Dayton Deics, St. Norbert
Alex Wilkins, Geneseo	D	Mick Heneghan, Wisconsin–Stevens Point
Ignat Belov, Hobart	F	Fletcher Anderson, Wisconsin–Stevens Point
Artem Buzoverya, Chatham	F	Tyler Kostelecky, Bethel
Andrew Kurapov, Endicott	F	Mathew Rehding, Adrian
East Third Team	Position	
Tate Brandon, Skidmore	G	
Cole Jungwirth, Wilkes	D	
James Philpott, Hamilton	D	
Tyler Flack, Oswego State	F	
Liam McCanney, Stevenson	F	
Bennett Stockdale, Plattsburgh State	F	

== See also ==
- 2023–24 NCAA Division I men's ice hockey season
- 2023–24 NCAA Division II men's ice hockey season
