= 2024 NCAA Division III men's ice hockey tournament =

- Teams: 13
- Finals site: Koeppel Community Center, Hartford, Connecticut
- Champions: Hobart (2nd title)
- Runner-up: Trinity (3rd title game)
- Semifinalists: Adrian (6th Frozen Four); Utica (2nd Frozen Four)
- Winning coach: Mark Taylor (2nd title)
- MOP: Austin Mourar (Hobart)
- Attendance: 1,736 (final)

The 2024 NCAA Division III men's ice hockey tournament was the culmination of the 2023–24 season, the 39th such tournament in NCAA history. Hobart successfully defended its championship by defeating Trinity 2–0. They became the first team to win consecutive championships since St. Norbert in 2011 and 2012.

== Qualifying teams ==
In January, the NCAA approved the addition of a 13th bid for this season's NCAA tournament. The move was done to keep the ratio of 1:6.5 bids per Division III programs and, with the revival of MCLA, that necessitated 13 teams being part of the tournament field. The selection process remained unchanged and teams were sill selected according to the following manner: (Pool A) nine teams received bids as a result of being conference tournament champions from conferences that possessed an automatic bid, (Pool C) four additional teams received at-large bids based upon their records.

East							West						
Seed	School	Conference	Record	Berth Type	Appearance	Last Bid	Seed	School	Conference	Record	Berth Type	Appearance	Last Bid
1	Hobart (1)	NEHC	25–2–1	Tournament Champion	13th	2023	1	St. Norbert (3)	NCHA	22–6–0	Tournament Champion	21st	2022
2	Trinity (2)	NESCAC	21–3–1	Tournament Champion	9th	2022	2	Adrian	NCHA	22–6–1	At-Large	12th	2023
3	Utica (4)	UCHC	23–2–3	Tournament Champion	5th	2023	3	Wisconsin–Stevens Point	WIAC	21–5–2	Tournament Champion	17th	2023
4	Plymouth State	MASCAC	23–2–2	Tournament Champion	7th	2023	4	St. Olaf	MIAC	16–9–2	Tournament Champion	3rd	2022
5	Elmira	NEHC	19–7–1	At-Large	17th	2022							
6	Geneseo State	SUNYAC	21–5–0	At-Large	10th	2022							
7	Curry	CCC	20–5–1	At-Large	6th	2023							
8	Endicott	CCC	17–5–5	Tournament Champion	4th	2023							
9	Cortland State	SUNYAC	18–8–2	Tournament Champion	1st	Never							

== Format ==
The tournament featured four rounds of play. All rounds were single-game elimination.

Because there were four western bids, those teams were all placed into the same bracket. The remaining nine (eastern) teams were arranged so that the top three teams received byes into the quarterfinal round. The eastern teams that began in the first round were sorted as follows: the fourth eastern seed would play the ninth eastern seed with the winner advancing to play the third eastern seed; the fifth eastern seed would play the eighth eastern seed with the winner advancing to play the second eastern seed; the sixth eastern seed would play the seventh eastern seed with the winner advancing to play the first eastern seed. The four brackets were arranged so that the winner of the one containing the first overall seed would play the winner of the bracket with the fourth overall seed. The higher-seeded team played host in all first round and quarterfinal matches.

== Bracket ==
First round March 9
E5	Elmira	5
E8	Endicott	2
W1	St. Norbert (3)	5
W4	St. Olaf	2
W2	Adrian	4
W3	Wisconsin–Stevens Point	0
E6	Geneseo State	0
E7	Curry	3
E4	Plymouth State	5
E9	Cortland State	2

Quarterfinals; March 16
E2	Trinity (2)	2
E5	Elmira	0
W1	St. Norbert (3)	3
W2	Adrian	5
E1	Hobart (1)	4****
E7	Curry	3
E3	Utica (4)	4
E4	Plymouth State	1

Semifinals; March 21
E2	Trinity (2)	2
W2	Adrian	1
E1	Hobart (1)	3
E3	Utica (4)	1

National Championship; March 23
E2	Trinity (2)	0
E1	Hobart (1)	2

Note: * denotes overtime period(s)

== Results ==
=== First round ===
March 9, 2024; 7:00 PM	(E5) Elmira	5 – 2 (1–0, 2–1, 2–1)	(E8) Endicott	Murray Athletic Center – Horseheads, New York; Attendance: 1,055

Game reference

Kyle Curtin
Goalies
Atticus Kelly

(Kennedy, Domitrovic) Janis Vizbelis (17) – 13:30	1–0
(Domitrovic, Kennedy) Janis Vizbelis (18) – 20:24	2–0
Ryan Reifler (10) – 29:36	3–0
	3–1	31:04 – Jimmy McIsaac (7)
(Smith) Ryan Reifler (11) – 41:08	4–1
	4–2	56:22 – SH – Jimmy McIsaac (8) (Willett)
(Kennedy, Gonzalez) Nicholas Domitrovic (18) – 59:36	5–2

20 min
Penalties
32 min
29
Shots
28

March 9, 2024; 7:05 PM	(W1) St. Norbert	5 – 2 (0–0, 2–2, 3–0)	(W4) St. Olaf	Cornerstone Community Center – Ashwaubenon, Wisconsin; Attendance: 1,092

Game reference

Hunter Garvey
Goalies
Thomas Lalonde

(Stromp, Morris) Carter Hottmann (7) – 21:27	1–0
(Koufis, Stromp) Carter Hottmann (8) – 27:15	2–0
	2–1	29:52 – Jon Panisa (8) (Sherman, Kalthoff)
	2–2	38:28 – Jonathan Young (11) (Boxer, Kalthoff)
(Baker, Hammond) Calvin Hanson (5) – 46:07	3–2
(Strand, Stromp) T.J. Koufis (14) – 56:18	4–2
Mark Snarr (3) – EN – 59:00	5–2

6 min
Penalties
16 min
36
Shots
20

March 9, 2024; 7:00 PM	(W2) Adrian	4 – 0 (2–0, 1–0, 1–0)	(E8) Wisconsin–Stevens Point	Arrington Ice Arena – Adrian, Michigan; Attendance: 1,293

Game reference

Dershahn Stewart
Goalies
Alex Proctor
Referees:
Bill Jones
Travis Ahlberg
Linesmen:
Caid Blessing
Steve Gurchinoff

(Somers, Rehding) Jaden Shields (11) – 01:33	1–0
(Babiak) Casey Gerstein (12) – 12:42	2–0
(Heintz, Shields) Jake Suede (12) – PP – 23:22	3–0
Riley Murphy (11) – EN – 58:49	4–0

10 min
Penalties
10 min
32
Shots
28

March 9, 2024; 7:00 PM	(E6) Geneseo State	0 – 3 (0–1, 0–0, 0–2)	(W7) Curry	Ira S. Wilson Ice Arena – Geneseo, New York; Attendance: 1,177

Game reference

Adam Harris
Goalies
Shane Soderwall
Referees:
Craig Florkowski
John Melancon
Linesmen:
Anthony Perez
Mike Verminski

0–1	09:20 – PP – Tao Ishizuka (10) (Connor)
0–2	48:44 – Jesse Galassi (5) (McDonough)
0–3	59:58 – EN – Gage Dill (11)

8 min
Penalties
8 min
35
Shots
25

March 9, 2024; 7:00 PM	(E4) Plymouth State	5 – 2 (0–0, 2–1, 3–1)	(E9) Cortland State	Plymouth State University Ice Arena – Holderness, New Hampshire; Attendance: 1,077

Game reference

Kalle Andersson
Goalies
Jack Riedell
Referees:
Dan Gosselin
Andrew Spinali
Linesmen:
Steve Riley
Joshua Berenson

(Patton) David Matoušek (7) – 27:06	1–0
	1–1	30:46 – Nathan Berke (16) (Kyrkostas, Seitz)
Will Redick (27) – 39:11	2–1
	2–2	46:20 – Colby Seitz (13) (Kyrkostas, Riedell)
(McCallum, Redick) Connor Tait (17) – PP – 51:05	3–2
(Redick, Pray) Connor Tait (18) – EN – 59:07	4–2
(O'Connell, Patton) David Matoušek (8) – 59:30	5–2

21 min
Penalties
31 min
45
Shots
34

=== Quarterfinals ===
March 16, 2024; 7:00 PM	(E2) Trinity	2 – 0 (2–0, 0–0, 0–0)	(E5) Elmira	Koeppel Community Center – Hartford, Connecticut; Attendance: 571

Game reference
Devon Bobak	Goalies	Kyle Curtin	Referees: Matt Fitzgibbons; Joe Baudo; Linesmen: Cam Goebert; Rick Urnick
(Barbour, Campomenosi) Alex Mozian (8) – PP – 07:42 / 1–0; (Sedlak, Tongue) Gerard Marretta (10) – 10:40 / 2–0			Referees: Matt Fitzgibbons; Joe Baudo; Linesmen: Cam Goebert; Rick Urnick
8 min	Penalties	6 min	Referees: Matt Fitzgibbons; Joe Baudo; Linesmen: Cam Goebert; Rick Urnick
34	Shots	35	Referees: Matt Fitzgibbons; Joe Baudo; Linesmen: Cam Goebert; Rick Urnick

March 16, 2024; 7:05 PM	(W1) St. Norbert	3 – 5 (1–1, 2–3, 0–1)	(W2) Adrian	Arrington Ice Arena – Adrian, Michigan; Attendance: 1,242

Game reference

Hunter Garvey
Goalies
Dershahn Stewart
Referees:
Ed Moberg
Shane Dillon
Linesmen:
Brett Straley
Brad Constant

(Koufis, Snarr) Carter Hottmann (8) – 00:14	1–0
	1–1	08:18 – Ian Amsbaugh (8) (Murphy, Suede)
	1–2	22:55 – Matt Couto (2) (Rehding, Somers)
	1–3	36:36 – PP – Zach Heintz (18) (Shields, Rehding)
(Stromp, Snarr) Carter Hottmann (9) – 38:28	2–3
(Fraser, Deics) Adam Stacho (20) – PP – 38:42	3–3
	3–4	39:57 – Riley Murphy (12) (Suede)
	3–5	59:45 – EN – Riley Murphy (13) (Suede)

4 min
Penalties
6 min
32
Shots
33

March 16, 2024; 7:00 PM	(E1) Hobart	4 – 3 (4OT) (0–1, 1–1, 2–1, 0–0, 0–0, 0–0, 1–0)	(E7) Curry	Geneva Recreation Complex – Geneva, New York; Attendance: 640

Game reference

Damon Beaver
Goalies
Shane Soderwall
Referees:
Andrew Spinali
Derek Sylvester
Linesmen:
Dan Barreca
Rick Urnick

	0–1	19:28 – Killian Rowlee (11) (Patriksson, Vonakis)
	0–2	24:38 – Gage Dill (12) (Duncan)
(Fontana) Tanner Daniels (8) – 35:21	1–2
(Alexander, Lally) Christopher Duclair (15) – 41:44	2–2
(Aquaro, Patterson) Jonah Alexander (6) – 44:16	3–2
	3–3	53:15 – Tao Ishizuka (11) (Bellefeuille, Connor)
(Daniels, Fontana) Bauer Morrissey (5) – 135:17	4–3

4 min
Penalties
6 min
102
Shots
47

March 16, 2024; 7:00 PM	(E3) Utica	4 – 1 (1–0, 2–1, 1–0)	(E4) Plymouth State	Adirondack Bank Center – Utica, New York; Attendance: 4,261

Game reference

Ethan Roberts
Goalies
Kalle Andersson

(Koufis, Snarr) Jakob Breault (11) – 15:11	1–0
(Herrera, Scoville) Chris Carroll (4) – PP – 27:37	2–0
	2–1	31:18 – Colin Tracy (1) (Tait, Lockhart)
(Hughes, Carroll) Andrew Della Rovere (5) – 35:41	3–1
(Della Rovere, Hughes) Chris Carroll (5) – 46:40	4–1

4 min
Penalties
4 min
34
Shots
35

=== Semifinals ===
March 21, 2024; 7:00 PM	(E2) Trinity	2 – 1 (1–0, 1–1, 0–0)	(W2) Adrian	Koeppel Community Center – Hartford, Connecticut; Attendance: 1,165

Game reference

Devon Bobak
Goalies
Dershahn Stewart
Referees:
Craig Florkowski
Derek Sylvester
Linesmen:
Dan Barreca
Jacob Zaremski

(Sedlak, Harney) James Barbour (6) – 13:29	1–0
(Sedlak) Devan Tongue (8) – 21:32	2–0
	2–1	43:56 – Bradley Somers (13) (Heintz, Babiak)

4 min
Penalties
4 min
37
Shots
32

March 21, 2024; 3:00 PM	(E1) Hobart	3 – 1 (2–0, 0–1, 1–0)	(E3) Utica	Koeppel Community Center – Hartford, Connecticut; Attendance: 701

Game reference

Damon Beaver
Goalies
Ethan Roberts

(Fasig, Daniels) Austin Mourar (8) – 00:52	1–0
(Fasig) Tanner Hartman (20) – 07:25	2–0
	2–1	29:55 – Michael Herrera (12) (Morse)
(Aquaro) Shane Shell (7) – EN – 59:35	3–1

6 min
Penalties
4 min
27
Shots
23

=== National Championship ===
March 23, 2024; 7:00 PM	(E1) Hobart	2 – 0 (0–0, 1–0, 1–0)	(E2) Trinity	Koeppel Community Center – Hartford, Connecticut; Attendance: 1,736

Game reference
Damon Beaver	Goalies	Devon Bobak	Referees: Derek Slyvester; Bill Jones; Linesmen: Dan Barreca; Jacob Zaremski
(Alexander) Luke Aquaro (17) – 38:59 / 1–0; Matthew Iasenza (2) – EN – 59:35 / 2–0			Referees: Derek Slyvester; Bill Jones; Linesmen: Dan Barreca; Jacob Zaremski
8 min	Penalties	2 min	Referees: Derek Slyvester; Bill Jones; Linesmen: Dan Barreca; Jacob Zaremski
34	Shots	24	Referees: Derek Slyvester; Bill Jones; Linesmen: Dan Barreca; Jacob Zaremski

== All-Tournament Team ==
- G: Damon Beaver (Hobart)
- D: Austin Mourar* (Hobart)
- D: John Campomenosi (Trinity)
- F: Tanner Hartman (Hobart)
- F: Luke Aquaro (Hobart)
- F: James Barbour (Trinity)

* Most Outstanding Player(s)

== Record by conference ==
Conference	# of Bids	Record	Win %	Quarterfinals	Frozen Four	Championship Game	Champions
NEHC	2	4–1	.800	2	1	1	1
NCHA	2	3–2	.600	2	1	-	-
CCC	2	1–2	.333	1	-	-	-
SUNYAC	2	0–2	.000	-	-	-	-
NESCAC	1	2–1	.667	1	1	1	-
UCHC	1	1–1	.500	1	1	-	-
MASCAC	1	1–1	.500	1	-	-	-
MIAC	1	0–1	.000	-	-	-	-
WIAC	1	0–1	.000	-	-	-	-
