= Jean Tassy =

Haitian soccer player and manager

Personal information
- Full name: Jean-Arnaud Tassy
- Place of birth: Haiti
- Position: Midfielder

College career
Years	Team	Apps	(Gls)
1968–69	Canton Kangaroos		
1970–71	Buffalo State Bengals		

Senior career*
Years	Team	Apps	(Gls)
1971	Toronto Metros		
1972–73	New York City Cacos		

Managerial career
- 1974–1981: Niagara Purple Eagles (men's)
- 1982–1988: Buffalo State Bengals (men's)
- 1995–2007: Buffalo Bulls (women's)
- * Club domestic league appearances and goals

Jean-Arnaud Tassy is a Haitian former soccer player and head coach.

== Amateur career ==
Tassy began playing college soccer at Canton Junior College in Canton, New York, where he was a two-time All-American in 1968 and 1969. Then he was recruited by Fred Hartrick to play for Buffalo State College, where he earned Division I All-American honors his junior year. During that season, he led the Bengals to what was then the best season in school history (13–0–2), an appearance in the NCAA Tournament and a final season ranking of seventh in the nation.

== Professional career ==
Tassy was drafted by the Toronto Metros in 1971, and then played two seasons with the New York City Cacos. In 1972, he was selected as the Most Valuable Player of the Niagara Peninsula Soccer Association after scoring eight goals for the Fort Erie Kickers. Tassy was invited to play for Haiti in the 1974 FIFA World Cup, but declined due to the political climate of the country at the time.

== Coaching career ==
Tassy coached the Niagara Purple Eagles men's soccer team from 1974 until 1981, winning 47 games in those eight years, a school record until the mid-2000s. He then moved on to his alma mater, Buffalo State College, where he was head coach from 1982 through 1988 and led the Bengals' men's team to three NCAA Tournament appearances (1982, 83 and 84).

From 1995 to 2007, Tassy coached the women's team at the University at Buffalo. His most successful year as head coach was 2000, when the team finished first in the Mid-American Conference with a 16–6–1 record, a performance which garnered Tassy the conference's Coach of the Year Award.

== Recognition ==
Tassy was inducted into the Buffalo State Athletic Hall of Fame in 1988. In July 2023, Niagara University announced that he would be inducted into the school's Athletics Hall of Fame.
