= 2022–23 NCAA Division III men's ice hockey season =

- Duration: October 19, 2022– March 25, 2023
- NCAA tournament: 2023
- National championship: Raymond J. Bourque Arena; Beverly, Massachusetts
- NCAA champion: Hobart
- Sid Watson Award: Matus Spodniak (Adrian)

The 2022–23 NCAA Division III men's ice hockey season began on October 19, 2022, and concluded on March 25, 2023. This was the 50th season of Division III college ice hockey.

== Regular season ==
Alvernia played its inaugural season this year, doing so as a member of the UCHC.

=== Season tournaments ===
Tournament	Dates	Teams	Champion
Western Massachusetts Invitational	October 28–29	4	Franklin Pierce
Worcester City Cup	October 28, 30	4	Nichols
Castleton Invitational	November 25–26	4	Saint Anselm
Utica Thanksgiving Showcase	November 25–26	4	Trine, Utica
Bowdoin/Colby Tournament	November 26–27	4	Bowdoin
North Country Tournament	November 26–27	4	Hamilton, Stonehill
PAL Stovepipe	November 26–27	4	New England College
Skidmore Invitational	November 26–27	4	Skidmore
Codfish Bowl	December 29–30	4	Massachusetts–Boston
Superior Showdown	December 29–30	4	Marian
Northfield Bank Tournament	December 30–31	4	Curry
Oswego State Classic	December 30–31	4	Adrian
Middlebury Classic	December 31–January 1	4	Manhattanville
Cardinal Classic	January 6–7	4	Oswego State
Boston Landing Invitational	January 7–8	4	Nichols

=== Standings ===
2022–23 Commonwealth Coast Conference ice hockey standings
	Conference										Overall					
	GP	W	L	T	OTW	OTL	SOW	PTS	GF	GA	GP	W	L	T	GF	GA
Endicott †*	21	18	1	2	1	0	1	56	91	28	29	24	3	2	118	42
Curry	21	16	4	1	1	2	0	50	92	38	29	22	6	1	112	59
University of New England	21	16	4	1	1	0	0	48	94	41	30	21	7	2	128	72
Salve Regina	21	12	8	2	1	0	0	36	75	63	27	15	11	1	99	85
Western New England	21	5	15	1	0	2	0	18	53	89	25	6	18	1	64	106
Wentworth	21	4	16	1	1	3	1	16	39	84	26	6	19	1	53	101
Nichols	21	5	16	0	1	0	0	14	55	118	24	8	16	0	68	123
Suffolk	21	4	16	1	2	1	1	13	36	74	25	6	17	2	46	85
Championship: March 4 † indicates conference regular season champion * indicates conference tournament champions

2022–23 NCAA Division III Independent ice hockey standings
	Overall record					
	GP	W	L	T	GF	GA
Albertus Magnus	25	17	7	1	84	61
Anna Maria	23	8	13	2	73	72
Canton State	25	12	13	0	78	92
Rivier	23	7	14	2	49	71

2022–23 Massachusetts State Collegiate Athletic Conference ice hockey standings
	Conference									Overall					
	GP	W	L	T	OTW	OTL	PTS	GF	GA	GP	W	L	T	GF	GA
Plymouth State †*	18	18	0	0	1	0	53	97	37	28	23	4	1	133	60
Worcester State	18	12	5	1	0	0	37.5	69	50	25	13	11	1	86	94
Fitchburg State	18	9	6	3	1	2	32.5	65	51	25	12	10	3	83	73
Westfield State	18	6	11	1	0	2	21.5	40	65	24	10	13	1	58	85
Massachusetts–Dartmouth	18	6	11	1	0	1	20.5	51	60	26	8	16	2	71	85
Salem State	18	5	13	0	2	0	13	50	79	27	8	19	0	77	120
Framingham State	18	3	13	2	1	0	11	41	71	22	5	15	2	53	82
Championship: March 4 † indicates conference regular season champion * indicates conference tournament champions

2022–23 Minnesota Intercollegiate Athletic Conference ice hockey standings
	Conference										Overall					
	GP	W	L	T	OTW	OTL	SOW	PTS	GF	GA	GP	W	L	T	GF	GA
St. Scholastica †	16	13	1	2	2	0	1	40	76	43	27	17	7	3	109	75
Augsburg *	16	10	5	1	1	1	0	31	61	46	28	16	10	2	94	73
Saint John's	16	9	5	2	1	0	1	29	56	43	26	13	10	3	81	64
Concordia (MN)	16	9	6	1	2	0	0	26	55	50	26	12	12	2	86	82
St. Olaf	16	7	8	1	0	1	1	24	45	52	27	14	11	2	81	79
Bethel	16	5	10	1	0	4	1	21	43	45	25	10	14	1	79	66
Saint Mary's	16	7	9	0	1	0	0	20	46	54	25	11	13	1	76	94
Hamline	16	6	10	3	0	2	1	17	38	52	25	13	11	1	66	72
Gustavus Adolphus	16	1	13	2	0	2	1	8	25	60	25	3	19	3	48	93
Championship: March 4 † indicates conference regular season champion * indicates conference tournament champion

2022–23 New England Hockey Conference standings
	Conference											Overall				
	GP	W	L	T	OW	OL	PTS	GF	GA	GP		W	L	T	GF	GA
Hobart †*	18	16	2	0	0	0	48	72	19		31	29	2	0	123	37
Norwich	18	14	2	2	2	0	42	51	22		29	20	7	2	73	44
Babson	18	10	6	2	0	0	32	56	38		28	17	9	2	92	57
Elmira	18	10	7	1	0	1	32	70	47		26	13	12	1	92	70
Skidmore	18	9	7	2	1	1	29	57	53		27	16	9	2	88	69
Massachusetts–Boston	18	8	10	0	0	2	26	45	47		26	11	15	0	60	74
New England College	18	7	10	1	0	0	22	43	61		25	9	15	1	60	84
Castleton	18	7	11	0	1	0	20	44	71		25	8	17	0	60	100
Southern Maine	18	4	14	0	0	0	12	39	62		24	5	17	2	58	82
Johnson & Wales	18	1	17	0	0	0	3	32	89		25	2	22	1	51	116
Championship: March 4 † indicates conference regular season champion * indicates conference tournament champion

2022–23 New England Small College Athletic Conference ice hockey standings
	Conference									Overall					
	GP	RW	OTW	RL	OTL	T	PTS	GF	GA	GP	W	L	T	GF	GA
Wesleyan †	18	10	1	1	3	3	39.5	53	38	25	15	7	3	86	54
Trinity †	18	12	1	4	0	1	39.5	58	26	25	16	8	1	78	46
Amherst	18	10	3	3	0	2	39	49	28	25	15	6	4	61	41
Hamilton	18	10	1	4	1	2	36	53	35	25	13	10	2	68	58
Colby	18	9	1	6	1	1	31.5	54	38	26	13	11	2	69	54
Tufts	18	6	1	9	1	1	22.5	44	56	24	10	13	1	65	69
Bowdoin *	18	6	0	9	0	3	22.5	40	54	28	15	10	3	77	66
Williams	18	5	0	11	0	2	18	43	48	26	9	15	2	59	66
Middlebury	18	4	0	10	3	1	16.5	32	64	24	5	18	1	43	87
Connecticut College	18	1	1	16	0	0	5	35	74	24	5	19	0	58	89
Championship: March 5 † indicates conference regular season champion * indicates conference tournament champion

2022–23 Northern Collegiate Hockey Association standings
	Conference										Overall					
	GP	W	L	T	OTW	OTL	3/SW	PTS	GF	GA	GP	W	L	T	GF	GA
Adrian †*	18	13	4	1	1	0	1	40	98	49	32	25	5	2	180	82
Aurora	18	13	3	2	2	0	0	39	82	57	29	19	8	2	115	95
St. Norbert	18	12	5	1	0	2	0	39	69	38	28	17	9	2	102	62
Trine	18	12	6	0	1	2	0	37	66	39	28	18	9	1	101	66
MSOE	18	9	9	0	1	2	0	28	61	61	27	15	12	0	88	86
Marian	18	8	8	2	3	2	1	26	50	56	27	11	14	2	74	94
Lake Forest	18	7	8	3	2	0	2	24	63	64	27	11	12	4	93	97
Concordia (WI)	18	4	13	1	1	2	0	14	48	85	27	4	22	1	62	153
Lawrence	18	3	14	1	1	3	0	12	35	73	25	4	19	2	49	96
Finlandia	18	3	14	1	2	1	0	9	34	84	24	4	18	2	45	112
Championship: March 4 † indicates conference regular season champion * indicates conference tournament champion

2022–23 State University of New York Athletic Conference ice hockey standings
	Conference								Overall					
	GP	W	L	T	OTL	PTS	GF	GA	GP	W	L	T	GF	GA
Oswego State †	16	12	4	0	2	26	69	37	27	17	9	1	100	65
Plattsburgh State *	16	12	3	1	0	25	68	40	28	20	6	2	103	55
Geneseo State	16	11	4	1	0	23	61	31	27	18	7	2	94	51
Cortland State	16	11	5	0	0	22	64	41	26	16	9	1	105	76
Buffalo State	16	8	8	0	0	16	52	55	27	14	13	0	87	88
Fredonia State	16	5	11	0	2	12	33	69	25	7	18	0	56	101
Brockport State	16	5	11	0	0	10	38	61	25	10	15	0	74	88
Morrisville State	16	4	12	0	1	9	49	66	25	8	17	0	75	87
Potsdam State	16	3	13	0	1	7	41	75	25	5	19	1	67	114
Championship: March 4 † indicates conference regular season champion * indicates conference tournament champions

2022–23 United Collegiate Hockey Conference standings
	Conference record										Overall record					
	GP	W	L	T	OW	OL	SW	PTS	GF	GA	GP	W	L	T	GF	GA
Utica †*	20	20	0	0	2	0	0	58	123	30	29	25	3	1	165	57
Nazareth	20	14	5	1	1	0	1	43	67	41	28	18	8	2	89	60
Stevenson	20	12	6	2	1	4	2	43	86	47	27	15	10	2	111	69
Manhattanville	20	12	7	1	1	1	0	37	81	69	27	14	11	2	93	97
Wilkes	20	11	7	2	4	3	0	34	65	58	26	13	10	3	77	78
Chatham	20	11	6	3	3	0	1	34	65	59	28	14	9	3	72	103
Alvernia	20	6	13	1	1	2	1	21	58	81	26	8	16	2	72	103
Arcadia	20	5	12	3	0	0	1	19	54	90	26	6	17	3	72	119
King's	20	5	14	1	1	0	1	16	40	79	25	6	17	2	51	101
Neumann	20	4	12	1	0	0	1	14	40	77	25	6	18	1	52	97
Lebanon Valley	20	2	17	1	0	4	0	11	48	96	25	3	20	2	56	113
Championship: March 4 † indicates conference regular season champion * indicates conference tournament champions

2022–23 Wisconsin Intercollegiate Athletic Conference ice hockey standings
	Conference									Overall					
	GP	W	L	T	OTW	OTL	PTS	GF	GA	GP	W	L	T	GF	GA
Wisconsin–Stevens Point †*	15	12	2	1	2	0	35	53	26	30	20	6	4	104	54
Wisconsin–Eau Claire	15	9	5	1	3	2	28	46	39	28	18	9	1	89	71
Wisconsin–Superior	15	9	5	1	1	1	28	35	23	29	15	12	2	74	63
Wisconsin–Stout	15	6	8	1	0	1	20	35	37	29	17	11	1	94	67
Wisconsin–River Falls	15	5	9	1	1	1	17	32	40	27	11	15	1	66	72
Northland	15	1	13	1	0	2	7	25	61	27	2	23	2	45	107
Championship: March 4 † indicates conference regular season champion * indicates conference tournament champion

Note: Mini-game are not included in final standings

== PairWise Rankings ==
The PairWise Rankings (PWR) are a statistical tool designed to approximate the process by which the NCAA selection committee decides which teams get at-large bids to the 16-team NCAA tournament. Although the NCAA selection committee does not use the PWR as presented by USCHO, the PWR has been accurate in predicting which teams will make the tournament field.

For Division III men, all teams are included in comparisons starting in the 2013–14 season (formerly, only teams with a Ratings Percentage Index of .500 or above, or teams under consideration, were included). The PWR method compares each team with every other such team, with the winner of each “comparison” earning one PWR point. After all comparisons are made, the points are totaled up and rankings listed accordingly.

With 84 Division III men's teams, the greatest number of PWR points any team could earn is 83, winning the comparison with every other team. Meanwhile, a team that lost all of its comparisons would have no PWR points.

Teams are then ranked by PWR point total, with ties broken by the teams’ RPI ratings, which starting in 2013–14 is weighted for home and road games and includes a quality wins bonus (QWB) for beating teams in the top 20 of the RPI (it also is weighted for home and road).

When it comes to comparing teams, the PWR uses three criteria which are combined to make a comparison: RPI, record against common opponents and head-to-head competition. Starting in 2013–14, the comparison of record against teams under consideration was dropped because all teams are now under comparison.

NCAA Division I Men's Hockey PairWise Rankings
Rank	Team	PWR	RPI	Conference
1	Endicott	83	.6319*	CCC
2	Utica	81	.6304*	UCHC
2	Hobart	81	.6252*	NEHC
4	Curry	80	.6036*	CCC
4	Adrian	80	.6011	NCHA
6	Plattsburgh State	78	.5884*	SUNYAC
7	University of New England	77	.5863	CCC
8	Wisconsin–Stevens Point	76	.5861*	WIAC
9	Plymouth State	75	.5513	MASCAC
10	Norwich	74	.5785*	NEHC
11	Wisconsin–Eau Claire	73	.5620	WIAC
12	Oswego State	72	.5571	SUNYAC
13	Babson	71	.5533*	NEHC
14	St. Norbert	69	.5497*	NCHA
15	Geneseo State	68	.5496	SUNYAC
15	Wesleyan	68	.5492	NESCAC
17	Aurora	67	.5457*	NCHA
18	Trine	66	.5480*	NCHA
19	Augsburg	65	.5460	MIAC
20	Salve Regina	64	.5446*	CCC
21	Trinity	63	.5437	NESCAC
22	Nazareth	62	.5413	UCHC
22	Skidmore	62	.5409*	NEHC
24	Wisconsin–Stout	60	.5620	WIAC
25	Amherst	59	.5437	NESCAC
26	St. Scholastica	58	.5406	MIAC
27	Stevenson	57	.5341	UCHC
27	Albertus Magnus	57	.5292	Independent
29	Wisconsin–Superior	54	.5260	WIAC
29	Hamilton	54	.5237	NESCAC
31	Cortland State	53	.5226	SUNYAC
31	MSOE	53	.5213	NCHA
33	Saint John's	51	.5186	MIAC
34	Bowdoin	50	.5237	NESCAC
35	Colby	48	.5168	NESCAC
35	Manhattanville	48	.5152	UCHC
35	Elmira	48	.5141	NEHC
38	Chatham	46	.5078	UCHC
39	Buffalo State	45	.5061	SUNYAC
40	St. Olaf	44	.5057	MIAC
41	Wilkes	43	.5024	UCHC
42	Concordia (MN)	42	.5023	MIAC
43	Canton State	41	.4939	Independent
44	Lake Forest	40	.4930	NCHA
45	Hamline	39	.4916	MIAC
46	Wisconsin–River Falls	37	.4916	WIAC
47	Tufts	36	.4916	NESCAC
47	Bethel	36	.4916	MIAC
49	Marian	35	.4866	NCHA
50	Massachusetts–Boston	34	.4856	NEHC
51	Williams	33	.4828	NESCAC
52	Worcester State	31	.4837	MASCAC
52	Fitchburg State	31	.4822	MASCAC
54	Saint Mary's	30	.4776	MIAC
55	Western New England	29	.4719	CCC
56	New England College	28	.4712	NEHC
56	Anna Maria	28	.4647	Independent
58	Nichols	26	.4624	CCC
59	Westfield State	25	.4610	MASCAC
60	Morrisville State	24	.4603	SUNYAC
61	Wentworth	23	.4589	CCC
61	Brockport State	23	.4588	SUNYAC
63	Castleton	21	.4581	NEHC
64	Fredonia State	20	.4579	SUNYAC
65	Alvernia	19	.4557	UCHC
66	Middlebury	18	.4540	NESCAC
67	Suffolk	17	.4484	CCC
68	Massachusetts–Dartmouth	16	.4433	MASCAC
69	Arcadia	15	.4416	UCHC
70	Southern Maine	14	.4329	NEHC
71	King's	13	.4324	UCHC
72	Lawrence	12	.4308	NCHA
73	Northland	11	.4304	WIAC
74	Gustavus Adolphus	10	.4302	MIAC
75	Potsdam State	9	.4289	SUNYAC
76	Neumann	8	.4240	UCHC
77	Concordia (WI)	7	.4224	NCHA
78	Connecticut College	6	.4140	NESCAC
79	Lebanon Valley	5	.4138	UCHC
80	Salem State	4	.4129	MASCAC
81	Rivier	2	.4104	Independent
81	Framingham State	2	.4064	MASCAC
82	Finlandia	1	.4017	NCHA
82	Johnson & Wales	1	.3995	NEHC
*A team's RPI has been adjusted to remove negative effect from defeating a weak opponent Note: A team's record is based only on games against other Division III hockey schools which are eligible for the NCAA Tournament.

== 2023 NCAA Tournament ==
First round March 11
E6	Plymouth State	0
E7	University of New England	2
W2	Wisconsin–Stevens Point	2****
W3	Augsburg	1
E5	Plattsburgh State	1
E8	Norwich	2*
E4	Curry	1*
E9	Bowdoin	0

Quarterfinals; March 18
E1	Utica (1)	4
E7	University of New England	5*
W1	Adrian (4)	3*
W2	Wisconsin–Stevens Point	2
E2	Endicott (2)	3
E8	Norwich	0
E3	Hobart (3)	5
E4	Curry	1

Semifinals; March 24
E7	University of New England	7
W1	Adrian (4)	8*
E2	Endicott (2)	1
E3	Hobart (3)	3

National Championship; March 25
W1	Adrian (4)	2
E3	Hobart (3)	3*

Note: * denotes overtime period(s)

== Player stats ==
=== Scoring leaders ===
GP = Games played; G = Goals; A = Assists; Pts = Points; PIM = Penalty minutes

Player	Class	Team	GP	G	A	Pts	PIM
Matus Spodniak	Senior	Adrian	31	29	28	57	14
Arkhip Ledenkov	Junior	St. Scholastica	27	21	29	50	16
Ty Enns	Senior	Adrian	30	21	27	48	71
Carsen Richels	Junior	St. Scholastica	26	19	22	41	6
Filimon Ledenkov	Junior	St. Scholastica	26	13	28	41	14
Liam McCanney	Sophomore	Stevenson	27	23	17	40	12
Luke Aquaro	Sophomore	Hobart	27	21	18	39	12
Myles Abbate	Senior	Plymouth State	25	15	24	39	2
Henry McKinney	Senior	Nazareth	28	10	28	38	8
Ryan Kuzmich	Sophomore	University of New England	29	15	22	37	10
Mark Zhukov	Senior	Curry	29	15	22	37	10
Alessio Luciani	Senior	Adrian	25	13	24	37	10
Mic Curran	Graduate	Utica	28	12	25	37	4
Jake Fuss	Senior	University of New England	29	10	27	37	42
Jason Dobay	Senior	Utica	29	5	32	37	10

=== Leading goaltenders ===
GP = Games played; Min = Minutes played; W = Wins; L = Losses; T = Ties; GA = Goals against; SO = Shutouts; SV% = Save percentage; GAA = Goals against average

Player	Class	Team	GP	Min	W	L	T	GA	SO	SV%	GAA
Damon Beaver	Freshman	Hobart	20	1159	18	2	0	20	7	.955	1.04
Ryan Wilson	Sophomore	Endicott	14	843	11	3	0	18	4	.947	1.28
Eli Shiller	Freshman	Plattsburgh State	18	1004	12	5	0	23	3	.946	1.38
Mavrick Goyer	Freshman	Hobart	11	595	9	0	2	14	2	.932	1.41
Devon Bobak	Freshman	Trinity	19	1151	13	5	1	27	5	.934	1.41
Drennen Atherton	Senior	Norwich	22	1326	16	6	0	33	3	.944	1.49
Dylan Meilun	Freshman	Wisconsin–Superior	19	1072	12	3	2	27	6	.941	1.51
Atticus Kelly	Senior	Endicott	14	834	12	0	2	22	2	.938	1.58
Ryan Wagner	Senior	Wisconsin–Stevens Point	17	1055	11	4	1	28	2	.935	1.59
Adam Harris	Sophomore	Geneseo State	10	363	4	1	1	10	2	.938	1.65

== See also ==
- 2022–23 NCAA Division I men's ice hockey season
- 2022–23 NCAA Division II men's ice hockey season
