= 2023 NCAA Division III men's ice hockey tournament =

- Teams: 12
- Finals site: Raymond J. Bourque Arena, Beverly, Massachusetts
- Champions: Hobart (1st title)
- Runner-up: Adrian (3rd title game)
- Semifinalists: University of New England (2nd Frozen Four); Endicott (1st Frozen Four)
- Winning coach: Mark Taylor (1st title)
- MOP: Damon Beaver (Hobart)
- Attendance: 812 (final)

The 2023 NCAA Division III Men's Ice Hockey Tournament was the culmination of the 2022–23 season, the 38th such tournament in NCAA history. Hobart defeated defending champion Adrian 3–2 in overtime to win the program's first national championship.

== Qualifying teams ==
Before the season, the NCAA amended its bylaws, lowering the requirement for conferences to receive automatic qualifiers from seven conference members to six. This meant that the WIAC champion would now be guaranteed a spot in the tournament field.

Twelve teams qualified for the tournament in the following ways: (Pool A) nine teams received bids as a result of being conference tournament champions from conferences that possessed an automatic bid, (Pool C) three additional teams received at-large bids based upon their records.

East							West						
Seed	School	Conference	Record	Berth Type	Appearance	Last Bid	Seed	School	Conference	Record	Berth Type	Appearance	Last Bid
1	Utica (1)	UCHC	25–2–1	Tournament Champion	4th	2022	1	Adrian (4)	NCHA	23–4–2	Tournament Champion	11th	2022
2	Endicott (2)	CCC	22–2–2	Tournament Champion	3rd	2020	2	Wisconsin–Stevens Point	WIAC	19–5–4	Tournament Champion	16th	2019
3	Hobart (3)	NEHC	26–2–0	Tournament Champion	12th	2022	3	Augsburg	MIAC	16–9–2	Tournament Champion	8th	2022
4	Curry	CCC	21–5–1	At-Large	5th	2011							
5	Plattsburgh State	SUNYAC	20–5–2	Tournament Champion	20th	2017							
6	Plymouth State	MASCAC	23–3–1	Tournament Champion	6th	2022							
7	University of New England	CCC	19–6–2	At-Large	4th	2022							
8	Norwich	NEHC	19–6–2	At-Large	20th	2020							
9	Bowdoin	NESCAC	14–9–3	Tournament Champion	7th	2014							

== Format ==
The tournament featured four rounds of play. All rounds were single-game elimination.

The top four rated teams received byes into the quarterfinal round and were arranged so that if they were to advance to the semifinals, the first seed would play the fourth seed and the second seed would play the third seed. Because there were three western teams and only one received a bye into the quarterfinals, all three were placed into the same bracket. Of the nine eastern teams, the six that did not receive byes were arranged so that the fourth eastern seed played the ninth eastern seed with the winner advancing to play the third eastern seed; the fifth eastern seed played the eighth eastern seed with the winner advancing to play the second eastern seed; and the sixth eastern seed played the seventh eastern seed with the winner advancing to play the first eastern seed. The higher-seeded team played host in all first round and quarterfinal matches.

== Bracket ==
First round March 11
E6	Plymouth State	0
E7	University of New England	2
W2	Wisconsin–Stevens Point	2****
W3	Augsburg	1
E5	Plattsburgh State	1
E8	Norwich	2*
E4	Curry	1*
E9	Bowdoin	0

Quarterfinals; March 18
E1	Utica (1)	4
E7	University of New England	5*
W1	Adrian (4)	3*
W2	Wisconsin–Stevens Point	2
E2	Endicott (2)	3
E8	Norwich	0
E3	Hobart (3)	5
E4	Curry	1

Semifinals; March 24
E7	University of New England	7
W1	Adrian (4)	8*
E2	Endicott (2)	1
E3	Hobart (3)	3

National Championship; March 25
W1	Adrian (4)	2
E3	Hobart (3)	3*

Note: * denotes overtime period(s)

== Results ==
=== First round ===
March 11, 2023; 7:00 PM	(E6) Plymouth State	0 – 2 (0–0, 0–0, 0–2)	(E7) University of New England	Plymouth State University Ice Arena – Holderness, New Hampshire; Attendance: 1,145

Game reference
Brendahn Brawley	Goalies	Billy Girard	Referees: Ronald Morello; Matthew Hallock; Linesmen: Patrick Sharron; Kevin McManus
0–1 / 47:38 – Ryan Kuzmich (15) (Fuss, Sheehy); 0–2 / 59:38 – EN – Chad Merrell (1) (Sciucco, DiScanio)			Referees: Ronald Morello; Matthew Hallock; Linesmen: Patrick Sharron; Kevin McManus
4 min	Penalties	4 min	Referees: Ronald Morello; Matthew Hallock; Linesmen: Patrick Sharron; Kevin McManus
28	Shots	25	Referees: Ronald Morello; Matthew Hallock; Linesmen: Patrick Sharron; Kevin McManus

March 11, 2023; 9:00 PM	(W2) Wisconsin–Stevens Point	2 – 1 (4OT) (0–1, 1–0, 0–0, 0–0, 0–0, 0–0, 1–0)	(W3) Augsburg	K.B. Willett Arena – Stevens Point, Wisconsin; Attendance: 1,662

Game reference

Ryan Wagner
Goalies
Samuel Vyletelka
Referees:
Adam Knutson
Eric Thorn
Linesmen:
Jason Peters
Cody Koemptgen

	0–1	13:11 – PP – Erik Palmqvist (11) (Chladek, Reichenbacher)
(Heneghan, Hill) Cody Moline (5) – 30:15	1–1
(Moline, Moberg) David Hill (6) – 129:27	2–1

12 min
Penalties
14 min
74
Shots
48

March 11, 2023; 7:00 PM	(E5) Plattsburgh State	1 – 2 (OT) (0–0, 1–0, 0–1, 0–1)	(E8) Norwich	Ronald B. Stafford Ice Arena – Plattsburgh, New York; Attendance: 2,577

Game reference

Eli Shiller
Goalies
Drennen Atherton
Referees:
Chris Shepley
Trevor Waite
Linesmen:
Ryan Merrimack
Rick Urnek

(Thomas, Belgrave) Jake Lanyi (8) – 37:59	1–0
	1–1	40:40 – Philip Elgstam (9) (Chladek, Reichenbacher)
	1–2	69:54 – Callum Jones (2) (Thibodeau, Doggett)

0 min
Penalties
0 min
30
Shots
40

March 11, 2023; 7:00 PM	(E4) Curry	1 – 0 (OT) (0–0, 0–0, 0–0, 1–0)	(E9) Bowdoin	Canton Ice House – Canton, Massachusetts; Attendance: 603

Game reference
Reid Cooper	Goalies	Alexander Kozic	Referees: Kenneth Gates; Matthew Fuller; Linesmen: Steven Riley Jr. Patrick Philbin
(Kent, Galassi) Mark Zhukov (13) – 71:02 / 1–0			Referees: Kenneth Gates; Matthew Fuller; Linesmen: Steven Riley Jr. Patrick Philbin
2 min	Penalties	8 min	Referees: Kenneth Gates; Matthew Fuller; Linesmen: Steven Riley Jr. Patrick Philbin
49	Shots	37	Referees: Kenneth Gates; Matthew Fuller; Linesmen: Steven Riley Jr. Patrick Philbin

=== Quarterfinals ===
March 18, 2023; 7:00 PM	(E1) Utica	4 – 5 (OT) (0–0, 1–3, 3–1, 1–0)	(E7) University of New England	Utica University Nexus Center – Utica, New York; Attendance: 3,978

Game reference

Bryan Landsberger
Goalies
Billy Girard
Referee:
Matthew Terreri
Linesmen:
Matthew Fuller
Anthony Perez

(Larsson, Zapata) Buster Larsson (10) – PP – 25:53	1–0
	1–1	26:11 – SH – Anthony Sciucco (7) (Merrell)
	1–2	30:15 – PP – Garrett Devine (10) (Heinold, Courtmanche)
	1–3	34:16 – Kevin O'Keefe (1) (Devine, Winslow)
	1–4	40:45 – Logan DiScanio (7) (Szretter, Winslow)
(Cavanagh, Moncovich) Justin Allen (5) – 45:52	2–4
Brandon Osmundson (8) – 57:31	3–4
(Fedorek, Zapata) Buster Larsson (11) – 58:13	4–4
	4–5	65:00 – Anthony Sciucco (8) (Winslow, Discanio)

4 min
Penalties
6 min
62
Shots
28

March 18, 2023; 7:00 PM	(W1) Adrian	3 – 2 (OT) (1–1, 1–1, 0–0, 1–0)	(W2) Wisconsin–Stevens Point	Arrington Ice Arena – Adrian, Michigan; Attendance: 1,259

Game reference

Nic Tallarico
Goalies
Ryan Wagner
Referees:
Shane Dillon
Eric Thom
Linesmen:
Trenton Gerew
David Sell

(Shields) Alessio Luciani (11) – 04:48	1–0
	1–1	16:01 – PP – Andrew Poulias (14) (Sciarrino, Heneghan)
(Enns, Spodniak) Alessio Luciani (12) – PP – 22:19	2–1
	2–2	26:42 – Dawson Sciarrino (8) (Anderson, Gonrowski)
(Enns, Shields) Matus Spodniak – (28) – PP – 69:38	3–2

6 min
Penalties
10 min
36
Shots
39

March 18, 2023; 7:00 PM	(E2) Endicott	3 – 0 (0–0, 0–0, 3–0)	(E8) Norwich	Raymond J. Bourque Arena – Beverly, Massachusetts; Attendance: 1,200

Game reference

Atticus Kelly
Goalies
Drennen Atherton
Referee:
Ronald Morello
Linesmen:
Douglas Place
Patrick Philbin

(Sterrett, Kurapov) Ryan Willett (8) – 43:26	1–0
(Self, Amsley) Noah Strawn (8) – 57:30	2–0
(Martinelli, Ring) Cameron Speck (4) – 57:49	3–0

4 min
Penalties
2 min
39
Shots
25

March 18, 2023; 7:00 PM	(E3) Hobart	5 – 1 (0–0, 3–1, 2–0)	(E4) Curry	Geneva Recreation Complex – Geneva, New York; Attendance: 580

Game reference

Damon Beaver
Goalies
Reid Cooper
Referees:
Derek Sylvester
Matthew Hallock
Linesmen:
Dan Barreca
Cameron Goebert

	0–1	28:56 – PP – Tarek Paranica (8) (Pitts, Vonakis)
(Aquaro, Wuth) Brenden Howell (6) – 36:50	1–1
(Buzoverya) Cooper Swift (2) – 37:13	2–1
(Howell, Crane) Kahlil Fontana (2) – 37:25	3–1
(Tyson) Tanner Daniels (10) – 43:38	4–1
Ignat Belov (11) – EN – 59:47	5–1

2 min
Penalties
4 min
35
Shots
18

=== Semifinals ===
March 24, 2023; 3:00 PM	(W1) Adrian	8 – 7 (OT) (2–1, 1–4, 4–2, 1–0)	(E7) University of New England	Raymond J. Bourque Arena – Beverly, Massachusetts; Attendance: 610

Game reference

Nic Tallarico
Dershahn Stewart
Goalies
Billy Girard
Referees:
Matthew Hallock
Ed Moberg
Linesmen:
Patrick Philbin
Robert Griffin

(Enns, Babiak) Jake Suede (7) – 03:50	1–0
(Shields) Riley Murphy (17) – 13:53	2–0
	2–1	16:10 – PP – Garrett Devine (11) (Heinold, Courtmanche)
	2–2	21:09 – PP – Alex Sheehy (3) (DiScanio, Courtmanche)
	2–3	22:17 – Dawson Ellis (3) (Fuss, Christy)
	2–4	26:17 – Chad Merrell (2) (Kuzmich, Devine)
	2–5	30:26 – Collin Heinold (6) (Fuss, Merrell)
(Murphy, Wendt) Bradley Somers (7) – 34:55	3–5
(Spodniak, Shields) Ty Enns (19) – PP – 40:45	4–5
Ryan Pitoscia (13) – SH – 47:52	5–5
(Suede, Heintz) Ty Enns (20) – 50:06	6–5
	6–6	45:00 – Daniel Winslow (17)
	6–7	45:51 – Jared Christy (13) (Fuss)
(Somers) Ryan Pitoscia (14) – 58:51	7–7
(Enns, Shields) Alessio Luciani (13) – PP – 66:34	8–7

6 min
Penalties
19 min
44
Shots
35

March 24, 2023; 7:00 PM	(E2) Endicott	1 – 3 (0–0, 1–1, 0–2)	(E3) Hobart	Raymond J. Bourque Arena – Beverly, Massachusetts; Attendance: 1,110

Game reference

Ryan Wilson
Goalies
Damon Beaver
Referee:
Matthew Terreri
Linesmen:
Matthew Fuller
Dan Barreca

Jackson Sterrett (13) – 24:34	1–0
	1–1	32:59 – Brenden Howell (7) (Wuth, Buzoverya)
	1–2	53:09 – PP – Austin Mourar (4) (Shell, Swift)
	1–3	59:21 – EN – Luke Aquaro (20) (Wuth, Swift)

12 min
Penalties
8 min
26
Shots
26

=== National Championship ===
March 25, 2023; 7:00 PM	(W1) Adrian	2 – 3 (OT) (1–2, 0–0, 1–0, 0–1)	(E3) Hobart	Raymond J. Bourque Arena – Beverly, Massachusetts; Attendance: 812

Game reference

Nic Tallarico
Goalies
Damon Beaver
Referees:
Matt Fuller
Matt Terreri
Linesmen:
Dan Barecca
Cam Goebert

	0–1	07:24 – Shane Shell (4) (Aquaro, Alexander)
	0–2	11:23 – Luke Aquaro (21)
(Rehding, Luciani) Ty Enns (21) – PP – 12:19	1–2
(Rehding, Luciani) Matus Spodniak (29) – 54:30	2–2
	2–3	74:56 – Wil Crane (5) (Lassman, Burke)

6 min
Penalties
6 min
39
Shots
35

== All-Tournament Team ==
- G: Damon Beaver* (Hobart)
- D: Austin Mourar (Hobart)
- D: Jaden Shields (Adrian)
- F: Luke Aquaro (Hobart)
- F: Wil Crane (Hobart)
- F: Ty Enns (Adrian)

* Most Outstanding Player(s)

== Record by conference ==
Conference	# of Bids	Record	Win %	Quarterfinals	Frozen Four	Championship Game	Champions
CCC	3	4–3	.571	3	2	-	-
NEHC	2	4–1	.800	2	1	1	1
MASCAC	1	0–1	.000	-	-	-	-
MIAC	1	0–1	.000	-	-	-	-
NCHA	1	2–1	.667	1	1	1	-
NESCAC	1	0–1	.000	-	-	-	-
SUNYAC	1	0–1	.000	-	-	-	-
UCHC	1	0–1	.000	1	-	-	-
WIAC	1	1–1	.500	1	-	-	-
