= Koeppel Community Center =

Ice hockey arena in Hartford, Connecticut

- Koeppel Community Sports Center
- Interactive map of Koeppel Community Center
- Location: 175 New Britain Ave. Hartford, Connecticut, 06114
- Coordinates: 41.7439648°N 72.687887°W
- Owner: Trinity College
- Operator: Trinity College
- Capacity: Ice Hockey: 3,400
- Surface: Ice
- Field size: 200 x 90 ft.

Construction
- Groundbreaking: November 6, 2005
- Opened: November 17, 2006
- Cost: $15.5 million

Tenants
- Trinity Bantams (men's and women's ice hockey) (2006–present)

The Koeppel Community Center is an indoor ice hockey arena on the campus of Trinity College in Hartford, Connecticut. It is home to the Trinity Bantams men's and women's ice hockey programs and has seating for 3,400 spectators.

== History ==
In 1998, the Connecticut Bonding Commission approved $2 million to fund the building of a new ice rink in downtown Hartford. While the funding was a necessary first step, the final cost of the rink would far exceed the sum from the state. Six years later, a group of several entities, including Trinity College held fundraising drives to raise the additional money required. a little over 15 months later, the ground breaking ceremony was held on a plot of land just across the street from Trinity's main campus. A year later, the doors opened for the Koeppel Community Sports Center.

Up to that time, Trinity's ice hockey teams had to use other local rinks and had most recently been hosted at the Oxford Rink in West Hartford. Initially, the venue had seating for 1,200 with an additional 300 bleacher seats available. Shortly after opening, however, the arena was criticized by some as not living up to its name and failing to serve the local community as a whole. Within two years, Trinity purchased a removable floor that can be placed over the rink and allow the building to be used for multiple other pursuits. Additionally, seating arrangements were expanded to hold up to 3,400 spectators.

The rink is dedicated in honor of Albert C. Williams '64.

Sporting positions
Preceded by Raymond J. Bourque Arena	Host of the Division III men's Frozen Four; 2024	Succeeded by TBD
