= Raymond J. Bourque Arena =

Ice hockey arena in Beverly, Massachusetts

- Interactive map of Raymond J. Bourque Arena
- Location: 300 Hale St. Beverly, Massachusetts, 01915
- Coordinates: 42.5569°N 70.8474°W
- Owner: Endicott College
- Operator: Endicott College
- Capacity: Ice Hockey: 1,000
- Surface: Ice
- Field size: 200x85 ft.

Construction
- Groundbreaking: July 29, 2014
- Built: September 2015
- Opened: October 6, 2015
- Cost: $10 million

Tenants
- Endicott Gulls (men's and women's ice hockey) (2015–present)

The Raymond J. Bourque Arena is an ice hockey arena on the campus of Endicott College in Beverly, Massachusetts. It is home to the Endicott Gulls men's and women's ice hockey programs. The first hockey game was on November 7, 2015, with women's team taking on Johnson & Wales. The total capacity for hockey games is 1,000.

== History ==
Endicott had played club hockey for a decade before securing the necessary funds to build an on-campus arena. The school held a groundbreaking ceremony on July 29, 2014, announcing that the rink would be dedicated to long time Boston Bruins player and Hockey Hall of Famer, Ray Bourque. While Bourque did not have any formal connection to the school at the time, he was a 30-year resident of the North Shore and had been an exemplary player during his time in the NHL.

With their state-of-the-art facility, the Endicott men's program swiftly rose to become a prominent team in Division III hockey. As the Gulls were the top remaining team for the 2023 Frozen Four, the arena was used as the site for the semifinal and championship rounds.

Sporting positions
Preceded by Herb Brooks Arena	Host of the Division III men's Frozen Four; 2023	Succeeded by Koeppel Community Center
