= State University of New York at Canton =

Public college in Canton, New York, US

- Former name: List: School of Agriculture at St. Lawrence University (1906–1941); New York State Agricultural and Technical Institute (1941–1965); State University of New York Agricultural and Technical College at Canton (1965–1987)
- Motto: Great Majors, Great Careers
- Type: Public college
- Established: 1906; 120 years ago
- Parent institution: State University of New York
- Endowment: $14.1 million (2019)
- President: Zvi Szafran
- Undergraduates: 2,845 (fall 2025)
- Location: Canton, New York, U.S. 44°36′12″N 75°11′00″W
- Campus: 555 acres (225 ha)
- Colors: Blue, green, gold
- Nickname: Kangaroos
- Sporting affiliations: SUNYAC (NCAA Div III)
- Mascot: Roody
- Website: canton.edu

The State University of New York at Canton (SUNY Canton) is a public college in Canton, New York, United States. It is part of the State University of New York. The college offers bachelor's degrees, associate degrees, and certificate programs.

== History ==
Founded in 1906 as the "School of Agriculture (SOA) at St. Lawrence University", SUNY Canton was the first postsecondary, two-year college authorized by the New York State Legislature. In 1941, SOA was renamed the "New York State Agricultural and Technical Institute" (ATI). ATI became a member college of the State University of New York in 1948. To recognize advanced technology programs added in the 1950s and 1960s, the college underwent another name change in 1965, this time becoming the State University of New York Agricultural and Technical College at Canton (ATC). In 1987, the SUNY Board of Trustees authorized yet another name change to the college's present designation as the State University of New York College of Technology at Canton.

In 1997, SUNY Canton received bachelor's degree granting approval from the SUNY Board of Trustees and the Governor of New York State.

== Academics ==
Since SUNY Canton offers certificates, associates degrees, and bachelor's degrees, students in many disciplines may pursue a "ladder curriculum," allowing them to first earn a certificate or associates degree and then proceed to the next level. SUNY Canton confers degrees through three academic schools: the School of Business & Liberal Arts, the Canino School of Engineering Technology, and the School of Science, Health & Criminal Justice.

=== Special programs ===
The university offers cross-registration with St. Lawrence University, Clarkson University, and SUNY Potsdam as members of the Associated Colleges of the St. Lawrence Valley. A two-and-two program in environmental science and forestry and a one-and-one program in Forest Technology are offered in conjunction with the State University of New York College of Environmental Science and Forestry. In both programs students begin taking general education classes at SUNY Canton prior to transferring to SUNY ESF to take environmental and forestry classes and complete the degree programs. Students interested in pursuing a master's degree in accountancy (MS), health services administration (MS), and technology management (MBA) have the opportunity to do so through agreements with Clarkson University. The college is also home to the David Sullivan-St. Lawrence County Law Enforcement Academy and the SUNY Canton Corrections Academy.

Students enrolled in SUNY Canton's Center for Criminal Justice, Intelligence and Cybersecurity can enroll in University at Albany's College of Emergency Preparedness, Homeland Security and Cybersecurity (CEHC) and will lead directly to a Master of Science in Information Science degree. The other leads into a Master of Arts in Criminal Justice degree offered through UAlbany's School of Criminal Justice.

An agreement with the University at Buffalo Law School allows students in Legal Studies or Applied Psychology to complete their law degree in six years, with three years at SUNY Canton and three years with University at Buffalo.

=== Accreditation ===
The university is accredited by the Middle States Commission on Higher Education. Specific programs at the university are also accredited by appropriate discipline-specific accreditors:

- ABET
- Accreditation Commission for Education in Nursing, Inc.
- American Board of Funeral Service Education
- American Physical Therapy Association
- American Veterinary Medical Association
- Commission on Sport Management Accreditation (COSMA)
- International Accreditation Council for Business Education
- National Automotive Technicians Education Foundation

== Campus ==
Cook Hall is home to the School of Science, Health and Criminal Justice. The facility includes mortuary science facilities, science labs, and the Early Childhood classrooms. In 2012, a fire damaged part of the Cook Hall. In 2003 the university opened the 12,000-square-foot (1,100 m^{2}) Newell Veterinary Technology Center. The building houses SUNY Canton's veterinary science programs and includes veterinary labs, classroom and conference space. The SUNY Canton Canino School of Engineering and Technology is located inside the Nevaldine Technology Center In addition to the engineering technology and information technology programs, the facility also includes space for the automotive, building trades, and HVAC programs.

MacArthur Hall, formerly known as the Faculty Office Building, is located near the center of campus and is connected to many of the other academic buildings on campus. It was named after President Emeritus Earl W. MacArthur The School of Business & Liberal Arts is located inside the building as well as many of the faculty and administrative offices. The building also includes one of the various on-campus dining options, Roos Court.

The Richard W. Miller Campus Center is the heart of the SUNY campus. The $12 million building opened in 2002, replacing the Kingston Theatre which suffered extensive fire damage in 1997. The Miller Campus Center contains student activity offices, conference spaces study and relaxation areas lounge space the Campus Center Store, on-campus post office, Health Center, dining center, and a gym for student recreational and intramural activities.

Southworth Library is the academic library for SUNY Canton. It houses college archives, a coffee shop known as the Cyber Cafe, the university's print and digital media collections for use by students for research and recreation. The collection includes over 65,000 volumes, 300 periodical subscriptions and 1,500 video and audio recordings. Students also have access to over 25 electronic information research databases.

=== Residence life ===
SUNY Canton currently has five residence halls: Kennedy, Heritage, Mohawk, Rushton, and Smith. They are located along the Grasse River in the north-central portion of the campus. Kennedy Hall is a housing option offering apartment-style living for upper classmen. Features include a multi-purpose classroom and meeting space, and a large open courtyard for recreation and outdoor activities. Chaney Dining Center is the main dining hall on the campus; it is located near the residence halls and serves both resident and commuter students.

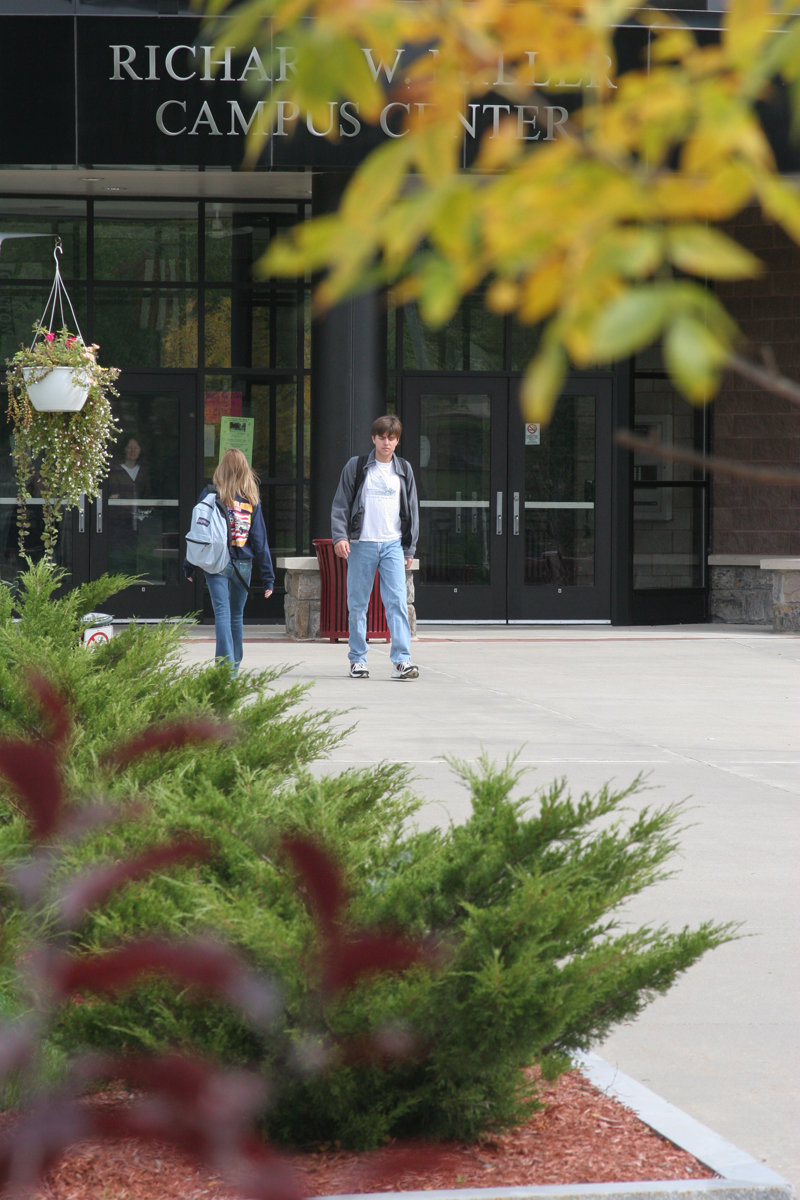
Richard W. Miller Campus Center

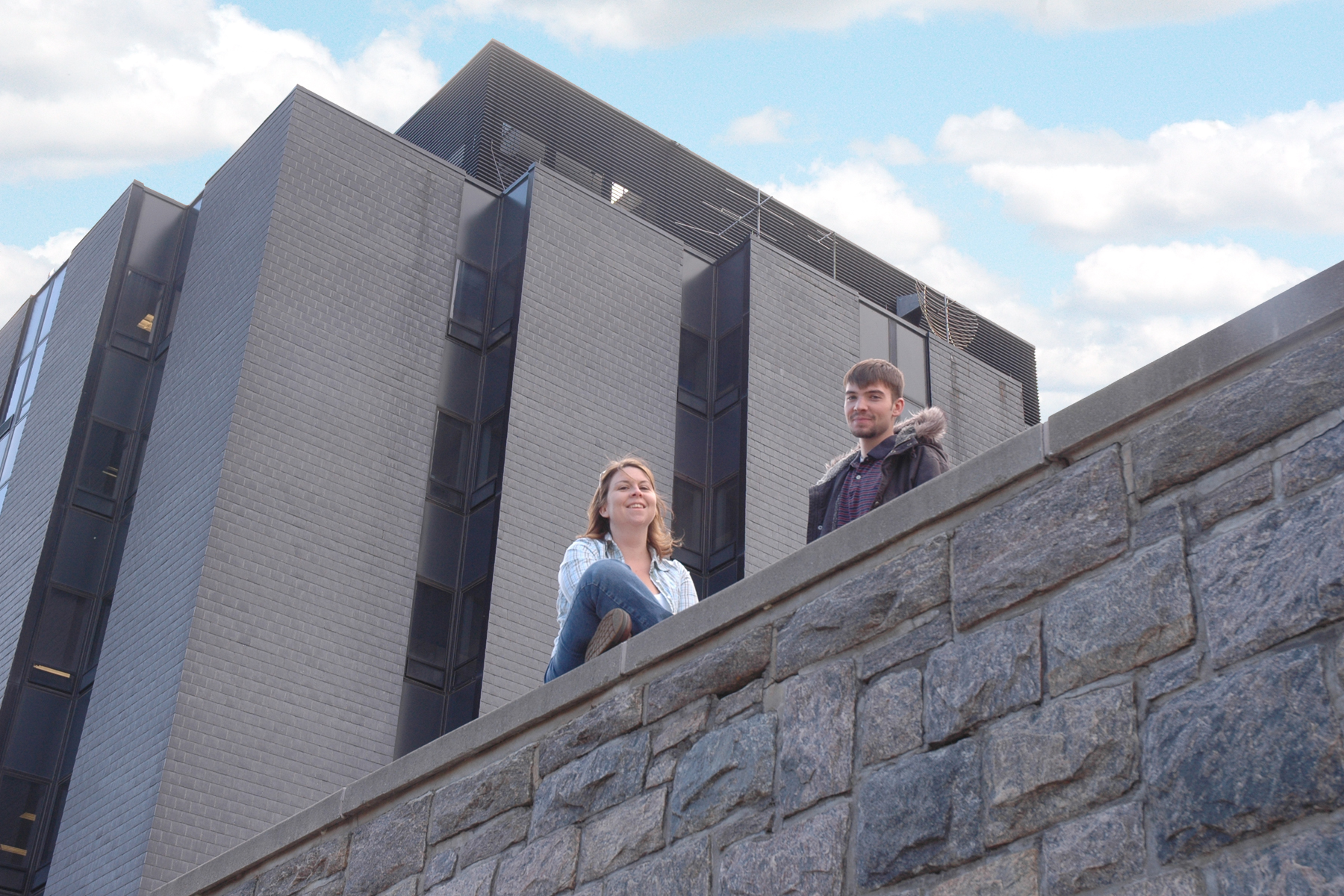
Faculty Office Building

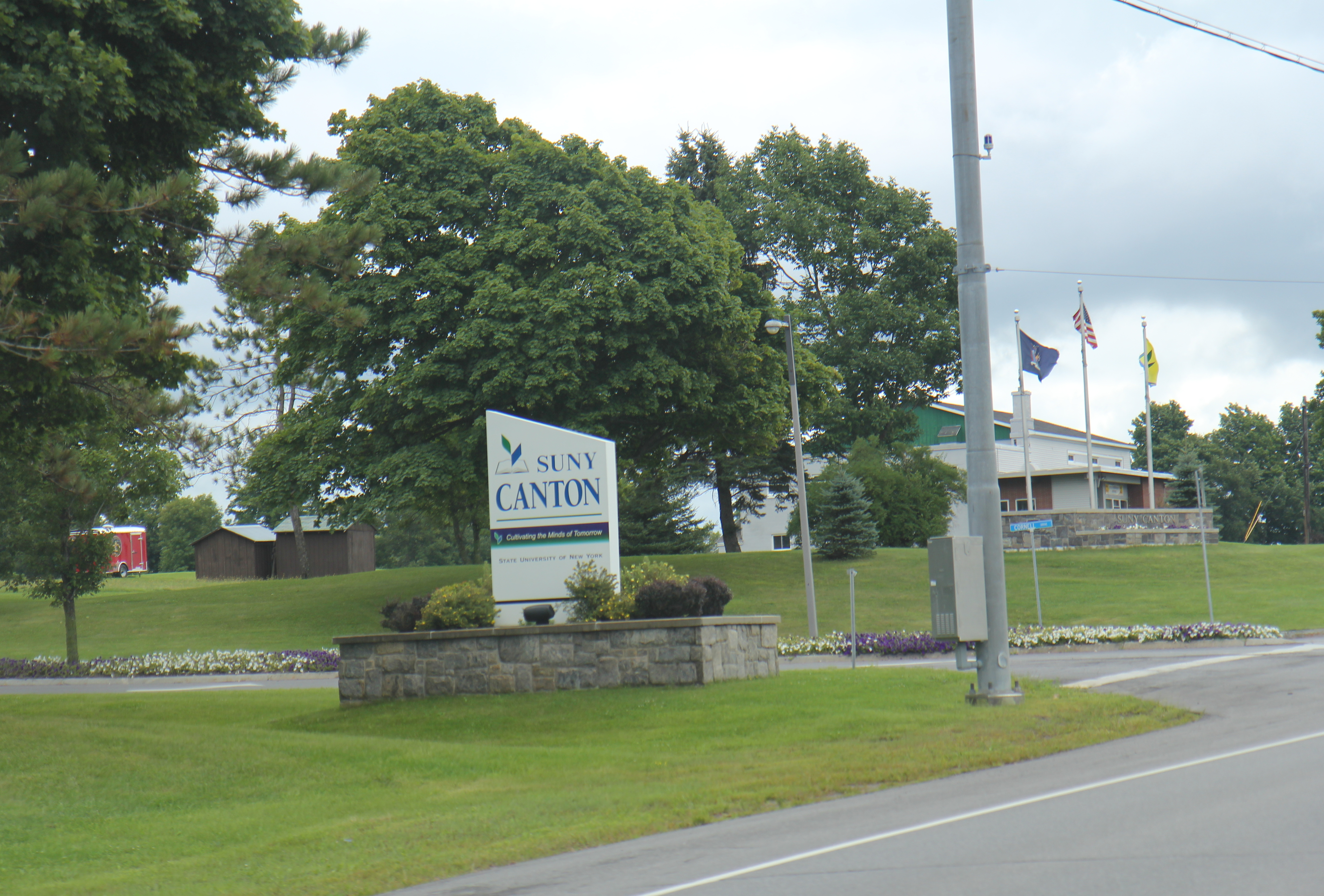
Entrance

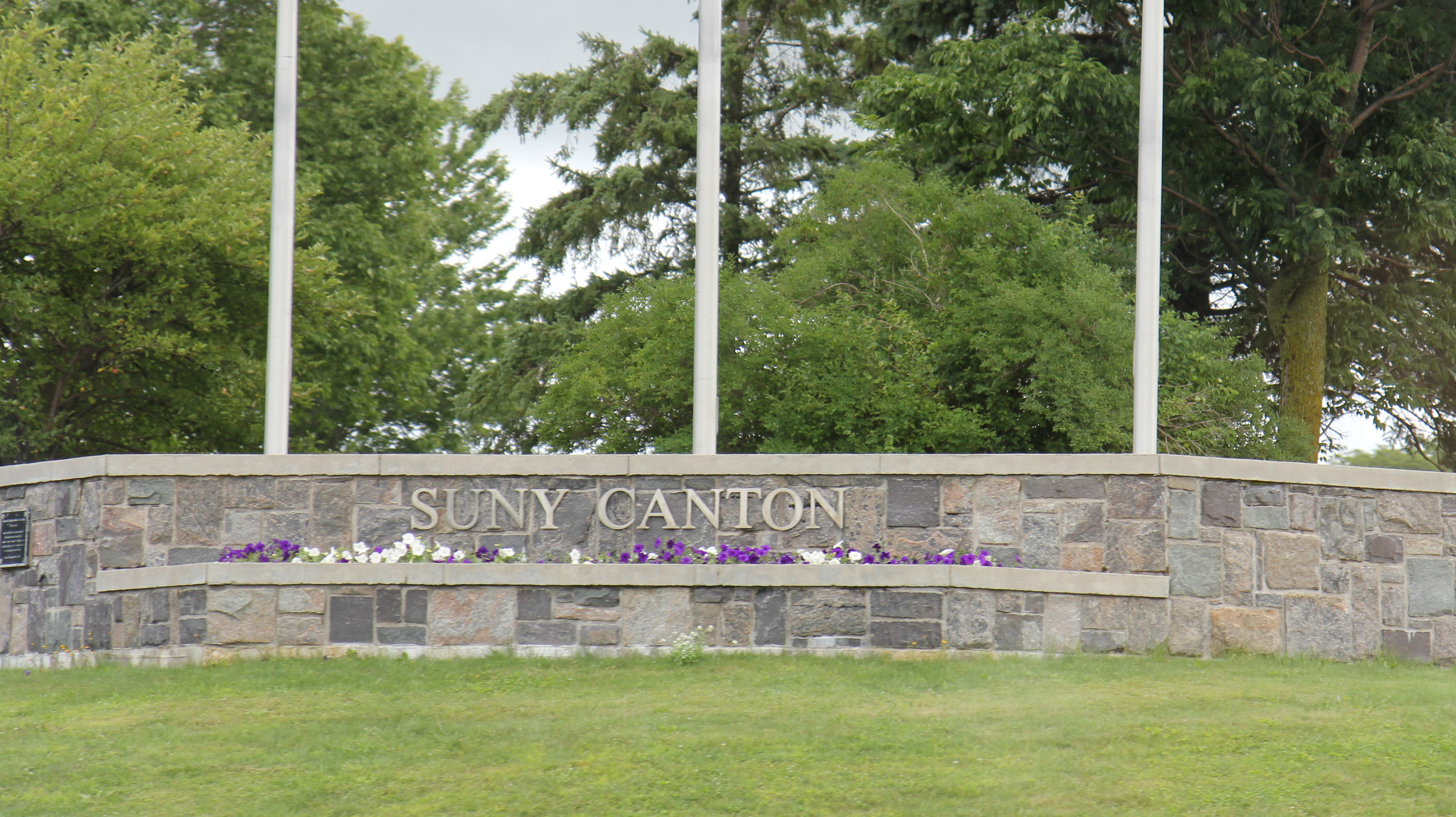
Sign at the entrance

== Athletics ==
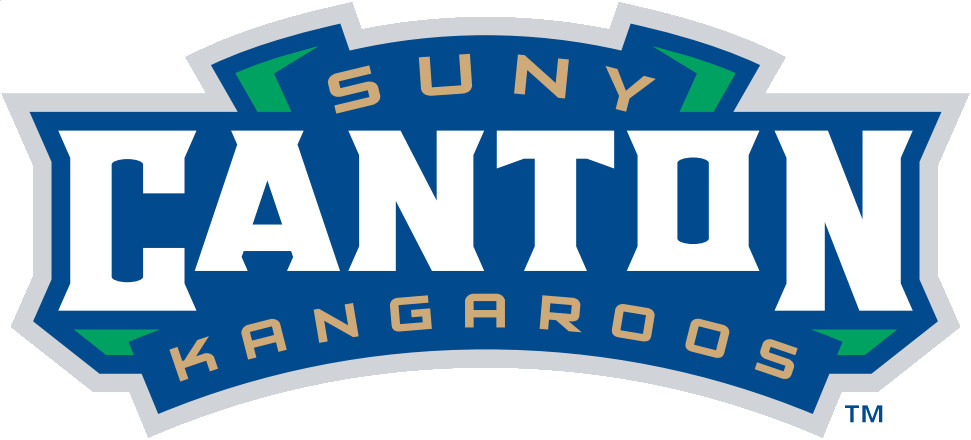
SUNY Canton athletics logo

The SUNY Canton athletic teams are called the Kangaroos (often shortened to Roos). They were previously known as the Northstars until 2007. The college is a member of the NCAA Division III ranks, primarily competing in the North Atlantic Conference (NAC) since 2018–19 the academic year. The Kangaroos previously competed in the short-lived D-III American Collegiate Athletic Association (ACAA) during the 2017–18 school year; as an NCAA D-III Independent from 2011–12 to 2016–17 (while held provisional status until 2014–15); and the Sunrise Conference of the National Association of Intercollegiate Athletics (NAIA) from 2004–05 to 2010–11.

SUNY Canton competes in 17 intercollegiate varsity sports: Men's sports include baseball, basketball, cross country, golf, ice hockey, lacrosse and soccer; while women's sports include basketball, cross country, golf, ice hockey, lacrosse, soccer, softball and volleyball; and co-ed sports include cheerleading and esports.

=== History ===
SUNY Canton was a member of the NAIA from 2004 to 2011 after transitioning from the National Junior College Athletic Association (NJCAA) as the school moved from a two-year college to a four-year comprehensive university.

In June 2015, the college was approved for full membership status in the NCAA Division III.

=== Athletics expansion ===
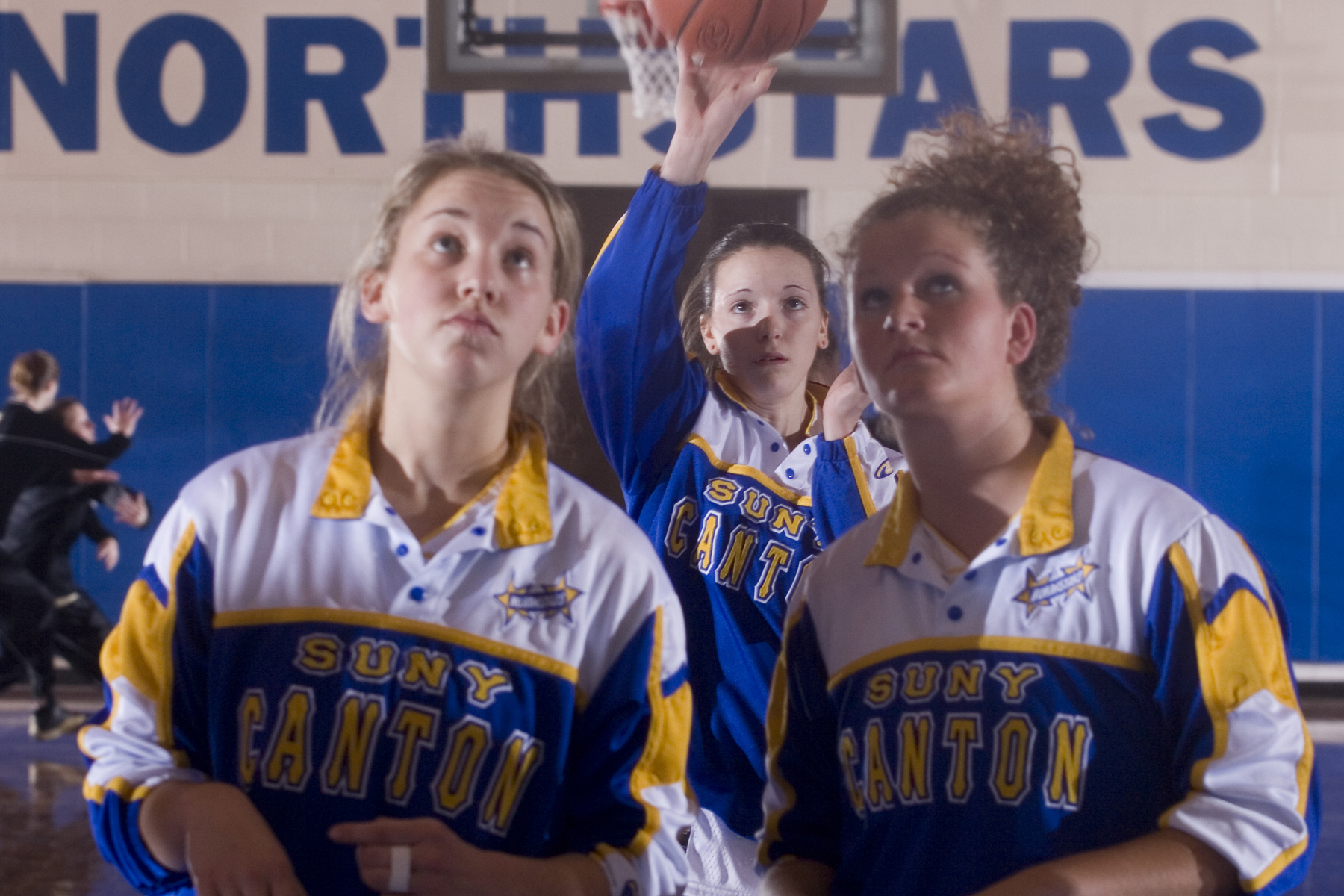
Women's basketball players in 2007

The university announced an expansion of athletics starting in the 2011–12 academic year. In 2011, SUNY Canton added men's golf and men's and women's lacrosse, in addition to reinstating its women's volleyball program. The university added women's ice hockey in the 2012–13 academic year and the team has played in the Northeast Women's Hockey League (NEWHL) conference since the 2019–20 season. SUNY Canton also added a women's golf team in 2015.

In 2018 SUNY Canton announced it will begin competing nationally in coed Esports. The college became the first New York State team to join the National Association of Collegiate Esports (NACE) and the first varsity esports program in the State University of New York system. Esports teams currently play competitively in the Eastern College Athletic Conference (ECAC) and the SUNY Esports League. The Overwatch and FIFA teams captured ECAC championship titles in 2018.

In 2019, SUNY Canton Athletics announced the addition of varsity cheerleading.

=== Ice hockey ===
The SUNY Canton men's ice hockey program began in the mid-1960s and has won 15 NJCAA National Championships in: 1973, 1974, 1975, 1976, 1978, 1979, 1981, 1982, 1983, 1987, 1989, 1992, 1996, 1997, and 2000. The team currently competes in the Division III (NCAA) level as it was awarded independent status with eventual admittance into the SUNY conference. In its second season as a member of the ACHA, the Roos reached the 2010 ACHA Division I National Tournament before falling to Penn State 3–7 in the first round. The Roos won their second straight ECHL regular season championship and first ever conference playoff championship in 2011. The team also made a second straight appearance in the ACHA DI Championship.

The SUNY Canton men's hockey program is set to join the State University of New York Athletic Conference (SUNYAC) as an associate member in the 2024–25 season. The Northeast Women's Hockey League (NEWHL), which currently includes SUNY Canton women's hockey, will transition to the SUNYAC in the upcoming 2023–24 season.

=== Athletic facilities ===
The school completed a new Convocation, Athletic and Recreation Center, otherwise known as "CARC" and nicknamed "Roos House" in 2011. The facility features several athletic courts, an ice arena, a pool and a fitness center, along with office and student spaces.

== Student life ==
Undergraduate demographics as of Fall 2023
Race and ethnicity	Total
White	65%
Black	11%
Hispanic	11%
Two or more races	4%
Asian	3%
Unknown	3%
American Indian/Alaska Native	2%
International student	2%
Economic diversity
Low-income (Note: The percentage of students who received an income-based federal Pell grant intended for low-income students.)	49%
Affluent (Note: The percentage of students who are a part of the American middle class at the bare minimum.)	51%

Students participate in several clubs and organizations under the umbrella of the student government known as the Student Government Association (SGA) with staff support from the Student Activities Involvement and Leadership office. Intramural and recreational activities are also available. SUNY Canton does not have a college newspaper.

== Notable people ==
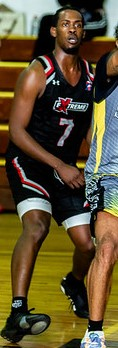
Quran DuBois

=== Alumni ===
- Emmanuel Akah, former football player
- Doug Hoffman, businessman
- Dave LaRock, former member of the Virginia House of Delegates
- Jean Tassy, former soccer player and coach
- Mark Taylor, hockey coach
- Don Vaughan, former hockey player and coach

=== Faculty ===
- Farhad Fatkullin, professor
- Caroline McCaw, professor
- John G. A. O'Neil, professor
- Mark Raymond, football coach
- Lou Saban, football coach
- Nevada Smith, basketball coach
