= Conference of New England men's ice hockey tournament =

American college ice hockey tournament

- Conference hockey championship
- Sport: Ice hockey
- Conference: Conference of New England
- Format: Single-elimination
- Played: 2017–present

The Conference of New England men's ice hockey tournament began in 2017 with eight of the ten teams qualifying for the postseason. The field was reduced to 6 teams beginning in 2019. The 2021 tournament was cancelled due to the COVID-19 pandemic. The 2022 season saw the tournament briefly change to an 8-team format before returning to its 6-team arrangement.

== 2017 ==
Seed	School	Conference Record	Seed	School	Conference Record
1	Endicott	14–3–2	5	University of New England	9–7–2
2	Nichols	11–3–4	6	Johnson & Wales	6–9–3
3	Salve Regina	11–4–3	7	Becker	5–12–1
4	Curry	11–5–2	8	Western New England	5–12–1

Quarterfinals; February 25
1	Endicott	8
8	Western New England	3
2	Nichols	3
7	Becker	1
(Pairings are reseeded after the first round)
3	Salve Regina	3
6	Johnson & Wales	4
4	Curry	2
5	University of New England	4

Semifinals; March 1
1	Endicott	4
6	Johnson & Wales	2
2	Nichols	3
5	University of New England	6

Championship; March 4
1	Endicott	5
5	University of New England	4

Note: * denotes overtime period(s)

== 2018 ==
Seed	School	Conference Record	Seed	School	Conference Record
1	Salve Regina	14–2–2	5	Nichols	9–6–3
2	Endicott	13–4–1	6	Wentworth	7–8–3
3	University of New England	11–4–3	7	Suffolk	6–10–2
4	Curry	11–6–1	8	Western New England	4–12–2

Quarterfinals; February 17
1	Salve Regina	8
8	Western New England	1
2	Endicott	10
7	Suffolk	2
(Pairings are reseeded after the first round)
3	University of New England	6
6	Wentworth	3
4	Curry	3
5	Nichols	4

Semifinals; February 24
1	Salve Regina	4
5	Nichols	5
2	Endicott	1
3	University of New England	4

Championship; March 3
5	Nichols	8
3	University of New England	3

Note: * denotes overtime period(s)

== 2019 ==
Seed	School	Conference Record	Seed	School	Conference Record
1	Salve Regina	13–3–1	4	Nichols	9–6–2
2	Curry	11–4–2	5	Endicott	9–8–0
3	University of New England	11–5–1	6	Wentworth	6–10–1

The championship game was played at the Portsmouth Abbey in Portsmouth, Rhode Island.

Quarterfinals; February 20
3	University of New England	5
6	Wentworth	1
4	Nichols	3
5	Endicott	4*

Semifinals; February 23
1	Salve Regina	1
5	Endicott	0
2	Curry	1
3	University of New England	2

Championship; March 2
1	Salve Regina	2
3	University of New England	6

Note: * denotes overtime period(s)

== 2020 ==
Seed	School	Conference Record	Seed	School	Conference Record
1	University of New England	14–2–2–0–0–2	4	Salve Regina	10–7–1–1–1–0
2	Endicott	16–2–0–2–0–0	5	Nichols	8–8–2–1–2–1
3	Curry	12–4–2–2–0–1	6	Wentworth	3–12–3–0–2–1

Quarterfinals; February 26
3	Curry	1
6	Wentworth	2
4	Salve Regina	4
5	Nichols	5*

Semifinals; February 29
1	University of New England	1
6	Wentworth	2
2	Endicott	3*
5	Nichols	2

Championship; March 7
6	Wentworth	0
2	Endicott	2

Note: * denotes overtime period(s)

== 2022 ==
Seed	School	Conference Record	Seed	School	Conference Record
1	University of New England	17–3–1–1–0–1	5	Suffolk	7–10–4–0–1–2
2	Endicott	15–5–1–0–1–0	6	Nichols	6–15–0–0–1–0
3	Salve Regina	14–5–2–2–0–2	7	Wentworth	4–15–2–1–2–1
4	Curry	13–7–1–1–1–0	8	Western New England	2–18–1–1–0–0

Quarterfinals; February 26
1	University of New England	4
8	Western New England	1
2	Endicott	6
7	Wentworth	1
(Pairings are reseeded after the first round)
3	Salve Regina	1
6	Nichols	3
4	Curry	2
5	Suffolk	1

Semifinals; March 2
1	University of New England	4
6	Nichols	1
2	Endicott	2*
4	Curry	1

Championship; March 5
1	University of New England	3*
2	Endicott	2

Note: * denotes overtime period(s)

== 2023 ==
Seed	School	Conference Record	Seed	School	Conference Record
1	Endicott	18–1–2–1–0–1	4	Salve Regina	12–8–2–1–0–0
2	Curry	16–4–1–1–2–0	5	Western New England	5–15–1–0–2–0
3	University of New England	16–4–1–1–0–0	6	Wentworth	4–16–1–1–3–1

Quarterfinals; February 22
3	University of New England	3
6	Wentworth	1
4	Salve Regina	5
5	Western New England	2

Semifinals; February 25
1	Endicott	5
4	Salve Regina	4
2	Curry	5
3	University of New England	1

Championship; March 4
1	Endicott	6
2	Curry	0

Note: * denotes overtime period(s)

== 2024 ==
Seed	School	Conference Record	Seed	School	Conference Record
1	Curry	15–3–0–1–0–0	4	Salve Regina	10–6–2–1–2–1
2	Endicott	12–3–3–2–2–1	5	Wentworth	6–11–1–1–0–1
3	University of New England	10–4–4–3–1–2	6	Nichols	4–10–4–1–2–1

Quarterfinals; February 21
3	University of New England	6
6	Nichols	3
4	Salve Regina	4
5	Wentworth	2

Semifinals; February 24
1	Curry	2
4	Salve Regina	7
2	Endicott	3*
3	University of New England	2

Championship; March 2
4	Salve Regina	1
2	Endicott	2

Note: * denotes overtime period(s)

=== Quarterfinals ===
==== (3) University of New England vs. (6) Nichols ====
February 21	University of New England	6 – 3	Nichols	Harold Alfond Forum
04:29 – Garrett Devine (7); 18:01 – Garrett Devine (8)		First period	No scoring
02:34 – Anthony Cinato (5); 03:47 – Anthony Cinato (6)		Second period	Quinn McCarthy (4) – 13:59; Gabe Temple (4) – pp – 17:28
11:18 – Nate Chickering (6); 18:16 – en – Tyler Healey (2)		Third period	Gabe Temple (5) – 18:47
Billy Girard (17 saves / 20 shots)		Goalie stats	Tyler Bost (30 saves / 35 shots)

==== (4) Salve Regina vs. (5) Wentworth ====
February 21	Salve Regina	4 – 2	Wentworth	Howard Rink
No scoring		First period	Nikolas Sombrowski (6) – pp – 03:04
07:09 – Logan Calder (10)		Second period	Dane Probe (3) – 08:34
00:20 – Joesph Kile (5); 15:06 – Walter Baumann (8); 19:25 – en – Seth Benson (10)		Third period	No scoring
Cayden Bailey (16 saves / 18 shots)		Goalie stats	Jack McGovern (39 saves / 42 shots)

=== Semifinals ===
==== (1) Curry vs. (4) Salve Regina ====
February 24	Curry	2 – 7	Salve Regina	Canton Ice House
05:07 – Killian Rowlee (10); 18:34 – pp – Matt Connor (5)		First period	Hoon Kim (3) – 04:52; Jonathan Hammel (5) – 05:33; Damon Zimmer (3) – 19:21
No scoring		Second period	Karsten Kruska (3) – 03:12
No scoring		Third period	Walter Baumann (9) – sh – 04:59; Parker Mabbett (5) – 09:29; Seth Benson (11) – 11:00
Shane Soderwall (20 saves / 27 shots); Oscar Wahlgren (11 saves / 11 shots)		Goalie stats	Cayden Bailey (35 saves / 37 shots)

==== (2) Endicott vs. (3) University of New England ====
February 24	Endicott	3 – 2	OT	University of New England	Raymond J. Bourque Arena
No scoring		First period		No scoring
No scoring		Second period		No scoring
15:41 – Kevin Craig (6); 19:34 – Jimmy McIsaac (5)		Third period		Jayden Price (9) – 08:47; Anthony Cinato (7) – 18:36
09:27 – Jimmy McIsaac (6)		First overtime period		No scoring
Atticus Kelly (37 saves / 39 shots)		Goalie stats		Billy Girard (39 saves / 42 shots)

=== Finals ===
==== (2) Endicott vs. (4) Salve Regina ====
March 2	Endicott	2 – 1	Salve Regina	Raymond J. Bourque Arena
05:49 – Cassidy Bowes (9)		First period	No scoring
19:03 – Andrew Kurapov (11)		Second period	Damon Zimmer (4) – 06:54
No scoring		Third period	No scoring
Atticus Kelly (32 saves / 33 shots)		Goalie stats	Cayden Bailey (28 saves / 30 shots)

== 2025 ==
Seed	School	Conference Record	Seed	School	Conference Record
1	Curry	16–2–0–0–1–0	4	Suffolk	7–9–2–0–2–2
2	University of New England	14–4–0–0–1–0	5	Nichols	5–9–4–1–0–0
3	Endicott	14–3–1–5–1–0	6	Wentworth	5–12–1–1–1–1

Quarterfinals; February 26
3	Endicott	3*
6	Wentworth	2
4	Suffolk	4
5	Nichols	0

Semifinals; March 1
1	Curry	4
4	Suffolk	2
2	University of New England	3
3	Endicott	4*

Championship; March 8
1	Curry	5
3	Endicott	2

Note: * denotes overtime period(s)

=== Quarterfinals ===
==== (3) Endicott vs. (6) Wentworth ====
February 26	Endicott	3 – 2	OT	Wentworth	Raymond J. Bourque Arena
00:31 – Ryan Willett (9)		First period		Alex Walicki (5) – pp – 15:48
No scoring		Second period		No scoring
18:36 – Michael Casey (4)		Third period		George Kolovos (8) – en – 15:38
10:07 – Cade Baker (2)		First overtime period		No scoring
Atticus Kelly (22 saves / 23 shots)		Goalie stats		Jack McGovern (67 saves / 70 shots)

==== (4) Suffolk vs. (5) Nichols ====
February 26	Suffolk	4 – 0	Nichols	Porrazzo Skating Rink
16:39 – Daniel McKiernan (6)		First period	No scoring
07:14 – Ralph Berry (3)		Second period	No scoring
02:02 – Ralph Berry (4); 15:53 – Nolan Leonard (3)		Third period	No scoring
C.J. Hapward (46 saves / 46 shots)		Goalie stats	Liam Choquette (25 saves / 29 shots)

=== Semifinals ===
==== (1) Curry vs. (4) Suffolk ====
March 1	Curry	4 – 2	Suffolk	Canton Ice House
06:04 – Karim Gayfullin (8); 09:52 – pp – Karim Gayfullin (9)		First period	Nolan Leonard (4) – 18:55
01:39 – Gage Dill (6); 16:56 – Karim Gayfullin (10)		Second period	No scoring
No scoring		Third period	Gavin Havens (4) – pp – 16:49
Shane Soderwall (16 saves / 18 shots)		Goalie stats	C.J. Hapward (24 saves / 28 shots)

==== (2) University of New England vs. (3) Suffolk ====
March 1	University of New England	3 – 4	OT	Endicott	Harold Alfond Forum
No scoring		First period		Domenic Garozzo (15) – 19:09
11:39 – pp – Juraj Eliáš (6); 14:20 – Juraj Eliáš (7)		Second period		No scoring
02:13 – Cam Bergeman (8)		Third period		Jackson Sterrett (6) – 03:29; Michael Casey (5) – 18:51
No scoring		First overtime period		Michael Casey (6) – 00:58
Stefan Carney (32 saves / 36 shots)		Goalie stats		Atticus Kelly (28 saves / 31 shots)

=== Finals ===
==== (1) Curry vs. (3) Suffolk ====
March 8	Curry	5 – 2	Endicott	Canton Ice House
14:41 – Matt Connor (3)		First period	No scoring
10:38 – Grady Friedman (10)		Second period	Primo Self (14) – 08:11
01:21 – Manny Cabral (9); 14:41 – sh – J.P. Moreira (1); 16:42 – sh – en – Karim Gayfullin (11)		Third period	Cade Baker (3) – pp – 19:01
Shane Soderwall (38 saves / 40 shots)		Goalie stats	Atticus Kelly (27 saves / 31 shots)

== 2026 ==
Seed	School	Conference Record	Seed	School	Conference Record
1	University of New England	17–3–0–0–0–0	4	Curry	13–6–1–0–0–0
2	Endicott	14–3–3–0–1–1	5	Nichols	7–12–1–0–0–0
3	Suffolk	15–4–1–1–0–0	6	Johnson & Wales	6–12–2–0–1–2

Quarterfinals; February 25
3	Suffolk	8
6	Johnson & Wales	1
4	Curry	1
5	Nichols	4

Semifinals; February 28
1	University of New England	10
5	Nichols	0
2	Endicott	4
3	Suffolk	1

Championship; March 7
1	University of New England	1
2	Endicott	2

Note: * denotes overtime period(s)

=== Quarterfinals ===
==== (3) Suffolk vs. (6) Johnson & Wales ====
February 25	Suffolk	8 – 1	Johnson & Wales	Porrazzo Skating Rink
07:01 – Joe O'Brien (6); 08:05 – Jakob Grace (4); 19:27 – Joe O'Brien (7)		First period	Zachary Brady (5) – pp – 10:09
03:57 – Daniel McKiernan (14)		Second period	No scoring
05:10 – Quinn Booth (3); 05:50 – pp – Aidan O'Connell (14); 14:11 – pp – Dimitri Voyatzis (5); 18:32 – pp – Daniel McKiernan (15)		Third period	No scoring
Austin McNicholas (24 saves / 25 shots)		Goalie stats	Jake Inzirillo (41 saves / 49 shots)

==== (4) Curry vs. (5) Nichols ====
February 25	Curry	1 – 4	Nichols	Canton Ice House
13:58 – Andrew Morton (6)		First period	Justin Massa (6) – 13:21
No scoring		Second period	Gavin Duckworth (4) – 13:30
No scoring		Third period	Aaron Hamel (5) – pp – 10:40; Alexis Trudeau (6) – en – 16:48
Thomas Heaney (17 saves / 20 shots)		Goalie stats	Ryan Henry (42 saves / 43 shots)

=== Semifinals ===
==== (1) University of New England vs. (5) Nichols ====
February 28	University of New England	10 – 0	Nichols	Harold Alfond Forum
01:29 – Dom Murphy (10)		First period	No scoring
02:17 – Aidan Curran (3); 09:24 – Kevin O'Keefe (3); 12:00 – pp – Drew Olivieri (15); 14:31 – Drew Olivieri (16)		Second period	No scoring
00:41 – pp – Ryan Hadland (9); 03:50 – Drew Olivieri (17); 05:16 – Juraj Eliáš (11); 06:20 – Drew Olivieri (18); 13:38 – Isaac Keller (5)		Third period	No scoring
Harrison Chesney (15 saves / 15 shots)		Goalie stats	Ryan Henry (21 saves / 25 shots); Nick Anderson (4 saves / 9 shots); Liam Choquette (2 saves / 3 shots)

==== (2) Endicott vs. (3) Suffolk ====
February 28	Endicott	4 – 1	Suffolk	Raymond J. Bourque Arena
13:11 – Anthony Cafarelli (12)		First period	No scoring
No scoring		Second period	Ryan Webb (4) – 18:50
10:10 – sh – Michael Casey (7); 11:59 – Collin Kleiser (5); 18:53 – en – Noah Gibbs (12)		Third period	No scoring
Peter Sterling (27 saves / 28 shots)		Goalie stats	Austin McNicholas (21 saves / 24 shots)

=== Finals ===
==== (1) University of New England vs. (2) Endicott ====
March 7	University of New England	1 – 2	Endicott	Harold Alfond Forum
No scoring		First period	No scoring
No scoring		Second period	Noah Gibbs (13) – 01:00; Noah Gibbs (14) – 17:53
12:40 – pp – Drew Olivieri (19)		Third period	No scoring
Harrison Chesney (20 saves / 22 shots)		Goalie stats	Peter Sterling (24 saves / 25 shots)

== Championships ==
School	Championships
Endicott	5
University of New England	2
Curry	1
Nichols	1

== See also ==
ECAC 2 Tournament
ECAC Northeast Tournament
