= Terry Meagher =

Canadian ice hockey player and coach

Biographical details
- Born: Belleville, Ontario, Canada
- Education: Boston University

Playing career
- 1973–1976: Boston University
- Position: Forward

Coaching career (HC unless noted)
- 1978–1979: Williams (assistant)
- 1979–1983: Clarkson (assistant)
- 1983–2016: Bowdoin

Head coaching record
- Overall: 542–253–58 (.669)
- Tournaments: 2–8 (.200)

Accomplishments and honors

Awards
- 1986 Edward Jeremiah Award; 1989 Edward Jeremiah Award

Terry Meagher (muh-HAR) is a Canadian retired ice hockey forward and coach who was twice named as the Division III National Coach of Year.

== Career ==
Meagher began attending Boston University in 1972 but was unable to make the varsity ice hockey roster until his junior season. That year, head coach Leon Abbott was fired for a second instance of recruiting violations and was replaced by his assistant Jack Parker. Parker's first four years with the team resulted in BU winning the ECAC Tournament each year, and making the NCAA Tournament. Meagher was an integral part of those teams, finishing in the top four in team scoring each year.

In his senior season, Meagher was named team captain and led the team both in goals (30) and points (55). Meagher led the team to a 1st-place finish in the ECAC standings for the first time in five years, but the team was still unable to get out of the semifinals, having lost their third consecutive opening game.

After graduating, Meagher matriculated to Illinois State University and earned a Master's degree in 1977. A year later he returned to college hockey, becoming an assistant at Williams before jumping up to division I with a similar job at Clarkson. Meagher helped the Golden Knights to a resurgence in the early-80's, winning back-to-back conference championships. In 1983 Meagher received his first head coaching job when Sid Watson, the long-time bench boss at Bowdoin, retired.

Meagher finished with a stellar record in his first season, going 19–6–1 and finishing as the runner up for the ECAC 2 Tournament. Ordinarily, Bowdoin would have likely received an invitation to the NCAA Tournament, however, the NESCAC, Bowdoin's primary conference, had rules that forbade any of its members from participating in national tournaments.

The following year almost the entire Division II membership dropped down to Division III and ECAC 2, Bowdoin's conference, was formally split with the Polar Bears now belonging to ECAC East. After a down year, the Bear returned in force in 1986, finishing first in the conference standings and winning the conference tournament. Meagher received the Edward Jeremiah Award for the quick turnaround and kept the Polar Bears as one of the top teams in Division III college hockey. Meagher received his second national coach of the year award in 1989 when Bowdoin tied Merrimack, who were about to jump up to D–I.

The Bears were typically one of the best teams in ECAC East but it was during the 1992–93 season that Meagher produced one of his best coaching efforts. The Bears were the last team in the conference tournament and faced a dominant Middlebury squad in the quarterfinals, but the defense held and limited the Panthers to a single goal. The win propelled Bowdoin into the semifinals where they held #3 Connecticut to one goal as well, and they finished off their tournament with a championship victory over Salem State.

The following year the NESCAC changed its policy to allow member teams to participate in one postseason tournament. Bowdoin finished with a good record but decided that it wasn't strong enough to earn a bid to the NCAA Tournament and participated in their conference tournament. The next season saw a similar result from the Bears but Meagher team also saw its first Sid Watson Award winner when Charlie Gaffney was named as the National Player of the Year. In 1996 Bowdoin finished the regular season with a record of 18–5–1 and took a gamble by passing on the ECAC East tournament. They were joined by Middlebury and Colby in the gambit and, miraculously, all three teams received invitations to the 1996 NCAA Tournament. Bowdoin ended up drawing the short straw and the team had to travel west to play Wisconsin–River Falls on the road. Their defense faltered, allowing seven goals in both games and they lost the series rather badly. In 1997 Bowdoin nearly pulled off another upset in the ECAC East Tournament by making the finals as a seven seed, but the team fell on hard time afterward, failing to win a postseason game for the remainder of the decade.

In 1999 the NESCAC dropped it postseason prohibition entirely and teams were now able to participate in both the conference and national tournaments. At the same time, the NESCAC also began to sponsor ice hockey as a conference sport and Bowdoin was a founding member of the ice hockey division. Middlebury was the dominant power in the early years of the new conference but Bowdoin managed to receive an at-large bid in 2002. Unfortunately, the team was outclassed by Norwich, being shut out in both games and being knocked out in the quarterfinal round. Bowdon continued to finish with excellent records in the '00s and made three consecutive conference finals from '05 to '07. The Polar Bears won their first regular season title in 2007 but without a tournament championship they weren't able to make it back to the national tournament.

2010 saw Bowdoin finish with the most wins in 15 years and, despite another runner-up result in the conference tournament, Bowdoin finally received its third at-large bid. The team was given the fifth eastern seed and had to play the #2 overall team, Oswego State, on the road. Bowdoin's third trip was as successful as their previous two, losing 2–9 and being knocked out in the quarterfinals. The following year Bowdoin dropped to third in conference (tied) but the team went on tear in the postseason to capture their first ever NESCAC Tournament Championship and their first conference title since 1993. Bowdoin again received the 5th eastern seed, but this time the team earned their first tournament victory with a 2–1 win over Neumann. Unfortunately, Bowdoin was again unable to escape the quarterfinals when they met Oswego for a rematch, despite the game finishing much closer with a 5–7 loss.

Meagher pushed the Polar Bears to the best season in program history in 2012–13. The Polar Bears won the NESCAC regular season championship, NESCAC Tournament championship and won their second NCAA Tournament game. The team finished with a 23–4–2 record, setting a program record for wins and finishing with the second-best winning percentage for a program that dates back to 1919. Meagher got the team to its sixth national tournament the following year, but they had to face Oswego again and were still unable to overcome the Lakers. That season Meagher became the 6th Division III coach to win his 500th game.

Meagher coached for two more seasons before retiring with a record of 542–253–58 (.669). As of 2019 he was 21st on the all time wins list for college men's ice hockey and was 9th in terms of winning percentage for coaches with at least 400 victories.

== Personal ==
Meagher's two younger brothers Rick and Tony both played hockey at Boston University. Tony helped BU win the national championship in 1978 and was drafted by the St. Louis Blues while Rick played 11 seasons in the NHL, winning the Selke Trophy as the league's best defensive forward in 1990.

== Statistics ==
=== Regular season and playoffs ===
			Regular season					Playoffs
Season	Team	League	GP	G	A	Pts	PIM	GP	G	A	Pts	PIM
1973–74	Boston University	ECAC Hockey	31	18	24	42	8	—	—	—	—	—
1974–75	Boston University	ECAC Hockey	32	26	19	45	12	—	—	—	—	—
1975–76	Boston University	ECAC Hockey	29	30	25	55	20	—	—	—	—	—
NCAA totals			92	74	68	142	40	—	—	—	—	—

== College head coaching record ==
Record table
Season	Team	Overall	Conference	Standing	Postseason
Bowdoin Polar Bears (ECAC 2) (1983–1984)
1983–84	Bowdoin	19–6–1	12–3–1	4th	ECAC 2 Runner–Up
Bowdoin:		19–6–1	12–3–1		
Bowdoin Polar Bears (ECAC East) (1983–1984)
1984–85	Bowdoin	13–12–1	9–8–1	7th	ECAC East Semifinals
1985–86	Bowdoin	22–5–0	17–2–0	1st	ECAC East Champions
1986–87	Bowdoin	21–5–0	17–3–0	2nd	ECAC East Semifinals
1987–88	Bowdoin	19–8–0	15–6–0	3rd	ECAC East Runner–Up
1988–89	Bowdoin	21–4–1	17–2–1	T–1st	ECAC East Runner–Up
1989–90	Bowdoin	16–8–2	12–4–2	3rd	ECAC East Semifinals
1990–91	Bowdoin	11–12–2	8–11–2	8th	ECAC East Quarterfinals
1991–92	Bowdoin	15–10–0	14–8–0	5th	ECAC East Quarterfinals
1992–93	Bowdoin	16–8–2	13–8–2	7th	ECAC East Champions
1993–94	Bowdoin	18–5–3	12–3–2	T–1st	ECAC East Runner–Up
1994–95	Bowdoin	19–5–2	12–4–1	T–2nd	ECAC East Runner–Up
1995–96	Bowdoin	18–7–1	15–3–1	3rd	NCAA Quarterfinals
1996–97	Bowdoin	15–12–0	11–8–0	T–7th	ECAC East Runner–Up
1997–98	Bowdoin	13–10–2	11–6–2	T–6th	ECAC East Quarterfinals
1998–99	Bowdoin	9–12–3	4–10–3	T–13th	
Bowdoin:		246–123–19	187–86–17		
Bowdoin Polar Bears (NESCAC) (1999–2016)
1999–00	Bowdoin	17–5–2	12–3–2	3rd	NESCAC Quarterfinals
2000–01	Bowdoin	14–10–1	11–6–0	5th	NESCAC Semifinals
2001–02	Bowdoin	18–6–3	14–2–3	2nd	NCAA Quarterfinals
2002–03	Bowdoin	13–6–5	11–3–5	4th	NESCAC Quarterfinals
2003–04	Bowdoin	16–8–0	12–6–0	T–3rd	NESCAC Quarterfinals
2004–05	Bowdoin	17–6–3	11–5–3	4th	NESCAC Runner–Up
2005–06	Bowdoin	17–7–3	10–6–3	T–3rd	NESCAC Runner–Up
2006–07	Bowdoin	16–7–3	11–6–2	T–1st	NESCAC Runner–Up
2007–08	Bowdoin	17–7–0	13–6–0	T–2nd	NESCAC Quarterfinals
2008–09	Bowdoin	11–12–2	8–9–2	6th	NESCAC Quarterfinals
2009–10	Bowdoin	19–7–1	14–4–1	1st	NCAA Quarterfinals
2010–11	Bowdoin	19–8–1	11–7–1	T–3rd	NCAA Quarterfinals
2011–12	Bowdoin	16–6–3	12–3–3	2nd	NESCAC Semifinals
2012–13	Bowdoin	23–4–2	13–3–2	1st	NCAA Quarterfinals
2013–14	Bowdoin	17–9–2	9–8–1	5th	NCAA First Round
2014–15	Bowdoin	14–8–3	8–7–3	5th	NESCAC Quarterfinals
2015–16	Bowdoin	13–8–4	9–5–4	3rd	NESCAC Quarterfinals
Bowdoin:		277–124–38	189–89–35		
Total:		542–253–58			
National champion Postseason invitational champion Conference regular season champion Conference regular season and conference tournament champion Division regular season champion Division regular season and conference tournament champion Conference tournament champion

== See also ==
- List of college men's ice hockey coaches with 400 wins

Awards and achievements
Preceded by Rick Meagher	ECAC Hockey Most Outstanding Player in Tournament; 1976	Succeeded by Rick Meagher
Preceded by Rob Riley; Glenn Thomaris	Edward Jeremiah Award; 1986; 1989	Succeeded by Tony Mariano; Bill Beaney
