= Glenn Thomaris =

American ice hockey coach

Current position
- Team: Elmira Mammoth

Biographical details
- Born: Potsdam, New York, U.S.
- Education: Clarkson University

Playing career
- 1974–1977: Clarkson
- Position: Forward

Coaching career (HC unless noted)
- 1978–1982: Potsdam State (assistant)
- 1982–1984: Northwood School
- 1984–1987: Clarkson (assistant)
- 1987–2001: Elmira
- 2001–2007: Potsdam State
- 2013–2016: Elmira Jackals (assistant)
- 2022–present: Elmira Mammoth

Head coaching record
- Overall: 316–198–23 (.610)
- Tournaments: 8–12–2 (.409)

Accomplishments and honors

Awards
- 1988 Edward Jeremiah Award; 1991 Edward Jeremiah Award

Glenn Thomaris is an American ice hockey coach who was twice named as the NCAA Division III coach of the year. He is the current head coach of the Elmira Mammoth of the Federal Prospects Hockey League.

== Career ==
Thomaris played parts of three seasons for Clarkson. In his final year he helped the team finish atop the ECAC Hockey standings but the team fell in the conference semifinals and missed out on a berth into the NCAA Tournament. After graduating in 1977, Thomaris returned home and joined the coaching staff at Potsdam State a year later. The Bears were playing just their third season and saw little success early on. However, in 1981 the team posted its first non-losing season and nearly repeated the feat the next season. After four years with the team, Thomaris left to become the head coach at Northwood School.

In 1984, Thomaris returned to his alma mater as an assistant coach He helped the Golden Knights produce three winning seasons before being offered his second head coaching job. In 1987, Brian McCutcheon left Elmira to take the top job at Cornell and Thomaris was chosen as his replacement. In his very first season, Thomaris led the team to a program record 27-win season and reached the 1988 championship game. He was named as the Division III coach of the year for the tremendous season. After a small decline in year two, Thomaris had the Eagles return to the national tournament for five consecutive years, winning at least 20 games each time. He got Elmira back into the Frozen Four twice more and tied his own wins record in 1991. The team flagged in the mid-90s and, while they only had one losing season, Elmira made just one NCAA appearance over a seven-year period.

In 2001, Thomaris left Elmira and returned to Potsdam. A year later he was behind the bench at Potsdam State, this time as the head coach. On the ice, the wins decreased each season and Thomaris decided to resign and return home to his family in Elmira after the 2007 season.

Thomaris returned to Elmira afterwards and became a junior hockey coach. In 2013 he was brought on by the Elmira Jackals, a minor professional outfit, as an assistant and worked for the team for three years. As of 2021, he's working as a coach and physical education instructor at the Notre Dame High School.

Thomaris was inducted into the Elmira College Athletic Hall of Fame in 2021. On June 7, 2022, Thomaris was named the first head coach of the Elmira Mammoth of the Federal Prospects Hockey League.

The Mammoth announced on Monday, January 2, 2023, that Thomaris would be taking a leave of absence due to family matters. The team posted a 5–16 record during his time at the helm.

== Statistics ==
=== Regular season and playoffs ===
| | | | Regular Season | | | | | Playoffs |
| Season | Team | League | GP | G | A | Pts | PIM | GP | G | A | Pts | PIM |
|---|---|---|---|---|---|---|---|---|---|---|---|---|
| 1974–75 | Clarkson | ECAC Hockey | 25 | 5 | 5 | 10 | 4 | — | — | — | — | — |
| 1975–76 | Clarkson | ECAC Hockey | 31 | 12 | 13 | 25 | 14 | — | — | — | — | — |
| 1976–77 | Clarkson | ECAC Hockey | 30 | 3 | 6 | 9 | 16 | — | — | — | — | — |
| NCAA totals | | | 86 | 20 | 24 | 44 | 34 | — | — | — | — | — |

== Head coaching record ==
Record table
| Season | Team | Overall | Conference | Standing | Postseason |
|---|---|---|---|---|---|
Elmira Soaring Ealges (ECAC West) (1987–2001)
| 1987–88 | Elmira | 27–6–0 | 20–2–0 | 1st | NCAA Runner-Up |
| 1988–89 | Elmira | 19–10–0 | 14–7–0 | 6th | ECAC West Semifinal |
| 1989–90 | Elmira | 24–8–1 | 19–3–1 | 2nd | NCAA Quarterfinals |
| 1990–91 | Elmira | 27–6–0 | 23–3–0 | 1st | NCAA Third Place Game (loss) |
| 1991–92 | Elmira | 21–10–0 | 18–4–0 | 2nd | NCAA Quarterfinals |
| 1992–93 | Elmira | 26–7–0 | 19–5–0 | 2nd | NCAA Third Place Game (win) |
| 1993–94 | Elmira | 21–6–2 | 19–1–0 | 1st | NCAA Quarterfinals |
| 1994–95 | Elmira | 9–13–4 | 2–4–2 | 4th | ECAC West Semifinal |
| 1995–96 | Elmira | 13–13–0 | 4–4–0 | 4th | ECAC West Semifinal |
| 1996–97 | Elmira | 15–9–5 | 5–3–2 | 3rd | NCAA Quarterfinals |
| 1997–98 | Elmira | 14–11–0 | 4–6–0 | 5th | |
| 1998–99 | Elmira | 16–8–2 | 4–1–1 | 2nd | ECAC West Semifinal |
| 1999–00 | Elmira | 21–6–0 | 5–1–0 | T–1st | ECAC West Runner-Up |
| 2000–01 | Elmira | 16–10–0 | 3–3–0 | 2nd | ECAC West Semifinal |
| Elmira: | | 269–123–14 | 159–47–6 | | |
Potsdam State Bears (SUNYAC) (2002–2007)
| 2002–03 | Potsdam State | 14–13–2 | 7–6–1 | T–4th | SUNYAC Semifinals |
| 2003–04 | Potsdam State | 11–14–2 | 9–4–1 | T–2nd | SUNYAC Semifinals |
| 2004–05 | Potsdam State | 10–14–3 | 6–6–2 | T–4th | SUNYAC Quarterfinals |
| 2005–06 | Potsdam State | 7–15–4 | 6–7–1 | 6th | SUNYAC Quarterfinals |
| 2006–07 | Potsdam State | 5–19–1 | 3–10–1 | 8th | |
| Potsdam State: | | 47–75–12 | 31–33–6 | | |
| Total: | | 316–198–23 | | | |
National champion Postseason invitational champion Conference regular season champion Conference regular season and conference tournament champion Division regular season champion Division regular season and conference tournament champion Conference tournament champion

Awards and achievements
| Preceded by Tony Mariano; Bill Beaney | Edward Jeremiah Award; 1987–88; 1990–91 | Succeeded by Terry Meagher; Bruce Marshall |
