= Tony Mariano =

American athletic director

Biographical details
- Born: Rome, New York, U.S.
- Education: Norwich University

Playing career

Ice hockey
- 1971–1974: St. Lawrence
- Position: Forward

Coaching career (HC unless noted)

Ice hockey
- 1974–1975: Norwich (graduate assistant)
- 1978–1982: Norwich (assistant)
- 1982–1992: Norwich

Soccer
- 1975: Norwich (graduate assistant)
- 1978–1984: Norwich

Administrative career (AD unless noted)
- 1992–2022: Norwich

Head coaching record
- Overall: 147–111–9 (ice hockey)
- Tournaments: 1–1

Accomplishments and honors

Awards
- Edward Jeremiah Award (1987)

Anthony Mariano is an American athletic director for Norwich University. In May 2021 he announced that he would be retiring following the 2021–22 academic year after 30 years in his position.

== Career ==
Mariano's college career began at St. Lawrence University where he played for both the ice hockey and soccer teams. He graduated in 1974 with a degree in physical education. He spent the following year attending Norwich University, working as an assistant on the men's ice hockey and soccer teams while earning a master's in education. After graduating in 1975, he returned to Norwich three years later as the soccer team's head coach. He also pulled double duty as an assistant for the ice hockey team. After Don Cahoon left to take over at Princeton, Mariano became the head coach for the ice hockey team as well.

Mariano remained in charge of both programs for two seasons but decided to focus on the ice hockey team after 1984. In 1987, Mariano led Norwich to its first NCAA Tournament appearance and was named the Division III coach of the year. In 1992 he was named as the school's Athletic director and remained in that position for the next 30 years. He was instrumental in bringing in Mike McShane to head the ice hockey team in 1995, a move that bore fruit in the shape of 4 national championships and 17 consecutive conference championships.

== Statistics ==
=== Regular season and playoffs ===
			Regular Season					Playoffs
Season	Team	League	GP	G	A	Pts	PIM	GP	G	A	Pts	PIM
1971–72	St. Lawrence	ECAC Hockey	26	4	10	14	6	—	—	—	—	—
1972–73	St. Lawrence	ECAC Hockey	28	9	20	29	10	—	—	—	—	—
1973–74	St. Lawrence	ECAC Hockey	26	6	5	11	8	—	—	—	—	—
NCAA totals			80	19	35	54	24	—	—	—	—	—

== Head coaching record ==
=== Ice hockey ===
Record table
Season	Team	Overall	Conference	Standing	Postseason
Norwich Cadets (ECAC 2) (1982–1985)
1982–83	Norwich	17–10–0	14–7–0	T–6th	ECAC 2 West Quarterfinal
1983–84	Norwich	17–9–0	14–7–0	8th	ECAC 2 East Semifinal
1984–85	Norwich	18–11–0	13–9–0	10th	ECAC East Semifinal
Norwich:		52–30–0	41–23–0		
Norwich Cadets (ECAC East) (1985–1988)
1985–86	Norwich	16–11–1	13–8–1	5th	ECAC East Semifinal
1986–87	Norwich	16–12–1	12–8–0	5th	NCAA Quarterfinals
1987–88	Norwich	17–8–0	15–6–0	T–3rd	ECAC East Quarterfinals
1988–89	Norwich	12–12–0	9–11–0	8th	
1989–90	Norwich	11–11–4	10–7–4	6th	ECAC East Quarterfinals
1990–91	Norwich	10–16–0	7–15–0	10th	
1991–92	Norwich	13–11–3	11–9–3	6th	ECAC East Semifinals
Norwich:		95–81–9	77–64–8		
Total:		147–111–9			

Awards and achievements
Preceded by Terry Meagher	Edward Jeremiah Award; 1986–87	Succeeded by Glenn Thomaris
