= 2007–08 NCAA Division III men's ice hockey season =

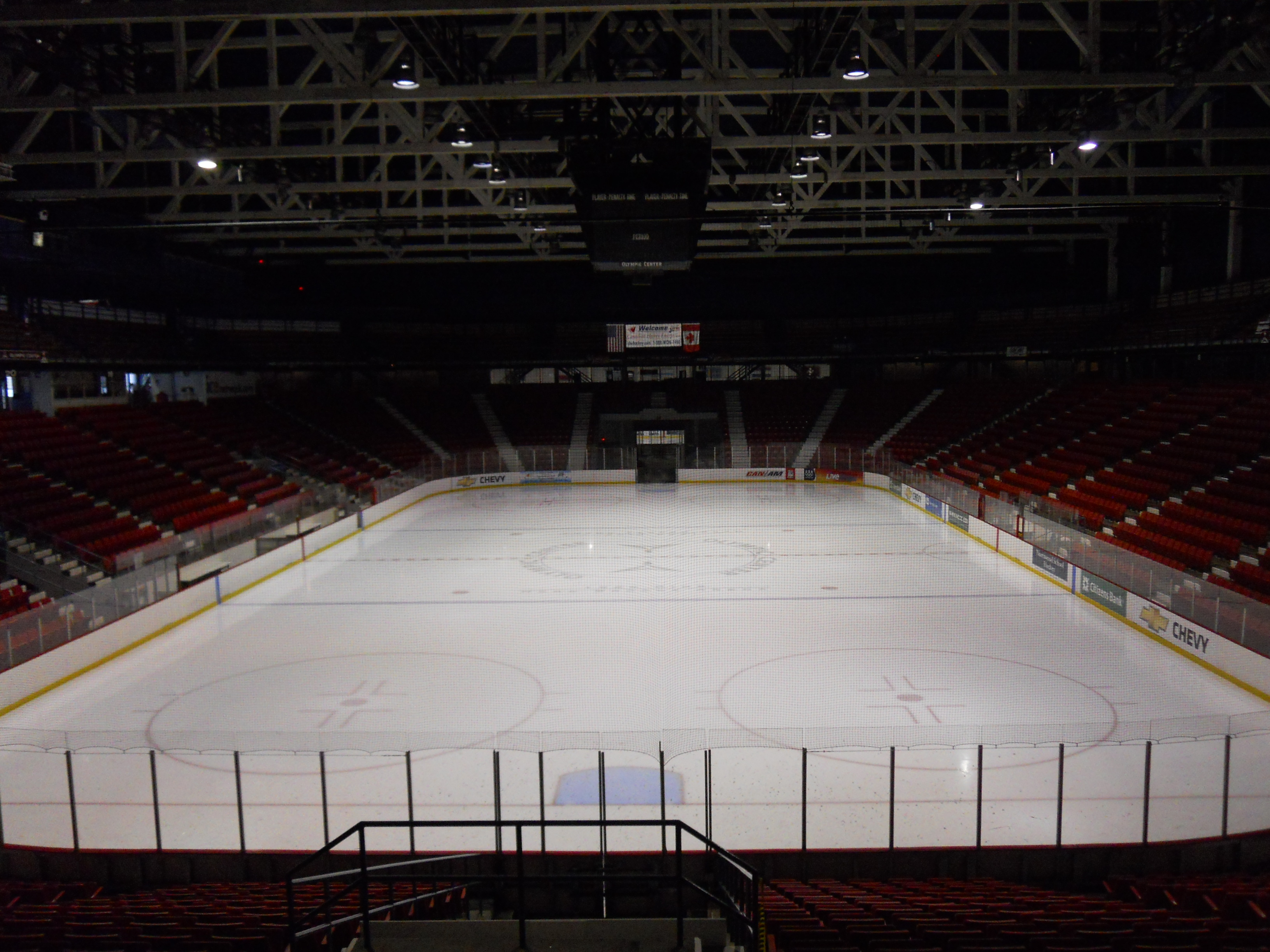
- Herb Brooks Arena was the host of the 2008 Frozen Four
- Duration: October 19, 2007– March 23, 2008
- NCAA tournament: 2008
- National championship: Herb Brooks Arena; Lake Placid, New York
- NCAA champion: St. Norbert
- Sid Watson Award: Kyle Jones (St. Norbert)

The 2007–08 NCAA Division III men's ice hockey season began on October 19, 2007 and concluded on March 23 of the following year. This was the 35th season of Division III college ice hockey.

The MCHA added two teams for this season, bringing its membership above the minimum required (seven) to receive an automatic bid for the NCAA tournament. In order to receive the bid, the MCHA announced that all of its members must be Division III programs after the 2009 season. This new rule only affected Minnesota–Crookston, who would spend the next two years attempting to find a solution.

== Regular season ==
=== Standings ===
2007–08 ECAC East standings
	Conference							Overall					
	GP	W	L	T	PTS	GF	GA	GP	W	L	T	GF	GA
Division III
Norwich †*	19	15	4	0	30	87	44	30	23	7	0	141	69
Babson	19	13	4	2	28	76	43	26	17	6	3	100	64
Castleton State	19	11	6	2	24	66	48	26	13	11	2	88	70
New England College	19	10	6	3	23	61	49	27	16	8	3	107	69
Southern Maine	19	8	8	3	19	66	40	26	14	9	3	96	82
Salem State	19	9	9	1	19	64	69	28	16	11	1	114	91
Massachusetts–Boston	19	5	12	2	12	58	74	27	11	14	2	87	100
Skidmore	19	4	14	1	9	56	92	26	7	17	2	76	120
Division II
Saint Anselm	19	5	11	3	13	47	67	27	12	12	3	86	86
Saint Michael's ~	19	5	13	1	11	55	88	27	12	14	1	89	107
ECAC East Championship: March 9, 2008; Northeast-10 Championship: March 8, 2008 † indicates conference regular season champion * indicates conference tournament champion ~ indicates Northeast-10 Tournament champion

2007–08 ECAC Northeast standings
	Conference							Overall					
	GP	W	L	T	PTS	GF	GA	GP	W	L	T	GF	GA
Division III
Curry †	16	14	1	1	29	96	36	26	26	9	1	117	75
Massachusetts–Dartmouth *	16	13	3	0	26	75	29	28	18	9	1	112	67
Nichols	16	12	4	0	24	72	44	28	20	7	1	127	85
Wentworth	16	10	5	1	21	74	45	26	11	14	1	87	98
Suffolk	16	10	6	0	20	57	43	27	13	14	0	92	87
Becker	16	9	6	1	19	53	54	26	12	12	2	76	92
Salve Regina	16	8	5	3	19	48	51	24	10	10	4	73	86
Fitchburg State	16	8	5	3	19	64	49	27	13	10	4	106	78
Plymouth State	16	7	7	2	16	55	46	25	10	12	3	79	76
Johnson & Wales	16	7	9	0	14	74	67	25	8	17	0	99	109
Western New England	16	4	10	2	10	33	62	25	6	17	2	47	96
Worcester State	16	2	14	0	4	40	104	24	2	22	0	58	169
Framingham State	16	0	15	1	1	37	92	25	1	23	1	60	143
Division II
Stonehill	16	9	6	1	19	60	53	25	12	11	2	91	93
Southern New Hampshire	16	7	8	1	15	55	69	26	12	13	1	89	109
Assumption	16	4	12	0	8	47	82	26	7	19	0	75	130
Franklin Pierce	16	4	12	0	8	54	68	25	6	19	0	93	118
ECAC Northeast Championship: March 8, 2008; Northeast-10 Championship: March 8, 2008 † indicates conference regular season champion * indicates conference tournament champions ~ indicates Northeast-10 Tournament champion

2007–08 ECAC West standings
	Conference							Overall					
	GP	W	L	T	PTS	GF	GA	GP	W	L	T	GF	GA
Elmira †	15	10	2	3	23	55	32	29	20	4	5	112	56
Manhattanville *	15	8	5	2	18	64	38	28	18	7	3	109	58
Utica	15	8	6	1	17	61	39	26	15	10	1	97	67
Hobart	15	7	6	2	16	53	41	28	18	8	2	110	70
Neumann	15	8	7	0	16	61	50	26	17	9	0	116	81
Lebanon Valley	15	0	15	0	0	23	117	25	1	23	1	42	160
Championship: March 8, 2008 † indicates conference regular season champion * indicates conference tournament champions

2007–08 Midwest Collegiate Hockey Association standings
	Conference							Overall					
	GP	W	L	T	PTS	GF	GA	GP	W	L	T	GF	GA
Adrian †*	20	19	1	0	38	168	41	29	26	3	0	220	65
Marian	20	14	5	1	29	90	63	28	17	10	1	113	90
Finlandia	20	14	6	0	28	96	59	29	18	9	2	118	80
MSOE	20	11	9	0	22	82	73	28	15	13	0	101	100
Lawrence	20	10	9	1	21	77	76	27	10	14	3	91	106
Minnesota–Crookston	20	5	15	0	10	60	108	27	6	21	0	74	138
Northland	20	4	16	0	8	50	114	27	4	23	0	55	159
Concordia (WI)	20	2	18	0	4	50	139	27	2	25	0	57	200
Championship: March 2, 2008 † indicates conference regular season champion * indicates conference tournament champions

2007–08 Minnesota Intercollegiate Athletic Conference ice hockey standings
	Conference							Overall					
	GP	W	L	T	Pts	GF	GA	GP	W	L	T	GF	GA
Hamline †	16	11	3	2	24	64	45	27	16	7	4	106	75
St. Thomas *	16	11	4	1	23	72	37	29	20	7	2	120	61
Bethel	16	11	4	1	23	61	44	25	16	7	2	102	81
Gustavus Adolphus	16	10	6	0	20	64	40	26	13	12	1	98	73
Saint John's	16	8	6	2	18	64	50	27	13	12	2	100	81
St. Olaf	16	6	7	3	15	51	53	25	9	12	4	81	83
Saint Mary's	16	6	10	0	12	56	64	25	9	14	2	91	98
Augsburg	16	4	12	0	8	45	74	25	6	17	2	69	107
Concordia (MN)	16	0	15	1	1	34	104	25	1	23	1	49	145
Championship: March 5, 2008 † indicates conference regular season champion * indicates conference tournament champion

2007–08 New England Small College Athletic Conference ice hockey standings
	Conference							Overall					
	GP	W	L	T	PTS	GF	GA	GP	W	L	T	GF	GA
Colby †	19	13	5	1	27	68	42	25	15	9	1	85	60
Middlebury	19	12	5	2	26	68	47	27	18	7	2	96	66
Bowdoin	19	13	6	0	26	95	56	24	17	7	0	117	71
Amherst	19	11	6	2	24	62	47	26	14	9	3	81	64
Connecticut College	19	9	8	2	20	65	55	25	9	13	3	73	75
Trinity *	19	8	9	2	18	42	54	29	16	11	2	81	79
Williams	19	7	8	4	18	59	66	25	9	12	4	71	94
Wesleyan	19	6	10	3	15	45	68	24	8	13	3	55	86
Hamilton	19	4	14	1	9	52	83	24	5	18	1	59	99
Tufts	19	4	14	1	9	49	89	24	6	17	1	64	115
Championship: March 9, 2008 † indicates conference regular season champion * indicates conference tournament champion

2007–08 Northern Collegiate Hockey Association standings
	Conference							Overall					
	GP	W	L	T	Pts	GF	GA	GP	W	L	T	GF	GA
St. Norbert †*	14	10	0	4	24	53	18	32	27	1	4	118	43
Wisconsin–River Falls	14	8	5	1	17	56	42	27	16	7	4	118	80
Wisconsin–Stout	14	7	5	2	16	46	35	30	18	9	3	124	77
Wisconsin–Superior	14	6	4	4	16	32	35	27	13	6	8	78	56
Wisconsin–Eau Claire	14	6	7	1	13	30	27	28	11	16	1	68	77
Wisconsin–Stevens Point	14	5	6	3	13	32	34	27	14	9	4	83	64
St. Scholastica	14	4	7	3	11	36	43	28	10	13	5	82	85
Lake Forest	14	1	13	0	2	19	70	27	3	23	1	42	123
Championship: March 8, 2008 † indicates conference regular season champion * indicates conference tournament champion

2007–08 State University of New York Athletic Conference ice hockey standings
	Conference							Overall					
	GP	W	L	T	PTS	GF	GA	GP	W	L	T	GF	GA
Plattsburgh State †*	16	14	2	0	28	75	32	30	25	5	0	140	62
Oswego State	16	13	2	1	27	76	32	26	18	6	2	113	57
Fredonia State	16	10	4	2	22	52	40	27	15	9	3	90	74
Potsdam State	16	6	7	3	15	47	63	27	10	13	4	73	105
Cortland State	16	6	8	2	14	53	66	26	11	12	3	88	99
Buffalo State	16	5	7	4	14	47	54	26	10	12	4	74	79
Geneseo State	16	6	10	0	12	50	59	25	8	17	0	68	91
Brockport State	16	4	10	2	10	43	61	25	7	15	3	85	94
Morrisville State	16	1	15	0	2	39	75	25	5	20	0	69	113
Championship: March 1, 2008 † indicates conference regular season champion * indicates conference tournament champions

Note: Mini-game are not included in final standings

== 2008 NCAA Tournament ==
First Round; March 12
W2	St. Thomas	4
W3	Wisconsin–Stout	1
E6	Massachusetts–Dartmouth	3
E7	Trinity	7

Quarterfinals; March 15
W1	St. Norbert	2*
W2	St. Thomas	1
E3	Norwich	3
E4	Manhattanville	0
E2	Plattsburgh State	5
E5	Hobart	2
E1	Elmira	6
E7	Trinity	1

Semifinals; March 22
W1	St. Norbert	3
E3	Norwich	0
E2	Plattsburgh State	6
E1	Elmira	1

National Championship; March 23
W1	St. Norbert	2
E2	Plattsburgh State	0

Note: * denotes overtime period(s)

== See also ==
- 2007–08 NCAA Division I men's ice hockey season
