= SUNYAC ice hockey tournament =

SUNYAC TOURNAMENT

State University of New York Athletic Conference men's tournament
- Conference hockey championship
- Sport: Ice hockey
- Conference: SUNYAC
- Format: Modified best of three, single-elimination
- Played: 1985–Present

== History ==
In 1985, a year after downgrading all of their ice hockey programs from Division II to Division III, the SUNYAC teams began to hold an unofficial conference tournament. All of the programs were in the ECAC West at the time and still eligible to participate in that conference tournament so the SUNYAC championship was held just before the ECAC West Men's Tournament. In 1992 the SUNYAC conference began sponsoring ice hockey as a men's sport and all SUNYAC teams left the ECAC West to formally found the new ice hockey division. When the tournament became an official conference championship the format was changed to a two-game point system where teams would receive 2 points for a win and one point for a tie. If the teams remained tied after two games then a 20-minute mini-game would be played to determine the winner. By NCAA regulations mini games do not count for team records or statistics. The tournament was expanded to six games in 1998 with all rounds using the point system. in 2007 the points system was abandoned and all rounds were changed to single-elimination. The 2021 tournament was cancelled due to the COVID-19 pandemic.

== 1985 ==
| Seed | School | Conference record |
|---|---|---|
| 1 | Plattsburgh State | 10–2–0 |
| 2 | Oswego State | 9–3–0 |
| 3 | Geneseo State | |
| 4 | Brockport State | 6–6–0 |

Semifinals; February 22
1 | Plattsburgh State | 8
4 | Brockport State | 3
2 | Oswego State | 3
3 | Geneseo State | 1

Championship; February 23
1 | Plattsburgh State | 5
2 | Oswego State | 3

Note: * denotes overtime period(s)

== 1986 ==
| Seed | School | Conference record |
|---|---|---|
| 1 | Oswego State | 8–3–1 |
| 2 | Geneseo State | |
| 3 | Buffalo | |
| 4 | Potsdam State | |

Semifinals; February 21
1 | Oswego State | 9
4 | Potsdam State | 5
2 | Geneseo State | 10
3 | Buffalo | 0

Championship; February 22
1 | Oswego State | 2
2 | Geneseo State | 3*

Note: * denotes overtime period(s)

== 1987 ==
| Seed | School | Conference record |
|---|---|---|
| 1 | Plattsburgh State | 12–0–0 |
| 2 | Oswego State | 8–4–0 |
| 3 | Geneseo State | |
| 4 | Potsdam State | |

Semifinals; February 20
1 | Plattsburgh State | 8
4 | Potsdam State | 1
2 | Oswego State | 8
3 | Geneseo State | 3

Championship; February 21
1 | Plattsburgh State | 4
2 | Oswego State | 2

Note: * denotes overtime period(s)

== 1988 ==
| Seed | School | Conference record |
|---|---|---|
| 1 | Plattsburgh State | 11–1–0 |
| 2 | Oswego State | 10–2–0 |
| 3 | Brockport State | 7–4–1 |
| 4 | Geneseo State | |

Semifinals; February 19
1 | Plattsburgh State | 8
4 | Geneseo State | 1
2 | Oswego State | 8
3 | Brockport State | 3

Championship; February 20
1 | Plattsburgh State | 6
2 | Oswego State | 2

Note: * denotes overtime period(s)

== 1989 ==
| Seed | School | Conference record |
|---|---|---|
| 1 | Oswego State | 9–2–1 |
| 2 | Geneseo State | |
| 3 | Potsdam State | |
| 4 | Cortland State | |

Semifinals; February 17
1 | Oswego State | 6
4 | Cortland State | 5
2 | Geneseo State | 7
3 | Potsdam State | 5

Championship; February 18
1 | Oswego State | 5
2 | Geneseo State | 4

Note: * denotes overtime period(s)

== 1990 ==
| Seed | School | Conference record |
|---|---|---|
| 1 | Plattsburgh State | 10–2–0 |
| 2 | Geneseo State | |
| 3 | Oswego State | 6–5–1 |
| 4 | Fredonia State | |

Semifinals; February 23
1 | Plattsburgh State | 6
4 | Fredonia State | 0
2 | Geneseo State | 7
3 | Oswego State | 6

Championship; February 24
1 | Plattsburgh State | 5
2 | Oswego State | 4

Note: * denotes overtime period(s)

== 1991 ==
| Seed | School | Conference record |
|---|---|---|
| 1 | Oswego State | 9–5–0 |
| 2 | Geneseo State | |
| 3 | Cortland State | |
| 4 | Fredonia State | |

Semifinals; February 22
1 | Oswego State | 3
4 | Fredonia State | 2
2 | Geneseo State | 8
3 | Cortland State | 4

Championship; February 23
1 | Oswego State | 6
2 | Geneseo State | 2

Note: * denotes overtime period(s)

== 1992 ==
| Seed | School | Conference record |
|---|---|---|
| 1 | Plattsburgh State | 13–0–1 |
| 2 | Fredonia State | |
| 3 | Oswego State | 8–5–1 |
| 4 | Geneseo State | |

Semifinals; February 28
1 | Plattsburgh State | 6
4 | Geneseo State | 4
2 | Fredonia State | 7
3 | Oswego State | 3

Championship; February 29
1 | Plattsburgh State | 8
2 | Fredonia State | 4

Note: * denotes overtime period(s)

== 1993 ==
| Seed | School | Conference record |
|---|---|---|
| 1 | Plattsburgh State | 11–0–1 |
| 2 | Cortland State | 8–4–0 |
| 3 | Fredonia State | 7–4–1 |
| 4 | Oswego State | 5–7–0 |

Semifinals; February 26–27
1 | Plattsburgh State | 12 | 5 | -
4 | Oswego State | 5 | 1 | -
2 | Cortland State | 5 | 5 | -
3 | Fredonia State | 2 | 3 | -

Championship; March 5–6
1 | Plattsburgh State | 10 | 12 | -
2 | Cortland State | 5 | 4 | -

Note: * denotes overtime period(s)
Mini games in italics

== 1994 ==
| Seed | School | Conference record |
|---|---|---|
| 1 | Fredonia State | 11–0–1 |
| 2 | Plattsburgh State | 9–2–1 |
| 3 | Oswego State | 5–7–0 |
| 4 | Potsdam State | 5–7–0 |

Semifinals; February 25–26
1 | Fredonia State | 8 | 7 | -
4 | Potsdam State | 3 | 1 | -
2 | Plattsburgh State | 7 | 3 | 1
3 | Oswego State | 1 | 7 | 0

Championship; March 4–5
1 | Fredonia State | 6 | 6 | -
2 | Plattsburgh State | 5 | 3 | -

Note: * denotes overtime period(s)
Mini games in italics

== 1995 ==
| Seed | School | Conference record |
|---|---|---|
| 1 | Fredonia State | 12–2–0 |
| 2 | Plattsburgh State | 12–2–0 |
| 3 | Potsdam State | 9–5–0 |
| 4 | Oswego State | 7–6–1 |

Semifinals; February 24–25
1 | Fredonia State | 6 | 5 | -
4 | Oswego State | 4 | 3 | -
2 | Plattsburgh State | 6 | 9 | -
3 | Potsdam State | 2 | 2 | -

Championship; March 3–4
1 | Fredonia State | 3 | 4 | -
2 | Plattsburgh State | 3 | 1 | -

Note: * denotes overtime period(s)
Mini games in italics

== 1996 ==
| Seed | School | Conference record |
|---|---|---|
| 1 | Plattsburgh State | 13–1–0 |
| 2 | Potsdam State | 11–3–0 |
| 3 | Oswego State | 10–4–0 |
| 4 | Fredonia State | 8–5–1 |

Semifinals; February 23–24
1 | Plattsburgh State | 7 | 2 | -
4 | Fredonia State | 3 | 2 | -
2 | Potsdam State | 4 | 5 | 1
3 | Oswego State | 7 | 4 | 0

Championship; March 1–2
1 | Plattsburgh State | 4 | 4 | 0
2 | Potsdam State | 3 | 3 | 1

Note: * denotes overtime period(s)
Mini games in italics

== 1997 ==
| Seed | School | Conference record |
|---|---|---|
| 1 | Fredonia State | |
| 2 | Plattsburgh State | 10–3–1 |
| 3 | Potsdam State | |
| 4 | Oswego State | 8–5–1 |

Semifinals; February 28–March 1
1 | Fredonia State | 4 | 2 | 2
4 | Oswego State | 5 | 1 | 0
2 | Plattsburgh State | 6 | 7 | -
3 | Potsdam State | 2 | 4 | -

Championship; March 7–8
1 | Fredonia State | 1 | 1 | -
2 | Plattsburgh State | 1 | 6 | -

Note: * denotes overtime period(s)
Mini games in italics

== 1998 ==
| Seed | School | Conference record | Seed | School | Conference record |
|---|---|---|---|---|---|
| 1 | Oswego State | 11–2–1 | 4 | Potsdam State | 8–4–2 |
| 2 | Geneseo State | 9–3–2 | 5 | Brockport State | 7–6–1 |
| 3 | Plattsburgh State | 9–4–1 | 6 | Fredonia State | 5–9–0 |

Play–In; February 20–21
3 | Plattsburgh State | 7 | 6 | -
6 | Fredonia State | 2 | 2 | -
4 | Potsdam State | 5 | 5 | -
5 | Brockport State | 5 | 4 | -

Semifinals; February 27–28
1 | Oswego State | 5 | 4 | 2
4 | Potsdam State | 2 | 6 | 1
2 | Geneseo State | 1 | 2 | -
3 | Plattsburgh State | 7 | 4 | -

Championship; March 6–7
1 | Oswego State | 3 | 2 | -
3 | Plattsburgh State | 4 | 4 | -

Note: * denotes overtime period(s)
Mini games in italics

== 1999 ==
| Seed | School | Conference record | Seed | School | Conference record |
|---|---|---|---|---|---|
| 1 | Plattsburgh State | 13–0–1 | 4 | Geneseo State | 8–6–0 |
| 2 | Fredonia State | 11–3–0 | 5 | Potsdam State | 11–3–0 |
| 3 | Oswego State | 6–8–0 | 6 | Brockport State | 3–9–2 |

Play–In; February 19–20
3 | Oswego State | 3 | 5 | -
6 | Brockport State | 3 | 2 | -
4 | Geneseo State | 2 | 3 | -
5 | Potsdam State | 2 | 2 | -

Semifinals; February 26–27
1 | Plattsburgh State | 5 | 8 | -
4 | Geneseo State | 0 | 1 | -
2 | Fredonia State | 3 | 2 | -
3 | Oswego State | 3 | 4 | -

Championship; March 5–6
1 | Plattsburgh State | 5 | 4 | -
3 | Oswego State | 4 | 4 | -

Note: * denotes overtime period(s)
Mini games in italics

== 2000 ==
| Seed | School | Conference record | Seed | School | Conference record |
|---|---|---|---|---|---|
| 1 | Plattsburgh State | 13–0–1 | 4 | Oswego State | 6–6–2 |
| 2 | Potsdam State | 10–4–0 | 5 | Brockport State | 5–8–1 |
| 3 | Fredonia State | 8–4–2 | 6 | Geneseo State | 4–9–1 |

Play–In; February 18–19
3 | Fredonia State | 3 | 2 | -
6 | Geneseo State | 3 | 3 | -
4 | Oswego State | 6 | 3 | -
5 | Brockport State | 4 | 3 | -

Semifinals; February 25–26
1 | Plattsburgh State | 9 | 7 | -
6 | Geneseo State | 3 | 2 | -
2 | Potsdam State | 2 | 8 | 2
4 | Oswego State | 3 | 7 | 0

Championship; March 3–4
1 | Plattsburgh State | 6 | 6 | -
2 | Potsdam State | 0 | 2 | -

Note: * denotes overtime period(s)
Mini games in italics

== 2001 ==
| Seed | School | Conference record | Seed | School | Conference record |
|---|---|---|---|---|---|
| 1 | Plattsburgh State | 13–1–0 | 4 | Fredonia State | 7–5–2 |
| 2 | Oswego State | 10–4–0 | 5 | Geneseo State | 5–7–2 |
| 3 | Potsdam State | 8–3–3 | 6 | Cortland State | 4–8–2 |

First Round; February 16–17
3 | Potsdam State | 4 | 7 | -
6 | Cortland State | 0 | 5 | -
4 | Fredonia State | 0 | 1 | -
5 | Geneseo State | 6 | 4 | -

Semifinals; February 23–24
1 | Plattsburgh State | 8 | 7 | -
5 | Geneseo State | 2 | 1 | -
2 | Oswego State | 3 | 2 | -
3 | Potsdam State | 4 | 7 | -

Championship; March 2–4
1 | Plattsburgh State | 6 | 2 | 5
3 | Potsdam State | 3 | 6 | 1

Note: * denotes overtime period(s)
Mini games in italics

== 2002 ==
| Seed | School | Conference record | Seed | School | Conference record |
|---|---|---|---|---|---|
| 1 | Plattsburgh State | 13–1–0 | 4 | Geneseo State | 7–5–2 |
| 2 | Oswego State | 10–3–1 | 5 | Potsdam State | 6–8–0 |
| 3 | Cortland State | 7–5–2 | 6 | Buffalo State | 5–8–1 |

First Round; February 15–16
3 | Cortland State | 0 | 5 | 1
6 | Buffalo State | 4 | 2 | 0
4 | Geneseo State | 2 | 1 | 1
5 | Potsdam State | 1 | 3 | 0

Semifinals; February 22–23
1 | Plattsburgh State | 7 | 1 | 3
4 | Geneseo State | 1 | 2 | 0
2 | Oswego State | 1* | 5* | -
3 | Cortland State | 1 | 4 | -

Championship; March 1–3
1 | Plattsburgh State | 2* | 3* | 2
2 | Oswego State | 2 | 3 | 1

Note: * denotes overtime period(s)
Mini games in italics

== 2003 ==
| Seed | School | Conference record | Seed | School | Conference record |
|---|---|---|---|---|---|
| 1 | Oswego State | 10–3–1 | 4 | Potsdam State | 7–6–1 |
| 2 | Fredonia State | 10–4–0 | 5 | Geneseo State | 7–6–1 |
| 3 | Plattsburgh State | 9–4–1 | 6 | Cortland State | 3–9–2 |

First Round; February 21–22
3 | Plattsburgh State | 9 | 7 | -
6 | Cortland State | 2 | 2 | -
4 | Potsdam State | 6 | 7 | -
5 | Geneseo State | 2 | 3 | -

Semifinals; February 28–March 1
1 | Oswego State | 4 | 5 | -
4 | Potsdam State | 3 | 1 | -
2 | Fredonia State | 2 | 2 | -
3 | Plattsburgh State | 3* | 5 | -

Championship; March 7–9
1 | Oswego State | 3 | 7 | 5
3 | Plattsburgh State | 5 | 4 | 3

Note: * denotes overtime period(s)
Mini games in italics

== 2004 ==
| Seed | School | Conference record | Seed | School | Conference record |
|---|---|---|---|---|---|
| 1 | Plattsburgh State | 12–0–2 | 4 | Geneseo State | 8–4–2 |
| 2 | Potsdam State | 9–4–1 | 5 | Fredonia State | 6–8–0 |
| 3 | Oswego State | 9–4–1 | 6 | Cortland State | 5–9–0 |

Quarterfinals; February 20–21
3 | Oswego State | 5* | 9 | -
6 | Cortland State | 4 | 2 | -
4 | Geneseo State | 3 | 3* | -
5 | Fredonia State | 5 | 3 | -

Semifinals; February 27–28
1 | Plattsburgh State | 8 | 8 | -
5 | Fredonia State | 1 | 2 | -
2 | Potsdam State | 3 | 2 | -
3 | Oswego State | 6 | 8 | -

Championship; March 5–6
1 | Plattsburgh State | 4* | 3* | -
3 | Oswego State | 3 | 2 | -

Note: * denotes overtime period(s)
Mini games in italics

== 2005 ==
| Seed | School | Conference record | Seed | School | Conference record |
|---|---|---|---|---|---|
| 1 | Oswego State | 11–3–0 | 4 | Plattsburgh State | 7–7–0 |
| 2 | Geneseo State | 10–3–1 | 5 | Potsdam State | 6–6–2 |
| 3 | Fredonia State | 9–3–2 | 6 | Cortland State | 5–8–1 |

Quarterfinals; February 18–19
3 | Fredonia State | 4 | 3 | 2*
6 | Cortland State | 2 | 4 | 1
4 | Plattsburgh State | 6 | 4 | -
5 | Potsdam State | 0 | 1 | -

Semifinals; February 25–26
1 | Oswego State | 2 | 1 | -
4 | Plattsburgh State | 3* | 3 | -
2 | Geneseo State | 3* | 5 | -
3 | Fredonia State | 3 | 1 | -

Championship; March 4–5
4 | Plattsburgh State | 2 | 4 | -
2 | Geneseo State | 5 | 5* | -

Note: * denotes overtime period(s)
Mini games in italics

== 2006 ==
| Seed | School | Conference record | Seed | School | Conference record |
|---|---|---|---|---|---|
| 1 | Oswego State | 10–3–1 | 4 | Plattsburgh State | 8–6–0 |
| 2 | Geneseo State | 10–4–0 | 5 | Buffalo State | 8–6–0 |
| 3 | Fredonia State | 8–3–3 | 6 | Potsdam State | 6–7–1 |

Quarterfinals; February 17–18
3 | Fredonia State | 7 | 5 | -
6 | Potsdam State | 2 | 3 | -
4 | Plattsburgh State | 5 | 8 | -
5 | Buffalo State | 4 | 1 | -

Semifinals; February 24–25
1 | Oswego State | 3 | 2 | -
4 | Plattsburgh State | 6 | 5 | -
2 | Geneseo State | 4 | 2 | 1
3 | Fredonia State | 3 | 5 | 0

Championship; March 3–5
4 | Plattsburgh State | 4 | 3 | 3
2 | Geneseo State | 1 | 4 | 4

Note: * denotes overtime period(s)
Mini games in italics

== 2007 ==
| Seed | School | Conference record | Seed | School | Conference record |
|---|---|---|---|---|---|
| 1 | Oswego State | 11–1–2 | 4 | Buffalo State | 6–7–1 |
| 2 | Geneseo State | 10–4–0 | 5 | Fredonia State | 5–7–2 |
| 3 | Plattsburgh State | 6–4–4 | 6 | Brockport State | 3–6–5 |

Quarterfinals; February 20
3 | Plattsburgh State | 9
6 | Brockport State | 2
4 | Buffalo State | 1
5 | Fredonia State | 2*

Semifinals; February 24
1 | Oswego State | 2
5 | Fredonia State | 3*
2 | Geneseo State | 2
3 | Plattsburgh State | 8

Championship; March 3
5 | Fredonia State | 6
3 | Plattsburgh State | 4

Note: * denotes overtime period(s)

== 2008 ==
| Seed | School | Conference record | Seed | School | Conference record |
|---|---|---|---|---|---|
| 1 | Plattsburgh State | 14–2–0 | 4 | Potsdam State | 6–7–3 |
| 2 | Oswego State | 13–2–1 | 5 | Cortland State | 6–8–2 |
| 3 | Fredonia State | 10–4–2 | 6 | Buffalo State | 5–7–4 |

Quarterfinals; February 19
3 | Fredonia State | 4
6 | Buffalo State | 2
4 | Potsdam State | 7
5 | Cortland State | 2

Semifinals; February 23
1 | Plattsburgh State | 6
4 | Potsdam State | 0
2 | Oswego State | 4
3 | Fredonia State | 1

Championship; March 1
1 | Plattsburgh State | 4
2 | Oswego State | 3

Note: * denotes overtime period(s)

== 2009 ==
| Seed | School | Conference record | Seed | School | Conference record |
|---|---|---|---|---|---|
| 1 | Plattsburgh State | 15–0–1 | 4 | Brockport State | 7–7–2 |
| 2 | Oswego State | 11–4–1 | 5 | Potsdam State | 6–6–4 |
| 3 | Geneseo State | 8–7–1 | 6 | Buffalo State | 5–7–4 |

Quarterfinals; February 24
3 | Geneseo State | 4*
6 | Buffalo State | 3
4 | Brockport State | 3
5 | Potsdam State | 1

Semifinals; February 28
1 | Plattsburgh State | 7
4 | Brockport State | 2
2 | Oswego State | 5
3 | Geneseo State | 1

Championship; March 7
1 | Plattsburgh State | 5*
2 | Oswego State | 4

Note: * denotes overtime period(s)

== 2010 ==
| Seed | School | Conference record | Seed | School | Conference record |
|---|---|---|---|---|---|
| 1 | Oswego State | 15–1–0 | 4 | Brockport State | 7–8–1 |
| 2 | Plattsburgh State | 13–2–1 | 5 | Potsdam State | 5–10–1 |
| 3 | Fredonia State | 9–5–2 | 6 | Morrisville State | 5–11–0 |

Quarterfinals; February 23
3 | Fredonia State | 2
6 | Morrisville State | 5
4 | Brockport State | 3
5 | Potsdam State | 0

Semifinals; February 27
1 | Oswego State | 8
6 | Morrisville State | 5
2 | Plattsburgh State | 5
4 | Brockport State | 2

Championship; March 6
1 | Oswego State | 6
2 | Plattsburgh State | 3

Note: * denotes overtime period(s)

== 2011 ==
| Seed | School | Conference record | Seed | School | Conference record |
|---|---|---|---|---|---|
| 1 | Oswego State | 15–1–0 | 4 | Plattsburgh State | 9–7–0 |
| 2 | Geneseo State | 10–5–1 | 5 | Morrisville State | 8–7–1 |
| 3 | Buffalo State | 8–5–3 | 6 | Fredonia State | 7–8–1 |

Quarterfinals; February 23
3 | Buffalo State | 2
6 | Fredonia State | 5
4 | Plattsburgh State | 4*
5 | Morrisville State | 3

Semifinals; February 26
1 | Oswego State | 1
6 | Fredonia State | 2*
2 | Geneseo State | 2
4 | Plattsburgh State | 3*

Championship; March 5
6 | Fredonia State | 1
4 | Plattsburgh State | 4

Note: * denotes overtime period(s)

== 2012 ==
| Seed | School | Conference record | Seed | School | Conference record |
|---|---|---|---|---|---|
| 1 | Oswego State | 14–0–2 | 4 | Geneseo State | 7–8–1 |
| 2 | Plattsburgh State | 12–3–1 | 5 | Fredonia State | 6–7–3 |
| 3 | Buffalo State | 8–7–1 | 6 | Potsdam State | 6–10–0 |

Quarterfinals; February 22
3 | Buffalo State | 4
6 | Potsdam State | 3
4 | Geneseo State | 1
5 | Fredonia State | 4

Semifinals; February 25
1 | Oswego State | 8
5 | Fredonia State | 3
2 | Plattsburgh State | 4***
3 | Buffalo State | 3

Championship; March 3
1 | Oswego State | 2
2 | Plattsburgh State | 3

Note: * denotes overtime period(s)

=== Quarterfinals ===
==== (E4) Oshawa Generals vs. (E5) Kingston Frontenacs ====
| February 22 | Buffalo State | 4 – 3 | Potsdam State | Buffalo State Sports Arena |
| No scoring | | First period | No scoring |
| 00:38 – Shane Avery (4); 18:17 – Matt Bessing (6) | | Second period | Adam Place (11) – pp – 04:30 |
| 12:30 – pp – Drew Klin (12); 16:37 – pp – Taylor McGraw (2) | | Third period | Mike Arnold (10) – 07:42; Sy Nutkevitch (9) – 07:59 |
| Kevin Carr (26 saves / 29 shots) | | Goalie stats | Kevin McFarland (42 saves / 46 shots) |

== 2013 ==
| Seed | School | Conference record | Seed | School | Conference record |
|---|---|---|---|---|---|
| 1 | Oswego State | 14–2–0 | 4 | Buffalo State | 7–8–1 |
| 2 | Plattsburgh State | 13–2–1 | 5 | Fredonia State | 5–9–2 |
| 3 | Geneseo State | 11–4–1 | 6 | Potsdam State | 6–10–0 |

Quarterfinals; February 20
3 | Geneseo State | 9
6 | Potsdam State | 0
4 | Buffalo State | 6
5 | Fredonia State | 0

Semifinals; February 23
1 | Oswego State | 5
4 | Buffalo State | 2
2 | Plattsburgh State | 5
3 | Geneseo State | 1

Championship; March 2
1 | Oswego State | 4
2 | Plattsburgh State | 0

Note: * denotes overtime period(s)

== 2014 ==
| Seed | School | Conference record | Seed | School | Conference record |
|---|---|---|---|---|---|
| 1 | Geneseo State | 14–2–0 | 4 | Buffalo State | 6–6–4 |
| 2 | Plattsburgh State | 12–2–2 | 5 | Brockport State | 7–8–1 |
| 3 | Oswego State | 10–5–1 | 6 | Fredonia State | 4–7–5 |

Quarterfinals; February 26
3 | Oswego State | 3
6 | Fredonia State | 0
4 | Buffalo State | 7
5 | Brockport State | 2

Semifinals; March 1
1 | Geneseo State | 2
4 | Buffalo State | 0
2 | Plattsburgh State | 1
3 | Oswego State | 2

Championship; March 8
1 | Geneseo State | 6
3 | Oswego State | 7

Note: * denotes overtime period(s)

== 2015 ==
| Seed | School | Conference record | Seed | School | Conference record |
|---|---|---|---|---|---|
| 1 | Plattsburgh State | 13–2–1 | 4 | Potsdam State | 8–6–2 |
| 2 | Oswego State | 12–2–2 | 5 | Buffalo State | 7–6–3 |
| 3 | Geneseo State | 9–6–1 | 6 | Brockport State | 6–8–2 |

Quarterfinals; February 25
3 | Geneseo State | 4
6 | Brockport State | 6
4 | Potsdam State | 2
5 | Buffalo State | 6

Semifinals; February 28
1 | Plattsburgh State | 7
6 | Brockport State | 5
2 | Oswego State | 2
5 | Buffalo State | 0

Championship; March 7
1 | Plattsburgh State | 2
2 | Oswego State | 1

Note: * denotes overtime period(s)

== 2016 ==
| Seed | School | Conference record | Seed | School | Conference record |
|---|---|---|---|---|---|
| 1 | Plattsburgh State | 12–1–3 | 4 | Oswego State | 8–7–1 |
| 2 | Buffalo State | 11–4–1 | 5 | Brockport State | 6–6–4 |
| 3 | Geneseo State | 9–2–5 | 6 | Potsdam State | 7–7–2 |

Quarterfinals; February 24
3 | Geneseo State | 4
6 | Potsdam State | 1
4 | Oswego State | 8
5 | Brockport State | 0

Semifinals; February 27
1 | Plattsburgh State | 4*
4 | Oswego State | 3
2 | Buffalo State | 1
3 | Geneseo State | 6

Championship; March 5
1 | Plattsburgh State | 1
3 | Geneseo State | 7

Note: * denotes overtime period(s)

=== Quarterfinals ===
==== (3) Geneseo State vs. (6) Potsdam State ====
| February 24 | Geneseo State | 4 – 1 | Potsdam State | Ira S. Wilson Ice Arena | Recap |
| 11:38 – R.J. Burns (7); 13:39 – Matt Solomon (6) | | First period | No scoring |
| 00:32 – Pat Condon (4); 09:03 – David Ripple (8) | | Second period | Logan Brown (1) – 12:50 |
| No scoring | | Third period | No scoring |
| Devin McDonald (44 saves / 45 shots) | | Goalie stats | Brendan McMenimen (16 saves / 20 shots); Nate Skidmore (18 saves / 18 shots) |

==== (4) Owswego State vs. (5) Brockport State ====
| February 24 | Owswego State | 8 – 0 | Brockport State | Tuttle North Ice Arena | Recap |
| No scoring | | First period | No scoring |
| 03:12 – David Ferreira (6); 13:28 – Matt Galati (7); 18:51 – Kenny Neil (15) | | Second period | No scoring |
| 08:43 – Shawn Hulshof (11); 10:47 – Kenny Neil (16); 11:09 – Matt Galati (8); 13:55 – Andrew Barton (10); 19:03 – Brandon Adams (2) | | Third period | No scoring |
| Matt Zawadzki (20 saves / 20 shots) | | Goalie stats | Cole Burack (40 saves / 48 shots) |

=== Semifinals ===
==== (1) Plattsburgh State vs. (4) Oswego State ====
| February 27 | Plattsburgh State | 4 – 3 | OT | Oswego State | Ronald B. Stafford Ice Arena | Recap |
| No scoring | | First period | | No scoring |
| 08:15 – Jesse Neher (3) | | Second period | | Cameron Berry (1) – 11:33; David Ferreira (7) – pp – 14:58 |
| 07:17 – pp – Nick Belger (7); 10:09 – Dillan Fox (9) | | Third period | | Kenny Neil (17) – 15:51 |
| 10:09 – Michael Radisa (9) | | First overtime period | | No scoring |
| Spencer Finney (26 saves / 29 shots) | | Goalie stats | | Matt Zawadzki (33 saves / 37 shots) |

==== (2) Buffalo State vs. (3) Geneseo State ====
| February 27 | Buffalo State | 1 – 6 | Geneseo State | Buffalo State University Ice Arena | Recap |
| 07:55 – Cory Gurski (6) | | First period | No scoring |
| No scoring | | Second period | David Ripple (9) – pp – 11:51 |
| No scoring | | Third period | Stephen Collins (21) – 00:40; David Ripple (10) – pp – 05:36; Trevor Hills (19) – pp – 09:10; A.J. Sgaraglio (4) – en – 13:15; Arthur Gordon (6) – en – 15:13 |
| Mike DeLaVergne (17 saves / 21 shots) | | Goalie stats | Devin McDonald (24 saves / 25 shots); Brad Hawayek (1 save / 1 shot) |

=== Finals ===
==== (1) Plattsburgh State vs. (3) Geneseo State ====
| March 5 | Plattsburgh State | 1 – 7 | Geneseo State | Ronald B. Stafford Ice Arena | Recap |
| No scoring | | First period | Matt Solomon (7) – pp – 07:15; Arthur Gordon (7) – 08:53 |
| No scoring | | Second period | Zach Lynes (4) – 01:46; Matt Solomon (8) – 09:55; Arthur Gordon (8) – pp – 13:40; Stephen Collins (22) – 16:58 |
| 05:22 – Nick Belger (8) | | Third period | Trevor Hills (20) – pp – 05:10 |
| Spencer Finney (6 saves / 10 shots); Brady Rouleau (17 saves / 20 shots) | | Goalie stats | Devin McDonald (42 saves / 43 shots) |

== 2017 ==
| Seed | School | Conference record | Seed | School | Conference record |
|---|---|---|---|---|---|
| 1 | Oswego State | 13–2–1 | 4 | Buffalo State | 9–6–1 |
| 2 | Plattsburgh State | 10–5–1 | 5 | Fredonia State | 7–8–1 |
| 3 | Geneseo State | 10–5–1 | 6 | Brockport State | 7–9–0 |

Quarterfinals; February 22
3 | Geneseo State | 7
6 | Brockport State | 0
4 | Buffalo State | 2
5 | Fredonia State | 1

Semifinals; February 25
1 | Oswego State | 6
4 | Buffalo State | 2
2 | Plattsburgh State | 5
3 | Geneseo State | 2

Championship; March 4
1 | Oswego State | 2
2 | Plattsburgh State | 3

Note: * denotes overtime period(s)

== 2018 ==
| Seed | School | Conference record | Seed | School | Conference record |
|---|---|---|---|---|---|
| 1 | Oswego State | 13–2–1 | 4 | Plattsburgh State | 7–8–1 |
| 2 | Geneseo State | 10–3–3 | 5 | Fredonia State | 7–8–1 |
| 3 | Buffalo State | 9–4–3 | 6 | Potsdam State | 6–8–2 |

Quarterfinals; February 21
3 | Buffalo State | 4
6 | Potsdam State | 3
4 | Plattsburgh State | 3
5 | Fredonia State | 4

Semifinals; February 24
1 | Oswego State | 1
5 | Fredonia State | 3
2 | Geneseo State | 5
3 | Buffalo State | 2

Championship; March 3
5 | Fredonia State | 1
2 | Geneseo State | 7

Note: * denotes overtime period(s)

== 2019 ==
| Seed | School | Conference record | Seed | School | Conference record |
|---|---|---|---|---|---|
| 1 | Geneseo State | 13–1–2 | 4 | Buffalo State | 8–6–2 |
| 2 | Oswego State | 11–4–1 | 5 | Fredonia State | 8–6–2 |
| 3 | Plattsburgh State | 10–5–1 | 6 | Brockport State | 7–7–2 |

Quarterfinals; February 20
3 | Plattsburgh State | 3
6 | Brockport State | 1
4 | Buffalo State | 2
5 | Fredonia State | 3*

Semifinals; February 23
1 | Geneseo State | 5
5 | Fredonia State | 2
2 | Oswego State | 3
3 | Plattsburgh State | 2

Championship; March 2
1 | Geneseo State | 4
2 | Oswego State | 3

Note: * denotes overtime period(s)

== 2020 ==
| Seed | School | Conference record | Seed | School | Conference record |
|---|---|---|---|---|---|
| 1 | Geneseo State | 13–1–2 | 4 | Brockport State | 8–7–1 |
| 2 | Oswego State | 12–3–1 | 5 | Plattsburgh State | 6–8–2 |
| 3 | Buffalo State | 8–7–1 | 6 | Potsdam State | 5–9–2 |

Quarterfinals; February 29
3 | Buffalo State | 1
6 | Potsdam State | 3
4 | Brockport State | 2
5 | Plattsburgh State | 3*

Semifinals; February 29, March 3
1 | Geneseo State | 7
6 | Potsdam State | 0
2 | Oswego State | 4
5 | Plattsburgh State | 1

Championship; March 7
1 | Geneseo State | 4
2 | Oswego State | 1

Note: * denotes overtime period(s)
Note: The Oswego vs. Plattsburgh semifinal was rescheduled from February 29 to March 3

== 2022 ==
| Seed | School | Conference record | Seed | School | Conference record |
|---|---|---|---|---|---|
| 1 | Geneseo State | 12–2–1–0–0 | 4 | Cortland State | 9–5–2–1–1 |
| 2 | Oswego State | 12–3–1–0–0 | 5 | Fredonia State | 8–8–0–0–0 |
| 3 | Plattsburgh State | 11–4–1–2–0 | 6 | Brockport State | 6–8–2–0–1 |

Quarterfinals; February 26
3 | Plattsburgh State | 6
6 | Brockport State | 7*
4 | Fredonia State | 1
5 | Cortland State | 5

Semifinals; March 2
1 | Geneseo State | 3
6 | Brockport State | 1
2 | Oswego State | 4
5 | Cortland State | 0

Championship; March 5
1 | Geneseo State | 6
2 | Oswego State | 1

Note: * denotes overtime period(s)

== 2023 ==
| Seed | School | Conference record | Seed | School | Conference record |
|---|---|---|---|---|---|
| 1 | Oswego State | 12–4–0–2 | 4 | Cortland State | 11–5–0–0 |
| 2 | Plattsburgh State | 12–3–1–0 | 5 | Buffalo State | 8–8–0–0 |
| 3 | Geneseo State | 11–4–1–0 | 6 | Fredonia State | 5–11–0–2 |

Quarterfinals; February 22
3 | Geneseo State | 3
6 | Fredonia State | 0
4 | Cortland State | 2
5 | Buffalo State | 3

Semifinals; February 25
1 | Oswego State | 4
5 | Buffalo State | 1
2 | Plattsburgh State | 5
3 | Geneseo State | 1

Championship; March 4
1 | Oswego State | 1
2 | Plattsburgh State | 2

Note: * denotes overtime period(s)

== 2024 ==
| Seed | School | Conference record | Seed | School | Conference record |
|---|---|---|---|---|---|
| 1 | Geneseo State | 14–2–0–0 | 4 | Cortland State | 10–5–1–0 |
| 2 | Oswego State | 12–4–0–1 | 5 | Brockport State | 5–9–2–1 |
| 3 | Plattsburgh State | 12–3–1–0 | 6 | Potsdam State | 5–11–0–0 |

Quarterfinals; February 21
3 | Plattsburgh State | 3
6 | Potsdam State | 2
4 | Cortland State | 5
5 | Brockport State | 1

Semifinals; February 24
1 | Geneseo State | 2
4 | Cortland State | 3
2 | Oswego State | 2
3 | Plattsburgh State | 3

Championship; March 2
4 | Cortland State | 3
3 | Plattsburgh State | 2

Note: * denotes overtime period(s)

== 2025 ==
| Seed | School | Conference record | Seed | School | Conference record |
|---|---|---|---|---|---|
| 1 | Cortland State | 12–2–0–0 | 4 | Plattsburgh State | 8–6–0–0 |
| 2 | Oswego State | 9–4–1–1 | 5 | Potsdam State | 6–7–1–0 |
| 3 | Buffalo State | 9–5–0–1 | 6 | Canton State | 6–8–0–1 |

Quarterfinals; February 26
3 | Buffalo State | 6
6 | Canton State | 4
4 | Plattsburgh State | 5
5 | Potsdam State | 3

Semifinals; March 1
1 | Cortland State | 3
4 | Plattsburgh State | 4*
2 | Oswego State | 5
3 | Buffalo State | 2

Championship; March 8
4 | Plattsburgh State | 2
2 | Oswego State | 5

Note: * denotes overtime period(s)

== 2026 ==
| Seed | School | Conference record | Seed | School | Conference record |
|---|---|---|---|---|---|
| 1 | Hobart | 18–0–0–0 | 5 | Canton State | 8–9–1–2 |
| 2 | Oswego State | 14–4–0–0 | 6 | Plattsburgh State | 9–9–0–0 |
| 3 | Skidmore | 11–6–1–1 | 7 | Buffalo State | 6–11–1–0 |
| 4 | Cortland State | 10–7–1–3 | 8 | Fredonia State | 4–13–1–4 |

Quarterfinals; February 25
1 | Hobart | 3
8 | Fredonia State | 0
2 | Oswego State | 5
7 | Buffalo State | 1
3 | Skidmore | 4
6 | Plattsburgh State | 3
4 | Cortland State | 2
5 | Canton State | 0

Semifinals; February 28
1 | Hobart | 4
4 | Cortland State | 0
2 | Oswego State | 6
3 | Skidmore | 3

Championship; March 7
1 | Hobart | 4
2 | Oswego State | 0

Note: * denotes overtime period(s)

=== Quarterfinals ===
==== (1) Hobart vs. (8) Johnson & Wales ====
| February 25 | Hobart | 3 – 0 | Fredonia State | Geneva Recreation Complex |
| 13:07 – Bauer Morrissey (6) | | First period | No scoring |
| No scoring | | Second period | No scoring |
| 08:01 – Christopher Duclair (12); 15:49 – pp – Nicholas Dimatos (4) | | Third period | No scoring |
| Mavrick Goyer (19 saves / 19 shots) | | Goalie stats | Charles-Anthony Barbeau (55 saves / 58 shots) |

==== (2) Oswego State vs. (7) Buffalo State ====
| February 25 | Oswego State | 5 – 1 | Buffalo State | Campus Center Ice Arena |
| 03:25 – Cam Symons (5) | | First period | Aaron Andrade (10) – 10:30 |
| 09:17 – pp – Matt McQuade (12); 11:36 – pp – Colin Vassallo (15) | | Second period | No scoring |
| 14:05 – Ryan Burke (8); 19:20 – pp – Brandon Cohen (8) | | Third period | No scoring |
| Michael Manzi (21 saves / 22 shots) | | Goalie stats | Marcus Cumberworth (27 saves / 32 shots) |

==== (3) Skidmore vs. (6) Plattsburgh State ====
| February 25 | Skidmore | 4 – 3 | Plattsburgh State | Saratoga Springs Ice Rink |
| 16:59 – Tyler Chenevert (2) | | First period | No scoring |
| 03:37 – Coleman Jenkins (5); 07:50 – Shane Baker (10); 15:17 – pp – Cooper Rice (11) | | Second period | Brannon Butler (1) – 04:42 |
| No scoring | | Third period | Spencer Bellina (5) – 12:03; Jake Sacratini (11) – 19:59 |
| Tommy Aitken (35 saves / 38 shots) | | Goalie stats | Brady Spry (34 saves / 38 shots) |

==== (4) Cortland State vs. (5) Canton State ====
| February 25 | Cortland State | 2 – 0 | Canton State | Alumni Arena |
| No scoring | | First period | No scoring |
| No scoring | | Second period | No scoring |
| 10:50 – Samuel Christiano (11); 18:08 – Thomas Rockey (9) | | Third period | No scoring |
| Nolan Suggs (18 saves / 18 shots) | | Goalie stats | Trey Miller (30 saves / 32 shots) |

=== Semifinals ===
==== (1) Hobart vs. (4) Johnson & Wales ====
| February 28 | Hobart | 4 – 0 | Cortland State | Geneva Recreation Complex |
| 16:29 – Tristan Fasig (6) | | First period | No scoring |
| 04:36 – pp – Kahlil Fontana (20); 16:28 – Bauer Morrissey (7) | | Second period | No scoring |
| 16:29 – Arvega Hovsepyan (11) | | Third period | No scoring |
| Damon Beaver (19 saves / 19 shots) | | Goalie stats | Nolan Suggs (59 saves / 63 shots) |

==== (2) Oswego State vs. (3) Skidmore ====
| February 28 | Oswego State | 6 – 3 | Skidmore | Campus Center Ice Arena |
| 12:33 – Jonathan Balah (2); 14:11 – Michael Urgo (3); 15:57 – Adam Grenier (4) | | First period | Brandon Spaulding (5) – 19:10 |
| 03:10 – Justin Ryan (8) | | Second period | No scoring |
| 13:40 – Brandon Cohen (9); 18:58 – en – Justin Ryan (9) | | Third period | Oscar Worob (6) – 11:23; Mitchell Floccare (4) – 15:47 |
| Michael Manzi (20 saves / 23 shots) | | Goalie stats | Tommy Aitken (35 saves / 40 shots) |

=== Finals ===
==== (1) Hobart vs. (2) Oswego State ====
| March 7 | Hobart | 4 – 0 | Oswego State | Geneva Recreation Complex |
| 04:25 – Dominic Schimizzi (9) | | First period | No scoring |
| No scoring | | Second period | No scoring |
| 01:37 – Dominic Schimizzi (10); 07:19 – pp – Tanner Daniels (15); 16:19 – en – Tamás Tóth (6) | | Third period | No scoring |
| Damon Beaver (30 saves / 30 shots) | | Goalie stats | Michael Manzi (34 saves / 37 shots) |

== Championships ==
| School | Championships |
|---|---|
| Plattsburgh State | 20 |
| Geneseo State | 8 |
| Oswego State | 7 |
| Fredonia State | 3 |
| Cortland State | 1 |
| Hobart | 1 |
| Potsdam State | 1 |
