= Elmira Mammoth =

- City: Elmira, New York
- League: Federal Prospects Hockey League
- Division: Empire
- Founded: 2022
- Folded: 2023
- Home arena: First Arena
- Owners: Tadross Donner Sports and Entertainment LLC
- Head coach: Mike Cosentino
- Website: https://elmira.federalhockey.com/

The Elmira Mammoth were a minor league professional hockey team located in Elmira, New York, playing in the Federal Prospects Hockey League who played in the 2022–23 season. Their home games were played at the First Arena. The team played in orange, white, and purple jerseys.

On Tuesday, June 7, 2022, the Mammoth named former Elmira College and Elmira Jackals coach Glenn Thomaris as the team's first head coach.

The Mammoth announced on Monday, January 2, 2023 that Thomaris would be taking a leave of absence due to family matters. In his place, Justin (Mo) Levac was named Interim Head Player/Coach while Mike Cosentino was chosen as Interim Assistant Coach. Cosentino was appointed to Interim Head Coach just a few weeks later due to Justin (Mo) Levac suffering a season ending injury. Following the 2022-23 season, the Chemung County IDA evicted Mammoth Sports and Entertainment after it was found that they had not paid $250,000 in utility bills. A few weeks later, it was announced that the FPHL would return to Elmira with the league owning the team. The Mammoth roster would be retained into the new team, to be called the Elmira River Sharks.
