= 2002–03 NCAA Division III men's ice hockey season =

- Duration: October 18, 2002– March 22, 2003
- NCAA tournament: 2003
- National championship: Kreitzberg Arena; Norwich, Vermont
- NCAA champion: Norwich
- Sid Watson Award: Māris Ziediņš (St. Norbert)

The 2002–03 NCAA Division III men's ice hockey season began on October 18, 2002, and concluded on March 22, 2003. This was the 30th season of Division III college ice hockey.

The NCAA changed the national tournament format to have all rounds be Single elimination. As a result, the mini-game was eliminated from the Championship.

== Regular season ==
=== Standings ===
2002–03 ECAC East standings
| | Conference | | | | | | | Overall | | | | | |
| | GP | W | L | T | PTS | GF | GA | GP | W | L | T | GF | GA |
Division III
| Norwich †* | 19 | 16 | 3 | 0 | 32 | 129 | 50 | 30 | 27 | 3 | 0 | 191 | 73 |
| New England College | 19 | 15 | 4 | 0 | 30 | 104 | 55 | 26 | 20 | 6 | 0 | 138 | 76 |
| Babson | 19 | 10 | 6 | 3 | 23 | 83 | 72 | 27 | 17 | 7 | 3 | 143 | 93 |
| Salem State | 19 | 9 | 7 | 3 | 21 | 85 | 79 | 27 | 15 | 9 | 3 | 127 | 103 |
| Skidmore | 19 | 6 | 12 | 1 | 13 | 48 | 75 | 25 | 7 | 17 | 1 | 66 | 103 |
| MCLA | 19 | 3 | 14 | 2 | 8 | 64 | 107 | 23 | 5 | 15 | 3 | 88 | 125 |
| Southern Maine | 19 | 3 | 14 | 2 | 8 | 50 | 101 | 25 | 6 | 17 | 2 | 86 | 135 |
| Massachusetts–Boston | 19 | 0 | 18 | 1 | 1 | 33 | 153 | 24 | 0 | 22 | 2 | 43 | 183 |
Division II
| Saint Anselm | 19 | 5 | 12 | 2 | 12 | 53 | 92 | 26 | 9 | 14 | 3 | 78 | 108 |
| Saint Michael's ~ | 19 | 5 | 12 | 2 | 12 | 71 | 108 | 26 | 11 | 13 | 2 | 117 | 130 |
Division III Championship: March 8, 2003; Division II Championship: March 8, 2003 † indicates conference regular season champion * indicates conference tournament champion ~ indicates Division II Tournament champion

2002–03 ECAC Northeast standings
| | Conference | | | | | | | Overall | | | | | |
| | GP | W | L | T | PTS | GF | GA | GP | W | L | T | GF | GA |
Division III
| Wentworth †* | 16 | 13 | 1 | 2 | 28 | 101 | 26 | 29 | 21 | 5 | 3 | 153 | 58 |
| Lebanon Valley | 16 | 14 | 2 | 0 | 28 | 91 | 31 | 27 | 20 | 6 | 1 | 137 | 66 |
| Curry | 16 | 13 | 3 | 0 | 26 | 98 | 43 | 27 | 18 | 9 | 0 | 150 | 97 |
| Fitchburg State | 16 | 12 | 3 | 1 | 25 | 97 | 60 | 26 | 16 | 8 | 2 | 107 | 86 |
| Johnson & Wales | 16 | 11 | 4 | 1 | 23 | 67 | 52 | 26 | 14 | 11 | 1 | 131 | 116 |
| Massachusetts–Dartmouth | 16 | 9 | 6 | 1 | 19 | 67 | 52 | 25 | 15 | 7 | 3 | 103 | 82 |
| Salve Regina | 16 | 8 | 7 | 1 | 17 | 68 | 57 | 25 | 11 | 13 | 1 | 94 | 99 |
| Worcester State | 16 | 7 | 7 | 2 | 16 | 58 | 68 | 25 | 8 | 14 | 3 | 84 | 121 |
| Suffolk | 16 | 6 | 9 | 1 | 13 | 62 | 67 | 21 | 9 | 10 | 2 | 84 | 91 |
| Plymouth State | 16 | 3 | 9 | 4 | 10 | 54 | 86 | 22 | 5 | 12 | 5 | 75 | 120 |
| Western New England | 16 | 4 | 11 | 1 | 9 | 50 | 77 | 23 | 5 | 16 | 2 | 68 | 107 |
| Nichols | 16 | 3 | 13 | 0 | 6 | 41 | 102 | 23 | 4 | 17 | 2 | 70 | 138 |
| Framingham State | 16 | 2 | 14 | 0 | 4 | 35 | 118 | 24 | 3 | 20 | 1 | 52 | 179 |
Division II
| Southern New Hampshire | 16 | 7 | 7 | 2 | 16 | 66 | 52 | 26 | 12 | 11 | 3 | 110 | 88 |
| Stonehill | 16 | 8 | 8 | 0 | 16 | 78 | 69 | 24 | 11 | 13 | 0 | 111 | 103 |
| Assumption | 16 | 7 | 8 | 1 | 15 | 68 | 58 | 27 | 11 | 15 | 1 | 114 | 110 |
| Franklin Pierce | 16 | 0 | 15 | 1 | 1 | 35 | 123 | 23 | 0 | 22 | 1 | 45 | 184 |
Division III Championship: March 8, 2003; Division II Championship: March 8, 2003 † indicates conference regular season champion * indicates conference tournament champions ~ indicates Division II Tournament champion

2002–03 ECAC West standings
| | Conference | | | | | | | Overall | | | | | |
| | GP | W | L | T | PTS | GF | GA | GP | W | L | T | GF | GA |
|---|---|---|---|---|---|---|---|---|---|---|---|---|---|
| RIT † | 10 | 8 | 1 | 1 | 17 | 66 | 31 | 25 | 19 | 4 | 2 | 154 | 72 |
| Manhattanville | 10 | 7 | 3 | 0 | 14 | 46 | 31 | 26 | 18 | 6 | 2 | 108 | 64 |
| Elmira * | 10 | 6 | 3 | 1 | 13 | 64 | 39 | 28 | 18 | 8 | 2 | 154 | 104 |
| Hobart | 10 | 4 | 5 | 1 | 9 | 42 | 43 | 26 | 14 | 10 | 2 | 97 | 84 |
| Utica | 10 | 3 | 6 | 1 | 7 | 39 | 43 | 25 | 11 | 13 | 1 | 84 | 96 |
| Neumann | 10 | 0 | 10 | 0 | 0 | 13 | 83 | 24 | 1 | 22 | 1 | 48 | 173 |
Championship: March 8, 2003 † indicates conference regular season champion * indicates conference tournament champions

2002–03 NCAA Division III Independent ice hockey standings
| | Overall record | | | | | |
| | GP | W | L | T | GF | GA |
|---|---|---|---|---|---|---|
| Finlandia | 10 | 1 | 8 | 1 | 34 | 54 |
| Scranton | 3 | 0 | 3 | 0 | 10 | 23 |

2002–03 Midwest Collegiate Hockey Association standings
| | Conference | | | | | | | Overall | | | | | |
| | GP | W | L | T | PTS | GF | GA | GP | W | L | T | GF | GA |
|---|---|---|---|---|---|---|---|---|---|---|---|---|---|
| Minnesota–Crookston †* | 16 | 10 | 3 | 3 | 23 | 89 | 48 | 25 | 18 | 4 | 3 | 129 | 75 |
| Marian | 16 | 10 | 4 | 2 | 22 | 75 | 33 | 27 | 14 | 11 | 2 | 104 | 80 |
| Lawrence | 16 | 10 | 6 | 0 | 20 | 72 | 67 | 27 | 12 | 15 | 0 | 97 | 113 |
| MSOE | 16 | 4 | 10 | 2 | 10 | 47 | 77 | 28 | 7 | 18 | 3 | 76 | 129 |
| Northland | 16 | 2 | 13 | 1 | 5 | 33 | 91 | 24 | 3 | 19 | 2 | 53 | 144 |
Championship: February 23, 2003 † indicates conference regular season champion * indicates conference tournament champions

2002–03 Minnesota Intercollegiate Athletic Conference ice hockey standings
| | Conference | | | | | | | Overall | | | | | |
| | GP | W | L | T | Pts | GF | GA | GP | W | L | T | GF | GA |
|---|---|---|---|---|---|---|---|---|---|---|---|---|---|
| Saint John's †* | 16 | 13 | 2 | 1 | 27 | 76 | 47 | 28 | 20 | 7 | 1 | 116 | 89 |
| St. Thomas | 16 | 10 | 5 | 1 | 21 | 58 | 31 | 27 | 16 | 9 | 2 | 97 | 59 |
| Augsburg | 16 | 10 | 6 | 0 | 20 | 64 | 56 | 26 | 17 | 9 | 0 | 114 | 92 |
| Gustavus Adolphus | 16 | 8 | 7 | 1 | 17 | 67 | 40 | 27 | 14 | 12 | 1 | 114 | 75 |
| Concordia (MN) | 16 | 7 | 7 | 2 | 16 | 55 | 62 | 26 | 13 | 11 | 2 | 92 | 103 |
| Hamline | 16 | 7 | 7 | 2 | 16 | 55 | 70 | 25 | 9 | 13 | 3 | 76 | 106 |
| St. Olaf | 16 | 6 | 9 | 1 | 13 | 59 | 57 | 25 | 10 | 13 | 2 | 90 | 85 |
| Saint Mary's | 16 | 5 | 11 | 0 | 10 | 50 | 67 | 25 | 11 | 13 | 1 | 98 | 94 |
| Bethel | 16 | 2 | 14 | 0 | 4 | 30 | 84 | 24 | 3 | 21 | 0 | 49 | 136 |
Championship: March 1, 2003 † indicates conference regular season champion * indicates conference tournament champion

2002–03 New England Small College Athletic Conference ice hockey standings
| | Conference | | | | | | | Overall | | | | | |
| | GP | W | L | T | PTS | GF | GA | GP | W | L | T | GF | GA |
|---|---|---|---|---|---|---|---|---|---|---|---|---|---|
| Middlebury † | 19 | 16 | 1 | 2 | 34 | 99 | 33 | 29 | 22 | 5 | 2 | 135 | 63 |
| Trinity * | 19 | 15 | 3 | 1 | 31 | 93 | 43 | 27 | 19 | 6 | 2 | 119 | 73 |
| Colby | 19 | 14 | 4 | 1 | 29 | 88 | 48 | 25 | 18 | 6 | 1 | 125 | 60 |
| Bowdoin | 19 | 11 | 3 | 5 | 27 | 86 | 55 | 24 | 13 | 6 | 5 | 116 | 74 |
| Hamilton | 19 | 10 | 7 | 2 | 22 | 93 | 57 | 26 | 14 | 10 | 2 | 122 | 75 |
| Amherst | 19 | 7 | 8 | 4 | 18 | 70 | 76 | 25 | 7 | 13 | 5 | 78 | 116 |
| Williams | 19 | 8 | 9 | 2 | 18 | 89 | 64 | 25 | 8 | 15 | 2 | 104 | 96 |
| Tufts | 19 | 7 | 10 | 2 | 16 | 78 | 85 | 22 | 7 | 11 | 4 | 87 | 100 |
| Wesleyan | 19 | 7 | 11 | 1 | 15 | 49 | 75 | 23 | 7 | 13 | 3 | 56 | 93 |
| Connecticut College | 19 | 3 | 12 | 4 | 10 | 50 | 87 | 24 | 5 | 15 | 4 | 65 | 105 |
Championship: March 9, 2003 † indicates conference regular season champion * indicates conference tournament champion

2002–03 Northern Collegiate Hockey Association standings
| | Conference | | | | | | | Overall | | | | | |
| | GP | W | L | T | Pts | GF | GA | GP | W | L | T | GF | GA |
|---|---|---|---|---|---|---|---|---|---|---|---|---|---|
| St. Norbert †* | 14 | 12 | 1 | 1 | 25 | 67 | 28 | 31 | 27 | 2 | 2 | 164 | 66 |
| Wisconsin–Superior | 14 | 11 | 2 | 1 | 23 | 63 | 26 | 29 | 21 | 6 | 2 | 129 | 65 |
| Wisconsin–River Falls | 14 | 11 | 2 | 1 | 23 | 78 | 26 | 31 | 23 | 7 | 1 | 164 | 63 |
| Wisconsin–Stevens Point | 14 | 8 | 6 | 0 | 16 | 54 | 44 | 29 | 15 | 12 | 2 | 109 | 89 |
| Lake Forest | 14 | 6 | 7 | 1 | 15 | 44 | 46 | 27 | 13 | 9 | 5 | 100 | 77 |
| St. Scholastica | 14 | 2 | 11 | 1 | 5 | 27 | 77 | 26 | 5 | 20 | 1 | 68 | 138 |
| Wisconsin–Stout | 14 | 2 | 12 | 0 | 4 | 33 | 71 | 27 | 6 | 21 | 0 | 66 | 133 |
| Wisconsin–Eau Claire | 14 | 1 | 12 | 1 | 3 | 33 | 81 | 25 | 1 | 22 | 2 | 57 | 153 |
Championship: March 1, 2003 † indicates conference regular season champion * indicates conference tournament champion

2002–03 State University of New York Athletic Conference ice hockey standings
| | Conference | | | | | | | Overall | | | | | |
| | GP | W | L | T | PTS | GF | GA | GP | W | L | T | GF | GA |
|---|---|---|---|---|---|---|---|---|---|---|---|---|---|
| Oswego State †* | 14 | 10 | 3 | 1 | 21 | 77 | 31 | 33 | 25 | 7 | 1 | 171 | 81 |
| Fredonia State | 14 | 10 | 4 | 0 | 20 | 43 | 25 | 26 | 14 | 12 | 0 | 76 | 57 |
| Plattsburgh State | 14 | 9 | 4 | 1 | 19 | 77 | 35 | 32 | 20 | 9 | 3 | 158 | 92 |
| Potsdam State | 14 | 7 | 6 | 1 | 15 | 45 | 45 | 29 | 14 | 13 | 2 | 100 | 95 |
| Geneseo State | 14 | 7 | 6 | 1 | 15 | 37 | 39 | 25 | 9 | 13 | 3 | 79 | 89 |
| Cortland State | 14 | 3 | 9 | 2 | 8 | 40 | 69 | 27 | 5 | 18 | 4 | 80 | 140 |
| Brockport State | 14 | 3 | 9 | 2 | 8 | 29 | 66 | 25 | 9 | 14 | 2 | 72 | 103 |
| Buffalo State | 14 | 3 | 11 | 0 | 6 | 43 | 79 | 25 | 6 | 18 | 1 | 78 | 123 |
Championship: March 9, 2003 † indicates conference regular season champion * indicates conference tournament champions

Note: Mini-game are not included in final standings

== Player stats ==
=== Scoring leaders ===
GP = Games played; G = Goals; A = Assists; Pts = Points; PIM = Penalty minutes

| Player | Class | Team | GP | G | A | Pts | PIM |
|---|---|---|---|---|---|---|---|
| Brian Yingling | Senior | Lebanon Valley | 27 | 36 | 29 | 65 | 36 |
| Sean Pero | Sophomore | Curry | 25 | 23 | 35 | 58 | 67 |
| Brian Doherty | Sophomore | Curry | 27 | 24 | 32 | 56 | 44 |
| Don Patrick | Senior | Oswego State | 33 | 15 | 41 | 56 | 4 |
| Alex Marinkovich | Junior | Wentworth | 28 | 25 | 28 | 53 | 52 |
| Rob Pascale | Junior | Stonehill | 24 | 27 | 25 | 52 | 8 |
| Manu Mau'u | Sophomore | Johnson & Wales | 25 | 23 | 28 | 51 | 73 |
| Mike Lukajic | Junior | Oswego State | 33 | 33 | 17 | 50 | 14 |
| Travis Banga | Junior | New England College | 25 | 29 | 21 | 50 | 42 |
| Nick Cote | Junior | MCLA | 23 | 33 | 16 | 49 | 22 |
| Brad Carpenter | Sophomore | Wentworth | 28 | 22 | 27 | 49 | 23 |

=== Leading goaltenders ===
GP = Games played; Min = Minutes played; W = Wins; L = Losses; T = Ties; GA = Goals against; SO = Shutouts; SV% = Save percentage; GAA = Goals against average

| Player | Class | Team | GP | Min | W | L | T | GA | SO | SV% | GAA |
|---|---|---|---|---|---|---|---|---|---|---|---|
| J.D. Hadiaris | Senior | Colby | 15 | 839 | 10 | 3 | 1 | 22 | 6 | .925 | 1.57 |
| Marc Scheuer | Junior | Middlebury | 13 | 491 | 6 | 0 | 2 | 13 | 3 | .896 | 1.59 |
| Jamie Vanek | Senior | Wentworth | 17 | 973 | 13 | 2 | 1 | 27 | 4 | .941 | 1.66 |
| Dan Meneghin | Freshman | Wisconsin–River Falls | 14 | 839 | 13 | 1 | 0 | 24 | 2 | .927 | 1.72 |
| Mike Boudreau | Freshman | Norwich | 10 | 455 | 6 | 0 | 0 | 14 | 1 | .929 | 1.84 |
| Zachary Sikich | Sophomore | St. Thomas | 25 | 724 | 8 | 4 | 1 | 23 | 4 | .930 | 1.90 |
| Bob Berg | Sophomore | Marian | 11 | 603 | 8 | 0 | 1 | 20 | 2 | .912 | 1.99 |
| Jacque Vezina | Senior | Wisconsin–River Falls | 17 | 1022 | 10 | 6 | 1 | 34 | 4 | .923 | 1.99 |
| Nathan Ziemski | Junior | Wisconsin–Superior | 26 | 1564 | 20 | 5 | 1 | 55 | 5 | .917 | 2.11 |
| Eric Van Den Bosch | Freshman | St. Norbert | 10 | 565 | 8 | 1 | 0 | 20 | 0 | .898 | 2.12 |

== 2003 NCAA Tournament ==
First Round; March 12
W2 | Wisconsin–River Falls | 2
W3 | Saint John's | 0

Quarterfinals; March 15
W1 | St. Norbert | 5
W2 | Wisconsin–River Falls | 2
Norwich | 6
Trinity | 4
Middlebury | 5
Elmira | 1
Oswego State | 4
Wentworth | 3

Semifinals; March 21
St. Norbert | 3
Norwich | 6
Middlebury | 0
Oswego State | 6

National Championship; March 22
Norwich | 2
Oswego State | 1

Note: * denotes overtime period(s)

== See also ==
- 2002–03 NCAA Division I men's ice hockey season
