= 1993–94 NCAA Division III men's ice hockey season =

- Duration: October 1993– March 19, 1994
- NCAA tournament: 1994
- National championship: Wessman Arena; Superior, Wisconsin
- NCAA champion: Wisconsin–River Falls Falcons
- Sid Watson Award: Ray Alcindor (Middlebury)

The 1993–94 NCAA Division III men's ice hockey season began in October 1993 and concluded on March 19 of the following year. This was the 21st season of Division III college ice hockey.

The Presidents of the NESCAC member schools held a vote in 1994 and changed their rules to allow all non-football teams to compete in national tournaments. Though the NESCAC did not sponsor ice hockey at the time, the nine ECAC East schools who were members of NESCAC were now permitted to accept bids to the NCAA Division III Men's Ice Hockey Championship. In part of the new rules, NESCAC members were only allowed to participate in one postseason tournament and, as a result, the teams that finished with leading records would tend to opt out of the conference tournament and hope to receive a bid to the national tournament.

== Regular season ==
=== Season tournaments ===
Tournament	Dates	Teams	Champion
RIT Tournament	October 29–30	4	RIT
Cardinal Classic	November 5–6	4	Plattsburgh State
Canisius Invitational	November 13–14	4	Canisius
Elmira Tournament	November 13–14	4	Elmira
Curry Thanksgiving Classic	November 19–20	4	
Holy Cross Tournament	November 27–28	4	Holy Cross
Codfish Bowl	December 29–30	4	Salem State
Middlebury Tournament		4	Middlebury
Spurrier Invitational	January 14–15	4	

=== Standings ===
1993–94 ECAC East standings
	Conference							Overall					
	GP	W	L	T	PTS	GF	GA	GP	W	L	T	GF	GA
Williams †	17	13	4	0	26			22	17	5	0		
Salem State †*	17	12	3	2	26	89	49	32	23	6	3	181	95
Bowdoin †	17	12	3	2	26			26	18	5	3		
Connecticut	17	11	3	3	25	98	64	26	15	8	3	137	101
Saint Anselm	17	11	3	3	25			25	15	6	4	138	93
Hamilton	17	11	6	0	22			25	17	7	1		
Colby	17	10	5	2	22								
American International	17	10	7	0	20			26	14	12	0		
Holy Cross	17	10	7	0	20	61	53	26	13	13	0	93	95
Middlebury	17	9	8	0	18	75	75	24	13	11	0	107	91
Norwich	17	8	9	0	16	76	79	23	11	11	1	113	101
Trinity	17	5	10	2	12			23	8	13	2	65	105
Amherst	17	5	10	2	12			22	6	14	2		
Babson	17	5	11	1	11	67	92	23	11	11	1	96	107
Connecticut College	17	4	12	1	9	50	76	24	10	13	1	85	94
North Adams State	17	3	13	1	7			23	5	16	2		
Massachusetts–Boston	17	3	14	0	6	64	112	22	3	19	0	80	150
New England College	17	1	15	1	3			24	3	20	1		
Championship: March 5, 1994 † indicates conference regular season champion * indicates conference tournament champion

1993–94 ECAC North/South/Central standings
	Division							Overall					
	GP	W	L	T	Pct.	GF	GA	GP	W	L	T	GF	GA
Central Division
Massachusetts–Dartmouth ~	14	13	1	0	26			24	18	5	1		
Assumption	14	12	2	0	24			27	19	8	0		
Tufts	14	7	6	1	15			23	9	13	1		
Bentley	14	7	6	1	15	62	71	24	13	10	1	107	121
New Hampshire College	14	5	9	0	10	56	67	22	7	15	0	86	118
Stonehill	14	5	9	0	10			23	8	15	0		
Suffolk	14	5	9	0	10			23	9	13	1		
Saint Michael's	14	1	13	0	2	40	100	20	1	19	0	59	142
North Division
Fitchburg State ~*	16	13	2	1	.844			24	18	5	1		
Western New England	16	12	4	0	.750			23	15	7	1		
Plymouth State	16	11	5	0	.688			25	17	8	0		
Framingham State	16	9	5	2	.625			25	13	9	3		
Worcester State	16	6	7	3	.469			24	8	13	3		
Southern Maine	15	6	8	1	.433	58	59	24	8	14	2	85	105
Roger Williams	15	5	9	1	.367								
Curry	16	3	13	0	.188			20	5	15	0		
Nichols	16	2	14	0	.125	70	136	23	4	19	0	105	197
South Division
Skidmore ~†	13	13	0	0	1.000			23	19	4	0		
Fairfield	13	8	4	1	.654			21	14	6	1		
Iona	13	7	5	1	.577			24	9	13	2		
Villanova	13	7	6	0	.538								
Wesleyan	13	6	7	0	.462	79	56	24	8	16	0	108	129
Quinnipiac	13	4	9	0	.308	52	81	24	6	18	0	84	173
Sacred Heart	7	2	5	0	.286			19	4	15	0	70	125
Wentworth	13	1	12	0	.077	20	106	23	3	20	0	59	184
Championship: March 9, 1994; ~ indicates division regular season champions † indicates conference regular season champion * indicates conference tournament champion

1993–94 ECAC West standings
	Conference							Overall					
	GP	W	L	T	PTS	GF	GA	GP	W	L	T	GF	GA
Elmira †	10	9	1	0	18	93	34	29	21	6	2	202	111
Canisius	10	7	3	0	14	56	34	26	17	8	1	141	89
RIT *	10	6	4	0	12	82	33	30	20	8	2	174	97
Mercyhurst	10	6	4	0	12	64	32	25	12	13	0	142	88
Hobart	10	2	8	0	4	37	54	25	5	20	0	86	141
Scranton	10	0	10	0	0	3	142	21	0	21	0		
Championship: March 5, 1994 † indicates conference regular season champion * indicates conference tournament champions

1993–94 NCAA Division III Independent ice hockey standings
	Overall record					
	GP	W	L	T	GF	GA
Lawrence	7	1	6	0		
St. Norbert	20	10	9	1	84	82
St. Scholastica	25	6	17	2	84	123

1993–94 Minnesota Intercollegiate Athletic Conference ice hockey standings
	Conference							Overall					
	GP	W	L	T	Pts	GF	GA	GP	W	L	T	GF	GA
St. Thomas †*	16	11	2	3	25	89	45	29	19	5	5	153	86
Saint John's	16	11	4	1	23	68	44	26	14	11	1	94	84
Saint Mary's	16	11	4	1	23	85	54	25	16	7	2	131	91
Augsburg	16	9	6	1	19	89	57	23	11	11	1	113	100
Concordia (MN)	16	9	6	1	19	83	68	23	12	10	1	108	104
St. Olaf	16	8	6	2	18	66	65	25	10	12	3	104	118
Gustavus Adolphus	16	5	8	3	13	71	65	25	7	14	4	101	105
Hamline	16	1	14	1	3	47	114	23	3	19	1	68	162
Bethel	16	0	15	1	1	49	133	27	4	22	1	103	187
Championship: March 5, 1994 † indicates conference regular season champion * indicates conference tournament champion

1993–94 Northern Collegiate Hockey Association standings
	Conference							Overall					
	GP	W	L	T	Pts	GF	GA	GP	W	L	T	GF	GA
Wisconsin–Superior †*	20	13	4	3	29	82	60	33	23	6	4	154	100
Wisconsin–Stevens Point	20	13	6	1	27	84	58	29	17	9	3	113	85
Bemidji State	20	12	6	2	26	84	71	33	21	9	3	145	109
Wisconsin–River Falls	20	10	6	4	24	89	72	33	21	8	4	149	110
Wisconsin–Eau Claire	20	3	15	2	8	62	100	27	6	19	2	88	129
Lake Forest	20	2	16	2	6	49	89	25	5	18	2	71	106
Championship: February 26, 1994 † indicates conference regular season champion * indicates conference tournament champion

1993–94 State University of New York Athletic Conference ice hockey standings
	Conference							Overall					
	GP	W	L	T	PTS	GF	GA	GP	W	L	T	GF	GA
Fredonia State †*	12	11	0	1	23	89	31	30	25	1	4	223	85
Plattsburgh State	12	9	2	1	19	77	30	29	18	9	2	189	101
Oswego State	12	5	7	0	10	58	49	27	11	14	2	143	127
Potsdam State	12	5	7	0	10	37	51	27	12	14	1	106	101
Brockport State	12	4	7	1	9	30	71	25	10	14	1	93	128
Cortland State	12	3	8	1	7	39	59	23	7	14	2	84	97
Geneseo State	12	2	8	2	6	32	71	25	8	15	2	92	118
Buffalo State ^	-	-	-	-	-	-	-	19	4	11	4	44	97
Championship: March 6, 1994 † indicates conference regular season champion * indicates conference tournament champions^ Buffalo State had been admitted to the SUNYAC ice hockey division but could not begin a conference schedule until 1994–95

Note: Mini-game are not included in final standings

== 1994 NCAA Tournament ==
Quarterfinals; March 11–12
Fredonia State	3	7	-
RIT	3	0	-
Wisconsin–River Falls	4	4	-
Wisconsin–Stevens Point	2	3	-
Salem State	6	4	-
Elmira	4	4	-
Wisconsin–Superior	3	5	-
St. Thomas	3	1	-

Semifinals; March 18
Fredonia State	3
Wisconsin–River Falls	4
Salem State	2
Wisconsin–Superior	3*

National championship March 19
Wisconsin–River Falls	6
Wisconsin–Superior	4
Third-place game
Fredonia State	7
Salem State	4

Note: * denotes overtime period(s)

== See also ==
- 1993–94 NCAA Division I men's ice hockey season
- 1993–94 NCAA Division II men's ice hockey season
