= 2003–04 NCAA Division III men's ice hockey season =

- Duration: October 18, 2003– March 20, 2004
- NCAA tournament: 2004
- National championship: Kreitzberg Arena; Norwich, Vermont
- NCAA champion: Middlebury
- Sid Watson Award: Kevin Cooper (Middlebury)

The 2003–04 NCAA Division III men's ice hockey season began on October 18, 2003 and concluded on March 20, 2004. This was the 31st season of Division III college ice hockey.

== Regular season ==
=== Standings ===
2003–04 ECAC East standings
	Conference							Overall					
	GP	W	L	T	PTS	GF	GA	GP	W	L	T	GF	GA
Division III
Norwich †*	18	16	2	0	32	96	41	28	24	4	0	146	60
New England College	18	12	4	2	26	82	42	27	19	6	2	148	60
Babson	18	9	8	1	19	76	76	28	17	10	1	138	91
Salem State	18	7	9	2	16	66	75	26	12	11	3	105	96
Southern Maine	18	6	11	1	13	57	93	26	11	14	1	98	126
Skidmore	18	5	12	1	11	42	72	26	8	17	1	66	101
Massachusetts–Boston	18	0	18	0	0	29	113	26	3	23	0	56	155
Division II
Saint Anselm	18	12	6	0	24	86	42	27	20	7	0	137	71
Saint Michael's ~	18	4	14	0	8	51	116	27	11	16	0	110	153
ECAC East Championship: March 7, 2004; Northeast-10 Championship: March 6, 2004 † indicates conference regular season champion * indicates conference tournament champion ~ indicates Northeast-10 Tournament champion

2003–04 ECAC Northeast standings
	Conference							Overall					
	GP	W	L	T	PTS	GF	GA	GP	W	L	T	GF	GA
Division III
Curry †	16	16	0	0	32	141	30	29	24	4	1	202	72
Lebanon Valley	16	14	2	0	28	87	29	26	18	8	0	113	68
Wentworth *	16	12	2	2	26	73	35	29	16	9	4	112	84
Framingham State	16	11	3	2	24	51	37	25	12	11	2	72	75
Massachusetts–Dartmouth	16	11	4	1	23	75	53	27	18	8	1	130	109
Fitchburg State	16	7	6	3	17	48	50	25	9	13	3	67	98
Suffolk	16	6	8	2	14	47	62	24	10	12	2	70	84
Salve Regina	15	6	7	2	14	62	51	22	8	12	2	79	96
Nichols	16	5	10	1	11	45	82	23	6	16	1	55	107
Western New England	16	4	9	3	11	53	65	25	9	13	3	80	92
Plymouth State	16	4	11	1	9	54	72	24	8	15	1	81	103
Worcester State	16	3	13	0	6	34	70	23	4	19	0	48	100
Johnson & Wales	16	1	13	2	4	40	95	25	1	22	2	57	190
Division II
Stonehill	16	8	7	1	17	56	61	22	10	11	1	71	84
Southern New Hampshire	15	7	7	1	15	45	50	26	12	13	1	87	96
Assumption	16	7	8	1	15	70	72	25	9	14	2	99	113
Franklin Pierce	16	2	14	0	4	42	109	24	5	19	0	74	155
ECAC Northeast Championship: March 7, 2004; Northeast-10 Championship: March 6, 2004 † indicates conference regular season champion * indicates conference tournament champions ~ indicates Northeast-10 Tournament champion

2003–04 ECAC West standings
	Conference							Overall					
	GP	W	L	T	PTS	GF	GA	GP	W	L	T	GF	GA
Hobart †*	10	7	2	1	15	38	31	28	15	8	5	109	99
Manhattanville	10	6	2	2	14	42	25	22	15	5	2	98	52
RIT	10	6	2	2	14	57	51	25	13	7	5	118	77
Utica	10	4	5	1	9	37	35	26	15	10	1	120	85
Elmira	10	4	6	0	8	45	42	25	11	12	2	117	98
Neumann	10	0	10	0	0	24	79	25	3	21	1	74	143
Championship: March 6, 2004 † indicates conference regular season champion * indicates conference tournament champions

2003–04 NCAA Division III Independent ice hockey standings
	Overall record					
	GP	W	L	T	GF	GA
Castleton State	19	0	19	0	24	177
Finlandia	7	3	4	0	41	33
Scranton	3	0	3	0	4	13

2003–04 Midwest Collegiate Hockey Association standings
	Conference							Overall					
	GP	W	L	T	PTS	GF	GA	GP	W	L	T	GF	GA
Marian †	16	14	2	0	28	76	26	27	17	10	0	101	61
Minnesota–Crookston *	16	10	5	1	21	71	48	27	13	11	3	104	96
MSOE	16	9	7	0	18	60	54	27	10	17	0	75	115
Lawrence	16	3	12	1	7	43	66	28	4	23	1	98	140
Northland	16	2	12	2	6	44	100	26	3	21	2	72	179
Championship: February 29, 2004 † indicates conference regular season champion * indicates conference tournament champions

2003–04 Minnesota Intercollegiate Athletic Conference ice hockey standings
	Conference							Overall					
	GP	W	L	T	Pts	GF	GA	GP	W	L	T	GF	GA
Saint John's †	16	15	1	0	30	63	22	27	22	4	1	120	50
St. Thomas *	16	13	2	1	27	72	36	28	17	8	3	106	79
Gustavus Adolphus	16	9	5	2	20	57	40	26	12	11	3	86	73
Saint Mary's	16	8	7	1	17	56	45	26	13	11	2	94	80
St. Olaf	16	7	6	3	17	55	53	27	11	12	4	88	89
Augsburg	16	5	8	3	13	41	60	25	8	13	4	69	98
Concordia (MN)	16	4	10	2	10	41	64	25	5	17	3	66	111
Bethel	16	4	12	0	8	47	61	24	6	17	1	73	102
Hamline	16	1	15	0	2	24	75	25	3	22	0	55	117
Championship: March 7, 2004 † indicates conference regular season champion * indicates conference tournament champion

2003–04 New England Small College Athletic Conference ice hockey standings
	Conference							Overall					
	GP	W	L	T	PTS	GF	GA	GP	W	L	T	GF	GA
Middlebury †*	18	15	3	0	30	94	33	30	27	3	0	152	48
Trinity	18	12	5	1	25	84	45	26	16	9	1	115	67
Bowdoin	18	12	6	0	24	90	51	24	16	8	0	119	66
Colby	18	10	4	4	24	69	44	25	14	7	4	113	66
Williams	18	11	6	1	23	73	54	24	12	9	3	89	74
Hamilton	18	10	6	2	22	77	45	26	15	9	2	110	75
Wesleyan	18	7	8	3	17	48	61	23	9	10	4	65	72
Amherst	18	6	10	2	14	54	64	25	11	11	3	83	82
Tufts	18	4	13	1	9	50	106	24	8	15	1	88	131
Connecticut College	18	2	15	1	5	49	88	24	6	17	1	73	108
Championship: March 7, 2004 † indicates conference regular season champion * indicates conference tournament champion

2003–04 Northern Collegiate Hockey Association standings
	Conference							Overall					
	GP	W	L	T	Pts	GF	GA	GP	W	L	T	GF	GA
St. Norbert †*	14	11	2	1	23	79	35	32	27	3	2	175	55
Wisconsin–River Falls	14	8	3	3	19	54	34	31	21	6	4	108	61
Wisconsin–Superior	14	7	4	3	17	58	41	27	15	8	4	119	72
Lake Forest	14	7	5	2	16	44	34	28	18	6	4	116	63
Wisconsin–Stout	14	5	7	2	12	27	42	27	14	10	3	83	85
Wisconsin–Stevens Point	14	5	7	2	12	33	57	28	13	12	3	92	96
Wisconsin–Eau Claire	14	4	9	1	9	41	53	27	14	12	1	90	85
St. Scholastica	14	1	11	2	4	19	59	27	6	17	4	56	116
Championship: March 6, 2004 † indicates conference regular season champion * indicates conference tournament champion

2003–04 State University of New York Athletic Conference ice hockey standings
	Conference							Overall					
	GP	W	L	T	PTS	GF	GA	GP	W	L	T	GF	GA
Plattsburgh State †*	14	12	0	2	26	77	27	31	23	5	3	142	78
Potsdam State	14	9	4	1	19	65	43	27	11	14	2	113	113
Oswego State	14	9	4	1	19	66	33	31	19	9	3	146	90
Geneseo State	14	8	4	2	18	53	45	26	14	7	5	104	86
Fredonia State	14	6	8	0	12	42	41	29	13	13	3	101	92
Cortland State	14	5	9	0	10	52	77	27	10	16	1	111	143
Buffalo State	14	3	11	0	6	39	72	25	7	18	0	79	119
Brockport State	14	1	13	0	2	32	88	25	5	20	0	66	142
Championship: March 6, 2004 † indicates conference regular season champion * indicates conference tournament champions

Note: Mini-game are not included in final standings

== Player stats ==
=== Scoring leaders ===
GP = Games played; G = Goals; A = Assists; Pts = Points; PIM = Penalty minutes

Player	Class	Team	GP	G	A	Pts	PIM
Kurtis McLean	Junior	Norwich	28	36	21	57	16
Kevin Cooper	Sophomore	Middlebury	30	35	22	57	20
Jason Deitsch	Junior	St. Norbert	32	19	34	53	46
Travis Banga	Senior	New England College	26	24	27	51	22
Bret Adams	Freshman	Curry	29	17	34	51	73
Don Patrick	Junior	Oswego State	31	16	34	50	12
Brian Doherty	Junior	Curry	29	25	24	49	32
Chris Lee	Senior	Potsdam State	27	17	32	49	30
Mike O'Sullivan	Junior	Curry	29	25	23	48	28
Jimmy Sokol	Junior	Utica	26	16	30	46	26

=== Leading goaltenders ===
GP = Games played; Min = Minutes played; W = Wins; L = Losses; T = Ties; GA = Goals against; SO = Shutouts; SV% = Save percentage; GAA = Goals against average

Player	Class	Team	GP	Min	W	L	T	GA	SO	SV%	GAA
Marc Scheuer	Senior	Middlebury	20	1155	17	2	0	26	3	.932	1.35
Adam Hanna	Freshman	Saint John's	18	1080	15	3	0	29	5	.924	1.61
Chancy Colquhoun	Senior	St. Norbert	20	1210	16	2	2	33	7	.931	1.64
Joel Cameron	Junior	Lake Forest	16	969	11	3	2	28	3	.944	1.73
Andrew Scanlon	Sophomore	Wisconsin–River Falls	21	1238	13	4	3	36	3	.937	1.74
Eric Van Den Bosch	Sophomore	St. Norbert	13	721	11	1	0	21	1	.917	1.75
Yen–I Chen	Sophomore	Middlebury	12	674	10	1	0	21	0	.893	1.87
Kevin Schieve	Junior	Norwich	12	707	10	1	0	22	2	.926	1.87
Tim Fewster	Sophomore	SNHU	11	583	6	2	1	22	2	.937	1.90

== 2004 NCAA Tournament ==
First Round; March 10
W2	Wisconsin–River Falls	3*
W3	St. Thomas	2

Quarterfinals; March 13
W1	St. Norbert	3
W2	Wisconsin–River Falls	0
Plattsburgh State	5*
Curry	4
Middlebury	9
Wentworth	1
Norwich	9
Hobart	5

Semifinals; March 19
St. Norbert	4
Plattsburgh State	1
Middlebury	3**
Norwich	2

National Championship; March 20
St. Norbert	0
Middlebury	1*

Note: * denotes overtime period(s)

== See also ==
- 2003–04 NCAA Division I men's ice hockey season
