= 1990–91 NCAA Division III men's ice hockey season =

- Duration: October 1990– March 16, 1991
- NCAA tournament: 1991
- National championship: Murray Athletic Center; Elmira, New York
- NCAA champion: Wisconsin–Stevens Point

The 1990–91 NCAA Division III men's ice hockey season began in October 1990 and concluded on March 16, 1991. This was the 18th season of Division III college ice hockey.

== Regular season ==
=== Season tournaments ===
Tournament	Dates	Teams	Champion
Northeastern Tournament		4	Middlebury
Brockport Invitational	November 2–3	4	Brockport State
Cardinal Classic	November 2–3	4	Plattsburgh State
Geneseo Tournament	November 2–3	4	Geneseo State
RIT Tournament	November 2–3	4	RIT
Northeast-10 Invitational	November 10–11	4	Assumption
McCabe Tournament	November 30–December 1	4	Trinity
Union Invitational	November 30–December 1	4	Elmira
Crusader Classic	December 1–2	4	Connecticut
Elmira Tournament		4	Salem State
Middlebury Tournament		4	Middlebury
Codfish Bowl	December 28–29	4	Salem State
Duracell Challenge	January 2–3	4	
Salem State Tournament	January 4–5	4	Salem State
Spurrier Invitational	January 18–19	4	Wesleyan
SUNYAC Tournament	February 22–23	4	Oswego State

=== Standings ===
1990–91 ECAC East standings
	Conference							Overall					
	GP	W	L	T	Pct.	GF	GA	GP	W	L	T	GF	GA
Middlebury †*	20	17	2	1	.875	119	56	26	22	3	1	144	67
Massachusetts–Boston	21	14	4	3	.738	107	88	26	16	7	3	128	110
Salem State	21	15	5	1	.738			28	21	6	1		
Babson	20	14	6	0	.700	85	53	28	20	8	0	117	72
Connecticut	19	12	5	2	.684	103	84	27	18	7	2	163	115
American International	22	12	8	2	.591			29	16	11	2		
Williams	19	9	6	4	.579			25	15	7	3		
Bowdoin	21	8	11	2	.429			25	11	12	2		
Colby	19	6	9	4	.421			22	9	9	4		
Norwich	22	7	15	0	.318	82	93	26	10	16	0	108	107
Saint Anselm	25	6	18	1	.260	82	133	26	6	18	2	84	135
New England College	18	4	13	1	.250			23	8	14	1		
Holy Cross	21	4	17	0	.190	67	113	28	8	19	1	111	145
North Adams State	20	1	17	2	.100			25	3	20	2		
Championship: March 5, 1991 † indicates conference regular season champion * indicates conference tournament champion

1990–91 ECAC North/South standings
	Conference							Overall					
	GP	W	L	T	Pct.	GF	GA	GP	W	L	T	GF	GA
North Division
Fitchburg State †~	17	17	0	0	1.000	120	41	26	21	5	0	161	87
Southeastern Massachusetts	20	16	2	2	.850			27	19	6	2		
Suffolk	24	20	4	0	.833			27	22	5	0		
Plymouth State	18	11	6	1	.639			22	12	8	2		
Tufts	20	11	7	2	.600			24	12	10	2		
Assumption	21	11	7	3	.595			24	11	10	3		
New Hampshire College	21	10	7	4	.571			21	10	7	4		
Southern Maine	20	10	10	0	.500	74	78	24	11	13	0	89	102
Curry	22	9	10	3	.477			24	9	12	3		
Framingham State	21	8	12	1	.405			23	8	14	1		
Saint Michael's	20	6	12	2	.350	64	85	22	6	14	2	68	101
Stonehill	26	6	20	0	.231			28	6	22	0		
Worcester State	16	3	12	1	.219			21	3	15	3		
Nichols	19	3	16	0	.158	73	131	22	4	18	0	86	151
South Division
Iona †	18	14	2	2	.833			24	16	6	2		
Trinity ~*	20	13	3	1	.794	76	37	26	17	8	1	106	77
Skidmore	22	13	7	2	.636			24	13	9	2		
Amherst	18	11	7	0	.611			26	13	12	1		
Roger Williams	24	13	10	1	.563								
Western New England	22	11	9	2	.545			23	11	10	2		
Fairfield	24	12	10	2	.542			25	12	11	2		
Connecticut College	18	9	9	0	.500	76	66	23	11	12	0	102	99
Wesleyan	22	8	12	2	.409	96	102	24	7	15	2	98	118
St. John's	16	5	8	3	.406								
Bentley	24	9	14	1	.396	109	120	25	10	14	1	113	123
Quinnipiac	22	3	17	2	.182	65	123	24	3	19	2	70	149
Scranton	17	1	15	1	.088			21	2	18	1		
Villanova	16	1	15	0	.063								
Championship: March 9, 1991 † indicates division regular season champions ~ indicates division tournament champions * indicates conference tournament champion

1990–91 ECAC West standings
	Conference							Overall					
	GP	W	L	T	Pct.	GF	GA	GP	W	L	T	GF	GA
Elmira †*	26	23	3	0	.885	200	64	33	27	6	0	237	96
Geneseo State	27	21	3	3	.833			30	23	4	3		
Mercyhurst	18	15	3	0	.833	126	51	32	19	12	1	183	119
Union	23	16	4	3	.761			26	17	6	3		
Plattsburgh State ^	25	18	7	0	.720	162	107	27	19	7	1	176	117
RIT	21	14	5	2	.714	139	80	28	16	10	2	164	110
Fredonia State	24	14	9	1	.604			26	15	10	1		
Oswego State	27	14	12	1	.537			28	14	13	1	149	137
Cortland State	23	10	12	1	.457								
Hamilton	23	8	13	2	.391			23	8	13	2		
Hobart	26	9	15	2	.385	116	134	26	9	15	2	116	134
Canisius	24	8	16	0	.333	85	124	27	9	18	0	96	137
Brockport State	22	6	16	0	.273	97	146	24	8	16	0	114	150
Potsdam State	24	4	20	0	.167			25	5	20	0		
Binghamton	21	3	18	0	.143			23	4	19	0		
St. Bonaventure	24	1	21	2	.083			29	2	25	2		
Championship: March 4, 1991 † indicates conference regular season champion * indicates conference tournament champions^ Plattsburgh State was ineligible for tournament play in 1991 after being put on probation by the NCAA due to rules violations

1990–91 NCAA Division III Independent ice hockey standings
	Overall record					
	GP	W	L	T	GF	GA
Lake Forest	25	18	6	1	114	65
Lawrence	4	0	4	0		
St. Norbert	21	6	15	0	94	143

1990–91 Minnesota Intercollegiate Athletic Conference ice hockey standings
	Conference							Overall					
	GP	W	L	T	Pts	GF	GA	GP	W	L	T	GF	GA
St. Thomas †	16	13	1	2	28	91	33	29	18	8	3	138	85
Gustavus Adolphus *	16	11	3	2	24	98	55	26	17	6	3	155	92
Saint Mary's	16	9	6	1	19	80	59	28	13	14	1	125	108
St. Olaf	16	9	6	1	19	94	64	25	15	9	1	144	95
Concordia (MN)	16	9	7	0	18	90	73	25	14	11	0	141	118
Saint John's	16	8	7	1	17	66	56	25	13	11	1	104	82
Augsburg	16	5	11	0	10	49	62	27	9	16	0	83	113
Hamline	16	3	12	1	7	52	104	25	5	19	1	81	189
Bethel	16	1	15	0	2			24	2	22	0		
Championship: March 2, 1991 † indicates conference regular season champion * indicates conference tournament champion

1990–91 Northern Collegiate Hockey Association standings
	Conference							Overall					
	GP	W	L	T	Pts	GF	GA	GP	W	L	T	GF	GA
Bemidji State †	24	17	4	3	37	130	79	30	21	6	3	161	95
Mankato State †	24	16	3	5	37	122	64	36	23	7	6	175	103
Wisconsin–Stevens Point *	24	16	8	0	32	129	70	36	27	9	0	192	98
Wisconsin–Superior	24	13	11	0	26	121	102	30	17	13	0	163	120
Wisconsin–Eau Claire	24	7	12	5	19	100	121	27	9	13	5	123	127
Wisconsin–River Falls	24	6	15	3	15	69	102	27	6	18	3	73	115
St. Scholastica	24	1	23	0	2	55	188	30	1	29	0	70	239
Championship: March 2, 1991 † indicates conference regular season champion * indicates conference tournament champion

Note: Mini-game are not included in final standings

== 1991 NCAA Tournament ==
Quarterfinals; March 8–10
Wisconsin–Stevens Point	9	6	-
Lake Forest	1	3	-
Babson	4	10	-
Oswego State	1	4	-
Mercyhurst	5	6	1
Elmira	4	7	2*
Mankato State	4	7	-
Gustavus Adolphus	4	2	-

Semifinals; March 15
Wisconsin–Stevens Point	5
Babson	2
Elmira	3
Mankato State	7

National championship March 16
Wisconsin–Stevens Point	6
Mankato State	2
Third-place game
Babson	3
Elmira	2

Note: * denotes overtime period(s)

== See also ==
- 1990–91 NCAA Division I men's ice hockey season
