= 1991–92 NCAA Division III men's ice hockey season =

- Duration: October 1991– March 21, 1992
- NCAA tournament: 1992
- National championship: Ronald B. Stafford Ice Arena; Plattsburgh, New York
- NCAA champion: Plattsburgh State

The 1991–92 NCAA Division III men's ice hockey season began in October 1991 and concluded on March 21, 1992. This was the 19th season of Division III college ice hockey.

== Regular season ==
=== Season tournaments ===
| Tournament | Dates | Teams | Champion |
|---|---|---|---|
| Canisius Invitational | November 1–2 | 4 | Oswego State |
| RIT Tournament | November 1–2 | 4 | RIT |
| USAir Hockey Classic | November 1–2 | 4 | Massachusetts–Lowell |
| Cardinal Classic | November 8–9 | 4 | Plattsburgh State |
| Elmira Tournament | November 22–23 | 4 | Elmira |
| Northeast-10 Invitational | November 30–December 1 | 4 | Bentley |
| McCabe Tournament | December 6–7 | 4 | Trinity |
| Codfish Bowl | December 27–28 | 4 | Salem State |
| Salem State Tournament | | 4 | Salem State |
| Gustavus Holiday Tournament | January 3–4 | 4 | Wisconsin–Superior |
| Middlebury Tournament | January 4–5 | 4 | Connecticut |
| Spurrier Invitational | January 17–18 | 4 | Wesleyan |
| SUNYAC Tournament | February 21–22 | 4 | Plattsburgh State |

=== Standings ===
1991–92 ECAC East standings
| | Conference | | | | | | | Overall | | | | | |
| | GP | W | L | T | Pct. | GF | GA | GP | W | L | T | GF | GA |
|---|---|---|---|---|---|---|---|---|---|---|---|---|---|
| Connecticut † | 23 | 19 | 3 | 1 | .848 | 163 | 83 | 28 | 22 | 4 | 2 | 202 | 96 |
| Middlebury | 23 | 19 | 4 | 0 | .826 | 145 | 58 | 26 | 21 | 5 | 0 | 156 | 67 |
| Salem State | 15 | 12 | 3 | 0 | .800 | | | 29 | 19 | 10 | 0 | | |
| Babson * | 22 | 16 | 3 | 3 | .795 | 97 | 48 | 28 | 21 | 4 | 3 | 131 | 64 |
| Bowdoin | 22 | 14 | 8 | 0 | .636 | | | 25 | 15 | 10 | 0 | | |
| Norwich | 23 | 11 | 9 | 3 | .543 | 82 | 100 | 27 | 13 | 11 | 3 | 100 | 115 |
| Massachusetts–Boston | 18 | 9 | 9 | 0 | .500 | 94 | 90 | 25 | 15 | 10 | 0 | 131 | 111 |
| Holy Cross | 22 | 10 | 12 | 0 | .455 | 85 | 95 | 25 | 13 | 12 | 0 | 104 | 105 |
| American International | 22 | 9 | 11 | 2 | .455 | | | 26 | 11 | 13 | 2 | | |
| Williams | 21 | 8 | 11 | 2 | .429 | | | 23 | 10 | 11 | 2 | | |
| Colby | 21 | 8 | 12 | 1 | .405 | | | | | | | | |
| Saint Anselm | 24 | 8 | 13 | 3 | .396 | 95 | 115 | 24 | 8 | 13 | 3 | 95 | 115 |
| Trinity | 15 | 4 | 9 | 2 | .333 | 37 | 67 | 24 | 10 | 10 | 4 | 91 | 96 |
| Connecticut College | 14 | 1 | 11 | 2 | .143 | 34 | 72 | 23 | 8 | 13 | 2 | 82 | 110 |
| New England College | 20 | 3 | 16 | 1 | .175 | | | 27 | 8 | 18 | 1 | | |
| North Adams State | 20 | 3 | 16 | 1 | .175 | | | 26 | 4 | 19 | 3 | | |
Championship: March 5, 1992 † indicates conference regular season champion * indicates conference tournament champion

1991–92 ECAC North/South standings
| | Conference | | | | | | | Overall | | | | | |
| | GP | W | L | T | Pct. | GF | GA | GP | W | L | T | GF | GA |
North Division
| Assumption † | 20 | 18 | 2 | 0 | .900 | | | 26 | 20 | 6 | 0 | | |
| Fitchburg State ~ | 17 | 14 | 2 | 1 | .853 | 101 | 51 | 27 | 17 | 9 | 1 | 132 | 102 |
| Massachusetts–Dartmouth | 19 | 14 | 5 | 0 | .737 | | | 26 | 17 | 9 | 0 | | |
| Framingham State | 22 | 15 | 7 | 0 | .682 | | | 25 | 16 | 9 | 0 | | |
| Suffolk | 23 | 14 | 8 | 1 | .630 | | | 26 | 15 | 10 | 1 | | |
| Southern Maine | 21 | 12 | 8 | 1 | .595 | 100 | 67 | 27 | 13 | 13 | 1 | 121 | 92 |
| Worcester State | 19 | 10 | 7 | 2 | .579 | | | 21 | 10 | 8 | 3 | | |
| Plymouth State | 20 | 10 | 8 | 2 | .550 | | | 21 | 10 | 9 | 2 | | |
| Saint Michael's | 22 | 11 | 11 | 0 | .500 | 103 | 96 | 22 | 11 | 11 | 0 | 103 | 96 |
| Curry | 22 | 9 | 12 | 1 | .432 | | | 25 | 10 | 14 | 1 | | |
| New Hampshire College | 22 | 9 | 12 | 1 | .432 | | | 23 | 10 | 12 | 1 | | |
| Stonehill | 26 | 6 | 18 | 2 | .269 | | | 26 | 6 | 18 | 2 | | |
| Tufts | 18 | 2 | 13 | 3 | .194 | | | 22 | 3 | 16 | 3 | | |
| Nichols | 19 | 2 | 16 | 1 | .132 | 52 | 138 | 20 | 3 | 16 | 1 | 58 | 138 |
South Division
| Amherst †~* | 15 | 10 | 4 | 1 | .700 | | | 26 | 13 | 11 | 2 | | |
| Western New England | 20 | 13 | 7 | 0 | .650 | | | 23 | 14 | 8 | 1 | | |
| Fairfield | 23 | 14 | 9 | 0 | .609 | | | 28 | 16 | 12 | 0 | | |
| Wesleyan | 20 | 10 | 9 | 1 | .525 | 109 | 92 | 25 | 10 | 13 | 2 | 126 | 128 |
| Iona | 18 | 9 | 9 | 0 | .500 | | | 27 | 10 | 16 | 1 | | |
| Roger Williams | 21 | 10 | 10 | 1 | .500 | | | | | | | | |
| Skidmore | 17 | 8 | 9 | 0 | .471 | | | 23 | 9 | 14 | 0 | | |
| Bentley | 22 | 7 | 12 | 3 | .386 | 85 | 105 | 23 | 7 | 13 | 3 | 87 | 111 |
| Villanova | 19 | 5 | 14 | 0 | .263 | | | | | | | | |
| Quinnipiac | 21 | 5 | 15 | 1 | .262 | 80 | 101 | 24 | 5 | 18 | 1 | 78 | 161 |
| St. John's | 16 | 4 | 12 | 0 | .250 | | | | | | | | |
Championship: March 14, 1992 † indicates division regular season champions ~ indicates division tournament champions * indicates conference tournament champion

1991–92 ECAC West standings
| | Conference | | | | | | | Overall | | | | | |
| | GP | W | L | T | Pct. | GF | GA | GP | W | L | T | GF | GA |
|---|---|---|---|---|---|---|---|---|---|---|---|---|---|
| Plattsburgh State †* | 27 | 24 | 1 | 2 | .926 | | | 36 | 32 | 2 | 2 | 271 | 130 |
| Elmira | 22 | 18 | 4 | 0 | .818 | 172 | 86 | 31 | 21 | 10 | 0 | 204 | 128 |
| Oswego State | 25 | 15 | 8 | 2 | .640 | 146 | 112 | 27 | 15 | 10 | 2 | 151 | 127 |
| Mercyhurst | 21 | 13 | 8 | 0 | .619 | 157 | 87 | 31 | 19 | 12 | 0 | 202 | 115 |
| Fredonia State | 24 | 14 | 9 | 1 | .604 | | | 25 | 15 | 9 | 1 | | |
| Geneseo State | 26 | 15 | 10 | 1 | .596 | | | 27 | 15 | 11 | 1 | | |
| Cortland State | 23 | 13 | 10 | 0 | .565 | | | | | | | | |
| Potsdam State | 23 | 12 | 11 | 0 | .522 | | | 25 | 13 | 11 | 1 | | |
| Hobart | 24 | 12 | 12 | 0 | .500 | 127 | 126 | 25 | 13 | 12 | 0 | 129 | 132 |
| RIT | 24 | 11 | 11 | 2 | .500 | 121 | 110 | 29 | 12 | 15 | 2 | 138 | 141 |
| Canisius | 27 | 11 | 14 | 2 | .444 | 107 | 111 | 28 | 12 | 14 | 2 | 112 | 115 |
| Hamilton | 23 | 8 | 13 | 2 | .391 | | | 24 | 9 | 13 | 2 | | |
| Brockport State | 23 | 6 | 16 | 1 | .283 | 86 | 131 | 24 | 7 | 16 | 1 | 96 | 135 |
| St. Bonaventure | 23 | 4 | 19 | 0 | .174 | | | 25 | 5 | 20 | 0 | | |
| Binghamton | 22 | 2 | 20 | 0 | .091 | | | 23 | 3 | 20 | 0 | | |
| Scranton | 13 | 0 | 13 | 0 | .000 | | | 21 | 2 | 18 | 1 | | |
Championship: March 7, 1992 † indicates conference regular season champion * indicates conference tournament champions

1991–92 NCAA Division III Independent ice hockey standings
| | Overall record | | | | | |
| | GP | W | L | T | GF | GA |
|---|---|---|---|---|---|---|
| Lake Forest | 24 | 10 | 13 | 1 | 78 | 91 |
| Lawrence | 4 | 0 | 4 | 0 | | |
| St. Norbert | 26 | 6 | 19 | 0 | 90 | 197 |

1991–92 Minnesota Intercollegiate Athletic Conference ice hockey standings
| | Conference | | | | | | | Overall | | | | | |
| | GP | W | L | T | Pts | GF | GA | GP | W | L | T | GF | GA |
|---|---|---|---|---|---|---|---|---|---|---|---|---|---|
| St. Thomas †* | 16 | 12 | 3 | 1 | 25 | 80 | 45 | 32 | 20 | 10 | 2 | 137 | 102 |
| Saint Mary's | 16 | 10 | 2 | 4 | 24 | 88 | 44 | 29 | 16 | 8 | 5 | 138 | 83 |
| Gustavus Adolphus | 16 | 10 | 3 | 3 | 23 | 76 | 42 | 28 | 16 | 9 | 3 | 136 | 90 |
| St. Olaf | 16 | 8 | 6 | 2 | 18 | 87 | 61 | 27 | 11 | 14 | 2 | 133 | 117 |
| Augsburg | 16 | 7 | 7 | 2 | 16 | 60 | 72 | 27 | 11 | 12 | 4 | 110 | 138 |
| Concordia (MN) | 16 | 6 | 8 | 2 | 14 | 69 | 78 | 25 | 10 | 13 | 2 | 130 | 111 |
| Saint John's | 16 | 6 | 9 | 1 | 13 | 75 | 71 | 25 | 11 | 12 | 2 | 143 | 104 |
| Hamline | 16 | 5 | 11 | 0 | 10 | 65 | 111 | 24 | 8 | 16 | 0 | 118 | 165 |
| Bethel | 16 | 0 | 15 | 1 | 1 | 45 | 126 | 23 | 2 | 20 | 1 | 82 | 299 |
Championship: March 1, 1992 † indicates conference regular season champion * indicates conference tournament champion

1991–92 Northern Collegiate Hockey Association standings
| | Conference | | | | | | | Overall | | | | | |
| | GP | W | L | T | Pts | GF | GA | GP | W | L | T | GF | GA |
|---|---|---|---|---|---|---|---|---|---|---|---|---|---|
| Wisconsin–Stevens Point †* | 20 | 14 | 4 | 2 | 30 | 105 | 69 | 36 | 25 | 7 | 4 | 202 | 114 |
| Wisconsin–Superior | 20 | 14 | 5 | 1 | 29 | 112 | 78 | 32 | 23 | 8 | 1 | 205 | 116 |
| Mankato State | 20 | 11 | 7 | 2 | 24 | 82 | 87 | 34 | 17 | 14 | 3 | 141 | 151 |
| Bemidji State | 20 | 9 | 8 | 3 | 21 | 91 | 91 | 30 | 16 | 9 | 5 | 152 | 119 |
| Wisconsin–Eau Claire | 20 | 5 | 14 | 1 | 11 | 100 | 121 | 26 | 11 | 14 | 1 | 123 | 122 |
| Wisconsin–River Falls | 20 | 2 | 17 | 1 | 5 | 69 | 104 | 24 | 6 | 17 | 1 | 86 | 111 |
Championship: March 1, 1992 † indicates conference regular season champion * indicates conference tournament champion

Note: Mini-games are not included in final standings

== 1992 NCAA Tournament ==
Quarterfinals; March 13–14
Plattsburgh State | 3 | 8 | -
Elmira | 1 | 1 | -
Wisconsin–Superior | 8 | 4 | -
Mankato State | 7 | 3 | -
Salem State | 6 | 3 | 3
Babson | 4 | 4 | 0
St. Thomas | 4 | 2 | 0
Wisconsin–Stevens Point | 3 | 4 | 1

Semifinals; March 20
Plattsburgh State | 8
Wisconsin–Superior | 5
Salem State | 7
Wisconsin–Stevens Point | 12

National Championship; March 21
Plattsburgh State | 7
Wisconsin–Stevens Point | 3
Third Place Game
Wisconsin–Superior | 6
Salem State | 7*

Note: * denotes overtime period(s)

== See also ==
- 1991–92 NCAA Division I men's ice hockey season
