= 1989–90 NCAA Division III men's ice hockey season =

- Duration: October 1989– March 24, 1990
- NCAA tournament: 1990
- National championship: K.B. Willett Arena; Stevens Point, Wisconsin
- NCAA champion: Wisconsin–Stevens Point

The 1989–90 NCAA Division III men's ice hockey season began in October 1989 and concluded on March 24, 1990. This was the 17th season of Division III college ice hockey.

== Regular season ==
=== Season tournaments ===
Tournament	Dates	Teams	Champion
Potsdam Tournament	October 27–28	4	Mercyhurst
Brockport Invitational	November 3–4	4	Brockport State
Canisius Tournament	November 3–4	4	Geneseo State
Cardinal Classic	November 3–4	4	Plattsburgh State
RIT Tournament	November 3–4	4	RIT
Elmira Tournament	November 17–18	4	Elmira
Northeast-10 Invitational	November 18–19	4	Saint Michael's
Union Tournament		4	
McCabe Tournament	December 1–2	4	Trinity
Codfish Bowl	December 28–29	4	Salem State
Salem State Tournament	January 5–6	4	Middlebury
Spurrier Invitational	January 19–20	4	Assumption
SUNYAC Tournament	February 23–24	4	Plattsburgh State

=== Standings ===
1989–90 ECAC East standings
	Conference							Overall					
	GP	W	L	T	Pct.	GF	GA	GP	W	L	T	GF	GA
Babson †	21	15	2	4	.810	95	47	29	18	3	8	124	70
Middlebury	19	14	4	1	.763	118	69	27	21	5	1	168	90
Bowdoin	18	12	4	2	.722	99	69	26	16	8	2		
American International *	19	12	6	1	.658	121	84	30	18	9	3		
Connecticut	20	11	8	1	.575	105	107	27	15	11	1	139	142
Norwich	21	10	7	4	.571	99	80	26	11	11	4	117	101
Salem State	22	11	10	1	.523	99	95	27	15	11	1		
Massachusetts–Boston	22	8	12	2	.409	88	99	26	11	12	3	118	113
Colby	18	6	10	2	.389	46	70	22	9	11	2		
New England College	20	5	12	3	.325	82	112	27	8	15	4		
Saint Anselm	22	6	15	1	.295	78	104	25	7	17	1	92	118
Williams	14	3	10	1	.250	39	64	22	8	12	2		
North Adams State	23	5	17	1	.239	90	146	27	8	18	1		
Holy Cross	24	5	18	1	.229	67	124	28	7	20	1	91	157
Championship: March 5, 1990 † indicates conference regular season champion * indicates conference tournament champion

1989–90 ECAC North/South standings
	Conference							Overall					
	GP	W	L	T	Pct.	GF	GA	GP	W	L	T	GF	GA
North Division
Fitchburg State †~*	21	17	4	0	.810	122	57	28	21	7	0	153	89
Southeastern Massachusetts	20	16	4	0	.800	101	53	25	17	8	0		
Southern Maine	19	11	6	2	.632	88	56	20	10	8	2	90	74
Assumption	23	14	8	1	.630	122	102	27	15	11	1		
Curry	18	10	6	2	.611	102	78	28	10	16	2		
New Hampshire College	20	11	7	2	.600	88	81	22	12	8	2		
Saint Michael's	20	10	9	1	.525	72	84	21	10	10	1	74	90
Stonehill	25	13	12	0	.520	129	123	26	14	12	0		
Plymouth State	19	7	9	3	.447	88	85	20	7	10	3		
Suffolk	24	10	14	0	.417	122	143	25	11	14	0		
Tufts	19	6	13	0	.316	85	98	22	7	16	0		
Framingham State	22	5	16	1	.250	95	128	25	5	19	1		
Nichols	19	3	14	2	.211	61	104	20	4	14	2	73	115
Worcester State	18	2	16	0	.111	49	127	20	2	18	0		
South Division
Iona †	16	14	2	0	.875	98	57	21	17	4	0		
Trinity	19	16	3	0	.842	122	49	25	18	7	0	143	72
Connecticut College ~	17	14	3	0	.824	110	63	26	16	10	0	143	126
Western New England	21	13	7	1	.643	131	100	22	14	7	1		
Amherst	18	11	7	0	.611	93	72	23	11	11	1		
Roger Williams	25	12	12	1	.500	78	70						
Fairfield	23	9	12	2	.435	82	106	23	9	12	2		
Wesleyan	22	8	12	2	.409	84	105	24	8	14	2	86	115
Skidmore	21	8	12	1	.405	91	104	22	8	13	1		
Quinnipiac	20	8	12	0	.400	77	93	21	8	13	0	80	101
Bentley	24	8	14	2	.375	84	103	24	8	14	2	84	103
Villanova	15	5	10	0	.333	79	89						
St. John's	17	5	12	0	.294	65	106						
Scranton	15	3	11	1	.233			21	5	15	1		
Championship: March 10, 1990 † indicates division regular season champions ~ indicates division tournament champions * indicates conference tournament champion

1989–90 ECAC West standings
	Conference							Overall					
	GP	W	L	T	Pct.	GF	GA	GP	W	L	T	GF	GA
RIT †	20	16	2	2	.850	122	80	29	19	8	2	158	122
Elmira *	23	19	3	1	.848	158	75	33	24	8	1	205	120
Mercyhurst	21	16	3	2	.810	126	68	30	18	8	4	156	103
Geneseo State	26	19	7	0	.731	151	83	34	23	9	2		
Union	22	14	5	3	.705	107	76	27	16	8	3		
Plattsburgh State	26	17	8	1	.673	172	92	35	22	10	3	219	127
Fredonia State	23	13	8	2	.609	118	92	26	17	7	2		
Hamilton	23	13	9	1	.587	118	67	25	13	11	1		
Hobart	24	12	10	2	.542	139	91	24	12	10	2	139	93
Oswego State	26	13	12	1	.519	142	125	28	14	13	1	149	137
Canisius	28	10	14	4	.429	130	120	28	10	14	4	130	120
Cortland State	22	7	14	1	.341	95	109	24	9	14	1		
Potsdam State	25	7	15	3	.340	93	104	25	7	15	3		
Brockport State	22	5	17	0	.227	76	137	24	7	17	0	92	140
St. Bonaventure	19	2	16	1	.132	44	140	27	4	22	1		
Binghamton	23	0	23	0	.000	37	288	25	0	25	0		
Championship: March 5, 1990 † indicates conference regular season champion * indicates conference tournament champions

1989–90 NCAA Division III Independent ice hockey standings
	Overall record					
	GP	W	L	T	GF	GA
Lake Forest	24	14	10	0	142	86
Lawrence	4	0	4	0		
St. Norbert	20	6	14	0	86	119

1989–90 Minnesota Intercollegiate Athletic Conference ice hockey standings
	Conference							Overall					
	GP	W	L	T	Pts	GF	GA	GP	W	L	T	GF	GA
St. Thomas †	16	14	2	0	28	114	40	28	19	8	1	158	92
Gustavus Adolphus *	16	11	3	2	24	85	47	31	20	6	5	154	110
Concordia (MN)	16	10	4	2	22	106	66	24	12	9	3	147	126
Saint Mary's	16	10	6	0	20	92	78	24	14	10	0	131	107
Saint John's	16	9	7	0	18	77	79	24	15	9	0	130	110
St. Olaf	16	7	8	1	15	66	70	25	14	10	1	113	80
Augsburg	16	4	10	2	10	60	88	28	11	15	2	108	135
Hamline	16	2	14	0	4	55	113	22	3	19	0	76	162
Bethel	16	1	14	1	3	44	109	25	1	23	1	71	166
Championship: March 3, 1990 † indicates conference regular season champion * indicates conference tournament champion

1989–90 Northern Collegiate Hockey Association standings
	Conference							Overall					
	GP	W	L	T	Pts	GF	GA	GP	W	L	T	GF	GA
Wisconsin–Stevens Point †*	24	19	2	3	41	116	68	38	28	4	6	196	103
Wisconsin–Eau Claire	24	15	8	1	31	89	118	34	18	13	3	165	142
Mankato State	24	13	9	2	28	97	86	37	15	14	8	137	135
Wisconsin–River Falls	24	11	10	3	25	114	89	29	13	13	3	134	114
Bemidji State	24	11	11	2	24	102	99	28	15	11	2	131	107
Wisconsin–Superior	24	7	16	1	15	87	116	28	8	19	1	103	141
St. Scholastica	24	1	21	2	4	65	145	28	3	23	2	85	171
Championship: March 3, 1990 † indicates conference regular season champion * indicates conference tournament champion

Note: Mini-game are not included in final standings

== 1990 NCAA Tournament ==
Quarterfinals; March 9–11
Elmira	5	2	0
Plattsburgh State	2	4	1
Babson	3	1	1
Geneseo State	3	1	0
Wisconsin–Stevens Point	4	3	-
St. Thomas	4	0	-
Mankato State	4	2	-
Gustavus Adolphus	1	2	-

Semifinals; March 16–17
Plattsburgh State	4	4	2
Babson	4	4	1
Wisconsin–Stevens Point	5	3	-
Mankato State	4	3	-

National Championship; March 23–24
Plattsburgh State	1	6	0
Wisconsin–Stevens Point	10	3	1

Note: * denotes overtime period(s)

== 1990 NHL supplemental draft ==
Round	Pick	Player	College	Conference	NHL team
2	16	Mike Haviland	Elmira	ECAC West	New Jersey Devils

== See also ==
- 1989–90 NCAA Division I men's ice hockey season
