= Buffalo State Bengals =

- University: Buffalo State College
- Conference: State University of New York Athletic Conference, Liberty League
- NCAA: Division III
- Athletic director: Renee Carlineo
- Location: Buffalo, New York
- Varsity teams: 16
- Football stadium: Coyer Field
- Basketball arena: Buffalo State Sports Arena
- Mascot: Benji the Bengal
- Nickname: Bengals
- Colors: Orange and black
- Website: buffalostateathletics.com
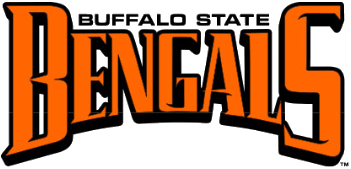

The Buffalo State Bengals are composed of 18 teams representing Buffalo State University in intercollegiate athletics, including men and women's basketball, cross country, ice hockey, soccer, swimming & diving, and track and field. Men's sports include football. Women's sports include volleyball, lacrosse, and softball. The Bengals compete in the NCAA Division III and are members of the State University of New York Athletic Conference for most sports, except for the football team, which competes in the Liberty League.

== Varsity teams ==
Men's sports	Women's sports
Basketball	Basketball
Cross Country	Cross Country
Football	Ice Hockey
Ice Hockey	Lacrosse
Rugby	Rugby
Soccer	Soccer
Swimming & Diving	Softball
Track and Field	Swimming & Diving
Volleyball	Track and Field
	Volleyball

== Former teams ==
=== Baseball ===
Buffalo State has had 6 Major League Baseball draft selections since the draft began in 1965.

Year	Player	Round	Team
1966	Richard Carlson	61	Yankees
1966	Tom Bettecher	60	Yankees
1966	Bert Jones	7	Orioles
1967	Richard Carlson	3	Mets
1969	Daniel Quinn	22	Pirates
1974	Jonathon Walton	19	Pirates
