= Fredonia Blue Devils =

- University: State University of New York at Fredonia
- Conference: State University of New York Athletic Conference
- NCAA: Division III
- Athletic director: Gerald Fisk
- Location: Fredonia, New York
- Varsity teams: 16
- Basketball arena: Steele Hall
- Baseball stadium: Ludwig Field
- Nickname: Blue Devils
- Colors: Blue and White
- Website: fredoniabluedevils.com

The Fredonia Blue Devils (also known as the SUNY Fredonia Blue Devils or the Fredonia State Blue Devils) are composed of 16 teams representing the State University of New York at Fredonia in intercollegiate athletics, including men and women's basketball, cross country, soccer, swimming & diving, and track and field. Men's sports include baseball and ice hockey. Women's sports include lacrosse, softball, tennis, and volleyball. The Blue Devils compete in the NCAA Division III and are members of the State University of New York Athletic Conference.

== Teams ==
Men's sports	Women's sports
Baseball	Basketball
Basketball	Cross country
Cross country	Lacrosse
Ice hockey	Soccer
Soccer	Softball
Swimming and diving	Swimming and diving
Track and field	Tennis
	Track and field
	Volleyball

=== Baseball ===
Fredonia has had 3 Major League Baseball draft selection since the draft began in 1965.

Year	Player	Round	Team
1969	William Eckler	47	Senators
1985	Jeff Shaver	22	Athletics
1985	Chan Galbato	10	Expos

== Athletic facilities ==
Named athletic facilities include:

Venue	Sport(s)	Ref.
University Stadium	Soccer	
University Stadium	Lacrosse	
Dods Hall	Basketball	
Dods Hall	Volleyball	
Blue Devil Field	Softball	
Ludwig Field	Baseball	
Steele Hall	Ice hockey	
Steele Hall	Swimming	
Steele Hall	Tennis	
Outdoor Track	Track and field	
Steele Hall Fieldhouse	(practise / training)	
