= List of Stonehill Skyhawks men's ice hockey seasons =

This is a list of seasons completed by the Stonehill College Skyhawks men's ice hockey team.

== Season-by-season results ==
NAIA/NCAA D-I Champions	NAIA/NCAA Frozen Four	Conference Regular Season Champions	Conference Playoff Champions

Season	Conference	Regular Season (Note: Code explanation; GP—Games Played, W—Wins, L—Losses, T—Tied games, OTW—Overtime Wins, OTL—Overtime Loses, 3/SW—Win in 3 on 3 overtime or shootout, Pts—Points*)														Conference Tournament Results	National Tournament Results
Season	Conference	Conference									Overall					Conference Tournament Results	National Tournament Results
Season	Conference	GP	W	L	T	OTW	OTL	3/SW	Pts*	Finish	GP	W	L	T	%	Conference Tournament Results	National Tournament Results
Division III
Bob Higgins (1978 — 1980)
1978–79	ECAC 3	13	5	8	0	-	-	-	.385	15th	21	9	11	1	.452		
1979–80	ECAC 3	16	11	5	0	-	-	-	.688	8th	23	14	8	1	.630		
Chuck Callan (1980 — 1984)
1980–81	ECAC 3	17	7	9	1	-	-	-	.441	17th	20	7	12	1	.375		
1981–82	ECAC 3	20	9	11	0	-	-	-	.450	17th	23	11	12	0	.478		
1982–83	ECAC 3	17	5	12	0	-	-	-	.294	19th	20	6	14	0	.300		
1983–84	ECAC 3	19	11	8	0	-	-	-	.579	12th	23	12	11	0	.522		
Dennis Chighisola (1984 — 1989)
1984–85	ECAC 3	20	5	15	0	-	-	-	.250	23rd	23	6	17	0	.261		
1985–86	ECAC North/South	21	7	14	0	-	-	-	.333	21st	24	8	16	0	.333		
1986–87	ECAC North/South	20	4	15	1	-	-	-	.225	27th	24	7	17	0	.292		
1987–88	ECAC North/South	25	10	15	0	-	-	-	.400	T–18th	25	10	15	0	.400		
1988–89	ECAC North/South	26	8	17	1	-	-	-	.327	21st	26	8	17	1	.327		
Dante Muzzioli (1989 — 1990)
1989–90	ECAC North/South	25	13	12	0	-	-	-	.520	13th	26	14	12	0	.538		
Fred Allard (1990 — 1991)
1990–91	ECAC North/South	26	6	20	0	-	-	-	.231	23rd	28	6	22	0	.214		
Peter Powers (1991 — 1995)
1991–92	ECAC North/South	26	6	18	2	-	-	-	.269	20th	26	6	18	2	.269		
1992–93	ECAC Central	14	8	6	0	-	-	-	14	T–3rd	23	13	8	2	.609		
1993–94	ECAC Central	14	5	9	0	-	-	-	10	T–5th	23	8	15	0	.348		
1994–95	ECAC Central	14	3	11	0	-	-	-	6	7th	23	7	15	1	.326		
Greg Simeone (1995 — 2000)
1995–96	ECAC Central	14	5	8	1	-	-	-	11	6th	22	10	11	1	.477		
1996–97	ECAC Central	14	5	9	0	-	-	-	10	5th	24	8	16	0	.333		
1997–98	ECAC Central	14	1	12	1	-	-	-	3	7th	21	1	19	1	.071		
1998–99	ECAC Northeast	17	8	8	1	-	-	-	17	T–10th	22	12	9	1	.568		
Division II
1999–00	ECAC Northeast (D-II)	16	5	10	1	-	-	-	11	T–12th	21	6	14	1	.310	Lost Preliminary, 4–5 (Assumption)	
Scott Harlow (2000 — 2007)
2000–01	ECAC Northeast (D-II)	17	9	8	0	-	-	-	18	9th	22	10	11	1	.477	Lost Semifinal, 2–5 (New Hampshire College)	
2001–02	ECAC Northeast (D-II)	15	7	8	0	-	-	-	14	T–9th	25	14	11	0	.560	Won Preliminary, 10–3 (Assumption); Lost Semifinal, 3–4 (Saint Anselm)	
Program drops Chieftains as team name
2002–03	ECAC Northeast (D-II)	16	8	8	0	-	-	-	16	T–8th	24	11	13	0	.458	Lost Quarterfinal, 3–7 (Assumption)	
2003–04	ECAC Northeast (D-II)	16	8	7	1	-	-	-	17	T–6th	22	10	11	1	.477	Won Quarterfinal, 4–3 (Franklin Pierce); Lost Semifinal, 5–6 (OT) (Saint Michael's)	
2004–05	ECAC Northeast (D-II)	15	4	11	0	-	-	-	8	12th	23	8	15	0	.348	Lost Quarterfinal, 1–5 (Southern New Hampshire)	
Program name changed to Skyhawks
2005–06	ECAC Northeast (D-II)	15	8	7	0	-	-	-	16	T–7th	24	14	10	0	.583	Won Quarterfinal, 7–3 (Assumption); Lost Semifinal, 1–12 (Saint Anselm)	
2006–07	ECAC Northeast (D-II)	15	6	8	1	-	-	-	13	T–10th	27	14	12	1	.537	Won Semifinal, 6–2 (Assumption); Won Championship, 5–3 (Saint Anselm)	
Garry Hebert (2007 — 2010)
2007–08	ECAC Northeast (D-II)	16	9	6	1	-	-	-	19	T–6th	25	12	11	2	.520	Won Quarterfinal, 5–2 (Franklin Pierce); Lost Semifinal, 4–5 (OT) (Saint Michael's)	
2008–09	ECAC Northeast (D-II)	17	7	9	1	-	-	-	15	12th	24	10	13	1	.438	Won Quarterfinal, 5–0 (Franklin Pierce); Won Semifinal, 4–2 (New Hampshire College); Lost Championship, 2–3 (Saint Michael's)	
2009–10	Northeast-10	11	2	9	0	-	-	-	2	T–5th	27	10	16	1	.389	Won Quarterfinal, 5–4 (OT) (Franklin Pierce); Lost Semifinal, 3–5 (Saint Anselm)	
Pat Leahy (2010 — 2013)
2010–11	Northeast-10	11	3	7	1	-	-	-	1	T–5th	24	5	18	1	.229	Lost Quarterfinal, 2–5 (Assumption)	
2011–12	Northeast-10	11	6	3	2	-	-	-	6	3rd	25	10	12	3	.460	Won Semifinal, 3–1 (Assumption); Lost Championship, 1–4 (Saint Anselm)	
2012–13	Northeast-10	11	6	5	0	-	-	-	4	T–4th	25	10	15	0	.400	Lost Semifinal, 3–6 (Saint Anselm)	
David Borges (2013 — 2024)
2013–14	Northeast-10	11	11	0	0	-	-	-	10	1st	26	16	10	0	.615	Lost Semifinal, 1–2 (Saint Michael's)	
2014–15	Northeast-10	10	8	0	2	-	-	-	8	T–1st	24	14	6	4	.638	Lost Semifinal, 1–3 (Saint Anselm)	
2015–16	Northeast-10	10	7	1	2	-	-	-	10	1st	26	13	9	4	.577	Won Semifinal, 8–4 (Assumption); Awarded Championship, no contest (Saint Anselm)	
2016–17	Northeast-10	11	6	4	1	-	-	-	5	T–3rd	27	9	14	4	.407	Lost Semifinal, 0–3 (Saint Michael's)	
2017–18	Northeast-10	15	5	9	1	-	-	-	11	5th	25	7	16	2	.320		
2018–19	Northeast-10	15	3	11	1	-	-	-	7	6th	26	8	17	1	.327		
2019–20	Northeast-10	18	8	6	4	-	-	-	20	3rd	29	13	11	5	.534	Won Semifinal, 4–3 (OT) (Saint Michael's); Won Championship, 3–1 (Franklin Pierce)	
2020–21	Season Cancelled																
2021–22	Northeast-10	18	3	12	2	-	-	-	8	7th	28	7	19	2	.286	Won First Round, 5–4 (OT) (Saint Anselm); Lost Semifinal, 2–5 (Assumption)	
Division I
2022–23	Independent	-	-	-	-	-	-	-	-	-	25	17	6	2	.720		
2023–24	Independent	-	-	-	-	-	-	-	-	-	36	2	34	0	.056		
David Berard (2024 — Present)
2024–25	Independent	-	-	-	-	-	-	-	-	-	34	12	22	0	.353		
2025–26	Independent	-	-	-	-	-	-	-	-	-	35	10	22	3	.329	Won UCHC Quarterfinal, 3–0 (Alaska Anchorage); Lost UCHC Semifinal, 4–4 (SOL) (Alaska); Lost UCHC Third Place Game, 3–4 (Long Island)	
Totals											GP	W	L	T	%	Championships	
Regular Season											1135	440	645	50	.410	3 Northeast-10 Championships	
Conference Post-season											34	15	18	1	.456	3 Northeast-10 Tournament Championships	
NCAA Post-season											0	0	0	0	–		
Regular Season and Post-season Record											1169	455	663	51	.411		

* Winning percentage is used when conference schedules are unbalanced.
