= David Borges =

American ice hockey player and coach

Biographical details
- Born: Taunton, Massachusetts, US
- Education: University of Massachusetts Lowell

Coaching career (HC unless noted)
- 1987–1988: Coyle & Cassidy HS (goalie)
- 1988–1995: Coyle & Cassidy HS (assistant)
- 1995–2004: Coyle & Cassidy HS (associate)
- 2004–2013: Coyle & Cassidy HS
- 2013–2024: Stonehill

Head coaching record
- Overall: 106–142–24 (.434)

David Borges is an American ice hockey coach who previously coached Stonehill.

== Career ==
Borges graduated from the University of Massachusetts Lowell in 1985 with a degree in Industrial engineering. Shortly afterwards, he made his first appearance behind the bench as the goaltending coach at Coyle & Cassidy High School in his hometown of Taunton. He was promoted to a full-time assistant the following year and served in that capacity for most of the next 20 years. Borges was named head coach of the program in 2005 and led the team to nine consecutive conference championships. In his time with the Warriors, Borges earned a record of 121–50–8 and was twice chosen to coach at the Massachusetts High School Hockey All-Star Game.

In 2013, Borges got his first opportunity to coach at the college level with Stonehill, a year after his son Dana graduated from the school. Broges was initially brought in on an interim basis 4 days before the Skyhawks' first game and immediately paid dividends for the program. In his first season with the club, he led the team to its first ever conference championship and repeated the feat in each of the next two seasons. While he saw success in the regular season, it took Borges three years to achieve any wins in the postseason. When he did, however, he led Stonehill to the Northeast-10 championship in 2016. Four years later, after a few middling seasons, Borges again led the Skyhawks to a conference championship. He remained with the club after COVID-19 forced Stonehill to cancel all of the 2021 season and will lead the team as it transitions to Division I status beginning with the 2022–23 season.

== College Head coaching record ==
Record table
| Season | Team | Overall | Conference | Standing | Postseason |
|---|---|---|---|---|---|
Stonehill Skyhawks (Northeast-10) (2013–2022)
| 2013–14 | Stonehill | 16–10–0 | 11–0–0 | 1st | Northeast-10 semifinal |
| 2014–15 | Stonehill | 14–6–4 | 8–0–2 | T–1st | Northeast-10 semifinal |
| 2015–16 | Stonehill | 13–9–4 | 7–1–2 | 1st | Northeast-10 Champion |
| 2016–17 | Stonehill | 9–14–4 | 6–4–1 | T–3rd | Northeast-10 semifinal |
| 2017–18 | Stonehill | 7–16–2 | 5–9–1 | 5th | |
| 2018–19 | Stonehill | 8–17–1 | 3–11–1 | 6th | |
| 2019–20 | Stonehill | 13–11–5 | 8–6–3 | 3rd | Northeast-10 Champion |
| 2021–22 | Stonehill | 7–19–2 | 3–12–2 | 7th | Northeast-10 semifinal |
| Stonehill: | | 87–102–22 | 74–43–12 | | |
Stonehill Skyhawks (Division I Independent) (2022–2024)
| 2022–23 | Stonehill | 17–6–2 | | | |
| 2023–24 | Stonehill | 2–34–0 | | | |
| Stonehill: | | 19–40–2 | | | |
| Total: | | 106–142–24 | | | |
National champion Postseason invitational champion Conference regular season champion Conference regular season and conference tournament champion Division regular season champion Division regular season and conference tournament champion Conference tournament champion
