= 2025–26 NCAA Division II men's ice hockey season =

- Duration: October 31, 2025– March 7, 2026
- NCAA tournament: 2026

The 2025–26 NCAA Division II men's ice hockey season began on October 31, 2025, and concluded with the Northeast 10 championship on March 7, 2026. This is the 44th season of second-tier college ice hockey.

== Regular season ==
=== Season tournaments ===
Tournament	Dates	Teams	Champion
Woo Cup	October 31–November 2	4	Worcester State
Bowdoin/Colby Classic	November 29–November 30	4	Bowdoin
Codfish Bowl	January 2–3	4	Massachusetts Boston
The Lobster Pot	January 2–3	4	Bowdoin
Boston Landing Invitational	January 3–4	4	Nichols

=== Standings ===
2025–26 Northeast-10 Conference ice hockey standings
	Conference									Overall					
	GP	W	L	T	OTW	OTL	PTS	GF	GA	GP	W	L	T	GF	GA
Assumption †*	20	15	3	2	0	0	47	90	43	31	22	7	2	133	81
Saint Michael's	20	11	7	2	1	0	34	56	47	31	16	12	3	88	74
Saint Anselm	20	11	7	2	1	0	34	65	48	31	14	13	4	99	95
Post	20	7	12	1	0	3	25	43	52	29	9	19	1	62	77
Franklin Pierce	20	7	13	0	0	0	21	43	85	29	9	20	1	75	136
Southern New Hampshire	20	5	14	1	0	1	17	42	64	26	9	16	1	70	84
Championship: March 7 † indicates conference regular season champion * indicates conference tournament champion

== See also ==
- 2025–26 NCAA Division I men's ice hockey season
- 2025–26 NCAA Division III men's ice hockey season
