= 2023–24 NCAA Division II men's ice hockey season =

- Duration: October 14, 2023– March 2, 2024
- NCAA tournament: 2024

The 2023–24 NCAA Division II men's ice hockey season began on October 14, 2023, and concluded on March 2, 2024. This was the 42nd season of second-tier college ice hockey.

== Regular season ==
=== Season tournaments ===
Tournament	Dates	Teams	Champion
Western Massachusetts Invitational	October 27–28	4	Westfield State
Worcester City Cup	October 27, 29	4	Assumption
Boston Landing Invitational	January 6–7	4	Tufts

=== Standings ===
2023–24 Northeast-10 Conference ice hockey standings
	Conference									Overall					
	GP	W	L	T	OTW	OTL	PTS	GF	GA	GP	W	L	T	GF	GA
Assumption †*	20	16	4	0	3	0	45	79	52	32	25	7	0	125	89
Saint Michael's	20	13	7	0	5	0	34	67	58	29	15	14	0	90	100
Southern New Hampshire	20	10	9	1	1	2	32	54	56	30	14	14	2	79	89
Franklin Pierce	20	10	10	0	1	1	30	64	63	27	12	15	0	79	97
Saint Anselm	20	7	11	2	0	5	28	61	58	30	10	18	2	89	103
Post	20	2	17	1	1	3	9	41	79	29	3	25	1	59	119
Championship: March 2 † indicates conference regular season champion * indicates conference tournament champion

== See also ==
- 2023–24 NCAA Division I men's ice hockey season
- 2023–24 NCAA Division III men's ice hockey season
