= 2023–24 NCAA Division I independent men's ice hockey season =

2023–24 NCAA Division I Independent men's ice hockey season
- Season: 2023–24
- Conference: NCAA Division I Independent
- Division: Division I
- Sport: men's ice hockey
- Duration: October 7, 2023– March 9, 2024
- Number of teams: 6

Regular season

NCAA tournament
- Bids: 0

The 2023–24 NCAA Division I Independent men's ice hockey season was the 130th season of play for varsity ice hockey in the United States. The regular season began on October 7, 2023, and concluded on March 9, 2024.

== Season ==
After being accepted into the NCHC starting in 2024, Arizona State is playing its final season as an independent.

== Coaches ==
=== Records ===
| Team | Head coach | Season at school* | Record at school* |
|---|---|---|---|
| Alaska | Erik Largen | 5 | 64–64–12 |
| Alaska Anchorage | Matt Shasby | 2 | 8–19–1 |
| Arizona State | Greg Powers | 9 | 108–140–18 |
| Lindenwood | Rick Zombo | 2 | 7–22–1 |
| Long Island | Brett Riley | 4 | 26–53–4 |
| Stonehill | David Borges | 10 | 104–108–24 |

* Only varsity seasons are included.

== Standings ==
2023–24 NCAA Division I Independent ice hockey standings
| | Overall record | | | | | |
| | GP | W | L | T | GF | GA |
|---|---|---|---|---|---|---|
| Alaska | 34 | 17 | 14 | 3 | 110 | 86 |
| Alaska Anchorage | 34 | 15 | 17 | 2 | 95 | 105 |
| Arizona State | 38 | 24 | 8 | 6 | 129 | 94 |
| Lindenwood | 28 | 6 | 18 | 4 | 74 | 121 |
| Long Island | 37 | 16 | 20 | 1 | 115 | 103 |
| Stonehill | 36 | 2 | 34 | 0 | 62 | 213 |
Rankings: USCHO.com Top 20 Poll

== Ranking ==
=== USCHO ===
| Team | Pre | 1 | 2 | 3 | 4 | 5 | 6 | 7 | 8 | 9 | 10 | 12 | 13 | 14 | 15 | 16 | 17 | 18 | 19 | 20 | 21 | 22 | 23 | 24 | Final |
|---|---|---|---|---|---|---|---|---|---|---|---|---|---|---|---|---|---|---|---|---|---|---|---|---|---|
| Alaska | NR | NR | NR | NR | NR | NR | NR | NR | NR | NR | NR | NR | NR | NR | NR | NR | NR | NR | NR | NR | NR | NR | NR | NR | NR |
| Alaska Anchorage | NR | NR | NR | NR | NR | NR | NR | NR | NR | NR | NR | NR | NR | NR | NR | NR | NR | NR | NR | NR | NR | NR | NR | NR | NR |
| Arizona State | NR | NR | 18 | 13 | 16 | 16 | 14 | 13 | 12 | 12 | 13 | 12 | 11 | 16 | 18 | 17 | 18 | 17 | 18 | 20 | 20 | 20 | NR | NR | NR |
| Lindenwood | NR | NR | NR | NR | NR | NR | NR | NR | NR | NR | NR | NR | NR | NR | NR | NR | NR | NR | NR | NR | NR | NR | NR | NR | NR |
| Long Island | NR | NR | NR | NR | NR | NR | NR | NR | NR | NR | NR | NR | NR | NR | NR | NR | NR | NR | NR | NR | NR | NR | NR | NR | NR |
| Stonehill | NR | NR | NR | NR | NR | NR | NR | NR | NR | NR | NR | NR | NR | NR | NR | NR | NR | NR | NR | NR | NR | NR | NR | NR | NR |

=== USA Hockey ===
| Team | Pre | 1 | 2 | 3 | 4 | 5 | 6 | 7 | 8 | 9 | 10 | 11 | 13 | 14 | 15 | 16 | 17 | 18 | 19 | 20 | 21 | 22 | 23 | 24 | 25 | Final |
|---|---|---|---|---|---|---|---|---|---|---|---|---|---|---|---|---|---|---|---|---|---|---|---|---|---|---|
| Alaska | NR | NR | NR | NR | NR | NR | NR | NR | NR | NR | NR | NR | NR | NR | NR | NR | NR | NR | NR | NR | NR | NR | NR | NR | NR | NR |
| Alaska Anchorage | NR | NR | NR | NR | NR | NR | NR | NR | NR | NR | NR | NR | NR | NR | NR | NR | NR | NR | NR | NR | NR | NR | NR | NR | NR | NR |
| Arizona State | NR | NR | 19 | 16 | 19 | 17 | 14 | 13 | 13 | 12 | 14 | 13 | 12 | 16 | 18 | 18 | 18 | 17 | 18 | 19 | 19 | NR | NR | NR | NR | NR |
| Lindenwood | NR | NR | NR | NR | NR | NR | NR | NR | NR | NR | NR | NR | NR | NR | NR | NR | NR | NR | NR | NR | NR | NR | NR | NR | NR | NR |
| Long Island | NR | NR | NR | NR | NR | NR | NR | NR | NR | NR | NR | NR | NR | NR | NR | NR | NR | NR | NR | NR | NR | NR | NR | NR | NR | NR |
| Stonehill | NR | NR | NR | NR | NR | NR | NR | NR | NR | NR | NR | NR | NR | NR | NR | NR | NR | NR | NR | NR | NR | NR | NR | NR | NR | NR |

=== Pairwise ===
| Team | 1 | 2 | 3 | 4 | 5 | 6 | 7 | 8 | 9 | 10 | 12 | 13 | 14 | 15 | 16 | 17 | 18 | 19 | 20 | 21 | 22 | 23 | Final |
|---|---|---|---|---|---|---|---|---|---|---|---|---|---|---|---|---|---|---|---|---|---|---|---|
| Alaska | 32 | 25 | 30 | 40 | 13 | 10 | 25 | 26 | 21 | 18 | 20 | 21 | 23 | 22 | 21 | 25 | 26 | 30 | 28 | 25 | 27 | 27 | 25 |
| Alaska Anchorage | 28 | 32 | 23 | 29 | 38 | 40 | 48 | 41 | 50 | 52 | 49 | 50 | 52 | 45 | 44 | 41 | 46 | 41 | 41 | 40 | 41 | 39 | 39 |
| Arizona State | 32 | 52 | 3 | 8 | 18 | 14 | 16 | 20 | 16 | 17 | 16 | 16 | 17 | 17 | 16 | 19 | 17 | 18 | 19 | 18 | 19 | 19 | 19 |
| Lindenwood | 22 | 15 | 40 | 45 | 55 | 53 | 55 | 54 | 59 | 61 | 61 | 60 | 60 | 60 | 60 | 60 | 61 | 62 | 62 | 62 | 62 | 62 | 62 |
| Long Island | 32 | 26 | 43 | 51 | 45 | 51 | 49 | 50 | 44 | 49 | 50 | 53 | 48 | 49 | 50 | 51 | 51 | 49 | 48 | 54 | 52 | 52 | 52 |
| Stonehill | 32 | 56 | 52 | 62 | 64 | 63 | 64 | 64 | 64 | 64 | 64 | 64 | 64 | 64 | 64 | 64 | 64 | 64 | 64 | 64 | 64 | 64 | 64 |

Note: teams ranked in the top-10 automatically qualify for the NCAA tournament. Teams ranked 11-16 can qualify based upon conference tournament results.
