= 2018–19 NCAA Division II men's ice hockey season =

- Duration: October 26, 2018– March 2, 2019
- NCAA tournament: 2019

The 2018–19 NCAA Division II men's ice hockey season began on October 26, 2018 and concluded on March 2, 2019. This was the 37th season of second-tier college ice hockey.

== Regular season ==
=== Standings ===
2018–19 NCAA Division II Independent ice hockey standings
	Overall record					
	GP	W	L	T	GF	GA
Post	25	10	15	0	62	88

2018–19 Northeast-10 Conference ice hockey standings
	Conference							Overall					
	GP	W	L	T	PTS	GF	GA	GP	W	L	T	GF	GA
Saint Anselm †	15	10	4	1	21	55	38	31	16	13	2	94	91
Southern New Hampshire *	15	7	5	3	17	49	35	27	14	9	4	87	62
Saint Michael's	15	7	5	3	17	47	35	27	7	16	4	66	80
Assumption	15	7	5	3	17	45	45	27	15	9	3	81	64
Franklin Pierce	15	5	9	1	11	31	54	26	10	15	1	57	97
Stonehill	15	3	11	1	7	35	55	26	8	17	1	81	92
Championship: March 2, 2019 † indicates conference regular season champion * indicates conference tournament champions

== See also ==
- 2018–19 NCAA Division I men's ice hockey season
- 2018–19 NCAA Division III men's ice hockey season
