= 2007 NCAA Division II men's soccer tournament =

2007 NCAA Division II Men's Soccer Championship
Tournament details
- Country: United States
- Teams: 32

Final positions
- Champions: Franklin Pierce (1st title, 2nd final)
- Runners-up: Lincoln Memorial (1st final)

Tournament statistics
- Matches played: 31
- Goals scored: 95 (3.06 per match)
- Top goal scorer(s): David Clifton, FPU (9)

Awards
- Best player: Offense: David Clifton, FPU; Defense: James Thorpe, FPU

The 2007 NCAA Division II Men's Soccer Championship was the 36th annual tournament held by the NCAA to determine the top men's Division II college soccer program in the United States. Thirty-two teams participated in the tournament.

The Franklin Pierce Ravens defeated Lincoln Memorial, 1–0, at the D-II Championship Festival, held in Orange Beach, Alabama, and hosted by the University of West Florida. David Clifton scored the match's lone goal in the 89th minute to give the Ravens men's team their first national title.

Franklin Pierce, who finished the season 17-2-4, were coached by Marco Koolman.

== Brackets ==
=== Pool 1 ===
First round *Campus sites
Lincoln Memorial	2
Wingate	1
*	Tusculum	1
Carson–Newman	3
*	Northern Kentucky	5
Gannon	2
Lewis	1
SIU Edwardsville	2
*	Lees-McRae	3
Queens (NC)	0
Clayton State	0
Lander	1
*	West Florida	1
Montevallo	2
Tampa	2
Lynn	1

Second round *Campus sites
Lincoln Memorial	2
Carson–Newman	1
*	Northern Kentucky	1
SIU Edwardsville	0
*	Lees-McRae	1
Lander	0
Montevallo	1(6)
Tampa	1(5)

Regional Finals; *Campus sites
Lincoln Memorial	2
*	Northern Kentucky	1
*	Lees-McRae	0
Montevallo	2

Semifinals; November 30; Orange Beach, Alabama
Lincoln Memorial	1
Montevallo	0

=== Pool 2 ===
First round *Campus sites
*	CSU Dominguez Hills	1
Grand Canyon	0
Seattle	0
Sonoma State	2
*	West Texas A&M	2
Fort Lewis	1
Midwestern State	8
Metropolitan State	1
*	East Stroudsburg	0
NYIT	2
Dowling	2
Bridgeport	0
*	Franklin Pierce	5
Le Moyne	0
Southern Conn. St.	1(1)
Mass-Lowell	1(3)

Second round *Campus sites
*	CSU Dominguez Hills	1(2)
Sonoma State	1(4)
*	West Texas A&M	0
Midwestern State	1
NYIT	0
Dowling	4
*	Franklin Pierce	3
Mass-Lowell	1

Regional Finals; *Campus sites
Sonoma State	2(4)
*	Midwestern State	2(5)
Dowling	1
*	Franklin Pierce	2

Semifinals; November 30; Orange Beach, Alabama
Midwestern State	0(2)
Franklin Pierce	0(4)

== Final ==
December 2, 2007

Franklin Pierce	1–0	Lincoln Memorial
David Clifton 88:10' (Francois)	Report 1 Report 2

Orange Beach Sportsplex, Orange Beach, Alabama
Attendance: 512
Referee: Tim Debysingh

== See also ==
- 2007 NCAA Division I men's soccer tournament
- 2007 NCAA Division III men's soccer tournament
- 2007 NAIA men's soccer championship
