= 2009–10 NCAA Division II men's ice hockey season =

- Duration: November 3, 2009– March 6, 2010
- NCAA tournament: 2010

The 2009–10 NCAA Division II men's ice hockey season began on November 3, 2009 and concluded on March 6, 2010. This was the 28th season of second-tier college ice hockey.

The MASCAC began sponsoring men's ice hockey for the 2009–10 season. Five league members joined with two other schools (who became affiliate members) to form the new conference. Because six of the schools had previously been in ECAC Northeast it caused a realignment within that conference which caused the four Division II schools to formally leave the conference. They formed Northeast-10's ice hockey division along with two other schools from ECAC East. The two teams from ECAC East remained members of both conferences from 2009 until 2017 when they finally left the ECAC East (by then called the New England Hockey Conference).

The Northeast-10 became the first formal Division II conference in men's ice hockey since 1983–84. Because the six teams that comprised the conference already played a tournament and there were no other extant Division II programs (Minnesota–Crookston downgraded its program after 2009) the National Tournament was not restarted. The winner of the Northeast-10 tournament has been the de facto Division II champion since 2010.

== Regular season ==
=== Standings ===
2009–10 Northeast-10 Conference ice hockey standings
	Conference							Overall					
	GP	W	L	T	PTS	GF	GA	GP	W	L	T	GF	GA
Saint Anselm †*	5	4	0	1	9	33	12	27	15	11	1	113	91
Assumption	11	8	2	1	7	46	38	25	13	11	1	92	99
Saint Michael's	5	3	1	1	7	27	14	27	7	17	3	81	115
Franklin Pierce	11	4	6	1	3	41	47	25	7	16	2	77	106
Stonehill	11	2	9	0	2	35	58	27	10	16	1	89	113
Southern New Hampshire	11	3	6	2	2	34	47	23	5	15	3	72	116
Championship: March 6, 2010 † indicates conference regular season champion * indicates conference tournament champions Saint Anselm and Saint Michael's remained members of the ECAC East and only played a partial Northeast-10 schedule. As a result only one game between each of the conference members was counted in the standings.

== See also ==
- 2009–10 NCAA Division I men's ice hockey season
- 2009–10 NCAA Division III men's ice hockey season
