= 2012–13 NCAA Division II men's ice hockey season =

- Duration: October 26, 2012– March 2, 2013
- NCAA tournament: 2013

The 2012–13 NCAA Division II men's ice hockey season began on October 26, 2012 and concluded on March 2, 2013. This was the 31st season of second-tier college ice hockey.

The Saint Anselm Hawks placed first during the regular season as well as during the conference tournament.

== Regular season ==
=== Standings ===
2012–13 Northeast-10 Conference ice hockey standings
	Conference							Overall					
	GP	W	L	T	PTS	GF	GA	GP	W	L	T	GF	GA
Saint Anselm †*	5	4	1	0	8	27	9	27	16	8	3	107	73
Franklin Pierce	11	6	4	1	7	33	31	25	9	13	3	71	91
Southern New Hampshire	11	5	5	1	5	30	33	24	7	15	2	62	91
Stonehill	11	6	5	0	4	47	37	26	11	15	0	99	98
Saint Michael's	5	2	3	0	4	16	18	25	8	17	0	66	94
Assumption	11	2	7	2	2	21	46	25	7	16	2	57	100
Championship: March 2, 2013 † indicates conference regular season champion * indicates conference tournament champions Saint Anselm and Saint Michael's remained members of the ECAC East and only played a partial Northeast-10 schedule. As a result only one game between each of the conference members was counted in the standings.

== See also ==
- 2012–13 NCAA Division I men's ice hockey season
- 2012–13 NCAA Division III men's ice hockey season
