= 2017–18 NCAA Division II men's ice hockey season =

- Duration: October 27, 2017– March 3, 2018
- NCAA tournament: 2018

The 2017–18 NCAA Division II men's ice hockey season began on October 27, 2017 and concluded on March 3, 2018. This was the 36th season of second-tier college ice hockey.

== Regular season ==
=== Standings ===
2017–18 NCAA Division II Independent ice hockey standings
	Overall record						
	GP	W	L	T	GF	GA	Ref
Post	25	2	22	1	56	128	

2017–18 Northeast-10 Conference ice hockey standings
	Conference							Overall					
	GP	W	L	T	PTS	GF	GA	GP	W	L	T	GF	GA
Saint Anselm †*	15	11	4	0	22	55	32	27	17	9	1	93	66
Saint Michael's	15	9	5	1	19	43	37	27	15	10	2	85	74
Assumption	15	8	6	1	17	48	46	27	15	10	2	89	87
Southern New Hampshire	15	6	7	2	14	50	41	24	12	9	3	88	63
Stonehill	15	5	9	1	11	34	49	25	7	16	2	60	86
Franklin Pierce	15	3	11	1	7	31	56	26	7	18	1	67	117
Championship: March 3, 2018 † indicates conference regular season champion * indicates conference tournament champions

== See also ==
- 2017–18 NCAA Division I men's ice hockey season
- 2017–18 NCAA Division III men's ice hockey season
