= Northeast-10 men's ice hockey tournament =

- Conference hockey championship
- Sport: Ice hockey
- Conference: Northeast-10 Conference
- Format: Single-elimination
- Played: 1999–present

The Northeast-10 men's ice hockey tournament is an American college hockey tournament, which has occurred annually since 1999. From its inception until 2004, it was known as the ECAC Division II Tournament.

== History ==
After the NCAA stopped holding the Division II Tournament in 1999, the five remaining Division II programs began holding the ECAC Division II Tournament rather than compete in their respective conference tournaments. From its inception the ECAC Division II tournament was the only postseason tournament held by any Division II schools. As such the winner was the de facto Division II champion. Because all of the teams that participated in the tournament were members of the Northeast-10, the tournament was renamed the Northeast-10 Tournament in 2004.

== 2000 ==
Seed	School	Conference	Record
1	New Hampshire College	ECAC Northeast	14–8–1
2	Saint Anselm	ECAC East	10–13–0
3	Saint Michael's	ECAC Northeast	12–13–0
4	Stonehill	ECAC Northeast	6–13–1
5	Assumption	ECAC Northeast	7–17–1

Preliminary; February 29
4	Stonehill	5
5	Assumption	6*

Semifinals; March 2
1	New Hampshire College	5
5	Assumption	3
2	Saint Anselm	4*
3	Saint Michael's	3

Championship; March 4
1	New Hampshire College	1
2	Saint Anselm	7

Note: * denotes overtime period(s)

== 2001 ==
Seed	School	Conference	Record
1	Saint Anselm	ECAC East	-
2	New Hampshire College	ECAC Northeast	13–4–0
3	Stonehill	ECAC Northeast	9–8–0
4	Saint Michael's	ECAC Northeast	8–8–1
5	Assumption	ECAC Northeast	4–12–1

Preliminary; February 24
4	Saint Michael's	5
5	Assumption	2

Semifinals; February 28
1	Saint Anselm	5
4	Saint Michael's	4
2	New Hampshire College	5
3	Stonehill	2

Championship; March 3
1	Saint Anselm	8
2	New Hampshire College	2

Note: * denotes overtime period(s)

== 2002 ==
Seed	School	Conference	Record
1	Saint Anselm	ECAC East	3–0–0
2	Saint Michael's	ECAC East	3–1–0
3	Southern New Hampshire	ECAC Northeast	2–2–0
4	Stonehill	ECAC Northeast	1–2–0
5	Assumption	ECAC Northeast	0–4–0

Preliminary; February 23
4	Stonehill	10
5	Assumption	3

Semifinals; February 26–27
1	Saint Anselm	4
4	Stonehill	3
2	Saint Michael's	2
3	Southern New Hampshire	1

Championship; March 2
1	Saint Anselm	6
2	Saint Michael's	7*

Note: * denotes overtime period(s)

== 2003 ==
Seed	School	Conference	Record	Seed	School	Conference	Record
1	Saint Michael's	ECAC East	4–0–0	4	Stonehill	ECAC Northeast	4–4–0
2	Saint Anselm	ECAC East	3–1–1	5	Assumption	ECAC Northeast	4–5–0
3	Southern New Hampshire	ECAC Northeast	5–3–1	6	Franklin Pierce	ECAC Northeast	0–8–0

Note: A regular season game between Saint Michael's and Stonehill was cancelled

Quarterfinals; March 1–2
4	Stonehill	3
5	Assumption	7
3	Southern New Hampshire	7
6	Franklin Pierce	2

Semifinals; March 5
1	Saint Michael's	6
5	Assumption	1
2	Saint Anselm	3
3	Southern New Hampshire	1

Championship; March 8
1	Saint Michael's	2*
2	Saint Anselm	1

Note: * denotes overtime period(s)

== 2004 ==
Seed	School	Conference	Record	Seed	School	Conference	Record
1	Saint Anselm	ECAC East	5–0–0	4	Southern New Hampshire	ECAC Northeast	2–3–0
2	Saint Michael's	ECAC East	4–1–0	5	Assumption	ECAC Northeast	1–3–1
3	Stonehill	ECAC Northeast	2–2–1	6	Franklin Pierce	ECAC Northeast	0–5–0

Quarterfinals; February 28–29
4	Southern New Hampshire	5
5	Assumption	3
3	Stonehill	4
6	Franklin Pierce	3

Semifinals; March 3
1	Saint Anselm	4
4	Southern New Hampshire	1
2	Saint Michael's	6*
3	Stonehill	5

Championship; March 6
1	Saint Anselm	4
2	Saint Michael's	5

Note: * denotes overtime period(s)

== 2005 ==
Seed	School	Conference	Record	Seed	School	Conference	Record
1	Saint Anselm	ECAC East	5–0–0	4	Assumption	ECAC Northeast	2–3–0
2	Saint Michael's	ECAC East	4–1–0	5	Franklin Pierce	ECAC Northeast	1–4–0
3	Southern New Hampshire	ECAC Northeast	3–2–0	6	Stonehill	ECAC Northeast	0–5–0

Quarterfinals; February 26
4	Assumption	11
5	Franklin Pierce	8
3	Southern New Hampshire	5
6	Stonehill	1

Semifinals; March 2
1	Saint Anselm	4
4	Assumption	1
2	Saint Michael's	3
3	Southern New Hampshire	6

Championship; March 5
1	Saint Anselm	7
3	Southern New Hampshire	3

Note: * denotes overtime period(s)

== 2006 ==
Seed	School	Conference	Record	Seed	School	Conference	Record
1	Southern New Hampshire	ECAC Northeast	4–1–0	4	Saint Michael's	ECAC East	3–2–0
2	Saint Anselm	ECAC East	4–1–0	5	Franklin Pierce	ECAC Northeast	1–4–0
3	Stonehill	ECAC Northeast	3–2–0	6	Assumption	ECAC Northeast	0–5–0

Quarterfinals; February 24–25
4	Saint Michael's	8
5	Franklin Pierce	5
3	Stonehill	7
6	Assumption	3

Semifinals; March 1
1	Southern New Hampshire	6
4	Saint Michael's	3
2	Saint Anselm	12
3	Stonehill	1

Championship; March 4
1	Southern New Hampshire	3
2	Saint Anselm	5

Note: * denotes overtime period(s)

== 2007 ==
Seed	School	Conference	Record	Seed	School	Conference	Record
1	Saint Anselm	ECAC East	4–1–0	4	Southern New Hampshire	ECAC Northeast	3–2–0
2	Stonehill	ECAC Northeast	3–1–1	5	Franklin Pierce	ECAC Northeast	1–4–0
3	Saint Michael's	ECAC East	3–2–0	6	Assumption	ECAC Northeast	0–4–1

Quarterfinals; February 24
4	Southern New Hampshire	4
5	Franklin Pierce	2
3	Saint Michael's	2
6	Assumption	4

Semifinals; February 28
1	Saint Anselm	4*
4	Southern New Hampshire	3
2	Stonehill	6
6	Assumption	2

Championship; March 3
1	Saint Anselm	3
2	Stonehill	5

Note: * denotes overtime period(s)

== 2008 ==
Seed	School	Conference	Record	Seed	School	Conference	Record
1	Saint Michael's	ECAC East	4–1–0	4	Stonehill	ECAC Northeast	3–2–0
2	Saint Anselm	ECAC East	4–1–0	5	Franklin Pierce	ECAC Northeast	1–4–0
3	Southern New Hampshire	ECAC Northeast	3–2–0	6	Assumption	ECAC Northeast	0–5–0

Quarterfinals; March 1
4	Stonehill	5
5	Franklin Pierce	2
3	Southern New Hampshire	5
6	Assumption	3

Semifinals; March 5
1	Saint Michael's	5*
4	Stonehill	4
2	Saint Anselm	8
3	Southern New Hampshire	4

Championship; March 8
1	Saint Michael's	5
2	Saint Anselm	1

Note: * denotes overtime period(s)

== 2009 ==
Seed	School	Conference	Record	Seed	School	Conference	Record
1	Saint Anselm	ECAC East	5–0–0	4	Assumption	ECAC Northeast	2–3–0
2	Southern New Hampshire	ECAC Northeast	3–2–0	5	Saint Michael's	ECAC East	2–3–0
3	Franklin Pierce	ECAC Northeast	2–3–0	6	Stonehill	ECAC Northeast	1–4–0

Quarterfinals; February 28
4	Assumption	4
5	Saint Michael's	5
3	Franklin Pierce	0
6	Stonehill	5

Semifinals; March 4
1	Saint Anselm	4
5	Saint Michael's	7
2	Southern New Hampshire	2
6	Stonehill	4

Championship; March 7
5	Saint Michael's	3
6	Stonehill	2

Note: * denotes overtime period(s)

== 2010 ==
Seed	School	Record	Seed	School	Record
1	Saint Anselm	4–0–1	4	Franklin Pierce	4–6–1
2	Assumption	8–2–1	5	Stonehill	2–9–0
3	Saint Michael's	3–1–1	6	Southern New Hampshire	3–6–2

Quarterfinals; February 27
3	Saint Michael's	7
6	Southern New Hampshire	5
4	Franklin Pierce	4
5	Stonehill	5*

Semifinals; March 3
1	Saint Anselm	5
5	Stonehill	3
2	Assumption	5
3	Saint Michael's	1

Championship; March 6
1	Saint Anselm	10
2	Assumption	1

Note: * denotes overtime period(s)

== 2011 ==
Seed	School	Record	Seed	School	Record
1	Saint Michael's	5–0–0	4	Assumption	5–6–0
2	Saint Anselm	4–1–0	5	Stonehill	3–7–1
3	Franklin Pierce	7–4–0	6	Southern New Hampshire	2–8–1

Quarterfinals; February 26
4	Assumption	5
5	Stonehill	2
3	Franklin Pierce	2
6	Southern New Hampshire	3*

Semifinals; March 2
1	Saint Michael's	5
6	Southern New Hampshire	3
2	Saint Anselm	3
4	Assumption	2

Championship; March 5
1	Saint Michael's	4
2	Saint Anselm	7

Note: * denotes overtime period(s)

== 2012 ==
Seed	School	Record
1	Saint Anselm	3–0–2
2	Assumption	7–3–1
3	Stonehill	6–3–2
4	Saint Michael's	2–2–1

Semifinals; February 25
1	Saint Anselm	1
4	Saint Michael's	0
2	Assumption	1
3	Stonehill	3

Championship; March 5
1	Saint Anselm	4
3	Stonehill	1

Note: * denotes overtime period(s)

== 2013 ==
Seed	School	Record
1	Saint Anselm	4–1–0
2	Franklin Pierce	6–4–1
3	Southern New Hampshire	5–5–1
4	Stonehill	6–5–0

Semifinals; February 23
1	Saint Anselm	6
4	Stonehill	3
2	Franklin Pierce	5
3	Southern New Hampshire	3

Championship; March 2
1	Saint Anselm	5
3	Franklin Pierce	2

Note: * denotes overtime period(s)

== 2014 ==
Seed	School	Record
1	Stonehill	11–0–0
2	Saint Anselm	4–1–0
3	Southern New Hampshire	7–4–0
4	Saint Michael's	2–3–0

Semifinals; February 22
1	Stonehill	1
4	Saint Michael's	2
2	Saint Anselm	1
3	Southern New Hampshire	4

Championship; March 1
4	Saint Michael's	1
3	Southern New Hampshire	4

Note: * denotes overtime period(s)

== 2015 ==
Seed	School	Record
1	Saint Michael's	3–0–2
2	Stonehill	8–0–2
3	Saint Anselm	2–1–2
4	Assumption	4–6–0

Semifinals; February 21
1	Saint Michael's	4
4	Assumption	1
2	Stonehill	1
3	Saint Anselm	3

Championship; February 28
1	Saint Michael's	3
3	Saint Anselm	6

Note: * denotes overtime period(s)

== 2016 ==
Seed	School	Record
1	Stonehill	7–1–2
2	Saint Anselm	4–1–0
3	Southern New Hampshire	4–3–4
4	Assumption	2–6–1

Semifinals; February 20
1	Stonehill	8
4	Assumption	4
2	Saint Anselm	3
3	Southern New Hampshire	0

Championship; February 27
1	Stonehill	†
2	Saint Anselm	†

Note: * denotes overtime period(s)
Note: † The championship game was cancelled due to Saint Anselm team members contracting mumps. The higher-seeded Stonehill team was declared champion.

== 2017 ==
Seed	School	Record
1	Saint Anselm	4–1–0
2	Saint Michael's	4–1–0
3	Stonehill	6–4–1
4	Assumption	5–5–1

Semifinals; February 18
1	Saint Anselm	3
4	Assumption	4
2	Saint Michael's	3
3	Stonehill	0

Championship; February 25
4	Assumption	3**
2	Saint Michael's	2

Note: * denotes overtime period(s)

== 2018 ==
Seed	School	Record
1	Saint Anselm	11–4–0
2	Saint Michael's	9–5–1
3	Assumption	8–6–1
4	Southern New Hampshire	6–7–2

Semifinals; February 24
1	Saint Anselm	3
4	Southern New Hampshire	1
2	Saint Michael's	6*
3	Assumption	5

Championship; March 3
1	Saint Anselm	6*
2	Saint Michael's	5

Note: * denotes overtime period(s)

== 2019 ==
Seed	School	Record
1	Saint Anselm	11–4–0
2	Southern New Hampshire	9–5–1
3	Saint Michael's	8–6–1
4	Assumption	6–7–2

Semifinals; February 23
1	Saint Anselm	2***
4	Assumption	1
2	Southern New Hampshire	3
3	Saint Michael's	2

Championship; March 2
1	Saint Anselm	3
2	Southern New Hampshire	4

Note: * denotes overtime period(s)

== 2020 ==
Seed	School	Record
1	Assumption	12–4–2
2	Saint Michael's	11–5–2
3	Stonehill	8–6–4
4	Franklin Pierce	8–7–3

Semifinals; February 29
1	Assumption	3
4	Franklin Pierce	4*
2	Saint Michael's	3
3	Stonehill	4*

Championship; March 7
4	Franklin Pierce	1
3	Stonehill	3

Note: * denotes overtime period(s)

== 2022 ==
Seed	School	Record	Seed	School	Record
1	Southern New Hampshire	14–4–0–3–1	5	Saint Michael's	7–9–0–0–2
2	Saint Anselm	10–6–2–2–2	6	Franklin Pierce	5–9–2–0–0
3	Assumption	10–7–1–2–1	7	Stonehill	3–12–2–0–1
4	Post	7–9–1–0–1			

First Round; February 26
4	Post	3
5	Saint Michael's	1
3	Assumption	4*
6	Franklin Pierce	3
2	Saint Anselm	4
7	Stonehill	5*

Semifinals; March 1
1	Southern New Hampshire	2
4	Post	3*
3	Assumption	5
7	Stonehill	2

Championship; March 5
4	Post	3
3	Assumption	4

Note: * denotes overtime period(s)

== 2023 ==
Seed	School	Record	Seed	School	Record
1	Saint Anselm	13–5–2–1–0	4	Southern New Hampshire	9–11–0–1–2
2	Saint Michael's	12–7–1–0–1	5	Franklin Pierce	7–11–2–1–0
3	Assumption	11–8–1–0–1	6	Post	4–14–2–1–0

Quarterfinals; February 21
4	Southern New Hampshire	1
5	Franklin Pierce	3
3	Assumption	7
6	Post	2

Semifinals; February 25
1	Saint Anselm	5
5	Franklin Pierce	0
2	Saint Michael's	7
3	Assumption	3

Championship; March 4
1	Saint Anselm	5
2	Saint Michael's	1

Note: * denotes overtime period(s)

== 2024 ==
Seed	School	Record	Seed	School	Record
1	Assumption	16–4–0–3–0	4	Franklin Pierce	10–10–0–1–1
2	Saint Michael's	13–7–0–5–0	5	Saint Anselm	7–11–2–0–5
3	Southern New Hampshire	10–9–1–1–2	6	Post	2–17–1–1–3

Quarterfinals; February 20
4	Franklin Pierce	2
5	Saint Anselm	8
3	Southern New Hampshire	4
6	Post	1

Semifinals; February 24
1	Assumption	7
5	Saint Anselm	5
2	Saint Michael's	1
3	Southern New Hampshire	5

Championship; March 2
1	Assumption	3**
2	Southern New Hampshire	2

Note: * denotes overtime period(s)

== 2025 ==
Seed	School	Record	Seed	School	Record
1	Saint Anselm	16–3–1–0–1	4	Assumption	9–11–0–1–2
2	Saint Michael's	12–8–0–1–0	5	Post	9–11–0–1–1
3	Southern New Hampshire	10–8–2–1–0	6	Franklin Pierce	2–17–1–0–0

Quarterfinals; February 18–19
4	Assumption	3
5	Post	0
3	Southern New Hampshire	1
6	Franklin Pierce	0

Semifinals; February 22
1	Saint Anselm	3
4	Assumption	2
2	Saint Michael's	3
3	Southern New Hampshire	1

Championship; March 1
1	Saint Anselm	1
2	Saint Michael's	5

Note: * denotes overtime period(s)

== 2026 ==
Seed	School	Record	Seed	School	Record
1	Assumption	15–3–2–0–0	4	Post	7–12–1–0–3
2	Saint Michael's	11–7–2–1–0	5	Franklin Pierce	7–13–0–0–0
3	Saint Anselm	11–7–2–1–0	6	Southern New Hampshire	5–14–1–0–1

Quarterfinals; February 18–19
4	Post	4*
5	Franklin Pierce	3
3	Saint Anselm	5*
6	Southern New Hampshire	4

Semifinals; February 22
1	Assumption	2*
4	Post	1
2	Saint Michael's	2
3	Saint Anselm	3***

Championship; March 1
1	Assumption	5
3	Saint Anselm	4

Note: * denotes overtime period(s)

== Championships ==
School	Championships
Saint Anselm	11
Saint Michael's	6
Assumption	4
Stonehill	3
Southern New Hampshire	2
Franklin Pierce	0
Post	0

== See also ==
- ECAC East Men's Tournament
- ECAC Northeast Tournament
