= 2011–12 NCAA Division II men's ice hockey season =

- Duration: October 21, 2011– March 3, 2012
- NCAA tournament: 2012

The 2011–12 NCAA Division II men's ice hockey season began on October 21, 2011 and concluded on March 3, 2012. This was the 30th season of second-tier college ice hockey.

== Regular season ==
=== Standings ===
2011–12 Northeast-10 Conference ice hockey standings
	Conference							Overall					
	GP	W	L	T	PTS	GF	GA	GP	W	L	T	GF	GA
Saint Anselm †*	5	3	0	2	8	28	10	27	14	8	5	101	80
Assumption	11	7	3	1	7	39	42	25	13	11	1	77	89
Stonehill	11	6	3	2	6	40	32	25	10	12	3	78	82
Saint Michael's	5	2	2	1	5	17	17	26	6	18	2	60	113
Franklin Pierce	11	4	5	2	4	40	43	22	5	13	4	60	89
Southern New Hampshire	11	1	10	0	0	26	46	23	2	20	1	48	124
Championship: March 3, 2012 † indicates conference regular season champion * indicates conference tournament champions Saint Anselm and Saint Michael's remained members of the ECAC East and only played a partial Northeast-10 schedule. As a result only one game between each of the conference members was counted in the standings.

== See also ==
- 2011–12 NCAA Division I men's ice hockey season
- 2011–12 NCAA Division III men's ice hockey season
