= 2010–11 NCAA Division II men's ice hockey season =

American college ice hockey season

- Duration: October 29, 2010– March 5, 2011
- NCAA tournament: 2011

The 2010–11 NCAA Division II men's ice hockey season began on October 29, 2010 and concluded on March 5, 2011. This was the 29th season of second-tier college ice hockey.

== Regular season ==
=== Standings ===
2010–11 Northeast-10 Conference ice hockey standings
	Conference							Overall					
	GP	W	L	T	PTS	GF	GA	GP	W	L	T	GF	GA
Saint Michael's †	5	5	0	0	10	30	14	27	11	15	1	96	113
Saint Anselm *	5	4	1	0	8	32	15	26	13	11	2	106	88
Franklin Pierce	11	7	4	0	6	46	34	26	8	18	0	76	135
Assumption	11	5	6	0	4	47	49	27	11	15	1	93	113
Stonehill	11	3	7	1	1	37	54	24	5	18	1	67	102
Southern New Hampshire	11	2	8	1	1	34	60	25	6	17	2	63	161
Championship: March 5, 2011 † indicates conference regular season champion * indicates conference tournament champions Saint Anselm and Saint Michael's remained members of the ECAC East and only played a partial Northeast-10 schedule. As a result only one game between each of the conference members was counted in the standings.

== See also ==
- 2010–11 NCAA Division I men's ice hockey season
- 2010–11 NCAA Division III men's ice hockey season
