= 2016–17 NCAA Division II men's ice hockey season =

- Duration: October 28, 2016– February 25, 2017
- NCAA tournament: 2017

The 2016–17 NCAA Division II men's ice hockey season began on October 28, 2016 and concluded on February 25, 2017. This was the 35th season of second-tier college ice hockey.

== Regular season ==
=== Standings ===
2016–17 NCAA Division II Independent ice hockey standings
	Overall record					
	GP	W	L	T	GF	GA
Post	12	0	12	0	11	107

2016–17 Northeast-10 Conference ice hockey standings
	Conference							Overall					
	GP	W	L	T	PTS	GF	GA	GP	W	L	T	GF	GA
Saint Anselm †*	5	4	1	0	8	20	7	26	12	12	2	78	66
Saint Michael's	5	4	1	0	8	18	14	27	9	16	2	62	96
Stonehill	11	6	4	1	5	34	27	27	9	14	4	73	92
Assumption	11	5	5	1	5	31	34	28	11	15	2	81	103
Southern New Hampshire	11	4	7	0	4	28	44	27	13	14	0	81	98
Franklin Pierce	11	3	8	0	0	28	33	25	9	15	1	67	83
Championship: February 25, 2017 † indicates conference regular season champion * indicates conference tournament champions Saint Anselm and Saint Michael's remained members of the ECAC East and only played a partial Northeast-10 schedule. As a result only one game between each of the conference members was counted in the standings.

== See also ==
- 2016–17 NCAA Division I men's ice hockey season
- 2016–17 NCAA Division III men's ice hockey season
