= 2019–20 NCAA Division II men's ice hockey season =

- Duration: November 1, 2019– March 7, 2020
- NCAA tournament: 2020

The 2019–20 NCAA Division II men's ice hockey season began on November 1, 2019 and concluded on March 7, 2020. This was the 38th season of second-tier college ice hockey.

== Regular season ==
=== Standings ===
2019–20 Northeast-10 Conference ice hockey standings
	Conference							Overall					
	GP	W	L	T	PTS	GF	GA	GP	W	L	T	GF	GA
Assumption †	18	12	4	2	26	62	43	28	15	9	4	91	72
Saint Michael's	18	11	5	2	24	64	54	27	15	9	3	89	83
Stonehill *	18	8	6	4	20	67	51	29	13	11	5	102	88
Franklin Pierce	18	8	7	3	19	59	63	32	16	12	4	103	98
Saint Anselm	18	8	8	2	18	58	56	28	13	13	2	92	85
Southern New Hampshire	18	8	10	0	16	55	59	25	10	15	0	74	85
Post	18	1	16	1	3	38	77	26	5	19	2	69	108
Championship: March 7, 2020 † indicates conference regular season champion * indicates conference tournament champions

== See also ==
- 2019–20 NCAA Division I men's ice hockey season
- 2019–20 NCAA Division III men's ice hockey season
