= 2005–06 NCAA Division III men's ice hockey season =

2005–06 NCAA DIII men's ice hockey: college teams in conferences and tournaments

- Duration: October 15, 2005– March 19, 2006
- NCAA tournament: 2006
- National championship: Murray Athletic Center; Elmira, New York
- NCAA champion: Middlebury
- Sid Watson Award: Adam Hanna (Saint John's)

The 2005–06 NCAA Division III men's ice hockey season began on October 15, 2005 and concluded on March 19, 2006. This was the 33rd season of Division III college ice hockey.

== Regular season ==
=== Standings ===
2005–06 ECAC East standings
	Conference							Overall					
	GP	W	L	T	PTS	GF	GA	GP	W	L	T	GF	GA
Division III
Norwich †*	19	15	2	2	32	97	32	29	22	5	2	151	56
Babson	19	14	5	0	28	76	43	27	17	10	0	98	69
New England College	19	11	5	3	25	55	47	28	19	6	3	111	67
Southern Maine	19	9	8	2	20	62	55	27	12	13	2	84	84
Salem State	19	7	8	4	18	54	64	26	11	11	4	102	86
Skidmore	19	5	13	1	11	55	88	25	6	18	1	68	124
Castleton State	19	1	15	3	5	36	91	26	4	19	3	55	110
Massachusetts–Boston	19	0	17	2	2	29	104	26	0	23	3	39	139
Division II
Saint Anselm ~	19	11	6	2	24	71	49	27	17	8	3	126	69
Saint Michael's	19	4	11	4	12	46	86	26	8	16	2	95	145
ECAC East Championship: March 5, 2006; Northeast-10 Championship: March 4, 2006 † indicates conference regular season champion * indicates conference tournament champion ~ indicates Northeast-10 Tournament champion

2005–06 ECAC Northeast standings
	Conference							Overall					
	GP	W	L	T	PTS	GF	GA	GP	W	L	T	GF	GA
Division III
Massachusetts–Dartmouth †*	15	14	1	0	28	76	23	30	25	5	0	131	49
Curry	15	13	1	1	27	103	36	28	16	11	1	138	84
Plymouth State	15	13	2	0	26	87	34	26	16	9	1	114	83
Nichols	15	10	3	2	22	89	45	27	18	7	2	152	89
Wentworth	15	10	5	0	20	76	54	26	14	12	0	108	112
Johnson & Wales	15	8	7	0	16	69	70	26	10	15	1	89	116
Fitchburg State	15	8	7	0	16	63	46	26	14	11	1	113	85
Salve Regina	15	7	6	2	16	47	51	24	9	12	3	65	88
Suffolk	15	5	9	1	11	45	84	24	6	14	4	81	137
Framingham State	15	2	13	0	4	39	75	23	5	17	1	62	112
Western New England	15	1	12	2	4	39	89	23	4	16	3	65	117
Worcester State	15	2	13	0	4	36	111	24	2	20	2	50	171
Division II
Southern New Hampshire	15	8	5	2	18	69	53	27	13	10	4	114	104
Stonehill	15	8	7	0	16	66	52	24	14	10	0	107	96
Assumption	15	4	10	1	9	55	77	25	5	19	1	88	142
Franklin Pierce	15	0	12	3	3	43	102	24	1	19	4	73	158
ECAC Northeast Championship: March 4, 2006; Northeast-10 Championship: March 4, 2006 † indicates conference regular season champion * indicates conference tournament champions ~ indicates Northeast-10 Tournament champion

2005–06 ECAC West standings
	Conference							Overall					
	GP	W	L	T	PTS	GF	GA	GP	W	L	T	GF	GA
Manhattanville †	15	11	2	2	24	60	35	27	20	5	2	116	65
Hobart	15	10	5	0	20	56	46	28	20	8	0	117	73
Elmira *	15	8	6	1	17	52	41	29	18	9	2	98	73
Utica	15	7	6	2	16	38	32	27	13	11	3	73	66
Neumann	15	6	8	1	13	48	51	25	14	10	1	97	72
Lebanon Valley	15	0	15	0	0	36	85	25	4	21	0	68	130
Championship: March 4, 2006 † indicates conference regular season champion * indicates conference tournament champions

2005–06 Midwest Collegiate Hockey Association standings
	Conference							Overall					
	GP	W	L	T	PTS	GF	GA	GP	W	L	T	GF	GA
MSOE †*	20	17	2	1	35	121	42	27	21	5	1	144	62
Marian	20	13	6	1	27	99	71	27	14	12	1	113	114
Finlandia	20	9	8	3	21	88	88	26	10	13	3	103	114
Lawrence	20	7	9	4	18	71	89	27	9	14	4	89	128
Minnesota–Crookston	20	6	13	1	13	71	111	26	6	18	2	90	157
Northland	20	3	17	0	6	56	105	26	3	23	0	64	143
Championship: March 5, 2006 † indicates conference regular season champion * indicates conference tournament champions

2005–06 Minnesota Intercollegiate Athletic Conference ice hockey standings
	Conference							Overall					
	GP	W	L	T	Pts	GF	GA	GP	W	L	T	GF	GA
St. Thomas †	16	13	2	1	27	69	34	27	17	9	1	100	73
Saint John's	16	11	3	2	24	77	38	26	16	7	3	99	57
St. Olaf *	16	8	5	3	19	48	40	27	12	10	5	84	72
Bethel	16	8	6	2	18	78	47	27	16	9	2	121	84
Gustavus Adolphus	16	9	7	0	18	67	50	26	14	11	1	116	91
Saint Mary's	16	8	8	0	16	49	49	24	9	14	1	71	93
Augsburg	16	5	8	3	13	67	69	25	9	13	3	103	113
Hamline	16	3	11	2	8	40	77	25	4	18	3	56	110
Concordia (MN)	16	0	15	1	1	24	115	25	5	18	2	62	145
Championship: March 4, 2006 † indicates conference regular season champion * indicates conference tournament champion

2005–06 New England Small College Athletic Conference ice hockey standings
	Conference							Overall					
	GP	W	L	T	PTS	GF	GA	GP	W	L	T	GF	GA
Middlebury †*	19	16	2	1	33	90	29	30	26	2	2	137	44
Williams	19	13	3	3	29	78	54	24	14	7	3	92	82
Bowdoin	19	10	6	3	23	67	49	27	17	7	3	109	69
Colby	19	11	7	1	23	71	53	25	15	9	1	99	73
Trinity	19	9	7	3	21	63	52	26	13	10	3	88	73
Amherst	19	9	9	1	19	67	64	25	12	12	1	84	85
Hamilton	19	8	9	2	18	71	73	26	11	12	3	98	99
Wesleyan	19	6	9	4	16	44	41	24	7	13	4	55	61
Tufts	19	6	11	2	14	61	79	24	9	12	3	84	92
Connecticut College	19	3	15	1	7	44	84	24	4	19	1	59	105
Championship: March 4, 2006 † indicates conference regular season champion * indicates conference tournament champion

2005–06 Northern Collegiate Hockey Association standings
	Conference							Overall					
	GP	W	L	T	Pts	GF	GA	GP	W	L	T	GF	GA
St. Norbert †	14	10	2	2	22	57	19	32	25	5	2	150	63
Wisconsin–River Falls	14	9	4	1	19	42	35	27	17	7	3	93	62
Wisconsin–Superior *	14	7	5	2	16	38	35	31	18	10	3	102	81
Lake Forest	14	7	7	0	14	47	44	28	15	13	0	101	82
Wisconsin–Stevens Point	14	6	6	2	14	35	47	27	12	11	4	82	87
St. Scholastica	14	6	7	1	13	39	36	27	15	10	2	106	74
Wisconsin–Stout	14	6	8	0	12	37	47	28	15	13	0	84	91
Wisconsin–Eau Claire	14	0	12	2	2	24	56	27	2	21	4	50	105
Championship: March 4, 2006 † indicates conference regular season champion * indicates conference tournament champion

2005–06 State University of New York Athletic Conference ice hockey standings
	Conference							Overall					
	GP	W	L	T	PTS	GF	GA	GP	W	L	T	GF	GA
Oswego State †	14	10	3	1	21	81	42	27	18	7	2	133	83
Geneseo State *	14	10	4	0	20	57	51	30	19	9	2	117	109
Fredonia State	14	8	3	3	19	49	39	29	17	9	3	113	82
Plattsburgh State	14	8	6	0	16	67	42	32	19	12	1	143	87
Buffalo State	14	8	6	0	16	50	48	26	11	14	1	83	104
Potsdam State	14	6	7	1	13	59	64	26	7	15	4	92	121
Cortland State	14	2	11	1	5	41	77	25	4	19	2	74	127
Brockport State	14	1	13	0	2	33	74	25	4	20	1	64	118
Championship: March 5, 2006 † indicates conference regular season champion * indicates conference tournament champions

Note: Mini-game are not included in final standings

== 2006 NCAA Tournament ==
First Round; March 8
W2	Wisconsin–Superior	2
W3	St. Olaf	1
E6	Geneseo State	2
E7	Massachusetts–Dartmouth	8

Quarterfinals; March 11
W1	St. Norbert	8
W2	Wisconsin–Superior	2
E3	Norwich	1
E4	Hobart	3
E2	Manhattanville	1
E5	Elmira	2**
E1	Middlebury	3
E7	Massachusetts–Dartmouth	1

Semifinals; March 18
W1	St. Norbert	5*
E4	Hobart	4
E5	Elmira	1
E1	Middlebury	2

National Championship; March 19
W1	St. Norbert	0
E1	Middlebury	3

Note: * denotes overtime period(s)

== See also ==
- 2005–06 NCAA Division I men's ice hockey season
