= 2004–05 NCAA Division III men's ice hockey season =

- Duration: October 15, 2004– March 19, 2005
- NCAA tournament: 2005
- National championship: Kenyon Arena; Middlebury, Vermont
- NCAA champion: Middlebury
- Sid Watson Award: Kurtis McLean (Norwich)

The 2004–05 NCAA Division III men's ice hockey season began on October 15, 2004 and concluded on March 19, 2005. This was the 32nd season of Division III college ice hockey.

== Regular season ==
=== Standings ===
2004–05 ECAC East standings
| | Conference | | | | | | | Overall | | | | | |
| | GP | W | L | T | PTS | GF | GA | GP | W | L | T | GF | GA |
Division III
| Norwich † | 19 | 15 | 2 | 2 | 32 | 103 | 37 | 26 | 18 | 5 | 3 | 138 | 57 |
| Babson | 19 | 13 | 3 | 3 | 29 | 87 | 39 | 28 | 20 | 5 | 3 | 141 | 66 |
| Southern Maine | 19 | 11 | 7 | 1 | 23 | 82 | 62 | 27 | 15 | 10 | 2 | 113 | 86 |
| New England College * | 19 | 11 | 8 | 0 | 22 | 83 | 64 | 30 | 18 | 12 | 0 | 131 | 96 |
| Salem State | 19 | 6 | 10 | 3 | 15 | 71 | 86 | 26 | 11 | 12 | 3 | 105 | 109 |
| Skidmore | 19 | 5 | 13 | 1 | 11 | 50 | 89 | 26 | 6 | 19 | 1 | 65 | 126 |
| Massachusetts–Boston | 19 | 2 | 16 | 1 | 5 | 29 | 93 | 24 | 4 | 19 | 1 | 44 | 115 |
| Castleton State | 19 | 0 | 19 | 0 | 0 | 24 | 189 | 25 | 0 | 25 | 0 | 42 | 236 |
Division II
| Saint Anselm ~ | 19 | 10 | 8 | 1 | 21 | 74 | 54 | 27 | 18 | 8 | 1 | 128 | 70 |
| Saint Michael's | 19 | 3 | 14 | 2 | 8 | 56 | 111 | 26 | 8 | 16 | 2 | 95 | 145 |
ECAC East Championship: March 6, 2005; Northeast-10 Championship: March 5, 2005 † indicates conference regular season champion * indicates conference tournament champion ~ indicates Northeast-10 Tournament champion

2004–05 ECAC Northeast standings
| | Conference | | | | | | | Overall | | | | | |
| | GP | W | L | T | PTS | GF | GA | GP | W | L | T | GF | GA |
Division III
| Curry †* | 15 | 14 | 0 | 1 | 29 | 126 | 23 | 28 | 19 | 6 | 3 | 172 | 66 |
| Massachusetts–Dartmouth | 15 | 14 | 1 | 0 | 28 | 100 | 36 | 27 | 22 | 5 | 0 | 155 | 70 |
| Wentworth | 15 | 11 | 2 | 2 | 24 | 73 | 39 | 27 | 15 | 10 | 2 | 110 | 89 |
| Plymouth State | 15 | 9 | 5 | 1 | 19 | 51 | 54 | 25 | 13 | 10 | 2 | 92 | 106 |
| Fitchburg State | 15 | 8 | 6 | 1 | 17 | 53 | 51 | 25 | 12 | 12 | 1 | 84 | 93 |
| Johnson & Wales | 15 | 8 | 7 | 0 | 16 | 70 | 60 | 26 | 9 | 15 | 2 | 98 | 123 |
| Salve Regina | 15 | 7 | 7 | 1 | 15 | 57 | 54 | 25 | 10 | 14 | 1 | 86 | 111 |
| Framingham State | 15 | 5 | 10 | 0 | 10 | 45 | 54 | 23 | 6 | 15 | 2 | 60 | 83 |
| Suffolk | 15 | 3 | 11 | 1 | 7 | 39 | 66 | 22 | 4 | 16 | 2 | 63 | 106 |
| Nichols | 15 | 2 | 12 | 2 | 6 | 46 | 96 | 23 | 4 | 17 | 2 | 76 | 144 |
| Western New England | 15 | 2 | 12 | 2 | 6 | 34 | 78 | 24 | 5 | 16 | 3 | 65 | 119 |
| Worcester State | 15 | 2 | 12 | 1 | 5 | 47 | 92 | 23 | 3 | 19 | 1 | 69 | 144 |
Division II
| Southern New Hampshire | 15 | 9 | 3 | 3 | 21 | 80 | 61 | 28 | 18 | 7 | 3 | 152 | 112 |
| Assumption | 15 | 8 | 5 | 2 | 18 | 56 | 65 | 27 | 12 | 12 | 3 | 101 | 132 |
| Franklin Pierce | 15 | 5 | 9 | 1 | 11 | 49 | 65 | 24 | 6 | 16 | 2 | 76 | 121 |
| Stonehill | 15 | 4 | 11 | 0 | 8 | 39 | 71 | 23 | 8 | 15 | 0 | 69 | 108 |
ECAC Northeast Championship: March 5, 2005; Northeast-10 Championship: March 5, 2005 † indicates conference regular season champion * indicates conference tournament champions ~ indicates Northeast-10 Tournament champion

2004–05 ECAC West standings
| | Conference | | | | | | | Overall | | | | | |
| | GP | W | L | T | PTS | GF | GA | GP | W | L | T | GF | GA |
|---|---|---|---|---|---|---|---|---|---|---|---|---|---|
| Utica † | 12 | 9 | 1 | 2 | 20 | 54 | 34 | 27 | 16 | 5 | 6 | 99 | 74 |
| Manhattanville * | 12 | 8 | 3 | 1 | 17 | 43 | 33 | 26 | 21 | 4 | 1 | 105 | 62 |
| RIT | 12 | 7 | 4 | 1 | 15 | 59 | 36 | 24 | 13 | 10 | 1 | 101 | 83 |
| Elmira | 12 | 6 | 5 | 1 | 13 | 58 | 49 | 26 | 11 | 12 | 3 | 119 | 97 |
| Hobart | 12 | 5 | 5 | 2 | 12 | 40 | 37 | 24 | 14 | 6 | 4 | 88 | 66 |
| Neumann | 12 | 2 | 9 | 1 | 5 | 27 | 55 | 23 | 4 | 17 | 2 | 54 | 95 |
| Lebanon Valley | 12 | 1 | 11 | 0 | 2 | 29 | 66 | 25 | 5 | 19 | 1 | 78 | 116 |
Championship: March 6, 2005 † indicates conference regular season champion * indicates conference tournament champions

2004–05 Midwest Collegiate Hockey Association standings
| | Conference | | | | | | | Overall | | | | | |
| | GP | W | L | T | PTS | GF | GA | GP | W | L | T | GF | GA |
|---|---|---|---|---|---|---|---|---|---|---|---|---|---|
| MSOE † | 16 | 13 | 3 | 0 | 26 | 80 | 39 | 28 | 19 | 9 | 0 | 111 | 79 |
| Lawrence | 16 | 9 | 7 | 0 | 18 | 58 | 55 | 26 | 11 | 13 | 2 | 91 | 106 |
| Minnesota–Crookston * | 16 | 9 | 7 | 0 | 18 | 56 | 59 | 31 | 14 | 15 | 2 | 101 | 111 |
| Finlandia | 16 | 7 | 8 | 1 | 15 | 63 | 69 | 24 | 9 | 14 | 1 | 81 | 101 |
| Marian | 16 | 7 | 8 | 1 | 15 | 67 | 61 | 29 | 10 | 17 | 2 | 102 | 122 |
| Northland | 16 | 2 | 14 | 0 | 4 | 42 | 83 | 27 | 3 | 24 | 0 | 62 | 152 |
Championship: February 26, 2005 † indicates conference regular season champion * indicates conference tournament champions

2004–05 Minnesota Intercollegiate Athletic Conference ice hockey standings
| | Conference | | | | | | | Overall | | | | | |
| | GP | W | L | T | Pts | GF | GA | GP | W | L | T | GF | GA |
|---|---|---|---|---|---|---|---|---|---|---|---|---|---|
| Saint John's † | 16 | 14 | 1 | 1 | 29 | 82 | 28 | 28 | 23 | 3 | 2 | 134 | 48 |
| St. Thomas * | 16 | 12 | 3 | 1 | 25 | 77 | 40 | 31 | 20 | 6 | 5 | 130 | 84 |
| Bethel | 16 | 10 | 6 | 0 | 20 | 72 | 56 | 26 | 17 | 9 | 0 | 113 | 85 |
| St. Olaf | 16 | 8 | 4 | 4 | 20 | 58 | 45 | 27 | 14 | 7 | 6 | 98 | 70 |
| Gustavus Adolphus | 16 | 7 | 8 | 1 | 15 | 67 | 64 | 26 | 10 | 15 | 1 | 100 | 104 |
| Augsburg | 16 | 5 | 8 | 3 | 13 | 57 | 57 | 25 | 8 | 12 | 5 | 86 | 92 |
| Saint Mary's | 16 | 6 | 9 | 1 | 13 | 46 | 57 | 25 | 10 | 14 | 1 | 79 | 82 |
| Concordia (MN) | 16 | 3 | 13 | 0 | 6 | 40 | 78 | 25 | 4 | 20 | 1 | 67 | 127 |
| Hamline | 16 | 1 | 14 | 1 | 3 | 18 | 92 | 25 | 4 | 20 | 1 | 42 | 133 |
Championship: March 5, 2005 † indicates conference regular season champion * indicates conference tournament champion

2004–05 New England Small College Athletic Conference ice hockey standings
| | Conference | | | | | | | Overall | | | | | |
| | GP | W | L | T | PTS | GF | GA | GP | W | L | T | GF | GA |
|---|---|---|---|---|---|---|---|---|---|---|---|---|---|
| Trinity † | 19 | 15 | 2 | 2 | 32 | 101 | 51 | 27 | 21 | 4 | 2 | 142 | 67 |
| Middlebury * | 19 | 13 | 4 | 2 | 28 | 80 | 39 | 30 | 23 | 4 | 3 | 124 | 50 |
| Colby | 19 | 12 | 6 | 1 | 25 | 92 | 51 | 25 | 15 | 8 | 2 | 120 | 65 |
| Bowdoin | 19 | 11 | 5 | 3 | 25 | 88 | 47 | 26 | 17 | 6 | 3 | 125 | 66 |
| Amherst | 19 | 11 | 6 | 2 | 24 | 91 | 59 | 25 | 13 | 10 | 2 | 110 | 80 |
| Williams | 19 | 11 | 7 | 1 | 23 | 75 | 54 | 25 | 11 | 12 | 2 | 87 | 84 |
| Hamilton | 19 | 8 | 8 | 3 | 19 | 65 | 53 | 25 | 9 | 12 | 4 | 76 | 74 |
| Tufts | 19 | 8 | 10 | 1 | 17 | 62 | 78 | 25 | 12 | 12 | 1 | 93 | 101 |
| Connecticut College | 19 | 5 | 13 | 1 | 11 | 49 | 72 | 24 | 7 | 16 | 1 | 64 | 85 |
| Wesleyan | 19 | 4 | 13 | 2 | 10 | 50 | 84 | 24 | 4 | 18 | 2 | 57 | 104 |
Championship: March 6, 2005 † indicates conference regular season champion * indicates conference tournament champion

2004–05 Northern Collegiate Hockey Association standings
| | Conference | | | | | | | Overall | | | | | |
| | GP | W | L | T | Pts | GF | GA | GP | W | L | T | GF | GA |
|---|---|---|---|---|---|---|---|---|---|---|---|---|---|
| St. Norbert †* | 14 | 12 | 0 | 2 | 26 | 64 | 25 | 30 | 24 | 3 | 3 | 147 | 67 |
| Wisconsin–Superior | 14 | 9 | 2 | 3 | 21 | 61 | 32 | 29 | 19 | 3 | 7 | 135 | 68 |
| Wisconsin–River Falls | 14 | 9 | 5 | 0 | 18 | 44 | 34 | 28 | 17 | 9 | 2 | 103 | 69 |
| Wisconsin–Stevens Point | 14 | 7 | 6 | 1 | 15 | 63 | 58 | 27 | 12 | 12 | 3 | 102 | 102 |
| Lake Forest | 14 | 7 | 7 | 0 | 14 | 41 | 41 | 28 | 13 | 14 | 1 | 87 | 88 |
| Wisconsin–Stout | 14 | 2 | 9 | 3 | 7 | 34 | 63 | 27 | 10 | 13 | 4 | 92 | 106 |
| St. Scholastica | 14 | 2 | 10 | 2 | 6 | 33 | 54 | 27 | 5 | 17 | 5 | 71 | 111 |
| Wisconsin–Eau Claire | 14 | 1 | 10 | 3 | 5 | 35 | 68 | 27 | 8 | 15 | 4 | 90 | 113 |
Championship: March 5, 2005 † indicates conference regular season champion * indicates conference tournament champion

2004–05 State University of New York Athletic Conference ice hockey standings
| | Conference | | | | | | | Overall | | | | | |
| | GP | W | L | T | PTS | GF | GA | GP | W | L | T | GF | GA |
|---|---|---|---|---|---|---|---|---|---|---|---|---|---|
| Oswego State † | 14 | 11 | 3 | 0 | 22 | 71 | 36 | 27 | 18 | 6 | 3 | 119 | 66 |
| Geneseo State * | 14 | 10 | 3 | 1 | 21 | 69 | 43 | 29 | 18 | 7 | 4 | 125 | 86 |
| Fredonia State | 14 | 9 | 3 | 2 | 20 | 55 | 41 | 27 | 16 | 6 | 5 | 101 | 80 |
| Plattsburgh State | 14 | 7 | 7 | 0 | 14 | 51 | 43 | 31 | 18 | 13 | 0 | 112 | 90 |
| Potsdam State | 14 | 6 | 6 | 2 | 14 | 57 | 43 | 27 | 10 | 14 | 3 | 99 | 115 |
| Cortland State | 14 | 5 | 8 | 1 | 11 | 45 | 63 | 27 | 11 | 14 | 2 | 96 | 117 |
| Brockport State | 14 | 2 | 11 | 1 | 5 | 39 | 72 | 25 | 8 | 16 | 1 | 72 | 105 |
| Buffalo State | 14 | 1 | 10 | 2 | 5 | 44 | 71 | 25 | 5 | 17 | 3 | 77 | 116 |
Championship: March 5, 2005 † indicates conference regular season champion * indicates conference tournament champions

Note: Mini-game are not included in final standings

== 2005 NCAA Tournament ==
First Round; March 9
W2 | Saint John's | 1
W3 | St. Thomas | 4

Quarterfinals; March 12
W1 | St. Norbert | 2
W3 | St. Thomas | 3
E3 | Geneseo State | 0
E4 | Trinity | 4
E2 | Middlebury | 6
E5 | Curry | 0
E1 | Manhattanville | 2
E6 | New England College | 4

Semifinals; March 18
W3 | St. Thomas | 4
E4 | Trinity | 1
E2 | Middlebury | 5
E6 | New England College | 2

National Championship; March 19
W3 | St. Thomas | 0
E2 | Middlebury | 5

Note: * denotes overtime period(s)

== See also ==
- 2004–05 NCAA Division I men's ice hockey season
