= MIAC men's ice hockey tournament =

Minnesota Intercollegiate Athletic Conference men's ice hockey tournament
- Conference hockey championship
- Sport: Ice hockey
- Conference: MIAC
- Format: Two-game aggregate, Modified Best of Three, Single-elimination
- Played: 1986–Present

== History ==
Though the MIAC has been playing ice hockey since the 1920s, the league did not play a conference tournament until 1986. The championship served as a capstone for the MIAC season and was used as a final argument for a bid to the Division III NCAA Tournament. Despite not possessing an automatic bid the MIAC tournament champion was selected for the National Tournament each year. For the first four seasons the tournament had all rounds played as two-game total-goal series but changed to single-elimination for all round beginning with the 1990 tournament. Five years later the format was again changed, this time to a two-game point system where the first team to three points would win; one point was awarded for a tie and two points for a win. If the two teams were tied after two games than a 20-minute mini-game was played to determine the winner. By NCAA regulations mini-games were not counted in the standings and were only used to determine which team advanced. In 2000 the MIAC was among the conferences to receive the first automatic bids into the D-III championship, formalizing a practice that had already been in place. The 2021 tournament was cancelled due to the COVID-19 pandemic.

== 1986 ==
Seed	School	Conference record
1	St. Thomas	15–1–0
2	Bethel	11–5–0
3	Saint John's	8–7–1
4	Gustavus Adolphus	8–8–0

Semifinals; February 28–March 1
1	St. Thomas	5	6*	11
4	Gustavus Adolphus	3	6	9
2	Bethel	6	6	12
3	Saint John's	4	3	7

Championship; March 7–8
1	St. Thomas	6	13	19
2	Bethel	4	2	6

Note: * denotes overtime period(s)

== 1987 ==
Seed	School	Conference record
1	Concordia (MN)	12–4–0
2	Saint Mary's	11–5–0
3	St. Thomas	10–6–0
4	Saint John's	9–7–0

Semifinals; February 27–28
1	Concordia (MN)	3	9	12
4	Saint John's	3	3	6
2	Saint Mary's	2	8	10
3	St. Thomas	4	7	11

Championship; March 6–7
1	Concordia (MN)	3	4	7
2	St. Thomas	4	2	6

Note: * denotes overtime period(s)

== 1988 ==
Seed	School	Conference record
1	Saint Mary's	13–2–1
2	St. Thomas	13–3–0
3	Gustavus Adolphus	11–5–0
4	St. Olaf	7–8–1

Semifinals; February 26–27
1	Saint Mary's	9	7	16
4	St. Olaf	1	4	5
2	St. Thomas	5	7	12
3	Gustavus Adolphus	3	4	7

Championship; March 5–6
1	Saint Mary's	6	1	7
2	St. Thomas	3	8	11

Note: * denotes overtime period(s)

== 1989 ==
Seed	School	Conference record
1	St. Thomas	13–3–0
2	Saint Mary's	11–5–0
3	Gustavus Adolphus	10–6–0
4	Augsburg	8–7–1

Semifinals; February 24–25
1	St. Thomas	3	6	9
4	Augsburg	0	2	2
2	Saint Mary's	4	6	10
3	Gustavus Adolphus	1	2	3

Championship; March 3–4
1	St. Thomas	2	3	5
2	Saint Mary's	2*	8	10

Note: * denotes overtime period(s)

== 1990 ==
Seed	School	Conference record
1	St. Thomas	14–2–0
2	Gustavus Adolphus	11–3–2
3	Concordia (MN)	10–4–2
4	Saint Mary's	8–8–0

Semifinals; February 28
1	St. Thomas	5*
4	Saint Mary's	4
2	Gustavus Adolphus	8
3	Concordia (MN)	6

Championship; March 3
1	St. Thomas	1
2	Gustavus Adolphus	3

Note: * denotes overtime period(s)

== 1991 ==
Seed	School	Conference record
1	St. Thomas	13–1–2
2	Gustavus Adolphus	11–3–2
3	Saint Mary's	9–6–1
4	St. Olaf	9–6–1

Semifinals; February 27–28
1	St. Thomas	2
4	St. Olaf	1
2	Gustavus Adolphus	4*
3	Saint Mary's	3

Championship; March 2
1	St. Thomas	2
2	Gustavus Adolphus	7

Note: * denotes overtime period(s)

== 1992 ==
Seed	School	Conference record
1	St. Thomas	12–3–1
2	Saint Mary's	10–2–4
3	Gustavus Adolphus	10–3–3
4	St. Olaf	8–6–2

Semifinals; February 27
1	St. Thomas	6
4	St. Olaf	3
2	Saint Mary's	2
3	Gustavus Adolphus	4

Championship; March 1
1	St. Thomas	6
2	Gustavus Adolphus	4

Note: * denotes overtime period(s)

== 1993 ==
Seed	School	Conference record
1	St. Thomas	13–2–1
2	Gustavus Adolphus	13–2–1
3	Saint Mary's	12–4–0
4	Augsburg	8–8–0

Semifinals; March 3
1	St. Thomas	10
4	Augsburg	2
2	Gustavus Adolphus	5
3	Saint Mary's	3

Championship; March 6
1	St. Thomas	2
2	Gustavus Adolphus	4

Note: * denotes overtime period(s)

== 1994 ==
Seed	School	Conference record
1	St. Thomas	11–2–3
2	Saint John's	11–4–1
3	Saint Mary's	11–4–1
4	Augsburg	9–6–1

Semifinals; March 2
1	St. Thomas	5
4	Augsburg	2
2	Saint John's	3*
3	Saint Mary's	2

Championship; March 5
1	St. Thomas	8
2	Saint John's	3

Note: * denotes overtime period(s)

== 1995 ==
Seed	School	Conference record
1	St. Thomas	12–3–1
2	Saint Mary's	11–4–1
3	Gustavus Adolphus	11–4–1
4	Augsburg	10–4–2

Semifinals; February 24–25
1	St. Thomas	4	3	-
3	Gustavus Adolphus	3	2	-
2	Saint Mary's	4	8	-
4	Augsburg	2	5	-

Championship; March 3–4
1	St. Thomas	4	6	-
2	Saint Mary's	5	8	-

Note: * denotes overtime period(s)
Note: Mini-games in italics

== 1996 ==
Seed	School	Conference record
1	Saint John's	11–1–4
2	Gustavus Adolphus	12–3–1
3	St. Thomas	11–3–2
4	Saint Mary's	10–3–3

Semifinals; February 23–24
1	Saint John's	6	4	-
4	Saint Mary's	2	2	-
2	Gustavus Adolphus	2	2	-
3	St. Thomas	4	4	-

Championship; March 1–2
1	Saint John's	2	8	2
3	St. Thomas	6	0	0

Note: * denotes overtime period(s)
Note: Mini-games in italics

== 1997 ==
Seed	School	Conference record
1	Saint John's	14–2–0
2	St. Thomas	13–3–0
3	Gustavus Adolphus	11–5–0
4	Saint Mary's	10–5–1

Semifinals; March 1–2
1	Saint John's	7	4	-
4	Saint Mary's	5	2	-
2	St. Thomas	5	1	-
3	Gustavus Adolphus	8	3	-

Championship; March 8–9
1	Saint John's	4	5	-
3	Gustavus Adolphus	2	4	-

Note: * denotes overtime period(s)
Note: Mini-games in italics

== 1998 ==
Seed	School	Conference record
1	St. Thomas	12–3–1
2	Augsburg	12–3–1
3	Saint John's	12–4–0
4	Gustavus Adolphus	11–4–1

Semifinals; February 27–28
1	St. Thomas	8	6*	-
4	Gustavus Adolphus	5	6	-
2	Augsburg	4	4	-
3	Saint John's	3	2	-

Championship; March 6–7
1	St. Thomas	4	2	-
2	Augsburg	5	4	-

Note: * denotes overtime period(s)
Note: Mini-games in italics

== 1999 ==
Seed	School	Conference record
1	St. Thomas	11–4–1
2	Saint John's	10–4–2
3	Concordia (MN)	9–5–2
4	Augsburg	8–5–3

Semifinals; February 27–28
1	St. Thomas	4	4	-
4	Augsburg	3	1	-
2	Saint John's	10	3	1
3	Concordia (MN)	2	4	3

Championship; March 5–6
1	St. Thomas	1*	5	-
3	Concordia (MN)	1	2	-

Note: * denotes overtime period(s)
Note: Mini-games in italics

== 2000 ==
Seed	School	Conference record
1	St. Thomas	14–1–1
2	Concordia (MN)	13–2–1
3	Augsburg	18–5–3
4	Saint John's	7–6–3

Semifinals; February 27–28
1	St. Thomas	4	3	-
4	Saint John's	2	2	-
2	Concordia (MN)	7	3	-
3	Augsburg	2	2	-

Championship; March 4–5
1	St. Thomas	4	2	0
2	Concordia (MN)	2	5	1

Note: * denotes overtime period(s)
Note: Mini-games in italics

== 2001 ==
Seed	School	Conference record
1	St. Thomas	11–3–2
2	Concordia (MN)	11–4–1
3	Saint John's	10–4–2
4	Bethel	9–6–1

Semifinals; February 27–28
1	St. Thomas	8	3	0
4	Bethel	3	5	1
2	Concordia (MN)	2	2	-
3	Saint John's	4	4	-

Championship; March 4–5
4	Bethel	3	4	0
3	Saint John's	3	4	1*

Note: * denotes overtime period(s)
Note: Mini-games in italics

== 2002 ==
Seed	School	Conference record
1	St. Thomas	13–3–0
2	Gustavus Adolphus	9–3–4
3	Augsburg	10–5–1
4	Saint John's	9–5–2
5	Concordia (MN)	9–6–1

Play-In; February 28
4	Saint John's	2
5	Concordia (MN)	3

Semifinals; March 1
1	St. Thomas	5
4	Concordia (MN)	1
2	Gustavus Adolphus	4
3	Augsburg	1

Championship; March 2
1	St. Thomas	3
2	Gustavus Adolphus	2

Note: * denotes overtime period(s)

== 2003 ==
Seed	School	Conference record
1	Saint John's	13–2–1
2	St. Thomas	10–5–1
3	Augsburg	10–6–0
4	Gustavus Adolphus	8–7–1
5	Concordia (MN)	7–7–2

Play-In; February 27
4	Gustavus Adolphus	3
5	Concordia (MN)	1

Semifinals; February 28
1	Saint John's	4
4	Gustavus Adolphus	2
2	St. Thomas	7*
3	Augsburg	6

Championship; March 1
1	Saint John's	4*
2	St. Thomas	3

Note: * denotes overtime period(s)

== 2004 ==
Seed	School	Conference record
1	Saint John's	15–1–0
2	St. Thomas	13–2–1
3	Gustavus Adolphus	9–5–2
4	Saint Mary's	8–7–1
5	St. Olaf	7–6–3

Play-In; March 2
4	Saint Mary's	3
5	St. Olaf	5

Semifinals; March 4
1	Saint John's	5
5	St. Olaf	0
2	St. Thomas	6
3	Gustavus Adolphus	3

Championship; March 7
1	Saint John's	3
2	St. Thomas	4*

Note: * denotes overtime period(s)

== 2005 ==
Seed	School	Conference record
1	Saint John's	14–1–1
2	St. Thomas	12–3–1
3	Bethel	10–6–0
4	St. Olaf	8–4–4
5	Gustavus Adolphus	7–8–1

Play-In; March 1
4	St. Olaf	3
5	Gustavus Adolphus	2

Semifinals; March 3
1	Saint John's	2*
4	St. Olaf	1
2	St. Thomas	4*
3	Bethel	3

Championship; March 5
1	Saint John's	1
2	St. Thomas	2

Note: * denotes overtime period(s)

== 2006 ==
Seed	School	Conference record
1	St. Thomas	13–2–1
2	Saint John's	11–3–2
3	St. Olaf	8–5–3
4	Bethel	8–6–2
5	Gustavus Adolphus	9–7–0

Play-In; February 28
4	Bethel	7
5	Gustavus Adolphus	5

Semifinals; March 2
1	St. Thomas	5*
4	Bethel	4
2	Saint John's	2
3	St. Olaf	3

Championship; March 4
1	St. Thomas	1
3	St. Olaf	5

Note: * denotes overtime period(s)

== 2007 ==
Seed	School	Conference record
1	Bethel	12–3–1
2	St. Thomas	12–4–0
3	Augsburg	9–3–4
4	St. Olaf	9–5–2
5	Gustavus Adolphus	9–6–1

First Round; February 27
4	St. Olaf	3
5	Gustavus Adolphus	1

Semifinals; March 1
1	Bethel	5
4	St. Olaf	4
2	St. Thomas	3
3	Augsburg	1

Championship; March 3
1	Bethel	5
2	St. Thomas	3

Note: * denotes overtime period(s)

== 2008 ==
Seed	School	Conference record
1	Hamline	11–3–2
2	St. Thomas	11–4–1
3	Bethel	11–4–1
4	Gustavus Adolphus	10–6–0
5	Saint John's	8–6–2

First Round; February 28
4	Gustavus Adolphus	2
5	Saint John's	5

Semifinals; March 1
1	Hamline	4
5	Saint John's	2
2	St. Thomas	3
3	Bethel	1

Championship; March 5
1	Hamline	1
2	St. Thomas	4

Note: * denotes overtime period(s)

== 2009 ==
Seed	School	Conference record
1	St. Olaf	12–1–3
2	Gustavus Adolphus	10–6–0
3	St. Thomas	9–5–2
4	Hamline	9–7–0
5	Augsburg	8–7–1

First Round; February 26
4	Hamline	5
5	Augsburg	4

Semifinals; February 28
1	St. Olaf	1
4	Hamline	5
2	Gustavus Adolphus	3
3	St. Thomas	1

Championship; March 4
4	Hamline	2
2	Gustavus Adolphus	5

Note: * denotes overtime period(s)

== 2010 ==
Seed	School	Conference record
1	Gustavus Adolphus	12–2–2
2	Hamline	11–3–2
3	St. Thomas	8–6–2
4	Augsburg	8–7–1
5	St. Olaf	6–6–4

First Round; February 26
4	Augsburg	5**
5	St. Olaf	4

Semifinals; February 27
1	Gustavus Adolphus	6****
4	Augsburg	5
2	Hamline	4
3	St. Thomas	5*

Championship; March 3
1	Gustavus Adolphus	1
3	St. Thomas	2*

Note: * denotes overtime period(s)

== 2011 ==
Seed	School	Conference record
1	Hamline	9–3–4
2	St. Thomas	9–5–2
3	Concordia (MN)	7–5–4
4	Gustavus Adolphus	8–6–2
5	Augsburg	8–6–2

First Round; February 25
4	Gustavus Adolphus	4**
5	Augsburg	3

Semifinals; February 26
1	Hamline	3
4	Gustavus Adolphus	0
2	St. Thomas	2
3	Concordia (MN)	4

Championship; March 5
1	Hamline	5
3	Concordia (MN)	2

Note: * denotes overtime period(s)

== 2012 ==
Seed	School	Conference record
1	St. Thomas	13–2–1
2	Gustavus Adolphus	8–5–3
3	Saint John's	9–7–0
4	St. Olaf	7–6–3
5	Hamline	7–8–1

First Round; February 25
4	St. Olaf	3
5	Hamline	2

Semifinals; February 26
1	St. Thomas	3
4	St. Olaf	4
2	Gustavus Adolphus	3
3	Saint John's	1

Championship; March 5
4	St. Olaf	2
2	Gustavus Adolphus	4

Note: * denotes overtime period(s)

== 2013 ==
Seed	School	Conference record
1	St. Thomas	10–5–1
2	Saint John's	9–4–3
3	Concordia (MN)	10–6–0
4	Gustavus Adolphus	9–5–2
5	St. Olaf	9–7–0

First Round; February 21
4	Gustavus Adolphus	3
5	St. Olaf	2

Semifinals; February 23
1	St. Thomas	0
4	Gustavus Adolphus	1
2	Saint John's	5
3	Concordia (MN)	1

Championship; March 2
4	Gustavus Adolphus	2
2	Saint John's	3

Note: * denotes overtime period(s)

== 2014 ==
Seed	School	Conference record
1	St. Thomas	13–1–2
2	Gustavus Adolphus	12–3–1
3	Saint John's	10–6–0
4	St. Olaf	9–4–3
5	Concordia (MN)	6–6–4

First Round; February 28
4	St. Olaf	5
5	Concordia (MN)	2

Semifinals; March 1
1	St. Thomas	2
4	St. Olaf	1
2	Gustavus Adolphus	3
3	Saint John's	2

Championship; March 8
1	St. Thomas	2
2	Gustavus Adolphus	1

Note: * denotes overtime period(s)

== 2015 ==
Seed	School	Conference record
1	St. Thomas	10–3–3–1
2	Saint Mary's	9–5–2–2
3	Concordia (MN)	8–5–3–1
4	Augsburg	9–7–0–0
5	Hamline	7–6–3–1

First Round; February 26
4	Augsburg	3
5	Hamline	4

Semifinals; February 28–March 1
1	St. Thomas	3
5	Hamline	6
2	Saint Mary's	4**
3	Concordia (MN)	3

Championship; March 7
5	Hamline	4
2	Saint Mary's	2

Note: * denotes overtime period(s)
The semifinal between Saint Mary's and Concordia was rescheduled from February 28 to March 1

== 2016 ==
Seed	School	Conference record
1	Augsburg	11–3–2–1
2	St. Thomas	10–3–3–1
3	Saint John's	10–4–2–1
4	Concordia (MN)	8–7–1–1
5	Hamline	8–6–2–2

First Round; February 26
4	Concordia (MN)	0
5	Hamline	3

Semifinals; February 28–March 1
1	Augsburg	5
5	Hamline	2
2	St. Thomas	1
3	Saint John's	2*

Championship; March 7
1	Augsburg	5***
3	Saint John's	4

Note: * denotes overtime period(s)

=== First Round ===
==== (4) Concordia (MN) vs. (5) Hamline ====
February 26	Concordia (MN)	0 – 3	Hamline	Moorhead Sports Center	Recap
No scoring		First period	Mitch McPherson (11) – pp – 12:50
No scoring		Second period	Mitch McPherson (12) – 17:07
No scoring		Third period	Brandon Zurn (19) – en – 18:36
Alex Reichle (24 saves / 26 shots)		Goalie stats	Justin Quale (30 saves / 30 shots)

=== Semifinals ===
==== (1) Augsburg vs. (5) Hamline ====
February 27	Augsburg	5 – 2	Hamline	Augsburg Ice Arena	Recap
03:26 – Corbin Chapman (10); 15:46 – Will Peterson (4)		First period	No scoring
No scoring		Second period	Garrett Schmitz (5) – 18:58; Mitch McPherson (13) – pp – 19:54
13:17 – Drew Allen (6); 16:11 – Corbin Chapman (11); 19:08 – en – Nate Flynn (16)		Third period	No scoring
Jordyn Kaufer (24 saves / 26 shots)		Goalie stats	Justin Quale (33 saves / 37 shots)

==== (2) St. Thomas vs. (3) Saint John's ====
February 27	St. Thomas	1 – 2	OT	Saint John's	St. Thomas Ice Arena	Recap
06:37 – John Roisum (3)		First period		No scoring
No scoring		Second period		No scoring
No scoring		Third period		Joe Freemark (1) – 18:20
No scoring		First overtime period		Andrew Commers (8) – 01:26
Joe Morris (24 saves / 26 shots)		Goalie stats		Saxton Soley (23 saves / 24 shots)

=== Finals ===
==== (2) St. Thomas vs. (3) Saint John's ====
February 27	Augsburg	5 – 4	3OT	Saint John's	Augsburg Ice Arena	Recap
No scoring		First period		Andrew Commers (9) – 03:34; Andrew Commers (10) – pp – 07:44
06:37 – Max Pernhem (4); 15:49 – pp – Luke Dietsch (3)		Second period		Sam Valerius (7) – 18:10
06:14 – Eric Brenk (9); 13:03 – Rory Vesel (2)		Third period		Andrew Commers (11) – 03:53
02:53 – Mack Ohnsted (6)		Third overtime period		No scoring
Jordyn Kaufer (48 saves / 52 shots)		Goalie stats		Saxton Soley (57 saves / 62 shots)

== 2017 ==
Seed	School	Conference record
1	St. Thomas	11–3–2–1
2	Augsburg	9–2–5–1
3	Saint Mary's	9–6–1–0
4	Hamline	7–5–4–1
5	Concordia (MN)	7–7–2–0

First Round; February 23
4	Hamline	2
5	Concordia (MN)	3

Semifinals; February 25
1	St. Thomas	2
5	Concordia (MN)	1
2	Augsburg	5*
3	St. Mary's	4

Championship; March 4
1	St. Thomas	2
2	Augsburg	3

Note: * denotes overtime period(s)

== 2018 ==
Seed	School	Conference record
1	St. Thomas	11–4–1–0
2	Saint John's	11–5–0–0
3	Augsburg	10–6–0–0
4	Gustavus Adolphus	9–7–0–0
5	Concordia (MN)	7–8–1–1

First Round; February 22
4	Gustavus Adolphus	2
5	Concordia (MN)	1

Semifinals; February 24
1	St. Thomas	3
4	Gustavus Adolphus	4*
2	Saint John's	3
3	Augsburg	4

Championship; March 3
4	Gustavus Adolphus	1
3	Augsburg	3

Note: * denotes overtime period(s)

== 2019 ==
Seed	School	Conference record
1	Augsburg	13–1–2–0
2	Saint John's	9–4–3–2
3	St. Thomas	8–3–5–2
4	Concordia (MN)	9–5–2–2
5	Saint Mary's	7–7–2–1

First Round; February 21
4	Concordia (MN)	2
5	Saint Mary's	5

Semifinals; February 23
1	Augsburg	8
5	Saint Mary's	1
2	Saint John's	4
3	St. Thomas	1

Championship; March 2
1	Augsburg	2****
2	Saint John's	1

Note: * denotes overtime period(s)

== 2020 ==
Seed	School	Conference record
1	Saint John's	9–3–4–2
2	Concordia (MN)	10–5–1–1
3	Augsburg	9–6–1–1
4	St. Thomas	9–6–1–0
5	Gustavus Adolphus	7–7–2–1

First Round; February 27
4	St. Thomas	3
5	Gustavus Adolphus	2

Semifinals; February 29
1	Saint John's	1
4	St. Thomas	4
2	Concordia (MN)	3
3	Augsburg	2

Championship; March 7
4	St. Thomas	3
2	Concordia (MN)	2

Note: * denotes overtime period(s)

== 2022 ==
Seed	School	Conference record	Seed	School	Conference record
1	Augsburg	14–2–0–0	6	Saint Mary's	5–7–0–0
2	Concordia (MN)	10–4–2–1	7	St. Olaf	5–8–1–1
3	Saint John's	9–4–1–0	8	Hamline	1–10–3–1
4	St. Scholastica	7–6–1–1	9	Gustavus Adolphus	0–9–3–1
5	Bethel	7–8–1–1			

First Round; February 23
8	Hamline	3
9	Gustavus Adolphus	4

Quarterfinals; February 26–27
1	Augsburg	4*
9	Gustavus Adolphus	3
4	St. Scholastica	3
5	Bethel	4*
2	Concordia (MN)	2
7	St. Olaf	3
3	Saint John's	5
6	St. Mary's	1

Semifinals; March 2
1	Augsburg	7
5	Bethel	0
7	St. Olaf	3
3	Saint John's	1

Championship; March 5
1	Augsburg	2
7	St. Olaf	5

Note: * denotes overtime period(s)

=== First Round ===
==== (2) Hamline vs. (3) Gustavus Adolphus ====
February 23	Hamline	3 – 4	Gustavus Adolphus	TRIA Rink
16:18 – sh – Jackson Wille (6)		First period	No scoring
03:06 – pp – Joe Collins (6); 17:42 – pp – Jackson Wille (7)		Second period	Kyle Heffron (2) – 04:30; Jack Suchy (4) – 04:59
No scoring		Third period	Patrick Gazich (8) – pp – 13:07; Brandon McNamara (5) – 16:23
Kevin Lake (18 saves / 22 shots)		Goalie stats	Grant Boldt (19 saves / 22 shots)

=== Quarterfinals ===
==== (1) Augsburg vs. (9) Gustavus Adolphus ====
February 26	Augsburg	4 – 3	OT	Gustavus Adolphus	Augsburg Ice Arena
17:31 – pp – Austin Dollimer (6)		First period		No scoring
08:59 – pp – Grant Reichenbacher (8)		Second period		Connor Clemons (5) – 06:37; Toby Sengvongxay (3) – 12:14
14:06 – pp – Austin Dollimer (7)		Third period		Patrick Gazich (9) – 07:33
07:35 – pp – Austin Martinsen (14)		First overtime period		No scoring
Jack Robbel (23 saves / 26 shots)		Goalie stats		Grant Boldt (38 saves / 42 shots)

==== (4) St. Scholastica vs. (5) Bethel ====
February 26	St. Scholastica	3 – 4	OT	Bethel	Mars Lakeview Arena
05:01 – Tyler Hinterser (7)		First period		Adam Bricker (6) – 07:22; Adam Bricker (7) – 08:29
08:25 – pp – Filimon Ledenkov (8)		Second period		No scoring
17:00 – Filimon Ledenkov (9)		Third period		Jarrett Cammarata (6) – 16:29
No scoring		First overtime period		Braeden Bartoo (5) – 16:01
Jack Bostedt (33 saves / 37 shots)		Goalie stats		Travis Allen (41 saves / 44 shots)

==== (2) Concordia (MN) vs. (7) St. Olaf ====
February 26	Concordia (MN)	2 – 3	St. Olaf	Moorhead Sports Center
19:32 – Kevin Ness (8)		First period	Jonathan Young (4) – 09:37
04:28 – Keaton Leininger (2)		Second period	Noah Heisler (2) – 18:24
No scoring		Third period	Sean Walsh (11) – 18:59
Jackson Nelson (19 saves / 22 shots)		Goalie stats	Lukas Haugen (29 saves / 31 shots)

==== (3) Saint John's vs. (6) St. Mary's ====
February 27	Saint John's	5 – 1	St. Mary's	Herb Brooks National Hockey Center
05:56 – pp – Josh Maucieri (5); 07:40 – Lewis Crosby (17)		First period	No scoring
11:47 – Matt DeRosa (4)		Second period	No scoring
09:59 – Auggie Moore (14); 16:40 – en – Auggie Moore (15)		Third period	Nathan Solis (3) – 05:25
Mac Berglove (26 saves / 27 shots)		Goalie stats	Matthew Sankner (25 saves / 29 shots)

=== Semifinals ===
==== (1) Augsburg vs. (5) Bethel ====
March 2	Augsburg	7 – 0	Bethel	Augsburg Ice Arena
03:45 – Fritz Belisle (13); 14:07 – pp – Fritz Belisle (14)		First period	No scoring
02:32 – pp – Fritz Belisle (15); 14:53 – Andrew Hicks (1); 18:37 – sh – Kyler Yeo (4)		Second period	No scoring
12:07 – pp – Austin Martinsen (15); 13:13 – pp – Fritz Belisle (16)		Third period	No scoring
Samuel Vyletelka (7 saves / 7 shots)		Goalie stats	Travis Allen (35 saves / 42 shots)

==== (3) Saint John's vs. (7) St. Olaf ====
March 2	Saint John's	1 – 3	St. Olaf	Herb Brooks National Hockey Center
No scoring		First period	Jonathan Young (5) – 12:41
No scoring		Second period	No scoring
05:32 – pp – Jack Johnson (2)		Third period	Tyler Cooper (13) – pp – 07:20; Noah Heisler (3) – en – 19:04
Mac Berglove (17 saves / 19 shots)		Goalie stats	Lukas Haugen (33 saves / 34 shots)

=== Finals ===
==== (1) Augsburg vs. (5) Bethel ====
March 2	Augsburg	2 – 5	St. Olaf	Augsburg Ice Arena
No scoring		First period	Parker Casey (5) – 19:35
No scoring		Second period	Jonathan Young (6) – 07:20; Sean Walsh (12) – 17:48
10:31 – pp – Jarod Blackowiak (12); 19:13 – Austin Dollimer (8)		Third period	Jonathan Young (7) – pp – 04:05; Brendan Darby (6) – en – 16:26
Jack Robbel (24 saves / 28 shots)		Goalie stats	Lukas Haugen (25 saves / 27 shots)

== 2023 ==
Seed	School	Conference record
1	St. Scholastica	13–1–2–2–0–1
2	Augsburg	10–5–1–1–1–0
3	Saint John's	9–5–2–1–0–1
4	Concordia (MN)	9–6–1–2–0–0
5	St. Olaf	7–8–1–0–1–1

First Round; February 24
4	Concordia (MN)	3
5	St. Olaf	4

Semifinals; February 25–26
1	St. Scholastica	3
5	St. Olaf	2
2	Augsburg	3
3	Saint John's	1

Championship; March 4
1	St. Scholastica	1
2	Augsburg	4

Note: * denotes overtime period(s)

== 2024 ==
Seed	School	Conference record
1	Augsburg	12–3–1–0–0–0
2	Bethel	11–3–2–3–1–2
3	St. Scholastica	8–7–1–1–1–1
4	Saint Mary's	8–7–1–1–0–1
5	St. Olaf	7–7–2–1–0–1

First Round; February 21
4	Saint Mary's	0
5	St. Olaf	3

Semifinals; February 24
1	Augsburg	0
5	St. Olaf	4
2	Bethel	2
3	St. Scholastica	1

Championship; March 2
5	St. Olaf	4
2	Bethel	1

Note: * denotes overtime period(s)

== 2025 ==
Seed	School	Conference record
1	Gustavus Adolphus	10–4–2–2–1–2
2	Bethel	9–5–2–3–1–2
3	St. Olaf	8–7–1–0–0–1
4	Saint John's	8–7–1–0–1–0
5	Concordia (MN)	7–6–3–1–0–0

First Round; February 26
4	Saint John's	3
5	Concordia	4

Semifinals; March 1
1	Gustavus Adolphus	6
5	Concordia	2
2	Bethel	1
3	St. Olaf	3

Championship; March 8
1	Gustavus Adolphus	2
3	St. Olaf	1

Note: * denotes overtime period(s)

== 2026 ==
Seed	School	Conference record
1	Saint John's	10–3–3–1–1–2
2	Saint Mary's	10–5–1–0–1–1
3	Gustavus Adolphus	12–4–0–4–1–0
4	Bethel	9–7–0–0–3–0
5	St. Olaf	8–6–2–1–1–0

First Round; February 25
4	Bethel	5
5	St. Olaf	2

Semifinals; February 28
1	Saint John's	4
4	Bethel	1
2	Saint Mary's	1
3	Gustavus Adolphus	6

Championship; March 7
1	Saint John's	4*
3	Gustavus Adolphus	3

Note: * denotes overtime period(s)

== Championships ==
School	Championships
St. Thomas	12
Augsburg	6
Gustavus Adolphus	6
Saint John's	6
St. Olaf	3
Concordia (MN)	2
Hamline	2
Saint Mary's	2
Bethel	1
