= 2013–14 NCAA Division II men's ice hockey season =

- Duration: November 1, 2013– March 1, 2014
- NCAA tournament: 2014

The 2013–14 NCAA Division II men's ice hockey season began on November 1, 2013 and concluded on March 1, 2014. This was the 32nd season of second-tier college ice hockey.

== Regular season ==
=== Standings ===
2013–14 Northeast-10 Conference ice hockey standings
	Conference							Overall					
	GP	W	L	T	PTS	GF	GA	GP	W	L	T	GF	GA
Stonehill †	11	11	0	0	10	52	22	26	16	10	0	92	71
Saint Anselm	5	4	1	0	8	20	8	26	10	12	4	78	72
Southern New Hampshire *	11	7	4	0	6	41	33	26	17	8	1	98	80
Saint Michael's	5	2	3	0	4	18	21	27	7	17	3	74	105
Franklin Pierce	11	2	8	1	2	26	46	24	4	17	3	55	99
Assumption	11	0	10	1	0	20	47	25	4	19	2	58	92
Championship: March 1, 2014 † indicates conference regular season champion * indicates conference tournament champions Saint Anselm and Saint Michael's remained members of the ECAC East and only played a partial Northeast-10 schedule. As a result only one game between each of the conference members was counted in the standings.

== See also ==
- 2013–14 NCAA Division I men's ice hockey season
- 2013–14 NCAA Division III men's ice hockey season
