= 1999–2000 NCAA Division III men's ice hockey season =

27th season of Division III college ice hockey

1999–00 NCAA Division III men's ice hockey season
- Duration: October 22, 1999– March 18, 2000
- NCAA tournament: 2000
- National championship: Wessman Arena; Superior, Wisconsin
- NCAA champion: Norwich
- Sid Watson Award: Steve Aronson (St. Thomas)

The 1999–2000 NCAA Division III men's ice hockey season began on October 22, 1999 and concluded on March 18, 2000. This was the 27th season of Division III college ice hockey.

== Conference and rule changes ==
The NCAA began offering automatic bids for conference tournament champions for the first time. Partly due to this development, ECAC East split into two conferences when the NESCAC began sponsoring ice hockey as a sport and its nine existing programs left ECAC East to form the new league. Each team in the ECAC East and NESCAC played one another in one game that counted in their respective conference standings.

With the NESCAC now sponsoring ice hockey as a varsity sport, the conference dropped its policy that allowed member schools to play in only one postseason tournament. Member teams could now play in both the conference tournament and the national tournament.

=== Division II ===
With only a handful teams remaining at the Division II level, the NCAA discontinued the Division II Tournament in 1999. Because there was no longer a national tournament, schools that operated varsity ice hockey programs had several options available to them. A D-II program could play in Division I with no penalty, which is what several universities decided to attempt. However, if a school elected against promoting a program, it could continue on as a Division II program and be allowed to be a member of a Division III conference. Any program that played below its school's nominal level would be ineligible for the national tournament. Additionally, any games it played would not be taken into consideration by the selection committee.

Despite their unofficial status, five eastern teams chose to continued as Division II programs. After the regular season, they held a separate ECAC Division II Tournament rather than compete in their respective conference tournaments.

Minnesota–Crookston joined the MCHA, as a Division II program. While they met conference and NCAA guidelines by not offering scholarships to any players, the program was still ineligible for postseason play.

== Regular season ==
=== Standings ===
1999–00 ECAC East standings
	Conference							Overall					
	GP	W	L	T	PTS	GF	GA	GP	W	L	T	GF	GA
Norwich †*	17	16	0	1	33	108	31	32	29	2	1	188	64
Salem State	17	8	7	2	18	69	68	27	15	9	3	117	90
Massachusetts–Boston	17	7	10	0	14	61	62	25	13	12	0	97	87
Southern Maine	17	6	10	1	13	43	76	26	11	13	2	77	110
New England College	17	5	9	3	13	77	71	26	11	12	3	135	106
Saint Anselm ~	17	5	11	1	11	46	70	26	12	13	1	102	93
MCLA	17	3	14	0	6	35	109	25	7	17	1	60	136
Skidmore	17	2	14	1	5	39	80	23	3	18	2	56	107
Babson	17	1	15	1	3	39	77	25	7	17	1	74	100
Championship: March 4, 2000 † indicates conference regular season champion * indicates conference tournament champion ~ indicates Division II Tournament champion

1999–00 ECAC Northeast standings
	Conference							Overall					
	GP	W	L	T	PTS	GF	GA	GP	W	L	T	GF	GA
Division III
Wentworth †*	13	11	1	1	23	88	30	30	17	12	1	148	111
Fitchburg State	13	10	1	2	22	63	29	28	18	6	4	126	80
Tufts	13	9	3	1	19	56	34	24	13	10	1	99	89
Massachusetts–Dartmouth	13	8	3	2	18	81	43	26	15	9	2	132	93
Lebanon Valley	13	8	4	1	17	49	34	24	17	6	1	138	60
Johnson & Wales	13	7	6	0	14	59	49	26	14	12	0	119	103
Western New England	13	7	6	0	14	62	53	25	11	12	2	120	112
Salve Regina	13	6	6	1	13	50	54	23	9	13	1	90	138
Plymouth State	13	5	6	2	12	40	63	20	6	12	2	61	69
Worcester State	13	4	8	1	9	40	63	24	11	12	1	84	101
Framingham State	13	3	8	2	8	37	51	25	6	16	3	71	111
Suffolk	13	3	9	1	7	49	81	20	4	15	1	65	130
Curry	13	3	10	0	6	38	82	23	4	18	1	58	156
Nichols	13	0	13	0	0	22	103	21	0	21	0	44	173
Division II
Saint Michael's	17	12	5	0	24	108	53	26	12	14	0	129	117
New Hampshire College	17	11	5	1	23	100	61	25	15	9	1	143	93
Assumption	17	5	11	1	11	71	91	27	8	18	1	105	162
Stonehill	16‡	5	10	1	11	57	73	21	6	14	1	73	101
Division III Championship: March 4, 2000; Division II Championship: March 4, 2000 † indicates conference regular season champion * indicates conference tournament champions ~ indicates Division II Tournament champion ‡ a game between Plymouth State and Stonehill was suspended due to a power outage and never played.

1999–00 ECAC West standings
	Conference							Overall					
	GP	W	L	T	PTS	GF	GA	GP	W	L	T	GF	GA
RIT †*	6	5	1	0	10	43	12	29	21	7	1	148	84
Elmira †	6	5	1	0	10	38	16	27	21	6	0	141	71
Manhattanville	6	1	5	0	2	19	36	26	8	17	1	108	121
Hobart	6	1	5	0	2	13	49	26	6	19	1	79	136
Championship: March 4, 2000 † indicates conference regular season champion * indicates conference tournament champions

1999–00 NCAA Division III Independent ice hockey standings
	Overall record					
	GP	W	L	T	GF	GA
Neumann	21	6	13	2		
Scranton	7	0	7	0		

1999–00 Midwest Collegiate Hockey Association standings
	Conference							Overall					
	GP	W	L	T	Pct.	GF	GA	GP	W	L	T	GF	GA
Minnesota–Crookston †*	10	10	0	0	1.000	62	13	18	15	3	0	88	43
Marian	14	12	2	0	.857	92	32	27	15	12	0	135	93
MSOE	14	8	6	0	.571	55	52	27	13	12	2	97	102
Northland	16	2	13	1	.156	52	89	23	3	19	1	78	133
Lawrence	14	1	12	1	.107	21	96	21	1	19	1	23	129
Championship: February 26, 2000 † indicates conference regular season champion * indicates conference tournament champions

1999–00 Minnesota Intercollegiate Athletic Conference ice hockey standings
	Conference							Overall					
	GP	W	L	T	Pts	GF	GA	GP	W	L	T	GF	GA
St. Thomas †	16	14	1	1	29	101	45	33	27	4	2	182	89
Concordia (MN) *	16	13	12	1	27	74	32	31	20	9	2	123	76
Augsburg	16	8	5	3	19	65	49	27	10	13	4	90	88
Saint John's	16	7	6	3	17	64	61	27	12	12	3	105	99
St. Olaf	16	6	8	2	14	51	58	25	11	12	2	96	94
Bethel	16	6	9	1	13	71	68	25	10	14	1	108	117
Saint Mary's	16	4	11	1	9	49	69	25	9	14	2	88	101
Gustavus Adolphus	16	5	9	2	12	45	73	25	7	16	2	76	113
Hamline	16	1	13	2	4	31	96	25	5	17	3	71	139
Championship: March 5, 2000 † indicates conference regular season champion * indicates conference tournament champion

1999–00 New England Small College Athletic Conference ice hockey standings
	Conference							Overall					
	GP	W	L	T	PTS	GF	GA	GP	W	L	T	GF	GA
Middlebury †*	17	14	2	1	29	82	35	28	20	5	3	118	61
Colby	17	14	3	0	28	66	41	26	16	9	1	94	80
Bowdoin	17	12	3	2	26	82	44	24	17	5	2	116	67
Williams	17	12	3	2	26	74	45	27	17	7	3	107	74
Amherst	17	11	4	2	24	68	43	24	15	6	3	89	58
Hamilton	17	11	5	1	23	86	55	26	15	8	3	116	86
Wesleyan	17	5	9	3	13	41	68	25	9	11	5	83	102
Trinity	17	6	11	0	12	60	67	23	9	14	0	87	85
Connecticut College	17	3	11	3	9	40	74	24	6	14	4	77	105
Championship: March 4, 2000 † indicates conference regular season champion * indicates conference tournament champion

1999–00 Northern Collegiate Hockey Association standings
	Conference							Overall					
	GP	W	L	T	Pts	GF	GA	GP	W	L	T	GF	GA
Wisconsin–Stevens Point †	14	12	2	0	24	60	30	31	23	7	1	144	80
St. Norbert	14	10	3	1	21	66	30	29	22	5	2	147	64
Wisconsin–Superior *	14	10	4	0	20	53	41	35	24	10	1	129	88
Wisconsin–River Falls	14	8	4	2	18	46	40	29	16	9	4	91	81
Lake Forest	14	7	7	0	14	51	54	26	15	11	0	110	94
Wisconsin–Eau Claire	14	5	9	0	10	53	59	27	9	17	1	97	112
Wisconsin–Stout	14	1	12	1	3	27	66	27	5	21	1	62	113
St. Scholastica	14	1	13	0	2	26	62	27	6	21	0	71	115
Championship: March 4, 2000 † indicates conference regular season champion * indicates conference tournament champion

1999–00 State University of New York Athletic Conference ice hockey standings
	Conference							Overall					
	GP	W	L	T	PTS	GF	GA	GP	W	L	T	GF	GA
Plattsburgh State †*	14	13	0	1	27	95	42	33	26	4	3	190	99
Potsdam State	14	10	4	0	20	63	44	29	15	13	1	121	117
Fredonia State	14	8	4	2	18	52	47	27	11	13	3	83	99
Oswego State	14	6	6	2	14	50	45	29	15	11	3	118	99
Brockport State	14	5	8	1	11	61	67	27	7	17	3	99	133
Geneseo State	14	4	9	1	9	59	69	29	8	18	3	104	142
Cortland State	14	3	8	3	9	38	57	24	9	12	3	70	88
Buffalo State	14	1	11	2	4	42	89	24	7	13	4	101	116
Championship: March 6, 2000 † indicates conference regular season champion * indicates conference tournament champions

Note: Mini-game are not included in final standings

== 2000 NCAA tournament ==
Quarterfinals; March 10–11
Norwich	4	5	-
RIT	1	1	-
Wisconsin–Superior	3	4	-
Concordia	2	1	-
St. Thomas	6	10	-
Wentworth	0	3	-
Middlebury	1	4	0
Plattsburgh State	1	4	1

Semifinals; March 17
Norwich	5*
Wisconsin–Superior	4
St. Thomas	7
Plattsburgh State	1

National championship March 18
Norwich	2
St. Thomas	1
Third-place game
Wisconsin–Superior	0
Plattsburgh State	2

Note: * denotes overtime period(s)

== See also ==
- 1999–2000 NCAA Division I men's ice hockey season
