= 2014–15 NCAA Division II men's ice hockey season =

- Duration: October 31, 2014– February 28, 2015
- NCAA tournament: 2015

The 2014–15 NCAA Division II men's ice hockey season began on October 31, 2014 and concluded on February 28, 2015. This was the 33rd season of second-tier college ice hockey.

== Regular season ==
=== Standings ===
2014–15 Northeast-10 Conference ice hockey standings
	Conference								Overall					
	GP	W	L	T	PTS	GF	GA		GP	W	L	T	GF	GA
Saint Michael's †	5	3	0	2	8	20	11		27	9	16	2	74	96
Stonehill †	10	8	0	2	8	51	22	^	24	14	6	4	95	63
Saint Anselm *	5	2	1	2	6	14	12		27	11	13	3	76	92
Assumption	10	4	6	0	4	29	31	^	24	8	16	0	65	82
Southern New Hampshire	11	3	7	1	3	33	47		24	10	12	2	91	96
Franklin Pierce	11	2	8	1	1	28	52		24	3	20	1	48	108
Championship: February 28, 2015 † indicates conference regular season champion * indicates conference tournament champions^ A game between Stonehill and Assumption on February 14 was cancelled. Saint Anselm and Saint Michael's remained members of the ECAC East and only played a partial Northeast-10 schedule. As a result only one game between each of the conference members was counted in the standings.

== See also ==
- 2014–15 NCAA Division I men's ice hockey season
- 2014–15 NCAA Division III men's ice hockey season
