= 2023–24 Stonehill Skyhawks men's ice hockey season =

- Conference: Independent
- Home ice: Bridgewater Ice Arena

Rankings
- USCHO: NR
- USA Hockey: NR

Record
- Overall: 2–34–0
- Home: 2–9–0
- Road: 0–25–0

Coaches and captains
- Head coach: David Borges
- Assistant coaches: Darrell Borges; Sebastian Ragno
- Captain: Max Pineo
- Alternate captains: Frank Ireland; Carter Rapalje

The 2023–24 Stonehill Skyhawks men's ice hockey season was the 45th season of play for the program and 2nd at the Division I level. The Skyhawks represented Stonehill College and were coached by David Borges in his 10th season.

== Season ==
For their second season as a D-I team, Stonehill was able to put together a schedule mostly against their contemporaries. Unfortunately, the team was not yet up to Division I standards. Stonehill's offense was lacking in firepower, averaging only about 20 shots per game which resulted in well under 2 goals per match. Conversely, the team's defense was porous and the goaltending suffered; the Skyhawks allowed more than 40 shots against per contest, resulting in just under 6 goals against per game. That is a recipe for disaster and the team's record bears that out.

From the very start of the season the Skyhawks netminders were under siege and were rarely able to catch their breaths. Dylan Meilun, the primary starter during the year, turned in a few decent performances but for the first 28 games the offense was too weak to take advantage. Even in the few matches against lower-tier clubs, Stonehill was unable to find a way to earn a victory and the team seemed destined for a winless campaign. Late January saw the team show some signs of life when the offense produced its best effort on the year. Though they lost to Lindenwood in overtime, the next series between the two saw Stonehill finally get its first win against a Division I opponent (albeit one of the worst teams that year). Not satisfied with just one victory, the Skyhawks won their next game as well, winning their final two home games. Their winning streak ended as soon as they hit the road and Stonehill lost their final six games to end the year.

Stonehill was able to avoid total ignominy with their two wins but that didn't stop the team from being ranked among the worst teams in college hockey history. While others have had worse records (1961 Brown, 1962 Colorado College) there haven't been many. Stonehill's 34 losses on the year put them one shy of the all-time record, held by 2014 Alabama–Huntsville.

Shortly after the end of the season, head coach David Borges announced his retirement, bringing his 26-year coaching career to a close.

A game with Saint Anselm scheduled for February 13 was cancelled due to inclement weather.

== Departures ==
Player	Position	Nationality	Cause
Will Cohen	Defenseman	United States	Left program (retired)
John Day	Goaltender	United States	Graduation (retired)
Drew Gardner	Defenseman	United States	Transferred to Ohio
Andrew Gotts	Defenseman	United States	Left program (retired)
Richard Hall	Defenseman	United States	Graduation (retired)
Thomas Horak	Forward	United States	Left program (retired)
Teddy McElaney	Defenseman	United States	Graduation (retired)
Brendan Nehmer	Forward	United States	Graduation (signed with EG Diez-Limburg)
John Peloso	Forward	United States	Graduation (retired)
Austin Pick	Forward	United States	Left program (retired)
Matthew Pimental	Forward	United States	Left program (retired)
Pat Sunderland	Forward	United States	Left program (retired)
Matt Talarico	Forward	United States	Left program (retired)

== Recruiting ==
Player	Position	Nationality	Age	Notes
Matt Allen	Forward	United States	24	Smithfield, RI; graduate transfer from Union
Charlie Banquier	Defenseman	Canada	20	Oakville, ON
Justin Barker	Forward	Canada	20	Calgary, AB
Dominick Campione	Defenseman	United States	20	Kohler, WI
Devon Carlstrom	Defenseman	United States	21	Palm Beach Gardens, FL
Anthony Galante	Forward	United States	21	Morganville, NJ
Cam Gaudette	Defenseman	United States	23	Braintree, MA; transfer from Northeastern
Joseph Grainda	Forward	United States	21	Carmel, IN
Hunter Hastings	Forward	United States	21	Scottsdale, AZ
Greg Japchen	Defenseman	United States	21	Doylestown, PA; transfer from Union
Jake LaRusso	Forward	United States	21	Colts Neck, NJ; joined mid-season
Dylan Meilun	Goaltender	Canada	21	Winnipeg, MB; transfer from Wisconsin–Superior
Conor Ronayne	Forward	United States	21	Plymouth, MI
Henri Schreifels	Forward	United States	23	Agoura Hills, CA; transfer from Rensselaer
Alexander Tertyshny	Defenseman	United States	23	Philadelphia, PA; transfer from American International

== Roster ==
As of September 20, 2023.

No.	Nat.	Player	Class	Pos	Height	Weight	DoB	Hometown	Previous team	NHL rights
2	(United States)	Greg Japchen	Sophomore	D	6' 4" (1.93 m)	205 lb (93 kg)	2001-12-17	Doylestown, Pennsylvania	Union (ECAC)	—
3	(United States)	Alexander Tertyshny	Sophomore (RS)	D	6' 0" (1.83 m)	185 lb (84 kg)	2000-01-03	Philadelphia, Pennsylvania	Northeast Generals (NAHL)	—
4	(Canada)	Charles Banquier	Freshman	D	6' 2" (1.88 m)	200 lb (91 kg)	2002-10-06	Oakville, Ontario	Prince George Spruce Kings (BCHL)	—
5	(United States)	Ryan Davies	Sophomore	D	5' 10" (1.78 m)	179 lb (81 kg)	2001-03-27	Arlington, Massachusetts	Valley Jr. Warriors (EHL)	—
7	(United States)	Cam Gaudette	Junior	D	6' 1" (1.85 m)	190 lb (86 kg)	2000-06-01	Braintree, Massachusetts	Northeastern (HEA)	—
8	(United States)	Cam Mannion	Junior	F	6' 1" (1.85 m)	202 lb (92 kg)	2001-10-31	Dorchester, Massachusetts	South Shore Kings (NCDC)	—
9	(United States)	Carter Rapalje (A)	Sophomore	F	5' 10" (1.78 m)	170 lb (77 kg)	2001-08-10	Colorado Springs, Colorado	North Iowa Bulls (NAHL)	—
10	(United States)	Joseph Grainda	Freshman	F	6' 3" (1.91 m)	190 lb (86 kg)	2002-08-01	Carmel, Indiana	Chippewa Steel (NAHL)	—
11	(United States)	Hunter Hastings	Freshman	F	6' 1" (1.85 m)	195 lb (88 kg)	2002-02-07	Scottsdale, Arizona	New Mexico Ice Wolves (NAHL)	—
12	(United States)	Conor Ronayne	Freshman	F	5' 11" (1.8 m)	179 lb (81 kg)	2002-07-29	Plymouth, Michigan	Smiths Falls Bears (CCHL)	—
13	(United States)	Michael Martignetti	Sophomore	D	5' 11" (1.8 m)	185 lb (84 kg)	2002-03-13	Winchester, Massachusetts	Worcester Jr. Railers (EHL)	—
14	(United States)	Max Pineo (C)	Senior	F	5' 10" (1.78 m)	175 lb (79 kg)	2000-08-07	North Reading, Massachusetts	Tilton School (USHS–NH)	—
16	(United States)	Jack Shemligian	Sophomore	D	6' 0" (1.83 m)	190 lb (86 kg)	2003-04-22	Southborough, Massachusetts	East Coast Wizards (EHL)	—
18	(United States)	Nolan FitzPatrick	Junior	F	6' 0" (1.83 m)	185 lb (84 kg)	2000-06-25	Bridgewater, Massachusetts	Thayer Academy (USHS–MA)	—
19	(United States)	Frank Ireland (A)	Sophomore	F	5' 11" (1.8 m)	185 lb (84 kg)	2001-02-06	South Easton, Massachusetts	Boston Junior Bruins (NCDC)	—
20	(United States)	Henri Schreifels	Junior	F	6' 2" (1.88 m)	195 lb (88 kg)	2000-07-01	Newbury Park, California	Rensselaer (ECAC)	—
21	(United States)	Devon Carlstorm	Freshman	D	6' 3" (1.91 m)	185 lb (84 kg)	2002-03-05	Palm Beach Gardens, Florida	Aberdeen Wings (NAHL)	—
22	(United States)	Jake Cady	Junior	F	5' 9" (1.75 m)	190 lb (86 kg)	2001-07-04	Raynham, Massachusetts	South Shore Kings (NCDC)	—
23	(Canada)	Justin Barker	Freshman	F	6' 1" (1.85 m)	185 lb (84 kg)	2002-11-07	Calgary, Alberta	Calgary Canucks (AJHL)	—
24	(United States)	Anthony Galante	Freshman	F	5' 11" (1.8 m)	175 lb (79 kg)	2002-04-18	Morganville, New Jersey	Johnstown Tomahawks (NAHL)	—
25	(Switzerland)	Dean Schwenninger	Sophomore	F	5' 9" (1.75 m)	170 lb (77 kg)	2001-03-05	Zürich, Switzerland	Minot Minotauros (NAHL)	—
27	(United States)	Cameron Collins	Sophomore	F	5' 10" (1.78 m)	175 lb (79 kg)	2002-09-04	Raynham, Massachusetts	East Coast Wizards (EHL)	—
30	(United States)	Dylan Ghaemi	Sophomore	G	6' 4" (1.93 m)	200 lb (91 kg)	2001-12-30	Fairport, New York	Järvso (Hockeytrean)	—
31	(Canada)	Dylan Meilun	Sophomore	G	6' 5" (1.96 m)	220 lb (100 kg)	2001-11-21	Winnipeg, Manitoba	Wisconsin–Superior (WIAC)	—
35	(United States)	Gavin FitzPatrick	Junior	G	6' 0" (1.83 m)	185 lb (84 kg)	2002-01-09	Bridgewater, Massachusetts	South Shore Kings (NCDC)	—
37	(United States)	Kyle Heath	Junior	F	5' 8" (1.73 m)	160 lb (73 kg)	2002-04-28	West Bridgewater, Massachusetts	Middlesex School (USHS–MA)	—
43	(United States)	Jake LaRusso	Freshman	F	5' 11" (1.8 m)	174 lb (79 kg)	2002-03-16	Colts Neck, New Jersey	Northeast Generals (NAHL)	—
44	(United States)	William Tripp	Sophomore	D	5' 11" (1.8 m)	160 lb (73 kg)	2002-05-17	Lakeville, Massachusetts	South Shore Kings (NCDC)	—
55	(United States)	Dominick Campione	Freshman	D	5' 11" (1.8 m)	154 lb (70 kg)	2002-11-25	Kohler, Wisconsin	Brooks Bandits (AJHL)	—

== Standings ==
2023–24 NCAA Division I Independent ice hockey standings
	Overall record					
	GP	W	L	T	GF	GA
Alaska	34	17	14	3	110	86
Alaska Anchorage	34	15	17	2	95	105
Arizona State	38	24	8	6	129	94
Lindenwood	28	6	18	4	74	121
Long Island	37	16	20	1	115	103
Stonehill	36	2	34	0	62	213
Rankings: USCHO.com Top 20 Poll

== Schedule and results ==
Date	Time	Opponent^{#}	Rank^{#}	Site	TV	Decision	Result	Attendance	Record
Regular Season
October 7	7:00 pm	at #19 Northeastern*		Matthews Arena • Boston, Massachusetts	ESPN+	Meilun	L 0–7	2,621	0–1–0
October 13	7:00 pm	at #13 Providence*		Schneider Arena • Providence, Rhode Island	ESPN+	Meilun	L 1–7	2,969	0–2–0
October 14	5:00 pm	Long Island*		Bridgewater Ice Arena • Bridgewater, Massachusetts	NEC Front Row	FitzPatrick	L 3–7	275	0–3–0
October 20	7:00 pm	at Bentley*		Bentley Arena • Waltham, Massachusetts	FloHockey	Meilun	L 0–2	1,350	0–4–0
October 21	6:00 pm	at Bentley*		Bentley Arena • Waltham, Massachusetts	FloHockey	Meilun	L 1–4	1,243	0–5–0
October 29	2:00 pm	at Brown*		Meehan Auditorium • Providence, Rhode Island	ESPN+	Meilun	L 2–7	488	0–6–0
October 30	7:30 pm	Long Island*		Bridgewater Ice Arena • Bridgewater, Massachusetts	NEC Front Row	Meilun	L 2–4	183	0–7–0
November 3	10:00 pm	at #16 Arizona State*		Mullett Arena • Tempe, Arizona		Meilun	L 4–5 ^{OT}	4,444	0–8–0
November 4	10:00 pm	at #16 Arizona State*		Mullett Arena • Tempe, Arizona		Meilun	L 2–3	4,487	0–9–0
November 10	7:00 pm	Alaska*		Bridgewater Ice Arena • Bridgewater, Massachusetts	NEC Front Row	Meilun	L 1–3	311	0–10–0
November 11	4:00 pm	Alaska*		Bridgewater Ice Arena • Bridgewater, Massachusetts	NEC Front Row	Meilun	L 1–8	318	0–11–0
November 18	5:00 pm	Anna Maria*		Bridgewater Ice Arena • Bridgewater, Massachusetts	NEC Front Row	FitzPatrick	L 2–4	279	0–12–0
November 24	7:00 pm	at Union*		Achilles Rink • Schenectady, New York	ESPN+	Meilun	L 2–5	1,283	0–13–0
November 25	4:00 pm	at Union*		Achilles Rink • Schenectady, New York	ESPN+	Meilun	L 0–4	1,115	0–14–0
December 1	7:00 pm	at Utica*		Adirondack Bank Center • Utica, New York (Exhibition)	WKTV	Meilun	L 2–7	3,998	
December 3	4:00 pm	Brown*		Bridgewater Ice Arena • Bridgewater, Massachusetts	NEC Front Row	Meilun	L 1–4	217	0–15–0
December 8	7:00 pm	at Clarkson*		Cheel Arena • Potsdam, New York	ESPN+	Meilun	L 1–5	2,133	0–16–0
December 31	2:00 pm	at Merrimack*		J. Thom Lawler Rink • North Andover, Massachusetts	ESPN+	Meilun	L 2–3	2,038	0–17–0
January 5	7:00 pm	at Robert Morris*		Clearview Arena • Neville Township, Pennsylvania	FloHockey	FitzPatrick	L 1–8	606	0–18–0
January 6	5:00 pm	at Robert Morris*		Clearview Arena • Neville Township, Pennsylvania	FloHockey	FitzPatrick	L 3–7	658	0–19–0
January 12	7:00 pm	at #15 Michigan*		Yost Ice Arena • Ann Arbor, Michigan		FitzPatrick	L 4–12	5,800	0–20–0
January 13	7:00 pm	at #15 Michigan*		Yost Ice Arena • Ann Arbor, Michigan		FitzPatrick	L 1–7	5,800	0–21–0
January 19	2:30 pm	at Long Island*		Northwell Health Ice Center • East Meadow, New York	ESPN+	FitzPatrick	L 2–8	250	0–22–0
January 20	2:00 pm	at Long Island*		Northwell Health Ice Center • East Meadow, New York	ESPN+	FitzPatrick	L 0–10	300	0–23–0
January 26	8:10 pm	at Lindenwood*		Centene Community Ice Center • St. Charles, Missouri		FitzPatrick	L 1–7	821	0–24–0
January 27	2:10 pm	at Lindenwood*		Centene Community Ice Center • St. Charles, Missouri		FitzPatrick	L 5–6 ^{OT}	672	0–25–0
February 2	7:00 pm	Long Island*		Bridgewater Ice Arena • Bridgewater, Massachusetts	NEC Front Row	Meilun	L 1–3	153	0–26–0
February 3	4:00 pm	Long Island*		Bridgewater Ice Arena • Bridgewater, Massachusetts	NEC Front Row	Meilun	L 0–5	198	0–27–0
February 9	7:00 pm	Lindenwood*		Bridgewater Ice Arena • Bridgewater, Massachusetts	NEC Front Row	Meilun	L 1–10	113	0–28–0
February 10	5:00 pm	Lindenwood*		Bridgewater Ice Arena • Bridgewater, Massachusetts	NEC Front Row	Meilun	W 4–2	178	1–28–0
February 14	7:00 pm	Assumption*		Bridgewater Ice Arena • Bridgewater, Massachusetts	NEC Front Row	Meilun	W 3–1	207	2–28–0
February 23	2:30 pm	at Long Island*		Northwell Health Ice Center • East Meadow, New York	ESPN+	Meilun	L 2–7	300	2–29–0
February 24	2:00 pm	at Long Island*		Northwell Health Ice Center • East Meadow, New York	ESPN+	Meilun	L 2–4	300	2–30–0
March 1	11:07 pm	at Alaska Anchorage*		Avis Alaska Sports Complex • Anchorage, Alaska		Meilun	L 3–9	680	2–31–0
March 2	7:07 pm	at Alaska Anchorage*		Avis Alaska Sports Complex • Anchorage, Alaska		FitzPatrick	L 2–12	580	2–32–0
March 6	11:07 pm	at Alaska*		Carlson Center • Fairbanks, Alaska	FloHockey	Meilun	L 1–9	1,978	2–33–0
March 7	11:07 pm	at Alaska*		Carlson Center • Fairbanks, Alaska	FloHockey	Meilun	L 1–4	2,001	2–34–0
*Non-conference game. ^{#}Rankings from USCHO.com Poll. All times are in Eastern Time. Source:

== Scoring statistics ==
Name	Position	Games	Goals	Assists	Points	PIM
Frank Ireland	F	36	9	9	18	23
Henri Schreifels	F	36	8	8	16	28
Greg Japchen	D	30	3	11	14	10
Dean Schwenninger	F	36	4	9	13	32
Jake Cady	F	26	5	4	9	25
Kyle Heath	F	35	1	7	8	10
Anthony Galante	F	33	5	3	8	10
Conor Ronayne	F	35	2	5	7	32
Dominick Campione	D	24	3	4	7	41
Joseph Grainda	F	22	3	4	7	10
William Tripp	D	25	0	7	7	21
Justin Barker	F	24	4	3	7	10
Cameron Gaudette	D	35	1	4	5	36
Max Pineo	F	30	3	2	5	10
Jake LaRusso	F	19	3	2	5	10
Matt Allen	F	22	3	1	4	25
Alexander Tertyshny	D	30	0	4	4	16
Charles Banquier	D	16	2	2	4	28
Devon Carlstrom	D	35	0	3	3	10
Ryan Davies	D	19	1	2	3	2
Nolan FitzPatrick	F	20	1	1	2	15
Ryan King	F	13	1	0	1	10
Cameron Collins	F	18	0	1	1	2
Dylan Meilun	G	26	0	0	0	2
Gavin FitzPatrick	G	14	0	0	0	0
Cam Mannion	D	18	0	0	0	8
Dylan Ghaemi	G	1	0	0	0	0
Michael Martignetti	D	4	0	0	0	4
Hunter Hastings	D	34	0	0	0	18
Jack Shemligian	D	4	0	0	0	2
Total			62	96	158	460

== Goaltending statistics ==
Name	Games	Minutes	Wins	Losses	Ties	Goals Against	Saves	Shut Outs	SV %	GAA
Dylan Meilun	26	1456:41	2	24	0	122	850	0	.874	5.03
Dylan Ghaemi	1	18:20	0	0	0	2	13	0	.867	6.55
Gavin FitzPatrick	14	675:03	0	10	0	85	380	0	.817	7.55
Empty Net	-	15:49	-	-	-	4	-	-	-	-
Total	36	2165:53	2	34	0	213	1243	0	.854	5.90

== Rankings ==
Poll	Week																										
Poll	Pre	1	2	3	4	5	6	7	8	9	10	11	12	13	14	15	16	17	18	19	20	21	22	23	24	25	26 (Final)
USCHO.com	NR	NR	NR	NR	NR	NR	NR	NR	NR	NR	NR	–	NR	NR	NR	NR	NR	NR	NR	NR	NR	NR	NR	NR	NR	–	NR
USA Hockey	NR	NR	NR	NR	NR	NR	NR	NR	NR	NR	NR	NR	–	NR	NR	NR	NR	NR	NR	NR	NR	NR	NR	NR	NR	NR	NR

Note: USCHO did not release a poll in weeks 11 and 25.
Note: USA Hockey did not release a poll in week 12.
