= 2015–16 NCAA Division II men's ice hockey season =

- Duration: October 23, 2015– February 27, 2016
- NCAA tournament: 2016

The 2015–16 NCAA Division II men's ice hockey season began on October 23, 2015 and concluded on February 27, 2016. This was the 34th season of second-tier college ice hockey.

== Regular season ==
=== Standings ===
2015–16 Northeast-10 Conference ice hockey standings
	Conference								Overall					
	GP	W	L	T	PTS	GF	GA		GP	W	L	T	GF	GA
Stonehill †*	10	7	1	2	9	39	18		26	13	9	4	86	79
Saint Anselm	5	4	1	0	8	21	12		26	12	11	3	72	64
Southern New Hampshire	11	4	3	4	5	34	30		26	8	14	4	73	99
Assumption	9	2	6	1	4	28	38		25	9	12	4	88	97
Saint Michael's	5	2	3	0	4	12	20		24	6	18	0	51	105
Franklin Pierce	8	0	5	3	0	13	29	^	22	4	15	3	45	84
Championship: February 27, 2016 † indicates conference regular season champion * indicates conference tournament champions^ Franklin Pierce cancelled the final three games of its season due to a hazing incident. Saint Anselm and Saint Michael's remained members of the ECAC East and only played a partial Northeast-10 schedule. As a result only one game between each of the conference members was counted in the standings.

== See also ==
- 2015–16 NCAA Division I men's ice hockey season
- 2015–16 NCAA Division III men's ice hockey season
