= Post Eagles =

- University: Post University
- Conference: Central Atlantic Collegiate Conference; NEWHA (women's ice hockey); Northeast-10 Conference (men's ice hockey, football)
- Division: Division II
- Athletic director: Karin Mann
- Location: Waterbury, Connecticut
- Varsity teams: 17: 16 NCAA DII, 1 DI
- Football stadium: Municipal Stadium
- Basketball arena: Drubner Center
- Ice hockey arena: Sports Center of Connecticut
- Baseball stadium: Municipal Stadium
- Volleyball arena: Drubner Center
- Mascot: Swoop
- Nickname: Eagles
- Colors: Purple and Orange
- Website: posteagles.com
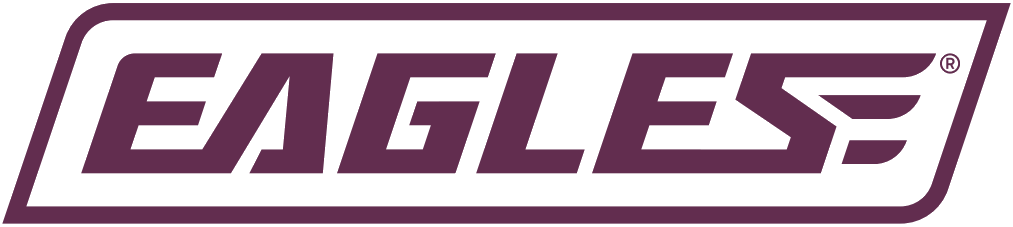

The Post Eagles are composed of 17 teams representing Post University in intercollegiate athletics, including basketball, cross country, golf, ice hockey, lacrosse, and soccer. Additionally, men's sports include baseball and football, while women's sports include softball, tennis, and volleyball. The Eagles compete in the NCAA Division II and the Central Atlantic Collegiate Conference. The exceptions include women's ice hockey, which competes at the NCAA National Collegiate level (Divisions I and II) as part of the New England Women's Hockey Alliance, while men's ice hockey and football compete in the Northeast 10 Conference (football will also join the NE-10 in 2024).

In February 2025, Post University announced it will launch a women’s flag football club in spring 2026, making it the first college in Connecticut to offer the sport at the collegiate level. The program will initially compete as a club before transitioning toward varsity status in subsequent seasons. University officials cited increased national participation in women’s flag football and broader efforts to expand opportunities for female athletes as factors in the decision.

== Teams ==
Men's	Women's	
Baseball	Basketball	
Basketball	Cross Country	
Cross Country	Golf	
Football	Ice Hockey	
Golf	Lacrosse	
Ice Hockey	Soccer	
Lacrosse	Softball	
Soccer	Tennis	
Tennis	Volleyball	Esports

== Championships ==
Past CACC championship teams.

Men's basketball

- CACC champion (2003)
- CACC Regular Season Champions (2008, 2021)
- NCAA appearances (2024)

Men's golf

- Individual Tournament Win 2008-2010, 2018, 2024
- (5×) CACC champion 2006–2010
- (12x) NCAA Regional appearances 2005–2013, 2016-2019, 2022-2024
- NCAA National Championship appearance 2012
- (2x) GCCA Academic National Championship 2012–2013

Men's soccer

- CACC champion 2008, 2018-2019, 2021-2023
- (4x) CACC regular-season champions 2011–2013, 2021-2024
- (2x) ECAC champions 2014, 2015
- NCAA Tournament 2012-2013, 2018-2019, 2021-2024
- NCAA Regionals 2012-2013, 2018-2019, 2022-2024
- NCAA Sweet 16 (2019, 2022-2024)

Men's track and field

- Individual CACC Champions - 100m, 2014; 800m, 2015

Men's Tennis

- NCAA Regional appearance 2017

Women's Soccer

- ECAC Champion Appearance 2014
- ECAC Champion 2015

Women's Softball

- CACC Champion 2003
- ECAC Tournament Appearance 2003-2004

Women's Cross Country

- CACC Individual Champ (Kendall, Fitzgerald, 2016-2018)
- NCAA Individual East Region Champ 2018, NCAA East Region Runner-Up 2017
- NCAA Individual Qualifier 2018, 2019

Women's Track and Field

- Individual CACC Champions - 100m, 2014; 100m and 200m, 2015

Women's volleyball

- (2×) CACC champion 2014, 2015
- (4x) CACC Regular Season Champion 2015-2016, 2018, 2024
- (3×) NCAA Regional appearances 2014, 2015, 2016

Esports

- (2×) ECAC Champion (NBA2k, Valorant) 2023
- (2x) NECC Conference Champion (Rocket League) 2023, 2024
- (1x) NECC National Champion (Rocket League) 2024

== Non-varsity programs ==
Non-varsity programs include cheerleading and flag football.
