= Franklin Pierce Ravens =

Division II team

- University: Franklin Pierce University
- NCAA: Division II; Division I (women's ice hockey)
- Conference: Northeast-10 Conference; NEWHA (women's ice hockey)
- Athletic director: Matt Johnson
- Location: Rindge, New Hampshire
- Varsity teams: 22 (10 men's, 12 women's)
- Football stadium: Sodexo Field
- Basketball arena: FPU Fieldhouse
- Ice hockey arena: Jason Ritchie Ice Arena
- Baseball stadium: Arthur and Martha Pappas Field
- Softball stadium: Melissa Bisaccia Memorial Softfall Complex
- Soccer stadium: Sodexo Field
- Lacrosse stadium: Sodexo Field
- Nickname: Ravens
- Colors: Crimson and gray
- Mascot: Rocky the Raven
- Fight song: Go Ravens! Go Ravens!
- Website: fpuravens.com

The Franklin Pierce Ravens are the intercollegiate athletic teams that represent Franklin Pierce University, located in Rindge, New Hampshire, in NCAA sporting competitions. Franklin Pierce competes at the Division II level in 22 varsity sports.

In terms of conferences, the Ravens are primarily members of the Northeast-10 Conference, of which it has been a member since 2000. The three exceptions are the women's bowling team, which is a member of the East Coast Conference; the women's ice hockey team, which competes at the National Collegiate (Division I) level in the New England Women's Hockey Alliance (NEWHA), where it began play in Division I in 2019; and the women's rowing team, which competes as an independent.

== Varsity teams ==
Men's sports	Women's sports
Baseball	Basketball
Basketball	Cross country
Cross country	Field hockey
Football	Golf
Golf	Ice hockey
Ice hockey	Lacrosse
Lacrosse	Rowing
Soccer	Soccer
Tennis	Softball
Track and field	Tennis
	Track and field
	Volleyball

== Facilities ==
Athletic facilities on the Rindge campus include Melissa Bisaccia Memorial Softball Complex, Dr. Arthur and Martha Pappas Field, Sodexo Field, the Franklin Pierce Fieldhouse, and the Grimshaw-Gudewicz Activity Center at Northfields.

== National championships ==
The women's soccer team has won five national championships (1994, 1995, 1996, 1997, and 1999), and the men's soccer team has won three (2007 and 2022, 2023). The women's basketball team has won three regional championships.

=== Team ===
Sport	Association	Division	Year	Opponent	Score
Men's Soccer (3)	NCAA	Division II	2007	Lincoln Memorial	1–0
Men's Soccer (3)	NCAA	Division II	2022	CSU Pueblo	2–0
Men's Soccer (3)	NCAA	Division II	2023	CSU Pueblo	4–0
Women's Soccer (5)	NCAA	Division II	1994	Regis	2–0
Women's Soccer (5)	NCAA	Division II	1995	Barry	5–0
Women's Soccer (5)	NCAA	Division II	1996	Lynn	1–0
Women's Soccer (5)	NCAA	Division II	1997	West Virginia Wesleyan	3–0
Women's Soccer (5)	NCAA	Division II	1999	Cal Poly Pomona	3–1
