= Dean Fuller =

American ice hockey coach

Current position
- Title: Head Coach
- Team: Fitchburg State
- Conference: MASCAC

Biographical details
- Born: Beverly, Massachusetts
- Education: Fitchburg State University

Playing career
- 1975–1978: Fitchburg State
- Position: Defenseman

Coaching career (HC unless noted)
- 1978–1983: Fitchburg State (assistant)
- 1984–Present: Fitchburg State

Head coaching record
- Overall: 588–345–61 (.622)

Dean Fuller is a college men's ice hockey coach. Fuller has been the head coach of the program at Fitchburg State University since 1984, recording more than 500 wins in that time.

== Career ==
Fuller played for the men's ice hockey team for four years, graduating in 1978 with a degree in special education. Fuller remained with the team as an assistant coach under Jim Gorman. Two years later, after Gorman's retirement, Fuller took over the position. Over the next 15 seasons Fuller built the Falcons into a powerhouse in their conference, winning multiple championships throughout the 90's. After a conference realignment in the late-90's, After the MASCAC began sponsoring ice hockey in 2009, Fuller led Fitchburg to a pair of conference titles as well as the program's first appearance in the NCAA Tournament.

When Fitchburg cancelled their 2020–21 season due to the COVID-19 pandemic, Fuller was 19th all-time with 561 wins.

== Head coaching record ==
Record table
| Season | Team | Overall | Conference | Standing | Postseason |
|---|---|---|---|---|---|
Fitchburg State Falcons (ECAC 3) (1984–1985)
| 1984–85 | Fitchburg State | 17–11–0 | 16–4–0 | 5th | ECAC 3 Quarterfinals |
| Fitchburg State: | | 17–11–0 | 16–4–0 | | |
Fitchburg State Falcons (ECAC North/South) (1985–1992)
| 1985–86 | Fitchburg State | 16–10–0 | 15–5–0 | T–5th | ECAC North Division Semifinals |
| 1986–87 | Fitchburg State | 19–9–0 | 15–4–0 | 6th | ECAC North Division Runner-Up |
| 1987–88 | Fitchburg State | 22–6–1 | 18–1–1 | 4th | ECAC North/South Runner-Up |
| 1988–89 | Fitchburg State | 18–10–0 | 14–6–0 | T–8th | ECAC North Division Semifinals |
| 1989–90 | Fitchburg State | 21–7–0 | 17–4–0 | 4th | ECAC North/South Champion |
| 1990–91 | Fitchburg State | 21–5–0 | 17–0–0 | 1st | ECAC North/South Runner-Up |
| 1991–92 | Fitchburg State | 17–9–1 | 14–2–1 | 2nd | ECAC North/South Runner-Up |
| Fitchburg State: | | 134–56–2 | 110–22–2 | | |
Fitchburg State Falcons (ECAC Central) (1992–1998)
| 1992–93 | Fitchburg State | 11–10–2 | 10–4–2 | T–3rd | ECAC North/South/Central Quarterfinals |
| 1993–94 | Fitchburg State | 18–5–1 | 13–2–1 | 1st | ECAC North/South/Central Champion |
| 1994–95 | Fitchburg State | 22–6–0 | 16–0–0 | 1st | ECAC North/South/Central Runner-Up |
| 1995–96 | Fitchburg State | 20–6–0 | 12–2–0 | 1st | ECAC North/South/Central Runner-Up |
| 1996–97 | Fitchburg State | 18–9–2 | 10–2–0 | 1st | ECAC North/South/Central Runner-Up |
| 1997–98 | Fitchburg State | 21–5–1 | 14–1–1 | 1st | ECAC North/South/Central Semifinals |
| Fitchburg State: | | 110–41–6 | 75–11–4 | | |
Fitchburg State Falcons (ECAC Northeast) (1998–2009)
| 1998–99 | Fitchburg State | 20–5–3 | 14–1–2 | T–1st | ECAC Northeast Champion |
| 1999–00 | Fitchburg State | 18–6–4 | 10–1–2 | 2nd | ECAC Northeast Runner-Up |
| 2000–01 | Fitchburg State | 11–13–2 | 9–7–1 | T–6th | ECAC Northeast Quarterfinals |
| 2001–02 | Fitchburg State | 15–9–2 | 9–6–0 | 6th | ECAC Northeast Quarterfinals |
| 2002–03 | Fitchburg State | 16–8–2 | 12–3–1 | 4th | ECAC Northeast Semifinals |
| 2003–04 | Fitchburg State | 9–13–2 | 7–6–3 | 6th | ECAC Northeast Quarterfinals |
| 2004–05 | Fitchburg State | 12–12–1 | 8–6–1 | 5th | ECAC Northeast Quarterfinals |
| 2005–06 | Fitchburg State | 14–11–1 | 8–7–0 | T–6th | ECAC Northeast Quarterfinals |
| 2006–07 | Fitchburg State | 14–10–3 | 9–4–2 | 5th | ECAC Northeast Semifinals |
| 2007–08 | Fitchburg State | 13–10–4 | 8–5–3 | T–6th | ECAC Northeast Semifinals |
| 2008–09 | Fitchburg State | 13–9–5 | 9–5–3 | 5th | ECAC Northeast Semifinals |
| Fitchburg State: | | 155–106–29 | 103–51–18 | | |
Fitchburg State Falcons (MASCAC) (2009–present)
| 2009–10 | Fitchburg State | 20–6–1 | 14–4–0 | 1st | MASCAC Runner-Up |
| 2010–11 | Fitchburg State | 18–9–1 | 9–8–1 | 4th | MASCAC Champion |
| 2011–12 | Fitchburg State | 9–13–4 | 8–7–3 | 4th | MASCAC Quarterfinals |
| 2012–13 | Fitchburg State | 11–14–2 | 9–8–1 | 5th | MASCAC Semifinals |
| 2013–14 | Fitchburg State | 11–14–1 | 8–9–3 | 5th | MASCAC Semifinals |
| 2014–15 | Fitchburg State | 10–13–3 | 8–8–2 | T–3rd | MASCAC Quarterfinals |
| 2015–16 | Fitchburg State | 11–14–2 | 7–9–2 | 3rd | MASCAC Semifinals |
| 2016–17 | Fitchburg State | 11–15–1 | 7–10–1 | 4th | MASCAC Semifinals |
| 2017–18 | Fitchburg State | 18–7–3 | 11–4–3 | 2nd | NCAA First Round |
| 2018–19 | Fitchburg State | 12–12–2 | 9–7–2 | 5th | MASCAC Quarterfinals |
| 2019–20 | Fitchburg State | 14–8–4 | 11–3–4 | 2nd | MASCAC Semifinals |
| Fitchburg State: | | 145–125–24 | 101–77–22 | | |
| Total: | | 561–339–61 | | | |
National champion Postseason invitational champion Conference regular season champion Conference regular season and conference tournament champion Division regular season champion Division regular season and conference tournament champion Conference tournament champion

== See also ==
- List of college men's ice hockey coaches with 400 wins
