= MASCAC men's ice hockey tournament =

Massachusetts State Collegiate Athletic Conference men's hockey tournament
- Conference hockey championship
- Sport: Ice hockey
- Conference: MASCAC
- Format: Single-elimination
- Played: 2010–Present

== History ==
The MASCAC was founded in 1971 but did not begin sponsoring men's ice hockey as a sport until 2009. That season the five full member schools formed the ice hockey division along with two schools from the Little East and began a conference schedule. The MASCAC also started a conference tournament in its inaugural year however, despite having the requisite number of teams, it did not receive an automatic bid for the NCAA Tournament until 2012. The 2021 tournament was cancelled due to the COVID-19 pandemic.

== 2010 ==
Seed	School	Conference Record	Seed	School	Conference Record
1	Fitchburg State	14–4–0	4	Westfield State	10–5–3
2	Salem State	11–3–4	5	Massachusetts–Dartmouth	5–12–1
3	Plymouth State	12–5–1	6	Worcester State	3–13–2

Quarterfinals; March 2
4	Westfield State	3
5	Massachusetts–Dartmouth	4
3	Plymouth State	7
6	Worcester State	3

Semifinals; March 4
1	Fitchburg State	3
5	Massachusetts–Dartmouth	2
2	Salem State	6
3	Plymouth State	1

Championship; March 6
1	Fitchburg State	1
2	Salem State	2*

Note: * denotes overtime period(s)

== 2011 ==
Seed	School	Conference Record	Seed	School	Conference Record
1	Massachusetts–Dartmouth	13–4–1	4	Fitchburg State	9–8–1
2	Salem State	11–5–2	5	Worcester State	7–10–1
3	Plymouth State	10–5–3	6	Westfield State	4–13–1

Quarterfinals; March 1
4	Fitchburg State	3
5	Worcester State	0
3	Plymouth State	1
6	Westfield State	4

Semifinals; March 3
1	Massachusetts–Dartmouth	3
4	Fitchburg State	4**
2	Salem State	3*
6	Westfield State	2

Championship; March 5
4	Fitchburg State	6*
2	Salem State	5

Note: * denotes overtime period(s)

== 2012 ==
Seed	School	Conference Record	Seed	School	Conference Record
1	Plymouth State	12–3–3	4	Fitchburg State	8–7–3
2	Salem State	11–4–3	5	Worcester State	5–11–2
3	Massachusetts–Dartmouth	10–6–2	6	Westfield State	4–10–4

Quarterfinals; February 25
4	Fitchburg State	1
5	Worcester State	4
3	Massachusetts–Dartmouth	4
6	Westfield State	2

Semifinals; February 28
1	Plymouth State	7
5	Worcester State	1
2	Salem State	4*
3	Massachusetts–Dartmouth	3

Championship; March 3
1	Plymouth State	5**
2	Salem State	4

Note: * denotes overtime period(s)

== 2013 ==
Seed	School	Conference Record	Seed	School	Conference Record
1	Plymouth State	14–3–1	4	Westfield State	9–6–3
2	Massachusetts–Dartmouth	9–3–6	5	Fitchburg State	9–8–1
3	Salem State	10–7–1	6	Worcester State	3–12–3

Quarterfinals; February 23
4	Westfield State	3
5	Fitchburg State	4
3	Salem State	5
6	Worcester State	0

Semifinals; February 26
1	Plymouth State	7
5	Fitchburg State	1
2	Massachusetts–Dartmouth	5***
3	Salem State	4

Championship; March 2
1	Plymouth State	1
2	Massachusetts–Dartmouth	2

Note: * denotes overtime period(s)

== 2014 ==
Seed	School	Conference Record	Seed	School	Conference Record
1	Salem State	11–5–2	4	Framingham State	8–7–3
2	Plymouth State	11–5–2	5	Fitchburg State	8–9–1
3	Westfield State	10–7–1	6	Worcester State	5–12–1

Quarterfinals; March 1
4	Framingham State	7
5	Fitchburg State	1
3	Westfield State	1
6	Worcester State	0

Semifinals; March 4
1	Salem State	3
4	Framingham State	1
2	Plymouth State	3
3	Westfield State	2

Championship; March 8
1	Salem State	5
2	Plymouth State	1

Note: * denotes overtime period(s)

== 2015 ==
Seed	School	Conference Record	Seed	School	Conference Record
1	Plymouth State	14–3–1	4	Westfield State	8–8–2
2	Salem State	9–7–2	5	Worcester State	7–10–1
3	Fitchburg State	8–8–2	6	Massachusetts–Dartmouth	6–9–3

Quarterfinals; February 28
4	Westfield State	6
5	Worcester State	4
3	Fitchburg State	4
6	Massachusetts–Dartmouth	5

Semifinals; March 3
1	Plymouth State	3
5	Westfield State	0
2	Salem State	4
6	Massachusetts–Dartmouth	0

Championship; March 7
1	Plymouth State	6
2	Salem State	2

Note: * denotes overtime period(s)

== 2016 ==
Seed	School	Conference Record	Seed	School	Conference Record
1	Salem State	16–2–0	4	Massachusetts–Dartmouth	6–9–3
2	Plymouth State	15–2–1	5	Westfield State	7–11–0
3	Fitchburg State	7–9–2	6	Framingham State	5–12–1

Quarterfinals; February 27
4	Massachusetts–Dartmouth	2
5	Westfield State	4
3	Fitchburg State	4
6	Framingham State	0

Semifinals; March 1
1	Salem State	5*
5	Westfield State	4
2	Plymouth State	6
3	Fitchburg State	2

Championship; March 5
1	Salem State	4
2	Plymouth State	0

Note: * denotes overtime period(s)

=== Quarterfinals ===
==== (4) Massachusetts–Dartmouth vs. (5) Westfield State ====
February 27	Massachusetts–Dartmouth	2 – 4	Westfield State	Hetland Arena	Recap
No scoring		First period	Kyllian Kirkwood (4) – 07:14
07:46 – pp – Mike Kelly (9)		Second period	Roman Pfennings (8) – 13:36
14:46 – Mike Kelly (10)		Third period	Nik Passero (8) – 09:39; Dalton Jay (18) – en – 19:37
Drew Michals (34 saves / 37 shots)		Goalie stats	Jonathan Loparco (36 saves / 38 shots)

==== (3) Fitchburg State vs. (6) Framingham State ====
February 27	Fitchburg State	4 – 0	Framingham State	Wallace Civic Center	Recap
01:22 – James Gordon (4)		First period	No scoring
09:36 – pp – John Celli (13)		Second period	No scoring
05:56 – pp – John Celli (14); 17:19 – Ryan Connolly (12)		Third period	No scoring
Charles Jakobsson (25 saves / 25 shots)		Goalie stats	Alessio Muggli (32 saves / 36 shots)

=== Semifinals ===
==== (1) Salem State vs. (5) Westfield State ====
March 1	Salem State	5 – 4	OT	Westfield State	Rockett Arena	Recap
08:54 – Michael Casale (14); 10:48 – Brandon Platt (6); 12:47 – Michael Casale (15); 15:12 – Andrew Bettencourt (8)		First period		Wyatt Trumbley (3) – 19:51
No scoring		Second period		Aaron Clancy (10) – 02:49; Dalton Jay (19) – 08:08; Johnny Orlando (3) – 13:20
No scoring		Third period		No scoring
05:30 – Cam Moniz (18)		First overtime period		No scoring
Marcus Zelzer (31 saves / 35 shots)		Goalie stats		Jonathan Loparco (20 saves / 25 shots)

==== (2) Plymouth State vs. (3) Fitchburg State ====
March 1	Plymouth State	6 – 2	Fitchburg State	Plymouth State University Ice Arena	Recap
No scoring		First period	No scoring
12:47 – sh – Andrew Wigg (10); 14:48 – pp – Tommy Dowell (1); 17:09 – Dan Dupell (12)		Second period	Ryan Connolly (13) – 05:07
04:14 – Ryan Callahan (4); 09:37 – pp – Josh Woody (11); 14:48 – Ian McGilvrey (6)		Third period	Ricky Kramer (3) – 08:32
Gordon Ceasar (23 saves / 25 shots)		Goalie stats	Charles Jakobsson (25 saves / 30 shots); Corey McMahon (3 saves / 4 shots)

=== Finals ===
==== (1) Salem State vs. (2) Plymouth State ====
March 1	Salem State	4 – 0	Plymouth State	Rockett Arena	Recap
No scoring		First period	No scoring
04:30 – Keaton Cashin (1); 07:30 – Brandon Platt (7); 13:05 – Daniel Campbell (6)		Second period	No scoring
17:00 – pp – Cam Moniz (19)		Third period	No scoring
Marcus Zelzer (25 saves / 25 shots)		Goalie stats	Gordon Ceasar (34 saves / 38 shots)

== 2017 ==
Seed	School	Conference Record	Seed	School	Conference Record
1	Plymouth State	16–1–1	4	Fitchburg State	7–10–1
2	Salem State	12–4–2	5	Worcester State	6–10–2
3	Massachusetts–Dartmouth	12–6–0	6	Westfield State	6–12–0

Quarterfinals; February 27
4	Fitchburg State	3
5	Worcester State	2
3	Massachusetts–Dartmouth	0
6	Westfield State	3

Semifinals; March 1
1	Plymouth State	7
4	Fitchburg State	1
2	Salem State	1
6	Worcester State	0

Championship; March 5
1	Plymouth State	3
2	Salem State	4

Note: * denotes overtime period(s)

== 2018 ==
Seed	School	Conference Record	Seed	School	Conference Record
1	Plymouth State	15–2–1	4	Massachusetts–Dartmouth	7–8–3
2	Fitchburg State	11–4–3	5	Westfield State	8–10–0
3	Worcester State	8–8–2	6	Salem State	6–9–3

Quarterfinals; February 27
4	Massachusetts–Dartmouth	5*
5	Westfield State	4
3	Worcester State	2
6	Salem State	3

Semifinals; March 1
1	Plymouth State	1
4	Massachusetts–Dartmouth	3
2	Fitchburg State	5
6	Salem State	2

Championship; March 5
4	Massachusetts–Dartmouth	0
2	Fitchburg State	2

Note: * denotes overtime period(s)

== 2019 ==
Seed	School	Conference Record	Seed	School	Conference Record
1	Plymouth State	12–4–2	4	Worcester State	9–7–2
2	Westfield State	11–6–1	5	Fitchburg State	9–7–2
3	Massachusetts–Dartmouth	10–6–2	6	Salem State	7–11–0

Quarterfinals; February 23
4	Worcester State	5
5	Fitchburg State	3
3	Massachusetts–Dartmouth	3
6	Salem State	4

Semifinals; February 26
1	Plymouth State	6
4	Worcester State	1
2	Westfield State	2
6	Salem State	5

Championship; March 2
1	Plymouth State	3
6	Salem State	0

Note: * denotes overtime period(s)

== 2020 ==
Seed	School	Conference Record	Seed	School	Conference Record
1	Plymouth State	13–3–2	4	Westfield State	9–7–2
2	Fitchburg State	11–3–4	5	Salem State	4–9–5
3	Massachusetts–Dartmouth	10–6–2	6	Worcester State	4–13–1

Quarterfinals; February 29
4	Westfield State	3
5	Salem State	2
3	Massachusetts–Dartmouth	6
6	Worcester State	0

Semifinals; March 3
1	Plymouth State	4
4	Westfield State	2
2	Fitchburg State	0
3	Massachusetts–Dartmouth	4

Championship; March 7
1	Plymouth State	6
3	Massachusetts–Dartmouth	2

Note: * denotes overtime period(s)

== 2022 ==
Seed	School	Conference Record	Seed	School	Conference Record
1	Plymouth State	14–2–2–0	5	Westfield State	7–9–2–0
2	Fitchburg State	14–3–1–0	6	Salem State	8–10–0–0
3	Worcester State	8–8–2–0	7	Framingham State	1–16–1–0
4	Massachusetts–Dartmouth	6–10–2–3			

Quarterfinals; February 26
4	Massachusetts–Dartmouth	1
5	Westfield State	2*
2	Fitchburg State	0
7	Framingham State	1*
3	Worcester State	3
6	Salem State	4

Semifinals; March 1
1	Plymouth State	8
7	Framingham State	4
5	Westfield State	2
6	Salem State	4

Championship; March 5
1	Plymouth State	8
6	Salem State	4

Note: * denotes overtime period(s)

== 2023 ==
Seed	School	Conference Record	Seed	School	Conference Record
1	Plymouth State	18–0–0–1–0	4	Westfield State	6–11–1–0–2
2	Worcester State	12–5–1–0–0	5	Massachusetts–Dartmouth	6–11–1–0–1
3	Fitchburg State	9–6–3–1–2	6	Salem State	5–13–0–2–0

Quarterfinals; February 25 ^{†}
3	Fitchburg State	2
6	Salem State	6
4	Westfield State	5
5	Massachusetts–Dartmouth	3

Semifinals; March 1 ^{‡}
1	Plymouth State	6
4	Westfield State	2
2	Worcester State	5*
6	Salem State	4

Championship; March 4
1	Plymouth State	5
2	Worcester State	2

Note: * denotes overtime period(s)
† Game at Fitchburg postponed from Feb. 23
‡ Game at Worcester postponed from Feb. 28
| class="col-break col-break-2" |

== 2024 ==
Seed	School	Conference Record	Seed	School	Conference Record
1	Plymouth State	18–1–2–1–0	4	Westfield State	9–10–2–1–1
2	Fitchburg State	13–6–2–2–0	5	Framingham State	8–11–2–1–2
3	Massachusetts–Dartmouth	13–8–0–1–2	6	Worcester State	7–14–0–0–1

Quarterfinals; February 22
3	Massachusetts–Dartmouth	4
6	Worcester State	2
4	Westfield State	4
5	Framingham State	0

Semifinals; February 24
1	Plymouth State	5
4	Westfield State	1
2	Fitchburg State	2*
3	Massachusetts–Dartmouth	1

Championship; March 2
1	Plymouth State	3
2	Fitchburg State	0

Note: * denotes overtime period(s)

== 2025 ==
Seed	School	Conference Record	Seed	School	Conference Record
1	Plymouth State	16–2–0–2–0	5	Worcester State	8–8–2–0–1
2	Anna Maria	14–4–0–1–0	6	Massachusetts Dartmouth	8–9–1–1–1
3	Salem State	14–4–0–1–0	7	Westfield State	8–10–0–1–1
4	Fitchburg State	8–9–1–1–3	8	MCLA	4–12–2–1–2

Quarterfinals; February 27
1	Plymouth State	1
8	MCLA	2
2	Anna Maria	8
7	Westfield State	2
3	Salem State	3
6	Massachusetts Dartmouth	1
4	Fitchburg State	4
5	Worcester State	1

Semifinals; March 1–2
2	Anna Maria	1
8	MCLA	2
3	Salem State	3
4	Fitchburg State	4***

Championship; March 8
8	MCLA	0
4	Fitchburg State	3

Note: * denotes overtime period(s)

== 2026 ==
Seed	School	Conference Record	Seed	School	Conference Record
1	Anna Maria	12–1–1–0–0	4	Salem State	6–5–3–0–0
2	Fitchburg State	10–4–0–1–0	5	MCLA	5–8–1–0–0
3	Westfield State	9–3–2–0–0	6	Worcester State	3–8–3–0–2

Quarterfinals; February 26
3	Westfield State	5
6	Worcester State	0
4	Salem State	2
5	MCLA	3

Semifinals; February 28
1	Anna Maria	3*
5	MCLA	2
2	Fitchburg State	3
3	Westfield State	4*

Championship; March 7
1	Anna Maria	3
3	Westfield State	0

Note: * denotes overtime period(s)

== Championships ==
School	Championships
Plymouth State	8
Salem State	4
Fitchburg State	3
Anna Maria	1
Massachusetts Dartmouth	1

== See also ==
- ECAC Northeast Tournament
