= Once Upon a Mattress (film) =

2005 TV film

- Genre: Musical; Comedy
- Based on: Once Upon a Mattress by Marshall Barer, Dean Fuller, Jay Thompson, and Mary Rodgers
- Screenplay by: Janet Brownell
- Directed by: Kathleen Marshall
- Starring: Carol Burnett; Denis O'Hare; Tracey Ullman; Tom Smothers; Matthew Morrison; Edward Hibbert; Michael Boatman; Zooey Deschanel
- Theme music composer: Mary Rodgers; Marshall Barer; Michael Kosarin; Danny Troob
- Original language: English

Production
- Executive producers: Marty Tudor; Carol Burnett; Marc Platt
- Producers: Janet Brownell; John Peter Kousakis
- Production locations: Vancouver, Canada
- Cinematography: Robert McLachlan
- Editor: Scott Vickrey
- Running time: 87 minutes
- Production companies: Tudor Television; Mabel Cat Inc. Marc Platt Productions; Touchstone Television

Original release
- Network: ABC
- Release: December 18, 2005

Once Upon a Mattress is a 2005 made-for-television musical comedy film directed by Kathleen Marshall. The teleplay by Janet Brownell is based on the 1959 musical of the same name, which in turn was based on the 1835 fairytale The Princess and the Pea by Hans Christian Andersen. It had previously been made into a TV movie in 1972, but with Carol Burnett in her original stage role of Princess Winnifred - she is Queen Aggravain in this 2005 version. It stars Burnett, Denis O'Hare, and Tracey Ullman and features Tom Smothers, Matthew Morrison, Edward Hibbert, Michael Boatman, and Zooey Deschanel. This 2nd version aired on December 18, 2005 on ABC as the eighth episode of the forty-seventh season of The Wonderful World of Disney and is the last original television movie from that series. It received moderate to positive reviews and was nominated for two Primetime Emmy Awards.

== Plot ==
The original airing on The Wonderful World of Disney had an introductory scene taking place in the present day at the Magic Kingdom in Walt Disney World, where a little girl asks the other Disney Princesses such as Snow White and Belle about Princess Winnifred. The girl then bumps into Carol Burnett who begins to tell her the story.

A chorus introduces a kingdom where no one can marry until Prince Dauntless does, but his mother, Queen Aggravain, has incredibly high standards for his bride, believing only a "genuine" princess is good enough for her son. After the latest princess to ask for his hand fails the test set out for her, Dauntless mentions to Aggravain that he suspects that she is sabotaging his marriage prospects, which she falsely denies. Meanwhile, Lady Larken has discovered that she is pregnant and that she and Sir Harry, captain of the guard, need to find Dauntless a bride so that they themselves can get married and prevent Larken from being banished from the kingdom.

After several weeks of searching, Harry brings back Winnifred, a princess from the northern swamps who arrives at the castle after swimming the moat. Though Aggravain is disgusted by Winnifred, Dauntless falls instantly in love with her. Despite the queen's protestations, Dauntless convinces her to give Winnifred a chance, and the ladies of the court take Winnifred to get dry as Aggravain consults with the Wizard to pick a test. Deciding that the test should be on sensitivity, something Winnifred surely knows nothing about, they plan to test her that evening by placing a pea under twenty mattresses, claiming that a genuine princess could never sleep without feeling it.

As Winnifred is getting dressed, she is visited by the much nicer King Sextimus, the real ruler of the kingdom who is mute, and his Jester. The Jester explains that Sextimus was cursed by a witch and that it would only be reversed when "the mouse devours the hawk." Dauntless and the ladies of the court are then entertained by Winnifred's stories from living in a swamp. After a round of croquet, Aggravain tells Winnifred and Dauntless that they will be holding a ball later that evening to celebrate Winnifred's arrival. Secretly, Aggravain tells the Wizard that they will be dancing to the Spanish Panic, one of the most tiring dances ever, in order to exhaust Winnifred and ensure that she fails the test.

Larken meets up with Harry and expresses her worries that Winnifred is bound to fail, chastising Harry for not finding a better princess. She asks him to help Winnifred cheat, but as captain of the guard, he is conflicted, much to Larken's frustration. At the ball, Winnifred survives the dance and even suggests that everyone do it a second time, much to Aggravain's fury. Dauntless cheers up Winnifred by telling her that he loves her. He then expresses to the citizens in the kingdom how much he loves Winnifred and how different she is than all the other princesses he's met.

The Wizard and the Kingdom staff prepare for the evening by stacking twenty mattresses in Winnifred's chambers. Lady Larken stumbles across their plans as she attempts to sneak out of the castle, is discovered, and then is sent to the dungeon for the night to keep her from revealing the test. Meanwhile, Winnifred and Dauntless study academics for the test which they think will be the next day. He says goodnight and leaves her alone where she dreams of her happily ever after with him. Dauntless pays a visit to his father asking for a "man to man talk" about having children. Sextimus explains this as best he can through hand movements, with Dauntless resolving to marry Winnifred.

Walking the halls in the castle, Winnifred finds Larken and frees her from the cell, advising her to make up with Harry after their fight. Larken finds Harry and apologizes only to hear that Harry has decided to help Winnifred cheat, the two of them fantasizing about going to Normandy after they're married. At the same time, the Wizard gives Aggravain the smallest pea in the kingdom and they go to place it, gloating about Winnifred's imminent failure. Unbeknownst to them, Sextimus has been listening secretly to their conversation and proceeds to explain the plan to the Jester, Harry and Larken.

In her room, Aggravain dreams about ruling the kingdom for the rest of her life and goes to place the pea under the bottom mattress. Winnifred enters the tower where she is given opium to drink, and a 'nightingale from Samarkand' (but actually the Wizard in a costume) to sing a lullaby to help her sleep. While sleepy at first, upon climbing into bed she is kept awake by an unknown lump. She sends the Wizard out of the room and rips open the mattress to no avail. Exhausted from trying to find the source of the pain, she begins to count sheep.

The next morning, Aggravain informs Dauntless of the real test and how Winnifred is sure to have failed. However, Winnifred enters counting sheep in the thousands and reveals to the court that she never closed her eyes. Dauntless tells her that she passed but Aggravain quickly tries to come up with excuses to prevent him from marrying. Dauntless finally stands up to his mother and tells her to shut up, rendering her silent while Sextimus recovers his power of speech. The Jester realizes that the curse had been about Aggravain all along, and that Sextimus can now speak and rule once again. Larken and Harry embrace and go off to be wed but reveal to the court that Winnifred wasn't actually hurt by a pea as the Jester pulls various medieval weapons from between the mattresses. Dauntless brings Winnifred back to the tower to let her sleep again, but she still feels a slight pain, revealing that she could have felt the pea even if the others hadn't cheated. Dauntless removes the pea, and she sleeps soundly as he watches on, and they all lived happily ever after.

== Cast ==
- Carol Burnett as Queen Aggravain
- Denis O'Hare as Prince Dauntless
- Tracey Ullman as Princess Winnifred "Fred" of Ikonkill
- Tom Smothers as King Sextimus
- Matthew Morrison as Sir Harry
- Edward Hibbert as The Wizard
- Michael Boatman as The Jester
- Zooey Deschanel as Lady Larken
- Michelle Harrison as Princess #12
- Jennifer Copping as Lady Rowena
- Topaz Hasfal as Lady Merrill
- Cailin Stadnyk as Lady Lucille
- Shailene Woodley as Molly
- G. Michael Gray as Lookout

== Musical numbers ==
1. "Overture" - Orchestra
2. "Many Moons Ago" - Chorus
3. "A Princess is a Delicate Thing" - Aggravain
4. "In a Little While" - Larken and Harry
5. "Shy" - Winnifred, Dauntless, Aggravain, Knights
6. "Sensitivity" - Aggravain and Wizard
7. "The Swamps of Home" - Winnifred, Dauntless, Rowena, Merrill, Lucille
8. "Spanish Panic" - Orchestra and Dancers
9. "Song of Love" - Dauntless, Winnifred, Dancers
10. "Happily Ever After" - Winnifred
11. "Man to Man Talk" - Dauntless and Sextimus
12. "Normandy" - Larken and Harry
13. "Baby of Mine/Happily Ever After (Reprise)" - Aggravain
14. "Nightingale Lullaby" - Wizard
15. "Finale" - Dauntless, Winnifred, Jester, Harry, Larken, Rowena, Merrill, Lucille, Chorus
16. "End Credits" - Orchestra

== Production ==
The film features a score with music by Mary Rodgers and lyrics by Marshall Barer. The original song "My Baby and Me" was written by Ken and Mitzie Welch for the film. As well as directing, Marshall also choreographed the musical numbers. Bob Mackie designed Burnett's costumes while the rest of the film was costumed by Christopher Hargadon.

== Awards and nominations ==
The film received two Primetime Emmy Award Nominations for Outstanding Costumes for a Miniseries, Movie or a Special and Outstanding Original Music and Lyrics ("My Baby and Me" by Ken and Mitzie Welch). Brownell was nominated for an Online Film & Television Association award for Best Writing of a Motion Picture or Miniseries.

== Home media ==
It was released on DVD by Buena Vista Home Entertainment in 2006. In recent years, the film has also been released to several digital download and streaming outlets such as Amazon and iTunes. In 2019, the film was uploaded to Disney+.

== Critical reception ==
Metacritic, which uses a weighted average, assigned the film a score of 55 out of 100, based on 15 critics, indicating "mixed or average reviews".

MaryAnn Johanson wrote "The Princess and the Pea gets a kooky, musical, feminist spin that is just as fun and fresh today as it must have been when it made its Broadway debut in 1959." Tracey Petherick of Common Sense Media wrote "Disney reboot has fun playing on fairy tale stereotypes." UltimateDisney.com wrote "The movie offers a satisfactory presentation of a diverting play, which means that fans of musical comedies (and this one in particular) should enjoy it, but those who are not needn't go out of their way to see it."
