= Mark Pieloch =

American businessman

- Born: December 5, 1957 (age 68)
- Education: Massachusetts College of Pharmacy; University of Michigan
- Occupations: President and owner of PF Inc.

Mark Pieloch is the President and owner of PF Inc., formerly known as Pet Flavors.

== Education ==
Mark Pieloch attended Gardner High School in Gardner, Massachusetts. After high school, Pieloch earned a M.S. in Industrial Pharmacy from the Massachusetts College of Pharmacy, and went on to earn a Master of Business Administration from the Ross School of Business of the University of Michigan.

== Career ==
Pieloch has been a registered pharmacist in Massachusetts since 1979. He founded a variety of businesses in the field of pet pharmaceuticals, beginning with Pharma Chemie in Lincoln, Nebraska, in 1990.

He has since operated and/or sold PSPC, Phycox, Peak Nutrition, PalaTech Laboratories, and FlavorTek. He currently owns and operates Pet Flavors (now known as PF Inc.).

In 2016, Pieloch founded a tax-exempt 501(c)(3) organization, the American Muscle Car Museum in Melbourne, Florida, to house his personal automobile collection. With more than 400 cars belonging to Mr. Pieloch, the facility is not open to the public and primarily hosts charitable fundraising events.

== Patents ==
Pieloch is named as an inventor or co-inventor on two patents. These are US patents 6780437, issued for coated potassium chloride granules and tablets, and 7025965, issued for a method of use and dosage composition of blue-green algae extract for inflammation in animals.
