= 2012–13 NCAA Division III men's ice hockey season =

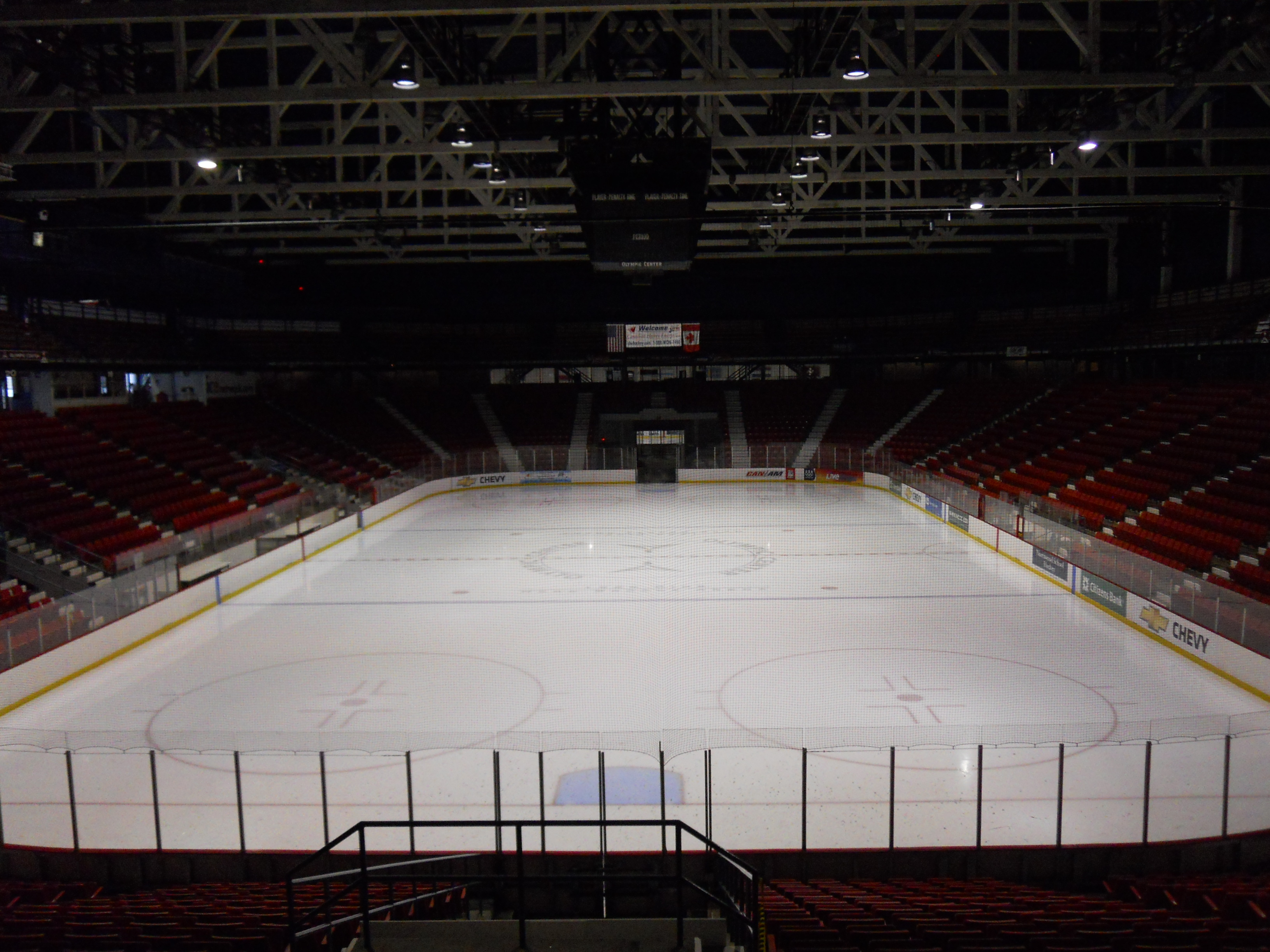
- Herb Brooks Arena was the host of the 2013 Frozen Four
- Duration: October 18, 2012– March 16, 2013
- NCAA tournament: 2013
- National championship: Herb Brooks Arena; Lake Placid, New York
- NCAA champion: Wisconsin–Eau Claire
- Sid Watson Award: Paul Rodrigues (Oswego State)

The 2012–13 NCAA Division III men's ice hockey season began on October 18, 2012, and concluded on March 16, 2013. This was the 40th season of Division III college ice hockey.

== Regular season ==
=== Standings ===
2012–13 ECAC East standings
	Conference							Overall					
	GP	W	L	T	PTS	GF	GA	GP	W	L	T	GF	GA
Division III
Norwich †	18	16	1	1	33	79	28	29	24	4	1	116	50
Massachusetts–Boston	18	11	5	2	24	78	60	27	19	6	2	126	86
Babson *	18	10	5	3	23	62	43	30	18	7	5	100	67
Castleton State	18	9	8	1	19	62	53	27	15	10	2	90	74
New England College	18	7	8	3	17	47	51	26	9	13	4	67	82
Skidmore	18	8	9	1	17	66	67	26	11	13	2	89	104
University of New England	18	4	13	1	9	47	88	25	6	17	0	67	113
Southern Maine	18	4	14	0	8	46	76	26	7	19	0	71	111
Division II
Saint Anselm	18	9	7	2	20	63	53	27	16	8	3	107	73
Saint Michael's	18	5	13	0	10	42	73	25	8	17	0	66	94
Championship: March 2, 2013 † indicates conference regular season champion * indicates conference tournament champion

2012–13 ECAC Northeast standings
	Conference							Overall					
	GP	W	L	T	PTS	GF	GA	GP	W	L	T	GF	GA
Wentworth †*	14	10	2	2	22	56	30	28	16	9	3	86	64
Nichols	14	9	4	1	19	41	31	26	16	9	1	82	64
Curry	14	7	3	4	18	45	38	26	11	11	4	71	80
Western New England	14	8	6	0	16	44	43	26	11	15	0	86	95
Salve Regina	14	5	7	2	12	53	48	27	10	14	3	98	107
Johnson & Wales	14	5	8	1	11	48	62	27	10	16	1	95	115
Suffolk	14	3	7	4	10	40	49	25	6	13	6	72	97
Becker	14	1	11	2	4	45	71	25	10	13	2	91	99
Championship: March 3, 2013 † indicates conference regular season champion * indicates conference tournament champions

2012–13 ECAC West standings
	Conference							Overall					
	GP	W	L	T	PTS	GF	GA	GP	W	L	T	GF	GA
Utica †	15	11	3	1	23	69	37	28	21	6	1	122	64
Hobart †	15	11	3	1	23	55	32	26	19	5	2	100	48
Neumann *	15	8	6	1	17	45	36	28	19	6	3	94	58
Manhattanville	15	6	6	3	15	52	48	28	15	10	3	104	74
Elmira	15	5	10	0	10	50	74	26	10	16	0	88	128
Nazareth	15	1	14	0	2	32	76	26	6	19	1	69	110
Championship: March 2, 2013 † indicates conference regular season champion * indicates conference tournament champions

2012–13 NCAA Division III Independent ice hockey standings
	Overall record					
	GP	W	L	T	GF	GA
Canton State	15	4	11	0	31	57

2012–13 Massachusetts State Collegiate Athletic Conference ice hockey standings
	Conference							Overall					
	GP	W	L	T	PTS	GF	GA	GP	W	L	T	GF	GA
Plymouth State †	18	14	3	1	29	67	38	27	19	7	1	97	59
Massachusetts–Dartmouth *	18	9	3	6	24	54	44	27	12	8	7	80	78
Salem State	18	10	7	1	21	60	57	27	14	12	1	89	85
Westfield State	18	9	6	3	21	72	54	26	14	9	3	102	82
Fitchburg State	18	9	8	1	19	68	54	27	11	14	2	95	90
Worcester State	18	3	12	3	9	44	65	26	6	17	3	59	93
Framingham State	18	0	15	3	3	45	98	24	2	19	3	70	127
Championship: March 2, 2013 † indicates conference regular season champion * indicates conference tournament champions

2012–13 Midwest Collegiate Hockey Association standings
	Conference							Overall					
	GP	W	L	T	PTS	GF	GA	GP	W	L	T	GF	GA
North Division
Marian	20	12	8	0	24	57	52	26	13	12	1	66	65
Lawrence	20	6	11	3	15	68	65	27	8	16	3	85	97
Northland	20	7	13	0	14	67	107	28	10	17	1	89	141
Finlandia	20	7	13	0	14	55	77	25	7	18	0	60	96
South Division
Adrian †*	20	17	0	3	37	99	41	28	23	2	3	137	62
MSOE	20	12	6	2	26	69	48	29	17	10	2	88	65
Lake Forest	20	6	10	4	16	52	58	27	10	12	5	70	72
Concordia (WI)	20	7	13	0	14	55	77	25	7	18	0	68	109
Championship: March 2, 2013 † indicates conference regular season champion * indicates conference tournament champions

2012–13 Minnesota Intercollegiate Athletic Conference ice hockey standings
	Conference							Overall					
	GP	W	L	T	PTS	GF	GA	GP	W	L	T	GF	GA
St. Thomas †	16	10	5	1	21	47	25	26	13	11	2	66	47
Saint John's †*	16	9	4	3	21	47	27	28	16	8	4	86	58
Concordia (MN)	16	10	6	0	20	49	39	26	13	12	1	79	60
Gustavus Adolphus	16	9	5	2	20	49	36	28	17	8	3	79	60
St. Olaf	16	9	7	0	18	47	41	26	10	14	2	63	73
Augsburg	16	6	8	2	14	40	44	25	8	14	3	64	76
Saint Mary's	16	6	9	1	13	48	56	25	8	16	1	70	101
Bethel	16	6	10	0	12	39	61	25	7	18	0	58	97
Hamline	16	1	12	3	5	27	64	25	1	19	5	45	99
Championship: March 2, 2013 † indicates conference regular season champion * indicates conference tournament champion

2012–13 New England Small College Athletic Conference ice hockey standings
	Conference							Overall					
	GP	W	L	T	PTS	GF	GA	GP	W	L	T	GF	GA
Bowdoin †*	18	13	3	2	28	76	47	29	23	4	2	123	74
Williams	18	12	4	2	26	54	35	27	17	7	3	81	54
Trinity	18	11	4	3	25	61	37	25	15	7	3	83	56
Amherst	18	11	5	2	24	56	38	25	15	7	3	82	52
Middlebury	18	11	5	2	24	70	53	26	13	11	2	88	82
Wesleyan	18	6	8	4	16	56	49	25	10	11	4	88	69
Colby	18	5	11	2	12	47	69	25	7	15	3	67	88
Hamilton	18	4	12	2	10	42	64	25	6	16	3	56	93
Connecticut College	18	3	12	3	9	38	68	24	7	14	3	56	86
Tufts	18	2	14	2	6	46	86	24	7	15	2	67	100
Championship: March 3, 2013 † indicates conference regular season champion * indicates conference tournament champion

2012–13 Northern Collegiate Hockey Association standings
	Conference							Overall					
	GP	W	L	T	PTS	GF	GA	GP	W	L	T	GF	GA
Wisconsin–Eau Claire †	18	14	3	1	29	67	38	31	24	5	2	125	68
St. Norbert *	18	13	4	1	27	72	31	30	23	6	1	119	52
Wisconsin–Stevens Point	18	8	9	1	17	59	57	27	15	11	1	93	76
St. Scholastica	18	7	10	1	15	62	70	28	13	14	1	95	92
Wisconsin–Superior	18	6	10	2	14	39	59	27	11	14	2	68	85
Wisconsin–River Falls	18	5	9	4	14	39	59	28	13	11	4	79	82
Wisconsin–Stout	18	5	13	0	10	43	67	27	10	15	2	74	89
Championship: March 2, 2013 † indicates conference regular season champion * indicates conference tournament champion

2012–13 State University of New York Athletic Conference ice hockey standings
	Conference							Overall					
	GP	W	L	T	PTS	GF	GA	GP	W	L	T	GF	GA
Oswego State †*	16	14	2	0	28	80	27	30	25	5	0	145	57
Plattsburgh State	16	13	2	1	27	62	25	27	19	7	1	99	49
Geneseo State	16	11	4	1	23	64	43	27	17	9	1	102	70
Buffalo State	16	7	8	1	15	50	48	27	13	12	2	85	71
Fredonia State	16	5	9	2	12	30	57	26	7	16	3	46	100
Potsdam State	16	6	10	0	12	45	68	26	9	16	1	78	111
Brockport State	16	5	10	1	11	36	46	25	7	16	2	63	83
Cortland State	16	3	11	2	8	45	73	25	7	15	3	77	99
Morrisville State	16	3	11	2	8	42	67	25	4	19	2	64	112
Championship: March 2, 2013 † indicates conference regular season champion * indicates conference tournament champions

Note: Mini-game are not included in final standings

== Player stats ==
=== Scoring leaders ===
GP = Games played; G = Goals; A = Assists; Pts = Points; PIM = Penalty minutes

Player	Class	Team	GP	G	A	Pts	PIM
Joe Caveney	Junior	Fitchburg State	27	17	30	47	26
Paul Rodrigues	Senior	Oswego State	30	16	30	46	26
Luke Moodie	Senior	Oswego State	30	22	22	44	16
Kyle Stroh	Senior	St. Norbert	29	19	22	41	24
Zach Parkhouse	Senior	Becker	25	23	17	40	14
Keith Buehler	Junior	Wesleyan	25	20	20	40	30
Travis Daniel	Junior	Massachusetts–Boston	26	12	28	40	30
Matt Graham	Senior	Becker	25	18	21	39	10
Zach Graham	Senior	Adrian	28	14	25	39	22
Shaquille Merasty	Freshman	Adrian	28	22	16	38	10
Colin Mulvey	Senior	Norwich	29	19	19	38	6
Travis Janke	Junior	Norwich	29	15	23	38	8
Chris Muise	Senior	Oswego State	29	13	25	38	37
Josh Cousineau	Junior	Adrian	29	12	26	38	28

=== Leading goaltenders ===
GP = Games played; Min = Minutes played; W = Wins; L = Losses; T = Ties; GA = Goals against; SO = Shutouts; SV% = Save percentage; GAA = Goals against average

Player	Class	Team	GP	Min	W	L	T	GA	SO	SV%	GAA
David Jacobson	Sophomore	St. Norbert	28	1597	20	6	1	43	6	.931	1.61
Nick Broadwater	Senior	Hobart	22	1304	15	5	2	36	4	.939	1.66
Chris Czarnota	Junior	Norwich	16	922	13	2	1	26	3	.912	1.69
Drew Fielding	Sophomore	St. Thomas	21	1208	10	8	2	34	5	.929	1.69
Mathieu Cadieux	Junior	Plattsburgh State	24	1384	15	7	1	41	2	.929	1.78
Saxton Soley	Freshman	Saint John's	22	1290	15	5	1	39	2	.928	1.81
Zeke Testa	Senior	Babson	17	1035	10	3	1	32	1	.936	1.85
Braely Torris	Junior	Neumann	21	1197	13	4	2	37	4	.942	1.85
Andrew Hare	Senior	Oswego State	27	1503	21	5	0	47	6	.930	1.88
Scott Shackell	Sophomore	Adrian	17	859	11	2	1	28	1	.933	1.95

== 2013 NCAA Tournament ==
First Round; March 6
E5	Babson	6
E6	Wentworth	1
W3	Wisconsin–Eau Claire	4
W4	Saint John's	2
E4	Bowdoin	5
E7	Massachusetts–Dartmouth	2

Quarterfinals; March 9
E1	Norwich (2)	4
E5	Babson	0
W2	Adrian (3)	2
E3	Oswego State	3*
W1	St. Norbert (1)	1
W3	Wisconsin–Eau Claire	3
E2	Utica (4)	4
E4	Bowdoin	2

Semifinals; March 15
E1	Norwich (2)	3
E3	Oswego State	6
W3	Wisconsin–Eau Claire	5
E2	Utica (4)	1

National Championship; March 16
E3	Oswego State	3
W3	Wisconsin–Eau Claire	5

Note: * denotes overtime period(s)

== See also ==
- 2012–13 NCAA Division I men's ice hockey season
- 2012–13 NCAA Division II men's ice hockey season
