= Leonard L. Amburgey =

American amateur astronomer

Minor planets discovered: 2
(10206) 1997 PC_{2}	August 7, 1997	MPC
(215188) 2000 NM	July 2, 2000	MPC

Leonard L. Amburgey (born 1945) is an American amateur astronomer, discoverer of minor planets and public-school teacher by profession.

On July 2, 2000, he stumbled upon the near-Earth and Apollo asteroid (215188) 2000 NM using a modest telescope in his backyard in Fitchburg, Massachusetts (IAU number 823). As a result, he became the fourth winner of the James Benson Prize for Discovery Methods of Near-Earth Objects by Amateurs.

In 2005, he received the Fitchburg State College (whence he graduated in 1968 and 1973) Alumni Achievement Award.
