= American Muscle Car Museum =

Non-profit museum in Melbourne, Florida

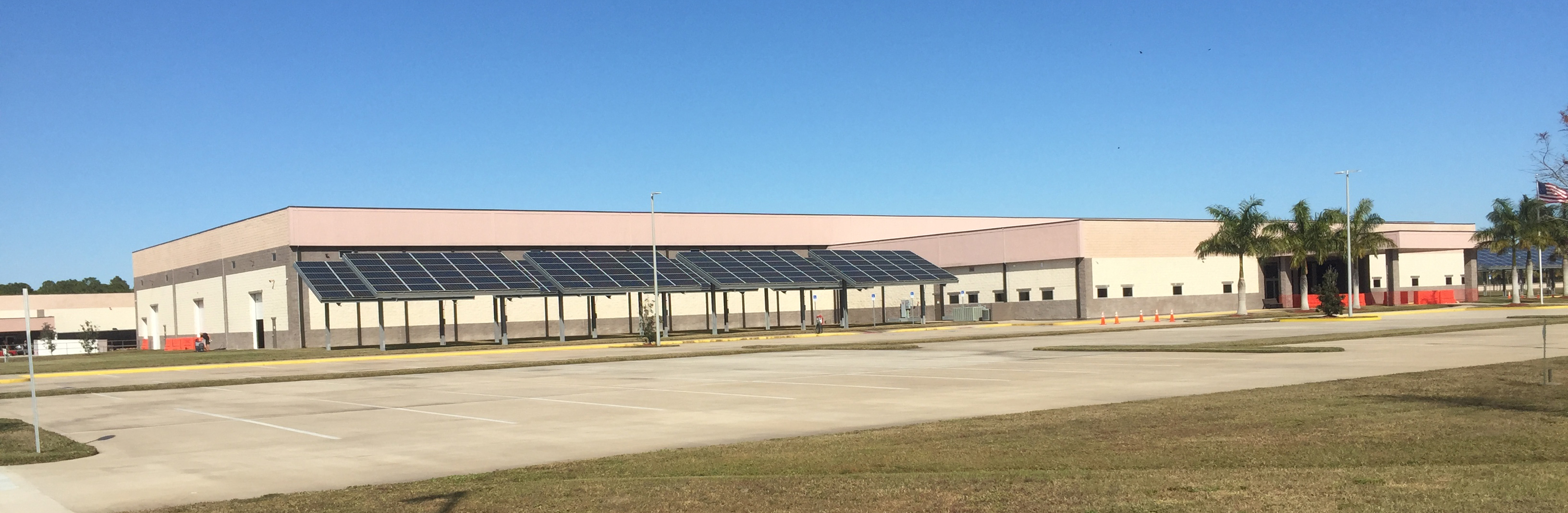

- Location within Florida
- Established: 2016
- Location: 3500 Sarno Road; Melbourne, Florida
- Coordinates: 28.1209°N 80.6897°W
- Type: Automobile
- Key holdings: Muscle cars
- Collection size: 250 vehicles
- Founder: Mark Pieloch
- Website: American Muscle Car Museum

The American Muscle Car Museum is a private, tax exempt 501(c)(3) organization located in Melbourne, Florida — operating as a museum accommodating the personal car collection of Mark Pieloch.

The facility, which is not open to the public, focuses on education and the preservation of cars, and as an event venue for educational tours and charity fundraisers, e.g., hosting events for Brevard County non-profits.

The 123,000 sq-ft facility houses over 420 muscle cars, many considered rare versions with very low mileage. The cars have an estimated worth of $32 million. Pieloch has collected cars since 1974 and the models in the museum start from 1955, with many from the 1969-70 period.

The facility includes a conservation area to restore cars, and is a "green building" deriving 100% of its electrical requirements from solar energy with 1,200 panels.

In addition to automobiles, the collection includes vintage balloon tire bicycles, automotive-related neon signs, antique gas pumps, jukeboxes, pedal cars, vintage coolers, and motorcycles.
