= Ethan F. Becker =

American American writer and speech coach

- Education: Fitchburg State University; Capella University
- Occupation: Speech coach
- Notable work: Mastering Communication at Work: How to Lead, Manage and Influence
- Title: President of The Speech Improvement Company
- Website: www.speechimprovement.com

Ethan F. Becker is an author, executive, and speech coach.

== Early life ==
Becker graduated from Fitchburg State University in 1993 from a degree in mass communication, before beginning a career in marketing. While working as the marketing director at Media 100, he created a prototype video streaming service in the late-1990s during a partnership with Canon, a service that was sold to Autodesk.

== Speaking career ==
Following a job loss during the 2001 economic downturn, he joined his mother and father’s company the Speech Improvement Company, while completing his MBA from Capella University. Becker increased the company’s clients base, adding corporations, politicians, and other leaders as clients. As a communications consultant he has worked for organizations including Apple Computer and the New York Giants.

Becker is now president and senior coaching partner of the Speech Improvement Company. In addition to speech coaching, he has co-developed a virtual reality component of the company that has clients do public speaking before a virtual audience for practice. In the media, he has also discussed the rise of social media and the importance of monitoring what one’s online image communicates to others. Becker has served as an instructor at the Harvard Graduate School of Design Executive Education program. He has also been a guest lecturer at Boston College, Boston University, Wentworth Institute of Technology, Babson, and Johns Hopkins University.

== Writing ==
Becker is the coauthor of Mastering Communication at Work: How to Lead, Manage and Influence with Jon Wortmann, in which he shares advice for people in the business world. Jason Jacobsohn wrote of the book that, "By sprinkling case studies throughout the book, the reader has a real world understanding of the impact of a particular technique." His advice includes the development of a common understanding of what different people in a company mean by main concepts, and ensuring common cross-cultural understandings.

The second edition of Mastering Communication at Work: How to Lead, Manage, and Influence was published on February 9, 2021. A detailed review by Robert Morris, who is a hall of fame top 1000 reviewer said "I urge you to read and then re-read their book" can be found on the Amazon review site for the book.

== Personal life ==
Ethan Becker was born to Dennis and Paula Borkum Becker, the founders of the Speech Improvement Company, and is married to his wife Kelly Durkin Becker. He and his wife have three children.
