= 2010–11 NCAA Division III men's ice hockey season =

American men's collegiate hockey season

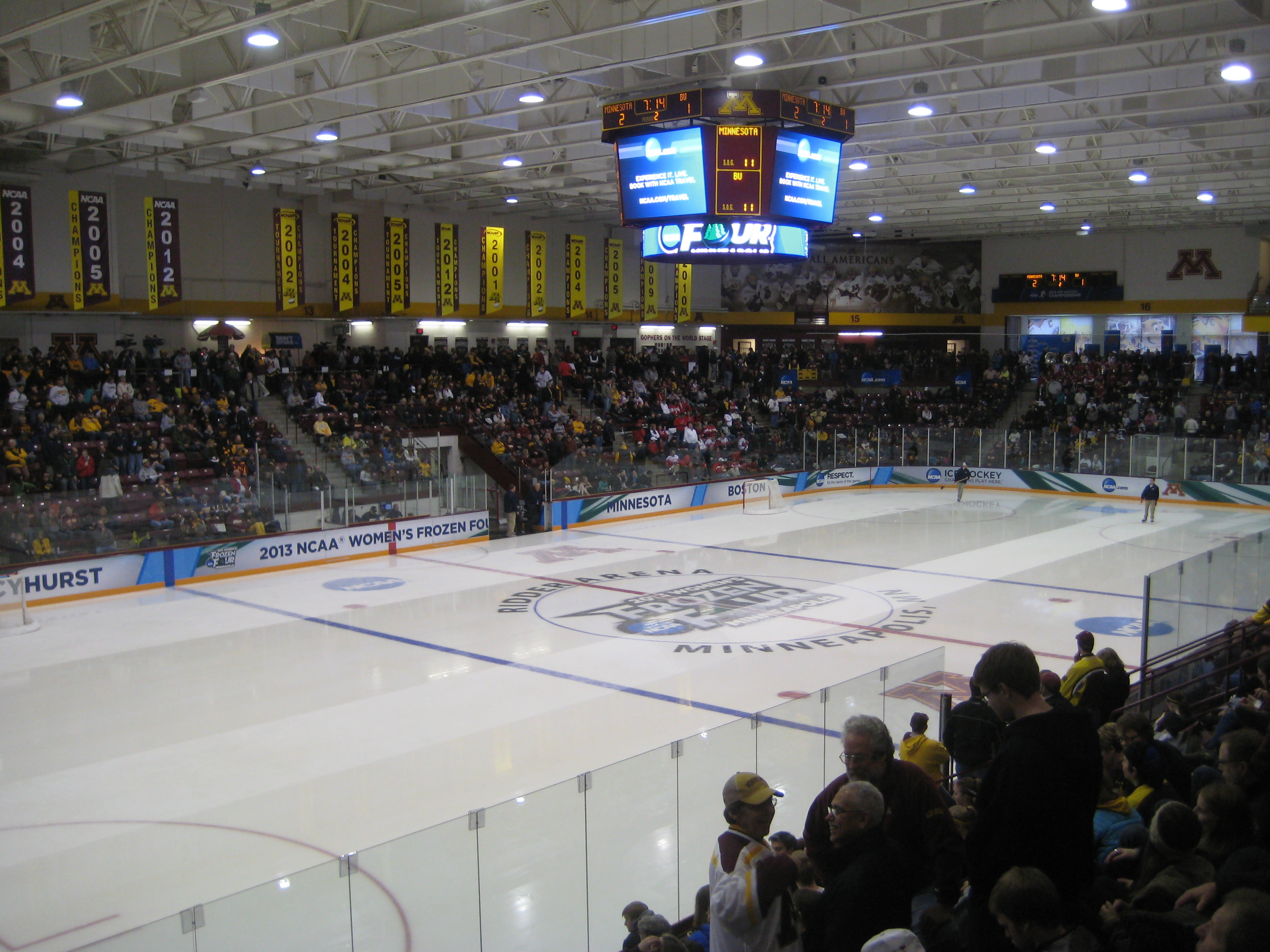
- The Ridder Arena was the host of the 2011 Frozen Four
- Duration: October 22, 2010– March 26, 2011
- NCAA tournament: 2011
- National championship: Ridder Arena; Minneapolis, Minnesota
- NCAA champion: St. Norbert
- Sid Watson Award: Chris Berenguer (Hamline)

The 2010–11 NCAA Division III men's ice hockey season began on October 22, 2010, and concluded on March 26, 2011. This was the 38th season of Division III college ice hockey.

== Regular season ==
=== Standings ===
2010–11 ECAC East standings
| | Conference | | | | | | | Overall | | | | | |
| | GP | W | L | T | PTS | GF | GA | GP | W | L | T | GF | GA |
Division III
| Norwich †* | 19 | 15 | 1 | 3 | 33 | 90 | 37 | 31 | 22 | 6 | 3 | 132 | 67 |
| Castleton State | 19 | 15 | 3 | 1 | 31 | 80 | 48 | 27 | 22 | 4 | 1 | 123 | 61 |
| Massachusetts–Boston | 19 | 10 | 9 | 0 | 20 | 65 | 57 | 26 | 15 | 11 | 0 | 99 | 74 |
| Skidmore | 19 | 8 | 8 | 3 | 19 | 60 | 55 | 26 | 9 | 14 | 3 | 73 | 84 |
| Babson | 19 | 7 | 9 | 3 | 17 | 65 | 65 | 28 | 11 | 14 | 3 | 87 | 93 |
| Southern Maine | 19 | 5 | 11 | 3 | 13 | 46 | 70 | 26 | 8 | 13 | 5 | 64 | 88 |
| New England College | 19 | 5 | 13 | 1 | 11 | 47 | 70 | 26 | 7 | 17 | 2 | 71 | 95 |
| University of New England | 19 | 3 | 16 | 0 | 6 | 43 | 115 | 25 | 6 | 19 | 0 | 70 | 145 |
Division II
| Saint Anselm | 19 | 7 | 10 | 2 | 16 | 65 | 68 | 26 | 13 | 11 | 2 | 106 | 88 |
| Saint Michael's | 19 | 6 | 12 | 1 | 13 | 46 | 70 | 27 | 11 | 15 | 1 | 96 | 113 |
Championship: March 5, 2011 † indicates conference regular season champion * indicates conference tournament champion

2010–11 ECAC Northeast standings
| | Conference | | | | | | | Overall | | | | | |
| | GP | W | L | T | PTS | GF | GA | GP | W | L | T | GF | GA |
|---|---|---|---|---|---|---|---|---|---|---|---|---|---|
| Curry †* | 14 | 10 | 2 | 2 | 22 | 67 | 40 | 28 | 16 | 9 | 3 | 109 | 90 |
| Wentworth | 14 | 10 | 3 | 1 | 21 | 65 | 33 | 27 | 14 | 9 | 4 | 106 | 75 |
| Johnson & Wales | 14 | 10 | 4 | 0 | 20 | 63 | 46 | 27 | 14 | 12 | 1 | 107 | 93 |
| Becker | 14 | 7 | 4 | 3 | 17 | 49 | 47 | 27 | 11 | 13 | 3 | 94 | 103 |
| Nichols | 14 | 6 | 8 | 0 | 12 | 52 | 52 | 26 | 12 | 13 | 1 | 101 | 95 |
| Western New England | 14 | 5 | 9 | 0 | 10 | 49 | 73 | 26 | 8 | 17 | 1 | 96 | 140 |
| Suffolk | 14 | 4 | 10 | 0 | 8 | 36 | 51 | 24 | 8 | 16 | 0 | 61 | 85 |
| Salve Regina | 14 | 1 | 13 | 0 | 2 | 52 | 91 | 25 | 2 | 21 | 2 | 71 | 161 |
Championship: March 5, 2011 † indicates conference regular season champion * indicates conference tournament champions

2010–11 ECAC West standings
| | Conference | | | | | | | Overall | | | | | |
| | GP | W | L | T | PTS | GF | GA | GP | W | L | T | GF | GA |
|---|---|---|---|---|---|---|---|---|---|---|---|---|---|
| Elmira †* | 12 | 8 | 3 | 1 | 17 | 41 | 22 | 28 | 17 | 7 | 4 | 108 | 70 |
| Neumann | 12 | 7 | 4 | 1 | 15 | 37 | 33 | 28 | 14 | 9 | 5 | 86 | 73 |
| Utica | 12 | 6 | 5 | 1 | 13 | 32 | 36 | 26 | 17 | 8 | 1 | 96 | 59 |
| Hobart | 12 | 4 | 7 | 1 | 9 | 33 | 39 | 27 | 15 | 10 | 2 | 91 | 71 |
| Manhattanville | 12 | 3 | 9 | 0 | 6 | 25 | 38 | 26 | 15 | 10 | 1 | 90 | 68 |
Championship: March 5, 2011 † indicates conference regular season champion * indicates conference tournament champions

2010–11 Massachusetts State Collegiate Athletic Conference ice hockey standings
| | Conference | | | | | | | Overall | | | | | |
| | GP | W | L | T | PTS | GF | GA | GP | W | L | T | GF | GA |
|---|---|---|---|---|---|---|---|---|---|---|---|---|---|
| Massachusetts–Dartmouth † | 18 | 13 | 4 | 1 | 27 | 60 | 40 | 26 | 18 | 7 | 1 | 89 | 62 |
| Salem State | 18 | 11 | 5 | 2 | 24 | 78 | 42 | 27 | 18 | 7 | 2 | 116 | 69 |
| Plymouth State | 18 | 10 | 5 | 3 | 23 | 61 | 44 | 26 | 15 | 6 | 5 | 97 | 61 |
| Fitchburg State * | 18 | 9 | 8 | 1 | 19 | 61 | 49 | 28 | 18 | 9 | 1 | 114 | 78 |
| Worcester State | 18 | 7 | 10 | 1 | 15 | 45 | 62 | 26 | 11 | 12 | 3 | 74 | 85 |
| Westfield State | 18 | 4 | 13 | 1 | 9 | 59 | 79 | 27 | 6 | 19 | 2 | 85 | 111 |
| Framingham State | 18 | 4 | 13 | 1 | 9 | 44 | 92 | 23 | 4 | 18 | 1 | 55 | 113 |
Championship: March 5, 2011 † indicates conference regular season champion * indicates conference tournament champions

2010–11 Midwest Collegiate Hockey Association standings
| | Conference | | | | | | | Overall | | | | | |
| | GP | W | L | T | PTS | GF | GA | GP | W | L | T | GF | GA |
North Division
| Marian | 20 | 15 | 5 | 0 | 30 | 90 | 44 | 27 | 19 | 8 | 0 | 118 | 68 |
| Lawrence | 20 | 10 | 10 | 0 | 20 | 63 | 70 | 28 | 14 | 13 | 1 | 82 | 99 |
| Northland | 20 | 8 | 10 | 2 | 18 | 65 | 77 | 27 | 9 | 16 | 2 | 84 | 117 |
| Finlandia | 20 | 3 | 17 | 0 | 6 | 46 | 94 | 24 | 3 | 21 | 0 | 52 | 112 |
South Division
| Adrian †* | 20 | 18 | 1 | 1 | 37 | 99 | 36 | 30 | 25 | 4 | 1 | 149 | 67 |
| MSOE | 20 | 16 | 3 | 1 | 33 | 77 | 35 | 28 | 21 | 6 | 1 | 107 | 59 |
| Lake Forest | 20 | 5 | 14 | 1 | 11 | 56 | 78 | 27 | 5 | 21 | 1 | 62 | 107 |
| Concordia (WI) | 20 | 2 | 17 | 1 | 5 | 38 | 100 | 25 | 2 | 22 | 1 | 43 | 127 |
Championship: March 6, 2011 † indicates conference regular season champion * indicates conference tournament champions

2010–11 Minnesota Intercollegiate Athletic Conference ice hockey standings
| | Conference | | | | | | | Overall | | | | | |
| | GP | W | L | T | Pts | GF | GA | GP | W | L | T | GF | GA |
|---|---|---|---|---|---|---|---|---|---|---|---|---|---|
| Hamline †* | 16 | 9 | 3 | 4 | 22 | 58 | 43 | 29 | 17 | 7 | 5 | 94 | 74 |
| St. Thomas | 16 | 9 | 5 | 2 | 20 | 50 | 34 | 26 | 14 | 10 | 2 | 84 | 66 |
| Concordia (MN) | 16 | 7 | 5 | 4 | 18 | 45 | 40 | 27 | 12 | 11 | 4 | 83 | 82 |
| Gustavus Adolphus | 16 | 8 | 6 | 2 | 18 | 49 | 47 | 27 | 15 | 10 | 2 | 79 | 74 |
| Augsburg | 16 | 8 | 6 | 2 | 18 | 50 | 48 | 26 | 14 | 9 | 3 | 86 | 69 |
| St. Olaf | 16 | 5 | 7 | 4 | 14 | 42 | 44 | 25 | 11 | 10 | 4 | 71 | 63 |
| Saint John's | 16 | 5 | 9 | 2 | 12 | 40 | 47 | 25 | 6 | 17 | 2 | 57 | 81 |
| Saint Mary's | 16 | 5 | 9 | 2 | 12 | 49 | 58 | 25 | 6 | 17 | 2 | 65 | 95 |
| Bethel | 16 | 3 | 9 | 4 | 10 | 50 | 72 | 25 | 4 | 17 | 4 | 79 | 109 |
Championship: March 5, 2011 † indicates conference regular season champion * indicates conference tournament champion

2010–11 New England Small College Athletic Conference ice hockey standings
| | Conference | | | | | | | Overall | | | | | |
| | GP | W | L | T | PTS | GF | GA | GP | W | L | T | GF | GA |
|---|---|---|---|---|---|---|---|---|---|---|---|---|---|
| Hamilton † | 19 | 11 | 4 | 4 | 26 | 72 | 57 | 25 | 14 | 7 | 4 | 93 | 73 |
| Williams | 19 | 11 | 6 | 2 | 24 | 70 | 46 | 27 | 16 | 8 | 3 | 95 | 67 |
| Middlebury | 19 | 9 | 5 | 5 | 23 | 65 | 48 | 25 | 11 | 8 | 6 | 78 | 62 |
| Amherst | 19 | 10 | 6 | 3 | 23 | 62 | 48 | 25 | 12 | 9 | 4 | 79 | 64 |
| Bowdoin * | 19 | 11 | 7 | 1 | 23 | 78 | 60 | 28 | 19 | 8 | 1 | 121 | 85 |
| Colby | 19 | 10 | 7 | 2 | 22 | 70 | 56 | 25 | 12 | 11 | 2 | 85 | 75 |
| Trinity | 19 | 9 | 8 | 2 | 20 | 51 | 46 | 25 | 11 | 10 | 4 | 66 | 61 |
| Wesleyan | 19 | 8 | 10 | 1 | 17 | 67 | 60 | 25 | 10 | 12 | 3 | 82 | 73 |
| Connecticut College | 19 | 6 | 12 | 1 | 13 | 48 | 71 | 24 | 7 | 14 | 3 | 66 | 82 |
| Tufts | 19 | 5 | 14 | 0 | 19 | 52 | 93 | 23 | 6 | 16 | 1 | 66 | 106 |
Championship: March 6, 2011 † indicates conference regular season champion * indicates conference tournament champion

2010–11 Northern Collegiate Hockey Association standings
| | Conference | | | | | | | Overall | | | | | |
| | GP | W | L | T | Pts | GF | GA | GP | W | L | T | GF | GA |
|---|---|---|---|---|---|---|---|---|---|---|---|---|---|
| St. Norbert †* | 18 | 14 | 3 | 1 | 29 | 57 | 36 | 30 | 25 | 4 | 1 | 103 | 54 |
| Wisconsin–Superior | 18 | 10 | 8 | 0 | 20 | 57 | 45 | 30 | 16 | 13 | 1 | 92 | 75 |
| Wisconsin–Stout | 18 | 10 | 8 | 0 | 20 | 61 | 62 | 27 | 16 | 11 | 0 | 95 | 85 |
| Wisconsin–Stevens Point | 18 | 8 | 9 | 1 | 17 | 52 | 47 | 28 | 13 | 14 | 1 | 82 | 77 |
| Wisconsin–Eau Claire | 18 | 8 | 9 | 1 | 17 | 53 | 53 | 27 | 15 | 11 | 1 | 83 | 71 |
| Wisconsin–River Falls | 18 | 7 | 10 | 1 | 15 | 45 | 49 | 28 | 12 | 14 | 2 | 76 | 70 |
| St. Scholastica | 18 | 4 | 14 | 0 | 8 | 40 | 73 | 27 | 9 | 17 | 1 | 72 | 102 |
Championship: March 5, 2011 † indicates conference regular season champion * indicates conference tournament champion

2010–11 State University of New York Athletic Conference ice hockey standings
| | Conference | | | | | | | Overall | | | | | |
| | GP | W | L | T | PTS | GF | GA | GP | W | L | T | GF | GA |
|---|---|---|---|---|---|---|---|---|---|---|---|---|---|
| Oswego State † | 16 | 15 | 1 | 0 | 30 | 79 | 30 | 28 | 23 | 5 | 0 | 117 | 58 |
| Geneseo State | 16 | 10 | 5 | 1 | 21 | 52 | 42 | 26 | 16 | 8 | 2 | 94 | 64 |
| Buffalo State | 16 | 8 | 5 | 3 | 19 | 50 | 43 | 26 | 12 | 11 | 3 | 81 | 69 |
| Plattsburgh State * | 16 | 9 | 7 | 0 | 18 | 64 | 49 | 29 | 20 | 8 | 1 | 116 | 75 |
| Morrisville State | 16 | 8 | 7 | 1 | 17 | 59 | 56 | 25 | 11 | 13 | 1 | 86 | 97 |
| Fredonia State | 16 | 7 | 8 | 1 | 15 | 55 | 44 | 28 | 14 | 13 | 1 | 100 | 83 |
| Cortland State | 16 | 5 | 10 | 1 | 11 | 47 | 71 | 25 | 6 | 17 | 2 | 64 | 114 |
| Potsdam State | 16 | 4 | 12 | 0 | 8 | 49 | 80 | 24 | 6 | 17 | 1 | 72 | 116 |
| Brockport State | 16 | 2 | 13 | 1 | 5 | 40 | 80 | 25 | 4 | 18 | 3 | 73 | 120 |
Championship: March 5, 2011 † indicates conference regular season champion * indicates conference tournament champions

Note: Mini-game are not included in final standings

== Player stats ==
=== Scoring leaders ===
GP = Games played; G = Goals; A = Assists; Pts = Points; PIM = Penalty minutes

| Player | Class | Team | GP | G | A | Pts | PIM |
|---|---|---|---|---|---|---|---|
| Jeremiah Ketts | Junior | Johnson & Wales | 27 | 25 | 25 | 50 | 54 |
| Josh Harris | Sophomore | Castleton | 27 | 16 | 34 | 50 | 49 |
| Dakota Dubetz | Sophomore | Marian | 27 | 15 | 34 | 49 | 18 |
| Shawn Skelly | Senior | Adrian | 29 | 21 | 27 | 48 | 32 |
| Eric Miller | Senior | Adrian | 28 | 19 | 28 | 47 | 40 |
| Bryan Ross | Junior | Fredonia State | 28 | 15 | 31 | 46 | 10 |
| Daniel Weiniger | Sophomore | Bowdoin | 28 | 20 | 25 | 45 | 8 |
| Stuart Stefan | Senior | Castleton | 25 | 19 | 26 | 45 | 18 |
| Brendan Hull | Senior | Marian | 27 | 22 | 21 | 43 | 77 |
| Dennis Zak | Senior | Westfield State | 27 | 18 | 24 | 42 | 14 |

=== Leading goaltenders ===
GP = Games played; Min = Minutes played; W = Wins; L = Losses; T = Ties; GA = Goals against; SO = Shutouts; SV% = Save percentage; GAA = Goals against average

| Player | Class | Team | GP | Min | W | L | T | GA | SO | SV% | GAA |
|---|---|---|---|---|---|---|---|---|---|---|---|
| B.J. O'Brien | Senior | St. Norbert | 25 | 1473 | 22 | 2 | 1 | 40 | 4 | .931 | 1.63 |
| Parker Carroll | Freshman | Norwich | 19 | 1087 | 14 | 1 | 2 | 30 | 0 | .899 | 1.82 |
| Nick BonDurant | Freshman | Middlebury | 10 | 486 | 3 | 4 | 1 | 15 | 0 | .919 | 1.85 |
| Tyrone Simcoe | Sophomore | St. Thomas | 13 | 682 | 5 | 4 | 2 | 22 | 2 | .926 | 1.93 |
| Erick Cinotti | Freshman | Castleton | 16 | 931 | 12 | 2 | 1 | 31 | 2 | .919 | 2.00 |
| Connor Toomey | Junior | MSOE | 25 | 1464 | 18 | 6 | 1 | 49 | 4 | .922 | 2.01 |
| Paul Beckwith | Junior | Oswego State | 22 | 1334 | 19 | 3 | 0 | 45 | 2 | .926 | 2.02 |
| Evan Smith | Sophomore | Utica | 16 | 813 | 9 | 4 | 1 | 29 | 0 | .920 | 2.14 |
| Alex Bjerk | Sophomore | Marian | 16 | 834 | 11 | 4 | 0 | 30 | 1 | .915 | 2.16 |
| Darren MacDonald | Sophomore | Elmira | 24 | 1419 | 16 | 3 | 4 | 51 | 3 | .930 | 2.16 |

== 2011 NCAA Tournament ==
First Round; March 9
E5 | Bowdoin | 2
E6 | Neumann | 1
W3 | Wisconsin–Superior | 2
W4 | Hamline | 3*
E3 | Norwich | 5
E7 | Curry | 1

Quarterfinals; March 12
E1 | Oswego State (2) | 7
E5 | Bowdoin | 5
W2 | Adrian (3) | 5
E4 | Elmira | 3
W1 | St. Norbert (1) | 4
W4 | Hamline | 0
E2 | Plattsburgh State (4) | 2
E3 | Norwich | 3*

Semifinals; March 25
E1 | Oswego State (2) | 3
W2 | Adrian (3) | 5
W1 | St. Norbert (1) | 3
E3 | Norwich | 2

National Championship; March 26
W2 | Adrian (3) | 3
W1 | St. Norbert (1) | 4

Note: * denotes overtime period(s)

== See also ==
- 2010–11 NCAA Division I men's ice hockey season
- 2010–11 NCAA Division II men's ice hockey season
