= E. J. Miller Laino =

American poet, author of Girl Hurt (1948–2021)

- Born: March 10, 1948
- Died: November 16, 2021 (aged 73)
- Education: University of Massachusetts Amherst; Fitchburg State College
- Occupation: Poet
- Writing career
- Notable awards: American Book Award (1996)

Eleanor Jane Miller Laino (March 10, 1948 – November 16, 2021) was an American poet, author of Girl Hurt (1995). She had a new collection, Cracking Open, forthcoming before her death.

She was educated at the University of Massachusetts Amherst and Fitchburg State College, and lived in Key West and taught at Florida Keys Community College.

Her honors include a Vermont Studio Center fellowship and the 1996 American Book Award, and her work has appeared in literary journals and magazines including The American Poetry Review, New York Quarterly, and Poetry East.

== Honors and awards ==
- 1996 American Book Award for Girl Hurt
- Prairie Schooner Readers' Choice Award

== Published works ==
=== Poetry collections ===
- —— (1995). Girl Hurt. Alice James Books. ISBN 9781882295074.
- —— (2000). Turning.

=== Anthologies edited ===
- Robert Cording; Shelli Jankowski-Smith; E. J. Miller Laino, eds. (1998). In My Life: Encounters with The Beatles. Fromm International Pub. Co. ISBN 9780880641920.
