= Gardner High School =

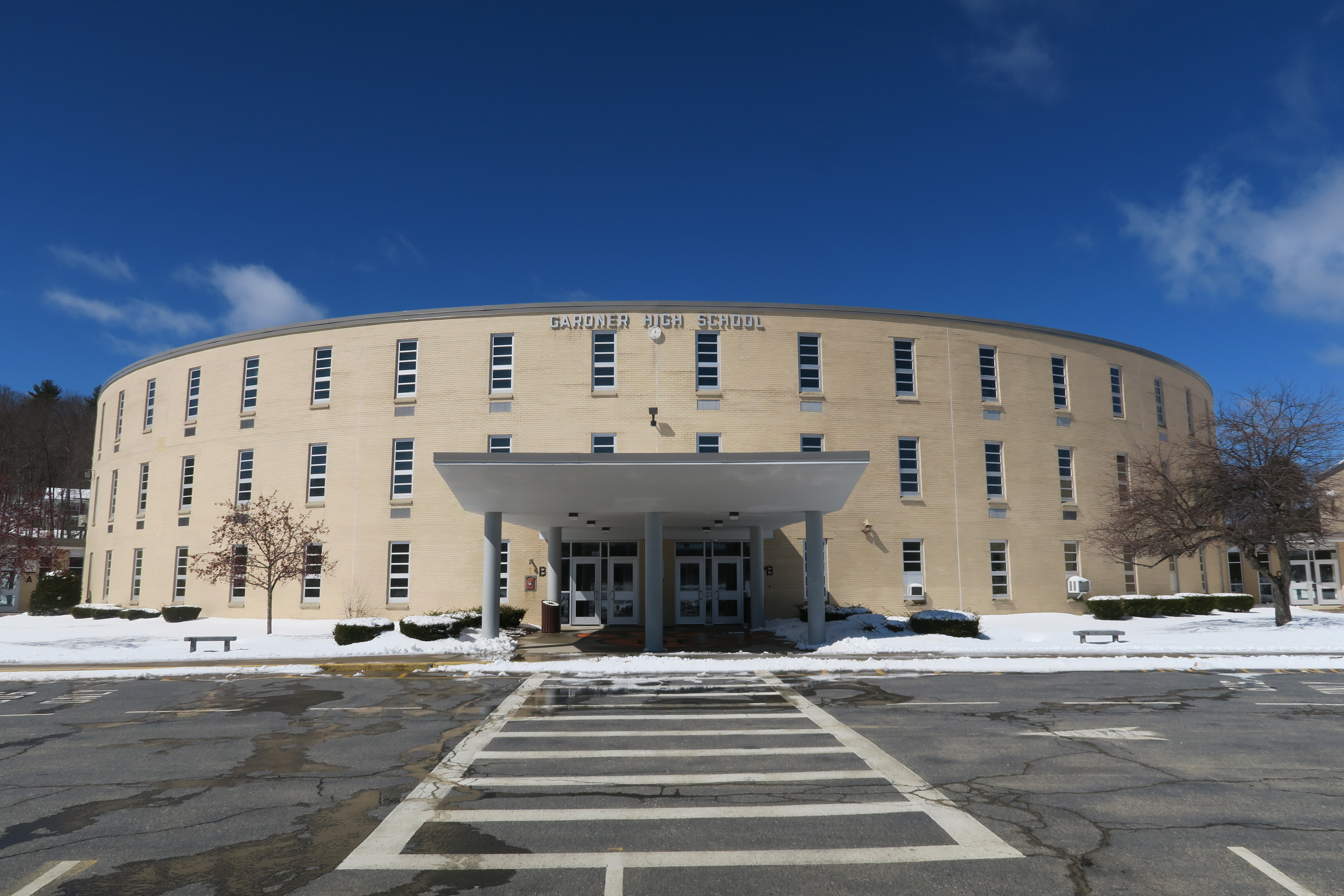
- View of Gardner High School in 2017.

Location
- 200 Catherine Street; Gardner, Massachusetts 01440; United States; 42.583010°N 71.979020°W

Information
- Type: Public high school
- Motto: Labor omnia vincit
- Established: 1872
- School district: Gardner Public Schools
- Superintendent: Mark J. Pellegrino
- Principal: Michael Bartkus
- Faculty: 60
- Grades: 8-12
- Enrollment: 808 (2024–2025)
- Colors: Orange and black
- Athletics conference: Midland Wachusett League
- Team name: Wildcats
- Newspaper: Gardner News
- Yearbook: Argus
- Website: Official website

Gardner High School is a public high school in Gardner, Massachusetts.

== History ==
Gardner High School was established in 1872, with the first graduating class being the Class of 1876. In 1897, a school building was designed by the architecture firm Barker & Nourse and was located at 130 Elm Street.

In 1978, Walt Dubzinski, Class of 1937, was named principal of Gardner High. From 1946 to 1966, Dubzinski served as the school football coach, and was named assistant principal in 1966.

In 1943, Norman Rockwell donated his painting titled Willie Gillis in Convoy to Gardner High School. The work of art was auctioned off by Sotheby's in 2014 to benefit the school.

== Athletics ==
Home of the Wildcats, Gardner High School athletic teams sport the colors of orange and black. The school offers athletic teams in a variety of sports, including: baseball, basketball, cheerleading, cross country, field hockey, football, golf, ice hockey, soccer, softball, swimming, tennis, and track and field.

== Notable alumni ==
- Samantha Arsenault, Olympic swimmer
- Red Blanchard, radio personality
- Jacques Cesaire (1998), professional football player
- Karl Dean (1974), politician
- Walt Dubzinski (1937), professional football player
- Mark Gearan (1974), director of the Peace Corps
- Hadassah Lieberman (1966), wife of Joe Lieberman
- Bob Menne (1960–2023), professional golfer
- Frank Morze (1951), professional football player
- Mark Pieloch (1975), business executive
- Peter Roberts (1962), inventor
- Robert D. Wetmore, politician
- Jonathan Zlotnik (2008), politician

== See also ==
- List of high schools in Massachusetts
