= 2016–17 NCAA Division III men's ice hockey season =

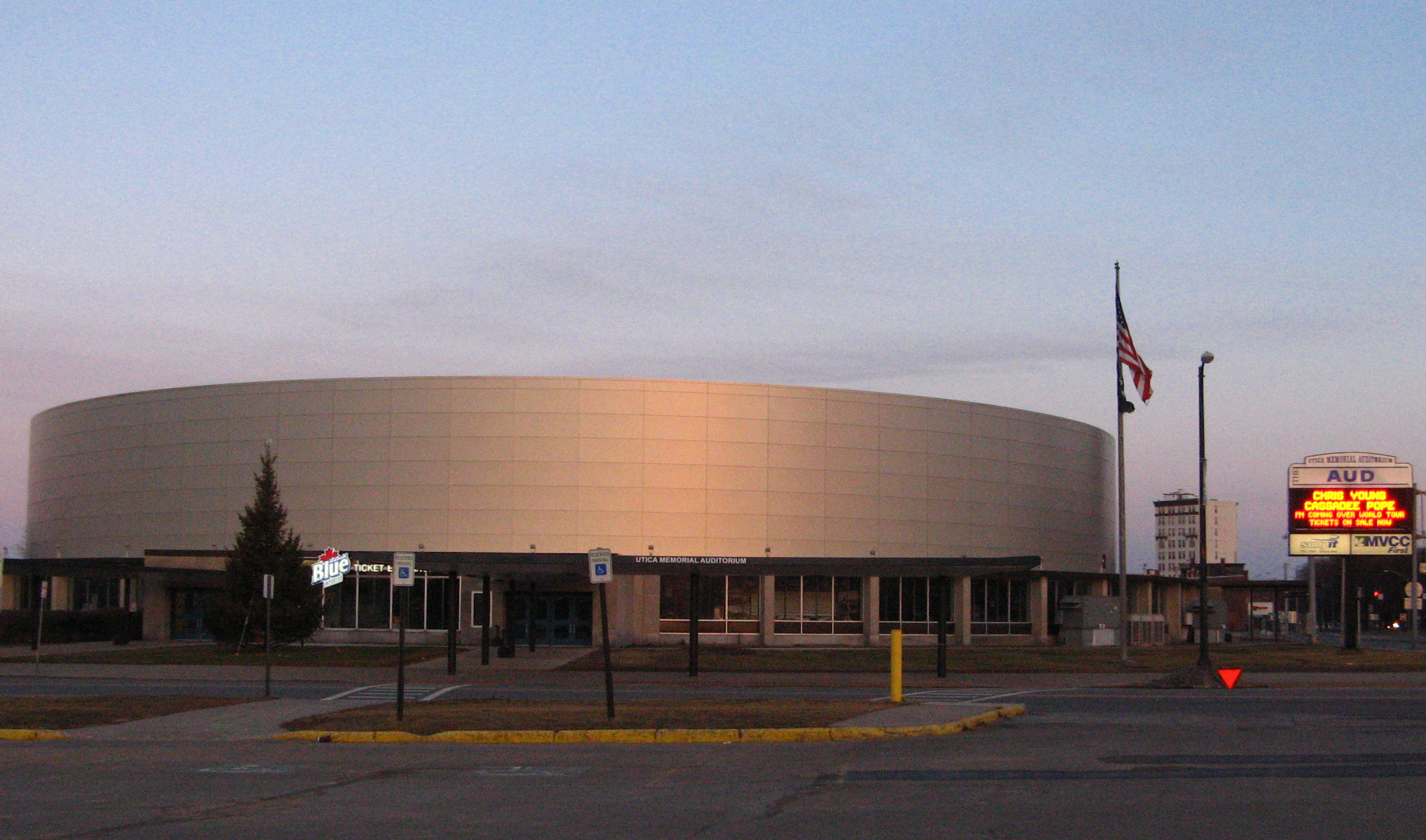
- The Utica Memorial Arena was the host of the 2017 Frozen Four
- Duration: October 28, 2016– March 25, 2017
- NCAA tournament: 2017
- National championship: Utica Memorial Auditorium; Utica, New York
- NCAA champion: Norwich Cadets
- Sid Watson Award: Evan Buitenhuis (Hamilton)

The 2016–17 NCAA Division III men's ice hockey season began on October 28, 2016, and concluded on March 25, 2017. This was the 44th season of Division III college ice hockey.

The Commonwealth Coast Conference, the primary league for six of the nine members of ECAC Northeast and one member of the NEHC, began sponsoring men's ice hockey this season. Because seven teams is the minimum requirement for a league to qualify for an automatic bid the new conference would be able to retain the qualifier formerly possessed by ECAC Northeast. The three remaining ECAC Northeast teams (Becker, Johnson & Wales and Suffolk) joined CCC as affiliate members for at least men's ice hockey.

The NCAA also increased the number of participants in the National Tournament to twelve.

== Regular season ==
=== Standings ===
2016–17 Commonwealth Coast Conference ice hockey standings
	Conference							Overall					
	GP	W	L	T	PTS	GF	GA	GP	W	L	T	GF	GA
Endicott †*	18	14	3	1	29	91	34	30	24	4	2	145	59
Nichols	18	11	3	4	26	62	38	27	15	7	5	89	69
Salve Regina	18	11	4	3	25	67	46	26	14	8	4	88	69
Curry	18	11	5	2	24	70	60	26	14	10	2	90	87
University of New England	18	9	7	2	20	88	57	27	15	10	2	129	88
Johnson & Wales	18	6	9	3	15	54	54	27	11	12	4	82	76
Becker	18	5	12	1	11	40	84	26	6	19	1	57	121
Western New England	18	5	12	1	11	43	77	26	8	16	2	60	104
Suffolk	18	4	11	3	11	35	72	25	7	13	5	59	94
Wentworth	18	3	13	2	8	30	58	25	5	17	3	52	80
Championship: March 4, 2017 † indicates conference regular season champion * indicates conference tournament champions

2016–17 ECAC West standings
	Conference							Overall					
	GP	W	L	T	PTS	GF	GA	GP	W	L	T	GF	GA
Utica †	14	12	2	0	24	57	28	27	18	9	0	101	75
Manhattanville	14	10	4	0	20	55	43	26	14	11	1	94	84
Hobart *	14	9	4	1	19	60	39	29	20	5	4	115	69
Nazareth	14	8	6	0	16	51	40	26	9	15	2	69	86
Neumann	14	7	6	1	15	51	48	27	16	8	3	118	79
Stevenson	14	4	9	1	9	36	53	26	10	14	2	69	93
Elmira	14	3	11	0	6	37	57	25	8	16	1	76	96
Lebanon Valley	14	1	12	1	3	40	79	25	4	19	2	76	123
Championship: March 4, 2017 † indicates conference regular season champion * indicates conference tournament champions

2016–17 NCAA Division III Independent ice hockey standings
	Overall record					
	GP	W	L	T	GF	GA
Canton State	25	7	16	2	72	101
Daniel Webster	25	1	23	1	39	148

2016–17 Massachusetts State Collegiate Athletic Conference ice hockey standings
	Conference							Overall					
	GP	W	L	T	PTS	GF	GA	GP	W	L	T	GF	GA
Plymouth State †	18	16	1	1	33	80	32	27	19	6	2	113	62
Salem State *	18	12	4	2	26	69	49	28	15	10	3	88	81
Massachusetts–Dartmouth	18	12	6	0	24	71	56	26	17	9	0	98	85
Fitchburg State	18	7	10	1	15	52	58	27	11	15	1	76	98
Worcester State	18	6	10	2	14	48	53	26	9	14	3	70	76
Westfield State	18	6	12	0	12	56	64	26	11	15	0	83	77
Framingham State	18	1	17	0	2	26	90	25	2	23	0	45	132
Championship: March 4, 2017 † indicates conference regular season champion * indicates conference tournament champions

2016–17 Minnesota Intercollegiate Athletic Conference ice hockey standings
	Conference								Overall					
	GP	W	L	T	SW	PTS	GF	GA	GP	W	L	T	GF	GA
St. Thomas †	16	11	3	2	1	36	65	40	27	14	8	5	86	66
Augsburg *	16	9	2	5	1	33	64	35	28	17	5	6	109	75
Saint Mary's	16	9	6	1	1	29	48	46	26	13	10	3	88	78
Hamline	16	7	5	4	2	27	54	46	26	10	10	6	84	78
Concordia (MN)	16	7	7	2	2	25	47	52	27	14	11	2	74	79
Saint John's	16	7	7	2	0	23	43	48	25	12	10	3	61	81
St. Olaf	16	5	9	2	1	18	39	51	25	7	15	3	61	81
Gustavus Adolphus	16	4	10	2	2	16	31	42	25	5	15	5	51	71
Bethel	16	2	12	2	1	9	40	65	25	3	20	2	63	106
Championship: March 4, 2017 † indicates conference regular season champion * indicates conference tournament champion

2016–17 New England Hockey Conference standings
	Conference							Overall					
	GP	W	L	T	PTS	GF	GA	GP	W	L	T	GF	GA
Division III
Norwich †*	18	16	1	1	33	80	26	31	27	1	3	134	54
New England College	18	13	5	0	26	73	37	27	19	8	0	103	56
Babson	18	11	5	2	24	46	29	27	15	9	3	71	54
Castleton	18	9	5	4	22	55	43	27	11	10	6	76	70
Skidmore	18	9	6	3	21	56	45	26	10	12	4	68	78
Massachusetts–Boston	18	7	9	2	16	60	52	26	12	11	3	98	72
Southern Maine	18	5	12	1	11	43	56	26	9	15	2	59	71
Division II
Saint Anselm	18	7	10	1	15	48	49	26	12	12	2	78	66
Saint Michael's	18	4	13	1	9	34	71	27	9	16	2	62	96
Championship: March 4, 2017 † indicates conference regular season champion * indicates conference tournament champion

2016–17 New England Small College Athletic Conference ice hockey standings
	Conference							Overall					
	GP	W	L	T	PTS	GF	GA	GP	W	L	T	GF	GA
Hamilton †	18	11	3	4	26	50	28	29	20	5	4	92	54
Colby	18	11	4	3	25	47	36	24	13	7	4	75	61
Trinity *	18	11	5	2	24	65	35	31	21	7	3	123	58
Williams	18	10	5	3	23	57	49	26	14	9	3	78	67
Amherst	18	9	6	3	21	44	38	24	14	7	3	73	49
Tufts	18	9	8	1	19	43	44	25	11	11	3	59	60
Wesleyan	18	7	7	4	18	46	49	26	13	9	4	80	65
Bowdoin	18	5	12	1	11	50	65	25	8	16	1	79	93
Connecticut College	18	2	13	3	7	32	56	23	4	16	3	49	74
Middlebury	18	3	15	0	6	32	66	24	3	19	2	44	86
Championship: March 5, 2017 † indicates conference regular season champion * indicates conference tournament champion

2016–17 Northern Collegiate Hockey Association standings
	Conference							Overall					
	GP	W	L	T	PTS	GF	GA	GP	W	L	T	GF	GA
North
St. Norbert *	20	15	4	1	31	78	31	29	22	6	1	109	48
St. Scholastica	20	10	9	1	21	69	66	27	13	13	1	84	82
Northland	20	9	10	1	19	69	72	26	11	13	2	84	96
Lawrence	20	5	12	3	13	49	61	25	6	16	3	59	85
Finlandia	20	0	20	0	0	25	99	25	0	25	0	30	125
South
Adrian †	20	17	3	0	34	99	39	29	20	7	2	130	67
Marian	20	12	7	1	25	64	56	27	15	10	2	88	79
Lake Forest	20	12	8	0	24	70	57	26	16	10	0	93	70
MSOE	20	9	7	4	22	59	56	25	12	8	5	76	70
Concordia (WI)	20	10	9	1	21	56	60	25	13	11	1	72	74
Aurora	20	4	14	2	10	38	79	25	4	19	2	43	107
Championship: March 4, 2017 † indicates conference regular season champion * indicates conference tournament champion

2016–17 State University of New York Athletic Conference ice hockey standings
	Conference							Overall					
	GP	W	L	T	PTS	GF	GA	GP	W	L	T	GF	GA
Oswego State †	16	13	2	1	27	77	32	28	21	6	1	129	55
Plattsburgh State *	16	10	5	1	21	54	51	28	17	10	1	95	92
Geneseo State	16	10	5	1	21	71	42	27	17	7	3	125	76
Buffalo State	16	9	6	1	19	45	41	27	18	8	1	92	63
Fredonia State	16	7	8	1	15	50	49	26	13	11	2	109	73
Brockport State	16	7	9	0	14	59	68	26	11	14	1	86	100
Cortland State	16	6	9	1	13	60	74	25	10	13	2	94	106
Morrisville State	16	4	9	3	11	63	79	25	5	16	4	88	119
Potsdam State	16	1	14	1	3	31	74	25	6	17	2	61	102
Championship: March 4, 2017 † indicates conference regular season champion * indicates conference tournament champions

2016–17 Wisconsin Intercollegiate Athletic Conference ice hockey standings
	Conference							Overall					
	GP	W	L	T	PTS	GF	GA	GP	W	L	T	GF	GA
Wisconsin–Stevens Point †*	8	7	1	0	14	35	15	29	21	5	3	126	72
Wisconsin–Eau Claire	8	5	3	0	10	27	16	28	18	7	3	103	61
Wisconsin–River Falls	8	3	4	1	7	15	18	27	12	13	2	64	61
Wisconsin–Stout	8	3	5	0	6	22	33	27	12	13	2	76	91
Wisconsin–Superior	8	1	6	1	3	12	29	29	8	19	2	76	105
Championship: March 4, 2017 † indicates conference regular season champion * indicates conference tournament champion

Note: Mini-game are not included in final standings

== Player stats ==
=== Scoring leaders ===
GP = Games played; G = Goals; A = Assists; Pts = Points; PIM = Penalty minutes

Player	Class	Team	GP	G	A	Pts	PIM
Brady Fleurent	Sophomore	University of New England	26	18	35	53	30
Tommy Besinger	Sophomore	Endicott	30	18	31	49	36
Stephen Collins	Senior	Geneseo State	27	19	29	48	14
William Pelletier	Senior	Norwich	23	18	28	46	11
Trevor Fleurent	Senior	University of New England	25	20	25	45	16
Ken Neil	Senior	Oswego State	28	19	26	45	2
Jory Mullin	Senior	Neumann	25	26	18	44	12
Lawrence Cornellier	Senior	Wisconsin–Stevens Point	29	24	19	43	43
Ryan Bloom	Freshman	University of New England	26	20	23	43	4
Shawn Hulshof	Senior	Oswego State	28	13	28	41	22

=== Leading goaltenders ===
GP = Games played; Min = Minutes played; W = Wins; L = Losses; T = Ties; GA = Goals against; SO = Shutouts; SV% = Save percentage; GAA = Goals against average

Player	Class	Team	GP	Min	W	L	T	GA	SO	SV%	GAA
T.J. Black	Junior	St. Norbert	21	1241	17	3	1	27	6	.939	1.31
Ty Reichenbach	Senior	Norwich	17	885	11	1	3	24	3	.937	1.63
Matt Pompa	Sophomore	Babson	15	830	8	5	1	24	2	.943	1.73
Matt Leon	Senior	Geneseo State	11	511	6	2	0	15	2	.935	1.76
Alex Morin	Junior	Trinity	29	1763	19	7	3	52	3	.934	1.77
Evan Buitenhuis	Junior	Hamilton	26	1582	17	5	4	47	2	.941	1.78
Braeden Ostepchuk	Junior	Norwich	18	986	16	0	0	30	2	.924	1.83
Matt Zawadzki	Senior	Oswego State	14	750	9	3	1	23	2	.914	1.84
Zach Quinn	Freshman	Wisconsin–River Falls	22	1297	10	9	2	41	3	.924	1.90
Mike DeLaVergne	Senior	Buffalo State	25	1458	17	7	1	48	3	.927	1.98
Brett Kilar	Senior	New England College	26	1544	18	8	0	51	5	.941	1.98

== 2017 NCAA Tournament ==
First Round; March 11
E1	Norwich (1)	3
E8	Salem State	1
E4	Oswego State	1
E5	Hamilton	3
E2	Hobart	3
E7	Endicott	4
E3	Trinity	4
E6	Plattsburgh State	1

Quarterfinals; March 18
W2	Adrian	6
W3	Wisconsin–Stevens Point	3
E1	Norwich (1)	6
E5	Hamilton	2
W1	St. Norbert	4*
W4	Augsburg	3
E7	Endicott	1
E3	Trinity	2**

Semifinals; March 24
W2	Adrian	4
E1	Norwich (1)	5*
W1	St. Norbert	2
E3	Trinity	3

National Championship; March 25
E1	Norwich (1)	4
E3	Trinity	1

Note: * denotes overtime period(s)

== Awards ==
=== NCAA ===
Award		Recipient
Sid Watson Award		Evan Buitenhuis, Hamilton
Edward Jeremiah Award		Mike McShane (Norwich)
Tournament Most Outstanding Player		William Pelletier, Norwich
East First Team	Position	West First Team
Evan Buitenhuis, Hamilton	G	T.J. Black, St. Norbert
Stephen Johnson, Oswego State	D	Cory Dunn, Adrian
Cody Smith, Norwich	D	Rory Vesel, Augsburg
Stephen Collins, Geneseo State	F	Lawrence Cornellier, Wisconsin–Stevens Point
Brady Fleurent, University of New England	F	Jack Lewis, Lake Forest
Colin Larkin, Massachusetts–Boston	F	Patrick Moore, Wisconsin–Eau Claire
East Second Team	Position	West Second Team
Brett Kilar, New England College	G	Benjamin Myers, St. Thomas
Tyler Bishop, Massachusetts–Boston	D	Sean Campbell, St. Norbert
Logan Day, Endicott	D	Mitch Hall, Hamline
Dominik Gabaj, Nazareth	F	Trevor Boyd, Adrian
Jory Mullin, Neumann	F	Nate Flynn, Augsburg
William Pelletier, Norwich	F	Thomas Williams, St. Thomas
East Third Team	Position	
Mike DeLaVergne, Buffalo State	G	
Carl Belizario, Hobart	D	
Ayrton Valente, Plattsburgh State	D	
Tommy Besinger, Endicott	F	
Trevor Fleurent, University of New England	F	
Kenny Neil, Oswego State	F	

== See also ==
- 2016–17 NCAA Division I men's ice hockey season
- 2016–17 NCAA Division II men's ice hockey season
