= WXPL =

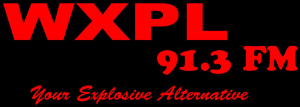
- Fitchburg, Massachusetts; United States
- Broadcast area: Montachusett-North County
- Frequency: 91.3 MHz

Programming
- Format: College

Ownership
- Owner: Fitchburg State University

History
- First air date: August 1985
- Call sign meaning: "Explosive"

Technical information
- Licensing authority: FCC
- Facility ID: 21667
- Class: A
- ERP: 100 watts
- HAAT: −41 meters (−135 ft)
- Transmitter coordinates: 42°35′18.3″N 71°47′24.2″W

Links
- Public license information: Public file; LMS
- Webcast: Listen live

WXPL (91.3 FM) is a radio station licensed to serve Fitchburg, Massachusetts. The station is owned by Fitchburg State University. It airs a college radio format.

The station was assigned the WXPL call letters by the Federal Communications Commission on September 26, 1984.

The station has a long record of maintaining an erratic broadcast schedule. The station's official Web site notes that the station is "back on air" again after a recent transmitter problem and once again broadcasting in stereo.

== Honors and awards ==
In 1990, WXPL was named Volunteer Group of the Year by the Fitchburg State College Alumni Association. The station was recognized for its help with phone-a-thons, reunions and other special events.

In 2004, WXPL received the Organization of the Year award from Fitchburg State College at the college's 27th annual Spring Honors Convocation.

WXPL hosted a concert in 2001 in the Parkinson's Gym featuring Boston hardcore band Tree along with Colepitz and Unearth.

In 2011, WXPL along with radio show "The Local Flavor" brought Bomb the Music Industry! to Fitchburg State, where they played in the Hammond Main Lounge.

== Recent history ==
In 2008, Ben Hassey took over as general manager. His goal was to improve the radio station’s reputation by making it more organized and professional. WXPL had weekly executive board and DJ meetings, a station clean-up, and DJ training. WXPL's advisers delayed turning on the transmitter by having the station painted. By October 2008, WXPL was briefly on the air; problems once again arose with the advisers, however, and the station was shut down. A radio-station consultant was called in to evaluate the equipment and explain how to get the station up and running in proper and legal fashion. Many changes were made, equipment was purchased and by mid-year, the station was back up again.

On October 19, 2009, the station made its most recent return to the airwaves. During the fall 2009 semester, WXPL sponsored two campus events - an open-mic night and a concert - and was making plans to sponsor more.
