= Walt Dubzinski =

American football player (1919–2003)

No. 12, 39
- Positions: Center, Guard

Personal information
- Born: October 26, 1919; Gardner, Massachusetts, U.S.
- Died: April 26, 2013 (aged 93); Gardner, Massachusetts, U.S.
- Listed height: 5 ft 10 in (1.78 m)
- Listed weight: 205 lb (93 kg)

Career information
- High school: Gardner (Gardner, Massachusetts)
- College: Boston College (1938-1940)

Career history
- Pittsfield Golden Bears (1941); Holyoke Golden Bears (1942); New York Giants (1943); Boston Yanks (1944)

Career statistics
- Games played: 8
- Games started: 2
- Interceptions: 1
- Stats at Pro Football Reference

Walter John Dubzinski Sr. (October 26, 1919 – April 26, 2013) was an American football center and guard in the National Football League (NFL) for the New York Giants and Boston Yanks.

== Career ==
Born to Felix and Anna Lauciniunas, Dubzinski graduated from Gardner High School in 1937, where he played football and was a co-captain. He went on to attend Boston College and played football as a fullback, linebacker, and center there under Gil Dobie and Frank Leahy from 1938 to 1940. Dubzinski was the starting center in the 1940 season, when the team went undefeated with an 11–0 record and defeated the Tennessee Volunteers in the 1941 Sugar Bowl.

After graduating from Boston College with a Bachelor of Science in education in 1941, Dubzinski went on to play professional football in local independent leagues for the Golden Bears of Pittsfield and Holyoke, respectively. That year, he was also hired as the football coach of Rockland High School, and then coached at Fitchburg High School.

In 1943, Dubzinski signed for the New York Giants of the National Football League (NFL). He played five games during the 1943 season, which included an interception, under Steve Owen. The team also claimed the division title. In the following year, he moved on to the Boston Yanks, playing in three games, while starting two of them, under Herb Kopf.

In 1945, Dubzinski served in the United States Navy, stationed at Naval Air Station Jacksonville, during World War II.

In the following year, Dubzinski returned to coaching. This time, he was hired as the head coach of his alma mater, Gardner High, where he stayed on for twenty seasons and compiled a 130-41-6 record. In 1952, he completed a Master of Education degree from Fitchburg State University. After retiring from coaching in 1966, he was named Assistant Principal at Gardner, and was promoted to Principal in 1978, a post he held until 1983.

In 1994, Dubzinski was inducted into the Boston College Varsity Club Hall of Fame.

== Personal life ==
Both Dubzinski's brother, John E., and son, Walter Jr., played football for Boston College. John overlapped with his brother's final season, and continued on to play for the team (1940–1942). Unlike his father, the younger was a running back (1962–1963).

Dubzinski was married to Ruth A. O'Hearn, with whom he had four children: Walter Jr., Pamela, John, and Anne.
