= Lydia O'Leary =

American entrepreneur (1900–1982)

Lydia O'Leary (1900-1982) was the inventor of foundation makeup designed to cover birthmarks and discolorations; she received a patent for her invention in 1932. Her company, Covermark Beauty, is still in existence, now a subsidiary of Pias Intercosmex.

== Early life ==
O'Leary was born in Bedford, Massachusetts with a large port-wine stain birthmark on the left side of her face. She graduated from the Fitchburg Normal School for Teachers (now Fitchburg State University) in 1921. After two years of teaching, she moved to New York to try to break into retail sales, but was unable to find employment because of the birthmark. At this time, adherence to traditional standards of feminine beauty was a legal criteria for retail employment; now it is considered a form of employment discrimination.

== Inventing and patenting ==
Corporate legend has it that she took a job painting cards and placards, corrected a painting mistake, and was inspired to begin to experiment with various formulas for consistency of coverage and tone.

Her initial patent application was denied, but she was granted U.S. patent number 1877952 after an appeal hearing during which she removed her makeup in a "vivid and dramatic" way to expose the port-wine stain that the reviewers had not been aware of.

== Covermark ==
O'Leary went on to found the cosmetics company Covermark, diversifying into other beauty and skincare products. During and after World War II, she "worked with plastic surgeons and dermatologists for rehabilitation of war wounded." She was interviewed about her work as a "Cosmetics Firm Founder" on the "We, The People" television talk show in an episode that aired 14 June 1949. In the second half of the twentieth century, many cosmetics companies followed her lead and started producing items intended to mask birthmarks, scars, and other discolorations. In the 1980s, Covermark promoted its products beyond a traditional female customer base, targeting "men and children who have never used makeup before." O'Leary is termed a "pioneer in the field" of corrective makeup.

== Personal life ==
She married New York grocery magnate James Reeves (1890-1957) in 1945. She was active in many New York charities and cultural institutions, serving as a trustee or committee member at St. Vincents Hospital, the New York Philharmonic, the Metropolitan Museum of Art, and the Museum of Modern Art. In 1954, Salvador Dali painted her portrait. At the time of her death, she lived at 740 Park Avenue in Manhattan and owned a vacation home in Southampton, Long Island. She is remembered as an entrepreneur and company president.
