= Wallace Civic Center =

Multi-purpose arena in Fitchburg, Massachusetts

Coordinates: 42.5949°N 71.7845°W

George R. Wallace Jr. Civic Center
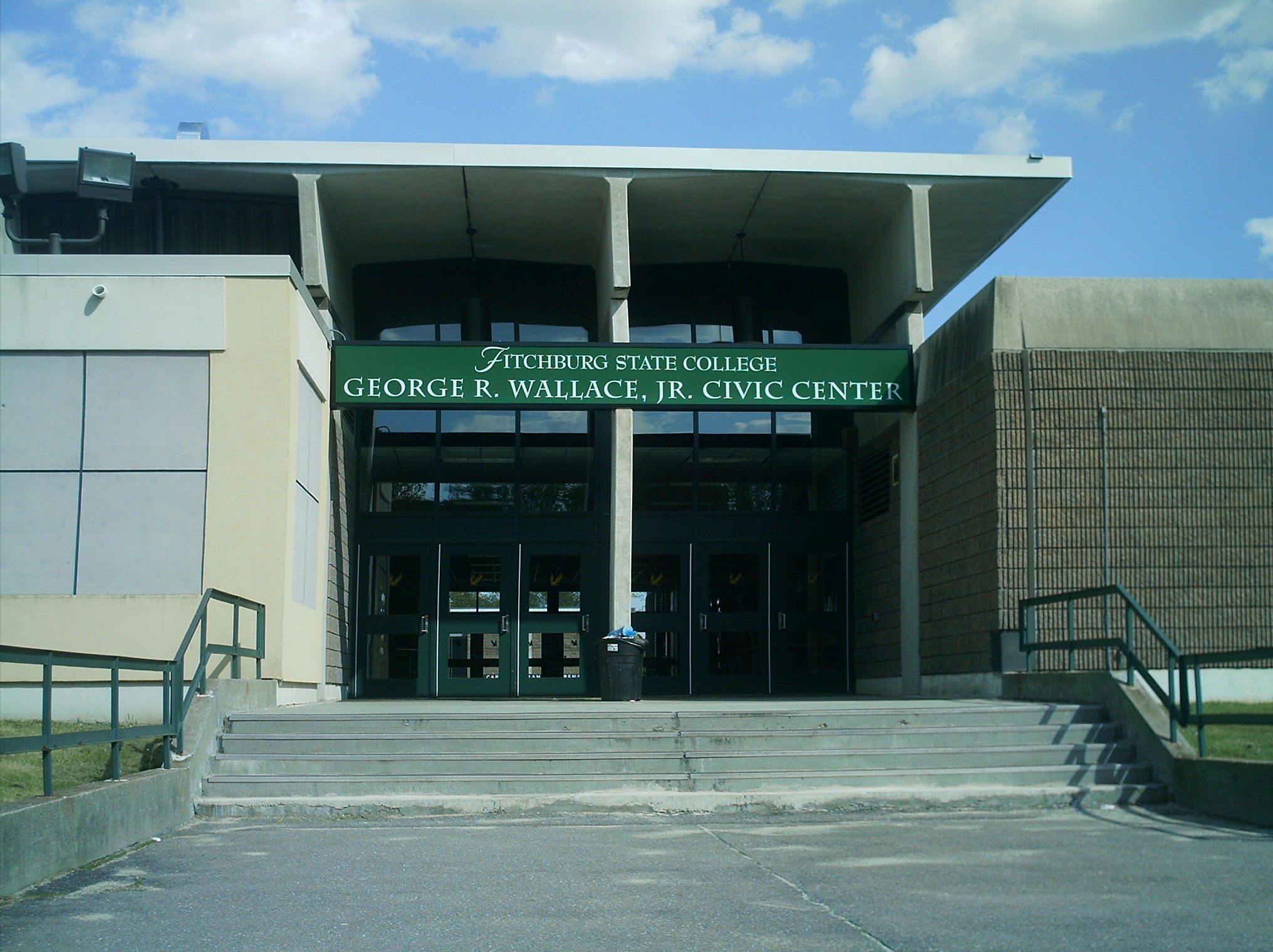
- Interactive map of George R. Wallace Jr. Civic Center
- Location: 1000 John Fitch Highway Fitchburg, Massachusetts
- Owner: Fitchburg State University
- Operator: FMC Arenas
- Capacity: 1,000 (hockey); 3,200 (concerts)

Construction
- Opened: 1970

Tenant
- Fitchburg State Falcons ice hockey

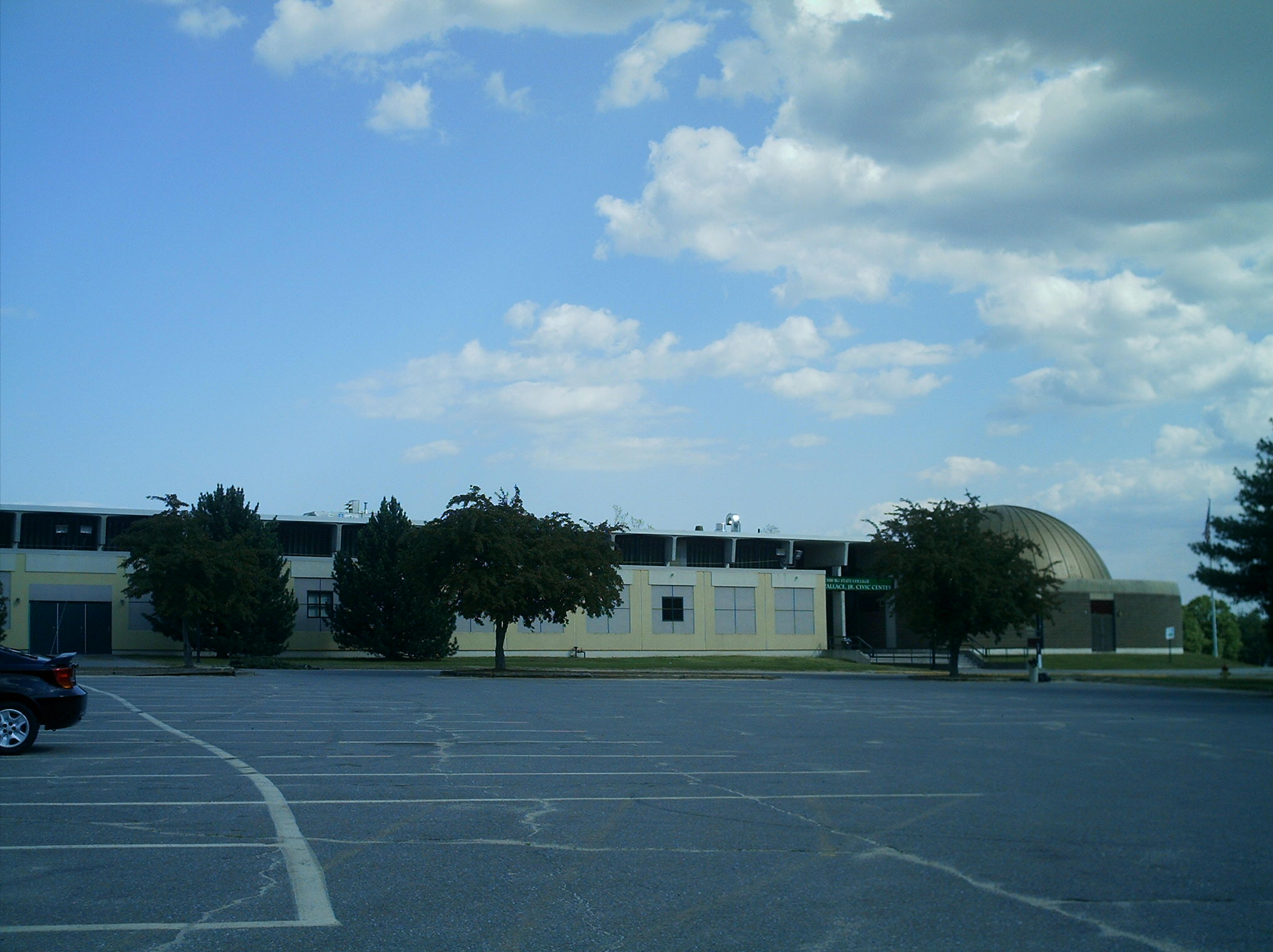
Wallace Civic Center in Fitchburg, Massachusetts

The George R. Wallace Jr. Civic Center, more commonly known as the Civic Center, is a 1,000-seat multi-purpose arena in Fitchburg, Massachusetts and has an end-stage concert capacity of 3,200. It hosts various local concerts and sporting events for the area. First opened in 1970, the Wallace Civic Center consists of the Gaetz Arena, the Landry Arena, a planetarium, and several multi-use banquet rooms.

== History ==
The Wallace Civic Center opened in 1970 due to funding by George Wallace, a Fitchburg resident. it consisted of two separate ice rinks and a planetarium.

In the nearly 40 years since the Civic Center opened, it has hosted public skating, summer camps, hockey leagues, figure skating, trade shows, concerts, tournaments, events and private functions. Notably it has hosted a Moon rock and hockey games featuring the Boston Bruins.

During the 1990s the Civic Center witnessed a large number of performances by large Alternative rock bands such as Nirvana, The Foo Fighters, Jane's Addiction, The Smashing Pumpkins, Fugazi, Soundgarden, and Rage Against the Machine. As the Civic Center slowly fell into disrepair over the course of the decades the planetarium had to be closed, and concerts fell into disfavor.

Control and ownership of the Civic Center was transferred from the City of Fitchburg to Fitchburg State University in August 2007. Since this transfer, the college has performed many upgrades to the Civic Center. These include new roofing, new ice making machinery and ventilation, and overall refurbishment. They have also transformed the Landry Arena into an indoor turf field.

== Teams ==
The Civic Center is home to the Fitchburg State Falcons division III college ice hockey team and a new junior team, as well as the Bay State Brawlers Roller Derby league. It is also the home of hockey teams from North Middlesex Regional High School, Leominster High School, Fitchburg High School, and Lunenburg High School.
