= Fitchburg State University =

Public university in Fitchburg, Massachusetts, US

- Former names: State Normal School in Fitchburg (1894–1932); State Teachers College at Fitchburg (1932–1960); State College at Fitchburg (1960–1965); Fitchburg State College (1965–2010)
- Motto: Perseverantia
- Type: Public university
- Established: 1894; 132 years ago
- Accreditation: NECHE
- Endowment: $31.8 million (2024)
- President: Donna H. Hodge
- Faculty: 194 full-time
- Students: 6,100 (fall 2024)
- Undergraduates: 3,030
- Postgraduates: 3,070
- Location: Fitchburg, Massachusetts, U.S. 42.5889°N 71.7892°W
- Campus: 31.4 acres (12.7 ha) (main campus) 226.2 acres (91.5 ha) total; Urban
- Colors: Green & gold
- Nickname: Falcons
- Sporting affiliations: NCAA Division III – MASCAC, NEFC
- Mascot: Falcon
- Website: fitchburgstate.edu
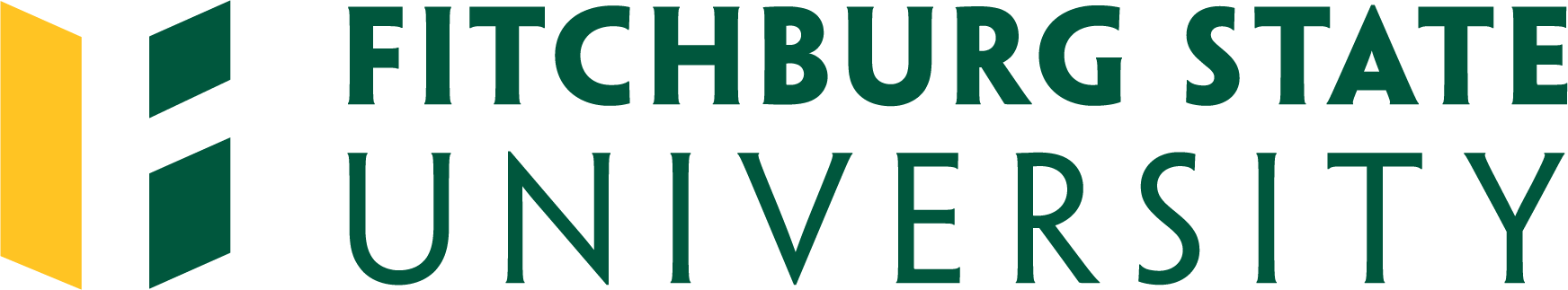

Fitchburg State University (Fitchburg State) is a public university in Fitchburg, Massachusetts, United States. It has 3,421 undergraduate and 1,238 graduate/continuing education students, for a total student body enrollment of 4,659. The university offers undergraduate and graduate degrees in 25 academic disciplines. The main campus, the McKay Campus School, and athletic fields occupy 79 acres (320,000 m^{2}) in the city of Fitchburg; the biological study fields occupy 120 acres (490,000 m^{2}) in the neighboring towns of Lancaster, Leominster, and Lunenburg.

== History ==
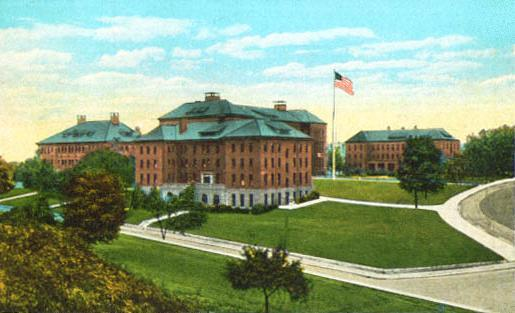
The State Normal School in Fitchburg

Fitchburg State University was founded as the "State Normal School in Fitchburg" in 1894 by the Massachusetts General Court. Its first President was John G. Thompson (President 1895–1920). Initially a secondary-education school for women, the Normal School was not authorized to grant bachelor's degrees until 1930, after the presidency of William D. Parkinson (1920–1927), and during Charles M. Herlihy's (1927–1945) tenure. In 1932, that authorization was extended to all academic disciplines in Education. At the same time, the name was changed to "State Teachers College at Fitchburg". Charles M. Herlihy died while in office and was succeeded by William J. Sanders (1945–1950) and Ellis F. White (1950–1953).

During Ralph H. Weston's (1953–1963) presidency of the college, the Education program was the primary focus. That changed in 1960, when the school changed its name to "State College at Fitchburg" and added degree programs outside of Education. In 1965, the college's name evolved into "Fitchburg State College". James J. Hammond (1963–1975), Vincent J. Mara (1975–1995), and Michael P. Riccards (1995–2002) were the next three presidents of the school and added many buildings to the campus, most notably what are now called the Hammond Building and Mara Village.

Under the guidance of President Robert V. Antonucci (2003–2015), the university focused on enhancing its buildings and grounds in addition to growing its academic programs. The school focused on renovations and rehabilitation of underused buildings and areas as opposed to extensive building. Notable buildings include the 3,500-square-foot (330 m^{2}) campus police station (2008) and the Antonucci Science Complex, which included new construction combined with the renovation of the Condike Science Building, in 2011.

Continuing Education at the institution began in the summer of 1915. In 1935 the first graduate programs were established. In July 2010, the Massachusetts House of Representatives and Senate voted to rename Fitchburg State College to Fitchburg State University. The measure was signed into law by Massachusetts Governor Deval Patrick on July 28, 2010.

== Campus ==
The university originally housed students in buildings that now surround the alumni quad.

=== Campus buildings ===
- Hammond Hall contains the Amelia V. Gallucci-Cirio Library, the Information Desk, the Game Room, the Falcon Hub (formerly The Underground Pub), the Follet Bookstore, the Campus Center Cafe, and the North Street Bistro (which includes BYOB, 2Mato, Subway, and Freshens). The third floor houses the student services center which includes the tutor center, math center, writing center, disability services, and counseling services, among others.
- Amelia V. Gallucci-Cirio Library is the main library on campus with over 1 million books, rolls of microfiche, journals, and periodicals, on four floors. It has an extensive collection of children's and young adults books. The Library holds many special collections from notable alumni, faculty, and local residents. These special collections include works from Robert Cormier, well-known author for young adults, and R. A. Salvatore, a prolific fantasy writer, well known for his Forgotten Realms novels and The DemonWars Saga. There are works by Richard Kent, former music teacher for whom Kent Recital Hall was named, Ernst Fandreyer's translation of Gauss' proof, works by William Wolkovich-Valkavicius, as well as papers by John Ellis Van Courtland Moon, former professor of history.
- Thompson Hall, built in 1896, was the university's original building. It is now primarily a classroom building. It is home to the Nursing Department and its laboratories, including a 10-bed mock hospital which is fully equipped to be used in case of an emergency on campus. When the Hammond Campus Center was built, a tunnel that ran to the former Palmer House dormitory was made into a thoroughfare between the second level of the new building and the basement of Thompson Hall.

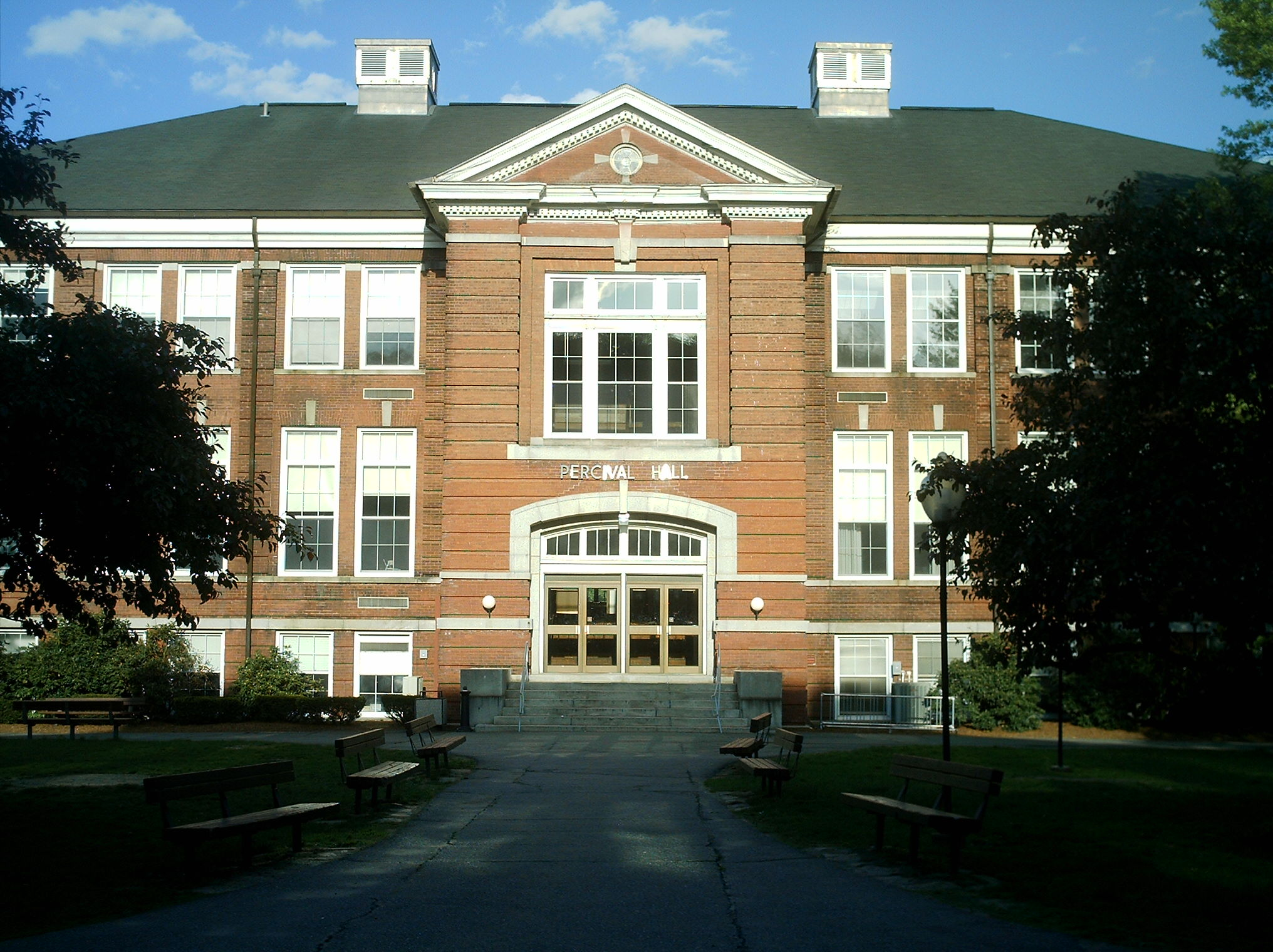
Percival Hall

- Edgerly Hall was first used as "an eighth-grade model and practice school," which made it one of the first junior high schools in America. It is now home to the Computer Science and Mathematics departments, plus computer labs and classrooms.
- Percival Hall is directly across the Quad from Edgerly and is the home of the Behavioral Science department, including psychology, sociology, and criminal justice It also houses Percival Auditorium, which seats 400, and classrooms.
- Miller Hall sits near Percival Hall and Thompson Hall, and houses offices for the English and History departments.
- The Anthony Student Service Center is the student service center on campus, hosting offices for Admissions, Financial Aid, Student Accounts, Graduate and Continuing Education, Registrar, and the OneCard office.
- The Dupont Facilities Building houses the schools maintenance department.
- The Antonucci Science Complex houses science classrooms, laboratories and departmental offices, as well as a 90-seat lecture hall. In 2013, construction of a new "state of the art" 54,700 square foot Science Center Lab Wing was completed, which houses teaching and research laboratory space. In 2014, a full renovation of the pre-existing Condike Science Building was completed. The Antonucci Science Complex currently houses the Department of Geo/Physical Sciences and the Department of Biology and Chemistry.
- The Conlon Arts Building is actually two buildings connected by an enclosed walkway. One building is home to the large communications/media and industrial technology departments and home to the school's Information Technology office. This section of the building includes large video and film production resources, a large photography and graphic arts department, and metal, wood, and theatrical scene shops. The other part contains a 280-seat lecture hall, the offices of the fine arts faculty, as well as art/music studios and classrooms.

The Hammond Campus Center, with Thompson Hall to the left

=== Residence halls ===
The campus has six residence halls, three of which have rooms in suites, two are designated as apartment-style living, and one has a normal dormitory layout.

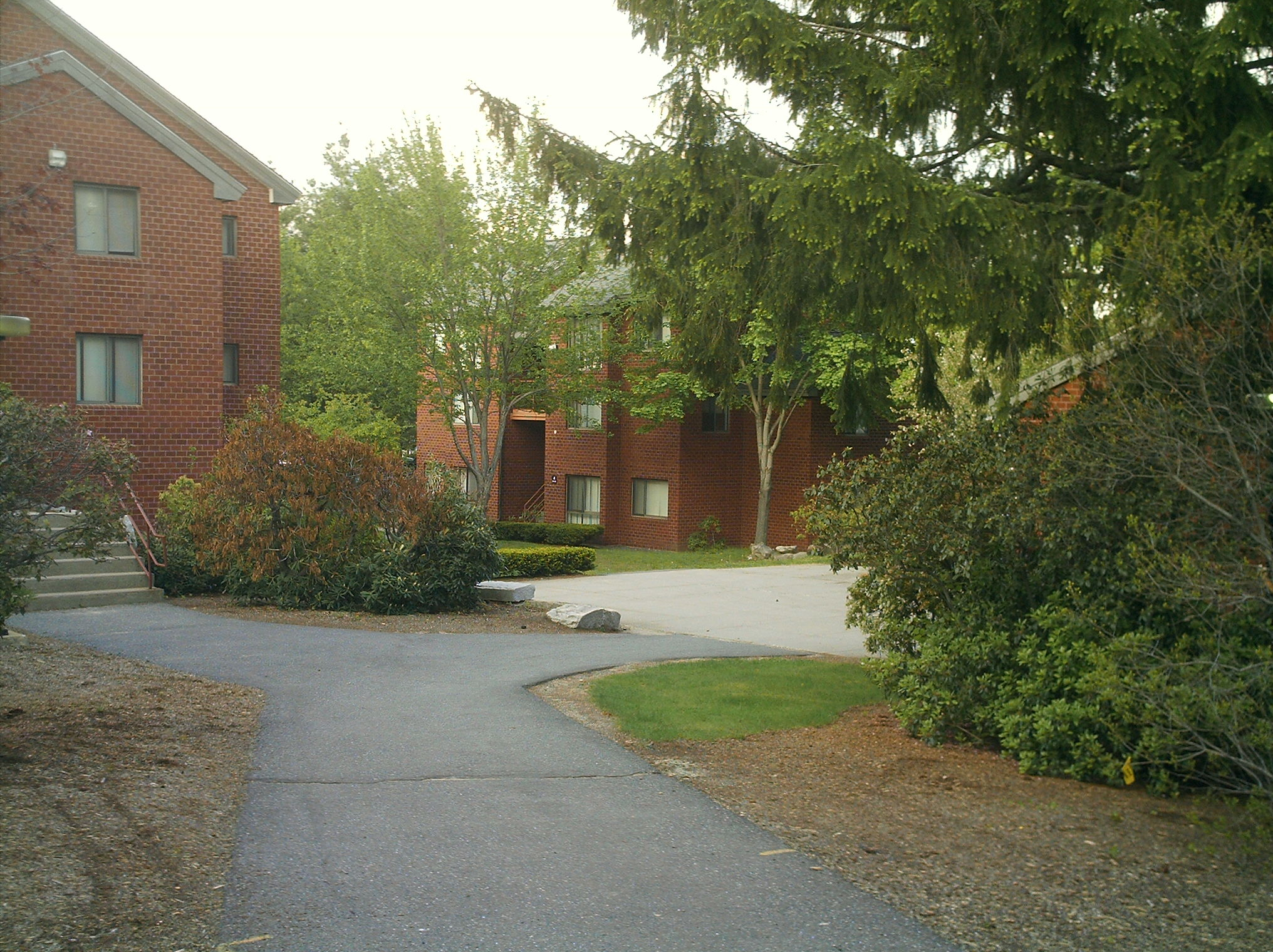
The Townhouse Apartments

Aubuchon Hall, Mara Village, and Russell Towers are the three suite halls. Each suite has a common living room area, four to six rooms, and a bathroom. Aubuchon Hall and Mara Village have "locked off" suites: A key is needed to get into the suites. Aubuchon is home to the office of Housing and Residential Services, which is located on the first floor. Russell is home to the Student Health Service, which provides students with two nurse practitioners and a physician during the week. Recently, the Campus Mail Center moved to the bottom floor of the Mara Village Commons Building located within the Mara complex.

There are two apartment-style residence halls on campus: the Townhouse Apartments and the North Street Apartments. Because of their layout, both of these halls are usually reserved for upperclassmen. Each one of the 33 Townhouses is equipped with a combination living room/kitchen area, one-and-a-half baths, and individual bedrooms. The North Street Apartment building was acquired in the summer of 2007 and consists of six apartments. Each apartment has five single bedrooms, a full bathroom and a half bathroom, a kitchen and a living room area.

Herlihy Hall is the smallest and oldest of the university's current residence halls but has the largest rooms. It houses 150 students in a normal dormitory style (one long corridor with rooms off it), and has the luxury of being connected to the dining commons.

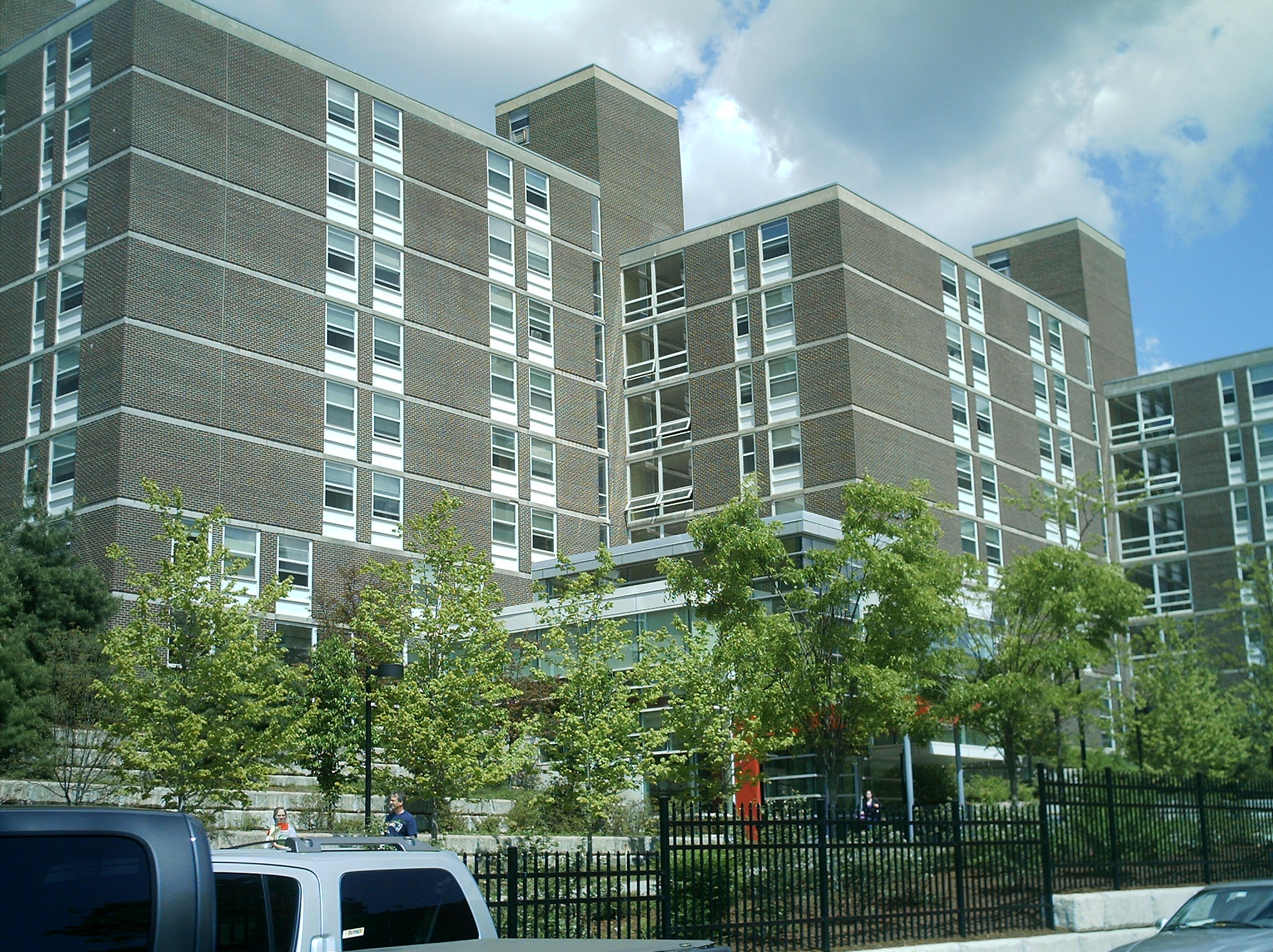
Russell Towers

Mara Village was recently expanded and opened for the fall 2009 semester. The $12 million expansion added 125 beds and allows 50% of the undergraduate population to live on campus.

The campus has also adopted Cedar Street Home as a residence hall. Previously, this building from 1900 was a nursing home. The university bought it in 2005 and to rent the single rooms to girls from sororities. However, in the 2012–2013 academic year the Cedar Street Home became co-ed, and no longer affiliated with sororities specifically.

=== Dining facilities ===
Holmes Dining Commons, known as the Dining Hall, is the main dining facility on campus. It spans North Street, the main road through campus, and lets foot traffic easily move from one side of the street to the other. It is run by the foodservice Chartwells and is buffet style. In the summer of 2006, it had a $4 million renovation.

Chartwells also offers a food court style eating place in the North Street Bistro, located on the street level of the Hammond Campus Center. Food options at the NSB include BYOB, Create, Cafe, Freshens and Subway. Students are able to pay with their 'Fitchburg Gold' (currency loaded onto their student IDs that functions like a debit card) or with the 'Falcon Dollars' which are included within their meal plan.

=== Transportation ===
Transportation around Fitchburg State University's campus is usually accomplished through walking. Also, there is a shuttle bus (Fitchburg/Leominster Fixed Route, Route 4) that goes from the Wallace Civic Center, through campus, and then to the MBTA Commuter Rail stop. The loop takes about 15 minutes.

The MBTA Commuter Rail stop closest to the university is the Fitchburg stop on the Fitchburg Line. The line ends at North Station in Boston, and is about a 90-minute ride. It is wheelchair accessible and a short walk from campus.

On and off campus transportation is a collaboration between the Fitchburg State University and the Montachusett Regional Transit Authority. Faculty, staff, and students can ride any of the Fitchburg/Leominster Fixed-Routes Buses free of charge.

== Academics ==
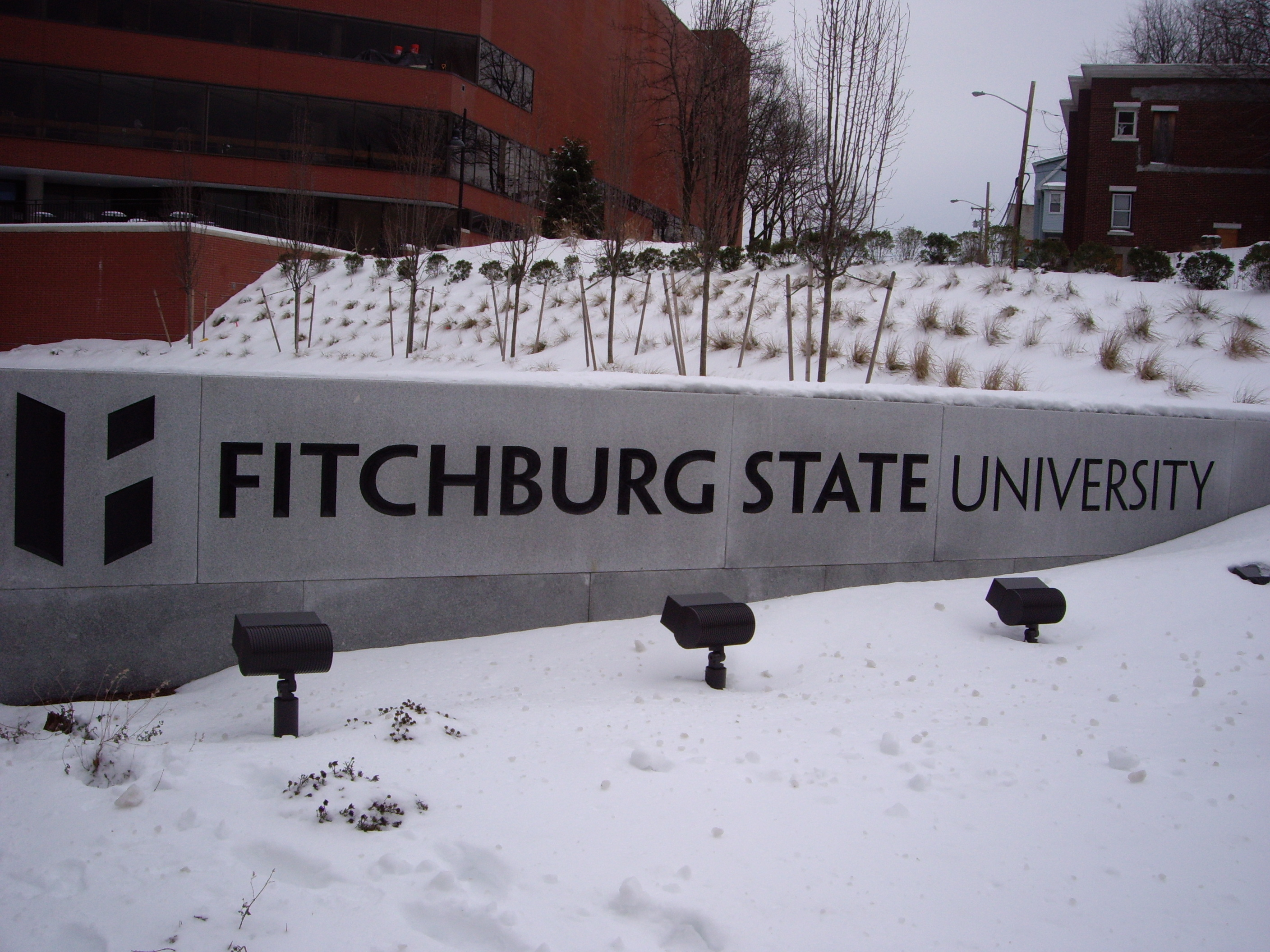
Fitchburg State University Entrance

Fitchburg State University offers 56 undergraduate majors and concentrations in 25 departments. The university also offers more than 40 graduate and certificate programs.

=== Accreditations and approvals ===
Fitchburg State University is accredited by the New England Commission of Higher Education (NECHE). Particular programs are also accredited by the Commission on Collegiate Nursing Education, the International Assembly for Collegiate Business Education, the Council for Standards in Human Service Education, and the National Council for Accreditation of Teacher Education.

Individual programs are approved by the Massachusetts Department of Education, the National Association of State Directors of Teacher Education and Certification, the Interstate Certification Compact of Educational Personnel, the State Board of Registration in Nursing, the Board of Higher Education, and the Commonwealth Honors Program.

== Music ensembles ==
The Fitchburg State University is home to several music ensembles, including Concert Band, Concert and Chamber Choirs, Jazz and Modern Band, Community Orchestra, and the Community Music Lesson Program.

== Student activities ==
Undergraduate demographics as of Fall 2023
Race and ethnicity	Total
White	62%
Hispanic	16%
Black	13%
Asian	3%
Two or more races	3%
Unknown	2%
International student	1%
Economic diversity
Low-income (Note: The percentage of students who received an income-based federal Pell grant intended for low-income students.)	34%
Affluent (Note: The percentage of students who are a part of the American middle class at the bare minimum.)	66%

=== Organizations ===
Fitchburg State University recognizes over 60 student clubs and organizations, including the student-run newspaper, The Point, the student-run radio station, WXPL (91.3 FM) and student-run Dance Club, currently the largest club on campus.

=== Greek life ===
Fitchburg State University is home to three fraternities and three sororities. Approximately 4–5% of undergraduate students are affiliated with fraternities and sororities recognized by the university. The recognized fraternities on campus are Sigma Pi, Alpha Phi Delta, and Sigma Tau Gamma, while the recognized sororities are Phi Sigma Sigma, Sigma Sigma Sigma, and Alpha Sigma Tau.

== Rankings ==
In their 2023 rankings, Fitchburg State was ranked tied at #85 of Regional Universities North by U.S. News & World Report.

== Athletics ==
=== University teams ===
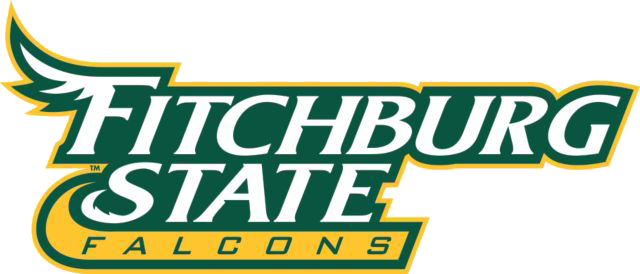
Fitchburg State Falcons wordmark

Fitchburg State athletics teams are nicknamed the Falcons. The university participates in NCAA Division III athletics program. It offers men's baseball, basketball, soccer, football, and ice hockey. Women's sports offered are basketball, soccer, softball, field hockey, lacrosse, and (as of 2017), volleyball. Cross country and track and field are offered for both men and women.

=== Intramural sports ===
Fitchburg State University also offers a selection of intramural sports each semester. These sports are only students on campus versus other students on campus. The chosen sports can differ from year to year. In the past, they have included rugby, basketball, dodgeball, flag football, floor hockey, kickball, soccer (indoor and outdoor), softball, swimming, ultimate frisbee, and volleyball.

== Notable alumni ==
- Leonard L. Amburgey, astronomer
- Michael Bavaro, filmmaker
- Ethan F. Becker, author
- Alice Burke, politician
- Lars Christiansen, politician
- William Constantino Jr., politician
- Robert Cormier, author
- Paul Coyne, producer
- Patricia Deegan, advocate
- Patrick O'Brien Demsey, actor
- Stephen DiNatale, politician
- Walt Dubzinski, football player
- Jonathan Egstad, software developer
- Jennifer Flanagan, politician
- Dean Fuller, ice hockey coach
- Denise Garlick, politician
- Joey Graceffa, actor (did not graduate)
- Robert A. Hall, politician
- Mike Kushmerek, politician
- Elaine Nicpon Marieb, anatomist
- Scott McGilvray, politician
- Priscilla McLean, composer
- E. J. Miller Laino, poet
- Lydia O'Leary, inventor
- Peter H. Reynolds, author
- R. A. Salvatore, author
- Jim Todd, basketball coach
- Merrick Henry, musician
^ Christian Hansen Jr., Politician and Police Officer
