= Bill Kangas =

American ice hockey coach

Current position
- Title: Head coach
- Team: Williams
- Conference: NESCAC

Biographical details
- Born: November 28, 1959 (age 66); Eveleth, Minnesota, USA
- Education: University of Vermont

Playing career
- 1978–1982: Vermont
- Position: Defense

Coaching career (HC unless noted)
- 1984–1989: Vermont (assistant)
- 1989–2017: Williams
- 2018–Present: Williams

Head coaching record
- Overall: 415–270–66 (.597)

William Kangas is an American ice hockey coach. He has been the head coach for Williams since 1989, recording more than 400 wins in that time.

== Career ==
Kangas got his start in college hockey as a player at Vermont. After graduating with a B.A. in zoology in 1982, Kangas returned to the team as an assistant in 1984 under new head coach Mike Gilligan. Kangas helped the team improve steadily in ECAC Hockey, reaching the conference championship game in 1989. That spring, Kangas was hired to replace long-time Williams coach Bill McCormick, who had helmed the team since 1954.

When Kangas took over, the Ephs had not had a winning season in seven years and that trend continued in his first season. In year two, however, Kangas led Williams to not only a winning mark, but their first ever postseason victory. Three years later, Williams won their first regular season title. The crown came just in time for the NESCAC, Williams' primary conference, to change their rules regarding national tournaments. Prior to 1994, the NESCAC did not allow member teams to participate in any national tournament. Beginning with the 1993–94 scholastic year, a NESCAC team could take part in one postseason tournament, either conference or national. With the title already clinched, Williams declined to play in the ECAC East Tournament in the hopes of receiving an NCAA bid. Unfortunately, Salem State, one of the team that Williams had tied with for the regular season title, went on to win the conference tournament. Because Salem State was not under the same restrictions as Williams, they were able to accept a bid to the NCAA Tournament and Williams was left by the wayside.

A similar situation happened four years later after the Ephs finished second in their conference to three-time defending NCAA champion Middlebury. Williams had one of the best marks in the regular season at 18–5–1 but were passed over in favor of Oswego State, who had a record of 16–11–2 but had won the SUNYAC regular season title and finished as the tournament runner-up.

Kangas' bad luck in this regard was rendered moot in 1999 when the NESCAC dropped the postseason restriction for its member schools, allowing them to compete on equal footing with other conferences. The same year, the NESCAC began sponsoring ice hockey as a sport and Williams joined with the eight other active teams as a founding member of a new conference. Williams played very well in the first season, finishing the year as the conference Runner-Up, but the team declined afterwards. The Ephs finished with a winning record in just three of the next eight years and did not win another postseason game until 2009. That season was a watershed for Williams, however, and the Ephs have been one of the best teams in their conference since. In the second decade of the 21st century, Williams finished with a winning record in every season under Kangas and were conference runners-up on three separate occasions. In 2016, Williams won a regular season title for the first time in 22 years and, unlike the last time, were able to convert it into an NCAA Tournament berth. With the drought over for the oldest Division III team, Williams won their first NCAA game, defeating Salem State 7–1.

After the following season Kangas took a year-long sabbatical, which was afforded to him since he was regarded as a regular faculty member, turning the team over to assistant Mike Monti. Kangas returned the following year and had Williams back atop the NESCAC in 2020. While the Ephs were passed over for an at-large bid that year, it proved academic as the COVID-19 pandemic forced the cancellation of the 2020 Tournament. Williams cancelled their 2020–21 for the same reason, but retained Kangas for their return in 2021.

== College head coaching record ==
Record table
Season	Team	Overall	Conference	Standing	Postseason
Williams Ephs (ECAC East) (1989–1999)
1989–90	Williams	8–12–2	3–10–1	12th	
1990–91	Williams	15–7–3	9–6–4	7th	ECAC East Semifinals
1991–92	Williams	10–11–2	8–11–2	10th	
1992–93	Williams	18–7–0	16–6–0	4th	ECAC East Semifinals
1993–94	Williams	17–5–0	13–4–0	T–1st	
1994–95	Williams	12–7–3	11–3–3	T–2nd	ECAC East Quarterfinals
1995–96	Williams	11–13–1	10–8–1	T–8th	ECAC East Quarterfinals
1996–97	Williams	16–8–1	14–4–1	T–3rd	ECAC East Quarterfinals
1997–98	Williams	18–5–1	16–2–1	2nd	
1998–99	Williams	18–7–2	12–4–1	4th	ECAC East Runner-Up
Williams:		143–82–15	112–58–14		
Williams Ephs (NESCAC) (1999–2017)
1999–00	Williams	17–7–3	12–3–2	T–3rd	NESCAC Runner-Up
2000–01	Williams	9–15–1	7–9–1	7th	NESCAC Quarterfinals
2001–02	Williams	14–9–2	12–5–2	5th	NESCAC Quarterfinals
2002–03	Williams	8–15–2	8–9–2	T–6th	NESCAC Quarterfinals
2003–04	Williams	12–9–3	11–6–1	5th	NESCAC Quarterfinals
2004–05	Williams	11–12–2	11–7–1	6th	NESCAC Quarterfinals
2005–06	Williams	14–7–3	13–3–3	2nd	NESCAC Quarterfinals
2006–07	Williams	8–14–2	8–9–2	7th	NESCAC Quarterfinals
2007–08	Williams	9–12–4	7–8–4	T–6th	NESCAC Quarterfinals
2008–09	Williams	15–9–2	12–5–2	3rd	NESCAC Semifinals
2009–10	Williams	15–6–3	13–5–1	3rd	NESCAC Quarterfinals
2010–11	Williams	16–8–3	11–6–2	2nd	NESCAC Runner-Up
2011–12	Williams	12–9–5	8–8–2	5th	NESCAC Semifinals
2012–13	Williams	17–7–3	12–4–2	2nd	NESCAC Runner-Up
2013–14	Williams	15–8–3	10–5–3	3rd	NESCAC Semifinals
2014–15	Williams	16–9–2	10–7–1	T–3rd	NESCAC Runner-Up
2015–16	Williams	19–6–2	14–2–2	1st	NCAA Quarterfinals
2016–17	Williams	14–9–3	10–5–3	4th	NESCAC Semifinals
Williams:		241–171–48	189–106–36		
Williams Ephs (NESCAC) (2018–Present)
2018–19	Williams	14–9–2	10–6–2	5th	NESCAC Quarterfinals
2019–20	Williams	17–8–1	13–5–0	1st	NESCAC Semifinals
Williams:		31–17–13	23–11–2		
Total:		415–270–66			
National champion Postseason invitational champion Conference regular season champion Conference regular season and conference tournament champion Division regular season champion Division regular season and conference tournament champion Conference tournament champion

== See also ==
- List of college men's ice hockey coaches with 400 wins
