= Peter Belisle =

American ice hockey coach

Current position
- Title: Head coach
- Team: Massachusetts–Boston
- Conference: NEHC

Biographical details
- Born: Manville, Rhode Island, US
- Education: University of Connecticut

Playing career
- 1991–1995: Connecticut
- Position: Forward

Coaching career (HC unless noted)
- 1996–1997: Holy Cross (asst.)
- 1997–2006: Connecticut (asst.)
- 2006–present: Massachusetts–Boston

Head coaching record
- Overall: 221–153–29 (.584)
- Tournaments: 2–1 (.667)

Accomplishments and honors

Championships
- 2016 NEHC champion 2016 NEHC tournament champion 2019 NEHC champion

Awards
- 2016 Edward Jeremiah Award

Peter Belisle is an American ice hockey coach and former player who was the NCAA Division III coach of the year in 2016.

== Career ==
Belisle was a four-year player with the ice hockey team at Connecticut during one of the program's best stretches. While he was there, the team went 71–25–12, made the conference postseason every year and won its first conference title (the program's only regular season championship as of 2022). After graduating with a degree in business administration, Belisle took a year off before embarking on a coaching career. His first job was as an assistant at Holy Cross, but that stint lasted just a year before he returned to his alma mater in the same role. During his second stay at Storrs, Belisle helped the Huskies transition to Division I and then win the program's first tournament championship in 2000. During this time, Belisle returned to class an earned a Master's degree.

During the 2005–06 season, Massachusetts–Boston had one of the worst performances in the history of college hockey. The Beacons didn't win any of their 26 games and scored a paltry 39 goals over the course of the year. It was the 5th-consecutive year of abysmal play for the Beacons and the team turned to Belisle to give them a fresh start. In his first season behind the bench, UMB won only 5 games but it was still more than they had been able to garner since 2000. By his second year, Belisle was able to get the team up to double-digit wins and then managed his first winning season in 2011. By the mid-teens the Beacons managed to post their first 20-win season in over 35 years. The following season, the program made its first NCAA Tournament appearance. Belisle led the team to the national semifinal that year and was the co-recipient of the Edward Jeremiah Award as the best coach at the Division III level. In the years since, UMB has continued to post winning records but they have yet to return to the national tournament.

== Statistics ==
=== Regular season and playoffs ===
| | | | Regular Season | | | | | Playoffs |
| Season | Team | League | GP | G | A | Pts | PIM | GP | G | A | Pts | PIM |
|---|---|---|---|---|---|---|---|---|---|---|---|---|
| 1991–92 | Connecticut | ECAC East | — | — | — | — | — | — | — | — | — | — |
| 1992–93 | Connecticut | ECAC East | — | — | — | — | — | — | — | — | — | — |
| 1993–94 | Connecticut | ECAC East | — | — | — | — | — | — | — | — | — | — |
| 1994–95 | Connecticut | ECAC East | — | — | — | — | — | — | — | — | — | — |
| NCAA totals | | | — | 36 | 42 | 78 | — | — | — | — | — | — |

== Head coaching record ==
Record table
| Season | Team | Overall | Conference | Standing | Postseason |
|---|---|---|---|---|---|
Massachusetts–Boston Beacons (ECAC East (D-III)) (2006–present)
| 2006–07 | Massachusetts–Boston | 5–20–1 | 3–16–0 | 8th | ECAC East Quarterfinals |
| 2007–08 | Massachusetts–Boston | 11–14–2 | 5–12–2 | 7th | ECAC East Semifinals |
| 2008–09 | Massachusetts–Boston | 10–16–2 | 4–14–1 | 8th | ECAC East Runner-Up |
| 2009–10 | Massachusetts–Boston | 10–13–2 | 6–11–2 | T–6th | ECAC East Quarterfinals |
| 2010–11 | Massachusetts–Boston | 15–11–0 | 10–9–0 | 3rd | ECAC East Quarterfinals |
| 2011–12 | Massachusetts–Boston | 13–10–3 | 9–8–1 | 5th | ECAC East Semifinals |
| 2012–13 | Massachusetts–Boston | 19–6–2 | 11–5–2 | 2nd | ECAC East Semifinals |
| 2013–14 | Massachusetts–Boston | 17–6–4 | 9–5–4 | 3rd | ECAC East Semifinals |
| 2014–15 | Massachusetts–Boston | 22–4–1 | 16–2–0 | 2nd | ECAC East Semifinals |
| Massachusetts–Boston: | | 122–100–17 | 73–82–12 | | |
Massachusetts–Boston Beacons (NEHC) (2006–present)
| 2015–16 | Massachusetts–Boston | 23–5–3 | 14–2–2 | 1st | NCAA National Semifinal |
| 2016–17 | Massachusetts–Boston | 12–11–3 | 7–9–2 | 6th | NEHC Quarterfinals |
| 2017–18 | Massachusetts–Boston | 17–10–0 | 11–7–0 | 4th | NEHC Semifinals |
| 2018–19 | Massachusetts–Boston | 19–8–1 | 14–3–1 | 1st | NEHC Semifinals |
| 2019–20 | Massachusetts–Boston | 14–11–1 | 10–7–1 | 5th | NEHC Semifinals |
| 2021–22 | Massachusetts–Boston | 14–8–4 | 10–4–4 | T–3rd | NEHC Quarterfinals |
| Massachusetts–Boston: | | 99–53–12 | 66–32–10 | | |
| Total: | | 221–153–29 | | | |
National champion Postseason invitational champion Conference regular season champion Conference regular season and conference tournament champion Division regular season champion Division regular season and conference tournament champion Conference tournament champion

Awards and achievements
| Preceded by Jack Arena | Edward Jeremiah Award; 2015–16 (with Chris Schultz) | Succeeded by Mike McShane |
