= MCHA tournament =

Division III college ice hockey tournament

Midwest Collegiate Hockey Association tournament
- Conference hockey championship
- Sport: Ice hockey
- Conference: MCHA
- Format: Single-elimination
- Played: 1999–2013

The Midwest Collegiate Hockey Association tournament was a Division III college ice hockey tournament held annually to determine the MCHA champion. The tournament operated from the inception of the conference in 1999 to its absorption by the NCHA in 2013.

== History ==
The MCHA tournament was held every year that the MCHA existed and was discontinued when the NCHA absorbed the MCHA. Originally the tournament was an entirely single-elimination format, but after the league expanded to 6 teams in 2004–05, each round was changed to point system; two teams would play two games against one another with the first to three points being declared the winner (two points for a win, one point for a tie). After two games, if both teams remained tied, a 20-minute mini-game was played to determine which team would advance. In accordance with NCAA rules, mini-games did not count for a team's standings or statistics and were only used to decide which team progressed.

== 1999 ==
Seed	School	Record
1	Findlay	11–0–0
2	Marian	12–3–0
3	MSOE	4–7–2
4	Northland	2–8–2

Semifinals; February 26
1	Findlay	19
4	Northland	2
2	Marian	4
3	MSOE	1

Championship; February 27
1	Findlay	9
2	Marian	1
Third-Place
3	MSOE	4
4	Northland	6

Note: * denotes overtime period(s)

== 2000 ==
Seed	School	Record
1	Minnesota–Crockston	10–0–0
2	Marian	12–2–0
3	MSOE	8–6–0
4	Northland	2–13–1

Semifinals; February 25
1	Minnesota–Crockston	6
4	Northland	4
2	Marian	3
3	MSOE	2

Championship; February 26
1	Minnesota–Crockston	4
2	Marian	3
Third-Place
3	MSOE	9
4	Northland	4

Note: * denotes overtime period(s)

== 2001 ==
Seed	School	Record
1	Minnesota–Crockston	11–0–1
2	Marian	11–2–1
3	Northland	6–10–0
4	Lawrence	3–10–1

Semifinals; February 23
1	Minnesota–Crockston	7
4	Lawrence	3
2	Marian	7*
3	Northland	6

Championship; February 24
1	Minnesota–Crockston	1
2	Marian	5
Third-Place
3	Northland	3
4	Lawrence	5

Note: * denotes overtime period(s)

== 2002 ==
Seed	School	Record
1	Marian	16–0–0
2	MSOE	8–8–0
3	Minnesota–Crockston	6–10–0
4	Lawrence	6–10–0
5	Northland	4–12–0

Qualifier; February 22
4	Lawrence	3
5	Northland	2

Semifinals; February 23
1	Marian	4
4	Lawrence	1
2	MSOE	1
3	Minnesota–Crockston	2**

Championship; February 24
1	Marian	7
3	Minnesota–Crockston	3
Third-Place
2	MSOE	3
4	Lawrence	5*

Note: * denotes overtime period(s)

== 2003 ==
Seed	School	Record
1	Minnesota–Crockston	10–3–3
2	Marian	10–4–2
3	Lawrence	10–6–0
4	MSOE	4–10–2
5	Northland	2–13–1

Qualifier; February 21
4	MSOE	6
5	Northland	0

Semifinals; February 22
1	Minnesota–Crockston	3
4	MSOE	2
2	Marian	3*
3	Lawrence	2

Championship; February 23
1	Minnesota–Crockston	2
2	Marian	1
Third-Place
3	Lawrence	2*
4	MSOE	1

Note: * denotes overtime period(s)

== 2004 ==
Seed	School	Record
1	Marian	14–2–0
2	Minnesota–Crockston	10–5–1
3	MSOE	9–7–0
4	Lawrence	3–12–1
5	Northland	2–12–2

Note: As the top seed, Marian served as host for the entire tournament.

Qualifier; February 27
4	Lawrence	5
5	Northland	4

Semifinals; February 28
1	Marian	5
4	Lawrence	1
2	Minnesota–Crockston	4
3	MSOE	3

Championship; February 29
1	Marian	0
2	Minnesota–Crockston	3
Third-Place
3	MSOE	3
4	Lawrence	2

Note: * denotes overtime period(s)

== 2005 ==
Seed	School	Record	Seed	School	Record
1	MSOE	13–3–0	4	Finlandia	7–8–1
2	Lawrence	9–7–0	5	Marian	7–8–1
3	Minnesota–Crockston	9–7–0	6	Northland	2–14–0

First Round; February 11–13
3	Minnesota–Crockston	6	1	-
6	Northland	2	0	-
4	Finlandia	4*	2	0
5	Marian	3	4	3

Semifinals; February 18–19
1	MSOE	3	0	3
5	Marian	1	4	0
2	Lawrence	3	4	0
3	Minnesota–Crockston	2	5*	1*

Championship; February 25–26
1	MSOE	3	4*	-
3	Minnesota–Crockston	2	3	-

Note: * denotes overtime period(s)
Mini games in italics

== 2006 ==
Seed	School	Record	Seed	School	Record
1	MSOE	17–2–1	4	Lawrence	7–9–4
2	Marian	13–6–1	5	Minnesota–Crockston	6–13–1
3	Finlandia	9–8–3	6	Northland	3–17–0

Note: Lawrence served as host for the entire tournament.

Quarterfinals; March 3
3	Finlandia	6
6	Northland	2
4	Lawrence	6
5	Minnesota–Crockston	4

Semifinals; March 4
1	MSOE	8
4	Lawrence	1
2	Marian	3*
3	Finlandia	2

Championship; March 5
1	MSOE	5
2	Marian	2

Note: * denotes overtime period(s)

== 2007 ==
Seed	School	Record	Seed	School	Record
1	MSOE	16–2–2	4	Lawrence	8–11–1
2	Finlandia	15–5–0	5	Minnesota–Crockston	5–13–2
3	Marian	12–6–2	6	Northland	0–19–1

Note: Finlandia served as host for the Semifinal and Championship rounds.

Quarterfinals; February 23–24
3	Marian	9	7	-
6	Northland	0	1	-
4	Lawrence	5	2*	-
5	Minnesota–Crockston	3	2	-

Semifinals; March 3
1	MSOE	4
4	Lawrence	0
2	Finlandia	6
3	Marian	3

Championship; March 4
1	MSOE	3
2	Finlandia	4
Third place
3	Marian	2
4	Lawrence	4

Note: * denotes overtime period(s)

== 2008 ==
Seed	School	Record	Seed	School	Record
1	Adrian	19–1–0	5	Lawrence	10–9–1
2	Marian	14–5–1	6	Minnesota–Crockston	5–15–0
3	Finlandia	14–6–0	7	Northland	4–16–0
4	MSOE	11–9–0	8	Concordia (WI)	2–18–0

Note: MSOE served as host for the Semifinal and Championship rounds.

Quarterfinals; February 22–24
1	Adrian	8	9	-
8	Concordia (WI)	0	1	-
2	Marian	3*	3	-
6	Minnesota–Crockston	2	1	-
(Pairings are reseeded after the first round)
3	Finlandia	5	3	-
7	Northland	1	1	-
4	MSOE	3	4	-
5	Lawrence	1	2	-

Semifinals; March 1
1	Adrian	4
4	MSOE	0
2	Marian	2
3	Finlandia	4

Championship; March 2
1	Adrian	1*
3	Finlandia	0

Note: * denotes overtime period(s)

== 2009 ==
Seed	School	Record	Seed	School	Record
1	Adrian	20–0–0	5	Finlandia	10–8–2
2	Lawrence	14–5–1	6	Minnesota–Crockston	5–15–0
3	MSOE	12–7–1	7	Concordia (WI)	4–16–0
4	Marian	11–8–1	8	Northland	1–18–1

Note: Adrian served as host for the Semifinal and Championship rounds.

Quarterfinals; February 20–21
1	Adrian	10	8	-
8	Northland	1	2	-
2	Lawrence	4	5	-
7	Concordia (WI)	0	3	-
(Pairings are reseeded after the first round)
3	MSOE	1	2	2
6	Minnesota–Crockston	4	1	1
4	Marian	5	4	-
5	Finlandia	3	3	-

Semifinals; February 28
1	Adrian	8
4	Marian	3
2	Lawrence	2
3	MSOE	3

Championship; March 1
1	Adrian	7
3	MSOE	1

Note: * denotes overtime period(s)

== 2010 ==
Seed	School	Record	Seed	School	Record
S1 (1)	Adrian	20–0–0	N1 (2)	Marian	18–2–0
S2	MSOE	12–7–1	N2	Lawrence	7–11–2
S3	Lake Forest	8–10–2	N3	Northland	5–14–1

Note: Adrian served as host for the Semifinal and Championship rounds.

First Round; February 26–28
N2	Lawrence	5	5	–
N3	Northland	1	3	–
S2	MSOE	6	7	1
S3	Lake Forest	7*	3	2*

Semifinals; March 5
S1	Adrian	3
N2	Lawrence	2
N1	Marian	4
S3	Lake Forest	3

Championship; March 6
S1	Adrian	3
N1	Marian	2

Note: * denotes overtime period(s)
Mini games in italics

== 2011 ==
Seed	School	Record	Seed	School	Record
S1 (1)	Adrian	18–1–1	N1 (2)	Marian	15–5–0
S2	MSOE	16–3–1	N2	Lawrence	10–10–0
S3	Lake Forest	5–14–1	N3	Northland	8–10–2

Note: Adrian served as host for the Semifinal and Championship rounds.

First Round; February 25–27
N2	Lawrence	2	3	–
N3	Northland	1	1	–
S2	MSOE	6	6	–
S3	Lake Forest	1	3	–

Semifinals; March 4
S1	Adrian	9
N2	Lawrence	2
N1	Marian	9
S2	MSOE	2

Championship; March 5
S1	Adrian	5
N1	Marian	0

Note: * denotes overtime period(s)
Mini games in italics

== 2012 ==
Seed	School	Record	Seed	School	Record
S1 (1)	Adrian	17–2–1	N1 (2)	Marian	12–5–3
S2	MSOE	16–3–1	N2	Lawrence	11–6–3
S3	Lake Forest	4–16–0	N3	Finlandia	7–13–0

Note: Adrian served as host for the Semifinal and Championship rounds.

First Round; February 24–26
N2	Lawrence	5	2*	–
N3	Finlandia	1	2	–
S2	MSOE	7	4	1**
S3	Lake Forest	2	6	0

Semifinals; March 3
S1	Adrian	2
N2	Lawrence	1
N1	Marian	2
S2	MSOE	3*

Championship; March 4
S1	Adrian	3
S2	MSOE	4*

Note: * denotes overtime period(s)
Mini games in italics

== 2013 ==
Seed	School	Record	Seed	School	Record
S1 (1)	Adrian	17–0–3	N1 (2)	Marian	12–8–0
S2	MSOE	12–6–2	N2	Lawrence	6–11–3
S3	Lake Forest	6–10–4	N3	Northland	7–13–0

Note: Adrian served as host for the Semifinal and Championship rounds.

First Round; February 22–24
N2	Lawrence	3	2	0
N3	Northland	0	5	1
S2	MSOE	3	0	1
S3	Lake Forest	2	2	0

Semifinals; March 1
S1	Adrian	8
N3	Northland	1
N1	Marian	0
S2	MSOE	1

Championship; March 2
S1	Adrian	4
S2	MSOE	1

Note: * denotes overtime period(s)
Mini games in italics

== See also ==
- NCHA Men's Tournament
