= NESCAC men's ice hockey tournament =

New England Small College Athletic Conference men's tournament
- Conference hockey championship
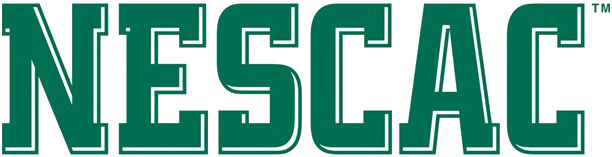
- Sport: Ice hockey
- Conference: NESCAC
- Format: Single-elimination
- Played: 2000–Present
- Official website: nescac.com/mens-ice-hockey

== History ==
The NESCAC tournament began in 2000 after the nine NESCAC left ECAC East to form the ice hockey division for their primary conference. The tournament has been held annually ever since with the winner receiving a bid to the Division III National Tournament. The 2021 tournament was cancelled due to the COVID-19 pandemic.

== 2000 ==
Seed	School	Record	Seed	School	Record
1	Middlebury	14–2–1	5	Amherst	11–4–2
2	Colby	14–3–0	6	Hamilton	11–5–1
3	Bowdoin	12–3–2	7	Wesleyan	5–9–3
4	Williams	12–3–2	8	-	-

Note: Middlebury served as host for the Semifinal and Championship rounds.

First Round; February 26
1	Middlebury	-
-	bye	-
2	Colby	4
7	Wesleyan	2
3	Bowdoin	4
6	Hamilton	5*
4	Williams	2
5	Amherst	1

Semifinals; March 3
1	Middlebury	5
6	Hamilton	2
2	Colby	1
4	Williams	6

Championship; March 4
1	Middlebury	3*
4	Williams	2

Note: * denotes overtime period(s)

== 2001 ==
Seed	School	Record	Seed	School	Record
1	Middlebury	16–1–0	5	Bowdoin	11–6–0
2	Amherst	12–2–3	6	Hamilton	10–7–0
3	Colby	12–4–1	7	Williams	7–9–1
4	Trinity	12–4–1	8	-	-

Note: Middlebury served as host for the Semifinal and Championship rounds.

First Round; February 24
1	Middlebury	-
-	bye	-
2	Amherst	3
7	Williams	0
3	Colby	0
6	Hamilton	4
4	Trinity	3
5	Bowdoin	4*

Semifinals; March 2
1	Middlebury	4
6	Hamilton	2
2	Amherst	3
5	Bowdoin	0

Championship; March 3
1	Middlebury	4*
2	Amherst	3

Note: * denotes overtime period(s)

== 2002 ==
Seed	School	Record	Seed	School	Record
1	Middlebury	18–0–1	5	Williams	12–5–2
2	Bowdoin	14–2–3	6	Colby	11–5–3
3	Hamilton	13–5–1	7	Amherst	6–9–4
4	Trinity	13–5–1	8	-	-

Note: Middlebury served as host for the Semifinal and Championship rounds.

First Round; February 23
1	Middlebury	-
-	bye	-
2	Bowdoin	3
7	Amherst	2
3	Hamilton	1
6	Colby	5
4	Trinity	4
5	Williams	1

Semifinals; March 2
1	Middlebury	4
6	Colby	2
2	Bowdoin	2
4	Trinity	3*

Championship; March 3
1	Middlebury	3
4	Trinity	2

Note: * denotes overtime period(s)

== 2003 ==
Seed	School	Record	Seed	School	Record
1	Middlebury	16–1–2	5	Hamilton	10–7–2
2	Trinity	15–3–1	6	Amherst	7–8–4
3	Colby	14–4–1	7	Williams	8–9–2
4	Bowdoin	11–3–5	8	Tufts	7–10–2

Note: Middlebury served as host for the Semifinal and Championship rounds.

Quarterfinals; March 1
1	Middlebury	7
8	Tufts	1
2	Trinity	3*
7	Williams	2
3	Colby	11
6	Amherst	0
4	Bowdoin	3
5	Hamilton	6

Semifinals; March 8
1	Middlebury	5
5	Hamilton	3
2	Trinity	3*
3	Colby	2

Championship; March 9
1	Middlebury	2
2	Trinity	4

Note: * denotes overtime period(s)

== 2004 ==
Seed	School	Record	Seed	School	Record
1	Middlebury	15–3–0	5	Williams	11–6–1
2	Trinity	12–5–1	6	Hamilton	10–6–2
3	Bowdoin	12–6–0	7	Amherst	6–10–2
4	Colby	10–4–4	8	Tufts	4–13–1

Note: Middlebury served as host for the Semifinal and Championship rounds.

Quarterfinals; February 28
1	Middlebury	7
8	Tufts	1
2	Trinity	3
7	Amherst	0
3	Bowdoin	0
6	Hamilton	4
4	Colby	3
5	Williams	1

Semifinals; March 6
1	Middlebury	3
6	Hamilton	1
2	Trinity	4
3	Colby	2

Championship; March 7
1	Middlebury	6
2	Trinity	2

Note: * denotes overtime period(s) | class="col-break col-break-2" |

== 2005 ==
Seed	School	Record	Seed	School	Record
1	Trinity	15–2–2	5	Amherst	11–6–2
2	Middlebury	13–4–2	6	Williams	11–7–1
3	Colby	12–6–1	7	Hamilton	8–8–3
4	Bowdoin	11–5–3	8	Tufts	8–10–1

Note: Trinity served as host for the Semifinal and Championship rounds.

Quarterfinals; February 26
1	Trinity	9
8	Tufts	2
2	Middlebury	3
7	Hamilton	0
3	Colby	7
6	Williams	0
4	Bowdoin	6
5	Amherst	4

Semifinals; March 5
1	Trinity	2
4	Bowdoin	3
2	Middlebury	4
3	Colby	1

Championship; March 6
4	Bowdoin	2
2	Middlebury	3

Note: * denotes overtime period(s)

== 2006 ==
Seed	School	Record	Seed	School	Record
1	Middlebury	16–2–1	5	Trinity	9–7–3
2	Williams	13–3–3	6	Amherst	9–9–1
3	Bowdoin	10–6–3	7	Hamilton	8–9–2
4	Colby	11–7–1	8	Wesleyan	6–9–4

Note: Middlebury served as host for the Semifinal and Championship rounds.

Quarterfinals; February 25
1	Middlebury	7
8	Wesleyan	0
2	Williams	5
7	Hamilton	9
3	Bowdoin	5
6	Amherst	1
4	Colby	2
5	Trinity	3*

Semifinals; March 3
1	Middlebury	9
7	Hamilton	2
3	Bowdoin	3
5	Trinity	1

Championship; March 4
1	Middlebury	3
3	Bowdoin	1

Note: * denotes overtime period(s)

== 2007 ==
Seed	School	Record	Seed	School	Record
1	Bowdoin	11–6–2	5	Amherst	10–8–1
2	Middlebury	11–6–2	6	Connecticut College	9–9–1
3	Colby	11–7–1	7	Williams	8–9–2
4	Wesleyan	9–6–4	8	Trinity	6–10–3

Note: Bowdoin served as host for the Semifinal and Championship rounds.

Quarterfinals; February 24
1	Bowdoin	7
8	Trinity	3
2	Middlebury	5
7	Williams	1
3	Colby	5
6	Connecticut College	1
4	Wesleyan	0
5	Amherst	2

Semifinals; March 3
1	Bowdoin	6
5	Amherst	3
2	Middlebury	4
3	Colby	3

Championship; March 4
1	Bowdoin	2
2	Middlebury	4

Note: * denotes overtime period(s)

== 2008 ==
Seed	School	Record	Seed	School	Record
1	Colby	13–5–1	5	Connecticut College	9–8–2
2	Middlebury	12–5–2	6	Trinity	8–9–2
3	Bowdoin	13–6–0	7	Williams	7–8–4
4	Amherst	11–6–2	8	Wesleyan	6–10–3

Note: Colby served as host for the Semifinal and Championship rounds.

Quarterfinals; March 1
1	Colby	4
8	Wesleyan	1
2	Middlebury	6
7	Williams	0
3	Bowdoin	2
6	Trinity	5
4	Amherst	3*
5	Connecticut College	2

Semifinals; March 8
1	Colby	1
6	Trinity	2
2	Middlebury	2
4	Amherst	1

Championship; March 9
6	Trinity	3*
2	Middlebury	2

Note: * denotes overtime period(s)

== 2009 ==
Seed	School	Record	Seed	School	Record
1	Amherst	16–2–1	5	Connecticut College	9–7–3
2	Middlebury	14–4–1	6	Bowdoin	8–9–2
3	Williams	12–5–2	7	Hamilton	8–11–0
4	Trinity	12–7–0	8	Tufts	7–10–2

Note: Amherst served as host for the Semifinal and Championship rounds.

Quarterfinals; February 28
1	Amherst	4
8	Tufts	1
2	Middlebury	6
7	Hamilton	2
3	Williams	3*
6	Bowdoin	2
4	Trinity	3
5	Connecticut College	1

Semifinals; March 6
1	Amherst	3
4	Trinity	0
2	Middlebury	4
3	Williams	1

Championship; March 7
1	Amherst	5
2	Middlebury	2

Note: * denotes overtime period(s)

== 2010 ==
Seed	School	Record	Seed	School	Record
1	Bowdoin	14–4–1	5	Trinity	11–6–2
2	Middlebury	12–3–4	6	Hamilton	11–7–1
3	Williams	13–5–1	7	Tufts	8–8–3
4	Amherst	11–4–4	8	Colby	7–8–4

Note: Bowdoin served as host for the Semifinal and Championship rounds.

Quarterfinals; February 27
1	Bowdoin	2*
8	Colby	1
2	Middlebury	6
7	Tufts	2
3	Williams	1
6	Hamilton	2*
4	Amherst	1
5	Trinity	2*

Semifinals; March 6
1	Bowdoin	6
6	Hamilton	2
2	Middlebury	4
5	Trinity	2

Championship; March 7
1	Bowdoin	2
2	Middlebury	3

Note: * denotes overtime period(s)

== 2011 ==
Seed	School	Record	Seed	School	Record
1	Hamilton	11–4–4	5	Bowdoin	11–7–1
2	Williams	11–6–2	6	Colby	10–7–2
3	Middlebury	9–5–5	7	Trinity	9–8–2
4	Amherst	10–6–3	8	Wesleyan	8–10–1

Note: Williams served as host for the Semifinal and Championship rounds.

Quarterfinals; February 27
1	Hamilton	2
8	Wesleyan	5
2	Williams	4
7	Trinity	3
3	Middlebury	1
6	Colby	2
4	Amherst	3
5	Bowdoin	4*

Semifinals; March 6
2	Williams	3*
8	Wesleyan	2
5	Bowdoin	3
6	Colby	1

Championship; March 7
2	Williams	2
5	Bowdoin	5

Note: * denotes overtime period(s)

== 2012 ==
Seed	School	Record	Seed	School	Record
1	Amherst	17–1–0	5	Williams	8–8–2
2	Bowdoin	12–3–3	6	Wesleyan	7–9–2
3	Middlebury	11–6–1	7	Trinity	6–10–2
4	Tufts	9–8–1	8	Hamilton	4–12–2

Note: Amherst served as host for the Semifinal and Championship rounds.

Quarterfinals; February 25
1	Amherst	6
8	Hamilton	0
2	Bowdoin	2
7	Trinity	1
3	Middlebury	2
6	Wesleyan	1
4	Tufts	3
5	Williams	4*

Semifinals; March 3
1	Amherst	2
5	Williams	1
2	Bowdoin	3
3	Middlebury	6

Championship; March 4
1	Amherst	4
2	Middlebury	3

Note: * denotes overtime period(s)

== 2013 ==
Seed	School	Record	Seed	School	Record
1	Bowdoin	13–3–2	5	Middlebury	11–5–2
2	Williams	12–4–2	6	Wesleyan	6–8–4
3	Trinity	11–4–3	7	Colby	5–11–2
4	Amherst	11–5–2	8	Hamilton	4–12–2

Note: Bowdoin served as host for the Semifinal and Championship rounds.

Quarterfinals; February 23
1	Bowdoin	5
8	Hamilton	3
2	Williams	2
7	Colby	1
3	Trinity	5*
6	Wesleyan	4
4	Amherst	3
5	Middlebury	4

Semifinals; March 2
1	Bowdoin	4
5	Middlebury	2
2	Williams	4
3	Trinity	2

Championship; March 3
1	Bowdoin	2
2	Williams	1

Note: * denotes overtime period(s)

== 2014 ==
Seed	School	Record	Seed	School	Record
1	Trinity	15–3–0	5	Bowdoin	9–8–1
2	Amherst	12–4–2	6	Colby	8–9–1
3	Williams	10–5–3	7	Connecticut College	8–9–1
4	Middlebury	9–7–2	8	Wesleyan	6–11–1

Note: Trinity served as host for the Semifinal and Championship rounds.

Quarterfinals; March 1
1	Trinity	9
8	Wesleyan	1
2	Amherst	4
7	Connecticut College	2
3	Williams	7
6	Colby	3
4	Middlebury	3
5	Bowdoin	6

Semifinals; March 8
1	Trinity	4
5	Bowdoin	5
2	Amherst	3
3	Williams	1

Championship; March 9
5	Bowdoin	3**
2	Amherst	2

Note: * denotes overtime period(s)

== 2015 ==
Seed	School	Record	Seed	School	Record
1	Trinity	16–1–1	5	Bowdoin	8–7–3
2	Amherst	14–4–0	6	Hamilton	7–7–4
3	Connecticut College	10–7–1	7	Middlebury	7–8–3
4	Williams	10–7–1	8	Tufts	5–11–2

Note: Amherst served as host for the Semifinal and Championship rounds.

Quarterfinals; February 28
1	Trinity	1
8	Tufts	2
2	Amherst	3
7	Middlebury	0
3	Connecticut College	4*
6	Hamilton	3
4	Williams	4*
5	Bowdoin	3

Semifinals; March 7
2	Amherst	3
8	Tufts	2
3	Connecticut College	2
4	Williams	4

Championship; March 8
2	Amherst	1
4	Williams	0

Note: * denotes overtime period(s)

== 2016 ==
Seed	School	Record	Seed	School	Record
1	Williams	14–2–2	5	Middlebury	6–5–7
2	Trinity	14–4–0	6	Amherst	7–8–3
3	Bowdoin	9–5–4	7	Colby	6–9–3
4	Hamilton	8–6–4	8	Tufts	5–8–5

Note: Trinity served as host for the Semifinal and Championship rounds.

Quarterfinals; February 27
1	Williams	1
8	Tufts	2
2	Trinity	3
7	Colby	1
3	Bowdoin	5
6	Amherst	8
4	Hamilton	1
5	Middlebury	2

Semifinals; March 5
2	Trinity	4
8	Tufts	3
5	Middlebury	2
6	Amherst	4

Championship; March 6
2	Trinity	5
6	Amherst	1

Note: * denotes overtime period(s)

== 2017 ==
Seed	School	Record	Seed	School	Record
1	Hamilton	11–3–4	5	Amherst	9–6–3
2	Colby	11–4–3	6	Tufts	9–8–1
3	Trinity	11–5–2	7	Wesleyan	7–7–4
4	Williams	10–5–3	8	Bowdoin	5–12–1

Note: Hamilton served as host for the Semifinal and Championship rounds.

Quarterfinals; February 25
1	Hamilton	4
8	Bowdoin	2
2	Colby	4
7	Wesleyan	5
3	Trinity	4
6	Tufts	1
4	Williams	2
5	Amherst	1

Semifinals; March 4
1	Hamilton	5
7	Wesleyan	4
3	Trinity	4
4	Williams	2

Championship; March 5
1	Hamilton	2
3	Trinity	3*

Note: * denotes overtime period(s)

== 2018 ==
Seed	School	Record	Seed	School	Record
1	Trinity	14–3–1	5	Wesleyan	8–6–4
2	Connecticut College	9–5–4	6	Colby	9–7–2
3	Amherst	8–5–5	7	Williams	9–8–1
4	Hamilton	9–6–3	8	Tufts	4–11–3

Note: Trinity served as host for the Semifinal and Championship rounds.

Quarterfinals; February 24
1	Trinity	2
8	Tufts	0
2	Connecticut College	2
7	Williams	4
3	Amherst	1
6	Colby	5
4	Hamilton	1
5	Wesleyan	2

Semifinals; March 3
1	Trinity	5
7	Williams	2
5	Wesleyan	1
6	Colby	5

Championship; March 4
1	Trinity	1
6	Colby	4

Note: * denotes overtime period(s)

== 2019 ==
Seed	School	Record	Seed	School	Record
1	Trinity	12–2–4	5	Williams	10–6–2
2	Wesleyan	13–3–2	6	Colby	7–7–4
3	Amherst	10–4–4	7	Middlebury	5–9–4
4	Hamilton	10–5–3	8	Tufts	3–12–3

Note: Trinity served as host for the Semifinal and Championship rounds.

Quarterfinals; February 23
1	Trinity	3
8	Tufts	0
2	Wesleyan	4
7	Middlebury	1
3	Amherst	5
6	Colby	0
4	Hamilton	4*
5	Williams	3

Semifinals; March 2
1	Trinity	2*
4	Hamilton	1
2	Wesleyan	0
3	Amherst	1**

Championship; March 3
1	Trinity	3*
3	Amherst	2

Note: * denotes overtime period(s)

== 2020 ==
Seed	School	Record	Seed	School	Record
1	Williams	13–5–0	5	Wesleyan	8–9–1
2	Trinity	12–5–1	6	Bowdoin	8–9–1
3	Hamilton	10–6–2	7	Amherst	7–8–3
4	Middlebury	8–7–3	8	Connecticut College	7–9–2

Note: Williams served as host for the Semifinal and Championship rounds.

Quarterfinals; February 29
1	Williams	3
8	Connecticut College	2
2	Trinity	5
7	Amherst	3
3	Hamilton	5
6	Bowdoin	1
4	Middlebury	2
5	Wesleyan	4

Semifinals; March 7
1	Williams	2
5	Wesleyan	3*
2	Trinity	3
3	Hamilton	2

Championship; March 8
5	Wesleyan	7
2	Trinity	2

Note: * denotes overtime period(s)

== 2022 ==
Seed	School	Record	Seed	School	Record
1	Colby	11–1–4–0–2	6	Amherst	8–0–7–2–1
2	Trinity	10–2–4–1–1	7	Bowdoin	4–4–5–2–3
3	Williams	9–1–7–0–1	8	Tufts	4–1–8–3–2
4	Wesleyan	7–1–5–2–3	9	Middlebury	3–2–9–2–2
5	Hamilton	6–3–5–3–1	10	Connecticut College	3–1–11–1–2

Note: Colby served as host for the Semifinal and Championship rounds.

First Round; February 25
8	Tufts	4
9	Middlebury	1
7	Bowdoin	1
10	Connecticut College	4

Quarterfinals; February 26–27
1	Colby	5
8	Tufts	1
4	Wesleyan	2
5	Hamilton	3
3	Williams	3
6	Amherst	1
2	Trinity	5
10	Connecticut College	0

Semifinals; March 5
1	Colby	6
5	Hamilton	4
3	Williams	0
2	Trinity	4

Championship; March 6
1	Colby	1
2	Trinity	4

Note: * denotes overtime period(s)

== 2023 ==
Seed	School	Record	Seed	School	Record
1	Wesleyan	10–1–1–3–3	5	Colby	9–1–6–1–1
2	Trinity	12–1–4–0–1	6	Tufts	6–1–9–1–1
3	Amherst	10–3–3–0–2	7	Bowdoin	6–0–9–0–3
4	Hamilton	10–1–4–1–2	8	Williams	5–0–11–0–2

Note: Amherst served as host for the Semifinal and Championship rounds.

Quarterfinals; February 25
1	Wesleyan	3
8	Williams	4
2	Trinity	1
7	Bowdoin	2*
3	Amherst	3*
6	Tufts	2
4	Hamilton	2
5	Colby	3*

Semifinals; March 4
3	Amherst	0
8	Williams	1*
5	Colby	1
7	Bowdoin	3

Championship; March 5
8	Williams	2
7	Bowdoin	3*

Note: * denotes overtime period(s)

== 2024 ==
Seed	School	Record	Seed	School	Record
1	Trinity	15–1–1–0–1	5	Amherst	8–1–8–0–1
2	Bowdoin	8–2–3–1–4	6	Connecticut College	6–1–9–2–0
3	Tufts	9–0–3–4–2	7	Middlebury	4–1–8–2–3
4	Hamilton	10–1–6–0–1	8	Colby	4–1–9–0–4

Note: Trinity served as host for the Semifinal and Championship rounds.

Quarterfinals; February 24
1	Trinity	2
8	Colby	1
2	Bowdoin	1
7	Middlebury	5
3	Tufts	5
6	Connecticut College	3
4	Hamilton	4
5	Amherst	3

Semifinals; March 2
1	Trinity	5
7	Middlebury	2
3	Tufts	1
4	Hamilton	0

Championship; March 3
1	Trinity	4
3	Tufts	0

Note: * denotes overtime period(s)

== 2025 ==
Seed	School	Record	Seed	School	Record
1	Hamilton	13–4–1–1–0–0	5	Tufts	8–10–0–0–0–2
2	Trinity	12–4–2–1–1–0	6	Amherst	8–8–2–1–1–0
3	Colby	8–5–5–1–2–0	7	Middlebury	8–9–1–0–0–0
4	Bowdoin	7–8–3–3–1–1	8	Connecticut College	7–10–1–1–0–0

Quarterfinals; March 1
1	Hamilton	5
8	Connecticut College	2
2	Trinity	0
7	Middlebury	1
3	Colby	3**
6	Amherst	2
4	Bowdoin	1
5	Tufts	2*

Semifinals; March 8
1	Hamilton	3**
7	Middlebury	2
3	Colby	2
5	Tufts	6

Championship; March 9
1	Hamilton	3
3	Tufts	0

Note: * denotes overtime period(s)

== 2026 ==
Seed	School	Record	Seed	School	Record
1	Hamilton	14–3–1–3–1–1	5	Wesleyan	8–10–0–0–1–0
2	Bowdoin	13–4–1–2–0–0	6	Williams	8–10–0–2–2–0
3	Tufts	9–9–0–0–3–0	7	Amherst	7–10–1–0–0–0
4	Middlebury	9–7–2–1–0–0	8	Connecticut College	6–11–1–0–1–1

Note: Semifinal and championship rounds held at the Russell Sage Rink.

Quarterfinals; February 28
1	Hamilton	5*
8	Connecticut College	4
2	Bowdoin	3
7	Amherst	1
3	Tufts	1
6	Williams	3
4	Middlebury	3**
5	Wesleyan	2

Semifinals; March 7
1	Hamilton	4
6	Williams	5*
3	Bowdoin	2
4	Middlebury	3*

Championship; March 8
6	Williams	4
4	Middlebury	2

Note: * denotes overtime period(s)

== Championships ==
School	Championships
Middlebury	8
Trinity	7
Bowdoin	4
Amherst	3
Colby	1
Hamilton	1
Wesleyan	1
Williams	1

== See also ==
- ECAC East Men's Tournament
