= 2021–22 NCAA Division II men's ice hockey season =

- Duration: October 17, 2021– March 5, 2022
- NCAA tournament: 2022

The 2021–22 NCAA Division II men's ice hockey season began on October 17, 2021 and concluded on March 5, 2022. This was the 40th season of second-tier college ice hockey.

There was no division II championship due to the small number of schools.

== Regular season ==
=== Season tournaments ===
Tournament	Dates	Teams	Champion
Terry Moran Invitational	November 26–27	4	Castleton Spartans
Stovepipe Tournament	November 27–28	4	Albertus Magnus
SUNY Canton Tournament	November 27–28	4	cancelled
Codfish Bowl	December 29–30	4	cancelled
W.B. Mason Winter Classic	January 7–8	4	cancelled

=== Standings ===
2021–22 Northeast-10 Conference ice hockey standings
	Conference									Overall					
	GP	W	L	T	OTW	OTL	PTS	GF	GA	GP	W	L	T	GF	GA
Southern New Hampshire †	18	14	4	0	3	1	40	71	58	24	16	8	0	90	75
Saint Anselm	18	10	6	2	2	1	31	63	44	27	13	12	2	85	82
Assumption *	18	10	7	1	1	0	30	61	50	30	16	12	2	102	96
Post	17	7	9	1	0	1	23	46	61	27	11	15	1	68	93
Saint Michael's	16	7	9	0	0	2	23	62	53	21	7	14	0	70	69
Franklin Pierce	16	5	9	2	0	0	17	49	61	26	8	16	2	75	93
Stonehill	17	3	12	2	0	1	12	44	69	28	7	19	2	74	96
Championship: March 5 † indicates conference regular season champion * indicates conference tournament champion Note: three separate games between Franklin Pierce, Post, Saint Michael's and Stonehill were cancelled as a result of COVID-19 protocols.

== See also ==
- 2021–22 NCAA Division I men's ice hockey season
- 2021–22 NCAA Division III men's ice hockey season
