= 2021–22 NCAA Division III men's ice hockey season =

- Duration: October 16, 2021– March 26, 2022
- NCAA tournament: 2022
- National championship: Herb Brooks Arena; Lake Placid, New York
- NCAA champion: Adrian
- Sid Watson Award: Peter Bates (St. Norbert)

The 2021–22 NCAA Division III men's ice hockey season began on October 16, 2021, and concluded on March 26, 2022. This was the 49th season of Division III college ice hockey.

== Regular season ==
Before the start of the season, Division III lost three programs. Bryn Athyn downgraded to club status due to not having a facility near enough to their campus, St. Thomas promoted its program to Division I and Becker College was forced to close as a result of financial difficulties. Stepping into the void, Arcadia and Rivier both began their varsity programs this year.

Due to COVID-19 protocols, several games were canceled, postponed, or rescheduled over the course of the season. As a result, several conferences played unbalanced schedules and relied on winning percentages to determine the final standings.

=== Standings ===
2021–22 Commonwealth Coast Conference ice hockey standings
| | Conference | | | | | | | | | | Overall | | | | | |
| | GP | W | L | T | OTW | OTL | 3/SW | PTS | GF | GA | GP | W | L | T | GF | GA |
|---|---|---|---|---|---|---|---|---|---|---|---|---|---|---|---|---|
| University of New England †* | 21 | 17 | 3 | 1 | 1 | 0 | 1 | 52 | 90 | 53 | 28 | 23 | 4 | 1 | 115 | 68 |
| Endicott | 21 | 15 | 5 | 1 | 0 | 1 | 0 | 47 | 73 | 38 | 28 | 20 | 7 | 1 | 95 | 46 |
| Salve Regina | 21 | 14 | 5 | 2 | 2 | 0 | 2 | 44 | 82 | 45 | 26 | 16 | 8 | 2 | 94 | 59 |
| Curry | 21 | 13 | 7 | 1 | 1 | 1 | 0 | 40 | 74 | 48 | 27 | 16 | 9 | 2 | 86 | 61 |
| Suffolk | 21 | 7 | 10 | 4 | 0 | 1 | 2 | 28 | 58 | 74 | 25 | 8 | 13 | 4 | 67 | 88 |
| Nichols | 21 | 6 | 15 | 0 | 0 | 1 | 0 | 19 | 49 | 77 | 25 | 8 | 16 | 1 | 62 | 90 |
| Wentworth | 21 | 4 | 15 | 2 | 1 | 2 | 1 | 16 | 44 | 78 | 26 | 5 | 18 | 3 | 55 | 98 |
| Western New England | 21 | 2 | 18 | 1 | 1 | 0 | 0 | 6 | 48 | 105 | 26 | 4 | 20 | 2 | 59 | 120 |
Championship: March 5 † indicates conference regular season champion * indicates conference tournament champions

2021–22 NCAA Division III Independent ice hockey standings
| | Overall record | | | | | |
| | GP | W | L | T | GF | GA |
|---|---|---|---|---|---|---|
| Albertus Magnus | 24 | 15 | 8 | 1 | 88 | 69 |
| Anna Maria | 19 | 8 | 10 | 1 | 57 | 56 |
| Canton State | 23 | 10 | 11 | 2 | 68 | 73 |
| Rivier | 18 | 3 | 13 | 2 | 47 | 84 |

2021–22 Massachusetts State Collegiate Athletic Conference ice hockey standings
| | Conference | | | | | | | | Overall | | | | | |
| | GP | W | L | T | OTL | PTS | GF | GA | GP | W | L | T | GF | GA |
|---|---|---|---|---|---|---|---|---|---|---|---|---|---|---|
| Plymouth State †* | 18 | 14 | 2 | 2 | 0 | 30 | 85 | 36 | 27 | 19 | 6 | 2 | 117 | 58 |
| Fitchburg State | 18 | 14 | 3 | 1 | 0 | 29 | 74 | 36 | 24 | 17 | 6 | 1 | 85 | 49 |
| Worcester State | 18 | 8 | 8 | 2 | 0 | 18 | 50 | 48 | 26 | 11 | 13 | 2 | 77 | 84 |
| Massachusetts–Dartmouth | 18 | 6 | 10 | 2 | 3 | 17 | 56 | 61 | 25 | 9 | 14 | 2 | 80 | 82 |
| Salem State | 18 | 8 | 10 | 0 | 0 | 16 | 47 | 64 | 25 | 12 | 13 | 0 | 69 | 90 |
| Westfield State | 18 | 7 | 9 | 2 | 0 | 16 | 50 | 59 | 27 | 13 | 12 | 2 | 76 | 81 |
| Framingham State | 18 | 1 | 16 | 1 | 0 | 3 | 24 | 82 | 25 | 3 | 21 | 1 | 37 | 111 |
Championship: March 5 † indicates conference regular season champion * indicates conference tournament champions

2021–22 Minnesota Intercollegiate Athletic Conference ice hockey standings
| | Conference | | | | | | | | Overall | | | | | |
| | GP | W | L | T | PTS | PT% | GF | GA | GP | W | L | T | GF | GA |
|---|---|---|---|---|---|---|---|---|---|---|---|---|---|---|
| Augsburg † | 16 | 14 | 2 | 0 | 42 | .875 | 72 | 29 | 30 | 25 | 5 | 0 | 113 | 55 |
| Concordia (MN) | 16 | 10 | 4 | 2 | 32 | .688 | 59 | 34 | 26 | 13 | 10 | 3 | 86 | 61 |
| Saint John's | 14 | 9 | 4 | 1 | 28 | .679 | 44 | 30 | 27 | 17 | 8 | 2 | 91 | 59 |
| St. Scholastica | 15 | 7 | 7 | 1 | 22 | .500 | 43 | 47 | 23 | 11 | 10 | 2 | 64 | 71 |
| Bethel | 17 | 8 | 8 | 1 | 25 | .500 | 43 | 52 | 27 | 15 | 11 | 1 | 77 | 75 |
| Saint Mary's | 12 | 5 | 7 | 0 | 15 | .417 | 34 | 39 | 23 | 8 | 14 | 1 | 57 | 80 |
| St. Olaf * | 14 | 5 | 8 | 1 | 16 | .393 | 34 | 45 | 29 | 11 | 15 | 3 | 82 | 94 |
| Hamline | 14 | 1 | 10 | 3 | 6 | .179 | 34 | 55 | 26 | 4 | 18 | 4 | 58 | 102 |
| Gustavus Adolphus | 12 | 0 | 9 | 3 | 3 | .125 | 21 | 53 | 26 | 6 | 16 | 4 | 61 | 93 |
Championship: March 5 † indicates conference regular season champion * indicates conference tournament champion

2021–22 New England Hockey Conference standings
| | Conference | | | | | | | | | | Overall | | | | | |
| | GP | W | L | T | OW | OL | PTS | PT% | GF | GA | GP | W | L | T | GF | GA |
|---|---|---|---|---|---|---|---|---|---|---|---|---|---|---|---|---|
| Hobart † | 17 | 13 | 2 | 2 | 2 | 1 | 40 | .824 | 88 | 41 | 28 | 20 | 6 | 2 | 135 | 69 |
| Elmira | 17 | 11 | 4 | 2 | 1 | 0 | 34 | .706 | 64 | 42 | 27 | 18 | 7 | 2 | 110 | 67 |
| Massachusetts–Boston | 18 | 10 | 4 | 4 | 0 | 1 | 35 | .667 | 75 | 43 | 26 | 14 | 8 | 4 | 102 | 68 |
| Babson * | 18 | 11 | 5 | 2 | 1 | 1 | 35 | .667 | 75 | 52 | 28 | 20 | 6 | 2 | 110 | 74 |
| Norwich | 18 | 9 | 5 | 4 | 2 | 1 | 30 | .611 | 64 | 41 | 23 | 12 | 6 | 5 | 82 | 49 |
| Skidmore | 18 | 9 | 7 | 2 | 1 | 1 | 29 | .556 | 62 | 43 | 28 | 16 | 10 | 2 | 92 | 63 |
| New England College | 18 | 7 | 10 | 1 | 1 | 2 | 23 | .417 | 62 | 57 | 25 | 13 | 11 | 1 | 89 | 72 |
| Southern Maine | 16 | 5 | 10 | 1 | 1 | 1 | 16 | .344 | 34 | 68 | 22 | 8 | 13 | 1 | 51 | 87 |
| Castleton | 18 | 1 | 15 | 2 | 0 | 2 | 7 | .111 | 35 | 92 | 26 | 5 | 19 | 2 | 59 | 116 |
| Johnson & Wales | 18 | 2 | 16 | 0 | 1 | 0 | 5 | .111 | 28 | 108 | 24 | 3 | 21 | 0 | 46 | 133 |
Championship: March 5 † indicates conference regular season champion * indicates conference tournament champion

2021–22 New England Small College Athletic Conference ice hockey standings
| | Conference | | | | | | | | | Overall | | | | | |
| | GP | RW | OTW | RL | OTL | T | PTS | GF | GA | GP | W | L | T | GF | GA |
|---|---|---|---|---|---|---|---|---|---|---|---|---|---|---|---|
| Colby † | 18 | 11 | 1 | 4 | 0 | 2 | 38 | 46 | 23 | 25 | 17 | 6 | 2 | 75 | 42 |
| Trinity * | 18 | 10 | 2 | 4 | 1 | 1 | 36.5 | 60 | 39 | 26 | 17 | 8 | 1 | 82 | 50 |
| Williams | 18 | 9 | 1 | 7 | 0 | 1 | 30.5 | 41 | 36 | 23 | 11 | 11 | 1 | 45 | 50 |
| Wesleyan | 18 | 7 | 1 | 5 | 2 | 3 | 29.5 | 47 | 47 | 25 | 10 | 12 | 3 | 61 | 70 |
| Hamilton | 18 | 6 | 3 | 5 | 3 | 1 | 28.5 | 41 | 40 | 22 | 11 | 10 | 1 | 47 | 56 |
| Amherst | 18 | 8 | 0 | 7 | 2 | 1 | 27.5 | 51 | 40 | 24 | 9 | 13 | 2 | 63 | 52 |
| Bowdoin | 18 | 4 | 4 | 5 | 2 | 3 | 26.5 | 51 | 52 | 22 | 8 | 10 | 4 | 61 | 67 |
| Tufts | 18 | 4 | 1 | 8 | 3 | 2 | 20 | 37 | 53 | 24 | 6 | 16 | 2 | 47 | 65 |
| Middlebury | 18 | 3 | 2 | 9 | 2 | 2 | 18 | 49 | 65 | 22 | 6 | 13 | 3 | 62 | 94 |
| Connecticut College | 18 | 3 | 1 | 11 | 1 | 2 | 15 | 34 | 62 | 24 | 6 | 15 | 3 | 45 | 77 |
Championship: March 6 † indicates conference regular season champion * indicates conference tournament champion

2021–22 Northern Collegiate Hockey Association standings
| | Conference | | | | | | | | | | Overall | | | | | |
| | GP | W | L | T | OTW | OTL | 3/SW | PTS | GF | GA | GP | W | L | T | GF | GA |
|---|---|---|---|---|---|---|---|---|---|---|---|---|---|---|---|---|
| Adrian †* | 18 | 18 | 0 | 0 | 0 | 0 | 0 | 54 | 124 | 35 | 32 | 31 | 1 | 0 | 190 | 63 |
| St. Norbert | 18 | 16 | 2 | 0 | 0 | 0 | 0 | 46 | 96 | 47 | 31 | 24 | 7 | 0 | 148 | 95 |
| Aurora | 18 | 12 | 6 | 0 | 0 | 0 | 0 | 39 | 81 | 50 | 28 | 18 | 9 | 1 | 121 | 78 |
| Trine | 18 | 11 | 7 | 0 | 0 | 0 | 0 | 34 | 77 | 60 | 28 | 19 | 9 | 0 | 114 | 80 |
| Lawrence | 18 | 8 | 8 | 2 | 0 | 0 | 1 | 26 | 52 | 67 | 27 | 10 | 13 | 4 | 76 | 101 |
| MSOE | 18 | 8 | 9 | 1 | 0 | 0 | 1 | 25 | 59 | 66 | 27 | 11 | 14 | 2 | 93 | 98 |
| Marian | 18 | 5 | 11 | 2 | 0 | 0 | 2 | 20 | 56 | 68 | 27 | 10 | 14 | 3 | 85 | 100 |
| Lake Forest | 18 | 5 | 11 | 2 | 0 | 0 | 0 | 18 | 58 | 77 | 27 | 7 | 18 | 2 | 78 | 104 |
| Concordia (WI) | 18 | 2 | 15 | 1 | 0 | 0 | 0 | 9 | 38 | 102 | 25 | 3 | 20 | 2 | 55 | 136 |
| Finlandia | 18 | 1 | 17 | 0 | 0 | 0 | 0 | 2 | 29 | 98 | 25 | 2 | 23 | 0 | 39 | 122 |
Championship: March 5 † indicates conference regular season champion * indicates conference tournament champion

2021–22 State University of New York Athletic Conference ice hockey standings
| | Conference | | | | | | | | | | Overall | | | | | |
| | GP | W | L | T | OTW | OTL | PTS | PT% | GF | GA | GP | W | L | T | GF | GA |
|---|---|---|---|---|---|---|---|---|---|---|---|---|---|---|---|---|
| Geneseo State †* | 15 | 12 | 2 | 1 | 0 | 0 | 37 | .833 | 73 | 26 | 28 | 23 | 4 | 1 | 131 | 50 |
| Oswego State | 16 | 12 | 3 | 1 | 0 | 0 | 37 | .781 | 55 | 31 | 25 | 18 | 6 | 1 | 88 | 51 |
| Plattsburgh State | 16 | 11 | 4 | 1 | 2 | 0 | 32 | .719 | 68 | 47 | 26 | 15 | 8 | 3 | 112 | 83 |
| Cortland State | 16 | 9 | 5 | 2 | 1 | 1 | 29 | .625 | 46 | 35 | 27 | 15 | 10 | 2 | 85 | 62 |
| Fredonia State | 16 | 8 | 8 | 0 | 0 | 0 | 24 | .500 | 48 | 57 | 22 | 10 | 11 | 1 | 63 | 74 |
| Brockport State | 16 | 6 | 8 | 2 | 0 | 1 | 21 | .438 | 50 | 48 | 27 | 14 | 11 | 2 | 97 | 72 |
| Potsdam State | 16 | 4 | 11 | 1 | 0 | 0 | 13 | .281 | 31 | 66 | 22 | 5 | 16 | 1 | 41 | 90 |
| Buffalo State | 15 | 3 | 12 | 0 | 1 | 1 | 9 | .200 | 25 | 50 | 23 | 5 | 18 | 0 | 46 | 88 |
| Morrisville State | 16 | 2 | 14 | 0 | 1 | 2 | 0 | .125 | 31 | 67 | 25 | 7 | 16 | 2 | 53 | 85 |
Championship: March 5 † indicates conference regular season champion * indicates conference tournament champions

2021–22 United Collegiate Hockey Conference standings
| | Conference record | | | | | | | | | | Overall record | | | | | |
| | GP | W | L | T | OW | OL | SW | PTS | GF | GA | GP | W | L | T | GF | GA |
|---|---|---|---|---|---|---|---|---|---|---|---|---|---|---|---|---|
| Utica †* | 18 | 17 | 0 | 1 | 0 | 0 | 1 | 53 | 49 | 16 | 29 | 25 | 3 | 1 | 164 | 40 |
| Wilkes | 18 | 15 | 2 | 1 | 1 | 1 | 0 | 46 | 38 | 31 | 26 | 20 | 5 | 1 | 129 | 65 |
| Stevenson | 18 | 14 | 4 | 0 | 5 | 0 | 0 | 37 | 42 | 21 | 26 | 18 | 7 | 1 | 87 | 66 |
| Chatham | 18 | 8 | 8 | 2 | 1 | 2 | 0 | 27 | 27 | 30 | 25 | 10 | 13 | 2 | 74 | 92 |
| Nazareth | 18 | 8 | 9 | 1 | 0 | 1 | 0 | 26 | 17 | 58 | 26 | 9 | 15 | 2 | 82 | 97 |
| Manhattanville | 18 | 6 | 9 | 3 | 2 | 0 | 3 | 22 | 7 | 13 | 26 | 10 | 13 | 3 | 81 | 99 |
| Neumann | 18 | 5 | 12 | 1 | 1 | 3 | 1 | 19 | 14 | 28 | 25 | 8 | 16 | 1 | 89 | 119 |
| Lebanon Valley | 18 | 5 | 12 | 1 | 1 | 3 | 0 | 18 | 14 | 21 | 24 | 6 | 17 | 1 | 56 | 115 |
| King's | 18 | 4 | 14 | 0 | 0 | 2 | 0 | 14 | 0 | 0 | 24 | 5 | 19 | 0 | 62 | 111 |
| Arcadia | 18 | 3 | 15 | 0 | 1 | 0 | 0 | 8 | 0 | 0 | 25 | 5 | 20 | 0 | 52 | 132 |
Championship: March 5 † indicates conference regular season champion * indicates conference tournament champions

2021–22 Wisconsin Intercollegiate Athletic Conference ice hockey standings
| | Conference | | | | | | | | | | Overall | | | | | |
| | GP | W | L | T | OTW | OTL | PTS | PT% | GF | GA | GP | W | L | T | GF | GA |
|---|---|---|---|---|---|---|---|---|---|---|---|---|---|---|---|---|
| Wisconsin–Stevens Point † | 13 | 11 | 2 | 0 | 1 | 0 | 32 | .821 | 57 | 22 | 28 | 21 | 6 | 1 | 111 | 59 |
| Wisconsin–River Falls | 15 | 9 | 6 | 0 | 1 | 1 | 27 | .600 | 41 | 37 | 27 | 13 | 13 | 1 | 65 | 67 |
| Wisconsin–Eau Claire * | 15 | 9 | 6 | 0 | 2 | 1 | 26 | .578 | 36 | 30 | 30 | 18 | 11 | 1 | 79 | 58 |
| Wisconsin–Stout | 15 | 6 | 9 | 0 | 0 | 2 | 20 | .444 | 44 | 58 | 27 | 8 | 19 | 0 | 71 | 99 |
| Wisconsin–Superior | 13 | 6 | 6 | 1 | 0 | 0 | 19 | .487 | 40 | 34 | 29 | 15 | 12 | 2 | 96 | 77 |
| Northland | 15 | 1 | 13 | 1 | 1 | 0 | 5 | .111 | 20 | 57 | 27 | 4 | 20 | 3 | 37 | 93 |
Championship: March 5 † indicates conference regular season champion * indicates conference tournament champion

Note: Mini-game are not included in final standings

== Player stats ==
=== Scoring leaders ===
GP = Games played; G = Goals; A = Assists; Pts = Points; PIM = Penalty minutes

| Player | Class | Team | GP | G | A | Pts | PIM |
|---|---|---|---|---|---|---|---|
| Peter Bates | Senior | St. Norbert | 31 | 28 | 30 | 58 | 4 |
| Alessio Luciani | Junior | Adrian | 30 | 17 | 31 | 48 | 14 |
| Liam Fraser | Freshman | St. Norbert | 30 | 24 | 23 | 47 | 8 |
| Sam Ruffin | Junior | Adrian | 30 | 19 | 28 | 47 | 10 |
| Regen Cavanagh | Senior | Utica | 29 | 20 | 26 | 46 | 8 |
| Buster Larsson | Junior | Utica | 29 | 16 | 30 | 46 | 16 |
| Ty Enns | Junior | Adrian | 31 | 20 | 25 | 45 | 18 |
| Peyton Frantti | Senior | St. Norbert | 25 | 16 | 28 | 44 | 6 |
| Peter Morgan | Freshman | Geneseo State | 28 | 18 | 25 | 43 | 6 |
| Dante Zapata | Junior | Utica | 29 | 16 | 27 | 43 | 10 |

=== Leading goaltenders ===
GP = Games played; Min = Minutes played; W = Wins; L = Losses; T = Ties; GA = Goals against; SO = Shutouts; SV% = Save percentage; GAA = Goals against average

| Player | Class | Team | GP | Min | W | L | T | GA | SO | SV% | GAA |
|---|---|---|---|---|---|---|---|---|---|---|---|
| Sean Dickson | Senior | Utica | 18 | 989 | 16 | 2 | 0 | 36 | 4 | .929 | 1.33 |
| Conor O'Brien | Senior | Endicott | 26 | 1554 | 19 | 6 | 1 | 36 | 4 | .949 | 1.41 |
| J.P. Mella | Sophomore | Trinity | 12 | 707 | 8 | 2 | 1 | 18 | 2 | .941 | 1.53 |
| Samuel Vyletelka | Freshman | Augsburg | 14 | 840 | 11 | 3 | 0 | 21 | 4 | .939 | 1.50 |
| Andrew Beran | Sophomore | Colby | 24 | 1442 | 15 | 6 | 2 | 39 | 4 | .937 | 1.62 |
| Ryan Ouellette | Freshman | Wisconsin–Eau Claire | 24 | 1406 | 17 | 6 | 1 | 39 | 6 | .923 | 1.66 |
| Elias Sandholm | Sophomore | Trine | 11 | 567 | 8 | 0 | 0 | 16 | 2 | .913 | 1.69 |
| Nico Pidro | Senior | Wilkes | 13 | 598 | 9 | 1 | 1 | 17 | 0 | .935 | 1.71 |
| Adam Harris | Freshman | Geneseo State | 6 | 346 | 5 | 0 | 1 | 10 | 1 | .925 | 1.73 |
| Matt Petizian | Senior | Geneseo State | 24 | 1371 | 19 | 4 | 0 | 40 | 3 | .927 | 1.77 |
| Drennen Atherton | Junior | Norwich | 16 | 942 | 7 | 3 | 5 | 28 | 1 | .935 | 1.77 |

== 2022 NCAA Tournament ==
First Round; March 12
E4 | Hobart | 4
E6 | Elmira | 2
W3 | St. Norbert | 4*
W4 | St. Olaf | 3
E3 | Babson | 3
E8 | Trinity | 0
E5 | University of New England | 3**
E7 | Plymouth State | 2

Quarterfinals; March 19
W1 | Adrian (1) | 7
E4 | Hobart | 2
W2 | Augsburg (4) | 4
W3 | St. Norbert | 1
E2 | Geneseo State (3) | 3
E3 | Babson | 2
E1 | Utica (2) | 0
E5 | University of New England | 2

Semifinals; March 25
W1 | Adrian (1) | 5
W2 | Augsburg (4) | 1
E2 | Geneseo State (3) | 8
E5 | University of New England | 3

National Championship; March 26
W1 | Adrian (1) | 5
E2 | Geneseo State (3) | 2

Note: * denotes overtime period(s)

== See also ==
- 2021–22 NCAA Division I men's ice hockey season
- 2021–22 NCAA Division II men's ice hockey season
