= 2000–01 NCAA Division III men's ice hockey season =

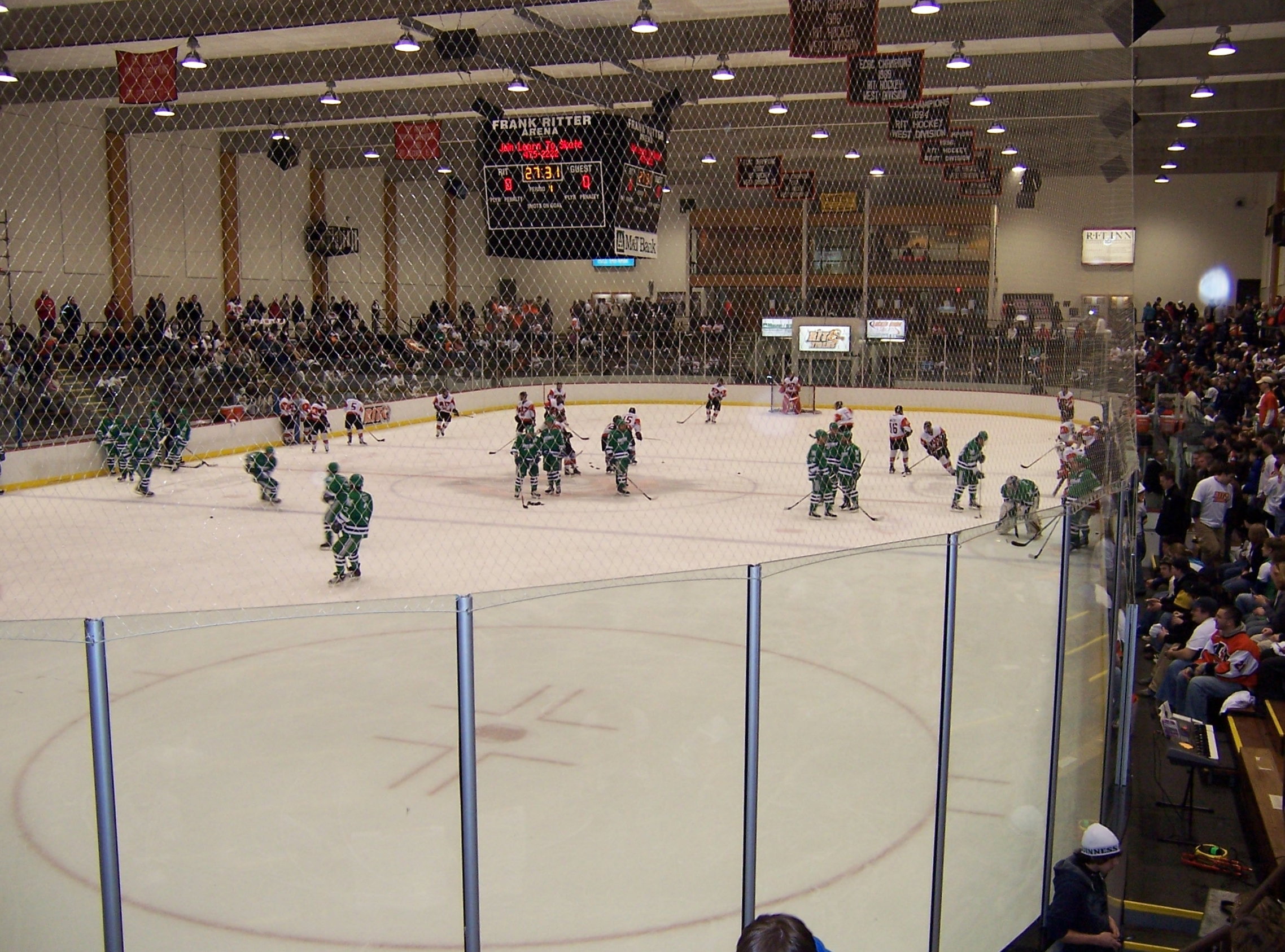
- Frank Ritter Memorial Ice Arena was the host of the 2001 Frozen Four
- Duration: October 20, 2000– March 17, 2001
- NCAA tournament: 2001
- National championship: Frank Ritter Memorial Ice Arena; Rochester, New York
- NCAA champion: Plattsburgh State
- Sid Watson Award: Keith Aucoin (Norwich)

The 2000–01 NCAA Division III men's ice hockey season began on October 20, 2000 and concluded on March 17, 2001. This was the 28th season of Division III college ice hockey.

== Regular season ==
=== Standings ===
2000–01 ECAC East standings
| | Conference | | | | | | | Overall | | | | | |
| | GP | W | L | T | PTS | GF | GA | GP | W | L | T | GF | GA |
|---|---|---|---|---|---|---|---|---|---|---|---|---|---|
| Norwich † | 17 | 13 | 3 | 1 | 27 | 104 | 40 | 28 | 18 | 9 | 1 | 141 | 73 |
| Salem State | 17 | 10 | 5 | 2 | 22 | 73 | 39 | 26 | 16 | 6 | 4 | 117 | 59 |
| New England College * | 17 | 10 | 7 | 0 | 20 | 72 | 66 | 30 | 20 | 10 | 0 | 129 | 108 |
| Babson | 17 | 8 | 6 | 3 | 19 | 63 | 55 | 27 | 15 | 8 | 4 | 102 | 85 |
| Skidmore | 17 | 5 | 10 | 2 | 12 | 41 | 79 | 24 | 8 | 14 | 2 | 62 | 106 |
| Saint Anselm ~ | 17 | 4 | 12 | 1 | 9 | 41 | 79 | 26 | 10 | 14 | 2 | 92 | 117 |
| Massachusetts–Boston | 17 | 2 | 13 | 2 | 6 | 41 | 96 | 24 | 4 | 17 | 3 | 62 | 122 |
| Southern Maine | 17 | 2 | 14 | 1 | 5 | 33 | 86 | 26 | 5 | 19 | 2 | 62 | 122 |
| MCLA | 17 | 1 | 16 | 0 | 2 | 34 | 94 | 26 | 4 | 22 | 0 | 62 | 123 |
Championship: March 4, 2001 † indicates conference regular season champion * indicates conference tournament champion ~ indicates Division II Tournament champion

2000–01 ECAC Northeast standings
| | Conference | | | | | | | Overall | | | | | |
| | GP | W | L | T | PTS | GF | GA | GP | W | L | T | GF | GA |
Division III
| Tufts † | 17 | 15 | 1 | 1 | 31 | 98 | 46 | 24 | 17 | 6 | 1 | 131 | 81 |
| Wentworth | 17 | 14 | 2 | 1 | 29 | 94 | 27 | 28 | 18 | 8 | 2 | 133 | 65 |
| Johnson & Wales | 17 | 14 | 2 | 1 | 29 | 100 | 35 | 27 | 18 | 7 | 2 | 144 | 76 |
| Lebanon Valley * | 17 | 12 | 4 | 1 | 25 | 72 | 39 | 29 | 18 | 9 | 2 | 116 | 91 |
| Massachusetts–Dartmouth | 17 | 10 | 5 | 2 | 22 | 68 | 58 | 26 | 15 | 9 | 2 | 105 | 90 |
| Worcester State | 17 | 9 | 7 | 1 | 19 | 64 | 61 | 25 | 12 | 12 | 1 | 93 | 94 |
| Fitchburg State | 17 | 9 | 7 | 1 | 19 | 67 | 57 | 26 | 11 | 13 | 2 | 92 | 98 |
| Salve Regina | 17 | 7 | 10 | 0 | 14 | 57 | 72 | 26 | 11 | 15 | 0 | 85 | 115 |
| Suffolk | 17 | 6 | 11 | 0 | 12 | 55 | 90 | 22 | 9 | 12 | 1 | 78 | 109 |
| Western New England | 17 | 4 | 12 | 1 | 9 | 60 | 82 | 23 | 7 | 14 | 2 | 76 | 111 |
| Framingham State | 17 | 4 | 13 | 0 | 8 | 58 | 84 | 24 | 6 | 18 | 0 | 78 | 117 |
| Plymouth State | 17 | 4 | 13 | 0 | 8 | 40 | 78 | 25 | 4 | 20 | 1 | 54 | 126 |
| Curry | 17 | 3 | 13 | 1 | 7 | 44 | 90 | 22 | 4 | 17 | 1 | 55 | 115 |
| Nichols | 17 | 2 | 15 | 0 | 4 | 50 | 99 | 23 | 4 | 19 | 0 | 72 | 120 |
Division II
| New Hampshire College | 17 | 13 | 4 | 0 | 26 | 82 | 56 | 26 | 17 | 8 | 1 | 114 | 92 |
| Stonehill | 17 | 9 | 8 | 0 | 18 | 83 | 82 | 22 | 10 | 11 | 1 | 102 | 107 |
| Saint Michael's | 17 | 8 | 8 | 1 | 17 | 69 | 78 | 27 | 10 | 15 | 2 | 105 | 128 |
| Assumption | 17 | 4 | 12 | 1 | 9 | 61 | 88 | 24 | 4 | 19 | 1 | 69 | 130 |
Division III Championship: March 3, 2001; Division II Championship: March 3, 2001 † indicates conference regular season champion * indicates conference tournament champions ~ indicates Division II Tournament champion

2000–01 ECAC West standings
| | Conference | | | | | | | Overall | | | | | |
| | GP | W | L | T | PTS | GF | GA | GP | W | L | T | GF | GA |
|---|---|---|---|---|---|---|---|---|---|---|---|---|---|
| RIT †* | 6 | 6 | 0 | 0 | 12 | 37 | 11 | 29 | 27 | 1 | 1 | 210 | 66 |
| Elmira | 6 | 3 | 3 | 0 | 6 | 27 | 25 | 26 | 16 | 10 | 0 | 138 | 99 |
| Manhattanville | 6 | 2 | 3 | 1 | 5 | 20 | 21 | 27 | 14 | 11 | 2 | 114 | 81 |
| Hobart | 6 | 0 | 5 | 1 | 1 | 11 | 38 | 25 | 6 | 15 | 4 | 79 | 111 |
Championship: March 3, 2001 † indicates conference regular season champion * indicates conference tournament champions

2000–01 NCAA Division III Independent ice hockey standings
| | Overall record | | | | | |
| | GP | W | L | T | GF | GA |
|---|---|---|---|---|---|---|
| Neumann | 22 | 2 | 20 | 0 | 44 | 148 |
| Scranton | 1 | 0 | 1 | 0 | 2 | 3 |

2000–01 Midwest Collegiate Hockey Association standings
| | Conference | | | | | | | Overall | | | | | |
| | GP | W | L | T | Pct. | GF | GA | GP | W | L | T | GF | GA |
|---|---|---|---|---|---|---|---|---|---|---|---|---|---|
| Minnesota–Crookston † | 12 | 11 | 0 | 1 | .958 | 78 | 24 | 25 | 17 | 7 | 1 | 130 | 84 |
| Marian * | 14 | 11 | 2 | 1 | .821 | 73 | 31 | 27 | 16 | 8 | 3 | 111 | 83 |
| Northland | 16 | 6 | 10 | 0 | .375 | 49 | 76 | 25 | 6 | 19 | 0 | 78 | 141 |
| Lawrence | 14 | 3 | 10 | 1 | .250 | 36 | 69 | 24 | 4 | 18 | 2 | 54 | 134 |
| MSOE | 16 | 3 | 12 | 1 | .219 | 42 | 78 | 25 | 3 | 21 | 1 | 59 | 136 |
Championship: February 24, 2001 † indicates conference regular season champion * indicates conference tournament champions

2000–01 Minnesota Intercollegiate Athletic Conference ice hockey standings
| | Conference | | | | | | | Overall | | | | | |
| | GP | W | L | T | Pts | GF | GA | GP | W | L | T | GF | GA |
|---|---|---|---|---|---|---|---|---|---|---|---|---|---|
| St. Thomas † | 16 | 11 | 3 | 2 | 24 | 80 | 46 | 27 | 15 | 9 | 3 | 122 | 87 |
| Concordia (MN) | 16 | 11 | 4 | 1 | 23 | 62 | 39 | 27 | 14 | 11 | 2 | 98 | 79 |
| Saint John's * | 16 | 10 | 4 | 2 | 22 | 58 | 45 | 31 | 15 | 12 | 4 | 102 | 101 |
| Bethel | 16 | 9 | 6 | 1 | 19 | 74 | 56 | 29 | 13 | 13 | 3 | 125 | 124 |
| Augsburg | 16 | 9 | 6 | 1 | 19 | 70 | 52 | 25 | 12 | 11 | 2 | 97 | 88 |
| Saint Mary's | 16 | 4 | 8 | 4 | 12 | 52 | 64 | 25 | 9 | 12 | 4 | 95 | 102 |
| St. Olaf | 16 | 4 | 11 | 1 | 9 | 46 | 81 | 25 | 8 | 16 | 1 | 85 | 116 |
| Hamline | 16 | 4 | 12 | 0 | 8 | 43 | 82 | 25 | 11 | 14 | 0 | 96 | 113 |
| Gustavus Adolphus | 16 | 3 | 11 | 2 | 8 | 39 | 60 | 25 | 6 | 16 | 3 | 56 | 89 |
Championship: March 4, 2001 † indicates conference regular season champion * indicates conference tournament champion

2000–01 New England Small College Athletic Conference ice hockey standings
| | Conference | | | | | | | Overall | | | | | |
| | GP | W | L | T | PTS | GF | GA | GP | W | L | T | GF | GA |
|---|---|---|---|---|---|---|---|---|---|---|---|---|---|
| Middlebury †* | 17 | 16 | 1 | 0 | 32 | 85 | 20 | 28 | 23 | 4 | 1 | 120 | 44 |
| Amherst | 17 | 12 | 2 | 3 | 27 | 78 | 33 | 26 | 18 | 5 | 3 | 118 | 55 |
| Colby | 17 | 12 | 4 | 1 | 25 | 69 | 46 | 25 | 15 | 9 | 1 | 94 | 81 |
| Trinity | 17 | 12 | 4 | 1 | 25 | 65 | 44 | 24 | 15 | 7 | 2 | 93 | 69 |
| Bowdoin | 17 | 11 | 6 | 0 | 22 | 85 | 53 | 25 | 14 | 10 | 1 | 107 | 83 |
| Hamilton | 17 | 10 | 7 | 0 | 20 | 67 | 60 | 25 | 11 | 13 | 1 | 96 | 101 |
| Williams | 17 | 7 | 9 | 1 | 15 | 61 | 58 | 25 | 9 | 15 | 1 | 81 | 90 |
| Connecticut College | 17 | 4 | 12 | 1 | 9 | 40 | 82 | 21 | 7 | 13 | 1 | 66 | 108 |
| Wesleyan | 17 | 4 | 12 | 1 | 9 | 66 | 88 | 24 | 8 | 14 | 2 | 96 | 114 |
Championship: March 3, 2001 † indicates conference regular season champion * indicates conference tournament champion

2000–01 Northern Collegiate Hockey Association standings
| | Conference | | | | | | | Overall | | | | | |
| | GP | W | L | T | Pts | GF | GA | GP | W | L | T | GF | GA |
|---|---|---|---|---|---|---|---|---|---|---|---|---|---|
| Wisconsin–Superior †* | 14 | 11 | 3 | 0 | 22 | 63 | 32 | 35 | 30 | 4 | 1 | 163 | 77 |
| Wisconsin–River Falls | 14 | 10 | 4 | 0 | 20 | 71 | 38 | 35 | 23 | 10 | 2 | 146 | 86 |
| St. Norbert | 14 | 9 | 4 | 1 | 19 | 64 | 39 | 29 | 18 | 8 | 3 | 129 | 72 |
| Wisconsin–Stout | 14 | 9 | 5 | 0 | 18 | 52 | 57 | 27 | 15 | 11 | 1 | 98 | 102 |
| Wisconsin–Stevens Point | 14 | 7 | 7 | 0 | 14 | 49 | 48 | 29 | 17 | 12 | 0 | 110 | 94 |
| St. Scholastica | 14 | 3 | 10 | 1 | 7 | 39 | 75 | 27 | 9 | 17 | 1 | 86 | 122 |
| Lake Forest | 14 | 3 | 11 | 0 | 6 | 42 | 62 | 25 | 9 | 14 | 2 | 86 | 96 |
| Wisconsin–Eau Claire | 14 | 3 | 11 | 0 | 6 | 34 | 63 | 27 | 9 | 18 | 0 | 88 | 120 |
Championship: March 3, 2001 † indicates conference regular season champion * indicates conference tournament champion

2000–01 State University of New York Athletic Conference ice hockey standings
| | Conference | | | | | | | Overall | | | | | |
| | GP | W | L | T | PTS | GF | GA | GP | W | L | T | GF | GA |
|---|---|---|---|---|---|---|---|---|---|---|---|---|---|
| Plattsburgh State †* | 14 | 13 | 1 | 0 | 26 | 89 | 32 | 34 | 29 | 5 | 0 | 173 | 79 |
| Oswego State | 14 | 10 | 4 | 0 | 20 | 67 | 34 | 27 | 17 | 9 | 1 | 137 | 81 |
| Potsdam State | 14 | 8 | 3 | 3 | 19 | 48 | 43 | 31 | 20 | 8 | 3 | 120 | 90 |
| Fredonia State | 14 | 7 | 5 | 2 | 16 | 44 | 32 | 26 | 12 | 11 | 3 | 74 | 72 |
| Geneseo State | 14 | 5 | 7 | 2 | 12 | 55 | 57 | 29 | 14 | 13 | 2 | 124 | 127 |
| Cortland State | 14 | 4 | 8 | 2 | 10 | 39 | 57 | 27 | 9 | 16 | 2 | 84 | 108 |
| Buffalo State | 14 | 4 | 10 | 0 | 8 | 49 | 73 | 25 | 12 | 12 | 1 | 108 | 110 |
| Brockport State | 14 | 0 | 13 | 1 | 1 | 28 | 91 | 25 | 2 | 21 | 2 | 58 | 167 |
Championship: March 4, 2001 † indicates conference regular season champion * indicates conference tournament champions

Note: Mini-game are not included in final standings

== 2001 NCAA tournament ==
Quarterfinals; March 9–10
RIT | 8 | 10 | -
Lebanon Valley | 1 | 2 | -
Wisconsin–River Falls | 8 | 2 | -
New England College | 1 | 1 | -
Wisconsin–Superior | 5 | 4 | -
Saint John's | 4 | 0 | -
Plattsburgh State | 3 | 5 | -
Middlebury | 1 | 2 | -

Semifinals; March 16
RIT | 5
Wisconsin–River Falls | 2
Wisconsin–Superior | 3
Plattsburgh State | 5

National championship March 17
RIT | 2
Plattsburgh State | 6
Third-place game
Wisconsin–River Falls | 1
Wisconsin–Superior | 3

Note: * denotes overtime period(s)

== See also ==
- 2000–01 NCAA Division I men's ice hockey season
