= 2006–07 NCAA Division III men's ice hockey season =

- Duration: October 15, 2006– March 19, 2007
- NCAA tournament: 2007
- National championship: Wessman Arena; Superior, Wisconsin
- NCAA champion: Oswego State
- Sid Watson Award: Andrew Gallant (Manhattanville)

The 2006–07 NCAA Division III men's ice hockey season began on October 15, 2006 and concluded on March 18, 2007. This was the 34th season of Division III college ice hockey.

== Regular season ==
=== Standings ===
2006–07 ECAC East standings
	Conference							Overall					
	GP	W	L	T	PTS	GF	GA	GP	W	L	T	GF	GA
Division III
Norwich †	19	14	5	0	28	75	40	28	20	8	0	116	62
New England College	19	13	5	1	27	79	48	28	17	10	1	108	82
Skidmore	19	12	5	2	26	56	49	26	16	8	2	89	72
Southern Maine	19	12	5	2	26	72	47	26	15	9	2	102	69
Castleton State	19	11	4	4	26	68	47	27	17	6	4	114	67
Babson *	19	11	7	1	23	71	51	29	18	10	1	112	81
Salem State	19	5	14	0	10	41	68	26	9	17	0	67	84
Massachusetts–Boston	19	3	16	0	6	39	100	26	5	20	1	48	115
Division II
Saint Anselm	19	8	8	3	19	55	55	28	13	12	3	99	81
Saint Michael's	19	2	17	0	4	39	100	26	6	20	2	72	122
ECAC East Championship: March 4, 2007; Northeast-10 Championship: March 4, 2007 † indicates conference regular season champion * indicates conference tournament champion ~ indicates Northeast-10 Tournament champion

2006–07 ECAC Northeast standings
	Conference							Overall					
	GP	W	L	T	PTS	GF	GA	GP	W	L	T	GF	GA
Division III
Massachusetts–Dartmouth †*	15	14	1	0	28	73	29	29	25	3	1	148	58
Curry	15	13	1	1	27	102	29	27	16	9	2	141	83
Wentworth	15	11	2	2	24	71	35	28	16	9	3	116	94
Plymouth State	15	10	4	1	21	62	44	26	11	13	2	86	100
Fitchburg State	15	9	4	2	20	62	48	27	14	10	3	99	93
Johnson & Wales	15	9	6	0	18	56	57	25	12	12	1	86	117
Nichols	15	8	6	1	17	69	54	26	13	11	2	104	103
Salve Regina	15	8	7	0	16	44	46	25	10	14	1	68	94
Suffolk	15	6	8	1	13	62	66	24	7	15	2	88	104
Worcester State	15	4	11	0	8	44	76	23	6	16	1	69	110
Western New England	15	2	13	0	4	36	78	23	8	15	0	64	98
Framingham State	15	0	14	1	1	46	83	23	2	20	1	68	122
Division II
Southern New Hampshire	15	9	6	0	18	59	59	27	12	14	1	99	121
Stonehill ~	15	6	8	1	13	57	64	27	14	12	1	114	104
Assumption	15	3	10	2	8	42	67	27	7	18	2	77	134
Franklin Pierce	15	1	12	2	4	31	81	24	5	17	2	66	130
ECAC Northeast Championship: March 3, 2007; Northeast-10 Championship: March 4, 2007 † indicates conference regular season champion * indicates conference tournament champions ~ indicates Northeast-10 Tournament champion

2006–07 ECAC West standings
	Conference							Overall					
	GP	W	L	T	PTS	GF	GA	GP	W	L	T	GF	GA
Manhattanville †*	15	9	1	5	23	71	29	28	21	2	5	151	54
Neumann	15	8	3	4	20	80	41	27	17	5	5	137	74
Utica	15	7	5	3	17	52	39	25	13	9	3	87	61
Elmira	15	7	6	2	16	55	50	27	13	10	4	96	86
Hobart	15	5	7	3	13	50	51	26	13	8	5	106	79
Lebanon Valley	15	0	14	1	1	26	124	25	2	22	1	58	174
Championship: March 3, 2007 † indicates conference regular season champion * indicates conference tournament champions

2006–07 NCAA Division III Independent ice hockey standings
	Overall record					
	GP	W	L	T	GF	GA
Becker	22	2	18	2	55	111
Morrisville State	17	7	10	0	50	72

2006–07 Midwest Collegiate Hockey Association standings
	Conference							Overall					
	GP	W	L	T	PTS	GF	GA	GP	W	L	T	GF	GA
MSOE †	20	16	2	2	34	89	43	27	19	6	2	119	71
Finlandia *	20	15	5	0	30	106	47	27	19	8	0	134	76
Marian	20	12	6	2	26	83	51	29	14	12	3	114	88
Lawrence	20	8	11	1	17	60	66	26	13	14	2	87	95
Minnesota–Crookston	20	5	13	2	12	54	93	26	7	16	3	72	123
Northland	20	0	19	1	1	29	121	27	0	26	1	35	159
Championship: March 4, 2007 † indicates conference regular season champion * indicates conference tournament champions

2006–07 Minnesota Intercollegiate Athletic Conference ice hockey standings
	Conference							Overall					
	GP	W	L	T	Pts	GF	GA	GP	W	L	T	GF	GA
Bethel †*	16	12	3	1	25	69	35	27	18	10	1	112	82
St. Thomas	16	12	4	0	24	76	46	27	17	10	0	107	82
Augsburg	16	9	3	4	22	59	42	26	12	10	4	85	75
St. Olaf	16	9	5	2	20	50	45	27	11	14	2	70	80
Gustavus Adolphus	16	9	6	1	19	51	49	26	11	13	2	85	92
Saint John's	16	6	9	1	13	45	49	25	9	14	2	67	77
Saint Mary's	16	4	11	1	9	46	54	25	7	17	1	74	96
Concordia (MN)	16	3	13	0	6	40	76	25	7	18	0	70	117
Hamline	16	3	13	0	6	39	79	25	7	18	0	71	123
Championship: March 3, 2007 † indicates conference regular season champion * indicates conference tournament champion

2006–07 New England Small College Athletic Conference ice hockey standings
	Conference							Overall					
	GP	W	L	T	PTS	GF	GA	GP	W	L	T	GF	GA
Bowdoin †	19	11	6	2	24	73	53	26	16	7	3	111	68
Middlebury †*	19	11	6	2	24	64	46	31	20	8	3	112	71
Colby	19	11	7	1	23	76	56	25	14	9	2	106	70
Wesleyan	19	9	6	4	22	56	48	24	11	8	5	72	64
Amherst	19	10	8	1	21	71	71	25	14	10	1	93	86
Connecticut College	19	9	9	1	19	59	56	24	10	13	1	69	81
Williams	19	8	9	2	18	53	58	24	8	14	2	61	85
Trinity	19	6	10	3	15	67	61	25	8	13	4	86	83
Hamilton	19	6	12	1	13	57	76	24	7	16	1	68	99
Tufts	19	3	16	0	6	53	99	24	6	18	0	71	119
Championship: March 3, 2007 † indicates conference regular season champion * indicates conference tournament champion

2006–07 Northern Collegiate Hockey Association standings
	Conference							Overall					
	GP	W	L	T	Pts	GF	GA	GP	W	L	T	GF	GA
Wisconsin–River Falls †	14	10	3	1	21	45	31	29	21	6	2	110	65
St. Norbert †*	14	10	3	1	21	55	32	31	25	4	2	136	56
Wisconsin–Stout †	14	10	3	1	21	49	34	28	21	5	2	106	65
Wisconsin–Superior	14	9	4	1	19	48	35	27	20	6	1	109	63
St. Scholastica	14	6	7	1	13	45	45	29	15	12	2	88	80
Wisconsin–Stevens Point	14	3	10	1	7	41	61	27	7	18	2	83	118
Wisconsin–Eau Claire	14	2	9	3	7	30	46	27	9	14	4	74	81
Lake Forest	14	0	11	3	3	36	55	27	3	21	3	62	118
Championship: March 3, 2007 † indicates conference regular season champion * indicates conference tournament champion

2006–07 State University of New York Athletic Conference ice hockey standings
	Conference							Overall					
	GP	W	L	T	PTS	GF	GA	GP	W	L	T	GF	GA
Oswego State †	14	11	1	2	24	64	28	29	23	3	3	139	56
Geneseo State	14	10	4	0	20	52	30	26	16	10	0	99	86
Plattsburgh State	14	6	4	4	16	61	40	28	14	8	6	129	76
Buffalo State	14	6	7	1	13	45	46	26	12	12	2	90	86
Fredonia State *	14	5	7	2	12	39	48	29	15	10	4	106	93
Brockport State	14	3	6	5	11	39	54	26	7	12	7	67	100
Cortland State	14	3	8	3	9	41	62	25	8	14	3	71	102
Potsdam State	14	3	10	1	7	42	75	25	5	19	1	68	130
Championship: March 3, 2007 † indicates conference regular season champion * indicates conference tournament champions

Note: Mini-game are not included in final standings

== 2007 NCAA Tournament ==
First Round; March 7
W2	Wisconsin–River Falls	1
W3	Bethel	2
E6	Middlebury	9
E7	Fredonia State	0

Quarterfinals; March 10
W1	St. Norbert	4
W3	Bethel	1
E3	Oswego State	3
E4	Norwich	0
E2	Manhattanville	5
E5	Babson	3
E1	Massachusetts–Dartmouth	2
E6	Middlebury	3

Semifinals; March 17
W1	St. Norbert	3
E3	Oswego State	4*
E2	Manhattanville	2
E6	Middlebury	3

National Championship; March 18
E3	Oswego State	4*
E6	Middlebury	3

Note: * denotes overtime period(s)

== See also ==
- 2006–07 NCAA Division I men's ice hockey season
