= NEHC Men's Tournament =

New England Hockey Conference men's tournament
- Conference hockey championship
- Sport: Ice hockey
- Conference: New England Hockey Conference
- Format: Single-elimination
- Played: 1985–2025
- Most championships: Norwich (14)

== History ==
The New England Hockey Conference men's tournament began as the 'ECAC East Tournament' in 1985, a year after ECAC 2 downgraded to Division III and during the season where the conference formally split into two separate entities. For most of its existence the tournament was an 8-team format but on occasion the top seed would receive a bye into the semifinal round. For a few years during the late 1990s the tournament was expanded to include 10 teams but this was abandoned when nine teams left to form the ice hockey division of the NESCAC. Beginning with the 2004 tournament, the top seeded team to reach the semifinal round served as host for all semifinal and championship games regardless of their participation. This arrangement was abandoned after the 2013 tournament and the final two rounds were placed on different weekends. The 2021 tournament was cancelled due to the COVID-19 pandemic.

== 1985 ==
Seed	School	Conference record	Seed	School	Conference record
1	Salem State	18–6–0	5	Holy Cross	13–9–0
2	Babson	16–6–0	6	Bowdoin	9–8–1
3	Merrimack	12–6–3	7	Saint Anselm	10–10–0
4	Norwich	13–9–0	8	Connecticut	9–9–0

Quarterfinals; March 2
1	Salem State	5
8	Connecticut	2
2	Babson	9
7	Saint Anselm	2
3	Merrimack	3
6	Bowdoin	5
4	Norwich	7
5	Holy Cross	4

Semifinals; March 5
1	Salem State	6
6	Bowdoin	5
2	Babson	5
4	Norwich	2

Championship; March 8
1	Salem State	7
2	Babson	1

Note: * denotes overtime period(s)

== 1986 ==
Seed	School	Conference record	Seed	School	Conference record
1	Bowdoin	19–5–0	5	Norwich	13–8–1
2	Merrimack	16–4–2	6	Connecticut	12–10–0
3	Babson	14–6–1	7	Colby	11–9–2
4	Salem State	17–8–0	8	North Adams State	12–10–0

Quarterfinals; March 1
1	Bowdoin	7
8	North Adams State	1
2	Merrimack	7
7	Colby	3
3	Babson	4
6	Connecticut	2
4	Salem State	2
5	Norwich	8

Semifinals; March 2
1	Bowdoin	5
5	Norwich	2
2	Merrimack	2
3	Babson	3**

Championship; March 7
1	Bowdoin	6
3	Babson	3

Note: * denotes overtime period(s)

== 1987 ==
Seed	School	Conference record	Seed	School	Conference record
1	Merrimack	22–2–0	5	Norwich	12–8–0
2	Bowdoin	19–3–0	6	Saint Anselm	13–12–0
3	Babson	15–6–0	7	Holy Cross	13–13–0
4	Salem State	17–9–1	8	Connecticut	10–9–2

Quarterfinals; February 28
1	Merrimack	6
8	Connecticut	2
2	Bowdoin	8
7	Holy Cross	2
3	Babson	3
6	Saint Anselm	2
4	Salem State	3
5	Norwich	4

Semifinals; March 4
1	Merrimack	3
5	Norwich	2
2	Bowdoin	3
3	Babson	6

Championship; March 7
1	Merrimack	3
3	Babson	0

Note: * denotes overtime period(s)

== 1988 ==
Seed	School	Conference record	Seed	School	Conference record
1	Merrimack	22–0–0	5	Salem State	18–9–0
2	Babson	19–5–0	6	American International	16–8–0
3	Bowdoin	15–6–0	7	Massachusetts–Boston	11–8–0
4	Norwich	15–6–0	8	Holy Cross	12–14–0

Quarterfinals; February 27
1	Merrimack	7
8	Holy Cross	1
2	Babson	5
7	Massachusetts–Boston	0
3	Bowdoin	4*
6	American International	2
4	Norwich	3
5	Salem State	4

Semifinals; March 2
1	Merrimack	7
5	Salem State	2
2	Babson	2
3	Bowdoin	3

Championship; March 5
1	Merrimack	4
3	Bowdoin	1

Note: * denotes overtime period(s)

== 1989 ==
Seed	School	Conference record	Seed	School	Conference record
1	Merrimack	16–2–0	5	Massachusetts–Boston	12–8–1
2	Bowdoin	17–2–1	6	Salem State	11–9–0
3	American International	20–3–0	7	Middlebury	7–8–0
4	Babson	17–7–0	8	-	-

Quarterfinals; February 25
1	Merrimack
-	Bye	-
2	Bowdoin	5
7	Middlebury	1
3	American International	4
6	Salem State	3
4	Babson	2
5	Massachusetts–Boston	6

Semifinals; March 1
1	Merrimack	12
5	Massachusetts–Boston	1
2	Bowdoin	7
3	American International	4

Championship; March 4
1	Merrimack	9
2	Bowdoin	4

Note: * denotes overtime period(s)

== 1990 ==
Seed	School	Conference record	Seed	School	Conference record
1	Babson	15–1–4	5	Norwich	10–8–4
2	Middlebury	14–4–1	6	Connecticut	11–8–1
3	Bowdoin	12–4–2	7	Salem State	11–10–1
4	American International	15–6–1	8	-	-

Quarterfinals; February 27
1	Babson
-	Bye	-
2	Middlebury	4
7	Salem State	3
3	Bowdoin	6
6	Connecticut	4
4	American International	6
5	Norwich	5

Semifinals; March 2
1	Babson	2
4	American International	5
2	Middlebury	5
3	Bowdoin	2

Championship; March 5
4	American International	8
2	Middlebury	6

Note: * denotes overtime period(s)

== 1991 ==
Seed	School	Conference record	Seed	School	Conference record
1	Middlebury	17–2–1	5	Connecticut	12–5–2
2	Massachusetts–Boston	14–4–1	6	American International	12–9–2
3	Babson	14–6–0	7	Williams	9–6–4
4	Salem State	15–5–1	8	Bowdoin	8–11–2

Quarterfinals
1	Middlebury	4*
8	Bowdoin	3
2	Massachusetts–Boston	2
7	Williams	3
3	Babson	3
6	American International	2
4	Salem State	8
5	Connecticut	7

Semifinals
1	Middlebury	2
7	Williams	0
3	Babson	4
4	Salem State	3

Championship
1	Middlebury	1
3	Babson	0

Note: * denotes overtime period(s)

== 1992 ==
Seed	School	Conference record	Seed	School	Conference record
1	Connecticut	19–3–1	5	Bowdoin	14–8–0
2	Middlebury	19–4–0	6	Norwich	11–9–3
3	Salem State	12–3–0	7	Massachusetts–Boston	9–9–0
4	Babson	16–3–3	8	-	-

Quarterfinals
1	Connecticut	-
-	bye	-
2	Middlebury	6
7	Massachusetts–Boston	2
3	Salem State	5
6	Norwich	7
4	Babson	7
5	Bowdoin	3

Semifinals
1	Connecticut	5
6	Norwich	1
2	Middlebury	1
4	Babson	4

Championship
1	Connecticut	1
4	Babson	4

Note: * denotes overtime period(s)

== 1993 ==
Seed	School	Conference record	Seed	School	Conference record
1	Middlebury	18–2–2	5	American International	13–7–2
2	Babson	17–4–1	6	Hamilton	13–9–1
3	Connecticut	13–5–0	7	Salem State	10–4–1
4	Williams	16–6–0	8	Bowdoin	13–8–2

Quarterfinals; March 2
1	Middlebury	1
8	Bowdoin	2
2	Babson	4
7	Salem State	5
3	Connecticut	5
6	Hamilton	3
4	Williams	6
5	American International	2

Semifinals; March 5
3	Connecticut	1
8	Bowdoin	6
4	Williams	4
7	Salem State	5

Championship; March 6
8	Bowdoin	6
7	Salem State	2

Note: * denotes overtime period(s)

== 1994 ==
Seed	School	Conference record	Seed	School	Conference record
1	Salem State	12–3–2	5	Hamilton	11–6–0
2	Bowdoin	12–3–2	6	Colby	10–5–2
3	Connecticut	11–3–3	7	American International	10–7–0
4	Saint Anselm	11–3–3	8	Holy Cross	10–7–0

Note: Williams passed on the ECAC tournament in order to play in the NCAA tournament.

Quarterfinals; March 1
1	Salem State	8
8	Holy Cross	3
2	Bowdoin	10
7	American International	0
3	Connecticut	5
6	Colby	4
4	Saint Anselm	4
5	Hamilton	5*

Semifinals; March 4
1	Salem State	4
5	Hamilton	3
2	Bowdoin	5
3	Connecticut	2

Championship; March 5
1	Salem State	6
2	Bowdoin	3

Note: * denotes overtime period(s)

== 1995 ==
Seed	School	Conference record	Seed	School	Conference record
1	Bowdoin	12–4–1	5	Colby	10–6–1
2	Connecticut	10–2–5	6	Babson	10–7–0
3	Williams	11–3–3	7	Hamilton	10–7–0
4	Salem State	12–5–0	8	Holy Cross	10–7–0

Note: Middlebury passed on the ECAC tournament in order to play in the NCAA tournament.

Quarterfinals; February 28
1	Bowdoin	6
8	Holy Cross	0
2	Connecticut	9
7	Hamilton	4
3	Williams	4
6	Babson	5
4	Salem State	9
5	Colby	2

Semifinals; March 3
1	Bowdoin	3
6	Babson	0
2	Connecticut	3
4	Salem State	4

Championship; March 4
1	Bowdoin	1
4	Salem State	7

Note: * denotes overtime period(s)

== 1996 ==
Seed	School	Conference record	Seed	School	Conference record
1	Salem State	14–5–0	5	Hamilton	10–8–1
2	Babson	13–4–2	6	Williams	10–8–1
3	Amherst	13–6–0	7	Connecticut	10–8–1
4	Connecticut College	12–6–1	8	Holy Cross	9–8–2

Note: Middlebury, Colby and Bowdoin passed on the ECAC tournament in order to play in the NCAA tournament.

Quarterfinals; February 27
1	Salem State	7
8	Holy Cross	2
2	Babson	7
7	Connecticut	5
3	Amherst	4
6	Williams	3
4	Connecticut College	3
5	Hamilton	9

Semifinals; March 1
1	Salem State	3
5	Hamilton	8
2	Babson	2
3	Amherst	3

Championship; March 2
5	Hamilton	4
3	Amherst	5*

Note: * denotes overtime period(s)

== 1997 ==
Seed	School	Conference record	Seed	School	Conference record
1	Norwich	15–3–1	6	Saint Anselm	10–6–1
2	Williams	14–4–1	7	Bowdoin	11–8–0
3	Hamilton	14–4–1	8	Holy Cross	11–8–0
4	Colby	13–5–1	9	Babson	9–9–1
5	Amherst	11–7–1	10	Trinity	9–10–0

Note: Middlebury passed on the ECAC tournament in order to play in the NCAA tournament.

First Round; February 26
7	Bowdoin	5
10	Trinity	3
8	Holy Cross	1
9	Babson	0

Quarterfinals; March 1
1	Norwich	3
8	Holy Cross	2
2	Williams	1
7	Bowdoin	2**
3	Hamilton	5
6	Saint Anselm	0
4	Colby	3
5	Amherst	1

Semifinals; March 7
1	Norwich	4
7	Bowdoin	5*
3	Hamilton	1
4	Colby	10

Championship; March 8
7	Bowdoin	2
4	Colby	3

Note: * denotes overtime period(s)

== 1998 ==
Seed	School	Conference record	Seed	School	Conference record
1	Holy Cross	13–4–2	6	Colby	10–6–3
2	Connecticut College	11–5–3	7	Connecticut	10–8–1
3	Hamilton	11–5–3	8	Babson	9–8–2
4	Bowdoin	11–6–2	9	Norwich	9–8–2
5	Salem State	11–6–2	10	Trinity	9–8–2

Note: Middlebury and Williams passed on the ECAC tournament in order to play in the NCAA tournament.

First Round; February 25
7	Connecticut	3
10	Trinity	1
8	Babson	0
9	Norwich	5

Quarterfinals; February 28
1	Holy Cross	3
9	Norwich	5
2	Connecticut College	8
7	Connecticut	3
3	Hamilton	3*
6	Colby	2
4	Bowdoin	1
5	Salem State	5

Semifinals; March 6
2	Connecticut College	7*
9	Norwich	6
3	Hamilton	6
5	Salem State	2

Championship; March 7
2	Connecticut College	1
3	Hamilton	2*

Note: * denotes overtime period(s)

== 1999 ==
Seed	School	Conference record	Seed	School	Conference record
1	Norwich	15–1–1	6	Connecticut College	9–7–1
2	Williams	12–4–1	7	New England College	8–7–2
3	Colby	9–4–4	8	Massachusetts–Boston	8–8–1
4	Trinity	11–6–0	9	Salem State	7–9–1
5	Hamilton	9–6–2	10	Babson	5–9–3

Note: Middlebury and Amherst passed on the ECAC tournament in order to play in the NCAA tournament.

First Round; February 24
7	New England College	3
10	Babson	2
8	Massachusetts–Boston	2
9	Salem State	1

Quarterfinals; February 27
1	Norwich	5
8	Massachusetts–Boston	3
2	Williams	8
7	New England College	3
3	Colby	5
6	Connecticut College	0
4	Trinity	5
5	Hamilton	1

Semifinals; March 5
1	Norwich	9
4	Trinity	3
2	Williams	3
3	Colby	1

Championship; March 6
1	Norwich	7
2	Williams	3

Note: * denotes overtime period(s)

== 2000 ==
Seed	School	Conference record	Seed	School	Conference record
1	Norwich	16–0–1	5	New England College	5–9–3
2	Salem State	8–7–2	6	MCLA	3–14–0
3	Massachusetts–Boston	7–10–0	7	Skidmore	2–14–1
4	Southern Maine	6–10–1	8	Babson	1–15–1

Quarterfinals; February 26
1	Norwich	7
8	Babson	4
2	Salem State	6
7	Skidmore	1
3	Massachusetts–Boston	6
6	MCLA	1
4	Southern Maine	3
5	New England College	7

Semifinals; March 3
1	Norwich	6
5	New England College	1
2	Salem State	3
3	Massachusetts–Boston	1

Championship; March 4
1	Norwich	3
2	Salem State	2

Note: * denotes overtime period(s)

== 2001 ==
Seed	School	Conference record	Seed	School	Conference record
1	Norwich	13–3–1	5	Skidmore	5–10–2
2	Salem State	10–5–2	6	Massachusetts–Boston	2–13–2
3	New England College	10–7–0	7	Southern Maine	2–14–1
4	Babson	8–6–3	8	MCLA	1–16–0

Quarterfinals; February 26
1	Norwich	3
8	MCLA	0
2	Salem State	5
7	Southern Maine	2
3	New England College	5
6	Massachusetts–Boston	3
4	Babson	3
5	Skidmore	2

Semifinals; March 3
1	Norwich	10
4	Babson	3
2	Salem State	1
3	New England College	4

Championship; March 4
1	Norwich	1
3	New England College	2

Note: * denotes overtime period(s) | class="col-break col-break-2" |

== 2002 ==
Seed	School	Conference record	Seed	School	Conference record
1	Norwich	15–4–0	5	Southern Maine	7–9–3
2	New England College	9–8–2	6	Babson	5–11–3
3	MCLA	8–8–3	7	Massachusetts–Boston	3–14–2
4	Salem State	9–9–1	8	Skidmore	2–14–3

Quarterfinals; February 23
1	Norwich	5
8	Skidmore	1
2	New England College	4
7	Massachusetts–Boston	2
3	MCLA	4
6	Babson	2
4	Salem State	3
5	Southern Maine	2

Semifinals; March 1
1	Norwich	1*
4	Salem State	0
2	New England College	1
3	MCLA	3

Championship; March 2
1	Norwich	10
3	MCLA	1

Note: * denotes overtime period(s)

== 2003 ==
Seed	School	Conference record	Seed	School	Conference record
1	Norwich	16–3–0	5	Skidmore	6–12–1
2	New England College	15–4–0	6	MCLA	3–14–2
3	Babson	10–6–3	7	Southern Maine	3–14–2
4	Salem State	9–7–3	8	Massachusetts–Boston	0–18–1

Quarterfinals; March 1
1	Norwich	12
8	Massachusetts–Boston	0
2	New England College	8
7	Southern Maine	1
3	Babson	7
6	MCLA	5
4	Salem State	6
5	Skidmore	1

Semifinals; March 5
1	Norwich	5
4	Salem State	1
2	New England College	5
3	Babson	1

Championship; March 8
1	Norwich	6
2	New England College	2

Note: * denotes overtime period(s)

== 2004 ==
Seed	School	Conference record	Seed	School	Conference record
1	Norwich	16–2–0	5	Southern Maine	6–11–1
2	New England College	12–4–2	6	Skidmore	5–12–1
3	Babson	9–8–1	7	Massachusetts–Boston	0–18–0
4	Salem State	7–9–2		-	-

Note: As the top seed, Norwich served as host for the semifinal and championship rounds.

Quarterfinals; February 28
1	Norwich
-	bye
2	New England College	9
7	Massachusetts–Boston	1
3	Babson	6
6	Skidmore	1
4	Salem State	6
5	Southern Maine	1

Semifinals; March 3
1	Norwich	7
4	Salem State	4
2	New England College	2
3	Babson	3

Championship; March 6
1	Norwich	2*
2	Babson	1

Note: * denotes overtime period(s)

== 2005 ==
Seed	School	Conference record	Seed	School	Conference record
1	Norwich	15–2–2	5	Salem State	6–10–3
2	Babson	13–3–3	6	Skidmore	5–13–1
3	Southern Maine	11–7–1	7	Massachusetts–Boston	2–16–1
4	New England College	11–8–0	8	Castleton State	0–19–0

Note: As the top seed in the semifinal, Norwich served as host for the semifinal and championship rounds.

Quarterfinals; February 26
1	Norwich	16
8	Castleton State	0
2	Babson	8
7	Massachusetts–Boston	0
3	Southern Maine	6
6	Skidmore	1
4	New England College	7
5	Salem State	1

Semifinals; March 2
1	Norwich	5
4	New England College	6*
2	Babson	5
3	Southern Maine	3

Championship; March 5
4	New England College	6
2	Babson	4

Note: * denotes overtime period(s)

== 2006 ==
Seed	School	Conference record	Seed	School	Conference record
1	Norwich	15–2–2	5	Salem State	7–8–4
2	Babson	14–5–0	6	Skidmore	5–13–1
3	New England College	11–5–3	7	Castleton State	1–15–3
4	Southern Maine	9–8–2	8	Massachusetts–Boston	0–17–2

Note: As the top seed in the semifinal, Norwich served as host for the semifinal and championship rounds.

Quarterfinals; February 25
1	Norwich	8
8	Massachusetts–Boston	1
2	Babson	4
7	Castleton State	1
3	New England College	11
6	Skidmore	1
4	Southern Maine	3
5	Salem State	1

Semifinals; March 4
1	Norwich	5
4	Southern Maine	3
2	Babson	0
3	New England College	4

Championship; March 5
1	Norwich	5
3	New England College	2

Note: * denotes overtime period(s)

== 2007 ==
Seed	School	Conference record	Seed	School	Conference record
1	Norwich	14–5–0	5	Castleton State	11–4–4
2	New England College	13–5–1	6	Babson	11–7–1
3	Skidmore	12–5–2	7	Salem State	5–14–0
4	Southern Maine	12–5–2	8	Massachusetts–Boston	3–16–0

Note: As the top seed in the semifinal, Norwich served as host for the semifinal and championship rounds.

Quarterfinals; February 24
1	Norwich	8
8	Massachusetts–Boston	2
2	New England College	4
7	Salem State	3
3	Skidmore	4
6	Babson	5*
4	Southern Maine	2
5	Castleton State	3*

Semifinals; March 3
1	Norwich	1
6	Babson	4
2	New England College	3
5	Castleton State	2

Championship; March 4
6	Babson	5
2	New England College	3

Note: * denotes overtime period(s)

== 2008 ==
Seed	School	Conference record	Seed	School	Conference record
1	Norwich	15–4–0	5	Southern Maine	8–8–3
2	Babson	13–4–2	6	Salem State	9–9–1
3	Castleton State	11–6–2	7	Massachusetts–Boston	5–12–2
4	New England College	10–6–3	8	Skidmore	4–14–1

Note: As the top seed in the semifinal, Norwich served as host for the semifinal and championship rounds.

Quarterfinals; March 1
1	Norwich	8
8	Skidmore	0
2	Babson	1
7	Massachusetts–Boston	4
3	Castleton State	3
6	Salem State	6
4	New England College	5
5	Southern Maine	2

Semifinals; March 8
1	Norwich	5
7	Massachusetts–Boston	2
4	New England College	2
6	Salem State	4

Championship; March 9
1	Norwich	8
6	Salem State	2

Note: * denotes overtime period(s)

== 2009 ==
Seed	School	Conference record	Seed	School	Conference record
1	Norwich	11–5–3	5	Southern Maine	8–8–3
2	Castleton State	11–6–2	6	Skidmore	8–8–3
3	Salem State	10–8–1	7	Babson	9–10–0
4	New England College	9–8–2	8	Massachusetts–Boston	4–14–1

Note: As the top seed in the semifinal, New England College served as host for the semifinal and championship rounds.

Quarterfinals; February 28
1	Norwich	0
8	Massachusetts–Boston	1*
2	Castleton State	1
7	Babson	4
3	Salem State	3
6	Skidmore	4
4	New England College	4*
5	Southern Maine	3

Semifinals; March 6
4	New England College	4
8	Massachusetts–Boston	5
6	Skidmore	2
7	Babson	3

Championship; March 7
8	Massachusetts–Boston	3
7	Babson	4*

Note: * denotes overtime period(s)

== 2010 ==
Seed	School	Conference record	Seed	School	Conference record
1	Norwich	16–1–2	5	Skidmore	7–10–2
2	Babson	9–9–1	6	New England College	6–11–2
3	Castleton State	7–9–3	7	Massachusetts–Boston	6–11–2
4	Southern Maine	7–9–3	8	University of New England	2–17–0

Note: As the top seed in the semifinal, Norwich served as host for the semifinal and championship rounds.

Quarterfinals; February 27
1	Norwich	8
8	University of New England	1
2	Babson	4
7	Massachusetts–Boston	2
3	Castleton State	1
6	New England College	6
4	Southern Maine	3
5	Skidmore	6

Semifinals; March 5
1	Norwich	3
6	New England College	1
2	Babson	3
5	Skidmore	0

Championship; March 6
1	Norwich	4
2	Babson	1

Note: * denotes overtime period(s)

== 2011 ==
Seed	School	Conference record	Seed	School	Conference record
1	Norwich	15–1–3	5	Babson	7–9–3
2	Castleton State	15–3–1	6	Southern Maine	5–11–3
3	Massachusetts–Boston	10–9–0	7	New England College	5–13–1
4	Skidmore	8–8–3	8	University of New England	3–16–0

Note: As the top seed in the semifinal, Norwich served as host for the semifinal and championship rounds.

Quarterfinals; February 26
1	Norwich	10
8	University of New England	2
2	Castleton State	5
7	New England College	1
3	Massachusetts–Boston	1
6	Southern Maine	4
4	Skidmore	0
5	Babson	5

Semifinals; March 4
1	Norwich	4
6	Southern Maine	0
2	Castleton State	3
5	Babson	4

Championship; March 5
1	Norwich	3*
5	Babson	2

Note: * denotes overtime period(s)

== 2012 ==
Seed	School	Conference record	Seed	School	Conference record
1	Norwich	15–2–1	5	Massachusetts–Boston	9–8–1
2	Castleton State	12–4–2	6	Southern Maine	7–7–4
3	Babson	9–5–4	7	New England College	6–8–4
4	Skidmore	10–8–0	8	University of New England	2–16–0

Note: As the top seed in the semifinal, Norwich served as host for the semifinal and championship rounds.

Quarterfinals; February 25
1	Norwich	5
8	University of New England	0
2	Castleton State	2
7	New England College	1
3	Babson	1
6	Southern Maine	2
4	Skidmore	3
5	Massachusetts–Boston	2

Semifinals; March 2
1	Norwich	3
6	Southern Maine	2
2	Castleton State	4
4	Skidmore	0

Championship; March 3
1	Norwich	11
2	Castleton State	1

Note: * denotes overtime period(s)

== 2013 ==
Seed	School	Conference record	Seed	School	Conference record
1	Norwich	16–1–1	5	New England College	7–8–3
2	Massachusetts–Boston	11–5–2	6	Skidmore	8–9–1
3	Babson	9–7–2	7	University of New England	4–13–1
4	Castleton State	9–8–1	8	Southern Maine	4–14–0

Note: As the top seed in the semifinal, Norwich served as host for the semifinal and championship rounds.

Quarterfinals; February 23
1	Norwich	2
8	Southern Maine	0
2	Massachusetts–Boston	5
7	University of New England	2
3	Babson	7
6	Skidmore	1
4	Castleton State	6
5	New England College	1

Semifinals; March 1
1	Norwich	6
4	Castleton State	2
2	Massachusetts–Boston	3
3	Babson	4*

Championship; March 2
1	Norwich	1
3	Babson	6

Note: * denotes overtime period(s)

== 2014 ==
Seed	School	Conference record	Seed	School	Conference record
1	Norwich	13–3–2	5	Castleton State	8–7–3
2	Babson	13–3–2	6	University of New England	7–11–0
3	Massachusetts–Boston	9–5–4	7	Southern Maine	5–11–2
4	New England College	10–8–0	8	Skidmore	3–9–6

Quarterfinals; February 22
1	Norwich	6
8	Skidmore	0
2	Babson	6
7	Southern Maine	2
3	Massachusetts–Boston	7
6	University of New England	2
4	New England College	2
5	Castleton State	3*

Semifinals; March 1
1	Norwich	4
5	Castleton State	3
2	Babson	4
3	Massachusetts–Boston	2

Championship; March 8
1	Norwich	1
2	Babson	2

Note: * denotes overtime period(s)

== 2015 ==
Seed	School	Conference record	Seed	School	Conference record
1	Norwich	17–1–0	5	University of New England	7–9–2
2	Massachusetts–Boston	16–2–0	6	New England College	6–9–3
3	Babson	12–4–2	7	Skidmore	3–14–1
4	Castleton State	8–10–0	8	Southern Maine	3–14–1

Quarterfinals; February 21
1	Norwich	4
8	Southern Maine	0
2	Massachusetts–Boston	11
7	Skidmore	1
3	Babson	3
6	New England College	1
4	Castleton State	3*
5	University of New England	2

Semifinals; February 28
1	Norwich	2
4	Castleton State	1
2	Massachusetts–Boston	2
3	Babson	5

Championship; March 7
1	Norwich	3*
3	Babson	2

Note: * denotes overtime period(s)

== 2016 ==
Seed	School	Conference record	Seed	School	Conference record
1	Massachusetts–Boston	14–2–2	5	New England College	6–6–6
2	Babson	13–3–2	6	Castleton	7–9–2
3	Norwich	11–5–2	7	Skidmore	5–10–3
4	University of New England	9–7–2	8	Southern Maine	5–13–0

Quarterfinals; February 20
1	Massachusetts–Boston	4
8	Southern Maine	0
2	Babson	5
7	Skidmore	2
3	Norwich	4
6	Castleton	1
4	University of New England	4
5	New England College	1

Semifinals; February 27
1	Massachusetts–Boston	6
4	University of New England	3
2	Babson	5
3	Norwich	0

Championship; March 5
1	Massachusetts–Boston	3*
2	Babson	2

Note: * denotes overtime period(s)

=== Quarterfinals ===
==== (1) Massachusetts–Boston vs. (8) Southern Maine ====
February 20	Massachusetts–Boston	4 – 0	Southern Maine	Edward T. Barry Ice Rink	Recap
No scoring		First period	No scoring
10:38 – Albee Daley (8)		Second period	No scoring
11:28 – pp – Frankie DeAugustine (14); 16:28 – Frankie DeAugustine (15); 19:02 – en – Garrett Gallagher (2)		Third period	No scoring
Billy Faust (20 saves / 20 shots)		Goalie stats	Kyle Shapiro (47 saves / 50 shots)

==== (2) Babson vs. (7) Skidmore ====
February 20	Babson	5 – 2	Skidmore	Babson Skating Center	Recap
05:49 – pp – Jared Wiedemann (2); 13:41 – pp – Matt Brazel (8)		First period	No scoring
15:13 – pp – Tommy Munichiello (9)		Second period	No scoring
05:45 – Billy Seligman (8); 09:56 – pp – Max Franklin (5)		Third period	Ondrej Krajňák (4) – 03:23; Christian Leahy (2) – 14:53
Jamie Murray (30 saves / 32 shots)		Goalie stats	Jack McDonald (44 saves / 49 shots)

==== (3) Babson vs. (6) Skidmore ====
February 20	Castleton	1 – 4	Norwich	Spartan Arena	Recap
No scoring		First period	No scoring
Will Laking (9) – pp – 07:14		Second period	12:27 – Austin Evans (2); 14:53 – William Pelletier (9)
No scoring		Third period	13:46 – Paul Russell (13); 18:13 – pp – Kevin Salvucci (16)
Ryan Mulder (39 saves / 43 shots)		Goalie stats	Braeden Ostepchuk (21 saves / 22 shots)

==== (4) University of New England vs. (5) New England College ====
February 20	University of New England	4 – 1	New England College	Harold Alfond Forum	Recap
14:02 – Kyle Williams (3); 14:20 – Nick Wirth (3)		First period	Kyle Arenson (4) – 19:57
18:40 – Brady Fleurent (12)		Second period	No scoring
16:31 – Armand Uomoleale (11)		Third period	No scoring
Connor Maloney (38 saves / 39 shots)		Goalie stats	Brett Kilar (32 saves / 36 shots)

=== Semifinals ===
==== (1) Massachusetts–Boston vs. (4) University of New England ====
February 27	Massachusetts–Boston	6 – 3	University of New England	Edward T. Barry Ice Rink	Recap
16:32 – John Bonno (1); 17:26 – pp – Albee Daley (9)		First period	Armand Uomoleale (12) – pp – 11:34
03:41 – Andrew Crawford (1); 12:19 – Drew Gannon (5); 16:53 – sh – Albee Daley (10)		Second period	Ryan Quinn (9) – pp – 02:59; Brady Fleurent (13) – 10:31
19:54 – en – Albee Daley (11)		Third period	No scoring
Billy Faust (25 saves / 28 shots)		Goalie stats	Connor Maloney (42 saves / 47 shots)

==== (2) Babson vs. (3) Norwich ====
February 27	Babson	5 – 0	Norwich	Babson Skating Center	Recap
01:49 – Ryan Gouveia (1)		First period	No scoring
07:59 – Michael Phillips (4)		Second period	No scoring
05:06 – pp – Charlie Ackerman (12); 07:51 – Dan Casey (9); 13:47 – Rob Devaney (9)		Third period	No scoring
Jamie Murray (24 saves / 24 shots)		Goalie stats	Braeden Ostepchuk (34 saves / 38 shots); Ty Reichenbach (2 saves / 3 shots)

=== Finals ===
==== (1) Massachusetts–Boston vs. (2) Babson ====
March 5	Massachusetts–Boston	3 – 2	OT	Babson	Edward T. Barry Ice Rink	Recap
No scoring		First period		Ryan Gouveia (2) – 17:35
09:40 – Andrew Crawford (2)		Second period		Bobby Hall (2) – 10:34
06:16 – Alex Demchuk (5)		Third period		No scoring
12:51 – Colin Larkin (10)		First overtime period		No scoring
Billy Faust (33 saves / 35 shots)		Goalie stats		Jamie Murray (42 saves / 45 shots)

== 2017 ==
Seed	School	Conference record	Seed	School	Conference record
1	Norwich	16–1–1	5	Skidmore	9–6–3
2	New England College	13–5–0	6	Massachusetts–Boston	7–9–2
3	Babson	11–5–2	7	Southern Maine	5–12–1
4	Castleton	9–5–4	-	-	-

Quarterfinals; February 18
2	New England College	3
7	Southern Maine	0
3	Babson	7
6	Massachusetts–Boston	3
4	Castleton	7
5	Skidmore	2

Semifinals; February 25
1	Norwich	5
4	Castleton	2
2	New England College	3*
3	Babson	2

Championship; March 4
1	Norwich	4
2	New England College	1

Note: * denotes overtime period(s)

== 2018 ==
Seed	School	Conference record	Seed	School	Conference record
1	Norwich	13–3–2	5	New England College	7–10–1
2	Hobart	12–3–3	6	Skidmore	4–12–2
3	Babson	12–4–2	7	Southern Maine	3–12–3
4	Massachusetts–Boston	11–7–0	8	Castleton	3–14–1

Quarterfinals; February 17
1	Norwich	2**
8	Castleton	1
2	Hobart	8
7	Southern Maine	0
3	Babson	3**
6	Skidmore	2
4	Massachusetts–Boston	5
5	New England College	3

Semifinals; February 24
1	Norwich	6
4	Massachusetts–Boston	3
2	Hobart	3
3	Babson	2

Championship; March 3
1	Norwich	0
2	Hobart	3

Note: * denotes overtime period(s)

== 2019 ==
Seed	School	Conference record	Seed	School	Conference record
1	Massachusetts–Boston	14–3–1	5	New England College	9–4–5
2	Norwich	13–4–1	6	Skidmore	9–6–3
3	Babson	11–4–3	7	Suffolk	5–13–0
4	Hobart	11–5–2	8	Southern Maine	4–13–1

Quarterfinals; February 16
1	Massachusetts–Boston	4
8	Southern Maine	0
2	Norwich	1
7	Suffolk	0
3	Babson	2
6	Skidmore	1
4	Hobart	4
5	New England College	1

Semifinals; February 23
1	Massachusetts–Boston	0
4	Hobart	4
2	Norwich	5
3	Babson	3

Championship; March 2
4	Hobart	1
2	Norwich	2

Note: * denotes overtime period(s)

== 2020 ==
Seed	School	Conference record	Seed	School	Conference record
1	Norwich	16–1–1	5	Massachusetts–Boston	10–7–1
2	Babson	13–4–1	6	Skidmore	7–9–2
3	Hobart	12–4–2	7	Southern Maine	6–10–2
4	New England College	12–6–0	8	Castleton	4–12–2

Quarterfinals; February 22
1	Norwich	9
8	Castleton	0
2	Babson	2
7	Southern Maine	3
3	Hobart	4
6	Skidmore	2
4	New England College	4
5	Massachusetts–Boston	1

Semifinals; February 29
1	Norwich	5
7	Southern Maine	0
3	Hobart	4
3	New England College	2

Championship; March 7
1	Norwich	3
3	Hobart	0

Note: * denotes overtime period(s)

== 2022 ==
Seed	School	Conference record	Seed	School	Conference record
1	Hobart	13–2–2–2–1	6	Skidmore	9–7–2–1–1
2	Elmira	11–4–2–1–0	7	New England College	7–10–1–1–2
3	Massachusetts–Boston	10–4–4–0–1	8	Southern Maine	5–10–1–1–1
4	Babson	11–5–2–1–1	9	Castleton	1–15–2–0–2
5	Norwich	9–5–4–2–1	10	Johnson & Wales	2–16–0–0–0

First Round; February 16
8	Southern Maine	2*
9	Castleton	1
7	New England College	2*
10	Johnson & Wales	1

Quarterfinals; February 19
1	Hobart	5
8	Southern Maine	2
2	Elmira	7
7	New England College	1
3	Massachusetts–Boston	3
6	Skidmore	5
4	Babson	2*
5	Norwich	1

Semifinals; February 26
1	Hobart	2
6	Skidmore	3
2	Elmira	2
4	Babson	3*

Championship; March 5
6	Skidmore	3
4	Babson	5

Note: * denotes overtime period(s)

== 2023 ==
Seed	School	Conference record	Seed	School	Conference record
1	Hobart	16–2–0–0–0	5	Skidmore	9–7–2–1–1
2	Norwich	14–2–2–2–0	6	Massachusetts–Boston	8–10–0–0–2
3	Babson	10–6–2–0–0	7	New England College	7–10–1–0–0
4	Elmira	10–7–1–0–1	8	Castleton	7–11–0–1–0

Quarterfinals; February 18
1	Hobart	7
8	Castleton	3
2	Norwich	2
7	New England College	1
3	Babson	5
6	Massachusetts–Boston	1
4	Elmira	3
5	Skidmore	4*

Semifinals; February 25
1	Hobart	1
5	Skidmore	0
2	Norwich	0
3	Babson	4

Championship; March 4
1	Hobart	5
3	Babson	1

Note: * denotes overtime period(s)

== 2024 ==
Seed	School	Conference record	Seed	School	Conference record
1	Hobart	16–1–1–0–0	5	Babson	12–5–1–3–0
2	Norwich	11–4–3–0–1	6	Massachusetts–Boston	7–11–0–0–1
3	Skidmore	12–5–1–0–0	7	Southern Maine	6–9–3–1–1
4	Elmira	11–6–1–1–1	8	Vermont State Castleton	4–14–0–1–1

Quarterfinals; February 17
1	Hobart	8
8	Vermont State Castleton	1
2	Norwich	1
7	Southern Maine	3
3	Skidmore	5
6	Massachusetts–Boston	1
4	Elmira	3*
5	Babson	2

Semifinals; February 24
1	Hobart	4
7	Southern Maine	0
3	Skidmore	4
4	Elmira	1

Championship; March 2
1	Hobart	5
3	Skidmore	0

Note: * denotes overtime period(s)

== 2025 ==
Seed	School	Conference record	Seed	School	Conference record
1	Hobart	18–1–1–0–1	5	Salve Regina	10–10–0–2–4
2	Norwich	12–6–2–1–0	6	New England College	9–10–1–0–1
3	Babson	11–8–1–0–2	7	Elmira	10–9–1–4–0
4	Skidmore	11–9–0–0–0	8	Albertus Magnus	9–10–1–3–2

Quarterfinals; March 1
1	Hobart	3
8	Albertus Magnus	1
2	Norwich	3
7	Elmira	2
3	Babson	0
6	New England College	2
4	Skidmore	4*
5	Salve Regina	3

Semifinals; March 8
1	Hobart	2
6	New England College	0
2	Norwich	3
4	Skidmore	2

Championship; March 9
1	Hobart	5
2	Norwich	2

Note: * denotes overtime period(s)

== Championships ==
School	Championships
Norwich	14
Babson	6
Hobart	4
Merrimack	3
Salem State	3
Bowdoin	2
New England College	2
American International	1
Amherst	1
Colby	1
Hamilton	1
Massachusetts Boston	1
Middlebury	1

== See also ==
- ECAC 2 Tournament
- Little East Conference men's ice hockey tournament
