= 2019–20 RIT Tigers men's ice hockey season =

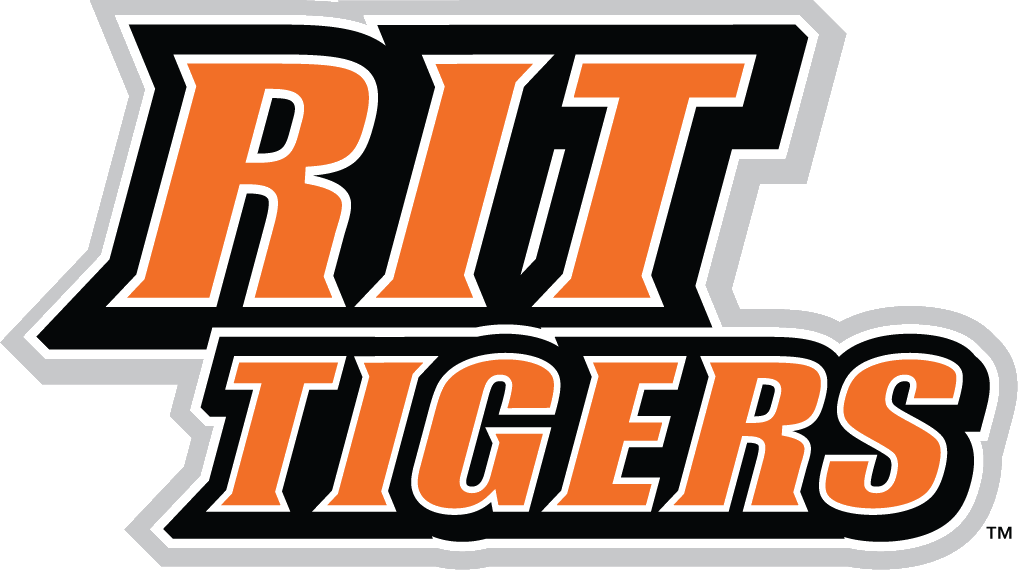
- Conference: 3rd Atlantic Hockey
- Home ice: Gene Polisseni Center

Rankings
- USCHO.com: NR
- USA Today/ US Hockey Magazine: NR

Record
- Overall: 19–13–4
- Conference: 15–9–4–1
- Home: 10–4–3
- Road: 8–8–1
- Neutral: 1–1–0

Coaches and captains
- Head coach: Wayne Wilson
- Assistant coaches: Brian Hills; David Insalaco; Len Perno
- Captain(s): Adam Brubacher; Darren Brady
- Alternate captain(s): Shawn Cameron; Chris McKay

The 2019–20 RIT Tigers men's ice hockey season was the 56th season of play for the program, the 15th at the Division I level, and the 14th season in the Atlantic Hockey conference. The Tigers represented the Rochester Institute of Technology and were coached by Wayne Wilson, in his 21st season.

On March 12, 2020, Atlantic Hockey announced that the remainder of the conference tournament was cancelled due to the coronavirus pandemic.

== Roster ==
As of December 14, 2019

No.	Nat.	Player	Class	Pos	Height	Weight	DoB	Hometown	Previous team	NHL rights
1	(Canada)	Ian Andriano	Junior	G	6' 1" (1.85 m)	192 lb (87 kg)	1996-08-11	Barrie, Ontario	Ottawa Jr. Senators (CCHL)	—
2	(Canada)	Adam Brubacher (C)	Senior	D	6' 4" (1.93 m)	201 lb (91 kg)	1995-12-13	Elmira, Ontario	Powell River Kings (BCHL)	—
3	(Canada)	Spencer Berry	Sophomore	D	6' 1" (1.85 m)	191 lb (87 kg)	1998-09-26	White Rock, British Columbia	Langley Rivermen (BCHL)	—
4	(Canada)	Brody Valette	Senior	D	6' 0" (1.83 m)	182 lb (83 kg)	1995-11-03	Calgary, Alberta	Whitecourt Wolverines (AJHL)	—
5	(United States)	Dan Willett	Junior	D	5' 6" (1.68 m)	174 lb (79 kg)	1996-02-23	Bayville, New York	Bloomington Thunder (USHL)	—
6	(Canada)	Andrew Rinaldi	Freshman	F	6' 0" (1.83 m)	189 lb (86 kg)	1998-03-15	Montreal, Quebec	Wellington Dukes (OJHL)	—
7	(Canada)	Ryan Nicholson	Freshman	F	6' 2" (1.88 m)	190 lb (86 kg)	1999-01-14	Mississauga, Ontario	Oakville Blades (OJHL)	—
8	(Canada)	Will Calverley	Sophomore	F	5' 9" (1.75 m)	175 lb (79 kg)	1998-07-17	Scarborough, Ontario	Chilliwack Chiefs (BCHL)	—
9	(Canada)	Jake Joffe	Sophomore	F	5' 10" (1.78 m)	173 lb (78 kg)	1998-04-30	Toronto, Ontario	Toronto Jr. Canadiens (OJHL)	—
10	(Canada)	Kobe Walker	Sophomore	F	5' 9" (1.75 m)	173 lb (78 kg)	1998-04-03	Lloydminster, Alberta	Lloydminster Bobcats (AJHL)	—
11	(Canada)	Colton Trumbla	Freshman	F	6' 1" (1.85 m)	200 lb (91 kg)	1998-11-30	Winnipeg, Manitoba	St. Michael's Buzzers (OJHL)	—
12	(Canada)	Ryan Kruper	Senior	F	5' 11" (1.8 m)	195 lb (88 kg)	1995-01-19	Sherwood Park, Alberta	Sherwood Park Crusaders (AJHL)	—
14	(United States)	Jake Hamacher	Junior	F	5' 8" (1.73 m)	175 lb (79 kg)	1997-04-20	Corona, California	Dubuque Fighting Saints (USHL)	—
15	(Canada)	Shawn Cameron (A)	Senior	F	5' 11" (1.8 m)	194 lb (88 kg)	1995-08-30	Sherbrooke, Quebec	Cumberland Grads (CCHL)	—
16	(Canada)	Elijah Gonsalves	Freshman	F	5' 9" (1.75 m)	167 lb (76 kg)	2000-03-09	Toronto, Ontario	Wellington Dukes (CCHL)	—
17	(Canada)	Bryson Traptow	Junior	F	6' 3" (1.91 m)	191 lb (87 kg)	1997-04-17	Calgary, Alberta	Camrose Kodiaks (AJHL)	—
18	(Canada)	Zach Salloum	Sophomore	D	5' 8" (1.73 m)	172 lb (78 kg)	1997-03-27	Orleans, Ontario	Ottawa Jr. Senators (CCHL)	—
19	(Canada)	Nick Bruce	Junior	F	6' 0" (1.83 m)	181 lb (82 kg)	1996-09-02	Fall River, Nova Scotia	Johnstown Tomahawks (NAHL)	—
20	(United States)	Caleb Moretz	Freshman	F	5' 10" (1.78 m)	171 lb (78 kg)	1998-07-14	Fairbanks, Alaska	Flin Flon Bombers (SJHL)	—
21	(Canada)	Alden Dupuis	Junior	F	5' 9" (1.75 m)	170 lb (77 kg)	1996-11-06	Edmonton, Alberta	Bonnyville Pontiacs (AJHL)	—
22	(Canada)	Regan Seiferling	Junior	D	6' 2" (1.88 m)	192 lb (87 kg)	1997-03-09	Moose Jaw, Saskatchewan	Yorkton Terriers (SJHL)	—
23	(United States)	Darren Brady (C)	Senior	D	6' 0" (1.83 m)	199 lb (90 kg)	1996-04-05	Lake Orion, Michigan	New Jersey Titans (NAHL)	—
24	(Canada)	Chris McKay (A)	Senior	D	6' 4" (1.93 m)	214 lb (97 kg)	1996-04-17	Edmonton, Alberta	Sherwood Park Crusaders (AJHL)	—
25	(Canada)	Jordan Peacock	Senior	F	6' 6" (1.98 m)	236 lb (107 kg)	1995-03-30	Burlington, Ontario	Burlington Cougars (OJHL)	—
26	(Canada)	Thomas Maia	Freshman	F	5' 9" (1.75 m)	157 lb (71 kg)	2000-07-26	Brampton, Ontario	Oakville Blades (OJHL)	—
27	(Canada)	Andrew Petrucci	Sophomore	F	6' 1" (1.85 m)	207 lb (94 kg)	1997-05-21	Toronto, Ontario	Toronto Patriots (OJHL)	—
28	(Canada)	Merritt Oszytko	Sophomore	F	6' 2" (1.88 m)	171 lb (78 kg)	1998-02-21	Edmonton, Alberta	Fort McMurray Oil Barons (AJHL)	—
30	(Canada)	Logan Drackett	Junior	G	6' 0" (1.83 m)	186 lb (84 kg)	1998-10-01	Calgary, Alberta	Calgary Canucks (NAHL)	—
40	(Canada)	Kolby Matthews	Freshman	G	6' 0" (1.83 m)	160 lb (73 kg)	1999-03-04	Coquitlam, British Columbia	Coquitlam Express (BCHL)	—

== Standings ==
2019–20 Atlantic Hockey Standings
	Conference record								Overall record					
	GP	W	L	T	3/SW	PTS	GF	GA	GP	W	L	T	GF	GA
#20 American International	28	21	6	1	0	64	96	46	34	21	12	1	103	68
Sacred Heart	28	18	8	2	0	56	104	63	34	21	10	3	127	82
RIT	28	15	9	4	1	50	86	73	36	19	13	4	108	98
Army	28	14	11	3	3	48	70	64	33	17	13	3	82	76
Niagara	28	12	12	4	2	42	64	65	34	12	18	4	72	87
Air Force	28	10	12	6	5	41	60	67	34	10	18	6	70	95
Robert Morris	28	11	12	5	3	41	65	65	34	11	18	5	75	90
Bentley	28	13	13	2	0	41	75	80	34	15	16	3	83	94
Canisius	28	9	13	6	3	36	71	83	34	10	18	6	80	109
Holy Cross	28	9	16	3	2	32	67	83	34	10	19	5	80	99
Mercyhurst	28	3	23	2	0	11	49	118	34	5	27	2	64	141
Championship: March 20, 2020 † indicates conference regular season champion; * indicates conference tournament champion Rankings: USCHO.com Top 20 Poll; updated March 1, 2020

== Schedule and results ==
Date	Time	Opponent^{#}	Rank^{#}	Site	TV	Decision	Result	Attendance	Record
Regular season
October 5	7:30 PM	at Colgate*		Class of 1965 Arena • Hamilton, New York		Drackett	W 3–1	2,278	1–0–0
IceBreaker Invitational
October 11	9:10 PM	vs. #17 Bowling Green*		Huntington Center • Toledo, Ohio (IceBreaker Semifinal)		Drackett	W 3–2 ^{OT}	-	2–0–0
October 12	5:00 PM	vs. #12 Ohio State*		Huntington Center • Toledo, Ohio (IceBreaker Championship)		Drackett	L 1–3	-	2–1–0
October 19	7:05 PM	vs. Merrimack*		Blue Cross Arena • Rochester, New York		Drackett	W 4–0	9,805	3–1–0
October 24	9:05 PM	at Air Force		Cadet Ice Arena • Colorado Springs, Colorado		Drackett	W 2–1	1,722	4–1–0 (1–0–0–0)
October 25	9:05 PM	at Air Force		Cadet Ice Arena • Colorado Springs, Colorado		Drackett	W 1–0	1,736	5–1–0 (2–0–0–0)
November 1	7:05 PM	vs. Holy Cross		Gene Polisseni Center • Henrietta, New York		Drackett	W 7–4	2,937	6–1–0 (3–0–0–0)
November 2	5:05 PM	vs. Holy Cross		Gene Polisseni Center • Henrietta, New York		Drackett	T 3–3 ^{SOL}	2,937	6–1–1 (3–0–1–0)
November 8	7:05 PM	vs. Niagara		Gene Polisseni Center • Henrietta, New York		Drackett	T 2–2 ^{3x3 OTL}	2,303	6–1–2 (3–0–2–0)
November 9	7:05 PM	at Niagara		Dwyer Arena • Lewiston, New York		Drackett	W 4–1	819	7–1–2 (4–0–2–0)
November 15	7:05 PM	vs. Sacred Heart		Gene Polisseni Center • Henrietta, New York		Andriano	L 5–9	2,193	7–2–2 (4–1–2–0)
November 16	5:05 PM	at Sacred Heart		Gene Polisseni Center • Henrietta, New York		Drackett	L 1–3	2,114	7–3–2 (4–2–2–0)
November 22	7:05 PM	at Army		Tate Rink • West Point, New York		Drackett	L 1–2	1,458	7–4–2 (4–3–2–0)
November 23	7:05 PM	at Army		Tate Rink • West Point, New York		Drackett	W 4–2	2,030	8–4–2 (5–3–2–0)
November 29	7:05 PM	at American International		MassMutual Center • Springfield, Massachusetts		Drackett	L 2–4	692	8–5–2 (5–4–2–0)
November 30	1:05 PM	at American International		MassMutual Center • Springfield, Massachusetts		Drackett	L 1–5	517	8–6–2 (5–5–2–0)
December 6	7:05 PM	at Mercyhurst		Mercyhurst Ice Center • Erie, Pennsylvania		Drackett	W 7–3	2,071	9–6–2 (6–5–2–0)
December 7	7:05 PM	at Mercyhurst		Mercyhurst Ice Center • Erie, Pennsylvania		Drackett	W 3–2	2,227	10–6–2 (7–5–2–0)
December 29	3:05 PM	vs. Guelph*		Gene Polisseni Center • Henrietta, New York (Exhibition)		Mathews	T 2–2 ^{3x3 OTL}	1,324	
January 3	7:05 PM	vs. Canisius		Gene Polisseni Center • Henrietta, New York		Drackett	T 1–1 ^{SOW}	1,620	10–6–3 (7–5–3–1)
January 4	7:35 AM	at Canisius		LECOM Harborcenter • Buffalo, New York		Drackett	L 3–5	569	10–7–3 (7–6–3–1)
January 10	7:05 PM	vs. #13 Massachusetts–Lowell*		Gene Polisseni Center • Henrietta, New York		Drackett	L 4–6	1,908	10–8–3 (7–6–3–1)
January 11	5:05 PM	vs. #13 Massachusetts–Lowell*		Gene Polisseni Center • Henrietta, New York		Matthews	W 3–2	2,604	11–8–3 (7–6–3–1)
January 17	9:05 PM	at #14 Arizona State*		Oceanside Ice Arena • Tempe, Arizona		Drackett	L 1–6	867	11–9–3 (7–6–3–1)
January 18	9:05 PM	at #14 Arizona State*		Oceanside Ice Arena • Tempe, Arizona		Drackett	L 3–5	817	11–10–3 (7–6–3–1)
January 24	7:35 PM	at Canisius		LECOM Harborcenter • Buffalo, New York		Drackett	W 7–4	1,207	12–10–3 (8–6–3–1)
January 25	7:05 PM	vs. Canisius		Gene Polisseni Center • Henrietta, New York		Drackett	W 5–4	3,463	13–10–3 (9–6–3–1)
January 31	7:05 PM	at Holy Cross		Hart Center • Worcester, Massachusetts		Drackett	L 3–4	641	13–11–3 (9–7–3–1)
February 1	7:05 PM	at Holy Cross		Hart Center • Worcester, Massachusetts		Drackett	W 4–2	633	14–11–3 (10–7–3–1)
February 7	7:05 PM	at Robert Morris		Colonials Arena • Neville Township, Pennsylvania		Drackett	W 4–1	529	15–11–3 (11–7–3–1)
February 8	7:05 PM	at Robert Morris		Colonials Arena • Neville Township, Pennsylvania		Drackett	T 3–3 ^{3x3 OTL}	1,041	15–11–4 (11–7–4–1)
February 14	7:05 PM	vs. Bentley		Gene Polisseni Center • Henrietta, New York		Drackett	W 4–1	2,294	16–11–4 (12–7–4–1)
February 15	5:05 PM	vs. Bentley		Gene Polisseni Center • Henrietta, New York		Drackett	W 5–1	3,357	17–11–4 (13–7–4–1)
February 21	7:05 PM	at Niagara		Dwyer Arena • Lewiston, New York		Drackett	L 1–4	912	17–12–4 (13–8–4–1)
February 22	7:05 PM	vs. Niagara		Gene Polisseni Center • Henrietta, New York		Drackett	W 3–2 ^{OT}	3,015	18–12–4 (14–8–4–1)
February 28	7:05 PM	vs. Air Force		Gene Polisseni Center • Henrietta, New York		Andriano	L 0–3	2,070	18–13–4 (14–9–4–1)
February 29	7:05 PM	vs. Air Force		Gene Polisseni Center • Henrietta, New York		Andriano	W 5–3	3,348	19–13–4 (15–9–4–1)
Atlantic Hockey Tournament
Tournament Cancelled
*Non-conference game. ^{#}Rankings from USCHO.com Poll. All times are in Eastern Time.

== Scoring Statistics ==
Name	Position	Games	Goals	Assists	Points	PIM
Shawn Cameron	RW	36	18	11	29	16
Adam Brubacher	D	36	4	24	28	29
Jake Hamacher	LW	36	9	17	26	0
Elijah Gonsalves	RW/C	35	9	15	24	37
Caleb Moretz	RW/C	36	9	15	24	24
Alden Dupuis	F	30	8	11	19	14
Nick Bruce	F	34	3	14	17	22
Dan Willett	D	35	0	16	16	29
Andrew Rinaldi	LW	36	10	5	15	42
Darren Brady	D	36	3	9	12	16
Kobe Walker	F	31	7	4	11	8
Chris McKay	D	35	3	8	11	49
Jake Joffe	RW	24	7	2	9	6
Ryan Nicholson	D	36	1	8	9	16
Bryson Traptow	F	17	0	9	9	19
Ryan Kruper	F	26	3	2	5	12
Jordan Peacock	F	21	1	4	5	29
Andrew Petrucci	C	22	1	4	5	8
Regan Seiferling	D	30	1	4	5	8
Colton Trumbla	LW	12	2	2	4	4
Logan Drackett	G	33	0	3	3	2
Brody Valette	D	23	1	1	2	31
Merritt Oszytko	F	4	0	2	2	0
Kolby Mathews	G	2	0	0	0	0
Ian Andriano	G	5	0	0	0	0
Zach Salloum	D	6	0	0	0	6
Spencer Berry	D	15	0	0	0	4
Bench	-	-	-	-	-	10
Total			113	200	313	463

== Goaltending statistics ==
Name	Games	Minutes	Wins	Losses	Ties	Goals against	Saves	Shut outs	SV %	GAA
Kolby Mathews	2	70	1	0	0	2	28	0	.933	1.69
Logan Drackett	33	1922	17	11	4	88	856	2	.907	2.75
Ian Andriano	5	175	1	2	0	9	68	0	.883	3.07
Empty Net	-	13	-	-	-	5	-	-	-	-
Total	36	2182	19	13	4	104	952	2	.902	2.86

== Rankings ==
Poll	Week																							
Poll	Pre	1	2	3	4	5	6	7	8	9	10	11	12	13	14	15	16	17	18	19	20	21	22	23 (Final)
USCHO.com	NR	NR	NR	NR	NR	NR	NR	NR	NR	NR	NR	NR	NR	NR	NR	NR	NR	NR	NR	NR	NR	NR	NR	NR
USA Today	NR	NR	NR	NR	NR	NR	NR	NR	NR	NR	NR	NR	NR	NR	NR	NR	NR	NR	NR	NR	NR	NR	NR	NR
