= 2019–20 Holy Cross Crusaders men's ice hockey season =

- Conference: 10th Atlantic Hockey
- Home ice: Hart Center

Rankings
- USCHO.com: NR
- USA Today/ US Hockey Magazine: NR

Record
- Overall: 11–21–5
- Conference: 9–16–3–2
- Home: 6–11–1
- Road: 5–10–4
- Neutral: 0–0–0

Coaches and captains
- Head coach: David Berard
- Assistant coaches: Peter Roundy; Max Mobley; Jon Lounsbury
- Captain: Jack Surowiec
- Alternate captain(s): Kevin Darrar; Logan Ferguson; Anthony Vincent

The 2019–20 Holy Cross Crusaders men's ice hockey season was the 54th season of play for the program, the 22nd at the Division I level, and the 17th season in the Atlantic Hockey conference. The Crusaders represented the College of the Holy Cross and were coached by David Berard, in his 6th season.

== Departures ==
Player	Position	Nationality	Cause
Matt Barry	Forward	United States	Transferred to Miami
Mitch Collett	Forward	Canada	Graduation (Retired)
Johnny Coughlin	Defenseman	United States	Graduation (Signed with Maine Mariners)
Peter Crinella	Forward	United States	Graduation (Signed with Wichita Thunder)
Mike Laffin	Forward	United States	Graduation (Retired)
Jay Mackie	Forward	Canada	Graduation (Retired)
Tommy Nixon	Goaltender	Canada	Graduation (Signed with Worcester Railers)
Spencer Trapp	Defenseman	Canada	Graduation (Signed with Worcester Railers)

== Recruiting ==
Player	Position	Nationality	Age	Notes
Grayson Constable	Forward	Canada	21	Lethbridge, AB
Nick Hale	Defenseman	United States	20	Raleigh, NC
Christian Hayes	Forward	United States	20	Milton, MA
Mike Higgins	Defenseman	United States	19	Needham, MA
Alex Peterson	Forward	United States	21	Lansdale, PA
Matt Radomsky	Goaltender	Canada	20	Winnipeg, MB
Bobby Young	Forward	Canada	20	Kitchener, ON

== Roster ==
As of July 12, 2019.

No.	Nat.	Player	Class	Pos	Height	Weight	DoB	Hometown	Previous team	NHL rights
2	(United States)	Patrick O'Leary	Senior	D	6' 1" (1.85 m)	195 lb (88 kg)	1997-01-31	Norfolk, Massachusetts	Boston Junior Bruins (USPHL)	—
3	(United States)	Frank Boie	Junior	D	6' 1" (1.85 m)	193 lb (88 kg)	1998-05-15	Needham, Massachusetts	Langley Rivermen (BCHL)	—
4	(United States)	Dalton Skelly	Senior	D	5' 10" (1.78 m)	179 lb (81 kg)	1995-09-22	Keller, Texas	Lone Star Brahmas (NAHL)	—
5	(United States)	Mike Higgins	Freshman	D	5' 10" (1.78 m)	205 lb (93 kg)	2000-04-06	Needham, Massachusetts	Northeast Generals (NAHL)	—
6	(United States)	Bryce Dolan	Sophomore	D	6' 1" (1.85 m)	190 lb (86 kg)	1999-02-13	Barrington, Rhode Island	Kimball Union Academy (USHS–NH)	—
7	(United States)	Nick Hale	Freshman	D	5' 9" (1.75 m)	165 lb (75 kg)	1999-05-07	Raleigh, North Carolina	Brooks Bandits (AJHL)	—
8	(United States)	Will Brophy	Senior	D	6' 4" (1.93 m)	212 lb (96 kg)	1996-08-09	Fairfield, Connecticut	Islanders Hockey Club (USPHL)	—
10	(United States)	Kevin Darrar (A)	Senior	F	5' 11" (1.8 m)	188 lb (85 kg)	1996-06-10	Monroe Township, New Jersey	Lloydminster Bobcats (AJHL)	—
12	(United States)	Conner Jean	Sophomore	F	5' 10" (1.78 m)	183 lb (83 kg)	1997-02-15	Oakland, Michigan	Brooks Bandits (AJHL)	—
13	(Canada)	Grayson Constable	Freshman	F	6' 2" (1.88 m)	201 lb (91 kg)	1998-05-05	Lethbridge, Alberta	Bonnyville Pontiacs (AJHL)	—
14	(United States)	Christian Hayes	Freshman	F	5' 7" (1.7 m)	167 lb (76 kg)	1999-02-01	Milton, Massachusetts	Thayer Academy (USHS–MA)	—
15	(United States)	Charlie Barrow	Senior	D	5' 11" (1.8 m)	163 lb (74 kg)	1996-11-04	Belmont, Massachusetts	Coquitlam Express (BCHL)	—
17	(United States)	Ryan Leibold	Sophomore	F	5' 10" (1.78 m)	195 lb (88 kg)	1998-11-03	Ashburn, Virginia	Sioux City Musketeers (USHL)	—
18	(Canada)	Bobby Young	Freshman	F	5' 11" (1.8 m)	185 lb (84 kg)	1998-11-08	Kitchener, Ontario	Bonnyville Pontiacs (AJHL)	—
19	(United States)	Alex Peterson	Freshman	F	5' 10" (1.78 m)	172 lb (78 kg)	1998-03-27	Lansdale, Pennsylvania	Amarillo Bulls (NAHL)	—
20	(Canada)	Logan Ferguson (A)	Junior	F	6' 1" (1.85 m)	179 lb (81 kg)	1997-04-18	Calgary, Alberta	Canmore Eagles (AJHL)	—
21	(Canada)	Neil Robinson	Senior	F	5' 11" (1.8 m)	184 lb (83 kg)	1995-09-06	Pointe-Claire, Quebec	Brockville Braves (CCHL)	—
22	(United States)	Jack Surowiec (C)	Senior	F	6' 2" (1.88 m)	192 lb (87 kg)	1996-07-26	Louisville, Kentucky	Coquitlam Express (BCHL)	—
24	(Canada)	Andrew Dumaresque	Junior	F	6' 1" (1.85 m)	194 lb (88 kg)	1997-02-25	Hammonds Plains, Nova Scotia	Langley Rivermen (BCHL)	—
26	(United States)	Pete Kessel	Junior	F	6' 2" (1.88 m)	192 lb (87 kg)	1996-01-19	Bloomfield Hills, Michigan	Lone Star Brahmas (NAHL)	—
27	(United States)	Matt Slick	Sophomore	D	6' 1" (1.85 m)	214 lb (97 kg)	1999-03-13	Buffalo, New York	Chilliwack Chiefs (BCHL)	—
28	(Canada)	Logan Milliken	Junior	D	5' 11" (1.8 m)	187 lb (85 kg)	1997-06-30	Canmore, Alberta	Wenatchee Wild (BCHL)	—
29	(United States)	Erik Gordon	Sophomore	G	5' 10" (1.78 m)	172 lb (78 kg)	1999-01-05	Duluth, Georgia	Calgary Canucks (AJHL)	—
30	(Canada)	Matt Radomsky	Freshman	G	6' 2" (1.88 m)	185 lb (84 kg)	1999-06-21	Winnipeg, Manitoba	Steinbach Pistons (MJHL)	—
31	(United States)	Beau Collins	Senior	G	6' 1" (1.85 m)	182 lb (83 kg)	1996-08-31	Londonderry, New Hampshire	Portland Jr. Pirates (USPHL)	—
34	(United States)	Anthony Vincent (A)	Sophomore	F	5' 10" (1.78 m)	180 lb (82 kg)	1997-08-12	Wilton, Connecticut	Chilliwack Chiefs (BCHL)	—
37	(United States)	Jake Pappalardo	Junior	F	5' 10" (1.78 m)	185 lb (84 kg)	1997-07-11	Salem, New Hampshire	Maine Black Bears (HEA)	—
40	(Finland)	Erkka Vänskä	Sophomore	F	5' 11" (1.8 m)	168 lb (76 kg)	1998-02-15	Espoo, Finland	Fairbanks Ice Dogs (NAHL)	—

== Standings ==
2019–20 Atlantic Hockey Standings
	Conference record								Overall record					
	GP	W	L	T	3/SW	PTS	GF	GA	GP	W	L	T	GF	GA
#20 American International	28	21	6	1	0	64	96	46	34	21	12	1	103	68
Sacred Heart	28	18	8	2	0	56	104	63	34	21	10	3	127	82
RIT	28	15	9	4	1	50	86	73	36	19	13	4	108	98
Army	28	14	11	3	3	48	70	64	33	17	13	3	82	76
Niagara	28	12	12	4	2	42	64	65	34	12	18	4	72	87
Air Force	28	10	12	6	5	41	60	67	34	10	18	6	70	95
Robert Morris	28	11	12	5	3	41	65	65	34	11	18	5	75	90
Bentley	28	13	13	2	0	41	75	80	34	15	16	3	83	94
Canisius	28	9	13	6	3	36	71	83	34	10	18	6	80	109
Holy Cross	28	9	16	3	2	32	67	83	34	10	19	5	80	99
Mercyhurst	28	3	23	2	0	11	49	118	34	5	27	2	64	141
Championship: March 20, 2020 † indicates conference regular season champion; * indicates conference tournament champion Rankings: USCHO.com Top 20 Poll; updated March 1, 2020

== Schedule and results ==
Date	Time	Opponent^{#}	Rank^{#}	Site	TV	Decision	Result	Attendance	Record
Exhibition
October 5	7:05 PM	vs. Simon Fraser*		Hart Center • Worcester, Massachusetts (Exhibition)		Radomsky	W 9–0 ^{3x3 OTL}	482	
Regular season
October 11	7:15 PM	at #6 Providence*		Schneider Arena • Providence, Rhode Island		Radomsky	W 3–2 ^{OT}	1,900	1–0–0
October 13	4:05 PM	vs. USNTDP*		Hart Center • Worcester, Massachusetts (Exhibition)		Gordon	L 2–4	1,100	
October 17	7:05 PM	vs. Merrimack*		Hart Center • Worcester, Massachusetts	NESN+	Radomsky	L 1–3	1,550	1–1–0
October 19	7:05 PM	at Northeastern*		Matthews Arena • Boston, Massachusetts	NESN+	Gordon	T 2–2 ^{OT}	2,504	1–1–1
October 25	7:05 PM	vs. St. Lawrence*		Hart Center • Worcester, Massachusetts		Radomsky	T 2–2 ^{OT}	1,837	1–1–2
November 1	7:05 PM	at RIT		Gene Polisseni Center • Henrietta, New York		Gordon	L 4–7	2,937	1–2–2 (0–1–0–0)
November 2	5:05 PM	at RIT		Gene Polisseni Center • Henrietta, New York		Radomsky	T 3–3 ^{SOW}	2,178	1–2–3 (0–1–1–1)
November 7	7:05 PM	at Sacred Heart		Webster Bank Arena • Bridgeport, Connecticut		Radomsky	W 2–1	233	2–2–3 (1–1–1–1)
November 8	7:05 PM	vs. Sacred Heart		Hart Center • Worcester, Massachusetts		Radomsky	L 2–4	1,052	2–3–3 (1–2–1–1)
November 15	7:05 PM	vs. Army		Hart Center • Worcester, Massachusetts		Radomsky	L 1–4	600	2–4–3 (1–3–1–1)
November 16	5:05 PM	vs. Army		Hart Center • Worcester, Massachusetts		Radomsky	L 1–3	755	2–5–3 (1–4–1–1)
November 21	7:05 PM	at Sacred Heart		Webster Bank Arena • Bridgeport, Connecticut		Radomsky	W 4–3	303	3–5–3 (2–4–1–1)
November 22	7:05 PM	vs. Sacred Heart		Hart Center • Worcester, Massachusetts		Radomsky	L 1–4	1,052	3–6–3 (2–5–1–1)
November 29	7:05 PM	vs. Bentley		Hart Center • Worcester, Massachusetts		Radomsky	L 2–3	637	3–7–3 (2–6–1–1)
November 30	4:05 PM	vs. Bentley		Hart Center • Worcester, Massachusetts		Gordon	L 4–1	1,260	3–8–3 (2–7–1–1)
December 6	9:05 PM	at Air Force		Cadet Ice Arena • Colorado Springs, Colorado		Radomsky	L 2–7	1,902	3–9–3 (2–8–1–1)
December 7	7:05 PM	at Air Force		Cadet Ice Arena • Colorado Springs, Colorado		Radomsky	T 3–3 ^{SOL}	1,608	3–9–4 (2–8–2–1)
December 28	4:05 PM	at Canisius		LECOM Harborcenter • Buffalo, New York		Radomsky	L 2–5	525	3–10–4 (2–9–2–1)
December 29	4:05 PM	at Canisius		LECOM Harborcenter • Buffalo, New York		Radomsky	L 1–3	472	3–11–4 (2–10–2–1)
January 3	7:05 PM	vs. Mercyhurst		Hart Center • Worcester, Massachusetts		Radomsky	W 4–0	668	4–11–4 (3–10–2–1)
January 4	7:05 PM	vs. Mercyhurst		Hart Center • Worcester, Massachusetts		Radomsky	W 7–2	437	5–11–4 (4–10–2–1)
January 10	7:05 PM	at Niagara		Dwyer Arena • Lewiston, New York		Radomsky	W 6–3	437	6–11–4 (5–10–2–1)
January 11	4:05 PM	at Niagara		Dwyer Arena • Lewiston, New York		Radomsky	T 2–2 ^{SOW}	350	6–11–5 (5–10–3–2)
January 17	7:05 PM	vs. #20 Quinnipiac*		Hart Center • Worcester, Massachusetts		Radomsky	L 3–4	869	6–12–4 (5–10–2–1)
January 24	7:05 PM	vs. Air Force		Hart Center • Worcester, Massachusetts		Radomsky	W 3–1	900	7–12–4 (6–10–2–1)
January 25	7:05 PM	vs. Air Force		Hart Center • Worcester, Massachusetts		Radomsky	W 2–1	844	8–12–4 (7–10–2–1)
January 31	7:05 PM	vs. RIT		Hart Center • Worcester, Massachusetts		Radomsky	W 4–3	641	9–12–4 (8–10–2–1)
February 1	7:05 PM	vs. RIT		Hart Center • Worcester, Massachusetts		Radomsky	L 2–4	633	9–13–4 (8–11–2–1)
February 7	7:05 PM	vs. #11 Arizona State*		Hart Center • Worcester, Massachusetts		Radomsky	L 2–3 ^{OT}	1,905	9–14–4 (8–11–2–1)
February 14	7:05 PM	vs. Robert Morris		Hart Center • Worcester, Massachusetts		Radomsky	W 5–3	504	10–14–4 (9–11–2–1)
February 15	7:05 PM	vs. Robert Morris		Hart Center • Worcester, Massachusetts		Radomsky	L 2–4	553	10–15–4 (9–12–2–1)
February 20	7:05 PM	at American International		MassMutual Center • Springfield, Massachusetts		Radomsky	L 1–4	776	10–16–4 (9–13–2–1)
February 22	7:05 PM	at American International		MassMutual Center • Springfield, Massachusetts		Radomsky	L 0–2	1,108	10–17–4 (9–14–2–1)
February 28	7:05 PM	at Bentley		Bentley Arena • Waltham, Massachusetts		Radomsky	L 2–3	1,554	10–18–4 (9–15–2–1)
February 29	7:05 PM	vs. Bentley		Hart Center • Worcester, Massachusetts		Radomsky	L 2–6	540	10–19–4 (9–16–2–1)
Atlantic Hockey Tournament
March 6	7:05 PM	at Robert Morris*		Colonials Arena • Neville Township, Pennsylvania (First Round Game 1)		Radomsky	W 2–0	487	11–19–4 (9–16–2–1)
March 7	7:05 PM	at Robert Morris*		Colonials Arena • Neville Township, Pennsylvania (First Round Game 2)		Radomsky	L 1–2 ^{OT}	520	11–20–4 (9–16–2–1)
March 8	7:05 PM	at Robert Morris*		Colonials Arena • Neville Township, Pennsylvania (First Round Game 3)		Radomsky	L 1–5	433	11–21–4 (9–16–2–1)
Holy Cross Lost Series 1–2
*Non-conference game. ^{#}Rankings from USCHO.com Poll. All times are in Eastern Time.

== Scoring Statistics ==
Name	Position	Games	Goals	Assists	Points	PIM
Neil Robinson	LW	36	10	13	23	14
Logan Ferguson	RW	37	7	15	22	35
Pete Kessel	F	34	12	6	18	27
Conner Jean	C	36	12	6	18	45
Kevin Darrar	F	34	9	8	17	31
Alex Peterson	F	36	7	9	16	37
Ryan Leibold	F	37	3	12	15	32
Jake Pappalardo	C	30	4	10	14	16
Dalton Skelly	D	36	2	11	13	10
Anthony Vincent	F	21	4	7	11	20
Matt Slick	D	34	3	7	10	22
Will Brophy	D	37	3	6	9	10
Jack Surowiec	C/LW	34	1	8	9	33
Nick Hale	D	35	0	7	7	16
Mike Higgins	D	32	1	5	6	10
Patrick O'Leary	D	26	2	3	5	6
Grayson Constable	F	33	1	3	4	10
Erkka Vänskä	F	17	2	1	3	2
Andrew Dumaresque	C	14	1	2	3	6
Charlie Barrow	D	30	1	2	3	10
Frank Boie	D	19	2	0	2	4
Bobby Young	C	18	1	1	2	8
Logan Milliken	D	8	0	2	2	4
Bryce Dolan	D	20	0	1	1	2
Erik Gordon	G	4	0	0	0	0
Beau Collins	G	5	0	0	0	0
Christian Hayes	F	7	0	0	0	2
Matt Radomsky	G	34	0	0	0	2
Total						

== Goaltending statistics ==
Name	Games	Minutes	Wins	Losses	Ties	Goals against	Saves	Shut outs	SV %	GAA
Matt Radomsky	34	1985	11	18	4	96	892	2	.903	2.90
Beau Collins	5	46	0	0	0	3	46	0	.842	3.88
Erik Gordon	4	212	0	3	1	15	80	0	.842	4.24
Empty Net	-	11	-	-	-	1	-	-	-	-
Total	37	2255	11	21	5	115	988	2	.896	3.06

== Rankings ==
Poll	Week																							
Poll	Pre	1	2	3	4	5	6	7	8	9	10	11	12	13	14	15	16	17	18	19	20	21	22	23 (Final)
USCHO.com	NR	NR	NR	NR	NR	NR	NR	NR	NR	NR	NR	NR	NR	NR	NR	NR	NR	NR	NR	NR	NR	NR	NR	NR
USA Today	NR	NR	NR	NR	NR	NR	NR	NR	NR	NR	NR	NR	NR	NR	NR	NR	NR	NR	NR	NR	NR	NR	NR	NR
