= 2019–20 Robert Morris Colonials men's ice hockey season =

- Conference: T–6th Atlantic Hockey
- Home ice: Colonials Arena

Rankings
- USCHO.com: NR
- USA Today/ US Hockey Magazine: NR

Record
- Overall: 13–19–5
- Conference: 11–12–5–3
- Home: 7–9–4
- Road: 6–10–1
- Neutral: 0–0–0

Coaches and captains
- Head coach: Derek Schooley
- Assistant coaches: Ryan Cruthers; Michael Gershon
- Captain(s): Daniel Mantenuto; Luke Lynch; Nick Prkusic

The 2019–20 Robert Morris Colonials men's ice hockey season is the 16th season of play for the program and the 10th season in the Atlantic Hockey conference. The Colonials represent Robert Morris University and are coached by Derek Schooley, in his 16th season.

On March 12, 2020, Atlantic Hockey announced that the remainder of the conference tournament was cancelled due to the coronavirus pandemic.

== Roster ==
As of June 28, 2019.

No.	Nat.	Player	Class	Pos	Height	Weight	DoB	Hometown	Previous team	NHL rights
2	(United States)	Brendon Michaelian	Sophomore	D	6' 0" (1.83 m)	172 lb (78 kg)	1997-12-07	Wixom, Michigan	Amarillo Bulls (NAHL)	—
3	(United States)	Nolan Schaeffer	Sophomore	D	6' 3" (1.91 m)	220 lb (100 kg)	1997-07-15	Marshall, Minnesota	Fairbanks Ice Dogs (NAHL)	—
4	(Canada)	Aidan Girduckis	Sophomore	D	6' 4" (1.93 m)	190 lb (86 kg)	1998-10-08	Belleville, Ontario	Carleton Place Canadians (CCHL)	—
4	(United States)	Tyler Love	Freshman	D	5' 11" (1.8 m)	175 lb (79 kg)	2000-03-16	Moon Township, Pennsylvania	Corpus Christi IceRays (NAHL)	—
5	(United States)	Sean Giles	Senior	D	6' 1" (1.85 m)	182 lb (83 kg)	1996-05-14	Colorado Springs, Colorado	Lone Star Brahmas (NAHL)	—
6	(Canada)	Darcy Walsh	Freshman	F	5' 11" (1.8 m)	165 lb (75 kg)	1999-02-06	Gloucester, Ontario	Ottawa Jr. Senators (CCHL)	—
7	(United States)	Nick Jenny	Junior	D	5' 10" (1.78 m)	185 lb (84 kg)	1996-06-23	Strongsville, Ohio	Aberdeen Wings (NAHL)	—
8	(United States)	Aidan Spellacy	Sophomore	D	5' 11" (1.8 m)	175 lb (79 kg)	1998-06-13	Lakewood, Ohio	Lone Star Brahmas (NAHL)	—
9	(Canada)	Daniel Mantenuto (C)	Senior	F	5' 9" (1.75 m)	170 lb (77 kg)	1997-10-18	Thornhill, Ontario	Aurora Tigers (OJHL)	—
10	(Canada)	Nick Lalonde	Sophomore	F	5' 9" (1.75 m)	175 lb (79 kg)	1998-01-30	Brooklin, Ontario	Ottawa Jr. Senators (CCHL)	—
11	(United States)	Kip Hoffmann	Sophomore	F	5' 11" (1.8 m)	185 lb (84 kg)	1997-03-05	Huntley, Illinois	Janesville Jets (NAHL)	—
12	(Canada)	Garrett Clegg	Freshman	F	5' 11" (1.8 m)	185 lb (84 kg)	2000-01-13	St. Albert, Alberta	Sherwood Park Crusaders (AJHL)	—
14	(Canada)	Grant Hebert	Sophomore	F	6' 3" (1.91 m)	190 lb (86 kg)	1997-05-22	St. Andrews West, Ontario	Fargo Force (USHL)	—
15	(United States)	Roman Kraemer	Freshman	F	5' 10" (1.78 m)	195 lb (88 kg)	1998-01-09	Pittsburgh, Pennsylvania	Johnstown Tomahawks (NAHL)	—
16	(Canada)	Nick Prkusic (C)	Junior	F	6' 3" (1.91 m)	205 lb (93 kg)	1996-11-10	St. Albert, Alberta	Brooks Bandits (AJHL)	—
17	(United States)	Aiden Beck	Sophomore	F	6' 2" (1.88 m)	185 lb (84 kg)	1998-08-28	Coraopolis, Pennsylvania	Springfield Jr. Blues (NAHL)	—
18	(United States)	Michael Coyne	Senior	F	6' 0" (1.83 m)	190 lb (86 kg)	1995-02-21	Buffalo, New York	Wenatchee Wild (BCHL)	—
19	(United States)	Alex Robert	Senior	D	6' 0" (1.83 m)	190 lb (86 kg)	1995-01-08	Novi, Michigan	Madison Capitols (USHL)	—
20	(Canada)	Cameron Hebert	Freshman	F	6' 1" (1.85 m)	175 lb (79 kg)	1999-03-17	St. Andrews West, Ontario	Johnstown Tomahawks (NAHL)	—
21	(France)	Justin Addamo	Sophomore	F	6' 6" (1.98 m)	227 lb (103 kg)	1998-05-27	Clermont-Ferrand, France	Lone Star Brahmas (NAHL)	—
23	(Canada)	Geoff Lawson	Sophomore	D	6' 0" (1.83 m)	200 lb (91 kg)	1997-05-15	Metcalfe, Ontario	Wellington Dukes (OJHL)	—
25	(Canada)	Bradley Stonnell	Freshman	D	5' 11" (1.8 m)	170 lb (77 kg)	1998-07-22	Surrey, British Columbia	Drumheller Dragons (AJHL)	—
26	(Finland)	Santeri Hartikainen	Freshman	F	6' 2" (1.88 m)	190 lb (86 kg)	1999-01-05	Helsinki, Finland	Corpus Christi IceRays (NAHL)	—
27	(United States)	Jacob Coleman	Senior	F	5' 7" (1.7 m)	162 lb (73 kg)	1997-04-29	Moon Township, Pennsylvania	Muskegon Lumberjacks (USHL)	—
28	(United States)	Luke Lynch (C)	Senior	F	5' 11" (1.8 m)	209 lb (95 kg)	1996-06-20	Pittsburgh, Pennsylvania	Johnstown Tomahawks (NAHL)	—
30	(Canada)	Reid Cooper	Sophomore	G	6' 2" (1.88 m)	185 lb (84 kg)	1998-07-01	Corman Park, Saskatchewan	Salmon Arm Silverbacks (BCHL)	—
31	(United States)	Justin Kapelmaster	Senior	G	6' 1" (1.85 m)	205 lb (93 kg)	1995-10-26	Coral Springs, Florida	Ferris State (WCHA)	—
35	(United States)	Dyllan Lubbesmeyer	Junior	G	6' 0" (1.83 m)	185 lb (84 kg)	1996-12-06	Burnsville, Minnesota	Shreveport Mudbugs (NAHL)	—
44	(United States)	Quinn Warmuth	Freshman	D	6' 4" (1.93 m)	205 lb (93 kg)	1999-09-22	Olmsted Falls, Ohio	Johnstown Tomahawks (NAHL)	—

== Standings ==
2019–20 Atlantic Hockey Standings
	Conference record								Overall record					
	GP	W	L	T	3/SW	PTS	GF	GA	GP	W	L	T	GF	GA
#20 American International	28	21	6	1	0	64	96	46	34	21	12	1	103	68
Sacred Heart	28	18	8	2	0	56	104	63	34	21	10	3	127	82
RIT	28	15	9	4	1	50	86	73	36	19	13	4	108	98
Army	28	14	11	3	3	48	70	64	33	17	13	3	82	76
Niagara	28	12	12	4	2	42	64	65	34	12	18	4	72	87
Air Force	28	10	12	6	5	41	60	67	34	10	18	6	70	95
Robert Morris	28	11	12	5	3	41	65	65	34	11	18	5	75	90
Bentley	28	13	13	2	0	41	75	80	34	15	16	3	83	94
Canisius	28	9	13	6	3	36	71	83	34	10	18	6	80	109
Holy Cross	28	9	16	3	2	32	67	83	34	10	19	5	80	99
Mercyhurst	28	3	23	2	0	11	49	118	34	5	27	2	64	141
Championship: March 20, 2020 † indicates conference regular season champion; * indicates conference tournament champion Rankings: USCHO.com Top 20 Poll; updated March 1, 2020

== Schedule and results ==
Date	Time	Opponent^{#}	Rank^{#}	Site	TV	Decision	Result	Attendance	Record
Regular season
October 5	7:05 PM	vs. Michigan Tech*		Colonials Arena • Neville Township, Pennsylvania		Kapelmaster	L 1–2 ^{OT}	649	0–1–0
October 6	3:05 PM	vs. Michigan Tech*		Colonials Arena • Neville Township, Pennsylvania		Cooper	L 0–7	444	0–2–0
October 11	7:05 PM	vs. Bentley		Colonials Arena • Neville Township, Pennsylvania		Kapelmaster	W 3–0	501	1–2–0 (1–0–0–0)
October 12	5:05 PM	vs. Bentley		Colonials Arena • Neville Township, Pennsylvania		Kapelmaster	W 4–1	498	2–2–0 (2–0–0–0)
October 19	7:05 PM	at Army		Tate Rink • West Point, New York		Kapelmaster	L 1–4	1,258	2–3–0 (2–1–0–0)
October 20	4:05 PM	at Army		Tate Rink • West Point, New York		Kapelmaster	W 3–0	1,159	3–3–0 (3–1–0–0)
October 25	7:07 PM	at #12 Penn State*		Pegula Ice Arena • University Park, Pennsylvania		Kapelmaster	L 1–2	5,799	3–4–0 (3–1–0–0)
November 8	7:35 PM	at Canisius		LECOM Harborcenter • Buffalo, New York		Kapelmaster	W 4–2	481	4–4–0 (4–1–0–0)
November 9	7:05 PM	vs. Canisius		Colonials Arena • Neville Township, Pennsylvania		Kapelmaster	W 4–2	512	5–4–0 (5–1–0–0)
November 15	7:05 PM	at Bentley		Bentley Arena • Waltham, Massachusetts		Kapelmaster	W 6–4	1,071	6–4–0 (6–1–0–0)
November 16	5:05 PM	at Bentley		Bentley Arena • Waltham, Massachusetts		Kapelmaster	W 4–2	1,193	7–4–0 (7–1–0–0)
November 22	7:05 PM	vs. Air Force		Colonials Arena • Neville Township, Pennsylvania		Kapelmaster	L 0–2	686	7–5–0 (7–2–0–0)
November 23	7:05 PM	vs. Air Force		Colonials Arena • Neville Township, Pennsylvania		Kapelmaster	T 1–1 ^{3x3 OTL}	824	7–5–1 (7–2–1–0)
November 30	7:05 PM	vs. Mercyhurst		Colonials Arena • Neville Township, Pennsylvania		Kapelmaster	T 2–2 ^{3x3 OTW}	803	7–5–2 (7–2–2–1)
December 7	7:05 PM	at Sacred Heart		Webster Bank Arena • Bridgeport, Connecticut		Kapelmaster	L 0–6	256	7–6–2 (7–3–2–1)
December 8	4:05 PM	at Sacred Heart		Webster Bank Arena • Bridgeport, Connecticut		Kapelmaster	L 2–4	142	7–7–2 (7–4–2–1)
December 14	5:05 PM	vs. Army		Colonials Arena • Neville Township, Pennsylvania		Lubbesmeyer	L 0–4	429	7–8–2 (7–5–2–1)
December 15	1:05 PM	vs. Army		Colonials Arena • Neville Township, Pennsylvania		Lubbesmeyer	T 1–1 ^{SOL}	376	7–8–3 (7–5–3–1)
January 4		vs. Ontario Tech		1st Summit Arena • Johnstown, Pennsylvania (Exhibition)		Lubbesmeyer	L 2–4		
January 11	7:05 PM	vs. Penn State*		PPG Paints Arena • Pittsburgh, Pennsylvania		Kapelmaster	L 2–6	3,312	7–9–3 (7–5–3–1)
January 14 †	7:05 PM	at Mercyhurst		Mercyhurst Ice Center • Erie, Pennsylvania		Kapelmaster	W 4–1	734	8–9–3 (8–5–3–1)
January 17	7:05 PM	at Mercyhurst		Mercyhurst Ice Center • Erie, Pennsylvania		Kapelmaster	L 1–2	876	8–10–3 (8–6–3–1)
January 18	7:05 PM	vs. Mercyhurst		Colonials Arena • Neville Township, Pennsylvania		Kapelmaster	W 5–1	801	9–10–3 (9–6–3–1)
January 24	7:05 PM	vs. American International		Colonials Arena • Neville Township, Pennsylvania		Kapelmaster	L 3–4	777	9–11–3 (9–7–3–1)
January 25	4:05 PM	vs. American International		Colonials Arena • Neville Township, Pennsylvania		Kapelmaster	L 1–4	686	9–12–3 (9–8–3–1)
January 31	9:05 PM	at #12 Arizona State*		Oceanside Ice Arena • Tempe, Arizona		Kapelmaster	L 2–3	880	9–13–3 (9–8–3–1)
February 1	9:05 PM	at #12 Arizona State*		Oceanside Ice Arena • Tempe, Arizona		Kapelmaster	L 4–5	917	9–14–3 (9–8–3–1)
February 7	7:05 PM	vs. RIT		Colonials Arena • Neville Township, Pennsylvania		Kapelmaster	L 1–4	529	9–15–3 (9–9–3–1)
February 8	7:05 PM	vs. RIT		Colonials Arena • Neville Township, Pennsylvania		Kapelmaster	T 3–3 ^{3x3 OTW}	1,041	9–15–4 (9–9–4–2)
February 14	7:05 PM	at Holy Cross		Hart Center • Worcester, Massachusetts		Cooper	L 3–5	504	9–16–4 (9–10–4–2)
February 15	7:05 PM	at Holy Cross		Hart Center • Worcester, Massachusetts		Cooper	W 4–2	553	10–16–4 (10–10–4–2)
February 21	7:35 PM	at Canisius		LECOM Harborcenter • Buffalo, New York		Cooper	T 1–1 ^{SOW}	597	10–16–5 (10–10–5–3)
February 22	7:05 PM	vs. Canisius		Colonials Arena • Neville Township, Pennsylvania		Kapelmaster	W 4–3	1,092	11–16–5 (11–10–5–3)
February 28	7:05 PM	at Niagara		Dwyer Arena • Lewiston, New York		Cooper	L 0–5	975	11–17–5 (11–11–5–3)
February 29	7:15 PM	at Niagara		Dwyer Arena • Lewiston, New York		Kapelmaster	L 2–5	981	11–18–5 (11–12–5–3)
Atlantic Hockey Tournament
March 6	7:05 PM	vs. Holy Cross*		Colonials Arena • Neville Township, Pennsylvania (First Round Game 1)		Kapelmaster	L 0–2	487	11–19–5 (11–12–5–3)
March 7	7:05 PM	vs. Holy Cross*		Colonials Arena • Neville Township, Pennsylvania (First Round Game 2)		Kapelmaster	W 2–1 ^{OT}	520	12–19–5 (11–12–5–3)
March 8	7:05 PM	vs. Holy Cross*		Colonials Arena • Neville Township, Pennsylvania (First Round Game 3)		Kapelmaster	W 5–1	433	13–19–5 (11–12–5–3)
Robert Morris Won Series 2–1
Remainder of Tournament Cancelled
*Non-conference game. ^{#}Rankings from USCHO.com Poll. All times are in Eastern Time.

† Rescheduled from November 29.

== Scoring Statistics ==
Name	Position	Games	Goals	Assists	Points	PIM
Nick Prkusic	F	34	11	17	28	28
Jacob Coleman	F	36	9	12	21	29
Justin Addamo	RW	36	6	13	19	26
Daniel Mantenuto	C	24	5	12	17	6
Luke Lynch	C	37	5	12	17	34
Brendan Michaelian	F	37	6	6	12	18
Grant Hebert	C	17	5	7	12	25
Aidan Spellacy	F	37	5	7	12	22
Nick Jenny	LW	27	7	4	11	10
Alex Robert	D	36	2	9	11	39
Santeri Hartikainen	C/RW	34	5	5	10	4
Nick Lalonde	RW	32	2	7	9	12
Michael Coyne	F	24	4	2	6	35
Roman Kraemer	F	31	3	3	6	16
Kip Hoffmann	F	23	1	5	6	10
Sean Giles	D	37	1	5	6	28
Darcy Walsh	C	32	3	2	5	10
Garrett Clegg	RW	27	2	3	5	16
Nolan Schaeffer	D	36	1	3	4	37
Cameron Hebert	RW	18	1	2	3	4
Bradley Stonnell	D	10	0	2	2	8
Tyler Love	D	18	0	2	2	17
Quinn Warmuth	D	18	0	1	1	2
Justin Kapelmaster	G	30	0	1	1	2
Reid Cooper	G	5	0	0	0	0
Dyllan Lubbesmeyer	G	8	0	0	0	0
Aiden Beck	F	11	0	0	0	0
Geoff Lawson	D	19	0	0	0	4
Bench	-	-	-	-	-	12
Total			84	142	226	452

== Goaltending statistics ==
Name	Games	Minutes	Wins	Losses	Ties	Goals Against	Saves	Shut Outs	SV %	GAA
Dyllan Lubbesmeyer	8	335	0	2	1	14	163	0	.921	2.51
Justin Kapelmaster	30	1669	12	14	3	70	911	2	.929	2.52
Reid Cooper	5	219	1	3	1	13	106	0	.891	3.56
Empty Net	-	30	-	-	-	7	-	-	-	-
Total	37	2253	13	19	5	104	1180	2	.919	2.77

== Rankings ==
Poll	Week																							
Poll	Pre	1	2	3	4	5	6	7	8	9	10	11	12	13	14	15	16	17	18	19	20	21	22	23 (Final)
USCHO.com	NR	NR	NR	NR	NR	NR	NR	NR	NR	NR	NR	NR	NR	NR	NR	NR	NR	NR	NR	NR	NR	NR	NR	NR
USA Today	NR	NR	NR	NR	NR	NR	NR	NR	NR	NR	NR	NR	NR	NR	NR	NR	NR	NR	NR	NR	NR	NR	NR	NR
