= 2019–20 Bentley Falcons men's ice hockey season =

- Conference: T–6th Atlantic Hockey
- Home ice: Bentley Arena

Rankings
- USCHO.com: NR
- USA Today/ US Hockey Magazine: NR

Record
- Overall: 17–16–3
- Conference: 13–13–2–0
- Home: 11–7–2
- Road: 6–9–1
- Neutral: 0–0–0

Coaches and captains
- Head coach: Ryan Soderquist
- Assistant coaches: Jon Coleman; Stephen Needham; Clay Adams
- Captain(s): Brett Orr; Ryner Gorowsky

The 2019–20 Bentley Falcons men's ice hockey season was the 43rd season of play for the program, the 21st at the Division I level, and the 17th season in the Atlantic Hockey conference. The Falcons represented Bentley University and were coached by Ryan Soderquist, in his 18th season.

On March 12, 2020, Atlantic Hockey announced that the remainder of the conference tournament was cancelled due to the coronavirus pandemic.

== Roster ==
As of September 12, 2019.

No.	Nat.	Player	Class	Pos	Height	Weight	DoB	Hometown	Previous team	NHL rights
3	(Canada)	Luke Orysiuk	Sophomore	D	6' 0" (1.83 m)	195 lb (88 kg)	1997-06-19	Edmonton, Alberta	Fairbanks Ice Dogs (NAHL)	—
4	(Canada)	Marcus Walter	Freshman	D	6' 3" (1.91 m)	195 lb (88 kg)	1999-06-14	St. Albert, Alberta	Alberni Valley Bulldogs (BCHL)	—
5	(United States)	Ethan Roswell	Sophomore	D	5' 11" (1.8 m)	185 lb (84 kg)	1998-07-30	Paradise Valley, Arizona	Boston Junior Bruins (NCDC)	—
6	(United States)	Brendan Hamblet	Junior	F	5' 11" (1.8 m)	180 lb (82 kg)	1998-11-05	Hopkinton, Massachusetts	Rivers School (USHS–MA)	—
7	(United States)	Connor Brassard	Senior	D	6' 1" (1.85 m)	190 lb (86 kg)	1995-04-04	Fitchburg, Massachusetts	Jersey Hitmen (USPHL)	—
9	(United States)	Brendan Walkom	Sophomore	F	6' 0" (1.83 m)	190 lb (86 kg)	1998-01-28	Pittsburgh, Pennsylvania	Madison Capitols (USHL)	—
10	(United States)	Dylan Pitera	Sophomore	F	6' 2" (1.88 m)	190 lb (86 kg)	1999-07-04	Culver, Indiana	Culver Academies (Midget AAA)	—
11	(Canada)	Jakov Novak	Sophomore	F	6' 3" (1.91 m)	215 lb (98 kg)	1998-10-22	Windsor, Ontario	Janesville Jets (NAHL)	OTT, 188th overall 2018
12	(United States)	Matt Gosiewski	Freshman	F	6' 4" (1.93 m)	210 lb (95 kg)	1998-05-10	Wilton, Connecticut	Wenatchee Wild (BCHL)	—
13	(United States)	Will Garin	Sophomore	F	5' 11" (1.8 m)	180 lb (82 kg)	1997-10-30	Mound, Minnesota	Brooks Bandits (AJHL)	—
14	(United States)	Matt Lombardozzi	Junior	D	6' 1" (1.85 m)	200 lb (91 kg)	1997-06-27	Leominster, Massachusetts	Carleton Place Canadians (CCHL)	—
15	(Canada)	Luke Santerno	Junior	F	6' 3" (1.91 m)	195 lb (88 kg)	1996-06-24	Smithers, British Columbia	Trail Smoke Eaters (BCHL)	—
16	(United States)	Sam Kauppila	Junior	F	6' 1" (1.85 m)	185 lb (84 kg)	1996-05-12	Gurnee, Illinois	St. Lawrence (ECAC)	—
17	(United States)	Michael Zuffante	Junior	F	5' 10" (1.78 m)	175 lb (79 kg)	1998-03-17	Bloomingdale, Illinois	Minnesota Wilderness (NAHL)	—
18	(Canada)	Brett Orr	Senior	D	5' 10" (1.78 m)	180 lb (82 kg)	1996-04-04	Elkhorn, Manitoba	Portage Terriers (MJHL)	—
19	(United States)	Jake Kauppila	Senior	F	6' 0" (1.83 m)	195 lb (88 kg)	1995-01-19	Gurnee, Illinois	Trail Smoke Eaters (BCHL)	—
20	(United States)	Will Schlagenhauf	Sophomore	F	5' 9" (1.75 m)	175 lb (79 kg)	1998-10-12	Carmel, Indiana	Muskegon Lumberjacks (USHL)	—
21	(Canada)	Jonathan Desbiens	Senior	F	5' 9" (1.75 m)	180 lb (82 kg)	1996-03-02	Montreal, Quebec	West Kelowna Warriors (BCHL)	—
22	(United States)	Ryner Gorowsky (C)	Senior	F	5' 9" (1.75 m)	180 lb (82 kg)	1996-02-02	Lino Lakes, Minnesota	Fairbanks Ice Dogs (NAHL)	—
23	(United States)	Matt Riggleman	Senior	F	6' 1" (1.85 m)	190 lb (86 kg)	1996-11-11	Milford, Michigan	Sioux Falls Stampede (USHL)	—
24	(United States)	Joe Winkelmann	Freshman	F	5' 11" (1.8 m)	180 lb (82 kg)	2000-05-08	St. Louis, Missouri	Odessa Jackalopes (NAHL)	—
25	(United States)	Hunter Toale	Freshman	D	6' 1" (1.85 m)	170 lb (77 kg)	1999-11-21	Coral Springs, Florida	Johnstown Tomahawks (NAHL)	—
26	(Canada)	Lucas Vanroboys	Freshman	F	6' 2" (1.88 m)	175 lb (79 kg)	1999-07-24	Thamesville, Ontario	Prince George Spruce Kings (BCHL)	—
27	(United States)	Carter Dwyer	Freshman	D	6' 3" (1.91 m)	195 lb (88 kg)	1998-02-06	Exton, Pennsylvania	Johnstown Tomahawks (NAHL)	—
28	(Canada)	Charlie Marchand	Junior	D	5' 11" (1.8 m)	190 lb (86 kg)	1997-08-08	Calgary, Alberta	Brooks Bandits (AJHL)	—
30	(Canada)	Aidan Pelino	Senior	G	6' 1" (1.85 m)	195 lb (88 kg)	1995-11-18	Oakville, Ontario	Chilliwack Chiefs (BCHL)	—
33	(United States)	Jason Grande	Freshman	G	6' 3" (1.91 m)	185 lb (84 kg)	1999-02-07	West Chester, Pennsylvania	Amarillo Bulls (NAHL)	—
34	(Canada)	Fraser Kirk	Sophomore	G	6' 2" (1.88 m)	180 lb (82 kg)	1997-10-07	Burlington, Ontario	Newmarket Hurricanes (OJHL)	—

== Standings ==
2019–20 Atlantic Hockey Standings
	Conference record								Overall record					
	GP	W	L	T	3/SW	PTS	GF	GA	GP	W	L	T	GF	GA
#20 American International	28	21	6	1	0	64	96	46	34	21	12	1	103	68
Sacred Heart	28	18	8	2	0	56	104	63	34	21	10	3	127	82
RIT	28	15	9	4	1	50	86	73	36	19	13	4	108	98
Army	28	14	11	3	3	48	70	64	33	17	13	3	82	76
Niagara	28	12	12	4	2	42	64	65	34	12	18	4	72	87
Air Force	28	10	12	6	5	41	60	67	34	10	18	6	70	95
Robert Morris	28	11	12	5	3	41	65	65	34	11	18	5	75	90
Bentley	28	13	13	2	0	41	75	80	34	15	16	3	83	94
Canisius	28	9	13	6	3	36	71	83	34	10	18	6	80	109
Holy Cross	28	9	16	3	2	32	67	83	34	10	19	5	80	99
Mercyhurst	28	3	23	2	0	11	49	118	34	5	27	2	64	141
Championship: March 20, 2020 † indicates conference regular season champion; * indicates conference tournament champion Rankings: USCHO.com Top 20 Poll; updated March 1, 2020

== Schedule and results ==
Date	Time	Opponent^{#}	Rank^{#}	Site	TV	Decision	Result	Attendance	Record
Regular season
October 11	7:05 PM	at Robert Morris		Colonials Arena • Neville Township, Pennsylvania		Pelino	L 0–3	501	0–1–0 (0–1–0–0)
October 12	5:05 PM	at Robert Morris		Colonials Arena • Neville Township, Pennsylvania		Pelino	L 1–4	498	0–2–0 (0–2–0–0)
October 18	7:05 PM	vs. New Hampshire*		Bentley Arena • Waltham, Massachusetts		Pelino	W 3–2 ^{OT}	1,821	1–2–0 (0–2–0–0)
October 25	7:05 PM	vs. Army		Bentley Arena • Waltham, Massachusetts		Pelino	W 5–0	1,368	2–2–0 (1–2–0–0)
October 26	7:05 PM	vs. St. Lawrence*		Bentley Arena • Waltham, Massachusetts		Pelino	L 0–3	1,094	2–3–0 (1–2–0–0)
November 1	7:05 PM	vs. Mercyhurst		Bentley Arena • Waltham, Massachusetts		Pelino	L 3–4 ^{OT}	1,953	2–4–0 (1–3–0–0)
November 2	7:05 PM	vs. Mercyhurst		Bentley Arena • Waltham, Massachusetts		Kirk	W 6–3	2,038	3–4–0 (2–3–0–0)
November 8	9:05 PM	at Air Force		Cadet Ice Arena • Colorado Springs, Colorado		Pelino	L 2–4	1,921	3–5–0 (2–4–0–0)
November 9	9:05 PM	at Air Force		Cadet Ice Arena • Colorado Springs, Colorado		Grande	L 2–3	1,711	3–6–0 (2–5–0–0)
November 15	7:05 PM	vs. Robert Morris		Bentley Arena • Waltham, Massachusetts		Pelino	L 4–6	1,071	3–7–0 (2–6–0–0)
November 16	5:05 PM	vs. Robert Morris		Bentley Arena • Waltham, Massachusetts		Kirk	W 2–4	1,193	3–8–0 (2–7–0–0)
November 26	4:05 PM	vs. Brown*		Bentley Arena • Waltham, Massachusetts		Kirk	L 1–0	1,144	4–8–0 (2–7–0–0)
November 29	7:05 PM	at Holy Cross		Hart Center • Worcester, Massachusetts		Kirk	W 3–2	637	5–8–0 (3–7–0–0)
November 30	4:05 PM	at Holy Cross		Hart Center • Worcester, Massachusetts		Kirk	W 4–1	1,260	6–8–0 (4–7–0–0)
December 6	7:05 PM	at Army		Tate Rink • West Point, New York		Kirk	L 3–4	1,419	6–9–0 (4–8–0–0)
December 7	7:05 PM	at Army		Tate Rink • West Point, New York		Pelino	W 4–2	1,872	7–9–0 (5–8–0–0)
December 12	7:00 PM	at Dartmouth*		Thompson Arena • Hanover, New Hampshire	NESN+	Pelino	T 2–2 ^{OT}	1,175	7–9–1 (5–8–0–0)
December 28	1:05 PM	at #20 Sacred Heart		Webster Bank Arena • Bridgeport, Connecticut		Pelino	L 0–4	312	7–10–1 (5–9–0–0)
December 29	1:05 PM	at #20 Sacred Heart		Webster Bank Arena • Bridgeport, Connecticut		Kirk	W 3–2	311	8–10–1 (6–9–0–0)
January 6	7:00 PM	at #11 Northeastern*		Matthews Arena • Boston, Massachusetts	NESN	Kirk	L 2–4	2,201	8–11–1 (6–9–0–0)
January 10	7:05 PM	vs. Canisius		Bentley Arena • Waltham, Massachusetts		Pelino	T 3–3 ^{SOL}	1,127	8–11–2 (6–9–1–0)
January 11	7:05 PM	vs. Canisius		Bentley Arena • Waltham, Massachusetts		Kirk	T 4–4 ^{3x3 OTL}	959	8–11–3 (6–9–2–0)
January 17	7:05 PM	vs. American International		Bentley Arena • Waltham, Massachusetts		Grande	L 1–4	1,425	8–12–3 (6–10–2–0)
January 18	4:05 PM	vs. American International		Bentley Arena • Waltham, Massachusetts		Pelino	L 1–2	1,332	8–13–3 (6–11–2–0)
January 24	7:05 PM	at Mercyhurst		Mercyhurst Ice Center • Erie, Pennsylvania		Pelino	W 4–3	879	9–13–3 (7–11–2–0)
January 25	4:05 PM	at Mercyhurst		Mercyhurst Ice Center • Erie, Pennsylvania		Pelino	W 7–4	767	10–13–3 (8–11–2–0)
January 31	7:05 PM	vs. Niagara		Bentley Arena • Waltham, Massachusetts		Kirk	W 3–2 ^{OT}	1,166	11–13–3 (9–11–2–0)
February 1	7:05 PM	vs. Niagara		Bentley Arena • Waltham, Massachusetts		Kirk	W 4–2	1,365	12–13–3 (10–11–2–0)
February 7	7:05 PM	vs. Army		Bentley Arena • Waltham, Massachusetts		Kirk	W 4–1	1,239	13–13–3 (11–11–2–0)
February 8	7:05 PM	vs. #11 Arizona State*		Bentley Arena • Waltham, Massachusetts		Pelino	L 0–3	1,866	13–14–3 (11–11–2–0)
February 14	7:05 PM	at RIT		Gene Polisseni Center • Henrietta, New York		Pelino	L 1–4	2,294	13–15–3 (11–12–2–0)
February 15	5:05 PM	at RIT		Gene Polisseni Center • Henrietta, New York		Pelino	L 1–5	3,357	13–16–3 (11–13–2–0)
February 28	7:05 PM	vs. Holy Cross		Bentley Arena • Waltham, Massachusetts		Pelino	W 3–2	1,554	14–16–3 (12–13–2–0)
February 29	7:05 PM	at Holy Cross		Hart Center • Worcester, Massachusetts		Pelino	W 6–2	540	15–16–3 (13–13–2–0)
Atlantic Hockey Tournament
March 6	7:05 PM	vs. Canisius*		Bentley Arena • Waltham, Massachusetts (Atlantic Hockey First Round game 1)		Pelino	W 6–1	373	16–16–3 (13–13–2–0)
March 7	7:05 PM	vs. Canisius*		Bentley Arena • Waltham, Massachusetts (Atlantic Hockey First Round game 2)		Pelino	W 5–3	288	17–16–3 (13–13–2–0)
Bentley Won Series 2–0
Remainder of Tournament Cancelled
*Non-conference game. ^{#}Rankings from USCHO.com Poll. All times are in Eastern Time.

== Scoring Statistics ==
Name	Position	Games	Goals	Assists	Points	PIM
Jakov Novak	LW/C	35	16	14	30	84
Jonathan Desbiens	LW	35	13	17	30	20
Matt Gosiewski	C	35	10	14	24	2
Luke Santerno	F	36	6	17	23	39
Brendan Hamblet	F	36	11	11	22	32
Connor Brassard	D	35	5	15	20	20
Ryner Gorowsky	RW	30	7	11	18	27
Michael Zuffante	F	33	5	9	14	6
Brett Orr	D	35	4	10	14	8
Matt Lombardozzi	D	33	2	11	13	47
Will Garin	RW	29	4	7	11	42
Dylan Pitera	F	31	3	6	9	16
Charlie Marchand	D	30	2	6	8	10
Lucas Vanroboys	F	32	2	6	8	18
Brendan Walkom	F	25	5	2	7	2
Marcus Walter	D	28	1	4	5	14
Luke Orysiuk	D	33	1	4	5	43
Will Schlagenhauf	F	16	1	3	4	0
Jake Kauppila	LW	25	0	4	4	31
Ethan Roswell	D	26	2	1	3	4
Matt Riggleman	F	29	2	1	3	14
Hunter Toale	D	22	0	3	3	20
Joe Winkelmann	C	13	1	1	2	2
Sam Kauppila	F	2	0	0	0	0
Jason Grande	G	6	0	0	0	0
Fraser Kirk	G	15	0	0	0	0
Aidan Pelino	G	22	0	0	0	0
Bench	–	–	–	–	–	14
Total			103	177	280	515

== Goaltending statistics ==
Name	Games	Minutes	Wins	Losses	Ties	Goals against	Saves	Shut outs	SV %	GAA
Fraser Kirk	15	754	8	3	1	28	274	1	.907	2.23
Jason Grande	6	182	0	2	0	8	65	0	.890	2.63
Aidan Pelino	22	1227	9	11	2	59	452	1	.885	2.88
Empty Net	-	13	-	-	-	7	-	-	-	-
Total	36	2178	17	16	3	102	791	2	.886	2.81

== Rankings ==
Poll	Week																							
Poll	Pre	1	2	3	4	5	6	7	8	9	10	11	12	13	14	15	16	17	18	19	20	21	22	23 (Final)
USCHO.com	NR	NR	NR	NR	NR	NR	NR	NR	NR	NR	NR	NR	NR	NR	NR	NR	NR	NR	NR	NR	NR	NR	NR	NR
USA Today	NR	NR	NR	NR	NR	NR	NR	NR	NR	NR	NR	NR	NR	NR	NR	NR	NR	NR	NR	NR	NR	NR	NR	NR
