= 2023–24 Sacred Heart Pioneers men's ice hockey season =

- Conference: 3rd Atlantic Hockey
- Home ice: Martire Family Arena

Rankings
- USCHO: NR
- USA Hockey: NR

Record
- Overall: 14–19–3
- Conference: 14–10–2
- Home: 8–10–1
- Road: 6–8–2
- Neutral: 0–1–0

Coaches and captains
- Head coach: C. J. Marottolo
- Assistant coaches: Scott McDougall; Craig Height
- Captain(s): Hunter Sansbury; Braeden Tuck
- Alternate captain(s): John Jaworski; Kevin Lombardi

The 2023–24 Sacred Heart Pioneers men's ice hockey season was the 31st season of play for the program, the 26th at the Division I level and the 21st in Atlantic Hockey. The Pioneers represented Sacred Heart University, played their home games at the Martire Family Arena and were coached by C. J. Marottolo in his 15th season.

== Season ==
With a sizable amount of roster turnover, including three of its top four goal-scorers, Sacred Heart had many unanswered questions entering the season. The team was expecting to use Chase Clark as its starting goaltender, but the Quinnipiac transfer had a tough time getting to his game. The Pioneers began poorly, losing four of their first five matches but the team appeared to have sorted itself out by the end of October. Over several weeks, the team went 6–1, not allowing more than two goals in any of its games. The offense, too, got off to a slow start but then picked up the pace in the second month of the season. The line of Walsh–Joughin–Lombardi proved to be the most successful with those three finishing in the top four for team scoring.

In spite of their winning record, Sacred Heart was unable to find any success in their non-conference schedule. Though they had a weak slate of opponents, the Pioneers could not get a single win in eight games, only managing one tie to Princeton. That mark made it impossible for SHU to make the NCAA tournament without a conference title. However, the team was still able to perform well in Atlantic Hockey. Though they had a poor second half, winning just 5 of 17 games after January 1, Sacred Heart managed to finish third in the conference. The struggles began with shaky play from Clark, who was replaced as the starter by Justin Robbins. While Robbins' numbers were only marginally better than Clark's, the graduate netminder played more consistently in the latter half of the year. The offense slowed down as the season went on and the Pioneers could only manage three goals in three of the final thirteen games to end the regular season.

Though they had backed into a quarterfinal bye, Sacred Heart was hoping to use home ice to their advantage and make a run in the conference tournament. However, despite getting a week-long break to resolve their troubles, SHU saw both of its main problems recur against Niagara. The team got a two-goal lead in the opening match but could only watch as the Purple Eagles swiftly erased the advantage. Niagara scored four goals in under nine minutes of game time, including three in a 43-second span, to take hold of the match. SHU opened the scoring in the second game as well but was not able to get a second marker in the final 59 minutes despite outshooting NU nearly two to one. Robbins was in net for both games and allowed 9 goals on 53 shots (both matches had empty-net goals), ending the Pioneers' season on a low note.

== Departures ==
Player	Position	Nationality	Cause
Logan Britt	Defenseman	United States	Graduate transfer to North Dakota
Tim Clifton	Forward	United States	Graduation (retired)
Patrick Dawson	Defenseman	United States	Graduate transfer to Northeastern
Todd Goehring	Forward	United States	Graduation (signed with Atlanta Gladiators)
Cody Hoban	Forward	United States	Left program (retired)
Julian Kislin	Defenseman	Canada	Graduation (signed with South Carolina Stingrays)
Luke Lush	Goaltender	Canada	Graduate transfer to RIT
Austin Magera	Forward	United States	Graduation (signed with South Carolina Stingrays)
Brandon Milberg	Goaltender	Canada	Left program (retired)
Neil Shea	Forward	United States	Graduation (signed with Chicago Wolves)
Ryan Steele	Forward	Canada	Graduation (signed with South Carolina Stingrays)
Jeppe Urup Mogensen	Defenseman	Denmark	Graduate transfer to Northern Michigan

== Recruiting ==
Player	Position	Nationality	Age	Notes
Mikey Adamson	Defenseman	United States	22	Quincy, MA; transfer from Massachusetts
Jake Bongo	Forward	United States	20	Ridgefield, CT
Mark Cheremeta	Forward	United States	21	Minsk, BLR; transfer from Ohio State
Chase Clark	Goaltender	United States	21	Williamsville, NY; transfer from Quinnipiac; selected 183rd overall in 2021
Blake Dangos	Defenseman	United States	21	St. Louis, MO; transfer from Arizona State
Cullen DeYoung	Goaltender	Canada	21	Canton, MI
Brendan Dumas	Forward	United States	21	North Attleborough, MA
Cole Galata	Forward	Canada	21	Barrie, ON
Rylee Hlusiak	Forward	Canada	21	Barrie, ON
Liam Izyk	Forward	Canada	24	Blackie, AB; transfer from Boston College
Tyler Spott	Defenseman	Canada	23	Toronto, ON; graduate transfer from Northeastern
Garrett Sundquist	Defenseman	United States	22	South Glastonbury, CT; transfer from Providence
T. J. Walsh	Forward	United States	23	Shrewsbury, MA; graduate transfer from Rensselaer

== Roster ==
As of September 15, 2023

No.	Nat.	Player	Class	Pos	Height	Weight	DoB	Hometown	Previous team	NHL rights
1	(United States)	Jack O'Dea	Junior	G	5' 9" (1.75 m)	148 lb (67 kg)	2000-09-07	Brighton, Massachusetts	Bridgton Academy (USHS–ME)	—
3	(United States)	Grant Anderson	Senior	D	6' 2" (1.88 m)	180 lb (82 kg)	1999-09-15	Plymouth, Minnesota	Omaha Lancers (USHL)	—
4	(United States)	Blake Dangos	Sophomore	D	5' 10" (1.78 m)	174 lb (79 kg)	2002-04-08	St. Louis, Missouri	Arizona State (NCAA)	—
5	(United States)	Andrius Kulbis-Marino	Senior	D	6' 0" (1.83 m)	184 lb (83 kg)	2000-02-16	Methuen, Massachusetts	Maine Nordiques (NAHL)	—
6	(United States)	Mikey Adamson	Sophomore	D	5' 9" (1.75 m)	170 lb (77 kg)	2001-08-16	Quincy, Massachusetts	Massachusetts (HEA)	—
7	(United States)	Garrett Sundquist	Junior	D	6' 3" (1.91 m)	205 lb (93 kg)	2001-07-17	South Glastonbury, Connecticut	Providence (HEA)	—
8	(United States)	Hunter Sansbury (C)	Junior	D	5' 11" (1.8 m)	180 lb (82 kg)	2000-10-08	Lomita, California	Salmon Arm Silverbacks (BCHL)	—
9	(United States)	Daniel Ebrahim	Junior	F	5' 11" (1.8 m)	180 lb (82 kg)	2000-07-12	Brooklin, Ontario	Jersey Hitmen (NCDC)	—
10	(Japan)	Chikara Hanzawa	Sophomore	F	5' 6" (1.68 m)	160 lb (73 kg)	2001-07-12	Tokyo, Japan	South Shore Kings (NCDC)	—
11	(Canada)	Tyler Spott	Graduate	D	5' 11" (1.8 m)	175 lb (79 kg)	2000-06-17	Toronto, Ontario	Northeastern (HEA)	—
12	(United States)	Kevin Lombardi (A)	Graduate	F	6' 5" (1.96 m)	230 lb (104 kg)	1998-08-12	Schwenksville, Pennsylvania	Sioux City Musketeers (USHL)	—
13	(United States)	T. J. Walsh	Graduate	F	5' 8" (1.73 m)	175 lb (79 kg)	2000-04-29	Shrewsbury, Massachusetts	Rensselaer (ECAC)	—
14	(Canada)	Brendan Kennette	Sophomore	D	6' 2" (1.88 m)	190 lb (86 kg)	2002-06-09	Windsor, Ontario	Brooks Bandits (AJHL)	—
16	(United States)	Dylan Robbins	Sophomore	F	6' 0" (1.83 m)	175 lb (79 kg)	2001-08-29	Alpine, New Jersey	Chicago Steel (USHL)	—
17	(United States)	Aidan Connolly	Sophomore	F	5' 11" (1.8 m)	185 lb (84 kg)	2001-10-05	Marshfield, Massachusetts	Maine Nordiques (NAHL)	—
18	(United States)	John Jaworski (A)	Senior	F	5' 10" (1.78 m)	165 lb (75 kg)	2000-03-20	Grinnell, Iowa	Chicago Steel (USHL)	—
19	(United States)	Jake Bongo	Freshman	F	5' 10" (1.78 m)	170 lb (77 kg)	2002-02-04	Ridgefield, Connecticut	Surrey Eagles (BCHL)	—
20	(United States)	Blake Humphrey	Sophomore	F	5' 8" (1.73 m)	162 lb (73 kg)	2002-01-18	Syracuse, New York	Sioux Falls Stampede (USHL)	—
21	(United States)	Brendan Dumas	Freshman	F	5' 10" (1.78 m)	185 lb (84 kg)	2002-08-28	North Attleborough, Massachusetts	New Jersey Titans (NAHL)	—
22	(United States)	Conner Hutchison	Junior	D	5' 10" (1.78 m)	170 lb (77 kg)	2000-06-02	Hicksville, New York	Tri-City (USHL)	—
23	(Canada)	Braeden Tuck (C)	Graduate	F	6' 1" (1.85 m)	170 lb (77 kg)	1998-04-15	Calgary, Alberta	Trail (BCHL)	—
24	(United States)	Mark Cheremeta	Graduate	F	5' 11" (1.8 m)	185 lb (84 kg)	1999-07-12	Parkland, Florida	Ohio State (Big Ten)	—
25	(Canada)	Dante Fantauzzi	Senior	D	6' 2" (1.88 m)	195 lb (88 kg)	2000-05-01	North York, Ontario	Sioux Falls Stampede (USHL)	—
26	(Canada)	Liam Izyk	Graduate	F	6' 1" (1.85 m)	187 lb (85 kg)	1998-12-27	Blackie, Alberta	Boston College (HEA)	—
27	(Canada)	Cole Galata	Freshman	F	5' 10" (1.78 m)	175 lb (79 kg)	2002-03-18	Barrie, Ontario	Surrey Eagles (BCHL)	—
28	(Canada)	Marcus Joughin	Sophomore	F	5' 11" (1.8 m)	180 lb (82 kg)	2001-07-05	Tecumseh, Ontario	West Kelowna Warriors (BCHL)	—
29	(Canada)	Rylee Hlusiak	Freshman	F	5' 10" (1.78 m)	175 lb (79 kg)	2002-06-03	Barrie, Ontario	West Kelowna Warriors (BCHL)	—
31	(United States)	Justin Robbins	Graduate	G	5' 8" (1.73 m)	160 lb (73 kg)	1999-03-10	Alpine, New Jersey	Arizona State (NCAA)	—
32	(United States)	Chase Clark	Sophomore	G	6' 6" (1.98 m)	208 lb (94 kg)	2002-04-08	Williamsville, New York	Quinnipiac (ECAC)	WSH, 183rd overall 2021
33	(United States)	Cullen DeYoung	Freshman	G	5' 10" (1.78 m)	165 lb (75 kg)	2002-02-03	Canton, Michigan	Northeast Generals (NAHL)	—

== Standings ==
2023–24 Atlantic Hockey Standings
	Conference record										Overall record					
	GP	W	L	T	OW	OL	SW	PTS	GF	GA	GP	W	L	T	GF	GA
#17 RIT †*	26	18	7	1	3	2	0	54	102	64	40	27	11	2	156	96
Holy Cross	26	13	10	3	0	3	1	46	78	62	39	21	14	4	116	93
Sacred Heart	26	14	10	2	2	2	1	45	75	70	36	14	19	3	91	113
Air Force	26	15	10	1	3	0	1	44	88	75	38	18	19	1	115	119
American International	26	12	10	4	1	1	2	42	79	68	40	20	16	4	119	111
Bentley	26	12	12	2	1	2	2	41	69	58	35	16	17	2	95	82
Niagara	26	13	10	3	3	1	1	41	78	79	39	18	18	3	111	122
Canisius	26	10	12	4	2	1	0	33	73	87	37	12	21	4	103	126
Mercyhurst	26	7	15	4	0	1	4	30	77	91	35	9	22	4	98	126
Army	26	8	16	2	0	1	1	28	66	96	35	10	23	2	93	139
Robert Morris	26	7	17	2	0	1	1	25	60	95	39	11	25	3	94	142
Championship: March 23, 2024 † indicates conference regular season champion (DeGregorio Trophy) * indicates conference tournament champion (Riley Trophy); Rankings: USCHO.com Top 20 Poll

== Schedule and results ==
Date	Time	Opponent^{#}	Rank^{#}	Site	TV	Decision	Result	Attendance	Record
Exhibition
October 7	2:00 p.m.	#14 Merrimack*		Martire Family Arena • Fairfield, Connecticut (Exhibition)	FloHockey	Clark	L 2–3 ^{OT}	307	
October 8	4:00 p.m.	Ottawa*		Martire Family Arena • Fairfield, Connecticut (Exhibition)	FloHockey	DeYoung	W 8–2	181	
Regular season
October 13	7:00 p.m.	Colgate*		Martire Family Arena • Fairfield, Connecticut	FloHockey, SNY	Clark	L 2–3	4,165	0–1–0
October 14	7:00 p.m.	Colgate*		Martire Family Arena • Fairfield, Connecticut	FloHockey, SNY	Clark	L 1–6	3,703	0–2–0
October 20	7:05 p.m.	at RIT		Gene Polisseni Center • Henrietta, New York	FloHockey	Clark	L 2–4	2,929	0–3–0 (0–1–0)
October 21	5:05 p.m.	at RIT		Gene Polisseni Center • Henrietta, New York	FloHockey	Clark	W 5–2	2,764	1–3–0 (1–1–0)
October 27	7:00 p.m.	Niagara		Martire Family Arena • Fairfield, Connecticut	FloHockey	Clark	L 3–4 ^{OT}	2,852	1–4–0 (1–2–0)
October 28	7:00 p.m.	Niagara		Martire Family Arena • Fairfield, Connecticut	FloHockey	Clark	W 4–1	2,538	2–4–0 (2–2–0)
October 31	7:00 p.m.	Army		Martire Family Arena • Fairfield, Connecticut	FloHockey, SNY	Clark	W 6–1	2,127	3–4–0 (3–2–0)
November 5	7:00 p.m.	at Long Island*		Northwell Health Ice Center • East Meadow, New York	ESPN+	Clark	L 1–2	349	3–5–0
November 10	7:00 p.m.	Canisius		Martire Family Arena • Fairfield, Connecticut	FloHockey	Clark	W 4–1	2,527	4–5–0 (4–2–0)
November 11	7:00 p.m.	Canisius		Martire Family Arena • Fairfield, Connecticut	FloHockey	Clark	W 3–2	2,493	5–5–0 (5–2–0)
November 24	6:00 p.m.	at Robert Morris		Clearview Arena • Neville Township, Pennsylvania	FloHockey	Clark	W 4–2	623	6–5–0 (6–2–0)
November 25	1:00 p.m.	at Robert Morris		Clearview Arena • Neville Township, Pennsylvania	FloHockey, SNY	Clark	W 3–1	566	7–5–0 (7–2–0)
December 1	1:05 p.m.	at American International		Jennings Fairchild Ice Rink • Avon, Connecticut	FloHockey	Clark	W 5–4	650	8–5–0 (8–2–0)
December 2	1:05 p.m.	at American International		MassMutual Center • Springfield, Massachusetts	FloHockey	Clark	L 2–3	521	8–6–0 (8–3–0)
December 8	7:00 p.m.	Princeton*		Martire Family Arena • Fairfield, Connecticut	FloHockey	Clark	L 0–4	3,671	8–7–0
December 9	7:00 p.m.	at Princeton*		Hobey Baker Memorial Rink • Princeton, New Jersey	ESPN+	DeYoung	T 2–2 ^{OT}	2,153	8–7–1
December 30	7:00 p.m.	#16 New Hampshire*		Martire Family Arena • Fairfield, Connecticut	ESPN+	Robbins	L 2–6	3,368	8–8–1
January 5	7:00 p.m.	Mercyhurst		Martire Family Arena • Fairfield, Connecticut	FloHockey	Clark	L 2–7	2,497	8–9–1 (8–4–0)
January 6	3:00 p.m.	Mercyhurst		Martire Family Arena • Fairfield, Connecticut	FloHockey	Robbins	W 2–1	3,063	9–9–1 (9–4–0)
January 9	7:00 p.m.	Army		Martire Family Arena • Fairfield, Connecticut	FloHockey	Clark	T 3–3 ^{SOW}	2,634	9–9–2 (9–4–1)
January 12	7:05 p.m.	at Bentley		Bentley Arena • Waltham, Massachusetts	FloHockey	Robbins	W 4–3	1,800	10–9–2 (10–4–1)
January 13	7:00 p.m.	Bentley		Martire Family Arena • Fairfield, Connecticut	FloHockey	Clark	L 2–3 ^{OT}	3,242	10–10–2 (10–5–1)
January 16	7:00 p.m.	at Army		Tate Rink • West Point, New York	FloHockey	Robbins	L 1–3	800	10–11–2 (10–6–1)
January 19	7:00 p.m.	Holy Cross		Martire Family Arena • Fairfield, Connecticut	FloHockey	Robbins	W 2–1 ^{OT}	3,817	11–11–2 (11–6–1)
January 20	7:00 p.m.	at Holy Cross		Hart Center • Worcester, Massachusetts	FloHockey	Robbins	L 2–5	824	11–12–2 (11–7–1)
Connecticut Ice
January 26	3:30 p.m.	at Connecticut*		XL Center • Hartford, Connecticut (Connecticut Ice Semifinal)	SNY	Clark	L 2–6	4,633	11–13–2
January 27	3:30 p.m.	vs. Yale*		XL Center • Hartford, Connecticut (Connecticut Ice Consolation Game)	SNY	Robbins	L 2–3	3,927	11–14–2
February 2	7:00 p.m.	American International		Martire Family Arena • Fairfield, Connecticut	FloHockey	Robbins	W 4–3 ^{OT}	3,947	12–14–2 (12–7–1)
February 3	7:00 p.m.	American International		Martire Family Arena • Fairfield, Connecticut	FloHockey	Robbins	W 3–1	3,974	13–14–2 (13–7–1)
February 9	9:05 p.m.	at Air Force		Cadet Ice Arena • Colorado Springs, Colorado	FloHockey	Robbins	W 3–2	2,436	14–14–2 (14–7–1)
February 10	7:05 p.m.	at Air Force		Cadet Ice Arena • Colorado Springs, Colorado	FloHockey, Altitude2	Robbins	L 0–2	2,422	14–15–2 (14–8–1)
February 16	7:00 p.m.	at Holy Cross		Hart Center • Worcester, Massachusetts	FloHockey	Robbins	L 1–5	1,368	14–16–2 (14–9–1)
February 17	7:00 p.m.	Holy Cross		Martire Family Arena • Fairfield, Connecticut	FloHockey	Robbins	L 1–2	3,688	14–17–2 (14–10–1)
February 24	5:30 p.m.	at Bentley		Bentley Arena • Waltham, Massachusetts	FloHockey	Robbins	T 2–2 ^{SOL}	2,043	14–17–3 (14–10–2)
Atlantic Hockey Tournament
March 8	7:00 p.m.	Niagara*		Martire Family Arena • Fairfield, Connecticut (Quarterfinal Game 1)	FloHockey	Robbins	L 3–6	2,354	14–18–3
March 9	7:00 p.m.	Niagara*		Martire Family Arena • Fairfield, Connecticut (Quarterfinal Game 2)	FloHockey	Robbins	L 1–5	2,639	14–19–3
*Non-conference game. ^{#}Rankings from USCHO.com Poll. All times are in Eastern Time. Source:

== Scoring statistics ==
Name	Position	Games	Goals	Assists	Points	PIM
T. J. Walsh	LW	36	13	13	26	6
John Jaworski	F	35	10	16	26	14
Kevin Lombardi	RW	36	11	14	25	19
Marcus Joughin	F	34	8	13	21	16
Mikey Adamson	D	34	4	16	20	12
Braeden Tuck	F	33	6	11	17	6
Hunter Sansbury	D	36	5	10	15	37
Dante Fantauzzi	D	35	2	11	13	32
Daniel Ebrahim	LW	31	9	3	12	19
Mark Cheremeta	LW	17	1	10	11	6
Andrius Kulbis-Marino	D	36	5	5	10	14
Jake Bongo	F	36	3	7	10	4
Liam Izyk	F	34	4	4	8	33
Blake Humphrey	C	23	2	4	6	4
Conner Hutchison	D	14	1	4	5	2
Tyler Spott	D	27	1	4	5	16
Blake Dangos	D	19	1	3	4	16
Grant Anderson	D	34	0	3	3	11
Brendan Dumas	F	12	2	0	2	18
Chikara Hanzawa	RW	28	2	0	2	6
Cole Galata	F	20	0	2	2	4
Rylee Hlusiak	RW	25	0	2	2	10
Dylan Robbins	F	35	0	2	2	16
Garrett Sundquist	D	9	1	0	1	2
Chase Clark	G	19	0	1	1	0
Aidan Connolly	C	2	0	0	0	2
Cullen DeYoung	G	3	0	0	0	0
Justin Robbins	G	17	0	0	0	0
Total			91	158	249	325

== Goaltending statistics ==
Name	Games	Minutes	Wins	Losses	Ties	Goals against	Saves	Shut-outs	SV %	GAA
Cullen DeYoung	3	104:01	0	0	1	3	50	0	.943	1.73
Justin Robbins	17	956:20	6	9	1	47	401	0	.895	2.95
Chase Clark	19	1090:20	8	10	1	55	482	0	.898	3.03
Empty Net	-	32:07	-	-	-	8	-	-	-	-
Total	36	2182:48	14	19	3	113	933	0	.892	3.11

== Rankings ==
Poll	Week																										
Poll	Pre	1	2	3	4	5	6	7	8	9	10	11	12	13	14	15	16	17	18	19	20	21	22	23	24	25	26 (Final)
USCHO.com	NR	NR	NR	NR	NR	NR	NR	NR	NR	NR	NR	–	NR	NR	NR	NR	NR	NR	NR	NR	NR	NR	NR	NR	NR	–	NR
USA Hockey	NR	NR	NR	NR	NR	NR	NR	NR	NR	NR	NR	NR	–	NR	NR	NR	NR	NR	NR	NR	NR	NR	NR	NR	NR	NR	NR

Note: USCHO did not release a poll in weeks 11 and 25.
Note: USA Hockey did not release a poll in week 12.

== Awards and honors ==
Player	Award	Ref
Braeden Tuck	Atlantic Hockey Individual Sportsmanship Award	
Sacred Heart Pioneers	Atlantic Hockey Team Sportsmanship Award	
John Jaworski	Atlantic Hockey Third Team	
