= 2019–20 Sacred Heart Pioneers men's ice hockey season =

Connecticut Ice, Champion
- Conference: 2nd Atlantic Hockey
- Home ice: Webster Bank Arena

Rankings
- USCHO.com: NR
- USA Today/ US Hockey Magazine: NR

Record
- Overall: 21–10–3
- Conference: 18–8–2–0
- Home: 8–7–2
- Road: 13–3–1
- Neutral: 0–0–0

Coaches and captains
- Head coach: C. J. Marottolo
- Assistant coaches: Scott McDougall; Paul Kirtland; Craig Height
- Captain: Marc Johnstone

The 2019–20 Sacred Heart Pioneers men's ice hockey season was the 27th season of play for the program, the 22nd at the Division I level, and the 17th season in the Atlantic Hockey conference. The Pioneers represented Sacred Heart University and were coached by C. J. Marottolo, in his 11th season.

On March 12, 2020, Atlantic Hockey announced that the remainder of the conference tournament was cancelled due to the coronavirus pandemic.

== Current roster ==
As of September 3, 2019.

No.	Nat.	Player	Class	Pos	Height	Weight	DoB	Hometown	Previous team	NHL rights
1	(United States)	Drennen Atherton	Sophomore	G	6' 1" (1.85 m)	185 lb (84 kg)	1997-06-17	Winter Haven, Florida	Northern Cyclones (NCDC)	—
2	(United States)	Colin Bernard	Sophomore	D	5' 10" (1.78 m)	172 lb (78 kg)	1997-10-14	Stamford, Connecticut	Langley Rivermen (BCHL)	—
3	(United States)	Mike Lee	Senior (RS)	D	6' 0" (1.83 m)	190 lb (86 kg)	1996-04-25	Hamden, Connecticut	Vermont (HEA)	—
4	(Denmark)	Jeppe Urup Morgensen	Freshman	D	6' 2" (1.88 m)	176 lb (80 kg)	1999-03-14	Odense, Denmark	Youngstown Phantoms (USHL)	—
6	(United States)	Max Luukko	Junior	D	6' 3" (1.91 m)	190 lb (86 kg)	1995-12-28	Avalon, New Jersey	Philadelphia Jr. Flyers (USPHL)	—
7	(Russia)	Ruslan Rakhmatov	Senior	D	6' 0" (1.83 m)	190 lb (86 kg)	1995-04-25	Moscow, Russia	Chicago Steel (USHL)	—
8	(United States)	Tim Clifton	Freshman	F	5' 10" (1.78 m)	165 lb (75 kg)	1998-02-23	Farmingdale, New Jersey	Shreveport Mudbugs (NAHL)	—
9	(United States)	Jason Cotton	Senior	F	6' 3" (1.91 m)	190 lb (86 kg)	1995-02-07	Parker, Texas	Youngstown Phantoms (USHL)	—
10	(United States)	Alex Bates	Junior	D	5' 11" (1.8 m)	175 lb (79 kg)	1997-06-17	Parker, Colorado	Wenatchee Wild (BCHL)	—
11	(Canada)	Ryan Steele	Sophomore	F	6' 1" (1.85 m)	182 lb (83 kg)	1997-09-13	Stratford, Prince Edward Island	West Kelowna Warriors (BCHL)	—
12	(United States)	Kevin Lombardi	Freshman	F	6' 0" (1.83 m)	234 lb (106 kg)	1998-08-12	Schwenksville, Pennsylvania	Sioux City Musketeers (USHL)	—
13	(United States)	Jordan Kaplan	Junior	F	5' 10" (1.78 m)	170 lb (77 kg)	1997-05-19	Bridgewater, New Jersey	New Jersey Titans (NAHL)	—
14	(United States)	Nick Boyagian	Sophomore	F	6' 2" (1.88 m)	181 lb (82 kg)	1997-07-16	East Greenbush, New York	New Jersey Titans (NAHL)	—
15	(United States)	Evan Wisocky	Junior	F	5' 10" (1.78 m)	195 lb (88 kg)	1998-03-20	Hoboken, New Jersey	Connecticut (HEA)	—
16	(United States)	Marcus Joseph	Junior	D	5' 9" (1.75 m)	180 lb (82 kg)	1997-05-08	Mountain Top, Pennsylvania	Nanaimo Clippers (BCHL)	—
17	(United States)	Daniel Petrick	Freshman	D	5' 9" (1.75 m)	199 lb (90 kg)	1999-04-06	Wilbraham, Massachusetts	Madison Capitols (USHL)	—
18	(United States)	Michael Gilroy	Junior	D	6' 3" (1.91 m)	205 lb (93 kg)	1996-10-10	North Bellmore, New York	P.A.L. Jr. Islanders (USPHL)	—
19	(Canada)	Matt Tugnutt	Junior	F	5' 10" (1.78 m)	180 lb (82 kg)	1996-05-14	Peterborough, Ontario	Kemptville 73's (CCHL)	—
20	(United States)	Vito Bavaro	Senior	F	6' 2" (1.88 m)	195 lb (88 kg)	1997-10-01	Sarasota, Florida	Brooks School (USHS–MA)	—
21	(Canada)	Josh Allan	Junior	D	5' 10" (1.78 m)	200 lb (91 kg)	1997-05-02	Orillia, Ontario	Trenton Golden Hawks (OJHL)	—
22	(United States)	Derek Contessa	Freshman	F	6' 0" (1.83 m)	206 lb (93 kg)	1999-03-03	Freehold, New Jersey	Dubuque Fighting Saints (USHL)	—
23	(Canada)	Braeden Tuck	Freshman	F	6' 0" (1.83 m)	183 lb (83 kg)	1998-04-15	Calgary, Alberta	Trail Smoke Eaters (BCHL)	—
24	(United States)	Austin Magera	Sophomore	F	6' 1" (1.85 m)	185 lb (84 kg)	1998-07-19	Suwanee, Georgia	Lincoln Stars (USHL)	—
25	(United States)	Austin McIlmurray	Senior	F	5' 11" (1.8 m)	185 lb (84 kg)	1996-09-08	Coral Springs, Florida	Coquitlam Express (BCHL)	—
26	(United States)	Marc Johnstone (C)	Junior	F	6' 0" (1.83 m)	180 lb (82 kg)	1996-06-19	Cranford, New Jersey	Chicago Steel (USHL)	—
27	(United States)	Patrick Dawson	Freshman	D	6' 0" (1.83 m)	190 lb (86 kg)	1999-01-14	Medway, Massachusetts	Odessa Jackalopes (NAHL)	—
28	(United States)	Marcel Godbout	Junior	F	5' 9" (1.75 m)	190 lb (86 kg)	1996-06-04	St. Clair Shores, Michigan	Sioux City Musketeers (NAHL)	—
29	(United States)	Todd Goehring	Sophomore	F	5' 11" (1.8 m)	175 lb (79 kg)	1997-07-08	Wayside, New Jersey	Chicago Steel (USHL)	—
30	(United States)	Josh Benson	Sophomore	G	6' 1" (1.85 m)	190 lb (86 kg)	1997-11-04	Stillwater, Minnesota	Fairbanks Ice Dogs (NAHL)	—
33	(Canada)	Luke Lush	Freshman	G	6' 2" (1.88 m)	194 lb (88 kg)	1998-02-15	Sherwood Park, Alberta	Drayton Valley Thunder (AJHL)	—

== Standings ==
2019–20 Atlantic Hockey Standings
	Conference record								Overall record					
	GP	W	L	T	3/SW	PTS	GF	GA	GP	W	L	T	GF	GA
#20 American International	28	21	6	1	0	64	96	46	34	21	12	1	103	68
Sacred Heart	28	18	8	2	0	56	104	63	34	21	10	3	127	82
RIT	28	15	9	4	1	50	86	73	36	19	13	4	108	98
Army	28	14	11	3	3	48	70	64	33	17	13	3	82	76
Niagara	28	12	12	4	2	42	64	65	34	12	18	4	72	87
Air Force	28	10	12	6	5	41	60	67	34	10	18	6	70	95
Robert Morris	28	11	12	5	3	41	65	65	34	11	18	5	75	90
Bentley	28	13	13	2	0	41	75	80	34	15	16	3	83	94
Canisius	28	9	13	6	3	36	71	83	34	10	18	6	80	109
Holy Cross	28	9	16	3	2	32	67	83	34	10	19	5	80	99
Mercyhurst	28	3	23	2	0	11	49	118	34	5	27	2	64	141
Championship: March 20, 2020 † indicates conference regular season champion; * indicates conference tournament champion Rankings: USCHO.com Top 20 Poll; updated March 1, 2020

== Schedule and results ==
Date	Time	Opponent^{#}	Rank^{#}	Site	TV	Decision	Result	Attendance	Record
Regular season
October 5	7:05 PM	vs. Connecticut*		Webster Bank Arena • Bridgeport, Connecticut		Benson	T 3–3 ^{OT}	703	0–0–1
October 6	3:05 PM	vs. Simon Fraser*		Webster Bank Arena • Bridgeport, Connecticut (Exhibition)		Lush	W 6–1 ^{SOL}	200	
October 11	7:07 PM	at #13 Penn State*		Pegula Ice Arena • University Park, Pennsylvania		Benson	L 2–8	6,062	0–1–1
October 12	4:37 PM	at #13 Penn State*		Pegula Ice Arena • University Park, Pennsylvania		Benson	L 4–5	6,111	0–2–1
October 18	7:05 PM	vs. American International		Webster Bank Arena • Bridgeport, Connecticut		Benson	L 1–2	469	0–3–1 (0–1–0–0)
October 25	7:05 PM	at Niagara		Dwyer Arena • Lewiston, New York		Benson	W 4–0	600	1–3–1 (1–1–0–0)
October 26	4:05 PM	at Niagara		Dwyer Arena • Lewiston, New York		Benson	W 3–1	350	2–3–1 (2–1–0–0)
November 1	6:05 PM	vs. Air Force		Webster Bank Arena • Bridgeport, Connecticut		Benson	W 7–1	272	3–3–1 (3–1–0–0)
November 2	1:04 PM	vs. Air Force		Webster Bank Arena • Bridgeport, Connecticut		Benson	L 3–4	271	3–4–1 (3–2–0–0)
November 7	7:05 PM	vs. Holy Cross		Webster Bank Arena • Bridgeport, Connecticut		Benson	L 1–2	233	3–5–1 (3–3–0–0)
November 8	7:05 PM	at Holy Cross		Hart Center • Worcester, Massachusetts		Benson	W 4–2	1,052	4–5–1 (4–3–0–0)
November 15	7:05 PM	at RIT		Gene Polisseni Center • Henrietta, New York		Benson	W 9–5	2,193	5–5–1 (5–3–0–0)
November 16	5:05 PM	at RIT		Gene Polisseni Center • Henrietta, New York		Benson	W 3–1	2,114	6–5–1 (6–3–0–0)
November 21	7:05 PM	at Holy Cross		Webster Bank Arena • Bridgeport, Connecticut		Benson	L 3–4	303	6–6–1 (6–4–0–0)
November 23	7:05 PM	at Holy Cross		Hart Center • Worcester, Massachusetts		Benson	W 4–1	1,052	7–6–1 (7–4–0–0)
November 29	7:05 PM	at Boston University*		Agganis Arena • Boston, Massachusetts		Benson	W 4–0	1,826	8–6–1 (7–4–0–0)
December 3	7:05 PM	at American International		MassMutual Center • Springfield, Massachusetts		Benson	W 4–2	414	9–6–1 (8–4–0–0)
December 7	7:05 PM	vs. Robert Morris		Webster Bank Arena • Bridgeport, Connecticut		Benson	W 6–0	256	10–6–1 (9–4–0–0)
December 8	4:05 PM	vs. Robert Morris		Webster Bank Arena • Bridgeport, Connecticut		Benson	W 4–2	142	11–6–1 (10–4–0–0)
December 28	1:05 PM	vs. Bentley	#20	Webster Bank Arena • Bridgeport, Connecticut		Benson	W 4–0	312	12–6–1 (11–4–0–0)
December 29	1:05 PM	vs. Bentley	#20	Webster Bank Arena • Bridgeport, Connecticut		Benson	L 2–3	311	12–7–1 (11–5–0–0)
January 10	7:05 PM	at Mercyhurst		Mercyhurst Ice Center • Erie, Pennsylvania		Benson	W 3–1	752	13–7–1 (12–5–0–0)
January 11	5:05 PM	at Mercyhurst		Mercyhurst Ice Center • Erie, Pennsylvania		Benson	W 9–3	759	14–7–1 (13–5–0–0)
January 17	6:05 PM	vs. Canisius		Webster Bank Arena • Bridgeport, Connecticut		Benson	T 3–3 ^{3x3 OTL}	256	14–7–2 (13–5–1–0)
January 18	1:05 PM	vs. Canisius		Webster Bank Arena • Bridgeport, Connecticut		Benson	L 2–5	221	14–8–2 (13–6–1–0)
Connecticut Ice
January 25	7:30 PM	vs. Yale*		Webster Bank Arena • Bridgeport, Connecticut (Connecticut Ice Semifinal)	SNY	Benson	W 6–2	5,724	15–8–2 (13–6–1–0)
January 26	7:00 PM	vs. #17 Quinnipiac*		Webster Bank Arena • Bridgeport, Connecticut (Connecticut Ice Championship)	SNY	Benson	W 4–1	4,631	16–8–2 (13–6–1–0)
January 31	9:05 PM	at Air Force	#20	Cadet Ice Arena • Colorado Springs, Colorado		Benson	W 5–4 ^{OT}	1,759	17–8–2 (14–6–1–0)
February 1	7:05 PM	at Air Force	#20	Cadet Ice Arena • Colorado Springs, Colorado		Benson	W 5–2	1,981	18–8–2 (15–6–1–0)
February 11	7:05 PM	at American International	#20	MassMutual Center • Springfield, Massachusetts		Benson	L 2–6	727	18–9–2 (15–7–1–0)
February 15	1:05 PM	vs. Niagara	#20	Webster Bank Arena • Bridgeport, Connecticut		Benson	W 6–0	437	19–9–2 (16–7–1–0)
February 16	1:05 PM	vs. Niagara	#20	Webster Bank Arena • Bridgeport, Connecticut		Benson	L 1–6	401	19–10–2 (16–8–1–0)
February 21	7:05 PM	at Army		Tate Rink • West Point, New York		Benson	W 3–0	1,718	20–10–2 (17–8–1–0)
February 22	7:05 PM	at Army		Tate Rink • West Point, New York		Benson	T 3–3 ^{SOL}	2,207	20–10–3 (17–8–2–0)
February 26	7:05 PM	vs. #20 American International		Webster Bank Arena • Bridgeport, Connecticut		Benson	W 5–3	304	21–10–3 (18–8–2–0)
Atlantic Hockey Tournament
Tournament Cancelled
*Non-conference game. ^{#}Rankings from USCHO.com Poll. All times are in Eastern Time.

== Scoring Statistics ==
Name	Position	Games	Goals	Assists	Points	PIM
Jason Cotton	C	34	20	17	37	14
Mike Lee	D	33	5	28	33	20
Austin McIlmurray	RW	34	18	14	32	6
Matt Tugnutt	RW/C	31	14	16	30	17
Braeden Tuck	F	34	5	23	28	2
Marc Johnstone	RW	34	9	18	27	14
Jordan Kaplan	F	34	9	15	24	12
Austin Magera	C	34	8	15	23	26
Vito Bavaro	RW	33	16	5	21	22
Ryan Steele	F	34	7	13	20	24
Alex Bates	D	33	2	12	14	22
Jeppe Urup Morgensen	D	34	2	10	12	2
Nick Boyagian	F	31	3	8	11	10
Evan Wisocky	C	20	3	7	10	14
Todd Goehring	F	30	2	8	10	19
Max Luukko	D	31	2	6	8	10
Michael Gilroy	D	19	2	5	7	4
Patrick Dawson	D	21	1	6	7	10
Marcus Joseph	D	31	1	3	4	16
Kevin Lombardi	RW	24	1	2	3	4
Marcel Godbout	C/RW	5	2	0	2	0
Luke Lush	G	4	0	2	2	0
Derek Contessa	RW	12	0	2	2	2
Daniel Petrick	D	14	0	2	2	4
Josh Benson	G	33	0	1	1	0
Colin Bernard	D	3	0	0	0	2
Tim Clifton	F	3	0	0	0	2
Bench	-	-	-	-	-	8
Total			132	238	370	286

== Goaltending statistics ==
Name	Games	Minutes	Wins	Losses	Ties	Goals against	Saves	Shut outs	SV %	GAA
Luke Lush	4	113	1	0	0	4	42	1	.915	2.11
Josh Benson	33	1929	20	10	3	80	768	5	.906	2.49
Empty Net	-	12	-	-	-	1	-	-	-	-
Total	34	2055	21	10	3	85	811	6	.905	2.48

== Rankings ==
Poll	Week																							
Poll	Pre	1	2	3	4	5	6	7	8	9	10	11	12	13	14	15	16	17	18	19	20	21	22	23 (Final)
USCHO.com	NR	NR	NR	NR	NR	NR	NR	NR	NR	NR	20	20	NR	NR	NR	NR	20	20	20	20	NR	NR	NR	NR
USA Today	NR	NR	NR	NR	NR	NR	NR	NR	NR	NR	NR	NR	NR	NR	NR	NR	NR	NR	NR	NR	NR	NR	NR	NR
