= C. J. Marottolo =

American coach and athlete

Current position
- Team: Sacred Heart

Biographical details
- Born: North Haven, CT, USA
- Education: Northeastern University

Playing career
- 1984–1985: Choate Rosemary Hall
- 1985–1989: Northeastern
- 1989–1991: Hockey Club de Metz
- Position: Forward

Coaching career (HC unless noted)
- 1989–1991: Hockey Club de Metz
- 1992–1994: Trinity (assistant)
- 1996–2009: Yale (assistant)
- 2009–Present: Sacred Heart

Head coaching record
- Overall: 232–318–63 (.430)

Accomplishments and honors

Awards
- 2010 Atlantic Hockey Coach of the Year

C. J. Marottolo is an American ice hockey coach and former player. He is currently the head coach Sacred Heart and was previously an assistant at Yale.

== Career ==
Marottolo joined the program at Northeastern in 1985 and remained with the team for four seasons. During his time with the Huskies Marottolo was listed as a member of the team but never played in a game and is not listed as having revived a letter. After graduating Marottolo went to France, joining the French division IV Hockey Club de Metz as a player/coach for two years and also coached the Euro-Sport/Drummond Hockey School. In 1992 Marottolo returned to the North Haven area to serve as an assistant at Trinity in Hartford and later transitioned to the same position at Yale.

Marottolo worked for Yale for thirteen seasons, helping the team reach the NCAA tournament in 1998, the first time the program had done so in 46 years. In 2009 the Bulldogs won their first conference tournament championship and returned to the NCAA bracket. Marottolo was expected to continue his role at Yale until Shaun Hannah, the head coach at nearby Sacred Heart, suddenly resigned a month before the 2009–10 season began. Marottolo was enticed to take over as the fourth head coach in program history.

The team responded to the new hire by winning 10 more games than they had done the year before, finishing the year as runner-up for both the regular season and tournament title in Atlantic Hockey and earning Marottolo the conference coach of the year award. The following year, Sacred Heart dropped in the standings and remained there for three years, winning a school-low 2 games in 2013. After the three-year slump the Pioneers started to recover and produced double-digit wins in each of the following five seasons, but weren't able to produce a winning record. Despite the lack of regular season success Sacred Heart has been able to produce a small modicum of positive postseason results, winning three series over eight seasons despite being a lower seed.

== College head coaching record ==
Record table
Season	Coach	Overall	Conference	Standing	Postseason
Sacred Heart Pioneers (Atlantic Hockey) (2009–2024)
2009–10	Sacred Heart	21–13–4	16–9–3	2nd	Atlantic Hockey Runner-Up
2010–11	Sacred Heart	6–25–6	5–16–6	5th	Atlantic Hockey Quarterfinals
2011–12	Sacred Heart	6–28–3	4–20–3	T–11th	Atlantic Hockey First Round
2012–13	Sacred Heart	2–30–4	2–21–4	12th	Atlantic Hockey First Round
2013–14	Sacred Heart	12–24–0	11–16–0	10th	Atlantic Hockey First Round
2014–15	Sacred Heart	13–19–6	10–12–6	8th	Atlantic Hockey Quarterfinals
2015–16	Sacred Heart	13–20–4	10–15–3	9th	Atlantic Hockey First Round
2016–17	Sacred Heart	23–19–5	10–15–3	9th	Atlantic Hockey First Round
2017–18	Sacred Heart	13–22–4	9–15–4	11th	Atlantic Hockey Quarterfinals
2018–19	Sacred Heart	16–17–4	14–11–3	4th	Atlantic Hockey First Round
2019–20	Sacred Heart	21–10–3	18–8–2	2nd	Tournament Cancelled
2020–21	Sacred Heart	6–10–2	6–6–1	6th	Atlantic Hockey Quarterfinals
2021–22	Sacred Heart	15–18–4	11–12–3	5th	Atlantic Hockey Quarterfinals
2022–23	Sacred Heart	17–17–3	14–9–3	3rd	Atlantic Hockey Quarterfinals
2023–24	Sacred Heart	14–19–3	14–10–2	3rd	Atlantic Hockey Quarterfinals
Sacred Heart:		188–291–55	154–195–47		
Sacred Heart Pioneers (AHA) (2024–present)
2024–25	Sacred Heart	21–13–5	16–7–3	2nd	AHA Semifinals
2025–26	Sacred Heart	23–14–3	15–8–3	2nd	AHA Runner-up
Sacred Heart:		44–27–8	31–15–6		
Total:		232–318–63			
National champion Postseason invitational champion Conference regular season champion Conference regular season and conference tournament champion Division regular season champion Division regular season and conference tournament champion Conference tournament champion

Awards and achievements
Preceded by Ryan Soderquist	Atlantic Hockey Coach of the Year; 2009–10	Succeeded by Paul Pearl
