= Shaun Hannah =

Canadian ice hockey player and coach (born 1972)

Biographical details
- Born: July 26, 1972 (age 54); Mankota, SK, CAN
- Education: Cornell University

Playing career
- 1990–1994: Cornell
- 1994–1995: Syracuse Crunch
- 1995–1996: Knoxville Cherokees
- Position: Forward

Coaching career (HC unless noted)
- 1996–2009: Sacred Heart

Head coaching record
- Overall: 191–204–38 (.485)

Accomplishments and honors

Awards
- 2000 MAAC Coach of the Year

Shaun Hannah is a Canadian ice hockey coach and former player. He is currently director and coach of the Yale University 8-U and learn-to-skate programs. Previously he was the head coach for Sacred Heart during their transition from Division III to Division I and the shift from the MAAC to Atlantic Hockey.

== Career ==
Hannah began his college hockey career with Cornell in 1990 joining a strong team that finished second in the ECAC. Though the Big Red fell in the semifinals they squeaked into the NCAA tournament with the final eastern berth. In the first game Hannah's team surprised the western 3rd-seeded Michigan with a 5–4 win in overtime but lost the next two games by a combined 15–7 to drop the series. Cornell's record slipped the next season but the Big Red were able to make the conference championship and have a respectable finish to their year. In Hannah's third season the Big Red posted a dismal record, winning only 6 games and failing to even make the conference tournament. There was a small rebound in his senior season, where he was named as team captain, but Cornell was knocked out of the ECAC tournament in the quarterfinals. After graduating with a degree in business management he played two years of professional hockey before retiring.

In 1996 Sacred Heart, a program that was only three years old at the time, was looking for its third head coach and Hannah accepted the position. In Hannah's first season he was able to get the Pioneers to post their first winning season and just over a year later Sacred Heart joined the Division I ranks when it became a founding member of the MAAC ice hockey division. Sacred Heart joined the MAAC as an associate member to fulfill the conference's obligation and the inexperience of the program showed their first year when the team went 7–23–1. A year later, however, the Pioneers had a winning record and the team continued to post good results. Unfortunately the Pioneers could produce very little postseason success and lost five of their six conference playoffs games.

In 2003 both Iona and Fairfield dropped their program and with only one full member left with a hockey program, the MAAC was able to end the division. The remaining nine members then founded a new ice hockey-only conference called Atlantic Hockey. Hannah's team responded positively to the new conference by finishing as runner-up in the first tournament. The Pioneers continued to finish in the middle of the conference for several years until Hannah pushed them to their first 20-win season in 2005–06 with was matched the following year. Sacred Heart slipped to 8th-place by 2009 and though the team was positioned for a rebound Hannah announced that he was stepping down a month before the 2009–10 season saying that he wanted to pursue other career options.

== Head coaching record ==
Record table
Season	Team	Overall	Conference	Standing	Postseason
Sacred Heart Pioneers (ECAC North/South/Central) (1996–1998)
1996–97	Sacred Heart	15–10–0	10–4–0	2nd	
1997–98	Sacred Heart	13–12–0	9–7–0		
Sacred Heart:		28–22–0	19–11–0		
Sacred Heart Pioneers (MAAC) (1998–2003)
1998–99	Sacred Heart	7–23–1	7–20–1	7th	MAAC Quarterfinals
1999–00	Sacred Heart	16–15–3	14–10–3	T–4th	MAAC Quarterfinals
2000–01	Sacred Heart	14–12–5	11–10–5	T–5th	MAAC Quarterfinals
2001–02	Sacred Heart	16–14–4	15–8–3	T-3rd	MAAC Semifinals
2002–03	Sacred Heart	14–15–6	13–10–3	T-3rd	MAAC Quarterfinals
Sacred Heart:		67–79–19	60–58–15		
Sacred Heart Pioneers (Atlantic Hockey) (2003–2009)
2003–04	Sacred Heart	14–17–5	12–8–4	4th	Atlantic Hockey Runner-Up
2004–05	Sacred Heart	13–21–1	13–10–1	5th	Atlantic Hockey Quarterfinals
2005–06	Sacred Heart	21–12–2	18–8–2	3rd	Atlantic Hockey Quarterfinals
2006–07	Sacred Heart	21–11–4	17–7–4	2nd	Atlantic Hockey Semifinals
2007–08	Sacred Heart	16–19–3	14–11–3	4th	Atlantic Hockey Four vs. Five
2008–09	Sacred Heart	11–23–4	9–16–3	8th	Atlantic Hockey Quarterfinals
Holy Cross:		96–103–19	83–60–17		
Total:		191–204–38			
National champion Postseason invitational champion Conference regular season champion Conference regular season and conference tournament champion Division regular season champion Division regular season and conference tournament champion Conference tournament champion

Awards and achievements
Preceded by Gary Wright	MAAC Coach of the Year; 1999–00	Succeeded by Rick Gotkin
