= Sacred Heart Pioneers men's ice hockey =

- Current season
- University: Sacred Heart University
- Conference: AHA
- Head coach: C. J. Marottolo; 18th season, 232–318–63 (.430)
- Assistant coaches: Scott McDougall; Steve Bergin; Chris Azzano
- Arena: Martire Family Arena; Fairfield, Connecticut
- Colors: Red and white

The Sacred Heart Pioneers men's ice hockey team is a National Collegiate Athletic Association (NCAA) Division I college ice hockey program that represents Sacred Heart University. The Pioneers, members of Atlantic Hockey America, play at the Martire Family Arena in Fairfield, Connecticut. From 1993–2016, the Pioneers home arena was the Milford Ice Pavilion in Milford, Connecticut.

== History ==
=== Division III ===
Sacred Heart began sponsoring men's ice hockey as a varsity sport in 1993. The team was placed in the South Division of ECAC North/South/Central and because they were not able to schedule all of their ECAC South opponents twice the Pioneers played half a conference schedule in their inaugural year. With a full conference slate the following year, Sacred Heart greatly improved their record which continued in year three.

For the 1996–97 season Shaun Hannah was brought in as head coach and the Pioneers finished with their first winning record and 2nd in the division, narrowly missing the conference postseason.

In the late 1990s the MAAC was mandated to form an ice hockey conference. Two of the ECAC South programs would have to promote themselves to Division I and soon after they were joined by Sacred Heart. With an eye for their new conference, Hannah began offering scholarships to incoming students, a violation of Division III rules, which caused the Pioneers (along with two other ECAC South teams) to be ruled ineligible for any postseason play. Additionally all of their conference games would not be counted in the standings, through they would still be able to play the matches and count the results towards their overall standings.

=== MAAC ===
Despite the influx of scholarship athletes, Sacred Heart finished 7th in the first year of MAAC conference play. The team rebounded in the second year, doubling their win total and finishing with a winning record. Postseason success was a little slower in coming with the Pioneers unable to win a playoff game until year 4 of D-I play. During the 2002–03 season Iona and Fairfield, the two original MAAC programs, both announced that they would end their sponsorship of ice hockey at the end of the season. With only one full-time member still active the MAAC terminated their ice hockey division. The remaining 9 programs banded together and formed the Atlantic Hockey Association which began the following year.

=== Atlantic Hockey Association ===
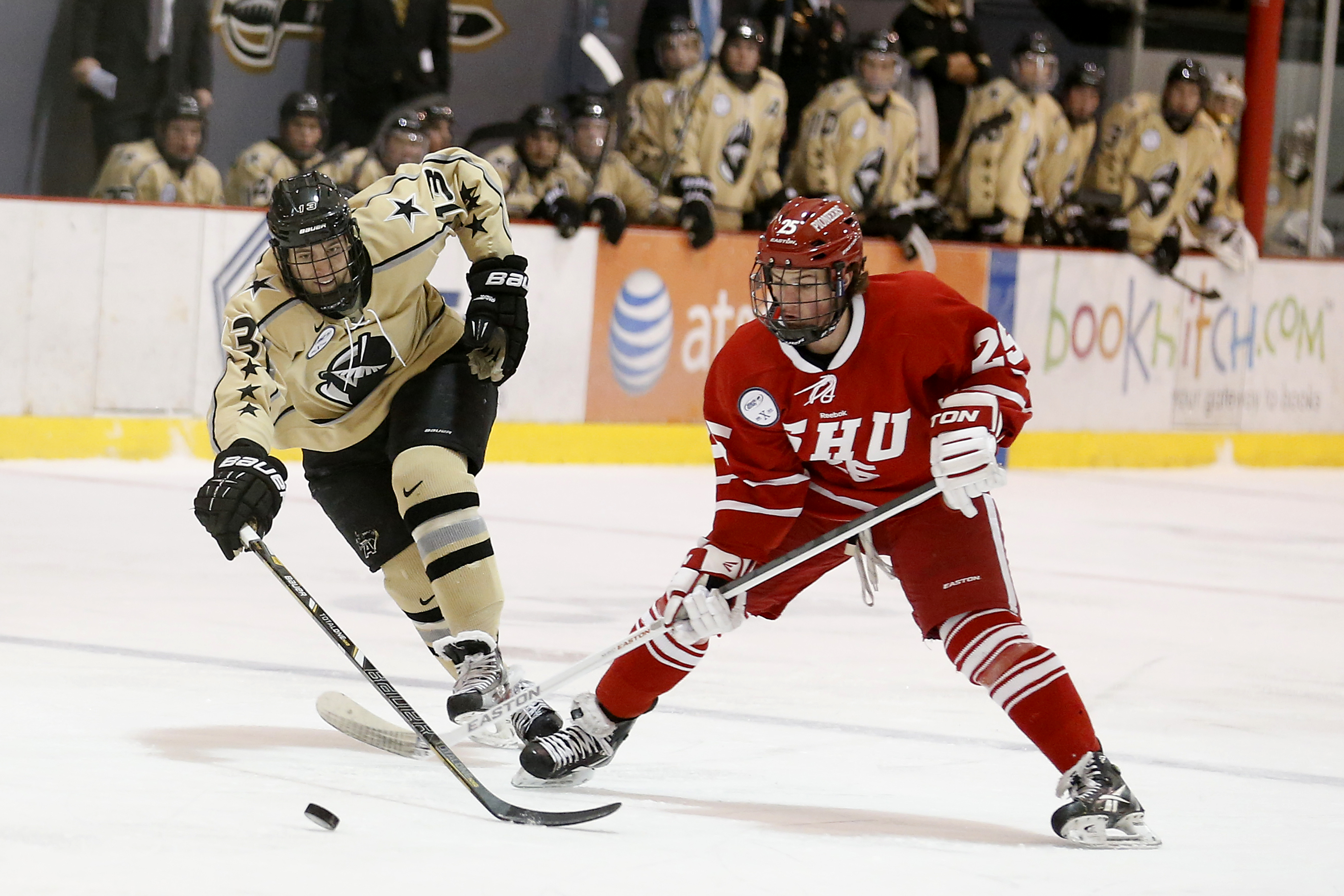
A game between Sacred Heart and Army in 2012

Sacred Heart played well for the first few years of Atlantic Hockey, reaching the championship game in 2004 and 2010 but after Hannah left in 2009, the team took a tumble down the standings. From 2011 through 2018 the Pioneers never finished higher than 8th in the conference. Bench boss C. J. Marottolo was finally able to push the Pioneers out of the basement in 2019 with a 4th-place finish, ending 1 win shy of .500 on the year.

The school announced in 2020 that it would build a $60 million facility for its men's and women's ice hockey programs. After a delayed start, construction began on the Martire Family Arena in March 2021, with a new scheduled completion date of 2023 and a new price tag of $70 million. Martire Family Arena became Sacred Heart's first on-campus ice arena.

=== Atlantic Hockey America ===
Shortly after the 2023–24 season, the Atlantic Hockey Association merged with College Hockey America, a women-only league, to form the new Atlantic Hockey America. The two conferences had a longstanding relationship before the merger, having shared a commissioner and conference staff since 2010. All members of the Association and CHA became members of the merged league.

== Records vs. current Atlantic Hockey America teams ==
As of the completion of 2025–26 season

School	Team	Away Arena	Overall record	Win %	Last Result
Air Force Academy	Falcons	Cadet Ice Arena	24–36–7	.410	0–2 L
Army West Point	Black Knights	Tate Rink	38–41–16	.484	4–3 W
Bentley University	Falcons	Bentley Arena	46–43–8	.515	2–3 L
Canisius College	Golden Griffins	LECOM Harborcenter	31–34–10	.480	3–2 W
College of the Holy Cross	Crusaders	Hart Center	44–50–7	.470	5–2 W
Niagara University	Purple Eagles	Dwyer Arena	23–22–2	.511	2–1 W
Robert Morris University	Colonials	Colonials Arena	13–24–1	.355	5–0 W
Rochester Institute of Technology	Tigers	Gene Polisseni Center	21–34–3	.388	3–0 W

== Coaches ==
As of completion of 2025–26 season

Tenure	Coach	Years	Record	Pct.
1993–1994	Pete Downey	1	4–15–0	.211
1994–1996	John Glynne	2	21–25–2	.458
1996–2009	Shaun Hannah	13	191–204–38	.485
2009–Present	C. J. Marottolo	17	232–318–63	.430
Totals	4 coaches	33 seasons	448–562–103	.449

== Statistical leaders ==
=== Career points leaders ===
Player	Years	GP	G	A	Pts	PIM
Pierre-Luc O'Brien	2003–2007	142	67	91	158	141
Bear Trapp	2005–2009	139	56	99	155	228
Martin Paquet	1999–2003	129	65	77	142	198
Alexandre Parent	2004–2008	143	54	87	141	105
Dave Jarman	2006–2010	147	47	87	134	122
Garrett Larson	2001–2005	139	55	69	124	233
Justin Danforth	2013–2017	147	42	82	124	125
Eric Delong	2009–2013	143	46	72	118	65
Austin Magera	2018–2023	154	47	69	116	125
Matt Gingera	2008–2012	142	61	48	109	113
Lloyd Marks	1998–2002	120	49	60	109	138

=== Career goaltending leaders ===
GP = Games played; Min = Minutes played; W = Wins; L = Losses; T = Ties; GA = Goals against; SO = Shutouts; SV% = Save percentage; GAA = Goals against average

Minimum 30 games

Player	Years	GP	Min	W	L	T	GA	SO	SV%	GAA
Eddy Ferhi	1999–2003	88	5160	36	35	13	126	7	.917	2.63
Josh Benson	2018–2022	82	4642	41	27	8	206	6	.900	2.66
Justin Robbins	2021–2024	47	2596	17	22	4	115	1	.901	2.66
Luke Lush	2019–2023	51	2611	18	22	3	118	2	.901	2.71
Jason Smith	2003–2007	71	4291	38	29	4	196	2	.912	2.74

Statistics current through the end of the 2025–26 season. Not including active players.

== Current roster ==
As of August 2, 2025.

No.	Nat.	Player	Class	Pos	Height	Weight	DoB	Hometown	Previous team	NHL rights
1	(Canada)	Ajeet Gundarah	Sophomore	G	5' 10" (1.78 m)	181 lb (82 kg)	2003-05-09	Richmond, British Columbia	Surrey Eagles (BCHL)	—
2	(United States)	Aiden VanRooyan	Sophomore	D	6' 2" (1.88 m)	201 lb (91 kg)	2003-04-20	Dakota Dunes, South Dakota	Des Moines Buccaneers (USHL)	—
3	(United States)	Paul Minnehan	Sophomore	F	6' 1" (1.85 m)	172 lb (78 kg)	2003-04-09	Cypress, California	Des Moines Buccaneers (USHL)	—
4	(United States)	John Driscoll	Senior	D	6' 4" (1.93 m)	205 lb (93 kg)	2001-08-19	Eagle, Idaho	Army (AHA)	—
5	(United States)	Luke Amell	Sophomore	D/F	6' 4" (1.93 m)	205 lb (93 kg)	2003-09-02	Mars, Pennsylvania	Maryland Black Bears (NAHL)	—
6	(United States)	Mikey Adamson	Senior	D	5' 9" (1.75 m)	170 lb (77 kg)	2001-08-16	Quincy, Massachusetts	Massachusetts (HEA)	—
8	(United States)	Chase Ramsay	Junior	D	6' 0" (1.83 m)	181 lb (82 kg)	2003-06-10	Granite Springs, New York	Quinnipiac (ECAC)	—
9	(Canada)	Josh Barnes	Senior	F	5' 10" (1.78 m)	175 lb (79 kg)	2002-09-27	Cornwall, Ontario	American International (AHA)	—
10	(United States)	Liam Lesakowski	Junior	D	6' 5" (1.96 m)	220 lb (100 kg)	2003-12-12	Buffalo, New York	Maine (HEA)	—
11	(United States)	Jake Hewitt	Junior	F	5' 10" (1.78 m)	180 lb (82 kg)	2002-07-05	Ashburnham, Massachusetts	Army (AHA)	—
13	(Canada)	Gavin Bryant	Freshman	F	5' 11" (1.8 m)	187 lb (85 kg)	2004-07-24	Ingersoll, Ontario	Peterborough Petes (OHL)	—
14	(Canada)	Jack Hillier	Freshman	F	6' 2" (1.88 m)	159 lb (72 kg)	2004-10-08	Petawawa, Ontario	New Jersey Titans (NAHL)	—
17	(United States)	Vitaly Levyy	Sophomore	F	5' 11" (1.8 m)	170 lb (77 kg)	2003-05-09	Old Brookville, New York	Langley Rivermen (BCHL)	—
19	(United States)	Jake Bongo	Junior	F	5' 10" (1.78 m)	170 lb (77 kg)	2002-02-04	Ridgefield, Connecticut	Surrey Eagles (BCHL)	—
20	(Canada)	David Brandes	Freshman	D	5' 10" (1.78 m)	179 lb (81 kg)	2004-01-24	Toronto, Ontario	Coquitlam Express (BCHL)	—
21	(United States)	Noah Ellis	Senior	D	6' 3" (1.91 m)	192 lb (87 kg)	2002-02-01	Urbandale, Iowa	Omaha (NCHC)	VGK, 184th overall 2020
22	(Canada)	Noah Van Vliet	Freshman	D	6' 2" (1.88 m)	225 lb (102 kg)	2004-02-18	Toronto, Ontario	Niagara IceDogs (OHL)	—
23	(Switzerland)	Ray Fust	Senior	F	6' 3" (1.91 m)	204 lb (93 kg)	2002-10-23	Bellinzona, Switzerland	Clarkson (ECAC)	—
24	(United States)	Michael Rubin	Sophomore	D	6' 1" (1.85 m)	183 lb (83 kg)	2003-05-05	Blauvelt, New York	Coquitlam Express (BCHL)	—
25	(Canada)	Jérémi Tremblay	Sophomore	F	6' 1" (1.85 m)	190 lb (86 kg)	2003-01-01	Quebec City, Quebec	Maryland Black Bears (NAHL)	—
27	(Canada)	Cole Galata	Junior	F	5' 10" (1.78 m)	175 lb (79 kg)	2002-03-18	Barrie, Ontario	Surrey Eagles (BCHL)	—
28	(Canada)	Marcus Joughin	Senior	F	5' 11" (1.8 m)	180 lb (82 kg)	2001-07-05	Tecumseh, Ontario	West Kelowna Warriors (BCHL)	—
30	(United States)	Jack Spicer	Sophomore	G	6' 1" (1.85 m)	185 lb (84 kg)	2004-04-28	Rockville, Maryland	Lone Star Brahmas (NAHL)	—
33	(Canada)	Teagan Kendrick	Freshman	G	6' 4" (1.93 m)	201 lb (91 kg)	2004-02-08	St. Albert, Alberta	Trail Smoke Eaters (BCHL)	—
71	(Canada)	Stéphane Huard	Junior	F	5' 8" (1.73 m)	179 lb (81 kg)	2002-01-06	Blainville, Quebec	McGill (OUA)	—
72	(United States)	Connor Smith	Graduate	G	5' 8" (1.73 m)	150 lb (68 kg)		West Haven, Connecticut	Sacred Heart (ACHA)	—
77	(Canada)	Félix Trudeau	Senior	F	6' 2" (1.88 m)	189 lb (86 kg)	2002-09-24	Terrebonne, Quebec	Maine (HEA)	—
86	(Canada)	Charles-Edward Tardif	Sophomore	F	6' 0" (1.83 m)	201 lb (91 kg)	2003-03-03	Quebec City, Quebec	Maine Nordiques (NAHL)	—
91	(United States)	Reid Pabich	Senior	F	5' 11" (1.8 m)	175 lb (79 kg)	2001-10-05	Verona, Wisconsin	Maine (HEA)	—
98	(United States)	Ethan Wolthers	Senior	F	5' 8" (1.73 m)	155 lb (70 kg)	2001-07-19	Valencia, California	Western Michigan (NCHC)	—

== Awards and honors ==
=== NCAA ===
AHCA Second Team All-Americans

- 2009–10: Nick Johnson, F
- 2019–20: Mike Lee, D; Jason Cotton, F

=== MAAC ===
==== Individual awards ====
Goaltender of the Year

- Eddy Ferhi: 2003

Offensive rookie of the year

- Martin Paquet: 2000

Coaches of the Year

- Shaun Hannah: 2000

==== All-Conference Teams ====
First Team All-MAAC

- 2002–03: Eddy Ferhi, G; Les Hrapchak, D; Martin Paquet, F

Second team all-maac

- 1999–00: Alexis Jutras-Binet, G; Martin Paquet, F
- 2000–01: Eddy Ferhi, G
- 2001–02: Eddy Ferhi, G; Martin Paquet, F

MAAC All-Rookie Team

- 1999–00: Les Hrapchak, D; Martin Paquet, F

=== Atlantic Hockey Association ===
==== Individual awards ====
Player of the Year

- Jason Cotton: 2020

Best Defensive Forward

- Dave Jarman: 2010

Rookie of the Year

- Pierre-Luc O'Brien: 2004
- Bear Trapp: 2006
- Justin Danforth: 2014
- Braeden Tuck: 2020

Individual Sportsmanship Award

- Alexandre Parent: 2008
- Eric Delong: 2013
- Braeden Tuck: 2023, 2024

Regular Season Scoring Trophy

- Neil Shea: 2022

Coach of the Year

- C. J. Marottolo: 2010

==== All-Conference Teams ====
First Team All-Atlantic Hockey

- 2004–05: Pierre-Luc O'Brien, F
- 2005–06: Jason Smith, G; Pierre-Luc O'Brien, F
- 2006–07: Jason Smith, G; Scott Marchesi, D; Pierre-Luc O'Brien, F
- 2007–08: Alexandre Parent, F
- 2009–10: Nick Johnson, F
- 2016–17: Justin Danforth, F
- 2017–18: Cameron Heath, F; Dylan McLaughlin, F
- 2018–19: Dylan McLaughlin, F
- 2019–20: Mike Lee, D; Jason Cotton, F; Austin McIlmurray, F
- 2020–21: Marc Johnstone, F
- 2022–23: Neil Shea, F

Second Team All-Atlantic Hockey

- 2003–04: Konn Hawkes, D; Garrett Larson, F
- 2004–05: Kalen Wright, F
- 2005–06: Alexandre Parent, F
- 2007–08: Scott Marchesi, F; Bear Trapp, F
- 2015–16: Justin Danforth, F
- 2016–17: Cameron Heath, D; Ryan Schmelzer, F
- 2017–18: Lester Lancaster, D
- 2020–21: Braeden Tuck, F
- 2021–22: Logan Britt, D; Neil Shea, F

Third Team All-Atlantic Hockey

- 2009–10: Paul Ferraro, D; Dave Jarman, F
- 2011–12: Matt Gingera, F
- 2012–13: Eric Delong, F
- 2018–19: Austin Magera, F
- 2019–20: Josh Benson, G
- 2021–22: Braeden Tuck, F
- 2022–23: Hunter Sansbury, F
- 2023–24: John Jaworski, F

Atlantic Hockey All-Rookie Team

- 2003–04: Pierre-Luc O'Brien, F
- 2004–05: Scott Marchesi, D; Alexandre Parent, F
- 2005–06: Bear Trapp, F
- 2009–10: Steven Legato, G; Eric Delong, F
- 2013–14: Mitch Nylen, F; Justin Danforth, F
- 2017–18: Marc Johnstone, F
- 2018–19: Josh Benson, G; Austin Magera, F
- 2019–20: Braeden Tuck, F
- 2022–23: Marcus Joughin, F

=== Atlantic Hockey America ===
==== Individual awards ====
Player of the Year

- Félix Trudeau (2026)

Forward of the Year

- Félix Trudeau (2026)

==== All-Conference teams ====
First Team All-Atlantic Hockey America

- 2025–26: Mikey Adamson, D; Félix Trudeau, F

Second Team All-Atlantic Hockey America

- 2024–25: Mikey Adamson, D; Félix Trudeau, F

Third Team All-Atlantic Hockey America

- 2024–25: Ajeet Gundarah, G; Hunter Sansbury, D

All-Atlantic Hockey America Rookie Team

- 2024–25: Ajeet Gundarah, G

== Pioneers in the NHL ==
As of July 1, 2025.

Player	Position	Team(s)	Years	Games	Stanley Cups
Justin Danforth	Right wing	CBJ	2021–Present	183	0
Marc Johnstone	Right wing	PIT	2023–2024	1	0

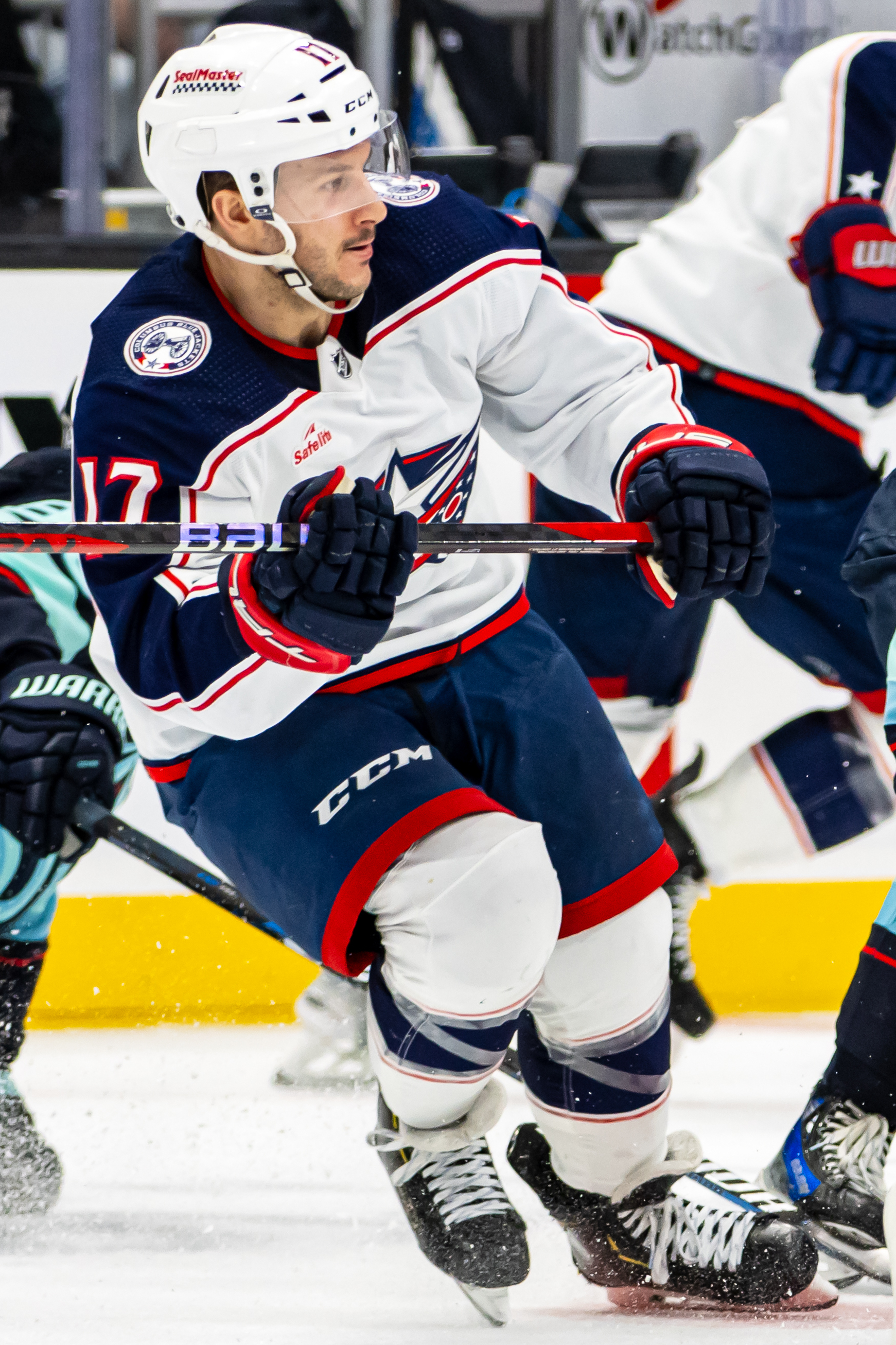
Justin Danforth

== See also ==
- Sacred Heart Pioneers women's ice hockey
