= Robert Morris University Island Sports Center =

Indoor stadium in Pittsburgh, Pennsylvania

Coordinates: 40°31′7″N 80°9′0″W

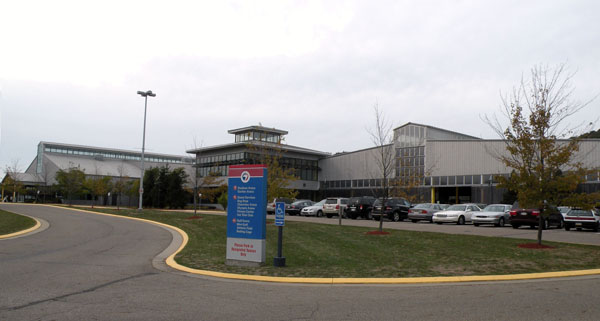
Exterior of Robert Morris University Island Sports Center

The Robert Morris University Island Sports Center (abbreviated RMU Island Sports Center) is a sports complex located in the Pittsburgh suburb of Neville Island in Allegheny County, Pennsylvania, United States. The RMU Island Sports Center opened in 1998, and houses several ice and inline skating rinks, a golf range, a miniature golf course, athletic fields, a strength and fitness center, a bistro and a pro shop. In 2003, Robert Morris University bought a Superfund site's land (called Ohio River Park) from Neville Land Company for 2.7 million; the EPA still monitored the site as of 2018. A boathouse was added in October 2016. The complex is accessible via exit 65 of Interstate 79.

== Clearview Arena ==
Clearview Arena

- Location in Pennsylvania Location in the United States
- Former names: RMU Island Sports Center Ice Arena (1998–2012); 84 Lumber Arena (2012–2017); Colonials Arena (2017–2020)
- Location: 7600 Grand Avenue; Neville Township, Pennsylvania, U.S.
- Owner: Robert Morris University
- Operator: Robert Morris University
- Capacity: 1,200 (hockey)
- Surface: 200' x 85' (hockey)

Construction
- Opened: October 1998

Tenants
- Pittsburgh Forge (NAHL) (2001–2003); Robert Morris Colonials (NCAA) (2004–2021, 2023–present)

Clearview Arena (formerly the RMU Island Sports Center Ice Arena, 84 Lumber Arena and Colonials Arena) is a 1,200-seat ice hockey rink located in the RMU Island Sports Center. Robert Morris University and 84 Lumber reached a deal by which 84 Lumber would receive naming rights as of March 21, 2012. The arena later dropped the 84 Lumber name before the 2017–18 season and reverted to being known as the Colonials Arena at the RMU Island Sports Center. Announced on October 13, 2020, the arena would be renamed Clearview Arena after securing a naming rights deal with Clearview Federal Credit Union.

It is home to the Robert Morris Colonials men's and women's NCAA Division I ice hockey teams that compete in Atlantic Hockey and College Hockey America respectively, as well as RMU's club hockey team competing at the ACHA Division I level in the College Hockey Mid-America conference (CHMA) and various local youth hockey programs. In addition, it is home to the Pittsburgh Curling Club.

The arena served as the former home of the Pittsburgh Forge Junior-A NAHL team, which moved to Toledo, Ohio in 2003. The Pittsburgh Forge are now known as the Corpus Christi IceRays as of 2020.

== Teams ==
Team	League	Years active
Robert Morris Colonials	Atlantic Hockey (NCAA Division I)	2004–2021, 2023–
Robert Morris Lady Colonials	College Hockey America (NCAA Division I)	2005–2021, 2023–
Robert Morris Colonials	College Hockey Mid-America (ACHA)	

== Gallery ==
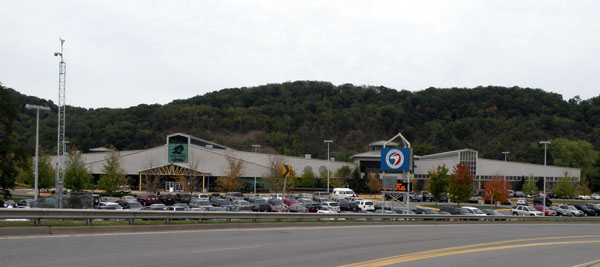
Another view of the Island Sports Center.

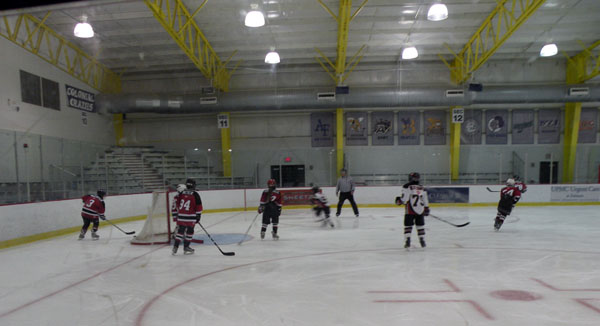
A youth ice hockey game at the Island Sports Center on September 26, 2010.

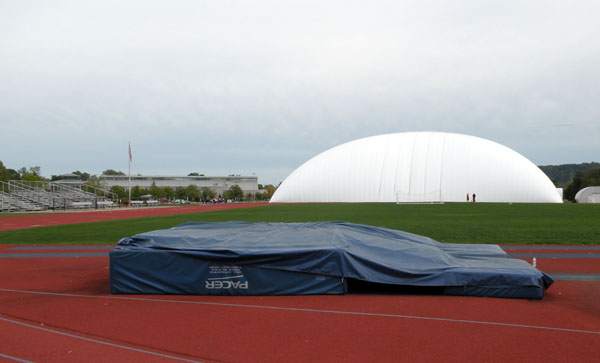
The track and field at the Island Sports Center.
