= Frank Marotte =

Canadian ice hockey player

- Born: May 1, 1995 (age 30) Longueuil, Quebec, Canada
- Height: 6 ft 1 in (185 cm)
- Weight: 194 lb (88 kg; 13 st 12 lb)
- Position: Goaltender
- Caught: Left
- Played for: Bridgeport Sound Tigers; San Diego Gulls; Dundee Stars
- NHL draft: Undrafted
- Playing career: 2020–2023

Francis Marotte (born May 1, 1995) is a Canadian former ice hockey goaltender. He was an All-American for Clarkson.

== Playing career ==
Marotte began his college career with Robert Morris in 2016. He became the team's starter as a freshman and was one of the top goaltenders in the nation. Marotte remained the team's primary goaltender for the next two seasons but as the team's play declined, so did his numbers. Marotte graduated from Robert Morris University after just three years and was able to use the graduate transfer rules to join the ice hockey team at Clarkson without having to sit out a season. For his final season of college hockey, Marotte had a tremendous performance, setting several program records for Clarkson and was named an All-American. Unfortunately for Marotte, the COVID-19 pandemic ended the entire college ice hockey season prematurely, with the Golden Knights all but guaranteed an appearance in the NCAA Tournament.

After wrapping up his college career, Marotte signed a professional contract with the New York Islanders and was assigned to minor league system. He was limited to a small number of appearances in his first pro season due to the pandemic, but he did perform well at the ECHL level.

After spells with Allen Americans and San Diego Gulls, Marotte joined UK EIHL side Dundee Stars in October 2022. He left Dundee in November 2022.

== Career statistics ==
Season	Team	League	GP	W	L	T/OTL	MIN	GA	SO	GAA	SV%
2013–14	Cowichan Valley Capitals	BCHL	10	1	5	0	433	35	0	4.85	.864
2014–15	Nepean Raiders	CCHL	36	12	20	2	2062	110	0	3.20	.902
2015–16	Nepean Raiders	CCHL	55	19	29	6	3220	162	1	3.02	.913
2016–17	Robert Morris	Atlantic Hockey	29	17	8	3	1560	54	2	2.08	.931
2017–18	Robert Morris	Atlantic Hockey	38	17	15	3	2063	88	3	2.56	.917
2018–19	Robert Morris	Atlantic Hockey	40	16	21	2	2318	110	3	2.85	.908
2019–20	Clarkson	ECAC Hockey	34	23	8	3	2020	60	4	1.78	.938
2020–21	Bridgeport Sound Tigers	AHL	2	0	0	0	48	3	0	3.76	.800
2020–21	Allen Americans	ECHL	12	8	3	1	732	31	1	2.54	.917
2021–22	San Diego Gulls	AHL	8	3	4	1	433	28	0	3.88	.883
2021–22	Allen Americans	ECHL	20	6	7	3	995	56	0	3.37	.893
2022–23	Dundee Stars	EIHL	4	0	3	0	172	17	0	5.93	.862
2022–23	Adirondack Thunder	ECHL	3	0	2	1	178	11	0	3.70	.872
2022–23	Trois-Rivières Lions	ECHL	16	3	11	0	851	61	0	4.30	.867
CCHL totals			91	31	49	8	5,282	272	1	3.09	.909
NCAA totals			141	73	52	11	7,961	312	12	2.35	.922

== Awards and honors ==
Award	Year
Atlantic Hockey All-Rookie Team	2016–17
All-Atlantic Hockey Third Team	2018–19
All-ECAC Hockey First Team	2019–20
AHCA East Second Team All-American	2019–20

Awards and achievements
Preceded by Andrew Shortridge	Ken Dryden Award; 2019–20	Succeeded by Keith Petruzelli
