= Michael Callahan (ice hockey) =

American ice hockey player (born 1999)

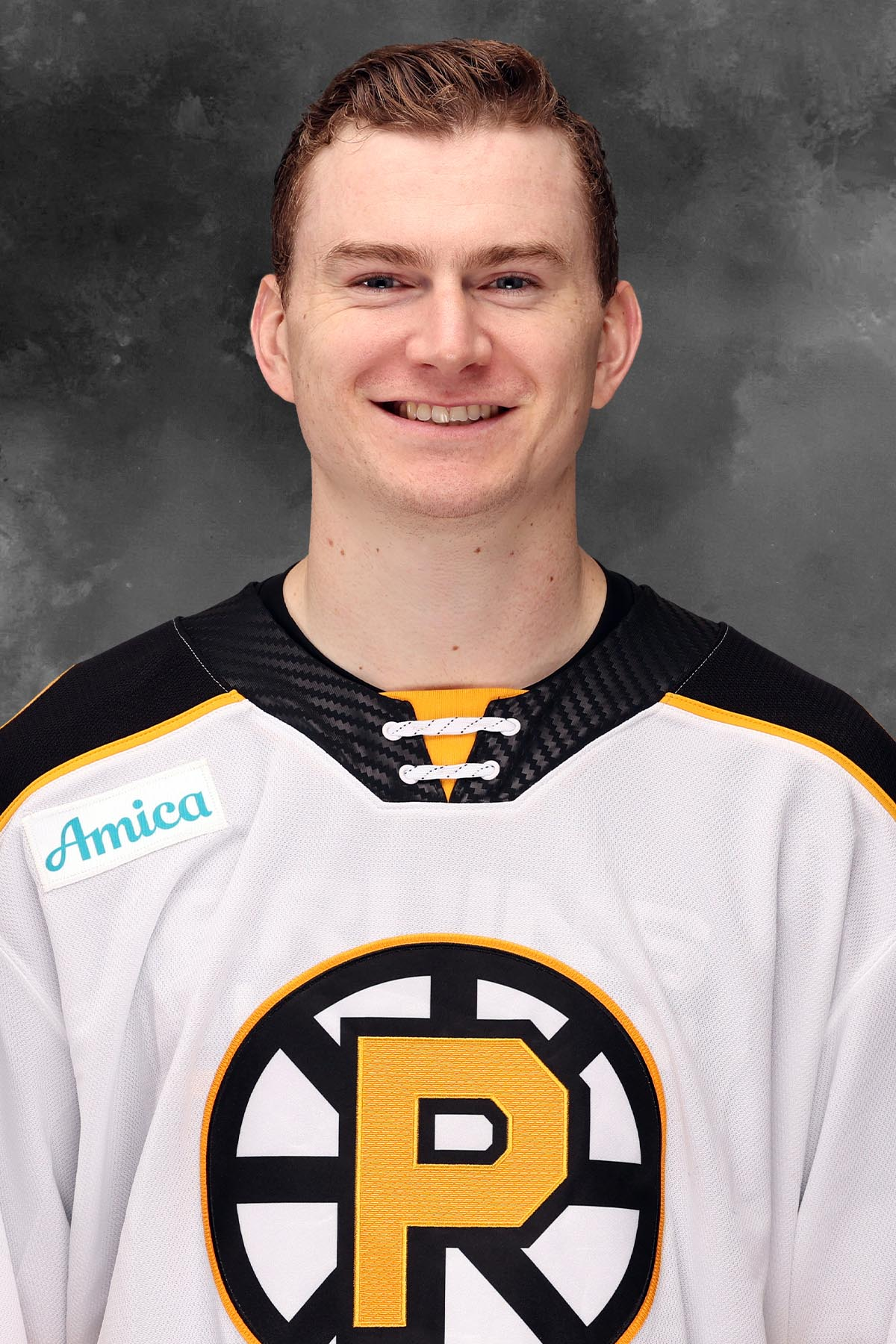
- Callahan with the Providence Bruins in 2023
- Born: September 23, 1999 (age 27) Franklin, Massachusetts, U.S.
- Height: 6 ft 2 in (188 cm)
- Weight: 195 lb (88 kg; 13 st 13 lb)
- Position: Defence
- Shoots: Left
- NHL team (P) Cur. team Former teams: Tampa Bay Lightning; Syracuse Crunch (AHL); Boston Bruins
- NHL draft: 142nd overall, 2018; Arizona Coyotes
- Playing career: 2022–present

Michael Callahan (born September 23, 1999) is an American professional ice hockey defenseman who is currently playing for the Syracuse Crunch of the American Hockey League (AHL) while under contract with the Tampa Bay Lightning of the National Hockey League (NHL). He previously played in the NHL for the Boston Bruins, and played college ice hockey for the Providence Friars of the National Collegiate Athletic Association (NCAA).

== Playing career ==
=== Collegiate ===
Callahan verbally committed to play college ice hockey for Providence College on September 10, 2015, when he was just 16 years old. However, it wouldn't be until the 2018–19 season that he would play for the Friars, as he spent parts of three years in the United States Hockey League (USHL) with the Youngstown Phantoms and Central Illinois Flying Aces/Bloomington Thunder. He was drafted in the fifth round (142nd overall) by the Arizona Coyotes in the 2018 NHL entry draft.

Callahan had a solid freshman year at Providence, being a stable part of the Friars defense. He finished his first year with two goals and eight assists, as well as second on the team in +/- with +19. The Friars would enter the tournament as the #4 ranked team in the nation, and would advance to the Frozen Four, where they'd lose to eventual champions Minnesota Duluth.

Entering his sophomore year, Callahan was named a co-captain of the Friars, a title he'd hold for the rest of his time there. In addition to continuing to be a force on the Friars blue line, he took a major step forward in his offensive production, scoring five goals and 23 assists in 28 games. However, this wouldn't translate to success for the Friars on the ice, as they took a step back, finishing 16–12–6, with a 10-11-3 record in conference play. They were set to play Boston College in the first round of the 2020 Hockey East tournament, but the tournament, as well as the 2020 NCAA tournament, were both cancelled due to the COVID-19 pandemic. Despite the shortened season, his efforts led him to be named a First Team Hockey East All-Star.

Unfortunately, Callahan was not able to replicate his on-ice success in the 2020–21 season, with three goals and eleven assists, but he was still a major part of a Friars team that made it to the semi-final of the 2021 Hockey East tournament. Unfortunately, this effort would fall short and cost them a spot in the 2021 NCAA tournament.

Entering his senior season at Providence, Callahan reproduced his exact offensive statline from the previous season. Unfortunately, the Friars would once again fall short in the Hockey East tournament and miss the NCAA tournament, marking an end to Callahan's college career.

=== Professional ===
On February 23, 2022, while still in the midst of his senior year of college, Callahan's rights were traded by the Coyotes to his hometown Boston Bruins in exchange for a seventh-round pick in the 2024 NHL entry draft.

On March 14, 2022, shortly after the Friars season ended, Callahan signed a two-year, entry-level contract with the Bruins, and was assigned to their AHL affiliate, the Providence Bruins, allowing him to stay in the same city and arena where he played his college hockey. He would score one goal and one assist with the P-Bruins for the rest of the year.

Callahan was set to begin his first full professional season with Providence in the 2022-23 season, and continuing to be a steady presence on his teams blue line despite lacking offensive production. He finished his first full season with a goal and seven assists in 55 games.

Much like his days with the Friars, Callahan was a leader in the locker room, and was named an alternate captain of the team prior to the 2023–24 season. In addition to being a bonafide leader, he also saw a boost in his offensive production, tallying four goals and 17 assists in 70 games.

Callahan would once again be named an alternate captain for the 2024–25 season. In the midst of a successful season, Callahan was named to the 2025 AHL All-Star Classic. A few days later, on January 14, 2025, Callahan was called up to the NHL team for the first time, and made his debut later that day against the Tampa Bay Lightning. After moving back and forth between the two Bruin squads, Callahan scored his first NHL goal and point against the New Jersey Devils on April 8, 2025. After the Bruins season ended, Callahan returned to the AHL to help the Providence Bruins with their playoff run. Callahan would score two assists in eight playoff games before the Bruins were eliminated by the Charlotte Checkers in the divisional round of the 2025 Calder Cup playoffs.

On June 29, 2025, Callahan, a pending restricted free agent, signed a one-year, two-way contract worth $775,000 USD at the NHL level to stay in the Bruins organization.

Callahan was assigned to Providence to start the 2025–26 season, where he was again named an assistant captain. After injuries to the NHL team's defensive corps, Callahan was called up to Boston, where he would play five games, going scoreless, before being sent back to Providence. Callahan would score two goals and 14 assists in 56 games with the P-Bruins, helping them to the top seed in the Calder Cup playoffs, where they would get upset in four games by the Springfield Thunderbirds. Callahan registered a lone goal in the four games.

On July 1, 2026, Callahan would leave the Bruins organization after five seasons, joining the Tampa Bay Lightning on a one-year, two-way contract.

== Career statistics ==
| | | | Regular season | | | | | Playoffs |
| Season | Team | League | GP | G | A | Pts | PIM | GP | G | A | Pts | PIM |
|---|---|---|---|---|---|---|---|---|---|---|---|---|
| 2016–17 | Bloomington Thunder | USHL | 2 | 0 | 0 | 0 | 0 | — | — | — | — | — |
| 2017–18 | Central Illinois Flying Aces | USHL | 37 | 3 | 6 | 9 | 15 | — | — | — | — | — |
| 2017–18 | Youngstown Phantoms | USHL | 22 | 0 | 9 | 9 | 6 | 11 | 0 | 2 | 2 | 2 |
| 2018–19 | Providence College | HE | 41 | 2 | 8 | 10 | 10 | — | — | — | — | — |
| 2019–20 | Providence College | HE | 34 | 5 | 23 | 28 | 20 | — | — | — | — | — |
| 2020–21 | Providence College | HE | 25 | 3 | 11 | 14 | 12 | — | — | — | — | — |
| 2021–22 | Providence College | HE | 38 | 3 | 11 | 14 | 16 | — | — | — | — | — |
| 2021–22 | Providence Bruins | AHL | 15 | 1 | 1 | 2 | 2 | — | — | — | — | — |
| 2022–23 | Providence Bruins | AHL | 55 | 1 | 7 | 8 | 34 | 4 | 0 | 1 | 1 | 5 |
| 2023–24 | Providence Bruins | AHL | 70 | 4 | 13 | 17 | 26 | 4 | 0 | 1 | 1 | 0 |
| 2024–25 | Providence Bruins | AHL | 45 | 1 | 8 | 9 | 30 | 8 | 0 | 2 | 2 | 0 |
| 2024–25 | Boston Bruins | NHL | 17 | 1 | 0 | 1 | 7 | — | — | — | — | — |
| 2025–26 | Providence Bruins | AHL | 56 | 2 | 14 | 16 | 27 | 4 | 0 | 1 | 1 | 2 |
| 2025–26 | Boston Bruins | NHL | 5 | 0 | 0 | 0 | 0 | — | — | — | — | — |
| NHL totals | | | 22 | 1 | 0 | 1 | 7 | — | — | — | — | — |

== Awards and honors ==
| Award | Year |
College
| All-Hockey East First Team | 2020 |
AHL
| All Star Classic | 2025 |
