= John Beecher (ice hockey) =

American ice hockey player (born 2001)

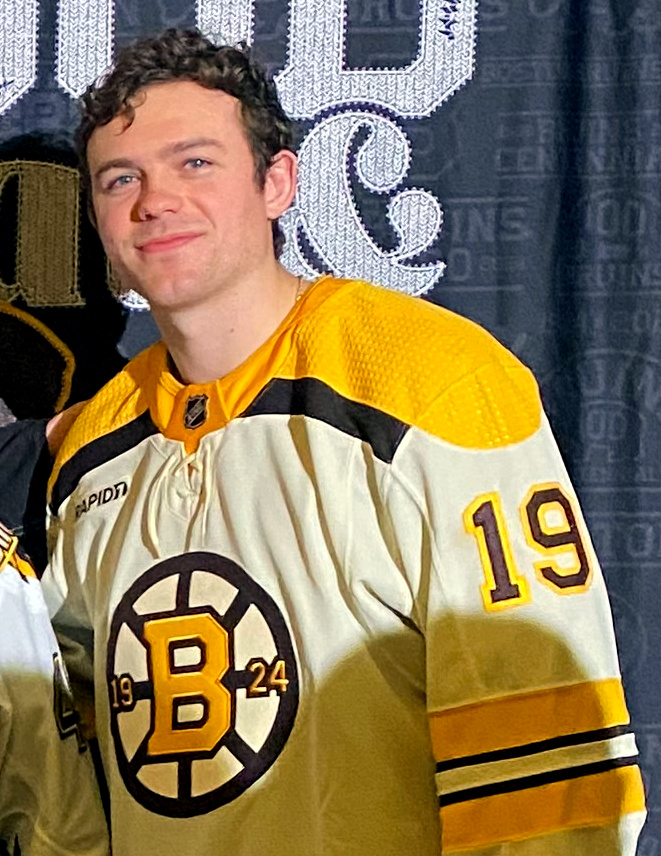
- Beecher with the Boston Bruins in 2023
- Born: April 5, 2001 (age 25) Elmira, New York, U.S.
- Height: 6 ft 3 in (191 cm)
- Weight: 220 lb (100 kg; 15 st 10 lb)
- Position: Center
- Shoots: Left
- NHL team (P) Cur. team Former teams: Florida Panthers; Charlotte Checkers (AHL); Boston Bruins; Calgary Flames
- NHL draft: 30th overall, 2019; Boston Bruins
- Playing career: 2022–present

John Beecher (born April 5, 2001) is an American professional ice hockey player who is a center for the Charlotte Checkers in the American Hockey League (AHL) while under contract to the Florida Panthers of the National Hockey League (NHL). He was drafted 30th overall by the Boston Bruins in the 2019 NHL entry draft. He played college ice hockey for the Michigan Wolverines men's ice hockey team from 2019 to 2022.

== Early life ==
Beecher was born on April 5, 2001, in Elmira, New York to parents Bill and Natasha. Although his parents were collegiate athletes, they did not play ice hockey. His father played lacrosse and golf at Elmira College while his mother ran track and cross-country at Union College. Beecher began ice skating when he was six years old after spending the summer playing roller hockey and immediately made the local travel team. Beyond ice hockey, Beecher also played soccer, football, baseball, and lacrosse. Beecher and his older brother Bryce played together until 2015 when his brother had to get his hips replaced due to him being born with congenital hip dysplasia.

== Playing career ==
=== Collegiate ===
Beecher was drafted 30th overall by the Boston Bruins in the 2019 NHL entry draft, but committed to play for the University of Michigan during the 2019–20 season. He was suspended one game for headbutting on February 3, 2020. Despite this, Beecher had a solid freshmen season with Michigan, scoring nine goals and seven assists. However, both the 2020 Big Ten tournament and the 2020 NCAA tournament were cancelled due to the COVID-19 pandemic, ending the season early.

Beecher started off the 2020–21 season where he left off, scoring four goals and four assists in 16 games. However, on February 28, 2021, it was revealed that Beecher had undergone shoulder surgery for a lingering injury and would miss the rest of the season.

Fully recovered from his injury, Beecher would play a full junior season at Michigan. However, he was unable to build upon his successful freshman year, scoring only six goals and nine assists for 15 points. He would, however, get his first taste of both Big Ten and NCAA tournament action. He would help Michigan win the 2022 Big Ten tournament, securing an auto-bid in the 2022 NCAA tournament, where Michigan would reach the Frozen Four before falling to the eventual champions Denver Pioneers.

=== Professional ===
==== Boston Bruins ====
On April 13, 2022, Beecher decided to forgo his senior season at Michigan, and signed an amateur tryout contract with the Bruins' AHL affiliate, the Providence Bruins, for the remainder of the 2021–22 season. He contributed with 5 points through the remaining 9 regular season games, and made 2 post-season appearances with 1 point for Providence.

On May 16, 2022, Beecher was signed to a three-year, entry-level deal with the Boston Bruins.

Beecher impressed in training camp, and earned himself a spot on the NHL roster to start the 2023–24 season for the Bruins. He would register his first NHL point with an assist on a Brad Marchand goal against the San Jose Sharks. On November 6, 2023, Beecher scored his first NHL goal in a 3-2 win over the Dallas Stars. Incidentally, Bruins rookie defensemen Mason Lohrei, who had played college hockey at Ohio State University, regarded as one of Michigan's rivals, scored his first NHL goal a few minutes after Beecher. On January 20, 2024, Beecher was sent down to Providence. Beecher was called up back to the Bruins for the 2024 Stanley Cup playoffs. He made his playoff debut in Game 1 of the first round against the Toronto Maple Leafs, and on his first playoff shift, scored his first playoff goal and point, opening the scoring for the series.

Beecher hoped to build off his first NHL season, and he impressed to start the 2024–25 season. Playing on the fourth line with newcomers Cole Koepke and Mark Kastelic, Beecher found instant chemistry, scoring five points in the first five games of the season, including his first career multi-point game with a goal and an assist against the Panthers on October 14, 2024. However, Beecher soon went cold, resulting in him being scratched on November 16 against the St. Louis Blues in hopes of gaining a spark. Although he would return to the lineup the game after, Beecher could not reignite his early season success. Starting with December 1, 2024, Beecher would only be able to produce a goal and four assists for the rest of the season. Beecher's struggles were indicative of the Bruins team success as well, as they ended up missing the playoffs. Beecher would finish the season with three goals and eight assists in 78 games.

In the following 2025–26 season, Beecher was unable to replicate his fast start to the previous season, appearing as a depth forward for the Bruins in registering just 1 goal through 6 games over the opening month of the season.

==== Calgary Flames ====
On November 17, 2025, Beecher was placed on waivers by the Bruins and was subsequently claimed the following day by the Calgary Flames. In 29 regular season appearances with the Flames, Beecher posted 2 goals and 6 points in a fourth-line role.

==== Florida Panthers ====
As a free agent from the Flames, Beecher was signed to a one-year, two-way contract with the Florida Panthers for the 2026–27 season on July 1, 2026.

== Career statistics ==
Medal record

Men's ice hockey

Representing United States

World U-17 Hockey Challenge
| Gold medal – first place | 2017 British Columbia | |

World U18 Championships
| Bronze medal – third place | 2019 Sweden | |

=== Regular season and playoffs ===
| | | | Regular season | | | | | Playoffs |
| Season | Team | League | GP | G | A | Pts | PIM | GP | G | A | Pts | PIM |
|---|---|---|---|---|---|---|---|---|---|---|---|---|
| 2017–18 | U.S. National Development Team | USHL | 34 | 9 | 16 | 25 | 18 | 8 | 2 | 5 | 7 | 4 |
| 2018–19 | U.S. National Development Team | USHL | 27 | 6 | 14 | 20 | 64 | — | — | — | — | — |
| 2019–20 | University of Michigan | B1G | 31 | 9 | 7 | 16 | 31 | — | — | — | — | — |
| 2020–21 | University of Michigan | B1G | 16 | 4 | 4 | 8 | 4 | — | — | — | — | — |
| 2021–22 | University of Michigan | B1G | 34 | 6 | 9 | 15 | 41 | — | — | — | — | — |
| 2021–22 | Providence Bruins | AHL | 9 | 3 | 2 | 5 | 0 | 2 | 0 | 1 | 1 | 2 |
| 2022–23 | Providence Bruins | AHL | 61 | 9 | 14 | 23 | 38 | 4 | 0 | 0 | 0 | 0 |
| 2023–24 | Boston Bruins | NHL | 52 | 7 | 3 | 10 | 24 | 12 | 1 | 1 | 2 | 2 |
| 2023–24 | Providence Bruins | AHL | 17 | 4 | 4 | 8 | 2 | — | — | — | — | — |
| 2024–25 | Boston Bruins | NHL | 78 | 3 | 8 | 11 | 26 | — | — | — | — | — |
| 2025–26 | Boston Bruins | NHL | 6 | 1 | 0 | 1 | 0 | — | — | — | — | — |
| 2025–26 | Calgary Flames | NHL | 29 | 2 | 4 | 6 | 31 | — | — | — | — | — |
| NHL totals | | | 165 | 13 | 15 | 28 | 81 | 12 | 1 | 1 | 2 | 2 |

=== International ===
| Year | Team | Event | Result | GP | G | A | Pts | PIM |
|---|---|---|---|---|---|---|---|---|
| 2017 | United States | U17 | 1st place, gold medalist(s) | 6 | 1 | 0 | 1 | 4 |
| 2019 | United States | U18 | 3rd place, bronze medalist(s) | 7 | 3 | 1 | 4 | 8 |
| 2020 | United States | WJC | 6th | 5 | 0 | 0 | 0 | 2 |
| Junior totals | | | | 18 | 4 | 1 | 5 | 14 |

== Awards and honors ==
| Award | Year | Ref |
College
| All-Big Ten Freshman Team | 2020 | |

Awards and achievements
| Preceded by Urho Vaakanainen | Boston Bruins first-round draft pick 2019 | Succeeded by Fabian Lysell |
