= Mike Lee (ice hockey, born 1996) =

American ice hockey player

- Born: April 25, 1996 (age 29); Hamden, Connecticut, U.S.
- Height: 5 ft 11 in (180 cm)
- Weight: 183 lb (83 kg; 13 st 1 lb)
- Position: Defense
- Shoots: Left
- Slovak team Former teams: HC Nové Zámky; Indy Fuel; Kansas City Mavericks; Hartford Wolf Pack
- NHL draft: Undrafted
- Playing career: 2020–present

Michael Lee (born April 25, 1996) is an American professional ice hockey defenseman currently playing for HC Nové Zámky of the Slovak Extraliga.

He was an All-American for Sacred Heart.

== Playing career ==
After attending Hamden High school and the Gunnery Prep school, Lee finished High School in Penticton British Columbia while joining the Penticton Vees and helping the club win both the league championship and the Western Canada Cup in 2015. He was able to earn a college scholarship to Vermont on the back of his stellar season. After his sophomore year, Lee left Vermont and transferred to Sacred Heart, closer to his hometown.

Lee debuted for the Pioneers in 2018 and saw a tremendous increase to his production. His arrival in Bridgeport coincided with Sacred Heart winning 16 games and posting its best season in nine years. Lee performed even better in his senior season and was named an All-American as well as the best defenseman in Atlantic Hockey. The Pioneers finished the regular season with 21 wins, tying the program record. Before they could attempt to set a new benchmark, however, the Atlantic Hockey Tournament was cancelled due to the COVID-19 pandemic.

With his college career finished, Lee was able to sign a one-year contract with the Indy Fuel. While the season was shortened as a result of the pandemic, Lee played well and finished second on the team in terms of defensive points.

Entering the 2021–22 season, Lee returned with a second one-year deal. Having increased his offensive output, Lee was placed sixth in the ECHL in scoring from the blueline with 32 points through 41 games before he was traded by the Fuel to the Kansas City Mavericks on February 17, 2022.

== Career statistics ==
			Regular season					Playoffs
Season	Team	League	GP	G	A	Pts	PIM	GP	G	A	Pts	PIM
2012–13	The Gunnery	US-Prep	29	1	11	12	—	—	—	—	—	—
2013–14	The Gunnery	US-Prep	28	7	21	28	—	—	—	—	—	—
2013–14	Tri-City Storm	USHL	2	0	0	0	0	—	—	—	—	—
2014–15	Penticton Vees	BCHL	56	2	34	36	22	21	1	3	4	6
2015–16	U. of Vermont	HE	36	1	2	3	12	—	—	—	—	—
2016–17	U. of Vermont	HE	15	0	3	3	4	—	—	—	—	—
2018–19	Sacred Heart	AHA	35	4	15	19	27	—	—	—	—	—
2019–20	Sacred Heart	AHA	33	5	28	33	20	—	—	—	—	—
2020–21	Indy Fuel	ECHL	35	5	18	23	8	—	—	—	—	—
2021–22	Indy Fuel	ECHL	41	6	26	32	6	—	—	—	—	—
2021–22	Hartford Wolf Pack	AHL	3	0	0	0	2	—	—	—	—	—
2021–22	Kansas City Mavericks	ECHL	23	8	8	16	4	—	—	—	—	—
AHL totals			3	0	0	0	2	—	—	—	—	—

== Awards and honors ==
Award	Year
College
All-Atlantic Hockey First Team	2019–20
AHCA East Second Team All-American	2019–20

Awards and achievements
Preceded by Joseph Duszak	Atlantic Hockey Best Defenseman; 2019–20	Succeeded by Brennan Kapcheck/Nick Jenny
