= Ian Mitchell (ice hockey) =

Canadian ice hockey player (born 1999)

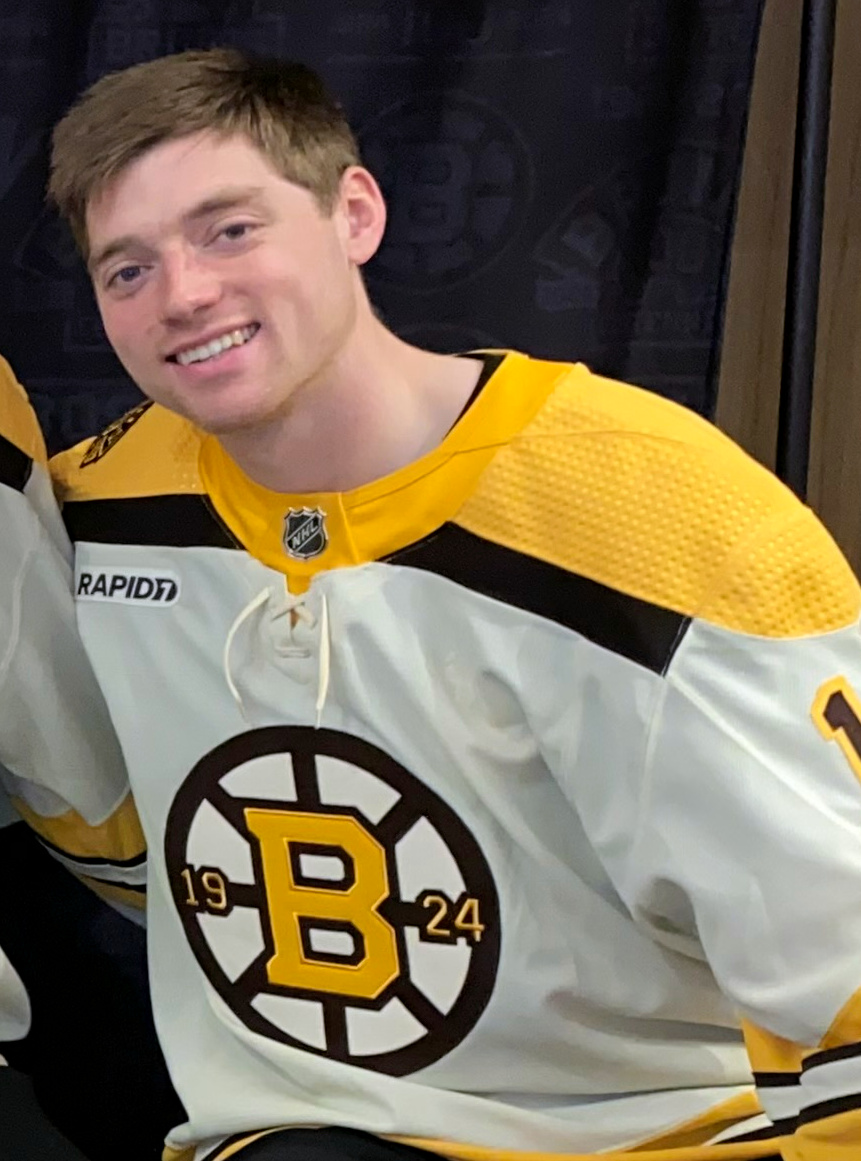
- Ian Mitchell with the Boston Bruins in 2023
- Born: January 18, 1999 (age 27) St. Albert, Alberta, Canada
- Height: 5 ft 11 in (180 cm)
- Weight: 198 lb (90 kg; 14 st 2 lb)
- Position: Defence
- Shoots: Right
- NL team Former teams: SC Bern; Chicago Blackhawks; Boston Bruins
- NHL draft: 57th overall, 2017; Chicago Blackhawks
- Playing career: 2021–present

Ian Mitchell (born January 18, 1999) is a Canadian professional ice hockey defenceman for SC Bern in the National League (NL).

== Playing career ==
=== Collegiate ===
Mitchell was selected 57th overall by the Chicago Blackhawks in the 2017 NHL entry draft, but committed to play college ice hockey at the University of Denver starting in the 2017–18 season. Mitchell immediately found success on Denver's blue line, scoring two goals and 28 assists in 41 games for the team. Denver won the 2018 NCHC Tournament, securing an automatic bid in the 2018 NCAA Division I men's ice hockey tournament. However, the Pioneers lost in the second round of the tournament to the Ohio State Buckeyes.

Mitchell was named an alternate captain for the 2018-19 season. He put together another good season, scoring six goals and 21 assists. Despite losing early in the 2019 NCHC Tournament, Mitchell and the Pioneers qualified for the 2019 NCAA tournament, where they put together a run to the Frozen Four before losing to the UMass Minutemen.

Mitchell considered going pro and signing with the Blackhawks prior to the 2019–20 season, but elected to stay with Denver, where he was named captain. He had his most successful collegiate season, scoring a career high 10 goals, as well as 22 assists for 32 points. For his efforts, he was named AHCA First-Team All-American. Denver was set to play the Omaha Mavericks in the 2020 NCHC Tournament, but the tournament was canceled before any games were played due to the COVID-19 pandemic. Similarly, the 2020 NCAA tournament was also cancelled.

=== Professional ===
==== Chicago Blackhawks ====
Mitchell decided to forgo his senior season at Denver, and signed an entry-level contract with the Blackhawks on April 11, 2020.

Mitchell made the Blackhawks' opening night roster to start his delayed rookie season. Mitchell logged his first NHL point on January 22, 2021 against the Detroit Red Wings with an assist on a goal by Calvin de Haan. He scored his first NHL goal on February 11, 2021 against the Columbus Blue Jackets. Although not a lineup regular, Mitchell stayed with the NHL club for the majority of his rookie season, finishing with three goals and four assists in 39 games.

In 2021–22 Mitchell did not find the same NHL success that he found in his rookie season, as he spent the majority of the year with the Blackhawks' AHL affiliate, the Rockford IceHogs. In the AHL, he scored 11 goals and 24 assists for 35 points in 57 games. He also played in five playoff games, registering a goal and assist before the IceHogs were eliminated in the second round by the Chicago Wolves. Mitchell played with the NHL club for eight games, registering a lone assist.

Although he started the 2022–23 season with the IceHogs again, Mitchell was called up on November 18, 2022. After that, he served as a reserve body for Chicago's defense, rotating in-and-out of the lineup as needed, but could not lock down a consistent spot in the everyday lineup. He scored a goal and added seven assists in 35 games with the Blackhawks.

==== Boston Bruins ====
On June 26, 2023, as an impending RFA, Mitchell was traded by the Blackhawks to the Boston Bruins with Alec Regula in exchange for Taylor Hall and Nick Foligno, reuniting him with his head coach from Denver, Jim Montgomery. Mitchell signed a one-year, two-way contract worth $775,000 with the Bruins on July 10, 2023, avoiding arbitration.

Mitchell won the seventh defensemen job out of training camp for the Bruins, and started the season on the NHL roster. Mitchell scored his first point as a Bruin with an assist on a goal by Matt Poitras against the Anaheim Ducks on October 22, 2023. Mitchell was placed on waivers on October 25, but cleared. Mitchell was quickly called back up a few days later, after playing a few games for the Bruins AHL affiliate, the Providence Bruins. However, on December 29, 2023, Mitchell was once again put on waivers, and once again cleared. Mitchell spent the rest of the regular season playing for Providence, helping them to a playoff berth in the 2024 Calder Cup playoffs. In the regular season for Providence, Mitchell provided solid offensive output, scoring six goals and 18 assists in 42 games. In the playoffs, this continued, as he scored two goals and two assists in four games in Providence's first round series against the Hartford Wolf Pack. Unfortunately, this was not enough to overcome the Wolf Pack, as the Bruins were eliminated in four games.

As a pending free agent, Mitchell opted to continue his tenure with the Bruins by signing a one-year, two-way contract extension on June 23, 2024. Mitchell started the season in Providence, and he spent most of his time there. He found solid success offensively, scoring four goals and 23 assists in 46 games. On February 28, 2025, Mitchell was called up to the NHL for the first time that season, hoping to provide an offensive spark on the blue line in lieu of injuries. Mitchell would stay with the NHL squad for the rest of the year, scoring a lone assist in 15 games.

==== Detroit Red Wings & Tampa Bay Lightning ====
On July 1, 2025, Mitchell signed as a free agent to a one-year, $775,000 contract with the Detroit Red Wings for the 2025–26 season. Assigned to their AHL affiliate, the Grand Rapids Griffins,Mitchell was able to consistent offensive success with them. In the final month of his time with Grand Rapids, Mitchell scored four assists in his last six games with the team, and seven assists in his last 13 games. On March 12, 2026, Mitchell was traded to the Tampa Bay Lightning, in exchange for Michael Milne and Wojciech Stachowiak. Mitchell reported to their AHL affiliate, the Syracuse Crunch.

==== SC Bern ====
At the conclusion of his contract with the Lightning, Mitchell left North America as a free agent to sign a two-year deal with Swiss club, SC Bern of the NL, on April 21, 2026.

== Career statistics ==
=== Regular season and playoffs ===
			Regular season					Playoffs
Season	Team	League	GP	G	A	Pts	PIM	GP	G	A	Pts	PIM
2014–15	Spruce Grove Saints	AJHL	2	0	0	0	0	—	—	—	—	—
2015–16	Spruce Grove Saints	AJHL	54	6	21	27	8	14	1	4	5	6
2016–17	Spruce Grove Saints	AJHL	53	8	29	37	34	10	1	2	3	0
2017–18	University of Denver	NCHC	41	2	28	30	14	—	—	—	—	—
2018–19	University of Denver	NCHC	39	6	21	27	18	—	—	—	—	—
2019–20	University of Denver	NCHC	36	10	22	32	16	—	—	—	—	—
2020–21	Chicago Blackhawks	NHL	39	3	4	7	14	—	—	—	—	—
2020–21	Rockford IceHogs	AHL	5	0	1	1	0	—	—	—	—	—
2021–22	Chicago Blackhawks	NHL	8	0	1	1	0	—	—	—	—	—
2021–22	Rockford IceHogs	AHL	57	11	24	35	19	5	1	1	2	0
2022–23	Chicago Blackhawks	NHL	35	1	7	8	8	—	—	—	—	—
2022–23	Rockford IceHogs	AHL	5	2	4	6	4	—	—	—	—	—
2023–24	Boston Bruins	NHL	13	0	2	2	10	—	—	—	—	—
2023–24	Providence Bruins	AHL	42	6	18	24	25	4	2	2	4	4
2024–25	Boston Bruins	NHL	15	0	1	1	2	—	—	—	—	—
2024–25	Providence Bruins	AHL	46	4	23	27	16	8	1	2	3	0
2025–26	Grand Rapids Griffins	AHL	45	4	16	20	10	—	—	—	—	—
2025–26	Syracuse Crunch	AHL	15	0	7	7	2	4	0	1	1	0
NHL totals			110	4	15	19	34	—	—	—	—	—

=== International ===
Year	Team	Event	Result	GP	G	A	Pts	PIM
2017	Canada	U18	5th	5	0	2	2	0
2019	Canada	WJC	6th	5	1	2	3	2
Junior totals				10	1	4	5	2

== Awards and honors ==
Award	Year	Ref
College
AHCA First Team All-American	2019–20	
