= Cole Hults =

American ice hockey player

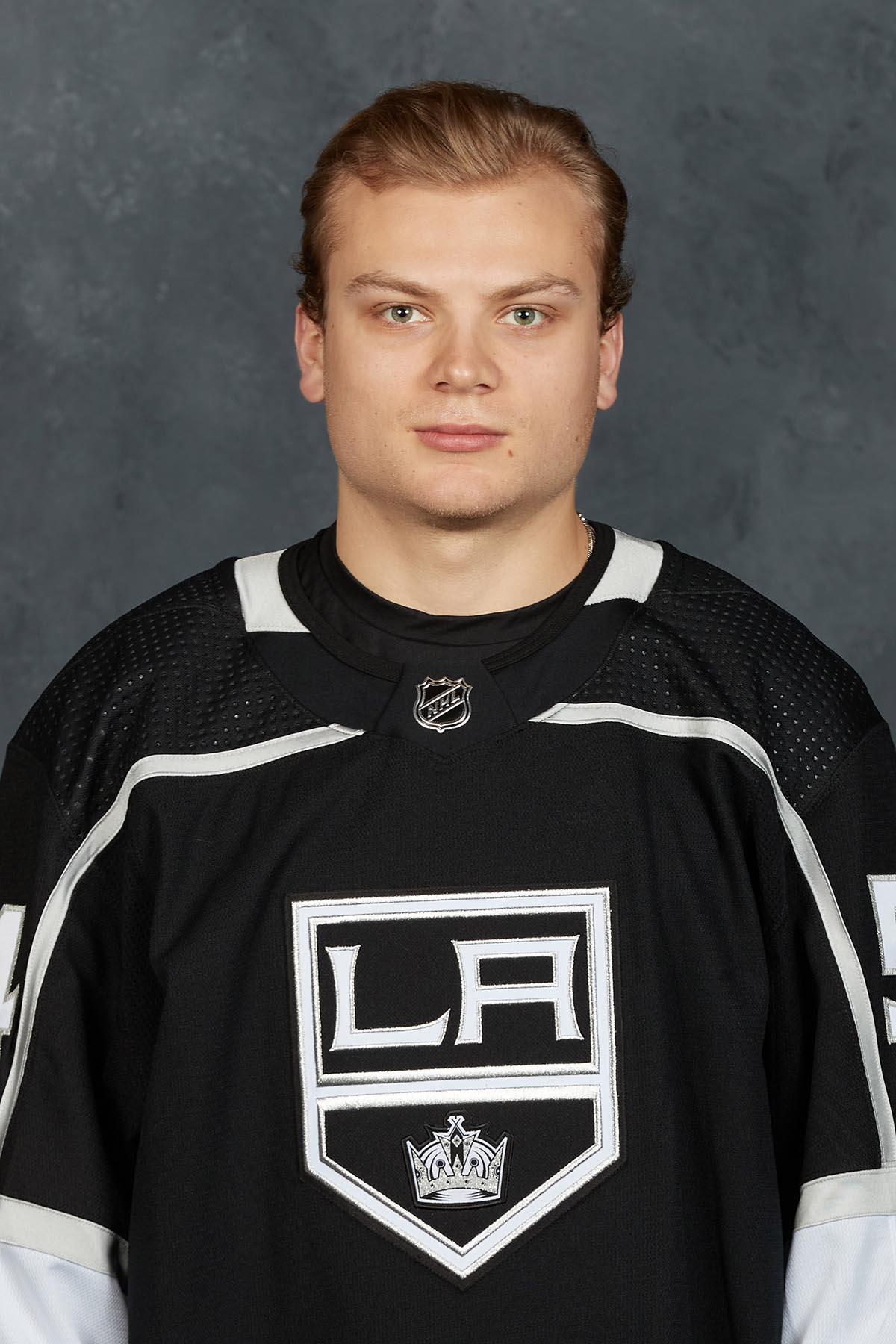
- Hults with the Los Angeles Kings in 2021
- Born: May 22, 1998 (age 28) Madison, Wisconsin, U.S.
- Height: 6 ft 0 in (183 cm)
- Weight: 190 lb (86 kg; 13 st 8 lb)
- Position: Defense
- Shoots: Left
- team Former teams: Free agent Ontario Reign; Tucson Roadrunners; HKM Zvolen; HC Bolzano
- NHL draft: 134th overall, 2017; Los Angeles Kings
- Playing career: 2021–present

Cole Bradley Hults (born May 22, 1998) is an American professional ice hockey player who is a free agent. He was selected by the Los Angeles Kings in the fifth round, 134th overall, of the 2017 NHL entry draft.

== Playing career ==
He played college hockey at Pennsylvania State University and was named to the Second All-AHCA Team after his junior season. Hults was selected 134th overall by the Los Angeles Kings in the 2017 NHL entry draft. On April 11, 2020, Hults signed a two-year, entry-level contract with the Kings, forgoing his senior season at Penn State.

In his first professional season, Hults was assigned by the Kings to AHL affiliate, the Ontario Reign, for the shortened 2020–21 season. He made 19 appearances on the blueline for the Reign, collecting 1 goal and 5 points.

On July 24, 2021, Hults was traded by the Kings, along with Bokondji Imama, to the Arizona Coyotes in exchange for Brayden Burke and Tyler Steenbergen.

Hults played one season within the Coyotes organization before leaving as a free agent to sign a one-year contract with Italian club, HC Bolzano of the ICEHL, on August 3, 2022. In signing with Bolzano, Hults joined his brother Mitch at the club.

== Career statistics ==
			Regular season					Playoffs
Season	Team	League	GP	G	A	Pts	PIM	GP	G	A	Pts	PIM
2014–15	Madison Capitols	USHL	9	0	2	2	29	—	—	—	—	—
2015–16	Madison Capitols	USHL	54	0	8	8	65	—	—	—	—	—
2016–17	Madison Capitols	USHL	59	6	26	32	112	—	—	—	—	—
2017–18	Penn State	B1G	38	3	17	20	43	—	—	—	—	—
2018–19	Penn State	B1G	39	6	22	28	24	—	—	—	—	—
2019–20	Penn State	B1G	34	8	22	30	18	—	—	—	—	—
2020–21	Ontario Reign	AHL	19	1	4	5	5	—	—	—	—	—
2021–22	Tucson Roadrunners	AHL	54	7	10	17	34	—	—	—	—	—
2022–23	HC Bolzano	ICEHL	45	3	26	29	33	19	2	4	6	16
2023–24	HKM Zvolen	Slovak	50	9	27	36	35	10	0	3	3	6
AHL totals			73	8	14	22	39	—	—	—	—	—

== Awards and honors ==
Award	Year	Ref
College
AHCA Second Team All-American	2020	
Big Ten Player of the Year	2020	
Big Ten Defensive Player of the Year	2020	
All-Big Ten First Team	2020	

Awards and achievements
Preceded by Taro Hirose	Big Ten Player of the Year; 2019–20	Succeeded by Cole Caufield
Preceded by Sasha Larocque	Big Ten Defensive Player of the Year; 2019–20	Succeeded by Cam York
