= 2019–20 Army Black Knights men's ice hockey season =

Sports season

- Conference: 4th Atlantic Hockey
- Home ice: Tate Rink

Rankings
- USCHO: NR
- USA Today: NR

Record
- Overall: 17–12–3
- Conference: 14–10–3–3
- Home: 8–5–2
- Road: 9–5–1
- Neutral: 0–2–0

Coaches and captains
- Head coach: Brian Riley
- Assistant coaches: Zach McKelvie; Dalton MacAfee; Ross Chicantek
- Captain: Zach Evancho
- Alternate captain(s): Alex Wilkinson; Dominic Franco

The 2019–20 Army Black Knights men's ice hockey season was the 117th season of play for the program, the 110th at the Division I level, and the 17th season in the Atlantic Hockey conference. The Black Knights represented the United States Military Academy and were coached by Brian Riley, in his 16th season.

== Departures ==
Player	Position	Nationality	Cause
Jared Dempsey	Goaltender	United States	Transferred to Michigan
Trevor Fidler	Forward	United States	Graduation (retired)
Tipper Higgins	Forward	United States	Graduation (retired)
Dalton MacAfee	Defenseman	United States	Graduation (retired)
Ian Mansfield	Forward	United States	Graduation (retired)
Taylor Maruya	Forward	United States	Graduation (retired)

== Recruiting ==
Player	Position	Nationality	Age	Notes
Brett Abdelnour	Forward	United States	20	Macomb, MI
Justin Evenson	Goaltender	United States	20	Minneapolis, MN
Thomas Farrell	Defenseman	United States	20	Mettawa, IL
Anthony Firriolo	Defenseman	United States	21	Towaco, NJ
Kendrick Frost	Forward	United States	20	Kansas City, MO
John Keranen	Forward	United States	21	Delano, MN
Patrick Smyth	Forward	United States	20	Toledo, OH
Noah Wilson	Defenseman	United States	20	Fond du Lac, WI

== Roster ==
As of July 1, 2019.

No.	Nat.	Player	Class	Pos	Height	Weight	DoB	Hometown	Previous team	NHL rights
1	(United States)	Matt Penta	Senior	G	6' 1" (1.85 m)	198 lb (90 kg)	1994-05-16	Waltham, Massachusetts	Kingston Voyageurs (OJHL)	—
2	(United States)	Thomas Farrell	Freshman	D	6' 1" (1.85 m)	200 lb (91 kg)	1999-01-18	Mettawa, Illinois	Youngstown Phantoms (USHL)	—
3	(United States)	Cody Fleckenstein	Junior	D	6' 0" (1.83 m)	180 lb (82 kg)	1997-03-31	Fredonia, New York	Corpus Christi IceRays (NAHL)	—
4	(United States)	Coby Mack	Sophomore	D	6' 3" (1.91 m)	213 lb (97 kg)	1997-10-07	Rapid City, South Dakota	Northern Cyclones (NCDC)	—
5	(United States)	Andrew Quetell	Sophomore	D	5' 11" (1.8 m)	185 lb (84 kg)	1998-06-21	Cleveland, Ohio	Johnstown Tomahawks (NAHL)	—
6	(United States)	Colin Bilek	Sophomore	F	5' 11" (1.8 m)	180 lb (82 kg)	1997-06-04	Brighton, Michigan	Northeast Generals (NAHL)	—
7	(United States)	Alex Wilkinson (A)	Senior	D	5' 10" (1.78 m)	186 lb (84 kg)	1995-04-10	Raleigh, North Carolina	Connecticut Oilers (EHL)	—
8	(United States)	Bryan Gerstenfeld	Senior	D	6' 1" (1.85 m)	204 lb (93 kg)	1995-07-23	Fairfield, Connecticut	Bonnyville Pontiacs (AJHL)	—
9	(United States)	Daniel Haider	Sophomore	F	5' 9" (1.75 m)	175 lb (79 kg)	1997-12-19	Anchorage, Alaska	Fairbanks Ice Dogs (NAHL)	—
10	(United States)	John Laurito	Junior	F	5' 9" (1.75 m)	170 lb (77 kg)	1996-04-19	Johnston, Rhode Island	Jersey Hitmen (USPHL)	—
11	(United States)	Dominic Franco (A)	Senior	F	6' 5" (1.96 m)	218 lb (99 kg)	1996-01-07	Portsmouth, Rhode Island	Langley Rivermen (BCHL)	—
12	(United States)	John Keranen	Freshman	F	6' 2" (1.88 m)	190 lb (86 kg)	1998-08-31	Delano, Minnesota	Minnesota Magicians (NAHL)	—
13	(United States)	Tucker DeYoung	Junior	F	6' 0" (1.83 m)	185 lb (84 kg)	1996-03-23	Lake Bluff, Illinois	Jersey Hitmen (USPHL)	—
14	(United States)	Brendan Soucie	Senior	F	5' 10" (1.78 m)	189 lb (86 kg)	1995-05-20	South Dennis, Massachusetts	Islanders Hockey Club (USPHL)	—
15	(United States)	Marshal Plunkett	Sophomore	D	5' 10" (1.78 m)	175 lb (79 kg)	1998-10-31	West Salem, Wisconsin	Coulee Region Chill (NAHL)	—
16	(United States)	Eric Butte	Sophomore	F	6' 1" (1.85 m)	175 lb (79 kg)	1997-05-28	Belmont, Massachusetts	Langley Rivermen (BCHL)	—
17	(United States)	Anthony Firriolo	Freshman	D	5' 11" (1.8 m)	165 lb (75 kg)	1998-07-03	Montville, New Jersey	Corpus Christi IceRays (NAHL)	—
18	(United States)	Zach Evancho (C)	Senior	F	5' 8" (1.73 m)	165 lb (75 kg)	1995-06-02	Buffalo, New York	Buffalo Jr. Sabres (OJHL)	—
19	(United States)	Brett Abdelnour	Freshman	F	5' 9" (1.75 m)	167 lb (76 kg)	1998-10-23	Macomb, Michigan	Amarillo Bulls (NAHL)	—
21	(United States)	John Zimmerman	Junior	D	5' 10" (1.78 m)	185 lb (84 kg)	1996-05-02	Arlington, Texas	Lone Star Brahmas (NAHL)	—
22	(United States)	Noah Wilson	Freshman	D	5' 11" (1.8 m)	195 lb (88 kg)	1998-12-21	Fond du Lac, Wisconsin	Fairbanks Ice Dogs (NAHL)	—
23	(United States)	Mason Krueger	Junior	F	5' 11" (1.8 m)	180 lb (82 kg)	1996-07-21	Bettendorf, Iowa	Corpus Christi IceRays (NAHL)	—
24	(United States)	Kevin Dineen	Junior	F	5' 11" (1.8 m)	175 lb (79 kg)	1996-04-02	Faribault, Minnesota	Coulee Region Chill (NAHL)	—
25	(United States)	Patrick Smyth	Freshman	F	6' 4" (1.93 m)	220 lb (100 kg)	1999-04-23	Toledo, Ohio	Dubuque Fighting Saints (USHL)	—
26	(United States)	Matt Berkovitz	Junior	D	6' 1" (1.85 m)	180 lb (82 kg)	1996-02-16	Green Bay, Wisconsin	Green Bay Gamblers (USHL)	ANA, 123rd overall 2014
27	(United States)	Michael Wilson	Senior	F	6' 0" (1.83 m)	195 lb (88 kg)	1995-06-06	Fond du Lac, Wisconsin	Minnesota Magicians (NAHL)	—
28	(United States)	Kendrick Frost	Freshman	F	6' 4" (1.93 m)	195 lb (88 kg)	1999-04-01	Lee's Summit, Missouri	Brookings Blizzard (NAHL)	—
33	(United States)	Trevin Kozlowski	Junior	G	6' 4" (1.93 m)	200 lb (91 kg)	1997-03-27	Valencia, California	Salmon Arm Silverbacks (BCHL)	—
34	(United States)	Justin Evenson	Freshman	G	6' 1" (1.85 m)	155 lb (70 kg)	1999-08-20	Minnetonka, Minnesota	Amarillo Bulls (NAHL)	—

== Standings ==
2019–20 Atlantic Hockey Standings
	Conference record								Overall record					
	GP	W	L	T	3/SW	PTS	GF	GA	GP	W	L	T	GF	GA
#20 American International	28	21	6	1	0	64	96	46	34	21	12	1	103	68
Sacred Heart	28	18	8	2	0	56	104	63	34	21	10	3	127	82
RIT	28	15	9	4	1	50	86	73	36	19	13	4	108	98
Army	28	14	11	3	3	48	70	64	33	17	13	3	82	76
Niagara	28	12	12	4	2	42	64	65	34	12	18	4	72	87
Air Force	28	10	12	6	5	41	60	67	34	10	18	6	70	95
Robert Morris	28	11	12	5	3	41	65	65	34	11	18	5	75	90
Bentley	28	13	13	2	0	41	75	80	34	15	16	3	83	94
Canisius	28	9	13	6	3	36	71	83	34	10	18	6	80	109
Holy Cross	28	9	16	3	2	32	67	83	34	10	19	5	80	99
Mercyhurst	28	3	23	2	0	11	49	118	34	5	27	2	64	141
Championship: March 20, 2020 † indicates conference regular season champion; * indicates conference tournament champion Rankings: USCHO.com Top 20 Poll; updated March 1, 2020

== Schedule and results ==
Date	Time	Opponent^{#}	Rank^{#}	Site	TV	Decision	Result	Attendance	Record
Regular season
October 6	4:05 PM	vs. Union*		Tate Rink • West Point, New York		Kozlowski	W 3–2	1,541	1–0–0
October 11	7:05 PM	at Connecticut*		XL Center • Hartford, Connecticut		Kozlowski	W 2–1	2,029	2–0–0
October 19	7:05 PM	vs. Robert Morris		Tate Rink • West Point, New York		Kozlowski	W 4–1	1,258	3–0–0 (1–0–0–0)
October 20	4:05 PM	vs. Robert Morris		Tate Rink • West Point, New York		Kozlowski	L 0–3	1,159	3–1–0 (1–1–0–0)
October 25	7:05 PM	at Bentley		Bentley Arena • Waltham, Massachusetts		Kozlowski	L 0–5	1,368	3–2–0 (1–2–0–0)
November 1	7:05 PM	vs. American International		Tate Rink • West Point, New York		Kozlowski	W 2–1	1,343	4–2–0 (2–2–0–0)
November 2	1:05 PM	at American International		MassMutual Center • Springfield, Massachusetts		Kozlowski	L 1–4	1,484	4–3–0 (2–3–0–0)
November 15	7:05 PM	at Holy Cross		Hart Center • Worcester, Massachusetts		Kozlowski	W 4–1	600	5–3–0 (3–3–0–0)
November 16	5:05 PM	at Holy Cross		Hart Center • Worcester, Massachusetts		Kozlowski	W 3–1	755	6–3–0 (4–3–0–0)
November 22	7:05 PM	vs. RIT		Tate Rink • West Point, New York		Kozlowski	W 2–1	1,458	7–3–0 (5–3–0–0)
November 23	4:05 PM	vs. RIT		Tate Rink • West Point, New York		Kozlowski	L 2–4	2,030	7–4–0 (5–4–0–0)
November 26	7:05 PM	at American International		MassMutual Center • Springfield, Massachusetts		Kozlowski	W 4–1	567	8–4–0 (6–4–0–0)
November 29	1:05 PM	at Canisius		LECOM Harborcenter • Buffalo, New York		Kozlowski	W 4–3	819	9–4–0 (7–4–0–0)
November 30	1:05 PM	at Canisius		LECOM Harborcenter • Buffalo, New York		Kozlowski	W 3–2	907	10–4–0 (8–4–0–0)
December 6	7:05 PM	vs. Bentley		Tate Rink • West Point, New York		Kozlowski	W 4–3	1,419	11–4–0 (9–4–0–0)
December 7	7:05 PM	vs. Bentley		Tate Rink • West Point, New York		Kozlowski	L 2–4	1,872	11–5–0 (9–5–0–0)
December 14	5:05 PM	at Robert Morris		Colonials Arena • Neville Township, Pennsylvania		Kozlowski	W 4–0	429	12–5–0 (10–5–0–0)
December 15	1:05 PM	at Robert Morris		Colonials Arena • Neville Township, Pennsylvania		Kozlowski	T 1–1 ^{SOW}	376	12–5–1 (10–5–1–1)
December 29	4:05 PM	vs. New Hampshire*		Tate Rink • West Point, New York		Kozlowski	W 5–4	2,614	13–5–1 (10–5–1–1)
Fortress Invitational
January 3	8:00 PM	vs. #14 Providence*	#20	T-Mobile Arena • Paradise, Nevada (Fortress Invitational Semifinal)		Kozlowski	L 1–3	3,735	13–6–1 (10–5–1–1)
January 5	12:05 AM	vs. #6 Ohio State*	#20	T-Mobile Arena • Paradise, Nevada (Fortress Invitational Third Place)		Kozlowski	L 1–2 ^{OT}	4,769	13–7–1 (10–5–1–1)
January 10	7:05 PM	vs. Air Force		Tate Rink • West Point, New York		Kozlowski	T 3–3 ^{SOW}	2,658	13–7–2 (10–5–2–2)
January 11	7:05 PM	vs. Air Force		Tate Rink • West Point, New York		Kozlowski	W 5–2	2,668	14–7–2 (11–5–2–2)
January 18	7:30 PM	at Royal Military College*		Leon's Centre • Kingston, Ontario (Exhibition)			L 2–3 ^{OT}		
January 24	7:05 PM	at Niagara		Dwyer Arena • Lewiston, New York		Kozlowski	L 1–4	751	14–8–2 (11–6–2–2)
January 25	4:05 PM	at Niagara		Dwyer Arena • Lewiston, New York		Kozlowski	L 2–3 ^{OT}	832	14–9–2 (11–7–2–2)
January 31	7:05 PM	vs. Canisius		Tate Rink • West Point, New York		Kozlowski	L 2–3 ^{OT}	1,672	14–10–2 (11–8–2–2)
February 1	4:05 PM	vs. Canisius		Tate Rink • West Point, New York		Kozlowski	W 4–2	2,116	15–10–2 (12–8–2–2)
February 7	7:05 PM	at Bentley		Bentley Arena • Waltham, Massachusetts		Penta	L 1–4	1,239	15–11–2 (12–9–2–2)
February 14	7:05 PM	at Mercyhurst		Mercyhurst Ice Center • Erie, Pennsylvania		Kozlowski	W 5–1	789	16–11–2 (13–9–2–2)
February 15	7:05 PM	at Mercyhurst		Mercyhurst Ice Center • Erie, Pennsylvania		Kozlowski	W 4–1	957	17–11–2 (14–9–2–2)
February 21	7:05 PM	vs. Sacred Heart		Tate Rink • West Point, New York		Kozlowski	L 0–3	1,718	17–12–2 (14–10–2–2)
February 22	7:05 PM	vs. Sacred Heart		Tate Rink • West Point, New York		Kozlowski	T 3–3 ^{SOW}	2,207	17–12–3 (14–10–3–3)
February 29	7:05 PM	vs. American International		Tate Rink • West Point, New York		Penta	L 1–4	2,242	17–13–3 (14–11–3–3)
Atlantic Hockey Tournament
Tournament Cancelled
*Non-conference game. ^{#}Rankings from USCHO.com Poll. All times are in Eastern Time.

== Scoring Statistics ==
Name	Position	Games	Goals	Assists	Points	PIM
Dominic Franco	RW	33	10	13	23	40
Michael Wilson	F	27	11	9	20	30
Colin Bilek	RW	33	7	13	20	33
John Zimmerman	D	32	2	17	19	58
Mason Krueger	F	30	9	9	18	31
Eric Butte	F	33	8	7	15	19
Zach Evancho	W	22	6	9	15	24
John Keranen	F	33	2	12	14	12
Alex Wilkinson	D	33	4	9	13	0
Anthony Firriolo	D	30	3	9	12	10
Brett Abdelnour	F	32	7	3	10	12
Thomas Farrell	D	32	1	9	10	8
Daniel Haider	F	33	3	6	9	4
Cody Fleckenstein	D	33	1	6	7	16
Brendan Soucie	F	10	3	2	5	0
Matt Berkovitz	D	27	1	4	5	6
Marshal Plunkett	D	17	0	3	3	0
Patrick Smyth	F	28	2	0	2	6
Tucker DeYoung	F	16	1	1	2	2
Kevin Dineen	F	16	1	1	2	6
Kendrick Frost	LW	19	0	2	2	4
John Laurito	F	23	1	0	1	12
Andrew Quetell	D	9	0	1	1	2
Noah Wilson	D	25	0	1	1	8
Bryan Gerstenfeld	D	1	0	0	0	0
Matt Penta	G	3	0	0	0	0
Trevin Kozlowski	G	31	0	0	0	0
Bench	-	-	-	-	-	-
Total			83	146	229	343

== Goaltending statistics ==
Name	Games	Minutes	Wins	Losses	Ties	Goals against	Saves	Shut outs	SV %	GAA
Trevin Kozlowski	31	1853	17	11	3	68	681	1	.909	2.20
Matt Penta	3	133	0	2	0	8	62	0	.886	3.60
Empty Net	-	18	-	-	-	4	-	-	-	-
Total	33	2005	17	13	3	80	743	1	.903	2.39

== Rankings ==
Poll	Week																							
Poll	Pre	1	2	3	4	5	6	7	8	9	10	11	12	13	14	15	16	17	18	19	20	21	22	23 (Final)
USCHO.com	NR	NR	NR	NR	NR	NR	NR	NR	NR	NR	NR	NR	20	NR	NR	NR	NR	NR	NR	NR	NR	NR	NR	NR
USA Today	NR	NR	NR	NR	NR	NR	NR	NR	NR	NR	NR	NR	NR	NR	NR	NR	NR	NR	NR	NR	NR	NR	NR	NR
