= 2019–20 NCAA Division I men's ice hockey season =

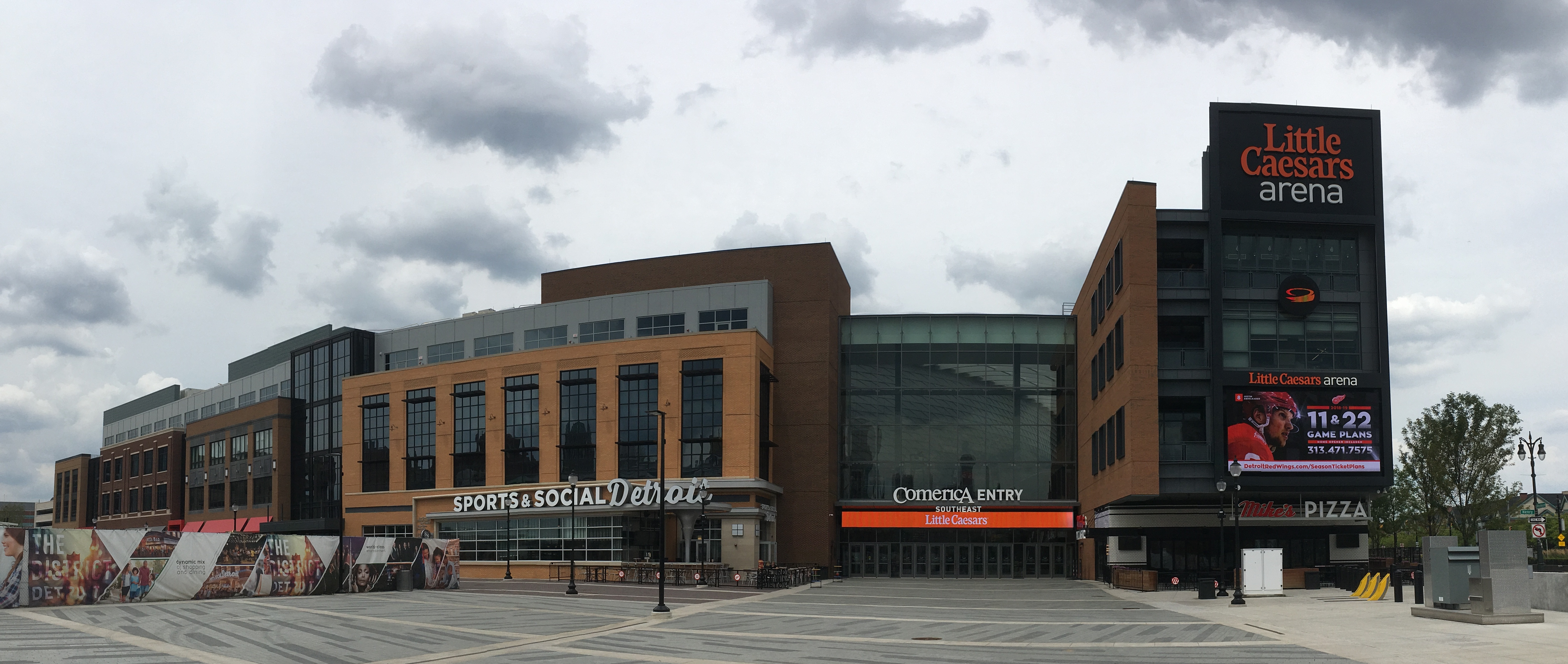
- Little Caesars Arena in Detroit, Michigan was the scheduled host of the 2020 Frozen Four.
- Duration: October 5, 2019– April 11, 2020
- NCAA tournament: 2020
- National championship: Little Caesars Arena; Detroit, Michigan
- Hobey Baker Award: Scott Perunovich (Minnesota–Duluth)

The 2019–20 NCAA Division I men's ice hockey season began on October 5, 2019, and was intended to conclude with the Frozen Four in April 2020. This would have been the 73rd season in which an NCAA ice hockey championship was held, and was US college hockey's 126th year overall. However, the postseason tournament was cancelled due to the COVID-19 pandemic.

In February, seven members that had previously announced their withdrawal from the WCHA following the 2020–21 season announced that they were reforming the Central Collegiate Hockey Association, and that the new conference would begin play with the 2021–22 season.

Due to the COVID-19 pandemic, the NCAA, along with several conferences, decided to ban spectators from attending many of the games played after March 10, 2020, including the 2020 Frozen Four. Additionally, due to the threat of infection, Harvard and Yale withdrew from their conference tournament on March 11, effectively ending their seasons. On March 12, the NCAA canceled the tournament outright, along with all other winter and spring championships.

== Regular season ==
=== Season tournaments ===
Tournament	Dates	Teams	Champion
IceBreaker Invitational	October 11–12	4	Ohio State
Friendship Four	November 29–30	4	Northeastern
Ledyard Bank Classic	December 28–29	4	Dartmouth
Mariucci Classic	December 28–29	4	Minnesota
Catamount Cup	December 28–29	4	Vermont
Great Lakes Invitational	December 30–31	4	Michigan Tech
Fortress Invitational	January 3–4	4	Providence
Connecticut Ice	January 25–26	4	Sacred Heart
Beanpot	February 3, 10	4	Northeastern

=== Standings ===
- 2019–20 Atlantic Hockey Standings
  	Conference record								Overall record					
  	GP	W	L	T	3/SW	PTS	GF	GA	GP	W	L	T	GF	GA
  #20 American International	28	21	6	1	0	64	96	46	34	21	12	1	103	68
  Sacred Heart	28	18	8	2	0	56	104	63	34	21	10	3	127	82
  RIT	28	15	9	4	1	50	86	73	36	19	13	4	108	98
  Army	28	14	11	3	3	48	70	64	33	17	13	3	82	76
  Niagara	28	12	12	4	2	42	64	65	34	12	18	4	72	87
  Air Force	28	10	12	6	5	41	60	67	34	10	18	6	70	95
  Robert Morris	28	11	12	5	3	41	65	65	34	11	18	5	75	90
  Bentley	28	13	13	2	0	41	75	80	34	15	16	3	83	94
  Canisius	28	9	13	6	3	36	71	83	34	10	18	6	80	109
  Holy Cross	28	9	16	3	2	32	67	83	34	10	19	5	80	99
  Mercyhurst	28	3	23	2	0	11	49	118	34	5	27	2	64	141
  Championship: March 20, 2020 † indicates conference regular season champion; * indicates conference tournament champion Rankings: USCHO.com Top 20 Poll; updated March 1, 2020
- 2019–20 Big Ten ice hockey Standings
  	Conference record								Overall record					
  	GP	W	L	T	3/SW	PTS	GF	GA	GP	W	L	T	GF	GA
  #9 Penn State	24	12	8	4	1	41	79	70	34	20	10	4	121	88
  #10 Ohio State	24	11	9	4	1	38	62	62	34	18	11	5	91	80
  #17 Michigan	24	11	10	3	2	38	65	52	34	16	14	4	92	72
  #18 Minnesota	24	9	8	7	4	38	66	62	34	14	13	7	95	94
  Notre Dame	24	9	9	6	4	37	59	59	34	14	13	7	90	91
  Michigan State	24	11	11	2	0	35	54	54	34	15	17	2	80	82
  Wisconsin	24	7	15	2	2	25	63	89	34	14	18	2	110	124
  Championship: March 21, 2020 † indicates conference regular season champion * indicates conference tournament champion Rankings: USCHO.com Top 20 Poll; updated March 1, 2020
- 2019–20 NCAA Division I Independent ice hockey standings
  	Overall record					
  	GP	W	L	T	GF	GA
  #14 Arizona State	36	22	11	3	121	97
  Rankings: USCHO.com Top 20 Poll; updated March 1, 2020
- 2019–20 ECAC Hockey Standings
  	Conference record							Overall record					
  	GP	W	L	T	PTS	GF	GA	GP	W	L	T	GF	GA
  #1 Cornell †	22	18	2	2	38	81	34	29	23	2	4	104	45
  #7 Clarkson	22	16	5	1	33	63	38	34	23	8	3	96	63
  #14 Quinnipiac	22	14	6	2	30	64	45	34	21	11	2	94	78
  Rensselaer	22	13	8	1	27	63	41	34	17	15	2	95	87
  Harvard	22	11	6	5	27	82	59	31	15	10	6	116	87
  Dartmouth	22	10	10	2	22	60	73	31	13	14	4	93	106
  Yale	22	10	10	2	22	57	64	32	15	15	2	77	97
  Colgate	22	8	9	5	21	50	54	36	12	16	8	76	87
  Brown	22	8	12	2	18	41	54	31	8	21	2	52	84
  Union	22	5	15	2	12	46	71	37	8	25	4	67	112
  Princeton	22	2	16	4	8	46	71	31	6	20	5	66	100
  St. Lawrence	22	2	18	2	6	37	81	36	4	27	5	64	130
  Championship: March 21, 2020 † indicates conference regular season champion (Cleary Cup) * indicates conference tournament champion (Whitelaw Cup); Rankings: USCHO.com Top 20 Poll; updated March 23, 2020
- 2019–20 Hockey East Standings
  	Conference record							Overall record					
  	GP	W	L	T	PTS	GF	GA	GP	W	L	T	GF	GA
  #5 Boston College †	24	17	6	1	35	93	48	34	24	8	2	136	71
  #9 Massachusetts	24	14	8	2	30	69	49	34	21	11	2	107	67
  #12 Massachusetts–Lowell	24	12	7	5	29	60	60	34	18	10	6	90	79
  #15 Maine	24	12	9	3	27	56	56	34	18	11	5	89	75
  Connecticut	24	12	10	2	26	71	75	34	15	15	4	102	106
  Boston University	24	10	9	5	25	69	64	34	13	13	8	103	98
  #19 Northeastern	24	11	12	1	23	66	71	34	18	13	3	98	92
  Providence	24	10	11	3	23	70	63	34	16	12	6	102	78
  New Hampshire	24	9	12	3	21	54	69	34	15	15	4	91	97
  Merrimack	24	7	14	3	17	63	77	34	9	22	3	85	123
  Vermont	24	2	18	4	8	44	83	34	5	23	6	59	100
  Championship: March 21, 2020 † indicates conference regular season champion * indicates conference tournament champion (Lamoriello Trophy); Rankings: USCHO.com Top 20 Poll
- 2019–20 National Collegiate Hockey Conference Standings
  	Conference record								Overall record					
  	GP	W	L	T	3/SW	PTS	GF	GA	GP	W	L	T	GF	GA
  #3 North Dakota †	24	17	4	3	2	56	86	49	35	26	5	4	135	68
  #5 Minnesota–Duluth	24	17	5	2	0	53	89	53	34	22	10	2	114	77
  #6 Denver	24	11	8	5	4	42	67	54	36	21	9	6	118	81
  #16 Western Michigan	24	12	9	3	2	41	84	73	36	18	13	5	125	101
  St. Cloud State	24	10	12	2	1	33	61	74	34	13	15	6	94	108
  Omaha	24	8	13	3	0	27	63	75	36	14	17	5	108	107
  Miami	24	5	16	3	2	20	61	89	34	8	21	5	92	127
  Colorado College	24	4	17	3	1	16	48	96	34	11	20	3	86	123
  Championship: Cancelled † indicates conference regular season champion; * indicates conference tournament champion Rankings: USCHO.com Top 20 Poll
- 2019–20 Western Collegiate Hockey Association Standings
  	Conference record								Overall record					
  	GP	W	L	T	3/SW	PTS	GF	GA	GP	W	L	T	GF	GA
  #2 Minnesota State	28	23	4	1	1	71	115	38	36	29	5	2	141	53
  #11 Bemidji State	28	20	5	3	2	65	101	46	34	20	9	5	111	65
  Northern Michigan	28	16	11	1	1	50	92	87	36	18	14	4	115	112
  Alaska	28	14	9	5	2	49	73	65	34	16	13	5	84	86
  Bowling Green	28	14	10	4	3	49	85	70	36	19	13	4	112	92
  Michigan Tech	28	14	12	2	0	44	68	65	37	19	15	3	96	85
  Lake Superior State	28	11	13	4	4	41	66	77	38	13	21	4	90	112
  Alaska Anchorage	28	4	18	6	3	21	56	96	34	4	23	7	66	122
  Ferris State	28	5	21	2	0	17	54	100	35	7	26	2	70	127
  Alabama–Huntsville	28	2	20	6	1	13	50	116	34	2	26	6	57	145
  Championship: March 21, 2020 † indicates conference regular season champion; * indicates conference tournament champion Rankings: USCHO.com Top 20 Poll; updated March 1, 2020

== PairWise Rankings ==
The PairWise Rankings (PWR) are a statistical tool designed to approximate the process by which the NCAA selection committee decides which teams get at-large bids to the 16-team NCAA tournament. Although the NCAA selection committee does not use the PWR as presented by USCHO, the PWR has been accurate in predicting which teams will make the tournament field.

For Division I men, all teams are included in comparisons starting in the 2013–14 season (formerly, only teams with a Ratings Percentage Index of .500 or above, or teams under consideration, were included). The PWR method compares each team with every other such team, with the winner of each “comparison” earning one PWR point. After all comparisons are made, the points are totaled up and rankings listed accordingly.

With 60 Division I men's teams, the greatest number of PWR points any team could earn is 59, winning the comparison with every other team. Meanwhile, a team that lost all of its comparisons would have no PWR points.

Teams are then ranked by PWR point total, with ties broken by the teams' RPI ratings, which starting in 2013-14 is weighted for home and road games and includes a quality wins bonus (QWB) for beating teams in the top 20 of the RPI (it also is weighted for home and road).

When it comes to comparing teams, the PWR uses three criteria which are combined to make a comparison: RPI, record against common opponents and head-to-head competition. Starting in 2013–14, the comparison of record against teams under consideration was dropped because all teams are now under comparison.

NCAA Division I Men's Hockey Final PairWise Rankings
Rank	Team	PWR	RPI	Conference
1	North Dakota	59	.6220*	NCHC
2	Minnesota State	58	.6012*	WCHA
3	Cornell	57	.5958*	ECAC Hockey
4	Boston College	55	.5785	Hockey East
4	Minnesota–Duluth	55	.5744	NCHC
4	Denver	55	.5704	NCHC
7	Penn State	53	.5560	Big Ten
8	Massachusetts	52	.5520	Hockey East
9	Clarkson	51	.5490*	ECAC Hockey
10	Bemidji State	49	.5449	WCHA
10	Ohio State	49	.5422*	Big Ten
12	Arizona State	48	.5398*	Independent
13	Massachusetts–Lowell	47	.5388	Hockey East
14	Quinnipiac	46	.5356	ECAC Hockey
15	Maine	45	.5325	Hockey East
15	Minnesota	45	.5317	Big Ten
17	Northeastern	42	.5313	Hockey East
17	Michigan	42	.5313	Big Ten
19	Western Michigan	40	.5309	NCHC
19	Notre Dame	40	.5289	Big Ten
21	Providence	39	.5271	Hockey East
22	St. Cloud State	38	.5241	NCHC
23	Sacred Heart	37	.5198	Atlantic Hockey
24	Bowling Green	36	.5172	WCHA
25	Michigan State	35	.5194	Big Ten
26	Northern Michigan	34	.5164	WCHA
27	American International	33	.5161	Atlantic Hockey
28	Wisconsin	32	.5148	Big Ten
29	Harvard	31	.5139	ECAC Hockey
30	Boston University	29	.5109	Hockey East
31	New Hampshire	28	.5118	Hockey East
31	Connecticut	28	.5106	Hockey East
33	Alaska	27	.5101	WCHA
33	Michigan Tech	27	.5101	WCHA
35	Omaha	24	.5060	NCHC
35	Rensselaer	24	.5019	ECAC Hockey
37	RIT	23	.5010	Atlantic Hockey
37	Army	23	.4911	Atlantic Hockey
39	Dartmouth	21	.4910	ECAC Hockey
39	Yale	21	.4892	ECAC Hockey
41	Colorado College	19	.4784	NCHC
41	Miami	19	.4727	NCHC
43	Colgate	16	.4721	ECAC Hockey
43	Lake Superior State	16	.4679	WCHA
45	Merrimack	15	.4661	Hockey East
46	Bentley	14	.4644	Atlantic Hockey
46	Niagara	14	.4537	Atlantic Hockey
48	Robert Morris	12	.4529	Atlantic Hockey
48	Air Force	12	.4514	Atlantic Hockey
50	Canisius	10	.4492	Atlantic Hockey
51	Holy Cross	9	.4476	Atlantic Hockey
52	Brown	8	.4459	ECAC Hockey
53	Vermont	7	.4446	Hockey East
54	Union	6	.4327	ECAC Hockey
54	Ferris State	6	.4293	WCHA
56	Alaska Anchorage	4	.4198	WCHA
57	Princeton	3	.4182	ECAC Hockey
58	Alabama–Huntsville	2	.4118	WCHA
59	St. Lawrence	1	.4077	ECAC Hockey
60	Mercyhurst	0	.3944	Atlantic Hockey
*A team's RPI has been adjusted to remove negative effect from defeating a weak opponent Note: A team's record is based only on games against other Division I hockey schools which are eligible for the NCAA Tournament; PairWise Rankings were last updated March 1, 2020

== Player stats ==
=== Scoring leaders ===
Updated as of games played on March 8, 2020.

GP = Games played; G = Goals; A = Assists; Pts = Points; PIM = Penalty minutes

Player	Class	Team	GP	G	A	Pts	PIM
Jack Dugan	Sophomore	Providence	34	10	42	52	64
Jordan Kawaguchi	Junior	North Dakota	33	15	30	45	8
Marc Michaelis	Senior	Minnesota State	31	20	24	44	8
Tyce Thompson	Sophomore	Providence	34	19	25	44	29
Nick Abruzzese	Freshman	Harvard	31	14	29	43	4
David Farrance	Junior	Boston University	34	14	29	43	20
Alex Newhook	Freshman	Boston College	34	19	23	42	10
Mitchell Fossier	Senior	Maine	34	10	32	42	12
Julius Mattila	Senior	Boston College	34	10	32	42	10
James Sanchez	Junior	Arizona State	36	10	30	40	24

=== Leading goaltenders ===
The following goaltenders lead the NCAA in goals against average, minimum 1/3 of team's minutes played.
GP = Games played; Min = Minutes played; W = Wins; L = Losses; T = Ties; GA = Goals against; SO = Shutouts; SV% = Save percentage; GAA = Goals against average

Player	Class	Team	GP	Min	W	L	T	GA	SO	SV%	GAA
Dryden McKay	Sophomore	Minnesota State	37	2156:25	30	4	2	47	10	.942	1.31
Matthew Galajda	Junior	Cornell	29	1733:36	23	2	4	45	5	.931	1.56
Zach Driscoll	Sophomore	Bemidji State	33	1989:15	21	8	4	54	4	.937	1.63
Frank Marotte	Senior	Clarkson	34	2019:49	23	8	3	60	4	.938	1.78
Zackarias Skog	Senior	American International	19	1049:01	10	8	1	32	4	.926	1.83
Strauss Mann	Sophomore	Michigan	35	2071:55	18	13	4	64	6	.939	1.85
Matt Murray	Junior	Massachusetts	20	1094:19	13	6	0	34	3	.919	1.86
Filip Lindberg	Sophomore	Massachusetts	18	943:58	8	5	2	30	2	.927	1.91
Spencer Knight	Freshman	Boston College	33	1979:12	23	8	2	65	5	.931	1.97
Keith Petruzzelli	Junior	Quinnipiac	34	1967:57	21	10	2	66	3	.920	2.01

== Awards ==
=== NCAA ===
Award		Recipient
Hobey Baker Award		Scott Perunovich, Minnesota–Duluth
Spencer Penrose Award		Brad Berry, North Dakota; Mike Schafer, Cornell
Tim Taylor Award		Alex Newhook, Boston College
Mike Richter Award		Jeremy Swayman, Maine
Derek Hines Unsung Hero Award		Jared Pike, American International
Lowes' Senior CLASS Award		Nolan Nicholas, Alaska Anchorage
Tournament Most Outstanding Player		Not awarded due to the COVID-19 pandemic
AHCA All-American Teams
East First Team	Position	West First Team
Jeremy Swayman, Maine	G	Dryden McKay, Minnesota State
David Farrance, Boston University	D	Ian Mitchell, Denver
Jack Rathbone, Harvard	D	Scott Perunovich, Minnesota–Duluth
Morgan Barron, Cornell	F	Jordan Kawaguchi, North Dakota
Jack Dugan, Providence	F	Hugh McGing, Western Michigan
John Leonard, Massachusetts	F	Marc Michaelis, Minnesota State
East Second Team	Position	West Second Team
Frank Marotte, Clarkson	G	Hunter Shepard, Minnesota–Duluth
Yanni Kaldis, Cornell	D	Cole Hults, Penn State
Mike Lee, Sacred Heart	D	Connor Mackey, Minnesota State
	D	Alec Rauhauser, Bowling Green
Nick Abruzzese, Harvard	F	Noah Cates, Minnesota–Duluth
Jason Cotton, Sacred Heart	F	Cole Koepke, Minnesota–Duluth
Tyler Madden, Northeastern	F	Nate Sucese, Penn State

=== Atlantic Hockey ===
Award		Recipient
Player of the Year		Jason Cotton, Sacred Heart
Rookie of the Year		Braeden Tuck, Sacred Heart
Best Defensive Forward		Brady Tomlak, Air Force
Best Defenseman		Mike Lee, Sacred Heart
Individual Sportsmanship Award		Alex Wilkinson, Army
Regular Season Scoring Trophy		Austin McIlmurray, Sacred Heart
Regular Season Goaltending Award		Zackarias Skog, American International
Coach of the Year		Eric Lang, American International
Tournament MVP		Not awarded due to the COVID-19 pandemic
All-Atlantic Hockey Teams
First Team	Position	Second Team
Zackarias Skog, American International	G	Justin Kapelmaster, Robert Morris
Mike Lee, Sacred Heart	D	Adam Brubacher, RIT
Brennan Kapcheck, American International	D	Patrik Demel, American International
Blake Christensen, American International	F	Dominic Franco, Army
Jason Cotton, Sacred Heart	F	Matt Hoover, Cansius
Austin McIlmurray, Sacred Heart	F	Nick Hutchison, Cansius
Jakov Novak, Bentley	F	–
Third Team	Position	Rookie Team
Josh Benson, Sacred Heart	G	Chad Veltri, Niagara
Logan Drackett, RIT	G	–
Brandon Koch, Air Force	D	Anthony Firriolo, Army
Matt Stief, Cansius	D	Brandon Koch, Air Force
Jack Billings, Niagara	F	Elijiah Gonsalves, RIT
Martin Mellberg, American International	F	Matt Gosiewski, Bentley
Hugo Reinhardt, American International	F	Braeden Tuck, Sacred Heart

=== Big Ten ===
Award		Recipient
Player of the Year		Cole Hults, Penn State
Defensive Player of the Year		Cole Hults, Penn State
Goaltender of the Year		Strauss Mann, Michigan
Freshman of the Year		Cole Caufield, Wisconsin
Scoring Champion		Cole Caufield, Wisconsin
Coach of the Year		Bob Motzko, Minnesota
Tournament Most Outstanding Player		Not awarded due to the COVID-19 pandemic
All-Big Ten Teams
First Team	Position	Second Team
Strauss Mann, Michigan	G	John Lethemon, Michigan State
Wyatt Kalynuk, Wisconsin	D	Jerad Rosburg, Michigan State
Cole Hults, Penn State	D	Dennis Cesana, Michigan State
Cole Caufield, Wisconsin	F	Evan Barratt, Penn State
Nate Sucese, Penn State	F	Tanner Laczynski, Ohio State
Patrick Khodorenko, Michigan State	F	Jake Slaker, Michigan
Freshman Team	Position	–
Jared Moe, Minnesota	G	–
Jackson LaCombe, Minnesota	D	–
Cam York, Michigan	D	–
John Beecher, Michigan	F	–
Cole Caufield, Wisconsin	F	–
Ben Meyers, Minnesota	F	–

=== ECAC ===
Award		Recipient
Player of the Year		Morgan Barron, Cornell
Best Defensive Forward		Josh Dunne, Clarkson
Best Defensive Defenseman		Alex Green, Cornell
Rookie of the Year		Nick Abruzzese, Harvard
Ken Dryden Award		Frank Marotte, Clarkson
Student-Athlete of the Year		Zach Tsekos, Clarkson
Tim Taylor Award		Mike Schafer, Cornell
Most Outstanding Player in Tournament		Not awarded due to the COVID-19 pandemic
All-ECAC Hockey Teams
First Team	Position	Second Team
Frank Marotte, Clarkson	G	Owen Savory, Rensselaer
Yanni Kaldis, Cornell	D	Connor McCarthy, Clarkson
Jack Rathbone, Harvard	D	Will Reilly, Rensselaer
Nick Abruzzese, Harvard	F	Jack Drury, Harvard
Morgan Barron, Cornell	F	Curtis Hall, Yale
Drew O'Connor, Dartmouth	F	Odeen Tufto, Quinnipiac
Third Team	Position	Rookie Team
Matthew Galajda, Cornell	G	Mitchell Gibson, Harvard
Peter Diliberatore, Quinnipiac	D	Dylan Anhorn, Union
Alex Green, Cornell	D	Henry Thrun, Harvard
Devin Brosseau, Clarkson	F	Nick Abruzzese, Harvard
Josh Dunne, Clarkson	F	John Farinacci, Harvard
Haralds Egle, Clarkson	F	Gabriel Seger, Union

=== Hockey East ===
Award		Recipient
Player of the Year		Jeremy Swayman, Maine
Best Defensive Forward		Patrick Curry, Boston University
Best Defensive Defenseman		Wyatt Newpower, Connecticut
Rookie of the Year		Alex Newhook, Boston College
Goaltending Champion		Jeremy Swayman, Maine
Len Ceglarski Sportmanship Award		Benjamin Freeman, Connecticut
Three Stars Award		John Leonard, Massachusetts
Scoring Champion		Jack Dugan, Providence
Charlie Holt Team Sportsmanship Award		Connecticut
Bob Kullen Award (Coach of the Year)		Red Gendron, Maine
William Flynn Tournament Most Valuable Player		Not awarded due to the COVID-19 pandemic
Hockey East All-Star Teams
First Team	Position	Second Team
Jeremy Swayman, Maine	G	Spencer Knight, Boston College
Michael Callahan, Providence	D	Ben Finklestein, Boston College
David Farrance, Boston University	D	Ryan Shea, Northeastern
–	D	Wyatt Newpower, Connecticut
Jack Dugan, Providence	F	Mitchell Fossier, Maine
John Leonard, Massachusetts	F	Alex Newhook, Boston College
Tyler Madden, Northeastern	F	Tyce Thompson, Providence
Third Team	Position	Rookie Team
Tyler Wall, UMass Lowell	G	Spencer Knight, Boston College
Max Gildon, New Hampshire	D	Declan Carlile, Merrimack
Jesper Mattila, Boston College	D	Zac Jones, Massachusetts
Jake McLaughlin, Massachusetts	D	–
David Cotton, Boston College	F	Matt Boldy, Boston College
Patrick Harper, Boston University	F	Vladislav Firstov, Connecticut
Trevor Zegras, Boston University	F	Alex Newhook, Boston College
–	F	Trevor Zegras, Boston University

=== NCHC ===
Award		Recipient
Player of the Year		Scott Perunovich, Minnesota–Duluth
Rookie of the Year		Shane Pinto, North Dakota
Goaltender of the Year		Hunter Shepard, Minnesota–Duluth
Forward of the Year		Jordan Kawaguchi, North Dakota
Defensive Defenseman of the Year		Colton Poolman, North Dakota
Offensive Defenseman of the Year		Scott Perunovich, Minnesota–Duluth
Defensive Forward of the Year		Justin Richards, Minnesota–Duluth
Scholar-Athlete of the Year		Karch Bachman, Miami
Three Stars Award		Jordan Kawaguchi, North Dakota; Scott Perunovich, Minnesota–Duluth
Sportsmanship Award		Kobe Roth, Minnesota–Duluth
Herb Brooks Coach of the Year		Brad Berry, North Dakota
Frozen Faceoff MVP		Not awarded due to the COVID-19 pandemic
All-NCHC Teams
First Team	Position	Second Team
Hunter Shepard, Minnesota–Duluth	G	Dávid Hrenák, St. Cloud State
Scott Perunovich, Minnesota–Duluth	D	Matt Kiersted, North Dakota
Ian Mitchell, Denver	D	Jack Ahcan, St. Cloud State
Jordan Kawaguchi, North Dakota	F	Emilio Pettersen, Denver
Noah Cates, Minnesota–Duluth	F	Gordie Green, Miami
Cole Koepke, Minnesota–Duluth	F	
Hugh McGing, Western Michigan	F	
Honorable Mention	Position	Rookie Team
Adam Scheel, North Dakota	G	Magnus Chrona, Denver
Mattias Samuelsson, Western Michigan	D	Ronnie Attard, Western Michigan
Colton Poolman, North Dakota	D	Brandon Scanlin, Omaha
Chris Wilkie, Minnesota–Duluth	F	Bobby Brink, Denver
Nick Poehling, St. Cloud State	F	Shane Pinto, North Dakota
Westin Michaud, North Dakota	F	Joey Abate, Omaha
Taylor Ward, Omaha	F	

=== WCHA ===
Award		Recipient
Player of the Year		Marc Michaelis, Minnesota State
Offensive Player of the Year		Marc Michaelis, Minnesota State
Defensive Player of the Year		Alec Rauhauser, Bowling Green
Goaltender of the Year		Dryden McKay, Minnesota State
Rookie of the Year		Lucas Sowder, Minnesota State
Outstanding Student-Athlete of the Year		Edwin Hookenson, Minnesota State
Coach of the Year		Tom Serratore, Bemidji State
Scoring Champion		Griffin Loughran, Northern Michigan
Most Valuable Player in Tournament		Not awarded due to the COVID-19 pandemic
All-WCHA Hockey Teams
First Team	Position	Second Team
Dryden McKay, Minnesota State	G	Zach Driscoll, Bemidji State
Connor Mackey, Minnesota State	D	Tommy Muck, Bemidji State
Alec Rauhauser, Bowling Green	D	Philip Beaulieu, Northern Michigan
Marc Michaelis, Minnesota State	F	Griffin Loughran, Northern Michigan
Adam Brady, Bemidji State	F	Parker Tuomie, Minnesota State
Chris Jandric, Alaska	F	Max Humitz, Lake Superior State
Third Team	Position	Rookie Team
Matt Jurusik, Michigan Tech	G	John Hawthorne, Northern Michigan
Elias Rosén, Bemidji State	D	Elias Rosén, Bemidji State
Ian Scheid, Minnesota State	D	Jake Willets, Ferris State
Connor Ford, Bowling Green	F	Lucas Sowder, Minnesota State
Owen Sillinger, Bemidji State	F	Louis Boudon, Lake Superior State
Darien Craighead, Northern Michigan	F	Nathan Smith, Minnesota State

== 2020 NHL entry draft ==
Round	Pick	Player	College	Conference	NHL team
1	5	Jake Sanderson ^{†}	North Dakota	NCHC	Ottawa Senators
1	14	Dylan Holloway	Wisconsin	Big Ten	Edmonton Oilers
1	29	Brendan Brisson ^{†}	Michigan	Big Ten	Vegas Golden Knights
2	36	Sam Colangelo ^{†}	Northeastern	Hockey East	Anaheim Ducks
2	38	Thomas Bordeleau ^{†}	Michigan	Big Ten	San Jose Sharks
2	44	Tyler Kleven ^{†}	North Dakota	NCHC	Ottawa Senators
2	45	Brock Faber ^{†}	Minnesota	Big Ten	Los Angeles Kings
2	46	Drew Commesso ^{†}	Boston University	Hockey East	Chicago Blackhawks
2	47	Luke Tuch ^{†}	Boston University	Hockey East	Montreal Canadiens
2	50	Yan Kuznetsov	Connecticut	Hockey East	Calgary Flames
2	58	Mason Lohrei ^{†}	Ohio State	Big Ten	Boston Bruins
3	67	Ian Moore ^{†}	Harvard	ECAC Hockey	Anaheim Ducks
3	74	Ty Smilanic ^{†}	Quinnipiac	ECAC Hockey	Florida Panthers
3	79	Landon Slaggert ^{†}	Notre Dame	Big Ten	Chicago Blackhawks
3	80	Jake Boltmann ^{†}	Notre Dame	Big Ten	Calgary Flames
3	81	Wyatt Kaiser ^{†}	Minnesota–Duluth	NCHC	Chicago Blackhawks
3	83	Alex Laferriere ^{†}	Harvard	ECAC Hockey	Los Angeles Kings
3	86	Dylan Peterson ^{†}	Boston University	Hockey East	St. Louis Blues
3	89	Trevor Kuntar ^{†}	Boston College	Hockey East	Boston Bruins
3	91	Jackson Hallum ^{†}	Michigan	Big Ten	Vegas Golden Knights
4	95	Michael Benning ^{†}	Denver	NCHC	Florida Panthers
4	97	Sam Stange ^{†}	Wisconsin	Big Ten	Detroit Red Wings
4	100	Carter Savoie ^{†}	Denver	NCHC	Edmonton Oilers
4	102	Jack Smith ^{†}	Minnesota–Duluth	NCHC	Montreal Canadiens
4	105	Zachary Uens	Merrimack	Hockey East	Florida Panthers
4	109	Blake Biondi ^{†}	Minnesota–Duluth	NCHC	Montreal Canadiens
4	111	Mitchell Miller ^{†}	North Dakota	NCHC	Arizona Coyotes
4	113	Jackson Kunz ^{†}	North Dakota	NCHC	Vancouver Canucks
4	116	Eamon Powell ^{†}	Boston College	Hockey East	Tampa Bay Lightning
4	118	Colby Ambrosio ^{†}	Boston College	Hockey East	Colorado Avalanche
4	120	Ethan Edwards ^{†}	Michigan	Big Ten	New Jersey Devils
4	121	Alex Jefferies ^{†}	Merrimack	Hockey East	New York Islanders
4	124	Sean Farrell ^{†}	Harvard	ECAC Hockey	Montreal Canadiens
5	130	Artem Shlaine ^{†}	Connecticut	Hockey East	New Jersey Devils
5	131	Matteo Costantini ^{†}	North Dakota	NCHC	Buffalo Sabres
5	134	Brett Berard ^{†}	Providence	Hockey East	New York Rangers
5	136	Jakub Dobes ^{†}	Ohio State	Big Ten	Montreal Canadiens
5	139	Ryder Rolston ^{†}	Notre Dame	Big Ten	Colorado Avalanche
5	140	Ben Meehan ^{†}	Massachusetts–Lowell	Hockey East	Los Angeles Kings
5	142	Carson Bantle ^{†}	Michigan Tech	WCHA	Arizona Coyotes
5	144	Jacob Truscott ^{†}	Michigan	Big Ten	Vancouver Canucks
5	150	Matthew Kessel	Massachusetts	Hockey East	St. Louis Blues
5	151	Mason Langenbrunner ^{†}	Harvard	ECAC Hockey	Boston Bruins
6	156	Kyle Aucoin ^{†}	Harvard	ECAC Hockey	Detroit Red Wings
6	157	Nick Capone ^{†}	Connecticut	Hockey East	Tampa Bay Lightning
6	159	Lucas Mercuri ^{†}	Massachusetts	Hockey East	Carolina Hurricanes
6	166	Luke Reid ^{†}	New Hampshire	Hockey East	Nashville Predators
6	168	Veeti Miettinen ^{†}	St. Cloud State	NCHC	Toronto Maple Leafs
6	169	Filip Engarås	New Hampshire	Hockey East	Edmonton Oilers
6	170	Chase Yoder ^{†}	Providence	Hockey East	Pittsburgh Penguins
6	180	Joe Miller ^{†}	Minnesota	Big Ten	Toronto Maple Leafs
6	182	Riley Duran ^{†}	Providence	Hockey East	Boston Bruins
6	184	Noah Ellis ^{†}	Massachusetts	Hockey East	Vegas Golden Knights
7	187	Kienan Draper ^{†}	Miami	NCHC	Detroit Red Wings
7	189	John Fusco ^{†}	Harvard	ECAC Hockey	Toronto Maple Leafs
7	194	Noah Beck ^{†}	Clarkson	ECAC Hockey	St. Louis Blues
7	195	Wyatt Schingoethe ^{†}	Denver	NCHC	Toronto Maple Leafs
7	196	Alex Young ^{†}	Colgate	ECAC Hockey	San Jose Sharks
7	202	Gunnarwolfe Fontaine ^{†}	Northeastern	Hockey East	Nashville Predators
7	203	Chase Bradley ^{†}	Northeastern	Hockey East	Detroit Red Wings
7	207	Ethan Bowen ^{†}	North Dakota	NCHC	Anaheim Ducks
7	209	Chase McLane ^{†}	Penn State	Big Ten	Nashville Predators
7	210	Timofey Spitserov ^{†}	Massachusetts	Hockey East	San Jose Sharks
7	212	Devon Levi ^{†}	Northeastern	Hockey East	Florida Panthers
7	213	Ryan Tverberg ^{†}	Connecticut	Hockey East	Toronto Maple Leafs

† incoming freshman
Note: players who later became eligible for NCAA participation due to 2024 rule changes are not included.

== See also ==
- 2019–20 NCAA Division II men's ice hockey season
- 2019–20 NCAA Division III men's ice hockey season
