= 2019–20 Mercyhurst Lakers men's ice hockey season =

- Conference: 11th Atlantic Hockey
- Home ice: Mercyhurst Ice Center

Rankings
- USCHO.com: NR
- USA Today/ US Hockey Magazine: NR

Record
- Overall: 5–29–2
- Conference: 3–23–2–0
- Home: 3–15–0
- Road: 2–14–1
- Neutral: 0–0–0

Coaches and captains
- Head coach: Rick Gotkin
- Assistant coaches: Greg Gardner; Tom Upton
- Captain: Quinn Wichers
- Alternate captain(s): Brendan Riley; Michael Bevilacqua

The 2019–20 Mercyhurst Lakers men's ice hockey season was the 33rd season of play for the program, the 21st at the Division I level, and the 17th season in the Atlantic Hockey conference. The Lakers represented Mercyhurst University and were coached by Rick Gotkin, in his 32nd season.

== Season ==
After starting with a split over ranked Arizona State, Mercyhurst played a decent few weeks, opening conference play with two split weekends, but after the Thanksgiving break, the team sank to the bottom of the standings. After starting 4–6 the team went 1–23–2 to finish with the worst record in program history. The 2019–20 Lakers had the fewest wins, most losses, lowest winning percentage, and worst goal differential in 33 seasons of play. Additionally, despite Atlantic Hockey changing their standings so that wins were worth 3 points rather than 2, the 11 points the team had in the standings was by far the fewest Mercyhurst has garnered since becoming a Division I program.

== Departures ==
Player	Position	Nationality	Cause
Wes Baker	Forward	United States	Graduation (Signed with Chambéry)
Derek Barach	Forward	United States	Graduation (Signed with Cleveland Monsters)
Taylor Best	Forward	Canada	Graduation (Retired)
Tommaso Bucci	Forward	United States	Graduation (Signed with Pensacola Ice Flyers)
Alex Carlson	Forward	United States	Graduation (Signed with Knoxville Ice Bears)
Joseph Duszak	Defenseman	United States	Signed professional contract (Toronto Maple Leafs)
Joshua Lammon	Forward	United States	Graduation (Signed with Florida Everblades)
Chris Makowski	Forward	United States	Graduation (Retired)
Jonathan O'Hara	Defenseman	Canada	Graduation (Retired)
Matthew Whittaker	Forward	Canada	Graduation (Signed with Newfoundland Growlers)
Jeremy Wu	Defenseman	Canada	Graduation (Signed with Rapid City Rush)

== Recruiting ==
Player	Position	Nationality	Age	Notes
Khristian Acosta	Forward	United States	21	Port Monmouth, NJ
Jonathan Bendorf	Forward	United States	20	Yardville, NJ
Justin Cmunt	Forward	United States	21	East Amherst, MA
Gueorgui Feduolov	Forward	United States	20	Mentor, OH
Paul Maust	Forward	United States	21	Butler, PA
Joey Maziarz	Defenseman	Canada	20	Waterloo, ON
Brendan Schneider	Forward	Canada	19	Wellesley, ON
Dante Spagnuolo	Forward	Canada	21	Newmarket, ON
Ashton Stockie	Forward	Canada	20	Stratford, ON
Cade Townend	Defenseman	Canada	20	Carleton Place, ON
Carver Watson	Defenseman	United States	21	Appleton, WI

== Roster ==
As of June 28, 2019.

No.	Nat.	Player	Class	Pos	Height	Weight	DoB	Hometown	Previous team	NHL rights
1	(Canada)	Stefano Cantali	Junior	G	5' 11" (1.8 m)	180 lb (82 kg)	1997-06-13	Montreal, Quebec	Longueuil Collège Français (QJHL)	—
2	(Canada)	Cade Townend	Freshman	D	6' 1" (1.85 m)	200 lb (91 kg)	1999-06-17	Carleton Place, Ontario	Carleton Place Canadians (CCHL)	—
3	(United States)	Brendan Riley (A)	Senior	F	6' 1" (1.85 m)	180 lb (82 kg)	1996-03-29	West Point, New York	Boston Junior Bruins (USPHL)	—
4	(Canada)	Quinn Wichers (C)	Junior	D	6' 4" (1.93 m)	215 lb (98 kg)	1997-08-19	Metcalfe, Ontario	Kemptville 73's (CCHL)	—
5	(United States)	Michael Bevilacqua (A)	Sophomore	D	6' 1" (1.85 m)	220 lb (100 kg)	1997-05-07	Hamburg, New York	Green Bay Gamblers (USHL)	—
6	(Canada)	Dylan Thiessen	Sophomore	F	6' 0" (1.83 m)	185 lb (84 kg)	1998-01-09	Winnipeg, Manitoba	Virden Oil Capitals (MJHL)	—
7	(Canada)	Devon Daniels	Sophomore	D	6' 1" (1.85 m)	181 lb (82 kg)	1998-04-28	Thunder Bay, Ontario	Ottawa Jr. Senators (CCHL)	—
8	(Canada)	Owen Norton	Sophomore	D	5' 9" (1.75 m)	161 lb (73 kg)	1998-06-19	Ancaster, Ontario	Surrey Eagles (BCHL)	—
9	(United States)	Justin Cmunt	Freshman	F	5' 10" (1.78 m)	183 lb (83 kg)	1998-01-28	East Amherst, New York	Shreveport Mudbugs (NAHL)	—
10	(Canada)	Geoff Kitt	Sophomore	F	6' 3" (1.91 m)	179 lb (81 kg)	1997-02-09	Dryden, Ontario	Carleton Place Canadians (CCHL)	—
11		Steven Ipri	Sophomore	F	5' 11" (1.8 m)	154 lb (70 kg)	1998-03-13	Broadview Heights, Ohio	Lone Star Brahmas (NAHL)	—
13	(United States)	Paul Maust	Freshman	F	5' 10" (1.78 m)	168 lb (76 kg)	1998-06-24	Butler, Pennsylvania	Green Bay Gamblers (USHL)	—
14	(United States)	Gueorgui Feduolov	Freshman	F	5' 9" (1.75 m)	185 lb (84 kg)	1998-12-10	Mentor, Ohio	Shreveport Mudbugs (NAHL)	—
15	(Canada)	Dante Spagnuolo	Freshman	F	6' 0" (1.83 m)	180 lb (82 kg)	1998-09-04	Newmarket, Ontario	North York Rangers (OJHL)	—
16	(Canada)	Ashton Stockie	Freshman	D	6' 1" (1.85 m)	190 lb (86 kg)	1999-07-15	Stratford, Ontario	North York Rangers (OJHL)	—
18	(United States)	Dalton Hunter	Sophomore	F	6' 3" (1.91 m)	201 lb (91 kg)	1997-09-26	Greensburg, Pennsylvania	Dubuque Fighting Saints (USHL)	—
19	(Canada)	Corey Caruso	Junior	F	5' 11" (1.8 m)	187 lb (85 kg)	1996-04-06	Hamilton, Ontario	Brockville Braves (CCHL)	—
20	(United States)	Khristian Acosta	Freshman	F	5' 7" (1.7 m)	176 lb (80 kg)	1998-05-05	Port Monmouth, New Jersey	Tri-City Storm (USHL)	—
22	(Canada)	Brendan Schneider	Freshman	F	5' 9" (1.75 m)	175 lb (79 kg)	1998-08-26	Wellesley, Ontario	Merritt Centennials (BCHL)	—
23	(United States)	Jonny Lazarus	Senior	F	6' 0" (1.83 m)	191 lb (87 kg)	1996-03-22	Syosset, New York	Massachusetts (HEA)	—
24	(United States)	Ethan Johnson	Sophomore	F	5' 11" (1.8 m)	165 lb (75 kg)	1997-12-13	Newfolden, Minnesota	Waterloo Black Hawks (USHL)	—
25	(Canada)	Joseph Maziarz	Freshman	D	5' 11" (1.8 m)	190 lb (86 kg)	1999-02-23	Waterloo, Ontario	North York Rangers (OJHL)	—
26	(United States)	Jonathan Bendorf	Freshman	F	6' 0" (1.83 m)	180 lb (82 kg)	1999-02-26	Yardville, New Jersey	Aberdeen Wings (NAHL)	—
27	(United States)	James Anderson	Senior	F	5' 9" (1.75 m)	168 lb (76 kg)	1996-10-20	Kings Park, New York	P.A.L. Jr. Islanders (USPHL)	—
28	(United States)	Carver Watson	Freshman	D	5' 11" (1.8 m)	175 lb (79 kg)	1998-03-03	Appleton, Wisconsin	Vernon Vipers (BCHL)	—
29	(Canada)	Josh McDougall	Sophomore	D	5' 10" (1.78 m)	170 lb (77 kg)	1998-06-19	Prince Albert, Saskatchewan	Nipawin Hawks (SJHL)	—
33	(United States)	Colin DeAugustine	Senior	G	5' 9" (1.75 m)	165 lb (75 kg)	1995-05-25	Burgettstown, Pennsylvania	Youngstown Phantoms (USHL)	—
39	(United States)	Garrett Metcalf	Junior (RS)	G	6' 4" (1.93 m)	190 lb (86 kg)	1996-03-05	Salt Lake City, Utah	Massachusetts–Lowell (HEA)	ANA, 179th overall 2015

== Standings ==
2019–20 Atlantic Hockey Standings
	Conference record								Overall record					
	GP	W	L	T	3/SW	PTS	GF	GA	GP	W	L	T	GF	GA
#20 American International	28	21	6	1	0	64	96	46	34	21	12	1	103	68
Sacred Heart	28	18	8	2	0	56	104	63	34	21	10	3	127	82
RIT	28	15	9	4	1	50	86	73	36	19	13	4	108	98
Army	28	14	11	3	3	48	70	64	33	17	13	3	82	76
Niagara	28	12	12	4	2	42	64	65	34	12	18	4	72	87
Air Force	28	10	12	6	5	41	60	67	34	10	18	6	70	95
Robert Morris	28	11	12	5	3	41	65	65	34	11	18	5	75	90
Bentley	28	13	13	2	0	41	75	80	34	15	16	3	83	94
Canisius	28	9	13	6	3	36	71	83	34	10	18	6	80	109
Holy Cross	28	9	16	3	2	32	67	83	34	10	19	5	80	99
Mercyhurst	28	3	23	2	0	11	49	118	34	5	27	2	64	141
Championship: March 20, 2020 † indicates conference regular season champion; * indicates conference tournament champion Rankings: USCHO.com Top 20 Poll; updated March 1, 2020

== Schedule and results ==
Date	Time	Opponent^{#}	Rank^{#}	Site	TV	Decision	Result	Attendance	Record
Regular season
October 5	9:05 PM	at #20 Arizona State*		Oceanside Ice Arena • Tempe, Arizona		Metcalf	W 3–2	924	1–0–0
October 6	5:00 PM	at #20 Arizona State*		Oceanside Ice Arena • Tempe, Arizona		Metcalf	L 4–6	815	1–1–0
October 11	7:05 PM	vs. St. Lawrence*		Mercyhurst Ice Center • Erie, Pennsylvania		Metcalf	W 3–2 ^{OT}	578	2–1–0
October 12	7:05 PM	vs. St. Lawrence*		Mercyhurst Ice Center • Erie, Pennsylvania		Metcalf	L 2–3	830	2–2–0
October 25	7:05 PM	vs. #15 Ohio State*		Mercyhurst Ice Center • Erie, Pennsylvania		Metcalf	L 2–7	1,203	2–3–0
October 26	7:05 PM	vs. #15 Ohio State*		Mercyhurst Ice Center • Erie, Pennsylvania		Cantali	L 1–3	978	2–4–0
November 1	7:05 PM	at Bentley		Bentley Arena • Waltham, Massachusetts		Cantali	W 4–3 ^{OT}	1,953	3–4–0 (1–0–0–0)
November 2	7:05 PM	at Bentley		Bentley Arena • Waltham, Massachusetts		Cantali	L 3–6	2,038	3–5–0 (1–1–0–0)
November 15	7:05 PM	vs. American International		Mercyhurst Ice Center • Erie, Pennsylvania		Cantali	L 0–12	748	3–6–0 (1–2–0–0)
November 16	4:05 PM	vs. American International		Mercyhurst Ice Center • Erie, Pennsylvania		Metcalf	W 4–3 ^{OT}	687	4–6–0 (2–2–0–0)
November 21	7:05 PM	vs. Niagara		Mercyhurst Ice Center • Erie, Pennsylvania		Metcalf	L 0–5	815	4–7–0 (2–3–0–0)
November 22	7:05 PM	at Niagara		Dwyer Arena • Lewiston, New York		Metcalf	L 1–3	500	4–8–0 (2–4–0–0)
November 30	7:05 PM	at Robert Morris		Colonials Arena • Neville Township, Pennsylvania		Metcalf	T 2–2 ^{3x3 OTL}	803	4–8–1 (2–4–1–0)
December 6	9:05 PM	at RIT		Gene Polisseni Center • Henrietta, New York		Cantali	L 3–7	2,071	4–9–1 (2–5–1–0)
December 7	7:05 PM	at RIT		Gene Polisseni Center • Henrietta, New York		DeAugustine	L 2–3	2,227	4–10–1 (2–6–1–0)
January 3	7:05 PM	at Holy Cross		Hart Center • Worcester, Massachusetts		Metcalf	L 0–4	668	4–11–1 (2–7–1–0)
January 4	7:05 PM	at Holy Cross		Hart Center • Worcester, Massachusetts		Metcalf	L 2–7	437	4–12–1 (2–8–1–0)
January 10	7:05 PM	vs. Sacred Heart		Mercyhurst Ice Center • Erie, Pennsylvania		Metcalf	L 1–3	752	4–13–1 (2–9–1–0)
January 11	5:05 PM	vs. Sacred Heart		Mercyhurst Ice Center • Erie, Pennsylvania		Metcalf	L 3–9	759	4–14–1 (2–10–1–0)
January 14 †	7:05 PM	vs. Robert Morris		Mercyhurst Ice Center • Erie, Pennsylvania		Metcalf	L 1–4	759	4–15–1 (2–11–1–0)
January 17	7:05 PM	vs. Robert Morris		Mercyhurst Ice Center • Erie, Pennsylvania		Metcalf	W 2–1	876	5–15–1 (3–11–1–0)
January 18	7:05 PM	at Robert Morris		Colonials Arena • Neville Township, Pennsylvania		DeAugustine	L 1–5	801	5–16–1 (3–12–1–0)
January 24	7:05 PM	vs. Bentley		Mercyhurst Ice Center • Erie, Pennsylvania		Metcalf	L 3–4	879	5–17–1 (3–13–1–0)
January 25	4:05 PM	vs. Bentley		Mercyhurst Ice Center • Erie, Pennsylvania		DeAugustine	L 4–7	767	5–18–1 (3–14–1–0)
January 31	7:05 PM	vs. American International		MassMutual Center • Springfield, Massachusetts		Metcalf	L 3–4	576	5–19–1 (3–15–1–0)
February 1	1:05 PM	vs. American International		MassMutual Center • Springfield, Massachusetts		Metcalf	L 4–7	649	5–20–1 (3–16–1–0)
February 7	7:05 PM	at Niagara		Dwyer Arena • Lewiston, New York		Metcalf	L 0–3	720	5–21–1 (3–17–1–0)
February 8	7:05 PM	vs. Niagara		Mercyhurst Ice Center • Erie, Pennsylvania		Metcalf	L 2–4	749	5–22–1 (3–18–1–0)
February 14	7:05 PM	vs. Army		Mercyhurst Ice Center • Erie, Pennsylvania		Metcalf	L 1–5	789	5–23–1 (3–19–1–0)
February 15	7:05 PM	vs. Army		Mercyhurst Ice Center • Erie, Pennsylvania		Metcalf	L 1–4	957	5–24–1 (3–20–1–0)
February 21	9:05 PM	at Air Force		Cadet Ice Arena • Colorado Springs, Colorado		Metcalf	T 1–1 ^{3x3 OTL}	1,713	5–24–2 (3–20–2–0)
February 22	7:05 PM	at Air Force		Cadet Ice Arena • Colorado Springs, Colorado		Metcalf	L 1–2	1,931	5–25–2 (3–21–2–0)
February 28	7:05 PM	vs. Canisius		Mercyhurst Ice Center • Erie, Pennsylvania		Metcalf	L 2–3	736	5–26–2 (3–22–2–0)
February 29	7:05 PM	vs. Canisius		Mercyhurst Ice Center • Erie, Pennsylvania		DeAugustine	L 0–6	692	5–27–2 (3–23–2–0)
Atlantic Hockey Tournament
March 6	9:05 PM	at Air Force*		Cadet Ice Arena • Colorado Springs, Colorado (First Round Game 1)		Metcalf	L 1–3	1,208	5–28–2 (3–23–2–0)
March 7	9:05 PM	at Air Force*		Cadet Ice Arena • Colorado Springs, Colorado (First Round Game 2)		Metcalf	L 1–5	1,191	5–29–2 (3–23–2–0)
Mercyhurst Lost Series 0–2
*Non-conference game. ^{#}Rankings from USCHO.com Poll. All times are in Eastern Time.

† Rescheduled from November 29.

== Scoring Statistics ==
Name	Position	Games	Goals	Assists	Points	PIM
Dalton Hunter	RW	36	7	14	21	41
James Anderson	F	36	10	10	20	7
Steven Ipri	F	24	10	8	18	36
John McDougall	D/F	36	2	12	14	4
Gueorgui Feduolov	F	30	4	9	13	18
Joseph Maziarz	D	36	3	9	12	8
Owen Norton	D	36	3	8	11	48
Paul Maust	LW	30	4	5	9	45
Jonathan Bendorf	LW	24	3	6	9	2
Khristian Acosta	F	26	4	4	8	68
Geoff Kitt	C	32	4	3	7	14
Jonny Lazarus	F	34	2	5	7	4
Ethan Johnson	F	32	0	7	7	29
Justin Cmunt	LW	27	4	2	6	8
Carver Watson	LW	22	2	3	5	2
Brendan Riley	C	32	1	4	5	42
Cade Townend	D	31	2	1	3	8
Ashton Stockie	C	25	0	3	3	4
Quinn Wichers	D	36	1	1	2	20
Brendan Schneider	C	21	0	2	2	8
Michael Bevilacqua	D	23	0	2	2	4
Dante Spagnuolo	C	20	1	0	1	6
Devon Daniels	D	32	0	1	1	22
Corey Caruso	F	1	0	0	0	0
Stefano Cantali	G	6	0	0	0	0
Colin DeAugustine	G	10	0	0	0	0
Garrett Metcalf	G	28	0	0	0	10
Total						

== Goaltending statistics ==
Name	Games	Minutes	Wins	Losses	Ties	Goals against	Saves	Shut outs	SV %	GAA
Garrett Metcalf	28	1534	4	21	2	90	891	0	.908	3.52
Stefano Cantali	6	249	1	4	0	23	120	0	.839	5.53
Colin DeAugustine	10	365	0	4	0	36	207	0	.852	5.91
Empty Net	-	25	-	-	-	9	-	-	-	-
Total	36	2174	5	29	2	158	1218	0	.885	4.36

== Rankings ==
Poll	Week																							
Poll	Pre	1	2	3	4	5	6	7	8	9	10	11	12	13	14	15	16	17	18	19	20	21	22	23 (Final)
USCHO.com	NR	NR	NR	NR	NR	NR	NR	NR	NR	NR	NR	NR	NR	NR	NR	NR	NR	NR	NR	NR	NR	NR	NR	NR
USA Today	NR	NR	NR	NR	NR	NR	NR	NR	NR	NR	NR	NR	NR	NR	NR	NR	NR	NR	NR	NR	NR	NR	NR	NR
