= 2019–20 Niagara Purple Eagles men's ice hockey season =

- Conference: 5th Atlantic Hockey
- Home ice: Dwyer Arena

Rankings
- USCHO.com: NR
- USA Today/ US Hockey Magazine: NR

Record
- Overall: 12–18–4
- Conference: 12–12–4–2
- Home: 8–4–2
- Road: 4–14–2
- Neutral: 0–0–0

Coaches and captains
- Head coach: Jason Lammers
- Assistant coaches: Andy Boschetto; Matt Nicholson; Ian Burt
- Captain: Noah Delmas

The 2019–20 Niagara Purple Eagles men's ice hockey season was the 24th season of play for the program, the 22nd at the Division I level, and the 10th season in the Atlantic Hockey conference. The Purple Eagles represented Niagara University and were coached by Jason Lammers, in his 3rd season.

On March 12, 2020, Atlantic Hockey announced that the remainder of the conference tournament was cancelled due to the coronavirus pandemic.

== Roster ==
As of September 3, 2019.

No.	Nat.	Player	Class	Pos	Height	Weight	DoB	Hometown	Previous team	NHL rights
2	(United States)	Ryan Cook	Senior	D	6' 3" (1.91 m)	220 lb (100 kg)	1995-02-06	Lancaster, New York	Merrimack (HEA)	—
3	(United States)	Reed Robinson	Sophomore	F	6' 2" (1.88 m)	205 lb (93 kg)	1998-03-11	Rockwall, Texas	Wilkes-Barre/Scranton Knights (NAHL)	—
4	(Canada)	Chris Harpur	Junior	D	6' 3" (1.91 m)	200 lb (91 kg)	1996-09-13	Niagara-on-the-Lake, Ontario	Cowichan Valley Capitals (BCHL)	—
5	(United States)	Tyler Hayes	Senior	D	5' 11" (1.8 m)	175 lb (79 kg)	1996-04-26	Brighton, Michigan	Topeka RoadRunners (NAHL)	—
7	(United States)	Jordan Wishman	Sophomore	D	6' 1" (1.85 m)	187 lb (85 kg)	1998-11-22	Des Moines, Iowa	Dubuque Fighting Saints (USHL)	—
8	(Canada)	Stephen Kleysen	Sophomore	D	6' 0" (1.83 m)	195 lb (88 kg)	1997-02-12	Winnipeg, Manitoba	West Kelowna Warriors (BCHL)	—
9	(United States)	Eric Cooley	Junior	F	5' 9" (1.75 m)	175 lb (79 kg)	1998-05-05	Pittsburgh, Pennsylvania	Amarillo Bulls (NAHL)	—
10	(Canada)	Nic Mucci	Junior	F	5' 10" (1.78 m)	185 lb (84 kg)	1997-02-08	Mississauga, Ontario	Wellington Dukes (OJHL)	—
11	(Sweden)	Scott Persson	Freshman	D	5' 10" (1.78 m)	180 lb (82 kg)	2000-08-17	Kristianstad, Sweden	Lone Star Brahmas (NAHL)	—
13	(United States)	Zac Herrmann	Sophomore	D	6' 0" (1.83 m)	185 lb (84 kg)	1997-11-06	Lancaster, New York	Odessa Jackalopes (NAHL)	—
14	(United States)	Ryan Naumovski	Freshman	F	6' 0" (1.83 m)	150 lb (68 kg)	1999-07-28	Shelby Township, Michigan	New Jersey Titans (NAHL)	—
15	(Canada)	Kris Spriggs	Senior	F	6' 0" (1.83 m)	190 lb (86 kg)	1995-10-03	Edmonton, Alberta	Lloydminster Bobcats (AJHL)	—
16	(United States)	Jared Brandt	Junior (RS)	D	6' 0" (1.83 m)	195 lb (88 kg)	1995-10-26	St. Louis, Missouri	Miami (NCHC)	—
17	(United States)	Luke Edgerton	Sophomore	F	5' 10" (1.78 m)	180 lb (82 kg)	1997-05-01	Wheeling, West Virginia	Jersey Hitmen (NCDC)	—
18	(United States)	Dylan Mills	Sophomore	F	6' 3" (1.91 m)	205 lb (93 kg)	1999-08-18	Cottage Grove, Minnesota	Sioux City Musketeers (USHL)	—
19	(Canada)	Ryan Cox	Sophomore	F	5' 11" (1.8 m)	195 lb (88 kg)	1998-07-23	St. Albert, Alberta	Sherwood Park Crusaders (AJHL)	—
20	(Canada)	Noah Delmas (C)	Senior	F	6' 0" (1.83 m)	180 lb (82 kg)	1996-04-29	Schomberg, Ontario	Aurora Tigers (OJHL)	—
21	(United States)	Justin Kendall	Junior	F	6' 0" (1.83 m)	180 lb (82 kg)	1998-05-07	Holmen, Wisconsin	Coulee Region Chill (NAHL)	—
22	(United States)	Alex Truscott	Sophomore	F	5' 8" (1.73 m)	170 lb (77 kg)	1998-03-23	Draper, Utah	Minnesota Wilderness (NAHL)	—
23	(Canada)	Cam Cook	Sophomore	F	5' 11" (1.8 m)	188 lb (85 kg)	1997-11-13	Halifax, Nova Scotia	Shreveport Mudbugs (NAHL)	—
24	(Canada)	Ben Sokay	Senior	F	6' 0" (1.83 m)	170 lb (77 kg)	1997-01-24	Port Hope, Ontario	Wellington Dukes (OJHL)	—
25	(Canada)	Jon Hill	Sophomore	D	6' 2" (1.88 m)	200 lb (91 kg)	1998-10-09	Whitby, Ontario	Brockville Braves (CCHL)	—
26	(Canada)	Brandon Stanley	Sophomore	F	6' 2" (1.88 m)	202 lb (92 kg)	1997-05-03	Sioux Lookout, Ontario	Jamestown Rebels (NAHL)	—
27	(United States)	Jack Billings	Junior (RS)	F	5' 9" (1.75 m)	190 lb (86 kg)	1995-10-04	Oak Lawn, Illinois	Salve Regina Seahawks (CCC)	—
28	(United States)	Jack Zielinski	Junior	D	6' 2" (1.88 m)	205 lb (93 kg)	1996-08-08	Richmond, Virginia	Lone Star Brahmas (NAHL)	—
29	(Sweden)	Ludwig Stenlund	Sophomore	F	6' 3" (1.91 m)	190 lb (86 kg)	1997-04-16	Skellefteå, Sweden	Madison Capitols (USHL)	—
30	(United States)	Cole Weaver	Sophomore	G	6' 2" (1.88 m)	195 lb (88 kg)	1998-01-04	Champlin, Minnesota	Dubuque Fighting Saints (USHL)	—
31	(United States)	Chad Veltri	Freshman	G	5' 11" (1.8 m)	187 lb (85 kg)	1998-06-03	Pittsburgh, Pennsylvania	Youngstown Phantoms (USHL)	—
33	(Canada)	Brian Wilson	Junior	G	6' 4" (1.93 m)	185 lb (84 kg)	1996-09-27	Pickering, Ontario	Powell River Kings (BCHL)	—

== Standings ==
2019–20 Atlantic Hockey Standings
	Conference record								Overall record					
	GP	W	L	T	3/SW	PTS	GF	GA	GP	W	L	T	GF	GA
#20 American International	28	21	6	1	0	64	96	46	34	21	12	1	103	68
Sacred Heart	28	18	8	2	0	56	104	63	34	21	10	3	127	82
RIT	28	15	9	4	1	50	86	73	36	19	13	4	108	98
Army	28	14	11	3	3	48	70	64	33	17	13	3	82	76
Niagara	28	12	12	4	2	42	64	65	34	12	18	4	72	87
Air Force	28	10	12	6	5	41	60	67	34	10	18	6	70	95
Robert Morris	28	11	12	5	3	41	65	65	34	11	18	5	75	90
Bentley	28	13	13	2	0	41	75	80	34	15	16	3	83	94
Canisius	28	9	13	6	3	36	71	83	34	10	18	6	80	109
Holy Cross	28	9	16	3	2	32	67	83	34	10	19	5	80	99
Mercyhurst	28	3	23	2	0	11	49	118	34	5	27	2	64	141
Championship: March 20, 2020 † indicates conference regular season champion; * indicates conference tournament champion Rankings: USCHO.com Top 20 Poll; updated March 1, 2020

== Schedule and results ==
Date	Time	Opponent^{#}	Rank^{#}	Site	TV	Decision	Result	Attendance	Record
Exhibition
October 5	4:05 PM	vs. Ryerson*		Dwyer Arena • Lewiston, New York		Wilson	W 4–3	500	
Regular season
October 11	8:05 PM	at Minnesota*		3M Arena at Mariucci • Minneapolis, Minnesota	FSN	Wilson	L 2–3 ^{OT}	7,294	0–1–0
October 12	8:05 PM	at Minnesota*		3M Arena at Mariucci • Minneapolis, Minnesota	FSN	Veltri	L 2–4	7,802	0–2–0
October 25	7:05 PM	vs. Sacred Heart		Dwyer Arena • Lewiston, New York		Wilson	L 0–4	600	0–3–0 (0–1–0–0)
October 26	4:05 PM	vs. Sacred Heart		Dwyer Arena • Lewiston, New York		Wilson	L 1–3	350	0–4–0 (0–2–0–0)
November 1	9:07 PM	at #1 Denver*		Magness Arena • Denver, Colorado		Wilson	L 2–6	5,687	0–5–0 (0–2–0–0)
November 2	9:07 PM	at #1 Denver*		Magness Arena • Denver, Colorado		Veltri	L 0–4	5,805	0–6–0 (0–2–0–0)
November 8	7:05 PM	at RIT		Gene Polisseni Center • Henrietta, New York		Veltri	T 2–2 ^{3x3 OTW}	2,303	0–6–1 (0–2–1–1)
November 9	7:05 PM	vs. RIT		Dwyer Arena • Lewiston, New York		Veltri	L 1–4	819	0–7–1 (0–3–1–1)
November 15	7:35 PM	at Canisius		LECOM Harborcenter • Buffalo, New York (Battle of the Bridge)		Veltri	L 2–4	1,204	0–8–1 (0–4–1–1)
November 16	4:05 PM	at Canisius		LECOM Harborcenter • Buffalo, New York (Battle of the Bridge)		Wilson	W 5–3	657	1–8–1 (1–4–1–1)
November 22	7:05 PM	at Mercyhurst		Mercyhurst Ice Center • Erie, Pennsylvania		Wilson	W 5–0	815	2–8–1 (2–4–1–1)
November 23	7:05 PM	vs. Mercyhurst		Dwyer Arena • Lewiston, New York		Wilson	W 3–1	500	3–8–1 (3–4–1–1)
November 29	7:05 PM	vs. Air Force		Dwyer Arena • Lewiston, New York		Wilson	W 4–3 ^{OT}	639	4–8–1 (4–4–1–1)
November 30	7:05 PM	vs. Air Force		Dwyer Arena • Lewiston, New York		Wilson	T 1–1 ^{3x3 OTL}	907	4–8–2 (4–4–2–1)
December 13	1:05 PM	at American International		MassMutual Center • Springfield, Massachusetts		Wilson	L 1–3	219	4–9–2 (4–5–2–1)
December 14	1:10 PM	at American International		MassMutual Center • Springfield, Massachusetts		Wilson	T 0–0 ^{SOW}	467	4–9–3 (4–5–3–2)
January 3	7:07 PM	at #8 Penn State*		Pegula Ice Arena • University Park, Pennsylvania		Veltri	L 2–3	5,497	4–10–3 (4–5–3–2)
January 4	6:07 PM	at #8 Penn State*		Pegula Ice Arena • University Park, Pennsylvania		Veltri	L 0–2	5,819	4–11–3 (4–5–3–2)
January 10	7:05 PM	vs. Holy Cross		Dwyer Arena • Lewiston, New York		Wilson	L 3–6	300	4–12–3 (4–6–3–2)
January 11	4:05 PM	vs. Holy Cross		Dwyer Arena • Lewiston, New York		Veltri	T 2–2 ^{SOL}	300	4–12–4 (4–6–4–2)
January 17	9:05 PM	at Air Force		Cadet Ice Arena • Colorado Springs, Colorado		Wilson	L 3–4	1,916	4–13–4 (4–7–4–2)
January 18	7:05 PM	at Air Force		Cadet Ice Arena • Colorado Springs, Colorado		Veltri	L 1–2	1,912	4–14–4 (4–8–4–2)
January 24	7:05 PM	vs. Army		Dwyer Arena • Lewiston, New York		Veltri	W 4–1	751	5–14–4 (5–8–4–2)
January 25	4:05 PM	vs. Army		Dwyer Arena • Lewiston, New York		Veltri	W 3–2 ^{OT}	832	6–14–4 (6–8–4–2)
January 31	7:05 PM	at Bentley		Bentley Arena • Waltham, Massachusetts		Veltri	L 2–3 ^{OT}	1,166	6–15–4 (6–9–4–2)
February 1	7:05 PM	at Bentley		Bentley Arena • Waltham, Massachusetts		Wilson	L 2–4	1,365	6–16–4 (6–10–4–2)
February 7	7:05 PM	vs. Mercyhurst		Dwyer Arena • Lewiston, New York		Veltri	W 3–0	720	7–16–4 (7–10–4–2)
February 8	7:05 PM	at Mercyhurst		Mercyhurst Ice Center • Erie, Pennsylvania		Veltri	W 4–2	749	8–16–4 (8–10–4–2)
February 15	1:05 PM	at #20 Sacred Heart		Webster Bank Arena • Bridgeport, Connecticut		Veltri	L 0–6	437	8–17–4 (8–11–4–2)
February 16	1:05 PM	at #20 Sacred Heart		Webster Bank Arena • Bridgeport, Connecticut		Veltri	W 6–1	401	9–17–4 (9–11–4–2)
February 21	7:05 PM	vs. RIT		Dwyer Arena • Lewiston, New York		Veltri	W 4–1	912	10–17–4 (10–11–4–2)
February 22	7:05 PM	at RIT		Gene Polisseni Center • Henrietta, New York		Veltri	L 2–3 ^{OT}	3,015	10–18–4 (10–12–4–2)
February 28	7:05 PM	vs. Robert Morris		Dwyer Arena • Lewiston, New York		Veltri	W 5–0	975	11–18–4 (11–12–4–2)
February 29	7:00 PM	vs. Robert Morris		Dwyer Arena • Lewiston, New York		Veltri	W 5–2	981	12–18–4 (12–12–4–2)
Atlantic Hockey Tournament
Tournament Cancelled
*Non-conference game. ^{#}Rankings from USCHO.com Poll. All times are in Eastern Time.

== Scoring Statistics ==
Name	Position	Games	Goals	Assists	Points	PIM
Jack Billings	F	34	12	15	27	8
Ben Sokay	C	33	11	11	22	6
Ryan Naumovski	F	34	4	15	19	6
Ryan Cooley	RW	34	6	12	18	16
Noah Delmas	D	34	1	14	15	12
Chris Harpur	D	34	4	8	12	30
Luke Edgerton	F	29	2	10	12	12
Brandon Stanley	F	33	6	5	11	47
Jared Brandt	D	34	5	6	11	34
Ludwig Stenlund	C	16	5	5	10	12
Justin Kendall	F	31	5	5	10	14
Cam Cook	F	18	2	4	6	10
Jack Zielinski	D	27	1	5	6	8
Ryan Cox	F	29	1	5	6	29
Alex Truscott	F	20	3	2	5	8
Ryan Cook	D	26	3	2	5	48
Zach Herrmann	D	30	1	4	5	4
Jon Hill	D	18	4	0	4	6
Dylan Mills	C	27	3	1	4	56
Scott Persson	D	22	0	3	3	6
Jordan Wishman	D	29	0	3	3	20
Reed Robinson	F	24	2	0	2	2
Jason Pineo	C	12	0	2	2	8
Nic Mucci	F	11	1	0	1	8
Kris Spriggs	LW	6	0	1	1	2
Chad Veltri	G	19	0	1	1	0
Tyler Hayes	D	1	0	0	0	0
Brian Wilson	G	16	0	0	0	0
Bench	-	-	-	-	-	14
Total			82	139	221	426

== Goaltending statistics ==
Name	Games	Minutes	Wins	Losses	Ties	Goals against	Saves	Shut outs	SV %	GAA
Chad Veltri	19	1114	8	9	2	39	527	2	.931	2.10
Brian Wilson	16	931	4	9	2	42	459	2	.916	2.71
Empty Net	-	25	-	-	-	8	-	-	-	-
Total	34	2071	12	18	4	89	986	4	.917	2.58

== Rankings ==
Poll	Week																							
Poll	Pre	1	2	3	4	5	6	7	8	9	10	11	12	13	14	15	16	17	18	19	20	21	22	23 (Final)
USCHO.com	NR	NR	NR	NR	NR	NR	NR	NR	NR	NR	NR	NR	NR	NR	NR	NR	NR	NR	NR	NR	NR	NR	NR	NR
USA Today	NR	NR	NR	NR	NR	NR	NR	NR	NR	NR	NR	NR	NR	NR	NR	NR	NR	NR	NR	NR	NR	NR	NR	NR
