= Jack Rathbone =

American ice hockey player (born 1999)

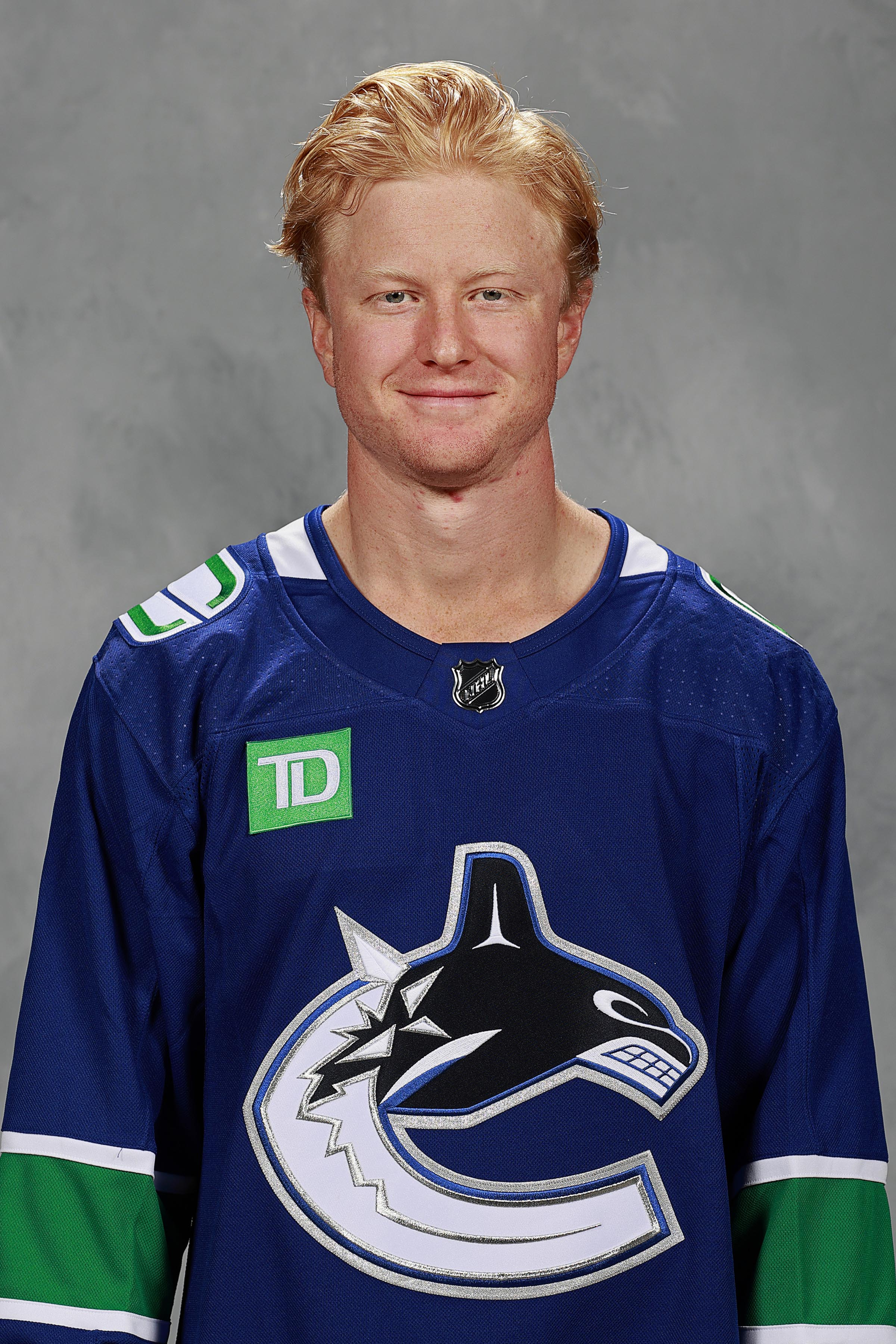
- Rathbone in 2023
- Born: May 20, 1999 (age 27) West Roxbury, Massachusetts, U.S.
- Height: 5 ft 11 in (180 cm)
- Weight: 188 lb (85 kg; 13 st 6 lb)
- Position: Defense
- Shoots: Left
- NHL team (P) Cur. team Former teams: Buffalo Sabres; Rochester Americans (AHL); Vancouver Canucks
- NHL draft: 95th overall, 2017; Vancouver Canucks
- Playing career: 2021–present

Jack Rathbone (born May 20, 1999) is an American professional ice hockey defenseman for the Rochester Americans of the American Hockey League (AHL) while under contract to the Buffalo Sabres of the National Hockey League (NHL). Rathbone was drafted 95th overall in the 2017 NHL entry draft by the Vancouver Canucks, with whom he began his NHL career.

== Early life ==
Rathbone was born in West Roxbury, Massachusetts to parents Jason and Beth. His father was a draft pick of the New York Islanders in 1988 and coached him during his time with the Cape Cod Whalers. Rathbone is also the oldest of three siblings, a brother and sister, and grew up a Boston Bruins fan.

== Playing career ==
=== Amateur ===
Growing up in Massachusetts, Rathbone played ice hockey for the Mass Midget Select League's Cape Cod Whalers and Dexter Southfield School. During his first year with the U18 Whalers team, he recorded eight goals and 18 points which he superseded the following year by posting 16 goals and 35 points in 22 games. Although Rathbone missed four weeks of the season due to a concussion, he was still considered a ALL-USA Player of the Year candidate. Rathbone committed to play NCAA Division I ice hockey with the Harvard Crimson in 2015 but chose to complete his education at Dexter rather than join the United States Hockey League (USHL) to remain closer to his family and autistic brother.

Throughout the 2016–17 season, Rathbone split his time between the Whalers, Dexter, and Youngstown Phantoms in the USHL. He played four games with the Phantoms and recorded one assist. During his senior year at Dexter, Rathbone was named captain and was ranked 57th overall by the NHL Central Scouting Bureau in their final ranking of North American skaters. Prior to graduating, Rathbone was drafted 95th overall in the 2017 NHL entry draft by the Vancouver Canucks.

=== Collegiate ===
Rathbone joined the Harvard Crimson men's ice hockey team to compete in their 2018–19 season and received the Don Parsons Memorial Scholarship in recognition of his "character, community service, leadership and academics." As a freshman at Harvard, Rathbone skated in 33 games and finished the season with seven goals and 15 assists for 22 points. His first collegiate goal came against the Quinnipiac Bobcats on November 2, 2018, and he finished the year with a seven-game point-streak. His seventh point in the same number of games came during a loss against Clarkson which effectively knocked Harvard out of the ECAC playoffs. As he completed the season second amongst league rookies in points, he was named to the ECAC Hockey All-Rookie Team.

Rathbone re-joined the Harvard Crimson for his sophomore year and recorded 31 points in 28 games as the season was cut short due to COVID-19. Prior to the seasons' cancellation, Rathbone earned national recognition with an election to the First Team All-ECAC Hockey team and AHCA All-American First Team. Once the season was cancelled, Rathbone returned home and debated whether he should return to college or start his professional career.

=== Professional ===
On July 14, 2020, Rathbone signed a three-year entry-level contract with the Canucks, thus concluding his collegiate career. On May 6, 2021, Rathbone scored his first NHL goal in a 6–3 win against the Edmonton Oilers.

On October 17, 2023, Rathbone was traded by the Canucks alongside Karel Plášek to the Pittsburgh Penguins, in exchange for Mark Friedman and Ty Glover. He played out the remainder of the season with Pittsburgh's AHL affiliate, the Wilkes-Barre/Scranton Penguins, registering 8 goals and 24 points through 67 regular season games.

As a free agent from the Penguins, Rathbone was signed to a one-year, two-way contract with the Buffalo Sabres on July 1, 2024.

== International play ==
Rathbone was named to Team USA to compete during the 2015 Under-17 Five Nations Tournament. He recorded two goals in their final game against Germany to clinch first place at the tournament.

== Career statistics ==
			Regular season					Playoffs
Season	Team	League	GP	G	A	Pts	PIM	GP	G	A	Pts	PIM
2014–15	Dexter Southfield School	USHS	31	3	4	7	—	—	—	—	—	—
2015–16	Dexter Southfield School	USHS	29	11	15	26	—	—	—	—	—	—
2016–17	Dexter Southfield School	USHS	22	16	19	35	—	—	—	—	—	—
2016–17	Youngstown Phantoms	USHL	4	0	1	1	0	—	—	—	—	—
2017–18	Dexter Southfield School	USHS	17	11	19	30	—	—	—	—	—	—
2018–19	Harvard University	ECAC	33	7	15	22	8	—	—	—	—	—
2019–20	Harvard University	ECAC	28	7	24	31	16	—	—	—	—	—
2020–21	Utica Comets	AHL	8	2	7	9	2	—	—	—	—	—
2020–21	Vancouver Canucks	NHL	8	1	2	3	0	—	—	—	—	—
2021–22	Vancouver Canucks	NHL	9	0	0	0	2	—	—	—	—	—
2021–22	Abbotsford Canucks	AHL	39	10	30	40	15	2	0	1	1	0
2022–23	Vancouver Canucks	NHL	11	1	1	2	2	—	—	—	—	—
2022–23	Abbotsford Canucks	AHL	37	5	9	14	12	6	2	1	3	4
2023–24	Abbotsford Canucks	AHL	2	1	0	1	2	—	—	—	—	—
2023–24	Wilkes-Barre/Scranton Penguins	AHL	67	8	16	24	21	2	1	1	2	0
2024–25	Rochester Americans	AHL	63	6	17	23	51	8	0	3	3	8
2025–26	Rochester Americans	AHL	49	5	13	18	26	3	0	0	0	4
NHL totals			28	2	3	5	4	—	—	—	—	—

== Awards and honors ==
Award	Year
USHS
(East) All-New England First Team	2017
All-USA Hockey First Team	2017
All-USA Hockey Second Team	2018
College
ECAC All-Rookie Team	2019
ECAC First All-Star Team	2020
All-Ivy League First Team	2020
New England D1 All-Stars	2020
East First All-American Team	2020
All-USCHO Second Team	2020
AHL
All-Rookie Team	2022
