= 2020 Atlantic Hockey men's ice hockey tournament =

2020 Atlantic Hockey Men's ice hockey tournament
- Dates: March 6–21, 2020
- Teams: 11
- Finals site: HarborCenter; Buffalo, New York
- Atlantic Hockey Men's Ice Hockey Tournaments

The 2020 Atlantic Hockey Tournament was the 16th Atlantic Hockey Tournament. It was scheduled to be played between March 6 and March 21, 2020, at home campus locations and at the HarborCenter in Buffalo, New York. On March 12, 2020, Atlantic Hockey announced that the remainder of the tournament was cancelled due to the coronavirus pandemic.

== Format ==
The tournament featured four rounds of play. In the first round the sixth and eleventh, seventh and tenth, and eighth and ninth seeds, as determined by the conference regular season standings, played a best-of-three series with the winners advancing to the quarterfinals. The top five teams from the conference regular season standings received a bye to the quarterfinals. There, the first seed and lowest-ranked first-round winner, the second seed and second-highest-ranked first-round winner, the third seed and highest-ranked first-round winner, and the fourth seed and the fifth seed will play a best-of-three series, with the winners advancing to the semifinals. In the semifinals, the highest and lowest seeds and second-highest and second-lowest remaining seeds will play a single game each, with the winners advancing to the championship game. The tournament champion will receive an automatic bid to the 2020 NCAA Division I Men's Ice Hockey Tournament.

== Conference standings ==
2019–20 Atlantic Hockey Standings
	Conference record								Overall record					
	GP	W	L	T	3/SW	PTS	GF	GA	GP	W	L	T	GF	GA
#20 American International	28	21	6	1	0	64	96	46	34	21	12	1	103	68
Sacred Heart	28	18	8	2	0	56	104	63	34	21	10	3	127	82
RIT	28	15	9	4	1	50	86	73	36	19	13	4	108	98
Army	28	14	11	3	3	48	70	64	33	17	13	3	82	76
Niagara	28	12	12	4	2	42	64	65	34	12	18	4	72	87
Air Force	28	10	12	6	5	41	60	67	34	10	18	6	70	95
Robert Morris	28	11	12	5	3	41	65	65	34	11	18	5	75	90
Bentley	28	13	13	2	0	41	75	80	34	15	16	3	83	94
Canisius	28	9	13	6	3	36	71	83	34	10	18	6	80	109
Holy Cross	28	9	16	3	2	32	67	83	34	10	19	5	80	99
Mercyhurst	28	3	23	2	0	11	49	118	34	5	27	2	64	141
Championship: March 20, 2020 † indicates conference regular season champion; * indicates conference tournament champion Rankings: USCHO.com Top 20 Poll; updated March 1, 2020

== Bracket ==
Teams are reseeded for the quarterfinals and semifinals

First round March 6–8
6	Air Force	3	5	—
11	Mercyhurst	1	1	—
7	Robert Morris	0	2*	5
10	Holy Cross	2	1	1
8	Bentley	6	5	—
9	Canisius	1	3	—

Quarterfinals; March 13–15
1	American International
8	Bentley
2	Sacred Heart
7	Robert Morris
3	RIT
6	Air Force
4	Army
5	Niagara

Semifinals; March 20

Championship; March 21

Note: * denotes overtime period(s)
