= 2020 NCAA Division I men's ice hockey tournament =

Sports tournament

- Teams: 16
- Finals site: Little Caesars Arena; Detroit, Michigan (cancelled)
- Champions: None

The 2020 NCAA Division I men's ice hockey tournament was a planned national championship tournament for men's college ice hockey in the United States that was scheduled to take place from April 9–11, 2020. The tournament was to involve 16 teams in single-elimination play to determine the national champion at the Division I level of the National Collegiate Athletic Association (NCAA), the highest level of competition in college hockey. The tournament's Frozen Four – the semifinals and finals – was to be hosted by Michigan State University and the Detroit Sports Commission at the Little Caesars Arena in Detroit, Michigan. This was slated to be the seventh Frozen Four in the city of Detroit, with the most recent visitation being at Ford Field in 2010.

On March 11, 2020, the NCAA announced the entire tournament would be conducted with "only essential staff and limited family attendance" due to the COVID-19 pandemic. The following day, the NCAA announced that all NCAA championships for spring sports would be cancelled due to the pandemic.

== Tournament procedure ==
2020 Regionals (blue) and Frozen Four (red)

The tournament was to comprise four groups of four teams in regional brackets. The four regionals were officially named after their geographic areas.

March 27–28, 2020
Northeast Regional, DCU Center – Worcester, Massachusetts (Host: Holy Cross)
West Regional, Budweiser Events Center – Loveland, Colorado (Host: Denver)
March 28–29, 2020
East Regional, Times Union Center – Albany, New York (Host: ECAC Hockey)
Midwest Regional, PPL Center – Allentown, Pennsylvania (Host: Penn State)

The winner of each regional was to advance to the Frozen Four:

April 9–11
Little Caesars Arena – Detroit, Michigan (Host: Michigan State University)
