= List of RIT Tigers men's ice hockey seasons =

The RIT Tigers men's ice hockey team has been in existence since 1959 and a varsity program since 1964, competing in all three divisions of collegiate ice hockey and winning two national championships. The team has seen seven head coaches, 35 winning varsity seasons, and 14 national tournament appearances. The has played in the Atlantic Hockey Association in Division I of the NCAA since the 2006–07 season.

The team's home arena is the Gene Polisseni Center on the RIT campus in Henrietta, New York. From the 1968-69 season through the 2013-14 season, the Tigers played their home games at the Frank Ritter Memorial Ice Arena on the RIT campus. Prior to the establishment of the Henrietta campus, the team played at the Ritter-Clark Rink (now the F. Ritter Shumway Arena) on the college's downtown Rochester campus; the first season at Ritter-Clark was 1962–63. In 1959–60 and 1961–62, the team played at the Rochester War Memorial downtown; in 1960–61, the team played no home games. Since moving to Henrietta, several home games have been played downtown at the War Memorial (now called the Blue Cross Arena), including the school's annual Brick City Homecoming Game.

== Season-by-season results ==
Note: GP = Games played, W = Wins, L = Losses, T = Ties

NCAA Champions	NCAA Frozen Four	Conference regular season champions	Conference Playoff Champions

Season	Conference	Regular Season (Note: Code explanation; GP—Games Played, W—Wins, L—Losses, T—Tied games, OTW—Overtime Wins, OTL—Overtime Loses, 3/SW—Win in 3 on 3 overtime or shootout, Pts—Points*)														Conference Tournament Results	National Tournament Results
Season	Conference	Conference									Overall					Conference Tournament Results	National Tournament Results
Season	Conference	GP	W	L	T	OTW	OTL	3/SW	Pts*	Finish	GP	W	L	T	%	Conference Tournament Results	National Tournament Results
College Division
Jim Heffer (1964–1968)
1964–65	FLCHL	–	–	–	–	–	–	–	–	–	17	11	6	0	.647		
1965–66	FLCHL	–	–	–	–	–	–	–	–	–	20	15	5	0	.750		
1966–67	FLCHL	–	–	–	–	–	–	–	–	–	15	7	7	1	.500		
1967–68	FLCHL	–	–	–	–	–	–	–	–	–	18	10	8	0	.556		
Daryl Sullivan (1968–1980)
1968–69	FLCHL	–	–	–	–	–	–	–	–	–	27	17	9	1	.648		
1969–70	FLCHL	–	–	–	–	–	–	–	–	–	26	9	17	0	.346		
1970–71	FLCHL	–	–	–	–	–	–	–	–	–	16	7	9	0	.438		
1971–72	FLCHL	–	–	–	–	–	–	–	–	–	20	11	9	0	.550		
1972–73	ECAC 3	12	3	8	1	–	–	–	.292	–	25	14	10	1	.580		
NCAA Division III
1973–74	ECAC 3	14	3	11	0	–	–	–	.214	–	24	11	13	0	.458		
1974–75	ECAC 3	12	2	10	0	–	–	–	.167	–	24	9	15	0	.375		
1975–76	ECAC 3	13	5	8	0	–	–	–	.385	–	25	12	13	0	.480	Lost Semifinal, 0–11 (Worcester State)	
1976–77	ECAC 3	15	2	13	0	–	–	–	.133	–	22	6	16	0	.273		
1977–78	ECAC 3	12	4	7	1	–	–	–	.375	–	17	8	8	1	.500		
1978–79	ECAC 3	12	9	3	0	–	–	–	.750	–	22	15	7	0	.682	Lost Semifinal, 6–9 (Trinity)	
1979–80	ECAC 3	12	6	6	0	–	–	–	.500	–	22	12	10	0	.545	Won Semifinal, 8–4 (Amherst); Lost Championship, 6–7 (OT) (Bentley)	
NCAA Division II
Brian Mason (1980–1984)
1980–81	ECAC 2	15	7	8	0	–	–	–	.467	–	24	14	10	0	.583		
1981–82	ECAC 2	26	16	7	1	–	–	–	.712	T–5th	31	20	10	1	.661	Lost Western Quarterfinal, 3–5 (North Adams State)	
1981–82	NYCHA	14	11	3	0	–	–	–	22	2nd	31	20	10	1	.661	Lost Western Quarterfinal, 3–5 (North Adams State)	
1982–83	ECAC 2	22	18	4	0	–	–	–	.818	2nd	32	23	9	0	.719	Lost West Quarterfinal, 3–5 (Middlebury)	Won Quarterfinal series, 9–7 (Mankato State); Won Semifinal, 4–1 (Lowell); Won Championship, 4–2 (Bemidji State)
1982–83	NYCHA	16	15	1	0	–	–	–	30	1st	32	23	9	0	.719	Lost West Quarterfinal, 3–5 (Middlebury)	Won Quarterfinal series, 9–7 (Mankato State); Won Semifinal, 4–1 (Lowell); Won Championship, 4–2 (Bemidji State)
1983–84	ECAC 2	20	18	2	0	–	–	–	.900	1st	35	29	6	0	.829	Won West Quarterfinal, 3–0 (Hamilton); Won Western Semifinal, 6–2 (Plattsburgh State); Won Championship, 3–1 (Union)	Won Quarterfinal series, 23–3 (Oswego State); Lost Semifinal, 4–5 (4OT) (Union); Won Third-place game, 10–1 (Augsburg)
1983–84	NYCHA	18	17	1	0	–	–	–	34	1st	35	29	6	0	.829	Won West Quarterfinal, 3–0 (Hamilton); Won Western Semifinal, 6–2 (Plattsburgh State); Won Championship, 3–1 (Union)	Won Quarterfinal series, 23–3 (Oswego State); Lost Semifinal, 4–5 (4OT) (Union); Won Third-place game, 10–1 (Augsburg)
NCAA Division III
Bruce Delventhal (1984–1988)
1984–85	ECAC 2	19	17	2	0	–	–	–	.895	1st	35	29	6	0	.829	Won Semifinal, 10–1 (Oswego State); Lost Championship, 3–7 (Union)	Won Quarterfinal series, 10–6 (St. Thomas); Won Semifinal, 3–2 (Union); Won Championship, 5–1 (Bemidji State)
1984–85	NYCHA	18	17	1	0	–	–	–	34	1st	35	29	6	0	.829	Won Semifinal, 10–1 (Oswego State); Lost Championship, 3–7 (Union)	Won Quarterfinal series, 10–6 (St. Thomas); Won Semifinal, 3–2 (Union); Won Championship, 5–1 (Bemidji State)
1985–86	ECAC West	23	20	3	0	–	–	–	.870	1st	37	31	6	0	.838	Won Semifinal, 8–6 (Union); Won Championship, 9–5 (Plattsburgh State)	Won Quarterfinal series, 12–8 (Union); Lost Semifinal, 3–4 (OT) (Bemidji State); Won Third-place game, 6–0 (Mankato State)
1985–86	NYCHA	18	15	3	0	–	–	–	30	T–1st	37	31	6	0	.838	Won Semifinal, 8–6 (Union); Won Championship, 9–5 (Plattsburgh State)	Won Quarterfinal series, 12–8 (Union); Lost Semifinal, 3–4 (OT) (Bemidji State); Won Third-place game, 6–0 (Mankato State)
1986–87	ECAC West	19	13	6	0	–	–	–	.684	4th	28	16	12	0	.571	Lost Quarterfinal, 0–2 (Canisius)	
1987–88	ECAC West	21	13	7	1	–	–	–	.643	5th	30	14	15	1	.483	Won Quarterfinal, 5–4 (OT) (Union); Lost Semifinal, 4–8 (Elmira)	
Buddy Powers (1988–1989)
1988–89	ECAC West	22	19	2	1	–	–	–	.886	1st	36	26	8	2	.750	Won Quarterfinal, 9–3 (Cortland State); Won semifinal, 4–1 (Elmira); Won Championship, 5–3 (Union)	Won Quarterfinal series, 2–1 (Oswego State); Won Semifinal series, 2–0 (Babson); Lost Championship series, 0–1–1 (Wisconsin–Stevens Point)
Eric Hoffberg (1989–1999)
1989–90	ECAC West	20	16	2	2	–	–	–	.850	1st	29	19	8	2	.690	Lost Quarterfinal, 5–7 (Oswego State)	
1990–91	ECAC West	21	14	5	2	–	–	–	.714	3rd	28	16	10	2	.354	Won Quarterfinal, 6–3 (Union); Lost Semifinal, 1–4 (Mercyhurst)	
1991–92	ECAC West	24	11	11	2	–	–	–	.500	7th	29	12	15	2	.448	Lost Quarterfinal, 2–7 (Elmira)	
1992–93	ECAC West	24	11	12	1	–	–	–	.479	5th	25	11	13	1	.460		
1993–94	ECAC West	10	6	4	0	–	–	–	12	T–3rd	30	20	8	2	.700	Won Semifinal, 4–3 (Canisius); Won Championship, 5–2 (Elmira)	Lost Quarterfinal series, 0–1–1 (Fredonia State)
1994–95	ECAC West	8	5	2	1	–	–	–	.688	2nd	28	17	8	3	.661	Won Semifinal, 5–4 (2OT) (Canisius); Lost Championship, 2–9 (Mercyhurst)	
1995–96	ECAC West	8	5	2	1	–	–	–	.688	T–1st	32	25	6	1	.621	Won Semifinal, 10–6 (Elmira); Won Championship, 3–2 (OT) (Canisius)	Won Quarterfinal series, 2–0 (Potsdam State); Won Semifinal, 2–1 (Wisconsin–River Falls); Lost Championship, 2–3 (Middlebury)
1996–97	ECAC West	10	8	1	1	–	–	–	.850	1st	30	21	7	2	.733	Won Semifinal, 3–2 (OT) (Canisius); Lost Championship, 4–5 (2OT) (Elmira)	Lost Quarterfinal series, 0–2 (Middlebury)
1997–98	ECAC West	10	7	1	2	–	–	–	.800	2nd	29	20	4	5	.776	Won Semifinal, 3–0 (Mercyhurst); Lost Championship, 2–5 (Niagara)	Lost Quarterfinal series, 1–2 (Plattsburgh State)
1998–99	ECAC West	6	4	0	2	–	–	–	10	1st	32	27	3	2	.875	Won Semifinal, 10–3 (Hobart); Won Championship, 6–1 (Mercyhurst)	Won Quarterfinal series, 2–0 (Amherst); Lost Semifinal, 3–9 (Middlebury); Lost Third-place game, 2–9 (Norwich)
Wayne Wilson (1999–2025)
1999–00	ECAC West	6	5	1	0	–	–	–	10	1st	29	21	7	1	.741	Won Semifinal, 10–1 (Hobart); Won Championship, 3–1 (Elmira)	Lost Quarterfinal series, 0–2 (Norwich)
2000–01	ECAC West	6	6	0	0	–	–	–	12	1st	29	27	1	1	.948	Won Semifinal, 9–1 (Hobart); Won Championship, 8–2 (Manhattanville)	Won Quarterfinal series, 2–0 (Lebanon Valley); Won Semifinal, 5–2 (Wisconsin–River Falls); Lost Championship, 2–6 (Plattsburgh State)
2001–02	ECAC West	10	9	1	0	–	–	–	18	1st	27	23	2	2	.889	Won Semifinal, 10–1 (Hobart); Won Championship, 2–1 (Elmira)	Lost Quarterfinal series, 0–1–2 (Plattsburgh State)
2002–03	ECAC West	10	8	1	1	–	–	–	17	1st	25	19	4	2	.800	Won Semifinal, 6–2 (Hobart); Lost Championship, 3–4 (Elmira)	
2003–04	ECAC West	10	6	2	2	–	–	–	14	T–2nd	25	13	7	5	.620	Won Semifinal, 4–2 (Manhattanville); Lost Championship, 1–3 (Hobart)	
2004–05	ECAC West	12	7	4	1	–	–	–	15	3rd	24	13	10	1	.563	Lost Semifinal, 2–6 (Manhattanville)	
NCAA Division I
2005–06	Independent	–	–	–	–	–	–	–	–	–	30	6	22	2	.233		
2006–07	Atlantic Hockey	28	20	7	1	–	–	–	41	1st	34	21	11	2	.647	†	
2007–08	Atlantic Hockey	28	15	8	5	–	–	–	35	2nd	37	19	12	6	.595	Won Quarterfinal series, 2–0 (Holy Cross); Lost Semifinal, 0–5 (Air Force)	
2008–09	Atlantic Hockey	28	20	6	2	–	–	–	42	T–1st	38	23	13	2	.632	Won Quarterfinal series, 2–1 (Holy Cross); Lost Semifinal, 4–5 (OT) (Mercyhurst)	
2009–10	Atlantic Hockey	28	22	5	1	–	–	–	45	1st	41	28	12	1	.695	Won Quarterfinal series, 2–0 (Connecticut); Won Semifinal, 4–0 (Canisius); Won Championship, 6–1 (Sacred Heart)	Won Regional semifinal, 1–2 (Denver); Won Regional Final, 6–2 (New Hampshire); Lost National semifinal, 1–8 (Wisconsin)
2010–11	Atlantic Hockey	28	15	5	7	–	–	–	37	1st	38	19	11	8	.605	Won Quarterfinal series, 2–0 (American International); Won Semifinal, 4–2 (Connecticut); Lost Championship, 0–1 (Air Force)	
2011–12	Atlantic Hockey	27	14	7	6	–	–	–	34	T–3rd	39	20	13	6	.590	Won Quarterfinal series, 2–1 (Bentley); Won Semifinal, 2–1 (OT) (Niagara); Lost Championship, 0–4 (Air Force)	
2012–13	Atlantic Hockey	27	11	12	4	–	–	–	26	T–7th	38	15	18	5	.461	Won First round series, 2–0 (American International); Lost Quarterfinal series, 0–2 (Niagara)	
2013–14	Atlantic Hockey	27	10	14	3	–	–	–	23	9th	37	12	20	5	.392	Lost First round series, 1–2 (Holy Cross)	
2014–15	Atlantic Hockey	28	14	9	5	–	–	–	33	T–3rd	40	20	15	5	.563	Won Quarterfinal series, 2–0 (Air Force); Won Semifinal, 2–1 (Canisius); Won Championship, 5–1 (Mercyhurst)	Won Regional semifinal, 2–1 (Minnesota State); Lost Regional Final, 0–4 (Omaha)
2015–16	Atlantic Hockey	28	14	9	5	–	–	–	33	5th	39	18	15	6	.538	Won Quarterfinal series, 2–0 (Mercyhurst); Won Semifinal, 2–1 (OT) (Air Force); Won Championship, 7–4 (Robert Morris)	Lost Regional semifinal, 0–4 (Quinnipiac)
2016–17	Atlantic Hockey	28	13	15	0	–	–	–	26	T–6th	37	14	22	1	.392	Lost First round series, 1–2 (Niagara)	
2017–18	Atlantic Hockey	28	13	14	1	–	–	–	27	T–6th	37	15	20	2	.432	Lost First round series, 1–2 (Sacred Heart)	
2018–19	Atlantic Hockey	28	13	11	4	–	–	–	30	5th	38	17	17	4	.500	Won Quarterfinal series, 2–1 (Sacred Heart); Lost Semifinal, 0–1 (OT) (Niagara)	
2019–20	Atlantic Hockey	28	15	9	4	–	–	1	50	3rd	36	19	13	4	.583	Tournament Cancelled	
2020–21	Atlantic Hockey	13	7	5	1	0	0	1	23	5th	20	9	9	2	.500	Lost Atlantic Hockey Quarterfinal series, 0–2 (Canisius)	
2021–22	Atlantic Hockey	26	12	10	4	1	3	3	41	4th	38	18	16	4	.526	Won Atlantic Hockey Quarterfinal series, 2–1 (Sacred Heart); Lost Semifinal, 3–4 (Air Force)	
2022–23	Atlantic Hockey	26	18	7	1	1	2	0	57	1st	39	25	13	1	.654	Won Atlantic Hockey Quarterfinal series, 2–0 (Mercyhurst); Lost Semifinal series, 1–2 (Holy Cross)	
2023–24	Atlantic Hockey	26	18	7	1	3	2	0	54	1st	40	27	11	2	.700	Won Quarterfinal series, 2–0 (Robert Morris); Won Semifinal series, 2–0 (Niagara); Won Championship, 5–2 (American International)	Lost Regional semifinal, 3–6 (Boston University)
2024–25	AHA	26	9	15	2	2	0	1	28	9th	35	10	23	2	.314	Lost AHA First Round, 1–2 (OT) (American International)	
Matt Thomas (2025–Present)
2025–26	AHA	26	13	11	2	2	1	2	42	5th	36	17	17	2	.500	Lost AHA Quarterfinal series, 0–2 (Holy Cross)	
Totals											GP	W	L	T	%	Championships	
Regular Season											1681	955	615	111	.601	2 ECAC 2 Championships, 4 NYCHA Championships, 10 ECAC West Championships, 6 Atlantic Hockey Championships	
Conference Post-season											110	68	42	0	.618	1 ECAC 2 tournament championship, 8 ECAC West tournament championships, 4 Atlantic Hockey tournament championships	
NCAA Post-season											54	29	21	4	.574	12 NCAA Division III Tournament appearances, 1 NCAA Division II Tournament appearance, 4 NCAA Division I Tournament appearances	
Regular Season and Post-season Record											1845	1052	688	115	.598	1 NCAA Division III National Championship, 1 NCAA Division II National Championship	

* Winning percentage is used when conference schedules are unbalanced.
† RIT was ineligible for the postseason in 2007.
