= 2015–16 Air Force Falcons men's ice hockey season =

- Conference: T–2nd Atlantic Hockey
- Home ice: Cadet Ice Arena

Rankings
- USCHO.com: NR
- USA Today: NR

Record
- Overall: 20–12–5
- Conference: 16–7–5
- Home: 13–6–1
- Road: 7–5–4
- Neutral: 0–1–0

Coaches and captains
- Head coach: Frank Serratore
- Assistant coaches: Andy Berg; Joe Doyle
- Captain(s): Ben Carey; Max Hartner

The 2015–16 Air Force Falcons men's ice hockey season was the 48th season of play for the program and the 10th season in the Atlantic Hockey conference. The Falcons represented the United States Air Force Academy and were coached by Frank Serratore, in his 19th season.

== Departures ==
Player	Position	Nationality	Cause
Chad Demers	Forward	United States	Graduation (retired)
Connor Girard	Goaltender	United States	Transferred to Amherst
Cole Gunner	Forward	United States	Graduation (signed with EHC Klostersee)
Alex Halloran	Defenseman	United States	Graduation (retired)
Scott Holm	Forward	United States	Graduation (signed with Berlin River Drivers)
Michael McDonald	Defenseman	United States	Graduation (retired)
Matt Meier	Forward	United States	Returned to juniors (Omaha Lancers)
George Michalke III	Forward	United States	Graduation (retired)
Chris Truehl	Goaltender	United States	Transferred to Quinnipiac
Will Vosejpka	Forward	United States	Transferred to Amherst
Dan Weissenhofer	Defenseman	United States	Graduation (retired)

== Recruiting ==
Player	Position	Nationality	Age	Notes
Dan Bailey	Defenseman	United States	19	St. Cloud, MN
Billy Christopoulos	Goaltender	United States	21	Raleigh, NC
Jake Erickson	Defenseman	United States	20	Stillwater, MN
Evan Feno	Forward	United States	20	Morrison, CO
Evan Giesler	Forward	United States	21	Naperville, IL
Kyle Haak	Forward	United States	21	Okemos, MI
Matt Koch	Defenseman	United States	20	Hastings, MN
Evan Okeley	Forward	United States	20	Carmel, IN
Matt Perry	Forward	United States	20	Lakeville, MN
Matt Serratore	Forward	United States	21	Bemidji, MN
Shane Starrett	Goaltender	United States	21	Bellingham, MA
Zach Yoder	Defenseman	United States	21	Woodstock, GA

== Roster ==
No.	Nat.	Player	Class	Pos	Height	Weight	DoB	Hometown	Previous team	NHL rights
2	(United States)	Kyle Mackey	Sophomore	D	6' 1" (1.85 m)	174 lb (79 kg)	1994-10-07	Derby, New York	Youngstown Phantoms (USHL)	—
3	(United States)	Johnny Hrabovsky	Junior	D	6' 0" (1.83 m)	187 lb (85 kg)	1993-03-19	Hummelstown, Pennsylvania	Tri-City Storm (USHL)	—
4	(United States)	Phil Boje	Sophomore	D	5' 11" (1.8 m)	192 lb (87 kg)	1994-04-13	Shoreview, Minnesota	Dubuque Fighting Saints (USHL)	—
6	(United States)	Jake Erickson	Freshman	D	5' 9" (1.75 m)	181 lb (82 kg)	1994-11-03	Stillwater, Minnesota	Battlefords North Stars (SJHL)	—
7	(United States)	Matt Koch	Freshman	D	6' 1" (1.85 m)	194 lb (88 kg)	1995-03-22	Hastings, Minnesota	Wichita Falls Wildcats (NAHL)	—
8	(United States)	Max Hartner (C)	Senior	D	6' 0" (1.83 m)	205 lb (93 kg)	1991-09-30	Greenwood Village, Colorado	Green Bay Gamblers (USHL)	—
10	(United States)	Jordan Himley	Sophomore	F	5' 8" (1.73 m)	161 lb (73 kg)	1993-12-26	Mundelein, Illinois	Janesville Jets (NAHL)	—
11	(United States)	Zach Yoder	Freshman	D	6' 5" (1.96 m)	205 lb (93 kg)	1994-08-14	Woodstock, Georgia	Janesville Jets (NAHL)	—
12	(United States)	Matt Serratore	Freshman	F	5' 9" (1.75 m)	165 lb (75 kg)	1994-06-21	Bemidji, Minnesota	Penticton Vees (BCHL)	—
13	(United States)	Tyler Ledford	Sophomore	F	5' 9" (1.75 m)	161 lb (73 kg)	1994-04-29	Folsom, California	Wichita Falls Wildcats (NAHL)	—
14	(United States)	Ben Kucera	Sophomore	F	5' 7" (1.7 m)	185 lb (84 kg)	1995-04-23	Overland Park, Kansas	Wichita Falls Wildcats (NAHL)	—
15	(United States)	Evan Giesler	Freshman	F	6' 0" (1.83 m)	185 lb (84 kg)	1994-02-19	Naperville, Illinois	Bismarck Bobcats (BCHL)	—
16	(United States)	Kyle Haak	Freshman	F	6' 0" (1.83 m)	185 lb (84 kg)	1994-08-06	Okemos, Michigan	Aberdeen Wings (NAHL)	—
18	(United States)	Evan Feno	Freshman	F	5' 9" (1.75 m)	170 lb (77 kg)	1995-02-14	Morrison, Colorado	Janesville Jets (NAHL)	—
19	(United States)	Evan Okeley	Freshman	F	6' 0" (1.83 m)	185 lb (84 kg)	1995-05-03	Carmel, Indiana	Wichita Falls Wildcats (NAHL)	—
20	(United States)	Dan Bailey	Freshman	D	6' 1" (1.85 m)	174 lb (79 kg)	1996-03-21	St. Cloud, Minnesota	Wenatchee Wild (NAHL)	—
21	(United States)	Ryan Doucet	Junior	F	6' 3" (1.91 m)	209 lb (95 kg)	1992-10-11	San Jose, California	Jamestown Ironmen (NAHL)	—
22	(United States)	Matt Perry	Freshman	F	6' 0" (1.83 m)	185 lb (84 kg)	1995-03-08	Lakeville, Minnesota	Bismarck Bobcats (NAHL)	—
23	(United States)	Dylan Abood	Sophomore	D	5' 8" (1.73 m)	165 lb (75 kg)	1993-05-31	Centennial, Colorado	Rio Grande Valley Killer Bees (NAHL)	—
24	(United States)	A. J. Reid	Junior	F	5' 10" (1.78 m)	190 lb (86 kg)	1992-09-09	Lakeville, Minnesota	Austin Bruins (NAHL)	—
25	(United States)	Tyler Rostenkowski	Sophomore	D	5' 10" (1.78 m)	181 lb (82 kg)	1993-06-02	Chicago, Illinois	Amarillo Bulls (NAHL)	—
26	(United States)	Ben Carey (C)	Senior	F	5' 11" (1.8 m)	170 lb (77 kg)	1992-12-30	Centennial, Colorado	Wenatchee Wild (NAHL)	—
27	(United States)	Erik Baskin	Sophomore	F	6' 3" (1.91 m)	201 lb (91 kg)	1993-10-11	Minnetonka, Minnesota	Aberdeen Wings (NAHL)	—
33	(United States)	Chris Dylewski	Junior	G	5' 11" (1.8 m)	165 lb (75 kg)		Colorado Springs, Colorado	Tampa Bay Jr. Bolts (Independent)	—
40	(United States)	Shane Starrett	Freshman	G	6' 5" (1.96 m)	194 lb (88 kg)	1994-07-12	Bellingham, Massachusetts	South Shore Kings (USPHL)	—
44	(United States)	Billy Christopoulos	Freshman	G	6' 2" (1.88 m)	194 lb (88 kg)	1994-02-01	Raleigh, North Carolina	Alberni Valley Bulldogs (BCHL)	—
52	(United States)	Jonathan Kopacka	Sophomore	D	6' 1" (1.85 m)	185 lb (84 kg)	1993-05-28	Macomb, Michigan	Port Huron Fighting Falcons (NAHL)	—

== Standings ==
2015–16 Atlantic Hockey standings
	Conference record							Overall record					
	GP	W	L	T	PTS	GF	GA	GP	W	L	T	GF	GA
Robert Morris †	28	18	6	4	40	116	69	39	24	11	4	158	107
Air Force	28	16	7	5	37	85	60	37	20	12	5	110	86
Holy Cross	28	16	7	5	37	89	59	36	18	13	5	109	90
Mercyhurst	28	15	9	4	34	86	82	36	17	15	4	108	115
#20 RIT *	28	14	9	5	33	93	77	39	18	15	6	118	116
Army	28	8	11	9	25	64	74	38	14	15	9	88	89
Canisius	28	10	13	5	25	72	82	39	12	22	5	92	121
Bentley	28	9	13	6	24	74	85	40	14	20	6	106	124
Sacred Heart	28	10	15	3	23	72	78	37	13	20	4	96	109
Niagara	28	5	18	5	15	58	95	37	6	25	6	71	126
American International	28	6	19	3	15	57	105	39	7	29	3	80	159
Championship: March 19, 2016 † indicates conference regular season champion; * indicates conference tournament champion Final rankings: USCHO.com Top 20 Poll

== Schedule and results ==
Date	Time	Opponent^{#}	Rank^{#}	Site	TV	Decision	Result	Attendance	Record
Exhibition
October 5	6:05 PM	Calgary*		Cadet Ice Arena • Colorado Springs, Colorado		Christopoulos	W 5–0	1,159	
Regular Season
October 9	7:05 PM	#5 Denver*		Cadet Ice Arena • Colorado Springs, Colorado		Christopoulos	W 5–4 ^{OT}	2,542	1–0–0
October 10	7:06 PM	at #5 Denver*		Magness Arena • Denver, Colorado		Christopoulos	L 1–3	4,707	1–1–0
October 16	5:05 PM	at Robert Morris		Colonials Arena • Neville Township, Pennsylvania		Christopoulos	L 1–5	602	1–2–0 (0–1–0)
October 17	5:05 PM	at Robert Morris		Colonials Arena • Neville Township, Pennsylvania		Starrett	T 3–3 ^{OT}	417	1–2–1 (0–1–1)
October 23	6:37 PM	at #2 Omaha*		Cadet Ice Arena • Colorado Springs, Colorado	Altitude	Starrett	L 2–4	7,898	1–3–1
October 24	6:07 PM	at #2 Omaha*		Cadet Ice Arena • Colorado Springs, Colorado		Starrett	L 1–4	7,898	1–4–1
November 6	5:05 PM	at Mercyhurst		Mercyhurst Ice Center • Erie, Pennsylvania		Starrett	W 5–4 ^{OT}	649	2–4–1 (1–1–1)
November 7	5:05 PM	at Mercyhurst		Mercyhurst Ice Center • Erie, Pennsylvania		Starrett	L 1–3	1,059	2–5–1 (1–2–1)
November 12	7:05 PM	Holy Cross		Cadet Ice Arena • Colorado Springs, Colorado		Starrett	L 1–3	1,712	2–6–1 (1–3–1)
November 13	7:05 PM	Holy Cross		Cadet Ice Arena • Colorado Springs, Colorado		Starrett	W 5–1	2,278	3–6–1 (2–3–1)
November 20	5:05 PM	at Sacred Heart		Webster Bank Arena • Bridgeport, Connecticut		Starrett	T 1–1 ^{OT}	187	3–6–2 (2–3–2)
November 21	5:05 PM	at Sacred Heart		Webster Bank Arena • Bridgeport, Connecticut		Starrett	W 3–2	142	4–6–2 (3–3–2)
November 27	7:05 PM	Colorado College*		Cadet Ice Arena • Colorado Springs, Colorado (Rivalry)		Starrett	W 4–3	2,379	5–6–2
November 28	7:07 PM	at Colorado College*		Broadmoor World Arena • Colorado Springs, Colorado (Rivalry)		Starrett	L 3–4	6,672	5–7–2
December 4	5:05 PM	Canisius		Cadet Ice Arena • Colorado Springs, Colorado		Christopoulos	W 3–2	1,863	6–7–2 (4–3–2)
December 5	7:05 PM	Canisius		Cadet Ice Arena • Colorado Springs, Colorado		Starrett	L 2–4	1,703	6–8–2 (4–4–2)
January 2	7:05 PM	Bentley		Cadet Ice Arena • Colorado Springs, Colorado		Christopoulos	W 3–2	2,116	7–8–2 (5–4–2)
January 3	5:05 PM	Bentley		Cadet Ice Arena • Colorado Springs, Colorado		Starrett	L 3–5	1,397	7–9–2 (5–5–2)
January 8	7:05 PM	American International		Cadet Ice Arena • Colorado Springs, Colorado		Christopoulos	W 8–2	1,920	8–9–2 (6–5–2)
January 9	5:05 PM	American International		Cadet Ice Arena • Colorado Springs, Colorado		Starrett	W 5–1	1,792	9–9–2 (7–5–2)
January 15	5:05 PM	at Army		Tate Rink • West Point, New York (Rivalry)		Starrett	W 1–0	2,657	10–9–2 (8–5–2)
January 16	4:05 PM	at Army		Tate Rink • West Point, New York (Rivalry)		Starrett	T 1–1 ^{OT}	2,729	10–9–3 (8–5–3)
January 22	5:05 PM	Niagara		Cadet Ice Arena • Colorado Springs, Colorado		Starrett	W 3–0	1,931	11–9–3 (9–5–3)
January 23	3:05 PM	Niagara		Cadet Ice Arena • Colorado Springs, Colorado		Starrett	W 3–1	1,912	12–9–3 (10–5–3)
January 29	5:35 PM	at Canisius		LECOM Harborcenter • Buffalo, New York		Starrett	W 3–2	1,494	13–9–3 (11–5–3)
January 30	5:35 PM	at Canisius		LECOM Harborcenter • Buffalo, New York		Starrett	T 1–1 ^{OT}	1,571	13–9–4 (11–5–4)
February 5	7:05 PM	RIT		Cadet Ice Arena • Colorado Springs, Colorado		Starrett	T 2–2 ^{OT}	2,519	13–9–5 (11–5–5)
February 6	5:05 PM	RIT		Cadet Ice Arena • Colorado Springs, Colorado		Starrett	W 4–0	2,103	14–9–5 (12–5–5)
February 12	7:05 PM	at Holy Cross		Hart Center • Worcester, Massachusetts		Starrett	L 2–4	1,374	14–10–5 (12–6–5)
February 13	5:05 PM	at Holy Cross		Hart Center • Worcester, Massachusetts		Starrett	W 4–2	1,468	15–10–5 (13–6–5)
February 19	7:05 PM	Robert Morris		Cadet Ice Arena • Colorado Springs, Colorado		Christopoulos	L 4–7	2,394	15–11–5 (13–7–5)
February 20	5:05 PM	Robert Morris		Cadet Ice Arena • Colorado Springs, Colorado		Starrett	W 4–1	2,284	16–11–5 (14–7–5)
February 26	5:05 PM	at Niagara		Dwyer Arena • Lewiston, New York	TWCS	Starrett	W 6–1	615	17–11–5 (15–7–5)
February 27	5:05 PM	at Niagara		Dwyer Arena • Lewiston, New York		Starrett	W 3–0	982	18–11–5 (16–7–5)
Atlantic Hockey Tournament
March 11	7:05 PM	Canisius*		Cadet Ice Arena • Colorado Springs, Colorado (Quarterfinals Game 1)		Starrett	W 4–1	1,711	19–11–5
March 12	7:05 PM	Canisius*		Cadet Ice Arena • Colorado Springs, Colorado (Quarterfinals Game 2)		Starrett	W 4–1	1,843	20–11–5
March 18	7:10 PM	vs. RIT*		Blue Cross Arena • Rochester, New York (Semifinal)		Starrett	L 1–2 ^{OT}	3,347	20–12–5
*Non-conference game. ^{#}Rankings from USCHO.com Poll. All times are in Mountain Time. Source:

== Scoring statistics ==
Name	Position	Games	Goals	Assists	Points	PIM
Tyler Ledford	F	37	7	20	27	16
Ben Kucera	C	34	15	10	25	12
Ben Carey	F	37	12	13	25	8
Erik Baskin	F	35	12	12	24	27
Jordan Himley	F	37	8	14	22	10
Kyle Haak	F	36	9	10	19	10
Matt Serratore	F	36	10	8	18	12
Johnny Hrabovsky	D	36	7	8	15	6
Phil Boje	D	36	4	11	15	14
Evan Feno	F	35	4	8	12	10
Kyle Mackey	D	31	2	9	11	26
Evan Giesler	F	36	4	6	10	14
Jonathan Kopacka	D	32	0	10	10	16
Max Hartner	D	37	4	5	9	8
A. J. Reid	C/RW	22	2	7	9	22
Zach Yoder	D	29	1	8	9	30
Dylan Abood	D	33	2	6	8	12
Tyler Rostenkowski	D	31	5	2	7	16
Matt Koch	D	18	0	5	5	2
Evan Okeley	F	24	2	2	4	8
Dan Bailey	D	11	0	3	3	0
Shane Starrett	G	33	0	2	2	0
Ryan Doucet	LW	1	0	0	0	0
Chris Dylewski	G	2	0	0	0	0
Matt Perry	F	2	0	0	0	2
Billy Christopoulos	G	10	0	0	0	0
Bench	-	-	-	-	-	14
Total			110	179	289	239

== Goaltending statistics ==
Name	Games	Minutes	Wins	Losses	Ties	Goals Against	Saves	Shut Outs	SV %	GAA
Chris Dylewski	2	6:26	0	0	0	0	3	0	1.000	0.00
Shane Starrett	33	1781:55	16	9	5	57	689	4	.924	1.92
Billy Christopoulos	10	448:32	4	3	0	25	168	0	.870	3.34
Empty Net	-	26:20	-	-	-	4	-	-	-	-
Total	37	2263:13	20	12	5	86	946	4	.909	2.28

== Rankings ==
Poll	Week																								
Poll	Pre	1	2	3	4	5	6	7	8	9	10	11	12	13	14	15	16	17	18	19	20	21	22	23	24 (Final)
USCHO.com	NR	NR	NR	NR	NR	NR	NR	NR	NR	NR	NR	NR	NR	NR	NR	NR	NR	NR	NR	NR	NR	NR	NR	-	NR
USA Today	NR	NR	NR	NR	NR	NR	NR	NR	NR	NR	NR	NR	NR	NR	NR	NR	NR	NR	NR	NR	NR	NR	NR	NR	NR

USCHO did not release a poll in Week 23.

== Awards and honors ==
Player	Award	Ref
Ben Carey	Atlantic Hockey Best Defensive Forward	
Ben Carey	Atlantic Hockey Individual Sportsmanship Award	
Shane Starrett	Atlantic Hockey Regular Season Goaltending Award	
Frank Serratore	Atlantic Hockey Coach of the Year	
Shane Starrett	All-Atlantic Hockey First Team	
Johnny Hrabovsky	All-Atlantic Hockey Second Team	
Shane Starrett	All-Atlantic Hockey Rookie Team	
Matt Serratore	All-Atlantic Hockey Rookie Team	
