= 2016 Atlantic Hockey men's ice hockey tournament =

2016 Atlantic Hockey Men's ice hockey tournament
- Dates: March 4–19, 2016
- Teams: 11
- Finals site: Blue Cross Arena; Rochester, New York
- Champions: RIT (3rd title)
- Winning coach: Wayne Wilson (3rd title)
- MVP: Myles Powell (RIT)
- Atlantic Hockey Men's Ice Hockey Tournaments

The 2016 Atlantic Hockey Tournament is the 12th Atlantic Hockey Tournament. It will be played between March 4 and March 19, 2016, at campus locations and at the Blue Cross Arena in Rochester, New York. By winning the tournament, RIT earned Atlantic Hockey's automatic bid to the 2016 NCAA Division I Men's Ice Hockey Tournament.

== Format ==
The tournament features four rounds of play. In the first round the sixth and eleventh, seventh and tenth, and eighth and ninth seeds, as determined by the conference regular season standings, will play a best-of-three series with the winners advancing to the quarterfinals. The top five teams from the conference regular season standings receive a bye to the quarterfinals. There, the first seed and lowest-ranked first round winner, the second seed and second-highest-ranked first round winner, the third seed and highest-ranked first round winner, and the fourth seed and the fifth seed will play a best-of-three series, with the winners advancing to the semifinals. In the semifinals, the highest and lowest seeds and second-highest and second-lowest remaining seeds will play a single game each, with the winners advancing to the championship game. The tournament champion will receive an automatic bid to the 2015 NCAA Division I Men's Ice Hockey Tournament.

=== Standings ===
Note: GP = Games played; W = Wins; L = Losses; T = Ties; PTS = Points; GF = Goals For; GA = Goals Against

2015–16 Atlantic Hockey standings
| | Conference record | | | | | | | Overall record | | | | | |
| | GP | W | L | T | PTS | GF | GA | GP | W | L | T | GF | GA |
|---|---|---|---|---|---|---|---|---|---|---|---|---|---|
| Robert Morris † | 28 | 18 | 6 | 4 | 40 | 116 | 69 | 39 | 24 | 11 | 4 | 158 | 107 |
| Air Force | 28 | 16 | 7 | 5 | 37 | 85 | 60 | 37 | 20 | 12 | 5 | 110 | 86 |
| Holy Cross | 28 | 16 | 7 | 5 | 37 | 89 | 59 | 36 | 18 | 13 | 5 | 109 | 90 |
| Mercyhurst | 28 | 15 | 9 | 4 | 34 | 86 | 82 | 36 | 17 | 15 | 4 | 108 | 115 |
| #20 RIT * | 28 | 14 | 9 | 5 | 33 | 93 | 77 | 39 | 18 | 15 | 6 | 118 | 116 |
| Army | 28 | 8 | 11 | 9 | 25 | 64 | 74 | 38 | 14 | 15 | 9 | 88 | 89 |
| Canisius | 28 | 10 | 13 | 5 | 25 | 72 | 82 | 39 | 12 | 22 | 5 | 92 | 121 |
| Bentley | 28 | 9 | 13 | 6 | 24 | 74 | 85 | 40 | 14 | 20 | 6 | 106 | 124 |
| Sacred Heart | 28 | 10 | 15 | 3 | 23 | 72 | 78 | 37 | 13 | 20 | 4 | 96 | 109 |
| Niagara | 28 | 5 | 18 | 5 | 15 | 58 | 95 | 37 | 6 | 25 | 6 | 71 | 126 |
| American International | 28 | 6 | 19 | 3 | 15 | 57 | 105 | 39 | 7 | 29 | 3 | 80 | 159 |
Championship: March 19, 2016 † indicates conference regular season champion; * indicates conference tournament champion Final rankings: USCHO.com Top 20 Poll

== Bracket ==
Air Force and Holy Cross finished tied for second place; Air Force is the second seed based on the third tiebreaker (head-to-head goal differential). Army and Canisius finished tied for sixth place; Army is the sixth seed based on the first tiebreaker (head-to-head results). Niagara and American International finished tied for tenth place; Niagara is the tenth seed based on the first tiebreaker.

First round March 4–6
6 | Army | 5 | 2 | 4
11 | American International | 0 | 3* | 0
7 | Canisius | 2 | 1 | 4
10 | Niagara | 3 | 0 | 1
8 | Bentley | 5 | 1 | 4
9 | Sacred Heart | 4 | 2* | 1

Quarterfinals; March 11–13
1 | Robert Morris | 3 | 4 | 6
8 | Bentley | 4 | 1 | 3
2 | Air Force | 4 | 4 | —
7 | Canisius | 1 | 1 | —
3 | Holy Cross | 0 | 1 | —
6 | Army | 3 | 2 | —
4 | Mercyhurst | 1 | 1 | —
5 | RIT | 2 | 4 | —

Semifinals; March 18
1 | Robert Morris | 2*
6 | Army | 1
2 | Air Force | 1
5 | RIT | 2*

Championship; March 19
1 | Robert Morris | 4
5 | RIT | 7

Note: * denotes overtime period(s)

== Results ==
=== First round ===
==== (6) Army vs. (11) American International ====
| March 4 | Army | 5 – 0 | American International | Tate Rink | Recap |
| (Roberts) Ian Mansfield - GW - 14:45 | | First period | No scoring |
| (Shecter) Ian Mansfield - 06:02 (Hearn) Josh Roberts - 14:48 | | Second period | No scoring |
| (Andrle) Tyler Pham - 02:21 (Mansfield, Roberts) Shane Hearn - 02:53 | | Third period | No scoring |
| ( 31 saves / 31 shots ) Parker Gahagen | | Goalie stats | Alex Murray ( 25 saves / 30 shots ) |

| March 5 | Army | 2 – 3 | OT | American International | Tate Rink | Recap |
| (Kozlak) Ryan Nick - 19:00 | | First period | | No scoring |
| (Nick) Conor Andrle - 06:40 | | Second period | | 14:17 - PP - Austin Orszulak (Debrincat, Porter) |
| No scoring | | Third period | | 01:42 - PP - Johno May (Mueller, Murray) |
| No scoring | | First overtime period | | 00:30 - GW - Bryant Christian (Mueller, Orszulak) |
| ( 21 saves / 24 shots ) Parker Gahagen | | Goalie stats | | Alex Murray ( 34 saves / 36 shots ) |

| March 6 | Army | 4 – 0 | American International | Tate Rink | Recap |
| (Andrle, Pham) Christian Pomarico - GW - 01:36 (Carlisle) Taylor Maruya - 15:39 (Pham, Worden) Conor Andrle - 16:02 | | First period | No scoring |
| No scoring | | Second period | No scoring |
| (Maruya, Carlisle) Joe Kozlak - 18:01 | | Third period | No scoring |
| ( 19 saves / 19 shots ) Parker Gahagen | | Goalie stats | Alex Murray ( 36 saves / 40 shots ) |

| Army won series 2–1 |

==== (7) Canisius vs. (10) Niagara ====
| March 4 | Air Force | 2 – 3 | Niagara | Harborcenter | Recap |
| (Conacher, Cuddemi) Cameron Heath - 03:28 | | First period | 03:40 - Sam Rennaker (Plouffe); 03:40 - Albin Karlsson (Smith, Edwards) |
| (Conacher, Schmelzer) Dylan McLaughlin - PP - 12:37 | | Second period | 08:49 - GW - Stanislav Dzakhov (Kolenda) |
| No scoring | | Third period | No scoring |
| ( 14 saves / 17 shots ) Simon Hofley | | Goalie stats | Jackson Teichroeb ( 31 saves / 33 shots ) |

| March 5 | Air Force | 1 – 0 | Niagara | Harborcenter | Recap |
| No Scoring | | First period | No scoring |
| (Chamberland, Sheeran) Dylan McLaughlin - GW - 12:42 | | Second period | No scoring |
| No scoring | | Third period | No scoring |
| ( 33 saves / 33 shots ) Simon Hofley | | Goalie stats | Jackson Teichroeb ( 30 saves / 31 shots ) |

| March 6 | Air Force | 4 – 1 | Niagara | Harborcenter | Recap |
| No Scoring | | First period | No scoring |
| (Conacher, Mazza) Mike Sabatini - 10:50 (Schmelzer, Mazza) Shane Conacher - GW PP - 12:55 | | Second period | No scoring |
| (Cuddemi, Conacher) Cameron Heath - 07:19 (Murray) David Parrottino - EN - 17:24 | | Third period | 16:51 - EA - Johnny Curran (Dzakhov, Kovachis) |
| ( 37 saves / 38 shots ) Simon Hofley | | Goalie stats | Jackson Teichroeb ( 21 saves / 24 shots ) |

| Canisius won series 2–1 |

==== (8) Bentley vs. (9) Sacred Heart ====
| March 4 | Bentley | 5 – 4 | Sacred Heart | John A. Ryan Arena | Recap |
| (Gladiuk, Schmidt) Max French - 16:39 | | First period | No scoring |
| (Schmidt, Gladiuk) Max French - PP - 07:48 (Reardon, Deresky) Derek Bacon - 10:05 | | Second period | 14:17 - Zach Luczyk (Clare, Butcher); 19:10 - PP - Zach Luczyk (Nylen, Danforth); 19:46 - PP - Justin Danforth (Jasper, Luczyk) |
| (Reardon, Donners) Derek Bacon - 02:26 (Reardon, Deresky) Derek Bacon - GW - 06:48 | | Third period | 18:16 - EA - Justin Danforth (Minello) |
| ( 26 saves / 30 shots ) Gabe Antoni | | Goalie stats | Brett Magnus ( 26 saves / 31 shots ) |

| March 5 | Bentley | 1 – 2 | OT | Sacred Heart | John A. Ryan Arena | Recap |
| No Scoring | | First period | | No scoring |
| (Jago, Reardon) Tyler Deresky - 10:41 | | Second period | | No scoring |
| No scoring | | Third period | | 12:39 - PP - Connor Doherty (Clare, Nylen) |
| No scoring | | First overtime period | | 13:06 - GW - Justin Danforth (Minello, Jasper) |
| ( 37 saves / 39 shots ) Gabe Antoni | | Goalie stats | | Brett Magnus ( 36 saves / 37 shots ) |

| March 6 | Bentley | 4 – 1 | Sacred Heart | John A. Ryan Arena | Recap |
| (Gladiuk, Schmidt) Max French - 05:27 | | First period | No scoring |
| (Gladiuk, French) Tanner Jago - GW PP - 11:23 | | Second period | 17:07 - PP - Jordan Minello (Jasper, Danforth) |
| (Gladiuk) Kyle Schmidt - 18:34 (Gladiuk) Kyle Schmidt - EN - 19:34 | | Third period | No scoring |
| ( 27 saves / 28 shots ) Gabe Antoni | | Goalie stats | Brett Magnus ( 24 saves / 27 shots ) |

| Bentley won series 2–1 |

=== Quarterfinals ===
==== (1) Robert Morris vs. (8) Bentley ====
| March 11 | Robert Morris | 3 – 4 | Bentley | 84 Lumber Arena | Recap |
| (Moore, Cope) Zac Lynch - SH - 06:16 | | First period | 08:05 - Matt Blomquist (Schmidt, Gladiuk); 17:50 - PP - Max French (Jago, Schmidt) |
| (Ferguson, Leavens) Timmy Moore - 11:23 | | Second period | 16:18 - Andrew Gladiuk (Schmidt, Jago) |
| (Wilson, Israel) Matt Cope - 14:11 | | Third period | 14:49 - GW - Max French (Blomquist, Gladiuk) |
| ( 24 saves / 28 shots ) Terry Shafer | | Goalie stats | Gabe Antoni ( 45 saves / 48 shots ) |

| March 12 | Robert Morris | 4 – 1 | Bentley | 84 Lumber Arena | Recap |
| (Moore, Lynch) Brady Ferguson - 02:14 | | First period | No scoring |
| (Moore, Leavens) Brady Ferguson - GW - 06:38 (French, Ahlgren) Cody DePourcq - 09:56 (unassisted) Timmy Moore - 16:47 | | Second period | 15:24 - Brandon Denham (Friedmann) |
| No scoring | | Third period | No scoring |
| ( 22 saves / 23 shots ) Terry Shafer | | Goalie stats | Gabe Antoni ( 33 saves / 37 shots ) / Jayson Argue ( 8 saves / 8 shots ) |

| March 13 | Robert Morris | 6 – 3 | Bentley | 84 Lumber Arena | Recap |
| No Scoring | | First period | 08:51 - Matt Blomquist (Reardon, Deresky) |
| (Ferguson, Friedmann) Daniel Leavens - 07:38 (Ferguson) Daniel Leavens - 09:33 (Denham, Gibson) David Friedmann - 12:34 (Wilson, Denham) David Friedmann - GW - 14:14 (Gibson, Wilson) Zac Lynch - PP - 17:51 | | Second period | No scoring |
| (Friedmann, Ferguson) Chase Golightly - 17:27 | | Third period | 07:58 - PP - Michael Reardon (Bacon); 19:59 - Tyler Deresky (Eiserman, Bacon) |
| ( 31 saves / 34 shots ) Terry Shafer | | Goalie stats | Gabe Antoni ( 22 saves / 26 shots ) / Jayson Argue ( 9 saves / 11 shots ) |

| Robert Morris won series 2–1 |

==== (2) Air Force vs. (7) Canisius ====
| March 11 | Air Force | 4 – 1 | Canisius | Cadet Ice Arena | Recap |
| (Hartner, Himley) Ben Carey - 05:32 | | First period | No scoring |
| (Carey, Haak) Evan Giesler - GW - 07:21 (Hrabovsky) Kyle Haak - 10:38 (Haak, Abood) Evan Giesler - 15:54 | | Second period | No scoring |
| No scoring | | Third period | 01:41 - PP - Ralph Cuddemi (Conacher, Mazza) |
| ( 22 saves / 23 shots ) Shane Starrett | | Goalie stats | Simon Hofley ( 33 saves / 37 shots ) |

| March 12 | Air Force | 4 – 1 | Canisius | Cadet Ice Arena | Recap |
| (Kucera, Starrett) Tyler Ledford - 04:52 | | First period | No scoring |
| (Boje) Ben Carey - GW SH - 00:29 (Ledford, Abood) Ben Kucera - 06:56 | | Second period | No scoring |
| (Serratore, Koch) Kyle Haak - EN - 17:55 | | Third period | 08:49 - Ryan Schmelzer (Cuddemi, Heath) |
| ( 23 saves / 24 shots ) Shane Starrett / ( 1 saves / 1 shots ) Chris Dylewski | | Goalie stats | Simon Hofley ( 24 saves / 27 shots ) |

| Air Force won series 2–0 |

==== (3) Holy Cross vs. (6) Army ====
| March 11 | Holy Cross | 0 – 3 | Army | Hart Center | Recap |
| No Scoring | | First period | No scoring |
| No scoring | | Second period | 05:49 - GW - Trevor Fidler (Pham, Nick) |
| No scoring | | Third period | 07:46 - Conor Andrle (Nick, Pham); 08:56 - Josh Roberts (Mansfield, Hearn) |
| ( 27 saves / 30 shots ) Paul Berrafato | | Goalie stats | Parker Gahagen ( 31 saves / 31 shots ) |

| March 12 | Holy Cross | 1 – 2 | Army | Hart Center | Recap |
| No Scoring | | First period | No scoring |
| (Lubanski, Pooley) Castan Sommer - 01:41 | | Second period | 07:51 - SH - Taylor Maruya (Pham) |
| (Carlisle, Mansfield) Ryan Nick - GW - 05:52 | | Third period | No scoring |
| ( 18 saves / 20 shots ) Paul Berrafato | | Goalie stats | Parker Gahagen ( 36 saves / 37 shots ) |

| Army won series 2–0 |

==== (4) Mercyhurst vs. (5) RIT ====
| March 11 | Mercyhurst | 2 – 3 | RIT | Mercyhurst Ice Center | Recap |
| No Scoring | | First period | No scoring |
| No scoring | | Second period | 18:33 - Liam Kerins (Brown, Amlong) |
| (unassisted) Anthony Mastrodicasa - PP - 10:02 | | Third period | 15:52 - GW - Liam Kerins (unassisted) |
| ( 29 saves / 31 shots ) Adam Carlson | | Goalie stats | Mike Rotolo ( 21 saves / 22 shots ) |

| March 14 | Mercyhurst | 1 – 4 | RIT | Mercyhurst Ice Center | Recap |
| No Scoring | | First period | No scoring |
| No scoring | | Second period | 02:30 - PP - Chase Norrish (Mitchell, Valenzuela); 18:08 - GW PP - Gregory Amlong (Mitchell, Kerins) |
| (Barach) Jonathan Charbonneau - EA - 17:26 | | Third period | 02:36 - GW - Andrew Miller (Perron-Fontaine); 12:49 - PP - Erik Brown (unassisted) |
| ( 31 saves / 35 shots ) Brandon Wildung | | Goalie stats | Mike Rotolo ( 31 saves / 32 shots ) |

| RIT won series 2–0 |

=== Semifinals ===
==== (1) Robert Morris vs. (6) Army ====
| March 20 | Robert Morris | 2 – 1 | OT | Army | Blue Cross Arena | Recap |
| No Scoring | | First period | | 18:29 - PP - Clint Carlisle (Reuschlein, Reuschlein) |
| (Gibson, Lynch) Eric Israel - PP - 13:24 | | Second period | | No scoring |
| No scoring | | Third period | | No scoring |
| (Friedmann, Moore) Zac Lynch - GW - 12:44 | | First overtime period | | No scoring |
| ( 39 saves / 40 shots ) Terry Shafer | | Goalie stats | | Parker Gahagen ( 34 saves / 36 shots ) |

==== (2) Air Force vs. (5) RIT ====
| March 20 | Air Force | 1 – 2 | OT | RIT | Blue Cross Arena | Recap |
| No Scoring | | First period | | No scoring |
| (Koch) Evan Feno - 12:03 | | Second period | | No scoring |
| No scoring | | Third period | | 17:06 - Andrew Miller (unassisted) |
| No scoring | | First overtime period | | 12:18 - GW - Myles Powell (Mitchell, Smith) |
| ( 31 saves / 33 shots ) Shane Starrett | | Goalie stats | | Mike Rotolo ( 36 saves / 37 shots ) |

=== Championship ===
==== (1) Robert Morris vs. (5) RIT ====
| March 19 | Robert Morris | 4 – 7 | RIT | Blue Cross Arena | Recap |
| (Cope) Greg Gibson - 01:23 (Golightly, Ferguson) David Friedmann - PP - 10:10 | | First period | 04:59 - Liam Kerins (Skirving, Brown); 07:32 - PP - Gregory Amlong (Powell, Skirving); 15:06 - Liam Kerins (Valenzuela, Brown) |
| (Friedmann, Dorowicz) Brandon Denham - 14:44 | | Second period | 08:35 - Danny Smith (Powell, Kuqali); 16:48 - GW - Myles Powell (Mitchell, Smith) |
| (Friedmann, Lynch) Matt Cope - PP - 13:02 | | Third period | 09:53 - PP - Myles Powell (Skirving, Miller); 16:28 - PP - Gabe Valenzuela (Kuqali, Amlong) |
| ( 22 saves / 29 shots ) Terry Shafer | | Goalie stats | Mike Rotolo ( 30 saves / 34 shots ) |

== Tournament awards ==
=== All-Tournament Team ===
- G Mike Rotolo (RIT)
- D Chase Norrish (RIT)
- D Alexander Kuqali (RIT)
- F Myles Powell* (RIT)
- F Liam Kerins (RIT)
- F David Friedmann (Robert Morris)

* Most Valuable Player(s)
