= 1985 NCAA Division III men's ice hockey tournament =

- Teams: 8
- Finals site: Achilles Rink, Schenectady, New York
- Champions: RIT Tigers (1st title)
- Runner-up: Bemidji State Beavers (1st title game)
- Semifinalists: Plattsburgh State Cardinals (1st Frozen Four); Union Dutchmen (2nd Frozen Four)
- Winning coach: Bruce Delventhal (1st title)
- MOP: Chet Hallice (RIT)
- Attendance: 14,557

The 1985 NCAA Division III Men's Ice Hockey Tournament was the culmination of the 1984–85 NCAA Division III men's ice hockey season, the 2nd such tournament in NCAA history. It concluded with RIT defeating Bemidji State 5-1. All Quarterfinals matchups were held at home team venues, while all succeeding games were played in Schenectady, New York.

== Qualifying teams ==
Because neither of the two western conferences held a conference tournament the NCAA had all western schools play collectively in the Western Intercollegiate Hockey Association. At the conclusion of the regular season the top 8 teams, regardless of their conference, were invited to play in the WIHA Tournament. Though the tournament was arranged by the NCAA it is not considered as part of the NCAA tournament and is displayed here for reference. As a result of both the MIAC and NCHA beginning conference playoffs the following year the WIHA was dissolved.

=== WIHA Tournament ===
Regional Quarterfinals; March 1–3
Bemidji State	5	5
St. Scholastica	5	1
Gustavus Adolphus	5	6
Saint Mary's	4	3
Mankato State	9	6
Wisconsin–River Falls	0	2
St. Thomas	6	3
Lake Forest	1	1

Regional semifinals March 4
Bemidji State	4
Gustavus Adolphus	2
Mankato State	1
St. Thomas	4

Regional Final; March 10
Bemidji State	4
St. Thomas	1
Third place
Mankato State	6
Gustavus Adolphus	5

=== NCAA Qualifiers ===
The following teams qualified for the tournament. There were no automatic bids, however, conference tournament champions were given preferential consideration. No formal seeding was used while quarterfinal matches were arranged so that the road teams would have the shortest possible travel distances.

East						West					
School	Conference	Record	Berth Type	Appearance	Last Bid	School	Conference	Record	Berth Type	Appearance	Last Bid
Babson	ECAC East	21–8–0	At-Large	2nd	1984	Bemidji State	NCHA	25–4–2	WIHA Champion	1st	Never
Plattsburgh State	ECAC West	24–9–0	At-Large	1st	Never	Mankato State	NCHA	18–11–4	WIHA Third Place	1st	Never
RIT	ECAC West	22–6–1	At-Large	2nd	1984	St. Thomas	MIAC	25–5–0	WIHA Runner-Up	2nd	1984
Salem State	ECAC East	24–7–0	Tournament Champion	1st	Never						
Union	ECAC West	20–7–0	Tournament Champion	2nd	1984						

== Format ==
The tournament featured three rounds of play. In the Quarterfinals, teams played two-game aggregate series to determine which school advanced to the semifinals. Beginning with the semifinals all games became Single-game eliminations. The winning teams in the semifinals advanced to the National Championship Game with the losers playing in a Third Place game. The teams were seeded according to geographic proximity in the quarterfinals so the visiting team would have the shortest feasible distance to travel.

== Tournament bracket ==
Quarterfinals; March 15–17
Union	5	2	7
Babson	1	3	4
RIT	5	5	10
St. Thomas	4	2	6
Plattsburgh State	6	4	10
Salem State	1	2	3
Mankato State	4	2	6
Bemidji State	2	9	11

Semifinals; March 22
Union	2
RIT	3
Plattsburgh State	7
Bemidji State	8***

National championship March 23
RIT	5
Bemidji State	1
Third-place game
Union	9
Plattsburgh State	6

Note: * denotes overtime period(s)

== All-Tournament team ==
- G: Chet Hallice* (RIT)
- D: John Hawkins (RIT)
- D: Dave Geatz (Babson)
- F: Bobby Trowell (RIT)
- F: Peter DeArmas (Plattsburgh State)
- F: Jamie Knight (Union)

* Most Outstanding Player(s)

== Record by conference ==
Conference	# of Bids	Record	Win %	Frozen Four	Championship Game	Champions
ECAC West	3	8–4	.667	3	1	1
NCHA	2	3–3	.500	1	1	-
ECAC East	2	1–3	.250	-	-	-
MIAC	1	0–2	.000	-	-	-
