= Bruce Delventhal =

American ice hockey player, coach, and administrator

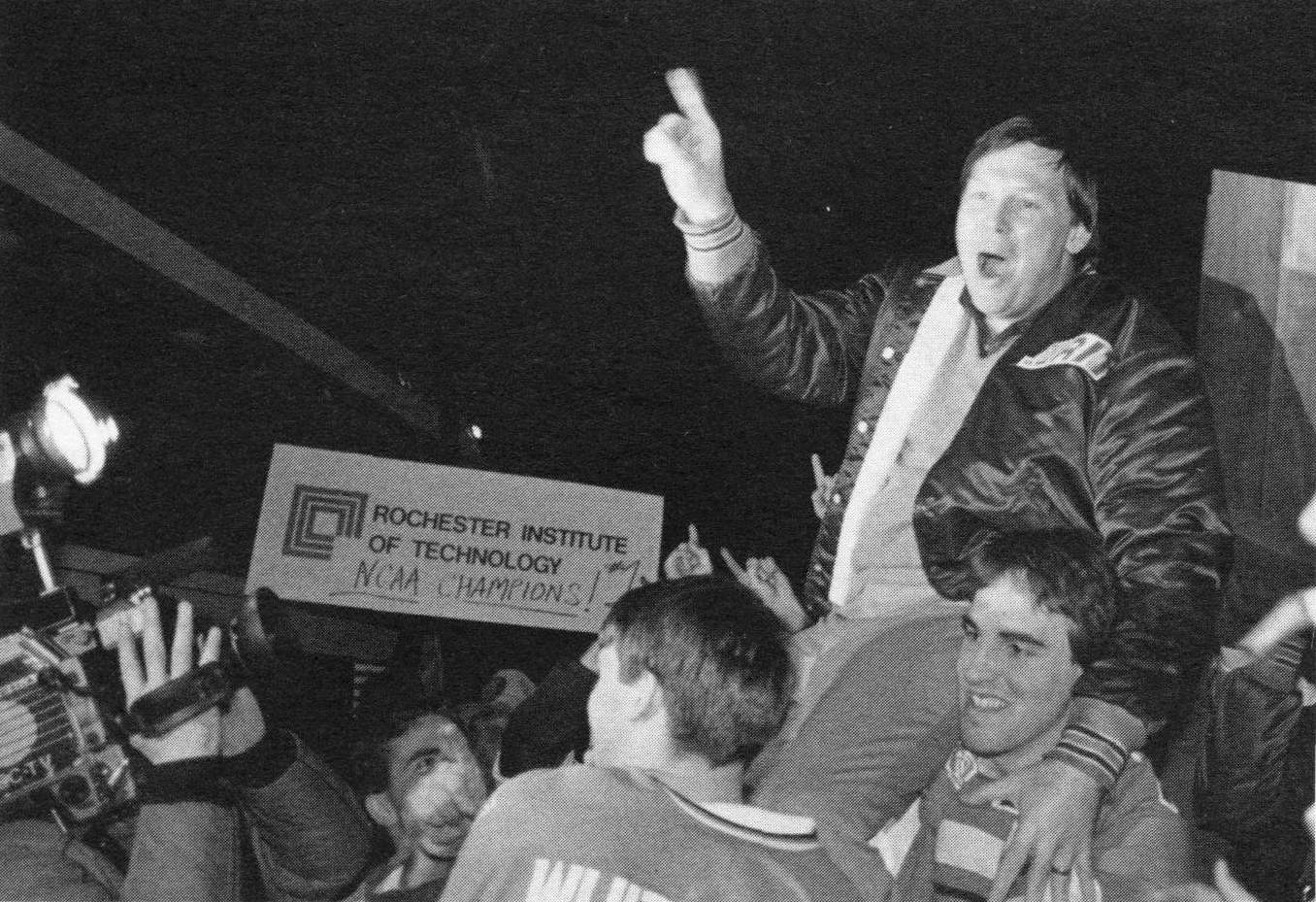
- Delventhal is carried by RIT players after they won the national championship in 1985.

Biographical details
- Born: Englewood, New Jersey, U.S.
- Education: Hamilton College

Playing career
- 1965–1968: Hamilton
- Position: Defenseman

Coaching career (HC unless noted)
- 1981–1983: Princeton (asst.)
- 1984–1988: RIT
- 1988–1996: Union

Administrative career (AD unless noted)
- 2005–2016: Plattsburgh State

Head coaching record
- Overall: 176–150–23 (.537)
- Tournaments: 7–3 (.700)

Accomplishments and honors

Championships
- 1985 ECAC West Champion; 1985 NCAA National Champion (D-III); 1986 ECAC West Champion; 1986 ECAC West Tournament Champion

Awards
- 1994 ECAC Coach of the Year; 2015 John "Snooks" Kelly Founders Award

Bruce Delventhal is an American retired ice hockey player, coach and administrator who led two ice hockey programs before becoming the athletic director for Plattsburgh State.

== Career ==
Born in Englewood, New Jersey, Delventhal is a graduate of Hamilton College. earned a Masters from Princeton Seminary and became an assistant coach for the Tigers ice hockey team. In 1984 Delventhal became the head coach for RIT and led the team to its first Division III national title the same year. After finishing third in the national with a school record 31 wins the following year the Tigers declined to middling records over the proceeding two years before Delventhal left to take over at Union.

In his first three seasons with the Skating Dutchmen Delventhal got the team to produce records well above .600 and reached the NCAA tournament in 1989. In 1991 Union was accepted into ECAC Hockey and promoted their ice hockey team to Division I. As a result of playing much more talented teams the Dutchmen's record dropped to 3–21–2 in 1991–92 but by their third season in the top echelon Union produced a winning record and Delventhal was named the ECAC Coach of the Year for his efforts. The Dutchmen declined to sub-.500 records for the next two years and Delventhal left the program in 1996.

With his coaching career over Delventhal spent eight years as the North American sales manager for fishing companies Yo-Zuri and Seaguar. In 2005 he was named as the athletic director for Plattsburgh State and remained with the school until his retirement in 2016. During his time as AD he was responsible for the $2.1 million of the Stafford Ice Arena and founding the Friends of Plattsburgh State Athletics, a fundraiser for the department. At the time of his retirement Delventhal had been the Secretary/Treasurer for the AHCA since 1988 and a board member of Hockey Coaches Care, an NCO.

== College head coaching record ==
Record table
Season	Team	Overall	Conference	Standing	Postseason
RIT Tigers (ECAC 2) (1984–1985)
1984–85	RIT	26–6–1	20–2–0	1st	NCAA National Champion
RIT Tigers (ECAC West) (1985–1988)
1985–86	RIT	31–6–0	22–3–0	1st	NCAA Consolation Game (Win)
1986–87	RIT	16–12–0	10–3–0		ECAC West Quarterfinals
1987–88	RIT	14–15–1	8–6–1		ECAC West Semifinals
RIT:		87–39–2	60–14–1		
Union Skating Dutchmen (ECAC West) (1988–1991)
1988–89	Union	19–8–2	16–6–1	4th	NCAA Quarterfinals
1989–90	Union	16–8–3	14–5–3	5th	ECAC West Quarterfinals
1990–91	Union	17–6–3	16–4–3	4th	ECAC West Quarterfinals
Union:		52–22–8	46–15–7		
Union Skating Dutchmen (ECAC Hockey) (1991–1996)
1991–92	Union	3–21–1	2–19–1	12th	
1992–93	Union	3–22–0	3–19–0	12th	
1993–94	Union	15–11–4	10–9–3	6th	ECAC Quarterfinals
1994–95	Union	9–16–4	6–12–4	T–10th	ECAC Preliminary
1995–96	Union	7–19–4	4–15–3	11th	
Union:		37–89–13	25–74–11		
Total:		176–150–23			
National champion Postseason invitational champion Conference regular season champion Conference regular season and conference tournament champion Division regular season champion Division regular season and conference tournament champion Conference tournament champion

† Lowell was a provisional member of ECAC Hockey and only played a non-conference schedule.

Awards and achievements
Preceded by Roger Demment	ECAC Coach of the Year; 1993–94	Succeeded by Bob Gaudet
