= Brian Mason (ice hockey) =

Canadian ice hockey coach (born 1950)

Biographical details
- Born: September 5, 1950 (age 76); Halifax, Nova Scotia, Canada
- Education: Clarkson

Playing career
- 1967–1968: Ottawa 67's
- 1968–1969: Hull Beavers
- 1970-73: Clarkson
- 1973-76: Dayton Gems
- Position: Center

Coaching career (HC unless noted)
- 1978–1980: Rensselaer (assistant)
- 1980–1984: RIT
- 1984–1990: Dartmouth

Head coaching record
- Overall: 122-143-9 (.462)

Accomplishments and honors

Championships
- 1982-83 National Championship; 1983-84 ECAC West Tournament

Brian Mason (born September 5, 1950) is a Canadian retired ice hockey coach who led RIT to their first national championship in 1983.

== Career ==
Brian Mason debuted in college hockey in 1970 with the powerhouse Clarkson Golden Knights led by legendary coach Len Ceglarski. Clarkson had finished up as the tournament runner-up the year before and despite a second-place finish in the 1971 tournament the Golden Knights were passed over in favor of regular season champion Boston University. While Mason would lead the team in scoring for the next two seasons Clarkson was unable to get close to another tournament berth during his time there. Mason went on to a brief professional career with the IHL's Dayton Gems before hanging up his skates in 1975–76 season.

By 1978 Mason was back in college, this time behind the bench at Rensselaer as an assistant. After only two years he was given the opportunity to be a head coach at Division II RIT. In his four years there Mason's squads never had a losing season and won more games every season, growing from 14 in his first year to 29 in his last. He also brought RIT their first national title in 1982-83 and their first ECAC West tournament title the year after. On April 6, 1984 Dartmouth announced that Mason would be replacing George Crowe as head coach.

Mason was taking over a declining program in Hanover that had seen some success in previous years but the recent returns hadn't been good. His first two seasons with the Big Green saw modest improvements to 5- and 7-win seasons but a 2-22-1 mark in his third year was the worst the program had ever recorded. A significant jump to 10 wins the next year began to erode immediately thereafter and ended with only four victories in 1989-90, leading to Mason's dismissal from the team. In his six-year tenure the Big Green never had a winning season and missed the ECAC tournament every time. The only saving grace for Mason is that the year after he left his replacement Ben Smith beat Mason's record for the worst season in Dartmouth history with a 1-24-3 finish.

== Career statistics ==
			Regular season					Playoffs
Season	Team	League	GP	G	A	Pts	PIM	GP	G	A	Pts	PIM
1967–68	Ottawa 67's	OHA	3	0	0	0	0	—	—	—	—	—
1968–69	Hull Beavers	CJHL	59	21	33	54	104	—	—	—	—	—
1970–71	Clarkson	ECAC	32	16	22	38	66	—	—	—	—	—
1971–72	Clarkson	ECAC	30	16	34	50	50	—	—	—	—	—
1972–73	Clarkson	ECAC	32	14	36	50	81	—	—	—	—	—
1973–74	Dayton Gems	IHL	72	22	34	56	68	4	3	3	6	5
1974–75	Dayton Gems	IHL	71	13	32	45	114	8	0	2	2	25
1975–76	Dayton Gems	IHL	5	0	1	1	2	—	—	—	—	—
NCAA totals			94	46	92	138	197	—	—	—	—	—
IHL totals			148	35	67	102	184	12	3	5	8	30

== Head coaching record ==
Record table
Season	Team	Overall	Conference	Standing	Postseason
RIT Tigers (ECAC 2) (1980–1984)
1980-81	RIT	14-10-0	6-8-0	T–17th	
1981-82	RIT	20-10-1	16-7-1	6th	ECAC 2 West Semifinals
1982-83	RIT	23-9-0	20-4-0	2nd	NCAA National Champion
1983-84	RIT	29-6-0	22-2-0	1st	NCAA Frozen Four
RIT:		86-35-1			
Dartmouth Big Green (ECAC Hockey) (1984–1990)
1984-85	Dartmouth	5-18-1	3-17-1	11th	
1985-86	Dartmouth	7-18-0	4-17-0	10th	
1986-87	Dartmouth	2-22-1	2-19-1	12th	
1987-88	Dartmouth	10-15-1	8-13-1	9th	
1988-89	Dartmouth	8-17-1	7-14-1	9th	
1989-90	Dartmouth	4-18-4	4-14-4	11th	
Dartmouth:		36-108-8	28-94-8		
Total:		122-143-9			
National champion Postseason invitational champion Conference regular season champion Conference regular season and conference tournament champion Division regular season champion Division regular season and conference tournament champion Conference tournament champion
