= RIT Tigers men's ice hockey =

Sports team of the Rochester Institute of Technology

- Current season
- University: Rochester Institute of Technology
- Conference: AHA
- Head coach: Matt Thomas; 1st season, 17–17–2 (.500)
- Assistant coaches: David Insalaco; Shane Madolora; Josh Mitchell
- Arena: Gene Polisseni Center; Henrietta, New York
- Student section: RIT Corner Crew
- Colors: Orange, white, and black

NCAA tournament champions
- DII: 1983; DIII: 1985

NCAA tournament Frozen Four
- DI: 2010; DII: 1983; DIII: 1984, 1985, 1986, 1989, 1996, 1999, 2001

NCAA tournament appearances
- DI: 2010, 2015, 2016, 2024; DII: 1983; DIII: 1985, 1986, 1989, 1994, 1996, 1997, 1998, 1999, 2000, 2001, 2002

Conference tournament champions
- ECAC 2: 1984; ECAC West: 1986, 1989, 1994, 1996, 1999, 2000, 2001, 2002; AHA: 2010, 2015, 2016, 2024

Conference regular season champions
- NYCHA: 1983, 1984, 1985, 1986; ECAC 2: 1984; ECAC West: 1985, 1986, 1989, 1996, 1997, 1999, 2000, 2001, 2002, 2003; AHA: 2007, 2009, 2010, 2011, 2023, 2024 (Note: RIT was in both the NYCHL and ECAC 2 / ECAC West from 1981 to 1986.)

Current uniform

The RIT Tigers men's ice hockey team is a collegiate ice hockey team representing the Rochester Institute of Technology in suburban Rochester, New York, United States. The school's men's team competes in the Division I Atlantic Hockey America. The team has won two national championships, one each at the Division II and Division III levels. It lost in the semifinals of the Division I "Frozen Four" in 2010.

== History ==
=== Founding, Division II and Division III ===
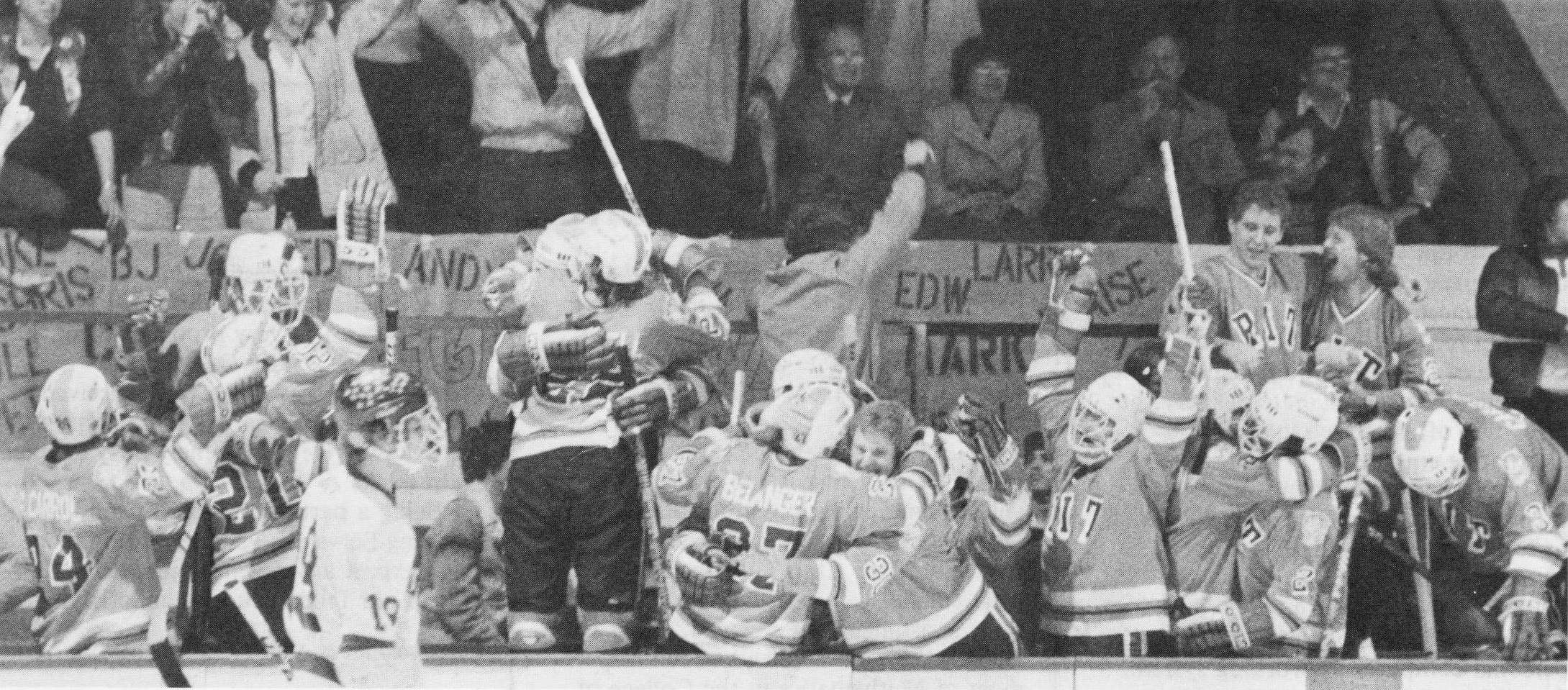
RIT's bench explodes in celebration during the final seconds of the 1983 championship game.

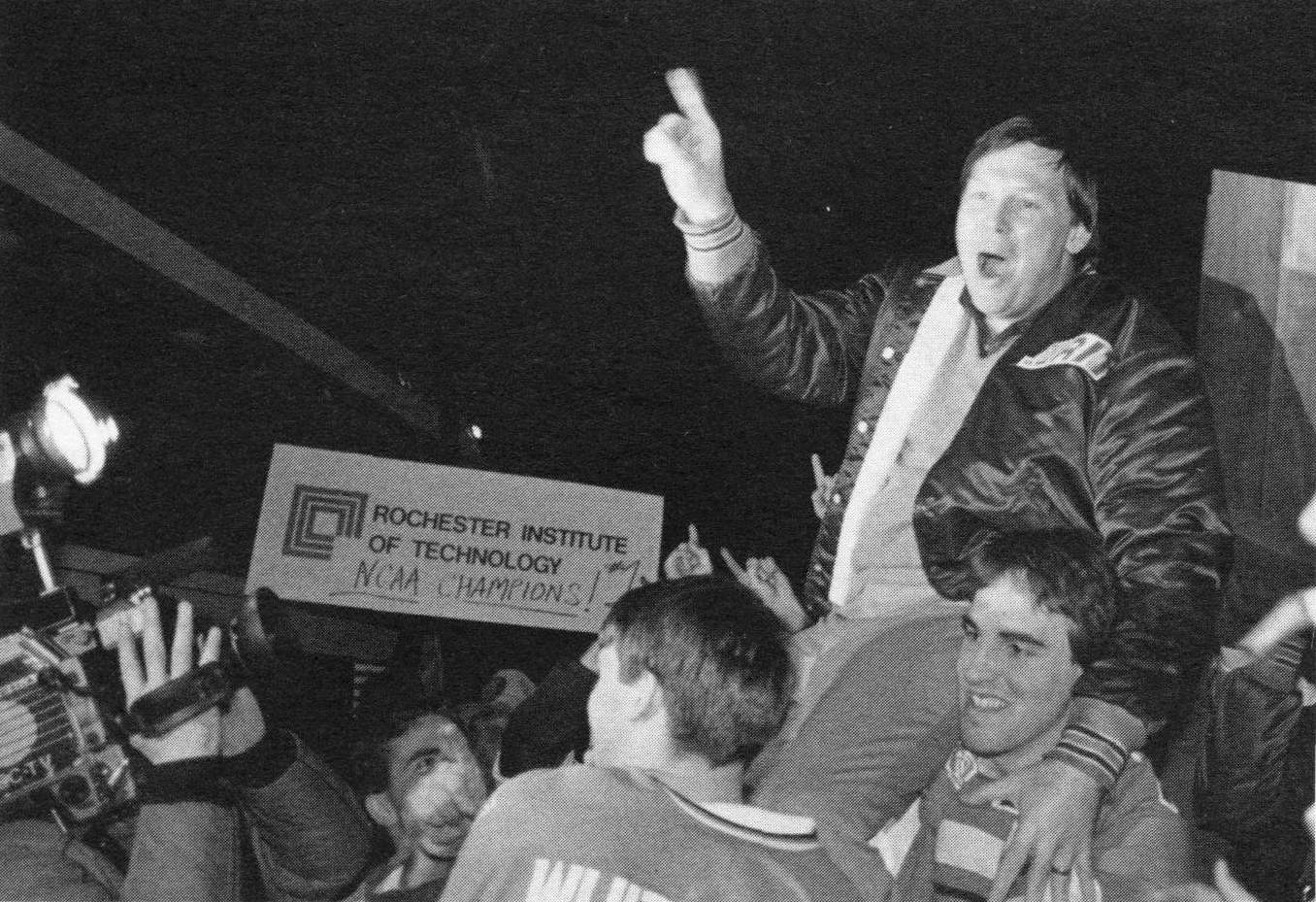
RIT players carry coach Bruce Delventhal after winning the 1985 national championship.

In the fall of 1957, RIT student Jack Trickey founded the Monroe County Amateur Hockey (MCAHA) Association. A group of RIT students made up the majority of one of the teams. In 1958, the RIT Hockey Club was founded, and competed in the MCAHA until the league folded in 1960. The RIT hockey team continued to play against junior varsity and club teams. The RIT student council and athletic committee recommended that hockey be added to the athletic program, and men's hockey later became a varsity sport. The 1962–63 season was their first major season, as coached by Jim Heffer. In 1982, under third-year coach Brian Mason, they had their first twenty-win season with 23 wins to only nine losses. The team competed at the Division II and III level for several years. The Tigers won the NCAA Division II men's ice hockey tournament in 1983. In April 1984, Mason left the program to coach at Dartmouth. He was replaced by Bruce Delventhal. The 1985–86 team won 31 games and then won the NCAA Division III men's ice hockey tournament by a score of 5–1 over Bemidji State. While the Tigers made the Frozen Four four times from 1984 to 1989, they did not reach the D-III Tournament again until 1994 with Eric Hoffberg as coach. When he left after the 1999 season, he had taken the Tigers to the tournament five times and reached the Frozen Four twice. In 2004, it was announced that the Tigers would move up to the NCAA Division I level for the 2005–2006 season.

=== NCAA Division I ===
In their first year (2005–2006) in the Atlantic Hockey Association, the Tigers went 6–22–2. In their second season, they won the regular-season title with 21 wins. They were ineligible to compete in the playoffs until the 2007–2008 season. In the 2007–2008 season, the Tigers played in the Mariucci Classic in which they stunned the number-12-ranked Minnesota Golden Gophers by a score of 4–3. However, they fell to number-14-ranked Boston College 6–0. During the playoffs, they swept Holy Cross but were shut out in the first round of the AHA Tournament 5–0 by the Air Force Falcons, who were without their Hobey Baker finalist Eric Ehn. In the 2008–2009 season, the Tigers played some of their best regular-season hockey (notably an 11-game win streak from December 6 to January 25). They met Holy Cross again in the playoffs and won the series 2–1 but fell in the AHA Tournament to the Mercyhurst Lakers 5–4 in overtime. Highlights of the game include Mercyhurst overcoming a 3–1 deficit and the Tigers tying the game with under a minute left. In the 2009–10 season, their most successful season to date, the Tigers made a historic run all the way to the 2010 NCAA Frozen Four, sweeping Connecticut in the first round and winning the AHA Tournament by beating the Canisius Golden Griffins as well as the Sacred Heart Pioneers to advance to the NCAA tournament as the conference's autobid. The Tigers stunned the Denver Pioneers 2–1 and then finished off the University of New Hampshire Wildcats 6–2 in the east regional in Albany, New York, where they advanced to the Frozen Four. The team's run came to an end in the national semifinals, where they fell to the University of Wisconsin Badgers, 8–1.

In the 2010–2011 season, the Tigers played in the Maverick stampede but lost both their games against number-4-ranked St. Cloud State and the University of Nebraska–Omaha. The Tigers won yet another regular season title and made it all the way to the AHA championship game, where they fell to the Air Force Falcons by a score of 1–0. Air Force goaltender Jason Torf made 40 saves in the contest. In the 2011–2012 season, the Tigers struggled early on, but bounced back in the second half of the season, eliminating the Bentley Falcons after falling behind 1–0 in the first round series of the Atlantic Hockey playoffs, but prevailing in their next two games. They advanced again to the AHA championship game where they eliminated Niagara in overtime but fell, yet again, to the Air Force Falcons, getting shut out 4–0. The Tigers struggled over the next two seasons, as they finished 2012–2013 with a record of 15–18–5, their first losing record since joining Atlantic Hockey. This was also the first time they were unable to advance to the Atlantic Hockey semifinals at Blue Cross Arena, as they defeated American International College in the first round, but were swept by the Niagara Purple Eagles in the second round, losing in overtime in the second game. The following year (2013–2014), the Tigers played their final season at their home ice rink, Frank Ritter Memorial Ice Arena. The Tigers only won 6 out of 16 games at their home arena. Although they struggled that season, the Tigers participated in the "Frozen Frontier," a 10-day hockey festival at Rochester's Frontier Field outdoor baseball stadium. The Tigers took on their AHA rivals, the Niagara University Purple Eagles on December 14. The teams skated to a 2–2 tie in a snow storm and 16-degree temperatures. In their final game at Ritter Arena, the Tigers defeated their long time AHA rival, the Canisius College Golden Griffins 3–1. In the playoffs, the Tigers won the first game in overtime against Holy Cross before getting blown away in game two by a score of 5–1. In the deciding game, The Tigers led 2–0 but Holy Cross came from behind to tie the game in the second period, forcing overtime where they completed the comeback.

The Tigers moved into the 4,300-seat Gene Polisseni Center for the 2014–15 season. Their first season in the Polisseni Center saw the Tigers finish with a 20–15–5 overall record. They played in the Mariucci classic, losing both games against number-9-ranked Massachusetts–Lowell and number-8-ranked Minnesota. In the playoffs, they swept the Air Force Falcons in the second round after receiving a bye in the first round. The Tigers went on to defeat Canisius in the semifinals of the AHA Tournament by a score of 2–1 and the Meryhurst Lakers in the championship game by a score of 5–1 to win the Atlantic Hockey championship and advance to the NCAA Division I tournament for the second time in program history. The Tigers knocked off the Minnesota State Mavericks in the first round of the NCAA tournament 2–1, becoming the first No. 16 seed to defeat the top overall seed since the 16-team format was implemented in 2003. There would be no repeat, however, of the 2009–2010 run to the Frozen Four as the Tigers fell to the University of Nebraska Omaha Mavericks in the following round by a score of 4–0, ending their playoff run. In the 2015–16 season, the Tigers lost home ice in the first round to Mercyhurst as they were swept in their last two games of the regular season on home ice; however, the Tigers returned the favor in the postseason by sweeping the Lakers on the road. The Tigers once again were in the AHA tournament and faced the Air Force Falcons once again. The Tigers trailed 1–0 heading into the third and it would appear that they were headed to another shutout loss, but Andrew Miller scored with under 3 minutes left in the third to even the score. In overtime, the Tigers completed their comeback winning 2–1. The Tigers would then claim the Atlantic Hockey championship once again, convincingly defeating the Robert Morris Colonials by a score of 7–4, to advance to the NCAA Division 1 tournament for the second consecutive season. The team's playoff run ended in the first round of the east regional in Albany, New York by the first-ranked Quinnipiac Bobcats by a score of 4–0. The 2016–2017 season was a down year for the Tigers as they flirted with the .500 mark within their conference and were unable to defeat any non-conference teams. They faced Niagara in the first round of the playoffs losing a close one 5–4 in game 1 but shutting them out 5–0 in game 2 setting the stage for the deciding game 3. They were unable to complete the comeback as the Purple Eagles ended the Tigers' season winning 4–1.

In the 2017–2018 season, the Tigers started the season with their first game at Blue Cross Arena for Brick City weekend against the number-14th-ranked Northeastern University. It was the first meeting between these two schools. RIT jumped out to a 3–0 lead only to see Northeastern comeback and tie it. The Tigers performed well during the first half of the season but slumped during the second half. The Tigers finished with an overall record of 14–18–2 and a 13–14–1 for 27 points within their conference. Junior Erik Brown set a new school record with 28 goals during the season (including exhibition games) and also led the entire Atlantic Hockey Conference. His 28 goals was also 2nd overall in Division I hockey. In the playoffs, the Tigers faced the Sacred Heart Pioneers. Both teams split the first two games with both games heading to overtime. The Tigers prevailed in Game 1 scoring quickly in overtime to take a 1–0 series lead. The Pioneers prevailed in Game 2 after tying the game late in the third and finally ending it during triple overtime (the longest game in program history). In the deciding game, the Pioneers jumped out to a 2–0 lead early in the first and held the fort the rest of the way to clinch the series concluding the Tigers' season.

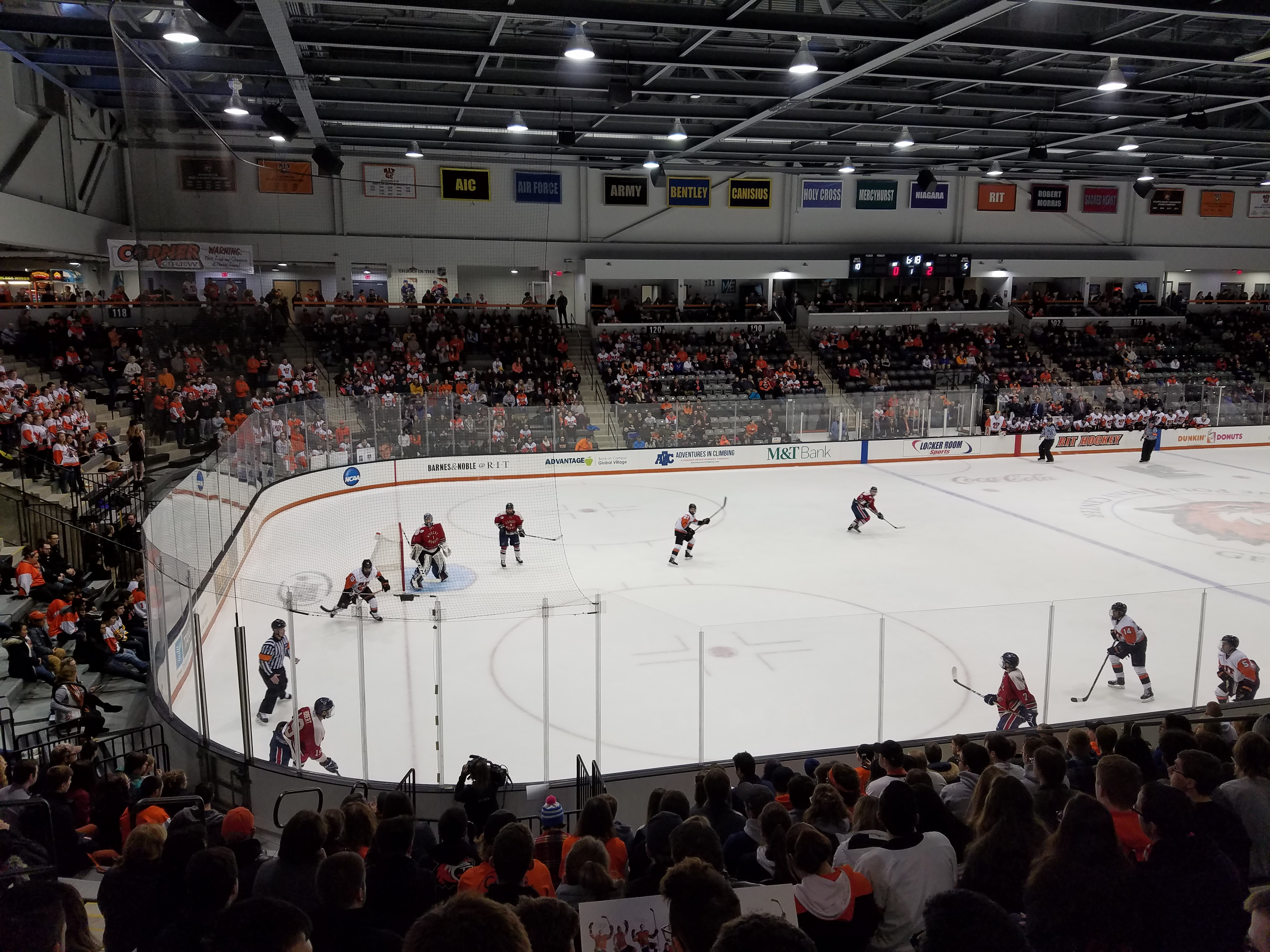
RIT men's hockey in action against Robert Morris University at the Gene Polisseni Center in 2019

The Tigers finished the 2018–2019 with a record (17–17–4) and played the Arizona State Sun Devils for the first time. Despite the Sun Devils recently moving into Division 1, the Tigers got swept on home ice. In the playoffs, they faced Sacred Heart. They split the first two games with lopsided results (9–4 loss in Game 1 and a 7–3 win in Game 2) before edging them out in Game 3 with a 3–1 victory. The Tigers would then face the Niagara Purple Eagles in the next round. The game was intense with the goalies stealing the show. After regulation ended with no goals the game was decided in overtime where Niagara scored 7:03 into extra time to win 1–0.

The 2019–2020 season saw the Tigers play in the Icebreaker tournament in Ohio with a pair of games against Coach Wayne Wilson's and Associate Head Coach Brian Hills' Alma mater, the Bowling Green State Falcons as well as the Ohio State University Buckeyes. RIT prevailed against the Falcons in overtime (3–2) but fell to the Buckeyes (3–1). The Tigers had their ups and downs during the season but play was disrupted throughout the league when the COVID-19 pandemic cancelled the playoffs.

During the off-season, the school was debating whether or not to hold a season for the 2020–2021 season. On November 10, 2020, the school decided to cancel the season due to the pandemic. This prompted the team to issue a statement on Twitter showing an inconsistency (RIT plans to have a 12% increase in in-person learning next semester) as well as the fact that the season was to start in between semesters creating a comfortable bubble. Seven days later, the school reconsidered and declared that the season was set to move forward. The season got underway November 27 against Clarkson with RIT coming out victorious 8–5 in front of zero fans. This season also marked the debut of the Long Island University Sharks which RIT hosted and split the series. RIT finished the abridged season with a record of 9–9–2 and made an early exit from the playoffs getting swept by Canisius.

The Tigers finished 2021–22 season in fourth place in the AHA, followed by a 2–1 series victory in the quarterfinals at home against Sacred Heart. The Tigers lost their semifinals matchup against Air Force in Utica.

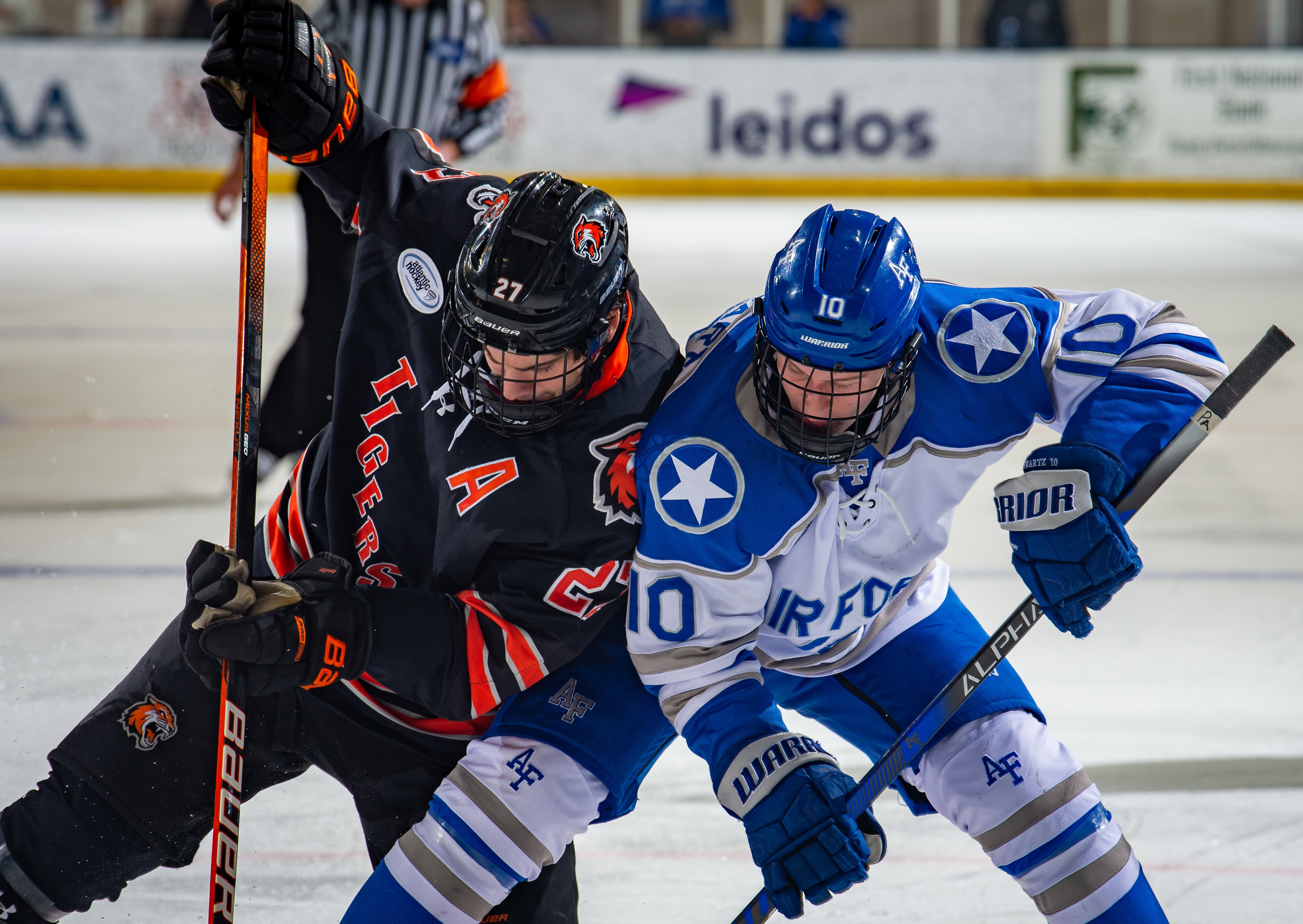
A game between RIT and Air Force in 2022

The 2022–23 season saw the Tigers win their first Atlantic Hockey Association Regular season Championship since the 2010–11 season. The Tigers began the year strong, with highlights including their 8–5 defeat of Union during the Brick City Homecoming Game (also the team's first victory over the Dutchmen), and an 8-game win streak. As a result of their strong play, the Tigers found themselves nationally ranked in both the USCHO Poll and the USA Today Hockey Poll (peaking at No. 18 in both). However, the end of the regular season saw the Tigers slide, dropping out of the USCHO and USA Today rankings and winning only 4 of their final 9 contests. Despite this, the Tigers finished with a record of 22–11–1 (18–7–1 in conference play), their most wins since their 2009–10 season, and clinched the first seed in the Atlantic Hockey playoffs. The Tigers swept the eighth seed Mercyhurst Lakers in the Atlantic Hockey Quarterfinals best-of-three series, but were upset in the Semifinals by the seventh seed Holy Cross Crusaders, losing that series 2–1. Four of the six members of the season's Atlantic Hockey's All-Conference First Team were RIT Tigers; forward Carter Wilke, defensemen Gianfranco Cassaro and Aiden Hansen-Bukata, and goaltender Tommy Scarfone.

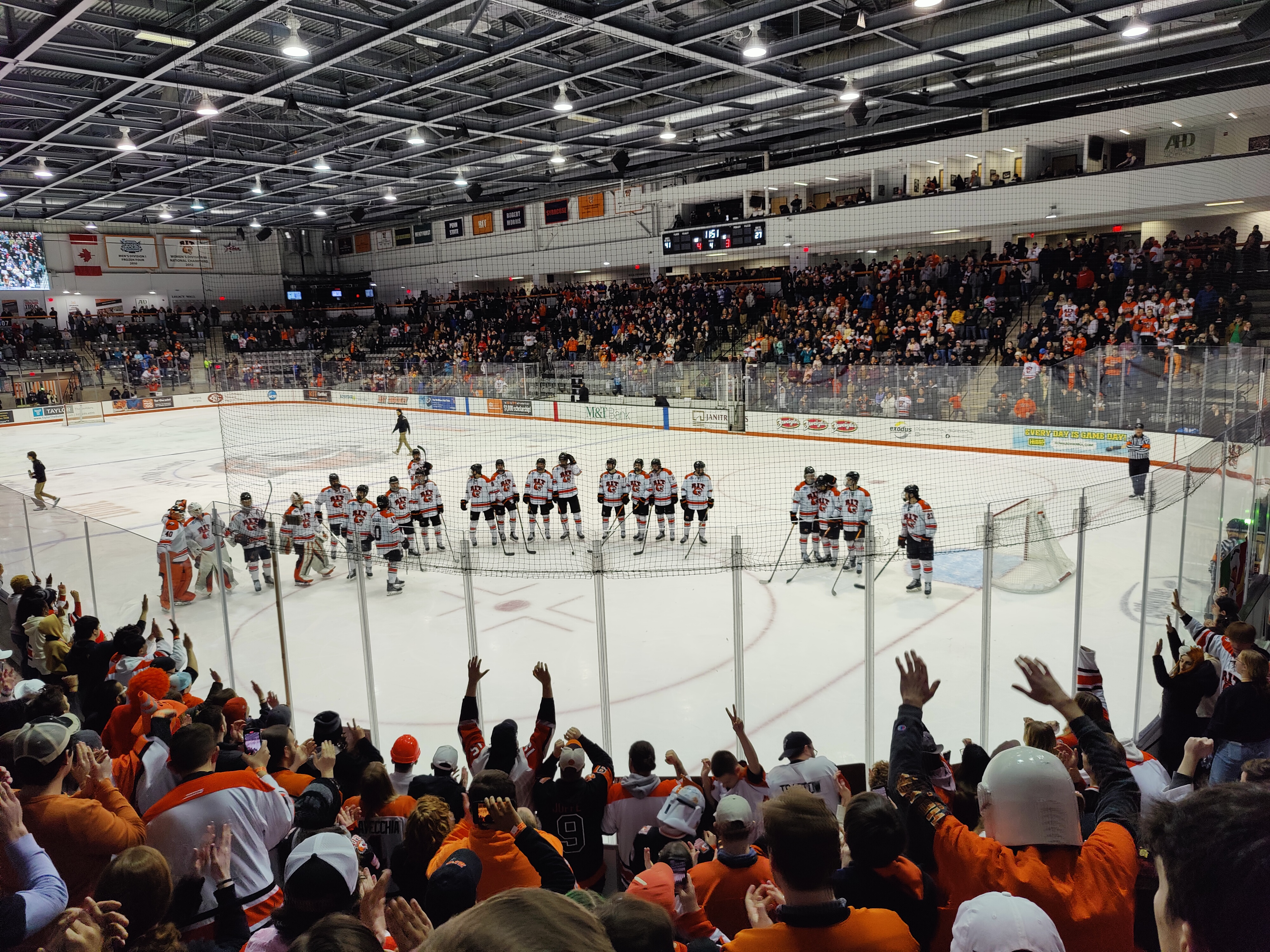
RIT celebrates a playoff series victory in 2023

The Tigers opened their 2023–24 season with a loss at St. Lawrence, but rebounded with a 3–0 win over Notre Dame in the Brick City Homecoming Game a week later, and opened Atlantic Hockey play with a 4–2 home victory over Sacred Heart. Junior goaltender Tommy Scarfone was named the Atlantic Hockey Goaltender of the Month for the month of October, as RIT earned a spot in the USCHO rankings at No. 20 after the first weekend of November. The Tigers would remain in the rankings, moving as high as #18 as they entered the mid-season break. Returning from the break, RIT participated in the Dartmouth Ledyard Classic tournament hosted by Dartmouth University, splitting the two games they played. With a 3–0 victory against Bentley on January 26, Scarfone earned his 44th win for the Tigers, becoming the leader in goaltender wins for RIT since the program moved up to Division I. The Tigers clinched a first round bye in the Atlantic Hockey Tournament after beating Air Force on February 16, and first place in the AHA season following a defeat of second place Holy Cross by Bentley on February 22. This regular season championship was the Tigers' second in a row and RIT's sixth since joining the conference. RIT proceeded to sweep both the conference quarterfinals against Robert Morris and semifinals against Niagara, and subsequently defeated AIC 5–2 in the Atlantic Hockey Championship Game to earn their first NCAA tournament appearance since 2016. As with the previous season, four Tigers were named to the AHA All-Conference First Team: Wilkie, Cassaro, and Scarfone each for the second consecutive season, in addition to forward Cody Laskosky. Scarfone and head coach Wayne Wilson were named as the conference's goaltender and coach of the year, respectively.

Shortly after the 2023–24 season, the Association merged with the women-only College Hockey America (CHA), forming Atlantic Hockey America. All members of both the Association and CHA were included in the merger.

Wayne Wilson announced his retirement on April 9, 2025. Alumnus Matt Thomas was announced as the new head coach the next day.

== Brick City Homecoming game results ==
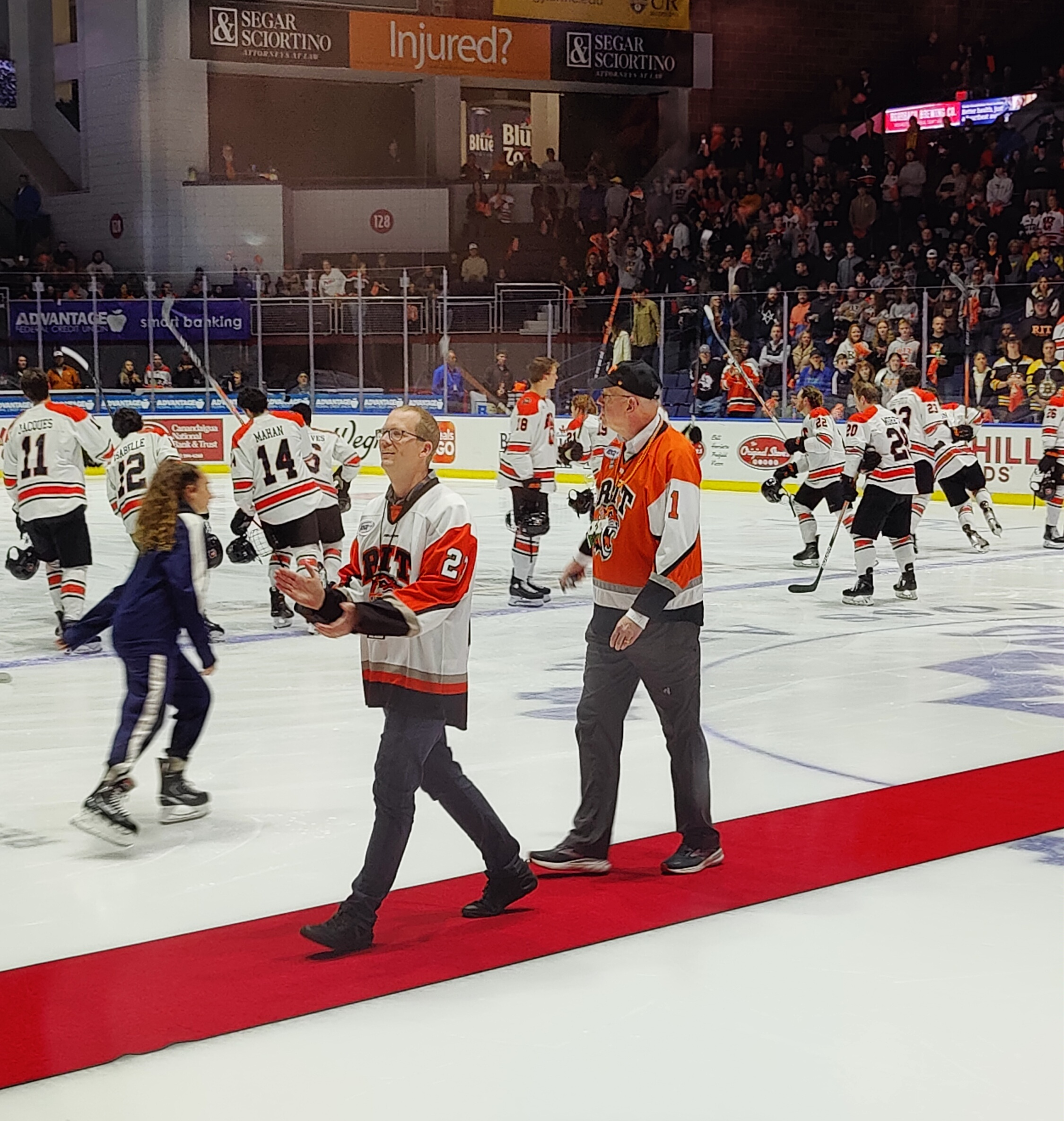
Author and internet personality Hank Green was a special guest for the 2023 Homecoming Game, participating in the ceremonial puck drop with RIT president David Munson

The Brick City Homecoming game is RIT's annual homecoming game that takes place at the Blue Cross Arena in downtown Rochester. The game is part of Brick City Homecoming and Family Weekend, and typically draws at or near a sellout crowd.

Year-to-Year Results
Date	Home	Goals For	Away	Goals Against	Results
Oct. 27, 2007	RIT	4	(18) Cornell	1	W
Oct. 18, 2008	RIT	1	St. Lawrence	2	L
Oct. 10, 2009	RIT	2	Colgate	3	L
Oct. 16, 2010	RIT	4	UMass Lowell	4	T/OT
Oct. 15, 2011	RIT	6	St. Lawrence	5	W/OT
Oct. 20, 2012	RIT	2	Penn State	3	L
Oct. 12, 2013	RIT	4	(11) Michigan	7	L
Oct. 18, 2014	RIT	2	(7) Boston College	6	L
Oct. 17, 2015	RIT	2	(10) Bowling Green	2	T/OT
Oct. 15, 2016	RIT	1	Connecticut	1	T/OT
Oct. 14, 2017	RIT	3	(14) Northeastern	3	T/OT
Oct. 20, 2018	RIT	6	Colgate	1	W
Oct. 19, 2019	RIT	4	Merrimack	0	W
Oct. 24, 2020	RIT	—	Notre Dame	—	Cancelled due to COVID-19 pandemic
Oct. 16, 2021	RIT	2	St. Lawrence	1	W
Oct. 15, 2022	RIT	8	Union	5	W
Oct. 14, 2023	RIT	3	Notre Dame	0	W
Oct. 19, 2024	RIT	1	Bowling Green	2	L/OT
TOTALS		55		46	7–6–4

== Records vs. current Atlantic Hockey America teams ==
As of the completion of 2022–23 season

School	Team	Away Arena	Overall record	Win %	Last Result
Air Force Academy	Falcons	Cadet Ice Arena	25–34–4	.429	5–2 W
American International College	Yellow Jackets	MassMutual Center	34–10–3	.745	5–2 W
Army West Point	Black Knights	Tate Rink	27–6–7	.763	5–3 W
Bentley University	Falcons	Bentley Arena	27–16–4	.617	2-1 W (OT)
Canisius College	Golden Griffins	LECOM Harborcenter	28–26–2	.518	2–3 L (OT)
College of the Holy Cross	Crusaders	Hart Center	34–15–8	.667	3–2 W
Mercyhurst University	Lakers	Mercyhurst Ice Center	34–20–6	.617	2-3 L
Niagara University	Purple Eagles	Dwyer Arena	18–21–15	.472	4-2 W
Robert Morris University	Colonials	Colonials Arena	22–15–6	.581	7-1 W
Sacred Heart University	Pioneers	Martire Family Arena	34–17–2	.660	2-5 L

== Head coaches ==
As of the completion of 2025–26 season

Tenure	Coach	Years	Record	Pct.
1964–1968	Jim Heffer	4	46–24–1	.655
1968–1980	Daryl Sullivan	12	131–136–3	.491
1980–1984	Brian Mason	4	86–35–1	.709
1984–1988	Bruce Delventhal	4	87–39–2	.688
1988–1989	Buddy Powers	1	26–8–2	.750
1989–1999	Eric Hoffberg	10	188–82–22	.682
1999–2025	Wayne Wilson	26	474–337–82	.577
2025–Present	Matt Thomas	1	17–17–2	.500
Totals	8 coaches	62 seasons	1052–678–115	.601

=== Current staff ===
- Head coach: Matt Thomas
- Associate head coach: TBA
- Assistant coach: TBA
- Athletic trainer: Ben Emke
- Hockey operations coordinator: Stephen Henchen
- Student manager: Oscar Nguyen
- Strength & conditioning coach: Ryan Kelly

== NCAA tournament appearances ==
=== Division I ===
Year	Bracket	Location	Opponent	Result
2010	East Regional	Times Union Center	Denver	W 2–1
2010	East Regional	Times Union Center	New Hampshire	W 6–2
2010	Frozen Four	Ford Field	Wisconsin	L 1–8
2015	Midwest Regional	Compton Family Ice Arena	Minnesota State	W 2–1
2015	Midwest Regional	Compton Family Ice Arena	Omaha	L 0–4
2016	East Regional	Times Union Center	Quinnipiac	L 0–4
2024	West Regional	Denny Sanford Premier Center	Boston University	L 3–6

== Statistical leaders ==
=== Career points leaders ===
Player	Years	GP	G	A	Pts	PIM
Chris Johnstone	1981–1985	129	114	136	250	
Pete Bournazakis	1997–2001	116	100	129	229	
Scott Brown	1985–1989	130	103	122	225	
Mike Bournazakis	1999–2003	111	70	144	214	
Pat Staerker	1996–2000	121	76	134	210	
Chris Maybury	1992–1996	106	82	126	208	
Dennis Lepley	1965–1970	79	111	92	203	
Ritchie Herbert	1983–1987	102	88	114	202	
Ken Vokac	1966–1970		94	102	196	
Bobby Trowell	1981–1985	122	96	90	186	

=== Career goaltending leaders ===
GP = Games played; Min = Minutes played; W = Wins; L = Losses; T = Ties; GA = Goals against; SO = Shutouts; SV% = Save percentage; GAA = Goals against average

Minimum 30 games

Player	Years	GP	Min	W	L	T	GA	SO	SV%	GAA
Shane Madolora	2009–2012	65	3827	36	14	12	126	13	.932	1.98
Tommy Scarfone	2021–2024	90	5410	55	29	4	213	9	.921	2.36
Tyler Euverman	1999–2003	106	5975	83	13	5	242	12	.918	2.43
Jared DeMichiel	2006–2010	66	3774	41	19	2	156	7	.909	2.48
Mike Rotolo	2013–2017	94	5503	40	44	7	245	6	.906	2.67

Statistics current through the end of the 2023–24 regular season.

== Players ==
=== Current roster ===
As of August 23, 2025.

No.	Nat.	Player	Class	Pos	Height	Weight	DoB	Hometown	Previous team	NHL rights
1	(Czech Republic)	Jakub Krbeček	Sophomore	G	6' 2" (1.88 m)	194 lb (88 kg)	2003-02-01	Prague, Czech Republic	Philadelphia Rebels (NAHL)	—
2	(Canada)	Brock Reinhart	Freshman	D	6' 3" (1.91 m)	194 lb (88 kg)	2004-07-06	Elora, Ontario	Penticton Vees (BCHL)	—
3	(United States)	Ryan Williams	Sophomore	D	6' 3" (1.91 m)	201 lb (91 kg)	2003-06-08	Pleasantville, Ohio	Janesville Jets (NAHL)	—
5	(Sweden)	Gustav Blom	Senior	F	6' 0" (1.83 m)	180 lb (82 kg)	2001-01-30	Stockholm, Sweden	New Mexico Ice Wolves (USHL)	—
6	(Canada)	Matthew Wilde	Junior	D	6' 2" (1.88 m)	198 lb (90 kg)	2002-04-30	Mississauga, Ontario	Toronto Jr. Canadiens (OJHL)	—
7	(Canada)	Austin Brimmer	Senior	F	6' 3" (1.91 m)	218 lb (99 kg)	2001-10-10	Markham, Ontario	Long Island (NCAA)	—
8	(Canada)	Zach Wigle	Freshman	F	6' 0" (1.83 m)	192 lb (87 kg)	2004-01-12	Oakville, Ontario	North Bay Battalion (OHL)	—
10	(Canada)	Philippe Jacques	Senior	F	6' 4" (1.93 m)	200 lb (91 kg)	2002-10-29	Quebec City, Quebec	Ottawa Jr. Senators (CCHL)	—
11	(United States)	Caleb Elfering	Freshman	F	5' 9" (1.75 m)	165 lb (75 kg)	2004-09-15	Richland, Washington	Chilliwack Chiefs (BCHL)	—
12	(Canada)	Simon Isabelle	Senior	F	5' 10" (1.78 m)	170 lb (77 kg)	2001-01-12	Whitehorse, Yukon	Ottawa Jr. Senators (CCHL)	—
14	(Canada)	Tyler Mahan	Senior	F	6' 0" (1.83 m)	190 lb (86 kg)	2001-12-14	Calgary, Alberta	Whitecourt Wolverines (AJHL)	—
15	(Canada)	Adam Jeffery	Senior	F	6' 5" (1.96 m)	200 lb (91 kg)	2001-05-08	Leamington, Ontario	Leamington Flyers (GOJHL)	—
16	(Canada)	Ty Whyte	Sophomore	F	6' 0" (1.83 m)	174 lb (79 kg)	2003-04-02	Richmond, Ontario	Kemptville 73's (CCHL)	—
17	(Canada)	Tristan Allen	Sophomore	D	5' 11" (1.8 m)	181 lb (82 kg)	2003-08-05	Kamloops, British Columbia	Salmon Arm Silverbacks (CCHL)	—
18	(United States)	Kevin Scott	Junior	D	6' 3" (1.91 m)	215 lb (98 kg)	2003-04-30	Ashburn, Virginia	Fargo Force (USHL)	—
19	(United States)	Camden Bajzer	Freshman	F	5' 10" (1.78 m)	181 lb (82 kg)	2004-03-12	Cleveland, Ohio	Cowichan Valley Capitals (BCHL)	—
20	(Canada)	Ben Roger	Junior	D	6' 4" (1.93 m)	201 lb (91 kg)	2002-11-03	Markham, Ontario	Saint Mary's (AUS)	OTT, 49th overall 2021
21	(Canada)	Mathieu Cobetto-Roy	Sophomore	F	5' 11" (1.8 m)	174 lb (79 kg)	2003-10-21	Outremont, Quebec	Trail Smoke Eaters (BCHL)	—
22	(United States)	Will Moore	Freshman	F	5' 11" (1.8 m)	185 lb (84 kg)	2004-03-22	Westfield, Indiana	Prince George Spruce Kings (BCHL)	—
23	(Canada)	Christian Catalano	Junior	F	6' 1" (1.85 m)	190 lb (86 kg)	2003-05-23	Mississauga, Ontario	Maryland Black Bears (NAHL)	—
24	(Canada)	Mason Croucher	Sophomore	D	6' 2" (1.88 m)	185 lb (84 kg)	1999-01-13	Victoria, British Columbia	Alberni Valley Bulldogs (BCHL)	—
25	(United States)	Alex Christopoulos	Sophomore	F	6' 0" (1.83 m)	194 lb (88 kg)	2003-03-26	Richmond Hill, Ontario	St. Francis Xavier (AUS)	—
26	(Canada)	Evan Konyen	Freshman	F	6' 0" (1.83 m)	181 lb (82 kg)	2004-02-22	Newmarket, Ontario	Flint Firebirds (OHL)	—
27	(Canada)	Crossley Stewart	Junior	D	6' 3" (1.91 m)	190 lb (86 kg)	2002-05-30	Prince Rupert, British Columbia	Burlington Cougars (OJHL)	—
28	(Canada)	Xavier Lapointe	Senior	D	6' 0" (1.83 m)	190 lb (86 kg)	2002-01-26	Quebec City, Quebec	Flin Flon Bombers (SJHL)	—
32	(United States)	Trent Burnham	Senior (RS)	G	6' 0" (1.83 m)	160 lb (73 kg)	2000-03-27	Eagle River, Alaska	Lindenwood (NCAA)	—
33	(Canada)	Collin Mackenzie	Freshman	G	6' 0" (1.83 m)	174 lb (79 kg)	2004-11-30	Elora, Ontario	Ottawa 67's (OHL)	—

== Awards and honors ==
=== NCAA ===
==== Individual awards ====
Edward Jeremiah Award

- Wayne Wilson: 2001

Spencer Penrose Award

- Wayne Wilson: 2010

==== Division I All-Americans ====
AHCA Second Team All-Americans

- 2014–15: Matt Garbowsky, F
- 2020–21: Will Calverley, F
- 2023–24: Gianfranco Cassaro, D

==== Division II All-Americans ====
First Team All-Americans

- 1983–84: Dave Burkholder, G; Chris Johnstone, F

Second Team All-Americans

- 1983–84: B. J. Hull, D

==== Division III All-Americans ====
First Team All-Americans

- 1984–85: Blaise MacDonald, D
- 1988–89: Scott Brown, F
- 1990–91: Bill Gall, D
- 1993–94: Jay Murphy, F
- 1995–96: Chris Maybury, F
- 1996–97: Steve Toll, F
- 1998–99: Jerry Galway, D; Pat Staerker, F
- 2000–01: Tyler Euverman, D; Jerry Galway, D; Derek Hahn, F; Pete Bournazakis, F
- 2001–02: Jerry Galway, D
- 2002–03: Mike Bournazakis, F

Second Team All-Americans

- 1984–85: Chris Johnstone, F
- 1985–86: John Hawkins, D
- 1988–89: Tim Cordik, D
- 1989–90: Chris Palmer, F
- 1994–95: Chris Maybury, F
- 1995–96: Adam French, D
- 1996–97: Jamie Morris, G; Brian Cossette, D
- 1997–98: Pat Staerker, F
- 1999–00: Pat Staerker, F
- 2003–04: Mike Tarantino, F

=== ECAC 2 ===
==== Individual awards ====
Rookie of the Year

- Ron Kerr: 1979
- Chris Johnstone: 1982
- B. J. Hull: 1983
- Ritchie Herbert: 1984

==== All-Conference Teams ====
First Team All-ECAC 2

- 1981–82: Dave Burkholder, G; Jim Larouche, D
- 1982–83: Dave Burkholder, G; Chris Johnstone, F
- 1983–84: Dave Burkholder, G; B. J. Hull, D; Chris Johnstone, F

Second Team All-ECAC 2

- 1981–82: Chris Johnstone, F

=== ECAC West ===
==== Individual awards ====
Player of the Year

- John Hawkins: 1986
- Scott McNair: 1993
- Jay Murphy: 1994
- Pat Staerker: 1999, 2000
- Jerry Galway: 2002
- Mike Tarantino: 2004

Rookie of the Year

- Scott Brown: 1986
- Fred Abraham: 1988
- Steve Toll: 1995
- Jamie Morris: 1996
- Pete Bournazakis: 1998
- Mike Bournazakis: 2000
- Mike Tarantino: 2001
- Tristan Fairbarn: 2004

Goaltender of the Year

- Tyler Euverman: 2001

Coach of the Year

- Wayne Wilson: 2000, 2001, 2002

==== All-Conference teams ====
First Team All-ECAC West

- 1984–85: Blaise MacDonald, D; Chris Johnstone, F
- 1985–86: John Hawkins, D; Ritchie Herbert, F
- 1986–87: Ritchie Herbert, F
- 1987–88: Scott Brown, F
- 1988–89: Scott Brown, F
- 1989–90: Tim Cordick, D; Chris Palmer, F
- 1990–91: Bill Gall, D
- 1993–94: Kyle O'Brien, D
- 1995–96: Jamie Morris, G; Adam French, D; Chris Maybury, F
- 1996–97: Jamie Morris, G; Kelly Morel, D; Steve Toll, F
- 1997–98: Jamie Morris, G; Pete Bournazakis, F; Pat Staerker, F
- 1998–99: Jerry Galway, D; Luke Murphy, F
- 2000–01: Tyler Euverman, G; Jerry Galway, D; Pete Bournazakis, F; Mike Bournazakis, F; Derek Hahn, F
- 2001–02: Jerry Galway, D; Mike Bournazakis, F
- 2002–03: Ryan Francke, D; Mike Bournazakis, F
- 2003–04: Ryan Francke, D; Mike Tarantino, F
- 2004–05: Marc Hyman, D

Second Team All-ECAC West

- 1987–88: Tim Cordick, D
- 1988–89: Fred Abraham, G; Tim Cordick, D
- 1990–91: Steve Mirabile, F
- 1991–92: Tom Masaschi, F
- 2000–01: Ryan Fairbarn, D
- 2001–02: Tyler Euverman, G; Ryan Fairbarn, D; Mike Tarantino, F
- 2002–03: Tyler Euverman, G; Ryan Fairbarn, D; Mike Tarantino, F
- 2003–04: George Eliopolous, G; Ryan Fairbarn, D; Darren Doherty, F
- 2004–05: Jason Chafe, F

All-ECAC West Rookie Team

- 2000–01: Rob Boope, G; Ryan Fairbarn, D; Matt Moore, D; Mike Tarantino, F
- 2001–02: Roberto Orofiamma, F
- 2002–03: Darren Doherty, F
- 2003–04: Brad Harris, F; Tristan Fairbarn, F
- 2004–05: Simon Lambert, F

=== Atlantic Hockey ===
==== Individual awards ====
Player of the Year

- Matt Garbowsky: 2015
- Will Calverley: 2021
- Carter Wilkie: 2023

Goaltender of the Year

- Tommy Scarfone: 2024

Rookie of the Year

- Al Mazur: 2007
- Christopher Tanev: 2010
- Adam Brubacher: 2017
- Carter Wilkie: 2022

Best Defensive Forward

- Matt Garbowsky: 2015
- Will Calverley: 2021
- Cody Laskosky: 2023

Best Defenseman

- Dan Ringwald: 2010
- Chase Norrish: 2016
- Aiden Hansen-Bukata: 2023

Individual Sportsmanship Award

- Mark Cornacchia: 2012

Regular season Goaltending Award

- Louis Menard: 2007
- Jared DeMichiel: 2010
- Shane Madolora: 2011

Regular season Scoring Trophy

- Simon Lambert: 2008
- Matt Garbowsky: 2015
- Will Calverley: 2021

Coach of the Year

- Wayne Wilson: 2023, 2024

Most Valuable Player in tournament

- Cameron Burt: 2010
- Matt Garbowsky: 2015
- Myles Powell: 2016
- Elijah Gonsalves: 2024

==== All-Conference teams ====
First Team All-Atlantic Hockey

- 2007–08: Dan Ringwald, D; Simon Lambert, F
- 2008–09: Dan Ringwald, D; Brennan Sarazin, F
- 2009–10: Jared DeMichiel, G; Dan Ringwald, D
- 2010–11: Shane Madolora, G
- 2011–12: Shane Madolora, G
- 2012–13: Chris Saracino, D
- 2014–15: Matt Garbowsky, F
- 2015–16: Chase Norrish, D
- 2017–18: Erik Brown, F
- 2020–21: Dan Willett, D; Will Calverley, F
- 2021–22: Will Calverley, F
- 2022–23: Tommy Scarfone, G; Gianfranco Cassaro, D; Aiden Hansen-Bukata, D; Carter Wilkie, F
- 2023–24: Tommy Scarfone, G; Gianfranco Cassaro, D; Carter Wilkie, F; Cody Laskosky, F

Second Team All-Atlantic Hockey

- 2006–07: Brent Patry, D; Simon Lambert, F
- 2008–09: Bobby Raymond, F
- 2009–10: Andrew Favot, F
- 2010–11: Chris Saracino, D; Tyler Brenner, F
- 2011–12: Chris Haltigin, D; Michael Colavecchia, F
- 2014–15: Brady Norrish, D; Josh Mitchell, D
- 2016–17: Brady Norrish, D
- 2018–19: Abbott Girduckis, F
- 2019–20: Adam Brubacher, D
- 2023–24: Aiden Hansen-Bukata, D

Third Team All-Atlantic Hockey

- 2006–07: Louis Menard, G; Al Mazur, D
- 2007–08: Bobby Raymond, D
- 2008–09: Al Mazur, D
- 2009–10: Christopher Tanev, D; Cameron Burt, F
- 2010–11: Andrew Favot, F
- 2014–15: Alexander Kuqali, D; Brad McGowan, F
- 2015–16: Brady Norrish, D; Josh Mitchell, F
- 2017–18: Chase Norrish, D
- 2018–19: Adam Brubacher, D; Erik Brown, F
- 2019–20: Logan Drackett, G
- 2023–24: Elijah Gonsalves, F

Atlantic Hockey All-Rookie Team

- 2006–07: Louis Menard, G; Al Mazur, D; Anton Kharin, F
- 2008–09: Tyler Brenner, F
- 2009–10: Christopher Tanev, F
- 2014–15: Brady Norrish, F
- 2015–16: Gabriel Valenzuela, F
- 2016–17: Adam Brubacher, D
- 2019–20: Elijiah Gonsalves, F
- 2021–22: Tommy Scarfone, G; Carter Wilkie, F

=== Atlantic Hockey America ===
==== Individual awards ====
Rookie of the Year

- Zach Wigle (2026)

==== All-Conference teams ====
First Team All-Atlantic Hockey America

- 2024–25: Matthew Wilde, F

Second Team All-Atlantic Hockey America

- 2025–26: Jakub Krbecek, G

Third Team All-Atlantic Hockey America

- 2024–25: Tyler Fukakusa, F

All-Atlantic Hockey America Rookie Team

- 2025–26: Zach Wigle, F; Evan Konyen, F

== RIT Tigers Hall of Fame ==
The following is a list of people associated with the RIT men's ice hockey program who were elected into the RIT Tigers Hall of Fame (induction date in parentheses).

- 1982–83 Team (2018)
- 1984–85 Team (2018)
- William Bjorness (1999)
- Mike Bournazakis (2015)
- Scott Brown (1996)
- Stephen Burns (2016)
- Mark Dougherty (2016)
- Tyler Euverman (2011)
- Mark Gargiles (2015)
- Chet Hallice (2010)
- James Heffer (1991)
- Ritchie Herbert (2006)
- Simon Lambert (2014)
- Dennis Lepley (1983)
- Blaise MacDonald (1991)
- Tom Masaschi (2008)
- Chris Maybury (2007)
- Jay Murphy (2001)
- Chris Palmer (2005)
- Dan Ringwald (2016)
- Allan Shepard (2003)
- Daryl Sullivan (1992)
- Keith Vadas (1992)
- Al Vyverberg (2012)
- Len Williams (2004)

== Tigers in the NHL ==
As of July 1, 2025.

= NHL All-Star team	= NHL All-Star	= NHL All-Star and NHL All-Star team

Player	Position	Team(s)	Years	Games	Stanley Cups
Todd Krygier	Left Wing	HFD, WSH, ANA	1989–1998	543	0
Steve Pinizzotto	Forward	VAN, EDM	2012–2015	36	0
Christopher Tanev	Defenseman	VAN, CGY, DAL, TOR	2010–Present	867	0

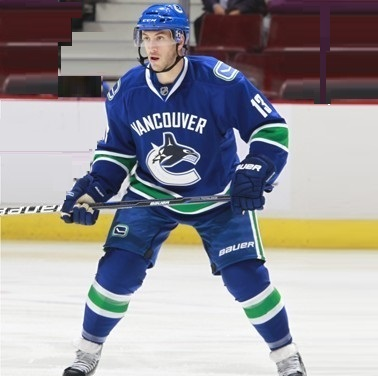
Steve Pinizzotto

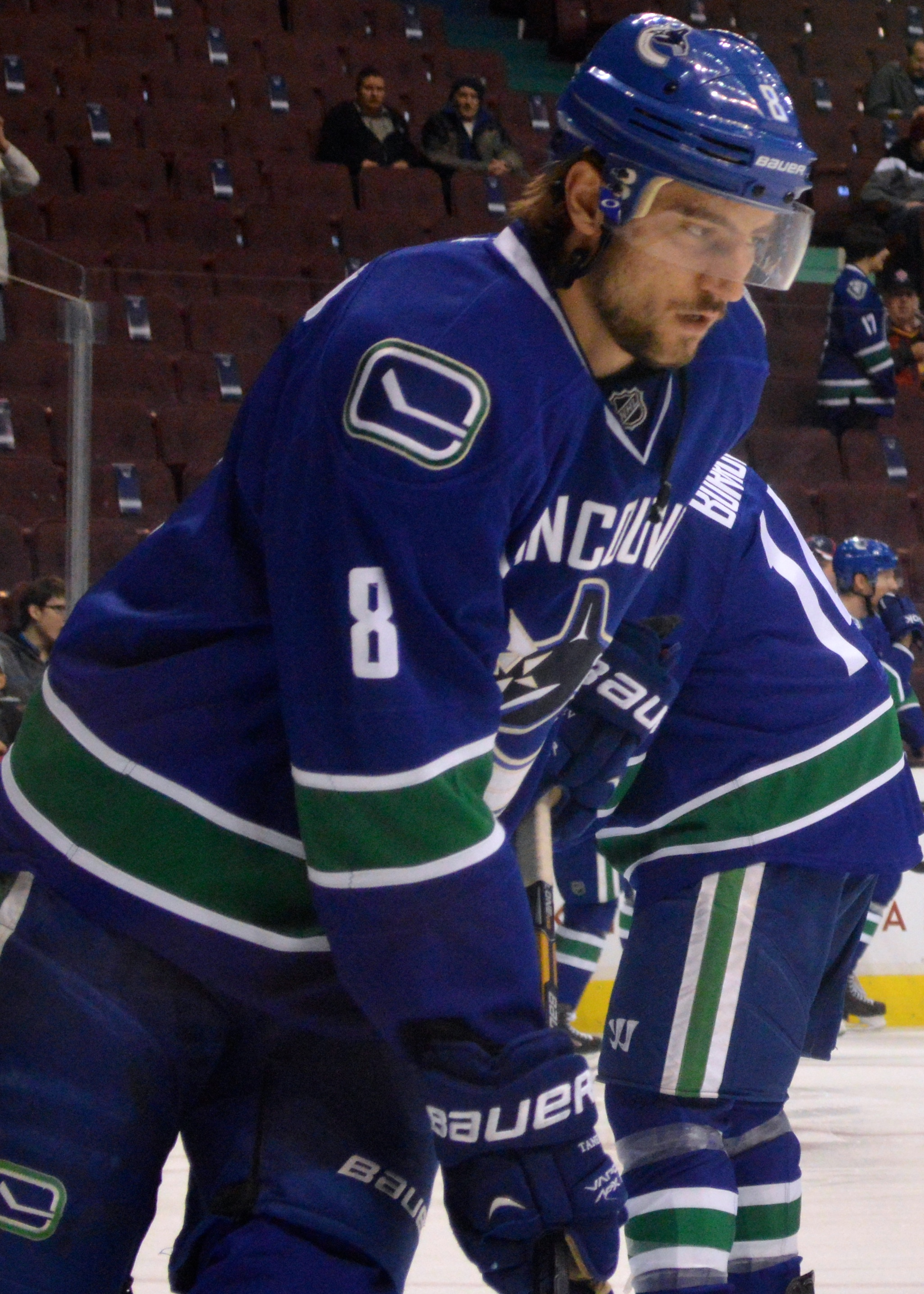
Christopher Tanev

== See also ==
- Category:RIT Tigers men's ice hockey players
- RIT Tigers women's ice hockey
