= 2014 Atlantic Hockey men's ice hockey tournament =

2014 Atlantic Hockey Men's ice hockey tournament
- Dates: March 7–22, 2014
- Teams: 12
- Finals site: Blue Cross Arena; Rochester, New York
- Champions: Robert Morris (1st title)
- Winning coach: Derek Schooley (1st title)
- MVP: Cody Wydo (Robert Morris)
- Atlantic Hockey Men's Ice Hockey Tournaments

The 2014 Atlantic Hockey Tournament is the 10th Atlantic Hockey Tournament. It was played between March 7 and March 22, 2014, at campus locations and at the Blue Cross Arena in Rochester, New York. The winner of the tournament was the Robert Morris Colonials, who earned Atlantic Hockey's automatic bid to the 2014 NCAA Division I Men's Ice Hockey Tournament.

== Format ==
The tournament features four rounds of play. In the first round the fifth and twelfth, sixth and eleventh, seventh and tenth, and eighth and ninth seeds, as determined by the conference regular-season standings, played a best-of-three series with the winners advancing to the quarterfinals. The top four teams from the conference regular-season standings received a bye to the quarterfinals. There, the first seed and lowest-ranked first-round winner, the second seed and second-lowest-ranked first-round winner, the third seed and second-highest-ranked first-round winner, and the fourth seed and the highest-ranked first-round winner played a best-of-three series, with the winners advancing to the semifinals. In the semifinals, the highest and lowest seeds and second-highest and second-lowest seeds played a single game each, with the winners advancing to the championship game. The tournament champion received an automatic bid to the 2014 NCAA Division I Men's Ice Hockey Tournament.

=== Standings ===
Note: GP = Games played; W = Wins; L = Losses; T = Ties; PTS = Points; GF = Goals For; GA = Goals Against

2013–14 Atlantic Hockey standings
	Conference record							Overall record					
	GP	W	L	T	PTS	GF	GA	GP	W	L	T	GF	GA
Mercyhurst^{†}	27	17	4	6	40	107	65	41	21	13	7	148	124
Bentley	27	16	7	4	36	100	67	37	19	14	4	127	99
Air Force	27	15	9	3	33	81	73	39	21	14	4	115	106
Connecticut	27	15	9	3	33	75	61	36	18	14	4	91	86
Robert Morris*	27	13	9	5	31	95	78	42	19	18	5	145	130
Niagara	27	11	11	5	27	89	78	40	15	20	5	113	122
Canisius	27	11	13	3	25	81	78	41	17	21	3	120	125
Holy Cross	27	11	13	3	25	68	72	39	14	22	3	97	114
RIT	27	10	14	3	23	67	84	37	12	20	5	94	124
Sacred Heart	27	11	16	0	22	75	99	36	12	24	0	82	137
American International	27	9	17	1	19	74	107	36	10	25	1	90	151
Army	27	5	22	0	10	60	110	34	6	28	0	73	146
Championship: Robert Morris † indicates conference regular season champion; * indicates conference tournament champion Rankings: USCHO.com Top 20 Poll; updated March 23, 2014

== Bracket ==
First round March 7–9
5	Robert Morris	8	2	3
12	Army	4	4	1
6	Niagara	1**	4	—
11	American International	0	2	—
7	Canisius	3	5	—
10	Sacred Heart	0	0	—
8	Holy Cross	2	5	3*
9	RIT	3*	1	2

Quarterfinals; March 14–16
1	Mercyhurst	5*	4	—
8	Holy Cross	4	1	—
2	Bentley	4*	4	2
7	Canisius	3	5**	3
3	Air Force	2	3	3
6	Niagara	1	4	4*
4	Connecticut	0	2	—
5	Robert Morris	3	3	—

Semifinals; March 21
1	Mercyhurst	4
7	Canisius	5**
5	Robert Morris	5*
6	Niagara	4

Championship; March 22
7	Canisius	4
5	Robert Morris	7

Note: * denotes overtime period(s)

== Results ==
=== First round ===
==== (5) Robert Morris vs. (12) Army ====
March 7	Robert Morris	8 – 4	Army	84 Lumber Arena	Recap
No Scoring		First period	16:44 - PP - Andrew O'Leary (Zaremba, Gehrt)
(Friedmann, Jones) Colin South - 01:53 (Rey, Gibson) Brandon Denham - 02:12 (Gibson, Denham) Matt Cope - 04:16 (Moore, Wydo) Scott Jacklin - 06:21 (Golightly, Renwick) Cody Wydo - GW - 09:19 (Rigatti) Daniel Leavens - 11:56		Second period	No scoring
(Jacklin, Wydo) Zac Lynch - 00:32 (Jacklin, Lynch) Cody Wydo - PP - 02:15		Third period	11:06 - Luke Jenkins (Richards, Lalor); 18:48 - PP - Maurice Alvarez (Reuschlein, Roberts); 19:47 - Garret Peterson (O'Leary)
( 18 saves / 22 shots ) Terry Shafer		Goalie stats	Parker Gahagen ( 16 saves / 21 shots ) / Tanner Creel ( 31 saves / 34 shots )

March 8	Robert Morris	2 – 4	Army	84 Lumber Arena	Recap
No Scoring		First period	01:05 - Brian Schultz (Pomarico, Hearn)
(Wydo, Blazek) Scott Jacklin - 09:51 (Lynch, Blazek) Scott Jacklin - PP - 19:13		Second period	01:27 - PP - Jonny Gehrt (Kozlak, Reuschlein); 04:38 - GW - Brian Schultz (Reuschlein, Roberts); 14:28 - Maurice Alvarez (Pomarico, Reuschlein)
No scoring		Third period	No scoring
( 26 saves / 30 shots ) Terry Shafer		Goalie stats	Parker Gahagen ( 34 saves / 36 shots )

March 9	Robert Morris	3 – 1	Army	84 Lumber Arena	Recap
No Scoring		First period	No scoring
(Cope) Greg Gibson - 04:44 (Golightly, Renwick) David Friedmann - GW - 11:34		Second period	02:02 - SH - Luke Jenkins (unassisted)
(Lynch) Andrew Blazek - 05:42		Third period	No scoring
( 10 saves / 11 shots ) Terry Shafer / ( 15 saves / 15 shots ) Dalton Izyk		Goalie stats	Parker Gahagen ( 28 saves / 31 shots )

Robert Morris won series 2–1

==== (6) Niagara vs. (11) American International ====
March 7	Niagara	1 – 0	2OT	American International	Dwyer Arena	Recap
No Scoring		First period		No scoring
No scoring		Second period		No scoring
No scoring		Third period		No scoring
(Muto) Dan Kolenda - GW - 04:43		Second overtime period		No scoring
( 38 saves / 38 shots ) Jackson Teichroeb		Goalie stats		Hunter Leisner ( 48 saves / 49 shots )

March 8	Niagara	4 – 2	American International	Dwyer Arena	Recap
(Rashid) Sam Alfieri - 04:36 (Alfieri, Williams) Matt Chartrain - 08:18 (Akeson, Muto) Ryan Rashid - GW PP - 15:33		First period	No scoring
(Sarcona, Pietrobon) Matt Williams - 04:02		Second period	No scoring
No scoring		Third period	00:41 - David Norris (MacMillan, Puskar); 11:34 - David Norris (MacMillan)
( 29 saves / 31 shots ) Jackson Teichroeb		Goalie stats	Hunter Leisner ( 24 saves / 28 shots )

Niagara won series 2–0

==== (7) Canisius vs. (10) Sacred Heart ====
March 7	Canisius	3 – 0	Bentley	Buffalo State Sports Arena	Recap
No Scoring		First period	No scoring
(Danford, Gibbons) Shane Conacher - GW PP - 02:12		Second period	No scoring
(Law, McCrank) Tyler Wiseman - 06:22 (Backhouse, Freeman) Kyle Gibbons - EN - 18:07		Third period	No scoring
( 27 saves / 27 shots ) Tony Capobianco		Goalie stats	Alex Vazzano ( 25 saves / 27 shots )

March 8	Canisius	5 – 0	Bentley	Buffalo State Sports Arena	Recap
(Sullivan, Bohrer) Ralph Cuddemi - GW - 13:23		First period	No scoring
(unassisted) Cody Freeman - SH - 04:59 (Roe) Braeden Rigney - 11:33		Second period	No scoring
(Gibbons, Sullivan) Cody Freeman - 06:20 (Danford, Gibbons) Cody Freeman - 14:25		Third period	No scoring
( 31 saves / 31 shots ) Tony Capobianco		Goalie stats	Alex Vazzano ( 26 saves / 31 shots )

Canisius won series 2–0

==== (8) Holy Cross vs. (9) RIT ====
March 7	Holy Cross	2 – 3	OT	RIT	Hart Center	Recap
(Schmidt, Smith) Brett Lubanski - PP - 18:37		First period		10:23 - Greg Noyes (Mitchell, Lynch)
No scoring		Second period		11:41 - Adam Mitchell (Smith, Kuqali)
(McNamara, Vidal) Shayne Stockton - 12:44		Third period		No scoring
No scoring		First overtime period		13:23 - GW - Brad McGowan (Noyes)
( 45 saves / 48 shots ) Matt Ginn		Goalie stats		Mike Rotolo ( 36 saves / 38 shots )

March 8	Holy Cross	5 – 1	RIT	Hart Center	Recap
(Schmidt, Barrett) Tim Driscoll - 00:47 (unassisted) Shayne Stockton - GW - 02:14 (McGrath, Lubanski) Castan Sommer - 12:56		First period	No scoring
(McGrath, Sommer) Brett Lubanski - EA - 10:16		Second period	No scoring
(Vidal) Shayne Stockton - 13:38		Third period	03:51 - PP - Dan Schuler (Lynch, Noyes)
( 29 saves / 30 shots ) Matt Ginn		Goalie stats	Mike Rotolo ( 27 saves / 32 shots )

March 9	Holy Cross	3 – 2	OT	RIT	Hart Center	Recap
No Scoring		First period		10:23 - Eliot Raibl (Miller, McGowan)
(Stockton, Nagy) Adam Schmidt - 04:08 (Youso) Tommy Dwyer - 08:37		Second period		03:00 - Danny Smith (Fostvelt)
No scoring		Third period		No scoring
(Schmidt) Mike Barrett - GW - 00:38		First overtime period		No scoring
( 31 saves / 33 shots ) Matt Ginn		Goalie stats		Mike Rotolo ( 39 saves / 42 shots )

Holy Cross won series 2–1

=== Quarterfinals ===
==== (1) Mercyhurst vs. (8) Holy Cross ====
March 14	Mercyhurst	5 – 4	OT	Holy Cross	Mercyhurst Ice Center	Recap
No Scoring		First period		08:54 - PP - Brett McKinnon (Barrett, Stockton)
(Frischmon, Shields) Kyle Cook - 14:26 (O'Donoghue, Zay) Nick Jones - 19:21		Second period		00:30 - Brett McKinnon (McNamara, Beckman); 05:11 - Ryan McGrath (Sommer, Youso); 19:36 - Castan Sommer (Lubanski, Beckman)
(Nagtzaam, Mastrodicasa) Tyler Shiplo - PP - 07:03 (Bahntge, Hrehoriak) Daniel O'Donoghue - EA - 19:33		Third period		No scoring
(Misiak, Mastrodicasa) Kyle Cook - GW - 04:40		First overtime period		No scoring
( 34 saves / 38 shots ) Jimmy Sarjeant		Goalie stats		Matt Ginn ( 45 saves / 50 shots )

March 15	Mercyhurst	4 – 1	Holy Cross	Mercyhurst Ice Center	Recap
(Bahntge, O'Donoghue) Nick Jones - 02:27		First period	No scoring
(Frischmon, Bodo) Alec Shields - 02:41 (O'Donoghue, Shiplo) Matthew Zay - 15:20		Second period	No scoring
(Hrehoriak, Just) Ryan Misiak - 15:46		Third period	16:52 - Mike Barrett (Smith, Driscoll)
( 45 saves / 46 shots ) Jimmy Sarjeant		Goalie stats	Matt Ginn ( 32 saves / 36 shots )

Mercyhurst won series 2–0

==== (2) Bentley vs. (7) Canisius ====
March 14	Bentley	4 – 3	OT	Canisius	John A. Ryan Arena	Recap
(Weinstein, Gensler) Alex Grieve - PP - 02:46 (Reardon, Fitzstephens) Derek Bacon - 08:48		First period		13:46 - Patrick Sullivan (Freeman, Gibbons)
No scoring		Second period		No scoring
(Grieve, Switzer) Brett Gensler - EA - 19:37		Third period		03:39 - Tyler Wiseman (Law, Jessey); 05:59 - Patrick Sullivan (Law, Wiseman)
(Gensler, Blomquist) Brett Switzer - GW - 00:40		First overtime period		No scoring
( 27 saves / 30 shots ) Branden Komm		Goalie stats		Tony Capobianco ( 27 saves / 31 shots )

March 15	Bentley	4 – 5	2OT	Canisius	John A. Ryan Arena	Recap
(Grieve) Brett Gensler - 09:46 (Weinstein) Tyler Deresky - 19:07		First period		No scoring
(Grieve, Gensler) Brett Switzer - 07:08 (Gensler, Weinstein) Alex Grieve - 18:30		Second period		01:34 - Ralph Cuddemi (Conacher, McCrank)
No scoring		Third period		05:15 - Ben Danford (Backhouse, Gibbons); 11:19 - PP - Ralph Cuddemi (Danford, Conacher); 15:55 - Shane Conacher (Jessey, McCrank)
No scoring		Second overtime period		06:59 - GW - Kyle Gibbons (Wiseman, Backhouse)
( 40 saves / 45 shots ) Branden Komm		Goalie stats		Tony Capobianco ( 42 saves / 46 shots )

March 16	Bentley	2 – 3	Canisius	John A. Ryan Arena	Recap
(Weinstein, Blomquist) Brett Gensler - 11:06 (Gensler, Gladiuk) Alex Grieve - 18:05		First period	11:56 - Mitch McCrank (Danford)
No scoring		Second period	03:59 - Mitch McCrank (Jessey, Rumble)
No scoring		Third period	08:52 - Mitch McCrank (Cuddemi, Conacher)
( 29 saves / 32 shots ) Branden Komm		Goalie stats	Tony Capobianco ( 38 saves / 40 shots )

Canisius won series 2–1

==== (3) Air Force vs. (6) Niagara ====
March 14	Air Force	2 – 1	Niagara	Cadet Ice Arena	Recap
No Scoring		First period	No scoring
(Demers, Halloran) Cole Gunner - 06:28 (Michalke) Max Hartner - GW - 09:43		Second period	06:58 - Patrick Divjak (unassisted)
No scoring		Third period	No scoring
( 26 saves / 27 shots ) Jason Torf		Goalie stats	Jackson Teichroeb ( 35 saves / 37 shots )

March 15	Air Force	3 – 4	Niagara	Cadet Ice Arena	Recap
No Scoring		First period	13:43 - Hugo Turcotte (Ryan, Conderman)
(Holm, Gunner) Chad Demers - 04:14 (Thomas, Michalke) Ben Carey - 12:25		Second period	02:43 - Vinny Muto (Williams, Turcotte); 14:43 - Hugo Turcotte (Kolenda, Patterson)
(unassisted) Patrick Conte - 01:44		Third period	11:40 - GW - Ryan Timar (Michalke, Torrel)
( 29 saves / 33 shots ) Jason Torf		Goalie stats	Jackson Teichroeb ( 23 saves / 26 shots )

March 16	Air Force	3 – 4	OT	Niagara	Cadet Ice Arena	Recap
(McKenzie, Holm) Alex Halloran - PP - 08:42 (Fabian, Halloran) George Michalke - 13:28		First period		05:23 - Michael Benedict (Albers, Conte); 12:56 - Stephen Pietrobon (unassisted)
No scoring		Second period		16:16 - Patrick Conte (Williams, Nasca)
(Michalke, Hrabovsky) Ryan Timar - 06:29		Third period		No scoring
No scoring		First overtime period		04:49 - GW - Matt Williams (Sarcona)
( 27 saves / 31 shots ) Jason Torf		Goalie stats		Jackson Teichroeb ( 31 saves / 34 shots )

Niagara won series 2–1

==== (4) Connecticut vs. (5) Robert Morris ====
March 14	Connecticut	0 – 3	Robert Morris	Freitas Ice Forum	Recap
No Scoring		First period	No scoring
No scoring		Second period	19:14 - GW - Jeff Jones (Blazek, Friedmann)
No scoring		Third period	06:53 - Cody Wydo (Renwick); 18:18 - Brandon Denham (Gibson, Cope)
( 31 saves / 34 shots ) Rob Nichols		Goalie stats	Dalton Izyk ( 33 saves / 33 shots )

March 15	Connecticut	2 – 3	Robert Morris	Freitas Ice Forum	Recap
No Scoring		First period	No scoring
(Ferriss, Tyson) Tyler Cooke - 04:41 (Skibba, Gaffney) Trevor Gerling - 07:18		Second period	02:35 - PP - Zac Lynch (Wydo, Wilson); 07:42 - Evan Moore (Gibson, Blazek); 12:35 - GW - Ben Robillard (Rigatti, Golightly)
No scoring		Third period	No scoring
( 29 saves / 32 shots ) Matt Grogan		Goalie stats	Dalton Izyk ( 36 saves / 38 shots )

Robert Morris won series 2–0

=== Semifinals ===
==== (1) Mercyhurst vs. (7) Canisius ====
March 21	Mercyhurst	4 – 5	2OT	Canisius	Blue Cross Arena	Recap
(Monteith) Alec Shields - 09:40 (Just, O'Donoghue) Nick Jones - 17:34		First period		07:40 - Ralph Cuddemi (McCrank, McKellar)
(Frischmon, Shiplo) Alec Shields - 11:03		Second period		01:19 - Ralph Cuddemi (Conacher); 17:10 - Patrick Sullivan (Gibbons, Jessey)
(Zay, Bahntge) Daniel O'Donoghue - 11:48		Third period		06:51 - Mitch McCrank (Conacher, Backhouse)
No scoring		Second overtime period		13:30 - GW - Stephen Farrell (Roe, Cuddemi)
( 42 saves / 47 shots ) Jimmy Sarjeant		Goalie stats		Tony Capobianco ( 58 saves / 62 shots )

==== (5) Robert Morris vs. (6) Niagara ====
March 21	Robert Morris	5 – 4	OT	Niagara	Blue Cross Arena	Recap
(Cope) Greg Gibson - 02:56		First period		No scoring
(Denham, Golightly) Matt Cope - 09:30		Second period		03:39 - Hugo Turcotte (Kolenda, Albers)
(Friedmann, Jones) Colin South - 11:29 (Lynch, Jacklin) Cody Wydo - 12:29		Third period		08:32 - Stephen Pietrobon (Williams, Sarcona); 16:57 - Patrick Divjak (Williams, Sarcona); 17:44 - Hugo Turcotte (Williams, Conte)
(Lynch, Golightly) Scott Jacklin - GW - 14:56		First overtime period		No scoring
( 51 saves / 55 shots ) Dalton Izyk		Goalie stats		Jackson Teichroeb ( 38 saves / 43 shots )

=== Championship ===
==== (5) Robert Morris vs. (7) Canisius ====
March 22	Robert Morris	7 – 4	Canisius	Blue Cross Arena	Recap
No Scoring		First period	No scoring
(unassisted) Cody Wydo - 00:26 (Lynch, Izyk) Cody Wydo - 17:34		Second period	06:08 - Doug Jessey (Rumble, Beck)
(Rey, Denham) Greg Gibson - 01:31 (Rigatti, Golightly) Matt Cope - 07:11 (Lynch, Wydo) David Friedmann - GW - 11:04 (Blazek, Cope) Greg Gibson - 13:04 (Jacklin) Cody Wydo - 18:06		Third period	01:16 - Shane Conacher (McCrank, Jessey); 10:27 - Mitch McCrank (Cuddemi, Rumble); 12:35 - PP - Chris Rumble (Jessey, Beck)
( 27 saves / 31 shots ) Dalton Izyk		Goalie stats	Tony Capobianco ( 26 saves / 33 shots )

== Tournament awards ==
=== All-Tournament Team ===
- G Dalton Izyk (Robert Morris).
- D Doug Jessey (Canisius).
- D Chris Rumble (Canisius).
- F Ralph Cuddemi (Robert Morris).
- F Greg Gibson (Robert Morris).
- F Cody Wydo* (Robert Morris).

* Most Valuable Player(s)
