= 2015 Atlantic Hockey men's ice hockey tournament =

2015 Atlantic Hockey Men's ice hockey tournament
- Dates: March 6–21, 2015
- Teams: 11
- Finals site: Blue Cross Arena; Rochester, New York
- Champions: RIT (2nd title)
- Winning coach: Wayne Wilson (2nd title)
- MVP: Matt Garbowsky (RIT)
- Atlantic Hockey Men's Ice Hockey Tournaments

The 2015 Atlantic Hockey Tournament was the 11th Atlantic Hockey Tournament. It was played between March 6 and March 21, 2015, at campus locations and at the Blue Cross Arena in Rochester, New York. The tournament was won by the RIT Tigers. By winning the tournament, RIT earned Atlantic Hockey's automatic bid to the 2015 NCAA Division I Men's Ice Hockey Tournament.

== Format ==
The tournament format changed this year because the Connecticut Huskies left the league for Hockey East, leaving 11 teams. Under the new format, the top five (instead of four) seeds all receive a bye into the quarterfinals, but the fifth seed doesn't host a quarterfinal series.

The tournament features four rounds of play. In the first round the sixth and eleventh, seventh and tenth, and eighth and ninth seeds, as determined by the conference regular season standings, will play a best-of-three series with the winners advancing to the quarterfinals. The top five teams from the conference regular season standings receive a bye to the quarterfinals. There, the first seed and lowest-ranked first round winner, the second seed and second-highest-ranked first round winner, the third seed and highest-ranked first round winner, and the fourth seed and the fifth seed will play a best-of-three series, with the winners advancing to the semifinals. In the semifinals, the highest and lowest seeds and second-highest and second-lowest remaining seeds will play a single game each, with the winners advancing to the championship game. The tournament champion will receive an automatic bid to the 2015 NCAA Division I Men's Ice Hockey Tournament.

=== Standings ===
Note: GP = Games played; W = Wins; L = Losses; T = Ties; PTS = Points; GF = Goals For; GA = Goals Against

2014–15 Atlantic Hockey standings
	Conference record							Overall record					
	GP	W	L	T	PTS	GF	GA	GP	W	L	T	GF	GA
Robert Morris †	28	19	5	4	42	106	66	37	24	8	5	133	90
Canisius	28	15	7	6	36	78	60	37	18	12	7	95	82
#16 RIT *	28	14	9	5	33	90	62	40	20	15	5	121	96
Bentley	28	14	9	5	33	76	67	37	17	15	5	100	92
Mercyhurst	28	14	11	3	31	90	87	39	19	16	4	116	122
Holy Cross	28	12	11	5	29	68	61	37	14	18	5	84	87
Air Force	28	13	12	3	29	82	82	41	16	21	4	119	130
Sacred Heart	28	10	12	6	26	77	82	38	13	19	6	96	113
Army	28	8	16	4	20	60	84	34	8	22	4	68	108
American International	28	4	17	7	15	69	107	36	4	25	7	87	155
Niagara	28	5	19	4	14	65	103	39	7	28	4	85	157
Championship: March 21, 2015 † indicates conference regular season champion; * indicates conference tournament champion Rankings: USCHO.com Top 20 Poll; updated March 23, 2015

== Bracket ==
RIT and Bentley finished tied for third place; RIT is the third seed based on the third tiebreaker (head-to-head goal differential). Air Force and Holy Cross finished tied for sixth place; Holy Cross is the sixth seed based on the first tiebreaker (head-to-head results).

First round March 6–8
6	Holy Cross	1	2***	3
11	Niagara	2	1	5
7	Air Force	6	10	—
10	American International	1	3	—
8	Sacred Heart	2	5	—
9	Army	0	2	—

Quarterfinals; March 13–15
1	Robert Morris	4	6	—
11	Niagara	2	3	—
2	Canisius	2	2	—
8	Sacred Heart	0	1	—
3	RIT	2	7	—
7	Air Force	1	3	—
4	Bentley	0	5	2
5	Mercyhurst	1*	3	3

Semifinals; March 20
1	Robert Morris	3
5	Mercyhurst	4*
2	Canisius	1
3	RIT	2

Championship; March 21
3	RIT	5
5	Mercyhurst	1

Note: * denotes overtime period(s)

== Results ==
=== First round ===
==== (6) Holy Cross vs. (11) Niagara ====
March 6	Holy Cross	1 – 2	Niagara	Hart Center	Recap
No Scoring		First period	No scoring
(Bolton, Barrett) Matt Scarth - PP - 12:04		Second period	No scoring
No scoring		Third period	04:29 - Kevin Patterson (Angiolella, Pietrobon); 10:10 - GW - Luke Edwards (Pietrobon, Angiolella)
( 28 saves / 30 shots ) Matt Ginn		Goalie stats	Jackson Teichroeb ( 31 saves / 32 shots )

March 7	Holy Cross	2 – 1	3OT	Niagara	Hart Center	Recap
(Moore, Barrett) Matt Scarth - PP - 05:56		First period		No scoring
No scoring		Second period		01:00 - Stanislav Dzakhov (Sarcona, Smith)
No scoring		Third period		No scoring
(McNamara, Pooley) T. J. Moore - GW - 11:40		Third overtime period		No scoring
( 50 saves / 51 shots ) Matt Ginn		Goalie stats		Jackson Teichroeb ( 58 saves / 60 shots )

March 8	Holy Cross	3 – 5	Niagara	Hart Center	Recap
No Scoring		First period	03:48 - Larry Smith (unassisted)
(Moore, Pooley) Mike Barrett - 01:30 (Nagy, Youso) Tommy Dwyer - 13:34 (Beckman) Brett Lubanski - 15:15		Second period	04:54 - PP - Kevin Patterson (Sarcona); 12:28 - PP - Keegan Harper (Sarcona, Patterson)
No scoring		Third period	02:03 - GW PP - Chris Lochner (Muto, Smith); 19:10 - EN - Hugo Turcotte (Kolenda)
( 21 saves / 25 shots ) Matt Ginn		Goalie stats	Jackson Teichroeb ( 47 saves / 50 shots )

Niagara won series 2–1

==== (7) Air Force vs. (10) American International ====
March 6	Air Force	6 – 1	American International	Cadet Ice Arena	Recap
(Baskin, Ledford) A. J. Reid - 04:32 (Himley, Vosejpka) Ben Kucera - GW - 12:02 (Demers, Weissenhofer) Scott Holm - 12:47		First period	16:22 - Austin Orszulak (May, MacMillan)
(Hartner, Kucera) Ben Carey - 05:59 (Gunner, Rostenkowski) Scott Holm - 06:37		Second period	No scoring
(Reid, Ledford) Phil Boje - PP - 01:20		Third period	No scoring
( 24 saves / 25 shots ) Chris Truehl		Goalie stats	Alex Murray ( 28 saves / 34 shots ) / Jacob Caffrey ( 2 saves / 2 shots )

March 7	Air Force	10 – 3	American International	Cadet Ice Arena	Recap
(unassisted) Chad Demers - 01:11 (Carey, Holm) Cole Gunner - 17:06 (Gunner, Weissenhofer) Chad Demers - 18:32		First period	No scoring
(Kucera, Weissenhofer) Cole Gunner - GW PP - 00:54 (unassisted) Ben Carey - 12:05 (Reid, Ledford) Cole Gunner - 14:22		Second period	01:08 - Johno May (Orszulak)
(Hartner, Abood) Ben Carey - 01:37 (Ledford, Abood) A. J. Reid - 02:17 (Ledford, Baskin) Phil Boje - 06:51 (Carey) Cole Gunner - 08:57		Third period	13:11 - Nathan Sliwinski (May, Debrincat); 16:51 - Johno May (Gandara)
( 21 saves / 22 shots ) Chris Truehl / ( 8 saves / 10 shots ) Connor Girard		Goalie stats	Hunter Leisner ( 15 saves / 19 shots ) / Alex Murray ( 23 saves / 28 shots ) / Jacob Caffrey ( 9 saves / 10 shots )

Air Force won series 2–0

==== (8) Sacred Heart vs. (9) Army ====
March 6	Sacred Heart	2 – 0	Army	Milford Ice Pavilion	Recap
No Scoring		First period	No scoring
(Luczyk, Doerksen) Alec Butcher - GW - 06:16		Second period	No scoring
(Sabatini, Butcher) Evan Jasper - 16:05		Third period	No scoring
( 20 saves / 20 shots ) Alex Vazzano		Goalie stats	Parker Gahagen ( 26 saves / 28 shots )

March 7	Sacred Heart	5 – 2	Army	Milford Ice Pavilion	Recap
No Scoring		First period	No scoring
(Brightbill, Minello) Ben Lake - 04:27 (Nylen) Brian Sheehan - 05:54 (Rayner, Kennedy) Alec Butcher - GW - 09:40		Second period	No scoring
(George, Doherty) Justin Danforth - 03:03 (Kennedy, Nylen) Jordan Minello - EN - 18:17		Third period	02:34 - PP - Mac Lalor (Alvarez, Pham); 15:07 - Brendan McGuire (Llaurado)
( 23 saves / 25 shots ) Alex Vazzano		Goalie stats	Parker Gahagen ( 31 saves / 35 shots )

Sacred Heart won series 2–0

=== Quarterfinals ===
==== (1) Robert Morris vs. (11) Niagara ====
March 13	Robert Morris	4 – 2	Niagara	84 Lumber Arena	Recap
(Cope, Denham) Scott Jacklin - 08:17		First period	16:47 - Patrick Conte (Edwards, Turcotte); 17:37 - PP - Kevin Patterson (Kohls, Harper)
(Jones) Timmy Moore - 03:05		Second period	No scoring
(Wilson, Jones) Spencer Dorowicz - GW - 02:48 (Gibson, Cope) Brandon Denham - EN - 18:44		Third period	No scoring
( 38 saves / 40 shots ) Dalton Izyk		Goalie stats	Jackson Teichroeb ( 36 saves / 39 shots )

March 14	Robert Morris	6 – 3	Niagara	84 Lumber Arena	Recap
(Rey, Lynch) Greg Gibson - 03:33 (Jacklin, Wilson) Zac Lynch - PP - 18:44 (Wydo, Wilson) Scott Jacklin - PP - 19:34		First period	14:10 - Hugo Turcotte (Kolenda, Harper)
No scoring		Second period	01:46 - Matt Chiarantano (Lochner, Turcotte); 09:05 - Keegan Harper (Conte, Nasca)
(unassisted) Zac Lynch - GW SH - 04:30 (Denham, Rey) Greg Gibson - 07:48 (Ferguson) David Friedmann - EN - 17:08		Third period	No scoring
( 30 saves / 33 shots ) Dalton Izyk		Goalie stats	Jackson Teichroeb ( 38 saves / 43 shots )

Robert Morris won series 2–0

==== (2) Canisius vs. (8) Sacred Heart ====
March 13	Canisius	2 – 0	Sacred Heart	Harborcenter	Recap
(Murray, Sheeran) Jack Stander - GW - 14:58 (Stander, McCrank) Ralph Cuddemi - 19:15		First period	No scoring
No scoring		Second period	No scoring
No scoring		Third period	No scoring
( 19 saves / 19 shots ) Keegan Asmundson		Goalie stats	Alex Vazzano ( 16 saves / 18 shots )

March 14	Canisius	2 – 1	Sacred Heart	Harborcenter	Recap
(Roe, Murray) Cody Freeman - 01:22		First period	No scoring
No scoring		Second period	No scoring
(Freeman, Cuddemi) Chris Rumble - 02:40		Third period	05:03 - Drew George (Danforth)
( 32 saves / 33 shots ) Keegan Asmundson		Goalie stats	Alex Vazzano ( 12 saves / 14 shots )

Canisius won series 2–0

==== (3) RIT vs. (7) Air Force ====
March 13	RIT	2 – 1	Air Force	Gene Polisseni Center	Recap
No Scoring		First period	No scoring
(Norrish, McGowan) Matt Garbowsky - PP - 15:19		Second period	14:14 - PP - Chad Demers (Rostenkowski, Holm)
(Abt, Kuqali) Josh Mitchell - GW PP - 04:57		Third period	No scoring
( 25 saves / 26 shots ) Jordan Ruby		Goalie stats	Chris Truehl ( 22 saves / 24 shots )

March 14	RIT	7 – 3	Air Force	Gene Polisseni Center	Recap
No Scoring		First period	No scoring
(Garbowsky, Norrish) Brad McGowan - PP - 00:49 (Norrish, Mitchell) Matt Garbowsky - PP - 13:57		Second period	09:02 - PP - Ben Kucera (Reid, Baskin)
(Skirving) Brad McGowan - 00:27 (Mitchell, Norrish) Brad McGowan - GW - 08:17 (Kuqali, Garbowsky) Josh Mitchell - EN - 14:34 (Mitchell, Norrish) Brad McGowan - EN - 16:24 (Kuqali, Golberg) Myles Powell - PP - 18:01		Third period	16:05 - PP EA - Cole Gunner (Weissenhofer); 19:52 - Max Hartner (McDonald, Michalke)
( 24 saves / 27 shots ) Jordan Ruby		Goalie stats	Chris Truehl ( 36 saves / 41 shots )

RIT won series 2–0

==== (4) Bentley vs. (5) Mercyhurst ====
March 13	Bentley	0 – 1	OT	Mercyhurst	John A. Ryan Arena	Recap
No Scoring		First period		No scoring
No scoring		Second period		No scoring
No scoring		Third period		No scoring
No scoring		First overtime period		04:46 - GW - Ryan Misiak (Bahntge, Shiplo)
( 27 saves / 28 shots ) Jayson Argue		Goalie stats		Brandon Wildung ( 40 saves / 40 shots )

March 14	Bentley	5 – 3	Mercyhurst	John A. Ryan Arena	Recap
No Scoring		First period	19:35 - Chris Bodo (Misiak, Shiplo)
(Eiserman, McDonald) Alex Grieve - 01:16 (Gladiuk, Blomquist) Max French - PP - 02:17 (Buchanan, Maher) Kyle Schmidt - 03:57 (McDonald, Grieve) Kyle Schmidt - GW - 11:59		Second period	No scoring
(unassisted) Kyle Schmidt - EN - 18:24		Third period	06:10 - PP - Kyle Just (Bahntge, Zay); 19:54 - EA - Chris Bodo (Bahntge, Just)
( 26 saves / 29 shots ) Jayson Argue		Goalie stats	Brandon Wildung ( 25 saves / 29 shots ) / Spencer Bacon ( 7 saves / 7 shots )

March 15	Bentley	2 – 3	Mercyhurst	John A. Ryan Arena	Recap
(Gladiuk, McDonald) Matt Blomquist - 05:25		First period	No scoring
No scoring		Second period	No scoring
(Switzer, French) Andrew Gladiuk - 03:23		Third period	12:12 - Matthew Zay (Bahntge, Todd); 12:26 - Chris Bodo (Nagtzaam, Frischmon); 19:54 - GW - Nardo Nagtzaam (Frischmon, Bodo)
( 32 saves / 35 shots ) Jayson Argue		Goalie stats	Brandon Wildung ( 35 saves / 37 shots )

Mercyhurst won series 2–1

=== Semifinals ===
==== (1) Robert Morris vs. (5) Mercyhurst ====
March 20	Robert Morris	3 – 4	OT	Mercyhurst	Blue Cross Arena	Recap
(Jacklin, Wydo) Zac Lynch - PP - 08:12		First period		04:47 - PP - Kyle Just (Mastrodicasa, Bahntge); 06:50 - PP - Ryan Misiak (Nagtzaam, Shiplo)
(Gibson, Wilson) Cody Wydo - 19:19		Second period		No scoring
(Rey, Denham) Scott Jacklin - 14:41		Third period		19:25 - EA - Chris Bodo (Zay, Just)
No scoring		First overtime period		03:04 - GW - Zac Frischmon (Nagtzaam, Mastrodicasa)
( 25 saves / 29 shots ) Dalton Izyk		Goalie stats		Brandon Wildung ( 59 saves / 62 shots )

==== (2) Canisius vs. (3) RIT ====
March 20	Canisius	1 – 2	RIT	Blue Cross Arena	Recap
No Scoring		First period	19:37 - Brad McGowan (Garbowsky)
(Jessey, Cuddemi) Shane Conacher - 10:07		Second period	15:15 - GW - Danny Smith (Miller, Abt)
No scoring		Third period	No scoring
( 25 saves / 27 shots ) Keegan Asmundson		Goalie stats	Jordan Ruby ( 27 saves / 28 shots )

=== Championship ===
==== (3) RIT vs. (5) Mercyhurst ====
March 21	RIT	5 – 1	Mercyhurst	Blue Cross Arena	Recap
No Scoring		First period	No scoring
(Golberg, Cameron) Matt Abt - 02:03 (Garbowsky, McGowan) Josh Mitchell - GW - 09:51		Second period	No scoring
(Norrish, Kuqali) Andrew Miller - 14:55 (Mitchell, Garbowsky) Brad McGowan - 17:21 (Mitchell, Norrish) Brad McGowan - EN - 18:42		Third period	02:55 - Stephen Hrehoriak (Gettinger, Sienerth)
( 27 saves / 28 shots ) Jordan Ruby		Goalie stats	Brandon Wildung ( 31saves / 35 shots )

== Tournament awards ==
=== All-Tournament Team ===
- G Brandon Wildung (Mercyhurst)
- D Brady Norrish (RIT)
- D Matt Abt (RIT)
- F Matt Garbowsky* (RIT)
- F Brad McGowan (RIT)
- F Andrew Miller (RIT)

* Most Valuable Player(s)
