= Cole Harbour (electoral district) =

Provincial electoral district in Nova Scotia, Canada

Nova Scotia electoral district

Provincial electoral district
- Legislature: Nova Scotia House of Assembly
MLA
Leah Martin
Progressive Conservative
- District created: 1978
- First contested: 1978
- Last contested: 2024

Demographics
- Population (2011): 19,934
- Electors: 15,720
- Area (km²): 14
- Pop. density (per km²): 1,423.9
- Census division: Halifax Regional Municipality
- Census subdivision: Halifax Regional Municipality

Cole Harbour is a provincial electoral district in Nova Scotia, Canada, that elects one member of the Nova Scotia House of Assembly.

In 1978, Halifax Cobequid was divided into four separate ridings, one of which was named Cole Harbour. Upon the recommendations of the 1992 Electoral Boundaries Report, the riding was split into Cole Harbour-Eastern Passage and Dartmouth-Cole Harbour. The district of Cole Harbour was re-created in the 2003 redistribution and was composed of 78 percent of Dartmouth-Cole Harbour and 29 percent of Cole Harbour-Eastern Passage. In 2012, following the Electoral Boundaries Commission review, this district was renamed Cole Harbour-Portland Valley and it lost a portion of the Westphal area to Preston-Dartmouth and gained the area east of Bell Lake from Dartmouth East and the Portland Hills area from Dartmouth South-Portland Valley. Following the 2019 electoral boundary review, the riding reverted to its former name of Cole Harbour, while losing territory to the new riding of Cole Harbour-Dartmouth, exchanging some territory with Preston-Dartmouth (renamed Preston) and gaining territory from Eastern Shore and Cole Harbour-Eastern Passage.

== Geography ==
The land area of Cole Harbour is 14 km^{2} (5.4 sq mi).

== Members of the Legislative Assembly ==
This riding has elected the following members of the Legislative Assembly:

Cole Harbour
Legislature	Years	Member	Party
Riding created from Halifax Eastern Shore
52nd	1978–1981	David Nantes	Progressive Conservative
53rd	1981–1984	David Nantes	Progressive Conservative
54th	1984–1988	David Nantes	Progressive Conservative
55th	1988–1993	David Nantes	Progressive Conservative
Riding dissolved into Cole Harbour-Eastern Passage and Dartmouth-Cole Harbour
Riding re-created from Cole Harbour-Eastern Passage and Dartmouth-Cole Harbour
59th	2003–2006	Darrell Dexter	New Democratic
60th	2006–2009	Darrell Dexter	New Democratic
61st	2009–2013	Darrell Dexter	New Democratic
62nd	2013–2017	Tony Ince	Liberal
63rd	2017–2021	Tony Ince	Liberal
64th	2021–present	Tony Ince	Liberal
65th	2024–present	Leah Martin	Progressive Conservative

== Election results ==
=== 2024 ===
2024 Nova Scotia general election
Party	Candidate	Votes	%	±%
Progressive Conservative	Leah Martin	1,986	42.28	+10.30
New Democratic	Alec Stratford	1,748	37.22	+10.36
Liberal	Tania Meloni	893	19.01	-20.74
Green	John E. McStay	70	1.49	–
Total		4,697	–	
Total rejected ballots		24		
Turnout		4,721	46.58	
Eligible voters		10,135		
Progressive Conservative gain		Swing		
Source: Elections Nova Scotia

=== 2021 ===
2021 Nova Scotia general election
Party	Candidate	Votes	%	±%	Expenditures
Liberal	Tony Ince	2,118	39.75	+5.01	$25,071.93
Progressive Conservative	Darryl Johnson	1,704	31.98	-0.64	$25,039.43
New Democratic	Jerome Lagmay	1,431	26.86	-1.46	$20,436.91
Atlantica	Chris Kinnie	75	1.41	–	$200.00
Total valid votes/expense limit		5,328	99.46		$62,536.79
Total rejected ballots		29	0.54		
Turnout		5,357	52.90		
Eligible voters		10,126			
Liberal hold		Swing		+2.83	
Source: Elections Nova Scotia

=== 2017 ===
2017 provincial election redistributed results
Party	Vote	%
Liberal	1,984	34.75
Progressive Conservative	1,863	32.63
New Democratic	1,617	28.32
Green	243	4.26
Independent	3	0.05

2017 Nova Scotia general election: Cole Harbour-Portland Valley
Party	Candidate	Votes	%	±%
Liberal	Tony Ince	3,583	36.85	-4.18
Progressive Conservative	Chris Mont	3,203	32.94	+14.80
New Democratic	Andre Cain	2,552	26.25	-14.57
Green	Melanie Mulrooney	385	3.96	
Total valid votes		9,723	100.0	
Total rejected ballots		41	0.42	
Turnout		9,764	54.30	
Eligible voters		17,982		
Liberal hold		Swing		-18.98
Source: Elections Nova Scotia

=== 2013 ===
2013 Nova Scotia general election: Cole Harbour-Portland Valley
Party	Candidate	Votes	%	±%
Liberal	Tony Ince	4,002	41.04	+23.28
New Democratic	Darrell Dexter	3,981	40.82	-28.00
Progressive Conservative	Gregory E. Frampton	1,769	18.14	+7.09
Total		9,752	–	
Source(s) Source: Nova Scotia Legislature (2024). "Electoral History for Cole Harbour-Portland Valley" (PDF). nslegislature.ca. Nova Scotia, Chief Electoral Officer (2013). 39th Provincial General Election, October 8, 2013: Volume 1 – Statement of Votes & Statistics (PDF) (Report). Elections Nova Scotia. Archived from the original (PDF) on 10 April 2018.

=== 2009 ===
2009 Nova Scotia general election
Party	Candidate	Votes	%	±%
New Democratic	Darrell Dexter	5,849	68.82%	9.32%
Liberal	Tony Ince	1,509	17.76%	-3.17%
Progressive Conservative	Mike Josey	939	11.05%	-6.21%
Green	Dawna Toews	202	2.38%	0.06%
Total		8,499	–	
Source(s) Source: Nova Scotia Legislature (2024). "Electoral History for Cole Harbour" (PDF). nslegislature.ca.

=== 2006 ===
2006 Nova Scotia general election
Party	Candidate	Votes	%	±%
New Democratic	Darrell Dexter	5,264	59.50%	4.13%
Liberal	Stephen J. E. Beehan	1,851	20.92%	3.98%
Progressive Conservative	Sheila McKand	1,527	17.26%	-9.29%
Green	Michael McFadden	205	2.32%	–
Total		8,847	–	
Source(s) Source: Nova Scotia Legislature (2024). "Electoral History for Cole Harbour" (PDF). nslegislature.ca.

=== 2003 ===
2003 Nova Scotia general election
Party	Candidate	Votes	%	±%
New Democratic	Darrell Dexter	4,977	55.37%	–
Progressive Conservative	Brian Thomas	2,387	26.55%	–
Liberal	Peter Foy	1,523	16.94%	–
Nova Scotia Party	Jessica Gould	102	1.13%	–
Total		8,989	–	
Source(s) Source: Nova Scotia Legislature (2024). "Electoral History for Cole Harbour" (PDF). nslegislature.ca.

=== 1988 ===
1988 Nova Scotia general election
Party	Candidate	Votes	%	±%
Progressive Conservative	David Nantes	6,280	47.58%	-13.91%
Liberal	Alan Mitchell	4,892	37.06%	18.28%
New Democratic	Flora Christie	2,027	15.36%	-4.37%
Total		13,199	–	
Source(s) Source: Nova Scotia Legislature (2024). "Electoral History for Cole Harbour" (PDF). nslegislature.ca. Nova Scotia, Chief Electoral Officer (1988). Returns of the General Election for the House of Assembly, Thirty-Second General Election (PDF) (Report). Queen's Printer. Archived from the original (PDF) on 7 July 2018.

=== 1984 ===
1984 Nova Scotia general election
Party	Candidate	Votes	%	±%
Progressive Conservative	David Nantes	5,283	61.49%	10.29%
New Democratic	Les MacDougall	1,695	19.73%	-4.29%
Liberal	Dennis F. Cuvelier	1,614	18.78%	-6.00%
Total		8,592	–	
Source(s) Source: Nova Scotia Legislature (2024). "Electoral History for Cole Harbour" (PDF). nslegislature.ca. Nova Scotia, Chief Electoral Officer (1984). Returns of the General Election for the House of Assembly, Thirty-First General Election (PDF) (Report). Queen's Printer. Archived from the original (PDF) on 31 July 2017.

=== 1981 ===
1981 Nova Scotia general election
Party	Candidate	Votes	%	±%
Progressive Conservative	David Nantes	4,605	51.20%	-3.53%
Liberal	Rae Austin	2,229	24.78%	-10.81%
New Democratic	Steve MacDonald	2,160	24.02%	14.33%
Total		8,994	–	
Source(s) Source: Nova Scotia Legislature (2024). "Electoral History for Cole Harbour" (PDF). nslegislature.ca. Nova Scotia, Chief Electoral Officer (1981). Returns of the General Election for the House of Assembly, Thirtieth General Election (PDF) (Report). Queen's Printer. Archived from the original (PDF) on 31 July 2017.

=== 1978 ===
1978 Nova Scotia general election
Party	Candidate	Votes	%	±%
Progressive Conservative	David Nantes	4,278	54.73%	–
Liberal	Peter Sawler	2,782	35.59%	–
New Democratic	Daniel La Fitte	757	9.68%	–
Total		7,817	–	
Source(s) Source: Nova Scotia Legislature (2024). "Electoral History for Cole Harbour" (PDF). nslegislature.ca. Nova Scotia, Chief Electoral Officer (1978). Returns of the General Election for the House of Assembly, Twenty-Ninth General Election (PDF) (Report). Queen's Printer. Archived from the original (PDF) on 18 June 2018.

== See also ==
- List of Nova Scotia provincial electoral districts
- Canadian provincial electoral districts
- Cole Harbour-Eastern Passage, a provincial electoral district in Nova Scotia
- Dartmouth—Cole Harbour, a federal electoral district in Nova Scotia
- Dartmouth-Cole Harbour (provincial electoral district) in Nova Scotia
