= David Nantes (politician) =

Canadian politician

The Honourable David Nantes ECNS

MLA for Cole Harbour
- In office 1978–1993
- Preceded by: new riding
- Succeeded by: riding dissolved

Minister of Health
- In office December 23, 1988 – September 25, 1990
- Preceded by: Joel Matheson
- Succeeded by: George Moody

Personal details
- Born: June 6, 1945 (age 80) Charlottetown, Prince Edward Island
- Party: Progressive Conservative

Gerald David Nantes (born June 6, 1945) is an engineer and former political figure in Nova Scotia, Canada. He represented Cole Harbour in the Nova Scotia House of Assembly from 1978 to 1993 as a Progressive Conservative member.

== Early life and career ==
Nantes was born in 1945 at Charlottetown, Prince Edward Island, the son of Gerald T. Nantes and Mary Catherine Hogan. He was educated at St. Dunstan's University, the Technical University of Nova Scotia and Dalhousie University. Nantes married Diane LaRose in March 1967. Nantes was the president and chief executive officer of the Nova Scotia Tidal Power Corporation from January 1980 to March 1984.

== Political career ==
Nantes entered provincial politics in the 1978 election, winning the Cole Harbour riding. He was re-elected in 1981. On November 4, 1983, Nantes was appointed to the Executive Council of Nova Scotia as Minister of Labour. Nantes was re-elected in the 1984 election, and continued to serve in the Labour portfolio until moving to Minister of Municipal Affairs in a November 1985 cabinet shuffle. In November 1987, Nantes was shuffled to Minister of Small Business Development.

In the 1988 election, Nantes was re-elected for a fourth term, defeating Liberal Alan Mitchell by 1400 votes. In a post election cabinet shuffle, he was named Minister of Health. On September 25, 1990, Nantes resigned from cabinet after Halifax police charged him with releasing confidential mental health information about a former deputy minister who had made allegations of widespread patronage in the Tory government. An initial investigation of Nantes's remarks found that no charges could be laid as he was protected by parliamentary privilege, but the case was reopened when the local CBC station broadcast similar comments made by Nantes to reporters outside the legislature. Nantes went on trial in January 1991, and was acquitted of the charges in March 1991.

On January 22, 1993, Nantes announced that he was not running for re-election in the 1993 election.
