= Darrell Dexter =

Premier of Nova Scotia from 2009 to 2013

The Honourable Darrell Dexter ECNS ONS
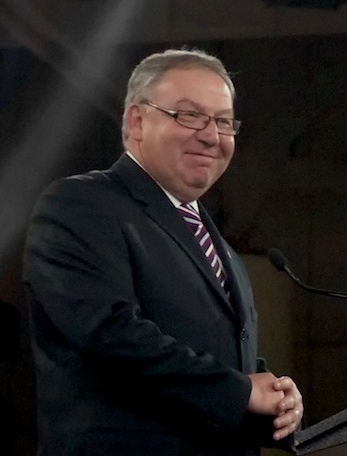
- Dexter in 2012

27th Premier of Nova Scotia
- In office June 19, 2009 – October 22, 2013
- Monarch: Elizabeth II
- Lieutenant Governor: Mayann Francis; John J. Grant
- Preceded by: Rodney MacDonald
- Succeeded by: Stephen McNeil

Leader of the Nova Scotia New Democratic Party
- In office June 2001 – November 23, 2013
- Preceded by: Helen MacDonald
- Succeeded by: Maureen MacDonald (interim)

Leader of the Opposition of Nova Scotia
- In office June 2001 – June 19, 2009
- Preceded by: Robert Chisholm
- Succeeded by: Stephen McNeil

Member of the Nova Scotia House of Assembly for Cole Harbour Dartmouth-Cole Harbour (1998–2003)
- In office August 5, 1998 – October 8, 2013
- Preceded by: Alan Mitchell
- Succeeded by: Tony Ince

Personal details
- Born: Darrell Elvin Dexter; September 10, 1957 (age 69) Halifax, Nova Scotia, Canada
- Party: New Democratic Party
- Spouse: Kelly Wilson
- Education: Dalhousie University; University of King's College
- Profession: Lawyer; naval officer; journalist

Military service
- Branch/service: Canadian Forces
- Rank: Sub-lieutenant

Darrell Elvin Dexter ONS (born 1957) is a Canadian lawyer, journalist and former naval officer who served as the 27th premier of Nova Scotia from 2009 to 2013. A member of the Nova Scotia New Democratic Party, he served as party leader from 2001 to 2013. He became Premier in 2009 after his party defeated the governing Progressive Conservative Party, leading the first NDP government in Atlantic Canada and the second east of Manitoba. His government was defeated in the 2013 election, becoming the first Nova Scotia government in 131 years to be denied a second mandate; Dexter himself was defeated in his constituency by 21 votes. Dexter now serves as a lobbyist for the cannabis industry.

== Early life ==
Darrell Dexter was born on September 10, 1957, in Halifax, Nova Scotia, to Elvin, a steel metal worker, and Florence Dexter (née Pace), and grew up in the rural community of Milton in Queens County. He was the first member of his family to go to university.

Dexter volunteered for Alexa McDonough in her 1979 federal election campaign. Dexter holds degrees in education and law from Dalhousie University, and a degree in journalism from the University of King's College. He used his journalism degree for a period as a reporter for The Daily News in the early 1980s. Dexter also served in the Canadian Forces holding the rank of Sub-Lieutenant and was a Combat Information Officer on board HMCS Yukon and HMCS Qu'Appelle while deployed with Maritime Forces Pacific.

Dexter was a practicing lawyer before he entered public life. He was first elected as a Dartmouth City Councilor, serving from 1994 to 1996.

A former chair and member of the board of the Dartmouth Downtown Development Corporation, Dexter was also once a member of the Dartmouth General Hospital Commission, Chair of the Dartmouth Common Committee, a former member of the board of directors of the Victorian Order of Nurses (Dartmouth Branch), and a member of the Community Planning Association.

In September 2015, Dexter joined Global Public Affairs as vice-chair.

Dexter is married to Kelly Wilson and together they have one son.

== Member of the Legislative Assembly ==
Dexter was elected to the Nova Scotia Legislature as MLA for Dartmouth-Cole Harbour in 1998 and served as critic for Economic Development and Health. He was re-elected in 1999, 2003, 2006 and 2009.

== Provincial leadership ==
Dexter became the 8th leader of the Nova Scotia NDP in June 2001 when he took over as interim leader after Helen MacDonald stepped down. He ran for the leadership against John MacDonell in 2002 and won with 63% of the vote.

== 2003 election campaign ==
In Dexter's first provincial campaign in 2003, the NDP campaign trailed in third place in many polls and was in danger of losing seats. The NDP looked to consolidate its strong support in the Metro Halifax area, and make gains in the conservative rural mainland and Cape Breton.

Dexter campaigned to form Crown Corporation for car insurance to lower premiums by 50%, paying for health coverage in nursing homes, reducing waiting lists for surgeries and diagnostic tests, removing the provincial portion of the HST on home heating oil, increase classroom resources for public schools, freezing tuition fees for Nova Scotia universities for a year while introducing a student debt relief plan, and maintaining balanced budgets.

On election night, Dexter and the NDP did make small gains in the popular vote and won four more seats, including two in Dartmouth, one in Cape Breton and one in Pictou County, and the PC government of John Hamm was reduced to a minority.

== 2006 election campaign ==
The MacDonald Government called an election for June 13, 2006, and Dexter was once again the NDP's candidate for Premier. At the outset, most pollsters had the NDP at the same level of support it had in 2003, roughly 30% and behind the Tories in second place. Dexter campaigned on a platform to improve services for seniors, lowering the cost of heating oil for homes, a 10% cut in post-secondary education tuition, subsidized child care and public auto insurance.

Dexter performance in the leaders' debate was improved in the eyes of many pundits. The NDP was returned once again as the official opposition, but did make major gains on election night. The party gained five seats for a total of 20, the best performance in its history. Dexter also was comfortably re-elected in his own seat of Cole Harbour with 59.5% of the vote. The NDP increased its share of the popular vote to 34.5%, a rise of 4 percentage points. The NDP also won seats in the South Shore region, where it had not performed well in previous elections, specifically in Shelburne and Queens.

== Opposition Leader ==
Dexter was Opposition Leader to both premier John Hamm and Rodney MacDonald of the PCs. He credited his ability to work with Hamm to get things done as the reason for the NDP increase in seats in the 2006 election.

Within a few months of the 2006 election, the NDP took a lead in opinion polls, which it held consistently until the 2009 election.

== 2009 election campaign ==
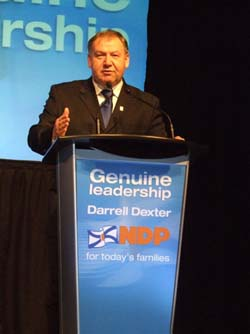
Dexter at an NDP meeting in Halifax, 2009

The NDP and Liberals voted against a money bill on May 4, 2009, defeating the MacDonald government and hence forcing an election one year before it was due. By this time, the NDP had been leading in opinion polls for most of the last three years and was on target to win a minority government. The NDP looked to hold its support in the Metro Halifax area, and make gains on the South Shore and rural mainland Nova Scotia.

Dexter campaigned on a document called Better Deal 2009 which came with 50 promises to be completed over 4 years, and focused on 7 key commitments of creating new jobs, helping to keep emergency rooms open, taking the HST off of home electricity, fixing rural roads, helping seniors, giving young people a reason to stay in the province, and more renewable energy.

On June 9, 2009, Dexter was elected the first NDP premier of Nova Scotia with a majority government. They held their support in Halifax and Cape Breton, and expanded their base on the South Shore, Pictou and suburban Halifax. The NDP won in the Annapolis Valley and Central Nova Scotia for the first time, winning the seats of Kings North, Kings South, Truro-Bible Hill, Colchester-Musquodoboit Valley and Cumberland North.

== Premier of Nova Scotia ==
=== First year ===
Dexter's party won the general election held on June 9, 2009, and became the first NDP government in Nova Scotia, and the first in Atlantic Canada. He was sworn in as Premier of Nova Scotia on June 19, 2009.

The Dexter government struggled for the first year of its mandate to control spending on public programs while increasing revenue. It paid off when Dexter's minister of finance Graham Steele posted the provincial budget on April 4, 2011, showing a $447 million surplus – one of the largest in Nova Scotia's history and only the 7th time the debt was paid down since 1950. Major factors in recording this surplus were a one-time adjustment from the federal government of almost $200 million as well as an increase to the HST by two percentage points. However, Dexter's government also made several unpopular decisions, including removing the freeze on tuition fee hikes for Nova Scotia universities as well as budget cuts and freezes in public education and health care spending.

The first year in office, Dexter and his NDP government sat in the legislature for more days than the previous government's last four sessions combined; the Conservatives sat 15 days in the Fall of 2007, 21 days in the Spring of 2008, 16 days in the Fall of 2008 and 3 days in the Spring of 2009 when an election was called. Dexter's NDP government sat for 35 days in the Fall of 2009 and 32 days in the Spring of 2010.

Legislative highlights in the first year included the province beginning to help cover the travel cost for out-of-province medical care, increasing funding to women's shelters for the first time in a decade, creating a Graduate Retention Rebate for graduates who stay in Nova Scotia, banning uranium mining and the use of cosmetic pesticides, banning political donations by unions and businesses, and launching a new renewable energy strategy with a target of 40% renewable energy by 2020.

In December 2009, at an international summit in Copenhagen, Dexter was awarded a Climate Leadership in Canada award for putting a Greenhouse Gas Emissions Cap on electricity in Nova Scotia.

In Dexter's first year as Premier two significant stories caused controversy for the NDP government and Nova Scotia's MLAs. On February 3, 2010, Nova Scotia auditor general Jacques Lapointe released a report stating that many Nova Scotia politicians had filed expense claims that were "excessive or inappropriate" because of inadequate spending controls that invite errors and misuse. Lapointe's report found that politicians had used taxpayers' money to buy items including televisions, cameras and other electronic equipment, custom-made furniture, model boats, and espresso makers. Lapointe's report questioned the appropriateness of the spending habits of all three main political parties. Dexter himself expensed $7,650 for a pair of laptops and a digital camera, while taxpayers picked up his annual $3,500 professional fee to the Nova Scotia Barrister's Society. Dexter later rejected a call for a public inquiry into the MLA spending scandal, saying that due to the Auditor General's report, excessive and inappropriate spending by MLAs would be curtailed. Dexter promised reforms to the expense system, and the first bill he introduced in the spring of 2010 was An Act to Establish a Management Commission for the Effective Administration of the House of Assembly, saying "I promised Nova Scotians that their demands for an open and transparent system for MLA expenses would be met."

Three former and one incumbent Member of the Legislative Assembly, Liberals Dave Wilson, Russell MacKinnon, Progressive Conservative Richard Hurlburt, and former NDP turned Independent MLA Trevor Zinck were criminally charged for their involvement.

The second controversy occurred on February 25, 2010, when Elections Nova Scotia fined the governing NDP $10,000, the maximum fine under the governing act, for accepting an illegal campaign donation from a trade union, referring the case to police. The agency said the NDP took more than $5,000 from a single donor and failed to return $45,000 from eight unions and one union affiliate, though it "knew or should have known" the money was all from the Mainland Building and Construction Trades Council. After the release of the report, Dexter stated that he had believed the money had been returned. Party secretary Ed Wark resigned, citing a "serious error in judgment".

=== Second year ===
The Dexter government used the second year of its mandate to continue to get spending under control while increasing revenue. Dexter also lobbied the federal government on helping with "nation-building" projects including the Lower Churchill Falls renewable energy project from Newfoundland to Nova Scotia and awarding a national ship building contract to the Halifax shipyard.

Dexter's NDP government continued to sit in the legislature for double the days of the previous government. Significant legislation in the second year included creating the province's first debt-cap for university students, a tax reduction for small business, an Auditor General Act giving that office more power and access to information, an indefinite moratorium on oil and gas exploration on Georges Bank, and Canada's first "Lemon Law" which requires used car dealers to give buyers more information.

Two decisions saw significant opposition during Dexter's second year as Premier. The first was his government's replacing an early learning program called Reading Recovery with Succeeding in Reading. Critics were concerned changing programs would hurt children's literacy, while advocates argued that the old program was too expensive and the new program would help more children in more grades.

Business advocates were concerned that a bill that was barely debated by the opposition in the legislature in the bill's first stages would give power to labour unions, and they held up passage of the bill by several weeks. The bill combined the activities of six boards into one unified Labour Board and created a Labour Management Review Committee that consisted of managers and employees from unionized workplaces. Critics wanted non-unionized business people to have a say in how workplaces become unionized and worried about a preamble that supported including collective bargaining as part of the Freedom to Assemble, while advocates argued that the committee was required by law to consult with businesses and that the preamble had been in the Canada Labour Code since 1972. The government amended the bill to guarantee non-unionized businesses are consulted on potential labour changes affecting matters including union drives.

The 2011 budget was tabled on April 5. Although the final figures for 2010 showed a surprising surplus, Dexter's Finance Minister Graham Steele estimated a deficit for 2011 of $389 million, and promised to continue with their 4-year plan to get Nova Scotia out of unsustainable spending through both economic growth and trimming department budgets. The NDP pledged to reduce debt servicing costs, expand their ban March Madness spending in departments, keep unbudgeted spending low and continue to review department programs. The budget also pledged to open Canada's first Collaborative Emergency Centres as a way of keeping emergency health services in rural Nova Scotia, reduce the price of prescription drugs for people on Medicare, provide tax relief by increasing the Basic Personal Amount, and give more money to people living on income assistance. Critics suggested the projected deficit was higher than it should be as a way of the government providing good news when the deficit turns out to be lower and called for more cuts and faster cuts, while Dexter's government said unpredictable conditions in the worldwide economy required caution and stated the opposition would need to explain where extra cuts would come from.

=== Third year ===
The third year of Dexter's mandate brought significant news for the province. The Halifax Shipyard was awarded the federal shipbuilding contract, and the NDP announced an agreement with Newfoundland on the Lower Churchill project to bring hydroelectricity to Nova Scotia. Dexter's government also opened Canada's first Collaborative Emergency Centres to start to address emergency room closures in rural Nova Scotia.

Significant legislation in the third year included re-creating Nova Scotia's independent Arts Council, capping cellphone contract cancellation fees, scheduling a reduction in the HST by one point in 2014 and another point in 2015, and reducing the small business tax for the third year in a row.

Two decisions drew substantial opposition during Dexter's third year as Premier. Both the Conservatives and Liberals tried to block a labour-friendly bill on First Contract Arbitration. The bill meant that if employees voted democratically to form a union but could not reach an agreement with their employer on a first-contract, then an arbitrator would create one to avoid a strike. Critics said the legislation showed the NDP was on the side of workers instead of business, while advocates pointed out that similar legislation exists across Canada regardless of which party is in power, reduced the number of work stoppages, and did not lead to job losses in other provinces.

The second controversy involved his government's work to try to save the forestry and pulp and paper industries in the province. While both opposition parties eventually voted for the legislation to help the paper mill in Queens County, some criticized the move to protect jobs as too costly while others applauded the moves to save the economies of the towns of Liverpool and Port Hawkesbury. In the end, the government support was not enough and the Bowater plant in Liverpool closed.

The 2012 budget was tabled on April 12. Dexter made a surprise announcement the day before Finance Minister Graham Steele's budget, announcing that the HST would be reduced by 1 point in 2014 and a second point in 2015.

The budget continued with the NDP's four-year plan to stop Nova Scotia's unsustainable spending through both economic stimulus and holding the line on department budgets. The budget also pledged to open more Collaborative Emergency Centres, help the poor and disabled, provide more needs-based grants to university students, and invest heavily in rural road and highway repair. The budget projected a deficit of $211.2 million, slightly better than the $215.8 million deficit anticipated in the province's fiscal plan, and projected a surplus in the next year.

As Dexter's third year as Premier came to an end, two long-time colleagues announced they would not re-offer when the next election is called. Transportation and Infrastructure Minister Bill Estabrooks and Finance Minister Graham Steele stepped down from Cabinet and were replaced by Antigonish MLA Maurice Smith and Nova Scotia's first ever female Finance Minister Maureen MacDonald.

=== Fourth year ===
The fourth year of Dexter's government included the introduction of a balanced budget, and significant debate over the Maritime Link project with the province of Newfoundland.

Significant legislation in the fourth year included stronger protection for animals, cyber-safety laws, the Betty Bauman law, and reducing the small business tax for the fourth year in a row.

One topic saw substantial debate throughout the year was the question of whether to move forward with the Maritime Link project, which would bring in hydroelectricity from Newfoundland at a fixed rate over 35 years. Opponents suggested Nova Scotia should move slower on renewable energy, or import energy from Hydro-Québec instead. Proponents of the deal said it was a made-in-Atlantic-Canada solution, would put Nova Scotia into an "energy loop" and allow the province to meet both its green-house gas emissions requirements and renewable energy targets.

The 2012 budget was tabled on April 4, and presented a small surplus of $16.4 million, ending the NDP's four-year plan to get "back to balance". The budget also invested in more Collaborative Emergency Centres, insulin pump funding for children, expanded dental care coverage for children, expanded newborn screening, and tax breaks for low income seniors.

The Dexter government was heavily defeated in the 2013 provincial election which saw the NDP collapse to only 7 seats, reducing it to third party status in the legislature behind Stephen McNeil's Liberals and the PCs. This was mainly due to a near-wipeout in Halifax, the party's power base for almost two decades; the NDP went from holding 14 of the capital's 20 seats to just two. Dexter ran in Cole Harbour-Portland Valley, essentially a reconfigured version of his old seat, and lost to Liberal candidate Tony Ince by only 21 votes. He was the first sitting premier of Nova Scotia to be unseated in his own riding since Ernest Howard Armstrong in 1925. Eight other members of his cabinet were defeated. Dexter served as premier until his successor Stephen McNeil was sworn in as the 28th Premier of Nova Scotia on October 22, 2013, and later announced on November 16, 2013, that he would resign as NDP leader, effective November 23, 2013.

== After politics ==
As of 2017, Dexter was vice-chair at Global Public Affairs, the country's largest privately held government relations firm. Among other issues, the firm lobbied on behalf of the cannabis industry in Canada while it was being legalized. Dexter was also appointed Honorary Distinguished Fellow at Dalhousie University's MacEachen Institute for Public Policy and Governance, where he teaches on public policy. In 2014, he led two international election observer missions to Tunisia.
