= 2013–14 Air Force Falcons men's ice hockey season =

Ledyard Bank Classic, Champion
- Conference: T–3rd Atlantic Hockey
- Home ice: Cadet Ice Arena

Rankings
- USCHO.com: NR
- USA Today: NR

Record
- Overall: 21–14–4
- Conference: 15–9–3
- Home: 12–5–2
- Road: 7–8–2
- Neutral: 2–1–0

Coaches and captains
- Head coach: Frank Serratore
- Assistant coaches: Andy Berg; Joe Doyle
- Captain(s): Adam McKenzie; Ryan TImar
- Alternate captain: Dan Weissenhofer

The 2013–14 Air Force Falcons men's ice hockey season was the 46th season of play for the program and the 8th season in the Atlantic Hockey conference. The Falcons represented the United States Air Force Academy and were coached by Frank Serratore, in his 17th season.

== Departures ==
Player	Position	Nationality	Cause
Eric Artman	Defenseman	United States	Graduation (retired)
David Bosner	Goaltender	United States	Left program (retired)
Stephen Carew	Forward	United States	Graduation (retired)
Kyle De Laurell	Forward	United States	Graduation (signed with Bakersfield Condors)
Max Edson	Forward	United States	Left program (retired)
Casey Kleisinger	Forward	United States	Left program (retired)
John Kruse	Forward	United States	Graduation (retired)
Mike Walsh	Defenseman	United States	Graduation (retired)

== Recruiting ==
Player	Position	Nationality	Age	Notes
Max Birkinbine	Forward	United States	20	White Bear Lake, MN
Ryan Dau	Forward	United States	20	Hudson, WI
Ryan Doucet	Forward	United States	20	San Jose, CA
Chris Dylewski	Goaltender	United States	21	Colorado Springs, CO
Johnny Hrabovsky	Defenseman	United States	20	Hummelstown, PA
A. J. Reid	Forward	United States	21	Lakeville, MN
Chris Truehl	Goaltender	United States	19	Stoughton, WI

== Roster ==
No.	Nat.	Player	Class	Pos	Height	Weight	DoB	Hometown	Previous team	NHL rights
2	(United States)	Jacob Musselman	Senior	D	5' 8" (1.73 m)	181 lb (82 kg)	1989-02-10	Littleton, Colorado	Kenai River Brown Bears (NAHL)	—
3	(United States)	Johnny Hrabovsky	Freshman	D	6' 0" (1.83 m)	187 lb (85 kg)	1993-03-19	Hummelstown, Pennsylvania	Tri-City Storm (USHL)	—
6	(United States)	Adam McKenzie (C)	Senior	D	5' 11" (1.8 m)	180 lb (82 kg)	1990-05-25	Petaluma, California	Wenatchee Wild (NAHL)	—
8	(United States)	Max Hartner	Sophomore	D	6' 0" (1.83 m)	205 lb (93 kg)	1991-09-30	Greenwood Village, Colorado	Green Bay Gamblers (USHL)	—
10	(United States)	Jesse Ramsey	Sophomore	F	5' 11" (1.8 m)	174 lb (79 kg)	1991-06-03	Rogers, Minnesota	Kenai River Brown Bears (NAHL)	—
11	(United States)	Dan Weissenhofer (A)	Junior	D	6' 2" (1.88 m)	205 lb (93 kg)	1991-08-20	Naperville, Illinois	Fargo Force (USHL)	—
12	(United States)	Benjamin Persian	Junior	F	6' 2" (1.88 m)	185 lb (84 kg)	1991-01-04	Orono, Minnesota	Owatonna Express (NAHL)	—
13	(United States)	Ryan Timar (C)	Senior	F	5' 10" (1.78 m)	181 lb (82 kg)	1989-11-17	Novi, Michigan	Wenatchee Wild (NAHL)	—
16	(United States)	Jason Fabian	Senior	F	6' 4" (1.93 m)	194 lb (88 kg)	1989-07-24	Roseau, Minnesota	Bismarck Bobcats (NAHL)	—
17	(United States)	Chad Demers	Junior	F	5' 11" (1.8 m)	181 lb (82 kg)	1990-11-15	Grafton, North Dakota	Fargo Force (USHL)	—
18	(United States)	George Michalke III	Junior (RS)	F	5' 11" (1.8 m)	165 lb (75 kg)	1990-01-23	Parma, Ohio	Fairbanks Ice Dogs (NAHL)	—
19	(United States)	Scott Holm	Junior	F	6' 2" (1.88 m)	190 lb (86 kg)	1991-10-15	Plymouth, Minnesota	Surrey Eagles (BCHL)	—
20	(United States)	Tony Thomas	Senior	F	6' 3" (1.91 m)	201 lb (91 kg)	1990-11-16	South Lyon, Michigan	Topeka Roadrunners (NAHL)	—
21	(United States)	Ryan Doucet	Freshman	F	6' 3" (1.91 m)	209 lb (95 kg)	1992-10-11	San Jose, California	Jamestown Ironmen (NAHL)	—
22	(United States)	Cole Gunner	Junior	F	5' 9" (1.75 m)	181 lb (82 kg)	1990-10-11	Richfield, Minnesota	Tri-City Storm (USHL)	—
24	(United States)	A. J. Reid	Freshman	F	5' 10" (1.78 m)	190 lb (86 kg)	1992-09-09	Lakeville, Minnesota	Austin Bruins (NAHL)	—
25	(United States)	Mitch Torrel	Senior	F	6' 1" (1.85 m)	187 lb (85 kg)	1993-06-02	Monticello, Minnesota	Wenatchee Wild (NAHL)	—
26	(United States)	Ben Carey	Sophomore	F	5' 11" (1.8 m)	170 lb (77 kg)	1992-12-30	Centennial, Colorado	Wenatchee Wild (NAHL)	—
27	(United States)	Max Birkinbine	Freshman	F	5' 10" (1.78 m)	172 lb (78 kg)	1993-01-05	White Bear Lake, Minnesota	Des Moines Buccaneers (USHL)	—
28	(United States)	Ryan Dau	Freshman	F	6' 1" (1.85 m)	174 lb (79 kg)	1993-03-02	Hudson, Wisconsin	Janesville Jets (NAHL)	—
29	(United States)	Jason Torf	Senior	G	6' 1" (1.85 m)	174 lb (79 kg)	1991-04-26	Hermosa Beach, California	Motor City Metal Jackets (NAHL)	—
30	(United States)	Chris Truehl	Freshman	G	6' 3" (1.91 m)	205 lb (93 kg)	1993-10-27	Stoughton, Wisconsin	Johnstown Tomahawks (NAHL)	—
33	(United States)	Chris Dylewski	Freshman	G	5' 11" (1.8 m)	165 lb (75 kg)		Colorado Springs, Colorado	Tampa Bay Jr. Bolts (Independent)	—
39	(United States)	Paul Moberg	Junior	G	6' 1" (1.85 m)	174 lb (79 kg)	1991-03-24	Forest Lake, Minnesota	Coulee Region Chill (NAHL)	—
40	(United States)	Alex Halloran	Junior	D	5' 9" (1.75 m)	181 lb (82 kg)	1990-09-10	Salt Lake City, Utah	Cowichan Valley Capitals (BCHL)	—
55	(United States)	Michael McDonald	Junior	D	6' 5" (1.96 m)	216 lb (98 kg)	191-02-16	Mahtomedi, Minnesota	Coulee Region Chill (NAHL)	—
77	(United States)	Trevor Waldoch	Sophomore	D	6' 2" (1.88 m)	190 lb (86 kg)	1992-01-29	Forest Lake, Minnesota	Austin Bruins (NAHL)	—

== Standings ==
2013–14 Atlantic Hockey standings
	Conference record							Overall record					
	GP	W	L	T	PTS	GF	GA	GP	W	L	T	GF	GA
Mercyhurst^{†}	27	17	4	6	40	107	65	41	21	13	7	148	124
Bentley	27	16	7	4	36	100	67	37	19	14	4	127	99
Air Force	27	15	9	3	33	81	73	39	21	14	4	115	106
Connecticut	27	15	9	3	33	75	61	36	18	14	4	91	86
Robert Morris*	27	13	9	5	31	95	78	42	19	18	5	145	130
Niagara	27	11	11	5	27	89	78	40	15	20	5	113	122
Canisius	27	11	13	3	25	81	78	41	17	21	3	120	125
Holy Cross	27	11	13	3	25	68	72	39	14	22	3	97	114
RIT	27	10	14	3	23	67	84	37	12	20	5	94	124
Sacred Heart	27	11	16	0	22	75	99	36	12	24	0	82	137
American International	27	9	17	1	19	74	107	36	10	25	1	90	151
Army	27	5	22	0	10	60	110	34	6	28	0	73	146
Championship: Robert Morris † indicates conference regular season champion; * indicates conference tournament champion Rankings: USCHO.com Top 20 Poll; updated March 23, 2014

== Schedule and results ==
Date	Time	Opponent^{#}	Rank^{#}	Site	TV	Decision	Result	Attendance	Record
Exhibition
October 7	6:05 PM	New Brunswick*		Cadet Ice Arena • Colorado Springs, Colorado					
Kendall Hockey Classic
October 11	7:07 PM	vs. Alaska*		Sullivan Arena • Anchorage, Alaska (Kendall Hockey Game 1)		Torf	L 1–6	3,024	0–1–0
October 12	9:07 PM	at Alaska Anchorage*		Sullivan Arena • Anchorage, Alaska (Kendall Hockey Game 2)		Torf	L 2–4	3,592	0–2–0
Regular Season
October 18	7:05 PM	Penn State*		Cadet Ice Arena • Colorado Springs, Colorado		Torf	W 5–2	2,519	1–2–0
October 19	7:05 PM	Penn State*		Cadet Ice Arena • Colorado Springs, Colorado		Torf	W 3–1	2,189	2–2–0
October 25	7:05 PM	Canisius		Cadet Ice Arena • Colorado Springs, Colorado		Torf	W 3–2	1,859	3–2–0 (1–0–0)
October 26	4:05 PM	Canisius		Cadet Ice Arena • Colorado Springs, Colorado		Torf	W 7–4	1,607	4–2–0 (2–0–0)
November 1	5:05 PM	at RIT		Gene Polisseni Center • Henrietta, New York		Torf	W 2–0	1,788	5–2–0 (3–0–0)
November 2	5:05 PM	at Mercyhurst		Mercyhurst Ice Center • Erie, Pennsylvania		Torf	L 2–8	1,788	5–3–0 (3–1–0)
November 16	7:05 PM	Robert Morris		Cadet Ice Arena • Colorado Springs, Colorado		Torf	W 4–3	2,167	6–3–0 (4–1–0)
November 19	7:07 PM	at Colorado College*		Broadmoor World Arena • Colorado Springs, Colorado (Rivalry)		Torf	W 3–1	6,041	7–3–0
November 22	7:05 PM	Denver*		Cadet Ice Arena • Colorado Springs, Colorado		Torf	T 3–3 ^{OT}	2,033	7–3–1
November 23	7:07 PM	at Denver*		Magness Arena • Denver, Colorado		Torf	L 1–3	5,232	7–4–1
November 29	7:05 PM	Bentley		Cadet Ice Arena • Colorado Springs, Colorado		Torf	L 2–4	1,967	7–5–1 (4–2–0)
November 30	7:05 PM	Bentley		Cadet Ice Arena • Colorado Springs, Colorado		Torf	T 2–2 ^{OT}	1,729	7–5–2 (4–2–1)
December 6	5:05 PM	at Holy Cross		Hart Center • Worcester, Massachusetts		Torf	T 2–2 ^{OT}	905	7–5–3 (4–2–2)
December 7	5:05 PM	at Holy Cross		Hart Center • Worcester, Massachusetts		Torf	T 3–3 ^{OT}	817	7–5–4 (4–2–3)
Ledyard Bank Classic
December 29	2:05 PM	vs. #16 Northeastern*		Thompson Arena • Hanover, New Hampshire (Ledyard Bank Semifinal)		Torf	W 5–2	2,905	8–5–4
December 29	5:23 PM	vs. #4 Providence*		Thompson Arena • Hanover, New Hampshire (Ledyard Bank Semifinal)		Torf	W 3–2	2,466	9–5–4
January 3	5:05 PM	at American International		Olympia Ice Center • West Springfield, Massachusetts		Moberg	L 3–4 ^{OT}	78	9–6–4 (4–3–3)
January 4	5:05 PM	at American International		Olympia Ice Center • West Springfield, Massachusetts		Truehl	W 2–0 ^{OT}	150	10–6–4 (5–3–3)
January 10	4:05 PM	at Army		Tate Rink • West Point, New York (Rivalry)		Truehl	W 3–1	2,642	11–6–4 (6–3–3)
January 11	5:05 PM	at Army		Tate Rink • West Point, New York (Rivalry)		Truehl	W 4–2	2,642	12–6–4 (7–3–3)
January 17	7:05 PM	Sacred Heart		Cadet Ice Arena • Colorado Springs, Colorado		Truehl	W 6–4	2,112	13–6–4 (8–3–3)
January 18	7:05 PM	Sacred Heart		Cadet Ice Arena • Colorado Springs, Colorado		Truehl	W 4–0	2,218	14–6–4 (9–3–3)
January 24	5:05 PM	at Robert Morris		Colonials Arena • Neville Township, Pennsylvania		Truehl	L 1–3	991	14–7–4 (9–4–3)
January 25	5:05 PM	at Robert Morris		Colonials Arena • Neville Township, Pennsylvania		Truehl	L 3–5	537	14–8–4 (9–5–3)
January 31	7:05 PM	Connecticut		Cadet Ice Arena • Colorado Springs, Colorado		Moberg	L 3–5	1,259	14–9–4 (9–6–3)
February 1	7:05 PM	Connecticut		Cadet Ice Arena • Colorado Springs, Colorado		Truehl	W 3–1	1,924	15–9–4 (10–6–3)
February 7	5:05 PM	Mercyhurst		Cadet Ice Arena • Colorado Springs, Colorado		Truehl	W 5–3	1,749	16–9–4 (11–6–3)
February 8	7:05 PM	Mercyhurst		Cadet Ice Arena • Colorado Springs, Colorado		Truehl	W 2–0	2,214	17–9–4 (12–6–3)
February 14	5:05 PM	at Canisius		LECOM Harborcenter • Buffalo, New York		Truehl	L 0–4	702	17–10–4 (12–7–3)
February 15	5:05 PM	at Canisius		LECOM Harborcenter • Buffalo, New York		Torf	W 4–2	589	18–10–4 (13–7–3)
February 21	7:05 PM	RIT		Cadet Ice Arena • Colorado Springs, Colorado		Torf	W 4–3	2,068	19–10–4 (14–7–3)
February 22	7:05 PM	RIT		Cadet Ice Arena • Colorado Springs, Colorado		Torf	L 2–3	2,311	19–11–4 (14–8–3)
February 28	5:05 PM	at Niagara		Dwyer Arena • Lewiston, New York		Torf	L 2–3	758	19–12–4 (14–9–3)
March 1	5:05 PM	at Niagara		Dwyer Arena • Lewiston, New York		Torf	W 4–1	1,042	20–12–4 (15–9–3)
Atlantic Hockey Tournament
March 14	7:05 PM	Niagara*		Cadet Ice Arena • Colorado Springs, Colorado (Quarterfinals Game 1)		Torf	W 2–1	1,310	21–12–4
March 15	7:05 PM	Niagara*		Cadet Ice Arena • Colorado Springs, Colorado (Quarterfinals Game 2)		Torf	L 3–4	1,481	21–13–4
March 16	7:05 PM	Niagara*		Cadet Ice Arena • Colorado Springs, Colorado (Quarterfinals Game 3)		Torf	L 3–4 ^{OT}	1,397	21–14–4
*Non-conference game. ^{#}Rankings from USCHO.com Poll. All times are in Mountain Time. Source:

== Scoring statistics ==
Name	Position	Games	Goals	Assists	Points	PIM
Cole Gunner	RW	39	15	29	44	16
Chad Demers	F	39	15	26	41	26
Scott Holm	F	38	11	18	29	26
George Michalke	C	32	6	14	20	10
Jason Fabian	F	39	8	11	19	4
Adam McKenzie	D	39	7	11	18	6
Alex Halloran	D	33	4	14	18	27
Dan Weissenhofer	D	36	2	13	15	65
Mitch Torrel	F	28	8	6	14	27
Tony Thomas	F	39	8	6	14	10
Ryan Timar	F	39	7	7	14	20
Ben Carey	F	33	7	3	10	2
A. J. Reid	C/RW	38	5	5	10	22
Johnny Hrabovsky	D	39	2	8	10	2
Max Hartner	D	31	4	5	9	10
Jacob Musselman	D	35	0	7	7	10
Mike McDonald	D	29	1	4	5	30
Ben Persian	F	26	3	1	4	2
Ryan Dau	F	16	1	3	4	8
Max Birkinbine	F	22	0	3	3	16
Ryan Doucet	LW	20	1	1	2	4
Jesse Ramsey	LW	12	0	2	2	2
Paul Moberg	G	4	0	0	0	0
Chris Truehl	G	14	0	0	0	0
Jason Torf	G	26	0	0	0	0
Bench	-	-	-	-	-	2
Total			115	197	312	347

== Goaltending statistics ==
Name	Games	Minutes	Wins	Losses	Ties	Goals Against	Saves	Shut Outs	SV %	GAA
Chris Truehl	14	716:50	8	3	0	24	278	3	.921	2.01
Jason Torf	26	1502:05	13	9	4	65	666	1	.911	2.60
Paul Moberg	4	130:17	0	2	0	10	33	0	.767	4.61
Empty Net	-	16:36	-	-	-	7	-	-	-	-
Total	39	2365:48	21	14	4	106	977	4	.902	2.69

== Rankings ==
Poll	Week																									
Poll	Pre	1	2	3	4	5	6	7	8	9	10	11	12	13	14	15	16	17	18	19	20	21	22	23	24	25 (Final)
USCHO.com	NR	-	NR	NR	NR	NR	NR	NR	NR	NR	NR	NR	NR	NR	NR	NR	NR	NR	NR	NR	NR	NR	NR	NR	NR	NR
USA Today	NR	NR	NR	NR	NR	NR	NR	NR	NR	NR	NR	NR	NR	NR	NR	NR	NR	NR	NR	NR	NR	NR	NR	NR	NR	NR

Note: USCHO did not release a poll in week 1.

== Awards and honors ==
Player	Award	Ref
Jason Fabian	Atlantic Hockey Individual Sportsmanship Award	
Adam McKenzie	All-Atlantic Hockey Second Team	
Cole Gunner	All-Atlantic Hockey Second Team	
Chris Truehl	Atlantic Hockey All-Rookie Team	
