= 2014–15 Air Force Falcons men's ice hockey season =

- Conference: T–6th Atlantic Hockey
- Home ice: Cadet Ice Arena

Rankings
- USCHO.com: NR
- USA Today: NR

Record
- Overall: 16–21–4
- Conference: 13–12–3
- Home: 12–6–1
- Road: 4–13–3
- Neutral: 0–2–0

Coaches and captains
- Head coach: Frank Serratore
- Assistant coaches: Andy Berg; Joe Doyle
- Captain(s): George Michalke III; Dan Weissenhofer
- Alternate captain: Chad Demers

The 2014–15 Air Force Falcons men's ice hockey season was the 47th season of play for the program and the 9th season in the Atlantic Hockey conference. The Falcons represented the United States Air Force Academy and were coached by Frank Serratore, in his 18th season.

== Departures ==
Player	Position	Nationality	Cause
Max Birkinbine	Forward	United States	Left program (retired)
Ryan Dau	Forward	United States	Left program (retired)
Jason Fabian	Forward	United States	Graduation (signed with Pensacola Ice Flyers)
Adam McKenzie	Defenseman	United States	Graduation (signed with Indy Fuel)
Paul Moberg	Goaltender	United States	Left program (retired)
Jacob Musselman	Defenseman	United States	Graduation (signed with Dayton Demolition)
Benjamin Persian	Forward	United States	Left program (retired)
Jesse Ramsey	Forward	United States	Left program (retired)
Tony Thomas	Forward	United States	Graduation (retired)
Ryan Timar	Forward	United States	Graduation (signed with Dayton Demolition)
Jason Torf	Goaltender	United States	Graduation (signed with Indy Fuel)
Mitch Torrel	Forward	United States	Graduation (retired)
Trevor Waldoch	Defenseman	United States	Left program (retired)

== Recruiting ==
Player	Position	Nationality	Age	Notes
Dylan Abood	Defenseman	United States	21	Centennial, CO
Erik Baskin	Forward	United States	20	Minnetonka, MN
Phil Boje	Defenseman	United States	20	Shoreview, MN
Connor Girard	Goaltender	United States	21	Edina, MN
Jordan Himley	Forward	United States	20	Mundelein, IL
Jonathan Kopacka	Defenseman	United States	21	Macomb, MI
Ben Kucera	Forward	United States	19	Overland Park, KS
Tyler Ledford	Forward	United States	20	Folsom, CA
Kyle Mackey	Defenseman	United States	19	Derby, NY
Matt Meier	Forward	United States	19	Highlands Ranch, CO
Tyler Rostenkowski	Defenseman	United States	21	Chicago, Il
Will Vosejpka	Forward	United States	20	Midland, MI

== Roster ==
No.	Nat.	Player	Class	Pos	Height	Weight	DoB	Hometown	Previous team	NHL rights
2	(United States)	Kyle Mackey	Freshman	D	6' 1" (1.85 m)	174 lb (79 kg)	1994-10-07	Derby, New York	Youngstown Phantoms (USHL)	—
3	(United States)	Johnny Hrabovsky	Sophomore	D	6' 0" (1.83 m)	187 lb (85 kg)	1993-03-19	Hummelstown, Pennsylvania	Tri-City Storm (USHL)	—
4	(United States)	Phil Boje	Freshman	D	5' 11" (1.8 m)	192 lb (87 kg)	1994-04-13	Shoreview, Minnesota	Dubuque Fighting Saints (USHL)	—
7	(United States)	Matt Meier	Freshman	D	6' 2" (1.88 m)	201 lb (91 kg)	1995-07-02	Highlands Ranch, Colorado	Johnstown Tomahawks (NAHL)	—
8	(United States)	Max Hartner	Junior	D	6' 0" (1.83 m)	205 lb (93 kg)	1991-09-30	Greenwood Village, Colorado	Green Bay Gamblers (USHL)	—
10	(United States)	Jordan Himley	Freshman	F	5' 8" (1.73 m)	161 lb (73 kg)	1993-12-26	Mundelein, Illinois	Janesville Jets (NAHL)	—
11	(United States)	Dan Weissenhofer (C)	Senior	D	6' 2" (1.88 m)	205 lb (93 kg)	1991-08-20	Naperville, Illinois	Fargo Force (USHL)	—
13	(United States)	Tyler Ledford	Freshman	F	5' 9" (1.75 m)	161 lb (73 kg)	1994-04-29	Folsom, California	Wichita Falls Wildcats (NAHL)	—
14	(United States)	Ben Kucera	Freshman	F	5' 7" (1.7 m)	185 lb (84 kg)	1995-04-23	Overland Park, Kansas	Wichita Falls Wildcats (NAHL)	—
17	(United States)	Chad Demers (A)	Senior	F	5' 11" (1.8 m)	181 lb (82 kg)	1990-11-15	Grafton, North Dakota	Fargo Force (USHL)	—
18	(United States)	George Michalke III (C)	Senior (RS)	F	5' 11" (1.8 m)	165 lb (75 kg)	1990-01-23	Parma, Ohio	Fairbanks Ice Dogs (NAHL)	—
19	(United States)	Scott Holm	Senior	F	6' 2" (1.88 m)	190 lb (86 kg)	1991-10-15	Plymouth, Minnesota	Surrey Eagles (BCHL)	—
20	(United States)	Will Vosejpka	Freshman	F	6' 0" (1.83 m)	183 lb (83 kg)	1994-07-02	Midland, Michigan	Wichita Falls Wildcats (NAHL)	—
21	(United States)	Ryan Doucet	Sophomore	F	6' 3" (1.91 m)	209 lb (95 kg)	1992-10-11	San Jose, California	Jamestown Ironmen (NAHL)	—
22	(United States)	Cole Gunner	Senior	F	5' 9" (1.75 m)	181 lb (82 kg)	1990-10-11	Richfield, Minnesota	Tri-City Storm (USHL)	—
23	(United States)	Dylan Abood	Freshman	D	5' 8" (1.73 m)	165 lb (75 kg)	1993-05-31	Centennial, Colorado	Rio Grande Valley Killer Bees (NAHL)	—
24	(United States)	A. J. Reid	Sophomore	F	5' 10" (1.78 m)	190 lb (86 kg)	1992-09-09	Lakeville, Minnesota	Austin Bruins (NAHL)	—
25	(United States)	Tyler Rostenkowski	Freshman	D	5' 10" (1.78 m)	181 lb (82 kg)	1993-06-02	Chicago, Illinois	Amarillo Bulls (NAHL)	—
26	(United States)	Ben Carey	Junior	F	5' 11" (1.8 m)	170 lb (77 kg)	1992-12-30	Centennial, Colorado	Wenatchee Wild (NAHL)	—
27	(United States)	Erik Baskin	Freshman	F	6' 3" (1.91 m)	201 lb (91 kg)	1993-10-11	Minnetonka, Minnesota	Aberdeen Wings (NAHL)	—
30	(United States)	Chris Truehl	Sophomore	G	6' 3" (1.91 m)	205 lb (93 kg)	1993-10-27	Stoughton, Wisconsin	Johnstown Tomahawks (NAHL)	—
31	(United States)	Connor Girard	Freshman	G	6' 2" (1.88 m)	201 lb (91 kg)	1993-03-20	Edina, Minnesota	Brookings Blizzard (NAHL)	—
33	(United States)	Chris Dylewski	Sophomore	G	5' 11" (1.8 m)	165 lb (75 kg)		Colorado Springs, Colorado	Tampa Bay Jr. Bolts (Independent)	—
40	(United States)	Alex Halloran	Senior	D	5' 9" (1.75 m)	181 lb (82 kg)	1990-09-10	Salt Lake City, Utah	Cowichan Valley Capitals (BCHL)	—
52	(United States)	Jonathan Kopacka	Freshman	D	6' 1" (1.85 m)	185 lb (84 kg)	1993-05-28	Macomb, Michigan	Port Huron Fighting Falcons (NAHL)	—
55	(United States)	Michael McDonald	Senior	D	6' 5" (1.96 m)	216 lb (98 kg)	191-02-16	Mahtomedi, Minnesota	Coulee Region Chill (NAHL)	—

== Standings ==
2014–15 Atlantic Hockey standings
	Conference record							Overall record					
	GP	W	L	T	PTS	GF	GA	GP	W	L	T	GF	GA
Robert Morris †	28	19	5	4	42	106	66	37	24	8	5	133	90
Canisius	28	15	7	6	36	78	60	37	18	12	7	95	82
#16 RIT *	28	14	9	5	33	90	62	40	20	15	5	121	96
Bentley	28	14	9	5	33	76	67	37	17	15	5	100	92
Mercyhurst	28	14	11	3	31	90	87	39	19	16	4	116	122
Holy Cross	28	12	11	5	29	68	61	37	14	18	5	84	87
Air Force	28	13	12	3	29	82	82	41	16	21	4	119	130
Sacred Heart	28	10	12	6	26	77	82	38	13	19	6	96	113
Army	28	8	16	4	20	60	84	34	8	22	4	68	108
American International	28	4	17	7	15	69	107	36	4	25	7	87	155
Niagara	28	5	19	4	14	65	103	39	7	28	4	85	157
Championship: March 21, 2015 † indicates conference regular season champion; * indicates conference tournament champion Rankings: USCHO.com Top 20 Poll; updated March 23, 2015

== Schedule and results ==
Date	Time	Opponent^{#}	Rank^{#}	Site	TV	Decision	Result	Attendance	Record
Exhibition
October 5	6:05 PM	McGill*		Cadet Ice Arena • Colorado Springs, Colorado		Girard	W 5–3	1,098	
Regular Season
October 10	7:05 PM	Mercyhurst		Cadet Ice Arena • Colorado Springs, Colorado		Truehl	W 5–1	1,824	1–0–0 (1–0–0)
October 11	7:05 PM	Mercyhurst		Cadet Ice Arena • Colorado Springs, Colorado		Truehl	L 2–4	1,657	1–1–0 (1–1–0)
Brice Alaska Goal Rush
October 17	10:30 PM	at #19 Alaska*		Carlson Center • Fairbanks, Alaska (Goal Rush Semifinal)		Truehl	L 3–4	2,522	1–2–0
October 18	6:07 PM	vs. Alaska Anchorage*		Carlson Center • Fairbanks, Alaska (Goal Rush Consolation)		Truehl	L 1–4	916	1–3–0
October 24	7:05 PM	RIT		Cadet Ice Arena • Colorado Springs, Colorado		Truehl	L 1–5	2,319	1–4–0 (1–2–0)
October 25	7:05 PM	RIT		Cadet Ice Arena • Colorado Springs, Colorado		Truehl	W 4–3 ^{OT}	1,912	2–4–0 (2–2–0)
November 1	6:37 PM	at #3 North Dakota*		Ralph Engelstad Arena • Grand Forks, North Dakota (US Hockey Hall of Fame Game)		Starrett	L 2–3 ^{OT}	11,895	2–5–0
November 7	7:05 PM	Alabama–Huntsville*		Cadet Ice Arena • Colorado Springs, Colorado		Truehl	L 2–4	1,723	2–6–0
November 8	7:05 PM	Alabama–Huntsville*		Cadet Ice Arena • Colorado Springs, Colorado		Truehl	T 3–3 ^{OT}	1,556	2–6–1
November 14	5:05 PM	#17 Robert Morris		Colonials Arena • Neville Township, Pennsylvania		Truehl	T 3–3 ^{OT}	874	2–6–2 (2–2–1)
November 15	7:05 PM	#17 Robert Morris		Colonials Arena • Neville Township, Pennsylvania		Truehl	W 2–1 ^{OT}	1,069	3–6–2 (3–2–1)
November 21	7:36 PM	at #10 Denver*		Magness Arena • Denver, Colorado		Truehl	L 0–7	4,426	3–7–2
November 22	7:05 PM	Colorado College*		Cadet Ice Arena • Colorado Springs, Colorado (Rivalry)		Truehl	W 3–1	2,458	4–7–2
November 28	12:05 PM	at Canisius		LECOM Harborcenter • Buffalo, New York		Truehl	L 1–3	1,227	4–8–2 (3–3–1)
November 29	5:35 PM	at Canisius		LECOM Harborcenter • Buffalo, New York		Truehl	W 3–2	1,126	5–8–2 (4–3–1)
December 5	5:05 PM	at Bentley		John A. Ryan Arena • Waltham, Massachusetts		Truehl	L 1–2	345	5–9–2 (4–4–1)
December 6	5:05 PM	at Bentley		John A. Ryan Arena • Waltham, Massachusetts		Truehl	L 1–4	288	5–10–2 (4–5–1)
Catamount Cup
December 28	5:05 PM	at #10 Vermont*		Gutterson Fieldhouse • Burlington, Vermont (Catamount Cup Semifinal)		Truehl	L 2–4	4,007	5–11–2
December 29	2:00 PM	vs. Massachusetts*		Gutterson Fieldhouse • Burlington, Vermont (Catamount Cup Consolation Game)		Truehl	L 1–5	4,007	5–12–2
January 2	5:05 PM	at Holy Cross		Hart Center • Worcester, Massachusetts		Truehl	T 1–1 ^{OT}	964	5–12–3 (4–5–2)
January 3	5:05 PM	at Holy Cross		Hart Center • Worcester, Massachusetts		Truehl	L 1–3	714	5–13–3 (4–6–2)
January 9	7:05 PM	Niagara		Cadet Ice Arena • Colorado Springs, Colorado		Truehl	W 4–3	1,402	6–13–3 (5–6–2)
January 10	7:05 PM	Niagara		Cadet Ice Arena • Colorado Springs, Colorado		Truehl	W 4–3 ^{OT}	1,964	7–13–3 (6–6–2)
January 16	7:05 PM	Army		Cadet Ice Arena • Colorado Springs, Colorado (Rivalry)		Truehl	W 4–3	2,638	8–13–3 (7–6–2)
January 17	7:05 PM	Army		Cadet Ice Arena • Colorado Springs, Colorado (Rivalry)		Girard	W 3–1	2,500	9–13–3 (8–6–2)
January 23	5:35 PM	at American International		Olympia Ice Center • West Springfield, Massachusetts		Girard	W 2–1 ^{OT}	327	10–13–3 (9–6–2)
January 24	5:05 PM	at American International		Olympia Ice Center • West Springfield, Massachusetts		Girard	W 6–2	287	11–13–3 (10–6–2)
January 30	7:05 PM	#20 Robert Morris		Cadet Ice Arena • Colorado Springs, Colorado		Girard	L 4–5 ^{OT}	1,987	11–14–3 (10–7–2)
January 31	7:05 PM	#20 Robert Morris		Cadet Ice Arena • Colorado Springs, Colorado		Girard	L 2–5	2,074	11–15–3 (10–8–2)
February 6	5:05 PM	at Sacred Heart		Webster Bank Arena • Bridgeport, Connecticut		Girard	L 4–5 ^{OT}	148	11–16–3 (10–9–2)
February 7	5:05 PM	at Sacred Heart		Webster Bank Arena • Bridgeport, Connecticut		Truehl	L 2–3	233	11–17–3 (10–10–2)
February 13	7:05 PM	American International		Cadet Ice Arena • Colorado Springs, Colorado		Truehl	W 9–3	2,002	12–17–3 (11–10–2)
February 14	4:05 PM	American International		Cadet Ice Arena • Colorado Springs, Colorado		Truehl	W 3–1	1,774	13–17–3 (12–10–2)
February 20	5:05 PM	at Niagara		Dwyer Arena • Lewiston, New York		Truehl	L 1–6	965	13–18–3 (12–11–2)
February 21	5:05 PM	at Niagara		Dwyer Arena • Lewiston, New York		Truehl	T 4–4 ^{OT}	1,198	13–18–4 (12–11–3)
February 27	7:05 PM	Canisius		Cadet Ice Arena • Colorado Springs, Colorado		Truehl	L 1–4	1,614	13–19–4 (12–12–3)
February 28	5:05 PM	Canisius		Cadet Ice Arena • Colorado Springs, Colorado		Truehl	W 4–1	1,763	14–19–4 (13–12–3)
Atlantic Hockey Tournament
March 6	7:05 PM	American International*		Cadet Ice Arena • Colorado Springs, Colorado (First Round Game 1)		Truehl	W 6–1	1,016	15–19–4
March 7	7:05 PM	American International*		Cadet Ice Arena • Colorado Springs, Colorado (First Round Game 2)		Truehl	W 10–3	1,241	16–19–4
March 13	5:05 PM	at RIT*		Gene Polisseni Center • Henrietta, New York (Quarterfinals Game 1)	TWCS	Truehl	L 1–2	3,314	16–20–4
March 14	5:05 PM	at RIT*		Gene Polisseni Center • Henrietta, New York (Quarterfinals Game 2)	TWCS	Truehl	L 3–7	3,057	16–21–4
*Non-conference game. ^{#}Rankings from USCHO.com Poll. All times are in Mountain Time. Source:

== Scoring statistics ==
Name	Position	Games	Goals	Assists	Points	PIM
Cole Gunner	RW	41	21	25	46	42
Chad Demers	F	41	16	21	37	27
Scott Holm	F	41	16	19	35	12
A. J. Reid	C/RW	41	10	20	30	37
Erik Baskin	F	29	10	9	19	8
Tyler Ledford	F	41	2	16	18	12
Max Hartner	D	38	8	6	14	27
Ben Kucera	C	35	5	9	14	10
Ben Carey	F	41	5	9	14	12
Dan Weissenhofer	D	41	0	14	14	47
Johnny Hrabovsky	D	31	3	7	10	14
Jonathan Kopacka	D	32	1	9	10	16
Phil Boje	D	28	7	2	9	14
George Michalke	C	38	1	7	8	6
Dylan Abood	D	19	0	8	8	10
Jordan Himley	F	37	3	4	7	10
Tyler Rostenkowski	D	14	1	6	7	7
Kyle Mackey	D	28	2	4	6	30
Ryan Doucet	LW	21	2	3	5	8
Alex Halloran	D	22	2	3	5	4
Matt Meier	F	15	2	2	4	6
Mike McDonald	D	41	2	2	4	30
Will Vosejpka	F	22	0	2	2	6
Connor Girard	G	10	0	0	0	0
Chris Truehl	G	36	0	0	0	0
Bench	-	-	-	-	-	14
Total			119	207	326	409

== Goaltending statistics ==
Name	Games	Minutes	Wins	Losses	Ties	Goals Against	Saves	Shut Outs	SV %	GAA
Chris Truehl	36	2028:32	13	18	4	100	834	0	.893	2.96
Connor Girard	10	442:29	3	3	0	22	170	0	.885	2.98
Empty Net	-	28:17	-	-	-	8	-	-	-	-
Total	41	2499:18	16	21	4	130	1004	0	.885	3.12

== Rankings ==
Poll	Week																							
Poll	Pre	1	2	3	4	5	6	7	8	9	10	11	12	13	14	15	16	17	18	19	20	21	22	23 (Final)
USCHO.com	NR	NR	NR	NR	NR	NR	NR	NR	NR	NR	NR	NR	NR	NR	NR	NR	NR	NR	NR	NR	NR	NR	NR	NR
USA Today	NR	NR	NR	NR	NR	NR	NR	NR	NR	NR	NR	NR	NR	NR	NR	NR	NR	NR	NR	NR	NR	NR	NR	NR

== Awards and honors ==
Player	Award	Ref
Cole Gunner	All-Atlantic Hockey Second Team	
