= Lorelei Nicoll =

Canadian politician

Member of the Nova Scotia House of Assembly for Cole Harbour-Dartmouth
- In office August 17, 2021 – October 27, 2024
- Preceded by: first member
- Succeeded by: Brad McGowan

Personal details
- Born: Petit-de-Grat, Nova Scotia
- Party: Liberal

Lorelei Nicoll is a Canadian politician, who was elected to the Nova Scotia House of Assembly in the 2021 Nova Scotia general election. She represents the riding of Cole Harbour-Dartmouth as a member of the Nova Scotia Liberal Party. As of September 22, 2024, Nicoll serves as the Official Opposition critic for Labour, Skills, and Advanced Education; Municipal Affairs; and the Status of Women.

Prior to her election to the legislature, Nicoll served on Halifax Regional Council.

In October 2024, Nicoll announced that she would not be running in the next Nova Scotia general election.

== Electoral record ==
2021 Nova Scotia general election: Cole Harbour-Dartmouth
Party	Candidate	Votes	%	±%	Expenditures
Liberal	Lorelei Nicoll	5,144	52.24	+11.16	$34,630.97
Progressive Conservative	Karina Sanford	2,929	29.75	-1.43	$29,376.03
New Democratic	Melody Pentland	1,558	15.82	-7.97	$28,869.80
Green	Rana Zaman	215	2.18	-1.37	$3,686.54
Total valid votes/expense limit		9,846	99.62	–	$92,404.43
Total rejected ballots		38	0.38		
Turnout		9,884	61.03		
Eligible voters		16,196			
Liberal notional hold		Swing		+6.30	
Source: Elections Nova Scotia
