= Tony Ince =

Canadian politician

The Honourable Tony Ince ECNS

Canadian Senator from Nova Scotia
- Incumbent
- Assumed office March 7, 2025
- Nominated by: Justin Trudeau
- Appointed by: Mary Simon

Member of the Nova Scotia House of Assembly for Cole Harbour Cole Harbour-Portland Valley (2013-2021)
- In office October 8, 2013 – October 27, 2024
- Preceded by: Darrell Dexter
- Succeeded by: Leah Martin

Personal details
- Born: Robert Anthony Ince; December 16, 1957 (age 68) Halifax, Nova Scotia, Canada
- Party: Liberal

Robert Anthony "Tony" Ince (born December 16, 1957) is a Canadian politician, who was elected to the Nova Scotia House of Assembly in the 2013 provincial election, representing the electoral district of Cole Harbour for the Nova Scotia Liberal Party where he defeated the incumbent, Premier Darrell Dexter. In October 2024, Ince announced that he would not seek reelection.

== Early life and education ==
Ince was born in Halifax and worked as counsellor with the Department of Community Services. He also worked as a project coordinator with the Black Educators Association.

== Political career ==
Ince ran in the 2009 provincial election losing to Dexter. He was elected in the 2013 provincial election.

On October 22, 2013, Ince was appointed to the Executive Council of Nova Scotia where he served as Minister of Communities, Culture and Heritage as well as Minister of African Nova Scotian Affairs and the Minister responsible for the Heritage Property Act.

Ince was re-elected in the 2017 election. On June 15, 2017, premier Stephen McNeil shuffled his cabinet, moving Ince to Minister of the Public Service Commission, while keeping the Minister of African Nova Scotian Affairs portfolio.

As of September 22, 2024, Ince serves as the Official Opposition critic for the Public Service Commission, Military Relations, and African Nova Scotian Affairs.

In October 2024, Ince announced that he would not run in the next Nova Scotia general election to spend more time with family.

On March 7, 2025, he was appointed to the Senate of Canada on the advice of Prime Minister Justin Trudeau.

== Electoral record ==
2021 Nova Scotia general election: Cole Harbour
Party	Candidate	Votes	%	±%	Expenditures
Liberal	Tony Ince	2,118	39.75	+5.01	$25,071.93
Progressive Conservative	Darryl Johnson	1,704	31.98	-0.64	$25,039.43
New Democratic	Jerome Lagmay	1,431	26.86	-1.46	$20,436.91
Atlantica	Chris Kinnie	75	1.41	–	$200.00
Total valid votes/expense limit		5,328	99.46		$62,536.79
Total rejected ballots		29	0.54		
Turnout		5,357	52.90		
Eligible voters		10,126			
Liberal hold		Swing		+2.83	
Source: Elections Nova Scotia

2017 Nova Scotia general election: Cole Harbour-Portland Valley
Party	Candidate	Votes	%	±%
Liberal	Tony Ince	3,583	36.85	-4.18
Progressive Conservative	Chris Mont	3,203	32.94	+14.80
New Democratic	Andre Cain	2,552	26.25	-14.57
Green	Melanie Mulrooney	385	3.96	
Total valid votes		9,723	100.0	
Total rejected ballots		41	0.42	
Turnout		9,764	54.30	
Eligible voters		17,982		
Liberal hold		Swing		-18.98
Source: Elections Nova Scotia

2013 Nova Scotia general election
Party	Candidate	Votes	%	±%
Liberal	Tony Ince	4,002	41.03	N/A
New Democratic Party	Darrell Dexter	3,981	40.82	N/A
Progressive Conservative	Greg Frampton	1,769	18.14	N/A

2009 Nova Scotia general election
Party	Candidate	Votes	%	±%
New Democratic Party	Darrell Dexter	5,847	68.83	
Liberal	Tony Ince	1,519	17.88	
Progressive Conservative	Mike Josey	930	10.95	
Green	Donna Toews	199	2.34	–
