= Cole Harbour-Dartmouth =

Provincial electoral district in Nova Scotia, Canada

Nova Scotia electoral district

Provincial electoral district
- Legislature: Nova Scotia House of Assembly
MLA
Brad McGowan
Progressive Conservative
- District created: 2019
- First contested: 2024

Demographics
- Area (km²): 14
- Census division: Halifax Regional Municipality
- Census subdivision: Halifax Regional Municipality

Cole Harbour-Dartmouth is a provincial electoral district in Nova Scotia, Canada, that elects one member of the Nova Scotia House of Assembly.

This riding was created in 2019, following the recommendations of the 2018 Electoral Boundaries Commission. This riding was first contested in the 2021 election.

== Geography ==
The land area of Cole Harbour-Dartmouth is 14 km^{2} (5.4 sq mi).

== Members of the Legislative Assembly ==
This riding has elected the following MLAs:

Cole Harbour-Dartmouth
Legislature	Years	Member	Party
Riding created from Cole Harbour-Eastern Passage, Cole Harbour-Portland Valley and Dartmouth South
64th	2021–2024	Lorelei Nicoll	Liberal
65th	2024–present	Brad McGowan	Progressive Conservative

== Election results ==
=== 2024 ===
2024 Nova Scotia general election
** Preliminary results — Not yet official **
Party	Candidate	Votes	%	±%
Progressive Conservative	Brad McGowan	4,243	51.64	+21.90
New Democratic	Kayley Dixon	2,079	25.30	+9.48
Liberal	Vishal Bhardwaj	1,894	23.05	-29.19
Total valid votes		8,216	99.46	
Total rejected ballots		45	0.54	
Turnout		8,261	49.45	-11.58
Eligible voters		16,707		
Progressive Conservative gain from Liberal		Swing		+25.54

=== 2021 ===
2021 Nova Scotia general election
Party	Candidate	Votes	%	±%	Expenditures
Liberal	Lorelei Nicoll	5,144	52.24	+11.16	$34,630.97
Progressive Conservative	Karina Sanford	2,929	29.75	-1.43	$29,376.03
New Democratic	Melody Pentland	1,558	15.82	-7.97	$28,869.80
Green	Rana Zaman	215	2.18	-1.37	$3,686.54
Total valid votes/expense limit		9,846	99.62	–	$92,404.43
Total rejected ballots		38	0.38		
Turnout		9,884	61.03		
Eligible voters		16,196			
Liberal notional hold		Swing		+6.30	
Source: Elections Nova Scotia

=== 2017 redistributed results ===
2017 provincial election redistributed results
Party	Vote	%
Liberal	2,743	41.08
Progressive Conservative	2,082	31.18
New Democratic	1,589	23.80
Green	237	3.55
Atlantica	26	0.39

== See also ==
- List of Nova Scotia provincial electoral districts
- Canadian provincial electoral districts
