= Dartmouth-Cole Harbour (provincial electoral district) =

Former provincial electoral district in Nova Scotia, Canada

Nova Scotia electoral district

Defunct provincial electoral district
- Legislature: Nova Scotia House of Assembly
- District created: 1993
- District abolished: 2003
- Last contested: 1999

Dartmouth-Cole Harbour was a provincial electoral district in Nova Scotia, Canada, that elected one member of the Nova Scotia House of Assembly. It existed from 1993 to 2003.

== Members of the Legislative Assembly ==
Dartmouth-Cole Harbour elected the following members to the Legislative Assembly:

Dartmouth-Cole Harbour
Legislature	Years	Member	Party
56th	1993–1998	Alan Mitchell	Liberal
57th	1998–1999	Darrell Dexter	New Democratic
58th	1999–2003	Darrell Dexter	New Democratic

== Election results ==
=== 1999 ===
1999 Nova Scotia general election
Party	Candidate	Votes	%	±%
New Democratic	Darrell Dexter	3,164	37.95%	-4.35%
Progressive Conservative	Gregory E. Frampton	2,750	32.98%	9.26%
Liberal	Peter Foy	2,150	25.79%	-8.20%
Nova Scotia Party	Rufus Peacock	274	3.29%	–
Total		8,338	–	
Source(s) Source: Nova Scotia Legislature (2024). "Electoral History for Dartmouth-Cole Harbour" (PDF). nslegislature.ca. Nova Scotia, Chief Electoral Officer (1999). Returns of the General Election for the House of Assembly, Thirty-Fifth General Election (Report). Elections Nova Scotia.

=== 1998 ===
1998 Nova Scotia general election
Party	Candidate	Votes	%	±%
New Democratic	Darrell Dexter	3,717	42.30%	17.58%
Liberal	Alan Mitchell	2,986	33.98%	-9.99%
Progressive Conservative	Michael L. MacDonald	2,084	23.72%	-7.60%
Total		8,787	–	
Source(s) Source: Nova Scotia Legislature (2024). "Electoral History for Dartmouth-Cole Harbour" (PDF). nslegislature.ca.

=== 1993 ===
1993 Nova Scotia general election
Party	Candidate	Votes	%	±%
Liberal	Alan Mitchell	4,079	43.97%	–
Progressive Conservative	Michael L. MacDonald	2,905	31.31%	–
New Democratic	Gail Cann	2,293	24.72%	–
Total		9,277	–	
Source(s) Source: Nova Scotia Legislature (2024). "Electoral History for Dartmouth-Cole Harbour" (PDF). nslegislature.ca. Nova Scotia, Chief Electoral Officer (1993). Returns of the General Election for the House of Assembly, Thirty-Third General Election (PDF) (Report). Queen's Printer. Archived from the original (PDF) on 18 June 2018.

== See also ==
- List of Nova Scotia provincial electoral districts
- Canadian provincial electoral districts
