= Chris Rumble =

American ice hockey player (born 1990)

- Born: April 16, 1990 (age 35) Harrisburg, Pennsylvania, U.S.
- Height: 6 ft 1 in (185 cm)
- Weight: 195 lb (88 kg; 13 st 13 lb)
- Position: Defence
- Shot: Left
- team: Free Agent
- Played for: Evansville IceMen; Binghamton Senators; Fischtown Pinguins; Iserlohn Roosters; Stavanger Oilers; Steinbach Black Wings Linz
- NHL draft: Undrafted
- Playing career: 2015–2022

Chris Rumble (born April 16, 1990) is an American former professional ice hockey defenceman.

== Playing career ==
Prior to turning professional, Rumble attended Canisius College where he played three seasons with the Canisius Golden Griffins men's ice hockey team which competes in the NCAA Division I Atlantic Hockey conference. In his freshman season he helped the Golden Griffins capture the 2012-13 Atlantic Hockey championship, and in his junior year his outstanding play was rewarded when he was named to the Atlantic Hockey All-Conference First Team.

On September 20, 2017, Rumble signed his first European contract in agreeing to a one-year deal with German outfit, the Fischtown Pinguins of the DEL.

Rumble played through two season with the Pinguins, before leaving as free agent to sign a one-year deal with fellow DEL competitors, Iserlohn Roosters, on May 10, 2019.

== Awards and honors ==
Award	Year
College
Atlantic Hockey All-Tournament Team	2014
All-Atlantic Hockey First Team	2014–15
