= HMCS Yukon =

Several Canadian naval units have been named HMCS Yukon.

- HMCS Yukon (DDE 263) was a Cold War-era Mackenzie-class destroyer.
- HMCS Yukon was a planned Canada-class submarine cancelled in 1989.
