= Michael L. MacDonald =

Canadian politician

The Honourable Michael L. MacDonald
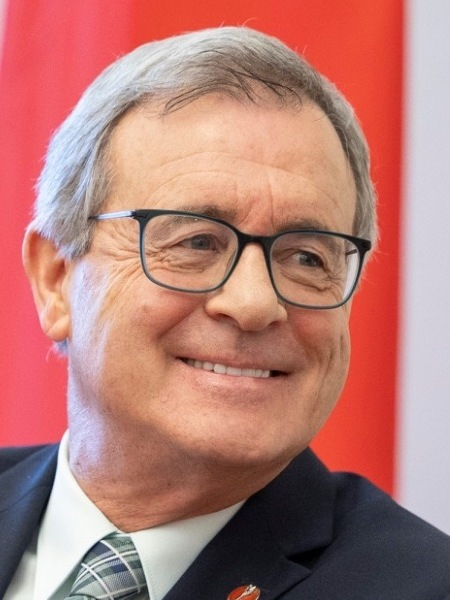

Canadian Senator from Nova Scotia (Cape Breton)
- Incumbent
- Assumed office January 2, 2009
- Nominated by: Stephen Harper
- Appointed by: Michaëlle Jean

Personal details
- Born: May 4, 1955 (age 70) Louisbourg, Nova Scotia, Canada
- Party: Conservative

Michael L. MacDonald (born May 4, 1955) is a Canadian politician and a Conservative member of the Canadian Senate. He was appointed on the advice of Stephen Harper to the Senate of Canada on January 2, 2009.

== Early life and education ==
MacDonald was born in Louisbourg, the youngest of 10 children. In 1977, he graduated from University of King's College in Halifax with an Honours degree in political science.

== Political career ==
MacDonald worked as a researcher for the Progressive Conservative Party of Canada Research Office from 1978 to 1980. He then worked in the office of MLA Gerald Sheehy from 1980 to 1982 and then as Executive Assistant to Premier John Buchanan from 1982 to 1984. He was also Executive Assistant to Thomas McMillan from 1984 to 1985, and then to Stewart McInnes from 1985 to 1987.

He has been the owner of the Fortress Inn in Louisbourg since 1988.

In 1988, he ran for federal office in Cape Breton—East Richmond, placing second with 7,173 votes. In 1993, he ran provincially for the Progressive Conservative Association of Nova Scotia in the riding of Dartmouth-Cole Harbour, placing second with 2,905 votes. He ran in Dartmouth-Cole Harbour again in 1998, placing third with 2,084 votes. He ran federally in 2004 in the riding of Dartmouth—Cole Harbour, placing third with 8,739 votes.

== Controversy ==
On February 16, 2022, during the convoy protest in Ottawa, MacDonald was recorded in a video making derisive remarks about the city's residents, saying, "I’m so sick of the entitlement in this country and this f------ city. Everybody around this city, with their six-figure salaries and twenty-hour weeks." He also expressed support for the protesters, saying, "...in Ottawa I don't want them to leave," and described his wife as "a Karen" for wanting the protest to end.

MacDonald later read a statement in the Senate chamber to apologize for his remarks.

== Personal life ==
MacDonald lives in Dartmouth, Nova Scotia, with his wife Marilyn, and their two sons, Lauchlan and Liam.
