= Luke Jenkins =

English association football player

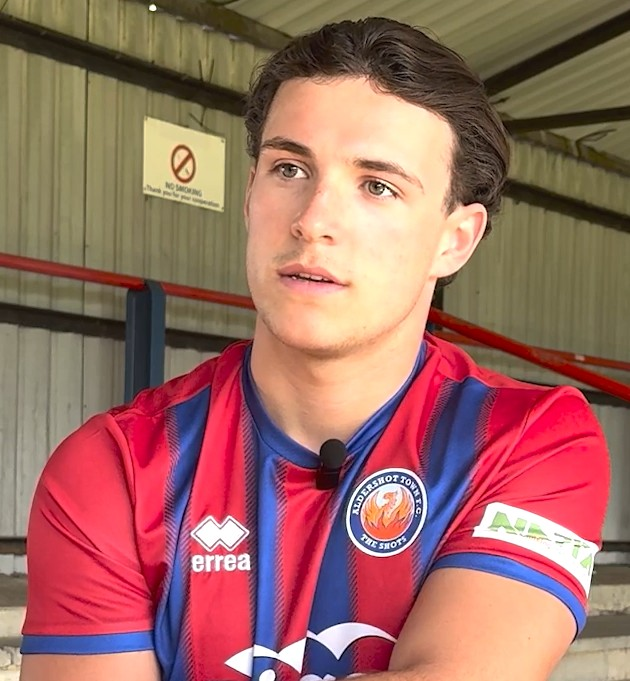
- Jenkins in June 2024

Personal information
- Full name: Luke Jenkins
- Date of birth: 7 October 2002 (age 24)
- Place of birth: Greenwich, England
- Height: 1.88 m (6 ft 2 in)
- Position: Defender

Team information
- Current team: Aldershot Town
- Number: 4

Youth career
- Crystal Palace
- 2018–2019: Sutton United
- 2019–2021: AFC Wimbledon

Senior career*
Years	Team	Apps	(Gls)
2021–2023	AFC Wimbledon	3	(1)
2021–2022	→ Tonbridge Angels (loan)	8	(0)
2022	→ Hampton & Richmond Borough (loan)	9	(0)
2023	→ Weymouth (loan)	4	(0)
2023–2024	Chelmsford City	38	(3)
2024–2026	Aldershot Town	19	(0)

International career
2024	England C	1	(0)
- * Club domestic league appearances and goals as of 19:45, 27 April 2026 (UTC)

Luke Jenkins (born 7 October 2002) is an English professional footballer who plays as a defender for National League club Aldershot Town.

== Career ==
=== AFC Wimbledon ===
Previously with Crystal Palace and Sutton United, Jenkins joined AFC Wimbledon in 2019 and went on to make his first-team debut during an EFL Trophy group-stage tie in October 2021 against former side, Crystal Palace U23s, featuring for 53 minutes in the 2–0 defeat. On 9 November 2021, he made a subsequent appearance, once again coming in the EFL Trophy, replacing Darius Charles in the 61st minute during Wimbledon's 1–0 defeat to another former side of Jenkins', Sutton United.

On 16 December 2021, Jenkins joined National League South side Tonbridge Angels on a one-month loan deal.

On 25 March 2023, following loan spells at Hampton & Richmond Borough and Weymouth, Jenkins made his league debut in a 2–1 loss against Barrow, opening the scoring after just five minutes.

Following the culmination of the 2022–23 season, Jenkins was released by Wimbledon.

=== Chelmsford City ===
On 15 July 2023, after a successful trial period, Jenkins signed for Chelmsford City. On 2 October 2023, Jenkins scored his first goal for the club against Bromsgrove Sporting in the FA Cup. In March 2023, Jenkins was called up to the England C team, becoming the first Chelmsford player since Ricky Holmes in 2008 to be called up to the side. On 15 May 2024, Chelmsford City announced Jenkins had left the club in order to play at a higher level.

=== Aldershot Town ===
On 7 June 2024, it was announced that Jenkins had signed for National League side Aldershot Town. On 27 April 2026, it was announced that Jenkins would leave the club at the end of his contract in June.

== Career statistics ==
As of match played 16 April 2023

Appearances and goals by club, season and competition
Club	Season	League			FA Cup		League Cup		Other		Total	
Club	Season	Division	Apps	Goals	Apps	Goals	Apps	Goals	Apps	Goals	Apps	Goals
AFC Wimbledon	2021–22	League One	0	0	0	0	0	0	2 (Note: Appearances in the EFL Trophy)	0	2	0
AFC Wimbledon	2022–23	League Two	3	1	0	0	0	0	2	0	5	1
Career total			3	1	0	0	0	0	4	0	7	1
