= Alan Mitchell (politician) =

Canadian politician

The Honourable Alan Mitchell ECNS

MLA for Dartmouth-Cole Harbour
- In office 1993–1998
- Preceded by: new riding
- Succeeded by: Darrell Dexter

Minister of Justice
- In office April 2, 1997 – April 8, 1998
- Preceded by: Jay Abbass
- Succeeded by: Jim Smith

Personal details
- Born: 1945 (age 80–81)
- Party: Liberal
- Occupation: Lawyer

Alan E. Mitchell is a former Canadian politician. He represented the electoral district of Dartmouth-Cole Harbour in the Nova Scotia House of Assembly from 1993 to 1998. He was a member of the Nova Scotia Liberal Party.

Mitchell was elected in the 1993 provincial election, defeating Progressive Conservative Michael MacDonald by almost 1,200 votes. He served as a backbench member of John Savage's government until April 2, 1997, when Savage appointed him to the Executive Council of Nova Scotia as Minister of Justice. Mitchell continued in the portfolio when Russell MacLellan took over as premier in July 1997. Mitchell was defeated by New Democrat Darrell Dexter when he ran for re-election in 1998.
