= Brad McGowan =

Canadian politician

Member of the Nova Scotia House of Assembly for Cole Harbour-Dartmouth
- Incumbent
- Assumed office November 26, 2024
- Preceded by: Lorelei Nicoll

Personal details
- Party: Progressive Conservative Association of Nova Scotia

Brad McGowan is a Canadian politician who was elected to the Nova Scotia House of Assembly in the 2024 general election, representing Cole Harbour-Dartmouth as a member of the Progressive Conservative Association of Nova Scotia.
