= John A. Ryan Arena =

Hockey rink in Watertown, Massachusetts

Coordinates: 42.365092°N 71.209082°W

John A. Ryan Skating Arena
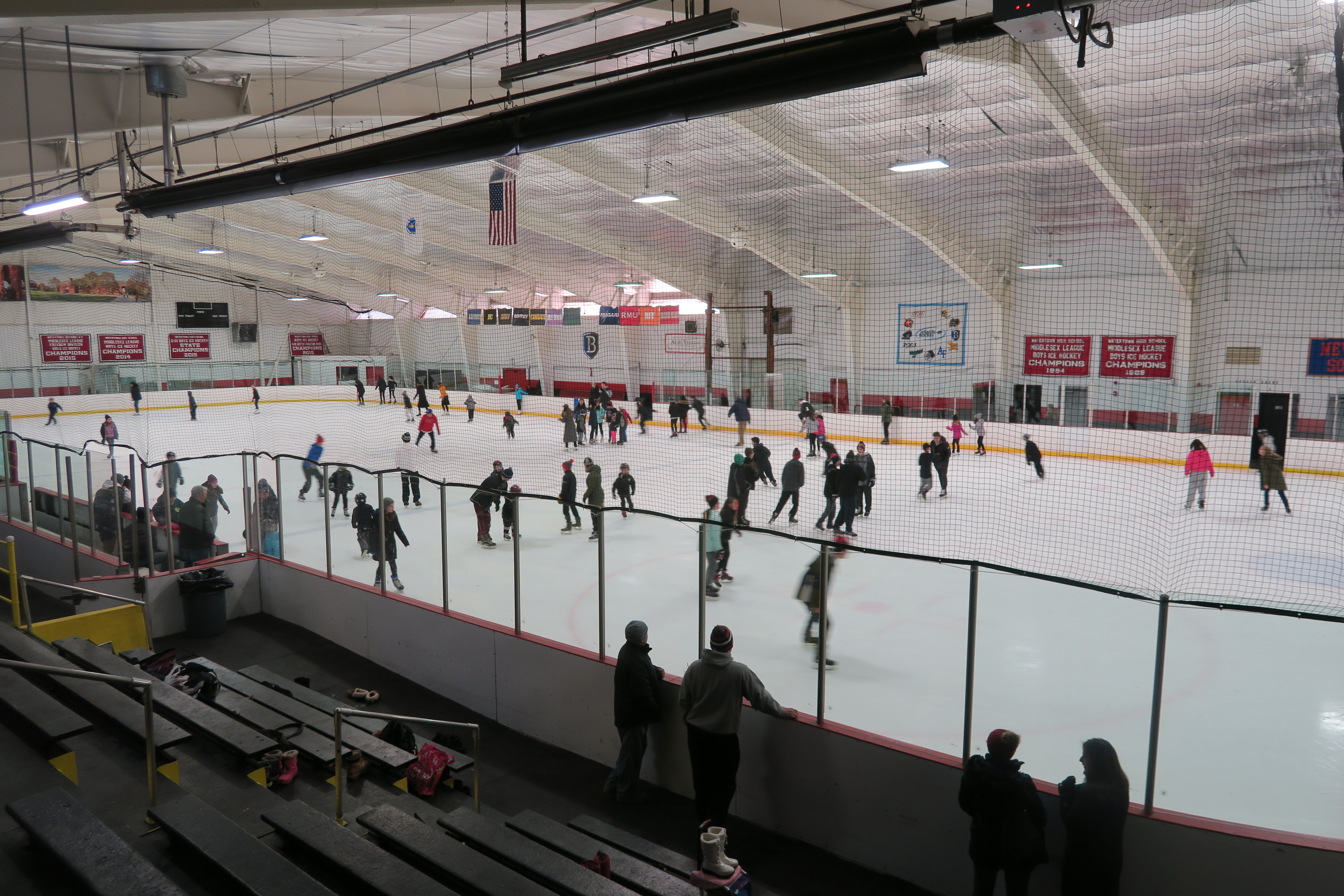
- Interactive map of John A. Ryan Skating Arena
- Location: 1 Paramount Pl; Watertown, MA 02472
- Owner: City of Watertown
- Operator: City of Watertown
- Capacity: 1,250 (hockey)

Tenants
- Bentley Falcons men's ice hockey (1977-2018); East Coast Jumbos

The John A. Ryan Skating Arena is a 1,000-seat hockey rink owned and operated by the city of Watertown, Massachusetts. It served as the home ice of the Bentley University Falcons men's ice hockey team from 1977 to 2018, until the team moved into its new on-campus home, the Bentley Arena, in February 2018. The John A. Ryan Skating Arena is home to local teams and MIAA tournament games. The JAR, as it is affectionately known as, lies on the banks of the Charles River. The arena is also home to the East Coast Jumbos, who are a special needs hockey team. They also play at the MacDowell Ice Arena at the Rivers School.
