= 2024–25 Atlantic Hockey America men's season =

2024–25 AHA men's season
- Season: 2024–25
- Conference: AHA
- Division: Division I
- Sport: men's ice hockey
- Duration: October 4, 2024– March 28, 2025
- Number of teams: 11
- TV partner(s): FloHockey

Regular season
- Season champions: Holy Cross
- Season MVP: Liam McLinskey
- Top scorer: Liam McLinskey

Atlantic Hockey America Tournament
- Tournament champions: Bentley
- Runners-up: Holy Cross
- Tournament MVP: Connor Hasley
- Top scorer: A. J. Hodges

NCAA tournament
- Bids: 1
- Record: 0–1
- Best Finish: Regional Semifinal
- Team(s): Bentley

The 2024–25 Atlantic Hockey America men's season was the inaugural season of play for Atlantic Hockey America and took place during the 2024–25 NCAA Division I men's ice hockey season. The season began on October 4, 2024, and concluded on March 28, 2024, with Bentley losing in the Manchester Regional Semifinal of the NCAA tournament.

This is the only Atlantic Hockey America season, and last Division I season, for American International, which had been a member of AHA's men's predecessor of the Atlantic Hockey Association for that league's entire existence. On November 11, 2024, American International College announced that its men's hockey team would join the bulk of AIC's other sports in the Northeast-10 Conference, which plays the sport under NCAA Division II regulations and does not participate in the Division I championship.

== Offseason ==
After the conclusion of the previous season, the men's Atlantic Hockey Association and women's College Hockey America merged to form Atlantic Hockey America. The amalgamation did not change the new league's arrangement as the same number of teams were on the men's side. The standings, conference schedules, and tournament all continued without alteration.

== Coaches ==
Army head coach Brian Riley announced prior to the season that he would retire after this campaign.

=== Records ===
Team	Head coach	Season at school	Record at school	Atlantic Hockey record *
Air Force	Frank Serratore	28	456–436–99	245–168–69
American International	Eric Lang	9	142–115–28	111–68–23
Army	Brian Riley	22	242–359–92	199–251–83
Bentley	Andy Jones	2	16–17–2	12–12–2
Canisius	Trevor Large	7	100–119–23	78–78–16
Holy Cross	Bill Riga	4	50–58–9	35–36–7
Mercyhurst	Rick Gotkin	37	607–523–107	260–227–67
Niagara	Jason Lammers	8	95–129–24	69–84–24
RIT	Wayne Wilson	26	464–314–80	264–160–55
Robert Morris	Derek Schooley	19	286–300–71	142–121–41
Sacred Heart	C. J. Marottolo	16	188–291–55	154–195–46

* Record in the previous conference.

== Standings ==
2024–25 Atlantic Hockey America Standings
	Conference record										Overall record					
	GP	W	L	T	OW	OL	SW	PTS	GF	GA	GP	W	L	T	GF	GA
Holy Cross †	26	19	5	2	4	0	1	56	92	47	40	24	14	2	130	94
Sacred Heart	26	16	7	3	1	1	2	53	80	64	39	21	13	5	118	101
#19 Bentley *	26	16	9	1	1	2	1	51	79	57	40	23	15	2	115	83
Niagara	26	15	9	2	3	3	1	48	90	70	37	18	16	3	124	109
Army	26	14	10	2	2	0	2	44	84	74	38	16	20	2	105	117
Canisius	26	11	13	2	0	3	0	38	84	79	37	12	23	2	98	120
Air Force	26	11	13	2	2	3	1	37	59	58	40	16	21	3	86	112
American International	26	9	16	1	0	3	0	31	63	77	38	13	23	2	92	117
RIT	26	9	15	2	2	0	1	28	65	102	35	10	23	2	82	133
Robert Morris	26	7	15	4	1	2	1	27	72	86	35	10	20	5	95	115
Mercyhurst	26	4	19	3	1	0	2	16	59	113	35	4	27	4	77	150
Championship: March 22, 2025 † indicates conference regular season champion (DeGregorio Trophy) * indicates conference tournament champion (Riley Trophy); Rankings: USCHO.com Top 20 Poll

=== Regular season record ===
For its first season as Atlantic Hockey America, the conference had dreadful results in their non-conference play. None of the conference members had a winning record outside of league play while almost half of the programs had one or fewer wins. Unsurprisingly, this left the conference lagging behind in the PairWise with most teams sitting in the bottom quarter of the rankings. Individually, AHA did not fare well against any of the other conferences with the league only able to earn a winning record versus independent programs.

Team	Big Ten	CCHA	ECAC Hockey	Hockey East	Independent	NCHC	Total
Air Force	0–1–0	0–0–0	0–1–1	0–1–0	2–0–0	1–3–0	3–6–1
American International	0–1–1	0–0–0	0–1–0	0–3–0	2–0–0	0–0–0	2–5–1
Army	0–1–0	0–0–0	0–2–0	0–3–0	0–1–0	0–0–0	0–7–0
Bentley	0–0–0	0–0–0	0–2–0	1–3–0	1–0–1	0–0–0	2–5–1
Canisius	0–4–0	0–0–0	0–4–0	0–0–0	0–0–0	0–0–0	0–8–0
Holy Cross	0–0–0	0–1–0	0–1–0	1–3–0	0–1–0	0–1–0	1–7–0
Mercyhurst	0–2–0	0–2–0	0–3–1	0–0–0	0–0–0	0–0–0	0–7–1
Niagara	0–0–0	0–0–0	1–4–1	0–0–0	1–1–0	0–0–0	2–5–1
RIT	0–0–0	0–2–0	1–3–0	0–2–0	0–0–0	0–0–0	1–7–0
Robert Morris	0–0–0	0–0–0	0–0–0	0–1–0	1–1–0	2–3–0	3–5–0
Sacred Heart	0–0–0	0–0–0	2–1–2	1–2–0	0–0–0	0–0–0	3–3–2
Overall	0–9–1	0–5–0	4–22–5	3–18–0	7–4–1	3–7–0	17–65–7

== Statistics ==
=== Leading scorers ===
GP = Games played; G = Goals; A = Assists; Pts = Points; PIM = Penalty minutes

Player	Class	Team	GP	G	A	Pts	PIM
Liam McLinskey	Senior	Holy Cross	26	19	20	39	12
Mac Gadowsky	Sophomore	Army	26	11	22	33	4
Matthew Wilde	Sophomore	RIT	23	17	14	31	22
Tyler Fukakusa	Sophomore	RIT	26	8	23	31	16
Ethan Leyh	Graduate	Bentley	25	12	18	30	21
Matteo Giampa	Sophomore	Canisius	26	8	21	29	10
Trevor Hoskin	Freshman	Niagara	25	9	20	29	10
Félix Trudeau	Junior	Sacred Heart	26	11	17	28	48
Shane Ott	Senior	Niagara	26	6	18	24	8
Devin Phillips	Junior	Holy Cross	22	7	16	23	4
Jay Ahearn	Senior	Niagara	25	10	13	23	0

=== Leading goaltenders ===
Minimum 1/3 of team's minutes played in conference games.
GP = Games played; Min = Minutes played; W = Wins; L = Losses; T = Ties; GA = Goals against; SO = Shutouts; SV% = Save percentage; GAA = Goals against average

Player	Class	Team	GP	Min	W	L	T	GA	SO	SV%	GAA
Thomas Gale	Senior	Holy Cross	26	1547:14	19	5	2	44	2	.940	1.71
Ethan Robertson	Sophomore	Canisius	14	612:59	7	2	0	19	1	.932	1.86
Connor Hasley	Junior	Bentley	24	1425:41	15	8	1	47	8	.921	1.98
Gundarah Ajeet	Freshman	Sacred Heart	21	1118:09	14	4	3	37	3	.929	1.99
Guy Blessing	Senior	Air Force	25	1495:02	10	13	2	52	3	.919	2.09

== Conference tournament ==
Note: Teams are reseeded after the First Round and Quarterfinals.

First Round; February 28–March 1
6	Canisius	2
11	Mercyhurst	0
7	Air Force	4**
10	Robert Morris	3
8	American International	2*
9	RIT	1

Quarterfinals; March 7–9
1	Holy Cross	2	3	4*
8	American International	3	2	3
2	Sacred Heart	4	2	4
7	Air Force	1	3	1
3	Bentley	4	2	-
6	Canisius	0	0	-
4	Niagara	2	4	3
5	Army	3**	3	4*

Semifinals; March 14–16
1	Holy Cross	3*	5	-
5	Army	2	1	-
2	Sacred Heart	2	0	-
3	Bentley	5	3	-

Championship; March 22
1	Holy Cross	3
3	Bentley	6

Note: * denotes overtime period(s)

== NCAA tournament ==
=== Regional semifinals ===
March 28, 2025; 2:00 pm	(1) Boston College	3–1 (1–0, 0–1, 2–0)	(4) Bentley	SNHU Arena; Attendance: 7,368

Game reference

Jacob Fowler
Goalies
Connor Hasley
Referees:
Sterling Egan
Bruce Vida Jr.
Linesmen:
Patrick Giles
Nick Huff

(Leonard, J. Hagens) Gabe Perreault (16) – 16:45	1–0
	1–1	23:21 – PP – Ethan Leyh (17) (Castagna, Bochen)
(Minnetian, Fortescue) James Hagens (11) – GW – 58:43	2–1
(Hreschuk) Ryan Leonard (30) – EN – 59:28	3–1

6 min
Penalties
10 min
44
Shots
21

Game summary
The game started with BC being able to get the puck in deep while the Falcons could barely get over the blueline. While neither team was able to establish any real zone time, the Eagles were able to get several shots on Connor Hasley in the first few minutes. On one such exchange around the 4-minute mark, Hasley was unable to freeze the puck but got a lucky break when the ref lost sight of the puck and blew the whistle erroneously. Around the same time, Ryan Leonard ran into Hasley after being knocked down and the two forced the net off its moorings. On a later play, Hasley was able to push the net out of place with his leg, continuing an issue that the ice crew had been dealing with since before the start of the match. The game was paused for several minutes to give the maintenance team time to try and reset the pegs. On the ensuing play, Bentley appeared to commit two separate infractions, at least according to the BC faithful, but the referees disagreed. With the Eagles unable to buy a questionable call, Boston College started trying to push Bentley around after the whistle to see if they could goad one of the Falcons into making a mistake. While BC attempted to plant that seed, they persisted with the offensive pressure. The Eagles were able to tilt the ice towards the Falcons' end and set up in the offensive zone and besieged Hasley for several minutes in the middle of the period. A further potential Bentley penalty went uncalled by the referees who appeared to have decided to just let the two teams play. In spite of the lack of power plays, BC led in shots 10–0 halfway through the period. Bentley got a break when BC committed an icing call, giving the Falcons their first offensive zone draw of the game with 9 minutes to play. BC won the faceoff but then immediately iced the puck a second time. The second draw was a little closer but BC still managed to clear the zone. Moments later, the first penalty of the game was on Aidan Hreschuk for crosschecking. Many in the crowd were in disbelief with the borderline call after the earlier plays that had been let go. BC went on the attack during the disadvantage and was able to get a disjointed break on the Benley goal. After the Falcons regain possession they were able to set up their power play and get their first two shots of the match. While he had not seen any action to that point, Jacob Fowler was equal to the task. Once even strength play resumed, BC tried to get right back to their dominant play. Bentley, however, was able to built off their failed power play and finally break through the Boston College defense. Play evened out in the later part of the period but a bad turnover at the far blueline led to a rush up the ice by BC. Leonard found Gabe Perreault open down low and the winger moved around Hasley and slipped the puck into the net. Undaunted, Bentley went on the attack to try and get the goal back but they were unable to get a good shot on goal. With about a minute to play, the BC goal had trouble staying in position so the game was paused for a second time to fix the problem. When play resumed for a second time, BC's upped their offensive pressure. Hasley was forced to scramble but managed to keep the puck out until the horn sounded.

The second began with the two teams exchanging chances off the rush and, after a minute, the net behind Hasley was knocked from its mooring. On the ensuing play, BC was able to halt a Bentley rush but Lukas Gustafsson took a tripping minor in doing so. The Falcons had trouble setting up in the offensive zone but when they were finally able to do so, Ethan Leyh got two solid shots on goal, the second of which beat Fowler. After the ensuing faceoff, BC was able to finally draw it first power play with Jake Black grabbed James Hagens twice. The BC man-advantage was able to get several good looks at the goal but Bentley was able to block several shots while the rest either went wide or were stopped by Hasley. After Bentley iced the puck, the Falcon net was knocked out of place for the third time and the game paused once again to try and resolve the issue. After what was essentially an extra TV timeout, Bentley was able to clear the puck and relieve the pressure. Boston College remained in control for long stretches with occasional counters by Bentley. Near the middle of the period, Hasley bobbled a glove save but with no Eagle nearby the goaltender was able to smother the puck for a faceoff. By the midway point of the game it was apparent that Boston College was the better of the two and Bentley was only in the match thanks to a herculean defensive effort. Even, so, the game was tied and Nik Armstrong-Kingkade nearly gave the Falcons the lead when he hit the post on a solo rush. Just seconds later, the Falcons made a bad line change and were called for too many men. Boston College's second power play appeared to work to perfection and Perreault had a half-open cage but the puck was on edge and his shot went high and wide. Afterwards, the teams took matching minors that didn't change the makeup of the game but did take two of the top players off of the ice. When play resumed, the net behind Hasley was knocked off for the fourth time on the night and the problem was becoming as much of a story in the game as the players. The stoppage helped to kill off the rest of the BC power play as well as slow down the pace of play. The two teams carried the puck up and down the ice but neither was able to generate a good scoring chance for several minutes. With under 3 minutes to play, Bentley got on the attack but hit the post with another shot. The waning moments saw both team trying and failing to break through the defenses and the period ended with the two squads knotted at one.

Early in the third, Bentley was able to turn over the puck in the BC end and get themselves a couple of good looks at the net but strong play from the Eagle defense prevent either opportunity from reaching Fowler. Boston College countered and got a hard shot on goal that Hasley was unable to cover but the Falcons were first on the puck and able to clear it from danger. Further strong play from both the BC and Bentley defenses kept the puck out of the respective goals and both teams seemed dead set on doing everything they could to keep the other from scoring. Despite the emphasis in their own ends, the two teams were able to generate several scoring opportunities but neither could follow up after the initial shot. BC continued to press in spite of their failed attempts and eventually drew another power play when Armstrong-Kingkade was called for kneeing in the seventh minute. Bentley was able to kill off the first half of the man-advantage with relative ease but just as the power play was winging down, Arlo Merritt took a tripping penalty to extend BC's advantage. Perreault hit the outside of the post off of the ensuing faceoff and then Bentley was able to just disrupt the Eagles structure enough to force a turnover, then an offsides and finally an icing. The Falcons seemed to take heart at the mistakes made by Boston College and the defense remained locked in, continually blocking shots and passes to kill off the entire stretch of BC power play. Afterwards, Bentley began to play defense almost as if they had the lead but the result was that BC had great difficulty getting through on the rush. Even so, a bad turnover in the Falcons end gave James Hagens a glorious look at the goal but he delayed too long and by the time he shot the puck one of the Falcons was able to get his stick in the way and deflect the puck out of play. Boston College kept trying to set up passing plays and Bentley continued to get sticks and bodies in the way. With about 5 minutes to go, Bentley was able to get some pressure on Fowler but the BC netminder matched his counterpart by stopping the multi-shot attempt. With snow building up around the ice, BC committed consecutive icings near the end of the period but were able to clear the puck after each faceoff. With under two minutes to play, BC was finally able to follow up a rush and, after forcing a turnover, James Hagens was able to grab a loose puck behind the net and wrap it around for the go ahead goal. Bentley called a timeout to get themselves set for the final 77 seconds. BC got possession of the puck and forced Bentley to play in their end for several seconds. After the Falcons second attempt at zone entry, Hasley was pulled and, a moment later, Ryan Leonard netted an empty-net goal to salt away the game.

== Rankings ==
=== USCHO ===
Team	Pre	1	2	3	4	5	6	7	8	9	10	11	13	14	15	16	17	18	19	20	21	22	23	24	25	Final
Air Force	NR	NR	NR	NR	NR	NR	NR	NR	NR	NR	NR	NR	NR	NR	NR	NR	NR	NR	NR	NR	NR	NR	NR	NR	NR	NR
American International	NR	NR	NR	NR	NR	NR	NR	NR	NR	NR	NR	NR	NR	NR	NR	NR	NR	NR	NR	NR	NR	NR	NR	NR	NR	NR
Army	NR	NR	NR	NR	NR	NR	NR	NR	NR	NR	NR	NR	NR	NR	NR	NR	NR	NR	NR	NR	NR	NR	NR	NR	NR	NR
Bentley	NR	NR	NR	NR	NR	NR	NR	NR	NR	NR	NR	NR	NR	NR	NR	NR	NR	NR	NR	NR	NR	NR	NR	NR	20	19
Canisius	NR	NR	NR	NR	NR	NR	NR	NR	NR	NR	NR	NR	NR	NR	NR	NR	NR	NR	NR	NR	NR	NR	NR	NR	NR	NR
Holy Cross	NR	NR	NR	NR	NR	NR	NR	NR	NR	NR	NR	NR	NR	NR	NR	NR	NR	NR	NR	NR	NR	20	NR	19	NR	NR
Mercyhurst	NR	NR	NR	NR	NR	NR	NR	NR	NR	NR	NR	NR	NR	NR	NR	NR	NR	NR	NR	NR	NR	NR	NR	NR	NR	NR
Niagara	NR	NR	NR	NR	NR	NR	NR	NR	NR	NR	NR	NR	NR	NR	NR	NR	NR	NR	NR	NR	NR	NR	NR	NR	NR	NR
RIT	NR	NR	NR	NR	NR	NR	NR	NR	NR	NR	NR	NR	NR	NR	NR	NR	NR	NR	NR	NR	NR	NR	NR	NR	NR	NR
Robert Morris	NR	NR	NR	NR	NR	NR	NR	NR	NR	NR	NR	NR	NR	NR	NR	NR	NR	NR	NR	NR	NR	NR	NR	NR	NR	NR
Sacred Heart	NR	NR	NR	NR	NR	NR	NR	NR	NR	NR	NR	NR	NR	NR	NR	NR	NR	NR	NR	NR	NR	NR	NR	NR	NR	NR

Note: USCHO did not release a poll in week 12 or 26.

=== USA Hockey ===
Team	Pre	1	2	3	4	5	6	7	8	9	10	11	13	14	15	16	17	18	19	20	21	22	23	24	25	26	Final
Air Force	NR	NR	NR	NR	NR	NR	NR	NR	NR	NR	NR	NR	NR	NR	NR	NR	NR	NR	NR	NR	NR	NR	NR	NR	NR	NR	NR
American International	NR	NR	NR	NR	NR	NR	NR	NR	NR	NR	NR	NR	NR	NR	NR	NR	NR	NR	NR	NR	NR	NR	NR	NR	NR	NR	NR
Army	NR	NR	NR	NR	NR	NR	NR	NR	NR	NR	NR	NR	NR	NR	NR	NR	NR	NR	NR	NR	NR	NR	NR	NR	NR	NR	NR
Bentley	NR	NR	NR	NR	NR	NR	NR	NR	NR	NR	NR	NR	NR	NR	NR	NR	NR	NR	NR	NR	NR	NR	NR	NR	20	20	20
Canisius	NR	NR	NR	NR	NR	NR	NR	NR	NR	NR	NR	NR	NR	NR	NR	NR	NR	NR	NR	NR	NR	NR	NR	NR	NR	NR	NR
Holy Cross	NR	NR	NR	NR	NR	NR	NR	NR	NR	NR	NR	NR	NR	NR	NR	NR	NR	NR	NR	NR	NR	20	NR	NR	NR	NR	NR
Mercyhurst	NR	NR	NR	NR	NR	NR	NR	NR	NR	NR	NR	NR	NR	NR	NR	NR	NR	NR	NR	NR	NR	NR	NR	NR	NR	NR	NR
Niagara	NR	NR	NR	NR	NR	NR	NR	NR	NR	NR	NR	NR	NR	NR	NR	NR	NR	NR	NR	NR	NR	NR	NR	NR	NR	NR	NR
RIT	NR	NR	NR	NR	NR	NR	NR	NR	NR	NR	NR	NR	NR	NR	NR	NR	NR	NR	NR	NR	NR	NR	NR	NR	NR	NR	NR
Robert Morris	NR	NR	NR	NR	NR	NR	NR	NR	NR	NR	NR	NR	NR	NR	NR	NR	NR	NR	NR	NR	NR	NR	NR	NR	NR	NR	NR
Sacred Heart	NR	NR	NR	NR	NR	NR	NR	NR	NR	NR	NR	NR	NR	NR	NR	NR	NR	NR	NR	NR	NR	NR	NR	NR	NR	NR	NR

Note: USA Hockey did not release a poll in week 12.

=== Pairwise ===
Team	1	2	3	4	5	6	7	8	9	10	11	13	14	15	16	17	18	19	20	21	22	23	24	Final
Air Force	23	36	48	43	43	42	38	42	47	45	48	48	43	48	47	50	53	51	52	52	50	47	47	49
American International	28	53	44	32	36	40	50	46	49	50	50	52	52	51	52	53	51	50	50	50	52	52	51	51
Army	20	20	18	30	49	56	46	50	56	55	58	58	60	59	56	51	51	52	50	50	50	47	47	47
Bentley	28	41	33	37	28	43	26	21	29	29	31	27	29	26	36	38	34	29	36	35	36	29	25	22
Canisius	11	50	58	54	46	54	54	54	55	55	58	58	59	57	59	59	57	58	57	56	54	55	56	56
Holy Cross	28	10	31	33	48	55	51	45	41	39	38	40	46	44	39	33	29	29	27	28	25	25	24	25
Mercyhurst	28	32	47	58	58	64	64	64	64	64	64	64	64	64	64	64	64	64	64	64	64	64	64	64
Niagara	28	26	46	18	21	30	35	32	46	49	51	51	45	49	47	48	47	48	47	48	47	49	51	51
RIT	2	21	34	49	53	58	58	57	60	62	62	62	62	62	62	63	62	62	61	59	59	59	59	59
Robert Morris	28	57	29	21	35	27	48	50	52	51	44	46	49	50	50	54	58	58	57	58	58	55	56	56
Sacred Heart	28	38	37	22	45	50	32	30	44	40	39	35	39	36	30	28	26	31	30	21	21	21	26	27

Note: teams ranked in the top-10 automatically qualify for the NCAA tournament. Teams ranked 11-16 can qualify based upon conference tournament results.

== Awards ==
=== NCAA ===
AHCA All-American Teams
East First Team	Position
Mac Gadowsky, Army	D
East Second Team	Position
Liam McLinskey, Holy Cross	F

=== Atlantic Hockey America ===
Award		Recipient
Player of the Year		Liam McLinskey, Holy Cross
Forward of the Year		Liam McLinskey, Holy Cross
Best Defenseman		Mac Gadowsky, Army
Goaltender of the Year		Thomas Gale, Holy Cross
Best Defensive Forward		Austin Schwartz, Air Force
Best Defensive Forward		Ethan Leyh, Bentley
Rookie of the Year		Trevor Hoskin, Niagara
Individual Sportsmanship Award		Mac Gadowsky, Army
Coach of the Year		Bill Riga, Holy Cross
Tournament Most Outstanding Player		Connor Hasley, Bentley
All-Atlantic Hockey America Teams
First Team	Position	Second Team
Thomas Gale, Holy Cross	G	Connor Hasley, Bentley
Nick Bochen, Bentley	D	Mikey Adamson, Sacred Heart
Mac Gadowsky, Army	D	Mack Oliphant, Holy Cross
Ethan Leyh, Bentley	F	Matteo Giampa, Canisius
Liam McLinskey, Holy Cross	F	Trevor Hoskin, Niagara
Matthew Wilde, RIT	F	Félix Trudeau, Sacred Heart
Third Team	Position	Rookie Team
Ajeet Gundarah, Sacred Heart	G	Ajeet Gundarah, Sacred Heart
Hunter Sansbury, Sacred Heart	D	Dominic Elliott, Robert Morris
Evan Stella, American International	D	Dominic Payne, Canisius
Jay Ahearn, Niagara	F	Trevor Hoskin, Niagara
Tyler Fukakusa, RIT	F	Jack Ivey, Army
Devin Phillips, Holy Cross	F	Matt Kursonis, Holy Cross
