= 2024–25 Holy Cross Crusaders men's ice hockey season =

Atlantic Hockey America, Champion
- Conference: 1st AHA
- Home ice: Hart Center

Rankings
- USCHO: NR
- USA Hockey: NR

Record
- Overall: 24–14–2
- Conference: 19–5–2
- Home: 15–7–1
- Road: 9–5–1
- Neutral: 0–2–0

Coaches and captains
- Head coach: Bill Riga
- Assistant coaches: Castan Sommer; Drew Michals; Connor Mauro
- Captain: Matt Shatsky
- Alternate captain(s): John Gelatt; Liam McLinskey; Devin Phillips

The 2024–25 Holy Cross Crusaders men's ice hockey season was the 59th season of play for the program, the 27th at the Division I level and the 1st in Atlantic Hockey America. The Crusaders represented the College of the Holy Cross, played their home games at the Hart Center and were coached by Bill Riga in his 4th season.

== Season ==
At the start of the season, Holy Cross had difficulty getting their offense in gear. Despite being led by All-American, Liam McLinskey, the Crusaders were wildly inconsistent in finding the back of the net. Evan with Thomas Gale giving the team a solid performance in goal, the club wasted several opportunities for wins in the first month and a half and found themselves under water around Thanksgiving. However, in the latter part of November the Crusaders began to find their game and finally were able to string a few good games together. A four game streak allowed the team to head into the winter break with a .500 record and decent chance at a conference title.

Holy Cross kicked off the second half of its season by losing three in a row. On a positive note, because all of those matches were against non-conference opponents, it did harm their chances at a league championship. On the other hand, it dropped the team record to 1–7 outside Atlantic Hockey America and left little chance for Holy Cross to earn an at-large bid. Knowing that their only shot at the tournament came with a tournament victory, Holy Cross raised their effort in the second half and went on a tear through league play. The Crusaders went undefeated over a 12-game span and were scoring in bunches, completely bowling over their opponents in many of those matches. Not only was the defense limiting the opposition to less than 2 goals on average but the offense was filling the net with an avalanche of pucks. McLinskey, led the team with 25 points in that stretch and was aided by much improved play by linemates Devin Phillips and Jack Stockfish. The extended winning streak placed the team atop the standings and kept them there until the end of the regular season, giving Holy Cross its first conference title in 19 years.

As the top-seeded team, Holy Cross received a bye into the quarterfinal round and began its postseason against a seemingly disheartened American International club. With the final conference games being played between the two, AIC pulled off a stunning upset in the first game when they built a 3-goal lead and were able to hold off the Crusaders despite being outshot 36–19. Emboldened by their victory, the Yellow Jackets overcame an early Holy Cross lead to tie the match in the second. Gale faced a barrage of shots in the middle frame and held his net to stop American International from pulling into the lead. The Crusaders finally woke up in the third and took over the match, controlling the puck for long stretched before Stockfish was able to score the winning goal with less than 4 minutes to play and send the series to a deciding third game. Special teams played a critical role in the final contest with both sides scoring two power play markers and Holy Cross adding another on the penalty kill. Despite a heavy shot advantage again, the Crusaders were unable to get the winning tally in regulation and the match headed into overtime. The extra session wasn't even a minutes old when McLinskey found Michael Abgrall streaking into the offensive zone and the junior forward found the top corner of the net to send Holy Cross into the semifinals.

The next round saw a surprisingly strong performance from Army that pushed Holy Cross to the brink. Gale was again called upon to save the Crusaders and make 44 saves is regulation just to allow the teams to head into overtime. This time it took Holy Cross just over 3 minutes to find the winning goal when Phillips found the twine. The win buoyed Holy Cross and the team came out firing in game two; the Crusaders scored the first four goals of the match, and built an unassailable lead that was capped off by an empty-netter from McLinskey. The senior forward had three points in the game and became just the second Crusader to score 50 points in a season at the Division I level.

For the league championship, Holy Cross faced off against Bentley and used the teams strong power play to build a 2-goal edge in the first period. The Falcons responded by attacking the Holy Cross net in the second but, unline the previous games, Gale was unable to stem the tide. Bentley scored three goals in the middle period and the Crusaders suddenly found themselves trailing. A third power play tally in the final period tied the game which had the side effect of McLinskey tying the single-season program record for points with 54, but the defense collapsed under the weight of the Falcons attack. Holy Cross allowed 3 more goals in the final 11 minutes to see a golden opportunity at a tournament appearance vanish before their eyes.

== Departures ==
| Player | Position | Nationality | Cause |
|---|---|---|---|
| Alec Cicero | Forward | United States | Graduate transfer to Canisius |
| Tyler Ghirardosi | Forward | Canada | Graduate transfer to Sacred Heart |
| Jason Grande | Goaltender | United States | Graduation (signed with Springfield Thunderbirds) |
| Matthew Guerra | Forward | United States | Graduate transfer to Sacred Heart |
| Jake Higgins | Defenseman | United States | Graduate transfer to Northeastern |
| Jack Ricketts | Forward | United States | Graduate transfer to Quinnipiac |
| Jack Robilotti | Defenseman | United States | Graduate transfer to Massachusetts Lowell |
| Charlie Spence | Defenseman | United States | Left program (retired) |
| Lucas Thorne | Forward | Canada | Graduation (retired) |

== Recruiting ==
| Player | Position | Nationality | Age | Notes |
|---|---|---|---|---|
| Michael Abgrall | Forward | Canada | 20 | Richmond, BC; transfer from Omaha |
| Ryan Buckley | Defenseman | United States | 20 | Warwick, RI |
| Anthony Carone | Forward | United States | 21 | Pittsburgh, PA |
| Lachlan Getz | Defenseman | United States | 22 | Northfield, IL; transfer from Michigan Tech |
| Timothy Heinke | Forward | United States | 22 | Kensington, CT; transfer from Quinnipiac |
| Owen Kim | Forward | Canada | 20 | North Vancouver, BC |
| Malachi Klassen | Goaltender | Canada | 21 | Winkler, MB |
| Matt Kursonis | Forward | United States | 20 | Worcester, MA |
| Ben LeFranc | Defenseman | Canada | 21 | Penticton, BC |
| Edward Moskowitz | Forward | Canada | 21 | Toronto, ON |
| Jarrod Smith | Forward | Canada | 20 | West Vancouver, BC |

== Roster ==
As of August 12, 2024.

| No. | Nat. | Player | Class | Pos | Height | Weight | DoB | Hometown | Previous team | NHL rights |
|---|---|---|---|---|---|---|---|---|---|---|
| 1 | (United States) | Louden Hogg | Junior | G | 5' 11" (1.8 m) | 160 lb (73 kg) | 2002-10-18 | Cheyenne, Wyoming | Fargo Force (USHL) | — |
| 2 | (United States) | Lachlan Getz | Junior | D | 6' 3" (1.91 m) | 190 lb (86 kg) | 2002-02-01 | Northfield, Illinois | Michigan Tech (CCHA) | — |
| 3 | (Canada) | Brody Gagno | Sophomore | D | 6' 1" (1.85 m) | 190 lb (86 kg) | 2002-07-29 | South Surrey, British Columbia | Surrey Eagles (BCHL) | — |
| 5 | (United States) | Will Troutwine | Sophomore | D | 6' 3" (1.91 m) | 215 lb (98 kg) | 2002-06-23 | Eveleth, Minnesota | Janesville Jets (NAHL) | — |
| 6 | (United States) | Timothy Heinke | Junior | F | 6' 1" (1.85 m) | 194 lb (88 kg) | 2001-10-02 | Kensington, Connecticut | Quinnipiac (ECAC) | — |
| 7 | (United States) | Anthony Carone | Freshman | F | 6' 1" (1.85 m) | 183 lb (83 kg) | 2003-07-30 | Pittsburgh, Pennsylvania | Victoria Grizzlies (BCHL) | — |
| 8 | (United States) | Ryan Buckley | Junior | D | 6' 1" (1.85 m) | 179 lb (81 kg) | 2004-01-06 | Warwick, Rhode Island | Alberni Valley Bulldogs (BCHL) | — |
| 10 | (United States) | Liam McLinskey (A) | Senior | F | 6' 3" (1.91 m) | 165 lb (75 kg) | 2001-02-20 | Pearl River, New York | Quinnipiac (ECAC) | — |
| 11 | (Canada) | Michael Abgrall | Junior | F | 5' 11" (1.8 m) | 172 lb (78 kg) | 2003-10-25 | Richmond, British Columbia | Omaha (NCHC) | — |
| 12 | (United States) | Matt Kursonis | Freshman | F | 6' 1" (1.85 m) | 187 lb (85 kg) | 2004-03-05 | Worcester, Massachusetts | Alberni Valley Bulldogs (BCHL) | — |
| 13 | (United States) | Will Elias | Sophomore | D | 6' 0" (1.83 m) | 180 lb (82 kg) | 2003-01-28 | Weston, Massachusetts | Cowichan Valley Capitals (BCHL) | — |
| 14 | (Canada) | Matt Shatsky (C) | Senior | D | 6' 0" (1.83 m) | 180 lb (82 kg) | 2001-04-29 | Winnipeg, Manitoba | Sherwood Park Crusaders (AJHL) | — |
| 15 | (Canada) | Jarrod Smith | Freshman | F | 5' 10" (1.78 m) | 165 lb (75 kg) | 2004-01-22 | West Vancouver, British Columbia | Cranbrook Bucks (BCHL) | — |
| 17 | (United States) | Matt DeBoer | Junior | F | 6' 0" (1.83 m) | 185 lb (84 kg) | 2002-09-02 | Las Vegas, Nevada | Green Bay Gamblers (USHL) | — |
| 18 | (Canada) | Ty Gagno | Sophomore | F | 6' 2" (1.88 m) | 185 lb (84 kg) | 2003-10-01 | Langley, British Columbia | Prince George Spruce Kings (BCHL) | — |
| 19 | (Canada) | Jack Stockfish | Sophomore | F | 6' 4" (1.93 m) | 215 lb (98 kg) | 2002-09-30 | North Bay, Ontario | Prince George Spruce Kings (BCHL) | — |
| 20 | (United States) | Devin Phillips (A) | Junior | F | 5' 9" (1.75 m) | 170 lb (77 kg) | 2001-07-12 | Raleigh, North Carolina | Brooks Bandits (AJHL) | — |
| 21 | (Canada) | Owen Kim | Freshman | F | 5' 8" (1.73 m) | 161 lb (73 kg) | 2004-05-02 | North Vancouver, British Columbia | Vernon Vipers (BCHL) | — |
| 22 | (Canada) | Edward Moskowitz | Freshman | F | 5' 10" (1.78 m) | 170 lb (77 kg) | 2003-05-29 | Toronto, Ontario | Blackfalds Bulldogs (BCHL) | — |
| 23 | (Canada) | Ben LeFranc | Freshman | F | 5' 9" (1.75 m) | 176 lb (80 kg) | 2003-08-14 | Penticton, British Columbia | Prince George Spruce Kings (BCHL) | — |
| 24 | (United States) | John Gelatt (A) | Senior | F | 5' 11" (1.8 m) | 195 lb (88 kg) | 2001-04-29 | Middletown, New Jersey | Johnstown Tomahawks (NAHL) | — |
| 27 | (United States) | Mack Oliphant | Junior | D | 6' 3" (1.91 m) | 195 lb (88 kg) | 2002-12-28 | Northbrook, Illinois | Johnstown Tomahawks (NAHL) | — |
| 28 | (Canada) | Jack Seymour | Junior | F | 5' 11" (1.8 m) | 160 lb (73 kg) | 2001-04-06 | Chelsea, Quebec | Chilliwack Chiefs (BCHL) | — |
| 29 | (United States) | Conner Welsh | Sophomore | F | 5' 11" (1.8 m) | 175 lb (79 kg) | 2004-01-02 | Greenwich, Connecticut | Vernon Vipers (BCHL) | — |
| 31 | (Canada) | Malachi Klassen | Freshman | G | 6' 3" (1.91 m) | 200 lb (91 kg) | 2003-09-09 | Winkler, Manitoba | Winkler Flyers (MJHL) | — |
| 33 | (Canada) | Thomas Gale | Senior | G | 6' 1" (1.85 m) | 180 lb (82 kg) | 2000-06-10 | Kirkland, Quebec | P.A.L. Jr. Islanders (NCDC) | — |
| 34 | (United States) | Joe Solimine | Junior | F | 5' 8" (1.73 m) | 165 lb (75 kg) | 2002-03-03 | Middleton, Massachusetts | Boston Junior Bruins (NCDC) | — |
| 37 | (United States) | Nic Petruolo | Senior (RS) | D | 6' 2" (1.88 m) | 195 lb (88 kg) | 2000-01-29 | Neshanic Station, New Jersey | Union (ECAC) | — |
| 40 | (Canada) | Michael Hodge | Senior | F | 5' 8" (1.73 m) | 157 lb (71 kg) | 2000-05-30 | Calgary, Alberta | Union (ECAC) | — |

== Standings ==
2024–25 Atlantic Hockey America Standings
| | Conference record | | | | | | | | | | Overall record | | | | | |
| | GP | W | L | T | OW | OL | SW | PTS | GF | GA | GP | W | L | T | GF | GA |
|---|---|---|---|---|---|---|---|---|---|---|---|---|---|---|---|---|
| Holy Cross † | 26 | 19 | 5 | 2 | 4 | 0 | 1 | 56 | 92 | 47 | 40 | 24 | 14 | 2 | 130 | 94 |
| Sacred Heart | 26 | 16 | 7 | 3 | 1 | 1 | 2 | 53 | 80 | 64 | 39 | 21 | 13 | 5 | 118 | 101 |
| #19 Bentley * | 26 | 16 | 9 | 1 | 1 | 2 | 1 | 51 | 79 | 57 | 40 | 23 | 15 | 2 | 115 | 83 |
| Niagara | 26 | 15 | 9 | 2 | 3 | 3 | 1 | 48 | 90 | 70 | 37 | 18 | 16 | 3 | 124 | 109 |
| Army | 26 | 14 | 10 | 2 | 2 | 0 | 2 | 44 | 84 | 74 | 38 | 16 | 20 | 2 | 105 | 117 |
| Canisius | 26 | 11 | 13 | 2 | 0 | 3 | 0 | 38 | 84 | 79 | 37 | 12 | 23 | 2 | 98 | 120 |
| Air Force | 26 | 11 | 13 | 2 | 2 | 3 | 1 | 37 | 59 | 58 | 40 | 16 | 21 | 3 | 86 | 112 |
| American International | 26 | 9 | 16 | 1 | 0 | 3 | 0 | 31 | 63 | 77 | 38 | 13 | 23 | 2 | 92 | 117 |
| RIT | 26 | 9 | 15 | 2 | 2 | 0 | 1 | 28 | 65 | 102 | 35 | 10 | 23 | 2 | 82 | 133 |
| Robert Morris | 26 | 7 | 15 | 4 | 1 | 2 | 1 | 27 | 72 | 86 | 35 | 10 | 20 | 5 | 95 | 115 |
| Mercyhurst | 26 | 4 | 19 | 3 | 1 | 0 | 2 | 16 | 59 | 113 | 35 | 4 | 27 | 4 | 77 | 150 |
Championship: March 22, 2025 † indicates conference regular season champion (DeGregorio Trophy) * indicates conference tournament champion (Riley Trophy); Rankings: USCHO.com Top 20 Poll

== Schedule and results ==
| Date | Time | Opponent^{#} | Rank^{#} | Site | TV | Decision | Result | Attendance | Record |
Regular Season
| October 5 | 7:00 pm | at #3 Boston University* | | Agganis Arena • Boston, Massachusetts | ESPN+ | Gale | L 2–5 | 6,150 | 0–1–0 |
| October 11 | 7:00 pm | Connecticut* | | Hart Center • Worcester, Massachusetts | FloHockey | Gale | W 4–3 | 1,063 | 1–1–0 |
| October 12 | 3:30 pm | at Connecticut* | | Toscano Family Ice Forum • Storrs, Connecticut | ESPN+ | Gale | L 1–3 | 2,584 | 1–2–0 |
| October 19 | 7:00 pm | Army | | Hart Center • Worcester, Massachusetts | FloHockey | Gale | L 0–1 | 692 | 1–3–0 (0–1–0) |
| October 20 | 5:00 pm | Army | | Hart Center • Worcester, Massachusetts | FloHockey | Gale | W 5–3 | 809 | 2–3–0 (1–1–0) |
| October 25 | 7:00 pm | at Sacred Heart | | Martire Family Arena • Fairfield, Connecticut | FloHockey | Gale | W 2–1 ^{OT} | 2,579 | 3–3–0 (2–1–0) |
| October 26 | 7:00 pm | at Sacred Heart | | Martire Family Arena • Fairfield, Connecticut | FloHockey | Gale | L 1–2 | 2,448 | 3–4–0 (2–2–0) |
| November 1 | 7:00 pm | #20 Massachusetts Lowell* | | Hart Center • Worcester, Massachusetts | FloHockey, NESN | Gale | L 4–5 ^{OT} | 1,002 | 3–5–0 |
| November 2 | 7:00 pm | #14 Quinnipiac* | | Hart Center • Worcester, Massachusetts | FloHockey, NESN | Gale | L 0–3 | 2,100 | 3–6–0 |
| November 7 | 7:00 pm | American International | | Hart Center • Worcester, Massachusetts | FloHockey | Gale | W 5–2 | 661 | 4–6–0 (3–2–0) |
| November 8 | 7:00 pm | American International | | Hart Center • Worcester, Massachusetts | FloHockey, NESN+ | Gale | L 2–3 | 814 | 4–7–0 (3–3–0) |
| November 15 | 7:00 pm | at Niagara | | Dwyer Arena • Lewiston, New York | FloHockey | Gale | T 3–3 ^{SOL} | 672 | 4–7–1 (3–3–1) |
| November 16 | 5:00 pm | at Niagara | | Dwyer Arena • Lewiston, New York | FloHockey | Gale | L 2–3 | 656 | 4–8–1 (3–4–1) |
| November 22 | 7:00 pm | at Army | | Tate Rink • West Point, New York | FloHockey | Gale | W 5–3 | 2,080 | 5–8–1 (4–4–1) |
| November 29 | 7:00 pm | Sacred Heart | | Hart Center • Worcester, Massachusetts | FloHockey | Gale | W 6–1 | 771 | 6–8–1 (5–4–1) |
| November 30 | 7:00 pm | Sacred Heart | | Hart Center • Worcester, Massachusetts | FloHockey, NESN+ | Gale | W 4–1 | 922 | 7–8–1 (6–4–1) |
| December 6 | 1:00 pm | at American International | | MassMutual Center • Springfield, Massachusetts | FloHockey | Gale | W 1–0 ^{OT} | 362 | 8–8–1 (7–4–1) |
| December 31 | 2:00 pm | at Long Island* | | Northwell Health Ice Center • East Meadow, New York | ESPN+ | Gale | L 1–3 | 381 | 8–9–1 |
Coachella Valley Cactus Cup
| January 3 | 6:30 pm | vs. Omaha* | | Acrisure Arena • Thousand Palms, California (Cactus Cup Semifinal) | | Gale | L 3–4 | — | 8–10–1 |
| January 4 | 6:30 pm | vs. Michigan Tech* | | Acrisure Arena • Thousand Palms, California (Cactus Cup Consolation Game) | | Hogg | L 3–4 ^{OT} | — | 8–11–1 |
| January 10 | 7:00 pm | Robert Morris | | Hart Center • Worcester, Massachusetts | FloHockey | Gale | W 4–1 ^{OT} | 640 | 9–11–1 (8–4–1) |
| January 11 | 6:00 pm | Robert Morris | | Hart Center • Worcester, Massachusetts | FloHockey | Gale | T 2–2 ^{SOL} | 680 | 9–11–2 (8–4–2) |
| January 17 | 7:00 pm | at Bentley | | Bentley Arena • Waltham, Massachusetts | FloHockey | Gale | W 3–2 ^{OT} | 1,580 | 10–11–2 (9–4–2) |
| January 18 | 6:00 pm | at Bentley | | Bentley Arena • Waltham, Massachusetts | FloHockey | Gale | W 5–1 | 1,522 | 11–11–2 (10–4–2) |
| January 24 | 9:05 pm | at Air Force | | Cadet Ice Arena • Colorado Springs, Colorado | FloHockey, Altitude 2 | Gale | W 3–2 | 2,246 | 12–11–2 (11–4–2) |
| January 25 | 7:05 pm | at Air Force | | Cadet Ice Arena • Colorado Springs, Colorado | FloHockey, Altitude 2 | Gale | W 6–3 | 2,575 | 13–11–2 (12–4–2) |
| February 1 | 7:30 pm | Canisius | | Hart Center • Worcester, Massachusetts | FloHockey | Gale | W 3–2 ^{OT} | 1,372 | 14–11–2 (13–4–2) |
| February 2 | 3:00 pm | Canisius | | Hart Center • Worcester, Massachusetts | FloHockey, NESN | Gale | W 4–1 | 953 | 15–11–2 (14–4–2) |
| February 7 | 7:00 pm | at RIT | | Gene Polisseni Center • Henrietta, New York | FloHockey | Gale | W 9–2 | 2,615 | 16–11–2 (15–4–2) |
| February 8 | 5:00 pm | at RIT | | Gene Polisseni Center • Henrietta, New York | FloHockey | Gale | W 3–0 | 3,162 | 17–11–2 (16–4–2) |
| February 13 | 6:00 pm | Mercyhurst | | Hart Center • Worcester, Massachusetts | FloHockey, NESN+ | Gale | W 4–1 | 693 | 18–11–2 (17–4–2) |
| February 14 | 6:00 pm | Mercyhurst | | Hart Center • Worcester, Massachusetts | FloHockey | Gale | W 7–3 | 742 | 19–11–2 (18–4–2) |
| February 20 | 7:00 pm | Bentley | | Hart Center • Worcester, Massachusetts | FloHockey | Gale | L 0–3 | 1,655 | 19–12–2 (18–5–2) |
| February 24 | 7:00 pm | American International | | Hart Center • Worcester, Massachusetts | FloHockey | Gale | W 3–1 | 826 | 20–12–2 (19–5–2) |
Atlantic Hockey America Tournament
| March 7 | 7:00 pm | American International* | #20т | Hart Center • Worcester, Massachusetts (AHA Quarterfinal Game 1) | FloHockey | Gale | L 2–3 | 614 | 20–13–2 |
| March 8 | 7:00 pm | American International* | #20т | Hart Center • Worcester, Massachusetts (AHA Quarterfinal Game 2) | FloHockey | Gale | W 3–2 | 678 | 21–13–2 |
| March 9 | 5:00 pm | American International* | #20т | Hart Center • Worcester, Massachusetts (AHA Quarterfinal Game 3) | FloHockey | Gale | W 4–3 ^{OT} | 852 | 22–13–2 |
| March 14 | 7:00 pm | Army* | | Hart Center • Worcester, Massachusetts (AHA Semifinal Game 1) | FloHockey | Gale | W 3–2 ^{OT} | 2,157 | 23–13–2 |
| March 15 | 7:00 pm | Army* | | Hart Center • Worcester, Massachusetts (AHA Semifinal Game 2) | FloHockey | Gale | W 5–1 | 1,341 | 24–13–2 |
| March 22 | 7:00 pm | Bentley* | #19 | Hart Center • Worcester, Massachusetts (AHA Championship) | FloHockey | Gale | L 3–6 | 2,717 | 24–14–2 |
*Non-conference game. ^{#}Rankings from USCHO.com Poll. All times are in Eastern Time. Source:

== Scoring statistics ==
| Name | Position | Games | Goals | Assists | Points | PIM |
|---|---|---|---|---|---|---|
| Liam McLinskey | F | 40 | 24 | 30 | 54 | 18 |
| Devin Phillips | F | 34 | 11 | 20 | 31 | 6 |
| Matt DeBoer | W | 40 | 11 | 20 | 31 | 46 |
| Mack Oliphant | D | 36 | 3 | 26 | 29 | 4 |
| Jack Stockfish | C | 36 | 15 | 12 | 27 | 30 |
| Matt Kursonis | C/LW | 27 | 10 | 15 | 25 | 14 |
| Michael Abgrall | C | 40 | 8 | 17 | 25 | 56 |
| Timothy Heinke | RW | 39 | 12 | 7 | 19 | 24 |
| Jack Seymour | RW | 34 | 7 | 12 | 19 | 34 |
| John Gelatt | F | 37 | 7 | 10 | 17 | 10 |
| Ty Gagno | F | 33 | 4 | 9 | 13 | 26 |
| Will Elias | D | 32 | 5 | 7 | 12 | 16 |
| Matt Shatsky | D | 28 | 1 | 8 | 9 | 8 |
| Nic Petruolo | D | 27 | 1 | 7 | 8 | 54 |
| Brody Gagno | D | 39 | 1 | 7 | 8 | 40 |
| Lachlan Getz | D | 38 | 0 | 8 | 8 | 32 |
| Owen Kim | F | 26 | 3 | 4 | 7 | 39 |
| Joe Solimine | C | 32 | 1 | 5 | 6 | 12 |
| Michael Hodge | F | 25 | 3 | 1 | 4 | 2 |
| William Troutwine | D | 31 | 2 | 2 | 4 | 0 |
| Connor Welsh | F | 33 | 0 | 3 | 3 | 8 |
| Ben LeFranc | D | 22 | 1 | 0 | 1 | 2 |
| Edward Moskowitz | LW | 7 | 0 | 1 | 1 | 0 |
| Ryan Buckley | D | 14 | 0 | 1 | 1 | 4 |
| Jarrod Smith | F | 14 | 0 | 1 | 1 | 8 |
| Louden Hogg | G | 1 | 0 | 0 | 0 | 10 |
| Malachi Klassen | G | 1 | 0 | 0 | 0 | 10 |
| Thomas Gale | G | 39 | 0 | 0 | 0 | 0 |
| Bench | – | – | – | – | – | 10 |
| Total | | | 130 | 233 | 363 | 503 |

== Goaltending statistics ==
| Name | Games | Minutes | Wins | Losses | Ties | Goals against | Saves | Shut outs | SV % | GAA |
|---|---|---|---|---|---|---|---|---|---|---|
| Thomas Gale | 39 | 2324:39 | 24 | 13 | 2 | 83 | 1056 | 2 | .927 | 2.14 |
| Malachi Klassen | 1 | 19:45 | 0 | 0 | 0 | 1 | 0 | 0 | .000 | 3.04 |
| Louden Hogg | 1 | 60:33 | 0 | 1 | 0 | 4 | 18 | 0 | .818 | 3.96 |
| Empty Net | - | 21:40 | - | - | - | 6 | - | - | - | - |
| Total | 40 | 2426:37 | 24 | 14 | 2 | 94 | 1074 | 2 | .920 | 2.32 |

== Rankings ==
| Poll | Week | | | | | | | | | | | | | | | | | | | | | | | | | | | |
| Poll | Pre | 1 | 2 | 3 | 4 | 5 | 6 | 7 | 8 | 9 | 10 | 11 | 12 | 13 | 14 | 15 | 16 | 17 | 18 | 19 | 20 | 21 | 22 | 23 | 24 | 25 | 26 | 27 (Final) |
|---|---|---|---|---|---|---|---|---|---|---|---|---|---|---|---|---|---|---|---|---|---|---|---|---|---|---|---|---|
| USCHO.com | NR | NR | NR | NR | NR | NR | NR | NR | NR | NR | NR | NR | - | NR | NR | NR | NR | NR | NR | NR | NR | RV | 20т | RV | 19 | RV | - | RV |
| USA Hockey | NR | NR | NR | NR | NR | NR | NR | NR | NR | NR | NR | NR | - | NR | NR | NR | NR | NR | NR | NR | NR | RV | 20 | RV | RV | RV | RV | RV |

Note: USCHO did not release a poll in week 12 or 26.
Note: USA Hockey did not release a poll in week 12.

== Awards and honors ==
| Player | Award | Ref |
|---|---|---|
| Liam McLinskey | AHCA All-American East Second Team | |
| Liam McLinskey | Atlantic Hockey America Player of the Year | |
| Liam McLinskey | Atlantic Hockey America Forward of the Year | |
| Thomas Gale | Atlantic Hockey America Goaltender of the Year | |
| Bill Riga | Atlantic Hockey America Coach of the Year | |
| Thomas Gale | All-Atlantic Hockey America First Team | |
| Liam McLinskey | All-Atlantic Hockey America First Team | |
| Mack Oliphant | All-Atlantic Hockey America Second Team | |
| Devin Phillips | All-Atlantic Hockey America Third Team | |
| Matt Kursonis | Atlantic Hockey America All-Rookie Team | |
| Liam McLinskey | Atlantic Hockey America All-Tournament Team | |
