= 2024–25 Bentley Falcons men's ice hockey season =

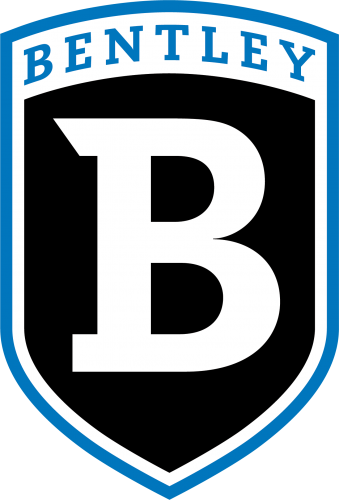

AHA Tournament, Champion NCAA Tournament, Regional Semifinal
- Conference: 3rd AHA
- Home ice: Bentley Arena

Rankings
- USCHO: #19
- USA Hockey: #20

Record
- Overall: 23–15–2
- Conference: 16–9–1
- Home: 13–5–1
- Road: 9–9–1
- Neutral: 1–1–0

Coaches and captains
- Head coach: Andy Jones
- Assistant coaches: Tom Fiorentino; Riley Colvard
- Captain: Ethan Leyh
- Alternate captain(s): Stephen Castagna; Tucker Hodgson

The 2024–25 Bentley Falcons men's ice hockey season was the 48th season of play for the program, the 26th at the Division I level and the 1st in Atlantic Hockey America. The Falcons represented Bentley University, played their home games at the Bentley Arena in Waltham, Massachusetts and were coached by Andy Jones in his 2nd season.

== Season ==
Bentley entered the season with few expectations, at least no more than they had in any previous campaign. Being selected to finish in the middle of the AHA standings, the team began the season with Connor Hasley starting in goal. The junior netminder had shared the crease the previous season but, with Nicholas Grabko having transferred, Hasley had first dibs on the crease. Early in the season, he didn't look like the answer between the pipes as Bentley went winless in their first three games. Max Beckford then began to alternate with Hasley before the upperclassman got into his stride and control of the starting job by the beginning of November.

The early part of the season was also a trying time for several skaters on the Falcons as a bevy of graduate players got off to slow starts as well. However, the team seemed to have gotten their skating legs by the second month of the season. After a poor start, Bentley went 7–1 in November with Hasley posting 4 shutouts to push the Falcons to the top of the conference standings and put them into a position to earn their first regular season title since their division III days. Up front, team captain Ethan Leyh was leading the charge with the 6th-year player scoring in all but one game during that stretch.

After returning from the winter break, Bentley kicked off the second half of their season with a win over #4 Maine, a fairly stunning victory for an Atlantic Hockey program, and were able to climb up into the top half of the PairWise rankings at the beginning of January. However, due to poor non-conference record of both Bentley and Atlantic Hockey, the Falcons would have to play almost perfect hockey to earn their way into an at-large position. Any hope for that was soon extinguished as the Falcons went on a skid during the first month of the year. After going 2–6, the team had fallen down the standings and nearly were back to a .500 record overall. While Hasley's performance had declined a bit during the skid, it was primarily the lack of offense that plagued the team. Bentley scored more than 2 goals in just one game and were held to 1 goal or fewer on five occasions.

The beginning of February saw the team begin anew with the offense finding its scoring touch once more. The team went 5–2 down the stretch and ended up finishing 3rd in the standings. Hasley added three more shutouts to his total to set a new program record not only for a season but for a career (Simon St. Pierre held the previous record with 6 career shutouts for the Falcons). Bentley entered the postseason with more wins than had been able to collect in the previous decade but they would still have to overcome a long history of playoff failures. Only once since they joined Division I in 1999 had Bentley been able to win more than one round in a single playoff and that had happened nearly 20 years earlier.

However, from the start of their postseason run, the Falcons looked like a team on a mission. After sitting for a week thanks to their quarterfinal bye, Hasley was absolutely dialed-in against Canisius, stopping all 51 shots he faced to send the Falcons to their first semifinal appearance in 16 years. Sacred Heart was finally able to break through and end Hasley's streak but the offense surged in the second half and scored the final 5 goals of the game. Hasley then reverted to his brick-wall form, blanking the Pioneers for his 11th of the season, putting him just 1 shy of the all-time NCAA record.

The championship game pitted Bentley against Holy Cross. Hasley was unable to stop all-American Liam McLinskey from putting his team up by 2 goals thanks to two power play markers but the Falcons' offense came to the rescue once more, scoring six goals in the final 40 minutes. Leyh and Nik Armstrong-Kingkade finished the game with three points each to lead Bentley to their first conference championship since 1981 and their first ever NCAA tournament appearance.

The reward for Bentley's best season was to face the #1 team in the nation, Boston College, in the opening round of the tournament. Despite the sizable disparity in apparent raw talent, Bentley was able to control long stretches of the game. Though they surrendered the opening goal at the end of the first period, Leyh was able to tie the game early in the second on the man-advantage. The Falcons were able to hold off the Eagles' attack and kept themselves within 1 shot of a lead for over half the match. BC was then able to solve Bentley's stout defensive effort and scored two goals (one into an empty net) in the final 80 seconds.

== Departures ==
Player	Position	Nationality	Cause
Jonathan Bendorf	Forward	United States	Graduation (signed with Reading Royals)
Cooper Connell	Forward	United States	Transferred to club team
Nicholas Grabko	Goaltender	United States	Graduate transfer to Alaska
Ethan Harrison	Forward	United States	Graduation (retired)
Josh Latta	Forward	Canada	Graduation (retired)
Danny Pearson	Forward	Canada	Left program (retired)
Joshua Seeley	Goaltender	United States	Transferred to Skidmore
Matt Thomson	Forward	United States	Graduation (retired)

== Recruiting ==
Player	Position	Nationality	Age	Notes
Oskar Kind Bakkevig	Forward	Norway	20	Oslo, NOR
Max Beckford	Goaltender	Canada	21	London, ON
Nicholas Bevilacqua	Goaltender	United States	21	Abington, MA
Jake Black	Forward	United States	22	Pomfret, CT; transfer from Connecticut
Artem Buzoberya	Forward	Ukraine	25	Kharkov, UKR; graduate transfer from Hobart
David Helledy	Defenseman	United States	21	Milwaukee, WI
Oliver Salo	Forward	Finland	21	Kaarina, FIN

== Roster ==
As of August 4, 2024

No.	Nat.	Player	Class	Pos	Height	Weight	DoB	Hometown	Previous team	NHL rights
2	(United States)	David Helledy	Freshman	D	6' 0" (1.83 m)	181 lb (82 kg)	2003-05-04	Milwaukee, Wisconsin	Maine Nordiques (NAHL)	—
4	(United States)	Sam Duerr	Senior	D	6' 1" (1.85 m)	190 lb (86 kg)	2002-03-22	Chicago, Illinois	Maine (HEA)	—
5	(Canada)	Nick Bochen	Graduate	D	5' 9" (1.75 m)	170 lb (77 kg)	2001-08-29	North Vancouver, British Columbia	Quinnipiac (ECAC)	—
6	(Canada)	Seth Bernard-Docker	Junior	D	6' 0" (1.83 m)	190 lb (86 kg)	2001-10-30	Canmore, Alberta	Sioux Falls Stampede (USHL)	—
8	(Finland)	Oliver Salo	Freshman	F	6' 1" (1.85 m)	190 lb (86 kg)	2003-07-09	Kaarina, Finland	Anchorage Wolverines (NAHL)	—
9	(United States)	Jake Black	Junior	D	5' 11" (1.8 m)	180 lb (82 kg)	2002-03-05	Pomfret, Connecticut	Connecticut (HEA)	—
10	(United States)	Jimmy Doyle	Sophomore	F	6' 2" (1.88 m)	190 lb (86 kg)	2002-04-02	Plainfield, Illinois	Janesville Jets (NAHL)	—
11	(Canada)	Ryan Mansfield	Sophomore	F	5' 11" (1.8 m)	195 lb (88 kg)	2002-12-22	Burlington, Ontario	Odessa Jackalopes (NAHL)	—
12	(Ukraine)	Artem Buzoverya	Graduate	F	6' 4" (1.93 m)	220 lb (100 kg)	1999-09-12	Kharkov, Ukraine	Hobart (NEHC)	—
13	(United States)	Peter Kramer	Sophomore	F	5' 11" (1.8 m)	185 lb (84 kg)	2002-08-08	Bridgewater, Massachusetts	Green Bay Gamblers (USHL)	—
14	(United States)	Pat Lawn	Junior	D	6' 0" (1.83 m)	175 lb (79 kg)	2001-03-26	Waltham, Massachusetts	West Kelowna Warriors (BCHL)	—
15	(Norway)	Oskar Kind Bakkevig	Freshman	F	5' 11" (1.8 m)	183 lb (83 kg)	2004-07-24	Oslo, Norway	Malmö Redhawks J20 (J20 Nationell)	—
16	(Canada)	Kellan Hjartarson	Sophomore	F	5' 11" (1.8 m)	175 lb (79 kg)	2003-02-23	Calgary, Alberta	Cranbrook Bucks (BCHL)	—
17	(Canada)	Stephen Castagna (A)	Junior	F	5' 9" (1.75 m)	170 lb (77 kg)	2001-08-06	North Vancouver, British Columbia	Alberni Valley Bulldogs (BCHL)	—
18	(Canada)	Arlo Merritt	Junior	F	6' 3" (1.91 m)	215 lb (98 kg)	2001-01-31	Halifax, Nova Scotia	Alberni Valley Bulldogs (BCHL)	—
19	(Canada)	Ethan Leyh (C)	Graduate (RS)	F	6' 0" (1.83 m)	195 lb (88 kg)	2001-06-07	Anmore, British Columbia	Quinnipiac (ECAC)	—
20	(United States)	A. J. Hodges	Graduate	F	6' 0" (1.83 m)	180 lb (82 kg)	2001-08-24	Littleton, Colorado	Michigan State (Big Ten)	—
21	(Germany)	Nik Armstrong-Kingkade	Graduate	F	5' 9" (1.75 m)	185 lb (84 kg)	1999-05-01	Mannheim, Germany	Massachusetts Lowell (HEA)	—
22	(United States)	Chase Davis	Sophomore	F	6' 4" (1.93 m)	210 lb (95 kg)	2002-04-08	Alpharetta, Georgia	Amarillo Wranglers (NAHL)	—
23	(United States)	Tucker Hodgson (A)	Senior	D	6' 3" (1.91 m)	195 lb (88 kg)	2001-06-07	Grand Forks, North Dakota	Fargo Force (USHL)	—
24	(Canada)	Colton Cameron	Sophomore	D	5' 11" (1.8 m)	190 lb (86 kg)	2002-07-07	Surrey, British Columbia	Prince George Spruce Kings (BCHL)	—
25	(United States)	Garrett Horsager	Sophomore	D	6' 0" (1.83 m)	180 lb (82 kg)	2002-02-02	Rosemount, Minnesota	Oklahoma Warriors (NAHL)	—
26	(United States)	Kolby Amici	Sophomore	F	5' 9" (1.75 m)	180 lb (82 kg)	2002-12-16	Orchard Park, New York	Minot Minotauros (NAHL)	—
27	(Canada)	Ryan Nause	Junior	D	5' 11" (1.8 m)	180 lb (82 kg)	2001-08-27	Riverview, New Brunswick	Alberni Valley Bulldogs (BCHL)	—
28	(Canada)	Tanner Main	Senior	D	5' 11" (1.8 m)	175 lb (79 kg)	2000-04-03	Welland, Ontario	Prince George Spruce Kings (BCHL)	—
29	(United States)	Nicholas Bevilacqua	Freshman	G	6' 0" (1.83 m)	190 lb (86 kg)	2003-08-06	Abington, Massachusetts	P.A.L. Jr. Islanders (NCDC)	—
33	(United States)	Connor Hasley	Junior	G	6' 1" (1.85 m)	193 lb (88 kg)	2001-02-27	North Tonawanda, New York	Cedar Rapids RoughRiders (USHL)	—
35	(Canada)	Max Beckford	Freshman	G	6' 2" (1.88 m)	205 lb (93 kg)	2003-01-30	London, Ontario	Wisconsin Windigo (NAHL)	—
38	(Canada)	Ryan Upson	Junior	F	6' 0" (1.83 m)	190 lb (86 kg)	2001-03-22	West Vancouver, British Columbia	Langley Rivermen (BCHL)	—

== Standings ==
2024–25 Atlantic Hockey America Standings
	Conference record										Overall record					
	GP	W	L	T	OW	OL	SW	PTS	GF	GA	GP	W	L	T	GF	GA
Holy Cross †	26	19	5	2	4	0	1	56	92	47	40	24	14	2	130	94
Sacred Heart	26	16	7	3	1	1	2	53	80	64	39	21	13	5	118	101
#19 Bentley *	26	16	9	1	1	2	1	51	79	57	40	23	15	2	115	83
Niagara	26	15	9	2	3	3	1	48	90	70	37	18	16	3	124	109
Army	26	14	10	2	2	0	2	44	84	74	38	16	20	2	105	117
Canisius	26	11	13	2	0	3	0	38	84	79	37	12	23	2	98	120
Air Force	26	11	13	2	2	3	1	37	59	58	40	16	21	3	86	112
American International	26	9	16	1	0	3	0	31	63	77	38	13	23	2	92	117
RIT	26	9	15	2	2	0	1	28	65	102	35	10	23	2	82	133
Robert Morris	26	7	15	4	1	2	1	27	72	86	35	10	20	5	95	115
Mercyhurst	26	4	19	3	1	0	2	16	59	113	35	4	27	4	77	150
Championship: March 22, 2025 † indicates conference regular season champion (DeGregorio Trophy) * indicates conference tournament champion (Riley Trophy); Rankings: USCHO.com Top 20 Poll

== Schedule and results ==
Date	Time	Opponent^{#}	Rank^{#}	Site	TV	Decision	Result	Attendance	Record
Regular season
October 5	7:00 pm	#14 Massachusetts*		Bentley Arena • Waltham, Massachusetts	FloHockey	Hasley	L 4–5	2,143	0–1–0
October 6	4:00 pm	Massachusetts Lowell*		Bentley Arena • Waltham, Massachusetts (Exhibition)	FloHockey		L 5–6		
October 12	7:00 pm	at New Hampshire*		Whittemore Center • Durham, New Hampshire	ESPN+	Hasley	L 1–2 ^{OT}	4,372	0–2–0
October 18	7:00 pm	Long Island*		Bentley Arena • Waltham, Massachusetts	FloHockey	Hasley	T 1–1 ^{OT}	1,232	0–2–1
October 19	7:00 pm	Long Island*		Bentley Arena • Waltham, Massachusetts	FloHockey	Beckford	W 3–1	867	1–2–1
October 25	7:00 pm	at Army		Tate Rink • West Point, New York	FloHockey	Hasley	W 6–3	1,786	2–2–1 (1–0–0)
October 26	4:00 pm	at Army		Tate Rink • West Point, New York	FloHockey	Beckford	L 1–4	1,917	2–3–1 (1–1–0)
November 1	7:00 pm	Sacred Heart		Bentley Arena • Waltham, Massachusetts	FloHockey	Hasley	W 4–2	1,100	3–3–1 (2–1–0)
November 2	7:00 pm	at Sacred Heart		Martire Family Arena • Fairfield, Connecticut	FloHockey	Hasley	W 6–4	2,229	4–3–1 (3–1–0)
November 8	7:00 pm	RIT		Bentley Arena • Waltham, Massachusetts	FloHockey	Hasley	W 5–0	1,050	5–3–1 (4–1–0)
November 9	4:00 pm	RIT		Bentley Arena • Waltham, Massachusetts	FloHockey	Hasley	L 2–6	1,234	5–4–1 (4–2–0)
November 15	7:00 pm	American International		Bentley Arena • Waltham, Massachusetts	FloHockey	Beckford	W 5–2	1,050	6–4–1 (5–2–0)
November 16	6:00 pm	American International		Bentley Arena • Waltham, Massachusetts	FloHockey	Hasley	W 3–0	850	7–4–1 (6–2–0)
November 22	7:00 pm	Air Force		Bentley Arena • Waltham, Massachusetts	FloHockey	Hasley	W 2–0	1,124	8–4–1 (7–2–0)
November 23	4:00 pm	Air Force		Bentley Arena • Waltham, Massachusetts	FloHockey	Hasley	W 2–0	1,257	9–4–1 (8–2–0)
December 1	3:00 pm	at Northeastern*		Matthews Arena • Boston, Massachusetts	ESPN+	Hasley	L 1–3	2,103	9–5–1
December 6	7:00 pm	at Mercyhurst		Mercyhurst Ice Center • Erie, Pennsylvania	FloHockey	Hasley	W 4–2	1,189	10–5–1 (9–2–0)
December 7	5:00 pm	at Mercyhurst		Mercyhurst Ice Center • Erie, Pennsylvania	FloHockey	Hasley	T 2–2 ^{SOW}	1,172	10–5–2 (9–2–1)
December 29	4:00 pm	vs. #4 Maine*		Cross Insurance Arena • Portland, Maine	ESPN+	Hasley	W 4–2	5,893	11–5–2
January 3	7:00 pm	at Niagara		Dwyer Arena • Lewiston, New York	FloHockey	Hasley	L 2–3 ^{OT}	547	11–6–2 (9–3–1)
January 4	5:00 pm	at Niagara		Dwyer Arena • Lewiston, New York	FloHockey	Hasley	L 2–4	1,037	11–7–2 (9–4–1)
January 10	9:05 pm	at Air Force		Cadet Ice Arena • USAF Academy, Colorado	FloHockey	Hasley	W 1–0	2,479	12–7–2 (10–4–1)
January 11	7:05 pm	at Air Force		Cadet Ice Arena • USAF Academy, Colorado	FloHockey	Hasley	L 1–4	2,507	12–8–2 (10–5–1)
January 17	7:00 pm	Holy Cross		Bentley Arena • Waltham, Massachusetts	FloHockey	Hasley	L 2–3 ^{OT}	1,580	12–9–2 (10–6–1)
January 18	6:00 pm	Holy Cross		Bentley Arena • Waltham, Massachusetts	FloHockey	Hasley	L 1–5	1,522	12–10–2 (10–7–1)
January 21	7:00 pm	at American International		MassMutual Center • Springfield, Massachusetts	FloHockey	Hasley	W 6–1	258	13–10–2 (11–7–1)
January 25	7:00 pm	at Princeton*		Hobey Baker Memorial Rink • Princeton, New Jersey	ESPN+	Hasley	L 1–3	1,586	13–11–2
January 26	4:00 pm	at Princeton*		Hobey Baker Memorial Rink • Princeton, New Jersey	ESPN+	Bevilacqua	L 0–1 ^{OT}	1,337	13–12–2
February 4	7:00 pm	Army		Bentley Arena • Waltham, Massachusetts	FloHockey	Hasley	W 5–2	1,367	14–12–2 (12–7–1)
February 7	7:00 pm	Robert Morris		Bentley Arena • Waltham, Massachusetts	FloHockey	Hasley	W 1–0	1,467	15–12–2 (13–7–1)
February 8	6:00 pm	Robert Morris		Bentley Arena • Waltham, Massachusetts	FloHockey	Hasley	W 6–0	1,210	16–12–2 (14–7–1)
February 14	7:00 pm	Canisius		Bentley Arena • Waltham, Massachusetts	FloHockey	Hasley	W 4–3 ^{OT}	1,145	17–12–2 (15–7–1)
February 15	4:00 pm	Canisius		Bentley Arena • Waltham, Massachusetts	FloHockey	Hasley	L 3–5	1,407	17–13–2 (15–8–1)
February 20	7:00 pm	at Holy Cross		Hart Center • Worcester, Massachusetts	FloHockey	Hasley	W 3–0	1,655	18–13–2 (16–8–1)
February 22	6:00 pm	at Sacred Heart		Martire Family Arena • Fairfield, Connecticut	FloHockey	Hasley	L 0–2	1,655	18–14–2 (16–9–1)
Atlantic Hockey America tournament
March 7	7:00 pm	Canisius*		Bentley Arena • Waltham, Massachusetts (AHA Quarterfinal Game 1)	FloHockey	Hasley	W 4–0	1,389	19–14–2
March 8	7:00 pm	Canisius*		Bentley Arena • Waltham, Massachusetts (AHA Quarterfinal Game 2)	FloHockey	Hasley	W 2–0	1,204	20–14–2
March 14	7:00 pm	at Sacred Heart*		Martire Family Arena • Fairfield, Connecticut (AHA Semifinal Game 1)	FloHockey	Hasley	W 5–2	2,301	21–14–2
March 15	5:00 pm	at Sacred Heart*		Martire Family Arena • Fairfield, Connecticut (AHA Semifinal Game 2)	FloHockey	Hasley	W 3–0	2,700	22–14–2
March 22	7:00 pm	at #19 Holy Cross*		Hart Center • Worcester, Massachusetts (AHA Championship)	FloHockey	Hasley	W 6–3	2,717	23–14–2
NCAA Tournament
March 28	2:00 pm	vs. #2 Boston College*	#20	SNHU Arena • Manchester, New Hampshire (Regional Semifinal)	ESPNU	Hasley	L 1–3	7,368	23–15–2
*Non-conference game. ^{#}Rankings from USCHO.com Poll. All times are in Eastern Time. Source:

== NCAA tournament ==
March 28, 2025; 2:00 pm	(1) Boston College	3–1 (1–0, 0–1, 2–0)	(4) Bentley	SNHU Arena; Attendance: 7,368

Game reference

Jacob Fowler
Goalies
Connor Hasley
Referees:
Sterling Egan
Bruce Vida Jr.
Linesmen:
Patrick Giles
Nick Huff

(Leonard, J. Hagens) Gabe Perreault (16) – 16:45	1–0
	1–1	23:21 – PP – Ethan Leyh (17) (Castagna, Bochen)
(Minnetian, Fortescue) James Hagens (11) – GW – 58:43	2–1
(Hreschuk) Ryan Leonard (30) – EN – 59:28	3–1

6 min
Penalties
10 min
44
Shots
21

Game summary
The game started with BC being able to get the puck in deep while the Falcons could barely get over the blueline. While neither team was able to establish any real zone time, the Eagles were able to get several shots on Connor Hasley in the first few minutes. On one such exchange around the 4-minute mark, Hasley was unable to freeze the puck but got a lucky break when the ref lost sight of the puck and blew the whistle erroneously. Around the same time, Ryan Leonard ran into Hasley after being knocked down and the two forced the net off its moorings. On a later play, Hasley was able to push the net out of place with his leg, continuing an issue that the ice crew had been dealing with since before the start of the match. The game was paused for several minutes to give the maintenance team time to try and reset the pegs. On the ensuing play, Bentley appeared to commit two separate infractions, at least according to the BC faithful, but the referees disagreed. With the Eagles unable to buy a questionable call, Boston College started trying to push Bentley around after the whistle to see if they could goad one of the Falcons into making a mistake. While BC attempted to plant that seed, they persisted with the offensive pressure. The Eagles were able to tilt the ice towards the Falcons' end and set up in the offensive zone and besieged Hasley for several minutes in the middle of the period. A further potential Bentley penalty went uncalled by the referees who appeared to have decided to just let the two teams play. In spite of the lack of power plays, BC led in shots 10–0 halfway through the period. Bentley got a break when BC committed an icing call, giving the Falcons their first offensive zone draw of the game with 9 minutes to play. BC won the faceoff but then immediately iced the puck a second time. The second draw was a little closer but BC still managed to clear the zone. Moments later, the first penalty of the game was on Aidan Hreschuk for crosschecking. Many in the crowd were in disbelief with the borderline call after the earlier plays that had been let go. BC went on the attack during the disadvantage and was able to get a disjointed break on the Benley goal. After the Falcons regain possession they were able to set up their power play and get their first two shots of the match. While he had not seen any action to that point, Jacob Fowler was equal to the task. Once even strength play resumed, BC tried to get right back to their dominant play. Bentley, however, was able to built off their failed power play and finally break through the Boston College defense. Play evened out in the later part of the period but a bad turnover at the far blueline led to a rush up the ice by BC. Leonard found Gabe Perreault open down low and the winger moved around Hasley and slipped the puck into the net. Undaunted, Bentley went on the attack to try and get the goal back but they were unable to get a good shot on goal. With about a minute to play, the BC goal had trouble staying in position so the game was paused for a second time to fix the problem. When play resumed for a second time, BC's upped their offensive pressure. Hasley was forced to scramble but managed to keep the puck out until the horn sounded.

The second began with the two teams exchanging chances off the rush and, after a minute, the net behind Hasley was knocked from its mooring. On the ensuing play, BC was able to halt a Bentley rush but Lukas Gustafsson took a tripping minor in doing so. The Falcons had trouble setting up in the offensive zone but when they were finally able to do so, Ethan Leyh got two solid shots on goal, the second of which beat Fowler. After the ensuing faceoff, BC was able to finally draw it first power play with Jake Black grabbed James Hagens twice. The BC man-advantage was able to get several good looks at the goal but Bentley was able to block several shots while the rest either went wide or were stopped by Hasley. After Bentley iced the puck, the Falcon net was knocked out of place for the third time and the game paused once again to try and resolve the issue. After what was essentially an extra TV timeout, Bentley was able to clear the puck and relieve the pressure. Boston College remained in control for long stretches with occasional counters by Bentley. Near the middle of the period, Hasley bobbled a glove save but with no Eagle nearby the goaltender was able to smother the puck for a faceoff. By the midway point of the game it was apparent that Boston College was the better of the two and Bentley was only in the match thanks to a herculean defensive effort. Even, so, the game was tied and Nik Armstrong-Kingkade nearly gave the Falcons the lead when he hit the post on a solo rush. Just seconds later, the Falcons made a bad line change and were called for too many men. Boston College's second power play appeared to work to perfection and Perreault had a half-open cage but the puck was on edge and his shot went high and wide. Afterwards, the teams took matching minors that didn't change the makeup of the game but did take two of the top players off of the ice. When play resumed, the net behind Hasley was knocked off for the fourth time on the night and the problem was becoming as much of a story in the game as the players. The stoppage helped to kill off the rest of the BC power play as well as slow down the pace of play. The two teams carried the puck up and down the ice but neither was able to generate a good scoring chance for several minutes. With under 3 minutes to play, Bentley got on the attack but hit the post with another shot. The waning moments saw both team trying and failing to break through the defenses and the period ended with the two squads knotted at one.

Early in the third, Bentley was able to turn over the puck in the BC end and get themselves a couple of good looks at the net but strong play from the Eagle defense prevent either opportunity from reaching Fowler. Boston College countered and got a hard shot on goal that Hasley was unable to cover but the Falcons were first on the puck and able to clear it from danger. Further strong play from both the BC and Bentley defenses kept the puck out of the respective goals and both teams seemed dead set on doing everything they could to keep the other from scoring. Despite the emphasis in their own ends, the two teams were able to generate several scoring opportunities but neither could follow up after the initial shot. BC continued to press in spite of their failed attempts and eventually drew another power play when Armstrong-Kingkade was called for kneeing in the seventh minute. Bentley was able to kill off the first half of the man-advantage with relative ease but just as the power play was winging down, Arlo Merritt took a tripping penalty to extend BC's advantage. Perreault hit the outside of the post off of the ensuing faceoff and then Bentley was able to just disrupt the Eagles structure enough to force a turnover, then an offsides and finally an icing. The Falcons seemed to take heart at the mistakes made by Boston College and the defense remained locked in, continually blocking shots and passes to kill off the entire stretch of BC power play. Afterwards, Bentley began to play defense almost as if they had the lead but the result was that BC had great difficulty getting through on the rush. Even so, a bad turnover in the Falcons end gave James Hagens a glorious look at the goal but he delayed too long and by the time he shot the puck one of the Falcons was able to get his stick in the way and deflect the puck out of play. Boston College kept trying to set up passing plays and Bentley continued to get sticks and bodies in the way. With about 5 minutes to go, Bentley was able to get some pressure on Fowler but the BC netminder matched his counterpart by stopping the multi-shot attempt. With snow building up around the ice, BC committed consecutive icings near the end of the period but were able to clear the puck after each faceoff. With under two minutes to play, BC was finally able to follow up a rush and, after forcing a turnover, James Hagens was able to grab a loose puck behind the net and wrap it around for the go ahead goal. Bentley called a timeout to get themselves set for the final 77 seconds. BC got possession of the puck and forced Bentley to play in their end for several seconds. After the Falcons second attempt at zone entry, Hasley was pulled and, a moment later, Ryan Leonard netted an empty-net goal to salt away the game.

== Scoring statistics ==
Name	Position	Games	Goals	Assists	Points	PIM
Ethan Leyh	F	37	17	25	42	29
Nick Bochen	D	40	9	21	30	31
Nik Armstrong-Kingkade	F	38	12	15	27	16
Stephen Castagna	F	40	5	20	25	19
A. J. Hodges	LW	30	9	9	18	8
Ryan Mansfield	LW	31	8	10	18	4
Oskar Kind Bakkevig	RW	28	10	6	16	29
Kellan Hjartarson	F	40	8	8	16	4
Arlo Merritt	C	35	8	7	15	10
Samuel Duerr	D	37	8	7	15	12
Artem Buzoberya	LW	32	6	9	15	4
Ryan Upson	F	33	1	12	13	6
Tanner Main	D	35	2	7	9	18
Garrett Horsager	D	37	0	9	9	31
Jimmy Doyle	RW	32	0	8	8	6
Jake Black	F	22	4	3	7	6
Chase Davis	F	25	3	4	7	4
Tucker Hodgson	D	40	3	4	7	22
Oliver Salo	F	31	2	4	6	8
Colton Cameron	D	38	0	5	5	10
Peter Kramer	F	22	0	4	4	8
David Helledy	D	25	0	2	2	6
Nicholas Bevilacqua	G	1	0	0	0	0
Max Beckford	G	4	0	0	0	0
Kolby Amici	F	5	0	0	0	2
Seth Bernard-Docker	D	8	0	0	0	0
Pat Lawn	D	8	0	0	0	2
Ryan Nause	D	19	0	0	0	6
Connor Hasley	G	36	0	0	0	0
Bench	–	–	–	–	–	12
Total			115	199	314	311

== Goaltending statistics ==
Name	Games	Minutes	Wins	Losses	Ties	Goals Against	Saves	Shut Outs	SV %	GAA
Nicholas Bevilacqua	1	60:33	0	1	0	1	20	0	.952	0.99
Max Beckford	4	195:47	2	1	0	6	55	0	.902	1.84
Connor Hasley	36	2147:22	21	13	2	70	859	11	.925	1.96
Empty Net	-	17:20	-	-	-	6	-	-	-	-
Total	40	2421:02	23	15	2	83	934	11	.918	2.06

== Rankings ==
Poll	Week																											
Poll	Pre	1	2	3	4	5	6	7	8	9	10	11	12	13	14	15	16	17	18	19	20	21	22	23	24	25	26	27 (Final)
USCHO.com	NR	NR	NR	NR	NR	NR	NR	NR	NR	NR	NR	NR	-	NR	NR	NR	NR	NR	NR	NR	NR	NR	NR	NR	RV	20	-	19
USA Hockey	NR	NR	NR	NR	NR	NR	NR	NR	NR	NR	NR	NR	-	NR	NR	NR	NR	NR	NR	NR	NR	NR	NR	NR	RV	20	20	20

Note: USCHO did not release a poll in week 12 or 26.
Note: USA Hockey did not release a poll in week 12.

== Awards and honors ==
Player	Award	Ref
Ethan Leyh	Atlantic Hockey America Best Defensive Forward	
Connor Hasley	Atlantic Hockey America Tournament Most Outstanding Player	
Nick Bochen	All-Atlantic Hockey America First Team	
Ethan Leyh	All-Atlantic Hockey America First Team	
Connor Hasley	All-Atlantic Hockey America Second Team	
Connor Hasley	Atlantic Hockey America All-Tournament Team	
Nick Bochen	Atlantic Hockey America All-Tournament Team	
A. J. Hodges	Atlantic Hockey America All-Tournament Team	
Nik Armstrong-Kingkade	Atlantic Hockey America All-Tournament Team	
