= 2024–25 Niagara Purple Eagles men's ice hockey season =

- Conference: 4th AHA
- Home ice: Dwyer Arena

Rankings
- USCHO: NR
- USA Hockey: NR

Record
- Overall: 18–16–3
- Conference: 15–9–2
- Home: 9–9–2
- Road: 9–7–1

Coaches and captains
- Head coach: Jason Lammers
- Assistant coaches: Mark Phalon; Nate Skidmore
- Captain: Jay Ahearn

The 2024–25 Niagara Purple Eagles men's ice hockey season was the 29th season of play for the program, the 27th at the Division I level and the 1st in Atlantic Hockey America. The Purple Eagles represented Niagara University in the 2024–25 NCAA Division I men's ice hockey season, played their homes games at the Dwyer Arena and were coached by Jason Lammers in his 8th season.

== Season ==
Niagara entered the season in a rather unique position. For the first time since Bentley in 2018, Niagara was the only league member to have one of its freshman class selected in the NHL draft. Trevor Hoskin would prove to be an offensive boon to the Purple Eagles, finishing the year tied for the team lead in scoring alongside team captain Jay Ahearn. With the offense improved from the year before, the team was also able to rely on steady goaltending from graduate transfer Pierce Charleson who was the team primary starter for the entire season. Unfortunately, the defense was a little weaker, allowing an average of more than 4 shots per game more than they had the year before. Over the course of the season, those numbers add up to give their opponents many more chances on the Niagara goal, forcing Charleson and the offense to stay on their toes.

Despite the more porous defense, the Purple Eagles played well throughout the season. While the team didn't have the best of results in their non-conference play, their 2–5–1 mark was still among the best in the conference. The team didn't suffer from any extended losing steaks, their worst being three games, and they were consistently in the top half of the standings. The solid, though unspectacular, season ended with the Eagles in 4th place, their best finish in over a decade. The reward for such a performance was bye into the quarterfinal round and few more home games to potentially extend their year.

Unfortunately for Niagara, their opponent was one of the hottest teams in the second half of the season as Army had gone 9–2–2 in the seven weeks prior. Niagara's offense was on full display, scoring the opening goal in each of their three games against the Black Knights but the defense was unable to contain the cadets. Over the three games, two of which going into overtime, Army fired 148 shots on goal. Charleson did yeoman's work in the series, posting a save percentage of .932 and limiting Army to two goals on fourteen power play opportunities. However, his efforts were in vain, as the Knights were twice able to win in extra time and end the Eagles' season in heartbreaking fashion.

== Departures ==
Player	Position	Nationality	Cause
Jarrett Fiske	Goaltender	United States	Graduation (signed with Utah Grizzlies)
Olivier Gauthier	Forward	United States	Graduation (signed with Ste-Adèle HCVC)
Christian Gorscak	Forward	United States	Graduation (signed with Kalkaska Battlers)
Aron Jessli	Forward	Norway	Returned to juniors (Madison Capitols)
Steven Kesslering	Forward	Canada	Transferred to Regina
Josh Lacelle	Goaltender	Canada	Rejoined club team
Jaedon Leslie	Forward	Canada	Graduation (retired)
Cole Mickel	Defenseman	United States	Transferred to Saint Mary's
Connor Mylymok	Forward	United States	Graduation (signed with Idaho Steelheads)
Josef Myšák	Defenseman	Czech Republic	Graduate transfer to Merrimack
Ryan Ouellette	Goaltender	United States	Transferred to Northern Michigan
Carter Randklev	Forward	United States	Graduate transfer to Bemidji State
Jack Richard	Forward	Canada	Transferred to Merrimack
Max Ruoho	Defenseman	United States	Transferred to Wisconsin-Eau Claire

== Recruiting ==
Player	Position	Nationality	Age	Notes
Pierce Charleson	Goaltender	Canada	24	Aurora, ON; graduate transfer from Alaska
Rainers Dārziņš	Forward	Latvia	20	Tukums, LAT
Grayson Dietrich	Forward	Canada	22	Calgary, AB; transfer from American International
Braden Doyle	Defenseman	United States	23	Lynnfield, MA; transfer from Northeastern; selected 157th overall in 2019
Trevor Hoskin	Forward	Canada	20	Belleville, ON; selected 106th overall in 2024
Kyler Kleven	Forward	United States	23	Moorhead, MN; transfer from Minnesota Duluth
Ray Murakami	Defenseman	Japan	21	Tomakomai, JPN
Nathan Oickle	Defenseman	Canada	21	Peterborough, ON
Andy Reist	Forward	Canada	20	Waterloo, ON
Brett Roloson	Forward	United States	23	Worcester, MA; transfer from Lake Superior State
Ross Roloson	Forward	United States	23	Woodbury, MN; transfer from Lake Superior State
Deivs Rolovs	Goaltender	Latvia	20	Riga, LAT
Spencer Young	Forward	Canada	21	Elmira, ON

== Roster ==
As of August 26, 2024.

No.	Nat.	Player	Class	Pos	Height	Weight	DoB	Hometown	Previous team	NHL rights
1	(Latvia)	Deivids Rolovs	Freshman	G	6' 2" (1.88 m)	183 lb (83 kg)	2004-05-08	Riga, Latvia	Lone Star Brahmas (NAHL)	—
2	(United States)	Jonathan Ziskie	Junior	F	6' 3" (1.91 m)	187 lb (85 kg)	2001-03-19	Macomb, Michigan	Bismarck Bobcats (NAHL)	—
4	(Latvia)	Gļebs Prohorenkovs	Junior	F	6' 2" (1.88 m)	187 lb (85 kg)	2001-11-12	Riga, Latvia	Amarillo Wranglers (NAHL)	—
5	(United States)	Noah Carlin	Senior	D	6' 0" (1.83 m)	174 lb (79 kg)	2000-06-13	Marine City, Michigan	Omaha Lancers (USHL)	—
7	(Canada)	Nathan Oickle	Freshman	D	5' 10" (1.78 m)	165 lb (75 kg)	2003-02-05	Peterborough, Ontario	Surrey Eagles (BCHL)	—
8	(Canada)	Luke Mylymok	Graduate	F	5' 11" (1.8 m)	183 lb (83 kg)	2001-09-29	Wilcox, Saskatchewan	Minnesota Duluth (NCHC)	—
9	(United States)	Jay Ahearn (C)	Senior	F	5' 11" (1.8 m)	170 lb (77 kg)	2001-05-23	Staten Island, New York	Johnstown Tomahawks (NAHL)	—
10	(Canada)	Trevor Hoskin	Freshman	F	6' 1" (1.85 m)	174 lb (79 kg)	2004-05-18	Belleville, Ontario	Cobourg Cougars (OJHL)	CGY, 106th overall 2024
11	(United States)	Kyler Kleven	Senior	F	5' 11" (1.8 m)	172 lb (78 kg)	2000-10-12	Moorhead, Minnesota	Minnesota Duluth (NCHC)	—
12	(United States)	Ross Roloson	Sophomore	D	5' 11" (1.8 m)	175 lb (79 kg)	2003-01-30	Woodbury, Minnesota	Lake Superior State (CCHA)	—
13	(Canada)	Grayson Dietrich	Junior	F	6' 2" (1.88 m)	190 lb (86 kg)	2001-12-18	Calgary, Alberta	American International (AHA)	—
14	(Latvia)	Rainers Dārziņš	Freshman	F	5' 10" (1.78 m)	168 lb (76 kg)	2004-05-06	Tukums, Latvia	Skellefteå AIK J20 (J20 Nationell)	—
16	(Canada)	Andy Reist	Freshman	F	6' 0" (1.83 m)	174 lb (79 kg)	2004-05-15	Waterloo, Ontario	Cobourg Cougars (OJHL)	—
17	(Canada)	Spencer Young	Freshman	F	6' 0" (1.83 m)	174 lb (79 kg)	2003-08-25	Elmira, Ontario	Collingwood Blues (OJHL)	—
18	(Canada)	Tyler Wallace	Sophomore	F	6' 2" (1.88 m)	188 lb (85 kg)	2002-05-19	Calgary, Alberta	Blackfalds Bulldogs (AJHL)	—
19	(United States)	Drew Vieten	Junior	F	6' 1" (1.85 m)	190 lb (86 kg)	2001-01-10	Calabasas, California	Wichita Falls Warriors (NAHL)	—
21	(United States)	Shane Ott	Senior	F	6' 1" (1.85 m)	181 lb (82 kg)	2000-07-21	Centennial, Colorado	Janesville Jets (NAHL)	—
22	(Canada)	Lane Brockhoff	Senior	D	6' 1" (1.85 m)	207 lb (94 kg)	2000-04-11	Edberg, Alberta	Camrose Kodiaks (AJHL)	—
23	(Norway)	Lars Rødne	Senior	F	6' 0" (1.83 m)	181 lb (82 kg)	2000-07-22	Stavanager, Norway	Bismarck Bobcats (NAHL)	—
24	(United States)	Braden Doyle	Senior	D	6' 0" (1.83 m)	177 lb (80 kg)	2001-08-24	Lynnfield, Massachusetts	Northeastern (HEA)	LAK, 157th overall 2019
25	(United States)	Johnny Wescoe	Junior	F	5' 8" (1.73 m)	150 lb (68 kg)	2001-01-06	Mechanicsburg, Pennsylvania	Rockets Hockey Club (NCDC)	—
26	(United States)	Alex Murray	Senior	D	5' 11" (1.8 m)	183 lb (83 kg)	2000-03-17	Glenview, Illinois	Miami (NCHC)	—
27	(Japan)	Ray Murakami	Freshman	D	6' 0" (1.83 m)	181 lb (82 kg)	2003-04-03	Tomakomai, Japan	Lone Star Brahmas (NAHL)	—
28	(Canada)	Ethan Lund	Junior	D	5' 10" (1.78 m)	185 lb (84 kg)	2001-03-16	Calgary, Alberta	Brooks Bandits (AJHL)	—
29	(United States)	Brett Roloson	Senior	F	5' 11" (1.8 m)	160 lb (73 kg)	2000-12-29	Worcester, Massachusetts	Lake Superior State (CCHA)	—
30	(United States)	Mitchell Day	Sophomore	G	5' 10" (1.78 m)	175 lb (79 kg)	2002-01-18	St. Louis, Missouri	North Iowa Bulls (NAHL)	—
34	(Canada)	Noah Hackett	Junior	F	6' 1" (1.85 m)	174 lb (79 kg)	2001-12-11	Ponoka, Alberta	Brooks Bandits (AJHL)	—
39	(Canada)	Pierce Charleson	Graduate	G	6' 2" (1.88 m)	193 lb (88 kg)	2000-02-27	Aurora, Ontario	Alaska (NCAA)	—

== Standings ==
2024–25 Atlantic Hockey America Standings
	Conference record										Overall record					
	GP	W	L	T	OW	OL	SW	PTS	GF	GA	GP	W	L	T	GF	GA
Holy Cross †	26	19	5	2	4	0	1	56	92	47	40	24	14	2	130	94
Sacred Heart	26	16	7	3	1	1	2	53	80	64	39	21	13	5	118	101
#19 Bentley *	26	16	9	1	1	2	1	51	79	57	40	23	15	2	115	83
Niagara	26	15	9	2	3	3	1	48	90	70	37	18	16	3	124	109
Army	26	14	10	2	2	0	2	44	84	74	38	16	20	2	105	117
Canisius	26	11	13	2	0	3	0	38	84	79	37	12	23	2	98	120
Air Force	26	11	13	2	2	3	1	37	59	58	40	16	21	3	86	112
American International	26	9	16	1	0	3	0	31	63	77	38	13	23	2	92	117
RIT	26	9	15	2	2	0	1	28	65	102	35	10	23	2	82	133
Robert Morris	26	7	15	4	1	2	1	27	72	86	35	10	20	5	95	115
Mercyhurst	26	4	19	3	1	0	2	16	59	113	35	4	27	4	77	150
Championship: March 22, 2025 † indicates conference regular season champion (DeGregorio Trophy) * indicates conference tournament champion (Riley Trophy); Rankings: USCHO.com Top 20 Poll

== Schedule and results ==
Date	Time	Opponent^{#}	Rank^{#}	Site	TV	Decision	Result	Attendance	Record
Exhibition
October 6	2:00 pm	at Ohio State*		Value City Arena • Columbus, Ohio (Exhibition)		Day	L 2–3 ^{OT}		
Regular Season
October 11	7:00 pm	at Clarkson*		Cheel Arena • Potsdam, New York	ESPN+	Charleson	L 2–4	1,891	0–1–0
October 12	7:00 pm	at St. Lawrence*		Appleton Arena • Canton, New York	ESPN+	Rolovs	L 3–4	1,250	0–2–0
October 18	7:00 pm	at Rensselaer*		Houston Field House • Troy, New York	ESPN+	Charleson	T 3–3 ^{OT}	2,303	0–2–1
October 19	5:00 pm	at Rensselaer*		Houston Field House • Troy, New York	ESPN+	Charleson	W 5–4 ^{OT}	2,676	1–2–1
October 25	7:00 pm	at Robert Morris		Clearview Arena • Neville Township, Pennsylvania	FloHockey	Charleson	W 7–3	751	2–2–1 (1–0–0)
October 26	7:00 pm	Robert Morris		Dwyer Arena • Lewiston, New York	FloHockey	Charleson	T 4–4 ^{SOL}	1,176	2–2–2 (1–0–1)
October 30	7:00 pm	RIT		Dwyer Arena • Lewiston, New York	FloHockey	Charleson	W 4–1	883	3–2–2 (2–0–1)
November 1	7:00 pm	Mercyhurst		Dwyer Arena • Lewiston, New York	FloHockey	Charleson	W 5–3	807	4–2–2 (3–0–1)
November 2	7:00 pm	at Mercyhurst		Mercyhurst Ice Center • Erie, Pennsylvania	FloHockey	Charleson	L 3–4 ^{OT}	891	4–3–2 (3–1–1)
November 8	7:00 pm	at Army		Tate Rink • West Point, New York	FloHockey	Charleson	L 0–1	1,539	4–4–2 (3–2–1)
November 9	4:00 pm	at Army		Tate Rink • West Point, New York	FloHockey	Charleson	W 2–0	1,742	5–4–2 (4–2–1)
November 15	7:00 pm	at Holy Cross		Dwyer Arena • Lewiston, New York	FloHockey	Charleson	T 3–3 ^{SOW}	672	5–4–3 (4–2–2)
November 16	5:00 pm	at Holy Cross		Dwyer Arena • Lewiston, New York	FloHockey	Charleson	W 3–2	656	6–4–3 (5–2–2)
November 23	1:00 pm	at American International		MassMutual Center • Springfield, Massachusetts	FloHockey	Charleson	W 2–1	—	7–4–3 (6–2–2)
November 24	3:00 pm	at American International		MassMutual Center • Springfield, Massachusetts	FloHockey	Charleson	L 2–5	259	7–5–3 (6–3–2)
November 29	6:00 pm	Union*		Dwyer Arena • Lewiston, New York	FloHockey	Rolovs	L 2–4	769	7–6–3
November 30	5:00 pm	Union*		Dwyer Arena • Lewiston, New York	FloHockey	Charleson	L 3–5	628	7–7–3
December 6	9:05 pm	at Air Force		Cadet Ice Arena • USAF Academy, Colorado	FloHockey, Altitude 2	Charleson	W 3–2 ^{OT}	2,521	8–7–3 (7–3–2)
December 7	7:05 pm	at Air Force		Cadet Ice Arena • USAF Academy, Colorado	FloHockey	Charleson	L 2–4	2,439	8–8–3 (7–4–2)
December 30	2:00 pm	Guelph*		Dwyer Arena • Lewiston, New York (Exhibition)	FloHockey	Charleson	W 5–2	275	
January 3	7:00 pm	Bentley		Dwyer Arena • Lewiston, New York	FloHockey	Charleson	W 3–2 ^{OT}	547	9–8–3 (8–4–2)
January 4	5:00 pm	Bentley		Dwyer Arena • Lewiston, New York	FloHockey	Charleson	W 4–2	1,037	10–8–3 (9–4–2)
January 10	6:00 pm	Alaska Anchorage*		Dwyer Arena • Lewiston, New York	FloHockey	Charleson	W 6–2	487	11–8–3
January 11	7:00 pm	Alaska Anchorage*		Dwyer Arena • Lewiston, New York	FloHockey	Day	L 1–3	594	11–9–3
January 17	7:00 pm	at Mercyhurst		Mercyhurst Ice Center • Erie, Pennsylvania	FloHockey	Charleson	L 1–5	1,238	11–10–3 (9–5–2)
January 18	7:00 pm	Mercyhurst		Dwyer Arena • Lewiston, New York	FloHockey	Charleson	W 6–3	551	12–10–3 (10–5–2)
January 24	7:05 pm	at RIT		Gene Polisseni Center • Henrietta, New York	FloHockey	Charleson	W 7–0	3,946	13–10–3 (11–5–2)
January 25	5:05 pm	at RIT		Gene Polisseni Center • Henrietta, New York	FloHockey	Charleson	W 6–3	4,300	14–10–3 (12–5–2)
January 31	7:00 pm	Sacred Heart		Dwyer Arena • Lewiston, New York	FloHockey	Charleson	L 2–3	691	14–11–3 (12–6–2)
February 1	7:00 pm	Sacred Heart		Dwyer Arena • Lewiston, New York	FloHockey	Charleson	L 2–3 ^{OT}	694	14–12–3 (12–7–2)
February 11	7:00 pm	Canisius		Dwyer Arena • Lewiston, New York (Rivalry)	FloHockey	Charleson	W 6–2	889	15–12–3 (13–7–2)
February 14	6:00 pm	Robert Morris		Dwyer Arena • Lewiston, New York	FloHockey	Charleson	L 3–4	994	15–13–3 (13–8–2)
February 15	7:00 pm	at Robert Morris		Clearview Arena • Neville Township, Pennsylvania	FloHockey	Charleson	W 2–1	510	16–13–3 (14–8–2)
February 21	7:00 pm	at Canisius		LECOM Harborcenter • Buffalo, New York (Rivalry)	FloHockey	Charleson	W 6–3	1,492	17–13–3 (15–8–2)
February 22	7:00 pm	Canisius		Dwyer Arena • Lewiston, New York (Rivalry)	FloHockey	Charleson	L 2–6	1,649	17–14–3 (15–9–2)
Atlantic Hockey America Tournament
March 7	7:00 pm	Army*		Dwyer Arena • Lewiston, New York (AHA Quarterfinal Game 1)	FloHockey	Charleson	L 2–3 ^{2OT}	603	17–15–3
March 8	7:00 pm	Army*		Dwyer Arena • Lewiston, New York (AHA Quarterfinal Game 2)	FloHockey	Charleson	W 4–3	618	18–15–3
March 9	5:00 pm	Army*		Dwyer Arena • Lewiston, New York (AHA Quarterfinal Game 3)	FloHockey	Charleson	L 3–4 ^{OT}	608	18–16–3
*Non-conference game. ^{#}Rankings from USCHO.com Poll. All times are in Eastern Time. Source:

== Scoring statistics ==
Name	Position	Games	Goals	Assists	Points	PIM
Jay Ahearn	F	36	19	20	39	23
Trevor Hoskin	C/RW	36	12	27	39	12
Shane Ott	F	35	9	25	34	10
Gļebs Prohorenkovs	F	37	9	22	31	16
Tyler Wallace	C	37	14	12	26	12
Noah Hackett	F	36	11	7	18	10
Alex Murray	D	37	3	14	17	28
Lars Rødne	LW	29	10	4	14	6
Ross Roloson	D	37	3	11	14	6
Spencer Young	C	34	7	5	12	19
Grayson Dietrich	C/LW	32	5	6	11	33
Braden Doyle	D	37	1	9	10	12
Kyler Kleven	C	26	3	6	9	10
Nathan Oickle	D	37	3	6	9	14
Brett Roloson	F	26	1	7	8	0
Andy Reist	F	32	1	7	8	16
Noah Carlin	D	37	4	3	7	18
Ethan Lund	D	27	2	5	7	14
Drew Vieten	F	20	2	3	5	4
Ray Murakami	D	17	2	2	4	2
Johnny Wescoe	F	26	1	2	3	2
Luke Mylymok	C/W	10	1	1	2	2
Jonathan Ziskie	D	7	1	0	1	0
Lane Brockhoff	D	15	0	1	1	4
Mitchell Day	G	1	0	0	0	0
Deivids Rolovs	G	2	0	0	0	0
Rainers Dārziņš	RW	3	0	0	0	0
Pierce Charleson	G	34	0	0	0	0
Total			124	204	328	277

== Goaltending statistics ==
Name	Games	Minutes	Wins	Losses	Ties	Goals against	Saves	Shut outs	SV %	GAA
Pierce Charleson	34	2086:33	18	13	3	96	1122	2	.921	2.76
Mitchell Day	2	54:25	0	1	0	3	17	0	.850	3.31
Deivids Rolovs	3	120:14	0	2	0	7	53	0	.883	3.49
Empty Net	-	29:43	-	-	-	3	-	-	-	-
Total	37	2290:55	18	16	3	109	1194	2	.916	2.85

== Rankings ==
Poll	Week																											
Poll	Pre	1	2	3	4	5	6	7	8	9	10	11	12	13	14	15	16	17	18	19	20	21	22	23	24	25	26	27 (Final)
USCHO.com	NR	NR	NR	NR	NR	NR	NR	NR	NR	NR	NR	NR	–	NR	NR	NR	NR	NR	NR	NR	NR	NR	NR	NR	NR	NR	–	NR
USA Hockey	NR	NR	NR	NR	NR	NR	NR	NR	NR	NR	NR	NR	–	NR	NR	NR	NR	NR	NR	NR	NR	NR	NR	NR	NR	NR	NR	NR

Note: USCHO did not release a poll in week 12 or 26.
Note: USA Hockey did not release a poll in week 12.

== Awards and honors ==
Player	Award	Ref
Trevor Hoskin	Atlantic Hockey America Rookie of the Year	
Trevor Hoskin	All-Atlantic Hockey America Second Team	
Jay Ahearn	All-Atlantic Hockey America Third Team	
Trevor Hoskin	Atlantic Hockey America All-Rookie Team	
