= 2024–25 Mercyhurst Lakers men's ice hockey season =

- Conference: 11th AHA
- Home ice: Mercyhurst Ice Center

Rankings
- USCHO: NR
- USA Hockey: NR

Record
- Overall: 4–27–4
- Conference: 4–19–3
- Home: 3–11–3
- Road: 1–16–1

Coaches and captains
- Head coach: Rick Gotkin
- Assistant coaches: Greg Gardner; Tom Peffall
- Captain: Jake Beaune
- Alternate captain(s): Mickey Burns; Ryan Coughlin

The 2024–25 Mercyhurst Lakers men's ice hockey season was the 38th season of play for the program, the 26th at the Division I level, and the 1st in Atlantic Hockey America. The Lakers represented Mercyhurst University in the 2024–25 NCAA Division I men's ice hockey season, played their home games at the Mercyhurst Ice Center and were coached by Rick Gotkin in his 37th season.

== Season ==
In just about every way, Mercyhurst had a horrible season. While the offense regressed and was one of the worst in the nation, averaging just over 2 goals per game, the team allowed more than 4 goals on average for the entire season. While the goaltenders didn't receive much help from the defense, they managed to post the worst goals against average in the nation and allow an NCAA-high of 150 for the year. Only one skater (Mickey Burns) reached 10 goals on the season and no Laker finished the year with a positive plus/minus rating. While the team's penalty kill was among the worst in the nation (61st out of 64 teams), the power play was middle-of-the-pack, converting on just under 20% of its opportunities. However, even with a decent man-advantage, Mercyhurst ended the year winning just 4 of its 35 games. That paltry sum set a new low for the program while the Lakers finished dead-last in the national rankings.

== Departures ==
| Player | Position | Nationality | Cause |
|---|---|---|---|
| Adrien Bisson | Defenseman | Canada | Graduation (signed with Florida Everblades) |
| Garrett Dahm | Forward | United States | Transferred to Clarkson |
| Tyler Gaulin | Forward | United States | Transferred to Endicott |
| Nicholas Kent | Defenseman | United States | Transferred to Hamilton |
| Matt Lenz | Goaltender | Canada | Graduate transfer to Albertus Magnus |
| Jackson McCarthy | Defenseman | United States | Transferred to Gustavus Adolphus |
| Marko Reifenberger | Forward | United States | Graduation (signed with South Carolina Stingrays) |
| Owen Say | Goaltender | Canada | Transferred to Notre Dame |
| Keanan Stewart | Forward | Canada | Graduation (signed with Cincinnati Cyclones) |
| Philip Waugh | Defenseman/Forward | United States | Signed professional contract (Wilkes-Barre/Scranton Penguins) |

== Recruiting ==
| Player | Position | Nationality | Age | Notes |
|---|---|---|---|---|
| Dominik Bartecko | Forward | Czech Republic | 20 | Prague, CZE |
| Michael Chambre | Goaltender | United States | 19 | Fort Myers, FL |
| Matteo Disipio | Forward | Canada | 21 | Nepean, ON |
| Riley Fitzgerald | Forward | United States | 21 | Wilmington, MA |
| Christian Kocsis | Forward | United States | 20 | Middletown, NJ |
| Brendan Lamb | Forward | United States | 20 | Battle Creek, MI |
| Carter McPhail | Goaltender | United States | 25 | Fenton, MI; graduate transfer from Miami |
| Kaden Muir | Defenseman | United States | 20 | Manchester, NH |
| Mateo Picozzi | Defenseman | United States | 21 | Morristown, NJ |
| Caleb Price | Defenseman | United States | 24 | Hooksett, NH; transfer from Lindenwood |

== Roster ==
As of August 21, 2024.

| No. | Nat. | Player | Class | Pos | Height | Weight | DoB | Hometown | Previous team | NHL rights |
|---|---|---|---|---|---|---|---|---|---|---|
| 1 | (United States) | Michael Chambre | Freshman | G | 6' 1" (1.85 m) | 170 lb (77 kg) | 2005-01-07 | Fort Myers, Florida | Sioux Falls Stampede (USHL) | — |
| 2 | (United States) | Mateo Picozzi | Freshman | D | 6' 0" (1.83 m) | 194 lb (88 kg) | 2003-04-29 | Morristown, New Jersey | Omaha Lancers (USHL) | — |
| 3 | (United States) | Jake Beaune (C) | Senior | D | 6' 3" (1.91 m) | 195 lb (88 kg) | 2000-06-13 | Livonia, Michigan | Lincoln Stars (USHL) | — |
| 4 | (Canada) | Jaryd Sych | Sophomore | D | 6' 2" (1.88 m) | 194 lb (88 kg) | 2003-02-10 | Airdrie, Alberta | Notre Dame Hounds (SJHL) | — |
| 5 | (United States) | Caleb Price | Senior | D | 5' 10" (1.78 m) | 170 lb (77 kg) | 2000-03-31 | Hooksett, New Hampshire | Lindenwood (NCAA) | — |
| 6 | (United States) | Trent Sambrook | Sophomore | D | 5' 9" (1.75 m) | 165 lb (75 kg) | 2002-01-03 | Winnipeg, Manitoba | Winkler Flyers (MJHL) | — |
| 7 | (United States) | Tyler DesRochers | Sophomore | D | 6' 0" (1.83 m) | 185 lb (84 kg) | 2003-04-02 | Howell, New Jersey | Johnstown Tomahawks (NAHL) | — |
| 8 | (United States) | Brendan Lamb | Freshman | F | 5' 11" (1.8 m) | 176 lb (80 kg) | 2004-05-14 | Battle Creek, Michigan | Madison Capitols (USHL) | — |
| 9 | (Canada) | Sean James | Sophomore | F | 6' 0" (1.83 m) | 161 lb (73 kg) | 2002-09-10 | Almonte, Ontario | Smiths Falls (CCHL) | — |
| 10 | (United States) | Steven Agriogianis | Graduate | F | 5' 9" (1.75 m) | 175 lb (79 kg) | 1999-01-07 | East Hanover, New Jersey | Northeastern (HEA) | — |
| 11 | (United States) | Barrett Brooks | Junior | F | 5' 8" (1.73 m) | 170 lb (77 kg) | 2001-12-19 | Stevens Point, Wisconsin | Western Michigan (NCHC) | — |
| 12 | (United States) | Dustin Geregach | Senior | D | 6' 0" (1.83 m) | 181 lb (82 kg) | 2001-11-14 | McKees Rocks, Pennsylvania | Johnstown Tomahawks (NAHL) | — |
| 14 | (United States) | Boris Skalos | Sophomore | F | 5' 11" (1.8 m) | 176 lb (80 kg) | 2003-01-06 | Clifton, New Jersey | Fargo Force (USHL) | — |
| 15 | (United States) | Tommy Bannister | Junior | F | 5' 9" (1.75 m) | 180 lb (82 kg) | 2001-09-05 | Clayton, New York | New Jersey Titans (NAHL) | — |
| 16 | (United States) | Ryan Coughlin (A) | Junior | F | 6' 0" (1.83 m) | 180 lb (82 kg) | 2001-02-09 | Charlotte, North Carolina | New Jersey Titans (NAHL) | — |
| 18 | (Canada) | Davis Fry | Sophomore | F | 6' 4" (1.93 m) | 194 lb (88 kg) | 2003-08-04 | Regina, Saskatchewan | Steinbach Pistons (MJHL) | — |
| 19 | (United States) | Riley Fitzgerald | Freshman | F | 5' 9" (1.75 m) | 161 lb (73 kg) | 2003-06-02 | Wilmington, Massachusetts | New Jersey Titans (NAHL) | — |
| 20 | (United States) | Kaden Muir | Freshman | D | 6' 2" (1.88 m) | 190 lb (86 kg) | 2004-05-09 | Manchester, New Hampshire | Austin Bruins (NAHL) | — |
| 21 | (United States) | Mickey Burns (A) | Graduate | F | 5' 9" (1.75 m) | 175 lb (79 kg) | 2000-04-03 | Wayne, New Jersey | Vermont (HEA) | — |
| 22 | (United States) | Kyler Head | Graduate | F | 6' 4" (1.93 m) | 215 lb (98 kg) | 1999-07-13 | Malone, New York | Robert Morris (AHA) | — |
| 23 | (United States) | Cameron Ricotta | Sophomore | F | 5' 8" (1.73 m) | 170 lb (77 kg) | 2002-05-17 | Cheektowaga, New York | Fairbanks Ice Dogs (NAHL) | — |
| 24 | (Canada) | Matteo Disipio | Freshman | F | 5' 11" (1.8 m) | 161 lb (73 kg) | 2003-07-26 | Nepean, Ontario | Rochester Jr. Americans (NAHL) | — |
| 26 | (Canada) | Spencer Smith | Sophomore | F | 5' 8" (1.73 m) | 174 lb (79 kg) | 2002-05-20 | St. Catharines, Ontario | Penticton Vees (BCHL) | — |
| 27 | (Czech Republic) | Dominik Bartecko | Freshman | F | 5' 9" (1.75 m) | 170 lb (77 kg) | 2003-12-09 | Prague, Czech Republic | New Jersey Titans (NAHL) | — |
| 28 | (United States) | Tyler Nasca | Junior | D | 5' 11" (1.8 m) | 160 lb (73 kg) | 2001-01-09 | Buffalo, New York | Lone Star Brahmas (NAHL) | — |
| 29 | (United States) | Christian Kocsis | Freshman | F | 5' 10" (1.78 m) | 170 lb (77 kg) | 2004-06-09 | Middletown, New Jersey | Omaha Lancers (USHL) | — |
| 33 | (United States) | Carter McPhail | Graduate | G | 5' 11" (1.8 m) | 178 lb (81 kg) | 1998-12-04 | Fenton, Michigan | Miami (NCHC) | — |
| 37 | (United States) | Connor Pelc | Sophomore | F | 6' 2" (1.88 m) | 194 lb (88 kg) | 2003-04-28 | Buffalo, New York | Sioux Falls Stampede (USHL) | — |
| 39 | (United States) | Will Margel | Senior | F | 5' 9" (1.75 m) | 165 lb (75 kg) | 2001-03-16 | Potomac, Maryland | New Hampshire (HEA) | — |
| 44 | (Canada) | Simon Bucheler | Sophomore | G | 6' 2" (1.88 m) | 188 lb (85 kg) | 2002-03-29 | Saint-Laurent, Quebec | Shreveport Mudbugs (NAHL) | — |

== Standings ==
2024–25 Atlantic Hockey America Standings
| | Conference record | | | | | | | | | | Overall record | | | | | |
| | GP | W | L | T | OW | OL | SW | PTS | GF | GA | GP | W | L | T | GF | GA |
|---|---|---|---|---|---|---|---|---|---|---|---|---|---|---|---|---|
| Holy Cross † | 26 | 19 | 5 | 2 | 4 | 0 | 1 | 56 | 92 | 47 | 40 | 24 | 14 | 2 | 130 | 94 |
| Sacred Heart | 26 | 16 | 7 | 3 | 1 | 1 | 2 | 53 | 80 | 64 | 39 | 21 | 13 | 5 | 118 | 101 |
| #19 Bentley * | 26 | 16 | 9 | 1 | 1 | 2 | 1 | 51 | 79 | 57 | 40 | 23 | 15 | 2 | 115 | 83 |
| Niagara | 26 | 15 | 9 | 2 | 3 | 3 | 1 | 48 | 90 | 70 | 37 | 18 | 16 | 3 | 124 | 109 |
| Army | 26 | 14 | 10 | 2 | 2 | 0 | 2 | 44 | 84 | 74 | 38 | 16 | 20 | 2 | 105 | 117 |
| Canisius | 26 | 11 | 13 | 2 | 0 | 3 | 0 | 38 | 84 | 79 | 37 | 12 | 23 | 2 | 98 | 120 |
| Air Force | 26 | 11 | 13 | 2 | 2 | 3 | 1 | 37 | 59 | 58 | 40 | 16 | 21 | 3 | 86 | 112 |
| American International | 26 | 9 | 16 | 1 | 0 | 3 | 0 | 31 | 63 | 77 | 38 | 13 | 23 | 2 | 92 | 117 |
| RIT | 26 | 9 | 15 | 2 | 2 | 0 | 1 | 28 | 65 | 102 | 35 | 10 | 23 | 2 | 82 | 133 |
| Robert Morris | 26 | 7 | 15 | 4 | 1 | 2 | 1 | 27 | 72 | 86 | 35 | 10 | 20 | 5 | 95 | 115 |
| Mercyhurst | 26 | 4 | 19 | 3 | 1 | 0 | 2 | 16 | 59 | 113 | 35 | 4 | 27 | 4 | 77 | 150 |
Championship: March 22, 2025 † indicates conference regular season champion (DeGregorio Trophy) * indicates conference tournament champion (Riley Trophy); Rankings: USCHO.com Top 20 Poll

== Schedule and results ==
| Date | Time | Opponent^{#} | Rank^{#} | Site | TV | Decision | Result | Attendance | Record |
Regular Season
| October 5 | 7:07 pm | Bowling Green* | | Mercyhurst Ice Center • Erie, Pennsylvania | FloHockey | Bucheler | L 1–2 | 1,156 | 0–1–0 |
| October 6 | 7:07 pm | Bowling Green* | | Mercyhurst Ice Center • Erie, Pennsylvania | FloHockey | McPhail | L 4–5 ^{OT} | 1,178 | 0–2–0 |
| October 11 | 7:00 pm | RIT | | Mercyhurst Ice Center • Erie, Pennsylvania | FloHockey | Bucheler | W 4–2 | 876 | 1–2–0 (1–0–0) |
| October 12 | 4:00 pm | RIT | | Mercyhurst Ice Center • Erie, Pennsylvania | FloHockey | Bucheler | L 2–4 | 939 | 1–3–0 (1–1–0) |
| October 18 | 7:00 pm | at Union* | | Achilles Rink • Schenectady, New York | ESPN+ | Bucheler | L 2–6 | 1,605 | 1–4–0 |
| October 19 | 5:00 pm | at Union* | | Achilles Rink • Schenectady, New York | ESPN+ | McPhail | L 2–3 | 1,983 | 1–5–0 |
| October 22 | 6:00 pm | at Canisius | | LECOM Harborcenter • Buffalo, New York | FloHockey | Bucheler | L 3–6 | 489 | 1–6–0 (1–2–0) |
| November 1 | 7:00 pm | at Niagara | | Dwyer Arena • Lewiston, New York | FloHockey | McPhail | L 3–5 | 807 | 1–7–0 (1–3–0) |
| November 2 | 7:00 pm | Niagara | | Mercyhurst Ice Center • Erie, Pennsylvania | FloHockey | Bucheler | W 3–4 ^{OT} | 891 | 2–7–0 (2–3–0) |
| November 4 | 7:00 pm | Robert Morris | | Mercyhurst Ice Center • Erie, Pennsylvania | FloHockey | Bucheler | L 2–5 | 1,122 | 2–8–0 (2–4–0) |
| November 8 | 7:00 pm | Sacred Heart | | Mercyhurst Ice Center • Erie, Pennsylvania | FloHockey | Bucheler | L 3–4 | 1,290 | 2–9–0 (2–5–0) |
| November 9 | 4:00 pm | Sacred Heart | | Mercyhurst Ice Center • Erie, Pennsylvania | FloHockey | Bucheler | L 1–4 | 1,362 | 2–10–0 (2–6–0) |
| November 15 | 10:00 pm | at Air Force | | Cadet Ice Arena • USAF Academy, Colorado | FloHockey | McPhail | L 0–1 | 2,176 | 2–11–0 (2–7–0) |
| November 16 | 10:00 pm | at Air Force | | Cadet Ice Arena • USAF Academy, Colorado | FloHockey | McPhail | L 1–4 | 2,137 | 2–12–0 (2–8–0) |
| November 22 | 7:00 pm | Canisius | | Mercyhurst Ice Center • Erie, Pennsylvania | FloHockey | McPhail | L 2–3 | 1,257 | 2–13–0 (2–9–0) |
| November 23 | 5:00 pm | Canisius | | Mercyhurst Ice Center • Erie, Pennsylvania | FloHockey | McPhail | T 3–3 ^{SOW} | 1,237 | 2–13–1 (2–9–1) |
| December 6 | 7:00 pm | Bentley | | Mercyhurst Ice Center • Erie, Pennsylvania | FloHockey | McPhail | L 2–4 | 1,189 | 2–14–1 (2–10–1) |
| December 7 | 5:00 pm | Bentley | | Mercyhurst Ice Center • Erie, Pennsylvania | FloHockey | McPhail | T 2–2 ^{SOL} | 1,172 | 2–14–2 (2–10–2) |
| December 14 | 7:00 pm | Rensselaer* | | Mercyhurst Ice Center • Erie, Pennsylvania | FloHockey | McPhail | T 3–3 ^{OT} | 1,021 | 2–14–3 |
| December 15 | 4:00 pm | Rensselaer* | | Mercyhurst Ice Center • Erie, Pennsylvania | FloHockey | Chambre | L 2–5 | 1,034 | 2–15–3 |
| January 3 | 8:00 pm | at #3 Minnesota* | | 3M Arena at Mariucci • Minneapolis, Minnesota | Fox 9+ | McPhail | L 2–6 | 10,019 | 2–16–3 |
| January 4 | 6:00 pm | at #3 Minnesota* | | 3M Arena at Mariucci • Minneapolis, Minnesota | Fox 9+ | Chambre | L 2–5 | 10,201 | 2–17–3 |
| January 10 | 7:00 pm | at Army | | Tate Rink • West Point, New York | FloHockey | McPhail | L 1–9 | 1,754 | 2–18–3 (2–11–2) |
| January 11 | 7:00 pm | at Army | | Tate Rink • West Point, New York | FloHockey | Bucheler | L 1–13 | 1,682 | 2–19–3 (2–12–2) |
| January 17 | 7:00 pm | Niagara | | Mercyhurst Ice Center • Erie, Pennsylvania | FloHockey | McPhail | W 5–1 | 1,238 | 3–19–3 (3–12–2) |
| January 18 | 7:00 pm | at Niagara | | Dwyer Arena • Lewiston, New York | FloHockey | McPhail | L 3–6 | 551 | 3–20–3 (3–13–2) |
| January 31 | 7:00 pm | at Robert Morris | | Clearview Arena • Neville Township, Pennsylvania | FloHockey | McPhail | W 4–2 | 787 | 4–20–3 (4–13–2) |
| February 1 | 7:00 pm | at Robert Morris | | Clearview Arena • Neville Township, Pennsylvania | FloHockey | Chambre | T 3–3 ^{SOW} | 786 | 4–20–4 (4–13–3) |
| February 7 | 7:00 pm | American International | | Mercyhurst Ice Center • Erie, Pennsylvania | FloHockey | Chambre | L 0–5 | 1,286 | 4–21–4 (4–14–3) |
| February 8 | 4:00 pm | American International | | Mercyhurst Ice Center • Erie, Pennsylvania | FloHockey | McPhail | L 1–4 | 1,307 | 4–22–4 (4–15–3) |
| February 14 | 6:00 pm | at Holy Cross | | Hart Center • Worcester, Massachusetts | FloHockey, NESN+ | McPhail | L 1–4 | 693 | 4–23–4 (4–16–3) |
| February 15 | 6:00 pm | at Holy Cross | | Hart Center • Worcester, Massachusetts | FloHockey | Chambre | L 3–7 | 742 | 4–24–4 (4–17–3) |
| February 21 | 7:05 pm | at RIT | | Gene Polisseni Center • Henrietta, New York | FloHockey | McPhail | L 2–3 | 3,045 | 4–25–4 (4–18–3) |
| February 22 | 5:05 pm | at RIT | | Gene Polisseni Center • Henrietta, New York | FloHockey | Bucheler | L 3–6 | 3,138 | 4–26–4 (4–19–3) |
Atlantic Hockey America Tournament
| March 1 | 5:00 pm | at Canisius* | | LECOM Harborcenter • Buffalo, New York (AHA First Round) | FloHockey | McPhail | L 0–2 | 293 | 4–27–4 |
*Non-conference game. ^{#}Rankings from USCHO.com Poll. All times are in Eastern Time. Source:

== Scoring statistics ==
| Name | Position | Games | Goals | Assists | Points | PIM |
|---|---|---|---|---|---|---|
| Mickey Burns | LW | 32 | 10 | 11 | 21 | 23 |
| Steven Agriogianis | RW | 34 | 8 | 13 | 21 | 8 |
| Dustin Geregach | D | 35 | 7 | 14 | 21 | 10 |
| Ryan Coughlin | F | 35 | 5 | 10 | 15 | 12 |
| Riley Fitzgerald | F | 33 | 7 | 7 | 14 | 6 |
| Boris Skalos | F | 34 | 5 | 9 | 14 | 12 |
| Will Margel | C/W | 24 | 6 | 6 | 12 | 16 |
| Dominik Bartecko | F | 31 | 6 | 6 | 12 | 2 |
| Sean James | LW | 34 | 3 | 8 | 11 | 10 |
| Trent Sambrook | D | 35 | 0 | 11 | 11 | 18 |
| Brendan Lamb | F | 33 | 2 | 8 | 10 | 4 |
| Tyler DesRochers | D | 27 | 5 | 3 | 8 | 16 |
| Barrett Brooks | RW | 26 | 2 | 6 | 8 | 2 |
| Connor Pelc | RW | 28 | 2 | 5 | 7 | 29 |
| Caleb Price | D | 24 | 0 | 7 | 7 | 0 |
| Matteo Disipio | RW | 16 | 3 | 3 | 6 | 2 |
| Tyler Nasca | D | 31 | 1 | 3 | 4 | 4 |
| Spencer Smith | C | 32 | 1 | 3 | 4 | 6 |
| Jake Beaune | D | 26 | 1 | 2 | 3 | 36 |
| Jaryd Sych | D | 30 | 2 | 0 | 2 | 12 |
| Christian Kocsis | LW | 25 | 0 | 2 | 2 | 10 |
| Davis Fry | F | 11 | 1 | 0 | 1 | 4 |
| Kaden Muir | D | 21 | 0 | 1 | 1 | 16 |
| Cameron Ricotta | LW | 2 | 0 | 0 | 0 | 0 |
| Michael Chambre | G | 6 | 0 | 0 | 0 | 0 |
| Kyler Head | F | 6 | 0 | 0 | 0 | 6 |
| Simon Bucheler | G | 11 | 0 | 0 | 0 | 2 |
| Carter McPhail | G | 22 | 0 | 0 | 0 | 4 |
| Total | | | 77 | 138 | 215 | 284 |

== Goaltending statistics ==
| Name | Games | Minutes | Wins | Losses | Ties | Goals against | Saves | Shut-outs | SV % | GAA |
|---|---|---|---|---|---|---|---|---|---|---|
| Carter McPhail | 22 | 1168:12 | 2 | 14 | 3 | 67 | 680 | 0 | .910 | 3.44 |
| Michael Chambre | 6 | 304:06 | 0 | 4 | 1 | 22 | 186 | 0 | .894 | 4.34 |
| Simon Bucheler | 11 | 625:26 | 2 | 9 | 0 | 46 | 328 | 0 | .877 | 4.44 |
| Empty Net | - | 25:18 | - | - | - | 15 | - | - | - | - |
| Total | 35 | 2123:02 | 4 | 27 | 4 | 150 | 1194 | 0 | .888 | 4.24 |

== Rankings ==
| Poll | Week | | | | | | | | | | | | | | | | | | | | | | | | | | | |
| Poll | Pre | 1 | 2 | 3 | 4 | 5 | 6 | 7 | 8 | 9 | 10 | 11 | 12 | 13 | 14 | 15 | 16 | 17 | 18 | 19 | 20 | 21 | 22 | 23 | 24 | 25 | 26 | 27 (Final) |
|---|---|---|---|---|---|---|---|---|---|---|---|---|---|---|---|---|---|---|---|---|---|---|---|---|---|---|---|---|
| USCHO.com | NR | NR | NR | NR | NR | NR | NR | NR | NR | NR | NR | NR | – | NR | NR | NR | NR | NR | NR | NR | NR | NR | NR | NR | NR | NR | – | NR |
| USA Hockey | NR | NR | NR | NR | NR | NR | NR | NR | NR | NR | NR | NR | – | NR | NR | NR | NR | NR | NR | NR | NR | NR | NR | NR | NR | NR | NR | NR |

Note: USCHO did not release a poll in week 12 or 26.
Note: USA Hockey did not release a poll in week 12.
