= Liam McLinskey =

American ice hockey player (born 2001)

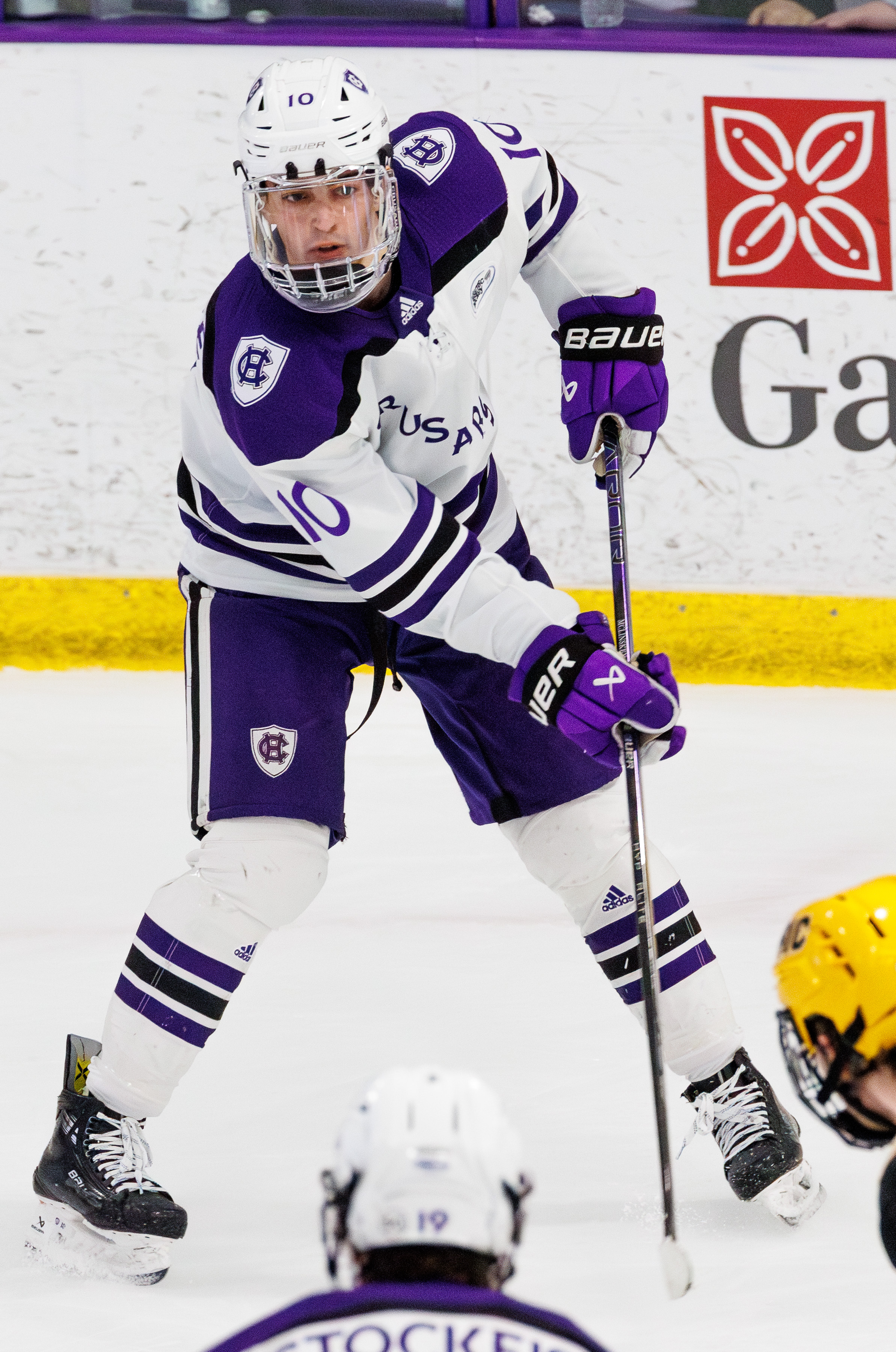
- McLinskey in 2024
- Born: February 20, 2001 (age 25) Pearl River, New York, U.S.
- Height: 6 ft 3 in (191 cm)
- Weight: 180 lb (82 kg; 12 st 12 lb)
- Position: Right wing
- Shoots: Right
- AHL team: Charlotte Checkers
- NHL draft: Undrafted
- Playing career: 2025–present

Liam McLinskey (born February 20, 2001) is an American professional ice hockey winger for the Charlotte Checkers in the American Hockey League (AHL). He previously played collegiate hockey with Holy Cross of the National Collegiate Athletic Association (NCAA).

== Playing career ==
McLinskey began his collegiate career for Quinnipiac during the 2021–22 season. During his freshman year he was scoreless in two games. Following the season he transferred to Holy Cross.

During the 2022–23 season, his sophomore year, he recorded 21 goals and four assists in 40 games. His 21 goals led the team, and tied for second all-time for goals in a single season at Holy Cross. He also set a program record with six game-winning goals. During the 2023 Atlantic Hockey tournament, he recorded nine goals, setting an Atlantic Hockey tournament record. He helped the Crusaders reach the championship game for the first time since 2006. He was subsequently named to the Atlantic Hockey All-Tournament Team.

During the 2023–24 season, In his junior year, he recorded 19 goals and 28 assists in 39 games. He led the team and Atlantic Hockey in points, assists, and plus/minus. His 47 points are tied for second-most all-time, while his 19 goals and 28 assists are each tied for the fourth-most in a single season in program history. With four goals in the 2024 Atlantic Hockey tournament, McLinskey tied the all-time Atlantic Hockey Tournament record with 14 goals in the postseason. Following the season he was named Atlantic Hockey Player of the Year, won the Atlantic Hockey Regular Season Scoring Trophy and was named to the All-Atlantic Hockey First Team. He was also named an AHCA East Second Team All-American, and a top-ten finalist for the Hobey Baker Award. He became the first Crusader player to be named a finalist for the award.

During the 2024–25 season, In his senior year, he recorded 24 goals and 30 assists in 40 games. He led the team and Atlantic Hockey America in scoring. Following the season he was named Atlantic Hockey America Player of the Year, and Atlantic Hockey America Forward of the Year, won the Atlantic Hockey America scoring trophy and was named to the All-Atlantic Hockey America First Team. He was also named a top-ten finalist for the Hobey Baker Award for the second consecutive year.

== Personal life ==
McLinskey was born to Terence and Laura McLinskey and has two siblings, Ryan and Grace. His father played soccer at Army West Point and his brother, Ryan, played college baseball at Seton Hall and Notre Dame. His cousin Drew Fortescue plays college hockey for Boston College and was drafted by the New York Rangers.

== Career statistics ==
			Regular season					Playoffs
Season	Team	League	GP	G	A	Pts	PIM	GP	G	A	Pts	PIM
2019–20	Jersey Hitmen	NCDC	50	12	40	52	78	—	—	—	—	—
2020–21	Jersey Hitmen	NCDC	44	24	43	67	38	4	0	3	3	2
2021–22	Quinnipiac University	ECAC	2	0	0	0	0	—	—	—	—	—
2022–23	Holy Cross	AHA	40	21	4	25	22	—	—	—	—	—
2023–24	Holy Cross	AHA	39	19	28	47	32	—	—	—	—	—
2024–25	Holy Cross	AHA	40	24	30	54	18	—	—	—	—	—
2024–25	Charlotte Checkers	AHL	6	1	4	5	0	—	—	—	—	—
2025–26	Charlotte Checkers	AHL	24	2	3	5	8	—	—	—	—	—
AHL totals			30	3	7	10	8	—	—	—	—	—

== Awards and honors ==
Award	Year
College
Atlantic Hockey All-Tournament Team	2023
All-Atlantic Hockey First Team	2024
Atlantic Hockey Player of the Year	2024
Atlantic Hockey Regular Season Scoring Trophy	2024
AHCA East Second Team All-American	2024, 2025
All-Atlantic Hockey America First Team	2025
Atlantic Hockey America Player of the Year	2025
Atlantic Hockey America Forward of the Year	2025

Awards and achievements
Preceded by Eric Esposito	Atlantic Hockey Regular Season Scoring Trophy; 2023–24	Succeeded by Award discontinued
Preceded by Carter Wilkie	Atlantic Hockey Player of the Year; 2023–24	Succeeded by Award discontinued
Preceded by Inaugural	Atlantic Hockey America Player of the Year; 2024–25	Succeeded by Félix Trudeau
Preceded by Inaugural	Atlantic Hockey America Forward of the Year; 2024–25	Succeeded by Félix Trudeau
