= Atlantic Hockey America men's Most Outstanding Player in Tournament =

Atlantic Hockey Most Valuable Player in Tournament
- Sport: Ice hockey
- Awarded for: The Most Valuable Player in the Atlantic Hockey Conference Tournament

History
- First award: 2025
- Most recent: Michael Mesic

The Atlantic Hockey America Most Outstanding Player in Tournament is an annual award given out at the conclusion of the Atlantic Hockey America conference tournament to the most outstanding player in the championship as voted by the coaches of each member team.

== Award winners ==
Year	Winner	Position	School	Ref
2025	Connor Hasley	Goaltender	Bentley	
2026	Michael Mesic	Centre	Bentley	

=== Winners by school ===
School	Winners
Bentley	2

=== Winners by position ===
Position	Winners
Centre	1
Goaltender	1

== See also ==
- Atlantic Hockey Most Valuable Player in Tournament
- MAAC Tournament Most Valuable Player
