= Atlantic Hockey America men's Best Defensive Forward =

Atlantic Hockey America Best Defensive Forward
- Sport: Ice hockey
- Awarded for: The Best Defensive Forward in Atlantic Hockey America

History
- First award: 2025
- Most recent: Kellan Hjartarson

The Atlantic Hockey America Best Defensive Forward is an annual award given out at the conclusion of the Atlantic Hockey America regular season to the best defensive forward in the conference.

The Best Defensive Forward was first awarded in 2025, and is a successor to the Atlantic Hockey Best Defensive Forward, which was discontinued after the conference merged with the women-only College Hockey America.

== Award winners ==
Year	Winner	Position	School	Ref
2024–25	Austin Schwartz	Forward	Air Force	
2024–25	Ethan Leyh	Forward	Bentley	
2025–26	Kellan Hjartarson	Forward	Bentley	

=== Winners by school ===
School	Winners
Bentley	2
Air Force	1

=== Winners by position ===
Position	Winners
Forward	3

== See also ==
- Atlantic Hockey Best Defensive Forward
