= Atlantic Hockey America men's Forward of the Year =

Atlantic Hockey America Forward of the Year
- Sport: Ice hockey
- Awarded for: The Forward of the Year in Atlantic Hockey America

History
- First award: 2025
- Most recent: Félix Trudeau

The Atlantic Hockey America Forward of the Year is an annual award given out at the conclusion of the Atlantic Hockey America regular season to the best forward in the conference.

The Forward of the Year was first awarded in 2025, and formed after the merger between the men-only Atlantic Hockey with the women-only College Hockey America.

== Award winners ==
Year	Winner	Position	School	Ref
2024–25	Liam McLinskey	Right Wing	Holy Cross	
2025–26	Félix Trudeau	Left Wing	Sacred Heart	

=== Winners by school ===
School	Winners
Holy Cross	1
Sacred Heart	1

=== Winners by position ===
Position	Winners
Left Wing	1
Right Wing	1
