= Atlantic Hockey America men's Goaltender of the Year =

Atlantic Hockey America Goaltender of the Year
- Sport: Ice hockey
- Awarded for: The Goaltender of the Year in Atlantic Hockey America

History
- First award: 2025
- Most recent: J. J. Cataldo

The Atlantic Hockey America Goaltender of the Year is an annual award given out at the conclusion of the Atlantic Hockey America regular season to the best goaltender in the conference.

The Goaltender of the Year was first awarded in 2025, and is a successor to the Atlantic Hockey Goaltender of the Year, which was discontinued after the conference merged with the women-only College Hockey America.

== Award winners ==
Year	Winner	School	Ref
2024–25	Thomas Gale	Holy Cross	
2025–26	J. J. Cataldo	Army	

=== Winners by school ===
School	Winners
Army	1
Holy Cross	1

== See also ==
- Atlantic Hockey Goaltender of the Year
