= Atlantic Hockey America men's Player of the Year =

Atlantic Hockey America Player of the Year
- Sport: Ice hockey
- Awarded for: The Player of the Year in Atlantic Hockey America

History
- First award: 2025
- Most recent: Félix Trudeau

The Atlantic Hockey America Player of the Year is an annual award given out at the conclusion of the Atlantic Hockey America regular season to the best player in the conference.

The Player of the Year was first awarded in 2025 and is a successor to the Atlantic Hockey Player of the Year, which was discontinued after the conference merged with the women-only College Hockey America.

== Award winners ==
Year	Winner	Position	School	Ref
2024–25	Liam McLinskey	Right Wing	Holy Cross	
2025–26	Félix Trudeau	Left Wing	Sacred Heart	

=== Winners by school ===
School	Winners
Holy Cross	1
Sacred Heart	1

=== Winners by position ===
Position	Winners
Left Wing	1
Right Wing	1

== See also ==
- Atlantic Hockey Player of the Year
