= Atlantic Hockey America men's Rookie of the Year =

Atlantic Hockey America Rookie of the Year
- Sport: Ice hockey
- Awarded for: The Rookie of the Year in Atlantic Hockey America

History
- First award: 2025
- Most recent: Zach Wigle

The Atlantic Hockey America Rookie of the Year is an annual award given out at the conclusion of the Atlantic Hockey America regular season to the best rookie in the conference.

The Rookie of the Year was first awarded in 2025, and is a successor to the Atlantic Hockey Rookie of the Year, which was discontinued after the conference merged with the women-only College Hockey America.

== Award winners ==
Year	Winner	Position	School	Ref
2024–25	Trevor Hoskin	Forward	Niagara	
2025–26	Zach Wigle	Center/Left Wing	RIT	

=== Winners by school ===
School	Winners
Niagara	1
RIT	1

=== Winners by position ===
Position	Winners
Center	1
Forward	1
Left Wing	1
