= Atlantic Hockey America =

NCAA Division I ice hockey conference

- Formerly: MAAC (Men) (1997–2003); Atlantic Hockey (Men) (2003–24); College Hockey America (Women) (2002–24)
- Association: NCAA
- Founded: Men: 1997 (as MAAC); Women: 2002 (as CHA)
- First season: 2024–25
- Commissioner: Michelle Morgan (since 2024)
- Sports fielded: Ice hockey
- Division: Division I
- No. of teams: 9: Men's; 7: Women's
- Headquarters: Boston, Massachusetts
- Region: Northeastern United States, Colorado and Missouri
- Website: atlantichockeyonline.com

Locations

Atlantic Hockey America (AHA) is a college ice hockey conference which operates primarily in the northeastern United States. It participates in NCAA Division I as an ice hockey-only conference. The conference was formed in 2023 by the merger of the men-only Atlantic Hockey Association and the women-only College Hockey America (CHA).

== History ==
In 2010, the men's division of CHA collapsed and two of the remaining teams joined the Atlantic Hockey Association. At that time, the two leagues began working together by sharing a commissioner and administrative staff in order to streamline their operating costs. The arrangement worked well enough that by 2023, the two entities decided to formalize their relationship and announced that they were merging. The new league began with the 2024–25 season and welcomed a new women's member, Delaware, in 2025. However, the number of men's members was reduced by one in the same year as AIC dropped its program to the Division II level, opting to place its hockey program in its all-sports conference of the NE-10. A little over a year later, Mercyhurst announced that it was discontinuing its men's program but would continue to support its women's team.

== Membership ==
Two schools, RIT and Robert Morris, have programs in both the men's and women's divisions. Holy Cross, Lindenwood, Penn State and Sacred Heart each operate teams of both genders, but only one is a member of AHA. Mercyhurst, Niagara and Syracuse only have one varsity program active as of 2026 but each previously supported the other gender.

=== Current ===
Institution	Location	Nickname	Founded	Affiliation	Enrollment	Joined	Men's	Women's	Primary Conference	Colors
United States Air Force Academy	USAF Academy, Colorado (Note: The Academy grounds lie almost entirely outside the Colorado Springs city limits. The U.S. Postal Service and U.S. Census Bureau respectively treat the Academy as "USAF Academy" and "Air Force Academy".)	Falcons	1954	Public/Federal	4,400	2024	check	X mark	Mountain West	
United States Military Academy	West Point, New York	Black Knights	1802	Public/Federal	4,400	2024	check	X mark	Patriot League	
Bentley University	Waltham, Massachusetts	Falcons	1917	Private/Secular	3,958	2024	check	X mark	Northeast-10 (D-II)	
Canisius University	Buffalo, New York	Golden Griffins	1870	Private/Catholic	3,490	2024	check	X mark	Metro	
University of Delaware	Newark, Delaware	Fightin' Blue Hens	1743	Public (Note: Delaware is legally chartered as a "privately governed, state-assisted" institution. This status is broadly similar to that of New York's statutory colleges, mostly housed at Cornell University, or institutions in Pennsylvania's Commonwealth System of Higher Education.)	23,281	2025	X mark	check	CUSA	
College of the Holy Cross	Worcester, Massachusetts	Crusaders	1843	Private/Catholic	2,897	2024	check	Hockey East	Patriot League	
Lindenwood University	St. Charles, Missouri	Lions	1827	Private/Presbyterian	12,213	2024	Independent	check	OVC	
Mercyhurst University	Erie, Pennsylvania	Lakers	1926	Private/Catholic	4,055	2024	X mark	check	NEC	
Niagara University	Lewiston, New York (Note: The campus mailing address is "Niagara University".)	Purple Eagles	1856	Private/Catholic	3,853	2024	check	X mark	Metro	
Pennsylvania State University	University Park, Pennsylvania (Note: The entire Penn State campus is designated by the U.S. Postal Service as "University Park". It straddles the boundary between State College and College Township. Penn State's hockey arena is physically in College Township.)	Nittany Lions	1855	Public/State-related	44,817	2024	Big Ten	check	Big Ten	
Robert Morris University	Moon Township, Pennsylvania	Colonials	1921	Private/Secular	4,005	2024	check	check	Horizon	
Rochester Institute of Technology	Henrietta, New York	Tigers	1829	Private/Secular	16,842	2024	check	check	Liberty League (D-III)	
Sacred Heart University	Fairfield, Connecticut	Pioneers	1963	Private/Catholic	5,428	2024	check	NEWHA	Metro	
Syracuse University	Syracuse, New York	Orange	1870	Private/Secular	19,082	2024	X mark	check	ACC	

=== Former ===
Institution	Location	Nickname	Founded	Affiliation	Enrollment	Joined	Left	Men's	Women's	Current Conference	Colors
American International College	Springfield, Massachusetts	Yellow Jackets	1885	Private/Secular	1,700	2024	2025	check	X mark	Northeast-10	
Mercyhurst University	Erie, Pennsylvania	Lakers	1926	Private/Catholic	4,055	2024	2026	check	X mark	None	

Atlantic Hockey America
Current AHA members:
Men's only
Men's and Women's
Women's only

=== Timeline ===
Men Women Both

== Champions ==
=== Men's ===
Season	Tournament	Regular Season Champion	Tournament Champion	Notes
2024–25	2025	Holy Cross (1)	Bentley (1)	Atlantic Hockey America men's division founded by Air Force, American International, Army, Bentley, Canisius, Holy Cross, Mercyhurst, Niagara, Robert Morris, RIT, and Sacred Heart. Final AHA season for American International (left for the NE-10).
2025–26	2026	Bentley (1)	Bentley (2)	Final AHA season for Mercyhurst (discontinued).

=== Women's ===
Season	Tournament	Regular Season Champion	Tournament Champion	Notes
2024–25	2025	Penn State (1)	Penn State (1)	Atlantic Hockey America women's division founded by Lindenwood, Mercyhurst, Penn State, Robert Morris, RIT, and Syracuse.
2025–26	2026	Penn State (2)	Penn State (2)	First season for Delaware

== Atlantic Hockey America tournament champions by school ==
=== Men's ===
School	Championship years
Bentley	2025, 2026

=== Women's ===
School	Championship years
Penn State	2025, 2026

== National tournament history ==
=== Men's ===
NCAA tournament
Year	AHA Rep.	Opponent	Result
2025	Bentley	Boston College	L 1–3
2026	Bentley	Michigan	L 1–5

=== Women's ===
NCAA tournament
Year	AHA Rep.	Opponent	Result
2025	Penn State	St. Lawrence	L 1–4
2026	Penn State	UConn	W 3–0
2026	Penn State	Wisconsin	L 4–3 (OT)

== Conference arenas ==
=== Men's ===
School	Hockey Arena	Location	Capacity
Air Force	Cadet Ice Arena	USAF Academy, CO	2,502
Army	Tate Rink	West Point, NY	2,648
Bentley	Bentley Arena	Waltham, MA	1,917
Canisius	LECOM Harborcenter	Buffalo, NY	1,800
Holy Cross	Hart Center	Worcester, MA	1,600
Niagara	Dwyer Arena	Lewiston, NY	1,400
RIT	Gene Polisseni Center; Blue Cross Arena (alternate)	Henrietta, NY; Rochester, NY	4,300; 10,556
Robert Morris	Clearview Arena	Neville Township, PA	1,200
Sacred Heart	Martire Family Arena	Fairfield, CT	3,600

=== Women's ===
School	Hockey Arena	Location	Capacity
Delaware	Fred Rust Ice Arena	Newark, DE	2,500
Lindenwood	Centene Community Ice Center	Maryland Heights, MO	2,500
Mercyhurst	Mercyhurst Ice Center	Erie, PA	1,500
Penn State	Pegula Ice Arena	University Park, PA	6,000
RIT	Gene Polisseni Center	Henrietta, NY	4,300
Robert Morris	Clearview Arena	Neville Township, PA	1,200
Syracuse	Tennity Ice Skating Pavilion	Syracuse, NY	350

== Awards ==
=== Men's ===
==== All-Conference teams ====
Award	Inaugural year
First Team	2024–25
Second Team	2024–25
Third Team	2024–25
Rookie Team	2024–25

==== Individual awards ====
Award	Inaugural year
Player of the Year	2024–25
Forward of the Year	2024–25
Goaltender of the Year	2024–25
Rookie of the Year	2024–25
Coach of the Year	2024–25
Best Defenseman	2024–25
Best Defensive Forward	2024–25
Individual Sportsmanship Award	2024–25
Most Outstanding Player in Tournament	2024–25

== See also ==
- Atlantic Hockey
- College Hockey America
- MAAC Awards
