= 2017 Atlantic Hockey men's ice hockey tournament =

Men's ice hockey tournament on March 3-8, 2017

2017 Atlantic Hockey Men's ice hockey tournament
- Dates: March 3–18, 2017
- Teams: 11
- Finals site: Blue Cross Arena; Rochester, New York
- Champions: Air Force (6th title)
- Winning coach: Frank Serratore (6th title)
- MVP: Shane Starrett (Air Force)
- Atlantic Hockey Men's Ice Hockey Tournaments

The 2017 Atlantic Hockey Tournament is the 13th Atlantic Hockey Tournament. It was played between March 3 and March 18, 2017 at home campus locations and at the Blue Cross Arena in Rochester, New York. The tournament champion Air Force was granted Atlantic Hockey's automatic bid to the 2017 NCAA Division I Men's Ice Hockey Tournament.

== Format ==
The tournament features four rounds of play. In the first round the sixth and eleventh, seventh and tenth, and eighth and ninth seeds, as determined by the conference regular season standings, will play a best-of-three series with the winners advancing to the quarterfinals. The top five teams from the conference regular season standings receive a bye to the quarterfinals. There, the first seed and lowest-ranked first round winner, the second seed and second-highest-ranked first round winner, the third seed and highest-ranked first round winner, and the fourth seed and the fifth seed will play a best-of-three series, with the winners advancing to the semifinals. In the semifinals, the highest and lowest seeds and second-highest and second-lowest remaining seeds will play a single game each, with the winners advancing to the championship game. The tournament champion will receive an automatic bid to the 2017 NCAA Division I Men's Ice Hockey Tournament.

=== Standings ===
Note: GP = Games played; W = Wins; L = Losses; T = Ties; PTS = Points; GF = Goals For; GA = Goals Against

2016–17 Atlantic Hockey standings
	Conference record							Overall record					
	GP	W	L	T	PTS	GF	GA	GP	W	L	T	GF	GA
Canisius†	28	18	4	6	42	90	53	39	21	11	7	107	85
#12 Air Force*	28	19	6	3	41	91	56	42	27	10	5	133	93
Army	28	15	10	3	33	77	56	37	18	14	5	100	78
Robert Morris	28	15	10	3	33	86	73	38	22	12	4	123	95
Holy Cross	28	11	10	7	29	78	78	36	14	15	7	99	106
RIT	28	13	15	0	26	90	79	37	14	22	1	108	111
Mercyhurst	28	11	13	4	26	82	83	39	15	20	4	106	123
Bentley	28	10	12	6	26	78	82	39	13	19	7	101	120
Sacred Heart	28	10	15	3	23	67	87	37	13	19	5	88	116
American International	28	7	14	7	21	63	91	36	8	20	8	82	122
Niagara	28	3	23	2	8	55	119	39	5	31	3	76	168
Championship: March 18, 2017 † indicates conference regular season champion; * indicates conference tournament champion Rankings: USCHO.com Top 20 Poll; updated March 6, 2017

== Bracket ==
Army and Robert Morris finished tied for third. Army wins the 5th tiebreaker (record against #1 seed). RIT, Mercyhurst and Bentley finished tied for sixth place. RIT was seeded sixth with tie breakers over both (head-to-head wins and conference wins) while Mercyhurst was placed seventh (conference wins).

First round March 3–5
6	RIT	4	5	1
11	Niagara	5	0	4
7	Mercyhurst	4	5	–
10	American International	3	0	–
8	Bentley	1	5	3**
9	Sacred Heart	4	2	2

Quarterfinals; March 10–12
1	Canisius	3	2	–
11	Niagara	0	1	–
2	Air Force	4	2	—
8	Bentley	0	1	—
3	Army	6	2	4
7	Mercyhurst	4	3*	3
4	Robert Morris	6	3	—
5	Holy Cross	3	2	—

Semifinals; March 17
1	Canisius	2
4	Robert Morris	6
2	Air Force	1
3	Army	0

Championship; March 18
4	Robert Morris	1
2	Air Force	2

Note: * denotes overtime period(s)

== Results ==
=== First round ===
==== (6) RIT vs. (11) Niagara ====
March 3	RIT	4 – 5	Niagara	Gene Polisseni Center	Recap
(Logan, Mikowski) Jordan Peacock – 11:15 (Brubacher, Abt) Danny Smith – 14:48 (Abt, Valenzuela) Liam Kerins – 18:10		First period	15:25 – Kris Spriggs (Kovachis, Cakebread)
No scoring		Second period	04:08 – EA – Stephen Pietrobon (Harper, Spriggs)
(Abt, Rotolo) Erik Brown – 10:25		Third period	16:05 – SH – Vinny Muto (Curran); 19:03 – EA – Johnny Curran (Rennaker, Sarcona); 19:49 – GW SH – Sam Rennaker (unassisted)
( 17 saves / 22 shots ) Mike Rotolo		Goalie stats	Jackson Teichroeb ( 35 saves / 39 shots )

March 4	RIT	5 – 0	Niagara	Gene Polisseni Center
(unassisted) Myles Powell – GW SH – 06:15 (Cameron, Abt) Ryan Kruper – 13:25 (Kruper) Darren Brady – 19:42		First period	No scoring
No scoring		Second period	No scoring
(Girduckis, Brubacker) Danny Smith – 03:27 (Powell, Brubacher) Matt Abt – PP – 11:44		Third period	No scoring
( 19 saves / 19 shots ) Mike Rotolo		Goalie stats	Jackson Teichroeb ( 27 saves / 31 shots ) / Joe O'Brien ( 7 saves / 8 shots )

March 5	RIT	1 – 4	Niagara	Gene Polisseni Center
No scoring		First period	01:00 – Kris Spriggs (Pietrobon, Muto); 03:49 – GW – Sam Rennaker (Curran, Dzakhov)
(Logan) Jordan Peacock – 05:00		Second period	No scoring
No scoring		Third period	05:10 – PP – Stanislav Dzakhov (Delman, Boman); 16:56 – EN – Stanislav Dzakhov (Harper, Teichroeb)
( 15 saves / 18 shots ) Mike Rotolo		Goalie stats	Jackson Teichroeb ( 42 saves / 43 shots )

Niagara won series 2–1

==== (7) Mercyhurst vs. (10) American International ====
March 3	Mercyhurst	4 – 3	American International	Mercyhurst Ice Center
(Duszak, Riley) Derek Barach – 03:27 (Dsuzak, Wu) Taylor Best – PP – 12:14 (Baker, Lancaster) Michael Verboom – 17:24		First period	18:20 – PP – Martin Mellberg (Christensen, Mueller)
(Enns, Charbonneau) Derek Barach – GW – 16:32		Second period	05:08 – Kyle Stephan (Christian, Demel); 06:00 – Hugo Reinhardt (Orszulak, Florian)
No scoring		Third period	No scoring
( 29 saves / 32 shots ) Brandon Wildung		Goalie stats	Zackarais Skog ( 31 saves / 35 shots )

March 4	Mercyhurst	5 – 0	American International	Mercyhurst Ice Center
No scoring		First period	No scoring
(Enns, Piacentini) Stephen Hrehoriak – GW – 09:00 (Lancaster, Best) Derek Barach – PP – 11:19 (Barach, Lancaster) Jonathan Charbonneau – 13:30 (Drouin, Barach) Jack Riley – PP – 17:41		Second period	No scoring
(Lammon, Whittaker) Joseph Duszak – 01:08		Third period	No scoring
( 24 saves / 24 shots ) Brandon Wildung		Goalie stats	Zackarais Skog ( 29 saves / 34 shots )

Mercyhurst won series 2–0

==== (8) Bentley vs. (9) Sacred Heart ====
March 3	Bentley	1 – 4	Sacred Heart	John A. Ryan Arena
(Riggleman, Callin) Alexey Soloyev – 10:46		First period	No scoring
No scoring		Second period	No scoring
No scoring		Third period	02:13 – Mike Crocock (McIlmurray, De Concilys); 10:15 – GW – Vito Bavaro (Jasper, Tsekos); 17:23 – Justin Danforth (Hladin, Nylen); 19:16 – EN – Stephen Hladin (Minello, Danforth)
( 29 saves / 32 shots ) Aiden Pelino		Goalie stats	Brett Magnus ( 29 saves / 30 shots )

March 4	Bentley	5 – 2	Sacred Heart	John A. Ryan Arena	Recap
No scoring		First period	17:01 – Vito Bavaro (Tsekos)
(Desbiens, Gorowsky) Max French – 06:39 (French) Chris Buchanan – 07:48		Second period	No scoring
(McMurphy, McDonald) Kyle Schmidt – GW – 11:28 (Schmidt, Gorowsky) Max French – 18:13 (unassisted) Max French – EN – 19:29		Third period	02:13 – Jeff Caroll (McIlmurray, Doerksen)
( 30 saves / 32 shots ) Jayson Argue		Goalie stats	Brett Magnus ( 27 saves / 31 shots )

March 5	Bentley	3 – 2	2OT	Sacred Heart	John A. Ryan Arena
(Gorowsky) Max French – SH – 19:25		First period		12:42 – Jordan Minello (Doherty, Danforth)
(Berry, DePourcq) Matt Riggleman – 08:55		Second period		No scoring
No scoring		Third period		12:53 – Ruslan Rakhmatov (Danforth, Minello)
(French, Desbiens) Ryner Gorowsky – GW – 00:30		Second overtime period		No scoring
( 29 saves / 31 shots ) Jayson Argue		Goalie stats		Brett Magnus ( 30 saves / 33 shots )

Bentley won series 2–1

=== Quarterfinals ===
==== (1) Canisius vs. (11) Niagara ====
March 10	Canisius	3 – 0	Niagara	HarborCenter
(Chamberland, McLaughlin) Jimmy Mazza – GW PP – 14:57		First period	No scoring
(Parrottino, Heath) Dylan McLaughlin – 03:32		Second period	No scoring
(Chamberland) Nick Hutchison – 01:48		Third period	No scoring
( 24 saves / 24 shots ) Charles Williams		Goalie stats	Jackson Teichroeb ( 36 saves / 39 shots )

March 11	Canisius	2 – 1	Niagara	HarborCenter	Recap
No scoring		First period	No scoring
No scoring		Second period	No scoring
(Schmelzer, Parrottino) Felix Chamberland – PP – 03:06 (Mazza, Stief) Ryan Schmelzer – GW PP – 18:45		Third period	03:49 – PP – Vinny Muto (Curran, Rennaker)
( 25 saves / 26 shots ) Charles Williams		Goalie stats	Jackson Teichroeb ( 32 saves / 34 shots )

Canisius won series 2–1

==== (2) Air Force vs. (8) Bentley ====
March 10	Air Force	4 – 0	Bentley	Cadet Ice Arena	Recap
No scoring		First period	No scoring
(Bailry, Serratore) Phil Boje – GW – 03:12 (Stone, Boje) Evan Feno – 08:26 (Feno, Boje) Dan Bailey – 09:01		Second period	No scoring
(Feno) Matt Koch – EN SH – 17:06		Third period	No scoring
( 18 saves / 18 shots ) Shane Starrett		Goalie stats	Jayson Argue ( 10 saves / 13 shots ) / Aidan Pelino ( 12 saves / 12 shots )

March 11	Air Force	2 – 1	Bentley	Cadet Ice Arena
(unassisted) Jordan Himley – 05:59		First period	No scoring
No scoring		Second period	10:10 – Andrew McDonald (Callin, Orr)
(Feno) Ben Kucera – GW – 00:39		Third period	No scoring
( 13 saves / 14 shots ) Shane Starrett		Goalie stats	Aidan Pelino ( 37 saves / 39 shots )

Air Force won series 2–0

==== (3) Army vs. (7) Mercyhurst ====
March 10	Army	6 – 4	Mercyhurst	Tate Rink
(Andrle, Pham) Joe Shecter – 03:53		First period	12:57 – PP – Joseph Duszak (Barach, Charbonneau)
(Soucie, Nick) Dominic Franco – PP – 07:42 (Evancho, Andrle) Nick DeCenzo – 15:35		Second period	02:52 – Kyle Dutra (Sienerth, Bucci)
(Nick, Franco) Brendan Soucie – 03:29 (unassisted) Michael Wilson – PP – 05:41 (Fidler, Franco) Brendan Soucie – 10:41		Third period	04:12 – Jonathan Charbonneau (Riley, Todd); 18:01 – EA – Stephen Hrehoriak (Dutra, Drouin)
( 37 saves / 41 shots ) Parker Gahagen		Goalie stats	Brandon Wildung ( 29 saves / 34 shots ) / Colin DeAugustine ( 7 saves / 8 shots )

March 11	Army	2 – 3	OT	Mercyhurst	Tate Rink
(Nick) Conor Andrle – PP – 15:50		First period		08:27 – Matthew Whittaker (Ferriero, Duszak)
No scoring		Second period		No scoring
(Reuschlein, Fidler) Brendan Soucie – 14:18		Third period		09:33 – PP – Josh Lammon (Whittaker, Wu)
No scoring		First overtime period		00:33 – GW PP – Matthew Whittaker (Lancaster, Best)
( 33 saves / 36 shots ) Parker Gahagen		Goalie stats		Brandon Wildung ( 38 saves / 40 shots )

March 12	Army	4 – 3	Mercyhurst	Tate Rink
No scoring		First period	No scoring
(Reuschlein, Wilkinson) Matt Riggleman – PP – 08:55 (Andrle, Pham) Zach Evancho – 15:20		Second period	12:53 – Philippe Drouin (Duszak, Todd); 13:03 – Wes baker (Lancaster, Verboom); 13:41 – Josh Lammon (Wu, Whittaker)
(unassisted) Trevor Fidler – 00:57 (Mansfield, Maruya) Mike Preston – GW – 11:02		Third period	No scoring
( 40 saves / 43 shots ) Parker Gahagen / ( 9 saves / 9 shots ) Cole Bruns		Goalie stats	Colin DeAugustine ( 30 saves / 34 shots )

Army won series 2–1

==== (4) Robert Morris vs. (5) Holy Cross ====
March 10	Robert Morris	6 – 3	Holy Cross	84 Lumber Arena
No scoring		First period	17:35 – PP – Mike Barrett (Moore, Lopez)
(Leavens, Israel) Alex Tonge – PP – 12:36		Second period	No scoring
(Moore, Ghantous) Spencer Dorowicz – 01:50 (Bontje) Brady Ferguson – SH – 02:32 (Lynch, Mann) Daniel Mantenuto – GW – 06:11 (Mantenuto, Leavens) Alex Tonge – 09:36 (Robillard, Dagnal) Kyle Horsman – 16:14		Third period	13:35 – SH – Ryan Ferrill (unassisted); 17:54 – Mitch Collett (Robinson, Mackie)
( 16 saves / 19 shots ) Francis Marotte		Goalie stats	Paul Berrafato ( 21 saves / 27 shots )

March 11	Robert Morris	3 – 2	Holy Cross	84 Lumber Arena
No scoring		First period	No scoring
(Ferguson, Israel) Daniel Leavens – PP – 08:37 (Tonge, Ferguson) Daniel Leavens – 16:34		Second period	No scoring
(Bontje) Brady Ferguson – GW EN – 18:42		Third period	16:09 – Mitch Mollett (Mulcahy, Skelly); 19:36 – EA – Peter Crinella (Pooley, Trapp)
( 22 saves / 24 shots ) Francis Marotte		Goalie stats	Paul Berrafato ( 19 saves / 21 shots )

Robert Morris won series 2–0

=== Semifinals ===
==== (1) Canisius vs. (4) Robert Morris ====
March 17	Canisius	2 – 6	Robert Morris	Blue Cross Arena	Recap
No scoring		First period	12:01 – Spencer Dorowicz (Watt, Ghantous); 19:48 – Daniel Mantanuto (unassisted)
No scoring		Second period	12:40 – GW – Brady Ferguson (Leavens, Tonge)
(Hoover, Edmondson) Nick Hutchison – PP – 04:45 (McLaughlin, Jerry) David Parrottino – EA – 18:03		Third period	14:31 – PP – Brady Ferguson (Leavens); 17:20 – EN – Alex Tonge (Ghantous, Marotte); 18:54 – EN SH – Brady Ferguson (Leavens)
( 19 saves / 23 shots ) Charles Williams		Goalie stats	Francis Marotte ( 27 saves / 29 shots )

==== (2) Air Force vs. (3) Army ====
March 17	Air Force	1 – 0	Army	Blue Cross Arena	Recap
No scoring		First period	No scoring
(Hrabovsky, Giesler) Ben Kucera – GW – 11:03		Second period	No scoring
No scoring		Third period	No scoring
( 29 saves / 29 shots ) Shane Starrett		Goalie stats	Parker Gahagan ( 22 saves / 23 shots )

=== Championship ===
==== (2) Air Force vs. (4) Robert Morris ====
March 18	Air Force	2 – 1	Robert Morris	Blue Cross Arena	Recap
(Himley, Ledford) Erik Baskin – 01:15		First period	No scoring
(Ledford) Jordan Himley – GW – 19:29		Second period	16:02 – Ben Robillard (Israel)
No scoring		Third period	No scoring
( 24 saves / 25 shots ) Shane Starrett		Goalie stats	Francis Marotte ( 12 saves / 14 shots )

== Tournament awards ==
=== All-Tournament Team ===
- G Shane Starrett* (Air Force)
- D Johnny Hrabovsky (Air Force)
- D
- F Jordan Himley (Air Force)
- F Tyler Ledford (Air Force)
- F Brady Ferguson (Robert Morris)

* Most Valuable Player(s)
