= 2016–17 Air Force Falcons men's ice hockey season =

Ice Breaker Tournament, champion Atlantic Hockey Tournament, champion NCAA Tournament, East Regional final
- Conference: 2nd Atlantic Hockey
- Home ice: Cadet Ice Arena

Rankings
- USCHO.com: 12
- USA Today: 11

Record
- Overall: 27–10–5
- Conference: 19–6–3
- Home: 11–4–2
- Road: 12–5–2
- Neutral: 4–1–1

Coaches and captains
- Head coach: Frank Serratore
- Assistant coaches: Andy Berg; Joe Doyle
- Captain(s): Dylan Abood; Johnny Hrabovsky
- Alternate captain: A. J. Reid

The 2016–17 Air Force Falcons men's ice hockey season was the 49th season of play for the program and the 11th season in the Atlantic Hockey conference. The Falcons represented the United States Air Force Academy and were coached by Frank Serratore, in his 20th season.

== Season ==
Air Force began the season as one of the four teams selected to participate in the Ice Breaker Tournament. In a surprising turn of events, the Falcons upset pre-season #5 Boston College behind the standout performance by Shane Starrett. The sophomore netminder faced an onslaught in the championship and turned aside 46 shots to earn a tie. A single-elimination shootout was used to determine the champion and, after Starrett stopped Ohio State's Nick Schilkey, Tyler Ledford scored to secure the title for Air Force. The stunning result contributed to Air Force earning a top-20 ranking the following week, but their position in the polls was short lived as they split the following weekend with Arizona State. The Falcons went through a rough patch in the first half of the year, losing nearly as many games as they won.

The Falcons returned after the winter break with a much more concerted defensive effort and ran a winning streak to 6 games. After dropping a weekend to Canisius in mid-January, Air Force won 9 of their next 11 games. The extended period of success allowed the Falcons to regain a spot in the polls and gave them a chance at winning the Atlantic Hockey title. Entering the final weekend of the regular season, they needed four points to get past Canisius or three to split the regular season title. The Falcons blew out Canisius 5–0 in the first game, leaving them one point behind the Griffins. While they were hoping for a repeat performance in the season finale, the Pioneer netminder, Nathan Perry, stopped 39 Falcon shots. That still left Air Force in the lead by a 2–1 score with about a minute to play. After pulling their goaltender, SHU managed to tie the game with 53 seconds left. In the overtime, Air Force was given a gift when Sacred Heart took a penalty at the 50 second mark. The Falcons were unable to get on track during the power play and failed to record a shot on goal. Instead, the Pioneers were able to get Starrett to take an unsportsmanlike penalty and even the playing field. Just 4 seconds after the ensuing faceoff, the puck found its way into the Air Force net and the Falcons were relegated to 2nd-place.

=== Conference tournament ===
Air Force still earned a bye into their conference quarterfinal round, but they were still on the bubble for the NCAA Tournament. While it was possible that they could make the bracket without a conference championship, it was unlikely even with their outstanding record. The team could ill afford a bad loss now and they took care of business against Bentley. While they had to overcome a 5-minute penalty in the second game, Air Force surrendered just a single goal in the two games and advanced to the semifinal.

They got a tough fight from Army and the two rivals were evenly-matched for most of the contest, but Starrett recorded his second shutout of the tournament and the Falcons moved on to the championship. The team played one of its worst games all-season, recording just 14 shots on goal, but still managed to find the twine on two occasions. The Falcons rode a brilliant performance by Starrett to a championship and earned a trip to the national tournament.

=== NCAA tournament ===
Normally, the Atlantic Hockey champion received a 4th seed for the NCAA tournament. Air Force, with its 26 wins and top-15 ranking, was afforded a 3rd seed, becoming just the second entry from its conference to be given that high of a ranking. They opened the tournament against Western Michigan, who they had already played during the season, and took over the game for the first 44 minutes. The Falcons outshout the Broncos 25–13 entering the third and had a 3–1 lead. Phil Boje netted a power play marker just before the 4-minute mark and it appeared that the Falcons were going to fly to an easy victory. Western Michigan, however, fought back hard and scored twice in the next 75 seconds to cut the lead to 1. Tyler Ledford gave the team a 2-goal cushion less than 90 seconds later but WMU continued to attack. After pulling their goalie, Western Michigan made the score 5–4 with just under 2 minutes to play and all the momentum in their favor. The pressure was eased, however, when Wade Allison took a major penalty at 18:47. Air Force was able to hold off the Broncos and advance to the regional final.

For the Falcons' second game, the script was flipped and the team found itself down by 3 goals at the midway point of the game. However, just over a minute after Harvard's third goal, Michael Floodstrand tripped a Falcon. Air Force got possession of the puck on the delayed penalty and managed to finally solve Merrick Madsen. Because NCAA rules did not wipe out a penalty if a team scored prior to the ensuing whistle, Air Force still got a power play out of the infraction and scored 15 seconds into their advantage. This left the team down by just a single goal with over 28 minutes to play. Unfortunately, Harvard's defense closed ranks and the team played nearly error-free hockey for the rest of the game. The Falcons were able to get several shots on goal, but could get no more to find the back of the net and the team was eliminated.

After the season, Shane Starrett was able to parlay his stellar campaign into a professional contract. He became the first Air Force player to sign with an NHL team when he inked a two-year deal with the Edmonton Oilers.

== Departures ==
Player	Position	Nationality	Cause
Ben Carey	Forward	United States	Graduation (retired)
Ryan Doucet	Forward	United States	Left program
Chris Dylewski	Goaltender	United States	Graduation (retired)
Jake Erickson	Defenseman	United States	Transferred to Norwich
Evan Okeley	Forward	United States	Transferred to St. John's
Matt Perry	Forward	United States	Transferred to St. John's
Zach Yoder	Defenseman	United States	Transferred to Ferris State

== Recruiting ==
Player	Position	Nationality	Age	Notes
Matthew Burchill	Defenseman	United States	20	Boston, MA
Erich Jaeger	Forward	United States	20	Coeur d'Alene, ID
Pierce Pluemer	Forward	United States	20	Phillips, WI
Matt Pulver	Forward	United States	19	Chippewa Falls, WI
Trevor Stone	Goaltender	United States	20	Pleasant Plains, IL
Brady Tomlak	Forward	United States	20	Oakland, MI
Joe Tyran	Defenseman	United States	20	Wadsworth, IL

== Roster ==
No.	Nat.	Player	Class	Pos	Height	Weight	DoB	Hometown	Previous team	NHL rights
2	(United States)	Kyle Mackey	Junior	D	6' 1" (1.85 m)	174 lb (79 kg)	1994-10-07	Derby, New York	Youngstown Phantoms (USHL)	—
3	(United States)	Johnny Hrabovsky (C)	Senior	D	6' 0" (1.83 m)	187 lb (85 kg)	1993-03-19	Hummelstown, Pennsylvania	Tri-City Storm (USHL)	—
4	(United States)	Phil Boje	Junior	D	5' 11" (1.8 m)	192 lb (87 kg)	1994-04-13	Shoreview, Minnesota	Dubuque Fighting Saints (USHL)	—
6	(United States)	Matthew Burchill	Freshman	D	5' 10" (1.78 m)	170 lb (77 kg)	1996-01-31	Boston, Massachusetts	South Shore Kings (USPHL)	—
7	(United States)	Matt Koch	Sophomore	D	6' 1" (1.85 m)	194 lb (88 kg)	1995-03-22	Hastings, Minnesota	Wichita Falls Wildcats (NAHL)	—
9	(United States)	Trevor Stone	Freshman	F	5' 9" (1.75 m)	185 lb (84 kg)	1996-06-03	Pleasant Plains, Illinois	Springfield Jr. Blues (NAHL)	—
10	(United States)	Jordan Himley	Junior	F	5' 8" (1.73 m)	161 lb (73 kg)	1993-12-26	Mundelein, Illinois	Janesville Jets (NAHL)	—
12	(United States)	Matt Serratore	Sophomore	F	5' 9" (1.75 m)	165 lb (75 kg)	1994-06-21	Bemidji, Minnesota	Penticton Vees (BCHL)	—
13	(United States)	Tyler Ledford	Junior	F	5' 9" (1.75 m)	161 lb (73 kg)	1994-04-29	Folsom, California	Wichita Falls Wildcats (NAHL)	—
14	(United States)	Ben Kucera	Junior	F	5' 7" (1.7 m)	185 lb (84 kg)	1995-04-23	Overland Park, Kansas	Wichita Falls Wildcats (NAHL)	—
15	(United States)	Evan Giesler	Sophomore	F	6' 0" (1.83 m)	185 lb (84 kg)	1994-02-19	Naperville, Illinois	Bismarck Bobcats (BCHL)	—
16	(United States)	Kyle Haak	Sophomore	F	6' 0" (1.83 m)	185 lb (84 kg)	1994-08-06	Okemos, Michigan	Aberdeen Wings (NAHL)	—
17	(United States)	Joe Tyran	Freshman	D	6' 0" (1.83 m)	180 lb (82 kg)	1996-03-07	Chattaroy, Washington	Bismarck Bobcats (NAHL)	—
18	(United States)	Evan Feno	Sophomore	F	5' 9" (1.75 m)	170 lb (77 kg)	1995-02-14	Morrison, Colorado	Janesville Jets (NAHL)	—
20	(United States)	Dan Bailey	Sophomore	D	6' 1" (1.85 m)	174 lb (79 kg)	1996-03-21	St. Cloud, Minnesota	Wenatchee Wild (NAHL)	—
21	(United States)	Matt Pulver	Freshman	F	5' 11" (1.8 m)	180 lb (82 kg)	1997-06-05	Chippewa Falls, Wisconsin	Aberdeen Wings (NAHL)	—
22	(United States)	Pierce Pluemer	Freshman	F	6' 4" (1.93 m)	215 lb (98 kg)	1996-01-07	Phillips, Wisconsin	Odessa Jackalopes (NAHL)	—
23	(United States)	Dylan Abood (C)	Junior	D	5' 8" (1.73 m)	165 lb (75 kg)	1993-05-31	Centennial, Colorado	Rio Grande Valley Killer Bees (NAHL)	—
24	(United States)	A. J. Reid (A)	Senior	F	5' 10" (1.78 m)	190 lb (86 kg)	1992-09-09	Lakeville, Minnesota	Austin Bruins (NAHL)	—
25	(United States)	Tyler Rostenkowski	Junior	D	5' 10" (1.78 m)	181 lb (82 kg)	1993-06-02	Chicago, Illinois	Amarillo Bulls (NAHL)	—
26	(United States)	Erich Jaeger	Freshman	F	6' 2" (1.88 m)	195 lb (88 kg)	1996-01-02	Coeur d'Alene, Idaho	Wichita Falls Wildcats (NAHL)	—
27	(United States)	Erik Baskin	Junior	F	6' 3" (1.91 m)	201 lb (91 kg)	1993-10-11	Minnetonka, Minnesota	Aberdeen Wings (NAHL)	—
28	(United States)	Brady Tomlak	Freshman	F	6' 2" (1.88 m)	205 lb (93 kg)	1996-05-14	Oakland, Michigan	Springfield Jr. Blues (NAHL)	—
40	(United States)	Shane Starrett	Sophomore	G	6' 5" (1.96 m)	194 lb (88 kg)	1994-07-12	Bellingham, Massachusetts	South Shore Kings (USPHL)	—
44	(United States)	Billy Christopoulos	Sophomore	G	6' 2" (1.88 m)	194 lb (88 kg)	1994-02-01	Raleigh, North Carolina	Alberni Valley Bulldogs (BCHL)	—
52	(United States)	Jonathan Kopacka	Junior	D	6' 1" (1.85 m)	185 lb (84 kg)	1993-05-28	Macomb, Michigan	Port Huron Fighting Falcons (NAHL)	—

== Standings ==
2016–17 Atlantic Hockey standings
	Conference record							Overall record					
	GP	W	L	T	PTS	GF	GA	GP	W	L	T	GF	GA
Canisius†	28	18	4	6	42	90	53	39	21	11	7	107	85
#12 Air Force*	28	19	6	3	41	91	56	42	27	10	5	133	93
Army	28	15	10	3	33	77	56	37	18	14	5	100	78
Robert Morris	28	15	10	3	33	86	73	38	22	12	4	123	95
Holy Cross	28	11	10	7	29	78	78	36	14	15	7	99	106
RIT	28	13	15	0	26	90	79	37	14	22	1	108	111
Mercyhurst	28	11	13	4	26	82	83	39	15	20	4	106	123
Bentley	28	10	12	6	26	78	82	39	13	19	7	101	120
Sacred Heart	28	10	15	3	23	67	87	37	13	19	5	88	116
American International	28	7	14	7	21	63	91	36	8	20	8	82	122
Niagara	28	3	23	2	8	55	119	39	5	31	3	76	168
Championship: March 18, 2017 † indicates conference regular season champion; * indicates conference tournament champion Rankings: USCHO.com Top 20 Poll; updated March 6, 2017

== Schedule and results ==
Date	Time	Opponent^{#}	Rank^{#}	Site	TV	Decision	Result	Attendance	Record
Exhibition
October 2	6:05 PM	vs. Mount Royal*		Cadet Ice Arena • Colorado Springs, Colorado		Starrett	W 5–1	1,325	
Ice Breaker Tournament
October 7	4:37 PM	vs. #5 Boston College*		Magness Arena • Denver, Colorado (Ice Breaker semifinal)		Starrett	W 2–1	3,984	1–0–0
October 8	4:07 PM	vs. Ohio State*		Magness Arena • Denver, Colorado (Ice Breaker championship)		Starrett	T 3–3 ^{SOW}	4,286	1–0–1
Regular season
October 14	7:05 PM	at Arizona State*	#18	Gila River Arena • Glendale, Arizona		Starrett	W 4–3	1,753	2–0–1
October 15	2:35 PM	at Arizona State*	#18	Gila River Arena • Glendale, Arizona	Pac-12	Christopoulos	L 2–5	853	2–1–1
October 21	7:05 PM	vs. Bentley		Cadet Ice Arena • Colorado Springs, Colorado		Starrett	W 5–2	2,012	3–1–1 (1–0–0)
October 22	7:05 PM	vs. Bentley		Cadet Ice Arena • Colorado Springs, Colorado		Starrett	L 1–6	2,298	3–2–1 (1–1–0)
November 4	5:00 PM	at Army		Tate Rink • West Point, New York		Starrett	L 2–4	2,191	3–3–1 (1–2–0)
November 5	6:05 PM	at Army		Tate Rink • West Point, New York		Starrett	W 3–1	2,456	4–3–1 (2–2–0)
November 11	7:35 PM	vs. RIT		Cadet Ice Arena • Colorado Springs, Colorado		Starrett	W 4–3	2,112	5–3–1 (3–2–0)
November 12	3:05 PM	vs. RIT		Cadet Ice Arena • Colorado Springs, Colorado		Starrett	W 4–3	1,894	6–3–1 (4–2–0)
November 18	5:05 PM	at #18 Western Michigan*		Lawson Arena • Kalamazoo, Michigan	ASN	Christopoulos	T 5–5 ^{OT}	2,455	6–3–2
November 19	6:05 PM	at #18 Western Michigan*		Lawson Arena • Kalamazoo, Michigan		Christopoulos	L 1–4	2,453	6–4–2
November 25	5:05 PM	vs. #2 Denver*		Cadet Ice Arena • Colorado Springs, Colorado		Christopoulos	L 3–4 ^{OT}	2,742	6–5–2
November 26	6:07 PM	at Colorado College*		Broadmoor World Arena • Colorado Springs, Colorado (Battle for Pikes Peak)		Starrett	W 6–3	6,154	7–5–2
December 2	5:05 PM	at Holy Cross		Hart Center • Worcester, Massachusetts		Starrett	T 2–2 ^{OT}	1,309	7–5–3 (4–2–1)
December 3	5:05 PM	at Holy Cross		Hart Center • Worcester, Massachusetts		Starrett	L 2–3	1,421	7–6–3 (4–3–1)
December 9	7:05 PM	vs. Niagara		Cadet Ice Arena • Colorado Springs, Colorado		Starrett	W 2–1	1,694	8–6–3 (5–3–1)
December 10	5:05 PM	vs. Niagara		Cadet Ice Arena • Colorado Springs, Colorado		Starrett	W 4–0	1,906	9–6–3 (6–3–1)
December 30	1:00 PM	at Sacred Heart		Webster Bank Arena • Bridgeport, Connecticut		Starrett	W 3–1	314	10–6–3 (7–3–1)
December 31	1:00 PM	at Sacred Heart		Webster Bank Arena • Bridgeport, Connecticut		Starrett	W 3–2	242	11–6–3 (8–3–1)
January 6	7:05 PM	at Mercyhurst		Mercyhurst Ice Center • Erie, Pennsylvania		Starrett	W 3–1	1,152	12–6–3 (9–3–1)
January 6	5:05 PM	at Mercyhurst		Mercyhurst Ice Center • Erie, Pennsylvania		Christopoulos	W 4–2	1,006	13–6–3 (10–3–1)
January 13	7:05 PM	vs. Canisius		Cadet Ice Arena • Colorado Springs, Colorado		Starrett	L 1–4	1,813	13–7–3 (10–4–1)
January 14	5:05 PM	vs. Canisius		Cadet Ice Arena • Colorado Springs, Colorado		Starrett	T 2–2 ^{OT}	2,014	13–7–4 (10–4–2)
January 20	5:05 PM	at Robert Morris		Colonials Arena • Neville Township, Pennsylvania		Starrett	W 6–2	954	14–7–4 (11–4–2)
January 21	5:05 PM	at Robert Morris		Colonials Arena • Neville Township, Pennsylvania		Christopoulos	L 1–2	1,183	14–8–4 (11–5–2)
January 27	7:05 PM	vs. Army		Cadet Ice Arena • Colorado Springs, Colorado		Starrett	W 3–1	3,123	15–8–4 (12–5–2)
January 28	5:05 PM	vs. Army		Cadet Ice Arena • Colorado Springs, Colorado		Starrett	W 3–2	2,754	16–8–4 (13–5–2)
February 3	5:05 PM	at Bentley		John A. Ryan Arena • Waltham, Massachusetts		Starrett	W 6–1	640	17–8–4 (14–5–2)
February 4	5:05 PM	at Bentley		John A. Ryan Arena • Waltham, Massachusetts		Starrett	W 5–1	505	18–8–4 (15–5–2)
February 10	6:37 PM	vs. American International	#20	Cadet Ice Arena • Colorado Springs, Colorado		Starrett	W 5–0	2,264	19–8–4 (16–5–2)
February 11	5:05 PM	vs. American International	#20	Cadet Ice Arena • Colorado Springs, Colorado		Starrett	T 3–3 ^{OT}	1,906	19–8–5 (16–5–3)
February 17	5:05 PM	at RIT	#19	Gene Polisseni Center • Henrietta, New York	TWCS	Starrett	W 4–2	3,082	20–8–5 (17–5–3)
February 18	5:15 PM	at RIT	#19	Gene Polisseni Center • Henrietta, New York	TWCS	Starrett	W 3–2	3,221	21–8–5 (18–5–3)
February 24	5:05 PM	vs. Sacred Heart	#17	Cadet Ice Arena • Colorado Springs, Colorado		Starrett	W 5–0	2,481	22–8–5 (19–5–3)
February 25	5:05 PM	vs. Sacred Heart	#17	Cadet Ice Arena • Colorado Springs, Colorado		Starrett	L 2–3 ^{OT}	2,344	22–9–5 (19–6–3)
Atlantic Hockey Tournament
March 10	5:05 PM	vs. Bentley*	#18	Cadet Ice Arena • Colorado Springs, Colorado (Atlantic Hockey quarterfinals game 1)		Starrett	W 4–0	1,950	23–9–5
March 10	5:05 PM	vs. Bentley*	#18	Cadet Ice Arena • Colorado Springs, Colorado (Atlantic Hockey quarterfinals game 2)		Starrett	W 2–1	2,115	24–9–5
Air Force Won Series 2–0
March 17	6:05 PM	vs. Army*	#17	Blue Cross Arena • Rochester, New York (Atlantic Hockey semifinal)	TWCS	Starrett	W 1–0	630	25–9–5
March 17	5:05 PM	vs. Robert Morris*	#17	Blue Cross Arena • Rochester, New York (Atlantic Hockey championship)		Starrett	W 5–1	650	26–9–5
NCAA Tournament
March 24	5:34 PM	vs. #8 Western Michigan*	#15	Dunkin' Donuts Center • Providence, Rhode Island (East Regional semifinal)	ESPN3	Starrett	W 5–4	6,543	27–9–5
March 25	6:30 PM	vs. #2 Harvard*	#15	Dunkin' Donuts Center • Providence, Rhode Island (East Regional final)	ESPNU	Starrett	L 2–3	3,708	27–10–5
*Non-conference game. ^{#}Rankings from USCHO.com Poll. All times are in Mountain Time. Source:

== Scoring statistics ==
Name	Position	Games	Goals	Assists	Points	PIM
Jordan Himley	F	41	22	15	37	24
Kyle Haak	F	41	14	19	33	34
Phil Boje	D	42	9	21	30	20
Evan Giesler	F	42	11	18	29	33
Evan Feno	F	40	7	18	25	27
Erik Baskin	F	42	11	12	23	14
Tyler Ledford	F	41	7	15	22	18
Matt Serratore	F	34	4	15	19	12
Brady Tomlak	C	38	5	13	18	30
Matt Koch	D	41	5	13	18	20
A. J. Reid	C/RW	42	9	8	17	27
Dan Bailey	D	39	5	11	16	23
Trevor Stone	C/LW	26	6	6	12	16
Tyler Rostenkowski	D	42	4	8	12	22
Kyle Mackey	D	41	2	8	10	44
Ben Kucera	C	24	5	3	8	10
Johnny Hrabovsky	D	33	1	7	8	16
Pierce Pluemer	LW	29	2	4	6	33
Jonathan Kopacka	D	16	1	5	6	26
Dylan Abood	D	35	1	4	5	10
Erich Jaeger	F	14	1	2	3	4
Matt Pulver	F	7	1	1	2	4
Shane Starrett	G	37	0	2	2	2
Mathew Buchill	D	6	0	0	0	6
Billy Christopoulos	G	8	0	0	0	0
Bench	-	-	-	-	-	8
Total			133	228	361	483

== Goaltending statistics ==
Name	Games	Minutes	Wins	Losses	Ties	Goals against	Saves	Shut outs	SV %	GAA
Shane Starrett	37	2142	26	6	4	71	942	5	.925	1.99
Billy Christopoulos	8	387	1	4	1	18	163	0	.901	2.79
Empty Net	-	20	-	-	-	4	-	-	-	-
Total	42	2549	27	10	5	93	1034	5	.917	2.19

== Rankings ==
Poll	Week																									
Poll	Pre	1	2	3	4	5	6	7	8	9	10	11	12	13	14	15	16	17	18	19	20	21	22	23	24	25 (Final)
USCHO.com	NR	18	NR	NR	NR	NR	NR	NR	NR	NR	NR	NR	NR	NR	NR	NR	NR	20	19	17	18	18	17	15	-	12
USA Today	NR	NR	NR	NR	NR	NR	NR	NR	NR	NR	NR	NR	NR	NR	NR	NR	NR	NR	NR	NR	NR	NR	NR	15	10	11

USCHO did not release a poll in Week 24.

== Awards and honors ==
Player	Award	Ref
Shane Starrett	Atlantic Hockey Tournament MVP	
Phil Boje	All-Atlantic Hockey First Team	
Jordan Himley	All-Atlantic Hockey Second Team	
Shane Starrett	All-Atlantic Hockey Third Team	
Shane Starrett	Atlantic Hockey All-Tournament Team	
Johnny Hrabovsky	Atlantic Hockey All-Tournament Team	
Jordan Himley	Atlantic Hockey All-Tournament Team	
Tyler Ledford	Atlantic Hockey All-Tournament Team	
