= 2016–17 American International Yellow Jackets men's ice hockey season =

- Conference: 10th Atlantic Hockey
- Home ice: MassMutual Center

Rankings
- USCHO: NR
- USA Today: NR

Record
- Overall: 8–20–8
- Conference: 7–14–7
- Home: 4–9–4
- Road: 4–11–4

Coaches and captains
- Head coach: Eric Lang
- Assistant coaches: Mike Towns; Steve Wiedler; Matt Voity
- Captain: Austin Orszulak
- Alternate captain(s): Bryant Christian; Dominic Racobaldo

The 2016–17 American International Yellow Jackets men's ice hockey season was the 69th season of play for the program, the 21st at the Division I level, and the 14th in the Atlantic Hockey conference. The Yellow Jackets represented American International College and were coached by Eric Lang, in his 1st season.

== Season ==
AIC began the season with a new coach for the first time in 32 years. Eric Lang, an alumnus, replaced Gary Wright behind the bench. The chance in leadership presaged a tone for the program and led to nice players leaving the team early. While all the roster spots were filled, the sizable roster turnover did no favors for the Yellow Jackets in terms of wins. In the first half of the season, American International won just 3 out of 18 games and were stuck in a familiar position; the bottom of the Atlantic Hockey standings.

While the team failed to win many games, they did fight hard and pushed several opponents into overtime. By the end of November the Yellow Jackets had more ties than losses and a great deal of credit could be attributed to the surprising defensive effort from the squad. The goaltending tandem of Alex Murray and Zackarias Skog combined to keep AIC in many games where they were otherwise outplayed and gave some hope that the team might be able to climb out of the conference cellar.

In the second half of the year the Yellow Jackets saw a moderate increase to their win total but the defense slipped. Murray struggled mightily as the season wore on and won just 1 of his 7 decisions. Since the revamped offense was little help, the bulk of the team's victories came on the shoulders of Skog, who posted a winning record after new year's. AIC finished 10th in the conference and, though their first round opponent was hardly formidable, the Yellow Jackets were unable to overcome Mercyhurst and were swept out of the postseason.

A disappointing finish was hardly a new state of affairs for the program, however, AIC had seen some signs of life during the season. Importantly, many of the new additions had played significant rolls in the team's limitded success. Not only had Skog established himself as the starting goaltender, but the top four scorers on the team were all freshmen.

== Departures ==
Player	Position	Nationality	Cause
Lucas Bombardier	Forward	United States	Transferred to Trine
Giovanni Bombini	Forward	Canada	Left program (retired)
Jacob Caffrey	Goaltender	United States	Transferred to Stevenson
Trevor Cope	Forward	United States	Transferred to Michigan–Flint
Travis Douglas	Forward	Canada	Transferred to Carleton
David Gandara	Forward	United States	Graduation (signed with Louisiana IceGators)
Derek Henderson	Defenseman	United States	Graduation (signed with Macon Mayhem)
Hunter Leisner	Goaltender	United States	Left program (retired)
Brandon Lubin	Defenseman	United States	Graduation (signed with Pensacola Ice Flyers)
Bailey More	Forward	United States	Left program (retired)
Mitchell Mueller	Forward/Defenseman	United States	Signed professional contract (Peoria Rivermen)
Chris Porter	Forward	Canada	Graduation (signed with Fayetteville FireAntz)
Luke Rodgers	Forward	United States	Transferred to Endicott
Wade Schools	Defenseman	United States	Left program (retired)

== Recruiting ==
Player	Position	Nationality	Age	Notes
Blake Christensen	Forward	United States	21	Coral Springs, FL
Patrik Demel	Defenseman	Czech Republic	20	Ostrava, CZE
Dominik Florián	Forward	Czech Republic	21	Vlašim, CZE
Jānis Jaks	Defenseman	Latvia	21	Riga, LAT
Justin Ketola	Goaltender	United States	21	Esko, MN
Nicolas Luka	Defenseman	United States	21	Bartlett, IL
Martin Mellberg	Forward	Sweden	21	Stockholm, SWE
Jared Pike	Forward	United States	20	Sandy, UT
Hugo Reinhardt	Forward	Sweden	20	Kungsbacka, SWE
Zackarias Skog	Goaltender	Sweden	21	Gothenburg, SWE
Kyle Stephan	Forward	Canada	21	Barrie, ON
Billy Vizzo	Forward	United States	20	Shelton, CT

== Roster ==
No.	Nat.	Player	Class	Pos	Height	Weight	DoB	Hometown	Previous team	NHL rights
1	(Sweden)	Zackarias Skog	Freshman	G	6' 4" (1.93 m)	200 lb (91 kg)	1995-06-27	Gothenburg, Sweden	Omaha Lancers (USHL)	—
2	(United States)	Nicolas Luka	Freshman	D	5' 11" (1.8 m)	175 lb (79 kg)	1995-08-18	Bartlett, Illinois	Coulee Region Chill (NAHL)	—
3	(Czech Republic)	Patrik Demel	Freshman	D	5' 11" (1.8 m)	185 lb (84 kg)	1995-11-28	Ostrava, Czech Republic	Bismarck Bobcats (NAHL)	—
4	(United States)	Dominic Racobaldo (A)	Junior (RS)	D	6' 3" (1.91 m)	220 lb (100 kg)	1992-06-03	Pennsauken, New Jersey	Omaha Lancers (USHL)	—
5	(United States)	Ryan Polin	Sophomore	D	5' 11" (1.8 m)	194 lb (88 kg)	1994-12-05	Fairbanks, Alaska	Topeka Roadrunners (NAHL)	—
7	(United States)	Daniel Mele	Sophomore (RS)	F	5' 11" (1.8 m)	185 lb (84 kg)	1993-10-12	Buffalo, New York	Connecticut (HEA)	—
9	(United States)	Billy Vizzo	Freshman	F	5' 11" (1.8 m)	185 lb (84 kg)	1995-11-17	Shelton, Connecticut	P.A.L. Junior Islanders (USPHL)	—
10	(Sweden)	Martin Mellberg	Freshman	F	6' 1" (1.85 m)	183 lb (83 kg)	1995-09-17	Stockholm, Sweden	Lone Star Brahmas (NAHL)	—
11	(United States)	Bryant Christian (A)	Junior	F	5' 10" (1.78 m)	176 lb (80 kg)	1993-06-10	Moorhead, Minnesota	Prince George Spruce Kings (BCHL)	—
12	(United States)	Johno May	Junior	F	6' 5" (1.96 m)	205 lb (93 kg)	1993-10-16	Mahtomedi, Minnesota	Minnesota Wilderness (NAHL)	—
13	(Sweden)	Hugo Reinhardt	Freshman	F	5' 11" (1.8 m)	200 lb (91 kg)	1996-04-06	Kungsbacka, Sweden	Fargo Force (USHL)	—
14	(United States)	Jared Pike	Freshman	F	6' 4" (1.93 m)	215 lb (98 kg)	1995-12-31	Sandy, Utah	Bismarck Bobcats (NAHL)	—
15	(Canada)	Jackson Dudley	Junior	F	5' 9" (1.75 m)	161 lb (73 kg)	1993-12-17	Edmonton, Alberta	Bonnyville Pontiacs (AJHL)	—
17	(United States)	Austin Orszulak (C)	Senior	F	5' 9" (1.75 m)	174 lb (79 kg)	1992-05-08	Springfield, Massachusetts	Springfield Jr. Pics (EJHL)	—
18	(United States)	Blake Christensen	Freshman	F	5' 9" (1.75 m)	180 lb (82 kg)	1995-09-15	Coral Springs, Florida	Wenatchee Wild (BCHL)	—
19	(Canada)	Kyle Stephan	Freshman	F	6' 2" (1.88 m)	190 lb (86 kg)	1995-02-20	Banff, Alberta	Wenatchee Wild (BCHL)	—
21	(Canada)	Marc Dubeau	Sophomore	F	6' 5" (1.96 m)	216 lb (98 kg)	1994-06-29	St. Lina, Alberta	Kindersley Klippers (SJHL)	—
22	(Czech Republic)	Dominik Florián	Freshman	F	6' 4" (1.93 m)	201 lb (91 kg)	1995-05-12	Vlašim, Czech Republic	Coulee Region Chill (NAHL)	—
23	(United States)	Andrew DeBrincat	Junior	D	5' 7" (1.7 m)	161 lb (73 kg)	1993-07-21	Farmington Hills, Michigan	New Jersey Hitmen (USPHL)	—
24	(Canada)	Joel Kocur	Junior	F	6' 1" (1.85 m)	188 lb (85 kg)	1995-09-18	Edson, Alberta	Flin Flon (SJHL)	—
25	(Canada)	Carson Grolla	Senior	D	5' 11" (1.8 m)	205 lb (93 kg)	1992-04-15	Saskatoon, Saskatchewan	Notre Dame Hounds (SJHL)	—
26	(United States)	Johnny Mueller	Sophomore	D	5' 9" (1.75 m)	185 lb (84 kg)	1994-05-13	St. Peters, Missouri	Fairbanks Ice Dogs (NAHL)	—
27	(Latvia)	Jānis Jaks	Freshman	D	6' 0" (1.83 m)	190 lb (86 kg)	1995-08-22	Iecava, Latvia	Minnesota Wilderness (NAHL)	—
29	(Canada)	Shawn McBride	Sophomore	F/D	6' 2" (1.88 m)	201 lb (91 kg)	1995-08-23	Victoria, British Columbia	Victoria Grizzlies (BCHL)	—
30	(United States)	Justin Ketola	Freshman	G	5' 11" (1.8 m)	174 lb (79 kg)	1995-08-25	Esko, Minnesota	P.A.L. Junior Islanders (USPHL)	—
33	(Canada)	Alex Murray	Junior	G	6' 0" (1.83 m)	194 lb (88 kg)	1993-06-29	Burlington, Ontario	Prince George Spruce Kings (BCHL)	—

== Standings ==
2016–17 Atlantic Hockey standings
	Conference record							Overall record					
	GP	W	L	T	PTS	GF	GA	GP	W	L	T	GF	GA
Canisius†	28	18	4	6	42	90	53	39	21	11	7	107	85
#12 Air Force*	28	19	6	3	41	91	56	42	27	10	5	133	93
Army	28	15	10	3	33	77	56	37	18	14	5	100	78
Robert Morris	28	15	10	3	33	86	73	38	22	12	4	123	95
Holy Cross	28	11	10	7	29	78	78	36	14	15	7	99	106
RIT	28	13	15	0	26	90	79	37	14	22	1	108	111
Mercyhurst	28	11	13	4	26	82	83	39	15	20	4	106	123
Bentley	28	10	12	6	26	78	82	39	13	19	7	101	120
Sacred Heart	28	10	15	3	23	67	87	37	13	19	5	88	116
American International	28	7	14	7	21	63	91	36	8	20	8	82	122
Niagara	28	3	23	2	8	55	119	39	5	31	3	76	168
Championship: March 18, 2017 † indicates conference regular season champion; * indicates conference tournament champion Rankings: USCHO.com Top 20 Poll; updated March 6, 2017

== Schedule and results ==
Date	Time	Opponent^{#}	Rank^{#}	Site	TV	Decision	Result	Attendance	Record
Regular season
October 14	7:05 PM	vs. Union*		MassMutual Center • Springfield, Massachusetts		Murray	L 4–5	1,204	0–1–0
October 21	7:05 PM	at Connecticut*		XL Center • Hartford, Connecticut		Skog	T 2–2 ^{OT}	3.529	0–1–1
October 23	3:05 PM	vs. Sacred Heart		MassMutual Center • Springfield, Massachusetts		Skog	L 3–6	227	0–2–1 (0–1–0)
October 28	7:05 PM	at Mercyhurst		Mercyhurst Ice Center • Erie, Pennsylvania		Murray	W 5–3	1,127	1–2–1 (1–1–0)
October 29	7:05 PM	at Mercyhurst		Mercyhurst Ice Center • Erie, Pennsylvania		Skog	L 3–6	1,386	1–3–1 (1–2–0)
November 3	7:05 PM	vs. Holy Cross		MassMutual Center • Springfield, Massachusetts		Skog	W 4–2	362	2–3–1 (2–2–0)
November 4	7:05 PM	at Holy Cross		Hart Center • Worcester, Massachusetts		Murray	T 4–4 ^{OT}	698	2–3–2 (2–2–1)
November 8	7:05 PM	vs. Bentley		MassMutual Center • Springfield, Massachusetts		Skog	T 2–2 ^{OT}	152	2–3–3 (2–2–2)
November 10	7:05 PM	vs. Bentley		MassMutual Center • Springfield, Massachusetts		Skog	T 1–1 ^{OT}	452	2–3–4 (2–2–3)
November 18	7:05 PM	at Canisius		LECOM Harborcenter • Buffalo, New York		Skog	L 0–4	933	2–4–4 (2–3–3)
November 19	4:05 PM	at Canisius		LECOM Harborcenter • Buffalo, New York		Skog	T 1–1 ^{OT}	417	2–4–5 (2–3–4)
November 22	7:05 PM	vs. Sacred Heart		MassMutual Center • Springfield, Massachusetts		Skog	L 3–7	208	2–5–5 (2–4–4)
November 25	2:05 PM	vs. Niagara		MassMutual Center • Springfield, Massachusetts		Murray	T 0–0 ^{OT}	523	2–5–6 (2–4–5)
November 26	5:05 PM	vs. Niagara		MassMutual Center • Springfield, Massachusetts		Murray	W 3–1	423	3–5–6 (3–4–5)
December 2	7:05 PM	at Army		Tate Rink • West Point, New York		Murray	L 0–1	1,516	3–6–6 (3–5–5)
December 9	7:07 PM	at Maine*		Alfond Arena • Orono, Maine		Murray	L 3–5	3,578	3–7–6
December 10	5:35 PM	at Maine*		Alfond Arena • Orono, Maine		Skog	L 2–7	3,365	3–8–6
December 13	7:05 PM	vs. Arizona State*		MassMutual Center • Springfield, Massachusetts		Murray	L 2–3	548	3–9–6
January 3	7:00 PM	at Massachusetts*		Mullins Center • Amherst, Massachusetts		Skog	W 3–0	1,024	4–9–6
January 6	7:05 PM	at Robert Morris		Colonials Arena • Neville Township, Pennsylvania		Skog	L 0–3	525	4–10–6 (3–6–5)
January 7	7:05 PM	at Robert Morris		Colonials Arena • Neville Township, Pennsylvania		Murray	L 3–4	763	4–11–6 (3–7–5)
January 13	7:05 PM	vs. RIT		MassMutual Center • Springfield, Massachusetts		Murray	L 0–5	350	4–12–6 (3–8–5)
January 14	2:05 PM	vs. RIT		MassMutual Center • Springfield, Massachusetts		Skog	W 5–3	350	5–12–6 (4–8–5)
January 17	7:05 PM	vs. Army		MassMutual Center • Springfield, Massachusetts		Skog	L 0–2	370	5–13–6 (4–9–5)
January 20	7:07 PM	at Niagara		Dwyer Arena • Lewiston, New York		Skog	W 7–3	680	6–13–6 (5–9–5)
January 21	7:05 PM	at Niagara		Dwyer Arena • Lewiston, New York		Murray	W 7–2	784	7–13–6 (6–9–5)
January 27	2:05 PM	vs. Canisius		MassMutual Center • Springfield, Massachusetts		Murray	L 2–4	103	7–14–6 (6–10–5)
January 28	2:05 PM	vs. Canisius		MassMutual Center • Springfield, Massachusetts		Murray	L 1–6	351	7–15–6 (6–11–5)
February 2	7:05 PM	vs. Holy Cross		MassMutual Center • Springfield, Massachusetts		Murray	L 1–3	402	7–16–6 (6–12–5)
February 3	7:05 PM	at Holy Cross		Hart Center • Worcester, Massachusetts		Murray	L 2–8	1,224	7–17–6 (6–13–5)
February 10	8:37 PM	at #20 Air Force		Cadet Ice Arena • Colorado Springs, Colorado		Skog	L 0–5	2,264	7–18–6 (6–14–5)
February 11	7:05 PM	at #20 Air Force		Cadet Ice Arena • Colorado Springs, Colorado		Skog	T 3–3 ^{OT}	1,906	7–18–7 (6–14–6)
February 23	7:05 PM	vs. Army		MassMutual Center • Springfield, Massachusetts		Skog	T 1–1 ^{OT}	764	7–18–8 (6–14–7)
February 25	7:05 PM	vs. Army		MassMutual Center • Springfield, Massachusetts		Skog	W 2–1 ^{OT}	2,418	8–18–8 (7–14–7)
Atlantic Hockey Tournament
March 3	7:05 PM	at Mercyhurst*		Mercyhurst Ice Center • Erie, Pennsylvania (Atlantic Hockey First Round game 1)		Skog	L 3–4	1,042	8–19–8
March 4	7:05 PM	at Mercyhurst*		Mercyhurst Ice Center • Erie, Pennsylvania (Atlantic Hockey First Round game 2)		Skog	L 0–5	1,001	8–20–8
American International Lost Series 0–2
*Non-conference game. ^{#}Rankings from USCHO.com Poll. All times are in Eastern Time. Source:

== Scoring statistics ==
Name	Position	Games	Goals	Assists	Points	PIM
Blake Christensen	LW	33	8	13	21	37
Dominik Florián {{{last}}}	F	35	10	10	20	32
Martin Mellberg	RW	35	7	12	19	32
Hugo Reinhardt	C	35	6	13	19	18
Austin Orszulak	LW	36	9	5	14	24
Johnny Mueller	D	35	4	10	14	32
Shawn McBride	C/D	35	4	10	14	6
Andrew DeBrincat	D	34	1	13	14	22
Jānis Jaks	D	27	5	6	11	10
Jackson Dudley	LW	25	2	8	10	8
Patrik Demel	D	14	4	5	9	2
Nicolas Luka	D	34	3	6	9	24
Kyle Stephan	RW	24	3	5	8	26
Johno May	C/RW	33	3	5	8	20
Jared Pike	F	36	5	2	7	30
Bryant Christian	F	35	1	5	6	24
Joel Kocur	C/LW	28	3	2	5	10
Marc Dubeau	D	31	2	3	5	6
Ryan Polin	D	31	1	4	5	10
Billy Vizzo	F	8	1	0	1	2
Carson Grolla	D	14	0	1	1	6
Zacharias Skog	G	24	0	1	1	6
Dominic Racobaldo	D	25	0	0	0	6
Daniel Mele	F	3	0	0	0	0
Justin Ketola	G	4	0	0	0	0
Alex Murray	G	15	0	0	0	0
Bench	-	-	-	-	-	6
Total			82	140	222	399

== Goaltending statistics ==
Name	Games	Minutes	Wins	Losses	Ties	Goals against	Saves	Shut outs	SV %	GAA
Zacharias Skog	24	1356	5	12	6	69	652	1	.904	3.05
Alex Murray	15	753	3	8	2	45	340	1	.883	3.58
Justin Ketola	4	64	0	0	0	6	24	0	.800	5.60
Empty Net	-	26	-	-	-	2	-	-	-	-
Total	36	2201	8	20	8	122	1016	2	.893	3.32

== Rankings ==
Poll	Week																									
Poll	Pre	1	2	3	4	5	6	7	8	9	10	11	12	13	14	15	16	17	18	19	20	21	22	23	24	25 (Final)
USCHO.com	NR	NR	NR	NR	NR	NR	NR	NR	NR	NR	NR	NR	NR	NR	NR	NR	NR	NR	NR	NR	NR	NR	NR	NR	-	NR
USA Today	NR	NR	NR	NR	NR	NR	NR	NR	NR	NR	NR	NR	NR	NR	NR	NR	NR	NR	NR	NR	NR	NR	NR	NR	NR	NR

USCHO did not release a poll in Week 24.
