= 2013 Atlantic Hockey men's ice hockey tournament =

2013 Atlantic Hockey Men's ice hockey tournament
- Dates: March 8–23, 2013
- Teams: 12
- Finals site: Blue Cross Arena; Rochester, New York
- Champions: Canisius (1st title)
- Winning coach: Dave Smith (1st title)
- MVP: Kyle Gibbons (Canisius)
- Atlantic Hockey Men's Ice Hockey Tournaments

The 2013 Atlantic Hockey Tournament is the 10th Atlantic Hockey Tournament. It will be played between March 8 and March 23, 2013 at campus locations and at the Blue Cross Arena in Rochester, New York, United States. The winner of the tournament will earn Atlantic Hockey's automatic bid to the 2013 NCAA Division I Men's Ice Hockey Tournament.

== Format ==
The tournament features four rounds of play. In the first round the fifth and twelfth, sixth and eleventh, seventh and tenth, and eighth and ninth seeds, as determined by the conference regular season standings, play a best-of-three series with the winners advancing to the quarterfinals. The top four teams from the conference regular season standings receive a bye to the quarterfinals. There, the first seed and lowest-ranked first-round winner, the second seed and second-lowest-ranked first-round winner, the third seed and second-highest-ranked first-round winner, and the fourth seed and the highest-ranked first-round winner play a best-of-three series, with the winners advancing to the semifinals. In the semifinals, the highest and lowest seeds and second-highest and second-lowest seeds play a single game, with the winner advancing to the championship game. The tournament champion receives an automatic bid to the 2013 NCAA Division I Men's Ice Hockey Tournament.

=== Standings ===
Note: GP = Games played; W = Wins; L = Losses; T = Ties; PTS = Points; GF = Goals For; GA = Goals Against

2012–13 Atlantic Hockey standings
	Conference record							Overall record					
	GP	W	L	T	PTS	GF	GA	GP	W	L	T	GF	GA
#15 Niagara †	27	20	5	2	42	92	60	38	23	10	5	116	95
Air Force	27	15	7	5	35	92	56	37	17	13	7	120	92
Holy Cross	27	15	9	3	33	83	79	37	20	14	3	111	106
Connecticut	27	14	10	3	31	77	70	37	19	14	4	102	94
Robert Morris	27	13	11	3	29	85	85	38	20	14	4	118	105
Mercyhurst	27	12	11	4	28	90	73	41	19	17	5	128	112
#19 Canisius *	27	12	13	2	26	71	69	43	19	19	5	113	104
RIT	27	11	12	4	26	88	89	38	15	18	5	122	126
American International	27	9	12	6	24	72	78	35	12	17	6	88	112
Bentley	27	10	14	3	23	85	87	35	12	20	3	108	116
Army	27	7	15	5	19	64	92	34	7	22	5	73	121
Sacred Heart	27	2	21	4	8	67	128	36	2	30	4	83	182
Championship: March 23, 2013 † indicates conference regular season champion; * indicates conference tournament champion Rankings: USCHO.com Top 20 Poll

== Bracket ==
First round March 8–10
5	Robert Morris	4	6	—
12	Sacred Heart	1	1	—
6	Mercyhurst	3	5	—
11	Army	1	2	—
7	Canisius	4	2	—
10	Bentley	0	1	—
8	RIT	2	7	—
9	American International	1	1	—

Quarterfinals; March 15–17
1	Niagara	3	2*	—
8	RIT	2	1	—
2	Air Force	3	3	—
7	Canisius	4	4*	—
3	Holy Cross	2	3	0
6	Mercyhurst	3	2	1
4	Connecticut	4	4	—
5	Robert Morris	1	3	—

Semifinals; March 22
1	Niagara	3
7	Canisius	5
4	Connecticut	1
6	Mercyhurst	4

Championship; March 23
6	Mercyhurst	2
7	Canisius	7

Note: * denotes overtime period(s)

== Results ==
=== First round ===
==== (5) Robert Morris vs. (12) Sacred Heart ====
March 8	Robert Morris	4 – 1	Sacred Heart	84 Lumber Arena	Recap
(Hervato, South) Jeff Jones - 01:12 (Lynch, Renwick) Mac Roy - GW - 06:17 (Blazek) Greg Gibson - 14:14		First period	No scoring
No scoring		Second period	No scoring
(Jacklin, Wydo) Adam Brace - EN - 19:16		Third period	14:46 - Eric Delong (Sheehan, Barthelmess)
( 26 saves / 27 shots ) Eric Levine		Goalie stats	Andrew Bodnarchuk ( 32 saves / 35 shots )

March 9	Robert Morris	6 – 1	Sacred Heart	84 Lumber Arena	Recap
(Brace, Brace) Colin South - 09:27		First period	16:14 - Kyle Verbeek (Lake, Curry)
(Brace, Golightly) Tyler Hinds - GW - 02:22 (Jacklin, Brace) Cody Wydo - EN - 06:01 (Lynch) Matt Cope - 17:41		Second period	No scoring
(Brace) Cody Wydo - PP - 10:32 (Renwick, Cope) Greg Gibson - 14:35		Third period	No scoring
( 22 saves / 23 shots ) Eric Levine		Goalie stats	Andrew Bodnarchuk ( 40 saves / 34 shots )

Robert Morris won series 2–0

==== (6) Mercyhurst vs. (11) Army ====
March 8	Mercyhurst	3 – 1	Army	Mercyhurst Ice Center	Recap
No Scoring		First period	17:49 - Andy Starczewski (Richards, Lalor)
No scoring		Second period	No scoring
(O'Donoghue, Mastrodicasa) Kyle Just - 10:38 (Misiak, O'Donoghue) Zac Frischmon - GW - 14:34 (Zay, Blakey) Chris Bodo - EN - 19:02		Third period	No scoring
( 20 saves / 21 shots ) Jordan Tibbett		Goalie stats	Rob Tadazak ( 25 saves / 27 shots )

March 9	Mercyhurst	5 – 2	Army	Mercyhurst Ice Center	Recap
(Zay, Bodo) Grant Blakey - 05:24		First period	No scoring
(Just, Frischmon) Daniel O'Donoghue - 04:38		Second period	13:39 - PP - Willie Faust (Pomarico, Zaremba)
(Just, Jones) Grant Blakey - GW - 08:56 (Frischmon, Just) Daniel O'Donoghue - 16:28 (Jones) Ryan Misiak - EN - 19:09		Third period	15:07 - Joe Kozlak (Clark)
( 36 saves / 38 shots ) Max Strang		Goalie stats	Rob Tadazak ( 34 saves / 38 shots )

Mercyhurst won series 2–0

==== (7) Canisius vs. (10) Bentley ====
March 8	Canisius	4 – 0	Bentley	Buffalo State Sports Arena	Recap
No Scoring		First period	No scoring
(Gibbons, Sullivan) Cody Freeman - GW - 05:00		Second period	No scoring
(Sullivan, Gibbons) Ben Parker - 02:26 (Cuddemi) Preston Shupe - PP - 15:09 (McCrank, Roe) Preston Shupe - SH EN - 19:24		Third period	No scoring
( 35 saves / 35 shots ) Tony Capobianco		Goalie stats	Branden Komm ( 32 saves / 35 shots )

March 9	Canisius	2 – 1	Bentley	Buffalo State Sports Arena	Recap
No Scoring		First period	No scoring
(Gibbons, Roe) Cody Freeman - 14:36 (Gibbons, Farrell) Cody Freeman - 19:01		Second period	No scoring
No scoring		Third period	15:20 - Andrew Gladiuk (Rickord, Koudys)
( 35 saves / 36 shots ) Tony Capobianco		Goalie stats	Branden Komm ( 35 saves / 37 shots )

Canisius won series 2–0

==== (8) RIT vs. (9) American International ====
March 8	RIT	2 – 1	American International	Frank Ritter Memorial Ice Arena	Recap
(Colavecchia, Noyes) Chris Saracino - PP - 13:58		First period	No scoring
(McGowan, Garbowsky) Josh Mitchell - GW - 19:47		Second period	03:16 - Jon Puskar (Porter)
No scoring		Third period	No scoring
( 32 saves / 33 shots ) Jordan Ruby		Goalie stats	Ben Meisner ( 30 saves / 32 shots )

March 9	RIT	7 – 1	American International	Frank Ritter Memorial Ice Arena	Recap
(Noyes, Garbowsky) Chris Saracino - PP - 11:03 (Garbowsky, Saracino) Dan Schuler - GW SH - 19:19		First period	No scoring
(Schuler, Garbowsky) Nolan Descoteaux - 09:14 (Raibl) Brad McGowan - 17:45		Second period	No scoring
(Schuler) Matt Garbowsky - 10:46 (Noyes, Mitchell) Ben Lynch - 13:15 (Kuqali, Lynch) Jeff Smith - 14:06		Third period	03:16 - Chris Porter (Lubin, Puskar)
( 33 saves / 34 shots ) Jordan Ruby		Goalie stats	Ben Meisner ( 23 saves / 30 shots ) / Chandler Long ( 1 saves / 1 shots )

RIT won series 2–0

=== Quarterfinals ===
==== (1) Niagara vs. (8) RIT ====
March 15	Niagara	3 – 2	RIT	Dwyer Arena	Recap
No Scoring		First period	No scoring
(Iuorio, Murphy) Jason Beattie - 15:02		Second period	06:11 - Matt Garbowsky (McGowan, Schuler)
(Chartrain, Ryan) Giancarlo Iuorio - 03:27 (Weiss, Zanette) Giancarlo Iuorio - GW - 11:28		Third period	09:26 - Adam Mitchell (Colavecchia, Garbowsky)
( 25 saves / 27 shots ) Carsen Chubak		Goalie stats	Jordan Ruby ( 29 saves / 32 shots )

March 16	Niagara	2 – 1	OT	RIT	Dwyer Arena	Recap
No Scoring		First period		01:12 - SH - Josh Mitchell (Lynch)
(Ryan, Murphy) Patrick Divjak - 14:17		Second period		No scoring
No scoring		Third period		No scoring
(Murphy) Marc Zanette - 13:12		First overtime period		No scoring
( 34 saves / 35 shots ) Carsen Chubak		Goalie stats		Jordan Ruby ( 39 saves / 41 shots )

Niagara won series 2–0

==== (2) Air Force vs. (7) Canisius ====
March 15	Air Force	3 – 4	Canisius	Cadet Ice Arena	Recap
No Scoring		First period	11:57 - Ryan Bohrer (Larsson, Miller)
(Gunner, Walsh) Kyle De Laurell - 06:36 (Gunner) Stephen Carew - 14:45		Second period	09:11 - Patrick Sullivan (Jessey, Parker)
(Weissenhofer, De Laurell) Tony Thomas - SH EA - 18:52		Third period	07:56 - PP - Patrick Sullivan (unassisted); 19:51 - GW PP - Kyle Gibbons (Freeman, McCrank)
( 22 saves / 26 shots ) Jason Torf		Goalie stats	Tony Capobianco ( 40 saves / 43 shots )

March 16	Air Force	3 – 4	OT	Canisius	Cadet Ice Arena	Recap
(Kruse, Halloran) Ben Carey - 18:04		First period		06:13 - Preston Shupe (Cuddemi, Jessey)
(Holm, Carey) Adam McKenzie - 02:21 (De Laurell, Carew) Adam McKenzie - PP - 11:25		Second period		16:33 - Kyle Gibbons (Sullivan, Parker)
No scoring		Third period		18:02 - Matthew Grazen (Miller, Lindsay)
No scoring		First overtime period		01:08 - Duncan McKellar (unassisted)
( 21 saves / 25 shots ) Jason Torf		Goalie stats		Tony Capobianco ( 50 saves / 53 shots )

Canisius won series 2–0

==== (3) Holy Cross vs. (6) Mercyhurst ====
March 15	Holy Cross	2 – 3	Mercyhurst	Hart Center	Recap
(Schmidt, Nunn) Shayne Stockton - 10:31		First period	No scoring
(Beckman, Youso) Mike McNamara - 18:20		Second period	16:07 - PP - Tyler Shiplo (Just, O'Donoghue); 18:29 - Daniel Bahntge (unassisted)
No scoring		Third period	07:17 - GW - Grant Blakey (Bodo, Gettinger)
( 26 saves / 29 shots ) Matt Ginn		Goalie stats	Jordan Tibbett ( 24 saves / 26 shots )

March 16	Holy Cross	3 – 2	Mercyhurst	Hart Center	Recap
No Scoring		First period	14:39 - Chris Bodo (Shiplo, Blakey)
(Linsmayer, Stockton) Brandon Nunn - PP - 12:43		Second period	14:30 - Grant Blakey (Just, Shiplo)
(McNamara, Ginn) Shayne Stockton - 06:06 (Stockton, Beckman) Joe McNamara - GW - 09:08		Third period	No scoring
( 31 saves / 33 shots ) Matt Ginn		Goalie stats	Max Strang ( 35 saves / 38 shots )

March 17	Holy Cross	0 – 1	Mercyhurst	Hart Center	Recap
No Scoring		First period	16:49 - Grant Blakey (Bahntge)
No scoring		Second period	No scoring
No scoring		Third period	No scoring
( 32 saves / 33 shots ) Matt Ginn		Goalie stats	Jordan Tibbett ( 28 saves / 28 shots )

Mercyhurst won series 2–1

==== (4) Connecticut vs. (5) Robert Morris ====
March 15	Connecticut	4 – 1	Robert Morris	Freitas Ice Forum	Recap
(Ambrosie, Sims) Brant Harris - 13:16		First period	11:00 - PP - Cody Wydo (Brace)
(Poe) Joey Ferriss - GW - 04:55 (Gerke, Kirtland) Shawn Pauly - 05:45		Second period	No scoring
(unassisted) Evan Carriere - EN - 18:53		Third period	No scoring
( 19 saves / 20 shots ) Matt Grogan		Goalie stats	Eric Levine ( 20 saves / 23 shots )

March 16	Connecticut	4 – 3	Robert Morris	Freitas Ice Forum	Recap
No Scoring		First period	10:02 - Zach Hervato (South, Jones)
(Pauly, Gerling) Cody Sharib - 01:36 (Sharib, Huson) Shawn Pauly - 12:27 (Gerke, Cooke) Joey Ferriss - 12:43		Second period	14:48 - Andrew Blazek (Hervato)
(Bouchard, Smutek) Trevor Gerling - GW - 03:01		Third period	16:17 - EA - Cody Wydo (Hervato, South)
( 19 saves / 22 shots ) Matt Grogan		Goalie stats	Eric Levine ( 26 saves / 30 shots )

Connecticut won series 2–0

=== Semifinals ===
==== (1) Niagara vs. (7) Canisius ====
March 22	Niagara	3 – 5	Canisius	Blue Cross Arena	Recap
(Murphy) Giancarlo Iuorio - 03:26		First period	10:33 - Cody Freeman (Sullivan, Gibbons); 19:21 - Ben Danford (McKellar, Gibbons)
(Kohls) Hugo Turcotte - 04:05 (Zanette, Ryan) Giancarlo Iuorio - 13:11		Second period	10:33 - Tyler Wiseman (Miller, McCrank); 19:40 - GW PP - Duncan McKellar (Wiseman, Farrell)
No scoring		Third period	01:58 - Tyler Wiseman (Miller, McCrank)
( 24 saves / 29 shots ) Carsen Chubak		Goalie stats	Tony Capobianco ( 41 saves / 44 shots )

==== (4) Connecticut vs. (6) Mercyhurst ====
March 22	Connecticut	1 – 4	Mercyhurst	Blue Cross Arena	Recap
(Sharib, Pauly) Trevor Gerling - 07:36		First period	No scoring
No scoring		Second period	09:15 - Zac Frischmon (unassisted); 15:59 - GW - Paul Chiasson (Jones, DeWald)
No scoring		Third period	13:19 - PP - Ryan Misiak (Just, Shiplo); 18:06 - EN - Paul Chiasson (Tibbett)
( 29 saves / 32 shots ) Matt Grogan		Goalie stats	Jordan Tibbett ( 31 saves / 32 shots )

=== Championship ===
==== (6) Mercuhurst vs. (7) Canisius ====
March 23	Mercuhurst	2 – 7	Canisius	Blue Cross Arena	Recap
No Scoring		First period	09:23 - Kyle Gibbons (Sullivan)
(Jones, O'Donoghue) Matthew Zay - 13:22		Second period	04:36 - PP - Kyle Gibbons (Danford, Freeman); 12:31 - GW - Ralph Cuddemi (Shupe, Grazen); 19:03 - PP - Ralph Cuddemi (Wiseman, Shupe)
(Blakey, Bahntge) Nick Jones - PP - 00:58		Third period	07:03 - Cody Freeman (Gibbons, Parker); 08:17 - Torrey Lindsay (Larsson); 14:42 - PP - Ben Parker (Gibbons, Danford)
( 20 saves / 25 shots ) Jordan Tibbett / ( 4 saves / 6 shots ) Max Strang		Goalie stats	Tony Capobianco ( 34 saves / 36 shots )

== Tournament awards ==
=== All-Tournament Team ===
- G Tony Capobianco (Canisius)
- D Ben Danford (Canisius)
- D Nick Jones (Mercyhurst)
- F Kyle Gibbons* (Canisius)
- F Tyler Wiseman (Canisius)
- F Paul Chiasson (Mercyhurst)

* Most Valuable Player(s)
