= List of Atlantic Hockey All-Tournament Teams =

The Atlantic Hockey All-Tournament Team is an honor bestowed at the conclusion of the NCAA Division I Atlantic Hockey conference tournament to the players judged to have performed the best during the championship. Currently the team is composed of three forwards, two defensemen and one goaltender with additional players named in the event of a tie.

The All-Tournament Team began being awarded after the first championship in 2004. It is a continuation of the MAAC All-Tournament Team (listed below) after Atlantic Hockey was formed after the dissolution of the MAAC ice hockey conference. During the second year of the tournament a trio of players were tabbed as the 'Three Stars of the Tournament' in lieu of naming an All-Tournament Team.

== All-Tournament Teams ==
=== MAAC Teams ===
2001
Player	Pos	Team
Peter Aubrey	G	Mercyhurst
Jody Robinson	D	Mercyhurst
	D	
Jeff Gould	F	Mercyhurst
Mike Carter	F	Mercyhurst
	F	

2002
Player	Pos	Team
Jamie Holden	G	Quinnipiac
Matt Erhart	D	Quinnipiac
Mike Muldoon	D	Mercyhurst
Matt Craig	F	Quinnipiac
Chris White	F	Quinnipiac
Louis Goulet	F	Mercyhurst

2003
Player	Pos	Team
Andy Franck	G	Mercyhurst
Mike Muldoon	D	Mercyhurst
T. J. Kemp	D	Mercyhurst
Matt Craig	F	Quinnipiac
David Wrigley	F	Mercyhurst
Dave Borrelli	F	Mercyhurst

=== 2000s ===
2004
Player	Pos	Team
Tony Quesada	G	Holy Cross
Konn Hawkes	D	Sacred Heart
R. J. Irving	D	Holy Cross
Pierre-Luc O'Brien	F	Sacred Heart
Greg Kealey	F	Holy Cross
Jeff Dams	F	Holy Cross

2005
Player	Pos	Team
Scott Champagne	Third Star	Mercyhurst
Jamie Holden	Second Star	Quinnipiac
Matt Ella	First Star	Mercyhurst

2006
Player	Pos	Team
Tony Quesada	G	Holy Cross
Jaye Judd	D	Bentley
Jamie Hunt	D	Mercyhurst
Tom Dickhudt	F	Bentley
Pierre Napert-Frenette	F	Holy Cross
James Sixsmith	F	Holy Cross

2007
Player	Pos	Team
Andrew Volkening	G	Air Force
Tim Manthey	D	Army
	D	
Mike Phillipich	F	Air Force
Bryce Hollweg	F	Army
	F	

2008
Player	Pos	Team
Andrew Volkening	G	Air Force
Matt Charbonneau	D	Air Force
Jeff Terminesi	D	Mercyhurst
Brent Olson	F	Air Force
Matt Pierce	F	Mercyhurst
Chris Risi	F	Mercyhurst

2009
Player	Pos	Team
Andrew Volkening	G	Air Force
Gregg Flynn	D	Air Force
Scott Mathis	D	Air Force
Cameron Burt	F	RIT
Matt Fairchild	F	Air Force
Scott Pitt	F	Mercyhurst

=== 2010s ===
2010
Player	Pos	Team
Jared DeMichiel	G	RIT
Dan Ringwald	D	RIT
Chris Tanev	D	RIT
Tyler Brenner	F	RIT
Patrick Knowlton	F	Sacred Heart
Cameron Burt	F	RIT

2011
Player	Pos	Team
Jason Torf	G	Air Force
Tim Kirby	D	Air Force
Scott Mathis	D	Air Force
Jacques Lamoureux	F	Air Force
Sean Murphy	F	RIT
Cole Schneider	F	Connecticut

2012
Player	Pos	Team
Jason Torf	G	Air Force
Tim Kirby	D	Air Force
Scott Mathis	D	Air Force
Taylor MacReynolds	F	RIT
Cole Gunner	F	Air Force
Paul Weisgarber	F	Air Force

2013
Player	Pos	Team
Tony Capobianco	G	Canisius
Ben Danford	D	Canisius
Nick Jones	D	Mercyhurst
Kyle Gibbons	F	Canisius
Tyler Wiseman	F	Canisius
Paul Chiasson	F	Mercyhurst

2014
Player	Pos	Team
Dalton Izyk	G	Robert Morris
Doug Jessey	D	Canisius
Chris Rumble	D	Canisius
Ralph Cuddemi	F	Robert Morris
Greg Gibson	F	Robert Morris
Cody Wydo	F	Robert Morris

2015
Player	Pos	Team
Brandon Wildung	G	Mercyhurst
Brady Norrish	D	RIT
Matt Abt	D	RIT
Matt Garbowsky	F	RIT
Brad McGowan	F	RIT
Andrew Miller	F	RIT

2016
Player	Pos	Team
Mike Rotolo	G	RIT
Chase Norrish	D	RIT
Alexander Kuqali	D	RIT
Myles Powell	F	RIT
Liam Kerins	F	RIT
David Friedmann	F	Robert Morris

2017
Player	Pos	Team
Shane Starrett	G	Air Force
John Hrabovsky	D	Air Force
	D	
Jordan Himley	F	Air Force
Tyler Ledford	F	Air Force
Brady Ferguson	F	Robert Morris

2018
Player	Pos	Team
Billy Christopoulos	G	Air Force
Zachary Mirageas	D	Air Force
Jonathan Kopacka	D	Air Force
Kyle Haak	F	Air Force
Jordan Himley	F	Air Force
Brady Ferguson	F	Robert Morris

2019
Player	Pos	Team
Zackarias Skog	G	American International
Jānis Jaks	D	American International
Ryan Polin	D	American International
Hugo Reinhardt	F	American International
Blake Christensen	F	American International
Ludwig Stenlund	F	Niagara

=== 2020s ===
2020
Player	Pos	Team
Tournament Cancelled

2021
Player	Pos	Team
Stefano Durante	G	American International
Logan Gestro	D	Canisius
Brennan Kapcheck	D	American International
Elijiah Barriga	F	American International
Justin Cole	F	American International
J. D. Pogue	F	Canisius

2022
Player	Pos	Team
Alec Calvaruso	G	American International
Brandon Koch	D	Air Force
Zak Galambos	D	American International
Blake Bennett	F	American International
Chris Dodero	F	American International
Will Gavin	F	Air Force

2023
Player	Pos	Team
Jacob Barczewski	G	Canisius
Jack Robilotti	D	Holy Cross
Jackson Decker	D	Canisius
Liam McLinskey	F	Holy Cross
Keaton Mastrodonato	F	Canisius
Nick Bowman	F	Canisius

2024
Player	Pos	Team
Tommy Scarfone	G	RIT
Gianfranco Cassaro	D	RIT
Nico Somerville	D	American International
Elijah Gonsalves	F	RIT
Tyler Fukakusa	F	RIT
Jordan Biro	F	American International

=== All-Tournament Team players by school ===
School	Winners
Air Force	29
RIT	22
American International	15
Canisius	12
Mercyhurst	10
Holy Cross	9
Robert Morris	7
Sacred Heart	3
Army	2
Bentley	2
Connecticut	1
Niagara	1
Quinnipiac	1

=== Multiple appearances ===
Player	All-Tournament Team appearances
Scott Mathis	3
Andrew Volkening	3
Jordan Himley	2
Brady Ferguson	2
Tim Kirby	2
Tony Quesada	2
Jason Torf	2

== See also ==
- Atlantic Hockey Awards
- Atlantic Hockey Most Valuable Player in Tournament
