= Atlantic Hockey Individual Sportsmanship Award =

- Sport: Ice hockey
- Awarded for: The player best exemplifying the qualities of sportsmanship in the Atlantic Hockey Association

History
- First award: 2004
- Final award: 2024
- Most recent: Braeden Tuck

The Atlantic Hockey Individual Sportsmanship Award was an annual award given out at the conclusion of the Atlantic Hockey regular season to the player best exemplifying the qualities of sportsmanship in the conference as voted by the coaches of each Atlantic Hockey team.

Braeden Tuck is the only player to win the award more than once (as of 2024).

== Award winners ==
Year	Winner	Position	School
2003–04	Tim Coskren	Forward	Holy Cross
2004–05	Chris Garceau	Center	Army
2005–06	Tyler McGregor	Right wing	Holy Cross
2006–07	James Sixsmith	Left wing	Holy Cross
2007–08	Alexandre Parent	Center	Sacred Heart
2008–09	Anthony Canzoneri	Forward	Bentley
2009–10	Chris Risi	Forward	Mercyhurst
2010–11	Furman South	Forward	Robert Morris
2011–12	Mark Cornacchia	Right wing	RIT
2012–13	Eric Delong	Forward	Sacred Heart
2013–14	Jason Fabian	Forward	Air Force
2013–14	Nick Jones	Defenceman	Mercyhurst

Year	Winner	Position	School
2014–15	Zak Zaremba	Right wing	Army
2015–16	Ben Carey	Forward	Air Force
2016–17	Ryan Nick	Defenceman	Army
2017–18	Bryan Sienerth	Center	Mercyhurst
2018–19	Dylan McLaughlin	Forward	Canisius
2019–20	Alex Wilkinson	Defenceman	Army
2020–21	Justin Cole	Forward	American International
2020–21	Nick Jenny	Defenceman	Robert Morris
2021–22	Daniel Haider	Forward	Army
2022–23	Braeden Tuck	Forward	Sacred Heart
2023–24	Braeden Tuck	Forward	Sacred Heart

=== Winners by school ===
School	Winners
Army	5
Holy Cross	3
Sacred Heart	4
Mercyhurst	3
Air Force	2
Robert Morris	2
American International	1
Bentley	1
Canisius	1
RIT	1

=== Winners by position ===
Position	Winners
Center	3
Right wing	3
Left wing	1
Forward	12
Defenceman	3
Goaltender	0
