= Nikita Guslistov =

Russian ice hockey player (born 2002)

- Born: 30 May 2002 (age 24) Cherepovets, Russia
- Height: 5 ft 10 in (178 cm)
- Weight: 174 lb (79 kg; 12 st 6 lb)
- Position: Forward
- Shoots: Left
- KHL team Former teams: HC Sochi; Severstal Cherepovets; Dinamo Minsk; Admiral Vladivostok
- NHL draft: 209th overall, 2021; Carolina Hurricanes
- Playing career: 2020–present

Nikita Sergeyevich Guslistov (Russian: Никита Сергеевич Гуслистов; born 30 May 2002) is a Russian professional ice hockey player for HC Sochi of the Kontinental Hockey League (KHL).

== Playing career ==
Guslistov made his professional debut for Severstal Cherepovets during the 2020–21 season. At 18-years old, 242 days, he became the youngest player ever to captain a KHL team, surpassing the previous record held by Vladimir Tarasenko. He also became the youngest player to ever score a hat-trick for Cherepovets. He was drafted in the seventh round, 209th overall, by the Carolina Hurricanes in the 2021 NHL entry draft.

After four seasons with Severstal Cherepovets and out of contract with the club, Guslistov's rights were traded to Belarusian KHL club, Dinamo Minsk in exchange for the right to Joseph Duszak on 17 July 2024. He was signed to a two-year, two-way contract with Dinamo two days later on 19 July 2024.

Guslistov played out the 2024–25 season in a brief stint with Admiral Vladivostok before leaving as a free agent in the off-season to sign a contract with VHL club, Metallurg Novokuznetsk on 25 July 2025. After a full season in the VHL, Guslistov secured a KHL contract for the 2026-27 season, signing with HC Sochi on 24 June 2026.

== International play ==
Guslistov played for Russia at the 2022 World Junior Ice Hockey Championships. He played two games before the tournament was cancelled and voided due to the COVID-19 pandemic.

== Career statistics ==
			Regular season					Playoffs
Season	Team	League	GP	G	A	Pts	PIM	GP	G	A	Pts	PIM
2019–20	Almaz Cherepovets	MHL	56	9	7	16	4	4	0	0	0	0
2020–21	Almaz Cherepovets	MHL	23	14	8	22	2	3	0	1	1	2
2020–21	Severstal Cherepovets	KHL	28	5	2	7	0	5	1	1	2	0
2021–22	Severstal Cherepovets	KHL	34	6	7	13	2	7	0	2	2	2
2021–22	Almaz Cherepovets	MHL	—	—	—	—	—	1	0	0	0	0
2022–23	Severstal Cherepovets	KHL	52	4	11	15	8	7	1	0	1	0
2023–24	Severstal Cherepovets	KHL	26	0	1	1	0	4	0	0	0	0
2023–24	Buran Voronezh	VHL	8	2	3	5	0	2	0	2	2	0
2024–25	Dinamo Minsk	KHL	9	0	0	0	2	—	—	—	—	—
2024–25	HK Brest	BLR	14	2	4	6	8	—	—	—	—	—
2024–25	Admiral Vladivostok	KHL	4	0	0	0	0	—	—	—	—	—
2024–25	Dynamo-Altay Barnaul	VHL	11	4	4	8	0	—	—	—	—	—
2025–26	Metallurg Novokuznetsk	VHL	59	13	6	19	4	17	3	3	6	0
KHL totals			153	15	21	36	12	23	2	3	5	2
