= Atlantic Hockey Best Defenseman =

- Sport: Ice hockey
- Awarded for: The Best Defenseman in the Atlantic Hockey Association

History
- First award: 2004
- Final award: 2024
- Most recent: Brian Kramer

The Atlantic Hockey Best Defenseman was an annual award given out at the conclusion of the Atlantic Hockey regular season to the best defenseman in the conference as voted by the coaches of each Atlantic Hockey team.

== Award winners ==
Year	Winner	School
2003–04	T. J. Kemp	Mercyhurst
2004–05	Conrad Martin	Mercyhurst
2005–06	Rob Godfrey	Holy Cross
2006–07	Jon Landry	Holy Cross
2007–08	Zach McKelvie	Army
2008–09	Greg Flynn	Air Force
2009–10	Dan Ringwald	RIT
2010–11	Denny Urban	Robert Morris
2011–12	Tim Kirby	Air Force
2012–13	Adam McKenzie	Air Force
2013–14	Nick Jones	Mercyhurst
2014–15	Steven Weinstein	Bentley

Year	Winner	School
2015–16	Chase Norrish	RIT
2016–17	Lester Lancaster	Mercyhurst
2016–17	Cameron Heath	Canisius
2017–18	Alexander Wilkinson	Army
2018–19	Joseph Duszak	Mercyhurst
2019–20	Mike Lee	Sacred Heart
2020–21	Brennan Kapcheck	American International
2020–21	Nick Jenny	Robert Morris
2021–22	Zak Galambos	American International
2022–23	Aiden Hansen-Bukata	RIT
2023–24	Brian Kramer	American International

=== Winners by school ===
School	Winners
Mercyhurst	5
Air Force	3
American International	3
RIT	3
Army	2
Holy Cross	2
Robert Morris	2
Bentley	1
Canisius	1
Sacred Heart	1
