= Nick Jones (ice hockey) =

American ice hockey player (born 1990)

- Born: June 26, 1990 (age 35) Cranberry, Pennsylvania, U.S.
- Height: 6 ft 2 in (188 cm)
- Weight: 200 lb (91 kg; 14 st 4 lb)
- Position: Defense
- Shot: Right
- Played for: Worcester Sharks; Stjernen Hockey; HC Plzeň; Grizzlys Wolfsburg
- NHL draft: Undrafted
- Playing career: 2014–2020

Nick Jones (born June 26, 1990) is an American former professional ice hockey defenseman.

== Career ==
Jones played collegiate hockey for the Mercyhurst Lakers in the NCAA Men's Division I Atlantic Hockey conference. In his junior year, Jones was named to the 2012–13 All-AHA First Team.

On August 27, 2014, Jones signed his first professional contract, a one-year deal, with the Worcester Sharks of the AHL. Prior to the 2014–15 season, he was assigned to ECHL club, the Indy Fuel.

On September 3, 2015, Jones signed a one-year contract with ECHL's reigning champions, the South Carolina Stingrays. In the 2015–16 season, Jones registered 19 points in 52 games from the blueline.

On June 26, 2016, Jones agreed to a one-year deal with Norwegian club, Stjernen Hockey, of the GET-ligaen.

On May 1, 2017, Jones signed an initial one-year contract with the HC Plzeň of the Czech Extraliga. Following his second season with Plzeň in 2018–19, Jones left the Czech Republic to sign a one-year contract as a free agent with German club, Grizzlys Wolfsburg of the DEL on June 4, 2019.

== Career statistics ==
			Regular season					Playoffs
Season	Team	League	GP	G	A	Pts	PIM	GP	G	A	Pts	PIM
2008–09	New Jersey Hitmen	EJHL	40	4	12	16	17	5	0	2	2	0
2009–10	New Jersey Hitmen	EJHL	42	5	17	22	17	3	0	2	2	2
2010–11	Mercyhurst University	NCAA	34	5	5	10	8	—	—	—	—	—
2011–12	Mercyhurst University	NCAA	40	10	14	24	10	—	—	—	—	—
2012–13	Mercyhurst University	NCAA	41	7	19	26	6	—	—	—	—	—
2013–14	Mercyhurst University	NCAA	41	10	23	33	14	—	—	—	—	—
2013–14	Worcester Sharks	AHL	2	0	0	0	0	—	—	—	—	—
2013–14	Ontario Reign	ECHL	—	—	—	—	—	4	0	1	1	0
2014–15	Worcester Sharks	AHL	14	0	2	2	2	—	—	—	—	—
2014–15	Indy Fuel	ECHL	45	7	17	24	10	—	—	—	—	—
2015–16	South Carolina Stingrays	ECHL	52	6	13	19	18	17	2	4	6	2
2008–09	Stjernen Hockey	Norway	43	6	15	21	32	4	1	0	1	0
2017–18	HC Plzeň	Czech	51	6	5	11	38	10	0	3	3	2
2018–19	HC Plzeň	Czech	42	6	8	14	32	14	0	8	8	0
2019–20	Grizzlys Wolfsburg	DEL	52	4	7	11	54	—	—	—	—	—
AHL totals			16	0	2	2	2	—	—	—	—	—
ECHL totals			97	13	30	43	28	21	2	5	7	2
Czech totals			93	12	13	25	70	24	0	11	11	2
DEL totals			52	4	7	11	54	—	—	—	—	—
Norway totals			43	6	15	21	32	4	1	0	1	0

== Awards and honors ==
Award	Year
All-Atlantic Hockey Third Team	2011–12
All-Atlantic Hockey First Team	2012–13
Atlantic Hockey All-Tournament Team	2013
Atlantic Hockey Top Defenseman	2013–14
All-Atlantic Hockey First Team	2013–14

Awards and achievements
Preceded by Adam McKenzie	Atlantic Hockey Best Defenseman; 2013–14	Succeeded by Steven Weinstein
Preceded by Eric Delong	Atlantic Hockey Individual Sportsmanship Award (co-winner with Jason Fabian); 2013–14	Succeeded by Zak Zaremba
