= Joseph Duszak =

American ice hockey player

- Born: July 22, 1997 (age 29) Franklin Square, New York, U.S.
- Height: 5 ft 10 in (178 cm)
- Weight: 185 lb (84 kg; 13 st 3 lb)
- Position: Defense
- Shoots: Right
- DEL team Former teams: Straubing Tigers; Toronto Marlies; Dinamo Minsk; Springfield Thunderbirds; Severstal Cherepovets; Kunlun Red Star; Shanghai Dragons; Neftekhimik Nizhnekamsk
- NHL draft: Undrafted
- Playing career: 2019–present

Joseph Duszak (born July 22, 1997) is an American professional ice hockey defenceman for the Straubing Tigers of the Deutsche Eishockey Liga (DEL).

== Playing career ==
=== Amateur ===
At the age of 15, Duszak joined the P.A.L. Junior Islanders of the United States Premier Hockey League (USPHL). During the 2014–15 season, Duszak committed to attend Mercyhurst University and play for the Mercyhurst Lakers Division 1 men's ice hockey team.

In his last season with the Junior Islanders, Duszak was named the 2016 USPHL Player of the Year after ending the 2015–16 year with 60 points. He was also named USPHL Premier Defenseman of the Year. Although he played two games for the Chicago Steel of the United States Hockey League, Duszak eventually returned to the USPHL.

In his freshman year at Mercyhurst, he played in 29 games and ended the season with 5 goals and 16 assists. In his sophomore season, Duszak tallied 9 goals and 22 assists in 35 games. At the end of the season, he was named to the Atlantic Hockey Association's All-Conference Second Team and Mercyhurst's Top Defenseman.

In his final year with the Mercyhurst Lakers, he had a break out season. Duszak led the team with 16 goals and recorded his first career hat trick in a 4–3 win over the Holy Cross Crusaders. With his assistance, the Mercyhurst Lakers jumped from sixth in the conference to fourth. He led all the Atlantic Hockey conference defenseman in points and tied for the league lead in points and assists. As a result, he was named the Atlantic Hockey Player of the Year and Atlantic Hockey Best Defenseman. Duszak was also nominated for the Hobey Baker Award as the top National Collegiate Athletic Association men's ice hockey player and selected for the AHCA All-America Second Team. He was also named to the All-Atlantic Hockey First Team. As a result of his play, the Toronto Maple Leafs signed Duszak to a two-year entry-level contract.

=== Professional ===
On May 3, 2019, Duszak recorded his first career AHL goal in a win over the Cleveland Monsters. In June 2019, Duszak was invited to the Toronto Maple Leafs Development Camp. After attending the Maple Leafs training camp, he was reassigned to the Toronto Marlies for the 2019–20 season. He subsequently joined their ECHL team, the Newfoundland Growlers, for their training camp and made their opening night roster. On November 12, he was recalled to the AHL but demoted shortly thereafter.

On August 30, 2022, Duszak signed a one-year contract with HC Dinamo Minsk of the Kontinental Hockey League (KHL) after failing to make the Leafs during his 3-year tenure in the Leafs organization.

Following a successful season with Minsk, Duszak opted to return to North America in securing a one-year AHL contract with the Springfield Thunderbirds, the primary affiliate to the St. Louis Blues, on July 6, 2023.

As a free agent from the Blues, Duszak's KHL rights were traded by Dinamo Minsk to Russian club, Severstal Cherepovets in exchange for prospect Nikita Guslistov on July 17, 2024.

In 2024, Duszak signed with Severstal Cherepovets of the KHL and was later moved to Kunlun Red Star in exchange for monetary compensation. After registering 18 points through 35 appearances to close out the season, Duszak remained with the newly rebranded organization in signing a one-year contract extension with the Shanghai Dragons on August 19, 2025.

As a free agent following his third KHL season, Duszak opted to sign a contract in Germany by agreeing to a one-year deal with Straubing Tigers of the DEL, on May 6, 2026.

== Career statistics ==
			Regular season					Playoffs
Season	Team	League	GP	G	A	Pts	PIM	GP	G	A	Pts	PIM
2013–14	P.A.L. Junior Islanders	USPHL	34	1	16	17	22	—	—	—	—	—
2014–15	P.A.L. Junior Islanders	USPHL	50	18	39	57	74	2	1	1	2	2
2015–16	P.A.L. Junior Islanders	USPHL	42	14	46	60	107	2	2	2	4	14
2015–16	Chicago Steel	USHL	2	0	1	1	0	—	—	—	—	—
2016–17	Mercyhurst College	AHA	29	5	16	21	34	—	—	—	—	—
2017–18	Mercyhurst College	AHA	35	9	22	31	22	—	—	—	—	—
2018–19	Mercyhurst College	AHA	37	16	31	47	42	—	—	—	—	—
2018–19	Toronto Marlies	AHL	2	0	0	0	2	4	1	0	1	0
2019–20	Newfoundland Growlers	ECHL	34	9	26	35	34	—	—	—	—	—
2019–20	Toronto Marlies	AHL	23	3	15	18	24	—	—	—	—	—
2020–21	Toronto Marlies	AHL	25	4	8	12	8	—	—	—	—	—
2021–22	Toronto Marlies	AHL	61	7	45	52	62	—	—	—	—	—
2022–23	Dinamo Minsk	KHL	68	9	36	45	60	3	0	0	0	8
2023–24	Springfield Thunderbirds	AHL	60	9	29	38	63	—	—	—	—	—
2024–25	Severstal Cherepovets	KHL	9	1	3	4	2	—	—	—	—	—
2024–25	Kunlun Red Star	KHL	35	3	15	18	57	—	—	—	—	—
2025–26	Shanghai Dragons	KHL	16	0	8	8	10	—	—	—	—	—
2025–26	Neftekhimik Nizhnekamsk	KHL	23	0	5	5	24	—	—	—	—	—
AHL totals			171	23	97	120	159	4	1	0	1	0
KHL totals			151	13	67	80	153	3	0	0	0	8

== Awards and honors ==
Award	Year
USPHL
USPHL Player of the Year	2015–16
USPHL Premier Defenseman of the Year	2015–16
College
Atlantic Hockey Association's All-Conference Second Team	2017–18
Atlantic Hockey Best Defenseman	2018–19
Atlantic Hockey Player of the Year	2018–19
All-Atlantic Hockey First Team	2018–19
AHCA All-America Second Team	2018–19
HCA National Player of the Month	November 2019
AHA Defensive Player of the Week	November 2019
ECHL
All-Rookie Team	2019–20
AHL
Second All-Star Team	2021–22

Awards and achievements
Preceded by Dylan McLaughlin	Atlantic Hockey Player of the Year; 2018–19	Succeeded by Jason Cotton
