= Derek Barach =

American ice hockey player

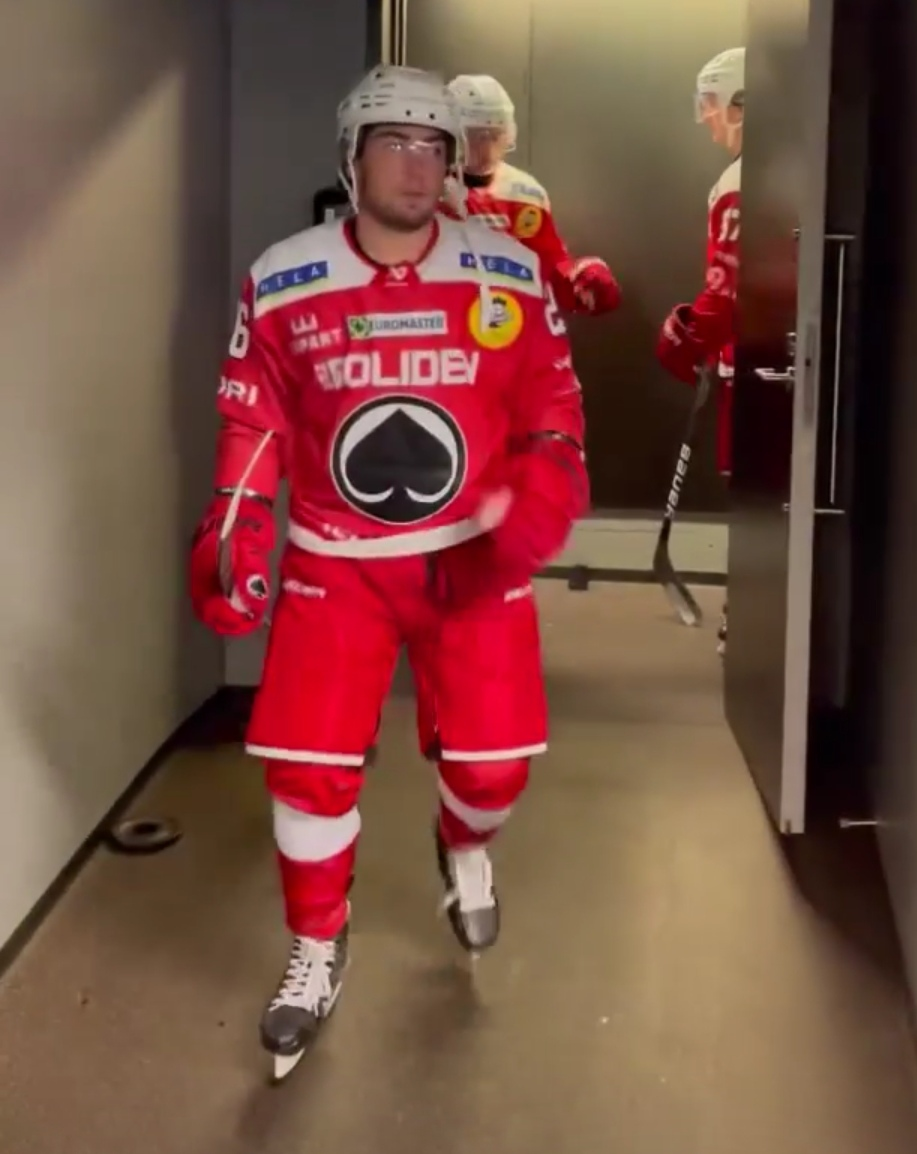
- Born: February 27, 1995 (age 31) Glenmont, New York, U.S.
- Height: 5 ft 8 in (173 cm)
- Weight: 165 lb (75 kg; 11 st 11 lb)
- Position: Center
- Shoots: Right
- KHL team Former teams: CSKA Moscow; Cleveland Monsters; Texas Stars; Porin Ässät; HC Vityaz; Metallurg Magnitogorsk
- NHL draft: Undrafted
- Playing career: 2019–present

Derek Barach (born February 27, 1995) is an American ice hockey player who currently plays for HC CSKA Moscow of the Kontinental Hockey League (KHL). He plays as a centre.

== Playing career ==
=== Junior ===
Derek began his ice hockey career as a young child playing for the CD Selects, a junior A team in Albany New York. He played High School Hockey for the Bethlehem Central High School Eagles, The Albany Academy Cadets, and the Salisbury School Crimson Knights. He also played junior hockey with the Neponset Valley River Rats, Lone Star Brahmas, and Green Bay Gamblers.

=== College ===
Barach spent four years at college playing for the Mercyhurst Lakers, where he served two years as captain.

=== Professional ===
After completion of his college degree, Barach signed his first professional contract with the Cleveland Monsters of the American Hockey League on March 10, 2019.

Barach signed a 2-year contract to Porin Ässät covering the seasons 2021–22 and 2022–23. Barach played his first Liiga game on October 10, 2021. On October 15 Barach scored his first Liiga goal with a hat trick in a game against KalPa, overall he scored 4 goals in that game. Barach played 56 matches with 32 points. In the 2022–23 season Barach played 58 matches with 28 points.

On June 28, 2023 it was announced that Barach had signed a one-year contract with the HC Vityaz of the KHL.

Barach was amongst Vityaz's offensive leader through two seasons with the club, leaving as a free agent following their withdrawal from the KHL to sign a one-year contract with Metallurg Magnitogorsk for the 2025–26 season on June 11, 2025. He continued his offensive output with Metallurg, helping the club claim the Kharlamov division in posting 21 goals and 40 points through 62 regular season games.

As a free agent, Barach left Metallurg to continue in the KHL with CSKA Moscow on a two-year contract on June 1, 2026.

== Personal life ==
Barach's father, Scott, played NCAA Division III hockey with Rochester Institute of Technology.

== Career statistics ==
			Regular season					Playoffs
Season	Team	League	GP	G	A	Pts	PIM	GP	G	A	Pts	PIM
2010–11	Albany Academy Cadets	NEPSAC	36	7	9	16	—	—	—	—	—	—
2011–12	Albany Academy Cadets	NEPSAC	31	19	34	53	—	—	—	—	—	—
2012–13	Salisbury Crimson Knights	NEPSAC	29	10	9	19	—	—	—	—	—	—
2013–14	Salisbury Crimson Knights	NEPSAC	29	23	33	56	—	—	—	—	—	—
2013–14	Lone Star Brahmas	NAHL	2	1	0	1	0	—	—	—	—	—
2014–15	Green Bay Gamblers	USHL	55	11	7	18	32	—	—	—	—	—
2015–16	Mercyhurst Lakers	NCAA	36	10	22	32	44	—	—	—	—	—
2016–17	Mercyhurst Lakers	NCAA	39	9	28	37	34	—	—	—	—	—
2017–18	Mercyhurst Lakers	NCAA	37	15	23	38	54	—	—	—	—	—
2018–19	Mercyhurst Lakers	NCAA	38	15	22	37	28	—	—	—	—	—
2018–19	Cleveland Monsters	AHL	15	7	4	11	6	8	1	0	1	2
2019–20	Cleveland Monsters	AHL	47	7	6	13	36	—	—	—	—	—
2019–20	Jacksonville Icemen	ECHL	2	1	2	3	0	—	—	—	—	—
2020–21	Texas Stars	AHL	31	3	4	7	20	—	—	—	—	—
2020–21	Indy Fuel	AHL	7	3	4	7	4	—	—	—	—	—
2021–22	Porin Ässät	Liiga	56	18	14	32	56	—	—	—	—	—
2022–23	Porin Ässät	Liiga	58	15	13	28	59	8	1	5	6	10
2023–24	HC Vityaz	KHL	68	10	25	35	51	—	—	—	—	—
2024–25	HC Vityaz	KHL	68	21	22	43	52	—	—	—	—	—
2025–26	Metallurg Magnitogorsk	KHL	62	21	19	40	44	15	2	4	6	14
AHL totals			93	17	14	31	62	8	1	0	1	2
Liiga totals			114	33	27	60	115	8	1	5	6	10
KHL totals			198	52	66	118	147	15	2	4	6	14
