= Jamie Hunt (ice hockey) =

Canadian ice hockey player

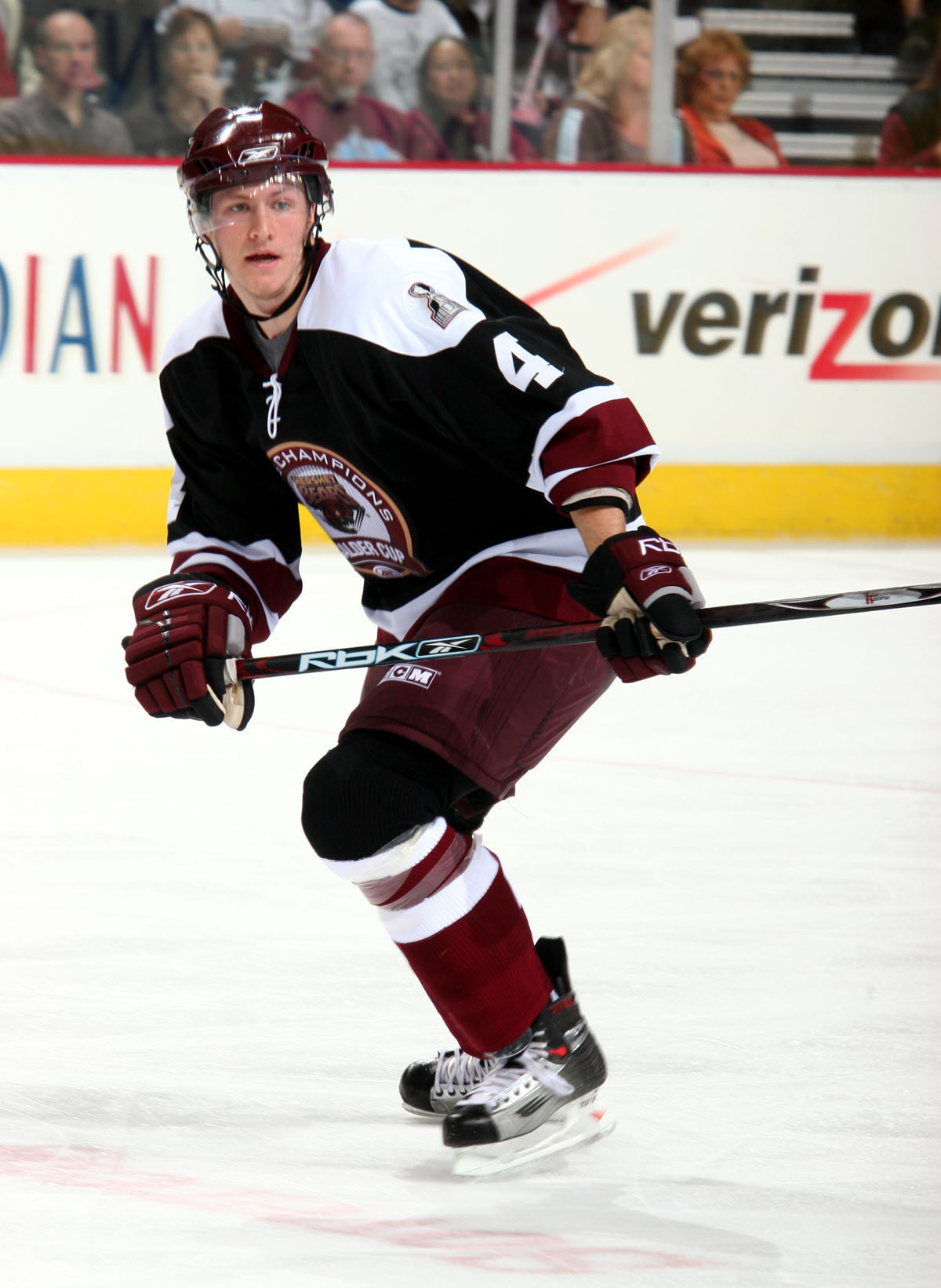
- Hunt with the Hershey Bears in 2006
- Born: April 20, 1984 (age 42) Calgary, Alberta, Canada
- Height: 6 ft 2 in (188 cm)
- Weight: 195 lb (88 kg; 13 st 13 lb)
- Position: Defence
- Shot: Left
- Played for: Washington Capitals
- NHL draft: Undrafted
- Playing career: 2006–2011

Jameson Hunt (born April 20, 1984) is a Canadian former professional ice hockey defenceman who played one game for the Washington Capitals of the National Hockey League (NHL).

== Playing career ==
Undrafted, Jamie signed as a free agent with the Washington Capitals from Mercyhurst College. He played a solitary game in the NHL in the 2006–07 season with the Capitals.

On August 18, 2009, Hunt returned to North America from a season in Germany with Augsburger Panther to sign a one-year contract with the Chicago Wolves of the American Hockey League. After scoring 17 points in 42 games, despite enduring injury, Hunt re-signed to a one-year contract with the Wolves on August 3, 2010.

After playing 27 games in the 2010–11 season with the Wolves, Hunt was released from his contract and signed with Austrian team, Graz 99ers, for the remainder of the year on January 31, 2011.

Jamie was also a lacrosse player, playing for the Okotoks Raiders in the Alberta Jr. A Lacrosse League.

== Career statistics ==
			Regular season					Playoffs
Season	Team	League	GP	G	A	Pts	PIM	GP	G	A	Pts	PIM
2002–03	Calgary Canucks	AJHL	63	8	20	28	35	—	—	—	—	—
2003–04	Mercyhurst College	AH	27	3	16	19	4	—	—	—	—	—
2004–05	Mercyhurst College	AH	38	5	12	17	36	—	—	—	—	—
2005–06	Mercyhurst College	AH	33	12	33	45	49	—	—	—	—	—
2006–07	Hershey Bears	AHL	36	2	10	12	33	—	—	—	—	—
2006–07	Washington Capitals	NHL	1	0	0	0	0	—	—	—	—	—
2007–08	Hershey Bears	AHL	60	4	9	13	30	4	0	0	0	0
2008–09	Augsburger Panther	DEL	50	4	21	25	57	4	1	0	1	4
2009–10	Chicago Wolves	AHL	42	6	11	17	17	—	—	—	—	—
2010–11	Chicago Wolves	AHL	27	2	4	6	14	—	—	—	—	—
2010–11	Graz 99ers	EBEL	10	0	2	2	4	4	1	1	2	0
AHL totals			165	14	34	48	94	4	0	0	0	0
NHL totals			1	0	0	0	0	—	—	—	—	—

== Awards and honours ==
Award	Year
All-Atlantic Hockey Rookie Team	2003-04
All-Atlantic Hockey First Team	2005-06
Atlantic Hockey All-Tournament Team	2006

== See also ==
- List of players who played only one game in the NHL
