= T. J. Kemp =

Canadian ice hockey player (born 1981)

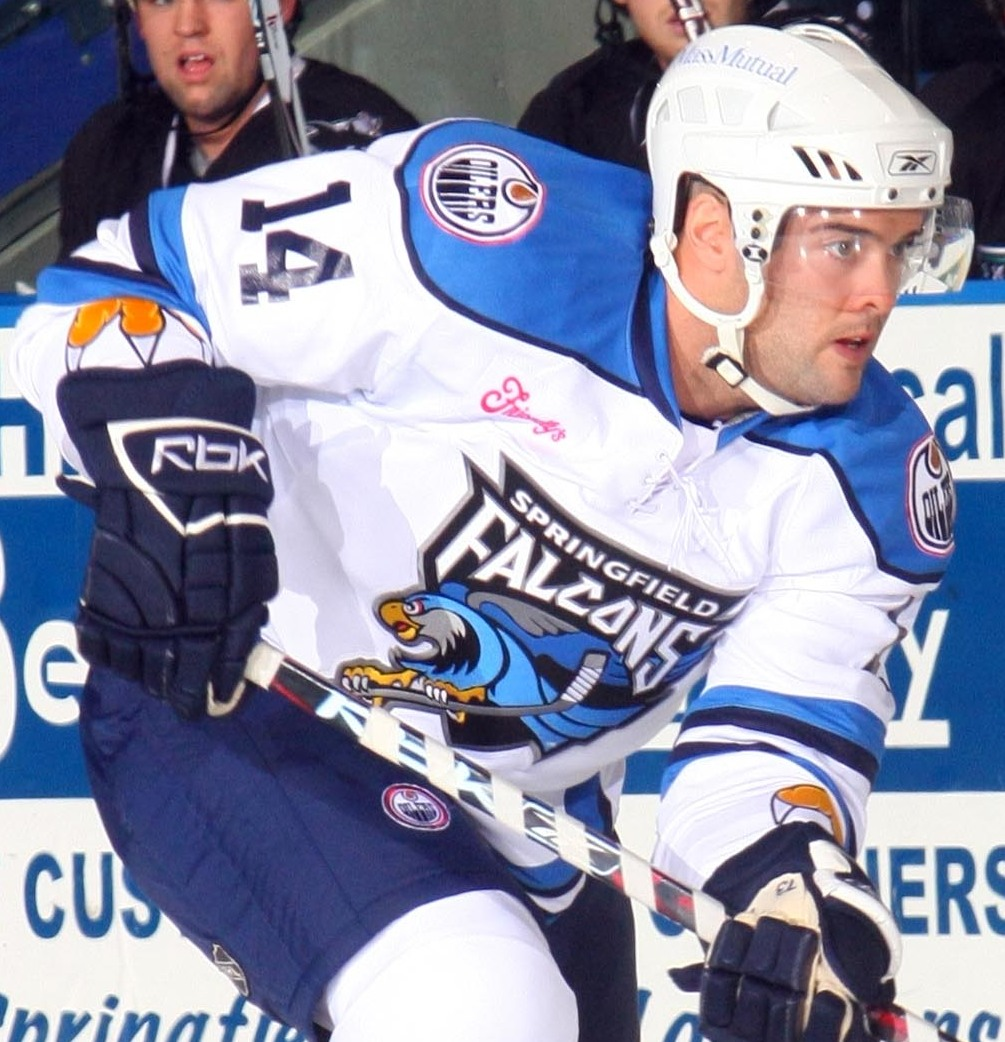
- Kemp with the Springfield Falcons in 2007
- Born: July 3, 1981 (age 44) Pickering, Ontario, Canada
- Height: 5 ft 11 in (180 cm)
- Weight: 197 lb (89 kg; 14 st 1 lb)
- Position: Defence
- Shot: Left
- Played for: Peoria Rivermen; Iowa Stars; Milwaukee Admirals; Bridgeport Sound Tigers; Manchester Monarchs; Springfield Falcons; Wilkes-Barre/Scranton Penguins; Hamilton Bulldogs; Augsburger Panther; Thomas Sabo Ice Tigers; Ritten-Renon; Oji Eagles
- Playing career: 2005–2015

T.J. Kemp (born July 3, 1981) is a Canadian former professional ice hockey defenceman.

== Playing career ==
Kemp played hockey at Mercyhurst College from 2001 to 2005. After graduating he played for the Missouri River Otters of the UHL. He then played for the Reading Royals of the ECHL before playing for a large numbers of teams in the AHL including the Peoria Rivermen, Iowa Stars, Milwaukee Admirals, Bridgeport Sound Tigers, Manchester Monarchs, and Springfield Falcons.

On July 8, 2008, Kemp signed a one-year contract with the Pittsburgh Penguins. After 22 games with AHL affiliate, Wilkes-Barre/Scranton Penguins, Kemp was traded by Pittsburgh to the Montreal for a conditional draft pick on January 5, 2009. He was then assigned to the Hamilton Bulldogs of the AHL.

On July 14, 2010, Kemp was not offered a new contract with Augsburger Panther and was signed by fellow DEL team, Thomas Sabo Ice Tigers for the 2010–11 season.

After a season in the Italian Serie A with Ritten-Renon, Kemp signed a one-year contract abroad with Oji Eagles of the Asian League Ice Hockey on August 9, 2013.

== Career statistics ==
			Regular season					Playoffs
Season	Team	League	GP	G	A	Pts	PIM	GP	G	A	Pts	PIM
2001–02	Mercyhurst College	MAAC	31	6	13	19	18	—	—	—	—	—
2002–03	Mercyhurst College	MAAC	37	11	16	27	39	—	—	—	—	—
2003–04	Mercyhurst College	AHA	34	5	21	26	42	—	—	—	—	—
2004–05	Mercyhurst College	AHA	31	10	18	28	78	—	—	—	—	—
2004–05	Missouri River Otters	UHL	6	1	2	3	4	—	—	—	—	—
2005–06	Reading Royals	ECHL	60	13	27	40	54	4	1	1	2	2
2005–06	Peoria Rivermen	AHL	3	0	0	0	2	—	—	—	—	—
2005–06	Iowa Stars	AHL	3	0	0	0	0	—	—	—	—	—
2005–06	Milwaukee Admirals	AHL	2	0	0	0	2	—	—	—	—	—
2005–06	Bridgeport Sound Tigers	AHL	6	0	0	0	0	—	—	—	—	—
2006–07	Manchester Monarchs	AHL	65	5	33	38	56	14	2	5	7	12
2007–08	Springfield Falcons	AHL	73	8	38	46	44	—	—	—	—	—
2008–09	Wilkes-Barre/Scranton Penguins	AHL	22	1	8	9	22	—	—	—	—	—
2008–09	Hamilton Bulldogs	AHL	45	1	17	18	18	5	0	0	0	4
2009–10	Augsburger Panther	DEL	54	9	23	32	54	14	2	3	5	8
2010–11	Thomas Sabo Ice Tigers	DEL	50	7	15	22	38	1	0	0	0	0
2011–12	Thomas Sabo Ice Tigers	DEL	48	5	5	10	40	—	—	—	—	—
2012–13	Ritten-Renon	Serie A	43	8	29	37	54	7	2	2	4	6
2013–14	Oji Eagles	AL	35	5	18	23	40	7	2	4	6	10
2014–15	Whitby Dunlops	ACH	5	1	5	6	18	—	—	—	—	—
AHL totals			219	15	96	111	144	19	2	5	7	16

== Awards and honours ==
Award	Year
All-MAAC Rookie Team	2002
All-MAAC Second Team	2003
All-Atlantic Hockey First Team	2004
All-Atlantic Hockey First Team	2005

Awards and achievements
Preceded by Award Created	Atlantic Hockey Best Defenseman; 2003–04	Succeeded by Conrad Martin
