= Mercyhurst Lakers men's ice hockey =

- Current season
- University: Mercyhurst University
- Arena: Mercyhurst Ice Center; Erie, Pennsylvania
- Colors: Forest green and navy blue

NCAA tournament runner-up
- DII: 1993, 1995

NCAA tournament appearances
- DI: 2001, 2003, 2005; DII: 1993, 1995; DIII: 1991

Conference tournament champions
- ECAC West: 1995; MAAC: 2001, 2003; AHA: 2005

Conference regular season champions
- ECAC West: 1995; MAAC: 2001, 2002, 2003; AHA: 2014, 2018

Current uniform

The Mercyhurst Lakers men's ice hockey team was a National Collegiate Athletic Association (NCAA) hockey team that represented Mercyhurst University in Erie, Pennsylvania. The team was a Division I hockey team playing out of the Mercyhurst Ice Center located on the school campus. The Mercyhurst Lakers started out as a club sport at the school, moving up to Division III, followed by Division II. They joined the Metro Atlantic Athletic Conference in 1999, stepping up into Division I and won their conference tournament three times, making NCAA tournament appearances in 2001, 2003, and 2005. They competed in Atlantic Hockey America, formed shortly after the 2023–24 season by the merger of the Lakers' former home, the Atlantic Hockey Association, with College Hockey America.

== History ==
=== Club Sport ===
Chris Cuzzola, who was a student at Mercyhurst playing club hockey at Gannon University, happened to talk to former president of Mercyhurst University, William Garvey, about hockey. As a result of this, hockey would be instated as a club sport competing in the Erie Senior Hockey League for the 1986–1987 season. The coach for the first club season was Bob Cisek who was a Mercyhurst professor at the time. At the club level in the Erie Senior Hockey League, the Lakers went 15-0-3, finishing first in the league.

=== Division II & Division III ===
After just 1 year at the club level, the Mercyhurst Lakers began an independent trial run at the varsity level, Division III in the Eastern Collegiate Athletic Conference (ECAC) South hockey league. Mercyhurst Athletic Director John Leisering stated, “The administration was immediately enthusiastic about a possible move to varsity status and with the support of the hockey people, the move was approved after just a few months.”

Named head coach for the Lakers in their first season at the Division III level was Fred Lane. Lane was one of the founding members for the Gannon University Golden Knights club hockey and was affiliated with the Gannon hockey program since 1967. As a player, he was Most Valuable Player his sophomore, junior, and senior years and coached the team in 1973 returning in 1978. In 10 seasons as the head coach for the Golden Knights, Lane had a record of 153–14–14, winning 2 Western Pennsylvania College Hockey Association league championships, 6 division championships, and was named WPCHA coach of the year 3 times. In addition to coaching, he was a member of the Amateur Hockey Association of the United States (AHAUS) and the Ontario Coaches Association.

Along with Head Coach Fred Lane, was Associate Coach Bob Cisek who ran the program a year ago at the club level. For the 1987–1988 season, the Lakers had a very competitive schedule in their first season as a Division III team playing a combination of both club and varsity teams. The Lakers opened up their first NCAA Division III season on Saturday, October 31 at West Chester University playing their home games at both the Erie Civic Center and Glenwood Ice Rink. The highlight of the season being the game against Division I Notre Dame Fighting Irish men's ice hockey on November 25 which they lost 7–3. With 18 of the 28 players being freshmen on the team, Mercyhurst Lakers ended their first varsity season going 16–7–0.

Following the 1987–1988 season, on April 29 of 1988, Mercyhurst College Athletic Director John Leisering named Rick Gotkin as head coach of the team saying, “Rick’s playing, coaching, and recruiting credentials were just the mix Mercyhurst was looking for.” At 28 years of age, Rick Gotkin comes from the Rensselaer Polytechnic Institute, which played at the Division I level in the Eastern Collegiate Athletic Conference where Gotkin served as Assistant Varsity Hockey Coach for the past 2 years (1986–1988). Before Rensselaer Polytechnic Institute, Gotkin was a coach at SUNY-Brockport (Division III), coached the Enschede Lions in the Netherlands, was head coach at SUNY-Canton (NCAA-Junior College), and was head coach of the Fife Flyers of the British Hockey League. After coaching Rensselaer, was hired as head coach for the Mercyhurst Lakers.

For the 1988–1989 season, the Mercyhurst Lakers played in the ECAC-West Division alongside SUNY-Brockport, Canisius College, SUNY-Fredonia, SUNY-Potsdam and St. Bonaventure University. In the Lakers first full season as an NCAA Division III program, the Lakers took a record of 11–1–1 under new Head Coach Rick Gotkin. The first time the Lakers would be ranked was in the 1990–1991 season where they ranked 9th in the short history of the team. During the 1991–1992, the Mercyhurst Lakers opened up their new rink on campus, the Mercyhurst Ice Center. According to the first Division II poll released, the Mercyhurst Lakers ranked 2nd in the 1992–1993 season only behind Bemidji State University. In that season, the Lakers finished with 2 wins and 3 losses against Division I teams. The wins coming against Kent State University and the University of Alabama-Huntsville and the losses coming from Kent State and two from the University of Alaska-Anchorage. The first time the team would be ranked 1st in their history was in December 1994. In the 1994–1995 season, the Lakers went 23-3-2 coming out with their first ever ECAC-West division championship and placing second in the NCAA Division II play-offs.

In September 1997, while the Meryhurst Lakers were playing in the ECAC-West division, the Metro Atlantic Athletic Conference (MAAC) rounded up 8 teams to form a Division I hockey conference. Joining the conferences of Eastern Collegiate Athletic Conference, Hockey East, Central Collegiate Hockey Association, and Western Collegiate Hockey Association in NCAA Division I men's ice hockey with 48 schools playing in 5 Division I conferences. The MAAC included Canisius College, Fairfield University, and Iona College (New York) (now a "University") as full members with American International College (AIC), University of Connecticut (UConn), the College of the Holy Cross, Quinnipiac College (also now a "University"), and Sacred Heart University as associate members with visions of Bentley University and Mercyhurst joining for the 1999–2000 season making the conference 10 teams.

=== Division I ===
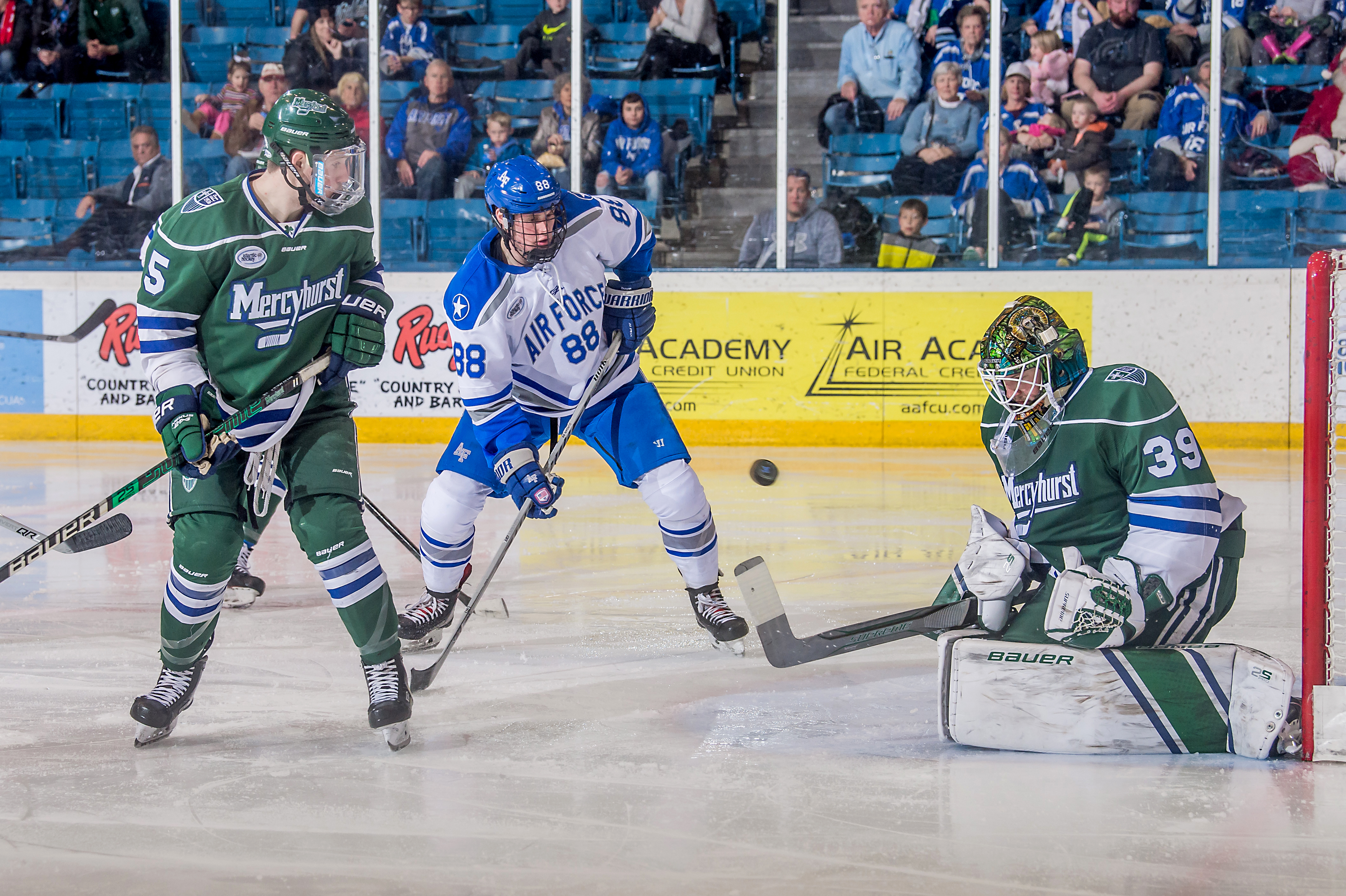
The Mercyhurst men's ice hockey team plays against Air Force in 2018

In May 1998, the Mercyhurst board of trustees approved the transition from Division II non-scholarship to play Division I ice hockey in the NCAA. The Lakers ended their long association with the Eastern College Athletic Conference West division to play Division I hockey in the Metro Atlantic Athletic Conference. In the Lakers first full season at the Division I level in the 1999–2000 season, Mercyhurst went 20-14-2 with Rick Gotkin still as head coach of the team. In 2003, the Metro Atlantic Athletic Conference reorganized to create the Atlantic Hockey Association with Quinnipiac, UConn, AIC, Canisius, Holy Cross, Sacred Heart, Bentley, Army, and Mercyhurst as the 9 members of the league.

Atlantic Hockey America includes all 11 teams that played in the Atlantic Hockey Association's final season: Mercyhurst, AIC, Air Force, Army, Bentley, Canisius, Holy Cross, Niagara, RIT (in full Rochester Institute of Technology), Robert Morris, and Sacred Heart.

On March 27, 2026, Mercyhurst University announced the discontinuation of the men's hockey program at the end of the 2025-26 season.

== Season-by-season results ==
Source:

== All-time coaching records ==
As of the completion of 2025–26 season

| Tenure | Coach | Years | Record | Pct. |
|---|---|---|---|---|
| 1987–1988 | Fred Lane | 1 | 16–7–0 | .696 |
| 1988–2026 | Rick Gotkin | 38 | 617–578–114 | .515 |
| Totals | 2 coaches | 39 seasons | 633–585–114 | .518 |

== Statistical leaders ==
=== Career points leaders ===
| Player | Years | GP | G | A | Pts | PIM |
|---|---|---|---|---|---|---|
| Scott Burfoot | 1988–1992 | 113 | 141 | 149 | 290 | 197 |
| Kevin McKinnon | 1992–1996 | 91 | 119 | 79 | 198 | 226 |
| Troy Winch | 1989–1992 | 93 | 80 | 106 | 186 | 128 |
| Craig MacDonald | 1991–1995 | 111 | 70 | 107 | 177 | 122 |
| Mick Keen | 1988–1992 | 119 | 80 | 82 | 162 | 95 |
| Louis Goulet | 1998–2002 | 137 | 61 | 96 | 157 | 88 |
| Ben Cottreau | 2004–2008 | 132 | 61 | 95 | 156 | 230 |
| John Evangelista | 1994–1998 | 103 | 57 | 97 | 154 | 111 |
| Bryce Bohun | 1992–1996 | 98 | 49 | 101 | 150 | 28 |
| Bob Atkin | 1995–1999 | 105 | 66 | 81 | 147 | 52 |

Statistics current through the start of the 2022–23 season.

== Awards and honors ==
=== NCAA ===
==== All-Americans ====
NCAA Division III / II

- 1990-91: Scott Burfoot F
- 1992-93: Andrew Moir D
- 1994-95: Justin Proud D
- 1995-96: Kevin McKinnon F
- 1996-97: John Evangelista F
- 1997-98: John Evangelista F

AHCA Second Team All-Americans

- 2018–19: Joseph Duszak, D

=== ECAC West ===
==== Individual awards ====
Player of the Year

- Scott Burfoot: 1991, 1992
- Scott Barber: 1993
- Kevin McKinnon: 1996

Rookie of the Year

- Craig MacDonald: 1992
- Kevin McKinnon: 1993

==== All-Conference teams ====
First Team All-ECAC

- 1990–91: Scott Burfoot, F
- 1992–93: Andrew Moir, D
- 1995–96: Kevin McKinnon, F

Second Team All-ECAC

- 1992–93: Rob Madia, F
- 1994–95: Justin Proud, D
- 1996–97: John Evangelista, F
- 1997–98: John Evangelista, F

=== MAAC ===
==== Individual awards ====
Defensive Player of the Year

- Paul Colontino, D: 2000

Goaltender of the Year

- Peter Aubry: 2001, 2002

Offensive Rookie of the Year

- Adam Tackaberry, C: 2001
- Scott Reynolds, F: 2003

Coach of the Year

- Rick Gotkin: 2001

Tournament Most Valuable Player

- Jeff Gould: 2001
- David Wrigley: 2003

==== All-Conference teams ====
First Team All-MAAC

- 1999–00: Paul Colotino, D
- 2000–01: Peter Aubry, G; Eric Ellis, F
- 2001–02: Peter Aubry, G; Louis Goulet, F

Second Team All-MAAC

- 1999–00: Eric Ellis, F; Louis Goulet, F
- 2000–01: Jody Robinson, D; Louis Goulet, F; Tom McMonagle, F
- 2001–02: Adam Tackaberry, F
- 2002–03: T. J. Kemp, D; Rich Hansen, F

MAAC All-Rookie Team

- 2000–01: Adam Tackaberry, F
- 2001–02: T. J. Kemp, D; Rich Hansen, F
- 2002–03: Conrad Martin, D; Scott Reynolds, F

=== Atlantic Hockey Association ===
==== Individual awards ====
Player of the Year

- Jimmy Sarjeant, G: 2014
- Joseph Duszak, D: 2019

Rookie of the Year

- Ben Cottreau: 2005
- Taylor Holstrom: 2011
- Lester Lancaster: 2016

Best Defensive Forward

- Scott Reynolds, F: 2005
- Dan O'Donoghue, F: 2014
- Jack Riley, F: 2018
- Joshua Lammon, F: 2019

Best Defenseman

- T. J. Kemp: 2004
- Conrad Martin: 2005
- Nick Jones: 2014
- Lester Lancaster: 2017
- Joseph Duszak: 2019

Individual Sportsmanship Award

- Chris Risi, F: 2010
- Nick Jones: 2014
- Bryan Sienerth: 2018

Regular Season Goaltending Award

- Jimmy Sarjeant: 2014

Regular Season Scoring Trophy

- Ben Cottreau: 2006
- Matthew Zay: 2013
- Eric Esposito: 2023

Coach of the Year

- Rick Gotkin: 2014, 2018

Most Valuable Player in Tournament

- Scott Champagne: 2005

==== All-Conference teams ====
First Team All-Atlantic Hockey

- 2003–04: T. J. Kemp, D
- 2004–05: T. J. Kemp, D
- 2005–06: Jamie Hunt, D; Dave Borrelli, F
- 2012–13: Nick Jones, F
- 2013–14: Jimmy Sarjeant, G; Nick Jones, D; Matthew Zay, F
- 2015–16: Lester Lancaster, D
- 2016–17: Lester Lancaster, D
- 2018–19: Joseph Duszak, D; Derek Barach, F

Second Team All-Atlantic Hockey

- 2003–04: Mike Carter, F; David Wrigley, F
- 2004–05: Conrad Martin, D; David Wrigley, F
- 2005–06: Ben Cottreau, F
- 2007–08: Ben Cottreau, F
- 2008–09: Ryan Zapolski, G; Steve Cameron, F; Matt Pierce, F
- 2009–10: Brandon Coccimigilo, F
- 2010–11: Ryan Zapolski, G
- 2012–13: Ryan Misiak, F
- 2013–14: Dan O'Donoghue, F
- 2014–15: Ryan Misiak, F
- 2016–17: Derek Barach, F
- 2017–18: Brandon Wildung, G; Joseph Duszak, D; Jack Riley, F; Derek Barach, F
- 2020–21: Joseph Maziarz, D; Jon Bendorf, F; Carson Brière, F
- 2022–23: Eric Esposito, F

Third Team All-Atlantic Hockey

- 2008–09: Scott Pitt, F
- 2009–10: Ryan Zapolski, G
- 2010–11: Jeff Terminesi, D; Scott Pitt, F
- 2011–12: Nick Jones, D
- 2012–13: Matthew Zay, F
- 2014–15: Daniel Bahntge, F
- 2015–16: Derek Barach, F
- 2021–22: Carson Brière, F
- 2023–24: Owen Say, G

Atlantic Hockey All-Rookie Team

- 2003–04: Jamie Hunt, D
- 2004–05: Ben Cottreau, F
- 2005–06: Chris Trafford, F
- 2006–07: Cullen Eddy, D
- 2007–08: Jeff Terminesi, D
- 2008–09: Phil Ginand, F
- 2010–11: Taylor Holstrom, F
- 2011–12: Tyler Shiplo, D; Dan Bahntge, F
- 2014–15: Jack Riley, F
- 2015–16: Lester Lancaster, D; Derek Barach, F
- 2018–19: Josh McDougall, D
- 2020–21: Austin Heidemann, F; Carson Brière, F
- 2022–23: Owen Say, G
- 2023–24: Trent Sambrook, D; Boris Skalos, F

== Mercyhurst Ice Center ==
Before the opening of the Mercyhurst Ice Center, the Mercyhurst Lakers played their games at the Erie Civic Center and Glenwood Ice Rink. Due to constantly being on the road, the Lakers team referred to themselves as “The Boys On The Bus”. Needing a rink on campus, Mercyhurst President, William Garvey, found a deal to fund the building for a rink on campus. On December 8, 1991, the Lakers began to play in the Mercyhurst Ice Center located on the Mercyhurst University campus. They opened the new rink against the Rochester Institute of Technology that they lost 5–4.

== Notable alumni ==
Jamie Hunt, Mercyhurst 2003–2006. Nick Jones, Mercyhurst 2010–2014. T.J. Kemp, Mercyhurst 2001–2005. Ryan Zapolski, Mercyhurst 2007–2011.

== Final roster ==
As of September 3, 2025.

| No. | Nat. | Player | Class | Pos | Height | Weight | DoB | Hometown | Previous team | NHL rights |
|---|---|---|---|---|---|---|---|---|---|---|
| 1 | (United States) | Michael Chambre | Sophomore | G | 6' 1" (1.85 m) | 170 lb (77 kg) | 2005-01-07 | Fort Myers, Florida | Sioux Falls Stampede (USHL) | — |
| 2 | (United States) | Lukas Klemm | Freshman | D | 6' 2" (1.88 m) | 194 lb (88 kg) | 2004-04-20 | Ridgefield, Connecticut | Johnstown Tomahawks (NAHL) | — |
| 3 | (United States) | John Larkin | Senior | D | 6' 2" (1.88 m) | 190 lb (86 kg) | 2001-01-26 | Northville, Michigan | Ohio State (Big Ten) | — |
| 4 | (Canada) | Jaryd Sych | Junior | D | 6' 2" (1.88 m) | 194 lb (88 kg) | 2003-02-10 | Airdrie, Alberta | Notre Dame Hounds (SJHL) | — |
| 5 | (United States) | Caleb Price | Graduate | D | 5' 10" (1.78 m) | 170 lb (77 kg) | 2000-03-31 | Hooksett, New Hampshire | Lindenwood (NCAA) | — |
| 6 | (United States) | Trent Sambrook | Junior | D | 5' 9" (1.75 m) | 165 lb (75 kg) | 2002-01-03 | Winnipeg, Manitoba | Winkler Flyers (MJHL) | — |
| 7 | (United States) | Tyler DesRochers | Junior | D | 6' 0" (1.83 m) | 185 lb (84 kg) | 2003-04-02 | Howell, New Jersey | Johnstown Tomahawks (NAHL) | — |
| 8 | (United States) | Brendan Lamb | Sophomore | F | 5' 11" (1.8 m) | 176 lb (80 kg) | 2004-05-14 | Battle Creek, Michigan | Madison Capitols (USHL) | — |
| 9 | (Canada) | Sean James | Junior | F | 6' 0" (1.83 m) | 161 lb (73 kg) | 2002-09-10 | Almonte, Ontario | Smiths Falls Bears (CCHL) | — |
| 10 | (United States) | Franky Iasenza | Freshman | D | 6' 1" (1.85 m) | 201 lb (91 kg) | 2004-07-11 | Pointe-Claire, Quebec | Victoriaville Tigres (QMJHL) | — |
| 11 | (United States) | Barrett Brooks | Senior | F | 5' 8" (1.73 m) | 170 lb (77 kg) | 2001-12-19 | Stevens Point, Wisconsin | Western Michigan (NCHC) | — |
| 14 | (Canada) | Andrew LeBlanc | Freshman | F | 6' 0" (1.83 m) | 183 lb (83 kg) | 2004-06-03 | George Town, Cayman Islands | North Bay Battalion (OHL) | — |
| 15 | (Czech Republic) | Dominik Bartecko | Sophomore | F | 5' 9" (1.75 m) | 170 lb (77 kg) | 2003-12-09 | Prague, Czech Republic | New Jersey Titans (NAHL) | — |
| 16 | (United States) | Ryan Coughlin | Senior | F | 6' 0" (1.83 m) | 180 lb (82 kg) | 2001-02-09 | Charlotte, North Carolina | New Jersey Titans (NAHL) | — |
| 18 | (Canada) | Jacob LeBlanc | Freshman | F | 6' 1" (1.85 m) | 187 lb (85 kg) | 2004-06-03 | George Town, Cayman Islands | North Bay Battalion (OHL) | — |
| 19 | (United States) | Riley Fitzgerald | Sophomore | F | 5' 9" (1.75 m) | 161 lb (73 kg) | 2003-06-02 | Wilmington, Massachusetts | New Jersey Titans (NAHL) | — |
| 20 | (United States) | Kaden Muir | Sophomore | D | 6' 2" (1.88 m) | 190 lb (86 kg) | 2004-05-09 | Manchester, New Hampshire | Austin Bruins (NAHL) | — |
| 21 | (United States) | Will Schumacher | Freshman | F | 6' 0" (1.83 m) | 181 lb (82 kg) | 2004-05-04 | Prior Lake, Minnesota | Victoria Grizzlies (BCHL) | — |
| 22 | (Canada) | Noah Sedore | Junior | F | 5' 9" (1.75 m) | 168 lb (76 kg) | 2002-02-24 | Bobcaygeon, Ontario | Prince Edward Island (AUS) | — |
| 23 | (United States) | Christian Kocsis | Sophomore | F | 5' 10" (1.78 m) | 170 lb (77 kg) | 2004-06-09 | Middletown, New Jersey | Omaha Lancers (USHL) | — |
| 24 | (Canada) | Matteo Disipio | Sophomore | F | 5' 11" (1.8 m) | 161 lb (73 kg) | 2003-07-26 | Nepean, Ontario | Rochester Jr. Americans (NAHL) | — |
| 26 | (Canada) | Spencer Smith | Junior | F | 5' 8" (1.73 m) | 174 lb (79 kg) | 2002-05-20 | St. Catharines, Ontario | Penticton Vees (BCHL) | — |
| 27 | (Canada) | Alex Dimitriadis | Freshman | F | 5' 10" (1.78 m) | 181 lb (82 kg) | 2004-08-06 | Richmond Hill, Ontario | Sherwood Park Crusaders (BCHL) | — |
| 28 | (United States) | Tyler Nasca | Senior | D | 5' 11" (1.8 m) | 160 lb (73 kg) | 2001-01-09 | Buffalo, New York | Lone Star Brahmas (NAHL) | — |
| 29 | (Canada) | Charles-Edward Gravel | Freshman | G | 6' 1" (1.85 m) | 194 lb (88 kg) | 2004-05-23 | Lévis, Quebec | Prince George Spruce Kings (BCHL) | — |
| 33 | (United States) | Sal Evola | Senior | G | 6' 0" (1.83 m) | 175 lb (79 kg) | 2001-04-24 | Rochester, Michigan | Bowling Green (CCHA) | — |
| 34 | (Canada) | Joey Serpa | Junior | F | 6' 0" (1.83 m) | 165 lb (75 kg) | 2002-03-23 | Cambridge, Ontario | Dalhousie (AUS) | — |
| 37 | (United States) | Connor Pelc | Junior | F | 6' 2" (1.88 m) | 194 lb (88 kg) | 2003-04-28 | Buffalo, New York | Sioux Falls Stampede (USHL) | — |
| 43 | (United States) | Tyler Haskins | Senior | F | 6' 1" (1.85 m) | 170 lb (77 kg) | 2003-07-07 | Rochester, Minnesota | Minnesota State (CCHA) | — |
| 44 | (Canada) | Simon Bucheler | Sophomore | G | 6' 2" (1.88 m) | 188 lb (85 kg) | 2002-03-29 | Saint-Laurent, Quebec | Shreveport Mudbugs (NAHL) | — |

== Olympians ==
This is a list of Mercyhurst alumni were a part of an Olympic team.

| Name | Position | Mercyhurst Tenure | Team | Year | Finish |
|---|---|---|---|---|---|
| Ryan Zapolski | Goaltender | 2007–2011 | (United States) USA | 2018 | 7th |

== Lakers in the NHL ==
As of July 1, 2025.

| Player | Position | Team(s) | Years | Games | Stanley Cups |
|---|---|---|---|---|---|
| Jamie Hunt | Defenseman | WSH | 2006–2007 | 1 | 0 |

== See also ==
- Mercyhurst Lakers women's ice hockey
