= Mercyhurst Ice Center =

Hockey rink in Erie, Pennsylvania

Coordinates: 42.1027°N 80.0551°W

- The MIC
- Interactive map of Mercyhurst Ice Center
- Location: Erie, Pennsylvania, United States 16546
- Owner: Mercyhurst University
- Operator: Mercyhurst University
- Capacity: 1,500 (hockey)
- Surface: 200' x 85' (ice arena)

Construction
- Opened: December 8, 1991; 34 years ago
- Cost: $1.4 million

Tenants
- Mercyhurst Lakers (Men's and Women's Ice Hockey)

Mercyhurst Ice Center is a 35,280 square foot, 1,500-seat hockey rink in Erie, Pennsylvania, United States. It is home to the Mercyhurst University Lakers Women's ice hockey team, also hosting the men's team there through the end of the 2025-26 college hockey season. The center was the first privately funded ice rink in Erie when it opened on December 8, 1991.

== Lakers Men's Team ==
The Lakers men's ice hockey team competed in Division I Atlantic Hockey until being disbanded after the 2025-26 college season. Prior to 1991, the Lakers were known as The Boys on the Bus because they had to shuttle by bus to local civic rinks for events. Their determination and competitiveness encouraged the school to build the new center. The arena was the site of the 1995 NCAA Men's Division II Ice Hockey Championship.

== Laker's Women's Team ==
Lakers women's ice hockey has been played at the center since the team formed in 1999. The women, who play in the College Hockey America league, reached the 2007 NCAA Frozen Four as #2 seed. Their overtime loss to Duluth in quarterfinal play at the Ice Center on 9 March 2007 left the Lakers with a 32-2-3 season record.

== General Uses ==
The Ice Center hosts local youth and high school hockey programs, as well as recreational skating for Mercyhurst students.

== See also ==
- Mercyhurst University
