= List of Air Force Falcons men's ice hockey seasons =

This is a season-by-season list of records compiled by the Air Force Academy in men's ice hockey.

The Air Force has made seven appearances in the NCAA Tournament, all as a consequence of winning the Atlantic Hockey tournament. The Falcons have won three games, twice defeating the #1 team in the nation.

== Season-by-season results ==
Note: GP = Games played, W = Wins, L = Losses, T = Ties

NCAA D-I Champions	NCAA Frozen Four	Conference regular season champions	Conference Playoff Champions

Season	Conference	Regular season (Note: Code explanation; GP—Games Played, W—Wins, L—Losses, T—Tied games, OTW—Overtime Wins, OTL—Overtime Loses, 3/SW—Win in 3 on 3 overtime or shootout, Pts—Points*)														Conference Tournament Results	National Tournament Results
Season	Conference	Conference									Overall					Conference Tournament Results	National Tournament Results
Season	Conference	GP	W	L	T	OTW	OTL	3/SW	Pts*	Finish	GP	W	L	T	%	Conference Tournament Results	National Tournament Results
University Division
Vic Heyliger (1968 — 1974)
1968–69	Independent	—	—	—	—	—	—	—	—	—	18	6	12	0	.333		
1969–70	Independent	—	—	—	—	—	—	—	—	—	29	11	17	1	.397		
1970–71	Independent	—	—	—	—	—	—	—	—	—	28	15	11	2	.571		
1971–72	Independent	—	—	—	—	—	—	—	—	—	31	25	6	0	.806		
1972–73	Independent	—	—	—	—	—	—	—	—	—	32	16	16	0	.500		
Division I
1973–74	Independent	—	—	—	—	—	—	—	—	—	27	12	15	0	.444		
John Matchefts (1974 — 1985)
1974–75	Independent	—	—	—	—	—	—	—	—	—	30	24	5	1	.817		
1975–76	Independent	—	—	—	—	—	—	—	—	—	26	16	10	0	.615		
1976–77	Independent	—	—	—	—	—	—	—	—	—	27	20	7	0	.741		
1977–78	Independent	—	—	—	—	—	—	—	—	—	26	9	17	0	.346		
1978–79	Independent	—	—	—	—	—	—	—	—	—	31	18	12	1	.597		
1979–80	Independent	—	—	—	—	—	—	—	—	—	31	15	16	0	.484		
1980–81	Independent	—	—	—	—	—	—	—	—	—	26	13	13	0	.500		
1981–82	Independent	—	—	—	—	—	—	—	—	—	30	12	17	1	.417		
1982–83	Independent	—	—	—	—	—	—	—	—	—	28	5	23	0	.179		
1983–84	Independent	—	—	—	—	—	—	—	—	—	26	8	16	2	.346		
1984–85	Independent	—	—	—	—	—	—	—	—	—	29	14	14	1	.500		
Chuck Delich (1985 — 1997)
1985–86	Independent	—	—	—	—	—	—	—	—	—	28	15	13	0	.536		
1986–87	Independent	—	—	—	—	—	—	—	—	—	29	19	10	0	.655		
1987–88	Independent	—	—	—	—	—	—	—	—	—	29	15	14	0	.517		
1988–89	Independent	—	—	—	—	—	—	—	—	—	29	14	12	3	.534		
1989–90	Independent	—	—	—	—	—	—	—	—	—	30	16	13	1	.550		
1990–91	Independent	—	—	—	—	—	—	—	—	—	32	11	17	4	.406		
1991–92	Independent	—	—	—	—	—	—	—	—	—	34	14	20	0	.412		
1992–93	Independent	—	—	—	—	—	—	—	—	—	30	8	20	2	.300		
1993–94	Independent	—	—	—	—	—	—	—	—	—	32	15	16	1	.484		
1994–95	Independent	—	—	—	—	—	—	—	—	—	33	15	17	1	.470		
1995–96	Independent	—	—	—	—	—	—	—	—	—	33	4	24	5	.197		
1996–97	Independent	—	—	—	—	—	—	—	—	—	31	8	21	2	.290		
Frank Serratore (1997 — Present)
1997–98	Independent	—	—	—	—	—	—	—	—	—	34	15	19	0	.441		
1998–99	Independent	—	—	—	—	—	—	—	—	—	36	15	19	2	.444		
1999–00	CHA	16	6	10	0	—	—	—	12	4th	39	19	18	2	.513	Won Quarterfinal, 4–1 (Findlay); Lost Semifinal, 1–9 (Niagara)	
2000–01	CHA	19	6	9	4	—	—	—	18	T–4th	37	16	17	4	.486	Won Quarterfinal, 2–1 (Findlay); Lost Semifinal, 0–7 (Alabama–Huntsville)	
2001–02	CHA	18	6	10	2	—	—	—	14	5th	34	16	16	2	.500	Won Quarterfinal, 5–3 (Niagara); Lost Semifinal, 1–3 (Wayne State)	
2002–03	CHA	20	2	15	3	—	—	—	7	6th	37	10	24	3	.311	Lost Quarterfinal, 2–4 (Wayne State)	
2003–04	CHA	20	6	13	1	—	—	—	13	5th	37	14	21	2	.405	Lost Quarterfinal, 1–9 (Findlay)	
2004–05	CHA	20	5	14	1	—	—	—	11	5th	36	14	19	3	.431	Won Quarterfinal, 4–3 (OT) (Wayne State); Lost Semifinal, 0–6 (Bemidji State)	
2005–06	CHA	20	8	12	0	—	—	—	16	T–4th	32	11	20	1	.359	Lost Quarterfinal, 3–4 (Robert Morris)	
2006–07	Atlantic Hockey	28	13	10	5	—	—	—	31	5th	40	19	16	5	.538	Won Quarterfinal, 3–0 (Holy Cross); Won Semifinal, 5–4 (OT) (Sacred Heart); Won Championship, 6–1 (Army)	Lost Regional semifinal, 3–4 (Minnesota)
2007–08	Atlantic Hockey	28	14	9	5	—	—	—	33	3rd	39	21	12	6	.615	Won Quarterfinal series, 2–0 (Bentley); Won Semifinal, 5–0 (RIT); Won Championship, 5–4 (2OT) (Mercyhurst)	Lost Regional semifinal, 2–3 (OT) (Miami)
2008–09	Atlantic Hockey	28	20	6	2	—	—	—	42	T–1st	41	28	11	2	.707	Won Quarterfinal series, 2–1 (Sacred Heart); Won Semifinal, 3–0 (Bentley); Won Championship, 2–0 (Mercyhurst)	Won Regional semifinal, 2–0 (Michigan); Lost Regional final, 2–3 (2OT) (Vermont)
2009–10	Atlantic Hockey	28	14	8	6	—	—	—	34	3rd	37	16	15	6	.514	Won Quarterfinal series, 2–0 (Army); Lost Semifinal, 1–2 (Sacred Heart)	
2010–11	Atlantic Hockey	27	14	7	6	—	—	—	34	2nd	38	20	12	6	.605	Won Quarterfinal series, 2–0 (Sacred Heart); Won Semifinal, 3–2 (Holy Cross); Won Championship, 1–0 (RIT)	Lost Regional semifinal, 1–2 (OT) (Yale)
2011–12	Atlantic Hockey	27	15	6	6	—	—	—	36	1st	39	21	11	7	.628	Won Quarterfinal series, 2–1 (Connecticut); Won Semifinal, 5–2 (Mercyhurst); Won Championship, 4–0 (RIT)	Lost Regional semifinal, 0–2 (Boston College)
2012–13	Atlantic Hockey	27	15	7	5	—	—	—	35	2nd	37	17	13	7	.554	Lost Quarterfinal series, 0–2 (Canisius)	
2013–14	Atlantic Hockey	27	15	9	3	—	—	—	33	T–3rd	39	21	14	4	.590	Lost First round series, 1–2 (Niagara)	
2014–15	Atlantic Hockey	28	13	12	3	—	—	—	29	T-6th	41	16	21	4	.439	Won First round series, 2–0 (American International); Lost Quarterfinal series, 0–2 (RIT)	
2015–16	Atlantic Hockey	28	16	7	5	—	—	—	37	T–2nd	37	20	12	5	.608	Won Quarterfinal series, 2–0 (Canisius); Lost Semifinal, 1–2 (OT) (RIT)	
2016–17	Atlantic Hockey	28	19	6	3	—	—	—	41	2nd	42	27	10	5	.702	Won Quarterfinal series, 2–0 (Bentley); Won Semifinal, 1–0 (Army); Won Championship, 2–1 (Robert Morris)	Won Regional semifinal, 5–4 (Western Michigan); Lost Regional final, 2–3 (Harvard)
2017–18	Atlantic Hockey	28	13	11	4	—	—	—	30	T–3rd	43	23	15	5	.593	Won Quarterfinal series, 2–1 (Army); Won Semifinal, 3–0 (Canisius); Won Championship, 5–1 (Robert Morris)	Won Regional semifinal, 5–4 (St. Cloud State); Lost Regional final, 1–2 (Minnesota–Duluth)
2018–19	Atlantic Hockey	28	14	10	4	—	—	—	32	3rd	36	16	15	5	.514	Lost Quarterfinal series, 1–2 (Niagara)	
2019–20	Atlantic Hockey	28	10	12	6	—	—	5	41	T–6th	36	12	18	6	.417	Won First round series, 2–0 (Mercyhurst); Tournament cancelled	
2020–21	Atlantic Hockey	13	3	9	1	2	1	0	.231	10th	14	3	10	1	.250	Lost First round, 3–7 (Bentley)	
2021–22	Atlantic Hockey	26	11	12	3	3	2	2	37	6th	36	16	17	3	.486	Won Quarterfinal series, 2–0 (Army); Won Semifinal, 4–3 (RIT); Lost Championship, 0–7 (American International)	
2022–23	Atlantic Hockey	26	8	17	1	1	0	0	24	10th	36	12	22	2	.361		
2023–24	Atlantic Hockey	26	15	10	1	3	0	1	44	4th	38	18	19	1	.487	Lost Quarterfinal series, 0–2 (American International)	
2024–25	AHA	26	11	13	2	2	3	1	37	7th	40	16	21	3	.438	Won First Round, 4–3 (2OT) (Robert Morris); Lost Quarterfinal series, 1–2 (Sacred Heart)	
2025–26	AHA	26	13	10	3	2	1	0	41	6th	37	18	15	4	.541	Lost Quarterfinal series, 1–2 (Robert Morris)	
Totals											GP	W	L	T	%	Championships	
Regular season											1818	833	861	134	.492	2 Atlantic Hockey Championships	
Conference Post-season											75	47	28	0	.627	7 Atlantic Hockey tournament championships	
NCAA Post-season											10	3	7	0	.300	7 NCAA Tournament Appearances	
Regular season and Post-season Record											1913	883	896	134	.497		

* Winning percentage is used when conference schedules are unbalanced.
