= List of Army Black Knights men's ice hockey seasons =

This is a season-by-season list of records compiled by Army West Point in men's ice hockey.

Army is one of the oldest programs in college hockey, having first fielded a team in 1903 and is second only to Yale in terms of consecutive seasons played. Despite their longevity, Army's ice hockey team has never made an appearance in a national tournament.

== Season-by-season results ==
Note: GP = Games played, W = Wins, L = Losses, T = Ties

NCAA D-I Champions	NCAA Frozen Four	Conference Regular Season Champions	Conference Division Champions	Conference Playoff Champions

Season	Conference	Regular Season (Note: Code explanation; GP—Games Played, W—Wins, L—Losses, T—Tied games, OTW—Overtime Wins, OTL—Overtime Loses, 3/SW—Win in 3 on 3 overtime or shootout, Pts—Points*)														Conference Tournament Results	National Tournament Results
Season	Conference	Conference									Overall					Conference Tournament Results	National Tournament Results
Season	Conference	GP	W	L	T	OTW	OTL	3/SW	Pts*	Finish	GP	W	L	T	%	Conference Tournament Results	National Tournament Results
Edward Leonard King (1903 — 1904)
1903–04	Independent	–	–	–	–	–	–	–	–	–	6	5	1	0	.833		
Robert Foy (1904 — 1907)
1904–05	Independent	–	–	–	–	–	–	–	–	–	8	7	1	0	.875		
1905–06	Independent	–	–	–	–	–	–	–	–	–	6	5	1	0	.833		
1906–07	Independent	–	–	–	–	–	–	–	–	–	9	3	6	0	.333		
George Russell (1907 — 1910)
1907–08	Independent	–	–	–	–	–	–	–	–	–	7	5	2	0	.714		
1908–09	Independent	–	–	–	–	–	–	–	–	–	2	0	1	1	.250		
1909–10	Independent	–	–	–	–	–	–	–	–	–	7	0	4	3	.214		
LeRoy Bartlett (1910 — 1912)
1910–11	Independent	–	–	–	–	–	–	–	–	–	4	1	3	0	.250		
1911–12	Independent	–	–	–	–	–	–	–	–	–	4	2	1	1	.625		
Philip Gordon (1912 — 1914)
1912–13	Independent	–	–	–	–	–	–	–	–	–	6	5	1	0	.833		
1913–14	Independent	–	–	–	–	–	–	–	–	–	7	2	5	0	.286		
Frank Purdon (1914 — 1917)
1914–15	Independent	–	–	–	–	–	–	–	–	–	5	1	4	0	.200		
1915–16	Independent	–	–	–	–	–	–	–	–	–	4	2	1	1	.625		
1916–17	Independent	–	–	–	–	–	–	–	–	–	11	6	5	0	.545		
Joseph Viner (1917 — 1918)
1917–18	Independent	–	–	–	–	–	–	–	–	–	9	6	3	0	.667		
Philip Day (1918 — 1920)
1918–19	Independent	–	–	–	–	–	–	–	–	–	4	2	2	0	.500		
1919–20	Independent	–	–	–	–	–	–	–	–	–	7	4	2	1	.643		
Talbot Hunter (1920 — 1923)
1920–21	Independent	–	–	–	–	–	–	–	–	–	3	0	2	1	.167		
1921–22	Independent	–	–	–	–	–	–	–	–	–	9	5	3	1	.611		
1922–23	Independent	–	–	–	–	–	–	–	–	–	14	7	7	0	.500		
Ray Marchand (1923 — 1943)
1923–24	Independent	–	–	–	–	–	–	–	–	–	8	3	5	0	.375		
1924–25	Independent	–	–	–	–	–	–	–	–	–	7	3	3	1	.500		
1925–26	Independent	–	–	–	–	–	–	–	–	–	9	3	6	0	.333		
1926–27	Independent	–	–	–	–	–	–	–	–	–	4	0	3	1	.125		
1927–28	Independent	–	–	–	–	–	–	–	–	–	9	1	8	0	.111		
1928–29	Independent	–	–	–	–	–	–	–	–	–	12	3	9	0	.250		
1929–30	Independent	–	–	–	–	–	–	–	–	–	11	6	3	2	.636		
1930–31	Independent	–	–	–	–	–	–	–	–	–	10	4	6	0	.400		
1931–32	Independent	–	–	–	–	–	–	–	–	–	9	5	4	0	.556		
1932–33	Independent	–	–	–	–	–	–	–	–	–	9	5	4	0	.556		
1933–34	Independent	–	–	–	–	–	–	–	–	–	10	4	6	0	.400		
1934–35	Independent	–	–	–	–	–	–	–	–	–	10	4	5	1	.450		
1935–36	Independent	–	–	–	–	–	–	–	–	–	9	5	4	0	.556		
1936–37	Independent	–	–	–	–	–	–	–	–	–	10	5	5	0	.500		
1937–38	Independent	–	–	–	–	–	–	–	–	–	10	5	4	1	.550		
1938–39	Independent	–	–	–	–	–	–	–	–	–	10	6	4	0	.600		
1939–40	Independent	–	–	–	–	–	–	–	–	–	10	6	2	2	.700		
1940–41	Independent	–	–	–	–	–	–	–	–	–	11	4	6	1	.409		
1941–42	Independent	–	–	–	–	–	–	–	–	–	12	1	11	0	.083		
1942–43	Independent	–	–	–	–	–	–	–	–	–	11	3	8	0	.273		
John Hines (1943 — 1944)
1943–44	Independent	–	–	–	–	–	–	–	–	–	9	5	4	0	.556		
Robert Lutz (1944 — 1945)
1944–45	Independent	–	–	–	–	–	–	–	–	–	10	7	2	1	.750		
Len Patten (1945 — 1950)
1945–46	Independent	–	–	–	–	–	–	–	–	–	13	7	6	0	.538		
1946–47	Pentagonal League	7	0	7	0	–	–	–	.000	5th	14	4	9	1	.321		
1947–48	Pentagonal League	4	2	2	0	–	–	–	.500	2nd	16	11	4	1	.719		
1948–49	Independent	–	–	–	–	–	–	–	–	–	15	8	7	0	.533		
1949–50	Independent	–	–	–	–	–	–	–	–	–	12	3	9	0	.250		
Jack Riley (1950 — 1986)
1950–51	Independent	–	–	–	–	–	–	–	–	–	13	2	10	1	.192		
1951–52	Independent	–	–	–	–	–	–	–	–	–	15	3	12	0	.200		
1952–53	Independent	–	–	–	–	–	–	–	–	–	16	8	8	0	.500		
1953–54	Independent	–	–	–	–	–	–	–	–	–	17	10	7	0	.588		
1954–55	Independent	–	–	–	–	–	–	–	–	–	16	8	8	0	.500		
1955–56	Independent	–	–	–	–	–	–	–	–	–	16	11	5	0	.688		
1956–57	Independent	–	–	–	–	–	–	–	–	–	18	14	4	0	.778		
1957–58	Independent	–	–	–	–	–	–	–	–	–	20	15	4	1	.775		
1958–59	Independent	–	–	–	–	–	–	–	–	–	20	9	10	1	.475		
1959–60	Independent	–	–	–	–	–	–	–	–	–	22	16	5	1	.750		
1960–61	Independent	–	–	–	–	–	–	–	–	–	25	17	8	0	.680		
1961–62	ECAC Hockey	19	14	4	1	–	–	–	.763	5th	24	17	6	1	.729	Lost Quarterfinal, 1–2 (OT) (Harvard)	
1962–63	ECAC Hockey	18	12	4	2	–	–	–	.722	6th	25	17	6	2	.720	Lost Quarterfinal, 1–3 (Boston College)	
1963–64	ECAC Hockey	21	17	4	0	–	–	–	.810	2nd	28	20	8	0	.714	Lost Quarterfinal, 2–3 (St. Lawrence)	
University Division
1964–65	ECAC Hockey	10	3	7	0	–	–	–	.300	12th	24	17	7	0	.708		
1965–66	ECAC Hockey	10	3	6	1	–	–	–	.350	11th	25	17	7	1	.700		
1966–67	ECAC Hockey	11	5	6	0	–	–	–	.455	10th	27	15	12	0	.556		
1967–68	ECAC Hockey	12	5	7	0	–	–	–	.417	12th	24	14	10	0	.583		
1968–69	ECAC Hockey	11	4	6	1	–	–	–	.409	10th	28	20	7	1	.732		
1969–70	ECAC Hockey	13	5	8	0	–	–	–	.385	11th	25	13	12	0	.520		
1970–71	ECAC Hockey	11	3	7	1	–	–	–	.318	11th	23	8	14	1	.370		
1971–72	ECAC Hockey	10	1	9	0	–	–	–	.100	17th	25	11	14	0	.440		
1972–73	ECAC Hockey	10	1	9	0	–	–	–	.100	17th	27	9	17	1	.352		
Division II
1973–74	ECAC 2	12	10	2	0	–	–	–	.833	–	28	20	7	1	.732	Lost Quarterfinal, 1–10 (Vermont)	
1974–75	ECAC 2	17	12	5	0	–	–	–	.706	–	29	18	11	0	.621	Lost Quarterfinal, 4–8 (Bowdoin)	
1975–76	ECAC 2	17	12	5	0	–	–	–	.706	–	28	18	9	1	.661	Won Quarterfinal, 3–2 (Union); Lost Semifinal, 2–8 (Merrimack)	
1976–77	ECAC 2	17	14	2	1	–	–	–	.853	–	29	22	6	1	.776	Won Quarterfinal, 7–6 (OT) (American International); Lost Semifinal, 4–11 (Union)	
1977–78	ECAC 2	19	10	8	1	–	–	–	.553	–	26	13	12	1	.519	Lost West Quarterfinal, 3–6 (Plattsburgh)	
1978–79	ECAC 2	22	6	16	0	–	–	–	.273	–	28	7	21	0	.250		
1979–80	ECAC 2	25	15	9	1	–	–	–	.620	–	32	19	12	1	.609	Lost West Quarterfinal, 6–12 (Oswego)	
Division I
1980–81	ECAC Hockey	–	–	–	–	–	–	–	–	–	35	21	13	1	.614		
1981–82	ECAC Hockey	–	–	–	–	–	–	–	–	–	36	25	11	0	.694		
1982–83	ECAC Hockey	–	–	–	–	–	–	–	–	–	37	25	11	1	.689		
1983–84	ECAC Hockey	–	–	–	–	–	–	–	–	–	34	28	5	1	.838		
1984–85	ECAC Hockey	11	0	11	0	–	–	–	0	12th	30	17	13	0	.567		
1985–86	ECAC Hockey	11	2	9	0	–	–	–	4	11th	30	18	11	1	.617		
Rob Riley (1986 — 2004)
1986–87	ECAC Hockey	22	6	16	0	–	–	–	12	11th	29	9	19	1	.328		
1987–88	ECAC Hockey	22	3	17	2	–	–	–	8	1st	30	9	19	2	.333		
1988–89	ECAC Hockey	22	6	15	1	–	–	–	13	10th	30	13	16	1	.450		
1989–90	ECAC Hockey	22	4	15	3	–	–	–	11	12th	30	10	16	4	.400		
1990–91	ECAC Hockey	22	3	17	2	–	–	–	8	11th	29	8	18	3	.328		
1991–92	Independent	–	–	–	–	–	–	–	–	–	31	13	17	1	.435		
1992–93	Independent	–	–	–	–	–	–	–	–	–	28	16	11	1	.589		
1993–94	Independent	–	–	–	–	–	–	–	–	–	30	14	16	0	.467		
1994–95	Independent	–	–	–	–	–	–	–	–	–	34	20	13	1	.603		
1995–96	Independent	–	–	–	–	–	–	–	–	–	34	24	9	1	.721		
1996–97	Independent	–	–	–	–	–	–	–	–	–	34	19	13	2	.588		
1997–98	Independent	–	–	–	–	–	–	–	–	–	34	18	15	1	.544		
1998–99	Independent	–	–	–	–	–	–	–	–	–	35	16	16	3	.500		
1999–00	CHA	10	1	9	0	–	–	–	2	6th	33	13	18	2	.424		
2000–01	MAAC	26	11	15	0	–	–	–	22	T–7th	35	12	19	4	.400	Lost Quarterfinal, 3–4 (OT) (Quinnipiac)	
2001–02	MAAC	26	9	11	6	–	–	–	24	8th	35	11	18	6	.400	Lost Quarterfinal, 1–2 (Mercyhurst)	
2002–03	MAAC	26	13	13	0	–	–	–	26	T–5th	34	18	16	0	.529	Lost Quarterfinal, 2–3 (Holy Cross)	
2003–04	Atlantic Hockey	24	6	15	3	–	–	–	15	8th	33	12	18	3	.409	Lost Play-In, 3–4 (American International)	
Brian Riley (2004 — 2025)
2004–05	Atlantic Hockey	24	5	16	3	–	–	–	13	8th	31	7	21	3	.274	Won Play-In, 5–3 (American International); Lost Quarterfinal, 0–2 (Quinnipiac)	
2005–06	Atlantic Hockey	28	10	12	6	–	–	–	26	5th	36	12	18	6	.417	Lost Quarterfinal, 3–4 (2OT) (Bentley)	
2006–07	Atlantic Hockey	28	15	8	5	–	–	–	35	3rd	34	17	12	5	.574	Won Quarterfinal, 6–2 (Bentley); Won Semifinal, 3–1 (Connecticut); Lost Championship, 1–6 (Air Force)	
2007–08	Atlantic Hockey	28	17	8	3	–	–	–	37	1st	37	19	14	4	.568	Won Quarterfinal series, 2–0 (American International); Lost Semifinal, 2–4 (Mercyhurst)	
2008–09	Atlantic Hockey	28	10	12	6	–	–	–	26	6th	36	11	19	6	.389	Lost Quarterfinal series, 0–2 (Mercyhurst)	
2009–10	Atlantic Hockey	28	10	12	6	–	–	–	26	6th	36	11	18	7	.403	Lost Quarterfinal series, 0–2 (Air Force)	
2010–11	Atlantic Hockey	27	10	13	4	–	–	–	24	9th	35	11	20	4	.371	Lost First round, 3–6 (American International)	
2011–12	Atlantic Hockey	27	3	19	5	–	–	–	11	T–11th	34	4	23	7	.221	Lost First Round series, 0–2 (Holy Cross)	
2012–13	Atlantic Hockey	27	7	15	5	–	–	–	19	11th	34	7	22	5	.279	Lost First Round series, 0–2 (Mercyhurst)	
2013–14	Atlantic Hockey	27	5	22	0	–	–	–	10	12th	34	6	28	0	.176	Lost First Round series, 1–2 (Robert Morris)	
2014–15	Atlantic Hockey	28	8	16	4	–	–	–	29	9th	34	8	22	4	.294	Lost First Round series, 0–2 (Sacred Heart)	
2015–16	Atlantic Hockey	28	8	11	9	–	–	–	25	T–6th	38	14	15	9	.487	Won First Round series, 2–1 (American International); Won Quarterfinal series, 2–0 (Holy Cross); Lost Semifinal, 1–2 (OT) (Robert Morris)	
2016–17	Atlantic Hockey	28	15	10	3	–	–	–	33	T–3rd	37	18	14	5	.554	Won Quarterfinal series, 2–1 (Mercyhurst); Lost Semifinal, 0–1 (Air Force)	
2017–18	Atlantic Hockey	28	12	10	6	–	–	–	30	T–3rd	36	15	15	6	.500	Lost Quarterfinal series, 1–2 (Air Force)	
2018–19	Atlantic Hockey	28	8	13	7	–	–	–	23	10th	39	12	20	7	.397	Won First Round series, 2–1 (Mercyhurst); Lost Quarterfinal series, 1–2 (American International)	
2019–20	Atlantic Hockey	28	14	11	3	3	–	–	48	4th	33	17	13	3	.561	Tournament Cancelled	
2020–21	Atlantic Hockey	15	10	4	1	3	1	1	.667	2nd	22	15	6	1	.705	Won East Quarterfinal series, 2–0 (Sacred Heart); Lost Semifinal, 3–4 (OT) (Canisius)	
2021–22	Atlantic Hockey	26	12	11	3	0	1	2	42	3rd	35	14	17	4	.457	Lost Quarterfinal series, 0–2 (Air Force)	
2022–23	Atlantic Hockey	26	12	12	2	3	3	1	39	5th	37	14	19	4	.432	Lost Quarterfinal series, 1–2 (Canisius)	
2023–24	Atlantic Hockey	26	8	16	2	0	1	1	28	10th	35	10	23	2	.314	Lost First Round, 1–4 (Niagara)	
2024–25	AHA	26	14	10	2	2	0	2	44	5th	38	16	20	2	.447	Won Quarterfinal series, 2–1 (Niagara); Lost Semifinal series, 0–2 (Holy Cross)	
Zach McKelvie (2025 — Present)
2025–26	AHA	26	7	15	4	2	3	2	28	9th	35	12	17	6	.429	Lost First Round, 4–5 (Niagara)	
Totals											GP	W	L	T	%	Championships	
Regular Season											2589	1235	1180	174	.511	1 Atlantic Hockey Championship	
Conference Post-season											66	20	46	0	.303		
NCAA Post-season											0	0	0	0	–		
Regular Season and Post-season Record											2651	1258	1229	174	.505		

* Winning percentage is used when conference schedules are unbalanced.
