= Delich =

Delich is a surname. Notable people with the surname include:

- Chuck Delich (born 1955), American ice hockey player and coach
- Helen Bentley (née Delich, 1923–2016), American politician
