= 2024–25 Air Force Falcons men's ice hockey season =

- Conference: 7th AHA
- Home ice: Cadet Ice Arena

Rankings
- USCHO: NR
- USA Hockey: NR

Record
- Overall: 16–21–3
- Conference: 11–13–2
- Home: 10–9–1
- Road: 6–10–2
- Neutral: 0–2–0

Coaches and captains
- Head coach: Frank Serratore
- Assistant coaches: Andy Berg; Joe Doyle; Steve Jennings; Josh Holmstrom
- Captain(s): Clayton Cosentino; Austin Schwartz
- Alternate captain(s): Mason McCormick; Holt Oliphant

The 2024–25 Air Force Falcons men's ice hockey season was the 57th season of play for the program and the 1st in Atlantic Hockey America. The Falcons represented the United States Air Force Academy, played their home games at the Cadet Ice Arena and were coached by Frank Serratore in his 28th season.

== Season ==
From the beginning of the season, Air Force struggled with a weak offense; averaging just over 2 goals per game, the Falcons give themselves little margin for error defensively. Fortunately for the team, they were able to rely on stable goaltending from Guy Blessing and capable shot-blocking from both Chris Hedden and Will Staring. The result for the team was a great many close, low-scoring games.

For the first half of the season, Air Force was a bit streaky, alternating stretches of wins and losses. By the time the team paused for the winter break, the Falcons were sitting just below .500 but had played well in conference play. After two splits to open the second half against two of the AHA luminaries, the team hit a rough patch. An uncharacteristically poor stretch of games from Blessing saw the team lose six consecutive and sag into the middle of the standings. While the team recovered in early February, the would be forced to begin their postseason run in the First Round of the conference tournament.

In their final home game of the season, Air Force faced a rebuilding Robert Morris club that gave them a tougher challenge than their record would have indicated. The Colonials were able to get three goals on the Falcons and it took just about everything the home team had to remain in the contest. Air Force fired 43 shots on goal in regulation and managed to equal the total from RMU. After such a harrying ordeal, the Falcons appeared to relax a bit in overtime, getting only 5 shots over a 20-minute span. Fortunately, the defense was up to the task and a fifth period was required. The Falcons began to pressure the visitors cage and eventually forced them to take a slashing penalty. Mere seconds after the ensuing faceoff, Anthony Yu jammed the puck in from just outside the paint and sent the team to the quarterfinals.

In the series with Sacred Heart, the lack of finish caught up with the Falcons as the team was unable to content with the Pioneers' offense. Air Force still fought hard, winning another double-overtime game on the strength of Austin Schwartz' team-leading 12th of the season. However, their valiant effort was not enough for the Falcons to take the series and after a succeeding loss the team's season came to a close.

== Departures ==
| Player | Position | Nationality | Cause |
|---|---|---|---|
| Brian Adams | Forward | United States | Graduation (retired) |
| Maiszon Balboa | Goaltender | United States | Graduation (retired) |
| Owen Baumgartner | Defenseman | United States | Transferred to Augustana |
| Sam Brennan | Defenseman | United States | Graduation (retired) |
| Parker Brown | Forward | United States | Graduation (retired) |
| Will Gavin | Forward | United States | Graduation (signed with Tucson Roadrunners) |
| Nathan Horn | Forward | United States | Graduation (retired) |
| Jacob Marti | Forward | United States | Graduation (retired) |
| Luke Robinson | Defenseman | United States | Graduation (retired) |
| Luke Rowe | Defenseman | United States | Graduation (signed with Ontario Reign) |

== Recruiting ==
| Player | Position | Nationality | Age | Notes |
|---|---|---|---|---|
| Cooper Boulanger | Forward | United States | 21 | Barre, VT |
| Joseph Cesario | Forward | United States | 21 | Westminster, CO |
| Will Dawson | Forward | United States | 20 | Traverse City, MI |
| Toby Hopp | Goaltender | United States | 20 | Maple Grove, MN |
| Beau Janzig | Defenseman | United States | 20 | Hermantown, MN |
| Will Jones | Defenseman | United States | 20 | Brentwood, TN |
| Michael Kadlecik | Forward | United States | 20 | Lansing, NY |
| Ren Morque | Defenseman | United States | 20 | Grand Rapids, MN |
| Jake Peterson | Defenseman | United States | 20 | Rosemount, MN |
| Nick Sajevic | Forward | United States | 21 | Shoreview, MN |
| Samuel Stitz | Forward | United States | 21 | Perry Hall, MD |
| Anthony Yu | Forward | United States | 20 | Baldwin Park, CA |

== Roster ==
As of August 13, 2024.

| No. | Nat. | Player | Class | Pos | Height | Weight | DoB | Hometown | Previous team | NHL rights |
|---|---|---|---|---|---|---|---|---|---|---|
| 1 | (United States) | Guy Blessing | Senior | G | 6' 3" (1.91 m) | 180 lb (82 kg) | 2001-05-08 | Chandler, Arizona | Lone Star Brahmas (NAHL) | — |
| 2 | (United States) | Beau Janzig | Freshman | D | 6' 2" (1.88 m) | 201 lb (91 kg) | 2003-11-17 | Hermantown, Minnesota | Minnesota Wilderness (NAHL) | — |
| 3 | (United States) | Rem Morque | Freshman | D | 6' 1" (1.85 m) | 190 lb (86 kg) | 2003-11-12 | Grand Rapids, Minnesota | Minnesota Wilderness (NAHL) | — |
| 4 | (United States) | Will Jones | Freshman | D | 5' 9" (1.75 m) | 170 lb (77 kg) | 2004-03-09 | Brentwood, Tennessee | Powell River Kings (BCHL) | — |
| 6 | (United States) | Anthony Yu | Freshman | F | 5' 9" (1.75 m) | 181 lb (82 kg) | 2004-07-10 | Baldwin Park, California | Powell River Kings (BCHL) | — |
| 7 | (United States) | Jake Peterson | Freshman | D | 6' 2" (1.88 m) | 190 lb (86 kg) | 2003-10-02 | Rosemount, Minnesota | Bismarck Bobcats (NAHL) | — |
| 8 | (United States) | Ethan Ulrick | Sophomore | F | 5' 11" (1.8 m) | 175 lb (79 kg) | 2003-04-25 | Lakewood, Illinois | Salmon Arm Silverbacks (BCHL) | — |
| 9 | (United States) | Lucas Coon | Senior | F | 6' 0" (1.83 m) | 185 lb (84 kg) | 2001-11-24 | Steamboat Springs, Colorado | Odessa Jackalopes (NAHL) | — |
| 10 | (United States) | Austin Schwartz (C) | Senior | F | 5' 9" (1.75 m) | 175 lb (79 kg) | 2001-06-18 | Parker, Colorado | Bismarck Bobcats (NAHL) | — |
| 11 | (United States) | Sam Jacobs | Sophomore | F | 6' 0" (1.83 m) | 185 lb (84 kg) | 2003-04-25 | Plymouth, Minnesota | Wisconsin Windigo (NAHL) | — |
| 12 | (United States) | James Callahan | Sophomore | D | 6' 0" (1.83 m) | 175 lb (79 kg) | 2002-12-18 | Minneapolis, Minnesota | Springfield Jr. Blues (NAHL) | — |
| 13 | (United States) | Mason McCormick (A) | Junior | F | 6' 4" (1.93 m) | 205 lb (93 kg) | 2001-05-25 | Verona, Wisconsin | Waterloo Black Hawks (USHL) | — |
| 14 | (United States) | Will Dawson | Freshman | F | 6' 0" (1.83 m) | 183 lb (83 kg) | 2003-10-03 | Traverse City, Michigan | Minot Minotauros (NAHL) | — |
| 15 | (United States) | Owen Dubois | Sophomore | F | 6' 4" (1.93 m) | 200 lb (91 kg) | 2002-07-06 | Madison, Wisconsin | Aberdeen Wings (NAHL) | — |
| 16 | (United States) | Cooper Boulanger | Freshman | F | 5' 11" (1.8 m) | 181 lb (82 kg) | 2003-07-08 | Barre, Vermont | Oklahoma Warriors (NAHL) | — |
| 17 | (United States) | Michael Kadlecik | Freshman | F | 6' 0" (1.83 m) | 170 lb (77 kg) | 2004-04-14 | Lansing, New York | Odessa Jackalopes (NAHL) | — |
| 18 | (United States) | Holt Oliphant (A) | Junior | F | 5' 10" (1.78 m) | 190 lb (86 kg) | 2001-05-17 | Northbrook, Illinois | Johnstown Tomahawks (NAHL) | — |
| 19 | (United States) | Nick Remissong | Sophomore | F | 6' 0" (1.83 m) | 185 lb (84 kg) | 2002-05-19 | Lake Forest, Illinois | Trail Smoke Eaters (BCHL) | — |
| 20 | (United States) | Nolan Cunningham | Sophomore | D | 6' 2" (1.88 m) | 185 lb (84 kg) | 2001-12-17 | Helena, Montana | Fairbanks Ice Dogs (NAHL) | — |
| 21 | (United States) | Liam Hansson | Junior | F | 6' 1" (1.85 m) | 185 lb (84 kg) | 2001-12-16 | Ramsey, New Jersey | Cranbrook Bucks (BCHL) | — |
| 22 | (United States) | Chris Hedden | Junior | D | 6' 0" (1.83 m) | 185 lb (84 kg) | 2002-09-20 | Kalamazoo, Michigan | Omaha Lancers (USHL) | — |
| 23 | (United States) | Nick Sajevic | Freshman | F | 5' 11" (1.8 m) | 174 lb (79 kg) | 2003-01-15 | Shoreview, Minnesota | Janesville Jets (NAHL) | — |
| 24 | (United States) | Joseph Cesario | Freshman | F | 6' 0" (1.83 m) | 185 lb (84 kg) | 2003-03-17 | Westminster, Colorado | Minnesota Wilderness (NAHL) | — |
| 26 | (United States) | Clayton Cosentino (C) | Senior | F | 6' 2" (1.88 m) | 198 lb (90 kg) | 2000-06-18 | San Carlos, California | Aberdeen Wings (NAHL) | — |
| 27 | (United States) | Samuel Stitz | Freshman | F | 6' 1" (1.85 m) | 200 lb (91 kg) | 2003-06-18 | Perry Hall, Maryland | Maryland Black Bears (NAHL) | — |
| 28 | (United States) | Mitchell Digby | Senior | D | 5' 11" (1.8 m) | 185 lb (84 kg) | 2000-06-26 | Ottawa Lake, Michigan | Lone Star Brahmas (NAHL) | — |
| 29 | (United States) | Jasper Lester | Senior | D | 5' 11" (1.8 m) | 190 lb (86 kg) | 2000-07-31 | Colorado Springs, Colorado | Fairbanks Ice Dogs (NAHL) | — |
| 30 | (United States) | Dominik Wasik | Sophomore | G | 6' 1" (1.85 m) | 165 lb (75 kg) | 2002-07-02 | Superior, Wisconsin | Steinbach Pistons (MJHL) | — |
| 35 | (United States) | Carter Clafton | Sophomore | G | 6' 2" (1.88 m) | 175 lb (79 kg) | 2002-03-13 | Grand Rapids, Minnesota | Amarillo Wranglers (NAHL) | — |
| 37 | (United States) | Toby Hopp | Freshman | G | 6' 1" (1.85 m) | 185 lb (84 kg) | 2004-06-27 | Maple Grove, Minnesota | Northeast Generals (NAHL) | — |
| 44 | (United States) | Will Staring | Sophomore | D | 6' 2" (1.88 m) | 195 lb (88 kg) | 2003-02-28 | Springfield, Virginia | Dubuque Fighting Saints (USHL) | — |
| 64 | (United States) | Brendan Gibbons | Sophomore | F | 6' 2" (1.88 m) | 205 lb (93 kg) | 2002-06-15 | South Kingstown, Rhode Island | Maine Nordiques (NAHL) | — |
| 82 | (United States) | Andrew DeCarlo | Senior | F | 6' 0" (1.83 m) | 190 lb (86 kg) | 2000-07-23 | Huntington Beach, California | Lone Star Brahmas (NAHL) | — |

== Standings ==
2024–25 Atlantic Hockey America Standings
| | Conference record | | | | | | | | | | Overall record | | | | | |
| | GP | W | L | T | OW | OL | SW | PTS | GF | GA | GP | W | L | T | GF | GA |
|---|---|---|---|---|---|---|---|---|---|---|---|---|---|---|---|---|
| Holy Cross † | 26 | 19 | 5 | 2 | 4 | 0 | 1 | 56 | 92 | 47 | 40 | 24 | 14 | 2 | 130 | 94 |
| Sacred Heart | 26 | 16 | 7 | 3 | 1 | 1 | 2 | 53 | 80 | 64 | 39 | 21 | 13 | 5 | 118 | 101 |
| #19 Bentley * | 26 | 16 | 9 | 1 | 1 | 2 | 1 | 51 | 79 | 57 | 40 | 23 | 15 | 2 | 115 | 83 |
| Niagara | 26 | 15 | 9 | 2 | 3 | 3 | 1 | 48 | 90 | 70 | 37 | 18 | 16 | 3 | 124 | 109 |
| Army | 26 | 14 | 10 | 2 | 2 | 0 | 2 | 44 | 84 | 74 | 38 | 16 | 20 | 2 | 105 | 117 |
| Canisius | 26 | 11 | 13 | 2 | 0 | 3 | 0 | 38 | 84 | 79 | 37 | 12 | 23 | 2 | 98 | 120 |
| Air Force | 26 | 11 | 13 | 2 | 2 | 3 | 1 | 37 | 59 | 58 | 40 | 16 | 21 | 3 | 86 | 112 |
| American International | 26 | 9 | 16 | 1 | 0 | 3 | 0 | 31 | 63 | 77 | 38 | 13 | 23 | 2 | 92 | 117 |
| RIT | 26 | 9 | 15 | 2 | 2 | 0 | 1 | 28 | 65 | 102 | 35 | 10 | 23 | 2 | 82 | 133 |
| Robert Morris | 26 | 7 | 15 | 4 | 1 | 2 | 1 | 27 | 72 | 86 | 35 | 10 | 20 | 5 | 95 | 115 |
| Mercyhurst | 26 | 4 | 19 | 3 | 1 | 0 | 2 | 16 | 59 | 113 | 35 | 4 | 27 | 4 | 77 | 150 |
Championship: March 22, 2025 † indicates conference regular season champion (DeGregorio Trophy) * indicates conference tournament champion (Riley Trophy); Rankings: USCHO.com Top 20 Poll

== Schedule and results ==
| Date | Time | Opponent^{#} | Rank^{#} | Site | TV | Decision | Result | Attendance | Record |
Regular Season
| October 4 | 7:05 pm | #20т Arizona State* | | Cadet Ice Arena • Colorado Springs, Colorado | FloHockey | Blessing | L 1–8 | 2,078 | 0–1–0 |
| October 5 | 7:05 pm | #20т Arizona State* | | Cadet Ice Arena • Colorado Springs, Colorado | FloHockey | Blessing | W 4–3 ^{OT} | 1,626 | 1–1–0 |
Ice Breaker Tournament
| October 11 | 8:30 pm | vs. #5 Minnesota* | | Orleans Arena • Las Vegas, Nevada (Ice Breaker Semifinal) | BTN+ | Blessing | L 1–7 | 2,152 | 1–2–0 |
| October 12 | 5:00 pm | vs. #14 Massachusetts* | | Orleans Arena • Las Vegas, Nevada (Ice Breaker Consolation) | | Blessing | L 1–5 | 1,922 | 1–3–0 |
| October 18 | 7:05 pm | Lindenwood* | | Cadet Ice Arena • Colorado Springs, Colorado | FloHockey | Blessing | W 3–2 | 1,596 | 2–3–0 |
| October 20 | 3:35 pm | Lindenwood* | | Cadet Ice Arena • Colorado Springs, Colorado | FloHockey | Blessing | W 2–1 | 1,351 | 3–3–0 |
| October 25 | 11:05 am | at American International | | MassMutual Center • Springfield, Massachusetts | FloHockey | Blessing | W 2–1 | 212 | 4–3–0 (1–0–0) |
| October 26 | 11:05 am | at American International | | MassMutual Center • Springfield, Massachusetts | FloHockey | Blessing | L 2–4 | 238 | 4–4–0 (1–1–0) |
| November 1 | 7:05 pm | at #8 Colorado College* | | Ed Robson Arena • Colorado Springs, Colorado (Rivalry) | SOCO CW | Blessing | L 2–3 ^{OT} | 3,859 | 4–5–0 |
| November 2 | 7:05 pm | #8 Colorado College* | | Cadet Ice Arena • Colorado Springs, Colorado (Rivalry) | FloHockey | Blessing | L 1–6 | 2,250 | 4–6–0 |
| November 8 | 7:05 pm | Canisius | | Cadet Ice Arena • Colorado Springs, Colorado | FloHockey, Altitude 2 | Blessing | W 2–0 | 635 | 5–6–0 (2–1–0) |
| November 9 | 1:05 pm | Canisius | | Cadet Ice Arena • Colorado Springs, Colorado | FloHockey, Altitude | Blessing | W 2–1 | 1,387 | 6–6–0 (3–1–0) |
| November 15 | 8:05 pm | Mercyhurst | | Cadet Ice Arena • Colorado Springs, Colorado | FloHockey | Blessing | W 1–0 | 2,176 | 7–6–0 (4–1–0) |
| November 16 | 8:05 pm | Mercyhurst | | Cadet Ice Arena • Colorado Springs, Colorado | FloHockey | Blessing | W 4–1 | 2,137 | 8–6–0 (5–1–0) |
| November 22 | 5:05 pm | at Bentley | | Bentley Arena • Waltham, Massachusetts | FloHockey | Blessing | L 0–2 | 1,124 | 8–7–0 (5–2–0) |
| November 23 | 2:05 pm | at Bentley | | Bentley Arena • Waltham, Massachusetts | FloHockey | Blessing | L 0–2 | 1,257 | 8–8–0 (5–3–0) |
| November 29 | 5:00 pm | at Brown* | | Meehan Auditorium • Providence, Rhode Island | ESPN+ | Blessing | T 1–1 ^{OT} | 1,054 | 8–8–1 |
| November 30 | 2:00 pm | at Brown* | | Meehan Auditorium • Providence, Rhode Island | ESPN+ | Blessing | L 2–5 | 972 | 8–9–1 |
| December 6 | 7:05 pm | Niagara | | Cadet Ice Arena • Colorado Springs, Colorado | FloHockey, Altitude 2 | Blessing | L 2–3 ^{OT} | 2,521 | 8–10–1 (5–4–0) |
| December 7 | 5:05 pm | Niagara | | Cadet Ice Arena • Colorado Springs, Colorado | FloHockey | Clafton | W 4–2 | 2,439 | 9–10–1 (6–4–0) |
| January 3 | 5:00 pm | at Sacred Heart | | Martire Family Arena • Fairfield, Connecticut | FloHockey | Blessing | L 0–3 | 1,954 | 9–11–1 (6–5–0) |
| January 4 | 3:00 pm | at Sacred Heart | | Martire Family Arena • Fairfield, Connecticut | FloHockey | Blessing | W 3–0 | 3,008 | 10–11–1 (7–5–0) |
| January 10 | 7:05 pm | Bentley | | Cadet Ice Arena • Colorado Springs, Colorado | FloHockey | Blessing | L 0–1 | 2,479 | 10–12–1 (7–6–0) |
| January 11 | 5:05 pm | Bentley | | Cadet Ice Arena • Colorado Springs, Colorado | FloHockey | Blessing | W 4–1 | 2,507 | 11–12–1 (8–6–0) |
| January 17 | 5:00 pm | at Army | | Tate Rink • West Point, New York (Rivalry) | FloHockey | Blessing | L 2–3 | 2,498 | 11–13–1 (8–7–0) |
| January 18 | 2:00 pm | at Army | | Tate Rink • West Point, New York (Rivalry) | FloHockey | Blessing | L 3–4 ^{OT} | 2,569 | 11–14–1 (8–8–0) |
| January 24 | 7:05 pm | Holy Cross | | Cadet Ice Arena • Colorado Springs, Colorado | FloHockey, Altitude 2 | Blessing | L 2–3 | 2,246 | 11–15–1 (8–9–0) |
| January 25 | 5:05 pm | Holy Cross | | Cadet Ice Arena • Colorado Springs, Colorado | FloHockey, Altitude 2 | Blessing | L 3–6 | 2,575 | 11–16–1 (8–10–0) |
| January 31 | 7:05 pm | RIT | | Cadet Ice Arena • Colorado Springs, Colorado | FloHockey | Blessing | L 1–2 | 2,327 | 11–17–1 (8–11–0) |
| February 1 | 5:05 pm | RIT | | Cadet Ice Arena • Colorado Springs, Colorado | FloHockey | Blessing | L 2–3 ^{OT} | 2,586 | 11–18–1 (8–12–0) |
| February 7 | 5:05 pm | at Canisius | | LECOM Harborcenter • Buffalo, New York | FloHockey | Blessing | W 5–3 | 683 | 12–18–1 (9–12–0) |
| February 8 | 2:05 pm | at Canisius | | LECOM Harborcenter • Buffalo, New York | FloHockey | Blessing | W 3–2 ^{OT} | 972 | 13–18–1 (10–12–0) |
| February 14 | 7:05 pm | Army | | Cadet Ice Arena • Colorado Springs, Colorado (Rivalry) | FloHockey | Blessing | L 1–2 | 2,653 | 13–19–1 (10–13–0) |
| February 15 | 5:05 pm | Army | | Cadet Ice Arena • Colorado Springs, Colorado (Rivalry) | FloHockey | Blessing | T 4–4 ^{SOL} | 2,680 | 13–19–2 (10–13–1) |
| February 21 | 5:00 pm | at Robert Morris | | Clearview Arena • Neville Township, Pennsylvania | FloHockey | Blessing | W 4–2 | 687 | 14–19–2 (11–13–1) |
| February 22 | 5:00 pm | at Robert Morris | | Clearview Arena • Neville Township, Pennsylvania | FloHockey, SNP | Blessing | T 3–3 ^{SOW} | 721 | 14–19–3 (11–13–2) |
Atlantic Hockey America Tournament
| March 1 | 5:00 pm | Robert Morris* | | Cadet Ice Arena • Colorado Springs, Colorado (AHA First Round) | FloHockey | Blessing | W 4–3 ^{2OT} | 1,355 | 15–19–3 |
| March 7 | 9:00 pm | at Sacred Heart* | | Martire Family Arena • Fairfield, Connecticut (AHA Quarterfinal Game 1) | FloHockey | Blessing | L 1–4 | 1,788 | 15–20–3 |
| March 8 | 9:00 pm | at Sacred Heart* | | Martire Family Arena • Fairfield, Connecticut (AHA Quarterfinal Game 2) | FloHockey | Blessing | W 3–2 ^{2OT} | 2,215 | 16–20–3 |
| March 9 | 7:00 pm | at Sacred Heart* | | Martire Family Arena • Fairfield, Connecticut (AHA Quarterfinal Game 3) | FloHockey | Blessing | L 1–4 | 1,709 | 16–21–3 |
*Non-conference game. ^{#}Rankings from USCHO.com Poll. All times are in Mountain Time. Source:

== Scoring statistics ==
| Name | Position | Games | Goals | Assists | Points | PIM |
|---|---|---|---|---|---|---|
| Clayton Cosentino | F | 40 | 9 | 20 | 29 | 23 |
| Chris Hedden | D | 39 | 11 | 15 | 26 | 52 |
| Austin Schwartz | F | 40 | 12 | 9 | 21 | 6 |
| Brendan Gibbons | C | 39 | 9 | 9 | 18 | 15 |
| Nolan Cunningham | D | 40 | 5 | 13 | 18 | 26 |
| Samuel Stitz | F | 39 | 8 | 8 | 16 | 8 |
| Nicholas Remissong | F | 36 | 4 | 11 | 15 | 14 |
| Mason McCormick | LW | 35 | 5 | 5 | 10 | 41 |
| Will Dawson | F | 34 | 2 | 8 | 10 | 10 |
| Holt Oliphant | F | 38 | 2 | 7 | 9 | 6 |
| Will Staring | D | 39 | 1 | 8 | 9 | 26 |
| Andrew DeCarlo | F | 35 | 5 | 2 | 7 | 31 |
| Anthony Yu | F | 29 | 3 | 4 | 7 | 8 |
| Mitchell Digby | D | 36 | 3 | 4 | 7 | 4 |
| Nick Sajevic | F | 20 | 2 | 5 | 7 | 4 |
| Ren Morque | D | 39 | 0 | 7 | 7 | 2 |
| Owen Dubois | F | 34 | 3 | 3 | 6 | 23 |
| Beau Janzig | D | 40 | 0 | 5 | 5 | 6 |
| Sam Jacobs | F | 17 | 1 | 2 | 3 | 2 |
| Michael Kadlecik | F | 22 | 0 | 3 | 3 | 4 |
| Guy Blessing | G | 39 | 0 | 2 | 2 | 0 |
| Ethan Ullrick | F | 15 | 1 | 0 | 1 | 0 |
| Jake Peterson | D | 36 | 0 | 1 | 1 | 2 |
| Carter Clafton | G | 3 | 0 | 0 | 0 | 0 |
| Will Jones | D | 3 | 0 | 0 | 0 | 0 |
| James Callahan | D | 5 | 0 | 0 | 0 | 0 |
| Jasper Lester | D | 12 | 0 | 0 | 0 | 23 |
| Total | | | 86 | 151 | 237 | 342 |

== Goaltending statistics ==
| Name | Games | Minutes | Wins | Losses | Ties | Goals against | Saves | Shutouts | SV % | GAA |
|---|---|---|---|---|---|---|---|---|---|---|
| Guy Blessing | 39 | 2367:49 | 15 | 21 | 3 | 98 | 953 | 3 | .907 | 2.48 |
| Carter Clafton | 4 | 97:03 | 1 | 0 | 0 | 5 | 35 | 0 | .875 | 3.09 |
| Empty Net | - | 35:41 | - | - | - | 9 | - | - | - | - |
| Total | 40 | 2500:33 | 16 | 21 | 3 | 112 | 988 | 3 | .898 | 2.69 |

== Rankings ==
| Poll | Week | | | | | | | | | | | | | | | | | | | | | | | | | | | |
| Poll | Pre | 1 | 2 | 3 | 4 | 5 | 6 | 7 | 8 | 9 | 10 | 11 | 12 | 13 | 14 | 15 | 16 | 17 | 18 | 19 | 20 | 21 | 22 | 23 | 24 | 25 | 26 | 27 (Final) |
|---|---|---|---|---|---|---|---|---|---|---|---|---|---|---|---|---|---|---|---|---|---|---|---|---|---|---|---|---|
| USCHO.com | NR | NR | NR | NR | NR | NR | NR | NR | NR | NR | NR | NR | – | NR | NR | NR | NR | NR | NR | NR | NR | NR | NR | NR | NR | NR | – | NR |
| USA Hockey | NR | NR | NR | NR | NR | NR | NR | NR | NR | NR | NR | NR | – | NR | NR | NR | NR | NR | NR | NR | NR | NR | NR | NR | NR | NR | NR | NR |

Note: USCHO did not release a poll in week 12 or 26.
Note: USA Hockey did not release a poll in week 12.

== Awards and honors ==
| Player | Award | Ref |
|---|---|---|
| Austin Schwartz | Atlantic Hockey Best Defensive Forward | |
