= Tim Kirby =

American ice hockey player (born 1988)

- Born: June 23, 1988 (age 36); Austin, Minnesota, USA
- Height: 6 ft 1 in (185 cm)
- Weight: 194 lb (88 kg; 13 st 12 lb)
- Position: Defense
- Shot: Right
- Played for: Air Force Falcons
- Playing career: 2008–2012

Tim Kirby (born June 23, 1988) is an American former ice hockey defenseman who played for the Air Force Falcons men's ice hockey team which competes in NCAA's Division I in the Atlantic Hockey conference. Currently, since 2019, he coaches the Air Force ACHA DIII Hockey Team who qualified for nationals in his first year (2019-2020).

== Awards and honors ==
Award	Year
Atlantic Hockey First Team	2009–10
Atlantic Hockey Third Team	2010–11
Atlantic Hockey All-Tournament Team	2011
Atlantic Hockey First Team	2011–12
AHCA East Second-Team All-American	2011–12
Atlantic Hockey All-Tournament Team	2012

Awards and achievements
Preceded by Paul Zanette	Atlantic Hockey Player of the Year; 2011–12	Succeeded by Carsen Chubak
Preceded by Denny Urban	Atlantic Hockey Best Defenseman; 2011–12	Succeeded by Adam McKenzie
