= 2019–20 Air Force Falcons men's ice hockey season =

- Conference: T–6th Atlantic Hockey
- Home ice: Cadet Ice Arena

Rankings
- USCHO.com: NR
- USA Today: NR

Record
- Overall: 12–18–6
- Conference: 10–12–6–5
- Home: 9–8–2
- Road: 3–10–4

Coaches and captains
- Head coach: Frank Serratore
- Assistant coaches: Andy Berg; Joe Doyle
- Captain: Matt Pulver

The 2019–20 Air Force Falcons men's ice hockey season was the 52nd season of play for the program and the 14th season in the Atlantic Hockey conference. The Falcons represented the United States Air Force Academy and were coached by Frank Serratore, in his 23rd season.

On March 12, 2020, Atlantic Hockey announced that the remainder of the conference tournament was cancelled due to the coronavirus pandemic.

== Departures ==
Player	Position	Nationality	Cause
Dan Bailey	Forward	United States	Graduation (Retired)
Billy Christopoulos	Goaltender	United States	Graduation (Signed with South Carolina Stingrays)
Evan Feno	Forward	United States	Graduation (Retired)
Evan Giesler	Forward	United States	Graduation (Retired)
Kyle Haak	Forward	United States	Graduation (Retired)
Tyler Jutting	Forward	United States	Left program
Matt Koch	Forward	United States	Graduation (Retired)
Matt Serratore	Forward	United States	Graduation (Retired)
Walker Sommer	Forward	United States	Transferred to Niagara

== Recruiting ==
Player	Position	Nationality	Age	Notes
Blake Bride	Forward	United States	20	Louisville, CO
Brandon Koch	Forward	United States	20	Hastings, MN
Andrew Kruse	Defenseman	United States	20	Delano, MN
Keenan Lund	Forward	United States	21	Sartell, MN
Luke Manning	Forward	United States	20	Stillwater, MN
Bennett Norlin	Forward	United States	20	Farmington, MN
Austin Park	Goaltender	United States	21	Highlands Ranch, CO, red shirt
Ty Pochipinski	Forward	United States	21	Colorado Springs, CO, transfer from Colorado College
Willie Reim	Forward	United States	20	North Oaks, MN
Luke Rowe	Defenseman	United States	21	Succasunna, NJ
Dalton Weigel	Defenseman	United States	19	Bloomington, MN

== Roster ==
As of August 16, 2019.

No.	Nat.	Player	Class	Pos	Height	Weight	DoB	Hometown	Previous team	NHL rights
2	(United States)	Andrew Kruse	Freshman	D	5' 11" (1.8 m)	185 lb (84 kg)	1998-12-06	Delano, Minnesota	Minnesota Magicians (NAHL)	—
3	(United States)	Jake Levin	Junior	D	6' 2" (1.88 m)	200 lb (91 kg)	1997-02-03	Mequon, Wisconsin	Odessa Jackalopes (NAHL)	—
4	(United States)	Luke Rowe	Freshman	D	6' 1" (1.85 m)	185 lb (84 kg)	1998-08-08	Succasunna, New Jersey	Boston Junior Bruins (NCDC)	—
6	(United States)	Alex Mehnert	Junior	D	5' 11" (1.8 m)	180 lb (82 kg)	1997-06-15	Moorhead, Minnesota	Omaha Lancers (USHL)	—
8	(United States)	Marshall Bowery	Junior	F	5' 10" (1.78 m)	170 lb (77 kg)	1996-11-17	Rochester Hills, Michigan	Topeka RoadRunners (NAHL)	—
9	(United States)	Trevor Stone	Senior	F	5' 9" (1.75 m)	185 lb (84 kg)	1996-06-03	Pleasant Plains, Illinois	Springfield Jr. Blues (NAHL)	—
10	(United States)	Keegan Mantaro	Sophomore	D	5' 9" (1.75 m)	180 lb (82 kg)	1998-12-03	Monument, Colorado	Sioux City Musketeers (USHL)	—
11	(United States)	Max Harper	Junior	F	6' 3" (1.91 m)	195 lb (88 kg)	1996-09-29	Rochester Hills, Michigan	Topeka RoadRunners (NAHL)	—
12	(United States)	Blake Bride	Freshman	F	5' 10" (1.78 m)	165 lb (75 kg)	1998-04-22	Broomfield, Colorado	Sioux Falls Stampede (USHL)	—
13	(United States)	Keenan Lund	Freshman	F	5' 11" (1.8 m)	165 lb (75 kg)	1998-08-03	Sartell, Minnesota	Minot Minotauros (NAHL)	—
15	(United States)	Bennett Norlin	Freshman	F	6' 2" (1.88 m)	190 lb (86 kg)	1998-10-26	Farmington, Minnesota	West Kelowna Warriors (BCHL)	—
17	(United States)	Joe Tyran	Senior	D	6' 0" (1.83 m)	180 lb (82 kg)	1996-03-07	Chattaroy, Washington	Bismarck Bobcats (NAHL)	—
18	(United States)	Ty Pochipinski	Sophomore	F	5' 9" (1.75 m)	170 lb (77 kg)	1998-06-05	Colorado Springs, Colorado	Penticton Vees (BCHL)	—
19	(United States)	Luke Manning	Freshman	F	5' 10" (1.78 m)	180 lb (82 kg)	1999-04-13	Stillwater, Minnesota	Des Moines Buccaneers (USHL)	—
20	(United States)	Brandon Koch	Freshman	D	6' 0" (1.83 m)	175 lb (79 kg)	1999-01-18	Hastings, Minnesota	Wenatchee Wild (BCHL)	—
21	(United States)	Matt Pulver (C)	Senior	F	5' 11" (1.8 m)	180 lb (82 kg)	1997-06-05	Chippewa Falls, Wisconsin	Aberdeen Wings (NAHL)	—
22	(United States)	Pierce Pluemer	Senior	F	6' 4" (1.93 m)	215 lb (98 kg)	1996-01-07	Phillips, Wisconsin	Odessa Jackalopes (NAHL)	—
23	(United States)	Willie Reim	Freshman	F	6' 3" (1.91 m)	200 lb (91 kg)	1999-01-11	North Oaks, Minnesota	West Kelowna Warriors (BCHL)	—
25	(United States)	Carter Ekberg	Sophomore	F	6' 2" (1.88 m)	190 lb (86 kg)	1997-05-14	Pittsburgh, Pennsylvania	Janesville Jets (NAHL)	—
26	(United States)	Erich Jaeger	Senior	F	6' 2" (1.88 m)	195 lb (88 kg)	1996-01-02	Coeur d'Alene, Idaho	Wichita Falls Wildcats (NAHL)	—
27	(United States)	Jensen Zerban	Sophomore	F	5' 11" (1.8 m)	170 lb (77 kg)	1998-11-13	Elk River, Minnesota	Jamestown Rebels (NAHL)	—
28	(United States)	Brady Tomlak	Senior	F	6' 2" (1.88 m)	205 lb (93 kg)	1996-05-14	Oakland, Michigan	Springfield Jr. Blues (NAHL)	—
29	(United States)	Shawn Knowlton	Junior	F	5' 8" (1.73 m)	165 lb (75 kg)	1996-08-14	Slingerlands, New York	Aberdeen Wings (NAHL)	—
30	(United States)	Erik Anderson	Junior	G	5' 11" (1.8 m)	190 lb (86 kg)	1996-06-10	Chanhassen, Minnesota	Pikes Peak (RMJHL)	—
31	(United States)	Zach LaRocque	Junior	G	6' 2" (1.88 m)	205 lb (93 kg)	1997-01-26	Arvada, Colorado	Cedar Rapids RoughRiders (USHL)	—
33	(United States)	Alex Schilling	Sophomore	G	6' 1" (1.85 m)	180 lb (82 kg)	1997-12-23	Medina, Minnesota	Austin Bruins (NAHL)	—
37	(United States)	Mitch Walinski	Freshman	F	6' 1" (1.85 m)	165 lb (75 kg)	1998-07-10	Lincoln, Rhode Island	Corpus Christi IceRays (NAHL)	—
41	(United States)	Austin Park	Freshman	G	5' 11" (1.8 m)	170 lb (77 kg)	1998-06-05	Highlands Ranch, Colorado	Wenatchee Wild (BCHL)	—
47	(United States)	Dalton Weigel	Freshman	D	5' 11" (1.8 m)	185 lb (84 kg)	1999-12-30	Bloomington, Minnesota	Aberdeen Wings (NAHL)	—
74	(United States)	Zack Mirageas	Junior	D	5' 9" (1.75 m)	180 lb (82 kg)	1997-07-15	Newburyport, Massachusetts	Bloomington Thunder (USHL)	—
88	(United States)	Kieran Durgan	Sophomore	F	6' 1" (1.85 m)	185 lb (84 kg)	1997-08-20	St. Johns, Michigan	Shreveport Mudbugs (NAHL)	—

== Standings ==
2019–20 Atlantic Hockey Standings
	Conference record								Overall record					
	GP	W	L	T	3/SW	PTS	GF	GA	GP	W	L	T	GF	GA
#20 American International	28	21	6	1	0	64	96	46	34	21	12	1	103	68
Sacred Heart	28	18	8	2	0	56	104	63	34	21	10	3	127	82
RIT	28	15	9	4	1	50	86	73	36	19	13	4	108	98
Army	28	14	11	3	3	48	70	64	33	17	13	3	82	76
Niagara	28	12	12	4	2	42	64	65	34	12	18	4	72	87
Air Force	28	10	12	6	5	41	60	67	34	10	18	6	70	95
Robert Morris	28	11	12	5	3	41	65	65	34	11	18	5	75	90
Bentley	28	13	13	2	0	41	75	80	34	15	16	3	83	94
Canisius	28	9	13	6	3	36	71	83	34	10	18	6	80	109
Holy Cross	28	9	16	3	2	32	67	83	34	10	19	5	80	99
Mercyhurst	28	3	23	2	0	11	49	118	34	5	27	2	64	141
Championship: March 20, 2020 † indicates conference regular season champion; * indicates conference tournament champion Rankings: USCHO.com Top 20 Poll; updated March 1, 2020

== Schedule and results ==
Date	Time	Opponent^{#}	Rank^{#}	Site	TV	Decision	Result	Attendance	Record
Exhibition
October 6	5:05 PM	vs. Trinity Western*		Cadet Ice Arena • Colorado Springs, Colorado		LaRocque	W 8–0	1,506	
Regular season
October 11	5:10 PM	at #8 Notre Dame*		Compton Family Ice Arena • Notre Dame, Indiana	NBCSN	LaRocque	L 3–4	4,977	0–1–0
October 13	1:05 PM	vs. #8 Notre Dame*		Compton Family Ice Arena • Notre Dame, Indiana	NHL Network	LaRocque	L 1–6	3,506	0–2–0
October 18	7:05 PM	vs. Arizona State*		Cadet Ice Arena • Colorado Springs, Colorado		LaRocque	L 0–3	2,028	0–3–0
October 19	7:05 PM	vs. Arizona State*		Cadet Ice Arena • Colorado Springs, Colorado		LaRocque	L 2–5	1,966	0–4–0
October 24	7:05 PM	vs. RIT		Cadet Ice Arena • Colorado Springs, Colorado		LaRocque	L 1–2	1,722	0–5–0 (0–1–0)
October 25	7:05 PM	vs. RIT		Cadet Ice Arena • Colorado Springs, Colorado		LaRocque	L 0–1	1,736	0–6–0 (0–2–0)
November 1	4:05 PM	at Sacred Heart		Webster Bank Arena • Bridgeport, Connecticut		LaRocque	L 1–7	272	0–7–0 (0–3–0)
November 2	11:04 AM	at Sacred Heart		Webster Bank Arena • Bridgeport, Connecticut		Schilling	W 4–3	271	1–7–0 (1–3–0)
November 8	7:05 PM	vs. Bentley		Cadet Ice Arena • Colorado Springs, Colorado		Schilling	W 4–2	1,921	2–7–0 (2–3–0)
November 9	7:05 PM	vs. Bentley		Cadet Ice Arena • Colorado Springs, Colorado		Schilling	W 3–2	1,711	3–7–0 (3–3–0)
November 22	5:05 PM	at Robert Morris		Colonials Arena • Neville Township, Pennsylvania		Schilling	W 2–0	686	4–7–0 (4–3–0)
November 23	5:05 PM	at Robert Morris		Colonials Arena • Neville Township, Pennsylvania		Schilling	T 1–1 ^{3x3 OTW}	824	4–7–1 (4–3–1–1)
November 29	5:05 PM	at Niagara		Dwyer Arena • Lewiston, New York		Schilling	L 3–4 ^{OT}	639	4–8–1 (4–4–1–1)
November 30	5:05 PM	vs. Niagara		Dwyer Arena • Lewiston, New York		Schilling	T 1–1 ^{3x3 OTW}	200	4–8–2 (4–4–2–2)
December 6	7:05 PM	vs. Holy Cross		Cadet Ice Arena • Colorado Springs, Colorado		Schilling	W 7–2	1,902	5–8–2 (5–4–2–2)
December 7	5:05 PM	vs. Holy Cross		Cadet Ice Arena • Colorado Springs, Colorado		Schilling	T 3–3 ^{SOW}	1,608	5–8–3 (5–4–3–3)
January 3	7:05 PM	vs. American International		Cadet Ice Arena • Colorado Springs, Colorado		Schilling	W 4–1	1,779	6–8–3 (6–4–3–3)
January 4	5:05 PM	vs. American International		Cadet Ice Arena • Colorado Springs, Colorado		Schilling	L 1–5	1,704	6–9–3 (6–5–3–3)
January 10	5:05 PM	at Army		Tate Rink • West Point, New York		Schilling	T 3–3 ^{SOL}	2,658	6–9–4 (6–5–4–3)
January 11	5:05 PM	at Army		Tate Rink • West Point, New York		Schilling	L 2–5	2,668	6–10–4 (6–6–4–3)
January 17	7:05 PM	vs. Niagara		Cadet Ice Arena • Colorado Springs, Colorado		Schilling	W 4–3	1,916	7–10–4 (7–6–4–3)
January 18	5:05 PM	vs. Niagara		Cadet Ice Arena • Colorado Springs, Colorado		Schilling	W 2–1	1,912	8–10–4 (8–6–4–3)
January 24	5:05 PM	at Holy Cross		Hart Center • Worcester, Massachusetts		Schilling	L 1–3	900	8–11–4 (8–7–4–3)
January 25	5:05 PM	at Holy Cross		Hart Center • Worcester, Massachusetts		Schilling	L 1–2	844	8–12–4 (8–8–4–3)
January 31	7:05 PM	at #20 Sacred Heart		Cadet Ice Arena • Colorado Springs, Colorado		Schilling	L 4–5 ^{OT}	1,759	8–13–4 (8–9–4–3)
February 1	5:05 PM	at #20 Sacred Heart		Cadet Ice Arena • Colorado Springs, Colorado		Schilling	L 2–5	1,981	8–14–4 (8–10–4–3)
February 7	5:35 PM	at Canisius		LECOM Harborcenter • Buffalo, New York		Schilling	T 3–3 ^{SOW}	511	8–14–5 (8–10–5–4)
February 8	2:05 PM	at Canisius		LECOM Harborcenter • Buffalo, New York		Schilling	L 0–1	1,108	8–15–5 (8–11–5–4)
February 14	7:37 PM	at Colorado College*		Broadmoor World Arena • Colorado Springs, Colorado (Battle for Pikes Peak)		Schilling	L 2–6	4,355	8–16–5 (8–11–5–4)
February 17	5:05 PM	vs. Colorado College*		Falcon Stadium • Colorado Springs, Colorado		Schilling	L 2–4	7,178	8–17–5 (8–11–5–4)
February 21	7:05 PM	vs. Mercyhurst		Cadet Ice Arena • Colorado Springs, Colorado		Schilling	T 1–1 ^{3x3 OTW}	1,713	8–17–6 (8–11–6–5)
February 22	5:05 PM	vs. Mercyhurst		Cadet Ice Arena • Colorado Springs, Colorado		Schilling	W 2–1	1,931	9–17–6 (9–11–6–5)
February 28	5:05 PM	at RIT		Gene Polisseni Center • Henrietta, New York		Schilling	W 3–0	2,070	10–17–6 (10–11–6–5)
February 29	5:05 PM	at RIT		Gene Polisseni Center • Henrietta, New York		Schilling	L 3–5	3,348	10–18–6 (10–12–6–5)
Atlantic Hockey Tournament
March 6	7:05 PM	vs. Mercyhurst*		Cadet Ice Arena • Colorado Springs, Colorado (Atlantic Hockey First Round game 1)		Schilling	W 3–1	1,208	11–18–6 (10–12–6–5)
March 7	7:05 PM	vs. Mercyhurst*		Cadet Ice Arena • Colorado Springs, Colorado (Atlantic Hockey First Round game 2)		Schilling	W 5–1	1,191	12–18–6 (10–12–6–5)
Air Force Won Series 2–0
*Non-conference game. ^{#}Rankings from USCHO.com Poll. All times are in Mountain Time.

== Scoring Statistics ==
Name	Position	Games	Goals	Assists	Points	PIM
Brady Tomlak	F	35	9	17	26	37
Zachary Mirageas	D	36	3	20	23	41
Brandon Koch	D	35	6	13	19	12
Marshall Bowery	F	31	10	6	16	6
Trevor Stone	C/LW	36	4	12	16	27
Matt Pulver	F	34	7	8	15	14
Kieran Durgan	F	24	6	7	13	4
Jacob Levin	D	36	3	10	13	20
Max Harper	F	36	9	3	12	6
Luke Manning	C	35	8	4	12	12
Willie Reim	F	32	6	6	12	18
Alex Mehnert	D	36	1	11	12	34
Blake Bride	RW	33	4	3	7	10
Luke Rowe	D	22	2	5	7	27
Shawn Knowlton	F	24	1	6	7	2
Ty Pochipinski	F	36	1	6	7	10
Carter Ekberg	D	21	1	3	4	14
Andrew Kruse	D	18	1	2	3	10
Bennett Norlin	RW	14	1	1	2	2
Pierce Plummer	LW	30	1	1	2	10
Dalton Weigel	D	16	0	2	2	6
Alex Schilling	G	31	0	1	1	0
Joe Tyran	D	33	0	1	1	0
Erich Jager	F	8	0	0	0	4
Zach LaRocque	G	9	0	0	0	0
Keenan Lund	F	23	0	0	0	4
Total						

== Goaltending statistics ==
Name	Games	Minutes	Wins	Losses	Ties	Goals against	Saves	Shut outs	SV %	GAA
Alex Schilling	31	1734	12	11	6	69	646	2	.903	2.39
Zach LaRocque	9	433	0	7	0	25	139	0	.848	3.46
Empty Net	-	26	-	-	-	8	-	-	-	-
Total	36	2194	12	18	6	102	785	2	.885	2.79

== Rankings ==
Poll	Week																							
Poll	Pre	1	2	3	4	5	6	7	8	9	10	11	12	13	14	15	16	17	18	19	20	21	22	23 (Final)
USCHO.com	NR	NR	NR	NR	NR	NR	NR	NR	NR	NR	NR	NR	NR	NR	NR	NR	NR	NR	NR	NR	NR	NR	NR	NR
USA Today	NR	NR	NR	NR	NR	NR	NR	NR	NR	NR	NR	NR	NR	NR	NR	NR	NR	NR	NR	NR	NR	NR	NR	NR

== Awards and honors ==
=== Atlantic Hockey ===
Honor	Player	Position
Best Defensive Forward	Brady Tomlak	Forward
All-Atlantic Hockey Third Team	Brandon Koch	Defenseman
All-Atlantic Hockey Rookie Team	Brandon Koch	Defenseman
