= Dave Skalko =

American ice hockey player

- Born: Gilbert, Minnesota, USA
- Height: 5 ft 10 in (178 cm)
- Weight: 150 lb (68 kg; 10 st 10 lb)
- Position: Forward
- Played for: Air Force
- NHL draft: Undrafted
- Playing career: 1969–1973
- Military career
- Allegiance: United States
- Branch: United States Air Force
- Rank: Colonel

David J. Skalko is an American retired ice hockey forward and Air Force Colonel who was the de jure NCAA Scoring Champion in 1971–72.

== Career ==
Skalko was admitted to the Air Force Academy in the fall of 1969 and joined the ice hockey team in its second season of existence. While training, he played four years of varsity hockey under the legendary Vic Heyliger. Due to the program being one of the only independent clubs in the country, Air Force's strength of schedule swung wildly from year to year. This resulted in Skalko's point total yo-yoing regardless of his play on the ice. As a junior, Skalko led the nation in scoring with 76 points, but there was a rather sizable caveat to his production. During the season Air Force had played more games against club teams (9) than University Division opponents (7). In those nine games, Air Force scored 96 goals, inflating the entire team's totals. While Air Force was a top division team, this resulted in Skalko's nation-leading total to be ignored and he wasn't even considered for any national honors. Since his 76 points was only 4 more than the next highest player, Doug Palazzari, Skalko is sometimes left off of the list for the NCAA scoring champion.

Regardless of the efficacy of Skalko's point total, the 1972 Air Force team was the first in program history to win 20 games. While the Falcon's couldn't maintain that pace in Skalko's senior season, he did end his career as the all-time leading scorer for the program. Skalko has slipped to third all-time for the Falcons as of 2020, but he sill holds the record for the most assists in a season (49) and a career (144) for the Academy.

After graduation, Skalko was commissioned as an officer and rose to the rank of Colonel before retiring.

== Personal life ==
Skalko's brother Jim also attended the Air Force Academy and the two played together on the hockey team for three seasons.

== Career statistics ==
=== Regular season and playoffs ===
			Regular Season					Playoffs
Season	Team	League	GP	G	A	Pts	PIM	GP	G	A	Pts	PIM
1969–70	Air Force	NCAA	29	19	34	53	68	—	—	—	—	—
1970–71	Air Force	NCAA	27	16	17	33	60	—	—	—	—	—
1971–72	Air Force	NCAA	31	27	49	76	33	—	—	—	—	—
1972–73	Air Force	NCAA	31	13	44	57	47	—	—	—	—	—
NCAA Totals			118	75	144	219	208	—	—	—	—	—

Awards and achievements
Preceded by Louis Frigon	NCAA Ice Hockey Scoring Champion; 1971–72	Succeeded by Rick Kennedy
