= Chuck Delich =

American ice hockey player and coach

Biographical details
- Born: 1955 (age 70–71); Eveleth, Minnesota, USA

Playing career
- 1973–1977: Air Force
- Position: Forward

Coaching career (HC unless noted)
- 1981–1985: Air Force (assistant)
- 1985–1997: Air Force

Head coaching record
- Overall: 154–197–19 (.442)

Major Charles "Chuck" Delich is a retired American ice hockey player and coach. His association with The Air Force Academy also includes being a commissioned officer until his military retirement in 1993.

== Career ==
Chuck Delich entered the Air Force Academy in the fall of 1973, joining the hockey club and immediately making an impact on the program. Delich led the Falcons in both Goals and Points in each of his four seasons, becoming not only the club's all-time leader in both (by a wide margin), but remains the NCAA's leading goal-scorer at the Division I level. Delich was twice named team MVP and served as co-captain in his senior season.

Delich began his active service after graduating but was able to return to Colorado Springs in 1981 to rejoin the hockey team as an assistant coach. Working under his former coach John Matchefts for four years, Delich was chosen as his successor and began serving as head coach in 1985. As had happened under Matchefts, Delich's tenure saw about as many winning seasons as not but he was able to shepherd the team through twelve seasons despite having few local opponents and not being part of an athletic conference. During the early part of his career Chuck was able to coach his younger brother Joe and in 1993, while still coach, Delich retired from military service as a Major. Delich stepped down as coach after the 1996–97 season, turning the reigns over to Frank Serratore.

Delich has been honored for his career several times including having the team MVP renamed in his honor a year after his retirement and being inducted into the Air Force Athletic hall of fame in 2011.

== Career statistics ==
			Regular season					Playoffs
Season	Team	League	GP	G	A	Pts	PIM	GP	G	A	Pts	PIM
1973–74	Air Force	NCAA	27	43	24	67	36	—	—	—	—	—
1974–75	Air Force	NCAA	29	38	26	64	40	—	—	—	—	—
1975–76	Air Force	NCAA	26	44	35	79	45	—	—	—	—	—
1976–77	Air Force	NCAA	27	31	38	69	30	—	—	—	—	—
NCAA totals			109	156	123	279	151	—	—	—	—	—

== Head coaching record ==
Record table
Season	Team	Overall	Conference	Standing	Postseason
Air Force Falcons Independent (1985–1997)
1985–86	Air Force	15–13–0			
1986–87	Air Force	19–10–0			
1987–88	Air Force	15–14–0			
1988–89	Air Force	14–12–3			
1989–90	Air Force	16–13–1			
1990–91	Air Force	11–17–4			
1991–92	Air Force	14–20–0			
1992–93	Air Force	8–20–2			
1993–94	Air Force	15–16–1			
1994–95	Air Force	15–17–1			
1995–96	Air Force	4–24–5			
1996–97	Air Force	8–21–2			
Air Force:		154–197–19			
Total:		154–197–19			
National champion Postseason invitational champion Conference regular season champion Conference regular season and conference tournament champion Division regular season champion Division regular season and conference tournament champion Conference tournament champion
