= 2011 Atlantic Hockey men's ice hockey tournament =

2011 Atlantic Hockey ice hockey tournament
- Dates: March 5–19, 2011
- Teams: 12
- Finals site: Blue Cross Arena; Rochester, New York
- Champions: Air Force (4th title)
- Winning coach: Frank Serratore (4th title)
- MVP: Jacques Lamoureux (Air Force)
- Atlantic Hockey Ice Hockey Tournaments

The 2011 Atlantic Hockey Tournament was the 8th Atlantic Hockey Tournament played between March 5 and March 19, 2011, at campus locations and at the Blue Cross Arena in Rochester, New York. The winner of the tournament received Atlantic Hockey's automatic bid to the 2011 NCAA Division I Men's Ice Hockey Tournament.

== Format ==
The tournament features four rounds of play. For the first round, the twelve teams in the league are divided into the two "scheduling pods" used to devise the season schedule. Within each pod, the top two seeds received a bye, while the third and fourth seeds in each pod hosted the fifth and sixth seeds for a single game, with the winners advancing to the quarterfinals.

In the quarterfinals, the teams are reseeded without reference to the pods. The top four remaining seeds will host the bottom four remaining seeds in best-of-three series, with the winners advancing to the semi-finals. In the semifinals, the highest and lowest seeds and second-highest and second-lowest seeds will play a single game each, with the winners advancing to the championship game. The tournament champion will receive an automatic bid to the 2011 NCAA Men's Division I Ice Hockey Tournament.

=== Current standings ===
Note: GP = Games played; W = Wins; L = Losses; T = Ties; PTS = Points; GF = Goals For; GA = Goals Against
The overall statistics include postseason games.

2010–11 Atlantic Hockey standings
	Conference							Overall					
	GP	W	L	T	PTS	GF	GA	GP	W	L	T	GF	GA
RIT†	27	15	5	7	37	95	64	38	19	11	8	128	99
#18 Air Force*	27	14	7	6	34	106	85	38	20	12	6	137	115
Holy Cross	27	14	8	5	33	97	73	38	17	16	5	128	118
Niagara	27	15	10	2	32	99	92	35	18	13	4	124	120
Robert Morris	27	13	9	5	31	89	72	35	18	12	5	107	97
Connecticut	27	13	12	2	28	87	90	37	15	18	4	114	133
Mercyhurst	27	12	13	2	26	98	80	37	15	18	4	131	112
Canisius	27	10	12	5	25	76	83	38	13	19	6	110	135
Army	27	10	13	4	24	69	84	35	11	20	4	86	115
Bentley	27	9	13	5	23	70	88	34	10	18	6	86	117
Sacred Heart	27	5	16	6	16	75	112	37	6	25	6	95	173
American International	27	7	19	1	15	75	113	33	8	24	1	85	140
Championship: Air Force † indicates conference regular season champion * indicates conference tournament champion Current rankings: USCHO.com/CBS College Sports Top 20 Poll

== Bracket ==
First round March 5
3E	Army	3
6E	American International	6
4E	Bentley	3
5E	Sacred Heart	6
3W	Niagara	3
6W	Canisius	6
4W	Robert Morris	1
5W	Mercyhurst	5

Quarterfinals; March 11–13
1	RIT	5	5	—
12	American International	0	1	—
2	Air Force	7	4	—
11	Sacred Heart	5	0	—
3	Holy Cross	6	2	7
8	Canisius	3	3*	3
6	Connecticut	5	4*	—
7	Mercyhurst	2	3	—

Semifinals; March 18
1	RIT	4
6	Connecticut	2
2	Air Force	3
3	Holy Cross	2

Championship; March 19
1	RIT	0
2	Air Force	1

Note: * denotes overtime period(s)

== Results ==
=== First round ===
==== (12)(6E) American International at (9)(3E) Army ====
March 5	Army	3 – 6	American International	Tate Rink	Recap
Mark Dube - pp - 03:50; Danny Colvin - 07:05		First period	01:54 - Tom Mele; 12:26 - 5x3 - Jon Puskar
No scoring		Second period	01:36 - Greg Vatrano
Matt Celin - pp - 07:50		Third period	10:11 - Adam Pleskach; 13:30 - pp - Blake Peake; 18:53 - en - Nielsson Arcibal
Jay Clark ( 20 saves / 25 shots ) Empty net ( 1 shot )		Goalie stats	Ben Meisner ( 36 saves / 39 shots )

==== (11)(5E) Sacred Heart at (10)(4E) Bentley ====
March 5	Bentley	3 – 6	Sacred Heart	John A. Ryan Arena	Recap
Dustin Cloutier - 06:14		First period	07:32 - pp - Evan Mladenoff
Jamie Nudy - 03:20; Cloutier - 13:22		Second period	No scoring
No scoring		Third period	07:54 - Mladenoff; 10:41 - Matt Gingera; 10:50 - Ben Ketchum; 12:24 - Gingera; 19:37 - en - Gingera
Joe Calvi ( 22 saves / 27 shots ) Empty net ( 1 shot )		Goalie stats	Olivier St. Onge ( 42 saves / 45 shots )

==== (8)(6W) Canisius at (4)(3W) Niagara ====
March 5	Niagara	3 – 6	Canisius	Dwyer Arena	Recap
Derek Foam - pp - 19:36		First period	01:08 - Eric Rex
No scoring		Second period	06:52 - pp - Vincent Scarsella; 09:34 - 5x3 - Preston Shupe; 11:33 - Scott Moser; 15:19 - Scarsella
Giancarlo Iuorio - 05:58; Bryan Haczyk - pp - 07:39		Third period	16:52 - Rex
Cody Campbell ( 13 saves / 17 shots ) Chris Noonan (ice hockey) ( 9 saves / 11 shots )		Goalie stats	Dan Morrison ( 48 saves / 51 shots )

==== (7)(5E) Mercyhurst at (5)(4E) Robert Morris ====
March 5	Robert Morris	1 – 5	Mercyhurst	Island Sports Center	Recap
No scoring		First period	07:02 - Scott Pitt
No scoring		Second period	08:36 - Pitt; 12:43 - Jesse Echternach
Trevor Lewis - sh - 01:59		Third period	16:35 - Taylor Holstrom; 17:59 - en - Mike Gurtler
Brooks Ostergard ( 24 saves / 28 shots ) Empty net ( 1 shot ) Eric Ferber ( 5 saves / 5 shots )		Goalie stats	Ryan Zapolski ( 30 saves / 31 shots )

=== Quarterfinals ===
==== (1) RIT vs. (12) American International ====
March 11	RIT	5 – 0	American International	Frank Ritter Memorial Ice Arena	Recap
(Burt) Bryan Potts - GW - 17:44		First period	No scoring
No scoring		Second period	No scoring
(Favot) Ben Lynch - 07:47 (Murphy, Burt) Nolan Descoteaux - 09:09 (unassisted) Mark Cornacchia - 10:16 (Saracino, Favot) Tyler Brenner - EN - 18:17		Third period	No scoring
( 28 saves / 28 shots ) Shane Madolora		Goalie stats	Ben Meisner ( 39 saves / 44 shots )

March 12	RIT	5 – 1	American International	Frank Ritter Memorial Ice Arena	Recap
No Scoring		First period	14:56 - SH - Nielsson Arcibal (unassisted)
(McReynolds, Hartley) Adam Mitchell - 04:28 (Burt, Potts) Sean Murphy - GW - 06:11 (Lynch, Brenner) Andrew Favot - 11:54 (Saracino, Noyes) Tyler Brenner - PP - 18:17		Second period	No scoring
(Cornacchia) Scott Knowles - SH EN - 19:19		Third period	No scoring
( 33 saves / 34 shots ) Shane Madolora		Goalie stats	Ben Meisner ( 46 saves / 50 shots )

RIT won series 2–0

==== (2) Air Force vs. (11) Sacred Heart ====
March 11	Air Force	7 – 5	Sacred Heart	Cadet Ice Arena	Recap
(Kirby, Mathis) John Kruse - 03:57 (Weisgarber, Kruse) George Michalke - 05:28 (Burnett, De Laurell) Jacques Lamoureux - 06:03 (Timar) Sean Bertsch - 11:11		First period	03:38 - Torin Snydeman (Delong, Gingera); 10:45 - Matt Gingera (unassisted); 18:45 - PP - Kyle Verbeek (Stretch, Lewis)
(Mathis, Kirby) Jacques Lamoureux - PP - 00:35 (Fabian, Kruse) Tony Thomas - GW - 19:07		Second period	03:18 - Anthony Yelovich (Knowlton); 06:09 - PP - Matt Gingera (Knowlton, Stuart)
(Lamoureux, Burnett) Kyle De Laurell - 16:02		Third period	No scoring
( 11 saves / 16 shots ) Jason Torf / ( 12 saves / 12 shots ) Stephen Caple		Goalie stats	Olivier St. Onge ( 6 saves / 9 shots ) / Steven Legatto ( 28 saves / 32 shots )

March 12	Air Force	4 – 0	Sacred Heart	Cadet Ice Arena	Recap
(McKenzie, Sellers) Casey Kleisinger - GW PP - 11:44		First period	No scoring
(Kleisinger, Michalke) Paul Weisgarber - 07:11		Second period	No scoring
(De Laurell) Jacques Lamoureux - 14:32 (De Laurell, Fabian) John Kruse - 16:39		Third period	No scoring
( 16 saves / 16 shots ) Jason Torf		Goalie stats	Steven Legatto ( 41 saves / 45 shots )

Air Force won series 2–0

==== (3) Holy Cross vs. (8) Canisius ====
March 11	Holy Cross	6 – 3	Canisius	Hart Center	Recap
No Scoring		First period	11:10 - Kyle Gibbons (unassisted)
(Reppucci, Nunn) Kyle Fletcher - 00:58 (Silvia, Vos) Matt Clune - 03:28		Second period	06:12 - Chris Forsman (Danowski, Kenney)
(Reppucci, Daly) Adam Schmidt - 01:36 (Linsmayer, Fletcher) Brandon Nunn - GW PP - 14:23 (unassisted) Shayne Stockton - 19:02 (unassisted) Rob Linsmayer - EN - 19:32		Third period	15:46 - Vincent Scarsella (Jenks, Lindsay)
( 22 saves / 25 shots ) Adam Roy		Goalie stats	Dan Morrison ( 24 saves / 29 shots )

March 12	Holy Cross	2 – 3	OT	Canisius	Hart Center	Recap
(Stockton, Schmidt) Everett Sheen - 17:43		First period		No scoring
(Schmidt, Daly) Everett Sheen - 03:09		Second period		No scoring
No scoring		Third period		06:12 - Chris Forsman (Conacher, Scarsella); 06:12 - Kyle Gibbons (Conacher, Scarsella)
No scoring		First overtime period		15:46 - GW - Kyle Gibbons (Bohrer, Lindsay)
( 26 saves / 29 shots ) Adam Roy		Goalie stats		Dan Morrison ( 49 saves / 51 shots )

March 13	Holy Cross	7 – 3	Canisius	Hart Center	Recap
(Vos, Fletcher) Jeffrey Reppucci - 18:50 (Schmidt, Stockton) Everett Sheen - 19:23		First period	No scoring
(Nunn, Baker) Kyle Fletcher - 03:09		Second period	07:12 - PP - Vincent Scarsella (Danford, Shupe)
(unassisted) Shayne Stockton - GW - 09:52 (Baker) Kyle Fletcher - 10:11 (Sheen, Davis) Adam Schmidt - EN - 18:43 (Clune, Daly) Kyle Fletcher - PP EN - 19:16		Third period	01:31 - Scott Jenks (Conacher, Scarsella); 05:57 - Cory Conacher (Scarsella, Shupe)
( 20 saves / 23 shots ) Adam Roy		Goalie stats	Dan Morrison ( 26 saves / 31 shots )

Holy Cross won series 2–1

==== (6) Connecticut vs. (7) Mercyhurst ====
March 11	Connecticut	5 – 2	Mercyhurst	Mark Edward Freitas Ice Forum	Recap
(Sapieha, Bergin) Corey Jendras - 05:27		First period	No scoring
(Harris, Janosz) Corey Jendras - 02:28		Second period	06:33 - John Mousso (Gurtler, Raven); 18:37 - SH - John Mousso (unassisted)
(Schneider, Waterstradt) Corey Jendras - GW - 05:00 (Sims, Encarnacao) Marcello Ranallo - 05:52 (Encarnacao, Bergin) Corey Jendras - EN - 19:57		Third period	No scoring
( 29 saves / 31 shots ) Garrett Bartus		Goalie stats	Ryan Zapolski ( 21 saves / 25 shots )

March 12	Connecticut	4 – 3	OT	Mercyhurst	Mark Edward Freitas Ice Forum	Recap
No Scoring		First period		No scoring
(Krispel, Ambrosie) Steve Bergin - 12:30 (Ranallo) Cole Schneider - 13:39 (Cooper, Winter) Billy Latta - 15:34		Second period		No scoring
No scoring		Third period		06:09 - PP - Nate Jensen (Chiasson, Pitt); 06:27 - Scott Pitt (Goebel, Holstrom); 12:11 - PP - Mike Gurtler (Blakey)
(Ambrosie, Harris) Tom Janosz - GW - 11:41		First overtime period		No scoring
( 53 saves / 56 shots ) Garrett Bartus		Goalie stats		Ryan Zapolski ( 17 saves / 20 shots ) / Max Strang ( 11 saves / 12 shots )

Connecticut won series 2–0

=== Semifinals ===
==== (1) RIT vs. (6) Connecticut ====
March 18	RIT	4 – 2	Connecticut	Blue Cross Arena	Recap
(Haltigin, Janda) Scott Knowles - 03:31 (Eckenswiller) Ben Lynch - 09:11 (unassisted) Sean Murphy - GW SH - 14:23		First period	18:25 - Cole Schneider (Gerke)
No scoring		Second period	19:53 - PP - Marcello Ranallo (Schneider, Winter)
(unassisted) Sean Murphy - 16:32		Third period	No scoring
( 39 saves / 41 shots ) Shane Madolora		Goalie stats	Garrett Bartus ( 7 saves / 10 shots ) / Matt Grogan ( 16 saves / 17 shots )

==== (2) Air Force vs. (3) Holy Cross ====
March 18	Air Force	3 – 2	Holy Cross	Blue Cross Arena	Recap
(Timar, Kozlak) Scott Mathis - 15:39		First period	No scoring
No scoring		Second period	14:50 - Shayne Stockton (Sheen)
(De Laurell, Burnett) Jacques Lamoureux - 09:26 (De Laurell, Carew) Jacques Lamoureux - 15:44		Third period	02:51 - Erik Vos (Gordon, Cox)
( 28 saves / 30 shots ) Jason Torf		Goalie stats	Adam Roy ( 18 saves / 21 shots )

=== Championship ===
==== (1) RIT vs. (2) Air Force ====
March 19	RIT	0 – 1	Air Force	Blue Cross Arena	Recap
No Scoring		First period	No scoring
No scoring		Second period	13:41 - Jacques Lamoureux (Kirby, Torf)
No scoring		Third period	No scoring
( 23 saves / 24 shots ) Shane Madolora		Goalie stats	Jason Torf ( 40 saves / 40 shots )

== Tournament awards ==
=== All-Tournament Team ===
- G Jason Torf (Air Force)
- D Tim Kirby (Air Force)
- D Scott Mathis (Air Force)
- F Jacques Lamoureux* (Air Force)
- F Sean Murphy (RIT)
- F Cole Schneider (Connecticut)

* Most Valuable Player(s)
