= Frank Serratore =

American ice hockey coach (born 1957)

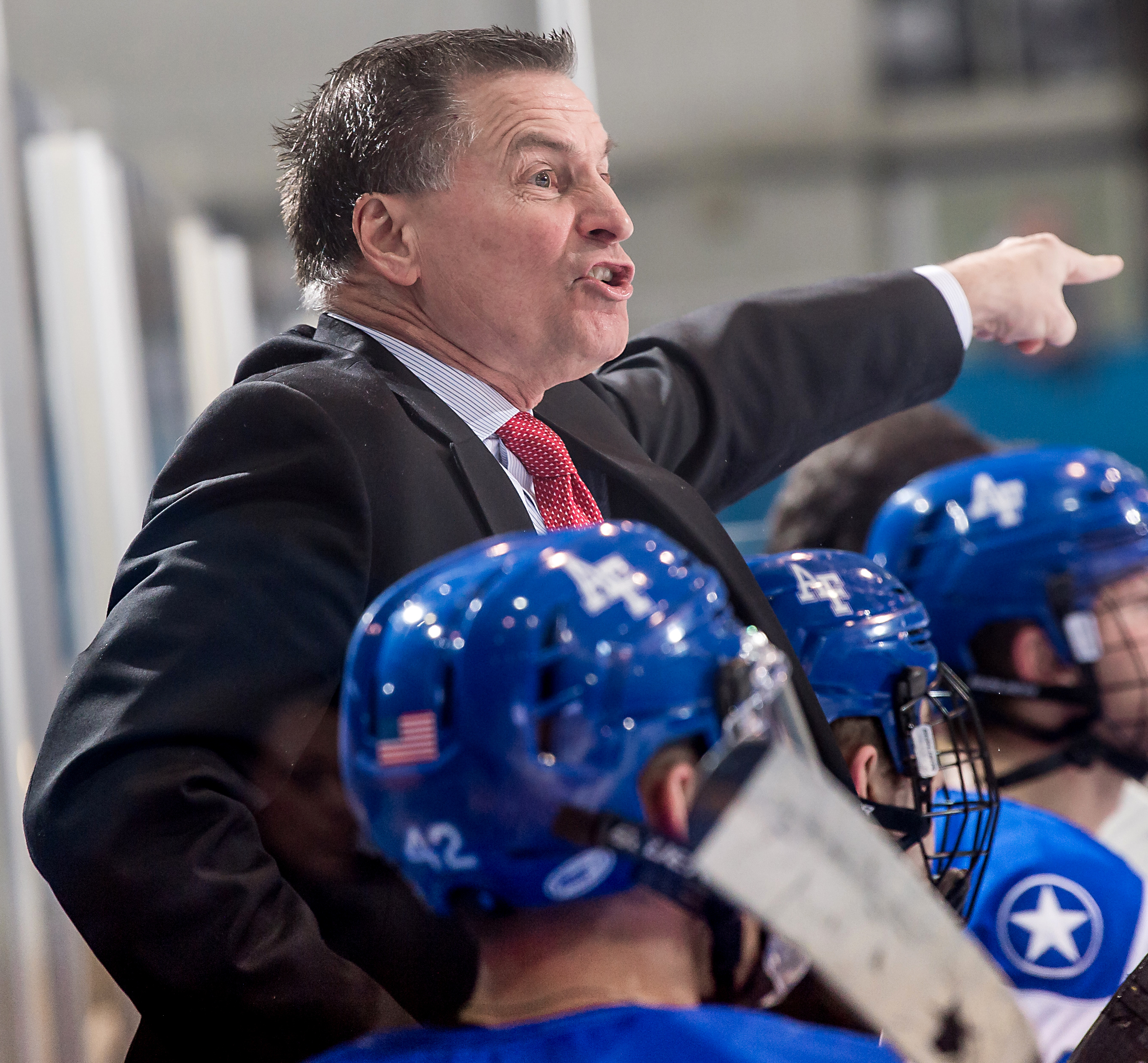
- Serratore at Cadet Ice Arena in 2018

Current position
- Title: Head coach
- Team: Air Force
- Conference: AHA
- Record: 490–472–106 (.508)

Biographical details
- Born: August 24, 1957 (age 69); Coleraine, Minnesota, USA

Playing career
- 1975–1977: St. Paul Vulcans
- 1977–1979: Western Michigan
- 1980–1982: Bemidji State
- 1982: Nashville South Stars
- Position: Goaltender

Coaching career (HC unless noted)
- 1982–1985: Austin Mavericks
- 1985–1987: Rochester Mustangs
- 1987–1989: North Dakota (assistant)
- 1989–1990: Omaha Lancers
- 1990–1994: Denver
- 1994–1996: Minnesota Moose
- 1997–Present: Air Force
- 2003: US Under-17 Team

Head coaching record
- Overall: 539–564–115 (.490)
- Tournaments: 3–7 (.300)

Accomplishments and honors

Championships
- 7× Atlantic Hockey tournament champion (2007, 2008, 2009, 2011, 2012, 2017, 2018); 2× Atlantic Hockey regular season champion (2009, 2012)

Awards
- 1984 USHL Coach of the Year; 2× USHL General Manager of the Year (1985, 1990); 1990 Omaha Sportscaster Sportsmen of the Year

Frank Serratore (born August 24, 1957) is an American ice hockey coach, currently with the Air Force Falcons men's ice hockey team. He formerly coached professional hockey in the International Hockey League with the Minnesota Moose from 1994 to 1996.

== Career ==
Serratore played two seasons with the St. Paul Vulcans of the Midwest Junior Hockey League and later joined the Western Michigan Broncos men's ice hockey program while earning his degree in physical education and athletic administration. He also had a short stint with the Nashville South Stars of the Central Hockey League in 1981–82.

Serratore began his coaching career in 1982 with the Austin Mavericks (later the Rochester Mustangs) of the United States Hockey League. After five successful seasons, he moved on become an assistant coach with the University of North Dakota Fighting Sioux for two seasons. He then returned to the USHL for one season as head coach and general manager of the Omaha Lancers. During his time in the USHL, Serratore won three league championships. In 1990, Serratore was hired as the head coach of the University of Denver Pioneers and spent four seasons behind their bench.

Serratore made the jump to professional hockey in 1994 when he was hired as the head coach and director of hockey operations of the Minnesota Moose, an expansion team in the International Hockey League. The Moose lasted only two seasons in Minnesota before relocating to Winnipeg, Manitoba. Serratore remained with the Manitoba Moose as director of hockey operations for one season, but Jean Perron was brought by the new ownership group to replace him as head coach.

Since 1997, Serratore has been the head coach of the Air Force Falcons men's hockey team. During his tenure, the Falcons have won five Atlantic Hockey conference championships. He is also part of USA Hockey's development program and coached the United States Under-17 team to a gold medal at the Five Nations Tournament in Sweden.

== Personal life ==
Serratore is a native of Coleraine, Minnesota, and a graduate of Greenway High School. He and his wife Carol reside in Colorado Springs, Colorado, and have four children. His brother Tom coaches at Bemidji State University.

== Awards ==
- 1983–84 USHL Coach of the Year
- 1984–85 USHL General Manager of the Year
- 1990 Omaha Sportscaster Sportsmen of the Year
- 1989–90 USHL General Manager of the Year

== Coaching record ==
=== Amateur ===
Team	Year	Regular season							Postseason
Team	Year	G	W	L	T	OTL	Pts	Finish	Result
Austin	1982–1983	48	23	23	2	0	48	4th in league	
Austin	1983–1984	48	35	11	0	2	72	2nd in league	
Austin	1984–1985	48	38	8	1	2	79	1st in league	Won championship
Rochester	1985–1986	48	32	11	2	3	69	2nd in league	
Rochester	1986–1988	48	37	9	0	2	76	1st in league	Won championship
Omaha	1989–1990	48	36	11	0	1	73	1st in league	Won championship
Totals		288	202	73	5	8	417		

=== Professional ===
Team	Year	Regular season							Postseason
Team	Year	G	W	L	T	OTL	Pts	Finish	Result
Minnesota	1994–1995	81	34	35	0	12	80	4th in Central	Lost round 1
Minnesota	1995–1996	82	30	45	0	7	67	5th in Midwest	DNQ
Totals		163	64	80	0	19	147		

=== Collegiate ===
Record table
Season	Team	Overall	Conference	Standing	Postseason
Denver Pioneers (WCHA) (1990–1994)
1990–91	Denver	6–30–2	5–25–2	9th	
1991–92	Denver	9–25–2	8–22–2	9th	
1992–93	Denver	19–17–2	15–15–2	6th	WCHA first round
1993–94	Denver	15–20–3	11–18–3	9th	WCHA first round
Denver:		49–92–9	39–80–9		
Air Force Falcons Independent (1997–1999)
1997–98	Air Force	15–19–0			
1998–99	Air Force	15–19–2			
Air Force:		30–38–2			
Air Force Falcons (CHA) (1999–2006)
1999-00	Air Force	19–18–2	6–10–0	4th	CHA third-place game (loss)
2000–01	Air Force	16–17–4	8–10–2	4th	CHA third-place game (Tie)
2001–02	Air Force	16–16–2	6–10–2	5th	CHA Semifinals
2002–03	Air Force	10–24–3	2–15–3	6th	CHA Quarterfinals
2003–04	Air Force	14–21–2	6–13–1	4th	CHA Quarterfinals
2004–05	Air Force	14–19–3	5–14–1	5th	CHA Semifinals
2005–06	Air Force	11–20–1	8–12–0	4th	CHA Quarterfinals
Air Force:		100–135–17	41–94–9		
Air Force Falcons (Atlantic Hockey) (2006–2024)
2006–07	Air Force	19–16–5	16–10–5	5th	NCAA West Regional semifinals
2007–08	Air Force	21–12–6	14–9–5	3rd	NCAA Northeast Regional semifinals
2008–09	Air Force	28–11–2	20–6–2	t-1st	NCAA East Regional Final
2009–10	Air Force	16–15–6	14–8–6	3rd	Atlantic Hockey Semifinals
2010–11	Air Force	20–12–6	14–7–6	2nd	NCAA East Regional semifinals
2011–12	Air Force	21–11–7	15–6–6	1st	NCAA Northeast Regional semifinals
2012–13	Air Force	17–13–7	15–7–5	2nd	Atlantic Hockey Quarterfinals
2013–14	Air Force	21–14–4	15–9–3	t-3rd	Atlantic Hockey Quarterfinals
2014–15	Air Force	16–21–4	13–12–3	t-6th	Atlantic Hockey Quarterfinals
2015–16	Air Force	20–12–5	16–7–5	t-2nd	Atlantic Hockey Semifinals
2016–17	Air Force	27–10–5	19–6–3	2nd	NCAA East Regional Final
2017–18	Air Force	23–15–5	13–11–4	t-3rd	NCAA West Regional Final
2018–19	Air Force	16–15–5	14–10–4	3rd	Atlantic Hockey Quarterfinals
2019–20	Air Force	12–18–6	10–12–6–5	6th	Tournament Cancelled
2020–21	Air Force	3–10–1	3–9–1	10th	Atlantic Hockey First round
2021–22	Air Force	16–17–3	11–12–3	6th	Atlantic Hockey Runner-Up
2022–23	Air Force	12–22–2	8–17–1	10th	
2023–24	Air Force	18–19–1	15–10–1	4th	Atlantic Hockey Quarterfinals
Air Force:		326–273–80	245–168–69		
Air Force Falcons (AHA) (2024–present)
2024–25	Air Force	16–21–3	11–13–2	7th	AHA Quarterfinals
2025–26	Air Force	18–15–4	13–10–3	6th	AHA Quarterfinals
Air Force:		34–36–7	24–23–5		
Total:		539–564–115			
National champion Postseason invitational champion Conference regular season champion Conference regular season and conference tournament champion Division regular season champion Division regular season and conference tournament champion Conference tournament champion

== See also ==
- List of college men's ice hockey coaches with 400 wins

Sporting positions
Preceded by Position created	Head coach & General Manager of the Minnesota Moose; 1994–1996	Succeeded by Jean Perron (Manitoba Moose)
Awards and achievements
Preceded by Derek Schooley	Atlantic Hockey Coach of the Year; 2015–16	Succeeded by Dave Smith
