= 2012 Atlantic Hockey men's ice hockey tournament =

Atlantic Hockey Tournament (2012)

2012 Atlantic Hockey Men's ice hockey tournament
- Dates: March 2–17, 2012
- Teams: 12
- Finals site: Blue Cross Arena; Rochester, New York
- Champions: Air Force (5th title)
- Winning coach: Frank Serratore (5th title)
- MVP: Jason Torf (Air Force)
- Atlantic Hockey Men's Ice Hockey Tournaments

The 2012 Atlantic Hockey Tournament was the 9th Atlantic Hockey Tournament. It was played between March 2 and March 17, 2012 at campus locations and at the Blue Cross Arena in Rochester, New York, United States. Air Force won their 5th tournament and earned Atlantic Hockey's automatic bid to the 2012 NCAA Division I Men's Ice Hockey Tournament after defeating RIT in the championship game.

== Format ==
The tournament features four rounds of play. In the first round the fifth and twelfth, sixth and eleventh, seventh and tenth, and eighth and ninth seeds, as determined by the conference regular season standings, play a best-of-three series with the winners advancing to the quarterfinals. The top four teams from the conference regular season standings receive a bye to the quarterfinals. There, the first seed and lowest-ranked first-round winner, the second seed and second-lowest-ranked first-round winner, the third seed and second-highest-ranked first-round winner, and the fourth seed and the highest-ranked first-round winner play a best-of-three series, with the winners advancing to the semifinals. In the semifinals, the highest and lowest seeds and second-highest and second-lowest seeds play a single game, with the winner advancing to the championship game. The tournament champion received an automatic bid to the 2012 NCAA Division I Men's Ice Hockey Tournament.

=== Current standings ===
Note: GP = Games played; W = Wins; L = Losses; T = Ties; PTS = Points; GF = Goals For; GA = Goals Against

2011–12 Atlantic Hockey standings
	Conference record							Overall record					
	GP	W	L	T	PTS	GF	GA	GP	W	L	T	GF	GA
#16 Air Force†*	27	15	6	6	36	85	52	39	21	11	7	119	83
Niagara	27	14	6	7	35	80	53	37	17	11	9	101	81
RIT	27	14	7	6	34	72	52	39	20	13	6	99	86
Mercyhurst	27	15	8	4	34	79	68	40	20	16	4	111	116
Holy Cross	27	15	8	4	34	93	70	39	20	15	4	120	107
Bentley	27	13	7	7	33	81	59	40	16	16	8	114	109
Robert Morris	27	13	9	5	31	72	58	39	17	17	5	102	103
Connecticut	27	12	12	3	27	78	67	39	16	19	4	112	105
Canisius	27	10	14	3	23	54	74	36	10	22	4	66	111
American International	27	6	18	3	15	57	98	37	8	26	3	82	137
Sacred Heart	27	4	20	3	11	66	122	37	6	28	3	84	173
Army	27	3	19	5	11	52	96	34	4	23	7	65	120
Championship: Air Force 4, RIT 0 † indicates conference regular season champion; * indicates conference tournament champion Rankings: USCHO.com Top 20 Poll

== Bracket ==
First round March 2–4
5	Holy Cross	3	5	—
12	Army	2	2	—
6	Bentley	5	2	5
11	Sacred Heart	3	4	0
7	Robert Morris	5	5	4*
10	American International	3	7	3
8	Connecticut	4*	3	—
9	Canisius	3	0	—

Quarterfinals; March 9–11
1	Air Force	4	1	4
8	Connecticut	3	3	3
2	Niagara	3	2	—
7	Robert Morris	0	1	—
3	RIT	1	5**	3
6	Bentley	4	4	0
4	Mercyhurst	2	1	3
5	Holy Cross	1	3	1

Semifinals; March 16
1	Air Force	5
4	Mercyhurst	2
2	Niagara	1
3	RIT	2*

Championship; March 17
1	Air Force	4
3	RIT	0

Note: * denotes overtime period(s)

== Results ==
=== First round ===
==== (5) Holy Cross vs. (12) Army ====
March 2	Holy Cross	3 – 2	Army	Hart Center	Recap
(Davis, Stockton) Brandon Nunn - 05:48 (Daly, Stockton) Erik Vos - 17:05		First period	10:36 - Andy Starczewski (Lalor, Hull)
(Silvia, Atkins) Shayne Stockton - GW PP - 09:55		Second period	18:31 - Bryant Skarda (Day)
No scoring		Third period	No scoring
( 19 saves / 21 shots ) Matt Ginn		Goalie stats	Ryan Leets ( 36 saves / 39 shots )

March 3	Holy Cross	5 – 2	Army	Hart Center	Recap
(Nagy, Cox) Adam Schmidt - 08:15 (Vos) Shayne Stockton - 09:20		First period	No scoring
(unassisted) Matt Clune - GW PP - 08:56		Second period	No scoring
(Schmidt, Daly) Andrew Cox - PP - 12:50 (Nagy) Kyle Fletcher - EN - 19:02		Third period	06:04 - PP - Marcel Alvarez (Mau. Alvarez, Starczewski); 18:35 - Mike Hull (Starczewski, Colvin)
( 20 saves / 22 shots ) Matt Ginn		Goalie stats	Ryan Leets ( 36 saves / 40 shots )

Holy Cross won series 2–0

==== (6) Bentley vs. (11) Sacred Heart ====
March 2	Bentley	5 – 3	Sacred Heart	John A. Ryan Arena	Recap
(Switzer, Gensler) Alex Grieve - 13:37 (Campanelli, Stonacek) Justin Breton - 17:50		First period	04:13 - Chad Filteau (Gingera, George)
(Weinstein) Brett Gensler - 09:55 (Gensler, Rickord) Alex Grieve - GW - 14:23		Second period	03:10 - Chad Filteau (Gingera)
(Bonnett, Switzer) Brett Gensler - EN - 18:56		Third period	03:10 - Torin Snydeman (unassisted)
( 21 saves / 24 shots ) Branden Komm		Goalie stats	Andrew Bodnarchuk ( 37 saves / 41 shots )

March 3	Bentley	2 – 4	Sacred Heart	John A. Ryan Arena	Recap
(Switzer) Joe Campanelli - 01:35		First period	04:49 - Matt Gingera (Filteau, Felice); 15:14 - Matt Gingera (Rayner, Eng)
(Ledford, Breton) Joe Campanelli - 01:20		Second period	04:22 - GW - Matt Gingera (George, Filteau)
No scoring		Third period	16:11 - Drew George (Gingera)
( 14 saves / 18 shots ) Branden Komm		Goalie stats	Andrew Bodnarchuk ( 31 saves / 33 shots )

March 4	Bentley	5 – 0	Sacred Heart	John A. Ryan Arena	Recap
(Weinstein, Switzer) Brett Gensler - GW - 19:12		First period	No scoring
(unassisted) Alex Kubiak - 09:20 (Kubiak) Dan Koudys - 18:02		Second period	No scoring
(unassisted) Jared Rickord - 07:04 (Grieve, Gensler) Brett Switzer - 18:02		Third period	No scoring
( 24 saves / 24 shots ) Branden Komm		Goalie stats	Andrew Bodnarchuk ( 31 saves / 36 shots )

Bentley won series 2–1

==== (7) Robert Morris vs. (10) American International ====
March 2	Robert Morris	5 – 3	American International	Island Sports Center	Recap
(Brace, Wydo) Tyson Wilson - PP - 16:08		First period	04:13 - PP - Adam Pleskach (Ceccacci, Arcibal)
No scoring		Second period	09:11 - Nathan Sliwinski (Penny, Markiewicz); 10:57 - Michael Penny (Sandor, Pleskach)
(Hinds, Lewis) Adam Brace - 05:40 (Lewis, Crichton) Adam Brace - PP - 10:59 (Crichton, Hinds) Trevor Lewis - GW - 18:56 (Lewis, Crichton) Adam Brace - 16:55		Third period	No scoring
( 27 saves / 30 shots ) Brooks Ostergard		Goalie stats	Ben Meisner ( 35 saves / 40 shots )

March 3	Robert Morris	5 – 7	American International	Island Sports Center	Recap
(Brace, Lewis) Cody Crichton - 04:38 (Cramer) Zach Hervato - 5:17 (Cartier, Lewis) Adam Brace - EA - 14:30		First period	00:42 - Jon Puskar (Penny, Ceccacci); 05:55 - Alexander MacMillan (Grasso, Ceccacci)
(unassisted) Cody Wydo - 09:23 (Cartier) Evan Renwick - 17:25		Second period	02:21 - Jason Popek (Sandor, Cassidy); 04:53 - Nick Sandor (Popek, Ceccacci); 11:40 - Michael Penny (Puskar, Markiewicz); 15:52 - GW PP - Jeff Ceccacci (Arcibal, Sandor)
No scoring		Third period	09:35 - Jon Puskar (Mele, Penny)
( 28 saves / 35 shots ) Brooks Ostergard		Goalie stats	Ben Meisner ( 42 saves / 47 shots )

March 4	Robert Morris	4 – 3	OT	American International	Island Sports Center	Recap
(Lyle) Colin South - 02:36		First period		No scoring
(Jacklin, Lewis) Nick Chiavetta - PP - 08:01		Second period		No scoring
(unassisted) Jared Rickord - PP - 03:34		Third period		05:55 - Nielsson Arcibal (Pleskach, Penny); 11:39 - Nielsson Arcibal (Ceccacci); 19:49 - EA - Nielsson Arcibal (Pleskach, Ceccacci)
(Cramer, Hervato) Brandon Blandina - GW - 02:13		First overtime period		No scoring
( 26 saves / 29 shots ) Brooks Ostergard		Goalie stats		Ben Meisner ( 54 saves / 58 shots )

Robert Morris won series 2–1

==== (8) Connecticut vs. (9) Canisius ====
March 2	Connecticut	4 – 3	OT	Canisius	Freitas Ice Forum	Recap
(Schneider, Ambrosie) Billy Latta - PP - 06:21 (Waterstradt, Ambrosie) Brant Harris - 10:02		First period		04:34 - Cody Freeman (Sullivan)
(Poe, Gerke) Cole Schneider - 13:31		Second period		03:57 - Mitch McCrank (Day); 09:51 - Tyler Wiseman (McCrank, Law)
No scoring		Third period		No scoring
(Ambrosie, Schneider) Alex Gerke - 11:11		First overtime period		No scoring
( 36 saves / 39 shots ) Garrett Bartus		Goalie stats		Dan Morrison ( 20 saves / 24 shots )

March 3	Connecticut	4 – 0	Canisius	Freitas Ice Forum	Recap
(Harris, Gerke) Cole Schneider - GW - 07:57 (Smith, Janosz) Ryan Tyson - 09:25		First period	No scoring
No scoring		Second period	No scoring
(Sharib, Harris) Jordan Sims - 14:58 (Ambrosie) Brant Harris - SH EN - 16:56		Third period	No scoring
( 26 saves / 26 shots ) Garrett Bartus		Goalie stats	Dan Morrison ( 22 saves / 25 shots )

Connecticut won series 2–0

=== Quarterfinals ===
==== (1) Air Force vs. (8) Connecticut ====
March 9	Air Force	4 – 3	Connecticut	Cadet Ice Arena	Recap
(Weissenhofer, McKenzie) Scott Holm - 06:11		First period	03:15 - Brad Smith (unassisted)
(Holm, Weissenhofer) Ryan Timar - 17:47 (Kirby, Thomas) Casey Kleisinger - 18:10		Second period	06:30 - Billy Latta (Waterstradt, Sharib)
(Carew, Kirby) Kyle De Laurell - GW - 11:13		Third period	14:56 - Brad Cooper (Schneider)
( 8 saves / 11 shots ) Jason Torf / ( 10 saves / 10 shots ) Stephen Caple		Goalie stats	Garrett Bartus ( 38 saves / 42 shots )

March 10	Air Force	1 – 3	Connecticut	Cadet Ice Arena	Recap
No Scoring		First period	14:56 - SH - Trevor Gerling (Jendras, Schneider)
(Timar, Michalke) Scott Holm - 06:35		Second period	00:48 - GW PP - Brant Harris (Schneider, Ambrosie)
No scoring		Third period	18:44 - EN - Cole Schneider (unassisted)
( 2 saves / 3 shots ) Jason Torf / ( 9 saves / 10 shots ) Stephen Caple		Goalie stats	Garrett Bartus ( 46 saves / 47 shots )

March 11	Air Force	4 – 3	Connecticut	Cadet Ice Arena	Recap
(Weisgarber, McKenzie) Scott Holm - PP - 09:13		First period	15:44 - Cole Schneider (Gerke, Cooper)
(Mathis, Kleisinger) Tim Kirby - 14:11 (McKenzie) Jason Fabian - 18:17		Second period	07:53 - Cole Schneider (Schneider, Ambrosie); 15:40 - PP - Corey Jendras (Poe, Ranallo)
(Gunner) George Michalke - GW - 03:21		Third period	No scoring
( 28 saves / 31 shots ) Stephen Caple		Goalie stats	Garrett Bartus ( 33 saves / 37 shots )

Air Force won series 2–1

==== (2) Niagara vs. (7) Robert Morris ====
March 9	Niagara	3 – 0	Robert Morris	Dwyer Arena	Recap
No Scoring		First period	No scoring
(Rashid) Matt Williams - GW - 04:38 (Iuorio, Divjak) Isaac Kohls - 05:11		Second period	No scoring
(Kohls, Williams) Giancarlo Iuorio - EN - 19:59		Third period	No scoring
( 22 saves / 22 shots ) Chris Noonan		Goalie stats	Brooks Ostergard ( 29 saves / 31 shots )

March 10	Niagara	2 – 1	Robert Morris	Dwyer Arena	Recap
(Ryan, Iuorio) Isaac Kohls - 17:41		First period	16:26 - Tyler Hinds (unassisted)
No scoring		Second period	No scoring
(unassisted) Chris Lochner - GW - 19:45		Third period	No scoring
( 26 saves / 27 shots ) Chris Noonan		Goalie stats	Brooks Ostergard ( 42 saves / 44 shots )

Niagara won series 2–0

==== (3) RIT vs. (6) Bentley ====
March 9	RIT	1 – 4	Bentley	Frank Ritter Memorial Ice Arena	Recap
(Burt, Haltigin) Michael Colavecchia - 10:40		First period	04:47 - Brett Gensler (Switzer, Campanelli)
No scoring		Second period	04:45 - GW - Brett Gensler (Williams, Grieve)
No scoring		Third period	18:47 - EN - Brett Switzer (Bonnett); 19:26 - EN - Joe Campanelli (Breton, Bonnett)
( 23 saves / 26 shots ) Shane Madolora		Goalie stats	Branden Komm ( 46 saves / 47 shots )

March 10	RIT	5 – 4	2OT	Bentley	Frank Ritter Memorial Ice Arena	Recap
(Burt, Colavecchia) Chris Haltigin - 09:00 (Garbowsky, Lynch) Adam Mitchell - 16:09		First period		No scoring
(Burt, Colavecchia) Jeff Smith - 11:02 (McReynolds) Matt Garbowsky - SH - 14:41		Second period		11:02 - Dan Koudys (Rickord, Kubiak); 19:09 - Alex Grieve (Maher, Weinstein)
No scoring		Third period		08:16 - Brett Switzer (Maher, Gensler); 11:31 - Brett Hartung (Switzer, Nudy)
(Smith) Cameron Burt - GW - 01:23		Second overtime period		No scoring
( 42 saves / 46 shots ) Shane Madolora		Goalie stats		Branden Komm ( 58 saves / 63 shots )

March 11	RIT	3 – 0	Bentley	Frank Ritter Memorial Ice Arena	Recap
(Cornacchia, McGowan) Adam Mitchell - GW - 05:35		First period	No scoring
No scoring		Second period	No scoring
(Eckenswiller, Garbowsky) Taylor McReynolds - 04:38 (unassisted) Taylor McReynolds - 10:06		Third period	No scoring
( 24 saves / 24 shots ) Shane Madolora		Goalie stats	Branden Komm ( 30 saves / 33 shots )

RIT won series 2–1

==== (4) Mercyhurst vs. (5) Holy Cross ====
March 9	Mercyhurst	2 – 1	Holy Cross	Mercyhurst Ice Center	Recap
(Nagtzaam, Blakey) Daniel Bahntge - 04:59		First period	02:25 - PP - Erik Vos (Stockton, Silvia)
(Shiplo, Noble) Daniel Bahntge - GW - 01:27		Second period	No scoring
No scoring		Third period	No scoring
( 29 saves / 30 shots ) Max Strang		Goalie stats	Matt Ginn ( 15 saves / 17 shots )

March 10	Mercyhurst	1 – 3	Holy Cross	Mercyhurst Ice Center	Recap
No Scoring		First period	No scoring
No scoring		Second period	14:18 - Adam Schmidt (Daly, Clune); 06:27 - SH GW - Andrew Cox (unassisted)
(Elliott, Bodo) Tyler Shiplo - 07:41		Third period	19:44 - EN - Adam Schmidt (unassisted)
( 41 saves / 43 shots ) Max Strang		Goalie stats	Matt Ginn ( 25 saves / 26 shots )

March 11	Mercyhurst	3 – 1	Holy Cross	Mercyhurst Ice Center	Recap
(O'Donoghue, Jones) Paul Chiasson - PP - 02:31		First period	09:57 - PP - Matt Clune (Cox, Schmidt)
(O'Donoghue, Jones) Matthew Zay - GW - 13:27		Second period	No scoring
(O'Donoghue, Misiak) Matthew Zay - 01:21		Third period	No scoring
( 41 saves / 42 shots ) Max Strang		Goalie stats	Matt Ginn ( 24 saves / 27 shots )

Mercyhurst won series 2–1

=== Semifinals ===
==== (1) Air Force vs. (4) Mercyhurst ====
March 16	Air Force	5 – 2	Mercyhurst	Blue Cross Arena	Recap
(Carew) Cole Gunner - 01:40 (Carew, McKenzie) Paul Weisgarber - PP - 13:28		First period	06:27 - Daniel O'Donoghue (Zay, Misiak)
(De Laurell) John Kruse - GW - 03:49		Second period	No scoring
(Kleisinger, Mathis) Jason Fabian - 18:13 (Timar, Fabian) Paul Weisgarber - EN - 19:10		Third period	02:01 - Derek Elliott (Chiasson)
( 23 saves / 25 shots ) Jason Torf		Goalie stats	Max Strang ( 37 saves / 41 shots )

==== (2) Niagara vs. (3) RIT ====
March 16	Niagara	1 – 2	OT	RIT	Blue Cross Arena	Recap
No Scoring		First period		No scoring
No scoring		Second period		No scoring
(unassisted) Chris Lochner - 14:40		Third period		03:25 - Matt Garbowsky (McReynolds)
No scoring		First overtime period		02:57 - GW - Taylor McReynolds (Eckenswiller, McGowan)
( 36 saves / 38 shots ) Chris Noonan		Goalie stats		Shane Madolora ( 24 saves / 25 shots )

=== Championship ===
==== (1) Air Force vs. (3) RIT ====
March 19	Air Force	4 – 0	RIT	Blue Cross Arena	Recap
(Kirby, Weisgarber) Cole Gunner - GW PP - 15:15 (Demers, McKenzie) John Kruse - 16:25		First period	No scoring
(Thomas, Kleisinger) Jason Fabian - 09:23		Second period	No scoring
(Weisgarber) Jason Fabian - EN - 19:53		Third period	No scoring
( 34 saves / 34 shots ) Jason Torf		Goalie stats	Shane Madolora ( 23 saves / 27 shots )

== Tournament awards ==
=== All-Tournament Team ===
- G Jason Torf* (Air Force)
- D Tim Kirby (Air Force)
- D Scott Mathis (Air Force)
- F Taylor MacReynolds (RIT)
- F Cole Gunner (Air Force)
- F Paul Weisgarber (Air Force)

* Most Valuable Player(s)
