= Air Force Falcons men's ice hockey =

College men's ice hockey team representing the United States Air Force Academy

- Current season
- University: United States Air Force Academy
- Conference: AHA
- First season: 1968–69
- Head coach: Frank Serratore; 30th season, 490–472–106 (.508)
- Assistant coaches: Andy Berg; Joe Doyle; Steve Jennings
- Arena: Cadet Ice Arena; USAF Academy, Colorado
- Colors: Blue and silver

NCAA tournament appearances
- 2007, 2008, 2009, 2011, 2012, 2017, 2018

Conference tournament champions
- AHA: 2007, 2008, 2009, 2011, 2012, 2017, 2018

Conference regular season champions
- AHA: 2009, 2012

Current uniform

The Air Force Falcons men's ice hockey team is a National Collegiate Athletic Association (NCAA) Division I college ice hockey program that represents the United States Air Force Academy. The Falcons are a member of Atlantic Hockey America. They play at the Cadet Ice Arena in El Paso County, Colorado, north of Colorado Springs. The Falcons have reached the NCAA Division I men's ice hockey tournament seven times in program history. It is the most appearances for a program without reaching the Frozen Four as of 2025.

== History ==
=== Independent ===
Air Force Academy's ice hockey program began as a club team in 1966, led by former Michigan head coach and six-time national champion Vic Heyliger. The program grew swiftly and posted a winning record by its third season. In their fourth season, the team posted an impressive 25-6 mark and had the nation's leading scorer on the roster, Dave Skalko. When Heyliger retired in 1974, turning the team over to John Matchefts, the success continued with two more 20+ win seasons in three years. By the time the 1980 rolled around, however, the team's on-ice results began to flag and after a pair of disappointing, single-digit-win seasons Matchefts pushed his team to a .500-record before turning control over to the program's all-time leading scorer. Chuck Delich led the program for the 12 seasons, posting moderate results for most of his tenure, but as the 20th century drew to a close, the Falcons' days as a plucky Independent were numbered.

=== CHA ===
In 1997, former Denver head coach Frank Serratore was hired to replace Delich and recorded two 15-win seasons before everything changed for the Falcons. In 1999, Air Force became a founding member of the CHA, joining with the other service academy Army and five other newly-minted Division I teams. Despite the other programs having little history of success, Air Force was unable to make much headway in the conference, with the best finish being 4th out of 7 teams in their inaugural year. Army left the conference after only one year, leaving the conference with only six programs, and the Falcons found themselves as one of the worst. Air Force finished in 5th- or 6th-place for four consecutive seasons and threw in a pair of 4th-place marks for good measure. Despite their regular season woes, the Falcons did achieve some success in the CHA tournament, reaching the semifinals three times despite being an underdog. By 2006, however, it became apparent that the men's side of CHA (which had added a women's division in 2002) was in trouble. The Falcons left the CHA and were accepted into the Atlantic Hockey Association, rejoining Army in the same conference.

=== Atlantic Hockey Association ===
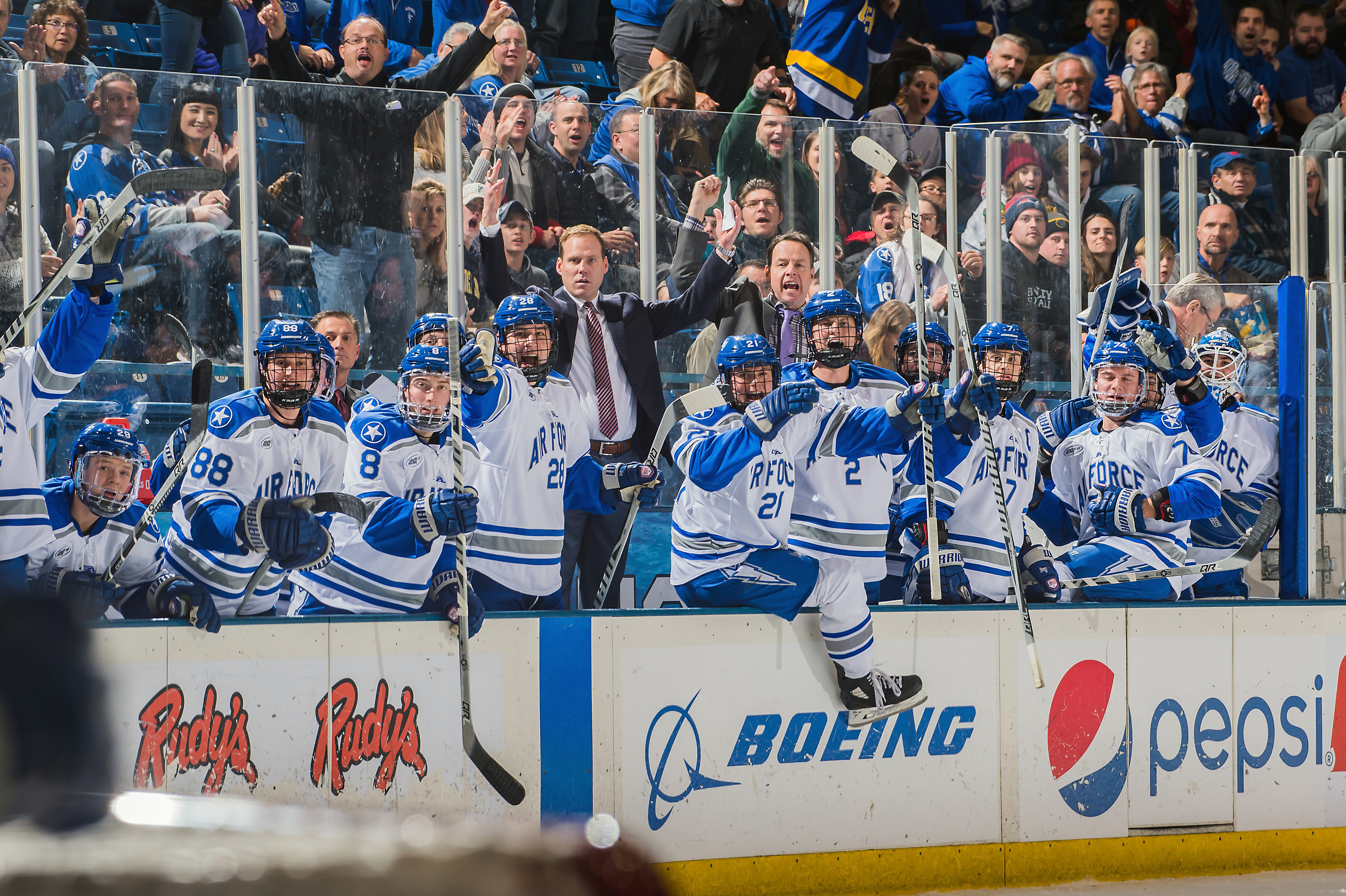
The Falcons bench celebrates a goal during a game in 2018

The change seemed to suit the Falcons, who posted their first winning season in 7 years. In the conference tournament, Air Force defeated Holy Cross 3-0 before stunning #1 seeded Sacred Heart 5-4 in overtime. In the championship match, the Falcons took on Army and routed the Black Knights 6-1 to win the program's first conference championship and receive their first bid into the NCAA tournament. Though they lost to Minnesota in the opening round, the success would continue for the next two years with two additional Atlantic Hockey tournament titles and culminated with a 28-win season in 2009 where they won their first regular season conference title and NCAA tournament game. After a middling season in 2010, the Falcons posted back-to-back conference championships but failed to escape the first round in either season. Air Force spent the mid-teens rebuilding their program, and it came to a head in 2017 with their sixth Atlantic Hockey crown. The Falcons played so well over the course of the season that there was some talk of them making the NCAA tournament even if they were to lose the Atlantic Hockey championship (an exceedingly rare occurrence for Atlantic Hockey Teams). Their second quarterfinal appearance was followed by another in 2018, where they were outplayed by eventual champion Minnesota–Duluth until the final period.

=== Atlantic Hockey America ===
After the 2023–24 season, the Atlantic Hockey Association merged with CHA, which had become a women-only league after the 2009–10 season. The two conferences had shared a commissioner and office staff since 2010. The new league was unveiled on April 30, 2024 as Atlantic Hockey America, maintaining the Association's AHA initialism. All members of both predecessor leagues were brought into the new conference.

== Season-by-season results ==
=== All-time coaching records ===
As of the end of the 2025–26 season

Tenure	Coach	Years	Record	Pct.
1968–1974	Vic Heyliger	6	85–77–3	.524
1974–1985	John Matchefts	11	154–150–6	.506
1985–1997	Chuck Delich	12	154–197–19	.442
1997–Present	Frank Serratore	29	490–472–106	.508
Totals	4 coaches	57 seasons	883–896–134	.497

== Awards and honors ==
=== U.S. Hockey Hall of Fame ===
The following individuals have been inducted into the United States Hockey Hall of Fame.

- Vic Heyliger (1974)
- John Matchefts (1991)

=== NCAA ===
==== Scoring Champion ====
- Dave Skalko (1972)

==== Lowes' Senior CLASS Award ====
- Jacques Lamoureux (2011)
- Kyle Haak (2019)

==== Derek Hines Unsung Hero Award ====
- Mike Phillipich (2009)
- Dylan Abood (2018)

==== All-Americans ====
AHCA Second Team All-Americans

- Eric Ehn (2007)
- Jacques Lamoureux (2009)
- Tim Kirby (2012)

=== College Hockey America ===
==== Individual awards ====
Player of the Year

- Marc Kielkucki (2001)

Rookie of the Year

- Andy Berg (2000)

Student-Athlete of the Year

- Scott Bradley (2001)
- Brian Gornick (2002)
- Mike Polidor (2004)

==== All-Conference teams ====
First Team All-CHA

- Marc Kielkucki (2001)
- Brian Gornick (2001)
- Derek Olson (2002)

Second Team All-CHA

- Brian Gornick (2000)
- Andy Berg (2001, 2003)
- Brian Gineo (2005)
- Michael Mayra (2006)
- Eric Ehn (2006)

All-CHA Rookie Team

- Andy Berg (2000)
- Joe Locallo (2001)
- Zach Sikich (2002)
- Matt Charbonneau (2005)
- Eric Ehn (2005)
- Michael Mayra (2006)

=== Atlantic Hockey Association ===
==== Individual awards ====
Player of the Year

- Eric Ehn (2007)
- Jacques Lamoureux (2009)

Best Defensive Forward

- Brady Tomlak (2020)
- Austin Schwartz (2024)

Best Defenseman

- Gregg Flynn (2009)
- Tim Kirby (2012)
- Adam McKenzie (2013)
- Ben Carey (2016)

Scoring Champion

- Eric Ehn (2007)
- Jacques Lamoureux (2009)
- Tim Kirby (2012)

Regular Season Goaltending Award

- Shane Starett (2016)
- Billy Christopoulos (2018, 2019)

Individual Sportsmanship Award

- Jason Fabian (2014)
- Ben Carey(2016)

Coach of the Year

- Frank Serratore (2016)

Tournament MVP

- Mike Phillipich (2007)
- Brent Olson (2008)
- Matt Fairchild (2009)
- Jacques Lamoureux (2011)
- Jason Torf (2012)
- Shane Starrett (2017)
- Billy Christopoulos (2018)

==== All-Conference teams ====
First Team All-Atlantic Hockey

- 2006–07: Eric Ehn, F
- 2008–09: Andrew Volkening, G; Greg Flynn, D; Jacques Lamoureux, F
- 2009–10: Tim Kirby, D; Jacques Lamoureux, F
- 2010–11: Scott Mathis, F
- 2011–12: Tim Kirby, D; Scott Mathis, F; Kyle De Laurell, F
- 2012–13: Adam McKenzie, D; Kyle De Laurell, F
- 2015–16: Shane Starrett, G
- 2016–17: Phil Boje, D
- 2018–19: Billy Christopoulos, G
- 2023–24: Will Gavin, F

Second Team All-Atlantic Hockey

- 2006–07: Andrew Ramsey, F
- 2007–08: Greg Flynn, D
- 2009–10: Andrew Volkening, G
- 2010–11: Jacques Lamoureux, F
- 2011–12: John Kruse, F
- 2013–14: Adam McKenzie, D; Cole Gunner, F
- 2014–15: Cole Gunner, F
- 2015–16: Johnny Hrabovsky, D
- 2016–17: Jordan Himley, F
- 2022–23: Luke Rowe, D
- 2023–24: Chris Hedden, F

Third Team All-Atlantic Hockey

- 2007–08: Eric Ehn, F
- 2010–11: Tim Kirby, D
- 2016–17: Shane Starrett, G
- 2019–20: Brandon Koch, D
- 2021–22: Brandon Koch, D
- 2023–24: Luke Rowe, D

All-Atlantic Hockey Rookie Team

- 2008–09: Scott Mathis, D
- 2010–11: Jason Torf, G; Adam McKenzie, D
- 2013–14: Chris Truehl, G
- 2015–16: Shane Starrett, G; Matt Serratore, F
- 2019–20: Brandon Koch, D
- 2021–22: Mitchell Digby, D; Clayton Cosentino, F
- 2022–23: Chris Hedden, D

=== Atlantic Hockey America ===
==== Individual awards ====
Best Defenseman

- Chris Hedden (2026)

Best Defensive Forward

- Austin Schwartz (2025)

==== All-Conference teams ====
First Team All-Atlantic Hockey America

- 2025–26: Chris Hedden, D

Third Team All-Atlantic Hockey America

- 2025–26: Dominik Wasik, G; Nolan Cunningham, D

== Statistical leaders ==
=== Career Scoring leaders ===
GP = Games played; G = Goals; A = Assists; Pts = Points; PIM = Penalty minutes

Player	Years	GP	G	A	Pts	PIM
Chuck Delich	1973–1977	109	156	123	279	151
Bob Sajevic	1976–1980	113	107	121	228	54
Dave Skalko	1969–1973	118	75	144	219	208
Bob Ross	1968–1972	106	105	92	197	41
Gary Batinich	1974–1978	104	82	114	196	107
Tom Richards	1978–1982	118	78	90	168	54
Mike Smellie	1976–1980	103	77	89	166	56
Frank Daldine	1983–1986	109	79	77	156	75
Dave Bunker	1970–1974	109	82	70	152	118
Robin Robideaux	1975–1979	108	68	84	152	200

=== Career Goaltending Leaders ===
GP = Games played; Min = Minutes played; GA = Goals against; SO = Shutouts; SV% = Save percentage; GAA = Goals against average

Minimum 35 games

Player	Years	GP	Min	GA	SO	SV%	GAA
Shane Starrett	2015–17	70	3918	128	9	.924	1.96
Andrew Volkening	2006–10	127	7370	269	15	.915	2.19
Stephen Caple	2009–12	36	1792	66	2	.908	2.21
Jason Torf	2010–14	115	6561	269	10	.915	2.46
Chris Truehl	2013–15	50	2745	124	3	.900	2.71

Statistics current through the start of the 2017-18 season.

== Current roster ==
As of August 12, 2025.

No.	Nat.	Player	Class	Pos	Height	Weight	DoB	Hometown	Previous team	NHL rights
2	(United States)	Beau Janzig	Sophomore	D	6' 2" (1.88 m)	201 lb (91 kg)	2003-11-17	Hermantown, Minnesota	Minnesota Wilderness (NAHL)	—
3	(United States)	Rem Morque	Sophomore	D	6' 1" (1.85 m)	190 lb (86 kg)	2003-11-12	Grand Rapids, Minnesota	Minnesota Wilderness (NAHL)	—
4	(United States)	Will Jones	Sophomore	D	5' 9" (1.75 m)	170 lb (77 kg)	2004-03-09	Brentwood, Tennessee	Powell River Kings (BCHL)	—
6	(United States)	Simon Houge	Freshman	F	5' 7" (1.7 m)	172 lb (78 kg)	2004-09-24	Woodbury, Minnesota	West Kelowna Warriors (BCHL)	—
7	(United States)	Jake Peterson	Sophomore	D	6' 2" (1.88 m)	190 lb (86 kg)	2003-10-02	Rosemount, Minnesota	Bismarck Bobcats (NAHL)	—
8	(United States)	Cole Christian	Freshman	F	5' 8" (1.73 m)	154 lb (70 kg)	2004-06-21	Duluth, Minnesota	Anchorage Wolverines (NAHL)	—
9	(United States)	Anthony Yu	Sophomore	F	5' 9" (1.75 m)	181 lb (82 kg)	2004-07-10	Baldwin Park, California	Powell River Kings (BCHL)	—
10	(United States)	Oliver Genest	Freshman	F	6' 1" (1.85 m)	194 lb (88 kg)	2004-03-19	Sanford, Maine	New Hampshire Mountain Kings (NAHL)	—
11	(United States)	Sam Jacobs	Junior	F	6' 0" (1.83 m)	185 lb (84 kg)	2003-04-25	Plymouth, Minnesota	Wisconsin Windigo (NAHL)	—
12	(United States)	Cade Moxham	Freshman	F	6' 2" (1.88 m)	201 lb (91 kg)	2004-03-09	Calgary, Alberta	Aberdeen Wings (NAHL)	—
13	(United States)	Mason McCormick	Senior	F	6' 4" (1.93 m)	205 lb (93 kg)	2001-05-25	Verona, Wisconsin	Waterloo Black Hawks (USHL)	—
14	(United States)	Will Dawson	Sophomore	F	6' 0" (1.83 m)	183 lb (83 kg)	2003-10-03	Traverse City, Michigan	Minot Minotauros (NAHL)	—
15	(United States)	Owen Dubois	Junior	F	6' 4" (1.93 m)	200 lb (91 kg)	2002-07-06	Madison, Wisconsin	Aberdeen Wings (NAHL)	—
18	(United States)	Holt Oliphant	Senior	F	5' 10" (1.78 m)	190 lb (86 kg)	2001-05-17	Northbrook, Illinois	Johnstown Tomahawks (NAHL)	—
19	(United States)	Calvin Beard	Freshman	D	6' 2" (1.88 m)	179 lb (81 kg)	2005-10-04	Southborough, Massachusetts	Powell River Kings (BCHL)	—
20	(United States)	Nolan Cunningham	Junior	D	6' 2" (1.88 m)	185 lb (84 kg)	2001-12-17	Helena, Montana	Fairbanks Ice Dogs (NAHL)	—
21	(United States)	Hayden Nichol	Freshman	F	6' 1" (1.85 m)	190 lb (86 kg)	2003-06-30	Rochester, New York	Shreveport Mudbugs (NAHL)	—
22	(United States)	Chris Hedden	Senior	D	6' 0" (1.83 m)	185 lb (84 kg)	2002-09-20	Kalamazoo, Michigan	Omaha Lancers (USHL)	—
23	(United States)	Nick Sajevic	Sophomore	F	5' 11" (1.8 m)	174 lb (79 kg)	2003-01-15	Shoreview, Minnesota	Janesville Jets (NAHL)	—
26	(United States)	Michael Kadlecik	Sophomore	F	6' 0" (1.83 m)	170 lb (77 kg)	2004-04-14	Lansing, New York	Odessa Jackalopes (NAHL)	—
27	(United States)	Samuel Stitz	Sophomore	F	6' 1" (1.85 m)	200 lb (91 kg)	2003-06-18	Perry Hall, Maryland	Maryland Black Bears (NAHL)	—
30	(United States)	Dominik Wasik	Junior	G	6' 1" (1.85 m)	165 lb (75 kg)	2002-07-02	Superior, Wisconsin	Steinbach Pistons (MJHL)	—
33	(United States)	Zane Spaniol	Freshman	G	6' 3" (1.91 m)	185 lb (84 kg)	2004-09-29	Ham Lake, Minnesota	Minnesota Mallards (NAHL)	—
35	(United States)	Carter Clafton	Junior	G	6' 2" (1.88 m)	175 lb (79 kg)	2002-03-13	Grand Rapids, Minnesota	Amarillo Wranglers (NAHL)	—
37	(United States)	Toby Hopp	Sophomore	G	6' 1" (1.85 m)	185 lb (84 kg)	2004-06-27	Maple Grove, Minnesota	Northeast Generals (NAHL)	—
39	(United States)	Dylan Krick	Freshman	G	6' 2" (1.88 m)	146 lb (66 kg)	2005-06-19	West Chester, Pennsylvania	Cowichan Valley Capitals (BCHL)	—
44	(United States)	Will Staring	Sophomore	D	6' 2" (1.88 m)	195 lb (88 kg)	2003-02-28	Springfield, Virginia	Dubuque Fighting Saints (USHL)	—
48	(United States)	Nick Remissong	Junior	F	6' 0" (1.83 m)	185 lb (84 kg)	2002-05-19	Lake Forest, Illinois	Trail Smoke Eaters (BCHL)	—
58	(United States)	Nate Farrell	Freshman	D	6' 0" (1.83 m)	185 lb (84 kg)	2004-02-09	Wheaton, Illinois	Wisconsin Windigo (NAHL)	—
64	(United States)	Brendan Gibbons	Sophomore	F	6' 2" (1.88 m)	205 lb (93 kg)	2002-06-15	South Kingstown, Rhode Island	Maine Nordiques (NAHL)	—
72	(United States)	Aidan Willis	Freshman	F	5' 11" (1.8 m)	185 lb (84 kg)	2005-01-11	Farmington, Minnesota	Salmon Arm Silverbacks (BCHL)	—
81	(United States)	Charles Panchisin	Freshman	F	5' 10" (1.78 m)	174 lb (79 kg)	2004-11-15	Lincolnshire, Illinois	Philadelphia Rebels (NAHL)	—

== Falcons in the NHL ==
Goalie Shane Starrett signed an Entry Level Contract with the Edmonton Oilers of the NHL on April 10, 2017. He is currently the only Air Force Falcons Men's Ice Hockey player to be in the NHL or respected affiliates.
