= 2024–25 American International Yellow Jackets men's ice hockey season =

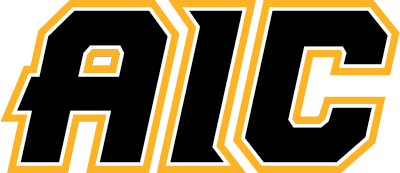
- Conference: 8th AHA
- Home ice: MassMutual Center

Rankings
- USCHO: NR
- USA Hockey: NR

Record
- Overall: 13–23–2
- Conference: 9–16–1
- Home: 6–8–0
- Road: 6–15–2
- Neutral: 1–0–0

Coaches and captains
- Head coach: Eric Lang
- Assistant coaches: Matthew Woodward; Brendan Riley; Nielsson Arcibal
- Captain(s): Casey McDonald; Evan Stella

The 2024–25 American International Yellow Jackets men's ice hockey season was the 77th season of play for the program, the 27th at the Division I level and 1st in the Atlantic Hockey America conference. The Yellow Jackets represented American International College, played their home games at MassMutual Center and were coached by Eric Lang in his 9th season.

== Season ==
At the start of the season, seemingly the biggest issue the program had to figuring out who would be the team's starting goaltender. While neither Chase Clark nor Peyton Grainer seemed able to take hold of the reins through the first month of the season, the difficult schedule the team had to content with was at least partly to blame. AIC was able to win just twice in its first nine games but most of their opponents during that stretch would end the season as nationally ranked teams. Despite their poor record, the team had high hopes for their prospects in conference play but the program was able to receive some of the worst news imaginable.

In mid-November, American International College announced that it would be reclassifying its ice hockey team as a Division II program for the following year. The Yellow Jackets were a D-II school for most of their teams; however, the school had taken advantage of an NCAA rule that allowed them to promote one sport to a higher tier, similar to the RIT Tigers and Clarkson Golden Knights. AIC has had some of the lowest attendance numbers in college hockey, routinely drawing fewer than 500 people in a building that could seat more than 6,800. American International's primary conference, Northeast-10, is the only league that sponsors Division II ice hockey, so the immediate expectation is that the Yellow Jackets will join that conference as soon as possible.

The announcement was a gut-punch to the team who had to continue knowing that many players were spending their final months at the school. Unsurprisingly, the team had to fight through inconsistent play as they finished off the first half of its season, however, AIC ended up in a very unfortunate position at the beginning of December. After dropping the first game of the weekend to Holy Cross, the Yellow Jackets were forced to cancel the rematch when all three of the team's goaltenders were unable to compete due to injury. While the initial plan was to just have the game not played, eventually it was rescheduled for the end of the regular season. Fortunately, the team was set to go on the winter break immediately after the match so no other games were impacted.

Not much changed for the club when they began the second half. Both the offense and defense had good and bad moments but only occasionally were they able to align to provide the team with a win. Clark ended up commanding the bulk of the minutes in goal but still gave way to Grainer or Adam Manji from time to time. AIC played poorly to end the campaign but did earn just enough points in the standings to merit a home game in the first round of the conference playoff. However, as if to add insult to injury, the team was unable to use the MassMutual Center and were forced to borrow the Tate Rink from Army. The slight seemed to wake the team up and the Yellow Jackets fought hard in their final D-I postseason run. The team Clark starred in the neutral site match against RIT, making 31 saves and forced overtime. While the Tigers collected the first four shots in the extra session, team captain Casey McDonald extended the program's season with just his second goal of the year.

The reward for the victory was a quarterfinal showdown with Holy Cross, the regular season champion. AIC showed no fear against the Crusaders and built a 3–0 lead in the through the first two periods. Holy Cross managed to get two goals past Clark in the third but the Yellow Jackets were able to carry the day. The rematch began with CHC scoring twice on special teams before American International replied with two markers to tie the match. A goal by the home team late in the third proved to be the game-winner and evened the series at 1-all. In the rubber match, AIC had to come from behind on three separate occasions, using the power-play to their advantage twice. The final time, Lauri Sertti scored his first of the year with just 35 seconds left in regulation. At the time, Clark was on the bench to give the club a 6-on-4 opportunity. Despite the huge boost to the team's morale, they were unable to carry any momentum into overtime and the first shot eluded Clark. The loss ended the team's season as well as their time at the top level of college hockey.

== Departures ==
Player	Position	Nationality	Cause
Alexandros Aslanidis	Goaltender	United States	Graduate transfer to Lindenwood
Brett Callahan	Defenseman	United States	Graduation (retired)
Grayson Dietrich	Forward	United States	Transferred to Niagara
Cole Hudson	Goaltender	United States	Transferred to Brockport State
Julius Janhonen	Forward	Finland	Graduation (signed with HPK)
Logan Jenuwine	Forward	United States	Graduation (retired)
Brian Kramer	Defenseman	United States	Graduate transfer to Western Michigan
Darwin Lakoduk	Forward	Canada	Graduation (retired)
Tomi Leppänen	Defenseman	Finland	Signed professional contract (Iisalmen Peli-Karhut)
Austen Long	Forward	United States	Graduation (signed with Fayetteville Marksmen)
Dustin Manz	Forward	United States	Graduation (signed with Wheeling Nailers)
Akseli Pennanen	Forward	Finland	Signed professional contract (TUTO Hockey)
Matthew Rickard	Defenseman	United States	Graduate transfer to Alaska
Jake Sacratini	Forward	United States	Transferred to Plattsburgh State
Casper Söderling	Defenseman	Sweden	Transferred to Curry
Nico Somerville	Defenseman	Canada	Graduation (signed with Wichita Thunder)
Nils Wallström	Goaltender	Sweden	Transferred to Merrimack
Blake Wells	Forward	Canada	Graduation (signed with Utah Grizzlies)

== Recruiting ==
Player	Position	Nationality	Age	Notes
Brett Bamber	Defenseman	Canada	23	St. Albert, AB; transfer from Alaska Anchorage
Chase Clark	Goaltender	United States	22	Williamsville, NY; transfer from Sacred Heart; drafted 183rd overall in 2021
Blake Dangos	Defenseman	United States	22	St. Louis, MO; transfer from Sacred Heart
Wilhelm Forsberg	Forward	Sweden	20	Sollentuna, SWE
Tobias Bjercke Larsen	Defenseman	Norway	20	Oslo, NOR
Adam Manji	Goaltender	Canada	21	New Westminster, BC
Justin Mexico	Forward	United States	20	Madison Heights, MI
David Posma	Defenseman	United States	21	Pomona, NY
Tyler Procious	Defenseman	United States	21	Pittsford, NY
Noah Serdachny	Forward	Canada	21	Edmonton, AB; transfer from Colorado College
Nikolai Tishkevich	Forward	Belarus	20	Minsk, BLR
Nicky Wallace	Defenseman	United States	21	Atlantic Highlands, NJ; transfer from Quinnipiac
Danny Weight	Forward	Canada	23	Edmonton, AB; graduate transfer from Colorado College
Tanner Willick	Defenseman	Canada	20	Saskatoon, SK

== Roster ==
As of July 29, 2024.

No.	Nat.	Player	Class	Pos	Height	Weight	DoB	Hometown	Previous team	NHL rights
1	(Canada)	Adam Manji	Freshman	G	6' 5" (1.96 m)	181 lb (82 kg)	2003-07-10	New Westminster, British Columbia	Coquitlam Express (BCHL)	—
2	(United States)	Tyler Procious	Freshman	D	5' 10" (1.78 m)	165 lb (75 kg)	2003-05-29	Pittsford, New York	Rochester Jr. Americans (NAHL)	—
3	(Canada)	Tanner Willick	Freshman	D	5' 9" (1.75 m)	157 lb (71 kg)	2003-12-20	Saskatoon, Saskatchewan	Blackfalds Bulldogs (BCHL)	—
4	(United States)	Blake Dangos	Junior	D	5' 10" (1.78 m)	174 lb (79 kg)	2002-04-08	St. Louis, Missouri	Sacred Heart (AHA)	—
6	(Norway)	Tobias Bjercke Larsen	Freshman	D	6' 2" (1.88 m)	207 lb (94 kg)	2004-08-27	Oslo, Norway	Färjestad BK J20 (J20 Nationell)	—
7	(United States)	Danny Weight	Graduate	F	6' 0" (1.83 m)	185 lb (84 kg)	2001-05-01	Lattingtown, New York	Colorado College (NCHC)	—
8	(Canada)	Brett Bamber	Junior	D	5' 9" (1.75 m)	175 lb (79 kg)	2001-11-07	St. Albert, Alberta	Alaska Anchorage (NCAA)	—
9	(United States)	Hunter Longhi	Sophomore	F	5' 8" (1.73 m)	174 lb (79 kg)	2002-04-02	Collinsville, Illinois	Minot Minotauros (NAHL)	—
10	(Belarus)	Nikolai Tishkevich	Freshman	F	5' 11" (1.8 m)	185 lb (84 kg)	2004-01-09	Minsk, Belarus	Aberdeen Wings (NAHL)	—
11	(United States)	Justin Mexico	Freshman	F	5' 10" (1.78 m)	165 lb (75 kg)	2003-12-05	Madison Heights, Michigan	Lincoln Stars (USHL)	—
12	(United States)	David Posma	Junior	D	6' 0" (1.83 m)	170 lb (77 kg)	2003-08-27	Pomona, New York	Niagara (AHA)	—
13	(United States)	Hunter Jones	Sophomore	F	5' 10" (1.78 m)	190 lb (86 kg)	2002-07-13	Andover, Minnesota	Oklahoma Warriors (NAHL)	—
14	(Sweden)	Douglas Andersson	Sophomore	F	6' 6" (1.98 m)	209 lb (95 kg)	2002-04-04	Ängelholm, Sweden	Kallinge-Ronneby IF (Hockeyettan)	—
15	(United States)	Nicky Wallace	Sophomore	D	5' 8" (1.73 m)	165 lb (75 kg)	2003-05-07	Atlantic Highlands, New Jersey	Quinnipiac (ECAC)	—
16	(Canada)	Andrew Amousse	Sophomore	F	6' 3" (1.91 m)	215 lb (98 kg)	2001-07-16	Laval, Quebec	Victoria Grizzlies (BCHL)	—
17	(Sweden)	Oscar Geschwind	Senior	F	6' 0" (1.83 m)	195 lb (88 kg)	2001-02-24	Hällefors, Sweden	Northern Michigan (CCHA)	—
19	(Canada)	Jordan Biro	Graduate	F	5' 8" (1.73 m)	160 lb (73 kg)	2000-08-10	Sherwood Park, Alberta	Colorado College (NCHC)	—
21	(United States)	John Lundy	Junior	F	5' 9" (1.75 m)	163 lb (74 kg)	2001-04-27	Brooklyn, New York	Jamestown Rebels (NAHL)	—
22	(Russia)	Timofei Khokhlachev	Junior	F	6' 4" (1.93 m)	220 lb (100 kg)	2001-11-06	Moscow, Russia	Shreveport Mudbugs (NAHL)	—
23	(Sweden)	Theo Angesved	Sophomore	D	5' 11" (1.8 m)	172 lb (78 kg)	2003-06-23	Växjö, Sweden	Borås HC (Hockeyettan)	—
24	(Sweden)	Wilhelm Forsberg	Freshman	F	6' 3" (1.91 m)	190 lb (86 kg)	2004-04-26	Sollentuna, Sweden	Djurgårdens IF J20 (J20 Nationell)	—
25	(Sweden)	Alexander Malinowski	Junior	F	5' 11" (1.8 m)	185 lb (84 kg)	2001-02-07	Linköping, Sweden	Fairbanks Ice Dogs (NAHL)	—
26	(United States)	Hunter McCurdy	Junior	D	6' 1" (1.85 m)	220 lb (100 kg)	2001-08-09	Mokena, Illinois	Danbury Jr. Hat Tricks (NAHL)	—
27	(Canada)	Josh Barnes	Junior	F	5' 10" (1.78 m)	175 lb (79 kg)	2002-09-27	Cornwall, Ontario	Des Moines Buccaneers (USHL)	—
28	(Sweden)	Alfred Lindberg	Sophomore	F	5' 11" (1.8 m)	185 lb (84 kg)	2002-01-28	Hallsberg, Sweden	New Mexico Ice Wolves (NAHL)	—
29	(Canada)	Noah Serdachny	Junior	F	6' 1" (1.85 m)	190 lb (86 kg)	2003-03-09	Edmonton, Alberta	Colorado College (NCHC)	—
33	(United States)	Peyton Grainer	Sophomore	G	6' 1" (1.85 m)	179 lb (81 kg)	2002-03-12	Detroit, Michigan	Jersey Hitmen (NCDC)	—
34	(United States)	Chase Clark	Junior	G	6' 6" (1.98 m)	208 lb (94 kg)	2002-04-08	Williamsville, New York	Sacred Heart (AHA)	WSH, 183rd overall 2021
37	(Sweden)	Evan Stella (C)	Senior	D	5' 11" (1.8 m)	180 lb (82 kg)	2001-05-11	Karlstad, Sweden	Dubuque Fighting Saints (USHL)	—
39	(Canada)	Dario Beljo	Sophomore	F	6' 3" (1.91 m)	190 lb (86 kg)	2002-08-15	Greater Sudbury, Ontario	Brooks Bandits (AJHL)	—
55	(Canada)	Brett Rylance	Junior	F	5' 9" (1.75 m)	167 lb (76 kg)	2001-08-03	Edmonton, Alberta	Chilliwack Chiefs (BCHL)	—
61	(Canada)	Casey McDonald (C)	Junior	F	6' 1" (1.85 m)	187 lb (85 kg)	2001-05-10	Plenty, Saskatchewan	Penticton Vees (BCHL)	—

== Standings ==
2024–25 Atlantic Hockey America Standings
	Conference record										Overall record					
	GP	W	L	T	OW	OL	SW	PTS	GF	GA	GP	W	L	T	GF	GA
Holy Cross †	26	19	5	2	4	0	1	56	92	47	40	24	14	2	130	94
Sacred Heart	26	16	7	3	1	1	2	53	80	64	39	21	13	5	118	101
#19 Bentley *	26	16	9	1	1	2	1	51	79	57	40	23	15	2	115	83
Niagara	26	15	9	2	3	3	1	48	90	70	37	18	16	3	124	109
Army	26	14	10	2	2	0	2	44	84	74	38	16	20	2	105	117
Canisius	26	11	13	2	0	3	0	38	84	79	37	12	23	2	98	120
Air Force	26	11	13	2	2	3	1	37	59	58	40	16	21	3	86	112
American International	26	9	16	1	0	3	0	31	63	77	38	13	23	2	92	117
RIT	26	9	15	2	2	0	1	28	65	102	35	10	23	2	82	133
Robert Morris	26	7	15	4	1	2	1	27	72	86	35	10	20	5	95	115
Mercyhurst	26	4	19	3	1	0	2	16	59	113	35	4	27	4	77	150
Championship: March 22, 2025 † indicates conference regular season champion (DeGregorio Trophy) * indicates conference tournament champion (Riley Trophy); Rankings: USCHO.com Top 20 Poll

== Schedule and results ==
Date	Time	Opponent^{#}	Rank^{#}	Site	TV	Decision	Result	Attendance	Record
Regular Season
October 5	7:00 pm	at #12 Maine*		Alfond Arena • Orono, Maine	ESPN+	Clark	L 0–6	5,043	0–1–0
October 11	7:00 pm	at Ohio State*		Value City Arena • Columbus, Ohio		Clark	T 3–3 ^{OT}	2,623	0–1–1
October 12	5:00 pm	at Ohio State*		Value City Arena • Columbus, Ohio		Grainer	L 2–5	2,464	0–2–1
October 18	7:00 pm	at #2 Boston College*		Conte Forum • Chestnut Hill, Massachusetts	ESPN+	Grainer	L 0–5	7,224	0–3–1
October 25	1:00 pm	Air Force		MassMutual Center • Springfield, Massachusetts	FloHockey	Clark	L 1–2	212	0–4–1 (0–1–0)
October 26	1:00 pm	Air Force		MassMutual Center • Springfield, Massachusetts	FloHockey	Clark	W 4–2	238	1–4–1 (1–1–0)
November 2	1:00 pm	#17 Massachusetts*		MassMutual Center • Springfield, Massachusetts	FloHockey	Clark	L 3–4	678	1–5–1
November 7	7:00 pm	at Holy Cross		Hart Center • Worcester, Massachusetts	FloHockey	Grainer	L 2–5	661	1–6–1 (1–2–0)
November 8	7:00 pm	at Holy Cross		Hart Center • Worcester, Massachusetts	FloHockey, NESN+	Manji	W 3–2	814	2–6–1 (2–2–0)
November 15	7:00 pm	at Bentley		Bentley Arena • Waltham, Massachusetts	FloHockey	Grainer	L 2–5	1,050	2–7–1 (2–3–0)
November 16	6:00 pm	at Bentley		Bentley Arena • Waltham, Massachusetts	FloHockey	Grainer	L 0–3	850	2–8–1 (2–4–0)
November 19	7:00 pm	at Stonehill*		Bridgewater Ice Arena • Bridgewater, Massachusetts	NEC Front Row	Grainer	W 3–0	76	3–8–1
November 23	1:00 pm	Niagara		MassMutual Center • Springfield, Massachusetts	FloHockey	Grainer	L 1–2	—	3–9–1 (2–5–0)
November 24	3:00 pm	Niagara		MassMutual Center • Springfield, Massachusetts	FloHockey	Manji	W 5–2	259	4–9–1 (3–5–0)
November 29	5:00 pm	at Robert Morris		Clearview Arena • Moon Township, Pennsylvania	FloHockey	Clark	L 1–4	652	4–10–1 (3–6–0)
November 30	5:00 pm	at Robert Morris		Clearview Arena • Moon Township, Pennsylvania	FloHockey	Clark	W 4–2	787	5–10–1 (4–6–0)
December 6	1:00 pm	Holy Cross		MassMutual Center • Springfield, Massachusetts	FloHockey	Clark	L 0–1 ^{OT}	362	5–11–1 (4–7–0)
December 28	1:00 pm	Sacred Heart		MassMutual Center • Springfield, Massachusetts	FloHockey	Clark	L 1–4	187	5–12–1 (4–8–0)
December 29	4:00 pm	at #18 Quinnipiac*		M&T Bank Arena • Hamden, Connecticut	ESPN+	Clark	L 5–6	3,111	5–13–1
January 3	7:00 pm	at Stonehill*		Bridgewater Ice Arena • Bridgewater, Massachusetts	NEC Front Row	Grainer	W 3–1	107	6–13–1
January 7	7:00 pm	Army		MassMutual Center • Springfield, Massachusetts	FloHockey	Clark	W 8–2	357	7–13–1 (5–8–0)
January 17	7:00 pm	at Sacred Heart		Martire Family Arena • Fairfield, Connecticut	FloHockey	Clark	L 2–5	2,566	7–14–1 (5–9–0)
January 18	7:00 pm	at Sacred Heart		Martire Family Arena • Fairfield, Connecticut	FloHockey	Clark	L 3–6	3,112	7–15–1 (5–10–0)
January 21	7:00 pm	Bentley		MassMutual Center • Springfield, Massachusetts	FloHockey	Grainer	L 1–6	258	7–16–1 (5–11–0)
January 24	1:00 pm	Canisius		MassMutual Center • Springfield, Massachusetts	FloHockey	Clark	L 2–4	108	7–17–1 (5–12–0)
January 25	5:00 pm	Canisius		MassMutual Center • Springfield, Massachusetts	FloHockey	Clark	W 3–2	287	8–17–1 (6–12–0)
February 7	7:00 pm	at Mercyhurst		Mercyhurst Ice Center • Erie, Pennsylvania	FloHockey	Clark	W 5–0	1,286	9–17–1 (7–12–0)
February 8	4:00 pm	at Mercyhurst		Mercyhurst Ice Center • Erie, Pennsylvania	FloHockey	Clark	W 4–1	1,307	10–17–1 (8–12–0)
February 14	7:05 pm	at RIT		Gene Polisseni Center • Henrietta, New York	FloHockey	Clark	L 0–3	2,517	10–18–1 (8–13–0)
February 15	7:05 pm	at RIT		Gene Polisseni Center • Henrietta, New York	FloHockey	Clark	T 3–3 ^{SOL}	2,617	10–18–2 (8–13–1)
February 18	7:00 pm	Sacred Heart		MassMutual Center • Springfield, Massachusetts	FloHockey	Grainer	L 2–3	151	10–19–2 (8–14–1)
February 21	7:00 pm	Army		MassMutual Center • Springfield, Massachusetts	FloHockey	Clark	W 3–2	497	11–19–2 (9–14–1)
February 22	4:00 pm	at Army		Tate Rink • West Point, New York	FloHockey	Clark	L 2–3	2,604	11–20–2 (9–15–1)
February 24	7:00 pm	at Holy Cross		Hart Center • Worcester, Massachusetts	FloHockey	Manji	L 1–3	826	11–21–2 (9–16–1)
Atlantic Hockey America Tournament
February 28	6:05 pm	vs. RIT*		Tate Rink • West Point, New York (AHA First Round)	FloHockey	Clark	W 2–1 ^{OT}	171	12–21–2
March 7	7:00 pm	at #20т Holy Cross*		Hart Center • Worcester, Massachusetts (AHA Quarterfinal Game 1)	FloHockey	Clark	W 3–2	614	13–21–2
March 8	7:00 pm	at #20т Holy Cross*		Hart Center • Worcester, Massachusetts (AHA Quarterfinal Game 2)	FloHockey	Clark	L 2–3	678	13–22–2
March 9	5:00 pm	at #20т Holy Cross*		Hart Center • Worcester, Massachusetts (AHA Quarterfinal Game 3)	FloHockey	Clark	L 3–4 ^{OT}	852	13–23–2
*Non-conference game. ^{#}Rankings from USCHO.com Poll. All times are in Eastern Time. Source:

== Scoring statistics ==
Name	Position	Games	Goals	Assists	Points	PIM
Josh Barnes	C	38	14	10	24	6
Dario Beljo	C	30	11	9	20	10
John Lundy	F	37	10	10	20	10
Timofei Khokhlachev	LW	32	8	10	18	50
Brett Bamber	D	35	6	12	18	14
Noah Serdachny	F	37	4	12	16	10
Justin Mexico	F	32	3	12	15	12
Brett Rylance	C/W	35	3	10	13	12
Danny Weight	C	34	5	7	12	37
Oscar Geschwind	C	36	5	7	12	4
Jordan Biro	C	36	3	9	12	6
Alfred Lindberg	C	33	7	4	11	4
David Posma	D	36	2	7	9	51
Alexander Malinowski	LW/RW	25	0	8	8	6
Casey McDonald	F	27	3	4	7	25
Evan Stella	D	35	1	6	7	16
Lauri Sertti	D	37	1	6	7	6
Wilhelm Forsberg	RW	20	1	5	6	6
Tyler Procious	D	32	1	5	6	8
Hunter Longhi	LW	13	2	2	4	4
Blake Dangos	D	33	1	2	3	18
Theo Angesved	D	12	1	1	2	4
Tobias Bjercke Larsen	D	18	0	2	2	10
Adam Manji	G	7	0	1	1	0
Douglas Andersson	LW	8	0	1	1	2
Chase Clark	G	25	0	1	1	5
Joey LoVullo	G	1	0	0	0	0
Nikolai Tishkevich	F	1	0	0	0	0
Nicky Wallace	D	1	0	0	0	0
Hunter McCurdy	D	1	0	0	0	0
Hunter Jones	F	5	0	0	0	0
Tanner Willick	D	7	0	0	0	1
Peyton Grainer	G	12	0	0	0	0
Total			92	162	254	348

== Goaltending statistics ==
Name	Games	Minutes	Wins	Losses	Ties	Goals against	Saves	Shutouts	SV %	GAA
Joey LoVullo	1	1:41	0	0	0	0	0	0	—	0.00
Adam Manji	10	266:20	2	1	0	12	140	0	.921	2.70
Chase Clark	25	1459:01	9	14	2	68	715	1	.913	2.80
Alexandros Aslanidis	14	545:01	2	8	0	29	241	1	.893	3.19
Empty Net	-	29:28	-	-	-	7	-	-	-	-
Total	38	2301:31	13	23	2	116	1096	2	.903	2.73

== Rankings ==
Poll	Week																											
Poll	Pre	1	2	3	4	5	6	7	8	9	10	11	12	13	14	15	16	17	18	19	20	21	22	23	24	25	26	27 (Final)
USCHO.com	NR	NR	NR	NR	NR	NR	NR	NR	NR	NR	NR	NR	–	NR	NR	NR	NR	NR	NR	NR	NR	NR	NR	NR	NR	NR	–	NR
USA Hockey	NR	NR	NR	NR	NR	NR	NR	NR	NR	NR	NR	NR	–	NR	NR	NR	NR	NR	NR	NR	NR	NR	NR	NR	NR	NR	NR	NR

Note: USCHO did not release a poll in week 12 or 26.
Note: USA Hockey did not release a poll in week 12.

== Awards and honors ==
Player	Award	Ref
Evan Stella	All-Atlantic Hockey America Third Team	
