= 2024–25 Robert Morris Colonials men's ice hockey season =

- Conference: 10th AHA
- Home ice: Clearview Arena

Rankings
- USCHO: NR
- USA Hockey: NR

Record
- Overall: 10–20–5
- Conference: 7–15–4
- Home: 4–9–3
- Road: 6–10–2
- Neutral: 0–1–0

Coaches and captains
- Head coach: Derek Schooley
- Assistant coaches: Matt Nicholson; Ryan Durocher
- Captain(s): Michael Craig; Mitch Deelstra; Cameron Garvey

The 2024–25 Robert Morris Colonials men's ice hockey season was the 19th season of play for the program and the 1st in Atlantic Hockey America. The Colonials represented Robert Morris University in the 2024–25 NCAA Division I men's ice hockey season, played their home games at the Clearview Arena and were coached by Derek Schooley in his 19th season.

== Season ==
In its second season back from oblivion, Robert Morris was looking to build back up into a conference contender. Early on, the team looked to suffer a key injury when Dylan Meilun wend down during exhibition play. Coach Schooley settled on Croix Kochendorfer as the starter and the freshman netminder helped the team get off to a fast start. With help from a robust offense, RMU strung together a good stretch in the first month of the season. The Colonials stumbled a bid just before Thanksgiving but they picked up the pace afterwards to finish out the first half of their schedule with a winning record. One of the bright spots was the play of Tanner Klimpke which resulted in him being named as the December Player of the Month by the Hockey Commissioner's Association.

Robert Morris returned from the winter break with an opportunity to show that it could compete against upper-echelon teams in the Desert Hockey Classic. Unfortunately, the Colonials had trouble shaking the rust off after the layoff, particularly on the defensive side. RMU allowed 15 goals in the two games and didn't score a single even-strength marker. The lopsided losses appeared to linger afterwards as the exceedingly young team attempted to soldier on. None of the team's three goaltenders were able to play consistently afterwards. On the rare occasions when RMU allowed less than 3 goals, the offense was too inconsistent to capitalize on several chances. This was due in part to Klimpke's absence from the lineup for over a month. When he returned on February 21, the team had fallen down to 10th in the standings and had won just twice in the final seventeen games.

In their playoff game with Air Force, Klimpke did his best to extend the team's season, scoring twice and adding an assist to force overtime. Kochendorfer, too, was instrumental in the game, making 40 saves in regulation to give his team a chance at victory. Despite playing at altitude, the Colonials appeared to get stronger as the game went on. However, after playing a strong period in the first overtime, RMU began to lose ground to the home side and were called for a penalty in the middle of the second overtime. Just a few seconds after the ensuing faceoff, the winning goal was slammed home into the Colonials' net, ending their season.

== Departures ==
Player	Position	Nationality	Cause
Mitch Andres	Defenseman	United States	Graduation (signed with Fort Wayne Komets)
Matthew Boczar	Forward	United States	Transferred to Endicott
Francis Boisvert	Goaltender	Canada	Graduation (signed with Orlando Solar Bears)
Logan Ganie	Forward	Canada	Graduation (retired)
Cameron Hebert	Forward	Canada	Graduation (retired)
Matt Hutton	Forward	United States	Graduation (retired)
Luke Johnson	Defenseman	United States	Graduation (retired)
Paul Maust	Forward	United States	Graduation (retired)
Charles Merkley	Forward	United States	Transferred to Cortland State
Dominic Schimizzi	Forward	United States	Transferred to Hobart
Michael Sochan	Goaltender	United States	Left program (retired)
Rylee St. Onge	Defenseman	Canada	Graduation (signed with Rapid City Rush)
Cade Townend	Defenseman	Canada	Graduation (signed with Tulsa Oilers)
Dallas Tulik	Forward	United States	Graduation (retired)
Chad Veltri	Goaltender	United States	Graduation (signed with Fort Wayne Komets)

== Recruiting ==
Player	Position	Nationality	Age	Notes
J. R. Ashmead	Defenseman	Canada	21	Calgary, AB
Eric DeDobbelaer	Forward	Canada	24	Hamilton, ON; transfer from Massachusetts
Mitchel Deelstra	Forward	Canada	25	Wallace, ON; graduate transfer from Northern Michigan
Dominic Elliott	Defenseman	United States	20	Allendale, MI
Michael Felsing	Forward	United States	21	Pittsburgh, PA
Connor Gourley	Forward	Canada	20	Calgary, AB
Greg Japchen	Defenseman	United States	22	Doylestown, PA; transfer from Stonehill
Patrick Johnson	Forward	United States	21	Chesterfield, MO
Croix Kochendorfer	Goaltender	United States	20	Saint Paul, MN
Dylan Meilun	Goaltender	Canada	22	Winnipeg, MB; transfer from Stonehill
Cody Monds	Forward	Canada	23	Brockville, ON; transfer from Clarkson
Adam O'Marra	Forward	Canada	21	Mississauga, ON
Braden Rourke	Forward	United States	20	Des Moines, IA
Dawson Smith	Goaltender	Canada	21	Whitehorse, YT; transfer from Western Michigan
Trent Wilson	Forward	Canada	20	Tsawwassen, BC

== Roster ==
As of September 14, 2024.

No.	Nat.	Player	Class	Pos	Height	Weight	DoB	Hometown	Previous team	NHL rights
1	(United States)	Croix Kochendorfer	Freshman	G	6' 4" (1.93 m)	223 lb (101 kg)	2003-10-13	Saint Paul, Minnesota	Aberdeen Wings (NAHL)	—
2	(Canada)	Michael Craig (C)	Sophomore	D	5' 10" (1.78 m)	174 lb (79 kg)	2002-08-26	St. Catharines, Ontario	Nanaimo Clippers (BCHL)	—
3	(United States)	Dominic Elliott	Freshman	D	5' 10" (1.78 m)	176 lb (80 kg)	2004-01-26	Allendale, Michigan	Oklahoma Warriors (NAHL)	—
4	(United States)	Greg Japchen	Junior	D	6' 4" (1.93 m)	205 lb (93 kg)	2001-12-17	Doylestown, Pennsylvania	Stonehill (ECAC)	—
5	(United States)	Luke van Why	Sophomore	D	5' 10" (1.78 m)	163 lb (74 kg)	2003-01-21	Hatfield, Pennsylvania	Maryland Black Bears (NAHL)	—
7	(Canada)	Tom Gangl	Sophomore	D	6' 3" (1.91 m)	201 lb (91 kg)	2002-01-08	Wingham, Ontario	Smiths Falls Bears (CCHL)	—
8	(United States)	Gabriel Lunn	Sophomore	D	6' 0" (1.83 m)	190 lb (86 kg)	2003-08-25	Lockport, New York	Johnstown Tomahawks (NAHL)	—
9	(Canada)	Mitch Deelstra (C)	Graduate	F	6' 0" (1.83 m)	185 lb (84 kg)	1999-07-15	Wallace, Ontario	Northern Michigan (CCHA)	—
10	(Canada)	J. R. Ashmead	Freshman	D	6' 2" (1.88 m)	181 lb (82 kg)	2003-03-23	Calgary, Alberta	Bonnyville Pontiacs (AJHL)	—
11	(Canada)	Eric DeDobbelaer	Junior (RS)	F	5' 10" (1.78 m)	180 lb (82 kg)	2000-06-15	Brantford, Ontario	Massachusetts (HEA)	—
12	(United States)	Jackson Reineke	Sophomore	F	5' 10" (1.78 m)	174 lb (79 kg)	2002-10-03	Faribault, Minnesota	Anchorage Wolverines (USHL)	—
15	(United States)	Connor Gourley	Freshman	F	6' 2" (1.88 m)	170 lb (77 kg)	2004-07-28	Calgary, Alberta	Okotoks Oilers (BCHL)	—
16	(Canada)	George Krotiris	Sophomore	F	5' 11" (1.8 m)	165 lb (75 kg)	2002-08-08	Markham, Ontario	Cobourg Cougars (OJHL)	—
17	(United States)	Patrick Johnson	Freshman	F	5' 8" (1.73 m)	187 lb (85 kg)	2003-06-30	Chesterfield, Missouri	Bismarck Bobcats (NAHL)	—
18	(United States)	Gavin Gulash	Senior (RS)	F	6' 2" (1.88 m)	190 lb (86 kg)	1999-01-11	Red Bank, New Jersey	New Jersey Jr. Titans (NAHL)	—
19	(Canada)	Tanner Klimpke	Sophomore	F	6' 2" (1.88 m)	174 lb (79 kg)	2002-12-13	Calgary, Alberta	Whitecourt Wolverines (AJHL)	—
20	(Canada)	McKay Hayes	Sophomore	F	6' 2" (1.88 m)	205 lb (93 kg)	2002-01-27	Ancaster, Ontario	Markham Royals (OJHL)	—
21	(Canada)	Cameron Garvey (C)	Sophomore	F	6' 0" (1.83 m)	181 lb (82 kg)	2002-12-13	Oakville, Ontario	Collingwood Blues (OJHL)	—
22	(Canada)	Cody Monds	Senior	F	5' 9" (1.75 m)	170 lb (77 kg)	2001-02-09	Brockville, Ontario	Clarkson (ECAC)	—
23	(Canada)	Adam O'Marra	Freshman	F	6' 0" (1.83 m)	183 lb (83 kg)	2003-01-06	Mississauga, Ontario	Trenton Golden Hawks (OJHL)	—
24	(United States)	Walter Zacher	Sophomore	F	5' 11" (1.8 m)	181 lb (82 kg)	2002-04-02	Buffalo, New York	Austin Bruins (NAHL)	—
25	(Canada)	Trevor LeDonne	Senior	D	6' 1" (1.85 m)	192 lb (87 kg)	2000-02-27	Stoney Creek, Ontario	St. Thomas (CCHA)	—
26	(United States)	Braden Rourke	Freshman	F	6' 0" (1.83 m)	172 lb (78 kg)	2004-07-20	Des Moines, Iowa	Des Moines Buccaneers (USHL)	—
27	(Canada)	Trent Wilson	Freshman	F	6' 1" (1.85 m)	187 lb (85 kg)	2004-06-24	Tsawwassen, British Columbia	West Kelowna Warriors (BCHL)	—
29	(United States)	Michael Felsing	Freshman	F	5' 11" (1.8 m)	181 lb (82 kg)	2003-02-11	Pittsburgh, Pennsylvania	Merritt Centennials (BCHL)	—
30	(Canada)	Dawson Smith	Freshman (RS)	G	6' 4" (1.93 m)	195 lb (88 kg)	2003-02-17	Whitehorse, Yukon	Western Michigan (NCHC)	—
31	(Canada)	Dylan Meilun	Junior	G	6' 5" (1.96 m)	220 lb (100 kg)	2001-11-21	Winnipeg, Manitoba	Stonehill (NCAA)	—
33	(Canada)	Lee Chiang	Sophomore	F	5' 9" (1.75 m)	170 lb (77 kg)	2002-12-07	Toronto, Ontario	Markham Royals (OJHL)	—
44	(Canada)	Thomas Haynes	Sophomore	F	6' 2" (1.88 m)	190 lb (86 kg)	2002-02-06	Mississauga, Ontario	Smiths Falls Bears (CCHL)	—

== Standings ==
2024–25 Atlantic Hockey America Standings
	Conference record										Overall record					
	GP	W	L	T	OW	OL	SW	PTS	GF	GA	GP	W	L	T	GF	GA
Holy Cross †	26	19	5	2	4	0	1	56	92	47	40	24	14	2	130	94
Sacred Heart	26	16	7	3	1	1	2	53	80	64	39	21	13	5	118	101
#19 Bentley *	26	16	9	1	1	2	1	51	79	57	40	23	15	2	115	83
Niagara	26	15	9	2	3	3	1	48	90	70	37	18	16	3	124	109
Army	26	14	10	2	2	0	2	44	84	74	38	16	20	2	105	117
Canisius	26	11	13	2	0	3	0	38	84	79	37	12	23	2	98	120
Air Force	26	11	13	2	2	3	1	37	59	58	40	16	21	3	86	112
American International	26	9	16	1	0	3	0	31	63	77	38	13	23	2	92	117
RIT	26	9	15	2	2	0	1	28	65	102	35	10	23	2	82	133
Robert Morris	26	7	15	4	1	2	1	27	72	86	35	10	20	5	95	115
Mercyhurst	26	4	19	3	1	0	2	16	59	113	35	4	27	4	77	150
Championship: March 22, 2025 † indicates conference regular season champion (DeGregorio Trophy) * indicates conference tournament champion (Riley Trophy); Rankings: USCHO.com Top 20 Poll

== Schedule and results ==
Date	Time	Opponent^{#}	Rank^{#}	Site	TV	Decision	Result	Attendance	Record
Exhibition
October 10	7:00 pm	at Bowling Green*		Slater Family Ice Arena • Bowling Green, Ohio (Exhibition)	Midco Sports+		L 2–7		
October 11	3:00 pm	vs. Simon Fraser*		USA Hockey Arena • Plymouth, Michigan (Exhibition)			W 2–1		
October 12	7:00 pm	at USNTDP*		USA Hockey Arena • Plymouth, Michigan (Exhibition)			L 2–3		
Regular Season
October 17	7:00 pm	at Miami*		Steve Cady Arena • Oxford, Ohio		Kochendorfer	W 5–1	2,526	1–0–0
October 19	7:00 pm	Miami*		Clearview Arena • Neville Township, Pennsylvania	FloHockey	Kochendorfer	W 4–1	1,150	2–0–0
October 25	7:00 pm	Niagara		Clearview Arena • Neville Township, Pennsylvania	FloHockey	Kochendorfer	L 3–7	751	2–1–0 (0–1–0)
October 26	7:00 pm	at Niagara		Dwyer Arena • Lewiston, New York	FloHockey	Kochendorfer	T 4–4 ^{SOW}	1,176	2–1–1 (0–1–1)
November 1	7:00 pm	Lindenwood*		Clearview Arena • Neville Township, Pennsylvania	FloHockey, SNP	Kochendorfer	W 3–0	325	3–1–1
November 2	7:00 pm	Lindenwood*		Clearview Arena • Neville Township, Pennsylvania	FloHockey	Meilun	T 2–2 ^{OT}	587	3–1–2
November 4	7:00 pm	at Mercyhurst		Mercyhurst Ice Center • Erie, Pennsylvania	FloHockey	Kochendorfer	W 5–2	1,122	4–1–2 (1–1–1)
November 15	7:00 pm	at Sacred Heart		Martire Family Arena • Fairfield, Connecticut	FloHockey	Kochendorfer	L 2–4	2,199	4–2–2 (1–2–1)
November 16	4:00 pm	at Sacred Heart		Martire Family Arena • Fairfield, Connecticut	FloHockey	Meilun	L 3–6	2,746	4–3–2 (1–3–1)
November 22	8:00 pm	at #12 North Dakota*		Ralph Engelstad Arena • Grand Forks, North Dakota	Midco	Kochendorfer	L 3–4 ^{OT}	11,576	4–4–2
November 23	7:00 pm	at #12 North Dakota*		Ralph Engelstad Arena • Grand Forks, North Dakota	Midco	Meilun	L 0–1	11,573	4–5–2
November 29	5:00 pm	American International		Clearview Arena • Neville Township, Pennsylvania	FloHockey	Meilun	W 4–1	652	5–5–2 (2–3–1)
November 30	5:00 pm	American International		Clearview Arena • Neville Township, Pennsylvania	FloHockey	Meilun	L 2–4	787	5–6–2 (2–4–1)
December 6	7:05 pm	at RIT		Gene Polisseni Center • Henrietta, New York	FloHockey	Kochendorfer	W 7–3	2,888	6–6–2 (3–4–1)
December 7	5:05 pm	at RIT		Gene Polisseni Center • Henrietta, New York	FloHockey	Kochendorfer	L 3–4	2,613	6–7–2 (3–5–1)
December 14	1:00 pm	at Canisius		LECOM Harborcenter • Buffalo, New York	FloHockey	Meilun	W 5–2	992	7–7–2 (4–5–1)
December 15	4:00 pm	at Canisius		LECOM Harborcenter • Buffalo, New York	FloHockey	Meilun	W 5–2	528	8–7–2 (5–5–1)
Desert Hockey Classic
January 3	9:00 pm	at #19 Arizona State*		Mullett Arena • Tempe, Arizona (Desert Hockey Classic Semifinal)		Meilun	L 3–7	4,182	8–8–2
January 4	5:30 pm	vs. Massachusetts*		Mullett Arena • Tempe, Arizona (Desert Hockey Classic Consolation Game)		Kochendorfer	L 0–8	1,298	8–9–2
January 10	7:00 pm	at Holy Cross		Hart Center • Worcester, Massachusetts	FloHockey	Meilun	L 1–4	640	8–10–2 (5–6–1)
January 11	6:00 pm	at Holy Cross		Hart Center • Worcester, Massachusetts	FloHockey	Meilun	T 2–2 ^{SOW}	680	8–10–3 (5–6–2)
January 17	7:00 pm	RIT		Clearview Arena • Neville Township, Pennsylvania	FloHockey	Kochendorfer	W 6–1	903	9–10–3 (6–6–2)
January 18	7:00 pm	RIT		Clearview Arena • Neville Township, Pennsylvania	FloHockey	Kochendorfer	L 2–3	785	9–11–3 (6–7–2)
January 24	7:00 pm	Army		Clearview Arena • Neville Township, Pennsylvania	FloHockey	Smith	L 3–6	673	9–12–3 (6–8–2)
January 25	7:00 pm	Army		Clearview Arena • Neville Township, Pennsylvania	FloHockey	Kochendorfer	L 0–2	925	9–13–3 (6–9–2)
January 14	7:00 pm	Canisius		Clearview Arena • Neville Township, Pennsylvania	FloHockey	Kochendorfer	L 2–4	532	9–14–3 (6–10–2)
January 31	7:00 pm	Mercyhurst		Clearview Arena • Neville Township, Pennsylvania	FloHockey	Kochendorfer	L 2–4	787	9–15–3 (6–11–2)
February 1	7:00 pm	Mercyhurst		Clearview Arena • Neville Township, Pennsylvania	FloHockey	Meilun	T 3–3 ^{SOL}	786	9–15–4 (6–11–3)
February 7	7:00 pm	at Bentley		Bentley Arena • Waltham, Massachusetts	FloHockey	Smith	L 0–1	1,467	9–16–4 (6–12–3)
February 8	6:00 pm	at Bentley		Bentley Arena • Waltham, Massachusetts	FloHockey	Meilun	L 0–6	1,210	9–17–4 (6–13–3)
February 14	6:00 pm	at Niagara		Dwyer Arena • Lewiston, New York	FloHockey	Kochendorfer	W 4–3	994	10–17–4 (7–13–3)
February 15	7:00 pm	Niagara		Clearview Arena • Neville Township, Pennsylvania	FloHockey	Kochendorfer	L 1–2	510	10–18–4 (7–14–3)
February 21	7:00 pm	Air Force		Clearview Arena • Neville Township, Pennsylvania	FloHockey	Kochendorfer	L 2–4	687	10–19–4 (7–15–3)
February 22	7:00 pm	Air Force		Clearview Arena • Neville Township, Pennsylvania	FloHockey, SNP	Kochendorfer	T 3–3 ^{SOL}	721	10–19–5 (7–15–4)
Atlantic Hockey America Tournament
March 1	7:00 pm	at Air Force*		Cadet Ice Arena • Air Force Academy, Colorado (AHA First Round)	FloHockey	Kochendorfer	L 3–4 ^{2OT}	1,355	10–20–5
*Non-conference game. ^{#}Rankings from USCHO.com Poll. All times are in Eastern Time. Source:

== Scoring statistics ==
Name	Position	Games	Goals	Assists	Points	PIM
Walter Zacher	C	35	15	9	24	21
Michael Craig	D	35	5	19	24	6
Tanner Klimpke	F	26	10	13	23	6
Michael Felsing	F	34	7	15	22	2
Cameron Garvey	C	34	7	15	22	6
Dominic Elliott	D	35	6	13	19	18
Trent Wilson	F	35	5	13	18	18
Mitchel Deelstra	C/LW	35	12	5	17	34
Luke van Why	D	31	2	12	14	12
George Krotiris	W	32	4	6	10	20
McKay Hayes	C	33	4	6	10	11
Cody Monds	RW	33	3	5	8	2
Patrick Johnson	F	34	3	5	8	24
Gavin Gulash	F	33	5	2	7	33
Greg Japchen	D	25	1	6	7	10
Gabriel Lunn	D	29	0	7	7	10
Trevor LeDonne	D	23	3	2	5	22
Braden Rourke	RW	30	2	2	4	36
Thomas Haynes	D	13	0	3	3	0
J. R. Ashmead	D	33	0	2	2	14
Connor Gourley	F	23	1	0	1	20
Thomas Gangl	D	4	0	1	1	0
Adam O'Marra	C	13	0	1	1	0
Croix Kochendorfer	G	23	0	1	1	2
Lee Chiang	F	3	0	0	0	0
Eric DeDobbelaer	C/RW	5	0	0	0	0
Dawson Smith	G	5	0	0	0	2
Dylan Meilun	G	12	0	0	0	0
Total			95	163	258	339

== Goaltending statistics ==
Name	Games	Minutes	Wins	Losses	Ties	Goals Against	Saves	Shut Outs	SV %	GAA
Dawson Smith	5	130:55	0	2	0	6	59	0	.908	2.75
Croix Kochendorfer	23	1341:45	7	12	3	65	637	1	.906	2.91
Dylan Meilun	12	676:48	3	6	2	38	309	0	.890	3.37
Empty Net	-	17:40	-	-	-	4	-	-	-	-
Total	35	2167:08	10	20	5	114	1005	1	.898	3.16

== Rankings ==
Poll	Week																											
Poll	Pre	1	2	3	4	5	6	7	8	9	10	11	12	13	14	15	16	17	18	19	20	21	22	23	24	25	26	27 (Final)
USCHO.com	NR	NR	NR	NR	NR	NR	NR	NR	NR	NR	NR	NR	–	NR	NR	NR	NR	NR	NR	NR	NR	NR	NR	NR	NR	NR	–	NR
USA Hockey	NR	NR	NR	NR	NR	NR	NR	NR	NR	NR	NR	NR	–	NR	NR	NR	NR	NR	NR	NR	NR	NR	NR	NR	NR	NR	NR	NR

Note: USCHO did not release a poll in week 12 or 26.
Note: USA Hockey did not release a poll in week 12.

== Awards and honors ==
Player	Award	Ref
Dominic Elliott	Atlantic Hockey America All-Rookie Team	
