= 2024–25 RIT Tigers men's ice hockey season =

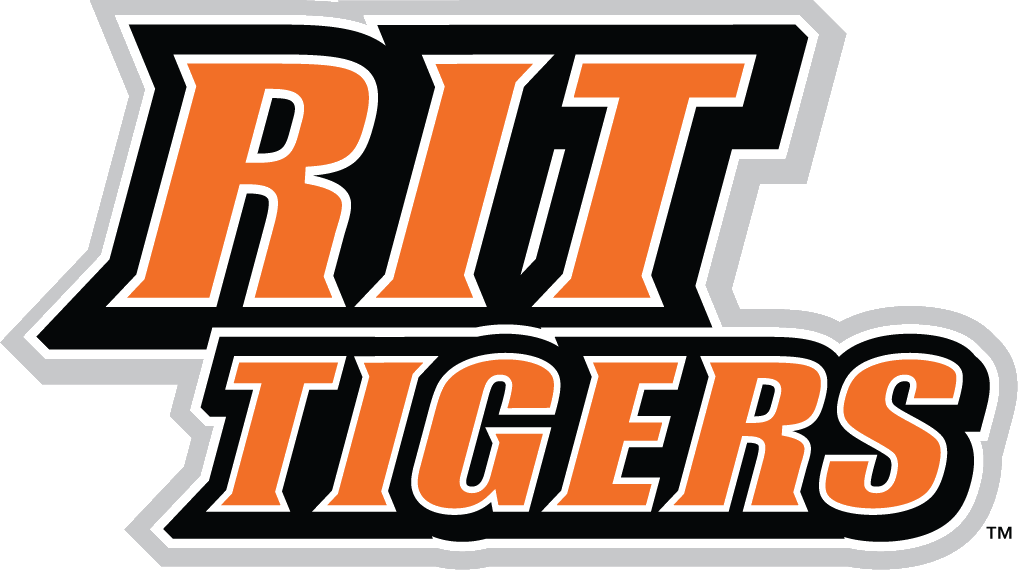
- Conference: 9th AHA
- Home ice: Gene Polisseni Center

Rankings
- USCHO: NR
- USA Hockey: NR

Record
- Overall: 10–23–2
- Conference: 9–15–2
- Home: 4–11–1
- Road: 6–11–1
- Neutral: 0–1–0

Coaches and captains
- Head coach: Wayne Wilson
- Assistant coaches: Brian Hills; David Insalaco; Mike Rotolo
- Captains: Tanner Andrew; Grady Hobbs; Dimitri Mikrogiannakis

The 2024–25 RIT Tigers men's ice hockey season was the 61st season of play for the program, the 20th at the Division I level and the 1st in Atlantic Hockey America. The Tigers represented the Rochester Institute of Technology in the 2024–25 NCAA Division I men's ice hockey season, played their home games at the Gene Polisseni Center and were coached by Wayne Wilson in his 26th season.

== Season ==
Fresh off of one of the best seasons in program history, RIT was expected to take a small step back but was still thought of as one of the top teams in Atlantic Hockey America. The loss of several star players, including its top four scorers and starting goaltender, diminished the lineup but did not completely denude the team of talent. However, once the season was underway, it became apparent that not all of the holes in the lineup had been plugged. The offense was a little slow out of the gate thanks in no small part to Matthew Wilde missing the first month of the season due to a preseason injury. Even after his return, the scoring never quite got up to snuff; beyond the top line the Tigers had a great deal of trouble scoring and saw their goal total nearly cut in half.

A bigger problem for the Tigers came in goal. Senior transfer Trent Burnham very soon proved himself to not be up to the task as the team's starting netminder. This left coach Wilson to rely mostly on Jakub Krbeček, a freshman who wasn't quite used to the pace of the college game. The lack of scoring and the inconsistent play in goal put RIT in a bad spot throughout the first half of the season. The Tigers were able to win just 4 of their first 19 matches and had them mired near the bottom of the standings. Things didn't get much better for the club after returning from winter break. Even with Ethan David thrown into the mix in goal, the Tigers went 1–6 after their return to play and looked to be heading for their worst season as a Division I program. Right at the end of January, Krbeček turned in his best performance all season, allowing the Tigers to sweep their first weekend series all season at Air Force. Just when it looked like their luck might have turned, everything went pair-shaped in the next game when they were hammered by Holy Cross in the worst outing of the campaign. After Krbeček allowed 7 goals in the first period, David took over and remained in the crease for the remainder of the season.

While RIT finished the final two weeks of the regular season winning each of their games (once in a shootout), that only allowed them to finish 9th in the conference standings. While the team got a solid performance in goal, the offense faltered and the Tigers were only able to scrounge a single goal. The overtime loss ended a rather forgettable season for the program.

== Departures ==
Player	Position	Nationality	Cause
Gianfranco Cassaro	Defenseman	Canada	Graduation (signed with Lehigh Valley Phantoms)
Daniel Chenard	Goaltender	Canada	Graduation (retired)
Elijah Gonsalves	Forward	Canada	Graduation (signed with Cincinnati Cyclones)
Aiden Hansen-Bukata	Defenseman	Canada	Graduate transfer to Ohio State
Cody Laskosky	Forward	Canada	Graduate transfer to Wisconsin
Luke Lush	Goaltender	Canada	Graduation (signed with Tulsa Oilers)
Caleb Moretz	Forward	United States	Graduation (retired)
Ryan Nicholson	Defenseman	Canada	Graduation (signed with Savannah Ghost Pirates)
Tommy Scarfone	Goaltender	Canada	Transferred to Wisconsin
Carter Wilkie	Forward	Canada	Transferred to North Dakota

== Recruiting ==
Player	Position	Nationality	Age	Notes
Tristan Allen	Defenseman	Canada	21	Kamloops, BC
Trent Burnham	Goaltender	United States	24	Eagle River, AK; transfer from Lindenwood
Nick Cafarelli	Forward	United States	22	Middleton, MA; graduate transfer from New Hampshire
Mathieu Cobetto-Roy	Forward	United States	20	Outremont, QC
Mason Croucher	Defenseman	Canada	20	Victoria, BC
Ethan David	Goaltender	Canada	20	Vancouver, BC
Jakub Krbeček	Goaltender	Czech Republic	21	Prague, CZE
Kevin Marx Norén	Forward	Sweden	22	Knivsta, SWE; transfer from Northern Michigan
Ty Whyte	Forward	Canada	21	Richmond, ON
Ryan Williams	Defenseman	United States	21	Pleasantville, OH

== Roster ==
As of September 10, 2024.

No.	Nat.	Player	Class	Pos	Height	Weight	DoB	Hometown	Previous team	NHL rights
1	(Czech Republic)	Jakub Krbeček	Freshman	G	6' 2" (1.88 m)	194 lb (88 kg)	2003-02-01	Prague, Czech Republic	Philadelphia Rebels (NAHL)	—
3	(United States)	Ryan Williams	Freshman	D	6' 3" (1.91 m)	201 lb (91 kg)	2003-06-08	Pleasantville, Ohio	Janesville Jets (NAHL)	—
4	(Canada)	Dimitri Mikrogiannakis (C)	Graduate	D	6' 1" (1.85 m)	200 lb (91 kg)	1999-09-20	Aurora, Ontario	Cowichan Valley Capitals (BCHL)	—
5	(Sweden)	Gustav Blom	Junior	F	6' 0" (1.83 m)	180 lb (82 kg)	2001-01-30	Stockholm, Sweden	New Mexico Ice Wolves (USHL)	—
6	(Canada)	Matthew Wilde	Sophomore	D	6' 2" (1.88 m)	198 lb (90 kg)	2002-04-30	Mississauga, Ontario	Toronto Jr. Canadiens (OJHL)	—
7	(Canada)	Tanner Andrew (C)	Senior	F	5' 9" (1.75 m)	170 lb (77 kg)	2000-02-11	Virden, Manitoba	Chilliwack Chiefs (BCHL)	—
8	(Canada)	Evan Miller	Senior	F	5' 11" (1.8 m)	175 lb (79 kg)	2000-03-07	Niagara-on-the-Lake, Ontario	Wellington Dukes (OJHL)	—
9	(Canada)	Tyler Fukakusa	Sophomore	F	5' 11" (1.8 m)	180 lb (82 kg)	2002-008-14	Toronto, Ontario	Toronto Jr. Canadiens (OJHL)	—
10	(Canada)	Philippe Jacques	Junior	F	6' 4" (1.93 m)	200 lb (91 kg)	2002-10-29	Quebec City, Quebec	Ottawa Jr. Senators (CCHL)	—
11	(United States)	Nick Cafarelli	Graduate	F	5' 10" (1.78 m)	182 lb (83 kg)	2001-12-31	Middleton, Massachusetts	New Hampshire (HEA)	—
12	(Canada)	Simon Isabelle	Junior	F	5' 10" (1.78 m)	170 lb (77 kg)	2001-01-12	Whitehorse, Yukon	Ottawa Jr. Senators (CCHL)	—
14	(Canada)	Tyler Mahan	Junior	F	6' 0" (1.83 m)	190 lb (86 kg)	2001-12-14	Calgary, Alberta	Whitecourt Wolverines (AJHL)	—
15	(Canada)	Adam Jeffery	Junior	F	6' 5" (1.96 m)	200 lb (91 kg)	2001-05-08	Leamington, Ontario	Leamington Flyers (GOJHL)	—
16	(Canada)	Ty Whyte	Freshman	F	6' 0" (1.83 m)	174 lb (79 kg)	2003-04-02	Richmond, Ontario	Kemptville 73's (CCHL)	—
17	(Canada)	Tristan Allen	Freshman	D	5' 11" (1.8 m)	181 lb (82 kg)	2003-08-05	Kamloops, British Columbia	Salmon Arm Silverbacks (CCHL)	—
18	(United States)	Kevin Scott	Sophomore	D	6' 3" (1.91 m)	215 lb (98 kg)	2003-04-30	Ashburn, Virginia	Fargo Force (USHL)	—
20	(Sweden)	Kevin Marx Norén	Sophomore	F	6' 1" (1.85 m)	190 lb (86 kg)	2002-07-15	Knivsta, Sweden	Northern Michigan (CCHA)	—
21	(Canada)	Mathieu Cobetto-Roy	Freshman	F	5' 11" (1.8 m)	174 lb (79 kg)	2003-10-21	Outremont, Quebec	Trail Smoke Eaters (BCHL)	—
22	(Canada)	Grady Hobbs (C)	Senior	F	5' 8" (1.73 m)	177 lb (80 kg)	2000-03-18	Deloraine, Manitoba	Dauphin Kings (MJHL)	—
23	(Canada)	Christian Catalano	Sophomore	F	6' 1" (1.85 m)	190 lb (86 kg)	2003-05-23	Mississauga, Ontario	Maryland Black Bears (NAHL)	—
24	(Canada)	Mason Croucher	Freshman	D	6' 2" (1.88 m)	185 lb (84 kg)	1999-01-13	Victoria, British Columbia	Alberni Valley Bulldogs (BCHL)	—
25	(Canada)	Doug Scott	Senior	D	5' 10" (1.78 m)	190 lb (86 kg)	2000-04-16	North Vancouver, British Columbia	Humboldt Broncos (SJHL)	—
27	(Canada)	Crossley Stewart	Sophomore	D	6' 3" (1.91 m)	190 lb (86 kg)	2002-05-30	Prince Rupert, British Columbia	Burlington Cougars (OJHL)	—
28	(Canada)	Xavier Lapointe	Junior	D	6' 0" (1.83 m)	190 lb (86 kg)	2002-01-26	Quebec City, Quebec	Flin Flon Bombers (SJHL)	—
32	(United States)	Trent Burnham	Senior	G	6' 0" (1.83 m)	160 lb (73 kg)	2000-03-27	Eagle River, Alaska	Lindenwood (NCAA)	—
40	(Canada)	Ethan David	Freshman	G	6' 3" (1.91 m)	201 lb (91 kg)	2003-12-17	Vancouver, British Columbia	Vernon Vipers (BCHL)	—

== Standings ==
2024–25 Atlantic Hockey America Standings
	Conference record										Overall record					
	GP	W	L	T	OW	OL	SW	PTS	GF	GA	GP	W	L	T	GF	GA
Holy Cross †	26	19	5	2	4	0	1	56	92	47	40	24	14	2	130	94
Sacred Heart	26	16	7	3	1	1	2	53	80	64	39	21	13	5	118	101
#19 Bentley *	26	16	9	1	1	2	1	51	79	57	40	23	15	2	115	83
Niagara	26	15	9	2	3	3	1	48	90	70	37	18	16	3	124	109
Army	26	14	10	2	2	0	2	44	84	74	38	16	20	2	105	117
Canisius	26	11	13	2	0	3	0	38	84	79	37	12	23	2	98	120
Air Force	26	11	13	2	2	3	1	37	59	58	40	16	21	3	86	112
American International	26	9	16	1	0	3	0	31	63	77	38	13	23	2	92	117
RIT	26	9	15	2	2	0	1	28	65	102	35	10	23	2	82	133
Robert Morris	26	7	15	4	1	2	1	27	72	86	35	10	20	5	95	115
Mercyhurst	26	4	19	3	1	0	2	16	59	113	35	4	27	4	77	150
Championship: March 22, 2025 † indicates conference regular season champion (DeGregorio Trophy) * indicates conference tournament champion (Riley Trophy); Rankings: USCHO.com Top 20 Poll

== Schedule and results ==
Date	Time	Opponent^{#}	Rank^{#}	Site	TV	Decision	Result	Attendance	Record
Regular Season
October 5	7:00 pm	at St. Lawrence*		Appleton Arena • Canton, New York	ESPN+	Burnham	L 2–3 ^{OT}	1,235	0–1–0
October 6	4:00 pm	at Clarkson*		Cheel Arena • Potsdam, New York	ESPN+	Krbeček	W 3–2	2,136	1–1–0
October 11	7:00 pm	at Mercyhurst		Mercyhurst Ice Center • Erie, Pennsylvania	FloHockey	Burnham	L 2–4	876	1–2–0 (0–1–0)
October 12	4:00 pm	at Mercyhurst		Mercyhurst Ice Center • Erie, Pennsylvania	FloHockey	Krbeček	W 4–2	939	2–2–0 (1–1–0)
October 19	7:05 pm	Bowling Green*		Blue Cross Arena • Rochester, New York	FloHockey	Krbeček	L 1–2 ^{OT}	10,566	2–3–0
October 25	7:05 pm	Colgate*		Gene Polisseni Center • Henrietta, New York	FloHockey	Krbeček	L 4–5	3,170	2–4–0
October 26	5:05 pm	Colgate*		Gene Polisseni Center • Henrietta, New York	FloHockey	Burnham	L 3–4	2,857	2–5–0
October 30	7:05 pm	at Niagara		Dwyer Arena • Lewiston, New York	FloHockey	Krbeček	L 1–4	883	2–6–0 (0–1–0)
November 8	7:00 pm	at Bentley		Bentley Arena • Waltham, Massachusetts	FloHockey	Burnham	L 0–5	1,050	2–7–0 (0–2–0)
November 9	4:00 pm	at Bentley		Bentley Arena • Waltham, Massachusetts	FloHockey	Krbeček	W 6–2	1,234	3–7–0 (1–2–0)
November 15	7:05 pm	Army		Gene Polisseni Center • Henrietta, New York	FloHockey	Krbeček	L 1–5	4,300	3–8–0 (1–3–0)
November 16	7:05 pm	Army		Gene Polisseni Center • Henrietta, New York	FloHockey	Krbeček	L 2–4	3,768	3–9–0 (1–4–0)
November 22	7:00 pm	at Sacred Heart		Martire Family Arena • Fairfield, Connecticut	FloHockey	Burnham	L 2–3	2,505	3–10–0 (1–5–0)
November 23	7:00 pm	at Sacred Heart		Martire Family Arena • Fairfield, Connecticut	FloHockey	Krbeček	T 3–3 ^{SOL}	2,910	3–10–1 (1–5–1)
November 29	7:00 pm	at New Hampshire*		Whittemore Center • Durham, New Hampshire	ESPN+	Krbeček	L 1–5	3,717	3–11–1
November 30	4:00 pm	at New Hampshire*		Whittemore Center • Durham, New Hampshire	ESPN+	David	L 1–6	3,619	3–12–1
December 3	7:05 pm	Canisius		Gene Polisseni Center • Henrietta, New York	FloHockey	Krbeček	L 4–6	1,923	3–13–1 (1–6–1)
December 6	7:05 pm	Robert Morris		Gene Polisseni Center • Henrietta, New York	FloHockey	Burnham	L 3–7	2,888	3–14–1 (1–7–1)
December 7	5:05 pm	Robert Morris		Gene Polisseni Center • Henrietta, New York	FloHockey	David	W 4–3	2,613	4–14–1 (2–7–1)
December 29	3:00 pm	at Bowling Green*		Slater Family Ice Arena • Bowling Green, Ohio	Midco Sports+	Krbeček	L 1–2	3,297	4–15–1
January 4	5:05 pm	Guelph*		Gene Polisseni Center • Henrietta, New York (Exhibition)	FloHockey	David	W 5–3	1,104	
January 10	7:00 pm	at Canisius		LECOM Harborcenter • Buffalo, New York	FloHockey	Krbeček	L 2–5	855	4–16–1 (2–8–1)
January 11	7:00 pm	at Canisius		LECOM Harborcenter • Buffalo, New York	FloHockey	David	L 2–5	1,064	4–17–1 (2–9–1)
January 17	7:05 pm	at Robert Morris		Clearview Arena • Neville Township, Pennsylvania	FloHockey	Krbeček	L 1–6	903	4–18–1 (2–10–1)
January 18	7:05 pm	at Robert Morris		Clearview Arena • Neville Township, Pennsylvania	FloHockey	Burnham	W 3–2	785	5–18–1 (3–10–1)
January 24	7:05 pm	Niagara		Gene Polisseni Center • Henrietta, New York	FloHockey	Burnham	L 0–7	3,946	5–19–1 (3–11–1)
January 25	5:05 pm	Niagara		Gene Polisseni Center • Henrietta, New York	FloHockey	Krbeček	L 3–6	4,300	5–20–1 (3–12–1)
January 31	10:00 pm	at Air Force		Cadet Ice Arena • USAF Academy, Colorado	FloHockey	Krbeček	W 2–1	2,327	6–20–1 (4–12–1)
February 1	8:00 pm	at Air Force		Cadet Ice Arena • USAF Academy, Colorado	FloHockey	Krbeček	W 3–2 ^{OT}	2,586	7–20–1 (5–12–1)
February 7	7:05 pm	Holy Cross		Gene Polisseni Center • Henrietta, New York	FloHockey	Krbeček	L 2–9	2,615	7–21–1 (5–13–1)
February 8	5:05 pm	Holy Cross		Gene Polisseni Center • Henrietta, New York	FloHockey	David	L 0–3	3,162	7–22–1 (5–14–1)
February 14	7:05 pm	American International		Gene Polisseni Center • Henrietta, New York	FloHockey	David	W 3–0	2,517	8–22–1 (6–14–1)
February 15	7:05 pm	American International		Gene Polisseni Center • Henrietta, New York	FloHockey	David	T 3–3 ^{SOW}	2,617	8–22–2 (6–14–2)
February 21	7:05 pm	Mercyhurst		Gene Polisseni Center • Henrietta, New York	FloHockey	David	W 3–2	3,045	9–22–2 (7–14–2)
February 22	5:05 pm	Mercyhurst		Gene Polisseni Center • Henrietta, New York	FloHockey	David	W 6–3	3,138	10–22–2 (8–14–2)
Atlantic Hockey Tournament
February 28	6:05 pm	vs. American International*		Tate Rink • West Point, New York (AHA First Round)	FloHockey	David	L 1–2 ^{OT}	171	10–23–2
*Non-conference game. ^{#}Rankings from USCHO.com Poll. All times are in Eastern Time. Source:

== Scoring statistics ==
Name	Position	Games	Goals	Assists	Points	PIM
Tyler Fukakusa	C	35	9	27	36	18
Matthew Wilde	LW	27	18	14	32	24
Christian Catalano	RW	33	7	16	23	73
Tanner Andrew	C	34	7	9	16	33
Xavier Lapointe	D	27	5	10	15	45
Tristan Allen	D	33	2	13	15	45
Simon Isabelle	RW	35	7	7	14	12
Dimitri Mikrogiannakis	D	30	4	7	11	17
Grady Hobbs	LW/RW	31	4	5	9	8
Nicholas Cafarelli	F	33	1	7	8	34
Philippe Jacques	C	34	4	2	6	6
Crossley Stewart	D	24	3	3	6	21
Tyler Mahan	LW	35	3	2	5	15
Ty Whyte	C	27	2	2	4	26
Kevin Scott	D	35	0	4	4	14
Adam Jeffery	LW	26	1	2	3	6
Mathieu Cobetto-Roy	F	29	0	3	3	12
Gustav Blom	D	26	2	0	2	8
Evan Miller	C	28	1	1	2	8
Doug Scott	D	28	1	1	2	10
Kevin Marx Norén	LW/RW	5	1	0	1	0
Jakub Krbeček	G	18	0	1	1	4
Ryan Williams	D	29	0	1	1	8
Trent Burnham	G	9	0	0	0	2
Ethan David	G	12	0	0	0	0
Mason Croucher	D	21	0	0	0	10
Total			82	137	219	461

== Goaltending statistics ==
Name	Games	Minutes	Wins	Losses	Ties	Goals Against	Saves	Shut Outs	SV %	GAA
Ethan David	12	650:18	4	4	1	29	290	1	.909	2.68
Jakub Krbeček	19	1001:07	5	12	1	65	540	0	.893	3.90
Trent Burnham	10	456:01	1	7	0	33	195	0	.855	4.34
Empty Net	-	20:36	-	-	-	6	-	-	-	-
Total	35	2128:02	10	23	2	133	1025	1	.885	3.75

== Rankings ==
Poll	Week																											
Poll	Pre	1	2	3	4	5	6	7	8	9	10	11	12	13	14	15	16	17	18	19	20	21	22	23	24	25	26	27 (Final)
USCHO.com	NR	NR	NR	NR	NR	NR	NR	NR	NR	NR	NR	NR	–	NR	NR	NR	NR	NR	NR	NR	NR	NR	NR	NR	NR	NR	–	NR
USA Hockey	NR	NR	NR	NR	NR	NR	NR	NR	NR	NR	NR	NR	–	NR	NR	NR	NR	NR	NR	NR	NR	NR	NR	NR	NR	NR	NR	NR

Note: USCHO did not release a poll in week 12 or 26.
Note: USA Hockey did not release a poll in week 12.

== Awards and honors ==
Player	Award	Ref
Matthew Wilde	All-Atlantic Hockey America First Team	
Tyler Fukakusa	All-Atlantic Hockey America Third Team	
