= 2024–25 Army Black Knights men's ice hockey season =

- Conference: 5th AHA
- Home ice: Tate Rink

Rankings
- USCHO: NR
- USA Hockey: NR

Record
- Overall: 16–20–2
- Conference: 14–10–2
- Home: 8–6–1
- Road: 8–13–1
- Neutral: 0–1–0

Coaches and captains
- Head coach: Brian Riley
- Assistant coaches: Zach McKelvie; Chris Azzano; Jack Riley; Taylor Ward
- Captain: Michael Sacco

The 2024–25 Army Black Knights men's ice hockey season was the 122nd season of play for the program, the 115th at the Division I level, and the 1st in Atlantic Hockey America. The Black Knights represented the United States Military Academy, played their home games at the Tate Rink and were coached by Brian Riley in his 21st season.

== Season ==
In the summer of 2024, Brian Riley announced that this would be his final season as head coach. At the same time, associate head coach Zach McKelvie was tabbed as Riley's replacement.

The season itself began poorly for Army. The offense was able to find some consistency over the first month but senior netminder Evan Szary could not keep the puck out of the Knights' cage. J. J. Cataldo began to see some time in goal by the end of October and the results began to improve for the team. By mid-November, the Black Knights were hovering around .500 and appeared to be an improving team. Unfortunately, that's when the season took a sharp decline. Army lost nine consecutive games around the winter break largely due to their inability to score. While the goaltending from both Cataldo and Szary wasn't stellar, there was little the netminders could do when the Black Knights scored 3 goals over a 6-game stretch. The nadir was an embarrassing, 2–8 loss to American International that came despite Army firing 51 shots on goal.

The shellacking from AIC appeared to wake the team up because the very next weekend, Army looked like a completely different team against Mercyhurst. Though the Lakers were the worst team all season in college hockey, their two biggest defeats for the season came from the hands of the Black Knights. After hammering Mercyhurst 9–1 in the first game, Army eviscerated the Lakers 13–1. It was the most goals Army had scored in a game since 1997 and the largest margin of victory in 58 years. Virtually every player on Army recorded a point during the weekend, including third string netminder Jacob Biron, but the hero of the hour was Mac Gadowsky, who finished with 7 points (as did Nils Forselius and Nik Hong). The rather stunning results completely changed the complexion of Army's season. The Knights continued their inspired play for the remainder of their schedule. The team went 9–2–2 over the final seven weeks and nearly managed to pull back to .500. However, since most of their losses were against non-conference opponents, the Knights managed to finish 5th in the conference standings and earn the final bye into the quarterfinals.

Army opened its postseason at Niagara and outworked the Purple Eagles for most of the night. Unfortunately, the Knights' offense was a little rusty after a week off and failed to convert on eight power play opportunities. Despite the failure of its special teams, Army was able to overcome two 1-goal deficits and force overtime. It took another 34 minutes of game time for the winning goal to be scored and, on Army's ninth man-advantage of the night, Gadowsky scored to give the Black Knights a lead in the series. The rematch saw Niagara take a 3-goal lead early in the third thanks to two special teams goals. Despite this, Gadowsky did his best to even the score by contributing on each of Army's three goals in the game but the comeback ultimately ran out of time. The deciding game was a little bit tighter in terms of play with Army twice able to get a lead. Two goals in the third from the Eagles had the score even after 60 minutes and overtime was called for once more. Less than 3 minutes into the extra session, Niagara took its second penalty of the game and Barron Woodring made them pay with the winning goal just 21 seconds later.

With their first series win in four years, Army's reward was a date with league champion Holy Cross. The first game saw both goaltenders turn aside a barrage of shots with Gadowsky again keeping Army in the game. Twice he had a hand in tying goals for the Knights and forced the match to head into a fourth period once again. This time, however, it was the home team that was able to get the winning tally and put the Knights behind the 8-ball. The loss appeared to sap the strength out of the team and in the next game the Cinderella run for the Knights ended with their season turning back into a pumpkin. Holy Cross scored the first four goals of the game and essentially put the match out of reach for Army. The team battled hard but going 0 for 4 on the power play left the Knights with little ability to erase the massive deficit. The loss ended Army's season but it did not obscure the team's stellar performance over the final two and a half months.

== Departures ==
Player	Position	Nationality	Cause
Gavin Abric	Goaltender	United States	Graduation (signed with Peoria Rivermen)
John Driscoll	Defenseman	United States	Transferred to Sacred Heart
Jacob Felker	Forward	United States	Graduation (retired)
Jacob Hewitt	Forward	United States	Transferred to Sacred Heart
Dayne Hoyord	Defenseman	United States	Transferred to Wisconsin-Eau Claire
Eric Huss	Forward	United States	Graduation (retired)
Max Itagaki	Forward	United States	Transferred to Rensselaer
Ricky Lyle	Forward	United States	Graduation (signed with Toledo Walleye)

== Recruiting ==
Player	Position	Nationality	Age	Notes
Noah Alvarez	Forward	United States	21	Los Angeles, CA
Jacob Biron	Goaltender	United States	20	Buffalo, NY
J. J. Cataldo	Forward	United States	21	Stuart, FL
Nils Forselius	Forward	United States	20	Guilford, CT
Benjamin Ivey	Forward	United States	20	San Diego, CA
Jack Ivey	Forward	United States	20	San Diego, CA
Adam Marshall	Forward	United States	21	Wayzata, MN
Dylan Wegner	Forward	United States	20	Nashville, TN

== Roster ==
As of July 29, 2024.

No.	Nat.	Player	Class	Pos	Height	Weight	DoB	Hometown	Previous team	NHL rights
1	(United States)	Jacob Biron	Freshman	G	6' 3" (1.91 m)	174 lb (79 kg)	2004-06-26	Buffalo, New York	Kemptville 73's (CCHL)	—
2	(United States)	Mac Gadowsky	Sophomore	D	6' 3" (1.91 m)	185 lb (84 kg)	2002-01-10	Fairbanks, Alaska	Fairbanks Ice Dogs (NAHL)	—
3	(United States)	Easton Zueger	Sophomore	D	5' 8" (1.73 m)	190 lb (86 kg)	2003-06-07	Sioux Falls, South Dakota	Sioux City Musketeers (USHL)	—
4	(United States)	Benjamin Ivey	Freshman	F	6' 4" (1.93 m)	220 lb (100 kg)	2004-02-12	San Diego, California	Amarillo Wranglers (NAHL)	—
5	(United States)	Jack Ivey	Freshman	F	6' 3" (1.91 m)	192 lb (87 kg)	2004-02-12	San Diego, California	Amarillo Wranglers (NAHL)	—
6	(United States)	Pierce Patterson	Sophomore	D	5' 9" (1.75 m)	165 lb (75 kg)	2002-02-26	Valrico, Florida	Amarillo Wranglers (NAHL)	—
7	(United States)	Andrew Gilbert	Senior	D	6' 5" (1.96 m)	210 lb (95 kg)	2000-05-02	Fairfield, Connecticut	Jersey Hitmen (NCDC)	—
8	(United States)	Vincent Salice	Sophomore	F	5' 7" (1.7 m)	175 lb (79 kg)	2003-02-28	Commerce Township, Michigan	Omaha Lancers (USHL)	—
9	(United States)	Nils Forselius	Freshman	F	5' 9" (1.75 m)	170 lb (77 kg)	2003-10-30	Guilford, Connecticut	Maine Nordiques (NAHL)	—
10	(United States)	Dylan Wegner	Freshman	F	6' 2" (1.88 m)	174 lb (79 kg)	2004-06-01	Nashville, Tennessee	Merritt Centennials (BCHL)	—
11	(United States)	Josh Bohlin	Senior	F	6' 1" (1.85 m)	190 lb (86 kg)	2000-02-10	Wausau, Wisconsin	Minnesota Wilderness (NAHL)	—
12	(United States)	Sam Groebner	Freshman	F	6' 3" (1.91 m)	201 lb (91 kg)	2003-03-03	Apple Valley, Minnesota	Wisconsin Windigo (NAHL)	—
13	(United States)	Michael Sacco (C)	Senior	F	5' 8" (1.73 m)	175 lb (79 kg)	1999-11-16	Syosset, New York	Wilkes-Barre/Scranton Knights (NAHL)	—
14	(United States)	Owen Nolan	Junior	D	6' 0" (1.83 m)	185 lb (84 kg)	2000-03-10	Mahopac, New York	Lone Star Brahmas (NAHL)	—
15	(United States)	Lucas Kanta	Junior	F	6' 2" (1.88 m)	195 lb (88 kg)	2001-04-20	Grand Forks, North Dakota	Minnesota Magicians (NAHL)	—
16	(United States)	Hunter McCoy	Senior	F	6' 0" (1.83 m)	195 lb (88 kg)	2000-08-01	Newburyport, Massachusetts	Maryland Black Bears (NAHL)	—
17	(United States)	Noah Alvarez	Freshman	F	5' 11" (1.8 m)	185 lb (84 kg)	2003-03-30	Los Angeles, California	Nanaimo Clippers (NAHL)	—
18	(United States)	Jon Bell	Sophomore	D	5' 10" (1.78 m)	205 lb (93 kg)	2002-06-22	St. Cloud, Minnesota	Wisconsin Windigo (NAHL)	—
19	(United States)	Nik Hong	Sophomore	F	5' 11" (1.8 m)	185 lb (84 kg)	2002-08-27	Minneapolis, Minnesota	St. Cloud Norsemen (NAHL)	—
20	(United States)	Sean Vlasich	Junior	D	5' 9" (1.75 m)	175 lb (79 kg)	2001-04-20	Hillsdale, New Jersey	North Iowa Bulls (NAHL)	—
21	(United States)	Stephen Willey	Junior	F	6' 1" (1.85 m)	195 lb (88 kg)	2001-03-26	Shelton, Connecticut	New Jersey Titans (NAHL)	—
22	(United States)	Jude Brower	Junior	D	6' 1" (1.85 m)	180 lb (82 kg)	2001-06-11	Mahopac, New York	Boston Junior Bruins (NCDC)	—
23	(United States)	Joey Baez	Senior	F	5' 9" (1.75 m)	175 lb (79 kg)	2000-01-12	Tampa, Florida	Lone Star Brahmas (NAHL)	—
24	(United States)	Andrew Garby	Senior	D	5' 9" (1.75 m)	160 lb (73 kg)	2000-09-17	Canton, Michigan	Fairbanks Ice Dogs (NAHL)	—
25	(United States)	Barron Woodring	Sophomore	F	6' 2" (1.88 m)	200 lb (91 kg)	2002-07-05	Chicago, Illinois	Rockets Hockey Club (NCDC)	—
26	(United States)	Joey Dosan	Junior	F	6' 6" (1.98 m)	220 lb (100 kg)	2001-03-20	Bloomington, Minnesota	Springfield Jr. Blues (NAHL)	—
27	(United States)	Trevor Smith	Junior	F	5' 9" (1.75 m)	185 lb (84 kg)	2001-03-02	Raleigh, North Carolina	Boston Advantage (NCDC)	—
28	(United States)	Brent Keefer	Sophomore	F	6' 0" (1.83 m)	170 lb (77 kg)	2001-09-28	Colorado Springs, Colorado	Northeast Generals (NAHL)	—
29	(United States)	Adam Marshall	Freshman	F	5' 10" (1.78 m)	181 lb (82 kg)	2003-07-14	Wayzata, Minnesota	Trail Smoke Eaters (NAHL)	—
30	(United States)	J. J. Cataldo	Freshman	G	6' 0" (1.83 m)	170 lb (77 kg)	2003-02-20	Stuart, Florida	Springfield Jr. Blues (NAHL)	—
31	(United States)	Evan Szary	Senior	G	5' 11" (1.8 m)	175 lb (79 kg)	2000-02-29	Nashville, Tennessee	South Shore Kings (NCDC)	—
33	(United States)	Gus Holt	Sophomore	G	6' 3" (1.91 m)	206 lb (93 kg)	2003-02-21	Bowling Green, Ohio	Victoria Grizzlies (BCHL)	—

== Standings ==
2024–25 Atlantic Hockey America Standings
	Conference record										Overall record					
	GP	W	L	T	OW	OL	SW	PTS	GF	GA	GP	W	L	T	GF	GA
Holy Cross †	26	19	5	2	4	0	1	56	92	47	40	24	14	2	130	94
Sacred Heart	26	16	7	3	1	1	2	53	80	64	39	21	13	5	118	101
#19 Bentley *	26	16	9	1	1	2	1	51	79	57	40	23	15	2	115	83
Niagara	26	15	9	2	3	3	1	48	90	70	37	18	16	3	124	109
Army	26	14	10	2	2	0	2	44	84	74	38	16	20	2	105	117
Canisius	26	11	13	2	0	3	0	38	84	79	37	12	23	2	98	120
Air Force	26	11	13	2	2	3	1	37	59	58	40	16	21	3	86	112
American International	26	9	16	1	0	3	0	31	63	77	38	13	23	2	92	117
RIT	26	9	15	2	2	0	1	28	65	102	35	10	23	2	82	133
Robert Morris	26	7	15	4	1	2	1	27	72	86	35	10	20	5	95	115
Mercyhurst	26	4	19	3	1	0	2	16	59	113	35	4	27	4	77	150
Championship: March 22, 2025 † indicates conference regular season champion (DeGregorio Trophy) * indicates conference tournament champion (Riley Trophy); Rankings: USCHO.com Top 20 Poll

== Schedule and results ==
Date	Time	Opponent^{#}	Rank^{#}	Site	TV	Decision	Result	Attendance	Record
Regular Season
October 6	4:00 pm	at Union*		Achilles Rink • Schenectady, New York	ESPN+	Szary	L 3–4 ^{OT}	1,553	0–1–0
October 12	7:00 pm	at #11 Maine*		Alfond Arena • Orono, Maine (Exhibition)	ESPN+	Biron	L 0–5	3,652	
October 19	7:00 pm	at Holy Cross		Hart Center • Worcester, Massachusetts	FloHockey	Szary	W 1–0	692	1–1–0
October 20	5:00 pm	at Holy Cross		Hart Center • Worcester, Massachusetts	FloHockey	Szary	L 3–5	809	1–2–0
October 25	7:00 pm	Bentley		Tate Rink • West Point, New York	FloHockey	Szary	L 3–6	1,786	1–3–0 (0–1–0)
October 26	4:00 pm	Bentley		Tate Rink • West Point, New York	FloHockey	Cataldo	W 4–1	1,917	2–3–0 (1–1–0)
October 31	6:00 pm	at Canisius		LECOM Harborcenter • Buffalo, New York	FloHockey	Cataldo	L 0–4	485	2–4–0 (1–2–0)
November 1	6:00 pm	at Canisius		LECOM Harborcenter • Buffalo, New York	FloHockey	Szary	L 1–6	1,029	2–5–0 (1–3–0)
November 8	7:00 pm	Niagara		Tate Rink • West Point, New York	FloHockey	Cataldo	W 1–0	1,539	3–5–0 (2–3–0)
November 9	4:00 pm	Niagara		Tate Rink • West Point, New York	FloHockey	Cataldo	L 0–2	1,742	3–6–0 (2–4–0)
November 15	7:00 pm	at RIT		Gene Polisseni Center • Henrietta, New York	FloHockey	Cataldo	W 5–1	4,300	4–6–0 (3–4–0)
November 16	7:00 pm	at RIT		Gene Polisseni Center • Henrietta, New York	FloHockey	Cataldo	W 4–2	3,768	5–6–0 (4–4–0)
November 22	7:00 pm	Holy Cross		Tate Rink • West Point, New York	FloHockey	Cataldo	L 3–5	2,080	5–7–0 (4–5–0)
November 26	7:00 pm	at Stonehill*		Warrior Ice Arena • Brighton, Massachusetts	NEC Front Row	Cataldo	L 1–3	378	5–8–0
November 29	4:00 pm	at Massachusetts*		Mullins Center • Amherst, Massachusetts	ESPN+	Szary	L 1–3	3,235	5–9–0
December 3	7:00 pm	at Sacred Heart		Martire Family Arena • Fairfield, Connecticut	FloHockey	Cataldo	L 0–4	2,033	5–10–0 (4–6–0)
December 12	8:00 pm	vs. Penn State*		Capital One Arena • Washington, D. C. (Capital Hockey Classic)		Cataldo	L 1–4	3,000	5–11–0
December 28	7:00 pm	Princeton*		Tate Rink • West Point, New York	FloHockey	Cataldo	L 0–1	2,648	5–12–0
December 29	7:00 pm	Vermont*		Tate Rink • West Point, New York	FloHockey	Szary	L 0–6	1,960	5–13–0
January 3	7:00 pm	Merrimack*		Tate Rink • West Point, New York	FloHockey	Szary	L 2–5	2,179	5–14–0
January 7	7:00 pm	at American International		MassMutual Center • Springfield, Massachusetts	FloHockey	Cataldo	L 2–8	357	5–15–0 (4–7–0)
January 10	7:00 pm	Mercyhurst		Tate Rink • West Point, New York	FloHockey	Cataldo	W 9–1	1,754	6–15–0 (5–7–0)
January 11	7:00 pm	Mercyhurst		Tate Rink • West Point, New York	FloHockey	Cataldo	W 13–1	1,682	7–15–0 (6–7–0)
January 17	7:00 pm	Air Force		Tate Rink • West Point, New York (Rivalry)	FloHockey	Cataldo	W 3–2	2,498	8–15–0 (7–7–0)
January 18	4:00 pm	Air Force		Tate Rink • West Point, New York (Rivalry)	FloHockey	Cataldo	W 4–3 ^{OT}	2,569	9–15–0 (8–7–0)
January 24	7:00 pm	at Robert Morris		Clearview Arena • Moon Township, Pennsylvania	FloHockey	Cataldo	W 6–3	673	10–15–0 (9–7–0)
January 25	5:00 pm	at Robert Morris		Clearview Arena • Moon Township, Pennsylvania	FloHockey	Cataldo	W 2–0	925	11–15–0 (10–7–0)
February 1	2:00 pm	at Royal Military College*		Constantine Arena • Kingston, Ontario (Rivalry, Exhibition)		Szary	W 3–2		
February 4	7:00 pm	at Bentley		Bentley Arena • Waltham, Massachusetts	FloHockey	Cataldo	L 2–5	1,367	11–16–0 (10–8–0)
February 7	7:00 pm	Sacred Heart		Tate Rink • West Point, New York	FloHockey	Cataldo	T 2–2 ^{SOW}	2,489	11–16–1 (10–8–1)
February 8	7:00 pm	Sacred Heart		Tate Rink • West Point, New York	FloHockey	Cataldo	W 5–3	2,547	12–16–1 (11–8–1)
February 14	9:00 pm	at Air Force		Cadet Ice Arena • USAF Academy, Colorado (Rivalry)	FloHockey	Cataldo	W 2–1	2,653	13–16–1 (12–8–1)
February 15	7:00 pm	at Air Force		Cadet Ice Arena • USAF Academy, Colorado (Rivalry)	FloHockey	Cataldo	T 4–4 ^{SOW}	2,680	13–16–2 (12–8–2)
February 21	7:00 pm	at American International		MassMutual Center • Springfield, Massachusetts	FloHockey	Cataldo	L 2–3	497	13–17–2 (12–9–2)
February 22	4:00 pm	American International		Tate Rink • West Point, New York	FloHockey	Szary	W 3–2	2,604	14–17–2 (13–9–2)
Atlantic Hockey America Tournament
March 7	7:00 pm	at Niagara*		Dwyer Arena • Lewiston, New York (AHA Quarterfinal Game 1)	FloHockey	Cataldo	W 3–2 ^{2OT}	603	15–17–2
March 8	7:00 pm	at Niagara*		Dwyer Arena • Lewiston, New York (AHA Quarterfinal Game 2)	FloHockey	Cataldo	L 3–4	618	15–18–2
March 9	5:00 pm	at Niagara*		Dwyer Arena • Lewiston, New York (AHA Quarterfinal Game 3)	FloHockey	Cataldo	W 4–3 ^{OT}	608	16–18–2
March 14	7:00 pm	at Holy Cross*		Hart Center • Worcester, Massachusetts (AHA Semifinal Game 1)	FloHockey	Cataldo	L 2–3 ^{OT}	2,157	16–19–2
March 15	7:00 pm	at Holy Cross*		Hart Center • Worcester, Massachusetts (AHA Semifinal Game 2)	FloHockey	Cataldo	L 1–5	1,341	16–20–2
*Non-conference game. ^{#}Rankings from USCHO.com Poll. All times are in Eastern Time. Source:

== Scoring statistics ==
Name	Position	Games	Goals	Assists	Points	PIM
Mac Gadowsky	D	38	16	26	42	6
Barron Woodring	C	38	11	15	26	12
Jack Ivey	F	38	10	15	25	6
Nik Hong	F	36	11	11	22	10
Nils Forselius	F	35	7	15	22	18
Ben Ivey	F	37	8	13	21	10
Brent Keefer	F	36	7	12	19	29
Joey Baez	F	38	7	9	16	14
Vincent Salice	C	35	6	8	14	6
Adam Marshall	LW	34	7	5	12	33
Hunter McCoy	F	30	4	7	11	10
Michael Sacco	F	38	2	9	11	35
Pierce Patterson	D	38	2	7	7	12
Samuel Groebner	D	38	2	7	9	14
Dylan Wegner	F	34	2	4	6	16
Easton Zueger	D	36	2	3	5	28
Sean Vlasich	D	33	0	5	5	6
Jon Bell	D	27	0	4	4	14
Andrew Gilbert	D	38	0	3	3	8
Stephen Willey	LW	6	0	2	2	0
Jacob Biron	G	2	0	1	1	0
Jude Brower	D	6	1	0	1	0
J. J. Cataldo	G	31	0	1	1	0
Joey Dosan	F	1	0	0	0	0
Andrew Garby	D	2	0	0	0	12
Noah Alvarez	F	3	0	0	0	0
Josh Bohlin	F	4	0	0	0	0
Lucas Kanta	LW	5	0	0	0	2
Trevor Smith	C	7	0	0	0	0
Owen Nolan	D	8	0	0	0	10
Evan Szary	G	10	0	0	0	0
Total			105	182	287	323

== Goaltending statistics ==
Name	Games	Minutes	Wins	Losses	Ties	Goals against	Saves	Shut outs	SV %	GAA
Jacob Biron	2	35:42	0	0	0	1	12	0	.923	1.68
J. J. Cataldo	31	1817:17	14	14	2	73	858	2	.922	2.41
Evan Szary	10	461:45	2	6	0	33	236	1	.877	4.29
Empty Net	-	22:18	-	-	-	10	-	-	-	-
Total	38	2337:02	16	20	2	117	1106	3	.904	3.00

== Rankings ==
Poll	Week																											
Poll	Pre	1	2	3	4	5	6	7	8	9	10	11	12	13	14	15	16	17	18	19	20	21	22	23	24	25	26	27 (Final)
USCHO.com	NR	NR	NR	NR	NR	NR	NR	NR	NR	NR	NR	NR	–	NR	NR	NR	NR	NR	NR	NR	NR	NR	NR	NR	NR	NR	–	NR
USA Hockey	NR	NR	NR	NR	NR	NR	NR	NR	NR	NR	NR	NR	–	NR	NR	NR	NR	NR	NR	NR	NR	NR	NR	NR	NR	NR	NR	NR

Note: USCHO did not release a poll in week 12 or 26.
Note: USA Hockey did not release a poll in week 12.

== Awards and honors ==
Player	Award	Ref
Mac Gadowsky	AHCA All-American East First Team	
Mac Gadowsky	Atlantic Hockey America Best Defenseman	
Mac Gadowsky	Atlantic Hockey America Individual Sportsmanship Award	
Mac Gadowsky	All-Atlantic Hockey America First Team	
Jack Ivey	Atlantic Hockey America All-Rookie Team	
Mac Gadowsky	Atlantic Hockey America All-Tournament Team	
