= 2024–25 Canisius Golden Griffins men's ice hockey season =

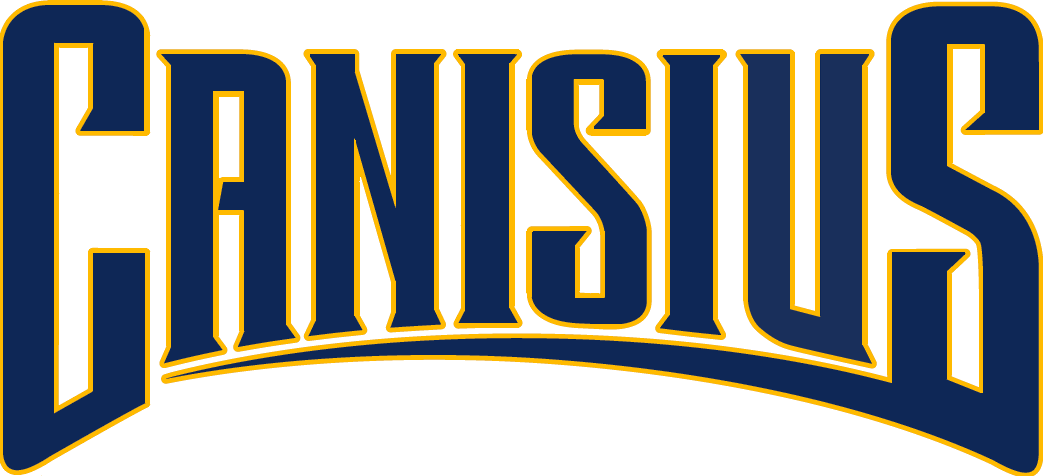
- Conference: 6th AHA
- Home ice: LECOM Harborcenter

Rankings
- USCHO: NR
- USA Hockey: NR

Record
- Overall: 12–23–2
- Conference: 11–13–2
- Home: 6–10–1
- Road: 6–13–1

Coaches and captains
- Head coach: Trevor Large
- Assistant coaches: Max Mobley; Matt Hoover
- Captain: Matt Vermaeten
- Alternate captain: Jackson Decker

The 2024–25 Canisius Golden Griffins men's ice hockey season was the 45th season of play for the program, the 27th at the Division I level, and the 1st in Atlantic Hockey America. The Golden Griffins represented Canisius College, played their home games at the LECOM Harborcenter and were coached by Trevor Large in his 8th season.

== Season ==
As did most other teams in Atlantic Hockey America, Canisius had a poor start to their season. The Golden Griffins ended up losing all eight of their non-conference games, leaving the team with only one real path to the NCAA tournament; winning the conference championship. Despite a bad stretch in December, Canisius played much better against their contemporaries and were in the top half of the standings to end the first half of their schedule.

When the season started back up after Christmas, the club continued rack up wins in conference play and were sitting in a good position at the end of January. All of that changed at the beginning February when the team lost six consecutive games (three in overtime) and tumbled down the standings. During the skid, the defense collapsed and allowed 39 shots per game. Petter Wickström Stumer did well to stop as many shots as he did but the results were not forthcoming. The team managed to find enough offense to win two of its final three games and earn a 6th-place finish but the Griffs were forced to begin their postseason run in the first round of the AHA tournament.

Ben Bonisteel, who had played in just one game since December, got the starting job against Mercyhurst but it likely wouldn't have mattered who was in goal. The Lakers were the lowest-ranked team in the nation and could only muster 16 shots on goal for the entire match, less than half of what Chanisius was able to produce. Though the offense only found the back of the net twice, it was more than enough to send the Golden Griffins into the quarterfinals. The following week, Canisius was completely held in check by Bentley's netminder and the team was unable to score in either of their two games. Bonisteel game the club a chance to win in the second game by stopping all but one of the shots he faced but the Griffs' inability to score sealed their fate.

== Departures ==
Player	Position	Nationality	Cause
Powell Connor	Defenseman	Canada	Graduation (signed with Reading Royals)
Brenden Datema	Defenseman	United States	Graduation (signed with Atlanta Gladiators)
David Fessenden	Goaltender	United States	Graduation (signed with Adirondack Thunder)
Randy Hernández	Forward	United States	Graduation (signed with Fort Wayne Komets)
Alexander Houston	Goaltender	United States	Left program (retired)
Max Kouznetsov	Forward	United States	Graduation (signed with Reading Royals)
Hudson Lambert	Defenseman	Canada	Graduation (signed with Fayetteville Marksmen)
Griffin Loughran	Forward	United States	Graduation (signed with Savannah Ghost Pirates)
Jack Lyons	Defenseman	Canada	Graduation (signed with HDD Jesenice)
David Melaragni	Defenseman	United States	Graduation (retired)
Erik Urbank	Forward	United States	Graduation (signed with Pensacola Ice Flyers)

== Recruiting ==
Player	Position	Nationality	Age	Notes
Ben Bonisteel	Goaltender	Canada	21	Fenwick, ON
Alec Cicero	Forward	United States	23	Williamsville, NY; graduate transfer from Holy Cross
Mikey Colella	Forward	United States	25	Turnersville, NJ; graduate transfer from Northern Michigan
Ryan Gillespie	Forward	Canada	21	Toronto, ON
Cole Kodsi	Forward	United States	24	Boca Raton, FL; graduate transfer from Union
Luke Marshall	Defenseman	Canada	20	Saskatoon, SK
Carter Patterson	Defenseman	Canada	20	Burlington, ON
Dominic Payne	Defenseman	Canada	19	North Vancouver, BC
Hunter Price	Defenseman	Canada	20	Calgary, AB
Kash Rasmussen	Forward	Canada	23	Cochrane, AB; transfer from Michigan Tech
Petter Wickström Stumer	Goaltender	Sweden	20	Stockholm, SWE

== Roster ==
As of August 7, 2024.

No.	Nat.	Player	Class	Pos	Height	Weight	DoB	Hometown	Previous team	NHL rights
4	(United States)	Keegan Langefels	Senior	D	6' 0" (1.83 m)	185 lb (84 kg)	2001-02-02	Eden Prairie, Minnesota	New Mexico Ice Wolves (NAHL)	—
5	(Canada)	Robert Kincaid	Junior	D	6' 2" (1.88 m)	185 lb (84 kg)	2002-05-13	Barrhead, Alberta	Maine (HEA)	—
8	(Canada)	Matteo Giampa	Sophomore	F	6' 1" (1.85 m)	190 lb (86 kg)	2003-09-03	Virgil, Ontario	Bonnyville Pontiacs (AJHL)	—
9	(United States)	Kyle Haskins	Graduate	F	6' 0" (1.83 m)	185 lb (84 kg)	2000-02-16	Huntington, Vermont	Michigan State (Big Ten)	—
12	(United States)	Luke Farthing	Graduate	D	5' 10" (1.78 m)	180 lb (82 kg)	1999-04-21	Stoutsville, Ohio	Ferris State (CCHA)	—
13	(United States)	Mikey Colella	Graduate	F	5' 7" (1.7 m)	155 lb (70 kg)	1999-06-12	Wenonah, New Jersey	Northern Michigan Wildcats (CCHA)	—
14	(Canada)	Trey Funk	Sophomore	F	6' 2" (1.88 m)	180 lb (82 kg)	2002-04-11	Redwood Meadows, Alberta	Bonnyville Pontiacs (AJHL)	—
15	(Canada)	Matt Vermaeten (C)	Senior	F	5' 10" (1.78 m)	165 lb (75 kg)	2001-01-04	Ottawa, Ontario	Shreveport Mudbugs (NAHL)	—
20	(Canada)	Ryan Gillespie	Freshman	F	6' 0" (1.83 m)	190 lb (86 kg)	2003-01-31	Toronto, Ontario	Salmon Arm Silverbacks (BCHL)	—
23	(United States)	Cooper Haar	Graduate	F	6' 3" (1.91 m)	205 lb (93 kg)	1999-04-26	Huntington Beach, California	Aberdeen Wings (NAHL)	—
24	(United States)	Jackson Decker (A)	Graduate	D	5' 11" (1.8 m)	170 lb (77 kg)	1999-03-19	Algonquin, Illinois	Chippewa Steel (NAHL)	—
25	(United States)	Jackson Nieuwendyk	Sophomore	F	6' 1" (1.85 m)	185 lb (84 kg)	2002-09-04	Dallas, Texas	Penticton Vees (BCHL)	—
26	(Switzerland)	Stefano Bottini	Junior	F	6' 0" (1.83 m)	180 lb (82 kg)	2002-05-03	Lugano, Switzerland	Penticton Vees (BCHL)	—
27	(Canada)	Dominic Payne	Freshman	D	6' 1" (1.85 m)	176 lb (80 kg)	2004-12-08	North Vancouver, British Columbia	Sherwood Park Crusaders (BCHL)	—
30	(Canada)	Ethan Robertson	Sophomore	G	6' 1" (1.85 m)	175 lb (79 kg)	2002-02-22	Courtice, Ontario	Austin Bruins (NAHL)	—
33	(Sweden)	Petter Wickström Stumer	Freshman	G	6' 6" (1.98 m)	203 lb (92 kg)	2004-09-03	Stockholm, Sweden	Northeast Generals (NAHL)	—
37	(Canada)	Hunter Andrew	Junior	F	6' 0" (1.83 m)	165 lb (75 kg)	2002-10-25	Virden, Manitoba	Powell River Kings (BCHL)	—
41	(Canada)	Ben Bonisteel	Freshman	G	6' 3" (1.91 m)	207 lb (94 kg)	2004-04-04	Saskatoon, Saskatchewan	Trenton Golden Hawks (OJHL)	—
44	(Canada)	Luke Marshall	Freshman	D	6' 0" (1.83 m)	170 lb (77 kg)	2003-06-20	Fenwick, Ontario	Brooks Bandits (BCHL)	—
47	(United States)	Grant Porter	Junior	F	5' 11" (1.8 m)	180 lb (82 kg)	2002-02-21	Weston, Massachusetts	Providence (HEA)	—
53	(Canada)	Jack Budd	Sophomore	D	6' 2" (1.88 m)	190 lb (86 kg)	2003-08-29	Toronto, Ontario	Bonnyville Pontiacs (AJHL)	—
55	(Canada)	Christian MacDougall	Junior	F	6' 0" (1.83 m)	180 lb (82 kg)	2001-03-13	Toronto, Ontario	Coquitlam Express (BCHL)	—
57	(Canada)	Carter Patterson	Freshman	D	6' 4" (1.93 m)	201 lb (91 kg)	2003-11-13	Burlington, Ontario	Blackfalds Bulldogs (BCHL)	—
61	(Canada)	Hunter Price	Freshman	F	6' 1" (1.85 m)	194 lb (88 kg)	2003-10-25	Calgary, Alberta	Sherwood Park Crusaders (BCHL)	—
72	(United States)	Alec Cicero	Graduate	F	5' 10" (1.78 m)	180 lb (82 kg)	2001-03-09	Williamsville, New York	Holy Cross (AHA)	—
73	(Canada)	Cody Schiavon	Graduate	D	6' 0" (1.83 m)	200 lb (91 kg)	2000-07-01	West Kelowna, British Columbia	Vermont (HEA)	—
77	(Canada)	Kash Rasmussen	Junior	F	6' 2" (1.88 m)	170 lb (77 kg)	2001-04-20	Cochrane, Alberta	Michigan Tech (CCHA)	—
88	(United States)	Killian Kiecker-Olson	Junior	F	6' 1" (1.85 m)	195 lb (88 kg)	2001-01-19	Andover, Minnesota	Maine (HEA)	—
91	(Canada)	Alton McDermott	Senior	F	5' 10" (1.78 m)	175 lb (79 kg)	2001-06-04	Oakville, Ontario	Oakville Blades (OJHL)	—
92	(Canada)	Oliver Tarr	Junior	F	6' 0" (1.83 m)	185 lb (84 kg)	2002-01-20	Uxbridge, Ontario	Haliburton County Huskies (OJHL)	—
94	(United States)	Cole Kodsi	Graduate	F	6' 2" (1.88 m)	200 lb (91 kg)	2000-06-17	Delray Beach, Florida	Union (ECAC)	—

== Standings ==
2024–25 Atlantic Hockey America Standings
	Conference record										Overall record					
	GP	W	L	T	OW	OL	SW	PTS	GF	GA	GP	W	L	T	GF	GA
Holy Cross †	26	19	5	2	4	0	1	56	92	47	40	24	14	2	130	94
Sacred Heart	26	16	7	3	1	1	2	53	80	64	39	21	13	5	118	101
#19 Bentley *	26	16	9	1	1	2	1	51	79	57	40	23	15	2	115	83
Niagara	26	15	9	2	3	3	1	48	90	70	37	18	16	3	124	109
Army	26	14	10	2	2	0	2	44	84	74	38	16	20	2	105	117
Canisius	26	11	13	2	0	3	0	38	84	79	37	12	23	2	98	120
Air Force	26	11	13	2	2	3	1	37	59	58	40	16	21	3	86	112
American International	26	9	16	1	0	3	0	31	63	77	38	13	23	2	92	117
RIT	26	9	15	2	2	0	1	28	65	102	35	10	23	2	82	133
Robert Morris	26	7	15	4	1	2	1	27	72	86	35	10	20	5	95	115
Mercyhurst	26	4	19	3	1	0	2	16	59	113	35	4	27	4	77	150
Championship: March 22, 2025 † indicates conference regular season champion (DeGregorio Trophy) * indicates conference tournament champion (Riley Trophy); Rankings: USCHO.com Top 20 Poll

== Schedule and results ==
Date	Time	Opponent^{#}	Rank^{#}	Site	TV	Decision	Result	Attendance	Record
Regular Season
October 5	7:00 pm	at Clarkson*		Cheel Arena • Potsdam, New York	ESPN+	Robertson	L 1–2	3,030	0–1–0
October 6	4:00 pm	at St. Lawrence*		Appleton Arena • Canton, New York	ESPN+	Robertson	L 2–5	1,079	0–2–0
October 11	7:00 pm	Rensselaer*		LECOM Harborcenter • Buffalo, New York	FloHockey	Robertson	L 3–6	901	0–3–0
October 12	5:00 pm	Rensselaer*		LECOM Harborcenter • Buffalo, New York	FloHockey	Bonisteel	L 3–8	538	0–4–0
October 22	6:00 pm	Mercyhurst		LECOM Harborcenter • Buffalo, New York	FloHockey	Robertson	W 6–3	489	1–4–0 (1–0–0)
October 25	7:00 pm	#4 Michigan State*		LECOM Harborcenter • Buffalo, New York	FloHockey	Robertson	L 0–3	1,729	1–5–0
October 26	7:00 pm	#4 Michigan State*		LECOM Harborcenter • Buffalo, New York	FloHockey	Wickström Stumer	L 1–4	1,604	1–6–0
November 1	6:00 pm	Army		LECOM Harborcenter • Buffalo, New York	FloHockey	Robertson	W 4–0	485	2–6–0 (2–0–0)
November 2	6:00 pm	Army		LECOM Harborcenter • Buffalo, New York	FloHockey	Robertson	W 6–1	1,029	3–6–0 (3–0–0)
November 8	9:05 pm	at Air Force		Cadet Ice Arena • USAF Academy, Colorado	FloHockey, Altitude 2	Robertson	L 0–2	635	3–7–0 (3–1–0)
November 9	3:05 pm	at Air Force		Cadet Ice Arena • USAF Academy, Colorado	FloHockey, Altitude	Bonisteel	L 1–2	1,387	3–8–0 (3–2–0)
November 22	7:00 pm	at Mercyhurst		Mercyhurst Ice Center • Erie, Pennsylvania	FloHockey	Robertson	W 3–2	1,257	4–8–0 (4–2–0)
November 23	5:00 pm	at Mercyhurst		Mercyhurst Ice Center • Erie, Pennsylvania	FloHockey	Wickström Stumer	T 3–3 ^{SOL}	1,237	4–8–1 (4–2–1)
December 3	7:05 pm	at RIT		Gene Polisseni Center • Henrietta, New York	FloHockey	Bonisteel	W 6–4	1,923	5–8–1 (5–2–1)
December 6	7:00 pm	Sacred Heart		LECOM Harborcenter • Buffalo, New York	FloHockey	Bonisteel	L 2–4	776	5–9–1 (5–3–1)
December 7	6:00 pm	Sacred Heart		LECOM Harborcenter • Buffalo, New York	FloHockey	Wickström Stumer	T 3–3 ^{SOL}	752	5–9–2 (5–3–2)
December 14	1:00 pm	Robert Morris		LECOM Harborcenter • Buffalo, New York	FloHockey	Wickström Stumer	L 2–5	992	5–10–2 (5–4–2)
December 15	4:00 pm	Robert Morris		LECOM Harborcenter • Buffalo, New York	FloHockey	Bonisteel	L 1–3	528	5–11–2 (5–5–2)
January 10	7:00 pm	RIT		LECOM Harborcenter • Buffalo, New York	FloHockey	Robertson	W 5–2	855	6–11–2 (6–5–2)
January 11	7:00 pm	RIT		LECOM Harborcenter • Buffalo, New York	FloHockey	Robertson	W 5–2	1,064	7–11–2 (7–5–2)
January 17	7:00 pm	at Penn State*		Pegula Ice Arena • University Park, Pennsylvania		Robertson	L 0–4	6,310	7–12–2
January 18	5:00 pm	at Penn State*		Pegula Ice Arena • University Park, Pennsylvania		Wickström Stumer	L 2–3	6,573	7–13–2
January 24	1:00 pm	at American International		MassMutual Center • Springfield, Massachusetts	FloHockey	Robertson	W 4–2	108	8–13–2 (8–5–2)
January 25	5:00 pm	at American International		MassMutual Center • Springfield, Massachusetts	FloHockey	Robertson	L 2–3	287	8–14–2 (8–6–2)
January 28	7:00 pm	at Robert Morris		Clearview Arena • Neville Township, Pennsylvania	FloHockey	Wickström Stumer	W 4–2	532	9–14–2 (9–6–2)
February 1	7:00 pm	at Holy Cross		Hart Center • Worcester, Massachusetts	FloHockey	Wickström Stumer	L 2–3 ^{OT}	1,372	9–15–2 (9–7–2)
February 2	3:00 pm	at Holy Cross		Hart Center • Worcester, Massachusetts	FloHockey, NESN	Wickström Stumer	L 1–4	953	9–16–2 (9–8–2)
February 7	7:00 pm	Air Force		LECOM Harborcenter • Buffalo, New York	FloHockey	Wickström Stumer	L 3–5	683	9–17–2 (9–9–2)
February 8	4:00 pm	Air Force		LECOM Harborcenter • Buffalo, New York	FloHockey	Wickström Stumer	L 2–3 ^{OT}	972	9–18–2 (9–10–2)
February 11	7:00 pm	at Niagara		Dwyer Arena • Lewiston, New York (Rivalry)	FloHockey	Wickström Stumer	L 2–6	889	9–19–2 (9–11–2)
February 14	7:00 pm	at Bentley		Bentley Arena • Waltham, Massachusetts	FloHockey	Wickström Stumer	L 3–4 ^{OT}	1,145	9–20–2 (9–12–2)
February 15	4:00 pm	at Bentley		Bentley Arena • Waltham, Massachusetts	FloHockey	Wickström Stumer	W 5–3	1,407	10–20–2 (10–12–2)
February 21	7:00 pm	Niagara		LECOM Harborcenter • Buffalo, New York (Rivalry)	FloHockey	Wickström Stumer	L 3–6	1,492	10–21–2 (10–13–2)
February 22	7:00 pm	at Niagara		Dwyer Arena • Lewiston, New York (Rivalry)	FloHockey	Bonisteel	W 6–2	1,649	11–21–2 (11–13–2)
Atlantic Hockey America Tournament
March 1	5:00 pm	Mercyhurst*		LECOM Harborcenter • Buffalo, New York (AHA First Round)	FloHockey	Bonisteel	W 2–0	293	12–21–2
March 7	7:00 pm	at Bentley*		Bentley Arena • Waltham, Massachusetts (AHA Quarterfinal Game 1)	FloHockey	Bonisteel	L 0–4	1,389	12–22–2
March 8	7:00 pm	at Bentley*		Bentley Arena • Waltham, Massachusetts (AHA Quarterfinal Game 2)	FloHockey	Bonisteel	L 0–2	1,204	12–23–2
*Non-conference game. ^{#}Rankings from USCHO.com Poll. All times are in Eastern Time. Source:

== Scoring statistics ==
Name	Position	Games	Goals	Assists	Points	PIM
Matteo Giampa	RW	37	8	22	30	10
Kyle Haskins	F	37	11	12	23	24
Alec Cicero	F	34	8	9	17	33
Trey Funk	F	37	8	9	17	23
Grant Porter	F	33	10	5	15	12
Oliver Tarr	RW	30	8	7	15	8
Alton McDermott	RW	33	7	8	15	6
Dominic Payne	D	37	6	8	14	14
Jackson Decker	D	34	1	12	13	16
Cole Kodsi	LW	31	4	8	12	8
Michael Colella	F	37	4	8	12	6
Jack Budd	D	28	1	10	11	12
Matthew Vermaeten	F	35	4	4	8	2
Kash Rasmussen	F	14	2	6	8	6
Robert Kincaid	F	24	2	4	6	0
Killian Kiecker-Olson	C	22	3	2	5	6
Luke Farthing	D	15	1	4	5	10
Carter Patterson	D	28	1	4	5	31
Stefano Bottini	LW/RW	33	3	1	4	23
Hunter Andrew	F	16	2	1	3	6
Jackson Nieuwendyk	F	22	1	2	3	6
Cody Schiavon	D	34	2	0	2	24
Luke Marshall	D	23	1	1	2	6
Cooper Haar	LW	9	0	2	2	4
Ethan Robertson	G	20	0	1	1	0
Ryan Gillespie	RW	1	0	0	0	0
Christian MacDougall	F	1	0	0	0	17
Keegan Langefels	D	4	0	0	0	0
Ben Bonisteel	G	11	0	0	0	0
Petter Wickström Stumer	G	15	0	0	0	0
Hunter Price	F	16	0	0	0	4
Total			98	150	248	331

== Goaltending statistics ==
Name	Games	Minutes	Wins	Losses	Ties	Goals Against	Saves	Shut Outs	SV %	GAA
Ethan Robertson	20	899:37	7	7	0	37	387	1	.913	2.47
Ben Bonisteel	12	522:33	3	6	0	27	226	1	.893	3.10
Petter Wickström Stumer	15	783:01	2	10	2	46	431	0	.904	3.52
Empty Net	-	31:45	-	-	-	10	-	-	-	-
Total	37	2236:56	12	23	2	120	1044	2	.897	3.22

== Rankings ==
Poll	Week																											
Poll	Pre	1	2	3	4	5	6	7	8	9	10	11	12	13	14	15	16	17	18	19	20	21	22	23	24	25	26	27 (Final)
USCHO.com	NR	NR	NR	NR	NR	NR	NR	NR	NR	NR	NR	NR	–	NR	NR	NR	NR	NR	NR	NR	NR	NR	NR	NR	NR	NR	–	NR
USA Hockey	NR	NR	NR	NR	NR	NR	NR	NR	NR	NR	NR	NR	–	NR	NR	NR	NR	NR	NR	NR	NR	NR	NR	NR	NR	NR	NR	NR

Note: USCHO did not release a poll in week 12 or 26.
Note: USA Hockey did not release a poll in week 12.

== Awards and honors ==
Player	Award	Ref
Matteo Giampa	All-Atlantic Hockey America Second Team	
Dominic Payne	Atlantic Hockey America All-Rookie Team	
