= 2024–25 Sacred Heart Pioneers men's ice hockey season =

- Conference: 2nd AHA
- Home ice: Martire Family Arena

Rankings
- USCHO: NR
- USA Hockey: NR

Record
- Overall: 21–13–5
- Conference: 16–7–3
- Home: 13–8–2
- Road: 8–5–3

Coaches and captains
- Head coach: C. J. Marottolo
- Assistant coaches: Scott McDougall; Steve Bergin; Chris Azzano
- Captain: Hunter Sansbury
- Alternate captain(s): Mikey Adamson; Tyler Ghirardosi

The 2024–25 Sacred Heart Pioneers men's ice hockey season was the 32nd season of play for the program, the 27th at the Division I level and the 1st in Atlantic Hockey America. The Pioneers represented Sacred Heart University in the 2024–25 NCAA Division I men's ice hockey season, played their home games at the Martire Family Arena and were coached by C. J. Marottolo in his 16th season.

== Season ==
Sacred Heart kicked off the season the rather well, all things considered. The Pioneers were able to grab a win over ranked Massachusetts and though they were unable to beat Colgate in the opening series, both games went into overtime. However, when they got into conference play at the end of the month, their decent start went to pot. After splitting a series with Holy Cross, the team was lit up by Bentley the following week. Cullen DeYoung, who had played well in goal to that point, allowed 6 goals on 33 shots over four periods before being yanked in favor of freshman Ajeet Gundarah, a move that would prove fortuitous for the Pioneers.

After finishing the weekend, Gundarah got the start against Mercyhurst and swiftly settled into the role. After winning his first five career starts, the BC-native had a bit of a hiccup in the team rematch with Holy Cross but he got back into his stride afterwards and backstopped the team to a fantastic finish for the first half of the season. With the offense producing more often than not, Sacred Heart put themselves in a good position by the time the winter break rolled around. While the addition of Maine transfers Félix Trudeau and Reid Pabich paid dividends for the club, it was Gundarah who stole the show for the Pioneers.

The team made a splash after they resumed play by downing tournament-hopeful Cornell and rising up into the top half of the PairWise rankings. The Connecticut Ice tournament gave them one final chance to prove their mettle against non-conference opponents and they started with a big win over Yale. With DeYoung back in goal, the Pioneers throttled the Bulldogs 8–2 before taking on their toughest opponent of the season, Connecticut. In front of a packed home crowd, the team did everything they could to defeat the tournament-bound Huskies. One goal leaked through DeYoung in the first period but he was able to turn aside all other attempts as the defense insulated him to the tune of just 17 shots against. Unfortunately, the offense had trouble penetrating the UConn zone and could only get 23 chances themselves, none of which were able to find the back of the net.

While the loss to Connecticut dropped Sacred Heart 10 spots in the rankings, it was unlikely that the team would have been able to get into an at-large position had they won due to how poorly the rest of the conference had performed in their non-conference play. With Gundarah back between the pipes the following week, the team polished off the rest of its schedule and finished just behind Holy Cross for second place in Atlantic Hockey America. Their position assured them a bye into the quarterfinal round and home games through at least the semifinal round.

After a week off, Sacred Heart began its postseason against notoriously difficult Air Force. Opening with a solid 4–1 win, the Pioneers found themselves in a dogfight with the Falcons and the rematch went late into the evening. Gundarah found himself under siege by the relentless Air Force attack that launched 58 shots on the SHU goal. Just before the end of the second overtime period, the Falcons got a luck break when a point shot was deflect and it arced over everyone and into the goal. In the deciding game, Gundarah received much more help from the offense and defense and was able to keep Air Force off of the score sheet until just 70 seconds remained on the clock. By that time, SHU had scored 4 goals and were able to advance to the conference semifinals for the first time in 15 years.

Riding high by that point, Sacred Heart began the series with Bentley by scoring the first two goals of the game. Taking their lead well into the second period, the Pioneers then got into penalty trouble when Hunter Sansbury was called for a 5-minute major. The Falcons scored twice on the man-advantage to tie the match and then carried the momentum into the third where they netted three more to run away with the game. With their backs against the wall, Sacred Heart was again forced to kill off a major penalty, this time to Cole Galata, but Gundarah came up big and stopped 33 of 34 shots that he faced in the game. However, Bentley's goalkeeper was able to blank SHU to preserve a 1–0 lead until late into the game. After the Pioneers were forced to pull Gundarah for an extra attacker, Bentley collected two empty-net goal to seal the game and end Sacred Heart's season.

During the year, the Pioneers had tied the program record with 21 wins but it was Ajeet Gundarah who proved to be the stand-out for the year. The goaltender was one of the few players of Indian-descent to ever play college hockey. More than that, however, he joined a select list of ethnic minorities who became stars for the college game such as George Chin, Paul Kariya and Anson Carter.

== Departures ==
Player	Position	Nationality	Cause
Grant Anderson	Defenseman	United States	Graduation (retired)
Mark Cheremeta	Forward	United States	Graduation (signed with Kalamazoo Wings)
Chase Clark	Goaltender	United States	Transferred to American International
Blake Dangos	Defenseman	United States	Transferred to American International
Dante Fantauzzi	Defenseman	Canada	Graduation (signed with Bloomington Bison)
Chikara Hanzawa	Forward	Japan	Signed professional contract (HL Anyang)
Blake Humphrey	Forward	United States	Transferred to Lake Superior State
Conner Hutchison	Defenseman	United States	Graduate transfer to Miami
Liam Izyk	Forward	Canada	Graduation (signed with Rovaniemen Kiekko)
Andrius Kulbis-Marino	Defenseman	United States	Graduate transfer to Long Island
Kevin Lombardi	Forward	United States	Graduation (signed with Orlando Solar Bears)
Dylan Robbins	Forward	United States	Transferred to Massachusetts Boston
Justin Robbins	Goaltender	United States	Graduation (signed with Tahoe Knight Monsters)
Tyler Spott	Defenseman	Canada	Graduation (retired)
Braeden Tuck	Forward	Canada	Graduation (signed with Norfolk Admirals)
T. J. Walsh	Forward	United States	Graduation (signed with Orlando Solar Bears)

== Recruiting ==
Player	Position	Nationality	Age	Notes
Luke Amell	Defenseman/Forward	United States	21	Mars, PA
Gabe Blanchard	Defenseman	United States	24	Buffalo, NY; transfer from Massachusetts Lowell
Max Dorrington	Forward	United States	23	North Reading, MA; graduate transfer from St. Lawrence
John Driscoll	Defenseman	United States	23	Eagle, ID; transfer from Army
William Gendron	Forward	Canada	21	Boisbriand, QC
Tyler Ghirardosi	Forward	Canada	24	Montrose, BC; graduate transfer from Holy Cross
Matthew Guerra	Forward	United States	25	Orlando, FL; graduate transfer from Holy Cross
Ajeet Gundarah	Goaltender	Canada	21	Richmond, BC
Jacob Hewitt	Forward	United States	22	Ashburnham, MA; transfer from Army
Vitaly Levyy	Forward	United States	21	Old Brookville, NY
Paul Minnehan	Forward	Canada	21	Cypress, CA
Cole O'Donnell	Goaltender	United States	21	Rochester, NY
Reid Pabich	Forward	United States	22	Verona, WI; transfer from Maine
Michael Rubin	Defenseman	United States	21	Blauvelt, NY
Jack Spicer	Goaltneder	United States	21	Rockville, MD; joined mid-season
Charles-Edward Tardif	Forward	Canada	21	Quebec City, QC
Jérémi Tremblay	Forward	Canada	21	Quebec City, QC
Félix Trudeau	Forward	Canada	22	Terrebonne, QC; transfer from Maine
Aiden VanRooyan	Defenseman	United States	21	Dakota Dunes, SD

== Roster ==
As of January 1, 2025.

No.	Nat.	Player	Class	Pos	Height	Weight	DoB	Hometown	Previous team	NHL rights
1	(United States)	Jack O'Dea	Senior	G	5' 9" (1.75 m)	148 lb (67 kg)	2000-09-07	Brighton, Massachusetts	Bridgton Academy (USHS–ME)	—
2	(United States)	Aiden VanRooyan	Freshman	D	6' 2" (1.88 m)	201 lb (91 kg)	2003-04-20	Dakota Dunes, South Dakota	Des Moines Buccaneers (USHL)	—
3	(United States)	Paul Minnehan	Freshman	F	6' 1" (1.85 m)	172 lb (78 kg)	2003-04-09	Cypress, California	Des Moines Buccaneers (USHL)	—
4	(United States)	John Driscoll	Junior	D	6' 4" (1.93 m)	205 lb (93 kg)	2001-08-19	Eagle, Idaho	Army (AHA)	—
5	(United States)	Luke Amell	Freshman	D/F	6' 4" (1.93 m)	205 lb (93 kg)	2003-09-02	Mars, Pennsylvania	Maryland Black Bears (NAHL)	—
6	(United States)	Mikey Adamson (A)	Junior	D	5' 9" (1.75 m)	170 lb (77 kg)	2001-08-16	Quincy, Massachusetts	Massachusetts (HEA)	—
7	(United States)	Garrett Sundquist	Senior	D	6' 3" (1.91 m)	205 lb (93 kg)	2001-07-17	South Glastonbury, Connecticut	Providence (HEA)	—
8	(United States)	Hunter Sansbury (C)	Senior	D	5' 11" (1.8 m)	180 lb (82 kg)	2000-10-08	Lomita, California	Salmon Arm Silverbacks (BCHL)	—
9	(Canada)	Daniel Ebrahim	Senior	F	5' 11" (1.8 m)	180 lb (82 kg)	2000-07-12	Brooklin, Ontario	Jersey Hitmen (NCDC)	—
10	(Canada)	Rylee Hlusiak	Sophomore	F	5' 10" (1.78 m)	175 lb (79 kg)	2002-06-03	Barrie, Ontario	West Kelowna Warriors (BCHL)	—
11	(United States)	Jake Hewitt	Sophomore	F	5' 10" (1.78 m)	180 lb (82 kg)	2002-07-05	Ashburnham, Massachusetts	Army (AHA)	—
12	(Canada)	William Gendron	Freshman	F	5' 10" (1.78 m)	181 lb (82 kg)	2003-07-01	Boisbriand, Quebec	Chilliwack Chiefs (BCHL)	—
14	(Canada)	Brendan Kennette	Junior	D	6' 2" (1.88 m)	190 lb (86 kg)	2002-06-09	Windsor, Ontario	Brooks Bandits (AJHL)	—
17	(Canada)	Tyler Ghirardosi (A)	Graduate	F	6' 3" (1.91 m)	185 lb (84 kg)	1999-10-01	Montrose, British Columbia	Holy Cross (AHA)	—
18	(United States)	John Jaworski	Graduate	F	5' 10" (1.78 m)	165 lb (75 kg)	2000-03-20	Grinnell, Iowa	Chicago Steel (USHL)	—
19	(United States)	Jake Bongo	Sophomore	F	5' 10" (1.78 m)	170 lb (77 kg)	2002-02-04	Ridgefield, Connecticut	Surrey Eagles (BCHL)	—
21	(United States)	Brendan Dumas	Sophomore	F	5' 10" (1.78 m)	185 lb (84 kg)	2002-08-28	North Attleborough, Massachusetts	New Jersey Jr. Titans (NAHL)	—
24	(United States)	Michael Rubin	Freshman	D	6' 1" (1.85 m)	183 lb (83 kg)	2003-05-05	Blauvelt, New York	Coquitlam Express (BCHL)	—
25	(Canada)	Jérémi Tremblay	Freshman	F	6' 1" (1.85 m)	190 lb (86 kg)	2003-01-01	Quebec City, Quebec	Maryland Black Bears (NAHL)	—
27	(Canada)	Cole Galata	Sophomore	F	5' 10" (1.78 m)	175 lb (79 kg)	2002-03-18	Barrie, Ontario	Surrey Eagles (BCHL)	—
28	(Canada)	Marcus Joughin	Junior	F	5' 11" (1.8 m)	180 lb (82 kg)	2001-07-05	Tecumseh, Ontario	West Kelowna Warriors (BCHL)	—
29	(United States)	Vitaly Levyy	Freshman	F	5' 11" (1.8 m)	170 lb (77 kg)	2003-05-09	Old Brookville, New York	Langley Rivermen (BCHL)	—
30	(United States)	Jack Spicer	Freshman	G	6' 1" (1.85 m)	185 lb (84 kg)	2004-04-28	Rockville, Maryland	Lone Star Brahmas (NAHL)	—
37	(United States)	Max Dorrington	Graduate	F	6' 3" (1.91 m)	220 lb (100 kg)	2001-08-30	North Reading, Massachusetts	St. Lawrence (ECAC)	—
39	(United States)	Cullen DeYoung	Sophomore	G	5' 10" (1.78 m)	165 lb (75 kg)	2002-02-03	Canton, Michigan	Northeast Generals (NAHL)	—
42	(Canada)	Ajeet Gundarah	Freshman	G	5' 10" (1.78 m)	181 lb (82 kg)	2003-05-09	Richmond, British Columbia	Surrey Eagles (BCHL)	—
53	(United States)	Matt Guerra	Graduate	F	5' 8" (1.73 m)	165 lb (75 kg)	1999-05-21	Orlando, Florida	Holy Cross (AHA)	—
72	(United States)	Cole O'Donnell	Freshman	G	6' 1" (1.85 m)	181 lb (82 kg)	2003-08-14	Rochester, New York	Rochester Jr. Americans (NAHL)	—
77	(Canada)	Félix Trudeau	Junior	F	6' 2" (1.88 m)	189 lb (86 kg)	2002-09-24	Terrebonne, Quebec	Maine (HEA)	—
78	(United States)	Gabe Blanchard	Senior	D	6' 0" (1.83 m)	195 lb (88 kg)	2000-09-15	East Aurora, New York	Massachusetts Lowell (HEA)	—
86	(Canada)	Charles-Edward Tardif	Freshman	F	6' 0" (1.83 m)	201 lb (91 kg)	2003-03-03	Quebec City, Quebec	Maine Nordiques (NAHL)	—
91	(United States)	Reid Pabich	Junior	F	5' 11" (1.8 m)	175 lb (79 kg)	2001-10-05	Verona, Wisconsin	Maine (HEA)	—

== Standings ==
2024–25 Atlantic Hockey America Standings
	Conference record										Overall record					
	GP	W	L	T	OW	OL	SW	PTS	GF	GA	GP	W	L	T	GF	GA
Holy Cross †	26	19	5	2	4	0	1	56	92	47	40	24	14	2	130	94
Sacred Heart	26	16	7	3	1	1	2	53	80	64	39	21	13	5	118	101
#19 Bentley *	26	16	9	1	1	2	1	51	79	57	40	23	15	2	115	83
Niagara	26	15	9	2	3	3	1	48	90	70	37	18	16	3	124	109
Army	26	14	10	2	2	0	2	44	84	74	38	16	20	2	105	117
Canisius	26	11	13	2	0	3	0	38	84	79	37	12	23	2	98	120
Air Force	26	11	13	2	2	3	1	37	59	58	40	16	21	3	86	112
American International	26	9	16	1	0	3	0	31	63	77	38	13	23	2	92	117
RIT	26	9	15	2	2	0	1	28	65	102	35	10	23	2	82	133
Robert Morris	26	7	15	4	1	2	1	27	72	86	35	10	20	5	95	115
Mercyhurst	26	4	19	3	1	0	2	16	59	113	35	4	27	4	77	150
Championship: March 22, 2025 † indicates conference regular season champion (DeGregorio Trophy) * indicates conference tournament champion (Riley Trophy); Rankings: USCHO.com Top 20 Poll

== Schedule and results ==
Date	Time	Opponent^{#}	Rank^{#}	Site	TV	Decision	Result	Attendance	Record
Exhibition
October 5	2:00 pm	at Merrimack*		J. Thom Lawler Rink • North Andover, Massachusetts (Exhibition)	ESPN+	DeYoung	L 2–3	1,974	
October 6	4:00 pm	Simon Fraser*		Martire Family Arena • Fairfield, Connecticut (Exhibition)	FloHockey	O'Donnell	W 7–3	750	
Regular Season
October 11	7:00 pm	at Colgate*		Class of 1965 Arena • Hamilton, New York	ESPN+	DeYoung	L 5–6 ^{OT}	805	0–1–0
October 12	4:00 pm	at Colgate*		Class of 1965 Arena • Hamilton, New York	ESPN+	DeYoung	T 3–3 ^{OT}	745	0–1–1
October 18	7:00 pm	at #15 Massachusetts*		Mullins Center • Amherst, Massachusetts	ESPN+	DeYoung	W 4–3	6,022	1–1–1
October 19	7:00 pm	#15 Massachusetts*		Martire Family Arena • Fairfield, Connecticut	FloHockey	DeYoung	L 1–6	3,940	1–2–1
October 25	7:00 pm	Holy Cross		Martire Family Arena • Fairfield, Connecticut	FloHockey	DeYoung	L 1–2 ^{OT}	2,579	1–3–1 (0–1–0)
October 26	7:00 pm	Holy Cross		Martire Family Arena • Fairfield, Connecticut	FloHockey	DeYoung	W 2–1	2,448	2–3–1 (1–1–0)
November 1	7:00 pm	at Bentley		Bentley Arena • Waltham, Massachusetts	FloHockey	DeYoung	L 2–4	1,100	2–4–1 (1–2–0)
November 2	7:00 pm	Bentley		Martire Family Arena • Fairfield, Connecticut	FloHockey	Gundarah	L 4–6	2,229	2–5–1 (1–3–0)
November 8	7:00 pm	at Mercyhurst		Mercyhurst Ice Center • Erie, Pennsylvania	FloHockey	Gundarah	W 4–3	1,290	3–5–1 (2–3–0)
November 9	4:00 pm	at Mercyhurst		Mercyhurst Ice Center • Erie, Pennsylvania	FloHockey	Gundarah	W 4–1	1,362	4–5–1 (3–3–0)
November 15	7:00 pm	Robert Morris		Martire Family Arena • Fairfield, Connecticut	FloHockey	Gundarah	W 4–2	2,199	5–5–1 (4–3–0)
November 16	4:00 pm	Robert Morris		Martire Family Arena • Fairfield, Connecticut	FloHockey	Gundarah	W 6–3	2,746	6–5–1 (5–3–0)
November 22	7:00 pm	RIT		Martire Family Arena • Fairfield, Connecticut	FloHockey	Gundarah	W 3–2	2,505	7–5–1 (6–3–0)
November 23	7:00 pm	RIT		Martire Family Arena • Fairfield, Connecticut	FloHockey	Gundarah	T 3–3 ^{SOW}	2,910	7–5–2 (6–3–1)
November 29	7:00 pm	at Holy Cross		Hart Center • Worcester, Massachusetts	FloHockey	Gundarah	L 1–6	771	7–6–2 (6–4–1)
November 30	7:00 pm	at Holy Cross		Hart Center • Worcester, Massachusetts	FloHockey, NESN+	DeYoung	L 1–4	922	7–7–2 (6–5–1)
December 3	7:00 pm	Army		Martire Family Arena • Fairfield, Connecticut	FloHockey	Gundarah	W 4–0	2,033	8–7–2 (7–5–1)
December 6	7:00 pm	at Canisius		LECOM Harborcenter • Buffalo, New York	FloHockey	Gundarah	W 4–2	776	9–7–2 (8–5–1)
December 7	6:00 pm	at Canisius		LECOM Harborcenter • Buffalo, New York	FloHockey	DeYoung	T 3–3 ^{SOW}	752	9–7–3 (8–5–2)
December 28	1:00 pm	at American International		MassMutual Center • Springfield, Massachusetts	FloHockey	Gundarah	W 4–1	187	10–7–3 (9–5–2)
January 3	7:00 pm	Air Force		Martire Family Arena • Fairfield, Connecticut	FloHockey	Gundarah	W 3–0	1,954	11–7–3 (10–5–2)
January 4	5:00 pm	Air Force		Martire Family Arena • Fairfield, Connecticut	FloHockey	Gundarah	L 0–3	3,008	11–8–3 (10–6–2)
January 10	7:00 pm	#18 Cornell*		Martire Family Arena • Fairfield, Connecticut	FloHockey	Gundarah	T 1–1 ^{OT}	2,930	11–8–4
January 11	5:00 pm	#18 Cornell*		Martire Family Arena • Fairfield, Connecticut	FloHockey	Gundarah	W 4–2	3,266	12–8–4
January 17	7:00 pm	American International		Martire Family Arena • Fairfield, Connecticut	FloHockey	DeYoung	W 5–2	2,566	13–8–4 (11–6–2)
January 18	7:00 pm	American International		Martire Family Arena • Fairfield, Connecticut	FloHockey	DeYoung	W 6–3	3,112	14–8–4 (12–6–2)
Connecticut Ice
January 24	7:30 pm	Yale*		Martire Family Arena • Fairfield, Connecticut (Connecticut Ice Semifinal)	SNY	DeYoung	W 8–2	4,002	15–8–4
January 25	7:30 pm	#13 Connecticut*		Martire Family Arena • Fairfield, Connecticut (Connecticut Ice Championship)	SNY	DeYoung	L 0–1	4,177	15–9–4
January 31	7:00 pm	at Niagara		Dwyer Arena • Lewiston, New York	FloHockey	Gundarah	W 3–2	691	16–9–4 (13–6–2)
February 1	5:00 pm	at Niagara		Dwyer Arena • Lewiston, New York	FloHockey	Gundarah	W 3–2 ^{OT}	694	17–9–4 (14–6–2)
February 7	7:00 pm	at Army		Tate Rink • West Point, New York	FloHockey	Gundarah	T 2–2 ^{SOL}	2,489	17–9–5 (14–6–3)
February 8	4:00 pm	at Army		Tate Rink • West Point, New York	FloHockey	Gundarah	L 3–5	2,547	17–10–5 (14–7–3)
February 18	7:00 pm	at American International		MassMutual Center • Springfield, Massachusetts	FloHockey	Gundarah	W 3–2	151	18–10–5 (15–7–3)
February 22	6:00 pm	Bentley		Martire Family Arena • Fairfield, Connecticut	FloHockey	Gundarah	W 2–0	3,733	19–10–5 (16–7–3)
Atlantic Hockey America Tournament
March 7	7:00 pm	Air Force*		Martire Family Arena • Fairfield, Connecticut (AHA Quarterfinal Game 1)	FloHockey	Gundarah	W 4–1	1,788	20–10–5
March 8	7:00 pm	Air Force*		Martire Family Arena • Fairfield, Connecticut (AHA Quarterfinal Game 2)	FloHockey	Gundarah	L 2–3 ^{2OT}	2,215	20–11–5
March 9	5:00 pm	Air Force*		Martire Family Arena • Fairfield, Connecticut (AHA Quarterfinal Game 3)	FloHockey	Gundarah	W 4–1	1,709	21–11–5
March 14	7:00 pm	Bentley*		Martire Family Arena • Fairfield, Connecticut (AHA Semifinal Game 1)	FloHockey	Gundarah	L 2–5	2,301	21–12–5
March 15	5:00 pm	Bentley*		Martire Family Arena • Fairfield, Connecticut (AHA Semifinal Game 2)	FloHockey	Gundarah	L 0–3	2,700	21–13–5
*Non-conference game. ^{#}Rankings from USCHO.com Poll. All times are in Eastern Time. Source:

== Scoring statistics ==
Name	Position	Games	Goals	Assists	Points	PIM
Félix Trudeau	LW	39	15	23	38	64
John Jaworski	F	39	13	18	31	12
Reid Pabich	C	39	13	15	28	18
Mikey Adamson	D	37	12	15	27	14
Max Dorrington	F	38	12	10	22	47
Hunter Sansbury	D	39	6	15	21	30
Marcus Joughin	F	39	3	18	21	14
Tyler Ghirardosi	F	32	8	11	19	12
Matthew Guerra	F	39	7	12	19	37
Cole Galata	F	38	6	7	13	11
Jacob Hewitt	F	33	5	8	13	14
Charles-Edward Tardif	C	35	2	9	11	14
John Driscoll	D	39	2	8	10	14
Jake Bongo	F	22	3	4	7	0
Michael Rubin	D	31	1	6	7	10
Aiden VanRooyan	D	32	1	6	7	10
Jérémi Tremblay	F	24	2	4	6	21
Gabe Blanchard	D	38	0	6	6	31
Daniel Ebrahim	LW	33	3	2	5	8
Paul Minnehan	F	14	1	3	4	2
Garrett Sundquist	D	20	1	3	4	2
Rylee Hlusiak	RW	14	1	1	2	0
Luke Amell	D/F	7	1	0	1	6
Vitaly Levyy	F	9	0	1	1	2
Willyam Gendron	C	3	0	0	0	2
Brendan Dumas	F	8	0	0	0	8
Cullen DeYoung	G	15	0	0	0	0
Ajeet Gundarah	G	26	0	1	1	0
Jack O'Dea	G	1	0	0	0	0
Total			118	208	326	421

== Goaltending statistics ==
Name	Games	Minutes	Wins	Losses	Ties	Goals against	Saves	Shut-outs	SV %	GAA
Jack O'Dea	1	3:18	0	0	0	0	2	0	1.000	0.00
Ajeet Gundarah	26	1578:12	16	7	3	50	729	3	.936	1.90
Cullen DeYoung	15	820:57	5	6	2	44	338	0	.885	3.22
Empty Net	-	12:34	-	-	-	7	-	-	-	-
Total	39	2415:01	21	13	5	101	1129	3	.914	2.51

== Rankings ==
Poll	Week																											
Poll	Pre	1	2	3	4	5	6	7	8	9	10	11	12	13	14	15	16	17	18	19	20	21	22	23	24	25	26	27 (Final)
USCHO.com	NR	NR	NR	NR	NR	NR	NR	NR	NR	NR	NR	NR	–	NR	NR	NR	NR	NR	NR	NR	NR	NR	NR	NR	NR	NR	–	NR
USA Hockey	NR	NR	NR	NR	NR	NR	NR	NR	NR	NR	NR	NR	–	NR	NR	NR	NR	NR	NR	NR	NR	NR	NR	NR	NR	NR	NR	NR

Note: USCHO did not release a poll in week 12 or 26.
Note: USA Hockey did not release a poll in week 12.

== Awards and honors ==
Player	Award	Ref
Mikey Adamson	All-Atlantic Hockey America Second Team	
Félix Trudeau	All-Atlantic Hockey America Second Team	
Ajeet Gundarah	All-Atlantic Hockey America Third Team	
Hunter Sansbury	All-Atlantic Hockey America Third Team	
Ajeet Gundarah	Atlantic Hockey America All-Rookie Team	
