= List of All-Atlantic Hockey America men's teams =

The All-Atlantic Hockey America Teams are composed of players at all positions from teams that are members of the men's division of Atlantic Hockey America, an NCAA Division I hockey-only conference. Each year, at the conclusion of the Atlantic Hockey America regular season, the head coaches of each member team vote for players to be placed on each all-conference team.

The all-conference teams are composed of one goaltender, two defencemen and three forwards. Should a tie occur for the final selection at any position, both players will be included as part of the superior team with no reduction in the number of players appearing on any succeeding teams. Players may only appear once per year on any of the first, second, or third teams but freshman may appear on both the rookie team and one of the other all-conference teams.

Atlantic Hockey America was formed out of the merger between Atlantic Hockey (men's teams) and College Hockey America (women's teams) and is sometimes conflated with its parent conferences.

== All-Conference Teams ==
=== First Team ===
2024–25
Player	Pos	Team
Thomas Gale	G	Holy Cross
Nick Bochen	D	Bentley
Mac Gadowsky	D	Army
Ethan Leyh	F	Bentley
Liam McLinskey	F	Holy Cross
Matthew Wilde	F	RIT

2025–26
Player	Pos	Team
J. J. Cataldo	G	Army
Chris Hedden	D	Air Force
Mikey Adamson	D	Sacred Heart
Félix Trudeau	F	Sacred Heart
Jack Stockfish	F	Holy Cross
Jake Black	F	Bentley

==== First Team All-Stars by school ====
School	Winners
Bentley	3
Holy Cross	3
Army	2
Sacred Heart	2
Air Force	1
RIT	1

=== Second Team ===
2024–25
Player	Pos	Team
Connor Hasley	G	Bentley
Mikey Adamson	D	Sacred Heart
Mack Oliphant	D	Holy Cross
Matteo Giampa	F	Canisius
Trevor Hoskin	F	Niagra
Felix Trudeau	F	Sacred Heart

2025–26
Player	Pos	Team
Jakub Krbecek	G	RIT
Mack Oliphant	D	Holy Cross
Dominic Elliott	D	Robert Morris
Tanner Klimpke	F	Robert Morris
Jack Ivey	F	Army
Stephen Castagna	F	Bentley

==== Second Team All-Stars by school ====
School	Winners
Bentley	2
Holy Cross	2
Robert Morris	2
Sacred Heart	2
Army	1
Canisius	1
Niagara	1
RIT	1

=== Third Team ===
2024–25
Player	Pos	Team
Ajeet Gundarah	G	Sacred Heart
Hunter Sansbury	D	Sacred Heart
Evan Stella	D	American International
Jay Ahearn	F	Niagra
Tyler Fukakusa	F	RIT
Devin Phillips	F	Holy Cross

2025–26
Player	Pos	Team
Dominik Wasik	G	Air Force
Jack Dalton	D	Bentley
Nolan Cunningham	D	Air Force
Grant Porter	F	Canisius
Walter Zacher	F	Canisius
Killian Kiecker-Olson	F	Canisius

==== Third Team All-Stars by school ====
School	Winners
Canisius	3
Air Force	2
Sacred Heart	2
American International	1
Bentley	1
Holy Cross	1
Niagara	1
RIT	1

=== Rookie Team ===
2024–25
Player	Pos	Team
Ajeet Gundarah	G	Sacred Heart
Dominic Elliott	D	Robert Morris
Dominic Payne	D	Canisius
Trevor Hoskin	F	Niagra
Jack Ivey	F	Army
Matt Kursonis	F	Holy Cross

2025–26
Player	Pos	Team
Lukas Swedin	G	Bentley
F. J. Buteau	D	Canisius
John Babcock	D	Robert Morris
Zach Wigle	F	RIT
Evan Konyen	F	RIT
Maxim Muranov	F	Niagra

==== Rookie Team All-Stars by school ====
School	Winners
Canisius	2
Niagara	2
RIT	2
Robert Morris	2
Army	1
Bentley	1
Holy Cross	1
Sacred Heart	1

== See also ==
- List of All-Atlantic Hockey Teams
- MAAC Awards
