= 2008 Atlantic Hockey men's ice hockey tournament =

2008 Atlantic Hockey Men's ice hockey tournament
- Dates: March 7–16, 2008
- Teams: 10
- Finals site: Blue Cross Arena; Rochester, New York
- Champions: Air Force (2nd title)
- Winning coach: Frank Serratore (2nd title)
- MVP: Brent Olson (Air Force)
- Atlantic Hockey Men's Ice Hockey Tournaments

The 2008 Atlantic Hockey Men's Ice Hockey Tournament was the 5th conference tournament in league history. It was played between March 7 and March 16, 2008. Quarterfinal games were played at home team campus sites, while all 'Final Five' games were played at the Blue Cross Arena in Rochester, New York. By winning the tournament, Air Force received Atlantic Hockey's automatic bid to the 2008 NCAA Division I Men's Ice Hockey Tournament.

== Format ==
The tournament featured four rounds of play. Teams were seeded No. 1 through No. 10 according to their final conference standing, with a tiebreaker system used to seed teams with an identical number of points accumulated. The top five seeded teams each earned home ice and hosted one of the lower seeded teams. All quarterfinal matchups were best-of-three series with the top three remaining seeds receiving byes into the semifinal round and the lowest two remaining seeds playing in a four-vs-five match. All rounds after the quarterfinals were conducted as single-elimination games. The winner of the four-vs-five game would advance to the semifinals to play the highest remaining seed while the other two remaining seeds faced off in the other semifinal game. The winners of the semifinal games advanced to play each other in a championship game with the tournament champion receiving an automatic bid to the 2008 NCAA Division I Men's Ice Hockey Tournament.

== Conference standings ==
Note: GP = Games played; W = Wins; L = Losses; T = Ties; PTS = Points; GF = Goals For; GA = Goals Against

2007–08 Atlantic Hockey standings
	Conference							Overall					
	GP	W	L	T	PTS	GF	GA	GP	W	L	T	GF	GA
Army†	28	17	8	3	37	84	51	37	19	14	4	101	73
RIT	28	15	8	5	35	87	72	37	19	12	6	116	109
Air Force*	28	14	9	5	33	89	65	39	21	12	6	130	91
Sacred Heart	28	14	11	3	31	91	79	38	16	19	3	111	116
Mercyhurst	28	11	10	7	29	83	89	41	15	19	7	112	133
Canisius	28	10	13	5	25	80	79	37	11	20	6	93	121
Connecticut	28	11	14	3	25	62	84	37	13	21	3	79	126
Bentley	28	9	13	6	24	81	88	36	9	21	6	89	124
Holy Cross	28	9	15	4	22	66	85	36	10	19	7	88	114
American International	28	8	17	3	19	67	98	36	8	23	5	83	135
Championship: Air Force † indicates conference regular season champion * indicates conference tournament champion Final rankings: USA Today/USA Hockey Magazine Top 15 Poll

== Bracket ==
Teams are reseeded after the Quarterfinals

Quarterfinals; March 7–9
1	Army	4	5	—
10	American International	0	2	—
2	RIT	5*	5*	—
9	Holy Cross	4	4	—
3	Air Force	9	3	—
8	Bentley	2	1	—
4	Sacred Heart	6	2	4
7	Connecticut	5	3*	1
5	Mercyhurst	4	2*	—
6	Canisius	1	1	—

Four vs. Five; March 14
4	Sacred Heart	1
5	Mercyhurst	4

Semifinals; March 15
1	Army	2
5	Mercyhurst	4
2	RIT	0
3	Air Force	5

Championship; March 16
3	Air Force	5**
5	Mercyhurst	4

Note: * denotes overtime period(s)

=== Quarterfinals ===
==== (1) Army vs. (10) American International ====
March 7	Army	4 – 0	American International	Tate Rink	Recap
(Flicek, Meyer) Bryce Hollweg - GW - 03:11		First period	No scoring
No scoring		Second period	No scoring
(Pierson, Sefchik) Rob Ross - 08:56 (Anderson) Will Ryan - 12:25 (unassisted) Eric Sefchik - 13:10		Third period	No scoring
( 24 saves / 24 shots ) Josh Kassel		Goalie stats	Dan Ramirez ( 27 saves / 31 shots )

March 8	Army	5 – 2	American International	Tate Rink	Recap
(Ryan, Colvin) Joey Ammon - 13:15		First period	09:12 - PP - Mark Pavli (Bolognino, McMillan); 17:23 - Greg Genovese (Little, Campanale)
(Fearing, Colvin) Ken Rowe - 04:11 (unassisted) Owen Meyer - GW PS - 19:19 (Omilusik) Ken Rowe - 19:39		Second period	No scoring
(Sefchik, Meyer) Bryce Hollweg - 01:59		Third period	No scoring
( 28 saves / 30 shots ) Josh Kassel		Goalie stats	Tom Fenton ( 29 saves / 34 shots )

Army won series 2–0

==== (2) RIT vs. (9) Holy Cross ====
March 7	RIT	5 – 4	OT	Holy Cross	Frank Ritter Memorial Ice Arena	Recap
(Lambert, Ringwald) Matt Smith - PP - 08:25		First period		19:32 - Joe Brock (Dams, Reinhardt)
No scoring		Second period		19:59 - Matt Znutas (unassisted)
(Sarazin, Burns) Stevan Matic - 02:33 (Ringwald, Lambert) Matt Smith - PP - 08:54 (Burns) Matt Smith - 16:01		Third period		06:21 - PP - Matt Burke (Forshner); 09:06 - Brodie Sheahan (Forshner, Gabriel)
(Lambert, Ringwald) Matt Crowell - GW - 15:19		First overtime period		No scoring
( 21 saves / 25 shots ) Louis Menard		Goalie stats		Adam Roy ( 36 saves / 41 shots )

March 8	RIT	5 – 4	OT	Holy Cross	Frank Ritter Memorial Ice Arena	Recap
(Lambert, Murphy) Matt Smith - PP - 03:12 (Favot, Lambert) Matt Crowell - 15:43		First period		08:19 - Dale Reinhardt (Dams)
(Lambert, Murphy) Matt Smith - PP - 01:07		Second period		05:16 - Cal St. Denis (Franklin, Jelinek); 05:54 - Rob Forshner (Sheen, Werry); 12:34 - Rob Forshner (Burke, Brock)
(Draper, Kharin) Jesse Newman - 08:32		Third period		No scoring
(Patry, Walton) Matt Smith - GW - 04:17		First overtime period		No scoring
( 17 saves / 21 shots ) Louis Menard		Goalie stats		Adam Roy ( 33 saves / 38 shots )

RIT won series 2–0

==== (3) Air Force vs. (8) Bentley ====
March 7	Air Force	9 – 2	Bentley	Cadet Ice Arena
(Fairchild, Flynn) Josh Schaffer - 09:01		First period	11:07 - Pat Percella (Preece)
(Nylander, Hajner) Derrick Burnett - PP - 02:50 (Olson, Frider) Scott Kozlak - GW - 04:18 (Nylander, Mayra) Sean Bertsch - 04:54 (Charbonneau, Frider) Mike Phillipich - PP - 07:22 (Hajner, Burnett) Brett Nylander - 09:33 (Kelly, Sellers) Blake Page - 13:05 (Hajner) Greg Flynn - PP - 16:37		Second period	No scoring
(Bertsch, Phillipich) Brad Sellers - 07:26		Third period	12:49 - Jeff Gumaer (Canzoneri, Prewitt)
( 16 saves / 18 shots ) Andrew Volkening		Goalie stats	Joe Calvi ( 13 saves / 17 shots ) / Nick Moise ( 14 saves / 19 shots )

March 8	Air Force	3 – 1	Bentley	Cadet Ice Arena	Recap
(Fairchild, Flynn) Brent Olson - PP - 09:27 (Hajner, Burnett) Greg Flynn - GW PP - 10:03		First period	No scoring
(Burnett, Charbonneau) Jeff Hajner - PP - 03:59		Second period	No scoring
No scoring		Third period	15:12 - Dain Prewitt (Cloutier, Canzoneri)
( 21 saves / 22 shots ) Andrew Volkening		Goalie stats	Joe Calvi ( 43 saves / 46 shots )

Air Force won series 2–0

==== (4) Sacred Heart vs. (7) Connecticut ====
March 7	Sacred Heart	6 – 5	Connecticut	Milford Ice Pavilion
(Tyll, Drew) Alexandre Parent - 17:47		First period	No scoring
(Knowlton, Johnson) Scott Marchesi - PP - 05:06 (Tyll) Alexandre Parent - SH - 10:30		Second period	13:09 - PP - Brendan Olinyk (Ochoa, Hernandez); 17:28 - PP - Matt Pedemonti (Schneider, Behler); 18:12 - Matt Miller (Krispel, Olson)
(Jarman) Erik Boisvert - SH - 06:10 (Parent, Grimson) Bear Trapp - PP - 08:41 (Parent, Boisvert) Dave Jarman - GW - 15:38		Third period	07:04 - Jeff Sapieha (Olinyk, Miller); 19:45 - Matt Pedemonti (Olson, Schneider)
( 30 saves / 35 shots ) Stefan Drew		Goalie stats	Beau Erickson ( 19 saves / 25 shots )

March 8	Sacred Heart	2 – 3	OT	Connecticut	Milford Ice Pavilion
(Trapp, Giosa) Nick Johnson - 07:09		First period		09:46 - Jason Krispel (Olson, Spicer)
No scoring		Second period		No scoring
(Gordon) Evan Mladenoff - 18:02		Third period		06:08 - Andrew Olson (Spicer, Krispel)
No scoring		First overtime period		05:28 - GW - Michael Coppola (Solberg, Bergin)
( 33 saves / 36 shots ) Stefan Drew		Goalie stats		Beau Erickson ( 31 saves / 33 shots )

March 9	Sacred Heart	4 – 1	Connecticut	Milford Ice Pavilion
(Rodriguez, Berube) Adam DeJong - 04:22		First period	No scoring
(Knowlton, Berube) Adam DeJong - GW - 07:12		Second period	No scoring
(Tyll) Evan Mladenoff - 11:45 (Trapp) Alexandre Parent - EN - 18:48		Third period	05:03 - Chris Spicer (Miller)
( 32 saves / 33 shots ) Stefan Drew		Goalie stats	Beau Erickson ( 44 saves / 47 shots )

Sacred Heart won series 2–1

==== (5) Mercyhurst vs. (6) Canisius ====
March 7	Mercyhurst	4 – 1	Canisius	Mercyhurst Ice Center
No Scoring		First period	No scoring
(Pierce, Eddy) Brett Robinson - 04:32 (Echtermach, Eddy) Chris Risi - GW - 10:07 (Robinson, Cottreau) Matt Pierce - PP - 11:41		Second period	No scoring
(Bremner, Graham) Mike Gurtler - 16:15		Third period	06:16 - Jason Weeks (Kasch, Heidinger)
( 41 saves / 42 shots ) Matt Lundin		Goalie stats	Andrew Loewen ( 31 saves / 35 shots )

March 8	Mercyhurst	2 – 1	OT	Canisius	Mercyhurst Ice Center
(Terminesi, Fennell) Matt Pierce - PP - 10:24		First period		No scoring
No scoring		Second period		18:21 - Vincent Scarsella (Jenks)
No scoring		Third period		No scoring
(Vansenbeld, Cottreau) Kerry Bowman - GW - 01:45		First overtime period		No scoring
( 28 saves / 29 shots ) Matt Lundin		Goalie stats		Andrew Loewen ( 32 saves / 34 shots )

Mercyhurst won series 2–0

=== Four vs. Five ===
==== (4) Sacred Heart vs. (5) Mercyhurst ====
March 14	Sacred Heart	1 – 4	Mercyhurst	Blue Cross Arena	Recap
(Grimson, Trapp) Dave Jarman - PP - 09:13		First period	06:16 - PP - Matt Pierce (Terminesi, Robinson)
No scoring		Second period	00:41 - GW - Cullen Eddy (unassisted)
No scoring		Third period	10:14 - Ben Cottreau (Fennell); 17:30 - Chris Risi (Medernach, Lundin)
( 18 saves / 22 shots ) Stefan Drew		Goalie stats	Matt Lundin ( 38 saves / 39 shots )

=== Semifinals ===
==== (1) Army vs. (5) Mercyhurst ====
March 15	Army	2 – 4	Mercyhurst	Blue Cross Arena	Recap
(Ryan, Ammon) Aaron Anderson - 14:23		First period	07:29 - PP - Matt Pierce (Fennell, Robinson); 15:24 - Mike Gurtler (Graham, Phillips)
(Omilusik, Flicek) Bryce Hollweg - PP - 01:39		Second period	No scoring
No scoring		Third period	00:25 - GW SH - Chris Risi (Vandenbeld); 05:41 - EA - Neil Graham (Bremner, Gurtler)
( 23 saves / 27 shots ) Josh Kassel		Goalie stats	Matt Lundin ( 36 saves / 38 shots )

==== (2) RIT vs. (3) Air Force ====
March 15	RIT	0 – 5	Air Force	Blue Cross Arena	Recap
No Scoring		First period	06:32 - GW PP - Brent Olson (Frider, Charbonneau)
No scoring		Second period	05:49 - Mike Phillipich (Charbonneau, Schaffer); 10:04 - SH - Matt Fairchild (Nylander); 17:18 - PP - Brent Olson (Charbonneau, Hajner)
No scoring		Third period	10:34 - Matt Fairchild (Hajner, Mayra)
( 22 saves / 27 shots ) Louis Menard / ( 2 saves / 2 shots ) Jared DeMichiel		Goalie stats	Andrew Volkening ( 24 saves / 24 shots )

=== Championship ===
==== (3) Air Force vs. (5) Mercyhurst ====
March 16	Air Force	5 – 4	2OT	Mercyhurst	Blue Cross Arena	Recap
(Phillipich, Flynn) Brent Olson - PP - 19:58		First period		No scoring
(Kozlak, Frider) Frank Schiavone - 13:23		Second period		17:11 - PP - Matt Pierce (Cottreau, Terminesi); 07:53 - PP - Steve Cameron (Pitt, Coccimiglio)
(Phillipich, Bertsch) Josh Schaffer - 09:50 (Olson, Kozlak) Josh Frider - 11:30		Third period		03:50 - Nick Vandenbeld (Risi); 11:09 - Brett Robinson (Pierce)
(Olson) Josh Frider - 00:56		Second overtime period		No scoring
( 49 saves / 53 shots ) Andrew Volkening		Goalie stats		Matt Lundin ( 42 saves / 47 shots )

== Tournament awards ==
=== All-Tournament Team ===
- G Andrew Volkening (Air Force)
- D Matt Charbonneau (Air Force)
- D Jeff Terminesi (Mercyhurst)
- F Brent Olson* (Air Force)
- F Matt Pierce (Mercyhurst)
- F Chris Risi (Mercyhurst)

* Most Valuable Player(s)
