= Ben Cottreau =

Canadian ice hockey player

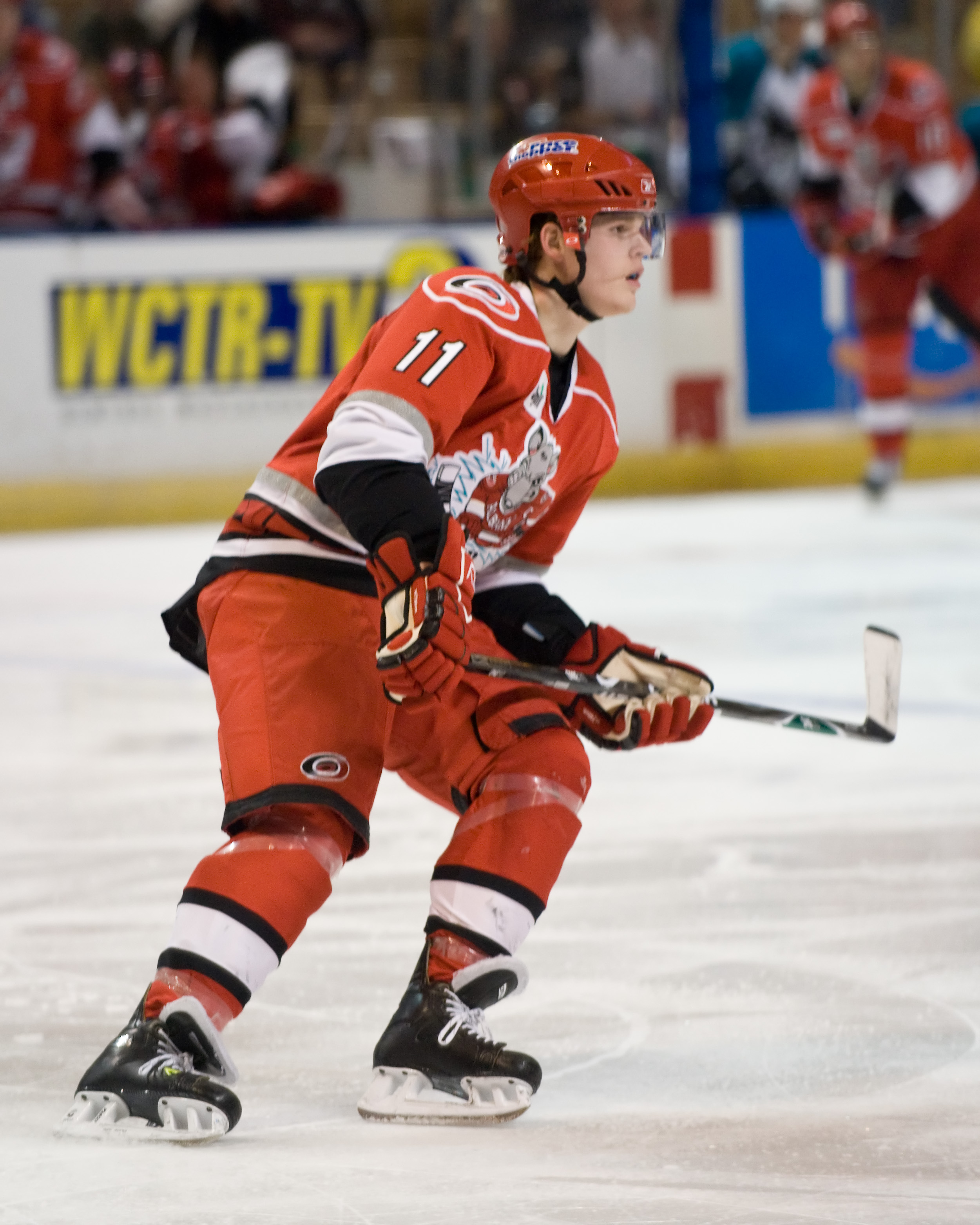
- Born: April 4, 1985 (age 40) Toronto, Ontario, Canada
- Height: 5 ft 11 in (180 cm)
- Weight: 209 lb (95 kg; 14 st 13 lb)
- Position: Forward
- Shot: Left
- Played for: Albany River Rats; Hannover Scorpions
- NHL draft: Undrafted
- Playing career: 2008–2010

Ben Cottreau (born April 4, 1985) is a Canadian former professional ice hockey player. He played college hockey at Mercyhurst University.

After ending his college career, Cottreau leaped to the professional ranks, signing a contract with the Albany River Rats of the American Hockey League on March 20, 2008.

Cottreau spent the 2008-09 season with the Landshut Cannibals of the DEL2. He later signed with the Hannover Scorpions of the Deutsche Eishockey Liga (DEL) on June 8, 2009. On February 16, 2010, Cottreau signed a two-year contract extension with the Scorpions. However, he retired from professional hockey on May 12, 2011 due to various head injuries suffered during his playing career.

== Awards and honours ==
Award	Year
All-Atlantic Hockey Rookie Team	2004–05
All-Atlantic Hockey Second Team	2005–06
All-Atlantic Hockey Second Team	2007–08

Awards and achievements
Preceded by Pierre-Luc O'Brien	Atlantic Hockey Rookie of the Year; 2004–05	Succeeded by Bear Trapp
Preceded by Reid Cashman	Atlantic Hockey Regular Season Scoring Trophy; 2005–06; Shared With; Tyler McGregor	Succeeded by Eric Ehn
