= 2004–05 NCAA Division I men's ice hockey season =

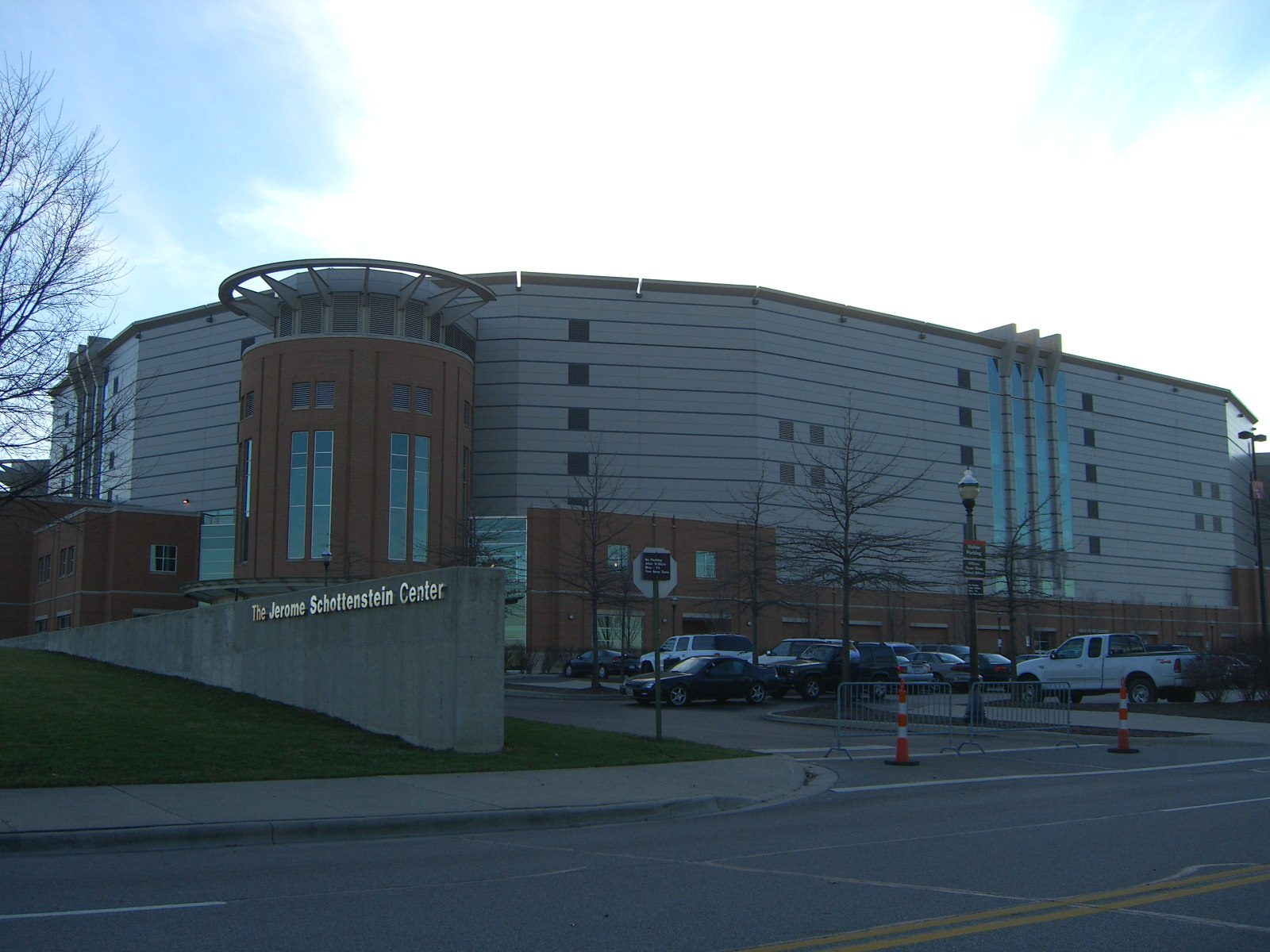
- The Value City Arena in Columbus, Ohio hosted the 2005 Frozen Four
- Duration: October 3, 2004– April 9, 2005
- NCAA tournament: 2005
- National championship: Value City Arena; Columbus, Ohio
- NCAA champion: Denver
- Hobey Baker Award: Marty Sertich (Colorado College)

The 2004–05 NCAA Division I men's ice hockey season began on October 3, 2004 and concluded with the 2005 NCAA Division I Men's Ice Hockey Tournament's championship game on April 9, 2005 at the Value City Arena in Columbus, Ohio. This was the 58th season in which an NCAA ice hockey championship was held and is the 111th year overall where an NCAA school fielded a team.

== Season Outlook ==
=== Pre-season polls ===
The top teams in the nation as ranked before the start of the season.

The U.S. College Hockey Online/College Sports Television poll was voted on by coaches, media, and NHL scouts. The USA Today/USA Hockey Magazine poll was voted on by coaches and media.

USA Hockey changed the name of its magazine from American Hockey Magazine to USA Hockey Magazine in August 2004.

U.S. College Hockey Online partnered with cable sports network College Sports Television to release its weekly poll.

USCHO Poll
Rank	Team
1	Michigan (17)
2	Maine (9)
3	Boston College (2)
4	Minnesota-Duluth (4)
5	North Dakota (2)
6	Minnesota
7	Denver (4)
8	Wisconsin (1)
9	Michigan State
10	New Hampshire (1)
11	Dartmouth
12	Ohio State
13	Cornell
14	Colorado College
15	Miami

USA Today Poll
Rank	Team
1	Boston College (9)
2	Michigan (16)
3	North Dakota (1)
4	Maine
5	Minnesota-Duluth (2)
6	Wisconsin (2)
7	Denver (4)
8	Minnesota
9	Michigan State
10	New Hampshire
11	Dartmouth
12	Colorado College
13	Ohio State
14	Cornell
15	Massachusetts-Lowell

== Regular season ==
=== Season tournaments ===
Tournament	Dates	Teams	Champion
Lefty McFadden Invitational	October 8–9	4	Miami (unofficial)
Ice Breaker Tournament	October 9–10	4	New Hampshire
Maverick Stampede	October 9–10	4	Nebraska–Omaha
Nye Frontier Classic	October 15–16	4	Alaska–Anchorage
College Hockey Showcase	November 26–27	4	
Dunkin' Donuts Coffee Pot	November 27–28	4	Merrimack
Dodge Holiday Classic	December 22–23	4	Minnesota
Rensselaer Holiday Tournament	December 26–27	4	Air Force
Florida College Classic	December 28–29	4	Boston College
Great Lakes Invitational	December 29–30	4	Michigan State
Ledyard Bank Classic	December 29–30	4	Dartmouth
Ohio Hockey Classic	December 29–30	4	Colorado College
UConn Holiday Classic	December 30–31	4	Brown
Badger Showdown	December 31–January 1	4	Ferris State
Denver Cup	January 1–2	4	Denver
Beanpot	February 7, 14	4	Boston University

=== Standings ===
2004–05 Atlantic Hockey standings
	Conference							Overall					
	GP	W	L	T	PTS	GF	GA	GP	W	L	T	GF	GA
Quinnipiac†	24	16	6	2	34	96	64	37	21	13	3	120	102
Canisius	24	14	7	3	31	76	62	35	16	15	4	98	98
Mercyhurst*	24	14	7	3	31	86	64	38	18	16	4	124	116
Holy Cross	24	12	7	5	29	76	60	36	16	14	6	108	102
Sacred Heart	24	13	10	1	27	76	73	35	13	21	1	89	128
Connecticut	24	10	12	2	22	64	71	37	11	23	3	90	128
Bentley	24	6	13	5	17	65	83	34	8	20	6	81	125
Army	24	5	16	3	13	47	71	31	7	21	3	60	97
American International	24	4	16	4	12	50	88	31	4	23	4	63	116
Championship: Mercyhurst † indicates conference regular season champion * indicates conference tournament champion Final rankings: USA Today/USA Hockey Magazine Top 15 Poll

2004–05 Central Collegiate Hockey Association standings
	Conference							Overall					
	GP	W	L	T	PTS	GF	GA	GP	W	L	T	GF	GA
#6 Michigan†*	28	23	3	2	48	128	70	42	31	8	3	178	103
#9 Ohio State	28	21	5	2	44	100	62	42	27	11	4	142	96
Northern Michigan	28	17	7	4	38	82	57	40	22	11	7	120	91
Nebraska-Omaha	28	13	11	4	30	101	84	39	19	16	4	133	124
Bowling Green	28	13	12	3	29	92	87	36	16	16	4	117	116
Michigan State	28	12	13	3	27	87	74	41	20	17	4	121	100
Miami	28	11	13	4	26	80	76	38	15	18	5	120	104
Alaska-Fairbanks	28	11	14	3	25	74	99	37	17	16	4	110	122
Lake Superior State	28	8	14	6	22	64	84	38	9	22	7	84	118
Western Michigan	28	8	18	2	18	78	112	37	14	21	2	105	134
Ferris State	28	7	17	4	18	73	97	39	13	22	4	114	131
Notre Dame	28	3	20	5	11	48	105	38	5	27	6	60	138
Championship: Michigan † indicates conference regular season champion * indicates conference tournament champion Final rankings: USA Today/USA Hockey Magazine Top 15 Poll

2004–05 College Hockey America standings
	Conference							Overall					
	GP	W	L	T	PTS	GF	GA	GP	W	L	T	GF	GA
#15 Bemidji State†*	20	16	4	0	32	69	45	37	23	13	1	123	95
Alabama–Huntsville	20	14	5	1	29	71	43	32	18	10	4	106	79
Niagara	20	9	9	2	20	61	62	36	15	19	2	110	114
Wayne State	20	7	9	4	18	55	54	35	14	17	4	107	107
Air Force	20	5	14	1	11	41	64	36	14	19	3	82	107
Robert Morris	20	4	14	2	10	35	64	33	8	21	4	62	107
Championship: Bemidji State † indicates conference regular season champion * indicates conference tournament champion Final rankings: USA Today/USA Hockey Magazine Top 15 Poll

2004–05 ECAC Hockey standings
	Conference							Overall					
	GP	W	L	T	PTS	GF	GA	GP	W	L	T	GF	GA
#5 Cornell†*	22	18	2	2	38	70	26	35	27	5	3	112	45
#10 Harvard	22	15	5	2	32	71	38	34	21	10	3	98	64
#14 Colgate	22	14	5	3	31	55	38	39	25	11	3	108	78
Vermont	22	13	6	3	29	66	37	39	21	14	4	108	85
Dartmouth	22	14	8	0	28	74	49	35	20	13	2	120	83
Brown	22	9	11	2	20	54	60	33	16	14	3	89	87
St. Lawrence	22	9	12	1	19	70	73	38	17	19	2	116	117
Union	22	8	13	1	17	43	72	37	13	22	2	79	111
Clarkson	22	7	13	2	16	44	66	39	13	23	3	92	120
Princeton	22	6	14	2	14	59	81	31	8	20	3	81	120
Rensselaer	22	6	15	1	13	46	73	38	14	22	2	102	118
Yale	22	3	18	1	7	50	89	32	5	25	2	70	140
Championship: Cornell † indicates conference regular season champion (Cleary Cup) * indicates conference tournament champion (Whitelaw Cup); Final rankings: USA Today/USA Hockey Magazine Top 15 Poll

2004–05 Hockey East standings
	Conference							Overall					
	GP	W	L	T	PTS	GF	GA	GP	W	L	T	GF	GA
#7 Boston College†*	24	14	3	7	35	78	47	40	26	7	7	130	79
#12 Boston University	24	15	5	4	34	76	54	41	23	14	4	111	101
#8 New Hampshire	24	15	5	4	34	90	59	42	26	11	5	166	114
#11 Maine	24	13	6	5	31	75	47	40	20	13	7	124	79
Massachusetts–Lowell	24	11	10	3	25	76	66	36	20	12	4	120	96
Northeastern	24	10	10	4	24	66	58	38	15	18	5	100	106
Providence	24	6	14	4	16	54	73	37	12	21	4	85	108
Massachusetts	24	6	16	2	14	48	96	38	13	23	2	86	134
Merrimack	24	1	22	1	3	41	104	36	8	26	2	85	146
Championship: Boston College † indicates conference regular season champion * indicates conference tournament champion Final rankings: USA Today/USA Hockey Magazine Top 15 Poll

2004–05 Western Collegiate Hockey Association standings
	Conference							Overall					
	GP	W	L	T	PTS	GF	GA	GP	W	L	T	GF	GA
#1 Denver†*	28	19	7	2	40	114	81	43	32	9	2	174	110
#2 Colorado College†	28	19	7	2	40	98	66	43	31	9	3	160	101
#4 Minnesota	28	17	10	1	35	105	80	44	28	15	1	155	109
#13 Wisconsin	28	16	9	3	35	94	64	41	23	14	4	127	91
#3 North Dakota	28	13	12	3	29	71	67	45	25	15	5	136	103
Minnesota–Duluth	28	11	13	4	26	90	89	38	15	17	6	119	118
Alaska–Anchorage	28	9	15	4	22	72	102	37	12	19	6	94	129
Minnesota State–Mankato	28	8	16	4	20	82	109	38	13	19	6	118	140
St. Cloud State	28	8	19	1	17	66	100	40	14	23	3	109	126
Michigan Tech	28	7	19	2	16	64	98	37	8	25	4	91	136
Championship: Denver † indicates conference regular season champion * indicates conference tournament champion Final rankings: USA Today/USA Hockey Magazine Top 15 Poll

=== Final regular season polls ===
The top 15 teams ranked before the NCAA tournament.

USA Today Poll
Ranking	Team
1	Denver
2	Boston College
3	Cornell
4	Colorado College
5	Michigan
6	New Hampshire
7	Minnesota
8	Ohio State
9	Harvard
10	Boston University
11	North Dakota
12	Maine
13	Wisconsin
14	Colgate
15	Northern Michigan

USCHO / CSTV Poll
Ranking	Team
1	Denver
2	Boston College
3	Colorado College
4	Cornell
5	Michigan
6	New Hampshire
7	Minnesota
8	Harvard
9	Ohio State
10	North Dakota
11	Boston University
12	Maine
13	Wisconsin
14	Colgate
15	Dartmouth

== 2005 NCAA Tournament ==
First Round
1	Boston College	5
4	Mercyhurst	4
East Regional
2	North Dakota	4
3	Boston University	0
1	Minnesota	1*
4	Maine	0
West Regional
2	Cornell	3
3	Ohio State	2
1	Denver	4*
4	Bemidji State	3
Northeast Regional
2	New Hampshire	3*
3	Harvard	2
1	Colorado College	6
4	Colgate	5
Midwest Regional
2	Michigan	4
3	Wisconsin	1

Regional Finals
1	Boston College	3
2	North Dakota	6
1	Minnesota	2*
2	Cornell	1
1	Denver	4
2	New Hampshire	2
1	Colorado College	4
2	Michigan	3

Frozen Four
E2	North Dakota	4
W1	Minnesota	2
NE1	Denver	6
MW1	Colorado College	2

National Championship
E2	North Dakota	1
NE1	Denver	4

Note: * denotes overtime period(s)

== Player stats ==
=== Scoring leaders ===
The following players led the league in points at the conclusion of the season.

GP = Games played; G = Goals; A = Assists; Pts = Points; PIM = Penalty minutes

Player	Class	Team	GP	G	A	Pts	PIM
Marty Sertich	Junior	Colorado College	43	27	37	64	28
Brett Sterling	Junior	Colorado College	43	34	29	63	74
Jeff Tambellini	Junior	Michigan	42	24	33	57	32
Gabe Gauthier	Junior	Denver	43	26	31	57	46
Sean Collins	Senior	New Hampshire	42	19	37	56	26
T.J. Hensick	Sophomore	Michigan	39	23	32	55	24
Preston Callander	Senior	New Hampshire	42	25	29	54	38
Colin Murphy	Senior	Michigan Tech	37	11	42	53	40
Brent Walton	Junior	Western Michigan	37	21	29	50	28
Scott Parse	Sophomore	Nebraska-Omaha	39	19	30	49	32

=== Leading goaltenders ===
The following goaltenders led the league in goals against average at the end of the regular season while playing at least 33% of their team's total minutes.

GP = Games played; Min = Minutes played; W = Wins; L = Losses; OT = Overtime/shootout losses; GA = Goals against; SO = Shutouts; SV% = Save percentage; GAA = Goals against average

Player	Class	Team	GP	Min	W	L	OT	GA	SO	SV%	GAA
David McKee	Sophomore	Cornell	35	2125	27	5	3	44	10	.947	1.24
Dov Grumet-Morris	Senior	Harvard	31	1910	19	9	3	52	6	.923	1.63
Matti Kaltiainen	Senior	Boston College	24	1369	13	6	3	41	2	.921	1.79
Matt Climie	Freshman	Bemidji State	21	1167	12	5	1	35	4	.916	1.80
Steve Silverhorn	Senior	Colgate	37	2229	24	10	3	70	5	.921	1.88
Cory Schneider	Freshman	Boston College	18	1102	13	1	4	35	1	.916	1.91
Jimmy Howard	Junior	Maine	39	2309	19	13	7	74	6	.924	1.92
Joe Fallon	Freshman	Vermont	32	1932	17	10	4	63	5	.921	1.96
John Curry	Sophomore	Boston University	33	1949	18	11	3	65	3	.922	2.00
Tuomas Tarkki	Senior	Northern Michigan	34	1974	20	8	5	68	3	.930	2.07

== Awards ==
=== NCAA ===
Award		Recipient
Hobey Baker Memorial Award		Marty Sertich, Colorado College
Spencer T. Penrose Award (Coach of the Year)		George Gwozdecky, Denver
Most Outstanding Player in NCAA Tournament		Peter Mannino, Denver
AHCA All-American Teams
East First Team	Position	West First Team
David McKee, Cornell	G	Curtis McElhinney, Colorado College
Andrew Alberts, Boston College	D	Matt Carle, Denver
Noah Welch, Harvard	D	Mark Stuart, Colorado College
Sean Collins, New Hampshire	F	T. J. Hensick, Michigan
Patrick Eaves, Boston College	F	Marty Sertich, Colorado College
Jason Guerriero, Northeastern	F	Brett Sterling, Colorado College
East Second Team	Position	West Second Team
Dov Grumet-Morris, Harvard	G	Tuomas Tarkki, Northern Michigan
Charlie Cook, Cornell	D	Andy Greene, Miami
Brian Yandle, New Hampshire	D	Brett Skinner, Denver
Matt Moulson, Cornell	F	Gabe Gauthier, Denver
Ryan Shannon, Boston College	F	Colin Murphy, Michigan Tech
Lee Stempniak, Dartmouth	F	Jeff Tambellini, Michigan

=== Atlantic Hockey ===
Award		Recipient
Player of the Year		Reid Cashman, Quinnipiac
Best Defensive Forward		Scott Reynolds, Mercyhurst
Best Defenseman		Conrad Martin, Mercyhurst
Rookie of the Year		Ben Cottreau, Mercyhurst
Regular Season Goaltending Award		Ben Conway, Holy Cross
Coach of the Year		Rand Pecknold, Quinnipiac
Most Valuable Player in Tournament		Scott Champagne, Mercyhurst
Individual Sportsmanship		Chris Garceau, Army
Regular Season Scoring Trophy		Reid Cashman, Quinnipiac
All-Atlantic Hockey Teams
First Team	Position	Second Team
Frank Novello, American International	G	Jamie Holden, Quinnipiac
Bryan Woroz, Canisius	G	
Reid Cashman, Quinnipiac	D	Conrad Martin, Mercyhurst
T. J. Kemp, Mercyhurst	D	Kalen Wright, Sacred Heart
Tyler McGregor, Holy Cross	F	Matt Craig, Quinnipiac
Pierre-Luc O'Brien, Sacred Heart	F	Pierre Napert-Frenette, Holy Cross
Tim Olsen, Connecticut	F	David Wrigley, Mercyhurst
Rookie Team	Position	
Brad Smith, Connecticut	G	
Matt Sorteberg, Quinnipiac	D	
Scott Marchesi, Sacred Heart	D	
Ben Cottreau, Mercyhurst	F	
Ben Nelson, Quinnipiac	F	
Alexandre Parent, Sacred Heart	F	

=== CCHA ===
Awards		Recipient
Player of the Year		Tuomas Tarkki, Northern Michigan
Best Defensive Forward		Eric Nystrom, Michigan
Best Defensive Defenseman		Nathan Oystrick, Northern Michigan
Best Offensive Defenseman		Andy Greene, Miami
Rookie of the Year		Bill Thomas, Nebraska-Omaha
Best Goaltender		Tuomas Tarkki, Northern Michigan
Coach of the Year		Mike Kemp, Nebraska-Omaha
Terry Flanagan Memorial Award		Jordan Sigalet, Bowling Green
Ilitch Humanitarian Award		Bo Cheesman, Lake Superior State
Perani Cup Champion		Jordan Sigalet, Bowling Green
Scholar-Athlete of the Year		Michael Eickman, Nebraska-Omaha
Most Valuable Player in Tournament		Jeff Tambellini, Michigan
All-CCHA Teams
First Team	Position	Second Team
Tuomas Tarkki, Northern Michigan	G	Jordan Sigalet, Bowling Green
Andy Greene, Miami	D	Nate Guenin, Ohio State
Nathan Oystrick, Northern Michigan	D	Matt Hunwick, Michigan
T.J. Hensick, Michigan	F	Rod Pelley, Michigan
Scott Parse, Nebraska-Omaha	F	Bill Thomas, Nebraska-Omaha
Jeff Tambellini, Michigan	F	Brent Walton, Western Michigan
Rookie Team	Position	
Wylie Rogers, Alaska-Fairbanks	G	
Joe Grimaldi, Nebraska-Omaha	D	
Mike Hodgson, Bowling Green	D	
Tom Fritsche, Ohio State	F	
Mike Santorelli, Northern Michigan	F	
Bill Thomas, Nebraska-Omaha	F	

=== CHA ===
Award		Recipient
Player of the Year		Andrew Murray, Bemidji State
Rookie of the Year		Stavros Paskaris, Wayne State
Coach of the Year		Tom Serratore, Bemidji State
Student-Athlete of the Year		Andrew Murray, Bemidji State
Easton Three-Star Player of the Year		Bruce Mulherin, Alabama-Huntsville
Most Valuable Player in Tournament		Matt Climie, Bemidji State
All-CHA Teams
First Team	Position	Second Team
Scott Munroe, Alabama-Huntsville	G	Matt Kelly, Wayne State
Peter Jonsson, Bemidji State	D	Brian Gineo, Air Force
Jeremy Schreiber, Alabama-Huntsville	D	Jeff Winchester, Alabama-Huntsville
Andrew Murray, Bemidji State	F	Bruce Mulherin, Alabama-Huntsville
Jared Ross, Alabama-Huntsville	F	Brenden Cook, Bemidji State
Barret Ehgoetz, Niagara	F	Ryan Gale, Niagara
Rookie Team	Position	
Matt Climie, Bemidji State	G	
Chris Kaufman, Robert Morris	D	
Matt Charbonneau, Air Force	D	
Eric Ehn, Air Force	F	
Stavros Paskaris, Wayne State	F	
Jace Buzek, Robert Morris	F	

=== ECAC ===
Award		Recipient
Player of the Year		David McKee, Cornell
Rookie of the Year		Joe Fallon, Vermont
Coach of the Year		Mike Schafer, Cornell
Best Defensive Forward		Tom Cavanagh, Harvard
Best Defensive Defenseman		Jamie Sifers, Vermont
Ken Dryden Award		David McKee, Cornell
Most Outstanding Player in Tournament		Charlie Cook, Cornell
All-ECAC Hockey Teams
First Team	Position	Second Team
David McKee, Cornell	G	Dov Grumet-Morris, Harvard
Luc Paquin, Princeton	D	Charlie Cook, Cornell
Noah Welch, Harvard	D	Jamie Sifers, Vermont
Matt Moulson, Cornell	F	Dustin Sproat, Princeton
Lee Stempniak, Dartmouth	F	Tom Cavanagh, Harvard
T.J. Trevelyan, St. Lawrence	F	Scott Mifsud, Vermont
Rookie Team	Position	
Joe Fallon, Vermont	G	
Sean Hurley, Brown	D	
Sasha Pokulok, Cornell	D	
Tyler Burton, Clarkson	F	
Nick Johnson, Dartmouth	F	
Torrey Mitchell, Vermont	F	

=== Hockey East ===
Award		Recipient
Player of the Year		Patrick Eaves, Boston College
Rookie of the Year		Peter Vetri, Massachusetts-Lowell
Bob Kullen Coach of the Year Award		Jack Parker, Boston University
Len Ceglarski Sportsmanship Award		Jason Guerriero, Northeastern
Best Defensive Forward		Preston Callander, New Hampshire
Best Defensive Defenseman		Tim Judy, Northeastern
Three-Stars Award		Patrick Eaves, Boston College
		Ryan Shannon, Boston College
William Flynn Tournament Most Valuable Player		Brian Boyle, Boston College
All-Hockey East Teams
First Team	Position	Second Team
Keni Gibson, Northeastern	G	John Curry, Boston University
Andrew Alberts, Boston College	D	Bryan Schmidt, Merrimack
Bryan Miller, Boston University	D	Brian Yandle, New Hampshire
Patrick Eaves, Boston College	F	Sean Collins, New Hampshire
Jason Guerriero, Northeastern	F	Mike Morris, Northeastern
Ryan Shannon, Boston College	F	Ben Walter, Massachusetts-Lowell
Rookie Team	Position	
Kevin Regan, New Hampshire	G	
Cory Schneider, Boston College	G	
Peter Vetri, Massachusetts-Lowell	G	
David Leaderer, Massachusetts	D	
Bret Tyler, Maine	D	
Chris Bourque, Boston University	F	
P.J. Fenton, Massachusetts	F	
Peter MacArthur, Boston University	F	

=== WCHA ===
Award		Recipient
Player of the Year		Marty Sertich, Colorado College
Defensive Player of the Year		Mark Stuart, Colorado College
Rookie of the Year		Paul Stastny, Denver
Student-Athlete of the Year		Steven Johns, Minnesota State
Coach of the Year		George Gwozdecky, Denver
Most Valuable Player in Tournament		Brett Sterling, Colorado College
All-WCHA Teams
First Team	Position	Second Team
Curtis McElhinney, Colorado College	G	Bernd Bruckler, Wisconsin
Matt Carle, Denver	D	Lars Helminen, Michigan Tech
Brett Skinner, Denver	D	Mark Stuart, Colorado College
Marty Sertich, Colorado College	F	Gabe Gauthier, Denver
Brett Sterling, Colorado College	F	Evan Schwabe, Minnesota-Duluth
Colin Murphy, Michigan Tech	F	Robbie Earl, Wisconsin
Third Team	Position	Rookie Team
Cam Ellsworth, Michigan Tech	G	Nathan Lawson, Alaska-Anchorage
Tom Gilbert, Wisconsin	D	Alex Goligoski, Minnesota
Matt Jones, North Dakota	D	Kyle Klubertanz, Wisconsin
David Backes, Minnesota State	F	Joe Pavelski, Wisconsin
Ryan Potulny, Minnesota	F	Paul Stastny, Denver
Danny Irmen, Minnesota	F	Travis Zajac, North Dakota

== 2005 NHL entry draft ==
Round	Pick	Player	College	Conference	NHL team
1	3	Jack Johnson ^{†}	Michigan	CCHA	Carolina Hurricanes
1	7	Jack Skille ^{†}	Wisconsin	WCHA	Chicago Blackhawks
1	9	Brian Lee ^{†}	North Dakota	WCHA	Ottawa Senators
1	14	Sasha Pokulok	Cornell	ECAC Hockey	Washington Capitals
1	24	T. J. Oshie ^{†}	North Dakota	WCHA	St. Louis Blues
1	25	Andrew Cogliano ^{†}	Michigan	CCHA	Edmonton Oilers
1	27	Joe Finley ^{†}	North Dakota	WCHA	Washington Capitals
1	28	Matt Niskanen ^{†}	Minnesota–Duluth	WCHA	Dallas Stars
2	34	Ryan Stoa ^{†}	Minnesota	WCHA	Colorado Avalanche
2	36	Taylor Chorney ^{†}	North Dakota	WCHA	Edmonton Oilers
2	38	Jeff Frazee ^{†}	Minnesota	WCHA	New Jersey Devils
2	42	Justin Abdelkader ^{†}	Michigan State	CCHA	Detroit Red Wings
2	44	Paul Stastny	Denver	WCHA	Colorado Avalanche
2	47	Tom Fritsche ^{†}	Ohio State	CCHA	Colorado Avalanche
2	51	Mason Raymond ^{†}	Minnesota–Duluth	WCHA	Vancouver Canucks
2	53	Andrew Kozek ^{†}	North Dakota	WCHA	Atlanta Thrashers
2	54	Dan Bertram	Boston College	Hockey East	Chicago Blackhawks
2	58	Nate Hagemo	Minnesota	WCHA	Carolina Hurricanes
2	60	T. J. Fast ^{†}	Denver	WCHA	Los Angeles Kings
2	61	Michael Gergen ^{†}	Minnesota–Duluth	WCHA	Pittsburgh Penguins
3	63	Jason Bailey ^{†}	Michigan	CCHA	Mighty Ducks of Anaheim
3	72	Jonathan Quick ^{†}	Massachusetts	Hockey East	Los Angeles Kings
3	76	Shea Guthrie ^{†}	Clarkson	ECAC Hockey	New York Islanders
3	85	Ben Bishop ^{†}	Maine	Hockey East	St. Louis Blues
3	86	Robby Dee ^{†}	Maine	Hockey East	Edmonton Oilers
3	88	T. J. Hensick	Michigan	CCHA	Colorado Avalanche
4	96	Chris Butler ^{†}	Denver	WCHA	Buffalo Sabres
4	97	Chris VandeVelde ^{†}	North Dakota	WCHA	Edmonton Oilers
4	100	Jonathan Sigalet	Bowling Green	CCHA	Boston Bruins
4	104	Matt Duffy ^{†}	Maine	Hockey East	Florida Panthers
4	109	Andrew Thomas	Denver	WCHA	Washington Capitals
4	112	Alex Stalock ^{†}	Minnesota–Duluth	WCHA	San Jose Sharks
4	113	Nathan Davis	Miami	CCHA	Chicago Blackhawks
5	126	Tim Crowder ^{†}	Michigan State	CCHA	Pittsburgh Penguins
5	129	Anthony Aiello ^{†}	Boston College	Hockey East	Minnesota Wild
5	134	Brennan Turner ^{†}	Yale	ECAC Hockey	Chicago Blackhawks
5	138	Matt Butcher ^{†}	Northern Michigan	WCHA	Vancouver Canucks
5	141	Brian Salcido	Colorado College	WCHA	Mighty Ducks of Anaheim
5	142	Nathan Gerbe ^{†}	Boston College	Hockey East	Buffalo Sabres
5	145	Tim Kunes ^{†}	Boston College	Hockey East	Carolina Hurricanes
5	153	Alex Berry ^{†}	Massachusetts	Hockey East	Toronto Maple Leafs
5	155	Mark Fayne ^{†}	Providence	Hockey East	New Jersey Devils
5	160	Matt Watkins ^{†}	North Dakota	WCHA	Dallas Stars
5	161	Brian Foster ^{†}	New Hampshire	Hockey East	Florida Panthers
5	162	P. J. Fenton	Massachusetts	Hockey East	San Jose Sharks
6	167	Joe Fallon	Vermont	ECAC Hockey	Chicago Blackhawks
6	168	Justin Mercier ^{†}	Miami	CCHA	Colorado Avalanche
6	176	Ryan Maki	Harvard	ECAC Hockey	Nashville Predators
6	178	Greg Beller ^{†}	Yale	ECAC Hockey	New York Rangers
6	180	Tyrell Mason ^{†}	Clarkson	ECAC Hockey	New York Islanders
6	181	Tim Kennedy ^{†}	Michigan State	CCHA	Washington Capitals
6	185	Kris Fredheim ^{†}	Colorado College	WCHA	Vancouver Canucks
6	188	Joe Charlebois ^{†}	New Hampshire	Hockey East	Chicago Blackhawks
6	193	Tony Lucia ^{†}	Minnesota	WCHA	San Jose Sharks
7	195	Joe Vitale ^{†}	Northeastern	Hockey East	Pittsburgh Penguins
7	198	Kyle Lawson ^{†}	Notre Dame	CCHA	Carolina Hurricanes
7	204	Colin Greening ^{†}	Cornell	ECAC Hockey	Ottawa Senators
7	206	Josh Meyers ^{†}	Minnesota–Duluth	WCHA	Los Angeles Kings
7	208	Matt Generous ^{†}	St. Lawrence	ECAC Hockey	Buffalo Sabres
7	210	Luciano Aquino ^{‡}	Maine	Hockey East	New York Islanders
7	212	Patrick Brosnihan ^{†}	Yale	ECAC Hockey	Phoenix Coyotes
7	215	Matt Clackson ^{†}	Western Michigan	CCHA	Philadelphia Flyers
7	217	Brock Bradford ^{†}	Boston College	Hockey East	Boston Bruins
7	220	Matt Glasser ^{†}	Denver	WCHA	Edmonton Oilers
7	223	Pat McGann ^{†}	Quinnipiac	Atlantic Hockey	Dallas Stars
7	224	Zach Bearson ^{†}	Wisconsin	WCHA	Florida Panthers
7	227	Andrew Orpik ^{†}	Boston College	Hockey East	Buffalo Sabres
7	228	Chad Rau ^{†}	Colorado College	WCHA	Toronto Maple Leafs
7	229	Philippe Paquet ^{†}	Clarkson	ECAC Hockey	Montreal Canadiens

† incoming freshman
‡ Aquino had left school the year before

== See also ==
- 2004–05 NCAA Division III men's ice hockey season
