= Atlantic Hockey Regular Season Scoring Trophy =

- Sport: Ice hockey
- Awarded for: The player(s) with the highest point total at the conclusion of the regular season.

History
- First award: 2004
- Final award: 2024
- Most recent: Liam McLinskey

The Atlantic Hockey Regular Season Scoring Trophy was an annual award given out at the conclusion of the Atlantic Hockey regular season to the player(s) that finishes with the highest point total (combined goals and assists). Atlantic Hockey is the only Division I conference that formally recognizes its scoring champion.

== Award winners ==
Year	Winner	Position	School
2003-04	Tim Olsen	Forward	Connecticut
2004-05	Reid Cashman	Defenceman	Quinnipiac
2005-06	Tyler McGregor	Right wing	Holy Cross
2005-06	Ben Cottreau	Left wing	Mercyhurst
2006-07	Eric Ehn	Forward	Air Force
2007-08	Simon Lambert	Center	RIT
2008-09	Jacques Lamoureux	Center	Air Force
2009-10	Cory Conacher	Left wing	Canisius
2010-11	Paul Zanette	Left wing	Niagara
2011-12	Brett Gensler	Forward	Bentley
2012-13	Matthew Zay	Forward	Mercyhurst
2013-14	Brett Gensler	Forward	Bentley

Year	Winner	Position	School
2014–15	Matt Garbowsky	Center	RIT
2015–16	Zac Lynch	Forward	Robert Morris
2016–17	Brady Ferguson	Left wing	Robert Morris
2017–18	Dylan McLaughlin	Center	Cansius
2018–19	Blake Christensen	Forward	American International
2019–20	Austin McIlmurray	Forward	Sacred Heart
2020–21	Jakov Novak	Forward	Bentley
2020–21	Will Calverley	Right wing	RIT
2021–22	Colin Bilek	Forward	Army
2021–22	Neil Shea	Left wing	Sacred Heart
2022–23	Eric Esposito	Left wing	Mercyhurst
2023–24	Liam McLinskey	Forward	Holy Cross

=== Winners by school ===
School	Winners
Bentley	3
Mercyhurst	3
RIT	3
Air Force	2
Canisius	2
Holy Cross	2
Robert Morris	2
Sacred Heart	2
American International	1
Army	1
Connecticut	1
Niagara	1
Quinnipiac	1

=== Winners by position ===
Position	Winners
Center	4
Right wing	3
Left wing	4
Forward	12
Defenceman	0
Goaltender	0

== See also ==
- Atlantic Hockey Awards
