= Matt Sorteberg =

American ice hockey player (born 1986)

- Born: March 2, 1986 (age 39); Anoka, Minnesota, US
- Height: 6 ft 1 in (185 cm)
- Weight: 174 lb (79 kg; 12 st 6 lb)
- Position: Defense
- Shoots: Right
- ECHL team Former teams: Utah Grizzlies; ECHL; Idaho Steelheads
- NHL draft: Undrafted
- Playing career: 2009–present

Matt Sorteberg (born March 2, 1986) is an American professional ice hockey defenseman who is currently playing for the Utah Grizzlies in the ECHL.

Sorteberg attended Quinnipiac University, where he played college hockey with the Quinnipiac Bobcats men's ice hockey team before turning professional with the Idaho Steelheads at the end of the 2008–09 ECHL season.

== Awards and honors ==
| Award | Year |
|---|---|
| All-Atlantic Hockey Rookie Team | 2004–05 |
