= Jacques Lamoureux =

American ice hockey player

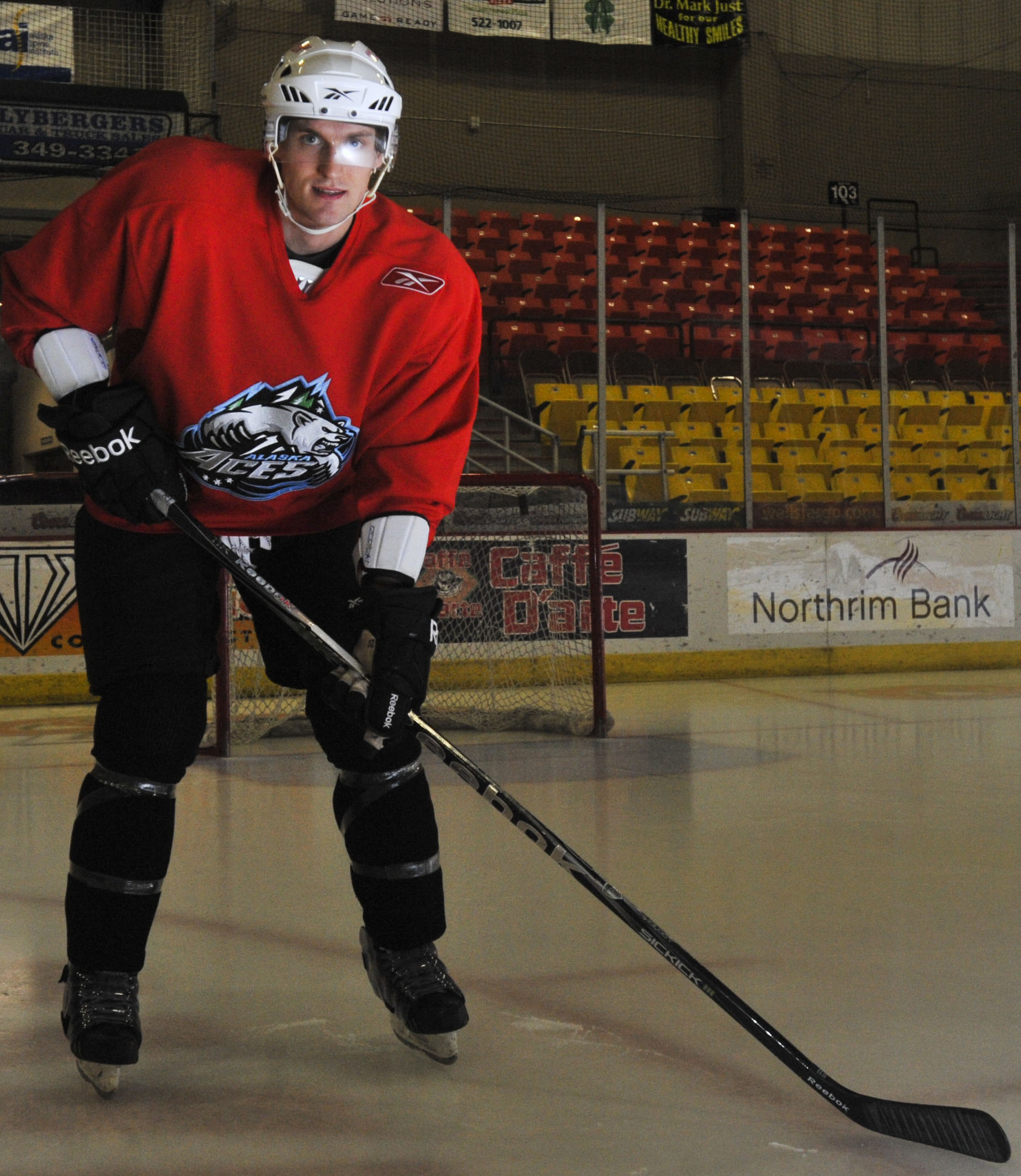
- Lamoureux with the Alaska Aces in 2011
- Born: June 14, 1986 (age 40) Grand Forks, North Dakota, U.S.
- Height: 6 ft 1 in (185 cm)
- Weight: 183 lb (83 kg; 13 st 1 lb)
- Position: Center
- Shoots: Left
- ECHL team: Alaska Aces
- NHL draft: Undrafted
- Playing career: 2011–present

Jacques Lamoureux (born June 14, 1986) is an American ice hockey player who formerly played for the Alaska Aces of the ECHL. A graduate of the United States Air Force Academy, he also serves as a contracting officer in the United States Air Force and was previously stationed with the 673rd Contracting Squadron at Joint Base Elmendorf-Richardson in Alaska. Currently holding the rank of lieutenant colonel, Lamoureux works as an instructor in the Department of Management at USAFA. He is married and has a stepson and a daughter.

Before his professional career, Lamoureux spent four seasons competing in NCAA Division I college hockey, playing for the Air Force Falcons in the Atlantic Hockey conference.

== Family ==
The Lamoureux family is renowned for its remarkable involvement in ice hockey, with all six siblings competing at an elite level of the sport. The eldest sibling, Jean-Philippe, born in 1984, has built a successful career as a professional goaltender and is currently playing in Austria for EC Red Bull Salzburg. Jacques' younger brother, Pierre-Paul, born in 1987, pursued a career as a defenseman, playing three seasons in the highly competitive Western Hockey League (WHL) with the Red Deer Rebels. Another younger brother, Mario, born in 1988, made his mark in collegiate hockey as a forward for the University of North Dakota. Jacques' youngest siblings, twin sisters Jocelyne and Monique, born in 1989, achieved international acclaim representing the United States on the world stage. They helped lead Team USA to silver medals at both the 2010 and the 2014 Winter Olympics, and played pivotal roles in securing a historic gold medal victory at the 2018 Winter Olympics.

== Awards and honors ==
Award	Year
All-Atlantic Hockey First Team	2008–09
AHCA East Second-Team All-American	2008–09
All-Atlantic Hockey First Team	2009–10
All-Atlantic Hockey Second Team	2010–11
Atlantic Hockey All-Tournament Team	2011

Awards and achievements
Preceded by Josh Kassel	Atlantic Hockey Player of the Year; 2008–09	Succeeded by Cory Conacher
Preceded by Simon Lambert	Atlantic Hockey Regular Season Scoring Trophy; 2008–09	Succeeded by Cory Conacher
Preceded by Cameron Burt	Atlantic Hockey Most Valuable Player in Tournament; 2011	Succeeded by Jason Torf
