= Josh Kassel =

American ice hockey player (born 1985)

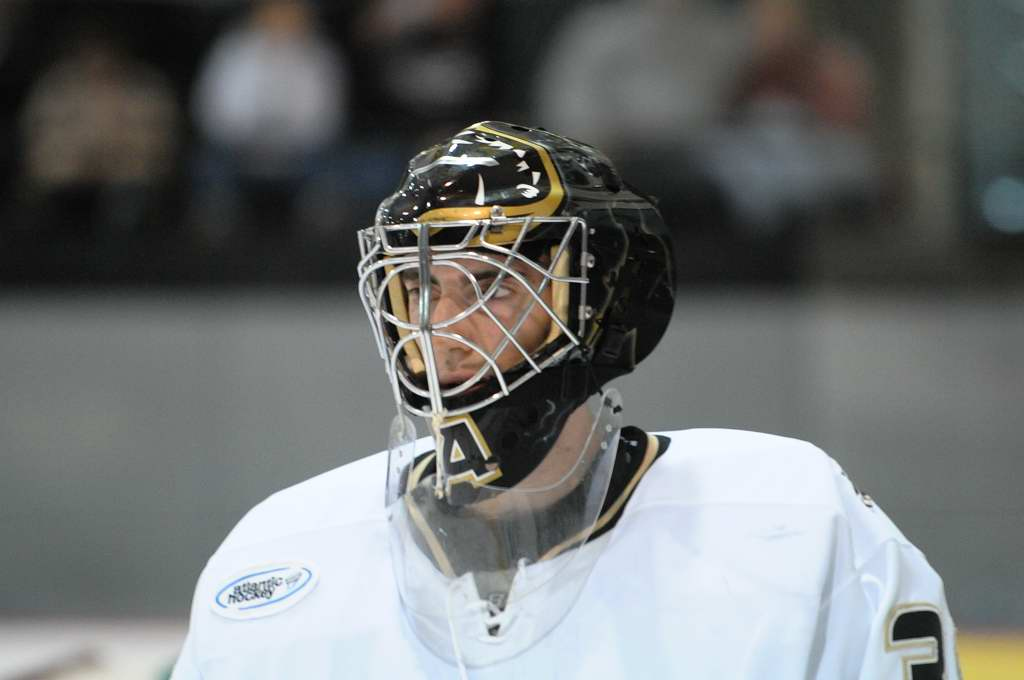
- Josh Kassel
- Born: September 3, 1985 (age 41) Greensburg, Pennsylvania
- Height: 6 ft 0 in (183 cm)
- Weight: 195 lb (88 kg; 13 st 13 lb)
- Position: Goaltender
- AHA team: Army Black Knights
- Playing career: 2005–2009

Josh Kassel (born September 3, 1985) is a former American college ice hockey goaltender for the Army Black Knights of the Atlantic Hockey League. He previously played for the Bozeman Icedogs from 2003 to 2005.

== Biography ==
In 2008, as a junior, Kassel was the Atlantic Hockey All-Conference Player of the Year and was in the top eight nationally for best save percentage and goals against average (GAA).

He was the first goaltender to be awarded the Atlantic Hockey Player of the Year and held the best GAA in Atlantic Hockey league history.

He was selected as Division I Men's Hockey 2008 Second Team All-Americans for the East, becoming the Army's first hockey All-American in nearly 30 years.

Kassel played significantly worse during his senior year and was replaced as the starter by sophomore Jay Clark. He retired from competitive hockey after the 2009 season. He came in as a ringer during the 2025 Fort Bragg Men's League spring season and took the second-to-last place team to the championship, where they won against the last place team.

== Awards and honours ==
Award	Year
All-Atlantic Hockey Second Team	2006-07
All-Atlantic Hockey First Team	2007-08
AHCA East Second-Team All-American	2007-08

Awards and achievements
Preceded by Eric Ehn	Atlantic Hockey Player of the Year; 2007-08	Succeeded by Jacques Lamoureux
Preceded by Louis Menard	Atlantic Hockey Regular Season Goaltending Award; 2007-08	Succeeded by Andrew Volkening
