= List of All-Atlantic Hockey Teams =

The All-Atlantic Hockey Teams were composed of players at all positions from teams that are members of the Atlantic Hockey Association, an NCAA Division I hockey-only conference. Each year, at the conclusion of the Atlantic Hockey regular season, the head coaches of each member team voted for players to be placed on each all-conference team. The First Team, Second Team and Rookie Teams were named from 2003–04 (the inaugural year of Atlantic Hockey) and a Third Team was added starting in 2006–07.

The all-conference teams were composed of one goaltender, two defencemen and three forwards. Should a tie occur for the final selection at any position, both players were included as part of the superior team with no reduction in the number of players appearing on any succeeding teams (as happened in 2004–05 and 2008–09). Players may only appear once per year on any of the first, second, or third teams but freshman may appear on both the rookie team and one of the other all-conference teams.

Due to the conference playing in two separate pods (East and West) for the 2020–21 season, as a result of the COVID-19 pandemic, Atlantic Hockey named two all-conference and an all-Rookie team for each pod. No Third team was named.

After the conference merged with College Hockey America in 2024, Atlantic Hockey America began naming all-conference teams under a new banner.

== All-Conference Teams ==
=== First Team ===
==== 2000s ====
2003–04
Player	Pos	Team
Jamie Holden	G	Quinnipiac
T. J. Kemp	D	Mercyhurst
Eric Nelson	D	Connecticut
Jeff Dams	F	Holy Cross
Tim Olsen	F	Connecticut
Guillaume Caron	F	American International

2004–05
Player	Pos	Team
Frank Novello	G	American International
Bryan Woroz	G	Canisius
Reid Cashman	D	Quinnipiac
T. J. Kemp	D	Mercyhurst
Tyler McGregor	F	Holy Cross
Pierre-Luc O'Brien	F	Sacred Heart
Tim Olsen	F	Connecticut

2005–06
Player	Pos	Team
Jason Smith	G	Sacred Heart
Jamie Hunt	D	Mercyhurst
Jon Landry	D	Holy Cross
Tyler McGregor	F	Holy Cross
Dave Borrelli	F	Mercyhurst
Pierre-Luc O'Brien	F	Sacred Heart

2006–07
Player	Pos	Team
Jason Smith	G	Sacred Heart
Jon Landry	D	Holy Cross
Scott Marchesi	D	Sacred Heart
Eric Ehn	F	Air Force
Pierre-Luc O'Brien	F	Sacred Heart
James Sixsmith	F	Holy Cross

2007–08
Player	Pos	Team
Josh Kassel	G	Army
Zach McKelvie	D	Army
Dan Ringwald	D	RIT
Simon Lambert	F	RIT
Alexandre Parent	F	Sacred Heart
Luke Flicek	F	Army

2008–09
Player	Pos	Team
Andrew Volkening	G	Air Force
Greg Flynn	D	Air Force
Zach McKelvie	D	Army
Dan Ringwald	D	RIT
Jacques Lamoureux	F	Air Force
Owen Meyer	F	Army
Brennan Sarazin	F	RIT

==== 2010s ====
2009–10
Player	Pos	Team
Jared DeMichiel	G	RIT
Tim Kirby	D	Air Force
Dan Ringwald	D	RIT
Cory Conacher	F	Canisius
Nick Johnson	F	Sacred Heart
Jacques Lamoureux	F	Air Force

2010–11
Player	Pos	Team
Shane Madolora	G	RIT
Scott Mathis	D	Air Force
Denny Urban	D	Robert Morris
Bryan Haczyk	F	Niagara
Nathan Longpre	F	Robert Morris
Paul Zanette	F	Niagara

2011–12
Player	Pos	Team
Shane Madolora	G	RIT
Tim Kirby	D	Air Force
Scott Mathis	D	Air Force
Kyle De Laurell	F	Air Force
Brett Gensler	F	Bentley
Cole Schneider	F	Connecticut

2012–13
Player	Pos	Team
Carsen Chubak	G	Niagara
Adam McKenzie	D	Air Force
Nick Jones	D	Mercyhurst
Chris Saracino	D	RIT
Kyle De Laurell	F	Air Force
Giancarlo Iuorio	F	Niagara
Brett Gensler	F	Bentley

2013–14
Player	Pos	Team
Jimmy Sarjeant	G	Mercyhurst
Steven Weinstein	D	Bentley
Nick Jones	D	Mercyhurst
Brett Gensler	F	Bentley
Cody Wydo	F	Robert Morris
Matthew Zay	F	Mercyhurst

2014–15
Player	Pos	Team
Matt Ginn	G	Holy Cross
Chris Rumble	D	Canisius
Steven Weinstein	D	Bentley
Matt Garbowsky	F	RIT
Andrew Gladiuk	F	Bentley
Cody Wydo	F	Robert Morris

2015–16
Player	Pos	Team
Shane Starrett	G	Air Force
Lester Lancaster	D	Mercyhurst
Chase Norrish	D	RIT
Greg Gibson	F	Robert Morris
Zac Lynch	F	Robert Morris
Shane Conacher	F	Canisius
Max French	F	Bentley

2016–17
Player	Pos	Team
Charles Williams	G	Canisius
Phil Boje	D	Air Force
Lester Lancaster	D	Mercyhurst
Brady Ferguson	F	Robert Morris
Max French	F	Bentley
Justin Danforth	F	Sacred Heart

2017–18
Player	Pos	Team
Paul Berrafto	G	Holy Cross
Alexander Wilkinson	D	Army
Cameron Heath	D	Canisius
Dylan McLaughlin	F	Canisius
Brady Ferguson	F	Robert Morris
Erik Brown	F	RIT

2018–19
Player	Pos	Team
Billy Christopoulos	G	Air Force
Joseph Duszak	D	Mercyhurst
Brennan Kapcheck	D	American International
Derek Barach	F	Mercyhurst
Blake Christensen	F	American International
Dylan McLaughlin	F	Cansius

==== 2020s ====
2019–20
Player	Pos	Team
Zackarias Skog	G	American International
Mike Lee	D	Sacred Heart
Brennan Kapcheck	D	American International
Blake Christensen	F	American International
Jason Cotton	F	Sacred Heart
Austin McIlmurray	F	Sacred Heart
Jakov Novak	F	Bentley

2020–21
East
Player	Pos	Team
Trevin Kozlowski	G	Army
Brennan Kapcheck	D	American International
Thomas Farrell	D	Army
Colin Bilek	F	Army
Tobias Fladeby	F	American International
Marc Johnstone	F	Sacred Heart
West
Player	Pos	Team
Jacob Barczewski	G	Cansius
Nick Jenny	D	Robert Morris
Dan Willett	D	RIT
Will Calverley	F	Robert Morris
Nick Prkusic	F	RIT
Keaton Mastrodonato	F	Cansius

2021–22
Player	Pos	Team
Jacob Barczewski	G	Canisius
Zak Galambos	D	American International
Drew Bavaro	D	Bentley
Chris Theodore	F	American International
Colin Bilek	F	Army
Will Calverley	F	RIT

2022–23
Player	Pos	Team
Tommy Scarfone	G	RIT
Gianfranco Cassaro	D	RIT
Aiden Hansen-Bukata	D	RIT
Carter Wilkie	F	RIT
Neil Shea	F	Sacred Heart
Blake Bennett	F	American International

2023–24
Player	Pos	Team
Tommy Scarfone	G	RIT
Gianfranco Cassaro	D	RIT
Brian Kramer	D	American International
Liam McLinskey	F	Holy Cross
Carter Wilkie	F	RIT
Will Gavin	F	Air Force
Cody Laskosky	F	RIT

==== First Team All-Stars by school ====
School	Winners
RIT	23
Air Force	16
Sacred Heart	14
American International	13
Mercyhurst	12
Robert Morris	10
Army	10
Bentley	10
Canisius	10
Holy Cross	9
Connecticut	4
Niagara	4
Quinnipiac	2

==== Multiple Appearances ====
Player	First Team Appearances
Brett Gensler	3
Brennan Kapcheck	3
Pierre-Luc O'Brien	3
Dan Ringwald	3
Many Players Tied	2

=== Second Team ===
==== 2000s ====
2003–04
Player	Pos	Team
Tony Quesada	G	Holy Cross
Reid Cashman	D	Quinnipiac
Konn Hawkes	D	Sacred Heart
Garrett Larson	F	Sacred Heart
Mike Carter	F	Mercyhurst
David Wrigley	F	Mercyhurst

2004–05
Player	Pos	Team
Jamie Holden	G	Quinnipiac
Conrad Martin	D	Mercyhurst
Kalen Wright	D	Sacred Heart
Matt Craig	F	Quinnipiac
Pierre Napert-Frenette	F	Holy Cross
David Wrigley	F	Mercyhurst

2005–06
Player	Pos	Team
Brad Roberts	G	Army
Tony Quesada	G	Holy Cross
Josh Chase	D	Bentley
Tim Manthey	D	Army
Pierre Napert-Frenette	F	Holy Cross
Ben Cottreau	F	Mercyhurst
Alexandre Parent	F	Sacred Heart

2006–07
Player	Pos	Team
Josh Kassel	G	Army
Tim Manthey	D	Army
Brent Patry	D	RIT
Simon Lambert	F	RIT
Andrew Ramsey	F	Air Force
Matt Scherer	F	Connecticut

2007–08
Player	Pos	Team
Beau Erickson	G	Connecticut
Scott Marchesi	D	Sacred Heart
Greg Flynn	D	Air Force
Owen Meyer	F	Army
Ben Cottreau	F	Mercyhurst
Bear Trapp	F	Sacred Heart

2008–09
Player	Pos	Team
Ryan Zapolski	G	Mercyhurst
Bobby Raymond	D	RIT
Sean Erickson	D	Connecticut
Dain Prewitt	F	Bentley
Steve Cameron	F	Mercyhurst
Matt Pierce	F	Mercyhurst

==== 2010s ====
2009–10
Player	Pos	Team
Andrew Volkening	G	Air Force
Marcel Alvarez	D	Army
Carl Hudson	D	Canisius
Brandon Coccimigilo	F	Mercyhurst
Andrew Favot	F	RIT
Cody Omilusik	F	Army

2010–11
Player	Pos	Team
Ryan Zapolski	G	Mercyhurst
Marcel Alvarez	D	Army
Chris Saracino	D	RIT
Tyler Brenner	F	RIT
Cory Conacher	F	Canisius
Jacques Lamoureux	F	Air Force

2011–12
Player	Pos	Team
Chris Noonan	G	Niagara
Alex Gerke	D	Connecticut
Chris Haltigin	D	RIT
Michael Colavecchia	F	RIT
John Kruse	F	Air Force
Adam Schmidt	F	Holy Cross

2012–13
Player	Pos	Team
Ben Meisner	G	American International
Dan Weiss	D	Niagara
Steve Weinstein	D	Bentley
Ryan Misiak	F	Mercyhurst
Adam Pleskach	F	American International
Adam Brace	F	Robert Morris

2013–14
Player	Pos	Team
Branden Komm	G	Bentley
Adam McKenzie	D	Air Force
Matthew Blomquist	D	Bentley
Alex Grieve	F	Bentley
Dan O'Donoghue	F	Mercyhurst
Cole Gunner	F	Air Force

2014–15
Player	Pos	Team
Keegan Asmundson	G	Canisius
Brady Norrish	D	RIT
Josh Mitchell	D	RIT
Ryan Misiak	F	Mercyhurst
Ralph Cuddemi	F	Canisius
Cole Gunner	F	Air Force

2015–16
Player	Pos	Team
Parker Gahagen	G	Army
Johnny Hrabovsky	D	Air Force
Tyson Wilson	D	Robert Morris
Andrew Gladiuk	F	Bentley
Ralph Cuddemi	F	Canisius
Justin Danforth	F	Sacred Heart

2016–17
Player	Pos	Team
Parker Gahagen	G	Army
Brady Norrish	D	RIT
Cameron Heath	D	Canisius
Ryan Schmelzer	F	Canisius
Derek Barach	F	Mercyhurst
Jordan Himley	F	Air Force

2017–18
Player	Pos	Team
Brandon Wildung	G	Mercyhurst
Joseph Duszak	D	Mercyhurst
Lester Lancaster	D	Canisius
Jack Riley	F	Mercyhurst
Derek Barach	F	Mercyhurst
Michael Wilson	F	Army

2018–19
Player	Pos	Team
Aidan Pelino	G	Bentley
Tanner Jago	D	Bentley
Dalton MacAfee	D	Army
Abbott Girduckis	F	RIT
Luke Santerno	F	Bentley
Alex Tonge	F	Robert Morris

==== 2020s ====
2019–20
Player	Pos	Team
Justin Kapelmaster	G	Robert Morris
Adam Brubacher	D	RIT
Patrik Demel	D	American International
Dominic Franco	F	Army
Matt Hoover	F	Cansius
Nick Hutchison	F	Cansius

2020–21
East
Player	Pos	Team
Stefano Durante	G	American International
John Zimmerman	D	Army
Matt Slick	D	Holy Cross
Elijah Barriga	F	American International
Chris Dodero	F	American International
Braeden Tuck	F	Sacred Heart
West
Player	Pos	Team
Noah West	G	Robert Morris
Zach LaRocque	G	Air Force
Joseph Maziarz	D	Mercyhurst
Brendan Michaelian	D	Robert Morris
Randy Hernández	F	Robert Morris
Jon Bendorf	F	Mercyhurst
Carson Brière	F	Mercyhurst

2021–22
Player	Pos	Team
Gavin Abric	G	Army
Anthony Firriolo	D	Army
Logan Britt	D	Sacred Heart
Keaton Mastrodonato	F	Canisius
Neil Shea	F	Sacred Heart
Jake Stella	F	American International

2022–23
Player	Pos	Team
Jarrett Fiske	G	American International
Luke Rowe	D	Air Force
Brian Kramer	D	American International
Jack Ricketts	F	Holy Cross
Eric Esposito	F	Mercyhurst
Joey Baez	F	Army

2023–24
Player	Pos	Team
Jason Grande	G	Holy Cross
Chris Hedden	D	Air Force
Aiden Hansen-Bukata	D	RIT
Matteo Giampa	F	Canisius
Jack Ricketts	F	Holy Cross
Joey Baez	F	Army

==== Second Team All-Stars by school ====
School	Winners
Mercyhurst	23
Army	18
RIT	14
Air Force	13
Canisius	12
Bentley	10
Sacred Heart	10
American International	9
Holy Cross	9
Robert Morris	7
Connecticut	4
Quinnipiac	3
Niagara	2

==== Multiple Appearances ====
Player	Second Team Appearances
Marcel Alvarez	2
Joey Baez	2
Derek Barach	2
Ben Cottreau	2
Ralph Cuddemi	2
Cole Gunner	2
Parker Gahagen	2
Ryan Misiak	2
Pierre Napert-Frenette	2
Brady Norrish	2
Tony Quesada	2
Jack Ricketts	2
David Wrigley	2
Ryan Zapolski	2

=== Third Team ===
==== 2000s ====
2006–07
Player	Pos	Team
Louis Menard	G	RIT
Sean Erickson	D	Connecticut
Al Mazur	D	RIT
Luke Flicek	F	Army
Jeff Gumaer	F	Bentley
Jereme Tendler	F	American International

2007–08
Player	Pos	Team
Joe Calvi	G	Bentley
Bobby Raymond	D	RIT
Matt Burke	D	Holy Cross
Eric Ehn	F	Air Force
Brodie Sheahan	F	Holy Cross
Jereme Tendler	F	American International

2008–09
Player	Pos	Team
Kyle Rank	G	Bentley
Al Mazur	D	RIT
Carl Hudson	D	Canisius
Matt Fairchild	F	Bentley
Jason Weeks	F	Canisius
Scott Pitt	F	Mercyhurst

==== 2010s ====
2009–10
Player	Pos	Team
Ryan Zapolski	G	Mercyhurst
Paul Ferraro	D	Sacred Heart
Christopher Tanev	D	RIT
Cameron Burt	F	RIT
Dave Jarman	F	Sacred Heart
Vincent Scarcella	F	Canisius

2010–11
Player	Pos	Team
Brooks Ostergard	G	Robert Morris
Tim Kirby	D	Air Force
Ryan Annesley	D	Niagara
Jeff Terminesi	D	Mercyhurst
Andrew Favot	F	RIT
Cody Omilusik	F	Army
Scott Pitt	F	Mercyhurst

2011–12
Player	Pos	Team
Branden Komm	G	Bentley
Trent Bonnett	D	Bentley
Nick Jones	D	Mercyhurst
Matt Gingera	F	Sacred Heart
Adam Pleskach	F	American International
Cody Crichton	F	Robert Morris

2012–13
Player	Pos	Team
Matt Grogan	G	Connecticut
Kevin Ryan	D	Niagara
Jeff Ceccacci	D	American International
Matthew Zay	F	Mercyhurst
Kyle Gibbons	F	Canisius
Eric Delong	F	Sacred Heart

2013–14
Player	Pos	Team
Terry Shafer	G	Robert Morris
Ben Danforth	D	Canisius
Kevin Ryan	D	Niagara
John Puskar	F	American International
Andrew Gladiuk	F	Bentley
Brant Harris	F	Connecticut

2014–15
Player	Pos	Team
Dalton Izyk	G	Robert Morris
Jayson Argue	G	Bentley
Chase Golightly	D	Robert Morris
Alexander Kuqali	D	RIT
Zac Lynch	F	Robert Morris
Brad McGowan	F	RIT
Daniel Bahntge	F	Mercyhurst

2015–16
Player	Pos	Team
Terry Shafer	G	Robert Morris
Brady Norrish	D	RIT
Chase Golightly	D	Robert Morris
Josh Mitchell	F	RIT
Derek Barach	F	Mercyhurst
Brandon Denham	F	Robert Morris

2016–17
Player	Pos	Team
Shane Starrett	G	Air Force
Eric Israel	D	Robert Morris
Spencer Trapp	D	Holy Cross
Daniel Leavens	F	Robert Morris
Dylan McLaughlin	F	Canisius
Danny Lopez	F	Holy Cross

2017–18
Player	Pos	Team
Billy Christopoulos	G	Air Force
Chase Norrish	D	RIT
Jānis Jaks	D	American International
Derian Plouffe	F	Niagara
Ryan Schmelzer	F	Canisius
Alex Tonge	F	Robert Morris

2018–19
Player	Pos	Team
Frank Marotte	G	Robert Morris
Adam Brubacher	D	RIT
Noah Delmas	D	Niagara
Erik Brown	F	RIT
Jonathan Desbiens	F	Bentley
Austin Magera	F	Sacred Heart
Ludwig Stenlund	F	Niagara

==== 2020s ====
2019–20
Player	Pos	Team
Josh Benson	G	Sacred Heart
Logan Drackett	G	RIT
Brandon Koch	D	Air Force
Matt Stief	D	Cansius
Jack Billings	F	Niagara
Martin Mellberg	F	American International
Hugo Reinhardt	F	American International

2020–21
Not awarded

2021–22
Player	Pos	Team
Jake Kucharski	G	American International
Brandon Koch	D	Air Force
David Melaragni	D	Canisius
Braeden Tuck	F	Sacred Heart
Carson Brière	F	Mercyhurst
Ryan Leibold	F	Holy Cross

2022–23
Player	Pos	Team
Jacob Barczewski	G	Canisius
Nick Hale	D	Holy Cross
Hunter Sansbury	D	Sacred Heart
Keaton Mastrodonato	F	Canisius
John Keranen	F	Army
Jordan Biro	F	American International

2023–24
Player	Pos	Team
Owen Say	G	Mercyhurst
Luke Rowe	D	Air Force
Nick Bochen	D	Bentley
Ethan Leyh	F	Bentley
John Jaworski	F	Sacred Heart
Elijah Gonsalves	F	RIT

==== Third Team All-Stars by school ====
School	Winners
RIT	16
Robert Morris	13
Bentley	11
Canisius	11
American International	10
Mercyhurst	10
Sacred Heart	9
Air Force	7
Niagara	7
Holy Cross	6
Army	3
Connecticut	3

==== Multiple Appearances ====
Player	First Team Appearances
Jereme Tendler	2
Al Mazur	2
Scott Pitt	2
Chase Golightly	2
Terry Shafer	2
Kevin Ryan	2

=== Rookie Team ===
==== 2000s ====
2003–04
Player	Pos	Team
Scott Tomes	G	Connecticut
Reid Cashman	D	Quinnipiac
Jamie Hunt	D	Mercyhurst
Pierre-Luc O'Brien	F	Sacred Heart
Matt Scherer	F	Connecticut
James Sixsmith	F	Holy Cross

2004–05
Player	Pos	Team
Brad Smith	G	Connecticut
Matt Sorteberg	D	Quinnipiac
Scott Marchesi	D	Sacred Heart
Ben Cottreau	F	Mercyhurst
Ben Nelson	F	Quinnipiac
Alexandre Parent	F	Sacred Heart

2005–06
Player	Pos	Team
Dan Giffin	G	Canisius
Sean Erickson	D	Connecticut
Tim Manthey	D	Army
Bear Trapp	F	Sacred Heart
Anthont Canzoneri	F	Bentley
Jeff Gumear	F	Bentley
Chris Trafford	F	Mercyhurst

2006–07
Player	Pos	Team
Louis Menard	G	RIT
Cullen Eddy	D	Mercyhurst
Al Mazur	D	RIT
Anton Kharin	F	RIT
Josh Heidinger	F	Canisius
Owen Meyer	F	Army

2007–08
Player	Pos	Team
Joe Calvi	G	Bentley
Jeff Terminesi	D	Mercyhurst
Mark Znutas	D	Holy Cross
Everett Sheen	F	Holy Cross
Vincent Scarsella	F	Canisius
Erik Peterson	F	Bentley

2008–09
Player	Pos	Team
Kyle Rank	G	Bentley
Marcel Alvarez	D	Army
Scott Mathis	D	Air Force
David Kostuch	F	Canisius
Phil Ginand	F	Mercyhurst
Tyler Brenner	F	RIT

==== 2010s ====
2009–10
Player	Pos	Team
Steven Legato	G	Sacred Heart
Alex Greke	D	Connecticut
Christopher Tanev	D	RIT
Joe Campanelli	F	Bentley
Eric Delong	F	Sacred Heart
Adam Pleskach	F	American International

2010–11
Player	Pos	Team
Jason Torf	G	Air Force
Jeffrey Reppucci	D	Holy Cross
Adam McKenzie	D	Air Force
Taylor Holstrom	F	Mercyhurst
Ryan Rashid	F	Niagara
Cole Schneider	F	Connecticut

2011–12
Player	Pos	Team
Matt Ginn	G	Holy Cross
Tyson Wilson	D	Robert Morris
Tyler Shiplo	D	Mercyhurst
Alex Grieve	F	Bentley
Dan Bahntge	F	Mercyhurst
Brett Switzer	F	Bentley

2012–13
Player	Pos	Team
	G	
Matt Blomquist	D	Bentley
Karl Beckman	D	Holy Cross
Andrew Gladiuk	F	Bentley
Joe Kozlak	F	Army
Chris Porter	F	American International

2013–14
Player	Pos	Team
Chris Truehl	G	Air Force
Vinny Muto	D	Niagara
Mitch Nylen	D	Sacred Heart
C. J. Reuschlein	F	Army
David Norris	F	American International
Justin Danforth	F	Sacred Heart

2014–15
Player	Pos	Team
Jayson Argue	G	Bentley
Keegan Harper	D	Niagara
Brady Norrish	D	RIT
Tyler Pham	F	Army
Jack Riley	F	Mercyhurst
Brady Ferguson	F	Robert Morris

2015–16
Player	Pos	Team
Shane Starrett	G	Air Force
Tanner Jago	D	Bentley
Lester Lancaster	D	Mercyhurst
Gabriel Valenzuela	F	RIT
Derek Barach	F	Mercyhurst
Matt Serratore	F	Air Force

2016–17
Player	Pos	Team
Frank Marotte	G	Robert Morris
Adam Brubacher	D	RIT
Alexander Wilkinson	D	Army
Nick Hutchinson	F	Canisius
Ryner Gorowsky	F	Bentley
Dominic Franco	F	Army

2017–18
Player	Pos	Team
Stefano Durante	G	American International
Brennan Kapcheck	D	American International
Jon Zimmerman	D	Army
Luke Santerno	F	Bentley
Grant Meyer	F	Canisius
Marc Johnstone	F	Sacred Heart

2018–19
Player	Pos	Team
Josh Benson	G	Sacred Heart
Josh McDougall	D	Mercyhurst
Matt Slick	D	Holy Cross
Austin Magera	F	Sacred Heart
Ludwig Stenlund	F	Niagara
Anthony Vincent	F	Holy Cross

==== 2020s ====
2019–20
Player	Pos	Team
Chad Veltri	G	Niagara
Anthony Firriolo	D	Army
Brandon Koch	D	Air Force
Elijiah Gonsalves	F	RIT
Matt Gosiewski	F	Bentley
Braeden Tuck	F	Sacred Heart

2020–21
East
Player	Pos	Team
Nick Grabko	G	Bentley
Nico Somerville	D	American International
Drew Bavaro	D	Bentley
Lincoln Hatten	F	Army
Aaron Grounds	F	American International
Eric Otto	F	American International
West
Player	Pos	Team
Noah West	G	Robert Morris
Brian Kramer	D	Robert Morris
Josef Mysak	D	Niagara
Randy Hernández	F	Robert Morris
Carson Brière	F	Mercyhurst
Austin Heidemann	F	Mercyhurst

2021–22
Player	Pos	Team
Tommy Scarfone	G	RIT
Luis Lindner	D	American International
Mitchell Digby	D	Air Force
Carter Wilkie	F	RIT
Clayton Cosentino	F	Air Force
Shane Ott	F	Niagara

2022–23
Player	Pos	Team
Owen Say	G	Mercyhurst
Chris Hedden	D	Air Force
Mack Oliphant	D	Holy Cross
Max Itagaki	F	Army
Nicholas Niemo	F	Bentley
Marcus Joughin	F	Sacred Heart

2023–24
Player	Pos	Team
Nils Wallstrom	G	American International
Mac Gadowsky	D	Army
Trent Sambrook	D	Mercyhurst
Matteo Giampa	F	Canisius
Boris Skalos	F	Mercyhurst
Jack Stockfish	F	Holy Cross

==== Rookie Team All-Stars by school ====
School	Winners
Bentley	18
Mercyhurst	18
Sacred Heart	13
Army	13
RIT	11
Air Force	10
American International	10
Holy Cross	10
Canisius	7
Niagara	7
Connecticut	6
Robert Morris	6
Quinnipiac	3

== See also ==
- All-Atlantic Hockey America teams
- Atlantic Hockey Awards
- MAAC Awards
