= Atlantic Hockey Player of the Year =

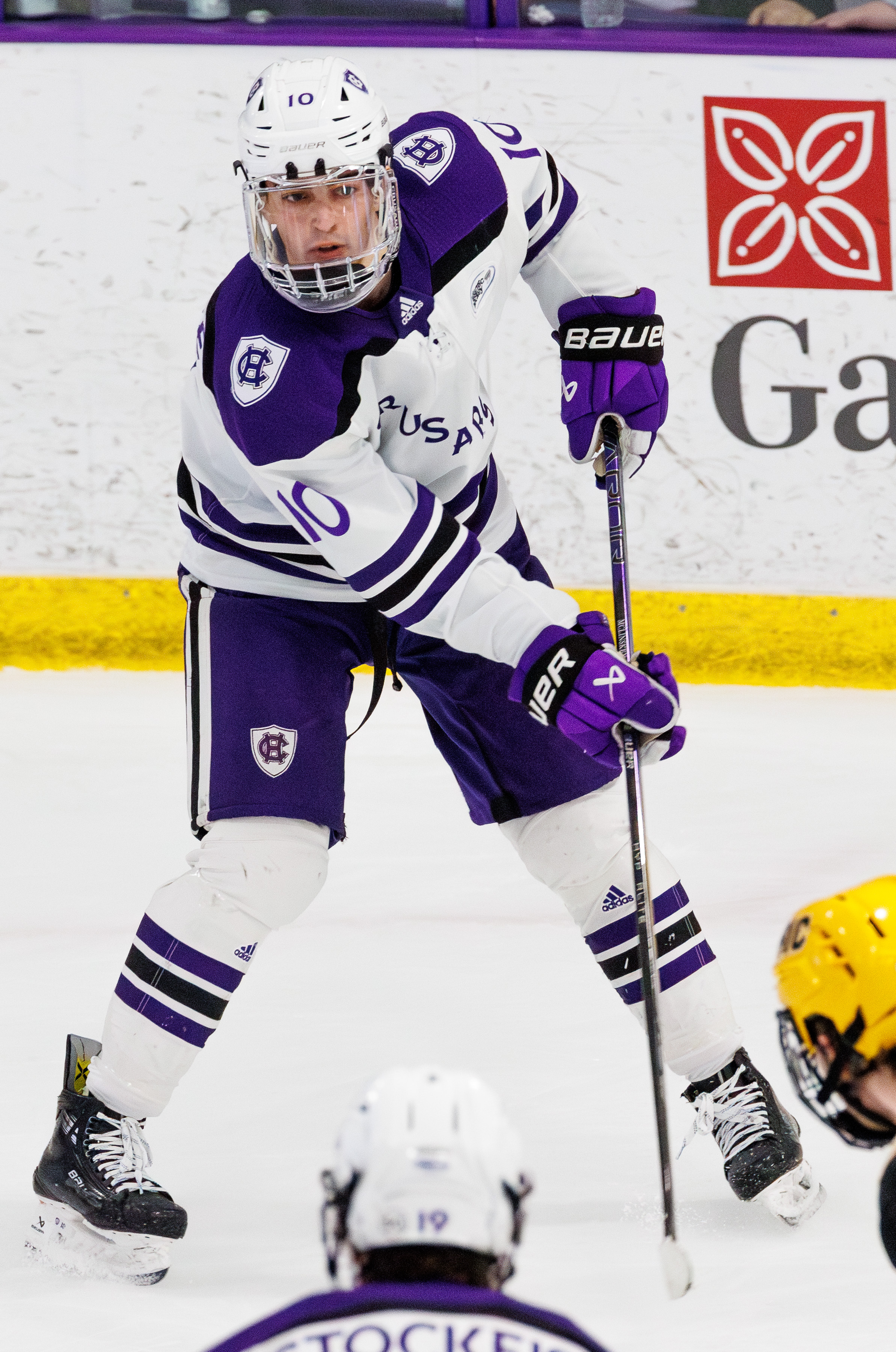
- Liam McLinskey, 2024 player of the year
- Sport: Ice hockey
- Awarded for: The Player of the Year in the Atlantic Hockey Association

History
- First award: 2004
- Final award: 2024
- Most recent: Liam McLinskey

The Atlantic Hockey Player of the Year was an annual award given out at the conclusion of the Atlantic Hockey regular season to the best player in the conference as voted by the coaches of each Atlantic Hockey team.

== Award winners ==
Year	Winner	Position	School
2003–04	Tim Olsen	Forward	Connecticut
2004–05	Reid Cashman	Defenceman	Quinnipiac
2005–06	Tyler McGregor	Right Wing	Holy Cross
2006–07	Eric Ehn	Forward	Air Force
2007–08	Josh Kassel	Goaltender	Army
2008–09	Jacques Lamoureux	Center	Air Force
2009–10	Cory Conacher	Left Wing	Canisius
2010–11	Paul Zanette	Left Wing	Niagara
2011–12	Tim Kirby	Defenceman	Air Force
2012–13	Carsen Chubak	Goaltender	Niagara
2013–14	Jimmy Sarjeant	Goaltender	Mercyhurst
2014–15	Matt Garbowsky	Center	RIT

Year	Winner	Position	School
2015–16	Zac Lynch	Right Wing	Robert Morris
2016–17	Charles Williams	Goaltender	Cansius
2017–18	Dylan McLaughlin	Forward	Cansius
2018–19	Joseph Duszak	Defenceman	Mercyhurst
2019–20	Jason Cotton	Forward	Sacred Heart
2020–21	Brennan Kapcheck	Defenceman	American International
2020–21	Will Calverley	Center	Robert Morris
2020–21	Nick Prkusic	Forward	RIT
2021–22	Chris Theodore	Left Wing	American International
2022–23	Carter Wilkie	Right Wing	RIT
2023–24	Liam McLinskey	Forward	Holy Cross

=== Winners by school ===
School	Winners
Air Force	3
Canisius	3
RIT	3
American International	2
Holy Cross	2
Mercyhurst	2
Niagara	2
Robert Morris	2
Army	1
Connecticut	1
Quinnipiac	1
Sacred Heart	1

=== Winners by position ===
Position	Winners
Center	2
Right Wing	3
Left Wing	3
Forward	6
Defenceman	4
Goaltender	4

== See also ==
- Atlantic Hockey Awards
- MAAC Offensive Player of the Year
- MAAC Defensive Player of the Year
