= 2004–05 NCAA Division I men's ice hockey rankings =

- NCAA tournament: 2005
- NCAA champion: Denver
- Preseason No. 1 (USA Today): Boston College
- Preseason No. 1 (USCHO): Michigan
- NCAA Division I men's ice hockey rankings

Two human polls made up the 2004–05 NCAA Division I men's ice hockey rankings, the USCHO.com Division I Men's Poll and the USA TODAY/American Hockey Magazine Poll. As the 2004–05 season progressed, rankings were updated weekly. There were a total of 34 voters in the USA Today poll and 40 voters in the USCHO.com poll. Each first place vote in either poll is worth 15 points in the rankings with every subsequent vote worth 1 fewer point.

== Legend ==
	Increase in ranking
	Decrease in ranking
	Not ranked previous week
(Italics)	Number of first place votes
#–#–#	Win–loss–tie record
†	Tied with team above or below also with this symbol

== USA TODAY/American Hockey Magazine Poll ==
	Preseason Sep 27	Week 1 Oct 4	Week 2 Oct 11	Week 3 Oct 18	Week 4 Oct 25	Week 5 Nov 1	Week 6 Nov 8	Week 7 Nov 15	Week 8 Nov 22	Week 9 Nov 29	Week 10 Dec 6	Week 11 Dec 13	Week 12 Dec 20	Week 13 Jan 3	Week 14 Jan 10	Week 15 Jan 17	Week 16 Jan 24	Week 17 Jan 31	Week 18 Feb 7	Week 19 Feb 14	Week 20 Feb 21	Week 21 Feb 28	Week 22 Mar 7	Week 23 Mar 14	Week 24 Mar 21	Week 25 Mar 28	Final Apr 11	
1	Boston College (9)	Michigan (17) 0–0–0	Boston College (16) 0–0–0	Boston College (18) 1–0–0	Minnesota-Duluth (26) 5–0–1	Boston College (27) 3–1–0	Boston College (33) 4–1–0	Boston College (31) 4–1–1	Michigan (30) 9–2–1	Minnesota (32) 10–3–0	Minnesota (29) 11–4–0	Minnesota (29) 13–4–0	Minnesota (29) 13–4–0	Minnesota (29) 16–4–0	Colorado College (34) 18–3–1	Colorado College (34) 20–3–1	Boston College (27) 15–3–3	Boston College (26) 17–3–4	Boston College (23) 17–3–5	Boston College (20) 18–4–5	Colorado College (10) 25–6–3	Colorado College (15) 25–6–3	Colorado College (16) 26–7–3	Colorado College (24) 28–7–3	Denver (18) 28–9–2	Denver (33) 30–9–2	Denver (34) 32–9–2	1
2	Michigan (16)	Boston College (11) 0–0–0	North Dakota (13) 2–0–0	North Dakota (14) 3–0–1	Boston College (3) 2–1–0	Minnesota-Duluth (3) 5–1–2	Michigan; 7–2–1	Michigan (1) 7–2–1	Wisconsin (1) 9–3–0	Wisconsin; 10–4–0	Colorado College; 11–3–0	Colorado College (5) 13–3–0	Colorado College (5) 15–3–0	Colorado College (5) 16–3–1	Boston College; 11–3–3	Boston College; 14–3–3	Colorado College (6) 20–4–2	Colorado College (8) 22–4–2	Colorado College (11) 23–4–3	Denver (9) 21–6–2	Denver (10) 22–7–2	Cornell (17) 22–4–3	Cornell (15) 22–4–3	Denver (3) 26–9–2	Boston College (6) 25–6–7	Colorado College (1) 31–8–3	Colorado College; 31–9–3	2
3	North Dakota (1)	Maine (2) 1–0–0	Minnesota; 1–0–0	Minnesota-Duluth (2) 3–0–1	North Dakota (2) 4–1–1	Michigan (1) 5–2–1	Minnesota (1) 7–2–0	Minnesota (2) 7–2–0	Minnesota (1) 8–3–0	Boston College; 6–2–2	Wisconsin (5) 12–4–0	Michigan; 13–4–1	Michigan; 13–4–1	Boston College; 9–3–3	Michigan; 16–5–1	Michigan; 18–5–1	Wisconsin; 19–6–1	Wisconsin; 19–6–1	Denver; 20–6–1	Colorado College (5) 24–5–3	Cornell (12) 20–4–3	Denver (2) 23–8–2	Denver (2) 24–9–2	Cornell (7) 24–4–3	Cornell (8) 26–4–3	North Dakota; 24–14–5	North Dakota; 25–15–5	3
4	Maine	Minnesota-Duluth; 0–0–0	Michigan (3) 1–1–0	Michigan; 2–1–1	Michigan (1) 4–1–1	Minnesota (2) 5–2–0	North Dakota; 5–3–2	Wisconsin; 7–3–0	Boston College (2) 4–2–2	Colorado College (2) 10–2–0	Michigan; 11–4–1	Wisconsin; 13–5–0	Wisconsin; 13–5–0	Michigan; 14–5–1	Minnesota; 16–7–0	Minnesota; 18–7–0	Michigan (1) 19–6–1	Denver; 18–6–1	Wisconsin; 20–7–1	Cornell; 18–4–3	Michigan (2) 24–7–3	Michigan; 24–7–3	Michigan (1) 26–7–3	Boston College; 23–6–7	Colorado College (2) 29–8–3	Minnesota; 28–14–1	Minnesota; 28–15–1	4
5	Minnesota-Duluth (2)	North Dakota; 0–0–0	Minnesota-Duluth (2) 1–0–1	Maine; 3–2–0	Wisconsin (1) 4–0–0	Wisconsin (1) 5–1–0	Colorado College; 5–1–0	Colorado College; 6–2–0	Colorado College; 8–2–0	Michigan; 9–4–1	Boston College; 6–3–3	Boston College; 7–3–3	Boston College; 7–3–3	Denver; 13–5–1	Wisconsin; 15–6–1	Wisconsin; 17–6–1	Denver; 16–6–1	Michigan; 20–7–1	Cornell; 16–4–3	Wisconsin; 20–8–2	Boston College; 19–6–5	Boston College; 20–6–6	Boston College; 21–6–7	Michigan; 28–7–3	Michigan; 30–7–3	Cornell; 27–5–3	Cornell; 27–5–3	5
6	Wisconsin (2)	Denver (4) 0–0–0	Wisconsin; 0–0–0	Wisconsin; 2–0–0	Minnesota; 3–2–0	North Dakota; 4–2–2	Wisconsin; 5–3–0	New Hampshire; 5–2–1	New Hampshire; 8–2–1	North Dakota; 9–5–2	Denver; 10–5–0	New Hampshire; 11–3–2	New Hampshire; 11–3–2	New Hampshire; 12–4–2	New Hampshire; 14–4–2	Denver; 14–6–1	New Hampshire; 16–5–2	Cornell; 15–4–2	Michigan; 20–7–3	Michigan; 22–7–3	Wisconsin; 21–9–2	Ohio State; 23–8–3	Minnesota; 24–12–1	Minnesota; 26–12–1	New Hampshire; 25–10–5	Michigan; 31–8–3	Michigan; 31–8–3	6
7	Denver (4)	Minnesota; 0–0–0	New Hampshire; 2–0–0	Minnesota; 2–1–0	New Hampshire; 3–1–1	New Hampshire; 3–1–1	New Hampshire; 4–2–1	Minnesota-Duluth; 5–3–2	North Dakota; 7–5–2	New Hampshire; 8–3–2	New Hampshire; 10–3–2	Denver; 10–5–0	Denver; 11–5–1	Wisconsin; 13–6–1	Denver; 14–6–1	New Hampshire; 15–5–2	Minnesota; 18–9–0	New Hampshire; 17–6–3	Ohio State; 20–7–3	Ohio State; 22–7–3	New Hampshire; 22–7–3	Wisconsin; 21–10–3	Ohio State; 24–8–4	New Hampshire; 24–9–5	Minnesota; 26–14–1	Boston College; 26–7–7	Boston College; 26–7–7	7
8	Minnesota	Wisconsin; 0–0–0	Maine; 1–2–0	Miami; 4–0–0	Colorado College; 4–0–0	Colorado College; 4–0–0	Cornell; 4–0–0	Ohio State; 9–3–0	Maine; 9–6–0	Denver; 8–5–0	Ohio State; 11–4–1	North Dakota; 11–7–2	North Dakota; 13–7–2	North Dakota; 13–7–2	Boston University; 13–7–0	Cornell; 11–4–2	Cornell; 13–4–2	Ohio State; 18–7–3	New Hampshire; 18–7–3	New Hampshire; 20–7–3	Ohio State; 23–8–3	New Hampshire; 22–8–4	Boston University; 21–11–4	Ohio State; 26–9–4	Ohio State; 27–10–4	New Hampshire; 26–11–5	New Hampshire; 26–11–5	8
9	Michigan State	Michigan State; 0–0–0	Miami; 2–0–0	Michigan State; 1–1–0	Maine; 4–3–0	Maine; 5–4–0	Maine; 6–5–0	Cornell; 4–1–1	Denver; 6–5–0	Maine; 9–6–1	North Dakota; 10–6–2	Ohio State; 11–5–2	Cornell; 7–2–2	Ohio State; 12–5–3	Colgate; 15–5–0	Colgate; 17–5–0	Ohio State; 16–7–3	Minnesota; 19–10–0	Minnesota; 20–11–0	Harvard; 15–6–2	Massachusetts-Lowell; 19–7–4	Minnesota; 22–12–1	Wisconsin; 21–11–4	Harvard; 20–8–3	Harvard; 21–9–3	Ohio State; 27–11–4	Ohio State; 27–11–4	9
10	New Hampshire	New Hampshire; 0–0–0	Michigan State; 0–0–0	New Hampshire; 2–1–1	Miami; 4–2–0	Denver; 4–3–0	Minnesota-Duluth; 5–3–2	North Dakota; 5–5–2	Boston University; 7–3–0	Ohio State; 9–4–1	Maine; 10–6–2	Cornell; 7–2–2	Ohio State; 11–5–2	Cornell; 8–3–2	North Dakota; 14–8–2	Ohio State; 15–6–3	Colgate; 18–6–0	Harvard; 12–5–2	Harvard; 14–5–2	Minnesota; 20–12–1	Boston University; 20–10–2	Boston University; 20–11–3	New Hampshire; 22–9–5	Boston University; 23–12–4	Boston University; 23–13–4	Harvard; 21–10–3	Harvard; 21–10–3	10
11	Dartmouth	Dartmouth; 0–0–0	Denver; 0–1–0	Colorado College; 2–0–0	Denver; 3–2–0	Northern Michigan; 4–1–1	Northern Michigan; 5–1–2	Denver; 5–4–0	Ohio State; 9–4–1	Vermont; 8–4–3	Vermont; 9–4–3	Vermont; 9–5–3	Harvard; 9–3–1	Harvard; 9–4–2	Vermont; 13–6–3	Boston University; 13–9–0	Harvard; 10–5–2	Colgate; 19–7–0	Massachusetts-Lowell; 16–6–4	Boston University; 17–10–2	Harvard; 17–7–2	Harvard; 18–8–3	Harvard; 18–8–3	Wisconsin; 23–12–4	North Dakota; 22–14–5	Maine; 20–13–7	Maine; 20–13–7	11
12	Colorado College	Colorado College; 0–0–0	Colorado College; 0–0–0	Dartmouth; 0–0–0	Dartmouth; 0–0–0	Cornell; 2–0–0	Denver; 4–3–0	Maine; 7–6–0	Minnesota-Duluth; 6–4–2	Cornell; 5–2–2	Cornell; 7–2–2	Colgate; 12–4–0	Vermont; 10–5–3	Vermont; 11–6–3	Ohio State; 13–6–3	North Dakota; 14–10–2	North Dakota; 14–10–2	Massachusetts-Lowell; 15–6–3	Colgate; 19–8–1	Colgate; 20–8–2	Minnesota; 20–12–1	Maine; 18–10–6	Maine; 18–11–7	Maine; 20–11–7	Maine; 20–12–7	Boston University; 23–14–4	Boston University; 23–14–4	12
13	Ohio State	Ohio State; 0–0–0	Dartmouth; 0–0–0	Denver; 1–2–0	Ohio State; 4–2–0	St. Lawrence; 4–3–1	Ohio State; 7–3–0	Northern Michigan; 5–3–2	Northern Michigan; 5–3–2	Colgate; 10–4–0	Colgate; 12–4–0	Harvard; 9–3–1	Boston University; 10–6–0	Boston University; 11–7–0	Cornell; 9–4–2	Harvard; 10–5–2	Massachusetts-Lowell; 14–5–3	Boston University; 15–10–1	Boston University; 15–10–2	Massachusetts-Lowell; 17–7–4	Colgate; 22–8–2	Massachusetts-Lowell; 19–9–4	Northern Michigan; 20–9–7	North Dakota; 20–13–5	Wisconsin; 23–13–4	Wisconsin; 23–14–4	Wisconsin; 23–14–4	13
14	Cornell	Cornell; 0–0–0	Massachusetts-Lowell; 1–0–0	Colgate; 4–0–0	Michigan State; 1–3–0	Ohio State; 5–3–0	Colgate; 7–2–0	Colgate; 7–3–0	Cornell; 4–2–2	Minnesota-Duluth; 7–5–2	Boston University; 9–6–0	Maine; 10–7–2	Colgate; 12–4–0	Colgate; 13–5–0	Harvard; 10–5–2	Vermont; 13–7–3	Boston University; 13–10–1	North Dakota; 15–10–3	Maine; 15–9–6	Maine; 15–9–6	Maine; 16–10–6	Northern Michigan; 18–9–7	Massachusetts-Lowell; 20–10–4	Colgate; 24–9–3	Colgate; 25–10–3	Colgate; 25–11–3	Colgate; 25–11–3	14
15	Massachusetts-Lowell	Miami; 0–0–0	Cornell; 0–0–0	Massachusetts-Lowell; 1–0–0	Northern Michigan; 3–1–0	Dartmouth; 1–1–0	St. Lawrence; 5–4–1	Boston University; 5–3–0	Colgate; 8–4–0	Northern Michigan; 6–4–2	Northern Michigan; 8–4–2	Boston University; 10–6–0	Maine; 10–7–2	Maine; 10–8–3	Maine; 11–8–3	Massachusetts-Lowell; 13–5–2	Maine; 13–8–5	Maine; 14–8–6	North Dakota; 15–12–3	North Dakota; 15–12–3	Northern Michigan; 16–9–7	Dartmouth; 17–10–2	North Dakota; 18–13–5	Northern Michigan; 22–10–7	Northern Michigan; 22–11–7	Bemidji State †; 23–13–1	Bemidji State; 23–13–1	15
16																										Mercyhurst †; 18–16–4		16
	Preseason Sep 27	Week 1 Oct 4	Week 2 Oct 11	Week 3 Oct 18	Week 4 Oct 25	Week 5 Nov 1	Week 6 Nov 8	Week 7 Nov 15	Week 8 Nov 22	Week 9 Nov 29	Week 10 Dec 6	Week 11 Dec 13	Week 12 Dec 20	Week 13 Jan 3	Week 14 Jan 10	Week 15 Jan 17	Week 16 Jan 24	Week 17 Jan 31	Week 18 Feb 7	Week 19 Feb 14	Week 20 Feb 21	Week 21 Feb 28	Week 22 Mar 7	Week 23 Mar 14	Week 24 Mar 21	Week 25 Mar 28	Final Apr 11	
		Dropped: Massachusetts-Lowell; 0–0–0	Dropped: Ohio State; 0–2–0	Dropped: Cornell; 0–0–0	Dropped: Colgate; 4–1–0; Massachusetts-Lowell; 1–2–0	Dropped: Miami; 4–4–0; Michigan State; 2–4–0	Dropped: Dartmouth; 2–2–0	Dropped: St. Lawrence; 5–6–1	Dropped: None	Dropped: Boston University; 7–6–0	Dropped: Minnesota-Duluth; 7–7–2	Dropped: Northern Michigan; 9–4–3	Dropped: None	Dropped: None	Dropped: None	Dropped: Maine; 12–8–4	Dropped: Vermont; 13–9–3	Dropped: None	Dropped: None	Dropped: None	Dropped: North Dakota; 16–13–3	Dropped: Colgate; 22–9–3	Dropped: Dartmouth; 19–11–2	Dropped: Massachusetts-Lowell; 20–12–4	Dropped: None	Dropped: Northern Michigan; 22–11–7	Dropped: Mercyhurst; 18–16–4	

== USCHO.com Division I Men's Poll ==
	Preseason Sep 27	Week 1 Oct 11	Week 2 Oct 18	Week 3 Oct 25	Week 4 Nov 1	Week 5 Nov 8	Week 6 Nov 15	Week 7 Nov 22	Week 8 Nov 29	Week 9 Dec 6	Week 10 Dec 13	Week 11 Dec 20	Week 12 Jan 3	Week 13 Jan 10	Week 14 Jan 17	Week 15 Jan 24	Week 16 Jan 31	Week 17 Feb 7	Week 18 Feb 14	Week 19 Feb 21	Week 20 Feb 28	Week 21 Mar 7	Week 22 Mar 14	Week 23 Mar 21	
1	Michigan (17)	North Dakota (22) 2–0–0	Boston College (22) 1–0–0	Minnesota-Duluth (31) 5–0–1	Boston College (35) 3–1–0	Boston College (38) 4–1–0	Boston College (37) 4–1–1	Michigan (35) 9–2–1	Minnesota (36) 10–3–0	Minnesota (27) 11–4–0	Minnesota (36) 13–4–0	Minnesota (33) 13–4–0	Minnesota (37) 16–4–0	Colorado College (39) 18–3–1	Colorado College (40) 20–3–1	Boston College (29) 15–3–3	Boston College (29) 17–3–4	Boston College (21) 17–3–5	Denver (22) 21–6–2	Denver (16) 22–7–2	Colorado College (12) 25–6–3	Colorado College (16) 26–7–3	Colorado College (26) 28–7–3	Denver (17) 28–9–2	1
2	Maine (9)	Boston College (13) 0–0–0	North Dakota (15) 3–0–1	Boston College (4) 2–1–0	Michigan; 5–2–1	Michigan (1) 7–2–1	Michigan (2) 7–2–1	Wisconsin (2) 9–3–0	Boston College (2) 6–2–2	Wisconsin (8) 12–4–0	Colorado College (4) 13–3–0	Colorado College (7) 15–3–0	Colorado College (3) 16–3–1	Boston College; 11–3–3	Boston College; 14–3–3	Colorado College (10) 20–4–2	Colorado College (10) 22–4–2	Colorado College (18) 23–4–3	Boston College (9) 18–4–5	Cornell (14) 20–4–3	Cornell (21) 22–4–3	Denver (4) 24–9–2	Denver (3) 26–9–2	Boston College (7) 25–6–7	2
3	Boston College (2)	Michigan (2) 1–1–0	Minnesota-Duluth (3) 3–0–1	Michigan; 4–1–1	Minnesota-Duluth (3) 5–1–2	Minnesota; 7–2–0	Minnesota (1) 7–2–0	Minnesota; 8–3–0	Colorado College (2) 10–2–0	Colorado College (3) 11–3–0	Michigan; 13–4–1	Michigan; 13–4–1	Boston College; 9–3–3	Michigan; 16–5–1	Michigan; 18–5–1	Wisconsin (1) 19–6–1	Wisconsin (1) 19–6–1	Denver (1) 20–6–1	Colorado College (8) 24–5–3	Colorado College (6) 25–6–3	Denver (4) 23–8–2	Cornell (16) 22–4–3	Cornell (10) 24–4–3	Colorado College (6) 29–8–3	3
4	Minnesota-Duluth (4)	Minnesota-Duluth (2) 1–0–1	Michigan; 2–1–1	North Dakota (3) 4–1–1	Minnesota; 5–2–0	Colorado College; 5–1–0	Wisconsin; 7–3–0	Boston College (3) 4–2–2	Wisconsin; 10–4–0	Michigan (1) 11–4–1	Wisconsin; 13–5–0	Wisconsin; 13–5–0	Michigan; 14–5–1	Minnesota (1) 16–7–0	Minnesota; 18–7–0	Michigan; 19–6–1	Denver; 18–6–1	Wisconsin; 20–7–1	Cornell (1) 18–4–3	Michigan (4) 24–7–3	Michigan (3) 24–7–3	Michigan (4) 26–7–3	Michigan † (1) 28–7–3	Cornell (8) 26–4–3	4
5	North Dakota (2)	Minnesota; 1–0–0	Maine; 3–2–0	Wisconsin; 4–0–0	Wisconsin; 5–1–0	North Dakota; 5–3–2	Colorado College; 6–2–0	Colorado College; 8–2–0	Michigan; 9–4–1	Boston College (1) 6–3–3	Boston College; 7–3–3	Boston College; 7–3–3	Denver; 13–5–1	Wisconsin; 15–6–1	Wisconsin; 17–6–1	Denver; 16–6–1	Michigan; 20–7–1	Cornell; 16–4–3	Michigan; 22–7–3	Boston College; 19–6–5	Boston College; 20–6–6	Boston College; 21–6–7	Boston College †; 23–6–7	Michigan (1) 30–7–3	5
6	Minnesota	Maine (1) 1–2–0	Miami; 4–0–0	Minnesota; 3–2–0	North Dakota; 4–2–2	Wisconsin; 5–3–0	New Hampshire; 5–2–1	New Hampshire; 8–2–1	North Dakota; 9–5–2	Denver; 10–5–0	New Hampshire; 11–3–2	New Hampshire; 11–3–2	Wisconsin; 13–6–1	New Hampshire; 14–4–2	Denver; 14–6–1	New Hampshire; 16–5–2	Cornell; 15–4–2	Michigan; 20–7–3	Wisconsin; 20–8–2	Wisconsin; 21–9–2	Wisconsin; 21–10–3	Minnesota; 24–12–1	Minnesota; 26–12–1	New Hampshire; 25–10–5	6
7	Denver (4)	Michigan State; 0–0–0	Minnesota †; 2–1–0	Maine; 4–3–0	Colorado College (1) 4–0–0	New Hampshire; 4–2–1	Ohio State; 9–3–0	North Dakota; 7–5–2	Denver; 8–5–0	New Hampshire; 10–3–2	Denver; 10–5–0	Denver; 11–5–1	New Hampshire; 12–4–2	Denver; 14–6–1	New Hampshire; 15–5–2	Minnesota; 18–9–0	New Hampshire; 17–6–2	Ohio State; 20–7–3	Ohio State; 22–7–3	New Hampshire; 22–7–3	New Hampshire; 22–8–4	Ohio State; 24–8–4	New Hampshire; 24–9–5	Minnesota; 26–14–1	7
8	Wisconsin (1)	New Hampshire; 2–0–0	Wisconsin †; 2–0–0	Colorado College; 4–0–0	New Hampshire; 3–1–1	Cornell (1) 4–0–0	Minnesota-Duluth; 5–3–2	Maine; 9–6–0	New Hampshire; 8–3–2	Ohio State; 11–4–1	North Dakota; 11–7–2	North Dakota; 13–7–2	North Dakota; 13–7–2	Boston University; 13–7–0	Colgate; 17–5–0	Cornell; 13–4–2	Minnesota; 19–10–0	New Hampshire; 18–7–3	New Hampshire; 20–7–3	Ohio State; 23–8–3	Ohio State; 23–8–3	Wisconsin; 21–11–4	Harvard; 20–8–3	Harvard; 21–9–3	8
9	Michigan State	Wisconsin; 0–0–0	Michigan State; 1–1–0	New Hampshire; 3–1–1	Maine; 5–4–0	Minnesota-Duluth; 5–3–2	Cornell †; 4–1–1	Ohio State; 9–4–1	Ohio State; 9–4–1	North Dakota; 10–6–2	Cornell; 7–2–2	Cornell; 7–2–2	Cornell; 8–3–2	North Dakota; 14–8–2	Cornell; 11–4–2	Colgate; 18–6–0	Ohio State; 18–7–3	Minnesota; 20–11–0	Harvard; 15–6–2	Boston University; 20–10–2	Minnesota; 22–12–1	Boston University; 21–11–4	Boston University; 23–12–4	Ohio State; 27–10–4	9
10	New Hampshire (1)	Miami; 2–0–0	New Hampshire; 2–1–1	Denver †; 3–2–0	Denver; 4–3–0	Maine; 6–5–0	North Dakota †; 5–5–2	Denver; 6–5–0	Maine; 9–6–1	Vermont; 9–4–3	Ohio State; 11–5–2	Harvard; 9–3–1	Ohio State; 12–5–3	Colgate; 15–5–0	Ohio State; 15–6–3	Ohio State; 16–7–3	Harvard; 12–5–2	Harvard; 14–5–2	Minnesota; 20–12–1	Massachusetts-Lowell; 19–7–4	Boston University; 20–11–3	New Hampshire; 22–9–5	Ohio State; 26–9–4	North Dakota (1) 22–14–5	10
11	Dartmouth	Denver; 0–1–0	Colorado College; 2–0–0	Miami †; 4–2–0	Northern Michigan; 4–1–1	Denver; 4–3–0	Denver; 5–4–0	Boston University; 7–3–0	Vermont; 8–4–3	Maine; 10–6–2	Harvard; 9–3–1	Ohio State; 11–5–2	Boston University; 11–7–0	Cornell; 9–4–2	Boston University; 13–9–0	Harvard; 10–5–2	Colgate; 19–7–0	Massachusetts-Lowell; 16–6–4	Boston University; 17–10–2	Harvard; 17–7–2	Harvard; 18–8–3	Harvard; 18–8–3	Wisconsin; 23–12–4	Boston University; 23–13–4	11
12	Ohio State	Dartmouth; 0–0–0	Dartmouth; 0–0–0	Dartmouth; 0–0–0	Cornell (1) 2–0–0	Northern Michigan; 5–1–2	Maine; 7–6–0	Minnesota-Duluth; 6–4–2	Cornell; 5–2–2	Cornell; 7–2–2	Colgate; 12–4–0	Colgate; 12–4–0	Harvard; 9–4–2	Ohio State; 13–6–3	North Dakota; 14–10–2	North Dakota; 14–10–2	Massachusetts-Lowell; 15–6–3	Colgate; 19–8–1	Colgate; 20–8–2	Minnesota; 20–12–1	Maine; 18–10–6	Maine †; 18–11–7	Maine; 20–11–7	Maine; 20–12–7	12
13	Cornell	Colorado College; 0–0–0	Denver; 1–2–0	Ohio State; 4–2–0	St. Lawrence; 4–3–1	Ohio State; 7–3–0	Northern Michigan; 5–3–2	Northern Michigan; 5–3–2	Colgate; 10–4–0	Colgate; 12–4–0	Boston University; 10–6–0	Boston University; 10–6–0	Colgate; 13–5–0	Vermont; 13–6–3	Harvard; 10–5–2	Massachusetts-Lowell; 14–5–3	North Dakota; 15–10–3	Boston University; 15–10–2	Massachusetts-Lowell; 17–7–4	Colgate; 22–8–2	Massachusetts-Lowell; 19–9–4	Northern Michigan †; 20–9–7	North Dakota; 20–13–5	Wisconsin; 23–13–4	13
14	Colorado College	Cornell; 0–0–0	Colgate; 4–0–0	Cornell; 0–0–0	Ohio State; 5–3–0	Colgate; 7–2–0	Michigan State; 5–4–1	Cornell; 4–2–2	Minnesota-Duluth; 7–5–2	Boston University; 9–6–0	Vermont; 9–5–3	Vermont; 10–5–3	Vermont; 11–6–3	Harvard; 10–5–2	Vermont; 13–7–3	Boston University; 13–10–1	Boston University; 15–10–1	Maine; 15–9–6	Maine; 15–9–6	Maine; 16–10–6	Northern Michigan; 18–9–7	North Dakota; 18–13–5	Colgate; 24–9–3	Colgate; 25–10–3	14
15	Miami	Massachusetts-Lowell; 0–1–0	Cornell; 0–0–0	Northern Michigan; 3–1–0	Nebraska-Omaha; 5–1–0	Alaska-Anchorage; 5–2–1	Boston University; 5–3–0	Vermont; 6–4–3	Northern Michigan; 6–4–2	Northern Michigan; 8–4–2	Maine; 10–7–2	Maine; 10–7–2	Maine; 10–8–3	Maine; 11–8–3	Massachusetts-Lowell; 13–5–2	Maine; 13–8–5	Maine; 14–8–6	North Dakota; 15–12–3	North Dakota; 15–12–3	Northern Michigan; 16–9–7	Dartmouth; 17–10–2	Massachusetts-Lowell; 20–10–4	Northern Michigan; 22–10–7	Dartmouth; 20–13–2	15
	Preseason Sep 27	Week 1 Oct 11	Week 2 Oct 18	Week 3 Oct 25	Week 4 Nov 1	Week 5 Nov 8	Week 6 Nov 15	Week 7 Nov 22	Week 8 Nov 29	Week 9 Dec 6	Week 10 Dec 13	Week 11 Dec 20	Week 12 Jan 3	Week 13 Jan 10	Week 14 Jan 17	Week 15 Jan 24	Week 16 Jan 31	Week 17 Feb 7	Week 18 Feb 14	Week 19 Feb 21	Week 20 Feb 28	Week 21 Mar 7	Week 22 Mar 14	Week 23 Mar 21	
		Dropped: Ohio State; 0–2–0	Dropped: Massachusettl-Lowell; 1–0–0	Dropped: Michigan State; 1–3–0; Colgate; 4–1–0	Dropped: Miami; 4–4–0; Dartmouth; 1–1–0	Dropped: St. Lawrence; 5–4–1; Nebraska-Omaha; 5–3–0	Dropped: Colgate; 7–3–0; Alaska-Anchorage; 5–4–1	Dropped: Michigan State; 5–6–1	Dropped: Boston University; 7–6–0	Dropped: Minnesota-Duluth; 7–7–2	Dropped: Northern Michigan; 9–4–3	Dropped: None	Dropped: None	Dropped: None	Dropped: Maine; 12–8–4	Dropped: Vermont; 13–9–3	Dropped: None	Dropped: None	Dropped: None	Dropped: North Dakota; 16–13–3	Dropped: Colgate; 22–9–3	Dropped: Dartmouth; 19–11–2	Dropped: Massachusetts-Lowell; 20–12–4	Dropped: Northern Michigan; 22–11–7	
