= Reid Cashman =

American ice hockey player and coach

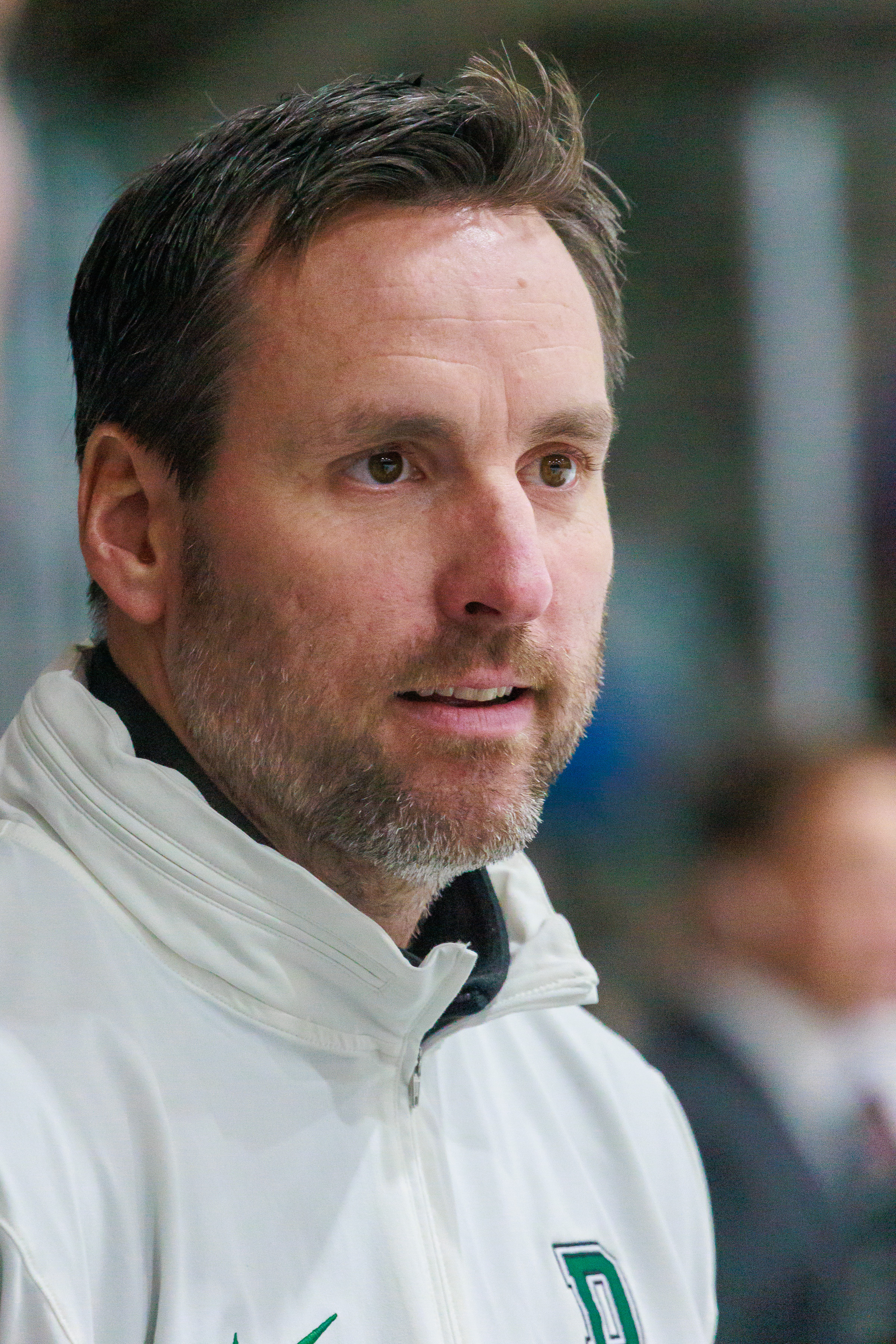
- Cashman in 2024
- Born: March 14, 1983 (age 43) Red Wing, Minnesota, U.S.
- Height: 6 ft 2 in (188 cm)
- Weight: 205 lb (93 kg; 14 st 9 lb)
- Position: Defense
- Shot: Left
- Played for: AHL; Toronto Marlies; Wilkes-Barre/Scranton Penguins; Milwaukee Admirals; ECHL; Columbia Inferno; Wheeling Nailers; Cincinnati Cyclones; Austria; EHC Black Wings Linz
- NHL draft: Undrafted
- Playing career: 2007–2011 Coaching career

Current position
- Title: Head coach
- Team: Dartmouth
- Conference: ECAC Hockey

Biographical details
- Education: Quinnipiac University

Coaching career (HC unless noted)
- 2011–2016: Quinnipiac (assistant)
- 2016–2018: Hershey Bears (assistant)
- 2018–2020: Washington Capitals (assistant)
- 2020–present: Dartmouth

Head coaching record
- Overall: 66–77–16 (.465)

Accomplishments and honors

Awards
- 2× Tim Taylor Award (2024, 2026); Spencer Penrose Award (2026)

Reid Cashman (born March 14, 1983) is an American former professional ice hockey defenseman, who currently serves as the head coach for the Dartmouth Big Green of the NCAA.

== Career ==
Cashman attended Quinnipiac University, where he was a standout defenseman for the Quinnipiac Bobcats men's ice hockey team, recording 23 goals and 125 assists for 148 points in 151 career games with the Bobcats. Upon graduation, Cashman was signed by the Toronto Maple Leafs of the National Hockey League, and was assigned to play with their American Hockey League (AHL) affiliate, the Toronto Marlies. During his AHL career, Cashman also skated with the Wilkes-Barre/Scranton Penguins and Milwaukee Admirals. In the ECHL Cashman suited up with the Wheeling Nailers, Columbia Inferno, and Cincinnati Cyclones, before heading to Austria to complete his playing career with the EHC Black Wings Linz.

== Head coaching record ==
Record table
Season	Team	Overall	Conference	Standing	Postseason
Dartmouth Big Green (ECAC Hockey) (2020–present)
2021–22	Dartmouth	7–22–3	5–15–2	T–11th	ECAC First Round
2022–23	Dartmouth	5–24–1	4–17–1	12th	ECAC First Round
2023–24	Dartmouth	13–10–6	9–6–7	4th	ECAC Semifinals
2024–25	Dartmouth	18–13–2	12–9–1	5th	ECAC Semifinals
2025–26	Dartmouth	23–8–4	14–5–4	2nd	NCAA Regional Semifinals
Dartmouth:		66–77–16	44–52–15		
Total:		66–77–16			
National champion Postseason invitational champion Conference regular season champion Conference regular season and conference tournament champion Division regular season champion Division regular season and conference tournament champion Conference tournament champion

== Awards and honors ==
Award	Year
Atlantic Hockey All-Rookie Team	2003–04
All-Atlantic Hockey Second Team	2003–04
All-Atlantic Hockey First Team	2004–05
Hobey Baker Award Top 10 Finalist	2004–05
All-ECAC Hockey First Team	2005–06
AHCA East Second-Team All-American	2005–06
All-ECAC Hockey First Team	2006–07
AHCA East First-Team All-American	2006–07
ECAC Hockey All-Decade Second Team	2000 - 2009

Awards and achievements
Preceded by Tim Olsen	Atlantic Hockey Player of the Year; 2004–05	Succeeded by Tyler McGregor
Preceded by Rand Pecknold; Jean-François Houle	Tim Taylor Award; 2023–24; 2025–26	Succeeded by Jean-François Houle; Incumbent
Preceded by Pat Ferschweiler	Spencer Penrose Award; 2025–26	Succeeded by Incumbent
