= Ohio Hockey Classic =

College hockey tournament

The Ohio Hockey Classic was a Division I men's college ice hockey tournament hosted annually during the NCAA Division I men's ice hockey season by the Ohio State Buckeyes men's ice hockey program.

The first classic was held during the 2004–05 season when Colorado College won in a shootout. The first three years of the tournament were held at Nationwide Arena, and has been held at Ohio State's home arena Value City Arena every year since. The Miami Redhawks along with Ohio State have participated in every Ohio Hockey Classic.

Just four days after the 2009 tournament ended, Ohio State coach John Markell stated the tournament will be discontinued due to lack of sponsorship.

== Format ==
The classic is a four-team tournament. In 2004, both night one's and two's matchups were predetermined. Since then, night one's winners play each other for the tournament's title, and the first night's losers play each other as a consolation. If a game is tied after the completion of a five-minute overtime period, the teams participate in a shootout which is only for the purpose of deciding a champion for the tournament. The first two classics came down to a shootout.

== Results ==
Year	Winning team	Runner-up	Location	Venue	Reference
2004	Colorado College	Ohio State	Columbus, Ohio	Nationwide Arena	
2005	Miami (OH)	Ohio State	Columbus, Ohio	Nationwide Arena	
2006	Ohio State	Miami (OH)	Columbus, Ohio	Nationwide Arena	
2007	Miami (OH)	Ohio State	Columbus, Ohio	Value City Arena	
2009^{[{{{2}}}]}	Ohio State	Clarkson	Columbus, Ohio	Value City Arena	

- ^{[{{{2}}}]} The tournament is normally in the last week of December. Due to Christmas falling on a Thursday, the 2008 tournament was pushed to the first weekend of 2009.
