= Eric Ehn =

American ice hockey player (born 1984)

- Born: January 29, 1984 (age 41) Dexter, Michigan, U.S.
- Height: 5 ft 10 in (178 cm)
- Weight: 170 lb (77 kg; 12 st 2 lb)
- Position: Forward
- Shot: Right
- Played for: Bakersfield Condors
- NHL draft: Undrafted
- Playing career: 2008–2009

Eric Ehn (born January 29, 1984) is a former American professional ice hockey player. Ehn played college hockey at Air Force, where he was named a was named a Second Team All-American in 2007. After graduating from Air Force, Ehn played for the Bakersfield Condors of the ECHL.

== Awards and honors ==
Award	Year
All-CHA Rookie Team	2004–05
All-CHA Second Team	2005–06
All-Atlantic Hockey First Team	2006–07
AHCA East First-Team All-American	2006–07
All-Atlantic Hockey Third Team	2007–08

Awards and achievements
Preceded by Tyler McGregor	Atlantic Hockey Player of the Year; 2006-07	Succeeded by Josh Kassel
