= Atlantic Hockey =

NCAA Men's Division I Ice Hockey conference

Atlantic Hockey Association
- Formerly: MAAC (1997–2003)
- Association: NCAA
- Founded: 1997 (as MAAC Hockey); 2003 (as Atlantic Hockey)
- Commissioner: Michelle Morgan (since 2023)
- Sports fielded: Men's ice hockey
- Division: Division I
- No. of teams: 11
- Headquarters: Boston, Massachusetts
- Region: Northeastern United States and Colorado
- Most recent champion: RIT (4th title)
- Most titles: Air Force (7)
- Website: http://www.atlantichockeyonline.com/

Locations

The Atlantic Hockey Association (AHA) was an NCAA Men's Division I Ice Hockey conference which operated primarily in the northeastern United States. It participated in the NCAA's Division I as an ice hockey-only conference. Unlike several other college athletic conferences, Atlantic Hockey had no women's division, though it shared some organizational and administrative roles (and three universities) with the women's-only College Hockey America (CHA).

It was formed in 1997 and began play in the 1998–1999 season as the hockey division of the Metro Atlantic Athletic Conference (MAAC; now known as the Metro Conference). Within three years, it was granted an automatic bid to the NCAA tournament. However, in 2003, Iona and Fairfield dropped hockey, leaving Canisius as the only full MAAC member that sponsored hockey. This proved somewhat problematic for MAAC Hockey, since conference bylaws only allowed full members to vote. On June 30, 2003, MAAC Hockey broke off from the MAAC and reorganized as Atlantic Hockey.

On June 6, 2023, it was announced that Atlantic Hockey would be merging all operations with CHA, effective in 2024. Details regarding this merger, including whether the new league would carry the Atlantic or College Hockey name, were to be announced at a later date. Shortly after the 2024 season, the new conference was announced as Atlantic Hockey America.

== Membership ==
=== Final ===
| Institution | Location | Nickname | Founded | Affiliation | Undergraduate Enrollment | Joined | Women's Conference | Primary Conference | Colors |
|---|---|---|---|---|---|---|---|---|---|
| United States Air Force Academy | USAF Academy, Colorado (Note: The Academy grounds lie almost entirely outside the Colorado Springs city limits. The U.S. Census Bureau and U.S. Postal Service respectively call the grounds "Air Force Academy" and "USAF Academy".) | Falcons | 1954 | Public/Federal | 4,400 | 2006 | N/A | Mountain West | |
| American International College | Springfield, Massachusetts | Yellow Jackets | 1885 | Private/Non-sectarian | 1,700 | 1998 | N/A | Northeast-10 (D-II) | |
| United States Military Academy | West Point, New York | Black Knights | 1802 | Public/Federal | 4,400 | 2000 | N/A | Patriot League | |
| Bentley University | Waltham, Massachusetts | Falcons | 1917 | Private/Non-sectarian | 3,958 | 1999 | N/A | Northeast-10 (D-II) | |
| Canisius University | Buffalo, New York | Golden Griffins | 1870 | Private/Catholic | 3,490 | 1998 | N/A | MAAC | |
| College of the Holy Cross | Worcester, Massachusetts | Crusaders | 1843 | Private/Catholic | 2,897 | 1998 | HEA | Patriot League | |
| Mercyhurst University | Erie, Pennsylvania | Lakers | 1926 | Private/Catholic | 4,055 | 1999 | CHA | NEC | |
| Niagara University | Lewiston, New York (Note: The campus mailing address is "Niagara University".) | Purple Eagles | 1856 | Private/Catholic | 3,853 | 2010 | N/A (Note: Niagara's women's team was in College Hockey America before the university dropped the program in 2012.) | MAAC | |
| Robert Morris University | Moon Township, Pennsylvania | Colonials | 1921 | Private/Non-sectarian | 4,005 | 2010; 2023 (Note: Robert Morris was a member of Atlantic Hockey from 2010 to 2021 until the program was cut. Subsequent fundraising efforts allowed the program to be reinstated for the 2023–24 season with Robert Morris rejoining Atlantic Hockey.) | CHA (Note: RMU also rejoined its former women's hockey home of College Hockey America in 2023–24.) | Horizon | |
| Rochester Institute of Technology | Henrietta, New York (Note: The campus mailing address is Rochester.) | Tigers | 1829 | Private/Non-sectarian | 16,842 | 2006 | CHA | Liberty League (D-III) | |
| Sacred Heart University | Fairfield, Connecticut | Pioneers | 1963 | Private/Catholic | 5,428 | 1998 | NEWHA (Note: The NEWHA was founded in 2017 as a scheduling alliance between Division I and Division II women's ice hockey independents, with Sacred Heart as a founding member. It formally organized as a conference in 2018 and received NCAA recognition in 2019.) | MAAC | |

Locations of Atlantic Hockey Conference current member locations.

=== Previous ===
- Iona University (dropped hockey), 2003; then known as Iona College
- Fairfield University (dropped hockey), 2003
- Quinnipiac University (ECAC Hockey), 2005
- University of Connecticut (Hockey East), 2014

== Atlantic Hockey champions ==
| Season | Tournament | Regular Season Champion | Tournament Champion | Notes |
|---|---|---|---|---|
| 2003–04 | 2004 | Holy Cross (1) | Holy Cross (1) | Atlantic Hockey Association founded by American International, Army, Bentley, Canisius, Connecticut, Holy Cross, Mercyhurst, Quinnipiac and Sacred Heart |
| 2004–05 | 2005 | Quinnipiac (1) | Mercyhurst (1) | Final AHA season for Quinnipiac, (leaving for the ECAC) |
| 2005–06 | 2006 | Holy Cross (2) | Holy Cross (2) | |
| 2006–07 | 2007 | RIT (1) | Air Force (1) | Air Force and RIT join the AHA |
| 2007–08 | 2008 | Army (1) | Air Force (2) | |
| 2008–09 | 2009 | RIT(2) / Air Force (1) | Air Force (3) | |
| 2009–10 | 2010 | RIT (3) | RIT (1) | |
| 2010–11 | 2011 | RIT (4) | Air Force (4) | Niagara and Robert Morris join the AHA |
| 2011–12 | 2012 | Air Force (2) | Air Force (5) | |
| 2012–13 | 2013 | Niagara (1) | Canisius (1) | |
| 2013–14 | 2014 | Mercyhurst (1) | Robert Morris (1) | Final AHA season for Connecticut, (leaving for Hockey East) |
| 2014–15 | 2015 | Robert Morris (1) | RIT (2) | |
| 2015–16 | 2016 | Robert Morris (2) | RIT (3) | |
| 2016–17 | 2017 | Canisius (1) | Air Force (6) | |
| 2017–18 | 2018 | Mercyhurst (2) | Air Force (7) | |
| 2018–19 | 2019 | American International (1) | American International (1) | |
| 2019–20 | 2020 | American International (2) | Cancelled | Tournament cancelled after quarterfinals due to COVID-19 pandemic |
| 2020–21 | 2021 | American International (3) | American International (2) | |
| 2021–22 | 2022 | American International (4) | American International (3) | Robert Morris suspended its program prior to the start of the season |
| 2022–23 | 2023 | RIT (5) | Canisius (2) | |
| 2023–24 | 2024 | RIT (6) | RIT (4) | Robert Morris reinstated to Atlantic Hockey for this season after restarting its hockey programs |
| 2024–25 | 2025 | Holy Cross (3) | Bentley (1) | |

== Atlantic Hockey tournament champions by school ==
| School | Championship years |
|---|---|
| Air Force | 2007, 2008, 2009, 2011, 2012, 2017, 2018 |
| RIT | 2010, 2015, 2016, 2024 |
| American International | 2019, 2021, 2022 |
| Canisius | 2013, 2023 |
| Holy Cross | 2004, 2006 |
| Mercyhurst | 2005 |
| Robert Morris | 2014 |
| Bentley | 2025 |

No tournament was held in 2020 due to the Covid-19 pandemic.

== National tournament history ==
NCAA tournament
| Year | AHA Rep. | Opponent | Result |
|---|---|---|---|
| 2004 | Holy Cross | North Dakota | L 0–3 |
| 2005 | Mercyhurst | Boston College | L 4–5 |
| 2006 | Holy Cross | Minnesota | W 4–3 (OT) |
| 2006 | Holy Cross | North Dakota | L 2–5 |
| 2007 | Air Force | Minnesota | L 3–4 |
| 2008 | Air Force | Miami (OH) | L 2–3 (OT) |
| 2009 | Air Force | Michigan | W 2–0 |
| 2009 | Air Force | Vermont | L 2–3 (2OT) |
| 2010 | RIT | Denver | W 2–1 |
| 2010 | RIT | New Hampshire | W 6–2 |
| 2010 | RIT | Wisconsin | L 1–8 |
| 2011 | Air Force | Yale | L 1–2 (OT) |
| 2012 | Air Force | Boston College | L 0–2 |
| 2013 | Niagara * | North Dakota | L 1–2 |
| 2013 | Canisius | Quinnipiac | L 3–4 |
| 2014 | Robert Morris | Minnesota | L 3–7 |
| 2015 | RIT | Minnesota State | W 2–1 |
| 2015 | RIT | Omaha | L 0–4 |
| 2016 | RIT | Quinnipiac | L 0–4 |
| 2017 | Air Force | Western Michigan | W 5–4 |
| 2017 | Air Force | Harvard | L 2–3 |
| 2018 | Air Force | St. Cloud State | W 4–1 |
| 2018 | Air Force | Minnesota-Duluth | L 1–2 |
| 2019 | AIC | St. Cloud State | W 2–1 |
| 2019 | AIC | Denver | L 0–3 |
| 2020 | None† | N/A | N/A |
| 2021 | AIC | North Dakota | L 1–5 |
| 2022 | AIC | Michigan | L 3–5 |
| 2023 | Canisius | Minnesota | L 2–9 |
| 2024 | RIT | Boston University | L 3–6 |

* – at-large selection.

† – Tournament canceled due to COVID-19 pandemic

== Conference arenas ==
| School | Hockey Arena | Location | Capacity |
|---|---|---|---|
| Air Force | Cadet Ice Arena | Colorado Springs, CO | 2,502 |
| American International | MassMutual Center | Springfield, MA | 6,866 |
| Army | Tate Rink | West Point, NY | 2,648 |
| Bentley | Bentley Arena | Waltham, MA | 1,917 |
| Canisius | LECOM Harborcenter | Buffalo, NY | 1,800 |
| Holy Cross | Hart Center | Worcester, MA | 1,600 |
| Mercyhurst | Mercyhurst Ice Center; Erie Insurance Arena (alternate) | Erie, PA | 1,500; 6,833 |
| Niagara | Dwyer Arena | Lewiston, NY | 1,400 |
| RIT | Gene Polisseni Center; Blue Cross Arena (alternate) | Henrietta, NY; Rochester, NY | 4,300; 10,556 |
| Robert Morris | Clearview Arena | Neville Township, PA | 1,200 |
| Sacred Heart | Martire Family Arena | Fairfield, CT | 3,600 |

== Awards ==
At the conclusion of each regular season schedule the coaches of each Atlantic Hockey team vote which players they choose to be on the three or four All-Conference teams: first team, second team and rookie team (third team beginning in 2007). Additionally they vote to award 7 of the 10 individual trophies to an eligible player (or coach) and 1 team award at the same time. Atlantic Hockey also awards a regular season goaltending award and regular season scoring title that are not voted on, as well as a Conference Tournament Most Valuable Player, which is voted on at the conclusion of the conference tournament. All individual and team awards except Goaltender of the Year have been awarded since Atlantic Hockey's inaugural season in 2003–04.

=== All-Conference teams ===
| Award | Inaugural year |
|---|---|
| First Team | 2003–04 |
| Second Team | 2003–04 |
| Third Team | 2006–07 |
| Rookie Team | 2003–04 |

=== Individual awards ===
| Award | Inaugural year |
|---|---|
| Player of the Year | 2003–04 |
| Goaltender of the Year | 2023–24 |
| Rookie of the Year | 2003–04 |
| Coach of the Year | 2003–04 |
| Best Defensive Forward | 2003–04 |
| Best Defenseman | 2003–04 |
| Individual Sportsmanship | 2003–04 |
| Regular Season Goaltending Award | 2003–04 |
| Regular Season Scoring Trophy | 2003–04 |
| Most Valuable Player in Tournament | 2003–04 |

=== Team awards ===
| Award | Inaugural year |
|---|---|
| Team Sportsmanship Award | 2003–04 |

=== Atlantic Hockey Hall of Honor ===
In 2023, in honor of its 20th anniversary, the conference selected the top 20 players from its history:

1. Eric Ehn, F, Air Force
2. Jacques Lamoureaux, F, Air Force
3. Brett Gensler, F, Bentley
4. Cory Conacher, F, Canisius
5. Brady Ferguson, F, Robert Morris
6. Dan Ringwald, D, RIT
7. Andrew Volkening, F, Air Force
8. Colin Bilek, F, Army
9. Shane Madolora, G, RIT
10. Cody Wydo, F, Robert Morris
11. Zac Lynch, F, Robert Morris
12. Matt Garbowsky, F, RIT
13. Pierre-Luc O'Brien, F, Sacred Heart
14. Brennan Kapcheck, D, American International
15. Joseph Duszak, D, Mercyhurst
16. James Sixsmith, F, Holy Cross
17. Jared DeMichiel, G, RIT
18. Zach McKelvie, D, Army
19. Jamie Hunt, D, Mercyhurst
20. Justin Danforth, F, Sacred Heart

=== See also ===
- MAAC Awards
