= 2020–21 Atlantic Hockey season =

Ice Hockey season

- Season: 2020–21
- Conference: Atlantic Hockey
- Division: Division I
- Sport: ice hockey
- Duration: November 19, 2020– March 26, 2021
- Number of teams: 11

Regular season
- Season champions: American International
- Season MVP: Brennan Kapcheck; Will Calverley; Nick Prkusic
- Top scorer: Will Calverley

Atlantic Hockey Tournament
- Tournament champions: American International
- Runners-up: Canisius
- Tournament MVP: Justin Cole
- Top scorer: Mason Krueger

NCAA tournament
- Bids: 1
- Record: 0–1
- Best Finish: Regional semifinal
- Team(s): American International

The 2020–21 Atlantic Hockey season was the 18th season of play for Atlantic Hockey and took place during the 2020–21 NCAA Division I men's ice hockey season. The start of the regular season was delayed until November 19, 2020 and concluded on February 27, 2021.

== Season ==
=== COVID-19 ===
The entire Atlantic Hockey season was held under the cloud of the COVID-19 pandemic. The season's start was delayed for more than a month while university and health officials could decide on a safe way to play games. In the end, the conference was divided into two regions, East and West, with the two groups of teams only playing one another. This was done to reduce the amount of travel and exposure that the players and staff members would experience throughout the season. As a result of this arrangement, the conference standings would not be altered, however, tournament seeding would continue with east and west teams until the semifinal round.

=== Non-Conference ===
Unlike other seasons, the 20-21 season would see only a small number of non-conference games being played. This, like many other alterations, was due to COVID-19. This would cause the Pairwise Rankings, which were normally used to determine the at-large bids for the NCAA tournament, to be rendered useless. However, due to the perception of Atlantic Hockey as the weakest of the six Division I conferences, only the eventual tournament champion would go on to make the national tournament.

== Standings ==
2020–21 Atlantic Hockey Standings
	Conference record											Overall record					
	GP	W	L	T	OW	OL	SW	PTS	PT%	GF	GA	GP	W	L	T	GF	GA
#15 American International †*	12	11	1	0	1	0	0	32	.889	47	18	19	15	4	0	67	40
Army	15	10	4	1	3	1	1	30	.667	42	33	22	15	6	1	71	48
Robert Morris	15	10	5	0	2	1	0	29	.644	58	48	24	15	9	0	85	69
Canisius	13	8	5	0	1	1	0	24	.615	42	34	17	11	6	0	59	46
RIT	13	7	5	1	0	0	1	23	.590	43	40	20	9	9	2	68	70
Sacred Heart	13	6	6	1	1	2	0	20	.513	35	38	18	6	10	2	43	59
Mercyhurst	16	7	8	1	1	1	1	23	.479	54	50	21	8	12	1	64	67
Bentley	15	4	11	0	1	5	0	16	.356	35	48	16	5	11	0	42	51
Niagara	15	3	9	3	0	2	1	15	.333	39	53	22	7	12	3	57	70
Air Force	13	3	9	1	2	1	0	9	.231	32	49	14	3	10	1	35	56
Holy Cross	12	3	9	0	2	0	0	7	.194	22	38	16	4	12	0	30	52
Championship: March 20, 2021 † indicates conference regular season champion * indicates conference tournament champion (Riley Trophy); Rankings: USCHO.com Top 20 Poll

== Coaches ==
=== Records ===
Team	Head coach	Season at school	Record at school	Atlantic Hockey record
Air Force	Frank Serratore	24	407–368–92	208–120–63
American International	Eric Lang	5	67–69–14	57–42–13
Army	Brian Riley	17	189–294–81	157–208–75
Bentley	Ryan Soderquist	19	247–325–81	187–195–72
Canisius	Trevor Large	4	41–56–13	34–39–10
Holy Cross	Bill Riga	6	80–104–34	70–68–30
Mercyhurst	Rick Gotkin	33	564–447–95	227–178–55
Niagara	Jason Lammers	4	40–59–12	33–39–12
RIT	Wayne Wilson	22	382–265–71	209–131–48
Robert Morris	Derek Schooley	16	191–153–42	125–99–39
Sacred Heart	C. J. Marottolo	12	136–227–43	109–158–37

== Statistics ==
=== Leading scorers ===
GP = Games played; G = Goals; A = Assists; Pts = Points; PIM = Penalty minutes

Player	Position	Team	GP	G	A	Pts	PIM
Nick Prkusic	Senior	Robert Morris	26	8	19	27	14
Randy Hernández	Freshman	Robert Morris	26	11	16	27	2
Grant Herbert	Junior	Robert Morris	26	8	15	23	18
Will Calverley	Junior	RIT	17	9	13	22	4
Keaton Mastrodonato	Sophomore	Canisius	20	11	11	22	6
Carson Brière	Freshman	Mercyhurst	22	5	16	21	10
Jake Hamacher	Senior	RIT	19	6	13	19	4
Elijah Gonsalves	Sophomore	RIT	19	8	10	18	22
Nick Jenny	Senior	Robert Morris	26	6	12	18	4
Brennan Kapcheck	Senior	American International	15	0	17	17	8
Dan Willett	Senior	RIT	19	4	13	17	8

=== Leading goaltenders ===
Minimum 1/3 of team's minutes played in conference games.
GP = Games played; Min = Minutes played; GA = Goals against; SO = Shutouts; SV% = Save percentage; GAA = Goals against average

Player	Class	Team	GP	Min	GA	SO	SV%	GAA
Trevin Kozlowski	Senior	Army	14	773	25	0	.922	1.94
Stefano Durante	Senior	American International	9	491	17	0	.906	2.07
Chad Veltri	Sophomore	Niagara	16	976	38	0	.924	2.33
Zack LaRocque	Senior	Air Force	10	377	15	0	.910	2.39
Jacob Barczewski	Senior	Canisius	16	718	29	0	.923	2.42

== Conference tournament ==
Teams are reseeded for the semifinals

First round March 8–9
E4	Bentley	7
E5	Air Force	3
W4	Mercyhurst	2
W5	Niagara	3

Quarterfinals; March 12–14
E1	American International	—	—	—
E4	~~Bentley~~	—	—	—
East Division
E2	Army	4	4***	—
E3	Sacred Heart	0	3	—
W1	Robert Morris	3*	2	1
W5	Niagara	2	3**	2
West Division
W2	Canisius	5	6	—
W3	RIT	2	2	—

Semifinals; March 19
E1	American International	2
W5	Niagara	1
E2	Army	3
W2	Canisius	4*

Championship; March 20
E1	American International	5
W2	Canisius	2

Note: * denotes overtime period(s)

== NCAA tournament ==
=== Midwest Regional semifinal ===
March 26, 2021; 7:30 PM	(1) North Dakota	5 – 1 (4–0, 0–0, 1–1)	(4) American International	Scheels Arena, Fargo, North Dakota; Attendance: 1,435

Game reference

Adam Scheel
Goalies
Stefano Durante (20 min)
Jake Kucharski (40 min)
Referees:
Bobby Lukkason
Brady Johnson
Linesmen:
Tyler Landman
Nathan Voll

(Bernard-Docker, Sanderson) Jasper Weatherby (13) – 08:58	1–0
(unassisted) Jasper Weatherby (14) – GW – 11:54	2–0
(Kleven, Caulfield) Grant Mismash (10) – 14:16	3–0
(Gaber, Bast) Collin Adams (12) – 16:22	4–0
	4–1	57:46 – Tobias Fladeby (10) (Theodore, Callahan)
(Kawaguchi) Collin Adams (13) – 58:08	5–1

12 min
Penalties
12 min
33
Shots
25

== Ranking ==
=== USCHO ===
Team	Pre	1	2	3	4	5	6	7	8	9	10	11	12	13	14	15	16	17	18	19	20	Final
Air Force	NR	NR	NR	NR	NR	NR	NR	NR	NR	NR	NR	NR	NR	NR	NR	NR	NR	NR	NR	NR	N/A	NR
American International	NR	NR	NR	NR	NR	NR	19	20	19	20	20	19	17	15	16	16	16	16	15	15	N/A	15
Army	NR	NR	NR	NR	NR	NR	NR	NR	NR	NR	NR	NR	NR	NR	NR	NR	NR	NR	19	NR	N/A	NR
Bentley	NR	NR	NR	NR	NR	NR	NR	NR	NR	NR	NR	NR	NR	NR	NR	NR	NR	NR	NR	NR	N/A	NR
Canisius	NR	NR	NR	NR	NR	NR	NR	NR	NR	NR	NR	NR	NR	NR	NR	NR	NR	NR	NR	NR	N/A	NR
Holy Cross	NR	NR	NR	NR	NR	NR	NR	NR	NR	NR	NR	NR	NR	NR	NR	NR	NR	NR	NR	NR	N/A	NR
Mercyhurst	NR	NR	NR	NR	NR	NR	NR	NR	NR	NR	NR	NR	NR	NR	NR	NR	NR	NR	NR	NR	N/A	NR
Niagara	NR	NR	NR	NR	NR	NR	NR	NR	NR	NR	NR	NR	NR	NR	NR	NR	NR	NR	NR	NR	N/A	NR
RIT	NR	NR	NR	NR	NR	NR	NR	NR	NR	NR	NR	NR	NR	NR	NR	NR	NR	NR	NR	NR	N/A	NR
Robert Morris	NR	NR	NR	NR	NR	20	NR	NR	20	17	17	NR	19	19	19	NR	NR	NR	NR	NR	N/A	NR
Sacred Heart	NR	NR	NR	NR	NR	NR	NR	NR	NR	NR	NR	NR	NR	NR	NR	NR	NR	NR	NR	NR	N/A	NR

USCHO did not release a poll in week 20.

=== USA Today ===
Team	Pre	1	2	3	4	5	6	7	8	9	10	11	12	13	14	15	16	17	18	19	20	Final
Air Force	NR	NR	NR	NR	NR	NR	NR	NR	NR	NR	NR	NR	NR	NR	NR	NR	NR	NR	NR	NR	NR	NR
American International	NR	NR	NR	NR	NR	NR	NR	NR	NR	NR	NR	NR	NR	14	15	15	15	15	15	14	15	15
Army	NR	NR	NR	NR	NR	NR	NR	NR	NR	NR	NR	NR	NR	NR	NR	NR	NR	NR	NR	NR	NR	NR
Bentley	NR	NR	NR	NR	NR	NR	NR	NR	NR	NR	NR	NR	NR	NR	NR	NR	NR	NR	NR	NR	NR	NR
Canisius	NR	NR	NR	NR	NR	NR	NR	NR	NR	NR	NR	NR	NR	NR	NR	NR	NR	NR	NR	NR	NR	NR
Holy Cross	NR	NR	NR	NR	NR	NR	NR	NR	NR	NR	NR	NR	NR	NR	NR	NR	NR	NR	NR	NR	NR	NR
Mercyhurst	NR	NR	NR	NR	NR	NR	NR	NR	NR	NR	NR	NR	NR	NR	NR	NR	NR	NR	NR	NR	NR	NR
Niagara	NR	NR	NR	NR	NR	NR	NR	NR	NR	NR	NR	NR	NR	NR	NR	NR	NR	NR	NR	NR	NR	NR
RIT	NR	NR	NR	NR	NR	NR	NR	NR	NR	NR	NR	NR	NR	NR	NR	NR	NR	NR	NR	NR	NR	NR
Robert Morris	NR	NR	NR	NR	NR	NR	NR	NR	NR	NR	NR	NR	NR	NR	NR	NR	NR	NR	NR	NR	NR	NR
Sacred Heart	NR	NR	NR	NR	NR	NR	NR	NR	NR	NR	NR	NR	NR	NR	NR	NR	NR	NR	NR	NR	NR	NR

== Awards ==
=== NCAA ===
AHCA All-American Teams
East First Team	Position	Team
Brennan Kapcheck	D	American International
East Second Team	Team	Position
Trevin Kozlowski	G	Army
Colin Bilek	F	Army
Will Calverley	F	RIT

=== Conference ===
==== East Pod ====
Award		Recipient
Player of the Year		Brennan Kapcheck, American International
Rookie of the Year		Lincoln Hatten, Army
Best Defensive Forward		Chris Dodero, American International
Best Defenseman		Brennan Kapcheck, American International
Individual Sportsmanship Award		Justin Cole, American International
Regular season Scoring Trophy		Jakov Novak, Bentley
Regular season Goaltending Award		Trevin Kozlowski, Army
Coach of the Year		Brian Riley, Army
All-Atlantic Hockey Teams
First Team	Position	Second Team
Trevin Kozlowski, Army	G	Stefano Durante, American International
Brennan Kapcheck, American International	D	John Zimmerman, Army
Thomas Farrell, Army	D	Matt Slick, Holy Cross
Colin Bilek, Army	F	Elijah Barriga, American International
Tobias Fladeby, American International	F	Chris Dodero, American International
Marc Johnstone, Sacred Heart	F	Braeden Tuck, Sacred Heart
Rookie Team	Position	
Nick Grabko, Bentley	G	
Nico Somerville, American International	D	
Drew Bavaro, Bentley	D	
Lincoln Hatten, Army	F	
Aaron Grounds, American International	F	
Eric Otto, American International	F	

==== West Pod ====
Award		Recipient
Player of the Year		Will Calverley, RIT
Player of the Year		Nick Prkusic, Robert Morris
Rookie of the Year		Randy Hernández, Robert Morris
Best Defensive Forward		Will Calverley, RIT
Best Defenseman		Nick Jenny, Robert Morris
Individual Sportsmanship Award		Nick Jenny, Robert Morris
Regular season Scoring Trophy		Will Calverley, RIT
Regular season Goaltending Award		Jacob Barczewski, Cansius
Coach of the Year		Derek Schooley, Robert Morris
All-Atlantic Hockey Teams
First Team	Position	Second Team
Jacob Barczewski, Cansius	G	Noah West, Robert Morris
—	G	Zach LaRocque, Air Force
Nick Jenny, Robert Morris	D	Joseph Maziarz, Mercyhurst
Dan Willett, RIT	D	Brendan Michaelian, Robert Morris
Will Calverley, RIT	F	Randy Hernández, Robert Morris
Nick Prkusic, Robert Morris	F	Jon Bendorf, Mercyhurst
Keaton Mastrodonato, Cansius	F	Carson Brière, Mercyhurst
Rookie Team	Position	
Noah West, Robert Morris	G	
Brian Kramer, Robert Morris	D	
Josef Mysak, Niagara	D	
Randy Hernández, Robert Morris	F	
Carson Brière, Mercyhurst	F	
Austin Heidemann, Mercyhurst	F	

=== Conference tournament ===
Tournament MVP
Justin Cole		American International
All-Tournament team
Player	Pos	Team
Stefano Durante	G	American International
Logan Gestro	D	Canisius
Brennan Kapcheck	D	American International
Elijiah Barriga	F	American International
Justin Cole	F	American International
J. D. Pogue	F	Canisius
