= 2021 Atlantic Hockey men's ice hockey tournament =

2021 Atlantic Hockey Men's ice hockey tournament
- Dates: March 8–20, 2021
- Teams: 10
- Finals site: MassMutual Center; Springfield, Massachusetts
- Champions: American International (2nd title)
- Winning coach: Eric Lang (2nd title)
- MVP: Justin Cole (American International)
- Atlantic Hockey Men's Ice Hockey Tournaments

The 2021 Atlantic Hockey Tournament was the 17th edition of the Atlantic Hockey Tournament. It was played between March 8 and March 20, 2021 entirely at home campus locations. On March 5, 2021, Holy Cross withdrew from the tournament due to a positive COVID test. This resulted in Sacred Heart receiving a bye into the quarterfinal round. First Round and Quarterfinal games took place at home venues while Semifinal a Championship games were held at the MassMutual Center, the home of American International. By winning the tournament, American International earned Atlantic Hockey's automatic bid to the 2021 NCAA Division I Men's Ice Hockey Tournament.

== Format ==
The tournament featured four rounds of play. The tournament participants were split into east- and west-brackets. In the first round, after the withdrawal of Holy Cross, the two lowest-seeded teams from each region, as determined by the conference regular season standings, played a single game with the winners advancing to the quarterfinals. The top six teams from the conference regular season standings received byes to the quarterfinals. There, the first seed from each region and the winner of the first round game of the same region and the second and the third seeds of each region will play single-elimination games, with the winners advancing to the semifinals. In the semifinals, the highest remaining seed of each region will play the lower remaining seed of the opposite region in single games, with the winners advancing to the championship game. The tournament champion will receive an automatic bid to the 2021 NCAA Division I Men's Ice Hockey Tournament.

== Conference standings ==
2020–21 Atlantic Hockey Standings
	Conference record											Overall record					
	GP	W	L	T	OW	OL	SW	PTS	PT%	GF	GA	GP	W	L	T	GF	GA
#15 American International †*	12	11	1	0	1	0	0	32	.889	47	18	19	15	4	0	67	40
Army	15	10	4	1	3	1	1	30	.667	42	33	22	15	6	1	71	48
Robert Morris	15	10	5	0	2	1	0	29	.644	58	48	24	15	9	0	85	69
Canisius	13	8	5	0	1	1	0	24	.615	42	34	17	11	6	0	59	46
RIT	13	7	5	1	0	0	1	23	.590	43	40	20	9	9	2	68	70
Sacred Heart	13	6	6	1	1	2	0	20	.513	35	38	18	6	10	2	43	59
Mercyhurst	16	7	8	1	1	1	1	23	.479	54	50	21	8	12	1	64	67
Bentley	15	4	11	0	1	5	0	16	.356	35	48	16	5	11	0	42	51
Niagara	15	3	9	3	0	2	1	15	.333	39	53	22	7	12	3	57	70
Air Force	13	3	9	1	2	1	0	9	.231	32	49	14	3	10	1	35	56
Holy Cross	12	3	9	0	2	0	0	7	.194	22	38	16	4	12	0	30	52
Championship: March 20, 2021 † indicates conference regular season champion * indicates conference tournament champion (Riley Trophy); Rankings: USCHO.com Top 20 Poll

== Bracket ==
Teams are reseeded for the semifinals

First round March 8–9
E4	Bentley	7
E5	Air Force	3
W4	Mercyhurst	2
W5	Niagara	3

Quarterfinals; March 12–14
E1	American International	—	—	—
E4	~~Bentley~~	—	—	—
East Division
E2	Army	4	4***	—
E3	Sacred Heart	0	3	—
W1	Robert Morris	3*	2	1
W5	Niagara	2	3**	2
West Division
W2	Canisius	5	6	—
W3	RIT	2	2	—

Semifinals; March 19
E1	American International	2
W5	Niagara	1
E2	Army	3
W2	Canisius	4*

Championship; March 20
E1	American International	5
W2	Canisius	2

Note: * denotes overtime period(s)

== Results ==
=== First round ===
==== (W4) Mercyhurst vs. (W5) Niagara ====
March 8, 2021; 5:00 PM	Mercyhurst	2 – 3 (1–0, 1–2, 0–1)	Niagara	Mercyhurst Ice Center, Erie, Pennsylvania; Attendance: 163

Game reference

Kyle McClellan
Goalies
Chad Veltri
Referees:
Michael Shubert
C.J. Hallman
Linesmen:
Joe Sherman
Brendan Lewis

(Schneider, Kitt) Josh McDougall (1) – 02:45	1–0
(Sheriff, Reifenberger) Carson Brière (5) – 22:07	2–0
	2–1	28:42 – PP – Ludwig Stenlund (6) (Evingson, Kendall)
	2–2	32:12 – Ryan Cox (7) (Stanley, Edgerton)
	2–3	55:53 – GW – Walker Sommer (6) (Herrmann, Stenlund)

4 min
Penalties
2 min
31
Shots
35

==== (E4) Bentley vs. (E5) Air Force ====
March 9, 2021; 5:05 PM	Bentley	7 – 3 (3–2, 2–1, 2–0)	Air Force	Bentley Arena, Waltham, Massachusetts; Attendance: 0

Game reference

Nicholas Grabko
Goalies
Zack LaRocque
Alex Schilling
Referees:
Brendan Blanchard
Ryan Sweeney
Linesmen:
Bobby Griffin
Anthony Valle

	0–1	00:20 – Willie Reim (6) (unassisted)
(Villella) Cole Kodsi (1) – 08:40	1–1
(Orysiuk) Jakov Novak (7) – 11:39	2–1
(Schlagenhauf) Joe Winkelmann (1) – 14:17	3–1
	3–2	17:39 – PP – Brandon Koch (3) (Levin)
	3–3	22:10 – PP – Max Harper (4) (Koch, Horn)
(Bavaro, Novak) Brendan Walkom (3) – GW – 32:15	4–3
(Walkom) Matt Gosiewski (6) – PP – 33:46	5–3
(Novak, Walkom) Matt Gosiewski (7) – EN – 58:16	6–3
(Novak) Brendan Walkom (4) – EN – 59:51	7–3

19 min
Penalties
4 min
27
Shots
31

=== Quarterfinals ===
==== (E1) American International vs. (E4) Bentley ====
Bentley withdrew from the tournament due to an increase of COVID-19 positive tests on campus. American International received a bye into the semifinal round.

==== (E2) Army vs. (E3) Sacred Heart ====
March 12, 2021; 5:05 PM	Army	4 – 0 (0–0, 0–0, 4–0)	Sacred Heart	Tate Rink, West Point, New York; Attendance: 102

Game reference

Trevin Kozlowski
Goalies
Luke Lush
Referees:
Brendan Blanchard
Casey Terreri
Linesmen:
Anthony Valle
Bobby Griffin

(Farrell, Krueger) Mitch Machlitt (5) – GW – 41:25	1–0
(Butte, Hatten) Ricky Lyle (2) – 45:17	2–0
(Krueger, Machlitt) Colin Bilek (17) – 53:08	3–0
(Zimmerman, Felker) Daniel Haider (2) – 53:30	4–0

6 min
Penalties
6 min
34
Shots
30

March 13, 2021; 5:05 pm	Army	4 – 3 (3OT) (0–1, 2–2, 1–0, 0–0, 0–0, 1–0)	Sacred Heart	Tate Rink, West Point, New York; Attendance: 96

Game reference

Trevin Kozlowski
Goalies
Josh Benson
Referees:
Andy O'Brien
Casey Terreri
Linesmen:
Anthony Valle
Bobby Griffin

	0–1	18:41 – PP – Braeden Tuck (6) (Johnstone, Magera)
	0–2	23:00 – PP – Austin Magera (7) (Johnstone, Godbout)
(Hatten, Haider) Eric Butte (6) – PP – 26:09	1–2
(Bilek, Firriolo) Mason Krueger (5) – 36:34	2–2
	2–3	38:54 – Patrick Dawson (1) (Johnstone, Lombardi)
(Machlitt, Krueger) Thomas Farrell (4) – 52:21	3–3
(Machlitt, Krueger) Colin Bilek (18) – GW – 113:20	4–3

10 min
Penalties
10 min
72
Shots
45

Army Won Series 2–0

==== (W1) Robert Morris vs. (W5) Niagara ====
March 12, 2021; 7:00 PM	Robert Morris	3 – 2 (OT) (0–1, 2–1, 0–0, 1–0)	Niagara	Clearview Arena, Neville Township, Pennsylvania; Attendance: 0

Game reference

Noah West
Goalies
Chad Veltri
Referees:
Michael Shubert
Joseph Genovese
Linesmen:
Hunter Pickard
Adam Tobias

	0–1	09:26 – Eric Cooley (4) (Naumovski, Zielinski)
(Kramer, Hebert) Aidan Spellacy (5) – 20:11	1–1
(Michaelian, Love) Jordan Timmons (9) – 29:20	2–1
	2–2	32:12 – PP – Justin Kendall (3) (Cooley, Cox)
(Hebert, Head) Darcy Walsh (2) – GW – 64:42	3–2

4 min
Penalties
2 min
36
Shots
25

March 13, 2021; 7:05 PM	Robert Morris	2 – 3 (2OT) (1–2, 1–0, 0–0, 0–0, 0–1)	Niagara	Clearview Arena, Neville Township, Pennsylvania; Attendance: 0

Game reference

Noah West
Goalies
Chad Veltri
Referees:
Michael Shubert
Joseph Genovese
Linesmen:
Hunter Pickard
Adam Tobias

	0–1	11:23 – Jack Billings (5) (Cooley)
(Prkusic, Hernandez) Justin Addamo (8) – PP – 16:03	1–1
	1–2	16:55 – Ludwig Stenlund (7) (Herrmann, Billings)
(Hernandez, Schaeffer) Nick Prkusic (7) – 26:41	2–2
	2–3	87:31 – GW – Jack Billings (6) (Stenlund, Edgerton)

8 min
Penalties
8 min
51
Shots
40

March 14, 2021; 7:05 PM	Robert Morris	1 – 2 (0–1, 0–1, 1–0)	Niagara	Clearview Arena, Neville Township, Pennsylvania; Attendance: 0

Game reference

Noah West
Goalies
Chad Veltri
Referees:
Michael Shubert
Joseph Genovese
Linesmen:
Hunter Pickard
Adam Tobias

	0–1	02:59 – Jack Billings (7) (Edgerton)
	0–2	23:51 – GW – Walker Sommer (7) (Evingson, Mysak)
(Jenny, Michaelian) Randy Hernandez (11) – EA – 59:48	1–2

19 min
Penalties
6 min
45
Shots
32

Niagara Won Series 2–1

==== (W2) Canisius vs. (W3) RIT ====
March 12, 2021; 7:05 PM	Canisius	5 – 2 (1–1, 4–1, 0–0)	RIT	LECOM Harborcenter, Buffalo, New York; Attendance: 89

Game reference

Jacob Barczewski
Goalies
Ian Andriano
Logan Drackett
Referees:
Chris Leavitt
William McGoldrick III
Linesmen:
Brendan Lewis
Joe Sherman

(Mastrodonato, Alger) Ryan Miotto (1) – 13:32	1–0
	1–1	14:48 – Will Calverley (12) (Walker, Willett)
(Gestro, Virtanen) Cooper Haar (1) – 23:32	2–1
(Martan, Miotto) David Melaragni (2) – GW – 28:39	3–1
(unassisted) J. D. Pogue (2) – SH – 31:42	4–1
	4–2	32:25 – PP – Dan Willett (3) (Gonsalves, Moretz)
(Lapid) Austin Alger (3) – 32:47	5–2

8 min
Penalties
2 min
23
Shots
37

March 13, 2021; 7:05 PM	Canisius	6 – 2 (1–2, 2–0, 3–0)	RIT	LECOM Harborcenter, Buffalo, New York; Attendance: 109

Game reference

Jacob Barczewski
Goalies
Logan Drackett
Referees:
Chris Leavitt
William McGoldrick III
Linesmen:
Brendan Lewis
Joe Sherman

(Meyer, Virtanen) Max Kouznetsov (3) – 02:50	1–0
	1–1	10:46 – PP – Jake Hamacher (7) (Gonsalves, Willett)
	1–2	14:51 – PP – Dan Willett (4) (Gonsalves, Hamacher)
(unassisted) Keaton Mastrodonato (9) – 23:39	2–2
(Lapid, Mastrodonato) Grant Meyer (2) – PP GW – 34:09	3–2
(Gravel, Gestro) Lee Lapid (5) – SH – 55:11	4–2
(Decker) Mitchell Martan (5) – EN – 57:22	5–2
(Martan, Mastrodonato) Ryan Miotto (2) – EN – 58:53	6–2

12 min
Penalties
10 min
25
Shots
31

Canisius Won Series 2–0

=== Semifinals ===
==== (E1) American International vs. (W5) Niagara ====
March 19, 2021; 2:00 PM	American International	2 – 1 (0–0, 0–1, 2–0)	Niagara	MassMutual Center, Springfield, Massachusetts; Attendance: 0

Game reference

Stefano Durante
Goalies
Chad Veltri
Referees:
Chris Leavitt
Michael Schubert
Linesmen:
Anthony Valle
Bobby Griffin

	0–1	37:50 – Walker Sommer (8) (unassisted)
(Galambos) Elijiah Barriga (6) – 51:22	1–1
(Baum, Kapcheck) Justin Cole (8) – GW – 54:19	2–1

2 min
Penalties
4 min
35
Shots
18

==== (E2) Army vs. (W2) Canisius ====
March 19, 2021; 7:05 PM	Army	3 – 4 (OT) (1–0, 0–2, 2–1, 0–1)	Canisius	MassMutual Center, Springfield, Massachusetts; Attendance: 0

Game reference

Trevin Kozlowski
Goalies
Jacob Barczewski
Referees:
Ryan Sweeney
Brendan Blanchard
Linesmen:
Shane Kanaly
Matthew Hallok

(Berkovitz, Farrell) Jake Felker (3) – 15:06	1–0
	1–1	26:02 – Simon Gravel (5) (Wareham)
	1–2	26:48 – PP – Mitchell Martan (6) (Lapid, Meyer)
(Krueger, Machlitt) Thomas Farrell (5) – 41:51	2–2
(Abdelnour, Hatten) Matt Berkovitz (1) – 49:56	3–2
	3–3	54:07 – Max Kouznetsov (4) (Gravel, Gestro)
	3–4	73:31 – GW – J. D. Pogue (5) (Haar, Long)

10 min
Penalties
4 min
29
Shots
31

=== Championship ===
==== (E1) American International vs. (W2) Canisius ====
March 20, 2021; 7:00 PM	American International	5 – 2 (0–1, 2–1, 3–0)	Canisius	MassMutual Center, Springfield, Massachusetts; Attendance: 0

Game reference

Stefano Durante
Goalies
Jacob Barczewski
Referees:
Ryan Sweeney
Michael Schubert
Linesmen:
Anthony Valle
Bobby Griffin

	0–1	08:40 – Kevin Obssuth (3) (Pogue, Long)
(Dodero, Baum) Justin Cole (9) – 21:21	1–1
	1–2	23:12 – Grant Meyer (3) (Melaragni)
(Theodore, Kapcheck) Elijiah Barriga (7) – PP – 34:41	2–2
(Fladeby, Kapcheck) Chris Theodore (4) – PP GW – 43:24	3–2
(Kapcheck, Otto) Chris Dodero (8) – EN – 57:52	4–2
(Revering) Zak Galambos (4) – EN – 58:36	5–2

2 min
Penalties
21 min
36
Shots
17

== Tournament awards ==
=== All-Tournament Team ===
- G: Stefano Durante (American International)
- D: Logan Gestro (Canisius)
- D: Brennan Kapcheck (American International)
- F: Elijiah Barriga (American International)
- F: Justin Cole* (American International)
- F: J. D. Pogue (Canisius)

* Most Valuable Player(s)
