= Trevin Kozlowski =

American ice hockey player (born 1997)

- Born: March 27, 1997 (age 29) Santa Clarita, California, USA
- Height: 6 ft 4 in (193 cm)
- Weight: 220 lb (100 kg; 15 st 10 lb)
- Position: Goaltender
- Caught: Left
- Played for: Iowa Wild
- NHL draft: Undrafted
- Playing career: 2021–2023

Trevin Kozlowski is an American professional ice hockey goaltender who is currently an unrestricted free agent. He most recently played for the Greenville Swamp Rabbits in the ECHL. He was an E-4 specialist in the Army Reserve and an All-American for Army.

== Playing career ==
Kozlowski attended The Gunnery, a prep school approximately 3,000 miles from his home town. Despite the distance, he was a star for the school's ice hockey team, being named the most valuable player and setting the shutout record as a senior. After graduating, he spent a season with the Salmon Arm Silverbacks while preparing for his entry into the United States Military Academy. After a less than stellar season of junior hockey, Kozlowski did not play at all as a freshman. As a sophomore, Kozlowski split time in goal with two other netminders. While each performed equally in goal, Jared Dempsey ended his playing career after the season and Kozlowski entered his junior season with only one teammate to beat out for the starting role. In 2020 he did just that and played in the vast majority of Army's games, posting some of the best numbers in the history of the program. Kozlowski backstopped the team to its best record in over a decade but couldn't build upon his success in the playoffs due to the cancellations caused by the COVID-19 pandemic.

While his senior season was curtailed due to the pandemic, Kozlowski continued to improve and got Army to post its best record in 25 years. Kozlowski posted the best goals against average in the 118-year history of the Black Knights and led the team to the cusp of its first ever NCAA Tournament appearance. While an overtime loss in the conference semifinal ultimately prevented Army from reaching the national tournament, Kozlowski's achievements were recognized and he was joined by teammate Colin Bilek for just the second time that the program had a player nemed to the All-American team.

After graduating, Kozlowski had an opportunity that few before him could claim. While the service academies typically required their graduates to perform 5 years of active service immediately after graduation, that changed in 2019. Then-Secretary of Defense Mark Esper changed the military's policy, allowing graduated to defer active service while pursuing professional sports careers. This allowed Kozlowski to sign a contract with the Iowa Wild after the season and continue his playing career.

During his first full season of professional hockey, Kozlowski played for the Iowa Heartlanders during their inaugural season. As a player he was entitled to receive two complimentary tickets to each home game and decided to give the seats to active or retired military members. The recipients of "Trevin's Tickets" would also be entitled to meet with Kozlowski after each game. Additionally, despite the difficulties presented by COVID-19, Kozlowski ties to find time to visit with former military personnel at the Iowa City VA Medical Center.

== Career statistics ==
			Regular season									Playoffs
Season	Team	League	GP	W	L	OT	MIN	GA	SO	GAA	SV%	GP	W	L	MIN	GA	SO	GAA	SV%
2016–17	Salmon Arm Silverbacks	BCHL	29	9	16	0	1538	102	1	3.98	.892	1	0	1	—	—	0	10.01	.762
2017–18	Army	AHA	—	—	—	—	—	—	—	—	—	—	—	—	—	—	—	—	—
2018–19	Army	AHA	14	5	6	2	758	34	0	2.69	.899	—	—	—	—	—	—	—	—
2019–20	Army	AHA	31	17	11	3	1854	68	1	2.20	.909	—	—	—	—	—	—	—	—
2020–21	Army	AHA	20	14	4	1	1253	40	2	1.91	.922	—	—	—	—	—	—	—	—
2020–21	Iowa Wild	AHL	1	0	1	0	59	3	0	3.04	.864	—	—	—	—	—	—	—	—
2021–22	Iowa Heartlanders	ECHL	23	9	11	2	1315	77	0	3.51	.899	—	—	—	—	—	—	—	—
2021–22	Iowa Wild	AHL	3	1	1	0	142	6	0	2.53	.918	—	—	—	—	—	—	—	—
2022–23	Iowa Heartlanders	ECHL	6	1	3	1	282	17	0	3.61	.869	—	—	—	—	—	—	—	—
2022–23	Greenville Swamp Rabbits	ECHL	1	0	1	0	59	4	0	4.06	.840	—	—	—	—	—	—	—	—
NCAA totals			65	36	21	6	3,865	142	3	2.18	.911	—	—	—	—	—	—	—	—

== Awards and honors ==
Award	Year
All-Atlantic Hockey First Team	2020–21
AHCA East Second Team All-American	2020–21

Awards and achievements
Preceded by Zackarias Skog	Atlantic Hockey Regular Season Goaltending Award; 2020–21; With: Jacob Barczewski	Succeeded by Jake Kucharski
