= Aidan McDonough =

American ice hockey player (born 1999)

- Born: November 6, 1999 (age 26) Milton, Massachusetts, U.S.
- Height: 6 ft 2 in (188 cm)
- Weight: 201 lb (91 kg; 14 st 5 lb)
- Position: Left wing
- Shoots: Left
- NHL team (P) Cur. team Former teams: Buffalo Sabres; Rochester Americans (AHL); Vancouver Canucks
- NHL draft: 195th overall, 2019; Vancouver Canucks
- Playing career: 2023–present

Aidan McDonough (born November 6, 1999) is an American professional ice hockey left wing for the Rochester Americans in the American Hockey League (AHL) while under contract to the Buffalo Sabres in the National Hockey League (NHL). McDonough was drafted 195th overall by the Vancouver Canucks in the 2019 NHL entry draft.

== Playing career ==
McDonough began his collegiate career for the Northeastern Huskies during the 2019–20 season, where he recorded 11 goals and 16 assists in 31 games. In eight games in February, McDonough led Hockey East in scoring with seven goals and 11 points. His five power-play goals were the most in the nation and his six power-play points led the league. He was subsequently named the Hockey East Co-Player of the Month for February.

During the 2020–21 season, he recorded ten goals and ten assists in 21 games, in a season that was shortened due to the COVID-19 pandemic. He posted seven goals and four assists in February and recorded his first career hat-trick on February 12, 2021. He was subsequently named the Hockey East Co-Player of the Month for February. Following the season he was awarded the Hockey East Three-Stars Award.

On June 10, 2021, he was named an assistant captain for the 2021–22 season. During his junior year he recorded 25 goals and 14 assists in 38 games. He led the Huskies in goals and ranked second in the NCAA, while his .66 goals per game ranked third in the NCAA. Following an outstanding season he was named to the All-Hockey East First Team and named an AHCA East First Team All-American.

On March 28, 2022, McDonough announced he would return to Northeastern for his senior year. In the 2022–23 season, McDonough was selected as team captain of the Huskies and completed his fourth season in leading led the team with 20 goals and 38 points through 34 games.

Having concluded his collegiate career, McDonough was promptly signed to a two-year, entry-level contract with the Vancouver Canucks on March 13, 2023.

At the conclusion of his entry-level contract, McDonough was not tendered a qualifying offer by the Canucks and was released as a free agent. On July 5, 2024, McDonough was signed to a one-year AHL contract with the Charlotte Checkers, the primary affiliate to the Florida Panthers, for the 2024–25 season.

McDonough left the Panthers after an injury hit lone season to sign a one-year AHL contract with the Wilkes-Barre/Scranton Penguins, affiliate to the Pittsburgh Penguins on July 2, 2025. McDonough regained his offensive touch in the 2025–26 season with the Penguins, posting 23 goals and 44 points in 65 games.

As a free agent at the conclusion of his contract with the Wilkes-Barre/Scranton, McDonough secured an NHL contract in signing a one-year, two-way contract with the Buffalo Sabres for the 2026–27 season on July 2, 2026.

== Career statistics ==
| | | | Regular season | | | | | Playoffs |
| Season | Team | League | GP | G | A | Pts | PIM | GP | G | A | Pts | PIM |
|---|---|---|---|---|---|---|---|---|---|---|---|---|
| 2014–15 | Thayer Academy | USHS | 24 | 4 | 4 | 8 | — | — | — | — | — | — |
| 2015–16 | Thayer Academy | USHS | 31 | 25 | 19 | 44 | — | — | — | — | — | — |
| 2016–17 | Thayer Academy | USHS | 30 | 22 | 27 | 49 | — | — | — | — | — | — |
| 2017–18 | Thayer Academy | USHS | 29 | 25 | 34 | 59 | — | — | — | — | — | — |
| 2018–19 | Cedar Rapids RoughRiders | USHL | 50 | 21 | 21 | 42 | 49 | 6 | 4 | 3 | 7 | 0 |
| 2019–20 | Northeastern University | HE | 31 | 11 | 16 | 27 | 10 | — | — | — | — | — |
| 2020–21 | Northeastern University | HE | 21 | 10 | 10 | 20 | 4 | — | — | — | — | — |
| 2021–22 | Northeastern University | HE | 38 | 25 | 14 | 39 | 44 | — | — | — | — | — |
| 2022–23 | Northeastern University | HE | 34 | 20 | 18 | 38 | 14 | — | — | — | — | — |
| 2022–23 | Vancouver Canucks | NHL | 6 | 1 | 0 | 1 | 2 | — | — | — | — | — |
| 2023–24 | Abbotsford Canucks | AHL | 58 | 11 | 8 | 19 | 10 | 2 | 0 | 0 | 0 | 0 |
| 2024–25 | Charlotte Checkers | AHL | 16 | 10 | 6 | 16 | 15 | — | — | — | — | — |
| 2025–26 | Wilkes-Barre/Scranton Penguins | AHL | 65 | 23 | 21 | 44 | 24 | 15 | 4 | 4 | 8 | 4 |
| NHL totals | | | 6 | 1 | 0 | 1 | 2 | — | — | — | — | — |

== Awards and honors ==
| Award | Year |
College
| All-Hockey East First Team | 2022, 2023 |
| AHCA East First Team All-American | 2022, 2023 |

Awards and achievements
| Preceded by John Leonard | Hockey East Three-Stars Award; 2020–21; With: Jonny Evans and Marc McLaughlin | Succeeded by Devon Levi |
