= Atlantic Hockey Regular Season Goaltending Award =

- Sport: Ice hockey
- Awarded for: The Best Goaltender in the Atlantic Hockey Association during the regular season

History
- First award: 2004
- Final award: 2024
- Most recent: Jason Grande

The Atlantic Hockey Regular Season Goaltending Award was an annual award given out at the conclusion of the Atlantic Hockey regular season to the best goaltender in the conference as determined by in-conference goals against average.

== Award winners ==
Year	Winner	School
2003–04	Jamie Holden	Quinnipiac
2004–05	Ben Conway	Holy Cross
2005–06	Tony Quesada	Holy Cross
2006–07	Louis Menard	RIT
2007–08	Josh Kassel	Army
2008–09	Andrew Volkening	Air Force
2009–10	Jared DeMichiel	RIT
2010–11	Shane Madolora	RIT
2011–12	Chris Noonan	Niagara
2012–13	Matt Grogan	Connecticut
2013–14	Jimmy Sarjeant	Mercyhurst

Year	Winner	School
2014–15	Keegan Asmundson	Canisius
2015–16	Shane Starrett	Air Force
2016–17	Charles Williams	Canisius
2017–18	Billy Christopoulos	Air Force
2018–19	Billy Christopoulos	Air Force
2019–20	Zackarias Skog	American International
2020–21	Trevin Kozlowski	Army
2020–21	Jacob Barczewski	Cansius
2021–22	Jake Kucharski	American International
2022–23	Jarrett Fiske	American International
2023–24	Jason Grande	Holy Cross

=== Winners by school ===
School	Winners
Air Force	4
American International	3
Holy Cross	3
RIT	3
Army	2
Canisius	2
Cansius	1
Connecticut	1
Mercyhurst	1
Niagara	1
Quinnipiac	1

=== Multiple Awards ===
Name	Awards
Billy Christopoulos	2
