= 2020–21 NCAA Division I men's ice hockey season =

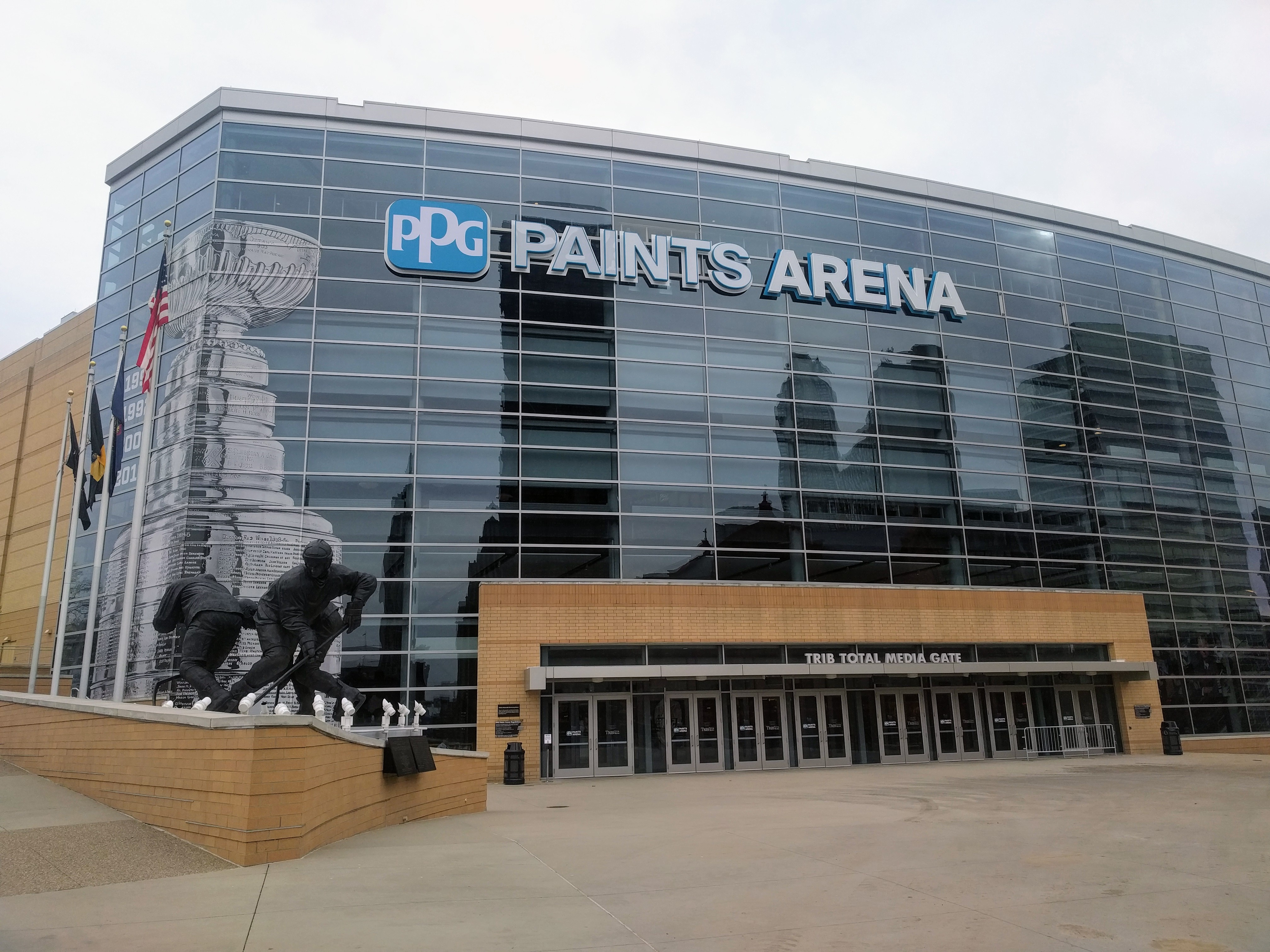
- PPG Paints Arena in Pittsburgh, Pennsylvania was host of the 2021 Frozen Four
- Duration: November 14, 2020– April 10, 2021
- NCAA tournament: 2021
- National championship: PPG Paints Arena; Pittsburgh, Pennsylvania
- NCAA champion: Massachusetts
- Hobey Baker Award: Cole Caufield (Wisconsin)

The 2020–21 NCAA Division I men's ice hockey season began on November 14, 2020, and concluded with the Frozen Four on April 10, 2021. Due to the cancellation of the previous year's tournament due to COVID-19 pandemic, this was the 73rd season in which an NCAA ice hockey championship was held, and was US college hockey's 127th year overall.

Due to concerns related to the pandemic, the start of the season was delayed until what would have normally been the eighth week of play. Despite having to contend with contend with cancellations and delays due to the pandemic, the season was completed. Massachusetts won their first national championship, ending the four-year run of NCHC teams.

== Regular season ==
Due to difficulties in scheduling, Arizona State entered into a scheduling alliance with the Big Ten while LIU did the same with Atlantic Hockey. Both teams remained independent programs and will not be considered for conference championships.

=== Standings ===
2020–21 Atlantic Hockey Standings
| | Conference record | | | | | | | | | | | Overall record | | | | | |
| | GP | W | L | T | OW | OL | SW | PTS | PT% | GF | GA | GP | W | L | T | GF | GA |
|---|---|---|---|---|---|---|---|---|---|---|---|---|---|---|---|---|---|
| #15 American International †* | 12 | 11 | 1 | 0 | 1 | 0 | 0 | 32 | .889 | 47 | 18 | 19 | 15 | 4 | 0 | 67 | 40 |
| Army | 15 | 10 | 4 | 1 | 3 | 1 | 1 | 30 | .667 | 42 | 33 | 22 | 15 | 6 | 1 | 71 | 48 |
| Robert Morris | 15 | 10 | 5 | 0 | 2 | 1 | 0 | 29 | .644 | 58 | 48 | 24 | 15 | 9 | 0 | 85 | 69 |
| Canisius | 13 | 8 | 5 | 0 | 1 | 1 | 0 | 24 | .615 | 42 | 34 | 17 | 11 | 6 | 0 | 59 | 46 |
| RIT | 13 | 7 | 5 | 1 | 0 | 0 | 1 | 23 | .590 | 43 | 40 | 20 | 9 | 9 | 2 | 68 | 70 |
| Sacred Heart | 13 | 6 | 6 | 1 | 1 | 2 | 0 | 20 | .513 | 35 | 38 | 18 | 6 | 10 | 2 | 43 | 59 |
| Mercyhurst | 16 | 7 | 8 | 1 | 1 | 1 | 1 | 23 | .479 | 54 | 50 | 21 | 8 | 12 | 1 | 64 | 67 |
| Bentley | 15 | 4 | 11 | 0 | 1 | 5 | 0 | 16 | .356 | 35 | 48 | 16 | 5 | 11 | 0 | 42 | 51 |
| Niagara | 15 | 3 | 9 | 3 | 0 | 2 | 1 | 15 | .333 | 39 | 53 | 22 | 7 | 12 | 3 | 57 | 70 |
| Air Force | 13 | 3 | 9 | 1 | 2 | 1 | 0 | 9 | .231 | 32 | 49 | 14 | 3 | 10 | 1 | 35 | 56 |
| Holy Cross | 12 | 3 | 9 | 0 | 2 | 0 | 0 | 7 | .194 | 22 | 38 | 16 | 4 | 12 | 0 | 30 | 52 |
Championship: March 20, 2021 † indicates conference regular season champion * indicates conference tournament champion (Riley Trophy); Rankings: USCHO.com Top 20 Poll

2020–21 Big Ten ice hockey Standings
| | Conference record | | | | | | | | | | | Overall record | | | | | |
| | GP | W | L | T | OTW | OTL | 3/SW | PTS | PT% | GF | GA | GP | W | L | T | GF | GA |
|---|---|---|---|---|---|---|---|---|---|---|---|---|---|---|---|---|---|
| #8 Wisconsin † | 24 | 17 | 6 | 1 | 1 | 1 | 0 | 52 | .722 | 92 | 52 | 31 | 20 | 10 | 1 | 118 | 80 |
| #7 Minnesota * | 22 | 16 | 6 | 0 | 0 | 0 | 0 | 48 | .727 | 69 | 44 | 31 | 24 | 7 | 0 | 117 | 64 |
| #9 Michigan | 20 | 11 | 9 | 0 | 1 | 0 | 0 | 32 | .550 | 69 | 45 | 26 | 15 | 10 | 1 | 91 | 51 |
| #17 Notre Dame | 24 | 12 | 10 | 2 | 1 | 2 | 2 | 41 | .542 | 65 | 53 | 29 | 14 | 13 | 2 | 84 | 78 |
| Penn State | 18 | 7 | 11 | 0 | 2 | 1 | 0 | 20 | .389 | 48 | 68 | 22 | 10 | 12 | 0 | 65 | 81 |
| Ohio State | 22 | 6 | 16 | 0 | 0 | 2 | 0 | 20 | .273 | 39 | 82 | 27 | 7 | 19 | 1 | 53 | 101 |
| Michigan State | 22 | 5 | 16 | 1 | 2 | 0 | 0 | 15 | .250 | 32 | 70 | 27 | 7 | 18 | 2 | 40 | 77 |
Championship: March 16, 2021 † indicates conference regular season champion * indicates conference tournament champion Rankings: USCHO.com Top 20 Poll

2020–21 NCAA Division I Independent ice hockey standings
| | Overall record | | | | | |
| | GP | W | L | T | GF | GA |
|---|---|---|---|---|---|---|
| Arizona State | 26 | 7 | 16 | 3 | 68 | 106 |
| Long Island | 13 | 3 | 10 | 0 | 23 | 55 |
Rankings: USCHO.com Top 20 Poll

2020–21 ECAC Hockey Standings
| | Conference record | | | | | | | | | | | Overall record | | | | | |
| | GP | W | L | T | OTW | OTL | 3/SW | PTS | PT% | GF | GA | GP | W | L | T | GF | GA |
|---|---|---|---|---|---|---|---|---|---|---|---|---|---|---|---|---|---|
| #11 Quinnipiac † | 18 | 10 | 4 | 4 | 1 | 1 | 3 | 37 | .685 | 54 | 34 | 29 | 17 | 8 | 4 | 100 | 59 |
| #20 Clarkson | 14 | 6 | 4 | 4 | 1 | 2 | 2 | 25 | .595 | 29 | 25 | 22 | 11 | 7 | 4 | 62 | 52 |
| St. Lawrence * | 14 | 4 | 8 | 2 | 1 | 1 | 1 | 15 | .357 | 30 | 37 | 17 | 6 | 8 | 3 | 40 | 45 |
| Colgate | 18 | 5 | 9 | 4 | 1 | 0 | 1 | 16 | .352 | 34 | 51 | 22 | 6 | 11 | 5 | 48 | 66 |
| Brown | 0 | - | - | - | - | - | - | - | - | - | - | 0 | - | - | - | - | - |
| Cornell | 0 | - | - | - | - | - | - | - | - | - | - | 0 | - | - | - | - | - |
| Dartmouth | 0 | - | - | - | - | - | - | - | - | - | - | 0 | - | - | - | - | - |
| Harvard | 0 | - | - | - | - | - | - | - | - | - | - | 0 | - | - | - | - | - |
| Princeton | 0 | - | - | - | - | - | - | - | - | - | - | 0 | - | - | - | - | - |
| Rensselaer | 0 | - | - | - | - | - | - | - | - | - | - | 0 | - | - | - | - | - |
| Union | 0 | - | - | - | - | - | - | - | - | - | - | 0 | - | - | - | - | - |
| Yale | 0 | - | - | - | - | - | - | - | - | - | - | 0 | - | - | - | - | - |
Championship: March 20, 2021 † indicates conference regular season champion (Cleary Cup) * indicates conference tournament champion (Whitelaw Cup); Rankings: USCHO.com Top 20 Poll

2020–21 Hockey East Standings
| | Conference record | | | | | | | | | | Overall record | | | | | |
| | GP | W | L | T | OTW | OTL | SOW | HEPI | GF | GA | GP | W | L | T | GF | GA |
|---|---|---|---|---|---|---|---|---|---|---|---|---|---|---|---|---|
| #6 Boston College | 21 | 16 | 4 | 1 | 3 | 2 | 0 | 58.61 | 82 | 46 | 24 | 17 | 6 | 1 | 91 | 58 |
| #11 Boston University | 14 | 10 | 3 | 1 | 3 | 1 | 1 | 56.36 | 49 | 37 | 16 | 10 | 5 | 1 | 52 | 45 |
| #1 Massachusetts * | 22 | 13 | 5 | 4 | 1 | 1 | 1 | 55.44 | 76 | 42 | 29 | 20 | 5 | 4 | 103 | 48 |
| Connecticut | 22 | 10 | 10 | 2 | 1 | 4 | 2 | 52.01 | 69 | 63 | 23 | 10 | 11 | 2 | 70 | 69 |
| #16 Providence | 23 | 10 | 8 | 5 | 0 | 0 | 2 | 50.80 | 63 | 61 | 25 | 11 | 9 | 5 | 71 | 67 |
| Northeastern | 20 | 9 | 8 | 3 | 1 | 0 | 3 | 49.94 | 68 | 60 | 21 | 9 | 9 | 3 | 69 | 64 |
| #19 Massachusetts–Lowell | 16 | 7 | 8 | 1 | 1 | 1 | 0 | 48.00 | 46 | 53 | 20 | 10 | 9 | 1 | 59 | 63 |
| Maine | 15 | 3 | 10 | 2 | 0 | 1 | 2 | 46.66 | 41 | 61 | 16 | 3 | 11 | 2 | 43 | 68 |
| Merrimack | 18 | 5 | 11 | 2 | 0 | 1 | 0 | 45.38 | 47 | 66 | 18 | 5 | 11 | 2 | 47 | 66 |
| New Hampshire | 21 | 5 | 13 | 3 | 3 | 2 | 2 | 43.66 | 51 | 83 | 23 | 6 | 14 | 3 | 60 | 88 |
| Vermont | 12 | 1 | 9 | 2 | 0 | 0 | 0 | 38.02 | 17 | 37 | 13 | 1 | 10 | 2 | 20 | 42 |
Championship: March 20, 2021; No Regular Season Champion Awarded * indicates conference tournament champion (Lamoriello Trophy); Rankings: USCHO.com Top 20 Poll

2020–21 National Collegiate Hockey Conference Standings
| | Conference record | | | | | | | | | | | Overall record | | | | | |
| | GP | W | L | T | OTW | OTL | 3/SW | PTS | PT% | GF | GA | GP | W | L | T | GF | GA |
|---|---|---|---|---|---|---|---|---|---|---|---|---|---|---|---|---|---|
| #5 North Dakota †* | 24 | 18 | 5 | 1 | 2 | 1 | 0 | 54 | .750 | 94 | 47 | 29 | 22 | 6 | 1 | 114 | 57 |
| #2 St. Cloud State | 24 | 15 | 9 | 0 | 3 | 3 | 0 | 45 | .625 | 78 | 64 | 31 | 20 | 11 | 0 | 101 | 84 |
| #3 Minnesota Duluth | 24 | 13 | 9 | 2 | 1 | 2 | 1 | 43 | .597 | 72 | 54 | 28 | 15 | 11 | 2 | 84 | 66 |
| #13 Omaha | 24 | 14 | 9 | 1 | 4 | 0 | 1 | 40 | .556 | 79 | 69 | 26 | 14 | 11 | 1 | 85 | 81 |
| Denver | 22 | 9 | 12 | 1 | 0 | 2 | 1 | 31 | .470 | 61 | 60 | 24 | 11 | 13 | 1 | 67 | 66 |
| Western Michigan | 24 | 10 | 11 | 3 | 1 | 0 | 1 | 33 | .458 | 73 | 84 | 25 | 10 | 12 | 3 | 77 | 89 |
| Colorado College | 22 | 4 | 16 | 2 | 0 | 2 | 2 | 18 | .273 | 35 | 77 | 23 | 4 | 17 | 2 | 36 | 79 |
| Miami | 24 | 5 | 17 | 2 | 0 | 1 | 0 | 18 | .250 | 46 | 83 | 25 | 5 | 18 | 2 | 48 | 89 |
Championship: March 16, 2021 † indicates conference regular season champion (Penrose Cup) * indicates conference tournament champion (Frozen Faceoff Championship Trophy); Rankings: USCHO.com Top 20 Poll

2020–21 Western Collegiate Hockey Association Standings
| | Conference record | | | | | | | | | | Overall record | | | | | |
| | GP | W | L | T | OTW | OTL | 3/SW | PTS | GF | GA | GP | W | L | T | GF | GA |
|---|---|---|---|---|---|---|---|---|---|---|---|---|---|---|---|---|
| #4 Minnesota State † | 14 | 13 | 1 | 0 | 1 | 1 | 0 | 39 | 56 | 15 | 27 | 22 | 5 | 1 | 100 | 46 |
| #14 Lake Superior State * | 14 | 9 | 5 | 0 | 2 | 2 | 0 | 27 | 39 | 34 | 29 | 19 | 7 | 3 | 86 | 63 |
| #18 Bowling Green | 14 | 8 | 5 | 1 | 0 | 2 | 0 | 27 | 46 | 34 | 31 | 20 | 10 | 1 | 108 | 67 |
| #10 Bemidji State | 14 | 8 | 5 | 1 | 3 | 2 | 0 | 24 | 42 | 34 | 29 | 16 | 10 | 3 | 82 | 70 |
| Michigan Tech | 14 | 7 | 7 | 0 | 1 | 0 | 0 | 20 | 38 | 35 | 30 | 17 | 12 | 1 | 78 | 63 |
| Northern Michigan | 14 | 6 | 7 | 1 | 2 | 2 | 1 | 20 | 40 | 47 | 29 | 11 | 17 | 1 | 79 | 103 |
| Alabama–Huntsville | 14 | 3 | 11 | 0 | 1 | 0 | 0 | 8 | 18 | 49 | 22 | 3 | 18 | 1 | 31 | 80 |
| Ferris State | 14 | 0 | 13 | 1 | 0 | 1 | 1 | 3 | 28 | 59 | 25 | 1 | 23 | 1 | 55 | 103 |
| Alaska | 0 | - | - | - | - | - | - | - | - | - | 0 | - | - | - | - | - |
| Alaska Anchorage | 0 | - | - | - | - | - | - | - | - | - | 0 | - | - | - | - | - |
Championship: March 20, 2021 † indicates conference regular season champion * indicates conference tournament champion Rankings: USCHO.com Top 20 Poll

== PairWise Rankings ==
The PairWise Rankings (PWR) are a statistical tool designed to approximate the process by which the NCAA selection committee decides which teams get at-large bids to the 16-team NCAA tournament. Although the NCAA selection committee does not use the PWR as presented by USCHO, the PWR has been accurate in predicting which teams will make the tournament field.

For Division I men, all teams are included in comparisons starting in the 2013–14 season (formerly, only teams with a Ratings Percentage Index of .500 or above, or teams under consideration, were included). The PWR method compares each team with every other such team, with the winner of each “comparison” earning one PWR point. After all comparisons are made, the points are totaled up and rankings listed accordingly.

With 61 Division I men's teams, the greatest number of PWR points any team could earn is 60, winning the comparison with every other team. Meanwhile, a team that lost all of its comparisons would have no PWR points.

Teams are then ranked by PWR point total, with ties broken by the teams’ RPI ratings, which starting in 2013-14 is weighted for home and road games and includes a quality wins bonus (QWB) for beating teams in the top 20 of the RPI (it also is weighted for home and road).

When it comes to comparing teams, the PWR uses three criteria which are combined to make a comparison: RPI, record against common opponents and head-to-head competition. Starting in 2013–14, the comparison of record against teams under consideration was dropped because all teams are now under comparison.

Due to the COVID-19 pandemic, most teams played a very small selection of intraconference games, if any at all. As a result, the PairWise rankings would not be used as the primary measuring tool for determining which teams would receive at-large bids for the NCAA tournament. The ranking would only be used to differentiate between teams within their own conferences. The PWR will likely be used as the primary ranking system once a full NCAA season is played.

NCAA Division I Men's Hockey Final PairWise Rankings
| Rank | Team | PWR | RPI | Conference |
|---|---|---|---|---|
| 1 | Minnesota State | 60 | .6037* | WCHA |
| 2 | North Dakota | 59 | .5769 | NCHC |
| 3 | American International | 57 | .5765* | Atlantic Hockey |
| 3 | Minnesota | 57 | .5751 | Big Ten |
| 5 | Boston College | 56 | .5672 | Hockey East |
| 6 | Massachusetts | 55 | .5613* | Hockey East |
| 7 | Lake Superior State | 54 | .5593 | WCHA |
| 8 | Wisconsin | 53 | .5510 | Big Ten |
| 9 | Bowling Green | 52 | .5476 | WCHA |
| 10 | Bemidji State | 51 | .5463 | WCHA |
| 11 | Canisius | 50 | .5430 | Atlantic Hockey |
| 12 | Army | 49 | .5426 | Atlantic Hockey |
| 12 | Quinnipiac | 49 | .5413 | ECAC Hockey |
| 14 | Boston University | 47 | .5391 | Hockey East |
| 15 | St. Cloud State | 46 | .5375 | NCHC |
| 16 | Clarkson | 45 | .5364 | ECAC Hockey |
| 17 | Michigan | 44 | .5311 | Big Ten |
| 18 | Michigan Tech | 43 | .5303 | WCHA |
| 19 | Minnesota Duluth | 42 | .5233 | NCHC |
| 20 | Robert Morris | 41 | .5137 | Atlantic Hockey |
| 21 | Connecticut | 40 | .5136 | Hockey East |
| 22 | Providence | 39 | .5123 | Hockey East |
| 23 | Omaha | 38 | .5100 | NCHC |
| 24 | Massachusetts–Lowell | 37 | .5096 | Hockey East |
| 25 | Notre Dame | 36 | .5092 | Big Ten |
| 26 | Denver | 35 | .5086 | NCHC |
| 27 | RIT | 34 | .5026 | Atlantic Hockey |
| 28 | St. Lawrence | 33 | .4976 | ECAC Hockey |
| 29 | Northeastern | 32 | .4934 | Hockey East |
| 30 | Arizona State | 30 | .4920 | Independent |
| 30 | Northern Michigan | 30 | .4914 | WCHA |
| 32 | Western Michigan | 29 | .4825 | NCHC |
| 33 | Sacred Heart | 28 | .4814 | Atlantic Hockey |
| 34 | Mercyhurst | 27 | .4784 | Atlantic Hockey |
| 35 | Niagara | 26 | .4782 | Atlantic Hockey |
| 35 | Penn State | 26 | .4725 | Big Ten |
| 37 | Colgate | 24 | .4701 | ECAC Hockey |
| 38 | Merrimack | 22 | .4669 | Hockey East |
| 38 | Bentley | 22 | .4669 | Atlantic Hockey |
| 40 | New Hampshire | 21 | .4513 | Hockey East |
| 41 | Maine | 20 | .4559 | Hockey East |
| 42 | Ohio State | 19 | .4495 | Big Ten |
| 43 | Colorado College | 18 | .4435 | NCHC |
| 44 | Michigan State | 17 | .4396 | Big Ten |
| 45 | Miami | 16 | .4375 | NCHC |
| 46 | Long Island | 15 | .4331 | Independent |
| 47 | Air Force | 14 | .4260 | Atlantic Hockey |
| 48 | Holy Cross | 13 | .4198 | Atlantic Hockey |
| 49 | Alabama–Huntsville | 12 | .4139 | WCHA |
| 50 | Vermont | 11 | .4014 | Hockey East |
| 51 | Ferris State | 10 | .4007 | WCHA |
| 52 | Alaska | 0 | .0000 | WCHA |
| 52 | Alaska Anchorage | 0 | .0000 | WCHA |
| 52 | Brown | 0 | .0000 | ECAC Hockey |
| 52 | Cornell | 0 | .0000 | ECAC Hockey |
| 52 | Dartmouth | 0 | .0000 | ECAC Hockey |
| 52 | Harvard | 0 | .0000 | ECAC Hockey |
| 52 | Princeton | 0 | .0000 | ECAC Hockey |
| 52 | Rensselaer | 0 | .0000 | ECAC Hockey |
| 52 | Union | 0 | .0000 | ECAC Hockey |
| 52 | Yale | 0 | .0000 | ECAC Hockey |
*A team's RPI has been adjusted to remove negative effect from defeating a weak opponent Note: A team's record is based only on games against other Division I hockey schools which are eligible for the NCAA tournament Final PairWise Rankings

== Player stats ==
=== Scoring leaders ===
GP = Games played; G = Goals; A = Assists; Pts = Points; PIM = Penalty minutes

| Player | Class | Team | GP | G | A | Pts | PIM |
|---|---|---|---|---|---|---|---|
| Cole Caufield | Sophomore | Wisconsin | 31 | 30 | 22 | 52 | 4 |
| Odeen Tufto | Senior | Quinnipiac | 29 | 8 | 39 | 47 | 22 |
| Linus Weissbach | Senior | Wisconsin | 31 | 12 | 29 | 41 | 2 |
| Jordan Kawaguchi | Senior | North Dakota | 28 | 10 | 26 | 36 | 24 |
| Dylan Holloway | Sophomore | Wisconsin | 23 | 11 | 24 | 35 | 19 |
| Collin Adams | Senior | North Dakota | 29 | 14 | 20 | 34 | 10 |
| Bobby Trivigno | Junior | Massachusetts | 29 | 11 | 23 | 34 | 12 |
| Brandon Kruse | Senior | Bowling Green | 31 | 11 | 23 | 34 | 26 |
| Joseph Nardi | Senior | Northern Michigan | 29 | 12 | 21 | 33 | 0 |
| Shane Pinto | Sophomore | North Dakota | 28 | 15 | 17 | 32 | 4 |
| Alex Steeves | Junior | Notre Dame | 29 | 15 | 17 | 32 | 8 |

=== Leading goaltenders ===
The following goaltenders lead the NCAA in goals against average, minimum 1/3 of team's minutes played.
GP = Games played; Min = Minutes played; W = Wins; L = Losses; T = Ties; GA = Goals against; SO = Shutouts; SV% = Save percentage; GAA = Goals against average

| Player | Class | Team | GP | Min | W | L | T | GA | SO | SV% | GAA |
|---|---|---|---|---|---|---|---|---|---|---|---|
| Filip Lindberg | Junior | Massachusetts | 15 | 918:43 | 10 | 1 | 4 | 19 | 5 | .949 | 1.24 |
| Dryden McKay | Junior | Minnesota State | 26 | 1522:07 | 21 | 4 | 0 | 39 | 10 | .924 | 1.54 |
| Adam Scheel | Junior | North Dakota | 26 | 1590:38 | 20 | 4 | 1 | 46 | 4 | .931 | 1.74 |
| Jack LaFontaine | Senior | Minnesota | 29 | 1705:52 | 22 | 7 | 0 | 51 | 5 | .934 | 1.79 |
| Blake Pietila | Sophomore | Michigan Tech | 24 | 1393:58 | 14 | 9 | 0 | 42 | 3 | .934 | 1.81 |
| Strauss Mann | Junior | Michigan | 21 | 1205:00 | 11 | 9 | 1 | 38 | 5 | .930 | 1.89 |
| Keith Petruzzelli | Senior | Quinnipiac | 29 | 1715:45 | 17 | 8 | 4 | 54 | 5 | .926 | 1.89 |
| Trevin Kozlowski | Senior | Army | 20 | 1253:29 | 14 | 4 | 1 | 40 | 2 | .922 | 1.91 |
| Mareks Mitens | Senior | Lake Superior State | 25 | 1380:55 | 14 | 6 | 3 | 45 | 2 | .930 | 1.96 |
| Matt Murray | Senior | Massachusetts | 14 | 850:57 | 10 | 4 | 0 | 28 | 3 | .917 | 1.97 |

== Tournament bracket ==
Regional semifinals March 26–27
1 | North Dakota (1) | 5
4 | American International | 1
Midwest – Fargo – Fri/Sat
2 | ~~Michigan~~^{†} | –
3 | Minnesota Duluth | –
1 | Wisconsin (4) | 3
4 | Bemidji State | 6
East – Bridgeport – Fri/Sat
2 | Massachusetts | 5
3 | Lake Superior State | 1
1 | Minnesota (3) | 7
4 | Omaha | 2
West – Loveland – Sat/Sun
2 | Minnesota State | 4*
3 | Quinnipiac | 3
1 | Boston College (2) | –
4 | ~~Notre Dame~~^{†} | –
Northeast – Albany – Sat/Sun
2 | St. Cloud State | 6
3 | Boston University | 2

Regional Finals; March 27–28
1 | North Dakota (1) | 2
3 | Minnesota Duluth | 3*****
4 | Bemidji State | 0
2 | Massachusetts | 4
1 | Minnesota (3) | 0
2 | Minnesota State | 4
1 | Boston College (2) | 1
2 | St. Cloud State | 4

Semifinals; April 8
MW3 | Minnesota Duluth | 2
E2 | Massachusetts | 3*
W2 | Minnesota State | 4
NE2 | St. Cloud State | 5

Championship; April 10
E2 | Massachusetts | 5
NE2 | St. Cloud State | 0

* denotes overtime period
† Michigan and Notre Dame were removed from the tournament due to positive COVID-19 test results.

== Awards ==
=== NCAA ===
| Award | | Recipient |
|---|---|---|
| Hobey Baker Award | | Cole Caufield, Wisconsin |
| Spencer Penrose Award | | Mike Hastings, Minnesota State |
| Tim Taylor Award | | Thomas Bordeleau, Michigan |
| Mike Richter Award | | Jack LaFontaine, Minnesota |
| Derek Hines Unsung Hero Award | | Josh Kosack, Union |
| Lowes' Senior CLASS Award | | Jordan Kawaguchi, North Dakota |
| Tournament Most Outstanding Player | | Bobby Trivigno, Massachusetts |
AHCA All-American Teams
| East First Team | Position | West First Team |
| Spencer Knight, Boston College | G | Jack LaFontaine, Minnesota |
| David Farrance, Boston University | D | Ronnie Attard, Western Michigan |
| Brennan Kapcheck, American International | D | Cameron York, Michigan |
| Matthew Boldy, Boston College | F | Cole Caufield, Wisconsin |
| Bobby Trivigno, Massachusetts | F | Shane Pinto, North Dakota |
| Odeen Tufto, Quinnipiac | F | Sampo Ranta, Minnesota |
| East Second Team | Position | West Second Team |
| Trevin Kozlowski, Army | G | Dryden McKay, Minnesota State |
| Drew Helleson, Boston College | D | Matt Kiersted, North Dakota |
| Zac Jones, Massachusetts | D | Jackson LaCombe, Minnesota |
| Colin Bilek, Army | F | Dylan Holloway, Wisconsin |
| Will Calverley, RIT | F | Jordan Kawaguchi, North Dakota |
| Jonny Evans, Connecticut | F | Linus Weissbach, Wisconsin |

=== Big Ten ===
| Award | | Recipient |
|---|---|---|
| Player of the Year | | Cole Caufield, Wisconsin |
| Defensive Player of the Year | | Cameron York, Michigan |
| Goaltender of the Year | | Jack LaFontaine, Minnesota |
| Freshman of the Year | | Thomas Bordeleau, Michigan |
| Scoring Champion | | Cole Caufield, Wisconsin |
| Coach of the Year | | Tony Granato, Wisconsin |
| Tournament Most Outstanding Player | | Jack LaFontaine, Minnesota |
All-Big Ten Teams
| First Team | Position | Second Team |
| Jack LaFontaine, Minnesota | G | Strauss Mann, Michigan |
| Cameron York, Michigan | D | Owen Power, Michigan |
| Jackson LaCombe, Minnesota | D | Spencer Stastney, Notre Dame |
| Sampo Ranta, Minnesota | F | Thomas Bordeleau, Michigan |
| Cole Caufield, Wisconsin | F | Alex Steeves, Notre Dame |
| Dylan Holloway, Wisconsin | F | Linus Weissbach, Wisconsin |
| Freshman Team | Position | |
| Cameron Rowe, Wisconsin | G | |
| Owen Power, Michigan | D | |
| Brock Faber, Minnesota | D | |
| Matty Beniers, Michigan | F | |
| Thomas Bordeleau, Michigan | F | |
| Kent Johnson, Michigan | F | |

=== Atlantic Hockey ===
==== East ====
| Award | | Recipient |
|---|---|---|
| Player of the Year | | Brennan Kapcheck, American International |
| Rookie of the Year | | Lincoln Hatten, Army |
| Best Defensive Forward | | Chris Dodero, American International |
| Best Defenseman | | Brennan Kapcheck, American International |
| Individual Sportsmanship Award | | Justin Cole, American International |
| Regular Season Scoring Trophy | | Jakov Novak, Bentley |
| Regular Season Goaltending Award | | Trevin Kozlowski, Army |
| Coach of the Year | | Brian Riley, Army |
| Tournament MVP | | Justin Cole, American International |
All-Atlantic Hockey Teams
| First Team | Position | Second Team |
| Trevin Kozlowski, Army | G | Stefano Durante, American International |
| Brennan Kapcheck, American International | D | John Zimmerman, Army |
| Thomas Farrell, Army | D | Matt Slick, Holy Cross |
| Colin Bilek, Army | F | Elijah Barriga, American International |
| Tobias Fladeby, American International | F | Chris Dodero, American International |
| Marc Johnstone, Sacred Heart | F | Braeden Tuck, Sacred Heart |
| Rookie Team | Position | |
| Nick Grabko, Bentley | G | |
| Nico Somerville, American International | D | |
| Drew Bavaro, Bentley | D | |
| Lincoln Hatten, Army | F | |
| Aaron Grounds, American International | F | |
| Eric Otto, American International | F | |

==== West ====
| Award | | Recipient |
|---|---|---|
| Player of the Year | | Will Calverley, RIT |
| Player of the Year | | Nick Prkusic, Robert Morris |
| Rookie of the Year | | Randy Hernández, Robert Morris |
| Best Defensive Forward | | Will Calverley, RIT |
| Best Defenseman | | Nick Jenny, Robert Morris |
| Individual Sportsmanship Award | | Nick Jenny, Robert Morris |
| Regular Season Scoring Trophy | | Will Calverley, RIT |
| Regular Season Goaltending Award | | Jacob Barczewski, Cansius |
| Coach of the Year | | Derek Schooley, Robert Morris |
| Tournament MVP | | Justin Cole, American International |
All-Atlantic Hockey Teams
| First Team | Position | Second Team |
| Jacob Barczewski, Cansius | G | Noah West, Robert Morris |
| — | G | Zach LaRocque, Air Force |
| Nick Jenny, Robert Morris | D | Joseph Maziarz, Mercyhurst |
| Dan Willett, RIT | D | Brendan Michaelian, Robert Morris |
| Will Calverley, RIT | F | Randy Hernández, Robert Morris |
| Nick Prkusic, Robert Morris | F | Jon Bendorf, Mercyhurst |
| Keaton Mastrodonato, Cansius | F | Carson Brière, Mercyhurst |
| Rookie Team | Position | |
| Noah West, Robert Morris | G | |
| Brian Kramer, Robert Morris | D | |
| Josef Mysak, Niagara | D | |
| Randy Hernández, Robert Morris | F | |
| Carson Brière, Mercyhurst | F | |
| Austin Heidemann, Mercyhurst | F | |

=== ECAC ===
| Award | | Recipient |
|---|---|---|
| Player of the Year | | Odeen Tufto, Quinnipiac |
| Best Defensive Forward | | Zach Tsekos, Clarkson |
| Best Defensive Defenseman | | Pierson Brandon, Colgate |
| Rookie of the Year | | Ethan Haider, Clarkson |
| Ken Dryden Award | | Keith Petruzelli, Quinnipiac |
| Student-Athlete of the Year | | Kyle Betts, Cornell |
| Tim Taylor Award | | Rand Pecknold, Quinnipiac |
| Most Outstanding Player in Tournament | | David Jankowski, St. Lawrence |
All-ECAC Hockey Teams
| First Team | Position | Rookie Team |
| Keith Petruzelli, Quinnipiac | G | Ethan Haider, Clarkson |
| Zach Metsa, Quinnipiac | D | Pierson Brandon, Colgate |
| Connor McCarthy, Clarkson | D | Luc Salem, St. Lawrence |
| Odeen Tufto, Quinnipiac | F | Ty Smilanic, Quinnipiac |
| Zach Tsekos, Clarkson | F | Alex Young, Colgate |
| Cameron Buhl, St. Lawrence | F | Greg Lapointe, St. Lawrence |
| Josh McKechney, Colgate | F | |

=== Hockey East ===
| Award | | Recipient |
|---|---|---|
| Player of the Year | | Spencer Knight, Boston College |
| Best Defensive Forward | | Marc McLaughlin, Boston College |
| Best Defensive Defenseman | | Drew Helleson, Boston College |
| Rookie of the Year | | Josh Lopina, Massachusetts; Nikita Nesterenko, Boston College |
| Goaltending Champion | | Spencer Knight, Boston College |
| Len Ceglarski Sportmanship Award | | Patrick Grasso, New Hampshire |
| Three Stars Award | | Jonny Evans, Connecticut; Aidan McDonough, Northeastern; Marc McLaughlin, Boston College |
| Scoring Champion | | Jonny Evans, Connecticut |
| Charlie Holt Team Sportsmanship Award | | Massachusetts |
| Bob Kullen Award (Coach of the Year) | | Jerry York, Boston College |
| William Flynn Tournament Most Valuable Player | | Bobby Trivigno, Massachusetts |
Hockey East All-Star Teams
| First Team | Position | Second Team |
| Spencer Knight, Boston College | G | Filip Lindberg, Massachusetts |
| David Farrance, Boston University | D | Jordan Harris, Northeastern |
| Drew Helleson, Boston College | D | Zac Jones, Massachusetts |
| Matthew Boldy, Boston College | F | Jackson Pierson, New Hampshire |
| Jonny Evans, Connecticut | F | Zach Solow, Northeastern |
| Bobby Trivigno, Massachusetts | F | Tyce Thompson, Providence |
| Third Team | Position | Rookie Team |
| Tomáš Vomáčka, Connecticut | G | Drew Commesso, Boston University |
| Marc Del Gaizo, Massachusetts | D | Eamon Powell, Boston College |
| Matthew Kessel, Massachusetts | D | — |
| Angus Crookshank, New Hampshire | F | Gunnarwolfe Fontaine, Northeastern |
| Jáchym Kondelík, Connecticut | F | Alex Jefferies, Merrimack |
| Marc McLaughlin, Boston College | F | Josh Lopina, Massachusetts |
| — | F | Nikita Nesterenko, Boston College |
| — | F | Luke Tuch, Boston University |

=== NCHC ===
| Award | | Recipient |
|---|---|---|
| Player of the Year | | Shane Pinto, North Dakota |
| Rookie of the Year | | Veeti Miettinen, St. Cloud State |
| Goaltender of the Year | | Adam Scheel, North Dakota |
| Forward of the Year | | Shane Pinto, North Dakota |
| Defensive Defenseman of the Year | | Jacob Bernard-Docker, North Dakota |
| Offensive Defenseman of the Year | | Ronnie Attard, Western Michigan |
| Defensive Forward of the Year | | Shane Pinto, North Dakota |
| Scholar-Athlete of the Year | | Kale Bennett, Western Michigan |
| Three Stars Award | | Ludvig Persson, Miami |
| Sportsmanship Award | | Kevin Fitzgerald, St. Cloud State |
| Herb Brooks Coach of the Year | | Brad Berry, North Dakota |
| Frozen Faceoff MVP | | Riese Gaber, North Dakota |
All-NCHC Teams
| First Team | Position | Second Team |
| Adam Scheel, North Dakota | G | Ludvig Persson, Miami |
| Matt Kiersted, North Dakota | D | Nick Perbix, St. Cloud State |
| Ronnie Attard, Western Michigan | D | Jacob Bernard-Docker, North Dakota |
| Shane Pinto, North Dakota | F | Veeti Miettinen, St. Cloud State |
| Jordan Kawaguchi, North Dakota | F | Chayse Primeau, Omaha |
| Nick Swaney, Minnesota Duluth | F | Noah Cates, Minnesota Duluth |
| Honorable Mention | Position | Rookie Team |
| Isaiah Saville, Omaha | G | Ludvig Persson, Miami |
| Brandon Scanlin, Omaha | D | Jake Sanderson, North Dakota |
| Wyatt Kaiser, Minnesota Duluth | D | Wyatt Kaiser, Minnesota Duluth |
| Collin Adams, North Dakota | F | Veeti Miettinen, St. Cloud State |
| Cole Koepke, Minnesota Duluth | F | Carter Savoie, Denver |
| Grant Cruikshank, Colorado College | F | Riese Gaber, North Dakota |
| Ethen Frank, Western Michigan | F | |

=== WCHA ===
| Award | | Recipient |
|---|---|---|
| Player of the Year | | Dryden McKay, Minnesota State |
| Offensive Player of the Year | | Julian Napravnik, Minnesota State |
| Defensive Player of the Year | | Will Cullen, Bowling Green |
| Defensive Player of the Year | | Elias Rosén, Bemidji State |
| Goaltender of the Year | | Dryden McKay, Minnesota State |
| Rookie of the Year | | Akito Hirose, Minnesota State |
| Outstanding Student-Athlete of the Year | | Zach Driscoll, Bemidji State |
| Coach of the Year | | Mike Hastings, Minnesota State |
| Scoring Champion | | André Ghantous, Northern Michigan |
| Most Outstanding Player in Tournament | | Ashton Calder, Lake Superior State |
All-WCHA Hockey Teams
| First Team | Position | Second Team |
| Dryden McKay, Minnesota State | G | Mareks Mitens, Lake Superior State |
| Will Cullen, Bowling Green | D | Colin Swoyer, Michigan Tech |
| Elias Rosén, Bemidji State | D | Will Riedell, Lake Superior State |
| Brandon Kruse, Bowling Green | F | Joseph Nardi, Northern Michigan |
| Julian Napravnik, Minnesota State | F | Nathan Smith, Minnesota State |
| Connor Ford, Bowling Green | F | Ashton Calder, Lake Superior State |
| Third Team | Position | Rookie Team |
| Zach Driscoll, Bemidji State | G | Rico DiMatteo, Northern Michigan |
| Akito Hirose, Minnesota State | D | Akito Hirose, Minnesota State |
| Riese Zmolek, Minnesota State | D | Jake Livingstone, Minnesota State |
| Trenton Bliss, Michigan Tech | F | Arvid Caderoth, Michigan Tech |
| André Ghantous, Northern Michigan | F | Lukas Sillinger, Bemidji State |
| Pete Veillette, Lake Superior State | F | Tyrone Bronte, Alabama–Huntsville |

== 2021 NHL entry draft ==
| Round | Pick | Player | College | Conference | NHL team |
|---|---|---|---|---|---|
| 1 | 1 | Owen Power | Michigan | Big Ten | Buffalo Sabres |
| 1 | 2 | Matty Beniers | Michigan | Big Ten | Seattle Kraken |
| 1 | 4 | Luke Hughes ^{†} | Michigan | Big Ten | New Jersey Devils |
| 1 | 5 | Kent Johnson | Michigan | Big Ten | Columbus Blue Jackets |
| 1 | 10 | Tyler Boucher ^{†} | Boston University | Hockey East | Ottawa Senators |
| 1 | 13 | Matthew Coronato ^{†} | Harvard | ECAC Hockey | Calgary Flames |
| 1 | 18 | Chaz Lucius ^{†} | Minnesota | Big Ten | Winnipeg Jets |
| 1 | 24 | Mackie Samoskevich ^{†} | Michigan | Big Ten | Florida Panthers |
| 1 | 25 | Corson Ceulemans ^{†} | Wisconsin | Big Ten | Columbus Blue Jackets |
| 2 | 36 | Shai Buium ^{†} | Denver | NCHC | Detroit Red Wings |
| 2 | 37 | Josh Doan ^{†} | Arizona State | Independent | Arizona Coyotes |
| 2 | 40 | Scott Morrow ^{†} | Massachusetts | Hockey East | Carolina Hurricanes |
| 2 | 54 | Jack Peart ^{†} | St. Cloud State | NCHC | Minnesota Wild |
| 2 | 57 | Matthew Knies ^{†} | Minnesota | Big Ten | Toronto Maple Leafs |
| 2 | 58 | Tristan Broz ^{†} | Minnesota | Big Ten | Pittsburgh Penguins |
| 2 | 61 | Sean Behrens ^{†} | Denver | NCHC | Colorado Avalanche |
| 3 | 66 | Sasha Pastujov ^{†} | Notre Dame | Big Ten | Anaheim Ducks |
| 3 | 70 | Carter Mazur ^{†} | Denver | NCHC | Detroit Red Wings |
| 3 | 73 | Ayrton Martino ^{†} | Clarkson | ECAC Hockey | Dallas Stars |
| 3 | 79 | Justin Ertel ^{†} | Cornell | ECAC Hockey | Dallas Stars |
| 3 | 80 | Brent Johnson ^{†} | North Dakota | NCHC | Washington Capitals |
| 3 | 88 | Stiven Sardarian ^{†} | New Hampshire | Hockey East | Buffalo Sabres |
| 3 | 91 | Taige Harding ^{†} | Providence | Hockey East | Chicago Blackhawks |
| 3 | 92 | Andrei Buyalsky ^{†} | Vermont | Hockey East | Colorado Avalanche |
| 3 | 94 | Aidan Hreschuk ^{†} | Boston College | Hockey East | Carolina Hurricanes |
| 4 | 98 | Josh Lopina | Massachusetts | Hockey East | Anaheim Ducks |
| 4 | 101 | Guillaume Richard ^{†} | Providence | Hockey East | Washington Capitals |
| 4 | 104 | Brody Lamb ^{†} | Minnesota | Big Ten | New York Rangers |
| 4 | 109 | Jackson Blake ^{†} | North Dakota | NCHC | Carolina Hurricanes |
| 4 | 114 | Red Savage ^{†} | Miami | NCHC | Detroit Red Wings |
| 4 | 115 | Ryan Ufko ^{†} | Massachusetts | Hockey East | Nashville Predators |
| 4 | 119 | Joaquim Lemay ^{†} | Omaha | NCHC | Washington Capitals |
| 4 | 125 | Cameron Berg ^{†} | Omaha | NCHC | New York Islanders |
| 4 | 126 | Dylan Duke ^{†} | Michigan | Big Ten | Tampa Bay Lightning |
| 5 | 137 | Aku Koskenvuo ^{†} | Harvard | ECAC Hockey | Vancouver Canucks |
| 5 | 138 | Jack Bar ^{†} | Harvard | ECAC Hockey | Dallas Stars |
| 5 | 158 | Ty Murchison ^{†} | Arizona State | Independent | Philadelphia Flyers |
| 6 | 162 | Kyle Kukkonen ^{†} | Michigan Tech | CCHA | Anaheim Ducks |
| 6 | 164 | Viktor Hurtig ^{†} | Michigan State | Big Ten | New Jersey Devils |
| 6 | 171 | Cal Thomas ^{†} | Vermont | Hockey East | Arizona Coyotes |
| 6 | 182 | Nate Benoit ^{†} | North Dakota | NCHC | Minnesota Wild |
| 6 | 183 | Chase Clark ^{†} | Quinnipiac | ECAC Hockey | Washington Capitals |
| 6 | 186 | Shane Lachance ^{†} | Boston University | Hockey East | Edmonton Oilers |
| 6 | 192 | Alex Gagne ^{†} | New Hampshire | Hockey East | Tampa Bay Lightning |
| 7 | 195 | Justin Janicke ^{†} | Notre Dame | Big Ten | Seattle Kraken |
| 7 | 204 | Connor Kelley | Minnesota Duluth | NCHC | Chicago Blackhawks |
| 7 | 205 | Arsenii Sergeev ^{†} | Connecticut | Hockey East | Calgary Flames |
| 7 | 206 | Owen McLaughlin ^{†} | Penn State | Big Ten | Philadelphia Flyers |
| 7 | 208 | Hank Kempf ^{†} | Cornell | ECAC Hockey | New York Rangers |
| 7 | 211 | Robert Flinton ^{†} | Dartmouth | ECAC Hockey | Tampa Bay Lightning |
| 7 | 213 | Andre Gasseau ^{†} | Boston College | Hockey East | Boston Bruins |
| 7 | 215 | Daniel Laatsch ^{†} | Wisconsin | Big Ten | Pittsburgh Penguins |
| 7 | 216 | Ty Gallagher ^{†} | Boston University | Hockey East | Boston Bruins |
| 7 | 220 | Taylor Makar ^{†} | Massachusetts | Hockey East | Colorado Avalanche |
| 7 | 223 | Samuel Lipkin ^{†} | Quinnipiac | ECAC Hockey | Arizona Coyotes |

† incoming freshman
Note: players who later became eligible for NCAA participation due to 2024 rule changes are not included.

== See also ==
- 2020–21 NCAA Division II men's ice hockey season
- 2020–21 NCAA Division III men's ice hockey season
