= Marc McLaughlin =

American ice hockey player (born 1999)

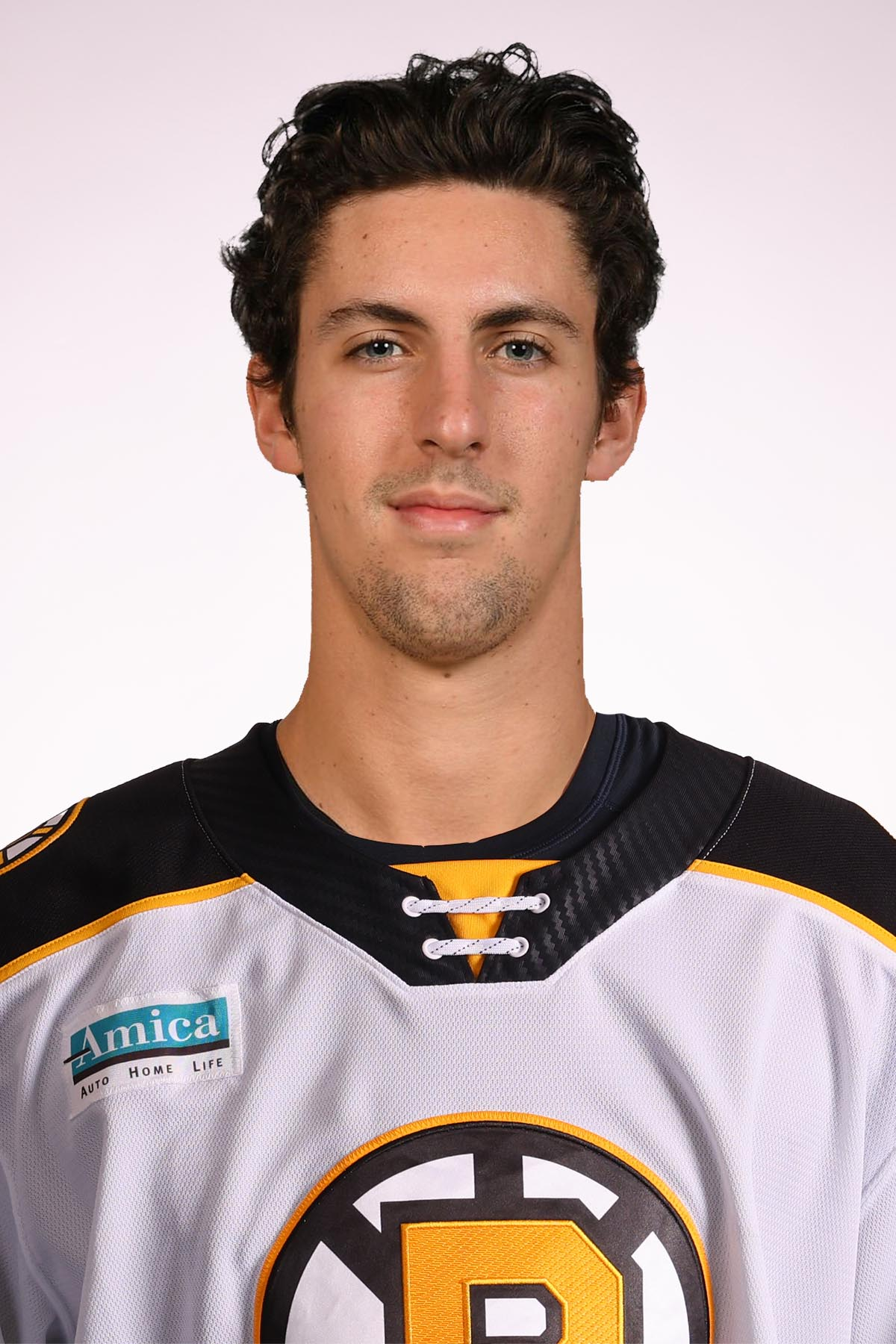
- McLaughlin with the Providence Bruins in 2022
- Born: July 26, 1999 (age 27) North Billerica, Massachusetts, U.S.
- Height: 6 ft 0 in (183 cm)
- Weight: 199 lb (90 kg; 14 st 3 lb)
- Position: Center
- Shoots: Right
- NHL team (P) Cur. team Former teams: New Jersey Devils; Utica Comets (AHL); Boston Bruins
- National team: United States
- NHL draft: Undrafted
- Playing career: 2022–present

Marc McLaughlin (born July 26, 1999) is an American professional ice hockey player who is a center for the Utica Comets of the American Hockey League (AHL) while under contract to the New Jersey Devils of the National Hockey League (NHL). He played college ice hockey with Boston College, where he was captain for his junior and senior seasons. He was a member of United States national team at the 2022 Winter Olympics.

== Playing career ==
=== Collegiate ===
McLaughlin was a fairly unheralded player when he debuted for Boston College in the fall of 2018. As a freshman, he provided minimal offense for an underwhelming squad that finished the year with the program's first losing record in over 20 years. While the team improved the following year greatly, McLaughlin's offense only saw modest improvements. Unfortunately, the Eagles' season ended prematurely due to the COVID-19 pandemic.

Banking on his ability as a defensive forward, McLaughlin was named team captain entering his junior year. While the pandemic delayed the entire college hockey circuit, McLaughlin took charge when he finally hit the ice. He finished second on the team in scoring and helped BC return to the NCAA Tournament. As a senior, McLaughlin continued to lead offensively; however, Boston College had another subpar season and slipped down the Hockey East standings. Regardless of the team's performance, McLaughlin was still held in high regard and was named to the United States national team after the NHL announced that it would not be sending its players to the Winter Olympics, McLaughlin went scoreless in two games while the team finished 5th out of 12 teams.

=== Professional ===
==== Boston Bruins ====
After the conclusion of his senior year, McLaughlin signed a two-year entry-level contract with the Boston Bruins on March 15, 2022. He made his NHL debut for the Bruins on March 31, 2022, scoring his first career goal in an 8–1 victory over the New Jersey Devils.

Heading into his first full professional season, McLaughlin impressed in NHL camp, according to many. However, despite this, he was assigned to the Bruins AHL affiliate, the Providence Bruins. Due to injuries to the NHL squad, McLaughlin was called up on January 23, 2023. He was later reassigned on January 30.

McLaughlin signed a one-year, two-way extension worth $775,000 with the Bruins on July 11, 2023.

To start 2023–24, McLaughlin again started the season with Providence. McLaughlin would be called up to the NHL team on an emergency basis on March 1, 2024. He would mainly serve as a healthy scratch during his brief time with Boston. However, in his lone game with the NHL squad, he would score the only goal in a 5-1 loss against the New York Islanders. He would be reassigned to Providence on March 8.

==== New Jersey Devils ====
On March 7, 2025, McLaughlin was traded to the New Jersey Devils in exchange for Daniil Misyul. McLaughlin would spend most of the remainder of the season with the Devils AHL affiliate, the Utica Comets, scoring six assists in 16 games. He made a short appearance for the Devils at the end of the season, playing two games and managing an assist against his former team, the Boston Bruins.

McLaughlin was sidelined for most of the 2025–26 season with an upper-body injury. He made his season debut with the Comets on February 15, 2026, scoring a goal and two assists in a triumphant return against the Rochester Americans. McLaughlin would score a goal in each of his first three games back from the injury. Again, he would spend most of the remainder of the season in Utica, with a short stint with the Devils at the end of the season, where he went scoreless in seven games. In 23 games with the Comets, he scored six goals and eight assists for 14 points.

On July 2, 2026, McLaughlin re-signed with the Devils on a one-year, two-way contract worth $850,000 USD.

== Career statistics ==
=== Regular season and playoffs ===
			Regular season					Playoffs
Season	Team	League	GP	G	A	Pts	PIM	GP	G	A	Pts	PIM
2016–17	Cedar Rapids RoughRiders	USHL	60	4	12	16	45	—	—	—	—	—
2017–18	Cedar Rapids RoughRiders	USHL	21	10	10	20	33	—	—	—	—	—
2018–19	Boston College	HE	39	4	4	8	20	—	—	—	—	—
2019–20	Boston College	HE	34	5	7	12	14	—	—	—	—	—
2020–21	Boston College	HE	24	10	14	24	6	—	—	—	—	—
2021–22	Boston College	HE	33	21	11	32	22	—	—	—	—	—
2021–22	Boston Bruins	NHL	11	3	0	3	8	—	—	—	—	—
2021–22	Providence Bruins	AHL	1	0	0	0	0	2	0	0	0	0
2022–23	Providence Bruins	AHL	66	13	17	30	45	2	0	0	0	0
2022–23	Boston Bruins	NHL	2	0	0	0	2	—	—	—	—	—
2023–24	Providence Bruins	AHL	68	8	6	14	24	4	1	0	1	0
2023–24	Boston Bruins	NHL	1	1	0	1	0	—	—	—	—	—
2024–25	Providence Bruins	AHL	34	5	9	14	16	—	—	—	—	—
2024–25	Boston Bruins	NHL	12	2	0	2	0	—	—	—	—	—
2024–25	Utica Comets	AHL	16	0	6	6	11	—	—	—	—	—
2024–25	New Jersey Devils	NHL	2	0	1	1	0	—	—	—	—	—
2025–26	Utica Comets	AHL	23	6	8	14	6	—	—	—	—	—
2025–26	New Jersey Devils	NHL	7	0	0	0	0	—	—	—	—	—
NHL totals			35	6	1	7	10	—	—	—	—	—

=== International ===
Year	Team	Event	Result	GP	G	A	Pts	PIM
2022	United States	OG	5th	2	0	0	0	0
Senior totals				2	0	0	0	0

== Awards and honors ==
Award	Year	Ref
All-Hockey East Third Team	2020–21	

Awards and achievements
Preceded by Patrick Curry	Hockey East Best Defensive Forward; 2020–21	Succeeded by Jáchym Kondelík
Preceded by John Leonard	Hockey East Three-Stars Award; 2020–21; With: Jonny Evans and Aidan McDonough	Succeeded by Devon Levi
