= Hockey East Best Defensive Forward =

Annual ice hockey award

- Sport: Ice hockey
- Awarded for: To the best defensive forward in the conference.

History
- First award: 1997
- Most recent: Hudson Schandor (UConn)

The Hockey East Best Defensive Forward is an annual award given out at the conclusion of the Hockey East regular season to the best defensive forward in the conference as voted by the head coaches of each Hockey East team. It was shared for the first time in the 2013–14 season, between Bill Arnold of Boston College and Ross Mauermann of Providence.

The Best Defensive Forward was first bestowed in 1997 and every year thereafter. Justin Hryckowian is the only person to win the award twice (as of 2024).

== Award winners ==
Year	Winner	Position	School	Ref
1996–97	Travis Dillabough	Left Wing	Providence	
1997–98	Chris Drury	Left Wing	Boston University	
1998–99	Doug Nolan	Forward	UMass Lowell	
1999–00	John Sadowski	Forward	New Hampshire	
2000–01	Mike Lephart	Left Wing	Boston College	
2001–02	Mike Pandolfo	Left Wing	Boston University	
2002–03	Mark Mullen	Forward	Boston University	
2003–04	Todd Jackson	Left Wing	Maine	
2004–05	Preston Callander	Forward	New Hampshire	
2005–06	Brad Zancanaro	Left Wing	Boston University	
2006–07	Joe Rooney	Forward	Boston College	
2007–08	Matt Greene	Forward	Boston College	
2008–09	Joe Vitale	Center	Northeastern	
2009–10	Ben Holmstrom	Center	UMass Lowell	
2010–11	Tanner House	Center	Maine	

Year	Winner	Position	School	Ref
2011–12	Chris Connolly	Left Wing	Boston University	
2012–13	Tim Schaller	Left Wing	Providence	
2013–14	Bill Arnold	Center	Boston College	
2013–14	Ross Mauermann	Forward	Providence	
2014–15	Noel Acciari	Center	Providence	
2015–16	Sam Herr	Forward	Notre Dame	
2016–17	Austin Cangelosi	Forward	Boston College	
2017–18	Brian Pinho	Forward	Providence	
2018–19	Chase Pearson	Forward	Maine	
2019–20	Patrick Curry	Forward	Boston University	
2020–21	Marc McLaughlin	Forward	Boston College	
2021–22	Jáchym Kondelík	Forward	Connecticut	
2022–23	Justin Hryckowian	Forward	Northeastern	
2023–24	Justin Hryckowian	Forward	Northeastern	
2024–25	Hudson Schandor	Forward	Connecticut	

=== Winners by school ===
School	Winners
Boston College	6
Boston University	6
Providence	5
Maine	3
Northeastern	3
Connecticut	2
UMass Lowell	2
New Hampshire	2
Notre Dame	1

=== Winners by position ===
Position	Winners
Center	5
Right Wing	0
Left Wing	8
Forward	17

== See also ==
- Hockey East Awards
