= Hockey East Three-Stars Award =

Annual ice hockey award

- Sport: Ice hockey
- Awarded for: To the player who accrues the most stars-of-the-game points through conference play.

History
- First award: 2001
- Most recent: Ryan Leonard (Boston College)

The Hockey East Three-Stars Award is an annual award given out at the conclusion of the Hockey East regular season to the player who has the highest number of points with respect to being named a star-of-the-game. At the conclusion of each game the members of the media decide the three stars of the game, awarding five points for being named as the first star, three points for a second star and one point for a third star. Only conference games are counted in the standings for the Three-Stars Award.

The Three-Stars Award was first bestowed in 2001 and every year thereafter. The overall standings have resulted in a tie six times, the latest instance being the second three-way tie in 2020–21. In 2022–23, Lane Hutson became the first defenceman to win the award in league history.

== Award winners ==
Year	Winner	Position	School	Ref
2000–01	Brian Gionta	Right Wing	Boston College	
2001–02	Colin Hemingway	Right Wing	New Hampshire	
2002–03	Ben Eaves	Center	Boston College	
2002–03	Joe Exter	Goaltender	Merrimack	
2003–04	Keni Gibson	Goaltender	Northeastern	
2004–05	Patrick Eaves	Right Wing	Boston College	
2004–05	Ryan Shannon	Center	Boston College	
2005–06	Chris Collins	Left Wing	Boston College	
2005–06	Cory Schneider	Goaltender	Boston College	
2006–07	John Curry	Goaltender	Boston University	
2007–08	Bryan Ewing	Center	Boston University	
2008–09	Brad Thiessen	Goaltender	Northeastern	
2009–10	Bobby Butler	Right Wing	New Hampshire	
2010–11	Paul Thompson	Right Wing	New Hampshire	
2011–12	Kieran Millan	Goaltender	Boston University	
2012–13	John Henrion	Center	New Hampshire	
2012–13	Martin Ouellette	Goaltender	Maine	

Year	Winner	Position	School	Ref
2013–14	Clay Witt	Goaltender	Northeastern	
2014–15	Jack Eichel	Center	Boston University	
2015–16	Kevin Boyle	Goaltender	UMass Lowell	
2016–17	Anders Bjork	Forward	Notre Dame	
2016–17	Clayton Keller	Forward	Boston University	
2016–17	Tyler Kelleher	Forward	New Hampshire	
2017–18	Adam Gaudette	Forward	Northeastern	
2018–19	Cayden Primeau	Goaltender	Northeastern	
2019–20	John Leonard	Forward	Massachusetts	
2020–21	Jonny Evans	Forward	Connecticut	
2020–21	Aidan McDonough	Forward	Northeastern	
2020–21	Marc McLaughlin	Forward	Boston College	
2021–22	Devon Levi	Goaltender	Northeastern	
2022–23	Lane Hutson	Defenceman	Boston University	
2023–24	Macklin Celebrini	Center	Boston University	
2024–25	Ryan Leonard	Forward	Boston College	

=== Winners by school ===
School	Winners
Boston College	8
Boston University	7
Northeastern	7
New Hampshire	5
Connecticut	1
Maine	1
Massachusetts	1
Merrimack	1
Notre Dame	1
UMass Lowell	1

=== Winners by position ===
Position	Winners
Center	6
Right Wing	5
Left Wing	1
Forward	9
Defenceman	1
Goaltender	11

== See also ==
- Hockey East Awards
