= John Leonard (ice hockey) =

American ice hockey player (born 1998)

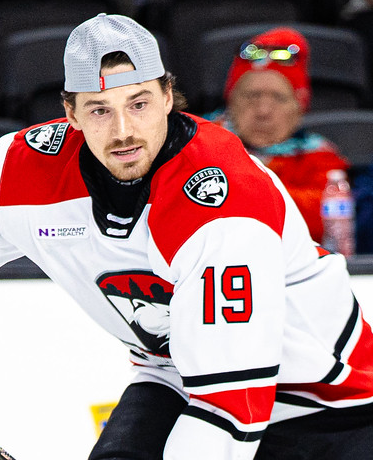
- Leonard in 2025
- Born: August 7, 1998 (age 27) Westwood, New Jersey, U.S.
- Height: 5 ft 11 in (180 cm)
- Weight: 190 lb (86 kg; 13 st 8 lb)
- Position: Forward
- Shoots: Left
- NHL team (P) Cur. team Former teams: Detroit Red Wings; Grand Rapids Griffins (AHL); San Jose Sharks; Nashville Predators; Arizona Coyotes
- NHL draft: 182nd overall, 2018; San Jose Sharks
- Playing career: 2021–present

John Gerard Leonard (born August 7, 1998) is an American professional ice hockey player who is a forward for the Grand Rapids Griffins of the American Hockey League (AHL) while under contract to the Detroit Red Wings of the National Hockey League (NHL). Leonard was drafted in the sixth round, 182nd overall, by the San Jose Sharks in the 2018 NHL entry draft.

== Playing career ==
Leonard was originally first eligible to be drafted in 2016, but was not selected while playing for the Green Bay Gamblers of the United States Hockey League. After two years with the Gamblers, Leonard joined the University of Massachusetts Amherst ("UMass"), playing for their ice hockey team, the UMass Minutemen while studying Communications and Sport Management. While with the Minutemen, Leonard caught the attention of the San Jose Sharks, who drafted him in the sixth round, 182nd overall in the 2018 NHL entry draft despite not having any contact with Leonard during the predraft process. In his third year at UMass, Leonard was a finalist for the Hobey Baker Award and lead all NCAA players in goals, with 27.

On March 31, 2020, Leonard decided to forgo his final year of college eligibility and was signed to a three-year entry-level contract with the Sharks. Leonard made the opening night roster and made his NHL debut against the Arizona Coyotes on January 14, 2021, playing on a line with Evander Kane and Tomáš Hertl. Leonard posted two points in his debut, assisting on goals by both his linemates, helping the Sharks to a 4–3 shootout victory. His first goal came in a 3–2 win over the Anaheim Ducks on February 15, 2021.

After his second full professional season within the Sharks organization, on July 8, 2022, Leonard was traded along with a 2023 third-round pick at the 2022 NHL entry draft to the Nashville Predators in exchange for Luke Kunin. On July 18, 2022, Leonard was signed as a restricted free agent to a one-year, two-way contract with the Predators for the 2022–23 season. He spent the majority of the season with Nashville's American Hockey League (AHL) affiliate, the Milwaukee Admirals, scoring 17 goals and 27 points in 67 games. He got into six games with Nashville and scored his first goal (the game winner) in his first game for the team against Sergei Bobrovsky on March 2, 2023, in a 2–1 win over the Florida Panthers. At the end of the season, again a restricted free agent, he was not given a qualifying offer by Nashville and became an unrestricted free agent.

Leonard signed a one-year, two-way contract with the Arizona Coyotes on July 3, 2023. He attended the Coyotes' 2023 training camp but was placed on waivers. After going unclaimed, he was assigned to Arizona's AHL affiliate, the Tucson Roadrunners to start the 2023–24 season. He was recalled by Arizona on March 12, 2024, after an injury to Barrett Hayton. Leonard made his Coyotes debut on March 14 versus the Detroit Red Wings. He scored his first goal with the Coyotes against Jake Oettinger in his fourth game, a 5–2 loss to the Dallas Stars on March 20.

As a free agent at the conclusion of his contract with the Coyotes, Leonard was unable to garner an NHL deal and was signed to a one-year AHL contract with the Charlotte Checkers, the primary affiliate to the Florida Panthers, on July 2, 2024. In the 2024–25 season with the Checkers he was named to the league's Second All-Star Team after registering 61 points through 72 regular season games.

Following a breakout season offensively, Leonard secured an NHL contract as a free agent, agreeing to a one-year, $775,000 contract with the Detroit Red Wings on July 1, 2025.

== Personal life ==
Leonard was born on August 7, 1998, to parents John and Cindy Leonard. He has three siblings. His brother, Ryan, plays professional ice hockey for the Washington Capitals of the NHL His father, John Sr., was an assistant coach for the UMass Minutemen basketball team between 2001 and 2005.

== Career statistics ==
			Regular season					Playoffs
Season	Team	League	GP	G	A	Pts	PIM	GP	G	A	Pts	PIM
2014–15	Springfield Cathedral High	USHS-Prep	25	47	28	75	—	—	—	—	—	—
2015–16	Green Bay Gamblers	USHL	48	5	4	9	10	4	0	0	0	0
2016–17	Green Bay Gamblers	USHL	58	19	15	34	20	—	—	—	—	—
2017–18	UMass-Amherst	HE	33	13	15	28	10	—	—	—	—	—
2018–19	UMass-Amherst	HE	40	16	22	40	24	—	—	—	—	—
2019–20	UMass-Amherst	HE	33	27	10	37	8	—	—	—	—	—
2020–21	San Jose Sharks	NHL	44	3	10	13	2	—	—	—	—	—
2020–21	San Jose Barracuda	AHL	2	1	1	2	0	—	—	—	—	—
2021–22	San Jose Barracuda	AHL	45	17	15	32	6	—	—	—	—	—
2021–22	San Jose Sharks	NHL	14	1	1	2	0	—	—	—	—	—
2022–23	Milwaukee Admirals	AHL	67	17	27	44	14	6	0	1	1	0
2022–23	Nashville Predators	NHL	6	1	0	1	2	—	—	—	—	—
2023–24	Tucson Roadrunners	AHL	63	12	20	32	24	—	—	—	—	—
2023–24	Arizona Coyotes	NHL	6	1	0	1	0	—	—	—	—	—
2024–25	Charlotte Checkers	AHL	72	36	25	61	22	18	8	6	14	18
2025–26	Grand Rapids Griffins	AHL	47	33	21	54	12	8	1	4	5	2
2025–26	Detroit Red Wings	NHL	11	2	2	4	0	—	—	—	—	—
NHL totals			81	8	13	21	4	—	—	—	—	—

== Awards and honours ==
Award or Honour	Year
College
Second All-Star Team (East)	2019
First All-American Team (East)	2020
First All-Star Team (Hockey East)	2020
Three Stars Award (Hockey East)	2020
Best Forward (New England)	2020
Most Goals	2020
AHL
Second All-Star Team	2025

Awards and achievements
Preceded by Cayden Primeau	Hockey East Three-Stars Award; 2019–20	Succeeded by Jonny Evans / Aidan McDonough / Marc McLaughlin
