= Bobby Trivigno =

American ice hockey player (born 1999)

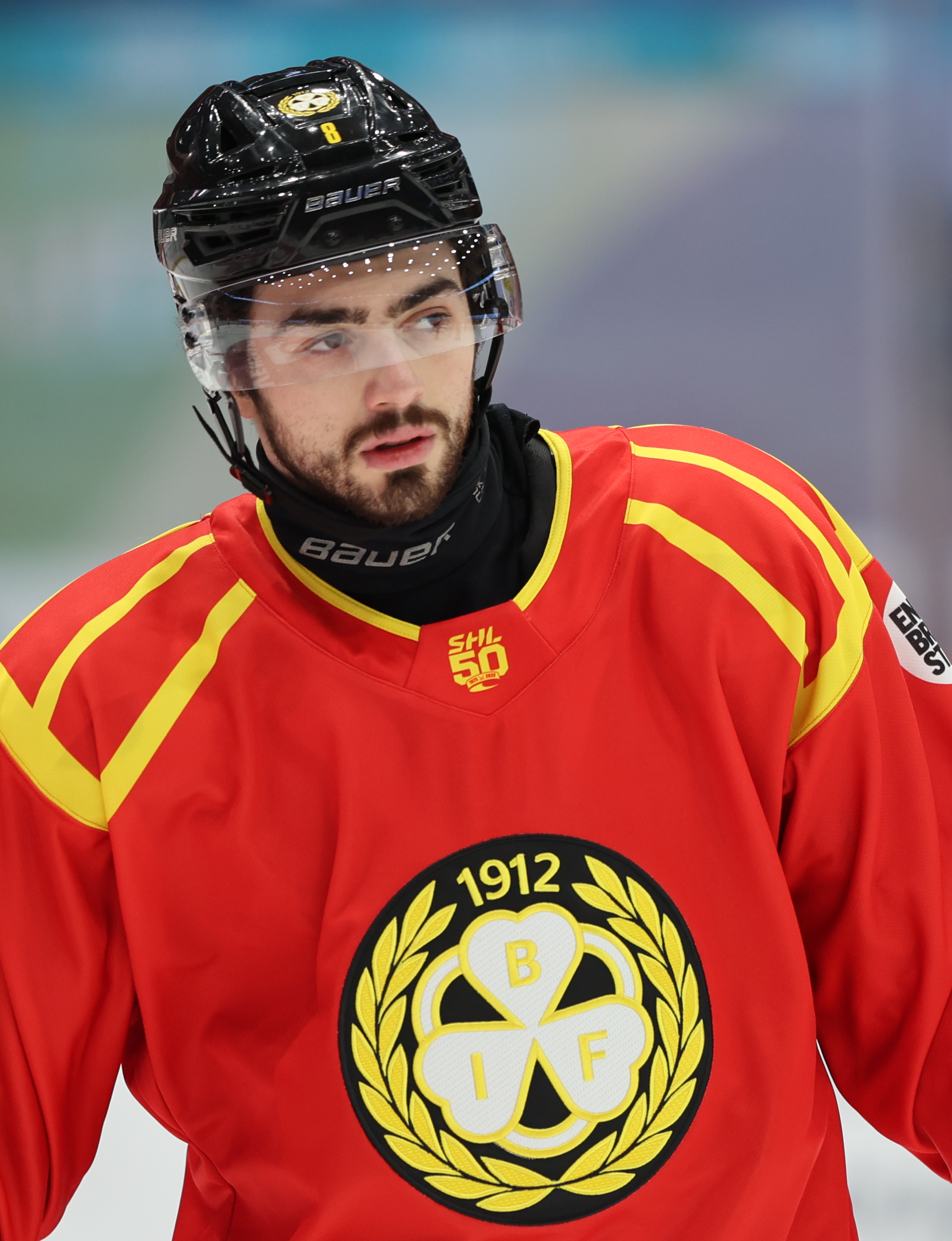
- Born: January 19, 1999 (age 27) Setauket, New York, U.S.
- Height: 5 ft 8 in (173 cm)
- Weight: 161 lb (73 kg; 11 st 7 lb)
- Position: Left wing
- Shoots: Left
- SHL team Former teams: Brynäs IF; Hartford Wolf Pack
- NHL draft: Undrafted
- Playing career: 2022–present

Robert Nicholas Trivigno (born January 19, 1999) is an American professional ice hockey winger for Brynäs IF of the Swedish Hockey League (SHL). He was a collegiate All-American for the UMass Minutemen ice hockey team of the National Collegiate Athletic Association (NCAA) and was the Most Outstanding Player in his school's first national championship in 2021.

== Playing career ==
=== Junior ===
Trivigno was one of the offensive stars for Shattuck-Saint Mary's, a prep school hockey powerhouse, finishing 1st, 3rd and 2nd, respectively in team scoring during his three years with the team. After graduating in 2017, the winger continued his junior career with the Waterloo Black Hawks of the USHL, the top junior league in the U. S. He finished 4th in team scoring, helping Waterloo finish second in the west, reaching the league semifinals. With one year of junior eligibility left, Trivigno signed on with the Massachusetts Minutemen Division 1 NCAA program, joining several of his Waterloo teammates in the elite college ranks.

=== College ===
Trivigno's debut with the Minutemen coincided with the program turning a corner. Head coach Greg Carvel had been rebuilding the team quickly, and saw a dramatic improvement in 2019. While Trivigno was not yet one of the team's star players, he was a major piece of a team that shattered the previous program record with a 31-win season. UMass won the Hockey East regular season title, but was stymied in the conference semifinals. In the Minutemen's second NCAA Tournament appearance ever, the team looked unbeatable in the first two games, winning each 4–0. Trivigno was held scoreless in both match-ups, but got on the scoresheet when he tied the game in the National Semifinal against Denver. Unfortunately, late in the game, Trivigno jumped up and elbowed Jake Durflinger in the head. Somehow no penalty was called on the play, and he finished the game. Following the game, the NCAA reviewed the play and suspended Trivigno for the next game, which would be the 2019 National Championship. Trivigno could only watch as his team failed to score a single goal and finished as the national runner-up.

The following year, UMass was once again one of the top teams in the country. The Minutemen finished second in Hockey East, with Trivigno taking a larger role with the team. He finished 4th in team scoring, and was looking to make up for his mistake the year before. Unfortunately, due to the COVID-19 pandemic, all of the team's postseason games were cancelled, and he would have to wait to make amends.

When the 2020–21 season began, Trivigno took the leading role with the team's offense, and serves as an assistant captain. He led the Minutemen in scoring by a fair margin and easily surpassed his career high despite playing in 10 fewer games. Trivigno led the team to a 3rd place finish in Hockey East but, when the playoffs began, Trivigno was just getting started. In the team's quarterfinal match, he led the way with a three-point night as UMass defeated Northeastern 4–1 and then repeated the performance in the semifinal, scoring the game-winner over Providence. In the conference title game-just the Minutemen's second in 27 years of league play, the team's defense was key to the 1–0 victory, capturing UMass's first-ever Hockey East title, and the first championship of any kind since 1972. Trivigno's six points in the three games earned him the Tournament MVP, as he led the program back to the NCAA Tournament to avenge their flirtation with a championship in 2019.

Compared to recent history, UMass dominated the vast majority of their 2021 NCAA Tournament games. The Minutemen surrendered just one goal in the first two games while outshooting opponents 65–49. When the Minutemen unexpectedly lost four players to COVID-19 protocols before the National Semifinal (including their starting goaltender), Trivigno provided a spark for, keeping UMass in the game. He assisted on both the tying and winning goal, passing the puck to an open Garrett Wait (a former Waterloo teammate) in overtime to lead UMass to the title game.

In the 2021 championship game, the team didn't wait as they had two years earlier. UMass jumped on St. Cloud State as soon as they could. UMass scored all 5 goals of the game, with each coming from a different player. The last came from Trivigno, and soon after UMass celebrated their first Division 1 National Championship. Trivigno was named Tournament MOP and finished tied for 6th in the nation in scoring.

Trivigno was named captain of the defending national champion UMass team for the 2021–22 season.

=== Professional ===
On April 1, 2022, following the completion of his collegiate career, Trivigno signed as an undrafted free agent to a two-year, entry-level contract with the New York Rangers and was assigned to the Hartford Wolf Pack for the end of the 2021-22 season. He scored 1 goal and had 2 assists in 11 games for Hartford. According to Hartford assistant coach Casey Torres, speaking before the 2022-23 season, "The last weekend [of the 2021-22 season], he had a really good weekend stretch, players on the other team wanted to kill him. I think that’s part of his game. He brings such intensity and such fire that it makes people want to hate him, but I think that’s a good attribute. Sounds like he had a really good summer training off the ice, he’s added some muscle. He’s certainly doing everything in his power to give himself a shot." He was expected to compete for a position on the Rangers for the 2022-23 season but the Rangers never gave him a chance. He started the 2022-23 preseason with the Rangers but was assigned to the Hartford Wolf Pack before the season began.

At the conclusion of his contract with the Rangers, Trivigno left the club as a free agent and was signed his first contract abroad in agreeing to a one-year contract with Swedish club, Brynäs IF of the Swedish Hockey League (SHL), on July 25, 2024.

== Personal life ==
Trivigno's sister, Dana Trivigno, is also a professional ice hockey player who most recently played with the Boston Pride of the National Women's Hockey League (NWHL).

== Career statistics ==
			Regular season					Playoffs
Season	Team	League	GP	G	A	Pts	PIM	GP	G	A	Pts	PIM
2014–15	Shattuck-Saint Mary's	US-Prep	51	34	26	60	88	—	—	—	—	—
2015–16	Shattuck-Saint Mary's	US-Prep	51	29	32	61	60	—	—	—	—	—
2016–17	Shattuck-Saint Mary's	US-Prep	56	33	33	66	56	—	—	—	—	—
2017–18	Waterloo Black Hawks	USHL	58	16	27	43	91	8	1	1	2	10
2018–19	UMass-Amherst	HE	39	13	15	28	31	—	—	—	—	—
2019–20	UMass-Amherst	HE	34	9	11	20	20	—	—	—	—	—
2020–21	UMass-Amherst	HE	29	11	23	34	12	—	—	—	—	—
2021–22	UMass-Amherst	HE	37	20	29	49	28	—	—	—	—	—
2021–22	Hartford Wolf Pack	AHL	11	1	2	3	6	—	—	—	—	—
2022–23	Hartford Wolf Pack	AHL	57	7	19	26	20	9	2	1	3	2
2023–24	Hartford Wolf Pack	AHL	49	4	12	16	39	2	0	0	0	2
2024–25	Brynäs IF	SHL	49	17	14	31	22	17	3	2	5	4
2025–26	Brynäs IF	SHL	50	8	17	25	22	5	1	1	2	2
AHL totals			117	12	33	45	65	11	2	1	3	4
SHL totals			99	25	31	56	44	22	4	3	7	6

== Awards and honours ==
Award	Year	Ref
College
All-Hockey East First Team	2021, 2022	
AHCA East First Team All-American	2021, 2022	
Walter Brown Award	2021, 2022	
Hockey East All-Tournament Team	2021	
NCAA All-Tournament Team	2021	
NCAA Tournament MVP	2021	
Hockey East Player of the Year	2022	

Awards and achievements
Preceded by Cayden Primeau	William Flynn Tournament MVP; 2021, 2022	Succeeded by Lane Hutson
Preceded by Parker Mackay	NCAA Tournament Most Outstanding Player; 2021	Succeeded by Michael Benning
Preceded by Jonny Evans	Hockey East Scoring Champion; 2021–22	Succeeded by Lane Hutson
Preceded by Spencer Knight	Hockey East Player of the Year; 2021–22	Succeeded by Devon Levi
