= 2016–17 BCHL season =

2016–17 BCHL Season
- League: British Columbia Hockey League
- Sport: Hockey
- Duration: Regular season 9 Sep. 2016 – 26 Feb. 2017; Playoffs; 3 Mar. – 25 Apr. 2017
- Teams: 17

Fred Page Cup
- Champions: Penticton Vees

BCHL seasons
- 2015–16 BCHL 2017–18 BCHL

The 2016–17 BCHL season was the 55th season of the British Columbia Hockey League (BCHL). The seventeen teams from the Interior, Island and Mainland divisions played 58-game schedules. The 2016 BCHL Showcase, hosted in Chilliwack, was held shortly after the start of the season from September 21 to 25, 2016.

In March, the top teams from each division plays for the Fred Page Cup, the BCHL Championship. The league champion then moved on to compete in the Western Canadian Junior A championship, the Western Canada Cup, in Penticton, British Columbia. If successful against the winners of the Alberta Junior Hockey League, Saskatchewan Junior Hockey League, Manitoba Junior Hockey League and the 2017 Western Canada Cup hosts, the Penticton Vees, the champion and runner-up would then move on to play for the Canadian Junior Hockey League championship, the Royal Bank Cup, in Coburg, Ontario. Since the Vees won the Fred Page Cup, their opponents in the finals, the Chilliwack Chiefs, represented the BCHL in the Western Canada Cup.

== League changes ==
Team map, 2016–17 BCHL season
Island Division
Mainland Division
Interior Division
- The Fred Page Cup playoff format changed to:
  - The top four teams in the mainland and island division, and top five teams in the interior division, qualify for the playoffs
  - The final sixth spot in the interior division can be claimed by whoever finishes higher in the standings between the sixth place interior team and the fifth place mainland team.
  - The top two teams in the interior division receive a first round bye.
  - Each series is a best-of-seven
  - The three team round robin semifinal has been eliminated.

== Standings ==
Note: GP = Games Played, W = Wins, L = Losses, T = Ties, OTL = Overtime Losses, Pts = Points

Mainland Division
Team	Centre	W–L–T-OTL	Points
Wenatchee Wild	Wenatchee, Washington, USA	45-9-0-4	94
Chilliwack Chiefs	Chilliwack, BC	41-11-0-6	88
Langley Rivermen	Langley Township, BC	30-20-2-6	68
Prince George Spruce Kings	Prince George, BC	25-27-2-4	56
Surrey Eagles	White Rock, BC	18-36-0-4	40
Coquitlam Express	Coquitlam, BC	11-44-2-1	25
Island Division
Team	Centre	W–L–T-OTL	Points
Victoria Grizzlies	Victoria, BC	37-12-4-5	83
Powell River Kings	Powell River, BC	37-19-1-1	76
Cowichan Valley Capitals	Duncan, BC	25-28-2-3	55
Nanaimo Clippers	Nanaimo, BC	23-28-1-6	53
Alberni Valley Bulldogs	Port Alberni, BC	16-32-3-7	42
Interior Division
Team	Centre	W–L–T-OTL	Points
Penticton Vees	Penticton, BC	41-13-1-3	86
Vernon Vipers	Vernon, BC	30-19-4-5	69
Trail Smoke Eaters	Trail, BC	26-26-1-5	58
West Kelowna Warriors	West Kelowna, BC	27-29-0-2	56
Merritt Centennials	Merritt, BC	23-25-2-8	56
Salmon Arm Silverbacks	Salmon Arm, BC	24-28-3-3	54

- Standings listed on the official league website.

== 2016–17 BCHL Fred Page Cup playoffs ==
=== Division playoffs ===
Round 1	Round 2
Is1	Victoria	4
Is4	Nanaimo	1
Is1	Victoria	4
Is2	Powell River	3
Is2	Powell River	4
Is3	Cowichan Valley	0
Island/Mainland Divisions
M1	Wenatchee	4
M4	Prince George	2
M1	Wenatchee	0
M2	Chilliwack	4
M2	Chilliwack	4
M3	Langley	2
In1	Penticton	4
In5	Merritt	3
In4	West Kelowna	0
In5	Merritt	4
Interior Division
In2	Vernon	4
In3	Trail	1
In3	Trail	4
In6	Salmon Arm	1

Semifinal
Is1	Victoria	2
M2	Chilliwack	4
In1	Penticton	4
In2	Vernon	3

Final
M2	Chilliwack	3
In1	Penticton	4

Note: If the Mainland #5 seed finishes higher in the regular season standings than the Interior #6 seed, they will face the Interior #3 seed in the first round. Interior teams are re-seeded at the start of the second round.

=== 2017 Western Canada Cup ===
The Chilliwack Chiefs, who lost to Western Canada Cup hosts Penticton in the final, will advance to the 2017 Western Canada Cup in Penticton, British Columbia where they will play for one of two spots in the 2017 Royal Bank Cup.

== Scoring leaders ==
GP = Games Played, G = Goals, A = Assists, P = Points, PIM = Penalties In Minutes

Player	Team	GP	G	A	Pts	PIM
Brendan Harris	Wenatchee Wild	57	23	75	98	14
Jordan Kawaguchi	Chilliwack Chiefs	55	38	47	85	32
Charlie Combs	Wenatchee Wild	58	51	33	84	83
Brett Mennear	Prince George Spruce Kings	58	25	54	79	42
Jonny Evans	Powell River Kings	57	36	42	78	49
Kohen Olischefski	Chilliwack Chiefs	58	24	52	76	47
Tristan Mullin	Powell River Kings	57	36	34	70	45
Cam Donaldson	Powell River Kings	54	32	37	69	16
Quin Foreman	West Kelowna Warriors	58	27	42	69	16
Ryan Barrow	Langley Rivermen	51	28	40	68	32

== Leading goaltenders ==
Note: GP = Games Played, Mins = Minutes Played, W = Wins, L = Losses, T = Ties, OTL = Overtime Losses, GA = Goals Against, SO = Shutouts, Sv% = Save Percentage, GAA = Goals Against Average.

Player	Team	GP	Mins	W	L	T	OTL	GA	SO	Sv%	GAA
Darion Hanson	Vernon Vipers	21	1237	14	4	2	0	38	2	0.945	1.84
Mathew Robson	Penticton Vees	49	2910	35	13	1	0	94	6	0.930	1.94
Anthony Yamnitsky	Wenatchee Wild	41	2148	31	7	0	0	80	5	0.895	2.23
Matthew Galajda	Victoria Grizzlies	40	2263	25	10	2	0	88	3	0.926	2.33
Mark Sinclair	Chilliwack Chiefs	45	2615	33	12	0	0	113	2	0.910	2.59

== Award winners ==
- Brett Hull Trophy (Top Scorer): Brendan Harris, Wenatchee Wild (23 goals, 75 assists, 98 points)
- Best Defenceman: Jake Stevens, Victoria Grizzlies
- Bruce Allison Memorial Trophy (Rookie of the Year): Cam Donaldson, Powell River Kings
- Bob Fenton Trophy (Most Sportsmanlike): Brendan Harris, Wenatchee Wild
- Top Goaltender: Darion Hanson, Vernon Vipers (1.84)
- Wally Forslund Memorial Trophy (Best Goaltending Duo): Mat Robson and Nolan Hildebrand, Penticton Vees (2.14)
- Vern Dye Memorial Trophy (regular-season MVP): Brendan Harris, Wenatchee Wild
- Joe Tennant Memorial Trophy (Coach of the Year): Bliss Littler, Wenatchee Wild
- Ron Boileau Memorial Trophy (Best Regular Season Record): Wenatchee Wild, 94 pts
- Fred Page Cup (League Champions): Penticton Vees

== Players selected in 2017 NHL entry draft ==
Rd5: 148 Kale Howarth - Columbus Blue Jackets (Trail Smoke Eaters)

== See also ==
- 2016 in ice hockey
- 2017 in ice hockey
