= Atlantic Hockey Best Defensive Forward =

Annual American ice hockey award

- Sport: Ice hockey
- Awarded for: The Best Defensive Forward in the Atlantic Hockey Association

History
- First award: 2004
- Final award: 2024
- Most recent: Austin Schwartz

The Atlantic Hockey Best Defensive Forward was an annual award given out at the conclusion of the Atlantic Hockey regular season to the best defensive forward in the conference as voted by the coaches of each Atlantic Hockey team.

== Award winners ==
Year	Winner	Position	School
2003–04	Greg Kealey	Center	Holy Cross
2004–05	Scott Reynolds	Forward	Mercyhurst
2005–06	Blair Bartlett	Forward	Holy Cross
2006–07	Trevor Stewart	Center	Connecticut
2007–08	David Kasch	Center	Canisius
2008–09	Anthony Canzoneri	Forward	Bentley
2009–10	Dave Jarman	Forward	Sacred Heart
2010–11	Rob Linsmayer	Forward	Holy Cross
2011–12	Nick Chiavetta	Forward	Robert Morris
2012–13	Marc Zanette	Right wing	Niagara
2013–14	Dan O'Donoghue	Forward	Mercyhurst

Year	Winner	Position	School
2014–15	Matt Garbowsky	Center	RIT
2015–16	Ben Carey	Forward	Air Force
2016–17	Ryan Schmelzer	Center	Canisius
2017–18	Jack Riley	Forward	Mercyhurst
2018–19	Joshua Lammon	Forward	Mercyhurst
2019–20	Brady Tomlak	Forward	Air Force
2020–21	Chris Dodero	Forward	American International
2020–21	Will Calverley	Right wing	Robert Morris
2021–22	Jake Stella	Forward	American International
2022–23	Cody Laskosky	Forward	RIT
2023–24	Austin Schwartz	Forward	Air Force

=== Winners by school ===
School	Winners
Mercyhurst	4
Air Force	3
Holy Cross	3
American International	2
Canisius	2
RIT	2
Robert Morris	2
Bentley	1
Connecticut	1
Niagara	1
Sacred Heart	1

=== Winners by position ===
Position	Winners
Center	5
Right wing	2
Left wing	0
Forward	14

== See also ==
- Atlantic Hockey Awards
