= Will Calverley =

Canadian ice hockey player

- Calverley with RIT in 2022
- Born: July 17, 1998 (age 28) Scarborough, Ontario, Canada
- Height: 5 ft 9 in (175 cm)
- Weight: 174 lb (79 kg; 12 st 6 lb)
- Position: Center
- Shot: Left
- ECHL team Former teams: Iowa Heartlanders; Florida Everblades
- NHL draft: Undrafted
- Playing career: 2023–2025

William Calverley (born July 17, 1998) is a Canadian former professional ice hockey center who most recently played with the Iowa Heartlanders of the ECHL. He was an All-American for RIT.

== Playing career ==
Calverley's college career began in 2018 after a solid junior career with the Chilliwack Chiefs. He debuted for RIT as a two-way player and provided depth scoring in his first season. He became one of the team's top goal scorers during his sophomore season and helped the team finish third in Atlantic Hockey. Unfortunately, shortly before their quarterfinal series was to begin, the remainder of the season was cancelled due to the COVID-19 pandemic.

Entering his junior season, Calverley was named an alternate captain. He led the Tigers through a tumultuous season with his best offensive output yet, despite playing 14 fewer games than the previous season. Calverley was named an All-American and co-Atlantic Hockey Player of the Year. For his fourth year with RIT, Calverley was named team-captain.

Eligible to extend his college career due to the COVID-19 pandemic, Calverley moved to Merrimack College of the Hockey East for the 2022–23 season. Having completed his collegiate career, placing fifth on the Warriors in scoring with 20 points through 38 games, Calverley embarked on his professional career by signing for the Florida Everblades for the remainder of the ECHL season on April 1, 2023. Calverley ultimately earned a master's degree from Merrimack. Calverley remained on the roster for the Everblades' postseason, contributing three goals and five points in 12 appearances to help Florida capture the Kelly Cup in back-to-back seasons.

In the offseason, Calverley ECHL's rights were traded by the Everblades to the Iowa Heartlanders on August 23, 2023, and he was subsequently signed to a contract for the 2023–24 season. Calverley contemplated retirement after having to be stretchered off the ice following a hit from behind during a game in March 2024. He ultimately returned to playing hockey later that year and had an unsuccessful tryout with the Iowa Wild of the American Hockey League before returning to the Heartlanders.

== Career statistics ==
| | | | Regular season | | | | | Playoffs |
| Season | Team | League | GP | G | A | Pts | PIM | GP | G | A | Pts | PIM |
|---|---|---|---|---|---|---|---|---|---|---|---|---|
| 2014–15 | North York Rangers | OJHL | 1 | 0 | 0 | 0 | 0 | 1 | 0 | 0 | 0 | 0 |
| 2015–16 | North York Rangers | OJHL | 3 | 0 | 2 | 2 | 4 | — | — | — | — | — |
| 2016–17 | Chilliwack Chiefs | BCHL | 56 | 17 | 33 | 50 | 61 | 23 | 3 | 10 | 13 | 18 |
| 2017–18 | Chilliwack Chiefs | BCHL | 55 | 18 | 28 | 46 | 38 | 7 | 2 | 0 | 2 | 6 |
| 2018–19 | R.I.T. | AHA | 37 | 7 | 9 | 16 | 48 | — | — | — | — | — |
| 2019–20 | R.I.T. | AHA | 32 | 13 | 10 | 23 | 20 | — | — | — | — | — |
| 2020–21 | R.I.T. | AHA | 18 | 12 | 13 | 25 | 4 | — | — | — | — | — |
| 2021–22 | R.I.T. | AHA | 38 | 15 | 12 | 27 | 12 | — | — | — | — | — |
| 2022–23 | Merrimack College | HE | 38 | 5 | 15 | 20 | 27 | — | — | — | — | — |
| 2022–23 | Florida Everblades | ECHL | 6 | 1 | 1 | 2 | 2 | 12 | 3 | 2 | 5 | 6 |
| 2023–24 | Iowa Heartlanders | ECHL | 39 | 8 | 13 | 21 | 39 | — | — | — | — | — |
| 2024–25 | Iowa Heartlanders | ECHL | 60 | 16 | 22 | 38 | 64 | 3 | 1 | 0 | 1 | 0 |
| ECHL totals | | | 105 | 25 | 36 | 65 | 87 | 15 | 4 | 2 | 6 | 6 |

== Awards and honors ==
| Award | Year |
|---|---|
| All-Atlantic Hockey East First Team | 2020–21 |
| AHCA East Second Team All-American | 2020–21 |
| All-Atlantic Hockey First Team | 2021–22 |

Awards and achievements
| Preceded by Austin McIlmurray | Atlantic Hockey Regular Season Scoring Trophy; 2020–21; With: Jakov Novak | Succeeded by Colin Bilek / Neil Shea |
| Preceded by Brady Tomlak | Atlantic Hockey Best Defensive Forward; 2020–21; With: Chris Dodero | Succeeded by Jake Stella |
| Preceded by Jason Cotton | Atlantic Hockey Player of the Year; 2020–21; With: Brennan Kapcheck and Nick Prkusic | Succeeded by Chris Theodore |
