= Jonny Evans (ice hockey) =

Canadian ice hockey player

- Born: May 1, 1997 (age 28) Delta, British Columbia, Canada
- Height: 5 ft 9 in (175 cm)
- Weight: 170 lb (77 kg; 12 st 2 lb)
- Position: Forward
- Shoots: Right
- ECHL team: South Carolina Stingrays
- NHL draft: Undrafted
- Playing career: 2022–present

Jonathon Alexander Evans (born May 1, 1997) is a Canadian professional ice hockey player for the South Carolina Stingrays of the ECHL.

== Early life ==
Evans was born on May 1, 1997, in Delta, British Columbia, Canada to parents John and Marni Evans. Growing up in North Delta, he participated in the North Delta Minor Hockey Association before moving to the Delta Hockey Academy.

== Playing career ==
After playing for the Delta Hockey Academy U18 Prep for the 2013–14 season, Evans joined the Powell River Kings in the British Columbia Hockey League and Delta Ice Hawks of the Pacific Junior Hockey League. While playing with the River Kings during the 2016–17 season, Evans recorded 36 goals and 42 assists for 78 points to be named a BCHL Second Team All-Star. As a result of his productive career with the Powell River Kings, Evans earned a hockey scholarship to play with the UConn Huskies men's ice hockey team. UConn hockey coach Mike Cavanaugh has originally been scouting his teammate, Carter Turnbull, but was impressed by Evans' play during the post-season.

=== Collegiate ===
Evans joined the UConn Huskies as a freshman during their 2018–19 season. As a rookie, he tallied 16 points in 22 games to rank ninth among all Hockey East rookies. He scored his first collegiate goal in a 4–2 loss to the Quinnipiac Bobcats men's ice hockey team on October 16. During the season, he played alongside Ruslan Iskhakov before suffering an injury that left him sidelined for one month. Upon returning to the lineup in February, he recorded five goals and five assists. He returned to the Huskies for his sophomore campaign where he increased his scoring output and recorded his first and second collegiate hat-trick. While the season was paused due to the COVID-19 pandemic, Evans continued to work on his strength and conditioning by spending time in the weight room.

Following his first two seasons, Evans had a breakout junior campaign during the shortened 2020–21 season. He appeared in all 23 games and led the Hockey East conference in scoring, with 29 points and a team-best 14 goals and 15 assists. As a result, Evans set numerous program records; he became UConn's first player since 1998 to be named to the CCM/ACHA All-American Team and was also the first Husky in program history to be named a finalist for the Hockey East Player of the Year Award. Likewise, Evans was also named the Hockey East Scoring Champion and shared the PNC Three Stars Award.

=== Professional ===
Following his senior year at UConn, Evans and teammate Carter Turnbull signed amateur tryout contracts with the South Carolina Stingrays of the ECHL. Evans made an immediate impact upon joining the team by tallying one goal and two assists in his professional debut against the Trois-Rivières Lions. Evans finished his 11-game stint with the team with seven goals and six assists. On July 15, 2022, the Stingrays signed him to a one-year contract. Prior to the start of the 2022–23 season, Evans was invited to participate in the Hershey Bears American Hockey League (AHL) training camp. The Bears are the AHL affiliate of the Stingrays and Washington Capitals. Evans spent a week at the AHL training camp before returning to the Stingrays. During the 2022–23 season, Evans and Turnbull remained linemates and began the season by leading the team in scoring. Evans finished the season with nine goals and 21 assists for 30 points through 41 games. He also signed a contract extension to remain with the team through the 2023–24 season.

== Awards and honors ==
Award	Year
All-Hockey East First Team	2020–21
AHCA East Second Team All-American	2020–21

Awards and achievements
Preceded by John Leonard	Hockey East Three-Stars Award; 2020–21; With: Aidan McDonough and Marc McLaughlin	Succeeded by Devon Levi
Preceded by Jack Dugan	Hockey East Scoring Champion; 2020–21	Succeeded by Bobby Trivigno
