= Brennan Kapcheck =

American ice hockey player

- Born: November 17, 1996 (age 29) Mount Prospect, Illinois, USA
- Height: 5 ft 9 in (175 cm)
- Weight: 160 lb (73 kg; 11 st 6 lb)
- Position: Defenseman
- Shoots: Right
- ECHL team Former teams: Tahoe Knight Monsters; Toronto Marlies; HKM Zvolen
- NHL draft: Undrafted
- Playing career: 2021–present

Brennan Kapcheck (born November 17, 1996) is an American professional ice hockey defenseman for the Tahoe Knight Monsters of the ECHL. He was an All-American for American International.

== Playing career ==
=== Junior ===
A diminutive defenseman from the Chicago-area, Kapcheck graduated from Culver Academies in 2015 and continued his playing career. He spent two seasons with the Aston Rebels, helping the team win their division in his first year and then capture the regular season championship in his second. Kapcheck's 42 points were 6th on the team and the Rebels marched all the way to the NAHL finals but were swept 0–3. He was named as the East Division Defenseman of the Year and named to the All-Division and All-League teams.

=== College ===
With his junior eligibility exhausted, Kapcheck transitioned to college hockey. He began attending American International College in 2017, joining a program that had traditionally been a doormat, but the hiring of Eric Lang a year earlier presaged a possible change. Kapcheck got off to a fantastic start to his college career, being named Atlantic Hockey rookie of the month for October and was eventually awarded the league's Rookie of the Year. That season, the Yellow Jackets won 15 games, the most they had earned since 1993 (when they played in Division III) and won their first playoff round in eleven years. Kapcheck was a semifinalist for the Walter Brown Award, given to the best American player in New England and was nominated for the Hobey Baker Award (though he didn't make the final 10).

As a sophomore, Kapcheck's numbers remained flat but both he and the team saw vast improvements overall. AIC won its first ever regular season championship and also captured the Atlantic Hockey Tournament for the first time. He was named first team all-conference for the first of three consecutive seasons and scored the winning goal in American International's first NCAA Tournament game. His junior season saw more of the same as the Yellow Jackets were the class of Atlantic Hockey and ran away with the regular season title. As the team was preparing to begin their postseason run, COVID-19 hit and the end of the college hockey season was cancelled.

The start to the following season was delayed but Kapcheck's team was still a force in Atlantic Hockey. AIC lost just one conference game all season, capturing both the regular and post season championships, but the team was hamstrung by COVID in the second half of the year. Cancellations limited the Yellow Jackets to just 19 games, and American International looked out of sorts in their NCAA Tournament loss. Despite the unfortunate end, Kapcheck was regarded as one of the best defenseman in college hockey, winning the East pod POY and became just the second player in program history to be named as an All-American.

Despite having a year of eligibility remaining, Kapcheck signed a professional contract after the season with the Toronto Marlies.

Following two seasons under contract with the Toronto Marlies, Kapcheck embarked on a European career in signing a one-year contract with HKM Zvolen of the Slovak Extraliga on June 27, 2023.

== Career statistics ==
			Regular season					Playoffs
Season	Team	League	GP	G	A	Pts	PIM	GP	G	A	Pts	PIM
2015–16	Aston Rebels	NAHL	50	3	17	20	82	8	0	4	4	0
2016–17	Aston Rebels	NAHL	55	17	25	42	27	12	1	4	5	4
2017–18	American International	AHA	39	7	19	26	24	—	—	—	—	—
2018–19	American International	AHA	37	5	20	25	12	—	—	—	—	—
2019–20	American International	AHA	33	2	23	25	61	—	—	—	—	—
2020–21	American International	AHA	19	0	18	18	10	—	—	—	—	—
2020–21	Toronto Marlies	AHL	6	0	1	1	0	—	—	—	—	—
2021–22	Newfoundland Growlers	ECHL	23	2	14	16	32	15	0	7	7	13
2021–22	Toronto Marlies	AHL	2	0	1	1	2	—	—	—	—	—
2022–23	Newfoundland Growlers	ECHL	58	5	25	30	59	16	1	6	7	10
2023–24	HKM Zvolen	Slovak	10	0	1	1	12	—	—	—	—	—
2023–24	Newfoundland Growlers	ECHL	34	0	13	13	36	—	—	—	—	—
AHL totals			8	0	2	2	2	—	—	—	—	—

== Awards and honors ==
Award	Year	Ref
NAHL
All-East Division Team	2016–17	
All-NAHL Team	2016–17	
College
Atlantic Hockey All-Rookie Team	2017–18	
All-Atlantic Hockey First Team	2018–19	
All-Atlantic Hockey First Team	2019–20	
All-Atlantic Hockey First Team	2020–21	
AHCA East First Team All-American	2020–21	

Awards and achievements
Preceded by Adam Brubacher	Atlantic Hockey Rookie of the Year; 2017–18	Succeeded by Ludwig Stenlund
Preceded by Mike Lee	Atlantic Hockey Best Defenseman; 2020–21 (with Nick Jenny)	Succeeded by Zak Galambos
Preceded by Jason Cotton	Atlantic Hockey Player of the Year; 2020–21 (with Will Calverley and Nick Prkusic)	Succeeded by Chris Theodore
