= Colin Bilek =

American ice hockey player

- Born: June 4, 1997 (age 29) Brighton, Michigan, USA
- Height: 5 ft 11 in (180 cm)
- Weight: 180 lb (82 kg; 12 st 12 lb)
- Position: Right Wing
- Shoots: Right
- ECHL team Former teams: Kalamazoo Wings; Manitoba Moose; Rockford IceHogs
- NHL draft: Undrafted
- Playing career: 2022–present

Colin Bilek (born June 4, 1997) is an American professional ice hockey right wing who is currently playing with the Kalamazoo Wings in the ECHL. He previously played collegiate hockey with the United States Military Academy. He was an All-American for Army.

== Playing career ==
Bilek began his college career in 2018 with little fanfare. The undrafted forward signed on with the Army Black Knights, a program that typically serves as the last final chapter in a young player's career before moving on to a different professional career. Bilek spent his first two seasons providing moderate offensive numbers. He game showed a small improvement as a sophomore despite having his season cut short due to the COVID-19 pandemic. He was named team captain entering his junior season and Bilek responded with a tremendous offensive outburst. While playing eleven fewer games, he more than doubled his goal production, finishing among the national leaders with 18 markers in just 22 games. The stunning performance earned his a spot on the All-American team and put the Black Knights in a position to earn an NCAA Tournament bid for the first time. Unfortunately, Army fell in the conference semifinals and were ultimately left out of the bracket.

On July 27, 2022, Bilek embarked on his professional career after signing a one-year AHL contract with the Manitoba Moose, the primary affiliate to the Winnipeg Jets. In the 2022–23 season, Bilek was initially assigned to make his professional debut with ECHL club, Trois-Rivières Lions. He was later recalled to the Moose and featured in 2 games for the club before returning to the Lions. Bilek added 14 goals and 23 points in 45 games with Trois-Rivières before he was traded by the Moose to the Rockford IceHogs for future considerations and immediately assigned to continue in the ECHL with the Indy Fuel on February 27, 2023.

== Career statistics ==
| | | | Regular season | | | | | Playoffs |
| Season | Team | League | GP | G | A | Pts | PIM | GP | G | A | Pts | PIM |
|---|---|---|---|---|---|---|---|---|---|---|---|---|
| 2013–14 | Brighton High | USHS | 31 | 8 | 8 | 16 | 4 | — | — | — | — | — |
| 2014–15 | Brighton High | USHS | 25 | 12 | 10 | 22 | 30 | — | — | — | — | — |
| 2015–16 | Rochester Jr. Americans | USPHL | 26 | 9 | 11 | 21 | 20 | 3 | 0 | 0 | 0 | 0 |
| 2016–17 | Northeast Generals | NAHL | 60 | 18 | 22 | 40 | 87 | — | — | — | — | — |
| 2017–18 | Northeast Generals | NAHL | 57 | 18 | 32 | 50 | 56 | 5 | 1 | 1 | 2 | 2 |
| 2018–19 | Army | AHA | 38 | 7 | 10 | 17 | 12 | — | — | — | — | — |
| 2019–20 | Army | AHA | 33 | 7 | 13 | 20 | 33 | — | — | — | — | — |
| 2020–21 | Army | AHA | 22 | 18 | 7 | 25 | 20 | — | — | — | — | — |
| 2021–22 | Army | AHA | 34 | 11 | 20 | 31 | 37 | — | — | — | — | — |
| 2022–23 | Trois-Rivières Lions | ECHL | 45 | 14 | 9 | 23 | 16 | — | — | — | — | — |
| 2022–23 | Manitoba Moose | AHL | 2 | 0 | 0 | 0 | 7 | — | — | — | — | — |
| 2022–23 | Indy Fuel | ECHL | 18 | 7 | 4 | 11 | 11 | 4 | 2 | 1 | 3 | 4 |
| 2022–23 | Rockford IceHogs | AHL | 1 | 0 | 0 | 0 | 0 | — | — | — | — | — |
| 2023–24 | Indy Fuel | ECHL | 51 | 20 | 23 | 43 | 66 | 5 | 0 | 1 | 1 | 4 |
| AHL totals | | | 3 | 0 | 0 | 0 | 7 | — | — | — | — | — |

== Awards and honors ==
| Award | Year |
College
| All-Atlantic Hockey East First Team | 2020–21 |
| AHCA East Second Team All-American | 2020–21 |
| All-Atlantic Hockey First Team | 2021–22 |
| AHCA East Second Team All-American | 2021–22 |

Awards and achievements
| Preceded by Will Calverley / Jakov Novak | Atlantic Hockey Regular Season Scoring Trophy; 2021–22; With: Neil Shea | Succeeded by Incumbent |
