= 2020–21 Mercyhurst Lakers men's ice hockey season =

- Conference: 7th Atlantic Hockey
- Home ice: Mercyhurst Ice Center

Rankings
- USCHO.com: NR
- USA Today/ US Hockey Magazine: NR

Record
- Overall: 8–12–1
- Conference: 7–8–1–1–1–1
- Home: 6–6–1
- Road: 2–6–0
- Neutral: 0–0–0

Coaches and captains
- Head coach: Rick Gotkin
- Assistant coaches: Greg Gardner; Derek Whitmore
- Captain: Quinn Wichers
- Alternate captain: Michael Bevilacqua

The 2020–21 Mercyhurst Lakers men's ice hockey season was the 34th season of play for the program, the 22nd at the Division I level, and the 18th season in the Atlantic Hockey conference. The Lakers represented Mercyhurst University and were coached by Rick Gotkin, in his 33rd season.

The start of the college hockey season was delayed due to the ongoing coronavirus pandemic. As a result, Mercyhurst's first scheduled game was in mid-November as opposed to early October, which was the norm.

== Season ==
As a result of the ongoing COVID-19 pandemic the entire college ice hockey season was delayed. Because the NCAA had previously announced that all winter sports athletes would retain whatever eligibility they possessed through at least the following year, none of Mercyhurst's players would lose a season of play. However, the NCAA also approved a change in its transfer regulations that would allow players to transfer and play immediately rather than having to sit out a season, as the rules previously required.

Mercyhurst managed to recover after the program's worst season, posting a middling record amidst an ever-changing schedule. Despite playing 14 fewer games, the Lakers won three more games than they had the year before. including three over ranked opponents.

Ashton Stockie and Carver Watson sat out the season.

== Departures ==
Player	Position	Nationality	Cause
James Anderson	Forward	United States	Graduation
Stefano Cantali	Goaltender	Canada	Signed professional contract (Chiefs Leuven)
Cory Caruso	Forward	Canada	Left program
Colin DeAugustine	Goaltender	United States	Graduation
Ethan Johnson	Forward	United States	Left program
Jonathan Lazarus	Forward	United States	Graduation
Garrett Metcalf	Goaltender	United States	Transferred to Long Island
Brendan Riley	Forward	United States	Graduation

== Recruiting ==
Player	Position	Nationality	Age	Notes
Carson Brière	Forward	United States	21	Haddonfield, NJ
Wyatt Head	Defenseman	Canada	21	Kelowna, BC
Austin Heidemann	Forward	United States	21	Maple Grove, MN
Hank Johnson	Goaltender	United States	24	Minneapolis, MN; transfer from Bemidji State
Noah Kane	Forward	United States	20	Buffalo, NY
Matt Lenz	Goaltender	Canada	21	Calgary, AB
Jac Lymn	Goaltender	United States	19	Charlotte, NC
Kyle McClellan	Goaltender	United States	21	Manchester, MO
Devon Mussio	Defenseman	Canada	21	Vancouver, BC
Marko Reifenberger	Forward	United States	21	Hastings, MN
Dante Sheriff	Forward	Canada	21	Woodbridge, ON
Rylee St. Onge	Forward	Canada	22	St. Catharines, ON; transfer from Alaska Anchorage
Keanan Stewart	Defenseman	Canada	20	Guelph, ON

== Roster ==
As of December 31, 2020

No.	Nat.	Player	Class	Pos	Height	Weight	DoB	Hometown	Previous team	NHL rights
1	(United States)	Matt Lenz	Freshman	G	5' 11" (1.8 m)	170 lb (77 kg)	1999-06-02	Grapevine, Texas	Steinbach Pistons (MJHL)	—
2	(Canada)	Cade Townend	Sophomore	D	6' 1" (1.85 m)	200 lb (91 kg)	1999-06-17	Carleton Place, Ontario	Carleton Place Canadians (CCHL)	—
4	(Canada)	Quinn Wichers (C)	Senior	D	6' 4" (1.93 m)	217 lb (98 kg)	1997-08-19	Metcalfe, Ontario	Kemptville 73's (CCHL)	—
5	(United States)	Michael Bevilacqua (A)	Junior	D	6' 1" (1.85 m)	210 lb (95 kg)	1997-05-07	Hamburg, New York	Green Bay Gamblers (USHL)	—
6	(United States)	Carson Brière	Freshman	F	5' 9" (1.75 m)	165 lb (75 kg)	1999-09-23	Philadelphia, Pennsylvania	Trail Smoke Eaters (BCHL)	—
7	(Canada)	Devon Daniels	Junior	D	6' 1" (1.85 m)	185 lb (84 kg)	1998-04-28	Thunder Bay, Ontario	Ottawa Jr. Senators (CCHL)	—
8	(Canada)	Owen Norton	Junior	D	5' 9" (1.75 m)	161 lb (73 kg)	1998-06-19	Ancaster, Ontario	Surrey Eagles (BCHL)	—
9	(United States)	Justin Cmunt	Sophomore	F	5' 10" (1.78 m)	180 lb (82 kg)	1998-01-28	East Amherst, New York	Shreveport Mudbugs (NAHL)	—
10	(Canada)	Geoff Kitt	Junior	F	6' 3" (1.91 m)	195 lb (88 kg)	1997-02-09	Dryden, Ontario	Carleton Place Canadians (CCHL)	—
11	(United States)	Steven Ipri	Junior	F	5' 11" (1.8 m)	155 lb (70 kg)	1998-03-13	Broadview Heights, Ohio	Lone Star Brahmas (NAHL)	—
12	(United States)	Austin Heidemann	Freshman	F	6' 0" (1.83 m)	190 lb (86 kg)	1999-06-27	Maple Grove, Minnesota	Sioux City Musketeers (USHL)	—
13	(United States)	Paul Maust	Sophomore	F	5' 10" (1.78 m)	170 lb (77 kg)	1998-06-24	Butler, Pennsylvania	Green Bay Gamblers (USHL)	—
14	(United States)	Gueorgui Feduolov	Sophomore	F	5' 9" (1.75 m)	195 lb (88 kg)	1998-12-10	Mentor, Ohio	Shreveport Mudbugs (NAHL)	—
15	(Canada)	Dante Spagnuolo	Sophomore	F	5' 11" (1.8 m)	178 lb (81 kg)	1998-09-04	Newmarket, Ontario	North York Rangers (OJHL)	—
16	(Canada)	Wyatt Head	Freshman	D	6' 1" (1.85 m)	180 lb (82 kg)	1999-03-28	Kelowna, British Columbia	Coquitlam Express (BCHL)	—
16	(Canada)	Ashton Stockie	Sophomore	F	6' 1" (1.85 m)	190 lb (86 kg)	1999-07-15	Stratford, Ontario	North York Rangers (OJHL)	—
18	(United States)	Dalton Hunter	Junior	F	6' 3" (1.91 m)	210 lb (95 kg)	1997-09-26	Greensburg, Pennsylvania	Dubuque Fighting Saints (USHL)	—
19	(United States)	Garrett Dahm	Freshman	F	6' 1" (1.85 m)	175 lb (79 kg)	2000-06-29	Belleville, Illinois	Youngstown Phantoms (USHL)	—
20	(Canada)	Keanan Stewart	Freshman	F	6' 3" (1.91 m)	195 lb (88 kg)	2000-04-29	Elmira, Ontario	Burlington Cougars (OJHL)	—
21	(United States)	Khristian Acosta	Sophomore	F	5' 8" (1.73 m)	170 lb (77 kg)	1998-05-05	Port Monmouth, New Jersey	Tri-City Storm (USHL)	—
22	(Canada)	Brendan Schneider	Sophomore	F	5' 9" (1.75 m)	175 lb (79 kg)	1998-08-26	Wellesley, Ontario	Merritt Centennials (BCHL)	—
23	(United States)	Jonathan Bendorf	Sophomore	F	6' 0" (1.83 m)	180 lb (82 kg)	1999-02-26	Yardville, New Jersey	Aberdeen Wings (NAHL)	—
24	(United States)	Marko Reifenberger	Freshman	F	6' 0" (1.83 m)	190 lb (86 kg)	1999-01-19	Hastings, Minnesota	Minnesota Magicians (NAHL)	—
25	(Canada)	Joseph Maziarz	Sophomore	D	5' 11" (1.8 m)	190 lb (86 kg)	1999-02-23	Waterloo, Ontario	North York Rangers (OJHL)	—
27	(United States)	Carver Watson	Sophomore	D	5' 11" (1.8 m)	175 lb (79 kg)	1998-03-03	Appleton, Wisconsin	Vernon Vipers (BCHL)	—
28	(Canada)	Josh McDougall	Junior	D	5' 10" (1.78 m)	187 lb (85 kg)	1998-06-19	Prince Albert, Saskatchewan	Nipawin Hawks (SJHL)	—
29	(United States)	Hank Johnson	Senior	G	6' 1" (1.85 m)	175 lb (79 kg)	1996-01-10	Minneapolis, Minnesota	Bemidji State (WCHA)	—
31	(United States)	Kyle McClellan	Freshman	G	6' 1" (1.85 m)	185 lb (84 kg)	1999-03-18	Manchester, Missouri	Omaha Lancers (USHL)	—
34	(United States)	Noah Kane	Freshman	F	5' 11" (1.8 m)	180 lb (82 kg)	1999-11-27	Buffalo, New York	Maine Nordiques (NAHL)	—
37	(Canada)	Rylee St. Onge	Sophomore	F	5' 10" (1.78 m)	195 lb (88 kg)	1998-04-22	St. Catharines, Ontario	Alaska Anchorage (WCHA)	—
38	(Canada)	Dante Sheriff	Freshman	F	5' 11" (1.8 m)	180 lb (82 kg)	1999-08-04	Brampton, Ontario	Austin Bruins (NAHL)	—

== Standings ==
2020–21 Atlantic Hockey Standings
	Conference record											Overall record					
	GP	W	L	T	OW	OL	SW	PTS	PT%	GF	GA	GP	W	L	T	GF	GA
#15 American International †*	12	11	1	0	1	0	0	32	.889	47	18	19	15	4	0	67	40
Army	15	10	4	1	3	1	1	30	.667	42	33	22	15	6	1	71	48
Robert Morris	15	10	5	0	2	1	0	29	.644	58	48	24	15	9	0	85	69
Canisius	13	8	5	0	1	1	0	24	.615	42	34	17	11	6	0	59	46
RIT	13	7	5	1	0	0	1	23	.590	43	40	20	9	9	2	68	70
Sacred Heart	13	6	6	1	1	2	0	20	.513	35	38	18	6	10	2	43	59
Mercyhurst	16	7	8	1	1	1	1	23	.479	54	50	21	8	12	1	64	67
Bentley	15	4	11	0	1	5	0	16	.356	35	48	16	5	11	0	42	51
Niagara	15	3	9	3	0	2	1	15	.333	39	53	22	7	12	3	57	70
Air Force	13	3	9	1	2	1	0	9	.231	32	49	14	3	10	1	35	56
Holy Cross	12	3	9	0	2	0	0	7	.194	22	38	16	4	12	0	30	52
Championship: March 20, 2021 † indicates conference regular season champion * indicates conference tournament champion (Riley Trophy); Rankings: USCHO.com Top 20 Poll

== Schedule and results ==
Date	Time	Opponent^{#}	Rank^{#}	Site	TV	Decision	Result	Attendance	Record
Regular season
December 5	1:30 p.m.	at #18 Bowling Green*		Slater Family Ice Arena • Bowling Green, Ohio		Johnson	W 2–1	300	1–0–0
December 6	3:00 p.m.	vs. #18 Bowling Green*		Mercyhurst Ice Center • Erie, Pennsylvania		Johnson	L 1–3	149	1–1–0
December 12	5:00 p.m.	vs. #7 Clarkson*		Mercyhurst Ice Center • Erie, Pennsylvania		Johnson	L 3–4 ^{OT}	89	1–2–0
December 13	4:00 p.m.	vs. #7 Clarkson*		Mercyhurst Ice Center • Erie, Pennsylvania		Johnson	L 2–6	89	1–3–0
December 16	5:05 p.m.	vs. Niagara		Mercyhurst Ice Center • Erie, Pennsylvania		Johnson	T 3–3 ^{SOW}	97	1–3–1 (0–0–1)
December 18	7:00 p.m.	at Niagara		Dwyer Arena • Lewiston, New York		Johnson	W 7–4	0	2–3–1 (1–0–1)
January 2	4:35 p.m.	at Canisius		LECOM Harborcenter • Buffalo, New York		Johnson	L 2–3	0	2–4–1 (1–1–1)
January 3	3:00 p.m.	vs. Canisius		Mercyhurst Ice Center • Erie, Pennsylvania		Johnson	L 0–3	127	2–5–1 (1–2–1)
January 8	5:00 p.m.	vs. Air Force		Mercyhurst Ice Center • Erie, Pennsylvania		Johnson	W 5–2	127	3–5–1 (2–2–1)
January 9	3:00 p.m.	vs. Air Force		Mercyhurst Ice Center • Erie, Pennsylvania		McClellan	W 6–3	137	4–5–1 (3–2–1)
January 19	4:30 p.m.	vs. #17 Robert Morris		Mercyhurst Ice Center • Erie, Pennsylvania		Johnson	W 3–2 ^{OT}	127	5–5–1 (4–2–1)
January 23	4:35 p.m.	vs. #17 Robert Morris		Mercyhurst Ice Center • Erie, Pennsylvania		Johnson	W 7–5	75	6–5–1 (5–2–1)
January 28	5:00 p.m.	at RIT		Gene Polisseni Center • Henrietta, New York		Johnson	L 4–6	0	6–6–1 (5–3–1)
January 30	7:30 p.m.	vs. Robert Morris		Colonials Arena • Neville Township, Pennsylvania		Johnson	L 3–5	0	6–7–1 (5–4–1)
February 5	5:00 p.m.	at RIT		Gene Polisseni Center • Henrietta, New York		McClellan	L 1–2	0	6–8–1 (5–5–1)
February 6	5:05 p.m.	vs. RIT		Mercyhurst Ice Center • Erie, Pennsylvania		Johnson	W 6–2	0	7–8–1 (6–5–1)
February 9	7:05 p.m.	vs. Canisius		Mercyhurst Ice Center • Erie, Pennsylvania		McClellan	L 1–3	0	7–9–1 (6–6–1)
February 16	7:05 p.m.	at Canisius		LECOM Harborcenter • Buffalo, New York		McClellan	L 4–5 ^{OT}	0	7–10–1 (6–7–1)
February 19	7:05 p.m.	vs. Niagara		Mercyhurst Ice Center • Erie, Pennsylvania		McClellan	W 1–0	0	8–10–1 (7–7–1)
February 20	7:00 p.m.	vs. Niagara		Dwyer Arena • Lewiston, New York		McClellan	L 1–2	0	8–11–1 (7–8–1)
Atlantic Hockey Tournament
March 8	5:00 p.m.	vs. Niagara*		Mercyhurst Ice Center • Erie, Pennsylvania (First round)		McClellan	L 2–3	163	8–12–1
*Non-conference game. ^{#}Rankings from USCHO.com Poll. All times are in Eastern Time.

== Scoring statistics ==
Name	Position	Games	Goals	Assists	Points	PIM
Carson Brière	C/RW	21	5	14	19	10
Jonathan Bendorf	LW	21	11	4	15	2
Dante Sheriff	F	19	5	10	15	31
Gueorgui Feduolov	F	21	4	9	13	16
Joseph Maziarz	D	20	1	12	13	8
Austin Heidemann	F	16	7	5	12	9
Geoff Kitt	C	19	3	6	9	4
Owen Norton	D	19	0	9	9	8
Michael Bevilacqua	D	21	5	3	8	8
Paul Maust	LW	21	3	5	8	28
Josh McDougall	D/F	17	1	7	8	0
Steven Ipri	F	11	4	2	6	12
Noah Kane	C	19	4	2	6	6
Marko Reifenberger	C	21	1	5	6	4
Cade Townend	D	21	2	3	5	14
Brendan Schneider	C	9	2	2	4	5
Rylee St. Onge	LW	9	1	3	4	0
Devon Daniels	D	18	1	3	4	0
Justin Cmunt	LW	11	2	1	3	8
Dante Spagnuolo	C	13	1	2	3	10
Keanan Stewart	F	13	1	2	3	17
Dalton Hunter	RW	8	0	3	3	2
Quinn Wichers	D	17	0	3	3	4
Khristian Acosta	F	7	0	1	1	4
Hank Johnson	G	15	0	1	1	0
Wyatt Head	D	2	0	0	0	0
Devon Mussio	D	3	0	0	0	0
Kyle McClellan	G	6	0	0	0	0
Total			64	117	181	214

== Goaltending statistics ==
Name	Games	Minutes	Wins	Losses	Ties	Goals against	Saves	Shut Outs	SV %	GAA
Kyle McClellan	6	355	2	4	0	12	164	1	.932	2.03
Hank Johnson	15	904	6	8	1	52	469	0	.900	3.45
Empty Net	-	13	-	-	-	3	-	-	-	-
Total	21	1273	8	12	1	67	633	1	.904	3.16

== Rankings ==
Poll	Week																					
Poll	Pre	1	2	3	4	5	6	7	8	9	10	11	12	13	14	15	16	17	18	19	20	21 (Final)
USCHO.com	NR	NR	NR	NR	NR	NR	NR	NR	NR	NR	NR	NR	NR	NR	NR	NR	NR	NR	NR	NR	-	NR
USA Today	NR	NR	NR	NR	NR	NR	NR	NR	NR	NR	NR	NR	NR	NR	NR	NR	NR	NR	NR	NR	NR	NR

USCHO did not release a poll in week 20.

== Awards and honors ==
Player	Award	Ref
Joseph Maziarz	Atlantic Hockey Second Team	
Jon Bendorf	Atlantic Hockey Second Team	
Carson Brière	Atlantic Hockey Second Team	
Carson Brière	Atlantic Hockey Rookie Team	
Austin Heidemann	Atlantic Hockey Rookie Team	
