= 2020–21 Niagara Purple Eagles men's ice hockey season =

- Conference: 9th Atlantic Hockey
- Home ice: Dwyer Arena

Rankings
- USCHO.com: NR
- USA Today/ US Hockey Magazine: NR

Record
- Overall: 7–12–3
- Conference: 3–9–3–0–2–1
- Home: 3–6–1
- Road: 4–6–2
- Neutral: 0–0–0

Coaches and captains
- Head coach: Jason Lammers
- Assistant coaches: Ian Burt; John Lidgett; Mark Phalon
- Captain: Chris Harpur

The 2020–21 Niagara Purple Eagles men's ice hockey season was the 25th season of play for the program, the 23rd at the Division I level, and the 11th season in the Atlantic Hockey conference. The Purple Eagles represented Niagara University and were coached by Jason Lammers, in his 4th season.

== Season ==
As a result of the ongoing COVID-19 pandemic the entire college ice hockey season was delayed. Because the NCAA had previously announced that all winter sports athletes would retain whatever eligibility they possessed through at least the following year, none of Niagara's players would lose a season of play. However, the NCAA also approved a change in its transfer regulations that would allow players to transfer and play immediately rather than having to sit out a season, as the rules previously required.

Niagara had a difficult start to their season, with the team's defense unable to withstand sustained pressure for most of their games. By mid-January the team was near the bottom of the conference with just 2 wins in 13 games. To make matters worse, the Purple Eagles weren't able to play any games for 6 weeks due to COVID cancellations. When they finally managed to play again they decided to use Chad Veltri as their starting goaltender. In the final two weekends of the regular season the choice appeared to work out as Niagara split both weekends while Veltri recorded the only shutout for the Purple Eagles on the campaign.

Niagara entered the postseason as the 9th seed and needed to beat Mercyhurst to keep their season alive. After the Lakers scored the first two goals of the game it looked like NU would have an early summer but Veltri withstood a barrage of shots from Mercyhurst over the final 38 minutes and allowed Niagara to crawl its way back and win on a late marker from junior transfer Walker Sommer. In the quarterfinals, the Purple Eagles had to face Robert Morris, a team that had won all four meetings to that point. The Colonials won the first game but they needed overtime to do so. In keeping the game close, Veltri game his team an opportunity to win and the sophomore netminder remained hot in game 2 as well; Veltri faced 51 shots over an 80-minute span and the frantic pace appeared to wear on Robert Morris who weren't able to get a single shot on goal in over 7 minutes of play in the second overtime. Instead, it was Niagara who fired 5 shots on goal with the last tying the series at 1-all. Veltri was again front and center for the team in the deciding game, facing 45 shots in regulation. Niagara built a 2-goal lead and held it until just 12 seconds remained in the game, when RMU scored their only goal on the night, allowing Niagara to pull off a huge upset in the conference tournament.

In the semifinals, Niagara had to get past league-leading American International, who had not played a game since the end of January due to their own series of cancellations. Veltri continued to keep the Purple Eagles in contention, stopping everything in the first two periods and giving the team a lead entering the third, but AIC's slumbering offense awoke in the final frame, scored two goals, and ended Niagara's improbable run.

Trevor Poeze and Patrick Pugliese sat out the season.

== Departures ==
Player	Position	Nationality	Cause
Ryan Cook	Defenseman	United States	Graduation (Signed with Huntsville Havoc)
Noah Delmas	Defenseman	Canada	Graduation (Signed with Kansas City Mavericks)
Tyler Hayes	Defenseman	United States	Graduation
Stephen Kleysen	Defenseman	Canada	Left program
Nic Mucci	Forward	Canada	Left program
Ben Sokay	Forward	Canada	Graduation
Kris Spriggs	Forward	Canada	Graduation
Cole Weaver	Goaltender	United States	Left program

== Recruiting ==
Player	Position	Nationality	Age	Notes
Matt Cameron	Forward	United States	20	Berwyn, PA
Mike Corson	Goaltender	United States	21	Darien, IL; transfer from Denver
Croix Evingson	Defenseman	United States	23	Anchorage, AK; Selected 211th overall in 2017; transfer from Massachusetts–Lowell
Christian Gorscak	Forward	United States	20	Jeannette, PA
Josef Myšák	Defenseman	Czech Republic	21	Litvínov, CZE
Trevor Poeze	Forward	Canada	21	Mississauga, ON
Jesse Pomeroy	Defenseman	Canada	21	Prince George, BC
Patrick Pugliese	Goaltender	United States	21	Pasadena, CA
Carter Randklev	Forward	United States	20	Moorhead, MN
Walker Sommer	Forward	United States	24	Avon, OH; transfer from Air Force

== Roster ==
As of October 14, 2020.

No.	Nat.	Player	Class	Pos	Height	Weight	DoB	Hometown	Previous team	NHL rights
1	(United States)	Patrick Pugliese	Freshman	G	6' 0" (1.83 m)	180 lb (82 kg)	1999-07-20	Pasadena, California	New Jersey Titans (NAHL)	—
2	(Canada)	Jesse Pomeroy	Freshman	D	6' 2" (1.88 m)	190 lb (86 kg)	1999-05-25	Prince George, British Columbia	Drayton Valley Thunder (AJHL)	—
3	(United States)	Reed Robinson	Junior	F	6' 2" (1.88 m)	205 lb (93 kg)	1998-03-11	Rockwall, Texas	Wilkes-Barre/Scranton (NAHL)	—
4	(Canada)	Chris Harpur (C)	Senior	D	6' 3" (1.91 m)	200 lb (91 kg)	1996-09-13	Niagara-on-the-Lake, Ontario	Cowichan Valley Capitals (BCHL)	—
5	(United States)	Croix Evingson	Junior (RS)	D	6' 5" (1.96 m)	230 lb (104 kg)	1997-08-28	Anchorage, Alaska	Massachusetts–Lowell (HEA)	TBL, 211th overall 2017
7	(United States)	Jordan Wishman	Junior	D	6' 1" (1.85 m)	187 lb (85 kg)	1998-11-22	Des Moines, Iowa	Dubuque Fighting Saints (USHL)	—
8	(United States)	Walker Sommer	Junior (RS)	F	5' 9" (1.75 m)	175 lb (79 kg)	1996-04-29	Avon, Ohio	Air Force (AHA)	—
9	(United States)	Eric Cooley	Senior	F	5' 9" (1.75 m)	175 lb (79 kg)	1998-05-05	Pittsburgh, Pennsylvania	Amarillo Bulls (NAHL)	—
10	(United States)	Carter Randklev	Freshman	F	5' 8" (1.73 m)	163 lb (74 kg)	1999-11-05	Moorhead, Minnesota	Fargo Force (USHL)	—
11	(Sweden)	Scott Persson	Sophomore	D	5' 10" (1.78 m)	180 lb (82 kg)	2000-08-17	Kristianstad, Sweden	Lone Star Brahmas (NAHL)	—
12	(Canada)	Jason Pineo	Sophomore	F	6' 2" (1.88 m)	200 lb (91 kg)	1998-02-23	Toronto, Ontario	Oakville Blades (OJHL)	—
13	(United States)	Zac Herrmann	Junior	D	6' 0" (1.83 m)	185 lb (84 kg)	1997-11-06	Lancaster, New York	Odessa Jackalopes (NAHL)	—
14	(United States)	Ryan Naumovski	Sophomore	F	6' 0" (1.83 m)	150 lb (68 kg)	1999-07-28	Shelby Township, Michigan	New Jersey Titans (NAHL)	—
15	(United States)	Matt Cameron	Freshman	F	5' 11" (1.8 m)	185 lb (84 kg)	2000-06-08	Berwyn, Pennsylvania	New Jersey Titans (NAHL)	—
16	(United States)	Jared Brandt	Senior (RS)	D	6' 0" (1.83 m)	195 lb (88 kg)	1995-10-26	St. Louis, Missouri	Miami (NCHC)	—
17	(United States)	Luke Edgerton	Junior	F	5' 10" (1.78 m)	180 lb (82 kg)	1997-05-01	Wheeling, West Virginia	Jersey Hitmen (NCDC)	—
18	(United States)	Dylan Mills	Junior	F	6' 3" (1.91 m)	205 lb (93 kg)	1999-08-18	Cottage Grove, Minnesota	Sioux City Musketeers (USHL)	—
19	(Canada)	Ryan Cox	Junior	F	5' 11" (1.8 m)	195 lb (88 kg)	1998-07-23	St. Albert, Alberta	Sherwood Park Crusaders (AJHL)	—
20	(United States)	Christian Gorsack	Freshman	F	5' 11" (1.8 m)	183 lb (83 kg)	2000-06-08	Jeannette, Pennsylvania	Johnstown Tomahawks (NAHL)	—
21	(United States)	Justin Kendall	Senior	F	6' 0" (1.83 m)	180 lb (82 kg)	1998-05-07	Holmen, Wisconsin	Coulee Region Chill (NAHL)	—
22	(United States)	Alex Truscott	Junior	F	5' 8" (1.73 m)	170 lb (77 kg)	1998-03-23	Draper, Utah	Minnesota Wilderness (NAHL)	—
23	(Canada)	Cam Cook	Junior	F	5' 11" (1.8 m)	188 lb (85 kg)	1997-11-13	Halifax, Nova Scotia	Shreveport Mudbugs (NAHL)	—
24	(Czech Republic)	Josef Myšák	Freshman	D	6' 3" (1.91 m)	215 lb (98 kg)	1999-09-08	Litvínov, Czech Republic	Austin Bruins (NAHL)	—
25	(Canada)	Jon Hill	Junior	D	6' 2" (1.88 m)	200 lb (91 kg)	1998-10-09	Whitby, Ontario	Brockville Braves (CCHL)	—
26	(Canada)	Brandon Stanley	Junior	F	6' 2" (1.88 m)	202 lb (92 kg)	1997-05-03	Sioux Lookout, Ontario	Philadelphia Rebels (NAHL)	—
27	(United States)	Jack Billings	Senior (RS)	F	5' 9" (1.75 m)	190 lb (86 kg)	1995-10-04	Oak Lawn, Illinois	Salve Regina (CCC)	—
28	(United States)	Jack Zielinski	Senior	D	6' 2" (1.88 m)	205 lb (93 kg)	1996-08-08	Richmond, Virginia	Lone Star Brahmas (NAHL)	—
29	(Sweden)	Ludwig Stenlund	Junior	F	6' 3" (1.91 m)	190 lb (86 kg)	1997-04-16	Skellefteå, Sweden	Madison Capitols (USHL)	—
31	(United States)	Chad Veltri	Sophomore	G	5' 11" (1.8 m)	187 lb (85 kg)	1998-06-03	Pittsburgh, Pennsylvania	Youngstown Phantoms (USHL)	—
33	(Canada)	Brian Wilson	Senior	G	6' 4" (1.93 m)	185 lb (84 kg)	1996-09-27	Pickering, Ontario	Powell River Kings (BCHL)	—
35	(United States)	Mike Corson	Junior	G	6' 3" (1.91 m)	195 lb (88 kg)	1999-04-22	Darien, Illinois	Denver (NCHC)	—
37	(Canada)	Trevor Poeze	Freshman	F	5' 10" (1.78 m)	180 lb (82 kg)	1999-07-17	Mississauga, Ontario	Kanata Lasers (CCHL)	—

== Standings ==
2020–21 Atlantic Hockey Standings
	Conference record											Overall record					
	GP	W	L	T	OW	OL	SW	PTS	PT%	GF	GA	GP	W	L	T	GF	GA
#15 American International †*	12	11	1	0	1	0	0	32	.889	47	18	19	15	4	0	67	40
Army	15	10	4	1	3	1	1	30	.667	42	33	22	15	6	1	71	48
Robert Morris	15	10	5	0	2	1	0	29	.644	58	48	24	15	9	0	85	69
Canisius	13	8	5	0	1	1	0	24	.615	42	34	17	11	6	0	59	46
RIT	13	7	5	1	0	0	1	23	.590	43	40	20	9	9	2	68	70
Sacred Heart	13	6	6	1	1	2	0	20	.513	35	38	18	6	10	2	43	59
Mercyhurst	16	7	8	1	1	1	1	23	.479	54	50	21	8	12	1	64	67
Bentley	15	4	11	0	1	5	0	16	.356	35	48	16	5	11	0	42	51
Niagara	15	3	9	3	0	2	1	15	.333	39	53	22	7	12	3	57	70
Air Force	13	3	9	1	2	1	0	9	.231	32	49	14	3	10	1	35	56
Holy Cross	12	3	9	0	2	0	0	7	.194	22	38	16	4	12	0	30	52
Championship: March 20, 2021 † indicates conference regular season champion * indicates conference tournament champion (Riley Trophy); Rankings: USCHO.com Top 20 Poll

== Schedule and results ==
Date	Time	Opponent^{#}	Rank^{#}	Site	TV	Decision	Result	Attendance	Record
Regular season
December 5	5:05 PM	at RIT		Gene Polisseni Center • Henrietta, New York		Veltri	T 3–3 ^{SOL}	0	0–0–1 (0–0–1)
December 6	5:05 PM	vs. RIT		Dwyer Arena • Lewiston, New York		Veltri	L 1–5	0	0–1–1 (0–1–1)
December 9	5:00 PM	vs. #7 Clarkson*		Dwyer Arena • Lewiston, New York		Corson	W 4–1	0	1–1–1
December 16	5:05 PM	at Mercyhurst		Mercyhurst Ice Center • Erie, Pennsylvania		Veltri	T 3–3 ^{SOL}	0	1–1–2 (0–1–2)
December 18	7:00 PM	vs. Mercyhurst		Dwyer Arena • Lewiston, New York		Veltri	L 4–7	0	1–2–2 (0–2–2)
December 22	3:00 PM	vs. RIT		Dwyer Arena • Lewiston, New York		Veltri	L 4–5	0	1–3–2 (0–3–2)
December 29	5:00 PM	at #10 Clarkson*		Cheel Arena • Potsdam, New York		Corson	L 3–6	0	1–4–2
December 31	2:00 PM	vs. Robert Morris		Dwyer Arena • Lewiston, New York		Corson	L 1–6	0	1–5–2 (0–4–2)
January 2	5:00 PM	vs. Air Force		Dwyer Arena • Lewiston, New York		Corson	W 7–2	0	2–5–2 (1–4–2)
January 4	5:05 PM	vs. Air Force		Dwyer Arena • Lewiston, New York		Corson	T 1–1 ^{SOW}	0	2–5–3 (1–4–3)
January 7	5:00 PM	vs. #20 Robert Morris		Dwyer Arena • Lewiston, New York		Corson	L 2–3 ^{OT}	0	2–6–3 (1–5–3)
January 9	7:35 PM	at #20 Robert Morris		Clearview Arena • Neville Township, Pennsylvania		Corson	L 4–5 ^{OT}	0	2–7–3 (1–6–3)
January 10	4:00 PM	at #20 Robert Morris		Clearview Arena • Neville Township, Pennsylvania		Wilson	L 2–6	0	2–8–3 (1–7–3)
February 19	7:05 PM	at Mercyhurst		Mercyhurst Ice Center • Erie, Pennsylvania		Veltri	L 0–1	0	2–9–3 (1–8–3)
February 20	7:00 PM	vs. Mercyhurst		Dwyer Arena • Lewiston, New York		Veltri	W 2–1	0	3–9–3 (2–8–3)
February 26	7:30 PM	vs. Canisius		Dwyer Arena • Lewiston, New York		Veltri	L 1–5	0	3–10–3 (2–9–3)
February 27	7:05 PM	at Canisius		LECOM Harborcenter • Buffalo, New York		Veltri	W 4–0	0	4–10–3 (3–9–3)
Atlantic Hockey Tournament
March 8	5:00 PM	at Mercyhurst*		Mercyhurst Ice Center • Erie, Pennsylvania (Atlantic Hockey First Round)		Veltri	W 3–2	163	5–10–3
March 12	5:00 PM	at Robert Morris*		Clearview Arena • Neville Township, Pennsylvania (Atlantic Hockey Quarterfinals Game 1)		Veltri	L 2–3 ^{OT}	0	5–11–3
March 13	7:05 PM	at Robert Morris*		Clearview Arena • Neville Township, Pennsylvania (Atlantic Hockey Quarterfinals Game 2)		Veltri	W 3–2 ^{2OT}	0	6–11–3
March 14	7:05 PM	at Robert Morris*		Clearview Arena • Neville Township, Pennsylvania (Atlantic Hockey Quarterfinals Game 3)		Veltri	W 2–1	0	7–11–3
Niagara Won Series 2–1
March 19	2:00 PM	at #15 American International*		MassMutual Center • Springfield, Massachusetts (Atlantic Hockey Semifinals)		Veltri	L 1–2	0	7–12–3
*Non-conference game. ^{#}Rankings from USCHO.com Poll. All times are in Eastern Time.

== Scoring statistics ==
Name	Position	Games	Goals	Assists	Points	PIM
Walker Sommer	C	18	8	7	15	19
Ludwig Stenlund	C	17	7	7	14	2
Jack Billings	F	20	7	6	13	6
Ryan Naumovski	F	22	3	10	13	0
Croix Evingson	D	21	1	11	12	16
Ryan Cox	F	22	7	4	11	18
Jared Brandt	D	18	2	7	9	10
Eric Cooley	RW	21	4	4	8	18
Chris Harpur	D	15	0	8	8	38
Justin Kendall	F	19	3	4	7	6
Brandon Stanley	F	17	2	5	7	14
Christian Gorscak	F	21	2	5	7	8
Luke Edgerton	F	16	1	5	6	0
Carter Randklev	F	13	3	2	5	6
Josef Mysak	D	17	2	3	5	12
Zach Herrmann	D	14	1	3	4	6
Jason Pineo	C	21	3	0	3	8
Matt Cameron	F	4	1	1	2	0
Jesse Pomeroy	D	13	0	2	2	4
Dylan Mills	C	6	0	1	1	2
Reed Robinson	F	2	0	0	0	0
Brian Wilson	G	3	0	0	0	0
Cam Cook	F	4	0	0	0	0
Scott Persson	D	7	0	0	0	2
Mike Corson	G	8	0	0	0	0
Jon Hill	D	12	0	0	0	6
Chad Veltri	G	14	0	0	0	0
Alex Truscott	F	15	0	0	0	2
Jack Zielinski	D	16	0	0	0	17
Jordan Wishman	D	18	0	0	0	12
Bench	-	-	-	-	-	10
Total			57	95	152	242

== Goaltending statistics ==
Name	Games	Minutes	Wins	Losses	Ties	Goals against	Saves	Shut outs	SV %	GAA
Chad Veltri	14	828	5	7	2	36	385	1	.914	2.61
Mike Corson	8	439	2	4	1	24	224	0	.903	3.28
Brian Wilson	3	88	0	1	0	9	28	0	.757	6.10
Empty Net	-	15	-	-	-	1	-	-	-	-
Total	10	1371	7	12	3	70	637	1	.901	3.06

== Rankings ==
Poll	Week																					
Poll	Pre	1	2	3	4	5	6	7	8	9	10	11	12	13	14	15	16	17	18	19	20	21 (Final)
USCHO.com	NR	NR	NR	NR	NR	NR	NR	NR	NR	NR	NR	NR	NR	NR	NR	NR	NR	NR	NR	NR	-	NR
USA Today	NR	NR	NR	NR	NR	NR	NR	NR	NR	NR	NR	NR	NR	NR	NR	NR	NR	NR	NR	NR	NR	NR

USCHO did not release a poll in week 20.

== Awards and honors ==
Player	Award	Ref
Josef Mysak	Atlantic Hockey Rookie Team	
