= 2020–21 Robert Morris Colonials men's ice hockey season =

- Conference: 3rd Atlantic Hockey
- Home ice: Clearview Arena

Rankings
- USCHO.com: NR
- USA Today/ US Hockey Magazine: NR

Record
- Overall: 15–9–0
- Conference: 10–5–0–2–1–0
- Home: 11–4–0
- Road: 4–5–0
- Neutral: 0–0–0

Coaches and captains
- Head coach: Derek Schooley
- Assistant coaches: Mike Corbett; Ryan Durocher
- Captain(s): Nick Jenny; Nick Prkusic
- Alternate captain(s): Brendon Michaelian; Aidan Spellacy

The 2020–21 Robert Morris Colonials men's ice hockey season was the 17th season of play for the program and the 11th season in the Atlantic Hockey conference. The Colonials represented Robert Morris University and were coached by Derek Schooley, in his 17th season.

== Season ==
As a result of the ongoing COVID-19 pandemic the entire college ice hockey season was delayed. Because the NCAA had previously announced that all winter sports athletes would retain whatever eligibility they possessed through at least the following year, none of Canisius' players would lose a season of play. However, the NCAA also approved a change in its transfer regulations that would allow players to transfer and play immediately rather than having to sit out a season, as the rules previously required.

Robert Morris began the season well and continued their strong play for most of the year. The team was buoyed by the addition of two freshman, Randy Hernández and Noah West, who made major contributions to the offense and defense respectively. By mid-January RMU found themselves ranked in the top 20 with an 11–3 record and a chance to make the NCAA Tournament without having to win their conference tournament, a rarity for Atlantic Hockey. Unfortunately, the team was hit by several COVID cancellations and ended up losing 4 of their final 7 games entering the Atlantic Hockey Tournament. It was still possible for the Colonials to make the tournament without an Atlantic Hockey Championship, but any chance the team had was washed away when the offense faltered against Niagara and the team was knocked out in the quarterfinals.

On May 26, 2021, it was announced that Robert Morris University would be ending both its men and women's varsity hockey programs, effective immediately.

== Departures ==
Player	Position	Nationality	Cause
Jake Coleman	Forward	United States	Graduation
Mike Coyne	Forward	United States	Graduation
Sean Giles	Defenseman	United States	Graduation (Signed with Knoxville Ice Bears)
Aidan Girduckis	Defenseman	Canada	Transferred to Chatham
Kip Hoffmann	Forward	United States	Transferred to Illinois
Justin Kapelmaster	Goaltender	United States	Graduation (Signed with Allen Americans)
Luke Lynch	Forward	United States	Graduation (Signed with Wheeling Nailers)
Daniel Mantenuto	Forward	Canada	Graduation (Signed with Asiago Hockey 1935)
Alexander Robert	Defenseman	United States	Graduation

== Recruiting ==
Player	Position	Nationality	Age	Notes
Matthew Guerra	Forward	United States	21	Sanford, FL
Gavin Gulash	Forward	United States	21	Red Bank, NJ
Kyler Head	Forward	United States	21	Malone, NY
Randy Hernández	Forward	Canada	21	Miami, FL
Matt Hutton	Forward	United States	21	Carmel, IN
Brian Kramer	Defenseman	United States	20	Wexford, PA
David Lafrance	Defenseman	Canada	19	Ottawa, ON; returned to juniors (Rockland Nationals)
Jordan Timmons	Forward	United States	21	Bridgeville, PA; transfer from Connecticut
Noah West	Goaltender	United States	19	Pittsboro, IN

== Roster ==
As of December 31, 2020.

No.	Nat.	Player	Class	Pos	Height	Weight	DoB	Hometown	Previous team	NHL rights
2	(United States)	Brendon Michaelian	Junior	D	6' 0" (1.83 m)	172 lb (78 kg)	1997-12-07	Wixom, Michigan	Amarillo Bulls (NAHL)	—
3	(United States)	Nolan Schaeffer	Junior	D	6' 3" (1.91 m)	220 lb (100 kg)	1997-07-15	Marshall, Minnesota	Fairbanks Ice Dogs (NAHL)	—
4	(United States)	Tyler Love	Sophomore	D	5' 11" (1.8 m)	175 lb (79 kg)	2000-03-16	Moon Township, Pennsylvania	Corpus Christi IceRays (NAHL)	—
5	(Canada)	David Lafrance	Freshman	D	6' 1" (1.85 m)	165 lb (75 kg)	2001-05-17	Ottawa, Ontario	Rockland Nationals (CCHL)	—
6	(Canada)	Darcy Walsh	Sophomore	F	5' 11" (1.8 m)	165 lb (75 kg)	1999-02-06	Gloucester, Ontario	Ottawa Jr. Senators (CCHL)	—
7	(United States)	Nick Jenny	Senior	D	5' 10" (1.78 m)	185 lb (84 kg)	1996-06-23	Strongsville, Ohio	Aberdeen Wings (NAHL)	—
8	(United States)	Aidan Spellacy	Junior	D	5' 11" (1.8 m)	175 lb (79 kg)	1998-06-13	Lakewood, Ohio	Lone Star Brahmas (NAHL)	—
9	(United States)	Jordan Timmons	Junior	F	6' 0" (1.83 m)	215 lb (98 kg)	1998-10-25	Bridgeville, Pennsylvania	Connecticut (HEA)	—
10	(Canada)	Nick Lalonde	Junior	F	5' 9" (1.75 m)	175 lb (79 kg)	1998-01-30	Brooklin, Ontario	Ottawa Jr. Senators (CCHL)	—
11	(United States)	Brian Kramer	Freshman	D	5' 11" (1.8 m)	177 lb (80 kg)	2000-07-20	Wexford, Pennsylvania	Fargo Force (USHL)	—
12	(Canada)	Garrett Clegg	Sophomore	F	5' 11" (1.8 m)	185 lb (84 kg)	2000-01-13	St. Albert, Alberta	Sherwood Park Crusaders (AJHL)	—
14	(Canada)	Grant Hebert	Junior	F	6' 3" (1.91 m)	190 lb (86 kg)	1997-05-22	St. Andrews West, Ontario	Fargo Force (USHL)	—
15	(United States)	Roman Kraemer	Sophomore	F	5' 10" (1.78 m)	195 lb (88 kg)	1998-01-09	Pittsburgh, Pennsylvania	Johnstown Tomahawks (NAHL)	—
16	(Canada)	Nick Prkusic (C)	Senior	F	6' 3" (1.91 m)	205 lb (93 kg)	1996-11-10	St. Albert, Alberta	Brooks Bandits (AJHL)	—
17	(United States)	Aiden Beck	Junior	F	6' 2" (1.88 m)	185 lb (84 kg)	1998-08-28	Coraopolis, Pennsylvania	Springfield Jr. Blues (NAHL)	—
18	(United States)	Gavin Gulash	Freshman	F	6' 2" (1.88 m)	190 lb (86 kg)	1999-01-11	Red Bank, New Jersey	New Jersey Titans (NAHL)	—
19	(United States)	Randy Hernandez	Freshman	F	6' 0" (1.83 m)	188 lb (85 kg)	1999-01-12	Miami, Florida	Brooks Bandits (AJHL)	—
20	(Canada)	Cameron Hebert	Sophomore	F	6' 1" (1.85 m)	175 lb (79 kg)	1999-03-17	St. Andrews West, Ontario	Johnstown Tomahawks (NAHL)	—
21	(France)	Justin Addamo	Junior	F	6' 6" (1.98 m)	227 lb (103 kg)	1998-05-27	Clermont-Ferrand, France	Lone Star Brahmas (NAHL)	—
22	(United States)	Matthew Guerra	Freshman	F	5' 10" (1.78 m)	181 lb (82 kg)	1999-05-21	Sanford, Florida	Lone Star Brahmas (NAHL)	—
23	(Canada)	Geoff Lawson	Junior	D	6' 0" (1.83 m)	200 lb (91 kg)	1997-05-15	Metcalfe, Ontario	Wellington Dukes (OJHL)	—
24	(United States)	Kyler Head	Freshman	F	6' 4" (1.93 m)	210 lb (95 kg)	1999-07-13	Malone, New York	New Jersey Titans (NAHL)	—
25	(Canada)	Bradley Stonnell	Sophomore	D	5' 11" (1.8 m)	170 lb (77 kg)	1998-07-22	Surrey, British Columbia	Drumheller (AJHL)	—
26	(Finland)	Santeri Hartikainen	Sophomore	F	6' 2" (1.88 m)	190 lb (86 kg)	1999-01-05	Helsinki, Finland	Corpus Christi IceRays (NAHL)	—
27	(United States)	Matt Hutton	Freshman	F	6' 1" (1.85 m)	190 lb (86 kg)	1999-04-01	Carmel, Indiana	Shreveport Mudbugs (NAHL)	—
30	(Canada)	Reid Cooper	Junior	G	6' 2" (1.88 m)	185 lb (84 kg)	1998-07-01	Corman Park, Saskatchewan	Salmon Arm Silverbacks (BCHL)	—
31	(United States)	Noah West	Freshman	G	6' 2" (1.88 m)	185 lb (84 kg)	2000-11-25	Pittsboro, Indiana	Jamestown Rebels (NAHL)	—
35	(United States)	Dyllan Lubbesmeyer	Senior	G	6' 0" (1.83 m)	185 lb (84 kg)	1996-12-06	Burnsville, Minnesota	Shreveport Mudbugs (NAHL)	—
44	(United States)	Quinn Warmuth	Sophomore	D	6' 4" (1.93 m)	205 lb (93 kg)	1999-09-22	Olmsted Falls, Ohio	Johnstown Tomahawks (NAHL)	—

== Standings ==
2020–21 Atlantic Hockey Standings
	Conference record											Overall record					
	GP	W	L	T	OW	OL	SW	PTS	PT%	GF	GA	GP	W	L	T	GF	GA
#15 American International †*	12	11	1	0	1	0	0	32	.889	47	18	19	15	4	0	67	40
Army	15	10	4	1	3	1	1	30	.667	42	33	22	15	6	1	71	48
Robert Morris	15	10	5	0	2	1	0	29	.644	58	48	24	15	9	0	85	69
Canisius	13	8	5	0	1	1	0	24	.615	42	34	17	11	6	0	59	46
RIT	13	7	5	1	0	0	1	23	.590	43	40	20	9	9	2	68	70
Sacred Heart	13	6	6	1	1	2	0	20	.513	35	38	18	6	10	2	43	59
Mercyhurst	16	7	8	1	1	1	1	23	.479	54	50	21	8	12	1	64	67
Bentley	15	4	11	0	1	5	0	16	.356	35	48	16	5	11	0	42	51
Niagara	15	3	9	3	0	2	1	15	.333	39	53	22	7	12	3	57	70
Air Force	13	3	9	1	2	1	0	9	.231	32	49	14	3	10	1	35	56
Holy Cross	12	3	9	0	2	0	0	7	.194	22	38	16	4	12	0	30	52
Championship: March 20, 2021 † indicates conference regular season champion * indicates conference tournament champion (Riley Trophy); Rankings: USCHO.com Top 20 Poll

== Schedule and results ==
Date	Time	Opponent^{#}	Rank^{#}	Site	TV	Decision	Result	Attendance	Record
Regular season
November 21	7:05 PM	vs. Alabama–Huntsville*		Clearview Arena • Neville Township, Pennsylvania		Lubbesmeyer	W 5–2	0	1–0–0
November 22	4:05 PM	vs. Alabama–Huntsville*		Clearview Arena • Neville Township, Pennsylvania		Cooper	W 4–3	0	2–0–0
November 27	5:05 PM	vs. Canisius		Clearview Arena • Neville Township, Pennsylvania		West	L 2–5	0	2–1–0 (0–1–0)
November 28	4:05 PM	vs. Canisius		Clearview Arena • Neville Township, Pennsylvania		Lubbesmeyer	W 5–4	0	3–1–0 (1–1–0)
December 1	7:00 PM	vs. #18 Bowling Green*		Clearview Arena • Neville Township, Pennsylvania		Lubbesmeyer	L 3–6	0	3–2–0
December 4	9:05 PM	at Air Force		Cadet Ice Arena • Colorado Springs, Colorado		West	W 4–1	0	4–2–0 (2–1–0)
December 5	6:05 PM	at Air Force		Cadet Ice Arena • Colorado Springs, Colorado		West	W 4–2	0	5–2–0 (3–1–0)
December 29	3:07 PM	at #7 Bowling Green*		Slater Family Ice Arena • Bowling Green, Ohio		West	L 1–2	0	5–3–0
December 31	2:00 PM	at Niagara		Dwyer Arena • Lewiston, New York		West	W 6–1	0	6–3–0 (4–1–0)
January 2	7:30 PM	vs. RIT		Clearview Arena • Neville Township, Pennsylvania		West	W 3–1	0	7–3–0 (5–1–0)
January 3	4:00 PM	vs. RIT		Clearview Arena • Neville Township, Pennsylvania		West	W 4–3	0	8–3–0 (6–1–0)
January 7	5:00 PM	at Niagara	#20	Dwyer Arena • Lewiston, New York		West	W 3–2 ^{OT}	0	9–3–0 (7–1–0)
January 9	7:35 PM	vs. Niagara	#20	Clearview Arena • Neville Township, Pennsylvania		Lubbesmeyer	W 5–4 ^{OT}	0	10–3–0 (8–1–0)
January 10	4:00 PM	vs. Niagara	#20	Clearview Arena • Neville Township, Pennsylvania		West	W 6–2	0	11–3–0 (9–1–0)
January 19	4:30 PM	at Mercyhurst	#17	Mercyhurst Ice Center • Erie, Pennsylvania		West	L 2–3 ^{OT}	127	11–4–0 (9–2–0)
January 20	4:35 PM	at Mercyhurst	#17	Mercyhurst Ice Center • Erie, Pennsylvania		Lubbesmeyer	L 5–7	75	11–5–0 (9–3–0)
January 30	7:30 PM	vs. Mercyhurst		Clearview Arena • Neville Township, Pennsylvania		Lubbesmeyer	W 5–3	0	12–5–0 (10–3–0)
February 4	7:30 PM	vs. Long Island*	#19	Clearview Arena • Neville Township, Pennsylvania		Lubbesmeyer	W 4–1	0	13–5–0
February 5	3:00 PM	vs. Long Island*	#19	Clearview Arena • Neville Township, Pennsylvania		West	W 4–0	0	14–5–0
February 20	7:05 PM	at RIT	#19	Gene Polisseni Center • Henrietta, New York		West	L 1–6	0	14–6–0 (10–4–0)
February 21	5:00 PM	at RIT	#19	Gene Polisseni Center • Henrietta, New York		West	L 3–4	0	14–7–0 (10–5–0)
Atlantic Hockey Tournament
March 12	7:00 PM	vs. Niagara*		Clearview Arena • Neville Township, Pennsylvania (Quarterfinal Game 1)		West	W 3–2 ^{OT}	0	15–7–0
March 13	7:05 PM	vs. Niagara*		Clearview Arena • Neville Township, Pennsylvania (Quarterfinal Game 2)		West	L 2–3 ^{2OT}	0	15–8–0
March 14	7:05 PM	vs. Niagara*		Clearview Arena • Neville Township, Pennsylvania (Quarterfinal Game 3)		West	L 1–2	0	15–9–0
Robert Morris Lost Series 1–2
*Non-conference game. ^{#}Rankings from USCHO.com Poll. All times are in Eastern Time.

== Scoring Statistics ==
Name	Position	Games	Goals	Assists	Points	PIM
Randy Hernández	RW	24	11	14	25	2
Nick Prkusic	F	24	7	18	25	12
Grant Hebert	C	24	8	15	23	18
Nick Jenny	D	24	6	13	19	4
Justin Addamo	RW	21	8	7	15	53
Brendan Michaelian	D	24	4	11	15	8
Santeri Hartikainen	C/RW	21	5	9	14	6
Nick Lalonde	RW	24	6	7	13	6
Brian Kramer	D	22	0	12	12	32
Jordan Timmons	F	13	9	2	11	4
Aidan Spellacy	F	24	5	6	11	6
Matthew Guerra	F	16	3	4	7	12
Nolan Schaeffer	D	24	2	5	7	12
Cameron Hebert	RW	15	3	3	6	6
Kyler Head	F	23	2	4	6	17
Gavin Gulash	F	22	1	4	5	12
David Lafrance	D	14	1	3	4	0
Tyler Love	RW	24	0	4	4	4
Roman Kraemer	F	22	2	1	3	6
Geoff Lawson	D	15	0	3	3	4
Darcy Walsh	C	15	2	0	2	19
Bradley Stonnell	D	6	0	2	2	0
Garrett Clegg	RW	10	0	2	2	19
Reid Cooper	G	2	0	0	0	0
Matt Hutton	F	2	0	0	0	0
Quinn Warmuth	D	3	0	0	0	0
Dyllan Lubbesmeyer	G	7	0	0	0	0
Noah West	G	19	0	0	0	0
Bench	-	-	-	-	-	10
Total			85	149	234	272

== Goaltending statistics ==
Name	Games	Minutes	Wins	Losses	Ties	Goals against	Saves	Shut outs	SV %	GAA
Noah West	19	1082	9	7	0	48	520	1	.915	2.66
Dyllan Lubbesmeyer	7	313	5	2	0	14	131	0	.903	2.68
Reid Cooper	2	71	1	0	0	4	22	0	.846	3.35
Empty Net	-	14	-	-	-	3	-	-	-	-
Total	24	1480	15	9	0	69	673	1	.907	2.80

== Rankings ==
Poll	Week																					
Poll	Pre	1	2	3	4	5	6	7	8	9	10	11	12	13	14	15	16	17	18	19	20	21 (Final)
USCHO.com	NR	NR	NR	NR	NR	20	NR	NR	20	17	17	NR	19	19	19	NR	NR	NR	NR	NR	-	NR
USA Today	NR	NR	NR	NR	NR	NR	NR	NR	NR	NR	NR	NR	NR	NR	NR	NR	NR	NR	NR	NR	NR	NR

USCHO did not release a poll in week 20.

== Awards and honors ==
Player	Award	Ref
Nick Prkusic	Atlantic Hockey Player of the Year	
Randy Hernández	Atlantic Hockey Rookie of the Year	
Nick Jenny	Atlantic Hockey Best Defenseman	
Nick Jenny	Atlantic Hockey Individual Sportsmanship Award	
Derek Schooley	Atlantic Hockey Coach of the Year	
Nick Jenny	Atlantic Hockey First Team	
Nick Prkusic	Atlantic Hockey First Team	
Noah West	Atlantic Hockey Second Team	
Brendan Michaelian	Atlantic Hockey Second Team	
Randy Hernández	Atlantic Hockey Second Team	
Noah West	Atlantic Hockey Rookie Team	
Brian Kramer	Atlantic Hockey Rookie Team	
Randy Hernández	Atlantic Hockey Rookie Team	
