= 2020–21 Army Black Knights men's ice hockey season =

- Conference: 2nd Atlantic Hockey
- Home ice: Tate Rink

Rankings
- USCHO: NR
- USA Today: NR

Record
- Overall: 15–6–1
- Conference: 10–4–1–1
- Home: 10–3–0–0
- Road: 5–2–1–1
- Neutral: 0–1–0

Coaches and captains
- Head coach: Brian Riley
- Assistant coaches: Zach McKelvie; Arlen Marshall; Ross Chicantek
- Captain: Matt Berkovitz
- Alternate captain(s): John Zimmerman; Colin Bilek

The 2020–21 Army Black Knights men's ice hockey season was the 118th season of play for the program, the 111th at the Division I level, and the 18th season in the Atlantic Hockey conference. The Black Knights represented the United States Military Academy in the 2020–21 NCAA Division I men's ice hockey season and were coached by Brian Riley, in his 17th season.

== Departures ==
Player	Position	Nationality	Cause
Zach Evancho	Forward	United States	Graduation (retired)
Dominic Franco	Forward	United States	Graduation (signed with Rochester Americans)
Bryan Gerstenfeld	Defenseman	United States	Graduation (retired)
Blaine Madson	Goaltender	United States	Graduation (retired)
Matt Penta	Goaltender	United States	Graduation (retired)
Brendan Soucie	Forward	United States	Graduation (signed with Birmingham Bulls)
Alex Wilkinson	Forward	United States	Graduation (retired)
Michael Wilson	Forward	United States	Graduation (retired)

== Recruiting ==
Player	Position	Nationality	Age	Notes
Gavin Abric	Goaltender	United States	19	Hayward, WI
Jake Felker	Forward	United States	20	Omaha, NE
Lincoln Hatten	Forward	United States	20	Allen, TX
Eric Huss	Forward	United States	21	Dallas, TX
Chris Könin	Forward	United States	20	West Kingston, RI
Ricky Lyle	Forward	United States	20	Duluth, MN
Mitch Machlitt	Forward	United States	21	Robbinsdale, MN
Brody Medeiros	Defenseman	United States	21	Littleton, CO

== Roster ==
As of October 17, 2020.

No.	Nat.	Player	Class	Pos	Height	Weight	DoB	Hometown	Previous team	NHL rights
1	(United States)	Gavin Abric	Freshman	G	6' 3" (1.91 m)	170 lb (77 kg)	2001-01-11	Hayward, Wisconsin	New Jersey Hitmen (USPHL)	—
2	(United States)	Thomas Farrell	Sophomore	D	6' 1" (1.85 m)	200 lb (91 kg)	1999-01-18	Mettawa, Illinois	Youngstown Phantoms (USHL)	—
3	(United States)	Cody Fleckenstein	Senior	D	6' 0" (1.83 m)	180 lb (82 kg)	1997-03-31	Fredonia, New York	Corpus Christi IceRays (NAHL)	—
4	(United States)	Coby Mack	Junior	D	6' 3" (1.91 m)	213 lb (97 kg)	1997-10-07	Rapid City, South Dakota	Northern Cyclones (NCDC)	—
5	(United States)	Andrew Quetell	Junior	D	5' 11" (1.8 m)	185 lb (84 kg)	1998-06-21	Cleveland, Ohio	Johnstown Tomahawks (NAHL)	—
6	(United States)	Colin Bilek (C)	Junior	F	5' 11" (1.8 m)	180 lb (82 kg)	1997-06-04	Brighton, Michigan	Northeast Generals (NAHL)	—
7	(United States)	Jake Felker	Freshman	F	5' 11" (1.8 m)	192 lb (87 kg)	2000-03-19	Omaha, Nebraska	Youngstown Phantoms (USHL)	—
8	(United States)	Ricky Lyle	Freshman	F	6' 1" (1.85 m)	187 lb (85 kg)	2000-08-21	Duluth, Minnesota	Madison Capitols (USHL)	—
9	(United States)	Daniel Haider	Junior	F	5' 9" (1.75 m)	175 lb (79 kg)	1997-12-19	Anchorage, Alaska	Fairbanks Ice Dogs (NAHL)	—
10	(United States)	John Laurito	Senior	F	5' 9" (1.75 m)	170 lb (77 kg)	1996-04-19	Johnston, Rhode Island	New Jersey Hitmen (USPHL)	—
11	(United States)	Lincoln Hatten	Freshman	F	6' 3" (1.91 m)	185 lb (84 kg)	2000-03-01	Allen, Texas	Wilkes-Barre/Scranton Knights (NAHL)	—
12	(United States)	John Keranen	Sophomore	F	6' 2" (1.88 m)	190 lb (86 kg)	1998-08-31	Delano, Minnesota	Minnesota Magicians (NAHL)	—
13	(United States)	Tucker DeYoung	Senior	F	6' 0" (1.83 m)	205 lb (93 kg)	1996-03-23	Lake Bluff, Illinois	New Jersey Hitmen (USPHL)	—
15	(United States)	Marshal Plunkett	Junior	D	5' 10" (1.78 m)	175 lb (79 kg)	1998-10-31	West Salem, Wisconsin	Coulee Region Chill (NAHL)	—
16	(United States)	Eric Butte	Junior	F	6' 1" (1.85 m)	185 lb (84 kg)	1997-05-28	Belmont, Massachusetts	Langley Rivermen (BCHL)	—
17	(United States)	Anthony Firriolo	Sophomore	D	5' 11" (1.8 m)	165 lb (75 kg)	1998-07-03	Montville, New Jersey	Corpus Christi IceRays (NAHL)	—
18	(United States)	Mitch Machlitt	Freshman	F	6' 2" (1.88 m)	180 lb (82 kg)	1999-01-15	Robbinsdale, Minnesota	New Jersey Titans (NAHL)	—
19	(United States)	Brett Abdelnour	Sophomore	F	5' 9" (1.75 m)	167 lb (76 kg)	1998-10-23	Macomb, Michigan	Amarillo Bulls (NAHL)	—
20	(United States)	Brody Medeiros	Freshman	D	6' 0" (1.83 m)	200 lb (91 kg)	1999-01-25	Littleton, Colorado	New Jersey Titans (NAHL)	—
21	(United States)	John Zimmerman (C)	Senior	D	5' 10" (1.78 m)	185 lb (84 kg)	1996-05-02	Arlington, Texas	Lone Star Brahmas (NAHL)	—
22	(United States)	Noah Wilson	Sophomore	D	5' 11" (1.8 m)	205 lb (93 kg)	1998-12-21	Fond du Lac, Wisconsin	Fairbanks Ice Dogs (NAHL)	—
23	(United States)	Mason Krueger	Senior	F	5' 11" (1.8 m)	180 lb (82 kg)	1996-07-21	Bettendorf, Iowa	Corpus Christi IceRays (NAHL)	—
24	(United States)	Kevin Dineen	Senior	F	5' 11" (1.8 m)	175 lb (79 kg)	1996-04-02	Faribault, Minnesota	Coulee Region Chill (NAHL)	—
25	(United States)	Patrick Smyth	Sophomore	F	6' 4" (1.93 m)	220 lb (100 kg)	1999-04-23	Toledo, Ohio	Dubuque Fighting Saints (USHL)	—
26	(United States)	Matt Berkovitz (C)	Senior	D	6' 1" (1.85 m)	180 lb (82 kg)	1996-02-16	Green Bay, Wisconsin	Green Bay Gamblers (USHL)	ANA, 123rd overall 2014
27	(United States)	Chris Konin	Freshman	F	6' 1" (1.85 m)	196 lb (89 kg)	2000-01-04	West Kingston, Rhode Island	Minnesota Magicians (NAHL)	—
28	(United States)	Kendrick Frost	Sophomore	F	6' 4" (1.93 m)	195 lb (88 kg)	1999-04-01	Lee's Summit, Missouri	Brookings Blizzard (NAHL)	—
29	(United States)	Eric Huss	Freshman	F	5' 11" (1.8 m)	181 lb (82 kg)	1999-03-16	Dallas, Texas	Lone Star Brahmas (NAHL)	—
33	(United States)	Trevin Kozlowski	Senior	G	6' 4" (1.93 m)	220 lb (100 kg)	1997-03-27	Valencia, California	Salmon Arm Silverbacks (BCHL)	—
34	(United States)	Justin Evenson	Sophomore	G	6' 1" (1.85 m)	160 lb (73 kg)	1999-08-20	Minnetonka, Minnesota	Amarillo Bulls (NAHL)	—

== Standings ==
2020–21 Atlantic Hockey Standings
	Conference record											Overall record					
	GP	W	L	T	OW	OL	SW	PTS	PT%	GF	GA	GP	W	L	T	GF	GA
#15 American International †*	12	11	1	0	1	0	0	32	.889	47	18	19	15	4	0	67	40
Army	15	10	4	1	3	1	1	30	.667	42	33	22	15	6	1	71	48
Robert Morris	15	10	5	0	2	1	0	29	.644	58	48	24	15	9	0	85	69
Canisius	13	8	5	0	1	1	0	24	.615	42	34	17	11	6	0	59	46
RIT	13	7	5	1	0	0	1	23	.590	43	40	20	9	9	2	68	70
Sacred Heart	13	6	6	1	1	2	0	20	.513	35	38	18	6	10	2	43	59
Mercyhurst	16	7	8	1	1	1	1	23	.479	54	50	21	8	12	1	64	67
Bentley	15	4	11	0	1	5	0	16	.356	35	48	16	5	11	0	42	51
Niagara	15	3	9	3	0	2	1	15	.333	39	53	22	7	12	3	57	70
Air Force	13	3	9	1	2	1	0	9	.231	32	49	14	3	10	1	35	56
Holy Cross	12	3	9	0	2	0	0	7	.194	22	38	16	4	12	0	30	52
Championship: March 20, 2021 † indicates conference regular season champion * indicates conference tournament champion (Riley Trophy); Rankings: USCHO.com Top 20 Poll

== Schedule and results ==
Date	Time	Opponent^{#}	Rank^{#}	Site	TV	Decision	Result	Attendance	Record
Regular season
November 14		vs. LIU*		Tate Rink • West Point, New York	Flo		Cancelled		
December 4	5:05 PM	at Bentley		Bentley Arena • Waltham, Massachusetts	Flo	Kozlowski	L 2–4	0	0–1–0 (0–1–0–0)
December 5	6:05 PM	vs. Bentley		Tate Rink • West Point, New York	Flo	Evenson	W 2–0	100	1–1–0 (1–1–0–0)
December 15	5:00 PM	at American International		MassMutual Center • Springfield, Massachusetts	Flo	Kozlowski	L 1–4	0	1–2–0 (1–2–0–0)
December 28		at Union*		Achilles Rink • Schenectady, New York			Cancelled		
January 5		at Holy Cross		Hart Center • Worcester, Massachusetts	Flo		Cancelled		
January 6	5:05 PM	vs. American International		Tate Rink • West Point, New York	Flo	Evenson	L 3–6	7	1–3–0 (1–3–0–0)
January 7	5:05 PM	vs. American International		Tate Rink • West Point, New York	Flo	Kozlowski	L 3–4 ^{OT}	6	1–4–0 (1–4–0–0)
January 10	4:05 PM	at American International		MassMutual Center • Springfield, Massachusetts	Flo	Kozlowski	W 5–3	1	2–4–0 (2–4–0–0)
January 15		at Air Force		Cadet Ice Arena • Colorado Springs, Colorado	Flo		Cancelled		
January 15	5:05 PM	vs. LIU*		Tate Rink • West Point, New York	Flo	Kozlowski	W 5–2	0	3–4–0 (2–4–0–0)
January 16		at Air Force		Cadet Ice Arena • Colorado Springs, Colorado	Flo		Cancelled		
January 16	7:05 PM	vs. LIU*		Tate Rink • West Point, New York	Flo	Evenson	L 2–3 ^{OT}	0	3–5–0 (2–4–0–0)
January 21	6:05 PM	at Holy Cross		Hart Center • Worcester, Massachusetts	Flo	Kozlowski	W 3–2	0	4–5–0 (3–4–0–0)
January 22	6:05 PM	at Holy Cross		Hart Center • Worcester, Massachusetts	Flo	Kozlowski	W 4–1	0	5–5–0 (4–4–0–0)
January 29	5:05 PM	vs. Sacred Heart		Tate Rink • West Point, New York	Flo	Kozlowski	W 2–1	0	6–5–0 (5–4–0–0)
January 30	6:05 PM	at Sacred Heart		Webster Bank Arena • Bridgeport, Connecticut	Flo	Kozlowski	T 2–2 ^{SOW}	0	6–5–1 (5–4–1–1)
February 4		vs. American International		Tate Rink • West Point, New York	Flo		Cancelled		
February 7		at Sacred Heart		Webster Bank Arena • Bridgeport, Connecticut	Flo		Cancelled		
February 8	7:05 PM	at Sacred Heart		Webster Bank Arena • Bridgeport, Connecticut	Flo	Kozlowski	W 3–1	0	7–5–1 (6–4–1–1)
February 9	7:05 PM	vs. Sacred Heart		Tate Rink • West Point, New York	Flo	Kozlowski	W 2–1 ^{OT}	3	8–5–1 (7–4–1–1)
February 12	5:05 PM	at Bentley		Bentley Arena • Waltham, Massachusetts	Flo	Kozlowski	W 3–2 ^{OT}	0	9–5–1 (8–4–1–1)
February 13	7:05 PM	vs. Bentley		Tate Rink • West Point, New York	Flo	Kozlowski	W 5–1	100	10–5–1 (9–4–1–1)
February 16		vs. Holy Cross		Hart Center • Worcester, Massachusetts	Flo		Cancelled		
February 20	7:05 PM	vs. Bentley		Tate Rink • West Point, New York	Flo	Kozlowski	W 2–1 ^{OT}	100	11–5–1 (10–4–1–1)
February 23		vs. Holy Cross		Tate Rink • West Point, New York	Flo		Cancelled		
February 26	5:05 PM	vs. LIU*		Tate Rink • West Point, New York	Flo	Kozlowski	W 5–0	24	12–5–1 (10–4–1–1)
February 27	7:05 PM	vs. LIU*		Tate Rink • West Point, New York	Flo	Kozlowski	W 6–3	86	13–5–1 (10–4–1–1)
Atlantic Hockey Tournament
March 12	5:05 PM	vs. Sacred Heart		Tate Rink • West Point, New York (Quarterfinals)	Flo	Kozlowski	W 4–0	102	14–5–1 (10–4–1–1)
March 13	5:05 PM	vs. Sacred Heart		Tate Rink • West Point, New York (Quarterfinals)	Flo	Kozlowski	W 4–3 ^{3OT}	96	15–5–1 (10–4–1–1)
March 19	7:00 PM	vs. Canisius	#19	MassMutual Center • Springfield, Massachusetts (Semifinals)	Flo	Kozlowski	L 3–4 ^{OT}	0	15–6–1 (10–4–1–1)
*Non-conference game. ^{#}Rankings from USCHO.com Poll. All times are in Eastern Time. Source:

== Scoring statistics ==
Name	Position	Games	Goals	Assists	Points	PIM
Colin Bilek	F	21	18	7	25	20
Mason Krueger	F	20	5	13	18	18
Eric Butte	F	21	6	11	17	16
Mitch Machlitt	F	21	5	10	15	2
John Zimmerman	D	20	1	13	14	22
Anthony Firriolo	D	21	5	8	13	16
Daniel Haider	F	21	6	6	12	2
Thomas Farrell	D	21	4	8	12	10
Lincoln Hatten	F	21	4	8	12	8
Tucker DeYoung	F	20	5	5	10	21
Noah Wilson	D	21	1	5	6	17
Jake Felker	F	21	2	3	5	6
Brett Abdelnour	F	16	2	2	4	4
Matt Berkovitz	D	21	0	4	4	4
John Keranen	F	21	0	4	4	17
Ricky Lyle	F	17	2	1	3	10
John Laurito	F	20	2	1	3	10
Chris Konin	F	13	0	2	2	0
Justin Evenson	G	3	0	1	1	0
Andrew Quetell	D	8	0	1	1	0
Cody Fleckenstein	D	15	0	1	1	0
Eric Huss	F	1	0	0	0	0
Marshal Plunkett	D	5	0	0	0	0
Kevin Dineen	F	13	0	0	0	2
Trevin Kozlowski	G	19	0	0	0	0
Gavin Abric	G	4	0	0	0	0
Bench	-	-	-	-	-	8
Total			68	114	182	213

== Goaltending statistics ==
Statistics through March 14, 2021.

Name	Games	Minutes	Wins	Losses	Ties	Goals against	Saves	Shut outs	SV %	GAA
Trevin Kozlowski	19	1180	14	3	1	36	446	2	.925	1.83
Justin Evenson	3	148	1	2	0	7	63	1	.900	2.84
Empty Net	-	9	-	-	-	1	-	-	-	-
Total	21	1332	15	5	1	44	509	3	.920	1.98

== Rankings ==
Poll	Week																					
Poll	Pre	1	2	3	4	5	6	7	8	9	10	11	12	13	14	15	16	17	18	19	20	21 (Final)
USCHO.com	NR	NR	NR	NR	NR	NR	NR	NR	NR	NR	NR	NR	NR	NR	RV	RV	RV	RV	19	RV	-	NR
USA Today	NR	NR	NR	NR	NR	NR	NR	NR	NR	NR	NR	NR	NR	NR	NR	NR	NR	RV	RV	RV	NR	NR

USCHO did not release a poll in week 20.

== Awards and honors ==
Player	Award	Ref
Trevin Kozlowski	AHCA East Second Team All-American	
Colin Bilek	AHCA East Second Team All-American	
Lincoln Hatten	Atlantic Hockey Rookie of the Year	
Trevin Kozlowski	Atlantic Hockey Regular Season Goaltending Award	
Brian Riley	Atlantic Hockey Coach of the Year	
Trevin Kozlowski	Atlantic Hockey First Team	
Thomas Farrell	Atlantic Hockey First Team	
Colin Bilek	Atlantic Hockey First Team	
John Zimmerman	Atlantic Hockey Second Team	
Lincoln Hatten	Atlantic Hockey Rookie Team	
