= 2020–21 Sacred Heart Pioneers men's ice hockey season =

- Conference: Atlantic Hockey
- Home ice: Webster Bank Arena

Rankings
- USCHO.com: NR
- USA Today/ US Hockey Magazine: NR

Record
- Overall: 6–10–2
- Conference: 6–6–1–1–2–0
- Home: 3–2–2
- Road: 2–8–0
- Neutral: 1–0–0

Coaches and captains
- Head coach: C. J. Marottolo
- Assistant coaches: Scott McDougall; Steve Bergin; Craig Height
- Captain: Marc Johnstone
- Alternate captain(s): Alex Bates; Max Luukko

The 2020–21 Sacred Heart Pioneers men's ice hockey season was the 28th season of play for the program, the 23rd at the Division I level, and the 18th season in the Atlantic Hockey conference. The Pioneers represented Sacred Heart University and were coached by C. J. Marottolo, in his 12th season.

The start of the college hockey season was delayed due to the ongoing coronavirus pandemic. As a result, Sacred Heart's first scheduled game was in late-November as opposed to early-October, which was the norm.

== Season ==
As a result of the ongoing COVID-19 pandemic the entire college ice hockey season was delayed. Because the NCAA had previously announced that all winter sports athletes would retain whatever eligibility they possessed through at least the following year, none of Sacred Heart's players would lose a season of play. However, the NCAA also approved a change in its transfer regulations that would allow players to transfer and play immediately rather than having to sit out a season, as the rules previously required.

Coming off of the best season in the history of the program, Sacred Heart saw a bit of a decline. The team finished 6–10–2 but the record does not reflect the difficulties that the team faced during the season. The Pioneers were not alone in suffering through COVID-related cancellations, but Sacred Heart saw their opposition increase in difficulty as a result. Many of their cancelled games were against weaker teams and the Pioneers added a set of games with Quinnipiac, a team that was ranked throughout the season. Additionally, Sacred Heart played Army (another ranked team) six times during the season, a full third of their games. While SHU kept most of those matches close they did lose to the Black Knights 5 times during the season, which accounts for half of the team's losses. It would be difficult to come away with any conclusions about Sacred Heart's season other than the team had to weather several storms during the year.

== Departures ==
| Player | Position | Nationality | Cause |
|---|---|---|---|
| Drennen Atherton | Goaltender | United States | Transferred to Norwich |
| Vito Bavaro | Forward | United States | Graduation |
| Colin Bernard | Defenseman | United States | Left program |
| Jason Cotton | Forward | United States | Graduation (Signed with Carolina Hurricanes) |
| Jordan Kaplan | Forward | United States | Transferred to Vermont |
| Mike Lee | Defenseman | United States | Graduation (Signed with Indy Fuel) |
| Austin McIlmurray | Forward | United States | Graduation (Signed with Fort Wayne Komets) |
| Matt Tugnutt | Forward | Canada | Transferred to Providence |

== Recruiting ==
| Player | Position | Nationality | Age | Notes |
|---|---|---|---|---|
| Grant Anderson | Defenseman | United States | 21 | Plymouth, MN |
| Ryan Doolin | Forward | United States | 21 | Hanover, MA |
| Carson Gallagher | Forward | Canada | 21 | Courtice, ON |
| Cody Hoban | Forward | United States | 19 | Guilford, CT |
| John Jaworski | Forward | United States | 20 | Grinnell, IA |
| Andrius Kulbis-Marino | Defenseman | United States | 20 | Methuen, MA |
| Emil Öhrvall | Forward | Sweden | 22 | Växjö, SWE; transfer from Michigan |
| Adam Tisdale | Forward | Canada | 21 | Cochrane, AB; transfer from Clarkson |
| David Tomeo | Goaltender | United States | 21 | West Caldwell, NJ |

== Roster ==
As of September 15, 2020.

| No. | Nat. | Player | Class | Pos | Height | Weight | DoB | Hometown | Previous team | NHL rights |
|---|---|---|---|---|---|---|---|---|---|---|
| 3 | (United States) | Grant Anderson | Freshman | D | 6' 2" (1.88 m) | 187 lb (85 kg) | 1999-09-15 | Plymouth, Minnesota | Omaha Lancers (USHL) | — |
| 4 | (Denmark) | Jeppe Urup Morgensen | Sophomore | D | 6' 2" (1.88 m) | 176 lb (80 kg) | 1999-03-14 | Odense, Denmark | Youngstown Phantoms (USHL) | — |
| 5 | (United States) | Andrius Kulbis-Marino | Freshman | D | 6' 1" (1.85 m) | 175 lb (79 kg) | 2000-02-16 | Methuen, Massachusetts | Maine Nordiques (NAHL) | — |
| 6 | (United States) | Max Luukko (A) | Senior | D | 6' 3" (1.91 m) | 190 lb (86 kg) | 1995-12-28 | Avalon, New Jersey | Philadelphia Jr. Flyers (USPHL) | — |
| 7 | (United States) | Daniel Petrick | Sophomore | D | 5' 9" (1.75 m) | 199 lb (90 kg) | 1999-04-06 | Wilbraham, Massachusetts | Madison Capitols (USHL) | — |
| 8 | (United States) | Tim Clifton | Sophomore | F | 5' 10" (1.78 m) | 165 lb (75 kg) | 1998-02-23 | Farmingdale, New Jersey | Shreveport Mudbugs (NAHL) | — |
| 9 | (United States) | John Jaworski | Freshman | F | 5' 10" (1.78 m) | 165 lb (75 kg) | 2000-03-20 | Grinnell, Iowa | Chicago Steel (USHL) | — |
| 10 | (United States) | Alex Bates (A) | Senior | D | 5' 11" (1.8 m) | 175 lb (79 kg) | 1997-06-17 | Parker, Colorado | Wenatchee Wild (BCHL) | — |
| 11 | (Canada) | Ryan Steele | Junior | F | 6' 1" (1.85 m) | 182 lb (83 kg) | 1997-09-13 | Stratford, Prince Edward Island | West Kelowna Warriors (BCHL) | — |
| 12 | (United States) | Kevin Lombardi | Sophomore | F | 6' 4" (1.93 m) | 234 lb (106 kg) | 1998-08-12 | Schwenksville, Pennsylvania | Sioux City Musketeers (USHL) | — |
| 13 | (United States) | Cody Hoban | Freshman | F | 5' 9" (1.75 m) | 165 lb (75 kg) | 2001-04-26 | Guilford, Connecticut | Danbury Jr. Hat Tricks (NAHL) | — |
| 14 | (United States) | Nick Boyagian | Junior | F | 6' 2" (1.88 m) | 181 lb (82 kg) | 1997-07-16 | East Greenbush, New York | New Jersey Titans (NAHL) | — |
| 15 | (United States) | Evan Wisocky | Senior | F | 5' 10" (1.78 m) | 195 lb (88 kg) | 1998-03-20 | Hoboken, New Jersey | Connecticut (HEA) | — |
| 16 | (United States) | Marcus Joseph | Junior | D | 5' 9" (1.75 m) | 180 lb (82 kg) | 1997-05-08 | Mountain Top, Pennsylvania | Nanaimo Clippers (BCHL) | — |
| 17 | (Sweden) | Emil Öhrvall | Junior | F | 5' 11" (1.8 m) | 170 lb (77 kg) | 1998-06-10 | Växjö, Sweden | Michigan (Big Ten) | — |
| 18 | (United States) | Michael Gilroy | Senior | D | 6' 3" (1.91 m) | 205 lb (93 kg) | 1996-10-10 | North Bellmore, New York | P.A.L. Jr. Islanders (USPHL) | — |
| 19 | (United States) | Ryan Doolin | Freshman | F | 6' 2" (1.88 m) | 190 lb (86 kg) | 1999-02-06 | Hanover, Massachusetts | Alberni Valley Bulldogs (BCHL) | — |
| 20 | (Canada) | Adam Tisdale | Junior | F | 5' 9" (1.75 m) | 171 lb (78 kg) | 1998-11-09 | Cochrane, Alberta | Clarkson (ECAC) | — |
| 21 | (Canada) | Josh Allan | Senior | D | 5' 10" (1.78 m) | 200 lb (91 kg) | 1997-05-02 | Orillia, Ontario | Trenton Golden Hawks (OJHL) | — |
| 22 | (United States) | Derek Contessa | Sophomore | F | 6' 0" (1.83 m) | 206 lb (93 kg) | 1999-03-03 | Freehold, New Jersey | Dubuque Fighting Saints (USHL) | — |
| 23 | (Canada) | Braeden Tuck | Sophomore | F | 6' 0" (1.83 m) | 183 lb (83 kg) | 1998-04-15 | Calgary, Alberta | Trail Smoke Eaters (BCHL) | — |
| 24 | (United States) | Austin Magera | Junior | F | 6' 1" (1.85 m) | 185 lb (84 kg) | 1998-07-19 | Suwanee, Georgia | Lincoln Stars (USHL) | — |
| 25 | (Canada) | Carson Gallagher | Freshman | F | 6' 0" (1.83 m) | 174 lb (79 kg) | 1999-08-04 | Courtice, Ontario | Johnstown Tomahawks (NAHL) | — |
| 26 | (United States) | Marc Johnstone (C) | Senior | F | 6' 0" (1.83 m) | 180 lb (82 kg) | 1996-06-19 | Cranford, New Jersey | Chicago Steel (USHL) | — |
| 27 | (United States) | Patrick Dawson | Sophomore | D | 6' 0" (1.83 m) | 190 lb (86 kg) | 1999-01-14 | Medway, Massachusetts | Odessa Jackalopes (NAHL) | — |
| 28 | (United States) | Marcel Godbout | Senior | F | 5' 9" (1.75 m) | 190 lb (86 kg) | 1996-06-04 | St. Clair Shores, Michigan | Sioux City Musketeers (NAHL) | — |
| 29 | (United States) | Todd Goehring | Junior | F | 5' 11" (1.8 m) | 175 lb (79 kg) | 1997-07-08 | Wayside, New Jersey | Chicago Steel (USHL) | — |
| 30 | (United States) | Josh Benson | Junior | G | 6' 1" (1.85 m) | 190 lb (86 kg) | 1997-11-04 | Stillwater, Minnesota | Fairbanks Ice Dogs (NAHL) | — |
| 31 | (United States) | David Tomeo | Freshman | G | 6' 1" (1.85 m) | 180 lb (82 kg) | 1999-03-02 | West Caldwell, New Jersey | Johnstown Tomahawks (NAHL) | — |
| 33 | (Canada) | Luke Lush | Sophomore | G | 6' 2" (1.88 m) | 194 lb (88 kg) | 1998-02-15 | Sherwood Park, Alberta | Drayton Valley Thunder (AJHL) | — |

== Standings ==
2020–21 Atlantic Hockey Standings
| | Conference record | | | | | | | | | | | Overall record | | | | | |
| | GP | W | L | T | OW | OL | SW | PTS | PT% | GF | GA | GP | W | L | T | GF | GA |
|---|---|---|---|---|---|---|---|---|---|---|---|---|---|---|---|---|---|
| #15 American International †* | 12 | 11 | 1 | 0 | 1 | 0 | 0 | 32 | .889 | 47 | 18 | 19 | 15 | 4 | 0 | 67 | 40 |
| Army | 15 | 10 | 4 | 1 | 3 | 1 | 1 | 30 | .667 | 42 | 33 | 22 | 15 | 6 | 1 | 71 | 48 |
| Robert Morris | 15 | 10 | 5 | 0 | 2 | 1 | 0 | 29 | .644 | 58 | 48 | 24 | 15 | 9 | 0 | 85 | 69 |
| Canisius | 13 | 8 | 5 | 0 | 1 | 1 | 0 | 24 | .615 | 42 | 34 | 17 | 11 | 6 | 0 | 59 | 46 |
| RIT | 13 | 7 | 5 | 1 | 0 | 0 | 1 | 23 | .590 | 43 | 40 | 20 | 9 | 9 | 2 | 68 | 70 |
| Sacred Heart | 13 | 6 | 6 | 1 | 1 | 2 | 0 | 20 | .513 | 35 | 38 | 18 | 6 | 10 | 2 | 43 | 59 |
| Mercyhurst | 16 | 7 | 8 | 1 | 1 | 1 | 1 | 23 | .479 | 54 | 50 | 21 | 8 | 12 | 1 | 64 | 67 |
| Bentley | 15 | 4 | 11 | 0 | 1 | 5 | 0 | 16 | .356 | 35 | 48 | 16 | 5 | 11 | 0 | 42 | 51 |
| Niagara | 15 | 3 | 9 | 3 | 0 | 2 | 1 | 15 | .333 | 39 | 53 | 22 | 7 | 12 | 3 | 57 | 70 |
| Air Force | 13 | 3 | 9 | 1 | 2 | 1 | 0 | 9 | .231 | 32 | 49 | 14 | 3 | 10 | 1 | 35 | 56 |
| Holy Cross | 12 | 3 | 9 | 0 | 2 | 0 | 0 | 7 | .194 | 22 | 38 | 16 | 4 | 12 | 0 | 30 | 52 |
Championship: March 20, 2021 † indicates conference regular season champion * indicates conference tournament champion (Riley Trophy); Rankings: USCHO.com Top 20 Poll

== Schedule and results ==
| Date | Time | Opponent^{#} | Rank^{#} | Site | TV | Decision | Result | Attendance | Record |
Regular season
| December 4 | 6:00 PM | at Holy Cross | | Hart Center • Worcester, Massachusetts | | Benson | W 2–1 | 0 | 1–0–0 (1–0–0) |
| December 6 | 2:00 PM | at Holy Cross | | Hart Center • Worcester, Massachusetts | | Benson | L 3–6 | 0 | 1–1–0 (1–1–0) |
| December 14 | 7:00 PM | at #11 Quinnipiac* | | People's United Center • Hamden, Connecticut | | Lush | L 2–9 | 0 | 1–2–0 |
| December 15 | 7:00 PM | at #11 Quinnipiac* | | People's United Center • Hamden, Connecticut | | Benson | L 1–2 ^{OT} | 0 | 1–3–0 |
| January 6 | 3:05 PM | vs. Air Force | | Dwyer Arena • Lewiston, New York | | Benson | W 4–3 ^{OT} | 0 | 2–3–0 (2–1–0) |
| January 26 | 5:00 PM | at #19 American International | | MassMutual Center • Springfield, Massachusetts | | Benson | L 2–8 | 0 | 2–4–0 (2–2–0) |
| January 29 | 5:05 PM | at Army | | Tate Rink • West Point, New York | | Benson | L 1–2 | 0 | 2–5–0 (2–3–0) |
| January 30 | 6:00 PM | vs. Army | | Webster Bank Arena • Bridgeport, Connecticut | | Benson | T 2–2 ^{SOL} | 0 | 2–5–1 (2–3–1) |
| February 4 | 5:05 PM | vs. Bentley | | Bentley Arena • Waltham, Massachusetts | | Benson | W 4–0 | 0 | 3–5–1 (3–3–1) |
| February 5 | 5:05 PM | at Bentley | | Webster Bank Arena • Bridgeport, Connecticut | | Benson | W 4–2 | 0 | 4–5–1 (4–3–1) |
| February 8 | 7:05 PM | vs. Army | | Webster Bank Arena • Bridgeport, Connecticut | | Benson | L 1–3 | 0 | 4–6–1 (4–4–1) |
| February 9 | 5:05 PM | at Army | | Tate Rink • West Point, New York | | Lush | L 1–2 ^{OT} | 3 | 4–7–1 (4–5–1) |
| February 13 | 7:30 PM | vs. St. Lawrence* | | Webster Bank Arena • Bridgeport, Connecticut | | Benson | T 2–2 ^{OT} | 0 | 4–7–2 |
| February 16 | 5:05 PM | vs. Bentley | | Webster Bank Arena • Bridgeport, Connecticut | | Benson | L 4–5 ^{OT} | 0 | 4–8–2 (4–6–1) |
| February 19 | 7:35 PM | vs. Holy Cross | | Webster Bank Arena • Bridgeport, Connecticut | | Lush | W 2–1 | 0 | 5–8–2 (5–6–1) |
| February 20 | 4:05 PM | at Holy Cross | | Webster Bank Arena • Bridgeport, Connecticut | | Lush | W 5–3 | 0 | 6–8–2 (6–6–1) |
Atlantic Hockey Tournament
| March 12 | 5:05 PM | at Army* | | Tate Rink • West Point, New York (Quarterfinal Game 1) | | Lush | L 0–4 | 102 | 6–9–2 |
| March 13 | 5:05 PM | at Army* | | Tate Rink • West Point, New York (Quarterfinal Game 2) | | Benson | L 3–4 ^{3OT} | 96 | 6–10–2 |
Sacred Heart lost series 0–2
*Non-conference game. ^{#}Rankings from USCHO.com Poll. All times are in Eastern Time.

== Scoring statistics ==
| Name | Position | Games | Goals | Assists | Points | PIM |
|---|---|---|---|---|---|---|
| Marc Johnstone | RW | 16 | 6 | 10 | 16 | 12 |
| Braeden Tuck | F | 18 | 6 | 10 | 16 | 0 |
| Austin Magera | C | 17 | 7 | 7 | 14 | 10 |
| Kevin Lombardi | RW | 17 | 8 | 4 | 12 | 2 |
| Ryan Steele | F | 17 | 4 | 8 | 12 | 12 |
| Marcel Godbout | C/RW | 18 | 5 | 6 | 11 | 6 |
| Patrick Dawson | D | 18 | 1 | 6 | 7 | 10 |
| Grant Anderson | D | 18 | 1 | 5 | 6 | 4 |
| Todd Goehring | F | 12 | 1 | 3 | 4 | 4 |
| Josh Allan | D | 13 | 1 | 3 | 4 | 11 |
| Emil Öhrvall | LW | 10 | 1 | 2 | 3 | 8 |
| Nick Boyagian | F | 17 | 1 | 2 | 3 | 4 |
| Jeppe Urup Mogensen | D | 14 | 0 | 2 | 2 | 4 |
| Evan Wisocky | C | 16 | 0 | 2 | 2 | 0 |
| Alex Bates | F | 17 | 0 | 2 | 2 | 17 |
| Tim Clifton | C | 14 | 1 | 0 | 1 | 21 |
| Michael Gilroy | D | 4 | 0 | 1 | 1 | 0 |
| Derek Contessa | RW | 6 | 0 | 1 | 1 | 2 |
| Adam Tisdale | C | 10 | 0 | 1 | 1 | 0 |
| Cody Hoban | F | 10 | 0 | 1 | 1 | 6 |
| Andrius Kulbis-Marino | D | 12 | 0 | 1 | 1 | 4 |
| John Jaworski | F | 16 | 0 | 1 | 1 | 0 |
| Ryan Doolin | F | 4 | 0 | 0 | 0 | 0 |
| Daniel Petrick | D | 5 | 0 | 0 | 0 | 2 |
| Carson Gallagher | C | 5 | 0 | 0 | 0 | 2 |
| Marcus Joseph | D | 6 | 0 | 0 | 0 | 4 |
| Luke Lush | G | 6 | 0 | 0 | 0 | 0 |
| Max Luukko | D | 10 | 0 | 0 | 0 | 6 |
| Josh Benson | G | 14 | 0 | 0 | 0 | 0 |
| Bench | - | - | - | - | - | 6 |
| Total | | | 43 | 78 | 121 | 154 |

== Goaltending statistics ==
| Name | Games | Minutes | Wins | Losses | Ties | Goals against | Saves | Shut outs | SV % | GAA |
|---|---|---|---|---|---|---|---|---|---|---|
| Josh Benson | 14 | 853 | 4 | 7 | 2 | 43 | 383 | 1 | .899 | 3.02 |
| Luke Lush | 6 | 292 | 2 | 3 | 0 | 16 | 125 | 0 | .887 | 3.29 |
| Empty Net | - | 6 | - | - | - | 0 | - | - | - | - |
| Total | 18 | 1152 | 6 | 10 | 2 | 59 | 508 | 1 | .896 | 3.07 |

== Rankings ==
| Poll | Week | | | | | | | | | | | | | | | | | | | | | |
| Poll | Pre | 1 | 2 | 3 | 4 | 5 | 6 | 7 | 8 | 9 | 10 | 11 | 12 | 13 | 14 | 15 | 16 | 17 | 18 | 19 | 20 | 21 (Final) |
|---|---|---|---|---|---|---|---|---|---|---|---|---|---|---|---|---|---|---|---|---|---|---|
| USCHO.com | NR | NR | NR | NR | NR | NR | NR | NR | NR | NR | NR | NR | NR | NR | NR | NR | NR | NR | NR | NR | - | NR |
| USA Today | NR | NR | NR | NR | NR | NR | NR | NR | NR | NR | NR | NR | NR | NR | NR | NR | NR | NR | NR | NR | NR | NR |

USCHO did not release a poll in week 20.

== Awards and honors ==
| Player | Award | Ref |
|---|---|---|
| Marc Johnstone | Atlantic Hockey First Team | |
| Braeden Tuck | Atlantic Hockey Second Team | |
