= 2020–21 Bentley Falcons men's ice hockey season =

- Conference: Atlantic Hockey
- Home ice: Bentley Arena

Rankings
- USCHO.com: NR
- USA Today/ US Hockey Magazine: NR

Record
- Overall: 5–11–0
- Conference: 4–11–0–1–5–0
- Home: 4–5–0
- Road: 1–6–0
- Neutral: 0–0–0

Coaches and captains
- Head coach: Ryan Soderquist
- Assistant coaches: Jon Coleman; Stephen Needham; Clay Adams

The 2020–21 Bentley Falcons men's ice hockey season was the 44th season of play for the program, the 22nd at the Division I level, and the 18th season in the Atlantic Hockey conference. The Falcons represented Bentley University and were coached by Ryan Soderquist, in his 19th season.

== Season ==
As a result of the ongoing COVID-19 pandemic the entire college ice hockey season was delayed. Because the NCAA had previously announced that all winter sports athletes would retain whatever eligibility they possessed through at least the following year, none of Bentley's players would lose a season of play. However, the NCAA also approved a change in its transfer regulations that would allow players to transfer and play immediately rather than having to sit out a season, as the rules previously required.

Bentley didn't play well in the first month of the season, beginning 1–5. After a COVID-19-extended break, the Falcons returned to the ice in late January and won consecutive games. Their good play didn't last, however, and the team followed the mini-resurgence with five straight losses. Despite a poor record, Bentley was the host to start the Atlantic Hockey Tournament. The Falcons played Air Force and won decisively, 7–3. As the team was preparing to take on top seed American International, Bentley University began to see a surge in positive COVID cases. Due the school's protocols, Bentley withdrew from the remainder of the tournament on March 11 and ended their season.

== Departures ==
Player	Position	Nationality	Cause
Connor Brassard	Forward	United States	Graduation
Jonathan Desbiens	Defenseman	Canada	Graduation
Carter Dwyer	Forward	United States	Transferred to Hamilton
Ryner Gorowsky	Forward	United States	Graduation
Jake Kauppila	Forward	United States	Graduation
Sam Kauppila	Forward	United States	Left program
Brett Orr	Forward	United States	Graduation
Aidan Pelino	Goaltender	Canada	Graduation (Signed with RoKi)
Matt Riggleman	Forward	United States	Graduation

== Recruiting ==
Player	Position	Nationality	Age	Notes
Drew Bavaro	Defenseman	United States	20	Sarasota, FL
Matt Clark	Defenseman	United States	21	Jamison, PA
Christian Felton	Defenseman	United States	20	Medina, OH
Nicholas Grabko	Goaltender	United States	20	Channahon, IL
Ethan Harrison	Forward	United States	19	Plano, TX
Cole Kodsi	Forward	United States	20	Boca Raton, FL
Zach Pellegrino	Forward	United States	20	Madison, CT
Devon Tongue	Forward	United States	20	Hampden, MA
A. J. Villella	Defenseman	United States	22	Davie, FL; transfer from Northeastern

== Roster ==
As of October 14, 2020.

No.	Nat.	Player	Class	Pos	Height	Weight	DoB	Hometown	Previous team	NHL rights
2	(United States)	Matt Clark	Freshman	D	6' 1" (1.85 m)	185 lb (84 kg)	1999-05-10	Jamison, Pennsylvania	Topeka Pilots (NAHL)	—
3	(Canada)	Luke Orysiuk	Junior	D	6' 0" (1.83 m)	195 lb (88 kg)	1997-06-19	Edmonton, Alberta	Fairbanks Ice Dogs (NAHL)	—
4	(Canada)	Marcus Walter	Sophomore	D	6' 3" (1.91 m)	195 lb (88 kg)	1999-06-14	St. Albert, Alberta	Alberni Valley Bulldogs (BCHL)	—
5	(United States)	Ethan Roswell	Junior	D	5' 11" (1.8 m)	185 lb (84 kg)	1998-07-30	Paradise Valley, Arizona	Boston Junior Bruins (NCDC)	—
6	(United States)	Brendan Hamblet	Senior	F	5' 11" (1.8 m)	180 lb (82 kg)	1998-11-05	Hopkinton, Massachusetts	Rivers School (USHS–MA)	—
7	(United States)	Ethan Harrison	Freshman	F	6' 0" (1.83 m)	170 lb (77 kg)	2000-10-30	Plano, Texas	Sioux City Musketeers (USHL)	—
9	(United States)	Brendan Walkom	Junior	F	6' 0" (1.83 m)	190 lb (86 kg)	1998-01-28	Pittsburgh, Pennsylvania	Madison Capitols (USHL)	—
10	(United States)	Dylan Pitera	Junior	F	6' 2" (1.88 m)	190 lb (86 kg)	1999-07-04	Culver, Indiana	Culver Academies (Midget AAA)	—
11	(Canada)	Jakov Novak	Junior	F	6' 3" (1.91 m)	215 lb (98 kg)	1998-10-22	Windsor, Ontario	Janesville Jets (NAHL)	OTT, 188th overall 2018
12	(United States)	Matt Gosiewski	Sophomore	F	6' 4" (1.93 m)	210 lb (95 kg)	1998-05-10	Wilton, Connecticut	Wenatchee Wild (BCHL)	—
13	(United States)	Will Garin	Junior	F	5' 11" (1.8 m)	180 lb (82 kg)	1997-10-30	Mound, Minnesota	Brooks Bandits (AJHL)	—
14	(United States)	Matt Lombardozzi	Senior	D	6' 1" (1.85 m)	200 lb (91 kg)	1997-06-27	Leominster, Massachusetts	Carleton Place Canadians (CCHL)	—
15	(Canada)	Luke Santerno	Senior	F	6' 3" (1.91 m)	195 lb (88 kg)	1996-06-24	Smithers, British Columbia	Trail Smoke Eaters (BCHL)	—
17	(United States)	Michael Zuffante	Senior	F	5' 10" (1.78 m)	175 lb (79 kg)	1998-03-17	Bloomingdale, Illinois	Minnesota Wilderness (NAHL)	—
18	(United States)	Devan Tongue	Freshman	F	6' 3" (1.91 m)	205 lb (93 kg)	1999-12-31	Hampden, Massachusetts	Amarillo Bulls (NAHL)	—
19	(United States)	Zach Pellegrino	Freshman	F	5' 9" (1.75 m)	195 lb (88 kg)	1999-11-09	Madison, Connecticut	Boston Junior Bruins (NCDC)	—
20	(United States)	Will Schlagenhauf	Junior	F	5' 9" (1.75 m)	175 lb (79 kg)	1998-10-12	Carmel, Indiana	Muskegon Lumberjacks (USHL)	—
21	(United States)	Cole Kodsi	Freshman	F	6' 2" (1.88 m)	190 lb (86 kg)	2000-06-17	Boca Raton, Florida	Omaha Lancers (USHL)	—
22	(United States)	Drew Bavaro	Freshman	D	6' 3" (1.91 m)	195 lb (88 kg)	2000-06-10	Bradenton, Florida	Wenatchee Wild (NAHL)	—
23	(United States)	Christian Felton	Freshman	D	6' 1" (1.85 m)	195 lb (88 kg)	2000-02-04	Medina, Ohio	Vernon Vipers (BCHL)	—
24	(United States)	Joe Winkelmann	Sophomore	F	5' 11" (1.8 m)	180 lb (82 kg)	2000-05-08	St. Louis, Missouri	Odessa Jackalopes (NAHL)	—
25	(United States)	Hunter Toale	Sophomore	D	6' 1" (1.85 m)	170 lb (77 kg)	1999-11-21	Coral Springs, Florida	Johnstown Tomahawks (NAHL)	—
26	(Canada)	Lucas Vanroboys	Sophomore	F	6' 2" (1.88 m)	175 lb (79 kg)	1999-07-24	Thamesville, Ontario	Prince George Spruce Kings (BCHL)	—
27	(United States)	A. J. Villella	Junior	D	6' 0" (1.83 m)	185 lb (84 kg)	1998-01-26	Davie, Florida	Northeastern (HEA)	—
28	(Canada)	Charlie Marchand	Senior	D	5' 11" (1.8 m)	190 lb (86 kg)	1997-08-08	Calgary, Alberta	Brooks Bandits (AJHL)	—
29	(United States)	Nicholas Grabko	Freshman	G	5' 11" (1.8 m)	180 lb (82 kg)	2000-02-06	Channahon, Illinois	Green Bay Gamblers (USHL)	—
33	(United States)	Jason Grande	Sophomore	G	6' 3" (1.91 m)	185 lb (84 kg)	1999-02-07	West Chester, Pennsylvania	Amarillo Bulls (NAHL)	—
34	(Canada)	Fraser Kirk	Junior	G	6' 2" (1.88 m)	180 lb (82 kg)	1997-10-07	Burlington, Ontario	Newmarket Hurricanes (OJHL)	—

== Standings ==
2020–21 Atlantic Hockey Standings
	Conference record											Overall record					
	GP	W	L	T	OW	OL	SW	PTS	PT%	GF	GA	GP	W	L	T	GF	GA
#15 American International †*	12	11	1	0	1	0	0	32	.889	47	18	19	15	4	0	67	40
Army	15	10	4	1	3	1	1	30	.667	42	33	22	15	6	1	71	48
Robert Morris	15	10	5	0	2	1	0	29	.644	58	48	24	15	9	0	85	69
Canisius	13	8	5	0	1	1	0	24	.615	42	34	17	11	6	0	59	46
RIT	13	7	5	1	0	0	1	23	.590	43	40	20	9	9	2	68	70
Sacred Heart	13	6	6	1	1	2	0	20	.513	35	38	18	6	10	2	43	59
Mercyhurst	16	7	8	1	1	1	1	23	.479	54	50	21	8	12	1	64	67
Bentley	15	4	11	0	1	5	0	16	.356	35	48	16	5	11	0	42	51
Niagara	15	3	9	3	0	2	1	15	.333	39	53	22	7	12	3	57	70
Air Force	13	3	9	1	2	1	0	9	.231	32	49	14	3	10	1	35	56
Holy Cross	12	3	9	0	2	0	0	7	.194	22	38	16	4	12	0	30	52
Championship: March 20, 2021 † indicates conference regular season champion * indicates conference tournament champion (Riley Trophy); Rankings: USCHO.com Top 20 Poll

== Schedule and results ==
Date	Time	Opponent^{#}	Rank^{#}	Site	TV	Decision	Result	Attendance	Record
Regular season
December 1	6:30 PM	vs. Holy Cross		Bentley Arena • Waltham, Massachusetts		Grabko	L 1–2 ^{OT}	0	0–1–0 (0–1–0)
December 4	5:05 PM	vs. Army		Bentley Arena • Waltham, Massachusetts		Grabko	W 4–2	0	1–1–0 (1–1–0)
December 5	6:20 PM	at Army		Tate Rink • West Point, New York		Grabko	L 0–2	100	1–2–0 (1–2–0)
December 9	6:00 PM	at Holy Cross		Hart Center • Worcester, Massachusetts		Grabko	L 3–4 ^{OT}	0	1–3–0 (1–3–0)
December 18	5:05 PM	vs. American International		Bentley Arena • Waltham, Massachusetts		Grabko	L 1–4	0	1–4–0 (1–4–0)
December 19	1:05 PM	at American International		MassMutual Center • Springfield, Massachusetts		Kirk	L 1–3	0	1–5–0 (1–5–0)
January 26	5:05 PM	vs. Holy Cross		Bentley Arena • Waltham, Massachusetts		Grabko	W 5–2	0	2–5–0 (2–5–0)
January 31	5:05 PM	vs. Air Force		Bentley Arena • Waltham, Massachusetts		Grabko	W 6–3	0	3–5–0 (3–5–0)
January 1	3:05 PM	vs. Air Force		Bentley Arena • Waltham, Massachusetts		Kirk	L 3–4 ^{OT}	0	3–6–0 (3–6–0)
February 4	5:05 PM	vs. Sacred Heart		Bentley Arena • Waltham, Massachusetts		Grabko	L 0–4	0	3–7–0 (3–7–0)
February 5	5:05 PM	at Sacred Heart		Webster Bank Arena • Bridgeport, Connecticut		Grabko	L 2–4	0	3–8–0 (3–8–0)
February 12	5:00 PM	vs. Army		Bentley Arena • Waltham, Massachusetts		Grabko	L 2–3 ^{OT}	0	3–9–0 (3–9–0)
February 13	7:05 PM	at Army		Tate Rink • West Point, New York		Kirk	L 1–5	100	3–10–0 (3–10–0)
February 16	5:05 PM	at Sacred Heart		Webster Bank Arena • Bridgeport, Connecticut		Grabko	W 5–4 ^{OT}	0	4–10–0 (4–10–0)
February 20	7:05 PM	at Army		Tate Rink • West Point, New York		Grande	L 1–2 ^{OT}	100	4–11–0 (4–11–0)
Atlantic Hockey Tournament
March 9	3:05 PM	vs. Air Force*		Bentley Arena • Waltham, Massachusetts (First Round)		Grabko	W 7–3	0	5–11–0
Withdrew from Tournament
*Non-conference game. ^{#}Rankings from USCHO.com Poll. All times are in Eastern Time.

== Scoring statistics ==
Name	Position	Games	Goals	Assists	Points	PIM
Jakov Novak	LW/C	15	7	10	17	36
Luke Santerno	F	15	5	11	16	34
Matt Gosiewski	C	16	7	8	15	2
Drew Bavaro	D	16	2	10	12	8
Michael Zuffante	F	15	3	7	10	8
Brendan Hamblet	F	15	6	3	9	6
Brendan Walkom	F	13	4	5	9	0
Luke Orysiuk	D	16	1	6	7	12
A. J. Villella	D	15	0	5	5	0
Dylan Pitera	F	16	2	1	3	6
Joe Winkelmann	C	4	1	1	2	0
Matt Clark	D	6	1	1	2	6
Charlie Marchand	D	12	1	1	2	21
Cole Kodsi	LW	16	1	1	2	4
Will Schlagenhauf	F	11	0	2	2	10
Will Garin	RW	9	1	0	1	6
Ethan Roswell	D	11	0	1	1	4
Marcus Walter	D	11	0	1	1	0
Matt Lombardozzi	D	12	0	1	1	23
Lucas Vanroboys	F	13	0	1	1	37
Ethan Harrison	F	16	0	1	1	6
Hunter Toale	D	2	0	0	0	4
Jason Grande	G	2	0	0	0	0
Fraser Kirk	G	4	0	0	0	0
Zach Pellegrino	F	7	0	0	0	17
Devan Tongue	D	8	0	0	0	2
Nicholas Grabko	G	12	0	0	0	0
Christian Felton	D	13	0	0	0	10
Bench	–	–	–	–	–	4
Total			42	77	119	266

== Goaltending statistics ==
Name	Games	Minutes	Wins	Losses	Ties	Goals against	Saves	Shut outs	SV %	GAA
Jason Grande	2	81	0	1	0	3	48	0	.941	2.21
Nicholas Grabko	12	694	5	7	0	33	279	0	.894	2.85
Fraser Kirk	4	191	0	3	0	10	94	0	.904	3.14
Empty Net	-	5	-	-	-	5	-	-	-	-
Total	16	971	5	11	0	51	421	0	.892	3.15

== Rankings ==
Poll	Week																					
Poll	Pre	1	2	3	4	5	6	7	8	9	10	11	12	13	14	15	16	17	18	19	20	21 (Final)
USCHO.com	NR	NR	NR	NR	NR	NR	NR	NR	NR	NR	NR	NR	NR	NR	NR	NR	NR	NR	NR	NR	-	NR
USA Today	NR	NR	NR	NR	NR	NR	NR	NR	NR	NR	NR	NR	NR	NR	NR	NR	NR	NR	NR	NR	NR	NR

USCHO did not release a poll in week 20.

== Awards and honors ==
Player	Award	Ref
Jakov Novak	Atlantic Hockey Regular Season Scoring Trophy	
Nick Grabko	Atlantic Hockey Rookie Team	
Drew Bavaro	Atlantic Hockey Rookie Team	
