= 2020–21 RIT Tigers men's ice hockey season =

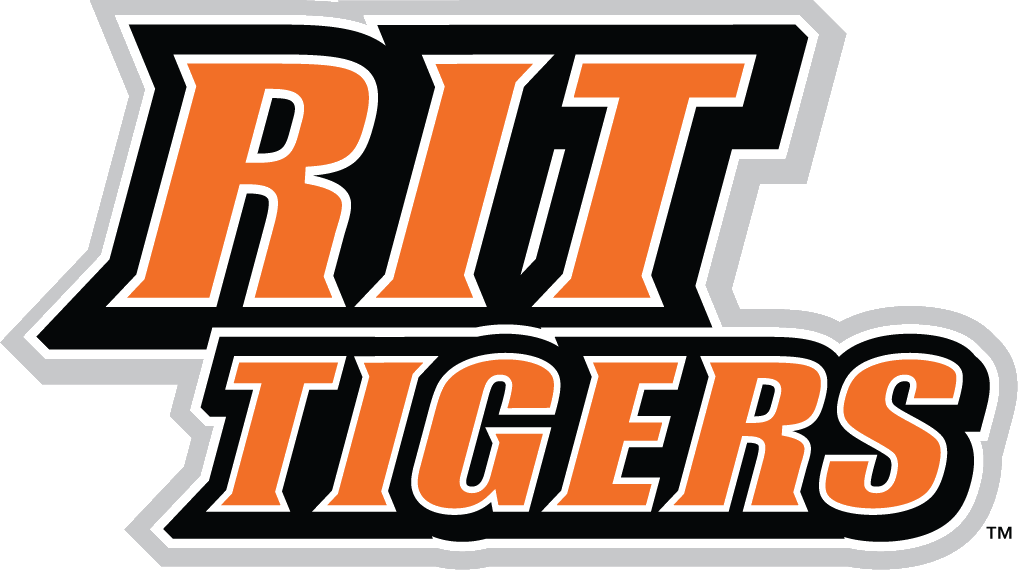
- Conference: 5th Atlantic Hockey
- Home ice: Gene Polisseni Center

Rankings
- USCHO.com: NR
- USA Today/ US Hockey Magazine: NR

Record
- Overall: 9–9–2
- Conference: 7–5–1–0–0–1
- Home: 7–1–1
- Road: 2–8–1
- Neutral: 0–0–0

Coaches and captains
- Head coach: Wayne Wilson
- Assistant coaches: Brian Hills; David Insalaco; Len Perno
- Captain: Alden Dupuis
- Alternate captain(s): Will Calverley; Dan Willett

The 2020–21 RIT Tigers men's ice hockey season was the 57th season of play for the program, the 16th at the Division I level, and the 15th season in the Atlantic Hockey conference. The Tigers represented the Rochester Institute of Technology and were coached by Wayne Wilson, in his 22nd season.

== Season ==
As a result of the ongoing COVID-19 pandemic the entire college ice hockey season was delayed. Because the NCAA had previously announced that all winter sports athletes would retain whatever eligibility they possessed through at least the following year, none of RIT's players would lose a season of play. However, the NCAA also approved a change in its transfer regulations that would allow players to transfer and play immediately rather than having to sit out a season, as the rules previously required.

Throughout the entire season, RIT was a Jekyll and Hyde team, playing far better at home than they did on the road. Despite having no home fans for the entire season, as a result of COVID protocols, RIT won 7 of their 9 home games, including a sweep of then-ranked Robert Morris. Once the team hit the road the offense quieted down and the defense turned into a sieve. Their only two road wins came early in the season, both against a lowly Niagara team, and the resulting imbalance in play caused the Tigers to hover around the .500 mark for most of the season. RIT finished 5th in the conference and caused the team to travel for their quarterfinal meeting with Canisius. The result was nearly predictable and the Tigers were outscored 4–11 in the two games, ending their abbreviated season.

Daniel Chenard sat out the season.

== Departures ==
Player	Position	Nationality	Cause
Darren Brady	Defenseman	United States	Graduation (Signed with Macon Mayhem)
Adam Brubacher	Defenseman	Canada	Graduation (Signed with Bridgeport Sound Tigers)
Shawn Cameron	Forward	Canada	Graduation (Signed with Greenville Swamp Rabbits)
Ryan Kruper	Forward	Canada	Graduation
Thomas Maia	Forward	Canada	Returned to juniors (Nanaimo Clippers)
Chris McKay	Defenseman	Canada	Graduation (Signed with Pensacola Ice Flyers)
Jordan Peacock	Forward	Canada	Graduation
Zach Salloum	Defenseman	Canada	Left program
Brody Valette	Defenseman	Canada	Graduation

== Recruiting ==
Player	Position	Nationality	Age	Notes
Calvon Boots	Defenseman	United States	22	Fairbanks, AK; transfer from American International
Daniel Chenard	Goaltender	Canada	20	Waterloo, ON
Diarmad DiMurro	Defenseman	United States	21	Highland Mills, NY
Aiden Hansen-Bukata	Defenseman	Canada	21	Delta, BC
Cody Laskosky	Forward	Canada	21	New Norway, AB
Dimitri Mikrogiannakis	Defenseman	Canada	21	Aurora, ON

== Roster ==
As of September 15, 2020.

No.	Nat.	Player	Class	Pos	Height	Weight	DoB	Hometown	Previous team	NHL rights
1	(Canada)	Ian Andriano	Senior	G	6' 1" (1.85 m)	198 lb (90 kg)	1996-08-11	Barrie, Ontario	Ottawa Jr. Senators (CCHL)	—
2	(United States)	Diarmad DiMurro	Freshman	D	5' 8" (1.73 m)	175 lb (79 kg)	1999-05-02	Highland Mills, New York	Trail Smoke Eaters (BCHL)	—
3	(Canada)	Spencer Berry	Junior	D	6' 1" (1.85 m)	178 lb (81 kg)	1998-09-26	White Rock, British Columbia	Langley Rivermen (BCHL)	—
4	(Canada)	Dimitri Mikrogiannakis	Freshman	D	5' 11" (1.8 m)	186 lb (84 kg)	1999-09-20	Aurora, Ontario	Cowichan Valley Capitals (BCHL)	—
5	(United States)	Dan Willett (A)	Senior	D	5' 6" (1.68 m)	180 lb (82 kg)	1996-02-23	Bayville, New York	Bloomington Thunder (USHL)	—
6	(United States)	Calvon Boots	Sophomore	D	5' 10" (1.78 m)	193 lb (88 kg)	1998-02-11	Fairbanks, Alaska	American International (AHA)	—
7	(Canada)	Ryan Nicholson	Sophomore	D	6' 2" (1.88 m)	196 lb (89 kg)	1999-01-13	Mississauga, Ontario	Oakville Blades (OJHL)	—
8	(Canada)	Will Calverley (A)	Junior	F	5' 9" (1.75 m)	176 lb (80 kg)	1998-07-17	Scarborough, Ontario	Chilliwack Chiefs (BCHL)	—
9	(Canada)	Jake Joffe	Junior	F	5' 10" (1.78 m)	175 lb (79 kg)	1998-04-30	Toronto, Ontario	Toronto Jr. Canadiens (OJHL)	—
11	(Canada)	Colton Trumbla	Sophomore	F	6' 1" (1.85 m)	202 lb (92 kg)	1998-11-30	Winnipeg, Manitoba	St. Michael's Buzzers (OJHL)	—
14	(United States)	Jake Hamacher	Senior	F	5' 8" (1.73 m)	183 lb (83 kg)	1997-04-20	Corona, California	Dubuque Fighting Saints (USHL)	—
15	(Canada)	Andrew Rinaldi	Sophomore	F	6' 0" (1.83 m)	194 lb (88 kg)	1998-03-15	Pierrefonds, Quebec	Wellington Dukes (OJHL)	—
16	(Canada)	Elijah Gonsalves	Sophomore	F	5' 9" (1.75 m)	173 lb (78 kg)	2000-03-08	Scarborough, Ontario	Wellington Dukes (OJHL)	—
17	(Canada)	Bryson Traptow	Senior	F	6' 3" (1.91 m)	200 lb (91 kg)	1997-04-17	Calgary, Alberta	Camrose Kodiaks (AJHL)	—
18	(Canada)	Kobe Walker	Junior	F	5' 9" (1.75 m)	173 lb (78 kg)	1998-04-03	Lloydminster, Alberta	Lloydminster Bobcats (AJHL)	—
19	(Canada)	Nick Bruce	Senior	F	6' 0" (1.83 m)	181 lb (82 kg)	1996-09-02	Fall River, Nova Scotia	Johnstown Tomahawks (NAHL)	—
20	(United States)	Caleb Moretz	Sophomore	F	5' 10" (1.78 m)	182 lb (83 kg)	1998-07-14	Fairbanks, Alaska	Flin Flon Bombers (SJHL)	—
21	(Canada)	Alden Dupuis (C)	Senior	F	5' 9" (1.75 m)	165 lb (75 kg)	1996-11-06	Edmonton, Alberta	Bonnyville Pontiacs (AJHL)	—
22	(Canada)	Regan Seiferling	Senior	D	6' 2" (1.88 m)	184 lb (83 kg)	1997-03-09	Moose Jaw, Saskatchewan	Yorkton Terriers (SJHL)	—
23	(Canada)	Aiden Hansen-Bukata	Freshman	D	6' 0" (1.83 m)	179 lb (81 kg)	1999-06-29	Delta, British Columbia	Nanaimo Clippers (BCHL)	—
26	(Canada)	Cody Laskosky	Freshman	F	5' 11" (1.8 m)	175 lb (79 kg)	1999-06-21	New Norway, Alberta	Camrose Kodiaks (AJHL)	—
27	(Canada)	Andrew Petrucci	Junior	F	6' 1" (1.85 m)	201 lb (91 kg)	1997-05-21	Toronto, Ontario	Toronto Patriots (OJHL)	—
28	(Canada)	Merritt Oszytko	Junior	F	6' 2" (1.88 m)	182 lb (83 kg)	1998-02-21	Edmonton, Alberta	Fort McMurray Oil Barons (AJHL)	—
30	(Canada)	Logan Drackett	Senior	G	6' 0" (1.83 m)	184 lb (83 kg)	1998-10-01	Calgary, Alberta	Calgary Canucks (AJHL)	—
32	(Canada)	Daniel Chenard	Freshman	G	5' 11" (1.8 m)	173 lb (78 kg)	1999-10-03	Waterloo, Ontario	Wenatchee Wild (BCHL)	—
40	(Canada)	Kolby Matthews	Sophomore	G	6' 0" (1.83 m)	170 lb (77 kg)	1999-03-04	Coquitlam, British Columbia	Coquitlam Express (BCHL)	—

== Standings ==
2020–21 Atlantic Hockey Standings
	Conference record											Overall record					
	GP	W	L	T	OW	OL	SW	PTS	PT%	GF	GA	GP	W	L	T	GF	GA
#15 American International †*	12	11	1	0	1	0	0	32	.889	47	18	19	15	4	0	67	40
Army	15	10	4	1	3	1	1	30	.667	42	33	22	15	6	1	71	48
Robert Morris	15	10	5	0	2	1	0	29	.644	58	48	24	15	9	0	85	69
Canisius	13	8	5	0	1	1	0	24	.615	42	34	17	11	6	0	59	46
RIT	13	7	5	1	0	0	1	23	.590	43	40	20	9	9	2	68	70
Sacred Heart	13	6	6	1	1	2	0	20	.513	35	38	18	6	10	2	43	59
Mercyhurst	16	7	8	1	1	1	1	23	.479	54	50	21	8	12	1	64	67
Bentley	15	4	11	0	1	5	0	16	.356	35	48	16	5	11	0	42	51
Niagara	15	3	9	3	0	2	1	15	.333	39	53	22	7	12	3	57	70
Air Force	13	3	9	1	2	1	0	9	.231	32	49	14	3	10	1	35	56
Holy Cross	12	3	9	0	2	0	0	7	.194	22	38	16	4	12	0	30	52
Championship: March 20, 2021 † indicates conference regular season champion * indicates conference tournament champion (Riley Trophy); Rankings: USCHO.com Top 20 Poll

== Schedule and results ==
Date	Time	Opponent^{#}	Rank^{#}	Site	TV	Decision	Result	Attendance	Record
Regular season
November 27	5:00 PM	vs. #9 Clarkson*		Gene Polisseni Center • Henrietta, New York		Drackett	W 8–5	0	1–0–0
November 29	5:00 PM	at #9 Clarkson*		Cheel Arena • Potsdam, New York		Andriano	L 1–5	0	1–1–0
December 5	5:05 PM	vs. Niagara		Gene Polisseni Center • Henrietta, New York		Drackett	T 3–3 ^{SOW}	0	1–1–1 (0–0–1)
December 6	5:05 PM	at Niagara		Dwyer Arena • Lewiston, New York		Drackett	W 5–1	0	2–1–1 (1–0–1)
December 11	5:00 PM	vs. Long Island*		Gene Polisseni Center • Henrietta, New York		Drackett	L 3–4	0	2–2–1
December 12	5:00 PM	vs. Long Island*		Gene Polisseni Center • Henrietta, New York		Andriano	W 5–1	0	3–2–1
December 22	3:00 PM	at Niagara		Dwyer Arena • Lewiston, New York		Drackett	W 5–4	0	4–2–1 (2–0–1)
December 29	4:00 PM	at Colgate		Class of 1965 Arena • Hamilton, New York		Drackett	T 4–4 ^{OT}	0	4–2–2
January 2	7:30 PM	at Robert Morris		Clearview Arena • Neville Township, Pennsylvania		Drackett	L 1–3	0	4–3–2 (2–1–1)
January 3	4:00 PM	at Robert Morris		Clearview Arena • Neville Township, Pennsylvania		Drackett	L 3–4	0	4–4–2 (2–2–1)
January 28	5:00 PM	vs. Mercyhurst		Gene Polisseni Center • Henrietta, New York		Drackett	W 6–4	0	5–4–2 (3–2–1)
January 30	5:00 PM	vs. Canisius		Gene Polisseni Center • Henrietta, New York		Drackett	W 3–2	0	6–4–2 (4–2–1)
February 5	5:00 PM	vs. Mercyhurst		Gene Polisseni Center • Henrietta, New York		Matthews	W 2–1	0	7–4–2 (5–2–1)
February 6	5:05 PM	at Mercyhurst		Mercyhurst Ice Center • Erie, Pennsylvania		Drackett	L 2–6	0	7–5–2 (5–3–1)
February 12	7:05 PM	at Canisius		LECOM Harborcenter • Buffalo, New York		Matthews	L 3–5	0	7–6–2 (5–4–1)
February 13	7:05 PM	at Canisius		LECOM Harborcenter • Buffalo, New York		Andriano	L 0–3	0	7–7–2 (5–5–1)
February 20	7:05 PM	vs. #19 Robert Morris		Gene Polisseni Center • Henrietta, New York		Andriano	W 6–1	0	8–7–2 (6–5–1)
February 21	5:00 PM	vs. #19 Robert Morris		Gene Polisseni Center • Henrietta, New York		Andriano	W 4–3	0	9–7–2 (7–5–1)
Atlantic Hockey Tournament
March 12	7:05 PM	at Canisius*		LECOM Harborcenter • Buffalo, New York (Atlantic Hockey Quarterfinals game 1)		Andriano	L 2–5	89	9–8–2
March 13	7:05 PM	at Canisius*		LECOM Harborcenter • Buffalo, New York (Atlantic Hockey Quarterfinals game 2)		Drackett	L 2–6	109	9–9–2
RIT Lost Series 0–2
*Non-conference game. ^{#}Rankings from USCHO.com Poll. All times are in Eastern Time.

== Scoring Statistics ==
Name	Position	Games	Goals	Assists	Points	PIM
Will Calverley	C	18	12	13	25	25
Elijah Gonsalves	C/RW	20	9	13	22	22
Jake Hamacher	LW	20	7	14	21	4
Dan Willett	D	20	4	14	18	8
Nick Bruce	F	18	4	12	16	14
Kobe Walker	F	17	6	8	14	4
Alden Dupuis	F	19	6	6	12	2
Caleb Moretz	C/RW	15	6	4	10	8
Jake Joffe	RW	20	5	4	9	0
Regan Seiferling	D	16	1	5	6	12
Spencer Berry	D	18	0	5	5	15
Bryson Traptow	F	20	0	5	5	28
Cody Laskosky	F	18	2	2	4	8
Andrew Petrucci	C	19	3	0	3	10
Ryan Nicholson	D	12	2	1	3	6
Diarmad DiMurro	D	19	1	2	3	4
Dimitri Mikrogiannakis	D	18	0	3	3	8
Aiden Hansen-Bukata	D	20	0	2	2	2
Calvon Boots	D	14	0	1	1	4
Kolby Matthews	G	2	0	0	0	0
Ian Andriano	G	6	0	0	0	0
Colton Trumbla	LW	7	0	0	0	0
Andrew Rinaldi	LW	11	0	0	0	6
Logan Drackett	G	13	0	0	0	0
Merritt Oszytko	F	13	0	0	0	2
Bench	-	-	-	-	-	2
Total			68	114	182	173

== Goaltending statistics ==
Name	Games	Minutes	Wins	Losses	Ties	Goals against	Saves	Shut outs	SV %	GAA
Ian Andriano	6	328	3	3	0	16	160	0	.909	2.92
Kolby Matthews	2	119	1	1	0	6	61	0	.910	3.01
Logan Drackett	13	748	5	5	2	43	286	0	.869	3.45
Empty Net	-	13	-	-	-	5	-	-	-	-
Total	20	1210	9	9	2	70	577	0	.879	3.47

== Rankings ==
Poll	Week																					
Poll	Pre	1	2	3	4	5	6	7	8	9	10	11	12	13	14	15	16	17	18	19	20	21 (Final)
USCHO.com	NR	NR	NR	NR	NR	NR	NR	NR	NR	NR	NR	NR	NR	NR	NR	NR	NR	NR	NR	NR	-	NR
USA Today	NR	NR	NR	NR	NR	NR	NR	NR	NR	NR	NR	NR	NR	NR	NR	NR	NR	NR	NR	NR	NR	NR

USCHO did not release a poll in week 20.

== Awards and honors ==
Player	Award	Ref
Will Calverley	AHCA East Second Team All-American	
Will Calverley	Atlantic Hockey Player of the Year	
Will Calverley	Atlantic Hockey Best Defensive Forward	
Will Calverley	Atlantic Hockey Regular Season Scoring Trophy	
Dan Willett	Atlantic Hockey First Team	
Will Calverley	Atlantic Hockey First Team	
