= 2020–21 Air Force Falcons men's ice hockey season =

- Conference: Atlantic Hockey
- Home ice: Cadet Ice Arena

Rankings
- USCHO.com: NR
- USA Today: NR

Record
- Overall: 3–10–1
- Conference: 3–10–1–2–1–0
- Home: 2–2–0
- Road: 1–7–1
- Neutral: 0–1–0

Coaches and captains
- Head coach: Frank Serratore
- Assistant coaches: Andy Berg; Joe Doyle
- Captain(s): Jake Levin; Zack Mirageas
- Alternate captain(s): Shawn Knowlton; Alex Mehnert

The 2020–21 Air Force Falcons men's ice hockey season was the 53rd season of play for the program and the 15th season in the Atlantic Hockey conference. The Falcons represented the United States Air Force Academy and were coached by Frank Serratore, in his 24th season.

The start of the college hockey season was delayed due to the ongoing coronavirus pandemic. As a result, Air Force's first scheduled game was in late-November as opposed to early-October, which was the norm.

== Season ==
As a result of the ongoing COVID-19 pandemic the entire college ice hockey season was delayed. Because the NCAA had previously announced that all winter sports athletes would retain whatever eligibility they possessed through at least the following year, none of Air Force's players would lose a season of play. However, the NCAA also approved a change in its transfer regulations that would allow players to transfer and play immediately rather than having to sit out a season, as the rules previously required.

Air Force was consistently ranked as one of the worst teams for most of the season. The Falcon's went winless in their first 10 matches and their offense was particularly weak, averaging less than 2 goals per game in those matches. Near the end of the season Air Force's offense finally was able to cobble together a collection of goals that gave the team a three-game winning streak. They entered the Atlantic Hockey Tournament hoping to continue their run, unfortunately, Bentley ended the Falcons' year with a 3–7 loss.

Luke Rowe sat out the season.

== Departures ==
Player	Position	Nationality	Cause
Kieran Durgan	Forward	United States	Left program
Carter Ekberg	Defenseman	United States	Transferred to Long Island
Erich Jaeger	Forward	United States	Graduation
Keegan Mantaro	Forward	United States	Left program
Luke Manning	Forward	United States	Transferred to St. Thomas
Pierce Pluemer	Forward	United States	Graduation
Matt Pulver	Forward	United States	Graduation
Trevor Stone	Forward	United States	Graduation
Brady Tomlak	Forward	United States	Graduation (Signed with Wheeling Nailers)
Joe Tyran	Defenseman	United States	Graduation
Jensen Zerban	Forward	United States	Left program

== Recruiting ==
Player	Position	Nationality	Age	Notes
Brian Adams	Forward	United States	20	San Ramon, CA
Maiszon Balboa	Goaltender	United States	20	Colorado Springs, CO
Sam Brennan	Defenseman	United States	20	Brighton, MA
Parker Brown	Forward	United States	20	Hanahan, SC
Thomas Daskas	Forward	United States	21	Rochester Hills, MN
Billy Duma	Forward	United States	22	Plymouth, MN; had already completed two years of classes
Will Gavin	Forward	United States	20	Durham, CT
Nate Horn	Forward	United States	21	Elk River, MN
Noah Kim	Defenseman	United States	20	Fullerton, CA
Jacob Marti	Forward	United States	21	Highlands Ranch, CO
Luke Robinson	Defenseman	United States	21	Dublin, CA

== Roster ==
As of August 31, 2020.

No.	Nat.	Player	Class	Pos	Height	Weight	DoB	Hometown	Previous team	NHL rights
2	(United States)	Andrew Kruse	Sophomore	D	6' 0" (1.83 m)	190 lb (86 kg)	1998-12-06	Delano, Minnesota	Minnesota Magicians (NAHL)	—
3	(United States)	Jake Levin (C)	Senior	D	6' 1" (1.85 m)	190 lb (86 kg)	1997-02-03	Mequon, Wisconsin	Odessa (NAHL)	—
4	(United States)	Luke Rowe	Sophomore	D	6' 1" (1.85 m)	200 lb (91 kg)	1998-08-08	Succasunna, New Jersey	Boston Jr. Bruins (NCDC)	—
6	(United States)	Alex Mehnert (A)	Senior	D	5' 10" (1.78 m)	190 lb (86 kg)	1997-06-15	Moorhead, Minnesota	Omaha (USHL)	—
7	(United States)	Brian Adams	Freshman	F	5' 8" (1.73 m)	175 lb (79 kg)	1999-12-07	San Ramon, California	Wenatchee (BCHL)	—
8	(United States)	Marshall Bowery	Senior	F	5' 10" (1.78 m)	175 lb (79 kg)	1996-11-17	Rochester Hills, Michigan	Topeka (NAHL)	—
10	(United States)	Billy Duma	Junior	F	6' 0" (1.83 m)	195 lb (88 kg)	1997-11-17	Wayzata, Minnesota	Amarillo (NAHL)	—
11	(United States)	Max Harper	Senior	F	6' 2" (1.88 m)	195 lb (88 kg)	1996-09-29	Rochester Hills, Michigan	Topeka (NAHL)	—
12	(United States)	Blake Bride	Sophomore	F	5' 11" (1.8 m)	180 lb (82 kg)	1998-04-22	Broomfield, Colorado	Sioux Falls (USHL)	—
13	(United States)	Keenan Lund	Sophomore	F	5' 11" (1.8 m)	185 lb (84 kg)	1998-08-03	Sartell, Minnesota	Minot (NAHL)	—
14	(United States)	Jacob Marti	Freshman	F	5' 11" (1.8 m)	185 lb (84 kg)	1999-06-10	Highlands Ranch, Colorado	Bismarck (NAHL)	—
15	(United States)	Bennett Norlin	Sophomore	F	6' 2" (1.88 m)	200 lb (91 kg)	1998-10-26	Farmington, Minnesota	West Kelowna (BCHL)	—
16	(United States)	Sam Brennan	Freshman	D	6' 0" (1.83 m)	200 lb (91 kg)	2000-01-16	Brighton, Michigan	Lone Star (NAHL)	—
17	(United States)	Parker Brown	Freshman	D	5' 10" (1.78 m)	155 lb (70 kg)	1999-09-08	Hanahan, South Carolina	Fairbanks (NAHL)	—
18	(United States)	Ty Pochipinski	Junior	F	5' 9" (1.75 m)	170 lb (77 kg)	1998-06-05	Colorado Springs, Colorado	Penticton (BCHL)	—
19	(United States)	Luke Manning	Sophomore	F	5' 10" (1.78 m)	190 lb (86 kg)	1999-04-13	Stillwater, Minnesota	Des Moines (USHL)	—
20	(United States)	Brandon Koch	Sophomore	D	6' 0" (1.83 m)	185 lb (84 kg)	1999-01-18	Hastings, Minnesota	Wenatchee (BCHL)	—
23	(United States)	Willie Reim	Sophomore	F	6' 3" (1.91 m)	215 lb (98 kg)	1999-01-11	North Oaks, Minnesota	West Kelowna (BCHL)	—
24	(United States)	Nate Horn	Freshman	F	5' 11" (1.8 m)	160 lb (73 kg)	1999-03-02	Elk River, Minnesota	Minnesota Wilderness (NAHL)	—
26	(United States)	Noah Kim	Freshman	D	5' 10" (1.78 m)	170 lb (77 kg)	2000-05-09	Fullerton, California	Okotoks (AJHL)	—
27	(United States)	Luke Robinson	Freshman	D	6' 3" (1.91 m)	205 lb (93 kg)	2000-02-16	Nashville, Tennessee	Dubuque (USHL)	—
29	(United States)	Shawn Knowlton (A)	Senior	F	5' 8" (1.73 m)	165 lb (75 kg)	1996-08-14	Slingerlands, New York	Aberdeen (NAHL)	—
30	(United States)	Erik Anderson	Senior	G	5' 11" (1.8 m)	180 lb (82 kg)	1996-06-10	Chanhassen, Minnesota	Pikes Peak (RMJHL)	—
31	(United States)	Zach LaRocque	Senior	G	6' 3" (1.91 m)	200 lb (91 kg)	1997-01-26	Arvada, Colorado	Cedar Rapids (USHL)	—
33	(United States)	Alex Schilling	Junior	G	6' 1" (1.85 m)	180 lb (82 kg)	1997-12-23	Medina, Minnesota	Austin (NAHL)	—
34	(United States)	Thomas Daskas	Freshman	F	6' 2" (1.88 m)	205 lb (93 kg)	1999-09-03	Rochester, Michigan	Lone Star (NAHL)	—
37	(United States)	Will Gavin	Freshman	F	5' 10" (1.78 m)	185 lb (84 kg)	1999-10-21	Durham, Connecticut	Northern (NCDC)	—
41	(United States)	Austin Park	Sophomore	G	5' 11" (1.8 m)	170 lb (77 kg)	1998-06-05	Highlands Ranch, Colorado	Wenatchee (BCHL)	—
47	(United States)	Dalton Weigel	Sophomore	D	6' 0" (1.83 m)	195 lb (88 kg)	1999-12-30	Bloomington, Minnesota	Aberdeen (NAHL)	—
51	(United States)	Maiszon Balboa	Freshman	G	6' 2" (1.88 m)	185 lb (84 kg)	2000-04-18	Colorado Springs, Colorado	Shreveport (NAHL)	—
74	(United States)	Zack Mirageas (C)	Senior	D	5' 9" (1.75 m)	180 lb (82 kg)	1997-07-15	Newburyport, Massachusetts	Bloomington (USHL)	—

== Standings ==
2020–21 Atlantic Hockey Standings
	Conference record											Overall record					
	GP	W	L	T	OW	OL	SW	PTS	PT%	GF	GA	GP	W	L	T	GF	GA
#15 American International †*	12	11	1	0	1	0	0	32	.889	47	18	19	15	4	0	67	40
Army	15	10	4	1	3	1	1	30	.667	42	33	22	15	6	1	71	48
Robert Morris	15	10	5	0	2	1	0	29	.644	58	48	24	15	9	0	85	69
Canisius	13	8	5	0	1	1	0	24	.615	42	34	17	11	6	0	59	46
RIT	13	7	5	1	0	0	1	23	.590	43	40	20	9	9	2	68	70
Sacred Heart	13	6	6	1	1	2	0	20	.513	35	38	18	6	10	2	43	59
Mercyhurst	16	7	8	1	1	1	1	23	.479	54	50	21	8	12	1	64	67
Bentley	15	4	11	0	1	5	0	16	.356	35	48	16	5	11	0	42	51
Niagara	15	3	9	3	0	2	1	15	.333	39	53	22	7	12	3	57	70
Air Force	13	3	9	1	2	1	0	9	.231	32	49	14	3	10	1	35	56
Holy Cross	12	3	9	0	2	0	0	7	.194	22	38	16	4	12	0	30	52
Championship: March 20, 2021 † indicates conference regular season champion * indicates conference tournament champion (Riley Trophy); Rankings: USCHO.com Top 20 Poll

== Schedule and results ==
Date	Time	Opponent^{#}	Rank^{#}	Site	TV	Decision	Result	Attendance	Record
Regular season
November 27	1:00 PM	at American International		MassMutual Center • Springfield, Massachusetts		Schilling	L 1–3	0	0–1–0 (0–1–0)
November 28	1:00 PM	at American International		MassMutual Center • Springfield, Massachusetts		Schilling	L 1–2	0	0–2–0 (0–2–0)
December 4	7:05 PM	vs. Robert Morris		Cadet Ice Arena • Colorado Springs, Colorado		Schilling	L 1–4	0	0–3–0 (0–3–0)
December 5	4:05 PM	vs. Robert Morris		Cadet Ice Arena • Colorado Springs, Colorado		Schilling	L 2–4	0	0–4–0 (0–4–0)
December 12	5:05 PM	vs. USNTDP*		Cadet Ice Arena • Colorado Springs, Colorado (Exhibition)		LaRocque	T 4–4 ^{SOL}	0	
December 13	5:05 PM	vs. USNTDP*		Cadet Ice Arena • Colorado Springs, Colorado (Exhibition)		Schilling	L 1–3	0	
January 3	3:00 PM	at Niagara		Dwyer Arena • Lewiston, New York		Schilling	L 2–7	0	0–5–0 (0–5–0)
January 4	3:05 PM	at Niagara		Dwyer Arena • Lewiston, New York		LaRocque	T 1–1 ^{SOL}	0	0–5–1 (0–5–1)
January 4	3:05 PM	vs. Sacred Heart		Dwyer Arena • Lewiston, New York		LaRocque	L 3–4 ^{OT}	0	0–6–1 (0–6–1)
January 8	3:00 PM	at Mercyhurst		Mercyhurst Ice Center • Erie, Pennsylvania		LaRocque	L 2–5	0	0–7–1 (0–7–1)
January 9	1:00 PM	at Mercyhurst		Mercyhurst Ice Center • Erie, Pennsylvania		Schilling	L 3–6	0	0–8–1 (0–8–1)
January 31	3:05 PM	at Bentley		Bentley Arena • Waltham, Massachusetts		Schilling	L 3–6	0	0–9–1 (0–9–1)
February 1	1:05 PM	at Bentley		Bentley Arena • Waltham, Massachusetts		Schilling	W 4–3 ^{OT}	0	1–9–1 (1–9–1)
February 19	7:05 PM	vs. Canisius		Cadet Ice Arena • Colorado Springs, Colorado		Schilling	W 4–3 ^{OT}	100	2–9–1 (2–9–1)
February 20	5:00 PM	vs. Canisius		Cadet Ice Arena • Colorado Springs, Colorado		LaRocque	W 5–1	100	3–9–1 (3–9–1)
Atlantic Hockey Tournament
March 9	3:05 PM	at Bentley*		Bentley Arena • Waltham, Massachusetts (First Round)		LaRocque	L 3–7	0	3–10–1
*Non-conference game. ^{#}Rankings from USCHO.com Poll. All times are in Mountain Time.

== Scoring statistics ==
Name	Position	Games	Goals	Assists	Points	PIM
Willie Reim	F	14	6	6	12	10
Brandon Koch	D	14	3	6	9	6
Will Gavin	F	14	3	5	8	2
Shawn Knowlton	F	10	4	3	7	19
Max Harper	F	14	4	3	7	0
Nate Horn	F	14	3	4	7	2
Thomas Daskas	F	14	3	4	7	12
Jacob Levin	D	12	2	5	7	6
Blake Bride	RW	14	2	3	5	12
Bennett Norlin	F	13	0	5	5	0
Brian Adams	F	12	1	3	4	8
Ty Pochipinski	F	14	2	1	3	6
Luke Robinson	D	14	0	3	3	8
Zack Mirageas	D	13	1	1	2	38
Keenan Lund	F	4	0	2	2	0
Marshall Bowery	F	14	0	2	2	12
Jake Marti	F	11	1	0	1	18
Alex Mehnert	D	14	0	1	1	4
Dalton Weigel	D	14	0	1	1	0
Erik Anderson	G	1	0	0	0	0
Noah Kim	D	2	0	0	0	0
Billy Duma	F	2	0	0	0	2
Andrew Kruse	D	5	0	0	0	0
Zack LaRocque	G	8	0	0	0	0
Alex Schilling	G	10	0	0	0	2
Sam Brennan	D	13	0	0	0	2
Bench	D	14	0	0	0	2
Total			35	58	93	171

== Goaltending statistics ==
Name	Games	Minutes	Wins	Losses	Ties	Goals against	Saves	Shut outs	SV %	GAA
Erik Anderson	1	2:47	0	0	0	0	1	0	1.000	0.00
Zach LaRocque	8	380	1	3	1	18	153	0	.895	2.84
Alex Schilling	10	458	2	7	0	33	183	0	.847	4.32
Empty Net	-	13	-	-	-	5	-	-	-	-
Total	14	855	3	10	1	56	337	0	.858	3.93

== Rankings ==
Poll	Week																					
Poll	Pre	1	2	3	4	5	6	7	8	9	10	11	12	13	14	15	16	17	18	19	20	21 (Final)
USCHO.com	NR	NR	NR	NR	NR	NR	NR	NR	NR	NR	NR	NR	NR	NR	NR	NR	NR	NR	NR	NR	-	NR
USA Today	NR	NR	NR	NR	NR	NR	NR	NR	NR	NR	NR	NR	NR	NR	NR	NR	NR	NR	NR	NR	NR	NR

USCHO did not release a poll in week 20.

== Awards and honors ==
Player	Award	Ref
Zach LaRocque	Atlantic Hockey Second Team	
