= 2009–10 Atlantic Hockey season =

2009–10 Atlantic Hockey Atlantic ice hockey member teams are:

- Air Force Falcons
- American International Yellow Jackets
- Army Black Knights
- Bentley Falcons
- Canisius Golden Griffins
- Connecticut Huskies
- Holy Cross Crusaders
- Mercyhurst Lakers
- Niagara Purple Eagles
- RIT Tigers
- Robert Morris Colonials
- Sacred Heart Pioneers

== 2009-10 standings ==
2009–10 Atlantic Hockey standings
	Conference							Overall					
	GP	W	L	T	PTS	GF	GA	GP	W	L	T	GF	GA
#10 RIT†*	28	22	5	1	45	109	51	41	28	12	1	145	90
Sacred Heart	28	16	9	3	35	99	86	38	21	13	4	131	123
Air Force	28	14	8	6	34	86	70	37	16	15	6	103	96
Mercyhurst	28	15	10	3	33	103	70	38	15	20	3	121	118
Canisius	28	13	11	4	30	97	89	37	17	15	5	125	122
Army	28	10	12	6	26	80	83	36	11	18	7	98	114
Holy Cross	28	10	13	5	25	70	74	37	12	19	6	87	102
Bentley	28	10	15	3	23	78	105	35	12	19	4	94	123
Connecticut	28	6	19	3	15	48	91	37	7	27	3	59	135
American International	28	5	19	4	14	59	110	33	5	24	4	69	131
Championship: RIT † indicates conference regular season champion * indicates conference tournament champion Final rankings: USA Today/USA Hockey Magazine Top 15 Poll

== Awards ==
The awards were presented on March 18, 2010, at the Atlantic Hockey awards banquet at the Radisson Hotel Riverside in Rochester, New York.

== Team awards ==
- RIT Tigers, Regular Season Champions
- Army Black Knights, Team Sportsmanship Award

== Individual awards ==
- Jared DeMichiel, Regular season goaltending, RIT Tigers
- Cory Conacher, Regular season scoring, Canisius Golden Griffins
- Cory Conacher, Player of the Year, Canisius Golden Griffins
- Chris Tanev, Rookie of the Year, RIT Tigers
- C. J. Marottolo, Coach of the Year, Sacred Heart Pioneers
- Dave Jarman, Best Defensive Forward, Sacred Heart Pioneers
- Dan Ringwald, Best Defenseman, RIT Tigers
- Chris Risi, Individual Sportsmanship Award, Mercyhurst Lakers

== All-conference teams ==
=== First team ===
- Cory Conacher, Canisius, Junior Forward
- Nick Johnson, Sacred Heart, Senior Forward
- Jacques Lamoureux, Air Force, Junior Forward
- Tim Kirby, Air Force, Sophomore Defense
- Dan Ringwald, RIT, Senior Defense
- Jared DeMichiel, RIT, Senior Goaltender

=== Second team ===
- Brandon Coccimigilo, Mercyhurst, Junior Forward
- Andrew Favot, RIT, Junior Forward
- Cody Omilusik, Army, Junior Forward
- Marcel Alvarez, Army, Sophomore Defense
- Carl Hudson, Canisius, Senior Defense
- Andrew Volkening, Air Force, Senior Goaltender

=== Third team ===
- Cameron Burt, RIT, Sophomore Forward
- Dave Jarman, Sacred Heart, Senior Forward
- Vincent Scarcella, Canisius, Junior Forward
- Paul Ferraro, Sacred Heart, Senior Defense
- Chris Tanev, RIT Freshman, Defense
- Ryan Zapolski, Mercyhurst, Junior Goaltender

=== Rookie Team ===
- Joe Campanelli, Bentley, Forward
- Eric Delong, Sacred Heart, Forward
- Adam Pleskach, AIC, Forward
- Alex Greke, UConn, Defense
- Chris Tanev, RIT, Defense
- Steven Legatto, Sacred Heart, Goaltender
