= 2009 Atlantic Hockey men's ice hockey tournament =

2009 Atlantic Hockey ice hockey tournament
- Dates: March 7–21, 2009
- Teams: 10
- Finals site: Blue Cross Arena; Rochester, New York
- Champions: Air Force (3rd title)
- Winning coach: Frank Serratore (3rd title)
- MVP: Matt Fairchild (Air Force)
- Atlantic Hockey Ice Hockey Tournaments

The 2009 Atlantic Hockey Tournament was the 6th Atlantic Hockey Tournament played between March 7 and March 21, 2009, at campus locations and at the Blue Cross Arena in Rochester, New York. Air Force won their third consecutive Atlantic Hockey Men's Ice Hockey Tournament and received Atlantic Hockey's automatic bid to the 2009 NCAA Division I Men's Ice Hockey Tournament.

== Format ==
The tournament features four rounds of play. In the first round, the seventh and tenth seeds and eighth and ninth seeds play a single game with the winner advancing to the quarterfinals. There, the first seed and lowest ranked first round winner, the second seed and highest ranked first round winner, the third and sixth seeds, and the fourth and fifth seeds play a best-of-three series, with the winner advancing to the semifinals. In the semifinals, the highest and lowest seeds and second highest and second lowest seeds play a single-game, with the winner advancing to the championship game and the loser advancing to the third place game. The tournament champion received an automatic bid to the 2009 NCAA Men's Division I Ice Hockey Tournament.

=== Regular season standings ===
Note: GP = Games played; W = Wins; L = Losses; T = Ties; PTS = Points; GF = Goals For; GA = Goals Against

2008–09 Atlantic Hockey standings
	Conference							Overall					
	GP	W	L	T	PTS	GF	GA	GP	W	L	T	GF	GA
#14 Air Force†*	28	20	6	2	42	105	61	41	28	11	2	148	86
RIT†	28	20	6	2	42	112	73	38	23	13	2	148	117
Mercyhurst	28	17	8	3	37	117	73	40	22	15	3	155	119
Bentley	28	15	11	2	32	91	76	38	19	17	2	116	116
Canisius	28	12	12	4	28	86	80	37	15	16	6	114	111
Army	28	10	12	6	26	77	91	36	11	19	6	92	125
Holy Cross	28	10	15	3	23	73	87	38	13	20	5	106	130
Sacred Heart	28	9	16	3	21	83	107	38	11	23	4	99	147
Connecticut	28	8	18	2	18	74	107	37	9	26	2	89	142
American International	28	5	22	1	11	53	116	35	5	28	2	58	141
Championship: Air Force † indicates conference regular season co-champion * indicates conference tournament champion Final rankings: USA Today/USA Hockey Magazine Top 15 Poll

== Bracket ==
First round March 7
7	Holy Cross	1*
10	American International	0
8	Sacred Heart	4
9	Connecticut	2

Quarterfinals; March 13–15
1	Air Force	4	1	8
8	Sacred Heart	3	4	1
2	RIT	3	6	9
7	Holy Cross	5	4	5
3	Mercyhurst	6	5	—
6	Army	2	0	—
4	Bentley	6	3	4
5	Canisius	3	7	2

Semifinals; March 20
1	Air Force	3
4	Bentley	0
2	RIT	4
3	Mercyhurst	5*

Championship; March 21
1	Air Force	2
3	Mercyhurst	0

Note: * denotes overtime period(s)

=== First round ===
==== (7) Holy Cross vs. (10) American International ====
March 7	Holy Cross	1 – 0	OT	American International	Hart Center	Recap
No Scoring		First period		No scoring
No scoring		Second period		No scoring
No scoring		Third period		No scoring
Everett Sheen - 08:24		First overtime period		No scoring
Ian Dams ( 30 saves / 30 shots )		Goalie stats		Tom Fenton ( 22 saves / 23 shots )

==== (8) Sacred Heart vs. (9) Connecticut ====
March 7	Sacred Heart	4 – 2	Connecticut	Milford Ice Pavilion	Recap
Dave Jarman - pp - 11:01		First period	No scoring
Patrick Knowlton - 07:59		Second period	11:48 - Justin Hernandez
Dave Jarman - 08:19; Bear Trapp - en - 19:15		Third period	17:09 - Chris Waterstradt
Stefan Drew ( 36 saves / 38 shots )		Goalie stats	Brad McInnis ( 28 saves / 31 shots )

=== Quarterfinals ===
==== (1) Air Force vs. (8) Sacred Heart ====
March 13	Air Force	4 – 3	Sacred Heart	Cadet Ice Arena	Recap
No Scoring		First period	05:49 - Matt Gingera
Jeff Hajner - pp - 01:17; Derrick Burnett - pp - 10:25; Scott Kozlak - sh - 19:58		Second period	No scoring
Jacques Lamoureux - 18:24		Third period	03:55 - pp - Erik Boisvert; 06:28 - pp - Erik Boisvert
Andrew Volkening ( 22 saves / 25 shots )		Goalie stats	Stefan Drew ( 37 saves / 41 shots )

March 14	Air Force	1 – 4	Sacred Heart	Cadet Ice Arena	Recap
No Scoring		First period	03:36 - Bear Trapp; 09:53 - pp - Matt Gingera
Scott Kozlak - sh - 04:01		Second period	10:27 - Eric Giosa
No scoring		Third period	01:16 - pp - Eric Giosa
Andrew Volkening ( 9 saves / 13 shots )		Goalie stats	Stefan Drew ( 42 saves / 43 shots )

March 15	Air Force	8 – 1	Sacred Heart	Cadet Ice Arena	Recap
Greg Flynn - 05:54; Greg Flynn - pp - 08:32; Jacques Lamoureux - pp - 18:45		First period	No scoring
Jacques Lamoureux - 00:45; Brent Olson - 03:32; Brent Olson - 16:46; Jeff Hajner - pp - 18:56		Second period	01:52 - pp - Erik Boisvert
Brent Olson - pp - 07:44		Third period	No scoring
Andrew Volkening ( 14 saves / 15 shots )		Goalie stats	Stefan Drew ( 14 saves / 17 shots ) Olivier St. Onge ( 29 saves / 34 shots )

Air Force won series 2–1

==== (2) RIT vs. (7) Holy Cross ====
March 13	RIT	3 – 5	Holy Cross	Frank Ritter Memorial Ice Arena	Recap
Anton Kharin - 08:53; Matt Crowell - 18:07		First period	No scoring
No scoring		Second period	13:10 - pp - Brodie Sheahan; 15:38 - pp - Brodie Sheahan
Andrew Favot - 11:36		Third period	01:07 - pp - Jay Silvia; 04:58 - JP Martignetti; 19:25 - en - Matt Celin
Louis Menard ( 29 saves / 33 shots )		Goalie stats	Ian Dams ( 34 saves / 37 shots )

March 14	RIT	6 – 4	Holy Cross	Frank Ritter Memorial Ice Arena	Recap
Bobby Raymond - 16:43		First period	No scoring
Chris Haltigin - 01:55; Dan Ringwald - 08:11; Brennan Sarazin - sh - 16:54		Second period	04:27 - JP Martignetti; 10:21 - Jordan Cyr; 18:02 - pp - Brodie Sheahan
Tyler Brenner - pp - 05:08; Cameron Burt - pp - 16:19		Third period	07:48 - sh - Peter Lorinser
Louis Menard ( 28 saves / 32 shots )		Goalie stats	Ian Dams ( 30 saves / 36 shots )

March 15	RIT	9 – 5	Holy Cross	Frank Ritter Memorial Ice Arena	Recap
Brent Alexin - sh - 13:59; Cameron Burt - 19:30		First period	No scoring
Tyler Brenner - 04:40; Tyler Brenner - pp - 10:08; Chris Haltigin - 15:22; Mike Janda - 16:32; Anton Kharin - pp - 18:07		Second period	01:36 - Everett Sheen; 04:57 - Jay Silvia; 10:31 - pp - Jordan Cyr
Stevan Matic - 08:14; Anton Kharin - en - 19:00		Third period	00:35 - Jay Silvia; 07:15 - Ryan Driscoll
Louis Menard ( 38 saves / 43 shots )		Goalie stats	Ian Dams ( 14 saves / 21 shots ) Adam Roy ( 6 saves / 7 shots )

RIT won series 2–1

==== (3) Mercyhurst vs. (6) Army ====
March 13	Mercyhurst	6 – 2	Army	Mercyhurst Ice Center	Recap
Matt Fennell - pp - 13:46; Matt Pierce - 17:01		First period	19:22 - Bryant Skarda
Phil Ginand - pp - 10:04		Second period	No scoring
Dan Bremner - 01:52; Brett Robinson - 02:29; Matt Fennell - pp - 07:01		Third period	04:51 - pp - Owen Meyer
Ryan Zapolski ( 28 saves / 30 shots )		Goalie stats	Jay Clark ( 35 saves / 41 shots )

March 14	Mercyhurst	5 – 0	Army	Mercyhurst Ice Center	Recap
Matt Fennell - 07:50; Cody Collins - 14:00; Phil Ginand - 16:15		First period	No scoring
Matt Pierce - 14:01		Second period	No scoring
Brett Robinson - 08:21		Third period	No scoring
Ryan Zapolski ( 27 saves / 27 shots )		Goalie stats	Jay Clark ( 28 saves / 33 shots )

Mercyhurst won series 2–0

==== (4) Bentley vs. (5) Canisius ====
March 13	Bentley	6 – 3	Canisius	John A. Ryan Arena	Recap
Erik Peterson - 03:34; Dain Prewitt - 08:55		First period	17:57 - Josh Heidinger
Dain Prewitt - pp - 13:47; Anthony Canzoneri - pp - 16:22		Second period	11:32 - sh - Dave Kostuch
Justin Kemmerer - 14:42; Brendan Harrison - en - 19:45		Third period	01:44 - Dave Kostuch
Kyle Rank ( 31 saves / 34 shots )		Goalie stats	Dan Morrison ( 18 saves / 23 shots )

March 14	Bentley	3 – 7	Canisius	John A. Ryan Arena	Recap
Dain Prewitt - 19:38		First period	11:37 - Cory Conacher; 13:26 - Dave Kostuch; 15:50 - pp - Ryan Klusendorf
Dain Prewitt - pp - 18:51		Second period	05:06 - pp - Carl Hudson; 07:44 - Ryan Klusendorf
Dustin Cloutier - pp - 00:30		Third period	07:30 - Jason Weeks; 09:39 - pp - Scott Jenks
Kyle Rank ( 10 saves / 15 shots ) Joe Calvi ( 3 saves / 5 shots )		Goalie stats	Andrew Loewen ( 41 saves / 44 shots )

March 15	Bentley	4 – 2	Canisius	John A. Ryan Arena	Recap
Jeff Gumaer - 00:14; Marc Menzione - 11:16		First period	03:09 - Adam Brace
Jeff Gumaer - 00:09; Jeff Gumaer - pp - 07:51		Second period	No scoring
No scoring		Third period	02:11 - Adam Brace
Kyle Rank ( 29 saves / 31 shots )		Goalie stats	Andrew Loewen ( 16 saves / 20 shots ) Dan Morrison ( 18 saves / 18 shots )

Bentley won series 2–1

=== Semifinals ===
==== (1) Air Force vs. (4) Bentley ====
March 20	Air Force	3 – 0	Bentley	Blue Cross Arena	Recap
No Scoring		First period	No scoring
Matt Fairchild - 10:56; Josh Frider - pp - 18:47		Second period	No scoring
Matt Fairchild - pp - 17:53		Third period	No scoring
Andrew Volkening ( 26 saves / 26 shots )		Goalie stats	Kyle Rank ( 23 saves / 26 shots )

==== (2) RIT vs. (3) Mercyhurst ====
March 20	RIT	4 – 5	OT	Mercyhurst	Blue Cross Arena	Recap
Cameron Burt - pp - 14:00		First period		00:37 - Neil Graham
Al Mazur - pp - 04:56; Anton Kharin - 06:19		Second period		06:57 - pp - Scott Pitt; 17:02 - pp - Brandon Coccimiglio
Cameron Burt - 19:01		Third period		00:31 - pp - Scott Pitt
No scoring		First overtime period		02:19 - Chris Risi
Jared DeMichiel ( 31 saves / 36 shots )		Goalie stats		Ryan Zapolski ( 36 saves / 40 shots )

=== Championship ===
==== (1) Air Force vs. (3) Mercyhurst ====
March 21	Air Force	2 – 0	Mercyhurst	Blue Cross Arena	Recap
Jacques Lamoureux - 03:02		First period	No scoring
Matt Fairchild - 01:11		Second period	No scoring
No scoring		Third period	No scoring
Andrew Volkening ( 25 saves / 25 shots )		Goalie stats	Ryan Zapolski ( 31 saves / 33 shots )

== Tournament awards ==
=== All-Tournament Team ===
- G Andrew Volkening (Air Force)
- D Gregg Flynn (Air Force)
- D Scott Mathis (Air Force)
- F Cameron Burt (RIT)
- F Matt Fairchild* (Air Force)
- F Scott Pitt (Mercyhurst)

* Most Valuable Player(s)
