= 2010 Atlantic Hockey men's ice hockey tournament =

2010 Atlantic Hockey ice hockey tournament
- Dates: March 5–20, 2010
- Teams: 10
- Finals site: Blue Cross Arena; Rochester, New York
- Champions: RIT (1st title)
- Winning coach: Wayne Wilson (1st title)
- MVP: Cameron Burt (RIT)
- Atlantic Hockey Ice Hockey Tournaments

The 2010 Atlantic Hockey Tournament was the 7th Atlantic Hockey Tournament played between March 5 and March 20, 2010 at campus locations and at the Blue Cross Arena in Rochester, New York. By winning the tournament, RIT received Atlantic Hockey's automatic bid to the 2010 NCAA Division I Men's Ice Hockey Tournament.

== Format ==
The tournament featured four rounds of play. In the first round, the seventh and tenth seeds and eighth and ninth seeds played a single game with the winner advancing to the quarterfinals. There, the first seed and lower-ranked first-round winner, the second seed and higher-ranked first-round winner, the third and sixth seeds, and the fourth and fifth seeds played a best-of-three series, with the winner advancing to the semifinals. In the semifinals, the highest and lowest seeds and second-highest and second-lowest seeds played a single game each, with the winners advancing to the championship game. The tournament champion received an automatic bid to the 2010 NCAA Men's Division I Ice Hockey Tournament.

=== Regular season standings ===
Note: GP = Games played; W = Wins; L = Losses; T = Ties; PTS = Points; GF = Goals For; GA = Goals Against

2009–10 Atlantic Hockey standings
	Conference							Overall					
	GP	W	L	T	PTS	GF	GA	GP	W	L	T	GF	GA
#10 RIT†*	28	22	5	1	45	109	51	41	28	12	1	145	90
Sacred Heart	28	16	9	3	35	99	86	38	21	13	4	131	123
Air Force	28	14	8	6	34	86	70	37	16	15	6	103	96
Mercyhurst	28	15	10	3	33	103	70	38	15	20	3	121	118
Canisius	28	13	11	4	30	97	89	37	17	15	5	125	122
Army	28	10	12	6	26	80	83	36	11	18	7	98	114
Holy Cross	28	10	13	5	25	70	74	37	12	19	6	87	102
Bentley	28	10	15	3	23	78	105	35	12	19	4	94	123
Connecticut	28	6	19	3	15	48	91	37	7	27	3	59	135
American International	28	5	19	4	14	59	110	33	5	24	4	69	131
Championship: RIT † indicates conference regular season champion * indicates conference tournament champion Final rankings: USA Today/USA Hockey Magazine Top 15 Poll

== Bracket ==
First round March 5–6
7	Holy Cross	4
10	American International	2
8	Bentley	1
9	Connecticut	2

Quarterfinals; March 12–13
1	RIT	4*	4	—
9	Connecticut	3	1	—
2	Sacred Heart	4	4*	—
7	Holy Cross	0	3	—
3	Air Force	3	4	—
6	Army	0	2	—
4	Mercyhurst	1	4	—
5	Canisius	5	5**	—

Semifinals; March 19
1	RIT	4
5	Canisius	0
2	Sacred Heart	2
3	Air Force	1

Championship; March 20
1	RIT	6
2	Sacred Heart	1

Note: * denotes overtime period(s)

== Results ==
=== First round ===
==== (7) Holy Cross vs. (10) American International ====
March 5	Holy Cross	4 – 2	American International	Hart Center	Recap
No scoring		First period	No scoring
Jordan Cyr - 09:29; J. P. Martignetti - 11:53; Rob Linsmayer - 12:31		Second period	06:48 - Chris Markiewicz; 15:23 - Mike Little
Matt Celin - 13:11		Third period	No scoring
Thomas Tysowsky ( 15 saves / 17 shots )		Goalie stats	Ben Meisner ( 19 saves / 22 shots ) Dan Ramirez ( 8 saves / 9 shots )

==== (8) Bentley vs. (9) Connecticut ====
March 6	Bentley	1 – 2	Connecticut	John A. Ryan Arena	Recap
Dan Koudys - 14:23		First period	03:05 - Andrew Olson; 14:56 - Justin Hernandez
No scoring		Second period	No scoring
No scoring		Third period	No scoring
Kyle Rank ( 18 saves / 20 shots )		Goalie stats	Garrett Bartus ( 27 saves / 28 shots )

=== Quarterfinals ===
==== (1) RIT vs. (9) Connecticut ====
March 12	RIT	4 – 3	OT	Connecticut	Frank Ritter Memorial Ice Arena	Recap
Dan Ringwald - pp - 11:10; Scott Knowles - 11:35		First period		No scoring
Andrew Favot - pp - 07:36		Second period		09:05 - pp - James Gallagher; 16:24 - Evan Carriere; 18:22 - sh - Andrew Olson
No scoring		Third period		No scoring
Chris Haltigin - 09:54		First overtime period		No scoring
Jared DeMichiel ( 15 saves / 18 shots )		Goalie stats		Garrett Bartus ( 51 saves / 55 shots )

March 13	RIT	4 – 1	Connecticut	Frank Ritter Memorial Ice Arena	Recap
Cameron Burt - pp - 03:28; Adam Hartley - 14:27		First period	No scoring
Chris Tanev - 06:35; Chris Haltigin - 10:25		Second period	No scoring
No scoring		Third period	5:21 - pp - Sean Ambrosie
Jared DeMichiel ( 17 saves / 18 shots )		Goalie stats	Garrett Bartus ( 33 saves / 37 shots )

RIT won series 2–0

==== (2) Sacred Heart vs. (7) Holy Cross ====
March 12	Sacred Heart	4 – 0	Holy Cross	Milford Ice Pavilion	Recap
No scoring		First period	No scoring
Nick Johnson - pp - 16:04		Second period	No scoring
Ryan Miniaci - 12:13; Dave Jarman - 16:45; Eric Delong - en - 18:17		Third period	No scoring
Steven Legatto ( 36 saves / 36 shots )		Goalie stats	Thomas Tysowsky ( 32 saves / 35 shots ) Empty net ( 1 shot )

March 13	Sacred Heart	4 – 3	OT	Holy Cross	Milford Ice Pavilion	Recap
Nick Johnson - 03:22; Erik Boisvert - 12:35		First period		No scoring
Dave Jarman - 15:28		Second period		00:21 - Rob Linsmayer; 07:54 - Jordan Cyr; 08:14 - Kyle Atkins
No scoring		Third period		No scoring
Matt Gingera - 04:53		First overtime period		No scoring
Steven Legatto ( 16 saves / 19 shots )		Goalie stats		Thomas Tysowsky ( 24 saves / 28 shots )

Sacred Heart won series 2–0

==== (3) Air Force vs. (6) Army ====
March 12	Air Force	3 – 0	Army	Cadet Ice Arena	Recap
Sean Bertsch - 01:38		First period	No scoring
Bertsch - 16:00; Derrick Burnett - 17:36		Second period	No scoring
No scoring		Third period	No scoring
Andrew Volkening ( 29 saves / 29 shots )		Goalie stats	Jay Clark ( 35 saves / 38 shots )

March 13	Air Force	4 – 2	Army	Cadet Ice Arena	Recap
No scoring		First period	17:55 - Bryant Skarda
Sean Bertsch - 08:46; Brandon Johnson - 17:22		Second period	15:30 - pp - Owen Meyer
Jacques Lamoureaux - pp - 18:35; Derrick Burnett - en - 19:40		Third period	No scoring
Andrew Volkening ( 31 saves / 33 shots )		Goalie stats	Jay Clark ( 30 saves / 33 shots ) Empty net ( 1 shot )

Air Force won series 2–0

==== (4) Mercyhurst vs. (5) Canisius ====
March 12	Mercyhurst	1 – 5	Canisius	Mercyhurst Ice Center	Recap
No scoring		First period	05:10 - Torrey Lindsay; 05:42 - Preston Shupe
No scoring		Second period	06:40 - pp - Josh Heidinger
Scott Pitt - pp - 14:34		Third period	10:18 - pp - Carl Hudson; 16:05 - en - Heidinger
Ryan Zapolski ( 21 saves / 25 shots ) Empty net ( 1 shot )		Goalie stats	Dan Morrison ( 41 saves / 42 shots )

March 13	Mercyhurst	4 – 5	2OT	Canisius	Mercyhurst Ice Center	Recap
No scoring		First period		13:07 - Dave Kostuch
Matt Fennell - pp - 00:47; Grant Blakey - pp - 05:28; Fennell - pp - 05:45; Kevin Noble - pp - 09:30		Second period		12:03 - pp - Dave Cianfrini
No scoring		Third period		14:15 - pp - Preston Shupe; 16:13 - pp - Kostuch
No scoring		Second overtime period		07:00 - Ben Parker
Ryan Zapolski ( 63 saves / 68 shots )		Goalie stats		Dan Morrison ( 44 saves / 48 shots )

Canisius won series 2–0

=== Semifinals ===
==== (1) RIT vs. (5) Canisius ====
March 19	RIT	4 – 0	Canisius	Blue Cross Arena	Recap
Tyler Brenner - pp - 14:52; Mike Janda - 15:44		First period	No scoring
Andrew Favot - pp - 08:41		Second period	No scoring
Al Mazur - pp - 14:01		Third period	No scoring
Jared DeMichiel ( 20 saves / 20 shots )		Goalie stats	Dan Morrison ( 26 saves / 30 shots )

==== (2) Sacred Heart vs. (3) Air Force ====
March 19	Sacred Heart	2 – 1	Air Force	Blue Cross Arena	Recap
No scoring		First period	No scoring
Erik Boisvert - 10:14		Second period	No scoring
Patrick Knowlton - 19:18		Third period	18:31 - ea - Jacques Lamoureaux
Steven Legatto ( 32 saves / 33 shots )		Goalie stats	Andrew Volkening ( 32 saves / 34 shots )

=== Championship ===
==== (1) RIT vs. (2) Sacred Heart ====
March 20	RIT	6 – 1	Sacred Heart	Blue Cross Arena	Recap
Cameron Burt - pp - 02:16; Mark Cornacchia - sh - 19:41		First period	No scoring
Sean Murphy - 01:08; Jeff Smith - 12:04; Tyler Brenner - pp - 19:04		Second period	No scoring
Murphy - 17:56		Third period	03:48 - Eric Delong
Jared DeMichiel ( 32 saves / 33 shots )		Goalie stats	Steven Legatto ( 33 saves / 39 shots )

== Tournament awards ==
=== All-Tournament Team ===
- G Jared DeMichiel (RIT)
- D Dan Ringwald (RIT)
- D Chris Tanev (RIT)
- F Tyler Brenner (RIT)
- F Patrick Knowlton (Sacred Heart)
- F Cameron Burt* (RIT)

* Most Valuable Player(s)
