= 2009–10 RIT Tigers men's ice hockey season =

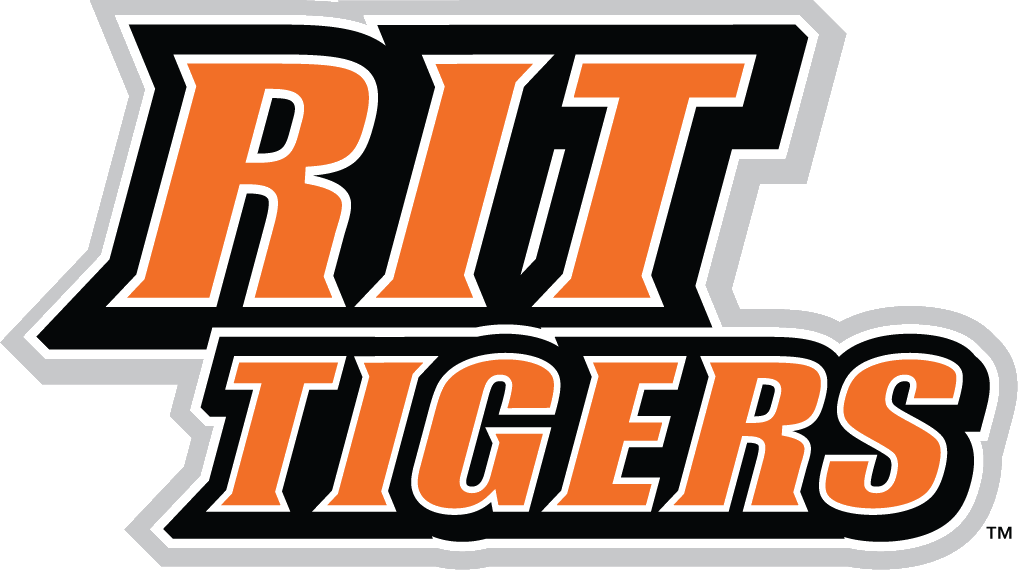

Atlantic Hockey regular season, champion Atlantic Hockey Tournament, champion NCAA tournament, Frozen Four
- Conference: #1 AHA
- Home ice: Frank Ritter Memorial Ice Arena

Rankings
- USA Today/USA Hockey Magazine: #10
- USCHO.com: #20

Record
- Overall: 28–12–1 (22–5–1)
- Home: 15–3–0
- Road: 9–8–1
- Neutral: 4–1–0

Coaches and captains
- Head coach: Wayne Wilson (11th season)
- Assistant coaches: Brian Hills
- Captain(s): Dan Ringwald; Stevan Matic
- Alternate captain(s): Sean Murphy; Andrew Favot

The 2009–10 RIT Tigers men's ice hockey season was the Tigers' 45th season of varsity hockey and fifth at the NCAA Division I level. They represented Rochester Institute of Technology in the 2009–10 NCAA Division I men's ice hockey season. The team was coached by Wayne Wilson in his eleventh season as the program's head coach and played most of their home games at the Frank Ritter Memorial Ice Arena. One home game was played at the Blue Cross Arena in downtown Rochester, New York.

The season was highlighted by the Tigers' first Atlantic Hockey tournament title, first Division I NCAA tournament appearance, victories over Denver and New Hampshire to win the East Regional, and the team's first Frozen Four appearance.

The team was the Chairman's Choice for induction into the Frontier Field Walk of Fame in 2010, in recognition of their Frozen Four berth.

The Rochester Red Wings honored the RIT Men’s Hockey team at Frontier Field on May 17, 2010. Any fans who wore RIT gear received $1 off the purchase of their tickets. As part of a pre-game ceremony, Head Coach Wayne Wilson and RIT President Bill Destler were on hand to accept a key to the city and a proclamation from Monroe County Executive Maggie Brooks. RIT captain Dan Ringwald threw out the ceremonial first pitch.

In 2011, RIT's University News service received the 'Best In Show' PRism award from the Rochester chapter of the Public Relations Society of America for its coverage of the team's Frozen Four appearance.

== Standings ==
2009–10 Atlantic Hockey standings
	Conference							Overall					
	GP	W	L	T	PTS	GF	GA	GP	W	L	T	GF	GA
#10 RIT†*	28	22	5	1	45	109	51	41	28	12	1	145	90
Sacred Heart	28	16	9	3	35	99	86	38	21	13	4	131	123
Air Force	28	14	8	6	34	86	70	37	16	15	6	103	96
Mercyhurst	28	15	10	3	33	103	70	38	15	20	3	121	118
Canisius	28	13	11	4	30	97	89	37	17	15	5	125	122
Army	28	10	12	6	26	80	83	36	11	18	7	98	114
Holy Cross	28	10	13	5	25	70	74	37	12	19	6	87	102
Bentley	28	10	15	3	23	78	105	35	12	19	4	94	123
Connecticut	28	6	19	3	15	48	91	37	7	27	3	59	135
American International	28	5	19	4	14	59	110	33	5	24	4	69	131
Championship: RIT † indicates conference regular season champion * indicates conference tournament champion Final rankings: USA Today/USA Hockey Magazine Top 15 Poll

== Roster ==
Goaltenders
#	State	Player	Year	Major	Height	Weight	Hometown	Previous Team
1	(California)	Shane Madolora	Freshman	Business Management	5-10	170	Salinas, California	Omaha (USHL)
33	(Connecticut)	Jared DeMichiel	Senior	Business	6-1	190	Avon, Connecticut	Chicago (USHL)
40	(Finland)	Jan Ropponen	Junior	International Business	5-9	165	Espoo, Finland	Espoo (SM-liiga)

Defensemen
#	State	Player	Year	Major	Height	Weight	Hometown	Previous Team
6	(Ontario)	Dan Ringwald (C)	Senior	Business	6-1	195	Oakville, Ontario	Oakville (OJAHL)
8	(Ontario)	Chris Tanev	Freshman	Finance	6-2	185	Toronto, Ontario	Markham (CCHL)
15	(British Columbia)	Alan Mazur	Senior	Packaging Science	6-0	200	Burnaby, British Columbia	Merritt (BCHL)
24	(Ontario)	Chris Haltigin	Sophomore	Biomedical Science	6-1	200	Oakville, Ontario	Oakville (OJAHL)
25	(Ontario)	Daniel Spivak	Sophomore	Business/Finance	6-0	185	Thornhill, Ontario	Stouffville (CCHL)
26	(Ontario)	Trevor Eckenswiller	Sophomore	Biomedical Science	6-0	180	Lion's Head, Ontario	Oakville (OJAHL)
27	(Missouri)	Chris Saracino	Freshman	Business	5-10	185	St. Louis, Missouri	Green Bay (USHL)
9*	(Saskatchewan)	Riley Clark*	Sophomore	Biomedicine	5-11	195	Saskatoon, Saskatchewan	Melfort (SJHL)

Forwards
#	State	Player	Year	Major	Height	Weight	Hometown	Previous Team
3	(Ontario)	Scott Knowles	Sophomore	Marketing	5-7	170	Riverside, Ontario	Surrey (BCHL)
7	(Ontario)	Bryan Potts	Freshman	Criminal Justice	5-11	180	Niagara Falls, Ontario	Markham (CCHL)
10	(Ontario)	Mark Cornacchia	Sophomore	Finance	5-10	180	Unionville, Ontario	Markham (CCHL)
11	(Alberta)	Taylor McReynolds	Sophomore	Biomedicine	6-0	190	Sherwood Park, Alberta	Green Bay (USHL)
12	(British Columbia)	Stevan Matic (C)	Senior	Packaging Science	6-0	190	Burnaby, British Columbia	Langley Hornets (BCHL)
14	(New York (state))	Brent Alexin	Senior	Packaging Science	6-1	200	West Seneca, New York	Buffalo (OJAHL)
16	(Ontario)	Tyler Brenner	Sophomore	Business	6-2	190	Linwood, Ontario	Elmira (GOJHL)
17	(Minnesota)	Sean Murphy (A)	Junior	Civil Engineering Technology	6-0	190	Owatonna, Minnesota	Green Bay (USHL)
18	(Michigan)	Cameron Burt	Sophomore	Business	5-10	160	Detroit, Michigan	Green Bay (USHL)
19	(British Columbia)	Tyler Mazzei	Junior	Business	5-9	170	Kelowna, British Columbia	Nanaimo (BCHL)
21	(Washington (state))	Jeff Smith	Freshman	Science Exploration	6-0	165	Spokane, Washington	Tri-City (USHL)
22	(British Columbia)	Adam Hartley	Freshman	Business	6-3	190	West Vancouver, British Columbia	Surrey (BCHL)
23	(Illinois)	Mike Janda	Junior	Marketing	6-2	225	Glen Ellyn, Illinois	Chicago (USHL)
28	(Ontario)	Andrew Favot (A)	Junior	Business (Marketing)	5-7	160	King City, Ontario	Aurora (OJAHL)

* Player left team.
Source: RIT Athletics

== Preseason ==
2009 Exhibition Game Log: 1–0–0 (Home: 1–0–0; Road: 0–0–0)
#	Date	Opponent	Score	OT	Decision	Attendance	Record
1	October 4	York	3–2		Ropponen		1–0–0

== Regular season ==
=== Schedule ===
- Green background indicates win (2 points).
- Red background indicates loss (0 points).
- White background indicates tie (1 point).

2009–10 Game Log

October: 2–5–0 (Home: 2–1–0; Road: 0–4–0)
#	Date	Visitor	Score	Home	Decision	Attendance	AHA	Overall
1†^	October 10	Colgate	3–2	RIT	DeMichiel	7,421	0–0–0	0–1–0
2†	October 16	RIT	1–3	St. Lawrence	DeMichiel	1,655	0–0–0	0–2–0
3†	October 17	RIT	3–5	Clarkson	DeMichiel	3,310	0–0–0	0–3–0
4	October 23	RIT	4–5	Air Force	DeMichiel	2,822	0–1–0	0–4–0
5	October 24	RIT	2–3 (ot)	Air Force	DeMichiel	2,210	0–2–0	0–5–0
6	October 30	Connecticut	2–6	RIT	DeMichiel	1,839	1–2–0	1–5–0
7	October 31	Connecticut	0–7	RIT	DeMichiel	1,457	2–2–0	2–5–0

November: 6–0–0 (Home: 4–0–0; Road: 2–0–0)
#	Date	Visitor	Score	Home	Decision	Attendance	AHA	Overall
8	November 6	Army	1–6	RIT	DeMichiel	2,100	3–2–0	3–5–0
9	November 7	Army	1–2	RIT	DeMichiel	1,956	4–2–0	4–5–0
10	November 13	RIT	2–1	Mercyhurst	DeMichiel	967	5–2–0	5–5–0
11	November 13	RIT	3–2	Mercyhurst	DeMichiel	946	6–2–0	6–5–0
12	November 20	Sacred Heart	2–3	RIT	DeMichiel	1,459	7–2–0	7–5–0
13	November 21	Sacred Heart	3–5	RIT	Madolora	1,206	8–2–0	8–5–0

December: 1–1–1 (Home: 0–1–0; Road: 1–0–1)
#	Date	Visitor	Score	Home	Decision	Attendance	AHA	Overall
14	December 4	RIT	1–1 (ot)	Holy Cross	DeMichiel	908	8–2–1	8–5–1
15	December 5	RIT	3–2	Holy Cross	DeMichiel	923	9–2–1	9–5–1
16†	December 12	Niagara	3–2	RIT	DeMichiel	2,100	9–2–1	9–6–1

January: 6–4–0 (Home: 3–1–0; Road: 3–3–0)
#	Date	Visitor	Score	Home	Decision	Attendance	AHA	Overall
17†	January 1	RIT	1–6	Minnesota State	DeMichiel	3,106	9–2–1	9–7–1
18†	January 2	RIT	0–3	Minnesota State	Madolora	3,313	9–2–1	9–8–1
19	January 8	Holy Cross	2–5	RIT	DeMichiel	1,946	10–2–1	10–8–1
20	January 9	Holy Cross	0–2	RIT	DeMichiel	1,737	11–2–1	11–8–1
21	January 15	RIT	4–0	Connecticut	DeMichiel	581	12–2–1	12–8–1
22	January 16	RIT	1–2	Connecticut	Madolora	735	12–3–1	12–9–1
23	January 22	RIT	4–3	American Int'l	DeMichiel	234	13–3–1	13–9–1
24	January 23	RIT	4–0	American Int'l	DeMichiel	210	14–3–1	14–9–1
25	January 29	Bentley	1–4	RIT	DeMichiel	1,692	15–3–1	15–9–1
26°	January 30	Bentley	5–4	RIT	DeMichiel	2,100	15–4–1	15–10–1

February: 7–1–0 (Home: 4–0–0; Road: 3–1–0)
#	Date	Visitor	Score	Home	Decision	Attendance	AHA	Overall
27	February 5	RIT	5–2	Sacred Heart	DeMichiel	657	16–4–1	16–10–1
28	February 6	RIT	4–5	Sacred Heart	DeMichiel	438	16–5–1	16–11–1
29	February 12	RIT	3–0	Army	DeMichiel	2,139	17–5–1	17–11–1
30	February 13	RIT	5–2	Army	DeMichiel	2,128	18–5–1	18–11–1
31	February 19	Air Force	2–3 (ot)	RIT	DeMichiel	2,100	19–5–1	19–11–1
32	February 20	Air Force	0–3	RIT	DeMichiel	2,100	20–5–1	20–11–1
33	February 26	Canisius	0–8	RIT	DeMichiel	1,363	21–5–1	21–11–1
34	February 27	Canisius	4–5	RIT	DeMichiel	1,632	22–5–1	22–11–1

† Denotes a non-conference game

^ Denotes alternate home site: Blue Cross Arena (Rochester, New York)

° Denotes "Make the Rink Pink" game

== Postseason ==
2010 Playoff Game Log

March: 6–0–0 (Home: 2–0–0; Road: 0–0–0; Neutral: 4–0–0)
#	Date	Visitor	Score	Home	Decision	Attendance	AHA	Overall
35°	March 12	Connecticut	3–4 (ot)	RIT	DeMichiel	1,415	22–5–1	23–11–1
36°	March 13	Connecticut	1–4	RIT	DeMichiel	1,659	22–5–1	24–11–1
37^	March 19	Canisius	0–4	RIT	DeMichiel	1,803	22–5–1	25–11–1
38†	March 20	Sacred Heart	1–6	RIT	DeMichiel	3,298	22–5–1	26–11–1
39§	March 26	RIT	2–1	Denver	DeMichiel	4,073	22–5–1	27–11–1
40%	March 27	RIT	6–2	New Hampshire	DeMichiel	3,737	22–5–1	28–11–1

April: 0–1–0 (Home: 0–0–0; Road: 0–0–0; Neutral: 0–1–0)
#	Date	Visitor	Score	Home	Decision	Attendance	AHA	Overall
41¤	April 8	RIT	1–8	Wisconsin	DeMichiel	34,954	22–5–1	28–12–1

° Denotes Atlantic Hockey Tournament quarterfinal game (non-conference)

^ Denotes Atlantic Hockey Tournament semifinal game at Blue Cross Arena (Rochester, NY) (non-conference)

† Denotes Atlantic Hockey Tournament final game at Blue Cross Arena (non-conference)

§ Denotes NCAA tournament East Regional semifinal at Times Union Center (Albany, NY) (non-conference)

% Denotes NCAA Tournament East Regional final at Times Union Center (non-conference)

¤ Denotes NCAA Tournament national semifinal at Ford Field (Detroit) (non-conference)

== Player stats ==
=== Skaters ===
Note: GP = Games played; G = Goals (Shorthanded); A = Assists; Pts = Points; +/- = Plus–minus; PIM = Penalty minutes

Regular season
Player	GP	G	A	Pts	+/−	PIM
Ringwald, Dan	34	10	18	28	+17	12
Tanev, Chris	34	8	16	24	+28	4
Haltigin, Chris	34	8	10	18	+7	22
Alexin, Brent	34	3	15	18	+17	35
Hartley, Adam	34	7	8	15	+12	32
Favot, Andrew	33	11 (1)	26	37	+12	20
Burt, Cameron	33	13	23	36	0	44
Mazzei, Tyler	33	9	13	22	+8	46
Mazur, Alan	32	7	14	21	0	57
Matic, Stevan	32	7 (1)	10	17	+9	27
Cornacchia, Mark	32	6 (2)	5	11	+4	22
Saracino, Chris	32	2	6	8	+7	16
Murphy, Sean	31	4	11	15	+6	20
Knowles, Scott	31	4	11	15	+12	13
McReynolds, Taylor	31	3	3	6	+3	52
DeMichiel, Jared ^{(G)}	31	0	2	2	0	4
Brenner, Tyler	26	10	8	18	+3	22
Janda, Mike	25	4	4	8	0	10
Spivak, Daniel	25	0	0	0	+6	28
Smith, Jeff	18	1	4	5	+4	15
Potts, Bryan	15	1	0	1	−2	2
Eckenswiller, Trevor	13	0	3	3	0	6
Madolora, Shane ^{(G)}	4	0	0	0	0	0
Ropponen, Jan ^{(G)}	1	0	0	0	0	0
Clark, Riley ^{†}	0	0	0	0	0	0

- ^{†} Denotes player left team.
- ^{(G)} Denotes goaltender.

Playoffs
Player	GP	G	A	Pts	+/−	PIM
Burt, Cameron	7	3	8	11	−1	4
Favot, Andrew	7	2	7	9	+2	4
Ringwald, Dan	7	1	8	9	+5	0
Brenner, Tyler	7	5	3	8	+3	2
Haltigin, Chris	7	3	3	6	0	4
Tanev, Chris	7	2	2	4	+5	0
Saracino, Chris	7	0	4	4	+1	4
Alexin, Brent	7	1	2	3	+2	2
Cornacchia, Mark	7	1 (1)	2	3	+3	17
Hartley, Adam	7	1	2	3	+1	2
Mazzei, Tyler	7	1	2	3	+5	8
Janda, Mike	7	1	1	2	+1	6
Knowles, Scott	7	1	1	2	−1	4
Mazur, Alan	7	1	1	2	+2	10
McReynolds, Taylor	7	0	0	0	+1	10
Spivak, Daniel	7	0	0	0	+1	0
DeMichiel, Jared ^{(G)}	7	0	0	0	0	0
Murphy, Sean	5	2	2	4	+2	4
Matic, Stevan	5	1	0	1	0	4
Smith, Jeff	4	1	1	2	+4	2
Madolora, Shane ^{(G)}	1	0	0	0	0	0
Ropponen, Jan ^{(G)}	1	0	0	0	0	0
Potts, Bryan	0	0	0	0	0	0
Eckenswiller, Trevor	0	0	0	0	0	0

- ^{(G)} Denotes goaltender.

=== Goaltenders ===
Note: GP = Games played; TOI = Time on ice; GAA = Goals against average; W = Wins; L = Losses; T = Ties; SO = Shutouts; SA = Shots Against; GA = Goals against; SV% = Save percentage

Regular season
Player	GP	TOI	W	L	T	GA	GAA	SA	SV	Sv%	SO
DeMichiel, Jared	31	1846:05	21	9	1	65	2.11	811	746	.920	5
Madolora, Shane	4	189:42	1	2	0	8	2.53	98	90	.918	0
Ropponen, Jan	1	9:12	0	0	0	0	0.00	2	2	1.000	0
– Empty Net –	–	10:23	–	–	–	1	–	–	–	–	–

Playoffs
Player	GP	TOI	W	L	T	GA	GAA	SA	SV	Sv%	SO
DeMichiel, Jared	7	424:03	6	1	0	14	1.98	188	174	.926	1
Madolora, Shane	1	2:33	0	0	0	1	23.53	1	0	.000	0
Ropponen, Jan	1	2:32	0	0	0	1	23.68	3	2	.667	0
– Empty Net –	–	0:36	–	–	–	0	–	–	–	–	–

== See also ==
- 2009–10 NCAA Division I men's ice hockey season
