= Wayne Wilson (ice hockey) =

Canadian ice hockey player and coach (born 1963)

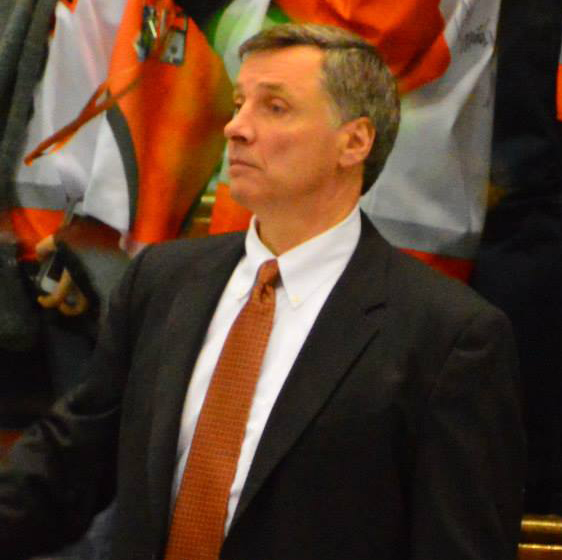

Current position
- Record: 354–301–69 (.537)

Biographical details
- Born: November 8, 1963 (age 62)
- Education: Bowling Green State University

Playing career
- 1980–1984: Bowling Green Falcons
- Position: Defenceman

Coaching career (HC unless noted)
- 1987–1988: New Hampshire (asst.)
- 1988–1999: Bowling Green (asst.)
- 1999–2025: RIT

Head coaching record
- Overall: 471–337–82 (.575)
- Tournaments: 6–7–2 (.467)

Accomplishments and honors

Championships
- 2000 ECAC West Champion; 2000 ECAC West tournament champion; 2001 ECAC West Champion; 2001 ECAC West tournament champion; 2002 ECAC West Champion; 2002 ECAC West tournament champion; 2003 ECAC West Champion; 2007 Atlantic Hockey Champion; 2009 Atlantic Hockey Champion; 2010 Atlantic Hockey Champion; 2010 Atlantic Hockey Tournament champion; 2011 Atlantic Hockey Champion; 2015 Atlantic Hockey tournament champion; 2016 Atlantic Hockey tournament champion; 2023 Atlantic Hockey Champion; 2024 Atlantic Hockey Champion; 2024 Atlantic Hockey tournament champion

Awards
- 2001 Edward Jeremiah Award; 2010 Spencer Penrose Award; 2023 Atlantic Hockey Coach of the Year; 2024 Atlantic Hockey Coach of the Year

J. Wayne Wilson (born November 8, 1963) is a retired Canadian former ice hockey coach and player. From 1999 to 2025, he was the head coach of the Rochester Institute of Technology men's ice hockey team, first at NCAA Division III and later at Division I.

== Playing career ==
Wilson grew up in Montreal, Quebec, but his family moved to Guelph, Ontario when he was sixteen. A defenceman, he played junior hockey for the Guelph Platers in the Ontario Hockey Association, then went on to college at Bowling Green State University in Ohio. He played four years (1980–1984) for the NCAA Division I Bowling Green Falcons, serving as captain in his senior year and leading the team to the 1984 national championship. He graduated with a degree in health, physical education, and recreation, then went on to get his master's degree in education from Bowling Green in 1987. While a grad student, he helped out as a part-time coach for the hockey team.

== Coaching career ==
After graduating with his masters, he spent one year as an assistant at the University of New Hampshire under coach Bob Kullen, but Kullen fell ill and that left his job in jeopardy. Seeking stability, he accepted a position as an assistant coach at his alma mater in 1988, a position he held through the 1998–99 school year. During that time, the Falcons made three NCAA tournament appearances. Several players (Rob Blake, Nelson Emerson and Brian Holzinger) went on to successful careers in the National Hockey League.

=== Rochester Institute of Technology ===
In 1999, after five years of seeking a head-coaching position, he was hired to be head coach at Division III Rochester Institute of Technology. He led the RIT Tigers to a nearly-undefeated season in 2000–01; their only loss was on home ice in the 2001 national championship game. That year, he won the Edward Jeremiah Award for the top coach in Division III men's hockey.

In his first six years at RIT, he compiled a 116–31–12 record (.767 winning percentage), with four ECAC West regular-season championships, three ECAC West tournament titles, and three NCAA tournament appearances. However, those all came in his first years at RIT; in 2003, the Tigers missed the D-III national tournament for the first time since 1995, and they would never return.

In late 2004, despite a couple of "down" years for the program (including "only" a 13–7–5 record in 2003–04), RIT President Albert J. Simone announced that RIT would move their hockey program up to the Division I level, retaining Wilson as head coach. RIT would join Atlantic Hockey starting in the 2006–07 season.

The rest of the 2004–05 campaign was rough, and the Tigers finished with their worst record of Wilson's tenure to date, including a painful loss to arch-rival Elmira College in which the Tigers squandered a late two-goal lead by allowing a pair of short-handed goals in the last three minutes of regulation. They would eventually lose in overtime 7–6.

The Tigers' first season as a Division I program, in which they played as an independent was even harder, although the highlight was a home win over the St. Lawrence Saints (ranked No. 18 in the nation at the time) thanks to a 66 save performance by goaltender Jocelyn Guimond. The Tigers won only nine games that season, mostly against future Atlantic Hockey conference opponents.

Since joining Atlantic Hockey in 2006, though, success has been the Tigers' hallmark. They won three regular-season conference championships in four years, and in 2010 they won their first conference tournament. That granted them the conference's autobid into the national tournament, where they stunned Denver and New Hampshire to win the East Regional and advance to the Frozen Four.

In 2010, in recognition of reaching the Frozen Four, Wilson won the Spencer Penrose Award, for the top coach in Division I men's ice hockey. He became the first coach to win both the Spencer Penrose Award and the Edward Jeremiah Award. He also signed a five-year contract that year, keeping him at RIT until at least the 2014–15 season.

During the 2014–15 season, Wilson led the Tigers to their second NCAA tournament appearance at the Division I level, where they knocked off the No. 1 overall seed Minnesota State Mavericks in the first round. Following the end of the 2014–15 season, Wilson signed a seven-year contract extension with RIT, through the 2022 season.

During the 2015–16 season, Wilson led the Tigers to a third NCAA tournament appearance at the Division I level where they faced the No. 1 overall seed Quinnipiac Bobcats. Unlike the previous season, there would be no upset as the Tigers were shutout 4–0.

In ten seasons of Division I play, Wilson has led the Tigers to several victories over nationally ranked teams. Under Wilson's tutelage, the Tigers have defeated at least one nationally-ranked team in nine out of ten Division I seasons.

On November 27, 2021, Wilson became the 47th head coach to record 400 career wins and the 29th to do so with one program. Wilson announced his retirement from coaching on April 9, 2025.

As Head Coach, 35 players went on to sign professional contracts. Notables include Steve Pinizzotto in 2007 who became the first RIT Tiger to sign an NHL contract at the Division 1 level. Chris Tanev signed with the Vancouver Canucks in June 2010 and became the first RIT alumnus to play in the NHL making his debut on January 18, 2011. He has also made his playoff debut in the 2011 Stanley Cup Finals suiting up in the Conference Finals for games 3, 4 and 5, and in the Stanley Cup Finals for games 5, 6 and 7. Tyler Brenner signed with the Toronto Maple Leafs in March 2011 on a two-year entry-level contract.

== Personal life ==
Wilson and his wife Lynn live in Pittsford, New York. Their daughter Stephanie Konczos attended Bowling Green State University, and their son Stu Wilson (who played ice hockey for Yale) is a professional ice hockey player.

== Head coaching record ==
Record table
Season	Team	Overall	Conference	Standing	Postseason
RIT Tigers (ECAC West) (1999–2005)
1999–00	RIT	21–7–1	5–1–0	1st	NCAA Quarterfinals
2000–01	RIT	27–1–1	6–0–0	1st	NCAA Runner-up
2001–02	RIT	23–2–2	9–1–0	1st	NCAA Quarterfinals
2002–03	RIT	19–4–2	8–1–1	1st	ECAC West Runner-up
2003–04	RIT	13–7–5	6–2–2	t-2nd	ECAC West Runner-up
2004–05	RIT	13–10–1	7–4–1	3rd	ECAC West Semifinal
RIT:		116–31–12	41–9–4		
RIT Tigers Independent (2005–2006)
2005–06	RIT	6–22–2			
RIT:		6–22–2			
RIT Tigers (Atlantic Hockey) (2006–2024)
2006–07	RIT	21–11–2	20–7–1	1st	^
2007–08	RIT	19–12–6	15–8–5	2nd	Atlantic Hockey Semifinals
2008–09	RIT	23–13–2	20–6–2	t-1st	Atlantic Hockey Semifinals
2009–10	RIT	28–12–1	22–5–1	1st	NCAA Frozen Four
2010–11	RIT	19–11–8	15–5–7	1st	Atlantic Hockey Runner-up
2011–12	RIT	20–13–6	14–7–6	3rd	Atlantic Hockey Runner-up
2012–13	RIT	15–18–5	11–12–4	8th	Atlantic Hockey Quarterfinals
2013–14	RIT	12–20–5	10–14–3	9th	Atlantic Hockey First Round
2014–15	RIT	20–15–5	14–9–5	t-3rd	NCAA Midwest Regional Final
2015–16	RIT	18–15–6	14–9–5	5th	NCAA Midwest Regional Semifinals
2016–17	RIT	14–22–1	13–15–0	t-6th	Atlantic Hockey First Round
2017–18	RIT	15–20–2	13–14–1	t-6th	Atlantic Hockey First Round
2018–19	RIT	17–17–4	13–11–4	5th	Atlantic Hockey Semifinals
2019–20	RIT	19–13–4	15–9–4	3rd	Tournament Cancelled
2020–21	RIT	9–9–2	7–5–1	5th	Atlantic Hockey Quarterfinals
2021–22	RIT	18–16–4	12–10–4	4th	Atlantic Hockey Semifinals
2022–23	RIT	25–13–1	18–7–1	1st	Atlantic Hockey Semifinals
2023–24	RIT	27–11–2	18–7–1	1st	NCAA West Regional Semifinals
RIT:		339–261–66 (.559)	264–160–55 (.609)		
RIT Tigers (AHA) (2024–2025)
2024–25	RIT	10–23–2	9–15–2	9th	AHA First Round
RIT:		10–23–2 (.314)	9–15–2 (.385)		
Total:		474–337–82 (.577)			
National champion Postseason invitational champion Conference regular season champion Conference regular season and conference tournament champion Division regular season champion Division regular season and conference tournament champion Conference tournament champion

== See also ==
- List of college men's ice hockey coaches with 400 wins

Awards and achievements
Preceded by Mike McShane	Edward Jeremiah Award; 2000–01	Succeeded by Dan Stauber
Preceded by Jack Parker	Spencer Penrose Award; 2009–10	Succeeded by Nate Leaman
Preceded by Eric Lang	Atlantic Hockey Coach of the Year; 2022–23 / 2023–24	Succeeded by Bill Riga (Atlantic Hockey America Coach of the Year)
