= 2009–10 NCAA Division I men's ice hockey season =

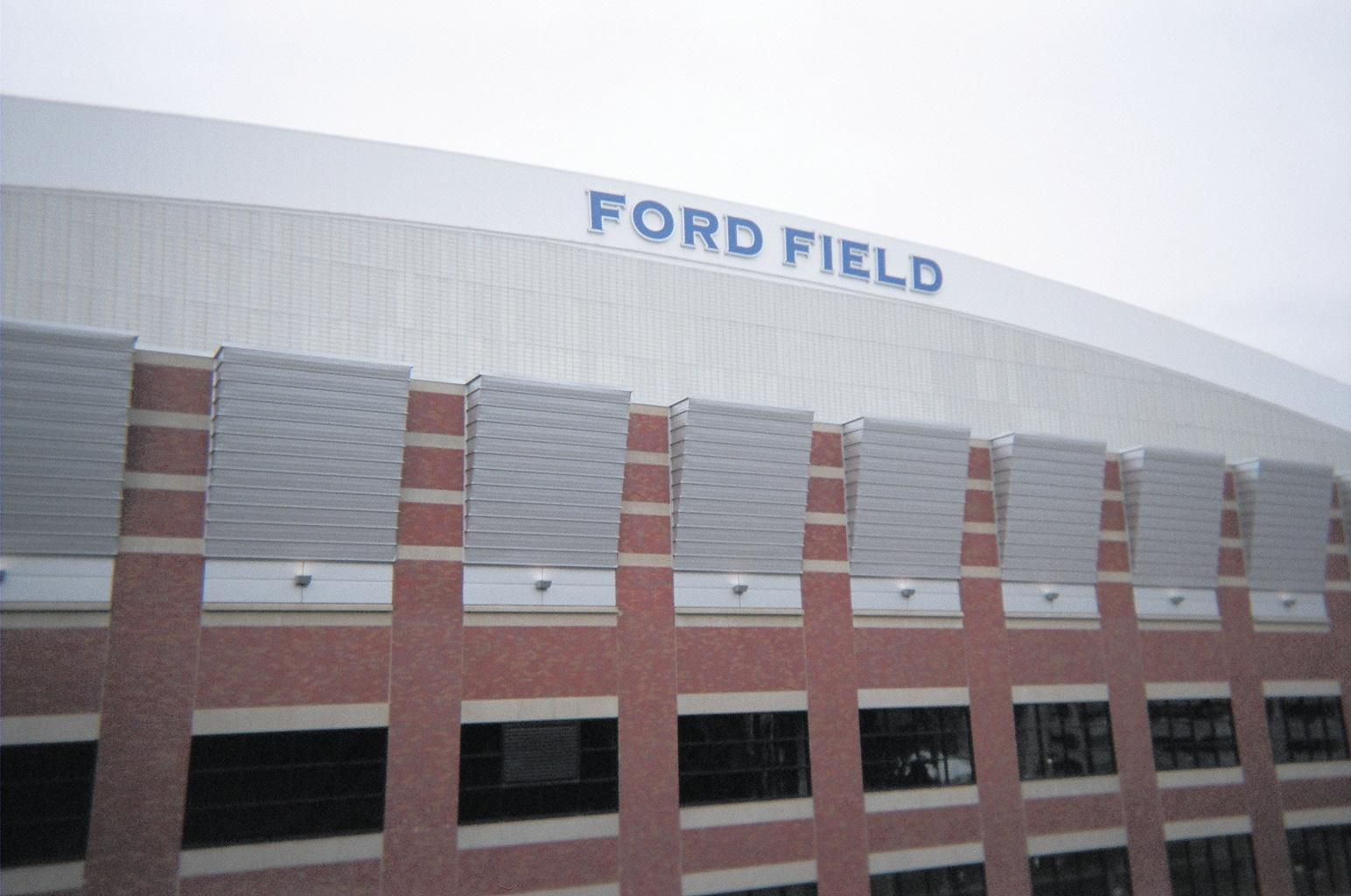
- Ford Field was the host of the 2010 Frozen Four
- Duration: October 8, 2009– April 10, 2010
- NCAA tournament: 2010
- National championship: Ford Field; Detroit, Michigan
- NCAA champion: Boston College
- Hobey Baker Award: Blake Geoffrion (Wisconsin)

The 2009–10 NCAA Division I men's ice hockey season began on October 8, 2009 and concluded with the 2010 NCAA Division I men's ice hockey tournament's championship game on April 10, 2010 at Ford Field in Detroit, Michigan. Denver and Miami entered the season as the nations' two top ranked teams. This was the 63rd season in which an NCAA ice hockey championship was held and is the 116th year overall where an NCAA school fielded a team.

== Season outlook ==
=== Pre-season polls ===
The top teams in the nation as ranked before the start of the season.

The U.S. College Hockey Online poll was voted on by coaches, media, and NHL scouts. The USA Today/USA Hockey Magazine poll was voted on by coaches and media.

USCHO Poll
Rank	Team
1	Denver (20)
2	Boston University (17)
3	Michigan (2)
4	Miami (5)
5	Notre Dame (2)
6	North Dakota
7	Cornell
8	Yale
9	Minnesota
10	Princeton
11	Massachusetts–Lowell
12	Boston College
13	Wisconsin
14	Vermont
15	St. Cloud State
16	New Hampshire
17	Ohio State
18	Minnesota–Duluth
19	Air Force
20	Northeastern

USA Today Poll
Rank	Team
1	Miami (4)
2	Denver (13)
3	Boston University (12)
4	Michigan
5	Notre Dame (5)
6	Minnesota
7	Cornell
8	North Dakota
9	Princeton
10	Massachusetts–Lowell
11	Yale
12	Boston College
13	St. Cloud State
14	Wisconsin
15	Vermont

== Regular season ==
=== Standings ===
2009–10 Atlantic Hockey standings
	Conference							Overall					
	GP	W	L	T	PTS	GF	GA	GP	W	L	T	GF	GA
#10 RIT†*	28	22	5	1	45	109	51	41	28	12	1	145	90
Sacred Heart	28	16	9	3	35	99	86	38	21	13	4	131	123
Air Force	28	14	8	6	34	86	70	37	16	15	6	103	96
Mercyhurst	28	15	10	3	33	103	70	38	15	20	3	121	118
Canisius	28	13	11	4	30	97	89	37	17	15	5	125	122
Army	28	10	12	6	26	80	83	36	11	18	7	98	114
Holy Cross	28	10	13	5	25	70	74	37	12	19	6	87	102
Bentley	28	10	15	3	23	78	105	35	12	19	4	94	123
Connecticut	28	6	19	3	15	48	91	37	7	27	3	59	135
American International	28	5	19	4	14	59	110	33	5	24	4	69	131
Championship: RIT † indicates conference regular season champion * indicates conference tournament champion Final rankings: USA Today/USA Hockey Magazine Top 15 Poll

2009–10 Central Collegiate Hockey Association standings
	Conference								Overall					
	GP	W	L	T	SW	PTS	GF	GA	GP	W	L	T	GF	GA
#3 Miami†	28	21	2	5	2	70	100	39	44	29	8	7	147	86
Michigan State	28	14	8	6	2	50	73	64	38	19	13	6	115	97
#14 Ferris State	28	13	9	6	4	49	79	66	40	21	13	6	118	92
#13 Northern Michigan	28	13	9	6	3	48	86	72	41	20	13	8	124	104
#15 Alaska	28	0^	28^	0^	0^	45	73	70	39	0^	39^	0^	108	93
Nebraska–Omaha	28	13	12	3	2	44	85	83	42	20	16	6	124	116
#8 Michigan*	28	14	13	1	0	43	83	69	45	26	18	1	148	102
Ohio State	28	10	12	6	4	40	81	93	39	15	18	6	110	122
Notre Dame	28	9	12	7	2	36	65	76	38	13	17	8	90	102
Lake Superior State	28	10	15	3	2	35	66	90	38	15	18	5	93	118
Bowling Green	28	4	18	6	5	23	58	102	36	5	25	6	71	138
Western Michigan	28	4	17	7	2	21	62	87	36	8	20	8	76	104
Championship: Michigan † indicates conference regular season champion * indicates conference tournament champion Final rankings: USA Today/USA Hockey Magazine Top 15 Poll^ Alaska was retroactively required to forfeit all wins and ties due to player ineligibilities.

2009–10 College Hockey America standings
	Conference							Overall					
	GP	W	L	T	PTS	GF	GA	GP	W	L	T	GF	GA
#12 Bemidji State†	18	14	3	1	29	71	40	37	23	10	4	128	87
Robert Morris	18	6	9	3	15	47	60	35	10	19	6	94	121
Alabama–Huntsville*	18	6	10	2	14	42	54	33	12	18	3	73	89
Niagara	18	6	10	2	14	53	59	36	12	20	4	107	118
Championship: Alabama–Huntsville † indicates conference regular season champion * indicates conference tournament champion Final rankings: USA Today/USA Hockey Magazine Top 15 Poll

2009–10 ECAC Hockey standings
	Conference							Overall					
	GP	W	L	T	PTS	GF	GA	GP	W	L	T	GF	GA
#6 Yale†	22	15	5	2	32	92	72	34	21	10	3	141	105
#9 Cornell*	22	14	5	3	31	74	43	34	21	9	4	107	67
Union	22	12	6	4	28	81	60	39	21	12	6	134	100
Colgate	22	12	8	2	26	78	70	36	15	15	6	118	119
St. Lawrence	22	9	8	5	23	62	61	42	19	16	7	118	121
Rensselaer	22	10	9	3	23	64	58	39	18	17	4	109	108
Quinnipiac	22	11	11	0	22	71	63	40	20	18	2	123	114
Princeton	22	8	12	2	18	65	76	31	12	16	3	91	103
Harvard	22	7	12	3	17	61	70	33	9	21	3	82	113
Dartmouth	22	7	12	3	17	69	79	32	10	19	3	96	115
Brown	22	6	12	4	16	64	95	37	13	20	4	103	134
Clarkson	22	4	15	3	11	50	84	37	9	24	4	92	136
Championship: Cornell † indicates conference regular season champion (Cleary Cup) * indicates conference tournament champion (Whitelaw Cup); Final rankings: USA Today/USA Hockey Magazine Top 15 Poll

2009–10 Hockey East standings
	Conference							Overall					
	GP	W	L	T	PTS	GF	GA	GP	W	L	T	GF	GA
#11 New Hampshire†	27	15	6	6	36	98	77	39	18	14	7	131	122
#1 Boston College*	27	16	8	3	35	99	61	42	29	10	3	171	104
Boston University	27	13	12	2	28	93	91	38	18	17	3	123	124
Maine	27	13	12	2	28	95	90	39	19	17	3	143	130
Massachusetts–Lowell	27	12	11	4	28	82	72	39	19	16	4	114	92
Merrimack	27	12	13	2	26	82	85	37	16	19	2	109	116
Massachusetts	27	13	14	0	26	72	86	36	18	18	0	105	117
Vermont	27	9	11	7	25	78	82	39	17	15	7	113	112
Northeastern	27	11	14	2	24	70	87	34	16	16	2	93	100
Providence	27	5	18	4	14	46	84	34	10	20	4	68	99
Championship: Boston College † indicates conference regular season champion * indicates conference tournament champion Final rankings: USA Today/USA Hockey Magazine Top 15 Poll

2009–10 Western Collegiate Hockey Association standings
	Conference							Overall					
	GP	W	L	T	PTS	GF	GA	GP	W	L	T	GF	GA
#4 Denver†	28	19	5	4	42	92	65	41	27	10	4	133	99
#2 Wisconsin	28	17	8	3	37	109	76	43	28	11	4	171	111
#5 St. Cloud State	28	15	9	4	34	90	77	43	24	14	5	138	122
Minnesota–Duluth	28	16	11	1	33	90	77	40	22	17	1	126	109
#7 North Dakota*	28	15	10	3	33	89	61	43	25	13	5	140	91
Colorado College	28	12	13	3	27	88	85	39	19	17	3	123	113
Minnesota	28	12	14	2	26	80	76	39	18	19	2	106	110
Minnesota State	28	9	17	2	20	75	92	39	16	20	3	110	112
Alaska–Anchorage	28	9	17	2	20	66	106	36	11	23	2	87	141
Michigan Tech	28	4	24	0	8	59	118	36	5	30	1	74	148
Championship: North Dakota † indicates conference regular season champion * indicates conference tournament champion Final rankings: USA Today/USA Hockey Magazine Top 15 Poll

== 2010 NCAA tournament ==
Regional semifinals
1	Miami	2
4	Alabama–Huntsville	1
Midwest Regional
2	Bemidji State	1
3	Michigan	5
1	Boston College	3
4	Alaska	1
Northeast Regional
2	North Dakota	2
3	Yale	3
1	Denver	1
4	RIT	2
East Regional
2	Cornell	2
3	New Hampshire	6
1	Wisconsin	3
4	Vermont	2
West Regional
2	St. Cloud State	4**
3	Northern Michigan	3

Regional Finals
1	Miami	3**
3	Michigan	2
1	Boston College	9
3	Yale	7
4	RIT	6
2	New Hampshire	2
1	Wisconsin	5
2	St. Cloud State	3

Frozen Four
MW1	Miami	1
NE1	Boston College	7
E4	RIT	1
W1	Wisconsin	8

National championship
NE1	Boston College	5
W1	Wisconsin	0

Note: * denotes overtime period(s)

== Player stats ==
=== Scoring leaders ===
The following players led the league in points at the conclusion of the season.

GP = Games played; G = Goals; A = Assists; Pts = Points; PIM = Penalty minutes

Player	Class	Team	GP	G	A	Pts	PIM
Gustav Nyquist	Sophomore	Maine	39	19	42	61	20
Derek Stepan	Sophomore	Wisconsin	41	12	42	54	8
Cam Atkinson	Sophomore	Boston College	42	30	23	53	30
Bobby Butler	Senior	New Hampshire	39	29	24	53	20
Cory Conacher	Junior	Canisius	35	20	33	53	36
Nick Johnson	Senior	Sacred Heart	38	27	25	52	51
Chase Polacek	Junior	RPI	39	26	26	52	48
Michael Davies	Senior	Wisconsin	41	20	32	52	48
Brendan Smith	Junior	Wisconsin	42	15	37	52	76
James Marcou	Junior	Massachusetts	36	11	40	51	36

=== Leading goaltenders ===
The following goaltenders led the league in goals against average at the end of the regular season while playing at least 33% of their team's total minutes.

GP = Games played; Min = Minutes played; W = Wins; L = Losses; OT = Overtime/shootout losses; GA = Goals against; SO = Shutouts; SV% = Save percentage; GAA = Goals against average

Player	Class	Team	GP	Min	W	L	OT	GA	SO	SV%	GAA
Cody Reichard	Sophomore	Miami	27	1,570:48	19	4	3	49	5	.921	1.87
Ben Scrivens	Senior	Cornell	34	2,018:28	21	9	4	63	7	.934	1.87
Connor Knapp	Sophomore	Miami	20	1,126:44	10	4	4	37	4	.921	1.97
Carter Hutton	Senior	Massachusetts–Lowell	27	1,614:12	13	12	2	55	4	.928	2.04
Corey Milan	Junior	Union	17	960:49	9	4	3	33	1	.917	2.06
Marc Cheverie	Junior	Denver	35	2,044:27	24	6	3	71	6	.932	2.08
Jared DeMichiel	Senior	RIT	38	2,270:08	27	10	1	79	6	.921	2.09
Brad Eidsness	Sophomore	North Dakota	41	2,387:54	24	10	4	84	3	.914	2.11
Pat Nagle	Junior	Ferris State	26	1,496:05	12	10	3	53	1	.923	2.13
Scott Greenham	Sophomore	Alaska	39	2,295:34	18	12	9	84	4	.919	2.20

== Awards ==
=== NCAA ===
Award		Recipient
Hobey Baker Award		Blake Geoffrion, Wisconsin
Spencer T. Penrose Award		Wayne Wilson, RIT
National Rookie of the Year		Stéphane Da Costa, Merrimack
Derek Hines Unsung Hero Award		Jordan Pietrus, Brown
Lowe's Senior CLASS Award		Colin Greening, Cornell
Tournament Most Outstanding Player		Ben Smith, Boston College
AHCA All-American Teams
East First Team	Position	West First Team
Ben Scrivens, Cornell	G	Marc Cheverie, Denver
Colby Cohen, Boston University	D	Brendan Smith, Wisconsin
Brendon Nash, Cornell	D	Patrick Wiercioch, Denver
Bobby Butler, New Hampshire	F	Blake Geoffrion, Wisconsin
Gustav Nyquist, Maine	F	Mark Olver, Northern Michigan
Chase Polacek, Rensselaer	F	Rhett Rakhshani, Denver
East Second Team	Position	West Second Team
Brian Foster, New Hampshire	G	Cody Reichard, Miami
Justin Braun, Massachusetts	D	Erik Gustafsson, Northern Michigan
Blake Kessel, New Hampshire	D	Jeff Petry, Michigan State
Sean Backman, Yale	F	Jack Connolly, Minnesota–Duluth
Nick Johnson, Sacred Heart	F	Zac Dalpe, Ohio State
Broc Little, Yale	F	Matt Read, Bemidji State

=== Atlantic Hockey ===
Award		Recipient
Player of the Year		Cory Conacher, Canisius
Best Defensive Forward		Dave Jarman, Sacred Heart
Best Defenseman		Dan Ringwald, RIT
Rookie of the Year		Christopher Tanev, RIT
Regular Season Goaltending Award		Jared DeMichiel, RIT
Coach of the Year		C. J. Marottolo, Sacred Heart
Most Valuable Player in Tournament		Cameron Burt, RIT
Individual Sportsmanship		Chris Risi, Mercyhurst
Regular Season Scoring Trophy		Cory Conacher, Canisius
All-Atlantic Hockey Teams
First Team	Position	Second Team
Jared DeMichiel, RIT	G	Andrew Volkening, Air Force
Tim Kirby, Air Force	D	Marcel Alvarez, Army
Dan Ringwald, RIT	D	Carl Hudson, Canisius
Cory Conacher, Canisius	F	Brandon Coccimigilo, Mercyhurst
Nick Johnson, Sacred Heart	F	Andrew Favot, RIT
Jacques Lamoureux, Air Force	F	Cody Omilusik, Army
Third Team	Position	Rookie Team
Ryan Zapolski, Mercyhurst	G	Steven Legato, Sacred Heart
Paul Ferraro, Sacred Heart	D	Alex Greke, Connecticut
Christopher Tanev, RIT	D	Christopher Tanev, RIT
Cameron Burt, RIT	F	Joe Campanelli, Bentley
Dave Jarman, Sacred Heart	F	Eric Delong, Sacred Heart
Vincent Scarcella, Canisius	F	Adam Pleskach, American International

=== CCHA ===
Awards		Recipient
Player of the Year		Cody Reichard, Miami
Best Defensive Forward		Tommy Wingels, Miami
Best Defensive Defenseman		Will Weber, Miami
Best Offensive Defenseman		Erik Gustafsson, Northern Michigan
Rookie of the Year		Andy Taranto, Alaska
Best Goaltender		Cody Reichard, Miami
Coach of the Year		Enrico Blasi, Miami
Terry Flanagan Memorial Award		Aaron Lewicki, Ferris State
Ilitch Humanitarian Award		Dion Knelsen, Alaska
Perani Cup Champion		Drew Palmisano, Michigan State
Scholar-Athlete of the Year		Dion Knelsen, Alaska
Most Valuable Player in Tournament		Shawn Hunwick, Michigan
All-CCHA Teams
First Team	Position	Second Team
Cody Reichard, Miami	G	Drew Palmisano, Michigan State
Erik Gustafsson, Northern Michigan	D	Zach Redmond, Ferris State
Eddie DelGrosso, Nebraska-Omaha	D	Jeff Petry, Michigan State
Mark Olver, Northern Michigan	F	Andy Miele, Miami
Jarod Palmer, Miami	F	Tommy Wingels, Miami
Zac Dalpe, Ohio State	F	Corey Tropp, Michigan State
Rookie Team	Position	
Mike Johnson, Notre Dame	G	
Joe Hartman, Miami	D	
Torey Krug, Michigan State	D	
Chris Brown, Michigan	F	
Terry Broadhurst, Nebraska-Omaha	F	
Andy Taranto, Alaska	F	

=== CHA ===
Award		Recipient
Player of the Year		Matt Read, Bemidji State
Rookie of the Year		Jordan George, Bemidji State
Coach of the Year		Tom Serratore, Bemidji State
Student-Athlete of the Year		Kyle Hardwick, Bemidji State
Most Valuable Player in Tournament		Cam Talbot, Alabama-Huntsville
All-CHA Teams
First Team	Position	Second Team
Dan Bakala, Bemidji State	G	Cam Talbot, Alabama-Huntsville
Denny Urban, Robert Morris	D	Dave Cowan, Robert Morris
Brad Hunt, Bemidji State	D	Tyler Gotto, Niagara
Matt Read, Bemidji State	F	Chris Kushneriuk, Robert Morris
Chris Moran, Niagara	F	Ian Lowe, Bemidji State
Nathan Longpre, Robert Morris	F	Ryan Olidis, Niagara
Rookie Team	Position	
Mathieu Dugas, Bemidji State	G	
Jason Beattie, Niagara	D	
Jake Areshenko, Bemidji State	D	
Stefan Salituro, Robert Morris	F	
Matti Järvinen, Alabama-Huntsville	F	
Jordan George, Bemidji State	F	

=== ECAC ===
Award		Recipient
Player of the Year		Chase Polacek, Rensselaer
Rookie of the Year		Jerry D'Amigo, Rensselaer
Tim Taylor Award		Nate Leaman, Union
Best Defensive Forward		Travis Vermeulen, St. Lawrence
Best Defensive Defenseman		Justin Krueger, Cornell
Ken Dryden Award		Ben Scrivens, Cornell
Student-Athlete of the Year		Colin Greening, Cornell
Most Outstanding Player in Tournament		Ben Scrivens, Cornell
All-ECAC Hockey Teams
First Team	Position	Second Team
Ben Scrivens, Cornell	G	Allen York, Rensselaer
Mike Schreiber, Union	D	Tom Dignard, Yale
Brendon Nash, Cornell	D	Taylor Fedun, Princeton
Chase Polacek, Rensselaer	F	Mario Valery-Trabucco, Union
Broc Little, Yale	F	David McIntyre, Colgate
Sean Backman, Yale	F	Colin Greening, Cornell
Third Team	Position	Rookie Team
Keith Kinkaid, Union	G	Keith Kinkaid, Union
Derek Keller, St. Lawrence	D	George Hughes, St. Lawrence
Evan Stephens, Dartmouth	D	Nicholas D'Agostino, Cornell
Riley Nash, Cornell	F	Jerry D'Amigo, Rensselaer
Aaron Volpatti, Brown	F	Brandon Pirri, Rensselaer
Travis Vermeulen, St. Lawrence	F	Louis Leblanc, Harvard

=== Hockey East ===
Award		Recipient
Player of the Year		Bobby Butler, New Hampshire
Rookie of the Year		Stéphane Da Costa, Merrimack
Bob Kullen Coach of the Year Award		Mark Dennehy, Merrimack
Bob Kullen Coach of the Year Award		Dick Umile, New Hampshire
Len Ceglarski Award		Ben Smith, Boston College
Best Defensive Forward		Ben Holmstrom, Massachusetts-Lowell
Best Defensive Defenseman		Justin Braun, Massachusetts
Three-Stars Award		Bobby Butler, New Hampshire
William Flynn Tournament Most Valuable Player		Matt Lombardi, Boston College
All-Hockey East Teams
First Team	Position	Second Team
Brian Foster, New Hampshire	G	Carter Hutton, Massachusetts-Lowell
Justin Braun, Massachusetts	D	Jeremy Dehner, Massachusetts-Lowell
Colby Cohen, Boston University	D	Jeff Dimmen, Maine
Blake Kessel, New Hampshire	D	
Bobby Butler, New Hampshire	F	Cam Atkinson, Boston College
Brian Gibbons, Boston College	F	Stéphane Da Costa, Merrimack
Gustav Nyquist, Maine	F	James Marcou, Massachusetts
Rookie Team	Position	
Chris Rawlings, Northeastern	G	
Brian Dumoulin, Boston College	D	
Jake Newton, Northeastern	D	
Max Nicastro, Boston University	D	
Stéphane Da Costa, Merrimack	F	
Chris Kreider, Boston College	F	
Sebastian Stalberg, Vermont	F	

=== WCHA ===
Award		Recipient
Player of the Year		Marc Cheverie, Denver
Defensive Player of the Year		Brendan Smith, Wisconsin
Rookie of the Year		Danny Kristo, North Dakota
Student-Athlete of the Year		Eli Vlaisavljevich, Michigan Tech
Coach of the Year		George Gwozdecky, Denver
Most Valuable Player in Tournament		Evan Trupp, North Dakota
All-WCHA Teams
First Team	Position	Second Team
Marc Cheverie, Denver	G	Brad Eidsness, North Dakota
Brendan Smith, Wisconsin	D	Ryan McDonagh, Wisconsin
Patrick Wiercioch, Denver	D	Nate Prosser, Colorado College
Rhett Rakhshani, Denver	F	Justin Fontaine, Minnesota-Duluth
Blake Geoffrion, Wisconsin	F	Ryan Lasch, St. Cloud State
Jack Connolly, Minnesota-Duluth	F	Tyler Ruegsegger, Denver
Third Team	Position	Rookie Team
Dan Dunn, St. Cloud State	G	Joe Howe, Colorado College
Garrett Raboin, St. Cloud State	D	Matt Donovan, Denver
Chay Genoway, North Dakota	D	Justin Schultz, Wisconsin
Michael Davies, Wisconsin	F	Danny Kristo, North Dakota
Joe Colborne, Denver	F	Craig Smith, Wisconsin
Rhett Rakhshani, Denver	F	Rylan Schwartz, Colorado College

== 2010 NHL entry draft ==
Round	Pick	Player	College	Conference	NHL team
1	14	Jaden Schwartz ^{†}	Colorado College	WCHA	St. Louis Blues
1	15	Derek Forbort ^{†}	North Dakota	WCHA	Los Angeles Kings
1	19	Nick Bjugstad ^{†}	Minnesota	WCHA	Florida Panthers
1	20	Beau Bennett ^{†}	Denver	WCHA	Pittsburgh Penguins
1	21	Riley Sheahan	Notre Dame	CCHA	Detroit Red Wings
1	24	Kevin Hayes ^{†}	Boston College	Hockey East	Chicago Blackhawks
1	28	Charlie Coyle ^{†}	Boston University	Hockey East	San Jose Sharks
1	30	Brock Nelson ^{†}	North Dakota	WCHA	New York Islanders
2	31	Tyler Pitlick	Minnesota State	WCHA	Edmonton Oilers
2	37	Justin Faulk ^{†}	Minnesota–Duluth	WCHA	Carolina Hurricanes
2	38	Jon Merrill ^{†}	Michigan	CCHA	New Jersey Devils
2	50	Connor Brickley ^{†}	Vermont	Hockey East	Florida Panthers
2	53	Mark Alt ^{†}	Minnesota	WCHA	Carolina Hurricanes
2	54	Justin Holl ^{†}	Minnesota	WCHA	Chicago Blackhawks
2	59	Jason Zucker ^{†}	Denver	WCHA	Minnesota Wild
2	60	Stephen Johns ^{†}	Notre Dame	CCHA	Chicago Blackhawks
3	67	Danny Biega	Harvard	ECAC Hockey	Carolina Hurricanes
3	69	Joe Basaraba ^{†}	Minnesota–Duluth	WCHA	Florida Panthers
3	74	Max Gardiner ^{†}	Minnesota	WCHA	St. Louis Blues
3	80	Bryan Rust ^{†}	Notre Dame	CCHA	Pittsburgh Penguins
3	82	Jason Clark ^{†}	Wisconsin	WCHA	New York Islanders
4	92	Sam Brittain ^{†}	Denver	WCHA	Florida Panthers
4	103	John Ramage	Wisconsin	WCHA	Calgary Flames
4	108	Bill Arnold ^{†}	Boston College	Hockey East	Calgary Flames
4	113	Mark MacMillan ^{†}	North Dakota	WCHA	Montreal Canadiens
4	114	Joe Faust ^{†}	Wisconsin	WCHA	New Jersey Devils
4	118	Jimmy Mullin ^{†}	Miami	CCHA	Tampa Bay Lightning
5	122	Chris Wagner ^{†}	Colgate	ECAC Hockey	Anaheim Ducks
5	127	Cody Ferriero ^{†}	Northeastern	Hockey East	San Jose Sharks
5	135	Justin Florek	Northern Michigan	WCHA	Boston Bruins
5	136	Isaac MacLeod ^{†}	Boston College	Hockey East	San Jose Sharks
5	140	Kenny Agostino ^{†}	Yale	ECAC Hockey	Pittsburgh Penguins
5	142	Caleb Herbert ^{†}	Minnesota–Duluth	WCHA	Washington Capitals
5	148	Kevin Gravel ^{†}	St. Cloud State	WCHA	Los Angeles Kings
5	149	Michael Parks ^{†}	North Dakota	WCHA	Philadelphia Flyers
5	150	Yasin Cissé ^{†}	Boston University	Hockey East	Atlanta Thrashers
6	156	Brendan O’Donnell ^{†}	North Dakota	WCHA	Tampa Bay Lightning
6	160	Tanner Lane ^{†}	Nebraska–Omaha	CCHA	Atlanta Thrashers
6	165	Zane Gothberg ^{†}	North Dakota	WCHA	Boston Bruins
6	168	Anthony Bitetto ^{†}	Northeastern	Hockey East	Nashville Predators
6	177	Kevin Lind ^{†}	Notre Dame	CCHA	Anaheim Ducks
6	179	Nick Luukko ^{†}	Vermont	Hockey East	Philadelphia Flyers
6	180	Nick Mattson ^{†}	North Dakota	WCHA	Chicago Blackhawks
7	183	R. J. Boyd ^{†}	Sacred Heart	Atlantic Hockey	Florida Panthers
7	184	Martin Ouellette ^{†}	Maine	Hockey East	Columbus Blue Jackets
7	185	Cody Rosen	Clarkson	ECAC Hockey	New York Islanders
7	188	Lee Moffie	Michigan	CCHA	San Jose Sharks
7	192	Brett Perlini	Michigan State	CCHA	Anaheim Ducks
7	196	Bryce Aneloski ^{‡}	Nebraska–Omaha	CCHA	Ottawa Senators
7	197	Luke Moffatt ^{†}	Michigan	CCHA	Colorado Avalanche
7	199	Peter Stoykewych ^{†}	Colorado College	WCHA	Atlanta Thrashers
7	200	Chris Crane ^{†}	Ohio State	CCHA	San Jose Sharks
7	201	Ben Marshall ^{†}	Minnesota	WCHA	Detroit Red Wings
7	202	Kellen Jones ^{†}	Quinnipiac	ECAC Hockey	Edmonton Oilers
7	203	Christian Isackson ^{†}	Minnesota	WCHA	Buffalo Sabres
7	210	Zach Trotman	Lake Superior State	CCHA	Boston Bruins

† incoming freshman
‡ Aneloski was in the process of transferring from Providence to Nebraska–Omaha

== See also ==
- 2009–10 NCAA Division II men's ice hockey season
- 2009–10 NCAA Division III men's ice hockey season
- 2009–10 NCAA Division I women's ice hockey season
- 2009–10 Atlantic Hockey season
