= Tyler Brenner =

Canadian ice hockey player (born 1988)

- Born: April 5, 1988 (age 37); Linwood, Ontario, Canada
- Height: 6 ft 2 in (188 cm)
- Weight: 201 lb (91 kg; 14 st 5 lb)
- Position: Defence
- Shoots: Right
- ECHL team Former teams: Toledo Walleye; AHL; Toronto Marlies; ECHL; Reading Royals; Bakersfield Condors
- NHL draft: Undrafted
- Playing career: 2011–present

Tyler Brenner (born April 5, 1988) is a Canadian professional ice hockey defenceman. He is currently playing with the Toledo Walleye of the ECHL.

Brenner played NCAA college hockey with the RIT Tigers men's ice hockey team.

On March 21, 2011, the Toronto Maple Leafs of the National Hockey League signed Brenner a two-year entry-level contract, and he was assigned to play with the Toronto Marlies of the American Hockey League for the remainder of the 2010–11 AHL season.

== Awards and honours ==
Award	Year
All-Atlantic Hockey Rookie Team	2008-09
Atlantic Hockey All-Tournament Team	2010
All-Atlantic Hockey Second Team	2010-11
