= Linwood, Ontario =

Linwood
- Unincorporated community
- Ament Line in Linwood

- Location within Regional Municipality of Waterloo Location within Southern Ontario
- Coordinates: 43°34′53″N 80°43′42″W
- Country: Canada
- Province: Ontario
- Regional municipality: Waterloo
- Township: Wellesley
- Elevation: 357 m (1,171 ft)
- Time zone: UTC-5 (EST)
  - Summer (DST): UTC-4 (EDT)
- Forward sortation area: N0B 1X0
- Area codes: 519 and 226
- FBXVU: GNBC Code

Linwood is an unincorporated community in the township of Wellesley, Region of Waterloo, Ontario, Canada. It is recognized as a designated place by Statistics Canada.

== Demographics ==
In the 2021 Census of Population conducted by Statistics Canada, Linwood had a population of 734 living in 271 of its 280 total private dwellings, a change of −3.3% from its 2016 population of 759. With a land area of 0.98 km^{2} (0.38 sq mi), it had a population density of 749.0/km^{2} (1,939.8/sq mi) in 2021.

== Notable people ==
- Tyler Brenner, ice hockey player.
- Almon Rennie, mayor of Tilsonburg, Ontario, member of the House of Commons of Canada from 1934 – 1945/
- Wallace Sterling, 5th President of Stanford University between 1949 and 1968.

== See also ==
- List of communities in Ontario
- List of designated places in Ontario
