= Jared DeMichiel =

American ice hockey player and coach

Current position
- Title: Associate head coach
- Team: Michigan State
- Conference: Big Ten

Biographical details
- Born: April 16, 1985 (age 41); Avon, Connecticut, U.S.
- Education: Rochester Institute of Technology

Playing career
- 2004–2005: Springfield Jr. Blues
- 2005–2006: Indiana Ice
- 2005–2006: Chicago Steel
- 2005–2006: Boston Harbor Wolves
- 2006–2010: RIT Tigers
- 2010–2011: South Carolina Stingrays
- 2010–2011: Hershey Bears
- 2010–2011: Elmira Jackals
- Position: Goaltender

Coaching career (HC unless noted)
- 2012–2014: Nazareth (assistant)
- 2014–2016: St. Lawrence (assistant)
- 2016–2022: Massachusetts (associate)
- 2022–Present: Michigan State (associate)

Jared DeMichiel (/dəˈmaɪkəl/; born April 16, 1985) is a former American professional ice hockey goaltender, currently an associate head coach at Michigan State University.

After ending his playing career in 2011, he accepted a position as volunteer goaltending coach for the women's ice hockey team at his alma mater, Rochester Institute of Technology. In 2012, he was hired as assistant coach for the new Nazareth program.

== Awards and honors ==
- Atlantic Hockey First All-Star Team (2009–10)
- 2010 AHA All-Tournament Team
- AHA Regular Season Goaltender of the Year (2009–10)
- Louis Spiotti Coaches Award - Player who embodies RIT hockey (2009–10)
- Most Outstanding Player in the 2010 NCAA Division I Men's Ice Hockey Tournament
- NCAA East Regional Most Outstanding Player (2009–10)
- 2010 Paychex Male College Athlete of the Year (Rochester Press–Radio Club)

== Records ==
- RIT Tigers men's ice hockey Division I record for most wins in a career (41) (Surpassed by Tommy Scarfone in 2023–24)
- RIT Tigers men's ice hockey Division I record for most shutouts in a career (7) (Surpassed by Tommy Scarfone in 2023–24)

== Career statistics ==
			Regular season									Playoffs
Season	Team	League	GP	W	L	T/OT	MIN	GA	SO	GAA	SV%	GP	W	L	MIN	GA	SO	GAA	SV%
2006–07	RIT	AHA	2	0	1	0	68	8	0	7.03	.778	—	—	—	—	—	—	—	—
2007–08	RIT	AHA	6	1	2	1	260	16	0	3.69	.868	—	—	—	—	—	—	—	—
2008–09	RIT	AHA	19	13	5	0	1114	48	1	2.59	.908	1	0	1	62	5	0	4.82	.861
2009–10	RIT	AHA	31	21	9	1	1846	65	5	2.11	.920	7	6	1	424	14	1	1.98	.926
NCAA totals			58	35	17	2	3288	137	6	2.50	.908	8	6	2	486	19	1	2.35	.915

== Awards and honours ==
Award	Year
Atlantic Hockey All-Tournament Team	2010

Awards and achievements
Preceded by Andrew Volkening	Atlantic Hockey Regular Season Goaltending Award; 2009-10	Succeeded by Shane Madolora
