= Nick Johnson (ice hockey, born 1986) =

American ice hockey player

- Born: August 25, 1986 (age 39) Windsor, Connecticut, U.S.
- Height: 5 ft 11 in (180 cm)
- Weight: 190 lb (86 kg; 13 st 8 lb)
- Position: Forward
- Shot: Left
- Played for: HC Plzeň; Schwenninger Wild Wings; HC Pardubice; Grizzlys Wolfsburg; South Carolina Stingrays
- NHL draft: Undrafted
- Playing career: 2010–2018

Nick Johnson (born August 25, 1986) is an American former professional ice hockey forward. He most recently played with the South Carolina Stingrays of the ECHL.

== Playing career ==
Undrafted out of Sacred Heart University, he first played professionally with HC Plzeň in the Czech Extraliga during the 2010–11 Czech Extraliga season. After his third season with Plzeň in 2012–13 and helping the franchise to its first championship, Johnson left as a free agent and signed a one-year contract in the German Deutsche Eishockey Liga (DEL), with newcomers Schwenninger Wild Wings on August 12, 2013.

After spending the first seven seasons of his professional career abroad in the Czech Republic and Germany, Johnson returned to North America as a free agent to sign a one-year ECHL contract with the South Carolina Stingrays on August 4, 2017. Johnson began the 2017–18 season on the Stingrays top offensive line and recorded 6 goals and 10 points in 16 games before opting for a mutual release from his contract on January 23, 2018.

== Awards and honors ==
Award	Year
College
All-Atlantic Hockey First Team	2010
AHCA East Second-Team All-American	2010
