= Milford Ice Pavilion =

Skating rink in Milford, Connecticut

Coordinates: 41.216378°N 73.091424°W

- The House that Marty Built
- Interactive map of Milford Ice Pavilion
- Location: 291 Bic Drive; Milford, CT 06460
- Owner: Milford Ice Pavilion
- Capacity: 1,000 (hockey)

Construction
- Opened: 1975

Tenants
- Sacred Heart Pioneers (1993-2016); Milford Mariners (High School Hockey)

Milford Ice Pavilion is a 1,000-seat skating rink in Milford, Connecticut. It is home to the Milford Indians co-op high school team, and Sacred Heart University Pioneers men's ice hockey team until 2016. The building opened in 1975 and was renovated in 1985. It also serves several local hockey high school and club level teams. It has been the home of the Sacred Heart hockey program since its inception in 1993.

Its sister facility was the Northford Ice Pavilion in North Branford, Connecticut. However, ownership of the Milford Ice recently changed and the two facilities no longer are related (except for the snack bars).
