= 2009–10 NCAA Division I men's ice hockey rankings =

- NCAA tournament: 2010
- NCAA champion: Boston College
- Preseason No. 1 (USA Today): Miami
- Preseason No. 1 (USCHO): Denver
- NCAA Division I men's ice hockey rankings

Two human polls made up the 2009–10 NCAA Division I men's ice hockey rankings, the USCHO.com/CBS College Sports poll and the USA Today/USA Hockey Magazine poll. As the 2009–10 season progressed, rankings were updated weekly.

== Legend ==
	Increase in ranking
	Decrease in ranking
	Not ranked previous week
(Italics)	Number of first place votes
#–#–#	Win–loss–tie record
т	Tied with team above or below also with this symbol

== USA Today/USA Hockey Magazine ==
	Preseason Sep 28	Week 1 Oct 12	Week 2 Oct 19	Week 3 Oct 26	Week 4 Nov 2	Week 5 Nov 9	Week 6 Nov 16	Week 7 Nov 23	Week 8 Nov 30	Week 9 Dec 7	Week 10 Dec 14	Week 11 Dec 21	Week 12 Jan 4	Week 13 Jan 11	Week 14 Jan 18	Week 15 Jan 25	Week 16 Feb 1	Week 17 Feb 8	Week 18 Feb 15	Week 19 Feb 22	Week 20 Mar 1	Week 21 Mar 8	Week 22 Mar 15	Week 23 Mar 22	Week 24 Mar 29	Final Apr 12	
1.	Miami (4)	Miami (2–0–0) (24)	Miami (3–0–1) (33)	Miami (4–1–1) (22)	Miami (6–1–1) (29)	Miami (8–1–1) (33)	Miami (8–1–3) (31)	Miami (9–1–4) (26)	Miami (9–2–5) (18)	Miami (11–2–5) (29)	Miami (13–2–5) (33)	Miami (13–2–5) (33)	Miami (13–2–5) (33)	Denver (14–5–3) (33)	Denver (14–5–3) (24)	Miami (16–4–6) (30)	Miami (18–4–6) (30)	Miami (20–4–6) (33)	Miami (22–4–6) (32)	Denver (22–6–4) (28)	Denver (24–6–4) (32)	Miami (24–5–7) (21)	Denver (27–7–4) (31)	Miami (27–7–7) (23)	Miami (29–7–7) (33)	Boston College (29–10–3) (34)	1.
2.	Denver (13)	Boston University (0–0–0) (9)	North Dakota (3–0–1)	North Dakota (4–1–1)	North Dakota (4–1–1)	North Dakota (4–1–1) (1)	North Dakota (7–2–1) (1)	Denver (8–3–1) (6)	Denver (9–4–1) (10)	Denver (10–4–2) (5)	Denver (11–5–2) (1)	Denver (11–5–2) (1)	Denver (13–5–2) (1)	Miami (13–4–5) (1)	Miami (15–4–5) (10)	Wisconsin (14–6–4) (3)	Denver (16–6–4) (4)	Denver (18–6–4) (1)	Denver (20–6–4) (2)	Miami (23–5–6) (6)	Miami (24–5–7) (2)	Denver (25–7–4) (13)	Miami (26–6–7) (3)	Boston College (25–10–3) (7)	Wisconsin (27–10–4)	Wisconsin (28–11–4)	2.
3.	Boston University (12)	Denver (1–1–0)	Boston University (0–1–0)	Denver (4–2–0) (11)	Denver (5–2–1) (4)	Denver (6–3–1)	Denver (6–3–1) (1)	Massachusetts–Lowell (8–2–1)	North Dakota (8–4–2) (3)	North Dakota (9–5–2)	Colorado College (11–4–3)	Colorado College (11–4–3)	Colorado College (12–5–3)	Wisconsin (12–5–3)	Wisconsin (13–6–3)	Denver (14–6–4) (1)	Wisconsin (15–7–4)	Wisconsin (16–7–4)	Wisconsin (18–7–4)	Wisconsin (19–8–4)	Wisconsin (21–8–4)	Wisconsin (22–9–4)	Wisconsin (24–9–4)	Denver (27–9–4) (3)	Boston College (27–10–3) (1)	Miami (29–8–7)	3.
4.	Michigan	North Dakota (2–0–0)	Michigan (1–1–0)	Boston University (1–2–0)	Michigan (4–2–0)	Cornell (3–0–0)	Massachusetts–Lowell (7–2–1) (1)	North Dakota (7–4–1)	Bemidji State (11–2–1) (1)	Bemidji State (13–2–1)	Cornell (7–2–2)	Cornell (7–2–2)	Wisconsin (12–5–3)	North Dakota (12–6–4)	Minnesota–Duluth (16–7–1)	North Dakota (13–8–5)	St. Cloud State (17–8–3)	St. Cloud State (18–8–4)	St. Cloud State (19–9–4)	Yale (18–6–3)	St. Cloud State (20–10–4)	Boston College (21–10–3)	Boston College (23–10–3)	North Dakota (25–12–5) (1)	St. Cloud State (24–14–5)	Denver (27–10–4)	4.
5.	Notre Dame (5)	Michigan (1–1–0)	Denver (2–2–0)	Michigan (2–2–0)	Boston University (2–3–0)	Massachusetts–Lowell (5–2–1)	Cornell (4–1–0)	Colorado College (9–2–1)	Colorado College (10–3–1) (1)	Cornell (7–2–2)	North Dakota (9–6–3)	Boston College (10–3–2)	North Dakota (10–6–4)	Yale (9–3–3)	Yale (10–4–3)	St. Cloud State (16–7–3)	Cornell (12–5–3)	Bemidji State (18–6–2)	Yale (16–6–3)	St. Cloud State (20–10–4)	Boston College (20–10–2)	North Dakota (20–11–5)	North Dakota (22–12–5)	Wisconsin (25–10–4)	Denver (27–10–4)	St. Cloud State (24–14–5)	5.
6.	Minnesota	Cornell (0–0–0)	Cornell (0–0–0)	Cornell (0–0–0)	Cornell (1–0–0)	Michigan (4–4–0)	Michigan State (9–2–1)	Bemidji State (10–1–1)	Quinnipiac (12–1–0) (1)	Colorado College (10–4–2)	Boston College (10–3–2)	North Dakota (9–6–3)	Yale (8–3–3)	Michigan State (15–6–3)	North Dakota (12–7–5)	Bemidji State (17–5–2)	Minnesota–Duluth (17–10–1)	Cornell (13–6–3)	Minnesota–Duluth (18–11–1)	Bemidji State (21–7–2)	Yale (19–7–3)	Yale (19–7–3)	St. Cloud State (22–12–5)	Cornell (21–8–4)	Yale (21–10–3)	Yale (21–10–3)	6.
7.	Cornell	Notre Dame (1–1–0)	Vermont (2–1–0) (1)	Yale (0–0–0) (1)	Yale (1–0–0) (1)	Bemidji State (7–0–1)	Colorado College (7–2–1)	Michigan State (9–3–2)	Cornell (6–2–1)	Yale (7–3–2)	Wisconsin (11–5–2)	Wisconsin (11–5–2)	Cornell (8–4–2)	Ferris State (16–4–2)	Cornell (9–4–3)	Yale (11–5–3)	Bemidji State (18–6–2)	Yale (14–6–3)	Bemidji State (19–7–2)	Boston College (18–10–2)	North Dakota (18–11–5)	St. Cloud State (20–11–5)	Cornell (19–8–4)	St. Cloud State (23–13–5)	North Dakota (25–13–5)	North Dakota (25–13–5)	7.
8.	North Dakota	Minnesota (0–0–0)	Princeton (0–0–0)	Massachusetts–Lowell (3–1–0)	Massachusetts–Lowell (4–2–0)	Notre Dame (5–4–1)	Bemidji State (8–1–1)	Cornell (5–2–0)	Massachusetts–Lowell (8–4–1)	Quinnipiac (12–3–0)	Yale (7–3–2)	Yale (7–3–2)	Boston College (10–5–2)	Cornell (8–4–2)	Colorado College (13–8–3)	Cornell (10–5–3)	Yale (12–6–3)	Minnesota–Duluth (18–11–1)	Colorado College (17–10–3)	North Dakota (16–11–5)	Bemidji State (22–8–2)	Bemidji State (23–8–3)	Ferris State (21–11–6)	Yale (20–9–3)	Michigan (26–18–1)	Michigan (26–18–1)	8.
9.	Princeton	Princeton (0–0–0)	Yale (0–0–0)	Princeton (0–0–0)	Notre Dame (4–3–1)	Alaska (6–1–1)	Yale (2–1–2)	Massachusetts (8–2–0)	Massachusetts (9–3–0)	Massachusetts–Lowell (9–5–1)	Bemidji State (13–4–1)	Bemidji State (13–4–1)	Michigan State (14–6–2)	Colorado College (12–7–3)	Ferris State (16–6–2)	Minnesota–Duluth (16–9–1)	North Dakota (13–10–5)	Colorado College (17–10–3)	Boston College (17–9–2)	Cornell (16–8–3)	Cornell (17–8–4)	Cornell (17–8–4)	Yale (20–9–3)	Bemidji State (23–9–4)	RIT (28–11–1)	Cornell (21–9–4)	9.
10.	Massachusetts–Lowell	Yale (0–0–0)	Notre Dame (2–2–0)	Vermont (2–2–0)	Nebraska–Omaha (4–0–2)	Massachusetts (6–1–0)	Alaska (7–2–1)	Quinnipiac (10–1–0)	Yale (5–2–2)	Boston College (8–3–2)	Quinnipiac (13–3–1)	Quinnipiac (13–3–1)	Bemidji State (14–4–2)	Minnesota–Duluth (14–7–1)	Boston College (12–6–2)	Ferris State (17–7–2)	Colorado College (15–10–3)	Boston College (15–8–2)	Cornell (14–7–3)	New Hampshire (15–10–5)	New Hampshire (16–10–6)	New Hampshire (16–11–7)	Bemidji State (23–9–4)	Northern Michigan (20–12–8)	Cornell (21–9–4)	RIT (28–12–1)	10.
11.	Yale	Vermont (1–1–0)	Minnesota (0–1–1)	Notre Dame (3–3–0)	Colorado College (4–1–1)	Yale (1–1–1)	Massachusetts (7–2–0)	Yale (3–2–2)	Michigan State (9–5–2)	Wisconsin (10–5–1)	Ferris State (13–3–2)	Ferris State (13–3–2)	Quinnipiac (13–4–1)	Bemidji State (14–4–2)	Michigan State (15–7–4)	Colorado College (14–9–3)	Ferris State (17–8–3)	North Dakota (13–10–5)	North Dakota (14–11–5)	Minnesota–Duluth (18–13–1)	Michigan State (19–11–6)	Michigan State (19–11–6)	Minnesota–Duluth (22–16–1)	Michigan (25–17–1)	New Hampshire (18–14–7)	New Hampshire (18–14–7)	11.
12.	Boston College	Boston College (0–0–0) (1)	Massachusetts–Lowell (1–1–0)	Boston College (1–1–0)	Bemidji State (5–0–1)	Nebraska–Omaha (4–1–3)	Nebraska–Omaha (5–2–3)	Alaska (8–3–1)	Minnesota–Duluth (9–4–1)	Ferris State (11–3–2)	Massachusetts–Lowell (10–6–1)	Massachusetts–Lowell (10–6–1)	Ferris State (14–4–2)	Boston College (10–6–2)	St. Cloud State (14–7–3)	New Hampshire (12–7–4)	Michigan State (17–9–4)	Maine (14–9–3)	Michigan State (17–10–5)	Colorado College (17–12–3)	Minnesota–Duluth (19–14–1)	Alaska (18–9–9)	Northern Michigan (19–11–8)	New Hampshire (17–13–7)	Bemidji State (23–10–4)	Bemidji State (23–10–4)	12.
13.	St. Cloud State	Massachusetts–Lowell (1–1–0)	Nebraska–Omaha (3–0–1)	Nebraska–Omaha (3–0–1)	Princeton (1–1–0)	Colorado College (5–2–1)	Quinnipiac (8–1–0)	Minnesota–Duluth (9–4–1)	Alaska (8–3–3)	Michigan State (10–6–2)	Michigan State (12–6–2)	Michigan State (12–6–2)	Minnesota–Duluth (12–7–1)	Union (12–4–5)	Union (13–4–5)	Michigan State (16–8–4)	New Hampshire (13–8–4)	Ferris State (17–9–4)	New Hampshire (14–10–4)	Michigan State (18–11–5)	Alaska (16–9–9)	Ferris State (19–11–6)	New Hampshire (17–13–7)	Alaska (18–11–9)	Northern Michigan (20–13–8)	Northern Michigan (20–13–8)	13.
14.	Wisconsin	Wisconsin (0–0–0)	Minnesota–Duluth (3–1–0)	Colorado College (3–0–1)	Alaska (5–0–1)	Michigan State (7–2–1)	Notre Dame (5–5–2)	Notre Dame (6–5–3)	Boston College (6–3–2)	Minnesota–Duluth (10–5–1)	Minnesota–Duluth (11–6–1)	Minnesota–Duluth (11–6–1)	Massachusetts–Lowell (11–7–1)	Massachusetts–Lowell (12–7–2)	Bemidji State (15–5–2)	Massachusetts (15–9–0)	Boston College (13–8–2)	Michigan State (17–10–5)	Ferris State (18–10–4)	Ferris State (19–11–4)	Ferris State (19–11–6)	Minnesota–Duluth (20–15–1)	Vermont (17–13–7)	Vermont (17–14–7)	Ferris State (21–13–6)	Ferris State (21–13–6)	14.
15.	Vermont	Nebraska–Omaha (2–0–0)	Boston College (0–1–0)	Bemidji State (4–1–1)	Vermont (2–3–0)	Vermont (3–3–1)	Michigan (4–6–0)	Boston College (5–3–2)	Notre Dame (7–5–4)	Massachusetts (9–5–0)	Massachusetts (10–5–0)	Massachusetts (10–5–0)	St. Cloud State (10–7–3)	St. Cloud State (12–7–3)	Massachusetts (14–8–0)	Boston College (12–8–2)	Massachusetts (16–10–0)	New Hampshire (13–10–4)	Maine (14–11–3)	Union (18–8–6)	Colorado College (17–14–3)	Colorado College (18–15–3)	Union (20–11–6)	Ferris State (21–13–6)	Alaska (18–12–9)	Alaska (18–12–9)	15.
	Preseason Sep 28	Week 1 Oct 12	Week 2 Oct 19	Week 3 Oct 26	Week 4 Nov 2	Week 5 Nov 9	Week 6 Nov 16	Week 7 Nov 23	Week 8 Nov 30	Week 9 Dec 7	Week 10 Dec 14	Week 11 Dec 21	Week 12 Jan 4	Week 13 Jan 11	Week 14 Jan 18	Week 15 Jan 25	Week 16 Feb 1	Week 17 Feb 8	Week 18 Feb 15	Week 19 Feb 22	Week 20 Mar 1	Week 21 Mar 8	Week 22 Mar 15	Week 23 Mar 22	Week 24 Mar 29	Final Apr 12	
		Dropped: St. Cloud State	Dropped: Wisconsin	Dropped: Minnesota; Minnesota–Duluth	Dropped: Boston College	Dropped: Boston University; Princeton	Dropped: Vermont	Dropped: Michigan; Nebraska–Omaha	None	Dropped: Alaska; Notre Dame	None	None	Dropped: Massachusetts	Dropped: Quinnipiac	Dropped: Massachusetts–Lowell	Dropped: Union	None	Dropped: Massachusetts	None	Dropped: Maine	Dropped: Union	None	Dropped: Alaska; Colorado College; Michigan State	Dropped: Minnesota–Duluth; Union	Dropped: Vermont	None	

== USCHO ==
	Preseason Oct 5	Week 1 Oct 13	Week 2 Oct 19	Week 3 Oct 26	Week 4 Nov 2	Week 5 Nov 9	Week 6 Nov 16	Week 7 Nov 23	Week 8 Nov 30	Week 9 Dec 7	Week 10 Dec 14	Week 12 Jan 4	Week 13 Jan 11	Week 14 Jan 18	Week 15 Jan 25	Week 16 Feb 1	Week 17 Feb 8	Week 18 Feb 15	Week 19 Feb 22	Week 20 Mar 1	Week 21 Mar 8	Week 22 Mar 15	Final Mar 22	
1.	Denver (20)	Miami (2–0–0) (28)	Miami (3–0–1) (46)	Miami (4–1–1) (26)	Miami (6–1–1) (41)	Miami (8–1–1) (49)	Miami (8–1–3) (42)	Miami (9–1–4) (37)	Miami (9–2–5) (20)	Miami (11–2–5) (36)	Miami (13–2–5) (48)	Miami (13–2–5) (45)	Denver (14–5–3) (45)	Denver (14–5–3) (39)	Miami (16–4–6) (37)	Miami (18–4–6) (43)	Miami (20–4–6) (46)	Miami (22–4–6) (45)	Denver (22–6–4) (39)	Denver (24–6–4) (48)	Denver (25–7–4) (26)	Denver (27–7–4) (46)	Miami (27–7–7) (28)	1.
2.	Boston University (17)	Boston University (0–0–0) (17)	North Dakota (3–0–1) (1)	Denver (4–2–0) (20)	Denver (5–2–1) (4)	North Dakota (4–1–1) (1)	North Dakota (7–2–1) (2)	Denver (8–3–1) (9)	Denver (9–4–1) (14)	Denver (10–4–2) (11)	Denver (11–5–2) (2)	Denver (13–5–2) (5)	Miami (13–4–5) (5)	Miami (15–4–5) (11)	Wisconsin (14–6–4) (8)	Denver (16–6–4) (6)	Denver (18–6–4) (3)	Denver (20–6–4) (5)	Miami (23–5–6) (11)	Miami (24–5–7) (2)	Miami (24–5–7) (24)	Miami (26–6–7) (4)	Denver (27–9–4) (6)	2.
3.	Michigan (2)	Denver (1–1–0)	Boston University (0–1–0) (2)	North Dakota (4–1–1) (1)	North Dakota (4–1–1)	Cornell (3–0–0)	Denver (6–3–1) (2)	Massachusetts–Lowell (8–2–1) (2)	North Dakota (8–4–2) (7)	North Dakota (9–5–2)	Colorado College (11–4–3)	Colorado College (12–5–3)	Wisconsin (12–5–3)	Wisconsin (13–6–3)	Denver (14–6–4) (5)	Wisconsin (15–7–4) (1)	Wisconsin (16–7–4) (1)	Wisconsin (18–7–4)	Wisconsin (19–8–4)	Wisconsin (21–8–4)	Wisconsin (22–9–4)	Wisconsin (24–9–4)	Boston College (25–10–3) (8)	3.
4.	Miami (5)	North Dakota (2–0–0)	Denver (2–2–0)	Boston University (1–2–0)	Michigan (4–2–0)	Denver (6–3–1)	Massachusetts–Lowell (7–2–1) (3)	North Dakota (7–4–1)	Quinnipiac (12–1–0) (7)	Bemidji State (13–2–1) (2)	Cornell (7–2–2)	Wisconsin (12–5–3)	North Dakota (12–6–4)	Minnesota–Duluth (16–7–1)	North Dakota (13–8–5)	St. Cloud State (17–8–3)	St. Cloud State (18–8–4)	St. Cloud State (19–9–4)	St. Cloud State (20–10–4)	St. Cloud State (20–10–4)	Boston College (21–10–3)	Boston College (23–10–3)	North Dakota (25–12–5) (4)	4.
5.	Notre Dame (2)	Michigan (1–1–0)	Michigan (1–1–0)	Michigan (2–2–0)	Cornell (1–0–0)	Massachusetts–Lowell (5–2–1)	Cornell (4–1–0)	Colorado College (9–2–1)	Bemidji State (11–2–1) (2)	Cornell (7–2–2) (1)	Boston College (10–3–2)	North Dakota (10–6–4)	Yale (9–3–3)	North Dakota (12–7–5)	St. Cloud State (16–7–3)	Cornell (12–5–3)	Bemidji State (18–6–2)	Yale (16–6–3)	Yale (18–6–3)	Boston College (20–10–2)	North Dakota (20–11–5)	North Dakota (22–12–5)	Wisconsin (25–10–4) (2)	5.
6.	North Dakota	Cornell (0–0–0)	Cornell (0–0–0)	Cornell (0–0–0)	Yale (1–0–0) (1)	Michigan (4–4–0)	Michigan State (9–2–1) (1)	Bemidji State (10–1–1) (2)	Colorado College (10–3–1)	Colorado College (10–4–2)	North Dakota (9–6–3)	Yale (8–3–3)	Ferris State (16–4–2)	Yale (10–4–3)	Yale (11–5–3)	Minnesota–Duluth (17–10–1)	Yale (14–6–3)	Minnesota–Duluth (18–11–1)	Bemidji State (21–7–2)	Yale (19–7–3)	Yale (19–7–3)	St. Cloud State (22–12–5)	Cornell (21–8–4)	6.
7.	Cornell	Notre Dame (1–1–0)	Vermont (2–1–0) (1)	Yale (0–0–0) (1)	Boston University (2–3–0)	Bemidji State (7–0–1)	Colorado College (7–2–1)	Cornell (5–2–0)	Cornell (6–2–1)	Quinnipiac (12–3–0)	Wisconsin (11–5–2)	Boston College (10–5–2)	Michigan State (15–6–3)	Colorado College (13–8–3)	Bemidji State (17–5–2)	Bemidji State (18–6–2)	Minnesota–Duluth (18–11–1)	Colorado College (17–10–3)	Boston College (18–10–2)	North Dakota (18–11–5)	St. Cloud State (20–11–5)	Cornell (19–8–4)	St. Cloud State (23–13–5)	7.
8.	Yale	Yale (0–0–0)	Yale (0–0–0)	Notre Dame (3–3–0)	Massachusetts–Lowell (4–2–0)	Notre Dame (5–4–1)	Bemidji State (8–1–1)	Michigan State (9–3–2)	Massachusetts–Lowell (8–4–1)	Yale (7–3–2)	Quinnipiac (13–3–1)	Cornell (8–4–2)	Colorado College (12–7–3)	Ferris State (16–6–2)	Cornell (10–5–3)	Yale (12–6–3)	Cornell (13–6–3)	Boston College (17–9–2)	North Dakota (16–11–5)	Bemidji State (22–8–2)	Bemidji State (23–8–3)	Ferris State (21–11–6)	Yale (20–9–3)	8.
9.	Minnesota	Minnesota (0–0–0)	Notre Dame (2–2–0)	Massachusetts–Lowell (3–1–0)	Notre Dame (4–3–1)	Alaska (6–1–1)	Yale (2–1–2)	Quinnipiac (10–1–0)	Massachusetts (9–3–0)	Massachusetts–Lowell (9–5–1)	Yale (7–3–2)	Michigan State (14–6–2)	Cornell (8–4–2)	Cornell (9–4–3)	Minnesota–Duluth (16–9–1)	North Dakota (13–10–5)	Colorado College (17–10–3)	Bemidji State (19–7–2)	Cornell (16–8–3)	Cornell (17–8–4)	Cornell (17–8–4)	Yale (20–9–3)	Northern Michigan (20–12–8)	9.
10.	Princeton	Princeton (0–0–0)	Princeton (0–0–0)	Vermont (2–2–0)	Nebraska–Omaha (4–0–2)	Colorado College (5–2–1)	Alaska (7–2–1)	Massachusetts (8–2–0)	Yale (5–2–2)	Boston College (8–3–2)	Bemidji State (13–4–1)	Bemidji State (14–4–2)	Minnesota–Duluth (14–7–1)	Michigan State (15–7–4)	Ferris State (17–7–2)	Colorado College (15–10–3)	Boston College (15–8–2)	Cornell (14–7–3)	Minnesota–Duluth (18–13–1)	New Hampshire (16–10–6)	Michigan State (19–11–6)	Bemidji State (23–9–4)	Bemidji State (23–9–4)	10.
11.	Massachusetts–Lowell	Vermont (1–1–0)	Minnesota (0–1–1)	Princeton (0–0–0)	Bemidji State (5–0–1)	Nebraska–Omaha (4–1–3)	Massachusetts (7–2–0)	Yale (3–2–2)	Michigan State (9–5–2)	Wisconsin (10–5–1)	Ferris State (13–3–2)	Ferris State (14–4–2)	Bemidji State (14–4–2)	Boston College (12–6–2)	Colorado College (14–9–3)	Ferris State (17–8–3)	North Dakota (13–10–5)	North Dakota (14–11–5)	New Hampshire (15–10–5)	Michigan State (19–11–6)	New Hampshire (16–11–7)	Minnesota–Duluth (22–16–1)	Michigan (25–17–1)	11.
12.	Boston College	Boston College (0–0–0)	Nebraska–Omaha (3–0–1)	Nebraska–Omaha (3–0–1)	Colorado College (4–1–1)	Yale (1–1–1)	Nebraska–Omaha (5–2–3)	Alaska (8–3–1)	Alaska (8–3–3)	Minnesota–Duluth (10–5–1)	Minnesota–Duluth (11–6–1)	Quinnipiac (13–4–1)	Boston College (10–6–2)	St. Cloud State (14–7–3)	Michigan State (16–8–4)	Michigan State (17–9–4)	Maine (14–9–3)	Michigan State (17–10–5)	Michigan State (18–11–5)	Minnesota–Duluth (19–14–1)	Alaska (18–9–9)	Northern Michigan (19–11–8)	New Hampshire (17–13–7)	12.
13.	Wisconsin	Wisconsin (0–0–0)	Massachusetts–Lowell (1–1–0)	Boston College (1–1–0)	Alaska (5–0–1)	Michigan State (7–2–1)	Quinnipiac (8–1–0)	Notre Dame (6–5–3)	Minnesota–Duluth (9–4–1)	Ferris State (11–3–2)	Michigan State (12–6–2)	Minnesota–Duluth (12–7–1)	Union (12–4–5)	Union (13–4–5)	New Hampshire (12–7–4)	New Hampshire (13–8–4)	Michigan State (17–10–5)	New Hampshire (14–10–4)	Colorado College (17–12–3)	Ferris State (19–11–6)	Ferris State (19–11–6)	New Hampshire (17–13–7)	Ferris State (21–13–6)	13.
14.	Vermont	Massachusetts–Lowell (1–1–0)	Boston College (0–1–0)	Bemidji State (3–0–1)	Princeton (1–1–0)	Massachusetts (6–1–0)	Notre Dame (5–5–2)	Minnesota–Duluth (9–4–1)	Notre Dame (7–5–4)	Michigan State (10–6–2)	Massachusetts–Lowell (10–6–1)	Massachusetts–Lowell (11–7–1)	St. Cloud State (12–7–3)	Bemidji State (15–5–2)	Boston College (12–8–2)	Boston College (13–8–2)	Ferris State (17–9–4)	Ferris State (18–10–4)	Ferris State (19–11–4)	Alaska (16–9–9)	Minnesota–Duluth (20–15–1)	Vermont (17–13–7)	Minnesota–Duluth (22–17–1)	14.
15.	St. Cloud State	Bemidji State (2–0–0)	Alaska (3–0–1)	Colorado College (4–1–1)	Vermont (2–3–0)	Vermont (3–3–1)	Wisconsin (6–3–1)	Wisconsin (7–4–1)	Boston College (6–3–2)	Massachusetts (9–5–0)	Massachusetts (10–5–0)	St. Cloud State (10–7–3)	Massachusetts–Lowell (12–7–2)	Massachusetts (14–8–0)	Massachusetts (15–9–0)	Massachusetts (16–10–0)	New Hampshire (13–10–4)	Maine (14–11–3)	Union (18–8–6)	Colorado College (17–14–3)	Colorado College (18–15–3)	Union (20–11–6)	Vermont (17–14–7)	15.
16.	New Hampshire	Nebraska–Omaha (2–0–0)	Bemidji State (2–0–0)	Alaska (3–0–1)	Boston College (2–2–0)	Boston College (3–2–1)	Michigan (4–6–0)	Boston College (5–3–2)	Wisconsin (8–5–1)	Alaska (8–4–4)	New Hampshire (8–6–3)	Massachusetts (11–7–0)	Maine (11–7–2)	New Hampshire (10–7–4)	Massachusetts–Lowell (14–9–2)	Maine (12–9–3)	Union (15–7–6)	Union (16–8–6)	Maine (15–12–3)	Vermont (15–11–6)	Northern Michigan (17–11–8)	Michigan State (19–13–6)	Union (21–12–6)	16.
17.	Ohio State	Alaska (2–0–0)	Wisconsin (0–1–1)	Massachusetts (3–0–0)	Michigan State (6–2–0)	Boston University (2–5–0)	Boston College (4–3–1) т	Ferris State (9–3–2)	Ferris State (9–3–2)	St. Cloud State (8–6–2)	Alaska (9–5–4)	Union (10–4–5)	Quinnipiac (13–7–1)	Vermont (11–7–2)	Vermont (12–8–2)	Vermont (12–9–3)	Vermont (13–9–4)	Vermont (13–10–5)	Alaska (14–9–9)	Maine (16–13–3)	Union (18–10–6)	Michigan (23–17–1)	Alaska (18–11–9)	17.
18.	Minnesota–Duluth	Quinnipiac (2–0–0)	Minnesota–Duluth (3–1–0)	Quinnipiac (3–0–0)	Wisconsin (3–2–1)	Minnesota–Duluth (6–3–1)	Vermont (4–4–1) т	Vermont (4–4–1)	Nebraska–Omaha (7–4–3)	Notre Dame (7–7–4)	Union (8–3–5)	Maine (10–7–2)	Vermont (10–6–2)	Lake Superior State (14–8–4)	Union (13–6–5)	Massachusetts–Lowell (14–10–2)	Massachusetts (16–11–0)	Massachusetts (16–13–0)	Vermont (13–11–6)	Union (18–10–6)	Nebraska–Omaha (20–14–6)	Alaska (18–11–9)	Maine (19–17–3)	18.
19.	Air Force	St. Cloud State (0–2–0)	Colorado College (2–1–1)	Wisconsin (1–2–1)	Massachusetts (4–1–0)	Princeton (2–2–0)	Princeton (3–2–1)	Nebraska–Omaha (5–4–3)	Vermont (5–5–1)	New Hampshire (7–6–3)	St. Cloud State (8–7–3)	Vermont (10–6–2)	Massachusetts (12–8–0)	Massachusetts–Lowell (12–9–2)	Maine (11–9–2)	Michigan (15–12–1)	Michigan (16–13–1)	Boston University (13–12–3)	Nebraska–Omaha (17–13–6)	Northern Michigan (17–11–8)	Vermont (15–12–7)	Maine (18–16–3)	Michigan State (19–13–6)	19.
20.	Northeastern	Northeastern (1–1–0)	Quinnipiac (3–0–0)	Michigan State (4–2–0)	Minnesota–Duluth (5–2–1)	Quinnipiac (6–1–0)	Minnesota–Duluth (7–4–1)	Colgate (6–3–4)	St. Cloud State (6–6–2)	Union (7–3–5)	Notre Dame (8–8–4)	Alaska (9–5–4)	New Hampshire (9–7–4)	Maine (11–9–2)	Michigan (14–11–1)	Union (13–7–6)	Massachusetts–Lowell (14–12–2)	Alaska (12–9–9)	Boston University (14–13–3)	Nebraska–Omaha (18–14–6)	Massachusetts–Lowell (18–14–4)	Boston University (18–16–3)	RIT (26–11–1)	20.
	Preseason Oct 5	Week 1 Oct 13	Week 2 Oct 19	Week 3 Oct 26	Week 4 Nov 2	Week 5 Nov 9	Week 6 Nov 16	Week 7 Nov 23	Week 8 Nov 30	Week 9 Dec 7	Week 10 Dec 14	Week 12 Jan 4	Week 13 Jan 11	Week 14 Jan 18	Week 15 Jan 25	Week 16 Feb 1	Week 17 Feb 8	Week 18 Feb 15	Week 19 Feb 22	Week 20 Mar 1	Week 21 Mar 8	Week 22 Mar 15	Final Mar 22	
		Dropped: Air Force; Minnesota–Duluth; New Hampshire; Ohio State	Dropped: Northeastern; St. Cloud State	Dropped: Minnesota; Minnesota–Duluth	Dropped: Quinnipiac	Dropped: Wisconsin	Dropped: Boston University	Dropped: Michigan; Princeton	Dropped: Colgate	Dropped: Nebraska–Omaha; Vermont	None	Dropped: New Hampshire; Notre Dame	Dropped: Alaska	Dropped: Quinnipiac	Dropped: Lake Superior State	None	None	Dropped: Massachusetts–Lowell; Michigan	Dropped: Massachusetts	Dropped: Boston University	Dropped: Maine	Dropped: Colorado College; Massachusetts–Lowell; Nebraska–Omaha	Dropped: Boston University	

== See also ==
- 2009–10 NCAA Division I men's ice hockey season
