= Ryan Zapolski =

American ice hockey player (born 1986)

- Zapolski in 2016
- Born: November 11, 1986 (age 40) Erie, Pennsylvania, U.S.
- Height: 6 ft 0 in (183 cm)
- Weight: 185 lb (84 kg; 13 st 3 lb)
- Position: Goaltender
- Caught: Left
- EBEL team Former teams: Vienna Capitals; Kalamazoo Wings; Toledo Walleye; Gwinnett Gladiators; South Carolina Stingrays; Lukko; Jokerit
- National team: United States
- NHL draft: Undrafted
- Playing career: 2011–2021
- Coaching career

Current position
- Conference: Atlantic Hockey

Biographical details
- Education: Mercyhurst University

Coaching career (HC unless noted)
- 2021–2024: Mercyhurst (assistant)
- 2024–2025: Erie Otters (goaltending)

Ryan Zapolski (born November 11, 1986) is an American ice hockey coach and former professional goaltender.

== Early life ==
Zapolski was born and raised in Erie, Pennsylvania. He attended Cathedral Preparatory School in Erie, Pennsylvania.

== Playing career ==
Zapolski attended the Mercyhurst College from 2007 to 2011, where he played NCAA Division I college hockey for the Mercyhurst Lakers men's ice hockey team. His best college season was 2008–09, with a record of 18–5–3, a save percentage of .934, and a goals-against average of 2.22.

Zapolski began his professional career in the ECHL by joining the Florida Everblades, where he appeared in the net for one playoff game near the end of the 2010–11 season. The 2012–13 season was his breakout year, and he was recognized for his outstanding play with the South Carolina Stingrays by being named the ECHL's Rookie of the Year, Goaltender of the Year, and the league's Most Valuable Player.

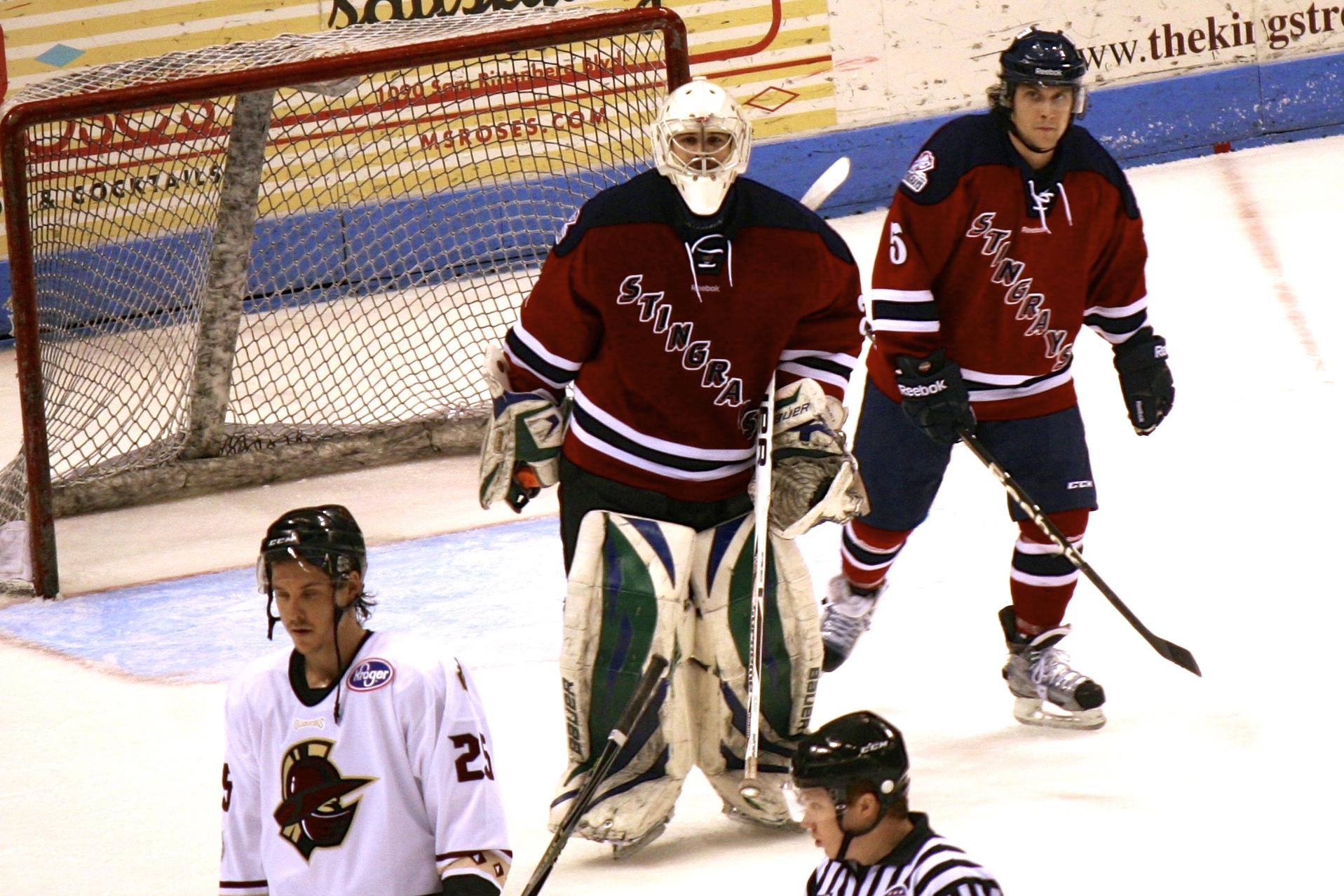
Zapolski as the goaltender at a South Carolina Stingrays game in 2013

In 2013, Zapolski opted to continue his career overseas, signing with Lukko of the Finnish Liiga. He spent three years with the club before signing a two-year deal with Helsinki-based Jokerit, a member of the Kontinental Hockey League (KHL) in April 2016.

After three seasons in the KHL with Jokerit, Zapolski left as a free agent and continued his European career in Austria, agreeing to a one-year contract with the Vienna Capitals of the EBEL on July 9, 2019.

== Awards and honors ==
Award	Year
College
All-Atlantic Hockey Second Team	2008–09
All-Atlantic Hockey Third Team	2009–10
All-Atlantic Hockey Second Team	2010–11
ECHL
First All-Star Team	2012–13
Rookie of the Year	2012–13
Goaltender of the Year	2012–13
Most Valuable Player	2012–13
Redwood Software
MFT Rep of the Year	2023
