= Carl Hudson (ice hockey) =

Canadian ice hockey player

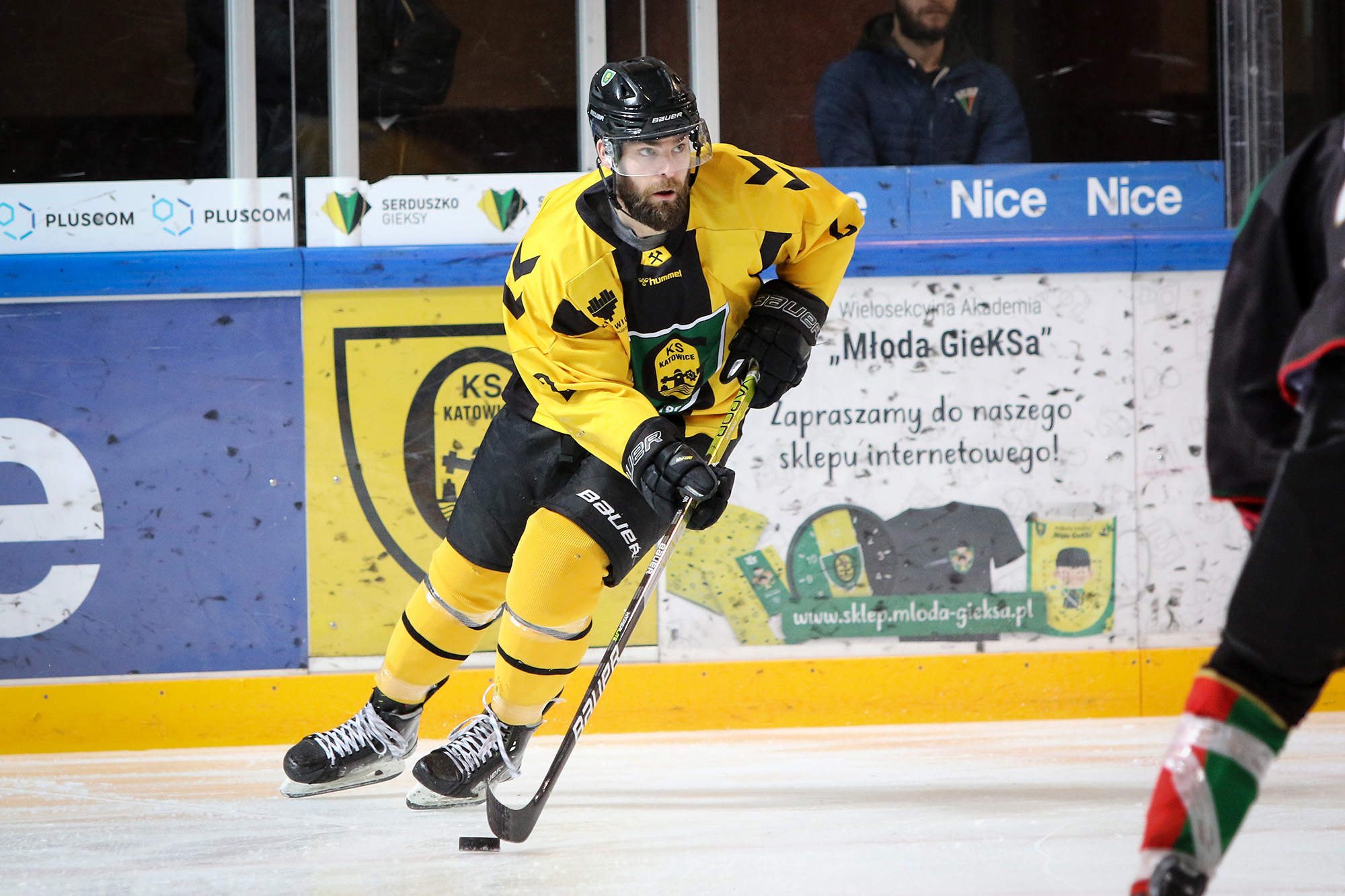
- Carl Hudson playing ice hockey
- Born: January 2, 1986 (age 39); Smooth Rock Falls, Ontario, Canada
- Height: 6 ft 1 in (185 cm)
- Weight: 212 lb (96 kg; 15 st 2 lb)
- Position: Defence
- Shoots: Right
- PHL team Former teams: GKS Katowice; Rochester Americans; Cincinnati Cyclones; Rapid City Rush; ESV Kaufbeuren; Pingouins de Morzine-Avoriaz; Pionniers De Chamonix-Morzine; Cardiff Devils; Milton Keynes Lightning; ETC Crimmitschau
- NHL draft: Undrafted
- Playing career: 2010–present

Carl Hudson (born January 2, 1986) is a Canadian professional ice hockey defenceman. He is currently playing with Polska Hokej Liga side GKS Katowice. Hudson was most recently signed to ETC Crimmitschau in the German DEL2.

== Career ==
Prior to turning professional, Hudson attended Canisius College where he played four seasons with the Canisius Golden Griffins men's ice hockey team in the Atlantic Hockey conference.

On July 9, 2010, Hudson was signed as a free agent by the Florida Panthers to an entry-level contract.

Starting with the 2011–12 season, Hudson played two seasons in Germany with the ESV Kaufbeuren of the 2nd Bundesliga. He joined Pingouins de Morzine-Avoriaz of the French Ligue Magnus prior to the start of the 2013–14 season. He then played two seasons with the Cardiff Devils of the UK EIHL (2014–2015 & 2015–2016), before returning to France with Pionniers De Chamonix-Morzine in 2016.

In June 2017, Hudson returned to the UK to sign for Milton Keynes Lightning ahead of their inaugural season in the Elite Ice Hockey League.

After a season in Milton Keynes, Hudson returned to the German DEL2 to sign for ETC Crimmitschau in 2018.

In 2021, Hudson moved to Poland and signed for GKS Katowice for the 2021–22 season.

== Awards and honours ==
Award	Year
All-Atlantic Hockey Third Team	2008–09
All-Atlantic Hockey Second Team	2009–10
