= 2023–24 Atlantic Hockey season =

- Season: 2023–24
- Conference: Atlantic Hockey
- Division: Division I
- Sport: ice hockey
- Duration: October 7, 2023– March 28, 2024
- Number of teams: 11
- TV partner(s): FloHockey

Regular season
- Season champions: RIT
- Season MVP: Liam McLinskey
- Top scorer: Liam McLinskey

Atlantic Hockey Tournament
- Tournament champions: RIT
- Runners-up: American International
- Tournament MVP: Elijah Gonsalves
- Top scorer: Elijah Gonsalves

NCAA tournament
- Bids: 1
- Record: 0–1
- Best Finish: Regional Semifinal
- Team(s): RIT

The 2023–24 Atlantic Hockey season was the 21st season of play for the Atlantic Hockey Association and took place during the 2023–24 NCAA Division I men's ice hockey season. The season began on October 7, 2023, and concluded on March 28, 2024, with RIT losing in the West Regional Semifinal of the NCAA tournament.

This was the final season for the Atlantic Hockey Association. Shortly after the season, the Association and the women-only College Hockey America finalized their previously announced merger, establishing Atlantic Hockey America.

== Coaches ==
Ryan Soderquist retired after 21 years with Bentley, turning the program over to former Massachusetts Lowell assistant coach, Andy Jones.

Robert Morris restarted its program with Derek Schooley back at the helm. He has been the team's only coach since its inception in 2004.

=== Records ===
Team	Head coach	Season at school	Record at school	Atlantic Hockey record
Air Force	Frank Serratore	27	438–417–98	230–158–68
American International	Eric Lang	8	122–99–24	99–58–19
Army	Brian Riley	20	232–336–90	191–235–81
Bentley	Andy Jones	1	0–0–0	0–0–0
Canisius	Trevor Large	7	88–98–19	68–66–12
Holy Cross	Bill Riga	3	29–44–5	22–26–4
Mercyhurst	Rick Gotkin	36	598–501–103	253–212–63
Niagara	Jason Lammers	7	77–111–21	56–74–21
RIT	Wayne Wilson	25	437–303–78	246–153–54
Robert Morris	Derek Schooley	18	275–275–68	135–104–39
Sacred Heart	C. J. Marottolo	15	174–272–52	140–185–44

== Standings ==
2023–24 Atlantic Hockey Standings
	Conference record										Overall record					
	GP	W	L	T	OW	OL	SW	PTS	GF	GA	GP	W	L	T	GF	GA
#17 RIT †*	26	18	7	1	3	2	0	54	102	64	40	27	11	2	156	96
Holy Cross	26	13	10	3	0	3	1	46	78	62	39	21	14	4	116	93
Sacred Heart	26	14	10	2	2	2	1	45	75	70	36	14	19	3	91	113
Air Force	26	15	10	1	3	0	1	44	88	75	38	18	19	1	115	119
American International	26	12	10	4	1	1	2	42	79	68	40	20	16	4	119	111
Bentley	26	12	12	2	1	2	2	41	69	58	35	16	17	2	95	82
Niagara	26	13	10	3	3	1	1	41	78	79	39	18	18	3	111	122
Canisius	26	10	12	4	2	1	0	33	73	87	37	12	21	4	103	126
Mercyhurst	26	7	15	4	0	1	4	30	77	91	35	9	22	4	98	126
Army	26	8	16	2	0	1	1	28	66	96	35	10	23	2	93	139
Robert Morris	26	7	17	2	0	1	1	25	60	95	39	11	25	3	94	142
Championship: March 23, 2024 † indicates conference regular season champion (DeGregorio Trophy) * indicates conference tournament champion (Riley Trophy); Rankings: USCHO.com Top 20 Poll

=== Regular season record ===
While Atlantic Hockey had four teams posting .500 or better records in non-conference games, any benefit they received was wiped out by the five teams that were .250 or worse. As a whole, the conference performed well against Hockey East, which was one of the two best leagues during the regular season. This, and the collapse of the CCHA, helped move Atlantic Hockey up for the first time in years and the conference did not finish as the lowest-ranked league in Division I hockey.

Team	Big Ten	CCHA	ECAC Hockey	Hockey East	Independent	NCHC	Total
Air Force	1–2–0	0–0–0	0–0–0	0–0–0	2–2–0	0–3–0	3–7–0
American International	1–1–0	0–0–0	0–2–0	2–1–0	1–0–0	0–0–0	4–4–0
Army	0–1–0	0–1–0	0–2–0	2–1–0	0–0–0	0–1–0	2–6–0
Bentley	0–0–0	0–0–0	1–0–0	1–4–0	2–0–0	0–0–0	4–4–0
Canisius	0–2–0	0–0–0	1–3–0	0–0–0	0–0–0	0–2–0	1–7–0
Holy Cross	0–0–0	0–0–0	1–1–0	3–1–1	1–0–0	0–0–0	5–2–1
Mercyhurst	0–4–0	1–1–0	0–0–0	0–0–0	0–0–0	1–1–0	2–6–0
Niagara	0–0–0	0–0–0	1–1–0	0–0–0	0–0–0	1–5–0	2–6–0
RIT	1–0–0	1–0–0	1–1–1	1–2–0	0–0–0	0–0–0	4–3–1
Robert Morris	0–2–0	1–1–0	0–0–0	0–0–0	2–3–1	0–0–0	3–6–1
Sacred Heart	0–0–0	0–0–0	0–4–1	0–2–0	0–1–0	0–0–0	0–7–1
Overall	3–12–0	3–3–0	5–14–2	9–11–1	8–6–1	2–12–0	30–58–4

== Statistics ==
=== Leading scorers ===
GP = Games played; G = Goals; A = Assists; Pts = Points; PIM = Penalty minutes

Player	Class	Team	GP	G	A	Pts	PIM
Liam McLinskey	Junior	Holy Cross	26	11	20	31	28
Cody Laskosky	Senior	RIT	26	11	19	30	8
Will Gavin	Senior	Air Force	26	15	14	29	12
Chris Hedden	Sophomore	Air Force	26	5	23	28	29
Matteo Giampa	Freshman	Canisius	26	13	14	27	6
Carter Wilkie	Junior	RIT	26	11	16	27	22
John Jaworski	Senior	Sacred Heart	26	11	13	24	18
Garrett Dahm	Junior	Mercyhurst	26	6	18	24	23
Gianfranco Cassaro	Graduate	RIT	26	9	14	23	22
Elijah Gonsalves	Graduate	RIT	22	12	10	22	22
Jack Ricketts	Senior	Holy Cross	26	12	10	22	50
Matthew Wilde	Freshman	RIT	26	11	11	22	8
Aiden Hansen-Bukata	Senior	RIT	24	3	19	22	24

=== Leading goaltenders ===
Minimum 1/3 of team's minutes played in conference games.
GP = Games played; Min = Minutes played; W = Wins; L = Losses; T = Ties; GA = Goals against; SO = Shutouts; SV% = Save percentage; GAA = Goals against average

Player	Class	Team	GP	Min	W	L	T	GA	SO	SV%	GAA
Nicholas Grabko	Senior	Bentley	11	610:35	4	6	1	21	2	.919	2.06
Jason Grande	Senior	Holy Cross	11	654:42	6	4	1	24	0	.926	2.20
Nils Wallström	Freshman	American International	20	1182:01	12	6	2	44	1	.916	2.23
Connor Hasley	Sophomore	Bentley	16	946:47	8	6	1	15	2	.901	2.28
Thomas Gale	Junior	Holy Cross	16	917:21	7	6	2	35	2	.922	2.29

== Conference tournament ==
Teams are reseeded for the semifinals

First Round; March 2
6	Bentley	3
11	Robert Morris	4*
7	Niagara	4
10	Army	1
8	Canisius	5
9	Mercyhurst	2

Quarterfinals; March 8–10
1	RIT	7	5	-
11	Robert Morris	0	1	-
2	Holy Cross	4	2**	-
8	Canisius	3	1	-
3	Sacred Heart	3	1	-
7	Niagara	6	5	-
4	Air Force	1	2	-
5	American International	3	3*	-

Semifinals; March 15–17
1	RIT	4	5	-
7	Niagara	1	2	-
2	Holy Cross	5	0	1
5	American International	2	3	3

Championship; March 23
1	RIT	5
5	American International	2

Note: * denotes overtime period(s)

== NCAA tournament ==
March 28, 2024; 4:00 pm	(1) Boston University	6–3 (2–1, 2–1, 2–1)	(4) RIT	Denny Sanford Premier Center; Attendance: 5,691

Game reference

Mathieu Caron
Goalies
Tommy Scarfone
Referees:
Bruce Vida
Brady Johnson
Linesmen:
Tyler Landman
Nathan Voll

(M. Celebrini, Kaplan) Lane Hutson (14) – 11:56	1–0
(unassisted) Ryan Greene (12) – 13:01	2–0
	2–1	15:40 – PP – Elijah Gonsalves (20) (Wilde, Cassaro)
(L. Hutson, Kaplan) Sam Stevens (9) – 28:16	3–1
	3–2	35:20 – Gianfranco Cassaro (18) (Nicholson)
(Peterson, Zabaneh) Macklin Celebrini (32) – GW – 37:01	4–2
(Lachance, Willander) Jack Harvey (6) – 41:29	5–2
(Willander, Zabaneh) Dylan Peterson (8) – EN – 55:46	6–2
	6–3	59:03 – Cody Laskosky (4) (Catalano, Blom)

6 min
Penalties
6 min
33
Shots
31

== Rankings ==
=== USCHO ===
Team	Pre	1	2	3	4	5	6	7	8	9	10	12	13	14	15	16	17	18	19	20	21	22	23	24	Final
Air Force	NR	NR	NR	NR	NR	NR	NR	NR	NR	NR	NR	NR	NR	NR	NR	NR	NR	NR	NR	NR	NR	NR	NR	NR	NR
American International	NR	NR	NR	NR	NR	NR	NR	NR	NR	NR	NR	NR	NR	NR	NR	NR	NR	NR	NR	NR	NR	NR	NR	NR	NR
Army	NR	NR	NR	NR	NR	NR	NR	NR	NR	NR	NR	NR	NR	NR	NR	NR	NR	NR	NR	NR	NR	NR	NR	NR	NR
Bentley	NR	NR	NR	NR	NR	NR	NR	NR	NR	NR	NR	NR	NR	NR	NR	NR	NR	NR	NR	NR	NR	NR	NR	NR	NR
Canisius	NR	NR	NR	NR	NR	NR	NR	NR	NR	NR	NR	NR	NR	NR	NR	NR	NR	NR	NR	NR	NR	NR	NR	NR	NR
Holy Cross	NR	NR	NR	NR	NR	NR	NR	NR	NR	NR	NR	NR	NR	NR	NR	NR	NR	NR	NR	NR	NR	NR	NR	NR	NR
Mercyhurst	NR	NR	NR	NR	NR	NR	NR	NR	NR	NR	NR	NR	NR	NR	NR	NR	NR	NR	NR	NR	NR	NR	NR	NR	NR
Niagara	NR	NR	NR	NR	NR	NR	NR	NR	NR	NR	NR	NR	NR	NR	NR	NR	NR	NR	NR	NR	NR	NR	NR	NR	NR
RIT	NR	NR	NR	NR	NR	20	20	20	19	19	18	18	19	20	19	19	20	20	20	19	19	19	18	17	17
Robert Morris	NR	NR	NR	NR	NR	NR	NR	NR	NR	NR	NR	NR	NR	NR	NR	NR	NR	NR	NR	NR	NR	NR	NR	NR	NR
Sacred Heart	NR	NR	NR	NR	NR	NR	NR	NR	NR	NR	NR	NR	NR	NR	NR	NR	NR	NR	NR	NR	NR	NR	NR	NR	NR

=== USA Hockey ===
Team	Pre	1	2	3	4	5	6	7	8	9	10	11	13	14	15	16	17	18	19	20	21	22	23	24	25	Final
Air Force	NR	NR	NR	NR	NR	NR	NR	NR	NR	NR	NR	NR	NR	NR	NR	NR	NR	NR	NR	NR	NR	NR	NR	NR	NR	NR
American International	NR	NR	NR	NR	NR	NR	NR	NR	NR	NR	NR	NR	NR	NR	NR	NR	NR	NR	NR	NR	NR	NR	NR	NR	NR	NR
Army	NR	NR	NR	NR	NR	NR	NR	NR	NR	NR	NR	NR	NR	NR	NR	NR	NR	NR	NR	NR	NR	NR	NR	NR	NR	NR
Bentley	NR	NR	NR	NR	NR	NR	NR	NR	NR	NR	NR	NR	NR	NR	NR	NR	NR	NR	NR	NR	NR	NR	NR	NR	NR	NR
Canisius	NR	NR	NR	NR	NR	NR	NR	NR	NR	NR	NR	NR	NR	NR	NR	NR	NR	NR	NR	NR	NR	NR	NR	NR	NR	NR
Holy Cross	NR	NR	NR	NR	NR	NR	NR	NR	NR	NR	NR	NR	NR	NR	NR	NR	NR	NR	NR	NR	NR	NR	NR	NR	NR	NR
Mercyhurst	NR	NR	NR	NR	NR	NR	NR	NR	NR	NR	NR	NR	NR	NR	NR	NR	NR	NR	NR	NR	NR	NR	NR	NR	NR	NR
Niagara	NR	NR	NR	NR	NR	NR	NR	NR	NR	NR	NR	NR	NR	NR	NR	NR	NR	NR	NR	NR	NR	NR	NR	NR	NR	NR
RIT	NR	NR	NR	NR	NR	NR	NR	NR	19	19	19	19	20	20	20	NR	20	NR	NR	20	20	19	19	18	17	17
Robert Morris	NR	NR	NR	NR	NR	NR	NR	NR	NR	NR	NR	NR	NR	NR	NR	NR	NR	NR	NR	NR	NR	NR	NR	NR	NR	NR
Sacred Heart	NR	NR	NR	NR	NR	NR	NR	NR	NR	NR	NR	NR	NR	NR	NR	NR	NR	NR	NR	NR	NR	NR	NR	NR	NR	NR

=== Pairwise ===
Team	1	2	3	4	5	6	7	8	9	10	12	13	14	15	16	17	18	19	20	21	22	23	Final
Air Force	19	7	32	38	49	45	41	45	47	50	54	46	43	38	40	43	45	43	43	42	44	44	45
American International	32	39	26	26	39	24	18	17	19	21	22	25	29	27	28	30	31	32	33	32	29	25	27
Army	32	43	33	56	63	64	63	54	56	58	50	55	55	58	58	58	58	56	56	57	56	56	56
Bentley	30	53	37	43	40	28	39	40	37	40	40	45	47	33	44	45	42	44	42	44	43	43	44
Canisius	32	50	57	59	48	60	60	50	53	57	57	58	57	57	56	59	59	57	58	57	58	58	58
Holy Cross	1	1	11	23	33	46	36	32	37	35	36	34	33	33	30	27	27	23	25	26	24	29	28
Mercyhurst	32	40	54	55	59	55	54	52	48	51	56	52	53	57	61	62	62	60	59	61	59	59	59
Niagara	32	56	56	60	56	61	56	53	51	60	59	58	56	47	48	48	43	46	46	45	39	42	42
RIT	32	24	53	29	27	39	33	21	20	16	17	19	21	23	23	23	22	25	22	23	21	21	21
Robert Morris	32	34	42	49	60	59	62	63	63	63	63	62	62	63	63	61	60	61	61	59	60	60	60
Sacred Heart	32	55	55	53	57	52	50	38	30	40	43	42	44	46	51	48	48	49	49	50	53	53	53

Note: teams ranked in the top-10 automatically qualify for the NCAA tournament. Teams ranked 11-16 can qualify based upon conference tournament results.

== Awards ==
=== NCAA ===
Award	Recipient
Derek Hines Unsung Hero Award	Luke Robinson, Air Force
AHCA All-American Teams
East Second Team	Position
Gianfranco Cassaro, RIT	D
Liam McLinskey, Holy Cross	F

=== Atlantic Hockey ===
Award		Recipient
Player of the Year		Liam McLinskey, Holy Cross
Goaltender of the Year		Tommy Scarfone, RIT
Rookie of the Year		Matteo Giampa, Canisius
Best Defensive Forward		Austin Schwartz, Air Force
Best Defenseman		Brian Kramer, American International
Individual Sportsmanship Award		Braeden Tuck, Sacred Heart
Team Sportsmanship Award		Sacred Heart
Regular Season Scoring Trophy		Liam McLinskey, Holy Cross
Regular Season Goaltending Award		Jason Grande, Holy Cross
Coach of the Year		Wayne Wilson, RIT
Tournament MVP		Elijah Gonsalves, RIT
All-Atlantic Hockey Teams
First Team	Position	Second Team
Tommy Scarfone, RIT	G	Jason Grande, Holy Cross
Gianfranco Cassaro, RIT	D	Chris Hedden, Air Force
Brian Kramer, American International	D	Aiden Hansen-Bukata, RIT
Liam McLinskey, Holy Cross	F	Matteo Giampa, Canisius
Carter Wilkie, RIT	F	Jack Ricketts, Holy Cross
Will Gavin, Air Force	F	Joey Baez, Army
Cody Laskosky, RIT	F	
Third Team	Position	Rookie Team
Owen Say, Mercyhurst	G	Nils Wallström, American International
Luke Rowe, Air Force	D	Mac Gadowsky, Army
Nick Bochen, Bentley	D	Trent Sambrook, Mercyhurst
Ethan Leyh, Bentley	F	Matteo Giampa, Canisius
John Jaworski, Sacred Heart	F	Boris Skalos, Mercyhurst
Elijah Gonsalves, RIT	F	Jack Stockfish, Holy Cross
Atlantic Hockey All-Tournament Team
Tommy Scarfone, RIT	G	
Gianfranco Cassaro, RIT	D	
Nico Somerville, American International	D	
Elijah Gonsalves, RIT	F	
Tyler Fukakusa, RIT	F	
Jordan Biro, American International	F	

== 2024 NHL entry draft ==
Round	Pick	Player	College	NHL team
4	106	Trevor Hoskin ^{†}	Niagara	Calgary Flames

† incoming freshman
