= 2023–24 RIT Tigers men's ice hockey season =

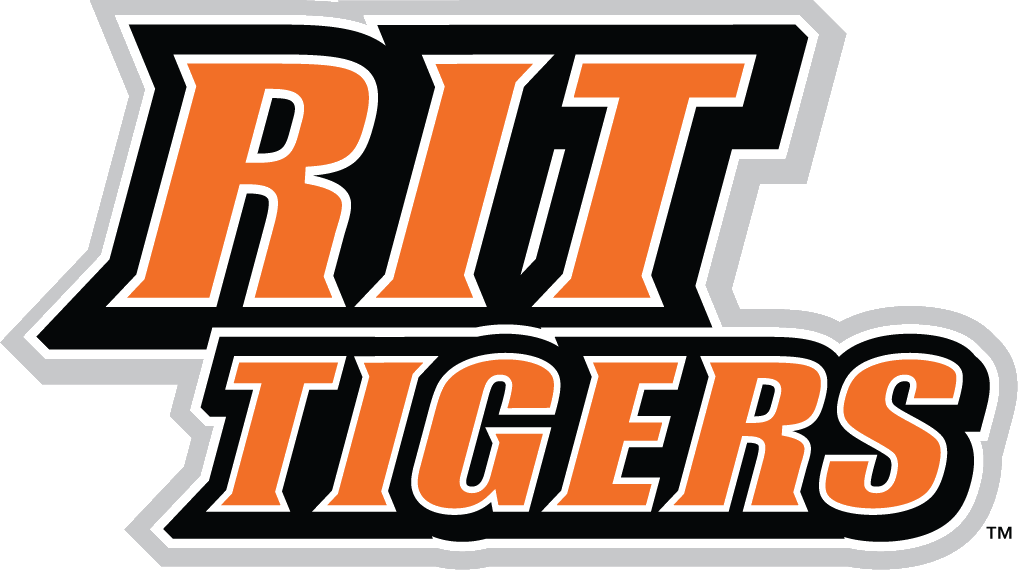

Atlantic Hockey, Champion Atlantic Hockey Tournament, Champion NCAA Tournament, Regional Semifinal
- Conference: 1st Atlantic Hockey
- Home ice: Gene Polisseni Center

Rankings
- USCHO: #17
- USA Hockey: #17

Record
- Overall: 27–11–2
- Conference: 18–7–1
- Home: 17–5–1
- Road: 8–4–1
- Neutral: 2–2–0

Coaches and captains
- Head coach: Wayne Wilson
- Assistant coaches: Brian Hills; David Insalaco
- Captain: Caleb Moretz
- Alternate captains: Gianfranco Cassaro; Elijah Gonsalves; Aiden Hansen-Bukata; Cody Laskosky; Carter Wilkie

The 2023–24 RIT Tigers men's ice hockey season was the 60th season of play for the program, the 19th at the Division I level and the 18th in Atlantic Hockey. The Tigers represented the Rochester Institute of Technology, played their home games at the Gene Polisseni Center and were coached by Wayne Wilson in his 25th season. Forward Caleb Moretz was named team captain entering the season.

== Season ==
After a disappointing loss to end the previous season, the vast majority of RIT's players returned. The only major loss to the lineup was Kobe Walker, who had finished fifth in scoring, but the Tigers brought in several new recruits to shore up the offense. While the outlook appeared good for the team, putting their plans into practice was another matter entirely. The Tigers started the season at St. Lawrence and they were doomed by an issue that had plagued them all of the previous season: taking too many penalties. RIT took six minor penalties in their opening game and though they only allowed one goal during the disadvantages, that marker was the game-winner in a 1-goal game. Additionally, the team was unable to get to their offense while on the penalty kill and they spent much of the waning moments of the match defending rather than trying to get a tying goal.

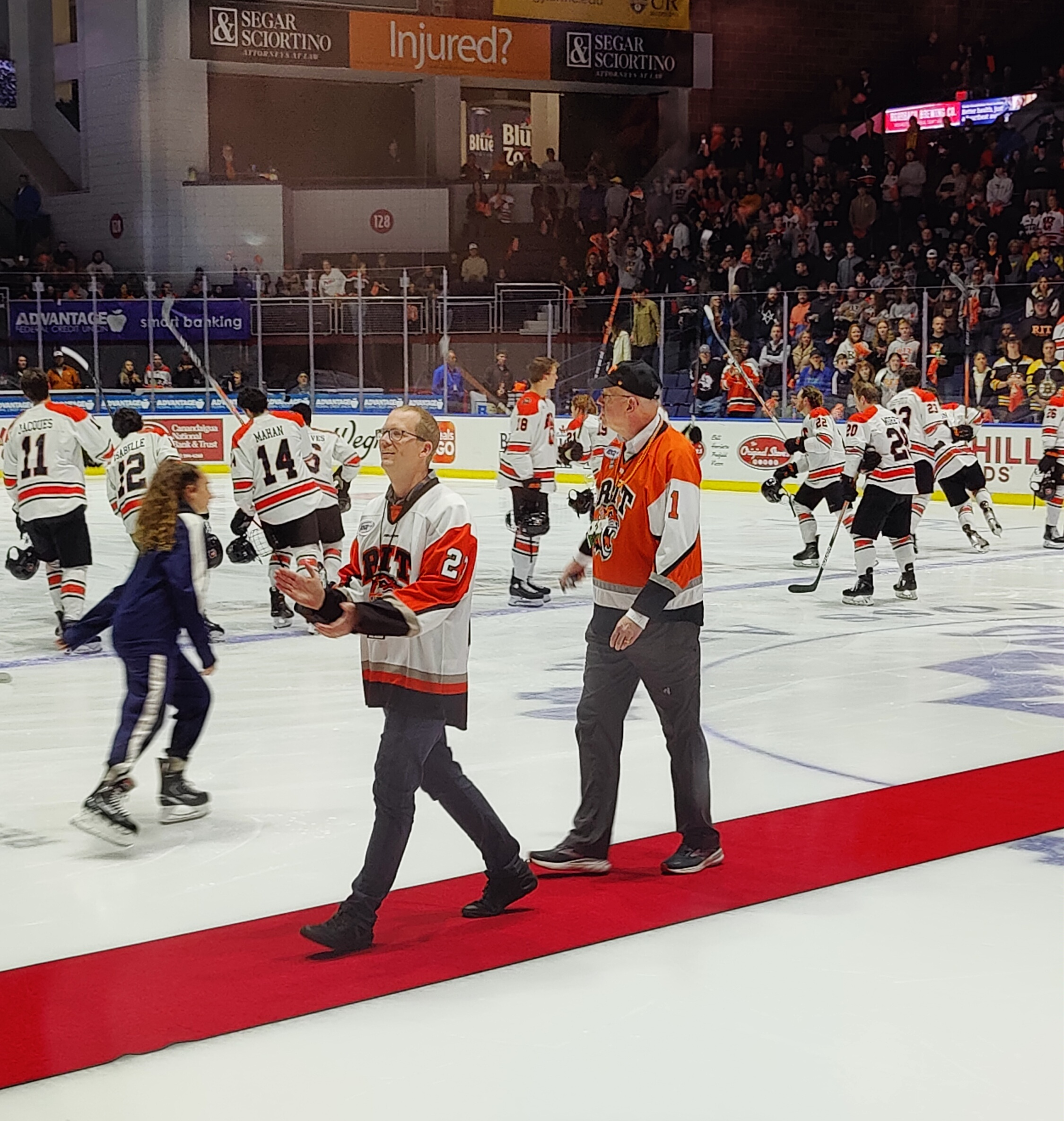
Author and internet personality Hank Green was a special guest for the 2023 Homecoming Game, participating in the ceremonial puck drop with RIT president David Munson

After that inauspicious start, the team hosted Notre Dame at the Blue Cross Arena for their homecoming game. In front of a sellout crowd of over 10,000, RIT played a staunch defensive game and shutout the Irish. While the team couldn't help itself and took 27 minutes in penalties, they were able to hold off a lackluster power play and earn a very important win for the team's postseason hopes. Tommy Scarfone was the hero of the match, stopping all 36 shots that were sent his way. After their first win, the team began its conference schedule early and quickly jumped to the top of the Atlantic Hockey standings. Scarfone continued to play well in goal and was named the national goaltender of the month for October by the Hockey Commissioners Association. He was not the only reason for the Tigers' success, however, as the team had raised its already potent offense to another level. While several of last year's point leaders got back into the swing of things swiftly, the team received a boots from the return of Elijah Gonsalves after he was forced to sit out two weeks with a lower body injury. The team was also beginning to see two of its new arrivals contribute offensively with Matthew Wilde and Tyler Fukakusa getting up to speed by Thanksgiving.

During the holiday, RIT was given an unexpected opportunity when their opponent, New Hampshire arrived in town with the #12 ranking. Not only was it a chance to prove their mettle against a good team but both games were carried by NESN and could help to raise the visibility of the program. The first match was a bit of a mixed bag for the Tigers, with penalties being called left and right but the RIT power play proved to be the difference. The home team went 3 for 7 on the man-advantage, including twice on a 5-minute major, to win the match. The second saw fewer penalties but just as many minutes with both sides being given a match penalty in the game. This time it was RIT's turn to suffer for their infractions and New Hampshire scored twice on their major advantage. The Tigers were still able to push the game into overtime after tying the game with 5 seconds to play but they were unable to stop the Wildcats from winning the game in overtime. The split series gave the Tigers a huge boost to their rankings and saw them just up into the top third of the PairWise. Two weeks later, with a little help from teams ahead of them losing, RIT entered the winter break in the top 16 and in line for a potential at large bid, a rarity for Atlantic Hockey.

After Christmas the team reconvened for the Ledyard Bank Classic and were presented with yet another tough test. Their semifinal opponent was #8 Maine and even a close loss to the Black Bears could help the Tigers' cause. Unfortunately, penalties torpedoed the team's chances and three infractions in the second (one being a match penalty for grabbing a face mask) led to total domination by Maine in the second half. While RIT didn't surrender a power play marker, the Black Bears outshot the Tigers 30 to 7 in the final 40 minutes. The team recovered to win the consolation game, albeit with seven more penalties, but weren't punished too harshly in the national rankings, falling just one spot. After a solid weekend against a pair of ECAC Hockey teams, RIT finished its non-conference slate with a winning record. Though they had beaten New Hampshire, that only countered the opening loss to St. Lawrence and gave the Tigers effective a neutral mark against the other leagues. If RIT hoped to remain in the top-15 and be in line for an at-large bid by the end of the season they could not afford many losses in the second half of their season. Unfortunately, that's exactly what happened when they resumed conference play.

RIT's offense faltered a bit in early January and scored 4 goals over a 3-game span. Despite firing 42 shots against Niagara the team lost 1–3. Due to a snowstorm, the next game against Canisius was postponed for three days. When the team got onto the ice they continued their recent barrage, getting 46 shots on goal but still fell in overtime. The back-to-back losses dropped the team into the low-20s and, with no games against good teams remaining, the Tigers had almost no chance to recover their former position. Even after going undefeated over the next three weeks, RIT could only climb up one spot in the rankings. When the Tigers split successive weekends in the middle of February, it made it all but impossible for the team to get an at large bid and they found themselves in the same position that they were in 2023.

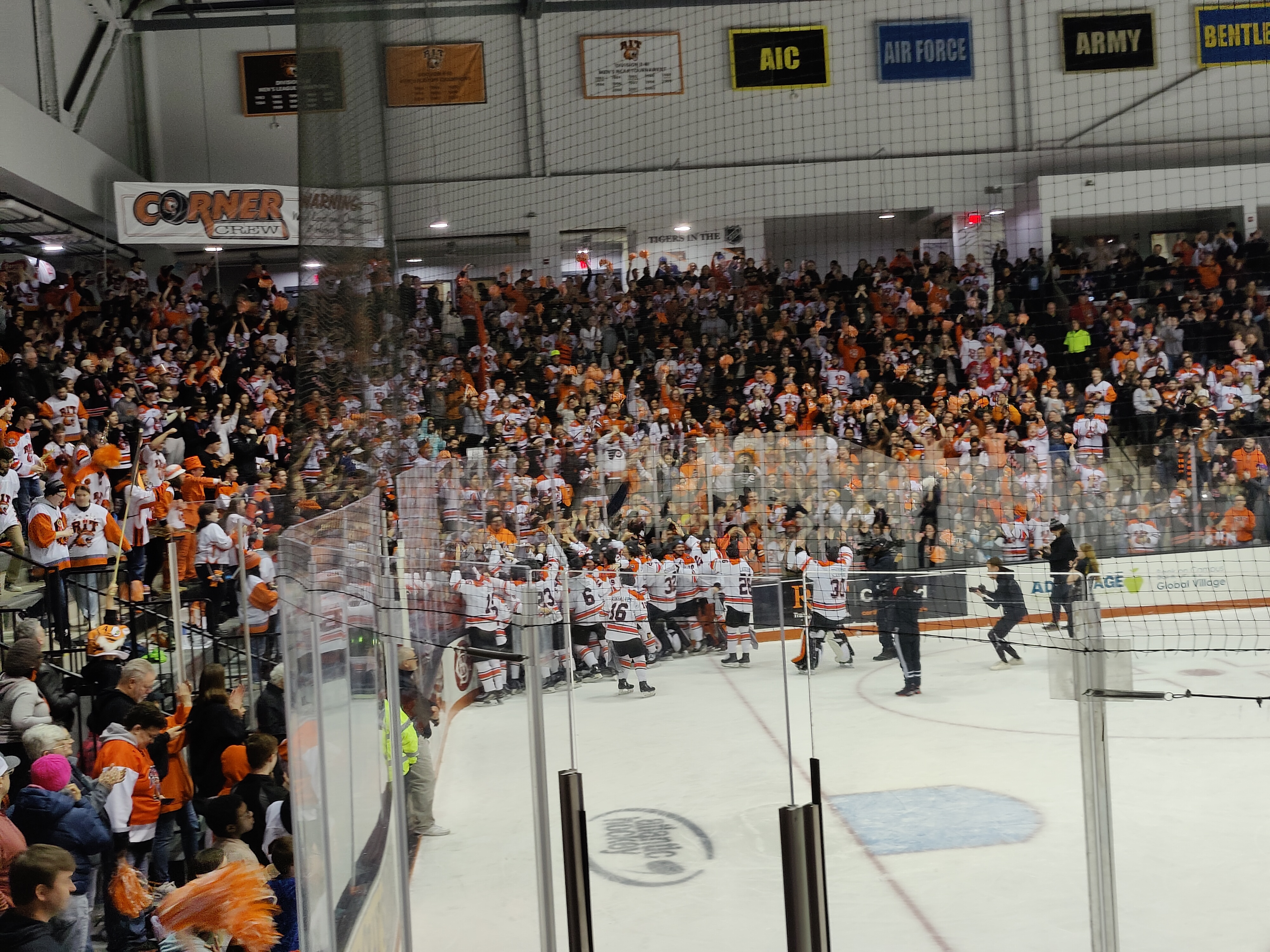
RIT celebrates after winning the AHA Championship Game

When the regular season ended, RIT was clearly the best team in their conference. Not only had the Tigers won the DeGregorio Trophy by 8 points but they also possessed the #1 offense and #3 defense in Atlantic Hockey. Six of the top thirteen scorers were on the Tigers and they were the only conference member in the national polls. However, because their strength of schedule was far below other teams vying for the NCAA tournament, RIT could only reach the national postseason by winning their conference championship. As part of their reward for winning the regular season title, RIT received a bye into the quarterfinal round. The other benefit was playing the lowest available seed when the did begin their postseason and, by a twist of fate, the Tigers opened with a home stand against last-place Robert Morris. The Colonials proved to be no match for RIT and the home team easily swept the RMU off the ice. The next weekend brought another underdog to Rochester and, though they received a tougher challenge from Niagara, RIT was able to complete a second sweep thanks in large part to their penalty kill and goaltender. In the championship match, only American International stood in the Tiger's way and the two fought a tight-checking game. After exchanging leads in the first, The second period began with both tied at two goals apiece. Wilde swiftly scored his 18th of the season on the power play and the Tigers then had to rely on the heroics of Scarfone to carry them the rest of the way. RIT was called for three minor penalties afterwards but the defense held and the team retained their 1-goal lead for the final 38 minutes. As the final buzzer was approaching, AIC pulled their goaltender and the Tigers popped in two empty-net markers to seal the game and send them back to the national tournament for the first time in eight years.

When the NCAA field was announced, RIT found itself in an unusual position for an Atlantic Hockey team and they were not set against the #1 overall seed. However, despite this the Tigers still faced an daunting task as they were placed opposite the #2 team in the nation, Boston University. RIT was sent to the western regional, held in Sioux Falls, South Dakota and played in front of a not-quite hostile crowd. When play began the Tigers were skating fast and matched the speed of the Terriers. They ended up getting the lion's share of chances in the first 10 minutes but, unfortunately, none of their shots found the target. In the back half of the opening period, RIT witnessed the talent of BU and they suddenly found themselves down by a pair. Elijah Gonsalves managed to cut the lead in half with a power play marker before the end of the period but the Tigers still had to find a way to stop the Terrier's attack. Boston University regain the 2-goal edge in the second and it took seemingly everything the Tigers had to match the goal seven minutes later. Conversely, the Terriers were playing loose and in less than two minutes they got their third 2-goal lead of the match. A further goal from BU at the start of the third made RIT's chances dwindle further and seemed to take the urgency out of their attack. To that point the Tigers had played well in the game but they just did not have the horses to match Boston University who sported 14 NHL draft picks and likely #1 selection in the upcoming draft. After surrendering an empty net goal in the later stages of the period, Cody Laskosky was able to score the final goal of the season for the Tigers but that didn't affect the outcome.

RIT had put together one of the best seasons the team had seen, falling one shy of the program record with 27 wins while finishing as the #6 offense in the country with 3.9 goals per game.

== Departures ==
Player	Position	Nationality	Cause
Spencer Berry	Defenseman	Canada	Graduation (signed with Kassel Huskies)
Calvon Boots	Defenseman	United States	Graduation (retired)
Matthew Kellenberger	Defenseman	Canada	Graduation (signed with EHC Kloten)
Kolby Matthews	Goaltender	Canada	Graduate transfer to Simon Fraser
Andrew Petrucci	Forward	Canada	Graduation (retired)
Colton Trumbla	Forward	Canada	Graduation (retired)
Kobe Walker	Forward	Canada	Graduation (signed with Guildford Flames)

== Recruiting ==
Player	Position	Nationality	Age	Notes
Christian Catalano	Defenseman	Canada	20	Mississauga, ON
Tyler Fukakusa	Forward	Canada	21	Toronto, ON
Luke Lush	Goaltender	Canada	25	Sherwood Park, AB; graduate transfer from Sacred Heart
Kevin Scott	Defenseman	United States	20	Ashburn, VA
Crossley Stewart	Defenseman	Canada	21	Prince Rupert, BC
Matthew Wilde	Forward	Canada	21	Mississauga, ON

== Roster ==
As of September 15, 2023.

No.	Nat.	Player	Class	Pos	Height	Weight	DoB	Hometown	Previous team	NHL rights
4	(Canada)	Dimitri Mikrogiannakis	Senior	D	6' 1" (1.85 m)	200 lb (91 kg)	1999-09-20	Aurora, Ontario	Cowichan Valley Capitals (BCHL)	—
5	(Sweden)	Gustav Blom	Sophomore	F	6' 0" (1.83 m)	180 lb (82 kg)	2001-01-30	Stockholm, Sweden	New Mexico Ice Wolves (USHL)	—
6	(Canada)	Matthew Wilde	Freshman	D	6' 2" (1.88 m)	198 lb (90 kg)	2002-04-30	Mississauga, Ontario	Toronto Jr. Canadiens (OJHL)	—
7	(Canada)	Tanner Andrew	Junior	F	5' 9" (1.75 m)	170 lb (77 kg)	2000-02-11	Virden, Manitoba	Chilliwack Chiefs (BCHL)	—
8	(Canada)	Evan Miller	Junior	F	5' 11" (1.8 m)	175 lb (79 kg)	2000-03-07	Niagara-on-the-Lake, Ontario	Wellington Dukes (OJHL)	—
9	(Canada)	Tyler Fukakusa	Freshman	F	5' 11" (1.8 m)	180 lb (82 kg)	1998-11-30	Toronto, Ontario	Toronto Jr. Canadiens (OJHL)	—
10	(Canada)	Gianfranco Cassaro (A)	Graduate	D	5' 11" (1.8 m)	186 lb (84 kg)	1999-03-30	Nobleton, Ontario	Massachusetts (HEA)	—
11	(Canada)	Philippe Jacques	Sophomore	F	6' 4" (1.93 m)	200 lb (91 kg)	2002-10-29	Quebec City, Quebec	Ottawa Jr. Senators (CCHL)	—
12	(Canada)	Simon Isabelle	Sophomore	F	5' 10" (1.78 m)	170 lb (77 kg)	2001-01-12	Whitehorse, Yukon	Ottawa Jr. Senators (CCHL)	—
14	(Canada)	Tyler Mahan	Sophomore	F	6' 0" (1.83 m)	190 lb (86 kg)	2001-12-14	Calgary, Alberta	Whitecourt Wolverines (AJHL)	—
15	(Canada)	Adam Jeffery	Sophomore	F	6' 5" (1.96 m)	200 lb (91 kg)	2001-05-08	Leamington, Ontario	Leamington Flyers (GOJHL)	—
16	(Canada)	Elijah Gonsalves (A)	Graduate	F	5' 9" (1.75 m)	175 lb (79 kg)	2000-03-08	Scarborough, Ontario	Wellington Dukes (OJHL)	—
18	(United States)	Kevin Scott	Freshman	D	6' 3" (1.91 m)	215 lb (98 kg)	2003-04-30	Ashburn, Virginia	Fargo Force (USHL)	—
19	(Canada)	Christian Catalano	Freshman	F	6' 1" (1.85 m)	190 lb (86 kg)	2003-05-23	Mississauga, Ontario	Maryland Black Bears (NAHL)	—
20	(United States)	Caleb Moretz (C)	Graduate	F	5' 10" (1.78 m)	180 lb (82 kg)	1998-07-14	Fairbanks, Alaska	Flin Flon Bombers (SJHL)	—
21	(Canada)	Carter Wilkie (A)	Junior	F	6' 1" (1.85 m)	190 lb (86 kg)	2000-04-03	Calgary, Alberta	West Kelowna Warriors (BCHL)	—
22	(Canada)	Grady Hobbs	Junior	F	5' 8" (1.73 m)	177 lb (80 kg)	2000-03-18	Deloraine, Manitoba	Dauphin Kings (MJHL)	—
23	(Canada)	Aiden Hansen-Bukata (A)	Senior	D	6' 0" (1.83 m)	179 lb (81 kg)	1999-06-29	Delta, British Columbia	Nanaimo Clippers (BCHL)	—
24	(Canada)	Ryan Nicholson	Graduate	D	6' 3" (1.91 m)	196 lb (89 kg)	1999-01-13	Mississauga, Ontario	Oakville Blades (OJHL)	—
25	(Canada)	Doug Scott	Junior	D	5' 10" (1.78 m)	190 lb (86 kg)	2000-04-16	North Vancouver, British Columbia	Humboldt Broncos (SJHL)	—
26	(Canada)	Cody Laskosky (A)	Senior	F	5' 11" (1.8 m)	180 lb (82 kg)	1999-06-21	New Norway, Alberta	Camrose Kodiaks (AJHL)	—
27	(Canada)	Crossley Stewart	Freshman	D	6' 3" (1.91 m)	190 lb (86 kg)	2002-05-30	Prince Rupert, British Columbia	Burlington Cougars (OJHL)	—
28	(Canada)	Xavier Lapointe	Sophomore	D	6' 0" (1.83 m)	190 lb (86 kg)	2002-01-26	Quebec City, Quebec	Flin Flon Bombers (SJHL)	—
30	(Canada)	Tommy Scarfone	Junior	G	6' 0" (1.83 m)	170 lb (77 kg)	2000-11-19	Montreal, Quebec	Surrey Eagles (BCHL)	—
32	(Canada)	Daniel Chenard	Senior	G	6' 0" (1.83 m)	168 lb (76 kg)	1999-10-03	Waterloo, Ontario	Wenatchee Wild (BCHL)	—
33	(Canada)	Luke Lush	Graduate	G	6' 3" (1.91 m)	205 lb (93 kg)	1998-02-15	Sherwood Park, Alberta	Sacred Heart (AHA)	—

== Standings ==
2023–24 Atlantic Hockey Standings
	Conference record										Overall record					
	GP	W	L	T	OW	OL	SW	PTS	GF	GA	GP	W	L	T	GF	GA
#17 RIT †*	26	18	7	1	3	2	0	54	102	64	40	27	11	2	156	96
Holy Cross	26	13	10	3	0	3	1	46	78	62	39	21	14	4	116	93
Sacred Heart	26	14	10	2	2	2	1	45	75	70	36	14	19	3	91	113
Air Force	26	15	10	1	3	0	1	44	88	75	38	18	19	1	115	119
American International	26	12	10	4	1	1	2	42	79	68	40	20	16	4	119	111
Bentley	26	12	12	2	1	2	2	41	69	58	35	16	17	2	95	82
Niagara	26	13	10	3	3	1	1	41	78	79	39	18	18	3	111	122
Canisius	26	10	12	4	2	1	0	33	73	87	37	12	21	4	103	126
Mercyhurst	26	7	15	4	0	1	4	30	77	91	35	9	22	4	98	126
Army	26	8	16	2	0	1	1	28	66	96	35	10	23	2	93	139
Robert Morris	26	7	17	2	0	1	1	25	60	95	39	11	25	3	94	142
Championship: March 23, 2024 † indicates conference regular season champion (DeGregorio Trophy) * indicates conference tournament champion (Riley Trophy); Rankings: USCHO.com Top 20 Poll

== Schedule and results ==
Date	Time	Opponent^{#}	Rank^{#}	Site	TV	Decision	Result	Attendance	Record
Regular Season
October 7	6:05 pm	at St. Lawrence*		Appleton Arena • Canton, New York	ESPN+	Scarfone	L 3–4	2,053	0–1–0
October 9	5:00 pm	Guelph*		Gene Polisseni Center • Henrietta, New York (Exhibition)	FloHockey	Lush	W 6–4	988	
October 14	7:05 pm	vs. Notre Dame*		Blue Cross Arena • Rochester, New York	FloHockey	Scarfone	W 3–0	10,556	1–1–0
October 20	7:05 pm	Sacred Heart		Gene Polisseni Center • Henrietta, New York	FloHockey	Scarfone	W 4–2	2,929	2–1–0 (1–0–0)
October 21	7:05 pm	Sacred Heart		Gene Polisseni Center • Henrietta, New York	FloHockey	Lush	L 2–5	2,764	2–2–0 (1–1–0)
October 27	7:05 pm	at Holy Cross		Hart Center • Worcester, Massachusetts	FloHockey	Scarfone	W 3–2 ^{OT}	923	3–2–0 (2–1–0)
October 28	7:05 pm	at Holy Cross		Hart Center • Worcester, Massachusetts	FloHockey	Scarfone	W 3–2	979	4–2–0 (3–1–0)
November 3	7:05 pm	at Army		Tate Rink • West Point, New York	FloHockey	Scarfone	W 4–2	1,795	5–2–0 (4–1–0)
November 4	4:05 pm	at Army		Tate Rink • West Point, New York	FloHockey	Scarfone	W 5–3	1,638	6–2–0 (5–1–0)
November 10	7:05 pm	Mercyhurst	#20	Gene Polisseni Center • Henrietta, New York	FloHockey	Scarfone	W 5–2	3,925	7–2–0 (6–1–0)
November 11	5:05 pm	Mercyhurst	#20	Gene Polisseni Center • Henrietta, New York	FloHockey	Scarfone	L 0–2	3,388	7–3–0 (6–2–0)
November 24	7:05 pm	#12 New Hampshire*	#20	Gene Polisseni Center • Henrietta, New York	FloHockey, NESN	Scarfone	W 5–4	2,365	8–3–0
November 25	5:05 pm	#12 New Hampshire*	#20	Gene Polisseni Center • Henrietta, New York	FloHockey, NESN	Scarfone	L 3–4 ^{OT}	2,610	8–4–0
December 1	7:05 pm	Robert Morris	#19	Gene Polisseni Center • Henrietta, New York	FloHockey, SNP	Scarfone	W 4–1	2,896	9–4–0 (7–2–0)
December 2	7:05 pm	Robert Morris	#19	Gene Polisseni Center • Henrietta, New York	FloHockey	Lush	W 6–2	2,650	10–4–0 (8–2–0)
December 8	5:05 pm	at American International	#19	MassMutual Center • Springfield, Massachusetts	FloHockey	Scarfone	L 2–3 ^{OT}	—	10–5–0 (8–3–0)
December 9	1:05 pm	at American International	#19	MassMutual Center • Springfield, Massachusetts	FloHockey	Scarfone	W 5–2	552	11–5–0 (9–3–0)
Ledyard Bank Classic
December 29	4:00 pm	vs. #8 Maine*	#18	Thompson Arena • Hanover, New Hampshire (Ledyard Bank Semifinal)	ESPN+	Scarfone	L 2–5	2,555	11–6–0
December 30	4:00 pm	vs. Lake Superior State*	#18	Thompson Arena • Hanover, New Hampshire (Ledyard Bank Consolation Game)	ESPN+	Scarfone	W 4–2	2,310	12–6–0
January 5	7:05 pm	Clarkson*	#18	Gene Polisseni Center • Henrietta, New York	FloHockey	Scarfone	W 4–0	3,091	13–6–0
January 6	5:05 pm	St. Lawrence*	#18	Gene Polisseni Center • Henrietta, New York	FloHockey	Scarfone	T 1–1 ^{OT}	2,816	13–6–1
January 11	7:05 pm	at Niagara	#19	Dwyer Arena • Lewiston, New York	FloHockey	Scarfone	L 1–3	754	13–7–1 (9–4–0)
January 16	7:05 pm	Canisius	#20	Gene Polisseni Center • Henrietta, New York	FloHockey	Scarfone	L 2–3 ^{OT}	2,038	13–8–1 (9–5–0)
January 19	7:05 pm	at Robert Morris	#20	Clearview Arena • Neville Township, Pennsylvania	FloHockey, SNP	Scarfone	W 6–3	592	14–8–1 (10–5–0)
January 20	7:05 pm	at Robert Morris	#20	Clearview Arena • Neville Township, Pennsylvania	FloHockey	Lush	W 7–1	805	15–8–1 (11–5–0)
January 26	7:05 pm	Bentley	#19	Gene Polisseni Center • Henrietta, New York	FloHockey	Scarfone	W 3–0	3,494	16–8–1 (12–5–0)
January 27	5:05 pm	Bentley	#19	Gene Polisseni Center • Henrietta, New York	FloHockey	Scarfone	W 2–1 ^{OT}	3,820	17–8–1 (13–5–0)
February 1	7:00 pm	at Niagara	#19	Dwyer Arena • Lewiston, New York	FloHockey	Scarfone	T 4–4 ^{SOL}	807	17–8–2 (13–5–1)
February 3	5:05 pm	Niagara	#19	Gene Polisseni Center • Henrietta, New York	FloHockey	Scarfone	W 4–2	4,123	18–8–2 (14–5–1)
February 9	7:05 pm	at Mercyhurst	#20	Mercyhurst Ice Center • Erie, Pennsylvania	FloHockey	Scarfone	W 7–6 ^{OT}	1,017	19–8–2 (15–5–1)
February 10	4:05 pm	at Mercyhurst	#20	Mercyhurst Ice Center • Erie, Pennsylvania	FloHockey	Lush	L 2–3	1,027	19–9–2 (15–6–1)
February 16	7:05 pm	Air Force	#20	Gene Polisseni Center • Henrietta, New York	FloHockey	Scarfone	W 7–3	2,954	20–9–2 (16–6–1)
February 17	7:05 pm	Air Force	#20	Gene Polisseni Center • Henrietta, New York	FloHockey, Altitude2	Scarfone	L 2–3	4,300	20–10–2 (16–7–1)
February 23	7:05 pm	Canisius	#20	Gene Polisseni Center • Henrietta, New York	FloHockey	Scarfone	W 9–2	4,233	21–10–2 (17–7–1)
February 24	7:00 pm	at Canisius	#20	LECOM Harborcenter • Buffalo, New York	FloHockey	Scarfone	W 3–2	1,335	22–10–2 (18–7–1)
Atlantic Hockey Tournament
March 8	7:05 pm	Robert Morris*	#19	Gene Polisseni Center • Henrietta, New York (Quarterfinal Game 1)	FloHockey	Scarfone	W 7–0	2,988	23–10–2
March 9	7:05 pm	Robert Morris*	#19	Gene Polisseni Center • Henrietta, New York (Quarterfinal Game 2)	FloHockey	Scarfone	W 5–1	3,248	24–10–2
March 15	7:05 pm	Niagara*	#19	Gene Polisseni Center • Henrietta, New York (Semifinal Game 1)	FloHockey	Scarfone	W 4–1	2,564	25–10–2
March 16	7:05 pm	Niagara*	#19	Gene Polisseni Center • Henrietta, New York (Semifinal Game 2)	FloHockey	Scarfone	W 5–2	3,284	26–10–2
March 23	7:05 pm	American International*	#18	Gene Polisseni Center • Henrietta, New York (Championship)	FloHockey	Scarfone	W 5–2	4,233	27–10–2
NCAA Tournament
March 28	5:00 pm	vs. #2 Boston University*	#17	Denny Sanford PREMIER Center • Sioux Falls, South Dakota (West Regional Semifinal)	ESPNU	Scarfone	L 3–6	5,691	27–11–2
*Non-conference game. ^{#}Rankings from USCHO.com Poll. All times are in Eastern Time. Source:

== NCAA Tournament ==
March 28, 2024; 4:00 pm	(1) Boston University	6–3 (2–1, 2–1, 2–1)	(4) RIT	Denny Sanford Premier Center; Attendance: 5,691

Game reference

Mathieu Caron
Goalies
Tommy Scarfone
Referees:
Bruce Vida
Brady Johnson
Linesmen:
Tyler Landman
Nathan Voll

(M. Celebrini, Kaplan) Lane Hutson (14) – 11:56	1–0
(unassisted) Ryan Greene (12) – 13:01	2–0
	2–1	15:40 – PP – Elijah Gonsalves (20) (Wilde, Cassaro)
(L. Hutson, Kaplan) Sam Stevens (9) – 28:16	3–1
	3–2	35:20 – Gianfranco Cassaro (18) (Nicholson)
(Peterson, Zabaneh) Macklin Celebrini (32) – GW – 37:01	4–2
(Lachance, Willander) Jack Harvey (6) – 41:29	5–2
(Willander, Zabaneh) Dylan Peterson (8) – EN – 55:46	6–2
	6–3	59:03 – Cody Laskosky (4) (Catalano, Blom)

6 min
Penalties
6 min
33
Shots
31

== Scoring statistics ==
Name	Position	Games	Goals	Assists	Points	PIM
Carter Wilkie	RW	40	16	25	41	32
Cody Laskosky	F	37	14	27	41	26
Elijah Gonsalves	C/RW	36	20	18	38	30
Gianfranco Cassaro	D	40	18	20	38	28
Matthew Wilde	LW	40	19	16	35	16
Aiden Hansen-Bukata	D	37	5	26	31	28
Tyler Fukakusa	C	39	9	19	28	18
Tanner Andrew	C	38	6	15	21	10
Grady Hobbs	LW/RW	39	10	8	18	16
Simon Isabelle	RW	39	8	10	18	29
Christian Catalano	RW	36	9	8	17	60
Tyler Mahan	LW	35	6	7	13	16
Philippe Jacques	C	37	5	5	10	29
Gustav Blom	D	32	3	7	10	20
Xavier Lapointe	D	28	2	8	10	29
Dimitri Mikrogiannakis	D	40	2	7	9	41
Ryan Nicholson	D	40	0	9	9	22
Crossley Stewart	D	30	2	6	8	23
Caleb Moretz	C/RW	39	1	5	6	8
Kevin Scott	D	29	0	3	3	19
Adam Jeffery	LW	11	1	1	2	4
Evan Miller	C	10	0	2	2	4
Daniel Chenard	G	1	0	0	0	0
Luke Lush	G	4	0	0	0	0
Doug Scott	D	7	0	0	0	14
Tommy Scarfone	G	36	0	0	0	0
Total			156	252	408	507

== Goaltending statistics ==
Name	Games	Minutes	Wins	Losses	Ties	Goals against	Saves	Shut outs	SV %	GAA
Tommy Scarfone	36	2274:46	25	9	2	82	1015	4	.925	2.26
Luke Lush	5	237:33	2	2	0	9	102	0	.919	2.27
Daniel Chenard	1	4:23	0	0	0	1	5	0	.833	13.69
Empty Net	-	14:14	-	-	-	4	-	-	-	-
Total	40	2430:56	27	11	2	96	1122	4	.921	2.37

== Rankings ==
Poll	Week																										
Poll	Pre	1	2	3	4	5	6	7	8	9	10	11	12	13	14	15	16	17	18	19	20	21	22	23	24	25	26 (Final)
USCHO.com	NR	NR	NR	NR	NR	20	20	20	19	19	18	–	18	19	20	19	19	20	20	20	19	19	19	18	17	–	17
USA Hockey	NR	NR	NR	NR	NR	NR	NR	NR	19	19	19	19	–	20	20	20	NR	20т	NR	NR	20	20	19	19	18	17	17

Note: USCHO did not release a poll in weeks 11 and 25.
USA Hockey did not release a poll in week 12.

== Awards and honors ==
Player	Award	Ref
Gianfranco Cassaro	AHCA East Second Team All-American	
Tommy Scarfone	Atlantic Hockey Goaltender of the Year	
Wayne Wilson	Atlantic Hockey Coach of the Year	
Elijah Gonsalves	Atlantic Hockey Most Valuable Player in Tournament	
Tommy Scarfone	Atlantic Hockey First Team	
Gianfranco Cassaro	Atlantic Hockey First Team	
Carter Wilkie	Atlantic Hockey First Team	
Cody Laskosky	Atlantic Hockey First Team	
Aiden Hansen-Bukata	Atlantic Hockey Second Team	
Elijah Gonsalves	Atlantic Hockey Third Team	
Tommy Scarfone	Atlantic Hockey All-Tournament Team	
Gianfranco Cassaro	Atlantic Hockey All-Tournament Team	
Elijah Gonsalves	Atlantic Hockey All-Tournament Team	
Tyler Fukakusa	Atlantic Hockey All-Tournament Team	
