= 2023–24 Bentley Falcons men's ice hockey season =

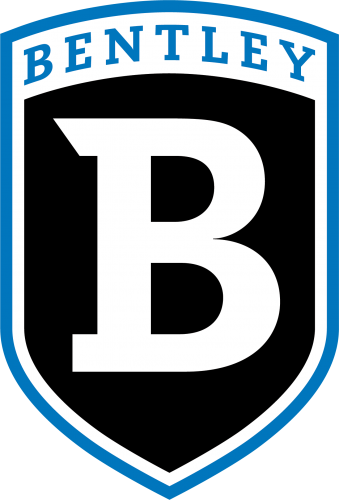
- Conference: 6th Atlantic Hockey
- Home ice: Bentley Arena

Rankings
- USCHO: NR
- USA Hockey: NR

Record
- Overall: 16–17–2
- Conference: 12–12–2
- Home: 9–7–1
- Road: 7–9–1
- Neutral: 0–1–0

Coaches and captains
- Head coach: Andy Jones
- Assistant coaches: Tom Fiorentino; Riley Colvard
- Captain: Ethan Leyh

The 2023–24 Bentley Falcons men's ice hockey season was the 47th season of play for the program, the 25th at the Division I level and the 21st in Atlantic Hockey. The Falcons represented Bentley University, played their home games at the Bentley Arena and were coached by Andy Jones in his 1st season.

== Season ==
After More than 25 years with the program, Ryan Soderquist announced that he was stepping down as coach after the 2023 season. A few months later, the school hired Andy Jones as the program's 7th head coach.

Under their new coach, the Falcons had a solid season. The team lost most of their non-conference matches but several came against ranked teams, including an overtime contest with Boston University to kick off the season. The Falcons hovered around .500 for the entire season, and entered the postseason at exactly even. Bentley's 6th-place finish forced them to play in the conference First Round but game the team the best possible matchup.

The Falcons were set against Robert Morris, who were playing their first season after a two-year hiatus, and were expected to win the match. Unfortunately, the Falcons got into power play trouble and allowed RMU to take the lead on the strength of two man-advantage goals. Garrett Horsager came to the rescue in the third, scoring and then assisting on the game-tying goal to force sending the match into overtime. Neither team had much of an advantage in the extra session and, as the period progressed, the match seemed destined for a second overtime. With just 10 seconds left, Conner Hasley grabbed the puck behind his cage and tried to made a reverse-pass to Tucker Hodgson. The Colonial skater who was forechecking predicted the play, intercepted the pass, and wrapped the puck around the front before Hasley could get back into the net. The costly mistake ended the game and the season for the Falcons.

== Departures ==
Player	Position	Nationality	Cause
Matt Gosiewski	Forward	United States	Graduation (retired)
Cole Kodsi	Forward	United States	Transferred to Union
Nicholas Niemo	Forward	Canada	Transferred to Maine
Dylan Pitera	Forward	United States	Graduation (retired)
Jordan Schulting	Defenseman	Canada	Graduation (retired)
Harrison Scott	Forward	United States	Transferred to Maine
Hunter Toale	Defenseman	United States	Graduation (retired)
Lucas Vanroboys	Forward	Canada	Graduate transfer to Massachusetts
Marcus Walter	Defenseman	Canada	Graduation (retired)
Joe Winkelmann	Forward	United States	Graduation (signed with Corsaires de Dunkerque)

== Recruiting ==
Player	Position	Nationality	Age	Notes
Kolby Amici	Forward	United States	20	Orchard Park, NY
Nik Armstrong-Kingcade	Forward	United States	24	Rostock, GER; transfer from Massachusetts Lowell
Jonathan Bendorf	Forward	United States	24	Yardville, NJ; graduate transfer from Mercyhurst
Colton Cameron	Defenseman	Canada	21	Surrey, BC
Chase Davis	Forward	United States	21	Alpharetta, GA
Jimmy Doyle	Forward	United States	21	Plainfield, IL
Sam Duerr	Defenseman	United States	21	Chicago, IL; transfer from Maine
Kellan Hjartarson	Forward	Canada	20	Calgary, AB
A. J. Hodges	Forward	United States	22	Littleton, CO; transfer from Michigan State
Garrett Horsager	Defenseman	United States	21	Rosemount, MN
Peter Kramer	Forward	United States	21	Bridgewater, MA
Ryan Mansfield	Forward	Canada	20	Burlington, ON

== Roster ==
As of September 14, 2023.

No.	Nat.	Player	Class	Pos	Height	Weight	DoB	Hometown	Previous team	NHL rights
2	(United States)	Matt Thompson	Graduate	F	6' 1" (1.85 m)	205 lb (93 kg)	1998-11-07	Reading, Massachusetts	EHC Neuwied (Regionalliga)	—
3	(United States)	Jonathan Bendorf	Graduate	F	5' 11" (1.8 m)	188 lb (85 kg)	1999-02-26	Yardville, New Jersey	Mercyhurst (AHA)	—
4	(United States)	Sam Duerr	Junior	D	6' 1" (1.85 m)	190 lb (86 kg)	2002-03-22	Chicago, Illinois	Maine (HEA)	—
5	(Canada)	Nick Bochen	Senior	D	5' 9" (1.75 m)	170 lb (77 kg)	2001-08-29	North Vancouver, British Columbia	Quinnipiac (ECAC)	—
6	(Canada)	Seth Bernard-Docker	Sophomore	D	6' 0" (1.83 m)	190 lb (86 kg)	2001-10-30	Canmore, Alberta	Sioux Falls Stampede (USHL)	—
7	(United States)	Ethan Harrison	Senior	F	6' 0" (1.83 m)	180 lb (82 kg)	2000-10-30	Plano, Texas	Sioux City Musketeers (USHL)	—
9	(Canada)	Josh Latta	Graduate	F	6' 0" (1.83 m)	180 lb (82 kg)	1998-08-14	West Vancouver, British Columbia	Massachusetts Lowell (HEA)	—
10	(United States)	Jimmy Doyle	Freshman	F	6' 2" (1.88 m)	190 lb (86 kg)	2002-04-02	Plainfield, Illinois	Janesville Jets (NAHL)	—
11	(Canada)	Ryan Mansfield	Freshman	F	5' 11" (1.8 m)	195 lb (88 kg)	2002-12-22	Burlington, Ontario	Odessa Jackalopes (NAHL)	—
12	(Canada)	Danny Pearson	Junior	F	5' 10" (1.78 m)	185 lb (84 kg)	2000-06-01	Vancouver, British Columbia	Coquitlam Express (BCHL)	—
13	(United States)	Peter Kramer	Freshman	F	5' 11" (1.8 m)	185 lb (84 kg)	2002-08-08	Bridgewater, Massachusetts	Green Bay Gamblers (USHL)	—
14	(United States)	Pat Lawn	Sophomore	D	6' 0" (1.83 m)	175 lb (79 kg)	2001-03-26	Waltham, Massachusetts	West Kelowna Warriors (BCHL)	—
15	(Canada)	Cooper Connell	Junior	F	6' 3" (1.91 m)	190 lb (86 kg)	2001-07-15	West Vancouver, British Columbia	Grande Prairie Storm (AJHL)	—
16	(Canada)	Kellan Hjartarson	Freshman	F	5' 11" (1.8 m)	175 lb (79 kg)	2003-02-23	Calgary, Alberta	Cranbrook Bucks (BCHL)	—
17	(Canada)	Stephen Castagna	Sophomore	F	5' 9" (1.75 m)	170 lb (77 kg)	2001-08-06	North Vancouver, British Columbia	Alberni Valley Bulldogs (BCHL)	—
18	(Canada)	Arlo Merritt	Sophomore	F	6' 3" (1.91 m)	215 lb (98 kg)	2001-01-31	Halifax, Nova Scotia	Alberni Valley Bulldogs (BCHL)	—
19	(Canada)	Ethan Leyh (C)	Senior (RS)	F	6' 0" (1.83 m)	195 lb (88 kg)	2001-06-07	Anmore, British Columbia	Quinnipiac (ECAC)	—
20	(United States)	A. J. Hodges	Senior	F	6' 0" (1.83 m)	180 lb (82 kg)	2001-08-24	Littleton, Colorado	Michigan State (Big Ten)	—
21	(Germany)	Nik Armstrong-Kingkade	Senior	F	5' 9" (1.75 m)	185 lb (84 kg)	1999-05-01	Mannheim, Germany	Massachusetts Lowell (HEA)	—
22	(United States)	Chase Davis	Freshman	F	6' 4" (1.93 m)	210 lb (95 kg)	2002-04-08	Alpharetta, Georgia	Amarillo Wranglers (NAHL)	—
23	(United States)	Tucker Hodgson	Junior	D	6' 3" (1.91 m)	195 lb (88 kg)	2001-06-07	Grand Forks, North Dakota	Fargo Force (USHL)	—
24	(Canada)	Colton Cameron	Freshman	D	5' 11" (1.8 m)	190 lb (86 kg)	2002-07-07	Surrey, British Columbia	Prince George Spruce Kings (BCHL)	—
25	(United States)	Garrett Horsager	Freshman	D	6' 0" (1.83 m)	180 lb (82 kg)	2002-02-02	Rosemount, Minnesota	Oklahoma Warriors (NAHL)	—
26	(United States)	Kolby Amici	Freshman	F	5' 9" (1.75 m)	180 lb (82 kg)	2002-12-16	Orchard Park, New York	Minot Minotauros (NAHL)	—
27	(United States)	Ryan Nause	Sophomore	D	5' 11" (1.8 m)	180 lb (82 kg)	2001-08-27	Riverview, New Brunswick	Alberni Valley Bulldogs (BCHL)	—
28	(Canada)	Tanner Main	Junior	D	5' 11" (1.8 m)	175 lb (79 kg)	2000-04-03	Welland, Ontario	Prince George Spruce Kings (BCHL)	—
29	(United States)	Nicholas Grabko	Senior	G	6' 0" (1.83 m)	180 lb (82 kg)	2000-02-06	Channahon, Illinois	Green Bay Gamblers (USHL)	—
30	(United States)	Josh Seeley	Sophomore	G	6' 4" (1.93 m)	220 lb (100 kg)	2001-05-07	Trenton, Michigan	Minnesota Magicians (NAHL)	—
33	(United States)	Connor Hasley	Sophomore	G	6' 1" (1.85 m)	193 lb (88 kg)	2001-02-27	North Tonawanda, New York	Cedar Rapids RoughRiders (USHL)	—
38	(Canada)	Ryan Upson	Sophomore	F	6' 0" (1.83 m)	190 lb (86 kg)	2001-03-22	West Vancouver, British Columbia	Langley Rivermen (BCHL)	—

== Standings ==
2023–24 Atlantic Hockey Standings
	Conference record										Overall record					
	GP	W	L	T	OW	OL	SW	PTS	GF	GA	GP	W	L	T	GF	GA
#17 RIT †*	26	18	7	1	3	2	0	54	102	64	40	27	11	2	156	96
Holy Cross	26	13	10	3	0	3	1	46	78	62	39	21	14	4	116	93
Sacred Heart	26	14	10	2	2	2	1	45	75	70	36	14	19	3	91	113
Air Force	26	15	10	1	3	0	1	44	88	75	38	18	19	1	115	119
American International	26	12	10	4	1	1	2	42	79	68	40	20	16	4	119	111
Bentley	26	12	12	2	1	2	2	41	69	58	35	16	17	2	95	82
Niagara	26	13	10	3	3	1	1	41	78	79	39	18	18	3	111	122
Canisius	26	10	12	4	2	1	0	33	73	87	37	12	21	4	103	126
Mercyhurst	26	7	15	4	0	1	4	30	77	91	35	9	22	4	98	126
Army	26	8	16	2	0	1	1	28	66	96	35	10	23	2	93	139
Robert Morris	26	7	17	2	0	1	1	25	60	95	39	11	25	3	94	142
Championship: March 23, 2024 † indicates conference regular season champion (DeGregorio Trophy) * indicates conference tournament champion (Riley Trophy); Rankings: USCHO.com Top 20 Poll

== Schedule and results ==
Date	Time	Opponent^{#}	Rank^{#}	Site	TV	Decision	Result	Attendance	Record
Regular Season
October 7	7:05 pm	#1 Boston University*		Bentley Arena • Waltham, Massachusetts	FloHockey	Hasley	L 2–3 ^{OT}	2,200	0–1–0
October 14	7:00 pm	at #19 Northeastern*		Matthews Arena • Boston, Massachusetts	ESPN+	Grabko	L 2–5	4,287	0–2–0
October 20	7:00 pm	Stonehill*		Bentley Arena • Waltham, Massachusetts	FloHockey	Hasley	W 2–0	1,350	1–2–0
October 21	6:00 pm	Stonehill*		Bentley Arena • Waltham, Massachusetts	FloHockey	Grabko	W 4–1	1,243	2–2–0
October 27	7:00 pm	at Robert Morris		Clearview Arena • Neville Township, Pennsylvania	FloHockey	Hasley	L 3–4	643	2–3–0 (0–1–0)
October 28	4:00 pm	at Robert Morris		Clearview Arena • Neville Township, Pennsylvania	FloHockey	Grabko	W 3–0	619	3–3–0 (1–1–0)
November 2	7:05 pm	at American International		MassMutual Center • Springfield, Massachusetts	FloHockey	Hasley	L 0–3	201	3–4–0 (1–2–0)
November 3	7:05 pm	American International		Bentley Arena • Waltham, Massachusetts	FloHockey	Grabko	W 3–1	1,423	4–4–0 (2–2–0)
November 10	7:05 pm	Niagara		Bentley Arena • Waltham, Massachusetts	FloHockey	Hasley	W 6–2	1,346	5–4–0 (3–2–0)
November 11	7:05 pm	Niagara		Bentley Arena • Waltham, Massachusetts	FloHockey	Grabko	W 2–1	890	6–4–0 (4–2–0)
November 16	7:00 pm	Holy Cross		Hart Center • Worcester, Massachusetts	FloHockey	Grabko	L 0–2	817	6–5–0 (4–3–0)
November 17	4:05 pm	at Holy Cross		Bentley Arena • Waltham, Massachusetts	FloHockey	Hasley	L 0–2	775	6–6–0 (4–4–0)
November 21	7:05 pm	at American International		MassMutual Center • Springfield, Massachusetts	FloHockey	Grabko	L 2–4	389	6–7–0 (4–5–0)
Turkey Leg Classic
November 24	4:00 pm	at Massachusetts Lowell*		Tsongas Center • Lowell, Massachusetts (Turkey Leg Game 1)	ESPN+	Hasley	W 4–1	3,568	7–7–0
November 25	4:00 pm	at Merrimack*		J. Thom Lawler Rink • North Andover, Massachusetts (Turkey Leg Game 2)	ESPN+	Grabko	L 3–4	1,547	7–8–0
December 1	9:05 pm	at Air Force		Cadet Ice Arena • Colorado Springs, Colorado	FloHockey	Hasley	L 2–3 ^{OT}	2,213	7–9–0 (4–6–0)
December 2	7:05 pm	at Air Force		Cadet Ice Arena • Colorado Springs, Colorado	FloHockey	Grabko	W 3–0	2,190	8–9–0 (5–6–0)
December 9	7:00 pm	vs. #8 Maine*		Cross Insurance Arena • Portland, Maine		Hasley	L 2–3	6,291	8–10–0
December 30	5:30 pm	Union*		Bentley Arena • Waltham, Massachusetts	FloHockey	Grabko	W 4–3	1,275	9–10–0
January 2	7:00 pm	at Army		Tate Rink • West Point, New York	FloHockey	Hasley	W 5–2	1,533	10–10–0 (6–6–0)
January 5	7:05 pm	Air Force		Bentley Arena • Waltham, Massachusetts	FloHockey	Grabko	L 1–3	1,389	10–11–0 (6–7–0)
January 6	5:05 pm	Air Force		Bentley Arena • Waltham, Massachusetts	FloHockey	Hasley	L 3–7	1,555	10–12–0 (6–8–0)
January 12	7:05 pm	Sacred Heart		Bentley Arena • Waltham, Massachusetts	FloHockey	Grabko	L 3–4	1,800	10–13–0 (6–9–0)
January 13	7:00 pm	at Sacred Heart		Martire Family Arena • Fairfield, Connecticut	FloHockey	Hasley	W 3–2 ^{OT}	3,242	11–13–0 (7–9–0)
January 19	7:05 pm	Mercyhurst		Bentley Arena • Waltham, Massachusetts	FloHockey	Hasley	W 4–0	879	12–13–0 (8–9–0)
January 20	7:05 pm	Mercyhurst		Bentley Arena • Waltham, Massachusetts	FloHockey	Hasley	W 8–4	945	13–13–0 (9–9–0)
January 26	7:05 pm	at #19 RIT		Gene Polisseni Center • Henrietta, New York	FloHockey	Hasley	L 0–3	3,494	13–14–0 (9–10–0)
January 27	5:05 pm	at #19 RIT		Gene Polisseni Center • Henrietta, New York	FloHockey	Grabko	L 1–2 ^{OT}	3,820	13–15–0 (9–11–0)
February 2	7:05 pm	Army		Bentley Arena • Waltham, Massachusetts	FloHockey	Hasley	W 4–2	1,630	14–15–0 (10–11–0)
February 3	4:05 pm	Army		Bentley Arena • Waltham, Massachusetts	FloHockey	Grabko	L 1–2	1,515	14–16–0 (10–12–0)
February 9	7:00 pm	at Canisius		LECOM Harborcenter • Buffalo, New York	FloHockey	Hasley	W 3–0	898	15–16–0 (11–12–0)
February 10	6:00 pm	at Canisius		LECOM Harborcenter • Buffalo, New York	FloHockey	Grabko	T 2–2 ^{SOW}	890	15–16–1 (11–12–1)
February 22	7:00 pm	at Holy Cross		Hart Center • Worcester, Massachusetts	FloHockey	Hasley	W 5–1	1,167	16–16–1 (12–12–1)
February 24	5:30 pm	Sacred Heart		Bentley Arena • Waltham, Massachusetts	FloHockey	Hasley	T 2–2 ^{SOW}	2,043	16–16–2 (12–12–2)
Atlantic Hockey Tournament
March 2	7:00 pm	Robert Morris*		Bentley Arena • Waltham, Massachusetts (First Round)	FloHockey	Hasley	L 3–4 ^{OT}	1,678	16–17–2
*Non-conference game. ^{#}Rankings from USCHO.com Poll. All times are in Eastern Time. Source:

== Scoring statistics ==
Name	Position	Games	Goals	Assists	Points	PIM
Ethan Leyh	F	35	13	16	29	34
Stephen Castagna	F	35	6	21	27	37
Nick Bochen	D	35	6	18	24	20
Ryan Mansfield	LW	31	7	11	18	2
Kellan Hjartarson	F	34	8	9	17	16
Chase Davis	F	35	8	8	16	18
A. J. Hodges	LW	29	6	9	15	2
Samuel Duerr	D	35	6	7	13	12
Nik Armstrong-Kingkade	F	24	7	5	12	25
Ryan Upson	F	27	6	6	12	8
Arlo Merritt	C	30	6	6	12	4
Garrett Horsager	D	35	2	9	11	12
Josh Latta	F	28	2	8	10	25
Ryan Nause	D	23	1	6	7	12
Seth Bernard-Docker	D	16	0	6	6	4
Jonathan Bendorf	LW	26	3	3	6	14
Jimmy Doyle	RW	25	0	5	5	16
Colton Cameron	D	24	2	3	5	10
Tucker Hodgson	D	35	1	4	5	22
Matt Thomson	LW	12	2	2	4	8
Pat Lawn	D	28	0	4	4	29
Peter Kramer	F	16	0	3	3	13
Kolby Amici	F	14	2	0	2	6
Ethan Harrison	F	13	1	0	1	2
Tanner Main	D	13	0	1	1	10
Connor Hasley	G	21	0	0	0	2
Nicholas Grabko	G	15	0	0	0	4
Cooper Connell	F	2	0	0	0	0
Danny Pearson	F	2	0	0	0	4
Total			95	170	265	371

== Goaltending statistics ==
Name	Games	Minutes	Wins	Losses	Ties	Goals Against	Saves	Shut Outs	SV %	GAA
Connor Hasley	21	1269:02	10	9	1	47	448	3	.905	2.22
Nicholas Grabko	15	850:19	6	8	1	34	335	2	.908	2.40
Empty Net	-	20:45	-	-	-	1	-	-	-	-
Total	35	2140:06	16	17	2	82	783	5	.905	2.30

== Rankings ==
Poll	Week																										
Poll	Pre	1	2	3	4	5	6	7	8	9	10	11	12	13	14	15	16	17	18	19	20	21	22	23	24	25	26 (Final)
USCHO.com	NR	NR	NR	NR	NR	NR	NR	NR	NR	NR	NR	–	NR	NR	NR	NR	NR	NR	NR	NR	NR	NR	NR	NR	NR	–	NR
USA Hockey	NR	NR	NR	NR	NR	NR	NR	NR	NR	NR	NR	NR	–	NR	NR	NR	NR	NR	NR	NR	NR	NR	NR	NR	NR	NR	NR

Note: USCHO did not release a poll in weeks 11 and 25.
Note: USA Hockey did not release a poll in week 12.

== Awards and honors ==
Player	Award	Ref
Nick Bochen	Atlantic Hockey Third Team	
Ethan Leyh	Atlantic Hockey Third Team	
