= 2023–24 Holy Cross Crusaders men's ice hockey season =

- Conference: 2nd Atlantic Hockey
- Home ice: Hart Center

Rankings
- USCHO: NR
- USA Hockey: NR

Record
- Overall: 21–14–4
- Conference: 13–10–3
- Home: 14–9–0
- Road: 7–5–4

Coaches and captains
- Head coach: Bill Riga
- Assistant coaches: Castan Sommer; Drew Michals; Connor Mauro
- Captain: Jack Ricketts
- Alternate captain(s): Tyler Ghirardosi; Jake Higgins; Jack Robilotti

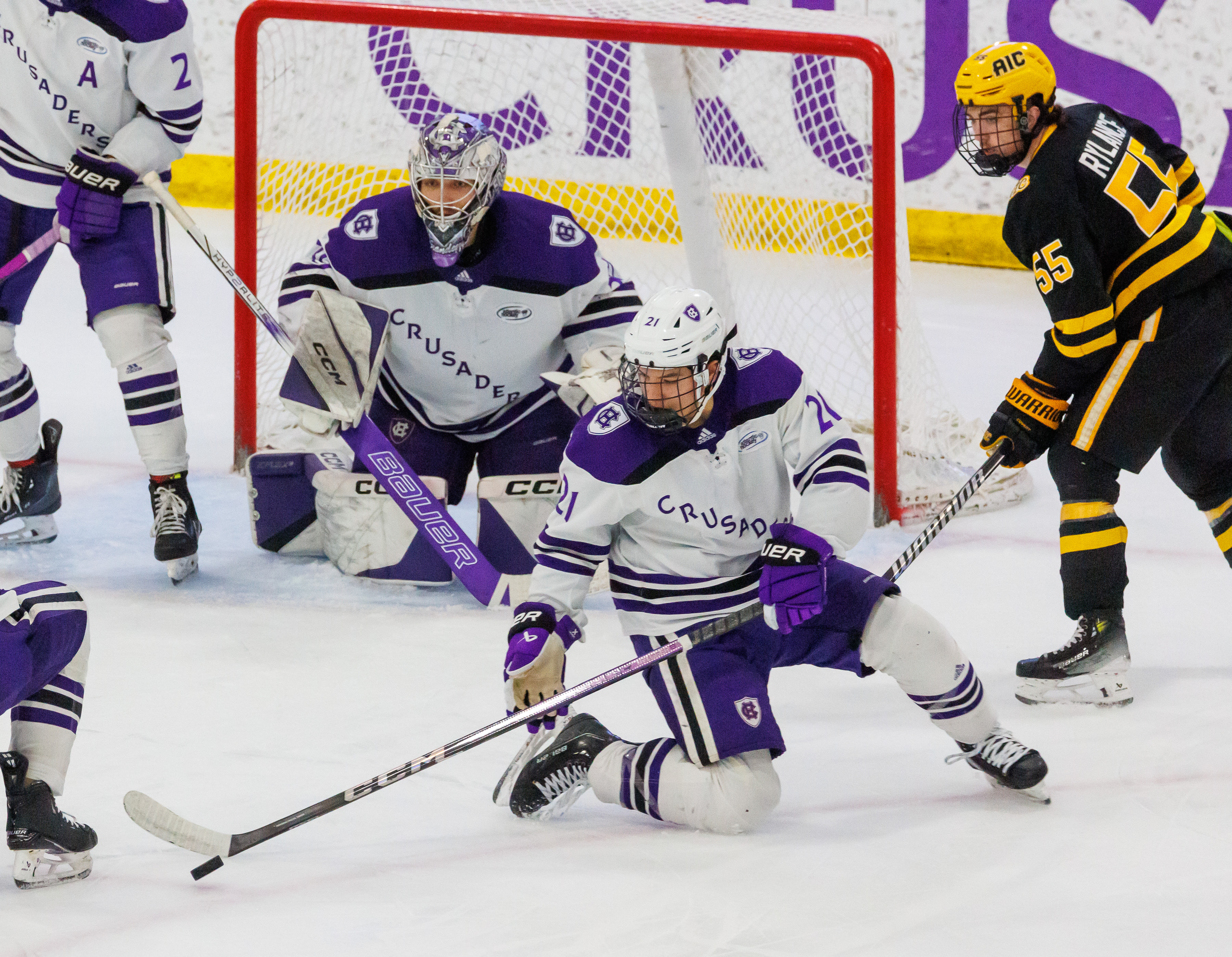
Holy Cross vs. American International in the AHA semifinals

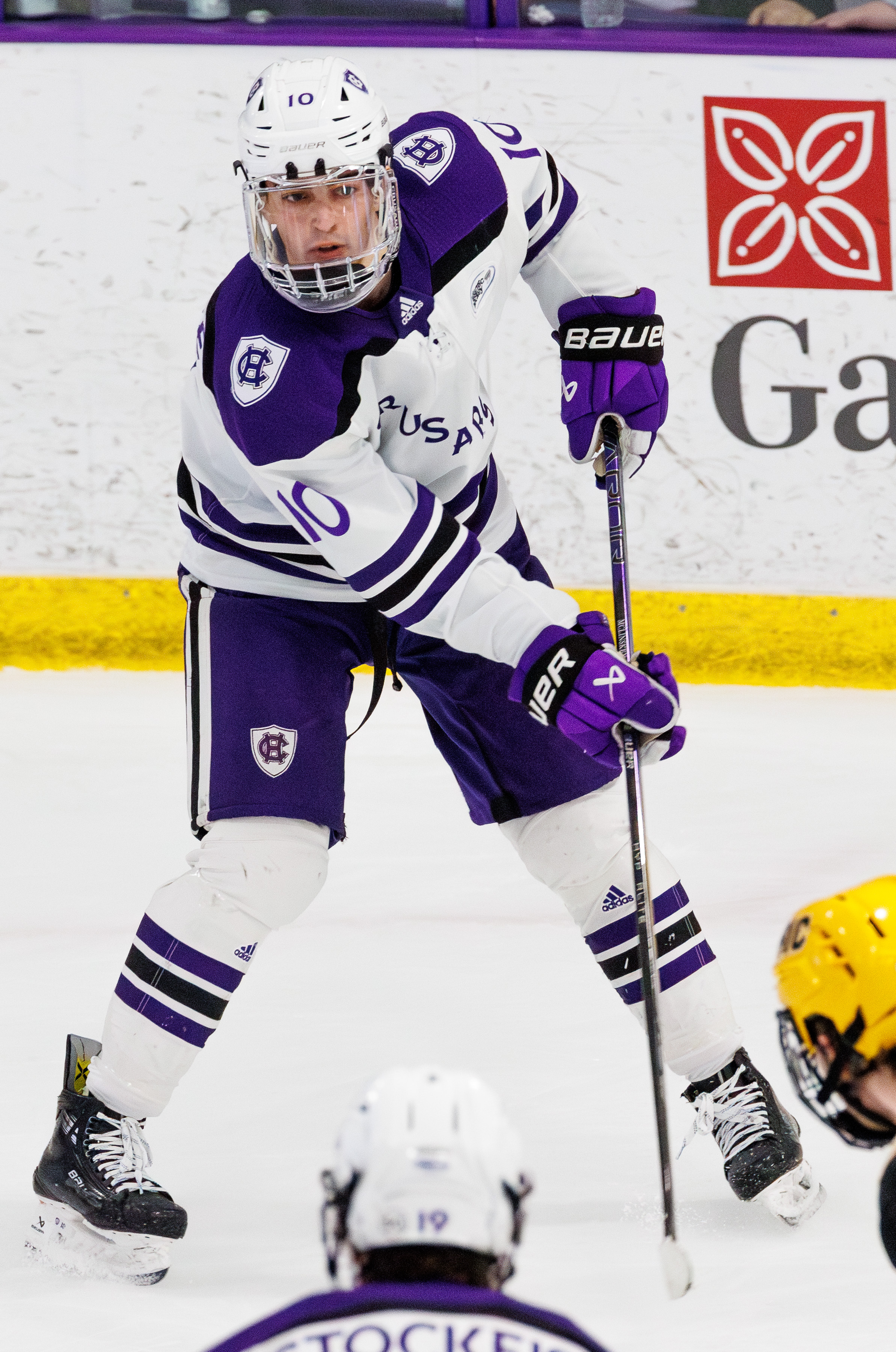
Liam McLinskey was named 2024 Atlantic Hockey Player of the Year

The 2023–24 Holy Cross Crusaders men's ice hockey season was the 58th season of play for the program, the 26th at the Division I level and the 21st in Atlantic Hockey. The Crusaders represented the College of the Holy Cross, played their home games at the Hart Center and were coached by Bill Riga in his 3rd season.

== Season ==
With most of its team returning, Holy Cross was well-positioned for a good season. Even so, it was a surprise when the Crusaders started the season with a sweep of a ranked Connecticut squad and were ranked #1 in the PairWise, albeit very briefly. Unfortunately for the Crusaders, nominal starter Jason Grande had a few week outing at the end of October. When Thomas Gale was inserted into the goal, the situation didn't immediately resolve itself and the team stumbled to a sub-.500 record by mid-November. With their season spinning out of control, a pair of shutouts by Gale over Bentley just before Thanksgiving halted their descent.

As the goaltending resolved itself, the offense was still in the process of rounding into form. The forward unit hadn't been bad in the first two months of the season but they had failed to take advantage of their chances. By early December, Holy Cross had lost five 1-goal games and were wallowing at the bottom of the Atlantic Hockey standings. A less than satisfactory slate of non-conference games around Christmas wiped away their early gains and did not portend well for the second half of the year.

When they returned to their conference schedule, the team had a good weekend against American International but then followed that up with probably their worse game of the season. Against bottom-dwelling Army, Holy Cross was shutout for the first time on the year and took numerous penalties. The game ended with Mack Oliphant receiving a match penalty for grabbing a face mask. emotions seemed to boil over in the rematch when leading scorer Liam McLinskey was ejected for abuse of the officials, though he managed to avoid a suspension. The following week, the team struggled through another 1-goal loss where they were assessed a major penalty.

The second game with Sacred Heart earned the team a weekend split but, most importantly, began a resurgence for the offense. From January 20 through February 16, Holy Cross scored at least 5 goals in each game. The suddenly high-powered offense was spearheaded by McLinskey who averaged 2 points per game in that stretch and shot up the program's all-time scoring list. The seven game winning streak propelled the team towards the top of the conference standings, enabling the Crusaders to finish second behind RIT. It also saw a return to form of Jason Grande, who regained the starting role at the beginning of February and never relinquished the crease.

When the conference tournament began, Holy Cross was given a bye into the quarterfinal round and were allowed to rest for a week before continuing. The team looked prepared for Canisius in the first game, outshooting the Griffins nearly 2-to-1. Unfortunately, they still found themselves down 2–3 entering the third period. After McLinskey tied the game, Jack Stockfish scored the winning goal on the power play and gave the Crusaders a bit of breathing room. The second match saw Canisius fight back and outshoot CHC in regulation. Penalties were largely responsible with two minors in the third giving the Griffins a chance to take the rematch. Fortunately, Grande had recovered from his subpar performance in game one and he surrendered just 1 goal on 35 shots to force overtime. The Crusaders took over the game in extra time, widely outshooting Canisius 14–3 in the first session. While they weren't able to score in that 20-minute stretch, the pressure they put on Canisius eventually led to defensive breakdown at the beginning of the fifth period.

In the semifinals, Holy Cross found itself opposite American International. A solid first period staked CHC to a lead that they would not relinquish, however, it was also the last time their offense would function properly. Over the succeeding two games, Holy Cross managed just a single goal on 77 shots. The Crusaders went 0 for 6 on the power play and were unable to solve the Yellow Jackets' goaltender. Their season was brought to an shocking finish with the failure of their previously stable offense.

In spite of the end, Liam McLinskey still managed to tie for the second best scoring performance in program history. While he scored 2 goals fewer than the year before, he had septupled his assist total to finish just outside the top-10 in the entire NCAA. This was also the first 20-win season for the program in over a decade and their best record since 2006.

== Departures ==
Player	Position	Nationality	Cause
Jonathan Balah	Defenseman	Canada	Transferred to Oswego State
Liam Connors	Forward	United States	Left program (retired)
Grayson Constable	Forward	Canada	Graduate transfer to Long Island
Nick Hale	Defenseman	United States	Graduate transfer to Ferris State
Conner Jean	Forward	United States	Graduation (signed with Fort Wayne Komets)
Jackson MacNab	Forward	United States	Graduation (retired)
Alex Peterson	Forward	United States	Graduate transfer to Massachusetts Lowell
Bobby Young	Forward	Canada	Graduation (signed with Hull Seahawks)

== Recruiting ==
Player	Position	Nationality	Age	Notes
Will Elias	Defenseman	United States	20	Weston, MA
Brody Gagno	Defenseman	Canada	21	South Surrey, BC
Ty Gagno	Forward	Canada	19	Langley, BC
Michael Hodge	Forward	Canada	23	Calgary, AB; transfer from Union
Nick Petruolo	Defenseman	United States	23	Neschanic, NJ; transfer from Union
Jack Stockfish	Forward	Canada	21	North Bay, ON
Will Troutwine	Defenseman	United States	21	Eveleth, MN
Connor Welsh	Forward	United States	19	Greenwich, CT

== Roster ==
As of September 14, 2023.

No.	Nat.	Player	Class	Pos	Height	Weight	DoB	Hometown	Previous team	NHL rights
1	(United States)	Louden Hogg	Sophomore	G	5' 11" (1.8 m)	160 lb (73 kg)	2002-10-18	Cheyenne, Wyoming	Fargo (USHL)	—
2	(United States)	Jack Robilotti (A)	Senior	D	6' 3" (1.91 m)	195 lb (88 kg)	2001-07-18	New York, New York	Fargo (USHL)	—
3	(Canada)	Brody Gagno	Freshman	D	6' 1" (1.85 m)	190 lb (86 kg)	2002-07-29	South Surrey, British Columbia	Surrey (BCHL)	—
4	(United States)	Jake Higgins (A)	Senior	D	6' 2" (1.88 m)	205 lb (93 kg)	2001-06-09	Hingham, Massachusetts	Deerfield (USHS–MA)	—
5	(United States)	Will Troutwine	Freshman	D	6' 3" (1.91 m)	215 lb (98 kg)	2002-06-23	Eveleth, Minnesota	Janesville (NAHL)	—
8	(United States)	Charlie Spence	Sophomore	D	6' 0" (1.83 m)	185 lb (84 kg)	2002-03-18	Medfield, Massachusetts	Boston Jr. Bruins (NCDC)	—
10	(United States)	Liam McLinskey	Junior	F	6' 3" (1.91 m)	165 lb (75 kg)	2001-02-20	Pearl River, New York	Quinnipiac (ECAC)	—
12	(United States)	Matt Guerra	Senior	F	5' 8" (1.73 m)	165 lb (75 kg)	1999-05-21	Orlando, Florida	Robert Morris (AHA)	—
13	(United States)	Will Elias	Freshman	D	6' 0" (1.83 m)	180 lb (82 kg)	2003-01-28	Weston, Massachusetts	Cowichan Valley (BCHL)	—
14	(Canada)	Matt Shatsky	Junior	D	6' 0" (1.83 m)	180 lb (82 kg)	2001-04-29	Winnipeg, Manitoba	Sherwood Park (AJHL)	—
15	(Canada)	Jack Ricketts (C)	Senior	F	6' 1" (1.85 m)	195 lb (88 kg)	1999-09-08	Oakville, Ontario	Oakville (OJHL)	—
17	(United States)	Matt DeBoer	Sophomore	F	6' 0" (1.83 m)	185 lb (84 kg)	2002-09-02	Las Vegas, Nevada	Green Bay (USHL)	—
18	(Canada)	Ty Gagno	Freshman	F	6' 2" (1.88 m)	185 lb (84 kg)	2003-10-01	Langley, British Columbia	Prince George (BCHL)	—
19	(Canada)	Jack Stockfish	Freshman	F	6' 4" (1.93 m)	215 lb (98 kg)	2002-09-30	North Bay, Ontario	Prince George (BCHL)	—
20	(United States)	Devin Phillips	Sophomore	F	5' 9" (1.75 m)	170 lb (77 kg)	2001-07-12	Raleigh, North Carolina	Brooks (AJHL)	—
21	(United States)	Alec Cicero	Senior	F	5' 10" (1.78 m)	180 lb (82 kg)	2001-03-09	Williamsville, New York	Buffalo (OJHL)	—
22	(Canada)	Lucas Thorne	Senior	F	6' 0" (1.83 m)	185 lb (84 kg)	1999-03-05	Dunnville, Ontario	Bonnyville (AJHL)	—
24	(United States)	John Gelatt	Junior	F	5' 11" (1.8 m)	195 lb (88 kg)	2001-04-29	Middletown, New Jersey	Johnstown (NAHL)	—
27	(United States)	Mack Oliphant	Sophomore	D	6' 3" (1.91 m)	195 lb (88 kg)	2002-12-28	Northbrook, Illinois	Johnstown (NAHL)	—
28	(Canada)	Jack Seymour	Sophomore	F	5' 11" (1.8 m)	160 lb (73 kg)	2001-04-06	Chelsea, Quebec	Chilliwack (BCHL)	—
29	(United States)	Conner Welsh	Freshman	F	5' 11" (1.8 m)	175 lb (79 kg)	2004-01-02	Greenwich, Connecticut	Vernon (BCHL)	—
30	(United States)	Jason Grande	Sophomore	G	6' 3" (1.91 m)	200 lb (91 kg)	1999-02-07	West Chester, Pennsylvania	Bentley (AHA)	—
33	(Canada)	Thomas Gale	Junior	G	6' 1" (1.85 m)	180 lb (82 kg)	2000-06-10	Kirkland, Quebec	P. A. L. (NCDC)	—
34	(United States)	Joe Solimine	Sophomore	F	5' 8" (1.73 m)	165 lb (75 kg)	2002-03-03	Middleton, Massachusetts	Boston Jr. Bruins (NCDC)	—
37	(United States)	Nic Petruolo	Junior (RS)	D	6' 2" (1.88 m)	195 lb (88 kg)	2000-01-29	Neshanic Station, New Jersey	Union (ECAC)	—
39	(Canada)	Tyler Ghirardosi (A)	Senior	F	6' 3" (1.91 m)	185 lb (84 kg)	1999-10-01	Montrose, British Columbia	Quinnipiac (ECAC)	—
40	(Canada)	Michael Hodge	Junior	F	5' 8" (1.73 m)	157 lb (71 kg)	2000-05-30	Calgary, Alberta	Union (ECAC)	—

== Standings ==
2023–24 Atlantic Hockey Standings
	Conference record										Overall record					
	GP	W	L	T	OW	OL	SW	PTS	GF	GA	GP	W	L	T	GF	GA
#17 RIT †*	26	18	7	1	3	2	0	54	102	64	40	27	11	2	156	96
Holy Cross	26	13	10	3	0	3	1	46	78	62	39	21	14	4	116	93
Sacred Heart	26	14	10	2	2	2	1	45	75	70	36	14	19	3	91	113
Air Force	26	15	10	1	3	0	1	44	88	75	38	18	19	1	115	119
American International	26	12	10	4	1	1	2	42	79	68	40	20	16	4	119	111
Bentley	26	12	12	2	1	2	2	41	69	58	35	16	17	2	95	82
Niagara	26	13	10	3	3	1	1	41	78	79	39	18	18	3	111	122
Canisius	26	10	12	4	2	1	0	33	73	87	37	12	21	4	103	126
Mercyhurst	26	7	15	4	0	1	4	30	77	91	35	9	22	4	98	126
Army	26	8	16	2	0	1	1	28	66	96	35	10	23	2	93	139
Robert Morris	26	7	17	2	0	1	1	25	60	95	39	11	25	3	94	142
Championship: March 23, 2024 † indicates conference regular season champion (DeGregorio Trophy) * indicates conference tournament champion (Riley Trophy); Rankings: USCHO.com Top 20 Poll

== Schedule and results ==
Date	Time	Opponent^{#}	Rank^{#}	Site	TV	Decision	Result	Attendance	Record
Regular Season
October 8	7:00 pm	Long Island*		Hart Center • Worcester, Massachusetts	FloHockey	Grande	W 5–2	830	1–0–0
October 13	7:00 pm	#20 Connecticut*		Hart Center • Worcester, Massachusetts	FloHockey, NESN+	Grande	W 2–1	1,100	2–0–0
October 14	7:00 pm	at #20 Connecticut*		Toscano Family Ice Forum • Storrs, Connecticut	ESPN+	Grande	W 2–0	2,296	3–0–0
October 20	7:00 pm	at Robert Morris		Clearview Arena • Neville Township, Pennsylvania	FloHockey	Grande	W 3–1	807	4–0–0 (1–0–0)
October 21	5:00 pm	at Robert Morris		Clearview Arena • Neville Township, Pennsylvania	FloHockey	Grande	T 3–3 ^{SOL}	604	4–0–1 (1–0–1)
October 27	7:00 pm	RIT		Hart Center • Worcester, Massachusetts	FloHockey	Grande	L 2–3 ^{OT}	923	4–1–1 (1–1–1)
October 28	7:00 pm	RIT		Hart Center • Worcester, Massachusetts	FloHockey	Grande	L 2–3	979	4–2–1 (1–2–1)
November 3	7:00 pm	at Canisius		LECOM Harborcenter • Buffalo, New York	FloHockey	Grande	L 3–5	826	4–3–1 (1–3–1)
November 4	7:00 pm	at Canisius		LECOM Harborcenter • Buffalo, New York	FloHockey	Gale	T 3–3 ^{SOW}	1,152	4–3–2 (1–3–2)
November 9	7:05 pm	at American International		MassMutual Center • Springfield, Massachusetts	FloHockey	Gale	L 1–4	352	4–4–2 (1–4–2)
November 10	7:05 pm	American International		Hart Center • Worcester, Massachusetts	FloHockey	Gale	L 2–3	631	4–5–2 (1–5–2)
November 17	7:00 pm	Bentley		Hart Center • Worcester, Massachusetts	FloHockey	Gale	W 2–0	817	5–5–2 (2–5–2)
November 17	4:05 pm	at Bentley		Bentley Arena • Waltham, Massachusetts	FloHockey	Gale	W 2–0	775	6–5–2 (3–5–2)
November 21	7:00 pm	Army		Hart Center • Worcester, Massachusetts	FloHockey	Gale	L 2–3	807	6–6–2 (3–6–2)
November 24	7:00 pm	Brown*		Hart Center • Worcester, Massachusetts	FloHockey	Grande	W 6–3	647	7–6–2
December 1	7:00 pm	Niagara		Hart Center • Worcester, Massachusetts	FloHockey	Gale	L 2–3 ^{OT}	737	7–7–2 (3–7–2)
December 2	4:00 pm	Niagara		Hart Center • Worcester, Massachusetts	FloHockey	Grande	W 4–1	807	8–7–2 (4–7–2)
December 8	7:15 pm	at Massachusetts Lowell*		Tsongas Center • Lowell, Massachusetts	ESPN+	Grande	T 2–2 ^{OT}	4,783	8–7–3
December 9	7:00 pm	Massachusetts Lowell*		Hart Center • Worcester, Massachusetts	FloHockey	Gale	W 4–2	1,008	9–7–3
December 30	7:00 pm	at #3 Quinnipiac*		M&T Bank Arena • Hamden, Connecticut	ESPN+	Gale	L 2–5	3,312	9–8–3
January 2	7:00 pm	Merrimack*		Hart Center • Worcester, Massachusetts	FloHockey	Gale	L 3–4 ^{OT}	714	9–9–3
January 5	1:05 pm	at American International		MassMutual Center • Springfield, Massachusetts	FloHockey	Gale	T 3–3 ^{SOL}	179	9–9–4 (4–7–3)
January 6	7:05 pm	American International		Hart Center • Worcester, Massachusetts	FloHockey	Gale	W 6–2	589	10–9–4 (5–7–3)
January 12	7:00 pm	at Army		Tate Rink • West Point, New York	FloHockey	Gale	L 0–3	1,625	10–10–4 (5–8–3)
January 13	4:00 pm	at Army		Tate Rink • West Point, New York	FloHockey	Gale	W 3–1	2,269	11–10–4 (6–8–3)
January 19	7:00 pm	at Sacred Heart		Martire Family Arena • Fairfield, Connecticut	FloHockey	Gale	L 1–2 ^{OT}	3,817	11–11–4 (6–9–3)
January 20	7:00 pm	Sacred Heart		Hart Center • Worcester, Massachusetts	FloHockey	Gale	W 5–2	824	12–11–4 (7–9–3)
January 26	7:00 pm	at Mercyhurst		Mercyhurst Ice Center • Erie, Pennsylvania	FloHockey	Gale	W 5–2	1,034	13–11–4 (8–9–3)
January 27	5:00 pm	at Mercyhurst		Mercyhurst Ice Center • Erie, Pennsylvania	FloHockey	Gale	W 5–3	1,074	14–11–4 (9–9–3)
February 2	7:00 pm	Air Force		Hart Center • Worcester, Massachusetts	FloHockey	Grande	W 6–3	1,906	15–11–4 (10–9–3)
February 3	7:00 pm	Air Force		Hart Center • Worcester, Massachusetts	FloHockey	Grande	W 5–2	1,812	16–11–4 (11–9–3)
February 16	7:00 pm	Sacred Heart		Hart Center • Worcester, Massachusetts	FloHockey	Grande	W 5–1	1,368	17–11–4 (12–9–3)
February 17	7:00 pm	at Sacred Heart		Martire Family Arena • Fairfield, Connecticut	FloHockey	Grande	W 2–1	3,688	18–11–4 (13–9–3)
February 22	7:00 pm	Bentley		Hart Center • Worcester, Massachusetts	FloHockey	Grande	L 1–5	1,167	18–12–4 (13–10–3)
Atlantic Hockey Tournament
March 8	7:00 pm	Canisius*		Hart Center • Worcester, Massachusetts (Quarterfinal Game 1)	FloHockey	Grande	W 4–3	444	19–12–4
March 9	7:00 pm	Canisius*		Hart Center • Worcester, Massachusetts (Quarterfinal Game 2)	FloHockey	Grande	W 2–1 ^{2OT}	559	20–12–4
March 15	7:00 pm	American International*		Hart Center • Worcester, Massachusetts (Semifinal Game 1)	FloHockey	Grande	W 5–2	796	21–12–4
March 16	7:00 pm	American International*		Hart Center • Worcester, Massachusetts (Semifinal Game 2)	FloHockey	Grande	L 0–3	787	21–13–4
March 17	5:00 pm	American International*		Hart Center • Worcester, Massachusetts (Semifinal Game 3)	FloHockey	Grande	L 1–3	656	21–14–4
*Non-conference game. ^{#}Rankings from USCHO.com Poll. All times are in Eastern Time. Source:

== Scoring statistics ==
Name	Position	Games	Goals	Assists	Points	PIM
Liam McLinskey	F	39	19	28	47	32
Jack Ricketts	C	39	19	16	35	78
Tyler Ghirardosi	F	39	14	13	27	23
Jack Stockfish	C	32	9	16	25	10
Matt Guerra	F	38	8	17	25	51
Matt Shatsky	D	37	2	19	21	28
Matt DeBoer	W	39	4	15	19	65
Alec Cicero	F	39	11	7	18	35
Jack Seymour	RW	37	5	10	15	25
John Gelatt	F	38	6	7	13	20
Ty Gagno	F	33	3	10	13	16
Mack Oliphant	D	38	2	8	10	19
Jake Higgins	D	31	5	4	9	17
Jack Robilotti	D	35	3	6	9	35
Lucas Thorne	C	33	2	6	8	20
Joe Solimine	C	32	3	3	6	26
Michael Hodge	F	33	0	4	4	18
Devin Phillips	F	5	1	2	3	2
Brody Gagno	D	38	0	3	3	14
William Troutwine	D	18	0	2	2	2
Nic Petruolo	D	37	0	2	2	39
Charlie Spence	D	14	0	1	1	4
Connor Welsh	F	13	0	1	1	4
Jason Grande	G	22	0	0	0	0
Thomas Gale	G	19	0	0	0	0
Will Elias	D	1	0	0	0	10
Total			116	200	316	583

== Goaltending statistics ==
Name	Games	Minutes	Wins	Losses	Ties	Goals against	Saves	Shut outs	SV %	GAA
Jason Grande	22	1280:38	13	6	2	43	551	1	.928	2.01
Thomas Gale	19	1093:31	8	8	2	44	485	2	.917	2.41
Empty Net	-	17:49	-	-	-	6	-	-	-	-
Total	39	2391:58	21	14	4	93	1036	3	.918	2.33

== Rankings ==
Poll	Week																										
Poll	Pre	1	2	3	4	5	6	7	8	9	10	11	12	13	14	15	16	17	18	19	20	21	22	23	24	25	26 (Final)
USCHO.com	NR	NR	NR	NR	NR	NR	NR	NR	NR	NR	NR	–	NR	NR	NR	NR	NR	NR	NR	NR	NR	NR	NR	NR	NR	–	NR
USA Hockey	NR	NR	NR	NR	NR	NR	NR	NR	NR	NR	NR	NR	–	NR	NR	NR	NR	NR	NR	NR	NR	NR	NR	NR	NR	NR	NR

Note: USCHO did not release a poll in weeks 11 and 25.
Note: USA Hockey did not release a poll in week 12.

== Awards and honors ==
Player	Award	Ref
Liam McLinskey	AHCA East Second Team All-American	
Liam McLinskey	Atlantic Hockey Player of the Year	
Liam McLinskey	Atlantic Hockey Regular Season Scoring Trophy	
Jason Grande	Atlantic Hockey Regular Season Goaltending Award	
Liam McLinskey	Atlantic Hockey First Team	
Jason Grande	Atlantic Hockey Second Team	
Jack Ricketts	Atlantic Hockey Second Team	
Jack Stockfish	Atlantic Hockey Rookie Team	
