= 2024 Atlantic Hockey men's ice hockey tournament =

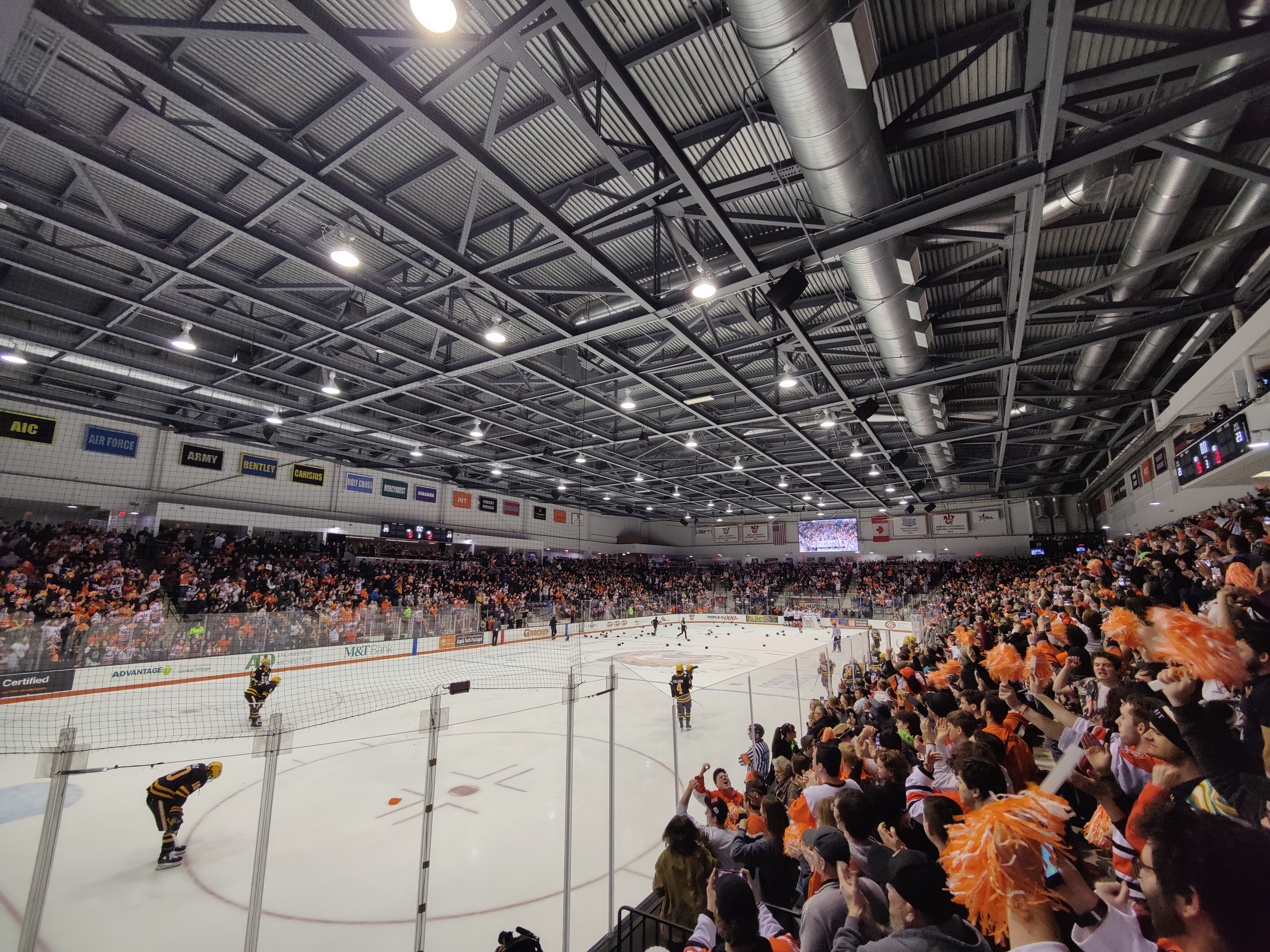
- The Gene Polisseni Center during RIT's Championship Game victory
- Dates: March 2–23, 2024
- Teams: 11
- Finals site: Gene Polisseni Center; Henrietta, New York
- Champions: RIT (4th title)
- Winning coach: Wayne Wilson (4th title)
- MVP: Elijah Gonsalves (RIT)
- Atlantic Hockey men's Ice Hockey Tournaments

The 2024 Atlantic Hockey Tournament was the 20th edition of the Atlantic Hockey Tournament. It was played between March 2 and March 23, 2024. The RIT Tigers defeated the AIC Yellow Jackets in the championship game, earning Atlantic Hockey's automatic bid to the 2024 NCAA Division I men's ice hockey tournament.

== Format ==
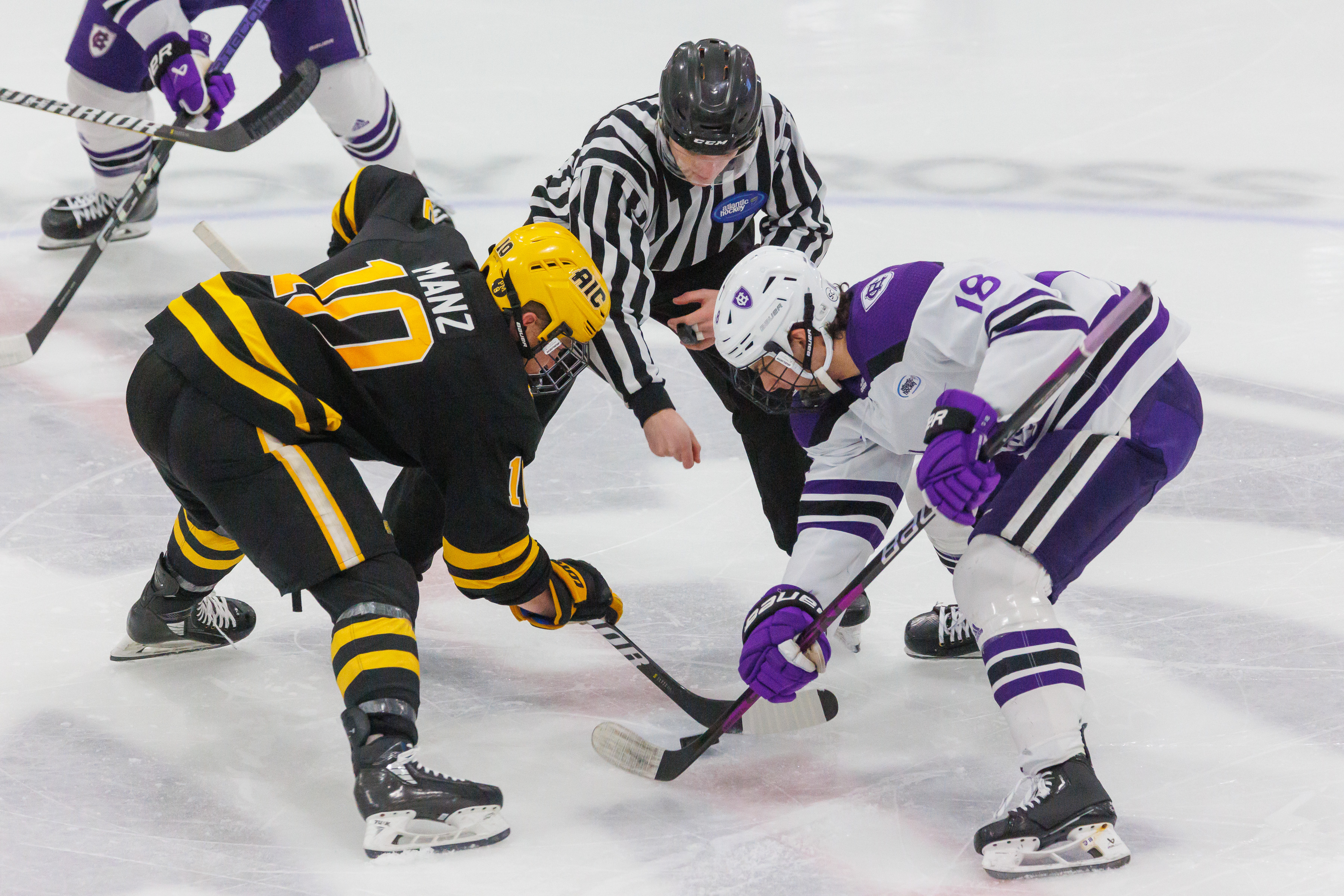
AIC faces off against Holy Cross in AHA Semifinals Game 1

The tournament featured four rounds of play, with eleven conference teams participating. The top five teams, according to the conference standings, received byes to the quarterfinal round. The remaining six teams were arranged so that the sixth seed played the eleventh seed, the seventh seed played the tenth seed and the eighth seed played the ninth seed in first round matches. The winners of the first-round games were reseeded entering the quarterfinal round and became the final three participants in the round, with the new eighth-, seventh-, and sixth-seeded teams facing the first-, second-, and third-place teams respectively, in addition to the fourth- and fifth-overall seeds playing each other. The winners of the quarterfinal round werere then reseeded so that the top remaining seed played the lowest remaining seed while the other two semifinalists met. The winners of the semifinal matches advanced to the championship to determine which team received the conference's automatic bid to the 2024 NCAA Division I men's ice hockey tournament. The quarterfinal and semifinal rounds are best-of-three series while the championship and first round matches are single elimination. All matchups were hosted by the higher-seeded team.

== Conference standings ==
2023–24 Atlantic Hockey Standings
	Conference record										Overall record					
	GP	W	L	T	OW	OL	SW	PTS	GF	GA	GP	W	L	T	GF	GA
#17 RIT †*	26	18	7	1	3	2	0	54	102	64	40	27	11	2	156	96
Holy Cross	26	13	10	3	0	3	1	46	78	62	39	21	14	4	116	93
Sacred Heart	26	14	10	2	2	2	1	45	75	70	36	14	19	3	91	113
Air Force	26	15	10	1	3	0	1	44	88	75	38	18	19	1	115	119
American International	26	12	10	4	1	1	2	42	79	68	40	20	16	4	119	111
Bentley	26	12	12	2	1	2	2	41	69	58	35	16	17	2	95	82
Niagara	26	13	10	3	3	1	1	41	78	79	39	18	18	3	111	122
Canisius	26	10	12	4	2	1	0	33	73	87	37	12	21	4	103	126
Mercyhurst	26	7	15	4	0	1	4	30	77	91	35	9	22	4	98	126
Army	26	8	16	2	0	1	1	28	66	96	35	10	23	2	93	139
Robert Morris	26	7	17	2	0	1	1	25	60	95	39	11	25	3	94	142
Championship: March 23, 2024 † indicates conference regular season champion (DeGregorio Trophy) * indicates conference tournament champion (Riley Trophy); Rankings: USCHO.com Top 20 Poll

== Bracket ==
Teams are reseeded for the semifinals

First Round; March 2
6	Bentley	3
11	Robert Morris	4*
7	Niagara	4
10	Army	1
8	Canisius	5
9	Mercyhurst	2

Quarterfinals; March 8–10
1	RIT	7	5	-
11	Robert Morris	0	1	-
2	Holy Cross	4	2**	-
8	Canisius	3	1	-
3	Sacred Heart	3	1	-
7	Niagara	6	5	-
4	Air Force	1	2	-
5	American International	3	3*	-

Semifinals; March 15–17
1	RIT	4	5	-
7	Niagara	1	2	-
2	Holy Cross	5	0	1
5	American International	2	3	3

Championship; March 23
1	RIT	5
5	American International	2

Note: * denotes overtime period(s)

== Results ==
Note: All game times are local.

=== First Round ===
==== (6) Bentley vs. (11) Robert Morris ====
March 2, 2024; 7:00 pm	Bentley	3–4 (OT) (0–1, 1–2, 2–0, 0–1)	Robert Morris	Bentley Arena; Attendance: 1,678

Game reference

Connor Hasley
Goalies
Chad Veltri
Referees:
William McGoldrick III
Andy O'Brien
Linesmen:
Cameron Carlson
Patrick Philbin

	0–1	12:28 – PP – Tanner Klimpke (14) (Zacher, Townend)
(Castagna, Bochen) Ethan Leyh (13) – 20:49	1–1
	1–2	31:20 – PP – Luke Johnson (2) (St. Onge, Reineke)
	1–3	35:39 – Rylee St. Onge (11) (Tulik)
(Davis, Kramer) Garrett Horsager (2) – 44:53	2–3
(Horsager, Castagna) Nick Bochen (6) – PP – 49:24	3–3
	3–4	79:50 – GW – Cameron Garvey (11) (unasssited)

10 min
Penalties
8 min
32
Shots
32

==== (7) Niagara vs. (10) Army ====
March 2, 2024; 7:00 pm	Niagara	4–1 (1–1, 1–0, 2–0)	Army	Dwyer Arena; Attendance: 710

Game reference

Jarrett Fiske
Goalies
Gavin Abric
Referees:
Ron Morello
Brendan Blanchard
Linesmen:
Brian Kimmins
Joe Gladnick

(unassisted) Jack Richard (8) – 11:30	1–0
	1–1	15:15 – PP – Joey Baez (14) (Driscoll, Itagaki)
(Prohorenkovs, Gauthier) Noah Carlin (3) – GW – 35:59	2–1
(Randklev) Tyler Wallace (11) – 42:05	3–1
(Ott, Carlin) Connor Mylymok (6) – EN – 58:19	4–1

21 min
Penalties
6 min
24
Shots
43

==== (8) Canisius vs. (9) Mercyhurst ====
March 2, 2024; 6:05 pm	Canisius	5–2 (2–0, 2–0, 1–2)	Mercyhurst	LECOM Harborcenter; Attendance: 388

Game reference

David Fessenden
Goalies
Owen Say
Referees:
Mark Dungan
Ryan Sweeney
Linesmen:
Joe Sherman
James Rogowsky

(Bottini, Haskins) Erik Urbank (4) – 11:54	1–0
(Giampa, Connor) Griffin Loughran (6) – 17:31	2–0
(unassisted) Kyle Haskins (4) – GW – 35:47	3–0
(Fessenden) Stefano Bottini (4) – 38:05	4–0
	4–1	50:29 – PP EA – Keanan Stewart (10) (Skalos, Sambrook)
	4–2	57:14 – PP EA – Will Margel (6) (Dahm)
(unassisted) Powell Connor (1) – SH EN – 58:09	5–2

25 min
Penalties
2 min
30
Shots
24

=== Quarterfinals ===
==== (1) RIT vs. (11) Robert Morris ====
March 8, 2024; 7:05 pm	RIT	7–0 (0–0, 1–0, 6–0)	Robert Morris	Gene Polisseni Center; Attendance: 2,988

Game reference

Tommy Scarfone
Goalies
Chad Veltri out 53:02
Francis Boisvert in 53:02
Referees:
CJ Hallman
Anthony Kenny
Linesmen:
Brendan Lewis
Joe Sherman

(Laskosky, Cassaro) Matthew Wilde (16) – GW PP – 32:37	1–0
(Moretz, Stewart) Tyler Fukakusa (6) – 42:14	2–0
(Andrew, Jacques) Gianfranco Cassaro (15) – 48:37	3–0
(Laskosky, Hansen-Bukata) Carter Wilkie (15) – PP – 51:56	4–0
(Wilde) Christian Catalano (8) – 53:02	5–0
(Gonsalves, Mahan) Tyler Fukakusa (7) – 56:34	6–0
(Fukakusa, Gonsalves) Grady Hobbs (10) – PP – 58:09	7–0

6 min
Penalties
8 min
44
Shots
21

March 9, 2024; 7:05 pm	RIT	5–1 (2–0, 2–0, 1–1)	Robert Morris	Gene Polisseni Center; Attendance: 3,248

Game reference

Tommy Scarfone
Goalies
Chad Veltri out 31:14
Francis Boisvert in 31:14
Referees:
CJ Hallman
Anthony Kenny
Linesmen:
Brendan Lewis
Joe Sherman

(Scott, Hobbs) Simon Isabelle (8) – 14:22	1–0
(Catalano, Wilde) Tyler Fukakusa (8) – GW – 19:56	2–0
(Fukakusa) Christian Catalano (9) – 20:57	3–0
(Fukakusa, Andrew) Xavier Lapointe (2) – 28:12	4–0
	4–1	51:35 – Tanner Klimpke (15) (Zacher)
(Wilkie, Gonsalves) Gianfranco Cassaro (16) – 54:35	5–1

8 min
Penalties
29 min
49
Shots
18

RIT wins series 2–0

==== (2) Holy Cross vs. (8) Canisius ====
March 8, 2024; 7:00 pm	Holy Cross	4–3 (0–1, 2–2, 2–0)	Canisius	Hart Center; Attendance: 444

Game reference

Jason Grande
Goalies
David Fessenden
Referees:
Conor Foley
Patrick Philbin
Linesmen:
Ryan Sweeney
William McGoldrick III

	0–1	11:23 – Max Kouznetsov (7) (Bottini, Haar)
(McLinskey) Jack Ricketts (19) – 23:24	1–1
	1–2	24:36 – PP – Max Kouznetsov (8) (Giampa, Melaragni)
	1–3	33:49 – Trey Funk (7) (Haar, Farthing)
(Stockfish, Ghirardosi) Matt Shatsky (2) – 35:41	2–3
(Seymour, Higgins) Liam McLinskey (16) – 49:02	3–3
(McLinskey, Guerra) Jack Stockfish (9) – GW PP – 50:04	4–3

2 min
Penalties
4 min
46
Shots
28

March 9, 2024; 7:00 pm	Holy Cross	2–1 (2 OT) (0–1, 1–0, 0–0, 0–0, 1–0)	Canisius	Hart Center; Attendance: 559

Game reference

Jason Grande
Goalies
Ethan Robertson
Referees:
Ryan Sweeney
William McGoldrick III
Linesmen:
Conor Foley
Patrick Philbin

	0–1	11:23 – Grant Porter (7) (Nieuwendyk, Datema)
(Thorne, Gagno) Jack Robilotti (3) – 23:24	1–1
(McLinskey, Ricketts) Jack Seymour (5) – GW – 82:53	2–1

12 min
Penalties
6 min
42
Shots
39

Holy Cross wins series 2–0

==== (3) Sacred Heart vs. (7) Niagara ====
March 8, 2024; 7:00 pm	Sacred Heart	3–6 (1–0, 1–1, 1–5)	Niagara	Martire Family Arena; Attendance: 2,354

Game reference

Justin Robbins
Goalies
Jarrett Fiske
Referees:
Brendan Blanchard
Chris Leavitt
Linesmen:
Dylan Lewis
Josh Cleary

(Walsh, Jaworski) Braeden Tuck (5) – PP – 14:09	1–0
(Walsh, Joughin) Kevin Lombardi (11) – 24:05	2–0
	2–1	33:26 – Tyler Wallace (14) (Randklev, Ahearn)
	2–2	41:21 – Carter Randklev (9) (Ahearn, Carlin)
	2–3	41:51 – Carter Randklev (10) (Wallace, Carlin)
	2–4	42:04 – GW – Jonathan Ziskie (2) (Richard)
(Jaworski) Braeden Tuck (6) – 48:49	3–4
	3–5	49:58 – PP – Jack Richard (9) (Rødne)
	3–6	59:11 – EN – Glebs Prohorenkovs (11) (Gauthier)

8 min
Penalties
6 min
35
Shots
34

March 9, 2024; 7:00 pm	Sacred Heart	1–5 (1–0, 0–3, 0–2)	Niagara	Martire Family Arena; Attendance: 2,639

Game reference

Justin Robbins
Goalies
Jarrett Fiske
Referees:
Brendan Blanchard
Chris Leavitt
Linesmen:
Dylan Lewis
Josh Cleary

(Bongo) Daniel Ebrahim (9) – 00:19	1–0
	1–1	23:11 – Carter Randklev (11) (Wallace, Ahearn)
	1–2	34:32 – GW – Jay Ahearn (8) (Randklev, Wallace)
	1–3	35:19 – PP – Jay Ahearn (9) (Ott, Randklev)
	1–4	44:30 – PP – Jack Richard (10) (Prohorenkovs, Rødne)
	1–5	56:42 – EN – Lane Brockhoff (2) (C. Mylymok)

10 min
Penalties
18 min
37
Shots
21

Niagara wins series 2–0

==== (4) Air Force vs. (5) American International ====
March 8, 2024; 7:05 pm	Air Force	1–3 (0–1, 0–0, 1–2)	American International	Cadet Ice Arena; Attendance: 1,818

Game reference

Guy Blessing
Goalies
Nils Wallström
Referees:
Andy Bethmann
Ron Morello
Linesmen:
Seth Mukai
Joshua Pergande

	0–1	6:28 – PP – John Lundy (13) (Manz, Geschwind)
(unassisted) Andrew DeCarlo (5) – 51:18	1–1
	1–2	55:11 – GW – Josh Barnes (2) (Wells, Angesved)
	1–3	59:42 – Blake Wells (4) (McDonald)

2 min
Penalties
17 min
32
Shots
18

March 9, 2024; 7:05 pm	Air Force	2–3 (OT) (2–0, 0–0, 0–2, 0–1)	American International	Cadet Ice Arena; Attendance: 1,688

Game reference

Guy Blessing
Goalies
Nils Wallström
Referees:
Andy Bethmann
Ron Morello
Linesmen:
Seth Mukai
Joshua Pergande

(DeCarlo, Staring) Austin Schwartz (5) – 5:20	1–0
(Cosentino, Cunningham) Chris Hedden (8) – 17:16	2–0
	2–1	40:33 – Brett Callahan (13) (Biro, Janhonen)
	2–2	58:29 – EA – John Lundy (14) (Kramer, Biro)
	2–3	72:18 – GW – Nico Somerville (3) (Manz)

8 min
Penalties
6 min
40
Shots
38

American International wins series 2–0

=== Semifinals ===
==== (1) RIT vs. (7) Niagara ====
March 15, 2024; 7:05 pm	RIT	4–1 (1–0, 1–0, 2–1)	Niagara	Gene Polisseni Center; Attendance: 2,564

Game reference

Tommy Scarfone
Goalies
Jarrett Fiske
Referees:
Ron Morello
Ryan Sweeney
Linesmen:
Brian Kimmins
Joe Sherman

(Stewart, Gonsalves) Tyler Mahan (6) – 14:54	1–0
(Miller, Andrew) Aiden Hansen-Bukata (5) – GW – 26:49	2–0
(Catalano) Matthew Wilde (17) – 53:53	3–0
	3–1	51:35 – EA – Jay Ahearn (15) (Prohorenkovs, Wallace)
(unassisted) Gianfranco Cassaro (17) – EN – 59:53	4–1

10 min
Penalties
2 min
24
Shots
39

March 16, 2024; 7:05 pm	RIT	5–2 (3–0, 1–0, 1–2)	Niagara	Gene Polisseni Center; Attendance: 3,284

Game reference

Tommy Scarfone
Goalies
Jarrett Fiske
Referees:
Ron Morello
Ryan Sweeney
Linesmen:
Brian Kimmins
Joe Sherman

(Catalano, Wilde) Tyler Fukakusa (9) – 1:18	1–0
(Cassaro) Elijah Gonsalves (16) – 8:44	2–0
(unassisted) Carter Wilkie (16) – GW – 15:56	3–0
(Hobbs, Wilkie) Dimitri Mikrogiannakis (1) – 38:57	4–0
	4–1	47:25 – Shane Ott (5) (Richard)
	4–2	48:42 – PP – Tyler Wallace (13) (Randklev, Ahearn)
(Nicholson, Wilkie) Elijah Gonsalves (17) – EN – 56:44	5–2

4 min
Penalties
2 min
30
Shots
27

RIT Won Series 2–0

==== (2) Holy Cross vs. (5) American International ====
March 15, 2024; 7:00 pm	Holy Cross	5–2 (3–1, 0–1, 2–0)	American International	Hart Center; Attendance: 796

Game reference

Jason Grande
Goalies
Nils Wallström
Referees:
Brendan Blanchard
Chris Leavitt
Linesmen:
Conor Foley
Patrick Philbin

	0–1	2:31 – PP – Brett Rylance (4) (Jenuwine, Angesved)
(Higgins) Alec Cicero (10) – 14:22	1–1
(Stockfish, Petruolo) Tyler Ghirardosi (14) – 19:19	2–1
(Guerra, Stockfish) Liam McLinskey (17) – GW – 19:51	3–1
	3–2	21:26 – Casey McDonald (15) (Rylance)
(unassisted) Liam McLinskey (18) – EN – 58:24	4–2
(Higgins) Alec Cicero (11) – EN – 59:22	5–2

8 min
Penalties
8 min
23
Shots
24

March 16, 2024; 7:00 pm	Holy Cross	0–3 (0–1, 0–1, 0–1)	American International	Hart Center; Attendance: 787

Game reference

Jason Grande
Goalies
Nils Wallström
Referees:
Brendan Blanchard
Chris Leavitt
Linesmen:
Conor Foley
Patrick Philbin

0–1	13:35 – GW – Nico Somerville (4) (unassisted)
0–2	21:26 – PP – Brett Rylance (15) (Stella)
0–3	58:58 – EN – Brett Rylance (6) (unassisted)

9 min
Penalties
4 min
32
Shots
25

March 17, 2024; 5:00 pm	Holy Cross	1–3 (0–0, 1–2, 0–1)	American International	Hart Center; Attendance: 656

Game reference

Jason Grande
Goalies
Nils Wallström
Referees:
Brendan Blanchard
Chris Leavitt
Linesmen:
Conor Foley
Patrick Philbin

	0–1	24:37 – Theo Angesved (2) (unassisted)
	0–2	30:12 – GW – Dario Beljo (2) (Somerville, Lundy)
(Ricketts) Liam McLinskey (19) – 34:20	1–2
	1–3	57:48 – EN – Dustin Manz (6) (unassisted)

39 min
Penalties
20 min
45
Shots
17

American International Won Series 2–1

=== Championship ===
==== (1) RIT vs. (5) American International ====
March 23, 2024; 7:05 pm	RIT	5–2 (2–2, 1–0, 2–0)	American International	Gene Polisseni Center; Attendance: 4,233

Game reference

Tommy Scarfone
Goalies
Nils Wallström
Referees:
Brendan Blanchard
Ryan Sweeney
Linesmen:
Brendan Lewis
Joe Sherman

	0–1	4:06 – Jordan Biro (6) (Long)
(Fukakusa, Gonsalves) Dimitri Mikrogiannakis (2) – 11:56	1–1
(Wilkie, Mikrogiannakis) Elijah Gonsalves (18) – 16:06	2–1
	2–2	18:59 – Jordan Biro (7) (Kramer, Janhonen)
(Hansen-Bukata, Gonsalves) Matthew Wilde (16) – GW PP – 21:48	3–2
(unassisted) Elijah Gonsalves (19) – EN – 58:34	4–2
(Wilkie, Jeffery) Matthew Wilde (19) – EN – 59:08	5–2

10 min
Penalties
4 min
25
Shots
26

== Tournament awards ==
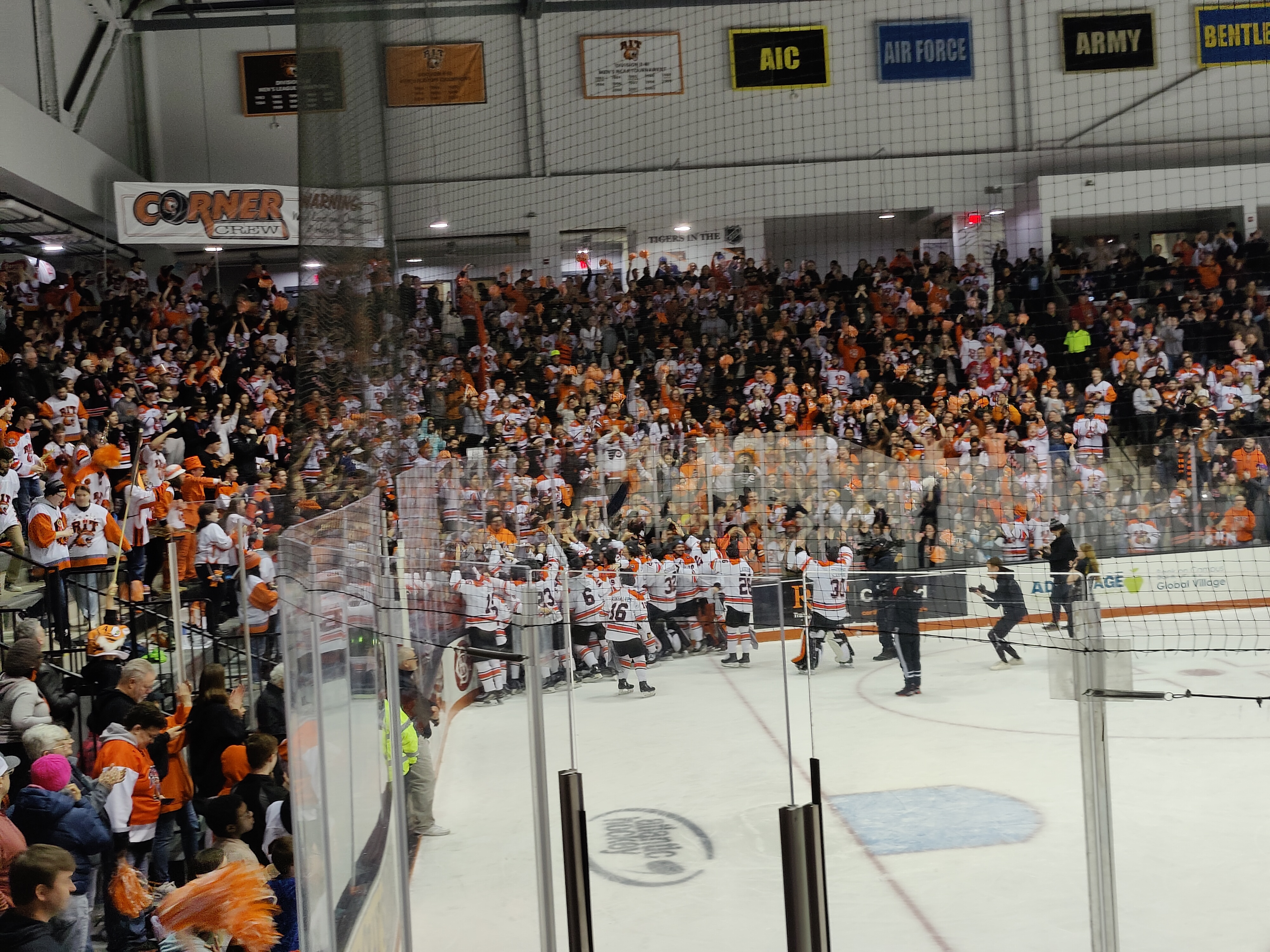
RIT celebrates after winning the AHA Championship Game

=== All-Tournament Team ===
- G: Tommy Scarfone (RIT)
- D: Gianfranco Cassaro (RIT)
- D: Nico Somerville (American International)
- F: Elijah Gonsalves* (RIT)
- F: Tyler Fukakusa (RIT)
- F: Jordan Biro (American International)

* Most Valuable Player(s)
