= Gianfranco Cassaro =

Canadian ice hockey player (born 1999)

- Cassaro with the Florida Everblades in 2026
- Born: March 30, 1999 (age 27) Nobleton, Ontario, Canada
- Height: 5 ft 11 in (180 cm)
- Weight: 187 lb (85 kg; 13 st 5 lb)
- Position: Defense
- Shoots: Left
- ECHL team Former teams: Florida Everblades; Lehigh Valley Phantoms
- NHL draft: Undrafted
- Playing career: 2024–present

Gianfranco "JoJo" Cassaro (born March 30, 1999) is a Canadian professional ice hockey defenseman for the Florida Everblades of the ECHL. He previously played college hockey for the UMass Minutemen and the RIT Tigers, and was named a Second Team All-American in 2023–24.

== Playing career ==
After playing for the Youngstown Phantoms in his final two years of junior hockey, Cassaro signed on to play for the UMass Minutemen after the team reached the NCAA championship for the first time. As a freshman, he was relegated to the third pair on defense. Though he scored just 3 points in 30 games, he was helping the team prepare for another run in the postseason when the season was ended abruptly. COVID-19 forced the entire playoff schedule to be abandoned and it was uncertain when Cassaro could resume his career. The 2020–21 season started late and saw many cancellations throughout the year. Despite this, UMass played a total of 29 games. Unfortunately, Cassaro was only in the lineup for 10 matches and he ended up going pointless for the entire season. While the Minutemen ran up a tremendous record and ended up winning a National Championship, Cassaro was not dressed for the championship game. With his career seemingly at a crossroads, Cassaro used the new NCAA transfer rules to move on to RIT and join the Tigers the following season.

Cassaro played all 38 games for the Tigers in his junior season. While his scoring numbers weren't outstanding, they were a distinct improvement over his time in Amherst. In his senior season, however, Cassaro found a new level to his game and broke out with a spectacular campaign. Cassaro quadrupled his point total and ended up scoring 14 goals over the course of the year. The pairing he made with Aiden Hansen-Bukata proved to be one of the most potent duos in the country and helped RIT win its first regular season Atlantic Hockey title in over a decade. While he was all-conference first team, Cassaro and the Tigers were stunned by Holy Cross in the semifinals to end their season.

Because of the COVID-19 pandemic, Cassaro was entitled to a fifth year and he remained in college for the 2023–24 season. He improved over his previous season by scoring at nearly a point-per-game pace. His 18 goals on the season was tops in the nation for defensemen as was his 8 power play goals. Cassaro was named as a second team All-American for the outstanding year. His abilities on both sides of the puck helped RIT repeat as regular season champions, and this time the Tigers ran through the conference tournament and won all five games by at least 3 goals to capture their first Atlantic Hockey championship since 2016. The tournament championship sent RIT to the NCAA tournament for the first time in eight years and set up a match with #2 Boston University. The Terriers scored twice in the first period but Cassaro helped to spur on the RIT comeback. He assisted on one goal and scored a second to twice get his team within 1 but the BU offense was just too much for the Tigers.

As an undrafted free agent, Cassaro turned professional for the 2024–25 season in signing a one-year AHL contract with the Lehigh Valley Phantoms, affiliate to the Philadelphia Flyers, on August 20, 2024.

== Career statistics ==
			Regular season					Playoffs
Season	Team	League	GP	G	A	Pts	PIM	GP	G	A	Pts	PIM
2017–18	Youngstown Phantoms	USHL	36	2	7	9	30	2	0	0	0	0
2018–19	Youngstown Phantoms	USHL	49	9	25	34	42	2	0	1	1	0
2019–20	U. of Massachusetts	HE	30	1	2	3	12	—	—	—	—	—
2020–21	U. of Massachusetts	HE	10	0	0	0	0	—	—	—	—	—
2021–22	RIT	AHA	38	3	5	8	29	—	—	—	—	—
2022–23	RIT	AHA	39	14	18	32	42	—	—	—	—	—
2023–24	RIT	AHA	40	18	20	38	28	—	—	—	—	—
2024–25	Reading Royals	ECHL	66	13	25	38	24	2	0	0	0	0
2024–25	Lehigh Valley Phantoms	AHL	1	0	0	0	0	—	—	—	—	—
NCAA totals			157	36	45	81	111	—	—	—	—	—

== Awards and honors ==
Award	Year
College
Atlantic Hockey First Team	2022–23
Atlantic Hockey First Team	2023–24
AHCA East Second Team All-American	2023–24
Atlantic Hockey All-Tournament Team	2024
