= Tommy Scarfone =

Canadian ice hockey player (born 2000)

- Scarfone with the University of Wisconsin in October 2024
- Born: November 19, 2000 (age 25) Montreal, Quebec, Canada
- Height: 6 ft 2 in (188 cm)
- Weight: 175 lb (79 kg; 12 st 7 lb)
- Position: Goaltender
- Catches: Left
- ECHL team: Cincinnati Cyclones

Thomas Louis Scarfone (born November 19, 2000) is a Canadian college ice hockey goaltender for the Cincinnati Cyclones of the ECHL. He previously played for RIT and Wisconsin.

== Playing career ==
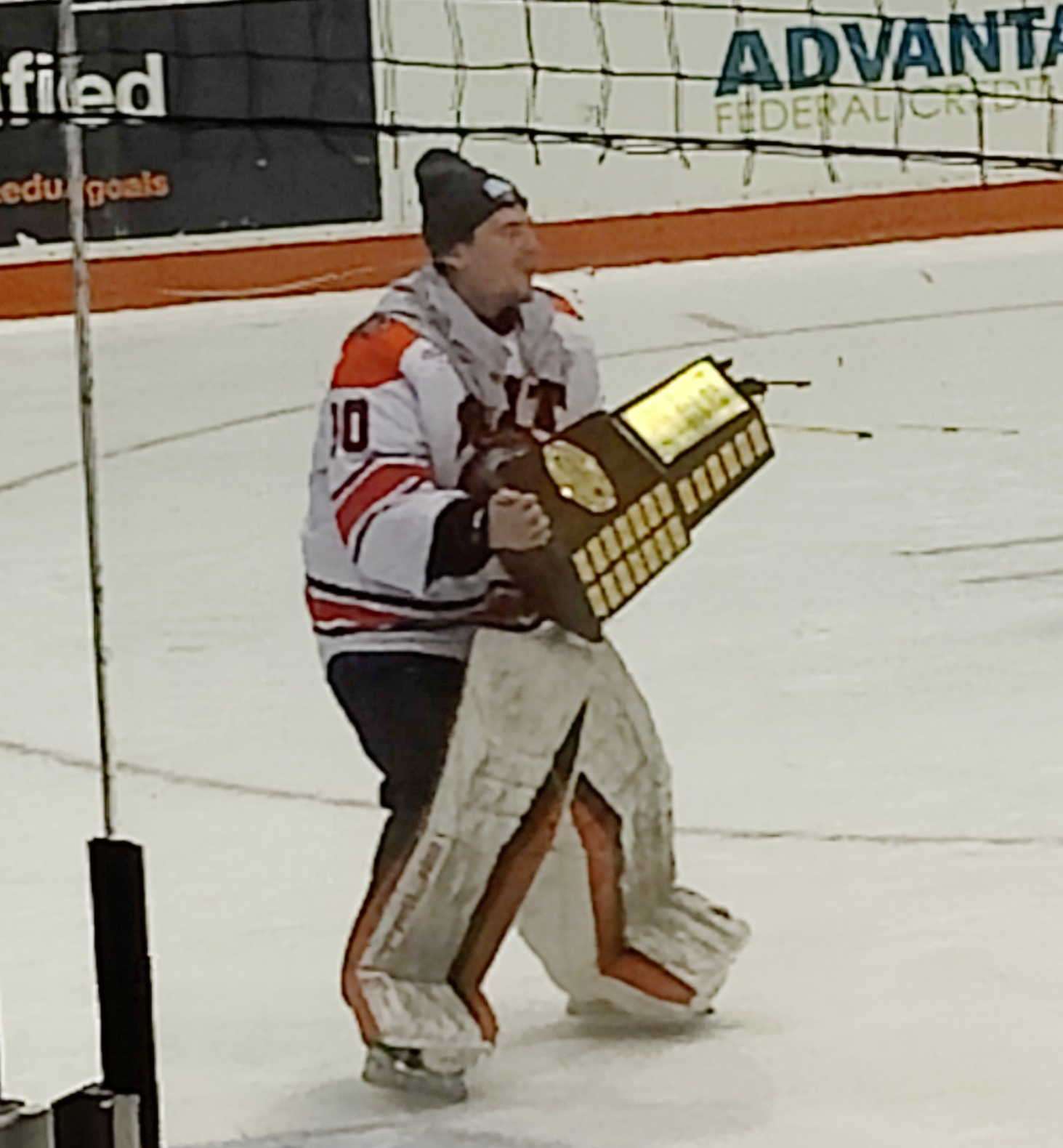
Scarfone with the Riley Trophy in March 2024

Scarfone began his college ice hockey at RIT during the 2021–22 season. During his freshman year he appeared in 20 games and posted an 8–9–1 record, with a 2.46 goals against average (GAA) and.918 save percentage. Following the season he was named to the All-Atlantic Hockey Rookie Team.

During the 2022–23 season, in his sophomore year, he appeared in 34 games and posted a 22–11–1 record, with a 2.41 GAA and.918 save percentage. He Broke RIT's single-season NCAA Division I era record with 934 saves, while his 22 wins were the second-most in program history, and ranked tied for fourth nationally. He was named the Atlantic Hockey Goaltender of the Week a league-high four times, and named the Goaltender of the Month for January. Following the season he was named to the All-Atlantic Hockey First Team.

During the 2023–24 season, in his junior year, he appeared in 36 games and posted a 25–9–2 record, with a 2.26 GAA, and.925 save percentage. His 25 wins were the second-most in program history, and ranked third nationally. He set a single-season program record with 1,015 saves. On January 26, 2024, with a 3–0 victory against Bentley, Scarfone earned his 44th win for the Tigers, becoming the all-time leader in wins at RIT during the Division I era. The Tigers clinched a first round bye in the 2024 Atlantic Hockey men's ice hockey tournament after defeating Air Force on February 16, 2024, and earned first place in the Atlantic Hockey regular season after Bentley defeated second place Holy Cross on February 22, 2024. This was the Tigers' second consecutive regular season championship. He helped lead RIT to the Riley Trophy as Atlantic Hockey tournament champions, and advanced to the NCAA tournament for the first time since 2016. Following an outstanding season, he was named to the All-Atlantic Hockey First Team for the second consecutive season, named the Atlantic Hockey Goaltender of the Year, and named a semifinalist for the Mike Richter Award.

On April 1, 2024, Scarfone entered the NCAA transfer portal. He finished his career at RIT with an overall record of 55–29–4, with a 2.36 GAA and.921 save percentage in 90 games. His 55 wins make him the winningest goaltender in Division I history at RIT, while he also ranked first overall in program history with 2,494 career saves. On April 8, 2024, he transferred to Wisconsin.

On December 6, 2025, Scarfone signed with the Cincinnati Cyclones of the ECHL.

== Personal life ==
Scarfone was born to Cesare Scarfone and Nathalie Arsenault, and has one brother, James.

== Career statistics ==
Season	Team	League	GP	W	L	T	MIN	GA	SO	GAA	SV%
2019–20	Surrey Eagles	BCHL	33	14	11	5	1,876	84	1	2.69	.920
2020–21	Surrey Eagles	BCHL	7	4	1	1	371	15	0	2.42	.918
2021–22	RIT	AHA	20	8	9	1	1,169	48	2	2.46	.919
2022–23	RIT	AHA	34	22	11	1	2,066	83	3	2.41	.918
2023–24	RIT	AHA	36	25	9	2	2,175	82	4	2.26	.925
2024–25	Wisconsin	Big 10	32	11	16	3	1,841	80	3	2.61	.900
NCAA totals			122	66	45	7	7,251	303	12	2.42	.917

== Awards and honors ==
Award	Year
College
All-Atlantic Hockey Rookie Team	2022
All-Atlantic Hockey First Team	2023
All-Atlantic Hockey First Team	2024
Atlantic Hockey Goaltender of the Year	2024

Awards and achievements
Preceded by Inaugural	Atlantic Hockey Goaltender of the Year; 2023–24	Succeeded by Incumbent
