= Atlantic Hockey Goaltender of the Year =

- Sport: Ice hockey
- Awarded for: The Goaltender of the Year in the Atlantic Hockey Association

History
- First award: 2024
- Final award: 2024
- Most recent: Tommy Scarfone

The Atlantic Hockey Goaltender of the Year was an annual award given out at the conclusion of the Atlantic Hockey regular season to the best goaltender in the conference as voted by the coaches of each Atlantic Hockey team. It was only awarded in 2024.

== Award winners ==
Year	Winner	School	Ref.
2024	Tommy Scarfone	RIT	

=== Winners by school ===
School	Winners
RIT	1

== See also ==
- Atlantic Hockey Awards
