= Dylan Peterson (ice hockey) =

American ice hockey player (born 2002)

- Born: January 8, 2002 (age 24) Roseville, California, United States
- Height: 6 ft 4 in (193 cm)
- Weight: 209 lb (95 kg; 14 st 13 lb)
- Position: Center
- Shoots: Right
- NHL team (P) Cur. team: St. Louis Blues; Springfield Thunderbirds (AHL)
- NHL draft: 86th overall, 2020; St. Louis Blues
- Playing career: 2024–present

Dylan Peterson (born January 8, 2002) is an American professional ice hockey center for the Springfield Thunderbirds in the American Hockey League (AHL) while under contract as a prospect to the St. Louis Blues of the National Hockey League (NHL).

== Career statistics ==
=== Regular season and playoffs ===
			Regular season					Playoffs
Season	Team	League	GP	G	A	Pts	PIM	GP	G	A	Pts	PIM
2017–18	Ottawa Jr. Senators	CCHL	5	0	0	0	2	—	—	—	—	—
2018–19	U.S. National Development Team	USHL	31	3	8	11	24	2	0	0	0	4
2019–20	U.S. National Development Team	USHL	19	4	7	11	22	—	—	—	—	—
2020–21	Boston University	HE	16	3	3	6	25	—	—	—	—	—
2021–22	Boston University	HE	29	10	6	16	18	—	—	—	—	—
2022–23	Boston University	HE	39	5	13	18	26	—	—	—	—	—
2023–24	Boston University	HE	35	8	12	20	73	—	—	—	—	—
2023–24	Springfield Thunderbirds	AHL	3	0	1	1	0	—	—	—	—	—
2024–25	Springfield Thunderbirds	AHL	52	13	9	22	82	2	0	1	1	4
2025–26	Springfield Thunderbirds	AHL	57	12	12	24	85	10	1	1	2	19
AHL totals			112	25	22	47	167	12	1	2	3	23

=== International ===
Year	Team	Event	Result	GP	G	A	Pts	PIM
2018	United States	U17	8th	5	2	2	4	0
Junior totals				5	2	2	4	0
