= List of American International Yellow Jackets men's ice hockey seasons =

This is a list of seasons completed by the American International College men's ice hockey team. The list documents the season-by-season records of the Yellow Jackets from 1948 to present, including postseason results.

AIC has won 3 conference championships, one as a Division I program, and made their first national tournament appearance in 2019.

== Season-by-season results ==
Note: GP = Games played, W = Wins, L = Losses, T = Ties

NCAA D-I Champions	NCAA Frozen Four	Conference regular season champions	Conference Playoff Champions

Season	Conference	Regular season (Note: Code explanation; GP—Games Played, W—Wins, L—Losses, T—Tied games, OTW—Overtime Wins, OTL—Overtime Loses, 3/SW—Win in 3 on 3 overtime or shootout, Pts—Points*)														Conference Tournament Results	National Tournament Results
Season	Conference	Conference									Overall					Conference Tournament Results	National Tournament Results
Season	Conference	GP	W	L	T	OTW	OTL	3/SW	Pts*	Finish	GP	W	L	T	%	Conference Tournament Results	National Tournament Results
William Turner (1948 — 1957)
1948–49	Independent	—	—	—	—	—	—	—	—	—	7	4	3	0	.571		
1949–50	Independent	—	—	—	—	—	—	—	—	—	12	6	5	1	.542		
1950–51	Independent	—	—	—	—	—	—	—	—	—	17	8	8	1	.500		
1951–52	Independent	—	—	—	—	—	—	—	—	—	13	8	5	0	.615		
1952–53	Independent	—	—	—	—	—	—	—	—	—	16	9	6	1	.594		
1953–54	Independent	—	—	—	—	—	—	—	—	—	15	5	10	0	.333		
1954–55	Independent	—	—	—	—	—	—	—	—	—	10	6	4	0	.600		
1955–56	Independent	—	—	—	—	—	—	—	—	—	15	11	4	0	.733		
1956–57	Independent	—	—	—	—	—	—	—	—	—	18	5	13	0	.278		
Joe Bucholz (1957 — 1964)
1957–58	Independent	—	—	—	—	—	—	—	—	—	18	4	14	0	.222		
1958–59	Independent	—	—	—	—	—	—	—	—	—	20	6	14	0	.300		
1959–60	Independent	—	—	—	—	—	—	—	—	—	15	6	9	0	.400		
1960–61	Independent	—	—	—	—	—	—	—	—	—	17	5	12	0	.294		
1961–62	ECAC Hockey	19	4	15	0	—	—	—	.211	26th	19	4	15	0	.211		
1962–63	ECAC Hockey	15	4	11	0	—	—	—	.267	24th	18	7	11	0	.389		
1963–64	ECAC Hockey	15	4	1	0	—	—	—	.267	25th	18	7	11	0	.389		
College Division
William Turner (1964 — 1970)
1964–65	ECAC 2	—	—	—	—	—	—	—	—	—	17	7	10	0	.412		
1965–66	ECAC 2	—	—	—	—	—	—	—	—	—	24	14	10	0	.583	Lost Semifinal, 1–4 (Merrimack)	
1966–67	ECAC 2	—	—	—	—	—	—	—	—	—	24	13	10	1	.563		
1967–68	ECAC 2	—	—	—	—	—	—	—	—	—	19	12	7	0	.632	Lost Semifinal, 1–6 (Merrimack)	
1968–69	ECAC 2	—	—	—	—	—	—	—	—	—	23	15	8	0	.652	Won Semifinal, Won Championship, 7–6 (Norwich)	
1969–70	ECAC 2	—	—	—	—	—	—	—	—	—	20	5	15	0	.250		
Wally Barlow (1970 — 1972)
1970–71	ECAC 2	—	—	—	—	—	—	—	—	—	21	8	12	1	.405		
1971–72	ECAC 2	—	—	—	—	—	—	—	—	—	20	9	11	0	.450		
Peter Esdale (1972 — 1974)
1972–73	ECAC 2	—	—	—	—	—	—	—	—	—	25	9	14	2	.400		
Division II
1973–74	ECAC 2	—	—	—	—	—	—	—	—	—	28	9	18	1	.339		
Paul Thornton (1974 — 1978)
1974–75	ECAC 2	—	—	—	—	—	—	—	—	—	26	14	12	0	.538		
1975–76	ECAC 2	—	—	—	—	—	—	—	—	—	24	16	8	0	.667		
1976–77	ECAC 2	—	—	—	—	—	—	—	—	—	24	18	6	0	.750	Lost Quarterfinal, 6–7 (OT) (Army)	
1977–78	ECAC 2	—	—	—	—	—	—	—	—	—	23	15	7	1	.674	Lost East Quarterfinal, 4–6 (Lowell)	
Wayne LeChance (1978 — 1982)
1978–79	ECAC 2	—	—	—	—	—	—	—	—	—	25	13	12	0	.520	Lost East Quarterfinal, 1–4 (Maine)	
1979–80	ECAC 2	—	—	—	—	—	—	—	—	—	27	14	13	0	.519		
1980–81	ECAC 2	—	—	—	—	—	—	—	—	—	24	12	12	0	.500		
1981–82	ECAC 2	—	—	—	—	—	—	—	—	—	27	7	20	0	.259		
Lincoln Flagg (1982 — 1984)
1982–83	ECAC 2	—	—	—	—	—	—	—	—	—	24	8	16	0	.333		
1983–84	ECAC 2	—	—	—	—	—	—	—	—	—	26	10	16	0	.385		
Division III
Gary Wright (1984 — 2016)
1984–85	ECAC East	—	—	—	—	—	—	—	—	—	31	16	15	0	.516		
1985–86	ECAC East	22	7	15	0	—	—	—	.318	—	31	11	19	1	.371		
1986–87	ECAC East	25	5	18	2	—	—	—	.240	—	30	9	19	2	.333		
1987–88	ECAC East	24	16	8	0	—	—	—	.667	6th	31	21	10	0	.677	Lost Quarterfinal, 3–4 (OT) (Bowdoin)	
1988–89	ECAC East	23	20	3	0	—	—	—	.870	2nd	31	24	7	0	.774	Won Quarterfinal, (Salem State); Lost Semifinal, 4–7 (Bowdoin)	
1989–90	ECAC East	22	15	6	1	—	—	—	.705	4th	30	18	9	3	.650	Won Quarterfinal, 6–5 (Norwich); Won Semifinal, 5–2 (Babson); Won Championship, 8–6 (Middlebury)	
1990–91	ECAC East	23	12	9	2	—	—	—	.565	—	29	16	11	2	.586	Lost Quarterfinal, 2–3 (Babson)	
1991–92	ECAC East	22	9	11	2	—	—	—	.455	—	26	11	13	2	.462		
1992–93	ECAC East	23	13	7	3	—	—	—	.630	—	27	16	8	3	.648	Lost Quarterfinal, (Williams)	
1993–94	ECAC East	17	10	7	0	—	—	—	20	T–8th	26	14	12	0	.538	Lost Quarterfinal, 0–10 (Bowdoin)	
1994–95	ECAC East	17	2	13	2	—	—	—	6	T–16th	25	4	19	2	.200		
1995–96	ECAC East	19	6	12	1	—	—	—	13	—	24	7	15	2	.333		
1996–97	ECAC East	19	4	13	2	—	—	—	10	T–17th	25	5	18	2	.240		
1997–98	ECAC East	19	3	15	1	—	—	—	7	19th	24	5	18	1	.229		
Division I
1998–99	MAAC	28	11	13	4	—	—	—	26	5th	32	12	16	4	.438	Lost Quarterfinal, 4–7 (Canisius)	
1999–00	MAAC	27	5	19	3	—	—	—	13	9th	30	7	20	3	.283		
2000–01	MAAC	26	10	15	1	—	—	—	21	9th	31	10	20	1	.339		
2001–02	MAAC	26	6	20	0	—	—	—	12	9th	28	7	21	0	.250		
2002–03	MAAC	26	9	16	1	—	—	—	19	9th	32	10	20	2	.344		
2003–04	Atlantic Hockey	24	3	17	4	—	—	—	10	9th	34	5	25	4	.206	Won Play-In, 4–3 (Army); Lost Quarterfinal, 0–5 (Holy Cross)	
2004–05	Atlantic Hockey	24	4	16	4	—	—	—	12	9th	31	4	23	4	.194	Lost Play-In, 3–5 (Army)	
2005–06	Atlantic Hockey	28	6	17	5	—	—	—	17	8th	32	6	21	5	.266	Lost Quarterfinal, 1–3 (Holy Cross)	
2006–07	Atlantic Hockey	28	7	20	1	—	—	—	15	10th	34	8	25	1	.250	Won Play-In, 4–3 (Canisius); Lost Quarterfinal, 0–4 (Sacred Heart)	
2007–08	Atlantic Hockey	28	8	17	3	—	—	—	19	10th	36	8	23	5	.292	Lost Quarterfinal series, 0–2 (Army)	
2008–09	Atlantic Hockey	28	5	22	1	—	—	—	11	10th	35	5	28	2	.171	Lost First round, 0–1 (OT) (Holy Cross)	
2009–10	Atlantic Hockey	28	5	19	4	—	—	—	14	10th	33	5	24	4	.212	Lost First round, 2–4 (Holy Cross)	
2010–11	Atlantic Hockey	27	7	19	1	—	—	—	15	12th	33	8	24	1	.258	Lost First round, 3–6 (Army)	
2011–12	Atlantic Hockey	27	6	18	3	—	—	—	15	10th	37	8	26	3	.257	Lost First round series, 1–2 (Robert Morris)	
2012–13	Atlantic Hockey	27	9	12	6	—	—	—	24	9th	35	12	17	6	.429	Lost First round series, 0–2 (RIT)	
2013–14	Atlantic Hockey	27	9	17	1	—	—	—	19	11th	36	10	25	1	.292	Lost First round series, 0–2 (Niagara)	
2014–15	Atlantic Hockey	28	4	17	7	—	—	—	15	10th	36	4	25	7	.208	Lost First round series, 0–2 (Air Force)	
2015–16	Atlantic Hockey	28	6	19	3	—	—	—	15	T–10th	39	7	29	3	.218	Lost First round series, 1–2 (Army)	
Eric Lang (2016 — Present)
2016–17	Atlantic Hockey	28	7	14	7	—	—	—	21	10th	36	8	20	8	.333	Lost First round series, 0–2 (Mercyhurst)	
2017–18	Atlantic Hockey	28	11	13	4	—	—	—	26	8th	39	15	20	4	.436	Won First round series, 2–0 (Niagara); Lost Quarterfinal series, 1–2 (Canisius)	
2018–19	Atlantic Hockey	28	18	9	1	—	—	—	37	1st	41	23	17	1	.573	Won Quarterfinal series, 2–1 (Army); Won Semifinal, 3–2 (Robert Morris); Won Championship, 3–2 (OT) (Niagara)	Won Regional semifinal, 2–1 (St. Cloud State); Lost Regional final, 0–3 (Denver)
2019–20	Atlantic Hockey	28	21	6	1	—	—	0	64	1st	34	21	12	1	.632	Tournament cancelled	
2020–21	Atlantic Hockey	12	11	1	0	1	0	0	.889	1st	19	15	4	0	.789	No contest Quarterfinal series, (Bentley); Won Semifinal, 2–1 (Niagara); Won Championship, 5–2 (Canisius)	Lost Regional semifinal, 1–5 (North Dakota)
2021–22	Atlantic Hockey	26	17	7	2	1	2	0	53	1st	37	22	12	3	.635	Won Quarterfinal series, 2–0 (Bentley); Won Semifinal, 5–4 (Mercyhurst); Won Championship, 7–0 (Air Force)	Lost Regional semifinal, 3–5 (Michigan)
2022–23	Atlantic Hockey	26	14	8	4	2	0	3	47	2nd	39	18	14	7	.551	Lost Quarterfinal series, 1–2 (Holy Cross)	
2023–24	Atlantic Hockey	26	12	10	4	1	1	2	42	5th	40	20	16	4	.550	Won Quarterfinal series, 2–0 (Air Force); Won Semifinal, 2–1 (Holy Cross); Lost Championship, 2–5 (RIT)	
2024–25	AHA	26	9	16	1	0	3	0	31	8th	38	13	23	2	.368	Won First Round, 2–1 (OT) (RIT); Lost Quarterfinal Semifinal, 1–2 (Holy Cross)	
Totals											GP	W	L	T	%	Championships	
Regular season											1961	766	1080	115	.420	4 Atlantic Hockey Championships	
Conference Post-season											71	30	41	0	.423	1 ECAC 2 tournament championship, 1 ECAC East tournament championship, 3 Atlantic Hockey tournament championships	
NCAA Post-season											4	1	3	0	.250	3 NCAA Tournament Appearances	
Regular season and Post-season Record											2036	797	1124	115	.420		

* Winning percentage is used when conference schedules are unbalanced.
