= List of Robert Morris Colonials men's ice hockey seasons =

This is a season-by-season list of records compiled by Robert Morris in men's ice hockey.

Robert Morris University has made one appearance in the NCAA Tournament.

== Season-by-season results ==
Note: GP = Games played, W = Wins, L = Losses, T = Ties

NCAA D-I Champions	NCAA Frozen Four	Conference regular season champions	Conference Playoff Champions

Season	Conference	Regular Season (Note: Code explanation; GP—Games Played, W—Wins, L—Losses, T—Tied games, OTW—Overtime Wins, OTL—Overtime Loses, 3/SW—Win in 3 on 3 overtime or shootout, Pts—Points*)														Conference Tournament Results	National Tournament Results
Season	Conference	Conference									Overall					Conference Tournament Results	National Tournament Results
Season	Conference	GP	W	L	T	OTW	OTL	3/SW	Pts*	Finish	GP	W	L	T	%	Conference Tournament Results	National Tournament Results
Derek Schooley (2004–Present)
2004–05	CHA	20	4	14	2	–	–	–	10	6th	33	8	21	4	.303	Lost Quarterfinal, 1–5 (Niagara)	
2005–06	CHA	20	7	11	2	–	–	–	16	T–4th	35	12	20	3	.386	Won Quarterfinal, 4–3 (Air Force); Lost Semifinal, 2–3 (Niagara)	
2006–07	CHA	20	9	10	1	–	–	–	19	3rd	35	14	19	2	.429	Won Semifinal, 7–5 (Bemidji State); Lost Championship, 4–5 (OT) (Alabama–Huntsville)	
2007–08	CHA	20	10	7	3	–	–	–	23	3rd	34	15	15	4	.500	Lost Semifinal, 3–6 (Niagara)	
2008–09	CHA	18	5	8	5	–	–	–	15	3rd	36	10	19	7	.375	Won Semifinal, 2–1 (Niagara); Lost Championship, 2–3 (OT) (Bemidji State)	
2009–10	CHA	18	6	9	3	–	–	–	15	2nd	35	10	19	6	.371	Lost Semifinal, 0–1 (Alabama–Huntsville); Tied Third-place game, 3–3 (Bemidji State)	
2010–11	Atlantic Hockey	27	13	9	5	–	–	–	31	5th	35	18	12	5	.586	Lost First round, 1–5 (Mercyhurst)	
2011–12	Atlantic Hockey	27	13	9	5	–	–	–	31	7th	39	17	17	5	.500	Won First round series, 2–1 (American International); Lost Quarterfinal series, 0–2 (Niagara)	
2012–13	Atlantic Hockey	27	13	11	3	–	–	–	29	5th	38	20	14	4	.579	Won First round series, 2–0 (Sacred Heart); Lost Quarterfinal series, 0–2 (Connecticut)	
2013–14	Atlantic Hockey	27	13	9	5	–	–	–	31	5th	42	19	18	5	.512	Won First round series, 2–1 (Army); Won Quarterfinal series, 2–0 (Connecticut); Won Semifinal, 5–4 (OT) (Niagara); Won Championship, 7–4 (Canisius)	Lost Regional semifinal, 3–7 (Minnesota)
2014–15	Atlantic Hockey	28	19	5	4	–	–	–	42	1st	37	24	8	5	.716	Won Quarterfinal series, 2–0 (Niagara); Lost Semifinal, 3–4 (OT) (Mercyhurst)	
2015–16	Atlantic Hockey	28	18	6	4	–	–	–	40	1st	39	24	11	4	.667	Won Quarterfinal series, 2–0 (Bentley); Won Semifinal, 2–1 (OT) (Army); Lost Championship, 4–7 (RIT)	
2016–17	Atlantic Hockey	28	15	10	3	–	–	–	33	T–3rd	38	22	12	4	.632	Won Quarterfinal series, 2–0 (Holy Cross); Won Semifinal, 6–2 (Canisius); Lost Championship, 1–2 (Air Force)	
2017–18	Atlantic Hockey	28	12	13	3	–	–	–	27	T–6th	41	18	20	3	.476	Won First round series, 2–1 (Bentley); Won Quarterfinal series, 2–0 (Holy Cross); Won Semifinal, 5–4 (OT) (Mercyhurst); Lost Championship, 1–5 (Air Force)	
2018–19	Atlantic Hockey	28	11	15	2	–	–	–	24	T–8th	40	16	22	2	.425	Won First round series, 2–1 (Holy Cross); Won Quarterfinal series, 2–1 (Bentley); Lost Semifinal, 2–3 (OT) (American International)	
2019–20	Atlantic Hockey	28	11	12	5	–	–	3	41	T–6th	37	13	19	5	.419	Won First round series, 2–1 (Holy Cross); Tournament Cancelled	
2020–21	Atlantic Hockey	15	10	5	0	2	1	0	.644	3rd	24	15	9	0	.625	Lost Quarterfinal series, 1–2 (Niagara)	
Program suspended
2023–24	Atlantic Hockey	26	7	17	2	0	1	1	25	11th	39	11	25	3	.321	Won First Round, 4–3 (OT) (Bentley); Lost Quarterfinal series, 0–2 (RIT)	
2024–25	AHA	26	7	15	4	1	2	1	27	10th	35	10	20	5	.357	Lost First Round, 3–4 (2OT) (Air Force)	
2025–26	AHA	26	13	11	2	0	2	2	45	T–3rd	40	16	21	3	.438	Won Quarterfinal series, 2–1 (Air Force); Lost Semifinal series, 1–2 (Sacred Heart)	
Totals											GP	W	L	T	%	Championships	
Regular Season											662	275	309	78	.474	2 Atlantic Hockey Championships	
Conference Post-season											69	37	31	1	.543	1 Atlantic Hockey tournament championship	
NCAA Post-season											1	0	1	0	.000	1 NCAA Tournament appearance	
Regular Season and Post-season Record											732	312	341	79	.480		

* Winning percentage is used when conference schedules are unbalanced.
