= 2019–20 American International Yellow Jackets men's ice hockey season =

Atlantic Hockey, Champion
- Conference: 1st Atlantic Hockey
- Home ice: MassMutual Center

Rankings
- USCHO: 20
- USA Today: NR

Record
- Overall: 21–12–1
- Conference: 21–6–1–0
- Home: 11–4–1
- Road: 10–8–0
- Neutral: 0–0–0

Coaches and captains
- Head coach: Eric Lang
- Assistant coaches: Steve Wiedler; Cory Schneider; Patrick Tabb
- Captain(s): Hugo Reinhardt; Joel Kocur

The 2019–20 American International Yellow Jackets men's ice hockey season was the 72nd season of play for the program, the 24th at the Division I level, and the 17th season in the Atlantic Hockey conference. The Yellow Jackets represented American International College and were coached by Eric Lang, in his 4th season.

On March 12, 2020, Atlantic Hockey announced that the remainder of the conference tournament was cancelled due to the coronavirus pandemic.

== Departures ==
Player	Position	Nationality	Cause
Samuel Best	Goaltender	United States	Transferred to Massachusetts–Boston
Darius Davidson	Forward	Canada	Signed professional contract (Macon Mayhem)
Shawn McBride	Forward/Defenseman	Canada	Graduation (signed with Hartford Wolf Pack)
Vitaliy Novytskyy	Defenseman	Ukraine	Transferred to Liberty
Ryan Papa	Forward	United States	Graduation (retired)
Evan Plotnik	Goaltender	United States	Left program (retired)

== Recruiting ==
Player	Position	Nationality	Age	Notes
Austin Albrecht	Forward	United States	23	Flemington, NJ; transfer from Massachusetts
Blake Bennett	Forward	United States	21	Grand Island, NY
Calvon Boots	Defenseman	United States	21	Salmon, ID
Brett Callahan	Defenseman	United States	20	Westmont, IL
Jarrett Fiske	Goaltender	United States	20	Erie, PA
Nate Hooper	Forward	Canada	21	Winnipeg, MB
Hunter Johannes	Forward	United States	21	Eden Prairie, MN
Austen Long	Forward	United States	21	Minneapolis, MN
Jake Stella	Forward	Sweden	20	Karlstad, SWE
Justin Wilson	Forward	Canada	21	North Vancouver, BC

== Roster ==
As of September 12, 2019.

No.	Nat.	Player	Class	Pos	Height	Weight	DoB	Hometown	Previous team	NHL rights
1	(United States)	Jarrett Fiske	Freshman	G	6' 5" (1.96 m)	190 lb (86 kg)	1999-05-28	Erie, Pennsylvania	Kemptville 73's (CCHL)	—
2	(United States)	Nicolas Luka	Senior	D	5' 11" (1.8 m)	175 lb (79 kg)	1995-08-18	Bartlett, Illinois	Coulee Region Chill (NAHL)	—
3	(Czech Republic)	Patrik Demel	Senior	D	5' 11" (1.8 m)	185 lb (84 kg)	1995-11-28	Ostrava, Czech Republic	Bismarck Bobcats (NAHL)	—
4	(United States)	Brett Callahan	Freshman	D	5' 10" (1.78 m)	175 lb (79 kg)	1998-10-16	Westmont, Illinois	New Jersey Hitmen (NCDC)	—
5	(United States)	Calvon Boots	Freshman	D	5' 11" (1.8 m)	185 lb (84 kg)	1998-02-11	Fairbanks, Alaska	Flin Flon Bombers (SJHL)	—
6	(United States)	Jeff Baum	Junior	D	5' 11" (1.8 m)	185 lb (84 kg)	1996-06-17	Colleyville, Texas	Providence Friars (HEA)	—
7	(Sweden)	Oskar Strömberg	Junior	D	6' 7" (2.01 m)	230 lb (104 kg)	1996-11-26	Sollentuna, Sweden	New Jersey Titans (NAHL)	—
8	(United States)	Brennan Kapcheck	Junior	D	5' 9" (1.75 m)	170 lb (77 kg)	1996-11-17	Mount Prospect, Illinois	Aston Rebels (NAHL)	—
9	(United States)	Blake Bennett	Freshman	F	5' 9" (1.75 m)	185 lb (84 kg)	1998-07-01	Grand Island, New York	Corpus Christi IceRays (NAHL)	—
10	(Sweden)	Martin Mellberg	Senior	F	6' 1" (1.85 m)	183 lb (83 kg)	1995-09-17	Stockholm, Sweden	Lone Star Brahmas (NAHL)	—
11	(Czech Republic)	Jan Štefka	Sophomore	F	6' 3" (1.91 m)	194 lb (88 kg)	1997-02-18	Olomouc, Czech Republic	Connecticut Jr. Rangers (NCDC)	—
12	(United States)	Eric Otto	Freshman (RS)	F	6' 1" (1.85 m)	175 lb (79 kg)	1997-07-19	Burnsville, Minnesota	Chicago Steel (USHL)	—
13	(Sweden)	Hugo Reinhardt (C)	Senior	F	5' 11" (1.8 m)	200 lb (91 kg)	1996-04-06	Kungsbacka, Sweden	Fargo Force (USHL)	—
14	(United States)	Jared Pike	Senior	F	6' 4" (1.93 m)	215 lb (98 kg)	1995-12-31	Sandy, Utah	Bismarck Bobcats (NAHL)	—
15	(Slovakia)	Matus Spodniak	Sophomore	F	5' 11" (1.8 m)	200 lb (91 kg)	1997-12-22	Košice, Slovakia	Ogden Mustangs (WSHL)	—
16	(Canada)	Kyle Stephan	Senior	F	6' 2" (1.88 m)	190 lb (86 kg)	1995-02-20	Banff, Alberta	Wenatchee Wild (BCHL)	—
18	(United States)	Blake Christensen	Senior	F	5' 9" (1.75 m)	180 lb (82 kg)	1995-09-15	Coral Springs, Florida	Wenatchee Wild (BCHL)	—
20	(Norway)	Tobias Fladeby	Junior	F	6' 0" (1.83 m)	191 lb (87 kg)	1996-05-20	Asker, Norway	Bismarck Bobcats (NAHL)	—
21	(United States)	Justin Cole	Sophomore (RS)	F	6' 3" (1.91 m)	205 lb (93 kg)	1996-05-01	Bryn Athyn, Pennsylvania	Cedar Rapids RoughRiders (USHL)	—
22	(United States)	Parker Revering	Sophomore	D	6' 1" (1.85 m)	200 lb (91 kg)	1997-01-11	Alexandria, Minnesota	Brookings Blizzard (NAHL)	—
23	(United States)	Austin Albrecht	Junior	F	6' 0" (1.83 m)	193 lb (88 kg)	1996-05-14	Flemington, New Jersey	Massachusetts Minutemen (HEA)	—
24	(Canada)	Joel Kocur (C)	Senior	F	6' 1" (1.85 m)	188 lb (85 kg)	1995-09-18	Edson, Alberta	Flin Flon (SJHL)	—
25	(Slovenia)	Luka Maver	Sophomore (RS)	F	6' 3" (1.91 m)	195 lb (88 kg)	1997-10-25	Ljubljana, Slovenia	Lincoln Stars (USHL)	—
26	(Canada)	Chris Theodore	Sophomore	F	5' 7" (1.7 m)	180 lb (82 kg)	1997-10-15	Beaconsfield, Quebec	Cornwall Colts (CCHL)	—
27	(Latvia)	Jānis Jaks	Senior	D	6' 0" (1.83 m)	190 lb (86 kg)	1995-08-22	Iecava, Latvia	Minnesota Wilderness (NAHL)	—
28	(United States)	Elijiah Barriga	Sophomore	F	5' 11" (1.8 m)	193 lb (88 kg)	1996-05-16	West Covina, California	UNLV Rebels (ACHA)	—
29	(Canada)	Nate Hooper	Freshman	F	6' 2" (1.88 m)	185 lb (84 kg)	1998-01-08	Winnipeg, Manitoba	Flin Flon Bombers (BCHL)	—
30	(Canada)	Stefano Durante	Junior	G	6' 0" (1.83 m)	170 lb (77 kg)	1996-06-04	Brampton, Ontario	Cobourg Cougars (OJHL)	—
33	(Sweden)	Zackarias Skog	Senior	G	6' 4" (1.93 m)	200 lb (91 kg)	1995-06-27	Gothenburg, Sweden	Omaha Lancers (USHL)	—
37	(United States)	Hunter Johannes	Freshman	F	6' 2" (1.88 m)	200 lb (91 kg)	1998-07-24	Eden Prairie, Minnesota	Jamestown Rebels (NAHL)	—
39	(Sweden)	Jake Stella	Freshman	F	6' 0" (1.83 m)	190 lb (86 kg)	1998-11-14	Karlstad, Sweden	Corpus Christi IceRays (NAHL)	—
55	(United States)	Chris Dodero	Junior	F	5' 9" (1.75 m)	176 lb (80 kg)	1996-06-08	West Chicago, Illinois	Janesville Jets (NAHL)	—
61	(Canada)	Justin Wilson	Freshman	F	6' 4" (1.93 m)	200 lb (91 kg)	1998-06-30	North Vancouver, British Columbia	Salmon Arm Silverbacks (BCHL)	—

== Standings ==
2019–20 Atlantic Hockey Standings
	Conference record								Overall record					
	GP	W	L	T	3/SW	PTS	GF	GA	GP	W	L	T	GF	GA
#20 American International	28	21	6	1	0	64	96	46	34	21	12	1	103	68
Sacred Heart	28	18	8	2	0	56	104	63	34	21	10	3	127	82
RIT	28	15	9	4	1	50	86	73	36	19	13	4	108	98
Army	28	14	11	3	3	48	70	64	33	17	13	3	82	76
Niagara	28	12	12	4	2	42	64	65	34	12	18	4	72	87
Air Force	28	10	12	6	5	41	60	67	34	10	18	6	70	95
Robert Morris	28	11	12	5	3	41	65	65	34	11	18	5	75	90
Bentley	28	13	13	2	0	41	75	80	34	15	16	3	83	94
Canisius	28	9	13	6	3	36	71	83	34	10	18	6	80	109
Holy Cross	28	9	16	3	2	32	67	83	34	10	19	5	80	99
Mercyhurst	28	3	23	2	0	11	49	118	34	5	27	2	64	141
Championship: March 20, 2020 † indicates conference regular season champion; * indicates conference tournament champion Rankings: USCHO.com Top 20 Poll; updated March 1, 2020

== Schedule and results ==
Date	Time	Opponent^{#}	Rank^{#}	Site	TV	Decision	Result	Attendance	Record
Regular season
October 11	7:17 PM	at #9 Quinnipiac*		People's United Center • Hamden, Connecticut		Skog	L 2–3	2,823	0–1–0
October 12	7:00 PM	vs. #9 Quinnipiac*		MassMutual Center • Springfield, Massachusetts		Skog	L 2–3	1,376	0–2–0
October 18	7:05 PM	at Sacred Heart		Webster Bank Arena • Bridgeport, Connecticut		Skog	W 2–1	469	1–2–0 (1–0–0–0)
October 25	7:00 PM	at #3 Massachusetts*		Mullins Center • Amherst, Massachusetts		Skog	L 1–4	4,873	1–3–0 (1–0–0–0)
November 1	7:05 PM	at Army		Tate Rink • West Point, New York		Skog	L 1–2	1,343	1–4–0 (1–1–0–0)
November 2	1:05 PM	vs. Army		MassMutual Center • Springfield, Massachusetts		Skog	W 4–1	1,484	2–4–0 (2–1–0–0)
November 15	7:05 PM	at Mercyhurst		Mercyhurst Ice Center • Erie, Pennsylvania		Skog	W 12–0	748	3–4–0 (3–1–0–0)
November 16	4:05 PM	at Mercyhurst		Mercyhurst Ice Center • Erie, Pennsylvania		Durante	L 3–4 ^{OT}	687	3–5–0 (3–2–0–0)
November 26	7:05 PM	vs. Army		MassMutual Center • Springfield, Massachusetts		Skog	L 1–4	567	3–6–0 (3–3–0–0)
November 29	7:05 PM	vs. RIT		MassMutual Center • Springfield, Massachusetts		Skog	W 4–2	692	4–6–0 (4–3–0–0)
November 30	1:05 PM	vs. RIT		MassMutual Center • Springfield, Massachusetts		Skog	W 5–1	517	5–6–0 (5–3–0–0)
December 3	7:05 PM	vs. Sacred Heart		MassMutual Center • Springfield, Massachusetts		Skog	L 4–2	414	5–7–0 (5–4–0–0)
December 6	1:05 PM	vs. Canisius		MassMutual Center • Springfield, Massachusetts		Skog	W 6–0	244	6–7–0 (6–4–0–0)
December 7	1:10 PM	vs. Canisius		MassMutual Center • Springfield, Massachusetts		Skog	W 3–2 ^{OT}	376	7–7–0 (7–4–0–0)
December 10	7:00 PM	at Princeton*		Hobey Baker Memorial Rink • Princeton, New Jersey		Durante	L 1–2	888	7–8–0 (7–4–0–0)
December 13	1:05 PM	vs. Niagara		MassMutual Center • Springfield, Massachusetts		Skog	W 3–1	219	8–8–0 (8–4–0–0)
December 14	1:05 PM	vs. Niagara		MassMutual Center • Springfield, Massachusetts		Skog	T 0–0 ^{SOL}	467	8–8–1 (8–4–1–0)
December 29	4:00 PM	at Maine*		Alfond Arena • Orono, Maine	WPME	Skog	L 1–5	3,063	8–9–1 (8–4–1–0)
January 3	9:05 PM	at Air Force		Cadet Ice Arena • Colorado Springs, Colorado		Skog	L 1–4	1,779	8–10–1 (8–5–1–0)
January 4	7:05 PM	at Air Force		Cadet Ice Arena • Colorado Springs, Colorado		Skog	W 5–1	1,704	9–10–1 (9–5–1–0)
January 9	7:05 PM	vs. #12 Providence*		MassMutual Center • Springfield, Massachusetts		Durante	L 0–5	1,102	9–11–1 (9–5–1–0)
January 17	7:05 PM	at Bentley		Bentley Arena • Waltham, Massachusetts		Durante	W 4–1	1,425	10–11–1 (10–5–1–0)
January 18	4:05 PM	at Bentley		Bentley Arena • Waltham, Massachusetts		Durante	W 2–1	1,332	11–11–1 (11–5–1–0)
January 24	7:05 PM	at Robert Morris		Colonials Arena • Neville Township, Pennsylvania		Durante	W 4–3	777	12–11–1 (12–5–1–0)
January 25	4:05 PM	at Robert Morris		Colonials Arena • Neville Township, Pennsylvania		Durante	W 4–1	686	13–11–1 (13–5–1–0)
January 31	7:05 PM	vs. Mercyhurst		MassMutual Center • Springfield, Massachusetts		Durante	W 4–3	576	14–11–1 (14–5–1–0)
February 1	1:05 PM	vs. Mercyhurst		MassMutual Center • Springfield, Massachusetts		Durante	W 7–4	649	15–11–1 (15–5–1–0)
February 11	7:05 PM	vs. #20 Sacred Heart		MassMutual Center • Springfield, Massachusetts		Durante	W 6–2	727	16–11–1 (16–5–1–0)
February 14	7:35 PM	at Canisius		LECOM Harborcenter • Buffalo, New York		Durante	W 4–1	417	17–11–1 (17–5–1–0)
February 15	4:05 PM	at Canisius		LECOM Harborcenter • Buffalo, New York		Durante	W 3–2	717	18–11–1 (18–5–1–0)
February 20	7:05 PM	vs. Holy Cross		MassMutual Center • Springfield, Massachusetts		Durante	W 4–1	776	19–11–1 (19–5–1–0)
February 22	7:05 PM	vs. Holy Cross		MassMutual Center • Springfield, Massachusetts		Skog	W 2–0	1,108	20–11–1 (20–5–1–0)
February 26	7:05 PM	at Sacred Heart	#20	Webster Bank Arena • Bridgeport, Connecticut		Durante	L 3–5	304	20–12–1 (20–6–1–0)
February 29	7:05 PM	at Army	#20	Tate Rink • West Point, New York		Skog	W 4–1	2,242	21–12–1 (21–6–1–0)
Atlantic Hockey Tournament
Tournament Cancelled
*Non-conference game. ^{#}Rankings from USCHO.com Poll. All times are in Eastern Time.

== Scoring Statistics ==
Name	Position	Games	Goals	Assists	Points	PIM
Blake Christensen	LW	34	11	17	28	12
Martin Mellberg	RW	34	9	19	28	19
Brennan Kapcheck	D	33	2	23	25	61
Tobias Fladeby	LW/RW	32	12	11	23	14
Hugo Reinhardt	D	34	13	9	22	40
Patrik Demel	C/LW	34	2	19	21	10
Joel Kocur	LW	34	9	11	20	39
Elijiah Barriga	LW	28	11	8	19	12
Luka Maver	C	32	6	11	17	8
Jānis Jaks	D	33	6	9	15	6
Austin Albrecht	LW	33	5	10	15	10
Jared Pike	F	33	8	6	14	24
Chris Dodero	C/LW	34	3	6	9	12
Parker Revering	D	32	2	6	8	28
Nicholas Luka	D	30	1	7	8	14
Austen Long	RW	14	2	5	7	2
Jeff Baum	D/F	32	2	5	7	14
Jake Stella	LW	27	1	6	7	8
Justin Cole	F	24	2	4	6	0
Kyle Stephan	RW	28	1	5	6	12
Jan Štefka	F	7	1	0	1	2
Hunter Johannes	F	7	1	0	1	2
Matúš Spodniak	F	1	0	0	0	0
Brett Callahan	D	1	0	0	0	0
Calvon Boots	D	1	0	0	0	0
Nate Hooper	C	1	0	0	0	0
Jarrett Fiske	G	2	0	0	0	0
Chris Theodore	LW	3	0	0	0	0
Oskar Strömberg	D	10	0	0	0	6
Stefano Durante	G	17	0	0	0	0
Zacharias Skog	G	19	0	0	0	0
Bench	-	-	-	-	-	4
Total						

== Goaltending statistics ==
Name	Games	Minutes	Wins	Losses	Ties	Goals against	Saves	Shut outs	SV %	GAA
Jarrett Fiske	2	5	0	0	0	0	0	0	-	0.00
Zackarias Skog	19	1049	10	8	1	32	403	4	.926	1.83
Stefano Durante	17	973	11	4	0	38	424	0	.918	2.34
Empty Net	-	23	-	-	-	4	-	-	-	-
Total	34	2051	21	12	1	74	827	4	.918	2.16

== Rankings ==
Poll	Week																							
Poll	Pre	1	2	3	4	5	6	7	8	9	10	11	12	13	14	15	16	17	18	19	20	21	22	23 (Final)
USCHO.com	NR	NR	NR	NR	NR	NR	NR	NR	NR	NR	NR	NR	NR	NR	NR	NR	NR	NR	NR	NR	20	20	20	20
USA Today	NR	NR	NR	NR	NR	NR	NR	NR	NR	NR	NR	NR	NR	NR	NR	NR	NR	NR	NR	NR	NR	NR	NR	NR

== Awards and honors ==
=== NCAA ===
Honor	Player	Position
Derek Hines Unsung Hero Award	Jared Pike	Forward

=== Atlantic Hockey ===
Honor	Player	Position
Regular Season Goaltending Award	Zackarias Skog	Goaltender
Coach of the Year	Eric Lang	Coach
All-Atlantic Hockey First Team	Zackarias Skog	Goaltender
All-Atlantic Hockey First Team	Brennan Kapcheck	Defenseman
All-Atlantic Hockey First Team	Blake Christensen	Forward
All-Atlantic Hockey Second Team	Patrik Demel	Defenseman
All-Atlantic Hockey Third Team	Martin Mellberg	Forward
All-Atlantic Hockey Third Team	Hugo Reinhardt	Forward
