= 2023–24 American International Yellow Jackets men's ice hockey season =

- Conference: 5th Atlantic Hockey
- Home ice: MassMutual Center

Rankings
- USCHO: NR
- USA Hockey: NR

Record
- Overall: 20–16–4
- Conference: 12–10–4
- Home: 9–4–2
- Road: 11–12–2

Coaches and captains
- Head coach: Eric Lang
- Assistant coaches: Patrick Tabb; Matthew Woodward; Brendan Riley
- Captain(s): Brett Callahan; Brian Kramer
- Alternate captain: Julius Janhonen

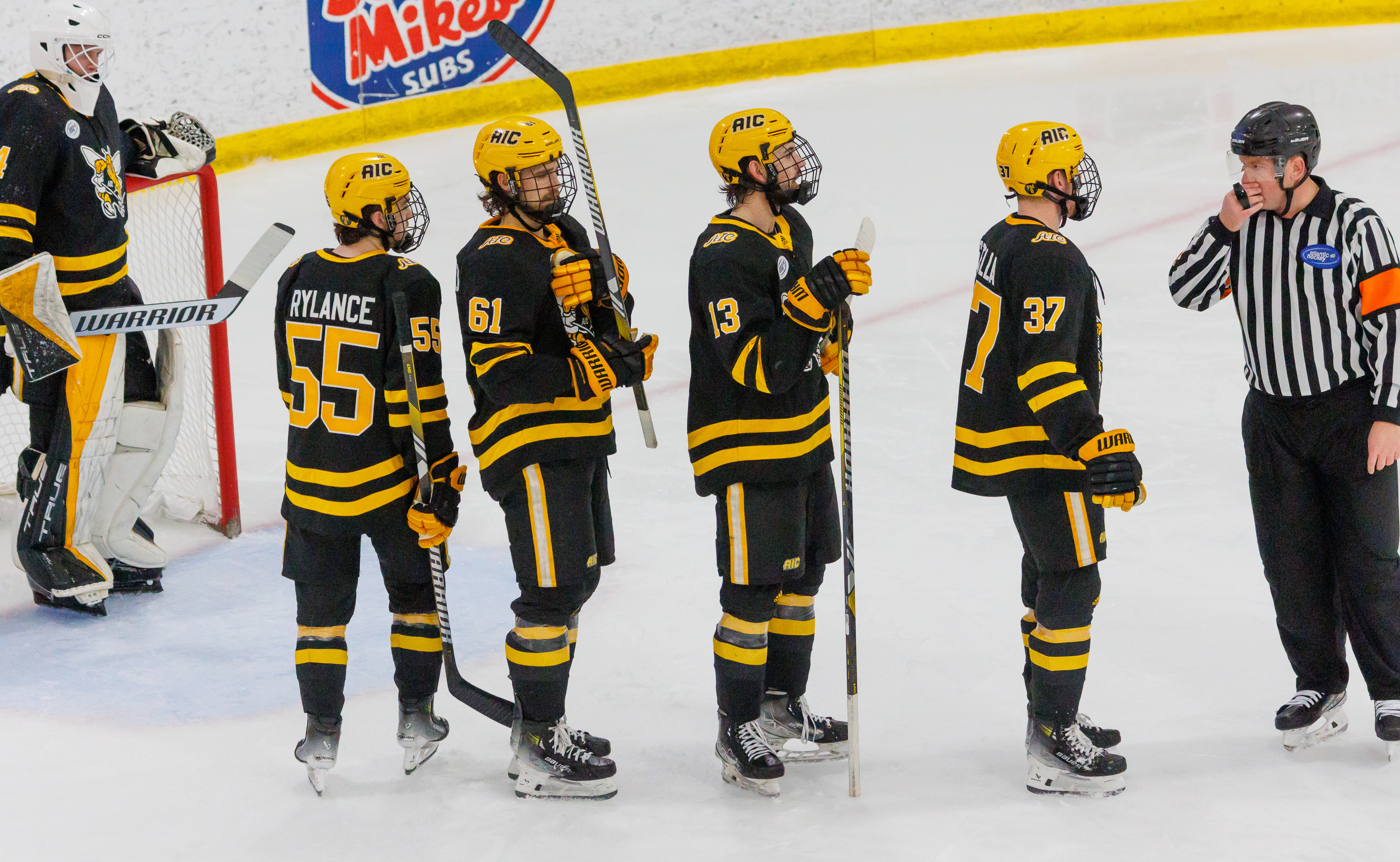
AIC players talk with the referee

The 2023–24 American International Yellow Jackets men's ice hockey season was the 76th season of play for the program, the 26th at the Division I level and 21st in the Atlantic Hockey conference. The Yellow Jackets represented American International College, played their home games at MassMutual Center and were coached by Eric Lang in his eighth season.

== Season ==
While many of the team's key skaters were returning this season, the Yellow Jackets had a quandary in goal. Senior Alexandros Aslanadis had shown flashes of good goaltending over the previous two seasons but had yet to serve as the primary netminder. Conversely, freshman Nils Wallström entered the program with a solid résumé in the Swedish junior leagues and NAHL but he had yet to face the collegiate level of competition. Coach Lang decided to throw Wallström into the deep end at the beginning of the season, with the first-year netminder facing down Massachusetts and defending national champions, Quinnipiac. Wallström survived for two games before his inexperience got the better of him and he was pulled in the second match with the Bobcats. Wallström was able to retain the net as his play stabilized and he soon established himself as AIC's best option in goal.

The forward unit was a slightly more cohesive group at the start but it was the defense that allowed American International to overcome its early rough patch. From the start of November, the defenders, led by Brian Kramer, gave their young netminder the time needed to grow accustomed to the college game and held off the opposing attack. Over a 14-game span the team allowed more than 30 shots on goal just once and routinely kept their foes at or near the 20-shot mark. The stellar play on defense helped the team put together a six-game winning streak and put them within a game of 1st-place in the conference by Christmas.

After returning form the break, AIC stumbled through the first few weeks of January and the team began to slide down the standings. After a week off, their inconsistent offense could only manage a split with Robert Morris but then the injury bug began to bite the team. John Lundy was injured in the first match with the Colonials while Alfred Lindberg and Alexander Malinowski were both lost a week later. One week on, Brian Kramer was felled and the team suddenly found itself without four of its top seven scorers. While the various ailments were feared to be season-ending, Lundy and Kramer managed to get back into the lineup by the start of the postseason.

In the wake of the injuries, the team had to rely more heavily on Wallström and Aslanidis. The two played their best games of the season and helped AIC get points in each of the final five games; however, it was not quite enough to keep the team in the top four and ensure a home stand in the conference quarterfinals. AIC did manage to hold onto a bye so they would not risk getting knocked out in the first round and it gave their injured players time to heal.

American International opened their postseason with probably the most difficult position as they had to travel to Colorado to take on Air Force. Fortunately for the Yellow Jackets, they had already made a trip and at least knew what to expect with the altitude. The team was largely outplayed in the first game but Wallström continued his inspired play and allowed just a single goal. Air Force broke through at the beginning of the second game and built a 2-goal lead in the first period. AIC stormed back with 20 shots in the second; however, none of them managed to find the back of the net. It was not until the start of the third when they finally broke through but their harrying attack subsided a bit as the Falcons pulled back into a defensive shell. As time wound down, Wallström was pulled for an extra attacker and Lundy managed to tie the game with his 14th of the season. Sensing that AIC had used up too much energy to tie the game, Air Force went on the attack in overtime and put up 15 shots in 12 minutes. After a turnover at their own blueline, AIC got on an odd-man rush and Nico Somerville ended the game on a laser that bounced in off of the crossbar.

The mild upset set up a meeting with Holy Cross in the semifinals. AIC opened the scoring on the power play but were unable to follow through on their next three opportunities. Instead, the Crusaders scored three times in the second half of the first to take a commanding lead. A second goal from the Yellow Jackets cut the lead to one but they were unable to get the tying marker. A pair of empty-net goals at the end of the match put the game out of reach but did not change the fact that the two were evenly matched throughout. in the second game, with their season on the line, Wallström became the hero, stopping all 32 shots, including 17 in the third, to earn his second shutout of the season. He was nearly able to pull of the same feat in the deciding third game, stopping 44 of 45 attempts and put AIC one win away from the NCAA tournament. Similar t the opening game with Holy Cross, the match with RIT was close for the first two periods. The two exchanged leads in the opening 20 minutes but a power play marker from the Tigers at the start of second went unanswered. As time progressed the Yellow Jackets remained down by a goal and were forced to pull Wallström. Unfortunately, the ploy failed and two empty-net goals followed in quick succession to end AIC's season.

== Departures ==
Player	Position	Nationality	Cause
Blake Bennett	Forward	United States	Graduation (signed with Rapid City Rush)
Brennan Boynton	Goaltender	United States	Left program (retired)
Nick Cardelli	Forward	United States	Graduation (signed with Iowa Heartlanders)
Jarrett Fiske	Goaltender	United States	Graduate transfer to Niagara
Aaron Grounds	Defenseman	United States	Transferred to Long Island
Troy Kobryn	Goaltender	United States	Graduation (signed with Norfolk Admirals)
Luis Lindner	Defenseman/Forward	Austria	Transferred to New Hampshire
Reggie Millette	Forward	United States	Signed professional contract (Tulsa Oilers)
Eric Otto	Forward	United States	Graduation (retired)
Zachary Purcell	Forward	United States	Left program (retired)
Jake Rosenbaum	Defenseman	United States	Graduation (retired)
Alexander Tertyshny	Defenseman	United States	Transferred to Stonehill

== Recruiting ==
Player	Position	Nationality	Age	Notes
Douglas Andersson	Forward	Sweden	21	Ängelholm, SWE
Theo Angesved	Defenseman	Sweden	20	Växjö, SWE
Dario Beljo	Forward	Canada	21	Sudbury, ON
Peyton Grainer	Goaltender	United States	21	Detroit, MI
Cole Hudson	Goaltender	United States	23	Tonawanda, NY; transfer from Vermont
Logan Jenuwine	Forward	United States	25	Romeo, MI; graduate transfer from Lake Superior State
Hunter Jones	Forward	United States	21	Andover, MN
Tomi Leppänen	Defenseman	Finland	20	Heinola, FIN
Alfred Lindberg	Forward	Sweden	21	Hallsberg, SWE
Hunter Longhi	Forward	United States	21	Collinsville, IL
Akseli Pennanen	Forward	Finland	20	Espoo, FIN
Nils Wallström	Goaltender	Sweden	19	Skellefteå, SWE
Blake Wells	Forward	Canada	24	Blackie, AB; graduate transfer from Massachusetts

== Roster ==
As of September 14, 2023

No.	Nat.	Player	Class	Pos	Height	Weight	DoB	Hometown	Previous team	NHL rights
1	(United States)	Alexandros Aslanidis	Senior	G	6' 5" (1.96 m)	205 lb (93 kg)	2001-01-20	Moorestown, New Jersey	Western Michigan (NCHC)	—
2	(Canada)	Nico Somerville	Senior	D	5' 9" (1.75 m)	185 lb (84 kg)	1999-04-08	Nanaimo, British Columbia	Penticton (BCHL)	—
3	(United States)	Logan Jenuwine	Graduate	F	6' 3" (1.91 m)	205 lb (93 kg)	1998-05-15	Romeo, Michigan	Lake Superior State (CCHA)	—
4	(United States)	Brett Callahan (C)	Graduate	D	5' 10" (1.78 m)	180 lb (82 kg)	1998-10-16	Westmont, Illinois	Jersey (NCDC)	—
5	(Finland)	Tomi Leppänen	Freshman	D	6' 1" (1.85 m)	190 lb (86 kg)	2003-04-07	Heinola, Finland	Sioux City (USHL)	—
6	(United States)	Matt Rickard	Senior	D	6' 0" (1.83 m)	180 lb (82 kg)	1999-07-28	Coventry, Rhode Island	Lone Star (NAHL)	—
7	(United States)	Brian Kramer (C)	Senior	D	5' 11" (1.8 m)	185 lb (84 kg)	2000-07-20	Wexford, Pennsylvania	Robert Morris (AHA)	—
8	(United States)	Hunter Jones	Freshman	F	5' 10" (1.78 m)	190 lb (86 kg)	2002-07-13	Andover, Minnesota	Oklahoma (NAHL)	—
9	(United States)	Hunter Longhi	Freshman	F	5' 8" (1.73 m)	174 lb (79 kg)	2002-04-02	Collinsville, Illinois	Minot (NAHL)	—
10	(United States)	Dustin Manz	Graduate	F	5' 10" (1.78 m)	188 lb (85 kg)	1999-09-21	Vanderbilt, Michigan	Lake Superior State (CCHA)	—
11	(Finland)	Julius Janhonen (A)	Senior	F	6' 1" (1.85 m)	185 lb (84 kg)	1999-03-05	Espoo, Finland	HIFK U20 (Nuorten SM-liiga)	—
13	(Canada)	Grayson Dietrich	Sophomore	F	6' 2" (1.88 m)	190 lb (86 kg)	2001-12-18	Calgary, Alberta	Drumheller (AJHL)	—
14	(Sweden)	Douglas Andersson	Freshman	F	6' 6" (1.98 m)	209 lb (95 kg)	2002-04-04	Ängelholm, Sweden	Kallinge-Ronneby IF (Hockeyettan)	—
15	(Sweden)	Casper Söderling	Sophomore	D	6' 0" (1.83 m)	175 lb (79 kg)	2001-06-02	Stockholm, Sweden	Nacka J20 (J20 Regional)	—
16	(Canada)	Andrew Amousse	Sophomore	F	6' 3" (1.91 m)	215 lb (98 kg)	2001-07-16	Laval, Quebec	Victoria (BCHL)	—
17	(Sweden)	Oscar Geschwind	Junior	F	6' 0" (1.83 m)	195 lb (88 kg)	2001-02-24	Hällefors, Sweden	Northern Michigan (CCHA)	—
18	(Finland)	Akseli Pennanen	Freshman	F	6' 3" (1.91 m)	198 lb (90 kg)	2003-01-19	Espoo, Finland	Jukurit U20 (U20 SM-sarja)	—
19	(Canada)	Jordan Biro	Senior	F	5' 8" (1.73 m)	160 lb (73 kg)	2000-08-10	Sherwood Park, Alberta	Colorado College (NCHC)	—
20	(United States)	Hunter McCurdy	Sophomore	D	6' 1" (1.85 m)	220 lb (100 kg)	2001-08-09	Mokena, Illinois	Danbury (NAHL)	—
21	(United States)	John Lundy	Sophomore	F	5' 9" (1.75 m)	163 lb (74 kg)	2001-04-27	Brooklyn, New York	Jamestown (NAHL)	—
22	(Russia)	Timofei Khokhlachev	Sophomore	F	6' 4" (1.93 m)	220 lb (100 kg)	2001-11-06	Moscow, Russia	Shreveport (NAHL)	—
23	(Sweden)	Theo Angesved	Freshman	D	5' 11" (1.8 m)	172 lb (78 kg)	2003-06-23	Växjö, Sweden	Borås HC (Hockeyettan)	—
24	(Canada)	Blake Wells	Graduate	F	6' 2" (1.88 m)	201 lb (91 kg)	1999-08-02	Blackie, Alberta	UMass Lowell (HEA)	—
25	(Sweden)	Alexander Malinowski	Sophomore	F	5' 11" (1.8 m)	185 lb (84 kg)	2001-02-07	Linköping, Sweden	Fairbanks (NAHL)	—
26	(Canada)	Jake Sacratini	Sophomore	F	5' 9" (1.75 m)	172 lb (78 kg)	2001-05-19	Pincourt, Quebec	Notre Dame (SJHL)	—
27	(Canada)	Josh Barnes	Sophomore	F	5' 10" (1.78 m)	175 lb (79 kg)	2002-09-27	Cornwall, Ontario	Des Moines (USHL)	—
28	(Sweden)	Alfred Lindberg	Freshman	F	5' 11" (1.8 m)	185 lb (84 kg)	2002-01-28	Hallsberg, Sweden	New Mexico (NAHL)	—
29	(Canada)	Darwin Lakoduk	Senior	F	5' 10" (1.78 m)	165 lb (75 kg)	2000-01-28	Edmonton, Alberta	Penticton (BCHL)	—
30	(United States)	Cole Hudson	Junior	G	6' 1" (1.85 m)	161 lb (73 kg)	2000-03-13	Tonawanda, New York	Vermont (HEA)	—
33	(United States)	Peyton Grainer	Freshman	G	6' 1" (1.85 m)	179 lb (81 kg)	2002-03-12	Detroit, Michigan	Jersey (NCDC)	—
34	(Sweden)	Nils Wallström	Freshman	G	6' 3" (1.91 m)	185 lb (84 kg)	2003-10-15	Skellefteå, Sweden	Kenai River (NAHL)	—
37	(Sweden)	Evan Stella	Junior	D	5' 11" (1.8 m)	180 lb (82 kg)	2001-05-11	Karlstad, Sweden	Dubuque (USHL)	—
39	(Canada)	Dario Beljo	Freshman	F	6' 3" (1.91 m)	190 lb (86 kg)	2002-08-15	Sudbury, Ontario	Brooks (AJHL)	—
44	(United States)	Austen Long	Graduate	F	5' 11" (1.8 m)	175 lb (79 kg)	1998-02-15	Minneapolis, Minnesota	Omaha (USHL)	—
55	(Canada)	Brett Rylance	Sophomore	F	5' 9" (1.75 m)	167 lb (76 kg)	2001-08-03	Edmonton, Alberta	Chilliwack (BCHL)	—
61	(Canada)	Casey McDonald	Sophomore	F	6' 1" (1.85 m)	187 lb (85 kg)	2001-05-10	Plenty, Saskatchewan	Penticton (BCHL)	—

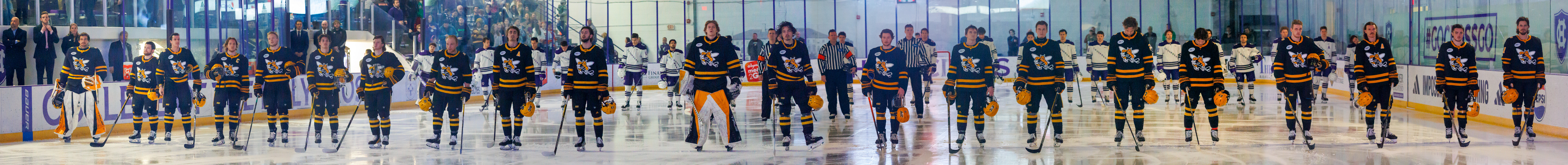
2023-2024 team at Holy Cross's Hart Center

== Standings ==
2023–24 Atlantic Hockey Standings
	Conference record										Overall record					
	GP	W	L	T	OW	OL	SW	PTS	GF	GA	GP	W	L	T	GF	GA
#17 RIT †*	26	18	7	1	3	2	0	54	102	64	40	27	11	2	156	96
Holy Cross	26	13	10	3	0	3	1	46	78	62	39	21	14	4	116	93
Sacred Heart	26	14	10	2	2	2	1	45	75	70	36	14	19	3	91	113
Air Force	26	15	10	1	3	0	1	44	88	75	38	18	19	1	115	119
American International	26	12	10	4	1	1	2	42	79	68	40	20	16	4	119	111
Bentley	26	12	12	2	1	2	2	41	69	58	35	16	17	2	95	82
Niagara	26	13	10	3	3	1	1	41	78	79	39	18	18	3	111	122
Canisius	26	10	12	4	2	1	0	33	73	87	37	12	21	4	103	126
Mercyhurst	26	7	15	4	0	1	4	30	77	91	35	9	22	4	98	126
Army	26	8	16	2	0	1	1	28	66	96	35	10	23	2	93	139
Robert Morris	26	7	17	2	0	1	1	25	60	95	39	11	25	3	94	142
Championship: March 23, 2024 † indicates conference regular season champion (DeGregorio Trophy) * indicates conference tournament champion (Riley Trophy); Rankings: USCHO.com Top 20 Poll

== Schedule and results ==
Date	Time	Opponent^{#}	Rank^{#}	Site	TV	Decision	Result	Attendance	Record
Regular Season
October 7	7:00 pm	at Massachusetts*		Mullins Center • Amherst, Massachusetts	ESPN+	Wallström	L 3–5	4,324	0–1–0
October 13	7:05 pm	#5 Quinnipiac*		MassMutual Center • Springfield, Massachusetts	FloHockey	Wallström	L 2–3 ^{OT}	567	0–2–0
October 14	7:00 pm	at #5 Quinnipiac*		M&T Bank Arena • Hamden, Connecticut	ESPN+	Wallström	L 0–8	3,089	0–3–0
October 20	7:00 pm	at #12 Penn State*		Pegula Ice Arena • University Park, Pennsylvania		Wallström	L 2–3	6,170	0–4–0
October 21	5:07 pm	at #12 Penn State*		Pegula Ice Arena • University Park, Pennsylvania		Aslanidis	W 6–4	6,318	1–4–0
November 2	7:05 pm	Bentley		MassMutual Center • Springfield, Massachusetts	FloHockey	Wallström	W 3–0	201	2–4–0 (1–0–0)
November 3	7:05 pm	at Bentley		Bentley Arena • Waltham, Massachusetts	FloHockey	Wallström	L 1–3	1,423	2–5–0 (1–1–0)
November 9	7:05 pm	Holy Cross		MassMutual Center • Springfield, Massachusetts	FloHockey	Wallström	W 4–1	352	3–5–0 (2–1–0)
November 10	7:05 pm	at Holy Cross		Hart Center • Worcester, Massachusetts	FloHockey	Wallström	W 3–2	631	4–5–0 (3–1–0)
November 18	7:05 pm	Vermont*		MassMutual Center • Springfield, Massachusetts	FloHockey	Wallström	W 2–1	604	5–5–0
November 21	7:05 pm	Bentley		MassMutual Center • Springfield, Massachusetts	FloHockey	Wallström	W 4–2	389	6–5–0 (4–1–0)
November 24	7:30 pm	at Long Island*		Northwell Health Ice Center • East Meadow, New York	ESPN+, SNY	Wallström	W 5–2	550	7–5–0
November 28	7:05 pm	Army		MassMutual Center • Springfield, Massachusetts	FloHockey	Wallström	W 5–1	252	8–5–0 (5–1–0)
December 1	1:05 pm	Sacred Heart		Jennings Fairchild Ice Rink • Avon, Connecticut	FloHockey	Wallström	L 4–5	650	8–6–0 (5–2–0)
December 2	7:05 pm	Sacred Heart		MassMutual Center • Springfield, Massachusetts	FloHockey	Wallström	W 3–2	521	9–6–0 (6–2–0)
December 8	5:05 pm	#19 RIT		MassMutual Center • Springfield, Massachusetts	FloHockey	Wallström	W 3–2 ^{OT}	—	10–6–0 (7–2–0)
December 9	1:05 pm	#19 RIT		MassMutual Center • Springfield, Massachusetts	FloHockey	Wallström	L 2–5	552	10–7–0 (7–3–0)
December 15	7:00 pm	at Canisius		LECOM Harborcenter • Buffalo, New York	FloHockey	Aslanidis	L 2–3	982	10–8–0 (7–4–0)
December 16	5:00 pm	at Canisius		LECOM Harborcenter • Buffalo, New York	FloHockey	Wallström	W 6–1	652	11–8–0 (8–4–0)
December 30	4:00 pm	at Massachusetts Lowell*		Tsongas Center • Lowell, Massachusetts	ESPN+	Wallström	W 4–3	4,468	12–8–0
January 5	1:05 pm	Holy Cross		MassMutual Center • Springfield, Massachusetts	FloHockey	Wallström	T 3–3 ^{SOW}	179	12–8–1 (8–4–1)
January 6	7:05 pm	at Holy Cross		Hart Center • Worcester, Massachusetts	FloHockey	Wallström	L 2–6	589	12–9–1 (8–5–1)
January 12	9:05 pm	at Air Force		Cadet Ice Arena • Colorado Springs, Colorado	FloHockey, Altitude2	Wallström	L 2–6	2,318	12–10–1 (8–6–1)
January 13	7:05 pm	at Air Force		Cadet Ice Arena • Colorado Springs, Colorado	FloHockey	Wallström	W 4–1	2,464	13–10–1 (9–6–1)
January 26	1:05 pm	Robert Morris		MassMutual Center • Springfield, Massachusetts	FloHockey	Wallström	L 0–2	—	13–11–1 (9–7–1)
January 27	1:05 pm	Robert Morris		MassMutual Center • Springfield, Massachusetts	FloHockey	Wallström	W 5–2	256	14–11–1 (10–7–1)
February 2	7:05 pm	at Sacred Heart		Martire Family Arena • Fairfield, Connecticut	FloHockey	Wallström	L 3–4 ^{OT}	3,947	14–12–1 (10–8–1)
February 3	7:05 pm	at Sacred Heart		Martire Family Arena • Fairfield, Connecticut	FloHockey	Aslanidis	L 1–3	3,974	14–13–1 (10–9–1)
February 9	7:05 pm	at Niagara		Dwyer Arena • Lewiston, New York	FloHockey	Aslanidis	L 2–4	651	14–14–1 (10–10–1)
February 10	5:05 pm	at Niagara		Dwyer Arena • Lewiston, New York	FloHockey	Aslanidis	T 4–4 ^{SOW}	749	14–14–2 (10–10–2)
February 16	4:35 pm	Mercyhurst		MassMutual Center • Springfield, Massachusetts	FloHockey	Wallström	W 4–1	228	15–14–2 (11–10–2)
February 17	7:05 pm	Mercyhurst		MassMutual Center • Springfield, Massachusetts	FloHockey	Aslanidis	T 2–2 ^{SOL}	—	15–14–3 (11–10–3)
February 23	7:05 pm	at Army		Tate Rink • West Point, New York	FloHockey	Wallström	T 2–2 ^{SOL}	2,065	15–14–4 (11–10–4)
February 24	4:05 pm	at Army		Tate Rink • West Point, New York	FloHockey	Wallström	W 5–1	2,019	16–14–4 (12–10–4)
Atlantic Hockey Tournament
March 8	9:05 pm	at Air Force*		Cadet Ice Arena • Colorado Springs, Colorado (Quarterfinal Game 1)	FloHockey	Wallström	W 3–1	1,818	17–14–4
March 9	9:05 pm	at Air Force*		Cadet Ice Arena • Colorado Springs, Colorado (Quarterfinal Game 2)	FloHockey	Wallström	W 3–2 ^{OT}	1,688	18–14–4
March 15	7:00 pm	at Holy Cross*		Hart Center • Worcester, Massachusetts (Semifinal Game 1)	FloHockey	Wallström	L 2–5	796	18–15–4
March 16	7:00 pm	at Holy Cross*		Hart Center • Worcester, Massachusetts (Semifinal Game 2)	FloHockey	Wallström	W 3–0	787	19–15–4
March 17	5:00 pm	at Holy Cross*		Hart Center • Worcester, Massachusetts (Semifinal Game 3)	FloHockey	Wallström	W 3–1	656	20–15–4
March 23	7:05 pm	at #18 RIT*		Gene Polisseni Center • Henrietta, New York (Championship)	FloHockey	Wallström	L 2–5	4,233	20–16–4
*Non-conference game. ^{#}Rankings from USCHO.com Poll. All times are in Eastern Time. Source:

== Scoring statistics ==
Name	Position	Games	Goals	Assists	Points	PIM
Dustin Manz	C	39	7	24	31	28
Julius Janhonen	C	40	5	19	24	27
Jordan Biro	C	39	7	16	23	4
John Lundy	F	26	14	8	22	25
Brian Kramer	D	35	10	12	22	35
Alfred Lindberg	C	20	11	11	22	6
Alexander Malinowski	LW/RW	27	9	11	20	23
Brett Rylance	C/W	38	6	14	20	31
Austen Long	RW	38	8	8	16	27
Blake Wells	D	32	4	6	10	12
Brett Callahan	D	37	4	6	10	10
Oscar Geschwind	C	32	2	8	10	8
Nico Somerville	F	40	4	5	9	12
Tomi Leppänen	F	40	3	6	9	39
Evan Stella	D	40	3	5	8	37
Logan Jenuwine	F	23	1	6	7	12
Casey McDonald	F	31	4	3	7	22
Dario Beljo	C	16	2	4	6	12
Matt Rickard	D	25	2	4	6	8
Timofei Khokhlachev	LW	12	3	2	5	14
Josh Barnes	C	22	3	2	5	2
Hunter Jones	F	14	0	4	4	4
Theo Angesved	F	15	2	2	4	2
Casper Söderling	D	12	1	3	4	2
Grayson Dietrich	C/LW	19	2	1	3	18
Hunter Longhi	LW	8	1	2	3	0
Akseli Pennanen	F	7	0	1	1	0
Andrew Amousse	C	10	1	0	1	4
Darwin Lakoduk	F	12	0	0	0	4
Douglas Andersson	LW	7	0	0	0	6
Nils Wallström	G	33	0	0	0	0
Cole Hudson	G	1	0	0	0	0
Alexandros Aslanidis	G	9	0	0	0	0
Jake Sacratini	RW	2	0	0	0	0
Total			119	193	312	444

== Goaltending statistics ==
Name	Games	Minutes	Wins	Losses	Ties	Goals against	Saves	Shutouts	SV %	GAA
Cole Hudson	1	30:25	0	0	0	1	8	2	.889	1.97
Nils Wallström	33	1928:18	19	12	2	73	838	2	.920	2.27
Alexandros Aslanidis	10	445:04	1	4	2	28	184	0	.868	3.77
Empty Net	-	36:41	-	-	-	9	-	-	-	-
Total	40	2440:28	20	16	4	111	1031	2	.903	2.73

== Rankings ==
Poll	Week																										
Poll	Pre	1	2	3	4	5	6	7	8	9	10	11	12	13	14	15	16	17	18	19	20	21	22	23	24	25	26 (Final)
USCHO.com	NR	NR	NR	NR	NR	NR	NR	NR	NR	NR	NR	–	NR	NR	NR	NR	NR	NR	NR	NR	NR	NR	NR	NR	NR	–	NR
USA Hockey	NR	NR	NR	NR	NR	NR	NR	NR	NR	NR	NR	NR	–	NR	NR	NR	NR	NR	NR	NR	NR	NR	NR	NR	NR	NR	NR

Note: USCHO did not release a poll in weeks 11 and 25.
Note: USA Hockey did not release a poll in week 12.

== Awards and honors ==
Player	Award	Ref
Brian Kramer	Atlantic Hockey Best Defenseman	
Brian Kramer	Atlantic Hockey First Team	
Nils Wallström	Atlantic Hockey Rookie Team	
Nico Somerville	Atlantic Hockey All-Tournament Team	
Jordan Biro	Atlantic Hockey All-Tournament Team	
