= 2023–24 Robert Morris Colonials men's ice hockey season =

- Conference: 11th Atlantic Hockey
- Home ice: Clearview Arena

Rankings
- USCHO.com: NR
- USA Hockey: NR

Record
- Overall: 11–25–3
- Conference: 7–17–2
- Home: 5–12–1
- Road: 6–13–2

Coaches and captains
- Head coach: Derek Schooley
- Assistant coaches: Matt Nicholson; Ryan Durocher
- Captain: Rylee St. Onge
- Alternate captains: Mitch Andres; Gavin Gulash; Cameron Hebert; Luke Johnson; Dallas Tulik

The 2023–24 Robert Morris Colonials men's ice hockey season was the 18th season of play for the program and the 12th in Atlantic Hockey. The Colonials represented Robert Morris University, played their home games at the Clearview Arena and were coached by Derek Schooley in his 18th season.

== Season ==
With the team returning to the ice for the first time in over two years, the team accomplished its primary objective for the year simply by existing. There were few, if any, expectations for the team that still had to learn how to work together. Predictably, both the offense and defense were weak but neither were embarrassingly so; the Colonials averaged more than 2 goals per game despite suffering through a terrible stretch in the middle of the season. The team's porous defense surrendered an average of almost 40 shots per game and Robert Morris was routinely outshot throughout the season. While starter Chad Veltri faced an daunting task in most games, he did give the Colonials a chance to win on most nights. The Niagara transfer stopped well more than 90% of the shots he faced and led the nation in saves per game.

As the season progressed, Robert Morris was consistently ranked among the worst teams, but that didn't stop the Colonials from producing a few highlights. The shutout of Bowling Green in just their second game back was a welcome relief for the fans who hadn't seen the program win since 2021. While their road trip to Minneapolis resulted in two losses, RMU's defense stood strong against the highly-ranked Minnesota Golden Gophers. The best moment of the year, however, was probably the team's first playoff game. The RMU power play scored twice to give the team a 2-goal lead over Bentley entering the third period. While Robert Morris was unable to hold the lead, they still had a chance to win in overtime. Just before the end of the extra session, Cameron Garvey intercepted a pass behind the Falcons' cage and wrapped the puck around to score the winning goal. The team was unable to parlay their upset victory into any further success, but that did not detract from their successful return.

Off of the ice, the team had two very positive developments over the course of the year. The first was a deal struck with SportsNet Pittsburgh to broadcast select games for both the men's and women's teams. Not only would this increase the visibility of the program, but the additional funds would help to stability the program. Towards the end of the season, the university announced plans for a new $28 million arena and were seeking to have some of the cost offset by the state. While estimates put the completion for the project approximately three years away, the plans themselves demonstrated that the school was now expecting to keep its ice hockey team around for the foreseeable future.

== Departures ==
Note: All departures occurred after the 2020–21 season.

Player	Position	Nationality	Cause
Justin Addamo	Forward	France	Transferred to Rensselaer
Garrett Clegg	Forward	United States	Transferred to Oswego State
Reid Cooper	Goaltender	Canada	Transferred to Curry
Matt Guerra	Forward	United States	Transferred to Holy Cross
Santeri Hartikainen	Forward	Finland	Transferred to American International
Kyler Head	Forward	United States	Transferred to Mercyhurst
Grant Hebert	Forward	Canada	Transferred to Maine
Randy Hernández	Forward	United States	Transferred to Canisius
Nick Jenny	Defenseman	United States	Graduation (retired)
Roman Kraemer	Forward	United States	Left program (retired)
Brian Kramer	Defenseman	United States	Transferred to American International
David Lafrance	Defenseman	Canada	Returned to juniors (Halifax Mooseheads)
Nick Lalonde	Forward	Canada	Left program (retired)
Geoffrey Lawson	Forward	Canada	Left program (retired)
Tyler Love	Defenseman	United States	Transferred to Wisconsin–Eau Claire
Dyllan Lubbesmeyer	Goaltender	United States	Graduation (retired)
Brendon Michaelian	Defenseman	United States	Transferred to Ferris State
Nick Prkusic	Forward	United States	Graduation (retired)
Nolan Schaeffer	Forward	United States	Left program (retired)
Aidan Spellacy	Forward	United States	Transferred to St. Cloud State
Bradley Stonnell	Defenseman	United States	Transferred to Wisconsin–Superior
Jordan Timmons	Forward	United States	Transferred to Long Island
Darcy Walsh	Forward	Canada	Left program (retired)
Quinn Warmuth	Defenseman	United States	Transferred to Oswego State
Noah West	Goaltender	United States	Transferred to Michigan

== Recruiting ==
Due to the team being dormant for two years, the vast majority of the roster is made up of players new to the program. The Colonials have only three returning players: Gavin Gulash, Cameron Hebert and Matt Hutton

== Roster ==
As of September 15, 2023.

No.	Nat.	Player	Class	Pos	Height	Weight	DoB	Hometown	Previous team	NHL rights
2	(Canada)	Michael Craig	Freshman	D	5' 10" (1.78 m)	174 lb (79 kg)	2002-08-26	St. Catharines, Ontario	Nanaimo Clippers (BCHL)	—
3	(United States)	Mitch Andres (A)	Graduate	D	6' 1" (1.85 m)	187 lb (85 kg)	1998-09-02	Brainerd, Minnesota	Boston College (HEA)	—
4	(United States)	Matthew Boczar	Freshman (RS)	F	6' 1" (1.85 m)	185 lb (84 kg)	2001-05-13	Sewell, New Jersey	Northeast Generals (NAHL)	—
5	(United States)	Luke van Why	Freshman	D	5' 10" (1.78 m)	163 lb (74 kg)	2003-01-21	Hatfield, Pennsylvania	Maryland Black Bears (NAHL)	—
6	(Canada)	Cade Townend	Senior	D	6' 1" (1.85 m)	200 lb (91 kg)	1999-06-17	Carleton Place, Ontario	Mercyhurst (AHA)	—
7	(Canada)	Tom Gangl	Freshman	D	6' 3" (1.91 m)	201 lb (91 kg)	2002-01-08	Wingham, Ontario	Smiths Falls Bears (CCHL)	—
8	(United States)	Gabriel Lunn	Freshman	D	6' 0" (1.83 m)	190 lb (86 kg)	2003-08-25	Lockport, New York	Johnstown Tomahawks (NAHL)	—
9	(United States)	Dallas Tulik (A)	Graduate	F	6' 0" (1.83 m)	191 lb (87 kg)	1998-06-23	Kalamazoo, Michigan	Ferris State (CCHA)	—
10	(United States)	Paul Maust	Graduate	F	5' 10" (1.78 m)	170 lb (77 kg)	1998-06-24	Butler, Pennsylvania	Mercyhurst (AHA)	—
11	(Canada)	Cameron Hebert (A)	Senior	F	6' 1" (1.85 m)	175 lb (79 kg)	1999-03-17	St. Andrews West, Ontario	Johnstown Tomahawks (NAHL)	—
12	(United States)	Jackson Reineke	Freshman	F	5' 10" (1.78 m)	174 lb (79 kg)	2002-10-03	Faribault, Minnesota	Anchorage Wolverines (USHL)	—
15	(United States)	Charles Merkley	Freshman (RS)	F	5' 9" (1.75 m)	195 lb (88 kg)	2002-10-03	Fairport, New York	Corpus Christi IceRays (NAHL)	—
16	(Canada)	George Krotiris	Freshman	F	5' 11" (1.8 m)	165 lb (75 kg)	2002-08-08	Markham, Ontario	Cobourg Cougars (OJHL)	—
17	(United States)	Matt Hutton	Senior	F	6' 1" (1.85 m)	190 lb (86 kg)	1999-04-01	Carmel, Indiana	Shreveport Mudbugs (NAHL)	—
18	(United States)	Gavin Gulash (A)	Junior (RS)	F	6' 2" (1.88 m)	190 lb (86 kg)	1999-01-11	Red Bank, New Jersey	New Jersey Titans (NAHL)	—
19	(Canada)	Tanner Klimpke	Freshman	F	6' 2" (1.88 m)	174 lb (79 kg)	2002-12-13	Calgary, Alberta	Whitecourt Wolverines (AJHL)	—
20	(Canada)	McKay Hayes	Freshman	F	6' 2" (1.88 m)	205 lb (93 kg)	2002-01-27	Ancaster, Ontario	Markham Royals (OJHL)	—
21	(Canada)	Cameron Garvey	Freshman	F	6' 0" (1.83 m)	181 lb (82 kg)	2002-12-13	Oakville, Ontario	Collingwood Blues (OJHL)	—
22	(United States)	Dominic Schimizzi	Freshman (RS)	F	5' 11" (1.8 m)	175 lb (79 kg)	2001-03-12	Greensburg, Pennsylvania	Aberdeen Wings (NAHL)	—
23	(United States)	Luke Johnson (A)	Graduate	D	5' 11" (1.8 m)	173 lb (78 kg)	1999-01-07	Edina, Minnesota	Providence (HEA)	—
24	(United States)	Walter Zacher	Freshman	F	5' 11" (1.8 m)	181 lb (82 kg)	2002-04-02	Buffalo, New York	Austin Bruins (NAHL)	—
25	(Canada)	Trevor LeDonne	Junior	D	6' 1" (1.85 m)	192 lb (87 kg)	2000-02-27	Stoney Creek, Ontario	St. Thomas (CCHA)	—
27	(Canada)	Rylee St. Onge (C)	Graduate	F	5' 11" (1.8 m)	193 lb (88 kg)	1998-04-22	St. Catharines, Ontario	Mercyhurst (AHA)	—
28	(Canada)	Logan Ganie	Graduate	F	5' 11" (1.8 m)	185 lb (84 kg)	1999-06-28	Irma, Alberta	Michigan Tech (CCHA)	—
30	(United States)	Chad Veltri	Graduate	G	5' 11" (1.8 m)	187 lb (85 kg)	1998-06-03	Pittsburgh, Pennsylvania	Niagara (AHA)	—
31	(Canada)	Francis Boisvert	Graduate	G	6' 2" (1.88 m)	185 lb (84 kg)	1999-03-11	Blainville, Quebec	St. Lawrence (ECAC)	—
33	(Canada)	Lee Chiang	Freshman	F	5' 9" (1.75 m)	170 lb (77 kg)	2002-12-07	Toronto, Ontario	Markham Royals (OJHL)	—
35	(United States)	Michael Sochan	Freshman	F	6' 1" (1.85 m)	179 lb (81 kg)	2002-07-21	Redwood City, California	Surrey Eagles (BCHL)	—
44	(Canada)	Thomas Haynes	Freshman	F	6' 2" (1.88 m)	190 lb (86 kg)	2002-02-06	Mississauga, Ontario	Smiths Falls Bears (CCHL)	—

== Standings ==
2023–24 Atlantic Hockey Standings
	Conference record										Overall record					
	GP	W	L	T	OW	OL	SW	PTS	GF	GA	GP	W	L	T	GF	GA
#17 RIT †*	26	18	7	1	3	2	0	54	102	64	40	27	11	2	156	96
Holy Cross	26	13	10	3	0	3	1	46	78	62	39	21	14	4	116	93
Sacred Heart	26	14	10	2	2	2	1	45	75	70	36	14	19	3	91	113
Air Force	26	15	10	1	3	0	1	44	88	75	38	18	19	1	115	119
American International	26	12	10	4	1	1	2	42	79	68	40	20	16	4	119	111
Bentley	26	12	12	2	1	2	2	41	69	58	35	16	17	2	95	82
Niagara	26	13	10	3	3	1	1	41	78	79	39	18	18	3	111	122
Canisius	26	10	12	4	2	1	0	33	73	87	37	12	21	4	103	126
Mercyhurst	26	7	15	4	0	1	4	30	77	91	35	9	22	4	98	126
Army	26	8	16	2	0	1	1	28	66	96	35	10	23	2	93	139
Robert Morris	26	7	17	2	0	1	1	25	60	95	39	11	25	3	94	142
Championship: March 23, 2024 † indicates conference regular season champion (DeGregorio Trophy) * indicates conference tournament champion (Riley Trophy); Rankings: USCHO.com Top 20 Poll

== Schedule and results ==
Date	Time	Opponent^{#}	Rank^{#}	Site	TV	Decision	Result	Attendance	Record
Regular season
October 7	7:05 pm	Bowling Green*		Clearview Arena • Neville Township, Pennsylvania	FloHockey	Veltri	L 0–3	1,225	0–1–0
October 8	5:07 pm	at Bowling Green*		Slater Family Ice Arena • Bowling Green, Ohio	FloHockey	Veltri	W 3–0	1,345	1–1–0
October 14	4:00 pm	at Mercyhurst		Mercyhurst Ice Center • Erie, Pennsylvania	FloHockey	Veltri	T 3–3 ^{SOL}	582	1–1–1 (0–0–1)
October 20	7:00 pm	Holy Cross		Clearview Arena • Neville Township, Pennsylvania	FloHockey	Veltri	L 1–3	807	1–2–1 (0–1–1)
October 21	5:00 pm	Holy Cross		Clearview Arena • Neville Township, Pennsylvania	FloHockey	Veltri	T 3–3 ^{SOW}	604	1–2–2 (0–1–2)
October 27	7:00 pm	Bentley		Clearview Arena • Neville Township, Pennsylvania	FloHockey	Veltri	W 4–3	643	2–2–2 (1–1–2)
October 28	4:00 pm	Bentley		Clearview Arena • Neville Township, Pennsylvania	FloHockey	Veltri	L 0–3	619	2–3–2 (1–2–2)
November 4	7:00 pm	Simon Fraser*		Clearview Arena • Neville Township, Pennsylvania (Exhibition)	FloHockey	Boisvert	W 3–1	–	
November 10	11:00 pm	at Alaska Anchorage*		Avis Alaska Sports Complex • Anchorage, Alaska		Boisvert	L 2–3	700	2–4–2
November 11	10:00 pm	at Alaska Anchorage*		Avis Alaska Sports Complex • Anchorage, Alaska		Veltri	T 2–2 ^{OT}	506	2–4–3
November 17	7:00 pm	at Niagara		Dwyer Arena • Lewiston, New York	FloHockey	Veltri	L 2–6	1,066	2–5–3 (1–3–2)
November 18	7:00 pm	Niagara		Clearview Arena • Neville Township, Pennsylvania	FloHockey	Veltri	L 1–4	667	2–6–3 (1–4–2)
November 21	7:00 pm	at Canisius		LECOM Harborcenter • Buffalo, New York	FloHockey	Veltri	L 1–5	790	2–7–3 (1–5–2)
November 24	6:00 pm	Sacred Heart		Clearview Arena • Neville Township, Pennsylvania	FloHockey	Veltri	L 2–4	623	2–8–3 (1–6–2)
November 25	1:00 pm	Sacred Heart		Clearview Arena • Neville Township, Pennsylvania	FloHockey, SNY	Veltri	L 1–3	566	2–9–3 (1–7–2)
December 1	7:00 pm	at #19 RIT		Gene Polisseni Center • Henrietta, New York	FloHockey, SNP	Veltri	L 1–4	2,896	2–10–3 (1–8–2)
December 2	6:00 pm	at #19 RIT		Gene Polisseni Center • Henrietta, New York	FloHockey	Veltri	L 2–6	2,650	2–11–3 (1–9–2)
December 7	7:00 pm	Niagara		Clearview Arena • Neville Township, Pennsylvania	FloHockey, SNP	Veltri	W 4–1	514	3–11–3 (2–9–2)
December 9	7:00 pm	at Niagara		Dwyer Arena • Lewiston, New York	FloHockey	Veltri	W 3–1	693	4–11–3 (3–9–2)
December 16	7:00 pm	#13 Arizona State*		Clearview Arena • Neville Township, Pennsylvania	FloHockey	Veltri	L 1–4	863	4–12–3
December 17	5:00 pm	#13 Arizona State*		Clearview Arena • Neville Township, Pennsylvania	FloHockey, SNP	Veltri	L 3–8	732	4–13–3
January 5	7:00 pm	Stonehill*		Clearview Arena • Neville Township, Pennsylvania	FloHockey	Veltri	W 8–1	606	5–13–3
January 6	5:00 pm	Stonehill*		Clearview Arena • Neville Township, Pennsylvania	FloHockey	Veltri	W 7–3	658	6–13–3
January 12	8:00 pm	at #12 Minnesota*		3M Arena at Mariucci • Minneapolis, Minnesota	Fox 9+, BTN+	Boisvert	L 2–4	8,449	6–14–3
January 13	6:00 pm	at #12 Minnesota*		3M Arena at Mariucci • Minneapolis, Minnesota	Fox 9+, BTN+	Veltri	L 1–4	9,475	6–15–3
January 19	7:00 pm	#20 RIT		Clearview Arena • Neville Township, Pennsylvania	FloHockey, SNP	Veltri	L 3–6	592	6–16–3 (3–10–2)
January 20	7:00 pm	#20 RIT		Clearview Arena • Neville Township, Pennsylvania	FloHockey	Veltri	L 1–7	805	6–17–3 (3–11–2)
January 26	1:00 pm	at American International		MassMutual Center • Springfield, Massachusetts	FloHockey	Boisvert	W 2–0	—	7–17–3 (4–11–2)
January 27	1:00 pm	at American International		MassMutual Center • Springfield, Massachusetts	FloHockey	Veltri	L 2–5	256	7–18–3 (4–12–2)
February 2	7:00 pm	at Mercyhurst		Mercyhurst Ice Center • Erie, Pennsylvania	FloHockey	Boisvert	W 5–2	1,042	8–18–3 (5–12–2)
February 3	7:00 pm	Mercyhurst		Clearview Arena • Neville Township, Pennsylvania	FloHockey	Boisvert	W 4–3	759	9–18–3 (6–12–2)
February 9	7:00 pm	at Army		Tate Rink • West Point, New York	FloHockey	Veltri	L 1–3	1,708	9–19–3 (6–13–2)
February 10	6:00 pm	at Army		Tate Rink • West Point, New York	FloHockey	Veltri	W 4–3	1,734	10–19–3 (7–13–2)
February 16	7:00 pm	Canisius		Clearview Arena • Neville Township, Pennsylvania	FloHockey	Boisvert	L 3–5	619	10–20–3 (7–14–2)
February 17	5:00 pm	Canisius		Clearview Arena • Neville Township, Pennsylvania	FloHockey, SNP	Veltri	L 4–5 ^{OT}	1,008	10–21–3 (7–15–2)
February 23	9:00 pm	at Air Force		Cadet Ice Arena • Colorado Springs, Colorado	FloHockey	Veltri	L 2–5	2,670	10–22–3 (7–16–2)
February 24	7:00 pm	at Air Force		Cadet Ice Arena • Colorado Springs, Colorado	FloHockey	Boisvert	L 1–2	2,698	10–23–3 (7–17–2)
Atlantic Hockey Tournament
March 2	7:00 pm	at Bentley*		Bentley Arena • Waltham, Massachusetts (First Round)	FloHockey	Veltri	W 4–3 ^{OT}	1,678	11–23–3
March 8	7:05 pm	at #19 RIT*		Gene Polisseni Center • Henrietta, New York (Quarterfinal Game 1)	FloHockey	Veltri	L 0–7	2,988	11–24–3
March 9	7:05 pm	at #19 RIT*		Gene Polisseni Center • Henrietta, New York (Quarterfinal Game 2)	FloHockey	Veltri	L 1–5	3,248	11–25–3
*Non-conference game. ^{#}Rankings from USCHO.com Poll. All times are in Eastern Time. Source:

== Scoring statistics ==
Name	Position	Games	Goals	Assists	Points	PIM
Tanner Klimpke	F	37	15	11	26	14
Dallas Tulik	F	37	6	17	23	24
Walter Zacher	C	33	5	17	22	22
Jackson Reineke	F	37	9	12	21	43
Rylee St. Onge	LW	38	11	9	20	45
Logan Ganie	LW	35	6	9	15	6
Cameron Garvey	C	37	11	3	14	19
McKay Hayes	C	38	6	8	14	35
Cade Townend	D	38	4	10	14	26
Luke Johnson	D	39	2	11	13	10
George Krotiris	W	36	6	6	12	19
Michael Craig	D	39	0	10	10	8
Gavin Gulash	F	38	2	7	9	35
Paul Maust	LW	36	3	4	7	41
Cameron Hebert	RW	33	2	5	7	20
Gabriel Lunn	D	29	1	5	6	18
Luke van Why	D	18	2	2	4	8
Mitch Andres	D	33	0	4	4	35
Dominic Schimizzi	F	16	2	1	3	10
Matthew Boczar	F	11	1	1	2	0
Francis Boisvert	G	13	0	1	1	0
Tom Gangl	G	22	0	1	1	6
Trevor Ledonne	D	29	0	1	1	43
Chad Veltri	G	32	0	1	1	0
Michael Sochan	G	2	0	0	0	0
Lee Chiang	F	3	0	0	0	0
Matt Hutton	F	3	0	0	0	2
Charles Merkley	RW	9	0	0	0	0
Thomas Haynes	D	12	0	0	0	4
Total			94	156	250	493

== Goaltending statistics ==
Name	Games	Minutes	Wins	Losses	Ties	Goals against	Saves	Shut outs	SV %	GAA
Michael Sochan	3	7:32	0	0	0	0	8	0	1.000	0.00
Francis Boisvert	13	537:34	3	4	0	28	349	1	.926	3.13
Chad Veltri	32	1819:58	8	21	3	105	1054	1	.909	3.46
Empty Net	-	11:00	-	-	-	9	-	-	-	-
Total	39	2376:04	11	25	3	142	1411	2	.909	3.59

== Rankings ==
Poll	Week																										
Poll	Pre	1	2	3	4	5	6	7	8	9	10	11	12	13	14	15	16	17	18	19	20	21	22	23	24	25	26 (Final)
USCHO.com	NR	NR	NR	NR	NR	NR	NR	NR	NR	NR	NR	–	NR	NR	NR	NR	NR	NR	NR	NR	NR	NR	NR	NR	NR	–	NR
USA Hockey	NR	NR	NR	NR	NR	NR	NR	NR	NR	NR	NR	NR	–	NR	NR	NR	NR	NR	NR	NR	NR	NR	NR	NR	NR	NR	NR

Note: USCHO did not release a poll in weeks 11 and 25.
Note: USA Hockey did not release a poll in week 12.
