= Brian Riley (ice hockey) =

American ice hockey coach (born 1959)

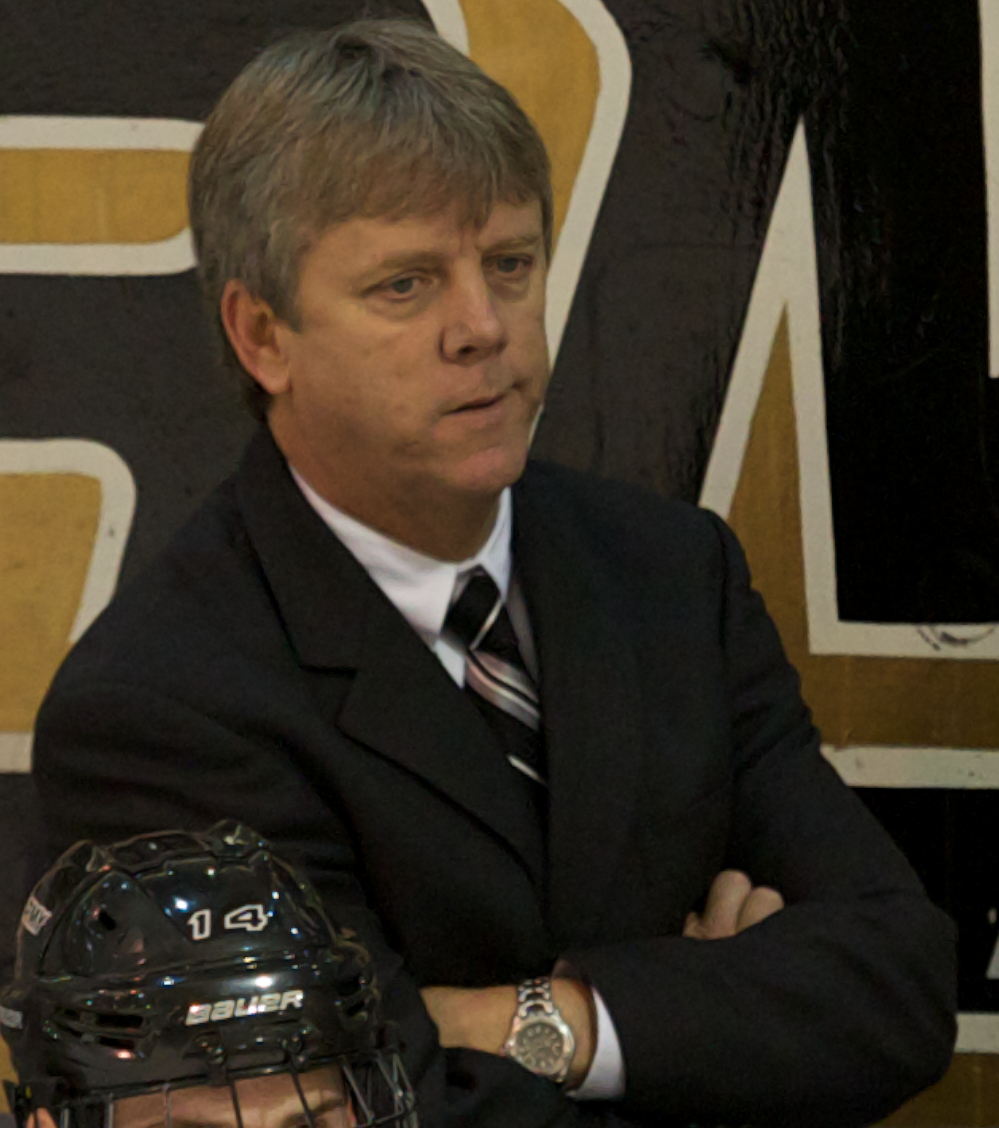
- Riley at Tate Rink in 2012

Biographical details
- Born: July 19, 1959 (age 67); West Point, New York, U.S.

Playing career
- 1977–1978: New Hampton School
- 1978–1979: Waterloo Black Hawks
- 1979–1983: Brown
- Position: Forward

Coaching career (HC unless noted)
- 1984–1987: SUNY-Plattsburgh (assistant)
- 1987–1988: Lowell (assistant)
- 1989–1996: Army (assistant)
- 1996–1998: Shattuck-Saint Mary's
- 1999–2004: Army (assistant)
- 2004–2025: Army

Head coaching record
- Overall: 258–379–94 (.417)

Accomplishments and honors

Championships
- 2008 Atlantic Hockey Regular Season Champion

Awards
- 2006 Atlantic Hockey Coach of the Year; 2007 Atlantic Hockey Coach of the Year; 2008 Atlantic Hockey Coach of the Year; 2021 Atlantic Hockey Coach of the Year

Brian Riley (born July 19, 1959) is an American retired ice hockey coach who was the third consecutive member of his family to coach at Army.

== Career ==
Brian Riley made his debut at the college ranks as a freshman for Brown in 1979. While the team didn't enjoy much success in his four years there, Riley was able to use the experience to begin a college coaching career a year after graduating in 1983 when he became an assistant at SUNY-Plattsburgh. After three seasons Riley jumped up to the Division I ranks with Lowell but remained at the job for only one season.

Riley returned to his hometown of West Point in 1989–90 as an assistant coach under his brother Rob, remaining there until 1996 when he left to take on his first head coaching job at Shattuck-Saint Mary's, a preeminent prep school. Riley coached the Sabres for two years before leaving to return to West Point, remaining as an assistant until his brother stepped down as head coach in 2004, making way for Brian to run the family business.

Since taking control of the team Riley has led the Black Knights through a relatively stable period in the program's history, having remained in the same conference for at least his first ten seasons and even producing a conference regular season title in 2007–08 (Army's first). On August 21, 2024, Riley announced that he would retire following the 2024–25 season, bringing a 75-year run of Rileys behind the Black Knights' bench to a close.

== Head coaching record ==
Record table
Season	Team	Overall	Conference	Standing	Postseason
Army Black Knights (Atlantic Hockey) (2004–2024)
2004–05	Army	7–21–3	5–16–3	8th	Atlantic Hockey Quarterfinals
2005–06	Army	12–18–6	10–12–6	5th	Atlantic Hockey Quarterfinals
2006–07	Army	17–12–5	15–8–5	3rd	Atlantic Hockey Runner-Up
2007–08	Army	19–14–4	17–8–3	1st	Atlantic Hockey Semifinals
2008–09	Army	11–19–6	10–12–6	6th	Atlantic Hockey Quarterfinals
2009–10	Army	11–18–7	10–12–6	6th	Atlantic Hockey Quarterfinals
2010–11	Army	11–20–4	10–13–4	9th	Atlantic Hockey First Round
2011–12	Army	4–23–7	3–19–5	12th	Atlantic Hockey First Round
2012–13	Army	7–22–5	7–15–5	11th	Atlantic Hockey First Round
2013–14	Army	6–28–0	5–22–0	12th	Atlantic Hockey First Round
2014–15	Army	8–22–4	8–16–4	9th	Atlantic Hockey First Round
2015–16	Army	14–15–9	8–11–9	t-6th	Atlantic Hockey Semifinals
2016–17	Army	18–14–5	15–10–3	t-3rd	Atlantic Hockey Semifinals
2017–18	Army	15–15–6	12–10–6	t-3rd	Atlantic Hockey Quarterfinals
2018–19	Army	12–20–7	8–13–7	10th	Atlantic Hockey Quarterfinals
2019–20	Army	17–13–3	14–11–3	4th	Tournament Cancelled
2020–21	Army	15–6–1	10–4–1	2nd	Atlantic Hockey Semifinals
2021–22	Army	14–17–4	12–11–3	3rd	Atlantic Hockey Quarterfinals
2022–23	Army	14–19–4	12–12–2	5th	Atlantic Hockey Quarterfinals
2023–24	Army	10–23–2	8–16–2	10th	Atlantic Hockey Quarterfinals
Army:		242–359–92	199–251–83		
Army Black Knights (AHA) (2024–2025)
2024–25	Army	16–20–2	14–10–2	5th	AHA Semifinals
Army:		16–20–2	14–10–2		
Total:		258–379–94			
National champion Postseason invitational champion Conference regular season champion Conference regular season and conference tournament champion Division regular season champion Division regular season and conference tournament champion Conference tournament champion

Awards and achievements
Preceded by Rand Pecknold; Eric Lang	Atlantic Hockey Coach of the Year; 2005–06, 2006–07, 2007–08; 2020–21 (with Derek Schooley)	Succeeded by Ryan Soderquist; Eric Lang
