= Derek Schooley =

American ice hockey player and coach

Current position
- Title: Head coach
- Team: Robert Morris
- Conference: Atlantic Hockey

Biographical details
- Born: October 4, 1970 (age 56); St. Louis, Missouri
- Education: Western Michigan

Playing career
- 1989–1990: Omaha Lancers
- 1990–1994: Western Michigan
- 1994–1996: Huntington Blizzard
- 1995–1996: Quad City Mallards
- 1995–1996: Flint Generals
- 1995–1996: Roanoke Express
- 1996–1997: Pensacola Ice Pilots
- 1996–1997: Peoria Rivermen
- Position: Defenseman

Coaching career (HC unless noted)
- 1996–1997: Chicago Freeze (assistant)
- 1997–1998: Cornell (assistant)
- 1998–2004: Air Force (assistant)
- 2002: USA U-18 (assistant)
- 2004–Present: Robert Morris

Head coaching record
- Overall: 312–341–79 (.480)
- Tournaments: 0–1

Accomplishments and honors

Championships
- 1996 Colonial League Champion (player); 1996 Colonial Cup Champion (player); 2014 Atlantic Hockey tournament champion 2015 Atlantic Hockey regular season champion 2016 Atlantic Hockey regular season champion

Awards
- 2015 Atlantic Hockey Coach of the Year; 2021 Atlantic Hockey Coach of the Year

Derek Schooley (born October 4, 1970) is an American ice hockey head coach and former player. Since 2004 he has been the head coach for Robert Morris, with his tenure interrupted during the program's 2021-23 disbandment.

== Career ==
Hailing from St. Louis, Schooley was unheralded coming out of high school and spent a year with the Omaha Lancers under Frank Serratore. Schooley led the USHL in scoring by a defenseman for his lone season in the league, helping Omaha capture both the regular season and Championship titles, a first for Lancers. After being named to the USHL All-Star second team Schooley joined the program at Western Michigan.

Schooley played for the Broncos for four seasons, improving his point total each season, but remained a relatively unknown player outside of Kalamazoo. The Broncos had a fair amount of success while schooley was there, making two conference semifinals as well as only their second tournament appearance in 1994. After graduating with a degree in Communications Schooley embarked on a brief professional career, spending the 1994–95 season with the Huntington Blizzard before bouncing between four teams the following year. Schooley retires after four games in 1996-97 and joined the Chicago Freeze as both an assistant coach and scouting director.

Schooley returned to the college ranks in 1997 as an assistant for Cornell but left after a season to join his former junior coach Serratore at Air Force in a similar role. Schooley was assigned to coach the team's defense and twice set the program record for lowest goals against per game during his time there. After serving as an assistant on the USA under-18 team at the junior world cup and a year later found himself promoted to associate head coach of the Falcons.

In the summer of 2004 Robert Morris University announced that they were adding several new sports as fully funded programs, including men's ice hockey. Two days after the press conference Schooley was signed on as the team's new head coach. Robert Morris joined the CHA straight away due to the conference having just lost Findlay after their program was demoted to club status. The Colonials finished in last place their first season, but only one point behind Air Force in the conference standings. Over the next four seasons Schooley led to the team to an increasing win total, topping out at 15 in 2007–08 with his first graduating class of seniors. The Colonials dipped a bit in the two years following but while Schooley was building his program, his conference was collapsing.

The CHA had lost Air Force to Atlantic Hockey in 2006 while Wayne State shuttered their program two years later. With only four teams left the conference was on its last legs (NCAA bylaws stipulated that conferences needed to have a minimum of six teams to qualify for an automatic tournament bid). When Bemidji State left for the WCHA in 2010 two of the remaining three schools joined Atlantic Hockey and the CHA was disbanded.

The Colonials found a new level of success in their new home, posting their first winning season in 2010–11 and continued the upwards swing by taking their first conference tournament title in 2014. Robert Morris' first appearance in the NCAA tournament saw them pitted against #1 seed Minnesota where they predictable lost. Schooley's team followed up their surprising season by capturing the Atlantic Hockey regular season crown in 2015, going 24-8-5 and a second the following year. Unfortunately Robert Morris was unable to win the conference tournament in either of those years and was left out of the NCAA championship. Schooley's teams have finished as conference runner-ups in each of the last three seasons (as of 2018).

== Head coaching record ==
Record table
Season	Team	Overall	Conference	Standing	Postseason
Robert Morris Colonials (CHA) (2004–2010)
2004–05	Robert Morris	8–21–4	4–14–2	6th	CHA Quarterfinals
2005–06	Robert Morris	12–20–3	7–11–2	T–4th	CHA Semifinals
2006–07	Robert Morris	14–19–2	9–10–1	3rd	CHA runner-up
2007–08	Robert Morris	15–15–4	10–7–3	3rd	CHA Semifinals
2008–09	Robert Morris	10–19–7	5–8–5	3rd	CHA runner-up
2009–10	Robert Morris	10–19–6	6–9–3	2nd	CHA third-place game (Tie)
Robert Morris:		69–113–26 (.394)	41–59–16		
Robert Morris Colonials (Atlantic Hockey) (2011–2024)
2010–11	Robert Morris	18–12–5	13–9–5	5th	Atlantic Hockey first round
2011–12	Robert Morris	17–17–5	13–9–5	7th	Atlantic Hockey Quarterfinals
2012–13	Robert Morris	20–14–4	13–11–3	5th	Atlantic Hockey Quarterfinals
2013–14	Robert Morris	19–18–5	13–9–5	5th	NCAA West regional semifinals
2014–15	Robert Morris	24–8–5	19–5–4	1st	Atlantic Hockey Semifinals
2015–16	Robert Morris	24–11–4	18–6–4	1st	Atlantic Hockey Runner-Up
2016–17	Robert Morris	22–12–4	15–10–3	T–3rd	Atlantic Hockey Runner-Up
2017–18	Robert Morris	18–20–3	12–13–3	T–6th	Atlantic Hockey Runner-Up
2018–19	Robert Morris	16–22–2	11–15–2	T–8th	Atlantic Hockey Semifinals
2019–20	Robert Morris	13–19–5	11–12–5–3	T–6th	Tournament Cancelled
2020–21	Robert Morris	15–9–0	10–5–0	3rd	Atlantic Hockey Quarterfinals
2023–24	Robert Morris	11–25–3	7–17–2	11th	Atlantic Hockey Quarterfinals
Robert Morris:		217–187–45 (.533)	142–121–41		
Robert Morris Colonials (AHA) (2024–present)
2024–25	Robert Morris	10–20–5	7–15–4	10th	AHA First Round
2025–26	Robert Morris	16–21–3	13–11–2	T–3rd	AHA Semifinals
Robert Morris:		26–41–8	20–26–6		
Total:		312–341–79 (.480)			
National champion Postseason invitational champion Conference regular season champion Conference regular season and conference tournament champion Division regular season champion Division regular season and conference tournament champion Conference tournament champion

Awards and achievements
Preceded by Rick Gotkin; Eric Lang	Atlantic Hockey Coach of the Year; 2014–15; 2020–21 (with Brian Riley)	Succeeded by Frank Serratore; Eric Lang
