= Eric Lang (ice hockey) =

American ice hockey player and coach

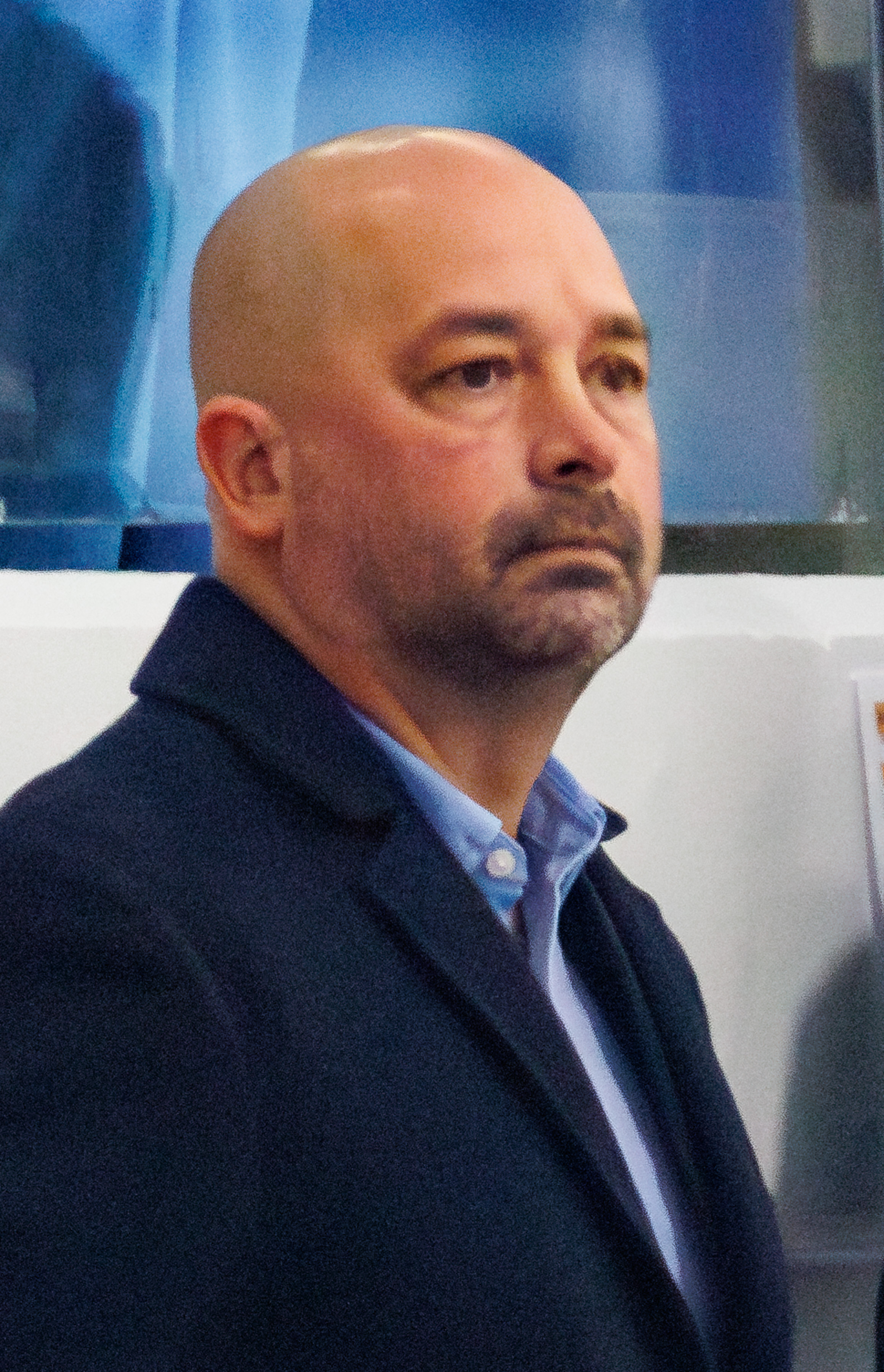
- Lang while at AIC

Current position
- Title: Head coach
- Team: Rensselaer
- Conference: ECAC Hockey

Biographical details
- Born: August 6, 1975 (age 51); The Bronx, New York, U.S.
- Education: American International

Playing career
- 1994–1998: American International
- Position: Forward

Coaching career (HC unless noted)
- 2006–2008: American International (graduate assistant)
- 2008–2011: Manhattanville College (women)
- 2011–2012: Manhattanville College
- 2012–2016: Army (assistant)
- 2016–2025: American International
- 2025–present: Rensselaer

Head coaching record
- Overall: 168–147–33 (.530)
- Tournaments: 1–3 (.250)

Accomplishments and honors

Championships
- 2019 Atlantic Hockey Champion; 2019 Atlantic Hockey Tournament champion 2020 Atlantic Hockey Champion; 2021 Atlantic Hockey Champion; 2021 Atlantic Hockey tournament champion 2022 Atlantic Hockey Champion; 2022 Atlantic Hockey tournament champion

Awards
- 3× Atlantic Hockey Coach of the Year (2019, 2020, 2022)

Eric Lang (born August 6, 1975) is an American former ice hockey forward and current head coach for the RPI Engineers men's ice hockey team. He previously was the head coach at his alma mater American International.

== Career ==
Lang started his college career at American International, playing for the team while it was still in the Division III ranks. After four seasons with the Yellow Jackets he graduated with a BA in psychology. Lang worked for the NHL as an off-ice official and coached at Byram Hills High School for four years before returning to Springfield, Massachusetts to earn a graduate degree. While working towards a master's in organizational development Lang served as a graduate assistant for the men's ice hockey team at AIC from 2006 until graduating in 2008.

With his degree in hand Lang was immediately hired as the head coach of the women's program at Manhattanville College, spending three seasons with the team until he took over the duties as bench boss of the men's team in 2011. Lang spent only one season with the program before joining the staff at Army first as a volunteer assistant and then as a full-time assistant coach for the Black Knights. After four years under the tutelage of Brian Riley Lang accepted the head coaching position with his alma mater, replacing long-time coach Gary Wright.

Taking over a team that in 2016 ranked 60th of 60 Division I teams, Lang recruited Europeans who wanted a good education while playing hockey, and used a European playing style emphasizing puck possession. In his first season as head coach AIC's 8-20-8 record was not unusually bad compared to the team's history. In his second season Lang led the team to 15 wins, the most since 1993. In Lang's third season AIC won both the Atlantic Hockey regular season and tournament titles and led the Yellow Jackets to their first ever NCAA tournament appearance.

Lang remained in charge at AIC until the program was downgraded to Division II following the 2024–25 season. Shortly after the year, Rensselaer hired Lang as the program's 14th head coach.

== Head coaching record ==
Record table
| Season | Team | Overall | Conference | Standing | Postseason |
|---|---|---|---|---|---|
Manhattanville Valiants (ECAC West) (2011–2012)
| 2011–12 | Manhattanville | 13–9–3 | 6–6–0 | 2nd | ECAC West Semifinal |
| Manhattanville: | | 13–9–3 (.580) | 6–6–0 (.500) | | |
American International Yellow Jackets (Atlantic Hockey) (2016–2024)
| 2016–17 | American International | 8–20–8 | 7–14–7 | 10th | Atlantic Hockey First Round |
| 2017–18 | American International | 15–20–4 | 11–13–4 | 8th | Atlantic Hockey Quarterfinals |
| 2018–19 | American International | 23–17–1 | 18–9–1 | 1st | NCAA Regional Finals |
| 2019–20 | American International | 21–12–1 | 21–6–1 | 1st | Tournaments Cancelled |
| 2020–21 | American International | 15–4–0 | 11–1–0 | 1st | NCAA Regional Semifinals |
| 2021–22 | American International | 22–12–3 | 17–7–2 | 1st | NCAA Regional Semifinals |
| 2022–23 | American International | 18–14–7 | 14–8–4 | 2nd | Atlantic Hockey Quarterfinals |
| 2023–24 | American International | 20–16–4 | 12–10–4 | 5th | Atlantic Hockey Runner-Up |
| American International: | | 142–115–28 | 111–68–23 | | |
American International Yellow Jackets (AHA) (2024–2025)
| 2024–25 | American International | 13–23–2 | 9–16–1 | 8th | AHA Quarterfinals |
| American International: | | 13–23–2 | 9–16–1 | | |
Rensselaer Engineers (ECAC Hockey) (2025–present)
| 2025–26 | Rensselaer | | | | |
| Total: | | 168–147–33 (.530) | | | |
National champion Postseason invitational champion Conference regular season champion Conference regular season and conference tournament champion Division regular season champion Division regular season and conference tournament champion Conference tournament champion

Awards and achievements
| Preceded by Rick Gotkin; Brian Riley / Derek Schooley | Atlantic Hockey Coach of the Year; 2018–19, 2019–20; 2021–22 | Succeeded by Brian Riley / Derek Schooley; Wayne Wilson |
