= Atlantic Hockey Coach of the Year =

- Sport: Ice hockey
- Awarded for: The Coach of the Year in the Atlantic Hockey Association

History
- First award: 2004
- Final award: 2024
- Most recent: Wayne Wilson

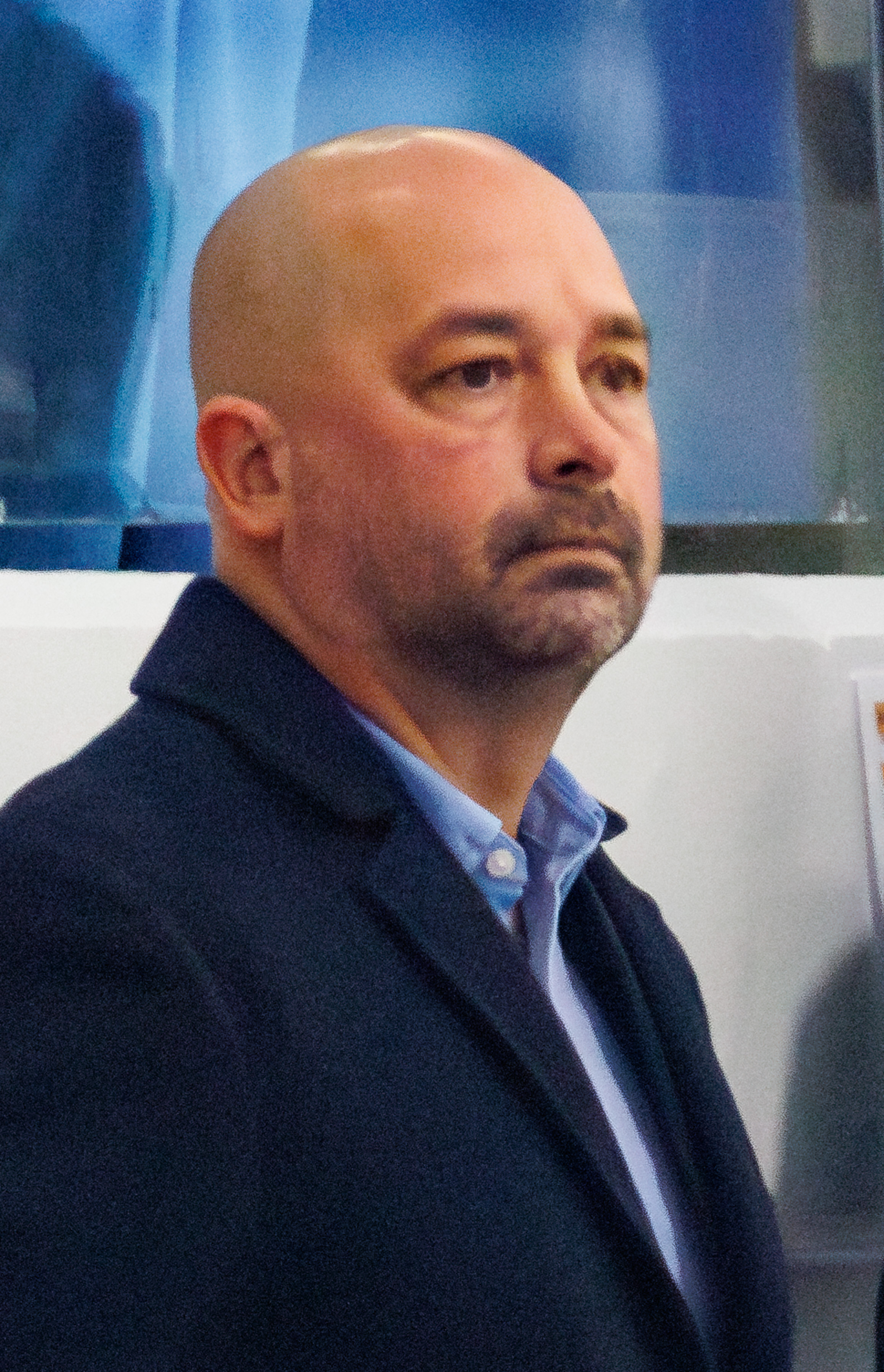
Three-time winner Eric Lang

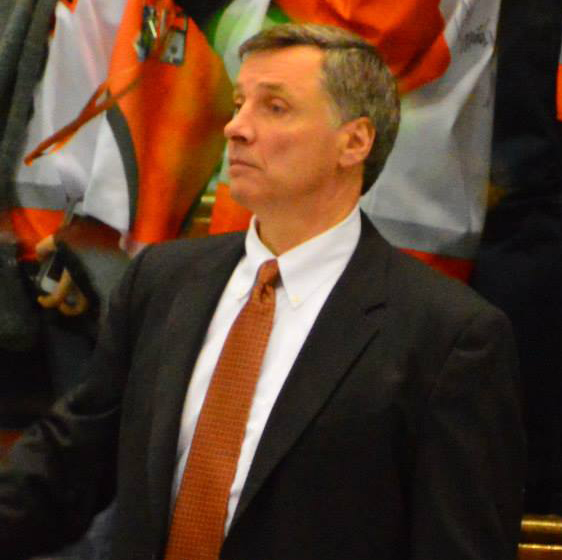
Two-time winner Wayne Wilson

The Atlantic Hockey Coach of the Year was an annual award given out at the conclusion of the Atlantic Hockey regular season to the top coach in the conference as voted by the coaches of each Atlantic Hockey team.

== Award winners ==
Year	Winner	School
2003–04	Paul Pearl	Holy Cross
2004–05	Rand Pecknold	Quinnipiac
2005–06	Brian Riley	Army
2006–07	Brian Riley	Army
2007–08	Brian Riley	Army
2008–09	Ryan Soderquist	Bentley
2009–10	C. J. Marottolo	Sacred Heart
2010–11	Paul Pearl	Holy Cross
2011–12	Ryan Soderquist	Bentley
2012–13	Dave Burkholder	Niagara
2013–14	Rick Gotkin	Mercyhurst

Year	Winner	School
2014–15	Derek Schooley	Robert Morris
2015–16	Frank Serratore	Air Force
2016–17	Dave Smith	Canisius
2017–18	Rick Gotkin	Mercyhurst
2018–19	Eric Lang	American International
2019–20	Eric Lang	American International
2020–21	Brian Riley	Army
2020–21	Derek Schooley	Robert Morris
2021–22	Eric Lang	American International
2022–23	Wayne Wilson	RIT
2023–24	Wayne Wilson	RIT

=== Winners by school ===
School	Winners
Army	4
American International	3
Bentley	2
Holy Cross	2
Mercyhurst	2
Robert Morris	2
Air Force	1
Canisius	1
Niagara	1
Quinnipiac	1
RIT	1
Sacred Heart	1

=== Multiple Awards ===
Name	Awards
Brian Riley	4
Eric Lang	3
Rick Gotkin	2
Paul Pearl	2
Derek Schooley	2
Ryan Soderquist	2
Wayne Wilson	2
