= Robert Morris Colonials men's ice hockey =

- Current season
- University: Robert Morris University
- Conference: AHA
- Head coach: Derek Schooley; 21st season, 312–341–79 (.480)
- Assistant coaches: Marco Treviño; Jacob Zab; Vincent Pietrangelo
- Arena: Island Sports Center; Neville Township, Pennsylvania
- Colors: Blue, white, and red

NCAA tournament appearances
- 2014

Conference tournament champions
- AHA: 2014

Conference regular season champions
- AHA: 2015, 2016

Current uniform

The Robert Morris Colonials men's ice hockey team is a National Collegiate Athletic Association (NCAA) Division I college ice hockey program that represents Robert Morris University. The team plays its home games at the Clearview Arena, located at the RMU Island Sports Center in Neville Township, Pennsylvania, United States. The Colonials are members of Atlantic Hockey America, formed shortly after the 2023–24 season by the merger of RMU's former men's league of the Atlantic Hockey Association and the women-only College Hockey America (CHA), in which RMU had been a member. The Colonials men had been members of CHA until its men's division disbanded at the end of the 2009–10 season.

== History ==
Robert Morris had a successful club hockey team for several years before rumors started circulating in the early 2000s that the school would create an NCAA Division I program. In December 2002, reports first surfaced that the school was interested in purchasing the RMU Island Sports Center, which would house a men's and women's ice hockey team. On August 8, 2003, the school officially purchased the 32-acre complex – complete with a 1,100-seat hockey arena – for $10 million. The complex is located in Neville Island, only a few miles from RMU's campus in Moon Township. Just 12 days later, on August 20, 2003, Robert Morris athletic director Susan Hofacre officially announced that the Colonials would field an NCAA men's ice hockey team for the 2004–05 season. At the same time, the school added men's and women's lacrosse and women's field hockey as part of an expansion of the athletic department. Two days later, the school hired former Western Michigan defenceman Derek Schooley as its first head coach.

In January 2004, before the school had ever played a game, they were accepted into the College Hockey America conference. Typically, most new NCAA schools play as an Independent in their first years, but a unique series of events led to RMU being immediately accepted into the conference. The fledgling six-team conference was first given an automatic bid to the 2003 NCAA tournament. However, in January 2004, CHA member Findlay announced it would drop hockey from its athletic program effective at the end of the 2003–04 season. This left the CHA one team short of the six required to keep their automatic bid into the NCAA tournament. As RMU was the only NCAA team not already attached to a conference, the CHA invited RMU to join immediately for the 2004–05 season. The school accepted on January 29, 2004.

Schooley quickly moved to secure the Colonials' first recruiting class and hired two assistant coaches. Nevertheless, the Colonials were predictably overmatched in their first year as an NCAA team. The young squad consisted of 22 freshmen and no seniors as Schooley built for the school's future. In its first season, the Colonials finished last in the conference with an 8–21–4 record.

At the start of the 2005–06 season, the Colonials were reminded how much work the program needed to do when they were stunned by the Penn State University club team in a 3–2 exhibition loss prior to the season. Two games later, however, RMU shocked CCHA member Western Michigan in a 5–2 victory that Schooley called "the biggest win for our program." The Colonials improved to 12–20–3 in their second season while advancing to the CHA semifinals for the first time.

In 2006–07, the Colonials improved yet again, finishing 14–19–2. On January 7, 2007, the Colonials beat nationally ranked Notre Dame for their first ever victory over a ranked team. The squad advanced to the CHA tournament final, where they came up just short of qualifying for their first ever NCAA tournament against Alabama–Huntsville. The Colonials jumped out to a 4–0 first period lead and looked set for their first conference championship before the Chargers mounted a frantic comeback that ended with a 5–4 overtime victory.

It was more of the same for the Colonials over the next two years. In 2007–08, the squad finished a school-record 15–15–4 (including a win over #8 ranked Boston University) but again came up short in the CHA tournament. In 2008–09, the school finished only 10–19–7 before reaching the CHA tournament final against Bemidji State. Once again, the Colonials were left heartbroken, as they lost in overtime for the second time in three years.

By this time, it was clear that the CHA men's division would soon disband. In 2006, Air Force left the league, leaving the conference with only five teams (one short of the six required to retain the NCAA autobid). Given two years to keep their autobid before losing it, the CHA began the search for a sixth member – likely a club team, as all current Division I teams were already in a conference. After no school expressed interest in joining, Wayne State announced just prior to the 2007–08 season that they would disband their team following the season. Following Wayne State's departure, saving the CHA was all but impossible, and Robert Morris applied for membership into Atlantic Hockey (AHA). In January 2009, the AHA announced that both RMU and Niagara's applications were unanimously approved, paving the way for the schools to join the conference for the 2010–11 season. Robert Morris and Penn State were the hosts of the inaugural Three Rivers Classic NCAA hockey tournament at the Consol Energy Center in December, 2012.

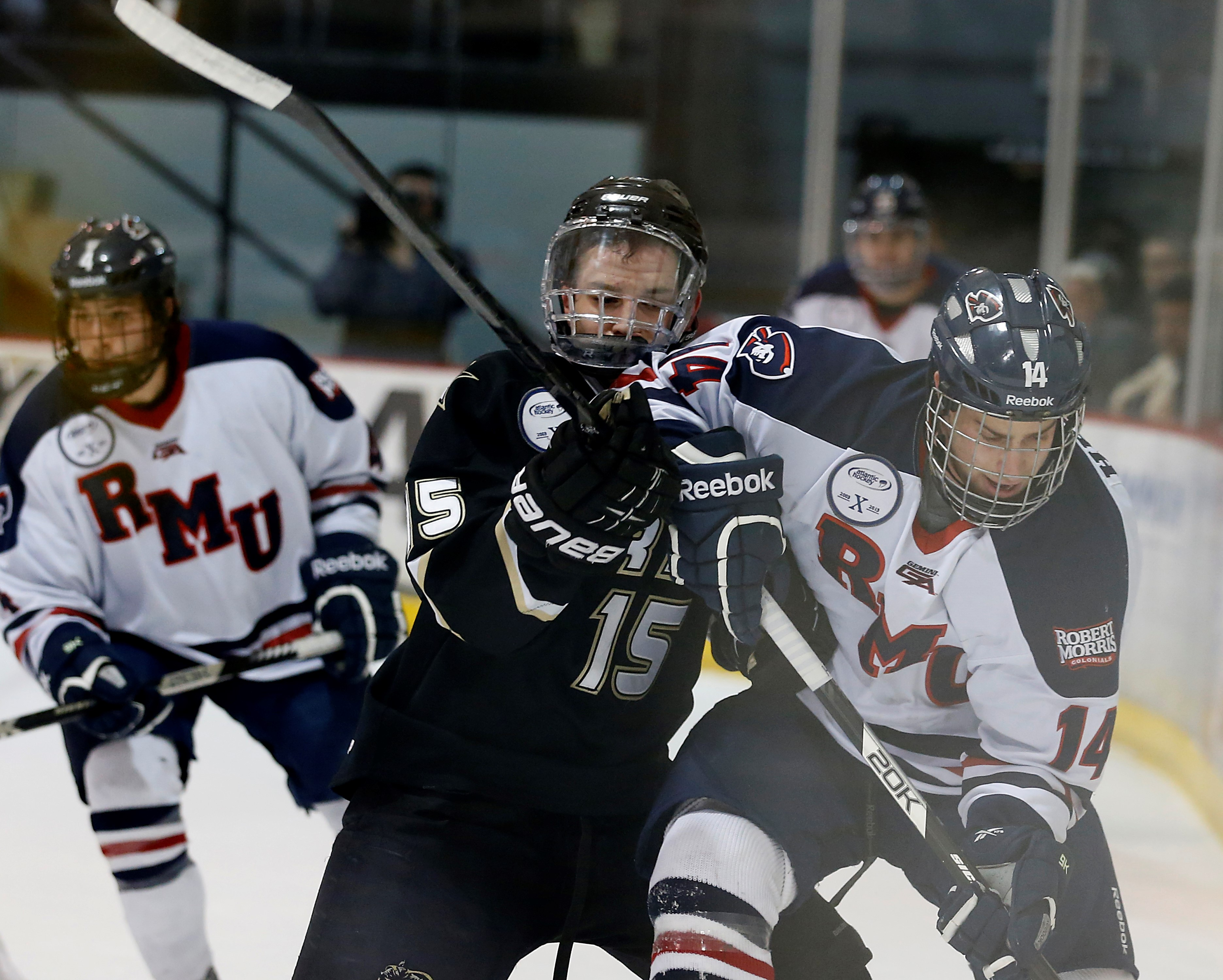
A game between Robert Morris and Army in 2013

On May 26, 2021, Robert Morris University announced it would be cutting the men's and women's ice hockey programs. On December 17, 2021, it was announced the program would be reinstated for the 2023–24 season.

== Season-by-season results ==
Source:

== Records vs. current Atlantic Hockey America teams ==
As of the completion of 2018–19 season

School	Team	Away Arena	Overall record	Win %	Last Result
Air Force Academy	Falcons	Cadet Ice Arena	15–20–3	.434	1-3 L
American International College	Yellow Jackets	MassMutual Center	20–7–3	.717	2-3 L (OT)
Army West Point	Black Knights	Tate Rink	12–7–5	.604	2-5 L
Bentley University	Falcons	Bentley Arena	15–16–4	.486	3-2 W (OT)
Canisius College	Golden Griffins	LECOM Harborcenter	18–10–3	.629	4-6 L
College of the Holy Cross	Crusaders	Hart Center	17–7–2	.692	3-2 W
Mercyhurst University	Lakers	Mercyhurst Ice Center	14–12–8	.529	4-3 W
Niagara University	Purple Eagles	Dwyer Arena	24–31–10	.446	2-4 L
Rochester Institute of Technology	Tigers	Gene Polisseni Center	13–15–5	.470	2-2 T
Sacred Heart University	Pioneers	Webster Bank Arena	23–3–1	.870	1-3 L

== Head coaches ==
As of the completion of 2025–26 season

Tenure	Coach	Years	Record	Pct.
2004–Present	Derek Schooley	20	312–341–79	.480
Totals	1 coach	20 seasons	312–341–79	.480

== Players ==
=== Current roster ===
As of August 3, 2025.

No.	Nat.	Player	Class	Pos	Height	Weight	DoB	Hometown	Previous team	NHL rights
1	(United States)	Croix Kochendorfer	Sophomore	G	6' 4" (1.93 m)	223 lb (101 kg)	2003-10-13	Saint Paul, Minnesota	Aberdeen Wings (NAHL)	—
2	(Canada)	Michael Craig	Junior	D	5' 10" (1.78 m)	174 lb (79 kg)	2002-08-26	St. Catharines, Ontario	Nanaimo Clippers (BCHL)	—
3	(United States)	Dominic Elliott	Sophomore	D	5' 10" (1.78 m)	176 lb (80 kg)	2004-01-26	Allendale, Michigan	Oklahoma Warriors (NAHL)	—
4	(United States)	Greg Japchen	Senior	D	6' 4" (1.93 m)	205 lb (93 kg)	2001-12-17	Doylestown, Pennsylvania	Stonehill (ECAC)	—
5	(United States)	Luke van Why	Junior	D	5' 10" (1.78 m)	163 lb (74 kg)	2003-01-21	Hatfield, Pennsylvania	Maryland Black Bears (NAHL)	—
6	(Sweden)	Rasmus Larsson	Sophomore	D	6' 3" (1.91 m)	203 lb (92 kg)	2004-02-09	Hässelby, Sweden	Northern Michigan (CCHA)	NYR, 152nd overall 2023
7	(Canada)	John Babcock	Freshman	D	6' 2" (1.88 m)	205 lb (93 kg)	2004-04-25	North Vancouver, British Columbia	Regina Pats (WHL)	—
8	(United States)	Gabriel Lunn	Junior	D	6' 0" (1.83 m)	190 lb (86 kg)	2003-08-25	Lockport, New York	Johnstown Tomahawks (NAHL)	—
7	(Sweden)	Max Wattvil	Junior	D	6' 2" (1.88 m)	192 lb (87 kg)	2002-08-11	Stockholm, Sweden	Merrimack (HEA)	—
10	(Canada)	J. R. Ashmead	Sophomore	D	6' 2" (1.88 m)	181 lb (82 kg)	2003-03-23	Calgary, Alberta	Bonnyville Pontiacs (AJHL)	—
11	(Canada)	Dario Beljo	Junior	F	6' 3" (1.91 m)	190 lb (86 kg)	2002-08-15	Greater Sudbury, Ontario	American International (AHA)	—
12	(United States)	Jackson Reineke	Junior	F	5' 10" (1.78 m)	174 lb (79 kg)	2002-10-03	Faribault, Minnesota	Anchorage Wolverines (USHL)	—
14	(United States)	Julian Beaumont	Freshman	F	5' 8" (1.73 m)	161 lb (73 kg)	2004-02-23	Allen, Texas	Bismarck Bobcats (NAHL)	—
15	(United States)	Connor Gourley	Sophomore	F	6' 2" (1.88 m)	170 lb (77 kg)	2004-07-28	Calgary, Alberta	Okotoks Oilers (BCHL)	—
16	(Canada)	George Krotiris	Junior	F	5' 11" (1.8 m)	165 lb (75 kg)	2002-08-08	Markham, Ontario	Cobourg Cougars (OJHL)	—
17	(United States)	Patrick Johnson	Sophomore	F	5' 8" (1.73 m)	187 lb (85 kg)	2003-06-30	Chesterfield, Missouri	Bismarck Bobcats (NAHL)	—
18	(Canada)	Bruce McDonald	Freshman	F	6' 0" (1.83 m)	176 lb (80 kg)	2004-12-18	Ottawa, Ontario	Owen Sound Attack (OHL)	—
19	(Canada)	Tanner Klimpke	Junior	F	6' 2" (1.88 m)	174 lb (79 kg)	2002-12-13	Calgary, Alberta	Whitecourt Wolverines (AJHL)	—
20	(Canada)	McKay Hayes	Junior	F	6' 2" (1.88 m)	205 lb (93 kg)	2002-01-27	Ancaster, Ontario	Markham Royals (OJHL)	—
21	(Canada)	Cameron Garvey	Junior	F	6' 0" (1.83 m)	181 lb (82 kg)	2002-12-13	Oakville, Ontario	Collingwood Blues (OJHL)	—
22	(United States)	Ryan Taylor	Senior	F	6' 3" (1.91 m)	210 lb (95 kg)	2001-03-19	St. Peters, Missouri	Clarkson (ECAC)	—
23	(Canada)	Zeke Nicholson	Freshman	F	6' 0" (1.83 m)	181 lb (82 kg)	2004-04-09	Vancouver, British Columbia	Alberni Valley Bulldogs (BCHL)	—
26	(United States)	Braden Rourke	Sophomore	F	6' 0" (1.83 m)	172 lb (78 kg)	2004-07-20	Des Moines, Iowa	Des Moines Buccaneers (USHL)	—
27	(Canada)	Trent Wilson	Sophomore	F	6' 1" (1.85 m)	187 lb (85 kg)	2004-06-24	Tsawwassen, British Columbia	West Kelowna Warriors (BCHL)	—
29	(United States)	Michael Felsing	Sophomore	F	5' 11" (1.8 m)	181 lb (82 kg)	2003-02-11	Pittsburgh, Pennsylvania	Merritt Centennials (BCHL)	—
30	(United States)	Lucas Massie	Sophomore	G	6' 1" (1.85 m)	190 lb (86 kg)	2003-04-11	Claremont, California	Union (ECAC)	—
31	(Canada)	Charlie Schenkel	Freshman	G	6' 5" (1.96 m)	205 lb (93 kg)	2004-08-16	Toronto, Ontario	Kingston Frontenacs (OHL)	—
33	(Canada)	Lee Chiang	Junior	F	5' 9" (1.75 m)	170 lb (77 kg)	2002-12-07	Toronto, Ontario	Markham Royals (OJHL)	—
44	(Canada)	Luca Primerano	Freshman	F	6' 2" (1.88 m)	190 lb (86 kg)	2005-03-17	North Vancouver, British Columbia	Cowichan Valley Capitals (BCHL)	—

== Statistical leaders ==
=== Career points leaders ===
Player	Years	GP	G	A	Pts	PIM
Brady Ferguson	2014–2018	152	66	110	167	
Zac Lynch	2012–2016	152	67	89	156	
Cody Wydo	2011–2015	151	85	65	150	
Alex Tonge	2015–2019	146	56	82	138	
Nathan Longpre	2007–2011	121	47	91	138	
Chris Margott	2005–2009	132	64	72	136	
Greg Gibson	2012–2016	150	66	51	117	
Denny Urban	2007–2011	136	28	84	112	
Daniel Leavens	2013–2017	136	40	68	108	
Scott Jacklin	2012–2016	143	48	59	107	

=== Career goaltending leaders ===
GP = Games played; Min = Minutes played; W = Wins; L = Losses; T = Ties; GA = Goals against; SO = Shutouts; SV% = Save percentage; GAA = Goals against average

Minimum 30 games

Player	Years	GP	Min	W	L	T	GA	SO	SV%	GAA
Frank Marotte	2016–2019	107	5938	50	44	8	252	8	.917	2.55
Terry Shafer	2012–2016	86	4808	43	30	11	214	8	.920	2.67
Eric Levine	2009–2013	72	3953	30	22	11	177	5	.925	2.69
Justin Kapelmaster	2016–2020	78	4267	29	37	7	193	6	.921	2.71
Brooks Ostergard	2008–2012	103	5516	39	41	12	251	3	.917	2.73

Statistics current through the start of the 2019–20 season.

== Awards and honors ==
=== CHA ===
==== Individual awards ====
Player of the Year

- Ryan Cruthers: 2008

Student-Athlete of the Year

- Joel Gasper: 2008

==== All-Conference teams ====
First Team All-CHA

- 2007–08: Ryan Cruthers, F
- 2008–09: Denny Urban, D; Chris Margott, F; Nathan Longpre, F
- 2009–10: Denny Urban, D; Nathan Longpre, F

Second Team All-CHA

- 2006–07: Aaron Clarke, F
- 2007–08: Chris Margott, F
- 2009–10: Dave Cowan, D; Chris Kushneriuk, F

All-CHA Rookie Team

- 2004–05: Chris Kaufman, D; Jace Buzek, F
- 2005–06: Chris Margott, F
- 2007–08: Denny Urban, D; Nathan Longpre, F
- 2008–09: Brooks Ostergard, G; James Lyle, D
- 2009–10: Stefan Salituro, F

=== Atlantic Hockey Association ===
==== Individual awards ====
Player of the Year

- Zac Lynch: 2015
- Nick Prkusic: 2021

Rookie of the Year

- Randy Hernández: 2021

Best Defensive Forward

- Nick Chiavetta: 2012

Best Defenseman

- Denny Urban: 2011
- Nick Jenny: 2021

Individual Sportsmanship Award

- Furman South: 2011
- Nick Jenny: 2021

Regular season Scoring Trophy

- Zac Lynch: 2016
- Brady Ferguson: 2017

Coach of the Year

- Derek Schooley: 2015, 2021

Most Valuable Player in tournament

- Cody Wydo: 2014

==== All-Conference teams ====
First Team All-Atlantic Hockey

- 2010–11: Denny Urban, D; Nathan Longpre, F
- 2013–14: Cody Wydo, F
- 2014–15: Cody Wydo, F
- 2015–16: Greg Gibson, F; Zac Lynch, F
- 2016–17: Brady Ferguson, F
- 2017–18: Brady Ferguson, F
- 2020–21: Nick Jenny, D; Nick Prkusic, F

Second Team All-Atlantic Hockey

- 2012–13: Adam Brace, F
- 2015–16: Tyson Wilson, D
- 2018–19: Alex Tonge, F
- 2019–20: Justin Kapelmaster, G
- 2020–21: Noah West, G; Brendan Michaelian, D; Randy Hernández, F

Third Team All-Atlantic Hockey

- 2010–11: Brooks Ostergard, G
- 2011–12: Cody Crichton, F
- 2013–14: Terry Shafer, G
- 2014–15: Dalton Izyk, G; Chase Golightly, D; Zac Lynch, F
- 2015–16: Terry Shafer, G; Chase Golightly, D; Brandon Denham, F
- 2016–17: Eric Israel, D; Daniel Leavens, F
- 2017–18: Alex Tonge, F
- 2018–19: Frank Marotte, G

Atlantic Hockey All-Rookie Team

- 2011–12: Tyson Wilson, D
- 2014–15: Brady Ferguson, F
- 2016–17: Frank Marotte, G
- 2020–21: Noah West, G; Brian Kramer, D; Randy Hernández, F

=== Atlantic Hockey America ===
==== All-Conference teams ====
Second Team All-Atlantic Hockey America

- 2025–26: Dominic Elliott, D; Tanner Klimpke, F

All-Atlantic Hockey America Rookie Team

- 2024–25: Dominic Elliott, D
- 2025–26: John Babcock, D

== Robert Morris Colonials Hall of Fame ==
The following is a list of people associated with the men's ice hockey program who were elected into the Robert Morris Colonials Hall of Fame (induction date in parentheses).

- Nathan Longpre (2017)
- Chris Margott (2015)
- Denny Urban (2018)

== Olympians ==
This is a list of Robert Morris alumni were a part of an Olympic team.

Name	Position	Robert Morris Tenure	Team	Year	Finish
Daniel Mantenuto	Forward	2016–2020	(Italy) ITA	2026	12th
Justin Addamo	Forward	2018–2021	(France) FRA	2026	11th

== Colonials in the NHL ==
Source: Robert Morris has yet to have an alumnus reach the NHL.

== See also ==
- Robert Morris Colonials women's ice hockey
