= 2023–24 Army Black Knights men's ice hockey season =

- Conference: 10th Atlantic Hockey
- Home ice: Tate Rink

Rankings
- USCHO: NR
- USA Hockey: NR

Record
- Overall: 10–23–2
- Conference: 8–16–2
- Home: 5–10–1
- Road: 5–13–1

Coaches and captains
- Head coach: Brian Riley
- Assistant coaches: Zach McKelvie; Chris Azzano; Jack Riley
- Captain(s): Ricky Lyle; Michael Sacco

The 2023–24 Army Black Knights men's ice hockey season was the 121st season of play for the program, the 114th at the Division I level, and the 21st in Atlantic Hockey. The Black Knights represented the United States Military Academy, played their home games at the Tate Rink and were coached by Brian Riley in his 20th season.

== Season ==
Army started their season by losing their first nine games and allowing at least 3 goals in every game. The Black Knights' offensive side could to overcome the below-average performance they were seeing in net. Neither Gavin Abrin nor Evan Szary showed any signs of being able to keep the puck out of the net and the losses mounted.

Just before Thanksgiving, Szary provided the first decent game in goal, enabling Army to win its first game of the year. Afterwards, the goaltending remained inconsistent for the rest of the season, alternating between decent outings and subpar performances. By season's end the Black Knights had the 3rd-worst goals against average in the nation, surrendering almost 4 goals per game. The team's offense remained consistently average all season long, capitalizing in the matches where the goaltending was at least respectable. In games where Army allowed three goals or fewer, the Black Knights went 10–2–2, on matches where they allowed at least four goals, the team went 0–20–0.

The defensive troubles resulted in the team finishing 10th in the conference and having to face Niagara in the First Round of the Atlantic Hockey tournament. The Black Knights fired 43 shots on goal, nearly double the total from the Purple Eagles, but they were let down by goaltending once more. Abric allowed 3 goals on just 20 shots while Army was stymied time and again by Niagara's netminder. The 1–4 loss followed the pattern that had been laid out all season long and ended a rather forgettable year for Army.

== Departures ==
Player	Position	Nationality	Cause
Brett Abdelnour	Forward	United States	Graduation (retired)
Jude Brower	Defenseman	United States	Left program (retired)
Justin Evenson	Goaltender	United States	Graduation (retired)
Reese Farrell	Forward	United States	Left program (retired)
Thomas Farrell	Defenseman	United States	Graduation (signed with Toledo Walleye)
Anthony Firriolo	Defenseman	United States	Graduation (signed with Jacksonville Icemen)
Kendrick Frost	Forward	United States	Graduation (retired)
John Keranen	Forward	United States	Graduation (retired)
Patrick Smyth	Forward	United States	Graduation (retired)
Noah Wilson	Defenseman	United States	Graduation (retired)

== Recruiting ==
Player	Position	Nationality	Age	Notes
Jon Bell	Defenseman	United States	21	St. Cloud, MN
Mac Gadowsky	Defenseman	United States	21	Fairbanks, AK
Jacob Hewitt	Forward	United States	21	Ashburnham, MA
Gus Holt	Forward	United States	20	Bowling Green, OH
Nik Hong	Forward	United States	21	Minneapolis, MN
Dayne Hoyord	Forward	United States	21	Scandinavia, WI
Brent Keefer	Forward	United States	22	Colorado Springs, CO
Pierce Patterson	Defenseman	United States	21	Valrico, FL
Vincent Salice	Forward	United States	20	Commerce Township, MI
Barron Woodring	Forward	United States	21	Chicago, IL
Easton Zueger	Defenseman	United States	20	Sioux Falls, SD

== Roster ==
As of September 14, 2023.

No.	Nat.	Player	Class	Pos	Height	Weight	DoB	Hometown	Previous team	NHL rights
1	(United States)	Gavin Abric	Senior	G	6' 3" (1.91 m)	185 lb (84 kg)	2001-01-11	Hayward, Wisconsin	Jersey Hitmen (NCDC)	—
2	(United States)	Mac Gadowsky	Freshman	D	6' 3" (1.91 m)	185 lb (84 kg)	2002-01-10	Fairbanks, Alaska	Fairbanks Ice Dogs (NAHL)	—
3	(United States)	Easton Zueger	Freshman	D	5' 8" (1.73 m)	190 lb (86 kg)	2003-06-07	Sioux Falls, South Dakota	Sioux City Musketeers (USHL)	—
4	(United States)	John Driscoll	Sophomore	D	6' 4" (1.93 m)	205 lb (93 kg)	2001-08-19	Littleton, Colorado	Green Bay Gamblers (USHL)	—
5	(United States)	Jon Bell	Freshman	D	5' 10" (1.78 m)	205 lb (93 kg)	2002-06-22	St. Cloud, Minnesota	Wisconsin Windigo (NAHL)	—
6	(United States)	Pierce Patterson	Freshman	D	5' 9" (1.75 m)	165 lb (75 kg)	2002-02-26	Valrico, Florida	Amarillo Wranglers (NAHL)	—
7	(United States)	Andrew Gilbert	Junior	D	6' 5" (1.96 m)	210 lb (95 kg)	2000-05-02	Fairfield, Connecticut	Jersey Hitmen (NCDC)	—
8	(United States)	Ricky Lyle (C)	Senior	F	6' 1" (1.85 m)	190 lb (86 kg)	2000-08-21	Duluth, Minnesota	Madison Capitols (USHL)	—
9	(United States)	Nik Hong	Freshman	F	5' 11" (1.8 m)	185 lb (84 kg)	2002-08-27	Minneapolis, Minnesota	St. Cloud Norsemen (NAHL)	—
10	(United States)	Jake Felker	Senior	F	5' 11" (1.8 m)	190 lb (86 kg)	2000-03-19	Omaha, Nebraska	Youngstown Phantoms (USHL)	—
11	(United States)	Josh Bohlin	Junior	F	6' 1" (1.85 m)	190 lb (86 kg)	2000-02-10	Wausau, Wisconsin	Minnesota Wilderness (NAHL)	—
12	(United States)	Jake Hewitt	Freshman	F	5' 10" (1.78 m)	180 lb (82 kg)	2002-07-05	Ashburnham, Massachusetts	Nanaimo (BCHL)	—
13	(United States)	Michael Sacco (C)	Junior	F	5' 8" (1.73 m)	175 lb (79 kg)	1999-11-16	Syosset, New York	Wilkes-Barre/Scranton Knights (NAHL)	—
14	(United States)	Owen Nolan	Sophomore	D	6' 0" (1.83 m)	185 lb (84 kg)	2000-03-10	Mahopac, New York	Lone Star Brahmas (NAHL)	—
15	(United States)	Lucas Kanta	Sophomore	F	6' 2" (1.88 m)	195 lb (88 kg)	2001-04-20	Grand Forks, North Dakota	Minnesota Magicians (NAHL)	—
16	(United States)	Hunter McCoy	Junior	F	6' 0" (1.83 m)	195 lb (88 kg)	2000-08-01	Newburyport, Massachusetts	Maryland Black Bears (NAHL)	—
17	(United States)	Vincent Salice	Freshman	F	5' 7" (1.7 m)	175 lb (79 kg)	2003-02-28	Commerce Township, Michigan	Omaha Lancers (USHL)	—
18	(United States)	Dayne Hoyord	Freshman	F	5' 10" (1.78 m)	185 lb (84 kg)	2002-03-19	Scandinavia, Wisconsin	Odessa Jackalopes (NAHL)	—
19	(United States)	Max Itagaki	Sophomore	F	5' 5" (1.65 m)	155 lb (70 kg)	2002-06-18	Glenview, Illinois	Nanaimo Clippers (BCHL)	—
20	(United States)	Sean Vlasich	Sophomore	D	5' 9" (1.75 m)	175 lb (79 kg)	2001-04-20	Hillsdale, New Jersey	North Iowa Bulls (NAHL)	—
21	(United States)	Stephen Willey	Sophomore	F	6' 1" (1.85 m)	195 lb (88 kg)	2001-03-26	Shelton, Connecticut	New Jersey Titans (NAHL)	—
22	(United States)	Jude Brower	Sophomore	D	6' 1" (1.85 m)	180 lb (82 kg)	2001-06-11	Mahopac, New York	Boston Junior Bruins (NCDC)	—
23	(United States)	Joey Baez	Junior	F	5' 9" (1.75 m)	175 lb (79 kg)	2000-01-12	Tampa, Florida	Lone Star Brahmas (NAHL)	—
24	(United States)	Andrew Garby	Junior	D	5' 9" (1.75 m)	160 lb (73 kg)	2000-09-17	Canton, Michigan	Fairbanks Ice Dogs (NAHL)	—
25	(United States)	Barron Woodring	Freshman	F	6' 2" (1.88 m)	200 lb (91 kg)	2002-07-05	Chicago, Illinois	Rockets Hockey Club (NCDC)	—
26	(United States)	Joey Dosan	Sophomore	F	6' 6" (1.98 m)	220 lb (100 kg)	2001-03-20	Bloomington, Minnesota	Springfield Jr. Blues (NAHL)	—
27	(United States)	Trevor Smith	Sophomore	F	5' 9" (1.75 m)	185 lb (84 kg)	2001-03-02	Raleigh, North Carolina	Boston Advantage (NCDC)	—
28	(United States)	Brent Keefer	Freshman	F	6' 0" (1.83 m)	170 lb (77 kg)	2001-09-28	Colorado Springs, Colorado	Northeast Generals (NAHL)	—
29	(United States)	Eric Huss	Senior	F	5' 10" (1.78 m)	175 lb (79 kg)	1999-03-16	Dallas, Texas	Lone Star Brahmas (NAHL)	—
31	(United States)	Evan Szary	Junior	G	5' 11" (1.8 m)	175 lb (79 kg)	2000-02-29	Nashville, Tennessee	South Shore Kings (NCDC)	—
33	(United States)	Gus Holt	Freshman	G	6' 3" (1.91 m)	206 lb (93 kg)	2003-02-21	Bowling Green, Ohio	Victoria Grizzlies (BCHL)	—

== Standings ==
2023–24 Atlantic Hockey Standings
	Conference record										Overall record					
	GP	W	L	T	OW	OL	SW	PTS	GF	GA	GP	W	L	T	GF	GA
#17 RIT †*	26	18	7	1	3	2	0	54	102	64	40	27	11	2	156	96
Holy Cross	26	13	10	3	0	3	1	46	78	62	39	21	14	4	116	93
Sacred Heart	26	14	10	2	2	2	1	45	75	70	36	14	19	3	91	113
Air Force	26	15	10	1	3	0	1	44	88	75	38	18	19	1	115	119
American International	26	12	10	4	1	1	2	42	79	68	40	20	16	4	119	111
Bentley	26	12	12	2	1	2	2	41	69	58	35	16	17	2	95	82
Niagara	26	13	10	3	3	1	1	41	78	79	39	18	18	3	111	122
Canisius	26	10	12	4	2	1	0	33	73	87	37	12	21	4	103	126
Mercyhurst	26	7	15	4	0	1	4	30	77	91	35	9	22	4	98	126
Army	26	8	16	2	0	1	1	28	66	96	35	10	23	2	93	139
Robert Morris	26	7	17	2	0	1	1	25	60	95	39	11	25	3	94	142
Championship: March 23, 2024 † indicates conference regular season champion (DeGregorio Trophy) * indicates conference tournament champion (Riley Trophy); Rankings: USCHO.com Top 20 Poll

== Schedule and results ==
Date	Time	Opponent^{#}	Rank^{#}	Site	TV	Decision	Result	Attendance	Record
Regular Season
October 8	2:00 pm	Union*		Tate Rink • West Point, New York	FloHockey	Abric	L 0–6	2,033	0–1–0
Ice Breaker Tournament
October 13	8:00 pm	at #7 North Dakota*		Ralph Engelstad Arena • Grand Forks, North Dakota (Ice Breaker Game 1)	Midco	Abric	L 2–7	11,548	0–2–0
October 14	7:07 pm	at Bemidji State*		Sanford Center • Bemidji, Minnesota (Ice Breaker Game 2)		Szary	L 2–3 ^{OT}	1,986	0–3–0
October 31	7:05 pm	at Sacred Heart		Martire Family Arena • Fairfield, Connecticut	FloHockey, SNY	Abric	L 1–6	2,127	0–4–0 (0–1–0)
November 3	7:00 pm	RIT		Tate Rink • West Point, New York	FloHockey	Abric	L 2–4	1,795	0–5–0 (0–2–0)
November 4	4:00 pm	RIT		Tate Rink • West Point, New York	FloHockey	Szary	L 3–5	1,638	0–6–0 (0–3–0)
November 10	9:05 pm	at Air Force		Cadet Ice Arena • Colorado Springs, Colorado (Rivalry)	FloHockey	Szary	L 3–4 ^{OT}	2,629	0–7–0 (0–4–0)
November 11	7:05 pm	at Air Force		Cadet Ice Arena • Colorado Springs, Colorado (Rivalry)	FloHockey	Szary	L 0–4	2,250	0–8–0 (0–5–0)
November 17	7:00 pm	Canisius		Tate Rink • West Point, New York	FloHockey	Abric	L 4–6	1,600	0–9–0 (0–6–0)
November 18	7:00 pm	Canisius		Tate Rink • West Point, New York	FloHockey	Szary	W 2–1	1,670	1–9–0 (1–6–0)
November 21	7:00 pm	at Holy Cross		Hart Center • Worcester, Massachusetts	FloHockey	Szary	W 3–2	807	2–9–0 (2–6–0)
Turkey Leg Classic
November 24	4:00 pm	at Merrimack*		J. Thom Lawler Rink • North Andover, Massachusetts (Turkey Leg Game 1)	ESPN+	Szary	L 3–7	2,034	2–10–0
November 25	4:00 pm	at Massachusetts Lowell*		Tsongas Center • Lowell, Massachusetts (Turkey Leg Game 2)	ESPN+	Szary	W 4–2	3,741	3–10–0
November 28	7:05 pm	at American International		MassMutual Center • Springfield, Massachusetts	FloHockey	Szary	L 1–5	252	3–11–0 (2–7–0)
December 8	7:00 pm	at Mercyhurst		Mercyhurst Ice Center • Erie, Pennsylvania	FloHockey	Szary	W 4–3	1,017	4–11–0 (3–7–0)
December 9	4:00 pm	at Mercyhurst		Mercyhurst Ice Center • Erie, Pennsylvania	FloHockey	Abric	L 3–4	1,005	4–12–0 (3–8–0)
December 29	7:00 pm	#16 New Hampshire*		Tate Rink • West Point, New York	FloHockey	Abric	W 6–3	2,610	5–12–0
January 2	7:00 pm	Bentley		Tate Rink • West Point, New York	FloHockey	Abric	L 2–5	1,533	5–13–0 (3–9–0)
January 6	6:00 pm	at #19 Penn State*		Pegula Ice Arena • University Park, Pennsylvania		Abric	L 6–7	6,078	5–14–0
January 9	7:00 pm	at Sacred Heart		Martire Family Arena • Fairfield, Connecticut	FloHockey	Abric	T 3–3 ^{SOL}	2,634	5–14–1 (3–9–1)
January 12	7:00 pm	Holy Cross		Tate Rink • West Point, New York	FloHockey	Szary	W 3–0	1,625	6–14–1 (4–9–1)
January 13	4:00 pm	Holy Cross		Tate Rink • West Point, New York	FloHockey	Szary	L 1–3	2,269	6–15–1 (4–10–1)
January 16	7:00 pm	Sacred Heart		Tate Rink • West Point, New York	FloHockey	Szary	W 5–3	800	7–15–1 (5–10–1)
January 19	7:00 pm	Air Force		Tate Rink • West Point, New York (Rivalry)	FloHockey	Szary	L 1–8	2,528	7–16–1 (5–11–1)
January 20	4:00 pm	Air Force		Tate Rink • West Point, New York (Rivalry)	FloHockey	Abric	L 6–7	2,548	7–17–1 (5–12–1)
January 27	7:00 pm	Royal Military College*		Tate Rink • West Point, New York (Rivalry, Exhibition)	FloHockey	Abric	W 6–1	2,365	
January 30	7:00 pm	at Princeton*		Hobey Baker Memorial Rink • Princeton, New Jersey	ESPN+	Abric	L 3–4 ^{OT}	1,281	7–18–1
February 2	7:00 pm	at Bentley		Bentley Arena • Waltham, Massachusetts	FloHockey	Szary	L 2–4	1,630	7–19–1 (5–13–1)
February 3	4:00 pm	at Bentley		Bentley Arena • Waltham, Massachusetts	FloHockey	Szary	W 2–1	1,515	8–19–1 (6–13–1)
February 9	7:00 pm	Robert Morris		Tate Rink • West Point, New York	FloHockey	Szary	W 3–1	1,708	9–19–1 (7–13–1)
February 10	6:00 pm	Robert Morris		Tate Rink • West Point, New York	FloHockey	Szary	L 3–4	1,734	9–20–1 (7–14–1)
February 16	7:00 pm	at Niagara		Dwyer Arena • Lewiston, New York	FloHockey	Abric	L 3–6	1,002	9–21–1 (7–15–1)
February 17	5:00 pm	at Niagara		Dwyer Arena • Lewiston, New York	FloHockey	Abric	W 3–0	1,004	10–21–1 (8–15–1)
February 23	7:00 pm	American International		Tate Rink • West Point, New York	FloHockey	Abric	T 2–2 ^{SOW}	2,065	10–21–2 (8–15–2)
February 24	4:00 pm	American International		Tate Rink • West Point, New York	FloHockey	Abric	L 1–5	2,019	10–22–2 (8–16–2)
Atlantic Hockey Tournament
March 2	7:00 pm	at Niagara*		Dwyer Arena • Lewiston, New York (First Round)	FloHockey	Abric	L 1–4	710	10–23–2
*Non-conference game. ^{#}Rankings from USCHO.com Poll. All times are in Eastern Time. Source:

== Scoring statistics ==
Name	Position	Games	Goals	Assists	Points	PIM
Joey Baez	F	32	15	16	31	14
Max Itagaki	F	34	6	19	25	31
Brent Keefer	F	34	13	11	24	30
Mac Gadowsky	D	28	4	19	23	8
Michael Sacco	F	34	6	16	22	54
John Driscoll	D	35	5	16	21	16
Ricky Lyle	LW	34	10	9	19	33
Nik Hong	F	35	7	10	17	14
Jake Hewitt	F	35	7	10	17	6
Vincent Salice	F	34	4	6	10	12
Pierce Patterson	D	31	4	6	10	8
Barron Woodring	F	31	5	3	8	16
Hunter McCoy	F	25	1	4	5	8
Jude Brower	D	15	0	4	4	7
Sean Vlasich	D	28	0	3	3	6
Owen Nolan	D	21	0	3	3	16
Easton Zueger	D	21	1	2	3	4
Lucas Kanta	F	28	1	2	3	8
Stephen Willey	F	20	1	1	2	0
Andrew Garby	D	10	2	0	2	2
Trevor Smith	F	12	1	1	2	2
Eric Huss	F	15	0	1	1	4
Evan Szary	G	26	0	1	1	0
Josh Bohlin	F	1	0	0	0	2
Andrew Gilbert	D	33	0	0	0	10
Joey Dosan	F	2	0	0	0	0
Jake Felker	F	14	0	0	0	19
Gavin Abric	G	19	0	0	0	0
Jon Bell	D	18	0	0	0	15
Total			93	163	256	345

== Goaltending statistics ==
Name	Games	Minutes	Wins	Losses	Ties	Goals against	Saves	Shut outs	SV %	GAA
Evan Szary	26	1233:12	8	10	0	67	593	1	.898	3.26
Gavin Abric	19	864:42	2	13	2	65	413	1	.864	4.51
Empty Net	-	22:20	-	-	-	7	-	-	-	-
Total	35	2120:14	10	23	2	139	1006	2	.879	3.93

== Rankings ==
Poll	Week																										
Poll	Pre	1	2	3	4	5	6	7	8	9	10	11	12	13	14	15	16	17	18	19	20	21	22	23	24	25	26 (Final)
USCHO.com	NR	NR	NR	NR	NR	NR	NR	NR	NR	NR	NR	–	NR	NR	NR	NR	NR	NR	NR	NR	NR	NR	NR	NR	NR	–	NR
USA Hockey	NR	NR	NR	NR	NR	NR	NR	NR	NR	NR	NR	NR	–	NR	NR	NR	NR	NR	NR	NR	NR	NR	NR	NR	NR	NR	NR

Note: USCHO did not release a poll in weeks 11 and 25.
Note: USA Hockey did not release a poll in week 12.

== Awards and honors ==
Player	Award	Ref
Joey Baez	Atlantic Hockey Second Team	
Mac Gadowsky	Atlantic Hockey Rookie Team	
