= 2023–24 Air Force Falcons men's ice hockey season =

- Conference: 4th Atlantic Hockey
- Home ice: Cadet Ice Arena

Rankings
- USCHO: NR
- USA Hockey: NR

Record
- Overall: 18–19–1
- Conference: 15–10–1
- Home: 10–11–0
- Road: 8–8–1
- Neutral: 0–2–0

Coaches and captains
- Head coach: Frank Serratore
- Assistant coaches: Andy Berg; Joe Doyle; Steve Jennings
- Captain: Luke Robinson

The 2023–24 Air Force Falcons men's ice hockey season was the 56th season of play for the program and the 18th in Atlantic Hockey. The Falcons represented the United States Air Force Academy, played their home games at the Cadet Ice Arena and were coached by Frank Serratore in his 27th season.

== Season ==
Just before the start of the season, the NCAA announced:

"The school, enforcement staff, men's ice hockey head coach and two assistant coaches agreed that ... two assistant coaches had approximately 18 impermissible recruiting contacts with a prospective student-athlete and his father before that student-athlete had entered the Transfer Portal"

Though he was not charged with any direct action, head coach Frank Serratore was responsible for the actions of his assistants. As such, a standard Level II penalty was applied to both Serratore and the two assistants who were unnamed in the release.

Once the season got underway, the Falcons very quickly proved to be an inconsistent team. After splitting their opening series against Lindenwood, one of the worst teams in the nation, Air Force followed that up with a split versus Michigan State, one of the best teams. That trend continued throughout the season and can mostly be attributed to the defensive side of the puck. Air Force had a very good season offensively, averaging 3 goals per game for the year. However, they allowed slightly more goals per game on average and were let down by a subpar season from Guy Blessing.

Despite the deficiencies, the team finished 4th in Atlantic Hockey and earned a home stand for the conference quarterfinals. The Falcons outplayed American International in the first game, firing 32 shots to the Yellow Jackets' 18 but they were unable to overcome a strong goaltending performance from the opposing netminder. The second game saw Air Force jump out to a 2–0 lead in the first period but the team was unable to build on that lead for the rest of the match. AIC tied the game with less than two minutes to play and forced overtime. USAF ratcheted up their offense in the extra session, sending 15 shots on goal in just over 12 minutes but none of them could find the back of the net. A simple rush up the ice ended the game in the middle of the first overtime when a perfectly placed shot ricocheted in off of the crossbar and ended the Falcons' season.

== Departures ==
Player	Position	Nationality	Cause
Blake Bride	Forward	United States	Graduation (retired)
Brandon Koch	Defenseman	United States	Graduate transfer to Minnesota State
Andrew Kruse	Defenseman	United States	Graduation (retired)
Bennett Norlin	Forward	United States	Graduation (retired)
Brett Oberle	Defenseman	United States	Joined club team
Austin Park	Goaltender	United States	Graduation (retired)
Ray Picard	Goaltender	United States	Rejoined club team
Ty Pochipinski	Forward	United States	Graduation (retired)
Aaron Randazzo	Goaltender	United States	Left program (retired)
Willie Reim	Forward	United States	Graduation (retired)
Drake Usher	Defenseman	United States	Left program (retired)
Dalton Weigel	Defenseman	United States	Graduation (retired)

== Recruiting ==
Player	Position	Nationality	Age	Notes
Owen Baumgartner	Defenseman	United States	21	Owatonna, MN
James Callahan	Defenseman	United States	20	Minneapolis, MN
Carter Clafton	Goaltender	United States	21	Grand Rapids, MN
Nolan Cunningham	Defenseman	United States	21	Great Falls, MT
Owen DuBois	Forward	United States	21	Madison, WI
Brendan Gibbons	Forward	United States	21	South Kingstown, RI
Sam Jacobs	Forward	United States	21	Plymouth, MN
Nick Remissong	Forward	United States	21	Lake Forest, IL
Will Staring	Defenseman	United States	20	Springfield, VA
Ethan Ullrick	Forward	United States	20	Lakewood, IL
Dominik Wasik	Goaltender	United States	21	Superior, CO

== Roster ==
As of September 14, 2023

No.	Nat.	Player	Class	Pos	Height	Weight	DoB	Hometown	Previous team	NHL rights
1	(United States)	Guy Blessing	Junior	G	6' 3" (1.91 m)	180 lb (82 kg)	2001-05-08	Chandler, Arizona	Lone Star (NAHL)	—
4	(United States)	Luke Rowe	Senior	D	6' 1" (1.85 m)	206 lb (93 kg)	1998-08-08	Succasunna, New Jersey	Boston Jr. Bruins (NCDC)	—
6	(United States)	Owen Baumgartner	Freshman	D	5' 10" (1.78 m)	185 lb (84 kg)	2002-07-01	Owatonna, Minnesota	Oklahoma (NAHL)	—
7	(United States)	Brian Adams	Senior	F	5' 8" (1.73 m)	175 lb (79 kg)	1999-12-07	San Ramon, California	Wenatchee (BCHL)	—
8	(United States)	Ethan Ulrick	Freshman	F	5' 11" (1.8 m)	175 lb (79 kg)	2003-04-25	Lakewood, Illinois	Salmon Arm (BCHL)	—
9	(United States)	Lucas Coon	Junior	F	6' 0" (1.83 m)	185 lb (84 kg)	2001-11-24	Steamboat Springs, Colorado	Odessa (NAHL)	—
10	(United States)	Austin Schwartz	Junior	F	5' 9" (1.75 m)	175 lb (79 kg)	2001-06-18	Parker, Colorado	Bismarck (NAHL)	—
11	(United States)	Sam Jacobs	Freshman	F	6' 0" (1.83 m)	185 lb (84 kg)	2003-04-25	Plymouth, Minnesota	Wisconsin (NAHL)	—
12	(United States)	James Callahan	Freshman	D	6' 0" (1.83 m)	175 lb (79 kg)	2002-12-18	Minneapolis, Minnesota	Springfield (NAHL)	—
13	(United States)	Mason McCormick	Sophomore	F	6' 4" (1.93 m)	205 lb (93 kg)	2001-05-25	Verona, Wisconsin	Waterloo (USHL)	—
14	(United States)	Jacob Marti	Senior	F	5' 11" (1.8 m)	190 lb (86 kg)	2002-08-13	Highlands Ranch, Colorado	Bismarck (NAHL)	—
15	(United States)	Owen Dubois	Freshman	F	6' 4" (1.93 m)	200 lb (91 kg)	2002-07-06	Madison, Wisconsin	Aberdeen (NAHL)	—
16	(United States)	Sam Brennan	Senior	D	6' 0" (1.83 m)	200 lb (91 kg)	2000-01-16	Brighton, Michigan	Lone Star (NAHL)	—
17	(United States)	Parker Brown	Senior	F	5' 10" (1.78 m)	165 lb (75 kg)	1999-09-08	Hanahan, South Carolina	Fairbanks (NAHL)	—
18	(United States)	Holt Oliphant	Sophomore	F	5' 10" (1.78 m)	190 lb (86 kg)	2001-05-17	Northbrook, Illinois	Johnstown (NAHL)	—
19	(United States)	Nick Remissong	Freshman	F	6' 0" (1.83 m)	185 lb (84 kg)	2002-05-19	Lake Forest, Illinois	Trail (BCHL)	—
20	(United States)	Nolan Cunningham	Freshman	D	6' 2" (1.88 m)	185 lb (84 kg)	2001-12-17	Helena, Montana	Fairbanks (NAHL)	—
21	(United States)	Liam Hansson	Sophomore	F	6' 1" (1.85 m)	185 lb (84 kg)	2001-12-16	Ramsey, New Jersey	Cranbrook (BCHL)	—
22	(United States)	Chris Hedden	Sophomore	D	6' 0" (1.83 m)	185 lb (84 kg)	2002-09-20	Kalamazoo, Michigan	Omaha (USHL)	—
24	(United States)	Nate Horn	Senior	F	5' 11" (1.8 m)	160 lb (73 kg)	1999-03-02	Elk River, Minnesota	Minnesota Wilderness (NAHL)	—
26	(United States)	Clayton Cosentino	Junior	F	6' 2" (1.88 m)	198 lb (90 kg)	2000-06-18	San Carlos, California	Aberdeen (NAHL)	—
27	(United States)	Luke Robinson (C)	Senior	D	6' 3" (1.91 m)	202 lb (92 kg)	2000-02-16	Nashville, Tennessee	Dubuque (USHL)	—
28	(United States)	Mitchell Digby	Junior	D	5' 11" (1.8 m)	185 lb (84 kg)	2000-06-26	Ottawa Lake, Michigan	Lone Star (NAHL)	—
29	(United States)	Jasper Lester	Junior	D	5' 11" (1.8 m)	190 lb (86 kg)	2000-07-31	Colorado Springs, Colorado	Fairbanks (NAHL)	—
30	(United States)	Dominik Wasik	Freshman	G	6' 1" (1.85 m)	165 lb (75 kg)	2002-07-02	Superior, Wisconsin	Steinbach (MJHL)	—
35	(United States)	Carter Clafton	Freshman	G	6' 2" (1.88 m)	175 lb (79 kg)	2002-03-13	Grand Rapids, Minnesota	Amarillo (NAHL)	—
37	(United States)	Will Gavin	Senior	F	5' 10" (1.78 m)	185 lb (84 kg)	1999-10-21	Durham, Connecticut	Northern (NCDC)	—
44	(United States)	Will Staring	Freshman	D	6' 2" (1.88 m)	195 lb (88 kg)	2003-02-28	Springfield, Virginia	Dubuque (USHL)	—
51	(United States)	Maiszon Balboa	Senior	G	6' 2" (1.88 m)	195 lb (88 kg)	2000-04-18	Colorado Springs, Colorado	Shreveport (NAHL)	—
64	(United States)	Brendan Gibbons	Freshman	F	6' 2" (1.88 m)	205 lb (93 kg)	2002-06-15	South Kingstown, Rhode Island	Maine (NAHL)	—
82	(United States)	Andrew DeCarlo	Junior	F	6' 0" (1.83 m)	190 lb (86 kg)	2000-07-23	Huntington Beach, California	Lone Star (NAHL)	—

== Standings ==
2023–24 Atlantic Hockey Standings
	Conference record										Overall record					
	GP	W	L	T	OW	OL	SW	PTS	GF	GA	GP	W	L	T	GF	GA
#17 RIT †*	26	18	7	1	3	2	0	54	102	64	40	27	11	2	156	96
Holy Cross	26	13	10	3	0	3	1	46	78	62	39	21	14	4	116	93
Sacred Heart	26	14	10	2	2	2	1	45	75	70	36	14	19	3	91	113
Air Force	26	15	10	1	3	0	1	44	88	75	38	18	19	1	115	119
American International	26	12	10	4	1	1	2	42	79	68	40	20	16	4	119	111
Bentley	26	12	12	2	1	2	2	41	69	58	35	16	17	2	95	82
Niagara	26	13	10	3	3	1	1	41	78	79	39	18	18	3	111	122
Canisius	26	10	12	4	2	1	0	33	73	87	37	12	21	4	103	126
Mercyhurst	26	7	15	4	0	1	4	30	77	91	35	9	22	4	98	126
Army	26	8	16	2	0	1	1	28	66	96	35	10	23	2	93	139
Robert Morris	26	7	17	2	0	1	1	25	60	95	39	11	25	3	94	142
Championship: March 23, 2024 † indicates conference regular season champion (DeGregorio Trophy) * indicates conference tournament champion (Riley Trophy); Rankings: USCHO.com Top 20 Poll

== Schedule and results ==
Date	Time	Opponent^{#}	Rank^{#}	Site	TV	Decision	Result	Attendance	Record
Regular Season
October 7	5:05 pm	Lindenwood*		Cadet Ice Arena • Colorado Springs, Colorado	FloHockey	Blessing	W 4–1	1,659	1–0–0
October 8	5:05 pm	Lindenwood*		Cadet Ice Arena • Colorado Springs, Colorado	FloHockey	Blessing	L 3–4	1,333	1–1–0
October 12	7:05 pm	#8 Michigan State*		Cadet Ice Arena • Colorado Springs, Colorado	FloHockey	Blessing	W 6–5	2,589	2–1–0
October 13	7:05 pm	#8 Michigan State*		Cadet Ice Arena • Colorado Springs, Colorado	FloHockey	Blessing	L 3–5	2,708	2–2–0
October 20	9:07 pm	at Alaska Anchorage*		Avis Alaska Sports Complex • Anchorage, Alaska		Blessing	L 1–3	874	2–3–0
October 21	9:07 pm	at Alaska Anchorage*		Avis Alaska Sports Complex • Anchorage, Alaska		Blessing	W 4–3	715	3–3–0
October 27	7:05 pm	Colorado College*		Cadet Ice Arena • Colorado Springs, Colorado (Rivalry)	FloHockey	Blessing	L 2–6	2,701	3–4–0
October 28	6:05 pm	at #2 Denver*		Magness Arena • Denver, Colorado		Blessing	L 0–4	6,278	3–5–0
November 3	5:05 pm	at Niagara		Dwyer Arena • Lewiston, New York	FloHockey	Blessing	W 3–2 ^{OT}	637	4–5–0 (1–0–0)
November 4	5:05 pm	at Niagara		Dwyer Arena • Lewiston, New York	FloHockey	Blessing	L 3–4	755	4–6–0 (1–1–0)
November 10	7:05 pm	Army		Cadet Ice Arena • Colorado Springs, Colorado (Rivalry)	FloHockey	Blessing	W 4–3 ^{OT}	2,629	5–6–0 (2–1–0)
November 11	7:05 pm	Army		Cadet Ice Arena • Colorado Springs, Colorado (Rivalry)	FloHockey	Blessing	W 4–0	2,250	6–6–0 (3–1–0)
November 18	5:05 pm	at Mercyhurst		Mercyhurst Ice Center • Erie, Pennsylvania	FloHockey	Blessing	W 5–2	734	7–6–0 (4–1–0)
November 19	5:05 pm	at Mercyhurst		Mercyhurst Ice Center • Erie, Pennsylvania	FloHockey	Blessing	L 1–5	783	7–7–0 (4–2–0)
November 24	11:00 am	at Canisius		LECOM Harborcenter • Buffalo, New York	FloHockey	Blessing	L 1–3	731	7–8–0 (4–3–0)
November 25	11:00 am	at Canisius		LECOM Harborcenter • Buffalo, New York	FloHockey	Blessing	T 2–2 ^{SOW}	621	7–8–1 (4–3–1)
December 1	7:05 pm	Bentley		Cadet Ice Arena • Colorado Springs, Colorado	FloHockey	Blessing	W 3–2 ^{OT}	2,213	8–8–1 (5–3–1)
December 2	5:05 pm	Bentley		Cadet Ice Arena • Colorado Springs, Colorado	FloHockey	Blessing	L 0–3	2,190	8–9–1 (5–4–1)
Holiday Face–Off
December 28	6:30 pm	at #6 Wisconsin*		Fiserv Forum • Milwaukee, Wisconsin (Holiday Face–Off semifinal)	BSW	Blessing	L 0–3	8,652	8–10–1
December 29	3:00 pm	vs. Minnesota Duluth*		Fiserv Forum • Milwaukee, Wisconsin (Holiday Face–Off consolation game)	BSW	Blessing	L 1–4	8,689	8–11–1
January 5	5:05 pm	at Bentley		Bentley Arena • Waltham, Massachusetts	FloHockey	Blessing	W 3–1	1,389	9–11–1 (6–4–1)
January 6	5:05 pm	at Bentley		Bentley Arena • Waltham, Massachusetts	FloHockey	Blessing	W 7–3	1,555	10–11–1 (7–4–1)
January 12	7:05 pm	American International		Cadet Ice Arena • Colorado Springs, Colorado	FloHockey, Altitude2	Blessing	W 6–2	2,318	11–11–1 (8–4–1)
January 13	5:05 pm	American International		Cadet Ice Arena • Colorado Springs, Colorado	FloHockey	Blessing	L 1–4	2,464	11–12–1 (8–5–1)
January 19	5:05 pm	at Army		Tate Rink • West Point, New York (Rivalry)	FloHockey	Blessing	W 8–1	2,528	12–12–1 (9–5–1)
January 20	2:05 pm	at Army		Tate Rink • West Point, New York (Rivalry)	FloHockey	Blessing	W 7–6	2,548	13–12–1 (10–5–1)
January 26	7:05 pm	Canisius		Cadet Ice Arena • Colorado Springs, Colorado	FloHockey	Blessing	W 5–1	2,318	14–12–1 (11–5–1)
January 27	5:05 pm	Canisius		Cadet Ice Arena • Colorado Springs, Colorado	FloHockey, Altitude	Blessing	L 3–5	2,424	14–13–1 (11–6–1)
February 2	5:05 pm	at Holy Cross		Hart Center • Worcester, Massachusetts	FloHockey	Blessing	L 3–6	1,906	14–14–1 (11–7–1)
February 3	5:05 pm	at Holy Cross		Hart Center • Worcester, Massachusetts	FloHockey	Blessing	L 2–5	1,812	14–15–1 (11–8–1)
February 9	7:05 pm	Sacred Heart		Cadet Ice Arena • Colorado Springs, Colorado	FloHockey	Blessing	L 2–3	2,436	14–16–1 (11–9–1)
February 10	5:05 pm	Sacred Heart		Cadet Ice Arena • Colorado Springs, Colorado	FloHockey, Altitude2	Blessing	W 2–0	2,422	15–16–1 (12–9–1)
February 16	5:05 pm	at #20 RIT		Gene Polisseni Center • Henrietta, New York	FloHockey	Balboa	L 3–7	2,954	15–17–1 (12–10–1)
February 17	3:05 pm	at #20 RIT		Gene Polisseni Center • Henrietta, New York	FloHockey, Altitude2	Blessing	W 3–2	4,300	16–17–1 (13–10–1)
February 23	7:05 pm	Robert Morris		Cadet Ice Arena • Colorado Springs, Colorado	FloHockey	Blessing	W 5–2	2,670	17–17–1 (14–10–1)
February 24	5:05 pm	Robert Morris		Cadet Ice Arena • Colorado Springs, Colorado	FloHockey	Blessing	W 2–1	2,698	18–17–1 (15–10–1)
Atlantic Hockey Tournament
March 8	7:05 pm	American International*		Cadet Ice Arena • Colorado Springs, Colorado (Quarterfinal game 1)	FloHockey	Blessing	L 1–3	1,818	18–18–1
March 9	7:05 pm	American International*		Cadet Ice Arena • Colorado Springs, Colorado (Quarterfinal game 2)	FloHockey	Blessing	L 2–3 ^{OT}	1,688	18–19–1
*Non-conference game. ^{#}Rankings from USCHO.com Poll. All times are in Mountain Time. Source:

== Scoring statistics ==
Name	Position	Games	Goals	Assists	Points	PIM
Chris Hedden	D	38	8	29	37	37
Will Gavin	F	38	19	17	36	24
Luke Rowe	D	35	6	23	29	70
Clayton Cosentino	F	38	10	18	28	6
Parker Brown	F	37	8	13	21	27
Austin Schwartz	F	38	10	9	19	10
Mason McCormick	LW	38	6	9	15	44
Holt Oliphant	F	38	10	4	14	10
Andrew DeCarlo	F	32	5	9	14	12
Brendan Gibbons	F	34	7	5	12	14
Owen Baumgartner	D	24	4	6	10	12
Will Staring	D	33	1	8	9	20
Luke Robinson	D	38	2	7	9	32
Brian Adams	F	30	2	6	8	4
Nate Horn	F	33	3	4	7	12
Sam Brennan	D	36	3	4	7	16
Owen Dubois	F	30	4	2	6	6
Nick Remissong	F	34	1	5	6	19
Nolan Cunningham	D	26	0	5	5	2
Lucas Coon	F	11	3	2	5	2
Mitchell Digby	D	27	2	1	3	11
Jacob Marti	F	15	1	1	2	21
Ethan Ullrick	F	7	0	0	0	15
Jasper Lester	D	2	0	0	0	0
Maiszon Balboa	G	4	0	0	0	0
Carter Clafton	G	1	0	0	0	0
Guy Blessing	G	38	0	0	0	0
Sam Jacobs	F	1	0	0	0	0
James Callahan	D	2	0	0	0	0
Total			115	187	302	424

== Goaltending statistics ==
Name	Games	Minutes	Wins	Losses	Ties	Goals against	Saves	Shutouts	SV %	GAA
Carter Clafton	9	10:46	0	0	0	0	3	0	1.000	0.00
Guy Blessing	38	2159:38	18	18	1	101	895	2	.899	2.81
Maiszon Balboa	11	99:29	0	1	0	5	39	0	.886	3.02
Empty Net	-	40:10	-	-	-	13	-	-	-	-
Total	38	2310:03	18	19	1	119	937	2	.889	3.09

== Rankings ==
Poll	Week																										
Poll	Pre	1	2	3	4	5	6	7	8	9	10	11	12	13	14	15	16	17	18	19	20	21	22	23	24	25	26 (Final)
USCHO.com	NR	NR	NR	NR	NR	NR	NR	NR	NR	NR	NR	–	NR	NR	NR	NR	NR	NR	NR	NR	NR	NR	NR	NR	NR	–	NR
USA Hockey	NR	NR	NR	NR	NR	NR	NR	NR	NR	NR	NR	NR	–	NR	NR	NR	NR	NR	NR	NR	NR	NR	NR	NR	NR	NR	NR

Note: USCHO did not release a poll in weeks 11 and 25.
Note: USA Hockey did not release a poll in week 12.

== Awards and honors ==
Player	Award	Ref
Luke Robinson	Derek Hines Unsung Hero Award	
Austin Schwartz	Atlantic Hockey Best Defensive Forward	
Will Gavin	Atlantic Hockey First Team	
Chris Hedden	Atlantic Hockey Second Team	
Luke Rowe	Atlantic Hockey Third Team	
