= 2023–24 Mercyhurst Lakers men's ice hockey season =

- Conference: 9th Atlantic Hockey
- Home ice: Mercyhurst Ice Center

Rankings
- USCHO: NR
- USA Hockey: NR

Record
- Overall: 9–22–4
- Conference: 7–15–4
- Home: 4–10–1
- Road: 5–12–3

Coaches and captains
- Head coach: Rick Gotkin
- Assistant coaches: Greg Gardner; Tom Peffall; Ryan Zapolski
- Captain: Marko Reifenberger
- Alternate captains: Steven Agriogianis; Adrien Bisson; Mickey Burns

The 2023–24 Mercyhurst Lakers men's ice hockey season was the 37th season of play for the program, the 25th at the Division I level, and the 21st in Atlantic Hockey. The Lakers represented Mercyhurst University and were coached by Rick Gotkin, in his 36th season.

== Season ==
Mercyhurst began the season enough, sandwiching a pair of shootout victories between very narrow losses to two Big Ten teams. The Lakers then spent the remainder of the first half of their season playing around the .500 mark, seeing decent scoring totals buoyed by solid if unspectacular defensive play. The result was that the Lakers were sitting with a winning record in conference play and had an outside chance to earn a bye into the conference quarterfinals.

In the second half, Mercyhurst started with their best offensive performance to date, scoring 7 goals against Sacred Heart. Unfortunately, the offense dried up afterwards. Mercyhurst went over a month without a win, losing nine consecutive games. The streak sent the team plummeting to the bottom of the standings and also saw their defense surrender many glorious scoring opportunities. Mercyhurst managed to pull themselves out of the dive with a surprising win over ranked RIT but by then the damage had been done. The Lakers finished the year in 9th place and were forced to hit the road for their first round match.

The offense again went silent and Canisius scored the first four goals in the game. With nothing left to lose, Rick Gotkin pulled Owen Say for an extra attacked when the team got on a mid-third period power play and the extra attacker enabled the team to finally get on the scoreboard. Several minutes later, The Griffins were assessed a major penalty and gave Mercyhurst the opening the needed. The team was unable to capitalize during the first half of the power play but, after Canisius was given a slashing minor, Mercyhurst managed to add a second goal on the 6-on-3 man-advantage. Still needing two goals to tie, Say was again pulled when play resumed but, after about a minute, Canisius was able to cage an empty-net goal that sealed the game.

On November 11, Rick Gotkin became just the 16th coach in NCAA history to win 600 games. He was also the 7th coach to do so with one team.

Due to a snowstorm, the game against Niagara scheduled on January 13 was postponed to a later date.

== Departures ==
Player	Position	Nationality	Cause
Jon Bendorf	Forward	United States	Graduation (retired)
Carson Brière	Forward	United States	Dismissed from program (signed with HC 19 Humenné)
Eric Esposito	Forward	United States	Graduation (signed with Orlando Solar Bears)
Gueorgui Feduolov	Forward	United States	Graduation (signed with Norfolk Admirals)
Tyler Harmon	Goaltender	United States	Graduation (signed with Atlanta Gladiators)
Dalton Hunter	Forward	United States	Graduation (signed with Fayetteville Marksmen)
Paul Maust	Forward	United States	Graduate transfer to Robert Morris
Joey Maziarz	Defenseman	Canada	Graduation (retired)
Brendon Michaelian	Defenseman	United States	Graduation (retired)
Owen Norton	Defenseman	Canada	Graduation (signed with Maine Mariners)
Rylee St. Onge	Forward	Canada	Graduate transfer to Robert Morris
Cade Townend	Defenseman	Canada	Graduate transfer to Robert Morris
Carver Watson	Defenseman	United States	Graduation (retired)

== Recruiting ==
Player	Position	Nationality	Age	Notes
Barrett Brooks	Forward	United States	21	Stevens Point, WI; transfer from Western Michigan
Simon Bucheler	Goaltender	Canada	21	Saint-Laurent, QC
Tyler DesRochers	Defenseman	United States	20	Howell, NJ
Davis Fry	Forward	Canada	20	Regina, SK
Sean James	Forward	Canada	21	Almonte, ON
Will Margel	Forward	United States	22	Potomac, MD; transfer from New Hampshire
Jackson McCarthy	Defenseman	United States	21	West Seneca, NY
Connor Pelc	Forward	United States	20	Buffalo, NY
Cameron Ricotta	Forward	United States	21	Cheektowaga, NY
Trent Sambrook	Defenseman	Canada	21	Winnipeg, MB
Boris Skalos	Forward	United States	20	Clifton, NJ
Spencer Smith	Forward	Canada	21	St. Catharines, ON
Jaryd Sych	Defenseman	Canada	20	Airdrie, AB

== Roster ==
As of September 14, 2023

No.	Nat.	Player	Class	Pos	Height	Weight	DoB	Hometown	Previous team	NHL rights
1	(United States)	Matt Lenz	Junior	G	5' 11" (1.8 m)	170 lb (77 kg)	1999-06-02	Grapevine, Texas	Steinbach Pistons (MJHL)	—
2	(United States)	Philip Waugh	Senior	F	6' 4" (1.93 m)	217 lb (98 kg)	2000-01-10	McLean, Virginia	P.A.L. Jr. Islanders (NCDC)	—
3	(United States)	Jake Beaune	Junior	D	6' 3" (1.91 m)	195 lb (88 kg)	2000-06-13	Livonia, Michigan	Lincoln Stars (USHL)	—
4	(Canada)	Jaryd Sych	Freshman	D	6' 2" (1.88 m)	194 lb (88 kg)	2003-02-10	Airdrie, Alberta	Notre Dame Hounds (SJHL)	—
5	(United States)	Jackson McCarthy	Freshman	D	6' 1" (1.85 m)	205 lb (93 kg)	2002-09-27	West Seneca, New York	Northeast Generals (NAHL)	—
6	(United States)	Trent Sambrook	Freshman	D	5' 9" (1.75 m)	165 lb (75 kg)	2002-01-03	Winnipeg, Manitoba	Winkler Flyers (MJHL)	—
7	(United States)	Tyler DesRochers	Freshman	D	6' 0" (1.83 m)	185 lb (84 kg)	2003-04-02	Howell, New Jersey	Johnstown Tomahawks (NAHL)	—
8	(United States)	Tyler Gaulin	Sophomore	F	6' 0" (1.83 m)	178 lb (81 kg)	2001-11-09	Kingston, New Hampshire	Maine Nordiques (NAHL)	—
9	(Canada)	Sean James	Freshman	F	6' 0" (1.83 m)	161 lb (73 kg)	2002-09-10	Almonte, Ontario	Smiths Falls Bears (CCHL)	—
10	(United States)	Steven Agriogianis (A)	Senior	F	5' 9" (1.75 m)	175 lb (79 kg)	1999-01-07	East Hanover, New Jersey	Northeastern (HEA)	—
11	(United States)	Barrett Brooks	Sophomore	F	5' 8" (1.73 m)	170 lb (77 kg)	2001-12-19	Stevens Point, Wisconsin	Western Michigan (NCHC)	—
12	(United States)	Dustin Geregach	Junior	D	6' 0" (1.83 m)	181 lb (82 kg)	2001-11-14	McKees Rocks, Pennsylvania	Johnstown Tomahawks (NAHL)	—
14	(United States)	Boris Skalos	Freshman	F	5' 11" (1.8 m)	176 lb (80 kg)	2003-01-06	Clifton, New Jersey	Fargo Force (USHL)	—
15	(United States)	Tommy Bannister	Sophomore	F	5' 9" (1.75 m)	180 lb (82 kg)	2001-09-05	Clayton, New York	New Jersey Titans (NAHL)	—
16	(United States)	Ryan Coughlin	Sophomore	F	6' 0" (1.83 m)	180 lb (82 kg)	2001-02-09	Charlotte, North Carolina	New Jersey Titans (NAHL)	—
18	(Canada)	Davis Fry	Freshman	F	6' 4" (1.93 m)	194 lb (88 kg)	2003-08-04	Regina, Saskatchewan	Steinbach Pistons (MJHL)	—
19	(United States)	Garrett Dahm	Junior	F	6' 1" (1.85 m)	175 lb (79 kg)	2000-06-29	Belleville, Illinois	Youngstown Phantoms (USHL)	—
20	(Canada)	Keanan Stewart	Senior	F	6' 3" (1.91 m)	195 lb (88 kg)	2000-04-29	Elmira, Ontario	Burlington Cougars (OJHL)	—
21	(United States)	Mickey Burns (A)	Senior	F	5' 9" (1.75 m)	175 lb (79 kg)	2000-04-03	Wayne, New Jersey	Vermont (HEA)	—
22	(United States)	Kyler Head	Senior	F	6' 4" (1.93 m)	215 lb (98 kg)	1999-07-13	Malone, New York	Robert Morris (AHA)	—
23	(United States)	Cameron Ricotta	Freshman	F	5' 8" (1.73 m)	170 lb (77 kg)	2002-05-17	Cheektowaga, New York	Fairbanks Ice Dogs (NAHL)	—
24	(United States)	Marko Reifenberger (C)	Senior	F	6' 0" (1.83 m)	190 lb (86 kg)	1999-01-19	Hastings, Minnesota	Minnesota Magicians (NAHL)	—
26	(Canada)	Spencer Smith	Freshman	F	5' 8" (1.73 m)	174 lb (79 kg)	2002-05-20	St. Catharines, Ontario	Penticton Vees (BCHL)	—
27	(United States)	Nicholas Kent	Sophomore	D	5' 10" (1.78 m)	190 lb (86 kg)	2001-02-01	Anaheim, California	Vernon Vipers (BCHL)	—
28	(United States)	Tyler Nasca	Sophomore	D	5' 11" (1.8 m)	160 lb (73 kg)	2001-01-09	Buffalo, New York	Lone Star Brahmas (NAHL)	—
29	(Canada)	Adrien Bisson (A)	Graduate	D	6' 2" (1.88 m)	185 lb (84 kg)	1999-01-18	Cornwall, Ontario	Maine (HEA)	—
31	(Canada)	Owen Say	Sophomore	G	6' 2" (1.88 m)	175 lb (79 kg)	2001-06-05	London, Ontario	Salmon Arm Silverbacks (BCHL)	—
37	(United States)	Connor Pelc	Freshman	F	6' 2" (1.88 m)	194 lb (88 kg)	2003-04-28	Buffalo, New York	Sioux Falls Stampede (USHL)	—
39	(United States)	Will Margel	Junior	F	5' 9" (1.75 m)	165 lb (75 kg)	2001-03-16	Potomac, Maryland	New Hampshire (HEA)	—
44	(Canada)	Simon Bucheler	Freshman	G	6' 2" (1.88 m)	188 lb (85 kg)	2002-03-29	Saint-Laurent, Quebec	Shreveport Mudbugs (NAHL)	—

== Standings ==
2023–24 Atlantic Hockey Standings
	Conference record										Overall record					
	GP	W	L	T	OW	OL	SW	PTS	GF	GA	GP	W	L	T	GF	GA
#17 RIT †*	26	18	7	1	3	2	0	54	102	64	40	27	11	2	156	96
Holy Cross	26	13	10	3	0	3	1	46	78	62	39	21	14	4	116	93
Sacred Heart	26	14	10	2	2	2	1	45	75	70	36	14	19	3	91	113
Air Force	26	15	10	1	3	0	1	44	88	75	38	18	19	1	115	119
American International	26	12	10	4	1	1	2	42	79	68	40	20	16	4	119	111
Bentley	26	12	12	2	1	2	2	41	69	58	35	16	17	2	95	82
Niagara	26	13	10	3	3	1	1	41	78	79	39	18	18	3	111	122
Canisius	26	10	12	4	2	1	0	33	73	87	37	12	21	4	103	126
Mercyhurst	26	7	15	4	0	1	4	30	77	91	35	9	22	4	98	126
Army	26	8	16	2	0	1	1	28	66	96	35	10	23	2	93	139
Robert Morris	26	7	17	2	0	1	1	25	60	95	39	11	25	3	94	142
Championship: March 23, 2024 † indicates conference regular season champion (DeGregorio Trophy) * indicates conference tournament champion (Riley Trophy); Rankings: USCHO.com Top 20 Poll

== Schedule and results ==
Date	Time	Opponent^{#}	Rank^{#}	Site	TV	Decision	Result	Attendance	Record
Regular Season
October 7	7:00 p.m.	#13 Ohio State*		Mercyhurst Ice Center • Erie, Pennsylvania	FloHockey	Say	L 3–4	2,050	0–1–0
October 14	4:00 p.m.	Robert Morris		Mercyhurst Ice Center • Erie, Pennsylvania	FloHockey	Say	T 3–3 ^{SOW}	582	0–1–1 (0–0–1)
October 21	7:00 p.m.	at Niagara		Dwyer Arena • Lewiston, New York	FloHockey	Say	T 3–3 ^{SOW}	988	0–1–2 (0–0–2)
October 26	7:30 p.m.	at Notre Dame*		Compton Family Ice Arena • Notre Dame, Indiana	Peacock	Bucheler	L 3–4 ^{OT}	3,919	0–2–2
October 27	7:00 p.m.	at Notre Dame*		Compton Family Ice Arena • Notre Dame, Indiana	Peacock	Bucheler	L 0–5	5,022	0–3–2
November 3	7:07 p.m.	at Bowling Green*		Slater Family Ice Arena • Bowling Green, Ohio	FloHockey	Say	W 4–3 ^{OT}	2,814	1–3–2
November 4	7:07 p.m.	at Bowling Green*		Slater Family Ice Arena • Bowling Green, Ohio	FloHockey	Say	L 2–4	3,065	1–4–2
November 10	7:05 p.m.	at #20 RIT		Gene Polisseni Center • Henrietta, New York	FloHockey	Say	L 2–5	3,925	1–5–2 (0–1–2)
November 11	5:05 p.m.	at #20 RIT		Gene Polisseni Center • Henrietta, New York	FloHockey	Bucheler	W 2–0	3,388	2–5–2 (1–1–2)
November 18	7:00 p.m.	Air Force		Mercyhurst Ice Center • Erie, Pennsylvania	FloHockey	Bucheler	L 2–5	734	2–6–2 (1–2–2)
November 19	4:00 p.m.	Air Force		Mercyhurst Ice Center • Erie, Pennsylvania	FloHockey	Say	W 5–1	783	3–6–2 (2–2–2)
November 24	7:05 p.m.	at Miami*		Mercyhurst Ice Center • Erie, Pennsylvania		Say	W 4–3 ^{OT}	1,571	4–6–2
November 26	4:00 p.m.	Miami*		Mercyhurst Ice Center • Erie, Pennsylvania	FloHockey	Say	L 0–2	630	4–7–2
December 1	7:00 p.m.	at Canisius		LECOM Harborcenter • Buffalo, New York	FloHockey	Say	T 3–3 ^{SOW}	719	4–7–3 (2–2–3)
December 2	7:00 p.m.	Canisius		Mercyhurst Ice Center • Erie, Pennsylvania	FloHockey	Say	W 5–1	635	5–7–3 (3–2–3)
December 8	7:00 p.m.	Army		Mercyhurst Ice Center • Erie, Pennsylvania	FloHockey	Say	L 3–4	1,017	5–8–3 (3–3–3)
December 9	4:00 p.m.	Army		Mercyhurst Ice Center • Erie, Pennsylvania	FloHockey	Say	W 4–3	1,005	6–8–3 (4–3–3)
December 30	5:00 p.m.	at Ohio State*		Value City Arena • Columbus, Ohio		Say	L 3–5	5,096	6–9–3
January 5	7:00 p.m.	at Sacred Heart		Martire Family Arena • Fairfield, Connecticut	FloHockey	Say	W 7–2	2,497	7–9–3 (5–3–3)
January 6	3:00 p.m.	at Sacred Heart		Martire Family Arena • Fairfield, Connecticut	FloHockey	Say	L 1–2	3,063	7–10–3 (5–4–3)
January 11	7:00 p.m.	at Canisius		LECOM Harborcenter • Buffalo, New York	FloHockey	Say	L 1–4	569	7–11–3 (5–5–3)
January 19	7:05 p.m.	at Bentley		Bentley Arena • Waltham, Massachusetts	FloHockey	Say	L 0–4	879	7–12–3 (5–6–3)
January 20	4:05 p.m.	at Bentley		Bentley Arena • Waltham, Massachusetts	FloHockey	Bucheler	L 4–8	945	7–13–3 (5–7–3)
January 26	7:00 p.m.	Holy Cross		Mercyhurst Ice Center • Erie, Pennsylvania	FloHockey	Say	L 2–5	1,034	7–14–3 (5–8–3)
January 27	5:00 p.m.	Holy Cross		Mercyhurst Ice Center • Erie, Pennsylvania	FloHockey	Say	L 3–5	1,074	7–15–3 (5–9–3)
February 2	7:00 p.m.	Robert Morris		Mercyhurst Ice Center • Erie, Pennsylvania	FloHockey	Say	L 2–5	1,042	7–16–3 (5–10–3)
February 3	7:00 p.m.	at Robert Morris		Clearview Arena • Neville Township, Pennsylvania	FloHockey	Bucheler	L 3–4	759	7–17–3 (5–11–3)
February 9	7:00 p.m.	#20 RIT		Mercyhurst Ice Center • Erie, Pennsylvania	FloHockey	Bucheler	L 6–7 ^{OT}	1,017	7–18–3 (5–12–3)
February 10	4:00 p.m.	#20 RIT		Mercyhurst Ice Center • Erie, Pennsylvania	FloHockey	Say	W 3–2	1,027	8–18–3 (6–12–3)
February 16	4:35 p.m.	at American International		MassMutual Center • Springfield, Massachusetts	FloHockey	Say	L 1–4	228	8–19–3 (6–13–3)
February 17	7:05 p.m.	at American International		MassMutual Center • Springfield, Massachusetts	FloHockey	Say	T 2–2 ^{SOW}	—	8–19–4 (6–13–4)
February 20	7:00 p.m.	Niagara		Mercyhurst Ice Center • Erie, Pennsylvania	FloHockey	Say	L 1–4	924	8–20–4 (6–14–4)
February 22	7:00 p.m.	at Niagara		Dwyer Arena • Lewiston, New York	FloHockey	Say	W 6–1	719	9–20–4 (7–14–4)
February 24	7:00 p.m.	Niagara		Mercyhurst Ice Center • Erie, Pennsylvania	FloHockey	Say	L 3–4	1,002	9–21–4 (7–15–4)
Atlantic Hockey Tournament
March 2	6:05 p.m.	at Canisius*		LECOM Harborcenter • Buffalo, New York (First Round)	FloHockey	Say	L 2–5	388	9–22–4
*Non-conference game. ^{#}Rankings from USCHO.com Poll. All times are in Eastern Time. Source:

== Scoring statistics ==
Name	Position	Games	Goals	Assists	Points	PIM
Garrett Dahm	F	35	7	21	28	23
Boris Skalos	F	35	15	12	27	10
Steven Agriogianis	RW	35	6	17	23	8
Will Margel	F	31	6	13	19	10
Dustin Geregach	D	34	4	14	18	35
Mickey Burns	LW	35	5	13	18	14
Keanan Stewart	F	31	10	5	15	10
Kyler Head	F	30	6	9	15	36
Philip Waugh	D	31	10	4	14	32
Trent Sambrook	D	28	3	10	13	14
Ryan Coughlin	F	27	5	7	12	8
Marko Reifenberger	C	33	5	6	11	37
Barrett Brooks	F	27	4	6	10	23
Tommy Bannister	F	27	3	7	10	4
Spencer Smith	F	34	3	5	8	0
Adrien Bisson	F	23	2	6	8	16
Jake Beaune	D	35	2	6	8	33
Connor Pelc	F	29	1	4	5	14
Cameron Ricotta	F	5	1	1	2	0
Tyler DesRochers	D	21	0	2	2	10
Sean James	F	8	0	1	1	0
Nicholas Kent	D	16	0	1	1	4
Tyler Nasca	D	24	0	1	1	6
Jaryd Sych	D	3	0	0	0	0
Owen Say	G	31	0	0	0	2
Tyler Gaulin	F	8	0	0	0	8
Simon Bucheler	G	8	0	0	0	0
Davis Fry	F	5	0	0	0	2
Total			98	171	269	359

== Goaltending statistics ==
Name	Games	Minutes	Wins	Losses	Ties	Goals against	Saves	Shut-outs	SV %	GAA
Owen Say	31	1697:52	8	17	4	91	950	0	.913	3.22
Simon Bucheler	12	397:45	1	5	0	26	237	1	.901	3.92
Empty Net	-	40:01	-	-	-	9	-	-	-	-
Total	35	2135:38	9	22	4	126	1187	1	.904	3.54

== Rankings ==
Poll	Week																										
Poll	Pre	1	2	3	4	5	6	7	8	9	10	11	12	13	14	15	16	17	18	19	20	21	22	23	24	25	26 (Final)
USCHO.com	NR	NR	NR	NR	NR	NR	NR	NR	NR	NR	NR	–	NR	NR	NR	NR	NR	NR	NR	NR	NR	NR	NR	NR	NR	–	NR
USA Hockey	NR	NR	NR	NR	NR	NR	NR	NR	NR	NR	NR	NR	–	NR	NR	NR	NR	NR	NR	NR	NR	NR	NR	NR	NR	NR	NR

Note: USCHO did not release a poll in weeks 11 and 25.
Note: USA Hockey did not release a poll in week 12.

== Awards and honors ==
Player	Award	Ref
Owen Say	Atlantic Hockey Third Team	
Trent Sambrook	Atlantic Hockey Rookie Team	
Boris Skalos	Atlantic Hockey Rookie Team	
