= 2023–24 Niagara Purple Eagles men's ice hockey season =

- Conference: 7th Atlantic Hockey
- Home ice: Dwyer Arena

Rankings
- USCHO: NR
- USA Hockey: NR

Record
- Overall: 18–18–3
- Conference: 13–10–3
- Home: 8–5–3
- Road: 10–13–0

Coaches and captains
- Head coach: Jason Lammers
- Assistant coaches: Mark Phalon; Nate Skidmore
- Captain: Jay Ahearn
- Alternate captain(s): Olivier Gauthier; Shane Ott

The 2023–24 Niagara Purple Eagles men's ice hockey season was the 28th season of play for the program, the 26th at the Division I level and the 14th in Atlantic Hockey. The Purple Eagles represented Niagara University, played their homes games at the Dwyer Arena and were coached by Jason Lammers in his 7th season.

== Season ==
Niagara lost more than half of its players in the offseason but the biggest void was in goal. In losing their starter and likely replacement, the team brought in graduate transfer Jarrett Fiske to compete with Ryan Ouellette for the starting role. Fiske had a rather poor start to the season, surrendering 5 goals in 40 minutes to Omaha. Ouellette then became the starter for about a month but could not establish himself in the position. Fiske regain the starting job in early November and performed much better the second time around. He remained the primary netminder for the remainder of the year with Ouellette and Mitchell Day filling in now and again.

The offense, too, was in need of new leadership and got a boon with freshman forwards Tyler Wallace and Jack Richard. The two newcomers combined with upperclassmen Jay Ahearn and Carter Randklev to lead the offense and keep the team competitive on most nights.

After an up-and-down opening to the year, Niagara went through a very poor stretch in December and January, going 1–6 and putting themselves behind the 8-ball. They were able to arrest their slide with a win over RIT, the best team in the conference, and went 8–3–2 down the stretch. The improved play didn't quite get the team a bye into the quarterfinal round but it did afford them with home ice in the opening round of the playoffs.

Niagara opened its postseason with a fairly easy win over Army despite Richard being ejected for slew-footing in the first period. The major penalty resulted in the only goal for Army but otherwise didn't affect the outcome of the game. Niagara then faced Sacred Heart in the quarterfinals and found a opponent in the midst of a losing skid. The Eagles took full advantage and flew through the Pioneers' defense. Niagara scored 11 goals in two games, give Fiske all the goal support he needed for a sweep. Randklev was particularly outstanding, recording 6 points in the two games.

In the semifinals, Niagara found itself opposite RIT, who had lost the season series to the Purple Eagles despite finishing first in the standings. Niagara was hoping for more of the same but the Tigers did not take the underdogs lightly and kept to their defensive structure. Niagara piled on the shots in the opening game, recording 39 in regulation, but were only able to get one into the RIT cage, and even then they needed an extra attacker. The second saw RIT jump out to a 3–0 lead in the first period and Niagara had no answer. The Eagles were able to cut into the advantage in the final frame but it was too little too late and Niagara ended its season with a pair of losses.

Due to a snowstorm, the game against Mercyhurst scheduled on January 13 was postponed to a later date.

== Departures ==
Player	Position	Nationality	Cause
Lucas Bahn	Defenseman	United States	Graduation (retired)
Matt Cameron	Forward	United States	Left program (retired)
Casey Carreau	Forward	United States	Graduation (signed with Kansas City Mavericks)
Ryan Cox	Forward	Canada	Graduation (signed with Toledo Walleye)
Jack DeBoer	Forward	United States	Graduation (signed with EHC Neuwied)
Mike Egan	Forward	United States	Graduation (signed with Pensacola Ice Flyers)
Zane Kindrachuk	Forward	Canada	Left program (retired)
Ryan Naumovski	Forward	United States	Graduate transfer to Augustana
Albin Nilsson	Forward	Sweden	Graduate transfer to Miami
Jason Pineo	Forward	Canada	Graduation (signed with Wichita Thunder)
David Posma	Defenseman	Canada	Left mid-season (returned to juniors)
Jake Sibell	Goaltender	United States	Transferred to St. Thomas
Brandon Stanley	Forward	Canada	Graduation (retired)
Chad Veltri	Goaltender	United States	Graduate transfer to Robert Morris
Jordan Wishman	Defenseman	United States	Graduation (signed with Wheeling Nailers)

== Recruiting ==
Player	Position	Nationality	Age	Notes
Mitchell Day	Goaltender	United States	21	St. Louis, MO
Jarrett Fiske	Goaltender	United States	24	Erie, PA; graduate transfer from American International
Aron Jessli	Forward	Norway	18	Lørenskog, NOR
Steven Kesslering	Forward	Canada	21	Viceroy, SK
Jaedon Leslie	Forward	Canada	25	St. Albert, AB; graduate transfer from Ohio State
Cole Mickel	Defenseman	United States	21	Broomfield, CO
Alex Murray	Defenseman	United States	23	Glenview, IL; transfer from Miami
Connor Mylymok	Forward	Canada	23	Jackson, MS; transfer from Alaska
Luke Mylymok	Forward	Canada	21	Wilcox, SK; transfer from Minnesota Duluth
Jack Richard	Forward	Canada	20	Stoney Creek, ON
Tyler Wallace	Forward	Canada	21	Calgary, AB

== Roster ==
As of September 15, 2023.

No.	Nat.	Player	Class	Pos	Height	Weight	DoB	Hometown	Previous team	NHL rights
2	(United States)	Jonathan Ziskie	Sophomore	F	6' 3" (1.91 m)	187 lb (85 kg)	2001-03-19	Macomb, Michigan	Bismarck Bobcats (NAHL)	—
3	(United States)	Cole Mickel	Freshman	D	5' 11" (1.8 m)	170 lb (77 kg)	2002-05-03	Broomfield, Colorado	Wisconsin Windigo (NAHL)	—
4	(Latvia)	Gļebs Prohorenkovs	Sophomore	F	6' 2" (1.88 m)	187 lb (85 kg)	2001-11-12	Riga, Latvia	Amarillo Wranglers (NAHL)	—
5	(United States)	Noah Carlin	Junior	D	6' 0" (1.83 m)	174 lb (79 kg)	2000-06-13	Marine City, Michigan	Omaha Lancers (USHL)	—
7	(Canada)	Steven Kesslering	Freshman	F	5' 11" (1.8 m)	190 lb (86 kg)	2002-05-17	Viceroy, Saskatchewan	Battlefords North Stars (SJHL)	—
8	(Canada)	Luke Mylymok	Senior	F	5' 11" (1.8 m)	183 lb (83 kg)	2001-09-29	Wilcox, Saskatchewan	Minnesota Duluth (NCHC)	—
9	(United States)	Jay Ahearn (C)	Junior	F	5' 11" (1.8 m)	170 lb (77 kg)	2001-05-23	Staten Island, New York	Johnstown Tomahawks (NAHL)	—
10	(United States)	Carter Randklev	Senior	F	5' 8" (1.73 m)	163 lb (74 kg)	1999-11-05	Moorhead, Minnesota	Fargo Force (USHL)	—
11	(Canada)	Olivier Gauthier (A)	Senior	F	5' 10" (1.78 m)	185 lb (84 kg)	1999-04-09	Ferme-Neuve, Quebec	Alaska Anchorage (WCHA)	—
13	(Canada)	Jack Richard	Freshman	F	6' 4" (1.93 m)	180 lb (82 kg)	2002-12-13	Stoney Creek, Ontario	Burlington Cougars (OJHL)	—
14	(Canada)	Connor Mylymok	Junior	F	6' 1" (1.85 m)	205 lb (93 kg)	2000-03-18	Wilcox, Saskatchewan	Alaska (NCAA)	—
16	(Canada)	Jaedon Leslie	Graduate	F	6' 1" (1.85 m)	187 lb (85 kg)	1998-08-04	St. Albert, Alberta	Ohio State (Big Ten)	—
17	(United States)	Max Ruoho	Sophomore	D	6' 0" (1.83 m)	174 lb (79 kg)	2001-03-05	Madison, Wisconsin	Minnesota Wilderness (NAHL)	—
18	(Canada)	Tyler Wallace	Freshman	F	6' 2" (1.88 m)	188 lb (85 kg)	2002-05-19	Calgary, Alberta	Blackfalds Bulldogs (AJHL)	—
19	(United States)	Drew Vieten	Sophomore	F	6' 1" (1.85 m)	190 lb (86 kg)	2001-01-10	Calabasas, California	Wichita Falls Warriors (NAHL)	—
20	(United States)	Christian Gorsack	Senior	F	5' 11" (1.8 m)	183 lb (83 kg)	2000-06-08	Jeannette, Pennsylvania	Johnstown Tomahawks (NAHL)	—
21	(United States)	Shane Ott (A)	Junior	F	6' 1" (1.85 m)	181 lb (82 kg)	2000-07-21	Centennial, Colorado	Janesville Jets (NAHL)	—
22	(Canada)	Lane Brockhoff	Junior	D	6' 1" (1.85 m)	207 lb (94 kg)	2000-04-11	Edberg, Alberta	Camrose Kodiaks (AJHL)	—
23	(Norway)	Lars Rødne	Junior	F	6' 0" (1.83 m)	181 lb (82 kg)	2000-07-22	Stavanager, Norway	Bismarck Bobcats (NAHL)	—
24	(Czech Republic)	Josef Myšák	Senior	D	6' 3" (1.91 m)	215 lb (98 kg)	1999-09-08	Litvínov, Czech Republic	Austin Bruins (NAHL)	—
25	(United States)	Johnny Wescoe	Sophomore	F	5' 8" (1.73 m)	150 lb (68 kg)	2001-01-06	Mechanicsburg, Pennsylvania	Rockets Hockey Club (NCDC)	—
26	(United States)	Alex Murray	Junior	D	5' 11" (1.8 m)	183 lb (83 kg)	2000-03-17	Glenview, Illinois	Miami (NCHC)	—
27	(Norway)	Aron Jessli	Freshman	F	6' 1" (1.85 m)	185 lb (84 kg)	2004-10-29	Lørenskog, Norway	Pickering Panthers (OJHL)	—
28	(Canada)	Ethan Lund	Sophomore	D	5' 10" (1.78 m)	185 lb (84 kg)	2001-03-16	Calgary, Alberta	Brooks Bandits (AJHL)	—
29	(United States)	David Posma	Sophomore	D	6' 0" (1.83 m)	170 lb (77 kg)	2003-08-27	Pomona, New York	New Jersey Titans (NAHL)	—
30	(United States)	Mitchell Day	Freshman	G	5' 10" (1.78 m)	175 lb (79 kg)	2002-01-18	St. Louis, Missouri	North Iowa Bulls (NAHL)	—
31	(United States)	Jarrett Fiske	Graduate	G	6' 4" (1.93 m)	195 lb (88 kg)	1999-05-28	Erie, Pennsylvania	American International (AHA)	—
34	(Canada)	Noah Hackett	Sophomore	F	6' 1" (1.85 m)	174 lb (79 kg)	2001-12-11	Ponoka, Alberta	Brooks Bandits (AJHL)	—
39	(United States)	Ryan Ouellette	Junior	G	6' 0" (1.83 m)	185 lb (84 kg)	2000-12-06	Colorado Springs, Colorado	Wisconsin–Eau Claire (WIAC)	—

== Standings ==
2023–24 Atlantic Hockey Standings
	Conference record										Overall record					
	GP	W	L	T	OW	OL	SW	PTS	GF	GA	GP	W	L	T	GF	GA
#17 RIT †*	26	18	7	1	3	2	0	54	102	64	40	27	11	2	156	96
Holy Cross	26	13	10	3	0	3	1	46	78	62	39	21	14	4	116	93
Sacred Heart	26	14	10	2	2	2	1	45	75	70	36	14	19	3	91	113
Air Force	26	15	10	1	3	0	1	44	88	75	38	18	19	1	115	119
American International	26	12	10	4	1	1	2	42	79	68	40	20	16	4	119	111
Bentley	26	12	12	2	1	2	2	41	69	58	35	16	17	2	95	82
Niagara	26	13	10	3	3	1	1	41	78	79	39	18	18	3	111	122
Canisius	26	10	12	4	2	1	0	33	73	87	37	12	21	4	103	126
Mercyhurst	26	7	15	4	0	1	4	30	77	91	35	9	22	4	98	126
Army	26	8	16	2	0	1	1	28	66	96	35	10	23	2	93	139
Robert Morris	26	7	17	2	0	1	1	25	60	95	39	11	25	3	94	142
Championship: March 23, 2024 † indicates conference regular season champion (DeGregorio Trophy) * indicates conference tournament champion (Riley Trophy); Rankings: USCHO.com Top 20 Poll

== Schedule and results ==
Date	Time	Opponent^{#}	Rank^{#}	Site	TV	Decision	Result	Attendance	Record
Exhibition
October 7	5:00 pm	Royal Military College*		Dwyer Arena • Lewiston, New York (Exhibition)	FloHockey	Ouellette	W 8–3	461	
October 8	3:00 pm	Canisius*		Dwyer Arena • Lewiston, New York (Rivalry)	FloHockey	Ouellette	L 2–5	28	
Regular Season
October 13	8:07 pm	at Omaha*		Baxter Arena • Omaha, Nebraska		Fiske	L 1–8	6,393	0–1–0
October 14	8:07 pm	at Omaha*		Baxter Arena • Omaha, Nebraska		Ouellette	L 1–2	6,240	0–2–0
October 21	7:00 pm	Mercyhurst		Dwyer Arena • Lewiston, New York	FloHockey	Ouellette	T 3–3 ^{SOL}	988	0–2–1 (0–0–1)
October 27	7:00 pm	at Sacred Heart		Martire Family Arena • Fairfield, Connecticut	FloHockey	Ouellette	W 4–3 ^{OT}	2,852	1–2–1 (1–0–1)
October 28	6:00 pm	at Sacred Heart		Martire Family Arena • Fairfield, Connecticut	FloHockey	Ouellette	L 1–4	2,538	1–3–1 (1–1–1)
November 3	7:00 pm	Air Force		Dwyer Arena • Lewiston, New York	FloHockey	Ouellette	L 2–3 ^{OT}	637	1–4–1 (1–2–1)
November 4	7:00 pm	Air Force		Dwyer Arena • Lewiston, New York	FloHockey	Fiske	W 4–3	755	2–4–1 (2–2–1)
November 10	7:00 pm	at Bentley		Bentley Arena • Waltham, Massachusetts	FloHockey	Ouellette	L 2–6	1,346	2–5–1 (2–3–1)
November 11	4:00 pm	at Bentley		Bentley Arena • Waltham, Massachusetts	FloHockey	Fiske	L 1–2	890	2–6–1 (2–4–1)
November 17	7:00 pm	Robert Morris		Dwyer Arena • Lewiston, New York	FloHockey	Fiske	W 6–2	1,066	3–6–1 (3–4–1)
November 18	7:00 pm	at Robert Morris		Clearview Arena • Neville Township, Pennsylvania	FloHockey	Fiske	W 4–1	667	4–6–1 (4–4–1)
November 24	7:00 pm	at Colgate*		Class of 1965 Arena • Hamilton, New York	ESPN+	Fiske	W 5–2	804	5–6–1
November 25	7:00 pm	at Colgate*		Class of 1965 Arena • Hamilton, New York	ESPN+	Ouellette	L 1–2	603	5–7–1
December 1	7:00 pm	at Holy Cross		Hart Center • Worcester, Massachusetts	FloHockey	Fiske	W 3–2 ^{OT}	737	6–7–1 (5–4–1)
December 2	4:00 pm	at Holy Cross		Hart Center • Worcester, Massachusetts	FloHockey	Fiske	L 1–4	807	6–8–1 (5–5–1)
December 7	7:00 pm	at Robert Morris		Clearview Arena • Neville Township, Pennsylvania	FloHockey, SNP	Fiske	L 1–4	514	6–9–1 (5–6–1)
December 9	7:00 pm	Robert Morris		Dwyer Arena • Lewiston, New York	FloHockey	Ouellette	L 1–3	693	6–10–1 (5–7–1)
December 29	7:00 pm	Miami*		Dwyer Arena • Lewiston, New York	FloHockey	Fiske	W 4–1	605	7–10–1
December 30	5:00 pm	Miami*		Dwyer Arena • Lewiston, New York	FloHockey	Fiske	L 0–3	733	7–11–1
January 5	9:00 pm	at #6 Denver*		Magness Arena • Denver, Colorado		Fiske	L 2–5	5,854	7–12–1
January 6	8:00 pm	at #6 Denver*		Magness Arena • Denver, Colorado		Day	L 1–6	6,255	7–13–1
January 11	7:00 pm	#19 RIT		Dwyer Arena • Lewiston, New York	FloHockey	Fiske	W 3–1	754	8–13–1 (6–7–1)
January 19	7:00 pm	at Canisius		LECOM Harborcenter • Buffalo, New York (Rivalry)	FloHockey	Fiske	W 4–2	1,161	9–13–1 (7–7–1)
January 20	7:00 pm	Canisius		Dwyer Arena • Lewiston, New York (Rivalry)	FloHockey	Fiske	W 6–4	902	10–13–1 (8–7–1)
January 25	7:00 pm	at USNTDP*		USA Hockey Arena • Plymouth, Michigan (Exhibition)		Day	T 2–2 ^{SOW}	724	
February 1	7:00 pm	#19 RIT		Dwyer Arena • Lewiston, New York	FloHockey	Fiske	T 4–4 ^{SOW}	807	10–13–2 (8–7–2)
February 3	5:05 pm	at #19 RIT		Gene Polisseni Center • Henrietta, New York	FloHockey	Fiske	L 2–4	4,123	10–14–2 (8–8–2)
February 6	6:00 pm	at Canisius		LECOM Harborcenter • Buffalo, New York (Rivalry)	FloHockey	Day	W 3–2 ^{OT}	792	11–14–2 (9–8–2)
February 9	7:00 pm	American International		Dwyer Arena • Lewiston, New York	FloHockey	Fiske	W 4–2	651	12–14–2 (10–8–2)
February 10	7:00 pm	American International		Dwyer Arena • Lewiston, New York	FloHockey	Fiske	T 4–4 ^{SOL}	749	12–14–3 (10–8–3)
February 16	7:00 pm	Army		Dwyer Arena • Lewiston, New York	FloHockey	Fiske	W 6–3	1,002	13–14–3 (11–8–3)
February 17	5:00 pm	Army		Dwyer Arena • Lewiston, New York	FloHockey	Fiske	L 0–3	1,004	13–15–3 (11–9–3)
February 20	7:00 pm	at Mercyhurst		Mercyhurst Ice Center • Erie, Pennsylvania	FloHockey	Fiske	W 4–1	924	14–15–3 (12–9–3)
February 22	7:00 pm	Mercyhurst		Dwyer Arena • Lewiston, New York	FloHockey	Fiske	L 1–6	719	14–16–3 (12–10–3)
February 24	7:00 pm	at Mercyhurst		Mercyhurst Ice Center • Erie, Pennsylvania	FloHockey	Fiske	W 4–3	1,002	15–16–3 (13–10–3)
Atlantic Hockey Tournament
March 2	7:00 pm	Army*		Dwyer Arena • Lewiston, New York (First Round)	FloHockey	Fiske	W 4–1	710	16–16–3
March 8	7:00 pm	at Sacred Heart*		Martire Family Arena • Fairfield, Connecticut (Quarterfinal Game 1)	FloHockey	Fiske	W 6–3	2,354	17–16–3
March 9	7:00 pm	at Sacred Heart*		Martire Family Arena • Fairfield, Connecticut (Quarterfinal Game 2)	FloHockey	Fiske	W 5–1	2,639	18–16–3
March 15	7:05 pm	at #19 RIT*		Gene Polisseni Center • Henrietta, New York (Semifinal Game 1)	FloHockey	Fiske	L 1–4	2,564	18–17–3
March 16	7:05 pm	at #19 RIT*		Gene Polisseni Center • Henrietta, New York (Semifinal Game 2)	FloHockey	Fiske	L 2–5	3,284	18–18–3
*Non-conference game. ^{#}Rankings from USCHO.com Poll. All times are in Eastern Time. Source:

== Scoring statistics ==
Name	Position	Games	Goals	Assists	Points	PIM
Carter Randklev	F	37	11	20	31	39
Tyler Wallace	C	39	13	17	30	17
Jay Ahearn	F	34	10	16	26	26
Jack Richard	F	34	10	11	21	33
Gļebs Prohorenkovs	F	39	9	12	21	21
Lars Rødne	LW	34	8	12	20	4
Shane Ott	F	38	5	15	20	25
Luke Mylymok	C/W	38	9	7	16	20
Olivier Gauthier	LW	39	4	10	14	33
Alex Murray	D	22	1	12	13	10
Noah Carlin	D	27	3	9	12	10
Josef Myšák	D	37	2	10	12	28
Connor Mylymok	LW	37	6	5	11	61
Noah Hackett	F	29	2	6	8	0
Jonathan Ziskie	D	27	2	6	8	2
Lane Brockhoff	D	37	2	6	8	54
Johnny Wescoe	F	19	4	1	5	6
Cole Mickel	D	28	2	3	5	4
Ethan Lund	D	33	2	3	5	8
Drew Vieten	F	21	3	1	4	21
Aron Jessli	LW	28	1	3	4	0
David Posma	D	15	1	2	3	2
Jarrett Fiske	G	29	0	3	3	0
Christian Gorscak	F	23	1	1	2	4
Max Ruoho	D	11	0	1	1	2
Jaedon Leslie	F	14	0	1	1	8
Mitchell Day	G	6	0	0	0	0
Ryan Ouellette	G	8	0	0	0	0
Total			111	193	304	438

== Goaltending statistics ==
Name	Games	Minutes	Wins	Losses	Ties	Goals against	Saves	Shut outs	SV %	GAA
Jarrett Fiske	29	1673:26	16	11	2	76	788	0	.912	2.72
Ryan Ouellette	8	436:34	1	6	1	20	188	0	.904	2.75
Mitchell Day	6	221:47	1	1	0	15	113	0	.883	4.06
Empty Net	-	29:31	-	-	-	11	-	-	-	-
Total	39	2361:18	18	18	3	122	1089	0	.899	3.10

== Rankings ==
Poll	Week																										
Poll	Pre	1	2	3	4	5	6	7	8	9	10	11	12	13	14	15	16	17	18	19	20	21	22	23	24	25	26 (Final)
USCHO.com	NR	NR	NR	NR	NR	NR	NR	NR	NR	NR	NR	–	NR	NR	NR	NR	NR	NR	NR	NR	NR	NR	NR	NR	NR	–	NR
USA Hockey	NR	NR	NR	NR	NR	NR	NR	NR	NR	NR	NR	NR	–	NR	NR	NR	NR	NR	NR	NR	NR	NR	NR	NR	NR	NR	NR

Note: USCHO did not release a poll in weeks 11 and 25.
Note: USA Hockey did not release a poll in week 12.

== 2024 NHL entry draft ==
Round	Pick	Player	NHL team
4	106	Trevor Hoskin ^{†}	Calgary Flames

† incoming freshman
