= Air Force–Army men's ice hockey rivalry =

College sports rivalry

- Air Force Falcons Army Black Knights
- Sport: Ice hockey
- First meeting: 23 January 1976; Army 3, Air Force 0
- Latest meeting: 15 February 2025; Army 4, Air Force 4 (SO)
- Next meeting: TBA
- Stadiums: Cadet Ice Arena; Tate Rink

Statistics
- Total meetings: 93
- All-time series: Air Force leads, 53–30–10 (.624)
- Largest victory: Air Force, 9–2 (24 January 1976); Army, 7–0 (17 February 1996); Air Force, 8–1 (19 January 2024)
- Longest win streak: Air Force, 5 (three times)
- Longest unbeaten streak: Air Force, 10 (20 January 2012 – 16 January 2016)
- Current unbeaten streak: Army, 4

The Air Force–Army men's ice hockey rivalry is a college ice hockey rivalry between the Air Force Falcons men's ice hockey and Army Black Knights men's ice hockey programs. The first official meeting between the two occurred on January 26, 1976 but didn't become an annual event until 1989.

== History ==
Army was one of the first college teams in the country, playing their first games in 1904. Air Force didn't start play until more than 60 years later but, due to the vast distance between the two campuses, the teams didn't play one another for several seasons. When the NCAA reorganized into numerical divisions in 1973, Army was dropped down to Division II in part because they still used an open-air rink as their home facility. The Smith Rink served as Army's home from 1930 to 1985 but, once the program began to build the more modern Tate Rink, the program was allowed back into top division. Army then played as a part-time member of ECAC Hockey until the late 1980s, after which, the team played as an independent. This coincided with Army and Air Force beginning an annual rivalry.

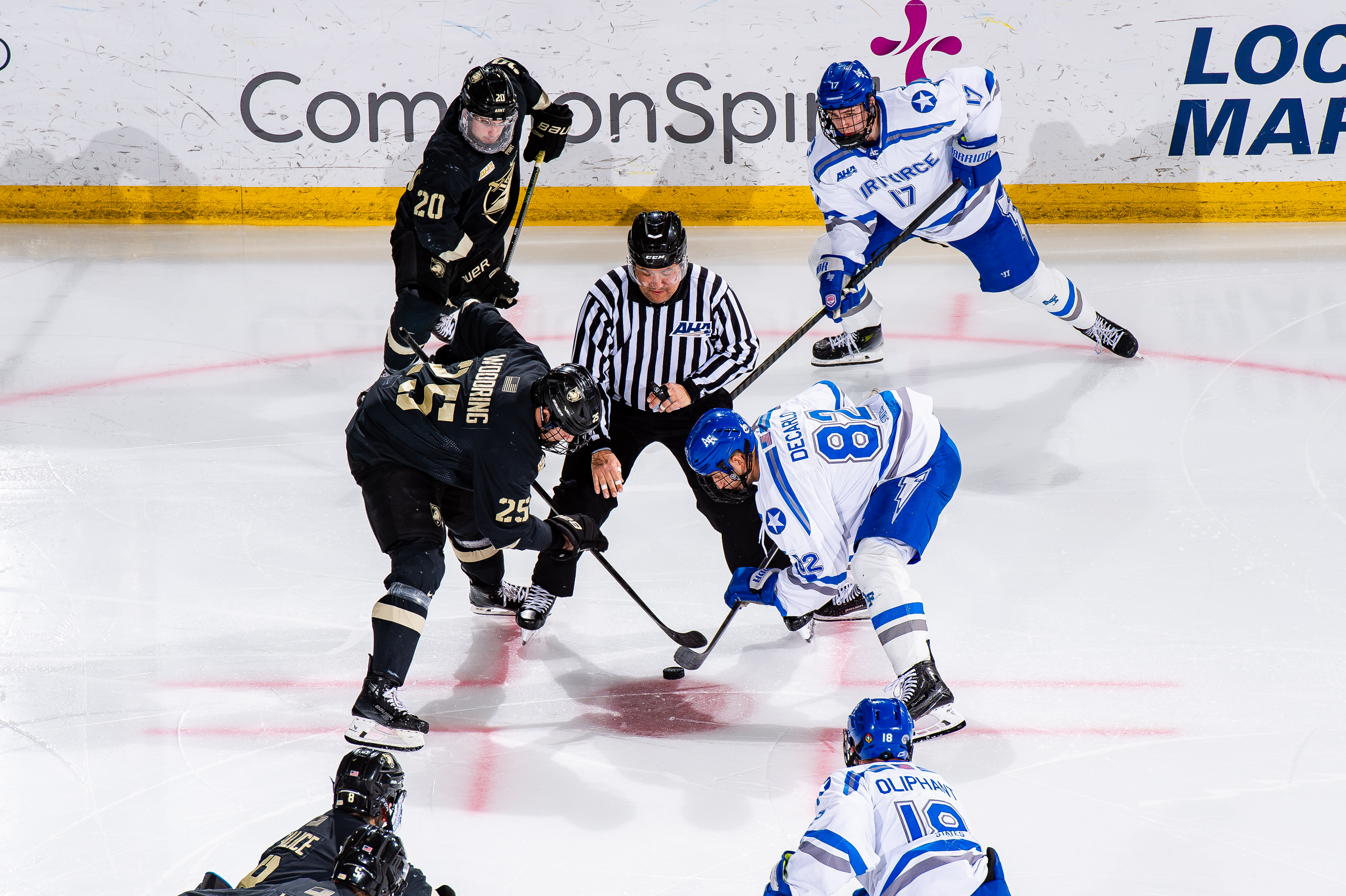
A face-off between Army (left) and Air Force (right) during a 2025 game at Cadet Ice Arena

For the first decade of play between the two service academies, the teams alternated hosting duties. That trend continued once they both joined College Hockey America in 2000, however, Army left after just one season to join the MAAC, an east coast conference. Air Force remained with the CHA for several years before following in Army's footsteps, joining the MAAC successor, Atlantic Hockey in 2007. Over the span of 15 years, Air Force and Army have met 5 times in the conference tournament with the Falcons winning every series.

== Game results ==
Full game results for the rivalry, with rankings beginning in the 1998–99 season.

Air Force victories	Army victories	Tie games

No.	Date	Location	Winning team		Losing team		Notes
1	23 January 1976	Smith Rink; West Point, NY	Army	3	Air Force	0	
2	24 January 1976	Smith Rink; West Point, NY	Air Force	9	Army	2	
3	28 January 1977	Cadet Ice Arena; Colorado Springs, CO	Air Force	6	Army	3	
4	29 January 1977	Cadet Ice Arena; Colorado Springs, CO	Air Force	6	Army	2	
5	27 October 1989	Tate Rink; West Point, NY	Army	4	Air Force	2	
6	28 October 1989	Tate Rink; West Point, NY	Army	4	Air Force	0	
7	26 October 1990	Cadet Ice Arena; Colorado Springs, CO	Air Force	5	Army	2	
8	27 October 1990	Cadet Ice Arena; Colorado Springs, CO	Tie	3	Tie	3	(OT)
9	7 February 1992	Tate Rink; West Point, NY	Air Force	7	Army	3	
10	8 February 1992	Tate Rink; West Point, NY	Army	5	Air Force	4	
11	30 December 1992	DU Arena; Denver, CO	Army	5	Air Force	3	Denver Cup consolation game
12	29 January 1993	Cadet Ice Arena; Colorado Springs, CO	Air Force	5	Army	2	
13	30 January 1993	Cadet Ice Arena; Colorado Springs, CO	Air Force	4	Army	1	
14	21 January 1994	Tate Rink; West Point, NY	Air Force	7	Army	3	
15	22 January 1994	Tate Rink; West Point, NY	Army	6	Air Force	4	
16	17 February 1995	Cadet Ice Arena; Colorado Springs, CO	Air Force	5	Army	2	
17	18 February 1995	Cadet Ice Arena; Colorado Springs, CO	Air Force	9	Army	6	
18	16 February 1996	Tate Rink; West Point, NY	Army	3	Air Force	1	
19	17 February 1996	Tate Rink; West Point, NY	Army	7	Air Force	0	
20	28 February 1997	Cadet Ice Arena; Colorado Springs, CO	Army	6	Air Force	3	
21	1 March 1997	Cadet Ice Arena; Colorado Springs, CO	Air Force	5	Army	2	
22	27 February 1998	Tate Rink; West Point, NY	Air Force	3	Army	2	
23	28 February 1998	Tate Rink; West Point, NY	Air Force	5	Army	3	
24	3 January 1999	DECC; Duluth, MN	Air Force	2	Army	1	Silverado Shootout consolation game
25	27 February 1999	Cadet Ice Arena; Colorado Springs, CO	Air Force	4	Army	3	
26	28 February 1999	Cadet Ice Arena; Colorado Springs, CO	Tie	3	Tie	3	(OT)
27	3 March 2000	Tate Rink; West Point, NY	Air Force	4	Army	2	CHA play begins
28	4 March 2000	Tate Rink; West Point, NY	Air Force	3	Army	0	CHA play ends
29	2 March 2001	Cadet Ice Arena; Colorado Springs, CO	Army	5	Air Force	2	
30	3 March 2001	Cadet Ice Arena; Colorado Springs, CO	Air Force	4	Army	3	
31	7 December 2001	Tate Rink; West Point, NY	Air Force	4	Army	2	
32	8 December 2001	Tate Rink; West Point, NY	Air Force	5	Army	4	
33	18 January 2003	Cadet Ice Arena; Colorado Springs, CO	Army	2	Air Force	1	
34	19 January 2003	Cadet Ice Arena; Colorado Springs, CO	Army	2	Air Force	1	
35	16 January 2004	Tate Rink; West Point, NY	Army	4	Air Force	3	
36	17 January 2004	Tate Rink; West Point, NY	Air Force	3	Army	0	
37	14 January 2005	Cadet Ice Arena; Colorado Springs, CO	Air Force	5	Army	2	
38	15 January 2005	Cadet Ice Arena; Colorado Springs, CO	Air Force	2	Army	1	
39	11 November 2005	Tate Rink; West Point, NY	Army	3	Air Force	0	
40	12 November 2005	Tate Rink; West Point, NY	Army	4	Air Force	3	(OT)
41	19 January 2007	Cadet Ice Arena; Colorado Springs, CO	Air Force	4	Army	1	AHA play begins
42	20 January 2007	Cadet Ice Arena; Colorado Springs, CO	Army	2	Air Force	0	
43	17 March 2007	Blue Cross Arena; Rochester, NY	Air Force	6	Army	1	Atlantic Hockey Championship
44	25 January 2008	Tate Rink; West Point, NY	Army	2	Air Force	1	
45	27 January 2008	Tate Rink; West Point, NY	Army	2	Air Force	1	
46	23 January 2009	Cadet Ice Arena; Colorado Springs, CO	Air Force	5	Army	1	
47	24 January 2009	Cadet Ice Arena; Colorado Springs, CO	Air Force	3	Army	2	
48	29 January 2010	Tate Rink; West Point, NY	Army	4	Air Force	2	
49	30 January 2010	Tate Rink; West Point, NY	Tie	3	Tie	3	(OT)
50	12 March 2010	Cadet Ice Arena; Colorado Springs, CO	Air Force	3	Army	0	Atlantic Hockey Quarterfinals game 1
51	13 March 2010	Cadet Ice Arena; Colorado Springs, CO	Air Force	4	Army	2	Atlantic Hockey Quarterfinals game 2
52	14 January 2011	Cadet Ice Arena; Colorado Springs, CO	Air Force	5	Army	1	
53	15 January 2011	Cadet Ice Arena; Colorado Springs, CO	Army	5	Air Force	4	
54	20 January 2012	Tate Rink; West Point, NY	Tie	3	Tie	3	(OT)
55	21 January 2012	Tate Rink; West Point, NY	Air Force	4	Army	2	
56	11 January 2013	Cadet Ice Arena; Colorado Springs, CO	Air Force	4	Army	1	
57	12 January 2013	Cadet Ice Arena; Colorado Springs, CO	Tie	3	Tie	3	
58	10 January 2014	Tate Rink; West Point, NY	Air Force	3	Army	1	
59	11 January 2014	Tate Rink; West Point, NY	Air Force	4	Army	2	
60	16 January 2015	Cadet Ice Arena; Colorado Springs, CO	Air Force	4	Army	3	
61	17 January 2015	Cadet Ice Arena; Colorado Springs, CO	Air Force	3	Army	1	
62	15 January 2016	Tate Rink; West Point, NY	Air Force	1	Army	0	
63	16 January 2016	Tate Rink; West Point, NY	Tie	1	Tie	1	(OT)
64	4 November 2016	Tate Rink; West Point, NY	Army	4	Air Force	2	
65	5 November 2016	Tate Rink; West Point, NY	Air Force	3	Army	1	
66	27 January 2017	Cadet Ice Arena; Colorado Springs, CO	Air Force	3	Army	1	
67	28 January 2017	Cadet Ice Arena; Colorado Springs, CO	Air Force	3	Army	2	
68	17 March 2017	Blue Cross Arena; Rochester, NY	No. 17 Air Force	1	Army	0	Atlantic Hockey Semifinal
69	3 November 2017	Cadet Ice Arena; Colorado Springs, CO	Army	3	No. 19 Air Force	2	
70	4 November 2017	Cadet Ice Arena; Colorado Springs, CO	Army	2	No. 19 Air Force	0	
71	9 March 2018	Tate Rink; West Point, NY	Air Force	5	Army	3	Atlantic Hockey Quarterfinals game 1
72	10 March 2018	Tate Rink; West Point, NY	Army	1	Air Force	0	(OT); Atlantic Hockey Quarterfinals game 2
73	11 March 2018	Tate Rink; West Point, NY	Air Force	1	Army	0	Atlantic Hockey Quarterfinals game 3
74	2 November 2018	Tate Rink; West Point, NY	Air Force	4	Army	2	
75	3 November 2018	Tate Rink; West Point, NY	Air Force	4	Army	2	
76	11 January 2019	Cadet Ice Arena; Colorado Springs, CO	Tie	2	Tie	2	(OT)
77	12 January 2019	Cadet Ice Arena; Colorado Springs, CO	Tie	2	Tie	2	(OT)
78	10 January 2020	Tate Rink; West Point, NY	Tie	3	Tie	3	(SOL)
79	11 January 2020	Tate Rink; West Point, NY	Army	5	Air Force	2	
80	28 January 2022	Cadet Ice Arena; Colorado Springs, CO	Army	8	Air Force	3	
81	29 January 2022	Cadet Ice Arena; Colorado Springs, CO	Air Force	3	Army	2	(OT)
82	11 March 2022	Tate Rink; West Point, NY	Air Force	5	Army	4	(OT); Atlantic Hockey Quarterfinals game 1
83	12 March 2022	Tate Rink; West Point, NY	Air Force	3	Army	2	(OT); Atlantic Hockey Quarterfinals game 2
84	27 January 2023	Tate Rink; West Point, NY	Army	3	Air Force	1	
85	28 January 2023	Tate Rink; West Point, NY	Air Force	6	Army	4	
86	10 November 2023	Cadet Ice Arena; Colorado Springs, CO	Air Force	4	Army	3	(OT)
87	11 November 2023	Cadet Ice Arena; Colorado Springs, CO	Air Force	4	Army	0	
88	19 January 2024	Tate Rink; West Point, NY	Air Force	8	Army	1	
89	20 January 2024	Tate Rink; West Point, NY	Air Force	7	Army	6	
90	17 January 2025	Tate Rink; West Point, NY	Army	3	Air Force	2	
91	18 January 2025	Tate Rink; West Point, NY	Army	4	Air Force	3	(OT)
92	14 February 2025	Cadet Ice Arena; Colorado Springs, CO	Army	2	Air Force	1	
93	15 February 2025	Cadet Ice Arena; Colorado Springs, CO	Tie	4	Tie	4	(SOL)
Series: Air Force leads 53–30–10

== Series facts ==
Statistic	Air Force	Army
Games played	93	
Wins	53	30
Home wins	26	19
Road wins	24	10
Neutral site wins	3	1
Goals scored	307	242
Most goals scored in a game by one team	9 (24 January 1976, 18 February 1995)	8 (22 January 2022)
Most goals in a game by both teams	15 (18 February 1995 – Air Force 9, Army 6)	
Fewest goals in a game by both teams	1 (15 January 2016, 17 March 2017, 10 March 2018, 11 March 2018)	
Fewest goals scored in a game by one team in a win	1 (15 January 2016, 17 March 2017, 11 March 2018)	1 (10 March 2018)
Most goals scored in a game by one team in a loss	4 (8 February 1992, 22 January 1994, 15 January 2011)	6 (18 February 1995, 20 January 2024)
Largest margin of victory	7 (24 January 1976, 19 January 2024)	7 (17 February 1996)
Longest winning streak	5 (1 March 1997 – 27 February 1999), (10 January 2014 – 15 January 2016) (28 January 2023 – 20 January 2024)	3 (16 February 1996 – 28 February 1997), (18 January 2003 – 16 January 2004) (17 January 2025 – 14 February 2025)
Longest unbeaten streak	10 (20 January 2012 – 16 January 2016)	5 (11 January 2019 – 28 January 2022)
