= 2023–24 NCAA Division I men's ice hockey rankings =

- NCAA tournament: 2024
- NCAA champion: Denver
- Preseason No. 1 (USCHO): Boston University
- Preseason No. 1 (USA Hockey): Boston University
- NCAA Division I men's ice hockey rankings

Two human polls made up the 2023–24 NCAA Division I men's ice hockey rankings, the USCHO.com/CBS College Sports poll and the USA Hockey/The Rink Live poll. As the 2023–24 season progressed, rankings were updated weekly.

== Legend ==
| | Increase in ranking |
| | Decrease in ranking |
| | Not ranked previous week |
| Italics | Number of first place votes |
| (#-#) | Win–loss–tie record |
| т | Tied with team above or below also with this symbol |

== USCHO ==
| | Preseason Sep 25 | Week 1 Oct 9 | Week 2 Oct 16 | Week 3 Oct 23 | Week 4 Oct 30 | Week 5 Nov 6 | Week 6 Nov 13 | Week 7 Nov 20 | Week 8 Nov 27 | Week 9 Dec 4 | Week 10 Dec 11 | Week 12 Jan 2 | Week 13 Jan 8 | Week 14 Jan 15 | Week 15 Jan 22 | Week 16 Jan 29 | Week 17 Feb 5 | Week 18 Feb 12 | Week 19 Feb 19 | Week 20 Feb 26 | Week 21 Mar 4 | Week 22 Mar 11 | Week 23 Mar 18 | Week 24 Mar 25 | Final Apr 15 | |
|---|---|---|---|---|---|---|---|---|---|---|---|---|---|---|---|---|---|---|---|---|---|---|---|---|---|---|
| 1. | Boston University (17) | Boston University (1–0–0) (26) | Minnesota (2–0–0) (33) | Minnesota (3–1–0) (42) | Boston College (5–1–0) (36) | Boston College (7–1–0) (30) | Wisconsin (9–1–0) (32) | North Dakota (9–2–1) (33) | Boston College (11–2–1) (18) | North Dakota (12–3–1) (33) | Boston College (13–3–1) (34) | Boston College (13–3–1) (34) | Boston College (13–3–1) (37) | Boston University (14–4–1) (32) | Boston University (16–4–1) (40) | Boston College (18–4–1) (47) | Boston College (19–4–1) (48) | Boston College (20–5–1) (24) | Boston College (23–5–1) (50) | Boston College (25–5–1) (50) | Boston College (27–5–1) (50) | Boston College (28–5–1) (50) | Boston College (29–5–1) (50) | Boston College (31–5–1) (50) | Denver (32–9–3) (50) | 1. |
| 2. | Quinnipiac (22) | Minnesota (0–0–0) (18) | Denver (2–0–0) (10) | Denver (3–1–0) (6) | Denver (4–1–1) (5) | Denver (6–1–1) (5) | North Dakota (7–2–1) (9) | Boston College (9–2–1) (6) | North Dakota (11–2–1) (31) | Boston College (12–3–1) (4) т | Boston University (11–4–1) (8) | Boston University (12–4–1) (9) | Boston University (12–4–1) (6) | Boston College (14–4–1) (12) | Boston College (16–4–1) (6) | North Dakota (18–6–2) (2) | North Dakota (20–6–2) (2) | North Dakota (20–6–2) (14) | Boston University (20–8–2) | Boston University (22–8–2) | Boston University (22–8–2) | Boston University (24–8–2) | Boston University (25–8–2) | Boston University (26–9–2) | Boston College (34–6–1) | 2. |
| 3. | Minnesota (10) | Denver (2–0–0) (4) | Boston College (2–0–0) (4) | Boston College (3–1–0) (1) | North Dakota (4–1–1) (1) | Wisconsin (9–1–0) (12) | Denver (7–2–1) (3) | Quinnipiac (9–3–1) (8) | Denver (10–3–1) (1) | Boston University (11–4–1) (8) т | Quinnipiac (12–4–1) (5) | Quinnipiac (13–4–1) (2) | Wisconsin (18–4–0) (5) | Quinnipiac (15–4–2) (2) | Wisconsin (19–4–1) (1) | Boston University (16–6–1) | Boston University (17–7–1) | Boston University (19–7–1) (11) | Denver (20–8–2) | North Dakota (22–8–2) | North Dakota (24–8–2) | Denver (24–9–3) | Denver (26–9–3) | Denver (28–9–3) | Boston University (28–10–2) | 3. |
| 4. | Denver | Boston College (1–0–0) (2) | Quinnipiac (2–1–0) (2) | North Dakota (3–1–0) | Michigan (5–2–1) | North Dakota (5–2–1) | Boston College (7–2–1) (2) | Denver (8–3–1) (2) | Boston University (9–4–1) | Denver (11–4–1) (2) | North Dakota (12–5–1) | North Dakota (12–5–1) | North Dakota (14–5–1) | Wisconsin (19–4–1) (1) | Denver (17–5–2) (1) | Wisconsin (20–5–1) | Wisconsin (20–6–2) | Wisconsin (22–6–2) (1) | Michigan State (20–7–3) т | Wisconsin (24–8–2) | Denver (23–8–3) | Michigan State (22–9–3) | North Dakota (26–10–2) | Michigan State (24–9–3) | Michigan (23–15–3) | 4. |
| 5. | Michigan (1) | Quinnipiac (0–1–0) | North Dakota (2–0–0) | Quinnipiac (3–2–0) | Wisconsin (7–1–0) (5) | Providence (6–1–2) (1) | Providence (8–1–2) (3) | Boston University (8–3–1) (1) | Quinnipiac (9–4–1) | Quinnipiac (11–4–1) (3) | Denver (12–5–1) | Wisconsin (16–4–0) (1) | Quinnipiac (13–4–2) | Denver (15–5–2) (1) | North Dakota (16–6–2) (1) | Denver (17–7–2) | Quinnipiac (19–6–2) | Denver (18–8–2) | North Dakota (20–8–2) т | Denver (21–8–3) | Wisconsin (25–9–2) | North Dakota (24–10–2) | Michigan State (23–9–3) | North Dakota (26–11–2) | Michigan State (25–10–3) | 5. |
| 6. | Boston College | Michigan (1–1–0) | Boston University (1–1–0) (1) | Michigan (3–2–1) | Minnesota (3–3–0) | Minnesota (4–3–1) | Minnesota (5–3–2) | Wisconsin (9–3–0) | Wisconsin (10–4–0) | Wisconsin (12–4–0) | Wisconsin (14–4–0) (1) | Denver (12–5–1) | Denver (14–5–1) | North Dakota (15–6–1) | Maine (16–4–2) (1) | Maine (16–4–2) (1) | Denver (18–8–2) | Michigan State (20–7–3) | Wisconsin (22–8–2) | Michigan State (21–8–3) | Michigan State (22–9–3) | Minnesota (22–9–5) | Quinnipiac (26–8–2) | Maine (23–11–2) | Quinnipiac (27–10–2) | 6. |
| 7. | North Dakota | North Dakota (0–0–0) | Michigan (2–2–0) | Providence (4–1–0) | Providence (5–1–1) (2) | Cornell (4–0–0) (2) | Quinnipiac (7–3–1) (1) | Michigan State (10–3–1) | Minnesota (7–4–3) | Michigan State (10–4–2) | Michigan State (12–4–2) | Maine (12–3–1) (2) | Maine (13–3–2) (2) | Michigan State (15–4–3) (1) | Quinnipiac (15–6–2) | Quinnipiac (17–6–2) | Maine (17–5–2) | Maine (18–6–2) | Quinnipiac (22–7–2) | Quinnipiac (23–7–2) | Quinnipiac (24–8–2) | Quinnipiac (24–8–2) | Maine (23–10–2) | Minnesota (22–10–5) | Minnesota (23–11–5) | 7. |
| 8. | St. Cloud State | Michigan State (2–0–0) | Michigan State (3–1–0) | Michigan State (5–1–0) | Quinnipiac (4–3–0) | Michigan (5–4–1) | Boston University (6–3–1) | Minnesota (6–4–2) | Michigan State (10–4–2) | Maine (8–3–1) | Maine (10–3–1) (2) | Michigan State (13–4–3) | Michigan State (13–4–3) | Maine (14–4–2) (1) | Michigan State (16–5–3) | Michigan State (17–6–3) | Minnesota (16–7–5) | Minnesota (18–7–5) | Minnesota (19–8–5) | Minnesota (19–8–5) | Minnesota (20–9–5) | Maine (22–10–2) | Minnesota (22–10–5) | Quinnipiac (26–9–2) | North Dakota (26–12–2) | 8. |
| 9. | Michigan State | Michigan Tech (0–0–1) | Western Michigan (1–0–1) | Boston University (2–2–0) | Boston University (3–2–1) | Boston University (4–3–1) | Maine (6–1–1) | Providence (8–3–2) | Providence (9–4–2) | Providence (9–4–2) | Minnesota (9–5–4) | Providence (10–5–2) | Providence (10–5–2) | Providence (11–6–2) | Minnesota (14–6–4) | Minnesota (15–7–4) | Michigan State (18–7–3) | Quinnipiac (20–7–2) | Maine (18–8–2) | Maine (19–9–2) | Maine (20–10–2) | Wisconsin (26–11–2) | Wisconsin (26–11–2) | Wisconsin (26–11–2) | Cornell (22–7–6) | 9. |
| 10. | Michigan Tech | St. Cloud State (1–1–0) | Providence (2–1–0) | Western Michigan (3–0–1) | Cornell (2–0–0) (1) | Quinnipiac (5–3–1) | Cornell (4–1–1) | Maine (6–3–1) | Massachusetts (9–3–1) | Minnesota (8–5–3) | Providence (9–5–2) | Minnesota (9–5–4) | Western Michigan (13–4–1) | Minnesota (12–6–4) | Providence (12–7–2) | Providence (14–7–2) | Providence (15–8–2) | Providence (16–9–2) | Colorado College (18–9–1) | Providence (17–10–3) | Colorado College (19–10–3) | Colorado College (20–11–3) | Michigan (21–13–3) | Michigan (21–14–3) | Maine (23–12–2) | 10. |
| 11. | Cornell | Cornell (0–0–0) | Cornell (0–0–0) | Minnesota Duluth (3–0–2) | Western Michigan (3–0–1) | Michigan State (7–3–0) | Michigan State (8–3–1) | Massachusetts (8–3–1) | Maine (6–3–1) | Massachusetts (9–4–1) | Massachusetts (11–4–1) | Western Michigan (11–4–1) | Arizona State (16–3–5) | Western Michigan (14–5–1) | Massachusetts (13–6–3) | Massachusetts (13–6–3) | Michigan (14–9–3) | Massachusetts (16–7–3) | Cornell (16–4–5) | Colorado College (18–10–2) | Providence (18–11–3) | Michigan (20–13–3) | Omaha (22–11–4) | Omaha (23–12–4) | Wisconsin (26–12–2) | 11. |
| 12. | Western Michigan | Western Michigan (0–0–0) | Penn State (3–0–0) | Cornell (0–0–0) | Michigan State (5–3–0) | Western Michigan (4–1–1) | Michigan (5–5–2) | New Hampshire (6–2–1) | Arizona State (10–3–1) | Arizona State (11–3–2) | Western Michigan (11–4–1) | Arizona State (14–3–5) | Minnesota (9–6–4) | Massachusetts (12–6–3) | Western Michigan (15–6–1) | Michigan (12–9–3) | Massachusetts (14–7–3) | Cornell (15–4–4) | Providence (16–10–3) | Western Michigan (18–11–1) | Massachusetts (19–10–3) | Omaha (20–10–4) | Colorado College (21–13–3) | Cornell (21–6–6) | Omaha (23–13–4) | 12. |
| 13. | Ohio State | Providence (1–1–0) | Ohio State (2–0–1) | Arizona State (4–0–0) | Ohio State (3–1–3) | Maine (5–1–0) | New Hampshire (4–2–1) | Arizona State (9–2–1) | Michigan (7–6–3) | Western Michigan (10–3–1) | Arizona State (11–3–4) | Massachusetts (11–5–2) | Massachusetts (11–5–3) | St. Cloud State (11–6–3) | Cornell (10–4–3) | Cornell (11–4–4) | Cornell (13–4–4) | Western Michigan (17–10–1) | Western Michigan (17–10–1) | Cornell (16–5–6) | Cornell (17–6–6) | Providence (18–12–4) | Massachusetts (20–12–3) | Massachusetts (20–13–3) | Massachusetts (20–14–3) | 13. |
| 14. | Merrimack | Ohio State (1–0–0) | Minnesota Duluth (1–0–2) | Wisconsin (5–1–0) | Minnesota Duluth (3–2–2) | Massachusetts (5–2–1) т | Arizona State (7–2–1) | Michigan (6–6–2) | Western Michigan (8–3–1) | Michigan (8–7–3) | St. Cloud State (9–5–2) | St. Cloud State (11–5–2) | St. Cloud State (11–5–2) | Cornell (8–4–3) | Michigan (11–8–3) | Colorado College (15–8–1) | Western Michigan (16–9–1) | Michigan (14–11–3) | Massachusetts (16–9–3) | Massachusetts (17–10–3) | Michigan (18–13–3) | Western Michigan (20–13–1) | Cornell (19–6–6) | Western Michigan (21–15–1) | Western Michigan (21–16–1) | 14. |
| 15. | Harvard | Merrimack (0–0–0) | Harvard (0–0–0) | Penn State (4–1–0) | New Hampshire (4–1–0) | New Hampshire (4–2–1) т | Massachusetts (6–3–1) | Western Michigan (6–3–1) | New Hampshire (7–3–1) | St. Cloud State (8–5–1) | Michigan (8–7–3) | Michigan (8–7–3) | Michigan (8–7–3) | Michigan (10–7–3) | St. Cloud State (11–7–4) | Western Michigan (15–8–1) | Colorado College (16–9–1) | Colorado College (16–9–1) | St. Cloud State (14–9–5) | St. Cloud State (15–10–5) | Western Michigan (18–13–1) | Cornell (17–6–6) | Western Michigan (21–15–1) | Colorado College (21–13–3) | Colorado College (21–13–3) | 15. |
| 16. | Penn State | Harvard (0–0–0) | Northeastern (2–0–0) | Ohio State (2–1–2) | Arizona State (4–1–1) | Arizona State (6–1–1) | Western Michigan (4–3–1) | Cornell (4–3–1) | Cornell (5–3–1) | New Hampshire (7–4–1) | New Hampshire (8–4–1) | Cornell (6–4–3) | New Hampshire (11–5–1) | Arizona State (16–5–5) | Colorado College (13–8–1) | St. Cloud State (11–8–5) | St. Cloud State (12–9–5) | St. Cloud State (14–9–5) | New Hampshire (16–11–1) | Michigan (17–12–3) | Omaha (18–10–4) | Massachusetts (19–12–3) | Providence (18–13–4) | Providence (18–13–4) | Providence (18–13–4) т | 16. |
| 17. | Minnesota Duluth | Minnesota Duluth (0–0–1) | Michigan Tech (0–1–2) | Harvard (0–0–0) | Penn State (5–2–0) | Penn State (5–2–2) | Notre Dame (6–3–2) | St. Cloud State (8–4–0) | St. Cloud State (8–5–1) | Penn State (9–5–3) | Cornell (6–4–1) | New Hampshire (9–5–1) | Colorado College (10–6–1) | New Hampshire (11–6–1) | New Hampshire (12–7–1) | Arizona State (17–6–5) | New Hampshire (14–9–1) | Arizona State (20–6–6) | Michigan (15–12–3) | New Hampshire (17–12–1) | St. Cloud State (15–12–5) | New Hampshire (19–14–1) | St. Cloud State (17–15–5) | RIT (27–10–2) | RIT (27–11–2) т | 17. |
| 18. | Providence | Penn State (1–0–0) | Arizona State (2–0–0) | Northeastern (2–0–0) | Massachusetts (4–2–1) | Minnesota Duluth (3–3–3) | Penn State (5–3–3) | Notre Dame (7–4–2) | Penn State (8–4–3) | Cornell (6–4–1) | RIT (11–5–0) | RIT (12–6–0) | Cornell (6–4–3) | Colorado College (11–8–1) | Arizona State (17–6–5) | New Hampshire (13–8–1) | Arizona State (18–6–6) | Omaha (15–10–3) | Arizona State (20–6–6) | Omaha (16–10–4) | New Hampshire (17–14–1) | St. Cloud State (15–14–5) | RIT (26–10–2) | St. Cloud State (17–16–5) | St. Cloud State (17–16–5) | 18. |
| 19. | Northeastern | Northeastern (1–0–0) | Minnesota State (2–0–0) | Massachusetts (4–1–0) | Harvard (0–0–1) | Ohio State (3–3–3) | St. Cloud State (6–4–0) | Penn State (6–4–3) | RIT (8–4–0) | RIT (10–4–0) | Penn State (9–7–3) | Penn State (9–7–3) | RIT (13–6–1) | Omaha (11–7–2) | RIT (15–8–1) | RIT (17–8–1) | Omaha (14–9–3) | New Hampshire (14–11–1) | Omaha (15–10–3) | RIT (22–10–2) | RIT (22–10–2) | RIT (24–10–2) | New Hampshire (20–15–1) | New Hampshire (20–15–1) | Michigan Tech (19–15–6) | 19. |
| 20. | Notre Dame | Connecticut (1–0–1) | St. Cloud State (1–3–0) | Omaha (2–0–0) | Maine (3–1–0) | RIT (6–2–0) | RIT (7–3–0) | RIT (7–3–0) | Omaha (8–3–1) | Notre Dame (8–6–2) | Colorado College (9–6–1) | Colorado College (9–6–1) | Penn State (10–7–3) | RIT (13–7–1) | Notre Dame (13–11–2) | Omaha (12–9–3) | RIT (18–8–2) | RIT (19–9–2) | RIT (20–10–2) | Arizona State (21–7–6) | Arizona State (23–7–6) | Arizona State (24–8–6) т Bemidji State (19–15–2) т | Bemidji State (20–15–2) | Michigan Tech (19–14–6) | New Hampshire (20–15–1) | 20. |
| | Preseason Sep 25 | Week 1 Oct 9 | Week 2 Oct 16 | Week 3 Oct 23 | Week 4 Oct 30 | Week 5 Nov 6 | Week 6 Nov 13 | Week 7 Nov 20 | Week 8 Nov 27 | Week 9 Dec 4 | Week 10 Dec 11 | Week 12 Jan 2 | Week 13 Jan 8 | Week 14 Jan 15 | Week 15 Jan 22 | Week 16 Jan 29 | Week 17 Feb 5 | Week 18 Feb 12 | Week 19 Feb 19 | Week 20 Feb 26 | Week 21 Mar 4 | Week 22 Mar 11 | Week 23 Mar 18 | Week 24 Mar 25 | Final Apr 15 | |
| | | Dropped: Notre Dame | Dropped: Merrimack; Connecticut | Dropped: Michigan Tech; Minnesota State; St. Cloud State | Dropped: Northeastern; Omaha | Dropped: Harvard | Dropped: Minnesota Duluth; Ohio State | None | Dropped: Notre Dame | Dropped: Omaha | Dropped: Notre Dame | None | None | Dropped: Penn State | Dropped: Omaha | Dropped: Notre Dame | None | None | None | None | None | None | Dropped: Arizona State | Dropped: Bemidji State | None | |

== USA Hockey ==
| | Preseason Oct 2 | Week 1 Oct 9 | Week 2 Oct 16 | Week 3 Oct 23 | Week 4 Oct 30 | Week 5 Nov 6 | Week 6 Nov 13 | Week 7 Nov 20 | Week 8 Nov 27 | Week 9 Dec 4 | Week 10 Dec 11 | Week 11 Dec 18 | Week 13 Jan 8 | Week 14 Jan 15 | Week 15 Jan 22 | Week 16 Jan 29 | Week 17 Feb 5 | Week 18 Feb 12 | Week 19 Feb 19 | Week 20 Feb 26 | Week 21 Mar 4 | Week 22 Mar 11 | Week 23 Mar 18 | Week 24 Mar 25 | Week 25 Apr 2 | Final Apr 15 | |
|---|---|---|---|---|---|---|---|---|---|---|---|---|---|---|---|---|---|---|---|---|---|---|---|---|---|---|---|
| 1. | Boston University (16) | Minnesota (0–0–0) (17) | Minnesota (2–0–0) (23) | Minnesota (3–1–0) (33) | Boston College (5–1–0) (27) | Boston College (7–1–0) (25) | Wisconsin (9–1–0) (28) | North Dakota (9–2–1) (15) т | Boston College (11–2–1) (18) | North Dakota (12–3–1) (23) | Boston College (13–3–1) (26) | Boston College (13–3–1) (28) | Boston College (13–3–1) (28) | Boston University (14–4–1) (27) | Boston University (16–4–1) (25) | Boston College (18–4–1) (34) | Boston College (19–4–1) (34) | Boston College (20–5–1) (22) | Boston College (23–5–1) (34) | Boston College (25–5–1) (34) | Boston College (27–5–1) (34) | Boston College (28–5–1) (34) | Boston College (29–5–1) (34) | Boston College (31–5–1) (34) | Boston College (33–5–1) (34) | Denver (32–9–3) (34) | 1. |
| 2. | Minnesota (6) | Boston University (1–0–0) (16) | Denver (2–0–0) (9) | Denver (3–1–0) (1) | Denver (4–1–1) (5) | Denver (6–1–1) (3) | Denver (7–2–1) (3) | Boston College (9–2–1) (11) т | North Dakota (11–2–1) (16) | Boston University (11–4–1) (6) | Boston University (11–4–1) (7) | Boston University (11–4–1) (5) | Boston University (12–4–1) (3) | Boston College (14–4–1) (6) | Boston College (16–4–1) (7) | North Dakota (18–6–2) | North Dakota (20–6–2) | North Dakota (20–6–2) (10) | Boston University (20–8–2) | Boston University (22–8–2) | Boston University (22–8–2) | Boston University (24–8–2) | Boston University (25–8–2) | Boston University (26–9–2) | Boston University (28–9–2) | Boston College (34–6–1) | 2. |
| 3. | Quinnipiac (12) | Denver (2–0–0) (1) | Boston College (2–0–0) (1) | Boston College (3–1–0) | Michigan (5–2–1) | Wisconsin (9–1–0) (3) | Boston College (7–2–1) (2) | Quinnipiac (9–3–1) (8) | Denver (10–3–1) | Boston College (12–3–1) (1) | Quinnipiac (12–4–1) (1) | Quinnipiac (12–4–1) (1) | Wisconsin (18–4–0) (3) | Quinnipiac (15–4–2) | Wisconsin (19–4–1) (2) | Boston University (16–6–1) | Boston University (17–7–1) | Boston University (19–7–1) (2) | Denver (20–8–2) | North Dakota (22–8–2) | North Dakota (24–8–2) | Denver (24–9–3) | Denver (26–9–3) | Denver (27–9–3) | Denver (30–9–3) | Boston University (28–10–2) | 3. |
| 4. | Michigan | Quinnipiac (0–1–0) | Quinnipiac (2–1–0) | North Dakota (3–1–0) | North Dakota (4–1–1) | North Dakota (5–2–1) | North Dakota (7–2–1) | Denver (8–3–1) | Quinnipiac (9–4–1) | Quinnipiac (11–4–1) (3) | North Dakota (12–5–1) | North Dakota (12–5–1) | North Dakota (14–5–1) | Wisconsin (19–4–1) (1) | Denver (17–5–2) | Wisconsin (20–5–1) | Wisconsin (20–6–2) | Wisconsin (22–6–2) | Michigan State (20–7–3) | Denver (21–8–3) | Denver (23–8–3) | Michigan State (22–9–3) | North Dakota (26–10–2) | Michigan State (24–9–3) | Michigan (23–14–3) | Michigan (23–15–3) | 4. |
| 5. | Denver | Boston College (1–0–0) | North Dakota (2–0–0) | Quinnipiac (3–2–0) | Wisconsin (7–1–0) (1) | Minnesota (4–3–1) | Providence (8–1–2) (1) | Boston University (8–3–1) | Boston University (9–4–1) | Denver (11–4–1) (1) | Denver (12–5–1) | Denver (12–5–1) | Quinnipiac (13–4–2) | Michigan State (15–4–3) | North Dakota (16–6–2) | Maine (16–4–2) | Quinnipiac (19–6–2) | Denver (18–8–2) т | North Dakota (20–8–2) | Wisconsin (24–8–2) | Michigan State (22–9–3) | North Dakota (24–10–2) | Michigan State (23–9–3) | North Dakota (26–11–2) | Michigan State (25–10–3) | Michigan State (25–10–3) | 5. |
| 6. | Boston College | Michigan (1–1–0) | Boston University (1–1–0) (1) | Michigan (3–2–1) | Minnesota (3–3–0) | Providence (6–1–2) | Minnesota (5–3–2) | Wisconsin (9–3–0) | Minnesota (7–4–3) | Wisconsin (12–4–0) | Wisconsin (14–4–0) | Wisconsin (14–4–0) | Denver (14–5–1) | Denver (15–5–2) | Maine (16–4–2) | Denver (17–7–2) | Denver (18–8–2) | Michigan State (20–7–3) т | Wisconsin (22–8–2) | Michigan State (21–8–3) | Wisconsin (25–9–2) | Minnesota (22–9–5) | Quinnipiac (26–8–2) | Maine (23–11–2) | Quinnipiac (27–10–2) | Quinnipiac (27–10–2) | 6. |
| 7. | St. Cloud State | North Dakota (0–0–0) | Michigan (2–2–0) | Michigan State (5–1–0) | Quinnipiac (4–3–0) | Cornell (4–0–0) (3) | Quinnipiac (7–3–1) | Michigan State (10–3–1) | Michigan State (10–4–2) | Michigan State (10–4–2) | Michigan State (12–4–2) | Michigan State (12–4–2) | Maine (13–3–2) | North Dakota (15–6–1) | Michigan State (16–5–3) | Quinnipiac (17–6–2) | Maine (17–5–2) | Minnesota (18–7–5) | Quinnipiac (22–7–2) | Quinnipiac (23–7–2) | Quinnipiac (24–8–2) | Quinnipiac (24–8–2) | Maine (23–10–2) | Minnesota (22–10–5) | Minnesota (23–11–5) | Minnesota (23–11–5) | 7. |
| 8. | North Dakota | Michigan State (2–0–0) | Cornell (0–0–0) | Providence (4–1–0) | Boston University (3–2–1) | Boston University (4–3–1) | Boston University (6–3–1) | Minnesota (6–4–2) | Wisconsin (10–4–0) | Maine (8–3–1) | Maine (10–3–1) | Maine (10–3–1) | Michigan State (13–4–3) | Maine (14–4–2) | Quinnipiac (15–6–2) | Michigan State (17–6–3) | Michigan State (18–7–3) | Maine (18–6–2) | Minnesota (19–8–5) | Minnesota (19–8–5) | Minnesota (20–9–5) | Maine (22–10–2) | Minnesota (22–10–5) | Quinnipiac (26–9–2) | North Dakota (26–12–2) | North Dakota (26–12–2) | 8. |
| 9. | Michigan State | St. Cloud State (1–1–0) | Michigan State (3–1–0) | Boston University (2–2–0) | Providence (5–1–1) | Michigan (5–4–1) | Maine (6–1–1) | Providence (8–3–2) | Providence (9–4–2) | Minnesota (8–5–3) | Minnesota (9–5–4) | Minnesota (9–5–4) | Providence (10–5–2) | Providence (11–6–2) | Minnesota (14–6–4) | Minnesota (15–7–4) | Minnesota (16–7–5) | Quinnipiac (20–7–2) | Maine (18–8–2) | Maine (19–9–2) | Maine (20–10–2) | Wisconsin (26–11–2) | Wisconsin (26–11–2) | Wisconsin (26–11–2) | Cornell (22–7–6) | Cornell (22–7–6) | 9. |
| 10. | Western Michigan | Michigan Tech (0–0–1) | Western Michigan (1–0–1) | Western Michigan (3–0–1) | Cornell (2–0–0) (1) | Quinnipiac (5–3–1) | Cornell (4–1–1) | New Hampshire (6–2–1) | Massachusetts (9–3–1) | Providence (9–4–2) | Massachusetts (11–4–1) | Massachusetts (11–4–1) | Western Michigan (13–4–1) | Minnesota (12–6–4) | Massachusetts (13–6–3) | Providence (14–7–2) | Massachusetts (14–7–3) | Massachusetts (16–7–3) | Colorado College (18–9–1) | Providence (17–10–3) | Providence (18–11–3) | Colorado College (20–11–3) | Michigan (21–13–3) | Michigan (21–14–3) | Maine (23–12–2) | Wisconsin (26–12–2) | 10. |
| 11. | Michigan Tech | Cornell (0–0–0) | Penn State (3–0–0) | Cornell (0–0–0) | Western Michigan (3–0–1) | Michigan State (7–3–0) | Michigan State (8–3–1) | Massachusetts (8–3–1) | Maine (6–3–1) | Massachusetts (9–4–1) | Providence (9–5–2) | Providence (9–5–2) | Minnesota (9–6–4) | Western Michigan (14–5–1) | Providence (12–7–2) | Massachusetts (13–6–3) | Michigan (14–9–3) | Providence (16–9–2) | Providence (16–10–3) | Western Michigan (18–11–1) | Massachusetts (19–10–3) | Michigan (20–13–3) | Omaha (22–11–4) | Cornell (21–6–6) | Wisconsin (26–12–2) | Maine (23–12–2) | 11. |
| 12. | Merrimack | Western Michigan (0–0–0) | Providence (2–1–0) | Minnesota Duluth (3–0–2) | Michigan State (5–3–0) | Western Michigan (4–1–1) | Michigan (5–5–2) | Maine (6–3–1) | Michigan (7–6–3) | Arizona State (11–3–2) | Western Michigan (11–4–1) | Western Michigan (11–4–1) | Arizona State (16–3–5) | Massachusetts (12–6–3) т | Western Michigan (15–6–1) | Michigan (12–9–3) | Cornell (13–4–4) | Cornell (15–4–4) | Western Michigan (17–10–1) | Massachusetts (17–10–3) | Colorado College (19–10–3) | Western Michigan (20–13–1) | Massachusetts (20–12–3) | Omaha (23–12–4) | Omaha (23–13–4) | Massachusetts (20–14–3) | 12. |
| 13. | Harvard | Merrimack (0–0–0) | Ohio State (2–0–1) | Harvard (0–0–0) | Ohio State (3–1–3) | Maine (5–1–0) | New Hampshire (4–2–1) | Arizona State (9–2–1) | Arizona State (10–3–1) | Western Michigan (10–3–1) | Michigan (8–7–3) | Arizona State (13–3–4) | Massachusetts (11–5–3) | St. Cloud State (11–6–3) т | Cornell (10–4–3) | Cornell (11–4–4) | Providence (15–8–2) | Western Michigan (17–10–1) | Cornell (16–4–5) | St. Cloud State (15–10–5) | Michigan (18–13–3) | Omaha (20–10–4) | Colorado College (21–13–3) | Western Michigan (21–15–1) | Massachusetts (20–14–3) | Omaha (23–13–4) | 13. |
| 14. | Cornell | Ohio State (1–0–0) | Minnesota Duluth (1–0–2) | Penn State (4–1–0) | Minnesota Duluth (3–2–2) | Massachusetts (5–2–1) | Arizona State (7–2–1) | Michigan (6–6–2) | New Hampshire (7–3–1) | Michigan (8–7–3) | Arizona State (11–3–4) | St. Cloud State (9–5–2) | St. Cloud State (11–5–2) | Michigan (10–7–3) | St. Cloud State (11–7–4) | Western Michigan (15–8–1) | Western Michigan (16–9–1) | Michigan (14–11–3) | Massachusetts (16–9–3) | Colorado College (18–10–2) | Western Michigan (18–13–1) | Providence (18–12–4) | Cornell (19–6–6) | Massachusetts (20–13–3) | Western Michigan (21–16–1) | Western Michigan (21–16–1) | 14. |
| 15. | Ohio State | Providence (1–1–0) | Harvard (0–0–0) | Ohio State (2–1–2) | Harvard (0–0–1) | New Hampshire (4–2–1) | Massachusetts (6–3–1) | Western Michigan (6–3–1) | Western Michigan (8–3–1) | St. Cloud State (8–5–1) | St. Cloud State (9–5–2) | Michigan (8–7–3) | Michigan (8–7–3) | Cornell (8–4–3) | Michigan (11–8–3) | St. Cloud State (11–8–5) | Colorado College (16–9–1) | St. Cloud State (14–9–5) | St. Cloud State (14–9–5) | Cornell (16–5–6) | Cornell (17–6–6) | Cornell (17–6–6) | Western Michigan (21–15–1) | Colorado College (21–13–3) | Colorado College (21–13–3) | Colorado College (21–13–3) | 15. |
| 16. | Penn State | Harvard (0–0–0) | Northeastern (2–0–0) | Arizona State (4–0–0) | New Hampshire (4–1–0) | Penn State (5–2–2) | Western Michigan (4–3–1) | St. Cloud State (8–4–0) | Cornell (5–3–1) | New Hampshire (7–4–1) | New Hampshire (8–4–1) | New Hampshire (8–4–1) | New Hampshire (11–5–1) | Arizona State (16–5–5) | New Hampshire (12–7–1) | Colorado College (15–8–1) | St. Cloud State (12–9–5) | Colorado College (16–9–1) | Michigan (15–12–3) | Michigan (17–12–3) | St. Cloud State (15–12–5) | Massachusetts (19–12–3) | Providence (18–13–4) | Providence (18–13–4) | Providence (18–13–4) | Providence (18–13–4) | 16. |
| 17. | Minnesota Duluth | Penn State (1–0–0) | Michigan Tech (0–1–2) | Northeastern (2–0–0) | Penn State (5–2–0) | Arizona State (6–1–1) | St. Cloud State (6–4–0) | Cornell (4–3–1) | St. Cloud State (8–5–1) | Penn State (9–5–3) | Cornell (6–4–1) | Cornell (6–4–1) | Cornell (6–4–3) | New Hampshire (11–6–1) | Colorado College (13–8–1) | New Hampshire (13–8–1) | New Hampshire (14–9–1) | Arizona State (20–6–6) | New Hampshire (16–11–1) | New Hampshire (17–12–1) | Omaha (18–10–4) | New Hampshire (19–14–1) | St. Cloud State (17–15–5) | St. Cloud State (17–16–5) | RIT (27–11–2) | RIT (27–11–2) | 17. |
| 18. | Northeastern | Minnesota Duluth (0–0–1) | St. Cloud State (1–3–0) | Wisconsin (5–1–0) | Massachusetts (4–2–1) | Minnesota Duluth (3–3–3) | Notre Dame (6–3–2) | Notre Dame (7–4–2) | Penn State (8–4–3) | Cornell (6–4–1) | Penn State (9–7–3) | Penn State (9–7–3) | Colorado College (10–6–1) | Colorado College (11–8–1) | Arizona State (17–6–5) | Arizona State (17–6–5) | Arizona State (18–6–6) | Omaha (15–10–3) | Arizona State (20–6–6) | Omaha (16–10–4) | New Hampshire (17–14–1) | St. Cloud State (15–14–5) | New Hampshire (20–15–1) | RIT (27–10–2) | St. Cloud State (17–16–5) | St. Cloud State (17–16–5) | 18. |
| 19. | Notre Dame | Northeastern (1–0–0) | Arizona State (2–0–0) | Massachusetts (4–1–0) | Arizona State (4–1–1) | Ohio State (3–3–3) | Penn State (5–3–3) | Penn State (6–4–3) | RIT (8–4–0) | RIT (10–4–0) | RIT (11–5–0) | RIT (11–5–0) | Penn State (10–7–3) | Omaha (11–7–2) | Notre Dame (13–11–2) | Omaha (12–9–3) | Omaha (14–9–3) | New Hampshire (14–11–1) | Omaha (15–10–3) | Arizona State (21–7–6) | Arizona State (23–7–6) | RIT (24–10–2) | RIT (26–10–2) | New Hampshire (20–15–1) | New Hampshire (20–15–1) | New Hampshire (20–15–1) | 19. |
| 20. | Providence | Connecticut (1–0–1) | Minnesota State (2–0–0) | Merrimack (2–2–0) | Maine (3–1–0) т Merrimack (3–2–0) т | Harvard (0–1–2) | Harvard (1–1–3) | Harvard (1–1–3) | Notre Dame (7–5–2) | Notre Dame (8–6–2) | Colorado College (9–6–1) | Colorado College (9–6–1) | RIT (13–6–1) | RIT (13–7–1) | RIT (15–8–1) | Notre Dame (13–11–2) | Notre Dame (14–12–2) т RIT (18–8–2) т | Northeastern (12–12–2) | Notre Dame (15–15–2) | RIT (22–10–2) | RIT (22–10–2) | Northeastern (16–15–3) | Bemidji State (20–15–2) | Michigan Tech (19–14–6) | Michigan Tech (19–15–6) | Michigan Tech (19–15–6) | 20. |
| | Preseason Oct 2 | Week 1 Oct 9 | Week 2 Oct 16 | Week 3 Oct 23 | Week 4 Oct 30 | Week 5 Nov 6 | Week 6 Nov 13 | Week 7 Nov 20 | Week 8 Nov 27 | Week 9 Dec 4 | Week 10 Dec 11 | Week 11 Dec 18 | Week 13 Jan 8 | Week 14 Jan 15 | Week 15 Jan 22 | Week 16 Jan 29 | Week 17 Feb 5 | Week 18 Feb 12 | Week 19 Feb 19 | Week 20 Feb 26 | Week 21 Mar 4 | Week 22 Mar 11 | Week 23 Mar 18 | Week 24 Mar 25 | Week 25 Apr 2 | Final Apr 15 | |
| | | Dropped: Notre Dame | Dropped: Merrimack; Connecticut | Dropped: Michigan Tech; St. Cloud State; Minnesota State | Dropped: Northeastern | Dropped: Merrimack | Dropped: Minnesota Duluth; Ohio State | None | Dropped: Harvard | None | Dropped: Notre Dame | None | None | Dropped: Penn State | Dropped: Omaha | Dropped: RIT | None | Dropped: Notre Dame; RIT | Dropped: Northeastern | Dropped: Notre Dame | None | Dropped: Arizona State | Dropped: Northeastern | Dropped: Bemidji State | None | None | |
