= Mukhor-Shibirka =

Rural locality in Khiloksky District, Zabaykalsky Krai, Russia

Coordinates: 51°21′N 109°42′E

Mukhor-Shibirka (Russian: Мухор-Шибирка), also known as Mukhor-Shibir (Мухор-Шибирь), is a village (selo) in the west of Khiloksky District of Zabaykalsky Krai, Russia, located not far from the Khilok River, 63 kilometers (39 mi) from the town of Khilok. Population: 10 (2002); 84 (1989).

It was founded in the end of the 19th century as a sawmill serving the railway stop #39 (also known as Vaykulichi). Several Buryat uluses were located in the vicinity.

Mukhor-Shibirka was home to the administrations of three kolkhozes (Udarnik, imeni N. S. Khrushchyova, and Druzhba) during the 1930s–1960s, and its population was mostly employed in agriculture and railroad industry.
