= Taydut =

Taydut Тайдут
- Selo
- Location within Zabaykalsky Krai Location within Russia
- Coordinates: 51°38′N 110°25′E
- Country: Russia
- Region: Zabaykalsky Krai
- District: Khiloksky District
- Time zone: UTC+9:00

Taydut (Russian: Тайдут) is a rural locality (a selo) in Khiloksky District, Zabaykalsky Krai, Russia. Population: 71 (2021 census); 80 (2010 census);

== Geography ==
This rural locality is located 73 km from Khilok (the district's administrative centre), 150 km from Chita (capital of Zabaykalsky Krai) and 5,114 km from Moscow. Sarantuy is the nearest rural locality.
