= Terepkhen =

Terepkhen Тэрэпхэн
- Selo
- Location within Zabaykalsky Krai Location within Russia
- Coordinates: 51°21′N 109°53′E
- Country: Russia
- Region: Zabaykalsky Krai
- District: Khiloksky District
- Time zone: UTC+9:00

Terepkhen (Russian: Тэрэпхэн) is a rural locality (a selo) in Khiloksky District, Zabaykalsky Krai, Russia. Population: 153 (2021 census); 202 (2010 census); There are 5 streets in this selo.

== Geography ==
This rural locality is located 39 km from Khilok (the district's administrative centre), 261 km from Chita (capital of Zabaykalsky Krai) and 5,043 km from Moscow. Bada is the nearest rural locality.
