= Khiloksky =

Khiloksky (masculine), Khilokskaya (feminine), or Khilokskoye (neuter) may refer to:

- Khiloksky District, a district of Zabaykalsky Krai, Russia
- Khilokskoye Urban Settlement, a municipal formation which the town of Khilok and two rural localities in Khiloksky District of Zabaykalsky Krai, Russia are incorporated as
