= Engorok =

Engorok Энгорок
- Selo
- Location within Zabaykalsky Krai Location within Russia
- Coordinates: 50°58′N 110°21′E
- Country: Russia
- Region: Zabaykalsky Krai
- District: Khiloksky District
- Time zone: UTC+9:00

Engorok (Russian: Энгорок) is a rural locality (a selo) in Khiloksky District, Zabaykalsky Krai, Russia. Population: 127 (2021 census); 171 (2010 census); There are 6 streets in this selo.

== Geography ==
This rural locality is located 43 km from Khilok (the district's administrative centre), 250 km from Chita (capital of Zabaykalsky Krai) and 5,120 km from Moscow. Khilogoson is the nearest rural locality.
