= Glina =

Glina is a word of Slavic origin, meaning "clay". It may refer to:

Bosnia & Herzegovina and Croatia

- Glina, Croatia, a town
- Glina (river) in Croatia and Bosnia and Herzegovina

Poland

- Glina, Piotrków County, a village in Łódź Voivodeship, central Poland
- Glina, Sieradz County, a village in Łódź Voivodeship, central Poland
- Glina, Gmina Rzeczyca, Tomaszów County, a village in Łódź Voivodeship, central Poland
- Glina, Lipsko County, a village in Masovian Voivodeship, east-central Poland
- Glina, Gmina Małkinia Górna, Ostrów County, a village in Masovian Voivodeship, east-central Poland
- Glina, Otwock County, a village in Masovian Voivodeship, east-central Poland
- Glina, Węgrów County, a village in Masovian Voivodeship, east-central Poland
- Glina, Pomeranian Voivodeship, a village in northern Poland

Romania

- Glina, Ilfov, a commune in Ilfov County

Slovenia & Slovene names

- Glina, Bloke, a village in Slovenia
- Glina (Gurk), the Slovene name for the river Glan in Carinthia, Austria

== See also ==
- Glinka (disambiguation)
- Hlinka
