= Zhipkhegen =

Zhipkhegen Жипхеген
- Settlement
- Location within Zabaykalsky Krai Location within Russia
- Coordinates: 51°27′N 110°10′E
- Country: Russia
- Region: Zabaykalsky Krai
- District: Khiloksky District
- Time zone: UTC+9:00

Zhipkhegen (Russian: Жипхеген) is a rural locality (a settlement) in Khiloksky District, Zabaykalsky Krai, Russia. Population: 1,076 (2021 census); 1,286 (2010 census); There are 16 streets in this settlement.

== Geography ==
This rural locality is located 23 km from Khilok (the district's administrative centre), 239 km from Chita (capital of Zabaykalsky Krai) and 5,050 km from Moscow. Glinka is the nearest rural locality.
