= Daygur =

Daygur Дайгур
- Selo
- Location within Zabaykalsky Krai Location within Russia
- Coordinates: 51°29′N 111°03′E
- Country: Russia
- Region: Zabaykalsky Krai
- District: Khiloksky District
- Time zone: UTC+9:00

Daygur (Russian: Дайгур) is a rural locality (a selo) in Khiloksky District, Zabaykalsky Krai, Russia. Population: 85 (2021 census); 94 (2010 census); There are 2 streets in this selo.

== Geography ==
This rural locality is located 44 km from Khilok (the district's administrative centre), 180 km from Chita (capital of Zabaykalsky Krai) and 5,107 km from Moscow. Khushenga is the nearest rural locality.
