= 2019–20 Canisius Golden Griffins men's ice hockey season =

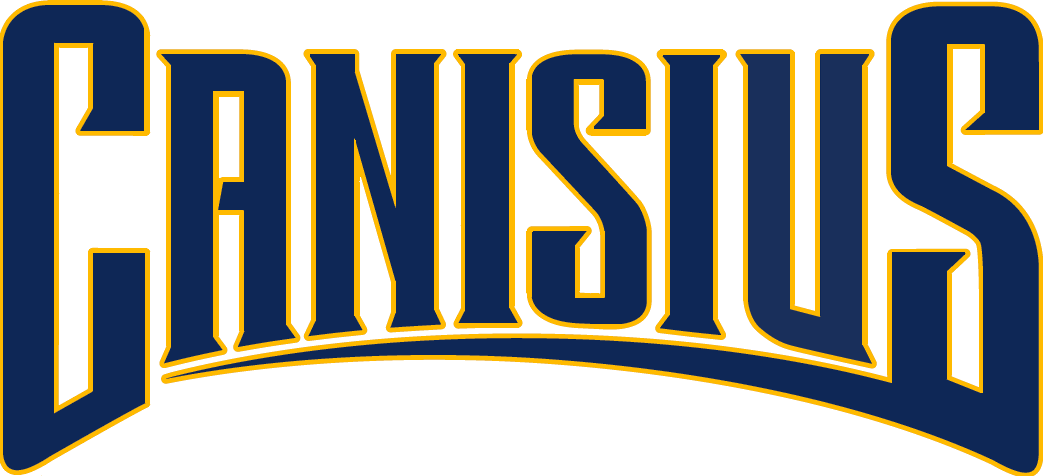
- Conference: 9th Atlantic Hockey
- Home ice: LECOM Harborcenter

Rankings
- USCHO.com: NR
- USA Today/ US Hockey Magazine: NR

Record
- Overall: 10–20–6
- Conference: 9–13–6–3
- Home: 6–9–2
- Road: 4–11–4
- Neutral: 0–0–0

Coaches and captains
- Head coach: Trevor Large
- Assistant coaches: Martin Hlinka; Taylor Nelson
- Captain: Matt Hoover

The 2019–20 Canisius Golden Griffins men's ice hockey season was the 40th season of play for the program, the 22nd at the Division I level, and the 17th season in the Atlantic Hockey conference. The Golden Griffins represented Canisius College and were coached by Trevor Large, in his 3rd season.

== Current roster ==
As of September 3, 2019.

No.	Nat.	Player	Class	Pos	Height	Weight	DoB	Hometown	Previous team	NHL rights
4	(United States)	Logan Gestro	Junior	D	6' 3" (1.91 m)	205 lb (93 kg)	1996-02-09	South Lyon, Michigan	Corpus Christi IceRays (NAHL)	—
5	(United States)	David Melaragni	Freshman	D	6' 0" (1.83 m)	180 lb (82 kg)	1998-03-30	Philadelphia, Pennsylvania	Cowichan Valley Capitals (BCHL)	—
8	(Canada)	Keaton Mastrodonato	Freshman	F	6' 0" (1.83 m)	205 lb (93 kg)	2000-09-24	Powell River, British Columbia	Alberni Valley Bulldogs (BCHL)	—
9	(Canada)	J. D. Pogue	Sophomore	F	6' 1" (1.85 m)	195 lb (88 kg)	1997-06-23	Montreal, Quebec	Cornwall Colts (NAHL)	—
10	(United States)	Nick Parody	Freshman	D	6' 3" (1.91 m)	195 lb (88 kg)	1998-01-02	Harrisburg, Pennsylvania	Islanders Hockey Club (NCDC)	—
14	(United States)	John Stampohar	Freshman	D	6' 2" (1.88 m)	210 lb (95 kg)	1998-09-24	Grand Rapids, Minnesota	Fairbanks Ice Dogs (NAHL)	—
15	(United States)	Grant Meyer	Junior	F	5' 8" (1.73 m)	180 lb (82 kg)	1996-03-21	Genoa, Ohio	Fargo Force (USHL)	—
20	(United States)	David Baskerville	Sophomore	F	6' 0" (1.83 m)	180 lb (82 kg)	1997-04-01	Buffalo, New York	Corpus Christi IceRays (NAHL)	—
23	(United States)	Casey Jerry	Senior	F	6' 1" (1.85 m)	180 lb (82 kg)	1995-01-14	River Falls, Wisconsin	Minnesota Magicians (NAHL)	—
24	(United States)	Matt Stief	Senior	F	5' 9" (1.75 m)	175 lb (79 kg)	1996-01-13	Weston, Florida	Prince George Spruce Kings (BCHL)	—
25	(United States)	Matt Long	Junior	F	6' 0" (1.83 m)	190 lb (86 kg)	1997-08-06	Orland Park, Illinois	Springfield Jr. Blues (NAHL)	—
27	(Canada)	Ryan Miotto	Freshman	F	6' 0" (1.83 m)	185 lb (84 kg)	1999-07-11	Thorold, Ontario	Alberni Valley Bulldogs (BCHL)	—
28	(Canada)	Lee Lapid	Sophomore	F	6' 0" (1.83 m)	190 lb (86 kg)	1998-01-11	Thornhill, Ontario	Toronto Patriots (OJHL)	—
29	(Canada)	Daniel Urbani	Senior	G	6' 1" (1.85 m)	210 lb (95 kg)	1995-06-21	Coquitlam, British Columbia	Trenton Golden Hawks (OJHL)	—
30	(United States)	Jacob Barczewski	Freshman	G	6' 1" (1.85 m)	175 lb (79 kg)	1999-01-07	O'Fallon, Missouri	Tri-City Storm (USHL)	—
32	(United States)	Tucker Weppner	Junior	G	6' 2" (1.88 m)	200 lb (91 kg)	1996-06-09	Williamsville, New York	Buffalo Jr. Sabres (OJHL)	—
33	(United States)	Matt Ladd	Sophomore	G	6' 3" (1.91 m)	200 lb (91 kg)	1998-07-11	Getzville, New York	New Jersey Titans (NAHL)	—
37	(United States)	Kevin Obssuth	Sophomore	F	6' 1" (1.85 m)	195 lb (88 kg)	1997-07-09	Morristown, New Jersey	Powell River Kings (BCHL)	—
40	(Canada)	Jesse Pereira	Senior	F	5' 11" (1.8 m)	195 lb (88 kg)	1995-03-31	Fort Erie, Ontario	Brooks Bandits (AJHL)	—
44	(United States)	Will Scherer	Senior	D	6' 0" (1.83 m)	205 lb (93 kg)	1996-01-25	St. Charles, Missouri	Brown Bears (ECAC)	—
52	(United States)	Blake Wareham	Junior	D	6' 0" (1.83 m)	190 lb (86 kg)	1997-03-05	Park Ridge, Illinois	Janesville Jets (NAHL)	—
53	(United States)	Lincoln Erne	Freshman	D	6' 0" (1.83 m)	200 lb (91 kg)	1998-09-26	Blaine, Minnesota	Minot Minotauros (NAHL)	—
58	(Canada)	Derek Hamelin	Sophomore	D	5' 11" (1.8 m)	170 lb (77 kg)	1997-01-21	Mercier, Quebec	Langley Rivermen (BCHL)	—
71	(Canada)	MacGregor Sinclair	Freshman	F	6' 0" (1.83 m)	190 lb (86 kg)	1998-08-28	Irma, Alberta	Battlefords North Stars (SJHL)	—
72	(Canada)	Matt Hoover	Senior	F	5' 10" (1.78 m)	180 lb (82 kg)	1996-01-13	Brantford, Ontario	Nanaimo Clippers (BCHL)	—
81	(Canada)	Mitchell Martan	Sophomore	F	5' 8" (1.73 m)	180 lb (82 kg)	1998-06-30	Whitby, Ontario	Wellington Dukes (OJHL)	—
83	(United States)	Austin Alger	Junior	F	6' 0" (1.83 m)	170 lb (77 kg)	1997-09-23	Livonia, Michigan	Miami (NCHC)	—
89	(Canada)	Simon Gravel	Freshman	F	5' 10" (1.78 m)	185 lb (84 kg)	1999-04-10	Boucherville, Quebec	Brooks Bandits (AJHL)	—
91	(United States)	Nick Hutchison	Senior	F	6' 2" (1.88 m)	200 lb (91 kg)	1995-04-27	Hicksville, New York	Salmon Arm Silverbacks (BCHL)	—
94	(Canada)	Hudson Lambert	Freshman	D	6' 0" (1.83 m)	190 lb (86 kg)	1998-08-17	Richmond Hill, Ontario	Brampton Admirals (OJHL)	—

== Standings ==
2019–20 Atlantic Hockey Standings
	Conference record								Overall record					
	GP	W	L	T	3/SW	PTS	GF	GA	GP	W	L	T	GF	GA
#20 American International	28	21	6	1	0	64	96	46	34	21	12	1	103	68
Sacred Heart	28	18	8	2	0	56	104	63	34	21	10	3	127	82
RIT	28	15	9	4	1	50	86	73	36	19	13	4	108	98
Army	28	14	11	3	3	48	70	64	33	17	13	3	82	76
Niagara	28	12	12	4	2	42	64	65	34	12	18	4	72	87
Air Force	28	10	12	6	5	41	60	67	34	10	18	6	70	95
Robert Morris	28	11	12	5	3	41	65	65	34	11	18	5	75	90
Bentley	28	13	13	2	0	41	75	80	34	15	16	3	83	94
Canisius	28	9	13	6	3	36	71	83	34	10	18	6	80	109
Holy Cross	28	9	16	3	2	32	67	83	34	10	19	5	80	99
Mercyhurst	28	3	23	2	0	11	49	118	34	5	27	2	64	141
Championship: March 20, 2020 † indicates conference regular season champion; * indicates conference tournament champion Rankings: USCHO.com Top 20 Poll; updated March 1, 2020

== Schedule and results ==
Date	Time	Opponent^{#}	Rank^{#}	Site	TV	Decision	Result	Attendance	Record
Regular season
October 11	8:37 PM	at #18 North Dakota*		Ralph Engelstad Arena • Grand Forks, North Dakota		Ladd	L 0–5	11,068	0–1–0
October 12	8:07 PM	at #18 North Dakota*		Ralph Engelstad Arena • Grand Forks, North Dakota		Barczewski	L 1–8	11,579	0–2–0
October 19	7:00 PM	at Rensselaer*		Houston Field House • Troy, New York		Ladd	L 2–7	3,258	0–3–0
October 27	3:00 PM	vs. USNTDP*		LECOM Harborcenter • Buffalo, New York (Exhibition)		Urbani	L 1–3	476	
November 1	7:35 PM	vs. Union*		LECOM Harborcenter • Buffalo, New York		Urbani	L 0–3	636	0–4–0
November 2	4:05 PM	vs. Union*		LECOM Harborcenter • Buffalo, New York		Ladd	W 4–0	691	1–4–0
November 8	7:35 PM	vs. Robert Morris		LECOM Harborcenter • Buffalo, New York		Ladd	L 2–4	481	1–5–0 (0–1–0–0)
November 9	7:05 PM	at Robert Morris		Colonials Arena • Neville Township, Pennsylvania		Barczewski	L 2–4	512	1–6–0 (0–2–0–0)
November 15	7:35 PM	vs. Niagara		LECOM Harborcenter • Buffalo, New York (Battle of the Bridge)		Ladd	W 4–2	1,204	2–6–0 (1–2–0–0)
November 16	4:05 PM	vs. Niagara		LECOM Harborcenter • Buffalo, New York (Battle of the Bridge)		Ladd	L 3–5	657	2–7–0 (1–3–0–0)
November 23	7:35 PM	vs. Rensselaer*		LECOM Harborcenter • Buffalo, New York		Barczewski	L 2–3	1,107	2–8–0 (1–3–0–0)
November 29	1:05 PM	vs. Army		LECOM Harborcenter • Buffalo, New York		Urbani	L 4–3	819	2–9–0 (1–4–0–0)
November 30	1:05 PM	vs. Army		LECOM Harborcenter • Buffalo, New York		Urbani	L 3–2	907	2–10–0 (1–5–0–0)
December 6	1:05 PM	at American International		MassMutual Center • Springfield, Massachusetts		Urbani	L 0–6	244	2–11–0 (1–6–0–0)
December 7	1:10 PM	at American International		MassMutual Center • Springfield, Massachusetts		Ladd	L 2–3 ^{OT}	376	2–12–0 (1–7–0–0)
December 28	4:05 PM	vs. Holy Cross		LECOM Harborcenter • Buffalo, New York		Barczewski	W 5–2	525	3–12–0 (2–7–0–0)
December 29	4:05 PM	vs. Holy Cross		LECOM Harborcenter • Buffalo, New York		Barczewski	W 3–1	472	4–12–0 (3–7–0–0)
January 3	4:05 PM	at RIT		Gene Polisseni Center • Henrietta, New York		Barczewski	T 1–1 ^{SOL}	1,620	4–12–1 (3–7–1–0)
January 4	7:35 AM	vs. RIT		LECOM Harborcenter • Buffalo, New York		Barczewski	W 5–3	569	5–12–1 (4–7–1–0)
January 10	7:05 PM	vs. Bentley		Bentley Arena • Waltham, Massachusetts		Barczewski	T 3–3 ^{SOW}	1,127	5–12–2 (4–7–2–1)
January 11	7:05 PM	vs. Bentley		Bentley Arena • Waltham, Massachusetts		Barczewski	T 4–4 ^{3x3 OTW}	959	5–12–3 (4–7–3–2)
January 17	6:05 PM	at Sacred Heart		Webster Bank Arena • Bridgeport, Connecticut		Barczewski	T 3–3 ^{3x3 OTW}	256	5–12–4 (4–7–4–3)
January 18	1:05 PM	at Sacred Heart		Webster Bank Arena • Bridgeport, Connecticut		Barczewski	W 5–2	221	6–12–4 (5–7–4–3)
January 24	7:35 PM	vs. RIT		LECOM Harborcenter • Buffalo, New York		Barczewski	L 4–7	1,207	6–13–4 (5–8–4–3)
January 25	7:05 PM	at RIT		Gene Polisseni Center • Henrietta, New York		Barczewski	L 4–5	3,463	6–14–4 (5–9–4–3)
January 31	7:05 PM	at Army		Tate Rink • West Point, New York		Barczewski	W 3–2 ^{OT}	1,672	7–14–4 (6–9–4–3)
February 1	4:05 PM	at Army		Tate Rink • West Point, New York		Barczewski	L 2–4	2,116	7–15–4 (6–10–4–3)
February 7	7:35 PM	vs. Air Force		LECOM Harborcenter • Buffalo, New York		Barczewski	T 3–3 ^{SOL}	511	7–15–5 (6–10–5–3)
February 8	4:05 PM	vs. Air Force		LECOM Harborcenter • Buffalo, New York		Barczewski	W 1–0	1,108	8–15–5 (7–10–5–3)
February 14	7:35 PM	vs. American International		LECOM Harborcenter • Buffalo, New York		Barczewski	L 1–4	417	8–16–5 (7–11–5–3)
February 15	4:05 PM	vs. American International		LECOM Harborcenter • Buffalo, New York		Ladd	L 2–3	717	8–17–5 (7–12–5–3)
February 21	7:35 PM	vs. Robert Morris		LECOM Harborcenter • Buffalo, New York		Barczewski	T 1–1 ^{SOL}	597	8–17–6 (7–12–6–3)
February 22	7:05 PM	at Robert Morris		Colonials Arena • Neville Township, Pennsylvania		Barczewski	L 3–4	1,092	8–18–6 (7–13–6–3)
February 28	7:05 PM	at Mercyhurst		Mercyhurst Ice Center • Erie, Pennsylvania		Barczewski	W 3–2	736	9–18–6 (8–13–6–3)
February 29	7:05 PM	at Mercyhurst		Mercyhurst Ice Center • Erie, Pennsylvania		Barczewski	W 6–0	692	10–18–6 (9–13–6–3)
Atlantic Hockey Tournament
March 6	7:05 PM	at Bentley*		Bentley Arena • Waltham, Massachusetts (First Round Game 1)		Barczewski	L 1–6	373	10–19–6 (9–13–6–3)
March 7	7:05 PM	at Bentley*		Bentley Arena • Waltham, Massachusetts (First Round Game 2)		Barczewski	L 3–5	288	10–20–6 (9–13–6–3)
Canisius Lost Series 0–2
*Non-conference game. ^{#}Rankings from USCHO.com Poll. All times are in Eastern Time.

== Scoring Statistics ==
Name	Position	Games	Goals	Assists	Points	PIM
Nick Hutchison	C	31	18	14	32	49
Matt Hoover	LW	36	15	17	32	60
Matt Steif	D	36	3	23	26	8
Lee Lapid	C	35	11	10	21	27
Austin Alger	F	34	5	16	21	24
Keaton Mastrodonato	C	34	10	7	17	35
Grant Meyer	RW	24	4	12	16	12
Mitchell Martan	LW	32	3	11	14	10
Matt Long	F	28	6	4	10	12
Logan Gestro	D	28	0	8	8	16
Ryan Miotto	F	34	5	2	7	18
Hudson Lambert	D	30	0	7	7	23
Simon Gravel	C/RW	10	3	2	5	2
Blake Wareham	D	19	2	3	5	2
David Melaragni	D	28	1	4	5	31
Kevin Obssuth	LW	18	2	2	4	14
Derek Hamelin	D	29	1	3	4	12
David Baskerville	C	31	1	2	3	8
J. D. Pogue	LW	36	2	0	2	37
Will Scherer	D	16	1	1	2	20
Casey Jerry	F	25	0	2	2	33
Nick Parody	D	17	0	1	1	4
John Stampohar	D	18	0	1	1	12
MacGregor Sinclair	C	32	0	1	1	8
Jesse Pereira	RW	1	0	0	0	0
Daniel Urbani	G	4	0	0	0	0
Matt Ladd	G	14	0	0	0	0
Lincoln Erne	D	18	0	0	0	20
Jacob Barczewski	G	28	0	0	0	0
Total						

== Goaltending statistics ==
Name	Games	Minutes	Wins	Losses	Ties	Goals against	Saves	Shut outs	SV %	GAA
Jacob Barczewski	28	1416	8	10	6	69	655	1	.905	2.92
Daniel Urbani	4	218	0	4	0	14	94	0	.870	3.84
Matt Ladd	14	544	2	6	0	36	237	1	.868	3.97
Empty Net	-	18	-	-	-	3	-	-	-	-
Total	36	2197	10	20	6	122	986	3^{†}	.890	3.33

† Barczewski and Ladd both played in the shutout on February 29.

== Rankings ==
Poll	Week																							
Poll	Pre	1	2	3	4	5	6	7	8	9	10	11	12	13	14	15	16	17	18	19	20	21	22	23 (Final)
USCHO.com	NR	NR	NR	NR	NR	NR	NR	NR	NR	NR	NR	NR	NR	NR	NR	NR	NR	NR	NR	NR	NR	NR	NR	NR
USA Today	NR	NR	NR	NR	NR	NR	NR	NR	NR	NR	NR	NR	NR	NR	NR	NR	NR	NR	NR	NR	NR	NR	NR	NR
