= Ulyastuy =

Ulyastuy Улястуй
- Selo
- Location within Zabaykalsky Krai Location within Russia
- Coordinates: 51°12′N 110°41′E
- Country: Russia
- Region: Zabaykalsky Krai
- District: Khiloksky District
- Time zone: UTC+9:00

Ulyastuy (Russian: Улястуй) is a rural locality (a selo) in Khiloksky District, Zabaykalsky Krai, Russia. Population: 37 (2010 census); 22 (2002 census); There is 1 street in this selo.

== Geography ==
This rural locality is located 23 km from Khilok (the district's administrative centre), 216 km from Chita (capital of Zabaykalsky Krai) and 5,115 km from Moscow. Khilogoson is the nearest rural locality.
