= Gyrshelun =

Rural locality in Khiloksky District, Zabaykalsky Krai, Russia

Coordinates: 51°25′N 110°40′E

Ger shuluun (Russian: Гыршелун; Russian Buryat: Гэр шулуун) is a rural locality (a selo) in the central part of Khiloksky District in Zabaykalsky Krai, Russia, located on the right bank of the Khilok River, 17 kilometers (11 mi) east of the town of Khilok. Population: 916 (2002).

== History ==
It was founded in the end of the 19th century as a train stop and later became a train station. In 1905, a settlement grew around the station, the population of which was employed in the railway industry, as well as in wood processing and agriculture.

In the 1960s-1990s, a resort for railway workers was located 2 kilometers (1.2 mi) west of Ger shuluun.
