= Arenur =

Arenur Аренур
- Selo
- Location within Zabaykalsky Krai Location within Russia
- Coordinates: 51°22′N 111°24′E
- Country: Russia
- Region: Zabaykalsky Krai
- District: Khiloksky District
- Time zone: UTC+9:00

Arenur (Russian: Акнада) is a rural locality (a selo) in Khiloksky District, Zabaykalsky Krai, Russia. Population: 20 (2021 census); 28 (2010 census); There is 1 street in this selo.

== Geography ==
This rural locality is located 66 km from Khilok (the district's administrative centre), 162 km from Chita (capital of Zabaykalsky Krai) and 5,145 km from Moscow. Kharagun is the nearest rural locality.
