= Zagarino =

Rural locality in Khiloksky District, Zabaykalsky Krai, Russia

Coordinates: 51°41′N 111°42′E

Zagarino (Russian: Загарино) is a village (selo) under administrative jurisdiction of the urban-type settlement of Mogzon in Khiloksky District of Zabaykalsky Krai, Russia, located on the right bank of the Khilok River.

It was founded in 1895–1896 as a flag station of Zagarin (Загарин) of the Trans-Siberian Railway. It is now a dying village. The railway station provided employment to all of the inhabitants of the village, but it closed up in 1994. This caused a significant population decrease: from 133 people recorded in 1990 to 58 in 2002.
