= Khilok =

Khilok may refer to:

- Khilok (river), a river in eastern Siberia, Russia
- Khilok (inhabited locality), name of several inhabited localities in Russia
