= Sarantuy =

Sarantuy Сарантуй
- Selo
- Location within Zabaykalsky Krai Location within Russia
- Coordinates: 51°37′N 111°16′E
- Country: Russia
- Region: Zabaykalsky Krai
- District: Khiloksky District
- Time zone: UTC+9:00

Sarantuy (Russian: Сарантуй) is a rural locality (a selo) in Khiloksky District, Zabaykalsky Krai, Russia. Population: 8 (2021 census); 6 (2010 census); There is 1 street in this selo.

== Geography ==
This rural locality is located 64 km from Khilok (the district's administrative centre), 160 km from Chita (capital of Zabaykalsky Krai) and 5,106 km from Moscow. Taydut is the nearest rural locality.
