= Glinka (surname) =

Glinka is an old Polish surname. Notable people with the surname include:

- Daniil Glinka (born 2000), Estonian tennis player
- Dave Glinka (born 1941), American football player (retired)
- Dmitry Glinka (aviator) (1917–1979), Soviet flying ace
- Edward Janczewski-Glinka (1846–1918), Polish biologist
- Elizaveta Glinka (1962–2016), Russian humanitarian
- Fyodor Glinka (1786–1880), Russian poet and author
- Katarzyna Glinka (born 1977), Polish actress
- Konstantin Glinka (1867–1927), Russian soil scientist
- Małgorzata Glinka (born 1978), Polish volleyball player
- Marian Glinka (1943–2008), Polish actor
- Mikhail Glinka (1804–1857), Russian composer
- Sergey Glinka (1774–1847), Russian author
- Waldemar Glinka (born 1968), Polish long-distance runner
- Yuliana Glinka (1844–1918), Russian occultist
