= Shilya =

Shilya Шиля
- Selo
- Location within Zabaykalsky Krai Location within Russia
- Coordinates: 51°22′N 109°47′E
- Country: Russia
- Region: Zabaykalsky Krai
- District: Khiloksky District
- Time zone: UTC+9:00

Shilya (Russian: Шиля) is a rural locality (a selo) in Khiloksky District, Zabaykalsky Krai, Russia. Population: 180 (2010 census); 180 (2002 census); There are 2 streets in this selo.

== Geography ==
This rural locality is located 46 km from Khilok (the district's administrative centre), 267 km from Chita (capital of Zabaykalsky Krai) and 5,033 km from Moscow. Zakulta is the nearest rural locality.
