= Ushoty =

Ushoty Ушоты
- Selo
- Location within Zabaykalsky Krai Location within Russia
- Coordinates: 51°18′N 109°38′E
- Country: Russia
- Region: Zabaykalsky Krai
- District: Khiloksky District
- Time zone: UTC+9:00

Ushoty (Russian: Ушоты) is a rural locality (a selo) in Khiloksky District, Zabaykalsky Krai, Russia. Population: 163 (2021 census); 173 (2010 census); There are 3 streets in this selo.

== Geography ==
This rural locality is located 57 km from Khilok (the district's administrative centre), 280 km from Chita (capital of Zabaykalsky Krai) and 5,030 km from Moscow. Mukhor-Shibirka is the nearest rural locality.
