= Glinka (disambiguation) =

Mikhail Glinka (1804–1857) was a Russian composer.

Glinka may also refer to:

== People ==
- Glinka (surname)

== Places ==
- Glinka, Lower Silesian Voivodeship (south-west Poland)
- Glinka, Busko County, a village in south-central Poland
- Glinka, Ostrowiec County, a village in south-central Poland
- Glinka, Silesian Voivodeship (south Poland)
- Glinka, Braniewo County in Warmian-Masurian Voivodeship (north Poland)
- Glinka, Kętrzyn County in Warmian-Masurian Voivodeship (north Poland)
- Glinka, West Pomeranian Voivodeship (north-west Poland)
- Glinka, Russia, several rural localities in Russia
- Glinka (crater), an impact crater on Mercury

== See also ==
- Hlinka (Czech, Slovak, Ukrainian form)
