= 2020–21 Canisius Golden Griffins men's ice hockey season =

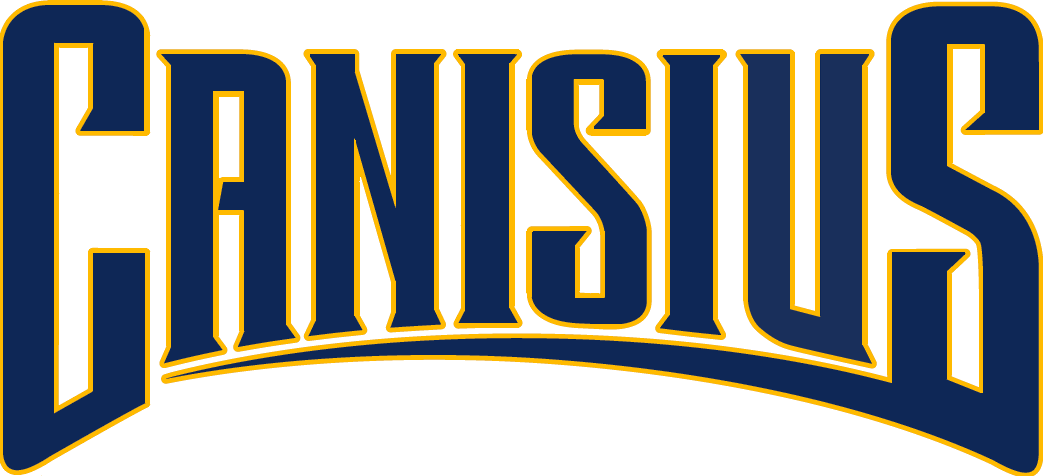
- Conference: 4th Atlantic Hockey
- Home ice: LECOM Harborcenter

Rankings
- USCHO.com: NR
- USA Today/ US Hockey Magazine: NR

Record
- Overall: 11–6–0
- Conference: 8–5–0–1–1–0
- Home: 6–1–0
- Road: 4–5–0
- Neutral: 1–0–0

Coaches and captains
- Head coach: Trevor Large
- Assistant coaches: Martin Hlinka; Taylor Nelson; Daniel Paille
- Captain: Grant Meyer

The 2020–21 Canisius Golden Griffins men's ice hockey season was the 41st season of play for the program, the 23rd at the Division I level, and the 18th season in the Atlantic Hockey conference. The Golden Griffins represented Canisius College and were coached by Trevor Large, in his 4th season.

The start of the college hockey season was delayed due to the ongoing coronavirus pandemic. As a result, Canisius's first scheduled game was in late-November as opposed to early-October, which was the norm.

== Season ==
As a result of the ongoing COVID-19 pandemic the entire college ice hockey season was delayed. Because the NCAA had previously announced that all winter sports athletes would retain whatever eligibility they possessed through at least the following year, none of Canisius' players would lose a season of play. However, the NCAA also approved a change in its transfer regulations that would allow players to transfer and play immediately rather than having to sit out a season, as the rules previously required.

Even after being delayed, Canisius had the start of their season disrupted by cancellations and postponements. The Golden Griffins played two games over a 62-day period. In February the team was finally able to put a string of games together and showed themselves to be one of the better teams in the western pod of Atlantic Hockey teams. After a four-game winning streak, Canisius was nearing their first top-20 ranking in years but the team was swept by a down Air Force club. Due to Canisius having so few games on their schedule, the losses to Air Force meant that the team had little chance of making the NCAA Tournament without winning their conference tournament.

After the Golden Griffins dispatched RIT in the quarterfinals, they had to get past a very strong Army team to reach the championship. The two teams battled through a close game, needing overtime to decide the winner, and J. D. Pogue's marker sent the Griffs to the title game. Canisius was unable to overcome American International despite the Yellow Jackets facing their own COVID problems and had to settle for second place. Canisius had a slim chance of being selected as an at-large bid but when the tournament teams were released, Atlantic Hockey was essentially disregarded, with league-leading AIC being given the 16th and final space in the bracket.

The program finished as a runner-up, the second-best performance in team history. Despite playing fewer than half the games of the previous season, Canisius recorded more wins. Sophomore Jacob Barczewski served as the team’s starting goaltender throughout the season.

John Stampohar and MacGregor Sinclair sat out the season.

== Departures ==
Player	Position	Nationality	Cause
Matt Hoover	Forward	United States	Graduation (Signed with Utah Grizzlies)
Nick Hutchison	Forward	United States	Graduation (Signed with Adirondack Thunder)
Casey Jerry	Forward	United States	Graduation
Jesse Pereira	Forward	Canada	Graduation
Will Scherer	Defenseman	United States	Graduation
Matt Stief	Defenseman	United States	Graduation (Signed with Macon Mayhem)
Daniel Urbani	Goaltender	Canada	Graduation

== Recruiting ==
Player	Position	Nationality	Age	Notes
Jackson Decker	Defenseman	United States	21	Algonquin, IL
Cooper Haar	Forward	United States	21	Huntington Beach, CA
Max Kouznetsov	Forward	United States	19	Voorhees, NJ
Jack Lyons	Defenseman	Canada	21	Mississauga, ON
Niclas Puikkonen	Forward	Sweden	21	Stockholm, SWE
Jami Virtanen	Forward	Finland	20	Pori, FIN
Connor Zilisch	Forward	United States	21	Appleton, WI

== Roster ==
As of September 17, 2020.

No.	Nat.	Player	Class	Pos	Height	Weight	DoB	Hometown	Previous team	NHL rights
4	(United States)	Logan Gestro	Senior	D	6' 3" (1.91 m)	205 lb (93 kg)	1996-02-09	South Lyon, Michigan	Corpus Christi IceRays (NAHL)	—
5	(United States)	David Melaragni	Sophomore	D	6' 0" (1.83 m)	180 lb (82 kg)	1998-03-30	Philadelphia, Pennsylvania	Cowichan Valley Capitals (BCHL)	—
8	(Canada)	Keaton Mastrodonato	Sophomore	F	6' 0" (1.83 m)	205 lb (93 kg)	2000-09-24	Powell River, British Columbia	Alberni Valley Bulldogs (BCHL)	—
9	(Canada)	J. D. Pogue	Junior	F	6' 1" (1.85 m)	195 lb (88 kg)	1997-06-23	Montreal, Quebec	Cornwall Colts (NAHL)	—
10	(United States)	Nick Parody	Sophomore	D	6' 3" (1.91 m)	195 lb (88 kg)	1998-01-02	Harrisburg, Pennsylvania	Islanders Hockey Club (NCDC)	—
14	(United States)	John Stampohar	Sophomore	D	6' 2" (1.88 m)	210 lb (95 kg)	1998-09-24	Grand Rapids, Minnesota	Fairbanks Ice Dogs (NAHL)	—
15	(United States)	Grant Meyer (C)	Senior	F	5' 8" (1.73 m)	180 lb (82 kg)	1996-03-21	Genoa, Ohio	Fargo Force (USHL)	—
20	(United States)	David Baskerville	Junior	F	6' 0" (1.83 m)	180 lb (82 kg)	1997-04-01	Buffalo, New York	Corpus Christi IceRays (NAHL)	—
23	(United States)	Cooper Haar	Freshman	F	6' 3" (1.91 m)	205 lb (93 kg)	1999-04-26	Huntington Beach, California	Aberdeen Wings (NAHL)	—
24	(United States)	Jackson Decker	Freshman	D	5' 11" (1.8 m)	170 lb (77 kg)	1999-03-19	Algonquin, Illinois	Chippewa Steel (NAHL)	—
25	(United States)	Matt Long	Senior	F	6' 0" (1.83 m)	190 lb (86 kg)	1997-08-06	Orland Park, Illinois	Springfield Jr. Blues (NAHL)	—
27	(Canada)	Ryan Miotto	Sophomore	F	6' 0" (1.83 m)	185 lb (84 kg)	1999-07-11	Thorold, Ontario	Alberni Valley Bulldogs (BCHL)	—
28	(Canada)	Lee Lapid	Junior	F	6' 0" (1.83 m)	190 lb (86 kg)	1998-01-11	Thornhill, Ontario	Toronto Patriots (OJHL)	—
30	(United States)	Jacob Barczewski	Sophomore	G	6' 1" (1.85 m)	175 lb (79 kg)	1999-01-07	O'Fallon, Missouri	Tri-City Storm (USHL)	—
32	(United States)	Tucker Weppner	Senior	G	6' 2" (1.88 m)	200 lb (91 kg)	1996-06-09	Williamsville, New York	Buffalo Jr. Sabres (OJHL)	—
33	(United States)	Matt Ladd	Junior	G	6' 3" (1.91 m)	200 lb (91 kg)	1998-07-11	Getzville, New York	New Jersey Titans (NAHL)	—
37	(United States)	Kevin Obssuth	Junior	F	6' 1" (1.85 m)	195 lb (88 kg)	1997-07-09	Morristown, New Jersey	Powell River Kings (BCHL)	—
40	(Sweden)	Niclas Puikkonen	Freshman	F	6' 1" (1.85 m)	198 lb (90 kg)	1999-01-23	Stockholm, Sweden	Amarillo Bulls (AJHL)	—
44	(United States)	Connor Zilisch	Freshman	F	6' 1" (1.85 m)	212 lb (96 kg)	1999-08-07	Appleton, Wisconsin	Topeka Pilots (NAHL)	—
52	(United States)	Blake Wareham	Senior	D	6' 0" (1.83 m)	190 lb (86 kg)	1997-03-05	Park Ridge, Illinois	Janesville Jets (NAHL)	—
53	(United States)	Lincoln Erne	Sophomore	D	6' 0" (1.83 m)	200 lb (91 kg)	1998-09-26	Blaine, Minnesota	Minot Minotauros (NAHL)	—
58	(Canada)	Derek Hamelin	Junior	D	5' 11" (1.8 m)	170 lb (77 kg)	1997-01-21	Mercier, Quebec	Langley Rivermen (BCHL)	—
71	(Canada)	MacGregor Sinclair	Sophomore	F	6' 0" (1.83 m)	190 lb (86 kg)	1998-08-28	Irma, Alberta	Battlefords North Stars (SJHL)	—
72	(United States)	Max Kouznetsov	Freshman	F	5' 11" (1.8 m)	175 lb (79 kg)	2000-12-06	Voorhees, New Jersey	Johnstown Tomahawks (NAHL)	—
77	(Canada)	Jack Lyons	Freshman	D	6' 1" (1.85 m)	205 lb (93 kg)	1999-07-04	Mississauga, Ontario	Oakville Blades (OJHL)	—
81	(Canada)	Mitchell Martan	Junior	F	5' 8" (1.73 m)	180 lb (82 kg)	1998-06-30	Whitby, Ontario	Wellington Dukes (OJHL)	—
83	(United States)	Austin Alger	Senior	F	6' 0" (1.83 m)	170 lb (77 kg)	1997-09-23	Livonia, Michigan	Miami (NCHC)	—
89	(Canada)	Simon Gravel	Sophomore	F	5' 10" (1.78 m)	185 lb (84 kg)	1999-04-10	Boucherville, Quebec	Brooks Bandits (AJHL)	—
91	(Finland)	Jami Virtanen	Freshman	F	6' 0" (1.83 m)	192 lb (87 kg)	2000-08-07	Pori, Finland	Ässät U20 (Nuorten SM-liiga)	—
94	(Canada)	Hudson Lambert	Sophomore	D	6' 0" (1.83 m)	190 lb (86 kg)	1998-08-17	Richmond Hill, Ontario	Brampton Admirals (OJHL)	—

== Standings ==
2020–21 Atlantic Hockey Standings
	Conference record											Overall record					
	GP	W	L	T	OW	OL	SW	PTS	PT%	GF	GA	GP	W	L	T	GF	GA
#15 American International †*	12	11	1	0	1	0	0	32	.889	47	18	19	15	4	0	67	40
Army	15	10	4	1	3	1	1	30	.667	42	33	22	15	6	1	71	48
Robert Morris	15	10	5	0	2	1	0	29	.644	58	48	24	15	9	0	85	69
Canisius	13	8	5	0	1	1	0	24	.615	42	34	17	11	6	0	59	46
RIT	13	7	5	1	0	0	1	23	.590	43	40	20	9	9	2	68	70
Sacred Heart	13	6	6	1	1	2	0	20	.513	35	38	18	6	10	2	43	59
Mercyhurst	16	7	8	1	1	1	1	23	.479	54	50	21	8	12	1	64	67
Bentley	15	4	11	0	1	5	0	16	.356	35	48	16	5	11	0	42	51
Niagara	15	3	9	3	0	2	1	15	.333	39	53	22	7	12	3	57	70
Air Force	13	3	9	1	2	1	0	9	.231	32	49	14	3	10	1	35	56
Holy Cross	12	3	9	0	2	0	0	7	.194	22	38	16	4	12	0	30	52
Championship: March 20, 2021 † indicates conference regular season champion * indicates conference tournament champion (Riley Trophy); Rankings: USCHO.com Top 20 Poll

== Schedule and results ==
Date	Time	Opponent^{#}	Rank^{#}	Site	TV	Decision	Result	Attendance	Record
Regular season
November 27	5:05 PM	at Robert Morris		Clearview Arena • Neville Township, Pennsylvania		Barczewski	W 5–2	0	1–0–0 (1–0–0)
November 28	7:05 PM	vs. Robert Morris		Clearview Arena • Neville Township, Pennsylvania		Barczewski	L 4–5	0	1–1–0 (1–1–0)
January 2	4:35 PM	vs. Mercyhurst		LECOM Harborcenter • Buffalo, New York		Ladd	W 3–2	0	2–1–0 (2–1–0)
January 3	3:00 PM	at Mercyhurst		Mercyhurst Ice Center • Erie, Pennsylvania		Ladd	W 3–0	127	3–1–0 (3–1–0)
January 30	5:00 PM	at RIT		Gene Polisseni Center • Henrietta, New York		Ladd	L 3–0	0	3–2–0 (3–2–0)
February 9	7:05 PM	at Mercyhurst		Mercyhurst Ice Center • Erie, Pennsylvania		Barczewski	W 3–1	0	4–2–0 (4–2–0)
February 12	7:05 PM	vs. Robert Morris		LECOM Harborcenter • Buffalo, New York		Ladd	W 5–3	0	5–2–0 (5–2–0)
February 13	7:05 PM	vs. Mercyhurst		LECOM Harborcenter • Buffalo, New York		Barczewski	W 3–0	0	6–2–0 (6–2–0)
February 16	7:05 PM	vs. Mercyhurst		LECOM Harborcenter • Buffalo, New York		Ladd	W 5–4 ^{OT}	0	7–2–0 (7–2–0)
February 19	9:05 PM	at Air Force		Cadet Ice Arena • Colorado Springs, Colorado		Barczewski	L 3–4 ^{OT}	100	7–3–0 (7–3–0)
February 20	7:00 PM	at Air Force		Cadet Ice Arena • Colorado Springs, Colorado		Ladd	L 1–5	100	7–4–0 (7–4–0)
February 26	7:30 PM	at Niagara		Dwyer Arena • Lewiston, New York		Barczewski	W 5–1	0	8–4–0 (8–4–0)
February 27	7:05 PM	vs. Niagara		LECOM Harborcenter • Buffalo, New York		Ladd	L 0–4	0	8–5–0 (8–5–0)
Atlantic Hockey Tournament
March 12	7:05 PM	vs. RIT*		LECOM Harborcenter • Buffalo, New York (Atlantic Hockey Quarterfinals game 1)		Barczewski	W 5–2	89	9–5–0
March 13	7:05 PM	vs. RIT*		LECOM Harborcenter • Buffalo, New York (Atlantic Hockey Quarterfinals game 2)		Barczewski	W 6–2	109	10–5–0
Canisius Won Series 2–0
March 19	7:05 PM	vs. #19 Army*		MassMutual Center • Springfield, Massachusetts (Atlantic Hockey Semifinals)		Barczewski	W 4–3 ^{OT}	0	11–5–0
March 20	7:00 PM	at #15 American International*		MassMutual Center • Springfield, Massachusetts (Atlantic Hockey Championship)		Barczewski	L 2–5	0	11–6–0
*Non-conference game. ^{#}Rankings from USCHO.com Poll. All times are in Eastern Time.

== Scoring statistics ==
Name	Position	Games	Goals	Assists	Points	PIM
Keaton Mastrodonato	C	17	9	9	18	4
Mitchell Martan	LW	16	6	9	15	21
Grant Meyer	RW	13	3	8	11	8
Lee Lapid	C	17	5	5	10	10
Simon Gravel	C/RW	13	5	4	9	0
Matt Long	F	15	3	6	9	10
Ryan Miotto	F	15	2	7	9	8
J. D. Pogue	LW	13	5	3	8	6
Logan Gestro	D	17	1	7	8	12
Max Kouznetsov	C/LW	17	4	3	7	8
Jami Virtanen	LW/RW	17	4	3	7	4
Austin Alger	F	17	3	4	7	6
David Melaragni	D	17	2	4	6	12
Cooper Haar	RW	13	1	4	5	6
Kevin Obssuth	LW	16	3	1	4	19
Jackson Decker	D	14	1	3	4	4
Derek Hamelin	D	15	0	4	4	4
Blake Wareham	C	17	0	4	4	0
Lincoln Erne	D	17	0	3	3	8
Niclas Puikkonen	C/W	6	1	1	2	0
Hudson Lambert	D	4	0	2	2	2
Jacob Barczewski	G	11	0	2	2	2
Jack Lyons	D	10	1	0	1	0
Tucker Weppner	G	1	0	0	0	0
Nick Parody	D	1	0	0	0	0
Connor Zilisch	F	2	0	0	0	0
David Baskerville	C	4	0	0	0	0
Matt Ladd	G	11	0	0	0	0
Bench			0	0	0	4
Total		17	59	96	155	154

== Goaltending statistics ==
Name	Games	Minutes	Wins	Losses	Ties	Goals against	Saves	Shut outs	SV %	GAA
Tucker Weppner	1	1:25	0	0	0	0	1	0	1.000	0.00
Jacob Barczewski	11	653	7	3	0	25	315	1	.926	2.30
Matt Ladd	7	376	4	3	0	18	189	1	.913	2.87
Empty Net	-	6	-	-	-	3	-	-	-	-
Total	17	1037	11	6	0	46	505	2	.917	2.66

== Rankings ==
Poll	Week																					
Poll	Pre	1	2	3	4	5	6	7	8	9	10	11	12	13	14	15	16	17	18	19	20	21 (Final)
USCHO.com	NR	NR	NR	NR	NR	NR	NR	NR	NR	NR	NR	NR	NR	NR	NR	NR	NR	NR	NR	NR	-	NR
USA Today	NR	NR	NR	NR	NR	NR	NR	NR	NR	NR	NR	NR	NR	NR	NR	NR	NR	NR	NR	NR	NR	NR

USCHO did not release a poll in week 20.

== Awards and honors ==
Player	Award	Ref
Jacob Barczewski	Atlantic Hockey Regular Season Goaltending Award	
Jacob Barczewski	Atlantic Hockey First Team	
Keaton Mastrodonato	Atlantic Hockey First Team	
