= Mogzon =

Mogzon may refer to:

- Mogzon, Khiloksky District, Zabaykalsky Krai, an urban-type settlement in Khiloksky District of Zabaykalsky Krai, Russia
- Mogzon, Krasnochikoysky District, Zabaykalsky Krai, a village (selo) in Krasnochikoysky District of Zabaykalsky Krai, Russia
