= Khilok (inhabited locality) =

Name of several Russian rural localities

Khilok (Russian: Хилок) is the name of several inhabited localities in Russia.

Urban localities

- Khilok, Zabaykalsky Krai, a town in Khiloksky District of Zabaykalsky Krai

Rural localities

- Khilok, Leningrad Oblast, a village in Osminskoye Settlement Municipal Formation of Luzhsky District of Leningrad Oblast
