= Glinka, Russia =

Glinka (Russian: Глинка) is the name of several rural localities in Russia:

- Glinka, Altai Krai, a settlement in Nikolsky Selsoviet of Sovetsky District of Altai Krai
- Glinka, Bryansk Oblast, a village in Seshchensky Selsoviet of Dubrovsky District of Bryansk Oblast
- Glinka, Chelyabinsk Oblast, a village in Voznesensky Selsoviet of Sosnovsky District of Chelyabinsk Oblast
- Glinka, Krasnoyarsk Krai, a village in Novoaltatsky Selsoviet of Sharypovsky District of Krasnoyarsk Krai
- Glinka, Leningrad Oblast, a village in Fedorovskoye Settlement Municipal Formation of Tosnensky District of Leningrad Oblast
- Glinka, Oryol Oblast, a village in Korsunsky Selsoviet of Verkhovsky District of Oryol Oblast
- Glinka, Smolensk Oblast, a selo in Glinkovskoye Rural Settlement of Glinkovsky District of Smolensk Oblast
- Glinka, Yaroslavl Oblast, a village in Selishchensky Rural Okrug of Borisoglebsky District of Yaroslavl Oblast
- Glinka, Zabaykalsky Krai, a selo in Khiloksky District of Zabaykalsky Krai
