= Mogzon, Khiloksky District, Zabaykalsky Krai =

Mogzon Могзон
- Urban-type settlement
- Interactive map of Mogzon
- Location of Mogzon Mogzon (Zabaykalsky Krai)
- Coordinates: 51°44′N 111°58′E
- Country: Russia
- Federal subject: Zabaykalsky Krai
- Administrative district: Khiloksky District

Population (2010 Census)
  - Total: 3,856
  - Estimate (1 January 2018): 3,410 (−11.6%)
- Time zone: UTC+9 (MSK+6)
- Postal code: 673240
- OKTMO ID: 76647154051

Mogzon (Russian: Могзон) is an urban locality (an urban-type settlement) in the eastern part of Khiloksky District of Zabaykalsky Krai, Russia, located at the confluence of the Khila and Khilok Rivers. Population: 3,856 (2010 census); 4,455 (2002 census); 6,368 (1989 Soviet census).

== History ==
Mogzonsky (Khilinsky) Arshan springs have been known to exist in this are since the end of the 19th century. A Buryat ulus of Mokzon (Мокзон) was located in the vicinity. In 1895, a railway station at Arshan (Аршан) was established. It was later moved to the area of modern Mogzon and given its present name. In 1938, it was granted urban-type settlement status.

== Economy ==
Mogzon's population growth and industrial development was and is tied to railway infrastructure. Mogzon is a railway station of the Trans-Siberian Railway.

== Culture ==
There is the museum of Mogzon's history founded in 1988.

== See also ==
- Zagarino
