= Glinka, Zabaykalsky Krai =

Rural locality in Khiloksky District, Zabaykalsky Krai, Russia

Coordinates: 51°25′55″N 110°02′43″E

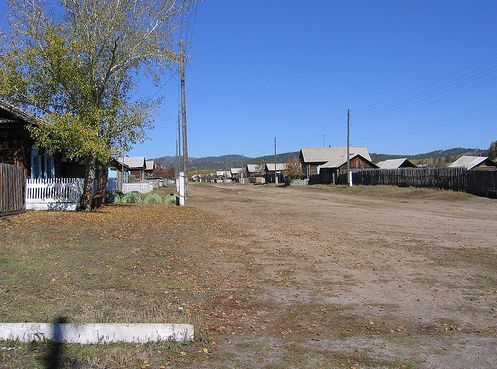
View of Glinka

Glinka (Russian: Глинка), also known as Kharchetoy (Харчетой) is a village (selo) in the west of Khiloksky District of Zabaykalsky Krai, located on the right bank of the Khilok River. Population: 421 (2002); 175 (1926). The majority of the population is employed in the railway industry and in agriculture.

The settlement was founded in the winter of 1895-1896 as a place for rail workers to live. In the decades to follow the railway station of Kharchetoy, a brick works, a windmill, a bakery, and two kolkhozes were built here.
