= 2023–24 Canisius Golden Griffins men's ice hockey season =

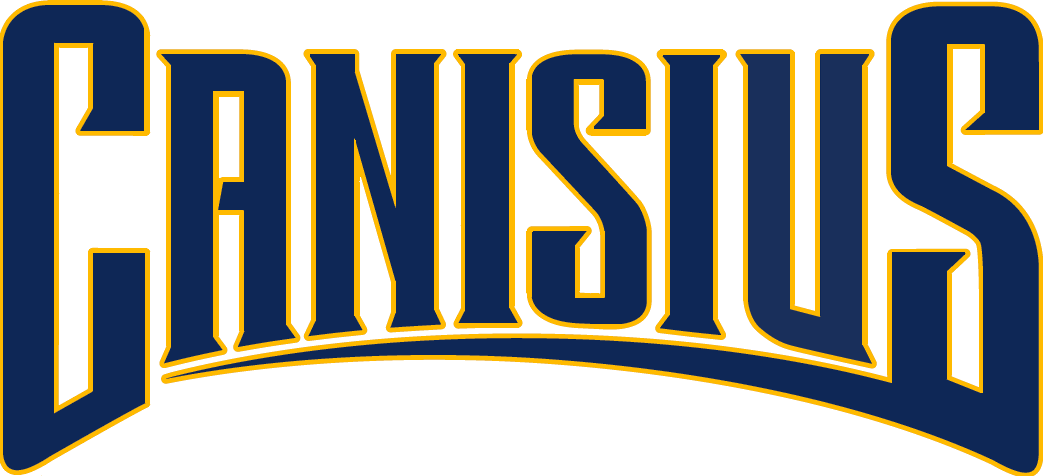
- Conference: 8th Atlantic Hockey
- Home ice: LECOM Harborcenter

Rankings
- USCHO: NR
- USA Hockey: NR

Record
- Overall: 12–21–4
- Conference: 10–12–4
- Home: 7–8–4
- Road: 5–13–0

Coaches and captains
- Head coach: Trevor Large
- Assistant coaches: Daniel Paille; Max Mobley
- Captain: Max Kouznetsov

The 2023–24 Canisius Golden Griffins men's ice hockey season was the 44th season of play for the program, the 26th at the Division I level, and the 21st in Atlantic Hockey. The Golden Griffins represented Canisius College, played their home games at the LECOM Harborcenter and were coached by Trevor Large in his 7th season.

== Season ==
Canisius entered the year looking for new leaders both on the offensive side of the puck and in goal. Graduate transfer David Fessenden ended up earning the lion's share of the starts for the Griffins but, as the season progressed, freshman Ethan Robertson was given more and more opportunities to get up to speed at the college level. Fessenden and Robertson played about even with one another, however, neither was particularly outstanding. The goaltending tandem saw the team's goals against average increase by more than half a point. The offense quickly found its new leader in Matteo Giampa and the freshmen ended the year leading the team in scoring by a wide margin.

The Golden Griffins started out the year with a 4-game losing streak and never seemed to recover completely. The team was able to produce some bright moments during the season, including a win over a ranked RIT squad, but they were never able to put a consistent stretch of good hockey together. Fortunately, the team ended the regular season in eighth place and managed to earn a home site in the opening round of the conference tournament.

The team opened their postseason with one of their best games of the year, scoring the first four goals of the match to knock out Mercyhurst with relative ease. The Griffins then built a 2-goal lead in their quarterfinal match with Holy Cross to give them a chance at a deep run. However, after that their goaltending troubles cropped up again and the team surrendered three goals in the second half of the match to lose 3–4. Robertson got the nod for game 2 and he showed out, stopping 40 shots in the game. Unfortunately, the team's offense was stymied by an equally impressive game from the opposing netminder and the match was sent into overtime. Canisius held on until the start of the second extra session when a defensive lapse allowed an unguarded Holy Cross player to score the winning goal.

Due to a snowstorm, the game against RIT scheduled on January 13 was postponed to a later date.

== Departures ==
Player	Position	Nationality	Cause
Jake Barczewski	Goaltender	United States	Graduate transfer to Michigan
Markus Boguslavsky	Forward	Canada	Graduation (retired)
Nick Bowman	Forward	United States	Graduation (retired)
Tyrell Buckley	Defenseman	Canada	Graduation (signed with EHF Passau Black Hawks)
Danny DiGrande	Forward	United States	Graduation (retired)
Lincoln Erne	Defenseman	United States	Graduation (signed with Tulsa Oilers)
Simon Gravel	Forward	Canada	Graduation (retired)
John Hawthorne	Goaltender	Canada	Graduation (retired)
Grant Loven	Forward	United States	Graduation (signed with Fayetteville Marksmen)
Keaton Mastrodonato	Forward	Canada	Graduation (signed with Texas Stars)
Ryan Miotto	Forward	Canada	Graduate transfer to Vermont
J. D. Pogue	Forward	Canada	Graduation (retired)

== Recruiting ==
Player	Position	Nationality	Age	Notes
Jack Budd	Defenseman	Canada	20	Toronto, ON
Powell Connor	Defenseman	Canada	23	Chilliwack, BC; transfer from Michigan State
Luke Farthing	Defenseman	United States	24	Stoutsville, OH; transfer from Ferris State
David Fessenden	Goaltender	United States	25	Parker, CO; graduate transfer from New Hampshire
Trey Funk	Forward	Canada	21	Redwood Meadows, AB
Matteo Giampa	Forward	Canada	20	Virgil, ON
Kyle Haskins	Forward	United States	23	Huntington, VT; transfer from Michigan State
Killian Kiecker-Olson	Forward	United States	22	Andover, MN; transfer from Maine
Robert Kincaid	Defenseman	Canada	21	Barrhead, AB; transfer from Maine
Griffin Loughran	Forward	United States	24	Orchard Park, NY; graduate transfer from Michigan State
Jackson Nieuwendyk	Forward	United States	21	Dallas, TX
Grant Porter	Forward	United States	21	Weston, MA; transfer from Providence
Ethan Robertson	Goaltender	Canada	21	Courtice, ON

== Roster ==
As of September 14, 2023.

No.	Nat.	Player	Class	Pos	Height	Weight	DoB	Hometown	Previous team	NHL rights
4	(United States)	Keegan Langefels	Junior	D	6' 0" (1.83 m)	185 lb (84 kg)	2001-02-02	Eden Prairie, Minnesota	New Mexico Ice Wolves (NAHL)	—
5	(Canada)	Robert Kincaid	Sophomore	D	6' 2" (1.88 m)	185 lb (84 kg)	2002-05-13	Barrhead, Alberta	Maine (HEA)	—
8	(Canada)	Matteo Giampa	Freshman	F	6' 1" (1.85 m)	190 lb (86 kg)	2003-09-03	Virgil, Ontario	Bonnyville Pontiacs (AJHL)	—
9	(United States)	Kyle Haskins	Senior	F	6' 0" (1.83 m)	185 lb (84 kg)	2000-02-16	Huntington, Vermont	Michigan State (Big Ten)	—
12	(United States)	Luke Farthing	Senior	D	5' 10" (1.78 m)	180 lb (82 kg)	1999-04-21	Stoutsville, Ohio	Ferris State (CCHA)	—
13	(United States)	Griffin Loughran	Senior (RS)	F	5' 6" (1.68 m)	141 lb (64 kg)	1998-11-13	West Seneca, New York	Michigan State (Big Ten)	—
14	(Canada)	Trey Funk	Freshman	F	6' 2" (1.88 m)	180 lb (82 kg)	2002-04-11	Redwood Meadows, Alberta	Bonnyville Pontiacs (AJHL)	—
15	(Canada)	Matt Vermaeten	Junior	F	5' 10" (1.78 m)	165 lb (75 kg)	2001-01-04	Ottawa, Ontario	Shreveport Mudbugs (NAHL)	—
20	(United States)	Randy Hernández	Senior	F	6' 0" (1.83 m)	190 lb (86 kg)	1999-01-12	Miami, Florida	Robert Morris (AHA)	—
23	(United States)	Cooper Haar	Senior	F	6' 3" (1.91 m)	205 lb (93 kg)	1999-04-26	Huntington Beach, California	Aberdeen Wings (NAHL)	—
24	(United States)	Jackson Decker	Senior	D	5' 11" (1.8 m)	170 lb (77 kg)	1999-03-19	Algonquin, Illinois	Chippewa Steel (NAHL)	—
25	(United States)	Jackson Nieuwendyk	Freshman	F	6' 1" (1.85 m)	185 lb (84 kg)	2002-09-04	Dallas, Texas	Penticton Vees (BCHL)	—
26	(Switzerland)	Stefano Bottini	Sophomore	F	6' 0" (1.83 m)	180 lb (82 kg)	2002-05-03	Lugano, Switzerland	Penticton Vees (BCHL)	—
27	(Canada)	Powell Connor	Senior	D	6' 2" (1.88 m)	190 lb (86 kg)	2000-05-04	Chilliwack, British Columbia	Michigan State (Big Ten)	—
30	(Canada)	Ethan Robertson	Freshman	G	6' 1" (1.85 m)	175 lb (79 kg)	2002-02-22	Courtice, Ontario	Austin Bruins (NAHL)	—
32	(United States)	Alex Houston	Junior	G	6' 2" (1.88 m)	190 lb (86 kg)	2002-03-21	Canton, Ohio	Cornwall Colts (CCHL)	—
37	(Canada)	Hunter Andrew	Sophomore	F	6' 0" (1.83 m)	165 lb (75 kg)	2002-10-25	Virden, Manitoba	Powell River Kings (BCHL)	—
41	(United States)	David Fessenden	Graduate	G	6' 6" (1.98 m)	250 lb (113 kg)	1998-04-30	Parker, Colorado	New Hampshire (HEA)	—
47	(United States)	Grant Porter	Sophomore	F	5' 11" (1.8 m)	180 lb (82 kg)	2002-02-21	Weston, Massachusetts	Providence (HEA)	—
53	(Canada)	Jack Budd	Freshman	D	6' 2" (1.88 m)	190 lb (86 kg)	2003-08-29	Toronto, Ontario	Bonnyville Pontiacs (AJHL)	—
55	(Canada)	Christian MacDougall	Sophomore	F	6' 0" (1.83 m)	180 lb (82 kg)	2001-03-13	Toronto, Ontario	Coquitlam Express (BCHL)	—
57	(United States)	Brenden Datema	Graduate	D	6' 5" (1.96 m)	220 lb (100 kg)	1999-03-18	Sterling Heights, Michigan	Michigan Tech (CCHA)	—
59	(United States)	David Melaragni	Graduate	D	6' 0" (1.83 m)	195 lb (88 kg)	1998-03-30	Philadelphia, Pennsylvania	Cowichan Valley Capitals (BCHL)	—
61	(United States)	Erik Urbank	Graduate	F	6' 2" (1.88 m)	195 lb (88 kg)	1999-03-28	Orchard Park, New York	Dartmouth (ECAC)	—
72	(United States)	Max Kouznetsov (C)	Senior	F	5' 11" (1.8 m)	175 lb (79 kg)	2000-12-06	Voorhees, New Jersey	Johnstown Tomahawks (NAHL)	—
73	(Canada)	Cody Schiavon	Senior	D	6' 0" (1.83 m)	200 lb (91 kg)	2000-07-01	West Kelowna, British Columbia	Vermont (HEA)	—
77	(Canada)	Jack Lyons	Senior	D	6' 1" (1.85 m)	205 lb (93 kg)	1999-07-04	Mississauga, Ontario	Oakville Blades (OJHL)	—
88	(United States)	Killian Kiecker-Olson	Sophomore	F	6' 1" (1.85 m)	195 lb (88 kg)	2001-01-19	Andover, Minnesota	Maine (HEA)	—
91	(Canada)	Alton McDermott	Junior	F	5' 10" (1.78 m)	175 lb (79 kg)	2001-06-04	Oakville, Ontario	Oakville Blades (OJHL)	—
92	(Canada)	Oliver Tarr	Sophomore	F	6' 0" (1.83 m)	185 lb (84 kg)	2002-01-20	Uxbridge, Ontario	Haliburton County Huskies (OJHL)	—
94	(Canada)	Hudson Lambert	Graduate	D	6' 0" (1.83 m)	190 lb (86 kg)	1998-08-17	Richmond Hill, Ontario	Brampton Admirals (OJHL)	—

== Standings ==
2023–24 Atlantic Hockey Standings
	Conference record										Overall record					
	GP	W	L	T	OW	OL	SW	PTS	GF	GA	GP	W	L	T	GF	GA
#17 RIT †*	26	18	7	1	3	2	0	54	102	64	40	27	11	2	156	96
Holy Cross	26	13	10	3	0	3	1	46	78	62	39	21	14	4	116	93
Sacred Heart	26	14	10	2	2	2	1	45	75	70	36	14	19	3	91	113
Air Force	26	15	10	1	3	0	1	44	88	75	38	18	19	1	115	119
American International	26	12	10	4	1	1	2	42	79	68	40	20	16	4	119	111
Bentley	26	12	12	2	1	2	2	41	69	58	35	16	17	2	95	82
Niagara	26	13	10	3	3	1	1	41	78	79	39	18	18	3	111	122
Canisius	26	10	12	4	2	1	0	33	73	87	37	12	21	4	103	126
Mercyhurst	26	7	15	4	0	1	4	30	77	91	35	9	22	4	98	126
Army	26	8	16	2	0	1	1	28	66	96	35	10	23	2	93	139
Robert Morris	26	7	17	2	0	1	1	25	60	95	39	11	25	3	94	142
Championship: March 23, 2024 † indicates conference regular season champion (DeGregorio Trophy) * indicates conference tournament champion (Riley Trophy); Rankings: USCHO.com Top 20 Poll

== Schedule and results ==
Date	Time	Opponent^{#}	Rank^{#}	Site	TV	Decision	Result	Attendance	Record
Exhibition
October 8	3:00 pm	at Niagara*		Dwyer Arena • Lewiston, New York (Rivalry, Exhibition)	FloHockey	Fessenden	W 5–2	28	
Regular Season
October 13	7:00 pm	at Miami*		Steve Cady Arena • Oxford, Ohio		Fessenden	L 2–4	1,534	0–1–0
October 14	7:00 pm	at Miami*		Steve Cady Arena • Oxford, Ohio		Fessenden	L 1–4	1,524	0–2–0
October 19	7:00 pm	at #8 Michigan State*		Munn Ice Arena • East Lansing, Michigan		Fessenden	L 3–6	5,992	0–3–0
October 20	7:00 pm	at #8 Michigan State*		Munn Ice Arena • East Lansing, Michigan		Robertson	L 3–4	6,492	0–4–0
November 3	6:00 pm	Holy Cross		LECOM Harborcenter • Buffalo, New York	FloHockey	Robertson	W 5–3	826	1–4–0 (1–0–0)
November 4	7:00 pm	Holy Cross		LECOM Harborcenter • Buffalo, New York	FloHockey	Fessenden	T 3–3 ^{SOL}	1,152	1–4–1 (1–0–1)
November 10	7:00 pm	at Sacred Heart		Martire Family Arena • Fairfield, Connecticut	FloHockey	Robertson	L 1–4	2,527	1–5–1 (1–1–1)
November 11	7:00 pm	at Sacred Heart		Martire Family Arena • Fairfield, Connecticut	FloHockey	Fessenden	L 2–3	2,493	1–6–1 (1–2–1)
November 17	7:00 pm	at Army		Tate Rink • West Point, New York	FloHockey	Fessenden	W 6–4	1,600	2–6–1 (2–2–1)
November 18	7:00 pm	at Army		Tate Rink • West Point, New York	FloHockey	Fessenden	L 1–2	1,670	2–7–1 (2–3–1)
November 21	7:00 pm	Robert Morris		LECOM Harborcenter • Buffalo, New York	FloHockey	Fessenden	W 5–1	790	3–7–1 (3–3–1)
November 24	1:00 pm	Air Force		LECOM Harborcenter • Buffalo, New York	FloHockey	Fessenden	W 3–1	731	4–7–1 (4–3–1)
November 25	1:00 pm	Air Force		LECOM Harborcenter • Buffalo, New York	FloHockey	Fessenden	T 2–2 ^{SOL}	621	4–7–2 (4–3–2)
December 1	7:00 pm	Mercyhurst		LECOM Harborcenter • Buffalo, New York	FloHockey	Fessenden	T 3–3 ^{SOL}	719	4–7–3 (4–3–3)
December 2	7:00 pm	at Mercyhurst		Mercyhurst Ice Center • Erie, Pennsylvania	FloHockey	Fessenden	L 1–5	635	4–8–3 (4–4–3)
December 15	7:00 pm	American International		LECOM Harborcenter • Buffalo, New York	FloHockey	Robertson	W 3–2	982	5–8–3 (5–4–3)
December 16	5:00 pm	American International		LECOM Harborcenter • Buffalo, New York	FloHockey	Robertson	L 1–6	652	5–9–3 (5–5–3)
December 29	3:00 pm	Rensselaer*		LECOM Harborcenter • Buffalo, New York	FloHockey	Fessenden	L 3–6	719	5–10–3
December 30	1:00 pm	Rensselaer*		LECOM Harborcenter • Buffalo, New York	FloHockey	Robertson	L 1–2	735	5–11–3
January 5	7:00 pm	St. Lawrence*		LECOM Harborcenter • Buffalo, New York	FloHockey	Robertson	W 5–1	792	6–11–3
January 6	7:00 pm	Clarkson*		LECOM Harborcenter • Buffalo, New York	FloHockey	Fessenden	L 3–4	1,332	6–12–3
January 11	7:00 pm	Mercyhurst		LECOM Harborcenter • Buffalo, New York	FloHockey	Fessenden	W 4–1	569	7–12–3 (6–5–3)
January 16	7:05 pm	at #20 RIT		Gene Polisseni Center • Henrietta, New York	FloHockey	Fessenden	W 3–2 ^{OT}	2,038	8–12–3 (7–5–3)
January 19	7:00 pm	Niagara		LECOM Harborcenter • Buffalo, New York (Rivalry)	FloHockey	Fessenden	L 2–4	1,161	8–13–3 (7–6–3)
January 20	7:00 pm	at Niagara		Dwyer Arena • Lewiston, New York (Rivalry)	FloHockey	Robertson	L 4–6	902	8–14–3 (7–7–3)
January 26	9:00 pm	at Air Force		Cadet Ice Arena • Colorado Springs, Colorado	FloHockey	Robertson	L 1–5	2,318	8–15–3 (7–8–3)
January 27	7:00 pm	at Air Force		Cadet Ice Arena • Colorado Springs, Colorado	FloHockey, Altitude	Robertson	W 5–3	2,424	9–15–3 (8–8–3)
February 6	6:00 pm	Niagara		LECOM Harborcenter • Buffalo, New York (Rivalry)	FloHockey	Robertson	L 2–3	792	9–16–3 (8–9–3)
February 9	7:00 pm	Bentley		LECOM Harborcenter • Buffalo, New York	FloHockey	Robertson	L 0–3	898	9–17–3 (8–10–3)
February 10	6:00 pm	Bentley		LECOM Harborcenter • Buffalo, New York	FloHockey	Fessenden	T 2–2 ^{SOL}	890	9–17–4 (8–10–4)
February 16	7:00 pm	at Robert Morris		Clearview Arena • Neville Township, Pennsylvania	FloHockey	Fessenden	W 5–3	619	10–17–4 (9–10–4)
February 17	5:00 pm	at Robert Morris		Clearview Arena • Neville Township, Pennsylvania	FloHockey, SNP	Robertson	W 5–4 ^{OT}	1,008	11–17–4 (10–10–4)
February 23	7:05 pm	at #20 RIT		Gene Polisseni Center • Henrietta, New York	FloHockey	Fessenden	L 2–9	4,233	11–18–4 (10–11–4)
February 24	7:00 pm	#20 RIT		LECOM Harborcenter • Buffalo, New York	FloHockey	Robertson	L 2–3	1,335	11–19–4 (10–12–4)
Atlantic Hockey Tournament
March 2	6:05 pm	Mercyhurst*		LECOM Harborcenter • Buffalo, New York (First Round)	FloHockey	Fessenden	W 5–2	388	12–19–4
March 8	7:00 pm	at Holy Cross*		Hart Center • Worcester, Massachusetts (Quarterfinal Game 1)	FloHockey	Fessenden	L 3–4	444	12–20–4
March 9	7:00 pm	at Holy Cross*		Hart Center • Worcester, Massachusetts (Quarterfinal Game 2)	FloHockey	Robertson	L 1–2 ^{2OT}	559	12–21–4
*Non-conference game. ^{#}Rankings from USCHO.com Poll. All times are in Eastern Time. Source:

== Scoring statistics ==
Name	Position	Games	Goals	Assists	Points	PIM
Matteo Giampa	F	36	18	17	35	8
Max Kouznetsov	C/LW	36	8	15	23	39
Randy Hernández	RW	37	8	14	22	4
Jackson Decker	D	35	7	10	17	28
Kyle Haskins	F	35	4	11	15	10
Oliver Tarr	RW	37	7	8	15	23
Griffin Loughran	F	21	6	9	15	78
David Melaragni	D	32	2	11	13	16
Erik Urbank	RW	34	4	9	13	37
Trey Funk	F	34	7	6	13	6
Matt Vermaeten	F	30	7	5	12	20
Stefano Bottini	LW/RW	23	4	6	10	10
Brenden Datema	D	35	1	8	9	30
Cody Schiavon	D	28	3	5	8	21
Jackson Nieuwendyk	F	34	2	5	7	16
Grant Porter	F	16	4	3	7	4
Powell Connor	D	35	1	6	7	39
Cooper Haar	LW	25	1	5	6	16
Killian Kiecker-Olson	F	21	2	3	5	15
Jack Budd	D	15	2	2	4	6
Luke Farthing	D	15	0	4	4	6
Hudson Lambert	D	13	1	2	3	6
Robert Kincaid	D	18	2	1	3	4
David Fessenden	G	22	0	3	3	8
Jack Lyons	D	26	1	1	2	10
Christian MacDougall	F	7	1	0	1	4
Hunter Andrew	F	16	0	0	0	4
Keegan Langefels	D	7	0	0	0	2
Alex Houston	G	1	0	0	0	0
Ethan Robertson	G	19	0	0	0	0
Total			118	204	322	539

== Goaltending statistics ==
Name	Games	Minutes	Wins	Losses	Ties	Goals against	Saves	Shut outs	SV %	GAA
Alex Houston	5	0:13	0	0	0	0	1	0	1.000	0.00
Ethan Robertson	20	979:29	5	10	0	53	498	0	.904	3.25
David Fessenden	22	1254:42	7	11	4	70	610	0	.897	3.35
Empty Net	-	32:16	-	-	-	3	-	-	-	-
Total	37	2266:40	12	21	4	126	1109	0	.898	3.34

== Rankings ==
Poll	Week																										
Poll	Pre	1	2	3	4	5	6	7	8	9	10	11	12	13	14	15	16	17	18	19	20	21	22	23	24	25	26 (Final)
USCHO.com	NR	NR	NR	NR	NR	NR	NR	NR	NR	NR	NR	–	NR	NR	NR	NR	NR	NR	NR	NR	NR	NR	NR	NR	NR	–	NR
USA Hockey	NR	NR	NR	NR	NR	NR	NR	NR	NR	NR	NR	NR	–	NR	NR	NR	NR	NR	NR	NR	NR	NR	NR	NR	NR	NR	NR

Note: USCHO did not release a poll in weeks 11 and 25.
Note: USA Hockey did not release a poll in week 12.

== Awards and honors ==
Player	Award	Ref
Matteo Giampa	Atlantic Hockey Rookie of the Year	
Matteo Giampa	Atlantic Hockey Second Team	
Matteo Giampa	Atlantic Hockey Rookie Team	
