= Avdotia Pavlovna Glinka =

Russian mystic (1795–1863)

Avdotia Glinka
- Авдотья Глинка
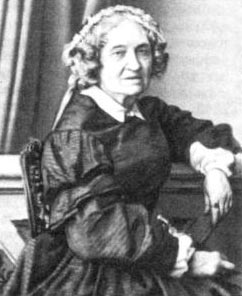
- Born: Avdotia Pavlovna Golenichtcheva-Koutouzova; 7 July 1795; Saint Petersburg
- Died: 26 July 1863 (aged 68); Tver
- Occupations: Writer; poet; translator
- Spouse: Fyodor Glinka
- Writing career
- Years active: 1832–1863

Avdotia Pavlovna Glinka (Russian: Авдотья Павловна Глинка), née Golenichtcheva-Koutouzova (Голенищева-Кутузова; 1795–1863) was a Russian spiritual writer, poet and translator. She was married to writer and mystic Fyodor Glinka. Their grand-daughter was the occultist anti-semite Yuliana Glinka.

== Life ==
Avdotia Pavlovna Golenishtchev-Kutuzo was born on July 7, 1795 in Saint Petersburg. She was home-educated and lived in the Kuznetsovo estate in Bezhetsky District, Tver Oblast.

In 1831 she married the poet Fyodor Glinka, a cousin of the composer Mikhail Glinka. In 1832 she moved with him to Orel. In 1835 they moved to Moscow, and in 1853 to Saint Petersburg. In 1862 the couple moved back to Tver.

Her 1832 translation of Friedrich Schiller brought her notice. She published in the newspaper Northern Bee and the magazines Mayak [Lighthouse] and Strannik [Wanderer]. Countess Polina (1856) was a novel of manners. Leonid Stepanovich and Liudmilla Sergeeva (1856) was one of the first anti-nihilistic novels in Russia.

In 1859 Glinka addressed a letter to Alexander Herzen, criticizing what she called a propaganda of "chaos and destruction", and calling for a return to Russian Orthodoxy. Herzen published a response, 'Answer to a Russian Lady', in the newspaper Kolokol.

Glinka died on July 26, 1863 in Tver.

== Works ==
- Pesnia o kolokole [Song of the Bell], translation of Schiller's Das Lied von der Glocke, 1832.
- Zhizn' presviatoi devy [The Life of the Most Holy Virgin], 1840. In verse, sixteen editions up to 1915.
- Gibel' ot pustogo chvanstva [The Ruin of Useless Arrogance], 1852.
- Tol'ko tri nedeli [Only Three Weeks], 1851.
- Grafinia Polina, [Countess Polina], 1856.
- Leonid Stepanovich and Liudmilla Sergeeva, 1856.
- Katia, 1858.
- Stikhotvoreniia Shillera. Zum Dichters 100 Jahrigem Geburtsfeste, 1859.
