= Trevor Large =

Canadian ice hockey player and coach

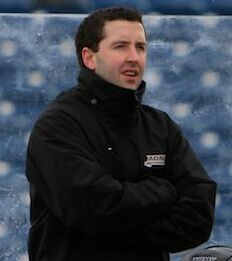
- Large with Army in 2011

Current position
- Title: Head coach
- Team: Canisius
- Conference: Atlantic Hockey America
- Record: 133–165–28 (.451)

Biographical details
- Born: June 28, 1980 (age 46); Brampton, Ontario, Canada

Playing career
- 1997–2000: Brampton Capitals
- 2000–2004: Ferris State
- Position: Right wing

Coaching career (HC unless noted)
- 2006–2008: American International (assistant)
- 2008–2014: Army (assistant)
- 2014–2017: Canisius (assistant)
- 2017–present: Canisius

Head coaching record
- Overall: 133–165–29 (.451)
- Tournaments: 0–1 (.000)

Accomplishments and honors

Championships
- 2023 Atlantic Hockey tournament

Trevor Norman Large (born June 8, 1980) is a Canadian former ice hockey player who is currently the head coach at Canisius.

== Career ==
Large played his college hockey at Ferris State for the "legendary" Bob Daniels. He played for years for the Bulldogs and was part of the programs first ever NCAA tournament appearance in 2002–03. After graduating with a degree in computer information systems Large returned to the college ranks in 2006 simultaneously earning his MBA and serving as an assistant coach at American International. Once his graduate career was completed he moved to West Point to become an assistant with Army's hockey team. He served in that capacity for six seasons before moving across-state to Buffalo to become an assistant coach for Canisius under Dave Smith. Large remained at that post until Smith left to accept the top job at Rensselaer and less than a month later was named as Smith's replacement.

== Head coaching record ==
Record table
Season	Team	Overall	Conference	Standing	Postseason
Canisius Golden Griffins (Atlantic Hockey) (2017–2024)
2017–18	Canisius	19–17–2	17–11–0	2nd	Atlantic Hockey Semifinals
2018–19	Canisius	12–20–5	8–16–4	11th	Atlantic Hockey First Round
2019–20	Canisius	10–20–6	9–13–6	9th	Atlantic Hockey First Round
2020–21	Canisius	11–6–0	8–5–0	4th	Atlantic Hockey Runner-Up
2021–22	Canisius	16–16–3	13–11–2	2nd	Atlantic Hockey Quarterfinals
2022–23	Canisius	20–19–3	13–10–3	4th	NCAA Regional Semifinal
2023–24	Canisius	12–21–4	10–12–4	8th	Atlantic Hockey First Round
Canisius:		100–119–23	78–78–16		
Canisius Golden Griffins (AHA) (2024–present)
2024–25	Canisius	12–23–2	11–13–2	6th	AHA Quarterfinals
2025–26	Canisius	17–16–2	12–12–2	7th	AHA First Round
2026–27	Canisius	4–7–2	1–3–1		
Canisius:		33–46–6	24–28–5		
Total:		133–165–29 (.451)			
National champion Postseason invitational champion Conference regular season champion Conference regular season and conference tournament champion Division regular season champion Division regular season and conference tournament champion Conference tournament champion
