= Hlinka =

Hlinka (feminine Hlinková) is a Czech and Slovak surname and toponym.

== People ==
- Andrej Hlinka, Slovak politician and Catholic priest
- Ivan Hlinka, Czech ice hockey player and coach
- Jaroslav Hlinka, Czech ice hockey player
- Jiri Hlinka, Norwegian professor and piano teacher
- Marek Hlinka, Slovak footballer
- Martin Hlinka, Slovak ice hockey player
- Michal Hlinka, Czech ice hockey player
- Miroslav Hlinka, Slovak ice hockey player
- Peter Hlinka, Slovak footballer

=== Fictional characters ===
- Paulina Hlinka, a fictional character in the Bert Diaries

== Places ==
- Hlinka (Bruntál District), a municipality and village in the Czech Republic

== See also ==
- Glinka (disambiguation)
