= Sergey Glinka =

Russian writer (1774–1847)

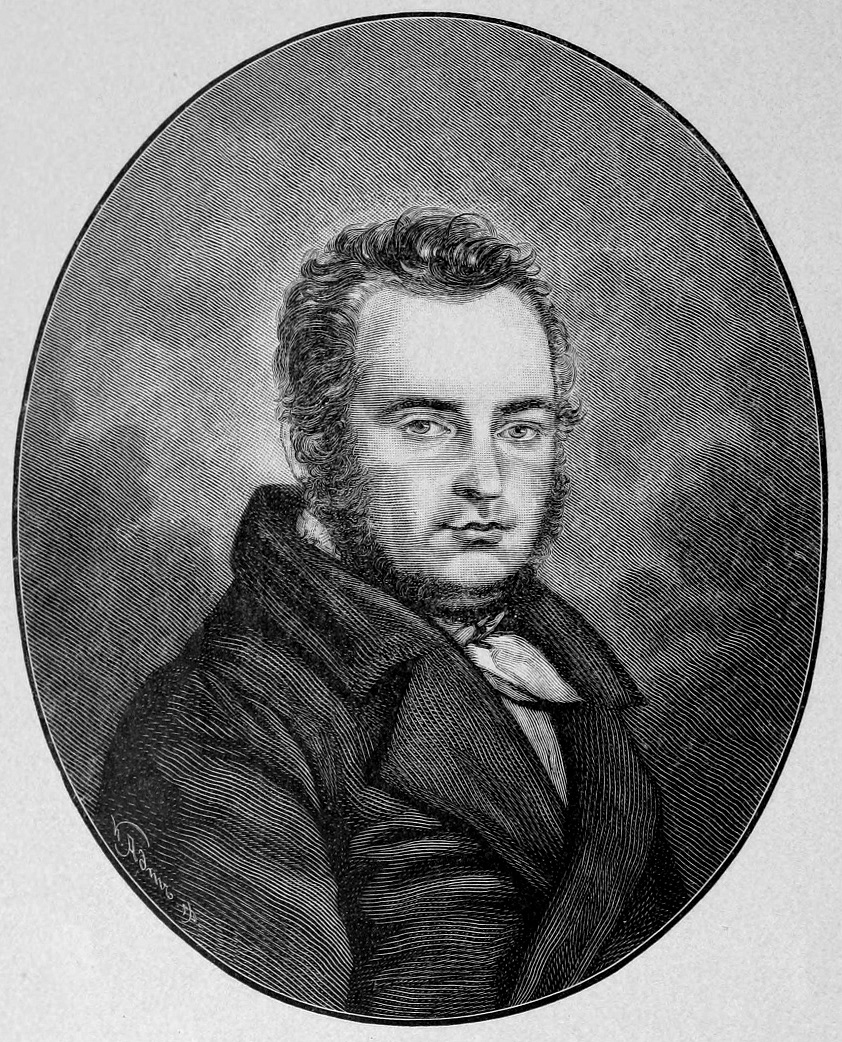
Sergey Glinka.

Sergei Nikolayevich Glinka (Russian: Серге́й Никола́евич Гли́нка, IPA: [sʲɪrˈɡʲej nʲɪkɐˈlajɪvʲɪdʑ ˈɡlʲinkə]; 1774–1847) was a minor Russian author of the Romantic period.

== Biography ==
Glinka was the elder brother of Fedor Nikolaevich Glinka. He was born at Sutoki, Smolensk Governorate in 1774. In 1796 he entered the Russian army, but after three years service retired with the rank of major. He afterwards employed himself in the education of youth and in literary pursuits, first in Ukraine, and subsequently at Moscow, where he died in 1847.

== Works ==
Glinka's poems are spirited and patriotic; he wrote also several dramatic pieces, and translated Edward Young's Night Thoughts. Among his numerous prose works the most important from an historical point of view are:

- Russkoe Chtenie (Historical Memorials of Russia in the 18th and 19th Centuries; 2 vols., 1845)
- Istoriya Rossii, etc. (History of Russia for the use of Youth; 10 vols., 1817–1819; 2nd ed. 1822, 3rd ed. 1824)
- Istoriya Armyan, etc. (History of the Migration of the Armenians of Azerbaijan from Turkey to Russia; 1831)
- contributions to Russky Vyestnik (Russian Messenger), a monthly periodical, edited by him (1808–1820)
