= Yuliana Glinka =

Russian occultist (1844–1918)

- Юлиана Глинка
- Born: 1844; Oryol, Russian Empire
- Died: 1918 (aged 73–74)

Yuliana Dmitrievna Glinka (Russian: Юлиана Дмитриевна Глинка; 1844–1918) was a Russian occultist who became associated with theosophy and claims of a Jewish conspiracy.

== Life ==
Glinka was born to a prominent family in Orel, Russia. Her grandfather, Colonel Fyodor Nikolaevich Glinka was investigated as a leader of "a secret society of mystics" during Prince Alexander Nikolayevich Golitsyn's investigation of masonic lodges following the Decembrist uprising of 1825. Fyodor Tolstoy testified that although he was a mystic he was "a loyal officer of the Empire".

Yuliana's father, Dmitri Feodorovich Glinka, became a general and entered the diplomatic service. As a result, she spent time in Portugal and Brazil where her father was posted. She probably became interested in spiritualism while in Brazil. She lived in Rio de Janeiro, and at Petropolis, in the Serra dos Órgãos, home of Emperor Dom Pedro II of Brazil. With her father and sisters she traveled with Dom Pedro to Minas Gerais, visiting Ouro Preto and Diamantina, both very old cities with mystical associations.

In Brazil, Yuliana became acquainted with Candomblé, a Brazilian version of Caribbean Santería. She also read about the Fox sisters and their encounters with "the Spirit World" in New York, in the United States.

Family connections got Yuliana a position as maid of honour to Tsaritsa Maria Alexandrovna. Yuliana spent little time at Tsarskoe Selo, home of the Romanovs. She spent most of her time in Paris where she became involved with the theosophists and other occultists. Through her uncle, General Pyotr Vasilyevich Orzhevsky (ru), she became involved with Pyotr Rachkovsky of the Okhrana, the Imperial Russian secret service.
