= Fyodor Glinka =

Russian poet and author (1786–1880)

- Фёдор Глинка
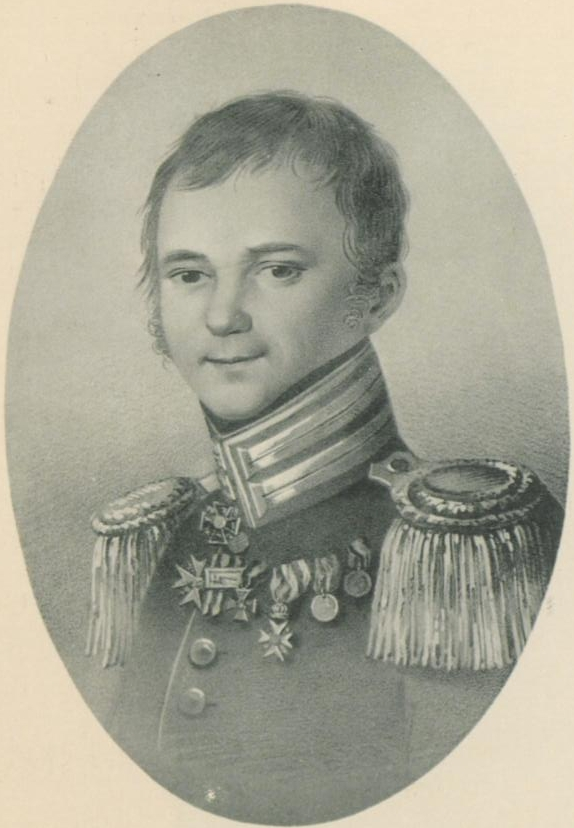
- Born: 1786
- Died: 1880 (aged 93–94)
- Occupations: Poet; author
- Spouse: Avdotia Glinka

Fyodor Nikolaevich Glinka (Russian: Фёдор Николаевич Глинка, IPA: [ˈfʲɵdər nʲɪkɐˈlajɪvʲɪdʑ ˈɡlʲinkə]; 1786–1880) was a Russian poet and author.

== Biography ==
Glinka was born at Sutoki, Dukhovshchinsky Uyezd, Smolensk Governorate in 1786, and was specially educated for the army. In 1803 he obtained a commission as an officer, and two years later took part in the Austrian campaign. His tastes for literary pursuits, however, soon induced him to leave the service, whereupon he withdrew to his estates in the government of Smolensk, and subsequently devoted most of his time to studying or travelling about Russia.

Upon the Napoleon's invasion of Russia in 1812, he re-entered the Russian army, and remained in active service until the end of the campaign in 1814. Upon the elevation of Count Miloradovich to the military governorship of St. Petersburg, Glinka was appointed colonel under his command.

After the Decembrist Revolt Glinka was suspected of revolutionary tendencies. He was banished to Petrozavodsk, but he nevertheless retained his honorary post of president of the Society of the Friends of Russian Literature, and was after a time allowed to return to St. Petersburg. He married the writer Avdotia Glinka in 1831. He later retired completely from public life and died on his estates at the age of 93.

== Works ==
Glinka's martial songs have special reference to the Russian military campaigns of his time. He is also known as the author of the descriptive poem Karelia (1830), and of a metrical paraphrase of the book of Job, which was praised by D.S. Mirsky as the finest religious poetry in the language. His fame as a military author is chiefly due to his Pisma Russkago Ofitsera ("Letters of a Russian Officer") (8 vols., 1815–1816). His most infamous work which remains exceedingly rare was his contribution of an allegory to the first Swedish translation of John William Polidori's Vampyre (Vampyren) credited to Lord Byron. (Published by Jakob Simelius of Helsinki in 1824) which was marks the first ever appearance of the vampire story in Nordic literature.

== Family ==
Glinka was the younger brother of Sergy Nikolaevich Glinka.
