= Battle of the Bridge (Canisius–Niagara) =

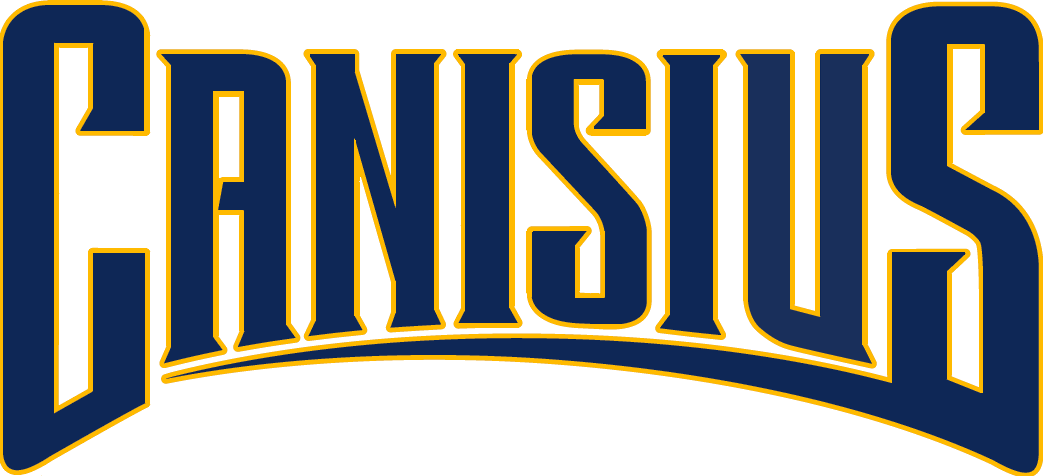
- Canisius Golden Griffins Niagara Purple Eagles
- Sport: Multi-sport
- First meeting: 2006
- Trophy: Canal Cup

Statistics
- All-time series: Canisius leads, 14–6
- Longest win streak: Canisius, 10 (2010–2019)
- Current win streak: Niagara, 1 (2026–present)

Locations in New York

The Battle of the Bridge is the name of the all-sports rivalry between the Canisius Golden Griffins and the Niagara Purple Eagles. Both schools are members of the Metro Atlantic Athletic Conference. The two teams compete every school year in 14 sports; men's baseball, men's and women's basketball, men's and women's cross country, men's golf, men's ice hockey, women's lacrosse, men's and women's soccer, women's softball, men's and women's swimming & diving, and women's volleyball. The overall winner of the annual series receives the Canal Cup trophy. The two long-time Western New York rivals created the trophy in 2007 to enhance the historic rivalry between the two schools. The name of the series is a reference to the Grand Island Bridge, which each team crosses when traveling along I-190 to the other's campus. The name of the trophy is a reference to the Erie Canal, which separates Erie County, where Canisius is located, and Niagara County, where Niagara is located.

== Overall results ==
Season	Winner	Overall score		Series
Season	Winner	Canisius	Niagara	Series
2006–07	Niagara	10	24	Niagara 1–0
2007–08	Canisius	21	13	Tied 1–1
2008–09	Canisius	23	11	Canisius 2–1
2009–10	Niagara	15	17	Tied 2–2
2010–11	Canisius	20	13	Canisius 3–2
2011–12	Canisius	18.5	14.5	Canisius 4–2
2012–13	Canisius	21	12	Canisius 5–2
2013–14	Canisius	23.5	9.5	Canisius 6–2
2014–15	Canisius	21	7	Canisius 7–2
2015–16	Canisius	20.5	7.5	Canisius 8–2
2016–17	Canisius	30	8	Canisius 9–2
2017–18	Canisius	27	9	Canisius 10–2
2018–19	Canisius	19	11	Canisius 11–2
2019–20	Canisius	16	10	Canisius 12–2
2020–21	Niagara	10	16	Canisius 12–3
2021–22	Niagara	13	23	Canisius 12–4
2022–23	Canisius	19	17	Canisius 13–4
2023–24	Niagara	10	25	Canisius 13–5
2024–25	Canisius	18	17	Canisius 14–5
2025–26	Niagara	12	24	Canisius 14–6
Total	19* seasons	367.5	288.5	Canisius 14–6
