= Martin Hlinka =

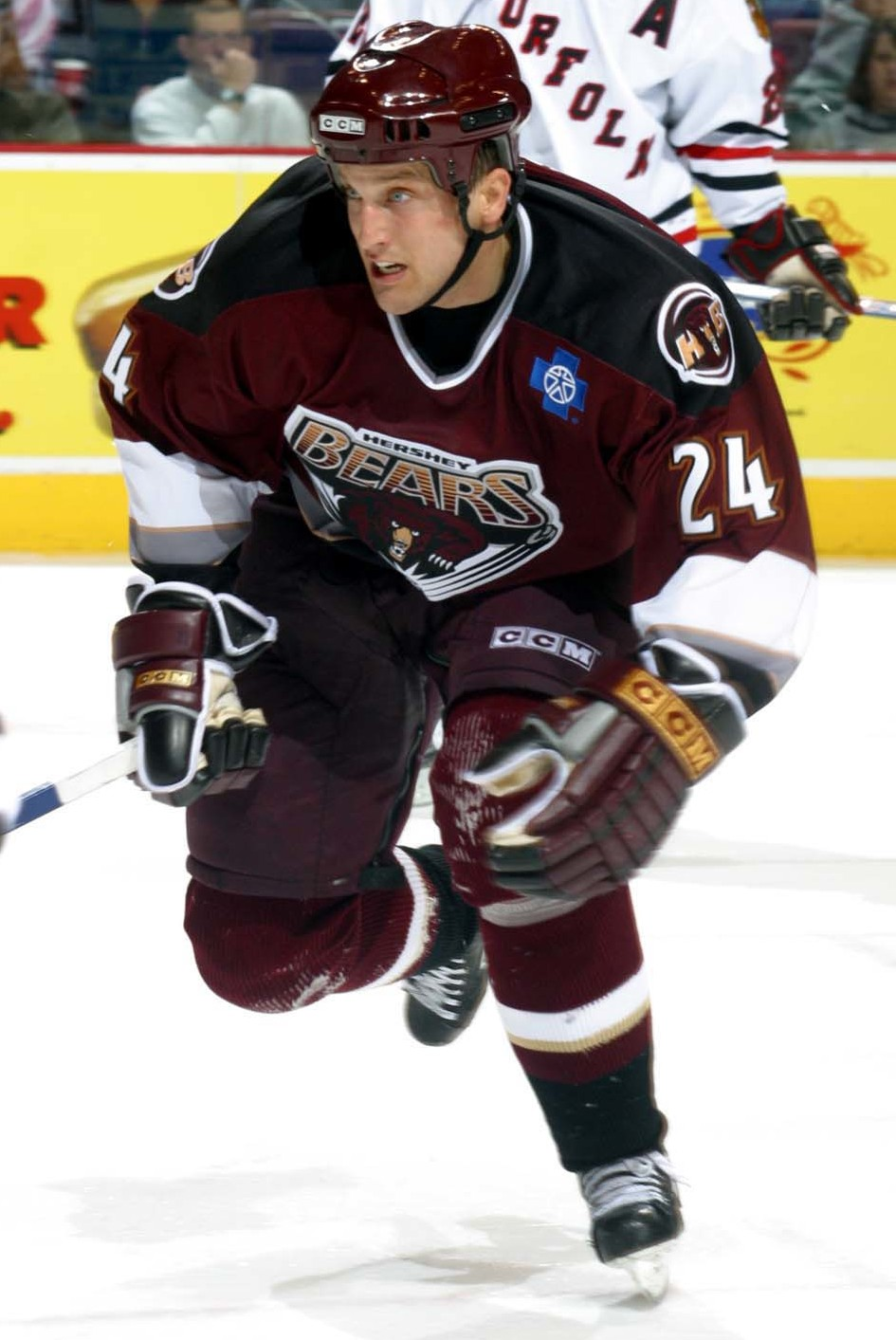
- Hlinka with the Hershey Bears in 2004
- Born: 25 September 1976 (age 50) Bratislava, Czechoslovakia
- Height: 6 ft 0 in (183 cm)
- Weight: 198 lb (90 kg; 14 st 2 lb)
- Position: Forward
- Shot: Left
- Played for: AHL; Hershey Bears; Portland Pirates; IHL; Chicago Wolves; UHL; Quad City Mallards; CHL; St. Charles Chill; DEL; Hannover Scorpions; Kassel Huskies
- NHL draft: Undrafted
- Playing career: 1999–2014

Martin Hlinka
Current position
- Title: Director of Youth Hockey
- Team: Seattle Kraken
- Conference: Western

Biographical details
- Education: Augsburg University

Coaching career (HC unless noted)
- 2016–2018: RB Hockey Juniors (assistant)
- 2018–2019: RB Hockey Academy (assistant)
- 2019–2021: Canisius (assistant)

Martin Hlinka (born 25 September 1976) is a Slovak former professional ice hockey player. He last played for the St. Charles Chill in the Central Hockey League (CHL). In April 2021 he was announced as Director of Youth Hockey for the Seattle Kraken. Prior to joining the Kraken he served as an assistant coach for the Canisius Golden Griffins in the AHA conference of the NCAA, following spells coaching clubs in Russia and Austria, and with youth international teams of Belarus and Poland.

== Career statistics ==
			Regular season					Playoffs
Season	Team	League	GP	G	A	Pts	PIM	GP	G	A	Pts	PIM
1995–96	Augsburg University	NCAA III	15	6	5	11	8	—	—	—	—	—
1996–97	Augsburg University	NCAA III	24	14	23	37	19	—	—	—	—	—
1997–98	Augsburg University	NCAA III	24	14	30	44	20	—	—	—	—	—
1998–99	Augsburg University	NCAA III	22	6	27	33	24	—	—	—	—	—
1998–99	Quad City Mallards	UHL	2	1	1	2	0	1	0	0	0	0
1999–00	Quad City Mallards	UHL	71	21	46	67	74	14	0	7	7	24
1999–00	Chicago Wolves	IHL	1	0	0	0	0	—	—	—	—	—
2000–01	Portland Pirates	AHL	60	13	19	32	50	3	1	2	3	2
2000–01	Quad City Mallards	UHL	11	4	10	14	0	5	1	1	2	11
2001–02	Portland Pirates	AHL	50	5	18	23	34	—	—	—	—	—
2003–04	Quad City Mallards	UHL	38	19	20	39	67	3	0	2	2	4
2003–04	Hershey Bears	AHL	30	6	10	16	26	—	—	—	—	—
2004–05	Hershey Bears	AHL	52	5	22	27	28	—	—	—	—	—
2005–06	Kassel Huskies	DEL	46	16	21	37	48	—	—	—	—	—
2006–07	Hannover Scorpions	DEL	52	12	14	26	70	6	1	2	3	6
2007–08	Hannover Scorpions	DEL	54	5	21	26	126	3	0	1	1	4
2008–09	Hannover Scorpions	DEL	51	6	13	19	84	10	2	0	2	35
2009–10	Hannover Scorpions	DEL	56	4	21	25	54	11	1	2	3	0
2010–11	Hannover Scorpions	DEL	52	7	17	24	28	5	3	2	5	12
2011–12	Hannover Scorpions	DEL	52	5	14	19	40	—	—	—	—	—
2012–13	Hannover Scorpions	DEL	32	7	14	21	65	—	—	—	—	—
2013–14	St. Charles Chill	CHL	66	15	19	34	90	—	—	—	—	—
AHL totals			192	29	69	98	138	3	1	2	3	2
DEL totals			395	62	135	197	515	40	9	10	19	67
