= Khilok (river) =

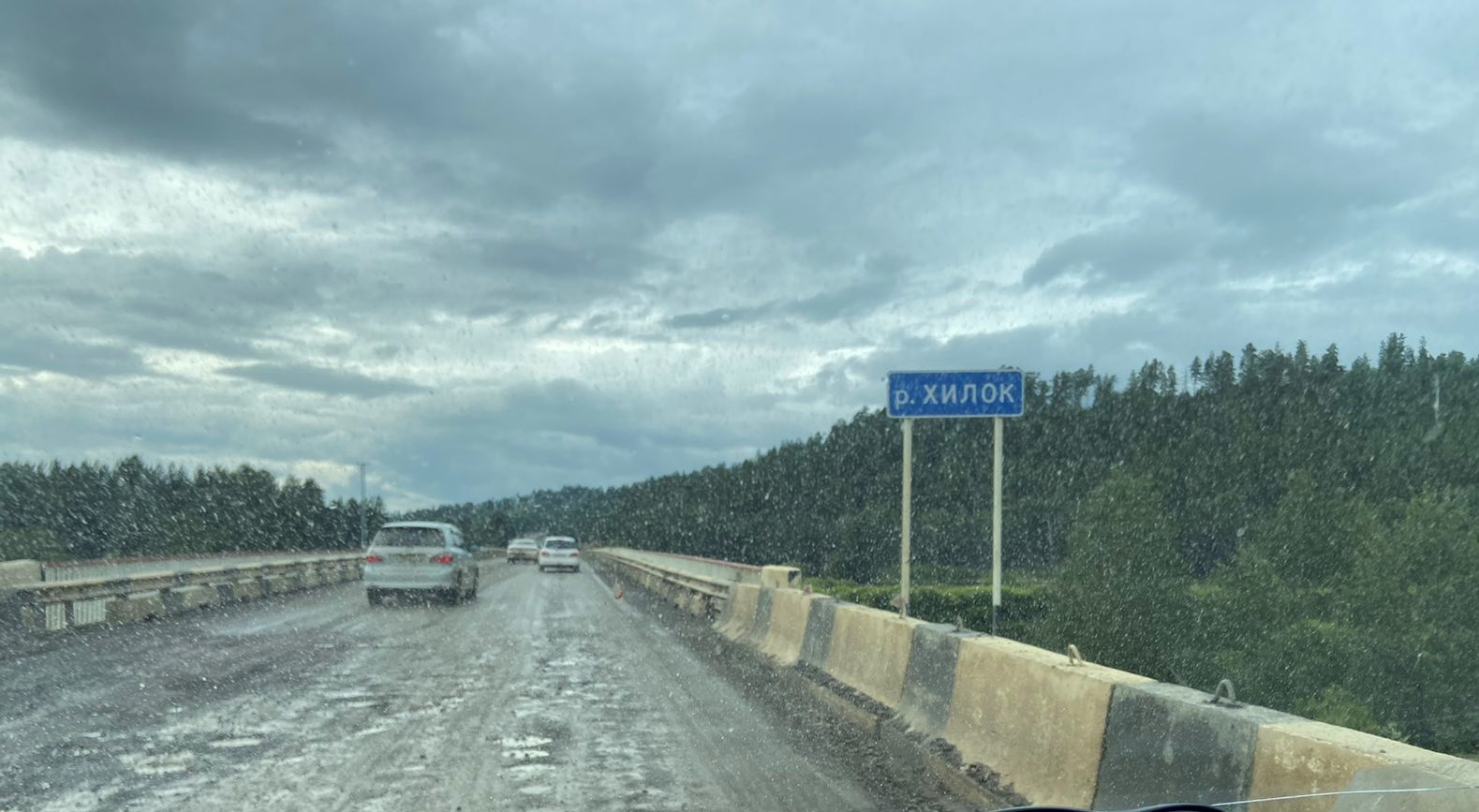
- Bridge over the Khilok river.

- Mouth location in Buryatia, Russia

Location
- Country: Russia

Physical characteristics
- Mouth: Selenga
  - coordinates: 51.3153°N 106.988°E
- Length: 840 km (520 mi)
- Basin size: 38,500 km^{2} (14,900 sq mi)

Basin features
- Progression: Selenga→ Lake Baikal→ Angara→ Yenisey→ Kara Sea

The Khilok (Russian: Хилок; Mongolian: Хилго/Khilgo, Buryat: Хёлго/Khyoolgo) is a river in Eastern Siberia, a right tributary of the Selenga. The length of the river is 840 km (520 mi) and its watershed is 38,500 square kilometres (14,900 mi^{2}). There are a few settlements on its banks: Khilok, Bada etc.

Arakhley Lake belongs to the Khilok river basin.

== See also ==
- List of rivers of Russia

== See also ==
- Selenga Highlands
- List of rivers of Russia
