= Khilok, Zabaykalsky Krai =

Town in Zabaykalsky Krai, Russia

Khilok Хилок
- Town
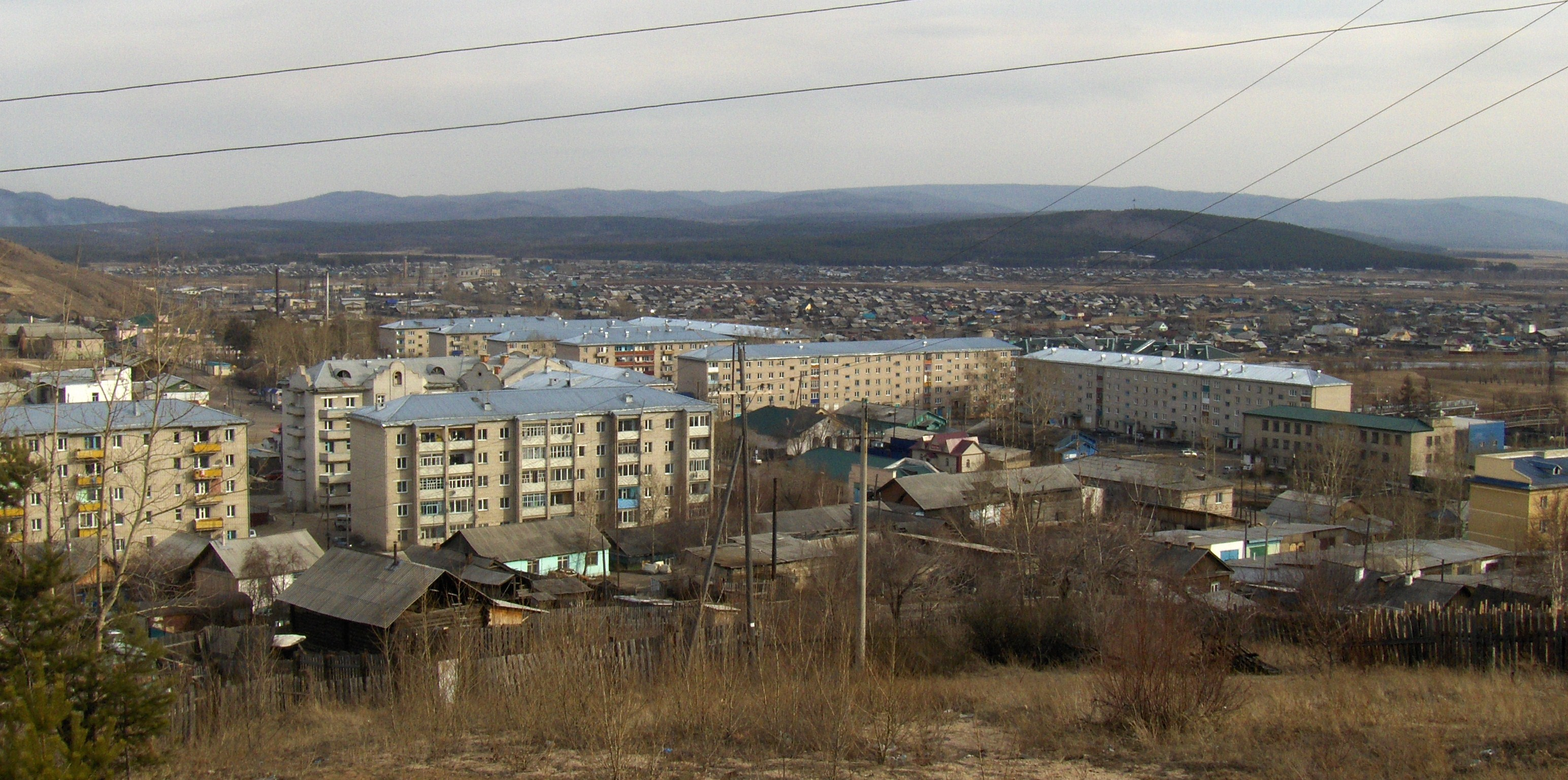
- View of Khilok

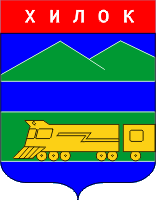
- Coat of arms
- Interactive map of Khilok
- Location of Khilok Khilok (Zabaykalsky Krai)
- Coordinates: 51°21′N 110°27′E
- Country: Russia
- Federal subject: Zabaykalsky Krai
- Administrative district: Khiloksky District
- Founded: 1895
- Town status since: 1951
- Elevation: 800 m (2,600 ft)

Population (2010 Census)
  - Total: 11,539
  - Estimate (January 2014): 11,124 (−3.6%)

Administrative status
  - Capital of: Khiloksky District

Municipal status
  - Municipal district: Khiloksky Municipal District
  - Urban settlement: Khilokskoye Urban Settlement
  - Capital of: Khiloksky Municipal District, Khilokskoye Urban Settlement
- Time zone: UTC+9 (MSK+6)
- Postal codes: 673200, 673201
- Dialing code: +7 30237
- OKTMO ID: 76647101001

Khilok (Russian: Хилок, IPA: [xʲɪˈlok]; Buryat: Хёолго, Khyoolgo; Mongolian: Хилго, Khilgo) is a town and the administrative center of Khiloksky District in Zabaykalsky Krai, Russia, located on the Khilok River, a right-hand tributary of the Selenga, 261 kilometers (162 mi) west of Chita, the administrative center of the krai. Population: 11,539 (2010 census); 11,152 (2002 census); 13,858 (1989 Soviet census).

== History ==
Cossack expeditions had explored the region since the middle of the 17th century; however, the large populations of Buryats and Evenks deterred the Cossacks from founding a permanent settlement. Peter the Great granted wide autonomy to the local princes, and the region was not colonized by Russians until the end of the 19th century when the construction of the Trans-Siberian Railway began.

The modern settlement of Khilok was founded in 1895 as a works base around the newly constructed railway station at the Khilok River, the river's name deriving from an Evenk word meaning whetstone. The local section of the Trans-Siberian Railway opened in 1900. Khilok was granted town status in 1951.

== Administrative and municipal status ==
Within the framework of administrative divisions, Khilok serves as the administrative center of Khiloksky District, to which it is directly subordinated. As a municipal division, the town of Khilok, together with two rural localities, is incorporated within Khiloksky Municipal District as Khilokskoye Urban Settlement.

== Climate ==
Climate data for Khilok (extremes 1936-present)
| Month | Jan | Feb | Mar | Apr | May | Jun | Jul | Aug | Sep | Oct | Nov | Dec | Year |
|---|---|---|---|---|---|---|---|---|---|---|---|---|---|
| Record high °C (°F) | −0.6 (30.9) | 6.4 (43.5) | 19.5 (67.1) | 27.4 (81.3) | 34.8 (94.6) | 38.2 (100.8) | 38.9 (102.0) | 37.5 (99.5) | 32.2 (90.0) | 26.1 (79.0) | 12.4 (54.3) | 5.5 (41.9) | 38.9 (102.0) |
| Mean daily maximum °C (°F) | −16.4 (2.5) | −8.9 (16.0) | −0.3 (31.5) | 9.1 (48.4) | 17.4 (63.3) | 24.0 (75.2) | 25.7 (78.3) | 22.7 (72.9) | 15.9 (60.6) | 6.0 (42.8) | −6.0 (21.2) | −14.9 (5.2) | 6.2 (43.2) |
| Daily mean °C (°F) | −24.3 (−11.7) | −18.9 (−2.0) | −9.4 (15.1) | 1.0 (33.8) | 8.4 (47.1) | 14.9 (58.8) | 17.7 (63.9) | 14.8 (58.6) | 7.3 (45.1) | −1.7 (28.9) | −12.9 (8.8) | −21.4 (−6.5) | −2.0 (28.3) |
| Mean daily minimum °C (°F) | −31.1 (−24.0) | −27.7 (−17.9) | −18.2 (−0.8) | −6.4 (20.5) | −0.3 (31.5) | 5.9 (42.6) | 10.2 (50.4) | 8.2 (46.8) | 0.6 (33.1) | −8.0 (17.6) | −19.1 (−2.4) | −27.5 (−17.5) | −9.4 (15.0) |
| Record low °C (°F) | −49.9 (−57.8) | −51.0 (−59.8) | −47.1 (−52.8) | −38.9 (−38.0) | −18.3 (−0.9) | −8.7 (16.3) | −2.9 (26.8) | −6.4 (20.5) | −19.3 (−2.7) | −32.6 (−26.7) | −41.4 (−42.5) | −48.8 (−55.8) | −51.0 (−59.8) |
| Average precipitation mm (inches) | 5.0 (0.20) | 4.0 (0.16) | 5.6 (0.22) | 13.7 (0.54) | 30.6 (1.20) | 58.8 (2.31) | 85.4 (3.36) | 93.0 (3.66) | 48.7 (1.92) | 13.4 (0.53) | 11.2 (0.44) | 9.1 (0.36) | 378.5 (14.9) |
Source: pogoda.ru.net

== Transportation ==
The town is a station on the Trans-Siberian Railway.
