= Khiloksky District =

Khiloksky District Хилокский район (Russian)
- District
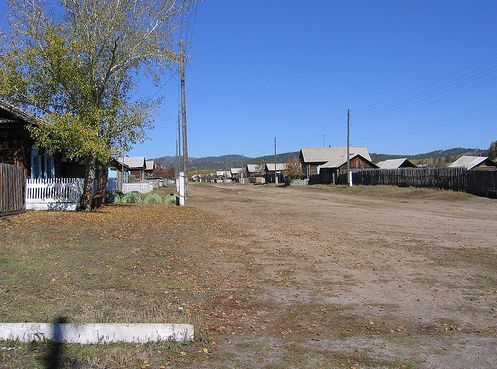
- Village Glinka, Khilovsky District

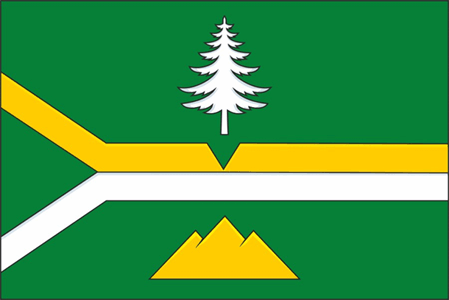
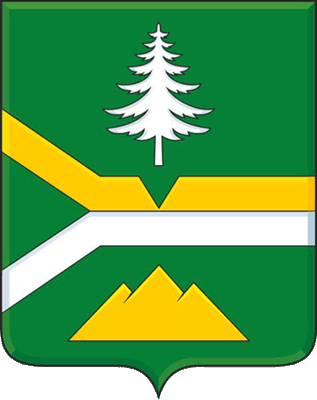
- Flag Coat of arms
- Location of Khiloksky District in Zabaykalsky Krai
- Coordinates: 51.420°N 111.043°E
- Country: Russia
- Federal subject: Zabaykalsky Krai
- Established: February 11, 1935
- Administrative center: Khilok

Area
  - Total: 14,800 km^{2} (5,700 sq mi)

Population (2010 Census)
  - Total: 31,760
  - Estimate (2018): 28,335 (−10.8%)
  - Density: 2.15/km^{2} (5.56/sq mi)
  - Urban: 48.5%
  - Rural: 51.5%

Administrative structure
  - Inhabited localities: 1 cities/towns, 1 urban-type settlements, 26 rural localities

Municipal structure
  - Municipally incorporated as: Khiloksky Municipal District
  - Municipal divisions: 2 urban settlements, 10 rural settlements
- Time zone: UTC+9 (MSK+6)
- OKTMO ID: 76647000
- Website: http://xn--h1aecm6a.xn--80aaaac8algcbgbck3fl0q.xn--p1ai/

Khiloksky District (Russian: Хилокский райо́н) is an administrative and municipal district (raion), one of the thirty-one in Zabaykalsky Krai, Russia. It is located in the southwest of the krai, and borders with Ulyotovsky District in the east, Krasnochikoysky District in the south, and with Petrovsk-Zabaykalsky District in the west. The area of the district is 14,800 square kilometers (5,700 sq mi). Its administrative center is the town of Khilok. Population: 31,760 (2010 census); 33,434 (2002 Census); 40,758 (1989 Soviet census). The population of Khilok accounts for 36.3% of the district's total population.

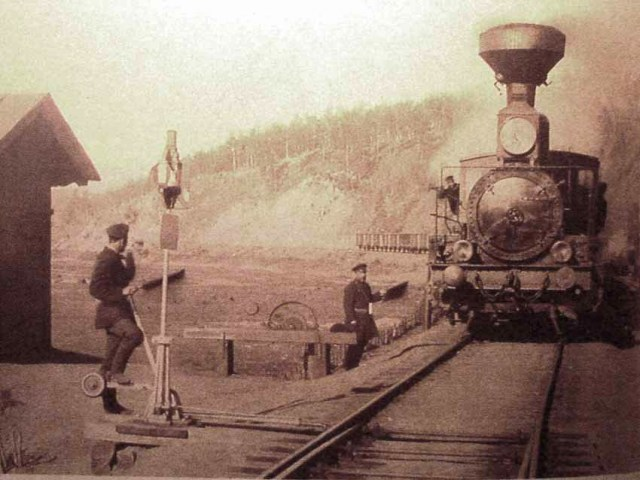
Khilok Station, on the Trans-Siberian Railroad, 1903

== History ==
The district was established on February 11, 1935.

== Gallery ==
Badinskaya steppe in Khiloksky district

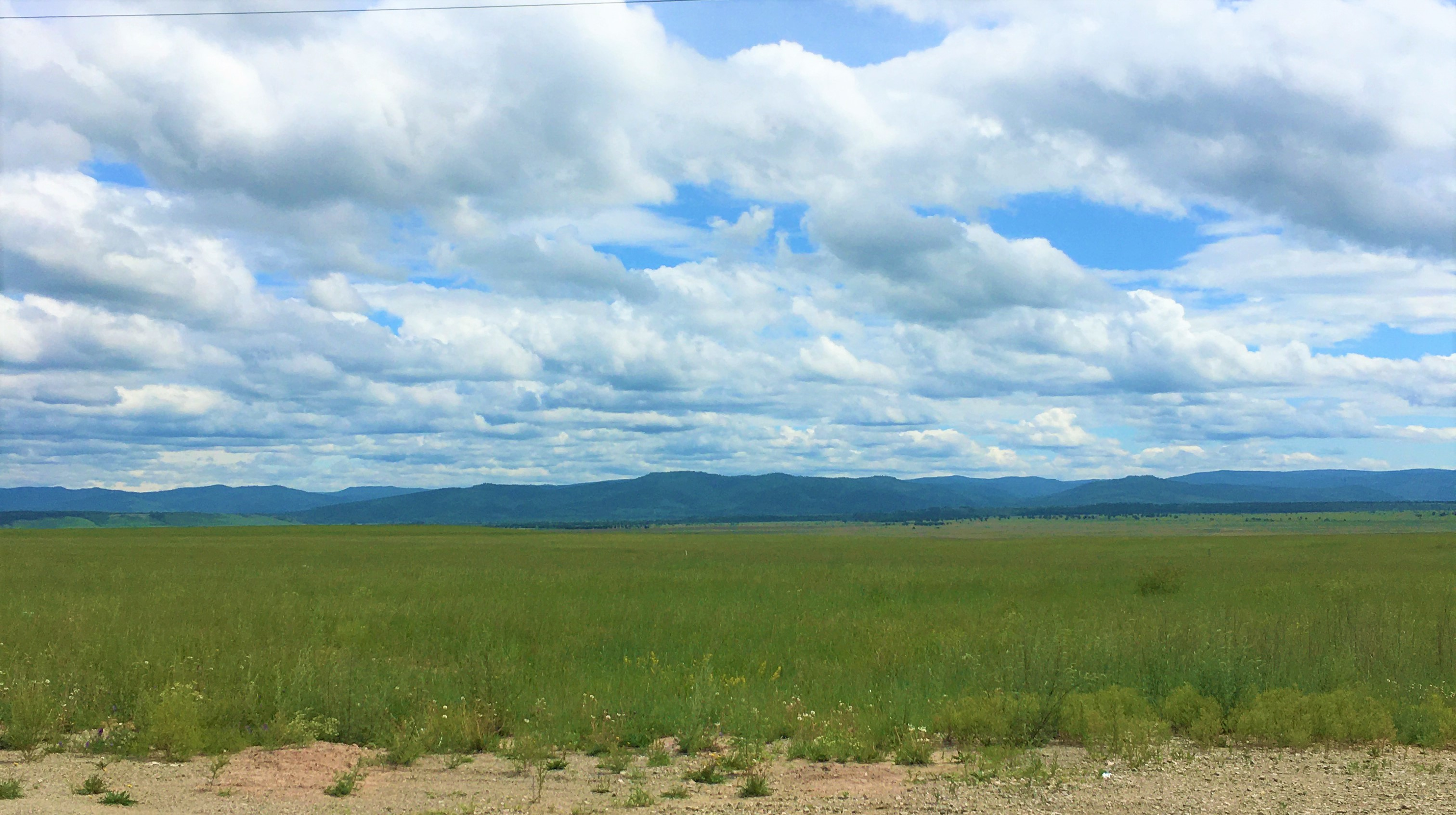

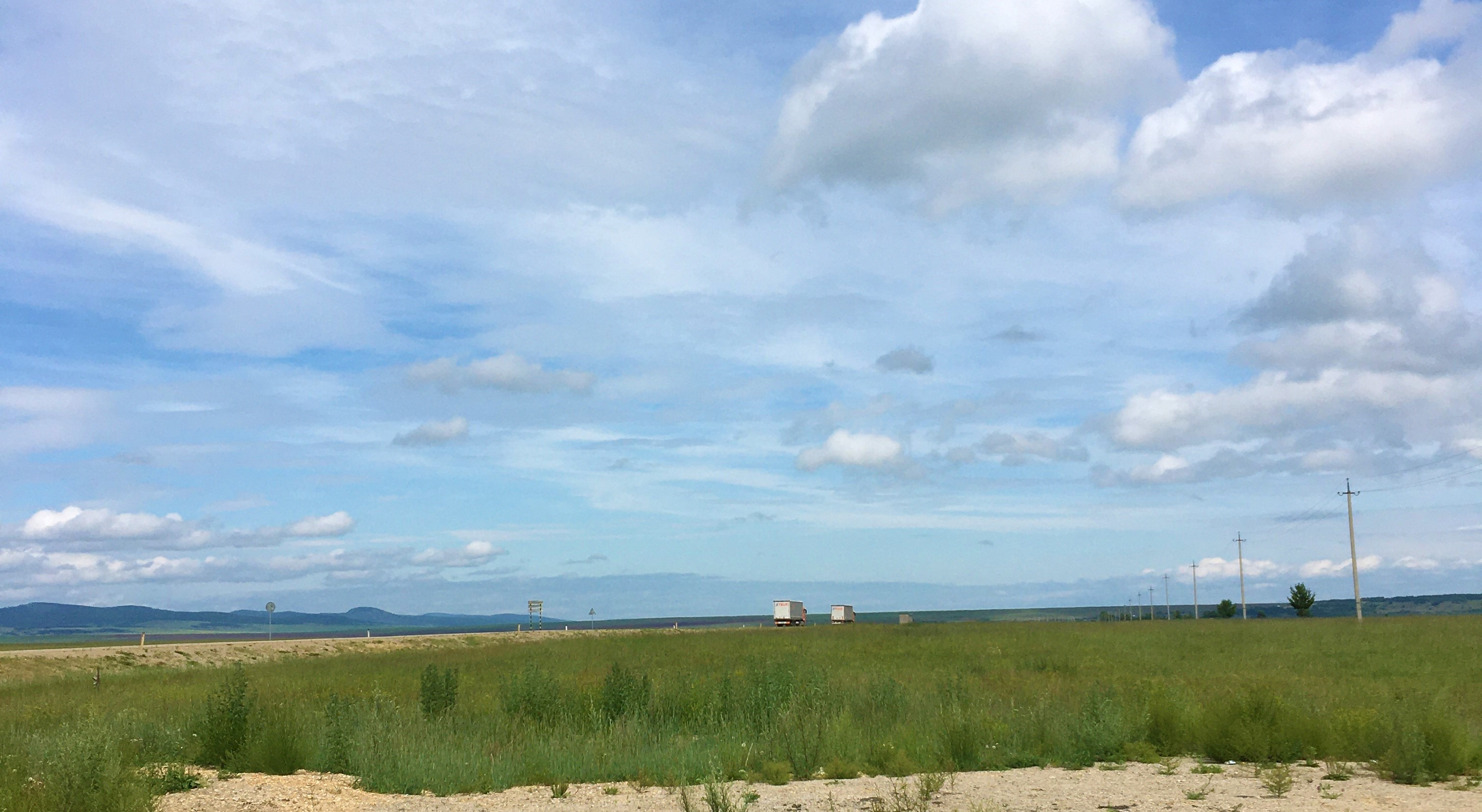

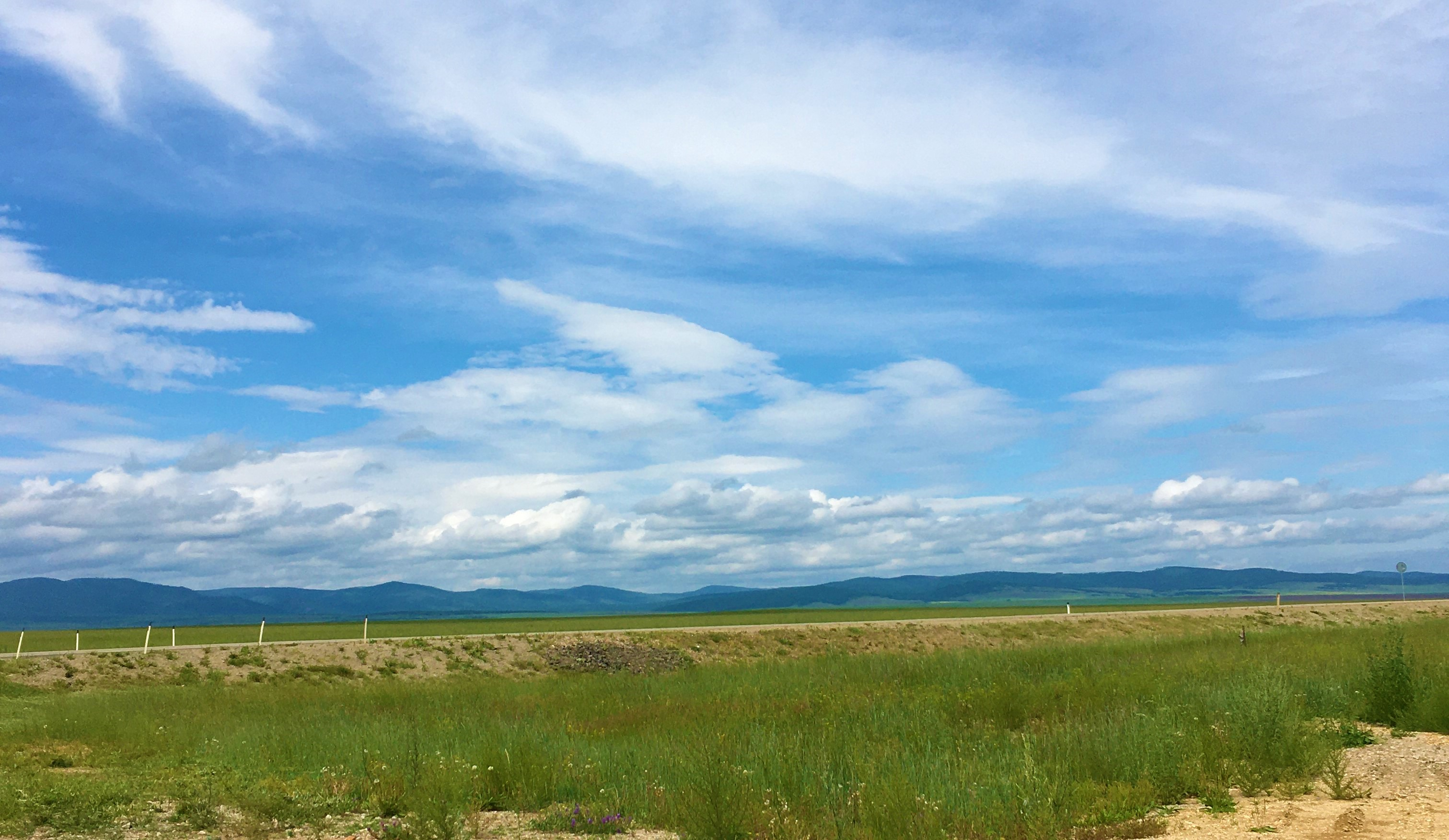

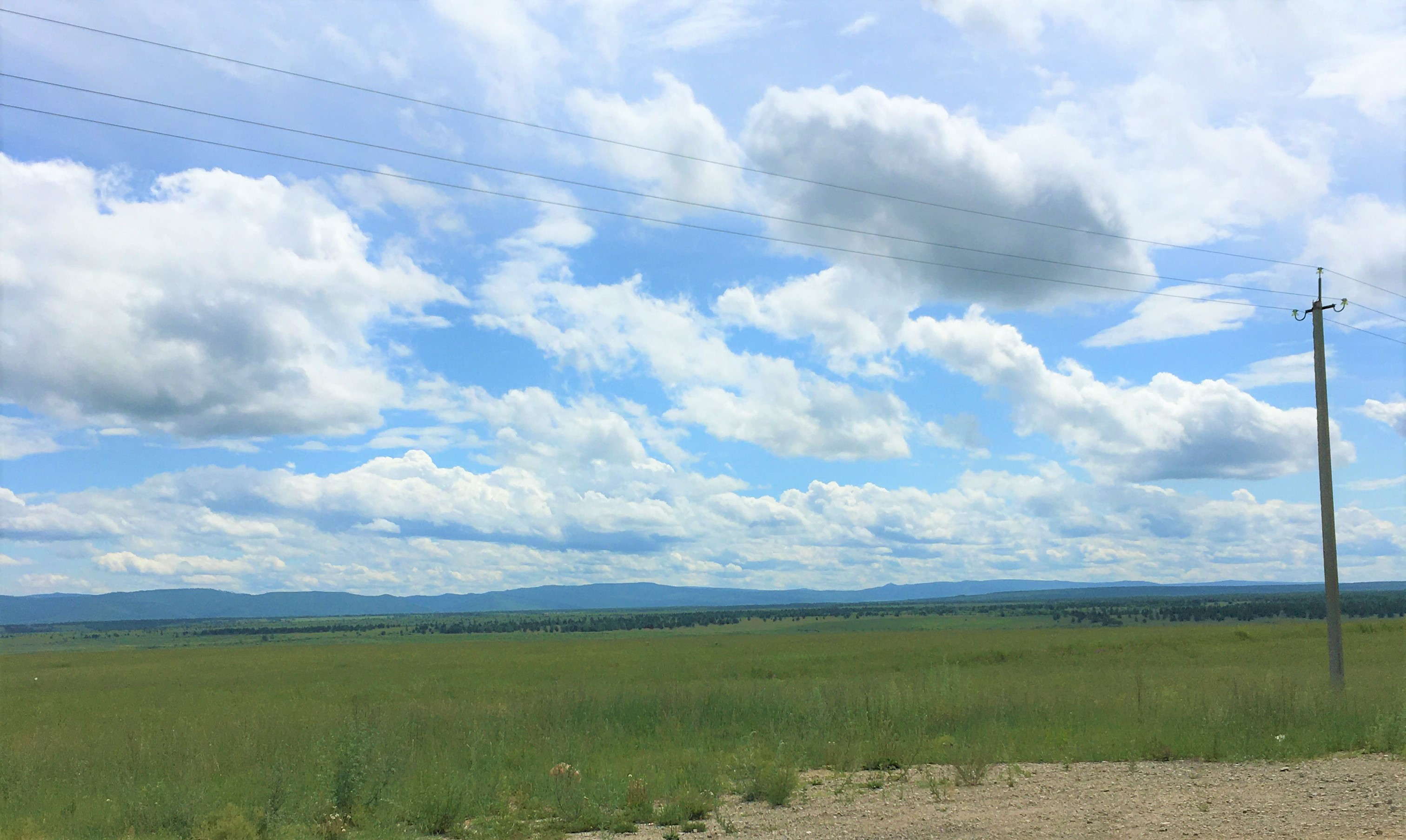

== See also ==
- Gyrshelun
