= 2003 MAAC men's ice hockey tournament =

2003 MAAC Men's ice hockey tournament
- Dates: March 15–23, 2003
- Teams: 8
- Finals site: Tate Rink; West Point, New York
- Champions: Mercyhurst (2nd title)
- Winning coach: Rick Gotkin (2nd title)
- MVP: David Wrigley (Mercyhurst)
- MAAC Men's Ice Hockey Tournaments

The 2003 MAAC Men's Ice Hockey Tournament was the 5th and final championship in the history of the conference. It was played between March 15 and March 23, 2003. Quarterfinal games were played at home team campus sites, while the final four games were played at the Tate Rink in West Point, New York, the home venue of the Army Black Knights. By winning the tournament Mercyhurst received MAAC's automatic bid to the 2003 NCAA Men's Division I Ice Hockey Tournament.

After the 2003 season, both the Fairfield Stags and Iona Gaels discontinued their hockey programs. The remaining 9 teams in the conference then formed Atlantic Hockey which began play in 2003-04.

== Format ==
The tournament featured three rounds of play with each round being single-elimination. The teams that finish below eighth in the standings are ineligible for tournament play. In the first round, the first and eighth seeds, the second and seventh seeds, the third seed and sixth seeds, and the fourth seed and fifth seeds played with the winner advancing to the semifinals. In the semifinals, the highest and lowest seeds and second highest and second lowest seeds play with the winner advancing to the championship game. The tournament champion receives an automatic bid to the 2003 NCAA Men's Division I Ice Hockey Tournament.

== Conference standings ==
Note: GP = Games played; W = Wins; L = Losses; T = Ties; PTS = Points; GF = Goals For; GA = Goals Against

2002–03 Metro Atlantic Athletic Conference standings
| | Conference | | | | | | | Overall | | | | | |
| | GP | W | L | T | PTS | GF | GA | GP | W | L | T | GF | GA |
|---|---|---|---|---|---|---|---|---|---|---|---|---|---|
| Mercyhurst†* | 26 | 19 | 5 | 2 | 40 | 105 | 73 | 37 | 22 | 13 | 2 | 135 | 129 |
| Quinnipiac | 26 | 18 | 7 | 1 | 37 | 109 | 72 | 36 | 22 | 13 | 1 | 139 | 98 |
| Holy Cross | 26 | 14 | 11 | 1 | 29 | 81 | 67 | 36 | 17 | 18 | 1 | 109 | 105 |
| Sacred Heart | 26 | 13 | 10 | 3 | 29 | 79 | 62 | 35 | 14 | 15 | 6 | 95 | 86 |
| Bentley | 26 | 13 | 13 | 0 | 26 | 77 | 80 | 34 | 15 | 19 | 0 | 94 | 122 |
| Army | 26 | 13 | 13 | 0 | 26 | 67 | 72 | 34 | 18 | 16 | 0 | 93 | 92 |
| Canisius | 26 | 11 | 13 | 2 | 24 | 66 | 71 | 37 | 12 | 21 | 4 | 85 | 126 |
| Iona | 26 | 11 | 14 | 1 | 23 | 80 | 80 | 35 | 11 | 22 | 2 | 91 | 122 |
| American International | 26 | 9 | 16 | 1 | 19 | 66 | 105 | 32 | 10 | 20 | 2 | 83 | 137 |
| Connecticut | 26 | 7 | 16 | 3 | 17 | 74 | 102 | 34 | 8 | 23 | 3 | 91 | 148 |
| Fairfield | 26 | 7 | 17 | 2 | 16 | 67 | 87 | 33 | 8 | 23 | 2 | 86 | 121 |
Championship: Mercyhurst † indicates conference regular season champion * indicates conference tournament champion Final rankings: USA Today/American Hockey Magazine Poll Top 15 Poll

== Bracket ==
Teams are reseeded after the quarterfinals

Quarterfinals; March 15
1 | Mercyhurst | 5
8 | Iona | 3
4 | Sacred Heart | 0
5 | Bentley | 2
2 | Quinnipiac | 3
7 | Canisius | 2
3 | Holy Cross | 3
6 | Army | 2

Semifinals; March 21
1 | Mercyhurst | 10
5 | Bentley | 2
2 | Quinnipiac | 3
3 | Holy Cross | 0

Championship; March 23
1 | Mercyhurst | 4
2 | Quinnipiac | 3

Note: * denotes overtime period(s)

=== Quarterfinals ===
==== (1) Mercyhurst vs. (8) Iona ====
| March 15 | Mercyhurst | 5 – 4 | Iona | Mercyhurst Ice Center | Recap |
| (Wrigley, Rivers) Dave Borrelli - 02:26 (Rivers, Muldoon) Dave Borrelli - 11:36 (Muldoon, Borrelli) David Wrigley - 15:04 | | First period | 08:54 - PP - Mark Hallam (Carroll, Swanson); 11:12 - PP - Tim Krueckl (Hallam, Carroll) |
| (Hansen, Tackaberry) T. J. Kemp - PP - 07:58 (Hansen, Wrigley) Peter Rynshoven - GW PP - 12:02 | | Second period | No scoring |
| No scoring | | Third period | 06:30 - Neil Clark (Kakepetum, Williams); 11:23 - Brent Williams (Clark, Bararuk) |
| Andy Franck ( 43 saves / 47 shots ) | | Goalie stats | Ian Vigier ( 26 saves / 31 shots ) |

==== (2) Quinnipiac vs. (7) Canisius ====
| March 15 | Quinnipiac | 3 – 2 | Canisius | Northford Ice Pavilion | Recap |
| No Scoring | | First period | 04:30 - Robert Carroll (Ovcjak, Dawe); 13:40 - Jeff Street (Martin, Bouffard) |
| (Ennis, Falite) John Kelly - 06:09 | | Second period | No scoring |
| (Bordieri, Kelly) Craig Falite - 05:52 (Morrison, White) Aaron Ludwig - GW - 12:58 | | Third period | No scoring |
| Justin Eddy ( 24 saves / 26 shots ) | | Goalie stats | Bryan Worosz ( 26 saves / 29 shots ) |

==== (3) Holy Cross vs. (6) Army ====
| March 15 | Holy Cross | 3 – 2 | Army | Hart Center | Recap |
| (Bianchi, Coskren) Andrew McKay - 15:23 | | First period | 15:55 - Mike McLean (Quinlan, MacLeod) |
| (Coskren, Doria) Jeff Dams - PP - 06:44 | | Second period | No scoring |
| (Doria, Kealey) Tyler McGregor - GW - 18:06 | | Third period | 15:58 - Nic Serre (Hines, Dudek) |
| Tony Quesada ( 21 saves / 23 shots ) | | Goalie stats | Brad Roberts ( 21 saves / 24 shots ) |

==== (4) Sacred Heart vs. (5) Bentley ====
| March 15 | Sacred Heart | 0 – 2 | Bentley | Milford Ice Pavilion |
| No Scoring | | First period | No scoring |
| No scoring | | Second period | 04:55 - GW PP - Joe Lovell (Markarian, Mayhew); 11:43 - Ryan Lessnau (Plattner, Peters) |
| No scoring | | Third period | No scoring |
| Eddy Ferhi ( 26 saves / 28 shots ) | | Goalie stats | Simon St. Pierre ( 34 saves / 37 shots ) |

=== Semifinals ===
==== (1) Mercyhurst vs. (5) Bentley ====
| March 21 | Mercyhurst | 10 – 2 | Bentley | Tate Rink | Recap |
| (Wrigley, Rivers) Dave Borrelli - 19:13 | | First period | No scoring |
| (Wrigley, Rivers) Dave Borrelli - 01:11 (Reynolds, Carter) Erik Johnson - GW - 01:56 (Rivers, Wrigley) Dave Borrelli - PP - 03:40 (Muldoon) Adam Tackaberry - 06:06; David Wrigley - 07:35 (Rivers) Marty Rychley - 13:27 | | Second period | No scoring |
| Marty Rychley - PP - 04:08 (Tackaberry, Kemp) P.J. Hiscock - 16:01 (Brown, Chambers) Peter Rynshoven - 16:01 | | Third period | 09:24 - Troy Wiebler (Calabro, Chase); 10:49 - PP - Ryan Lessnau (Chase, Goodwin) |
| Andy Franck ( 38 saves / 40 shots ) | | Goalie stats | Simon St. Pierre ( 16 saves / 22 shots ) / Geordan Murphy ( 14 saves / 18 shots ) |

==== (2) Quinnipiac vs. (3) Holy Cross ====
| March 21 | Quinnipiac | 3 – 0 | Holy Cross | Tate Rink | Recap |
| (Kelly) Michael Bordieri - GW - 03:39 (Craig, Testa) Matt Froehlich - 11:07 (Froehlich, Winkler) Matt Craig - 16:57 | | First period | No scoring |
| No scoring | | Second period | No scoring |
| No scoring | | Third period | No scoring |
| Jamie Holden ( 30 saves / 30 shots ) | | Goalie stats | Tony Quesada ( 7 saves / 10 shots ) / Ben Conway ( 11 saves / 11 shots ) |

=== Championship ===
==== (1) Mercyhurst vs. (2) Quinnipiac ====
| March 23 | Mercyhurst | 4 – 3 | Quinnipiac | Tate Rink | Recap |
| (Chambers) Rich Hansen - 08:19 | | First period | 06:18 - John Kelly (Ennis, Rossi); 13:26 - Chris White (Morrison, Ludwig) |
| (Muldoon) David Wrigley - 01:11 (Reynolds, King) Mike Carter - 13:56 | | Second period | No scoring |
| (Wrigley, Tackaberry) T. J. Kemp - GW PP - 08:45 | | Third period | 04:10 - Tim Morrison (Ludwig, White) |
| Andy Franck ( 27 saves / 30 shots ) | | Goalie stats | Jamie Holden ( 30 saves / 34 shots ) |

== Tournament awards ==
=== All-Tournament Team ===
- F Matt Craig (Quinnipiac)
- F David Wrigley* (Mercyhurst)
- F Dave Borrelli (Mercyhurst)
- D Mike Muldoon (Mercyhurst)
- D T. J. Kemp (Mercyhurst)
- G Andy Franck (Mercyhurst)

* Most Valuable Player(s)
