= 2002–03 NCAA Division I men's ice hockey season =

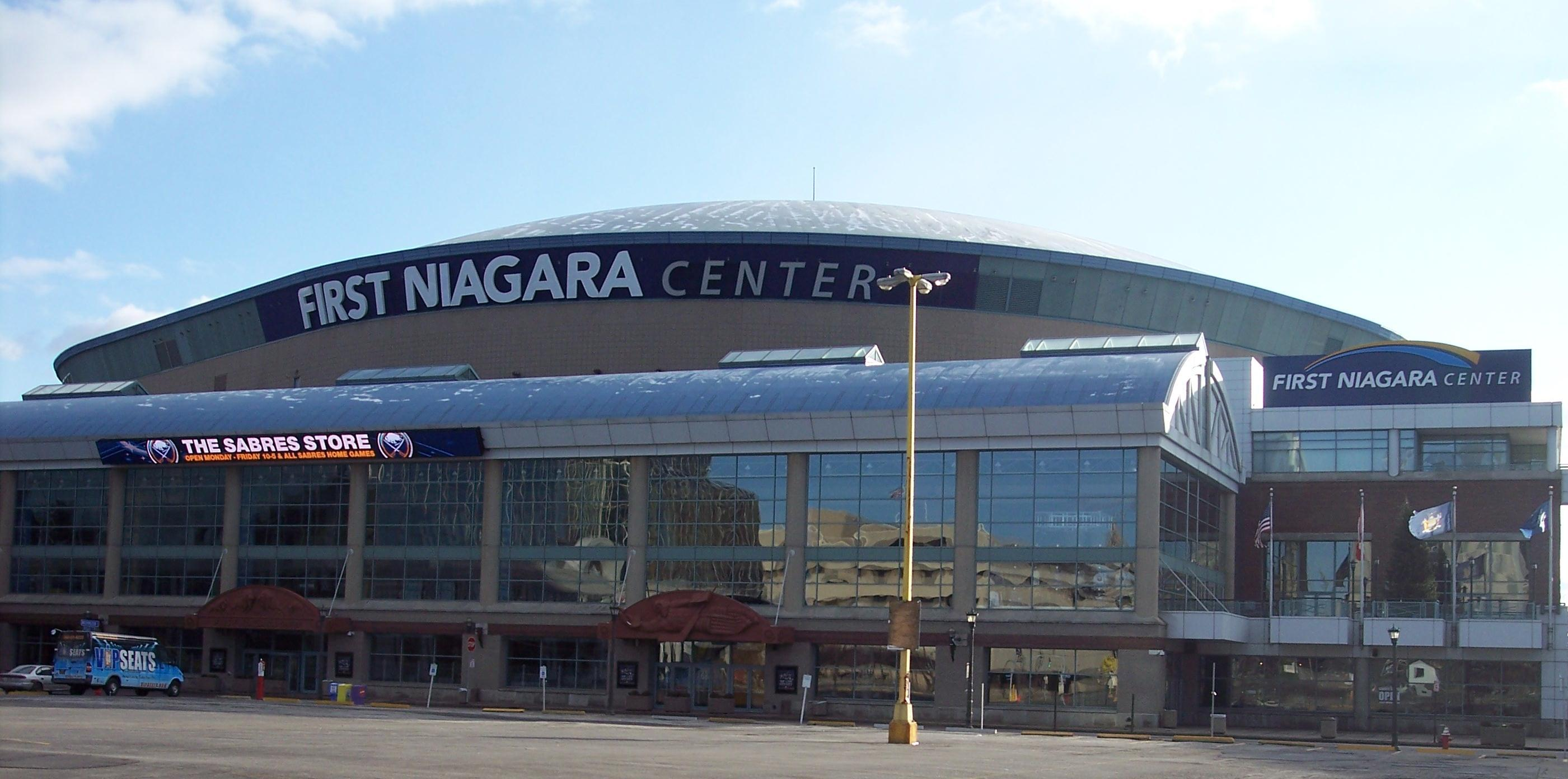
- First Niagara Center The HSBC Arena in Buffalo, New York hosted the 2003 Frozen Four
- Duration: October 4, 2002 – April 12, 2003
- NCAA tournament: 2003
- National championship: HSBC Arena; Buffalo, New York
- NCAA champion: Minnesota
- Hobey Baker Award: Peter Sejna (Colorado College)

The 2002–03 NCAA Division I men's ice hockey season began on October 4, 2002, and concluded with the 2003 NCAA Division I Men's Ice Hockey Tournament's championship game on April 12, 2003, at the HSBC Arena in Buffalo, New York. This was the 56th season in which an NCAA ice hockey championship was held and is the 109th year overall where an NCAA school fielded a team. The 2002–03 season was the final year for the MAAC hockey conference when Iona and Fairfield ended their programs at the conclusion of the season.

The NCAA Division I Men's Ice Hockey Tournament expanded to 16 teams for the first time in 2003. As a result, two regional sites were added for the new Northeast and Midwest brackets.

== Season Outlook ==
=== Pre-season polls ===
The top teams in the nation as ranked before the start of the season.

The U.S. College Hockey Online poll was voted on by coaches, media, and NHL scouts. The USA Today/American Hockey Magazine poll was voted on by coaches and media.

USCHO Poll
Rank	Team
1	Minnesota (22)
2	Denver (13)
3	Michigan (3)
4	New Hampshire (1)
5	Boston University (2)
6	Maine
7	Michigan State
8	Cornell
9	Boston College
10	Colorado College
11	St. Cloud State
12	Northern Michigan
13	North Dakota
14	Harvard
15	Ohio State

USA Today Poll
Rank	Team
1	Minnesota (12)
2	Michigan (1)
3	Denver (2)
4	New Hampshire
5	Boston University
6	Maine
7	Michigan State
8	Cornell
9	St. Cloud State
10	Colorado College
11	Northern Michigan
12 (tie)	Boston College
12 (tie)	North Dakota
14	Harvard
15	Ohio State

== Regular season ==
=== Season tournaments ===
Tournament	Dates	Teams	Champion
Lefty McFadden Invitational	October 4–5	4	Miami
Black Bear Classic	October 11–12	4	Maine
Ice Breaker Tournament	October 11–12	4	Boston University
Maverick Stampede	October 11–12	4	Denver
Xerox College Hockey Showcase	October 11–12	4	North Dakota
Nye Frontier Classic	October 18–19	4	Colorado College
College Hockey Showcase	November 29–December 1	4	
Denver Cup	December 27–28	4	Denver
Dodge Holiday Classic	December 27–28	4	Minnesota
Subway Holiday Classic	December 27–28	4	North Dakota
Florida College Classic	December 28–29	4	Maine
Great Lakes Invitational	December 28–29	4	Boston University
Ledyard Bank Classic	December 28–29	4	Dartmouth
Rensselaer Holiday Tournament	December 28–29	4	Merrimack
Badger Showdown	December 29–30	4	Wisconsin
Beanpot	February 3, 10	4	Boston University

=== Standings ===
2002–03 Central Collegiate Hockey Association standings
	Conference							Overall					
	GP	W	L	T	PTS	GF	GA	GP	W	L	T	GF	GA
#6 Ferris State†	28	22	5	1	45	121	64	42	31	10	1	188	100
#4 Michigan*	28	18	7	3	39	111	72	43	30	10	3	167	103
#12 Ohio State	28	16	8	4	36	90	63	43	25	13	5	129	95
#15 Michigan State	28	17	10	1	35	113	83	39	23	14	2	154	118
Northern Michigan	28	14	13	1	29	91	83	41	22	17	2	144	120
Miami	28	13	12	3	29	86	66	41	21	17	3	132	101
Notre Dame	28	13	12	3	29	90	90	40	17	17	6	122	123
Western Michigan	28	13	14	1	27	92	101	38	15	21	2	122	147
Alaska-Fairbanks	28	10	11	7	27	78	104	36	15	14	7	111	130
Nebraska-Omaha	28	9	17	2	20	64	97	40	13	22	5	98	135
Bowling Green	28	5	20	3	13	71	116	36	8	25	3	94	143
Lake Superior State	28	3	24	1	7	40	108	38	6	28	4	60	146
Championship: Michigan † indicates conference regular season champion * indicates conference tournament champion Final rankings: USA Today/American Hockey Magazine Poll Top 15 Poll

2002–03 College Hockey America standings
	Conference							Overall					
	GP	W	L	T	PTS	GF	GA	GP	W	L	T	GF	GA
Alabama-Huntsville†	20	13	5	2	28	88	59	35	18	14	3	135	121
Niagara	20	11	4	5	27	77	60	37	15	17	5	126	133
Wayne State*	20	11	7	2	24	62	56	40	21	17	2	131	131
Bemidji State	20	10	6	4	24	58	46	36	14	14	8	95	98
Findlay	20	3	13	4	10	41	77	35	10	21	4	93	120
Air Force	20	2	15	3	7	45	73	37	10	24	3	98	146
Championship: Wayne State † indicates conference regular season champion * indicates conference tournament champion Final rankings: USA Today/American Hockey Magazine Poll Top 15 Poll

2002–03 ECAC Hockey standings
	Conference							Overall					
	GP	W	L	T	PTS	GF	GA	GP	W	L	T	GF	GA
#1 Cornell†*	22	19	2	1	39	89	29	36	30	5	1	133	49
#10 Harvard	22	17	4	1	35	94	47	34	22	10	2	133	78
Dartmouth	22	13	9	0	26	77	71	34	20	13	1	127	110
Yale	22	13	9	0	26	94	73	32	18	14	0	121	107
Brown	22	10	8	4	24	65	54	35	16	14	5	96	83
Union	22	10	10	2	22	62	68	36	14	18	4	105	113
Clarkson	22	9	10	3	21	69	56	35	12	20	3	96	99
Colgate	22	9	10	3	21	49	71	40	17	19	4	96	127
St. Lawrence	22	7	12	3	17	65	80	37	11	21	5	103	129
Vermont	22	8	14	0	16	58	85	36	13	20	3	104	142
Rensselaer	22	4	15	3	11	49	84	40	12	25	3	94	134
Princeton	22	2	18	2	6	46	99	31	3	26	2	62	140
Championship: Cornell † indicates conference regular season champion (Cleary Cup) * indicates conference tournament champion (Whitelaw Cup); Final rankings: USA Today/American Hockey Magazine Poll Top 15 Poll

2002–03 Hockey East standings
	Conference							Overall					
	GP	W	L	T	PTS	GF	GA	GP	W	L	T	GF	GA
#3 New Hampshire†*	24	15	5	4	34	84	55	42	28	8	6	156	96
#8 Boston College†	24	16	6	2	34	97	55	39	24	11	4	149	97
#9 Maine	24	14	6	4	32	81	61	39	24	10	5	140	91
Providence	24	12	9	3	27	76	71	36	19	14	3	126	104
#7 Boston University	24	13	10	1	27	78	66	42	25	14	3	143	112
Massachusetts	24	10	14	0	20	60	80	37	19	17	1	119	125
Merrimack	24	7	13	4	18	59	80	36	12	18	6	92	116
Massachusetts–Lowell	24	4	16	4	12	63	95	36	11	20	5	110	142
Northeastern	24	5	17	2	12	54	89	34	10	21	3	83	115
Championship: New Hampshire † indicates conference regular season champion * indicates conference tournament champion Final rankings: USA Today/American Hockey Magazine Poll Top 15 Poll

2002–03 Metro Atlantic Athletic Conference standings
	Conference							Overall					
	GP	W	L	T	PTS	GF	GA	GP	W	L	T	GF	GA
Mercyhurst†*	26	19	5	2	40	105	73	37	22	13	2	135	129
Quinnipiac	26	18	7	1	37	109	72	36	22	13	1	139	98
Holy Cross	26	14	11	1	29	81	67	36	17	18	1	109	105
Sacred Heart	26	13	10	3	29	79	62	35	14	15	6	95	86
Bentley	26	13	13	0	26	77	80	34	15	19	0	94	122
Army	26	13	13	0	26	67	72	34	18	16	0	93	92
Canisius	26	11	13	2	24	66	71	37	12	21	4	85	126
Iona	26	11	14	1	23	80	80	35	11	22	2	91	122
American International	26	9	16	1	19	66	105	32	10	20	2	83	137
Connecticut	26	7	16	3	17	74	102	34	8	23	3	91	148
Fairfield	26	7	17	2	16	67	87	33	8	23	2	86	121
Championship: Mercyhurst † indicates conference regular season champion * indicates conference tournament champion Final rankings: USA Today/American Hockey Magazine Poll Top 15 Poll

2002–03 Western Collegiate Hockey Association standings
	Conference							Overall					
	GP	W	L	T	PTS	GF	GA	GP	W	L	T	GF	GA
#5 Colorado College†	28	19	4	5	43	125	70	42	30	7	5	190	103
#2 Minnesota*	28	15	6	7	37	106	81	45	28	8	9	189	122
#11 Minnesota State-Mankato	28	15	6	7	37	116	104	41	20	11	10	155	144
#13 North Dakota	28	14	9	5	33	103	82	43	26	12	5	172	120
#14 Minnesota-Duluth	28	14	10	4	32	95	80	42	22	15	5	153	119
St. Cloud State	28	12	11	5	29	96	85	38	17	16	5	124	118
Denver	28	11	11	6	28	95	85	41	21	14	6	152	102
Wisconsin	28	7	14	4	18	61	101	40	13	23	4	93	134
Michigan Tech	28	7	18	3	17	77	116	38	10	24	4	109	154
Alaska-Anchorage	28	0	22	6	6	41	111	36	1	28	7	57	143
Championship: Minnesota † indicates conference regular season champion * indicates conference tournament champion Final rankings: USA Today/American Hockey Magazine Poll Top 15 Poll

=== Final regular season polls ===
The top 15 teams ranked before the NCAA tournament.

USA Today Poll
Ranking	Team
1	Cornell
2	Colorado College
3	New Hampshire
4	Minnesota
5	Michigan
6	Ferris State
7	Boston University
8	Boston College
9	Maine
10	Minnesota State Mankato
11	Harvard
12	North Dakota
13	Ohio State
14	Minnesota Duluth
15	Michigan State

USCHO Poll
Ranking	Team
1	Cornell
2	Colorado College
3	New Hampshire
4	Minnesota
5	Ferris State
6	Boston University
7	Michigan
8	Boston College
9	Maine
10	Harvard
11	Minnesota State Mankato
12	North Dakota
13	Ohio State
14	Minnesota Duluth
15	St. Cloud State

== 2003 NCAA Tournament ==
First Round
1	Cornell	5
4	Minnesota State–Mankato	4
East Regional
2	Boston College	1
3	Ohio State	0
1	New Hampshire	5
4	St. Cloud State	2
Northeast Regional
2	Boston University	6
3	Harvard	4
1	Colorado College	4
4	Wayne State	2
Midwest Regional
2	Maine	1
3	Michigan	2
1	Minnesota	9
4	Mercyhurst	2
West Regional
2	Ferris State	5
3	North Dakota	2

Regional Finals
1	Cornell	2**
2	Boston College	1
1	New Hampshire	3
2	Boston University	0
1	Colorado College	1
3	Michigan	3
1	Minnesota	7
2	Ferris State	4

Frozen Four
E1	Cornell	2
NE1	New Hampshire	3
MW3	Michigan	2
W1	Minnesota	3*

National Championship
NE1	New Hampshire	1
W1	Minnesota	5

Note: * denotes overtime period(s)

== Player stats ==
=== Scoring leaders ===
The following players led the league in points at the conclusion of the season.

GP = Games played; G = Goals; A = Assists; Pts = Points; PIM = Penalty minutes

Player	Class	Team	GP	G	A	Pts	PIM
Peter Sejna	Junior	Colorado College	42	36	46	82	12
Chris Kunitz	Senior	Ferris State	42	35	44	79	47
Noah Clarke	Senior	Colorado College	42	21	49	70	15
Shane Joseph	Junior	Minnesota State-Mankato	41	29	36	65	6
Grant Stevenson	Sophomore	Minnesota State-Mankato	38	27	36	63	38
Brandon Bochenski	Sophomore	North Dakota	43	35	27	62	42
Tomas Vanek	Freshman	Minnesota	45	31	31	62	60
Zach Parise	Freshman	North Dakota	39	26	35	61	34
Jeff Legue	Sophomore	Ferris State	42	24	35	59	35
Ben Eaves	Junior	Boston College	36	18	39	57	18

=== Leading goaltenders ===
The following goaltenders led the league in goals against average at the end of the regular season while playing at least 33% of their team's total minutes.

GP = Games played; Min = Minutes played; W = Wins; L = Losses; OT = Overtime/shootout losses; GA = Goals against; SO = Shutouts; SV% = Save percentage; GAA = Goals against average

Player	Class	Team	GP	Min	W	L	OT	GA	SO	SV%	GAA
David LeNeveu	Sophomore	Cornell	32	1946	28	3	1	39	9	.940	1.20
Frank Doyle	Sophomore	Maine	21	1179	10	4	5	42	2	.915	2.14
Mike Ayers	Junior	New Hampshire	41	2499	27	8	6	91	7	.926	2.18
Matti Kaltianinen	Sophomore	Boston College	30	1843	18	9	3	68	1	.903	2.21
Mike Betz	Junior	Ohio State	36	2140	20	11	5	80	2	.903	2.24
Eddy Ferhi	Senior	Sacred Heart	29	1769	12	12	5	67	3	.924	2.27
Adam Berkhoel	Junior	Denver	26	1435	12	6	4	55	3	.908	2.30
Yann Danis	Junior	Brown	34	2074	15	14	5	80	5	.929	2.31
Al Montoya	Freshman	Michigan	43	2547	30	10	3	99	4	.911	2.33
Mike Brown	Sophomore	Ferris State	41	2403	30	10	1	94	4	.925	2.35

== Awards ==
=== NCAA ===
Award		Recipient
Hobey Baker Memorial Award		Peter Sejna, Colorado College
Spencer T. Penrose Award (Coach of the Year)		Bob Daniels, Ferris State
Most Outstanding Player in NCAA Tournament		Thomas Vanek, Minnesota
AHCA All-American Teams
East First Team	Position	West First Team
David LeNeveu, Cornell	G	Mike Brown, Ferris State
Freddy Meyer, Boston University	D	John-Michael Liles, Michigan State
Douglas Murray, Cornell	D	Tom Preissing, Colorado College
Ben Eaves, Boston College	F	Noah Clarke, Colorado College
Chris Higgins, Yale	F	Chris Kunitz, Ferris State
Dominic Moore, Harvard	F	Peter Sejna, Colorado College
East Second Team	Position	West Second Team
Mike Ayers, New Hampshire	G	Curtis McElhinney, Colorado College
J. D. Forrest, Boston College	D	Brad Fast, Michigan State
Noah Welch, Harvard	D	Paul Martin, Minnesota
Stephen Baby, Cornell	F	Shane Joseph, Minnesota State-Mankato
Lanny Gare, New Hampshire	F	Grant Stevenson, Minnesota State-Mankato
Colin Hemingway, New Hampshire	F	R. J. Umberger, Ohio State

=== CCHA ===
Awards		Recipient
Player of the Year		Chris Kunitz, Ferris State
Best Defensive Forward		Jed Ortmeyer, Michigan
Best Defensive Defenseman		Brad Fast, Michigan State
Best Offensive Defenseman		John-Michael Liles, Michigan State
Rookie of the Year		Jeff Tambellini, Michigan
Goaltender of the Year		Mike Betz, Ohio State
Coach of the Year		Bob Daniels, Ferris State
Terry Flanagan Memorial Award		Brian Maloney, Michigan State
Ilitch Humanitarian Award		Mike Betz, Ohio State
Perani Cup Champion		Mike Brown, Ferris State
Most Valuable Player in Tournament		Jed Ortmeyer, Michigan
All-CCHA Teams
First Team	Position	Second Team
Mike Brown, Ferris State	G	Mike Betz, Ohio State
Brad Fast, Michigan State	D	Simon Mangos, Ferris State
John-Michael Liles, Michigan State	D	Troy Milam, Ferris State
Chris Kunitz, Ferris State	F	Mike Kompon, Miami
Jim Slater, Michigan State	F	Jeff Legue, Ferris State
R. J. Umberger, Ohio State	F	Jeff Tambellini, Michigan
Rookie Team	Position	
Al Montoya, Michigan	G	
Andy Greene, Michigan	D	
Danny Richmond, Michigan	D	
Vince Bellissimo, Western Michigan	F	
David Booth, Michigan State	F	
Jeff Tambellini, Michigan	F	

=== CHA ===
Award		Recipient
Player of the Year		Joe Tallari, Niagara
Rookie of the Year		Scott Munroe, Alabama-Huntsville
Coach of the Year		Doug Ross, Alabama-Huntsville
Student-Athlete of the Year		Jason Maxwell, Findlay
Most Valuable Player in Tournament		Marc St. Jean, Wayne State
All-CHA Teams
First Team	Position	Second Team
Grady Hunt, Bemidji State	G	Scott Munroe, Alabama-Huntsville
Ryan Leasa, Alabama-Huntsville	D	Tyler Butler, Alabama-Huntsville
Bryce Methven, Bemidji State	D	Keith Stanich, Wayne State
Joe Tallari, Niagara	F	Steve Cherlebois, Alabama-Huntsville
Marty Goulet, Bemidji State	F	Andy Berg, Air Force
Jared Ross, Alabama-Huntsville	F	Barret Ehgoetz, Niagara
Rookie Team	Position	
Scott Munroe, Alabama-Huntsville	G	
Jeremy Schreiber, Alabama-Huntsville	D	
Brian Hartman, Niagara	D	
Derek MacKay, Wayne State	F	
Andrew Radzak, Findlay	F	
Jason Williamson, Niagara	F	

=== ECAC ===
Award		Recipient
Player of the Year		Chris Higgins, Yale
		David LeNeveu, Cornell
Rookie of the Year		Hugh Jessiman, Dartmouth
Coach of the Year		Mike Schafer, Cornell
Best Defensive Forward		Stephen Bâby, Cornell
Best Defensive Defenseman		Douglas Murray, Cornell
Ken Dryden Award		David LeNeveu, Cornell
Most Outstanding Player in Tournament		David LeNeveu, Cornell
All-ECAC Hockey Teams
First Team	Position	Second Team
David LeNeveu, Cornell	G	Yann Danis, Brown
Douglas Murray, Cornell	D	Noah Welch, Harvard
Randy Jones, Clarkson	D	Trevor Byrne, Dartmouth
Dominic Moore, Harvard	F	Scooter Smith, Colgate
Tim Pettit, Harvard	F	Stephen Baby, Cornell
Chris Higgins, Yale	F	Ryan Vesce, Cornell
Rookie Team	Position	
Kris Mayotte, Union	G	
Sean Offers, Dartmouth	D	
Jaime Sifers, Vermont	D	
Kevin Croxton, Rensselaer	F	
Hugh Jessiman, Dartmouth	F	
John Zeiler, St. Lawrence	F	

=== Hockey East ===
Award		Recipient
Player of the Year		Mike Ayers, New Hampshire
Player of the Year		Ben Eaves, Boston College
Rookie of the Year		Jimmy Howard, Maine
Bob Kullen Coach of the Year Award		Don Cahoon, Massachusetts
Len Ceglarski Sportsmanship Award		Martin Kariya, Maine
Best Defensive Forward		Mark Mullen, Boston University
Best Defensive Defenseman		Cliff Loya, Maine
Three-Stars Award		Ben Eaves, Boston College
Three-Stars Award		Joe Exter, Merrimack
William Flynn Tournament Most Valuable Player		Sean Fields, Boston University
All-Hockey East Teams
First Team	Position	Second Team
Mike Ayers, New Hampshire	G	Joe Exter, Merrimack
Freddy Meyer, Boston University	D	J.D. Forest, Boston College
Francis Nault, Maine	D	Thomas Pöck, Massachusetts
	D	Stephen Wood, Providence
Ben Eaves, Boston College	F	Colin Hemingway, New Hampshire
Lanny Gare, New Hampshire	F	Lucas Lawson, Maine
Martin Kariya, Maine	F	Ed McGrane, Massachusetts-Lowell
Rookie Team	Position	
Jimmy Howard, Maine	G	
Jekabs Redlihs, Boston University	D	
Bryan Schmidt, Merrimack	D	
Chris Collins, Boston College	F	
Mike Morris, Northeastern	F	
David Van der Gulik, Boston University	F	
Stephen Werner, Massachusetts	F	

=== MAAC ===
Award		Recipient
Offensive Player of the Year		Brandon Doria, Holy Cross
Defensive Player of the Year		Wade Winkler, Quinnipiac
Goaltender of the Year		Brad Roberts, Army
		Eddy Ferhi, Sacred Heart
Offensive Rookie of the Year		Tyler McGregor, Holy Cross
		Scott Reynolds, Mercyhurst
Defensive Rookie of the Year		Brad Roberts, Army
Coach of the Year		Ryan Soderquist, Bentley
Tournament Most Valuable Player		David Wrigley, Mercyhurst
All-MAAC Teams
First Team	Position	Second Team
Brad Roberts, Army	G	Simon St. Pierre, Bentley
Eddy Ferhi, Sacred Heart	G	
Wade Winkler, Quinnipiac	D	T. J. Kemp, Mercyhurst
Les Hrapchak, Sacred Heart	D	Joe Dudek, Army
Brandon Doria, Holy Cross	F	Brian Herbert, Quinnipiac
Martin Paquet, Sacred Heart	F	Rich Hansen, Mercyhurst
Matt Craig, Quinnipiac	F	Rae Metz, Fairfield
Rookie Team	Position	
Brad Roberts, Army	G	
Conrad Martin, Mercyhurst	D	
Tim Songin, Canisius	D	
Ryan Swanson, Iona	D	
Tyler McGregor, Holy Cross	F	
Paul Markarian, Bentley	F	
Ryan Mayhew, Bentley	F	
Scott Reynolds, Mercyhurst	F	

=== WCHA ===
Award		Recipient
Player of the Year		Peter Sejna, Colorado College
Defensive Player of the Year		Joe Cullen, Colorado College
		Aaron MacKenzie, Denver
Rookie of the Year		Thomas Vanek, Minnesota
Student-Athlete of the Year		Tom Preissing, Colorado College
Coach of the Year		Troy Jutting, Minnesota State-Mankato
Most Valuable Player in Tournament		Grant Potulny, Minnesota
All-WCHA Teams
First Team	Position	Second Team
Curtis McElhinney, Colorado College	G	Wade Dubielewicz, Denver
Tom Preissing, Colorado College	D	Aaron MacKenzie, Denver
Paul Martin, Minnesota	D	Keith Ballard, Minnesota
Peter Sejna, Colorado College	F	Noah Clarke, Colorado College
Shane Joseph, Minnesota State-Mankato	F	Thomas Vanek, Minnesota
Grant Stevenson, Minnesota State-Mankato	F	Brandon Bochenski, North Dakota
Third Team	Position	Rookie Team
Iassc Reichmuth, Minnesota-Duluth	G	Iassc Reichmuth, Minnesota-Duluth
Andy Schneider, North Dakota	D	Mark Stuart, Colorado College
David Hale, North Dakota	D	Chris Harrington, Minnesota
Zach Parise, North Dakota	F	Thomas Vanek, Minnesota
Kevin Doell, Denver	F	Zach Parise, North Dakota
Troy Riddle, Minnesota	F	Brett Sterling, Colorado College

== 2003 NHL entry draft ==
Round	Pick	Player	College	Conference	NHL team
1	5	Thomas Vanek	Minnesota	WCHA	Buffalo Sabres
1	7	Ryan Suter ^{†}	Wisconsin	WCHA	Nashville Predators
1	12	Hugh Jessiman	Dartmouth	ECAC Hockey	New York Rangers
1	17	Zach Parise	North Dakota	WCHA	New Jersey Devils
1	21	Mark Stuart	Colorado College	WCHA	Boston Bruins
1	23	Ryan Kesler	Ohio State	CCHA	Vancouver Canucks
1	26	Brian Boyle ^{†}	Boston College	Hockey East	Los Angeles Kings
1	27	Jeff Tambellini	Michigan	CCHA	Los Angeles Kings
1	29	Patrick Eaves	Boston College	Hockey East	Ottawa Senators
2	31	Danny Richmond	Michigan	CCHA	Carolina Hurricanes
2	41	Matt Smaby ^{†}	North Dakota	WCHA	Tampa Bay Lightning
2	47	Matt Carle ^{†}	Denver	WCHA	San Jose Sharks
2	51	Colin McDonald ^{†}	Providence	Hockey East	Edmonton Oilers
2	57	John Doherty	New Hampshire	Hockey East	Toronto Maple Leafs
2	62	David Backes ^{†}	Minnesota State–Mankato	WCHA	St. Louis Blues
2	64	Jimmy Howard	Maine	Hockey East	Detroit Red Wings
3	75	Kenny Roche ^{†}	Boston University	Hockey East	New York Rangers
3	78	Danny Irmen ^{†}	Minnesota	WCHA	Minnesota Wild
3	79	Ryan O'Byrne ^{†}	Cornell	ECAC Hockey	Montreal Canadiens
3	83	Stephen Werner	Massachusetts	Hockey East	Washington Capitals
3	86	Shane Hynes	Cornell	ECAC Hockey	Mighty Ducks of Anaheim
3	87	Ryan Potulny ^{†}	Minnesota	WCHA	Philadelphia Flyers
3	90	Juha Alén	Northern Michigan	WCHA	Mighty Ducks of Anaheim
3	99	Matt Nickerson ^{†}	Clarkson	ECAC Hockey	Dallas Stars
4	103	Kevin Jarman	Massachusetts	Hockey East	Columbus Blue Jackets
4	107	Byron Bitz ^{†}	Cornell	ECAC Hockey	Boston Bruins
4	122	Corey Potter	Michigan State	CCHA	New York Rangers
4	124	Jay Pemberton	Providence	Hockey East	Pittsburgh Penguins
4	136	Mike Vannelli ^{†}	Minnesota	WCHA	Atlanta Thrashers
5	137	Tyson Strachan ^{†}	Ohio State	CCHA	Carolina Hurricanes
5	141	Dan Travis	New Hampshire	Hockey East	Florida Panthers
5	142	Tim Cook ^{†}	Michigan	CCHA	Ottawa Senators
5	143	Greg Moore	Maine	Hockey East	Calgary Flames
5	145	Brett Sterling	Colorado College	WCHA	Atlanta Thrashers
5	146	Mark McCutcheon ^{†}	Cornell	ECAC Hockey	Colorado Avalanche
5	148	Lee Stempniak	Dartmouth	ECAC Hockey	St. Louis Blues
5	150	Tom Morrow ^{†}	Boston University	Hockey East	Buffalo Sabres
5	152	Brady Murray ^{†}	North Dakota	WCHA	Los Angeles Kings
5	154	David Rohlfs ^{†}	Michigan	CCHA	Edmonton Oilers
5	155	Josh Robertson ^{†}	Northeastern	Hockey East	Washington Capitals
5	165	Gino Guyer	Minnesota	WCHA	Dallas Stars
5	167	Zach Tarkir ^{†}	Northern Michigan	WCHA	New Jersey Devils
6	175	Mike Hamilton ^{†}	Maine	Hockey East	Atlanta Thrashers
6	180	Chris Holt ^{†}	Nebraska–Omaha	CCHA	New York Rangers
6	186	Drew Miller ^{†}	Michigan State	CCHA	Mighty Ducks of Anaheim
6	189	Jonathan Lehun	St. Cloud State	WCHA	St. Louis Blues
6	190	Chad Brownlee ^{†}	Minnesota State–Mankato	WCHA	Vancouver Canucks
6	195	Drew Bagnall ^{†}	St. Lawrence	ECAC Hockey	Dallas Stars
7	205	Joe Pavelski ^{†}	Wisconsin	WCHA	San Jose Sharks
7	209	Dylan Reese ^{†}	Harvard	ECAC Hockey	New York Rangers
7	218	Dirk Southern	Northern Michigan	WCHA	Mighty Ducks of Anaheim
7	225	Brett Hemingway	New Hampshire	Hockey East	Colorado Avalanche
7	227	Jay Rosehill ^{†}	Minnesota–Duluth	WCHA	Tampa Bay Lightning
8	231	Matt Zaba ^{†}	Colorado College	WCHA	Los Angeles Kings
8	232	Joe Jensen	St. Cloud State	WCHA	Pittsburgh Penguins
8	238	Cody Blanshan	Nebraska–Omaha	CCHA	New York Islanders
8	244	Mike Sullivan ^{†}	Clarkson	ECAC Hockey	Los Angeles Kings
8	249	Andrew Joudrey ^{†}	Wisconsin	WCHA	Washington Capitals
8	256	Brady Greco	Colorado College	WCHA	Tampa Bay Lightning
9	263	Matt Moulson	Cornell	ECAC Hockey	Pittsburgh Penguins
9	265	Tanner Glass ^{†}	Dartmouth	ECAC Hockey	Florida Panthers
9	267	Brian O’Hanley ^{†}	Boston College	Hockey East	San Jose Sharks
9	269	Rylan Kaip ^{†}	North Dakota	WCHA	Atlanta Thrashers
9	272	Sean Sullivan ^{†}	Boston University	Hockey East	Phoenix Coyotes
9	274	Marty Guerin ^{†}	Miami	CCHA	Los Angeles Kings
9	275	Michael Grenzy ^{†}	Clarkson	ECAC Hockey	Chicago Blackhawks
9	276	Carter Lee ^{†}	Northeastern	Hockey East	San Jose Sharks
9	277	Kevin Regan	New Hampshire	Hockey East	Boston Bruins
9	281	Steve McClellan ^{†}	Northeastern	Hockey East	Colorado Avalanche
9	282	Chris Porter ^{†}	North Dakota	WCHA	Chicago Blackhawks
9	288	David Jones ^{†}	Dartmouth	ECAC Hockey	Colorado Avalanche
9	291	Brian Elliott ^{†}	Wisconsin	WCHA	Ottawa Senators

† incoming freshman

== See also ==
- 2002–03 NCAA Division III men's ice hockey season
