= MAAC Men's Ice Hockey Coach of the Year =

MAAC Coach of the Year
- Sport: Ice hockey
- Awarded for: The Coach of the Year in the Metro Atlantic Athletic Conference

History
- First award: 1999
- Final award: 2003
- Most recent: Ryan Soderquist

The MAAC Coach of the Year was an annual award given out at the conclusion of the Metro Atlantic Athletic Conference regular season to the coach of a men's ice hockey team in the conference as voted by the coaches of each MAAC team.

The award was discontinued after 2002-03 when the MAAC ice hockey conference was dissolved and all remaining programs reformed in Atlantic Hockey.

== Award winners ==
Year	Winner	School
1998–99	Gary Wright	American International
1999–00	Shaun Hannah	Sacred Heart
2000-01	Rick Gotkin	Mercyhurst
2001-02	Paul Pearl	Holy Cross
2002-03	Ryan Soderquist	Bentley

=== Winners by school ===
School	Winners
American International	1
Bentley	1
Holy Cross	1
Mercyhurst	1
Sacred Heart	1

== See also ==
- Atlantic Hockey Coach of the Year
- MAAC Awards
