= List of Metro Atlantic Athletic Conference men's ice hockey awards =

The Metro Atlantic Athletic Conference (MAAC) gave out several conference awards to ice hockey players and coaches while it operated a hockey conference from 1998-99 thru 2002-03. For five seasons the MAAC named players to three all-conference teams (First Team, Second Team and Rookie Team) and bestowed six of seven individual awards at the conclusion of the regular season. The seventh award (Tournament MVP) was conferred after the conference tournament was completed. All Awards were voted for by the head coaches of each MAAC member team.

All Awards were discontinued after the conclusion of the 2002-03 season when the MAAC ice hockey conference was dissolved due to Fairfield and Iona discontinuing their Division I programs. All remaining schools formed Atlantic Hockey which began play the following year.

== All-Conference Teams ==
The all-conference teams are composed of one goaltender, two defencemen and three forwards. Should a tie occur for the final selection at any position, both players will be included as part of the superior team with no reduction in the number of players appearing on any succeeding teams (as happened in 1998–99 and 1999–00). Players may only appear once per year on any of the first or second teams but freshman may appear on both the rookie team and one of the other all-conference teams.

=== First Team ===
1998–99
Player	Pos	Team
Scott Simpson	G	Holy Cross
J. C. Wells	G	Quinnipiac
Dan Ennis	D	Quinnipiac
Derek Gilham	D	Canisius
Kris Cumming	D	Quinnipiac
Ryan Carter	F	Iona
Geoff Angell	F	Connecticut
Chris Fattey	F	Holy Cross
Chad Poliquin	F	Quinnipiac

1999–00
Player	Pos	Team
Sean Weaver	G	Canisius
Paul Colotino	D	Mercyhurst
Steve Tobio	D	Bentley
Anthony DiPalma	D	Quinnipiac
Shawn Mansoff	F	Quinnipiac
Ryan Carter	F	Iona
Ryan Soderquist	F	Bentley
Chris Cerrella	F	Quinnipiac

2000-01
Player	Pos	Team
Peter Aubry	G	Mercyhurst
Nathan Lutz	D	Iona
Aaron Arnett	D	American International
Ryan Manitowich	F	Iona
Chris Cerrella	F	Quinnipiac
Eric Ellis	F	Mercyhurst

2001-02
Player	Pos	Team
Peter Aubry	G	Mercyhurst
Steve Tobio	D	Bentley
Mike Boylan	D	Connecticut
Patrick Rissmiller	F	Holy Cross
Louis Goulet	F	Mercyhurst
Ryan Carter	F	Iona

2002-03
Player	Pos	Team
Eddy Ferhi	G	Sacred Heart
Brad Roberts	G	Army
Wade Winkler	D	Quinnipiac
Les Hrapchak	D	Sacred Heart
Brandon Doria	F	Holy Cross
Martin Paquet	F	Sacred Heart
Matt Craig	F	Quinnipiac

==== First Team All-Stars by school ====
School	Winners
Quinnipiac	10
Iona	5
Mercyhurst	5
Holy Cross	4
Bentley	3
Sacred Heart	3
Canisius	2
Connecticut	2
American International	1
Army	1

==== Multiple Appearances ====
Player	First Team Appearances
Ryan Carter	3
Steve Tobio	2
Peter Aubry	2
Chris Cerrella	2

=== Second Team ===
1998–99
Player	Pos	Team
Chance Thede	G	American International
Rob Martin	D	Connecticut
Mike Maguire	D	Holy Cross
Mike Sowa	F	American International
Neil Breen	F	Quinnipiac
David Deeves	F	Canisius

1999–00
Player	Pos	Team
Alexis Jutras-Binet	G	Sacred Heart
Nathan Lutz	D	Iona
Jim Whelan	D	Holy Cross
Eric Ellis	F	Mercyhurst
Louis Goulet	F	Mercyhurst
Martin Paquet	F	Sacred Heart

2000-01
Player	Pos	Team
Eddy Ferhi	G	Sacred Heart
Jody Robinson	D	Mercyhurst
Steve Tobio	D	Bentley
Michael Goldkind	F	Connecticut
Louis Goulet	F	Mercyhurst
Tom McMonagle	F	Mercyhurst

2001-02
Player	Pos	Team
Eddy Ferhi	G	Sacred Heart
Nathan Lutz	D	Iona
R. J. Irving	D	Holy Cross
Brandon Doria	F	Holy Cross
Brian Herbert	F	Quinnipiac
Martin Paquet	F	Sacred Heart
Adam Tackaberry	F	Mercyhurst

2002-03
Player	Pos	Team
Simon St. Pierre	G	Bentley
T. J. Kemp	D	Mercyhurst
Joe Dudek	D	Army
Brian Herbert	F	Quinnipiac
Rich Hansen	F	Mercyhurst
Rae Metz	F	Fairfield

==== Second Team All-Stars by school ====
School	Winners
Mercyhurst	8
Sacred Heart	5
Holy Cross	4
Quinnipiac	3
American International	2
Bentley	2
Connecticut	2
Iona	2
Army	1
Canisius	1
Fairfield	1

==== Multiple Appearances ====
Player	Second Team Appearances
Nathan Lutz	2
Louis Goulet	2
Martin Paquet	2
Eddy Ferhi	2
Brian Herbert	2

=== Rookie Team ===
1998–99
Player	Pos	Team
Jon Chain	G	Connecticut
Dan Ennis	D	Quinnipiac
Mike Boylan	D	Connecticut
Joel Tarvudd	D	Canisius
Ryan Carter	F	Iona
Neil Breen	F	Quinnipiac
Patrick Rissmiller	F	Holy Cross
David Deeves	F	Canisius

1999–00
Player	Pos	Team
Mike Fraser	G	Iona
Nathan Lutz	D	Iona
Matt Erhart	D	Quinnipiac
Les Hrapchak	D	Sacred Heart
Rae Metz	F	Fairfield
Martin Paquet	F	Sacred Heart
Brian Herbert	F	Quinnipiac

2000-01
Player	Pos	Team
Justin Eddy	G	Quinnipiac
Eric Nelson	D	Connecticut
R. J. Irving	D	Holy Cross
Adam Tackaberry	F	Mercyhurst
Guillaume Caron	F	American International
Trent Ulmer	F	American International
Greg Kealey	F	Holy Cross

2001-02
Player	Pos	Team
Jamie Holden	G	Quinnipiac
T. J. Kemp	D	Mercyhurst
Adam Rhein	D	Connecticut
Chris Casey	F	Army
Bryan Goodwin	F	Bentley
Rich Hansen	F	Mercyhurst
Brent Williams	F	Iona

2002-03
Player	Pos	Team
Brad Roberts	G	Army
Conrad Martin	D	Mercyhurst
Tim Songin	D	Canisius
Ryan Swanson	D	Iona
Tyler McGregor	F	Holy Cross
Paul Markarian	F	Bentley
Ryan Mayhew	F	Bentley
Scott Reynolds	F	Mercyhurst

==== Rookie Team All-Stars by school ====
School	Winners
Quinnipiac	6
Iona	5
Mercyhurst	5
Connecticut	4
Holy Cross	4
Bentley	3
Canisius	3
American International	2
Army	2
Sacred Heart	2
Fairfield	1

== Individual awards ==
Award
Offensive Player of the Year
Defensive Player of the Year
Goaltender of the Year
Offensive Rookie of the Year
Defensive Rookie of the Year
Coach of the Year
Tournament Most Valuable Player

== See also ==
- Atlantic Hockey Awards
