= Dave Forbes =

Canadian ice hockey player (1948–2024)

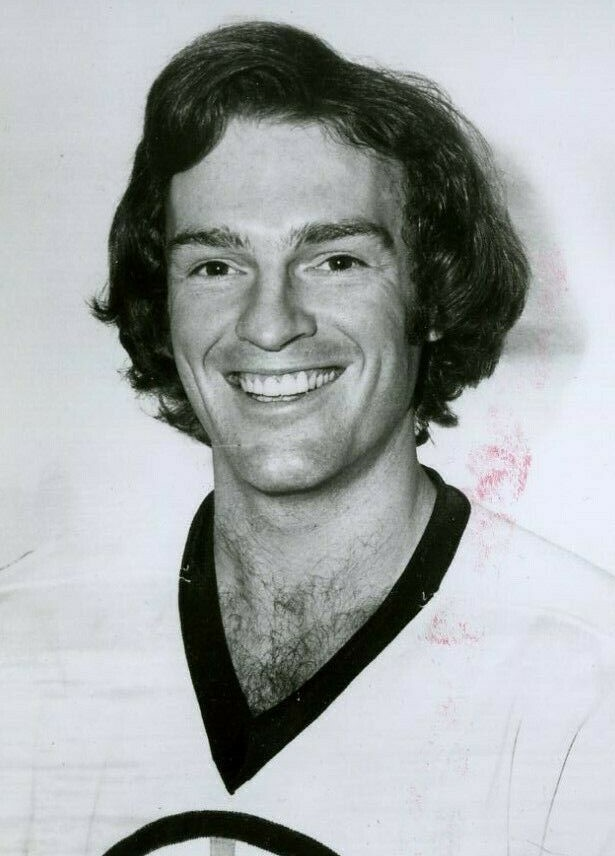
- Born: November 16, 1948 Montreal, Quebec, Canada
- Died: March 25, 2024 (aged 75) Colorado Springs, Colorado, U.S.
- Height: 5 ft 10 in (178 cm)
- Weight: 178 lb (81 kg; 12 st 10 lb)
- Position: Left wing
- Shot: Left
- Played for: Boston Bruins; Washington Capitals; Cincinnati Stingers
- NHL draft: Undrafted
- Playing career: 1971–1980

David Stephen Forbes (November 16, 1948 – March 25, 2024) was a Canadian professional ice hockey player. He played for the Boston Bruins and Washington Capitals of the National Hockey League (NHL) between 1973 and 1978, and for the Cincinnati Stingers of the World Hockey Association between 1978 and 1979.

== Playing career ==
Forbes played for American International College between 1967 and 1971. He signed as a free agent in 1973 with the Boston Bruins and made his NHL debut that year. Forbes made an impact as a defensive-minded forward as he helped guide the Bruins to the finals in 1974 during his rookie season, and to the finals in 1977. Forbes played four seasons with Boston until he was claimed by the Washington Capitals in the Waiver Draft before the 1977–78 season. After playing one season with the Capitals, he was released after only playing two games during the 1978–79 season and signed to play for the Cincinnati Stingers of the World Hockey Association.

== Criminal charges ==
Forbes was charged with aggravated assault in Minneapolis in 1975 after butt-ending Henry Boucha's eye socket in a game against the Minnesota North Stars, leaving Boucha with limited vision in the right eye. The trial received much publicity as it was highly unusual for an athlete to face criminal charges for assault during a game. The trial ended with a hung jury; the charges were not refiled. Forbes was suspended for 10 games by the NHL, and Forbes and the Bruins settled a civil case by paying Boucha over $1 million.

== Post-playing career ==
He was one of five plaintiffs along with Rick Middleton, Brad Park, Ulf Nilsson and Doug Smail in Forbes v. Eagleson, a class action lawsuit filed in 1995 on behalf of about 1,000 NHL players who were employed by NHL teams between 1972 and 1991 against Alan Eagleson, the league and its member clubs. The players alleged that the NHL and its teams violated the Racketeer Influenced and Corrupt Organizations (RICO) Act by colluding with Eagleson to enable him to embezzle from the National Hockey League Players' Association (NHLPA) and that the four-year statute of limitations in civil racketeering cases began when Eagleson was indicted in 1994. The lawsuit was dismissed on August 27, 1998, in United States District Court for the Eastern District of Pennsylvania by Thomas Newman O'Neill Jr. who ruled that the statute of limitations expired because it had begun in 1991 when the players were made aware of the allegations against Eagleson. O'Neill's decision was upheld in the United States Court of Appeals for the Third Circuit on October 17, 2000.

Forbes died on March 25, 2024, at the age of 75.

== Career statistics ==
=== Regular season and playoffs ===
| | | | Regular season | | | | | Playoffs |
| Season | Team | League | GP | G | A | Pts | PIM | GP | G | A | Pts | PIM |
|---|---|---|---|---|---|---|---|---|---|---|---|---|
| 1966–67 | Lachine Maroons | MMJHL | 19 | 4 | 4 | 8 | 30 | — | — | — | — | — |
| 1967–68 | American International University | NCAA-II | 5 | 13 | 10 | 23 | — | — | — | — | — | — |
| 1968–69 | American International University | NCAA-II | 21 | 32 | 25 | 57 | — | — | — | — | — | — |
| 1969–70 | American International University | NCAA-II | 17 | 27 | 15 | 42 | — | — | — | — | — | — |
| 1970–71 | American International University | NCAA-II | 21 | 30 | 22 | 52 | — | — | — | — | — | — |
| 1971–72 | Oklahoma City Blazers | CHL | 42 | 8 | 11 | 19 | 83 | — | — | — | — | — |
| 1971–72 | Boston Braves | AHL | 3 | 0 | 0 | 0 | 2 | 7 | 1 | 0 | 1 | 0 |
| 1971–72 | Dayton Gems | IHL | 10 | 5 | 2 | 7 | 29 | — | — | — | — | — |
| 1972–73 | Boston Braves | AHL | 27 | 10 | 11 | 21 | 32 | 10 | 3 | 5 | 8 | 27 |
| 1972–73 | Dayton Gems | IHL | 49 | 20 | 29 | 49 | 194 | — | — | — | — | — |
| 1973–74 | Boston Bruins | NHL | 63 | 10 | 16 | 26 | 41 | 16 | 0 | 2 | 2 | 6 |
| 1973–74 | Boston Braves | AHL | 11 | 2 | 6 | 8 | 35 | — | — | — | — | — |
| 1974–75 | Boston Bruins | NHL | 69 | 18 | 12 | 30 | 80 | 3 | 0 | 0 | 0 | 0 |
| 1975–76 | Boston Bruins | NHL | 79 | 16 | 13 | 29 | 52 | 12 | 1 | 1 | 2 | 5 |
| 1976–77 | Boston Bruins | NHL | 73 | 9 | 11 | 20 | 47 | 14 | 0 | 1 | 1 | 2 |
| 1977–78 | Washington Capitals | NHL | 77 | 11 | 11 | 22 | 119 | — | — | — | — | — |
| 1978–79 | Washington Capitals | NHL | 2 | 0 | 1 | 1 | 2 | — | — | — | — | — |
| 1978–79 | Cincinnati Stingers | WHA | 73 | 6 | 5 | 11 | 83 | 3 | 0 | 1 | 1 | 7 |
| 1979–80 | Binghamton Dusters | AHL | 38 | 15 | 15 | 30 | 47 | — | — | — | — | — |
| WHA totals | | | 73 | 6 | 5 | 11 | 83 | 3 | 0 | 1 | 1 | 7 |
| NHL totals | | | 363 | 64 | 64 | 128 | 341 | 45 | 1 | 4 | 5 | 13 |
