= MAAC Offensive Rookie of the Year =

- Sport: Ice hockey
- Awarded for: The Offensive Rookie of the Year in the Metro Atlantic Athletic Conference

History
- First award: 1999
- Final award: 2003
- Most recent: Tyler McGregor & Scott Reynolds

The MAAC Offensive Rookie of the Year was an annual award given out at the conclusion of the Metro Atlantic Athletic Conference regular season to the best offensive men's ice hockey freshman in the conference as voted by the coaches of each MAAC team.

The award was discontinued after 2002-03 when the MAAC ice hockey conference was dissolved and all remaining programs reformed in Atlantic Hockey.

== Award winners ==
Year	Winner	Position	School
1998–99	Ryan Carter	Forward	Iona
1999–00	Martin Paquet	Left wing	Sacred Heart
2000-00	Adam Tackaberry	Center	Mercyhurst
2001-02	Chris Casey	Forward	Army
2002-03	Tyler McGregor	Right wing	Holy Cross
	Scott Reynolds	Forward	Mercyhurst

=== Winners by school ===
School	Winners
Mercyhurst	2
Army	1
Holy Cross	1
Iona	1
Sacred Heart	1

=== Winners by position ===
Position	Winners
Center	1
Left wing	1
Right wing	1
Forward	3

== See also ==
- Atlantic Hockey Rookie of the Year
- MAAC Awards
