= MAAC Defensive Player of the Year =

- Sport: Ice hockey
- Awarded for: The Defensive Player of the Year in the Metro Atlantic Athletic Conference

History
- First award: 1999
- Final award: 2003
- Most recent: Wade Winkler

The MAAC Defensive Player of the Year was an annual award given out at the conclusion of the Metro Atlantic Athletic Conference regular season to the best defensive men's ice hockey player in the conference as voted by the coaches of each MAAC team.

The award was discontinued after 2002-03 when the MAAC ice hockey conference was dissolved and all remaining programs reformed in Atlantic Hockey.

== Award winners ==
Year	Winner	Position	School
1998–99	Dan Ennis	Defenceman	Quinnipiac
1999–00	Paul Colontino	Defenceman	Mercyhurst
	Steve Tobio	Defenceman	Bentley
2000-00	Nathan Lutz	Defenceman	Iona
2001-02	Steve Tobio	Defenceman	Bentley
2002-03	Wade Winkler	Defenceman	Quinnipiac

=== Winners by school ===
School	Winners
Bentley	2
Quinnipiac	2
Iona	1
Mercyhurst	1

=== Winners by position ===
Position	Winners
Defenceman	6

== See also ==
- Atlantic Hockey Player of the Year
- MAAC Awards
