= MAAC Defensive Rookie of the Year =

- Sport: Ice hockey
- Awarded for: The Offensive Rookie of the Year in the Metro Atlantic Athletic Conference

History
- First award: 1999
- Final award: 2003
- Most recent: Brad Roberts

The MAAC Defensive Rookie of the Year was an annual award given out at the conclusion of the Metro Atlantic Athletic Conference regular season to the best defensive men's ice hockey freshman in the conference as voted by the coaches of each MAAC team.

The award was discontinued after 2002-03 when the MAAC ice hockey conference was dissolved and all remaining programs reformed in Atlantic Hockey.

== Award winners ==
Year	Winner	Position	School
1998–99	Dan Ennis	Defenceman	Quinnipiac
1999–00	Nathan Lutz	Defenceman	Iona
2000-00	Eric Nelson	Defenceman	Connecticut
2001-02	Jamie Holden	Goaltender	Quinnipiac
2002-03	Brad Roberts	Goaltender	Army

=== Winners by school ===
School	Winners
Quinnipiac	2
Army	1
Connecticut	1
Iona	1

=== Winners by position ===
Position	Winners
Defenceman	3
Goaltender	2

== See also ==
- Atlantic Hockey Rookie of the Year
- MAAC Awards
