= Atlantic Hockey Rookie of the Year =

- Sport: Ice hockey
- Awarded for: The Rookie of the Year in the Atlantic Hockey Association

History
- First award: 2004
- Final award: 2024
- Most recent: Matteo Giampa

The Atlantic Hockey Rookie of the Year was an annual award given out at the conclusion of the Atlantic Hockey regular season to the best freshman in the conference as voted by the coaches of each Atlantic Hockey team.

== Award winners ==
Year	Winner	Position	School
2003–04	Pierre-Luc O'Brien	Left Wing	Sacred Heart
2004–05	Ben Cottreau	Center	Mercyhurst
2005–06	Bear Trapp	Right Wing	Sacred Heart
2006–07	Al Mazur	Defenceman	RIT
2007–08	Erik Peterson	Forward	Bentley
2008–09	David Kostuch	Left Wing	Canisius
2009–10	Christopher Tanev	Defenceman	RIT
2010–11	Taylor Holstrom	Forward	Mercyhurst
2011–12	Alex Grieve	Center	Bentley
2012–13	Andrew Gladiuk	Forward	Bentley
2013–14	Justin Danforth	Forward	Sacred Heart

Year	Winner	Position	School
2014–15	Tyler Pham	Center	Army
2015–16	Lester Lancaster	Defenceman	Mercyhurst
2016–17	Adam Brubacher	Defenceman	RIT
2017–18	Brennan Kapcheck	Defenceman	American International
2018–19	Ludwig Stenlund	Forward	Niagara
2019–20	Braeden Tuck	Forward	Sacred Heart
2020–21	Lincoln Hatten	Forward	Army
2020–21	Randy Hernández	Right Wing	Robert Morris
2021–22	Carter Wilkie	Forward	RIT
2022–23	Max Itagaki	Forward	Army
2023–24	Matteo Giampa	Right Wing	Army

=== Winners by school ===
School	Winners
RIT	4
Sacred Heart	4
Army	3
Bentley	3
Mercyhurst	3
American International	1
Canisius	1
Niagara	1
Robert Morris	1

=== Winners by position ===
Position	Winners
Center	3
Right Wing	3
Left Wing	2
Forward	9
Defenceman	5
Goaltender	0

== See also ==
- Atlantic Hockey Awards
- MAAC Offensive Rookie of the Year
- MAAC Defensive Rookie of the Year
