= Derek Hines Unsung Hero Award =

- Sport: Ice hockey
- Awarded for: To the player who displays exemplary sportsmanship, is supremely competitive, intelligent and extraordinarily conditioned with an unmatched work ethic.

History
- First award: 2006
- Most recent: Kevin Anderson

The Derek Hines Unsung Hero Award is an annual award given out to the NCAA Division I player judged to best exemplify the qualities of sportsmanship, competitiveness, intelligence and work ethic. The award is named in honor of Derek Hines, a 4-year letter-winner for Army who was killed while serving in Afghanistan on September 1, 2005.

== Winners ==
| Year | Winner | Position | School |
|---|---|---|---|
| 2006–07 | Dan Shribman | Forward | Dartmouth |
| 2007–08 | Chase Podsiad | Defenceman | Army |
| 2008–09 | Michael Phillipich | Forward | Air Force |
| 2009–10 | Jordan Pietrus | Right wing | Brown |
| 2010–11 | Kyle Schmidt | Forward | Minnesota–Duluth |
| 2011–12 | Bobby Farnham | Forward | Brown |
| 2012–13 | Kyle Murphy | Forward | Providence |
| 2013–14 | Brice O'Connor | Defenceman | Maine |
| 2014–15 | P. J. Musico | Goaltender | Penn State |
| 2015–16 | Matt Vidal | Forward | Holy Cross |
| 2016–17 | Aidan Cavallini | Forward | Wisconsin |
| 2017–18 | Dylan Abood | Defenceman | Air Force |
| 2018–19 | Brendon Kearney | Left wing | Ohio State |
| 2019–20 | Jared Pike | Left wing | American International |
| 2020–21 | Josh Kosack | Right wing | Union |
| 2021–22 | Jordan Seyfert | Center | Merrimack |
| 2022–23 | Noah Wilson | Defenceman | Army |
| 2023–24 | Luke Robinson | Defenceman | Air Force |
| 2024–25 | Jacob Truscott | Defenceman | Michigan |
| 2025–26 | Kevin Anderson | Forward | Princeton |

=== Winners by school ===
| School | Winners |
|---|---|
| Air Force | 3 |
| Army | 2 |
| Brown | 2 |
| American International | 1 |
| Dartmouth | 1 |
| Holy Cross | 1 |
| Maine | 1 |
| Merrimack | 1 |
| Michigan | 1 |
| Minnesota–Duluth | 1 |
| Ohio State | 1 |
| Penn State | 1 |
| Princeton | 1 |
| Providence | 1 |
| Union | 1 |
| Wisconsin | 1 |

=== Winners by position ===
| Position | Winners |
|---|---|
| Center | 1 |
| Left wing | 2 |
| Right wing | 2 |
| Forward | 8 |
| Defenceman | 7 |
| Goaltender | 1 |
