= 2002–03 NCAA Division I men's ice hockey rankings =

- NCAA tournament: 2003
- NCAA champion: Minnesota
- Preseason No. 1 (USA Today): Minnesota
- Preseason No. 1 (USCHO): Minnesota
- NCAA Division I men's ice hockey rankings

Two human polls made up the 2002–03 NCAA Division I men's ice hockey rankings, the USCHO.com Division I Men's Poll and the USA TODAY/American Hockey Magazine Poll. As the 2002–03 season progressed, rankings were updated weekly. There were a total of 17 voters in the USA Today poll and 40 voters in the USCHO.com poll. Each first place vote in either poll is worth 15 points in the rankings with every subsequent vote worth 1 fewer point.

== Legend ==
	Increase in ranking
	Decrease in ranking
	Not ranked previous week
(Italics)	Number of first place votes
#–#–#	Win–loss–tie record
†	Tied with team above or below also with this symbol

== USA TODAY/American Hockey Magazine Poll ==
	Preseason Sep 30	Week 1 Oct 7	Week 2 Oct 14	Week 3 Oct 21	Week 4 Oct 28	Week 5 Nov 4	Week 6 Nov 11	Week 7 Nov 18	Week 8 Nov 25	Week 9 Dec 2	Week 10 Dec 9	Week 11 Dec 16	Week 12 Dec 30	Week 13 Jan 6	Week 14 Jan 13	Week 15 Jan 20	Week 16 Jan 27	Week 17 Feb 3	Week 18 Feb 10	Week 19 Feb 17	Week 20 Feb 24	Week 21 Mar 3	Week 22 Mar 10	Week 23 Mar 17	Week 24 Mar 24	Week 25 Mar 31	
1	Minnesota (12)	Minnesota (12) 0–0–0	Minnesota (9) 1–0–0	New Hampshire (13) 2–0–1	New Hampshire (7) 2–0–2	Denver (12) 7–1–0	Boston College (9) 6–0–1	Boston College (16) 8–0–1	Boston College (5) 9–1–1	Maine (4) 10–1–1	Maine (5) 11–1–2	Maine (9) 13–1–2	Maine; 15–1–2	North Dakota (10) 18–1–3	Maine (6) 18–2–2	Maine (7) 19–2–3	North Dakota (6) 21–2–3	Colorado College (15) 21–2–5	Colorado College (11) 22–3–5	Colorado College (12) 23–4–5	Colorado College (12) 23–4–5	Colorado College (11) 24–5–5	Colorado College (16) 26–5–5	Colorado College (16) 28–5–5	Cornell (11) 28–4–1	Cornell (14) 30–4–1	1
2	Michigan (1)	Denver (4) 0–0–0	Denver (7) 2–0–0	Minnesota (2) 1–1–1	Denver (4) 5–1–0	Boston College (2) 5–0–1	New Hampshire (6) 5–1–2	New Hampshire (1) 6–1–2	New Hampshire (6) 8–2–2	New Hampshire (4) 9–2–2	North Dakota (7) 14–1–1	North Dakota (8) 16–1–1	North Dakota; 18–1–1	Colorado College (6) 16–2–4	Colorado College (7) 16–2–4	North Dakota (7) 21–2–3	Maine (7) 20–2–4	Maine (2) 21–3–4	Cornell (5) 19–4–0	Cornell (5) 20–4–1	Cornell (5) 22–4–1	Cornell (6) 24–4–1	Cornell (1) 24–4–1	Cornell (1) 26–4–1	Colorado College (6) 29–6–5	Minnesota (3) 26–8–9	2
3	Denver (2)	Michigan; 0–0–0	New Hampshire; 1–0–0	Denver (1) 3–1–0	Boston College (4) 5–0–0	Minnesota; 4–1–2	Denver (1) 8–2–0	Denver; 9–2–1	North Dakota (2) 11–1–0	North Dakota † (4) 12–1–1	Colorado College (4) 13–1–2	Cornell; 10–1–0	Colorado College; 16–2–2	Maine (1) 16–2–2	North Dakota (4) 19–2–3	Colorado College (3) 17–2–5	Colorado College (4) 19–2–5	North Dakota; 21–4–3	Maine (1) 22–4–4	Maine; 22–5–5	Maine; 23–6–5	New Hampshire; 21–7–6	New Hampshire; 23–7–6	New Hampshire; 25–7–6	New Hampshire; 25–7–6	New Hampshire; 27–7–6	3
4	New Hampshire	New Hampshire; 0–0–0	Boston University (1) 1–0–1	Boston College (1) 3–0–0	Minnesota (1) 2–1–2	New Hampshire (1) 3–1–2	Michigan; 6–1–1	Colorado College †; 9–1–2	Maine (2) 9–1–1	Boston College † (3) 9–2–1	Cornell (1) 10–1–0	New Hampshire; 10–3–2	Minnesota; 11–4–4	Cornell; 12–3–0	Cornell; 12–3–0	Cornell; 14–3–0	Cornell; 16–3–0	New Hampshire; 18–6–3	Boston College; 18–6–3	New Hampshire; 19–7–4	New Hampshire; 20–7–5	Maine; 24–7–5	Ferris State; 27–8–1	Ferris State; 29–8–1	Minnesota; 24–8–9	Michigan; 30–9–3	4
5	Boston University (1)	Boston University; 0–0–0	Maine; 1–0–0	Michigan; 3–1–0	Michigan †; 5–1–0	North Dakota (1) 6–0–0	North Dakota; 7–1–0	North Dakota †; 9–1–0	Denver (1) 10–2–2	Colorado College (1) 11–1–2	New Hampshire; 10–3–2	Colorado College; 14–2–2	Denver; 14–5–3	New Hampshire; 13–4–2	New Hampshire; 13–4–2	New Hampshire; 15–4–3	New Hampshire; 17–5–3	Cornell; 17–4–0	North Dakota; 22–5–3	North Dakota; 22–6–4	Boston College; 21–8–3	Ferris State; 25–8–1	Boston College; 23–9–4	Minnesota; 22–8–9	Michigan; 28–9–3	Colorado College; 30–7–5	5
6	Maine	Maine †; 0–0–0	Cornell; 0–0–0	Boston University; 1–0–2	North Dakota †; 4–0–0	Michigan †; 5–1–0	Cornell (1) 3–0–0	Michigan; 8–1–1	Colorado College (1) 9–1–2	Denver; 12–2–2	Boston College; 9–3–2	Boston College; 9–3–3	Cornell; 10–3–0	Denver; 14–5–3	Denver; 15–6–3	Ohio State; 17–4–2	Boston College; 15–6–3	Boston College; 16–6–3	New Hampshire; 18–7–3	Minnesota; 17–7–7	Ferris State; 23–8–1	Boston College; 21–9–4	Minnesota; 20–8–9	Boston College; 23–10–4	Ferris State; 30–10–1	Ferris State; 31–11–1	6
7	Michigan State	Michigan State †; 0–0–0	North Dakota; 2–0–0	North Dakota; 2–0–0	Cornell; 0–0–0	Boston University † (1) 4–1–2	Colorado College; 8–1–1	Maine; 8–1–1	Cornell; 6–1–0	Cornell (1) 8–1–0	Denver; 12–4–2	Minnesota; 9–4–4	New Hampshire; 11–4–2	Minnesota; 11–5–5	Ohio State; 15–4–2	Boston College; 14–5–3	Minnesota; 12–6–7	Minnesota; 14–6–7	Minnesota; 15–7–7	Boston College; 19–8–3	Minnesota; 18–8–7	Minnesota; 19–8–8	Boston University; 23–12–3	Boston University; 24–13–3	Boston University; 24–13–3	Boston University; 25–14–3	7
8	Cornell	Cornell; 0–0–0	Boston College; 1–0–0	Colorado College; 3–1–0	Colorado College; 4–1–1	Providence; 7–0–0	Minnesota; 5–2–2	Cornell; 4–1–0	Michigan; 9–2–1	Michigan; 11–2–1	Minnesota; 9–4–4	Denver; 12–5–3	Boston College; 10–4–3	Michigan; 14–5–1	Minnesota; 12–6–5	Minnesota; 12–6–5	Michigan; 17–6–1	Michigan; 18–7–1	Michigan; 20–7–1	Ferris State; 23–8–1	Michigan; 23–8–1	Minnesota State-Mankato; 17–8–9	Michigan; 24–9–3	Michigan; 26–9–3	Boston College; 23–10–4	Boston College; 24–11–4	8
9	St. Cloud State	Boston College; 0–0–0	Michigan; 1–1–0	Cornell; 0–0–0	Maine; 3–1–1	Colorado College †; 6–1–1	Boston University; 5–1–2	Minnesota; 5–3–3	Minnesota; 7–3–3	Ferris State; 11–3–0	Ferris State †; 12–4–0	Michigan; 11–4–1	Ohio State; 13–4–2	Ohio State; 14–4–2	Boston College; 12–5–3	Michigan; 15–6–1	Denver; 15–7–4	Denver; 17–7–4	Ohio State; 20–6–3	Michigan; 21–8–1	Minnesota State-Mankato; 16–7–9	Michigan; 24–9–1	Minnesota State-Mankato; 18–8–10	Minnesota State-Mankato; 20–8–10	Maine; 24–9–5	Maine; 24–10–5	9
10	Colorado College	St. Cloud State; 0–0–0	Michigan State; 1–1–0	Maine; 2–1–0	Boston University; 2–1–2	Cornell †; 1–0–0	Maine; 6–1–1	Boston University; 5–3–2	Ferris State; 11–3–0	Minnesota; 7–4–4	Michigan †; 11–4–1	Ferris State; 12–4–0	Michigan; 12–5–1	Boston University; 13–6–2	Ferris State; 16–5–1	Denver; 15–7–4	Ohio State; 17–6–2	Ohio State; 18–6–3	Ferris State; 21–8–1	Boston University; 20–10–2	North Dakota; 22–8–4	Boston University; 21–12–3	Maine; 24–9–5	Maine; 24–9–5	Minnesota State-Mankato; 20–10–10	Minnesota State-Mankato; 20–11–10	10
11	Northern Michigan (1)	Northern Michigan (1) 1–0–0	Colorado College; 1–1–0	Providence; 4–0–0	Providence; 5–0–0	Maine; 5–1–1	Providence; 8–1–0	Miami; 11–3–0	Miami; 12–3–1	Miami; 12–3–1	Harvard; 9–3–0	Ohio State; 12–4–1	Boston University; 11–6–2	Ferris State; 15–5–0	Michigan; 15–6–1	Ferris State; 17–6–1	Ferris State; 18–7–1	Ferris State; 19–8–1	Boston University; 17–10–2	Ohio State; 21–7–3	Boston University; 20–11–3	North Dakota; 22–9–5	North Dakota; 24–9–5	North Dakota; 26–10–5	Harvard; 22–9–2	Harvard; 22–10–2	11
12	Boston College †	Colorado College; 0–0–0	Harvard; 0–0–0	Harvard; 0–0–0	Michigan State; 4–2–0	Ferris State; 7–1–0	Ferris State; 8–2–0	Ferris State †; 9–3–0	Boston University; 6–3–2	Harvard; 7–3–0	Ohio State; 10–4–1	Harvard; 9–4–1	Ferris State; 13–5–0	Boston College; 10–5–3	Boston University; 13–7–2	St. Cloud State; 11–8–3	Boston University; 14–10–2	Boston University; 15–10–2	Harvard; 14–7–1	Minnesota State-Mankato; 14–7–9	Harvard; 18–8–1	Harvard; 19–8–2	Harvard; 19–8–2	Harvard; 21–8–2	North Dakota; 26–11–5	Ohio State; 24–13–5	12
13	North Dakota †	North Dakota; 0–0–0	Providence; 2–0–0	Michigan State; 2–2–0	Ferris State; 5–1–0	Michigan State; 4–2–0	Brown; 3–0–0	Providence †; 8–3–0	Harvard; 5–2–0	Boston University; 7–5–2	Miami; 12–5–1	Boston University; 9–6–2	Miami; 13–6–1	Harvard; 11–5–1	Harvard; 12–6–1	Harvard; 12–6–1	Harvard; 12–6–1	Harvard; 13–6–1	Minnesota State-Mankato; 12–7–9	Harvard; 16–8–1	Denver; 20–9–5	Providence; 19–12–3	Ohio State; 22–10–5	Ohio State; 24–10–5	Ohio State; 24–12–5	North Dakota; 26–12–5	13
14	Harvard	Harvard; 0–0–0	Northern Michigan; 1–1–1	Northern Michigan; 2–2–1	Harvard; 0–0–0	Miami; 8–2–0	Miami; 9–3–0	Ohio State; 8–2–1	Ohio State; 8–4–1	Ohio State; 8–4–1	Northern Michigan; 9–5–1	Miami; 12–5–1	Dartmouth; 8–4–0	Massachusetts; 12–7–1	Miami; 14–8–2	Boston University; 13–9–2	St. Cloud State; 12–9–3	Minnesota State-Mankato; 12–7–9	Denver; 17–9–4	Denver; 18–9–5	Providence; 18–12–3	Denver; 20–10–6	Denver; 20–12–6	Michigan State; 23–13–2	Minnesota-Duluth; 22–15–5	Minnesota-Duluth; 22–15–5	14
15	Ohio State	Ohio State; 0–0–0	St. Cloud State; 1–1–0	Notre Dame; 3–0–1	St. Cloud State; 2–1–1	St. Cloud State; 3–2–1	St. Cloud State; 4–3–1	Harvard; 4–1–0	Providence; 8–4–1	Yale; 6–3–0	Boston University; 8–6–2	Northern Michigan; 9–6–1	Harvard; 10–5–1	St. Cloud State; 8–7–3	St. Cloud State; 9–8–3	Massachusetts; 13–10–1	Minnesota State-Mankato; 10–7–9	St. Cloud State; 13–10–3	St. Cloud State; 13–10–3	St. Cloud State; 14–11–3	Ohio State; 21–9–3	Ohio State; 22–10–3	Michigan State; 21–13–2	Denver; 21–14–6	Michigan State; 23–14–2	Michigan State; 23–14–2	15
	Preseason Sep 30	Week 1 Oct 7	Week 2 Oct 14	Week 3 Oct 21	Week 4 Oct 28	Week 5 Nov 4	Week 6 Nov 11	Week 7 Nov 18	Week 8 Nov 25	Week 9 Dec 2	Week 10 Dec 9	Week 11 Dec 16	Week 12 Dec 30	Week 13 Jan 6	Week 14 Jan 13	Week 15 Jan 20	Week 16 Jan 27	Week 17 Feb 3	Week 18 Feb 10	Week 19 Feb 17	Week 20 Feb 24	Week 21 Mar 3	Week 22 Mar 10	Week 23 Mar 17	Week 24 Mar 24	Week 25 Mar 31	
		Dropped: None	Dropped: Ohio State; 0–1–0	Dropped: St. Cloud State; 1–1–0	Dropped: Northern Michigan; 2–4–1; Notre Dame; 3–2–1	Dropped: Harvard; 0–1–0	Dropped: Michigan State; 5–3–0	Dropped: Brown; 4–1–0; St. Cloud State; 5–4–1	Dropped: None	Dropped: Providence; 9–5–1	Dropped: Yale; 7–4–0	Dropped: None	Dropped: Northern Michigan; 10–7–1	Dropped: Miami; 13–8–1; Dartmouth; 9–4–0	Dropped: Massachusetts; 13–8–1	Dropped: Miami; 14–10–2	Dropped: Massachusetts; 14–11–1	Dropped: None	Dropped: None	Dropped: None	Dropped: St. Cloud State; 14–12–4	Dropped: None	Dropped: Providence; 19–14–3	Dropped: None	Dropped: Denver; 21–14–6	Dropped: None	

== USCHO.com Division I Men's Poll ==
	Preseason Sep 30	Week 1 Oct 7	Week 2 Oct 14	Week 3 Oct 21	Week 4 Oct 28	Week 5 Nov 4	Week 6 Nov 11	Week 7 Nov 18	Week 8 Nov 25	Week 9 Dec 2	Week 10 Dec 9	Week 11 Dec 16	Week 12 Dec 30	Week 13 Jan 6	Week 14 Jan 13	Week 15 Jan 20	Week 16 Jan 27	Week 17 Feb 3	Week 18 Feb 10	Week 19 Feb 17	Week 20 Feb 24	Week 21 Mar 3	Week 22 Mar 10	Week 23 Mar 17	Week 24 Mar 25	
1	Minnesota (22)	Minnesota (23) 0–0–0	Minnesota (24) 1–0–0	New Hampshire (34) 2–0–1	New Hampshire (20) 2–0–2	Denver (27) 7–1–0	Boston College (29) 6–0–1	Boston College (37) 8–0–1	Boston College (11) 9–1–1	North Dakota (21) 12–1–1	North Dakota (28) 14–1–1	North Dakota (26) 16–1–1	North Dakota (24) 18–1–1	North Dakota (31) 18–1–3	Maine (25) 18–2–2	Maine (19) 19–2–3	Maine (23) 20–2–4	Colorado College (35) 21–2–5	Colorado College (32) 22–3–5	Colorado College (30) 23–4–5	Colorado College (32) 23–4–5	Colorado College (22) 24–5–5	Colorado College (33) 26–5–5	Colorado College (35) 28–5–5	Cornell (28) 28–4–1	1
2	Denver (12)	Denver (12) 0–0–0	Denver (14) 2–0–0	Denver (1) 3–1–0	Denver (10) 5–1–0	Boston College (3) 5–0–1	New Hampshire (7) 5–1–2	New Hampshire (3) 6–1–2	North Dakota (9) 11–1–0	New Hampshire (6) 9–2–2	Maine (7) 11–1–2	Maine (14) 13–1–2	Maine (15) 15–1–2	Colorado College (3) 16–2–4	Colorado College (7) 16–2–4	North Dakota (20) 21–2–3	North Dakota (13) 21–2–3	Maine (5) 21–3–4	Maine (5) 22–4–4	Cornell (10) 20–4–1	Cornell (8) 22–4–1	Cornell (17) 24–4–1	Cornell (7) 24–4–1	Cornell (5) 26–4–1	Colorado College (12) 29–6–5	2
3	Michigan (3)	Michigan (3) 0–0–0	New Hampshire (1) 0–0–0	Minnesota (2) 1–1–1	Boston College (10) 5–0–0	New Hampshire (4) 3–1–2	Denver (3) 8–2–0	North Dakota; 9–1–0	New Hampshire (10) 8–2–2	Maine (6) 10–1–1	Colorado College (4) 13–1–2	Cornell; 10–1–0	Colorado College (1) 16–2–2	Maine (5) 16–2–2	North Dakota (8) 19–2–3	Colorado College (1) 17–2–5	Colorado College (4) 19–2–5	North Dakota; 21–4–3	Cornell (2) 19–4–0	Maine; 22–5–5	Boston College; 21–8–3	New Hampshire (1) 21–7–6	New Hampshire; 23–7–6	New Hampshire; 25–7–6	New Hampshire; 25–7–6	3
4	New Hampshire (1)	New Hampshire (1) 0–0–0	Boston University; 1–0–1	Boston College (4) 3–0–0	Minnesota; 2–1–2	Minnesota (1) 4–1–2	North Dakota; 7–1–0	Denver; 9–2–1	Maine (7) 9–1–1	Boston College (1) 9–2–1	Cornell (1) 10–1–0	Colorado College; 14–2–2	Minnesota; 11–4–4	Cornell (1) 12–3–0	Cornell; 12–3–0	Cornell; 14–3–0	Cornell; 16–3–0	New Hampshire; 18–6–3	Boston College (4) 18–6–3	New Hampshire; 19–7–4	New Hampshire; 20–7–5	Maine; 24–7–5	Ferris State; 27–8–1	Ferris State; 29–8–1	Minnesota; 24–8–9	4
5	Boston University (2)	Boston University (1) 0–0–0	Maine (1) 1–0–0	Michigan; 3–1–0	Michigan; 5–1–0	North Dakota (2) 6–0–0	Michigan; 6–1–1	Michigan; 8–1–1	Colorado College †; 9–1–2	Colorado College (1) 11–1–2	New Hampshire; 10–3–2	New Hampshire; 10–3–2	Cornell; 10–3–0	New Hampshire; 13–4–2	New Hampshire; 14–4–2	New Hampshire; 16–4–3	New Hampshire; 17–5–3	Cornell; 17–4–0	North Dakota; 22–5–3	Boston College; 19–8–3	Maine; 23–6–5	Ferris State; 25–8–1	Boston College; 23–9–4	Minnesota; 22–8–9	Ferris State; 30–9–1	5
6	Maine	Maine; 0–0–0	Michigan; 1–1–0	Boston University; 1–0–2	North Dakota; 4–0–0	Michigan; 5–1–0	Minnesota; 5–2–2	Colorado College; 9–1–2	Denver †; 10–2–2	Denver; 12–2–2	Boston College; 9–3–2	Boston College; 9–3–3	New Hampshire; 11–4–2	Denver; 14–5–3	Minnesota; 12–6–5	Boston College; 14–5–3	Boston College; 15–6–3	Boston College; 16–6–3	New Hampshire; 18–7–3	Minnesota; 17–7–7	Ferris State; 23–8–1	Boston College; 21–9–4	Minnesota; 20–8–9	Boston College; 23–10–4	Boston University; 24–13–3	6
7	Michigan State	Michigan State; 0–0–0	Boston College; 1–0–0	North Dakota; 2–0–0	Boston University; 2–1–2	Boston University (1) 4–1–2	Boston University; 5–1–2	Maine; 8–1–1	Cornell; 6–1–0	Cornell; 8–1–0	Denver; 12–4–2	Minnesota; 9–4–4	Boston College; 10–4–3	Minnesota; 11–5–5	Denver; 15–6–3	Minnesota; 12–6–5	Michigan; 17–6–1	Minnesota; 14–6–7	Minnesota; 15–7–7	North Dakota; 22–6–4	Minnesota; 18–8–7	Minnesota; 19–8–8	Michigan; 24–9–3	Boston University; 24–13–3	Michigan; 28–9–3	7
8	Cornell	Cornell; 0–0–0	Cornell; 0–0–0	Cornell; 0–0–0	Cornell; 0–0–0	Cornell; 1–0–0	Colorado College; 8–1–1	Cornell; 4–1–0	Michigan; 9–2–1	Michigan; 11–2–1	Minnesota; 9–4–4	Ferris State; 12–4–0	Denver; 14–5–3	Michigan; 14–5–1	Boston College; 12–5–3	Ohio State; 17–4–2	Minnesota; 12–6–7	Michigan; 18–7–1	Michigan; 20–7–1	Ferris State; 23–8–1	Michigan; 23–8–1	Michigan; 24–9–1	Boston University; 23–12–3	Michigan; 26–9–3	Boston College; 23–10–4	8
9	Boston College	Boston College; 0–0–0	North Dakota; 2–0–0	Maine; 2–1–0	Colorado College; 4–1–1	Colorado College (1) 6–1–1	Cornell; 3–0–0	Minnesota; 5–3–3	Minnesota; 7–3–3	Ferris State; 11–3–0	Ferris State; 12–4–0	Denver; 12–5–3	Ohio State; 13–4–2	Ohio State; 14–4–2	Ohio State; 15–4–2	Michigan; 15–6–1	Ferris State; 18–7–1	Ferris State; 19–8–1	Ferris State; 21–8–1	Boston University; 20–10–2	North Dakota; 22–8–4	Minnesota State-Mankato; 17–8–9	Maine; 24–9–5	Minnesota State-Mankato; 20–8–10	Maine; 24–9–5	9
10	Colorado College	Colorado College; 0–0–0	Michigan State; 1–1–0	Colorado College; 3–1–0	Maine; 3–1–1	Providence (1) 7–0–0	Maine; 6–1–1	Boston University; 5–3–2	Ferris State; 11–3–0	Minnesota; 7–4–4	Michigan; 11–4–1	Michigan; 11–4–1	Michigan; 12–5–1	Boston College; 10–5–3	Michigan; 15–6–1	Ferris State; 17–6–1	Ohio State; 17–6–2	Ohio State; 18–6–3	Ohio State; 20–6–3	Michigan; 21–8–1	Minnesota State-Mankato; 16–7–9	Boston University; 21–12–3	Minnesota State-Mankato; 18–8–10	Maine; 24–9–5	Harvard; 22–9–2	10
11	St. Cloud State	St. Cloud State; 0–0–0	Colorado College; 1–1–0	Providence; 4–0–0	Providence; 5–0–0	Maine; 5–1–1	Providence (1) 8–1–0	Miami; 11–3–0	Boston University; 6–3–2	Miami; 12–3–1	Harvard; 9–3–0	Ohio State; 12–4–1	Ferris State; 12–5–0	Boston University; 13–6–2	Ferris State; 16–5–1	Denver; 15–7–4	Denver; 15–7–4	Denver; 17–7–4	Boston University; 17–10–2	Ohio State; 21–7–3	Boston University; 20–11–3	North Dakota; 22–9–5	North Dakota; 24–9–5	North Dakota; 26–10–5	Minnesota State-Mankato; 20–10–10	11
12	Northern Michigan	Northern Michigan; 1–0–0	St. Cloud State; 1–1–0	Michigan State; 2–2–0	Michigan State; 4–2–0	Ferris State; 7–1–0	Ferris State; 8–2–0	Ferris State; 9–3–0	Miami; 12–3–1	Harvard; 7–3–0	Ohio State; 10–4–1	Harvard; 9–4–1	Boston University; 11–6–2	Ferris State; 15–5–0	Boston University; 13–7–2	St. Cloud State; 11–8–3	St. Cloud State; 12–9–3	Boston University; 15–10–2	Minnesota State-Mankato; 12–7–9	Minnesota State-Mankato; 14–7–9	Denver; 20–9–5	Harvard; 19–8–2	Harvard; 19–8–2	Harvard; 21–8–2	North Dakota; 26–11–5	12
13	North Dakota	North Dakota; 0–0–0	Harvard; 0–0–0	St. Cloud State; 1–1–0	Ferris State; 5–1–0	Michigan State; 4–2–0	Miami; 9–3–0	Ohio State; 8–2–1	Harvard; 5–2–0	Boston University; 7–5–2	Miami; 12–5–1	Miami; 12–5–1	Harvard; 9–5–1	Harvard; 11–5–1	Harvard; 12–6–1	Harvard; 12–6–1	Harvard; 12–6–1	Harvard; 13–6–1	Harvard; 14–7–1	Denver; 18–9–5	Harvard; 18–8–1	Providence; 19–12–3	Ohio State; 22–10–5	Ohio State; 24–10–5	Ohio State; 25–12–5	13
14	Harvard	Harvard; 0–0–0	Northern Michigan; 1–1–1	Harvard; 0–0–0	St. Cloud State; 2–1–1	Miami; 8–2–0	St. Cloud State; 4–3–1	Providence; 8–3–0	Providence; 8–4–1	Ohio State; 8–4–1	Boston University †; 8–6–2	Boston University; 9–6–2	Miami †; 13–6–1	Dartmouth; 9–4–0	St. Cloud State; 9–8–3	Boston University; 13–9–2	Boston University; 14–10–2	Minnesota State-Mankato; 12–7–9	Denver; 17–9–4	St. Cloud State; 14–11–3	Ohio State; 21–9–3	Denver; 20–10–6	Denver; 20–12–6	Michigan State; 23–13–2	Minnesota-Duluth; 22–15–5	14
15	Ohio State	Ohio State; 0–0–0	Providence; 2–0–0	Northern Michigan; 2–2–1	Harvard; 0–0–0	St. Cloud State; 3–2–1	Brown; 3–0–0	Harvard; 4–1–0	Ohio State; 8–4–1	Providence; 9–5–1	Northern Michigan †; 9–5–1	Northern Michigan; 9–6–1	Northern Michigan †; 10–6–1	Massachusetts; 12–7–1	Massachusetts; 13–8–1	Minnesota State-Mankato; 10–7–7	Minnesota State-Mankato; 10–7–9	St. Cloud State; 13–10–3	St. Cloud State; 13–10–3	Harvard; 16–8–1	Providence; 18–12–3	Ohio State; 22–10–3	Michigan State; 21–13–2	Minnesota-Duluth; 20–14–5	St. Cloud State; 17–15–5	15
	Preseason Sep 30	Week 1 Oct 7	Week 2 Oct 14	Week 3 Oct 21	Week 4 Oct 28	Week 5 Nov 4	Week 6 Nov 11	Week 7 Nov 18	Week 8 Nov 25	Week 9 Dec 2	Week 10 Dec 9	Week 11 Dec 16	Week 12 Dec 30	Week 13 Jan 6	Week 14 Jan 13	Week 15 Jan 20	Week 16 Jan 27	Week 17 Feb 3	Week 18 Feb 10	Week 19 Feb 17	Week 20 Feb 24	Week 21 Mar 3	Week 22 Mar 10	Week 23 Mar 17	Week 24 Mar 25	
		Dropped: None	Dropped: Ohio State; 0–1–0	Dropped: None	Dropped: Northern Michigan; 2–4–1	Dropped: Harvard; 0–1–0	Dropped: Michigan State; 5–3–0	Dropped: St. Cloud State; 5–4–1; Brown; 4–1–0	Dropped: None	Dropped: None	Dropped: Providence; 9–6–1	Dropped: None	Dropped: None	Dropped: Miami; 13–8–1; Northern Michigan; 10–6–1	Dropped: Dartmouth; 9–6–0	Dropped: Massachusetts; 13–10–1	Dropped: None	Dropped: None	Dropped: None	Dropped: None	Dropped: St. Cloud State; 14–12–4	Dropped: None	Dropped: Providence; 19–14–3	Dropped: Denver; 21–14–6	Dropped: Michigan State; 23–14–2	
