= MAAC Tournament Most Valuable Player =

- Sport: Ice hockey
- Awarded for: The Most Valuable Player in the Metro Atlantic Athletic Conference Tournament

History
- First award: 1999
- Final award: 2003
- Most recent: David Wrigley

The MAAC Tournament Most Valuable Player was an annual award given out at the conclusion of the Metro Atlantic Athletic Conference men's ice hockey tournament to the most valuable player in the championship as voted by the coaches of each MAAC team.

The award was discontinued after 2003 when the MAAC ice hockey conference was dissolved and all remaining programs reformed in Atlantic Hockey.

== Award winners ==
Year	Winner	Position	School
1999	Mike Maguire	Defenceman	Holy Cross
2000	Marc Senerchia	Goaltender	Connecticut
2001	Jeff Gould	Center	Mercyhurst
2002	Matt Craig	Center	Quinnipiac
2003	David Wrigley	Left wing	Mercyhurst

=== Winners by school ===
School	Winners
Mercyhurst	2
Connecticut	1
Holy Cross	1
Quinnipiac	1

=== Winners by position ===
Position	Winners
Center	2
Left wing	1
Defenceman	1
Goaltender	1

== See also ==
- Atlantic Hockey Most Valuable Player in Tournament
- MAAC Awards
