= American International Yellow Jackets men's ice hockey =

Team representing the American International College

- Current season
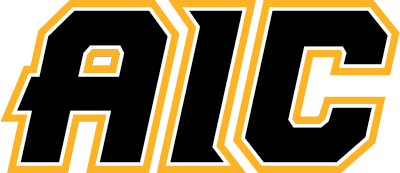
- University: American International College
- Conference: NE10
- First season: 1948–49
- Head coach: Patrick Tabb
- Assistant coaches: Scott Daniels; Lukas Radina; Kyle McGarvey
- Arena: Olympia Ice Center; Springfield, Massachusetts
- Colors: Black, white, and gold

NCAA tournament appearances
- 2019, 2021, 2022

Conference tournament champions
- ECAC 2: 1969; ECAC East: 1990; AHA: 2019, 2021, 2022

Conference regular season champions
- AHA: 2019, 2020, 2021, 2022

Current uniform

The American International Yellow Jackets men's ice hockey team is a National Collegiate Athletic Association (NCAA) college ice hockey program that represents American International College (AIC). They had previously been Division I, where they played at the MassMutual Center in Springfield, Massachusetts as members of Atlantic Hockey America. At the end of the 2024–25 season they moved to Division II.

== History ==
AIC began its varsity program in 1948, playing a modest schedule for the first dozen years, building the program under William Turner before he handed it off to Joe Bucholz. In 1961, the Yellow Jackets joined with 27 other eastern schools (mostly in New England) to form ECAC Hockey. AIC finished near the bottom for three seasons and in 1964 it was decided that the conference was too unwieldy to continue and was split into two divisions. The Yellow Jackets joined the lower division, becoming a founding member of ECAC 2.

AIC had some success when Turner returned to take over, winning the conference tournament in 1969, but dipped slightly after his retirement in 1970. When Paul Thornton took over in 1974, AIC saw a resurgence, and by the late 1970s, it had returned to the ECAC 2 Tournament, but after his departure in 1978, the program slumped once more.

In 1984, the Division II ice hockey level collapsed and sent almost all teams at that level down to Division III. AIC followed along, and when ECAC 2 split, the Yellow Jackets stayed with the eastern side, joining the new ECAC East. In all that upheaval, it was not lost that AIC had gotten its sixth head coach since 1970, but they were finally able to find someone willing to stick around in Gary Wright.

Wright's time with AIC began successfully, with the team earning its first 20-win season in his fourth year. The following season, 1989, saw the Yellow Jackets pace the ECAC East with 20 wins and set a program record with 24 wins overall. Still, they faltered in the conference tournament and failed to make the D-III National championship. The following year, they won the ECAC East title, their first conference championship in 21 years. However, they were left out of the National Tournament due to a relatively poor overall record (only eight teams made the tournament, and the league champions did not receive an automatic berth). AIC continued to play well in the mid-90s, but in 1995, the program declined sharply, dropping from 14 to 4 wins, and remained in the ECAC East cellar for the rest of its time there.

In 1998, the MAAC began sponsoring an ice hockey conference, and AIC joined as an affiliate member, returning to the top tier of college hockey. In their first year back the Yellow Jackets posted a decent record, finishing 5th in the 8-team field but bowed out in the first round of the conference playoffs. After that brief glimpse of success, however, AIC fell to the bottom of the conference and remained there for almost the next 20 years. Even with several new teams joining the conference and the division's reworking into the Atlantic Hockey Association, AIC could finish no better than 9th from 2000 through 2017, with the lone exception coming in 2006 when Atlantic Hockey had only 8 league members.

AIC lost 20 games for 13 consecutive seasons and 18 out of 19 years after 1999. Gary Wright eventually retired in 2016, being the longest-tenured coach at the time of his retirement.

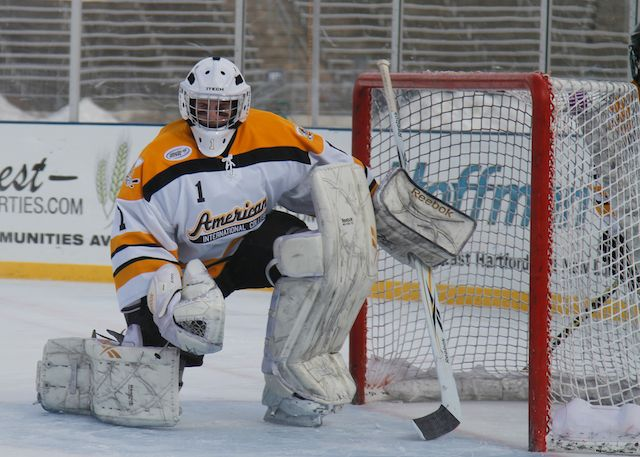
AIC playing an outdoor game at Pratt & Whitney Stadium at Rentschler Field in 2011

A new era at AIC began in 2016 with Eric Lang as the new head coach. After a poor but familiar first season, AIC posted its best record since 1993 with 15 wins, finishing 8th in Atlantic Hockey and winning its first conference tournament round in over a decade. The following year, AIC won its first-ever conference championship and, after winning its first conference tournament at the Division I level, made its first appearance in an NCAA Championship. As the lowest-seeded team, AIC played against #1 St. Cloud State and, despite being outshot 34-13 in the game, won the game 2-1. They would fall to Denver 3-0 in the next round of the tournament.

AIC again won the Atlantic Hockey championship in 2020; however, before the team played its first postseason game, the NCAA canceled all remaining contests and tournaments due to the COVID-19 pandemic.

AIC qualified for the NCAA tournament again in 2021 and 2022.

Shortly after the end of the 2023–24 season, Atlantic Hockey merged with the women-only College Hockey America to form the new Atlantic Hockey America, with all members of both predecessor conferences becoming charter members of the merged league.

In November 2024, the school announced the hockey program would be going back to Division II due to budgetary issues and enrollment, leaving Bentley as the last D2 school in the Northeast that sponsors hockey in Division I. AIC joined the Northeast-10 Conference with Post, Franklin Pierce, Assumption, Saint Anselm, Saint Michaels, and Southern New Hampshire. As part of the move, the team also forwent further use of the MassMutual Center beyond the 2024-25 season.

On April 7, 2025, former head coach Eric Lang left for RPI. After being idle during the 2025-26 season, the program resumed play in October 2026 with former Yellow Jackets player and assistant coach Patrick Tabb serving as its new head coach and home games being played at the Olympia Ice Center in West Springfield.

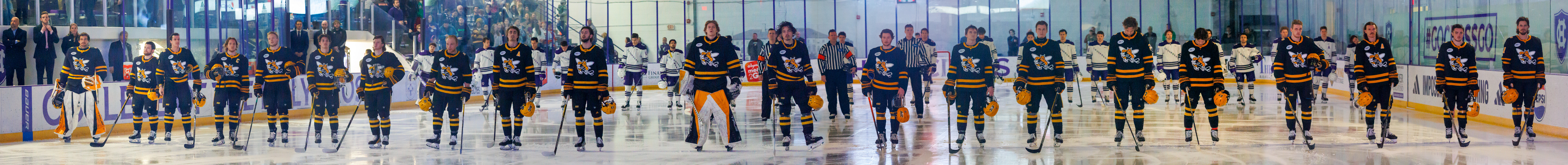
2023-2024 American International Yellow Jackets at Holy Cross's Hart Center

== Roster ==
As of October 4, 2026.

No.	Nat.	Player	Class	Pos	Height	Weight	DoB	Hometown	Previous team	NHL rights
2	(United States)	Johnny Blase	Freshman	D	6' 0" (1.83 m)	190 lb (86 kg)	2006-03-17	Westfield, Massachusetts	Connecticut Nor'Easter (EHL)	—
3	(United States)	Dylan Rovetti	Freshman	F	5' 8" (1.73 m)	170 lb (77 kg)	2005-01-29	Cromwell, Connecticut	Springfield Pics (NCDC)	—
4	(United States)	Sam Logan	Junior	D	6' 0" (1.83 m)	200 lb (91 kg)	2003-07-13	Wethersfield, Connecticut	Western New England University (CNE)	—
5	(United States)	River Sciarrotta	Freshman	D	5' 11" (1.8 m)	175 lb (79 kg)	2005-03-27	Montpelier, Vermont	Springfield Pics (NCDC)	—
6	(United States)	Josh Giguere	Freshman	D	6' 0" (1.83 m)	170 lb (77 kg)	2005-12-16	Norton, Massachusetts	Providence Capitals (EHL)	—
7	(Canada)	Wilson Dowse	Freshman	D	6' 5" (1.96 m)	217 lb (98 kg)	2005-10-21	Montréal, Quebec	West Chester Wolves (NCDC)	—
8	(United States)	Max Larkin	Freshman	F	5' 11" (1.8 m)	185 lb (84 kg)	2005-03-30	Eastford, Connecticut	Springfield Pics (NCDC)	—
9	(Canada)	Tyler Arthurs	Sophomore	F	6' 1" (1.85 m)	195 lb (88 kg)	2003-11-09	Brantford, Ontario	Hiram College (NCAA III)	—
10	(Russia)	Egor Vinokurov	Freshman	F	6' 1" (1.85 m)	185 lb (84 kg)	2007-12-25	Saint Petersburg, Russia	New Hampshire Mountain Kings (18U AAA)	—
11	(United States)	Tyler Genovese	Sophomore	F	5' 9" (1.75 m)	160 lb (73 kg)	2004-10-02	Wilbraham, Massachusetts	New England College (LEC)	—
12	(Sweden)	Isak Malmfors	Freshman	F	5' 9" (1.75 m)	170 lb (77 kg)	2005-11-05	Nacka, Sweden	Hanviken J20 (J20 Region)	—
13	(United States)	Mike Bevilacqua	Freshman	F	5' 8" (1.73 m)	170 lb (77 kg)	2005-04-27	Middleton, Massachusetts	Providence Capitals (EHL)	—
14	(Canada)	Anthony Arthurs	Sophomore	F	6' 2" (1.88 m)	190 lb (86 kg)	2003-11-09	Brantford, Ontario	Hiram College (NCAA III)	—
15	(United States)	Harrison Flaacke	Sophomore	F	6' 3" (1.91 m)	200 lb (91 kg)	2004-11-12	Tampa, Florida	Boston Jr. Rangers (NCDC)	—
16	(United States)	Nolan Mallett	Freshman	F	5' 10" (1.78 m)	185 lb (84 kg)	2005-01-03	Revere, Massachusetts	East Coast Wizards (EHL)	—
17	(United States)	Luke Haynes	Freshman	F	6' 0" (1.83 m)	195 lb (88 kg)	2005-05-24	East Longmeadow, Massachusetts	Providence Capitals (EHL)	—
18	(United States)	James Delaney	Freshman	D	6' 4" (1.93 m)	205 lb (93 kg)	2005-01-04	Palmer, Massachusetts	Springfield Pics (USPHL Premier)	—
19	(United States)	Bryce Grandbois	Junior	F	6' 6" (1.98 m)	230 lb (104 kg)	2004-11-12	Detroit, Michigan	Worcester State University (MASCAC)	—
21	(Lebanon)	Nael Touhami	Sophomore	F	5' 10" (1.78 m)	182 lb (83 kg)	2004-09-26	Bern, Switzerland	Fitchburg State University (MASCAC)	—
22	(Canada)	Alexander Roy	Freshman	F	5' 7" (1.7 m)	165 lb (75 kg)	2005-07-26	Stanstead, Quebec	New England Wolves (NCDC)	—
23	(Czech Republic)	Adam Drábek	Sophomore	D	6' 3" (1.91 m)	198 lb (90 kg)	2005-07-21	Prague, Czechia	SK Cernosice U20 (Regionalni liga junioru)	—
24	(New Zealand)	Jacob Carey	Freshman	F	6' 1" (1.85 m)	205 lb (93 kg)	2005-11-23	Christchurch, New Zealand	Springfield Pics (NCDC)	—
25	(Canada)	Ajahn Téo-Bérubé	Freshman	D	5' 8" (1.73 m)	165 lb (75 kg)	2005-04-21	Saint-Gabriel-de-Valcartier, Quebec	Bridgewater Bandits (EHL)	—
26	(Australia)	Neil Pretorius	Sophomore	D	6' 4" (1.93 m)	220 lb (100 kg)	2004-08-31	Brisbane, Australia	Brisbane Lightning (AIHL)	—
27	(Russia)	Aleksander Miagkov	Junior	F	6' 2" (1.88 m)	198 lb (90 kg)	2005-08-26	Lipetsk, Russia	MHK Lipetsk (NMHL)	—
29	(Canada)	Julian Karagiannis	Freshman	G	6' 2" (1.88 m)	170 lb (77 kg)	2005-08-17	Pincourt, Quebec	New England Wolves (NCDC)	—
33	(Canada)	Jordan Dumont	Freshman	G	6' 1" (1.85 m)	155 lb (70 kg)	2005-07-11	Entrelacs, Quebec	Bridgewater Bandits (EHL)	—
34	(Czech Republic)	Matyas Kacbunda	Freshman	G	6' 2" (1.88 m)	176 lb (80 kg)	2006-10-26	Pisek, Czechia	Nordic Hockey Academy (Austria U20 International)	—
37	(United States)	Kurt Mauser	Freshman	F	5' 11" (1.8 m)	200 lb (91 kg)	2005-11-08	Williamsville, New York	Providence Capitals (EHL)	—
38	(United States)	Jordan Blais	Sophomore	F	5' 7" (1.7 m)	180 lb (82 kg)	2004-03-03	Enfield, Connecticut	Vermont Lumberjacks (EHL)	—
44	(Finland)	Eetu Pehkonen	Sophomore	D	6' 0" (1.83 m)	194 lb (88 kg)	2005-07-06	Kempele, Finland	Fitchburg State University (MASCAC)	—
55	(Canada)	Vincent Cregheur	Freshman	F	5' 10" (1.78 m)	160 lb (73 kg)	2005-09-19	Terrebonne, Quebec	New England Wolves (NCDC)	—

== All-time coaching records ==
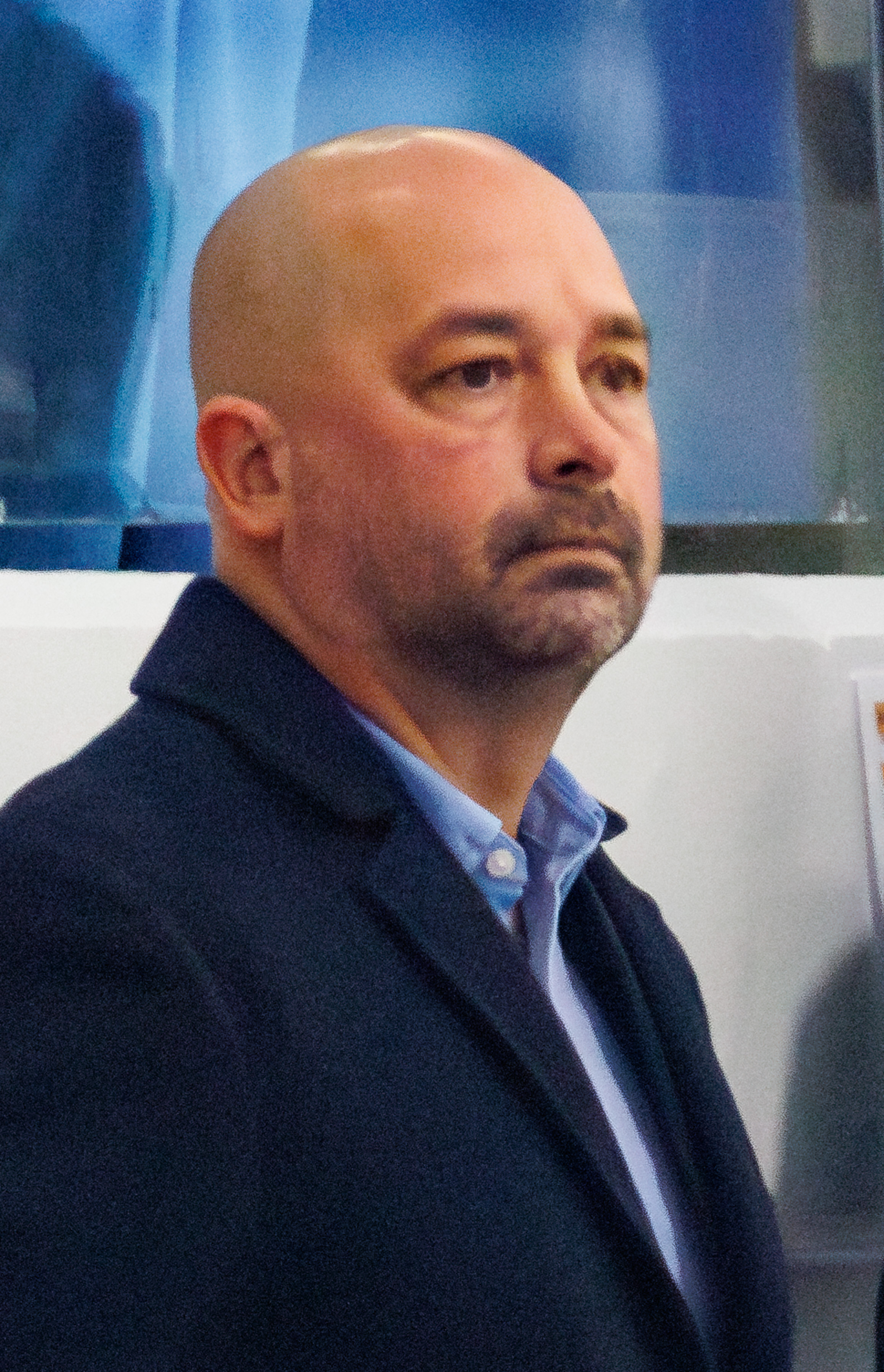
Eric Lang

As of The end of the 2024–25 season

Tenure	Coach	Years	Record	Pct.
1948–1957, 1964–1970	William Turner	15	128–118–4	.520
1957–1964	Joe Bucholz	7	39–86–0	.312
1970–1972	Wally Barlow	2	17–23–1	.427
1972–1974	Peter Esdale	2	18–32–3	.368
1974–1978	Paul Thornton	4	63–33–1	.655
1978–1982	Wayne LaChance	4	46–57–0	.447
1982–1984	Lincoln Flagg	2	18–32–0	.360
1984–2016	Gary Wright	32	313–605–76	.353
2016–2025	Eric Lang	9	155–134–30	.533
Totals	9 coaches	77 seasons	797–1124–115	.420

== Awards and honors ==
=== NCAA ===
==== Individual awards ====
Derek Hines Unsung Hero Award

- Jared Pike (2020)

==== All-Americans ====
AHCA First Team All-Americans

- 2020–21: Brennan Kapcheck, D

AHCA Second Team All-Americans

- 2018–19: Blake Christensen, F

=== MAAC ===
==== Individual awards ====
Coach of the Year

- Gary Wright: 1999

==== All–Conference ====
First Team

- 2000–01: Aaron Arnett, D

Second Team

- 1998–99: Chance Thede, G; Mike Sowa, F

Rookie Team

- 2000–01: Guillaume Caron, F; Trent Ulmer, F

=== Atlantic Hockey ===
==== Individual awards ====
Player of the Year

- Brennan Kapcheck: 2021
- Chris Theodore: 2022

Rookie of the Year

- Brennan Kapcheck: 2018

Best Defenseman

- Brennan Kapcheck: 2021
- Zak Galambos: 2022
- Brian Kramer: 2024

Best Defensive Forward

- Chris Dodero: 2021
- Jake Stella: 2022

Individual Sportsmanship Award

- Justin Cole: 2021

Regular Season Scoring Trophy

- Blake Christensen: 2019

Regular Season Goaltending Award

- Zackarias Skog: 2020
- Jake Kucharski: 2022
- Jarrett Fiske: 2023

Team Sportsmanship Award

- 2014, 2015, 2016

Coach of the Year

- Eric Lang: 2019, 2020, 2022

Most Valuable Player in Tournament

- Zackarias Skog: 2019
- Justin Cole: 2021
- Blake Bennett: 2022

==== All–Conference ====
First Team

- 2003–04: Guillaume Caron, F
- 2004–05: Frank Novello, G
- 2018–19: Brennan Kapcheck, D; Blake Christensen, F
- 2019–20: Zackarias Skog, G; Brennan Kapcheck, D; Blake Christensen, F
- 2020–21: Brennan Kapcheck, D; Tobias Fladeby, F
- 2021–22: Zak Galambos, D; Chris Theodore, F
- 2022–23: Blake Bennett, F
- 2023–24: Brian Kramer, D

Second Team

- 2012–13: Ben Meisner, G; Adam Pleskach, F
- 2019–20: Patrik Demel, D
- 2020–21: Stefano Durante, G; Elijah Barriga, F; Chris Dodero, F
- 2021–22: Jake Stella, F
- 2022–23: Jarrett Fiske, G; Brian Kramer, D

Third Team

- 2006–07: Jeremr Tendler, F
- 2007–08: Jeremr Tendler, F
- 2011–12: Adam Pleskach, F
- 2012–13: Jeff Ceccacci, D
- 2013–14: Jon Puksar, F
- 2017–18: Jānis Jaks, D
- 2019–20: Martin Mellberg, F; Hugo Reinhardt, F
- 2021–22: Jake Kucharski, G
- 2022–23: Jordan Biro, F

Rookie Team

- 2009–10: Adam Pleskach, F
- 2012–13: Chris Porter, F
- 2013–14: David Norris, F
- 2017–18: Stefano Durante, G; Brennan Kapcheck, D
- 2020–21: Nico Somerville, D; Aaron Grounds, F; Eric Otto, F
- 2021–22: Luis Lindner, D
- 2023–24: Nils Wallström, G

== Statistical leaders ==
=== Career points leaders ===
Player	Years	GP	G	A	Pts	PIM
Tom Mullen	1974–1978	86	134	114	248	
Jeff Arnold	1983–1987	106	83	119	202	
Edgar Alejandro	1972–1976	101	64	136	200	
Doug Crawford	1985–1988	84	84	103	187	
Darryl Frenette	1986–1990	119	57	125	182	
Ken Maffia	1987–1991	103	73	108	181	
Bill Condon	1973–1977	102	62	114	176	
Martin Labonte	1987–1991	112	75	89	164	
Vezio Sacratini	1987–1990	70	49	114	163	
Steve Hunter	1981–1985	104	66	97	163	

=== Career goaltending leaders ===
GP = Games played; Min = Minutes played; W = Wins; L = Losses; T = Ties; GA = Goals against; SO = Shutouts; SV% = Save percentage; GAA = Goals against average

Minimum 30 games played

Player	Years	GP	Min	W	L	T	GA	SO	SV%	GAA
Stefano Durante	2017–2021	66	3651	35	23	3	147	3	.906	2.42
Zackarias Skog	2016–2020	87	4975	37	38	9	219	9	.904	2.64
Ben Meisner	2009–2013	114	6406	30	67	12	361	12	.911	3.38
Frank Novello	2001–2005	81	4644	16	53	7	284		.911	3.67
Tom Fenton	2004–2008	84	4619	15	52	9	289	1	.885	3.75

Statistics current through the start of the 2021–22 season.

== Yellow Jackets in the NHL ==
As of July 1, 2024.

Player	Position	Team(s)	Years	Games	Stanley Cups
Dave Forbes	Left Wing	BOS, WSH	1973–1979	362	0
Kevin Wortman	Defense	CGY	1993–1994	5	0

=== WHA ===
One player was a member of the WHA.

Player	Position	Team(s)	Years	Avco Cups
Dave Forbes	Left Wing	CIN	1978–1979	0

== Olympians ==
This is a list of American International College alumni who played on an Olympic team.

Name	Position	AIC Tenure	Team	Year	Finish
Jānis Jaks	Defenseman	2016–2020	Latvia	2022, 2026	11th, 10th

== See also ==
- American International Yellow Jackets
