= Holy Cross Crusaders men's ice hockey =

- Current season
- University: College of the Holy Cross
- Conference: AHA
- Head coach: Bill Riga; 6th season, 92–90–13 (.505)
- Assistant coaches: Drew Michals; Connor Mauro; Kellen Jones
- Arena: Hart Center; Worcester, Massachusetts
- Colors: Royal purple

NCAA tournament appearances
- 2004, 2006

Conference tournament champions
- WCHL: 1967, 1968, 1969; MAAC: 1999; AHA: 2004, 2006

Conference regular season champions
- WCHL: 1967, 1968, 1969, 1970; AHA: 2004, 2006; AHA: 2025

Current uniform

The Holy Cross Crusaders men's ice hockey team is a National Collegiate Athletic Association (NCAA) Division I college ice hockey program that represents the College of the Holy Cross. The Crusaders are members of Atlantic Hockey America (AHA), formed shortly after the 2023–24 season by the merger of their former home of the Atlantic Hockey Association with the women-only College Hockey America. They play at the Hart Center in Worcester, Massachusetts.

== History ==
Holy Cross men's ice hockey began in 1966 and a year later it joined ECAC 2. The Crusaders played in the second tier of college ice hockey for ten years before they played their first playoff game, but once they made it they didn't go very far. Over a six year period Holy Cross wen 2–5 in the conference postseason and never really got close to an NCAA tournament berth. When Division II ice hockey was abandoned in 1984 Holy Cross dropped down to Division III and was placed in ECAC East when ECAC 2 split. They made the ECAC tournament three out of four years under Peter Van Buskirk but couldn't manage a win. The team went through a down period under Bill Bellerose for six seasons but started winning again when Paul Pearl became head coach in 1994. After recording their best season in fifteen years Holy Cross promoted its program to Division I and joined the MAAC in 1998–99.

In their first year of D–I play Holy Cross won its first Conference Tournament, winning the inaugural MAAC Championship. Unfortunately, because the NCAA did not offer the MAAC an automatic bid at that time the Crusaders did not make the NCAA tournament. The next season Holy Cross dropped to seventh in the conference and lost 24 games over the course of the season (a program worst). After missing out on the conference tournament the next season Holy Cross returned to the playoffs for the final two years of the MAAC's existence before joining with all former MAAC programs in founding Atlantic Hockey.

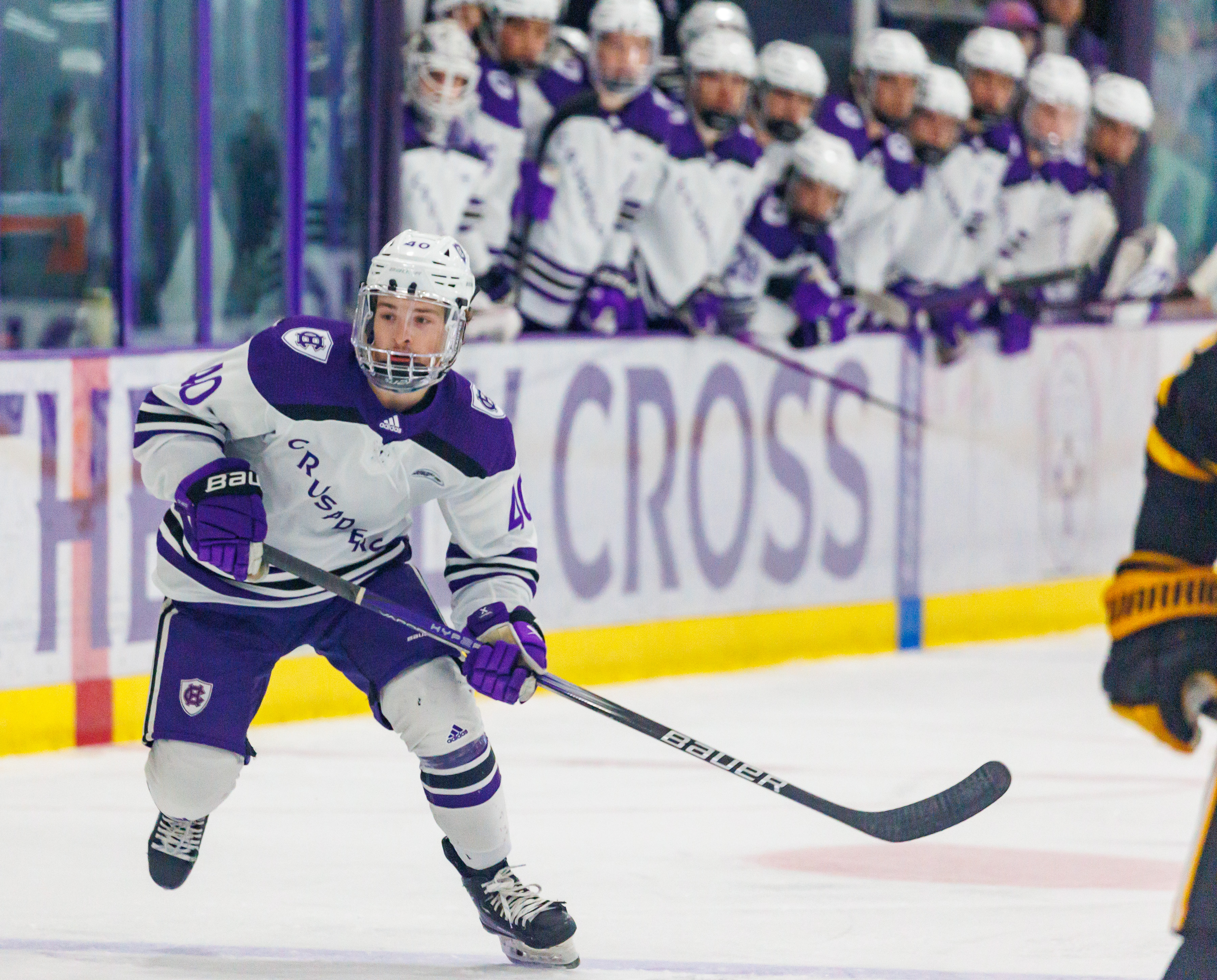
Michael Hodge in action in 2024

Similar to their start with the MAAC, Holy Cross produced a great season, winning 22 games, and were able to win their first conference title. They then swept through the Atlantic Hockey playoffs and captured their second tournament championship, though this time they received a berth into the NCAA tournament for the first time.

Though their national championship experience was brief the Crusaders continued to play well and returned to the Championship in 2006 after winning both conference crowns. The met #2 overall seeded Minnesota in the first round and pushed the heavily favored Golden Gophers into overtime where Tyler McGregor scored 53 seconds in, winning what is usually noted as the biggest upset in tournament history.

Holy Cross would decline after their miraculous 2006 season, posting losing records for four consecutive years, but the program began to recover in the second decade of the 20th century. Paul Pearl resigned in 2014 and was replaced by David Berard who saw middling regular season results.

In the 2022-2023 regular season Holy Cross won their first Atlantic Hockey playoff round since the 2006 season against American International College. They would later upset Rochester Institute of Technology in the semifinals of the tournament but lose in the championship to Canisius.

== Season-by-season results ==
Source:

== Postseason ==
=== NCAA tournament results ===
The Crusaders have appeared in the NCAA tournament two times. Their combined record is 1–2.

Year	Seed	Round	Opponent	Results
2004	#4	West Regional semifinal	#1 North Dakota	L 3-0
2006	#4	West Regional semifinal West Regional Final	#1 Minnesota #2 North Dakota	W 4-3 (OT); L 5-2

== Coaches ==
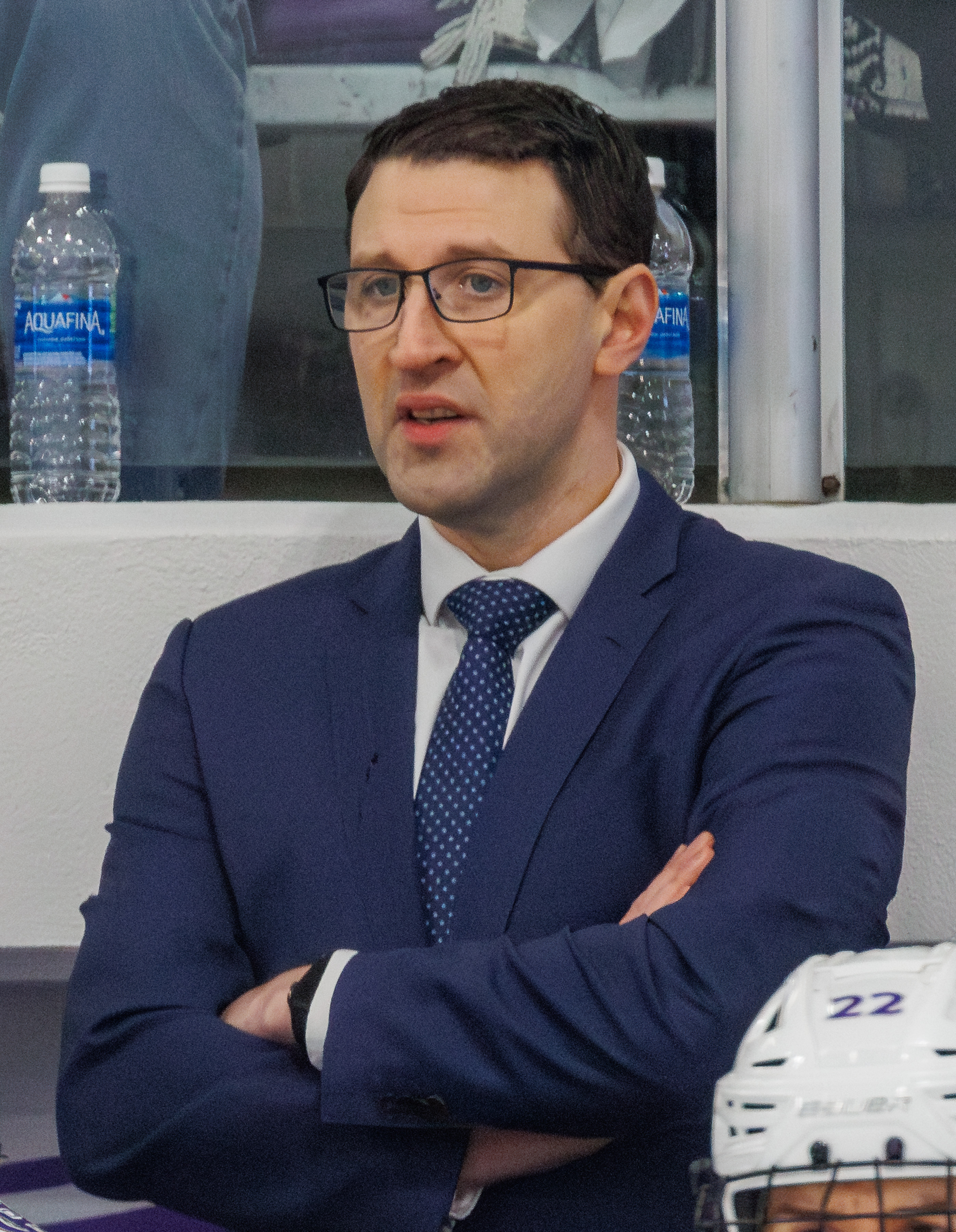
Bill Riga

As of completion of 2025–26 season

Tenure	Coach	Years	Record	Pct.
1966–1976	Bill Kane	10	122–104–2	.539
1976–1979	Mike Addesa	3	49–31–1	.611
1979–1988, 1996–1997	Peter Van Buskirk	10	167–146–8	.533
1988–1994	Bill Bellerose	6	61–99–3	.383
1994–1996, 1997–2014	Paul Pearl	19	297–293–69	.503
2014–2021	David Berard	7	84–116–34	.432
2021–Present	Bill Riga	5	92–90–13	.508
Totals	7 coaches	60 seasons	872–879–130	.498

== Awards and honors ==
=== NCAA ===
==== Individual Awards ====
Derek Hines Unsung Hero Award

- Matt Vidal: 2016

==== Division I All-Americans ====
AHCA Second Team All-Americans

- 2023–24: Liam McLinskey, F
- 2024–25: Liam McLinskey, F

=== MAAC ===
==== Individual awards ====
Offensive Player of the Year

- Patrick Rissmiller, F: 2002
- Brandon Doria, F: 2003

Goaltender of the Year

- Scott Simpson: 1999

Offensive Rookie of the Year

- Tyler McGregor, F: 2003

Coach of the Year

- Paul Pearl: 2002

Tournament Most Valuable Player

- Mike Maguire, D: 1999

==== All-Conference teams ====
First Team All-MAAC

- 1998–99: Scott Simpson, G; Chris Fattey, F
- 2001–02: Patrick Rissmiller, F
- 2002–03: Brandon Doria, F

Second Team All-MAAC

- 1998–99: Mike Maguire, D
- 1999–00: Jim Whelan, D
- 2001–02: R. J. Irving, D; Brandon Doria, F

MAAC All-Rookie Team

- 1998–99: Patrick Rissmiller, F
- 2000–01: R. J. Irving, D; Greg Kealey, F
- 2002–03: Tyler McGregor, F

=== Atlantic Hockey ===
==== Individual awards ====
Player of the Year

- Tyler McGregor: 2006
- Liam McLinskey: 2024

Best Defensive Forward

- Greg Kealey: 2004
- Blair Bartlett: 2006
- Rob Linsmayer: 2011

Best Defenseman

- Rob Godfrey: 2006
- Jon Landry: 2007

Individual Sportsmanship Award

- Tim Coskren: 2004
- Tyler McGregor: 2006
- James Sixsmith: 2007

Regular Season Goaltending Award

- Ben Conway: 2005
- Tony Quesada: 2006
- Jason Grande: 2024

Regular Season Scoring Trophy

- Tyler McGregor: 2006
- Liam McLinskey: 2024

Best Defensive Forward

- Greg Kealey, F: 2004
- James Sixsmith, LW: 2006

Most Valuable Player in Tournament

- Tyler McGregor: 2006

==== All-Conference teams ====
First Team All-Atlantic Hockey

- 2003–04: Jeff Dams, F
- 2004–05: Tyler McGregor, F
- 2005–06: Jon Landry, D; Tyler McGregor, F
- 2006–07: Jon Landry, D; James Sixsmith, F
- 2014–15: Matt Ginn, G
- 2017–18: Paul Berrafato, G
- 2023–24: Liam McLinskey, F

Second Team All-Atlantic Hockey

- 2003–04: Tony Quesada, G
- 2004–05: Pierre Napert-Frenette, F
- 2005–06: Tony Quesada, G; Pierre Napert-Frenette, F
- 2011–12: Adam Schmidt, F
- 2020–21: Matt Slick, D
- 2022–23: Jack Ricketts, F
- 2023–24: Jason Grande, G; Jack Ricketts, F

Third Team All-Atlantic Hockey

- 2007–08: Matt Burke, D; Brodie Sheahan, F
- 2016–17: Spencer Trapp, D; Danny Lopez, F
- 2021–22: Ryan Leibold, F
- 2022–23: Nick Hale, D

Atlantic Hockey All-Rookie Team

- 2003–04: James Sixsmith, F
- 2007–08: Mark Znutas, D; Everett Sheen, F
- 2010–11: Jeffrey Reppucci, F
- 2011–12: Matt Ginn, G
- 2012–13: Karl Beckman, D
- 2018–19: Matt Slick, D; Anthony Vincent, F
- 2022–23: Mack Oliphant, D
- 2023–24: Jack Stockfish, F
- 2024–25: Matt Kursonis, F

=== Atlantic Hockey America ===
==== Individual awards ====
Player of the Year

- Liam McLinskey: 2025

Forward of the Year

- Liam McLinskey: 2025

Goaltender of the Year

- Thomas Gale: 2025

Individual Sportsmanship Award

- Mack Oliphant: 2026

Coach of the Year

- Bill Riga: 2025

==== All-Conference teams ====
First Team All-Atlantic Hockey America

- 2024–25: Thomas Gale, G; Liam McLinskey, F
- 2025–26: Jack Stockfish, F

Second Team All-Atlantic Hockey America

- 2024–25: Mack Oliphant, D
- 2025–26: Mack Oliphant, D

Third Team All-Atlantic Hockey America

- 2024–25: Devin Phillips, F

Atlantic Hockey America All-Rookie Team

- 2024–25: Matt Kursonis, F

== Statistical leaders ==
=== Career points leaders ===
Player	Years	GP	G	A	Pts	PIM
Joe Lunny	1982–1986		103	116	219	
Jerry DeLeo	1982–1986		101	117	218	
Larry Murphy	1966–1970		119	88	207	
Matt Muniz	1982–1986		87	120	207	
Glenn Graves	1973–1977		75	122	197	
Gerry Curley	1977–1981		93	98	191	
Bill Butler	1966–1969		91	89	180	
Bill Bellerose	1973–1977		71	81	152	
James Sixsmith	2003–2007	142	48	104	152	
John Powell	1977–1981				147	

=== Career goaltending leaders ===
GP = Games played; Min = Minutes played; W = Wins; L = Losses; T = Ties; GA = Goals against; SO = Shutouts; SV% = Save percentage; GAA = Goals against average

Minimum 30 games

Player	Years	GP	Min	W	L	T	GA	SO	SV%	GAA
Jason Grande	2022–2024	42	2413	25	13	3	87	2	.920	2.16
Thomas Gale	2021–2025	85	4749	37	35	6	191	5	.917	2.41
Tony Quesada	2002–2006	105	6034	61	33	8	251	7	.915	2.50
Paul Berrafato	2014–2018	114	6677	46	47	19	281	11	.911	2.51
Matt Ginn	2011–2015	129	7759	59	55	13	324	8	.917	2.51
Scott Simpson	1995–1999	38	1960	21	10	2	82	2	.903	2.51

Statistics current through the end of the 2024–25 season.

== Holy Cross Varsity Club Hall of Fame ==
The following is a list of people associated with the Holy Cross men's ice hockey program who were elected into the Holy Cross Varsity Club Hall of Fame (induction date in parentheses).

- Larry Murphy (1981)
- Gerry Curley (1996)
- Jim Stewart (1998)
- Joe Lunny (1999)
- Glenn Graves (2000)
- Bill Bellerose (2002)
- Dean Casagrande (2002)
- Matt Muniz (2005)
- Patrick Rissmiller (2010)
- Tyler McGregor (2013)
- Tony Quesada (2014)
- James Sixsmith (2017)
- Terrence Butt (2018)

== Current roster ==
As of August 11, 2025.

No.	Nat.	Player	Class	Pos	Height	Weight	DoB	Hometown	Previous team	NHL rights
1	(United States)	Louden Hogg	Senior	G	5' 11" (1.8 m)	160 lb (73 kg)	2002-10-18	Cheyenne, Wyoming	Fargo Force (USHL)	—
2	(United States)	Lachlan Getz	Senior	D	6' 3" (1.91 m)	190 lb (86 kg)	2002-02-01	Northfield, Illinois	Michigan Tech (CCHA)	—
3	(Canada)	Brody Gagno	Junior	D	6' 1" (1.85 m)	190 lb (86 kg)	2002-07-29	South Surrey, British Columbia	Surrey Eagles (BCHL)	—
4	(Canada)	Anthony Biakabutuka	Freshman	D	6' 3" (1.91 m)	194 lb (88 kg)	2006-06-20	Longueuil, Quebec	Nanaimo Clippers (BCHL)	—
5	(United States)	Will Troutwine	Junior	D	6' 3" (1.91 m)	215 lb (98 kg)	2002-06-23	Eveleth, Minnesota	Janesville Jets (NAHL)	—
6	(United States)	Timothy Heinke	Senior	F	6' 1" (1.85 m)	194 lb (88 kg)	2001-10-02	Kensington, Connecticut	Quinnipiac (ECAC)	—
7	(United States)	Anthony Carone	Freshman (RS)	F	6' 1" (1.85 m)	183 lb (83 kg)	2003-07-30	Pittsburgh, Pennsylvania	Victoria Grizzlies (BCHL)	—
8	(United States)	Ryan Buckley	Sophomore	D	6' 1" (1.85 m)	179 lb (81 kg)	2004-01-06	Warwick, Rhode Island	Alberni Valley Bulldogs (BCHL)	—
10	(United States)	David Hymovitch	Junior	F	5' 11" (1.8 m)	181 lb (82 kg)	2003-08-14	Phoenix, Arizona	Arizona State (NCHC)	—
11	(Canada)	Michael Abgrall	Senior	F	5' 11" (1.8 m)	172 lb (78 kg)	2003-10-25	Richmond, British Columbia	Omaha (NCHC)	—
12	(United States)	Matt Kursonis	Sophomore	F	6' 1" (1.85 m)	187 lb (85 kg)	2004-03-05	Worcester, Massachusetts	Alberni Valley Bulldogs (BCHL)	—
13	(United States)	Will Elias	Junior	D	6' 0" (1.83 m)	180 lb (82 kg)	2003-01-28	Weston, Massachusetts	Cowichan Valley Capitals (BCHL)	—
14	(Canada)	Owain Johnston	Sophomore	D	6' 1" (1.85 m)	194 lb (88 kg)	2003-10-19	Toronto, Ontario	St. Francis Xavier (AUS)	—
15	(Canada)	Jarrod Smith	Sophomore	F	5' 10" (1.78 m)	165 lb (75 kg)	2004-01-22	West Vancouver, British Columbia	Cranbrook Bucks (BCHL)	—
17	(United States)	Matt DeBoer	Senior	F	6' 0" (1.83 m)	185 lb (84 kg)	2002-09-02	Las Vegas, Nevada	Green Bay Gamblers (USHL)	—
18	(Canada)	Ty Gagno	Junior	F	6' 2" (1.88 m)	185 lb (84 kg)	2003-10-01	Langley, British Columbia	Prince George Spruce Kings (BCHL)	—
19	(Canada)	Jack Stockfish	Junior	F	6' 4" (1.93 m)	215 lb (98 kg)	2002-09-30	North Bay, Ontario	Prince George Spruce Kings (BCHL)	—
20	(United States)	Devin Phillips	Senior	F	5' 9" (1.75 m)	170 lb (77 kg)	2001-07-12	Raleigh, North Carolina	Brooks Bandits (AJHL)	—
21	(Canada)	Owen Kim	Sophomore	F	5' 8" (1.73 m)	161 lb (73 kg)	2004-05-02	North Vancouver, British Columbia	Vernon Vipers (BCHL)	—
23	(Canada)	Ben LeFranc	Sophomore	F	5' 9" (1.75 m)	176 lb (80 kg)	2003-08-14	Penticton, British Columbia	Prince George Spruce Kings (BCHL)	—
24	(United States)	Dax Williams	Freshman	D	6' 0" (1.83 m)	201 lb (91 kg)	2005-09-28	Calgary, Alberta	Calgary Hitmen (WHL)	—
26	(United States)	Will Reardon	Freshman	F	6' 6" (1.98 m)	216 lb (98 kg)	2004-03-05	Philadelphia, Pennsylvania	Corpus Christi IceRays (NAHL)	—
27	(United States)	Mack Oliphant	Senior	D	6' 3" (1.91 m)	195 lb (88 kg)	2002-12-28	Northbrook, Illinois	Johnstown Tomahawks (NAHL)	—
28	(Canada)	Jack Seymour	Senior	F	5' 11" (1.8 m)	160 lb (73 kg)	2001-04-06	Chelsea, Quebec	Chilliwack Chiefs (BCHL)	—
29	(United States)	Conner Welsh	Junior	F	5' 11" (1.8 m)	175 lb (79 kg)	2004-01-02	Greenwich, Connecticut	Vernon Vipers (BCHL)	—
30	(Canada)	Danick Leroux	Freshman	G	6' 2" (1.88 m)	201 lb (91 kg)	2005-09-02	Candiac, Quebec	Rochester Jr. Americans (NAHL)	—
33	(Canada)	Connor MacKenzie	Junior	G	6' 0" (1.83 m)	165 lb (75 kg)	2002-05-10	Toronto, Ontario	Vermont (HEA)	—
34	(United States)	Joe Solimine	Senior	F	5' 8" (1.73 m)	165 lb (75 kg)	2002-03-03	Middleton, Massachusetts	Boston Junior Bruins (NCDC)	—
37	(United States)	Quinn McCall	Freshman	D	5' 11" (1.8 m)	181 lb (82 kg)	2005-01-12	St. John, Indiana	Erie Otters (OHL)	—
38	(United States)	Noah Eyre	Sophomore	F	5' 11" (1.8 m)	176 lb (80 kg)	2004-06-22	Vienna, Virginia	Quinnipiac (ECAC)	—

== Crusaders in the NHL ==
As of July 1, 2024.

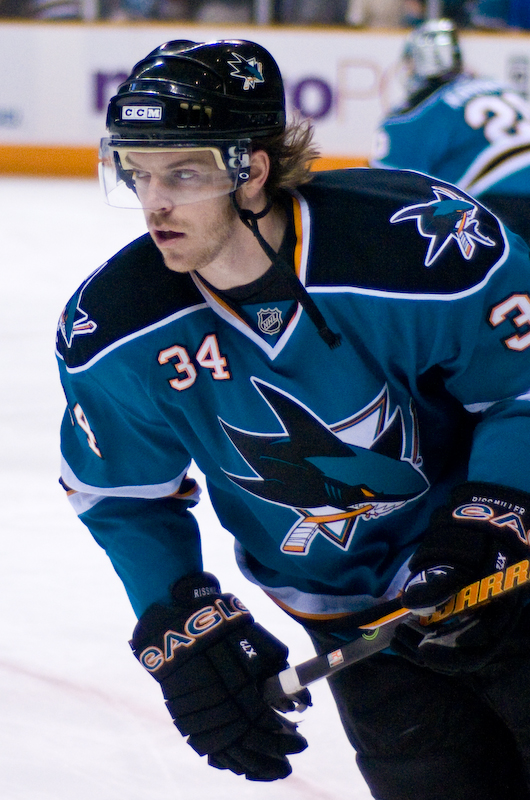
Patrick Rissmiller

Player	Position	Team(s)	Years	Games	Stanley Cups
Patrick Rissmiller	Left Wing	SJS, NYR, ATL, FLA	2003–2011	192	0
Jim Stewart	Goaltender	BOS	1979–1980	1	0
