= Richie Hansen =

American ice hockey player (born 1955)

- Born: October 30, 1955 (age 70) Northport, New York, U.S.
- Height: 5 ft 10 in (178 cm)
- Weight: 184 lb (83 kg; 13 st 2 lb)
- Position: Center
- Shot: Left
- Played for: New York Islanders; St. Louis Blues
- NHL draft: 119th overall, 1975; New York Islanders
- Playing career: 1975–1984

Richard John Hansen (born October 30, 1955) is an American former professional ice hockey player. He played 20 games in the National Hockey League with the New York Islanders and St. Louis Blues from 1977 to 1982. The rest of his career, which lasted from 1975 to 1984, was spent in the minor leagues. His son, Rich Hansen, also was a hockey player.

== Career statistics ==
=== Regular season and playoffs ===
			Regular season					Playoffs
Season	Team	League	GP	G	A	Pts	PIM	GP	G	A	Pts	PIM
1971–72	Brooklyn Stars	NYJHL	30	19	52	71	47	—	—	—	—	—
1972–73	St. Catharines Black Hawks	OHA	13	2	11	13	12	—	—	—	—	—
1972–73	Sudbury Wolves	OHA	26	11	10	21	14	—	—	—	—	—
1973–74	Sudbury Wolves	OHA	62	34	47	81	31	—	—	—	—	—
1974–75	Sudbury Wolves	OMJHL	69	26	46	72	28	—	—	—	—	—
1975–76	Erie Blades	NAHL	74	40	41	81	51	5	2	3	5	0
1976–77	New York Islanders	NHL	4	1	0	1	0	—	—	—	—	—
1976–77	Fort Worth Texans	CHL	74	30	47	77	32	6	0	3	3	4
1977–78	New York Islanders	NHL	2	0	0	0	0	—	—	—	—	—
1977–78	Fort Worth Texans	CHL	67	25	53	78	36	14	7	11	18	2
1978–79	New York Islanders	NHL	12	1	6	7	4	—	—	—	—	—
1978–79	Fort Worth Texans	CHL	20	4	8	12	4	5	1	0	1	0
1979–80	Salt Lake Golden Eagles	CHL	79	27	48	75	31	13	6	8	14	4
1980–81	Salt Lake Golden Eagles	CHL	72	27	51	78	43	17	5	18	23	19
1981–82	St. Louis Blues	NHL	2	0	2	2	0	—	—	—	—	—
1981–82	Salt Lake Golden Eagles	CHL	78	29	81	110	52	10	1	9	10	0
1982–83	Wichita Wind	CHL	70	17	43	60	12	—	—	—	—	—
1983–84	Salt Lake Golden Eagles	CHL	63	24	32	56	22	5	0	0	0	2
CHL totals			523	183	363	546	232	70	20	49	69	31
NHL totals			20	2	8	10	4	—	—	—	—	—
