= List of Sacred Heart Pioneers men's ice hockey seasons =

This is a season-by-season list of records compiled by Sacred Heart in men's ice hockey.

Sacred Heart University has yet to make an appearance in the NCAA Tournament.

== Season-by-season results ==
Note: GP = Games played, W = Wins, L = Losses, T = Ties

NCAA Champions	NCAA Frozen Four	Conference Regular Season Champions	Conference Playoff Champions

Season	Conference	Regular Season (Note: Code explanation; GP—Games Played, W—Wins, L—Losses, T—Tied games, OTW—Overtime Wins, OTL—Overtime Loses, 3/SW—Win in 3 on 3 overtime or shootout, Pts—Points*)														Conference Tournament Results	National Tournament Results
Season	Conference	Conference									Overall					Conference Tournament Results	National Tournament Results
Season	Conference	GP	W	L	T	OTW	OTL	3/SW	Pts*	Finish	GP	W	L	T	%	Conference Tournament Results	National Tournament Results
Division III
Pete Downey (1993–1994)
1993–94	ECAC South	7	2	5	0	–	–	–	.286	7th	19	4	15	0	.211		
John Glynne (1994–1996)
1994–95	ECAC South	14	6	8	0	–	–	–	12	T–4th	24	10	14	0	.417		
1995–96	ECAC South	12	7	4	1	–	–	–	15	T–3rd	24	11	11	2	.500		
Shaun Hannah (1996–2009)
1996–97	ECAC South	14	10	4	0	–	–	–	20	2nd	25	15	10	0	.600		
1997–98	ECAC South	0†	–	–	–	–	–	–	–	–	25	13	12	0	.520		
Division I
1998–99	MAAC	28	7	20	1	–	–	–	15	7th	31	7	23	1	.242	Lost Quarterfinal, 1–3 (Holy Cross)	
1999–00	MAAC	27	14	10	3	–	–	–	31	T–4th	34	16	15	3	.515	Lost Quarterfinal, 4–5 (Connecticut)	
2000–01	MAAC	26	11	10	5	–	–	–	27	T–5th	31	14	12	5	.532	Lost Quarterfinal, 2–3 (OT) (Iona)	
2001–02	MAAC	26	15	8	3	–	–	–	33	T–3rd	34	16	14	4	.529	Won Quarterfinal, 3–2 (OT) (Canisius); Lost Semifinal, 2–3 (Quinnipiac)	
2002–03	MAAC	26	13	10	3	–	–	–	29	T–3rd	35	14	15	6	.486	Lost Quarterfinal, 0–2 (Bentley)	
2003–04	Atlantic Hockey	24	12	8	4	–	–	–	28	4th	36	14	17	5	.458	Won Quarterfinal, 3–0 (Connecticut); Won Semifinal, 3–2 (Mercyhurst); Lost Championship, 0–4 (Holy Cross)	
2004–05	Atlantic Hockey	24	13	10	1	–	–	–	27	5th	35	13	21	1	.386	Lost Quarterfinal, 2–4 (Holy Cross)	
2005–06	Atlantic Hockey	28	18	8	2	–	–	–	38	3rd	35	21	12	2	.629	Lost Quarterfinal, 1–4 (Connecticut)	
2006–07	Atlantic Hockey	28	17	7	4	–	–	–	38	2nd	36	21	11	4	.639	Won Quarterfinal, 4–0 (American International); Lost Semifinal, 4–5 (OT) (Air Force)	
2007–08	Atlantic Hockey	28	14	11	3	–	–	–	31	4th	38	16	19	3	.461	Won Quarterfinal series, 2–1 (Connecticut); Lost Four vs. Five, 1–4 (Mercyhurst)	
2008–09	Atlantic Hockey	28	9	16	3	–	–	–	21	8th	38	11	23	4	.342	Won First Round, 4–2 (Connecticut); Lost Quarterfinal series, 1–2 (Air Force)	
C. J. Marottolo (2009–Present)
2009–10	Atlantic Hockey	28	16	9	3	–	–	–	35	2nd	38	21	13	4	.605	Won Quarterfinal series, 2–0 (Holy Cross); Won Semifinal, 3–2 (Air Force); Lost Championship, 1–6 (RIT)	
2010–11	Atlantic Hockey	27	5	16	6	–	–	–	16	11th	37	6	25	6	.237	Won First Round, 6–3 (Bentley); Lost Quarterfinal series, 0–2 (Air Force)	
2011–12	Atlantic Hockey	27	4	20	3	–	–	–	11	T–11th	37	6	28	3	.203	Lost First Round series, 1–2 (Bentley)	
2012–13	Atlantic Hockey	27	2	21	4	–	–	–	8	12th	36	2	30	4	.111	Lost First Round series, 0–2 (Robert Morris)	
2013–14	Atlantic Hockey	27	11	16	0	–	–	–	22	10th	36	12	24	0	.333	Lost First Round series, 0–2 (Connecticut)	
2014–15	Atlantic Hockey	28	10	12	6	–	–	–	26	8th	38	13	19	6	.421	Won First Round series, 2–0 (Army); Lost Quarterfinal series, 0–2 (Canisius)	
2015–16	Atlantic Hockey	28	10	15	3	–	–	–	23	9th	37	13	20	4	.405	Lost First Round series, 1–2 (Bentley)	
2016–17	Atlantic Hockey	28	10	15	3	–	–	–	23	9th	37	13	19	5	.419	Lost First Round series, 1–2 (Bentley)	
2017–18	Atlantic Hockey	28	9	15	4	–	–	–	22	11th	39	13	22	4	.385	Won First Round series, 0–2 (RIT); Lost Quarterfinal series, 0–2 (Mercyhurst)	
2018–19	Atlantic Hockey	28	14	11	3	–	–	–	31	4th	37	16	17	4	.486	Lost Quarterfinal series, 1–2 (RIT)	
2019–20	Atlantic Hockey	28	18	8	2	–	–	0	56	2nd	34	21	10	3	.662	Tournament Cancelled	
2020–21	Atlantic Hockey	13	6	6	1	1	2	0	.513	6th	18	6	10	2	.389	Lost Quarterfinal series, 0–2 (Army)	
2021–22	Atlantic Hockey	26	11	12	3	0	1	3	40	5th	37	15	18	4	.459	Lost Quarterfinal series, 1–2 (RIT)	
2022–23	Atlantic Hockey	26	14	9	3	2	0	2	45	3rd	37	17	17	3	.500	Lost Quarterfinal series, 1–2 (Niagara)	
2023–24	Atlantic Hockey	26	14	10	2	2	2	1	45	3rd	36	14	19	3	.431	Lost Quarterfinal series, 0–2 (Niagara)	
2024–25	AHA	26	16	7	3	1	1	2	48	2nd	39	21	13	5	.603	Won Quarterfinal series, 2–1 (Air Force); Lost Semifinal series, 0–2 (Bentley)	
2025–26	AHA	26	15	8	3	1	0	1	48	2nd	40	23	14	3	.613	Won Quarterfinal series, 2–0 (Niagara); Won Semifinal series, 2–1 (Robert Morris); Lost Championship, 2–3 (Bentley)	
Totals											GP	W	L	T	%	Championships	
Regular Season											1039	420	516	103	.454		
Conference Post-season											74	28	46	0	.378		
NCAA Post-season											0	0	0	0	–		
Regular Season and Post-season Record											1113	448	562	103	.449		

* Winning percentage is used when conference schedules are unbalanced.
† Sacred Heart was ruled ineligible for postseason play and their divisional games were not counted in conference standings as a result of the program offering athletic scholarships.
