= Rick Gotkin =

Current position
- Record: 616–576–114 (.515)

Biographical details
- Born: November 7, 1959 (age 66); Brooklyn, New York, U.S.
- Education: SUNY-Brockport

Playing career
- 1980–1982: SUNY-Brockport
- Position: Defenseman

Coaching career (HC unless noted)
- 1982–1983: SUNY-Brockport (Assistant)
- 1986–1988: Rensselaer (Assistant)
- 1988–2026: Mercyhurst

Head coaching record
- Overall: 617–578–114 (.515)
- Tournaments: 1–8 (.111)

Accomplishments and honors

Championships
- 1995 ECAC West tournament champion 2001 MAAC Champion; 2001 MAAC Tournament champion 2002 MAAC Champion; 2003 MAAC Champion; 2003 MAAC tournament champion 2005 Atlantic Hockey Tournament champion 2014 Atlantic Hockey Champion

Awards
- 2001 MAAC Coach of the Year; 2014 Atlantic Hockey Coach of the Year

Rick Gotkin (born November 7, 1959), is an American retired ice hockey head coach and player. He was the head coach of the Mercyhurst Lakers men's ice hockey from 1988 until 2026.

== Career ==
Gotkin began attending SUNY-Brockport in 1978, managing to work his way onto the varsity ice hockey team in his final two years there before graduating in 1982. He spent one additional year with the program as an assistant the following season. By 1986 he was back in the college ranks as an assistant coach for Rensselaer. After two campaigns with the Engineers he received his first head coaching opportunity at Mercyhurst.

When Gotkin arrived in Erie the college's ice hockey program was only a year old. He took over after Fred Lane led the team to a very good 16-7 mark the year before and while Gotkin's first season was disappointing at 11-16-1 he soon brought the Lakers to Division III prominence with at least 18 wins in four consecutive seasons. Mercyhurst made their first postseason appearance in his third year and their first National Championship appearance by year five (the Lakers by that time having moved up to Division II). Gotkin would lead the Lakers to their first 20-win season two years later (as well as their second championship game) but wasn't able to push them any further for the rest of their time in D-II.

A year after the MAAC ice hockey conference was formed Mercyhurst was invited to join alongside Bentley and they became a Division I program for the 1999–00 season. The Lakers started off strong, finishing with a second place finish in their inaugural year, before winning the conference tournament the following season and making their first NCAA tournament appearance. Gotkin would get the Lakers to three consecutive regular season titles from 2001 thru 2003 and a second NCAA berth in '03 but after the season the MAAC conference dissolved when founding members Iona and Fairfield dropped their programs.

Fortunately for Gotkin and the rest of the programs, the remaining universities continued to support their teams and formed a new conference, Atlantic Hockey which began play in 2003–04. Gotkin and the Lakers weren't quite as successful in the second version as they were in the MAAC but he still helped the team to several 20-win seasons, a tournament title in 2005, a regular season title in 2013–14 and notched his 500th win during the 2015–16 season. Gotkin signed a 5-year extension that will keep him with the team through the 2020 season.

== Head coaching record ==
Record table
Season	Team	Overall	Conference	Standing	Postseason
Mercyhurst Lakers (ECAC West (D-III)) (1988–1992)
1988–89	Mercyhurst	11–16–1	5–12–1		
1989–90	Mercyhurst	18–8–4	16–3–2		ECAC West Semifinals
1990–91	Mercyhurst	19–12–1	15–3–0		NCAA Quarterfinals
1991–92	Mercyhurst	19–12–0	13–8–0		ECAC West Runner-up
Mercyhurst:		67–48–6	49–26–3		
Mercyhurst Lakers (ECAC West (D-II)) (1992–1999)
1992–93	Mercyhurst	18–10–0	15–3–0		NCAA Runner-up
1993–94	Mercyhurst	12–13–0	6–4–0		ECAC West Semifinals
1994–95	Mercyhurst	23–3–2	6–1–1		NCAA Runner-up
1995–96	Mercyhurst	18–7–2	5–4–0		ECAC West Semifinals
1996–97	Mercyhurst	16–9–2	5–5–1		ECAC West Semifinals
1997–98	Mercyhurst	17–9–1	4–5–1		ECAC West Semifinals
1998–99	Mercyhurst	16–10–2	3–4–1		ECAC West Runner-up
Mercyhurst:		120–61–9	44–26–4		
Mercyhurst Lakers (MAAC) (1999–2003)
1999–00	Mercyhurst	23–10–4	19–6–2	2nd	MAAC semifinals
2000–01	Mercyhurst	22–12–2	19–6–1	1st	NCAA West Regional Quarterfinals
2001–02	Mercyhurst	24–10–3	21–2–3	1st	MAAC Runner-up
2002–03	Mercyhurst	22–13–2	19–5–2	1st	NCAA West Regional semifinals
Mercyhurst:		91–45–11	78–19–8		
Mercyhurst Lakers (Atlantic Hockey) (2003–2024)
2003–04	Mercyhurst	20–14–2	16–7–1	2nd	Atlantic Hockey Semifinals
2004–05	Mercyhurst	18–16–4	14–7–3	t-2nd	NCAA East Regional semifinals
2005–06	Mercyhurst	22–13–1	19–8–1	2nd	Atlantic Hockey Semifinals
2006–07	Mercyhurst	9–20–6	9–15–4	t-7th	Atlantic Hockey Quarterfinals
2007–08	Mercyhurst	15–19–7	11–10–7	5th	Atlantic Hockey Runner-up
2008–09	Mercyhurst	22–15–3	17–8–3	3rd	Atlantic Hockey Runner-up
2009–10	Mercyhurst	15–20–3	15–10–3	4th	Atlantic Hockey Quarterfinals
2010–11	Mercyhurst	15–18–4	12–13–2	7th	Atlantic Hockey Quarterfinals
2011–12	Mercyhurst	20–16–4	15–8–4	t-3rd	Atlantic Hockey Semifinals
2012–13	Mercyhurst	19–17–5	12–11–2	6th	Atlantic Hockey Runner-up
2013–14	Mercyhurst	21–13–7	17–4–6	1st	Atlantic Hockey Semifinals
2014–15	Mercyhurst	19–16–4	14–11–3	5th	Atlantic Hockey Runner-up
2015–16	Mercyhurst	17–15–4	15–9–4	4th	Atlantic Hockey Quarterfinals
2016–17	Mercyhurst	15–20–4	11–13–4	t-6th	Atlantic Hockey Quarterfinals
2017–18	Mercyhurst	21–12–4	16–8–4	1st	Atlantic Hockey Semifinals
2018–19	Mercyhurst	13–20–5	11–13–4	7th	Atlantic Hockey first round
2019–20	Mercyhurst	5–29–2	3–23–2	11th	Atlantic Hockey first round
2020–21	Mercyhurst	8–12–1	7–8–1	7th	Atlantic Hockey first round
2021–22	Mercyhurst	16–19–4	10–13–4	7th	Atlantic Hockey Semifinals
2022–23	Mercyhurst	10–23–3	9–14–3	8th	Atlantic Hockey Quarterfinals
2023–24	Mercyhurst	9–22–4	7–15–4	9th	Atlantic Hockey First Round
Mercyhurst:		329–369–81	260–228–67		
Mercyhurst Lakers (AHA) (2024–2026)
2024–25	Mercyhurst	4–27–4	4–19–3	11th	AHA First Round
2025–26	Mercyhurst	6–28–3	5–18–3	10th	AHA Quarterfinals
Mercyhurst:		10–55–7	9–37–6		
Total:		617–578–114 (.515)			
National champion Postseason invitational champion Conference regular season champion Conference regular season and conference tournament champion Division regular season champion Division regular season and conference tournament champion Conference tournament champion

== See also ==
- List of college men's ice hockey coaches with 400 wins

Awards and achievements
Preceded by Shaun Hannah	MAAC Coach of the Year; 2000–01	Succeeded by Paul Pearl
Preceded by Dave Burkholder; Dave Smith	Atlantic Hockey Coach of the Year; 2013–14; 2017–18	Succeeded by Derek Schooley; Eric Lang
