= Paul Pearl =

American ice hockey player and coach

Current position
- Title: Head coach
- Team: Cushing Academy

Biographical details
- Born: Winthrop, Massachusetts, U.S.
- Education: College of the Holy Cross

Playing career
- 1985–1989: Holy Cross
- Position: Defenseman

Coaching career (HC unless noted)
- 1990–1992: Portsmouth Abbey School (director)
- 1992–1994: Connecticut (assistant)
- 1994–1996: Holy Cross
- 1996–1997: Brown (assistant)
- 1997–2014: Holy Cross
- 2014–2018: Harvard (associate)
- 2018–2021: Boston University (associate)
- 2021–present: Cushing Academy

Head coaching record
- Overall: 297–293–69 (.503)
- Tournaments: 1–2 (.333)

Accomplishments and honors

Championships
- 1999 MAAC Tournament champion 2004 Atlantic Hockey Champion; 2004 Atlantic Hockey Tournament champion 2006 Atlantic Hockey Champion; 2006 Atlantic Hockey tournament champion

Awards
- 1998 New England Sports Writers Coach of the Year; 1998 ECAC East Div. II Coach of the Year; 2002 MAAC Coach of the Year; 2004 Atlantic Hockey Coach of the Year; 2011 Atlantic Hockey Coach of the Year

Paul Pearl is an American ice hockey coach and former player. He was previously the associate head coach for Boston University, having also served as head coach for Holy Cross for 19 seasons.

== Career ==
Pearl began attending Holy Cross in 1985 and played for the Division II program for four years, becoming captain of the team in his senior season. Pearl was also a four year letter winner of the Division I baseball team and captained the team his senior year. After graduating Pearl became director of the ice hockey program at Portsmouth Abbey School for two years before returning to college as an assistant at Connecticut under Bruce Marshall. In 1994 he was named as head coach for his alma mater. He became just the fifth head hockey coach for the Crusaders and would go on to lead his teams to 9 of the 11 most successful seasons in their history.

Holy Cross became a founding member of the MAAC ice hockey conference in 1998 and Pearl helped the team celebrate by winning a then-team record 22 wins capped off by capturing the inaugural conference tournament. Unfortunately the MAAC did not possess an automatic bid for the NCAA tournament and Holy Cross was not invited despite its achievement. As they had done before Holy Cross won the premier conference tournament for the successor Atlantic Hockey conference but this time were invited to the 2004 tournament. While Pearl's team was blanked by North Dakota their second berth two years later provided what is widely considered the biggest upset in college hockey history when the 15th seed Crusaders downed the second ranked Minnesota Golden Gophers 4-3 in overtime.

In addition to hockey, Pearl was also the head coach of the Holy Cross Crusaders baseball team from 1999 to 2001. He coached the first two teams to ever make the post season tournament and was twice named Patriot League coach of the year.

In 2014 Pearl resigned as head coach and took a position as the associate head coach with Harvard. In 2021, Pearl was named the Head Coach at Cushing Academy, a preparatory school in Ashburnham, Massachusetts.

== Head coaching record ==
Record table
Season	Team	Overall	Conference	Standing	Postseason
Holy Cross Crusaders (ECAC East (D-II)) (1994–1996)
1994–95	Holy Cross	15–10–0			
1995–96	Holy Cross	13–11–2			
Holy Cross:		28–21–2			
Holy Cross Crusaders (ECAC East) (1997–1998)
1997–98	Holy Cross	16–8–2			
Holy Cross:		16–8–2			
Holy Cross Crusaders (MAAC) (1998–2003)
1998–99	Holy Cross	22–9–4	19–6–3	2nd	MAAC Champion
1999–00	Holy Cross	8–24–3	8–16–3	7th	MAAC quarterfinals
2000–01	Holy Cross	8–22–2	8–16–2	10th	
2001–02	Holy Cross	17–12–5	14–7–5	t-3rd	MAAC quarterfinals
2002–03	Holy Cross	17–18–1	14–11–1	t-3rd	MAAC semifinals
Holy Cross:		72–85–15	63–56–14		
Holy Cross Crusaders (Atlantic Hockey) (2003–2014)
2003–04	Holy Cross	22–10–4	17–4–3	1st	NCAA West Regional semifinals
2004–05	Holy Cross	16–14–6	12–7–5	4th	Atlantic Hockey Semifinals
2005–06	Holy Cross	27–10–2	19–7–2	1st	NCAA West Regional final
2006–07	Holy Cross	10–20–5	9–14–5	6th	Atlantic Hockey Quarterfinals
2007–08	Holy Cross	10–19–7	9–15–4	9th	Atlantic Hockey Quarterfinals
2008–09	Holy Cross	13–20–5	10–15–3	7th	Atlantic Hockey Quarterfinals
2009–10	Holy Cross	12–19–6	10–13–5	7th	Atlantic Hockey Quarterfinals
2010–11	Holy Cross	17–16–5	14–8–5	3rd	Atlantic Hockey Semifinals
2011–12	Holy Cross	20–15–4	15–8–4	t-3rd	Atlantic Hockey Quarterfinals
2012–13	Holy Cross	20–14–3	15–9–3	3rd	Atlantic Hockey Quarterfinals
2013–14	Holy Cross	14–22–3	11–13–3	t-7th	Atlantic Hockey Quarterfinals
Holy Cross:		181–179–50	141–113–42		
Total:		297–293–69			
National champion Postseason invitational champion Conference regular season champion Conference regular season and conference tournament champion Division regular season champion Division regular season and conference tournament champion Conference tournament champion

Awards and achievements
Preceded by Rick Gotkin	MAAC Coach of the Year; 2001–02	Succeeded by Ryan Soderquist
Preceded by Inaugural; C. J. Marottolo	Atlantic Hockey Coach of the Year; 2003–04; 2010–11	Succeeded by Rand Pecknold; Ryan Soderquist
