= Gary Wright (ice hockey) =

American ice hockey coach

Biographical details
- Born: Burlington, VT, USA

Playing career
- 1973–1976: Vermont
- Position: Center

Coaching career (HC unless noted)
- 1976–1979: Rice Memorial HS
- 1979–1984: Maine (assistant)
- 1984–2016: American International

Head coaching record
- Overall: 313–605–76 (.353)

Accomplishments and honors

Records
- Most Losses, One School: (605)

Gary Wright is an American retired ice hockey coach. Wright served as head coach of Rice Memorial High School from 1976 to 1979, an assistant coach at Maine from 1979 to 1984, and as the head coach of American International from 1984 through 2016. After the retirement of Jack Parker in 2012–13 Wright became the longest-tenured coach in the NCAA along with Red Berenson.

== Career ==
Gary Wright got his start in college hockey at Vermont after graduating from Proctor Academy in 1972. After his sophomore season the Catamounts made the move to Division I, giving Wright two valuable years of playing experience at the top level under Jim Cross. Wright's playing career ended upon his graduation in 1976 and he quickly moved into the coaching ranks, becoming the head coach for Rice Memorial in his hometown of Burlington. Wright got the team to a second-place finish in his second season but after the third he left to become an assistant for Maine.

At the time of his arrival, Maine had just jumped up to the D-I ranks, joining ECAC Hockey in 1979–80. The Black Bears managed just one winning season over the next five years under Jack Semler as they grew accustomed to the stiffer competition but, as Semler was being replaced by Shawn Walsh after 1983–84, Wright got the opportunity to become the head coach at American International. Wright took over in AIC's final season as a Division II as the level was dissolving, forcing the Yellow Jackets to drop down to Division III the following year. The program joined ECAC East that same year and began to build a respectable reputation that would carry them into the mid-1990s. Despite a sharp decline after 1994, AIC was willing to sign on to the NCAA-mandated Metro Atlantic Athletic Conference as an associate member in 1998–99.

After a good first season in the MAAC, AIC remained at or near the bottom for the remainder of their time in the conference. When Atlantic Hockey formed in 2003–04 to take over from the discontinued MAAC the Yellow Jackets accompanied all of the former members into the new conference. The chance in name brought little difference in outcome for Wright's team. The Yellow Jackets were one of the worst programs in terms of wins in their conference and all of college hockey after joining the Division I ranks. Despite the lack of on-ice success, Wright was lauded for achieving a perfect Academic Progress Rate with his players and coaching AIC to three Team Sportsmanship Awards.

Wright coached AIC from 1984 to 2016. Although his 605 losses are an NCAA record for a coach at one school, Wright was respected at the university for keeping the program alive as it played much larger and better-funded Division I teams.

== Head coaching record ==
Record table
Season	Team	Overall	Conference	Standing	Postseason
American International Yellow Jackets (ECAC 2) (1984–1985)
1984–85	American International	16–15–0			
American International:		16–15–0			
American International Yellow Jackets (ECAC East) (1985–1998)
1985–86	American International	11–19–1	7–15–0		
1986–87	American International	9–19–2	5–18–2		
1987–88	American International	21–10–0	16–8–0		
1988–89	American International	24–7–0	20–3–0		
1989–90	American International	18–9–3	15–6–1		
1990–91	American International	16–11–2	12–9–2		
1991–92	American International	11–13–2	9–11–2		
1992–93	American International	16–8–3	13–7–3		
1993–94	American International	14–12–0	10–7–0		
1994–95	American International	4–19–2	2–13–2		
1995–96	American International	7–15–2	6–12–1		
1996–97	American International	5–18–2	4–13–2		
1997–98	American International	5–18–1	3–15–1		
American International:		161–178–20	122–137–16		
American International Yellow Jackets (MAAC) (1998–2003)
1998–99	American International	12–16–4	11–13–4	5th	MAAC Quarterfinals
1999–00	American International	7–20–3	5–19–3	9th	
2000–01	American International	10–20–1	10–15–1	9th	
2001–02	American International	7–21–0	6–20–0	9th	
2002–03	American International	10–20–2	9–16–1	9th	
American International:		46–97–10	41–83–9		
American International Yellow Jackets (Atlantic Hockey) (2003–2016)
2003–04	American International	5–25–4	3–17–4	9th	Atlantic Hockey Quarterfinals
2004–05	American International	4–23–4	4–16–4	9th	Atlantic Hockey Play-In
2005–06	American International	6–21–5	6–17–5	8th	Atlantic Hockey Quarterfinals
2006–07	American International	8–25–1	7–20–1	10th	Atlantic Hockey Quarterfinals
2007–08	American International	8–23–5	8–17–3	10th	Atlantic Hockey First Round
2008–09	American International	5–28–2	5–22–1	10th	Atlantic Hockey First Round
2009–10	American International	5–24–4	5–19–4	10th	Atlantic Hockey First Round
2010–11	American International	8–24–1	7–19–1	12th	Atlantic Hockey Quarterfinals
2011–12	American International	8–26–3	6–18–3	10th	Atlantic Hockey First Round
2012–13	American International	12–17–6	9–12–6	9th	Atlantic Hockey First Round
2013–14	American International	10–25–1	9–17–1	11th	Atlantic Hockey First Round
2014–15	American International	4–25–7	4–17–7	10th	Atlantic Hockey First Round
2015–16	American International	7–29–3	6–19–3	10th	Atlantic Hockey First Round
American International:		90–315–46	79–230–43		
Total:		313–605–76			
National champion Postseason invitational champion Conference regular season champion Conference regular season and conference tournament champion Division regular season champion Division regular season and conference tournament champion Conference tournament champion
