= Bruce Marshall (ice hockey) =

American ice hockey coach (1962–2016)

Biographical details
- Born: July 23, 1962; West Boylston, Massachusetts, U.S.
- Died: October 15, 2016 (aged 54); Gardner, Massachusetts, U.S.

Coaching career (HC unless noted)
- 1988–2012: Connecticut
- 2015–2016: Franklin Pierce

Head coaching record
- Overall: 332–377–69 (.471)

Accomplishments and honors

Championships
- 2000 MAAC Tournament Champion

Awards
- 1992 Edward Jeremiah Award; 1992 ECAC East Coach of the Year

Bruce Turner Marshall (July 23, 1962 – October 15, 2016) was an American ice hockey coach who was – at his death – the head coach at Franklin Pierce University. He was previously the head coach of the Connecticut Huskies ice hockey team. Marshall took over for Ben Kirtland prior to the start of the 1988–1989 season. In his 24 years as the coach since then, he has transitioned them to Division I status. Just ten years later, in 1998–1999, the Huskies began Division I play. In their first year at the highest level, Connecticut went 20–10–4. The next year was successful as well, for a new program, with a 19–16–1 record overall. However, that success was short lived, as Marshall and the Huskies have finished with a losing record every year since, consistently rating near the very bottom of the RPI ratings. Marshall's 2010–11 season was his best in recent history, however, when he did manage to reach the 2011 AHA semifinals in Rochester.

On January 7, 2013, Marshall resigned as head coach for health reasons. He had been on a medical leave of absence since November 6, 2012. Assistant coach David Berard was named head coach for the remainder of the 2012–13 season. Following a nationwide search, Mike Cavanaugh was named as Marshall's replacement after serving 18 years as an assistant at Boston College He died on October 15, 2016, at the age of 54.

== Head coaching record ==
Record table
Season	Team	Overall	Conference	Standing	Postseason
Connecticut Huskies (ECAC East) (1988–1999)
1988–89	Connecticut	6–21–0	5–15–0	14th	
1989–90	Connecticut	15–11–1	11–8–1	5th	ECAC East Quarterfinals
1990–91	Connecticut	18–7–2	12–5–2	5th	ECAC East Quarterfinals
1991–92	Connecticut	22–4–2	19–3–1	1st	ECAC East Runner-Up
1992–93	Connecticut	19–6–2	15–5–1	3rd	ECAC East Semifinals
1993–94	Connecticut	15–8–3	11–3–3	T–4th	ECAC East Semifinals
1994–95	Connecticut	15–7–5	10–2–5	T–2nd	ECAC East Semifinals
1995–96	Connecticut	16–9–1	10–8–1	T–8th	ECAC East Quarterfinals
1996–97	Connecticut	11–12–2	8–9–2	T–11th	
1997–98	Connecticut	13–13–1	10–8–1	9th	ECAC East Quarterfinals
Connecticut:		150–98–19			
Connecticut Huskies (MAAC) (1998–2003)
1998–99	Connecticut	20–10–4	18–6–4	3rd	MAAC Semifinals
1999–00	Connecticut	19–16–1	15–11–1	4th	MAAC Champion
2000–01	Connecticut	12–19–4	12–11–3	t-5th	MAAC Quarterfinals
2001–02	Connecticut	13–16–7	11–10–5	6th	MAAC Semifinals
2002–03	Connecticut	8–23–3	7–16–3	10th	
Connecticut:		72–84–19	63–54–16		
Connecticut Huskies (Atlantic Hockey) (2003–2012)
2003–04	Connecticut	12–16–7	9–10–5	5th	Atlantic Hockey Quarterfinals
2004–05	Connecticut	11–23–3	10–12–2	6th	Atlantic Hockey Quarterfinals
2005–06	Connecticut	11–23–2	9–18–1	6th	Atlantic Hockey Semifinals
2006–07	Connecticut	16–18–2	15–11–2	4th	Atlantic Hockey Semifinals
2007–08	Connecticut	13–21–3	11–14–3	t-6th	Atlantic Hockey Quarterfinals
2008–09	Connecticut	9–26–2	8–18–2	9th	Atlantic Hockey First Round
2009–10	Connecticut	7–27–3	6–19–3	9th	Atlantic Hockey Quarterfinals
2010–11	Connecticut	15–18–4	13–12–2	6th	Atlantic Hockey Semifinals
2011–12	Connecticut	16–19–4	12–12–3	8th	Atlantic Hockey Quarterfinals
2012–13	Connecticut	0–4–1†	0–0–0†	–	–
Connecticut:		110–195–31	93–129–23		
Total:		332–377–69			
National champion Postseason invitational champion Conference regular season champion Conference regular season and conference tournament champion Division regular season champion Division regular season and conference tournament champion Conference tournament champion

† Marshall stepped down on November 6, 2012

Awards and achievements
Preceded by Glenn Thomaris	Edward Jeremiah Award; 1991–92	Succeeded by Joe Baldarotta
