= Ryan Soderquist =

American ice hockey coach

Biographical details
- Born: December 30, 1976 (age 49); Stoneham, Massachusetts

Playing career
- 1995–1996: Winchendon Prep
- 1996–2000: Bentley
- Position: Center

Coaching career (HC unless noted)
- 2001–2002: Bentley (assistant)
- 2002–2023: Bentley

Head coaching record
- Overall: 277–377–85 (.432)

Accomplishments and honors

Awards
- 2009 Atlantic Hockey Coach of the Year; 2012 Atlantic Hockey Coach of the Year

Ryan Soderquist (born December 30, 1976) is an American former ice hockey coach. He coached at Bentley University from 2001–23 and was the program's longest tenured head coach.

== Career ==
Soderquist arrived at Bentley in the fall of 1996 and got off to a fast start, leading the team in scoring as a freshman. His sophomore season was even more impressive as he set team records for both goals (33) and points (59) in one season that still stand (as of 2014). in 1998–99 Bentley began to make a move to become a Division I program, playing a stronger collection of opponents over the course of the season, and it was reflected in Soderquist's decrease in scoring, posting less than half of the previous year's totals, but when the Falcons became an official member of the MAAC the following year he rebounded, netting 48 points and finishing his career as the all-time leader in goals (84) and points (173).

After graduating in 2000 Soderquist spent a year away from his alma mater before returning as an assistant coach in 2001–02. With the team struggling for wins at the D-I level, Jim McAdam stepped down in favor of Soderquist, allowing the 25-year-old to become one of the youngest head coaches in NCAA history. The team responded by winning 15 games in his first season, more than three times the number they had won the year prior. Over 12 year as head coach Soderquist has slowly been building Bentley into a good team, pushing the team to three .500 seasons and received two Coach of the Year awards for his efforts.

Soderquist announced his resignation in April 2023.

== Career statistics ==
Source
			Regular season					Playoffs
Season	Team	League	GP	G	A	Pts	PIM	GP	G	A	Pts	PIM
1996–97	Bentley	ECAC North/South/Central	26	17	24	41	16	—	—	—	—	—
1997–98	Bentley	ECAC North/South/Central	25	33	26	59	16	—	—	—	—	—
1998–99	Bentley	NCAA	20	15	10	25	36	—	—	—	—	—
1999–00	Bentley	MAAC	28	19	29	48	31	—	—	—	—	—
NCAA totals			99	84	89	173	99	—	—	—	—	—

== Head coaching record ==
Record table
Season	Team	Overall	Conference	Standing	Postseason
Bentley Falcons (MAAC) (2002–2003)
2002–03	Bentley	15–19–0	13–13–0	5th	MAAC Semifinals
Bentley:		15–19–0	13–13–0		
Bentley Falcons (Atlantic Hockey) (2003–2023)
2003–04	Bentley	9–19–4	7–13–4	7th	Atlantic Hockey Quarterfinals
2004–05	Bentley	8–20–6	6–13–5	7th	Atlantic Hockey Semifinals
2005–06	Bentley	15–17–5	11–12–5	4th	Atlantic Hockey Runner-Up
2006–07	Bentley	12–22–1	11–7–0	t-7th	Atlantic Hockey Quarterfinals
2007–08	Bentley	9–21–6	9–13–6	8th	Atlantic Hockey Quarterfinals
2008–09	Bentley	19–17–2	15–11–2	4th	Atlantic Hockey Semifinals
2009–10	Bentley	12–19–4	10–15–3	8th	Atlantic Hockey First Round
2010–11	Bentley	10–18–6	9–13–5	10th	Atlantic Hockey First Round
2011–12	Bentley	16–16–8	13–7–7	6th	Atlantic Hockey Quarterfinals
2012–13	Bentley	12–20–3	10–14–3	10th	Atlantic Hockey First Round
2013–14	Bentley	19–14–4	16–7–4	2nd	Atlantic Hockey Quarterfinals
2014–15	Bentley	17–15–5	14–9–5	t-3rd	Atlantic Hockey Quarterfinals
2015–16	Bentley	14–20–6	9–13–6	8th	Atlantic Hockey Quarterfinals
2016–17	Bentley	13–19–7	10–12–6	t-6th	Atlantic Hockey Quarterfinals
2017–18	Bentley	13–18–6	9–14–5	t-9th	Atlantic Hockey First Round
2018–19	Bentley	17–15–5	15–9–4	2nd	Atlantic Hockey Quarterfinals
2019–20	Bentley	17–16–3	13–13–2–0	T–6th	Tournament Cancelled
2020–21	Bentley	5–11–0	4–11–0	8th	Atlantic Hockey Quarterfinals (withdrew)
2021–22	Bentley	14–20–2	10–14–2	T–8th	Atlantic Hockey Quarterfinals
2022–23	Bentley	11–21–2	8–16–2	9th	Atlantic Hockey Quarterfinals
Bentley:		262–358–85	209–236–76		
Total:		277–377–85			
National champion Postseason invitational champion Conference regular season champion Conference regular season and conference tournament champion Division regular season champion Division regular season and conference tournament champion Conference tournament champion

== Awards and honors ==
Award	Year
All-MAAC First Team	1999–00

Awards and achievements
Preceded by Brian Riley; C. J. Marottolo	Atlantic Hockey Coach of the Year; 2008–09; 2011–12	Succeeded by Paul Pearl; Dave Burkholder
