= Bentley Falcons men's ice hockey statistical leaders =

The Bentley Falcons men's ice hockey statistical leaders are individual statistical leaders of the Bentley Falcons men's ice hockey program in various categories, including goals, assists, points, and saves. Within those areas, the lists identify single-game, single-season, and career leaders. The Falcons represent Bentley University in the NCAA's Atlantic Hockey America.

Bentley began competing in intercollegiate ice hockey in 1977. These lists are updated through the end of the 2024–25 season.

== Goals ==
Career
Rk	Player	Goals	Seasons
1	Ryan Soderquist	84	1996–97 1997–98 1998–99 1999–00
2	Brett Gensler	73	2010–11 2011–12 2012–13 2013–14
3	Andrew Gladiuk	72	2012–13 2013–14 2014–15 2015–16
4	Max French	67	2013–14 2014–15 2015–16 2016–17
5	Joe Maguire	65	1977–78 1978–79 1979–80 1980–81
6	Richard Starck	63	1993–94 1994–95 1995–96
7	Jeff Gumaer	62	2005–06 2006–07 2007–08 2008–09
8	Dain Prewitt	60	2005–06 2006–07 2007–08 2008–09
9	John Maguire	58	1980–81 1981–82 1982–83 1983–84
10	Kyle Schmidt	57	2014–15 2015–16 2016–17 2017–18

Season
Rk	Player	Goals	Season
1	Ryan Soderquist	33	1997–98
2	Richard Starck	28	1995–96
3	Jon Vedder	26	1988–89
4	Alex Grieve	25	2013–14
5	Brett Gensler	23	2011–12
	Max French	23	2015–16
7	Richard Starck	22	1993–94
	Andrew Gladiuk	22	2013–14
9	Brian Gangemi	21	1997–98
	Brian Gangemi	21	1998–99
	Dain Prewitt	21	2008–09
	Brett Gensler	21	2013–14

Single Game
Rk	Player	Goals	Season	Opponent
1	Richard Starck	7	1995–96	Assumption

== Assists ==
Career
Rk	Player	Assists	Seasons
1	Brett Gensler	94	2010–11 2011–12 2012–13 2013–14
2	John Maguire	91	1980–81 1981–82 1982–83 1983–84
3	Steve Weinstein	90	2011–12 2012–13 2013–14 2014–15
4	Gary See	89	1979–80 1980–81 1981–82 1982–83
	Ryan Soderquist	89	1996–97 1997–98 1998–99 1999–00
6	Steve Tobio	85	1998–99 1999–00 2000–01 2001–02
7	Anthony Canzoneri	84	2005–06 2006–07 2007–08 2008–09
8	Max French	76	2013–14 2014–15 2015–16 2016–17
9	Shawn Smith	74	1995–96 1996–97 1997–98 1998–99
10	Alex Grieve	73	2011–12 2012–13 2013–14 2014–15

Season
Rk	Player	Assists	Season
1	Steve Weinstein	37	2013–14
2	Brett Gensler	32	2013–14
3	Shawn Smith	31	1998–99
4	David Pasquale	30	1993–94
5	Chip Jessopp	29	1995–96
	Ryan Soderquist	29	1999–00
	Kyle Schmidt	29	2015–16
8	Gary See	28	1981–82
	Andrew Gladiuk	28	2015–16
10	Bob Fernberg	27	1979–80
	John Maguire	27	1981–82
	Anthony Canzoneri	27	2008–09
	Brett Gensler	27	2011–12

== Points ==
Career
Rk	Player	Points	Seasons
1	Ryan Soderquist	173	1996–97 1997–98 1998–99 1999–00
2	Brett Gensler	167	2010–11 2011–12 2012–13 2013–14
3	Andrew Gladiuk	153	2012–13 2013–14 2014–15 2015–16
4	John Maguire	149	1980–81 1981–82 1982–83 1983–84
5	Max French	143	2013–14 2014–15 2015–16 2016–17
6	Gary See	141	1979–80 1980–81 1981–82 1982–83
7	Alex Grieve	128	2011–12 2012–13 2013–14 2014–15
8	Dain Prewitt	126	2005–06 2006–07 2007–08 2008–09
	Shawn Smith	126	1995–96 1996–97 1997–98 1998–99
10	Brian Gangemi	121	1997–98 1998–99 1999–00
	Joe Maguire	121	1977–78 1978–79 1979–80 1980–81

Season
Rk	Player	Points	Season
1	Ryan Soderquist	59	1997–98
2	Brett Gensler	53	2013–14
3	Brett Gensler	50	2011–12
4	Jon Vedder	49	1988–89
5	Gary See	48	1981–82
	Ryan Soderquist	48	1999–00
7	Richard Starck	47	1995–96
	Alex Grieve	47	2013–14
	Max French	47	2015–16
10	Brian Gangemi	45	1998–99
	Andrew Gladiuk	45	2015–16
	Kyle Schmidt	45	2015–16

Single Game
Rk	Player	Points	Season	Opponent
1	John Maguire	8	1981–82	Southeastern Mass

== Saves ==
Career
Rk	Player	Saves	Seasons
1	Branden Komm	3356	2010–11 2011–12 2012–13 2013–14
2	Simon St. Pierre	3256	2001–02 2002–03 2003–04 2004–05
3	Aidan Pelino	2403	2016–17 2017–18 2018–19 2019–20
4	Jayson Argue	2216	2014–15 2015–16 2016–17 2017–18
5	Joe Calvi	2180	2007–08 2008–09 2009–10 2010–11
6	Joe Cullen	2086	1996–97 1997–98 1998–99 1999–00
7	Barratt Davison	1977	1980–81 1981–82 1982–83 1983–84
8	Connor Hasley	1851	2022–23 2023–24 2024–25
9	Kyle Rank	1692	2008–09 2009–10 2010–11 2011–12
10	Sean McEvoy	1640	1984–85 1985–86 1986–87 1987–88

Season
Rk	Player	Saves	Season
1	Branden Komm	1080	2011–12
2	Branden Komm	1079	2013–14
3	Branden Komm	1052	2012–13
4	Joe Calvi	936	2007–08
5	Ray Jean	900	2005–06
6	Simon St. Pierre	882	2002–03
7	Aidan Pelino	874	2018–19
8	Connor Hasley	859	2024–25
9	Simon St. Pierre	835	2001–02
10	Simon St. Pierre	831	2004–05

Single Game
Rk	Player	Saves	Season	Opponent
1	Ray DeVincent	73	1998–99	RIT
