= Atlantic Hockey tournament =

Atlantic Hockey tournament (defunct)
- Conference hockey championship
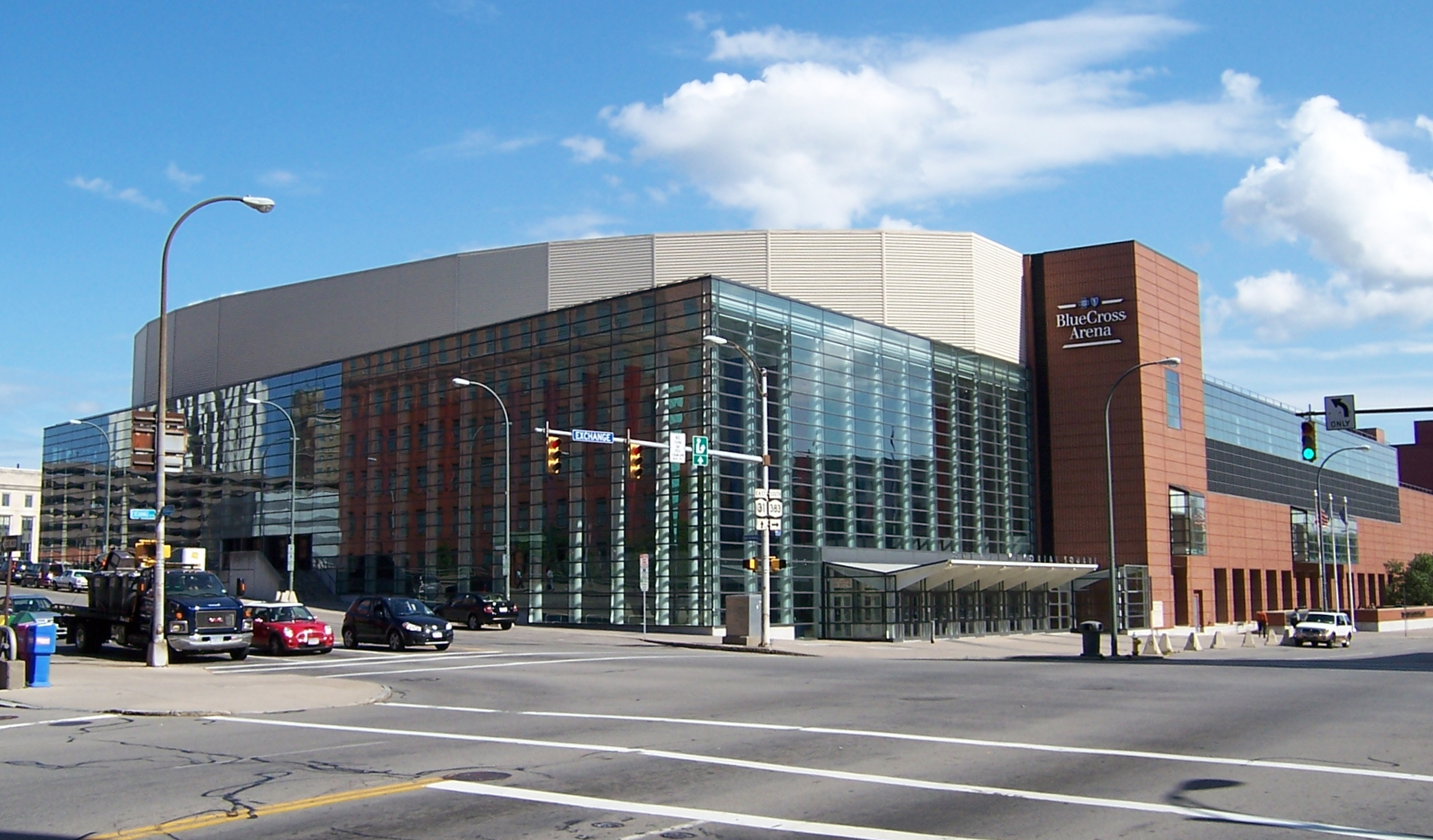
- Blue Cross Arena in Rochester, New York hosted the championship game as a neutral site for twelve seasons, the most instances hosting of any arena.
- Sport: Ice hockey
- Conference: Atlantic Hockey Association
- Format: Single-elimination / best two-of-three tournament
- Played: 2004–2024
- Last contest: 2024 Atlantic Hockey Tournament
- Current champion: RIT (fourth title)
- Most championships: Air Force (seven titles)
- Winner trophy: Riley Trophy
- TV partner: FloHockey
- Official website: Atlantic Hockey Online

The Atlantic Hockey tournament was the conference tournament for the Atlantic Hockey Association. The winner of the tournament received an automatic berth into the NCAA Division I men's ice hockey tournament. The Atlantic Hockey tournament was discontinued after the 2024 edition, following the merger of the CHA and AHA. The tournament is succeeded by the Atlantic Hockey America men's tournament.

== History ==
The tournament was first held in 2004—the first year of conference play—following the MAAC ending their hockey sponsorship. The Atlantic Hockey tournament was preceded by the MAAC ice hockey tournament. The final four games were held at Tate Rink in West Point, New York in 2004. The tournament championship moved to the Northford Ice Pavilion in Northford, Connecticut for 2005, then to the Hart Center in Worcester, Massachusetts for 2006. Starting with the 2007 tournament, the final four was moved to a neutral site, the Blue Cross Arena in Rochester, New York, the home of the AHL's Rochester Americans. From 2023–24, all tournament games were moved to campus sites, hosted by the higher seeds of each matchup.

Beginning in the 2024–25 season, the Atlantic Hockey Association officially merged with College Hockey America to form Atlantic Hockey America. While the Atlantic Hockey tournament is no longer held, it is succeeded by the Atlantic Hockey America men's tournament.

== Tournament results ==
Year	Winning team	Coach	Losing team	Coach	Score	Location	Finals venue
2004	Holy Cross	Paul Pearl	Sacred Heart	Shaun Hannah	4–0	West Point, New York	Tate Rink
2005	Mercyhurst	Rick Gotkin	Quinnipiac	Rand Pecknold	3–2 (OT)	North Branford, Connecticut	Northford Ice Pavilion
2006	Holy Cross (2)	Paul Pearl	Bentley	Ryan Soderquist	5–2	Worcester, Massachusetts	Hart Center
2007	Air Force	Frank Serratore	Army	Brian Riley	6–1	Rochester, New York	Blue Cross Arena
2008	Air Force (2)	Frank Serratore	Mercyhurst	Rick Gotkin	5–4 (2OT)	Rochester, New York	Blue Cross Arena
2009	Air Force (3)	Frank Serratore	Mercyhurst	Rick Gotkin	2–0	Rochester, New York	Blue Cross Arena
2010	RIT	Wayne Wilson	Sacred Heart	C.J. Marottolo	6–1	Rochester, New York	Blue Cross Arena
2011	Air Force (4)	Frank Serratore	RIT	Wayne Wilson	1–0	Rochester, New York	Blue Cross Arena
2012	Air Force (5)	Frank Serratore	RIT	Wayne Wilson	4–0	Rochester, New York	Blue Cross Arena
2013	Canisius	Dave Smith	Mercyhurst	Rick Gotkin	7–2	Rochester, New York	Blue Cross Arena
2014	Robert Morris	Derek Schooley	Canisius	Dave Smith	7–4	Rochester, New York	Blue Cross Arena
2015	RIT (2)	Wayne Wilson	Mercyhurst	Rick Gotkin	5–1	Rochester, New York	Blue Cross Arena
2016	RIT (3)	Wayne Wilson	Robert Morris	Derek Schooley	7–4	Rochester, New York	Blue Cross Arena
2017	Air Force (6)	Frank Serratore	Robert Morris	Derek Schooley	2–1	Rochester, New York	Blue Cross Arena
2018	Air Force (7)	Frank Serratore	Robert Morris	Derek Schooley	5–1	Rochester, New York	Blue Cross Arena
2019	American International	Eric Lang	Niagara	Jason Lammers	3–2 (OT)	Buffalo, New York	Harborcenter
2020	Cancelled due to the coronavirus pandemic					Buffalo, New York	Harborcenter
2021	American International (2)	Eric Lang	Canisius	Trevor Large	5–2	Springfield, Massachusetts	MassMutual Center
2022	American International (3)	Eric Lang	Air Force	Frank Serratore	7–0	Utica, New York	Adirondack Bank Center
2023	Canisius (2)	Trevor Large	Holy Cross	Bill Riga	3–0	Buffalo, New York	LECOM Harborcenter
2024	RIT (4)	Wayne Wilson	American International	Eric Lang	5–2	Henrietta, New York	Gene Polisseni Center
2025	Bentley	Andy Jones	Holy Cross	Bill Riga	6-3	Worcester, Massachusetts	Hart Center
2026	Bentley	Andy Jones	Sacred Heart	C.J. Marottolo	3-2	Waltham, Mass	Bentley Arena

== Championship round performance ==
=== By school ===
School	Championships	Appearances	Pct.
Air Force	7	8	.875
RIT	4	6	.667
Mercyhurst	1	5	.200
American International	3	4	.750
Canisius	2	4	.500
Holy Cross	2	3	.667
Robert Morris	1	4	.250
Sacred Heart	0	2	.000
Army	0	1	.000
Bentley	0	1	.000
Niagara	0	1	.000
Quinnipiac	0	1	.000

=== By coach ===
Coach	Championships	Appearances	Pct.
Frank Serratore	7	8	.875
Wayne Wilson	4	6	.667
Eric Lang	3	4	.750
Paul Pearl	2	2	1.000
Rick Gotkin	1	5	.200
Derek Schooley	1	4	.250
Trevor Large	1	2	.500
Dave Smith	1	2	.500
C. J. Marottolo	0	1	.000
Shaun Hannah	0	1	.000
Jason Lammers	0	1	.000
Rand Pecknold	0	1	.000
Ryan Soderquist	0	1	.000
Brian Riley	0	1	.000

== Location of tournaments ==
- 2004: Tate Rink, West Point, New York
- 2005: Northford Ice Pavilion, North Branford, Connecticut
- 2006: Hart Center at the Luth Athletics Complex, Worcester, Massachusetts
- 2007–18: Blue Cross Arena, Rochester, New York
- 2019–20: LECOM Harborcenter, Buffalo, New York
- 2021: MassMutual Center, Springfield, Massachusetts
- 2022: Adirondack Bank Center, Utica, New York
- 2023–24: Campus Sites

== Formats ==
2004-2005

The AHA Tournament format begins as a single-game elimination three-round format, with an additional play-in game for the teams the finished eighth and ninth.

2006

After Quinnipiac leaves to join the ECAC, the 8-team conference drops the play-in game from the tournament.

2007

With Air Force and RIT joining the conference, but with RIT's ineligibility for the conference tournament, a play-in game was added for one year.

2008

The opening round becomes a best-of-three with 5 separate series played between all ten of the conference teams with the two remaining lowest-seeded teams playing in a final-five game to determine the last semifinalist. All series after the opening round are single-elimination.

2009-2010

The four lowest-seeded teams play two play-in games to determine the final two qualifiers for the quarterfinals.

2011

With Niagara and Robert Morris joining the conference, the tournament was expanded to have four rounds. The tournament competitors were split into two groups: 'East' and 'West', and each group was arranged to play so that the top two finishers for each group received a bye into the quarterfinals while the remaining four teams in each group played single-elimination games to advance to the quarterfinals. The quarterfinals remained a best-of-three format while the final four stayed as single-elimination games.

2012-2013

The 'East' and 'West' groupings were dropped and the opening round became a best-of-three series with the top four finishers receiving byes into the quarterfinals.

2023

The tournament was shortened to three rounds, with the top eight finishers all appearing in the quarterfinal round. Two best-of-three semifinal series and the AHA championship game were all moved to campus sites and hosted by the higher seed in each matchup.

2024

With Robert Morris rejoining the conference, the tournament was once again expanded to four rounds to include all eleven teams. The top five finishers all received a first round bye while play-in games were held among the remaining six teams to determine the final three quarterfinals participants. Following the merger of the CHA and AHA, 2024 would mark the tournament's final year.
