= Metro Atlantic Athletic Conference men's ice hockey tournament =

MAAC Tournament (defunct)
- Conference hockey championship
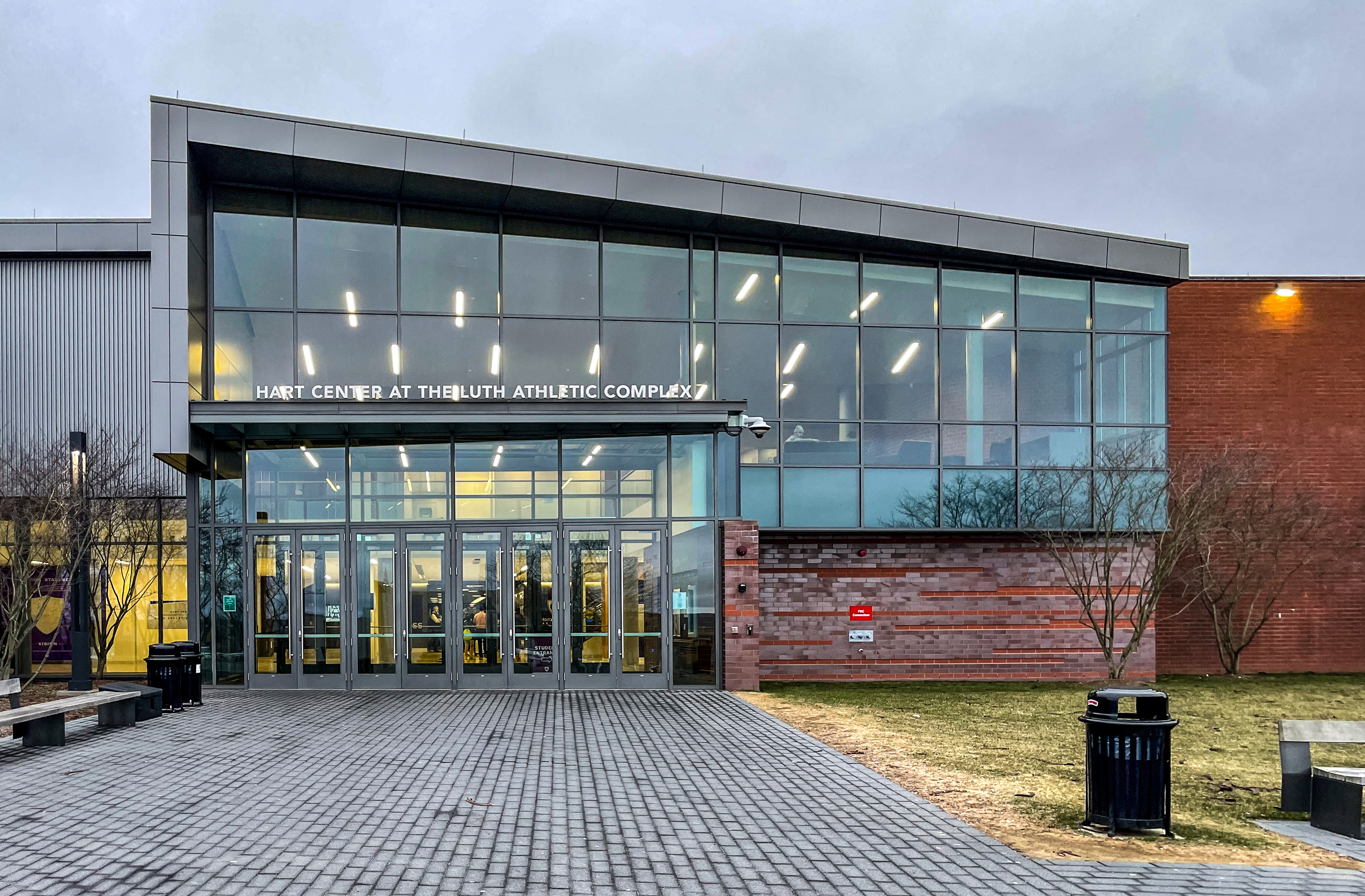
- Holy Cross's Hart Center hosted the inaugural 1999 MAAC Championship game. It is tied with UConn's UConn Ice Arena for most times hosting the championship game.
- Sport: College ice hockey
- Conference: Metro Atlantic Athletic Conference
- Number of teams: 8
- Format: Single-elimination
- Current stadium: Campus sites
- Played: 1999–2003
- Last contest: 2003 MAAC Tournament
- Current champion: Mercyhurst (second win)
- Most championships: Mercyhurst (two wins)

The MAAC men's ice hockey tournament was the conference tournament for the Metro Atlantic Athletic Conference (MAAC), an NCAA Division I athletic conference that sponsored ice hockey from 1998 to 2003 and changed its name to Metro Conference in 2026. Beginning in 2001, the winner of the tournament received an automatic berth into the NCAA Tournament.

== History ==
In Fall of 1997, the MAAC announced it would begin sponsoring hockey, with three of its members supporting the sport. To fill in the remaining spots in the conference, the MAAC brought in five associate members. In the first year of the conference, a conference tournament was held to determine a champion. Holy Cross would end up winning the inaugural tournament over Canisius with a score of 4–3. Unfortunately, the tournament was not able to offer an auto-bid to the NCAA tournament, so this would end up being Holy Cross's last game of the season. By the 2000–01 season, the MAAC had expanded to eleven teams, and beginning with the 2001 tournament, the conference was finally able to offer an auto-bid to the NCAA tournament, this time going to Mercyhurst. Following the 2002–03 season, two members, Fairfield and Iona, dropped hockey, leaving the MAAC with eight associate hockey members and one full member. At the time, MAAC rules did not allow associate members to vote in conference decisions, meaning nearly all MAAC hockey members had no voice in what was happening in their conference. Due to this, the nine remaining members split off and formed the Atlantic Hockey conference. The final winner of the MAAC tournament was Mercyhurst. The MAAC tournament was succeeded by the Atlantic Hockey tournament and later the Atlantic Hockey America tournament.

== Tournament results ==
| Year | Winning team | Coach | Losing team | Coach | Score | Location | Finals venue |
|---|---|---|---|---|---|---|---|
| 1999 | Holy Cross | Paul Pearl | Canisius | Brian Cavanaugh | 4–3 | Worcester, Massachusetts | Hart Center |
| 2000 | Connecticut | Bruce Marshall | Iona | Frank Bretti | 6–1 | Storrs, Connecticut | UConn Ice Arena |
| 2001 | Mercyhurst | Rick Gotkin | Quinnipiac | Rand Pecknold | 6–5 | Storrs, Connecticut | UConn Ice Arena |
| 2002 | Quinnipiac | Rand Pecknold | Mercyhurst | Rick Gotkin | 6–4 | Worcester, Massachusetts | Hart Center |
| 2003 | Mercyhurst (2) | Rick Gotkin | Quinnipiac | Rand Pecknold | 4–3 | West Point, New York | Tate Rink |

== Championship round performance ==
| School | Championships | Appearances | Pct |
|---|---|---|---|
| Mercyhurst | 2 | 3 | .667 |
| Quinnipiac | 1 | 3 | .333 |
| Connecticut | 1 | 1 | 1.000 |
| Holy Cross | 1 | 1 | 1.000 |
| Canisius | 0 | 1 | .000 |
| Iona | 0 | 1 | .000 |

== Location of Men's MAAC tournaments ==
- 1999: Hart Center, Worcester, Massachusetts
- 2000–2001: UConn Ice Arena, Storrs, Connecticut
- 2002: Hart Center, Worcester, Massachusetts
- 2003: Tate Rink, West Point, New York

== See also ==
- MAAC Tournament Most Valuable Player
