= Atlantic Hockey Most Valuable Player in Tournament =

- Sport: Ice hockey
- Awarded for: The Most Valuable Player in the Atlantic Hockey Conference Tournament

History
- First award: 2004
- Final award: 2024
- Most recent: Elijah Gonsalves

The Atlantic Hockey Most Valuable Player in Tournament was an annual award given out at the conclusion of the Atlantic Hockey conference tournament to the most valuable player in the championship as voted by the coaches of each Atlantic Hockey team. The recipient of the tournament MVP has come from the championship team each time it has been awarded. (as of 2013)

== Award winners ==
Year	Winner	Position	School
2004	Greg Kealey	Forward	Holy Cross
2005	Scott Champagne	Left wing	Mercyhurst
2006	James Sixsmith	Left wing	Holy Cross
2007	Mike Phillipich	Forward	Air Force
2008	Brent Olson	Forward	Air Force
2009	Matt Fairchild	Forward	Air Force
2010	Cameron Burt	Center	RIT
2011	Jacques Lamoureux	Center	Air Force
2012	Jason Torf	Goaltender	Air Force
2013	Kyle Gibbons	Forward	Canisius
2014	Cody Wydo	Forward	Robert Morris

Year	Winner	Position	School
2015	Matt Garbowsky	Forward	RIT
2016	Myles Powell	Forward	RIT
2017	Shane Starrett	Goaltender	Air Force
2018	Billy Christopoulos	Goaltender	Air Force
2019	Zackarias Skog	Goaltender	American International
2020	Not awarded due to the coronavirus pandemic		
2021	Justin Cole	Forward	American International
2022	Blake Bennett	Forward	American International
2023	Jacob Barczewski	Goaltender	Canisius
2024	Elijah Gonsalves	Right wing	RIT

=== Winners by school ===
School	Winners
Air Force	7
RIT	4
American International	3
Canisius	2
Holy Cross	2
Mercyhurst	1
Robert Morris	1

=== Winners by position ===
Position	Winners
Center	4
Right wing	1
Left wing	2
Forward	8
Defenceman	0
Goaltender	5

== See also ==
- Atlantic Hockey Awards
- MAAC Tournament Most Valuable Player
