= Atlantic Hockey America men's tournament =

- Conference hockey championship
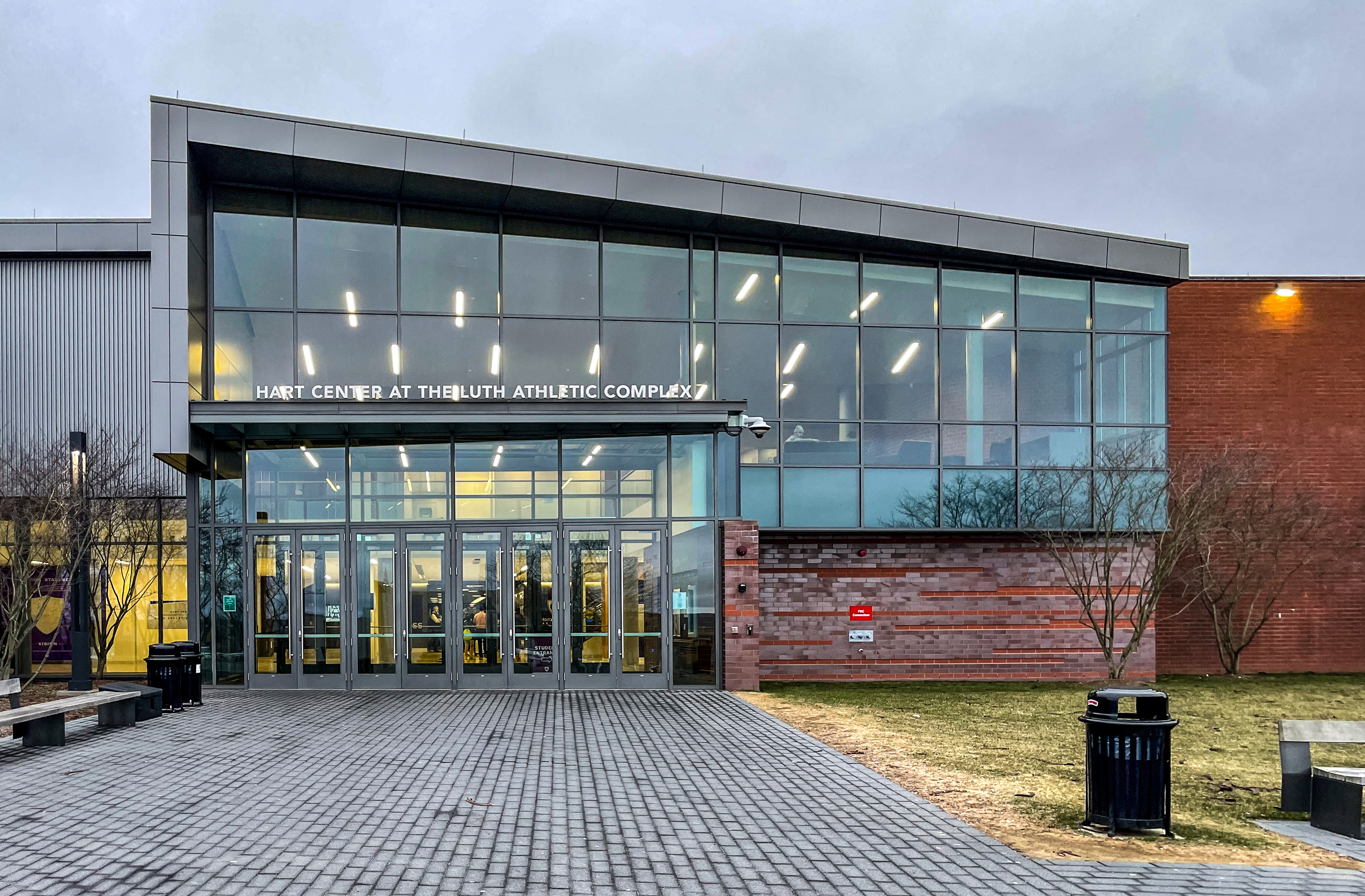
- Holy Cross's Hart Center hosted the inaugural championship game in 2025.
- Sport: Ice hockey
- Conference: Atlantic Hockey America
- Number of teams: 11
- Format: Single-elimination / best-of-three tournament
- Played: 2025 – Present
- Last contest: 2025 AHA tournament
- Current champion: Bentley (first title)
- Most championships: Bentley (one title)
- Winner trophy: Riley Trophy
- Official website: Atlantic Hockey America

The Atlantic Hockey America men's tournament is the conference tournament for the Atlantic Hockey America. The winner of the tournament receives an automatic berth into the NCAA Division I men's ice hockey tournament.

== History ==
The tournament was first held in 2025, following the merger between Atlantic Hockey and College Hockey America. The inaugural tournament continued the same format as the final tournament for Atlantic Hockey; all member teams participated in a modified eleven-team bracket. The top five teams, according to league standings, received byes into the quarterfinal round while the lowest six teams were arranged into first round matches. The quarterfinal and semifinal rounds were best-of-three series while the first round and championship matches were single elimination.

== Championships by season ==
Year	Winning team	Coach	Losing team	Coach	Score	Location	Venue
2025	Bentley	Andy Jones	Holy Cross	Bill Riga	6–3	Worcester, Massachusetts	Hart Center

== Championship appearances ==
=== By school ===
School	Championships	Appearances	Pct
Bentley	1	1	1.000
Holy Cross	0	1	.000

=== By coach ===
App.	Coach	Record	Pct
1	Andy Jones	1–0	1.000
1	Bill Riga	0–1	.000

== See also ==
- MAAC ice hockey tournament
- Atlantic Hockey tournament
