= Riley Trophy =

- Sport: College ice hockey
- Awarded for: Atlantic Hockey America men's tournament Champion

History
- First award: 2018
- Most wins: American International (three wins
- Most recent: Bentley

The Riley Trophy is an award given to the Atlantic Hockey America men's tournament champion. The trophy is named after long-time Army head coach Jack Riley and was created a little over a year after the legendary coach's death.

== History ==
Originally awarded by Atlantic Hockey in 2018, the Riley Trophy remained in the possession of the conference when it merged with College Hockey America in 2024. Since it was introduced in 2017, the trophy has gone to the champion of the conference tournament which is typically held around late-February through mid-March.

== Yearly winners ==
Year	Winner	Win #
2018	Air Force	1
2019	American International	1
2020	Not awarded due to COVID-19 pandemic	
2021	American International	2
2022	American International	3
2023	Canisius	1
2024	RIT	1
2025	Bentley	1
2026	Bentley	2

== Championships ==
=== By school ===
School	Championships
American International	3
Bentley	2
Air Force	1
Canisius	1
RIT	1

=== By coach ===
Coach	Championships
Eric Lang	3
Andy Jones	2
Trevor Large	1
Frank Serratore	1
Wayne Wilson	1

== See also ==
- Atlantic Hockey tournament
- Atlantic Hockey America men's tournament
