= 2001 MAAC men's ice hockey tournament =

3rd MAAC Ice Hockey Tournament

2001 MAAC Men's ice hockey tournament
- Dates: March 10–17, 2001
- Teams: 8
- Finals site: UConn Ice Arena; Storrs, Connecticut
- Champions: Mercyhurst (1st title)
- Winning coach: Rick Gotkin (1st title)
- MVP: Jeff Gould (Mercyhurst)
- MAAC Men's Ice Hockey Tournaments

The 2001 MAAC Men's Ice Hockey Tournament was the 3rd championship in the history of the conference. It was played between March 10 and March 17, 2001. Quarterfinal games were played at home team campus sites, while the final four games were played at the UConn Ice Arena in Storrs, Connecticut, the home venue of the Connecticut Huskies. By winning the tournament, Mercyhurst received MAAC's automatic bid to the 2001 NCAA Men's Division I Ice Hockey Tournament.

== Format ==
The tournament featured three rounds of play with each round being single-elimination. The teams that finish below eighth in the standings are ineligible for tournament play. In the first round, the first and eighth seeds, the second and seventh seeds, the third seed and sixth seeds, and the fourth seed and fifth seeds played with the winner advancing to the semifinals. In the semifinals, the highest and lowest seeds and second highest and second lowest seeds play with the winner advancing to the championship game. The tournament champion receives an automatic bid to the 2001 NCAA Men's Division I Ice Hockey Tournament.

== Conference standings ==
Note: GP = Games played; W = Wins; L = Losses; T = Ties; PTS = Points; GF = Goals For; GA = Goals Against

2000–01 Metro Atlantic Athletic Conference standings
| | Conference | | | | | | | Overall | | | | | |
| | GP | W | L | T | PTS | GF | GA | GP | W | L | T | GF | GA |
|---|---|---|---|---|---|---|---|---|---|---|---|---|---|
| #12 Mercyhurst†* | 26 | 19 | 6 | 1 | 39 | 110 | 52 | 36 | 22 | 12 | 2 | 140 | 89 |
| Quinnipiac | 26 | 17 | 7 | 2 | 36 | 106 | 67 | 37 | 22 | 11 | 4 | 141 | 106 |
| Iona | 26 | 16 | 6 | 4 | 36 | 122 | 84 | 35 | 18 | 13 | 4 | 136 | 121 |
| Canisius | 26 | 13 | 9 | 4 | 30 | 95 | 90 | 33 | 17 | 12 | 4 | 117 | 111 |
| Connecticut | 26 | 12 | 11 | 3 | 27 | 94 | 86 | 35 | 12 | 19 | 4 | 108 | 123 |
| Sacred Heart | 26 | 11 | 10 | 5 | 27 | 81 | 76 | 31 | 14 | 12 | 5 | 103 | 91 |
| Army | 26 | 11 | 15 | 0 | 22 | 84 | 101 | 35 | 14 | 20 | 1 | 112 | 132 |
| Fairfield | 26 | 10 | 14 | 2 | 22 | 82 | 104 | 32 | 11 | 19 | 2 | 101 | 139 |
| American International | 26 | 10 | 15 | 1 | 21 | 75 | 96 | 31 | 10 | 20 | 1 | 80 | 123 |
| Holy Cross | 26 | 8 | 16 | 2 | 18 | 81 | 99 | 32 | 8 | 22 | 2 | 89 | 133 |
| Bentley | 26 | 3 | 21 | 2 | 8 | 67 | 142 | 29 | 4 | 23 | 2 | 72 | 153 |
Championship: Mercyhurst † indicates conference regular season champion * indicates conference tournament champion Final rankings: USA Today/American Hockey Magazine Poll Top 15 Poll

== Bracket ==
Teams are reseeded after the quarterfinals

Quarterfinals; March 10
1 | Mercyhurst | 10
8 | Fairfield | 5
4 | Canisius | 4
5 | Connecticut | 1
2 | Quinnipiac | 4*
7 | Army | 3
3 | Iona | 3*
6 | Sacred Heart | 2

Semifinals; March 15
1 | Mercyhurst | 4
4 | Canisius | 3
2 | Quinnipiac | 4
3 | Iona | 1

Championship; March 17
1 | Mercyhurst | 6
2 | Quinnipiac | 5

Note: * denotes overtime period(s)

=== Quarterfinals ===
==== (1) Mercyhurst vs. (8) Fairfield ====
| March 10 | Mercyhurst | 10 – 5 | Fairfield | Mercyhurst Ice Center | Recap |
| (Rynshoven) Adam Tackaberry - 04:27 (Goulet) Jody Robinson - 08:08 | | First period | 18:54 - Tim Viens (Desmarais) |
| (Goulet, Rivers) Eric Ellis - 01:05 (Hiscock) Marty Rychley - 03:47 (Goulet, Ellis) Tom McMonagle - PP - 04:08 (Carter, Olsen) Adam Rivers - GW - 05:26; P.J. Hiscock - SH - 08:06 (Rychley) P.J. Hiscock - 17:43 (Rivers) Mike Carter - 18:06 | | Second period | 10:44 - Blaise Silka (Metz, Gately); 14:06 - James Lubinski (Whelan) |
| (Lyke, Goulet) Tom McMonagle - 04:58 | | Third period | 04:24 - PP - Casey Laflamme (Cotter); 16:50 - Tim Desmarais |
| Peter Aubry ( 20 saves / 25 shots ) | | Goalie stats | Craig Schnappinger ( 22 saves / 32 shots ) |

==== (2) Quinnipiac vs. (7) Army ====
| March 10 | Quinnipiac | 4 – 3 | OT | Army | Northford Ice Pavilion | Recap |
| (Poliquin, Erhart) Ryan Olson - 12:38 | | First period | | 13:51 - SH - Nathan Mayfield (Finnegan, McLean) |
| (Poliquin, Cerrella) Ryan Olson - 03:11 | | Second period | | No scoring |
| (Mansoff, Winkler) Dennis Palaia - 04:59 | | Third period | | 14:09 - PP - Mike Fairman (Fisher, Carpenter); 14:34 - PP - Garrett Brougham (Boyle, Serre) |
| (Poliquin, Olson) Chris Cerrella - GW - 07:44 | | First overtime period | | No scoring |
| Justin Eddy ( 23 saves / 26 shots ) | | Goalie stats | | Scott Hamilton ( 39 saves / 43 shots ) |

==== (3) Iona vs. (6) Sacred Heart ====
| March 10 | Iona | 3 – 2 | OT | Sacred Heart | Sports Plus at New Roc | Recap |
| (Fisher, Bouchard) Ryan Carter - 12:56 | | First period | | 19:14 - Martin Paquet (Fournier, McRae) |
| No scoring | | Second period | | 11:38 - Les Hrapchak (Drake) |
| Nathan Lutz - 15:47 | | Third period | | No scoring |
| (Kellogg, Fisher) Brian Schroeder - GW - 04:03 | | First overtime period | | No scoring |
| Ben Brady ( 32 saves / 34 shots ) | | Goalie stats | | Eddy Ferhi ( 39 saves / 42 shots ) |

==== (4) Canisius vs. (5) Connecticut ====
| March 10 | Canisius | 4 – 1 | Connecticut | Buffalo State Sports Arena | Recap |
| (Deeves) Rob Martin - 09:53 | | First period | No scoring |
| No scoring | | Second period | No scoring |
| (Birch) Todd Houston - GW - 05:44 (Martin, Street) Daryl Pierce - 08:54 (Pierce) Paul DiPasquale - EN SH - 19:55 | | Third period | 12:36 - Mike Anderson (Kamienski, Longobardi) |
| Stephen Fabiilli ( 21 saves / 22 shots ) | | Goalie stats | Jason Casey ( 31 saves / 34 shots ) |

=== Semifinals ===
==== (1) Mercyhurst vs. (4) Canisius ====
| March 15 | Mercyhurst | 4 – 3 | Canisius | UConn Ice Arena | Recap |
| (Robinson, Goulet) Jeff Gould - PP - 10:31 | | First period | 19:36 - PP - Rob Martin (Deeves, Pierce) |
| (Olsen, Rivers) Mike Carter - 05:59 (Tackaberry, Rynshoven) Jeff Gould - 05:16 (Carter) Brad Olsen - GW - 18:35 | | Second period | No scoring |
| No scoring | | Third period | 15:41 - PP - Jeff Street (Deeves, Kenny); 19:27 - EA - Rob Martin (Duggan, Street) |
| Peter Aubry ( 29 saves / 32 shots ) | | Goalie stats | Stephen Fabiilli ( 24 saves / 28 shots ) |

==== (2) Quinnipiac vs. (3) Iona ====
| March 15 | Quinnipiac | 4 – 1 | Iona | UConn Ice Arena | Recap |
| No Scoring | | First period | 13:41 - Michael LoCicero (Segal) |
| (Holtzman, Harris) Bill Class - 02:55 | | Second period | No scoring |
| (Herbert, Harris) Shawn Mansoff - GW PP - 01:04 (Cerrella) Ben Blais - 05:58 (Murray, Morton) Terry Harris - 10:32 | | Third period | No scoring |
| Justin Eddy ( 20 saves / 21 shots ) | | Goalie stats | Ben Brady ( 18 saves / 22 shots ) |

=== Championship ===
==== (1) Mercyhurst vs. (2) Quinnipiac ====
| March 17 | Mercyhurst | 6 – 5 | Quinnipiac | UConn Ice Arena | Recap |
| (Ellis) Louis Goulet - 03:04 (McDonald) Adam Rivers - 08:26 (Robinson, Tackaberry) Jeff Gould - 11:28 | | First period | 00:48 - Brian Herbert (Palaia) |
| (Tackaberry, Gould) Peter Rynshoven - 15:10 | | Second period | 06:54 - Dennis Palaia (Herbert, Mansoff); 07:02 - Jed Holtzman (Blais) |
| (Goulet, Brown) Eric Ellis - 11:00 (Ellis, Goulet) Mike Carter - GW - 13:12 | | Third period | 01:37 - PP - Todd Bennett (Holtzman, Breen); 08:33 - Terry Harris (Morton, Blais) |
| Peter Aubry ( 27 saves / 32 shots ) | | Goalie stats | Justin Eddy ( 16 saves / 22 shots ) |

== Tournament awards ==
=== All-Tournament Team ===
- F Jeff Gould* (Mercyhurst)
- F Mike Carter (Mercyhurst)
- F
- D Jody Robinson (Mercyhurst)
- D
- G Peter Aubrey (Mercyhurst)

* Most Valuable Player(s)
