= 2025 Atlantic Hockey America men's tournament =

2025 Atlantic Hockey America men's ice hockey tournament
- Dates: February 28–March 22, 2025
- Teams: 11
- Finals site: Hart Center; Worcester, Massachusetts
- Champions: Bentley (1st title)
- Winning coach: Andy Jones (1st title)
- Atlantic Hockey America men's Ice Hockey Tournaments

The 2025 Atlantic Hockey America Tournament was the inaugural edition of the Atlantic Hockey America Tournament. It was played between February 28 and March 22, 2025. By winning the tournament, Bentley received Atlantic Hockey America's automatic bid to the 2025 NCAA Division I men's ice hockey tournament.

As this is the successor to the Atlantic Hockey postseason tournament, the league took possession of the Riley Trophy and it will continue to be awarded to the league's tournament champion.

== Format ==
Similar to the preceding Atlantic Hockey tournament, this tournament featured four rounds of play, with all eleven conference teams participating. The top five teams, according to the conference standings, received byes to the quarterfinal round. The remaining six teams were arranged so that the sixth seed played the eleventh seed, the seventh seed played the tenth seed and the eighth seed played the ninth seed in the first round matches. The winners of the first-round games were reseeded for the quarterfinal round with the new eighth-, seventh-, and sixth-seeded teams facing the first-, second-, and third-place teams respectively. The fourth- and fifth-overall seeds were also set to play each other in the last quarterfinal round. The winners of the quarterfinal round were then reseeded so that the top remaining seed played the lowest remaining seed while the other two semifinalists met. The winners of the semifinal matches advanced to the championship to determine which team received the conference's automatic bid to the 2025 NCAA Division I men's ice hockey tournament. The quarterfinal and semifinal rounds were best-of-three series while the championship and first round matches were single elimination. All matchups were hosted by the higher-seeded team.

== Conference standings ==
2024–25 Atlantic Hockey America Standings
	Conference record										Overall record					
	GP	W	L	T	OW	OL	SW	PTS	GF	GA	GP	W	L	T	GF	GA
Holy Cross †	26	19	5	2	4	0	1	56	92	47	40	24	14	2	130	94
Sacred Heart	26	16	7	3	1	1	2	53	80	64	39	21	13	5	118	101
#19 Bentley *	26	16	9	1	1	2	1	51	79	57	40	23	15	2	115	83
Niagara	26	15	9	2	3	3	1	48	90	70	37	18	16	3	124	109
Army	26	14	10	2	2	0	2	44	84	74	38	16	20	2	105	117
Canisius	26	11	13	2	0	3	0	38	84	79	37	12	23	2	98	120
Air Force	26	11	13	2	2	3	1	37	59	58	40	16	21	3	86	112
American International	26	9	16	1	0	3	0	31	63	77	38	13	23	2	92	117
RIT	26	9	15	2	2	0	1	28	65	102	35	10	23	2	82	133
Robert Morris	26	7	15	4	1	2	1	27	72	86	35	10	20	5	95	115
Mercyhurst	26	4	19	3	1	0	2	16	59	113	35	4	27	4	77	150
Championship: March 22, 2025 † indicates conference regular season champion (DeGregorio Trophy) * indicates conference tournament champion (Riley Trophy); Rankings: USCHO.com Top 20 Poll

== Bracket ==
Note: Teams are reseeded after the First Round and Quarterfinals.

First Round; February 28–March 1
6	Canisius	2
11	Mercyhurst	0
7	Air Force	4**
10	Robert Morris	3
8	American International	2*
9	RIT	1

Quarterfinals; March 7–9
1	Holy Cross	2	3	4*
8	American International	3	2	3
2	Sacred Heart	4	2	4
7	Air Force	1	3	1
3	Bentley	4	2	-
6	Canisius	0	0	-
4	Niagara	2	4	3
5	Army	3**	3	4*

Semifinals; March 14–16
1	Holy Cross	3*	5	-
5	Army	2	1	-
2	Sacred Heart	2	0	-
3	Bentley	5	3	-

Championship; March 22
1	Holy Cross	3
3	Bentley	6

Note: * denotes overtime period(s)

== Results ==
Note: All game times are local.

=== First Round ===
==== (6) Canisius vs. (11) Mercyhurst ====
March 1, 2025; 5:00 pm	Canisius	2–0 (1–0, 0–0, 1–0)	Mercyhurst	LECOM Harborcenter; Attendance: 293

Game reference
Ben Bonisteel	Goalies	Carter McPhail	Referees: Ronald Morello; Brendan Blanchard; Linesmen: Brendan Lewis; Brian Kimmins
(unassisted) Kyle Haskins (11) – GW – 09:50 / 1–0; (Alton McDermott) Grant Porter (10) – 49:37 / 2–0			Referees: Ronald Morello; Brendan Blanchard; Linesmen: Brendan Lewis; Brian Kimmins
4 min	Penalties	4 min	Referees: Ronald Morello; Brendan Blanchard; Linesmen: Brendan Lewis; Brian Kimmins
33	Shots	16	Referees: Ronald Morello; Brendan Blanchard; Linesmen: Brendan Lewis; Brian Kimmins

==== (7) Air Force vs. (10) Robert Morris ====
March 1, 2025; 5:00 pm	Air Force	4–3 (2OT) (1–2, 1–0, 1–1, 0–0, 1–0)	Robert Morris	Cadet Ice Arena; Attendance: 1,355

Game reference

Guy Blessing
Goalies
Croix Kochendorfer
Referees:
Andrew Bethmann
William McGoldrick
Linesmen:
Owen Ells
Gregg Leonardo

	0–1	06:16 – Tanner Klimpke (9) (van Why, Garvey)
(Sajevic, Stitz) Will Dawson (2) – 11:27	1–1
	1–2	13:57 – PP – Michael Felsing (7) (Craig, Klimpke)
(Stitz, Hedden) Clayton Cosentino (8) – PP – 26:08	2–2
(Dawson, Morque) Sam Stitz (8) – 44:57	3–2
	3–3	50:24 – Tanner Klimpke (10) (Craig, Wilson)
(Hedden, Cosentino) Anthony Yu (2) – GW – 93:30	4–3

4 min
Penalties
9 min
54
Shots
37

==== (8) American International vs. (9) RIT ====
February 28, 2025; 6:05 pm	American International	2–1 (OT) (0–0, 0–1, 1–0, 1–0)	RIT	MassMutual Center; Attendance: 171

Game reference

Chase Clark
Goalies
Ethan David
Referees:
Andy O'Brien
Christopher Leavitt
Linesmen:
Patrick Philbin
Cameron Carlson

	0–1	26:21 – Philippe Jacques (4) (Hobbs, Whyte)
(Malinowski, Lindberg) John Lundy (9) – 43:14	1–1
(Geschwind, Rylance) Casey McDonald (2) – GW – 66:01	2–1

2 min
Penalties
2 min
35
Shots
32

=== Quarterfinals ===
==== (1) Holy Cross vs. (8) American International ====
March 7, 2025; 7:00 pm	Holy Cross	2–3 (0–1, 0–2, 2–0)	American International	Hart Center; Attendance: 614

Game reference

Thomas Gale
Goalies
Chase Clark
Referees:
Ron Morello
Christopher Leavitt
Linesmen:
Conor Foley
Steven Riley Jr.

	0–1	10:45 – Alfred Lindberg (7) (Khokhlachev, Sertti)
	0–2	27:11 – Josh Barnes (14) (Khokhlachev)
	0–3	28:50 – GW – Oscar Geschwind (5) (Rylance, McDonald)
(Oliphant) Jack Seymour (6) – 46:32	1–3
(Stockfish, Kursonis) Matt DeBoer (2) – EA – 58:24	2–3

10 min
Penalties
25 min
36
Shots
19

March 8, 2025; 7:00 pm	Holy Cross	3–2 (2–1, 0–1, 1–0)	American International	Hart Center; Attendance: 678

Game reference

Thomas Gale
Goalies
Chase Clark
Referees:
Ron Morello
Christopher Leavitt
Linesmen:
Conor Foley
Steven Riley Jr.

(Kursonis, Oliphant) Liam McLinskey (21) – PP – 04:55	1–0
(Abgrall, McLinskey) Mack Oliphant (3) – SH – 11:08	2–0
	2–1	11:37 – Brett Rylance (7) (unassisted)
	2–2	23:28 – Casey McDonald (3) (Mexico, Rylance)
(Phillips, DeBoer) Jack Stockfish (15) – GW – 56:19	3–2

15 min
Penalties
26 min
34
Shots
29

March 9, 2025; 5:00 pm	Holy Cross	4–3 (OT) (1–0, 1–2, 1–1, 1–0)	American International	Hart Center; Attendance: 852

Game reference

Thomas Gale
Goalies
Chase Clark
Referees:
Ron Morello
Christopher Leavitt
Linesmen:
Conor Foley
Steven Riley Jr.

(unassisted) Brody Gagno (1) – SH – 10:58	1–0
	1–1	24:30 – PP – John Lundy (10) (Stella, Serdachny)
(Phillips, Oliphant) Liam McLinskey (22) – PP – 29:00	2–1
	2–2	32:53 – Justin Mexico (3) (Lundy, Posma)
(Kursonis, Oliphant) Matt DeBoer (11) – PP – 41:10	3–2
	3–3	59:25 – PP EA – Brett Bamber (7) (Serdachny, Beljo)
(McLinskey, Elias) Michael Abgral (7) – GW – 60:51	4–3

14 min
Penalties
4 min
34
Shots
23

Holy Cross wins series 2–1

==== (2) Sacred Heart vs. (7) Air Force ====
March 7, 2025; 7:00 pm	Sacred Heart	4–1 (1–1, 2–0, 1–0)	Air Force	Martire Family Arena; Attendance: 1,788

Game reference

Ajeet Gundarah
Goalies
Guy Blessing
Referees:
Matthew Fuller
Ryan Sweeney
Linesmen:
Joshua Cleary
Dylan Lewis

(Driscoll, Guerra) Tyler Ghirardosi (7) – 04:02	1–0
	1–1	18:44 – Anthony Yu (4) (Schwartz, Cunningham)
(Hlusiak, Rubin) John Jaworski (11) – GW – 23:14	2–1
(Guerra, Ghirardosi) Max Dorrington (12) – 26:54	3–1
(Jaworski) Tyler Ghirardosi (8) – EN – 59:48	4–1

16 min
Penalties
2 min
23
Shots
30

March 8, 2025; 7:00 pm	Sacred Heart	2–3 (2OT) (1–0, 0–1, 1–1, 0–0, 0–1)	Air Force	Martire Family Arena; Attendance: 2,215

Game reference

Ajeet Gundarah
Goalies
Guy Blessing
Referees:
Matthew Fuller
Ryan Sweeney
Linesmen:
Joshua Cleary
Dylan Lewis

(Sansbury, VanRooyan) Reid Pabich (12) – 03:21	1–0
	1–1	18:44 – Andrew DeCarlo (5) (Jacobs, Hedden)
(Driscoll, Sansbury) Matthew Guerra (11) – 43:53	2–1
	2–2	48:52 – SH – Mitchell Digby (3) (Oliphant, McCormick)
	2–3	99:27 – GW – Austin Schwartz (12) (Chris Hedden, Gibbons)

4 min
Penalties
10 min
34
Shots
58

March 9, 2025; 5:00 pm	Sacred Heart	4–1 (0–0, 1–0, 3–1)	Air Force	Martire Family Arena; Attendance: 1,709

Game reference

Ajeet Gundarah
Goalies
Guy Blessing
Referees:
Matthew Fuller
Ryan Sweeney
Linesmen:
Joshua Cleary
Dylan Lewis

(Pabich) John Jaworski (12) – 38:22	1–0
(Rubin) Jake Bongo (3) – GW – 44:09	2–0
(Jaworski) Reid Pabich (13) – EN – 55:18	3–0
(Joughin, Driscoll) Cole Galata (6) – EN – 56:35	4–0
	4–1	58:51 – Clayton Cosentino (9) (Hedden, Schwartz)

8 min
Penalties
2 min
31
Shots
30

Sacred Heart wins series 2–1

==== (3) Bentley vs. (6) Canisius ====
March 7, 2025; 7:00 pm	Bentley	4–0 (2–0, 1–0, 1–0)	Canisius	Bentley Arena; Attendance: 1,389

Game reference

Connor Hasley
Goalies
Ben Bonisteel
Referees:
Brendan Blanchard
William McGoldrick III
Linesmen:
Cameron Carlson
Patrick Philbin

(Main, Merritt) Nik Armstrong-Kingkade (9) – GW – 03:13	1–0
(unassisted) Nick Bochen (2) – 19:45	2–0
(Doyle, Kramer) Jake Black (3) – 25:15	3–0
(Hodges, Bochen) Jake Black (4) – 46:28	4–0

8 min
Penalties
4 min
31
Shots
26

March 8, 2025; 7:00 pm	Bentley	2–0 (0–0, 0–0, 2–0)	Canisius	Bentley Arena; Attendance: 1,204

Game reference
Connor Hasley	Goalies	Ben Bonisteel	Referees: Brendan Blanchard; William McGoldrick III; Linesmen: Cameron Carlson; Patrick Philbin
(Bakkevig, Hodges) Arlo Merritt (8) – GW – 43:29 / 1–0; (Hjartarson, Main) Ethan Leyh (14) – EN – 58:23 / 2–0			Referees: Brendan Blanchard; William McGoldrick III; Linesmen: Cameron Carlson; Patrick Philbin
2 min	Penalties	2 min	Referees: Brendan Blanchard; William McGoldrick III; Linesmen: Cameron Carlson; Patrick Philbin
32	Shots	25	Referees: Brendan Blanchard; William McGoldrick III; Linesmen: Cameron Carlson; Patrick Philbin

Bentley wins series 2–0

==== (4) Niagara vs. (5) Army ====
March 7, 2025; 7:00 pm	Niagara	2–3 (2OT) (1–0, 1–1, 0–1, 0–0, 0–1)	Army	Dwyer Arena; Attendance: 603

Game reference

Pierce Charleson
Goalies
J. J. Cataldo
Referees:
Mark Dungan
Andrew O'Brien
Linesmen:
Joseph Gladnick
James Rogosky

(Ahearn, Ott) Tyler Wallace (14) – 11:12	1–0
	1–1	25:40 – Ben Ivey (4) (Forselius, Keefer)
(Prohorenkovs, Hoskin) Jay Ahearn (17) – 28:26	2–1
	2–2	43:58 – Adam Marshall (7) (Gilbert, Woodring)
	2–3	94:39 – GW PP – Mac Gadowsky (13) (Woodring, Forselius)

20 min
Penalties
10 min
50
Shots
67

March 8, 2025; 7:00 pm	Niagara	4–3 (1–0, 1–1, 2–2)	Army	Dwyer Arena; Attendance: 618

Game reference

Pierce Charleson
Goalies
J. J. Cataldo
Referees:
Mark Dungan
Andrew O'Brien
Linesmen:
Joseph Gladnick
James Rogosky

(B. Roloson, Rødne) Kyler Kleven (3) – 12:33	1–0
	1–1	21:58 – Mac Gadowsky (14) (Baez)
(Hoskin, R. Roloson) Jay Ahearn (18) – PP – 31:31	2–1
(Kleven, Carlin) Lars Rødne (10) – 42:30	3–1
(Young) Grayson Dietrich (5) – GW SH – 44:08	4–1
	4–2	55:20 – Mac Gadowsky (15) (unassisted)
	4–3	59:46 – EA – Ben Ivey (7) (Gadowsky, Patterson)

6 min
Penalties
6 min
29
Shots
39

March 9, 2025; 5:00 pm	Niagara	3–4 (OT) (1–0, 0–2, 2–1, 0–1)	Army	Dwyer Arena; Attendance: 608

Game reference

Pierce Charleson
Goalies
J. J. Cataldo
Referees:
Mark Dungan
Andrew O'Brien
Linesmen:
Joseph Gladnick
James Rogosky

(Hackett) Spencer Young (7) – 11:25	1–0
	1–1	22:59 – SH – Nik Hong (10) (Marshall)
	1–2	39:52 – Ben Ivey (8) (Gadowsky, Groebner)
(Prohorenkovs) Jay Ahearn (19) – 42:50	2–2
	2–3	48:04 – Easton Zueger (2) (Ivey)
(Ahearn, R. Roloson) Shane Ott (9) – EA – 57:54	3–3
	3–4	62:45 – GW PP – Barron Woodring (10) (Ivey, Gadowsky)

4 min
Penalties
6 min
37
Shots
42

Army wins series 2–1

=== Semifinals ===
==== (1) Holy Cross vs. (5) Army ====
March 14, 2025; 7:00 pm	Holy Cross	3–2 (OT) (2–1, 0–1, 0–0, 1–0)	Army	Hart Center; Attendance: 2,157

Game reference

Thomas Gale
Goalies
J. J. Cataldo
Referees:
Ryan Sweeney
Brendan Blanchard
Linesmen:
Joe Sherman
Brendan Lewis

(Gelatt) Matthew Kursonis (8) – 01:49	1–0
	1–1	17:10 – Mac Gadowsky (16) (Baez, Sacco)
(DeBoer, McLinskey) Devin Phillips (9) – PP – 17:10	2–1
	2–2	30:20 – PP – Barron Woodring (11) (Gadowsky, Ivey)
(Stockfish, Gagno) Devin Phillips (10) – GW – 63:15	3–2

10 min
Penalties
8 min
39
Shots
47

March 15, 2025; 7:00 pm	Holy Cross	5–1 (2–0, 2–1, 1–0)	Army	Hart Center; Attendance: 1,341

Game reference

Thomas Gale
Goalies
J. J. Cataldo
Referees:
Ryan Sweeney
Brendan Blanchard
Linesmen:
Joe Sherman
Brendan Lewis

(DeBoer, McLinskey) Matthew Kursonis (9) – PP – 10:51	1–0
(Gelatt, McLinskey) Michael Abgrall (8) – GW – 14:46	2–0
(DeBoer, Elias) Jack Seymour (7) – 26:22	3–0
(Abgrall, Oliphant) Ty Gagno (4) – SH – 27:07	4–0
	4–1	38:33 – Nik Hong (11) (Patterson, Willey)
(unassisted) Liam McLinskey (23) – EN – 59:35	5–1

8 min
Penalties
19 min
21
Shots
30

Holy Cross wins series 2–0

==== (2) Sacred Heart vs. (3) Bentley ====
March 14, 2025; 7:00 pm	Sacred Heart	2–5 (2–0, 0–2, 0–3)	Bentley	Martire Family Arena; Attendance: 2,301

Game reference

Ajeet Gundarah
Goalies
Connor Hasley
Referees:
Matthew Fuller
Christopher Leavitt
Linesmen:
Conor Foley
Patrick Philbin

(Pabich, Sansbury) John Jaworski (13) – 03:28	1–0
(Driscoll) Mikey Adamson (12) – 11:56	2–0
	2–1	34:18 – PP – Oskar Bakkevig (9) (Castagna, Leyh)
	2–2	35:44 – PP – Nik Armstrong-Kingkade (10) (Black, Hodges)
	2–3	48:51 – GW – A. J. Hodges (6) (Salo, Duerr)
	2–4	50:40 – A. J. Hodges (7) (Main)
	2–5	59:47 – EN – A. J. Hodges (8) (Bochen)

21 min
Penalties
2 min
22
Shots
35

March 15, 2025; 5:00 pm	Sacred Heart	0–3 (0–1, 0–0, 0–2)	Bentley	Martire Family Arena; Attendance: 2,700

Game reference

Ajeet Gundarah
Goalies
Connor Hasley
Referees:
Matthew Fuller
Christopher Leavitt
Linesmen:
Conor Foley
Patrick Philbin

0–1	00:56 – GW – Ethan Leyh (15) (Armstrong-Kingkade, Hodges)
0–2	58:10 – EN – Oskar Bakkevig (10) (unassisted)
0–3	59:44 – EN – Ethan Leyh (16) (unassisted)

9 min
Penalties
4 min
26
Shots
36

Bentley wins series 2–0

=== Championship ===
==== (1) Holy Cross vs. (3) Bentley ====
March 22, 2025; 7:00 pm	Holy Cross	3–6 (2–0, 0–3, 1–3)	Bentley	Hart Center; Attendance: 2,717

Game reference

Thomas Gale
Goalies
Connor Hasley
Referees:
Brendan Blanchard
Ryan Sweeney
Linesmen:
Brendan Lewis
Joe Sherman

(Kursonis, Elias) Liam McLinskey (24) – PP – 13:54	1–0
(McLinskey, Oliphant) Matthew Kursonis (10) – PP – 16:52	2–0
	2–1	26:34 – Tucker Hodgson (3) (Helledy, Hjartarson)
	2–2	27:11 – EA – Nik Armstrong-Kingkade (11) (Castagna, Bochen)
	2–3	30:38 – Nick Bochen (9) (Armstrong-Kingkade)
(McLinskey, Oliphant) Devin Phillips (11) – PP – 46:53	3–3
	3–4	49:16 – GW – Sam Duerr (8) (Armstrong-Kingkade, Leyh)
	3–5	54:38 – A. J. Hodges (8) (Hjartarson)
	3–6	57:08 – EN – Nik Armstrong-Kingkade (8) (Leyh)

2 min
Penalties
6 min
20
Shots
30

== Tournament awards ==
=== All-Tournament Team ===
- F: Liam McLinskey (Holy Cross)
- F: A. J. Hodges (Bentley)
- F: Nik Armstrong-Kingkade (Bentley)
- D: Mac Gadowsky (Army)
- D: Nick Bochen (Bentley)
- G: Connor Hasley* (Bentley)

* Most Outstanding Player(s)
