= 2000 MAAC men's ice hockey tournament =

2000 MAAC Men's ice hockey tournament
- Dates: March 10–18, 2000
- Teams: 8
- Finals site: UConn Ice Arena; Storrs, Connecticut
- Champions: Connecticut (1st title)
- Winning coach: Bruce Marshall (1st title)
- MVP: Marc Senerchia (Connecticut)
- MAAC Men's Ice Hockey Tournaments

The 2000 MAAC Men's Ice Hockey Tournament was the 2nd championship in the history of the conference. It was played between March 10 and March 18, 2000. Quarterfinal games were played at home team campus sites, while the final four games were played at the UConn Ice Arena in Storrs, Connecticut, the home venue of the Connecticut Huskies.

== Format ==
The tournament featured three rounds of play with each round being single-elimination. The teams that finish below eighth in the standings are ineligible for tournament play. In the first round, the first and eighth seeds, the second and seventh seeds, the third seed and sixth seeds, and the fourth seed and fifth seeds played with the winner advancing to the semifinals. In the semifinals, the highest and lowest seeds and second highest and second lowest seeds play with the winner advancing to the championship game. The tournament champion does not receive an automatic bid to the 2000 NCAA Division I Men's Ice Hockey Tournament.

== Conference standings ==
Note: GP = Games played; W = Wins; L = Losses; T = Ties; PTS = Points; GF = Goals For; GA = Goals Against

1999–00 Metro Atlantic Athletic Conference standings
	Conference							Overall					
	GP	W	L	T	PTS	GF	GA	GP	W	L	T	GF	GA
Quinnipiac†	27	23	1	3	49	152	60	36	27	6	3	195	95
Mercyhurst	27	19	6	2	40	113	64	37	23	10	4	143	94
Canisius	27	16	8	3	35	93	79	35	21	10	4	113	95
Connecticut*	27	15	11	1	31	104	77	36	19	16	1	133	116
Sacred Heart	27	14	10	3	31	86	74	34	16	15	3	104	104
Iona	27	13	12	2	28	93	93	37	17	17	3	126	132
Holy Cross	27	8	16	3	19	83	110	35	8	24	3	98	158
Bentley	27	7	18	2	16	90	130	32	7	23	2	98	159
American International	27	5	19	3	13	72	124	30	7	20	3	83	136
Fairfield	27	3	22	2	8	69	144	34	3	28	3	78	183
Championship: Connecticut † indicates conference regular season champion * indicates conference tournament champion Final rankings: USA Today/American Hockey Magazine Poll Top 15 Poll

== Bracket ==
Teams are reseeded after the quarterfinals

Quarterfinals; March 10–11
1	Quinnipiac	9
8	Bentley	2
3	Canisius	3
6	Iona	4
2	Mercyhurst	10
7	Holy Cross	3
4	Connecticut	5
5	Sacred Heart	4

Semifinals; March 16
1	Quinnipiac	2
6	Iona	6
2	Mercyhurst	0
4	Connecticut	2

Championship; March 18
6	Iona	1
4	Connecticut	6

Note: * denotes overtime period(s)

=== Quarterfinals ===
==== (1) Quinnipiac vs. (8) Bentley ====
March 10	Quinnipiac	9 – 2	Bentley	Northford Ice Pavilion
Matt Erhart - 03:09; Chris Cerrella - 06:49; Ryan Olson - GW PP - 16:27; Todd Bennett - 17:27		First period	11:58 - PP - Steve Tobio; 17:49 - Andy Peters
No scoring		Second period	No scoring
Dan Ennis - PP - 08:05; Ryan Olson - 09:03; Kris Cumming - 16:11; Todd Bennett - 17:20; Brian Herbert - 18:33		Third period	No scoring
J.C. Wells ( 17 saves / 19 shots )		Goalie stats	Joe Cullen ( 40 saves / 49 shots )

==== (2) Mercyhurst vs. (7) Holy Cross ====
March 11	Mercyhurst	10 – 3	Holy Cross	Mercyhurst Ice Center
Tom McMonagle - 03:40; Tom McMonagle - 07:01		First period	15:31 - PP - Patrick Rissmiller
Louis Goulet - 00:21; Jody Robinson - GW - 02:17; Louis Goulet - PP - 06:19; Paul Hiscock - 06:59; Kelly Kochman - 08:48; Paul Hiscock - 15:56		Second period	15:32 - Brian Askashian
Jody Robinson - 08:14; Fedor Zakuslio - 08:26		Third period	13:55 - Chris Fattey
Ashley Stevens ( 24 saves / 27 shots )		Goalie stats	Dan Bennett ( 17 saves / 25 shots ) / Matt Smith ( 8 saves / 8 shots ) / John Tocco ( 1 saves / 3 shots )

==== (3) Canisius vs. (6) Iona ====
March 11	Canisius	3 – 4	Iona	Buffalo State Sports Arena
Paul Dusza - 01:33; Corey Lucas - 16:11		First period	05:02 - Chris Baboulis; 16:43 - John Gilbert
Robert Othmann - 06:34		Second period	No scoring
No scoring		Third period	01:51 - Ryan Manitowich; 13:15 - GW - Ryan Carter
Sean Weaver ( 30 saves / 34 shots )		Goalie stats	Mike Fraser ( 28 saves / 31 shots )

==== (4) Connecticut vs. (5) Sacred Heart ====
March 11	Connecticut	5 – 4	Sacred Heart	UConn Ice Arena
Michael Narotski - 00:37		First period	09:02 - PP - Les Hrapchak; 13:21 - Nick Nutcher; 18:03 - Lloyd Tennant
Mike Anderson - 01:37		Second period	00:54 - Nick Nutcher
Eric Goclowski - 01:37; Trent Landry - 05:02; Michael Goldkind - GW - 14:21		Third period	No scoring
Marc Senerchia ( 17 saves / 21 shots )		Goalie stats	Alexis Jutras-Binet ( 24 saves / 29 shots )

=== Semifinals ===
==== (1) Quinnipiac vs. (6) Iona ====
March 16	Quinnipiac	4 – 6	Iona	UConn Ice Arena
No Scoring		First period	06:35 - Nathan Lutz; 10:53 - John Gilbert; 13:39 - Brian Schroeder
Shawn Mansoff - PP - 05:59; Chris Cerrella - PP - 11:47		Second period	01:33 - PP - Ryan Carter
Chris Cerrella - 03:57; Ryan Olson - 16:58		Third period	07:13 - GW - Mark Hallam; 19:58 - EN - Ryan Carter
J.C. Wells ( 4 saves / 8 shots ) / Dan LiLeo ( 16 saves / 17 shots )		Goalie stats	Mike Fraser ( 26 saves / 30 shots )

==== (2) Mercyhurst vs. (4) Connecticut ====
March 16	Mercyhurst	0 – 2	Connecticut	UConn Ice Arena
No Scoring		First period	No scoring
No scoring		Second period	05:19 - GW - Kevin Connell
No scoring		Third period	07:30 - Michael Goldkind
Peter Aubry ( 20 saves / 22 shots )		Goalie stats	Marc Senerchia ( 37 saves / 37 shots )

=== Championship ===
==== (4) Connecticut vs. (6) Iona ====
March 18	Connecticut	6 – 1	Iona	UConn Ice Arena
Michael Narotski - PP - 07:11		First period	05:08 - Jean-Paul Chaput
Michael Goldkind - GW - 01:00; Ciro Longobardi - PP - 11:29; Trent Landry - 14:58		Second period	No scoring
Ciro Longobardi - 04:35; Evan Stensrud - 18:40		Third period	No scoring
Marc Senerchia ( 27 saves / 29 shots )		Goalie stats	Mike Fraser ( 11 saves / 16 shots ) / Ben Brady ( 7 saves / 8 shots )

== Tournament awards ==
=== MVP ===
- Marc Senerchia (Connecticut)
