= Tom Fenton (ice hockey) =

- Born: April 21, 1984 (age 40); Sarnia, Ontario, Canada
- Height: 6 ft 0 in (183 cm)
- Weight: 180 lb (82 kg; 12 st 12 lb)
- Position: Goaltender
- Shot: Right
- Playing career: 2005–2010

Tom Fenton (born April 21, 1984) is a Canadian former ice hockey goaltender who played junior league hockey with Brad Staubitz, Sam Gagner, and John Tavares and later for American International College of the National Collegiate Athletic Association (NCAA) from 2005 to 2009. In December 2005, as a freshman, he was named by Atlantic Hockey as "Rookie of the Week" twice and once in January 2006 as "Goalie of the Week" after a seven-game stretch where he allowed just 16 goals on 244 shots for a .934 save percentage. He was named "Rookie of the Week" again by Atlantic Hockey on January 12, 2006. Beginning in February 2007, the team went 0-20-3 and Fenton was benched, finally returning to the starting position in February 2009 as a senior and helping AIC win.

On December 16, 2010, the graduate student, head of hockey game operations and community relations and hockey coach at Manhattanville College, he was signed for one game as an emergency backup goaltender for the Phoenix Coyotes of the National Hockey League (NHL) after the team's normal backup, Ilya Bryzgalov, became ill and could not play. Fenton was getting a haircut when he received a phone call asking him to suit up; he initially believed the call to be a prank. His assigned uniform number was 35, but he used his old college mask with number 30.
