= 2007 Atlantic Hockey men's ice hockey tournament =

2007 Atlantic Hockey Men's ice hockey tournament
- Dates: March 3–17, 2007
- Teams: 9
- Finals site: Blue Cross Arena; Rochester, New York
- Champions: Air Force (1st title)
- Winning coach: Frank Serratore (1st title)
- MVP: Mike Phillipich (Air Force)
- Atlantic Hockey Men's Ice Hockey Tournaments

The 2007 AHA Men's Ice Hockey Tournament was the 4th Atlantic Hockey Men's Ice Hockey Tournament. It was played between March 3 and March 17, 2007. Opening round games were played at home team campus sites, while the semifinals and championship games were played at the Blue Cross Arena in Rochester, New York. By winning the tournament, Air Force received Atlantic Hockey's automatic bid to the 2007 NCAA Division I Men's Ice Hockey Tournament.

Both Air Force and Rochester joined Atlantic Hockey for the 2006-07 season; however, due to their reclassification from Division III to Division I status, RIT was ineligible for the 2007 conference tournament. Because of this the tournament was returned to the same format it had been in 2004 and 2005, comprising all nine teams. This would be changed the following year when RIT would compete as a full D-I program.

== Format ==
The tournament featured three rounds of play and a play-in game. All games in the tournament are single-elimination. The play-in game consists of the eighth and ninth seeds competing to decide the final qualifier. In the quarterfinals, the first seed plays the winner of the play-in game while the second and seventh seeds, the third and sixth seeds and the fourth and fifth seeds play to determine who advances to the semifinals. of the four remaining teams, the highest and lowest remaining ranked teams play each other with the other two teams facing one another to determine the championship participants. The tournament champion receives an automatic bid to the 2007 NCAA Men's Division I Ice Hockey Tournament.

RIT was ineligible to play in the tournament and all teams were reseeded accordingly.

== Conference standings ==
Note: GP = Games played; W = Wins; L = Losses; T = Ties; PTS = Points; GF = Goals For; GA = Goals Against

2006–07 Atlantic Hockey standings
	Conference							Overall					
	GP	W	L	T	PTS	GF	GA	GP	W	L	T	GF	GA
RIT†^	28	20	7	1	41	116	71	34	21	11	2	132	93
Sacred Heart	28	17	7	4	38	91	74	36	21	11	4	118	99
Army	28	15	8	5	35	82	69	34	17	12	5	94	87
Connecticut	28	15	11	2	32	90	89	36	16	18	2	108	126
Air Force*	28	13	10	5	31	94	70	40	19	16	5	132	107
Holy Cross	28	9	14	5	23	87	94	35	10	20	5	96	123
Bentley	28	11	17	0	22	75	101	35	12	22	1	90	136
Mercyhurst	28	9	15	4	22	98	106	35	9	20	6	114	134
Canisius	28	9	16	3	21	76	95	35	9	23	3	86	130
American International	28	7	20	1	15	68	108	34	8	25	1	74	134
Championship: Air Force † indicates conference regular season champion * indicates conference tournament champion^ RIT was ineligible for the postseason Final rankings: USA Today/USA Hockey Magazine Top 15 Poll

== Bracket ==
Teams are reseeded after the Quarterfinals

Play-In; March 3
8	Canisius	1
9	American International	2

Quarterfinals; March 10
1	Sacred Heart	4
8	American International	0
2	Army	6
7	Bentley	2
3	Connecticut	5
6	Mercyhurst	4
4	Air Force	3
5	Holy Cross	0

Semifinals; March 16
1	Sacred Heart	4
4	Air Force	5*
2	Army	3
3	Connecticut	1

Championship; March 17
4	Air Force	6
2	Army	1

Note: * denotes overtime period(s)

=== Play-in ===
==== (8) Canisius vs. (9) American International ====
March 3	Canisius	1 – 2	American International	Buffalo State Sports Arena	Recap
(Kasch, Hudson) Jason Weeks - PP - 16:13		First period	No scoring
No scoring		Second period	03:44 - Mark Pavli (Tendler, Fuqua)
No scoring		Third period	12:25 - GW - Mike McMillan (Richardson, Turco)
( 26 saves / 28 shots ) Andrew Loewen		Goalie stats	Tom Fenton ( 28 saves / 29 shots )

=== Quarterfinals ===
==== (1) Sacred Heart vs. (9) American International ====
March 10	Sacred Heart	4 – 0	American International	Milford Ice Pavilion	Recap
(Ferraro, Boisvert) Nick Johnson - GW - 07:08		First period	No scoring
(O'Brien, Grimson) Bear Trapp - PP - 05:00		Second period	No scoring
(O'Brien, Grimson) Kyle Tyll - 09:06 (Ferraro, Johnson) Bear Trapp - 14:15		Third period	No scoring
( 16 saves / 16 shots ) Jason Smith		Goalie stats	Tom Fenton ( 24 saves / 28 shots )

==== (2) Army vs. (7) Bentley ====
March 10	Mercyhurst	6 – 2	Canisius	Tate Rink	Recap
(Bickley, Hollweg) Tim Manthey - PP - 12:39		First period	11:46 - Kane Osmars (Pellarin, Olson)
(Bickley, McKelvie) Tim Manthey - PP - 03:37 (Meyer, Flicek) Bryce Hollweg - GW - 05:20 (Fearing) Lyle Gal - 09:44 (McDougall, Rowe) Jeff Fearing - 17:42		Second period	No scoring
Bryce Hollweg - EN SH - 18:07		Third period	06:57 - Dain Prewitt
( 30 saves / 32 shots ) Josh Kassel		Goalie stats	Ray Jean ( 30 saves / 35 shots )

==== (3) Connecticut vs. (6) Mercyhurst ====
March 10	Connecticut	5 – 4	Mercyhurst	UConn Ice Arena	Recap
(Scherer, Stewart) William Crum - PP - 10:20 (Solberg) Michael Coppola - 11:59 (Schneider, Stewart) Matt Scherer - 12:41		First period	No scoring
Brendan Olinyk - 16:44		Second period	03:48 - Scott Champagne (Cottreau); 12:32 - Cody Collins (Gourgon, Fennell)
(Stewart, Burns) William Crum - GW PP - 04:43		Third period	11:40 - Matt Pierce (Warren, Medernach); 18:18 - Ryan Toomey (Collins, Phillips)
( 32 saves / 36 shots ) Beau Erickson		Goalie stats	Jordan Wakefield ( 31 saves / 36 shots )

==== (4) Air Force vs. (5) Holy Cross ====
March 10	Air Force	3 – 0	Holy Cross	Cadet Ice Arena	Recap
(Schiavone, Charbonneau) Theo Zacour - GW - 15:24		First period	No scoring
No scoring		Second period	No scoring
(Ehn) Mike Phillipich - 05:25 (Ehn, Phillipich) Greg Flynn - PP - 18:21		Third period	No scoring
( 17 saves / 17 shots ) Ben Worker		Goalie stats	Charlie Lockwood ( 31 saves / 34 shots )

=== Semifinals ===
==== (1) Sacred Heart vs. (4) Air Force ====
March 16	Sacred Heart	4 – 5	OT	Air Force	Blue Cross Arena	Recap
No Scoring		First period		15:58 - Brett Nylander (Medenwaldt, Fairchild)
(Spencer) Bear Trapp - 07:33		Second period		00:41 - PP - Mike Phillipich (Charbonneau, Ehn); 14:20 - Matt Fairchild (Medenwaldt, Nylander)
(O'Brien, Grimson) Paul Ferraro - PP - 01:18 (Giosa) Dave Jarman - 04:06 (Jarman) Eric Giosa - 07:50		Third period		19:06 - EA - Billy Devoney (Phillipich, Hajner)
No scoring		First overtime period		08:04 - GW - Josh Print (Schaffer, Flynn)
( 29 saves / 34 shots ) Jason Smith		Goalie stats		Ben Worker ( 20 saves / 24 shots )

==== (2) Army vs. (3) Connecticut ====
March 16	Army	3 – 1	Connecticut	Blue Cross Arena	Recap
No Scoring		First period	No scoring
(Hollweg, Bickley) Tim Manthey - PP - 16:42		Second period	11:56 - PP - Chris Myhro (Koidahl, Erickson)
(Meyer, Flicek) Chris Colvin - GW - 05:53 (Manthey, Flicek) Owen Meyer - PP - 16:06		Third period	No scoring
( 33 saves / 34 shots ) Josh Kassel		Goalie stats	Beau Erickson ( 23 saves / 26 shots )

=== Championship ===
==== (2) Army vs. (4) Air Force ====
March 17	Army	1 – 6	Air Force	Blue Cross Arena	Recap
No Scoring		First period	No scoring
No scoring		Second period	04:26 - Mike Phillipich (Ramsey, Ehn); 07:53 - GW PP - Andrew Ramsey (Phillipich, Mayra)
(Meyer, Flicek) Tim Manthey - PP - 12:59		Third period	04:39 - Josh Frider (Flynn, Reese); 09:33 - Josh Frider (Devoney, Zacour); 15:25 - Josh Schaffer (Hajner, Print); 17:15 - PP - Andrew Ramsey (Phillipich, Mayra)
( 21 saves / 27 shots ) Josh Kassel		Goalie stats	Andrew Volkening ( 23 saves / 24 shots )

== Tournament awards ==
=== All-Tournament Team ===
- G Andrew Volkening (Air Force)
- D Tim Manthey (Army)
- F Mike Phillipich* (Air Force)
- F Bryce Hollweg (Army)

* Most Valuable Player(s)
