= 2006 Atlantic Hockey men's ice hockey tournament =

2006 Atlantic Hockey Men's ice hockey tournament
- Dates: March 11–18, 2006
- Teams: 8
- Finals site: Hart Center; Worcester, Massachusetts
- Champions: Holy Cross (2nd title)
- Winning coach: Paul Pearl (2nd title)
- MVP: James Sixsmith (Holy Cross)
- Atlantic Hockey Men's Ice Hockey Tournaments

The 2006 AHA Men's Ice Hockey Tournament was the 3rd Atlantic Hockey Men's Ice Hockey Tournament. It was played between March 11 and March 18, 2006. Opening round games were played at home team campus sites, while the semifinals and championship games were played at the Holy Cross home venue: Hart Center in Worcester, Massachusetts. By winning the tournament, Holy Cross received the Atlantic Hockey Association's automatic bid to the 2006 NCAA Division I Men's Ice Hockey Tournament. This was the final year in which the AHA championship game was played at a non-neutral site.

== Format ==
The tournament featured three rounds of play. All games in the tournament are single-elimination. In the quarterfinals, the first and eighth seeds, the second and seventh seeds, the third and sixth seeds and the fourth and fifth seeds play to determine who advances to the semifinals. of the four remaining teams, the highest and lowest remaining ranked teams play each other with the other two teams facing one another to determine the championship participants. The tournament champion receives an automatic bid to the 2006 NCAA Men's Division I Ice Hockey Tournament.

== Conference standings ==
Note: GP = Games played; W = Wins; L = Losses; T = Ties; PTS = Points; GF = Goals For; GA = Goals Against

2005–06 Atlantic Hockey standings
	Conference							Overall					
	GP	W	L	T	PTS	GF	GA	GP	W	L	T	GF	GA
#14 Holy Cross†*	28	19	7	2	40	98	65	39	27	10	2	130	95
Mercyhurst	28	19	8	1	39	119	87	36	22	13	1	150	118
Sacred Heart	28	18	8	2	38	92	55	35	21	12	2	116	82
Bentley	28	11	12	5	27	75	82	37	15	17	5	94	117
Army	28	10	12	6	26	64	67	36	12	18	6	80	94
Connecticut	28	9	18	1	19	79	106	36	11	23	2	97	136
Canisius	28	8	18	2	18	68	87	35	10	23	2	87	114
American International	28	6	17	5	17	64	110	32	6	21	5	69	129
Championship: Holy Cross † indicates conference regular season champion * indicates conference tournament champion Final rankings: USA Today/USA Hockey Magazine Top 15 Poll

== Bracket ==
Teams are reseeded after the Quarterfinals

Quarterfinals; March 11
1	Holy Cross	3
8	American International	1
3	Sacred Heart	1
6	Connecticut	4
4	Bentley	4**
5	Army	3
2	Mercyhurst	7
7	Canisius	2

Semifinals; March 17
1	Holy Cross	4
6	Connecticut	1
4	Bentley	3**
2	Mercyhurst	2

Championship; March 18
1	Holy Cross	5
4	Bentley	2

Note: * denotes overtime period(s)

=== Quarterfinals ===
==== (1) Holy Cross vs. (8) American International ====
March 11	Holy Cross	3 – 1	American International	Hart Recreation Center	Recap
No Scoring		First period	13:53 - Ryan Robin
Blair Bartlett - 19:12		Second period	No scoring
Matt Burke - GW - 00:50; Jon Landry - 14:11		Third period	No scoring
Tony Quesada ( 20 saves / 21 shots )		Goalie stats	Tom Fenton ( 39 saves / 42 shots )

==== (2) Mercyhurst vs. (7) Canisius ====
March 11	Mercyhurst	7 – 2	Canisius	Mercyhurst Ice Center	Recap
Jamie Hunt - PP - 02:58		First period	PP - 09:20 - Tommy Flikeid
Dave Borrelli - PP - 09:57; Chris Trafford - GW - 15:56		Second period	10:10 - Tommy Flikeid
Ryan Toomey - SH - 00:47; Kyle Gourgon - 02:43; Ryan Toomey - PP - 11:48; Dave Borrelli - EN SH - 17:38		Third period	No scoring
Tyler Small ( 29 saves / 31 shots )		Goalie stats	Dan Griffin ( 38 saves / 44 shots )

==== (3) Sacred Heart vs. (6) Connecticut ====
March 11	Connecticut	4 – 1	Sacred Heart	Milford Ice Pavilion	Recap
Matt Scherer - 05:12; Matt Scherer - GW PP - 13:46		First period	18:38 - Peter Ferraro
Scott McDougall - 05:12		Second period	No scoring
Matt Scherer - EN - 18:54		Third period	No scoring
Brad Smith ( 52 saves / 53 shots )		Goalie stats	Jason Smith ( 16 saves / 19 shots )

==== (4) Bentley vs. (5) Army ====
March 11	Bentley	4 – 3	2OT	Army	John A. Ryan Arena	Recap
Marc Zwicky - 15:26		First period		No scoring
No Scoring		Second period		09:01 - Luke Flicek; 19:18 - Chris Bilec
Dain Prewitt - 01:31; Dain Prewitt - SH - 18:38		Third period		03:48 - Luke Flicek
Brett Murphy - GW - 14:30		Second overtime period		No scoring
Ray Jean ( 35 saves / 38 shots )		Goalie stats		Brad Roberts ( 51 saves / 55 shots )

=== Semifinals ===
==== (1) Holy Cross vs. (6) Connecticut ====
March 17	Holy Cross	4 – 1	Connecticut	Hart Recreation Center	Recap
Tyler McGregor - 03:20		First period	19:47 - Chris Uber
James Sixsmith - GW SH - 05:24; James Sixsmith - PP - 06:59		Second period	No scoring
Pierre Napert-Frenette - 13:31		Third period	No scoring
Tony Quesada ( 37 saves / 38 shots )		Goalie stats	Brad Smith ( 25 saves / 29 shots )

==== (2) Mercyhurst vs. (4) Bentley ====
March 17	Bentley	3 – 2	2OT	Mercyhurst	Hart Recreation Center	Recap
No Scoring		First period		No scoring
No Scoring		Second period		16:55 - Jamie Hunt
Jaye Judd - PP - 02:55; Marc Zwicky - 07:53		Third period		15:37 - Scott Champagne
Jaye Judd - GW - 00:58		Second overtime period		No scoring
Ray Jean ( 37 saves / 39 shots )		Goalie stats		Tyler Small ( 53 saves / 56 shots )

=== Championship ===
==== (1) Holy Cross vs. (4) Bentley ====
March 18	Holy Cross	5 – 2	Bentley	Hart Recreation Center	Recap
Tyler McGregor - PP - 12:14; James Sixsmith - PP - 16:33		First period	12:45 - Dain Prewitt
Pierre Napert-Frenette - GW PP - 02:07; Jon Landry - PP - 12:31; Sean Nappo - 18:41		Second period	12:45 - Jeff Gumaer
No scoring		Third period	No scoring
Tony Quesada ( 30 saves / 32 shots )		Goalie stats	Ray Jean ( 21 saves / 26 shots ) / Geordan Murphy ( 5 saves / 5 shots )

== Tournament awards ==
=== All-Tournament Team ===
- G: Tony Quesada (Holy Cross)
- D: Jaye Judd (Bentley)
- D: Jamie Hunt (Mercyhurst)
- F: Tom Dickhudt (Bentley)
- F: Pierre Napert-Frenette (Holy Cross)
- F: James Sixsmith (Holy Cross)

=== MVP ===
- James Sixsmith (Holy Cross)
