= 2005 Atlantic Hockey men's ice hockey tournament =

Ice hockey tournament

2005 Atlantic Hockey Men's ice hockey tournament
- Dates: March 9–19, 2005
- Teams: 9
- Finals site: Northford Ice Pavilion; Northford, Connecticut
- Champions: Mercyhurst (1st title)
- Winning coach: Rick Gotkin (1st title)
- MVP: Scott Champagne (Mercyhurst)
- Atlantic Hockey Men's Ice Hockey Tournaments

The 2005 AHA Men's Ice Hockey Tournament was the 2nd Atlantic Hockey Men's Ice Hockey Tournament. It was played between March 9 and March 19, 2005. Play-in and quarterfinal games were played at home team campus sites, while the semifinals and championship games were played at the Quinnipiac home venue: Northford Ice Pavilion in Northford, Connecticut. By winning the tournament, Mercyhurst received the Atlantic Hockey Association's automatic bid to the 2005 NCAA Division I Men's Ice Hockey Tournament.

== Format ==
The tournament featured three rounds of play and a play-in game. All games in the tournament are single-elimination. The play-in game consists of the eighth and ninth seeds competing to decide the final qualifier. In the quarterfinals, the first seed plays the winner of the play-in game while the second and seventh seeds, the third and sixth seeds and the fourth and fifth seeds play to determine who advances to the semifinals. of the four remaining teams, the highest and lowest remaining ranked teams play each other with the other two teams facing one another to determine the championship participants. The tournament champion receives an automatic bid to the 2005 NCAA Men's Division I Ice Hockey Tournament.

== Conference standings ==
Note: GP = Games played; W = Wins; L = Losses; T = Ties; PTS = Points; GF = Goals For; GA = Goals Against

2004–05 Atlantic Hockey standings
	Conference							Overall					
	GP	W	L	T	PTS	GF	GA	GP	W	L	T	GF	GA
Quinnipiac†	24	16	6	2	34	96	64	37	21	13	3	120	102
Canisius	24	14	7	3	31	76	62	35	16	15	4	98	98
Mercyhurst*	24	14	7	3	31	86	64	38	18	16	4	124	116
Holy Cross	24	12	7	5	29	76	60	36	16	14	6	108	102
Sacred Heart	24	13	10	1	27	76	73	35	13	21	1	89	128
Connecticut	24	10	12	2	22	64	71	37	11	23	3	90	128
Bentley	24	6	13	5	17	65	83	34	8	20	6	81	125
Army	24	5	16	3	13	47	71	31	7	21	3	60	97
American International	24	4	16	4	12	50	88	31	4	23	4	63	116
Championship: Mercyhurst † indicates conference regular season champion * indicates conference tournament champion Final rankings: USA Today/USA Hockey Magazine Top 15 Poll

== Bracket ==
Teams are reseeded after the Quarterfinals

Play-In; March 9
8	Army	5
9	American International	3

Quarterfinals; March 12
1	Quinnipiac	2
8	Army	0
2	Canisius	2
7	Bentley	4
3	Mercyhurst	7
6	Connecticut	4
4	Holy Cross	4
5	Sacred Heart	2

Semifinals; March 18
1	Quinnipiac	4
7	Bentley	1
3	Mercyhurst	4*
4	Holy Cross	3

Championship; March 19
1	Quinnipiac	2
3	Mercyhurst	3*

Note: * denotes overtime period(s)

=== Play-in ===
==== (8) Army vs. (9) American International ====
March 9	Army	5 – 3	American International	Tate Rink	Recap
Brady Dolim - 08:54		First period	13:37 - CJ McConnell
Aaron Anderson - 08:05		Second period	No scoring
Luke Flicek - 05:30; David Andros - GW PP - 08:54; Luke Flicek - 12:18		Third period	07:31 - CJ McConnell; 16:17 - PP - CJ McConnell
Brad Roberts ( 16 saves / 19 shots )		Goalie stats	Frank Novello ( 28 saves / 33 shots )

=== Quarterfinals ===
==== (1) Quinnipiac vs. (8) Army ====
March 12	Quinnipiac	2 – 0	Army	Northford Ice Pavilion	Recap
No Scoring		First period	No scoring
Ben Nelson - GW - 05:57; Rob Hammel - 17:44		Second period	No scoring
No scoring		Third period	No scoring
Jamie Holden ( 22 saves / 22 shots )		Goalie stats	Brad Roberts ( 25 saves / 27 shots )

==== (2) Canisius vs. (7) Bentley ====
March 12	Canisius	2 – 4	Bentley	Buffalo State Sports Arena	Recap
Jon Durno - 00:21		First period	No scoring
No Scoring		Second period	08:57 - Brendan McCartin
Joe Kitchen - 07:01		Third period	02:54 - PP - Ryan Lessnau; 09:07 - GW - Paul Markarian; 19:11 - EN - Paul Scalisi
Bryan Worosz ( 21 saves / 24 shots )		Goalie stats	Simon St. Pierre ( 28 saves / 30 shots )

==== (3) Mercyhurst vs. (6) Connecticut ====
March 12	Mercyhurst	7 – 4	Connecticut	Mercyhurst Ice Center	Recap
T.J. Kemp - PP - 09:40; Dave Borrelli - PP - 16:29		First period	01:49 - William Magnuson; 01:57 - Chris Uber; 13:16 - PP - William Crum
Ben Cottreau - PP - 09:41; T.J. Kemp - PP - 11:57; David Wrigley - GW - 12:47		Second period	06:12 - William Crum
Rich Hansen - 14:44; Dave Borrelli - EN - 19:34		Third period	No scoring
Mike Ella ( 20 saves / 24 shots )		Goalie stats	Scott Tomes ( 28 saves / 34 shots )

==== (4) Holy Cross vs. (5) Sacred Heart ====
March 12	Holy Cross	4 – 2	Sacred Heart	Hart Center	Recap
Andrew Weber - 10:56; Andrew Weber - 16:00		First period	14:26 - Garrett Larson; 19:39 - PP - Bernie Chmiel
Matt Burke - GW PP - 04:57		Second period	No scoring
Andrew Weber - 03:26		Third period	No scoring
Tony Quesada ( 21 saves / 23 shots )		Goalie stats	Kevin LaPointe ( 24 saves / 28 shots )

=== Semifinals ===
==== (1) Quinnipiac vs. (7) Bentley ====
March 18	Quinnipiac	4 – 1	Bentley	Northford Ice Pavilion	Recap
Matt Craig - PP - 11:00		First period	17:16 - Bryan Goodwin
Jamie Bates - GW - 03:42; Matt Froehlich - 08:22		Second period	No scoring
Matt Froehlich - EN - 08:22		Third period	No scoring
Jamie Holden ( 24 saves / 25 shots )		Goalie stats	Simon St. Pierre ( 29 saves / 32 shots )

==== (3) Mercyhurst vs. (4) Holy Cross ====
March 18	Mercyhurst	4 – 3	OT	Holy Cross	Northford Ice Pavilion	Recap
David Wrigley - 02:45		First period		03:30 - Tyler McGregor
Scott Reynolds - 07:20; Scott Champagne - 08:23		Second period		05:37 - Dale Reinhardt; 18:13 - Andrew McKay
No scoring		Third period		No scoring
Ryan Toomey - GW - 02:03		First overtime period		No scoring
Mike Ella ( 36 saves / 39 shots )		Goalie stats		Tony Quesada ( 32 saves / 36 shots )

=== Championship ===
==== (1) Quinnipiac vs. (3) Mercyhurst ====
March 19	Quinnipiac	2 – 3	OT	Mercyhurst	Northford Ice Pavilion	Recap
No Scoring		First period		No scoring
Aaron Ludwig - 02:06; Matt Craig - 12:27		Second period		05:17 - Dave Borrelli
No Scoring		Third period		14:03 - Erik Johnson
No Scoring		First overtime period		04:56 - GW - Scott Champagne
Jamie Holden ( 34 saves / 37 shots )		Goalie stats		Mike Ella ( 36 saves / 38 shots )

== Tournament awards ==
=== Three Stars of the Tournament ===
- 3 Scott Champagne (Mercyhurst)
- 2 Jamie Holden (Quinnipiac)
- 1 Matt Ella (Mercyhurst)

=== MVP ===
- Scott Champagne (Mercyhurst)
