= 2004 Atlantic Hockey men's ice hockey tournament =

2004 Atlantic Hockey Men's ice hockey tournament
- Dates: March 12–20, 2004
- Teams: 9
- Finals site: Tate Rink; West Point, New York
- Champions: Holy Cross (1st title)
- Winning coach: Paul Pearl (1st title)
- MVP: Greg Kealey (Holy Cross)
- Atlantic Hockey Men's Ice Hockey Tournaments

The 2004 Atlantic Hockey Men's Ice Hockey Tournament was the inaugural Atlantic Hockey Men's Ice Hockey Tournament. It was played between March 12 and March 20, 2004. All games were played at the Tate Rink in West Point, New York, the home venue of the Army Black Knights. By winning the tournament, Holy Cross received the Atlantic Hockey Association's automatic bid to the 2004 NCAA Division I Men's Ice Hockey Tournament, the first appearance in team history.

== Format ==
The tournament featured three rounds of play and a play-in game. All games in the tournament are single-elimination. The play-in game consists of the eighth and ninth seeds competing to decide the final qualifier. In the quarterfinals, the first seed plays the winner of the play-in game while the second and seventh seeds, the third and sixth seeds and the fourth and fifth seeds play to determine who advances to the semifinals. of the four remaining teams, the highest and lowest remaining ranked teams play each other with the other two teams facing one another to determine the championship participants. The tournament champion receives an automatic bid to the 2004 NCAA Men's Division I Ice Hockey Tournament.

== Conference standings ==
Note: GP = Games played; W = Wins; L = Losses; T = Ties; PTS = Points; GF = Goals For; GA = Goals Against

2003–04 Atlantic Hockey standings
	Conference							Overall					
	GP	W	L	T	PTS	GF	GA	GP	W	L	T	GF	GA
Holy Cross†*	24	17	4	3	37	83	54	36	22	10	4	117	89
Mercyhurst	24	16	7	1	33	105	71	36	20	14	2	145	122
Quinnipiac	24	12	6	6	30	67	53	35	15	14	6	87	87
Sacred Heart	24	12	8	4	28	87	68	36	14	17	5	107	114
Connecticut	24	9	10	5	23	89	86	35	12	16	7	115	127
Canisius	24	9	11	4	22	67	73	34	10	16	8	84	107
Bentley	24	7	13	4	18	55	71	32	9	19	4	79	103
Army	24	6	15	3	15	55	84	33	12	18	3	82	107
American International	24	3	17	4	10	49	97	34	5	25	4	71	138
Championship: Holy Cross † indicates conference regular season champion * indicates conference tournament champion Final rankings: USA Today/American Hockey Magazine Poll Top 15 Poll

== Bracket ==
Teams are reseeded after the Quarterfinals

Play-In; March 12
8	Army	3
9	American International	4

Quarterfinals; March 13
1	Holy Cross	5
9	American International	0
3	Quinnipiac	0
6	Canisius	1*
2	Mercyhurst	5
7	Bentley	4
4	Sacred Heart	3
5	Connecticut	0

Semifinals; March 14
1	Holy Cross	4
6	Canisius	1
2	Mercyhurst	2
4	Sacred Heart	3

Championship; March 20
1	Holy Cross	4
4	Sacred Heart	0

Note: * denotes overtime period(s)

=== Play-in ===
==== (8) Army vs. (9) American International ====
March 9	Army	3 – 4	American International	Tate Rink	Recap
(Picone) Jon Boyle - 06:40 (Mayfield, Cruthers) Chris Casey - PP - 08:41		First period	05:47 - Troy Johnston (Walbert, Valdes); 13:28 - Jay Fennessy
No scoring		Second period	10:13 - John Levesque (McConnell, Miller)
(Mayfield, Rudd) Chris Casey - 14:21		Third period	10:10 - GW PP - Guillaume Caron (Walbert)
( 21 saves / 25 shots ) Brad Roberts		Goalie stats	Frank Novello ( 34 saves / 37 shots )

=== Quarterfinals ===
==== (1) Holy Cross vs. (9) American International ====
March 13	Holy Cross	5 – 0	American International	Tate Rink	Recap
(O'Grady, Kealey) Jeff Dams - GW - 07:03		First period	No scoring
(McGregor, Napert-Frenette) Andrew McKay - 19:46		Second period	No scoring
(Dams) Greg Kealey - PP - 01:09 (Sixsmith) Greg Kealey - 06:43; Matt Conway - 13:14		Third period	No scoring
( 28 saves / 28 shots ) Tony Quesada		Goalie stats	Frank Novello ( 44 saves / 49 shots )

==== (2) Mercyhurst vs. (7) Bentley ====
March 13	Mercyhurst	5 – 4	Bentley	Tate Rink	Recap
(Carter, Rynshoven) Adam Tackaberry - 01:41		First period	No scoring
(Hansen, Champagne) T. J. Kemp - 11:31		Second period	03:46 - Paul Markarian (McCartin); 10:24 - Brendan McCartin (Markarian, Lovell); 17:35 - Brendan McCartin (Markarian, Lovell)
(Borrelli, Reynolds) Erik Johnson - 09:24 (Champagne) David Wrigley - EA PP - 15:24 (Wrigley, Kemp) Rich Hansen - GW PP - 16:17		Third period	07:33 - Brendan McCartin (Plattner)
( 14 saves / 17 shots ) Andy Franck / ( 6 saves / 7 shots ) Jordan Wakefield		Goalie stats	Simon St. Pierre ( 26 saves / 31 shots )

==== (3) Quinnipiac vs. (6) Canisius ====
March 13	Quinnipiac	0 – 1	OT	Canisius	Tate Rink	Recap
No Scoring		First period		No scoring
No scoring		Second period		No scoring
No scoring		Third period		No scoring
No scoring		First overtime period		01:37 - GW - Justin Carre
( 30 saves / 31 shots ) Jamie Holden		Goalie stats		Bryan Worosz ( 27 saves / 27 shots )

==== (4) Sacred Heart vs. (5) Connecticut ====
March 12	Sacred Heart	3 – 0	Connecticut	Tate Rink	Recap
(Billinghurst, Chmiel) Peter Giatrelis - GW PP - 04:19		First period	No scoring
No scoring		Second period	No scoring
(Connerty, Chmiel) William Billinghurst - 11:15 (Molinaro) Garrett Larson - EN - 18:17		Third period	No scoring
( 26 saves / 26 shots ) Kevin LaPointe		Goalie stats	Scott Tomes ( 26 saves / 28 shots )

=== Semifinals ===
==== (1) Holy Cross vs. (6) Canisius ====
March 14	Holy Cross	4 – 1	Canisius	Tate Rink	Recap
(Bianchi, Kealey) Jeff Dams - 00:31		First period	No scoring
(Walker, Coskren) Jonas Tomiuck - GW PP - 14:48		Second period	No scoring
(Coskren, Dams) Greg Kealey - PP - 10:27; Greg Kealey - EN SH - 18:52		Third period	06:31 - Rob Martin (Corcoran, Cohen)
( 24 saves / 25 shots ) Tony Quesada		Goalie stats	Bryan Worosz ( 21 saves / 24 shots )

==== (2) Mercyhurst vs. (4) Sacred Heart ====
March 14	Mercyhurst	2 – 3	Sacred Heart	Northford Ice Pavilion	Recap
No Scoring		First period	14:22 - Pierre-Luc O'Brien (Ferraro, Wright)
Kyle Gourgon - 02:55 (Martin, Reynolds) Erik Johnson - SH - 05:33		Second period	04:06 - Konn Hawkes (Larson, Molinaro); 16:48 - Pierre-Luc O'Brien
No scoring		Third period	No scoring
( 27 saves / 30 shots ) Jordan Wakefield		Goalie stats	Kevin LaPointe ( 22 saves / 24 shots )

=== Championship ===
==== (1) Holy Cross vs. (4) Sacred Heart ====
March 20	Holy Cross	4 – 0	Sacred Heart	Tate Rink	Recap
(Napert-Frenette) Andrew McKay - GW - 05:06 (Dams, Sixsmith) Greg Kealey - 09:54		First period	(Coskren, Sixsmith) Jeff Dams - PP - 08:15 (Napert-Frenette, Irving) Andrew McKay - PP - 16:15
No scoring		Second period	No scoring
No scoring		Third period	No scoring
( 28 saves / 28 shots ) Tony Quesada		Goalie stats	Kevin LaPointe ( 29 saves / 33 shots )

== Tournament awards ==
=== All-Tournament Team ===
- G Tony Quesada (Holy Cross)
- D Konn Hawkes (Sacred Heart)
- D R. J. Irving (Holy Cross)
- F Pierre-Luc O'Brien (Sacred Heart)
- F Greg Kealey* (Holy Cross)
- F Jeff Dams (Holy Cross)

* Most Valuable Player(s)
