= Northford Ice Pavilion =

American ice skating complex

Coordinates: 41.3946°N 72.8143°W

- The "NIP"
- Interactive map of Northford Ice Pavilion
- Location: 24 Fire-Lite Plaza, Northford, Connecticut
- Operator: Northford Ice Pavilion LLC
- Capacity: 1,200 (Red Rink)
- Surface: 200×85 feet (3 rinks)

Construction
- Opened: 1999

Tenants
- Connecticut Whale (PHF) (2016–2017); Quinnipiac Bobcats (ECAC Hockey) (1999–2007)

Website
- northfordice.com

Northford Ice Pavilion is an American ice skating complex, located in the Northford area of North Branford, Connecticut. It hosts a number of high school ice hockey teams.

The arena formerly hosted the Connecticut Whale of the Premier Hockey Federation in the 2016–17 season. It also formerly hosted the NCAA Division I program of Quinnipiac Bobcats men's ice hockey, in the era before the TD Banknorth Sports Center was opened.

October 2006 men's hockey game at the Pavilion, between the Quinnipiac Bobcats and the Robert Morris Colonials
