= 2017–18 American International Yellow Jackets men's ice hockey season =

- Conference: 8th Atlantic Hockey
- Home ice: MassMutual Center

Rankings
- USCHO: NR
- USA Today: NR

Record
- Overall: 15–20–4
- Conference: 11–13–4
- Home: 9–7–1
- Road: 6–13–3

Coaches and captains
- Head coach: Eric Lang
- Assistant coaches: Mike Towns; Steve Wiedler
- Captain: Bryant Christian
- Alternate captain(s): Shawn McBride; Hugo Reinhardt

The 2017–18 American International Yellow Jackets men's ice hockey season was the 70th season of play for the program, the 22nd at the Division I level, and the 15th season in the Atlantic Hockey conference. The Yellow Jackets represented American International College and were coached by Eric Lang, in his 2nd season.

== Season ==
American International began its second season under Eric Lang rather poorly; the Yellow Jackets won just 1 of their first 9 games and looked destined to compile yet another poor record. However, in mid-November, after making freshman Stefano Durante the starting goaltender, AIC began to improve. While the offense was never strong, it was serviceable for much of the year and an improved defensive effort allowed the Yellow Jackets to start winning game more often. The team was never able to put together a long stretch of wins but, after such a bad start, .500-hockey was a vast improvement.

American International finished the season 8th in the Atlantic Hockey standings, their best result in over a decade. While they possessed a losing record, AIC managed to earn its first home playoff game since 1990. While they got a fight from Niagara, the Yellow Jackets won both games to win a postseason series for the first time in eleven years.

The 15 wins recorded on the year were the most in any one season by the program since it had joined Division I in 1999. The sizable improvement for the team was spearheaded by the addition of Brennan Kapcheck and Stefano Durante, two freshman that the program would conceivably be able to build around for the near future.

== Departures ==
Player	Position	Nationality	Cause
Marc Dubeau	Forward	Canada	Left program (retired)
Carson Grolla	Defenseman	Canada	Graduation (signed with Rosetown Red Wings)
Justin Ketola	Goaltender	United States	Transferred to Endicott
Daniel Mele	Forward	United States	Left program (retired)
Johnny Mueller	Defenseman	United States	Transferred to Wisconsin–Eau Claire
Austin Orszulak	Forward	United States	Graduation (signed with Adirondack Thunder)
Billy Vizzo	Forward	United States	Transferred to Endicott

== Recruiting ==
Player	Position	Nationality	Age	Notes
Justin Cole	Forward	United States	21	Bryn Athyn, PA; red shirt
Darius Davidson	Forward	Canada	21	Surrey, BC
Chris Dodero	Forward	United States	21	West Chicago, IL
Stefano Durante	Goaltender	Canada	21	Brampton, ON
Tobias Fladeby	Forward	Norway	21	Asker, NOR
Brennan Kapcheck	Defenseman	United States	20	Mt. Prospect, IL
Luka Maver	Forward	Slovenia	19	Ljubljana, SLO; red shirt
Vitaliy Novytskyy	Defenseman	Ukraine	21	Kharkiv, UKR
Ryan Papa	Forward	United States	23	Prospect Heights, IL; graduate transfer from St. Cloud State
Oskar Strömberg	Defenseman	Sweden	20	Sollentuna, SWE

== Roster ==
No.	Nat.	Player	Class	Pos	Height	Weight	DoB	Hometown	Previous team	NHL rights
1	(Sweden)	Zackarias Skog	Sophomore	G	6' 4" (1.93 m)	200 lb (91 kg)	1995-06-27	Gothenburg, Sweden	Omaha Lancers (USHL)	—
2	(United States)	Nicolas Luka	Sophomore	D	5' 11" (1.8 m)	175 lb (79 kg)	1995-08-18	Bartlett, Illinois	Coulee Region Chill (NAHL)	—
3	(Czech Republic)	Patrik Demel	Sophomore	D	5' 11" (1.8 m)	185 lb (84 kg)	1995-11-28	Ostrava, Czech Republic	Bismarck Bobcats (NAHL)	—
4	(United States)	Dominic Racobaldo	Senior (RS)	D	6' 3" (1.91 m)	220 lb (100 kg)	1992-06-03	Pennsauken, New Jersey	Omaha Lancers (USHL)	—
5	(United States)	Ryan Polin	Junior	D	5' 11" (1.8 m)	194 lb (88 kg)	1994-12-05	Fairbanks, Alaska	Topeka Roadrunners (NAHL)	—
6	(Ukraine)	Vitaliy Novytskyy	Freshman	D	6' 3" (1.91 m)	216 lb (98 kg)	1997-05-07	Kharkiv, Ukraine	Sioux Falls Stampede (USHL)	—
7	(Sweden)	Oskar Strömberg	Freshman	D	6' 7" (2.01 m)	230 lb (104 kg)	1996-11-26	Sollentuna, Sweden	New Jersey Titans (NAHL)	—
8	(United States)	Brennan Kapcheck	Freshman	D	5' 9" (1.75 m)	170 lb (77 kg)	1996-11-17	Mount Prospect, Illinois	Aston Rebels (NAHL)	—
9	(United States)	Ryan Papa	Graduate	F	5' 6" (1.68 m)	181 lb (82 kg)	1994-01-16	Prospect Heights, Illinois	St. Cloud State Huskies (NCHC)	—
10	(Sweden)	Martin Mellberg	Sophomore	F	6' 1" (1.85 m)	183 lb (83 kg)	1995-09-17	Stockholm, Sweden	Lone Star Brahmas (NAHL)	—
11	(United States)	Bryant Christian (C)	Senior	F	5' 10" (1.78 m)	176 lb (80 kg)	1993-06-10	Moorhead, Minnesota	Prince George Spruce Kings (BCHL)	—
12	(United States)	Johno May	Senior	F	6' 5" (1.96 m)	205 lb (93 kg)	1993-10-16	Mahtomedi, Minnesota	Minnesota Wilderness (NAHL)	—
13	(Sweden)	Hugo Reinhardt (A)	Sophomore	F	5' 11" (1.8 m)	200 lb (91 kg)	1996-04-06	Kungsbacka, Sweden	Fargo Force (USHL)	—
14	(United States)	Jared Pike	Sophomore	F	6' 4" (1.93 m)	215 lb (98 kg)	1995-12-31	Sandy, Utah	Bismarck Bobcats (NAHL)	—
15	(Canada)	Jackson Dudley	Senior	F	5' 9" (1.75 m)	161 lb (73 kg)	1993-12-17	Edmonton, Alberta	Bonnyville Pontiacs (AJHL)	—
16	(Canada)	Kyle Stephan	Sophomore	F	6' 2" (1.88 m)	190 lb (86 kg)	1995-02-20	Banff, Alberta	Wenatchee Wild (BCHL)	—
17	(United States)	Chris Dodero	Freshman	F	5' 9" (1.75 m)	176 lb (80 kg)	1996-06-08	West Chicago, Illinois	Janesville Jets (NAHL)	—
18	(United States)	Blake Christensen	Sophomore	F	5' 9" (1.75 m)	180 lb (82 kg)	1995-09-15	Coral Springs, Florida	Wenatchee Wild (BCHL)	—
19	(Canada)	Darius Davidson	Freshman	F	6' 1" (1.85 m)	205 lb (93 kg)	1996-01-24	Surrey, British Columbia	Surrey Eagles (BCHL)	—
20	(Norway)	Tobias Fladeby	Freshman	F	6' 0" (1.83 m)	191 lb (87 kg)	1996-05-20	Asker, Norway	Bismarck Bobcats (NAHL)	—
21	(United States)	Justin Cole	Freshman	F	6' 3" (1.91 m)	205 lb (93 kg)	1996-05-01	Bryn Athyn, Pennsylvania	Cedar Rapids RoughRiders (USHL)	—
22	(Czech Republic)	Dominik Florián	Sophomore	F	6' 4" (1.93 m)	201 lb (91 kg)	1995-05-12	Vlašim, Czech Republic	Coulee Region Chill (NAHL)	—
23	(United States)	Andrew DeBrincat	Senior	D	5' 7" (1.7 m)	161 lb (73 kg)	1993-07-21	Farmington Hills, Michigan	New Jersey Hitmen (USPHL)	—
24	(Canada)	Joel Kocur	Sophomore	F	6' 1" (1.85 m)	188 lb (85 kg)	1995-09-18	Edson, Alberta	Flin Flon (SJHL)	—
25	(Slovenia)	Luka Maver	Freshman	F	6' 3" (1.91 m)	195 lb (88 kg)	1997-10-25	Ljubljana, Slovenia	Lincoln Stars (USHL)	—
27	(Latvia)	Jānis Jaks	Sophomore	D	6' 0" (1.83 m)	190 lb (86 kg)	1995-08-22	Iecava, Latvia	Minnesota Wilderness (NAHL)	—
29	(Canada)	Shawn McBride (A)	Junior	F/D	6' 2" (1.88 m)	201 lb (91 kg)	1995-08-23	Victoria, British Columbia	Victoria Grizzlies (BCHL)	—
30	(Canada)	Stefano Durante	Freshman	G	6' 0" (1.83 m)	170 lb (77 kg)	1996-06-04	Brampton, Ontario	Cobourg Cougars (OJHL)	—
33	(Canada)	Alex Murray	Junior	G	6' 0" (1.83 m)	194 lb (88 kg)	1993-06-29	Burlington, Ontario	Prince George Spruce Kings (BCHL)	—

== Standings ==
2017–18 Atlantic Hockey men's standings
	Conference record							Overall record					
	GP	W	L	T	PTS	GF	GA	GP	W	L	T	GF	GA
Mercyhurst†	28	16	8	4	36	90	81	37	21	12	4	124	111
Canisius	28	17	11	0	34	94	76	38	19	17	2	117	108
Holy Cross	28	12	10	6	30	80	70	36	13	16	7	97	100
Army	28	12	10	6	30	80	70	36	15	15	6	93	91
#14 Air Force *	28	13	11	4	30	73	64	43	23	15	5	115	94
RIT	28	13	14	1	27	91	90	37	15	20	2	114	127
Robert Morris	28	12	13	3	27	79	78	41	18	20	3	119	118
American International	28	11	13	4	26	63	75	39	15	20	4	88	116
Niagara	28	10	15	3	23	76	90	36	11	22	3	93	123
Bentley	28	9	14	5	23	72	87	37	13	18	6	96	114
Sacred Heart	28	9	15	4	22	79	96	39	13	22	4	107	135
Championship: March 17, 2018 † indicates conference regular season champion * indicates conference tournament champion (Riley Trophy); Rankings: USCHO.com Top 20 Poll; updated March 5, 2018

== Schedule and results ==
Date	Time	Opponent^{#}	Rank^{#}	Site	TV	Decision	Result	Attendance	Record
Regular season
October 6	7:05 PM	vs. Army		MassMutual Center • Springfield, Massachusetts		Skog	L 1–5	716	0–1–0 (0–1–0)
October 7	7:05 PM	vs. Army		MassMutual Center • Springfield, Massachusetts		Skog	L 1–2	848	0–2–0 (0–2–0)
October 10	7:05 PM	at Bentley		John A. Ryan Arena • Waltham, Massachusetts		Skog	T 3–3 ^{OT}	456	0–2–1 (0–2–1)
October 13	7:05 PM	vs. Connecticut*		MassMutual Center • Springfield, Massachusetts		Skog	L 4–6	527	0–3–1
October 14	7:00 PM	at Massachusetts*		Mullins Center • Amherst, Massachusetts		Murray	L 1–3	3,662	0–4–1
October 19	7:03 PM	at Penn State*		Pegula Ice Arena • University Park, Pennsylvania	BTN	Murray	L 5–7	6,018	0–5–1
October 20	7:07 PM	at Penn State*		Pegula Ice Arena • University Park, Pennsylvania		Skog	W 3–2 ^{OT}	6,149	1–5–1
October 24	7:05 PM	vs. Bentley		MassMutual Center • Springfield, Massachusetts		Skog	T 2–2 ^{OT}	547	1–5–2 (0–2–2)
November 3	7:05 PM	at RIT		Gene Polisseni Center • Henrietta, New York		Durante	L 3–5	3,455	1–6–2 (0–3–2)
November 4	7:05 PM	at RIT		Gene Polisseni Center • Henrietta, New York		Durante	W 3–2 ^{OT}	2,242	2–6–2 (1–3–2)
November 10	7:05 PM	vs. Sacred Heart		MassMutual Center • Springfield, Massachusetts		Durante	W 6–2	472	3–6–2 (2–3–2)
November 11	2:05 PM	vs. Sacred Heart		MassMutual Center • Springfield, Massachusetts		Durante	W 4–1	307	4–6–2 (3–3–2)
November 17	7:05 PM	at Robert Morris		Colonials Arena • Neville Township, Pennsylvania		Durante	L 1–3	512	4–7–2 (3–4–2)
November 18	4:05 PM	at Robert Morris		Colonials Arena • Neville Township, Pennsylvania		Durante	L 0–4	728	4–8–2 (3–5–2)
November 24	2:05 PM	vs. Niagara		MassMutual Center • Springfield, Massachusetts		Durante	L 1–3	219	4–9–2 (3–6–2)
November 25	7:05 PM	vs. Niagara		MassMutual Center • Springfield, Massachusetts		Murray	W 4–1	247	5–9–2 (4–6–2)
December 1	7:05 PM	vs. Bentley		MassMutual Center • Springfield, Massachusetts		Murray	L 2–6	767	5–10–2 (4–7–2)
December 8	2:05 PM	vs. Mercyhurst		MassMutual Center • Springfield, Massachusetts		Durante	W 3–1	157	6–10–2 (5–7–2)
December 9	2:05 PM	vs. Mercyhurst		MassMutual Center • Springfield, Massachusetts		Durante	L 2–4	317	6–11–2 (5–8–2)
December 30	7:00 PM	at Northeastern		Matthews Arena • Boston, Massachusetts		Durante	L 1–3	1,357	6–12–2
January 5	7:05 PM	vs. Holy Cross		MassMutual Center • Springfield, Massachusetts		Durante	W 2–1	537	7–12–2 (6–8–2)
January 6	7:00 PM	at Holy Cross		Hart Center • Worcester, Massachusetts		Durante	W 4–2	766	8–12–2 (7–8–2)
January 12	7:35 PM	at Canisius		LECOM Harborcenter • Buffalo, New York		Durante	W 4–2	337	9–12–2 (8–8–2)
January 13	7:35 PM	at Canisius		LECOM Harborcenter • Buffalo, New York		Durante	L 1–6	641	9–13–2 (8–9–2)
January 19	7:05 PM	at Mercyhurst		Mercyhurst Ice Center • Erie, Pennsylvania		Durante	L 1–3	1,067	9–14–2 (8–10–2)
January 20	7:05 PM	at Mercyhurst		Mercyhurst Ice Center • Erie, Pennsylvania		Durante	T 4–4 ^{OT}	1,245	9–14–3 (8–10–3)
January 26	2:05 PM	vs. Robert Morris		MassMutual Center • Springfield, Massachusetts		Skog	W 3–1	682	10–14–3 (9–10–3)
January 27	2:05 PM	vs. Robert Morris		MassMutual Center • Springfield, Massachusetts		Durante	L 3–5	1,310	10–15–3 (9–11–3)
February 2	9:05 PM	at Air Force		Cadet Ice Arena • Colorado Springs, Colorado		Skog	L 0–3	2,236	10–16–3 (9–12–3)
February 3	7:05 PM	at Air Force		Cadet Ice Arena • Colorado Springs, Colorado		Durante	T 2–2 ^{OT}	2,153	10–16–4 (9–12–4)
February 6	7:00 PM	at Massachusetts–Lowell*		Tsongas Center • Lowell, Massachusetts		Murray	L 0–4	3,642	10–17–4
February 17	2:05 PM	vs. Holy Cross		MassMutual Center • Springfield, Massachusetts		Durante	W 1–0	2,176	11–17–4 (10–12–4)
February 22	7:05 PM	at Holy Cross		Hart Center • Worcester, Massachusetts		Durante	L 0–2	1,026	11–18–4 (10–13–4)
February 24	7:05 PM	at Bentley		John A. Ryan Arena • Waltham, Massachusetts		Durante	W 3–2	2,207	12–18–4 (11–13–4)
Atlantic Hockey Tournament
March 2	1:05 PM	vs. Niagara*		MassMutual Center • Springfield, Massachusetts (Atlantic Hockey First Round game 1)		Durante	W 4–1	648	13–18–4
March 3	1:05 PM	vs. Niagara*		MassMutual Center • Springfield, Massachusetts (Atlantic Hockey First Round game 2)		Durante	W 4–3 ^{2OT}	1,134	14–18–4
American International Won Series 2–0
March 9	7:35 PM	at Canisius*		LECOM Harborcenter • Buffalo, New York (Atlantic Hockey Quarterfinal game 1)		Durante	L 1–8	727	14–19–4
March 10	8:05 PM	at Canisius*		LECOM Harborcenter • Buffalo, New York (Atlantic Hockey Quarterfinal game 2)		Durante	W 2–1 ^{OT}	752	15–19–4
March 11	7:05 PM	at Canisius*		LECOM Harborcenter • Buffalo, New York (Atlantic Hockey Quarterfinal game 3)		Durante	L 0–3	421	15–20–4
American International Lost Series 1–2
*Non-conference game. ^{#}Rankings from USCHO.com Poll. All times are in Eastern Time. Source:

== Scoring statistics ==
Name	Position	Games	Goals	Assists	Points	PIM
Brennan Kapcheck	D	39	7	19	26	24
Blake Christensen	LW	34	13	10	23	50
Jānis Jaks	D	37	8	15	23	20
Hugo Reinhardt	C	39	7	12	19	44
Martin Mellberg	RW	39	4	14	18	28
Jared Pike	C	39	11	6	17	23
Joel Kocur	C/LW	39	4	9	13	26
Andrew DeBrincat	D	37	1	12	13	8
Darius Davidson	F	34	6	6	12	6
Nicholas Luka	D	36	3	8	11	20
Shawn McBride	C/D	38	7	3	10	4
Patrik Demel	D	21	3	5	8	10
Dominik Florián	F	23	4	3	7	18
Tobias Fladeby	LW/RW	32	1	6	7	27
Bryant Christian	F	39	2	4	6	24
Johno May	C/RW	36	3	2	5	14
Kyle Stephan	RW	27	2	3	5	6
Ryan Polin	D	31	0	5	5	16
Dominic Racobaldo	D	25	1	3	4	12
Jackson Dudley	LW	24	0	4	4	4
Vitaly Novytskyy	D	16	1	0	1	6
Chris Dodero	C/LW	11	0	1	1	4
Ryan Papa	LW	1	0	0	0	0
Oskar Strömberg	D	5	0	0	0	5
Alex Murray	G	6	0	0	0	0
Zacharias Skog	G	9	0	0	0	0
Stefano Durante	G	28	0	0	0	0
Bench	-	-	-	-	-	10
Total			88	150	238	409

== Goaltending statistics ==
Name	Games	Minutes	Wins	Losses	Ties	Goals against	Saves	Shut outs	SV %	GAA
Stefano Durante	28	1585	12	12	2	20	611	2	.911	2.27
Zacharias Skog	9	510	2	4	2	26	200	0	.885	3.06
Alex Murray	6	276	1	4	0	22	124	0	.849	4.77
Empty Net	-	30	-	-	-	8	-	-	-	-
Total	39	2402	15	20	4	116	935	2	.890	2.90

== Rankings ==
Poll	Week																									
Poll	Pre	1	2	3	4	5	6	7	8	9	10	11	12	13	14	15	16	17	18	19	20	21	22	23	24	25 (Final)
USCHO.com	NR	NR	NR	NR	NR	NR	NR	NR	NR	NR	NR	NR	NR	NR	NR	NR	NR	NR	NR	NR	NR	NR	NR	NR	-	NR
USA Today	NR	NR	NR	NR	NR	NR	NR	NR	NR	NR	NR	NR	NR	NR	NR	NR	NR	NR	NR	NR	NR	NR	NR	NR	NR	NR

USCHO did not release a poll in Week 24.

== Awards and honors ==
Player	Award	Ref
Brennan Kapcheck	Atlantic Hockey Rookie of the Year	
Jānis Jaks	Atlantic Hockey Third Team	
Brennan Kapcheck	Atlantic Hockey Rookie Team	
Stefano Durante	Atlantic Hockey Rookie Team	
