= 2018–19 American International Yellow Jackets men's ice hockey season =

Atlantic Hockey, Champion Atlantic Hockey Tournament, Champion NCAA Tournament, West Regional final
- Conference: 1st Atlantic Hockey
- Home ice: MassMutual Center

Rankings
- USCHO: 16
- USA Today: NR

Record
- Overall: 23–17–1
- Conference: 18–9–1
- Home: 11–7–1
- Road: 9–9–0
- Neutral: 3–1–0

Coaches and captains
- Head coach: Eric Lang
- Assistant coaches: Mike Towns; Steve Wiedler; Patrick Tabb
- Captain: Shawn McBride
- Alternate captain(s): Joel Kocur; Hugo Reinhardt

The 2018–19 American International Yellow Jackets men's ice hockey season was the 71st season of play for the program, the 23rd at the Division I level, and the 16th season in the Atlantic Hockey conference. The Yellow Jackets represented American International College and were coached by Eric Lang, in his 3rd season.

== Season ==
Fresh off of their best performance since joining Division I in 1999, American International upped the difficulty of their season by scheduling several strong opponents for 2019. They performed well in the season opener against Providence but then went through a bit of a skid as they tried to settle on the team's starting goaltender. By mid-November the team seemed to be stuck in the mud with an inconsistent offense and a porous defense. A stunning series sweep of Air Force, however, seemed to put the Yellow Jackets back on track; Zackarias Skog shut out the Falcons in both games and took full control of the AIC net for the remainder of the season. The team's offense, too, found its footing the same weekend and proved to be much more dependable afterwards.

A 5-game winning streak helped push American International towards the top of the conference standings and the Yellow Jackets looked primed to compile their first winning season in 25 years. The only real trouble for AIC looked to be its performance in non-conference games. A loss to Massachusetts just after new year's was their third strait embarrassing defeat by a team outside of their conference. By all appearances, the Yellow Jackets looked to be able to compete in Atlantic Hockey, but woefully unprepared for the upper echelon of college hockey.

After dropping its second weekend to RIT that year, AIC went on an 8–1 run that propelled them to the top of the standings. Not only did it guarantee the Yellow Jackets a winning record, but it gave them an 8-point cushion for the conference title. While the rest of Atlantic Hockey scrambled to catch up, American International headed off to Arizona and took on the 12th-ranked Sun Devils. While their non-conference losing streak continued, AIC fared far better than they had previously, fighting back from a 3-goal deficit in the second game to force overtime.

After returning home, the teams chasing AIC had made up some ground but not enough. The Yellow Jackets split their final weekend and finished 3 points ahead of second place to take their first Atlantic Hockey crown and the first regular season championship of any kind for the program. While the team was riding high, their placement in the Pairwise ranks left the team with only one way of making the NCAA Tournament; a conference championship.

AIC received a bye into the conference quarterfinal and welcomed Army for its final home games of the year. They got a tough fight from the service academy, but still managed to pull out a win in the series, advancing to a semifinal round for the first time since 1990. Despite facing the 8th-seed in the next round, AIC was pushed to the limit and saw the game go into overtime. Fortunately, the team's leading scorer, Blake Christensen, found the back of the net first and sent American International to the championship game. The match with Niagara was nearly a carbon-copy of the semifinal, with Christensen assisting on the winning goal in overtime. American International, with its first Atlantic Hockey championship, received the conference's automatic bid and was set to play the first NCAA tournament game in its 71-year history.

Entering the tournament, AIC was unsurprisingly ranked as the 16th-and last team in the field. They travelled out to North Dakota to face top-seeded St. Cloud State and weren't expect to amount to much. The game began slow, with both teams only recording 6 shots in the first period, but AIC found itself with a 1–0 lead. The Huskies began attacking the Yellow Jacket goal in the second but Skog stood firm and turned aside all shots. Instead, it was American International who scored to double their advantage and as the third began, St. Cloud began to become more frantic. The Huskies cut the lead in half with a power play marker around the mid-point of the period, but that was all that Skog and the defense would allow. Despite firing nearly three times as many shots, St. Cloud went down to defeat in American International's first NCAA tournament game.

When AIC ended up losing the next game, the team ended the season with a first appearance in the NCAA tournament and a victory.

== Departures ==
Player	Position	Nationality	Cause
Andrew DeBrincat	Defenseman	United States	Graduation (signed with Indy Fuel)
Jackson Dudley	Forward	Canada	Graduation (retired)
Dominik Florián	Forward	Czech Republic	Signed professional contract (Coventry Blaze)
Johno May	Forward	United States	Graduation (signed with Greenville Swamp Rabbits)
Alex Murray	Goaltender	Canada	Graduation (signed with Fayetteville Marksmen)
Dominic Racobaldo	Defenseman	United States	Graduation (retired)

== Recruiting ==
Player	Position	Nationality	Age	Notes
Elijiah Barriga	Forward	United States	22	West Covina, CA; transfer from UNLV
Jeff Baum	Defenseman	United States	22	Colleyville, TX; transfer from Providence
Samuel Best	Goaltender	United States	20	Woburn, MA; joined mid-season; redshirt
Eric Otto	Forward	United States	21	Burnsville, MN
Evan Plotnik	Goaltender	United States	21	Capistrano Beach, CA
Parker Revering	Defenseman	United States	21	Alexandria, MN
Matúš Spodniak	Forward	Slovakia	20	Košice, SVK
Jan Štefka	Forward	Czech Republic	21	Olomouc, CZE
Chris Theodore	Forward	Canada	20	Beaconsfield, QC

== Roster ==
No.	Nat.	Player	Class	Pos	Height	Weight	DoB	Hometown	Previous team	NHL rights
1	(United States)	Evan Plotnik	Freshman	G	6' 1" (1.85 m)	174 lb (79 kg)	1997-08-21	Capistrano Beach, California	Melfort Mustangs (SJHL)	—
2	(United States)	Nicolas Luka	Junior	D	5' 11" (1.8 m)	175 lb (79 kg)	1995-08-18	Bartlett, Illinois	Coulee Region Chill (NAHL)	—
3	(Czech Republic)	Patrik Demel	Junior	D	5' 11" (1.8 m)	185 lb (84 kg)	1995-11-28	Ostrava, Czech Republic	Bismarck Bobcats (NAHL)	—
4	(United States)	Jeff Baum	Sophomore	D	5' 11" (1.8 m)	185 lb (84 kg)	1996-06-17	Colleyville, Texas	Providence Friars (HEA)	—
5	(United States)	Ryan Polin	Senior	D	5' 11" (1.8 m)	194 lb (88 kg)	1994-12-05	Fairbanks, Alaska	Topeka Roadrunners (NAHL)	—
6	(Ukraine)	Vitaliy Novytskyy	Sophomore	D	6' 3" (1.91 m)	216 lb (98 kg)	1997-05-07	Kharkiv, Ukraine	Sioux Falls Stampede (USHL)	—
7	(Sweden)	Oskar Strömberg	Sophomore	D	6' 7" (2.01 m)	230 lb (104 kg)	1996-11-26	Sollentuna, Sweden	New Jersey Titans (NAHL)	—
8	(United States)	Brennan Kapcheck	Sophomore	D	5' 9" (1.75 m)	170 lb (77 kg)	1996-11-17	Mount Prospect, Illinois	Aston Rebels (NAHL)	—
9	(United States)	Ryan Papa	Graduate	F	5' 6" (1.68 m)	181 lb (82 kg)	1994-01-16	Prospect Heights, Illinois	St. Cloud State Huskies (NCHC)	—
10	(Sweden)	Martin Mellberg	Junior	F	6' 1" (1.85 m)	183 lb (83 kg)	1995-09-17	Stockholm, Sweden	Lone Star Brahmas (NAHL)	—
11	(Czech Republic)	Jan Štefka	Freshman	F	6' 3" (1.91 m)	194 lb (88 kg)	1997-02-18	Olomouc, Czech Republic	Connecticut Jr. Rangers (NCDC)	—
12	(United States)	Eric Otto	Freshman	F	6' 1" (1.85 m)	175 lb (79 kg)	1997-07-19	Burnsville, Minnesota	Chicago Steel (USHL)	—
13	(Sweden)	Hugo Reinhardt (A)	Junior	F	5' 11" (1.8 m)	200 lb (91 kg)	1996-04-06	Kungsbacka, Sweden	Fargo Force (USHL)	—
14	(United States)	Jared Pike	Junior	F	6' 4" (1.93 m)	215 lb (98 kg)	1995-12-31	Sandy, Utah	Bismarck Bobcats (NAHL)	—
15	(Slovakia)	Matus Spodniak	Freshman	F	5' 11" (1.8 m)	200 lb (91 kg)	1997-12-22	Košice, Slovakia	Ogden Mustangs (WSHL)	—
16	(Canada)	Kyle Stephan	Junior	F	6' 2" (1.88 m)	190 lb (86 kg)	1995-02-20	Banff, Alberta	Wenatchee Wild (BCHL)	—
17	(United States)	Chris Dodero	Sophomore	F	5' 9" (1.75 m)	176 lb (80 kg)	1996-06-08	West Chicago, Illinois	Janesville Jets (NAHL)	—
18	(United States)	Blake Christensen	Junior	F	5' 9" (1.75 m)	180 lb (82 kg)	1995-09-15	Coral Springs, Florida	Wenatchee Wild (BCHL)	—
19	(Canada)	Darius Davidson	Sophomore	F	6' 1" (1.85 m)	205 lb (93 kg)	1996-01-24	Surrey, British Columbia	Surrey Eagles (BCHL)	—
20	(Norway)	Tobias Fladeby	Sophomore	F	6' 0" (1.83 m)	191 lb (87 kg)	1996-05-20	Asker, Norway	Bismarck Bobcats (NAHL)	—
21	(United States)	Justin Cole	Freshman (RS)	F	6' 3" (1.91 m)	205 lb (93 kg)	1996-05-01	Bryn Athyn, Pennsylvania	Cedar Rapids RoughRiders (USHL)	—
22	(United States)	Parker Revering	Freshman	D	6' 1" (1.85 m)	200 lb (91 kg)	1997-01-11	Alexandria, Minnesota	Brookings Blizzard (NAHL)	—
24	(Canada)	Joel Kocur (A)	Junior	F	6' 1" (1.85 m)	188 lb (85 kg)	1995-09-18	Edson, Alberta	Flin Flon (SJHL)	—
25	(Slovenia)	Luka Maver	Freshman (RS)	F	6' 3" (1.91 m)	195 lb (88 kg)	1997-10-25	Ljubljana, Slovenia	Lincoln Stars (USHL)	—
26	(Canada)	Chris Theodore	Freshman	F	5' 7" (1.7 m)	180 lb (82 kg)	1997-10-15	Beaconsfield, Quebec	Cornwall Colts (CCHL)	—
27	(Latvia)	Jānis Jaks	Junior	D	6' 0" (1.83 m)	190 lb (86 kg)	1995-08-22	Iecava, Latvia	Minnesota Wilderness (NAHL)	—
28	(United States)	Elijiah Barriga	Freshman (RS)	F	5' 11" (1.8 m)	193 lb (88 kg)	1996-05-16	West Covina, California	UNLV Rebels (ACHA)	—
29	(Canada)	Shawn McBride (C)	Senior	F/D	6' 2" (1.88 m)	201 lb (91 kg)	1995-08-23	Victoria, British Columbia	Victoria Grizzlies (BCHL)	—
30	(Canada)	Stefano Durante	Sophomore	G	6' 0" (1.83 m)	170 lb (77 kg)	1996-06-04	Brampton, Ontario	Cobourg Cougars (OJHL)	—
33	(Sweden)	Zackarias Skog	Junior	G	6' 4" (1.93 m)	200 lb (91 kg)	1995-06-27	Gothenburg, Sweden	Omaha Lancers (USHL)	—

== Standings ==
2018–19 Atlantic Hockey Standings
	Conference record							Overall record					
	GP	W	L	T	PTS	GF	GA	GP	W	L	T	GF	GA
#16 American International †*	28	18	9	1	37	102	77	41	23	17	1	129	119
Bentley	28	15	9	4	34	94	75	37	17	15	5	113	98
Air Force	28	14	10	4	32	65	63	36	16	15	5	90	92
Sacred Heart	28	14	11	3	31	85	73	37	16	17	4	107	106
RIT	28	13	11	4	30	81	76	38	17	17	4	113	111
Niagara	28	11	12	5	27	94	96	41	17	19	5	127	140
Mercyhurst	28	11	13	4	26	88	94	38	13	20	5	113	134
Robert Morris	28	11	15	2	24	72	78	40	16	22	2	102	127
Holy Cross	28	10	14	4	24	81	89	36	10	21	5	91	112
Army	28	8	13	7	23	71	82	39	12	20	7	94	117
Canisius	28	8	16	4	20	77	107	37	12	20	5	103	133
Championship: March 23, 2019 † indicates conference regular season champion * indicates conference tournament champion (Riley Trophy); Rankings: USCHO.com Top 20 Poll

== Schedule and results ==
Date	Time	Opponent^{#}	Rank^{#}	Site	TV	Decision	Result	Attendance	Record
Regular season
October 6	7:00 PM	at #5 Providence*		Schneider Arena • Providence, Rhode Island		Durante	L 1–3	1,875	0–1–0
October 12	7:05 PM	at Niagara		Dwyer Arena • Lewiston, New York		Skog	L 3–4 ^{OT}	585	0–2–0 (0–1–0)
October 13	7:05 PM	at Niagara		Dwyer Arena • Lewiston, New York		Durante	W 3–1	640	1–2–0 (1–1–0)
October 16	7:05 PM	vs. Bentley		MassMutual Center • Springfield, Massachusetts		Durante	W 5–4 ^{OT}	324	2–2–0 (2–1–0)
October 18	7:05 PM	vs. Bentley		MassMutual Center • Springfield, Massachusetts		Durante	T 4–4 ^{OT}	319	2–2–1 (2–1–1)
October 26	7:05 PM	vs. #20 Quinnipiac*		MassMutual Center • Springfield, Massachusetts		Skog	L 1–4	572	2–3–1
October 27	7:05 PM	at #20 Quinnipiac*		People's United Center • Hamden, Connecticut		Durante	L 2–9	2,893	2–4–1
November 2	7:35 PM	at Canisius		LECOM Harborcenter • Buffalo, New York		Skog	L 2–4	848	2–5–1 (2–2–1)
November 3	7:35 PM	at Canisius		LECOM Harborcenter • Buffalo, New York		Durante	W 6–1	857	3–5–1 (3–2–1)
November 9	7:05 PM	at RIT		Gene Polisseni Center • Henrietta, New York		Durante	L 1–2	4,300	3–6–1 (3–3–1)
November 10	5:05 PM	at RIT		Gene Polisseni Center • Henrietta, New York		Skog	L 2–5	2,264	3–7–1 (3–4–1)
November 16	2:05 PM	vs. Air Force		MassMutual Center • Springfield, Massachusetts		Skog	W 5–0	117	4–7–1 (4–4–1)
November 17	1:05 PM	vs. Air Force		MassMutual Center • Springfield, Massachusetts		Skog	W 4–0	378	5–7–1 (5–4–1)
November 27	7:05 PM	vs. Holy Cross		MassMutual Center • Springfield, Massachusetts		Skog	W 4–3	157	6–7–1 (6–4–1)
December 1	7:05 PM	at Holy Cross		Hart Center • Worcester, Massachusetts		Skog	W 4–2	752	7–7–1 (7–4–1)
December 29	7:05 PM	vs. Robert Morris		MassMutual Center • Springfield, Massachusetts		Skog	W 4–3	552	8–7–1 (8–4–1)
December 30	3:05 PM	vs. Robert Morris		MassMutual Center • Springfield, Massachusetts		Skog	L 1–3	473	8–8–1 (8–5–1)
January 5	2:05 PM	vs. #2 Massachusetts*		MassMutual Center • Springfield, Massachusetts		Skog	L 1–6	3,024	8–9–1
January 8	7:05 PM	at Sacred Heart		Webster Bank Arena • Bridgeport, Connecticut		Skog	W 6–5	152	9–9–1 (9–5–1)
January 11	2:05 PM	vs. RIT		MassMutual Center • Springfield, Massachusetts		Skog	L 3–6	238	9–10–1 (9–6–1)
January 12	1:05 PM	vs. RIT		MassMutual Center • Springfield, Massachusetts		Skog	L 2–3	247	9–11–1 (9–7–1)
January 15	7:05 PM	at Sacred Heart		Webster Bank Arena • Bridgeport, Connecticut		Skog	W 2–1	172	10–11–1 (10–7–1)
January 17	7:05 PM	vs. Holy Cross		MassMutual Center • Springfield, Massachusetts		Skog	W 2–0	476	11–11–1 (11–7–1)
January 19	7:05 PM	at Holy Cross		Hart Center • Worcester, Massachusetts		Skog	W 3–2	350	12–11–1 (12–7–1)
January 25	7:05 PM	at Mercyhurst		Mercyhurst Ice Center • Erie, Pennsylvania		Skog	L 2–4	1,120	12–12–1 (12–8–1)
January 26	7:05 PM	at Mercyhurst		Mercyhurst Ice Center • Erie, Pennsylvania		Skog	W 8–5	2,500	13–12–1 (13–8–1)
February 1	2:05 PM	vs. Niagara		MassMutual Center • Springfield, Massachusetts		Skog	W 6–4	343	14–12–1 (14–8–1)
February 2	1:05 PM	vs. Niagara		MassMutual Center • Springfield, Massachusetts		Skog	W 6–3	448	15–12–1 (15–8–1)
February 8	7:05 PM	at Army		Tate Rink • West Point, New York		Skog	W 3–0	1,813	16–12–1 (16–8–1)
February 9	7:05 PM	at Army		Tate Rink • West Point, New York		Skog	W 5–2	2,482	17–12–1 (17–8–1)
February 15	9:05 PM	at #12 Arizona State*		Oceanside Ice Arena • Tempe, Arizona		Skog	L 1–4	924	17–13–1
February 15	9:05 PM	at #12 Arizona State*		Oceanside Ice Arena • Tempe, Arizona		Skog	L 4–5 ^{OT}	925	17–14–1
February 28	7:05 PM	vs. Sacred Heart		MassMutual Center • Springfield, Massachusetts		Skog	L 2–5	1,243	17–15–1 (17–9–1)
March 2	7:05 PM	vs. Sacred Heart		MassMutual Center • Springfield, Massachusetts		Skog	W 4–1	1,126	18–15–1 (18–9–1)
Atlantic Hockey Tournament
March 15	7:05 PM	vs. Army*		MassMutual Center • Springfield, Massachusetts (Atlantic Hockey Quarterfinal game 1)		Skog	W 4–0	1,074	19–15–1
March 16	7:05 PM	vs. Army*		MassMutual Center • Springfield, Massachusetts (Atlantic Hockey Quarterfinal game 2)		Skog	L 1–2	1,012	19–16–1
March 17	7:05 PM	vs. Army*		MassMutual Center • Springfield, Massachusetts (Atlantic Hockey Quarterfinal game 3)		Skog	W 4–1	682	20–16–1
American International Won Series 2–1
March 22	4:35 PM	vs. Robert Morris*	#19	LECOM Harborcenter • Buffalo, New York (Atlantic Hockey Semifinal)		Skog	W 3–2 ^{OT}	1,800	21–16–1
March 23	7:30 PM	vs. Niagara*	#19	LECOM Harborcenter • Buffalo, New York (Atlantic Hockey Semifinal)		Skog	W 3–2 ^{OT}	1,800	22–16–1
NCAA Tournament
March 29	7:30 PM	vs. #1 St. Cloud State*	#18	Scheels Arena • Fargo, North Dakota (West Regional semifinal)	ESPN3	Skog	W 2–1	4,220	23–16–1
March 30	8:00 PM	vs. #6 Denver*	#18	Scheels Arena • Fargo, North Dakota (West Regional final)	ESPNU	Skog	L 0–3	4,248	23–17–1
*Non-conference game. ^{#}Rankings from USCHO.com Poll. All times are in Eastern Time. Source:

== Scoring statistics ==
Name	Position	Games	Goals	Assists	Points	PIM
Blake Christensen	LW	41	16	31	47	22
Kyle Stephan	RW	37	11	16	27	12
Tobias Fladeby	LW/RW	40	18	8	26	23
Martin Mellberg	RW	41	9	17	26	20
Brennan Kapcheck	D	37	5	20	25	25
Shawn McBride	C/D	41	4	19	23	10
Joel Kocur	C/LW	39	11	10	21	61
Luka Maver	C	41	11	6	17	14
Patrik Demel	D	31	1	16	17	10
Hugo Reinhardt	C	23	7	9	16	18
Justin Cole	F	40	7	8	15	21
Jānis Jaks	D	38	4	10	14	12
Chris Dodero	C/LW	34	3	11	14	8
Nicholas Luka	D	35	0	14	14	14
Chris Theodore	LW	34	6	4	10	12
Ryan Polin	D	36	1	8	9	12
Darius Davidson	F	30	5	3	8	0
Jared Pike	C	36	5	2	7	33
Elijah Barriga	LW	26	2	4	6	31
Jeff Baum	D	26	1	3	4	14
Matúš Spodniak	F	5	1	0	1	0
Jan Štefka	F	20	1	0	1	6
Stefano Durante	G	8	0	1	1	0
Oskar Strömberg	D	11	0	1	1	0
Zacharias Skog	G	35	0	1	1	0
Evan Plotnik	G	2	0	0	0	0
Vitaly Novytskyy	D	10	0	0	0	8
Parker Revering	D	17	0	0	0	21
Bench	-	-	-	-	-	14
Total			129	222	351	421

== Goaltending statistics ==
Name	Games	Minutes	Wins	Losses	Ties	Goals against	Saves	Shut outs	SV %	GAA
Zackarias Skog	35	2060	20	14	0	92	819	5	.899	2.68
Stefano Durante	8	379	3	3	1	20	132	0	.868	3.16
Evan Plotnik	2	13	0	0	0	1	2	0	.667	4.44
Empty Net	-	20	-	-	-	6	-	-	-	-
Total	41	2473	23	17	1	119	953	5	.889	2.89

== Rankings ==
Poll	Week																										
Poll	Pre	1	2	3	4	5	6	7	8	9	10	11	12	13	14	15	16	17	18	19	20	21	22	23	24	25	26 (Final)
USCHO.com	NR	NR	NR	NR	NR	NR	NR	NR	NR	NR	NR	NR	NR	NR	NR	NR	NR	NR	NR	NR	NR	NR	NR	19	18	-	16
USA Today	NR	NR	NR	NR	NR	NR	NR	NR	NR	NR	NR	NR	NR	NR	NR	NR	NR	NR	NR	NR	NR	NR	NR	NR	NR	NR	NR

USCHO did not release a poll in Week 25.

== Awards and honors ==
Player	Award	Ref
Blake Christensen	AHCA East Second Team All-American	
Blake Christensen	Atlantic Hockey Regular season Scoring Trophy	
Eric Lang	Atlantic Hockey Coach of the Year	
Zackarias Skog	Atlantic Hockey Most Valuable Player in Tournament	
Blake Christensen	Atlantic Hockey First Team	
Brennan Kapcheck	Atlantic Hockey First Team	
Blake Christensen	Atlantic Hockey All-Tournament Team	
Hugo Reinhardt	Atlantic Hockey All-Tournament Team	
Jānis Jaks	Atlantic Hockey All-Tournament Team	
Ryan Polin	Atlantic Hockey All-Tournament Team	
Zackarias Skog	Atlantic Hockey All-Tournament Team	
