= 2018 Atlantic Hockey men's ice hockey tournament =

2018 Atlantic Hockey Men's ice hockey tournament
- Dates: March 2–17, 2018
- Teams: 11
- Finals site: Blue Cross Arena; Rochester, New York
- Champions: Air Force (7th title)
- Winning coach: Frank Serratore (7th title)
- MVP: Billy Christopoulos (Air Force)
- Atlantic Hockey Men's Ice Hockey Tournaments

The 2018 Atlantic Hockey Tournament is the 14th Atlantic Hockey Tournament. It was played between March 2 and March 17, 2018 at home campus locations and at the Blue Cross Arena in Rochester, New York. It was the last tournament at Blue Cross Arena before the tournament moved to HarborCenter in Buffalo, New York. By winning the tournament, Air Force earned Atlantic Hockey's automatic bid to the 2018 NCAA Division I Men's Ice Hockey Tournament.

== Format ==
The tournament features four rounds of play. In the first round the sixth and eleventh, seventh and tenth, and eighth and ninth seeds, as determined by the conference regular-season standings, will play a best-of-three series with the winners advancing to the quarterfinals. The top five teams from the conference regular-season standings receive a bye to the quarterfinals. There, the first seed and lowest-ranked first-round winner, the second seed and second-highest-ranked first-round winner, the third seed and highest-ranked first-round winner, and the fourth seed and the fifth seed will play a best-of-three series, with the winners advancing to the semifinals. In the semifinals, the highest and lowest seeds and second-highest and second-lowest remaining seeds will play a single game each, with the winners advancing to the championship game. The tournament champion will receive an automatic bid to the 2018 NCAA Division I Men's Ice Hockey Tournament.

=== Standings ===
Note: GP = Games played; W = Wins; L = Losses; T = Ties; PTS = Points; GF = Goals For; GA = Goals Against

2017–18 Atlantic Hockey men's standings
	Conference record							Overall record					
	GP	W	L	T	PTS	GF	GA	GP	W	L	T	GF	GA
Mercyhurst†	28	16	8	4	36	90	81	37	21	12	4	124	111
Canisius	28	17	11	0	34	94	76	38	19	17	2	117	108
Holy Cross	28	12	10	6	30	80	70	36	13	16	7	97	100
Army	28	12	10	6	30	80	70	36	15	15	6	93	91
#14 Air Force *	28	13	11	4	30	73	64	43	23	15	5	115	94
RIT	28	13	14	1	27	91	90	37	15	20	2	114	127
Robert Morris	28	12	13	3	27	79	78	41	18	20	3	119	118
American International	28	11	13	4	26	63	75	39	15	20	4	88	116
Niagara	28	10	15	3	23	76	90	36	11	22	3	93	123
Bentley	28	9	14	5	23	72	87	37	13	18	6	96	114
Sacred Heart	28	9	15	4	22	79	96	39	13	22	4	107	135
Championship: March 17, 2018 † indicates conference regular season champion * indicates conference tournament champion (Riley Trophy); Rankings: USCHO.com Top 20 Poll; updated March 5, 2018

== Bracket ==
First round March 2–4
6	RIT	5*	3	0
11	Sacred Heart	4	4***	2
7	Robert Morris	3	3	3
10	Bentley	1	4	2
8	American International	4	4**	—
9	Niagara	1	3	—

Quarterfinals; March 9–11
1	Mercyhurst	4	3*	—
11	Sacred Heart	2	2	—
2	Canisius	8	1	3
8	American International	1	2*	0
3	Holy Cross	1	1	—
7	Robert Morris	4	5	—
4	Army	3	1	0
5	Air Force	5	0	1*

Semifinals; March 16
1	Mercyhurst	4
7	Robert Morris	5*
2	Canisius	0
5	Air Force	3

Championship; March 17
7	Robert Morris	1
5	Air Force	5

Note: * denotes overtime period(s)

== Results ==
=== First round ===
==== (6) RIT vs. (11) Sacred Heart ====
March 2	RIT	5 – 4	OT	Sacred Heart	Gene Polisseni Center	Recap
(Powell, Valenzuela) Adam Brubacher – PP – 01:13 (Norrish, Brown) Gabe Valenzuela – PP – 09:11 (Dupuis, Powell) Adam Brubacher – 13:00		First period		No scoring
(Norrish, Powell) Dan Willett – 07:36		Second period		02:47 – Stephen Hladin (Kennedy, Rakhmatov); 04:38 – Matt Tugnutt (Kennedy, Bavaro); 10:55 – Marc Johnstone (McIlmurray, Crocock)
No scoring		Third period		15:53 – Mike Crocock (Hladin, Cotton)
(Brown, Valenzuela) Abbott Girduckis – GW – 00:23		First overtime period		No scoring
( 24 saves / 28 shots ) Logan Drackett		Goalie stats		Brett Magnus ( 28 saves / 33 shots )

March 3	RIT	3 – 4	3OT	Sacred Heart	Gene Polisseni Center	Recap
(Hamacher, Norrish) Myles Powell – 07:04 (Norrish, Brubacher) Myles Powell – PP – 15:06		First period		08:12 – Jackson Barliant (Cotton, Hladin); 15:38 – Marc Johnstone (Tsekos, McIlmurray)
No scoring		Second period		No scoring
(Valenzuela, Girduckis) Erik Brown – 04:29		Third period		18:54 – Austin McIlmurray (Tugnutt, Tsekos)
No scoring		Third overtime period		02:19 – GW – Jackson Barliant (Hladin)
( 28 saves / 32 shots ) Logan Drackett		Goalie stats		Brett Magnus ( 46 saves / 49 shots )

March 4	RIT	0 – 2	Sacred Heart	Gene Polisseni Center	Recap
No scoring		First period	12:06 – GW – Mike Crocock (Tsekos, Johnstone); 19:26 – PP – Austin McIlmurray (Allan, Tsekos)
No scoring		Second period	No scoring
No scoring		Third period	No scoring
( 23 saves / 25 shots ) Logan Drackett		Goalie stats	Brett Magnus ( 32 saves / 32 shots )

Sacred Heart won series 2–1

==== (7) Robert Morris vs. (10) Bentley ====
March 2	Robert Morris	3 – 1	Bentley	84 Lumber Arena	Recap
No scoring		First period	No scoring
(Moore, Ferguson) Alex Tonge – 13:10		Second period	No scoring
(Moore, Dorowicz) Brandon Watt – GW PP – 19:04 (Ferguson) Alex Tonge – EN – 19:56		Third period	19:50 – Kyle Schmidt (Jago, Santerno)
( 37 saves / 38 shots ) Francis Marotte		Goalie stats	Aidan Pelino ( 31 saves / 33 shots )

March 3	Robert Morris	3 – 4	Bentley	84 Lumber Arena	Recap
(Tonge, Moore) Luke Lynch – PP – 01:57		First period	09:58 – Charlie Marchand (Zuffante, DePourcq); 19:34 – Jonathan Desbiens (unassisted)
(Lynch, Graham) Daniel Mantenuto – 10:27 (Lynch) Matthew Graham – 13:56		Second period	No scoring
No scoring		Third period	01:00 – PP – Luke Santerno (Solovyev, Jago); 02:23 – GW PP – Kyle Schmidt (Santerno, Jago)
( 30 saves / 34 shots ) Francis Marotte		Goalie stats	Aidan Pelino ( 29 saves / 32 shots )

March 4	Robert Morris	3 – 2	Bentley	84 Lumber Arena	Recap
(Watt, Dorowicz) Michael Louria – 13:46 (Lynch, Bontje) Alex Tonge – SH – 17:55		First period	18:40 – PP – Kyle Schmidt (Desbiens, Jago)
(Watt) Daniel Mantenuto – GW – 15:18		Second period	10:57 – PP – Charlie Marchand (Desbiens, Jago)
No scoring		Third period	No scoring
( 31 saves / 33 shots ) Francis Marotte		Goalie stats	Aidan Pelino ( 25 saves / 28 shots )

Robert Morris won series 2–1

==== (8) American International vs. (9) Niagara ====
March 2	American International	4 – 1	Niagara	MassMutual Center	Recap
(Polin, Christensen) Darius Davidson – 07:16		First period	No scoring
(Christensen, Jaks) Hugo Reinhardt – GW PP – 12:07		Second period	No scoring
(Jaks, Kapcheck) Hugo Reinhardt – PP – 07:36 (Mellberg, Dudley) Brennan Kapcheck – EN – 17:57		Third period	14:13 – Noah Delmas (unassisted)
( 35 saves / 35 shots ) Stefano Durante		Goalie stats	Brian Wilson ( 18 saves / 21 shots )

March 3	American International	4 – 3	2OT	Niagara	MassMutual Center	Recap
(Debrincat, Reinhardt) Darius Davidson – 19:19		First period		No scoring
(Jaks, Kocur) Shawn McBride – PP – 18:20		Second period		No scoring
(Reinhardt, Christensen) Jared Pike – PP – 11:18		Third period		04:45 – PP – Kris Spriggs (Delmas); 06:01 – Kris Spriggs (Kendall); 14:21 – Derian Plouffe (Cooley)
(Reinhardt, Kapcheck) Blake Christensen – GW PP – 08:02		Second overtime period		No scoring
( 31 saves / 34 shots ) Stefano Durante		Goalie stats		Brian Wilson ( 33 saves / 37 shots )

American International won series 2–0

=== Quarterfinals ===
==== (1) Mercyhurst vs. (11) Sacred Heart ====
March 9	Mercyhurst	4 – 2	Sacred Heart	Mercyhurst Ice Center	Recap
(Enns, Duszak) Jonathan Charbonneau – 09:49		First period	02:35 – PP – Marc Johnstone (Bavaro, Allan)
(Duszak, Best) Jonathan Charbonneau – PP – 05:02 (Lancaster, Wildung) Jonathan Charbonneau – GW – 16:48		Second period	02:35 – Marc Johnstone (Bavaro, Allan)
(Elliot, Baker) Michael Verboom – 04:27		Third period	06:53 – PP – Zach Tsekos (Rakhmatov, Bavaro)
( 27 saves / 29 shots ) Brandon Wildung		Goalie stats	Brett Magnus ( 26 saves / 30 shots )

March 10	Mercyhurst	3 – 2	OT	Sacred Heart	Mercyhurst Ice Center	Recap
No scoring		First period		05:49 – PP – Austin McIlmurray (Tsekos, Allan)
(Duszak, Charbonneau) Tommaso Bucci – 05:38 (Duszak, Lammon) Jonathan Charbonneau – 06:22		Second period		02:42 – Stephen Hladin (Barliant, Cotton)
No scoring		Third period		No scoring
(Duszak, Piacentini) Jonathan Charbonneau – GW PP – 09:39		First overtime period		No scoring
( 35 saves / 37 shots ) Brandon Wildung		Goalie stats		Brett Magnus ( 43 saves / 46 shots )

Mercyhurst won series 2–0

==== (2) Canisius vs. (8) American International ====
March 9	Canisius	8 – 1	American International	HarborCenter	Recap
(Hutchison, Edmondson) Matt McLeod – 08:02 (Hoover, Meyer) Félix Chamberland – GW – 12:05 (Schmelzer, Jaeckle) Dylan McLaughlin – 16:51		First period	No scoring
(Murray) Dylan McLaughlin – 00:27 (Meyer, Chamberland) Matt Hoover – PP – 13:12		Second period	05:41 – Blake Christensen (Debrincat, Luka)
(Hutchison, McLaughlin) Jimmy Mazza – PP – 00:24 (Hutchison, Long) Matt McLeod – SH – 11:39 (Stander, Meyer) Matt Hoover – 13:53		Third period	No scoring
( 34 saves / 35 shots ) Daniel Urbani		Goalie stats	Stefano Durante ( 10 saves / 15 shots ) / Zackarias Skog ( 7 saves / 10 shots )

March 10	Canisius	1 – 2	OT	American International	HarborCenter	Recap
No scoring		First period		04:52 – PP – Jānis Jaks (Kapcheck, Pike)
No scoring		Second period		No scoring
(Meyer, Mazza) Cameron Heath – 02:36		Third period		No scoring
No scoring		First overtime period		02:42 – GW – Shawn McBride (Demel, Pike)
( 44 saves / 46 shots ) Daniel Urbani		Goalie stats		Stefano Durante ( 23 saves / 24 shots )

March 11	Canisius	3 – 0	American International	HarborCenter	Recap
(Stander, Hutchison) Jesse Pereira – GW – 07:37		First period	No scoring
(Stief, Heath) Matt Hoover – PP – 07:01		Second period	No scoring
(McLaughlin) Jeff Murray – 07:31		Third period	No scoring
( 26 saves / 26 shots ) Daniel Urbani		Goalie stats	Stefano Durante ( 17 saves / 20 shots )

Canisius won series 2–1

==== (3) Holy Cross vs. (7) Robert Morris ====
March 9	Holy Cross	1 – 4	Robert Morris	Hart Recreation Center	Recap
No scoring		First period	00:25 – Matthew Graham (Lynch, Mantenuto)
(Trapp, Pooley) T. J. Moore – PP – 00:50		Second period	06:35 – GW PP – Brady Ferguson (Lynch, Israel); 16:25 – Nick Prkusic (Ghantous, Israel)
No scoring		Third period	19:56 – EN – Alex Tonge (Moore)
( 40 saves / 43 shots ) Paul Berrafato		Goalie stats	Francis Marotte ( 39 saves / 40 shots )

March 10	Holy Cross	1 – 5	OT	Robert Morris	Hart Recreation Center	Recap
No scoring		First period		07:08 – PP – Matthew Graham (Lynch, Mantenuto)
No scoring		Second period		04:57 – GW – Timmy Moore (Kapcheck, Pike); 19:46 – PP – Timmy Moore (Lynch, Ferguson)
(Lopez, Coughlin) T. J. Moore – 00:30		Third period		07:10 – PP – Luke Lynch (Ferguson, Tonge); 17:15 – EN – Luke Lynch (unassisted)
( 25 saves / 29 shots ) Paul Berrafato		Goalie stats		Francis Marotte ( 37 saves / 38 shots )

Robert Morris won series 2–0

==== (4) Army vs. (5) Air Force ====
March 9	Army	3 – 5	Air Force	Tate Rink	Recap
(MacAfee, Zimmerman) Dominic Franco – PP – 13:06		First period	11:02 – PP – Evan Giesler (Mirageas, Koch)
(Andrle, Box) Michael Wilson – 08:04		Second period	10:21 – Jordan Himley (Bailey, Boje); 13:29 – Kyle Haak (Mirageas, Kucera)
(unassisted) Brendan Soucie – 07:32		Third period	04:29 – GW – Marshall Bowery (Tomlak); 19:32 – EN – Erik Baskin (Ledford)
( 20 saves / 24 shots ) Cole Bruns		Goalie stats	Billy Christopoulos ( 17 saves / 20 shots )

March 10	Army	1 – 0	Air Force	Tate Rink	Recap
(Franco, Pham) Zach Evancho – GW PP – 08:29		First period	No scoring
No scoring		Second period	No scoring
No scoring		Third period	No scoring
( 33 saves / 33 shots ) Cole Bruns		Goalie stats	Billy Christopoulos ( 17 saves / 18 shots )

March 11	Army	3 – 0	OT	Air Force	Tate Rink	Recap
No scoring		First period		No scoring
No scoring		Second period		No scoring
No scoring		Third period		No scoring
No scoring		First overtime period		06:38 – GW – Tyler Ledford (Baskin)
( 39 saves / 40 shots ) Cole Bruns		Goalie stats		Billy Christopoulos ( 15 saves / 15 shots )

Air Force won series 2–1

=== Semifinals ===
==== (1) Mercyhurst vs. (7) Robert Morris ====
March 16	Mercyhurst	4 – 5	OT	Robert Morris	Blue Cross Arena	Recap
(Barach, Lancaster) Kane Elliot – 19:09		First period		No scoring
No scoring		Second period		04:44 – PP – Brady Ferguson (Israel); 09:03 – Brady Ferguson (Louria, Giles)
(Duszak) Taylor Best – 08:01 (Enns) Derek Barach – 12:08 (Lancaster, Baker) Joseph Duszak – 13:18		Third period		14:31 – Daniel Mantenuto (Graham, Powers); 19:15 – PP – Brady Ferguson (Louria, Lynch)
No scoring		First overtime period		06:42 – Michael Louria (Tonge)
( 37 saves / 42 shots ) Brandon Wildung		Goalie stats		Francis Marotte ( 41 saves / 45 shots )

==== (2) Canisius vs. (5) Air Force ====
March 16	Canisius	0 – 3	Air Force	Blue Cross Arena	Recap
No scoring		First period	No scoring
No scoring		Second period	06:12 – GW PP – Kyle Haak (Mirageas, Himley); 16:13 – Erik Baskin (Levin, Ledford)
No scoring		Third period	05:51 – Matt Serratore (Mirageas, Haak)
( 34 saves / 37 shots ) Daniel Urbani		Goalie stats	Billy Christopoulos ( 24 saves / 24 shots )

=== Championship ===
==== (5) Air Force vs. (7) Robert Morris ====
March 17	Air Force	5 – 1	Robert Morris	Blue Cross Arena	Recap
(Himley, Serratore) Kyle Haak – 02:06 (Tomlak, Sommer) Jonathan Kopacka – GW – 02:56 (Boje) Jordan Himley – PP – 15:34		First period	No scoring
(unassisted) Evan Giesler – 05:07		Second period	15:52 – PP – Nick Prkusic (unassisted)
(Boje, Abood) Kyle Haak – EN – 14:00		Third period	No scoring
( 35 saves / 36 shots ) Billy Christopoulos		Goalie stats	Francis Marotte ( 13 saves / 17 shots ) / Andrew Pikul ( 14 saves / 14 shots )

== Tournament awards ==
=== All-Tournament Team ===
- G Billy Christopoulos* (Air Force)
- D Zack Mirageas (Air Force)
- D Jonathan Kopacka (Air Force)
- F Kyle Haak (Air Force)
- F Jordan Himley (Air Force)
- F Brady Ferguson (Robert Morris)

* Most Valuable Player(s)
