= 2019 Atlantic Hockey men's ice hockey tournament =

2019 Atlantic Hockey Men's ice hockey tournament
- Dates: March 8–23, 2019
- Teams: 11
- Finals site: HarborCenter; Buffalo, New York
- Champions: American International (1st title)
- Winning coach: Eric Lang (1st title)
- MVP: Zackarias Skog (American International)
- Atlantic Hockey Men's Ice Hockey Tournaments

The 2019 Atlantic Hockey Tournament is the 15th Atlantic Hockey Tournament. It was played between March 8 and March 23, 2019, at home campus locations and at the HarborCenter in Buffalo, New York. By winning the tournament, American International earned Atlantic Hockey's automatic bid to the 2019 NCAA Division I Men's Ice Hockey Tournament.

== Format ==
The tournament features four rounds of play. In the first round the sixth and eleventh, seventh and tenth, and eighth and ninth seeds, as determined by the conference regular season standings, will play a best-of-three series with the winners advancing to the quarterfinals. The top five teams from the conference regular season standings receive a bye to the quarterfinals. There, the first seed and lowest-ranked first-round winner, the second seed and second-highest-ranked first-round winner, the third seed and highest-ranked first-round winner, and the fourth seed and the fifth seed will play a best-of-three series, with the winners advancing to the semifinals. In the semifinals, the highest and lowest seeds and second-highest and second-lowest remaining seeds will play a single game each, with the winners advancing to the championship game. The tournament champion will receive an automatic bid to the 2019 NCAA Division I Men's Ice Hockey Tournament.

=== Standings ===
2018–19 Atlantic Hockey Standings
	Conference record							Overall record					
	GP	W	L	T	PTS	GF	GA	GP	W	L	T	GF	GA
#16 American International †*	28	18	9	1	37	102	77	41	23	17	1	129	119
Bentley	28	15	9	4	34	94	75	37	17	15	5	113	98
Air Force	28	14	10	4	32	65	63	36	16	15	5	90	92
Sacred Heart	28	14	11	3	31	85	73	37	16	17	4	107	106
RIT	28	13	11	4	30	81	76	38	17	17	4	113	111
Niagara	28	11	12	5	27	94	96	41	17	19	5	127	140
Mercyhurst	28	11	13	4	26	88	94	38	13	20	5	113	134
Robert Morris	28	11	15	2	24	72	78	40	16	22	2	102	127
Holy Cross	28	10	14	4	24	81	89	36	10	21	5	91	112
Army	28	8	13	7	23	71	82	39	12	20	7	94	117
Canisius	28	8	16	4	20	77	107	37	12	20	5	103	133
Championship: March 23, 2019 † indicates conference regular season champion * indicates conference tournament champion (Riley Trophy); Rankings: USCHO.com Top 20 Poll

== Bracket ==
Teams are reseeded for the quarterfinals and semifinals

First round March 8–10
6	Niagara	5**	3	2
11	Canisius	4	4*	1
7	Mercyhurst	2	1	-
10	Army	3*	5	-
8	Robert Morris	1	3	-
9	Holy Cross	0	2	-

Quarterfinals; March 13–17
1	American International	4	1	4
10	Army	0	2	1
2	Bentley	3	1	3
8	Robert Morris	2	2	4*
3	Air Force	2	4	-
6	Niagara	3*	5	-
4	Sacred Heart	9	3	1
5	RIT	4	7	3

Semifinals; March 22
1	American International	3*
8	Robert Morris	2
5	RIT	0
6	Niagara	1*

Championship; March 23
1	American International	3*
6	Niagara	2

Note: * denotes overtime period(s)

== Results ==
=== First round ===
==== (6) Niagara vs. (11) Canisius ====
March 8	Niagara	5 – 4	2OT	Canisius	Dwyer Arena	Recap
(Cooley, Kendall) Noah Delmas – PP – 13:55 (unassisted) Ben Sokay – PP – 19:20		First period		15:57 – PP – Matt Hoover (McLaughlin)
(Herrmann, Hayes) Johnny Curran – 07:44		Second period		06:53 – Jimmy Mazza (Jerry)
(Brandt) Ben Sokay – EA – 19:48		Third period		00:41 – Jimmy Mazza (Heath, McLaughlin); 15:34 – Mitchell Martan (Heath, Alger)
(Mills) Justin Kendall – GW – 09:53		Second overtime period		No scoring
( 32 saves / 36 shots ) Brian Wilson		Goalie stats		Matt Ladd ( 38 saves / 43 shots )

March 9	Niagara	3 – 4	OT	Canisius	Dwyer Arena	Recap
No scoring		First period		11:25 – PP – Jimmy Mazza (Long, Alger); 15:47 – Matt McLeod (Parrottino, McLaughlin)
(Stenlund) Noah Delmas – PP – 08:01 (Delmas, Cooley) Justin Kendall – PP – 17:26 (Delmas) Ludwig Stenlund – PP – 18:30		Second period		01:52 – PP – Nick Hutchison (Alger, Martan)
No scoring		Third period		No scoring
No scoring		First overtime period		02:04 – GW – Nick Hutchison (Mazza, Chamberland)
( 27 saves / 31 shots ) Brian Wilson		Goalie stats		Matt Ladd ( 27 saves / 30 shots )

March 10	Niagara	2 – 1	Canisius	Dwyer Arena	Recap
No scoring		First period	No scoring
(Truscott) Jared Brandt – 05:53 (Cooley, Hayes) Ben Sokay – GW – 09:22		Second period	14:24 – Logan Gestro (Stief)
No scoring		Third period	No scoring
( 28 saves / 29 shots ) Brian Wilson		Goalie stats	Matt Ladd ( 20 saves / 22 shots )

Niagara won series 2–1

==== (7) Mercyhurst vs. (10) Army ====
March 8	Mercyhurst	2 – 3	OT	Army	Mercyhurst Ice Center	Recap
No scoring		First period		05:53 – Dalton MacAfee (Krueger, Fidler)
(Duszak, Barach) Matthew Whittaker – PP – 04:13		Second period		07:33 – PP – Dalton MacAfee (Wilkinson, Evancho)
(Duszak, Anderson) Derek Barach – 05:37		Third period		No scoring
No scoring		First overtime period		15:58 – GW – Dominic Franco (unassisted)
( 41 saves / 44 shots ) Stefano Cantali		Goalie stats		Matt Penta ( 33 saves / 35 shots )

March 9	Mercyhurst	1 – 5	Army	Mercyhurst Ice Center	Recap
(Best, Ipri) Josh McDougall – 11:43		First period	13:43 – Dominic Franco (MacAfee, Wilkinson)
No scoring		Second period	09:05 – Mason Krueger (Zimmerman, Soucie); 10:42 – Daniel Haider (Plunkett, Laurito); 11:41 – Mason Krueger (Soucie, Wilkinson)
No scoring		Third period	16:28 – Trevor Fidler (Krueger, Soucie)
( 46 saves / 51 shots ) Garrett Metcalf		Goalie stats	Matt Penta ( 26 saves / 27 shots )

Army won series 2–0

==== (8) Robert Morris vs. (9) Holy Cross ====
March 8	Robert Morris	1 – 0	Holy Cross	Colonials Arena	Recap
No scoring		First period	No scoring
(Mantenuto) Nick Prkusic – GW – 06:43		Second period	No scoring
No scoring		Third period	No scoring
( 30 saves / 30 shots ) Francis Marotte		Goalie stats	Tommy Nixon ( 29 saves / 30 shots )

March 9	Robert Morris	3 – 2	Holy Cross	Colonials Arena	Recap
No scoring		First period	05:07 – Ryan Leibold (Trapp, Collett)
(unassisted) Alex Tonge – PS – 04:11 (Prkusic) Daniel Mantenuto – 13:06		Second period	No scoring
(Lynch, Addamo) Nick Lalonde – 13:45		Third period	05:59 – Kevin Darrar (unassisted)
( 28 saves / 30 shots ) Francis Marotte		Goalie stats	Tommy Nixon ( 37 saves / 40 shots )

Robert Morris won series 2–0

=== Quarterfinals ===
==== (1) American International vs. (10) Army ====
March 15	American International	4 – 0	Army	MassMutual Center	Recap
(Reinhardt) Tobias Fladeby – GW – 06:13 (Luka, Dodero) Elijiah Barriga – 14:18		First period	No scoring
(McBride, Mellberg) Luka Maver – 02:15 (Cole) Joel Kocur – 03:23		Second period	No scoring
No scoring		Third period	No scoring
( 20 saves / 20 shots ) Zackarias Skog		Goalie stats	Matt Penta ( 10 saves / 13 shots ) / Jared Dempsey ( 12 saves / 13 shots )

March 16	American International	1 – 2	Army	MassMutual Center	Recap
No scoring		First period	No scoring
(Luka) Matus Spodniak – 08:17		Second period	17:37 – Trevor Fidler (Berkovitz, Soucie)
No scoring		Third period	06:50 – GW – Dalton MacAfee (Maruya, Higgins)
( 14 saves / 16 shots ) Zackarias Skog		Goalie stats	Matt Penta ( 21 saves / 22 shots )

March 17	American International	4 – 1	Army	MassMutual Center	Recap
(McBride, Demel) Hugo Reinhardt – 13:44		First period	No scoring
(Kapcheck, Luka) Kyle Stephan – GW – 15:47		Second period	No scoring
(unassisted) Blake Christensen – 05:05 (Reinhardt, Fladeby) Blake Christensen – 17:10		Third period	14:38 – Dalton MacAfee (Evancho, Butte)
( 33 saves / 34 shots ) Zackarias Skog		Goalie stats	Matt Penta ( 24 saves / 28 shots )

American International won series 2–1

==== (2) Bentley vs. (8) Robert Morris ====
March 15	Bentley	3 – 2	Robert Morris	Bentley Arena	Recap
(Orr, Lombardozzi) Jakov Novak – 12:55 (Callin, Desbiens) Brendan Hamblet – 19:38		First period	18:54 – Luke Lynch (Giles)
No scoring		Second period	11:19 – PP – Michael Louria (Tonge, Mantenuto)
(Santerno, Riggleman) Jakov Novak – GW – 18:23		Third period	No scoring
( 28 saves / 30 shots ) Aidan Pelino		Goalie stats	Francis Marotte ( 24 saves / 27 shots )

March 16	Bentley	1 – 2	Robert Morris	Bentley Arena	Recap
(Solovyev, Brassard) Jake Kauppila – PP – 01:33		First period	No scoring
No scoring		Second period	01:26 – PP – Eric Israel (Louria, Mantenuto)
No scoring		Third period	18:35 – GW – Michael Louria (Mantenuto)
( 29 saves / 31 shots ) Aidan Pelino		Goalie stats	Francis Marotte ( 28 saves / 29 shots )

March 17	Bentley	2 – 3	OT	Robert Morris	Bentley Arena	Recap
No scoring		First period		No scoring
(Zuffante, Brassard) Jakov Novak – 03:05		Second period		12:22 – Luke Lynch (Tonge, Prkusic)
(Callin, Desbiens) Brendan Hamblet – 01:39		Third period		02:10 – Aidan Spellacy (Coleman, Prkusic)
No scoring		First overtime period		16:04 – GW – Justin Addamo (Lynch)
( 24 saves / 27 shots ) Aidan Pelino		Goalie stats		Francis Marotte ( 32 saves / 34 shots )

Robert Morris won series 2–1

==== (3) Air Force vs. (6) Niagara ====
March 15	Air Force	2 – 3	OT	Niagara	Cadet Ice Arena	Recap
(Jaeger, Tyran) Pierce Pluemer – 01:58		First period		13:43 – Eric Cooley (Stenlund, Delmas)
(Tomlak, Harper) Dan Bailey – 01:48		Second period		00:58 – Ludwig Stenlund (Spriggs, Edgerton)
No scoring		Third period		No scoring
No scoring		First overtime period		07:38 – GW – Ludwig Stenlund (Curran, Kovachis)
( 20 saves / 23 shots ) Billy Christopoulos		Goalie stats		Brian Wilson ( 36 saves / 38 shots )

March 16	Air Force	4 – 5	Niagara	Cadet Ice Arena	Recap
(unassisted) Matt Pulver – 05:51 (Haak) Walker Sommer – 08:04		First period	04:42 – Tyler Hayes (Sokay); 16:26 – Chris Harpur (Edgerton, Farmer); 17:49 – PP – Noah Delmas (Stenlund, Kendall)
(Sommer, Mehnert) Kieran Durgan – PP – 08:53		Second period	16:47 – Kris Spriggs (Curran, Stenlund); 16:58 – GW – Nick Farmer (Edgerton)
(Mirageas) Erich Jaeger – 00:14		Third period	No scoring
( 19 saves / 24 shots ) Billy Christopoulos		Goalie stats	Brian Wilson ( 39 saves / 43 shots )

Niagara won series 2–0

==== (4) Sacred Heart vs. (5) RIT ====
March 13	Sacred Heart	9 – 4	RIT	Webster Bank Arena	Recap
(Rakhmatov, Crocock) Jordan Kaplan – 03:59 (Boyagian, Steele) Vito Bavaro – 05:06 (Cotton, Crocock) Alex Bates – 10:35		First period	10:35 – Alden Dupuis (Salloum, Hamacher); 18:58 – Abbott Girduckis (Brown, Brubacher)
(Magera, Bates) Jordan Kaplan – 09:01 (Rakhmatov, Johnstone) Austin Magera – GW – 11:48 (unassisted) Matt Tugnutt – 16:13 (Bavaro, Boyagian) Ryan Steele – 19:02		Second period	No scoring
(Kaplan, Rakhmatov) Marc Johnstone – 00:19 (unassisted) Matt Tugnutt – SH – 13:13		Third period	17:29 – Alden Dupuis (Willett); 19:03 – Nick Bruce (Walker, Valette)
( 23 saves / 27 shots ) Josh Benson		Goalie stats	Logan Drackett ( 13 saves / 18 shots ) / Ian Andriano ( 2 saves / 4 shots ) / Christian Short ( 7 saves / 9 shots )

March 14	Sacred Heart	3 – 7	RIT	Webster Bank Arena	Recap
No scoring		First period	08:03 – Shawn Cameron (Salloum, Dupuis); 10:52 – Ryan Kruper (Joffe); 16:06 – Chris McKay (Dupuis, Valette)
(Cotton, Bernard) Alex Bates – 18:50		Second period	13:03 – GW – Alden Dupuis (Cameron, Hamacher); 15:25 – Shawn Cameron (Hamacher, Dupuis)
(Bavaro, Lee) Ryan Steele – 02:39 (Cotton, Tugnutt) Todd Goehring – 12:14		Third period	16:45 – PP – Jake Hamacher (Brown, Girduckis); 19:02 – SH EN – Adam Brubacher (unassisted)
( 3 saves / 6 shots ) Josh Benson / ( 14 saves / 17 shots ) Brett Magnus		Goalie stats	Logan Drackett ( 36 saves / 39 shots )

March 15	Sacred Heart	1 – 3	RIT	Webster Bank Arena	Recap
(Goehring, Tugnutt) Jason Cotton – 02:14		First period	No scoring
No scoring		Second period	05:40 – PP – Erik Brown (Willett, Brubacher)
No scoring		Third period	17:39 – GW – Jake Hamacher (Dupuis); 19:40 – EN – Jake Hamacher (Cameron, Dupuis)
( 18 saves / 20 shots ) Brett Magnus		Goalie stats	Logan Drackett ( 31 saves / 32 shots )

RIT won series 2–1

=== Semifinals ===
==== (1) American International vs. (8) Robert Morris ====
March 22	American International	3 – 2	OT	Robert Morris	Harborcenter	Recap
(Polin) Jan Štefka – PP – 09:47		First period		18:02 – Alex Tonge (Louria, Mantenuto)
(Polin, Dodero) Joel Kocur – 02:56		Second period		No scoring
No scoring		Third period		14:31 – EN – Daniel Mantenuto (Prkusic, Tonge)
(McBride) Blake Christensen – GW – 01:44		First overtime period		No scoring
( 24 saves / 26 shots ) Zackarias Skog		Goalie stats		Francis Marotte ( 35 saves / 38 shots )

==== (5) RIT vs. (6) Niagara ====
March 22	RIT	0 – 1	OT	Niagara	Harborcenter	Recap
No scoring		First period		No scoring
No scoring		Second period		No scoring
No scoring		Third period		No scoring
No scoring		First overtime period		07:03 – GW – Ludwig Stenlund (Curran, Robinson)
( 26 saves / 27 shots ) Logan Drackett		Goalie stats		Brian Wilson ( 32 saves / 32 shots )

=== Championship ===
==== (1) American International vs. (6) Niagara ====
March 23	American International	3 – 2	OT	Niagara	Harborcenter	Recap
No scoring		First period		No scoring
(Reinhardt, McBride) Jānis Jaks – PP – 09:46 (Maver) Martin Mellberg – 19:59		Second period		06:21 – PP – Justin Kendall (Mills)
No scoring		Third period		06:16 – Kris Spriggs (Edgerton)
(Stephan, Christensen) Hugo Reinhardt – GW PP – 01:16		First overtime period		No scoring
( 22 saves / 24 shots ) Zackarias Skog		Goalie stats		Brian Wilson ( 31 saves / 34 shots )

== Tournament awards ==
=== All-Tournament Team ===
- G Zackarias Skog* (American International)
- D Jānis Jaks (American International)
- D Ryan Polin (American International)
- F Hugo Reinhardt (American International)
- F Blake Christensen (American International)
- F Ludwig Stenlund (Niagara)

* Most Valuable Player(s)
