= 2018–19 Air Force Falcons men's ice hockey season =

- Conference: 3rd Atlantic Hockey
- Home ice: Cadet Ice Arena

Rankings
- USCHO.com: NR
- USA Today: NR

Record
- Overall: 16–15–5
- Conference: 14–10–4
- Home: 9–7–3
- Road: 6–7–1
- Neutral: 1–1–1

Coaches and captains
- Head coach: Frank Serratore
- Assistant coaches: Andy Berg; Joe Doyle
- Captain(s): Matt Koch; Evan Giesler; Matt Serratore

The 2018–19 Air Force Falcons men's ice hockey season was the 51st season of play for the program and the 13th season in the Atlantic Hockey conference. The Falcons represented the United States Air Force Academy and were coached by Frank Serratore, in his 22nd season.

== Season ==
Coming off of two consecutive trips to the NCAA tournament, Air Force was attempting to live up to very lofty expectations, particularly for an Atlantic Hockey team. Unfortunately, the team got off to a poor start and began the season 1–4. The Falcons recovered afterwards and righted the ship with a five-game winning streak, placing them near the top of the conference standings. A sweep at the hands of American International in mid-November put them behind the 8-ball at least in terms of a league championship, but a good showing against Bemidji State and in the Ice Vegas Invitational gave the team hope for another NCAA appearance.

The second half of their season began similar to the first half and Air Force went through a stretch of five games without a win. They briefly bounced back against Robert Morris but then hovered around .500 for the remainder of the season. Entering the postseason, Air Force had no mathematic chance to make the 2019 NCAA tournament without winning their conference tournament. That glimmer of hope was quickly snuffed out when they were upset by Niagara in the quarterfinals.

After the season, Billy Christopoulos joined the select few graduates of the Air Force Academy to play professional hockey when he signed with the South Carolina Stingrays.

== Departures ==
Player	Position	Nationality	Cause
Dylan Abood	Defenseman	United States	Graduation (retired)
Erik Baskin	Forward	United States	Graduation (retired)
Phil Boje	Defenseman	United States	Graduation (retired)
Jordan Himley	Forward	United States	Graduation (retired)
Jonathan Kopacka	Defenseman	United States	Graduation (retired)
Ben Kucera	Forward	United States	Graduation (retired)
Tyler Ledford	Forward	United States	Graduation (retired)
Kyle Mackey	Defenseman	United States	Graduation (retired)
Isaac Theisen	Forward	United States	Left program
Will Ulrich	Goaltender	United States	Left program

== Recruiting ==
Player	Position	Nationality	Age	Notes
Kieran Durgan	Forward	United States	21	St. Johns, MI
Carter Ekberg	Defenseman	United States	21	McMurray, PA
Tyler Jutting	Defenseman	United States	21	Mankato, MN
Keegan Mantaro	Defenseman	United States	20	Monument, CO
Alex Schilling	Goaltender	United States	21	Medina, MN
Jensen Zerban	Forward	United States	20	Elk River, MN

== Roster ==
No.	Nat.	Player	Class	Pos	Height	Weight	DoB	Hometown	Previous team	NHL rights
2	(United States)	Tyler Jutting	Freshman	D	6' 4" (1.93 m)	203 lb (92 kg)	1997-07-27	Mankato, Minnesota	West Kelowna Warriors (BCHL)	—
3	(United States)	Jake Levin	Sophomore	D	6' 2" (1.88 m)	200 lb (91 kg)	1997-02-03	Mequon, Wisconsin	Odessa Jackalopes (NAHL)	—
6	(United States)	Alex Mehnert	Sophomore	D	5' 11" (1.8 m)	180 lb (82 kg)	1997-06-15	Moorhead, Minnesota	Omaha Lancers (USHL)	—
7	(United States)	Matt Koch (C)	Senior	D	6' 1" (1.85 m)	194 lb (88 kg)	1995-03-22	Hastings, Minnesota	Wichita Falls Wildcats (NAHL)	—
8	(United States)	Marshall Bowery	Sophomore	F	5' 10" (1.78 m)	170 lb (77 kg)	1996-11-17	Rochester Hills, Michigan	Topeka RoadRunners (NAHL)	—
9	(United States)	Trevor Stone	Junior	F	5' 9" (1.75 m)	185 lb (84 kg)	1996-06-03	Pleasant Plains, Illinois	Springfield Jr. Blues (NAHL)	—
10	(United States)	Keegan Mantaro	Freshman	D	5' 9" (1.75 m)	180 lb (82 kg)	1998-12-03	Monument, Colorado	Sioux City Musketeers (USHL)	—
11	(United States)	Max Harper	Sophomore	F	6' 3" (1.91 m)	195 lb (88 kg)	1996-09-29	Rochester Hills, Michigan	Topeka RoadRunners (NAHL)	—
12	(United States)	Matt Serratore (C)	Senior	F	5' 9" (1.75 m)	165 lb (75 kg)	1994-06-21	Bemidji, Minnesota	Penticton Vees (BCHL)	—
15	(United States)	Evan Giesler (C)	Senior	F	6' 0" (1.83 m)	185 lb (84 kg)	1994-02-19	Naperville, Illinois	Bismarck Bobcats (BCHL)	—
16	(United States)	Kyle Haak	Senior	F	6' 0" (1.83 m)	185 lb (84 kg)	1994-08-06	Okemos, Michigan	Aberdeen Wings (NAHL)	—
17	(United States)	Joe Tyran	Junior	D	6' 0" (1.83 m)	180 lb (82 kg)	1996-03-07	Chattaroy, Washington	Bismarck Bobcats (NAHL)	—
18	(United States)	Evan Feno	Senior	F	5' 9" (1.75 m)	170 lb (77 kg)	1995-02-14	Morrison, Colorado	Janesville Jets (NAHL)	—
20	(United States)	Dan Bailey	Senior	D	6' 1" (1.85 m)	174 lb (79 kg)	1996-03-21	St. Cloud, Minnesota	Wenatchee Wild (NAHL)	—
21	(United States)	Matt Pulver	Junior	F	5' 11" (1.8 m)	180 lb (82 kg)	1997-06-05	Chippewa Falls, Wisconsin	Aberdeen Wings (NAHL)	—
22	(United States)	Pierce Pluemer	Junior	F	6' 4" (1.93 m)	215 lb (98 kg)	1996-01-07	Phillips, Wisconsin	Odessa Jackalopes (NAHL)	—
25	(United States)	Carter Ekberg	Freshman	F	6' 2" (1.88 m)	190 lb (86 kg)	1997-05-14	Pittsburgh, Pennsylvania	Janesville Jets (NAHL)	—
26	(United States)	Erich Jaeger	Junior	F	6' 2" (1.88 m)	195 lb (88 kg)	1996-01-02	Coeur d'Alene, Idaho	Wichita Falls Wildcats (NAHL)	—
27	(United States)	Jensen Zerban	Freshman	F	5' 11" (1.8 m)	170 lb (77 kg)	1998-11-13	Elk River, Minnesota	Jamestown Rebels (NAHL)	—
28	(United States)	Brady Tomlak	Junior	F	6' 2" (1.88 m)	205 lb (93 kg)	1996-05-14	Oakland, Michigan	Springfield Jr. Blues (NAHL)	—
29	(United States)	Shawn Knowlton	Sophomore	F	5' 8" (1.73 m)	165 lb (75 kg)	1996-08-14	Slingerlands, New York	Aberdeen Wings (NAHL)	—
30	(United States)	Erik Anderson	Sophomore	G	5' 11" (1.8 m)	190 lb (86 kg)	1996-06-10	Chanhassen, Minnesota	Pikes Peak (RMJHL)	—
31	(United States)	Zach LaRocque	Sophomore	G	6' 2" (1.88 m)	205 lb (93 kg)	1997-01-26	Arvada, Colorado	Cedar Rapids RoughRiders (USHL)	—
33	(United States)	Alex Schilling	Freshman	G	6' 1" (1.85 m)	180 lb (82 kg)	1997-12-23	Medina, Minnesota	Austin Bruins (NAHL)	—
42	(United States)	Walker Sommer	Sophomore	F	5' 9" (1.75 m)	174 lb (79 kg)	1996-04-29	Avon, Ohio	New Jersey Hitmen (USPHL)	—
44	(United States)	Billy Christopoulos	Senior	G	6' 2" (1.88 m)	194 lb (88 kg)	1994-02-01	Raleigh, North Carolina	Alberni Valley Bulldogs (BCHL)	—
74	(United States)	Zack Mirageas	Sophomore	D	5' 9" (1.75 m)	180 lb (82 kg)	1997-07-15	Newburyport, Massachusetts	Bloomington Thunder (USHL)	—
88	(United States)	Kieran Durgan	Freshman	F	6' 1" (1.85 m)	185 lb (84 kg)	1997-08-20	St. Johns, Michigan	Shreveport Mudbugs (NAHL)	—

== Standings ==
2018–19 Atlantic Hockey Standings
	Conference record							Overall record					
	GP	W	L	T	PTS	GF	GA	GP	W	L	T	GF	GA
#16 American International †*	28	18	9	1	37	102	77	41	23	17	1	129	119
Bentley	28	15	9	4	34	94	75	37	17	15	5	113	98
Air Force	28	14	10	4	32	65	63	36	16	15	5	90	92
Sacred Heart	28	14	11	3	31	85	73	37	16	17	4	107	106
RIT	28	13	11	4	30	81	76	38	17	17	4	113	111
Niagara	28	11	12	5	27	94	96	41	17	19	5	127	140
Mercyhurst	28	11	13	4	26	88	94	38	13	20	5	113	134
Robert Morris	28	11	15	2	24	72	78	40	16	22	2	102	127
Holy Cross	28	10	14	4	24	81	89	36	10	21	5	91	112
Army	28	8	13	7	23	71	82	39	12	20	7	94	117
Canisius	28	8	16	4	20	77	107	37	12	20	5	103	133
Championship: March 23, 2019 † indicates conference regular season champion * indicates conference tournament champion (Riley Trophy); Rankings: USCHO.com Top 20 Poll

== Schedule and results ==
Date	Time	Opponent^{#}	Rank^{#}	Site	TV	Decision	Result	Attendance	Record
Exhibition
October 7	5:05 p.m.	vs. Alberta*		Cadet Ice Arena • Colorado Springs, Colorado		Christopoulos	T 2–2 ^{OT}	1,625	
Regular season
October 12	7:05 p.m.	vs. #10 Denver*		Cadet Ice Arena • Colorado Springs, Colorado		Christopoulos	L 1–4	2,386	0–1–0
October 13	7:07 p.m.	vs. Colorado College*		Broadmoor World Arena • Colorado Springs, Colorado (Battle for Pikes Peak)		Christopoulos	L 1–6	4,327	0–2–0
October 19	5:35 p.m.	at Canisius		LECOM Harborcenter • Buffalo, New York		Christopoulos	W 7–3	1,110	1–2–0 (1–0–0)
October 20	5:35 p.m.	at Canisius		LECOM Harborcenter • Buffalo, New York		Christopoulos	L 0–2	1,371	1–3–0 (1–1–0)
October 25	7:05 p.m.	vs. Niagara		Cadet Ice Arena • Colorado Springs, Colorado		Christopoulos	L 0–5	1,326	1–4–0 (1–2–0)
October 26	7:05 p.m.	vs. Niagara		Cadet Ice Arena • Colorado Springs, Colorado		Christopoulos	W 2–1	1,754	2–4–0 (2–2–0)
November 2	5:05 p.m.	at Army		Tate Rink • West Point, New York		Christopoulos	W 4–2	2,473	3–4–0 (3–2–0)
November 3	6:05 p.m.	at Army		Tate Rink • West Point, New York		Christopoulos	W 4–2	2,317	4–4–0 (4–2–0)
November 9	7:05 p.m.	vs. Bentley		Cadet Ice Arena • Colorado Springs, Colorado		LaRocque	W 4–2	1,833	5–4–0 (5–2–0)
November 10	7:35 p.m.	vs. Bentley		Cadet Ice Arena • Colorado Springs, Colorado		LaRocque	W 4–1	1,742	6–4–0 (6–2–0)
November 16	12:05 p.m.	vs. American International		MassMutual Center • Springfield, Massachusetts		LaRocque	L 0–5	117	6–5–0 (6–3–0)
November 17	11:05 a.m.	vs. American International		MassMutual Center • Springfield, Massachusetts		LaRocque	L 0–4	378	6–6–0 (6–4–0)
November 30	5:05 p.m.	at RIT		Gene Polisseni Center • Henrietta, New York		Christopoulos	W 3–1	2,851	7–6–0 (7–4–0)
December 1	5:05 p.m.	at RIT		Gene Polisseni Center • Henrietta, New York		Christopoulos	W 3–0	2,231	8–6–0 (8–4–0)
December 7	7:35 p.m.	vs. Mercyhurst		Cadet Ice Arena • Colorado Springs, Colorado		Christopoulos	W 2–0	1,607	9–6–0 (9–4–0)
December 8	5:05 p.m.	vs. Mercyhurst		Cadet Ice Arena • Colorado Springs, Colorado		Christopoulos	L 1–4	1,848	9–7–0 (9–5–0)
December 29	7:05 p.m.	vs. Bemidji State*		Cadet Ice Arena • Colorado Springs, Colorado		Christopoulos	T 3–3 ^{OT}	2,231	9–7–1
December 30	5:05 p.m.	vs. Bemidji State*		Cadet Ice Arena • Colorado Springs, Colorado		Christopoulos	W 6–3	2,261	10–7–1
Ice Vegas Invitational
January 4	9:35 p.m.	vs. St. Lawrence*		T-Mobile Arena • Paradise, Nevada (Ice Vegas semifinal)		Christopoulos	W 7–1	1,727	11–7–1
January 5	9:35 p.m.	vs. #17 Western Michigan*		T-Mobile Arena • Paradise, Nevada (Ice Vegas championship)		Christopoulos	L 1–4	1,807	11–8–1
January 11	7:05 p.m.	vs. Army		Cadet Ice Arena • Colorado Springs, Colorado		Christopoulos	T 2–2 ^{OT}	2,716	11–8–2 (9–5–1)
January 12	5:05 p.m.	vs. Army		Cadet Ice Arena • Colorado Springs, Colorado		Christopoulos	T 2–2 ^{OT}	2,528	11–8–3 (9–5–2)
January 19	12:05 p.m.	at Sacred Heart		Webster Bank Arena • Bridgeport, Connecticut		Christopoulos	L 1–3	356	11–9–3 (9–6–2)
January 20	2:05 p.m.	vs. Sacred Heart		Ingalls Rink • New Haven, Connecticut		Christopoulos	T 2–2 ^{OT}	203	11–9–4 (9–6–3)
January 25	7:05 p.m.	vs. Robert Morris		Cadet Ice Arena • Colorado Springs, Colorado		Christopoulos	W 3–1	1,902	12–9–4 (10–6–3)
January 26	5:05 p.m.	vs. Robert Morris		Cadet Ice Arena • Colorado Springs, Colorado		Christopoulos	W 3–1	1,942	13–9–4 (11–6–3)
February 1	5:05 p.m.	at Bentley		Bentley Arena • Waltham, Massachusetts		Christopoulos	L 3–4 ^{OT}	1,320	13–10–4 (11–7–3)
February 2	5:05 p.m.	at Bentley		Bentley Arena • Waltham, Massachusetts		Christopoulos	L 0–4	1,351	13–11–4 (11–8–3)
February 15	7:05 p.m.	vs. Canisius		Cadet Ice Arena • Colorado Springs, Colorado		Christopoulos	W 3–0	2,142	14–11–4 (12–8–3)
February 16	5:05 p.m.	vs. Canisius		Cadet Ice Arena • Colorado Springs, Colorado		Christopoulos	L 0–3	2,053	14–12–4 (12–9–3)
February 22	5:05 p.m.	at Mercyhurst		Mercyhurst Ice Center • Erie, Pennsylvania		Christopoulos	T 3–3 ^{OT}	1,338	14–12–5 (12–9–4)
February 23	5:05 p.m.	at Mercyhurst		Mercyhurst Ice Center • Erie, Pennsylvania		Christopoulos	W 4–2	1,222	15–12–5 (13–9–4)
March 1	7:05 p.m.	vs. Holy Cross		Cadet Ice Arena • Colorado Springs, Colorado		Christopoulos	L 1–2 ^{OT}	1,809	15–13–5 (13–10–4)
March 2	5:05 p.m.	vs. Holy Cross		Cadet Ice Arena • Colorado Springs, Colorado		Christopoulos	W 4–2	1,655	16–13–5 (14–10–4)
Atlantic Hockey tournament
March 15	7:05 p.m.	vs. Niagara*		Cadet Ice Arena • Colorado Springs, Colorado (Atlantic Hockey quarterfinals game 1)		Christopoulos	L 2–3 ^{OT}	1,474	16–14–5
March 7	7:05 p.m.	vs. Niagara*		Cadet Ice Arena • Colorado Springs, Colorado (Atlantic Hockey quarterfinals game 2)		Christopoulos	L 4–5	1,621	16–15–5
Air Force lost series 0–2
*Non-conference game. ^{#}Rankings from USCHO.com Poll. All times are in Mountain Time. Source:

== Scoring statistics ==
Name	Position	Games	Goals	Assists	Points	PIM
Matt Koch	D	35	4	21	27	20
Kyle Haak	F	35	12	11	23	20
Evan Fero	F	32	11	11	22	13
Evan Giesler	F	36	7	13	20	18
Kieran Durgan	F	36	12	6	18	8
Brady Tomlak	C	34	8	10	18	52
Zack Mirageas	D	35	1	16	17	51
Walker Sommer	C	35	9	5	14	12
Jake Levin	D	36	1	12	13	8
Alex Mehnert	D	36	1	11	12	24
Trevor Stone	C/LW	34	9	2	11	20
Matt Pulver	F	36	5	4	9	20
Joe Tyran	D	26	3	4	7	8
Erich Jaeger	F	26	1	5	6	24
Dan Bailey	D	36	2	3	5	28
Marshall Bowery	F	30	2	2	4	8
Pierce Pluemer	LW	23	1	2	3	10
Carter Ekberg	D	27	0	3	3	8
Matt Serratore	F	3	1	1	2	4
Max Harper	F	14	0	2	2	0
Shawn Knowlton	F	28	0	2	2	8
Keegan Mantaro	D	32	0	1	1	10
Zach LaRocque	G	5	0	0	0	0
Jensen Zerban	F	7	0	0	0	2
Tyler Jutting	D	10	0	0	0	0
Billy Christopoulos	G	32	0	0	0	0
Bench	-	-	-	-	-	12
Total			90	147	237	388

== Goaltending statistics ==
Name	Games	Minutes	Wins	Losses	Ties	Goals against	Saves	Shut-outs	SV %	GAA
Billy Christopoulos	32	1926	14	13	5	72	766	3	.914	2.24
Zach LaRocque	5	251	2	2	0	13	78	0	.857	3.10
Empty Net	-	19	-	-	-	7	-	-	-	-
Total	36	2197	16	15	5	92	844	3	.902	2.51

== Rankings ==
Poll	Week																										
Poll	Pre	1	2	3	4	5	6	7	8	9	10	11	12	13	14	15	16	17	18	19	20	21	22	23	24	25	26 (Final)
USCHO.com	NR	NR	NR	NR	NR	NR	NR	NR	NR	NR	NR	NR	NR	NR	NR	NR	NR	NR	NR	NR	NR	NR	NR	NR	NR	-	NR
USA Today	NR	NR	NR	NR	NR	NR	NR	NR	NR	NR	NR	NR	NR	NR	NR	NR	NR	NR	NR	NR	NR	NR	NR	NR	NR	NR	NR

USCHO did not release a poll in Week 25.

== Awards and honors ==
Player	Award	Ref
Kyle Haak	Senior CLASS Award	
Billy Christopoulos	Atlantic Hockey Regular Season Goaltending Award	
Billy Christopoulos	Atlantic Hockey First Team	
