= 2017–18 Air Force Falcons men's ice hockey season =

Atlantic Hockey Tournament, champion NCAA Tournament, West Regional final
- Conference: T–3rd Atlantic Hockey
- Home ice: Cadet Ice Arena

Rankings
- USCHO.com: 14
- USA Today: 14

Record
- Overall: 23–15–5
- Conference: 13–11–4
- Home: 7–8–1
- Road: 11–6–4
- Neutral: 3–2–0

Coaches and captains
- Head coach: Frank Serratore
- Assistant coaches: Andy Berg; Joe Doyle
- Captain: Dylan Abood
- Alternate captain(s): Erik Baskin; Phil Boje; Tyler Ledford

The 2017–18 Air Force Falcons men's ice hockey season was the 50th season of play for the program and the 12th season in the Atlantic Hockey conference. The Falcons represented the United States Air Force Academy and were coached by Frank Serratore, in his 21st season.

== Season ==
After a program-best season, Air Force entered the season with a preseason ranking, a rarity for an Atlantic Hockey school. Early on it appeared that the Falcons were going to live up to the expectations when new starting goaltender, Billy Christopoulos, filled in ably for the departed Shane Starett. However, after beginning 5–1–1, the team's offense faltered and the Falcons went through a rough patch in November and December. The defense kept Air Force in most of their games, but the Falcons were finding it difficult to score. By the end of the year, the team found itself under .500 and wallowing near the bottom of the conference standings.

Christopoulos raised his game in the second half of the season, keeping the opposition to 2 goals or fewer on most nights. The offense, too, redoubled its efforts and the Falcons began to score once more. Slowly, the team climbed out of the cellar and moved up the standings. By the end of February, Air Force had miraculously pulled into a 3-way tie for 3rd place in the conference and entered the Atlantic Hockey Tournament with a bye into the quarterfinal round.

=== Conference tournament ===
As their postseason began, Air Force's only chance at making the NCAA Tournament was to win their conference. To do that, they would first have to overcome Army on the road. After winning the first game 5–3, the Falcons got into a defensive struggle with the Black Knights. Despite firing 33 shots on goal, Army netminder Cole Bruns turned everything aside and tied the series with a 1–0 victory. The Falcons increased the pressure in the deciding 3rd game, but again Bruns wouldn't let anything get past him. Fortunately, Christopoulos was equal to the task and the teams entered overtime with a clean scoresheet. Air Force continued the barrage, firing five shots on goal in less than 7 minutes with the last finally registering. Senior alternate captain Tyler Ledford won the game and sent the Falcons to the semifinals.

After arriving in Rochester, the Air Force offense kept up its shot total while Christopoulos remained stout in goal. The Falcons dispatched Canisius to reach their second consecutive title game and found a surprise waiting for them; the 7th-seed, Robert Morris had overcome long odds to reach the final and were riding high after taking down top-seeded Mercyhurst. Air Force put the Colonials in their place at the start, scoring twice in the first three minutes and ending the first period up 3–0. Robert Morris made a valiant effort to try and come back in the final 40 minutes, but Christopoulos was far too strong in net and the Falcons won the match by a comfortable 5–1 margin, earning the program's 7th Atlantic Hockey championship and a trip back to the NCAA tournament.

=== NCAA tournament ===
Though the team had been good over the preceding two and a half months, it was no surprise when Air Force was given the lowest seed for the tournament. That entitled the Falcons to a date with #1 St. Cloud State. The game started slowly but the Air Force needed to kill of two penalties in the later half of the first period to keep the Huskies from getting a lead. Early in the second, Ledford scored twice in the span of just over 3:30 to give the Falcons a surprising 2–0 lead. Afterwards, St. Cloud woke up and began attacking the Air Force goal. Christopoulos turned aside 18 shots in the middle frame to keep the Huskies from scoring. The upperclassmen continued to stymie St. Cloud State in the third but finally allowed the puck to get past him with just under 3 minutes left in regulation. The Huskies pulled their goalie in a desperate attempt to tie the game, but Air Force managed to collect two empty-net goals to win the match 4–1.

One win away from its first Frozen Four, the team was completely outplayed in the first period against Minnesota–Duluth. Air Force was outshot 0–14 and allowed two goals. The Bulldogs pulled back and played a defensive game in the final 40 minutes but that gave the Falcons a chance to tie the match. Though they only managed 12 shots in that time, Evan Giesler scored a power play goal in the middle part of the third period to cut the lead in half and the Falcons desperately tried to score the tying goal. Unfortunately, it wasn't to be and the Falcons were knocked out in the quarterfinal round.

== Departures ==
Player	Position	Nationality	Cause
Matthew Burchill	Defenseman	United States	Transferred to Norwich
Johnny Hrabovsky	Defenseman	United States	Graduation (retired)
A. J. Reid	Forward	United States	Graduation (retired)
Tyler Rostenkowski	Defenseman	United States	Left program
Shane Starrett	Goaltender	United States	Signed professional contract (Bakersfield Condors)

== Recruiting ==
Player	Position	Nationality	Age	Notes
Erik Anderson	Goaltender	United States	21	Chanhassen, MN
Marshall Bowery	Forward	United States	20	Rochester Hills, MI
Max Harper	Forward	United States	21	Rochester Hills, MI
Shawn Knowlton	Forward	United States	21	Slingerlands, NY
Zach LaRocque	Goaltender	United States	20	Arvada, CO
Jacob Levin	Defenseman	United States	20	Mequon, WI
Alex Mehnert	Defenseman	United States	20	Moorhead, MN
Zachary Mirageas	Defenseman	United States	20	Avon, OH
Walker Sommer	Forward	United States	21	Arvada, CO
Isaac Theisen	Forward	United States	21	Monroe, MI
Will Ulrich	Goaltender	United States	21	Bloomfield Hills, MI

== Roster ==
No.	Nat.	Player	Class	Pos	Height	Weight	DoB	Hometown	Previous team	NHL rights
2	(United States)	Kyle Mackey	Senior	D	6' 1" (1.85 m)	174 lb (79 kg)	1994-10-07	Derby, New York	Youngstown Phantoms (USHL)	—
3	(United States)	Jake Levin	Freshman	D	6' 2" (1.88 m)	200 lb (91 kg)	1997-02-03	Mequon, Wisconsin	Odessa Jackalopes (NAHL)	—
4	(United States)	Phil Boje (A)	Senior	D	5' 11" (1.8 m)	192 lb (87 kg)	1994-04-13	Shoreview, Minnesota	Dubuque Fighting Saints (USHL)	—
6	(United States)	Alex Mehnert	Freshman	D	5' 11" (1.8 m)	180 lb (82 kg)	1997-06-15	Moorhead, Minnesota	Omaha Lancers (USHL)	—
7	(United States)	Matt Koch	Junior	D	6' 1" (1.85 m)	194 lb (88 kg)	1995-03-22	Hastings, Minnesota	Wichita Falls Wildcats (NAHL)	—
8	(United States)	Marshall Bowery	Freshman	F	5' 10" (1.78 m)	170 lb (77 kg)	1996-11-17	Rochester Hills, Michigan	Topeka RoadRunners (NAHL)	—
9	(United States)	Trevor Stone	Sophomore	F	5' 9" (1.75 m)	185 lb (84 kg)	1996-06-03	Pleasant Plains, Illinois	Springfield Jr. Blues (NAHL)	—
10	(United States)	Jordan Himley	Senior	F	5' 8" (1.73 m)	161 lb (73 kg)	1993-12-26	Mundelein, Illinois	Janesville Jets (NAHL)	—
11	(United States)	Max Harper	Freshman	F	6' 3" (1.91 m)	195 lb (88 kg)	1996-09-29	Rochester Hills, Michigan	Topeka RoadRunners (NAHL)	—
12	(United States)	Matt Serratore	Junior	F	5' 9" (1.75 m)	165 lb (75 kg)	1994-06-21	Bemidji, Minnesota	Penticton Vees (BCHL)	—
13	(United States)	Tyler Ledford (A)	Senior	F	5' 9" (1.75 m)	161 lb (73 kg)	1994-04-29	Folsom, California	Wichita Falls Wildcats (NAHL)	—
14	(United States)	Ben Kucera	Senior	F	5' 7" (1.7 m)	185 lb (84 kg)	1995-04-23	Overland Park, Kansas	Wichita Falls Wildcats (NAHL)	—
15	(United States)	Evan Giesler	Junior	F	6' 0" (1.83 m)	185 lb (84 kg)	1994-02-19	Naperville, Illinois	Bismarck Bobcats (BCHL)	—
16	(United States)	Kyle Haak	Junior	F	6' 0" (1.83 m)	185 lb (84 kg)	1994-08-06	Okemos, Michigan	Aberdeen Wings (NAHL)	—
17	(United States)	Joe Tyran	Sophomore	D	6' 0" (1.83 m)	180 lb (82 kg)	1996-03-07	Chattaroy, Washington	Bismarck Bobcats (NAHL)	—
18	(United States)	Evan Feno	Junior	F	5' 9" (1.75 m)	170 lb (77 kg)	1995-02-14	Morrison, Colorado	Janesville Jets (NAHL)	—
19	(United States)	Isaac Theisen	Freshman	F	6' 0" (1.83 m)	174 lb (79 kg)	1996-04-13	Monroe, Michigan	Coulee Region Chill (NAHL)	—
20	(United States)	Dan Bailey	Junior	D	6' 1" (1.85 m)	174 lb (79 kg)	1996-03-21	St. Cloud, Minnesota	Wenatchee Wild (NAHL)	—
21	(United States)	Matt Pulver	Sophomore	F	5' 11" (1.8 m)	180 lb (82 kg)	1997-06-05	Chippewa Falls, Wisconsin	Aberdeen Wings (NAHL)	—
22	(United States)	Pierce Pluemer	Sophomore	F	6' 4" (1.93 m)	215 lb (98 kg)	1996-01-07	Phillips, Wisconsin	Odessa Jackalopes (NAHL)	—
23	(United States)	Dylan Abood (C)	Senior	D	5' 8" (1.73 m)	165 lb (75 kg)	1993-05-31	Centennial, Colorado	Rio Grande Valley Killer Bees (NAHL)	—
26	(United States)	Erich Jaeger	Sophomore	F	6' 2" (1.88 m)	195 lb (88 kg)	1996-01-02	Coeur d'Alene, Idaho	Wichita Falls Wildcats (NAHL)	—
27	(United States)	Erik Baskin (A)	Senior	F	6' 3" (1.91 m)	201 lb (91 kg)	1993-10-11	Minnetonka, Minnesota	Aberdeen Wings (NAHL)	—
28	(United States)	Brady Tomlak	Sophomore	F	6' 2" (1.88 m)	205 lb (93 kg)	1996-05-14	Oakland, Michigan	Springfield Jr. Blues (NAHL)	—
29	(United States)	Shawn Knowlton	Freshman	F	5' 8" (1.73 m)	165 lb (75 kg)	1996-08-14	Slingerlands, New York	Aberdeen Wings (NAHL)	—
30	(United States)	Erik Anderson	Freshman	G	5' 11" (1.8 m)	190 lb (86 kg)	1996-06-10	Chanhassen, Minnesota	Pikes Peak (RMJHL)	—
31	(United States)	Zach LaRocque	Freshman	G	6' 2" (1.88 m)	205 lb (93 kg)	1997-01-26	Arvada, Colorado	Cedar Rapids RoughRiders (USHL)	—
38	(United States)	Will Ulrich	Freshman	G	6' 1" (1.85 m)	185 lb (84 kg)	1996-09-18	Bloomfield Hills, Michigan	Bismarck Bobcats (NAHL)	—
42	(United States)	Walker Sommer	Freshman	F	5' 9" (1.75 m)	174 lb (79 kg)	1996-04-29	Avon, Ohio	New Jersey Hitmen (USPHL)	—
44	(United States)	Billy Christopoulos	Junior	G	6' 2" (1.88 m)	194 lb (88 kg)	1994-02-01	Raleigh, North Carolina	Alberni Valley Bulldogs (BCHL)	—
52	(United States)	Jonathan Kopacka	Senior	D	6' 1" (1.85 m)	185 lb (84 kg)	1993-05-28	Macomb, Michigan	Port Huron Fighting Falcons (NAHL)	—
74	(United States)	Zack Mirageas	Freshman	D	5' 9" (1.75 m)	180 lb (82 kg)	1997-07-15	Newburyport, Massachusetts	Bloomington Thunder (USHL)	—

== Standings ==
2017–18 Atlantic Hockey men's standings
	Conference record							Overall record					
	GP	W	L	T	PTS	GF	GA	GP	W	L	T	GF	GA
Mercyhurst†	28	16	8	4	36	90	81	37	21	12	4	124	111
Canisius	28	17	11	0	34	94	76	38	19	17	2	117	108
Holy Cross	28	12	10	6	30	80	70	36	13	16	7	97	100
Army	28	12	10	6	30	80	70	36	15	15	6	93	91
#14 Air Force *	28	13	11	4	30	73	64	43	23	15	5	115	94
RIT	28	13	14	1	27	91	90	37	15	20	2	114	127
Robert Morris	28	12	13	3	27	79	78	41	18	20	3	119	118
American International	28	11	13	4	26	63	75	39	15	20	4	88	116
Niagara	28	10	15	3	23	76	90	36	11	22	3	93	123
Bentley	28	9	14	5	23	72	87	37	13	18	6	96	114
Sacred Heart	28	9	15	4	22	79	96	39	13	22	4	107	135
Championship: March 17, 2018 † indicates conference regular season champion * indicates conference tournament champion (Riley Trophy); Rankings: USCHO.com Top 20 Poll; updated March 5, 2018

== Schedule and results ==
Date	Time	Opponent^{#}	Rank^{#}	Site	TV	Decision	Result	Attendance	Record
Exhibition
October 2	6:05 PM	vs. Lethbridge*	#17	Cadet Ice Arena • Colorado Springs, Colorado		Christopoulos	W 3–0	1,202	
Regular season
October 6	9:07 PM	at Alaska*	#17	Carlson Center • Fairbanks, Alaska		Christopoulos	W 3–2	2,195	1–0–0
October 7	9:07 PM	at Alaska*	#17	Carlson Center • Fairbanks, Alaska		Christopoulos	T 1–1 ^{3x3 OTL}	2,649	1–0–1
October 13	7:05 PM	vs. Arizona State*	#19	Cadet Ice Arena • Colorado Springs, Colorado		Christopoulos	W 4–3	2,494	2–0–1
October 14	7:05 PM	vs. Arizona State*	#19	Cadet Ice Arena • Colorado Springs, Colorado		Christopoulos	L 3–2	2,437	3–0–1
October 20	6:07 PM	at Bemidji State*	#20	Sanford Center • Bemidji, Minnesota		Christopoulos	L 1–4	2,822	3–1–1
October 21	6:07 PM	at Bemidji State*	#20	Sanford Center • Bemidji, Minnesota		Christopoulos	W 5–1	2,902	4–1–1
October 27	5:35 PM	at Canisius	#18	LECOM Harborcenter • Buffalo, New York		Christopoulos	L 3–1	846	5–1–1 (1–0–0)
October 28	5:35 PM	at Canisius	#18	LECOM Harborcenter • Buffalo, New York		Christopoulos	L 2–3	580	5–2–1 (1–1–0)
November 3	7:05 PM	vs. Army	#19	Cadet Ice Arena • Colorado Springs, Colorado		Christopoulos	L 2–3	3,326	5–3–1 (1–2–0)
November 4	7:35 PM	vs. Army	#19	Cadet Ice Arena • Colorado Springs, Colorado		Christopoulos	L 0–2	2,477	5–4–1 (1–3–0)
November 10	5:05 PM	at Holy Cross		Hart Center • Worcester, Massachusetts		Christopoulos	L 0–3	1,164	5–5–1 (1–4–0)
November 11	5:05 PM	at Holy Cross		Hart Center • Worcester, Massachusetts		Christopoulos	T 3–3 ^{OT}	1,383	5–5–2 (1–4–1)
November 17	7:05 PM	vs. RIT		Cadet Ice Arena • Colorado Springs, Colorado		Christopoulos	W 4–3	1,875	6–5–2 (2–4–1)
November 18	7:05 PM	vs. RIT		Cadet Ice Arena • Colorado Springs, Colorado		Christopoulos	L 2–3	2,013	6–6–2 (2–5–1)
November 25	5:05 PM	at Sacred Heart		Webster Bank Arena • Bridgeport, Connecticut		Christopoulos	T 3–3 ^{OT}	201	6–6–3 (2–5–2)
November 26	10:30 AM	at Sacred Heart		Webster Bank Arena • Bridgeport, Connecticut		Christopoulos	W 5–3	161	7–6–3 (3–5–2)
December 1	7:05 PM	vs. Niagara		Cadet Ice Arena • Colorado Springs, Colorado		Christopoulos	L 3–6	1,974	7–7–3 (3–6–2)
December 2	5:05 PM	vs. Niagara		Cadet Ice Arena • Colorado Springs, Colorado		Christopoulos	L 2–5	1,687	7–8–3 (3–7–2)
December 29	7:05 PM	vs. Colorado College*		Cadet Ice Arena • Colorado Springs, Colorado (Battle for Pikes Peak)		Christopoulos	W 6–3	2,921	8–8–3
December 30	7:05 PM	at #2 Denver*		Magness Arena • Denver, Colorado	Altitude2	Christopoulos	L 0–6	6,281	8–9–3
January 5	7:05 PM	vs. Mercyhurst		Cadet Ice Arena • Colorado Springs, Colorado		Christopoulos	L 0–1	2,148	8–10–3 (3–8–2)
January 6	5:05 PM	vs. Mercyhurst		Cadet Ice Arena • Colorado Springs, Colorado		Christopoulos	W 5–1	1,909	9–10–3 (4–8–2)
January 12	5:05 PM	at RIT		Gene Polisseni Center • Henrietta, New York		Christopoulos	W 2–1	1,581	10–10–3 (5–8–2)
January 13	5:05 PM	at RIT		Gene Polisseni Center • Henrietta, New York		Christopoulos	W 4–0	2,543	11–10–3 (6–8–2)
January 19	7:05 PM	vs. Sacred Heart		Cadet Ice Arena • Colorado Springs, Colorado		Christopoulos	L 1–2	2,277	11–11–3 (6–9–2)
January 26	5:05 PM	at Niagara		Dwyer Arena • Lewiston, New York		Christopoulos	W 4–2	708	12–11–3 (7–9–2)
January 27	7:05 PM	at Niagara		Dwyer Arena • Lewiston, New York		Christopoulos	W 5–3	736	13–11–3 (8–9–2)
February 2	7:05 PM	vs. American International		Cadet Ice Arena • Colorado Springs, Colorado		Christopoulos	W 3–0	2,236	14–11–3 (9–9–2)
February 3	5:05 PM	vs. American International		Cadet Ice Arena • Colorado Springs, Colorado		Christopoulos	T 2–2 ^{OT}	2,153	14–11–4 (9–9–3)
February 9	5:05 PM	at Bentley		Bentley Arena • Waltham, Massachusetts		Christopoulos	L 0–2	578	14–12–4 (9–10–3)
February 10	5:05 PM	at Bentley		Bentley Arena • Waltham, Massachusetts		Christopoulos	W 4–2	480	15–12–4 (10–10–3)
February 13	10:00 AM	vs. Sacred Heart		People's United Center • Hamden, Connecticut		Christopoulos	L 1–2 ^{OT}	116	15–13–4 (10–11–3)
February 16	7:05 PM	vs. Canisius		Cadet Ice Arena • Colorado Springs, Colorado		Christopoulos	W 7–4	2,217	16–13–4 (11–11–3)
February 16	5:05 PM	vs. Canisius		Cadet Ice Arena • Colorado Springs, Colorado		Christopoulos	W 3–2	2,377	17–13–4 (12–11–3)
February 23	5:05 PM	at Robert Morris		Colonials Arena • Neville Township, Pennsylvania		Christopoulos	W 1–0	892	18–13–4 (13–11–3)
February 24	5:15 PM	at Robert Morris		Colonials Arena • Neville Township, Pennsylvania		Christopoulos	T 2–2 ^{OT}	1,317	18–13–5 (13–11–4)
Atlantic Hockey Tournament
March 9	5:05 PM	at Army*		Tate Rink • West Point, New York (Atlantic Hockey quarterfinals game 1)		Christopoulos	W 5–3	1,544	19–13–5
March 10	5:05 PM	at Army*		Tate Rink • West Point, New York (Atlantic Hockey quarterfinals game 2)		Christopoulos	L 0–1	2,009	19–14–5
March 11	5:05 PM	at Army*		Tate Rink • West Point, New York (Atlantic Hockey quarterfinals game 3)		Christopoulos	W 1–0 ^{OT}	1,082	20–14–5
Air Force Won Series 2–1
March 16	6:30 PM	vs. Canisius*		Blue Cross Arena • Rochester, New York (Atlantic Hockey semifinal)		Christopoulos	W 3–0	587	21–14–5
March 17	5:35 PM	vs. Robert Morris*		Blue Cross Arena • Rochester, New York (Atlantic Hockey championship)		Christopoulos	W 5–1	626	22–14–5
NCAA Tournament
March 23	2:02 PM	vs. #1 St. Cloud State*		Premier Center • Sioux Falls, South Dakota (West Regional semifinal)	ESPNU	Christopoulos	W 4–1	7,992	23–14–5
March 24	7:02 PM	vs. #11 Minnesota–Duluth*		Premier Center • Sioux Falls, South Dakota (West Regional final)	ESPN2	Christopoulos	L 1–2	8,015	23–15–5
*Non-conference game. ^{#}Rankings from USCHO.com Poll. All times are in Mountain Time. Source:

== Scoring statistics ==
Name	Position	Games	Goals	Assists	Points	PIM
Erik Baskin	F	43	16	12	28	12
Tyler Ledford	F	30	6	18	24	10
Evan Giesler	F	42	12	11	23	31
Jordan Himley	F	37	11	12	23	16
Matt Serratore	F	38	14	8	22	33
Matt Koch	D	37	3	15	18	14
Brady Tomlak	C	37	5	12	17	22
Phil Boje	D	39	2	15	17	18
Zack Mirageas	D	41	2	15	17	57
Ben Kucera	C	38	4	9	13	14
Trevor Stone	C/LW	39	4	9	13	14
Kyle Haak	F	29	7	5	12	22
Marshall Bowery	F	30	8	1	9	2
Erich Jaeger	F	34	2	7	9	23
Pierce Pluemer	LW	34	3	5	8	8
Jonathan Kopacka	D	31	3	4	7	10
Dan Bailey	D	38	1	6	7	14
Alex Mehnert	D	15	2	4	6	6
Jake Levin	D	21	2	4	6	14
Dylan Abood	D	35	1	5	6	16
Walker Sommer	C	18	1	4	5	4
Kyle Mackey	D	19	2	2	4	20
Matt Pulver	F	20	2	1	3	4
Joe Tyran	D	23	2	1	3	9
Max Harper	F	5	0	1	1	2
Billy Christopoulos	G	43	0	1	1	2
Evan Feno	F	1	0	0	0	0
Zack LaRocque	G	2	0	0	0	0
Bench	-	-	-	-	-	20
Total			115	187	302	417

== Goaltending statistics ==
Name	Games	Minutes	Wins	Losses	Ties	Goals against	Saves	Shut outs	SV %	GAA
Billy Christopoulos	43	2534	23	15	5	87	1026	5	.922	2.06
Zach LaRocque	2	53	0	0	0	3	21	0	.875	3.36
Empty Net	-	26	-	-	-	4	-	-	-	-
Total	43	2614	23	15	5	94	1047	5	.918	2.16

== Rankings ==
Poll	Week																									
Poll	Pre	1	2	3	4	5	6	7	8	9	10	11	12	13	14	15	16	17	18	19	20	21	22	23	24	25 (Final)
USCHO.com	17	19	20	18	19	NR	NR	NR	NR	NR	NR	NR	NR	NR	NR	NR	NR	NR	NR	NR	NR	NR	NR	NR	-	14
USA Today	NR	NR	NR	NR	NR	NR	NR	NR	NR	NR	NR	NR	NR	NR	NR	NR	NR	NR	NR	NR	NR	NR	NR	NR	14	14

USCHO did not release a poll in Week 24.

== Awards and honors ==
Player	Award	Ref
Dylan Abood	Derek Hines Unsung Hero Award	
Billy Christopoulos	Atlantic Hockey Regular Season Goaltending Award	
Billy Christopoulos	Atlantic Hockey Tournament MVP	
Billy Christopoulos	All-Atlantic Hockey Third Team	
Billy Christopoulos	Atlantic Hockey All-Tournament Team	
Zack Mirageas	Atlantic Hockey All-Tournament Team	
Jonathan Kopacka	Atlantic Hockey All-Tournament Team	
Kyle Haak	Atlantic Hockey All-Tournament Team	
Jordan Himley	Atlantic Hockey All-Tournament Team	
