= Blake Christensen =

American ice hockey player

- Born: September 15, 1995 (age 31) Coral Springs, Florida, USA
- Height: 5 ft 10 in (178 cm)
- Weight: 180 lb (82 kg; 12 st 12 lb)
- Position: Left wing
- Shoots: Left
- ECHL team Former teams: Kalamazoo Wings; Manglerud Star Ishockey; Bakersfield Condors; Springfield Thunderbirds; HC Thurgau
- Playing career: 2020–present

Blake Christensen (born September 15, 1995) is an American professional ice hockey left wing for the Kalamazoo Wings of the ECHL. He was an All-American for American International. He also broke the league’s record for most points. Christensen played for the USA 18 team. Christensen owns his own hockey business, Christo Hockey.

== Playing career ==
Christensen bounced around between several junior hockey teams, playing for four different clubs over a two-year span. The constant changes did little to help his growth as a player and in 2015, Christensen left the USHL and headed north to Canada. In his final season of junior eligibility, he spent the entire year with the Wenatchee Wild and posted solid offensive numbers. He was able earn a scholarship to American International though, at the time, there wasn't much to celebrate about the situation. Since it had joined Division I in 1998, AIC had traditionally been the worst performing team in the nation. While the program had graduated all of its players over the years, very few would go on to professional playing careers after their time in Springfield. Christensen arrived just in time to meet a new head coach, Eric Lang, while Christensen's leading the team in scoring that year could have been a sign of things to come, the record wasn't much different that it had been for decades.

In his sophomore season, Christensen increased his goal output but his point production remained about the same. The team, however, showed a different level of play under their new bench boss and won 15 games during the season, the most the Yellow Jackets had recorded in 25 years. The upward ascent of the program continued in Christensen's junior campaign and the entire team worked together to produce the best season in program history. Christensen more than doubled his point production and set program records for both assists and points in a season. He finished just 3 points behind the national scoring leader and was named an All-American, the first for AIC at the Division I level. His offensive explosion helped the Yellow Jackets post their first 20-win season in 30 years and win their first ever regular season conference championship. In AIC's run through the Atlantic Hockey Tournament, Christensen was instrumental in helping the team win the title, scoring the overtime winner in the semifinal while assisting on the OT marker in the title game. The conference championship earned American International its first ever NCAA Tournament appearance, through the team was given the lowest seed in the bracket. However, despite being badly outshot in the game, Christensen assisted on Brennan Kapcheck's game-winner, giving AIC an astounding upset over top-seeded St. Cloud State.

Christensen returned for his senior season and was named as an alternate captain. While his scoring declined slightly, the Yellow Jackets were on pace to make a second bid for the NCAA Tournament. Unfortunately, after AIC won its second consecutive regular season title, the remainder of the season was cancelled due to the COVID-19 pandemic. The pandemic also delayed the start of Christensen's professional career and he began the following season playing with Manglerud Star Ishockey. When the AHL season eventually got under way he debuted for the Bakersfield Condors but he couldn't find his form. Christensen ended up playing just 10 games and was not retained after the year.

Despite a lackluster first season, Christensen signed a second professional contract, this time with the Springfield Thunderbirds.

== Personal life ==
Blake's father Terry is a long-time ice hockey coach. He was an assistant at Michigan State when the Spartans won the national title in 1986.

== Career statistics ==
			Regular season					Playoffs
Season	Team	League	GP	G	A	Pts	PIM	GP	G	A	Pts	PIM
2012–13	U.S. National Development Team	USHL	29	3	2	5	57	—	—	—	—	—
2013–14	Youngstown Phantoms	USHL	12	2	0	2	20	—	—	—	—	—
2013–14	Muskegon Lumberjacks	USHL	10	1	0	1	19	—	—	—	—	—
2013–14	Lincoln Stars	USHL	23	3	8	11	50	—	—	—	—	—
2014–15	Lincoln Stars	USHL	27	5	8	13	82	—	—	—	—	—
2014–15	Sioux City Musketeers	USHL	28	3	7	10	49	—	—	—	—	—
2015–16	Wenatchee Wild	BCHL	52	16	20	36	32	10	5	3	8	10
2016–17	American International	AHA	33	8	13	21	37	—	—	—	—	—
2017–18	American International	AHA	34	13	10	23	50	—	—	—	—	—
2018–19	American International	AHA	41	16	31	47	22	—	—	—	—	—
2019–20	American International	AHA	34	11	17	28	12	—	—	—	—	—
2020–21	Manglerud Star Ishockey	Norway	10	4	5	9	14	—	—	—	—	—
2020–21	Milwaukee Admirals	AHL	10	2	0	2	12	—	—	—	—	—
2021–22	Worcester Railers	ECHL	36	18	10	28	31	—	—	—	—	—
2021–22	Springfield Thunderbirds	AHL	11	0	0	0	9	—	—	—	—	—
2022–23	Worcester Railers	ECHL	35	8	15	23	13	—	—	—	—	—
2022–23	HC Thurgau	SL	—	—	—	—	—	4	1	2	3	4
AHL totals			21	2	0	2	21	—	—	—	—	—

== Awards and honors ==
Award	Year
College
All-Atlantic Hockey First Team	2018–19
AHCA East Second Team All-American	2018–19
Atlantic Hockey All-Tournament Team	2019
All-Atlantic Hockey First Team	2019–20

Awards and achievements
Preceded by Dylan McLaughlin	Atlantic Hockey Scoring Trophy; 2018–19	Succeeded by Austin McIlmurray
