= Jānis Jaks =

Latvian ice hockey player (born 1995)

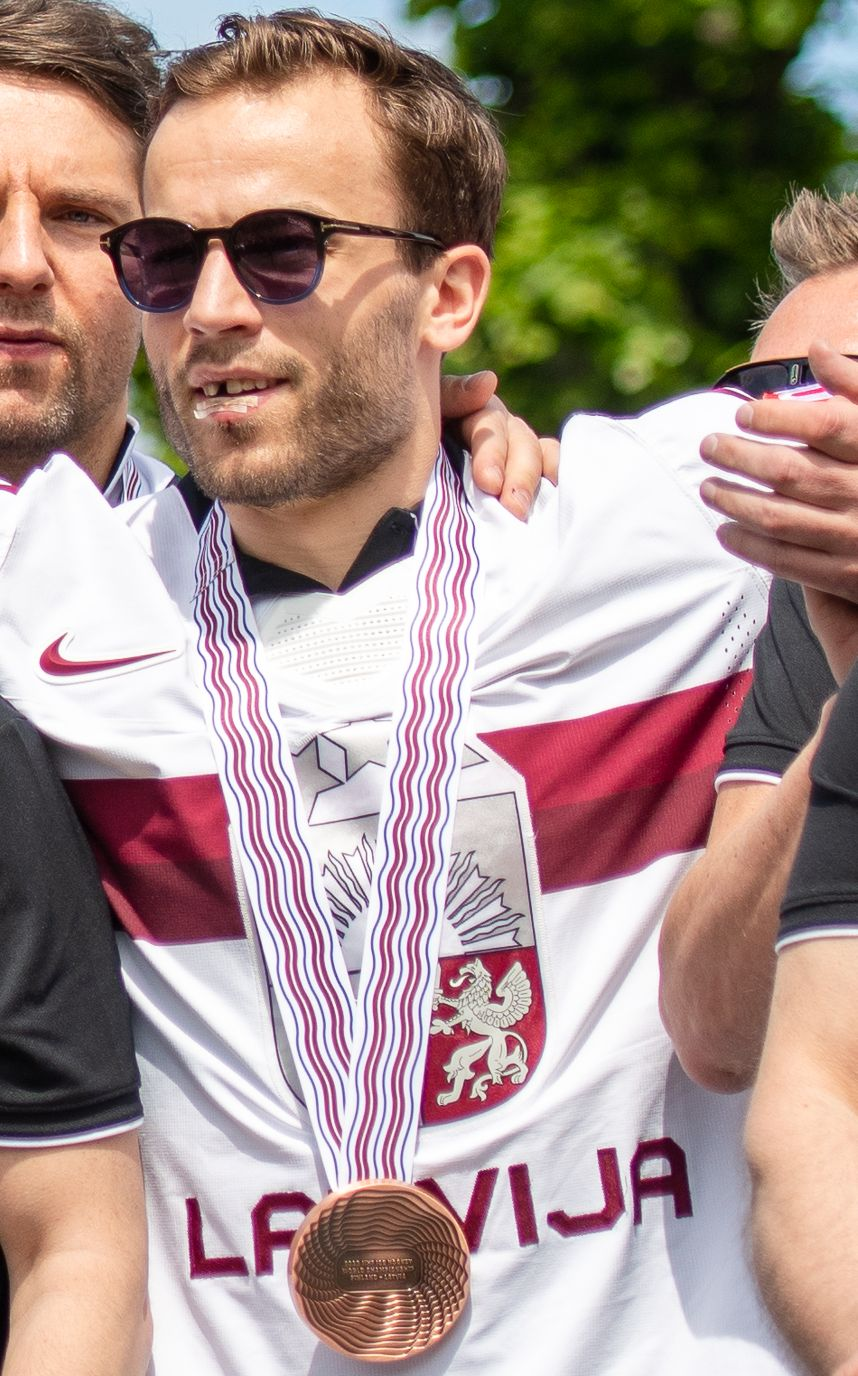
- Jānis Jaks, 2023
- Born: 22 August 1995 (age 30) Riga, Latvia
- Height: 6 ft 1 in (185 cm)
- Weight: 190 lb (86 kg; 13 st 8 lb)
- Position: Defence
- Shoots: Right
- ELH team Former teams: HC Energie Karlovy Vary; Dinamo Riga; HC Sochi; HC Litvínov
- National team: Latvia
- NHL draft: Undrafted
- Playing career: 2014–present

Jānis Jaks (born 22 August 1995) is a Latvian professional ice hockey player who is a defenceman for HC Energie Karlovy Vary of the Czech Extraliga (ELH).

== Playing career ==
=== Collegiate ===
Jaks began playing for American International in the 2016–17 season and quickly established himself as a key defenceman, tallying five goals and six assists for a total of 11 points in his freshman year, with two of his goals being game-winners.

=== Professional ===
On 30 March 2020, Jaks was signed to a one-year contract with the Bakersfield Condors of the AHL for the 2020–21 season. With the commencement of the 2020–21 North American season delayed due to the COVID-19 pandemic, Jaks was signed to a try-out contract with Latvian-based KHL club, Dinamo Riga, on 23 August 2020. Jaks appeared in 17 contests with Dinamo, collecting 1 goal and 4 points before returning to the AHL and the Condors. In completing his first professional season, Jaks contributed two goals and 6 points from the blueline with the Condors.

Jaks departed North America as a free agent and inked a one-year deal to rejoin the KHL, signing with the Russian club HC Sochi on July 19, 2021.

== International play ==
Medal record

Representing Latvia

Ice hockey

World Championships
| Bronze medal – third place | 2023 Finland/Latvia | |

Jaks played for Latvia's junior team at the 2013 and 2014 World Junior Championships. He played his first game at the senior international level in the 2014 World Championships for Latvia's national team against Russia's national team.

He played for Latvia at the 2023 IIHF World Championship, contributing two goals and five assists, and helped the team secure its first-ever IIHF World Championship medal, a bronze.

== Career statistics ==
=== Regular season and playoffs ===
| | | | Regular season | | | | | Playoffs |
| Season | Team | League | GP | G | A | Pts | PIM | GP | G | A | Pts | PIM |
|---|---|---|---|---|---|---|---|---|---|---|---|---|
| 2012–13 | HK Riga | MHL | 30 | 0 | 3 | 3 | 20 | — | — | — | — | — |
| 2013–14 | HK Riga | MHL | 38 | 0 | 2 | 2 | 22 | 10 | 1 | 1 | 2 | 12 |
| 2014–15 | Rio Grande Valley Killer Bees | NAHL | 2 | 0 | 0 | 0 | 0 | — | — | — | — | — |
| 2014–15 | Minnesota Wilderness | NAHL | 41 | 2 | 11 | 13 | 63 | 11 | 1 | 1 | 2 | 4 |
| 2015–16 | Minnesota Wilderness | NAHL | 56 | 7 | 20 | 27 | 80 | 9 | 1 | 3 | 4 | 18 |
| 2016–17 | American International | AHC | 27 | 5 | 6 | 11 | 10 | — | — | — | — | — |
| 2017–18 | American International | AHC | 37 | 8 | 15 | 23 | 20 | — | — | — | — | — |
| 2018–19 | American International | AHC | 38 | 4 | 10 | 14 | 12 | — | — | — | — | — |
| 2019–20 | American International | AHC | 33 | 6 | 9 | 15 | 6 | — | — | — | — | — |
| 2020–21 | Dinamo Riga | KHL | 17 | 1 | 3 | 4 | 12 | — | — | — | — | — |
| 2020–21 | HK Zemgale | LHL | 1 | 0 | 0 | 0 | 2 | — | — | — | — | — |
| 2020–21 | Bakersfield Condors | AHL | 20 | 2 | 4 | 6 | 21 | — | — | — | — | — |
| 2021–22 | HC Sochi | KHL | 41 | 6 | 12 | 18 | 22 | — | — | — | — | — |
| 2022–23 | HC Litvínov | ELH | 47 | 8 | 17 | 25 | 28 | 3 | 0 | 2 | 2 | 0 |
| 2023–24 | HC Litvínov | ELH | 44 | 4 | 25 | 29 | 26 | 9 | 0 | 3 | 3 | 31 |
| 2024–25 | HC Energie Karlovy Vary | ELH | 50 | 10 | 14 | 24 | 25 | 11 | 2 | 3 | 5 | 12 |
| KHL totals | | | 58 | 7 | 15 | 22 | 34 | — | — | — | — | — |
| ELH totals | | | 141 | 22 | 56 | 78 | 79 | 23 | 2 | 8 | 10 | 43 |

=== International ===
| Year | Team | Event | Result | GP | G | A | Pts | PIM |
|---|---|---|---|---|---|---|---|---|
| 2013 | Latvia | U18 | 10th | 6 | 1 | 1 | 2 | 6 |
| 2014 | Latvia | WJC-D1 | 12th | 4 | 2 | 2 | 4 | 2 |
| 2014 | Latvia | WC | 11th | 3 | 0 | 0 | 0 | 0 |
| 2015 | Latvia | WJC-D1 | 13th | 5 | 1 | 1 | 2 | 12 |
| 2017 | Latvia | WC | 10th | 4 | 0 | 0 | 0 | 0 |
| 2019 | Latvia | WC | 10th | 3 | 2 | 0 | 2 | 0 |
| 2021 | Latvia | WC | 11th | 6 | 0 | 0 | 0 | 2 |
| 2021 | Latvia | OGQ | Q | 3 | 1 | 1 | 2 | 0 |
| 2022 | Latvia | OG | 11th | 4 | 0 | 0 | 0 | 2 |
| 2022 | Latvia | WC | 10th | 7 | 1 | 2 | 3 | 2 |
| 2023 | Latvia | WC | 3rd place, bronze medalist(s) | 10 | 2 | 5 | 7 | 10 |
| 2024 | Latvia | WC | 9th | 7 | 0 | 2 | 2 | 2 |
| 2024 | Latvia | OGQ | Q | 3 | 0 | 3 | 3 | 2 |
| 2025 | Latvia | WC | 10th | 7 | 0 | 2 | 2 | 2 |
| 2026 | Latvia | OG | 10th | 3 | 0 | 2 | 2 | 0 |
| Junior totals | | | | 15 | 4 | 4 | 8 | 20 |
| Senior totals | | | | 60 | 6 | 17 | 23 | 22 |

== Awards and honors ==
| Award | Year |
|---|---|
| All-Atlantic Hockey Third Team | 2017–18 |
| Atlantic Hockey All-Tournament Team | 2019 |
