= Bill Riga =

American ice hockey player and coach

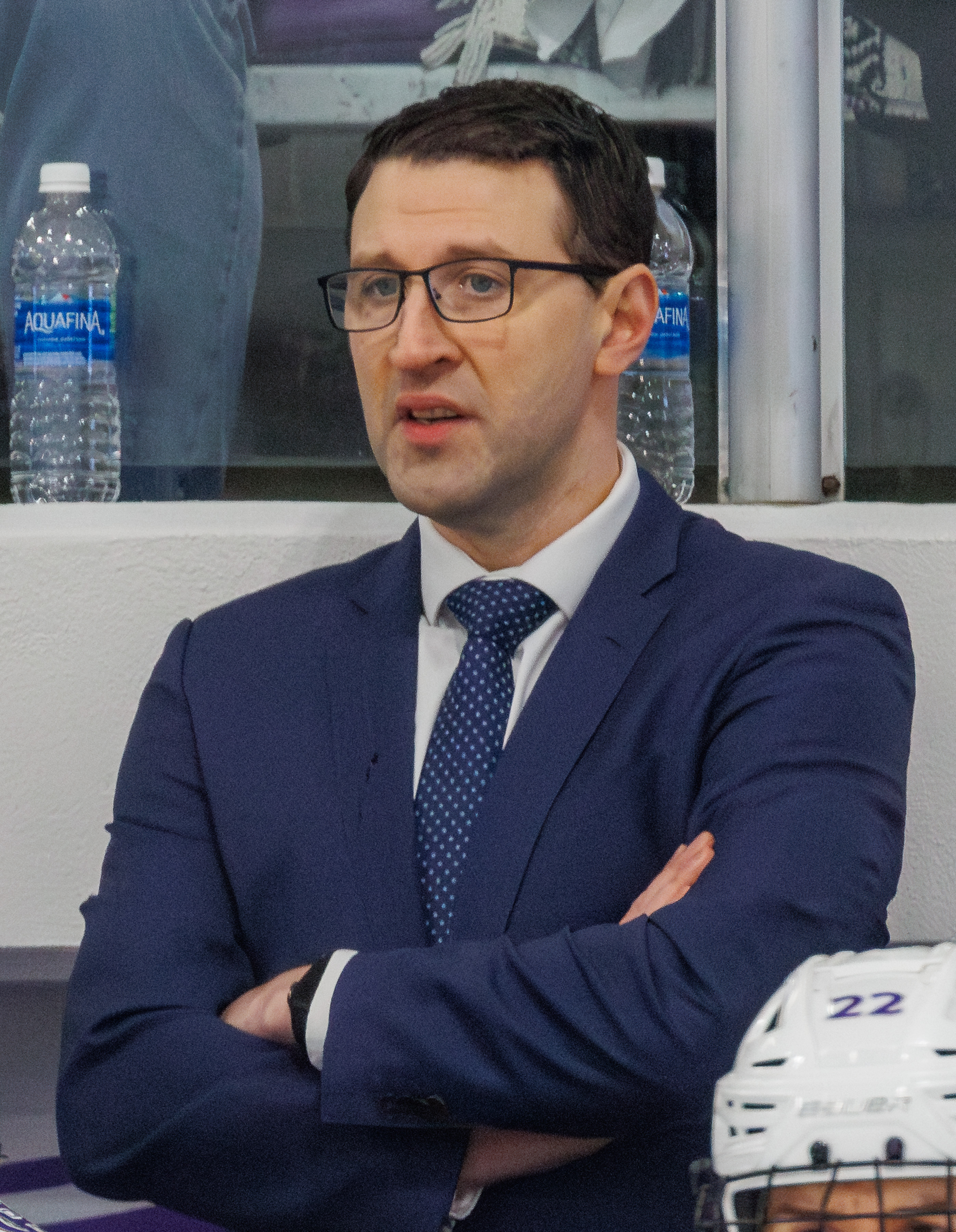

Current position
- Title: Head coach
- Team: Holy Cross
- Conference: AHA

Biographical details
- Born: May 26, 1974 (age 52); Westborough, Massachusetts, US
- Education: University of Massachusetts Lowell

Playing career
- 1992–1996: Massachusetts–Lowell
- 1996–1997: El Paso Buzzards

Coaching career (HC unless noted)
- 1996–2003: Boston Junior Bruins (assistant)
- 2003–2008: Union (assistant)
- 2008–2021: Quinnipiac (associate)
- 2021–present: Holy Cross

Head coaching record
- Overall: 92–90–13 (.505)

Accomplishments and honors

Championships
- AHA regular season (2025)

Awards
- Atlantic Hockey America Coach of the Year (2025)

William Riga (born May 26, 1974) is the current head coach for Holy Cross Crusaders men's ice hockey. Previously he was an associate head coach at Quinnipiac and helped the team reach the National Championship game in 2013 and 2016.

== Career ==
Riga began his college career in 1992 after graduating from St. Mark's School. After playing just two games as a freshman, he became a fixture on the team a depth scorer for the next three seasons. In that time he helped the team reach the NCAA Tournament twice, making the national quarterfinals on both occasions. After graduating, Riga briefly played as a professional, retiring after just 7 games and immediately turning to coach.

Riga's first job was for the Boston Junior Bruins as both the team's assistant coach and director of recruitment. He spent most of seven seasons with the team before returning to the college ranks as an assistant under new head coach Nate Leaman at Union. He remained with the Dutchmen for five years before taking the same position at Quinnipiac. Riga became the team's primary recruiter in 2012 and the Bobcats jumped from the middle of ECAC Hockey straight to the top. That year Quinnipiac won 30 games for the first time and reached the national championship game where they were defeated by in-state rival Yale. Over the course of the succeeding seven seasons, Quinnipiac remained one of the top programs in the country, finishing atop their conference four times and making five further NCAA tournament appearances.

After the resignation of David Berard in 2021, Holy Cross hired Riga as the program's 7th head coach.

== Statistics ==
=== Regular season and playoffs ===
			Regular season					Playoffs
Season	Team	League	GP	G	A	Pts	PIM	GP	G	A	Pts	PIM
1991–92	St. Mark's School	US-Prep	—	—	—	—	—	—	—	—	—	—
1992–93	Massachusetts–Lowell	Hockey East	2	0	1	1	0	—	—	—	—	—
1993–94	Massachusetts–Lowell	Hockey East	26	3	5	8	12	—	—	—	—	—
1994–95	Massachusetts–Lowell	Hockey East	32	5	4	9	10	—	—	—	—	—
1995–96	Massachusetts–Lowell	Hockey East	35	4	8	12	12	—	—	—	—	—
1996–97	El Paso Buzzards	WPHL	7	1	1	2	0	—	—	—	—	—
NCAA totals			95	12	18	30	34	—	—	—	—	—

== Head coaching record ==
Record table
Season	Team	Overall	Conference	Standing	Postseason
Holy Cross Crusaders (Atlantic Hockey) (2021–2024)
2021–22	Holy Cross	12–23–2 (.351)	10–14–2 (.423)	10th	Atlantic Hockey First Round
2022–23	Holy Cross	17–21–3 (.451)	12–12–2 (.500)	7th	Atlantic Hockey Runner-Up
2023–24	Holy Cross	21–14–4 (.590)	13–10–3 (.558)	2nd	Atlantic Hockey Semifinals
Holy Cross:		50–58–9 (.466)	35–36–7 (.494)		
Holy Cross Crusaders (AHA) (2024–present)
2024–25	Holy Cross	24–14–2 (.625)	19–5–2 (.769)	1st	AHA Runner-up
2025–26	Holy Cross	18–18–2 (.500)	14–10–2 (.577)	T–3rd	AHA Semifinals
Holy Cross:		42–32–4 (.564)	33–15–4 (.673)		
Total:		92–90–13 (.505)			
National champion Postseason invitational champion Conference regular season champion Conference regular season and conference tournament champion Division regular season champion Division regular season and conference tournament champion Conference tournament champion

Awards and achievements
Preceded by Inaugural	Atlantic Hockey America men's Coach of the Year; 2024–25	Succeeded by Andy Jones
