= 2022–23 Niagara Purple Eagles men's ice hockey season =

- Conference: 6th Atlantic Hockey
- Home ice: Dwyer Arena

Rankings
- USCHO: NR
- USA Today: NR

Record
- Overall: 19–18–3
- Conference: 10–13–3
- Home: 7–6–2
- Road: 12–12–1

Coaches and captains
- Head coach: Jason Lammers
- Assistant coaches: Ian Burt; Mark Phalon

The 2022–23 Niagara Purple Eagles men's ice hockey season was the 27th season of play for the program, the 25th at the Division I level, and the 13th in the Atlantic Hockey conference. The Purple Eagles represented Niagara University and were coached by Jason Lammers, in his 6th season.

== Season ==
The Purple Eagles kicked off their season with a trip west that resulted in a surprise sweep of Omaha. While riding high on the rare victories, the defense slipped after the team returned home and allowed nearly 5 goals against per game over the next five games. Niagara recovered by the end of October and then went on a 5-game winning streak to pull themselves out of the Atlantic Hockey cellar. Due to expected heavy snowfall in the Buffalo area, the game against St. Lawrence was moved from November 19 to January 5.

Niagara ended the first half of the season with a sluggish performance by their offense but they still possessed a winning record. The Purple Eagles opened the second half by splitting a pair of non-conference series. Unfortunately, the team remained inconsistent for the remainder of the year. While they were able to sweep a ranked RIT squad, they were in turn dropped by both Bentley and Holy Cross in the back half of the year. The result was that Niagara finished 6th in the conference standings despite seeing improvements across the board.

The team began the postseason on the road and dropped the first match to Sacred Heart. Afterwards, Chad Veltri turned in a masterful performance in goal and allowed just 4 goals on 70 shots. Carter Randklev's 5-point effort in the deciding game sent the Purple Eagles into the semifinal where the team faced local rival Canisius. Veltri continued to stand on his head and led the Purple Eagles to a 2–1 victory over the Golden Griffins. Ordinarily, that would have been enough to send the team to the league championship, however, Atlantic Hockey had changed the playoff format prior to the season. WHile the First Round games had been eliminated, the semifinal round was extended to be a best-of-three series like the quarterfinal. This meant that Niagara had to win a second match against Canisius to advance. Unfortunately, the Griffins were able to rally from the loss in game 1 and stormed back with two wins to knock Niagara out of the postseason.

While the end of their campaign was disappointing, the team had taken a big stride forward. Niagara had scored 37 more goals and though they allowed 7 more goals against, they had done so in 4 additional games. The Purple Eagles also posted their first winning season in a decade; a successful season despite the ending.

== Departures ==
Player	Position	Nationality	Cause
Michael Corson	Goaltender	United States	Graduation (retired)
Luke Edgerton	Forward	United States	Graduation (retired)
Mike Faulkner	Defenseman	United States	Graduation (retired)
Chris Harpur	Defenseman	Canada	Graduation (signed with Orlando Solar Bears)
Zac Herrmann	Defenseman	United States	Graduation (signed with Cincinnati Cyclones)
Jonathan Hill	Forward	United States	Graduation (retired)
Trevor Poeze	Forward	Canada	Left program (retired)
Jesse Pomeroy	Defenseman	Canada	Left program (retired)
Trevor Poeze	Forward	Canada	Left program (retired)
Alexandre Roy	Defenseman	Canada	Left program (retired)
Walker Sommer	Forward	United States	Graduation (signed with Wichita Thunder)
Jack Zielinski	Defenseman	United States	Graduation (retired)

== Recruiting ==
Player	Position	Nationality	Age	Notes
Lucas Bahn	Defenseman	United States	23	Hendersonville, TN; transfer from Alabama–Huntsville
Lane Brockhoff	Defenseman	Canada	22	Edberg, AB
Casey Carreau	Forward	United States	24	Acushnet, MA; transfer from Boston College
Mike Egan	Forward	United States	25	Billerica, MA; graduate transfer from Babson
Noah Hackett	Forward	Canada	20	Ponoka, AB
Ethan Lund	Defenseman	Canada	21	Calgary, AB
Ryan Ouellette	Goaltender	Sweden	21	Colorado Springs, CO; transfer from Wisconsin–Eau Claire
David Posma	Defenseman	United States	19	Pomona, NY
Gļebs Prohorenkovs	Forward	Latvia	20	Riga, LAT
Max Ruoho	Defenseman	United States	23	Madison, WI
Drew Vieten	Forward	United States	21	Calabasas, CA
Johnny Wescoe	Forward	United States	21	Mechanicsburg, PA
Jonathan Ziskie	Defenseman	United States	21	Macomb, MI

== Roster ==
As of June 30, 2022.

No.	Nat.	Player	Class	Pos	Height	Weight	DoB	Hometown	Previous team	NHL rights
2	(United States)	Jonathan Ziskie	Freshman	F	6' 3" (1.91 m)	187 lb (85 kg)	2001-03-19	Macomb, Michigan	Bismarck Bobcats (NAHL)	—
3	(United States)	Lucas Bahn	Senior	D	5' 11" (1.8 m)	174 lb (79 kg)	1999-09-11	Henderson, Tennessee	Alabama–Huntsville (NCAA)	—
4	(Latvia)	Gļebs Prohorenkovs	Freshman	F	6' 2" (1.88 m)	187 lb (85 kg)	2001-11-12	Riga, Latvia	Amarillo Wranglers (NAHL)	—
5	(United States)	Noah Carlin	Sophomore	D	6' 0" (1.83 m)	174 lb (79 kg)	2000-06-13	Marine City, Michigan	Omaha Lancers (USHL)	—
7	(United States)	Jordan Wishman	Graduate	D	6' 1" (1.85 m)	187 lb (85 kg)	1998-11-22	Des Moines, Iowa	Dubuque Fighting Saints (USHL)	—
8	(Sweden)	Albin Nilsson	Senior	F	6' 0" (1.83 m)	190 lb (86 kg)	1998-09-18	Ljungby, Sweden	Providence (HEA)	—
9	(United States)	Jay Ahearn	Sophomore	F	5' 11" (1.8 m)	170 lb (77 kg)	2001-05-23	Staten Island, New York	Johnstown Tomahawks (NAHL)	—
10	(United States)	Carter Randklev	Junior	F	5' 8" (1.73 m)	163 lb (74 kg)	1999-11-05	Moorhead, Minnesota	Fargo Force (USHL)	—
11	(Canada)	Olivier Gauthier	Junior	F	5' 10" (1.78 m)	185 lb (84 kg)	1999-04-09	Ferme-Neuve, Quebec	Alaska Anchorage (WCHA)	—
12	(Canada)	Jason Pineo	Senior	F	6' 2" (1.88 m)	200 lb (91 kg)	1998-02-23	Toronto, Ontario	Oakville Blades (OJHL)	—
13	(United States)	Drew Vieten	Freshman	F	6' 1" (1.85 m)	190 lb (86 kg)	2001-01-10	Calabasas, California	Wichita Falls Warriors (NAHL)	—
14	(United States)	Ryan Naumovski	Senior	F	6' 0" (1.83 m)	150 lb (68 kg)	1999-07-28	Shelby Township, Michigan	New Jersey Titans (NAHL)	—
15	(United States)	Matt Cameron	Junior	F	5' 11" (1.8 m)	185 lb (84 kg)	2000-06-08	Berwyn, Pennsylvania	New Jersey Titans (NAHL)	—
16	(Canada)	Zane Kindrachuk	Sophomore	F	5' 9" (1.75 m)	161 lb (73 kg)	2000-01-04	Calgary, Alberta	Okotoks Oilers (AJHL)	—
17	(United States)	Max Ruoho	Freshman	D	6' 0" (1.83 m)	174 lb (79 kg)	2001-03-05	Madison, Wisconsin	Minnesota Wilderness (NAHL)	—
18	(United States)	Mike Egan	Graduate	F	5' 11" (1.8 m)	181 lb (82 kg)	1997-08-24	Billerica, Massachusetts	Babson (NEHC)	—
19	(Canada)	Ryan Cox	Graduate	F	5' 11" (1.8 m)	180 lb (82 kg)	1998-07-23	St. Albert, Alberta	Sherwood Park Crusaders (AJHL)	—
20	(United States)	Christian Gorsack	Junior	F	5' 11" (1.8 m)	183 lb (83 kg)	2000-06-08	Jeannette, Pennsylvania	Johnstown Tomahawks (NAHL)	—
21	(United States)	Shane Ott	Sophomore	F	6' 1" (1.85 m)	181 lb (82 kg)	2000-07-21	Centennial, Colorado	Janesville Jets (NAHL)	—
22	(Canada)	Lane Brockhoff	Sophomore	D	6' 1" (1.85 m)	207 lb (94 kg)	2000-04-11	Edberg, Alberta	Camrose Kodiaks (AJHL)	—
23	(Norway)	Lars Rødne	Sophomore	F	6' 0" (1.83 m)	181 lb (82 kg)	2000-07-22	Stavanager, Norway	Bismarck Bobcats (NAHL)	—
24	(Czech Republic)	Josef Myšák	Junior	D	6' 3" (1.91 m)	215 lb (98 kg)	1999-09-08	Litvínov, Czech Republic	Austin Bruins (NAHL)	—
25	(United States)	Johnny Wescoe	Freshman	F	5' 8" (1.73 m)	150 lb (68 kg)	2001-01-06	Mechanicsburg, Pennsylvania	Rockets Hockey Club (NCDC)	—
26	(Canada)	Brandon Stanley	Graduate	F	6' 2" (1.88 m)	202 lb (92 kg)	1997-05-03	Sioux Lookout, Ontario	Philadelphia Rebels (NAHL)	—
27	(United States)	Jack DeBoer	Graduate	F	6' 3" (1.91 m)	202 lb (92 kg)	2000-08-17	Madison, New Jersey	Boston University (HEA)	—
28	(Canada)	Ethan Lund	Freshman	D	5' 10" (1.78 m)	185 lb (84 kg)	2001-03-16	Calgary, Alberta	Brooks Bandits (AJHL)	—
29	(United States)	David Posma	Freshman	D	6' 0" (1.83 m)	170 lb (77 kg)	2003-08-27	Pomona, New York	New Jersey Titans (NAHL)	—
30	(United States)	Jake Sibell	Sophomore	G	6' 2" (1.88 m)	205 lb (93 kg)	2000-01-03	Isanti, Minnesota	Aberdeen Wings (NAHL)	—
31	(United States)	Chad Veltri	Senior	G	5' 11" (1.8 m)	187 lb (85 kg)	1998-06-03	Pittsburgh, Pennsylvania	Youngstown Phantoms (USHL)	—
34	(Canada)	Noah Hackett	Freshman	F	6' 1" (1.85 m)	174 lb (79 kg)	2001-12-11	Ponoka, Alberta	Brooks Bandits (AJHL)	—
37	(United States)	Casey Carreau	Senior	F	5' 9" (1.75 m)	185 lb (84 kg)	1998-08-03	Acushnet, Massachusetts	Boston College (HEA)	—
40	(United States)	Ryan Ouellette	Sophomore	G	6' 0" (1.83 m)	185 lb (84 kg)	2000-12-06	Colorado Springs, Colorado	Wisconsin–Eau Claire (WIAC)	—

== Standings ==
2022–23 Atlantic Hockey Standings
	Conference record										Overall record					
	GP	W	L	T	OW	OL	SW	PTS	GF	GA	GP	W	L	T	GF	GA
RIT †	26	18	7	1	1	3	0	57	85	55	39	25	13	1	127	100
American International	26	14	8	4	2	0	3	47	87	62	39	18	14	7	124	98
Sacred Heart	26	14	9	3	2	0	2	45	87	72	37	17	17	3	107	112
Canisius *	26	13	10	3	3	1	1	41	76	71	42	20	19	3	118	119
Army	26	12	12	2	3	3	1	39	72	81	37	14	19	4	98	119
Niagara	26	10	13	3	0	3	2	38	73	86	40	19	18	3	119	129
Holy Cross	26	12	12	2	3	1	1	37	73	71	41	17	21	3	98	119
Mercyhurst	26	9	14	3	1	5	1	35	77	80	36	10	23	3	98	122
Bentley	26	8	16	2	1	1	1	27	61	89	34	11	21	2	81	124
Air Force	26	8	17	1	1	0	0	24	63	87	36	12	22	2	95	128
Championship: March 18, 2023 † indicates conference regular season champion (DeGregorio Trophy) * indicates conference tournament champion (Riley Trophy); Rankings: USCHO.com Top 20 Poll

== Schedule and results ==
Date	Time	Opponent^{#}	Rank^{#}	Site	TV	Decision	Result	Attendance	Record
Regular Season
October 7	8:00 PM	at Omaha*		Baxter Arena • Omaha, Nebraska		Veltri	W 4–3	5,748	1–0–0
October 8	8:00 PM	at Omaha*		Baxter Arena • Omaha, Nebraska		Veltri	W 4–3	5,567	2–0–0
October 14	7:00 PM	American International		Dwyer Arena • Lewiston, New York	FloHockey	Veltri	L 3–6	903	2–1–0 (0–1–0)
October 15	5:30 PM	American International		Dwyer Arena • Lewiston, New York	FloHockey	Ouellette	L 2–5	511	2–2–0 (0–2–0)
October 21	7:30 PM	Sacred Heart		Dwyer Arena • Lewiston, New York	FloHockey	Sibell	W 6–4	704	3–2–0 (1–2–0)
October 22	5:30 PM	Sacred Heart		Dwyer Arena • Lewiston, New York	FloHockey	Sibell	L 1–5	661	3–3–0 (1–3–0)
October 28	7:35 PM	Mercyhurst		Dwyer Arena • Lewiston, New York	FloHockey	Veltri	T 4–4 ^{SOW}	708	3–3–1 (1–3–1)
October 29	7:00 PM	at Mercyhurst		Mercyhurst Ice Center • Erie, Pennsylvania	FloHockey	Veltri	W 3–2	612	4–3–1 (2–3–1)
November 4	7:05 PM	at Bentley		Bentley Arena • Waltham, Massachusetts	FloHockey	Veltri	W 6–0	1,267	5–3–1 (3–3–1)
November 5	5:00 PM	at Bentley		Bentley Arena • Waltham, Massachusetts	FloHockey	Veltri	W 4–2	1,178	6–3–1 (4–3–1)
November 18	7:00 PM	USNTDP*		Dwyer Arena • Lewiston, New York (Exhibition)		Veltri	W 8–5	849	
November 25	3:30 PM	Colgate*		Dwyer Arena • Lewiston, New York	FloHockey	Veltri	W 3–2	496	7–3–1
November 26	3:30 PM	Colgate*		Dwyer Arena • Lewiston, New York	FloHockey	Veltri	W 3–2 ^{OT}	527	8–3–1
December 2	7:00 PM	at Army		Tate Rink • West Point, New York	FloHockey	Veltri	L 0–3	1,846	8–4–1 (4–4–1)
December 3	4:00 PM	at Army		Tate Rink • West Point, New York	FloHockey	Veltri	W 4–2	1,319	9–4–1 (5–4–1)
December 8	5:05 PM	at American International		MassMutual Center • Springfield, Massachusetts	FloHockey	Veltri	T 0–0 ^{SOW}	-	9–4–2 (5–4–2)
December 9	1:05 PM	at American International		MassMutual Center • Springfield, Massachusetts	FloHockey	Veltri	L 1–4	296	9–5–2 (5–5–2)
December 30	7:00 PM	at Miami*		Steve Cady Arena • Oxford, Ohio		Veltri	L 3–5	2,007	9–6–2
December 31	4:00 PM	at Miami*		Steve Cady Arena • Oxford, Ohio		Veltri	W 5–4	1,254	10–6–2
January 2	3:00 PM	Toronto*		Dwyer Arena • Lewiston, New York (Exhibition)	FloHockey	Ouellette	W 3–1	437	
January 5	7:00 PM	St. Lawrence*		Dwyer Arena • Lewiston, New York	FloHockey	Veltri	W 4–3	437	11–6–2
January 7	7:00 PM	at St. Lawrence*		Appleton Arena • Canton, New York	ESPN+	Veltri	L 3–4 ^{OT}	1,216	11–7–2
January 13	7:00 PM	Bentley		Dwyer Arena • Lewiston, New York	FloHockey	Veltri	L 3–6	587	11–8–2 (5–6–2)
January 14	5:30 PM	Bentley		Dwyer Arena • Lewiston, New York	FloHockey	Veltri	L 1–6	625	11–9–2 (5–7–2)
January 20	9:05 PM	at Air Force		Cadet Ice Arena • Colorado Springs, Colorado	FloHockey	Veltri	L 3–6	1,465	11–10–2 (5–8–2)
January 21	7:05 PM	at Air Force		Cadet Ice Arena • Colorado Springs, Colorado	Altitude	Veltri	W 2–1	1,735	12–10–2 (6–8–2)
January 27	7:00 PM	at Canisius		LECOM Harborcenter • Buffalo, New York	FloHockey	Veltri	L 2–5	1,236	12–11–2 (6–9–2)
January 28	7:00 PM	at Canisius		LECOM Harborcenter • Buffalo, New York	FloHockey	Veltri	W 5–2	1,121	13–11–2 (7–9–2)
February 3	7:00 PM	Army		Dwyer Arena • Lewiston, New York	FloHockey	Veltri	L 2–3 ^{OT}	678	13–12–2 (7–10–2)
February 4	5:30 PM	Army		Dwyer Arena • Lewiston, New York	FloHockey	Veltri	T 3–3 ^{SOW}	541	13–12–3 (7–10–3)
February 10	7:00 PM	#18 RIT		Dwyer Arena • Lewiston, New York	FloHockey	Veltri	W 4–3	533	14–12–3 (8–10–3)
February 11	7:00 PM	#18 RIT		Dwyer Arena • Lewiston, New York	FloHockey	Veltri	W 4–1	909	15–12–3 (9–10–3)
February 17	7:00 PM	at Holy Cross		Hart Center • Worcester, Massachusetts	FloHockey	Veltri	L 3–4	475	15–13–3 (9–11–3)
February 18	7:00 PM	at Holy Cross		Hart Center • Worcester, Massachusetts	FloHockey	Veltri	L 0–3	480	15–14–3 (9–12–3)
February 24	7:05 PM	at Mercyhurst		Mercyhurst Ice Center • Erie, Pennsylvania	FloHockey	Veltri	L 2–3	783	15–15–3 (9–13–3)
February 25	7:00 PM	Mercyhurst		Dwyer Arena • Lewiston, New York	FloHockey	Veltri	W 5–3	1,115	16–15–3 (10–13–3)
Atlantic Hockey Tournament
March 3	7:00 PM	at Sacred Heart*		Martire Family Arena • Fairfield, Connecticut (Quarterfinal Game 1)	FloHockey	Veltri	L 1–3	2,046	16–16–3
March 4	7:00 PM	at Sacred Heart*		Martire Family Arena • Fairfield, Connecticut (Quarterfinal Game 2)	FloHockey	Veltri	W 4–1	2,088	17–16–3
March 5	7:00 PM	at Sacred Heart*		Martire Family Arena • Fairfield, Connecticut (Quarterfinal Game 3)	FloHockey	Veltri	W 7–3	1,196	18–16–3
March 10	6:05 PM	at Canisius*		LECOM Harborcenter • Buffalo, New York (Semifinal Game 1)	FloHockey	Veltri	W 2–1	546	19–16–3
March 11	7:35 PM	at Canisius*		LECOM Harborcenter • Buffalo, New York (Semifinal Game 2)	FloHockey	Veltri	L 1–5	500	19–17–3
March 12	7:05 PM	at Canisius*		LECOM Harborcenter • Buffalo, New York (Semifinal Game 3)	FloHockey	Veltri	L 2–4	457	19–18–3
*Non-conference game. ^{#}Rankings from USCHO.com Poll. All times are in Eastern Time. Source:

== Scoring statistics ==
Name	Position	Games	Goals	Assists	Points	PIM
Casey Carreau	F	40	10	21	31	16
Ryan Cox	F	40	14	14	28	38
Shane Ott	F	40	10	18	28	6
Ryan Naumovski	F	40	9	17	26	10
Carter Randklev	F	38	13	11	24	16
Albin Nilsson	C	40	10	14	24	49
Jason Pineo	C	40	9	13	22	33
Gļebs Prohorenkovs	F	35	12	6	18	28
Olivier Gauthier	LW	40	11	6	17	10
Jay Ahearn	F	17	7	10	17	16
Josef Myšák	D	39	3	14	17	45
Lars Christian Rødne	LW	37	6	7	13	16
Noah Carlin	D	33	1	11	12	27
Christian Gorscak	F	26	1	6	7	4
Lucas Bahn	D	40	1	6	7	12
Max Ruoho	D	22	0	7	7	6
David Posma	D	37	0	5	5	67
Jonathan Ziskie	D	31	1	3	4	14
Lane Brockhoff	D	30	0	4	4	39
Mike Egan	F	6	1	0	1	0
Johnny Wescoe	F	10	0	1	1	2
Drew Vieten	F	11	0	1	1	9
Jack DeBoer	C	14	0	1	1	0
Brandon Stanley	F	19	0	1	1	0
Jordan Wishman	D	19	0	1	1	20
Chad Veltri	G	37	0	1	1	0
Jake Sibell	G	2	0	0	0	6
Ryan Ouellette	G	2	0	0	0	0
Noah Hackett	F	3	0	0	0	0
Ethan Lund	D	13	0	0	0	12
Total			119	200	319	495

== Goaltending statistics ==
Name	Games	Minutes	Wins	Losses	Ties	Goals against	Saves	Shut outs	SV %	GAA
Chad Veltri	37	2179:44	18	16	3	101	973	2	.906	2.78
Jake Sibell	3	118:09	1	1	0	7	42	0	.857	3.55
Ryan Ouellette	3	97:51	0	1	0	7	38	0	.844	4.29
Empty Net	-	29:17	-	-	-	1	-	-	-	-
Total	40	2425:03	19	18	3	116	1053	2	.902	2.87

== Rankings ==
Poll	Week																											
Poll	Pre	1	2	3	4	5	6	7	8	9	10	11	12	13	14	15	16	17	18	19	20	21	22	23	24	25	26	27 (Final)
USCHO.com	NR	-	NR	NR	NR	NR	NR	NR	NR	NR	NR	NR	NR	-	NR	NR	NR	NR	NR	NR	NR	NR	NR	NR	NR	NR	-	NR
USA Today	NR	NR	NR	NR	NR	NR	NR	NR	NR	NR	NR	NR	NR	NR	NR	NR	NR	NR	NR	NR	NR	NR	NR	NR	NR	NR	NR	NR

Note: USCHO did not release a poll in weeks 1, 13, or 26.
