= Atlantic Hockey America men's Coach of the Year =

Atlantic Hockey America Coach of the Year
- Sport: Ice hockey
- Awarded for: The Coach of the Year in Atlantic Hockey America

History
- First award: 2025
- Most recent: Andy Jones

The Atlantic Hockey America Coach of the Year is an annual award given out at the conclusion of the Atlantic Hockey America regular season to the best coach in the conference.

The Coach of the Year was first awarded in 2025, and is a successor to the Atlantic Hockey Coach of the Year, which was discontinued after the conference merged with the women-only College Hockey America.

== Award winners ==
Year	Winner	School	Ref
2024–25	Bill Riga	Holy Cross	
2025–26	Andy Jones	Bentley	

=== Winners by school ===
School	Winners
Bentley	1
Holy Cross	1

== See also ==
- Atlantic Hockey Coach of the Year
