= Jason Lammers =

American ice hockey coach and former player (born 1975)

Current position
- Title: Head coach
- Team: Niagara
- Conference: Atlantic Hockey America
- Record: 130–172–28 (.436)

Biographical details
- Born: September 11, 1975 (age 51); Pittsburgh, Pennsylvania
- Education: State University of New York at Geneseo

Playing career
- 1994–1998: Geneseo State
- 1998–2000: Idaho Steelheads
- 1999–2000: Phoenix Mustangs
- Position: Defenceman

Coaching career (HC unless noted)
- 2000–2001: Clarkson (volunteer assistant)
- 2001–2002: Hobart (assistant)
- 2002–2003: Clarkson (assistant)
- 2003–2004: Alaska (assistant)
- 2004–2005: Princeton (assistant)
- 2005–2006: Geneseo State
- 2006–2009: Ohio State (assistant)
- 2009–2011: Colorado College (assistant)
- 2011–2015: Massachusetts–Lowell (assistant)
- 2015–2017: Dubuque Fighting Saints
- 2017–present: Niagara

Head coaching record
- Overall: 149–181–30 (.456) [college] 75–36–9 (.663) [USHL]
- Tournaments: 0–1 (D-III)

Accomplishments and honors

Championships
- 2006 SUNYAC Tournament; 2016 USHL Eastern Conference

Jason Lammers (born September 11, 1975) is an American ice hockey coach and former player. He was named as the third coach for Niagara in the spring of 2017.

== Career ==
The Pittsburgh native played for the ice hockey team for four seasons while attending SUNY-Geneseo. After graduating with a BA in history he played two seasons as a professional in the now-defunct WCHL(West Coast Hockey League).

Lammers started his coaching career in 2000 as a volunteer assistant with Clarkson before taking a full-time assistant position with Hobart the following year. The Golden Knights lured him back a year later as an assistant but after head coach Mark Morris was fired mid-season Lammers was on the move once again. He spent one season at both Alaska and Princeton before receiving his first head coaching job with his alma mater. Lammers led Geneseo to a 19–9–2 record, winning the SUNYAC tournament for the second year in a row.

He didn't stick around to build on the success, however, leaving to join the staff at Ohio State in 2006. With the Buckeyes Lammers finally found a home for longer than a year, remaining with the program for three seasons before accepting a similar post with Colorado College for two seasons. He had a four year stint with Massachusetts–Lowell under Norm Bazin, helping the team reach the 2013 Frozen Four, before he got his second head coaching gig, this time with the Dubuque Fighting Saints.

In his first season with the team Lammers got the junior squad to post a 39–19–1 record and make it all the way to the Clark Cup Final. His second campaign was only slightly less successful as the Fighting Saints made the Eastern Conference Final. After the season Lammers was hired as the head coach for Niagara, replacing Dave Burkholder.

== Head coaching record ==
=== College ===
Record table
Season	Team	Overall	Conference	Standing	Postseason
Geneseo State Ice Knights (SUNYAC) (2005–2006)
2005–06	Geneseo State	19–9–2	10–4–0	2nd	NCAA First Round
SUNY-Geneseo:		19–9–2	10–4–0		
Niagara Purple Eagles (Atlantic Hockey) (2017–2024)
2017–18	Niagara	11–22–3	10–15–3	10th	Atlantic Hockey First Round
2018–19	Niagara	17–19–5	11–12–5	6th	Atlantic Hockey Runner-Up
2019–20	Niagara	12–18–4	12–12–4	5th	Tournament Cancelled
2020–21	Niagara	7–12–3	3–9–3	9th	Atlantic Hockey Semifinals
2021–22	Niagara	11–22–3	10–13–3	T–8th	Atlantic Hockey First Round
2022–23	Niagara	19–18–3	10–13–3	6th	Atlantic Hockey Semifinals
2023–24	Niagara	18–18–3	13–10–3	T–6th	Atlantic Hockey Semifinals
Niagara:		95–129–24	69–84–24		
Niagara Purple Eagles (AHA) (2024–present)
2024–25	Niagara	18–16–3	16–9–1	4th	AHA Quarterfinals
2025–26	Niagara	13–23–1	9–16–1	8th	AHA Quarterfinals
2026–27	Niagara	4–4–0	1–1–0		
Niagara:		35–43–4	26–26–2		
Total:		149–181–30			
National champion Postseason invitational champion Conference regular season champion Conference regular season and conference tournament champion Division regular season champion Division regular season and conference tournament champion Conference tournament champion
