= List of Atlantic Hockey America men's All-Tournament Teams =

The Atlantic Hockey America men's All-Tournament Team is an annual honor bestowed at the conclusion of the NCAA Division I Atlantic Hockey America men's ice hockey tournament to the players judged to have performed the best during the championship. The team is composed of three forwards, two defensemen and one goaltender with additional players named in the event of a tie.

== 2020s ==
2025
Player	Pos	Team
Liam McLinskey	F	Holy Cross
A. J. Hodges	F	Bentley
Nik Armstrong-Kingkade	F	Bentley
Mac Gadowsky	D	Army
Nick Bochen	D	Bentley
Connor Hasley	G	Bentley

2026
Player	Pos	Team
Michael Mesic	F	Bentley
Marcus Joughin	F	Sacred Heart
Kellan Hjartarson	F	Bentley
David Helledy	D	Bentley
John Babcock	D	Robert Morris
Lukas Swedein	G	Bentley

== All-Tournament Team players by school ==
School	Winners
Bentley	8
Army	1
Holy Cross	1
Robert Morris	1
Sacred Heart	1

== Multiple appearances ==
None

== See also ==
- Atlantic Hockey Awards
- Atlantic Hockey Most Valuable Player in Tournament
