= 2026 Atlantic Hockey America men's tournament =

2026 Atlantic Hockey America men's ice hockey tournament
- Dates: March 3–March 21, 2025
- Teams: 10
- Finals site: Bentley Arena; Waltham, Massachusetts
- Champions: Bentley (2nd title)
- Winning coach: Andy Jones (2nd title)
- MVP: Michael Mesic, Kellan Hjartarson (Bentley)
- Atlantic Hockey America men's Ice Hockey Tournaments

The 2026 Atlantic Hockey America Tournament is the 2nd edition of the Atlantic Hockey America Tournament. It is played between March 3 and March 21, 2026.

== Format ==
This tournament featured four rounds of play, with all ten conference teams participating. The top six teams, according to the conference standings, received byes to the quarterfinal round. The remaining four teams were arranged so that the seventh seed played the tenth seed while the eighth seed played the ninth seed in first round matches. The winners of the first-round games were reseeded for the quarterfinal round with the new eighth- and seventh-seeded teams facing the first- and second-place teams respectively in . The other quarterfinal series included the fourth- and fifth-overall seeds and the third- and sixth-overall seeds. The winners of the quarterfinal round were then reseeded so that the top remaining seed played the lowest remaining seed while the other two semifinalists met. The winners of the semifinal matches advanced to the championship to determine which team received the conference's automatic bid to the 2026 NCAA Division I men's ice hockey tournament. The quarterfinal and semifinal rounds were best-of-three series while the championship and first round matches were single elimination. All matchups were hosted by the higher-seeded team.

== Conference standings ==
2025–26 Atlantic Hockey America Standings
	Conference record										Overall record					
	GP	W	L	T	OW	OL	SW	PTS	GF	GA	GP	W	L	T	GF	GA
#20 Bentley †*	26	16	6	4	1	0	2	53	85	56	39	23	11	5	122	89
Sacred Heart	26	15	8	3	1	0	1	48	80	61	40	23	14	3	118	96
Robert Morris	26	13	11	2	0	2	2	45	69	69	40	16	21	3	103	128
Holy Cross	26	14	10	2	1	1	1	45	81	69	38	18	18	2	113	116
RIT	26	13	11	2	2	1	2	42	69	68	36	17	17	2	93	96
Air Force	26	13	10	3	2	1	0	41	75	73	37	18	15	4	108	112
Canisius	26	12	12	2	1	0	2	39	81	74	35	17	16	2	107	105
Niagara	26	9	16	1	1	3	0	30	67	83	37	13	23	1	93	118
Army	26	7	15	4	2	3	2	28	61	75	35	12	17	6	91	96
Mercyhurst	26	5	18	3	0	0	1	19	47	87	37	6	28	3	65	143
Championship: March 21, 2026 † indicates conference regular season champion (DeGregorio Trophy) * indicates conference tournament champion (Riley Trophy); Rankings: USCHO.com Top 20 Poll; updated March 22, 2026; Source: AHA

== Bracket ==
Note: Teams are reseeded after the First Round and Quarterfinals.

First Round; March 3
7	Canisius	2
10	Mercyhurst	5
8	Niagara	5
9	Army	4

Quarterfinals; March 6–8
1	Bentley	4***	6	-
10	Mercyhurst	3	0	-
2	Sacred Heart	3	2	-
8	Niagara	1	1	-
3	Robert Morris	2	4	5
6	Air Force	3**	1	2
4	Holy Cross	2*	5*	-
5	RIT	1	4	-

Semifinals; March 13–15
1	Bentley	3*	4	-
4	Holy Cross	2	0	-
2	Sacred Heart	5	2	5
3	Robert Morris	1	5	0

Championship; March 21
1	Bentley	3
2	Sacred Heart	2

Note: * denotes overtime period(s)

== Results ==
Note: All game times are local.

=== First Round ===
==== (7) Canisius vs. (10) Mercyhurst ====
March 3, 2026; 6:00 pm	Canisius	2–5 (1–2, 0–1, 1–2)	Mercyhurst	LECOM Harborcenter; Attendance: 452

Game reference

Chase Clark
Goalies
Charles-Edward Gravel

	0–1	8:50 – Brooks (3) (James, Sambrook)
	0–2	14:15 – PP – Coughlin (5) (Bartecko, James)
(Miller, Kincaid) Price (8) – 15:20	1–2
	1–3	24:59 – James (7) (DesRochers, Iasenza)
(Porter, Chiddenton) Zacher (19) – PP – 50:54	2–3
	2–4	58:02 – EN – Fitzgerald (4) (Coughlin)
	2–5	59:23 – EN – Kocsis (5) (Lamb, Brooks)

4 min
Penalties
12 min
49
Shots
13

==== (8) Niagara vs. (9) Army ====
March 3, 2026; 7:00 pm	Niagara	5–4 (3–0, 0–3, 2–1)	Army	Dwyer Arena; Attendance: 323

Game reference

Deivs Rolovs
Goalies
JJ Cataldo
Referees:
Ronald Morello
Matthewe Terreri
Linesmen:
Joe Sherman
James Rogowsky

Finnie (11) (Murakami, Muranov) – 2:42	1–0
Jacob Maillet (8) (Murakami, Melin) – 6:34	2–0
Finnie (12) (Young, Muranov) – 15:44	3–0
	3–1	28:04 – Ivey (13) (Forselius, Woodring)
	3–2	29:08 – Wegner (2) (Batten)
	3–3	33:55 – Ivey (14) (Chapman, Forselius)
	3–4	50:08 – Hong (11) (Cataldo)
Nicholas Niemo (3) (Prohorenkovs) – 50:22	4–4
Hackett (12) (Finnie, Oickle) – PP – 52:55	5–4

8 min
Penalties
8 min
27
Shots
35

=== Quarterfinals ===
==== (1) Bentley vs. (10) Mercyhurst ====
March 6, 2026; 7:00 pm	Bentley	4–3 (3OT) (1–2, 2–0, 0–1, 0–0, 0–0, 1–0)	Mercyhurst	Bentley Arena; Attendance: 1,184

Game reference

Lukas Swedin
Goalies
Charles-Edward Gravel
Referees:
Jared Waitt
Matthew Fuller
Linesmen:
Conor Foley
Adam Drexel

	0–1	4:19 – Christian Kocsis (Leblanc, LeBlanc)
	0–2	10:20 – Jacob Leblanc (1) (James, Dimitriadis)
(Black, Hjartarson) Michael Mesic (11) – 16:47	1–2
(Dalton) Jake Black (17) – PP – 22:12	2–2
(Mesic, Black) Alec Leonard (5) – 35:03	3–2
	3–3	53:07 – PP – Brendan Lamb (7) (Iasenza, DesRochers)
(Hjartarson) Jake Black (18) – 106:43	4–3

8 min
Penalties
6 min
69
Shots
26

March 7, 2026; 6:00 pm	Bentley	6–0 (2–0, 2–0, 2–0)	Mercyhurst	Bentley Arena; Attendance: 1,110

Game reference

Lukas Swedin
Goalies
Salvatore Evola
Referees:
Jared Waitt
Matthew Fuller
Linesmen:
Conor Foley
Adam Drexel

(Gaspar, Leonard) David Helledy (4) – 4:34	1–0
(Castagna, Helledy) Kellan Hjartarson (8) – 9:16	2–0
(Upson, Salo) Chase Davis (7) – 28:54	3–0
(Castagna, Hjartarson) Jake Black (19) – PP – 30:43	4–0
(Bakkevig, Nemes) David Helledy (5) – 44:16	5–0
(Nemes) Arlo Merritt (6) – 51:53	6–0

4 min
Penalties
4 min
40
Shots
14

Bentley wins series 2–0

==== (2) Sacred Heart vs. (8) Niagara ====
March 6, 2026; 7:00 pm	Sacred Heart	3–1 (1–0, 1–1, 1–0)	Niagara	Martire Family Arena; Attendance: 1,374

Game reference

Ajeet Gundarah
Goalies
Deivs Rolovs
Referees:
Kevin McManus
Brendan Blanchard
Linesmen:
Dylan Lewis
Robert Peterkin

(Bryant, Trudeau) Reid Pabich (12) – PP – 15:22	1–0
	1–1	21:44 – Dallon Melin (4) (McDonnell, Maillet)
(Lesakowski, Rubin) Vitaly Levyy (17) – GW – 35:46	2–1
(VanRooyan, Joughin) Félix Trudeau (24) – EN – 57:51	3–1

10 min
Penalties
6 min
30
Shots
30

March 7, 2026; 5:00 pm	Sacred Heart	2–1 (0–0, 1–1, 1–0)	Niagara	Martire Family Arena; Attendance: 1,613

Game reference

Ajeet Gundarah
Goalies
Deivs Rolovs
Referees:
Kevin McManus
Brendan Blanchard
Linesmen:
Dylan Lewis
Robert Peterkin

(unassisted) Paul Minnehan (2) – 22:34	1–0
	1–1	28:51 – PP – Dallon Melin (4) (Oickle, Young)
(Bongo, Huard) Vitaly Levyy (17) – GW – 50:44	2–1

6 min
Penalties
6 min
30
Shots
24

Sacred Heart wins series 2–0

==== (3) Robert Morris vs. (6) Air Force ====
March 6, 2026; 7:05 pm	Robert Morris	2–3 (2OT) (0–1, 0–1, 2–0, 0–0, 0–1)	Air Force	Clearview Arena; Attendance: 952

Game reference

Charlie Schenkel
Goalies
Dominik Wasik
Referees:
Mark Duggan
Billy McGoldrick
Linesmen:
Austin March
Joe Gladnick

	0–1	15:29 – Will Staring (6) (Peterson, Yu)
	0–2	29:52 – Mason McCormick (7) (unassisted)
(Reineke, Babcock) Tanner Klimpke (13) – 54:08	1–2
(Craig, Reineke) Tanner Klimpke (14) – EA – 58:20	2–2
	2–3	86:40 – GW PP – Nick Sajevic (14) (Cunningham, Hedden)

14 min
Penalties
12 min
40
Shots
51

March 7, 2026; 7:05 pm	Robert Morris	4–1 (2–0, 2–0, 0–1)	Air Force	Clearview Arena; Attendance: 853

Game reference

Charlie Schenkel
Goalies
Dominik Wasik (out 40:00)
Carter Clafton (in 40:00)
Referees:
Mark Duggan
Billy McGoldrick
Linesmen:
Austin March
Joe Gladnick

(Wilson, Babcock) Julian Beaumont (5) – 2:48	1–0
(Reineke, Klimpke) Dario Beljo (1) – GW – 3:36	2–0
(Craig, Reineke) Patrick Johnson (5) – 29:44	3–0
(Reineke, Craig) Luke van Why (3) – 37:50	4–0
	4–1	41:36 – Chris Hedden (12) (Nichol)

6 min
Penalties
8 min
31
Shots
34

March 8, 2026; 7:05 pm	Robert Morris	5–2 (1–0, 2–0, 2–2)	Air Force	Clearview Arena; Attendance: 814

Game reference

Charlie Schenkel
Goalies
Dominik Wasik
Referees:
Mark Duggan
Billy McGoldrick
Linesmen:
Austin March
Joe Gladnick

(Reineke, Krotiris) Max Wattvil (1) – 13:42	1–0
(Elliott, van Why) Ryan Taylor (5) – 35:25	2–0
(Beaumont, Wilson) Michael Felsing (7) – GW – 39:49	3–0
	3–1	45:29 – Jake Peterson (12) (Willis, Oliphant)
	3–2	48:19 – Owen Dubois (2) (Genest, Houge)
(Johnson) Michael Felsing (8) – 52:44	4–2
(Garvey, Elliott) John Babcock (4) – EN – 55:42	5–2

10 min
Penalties
31 min
17
Shots
62

Robert Morris wins series 2–1

==== (4) Holy Cross vs. (5) RIT ====
March 6, 2026; 7:00 pm	Holy Cross	2–1 (OT) (0–0, 0–0, 1–1, 1–0)	RIT	Hart Center; Attendance: 988

Game reference

Danick Leroux
Goalies
Jakub Krbecek
Referees:
Anthony Kenney
Christopher Leavitt
Linesmen:
Cameron Carlson
Patrick Philbin

	0–1	42:24 – PP – Zach Wigle (8) (Catalano, Lapointe)
(Gagno, Heinke) Noah Eyre (8) – PP EA – 59:08	1–1
(Phillips, Stockfish) William Elias (2) – GW – 69:06	2–1

6 min
Penalties
10 min
44
Shots
34

March 7, 2026; 7:00 pm	Holy Cross	5–4 (OT) (0–0, 4–1, 0–3, 1–0)	RIT	Hart Center; Attendance: 1,092

Game reference

Danick Leroux
Goalies
Jakub Krbecek
Referees:
Anthony Kenney
Christopher Leavitt
Linesmen:
Cameron Carlson
Patrick Philbin

(Stockfish, Oliphant) Devin Phillips (6) – PP – 22:53	1–0
(Abgrall, Elias) Connor Welsh (8) – 23:11	2–0
	2–1	36:16 – Ty Whyte (3) (Williams, Scott)
(Oliphant, Kursonis) David Hymovitch (4) – 39:17	3–1
(Phillips, Gagno) Jack Stockfish (13) – 39:51	4–1
	4–2	46:38 – Will Moore (11) (Scott, Allen)
	4–3	48:15 – Austin Brimmer (9) (Wigle, Konyen)
	4–4	59:29 – EA – Austin Brimmer (8) (Lapointe)
(Phillips, McCall) Jack Stockfish (14) – GW – 64:06	5–4

12 min
Penalties
10 min
24
Shots
37

Holy Cross wins series 2–0

=== Semifinals ===
==== (1) Bentley vs. (4) Holy Cross ====
March 13, 2026; 7:00 pm	Bentley	3–2 (OT) (0–0, 0–1, 2–1, 1–0)	Holy Cross	Bentley Arena; Attendance: 1,466

Game reference

Lukas Swedin
Goalies
Danick Leroux
Referees:
Christopher Leavitt
Andrew Bethmann
Linesmen:
Cameron Carlson
Conor Foley

	0–1	37:32 – Matthew Kursonis (DeBoer, Welsh)
(Hjartarson) Michael Mesic (12) – PP – 40:20	1–1
	1–2	54:06 – Brody Gagno (2) (Welsh)
(Dalton, Helledy) Michael Mesic (13) – EA – 59:07	2–2
(Helledy) Owen Goodbrand (10) – GW – 76:32	3–2

6 min
Penalties
8 min
39
Shots
25

March 14, 2026; 6:00 pm	Bentley	4–0 (1–0, 1–0, 2–0)	Holy Cross	Bentley Arena; Attendance: 1,688

Game reference

Lukas Swedin
Goalies
Danick Leroux
Referees:
Christopher Leavitt
Andrew Bethmann
Linesmen:
Cameron Carlson
Conor Foley

(Bakkevig, Leonard) Owen Goodbrand (11) – GW – 09:36	1–0
(Larsen, Salo) Ryan Upson (2) – 24:56	2–0
(Leonard, Cameron) Michael Mesic (14) – EN – 57:27	3–0
(Castagna, Helledy) Owen Goodbrand (12) – 57:56	4–0

4 min
Penalties
8 min
30
Shots
23

Bentley wins series 2–0

==== (2) Sacred Heart vs. (3) Robert Morris ====
March 13, 2026; 7:00 pm	Sacred Heart	5–1 (0–1, 3–0, 2–0)	Robert Morris	Martire Family Arena; Attendance: 2,519

Game reference

Ajeet Gundarah
Goalies
Charlie Schenkel (out 51:09)
Lucas Massie (in 51:09)
Referees:
Bill McGoldrick
Brendan Blanchard
Linesmen:
Joe Sherman
Patrick Philbin

	0–1	7:08 – Ryan Taylor (Krotiris, Babcock)
(Pabich, VanRooyan) Marcus Joughin (6) – 20:37	1–1
(Trudeau, Joughin) Noah Ellis (9) – GW – 21:41	2–1
(unassisted) Jack Hillier (1) – 29:59	3–1
(Ellis, Huard) Vitaly Levyy (7) – 42:07	4–1
(VanRooyan) Reid Pabich (13) – 49:22	5–1

2 min
Penalties
17 min
35
Shots
24

March 14, 2026; 5:00 pm	Sacred Heart	2–5 (1–0, 1–3, 0–2)	Robert Morris	Martire Family Arena; Attendance: 3,156

Game reference

Ajeet Gundarah
Goalies
Charlie Schenkel
Referees:
Bill McGoldrick
Brendan Blanchard
Linesmen:
Joe Sherman
Patrick Philbin

(Pabich, Adamson) Félix Trudeau (25) – PP – 5:10	1–0
	1–1	21:37 – Tanner Klimpke (15) (Taylor, Garvey)
	1–2	31:14 – Cameron Garvey (10) (Craig, van Why)
	1–3	34:53 – GW – Tanner Klimpke (16) (Taylor, Wattvil)
(Lesakowski, Trudeau) Marcus Joughin (7) – 36:22	2–3
	2–4	41:19 – Cameron Garvey (unassisted)
	2–5	57:03 – EN – Julian Beaumont (Reineke)

2 min
Penalties
4 min
23
Shots
27

March 15, 2026; 5:00 pm	Sacred Heart	5–0 (3–0, 0–0, 2–0)	Robert Morris	Martire Family Arena; Attendance: 2,610

Game reference

Ajeet Gundarah
Goalies
Charlie Schenkel
Referees:
Bill McGoldrick
Brendan Blanchard
Linesmen:
Joe Sherman
Patrick Philbin

(Adamson, Bryant) Marcus Joughin (8) – GW PP – 6:10	1–0
(Trudeau, Joughin) Reid Pabich (14) – 15:21	2–0
(Bryant, Hillier) Michael Rubin (2) – 17:28	3–0
(Bryant, Joughin) Reid Pabich (15) – PP – 44:16	4–0
(Pabich) Michael Rubin (3) – EN – 55:09	5–0

8 min
Penalties
6 min
21
Shots
36

Sacred Heart wins series 2–1

=== Championship ===
==== (1) Bentley vs. (2) Sacred Heart ====
March 21, 2026; 7:00 pm	Bentley	3–2 (0–0, 1–2, 2–0)	Sacred Heart	Bentley Arena; Attendance: 2,500

Game reference

Lukas Swedin
Goalies
Ajeet Gundarah
Referees:
Brendan Blanchard
Christopher Leavitt
Linesmen:
Patrick Philbin
Conor Foley

(Black, Hjartarson) Michael Mesic (15) – 22:43	1–0
	1–1	25:59 – Vitaly Levyy (8) (Adamson, Huard)
	1–2	35:15 – PP – Gavin Bryant (10) (Adamson, Trudeau)
(Mesic, Helledy) Kellan Hjartarson (9) – 43:12	2–2
(Mesic) Kellan Hjartarson (10) – GW – 52:47	3–2

2 min
Penalties
2 min
35
Shots
26

== Tournament awards ==
=== All-Tournament Team ===
- F: Michael Mesic* (Bentley)
- F: Marcus Joughin (Sacred Heart)
- F: Kellan Hjartarson (Bentley)
- D: David Helledy (Bentley)
- D: John Babcock (Robert Morris)
- G: Lukas Swedein (Bentley)

* Most Outstanding Player(s)
