= Andy Jones (ice hockey) =

American ice hockey player (born 1978)

Current position
- Title: Head coach
- Team: Bentley
- Conference: Atlantic Hockey America

Biographical details
- Born: April 19, 1978 (age 48); Excelsior, Minnesota, USA
- Education: Amherst College

Playing career
- 1996–2000: Amherst
- Position: Defenseman

Coaching career (HC unless noted)
- 2000–2005: Amherst (asst.)
- 2006–2011: Sioux Falls Stampede (asst.)
- 2009: USA U19 (asst.)
- 2011–2015: Clarkson (asst.)
- 2015–2023: Massachusetts Lowell (asst.)
- 2023–Present: Bentley

Head coaching record
- Overall: 39–35–4 (.526)
- Tournaments: 0–1 (.000)

Accomplishments and honors

Championships
- 2025 AHA tournament

Awards
- Atlantic Hockey America Coach of the Year (2026)

Andrew Jones is an American ice hockey coach and former player. He was named as the head coach for the Bentley Falcons on June 28, 2023.

== Career ==
A native of Excelsior, Minnesota, Jones travelled east to attend Amherst College. While there he played on both the baseball and ice hockey teams. He was named team captain in his senior season and led the program to its first ever NCAA tournament appearance. He graduated with a B.A. in psychology in 2000 and remained at the school as an assistant coach with the hockey team while also earning an MBA. In 2005, after 9 years in Amherst, Jones left the college ranks and later became an assistant coach with the Sioux Falls Stampede. In his first season with the Stampede, he helped the team win its first Clark Cup. During his five-year stint in Sioux Falls, he also served as an assistant for the United States Under-19 team at the World Junior A Challenge in 2009, winning a gold medal.

Jones returned to college in 2011, becoming an assistant at Clarkson under new head coach Casey Jones (no relation). In 2014, he helped the Golden Knights revive their program by posting its first winning season in seven years. He transitioned into a similar role with Massachusetts Lowell in 2015 and remained in that position for 8 seasons. During that time he worked primarily with the defense and penalty kill and was heavily involved with player development. During his time in Lowell, the River Hawks posted winning recorded in all but one year and made three NCAA tournament appearances. UMass Lowell was also routinely one of the top defensive teams in Hockey East.

In 2023, Jones was named as the 7th head coach for Bentley, taking over from long-time bench boss Ryan Soderquist.

== Career statistics ==
			Regular season					Playoffs
Season	Team	League	GP	G	A	Pts	PIM	GP	G	A	Pts	PIM
1996–97	Amherst	ECAC East	25	2	10	12	14	—	—	—	—	—
1997–98	Amherst	ECAC East	23	1	7	8	4	—	—	—	—	—
1998–99	Amherst	ECAC East	—	—	—	—	—	—	—	—	—	—
1999–00	Amherst	ECAC East	24	2	9	11	16	—	—	—	—	—

== Head coaching record ==
Record table
Season	Team	Overall	Conference	Standing	Postseason
Bentley Falcons (Atlantic Hockey) (2023–2024)
2023–24	Bentley	16–17–2	12–12–2	T–6th	Atlantic Hockey First Round
Bentley Falcons (AHA) (2024–present)
2024–25	Bentley	23–15–2	16–9–1	3rd	NCAA Manchester Regional Semifinal
2025–26	Bentley	0–3–0	0–0–0		
Bentley:		39–35–4	28–21–3		
Total:		39–35–4			
National champion Postseason invitational champion Conference regular season champion Conference regular season and conference tournament champion Division regular season champion Division regular season and conference tournament champion Conference tournament champion

Awards and achievements
Preceded by Bill Riga	Atlantic Hockey America men's Coach of the Year; 2025–26	Succeeded by Incumbent
