= Bentley Falcons men's ice hockey =

- Current season
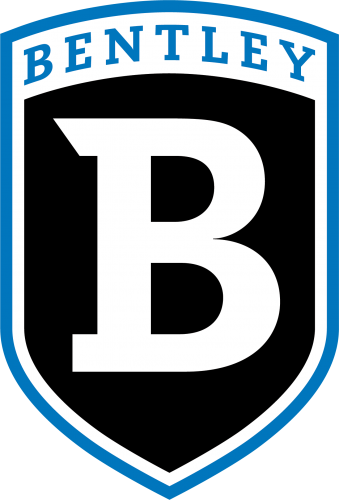
- University: Bentley University
- Conference: AHA
- First season: 1977–78
- Head coach: Andy Jones; 3rd season, 39–32–4 (.547)
- Assistant coaches: Tom Fiorentino; Riley Colvard
- Arena: Bentley Arena; Waltham, Massachusetts
- Colors: Blue and white
- Mascot: Flex the Falcon

NCAA tournament appearances
- 2025, 2026

Conference tournament champions
- ECAC Northeast: 1980, 1981; AHA: 2025, 2026

Conference regular season champions
- ECAC Northeast: 1981, 1997; AHA: 2026

The Bentley Falcons men's ice hockey team is a National Collegiate Athletic Association (NCAA) Division I college ice hockey program that represents Bentley University in Waltham, Massachusetts. The Falcons are members of Atlantic Hockey America, formed shortly after the 2023–24 season by the merger of their previous conference, the Atlantic Hockey Association, with College Hockey America (CHA). Bentley had been an original member of the Association. The Falcons play their home games at the Bentley Arena on the school's campus in Waltham, Massachusetts, having moved into the new, on-campus arena in February 2018. The Falcons are coached by Andy Jones.

As of 2026 with AIC dropping down to d2 and Mercyhurst dropping men's ice hockey. Bentley is the last d2 school in northeast that sponsors hockey in Division 1.

== History ==
Hockey at Bentley began as a modest club team organized by students in the mid-1960s. Bentley Hall of Famer Reg Pearless was the first captain. The team gained official varsity status beginning with the 1977–78 season, and claimed consecutive ECAC 3 championships in 1980 and 1981.

The program made a provisional move to Division I for the 1998–99 season, and became a full Division I member for the following season, being a member of the MAAC. The Falcons then became one of the founding members of the Atlantic Hockey Association when the league was founded for the 2003–04 season, as well as founding members of Atlantic Hockey America when the Association and CHA merged.

The team played its home games at the John A. Ryan Arena in Watertown from 1977 to 2018, before they moved into their new, on-campus home, Bentley Arena in February 2018.

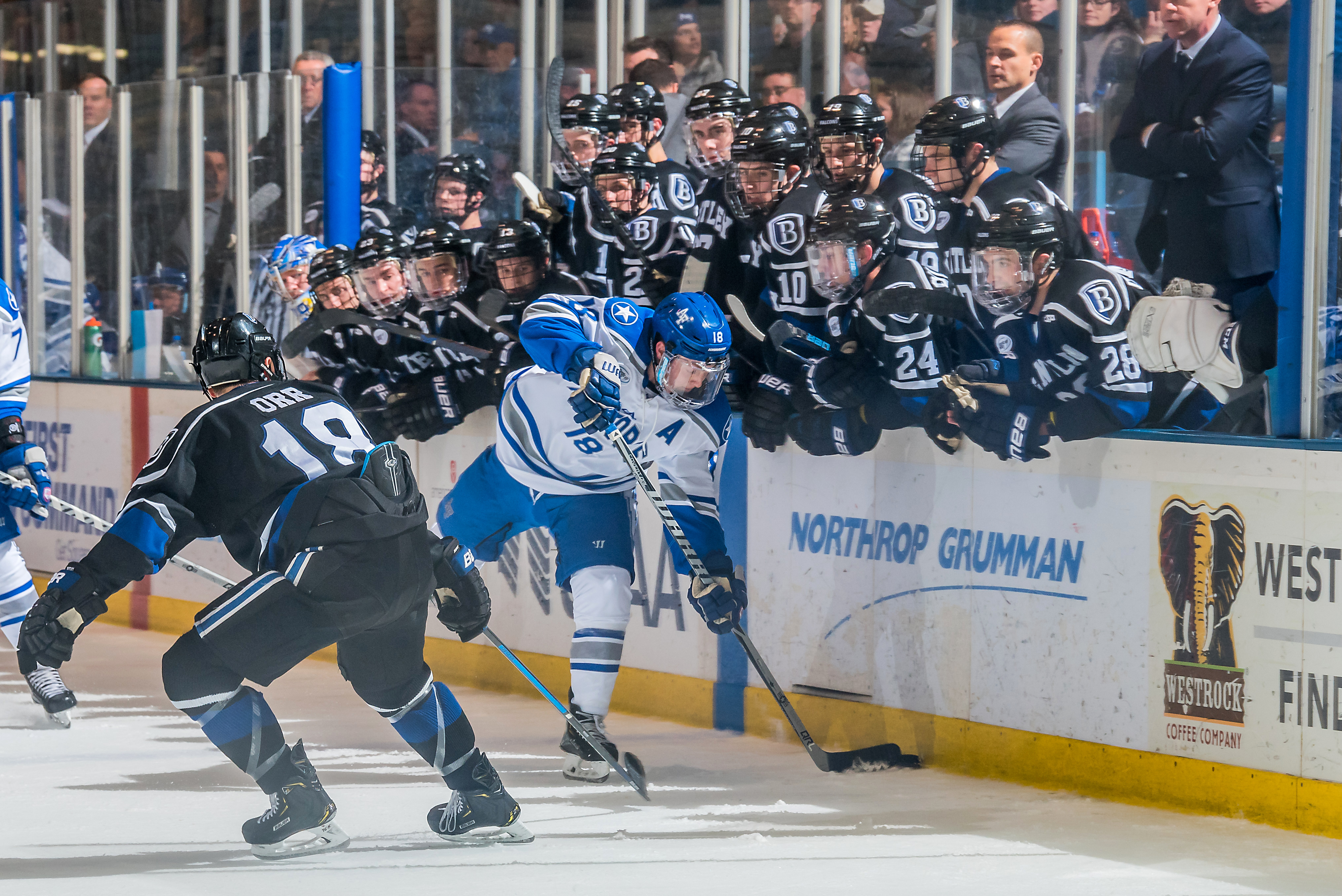
A game between Bentley and Air Force in 2019

== All-time coaching records ==
As of the completion of 2024–25 season

Tenure	Coach	Years	Record	Pct.
1977–1980	Joe Quinn	3	32–26–0	.552
1980–1984	Tim Flynn	4	56–32–2	.633
1984–1985	Mark Canavan	1	5–15–0	.250
1985–1993	Tom Aprille	8	69–107–8	.397
1993–2002	Jim McAdam	9	101–134–16	.434
2002–2023	Ryan Soderquist	21	277–377–85	.432
2023–Present	Andy Jones	2	39–32–4	.547
Totals	7 coaches	48 seasons	579–723–115	.449

== Statistical leaders ==
=== Career points leaders ===
Player	Years	GP	G	A	Pts	PIM
Ryan Soderquist	1996–2000	99	84	89	173	
Brett Gensler	2010–2014	145	73	94	167	
Andrew Gladiuk	2012–2016	144	72	81	153	
John Maguire	1980–1984		58	91	149	
Max French	2013–2017	138	67	76	143	
Gary See	1979–1983		52	89	141	
Alex Grieve	2011–2015	139	55	73	128	
Dain Prewitt	2005–2009	145	60	66	126	
Shawn Smith	1995–1999		52	74	126	
Brian Gangemi	1997–2000		56	65	121	
Joe Maguire	1977–1981		65	56	121	

=== Career goaltending leaders ===
GP = Games played; Min = Minutes played; W = Wins; L = Losses; T = Ties; GA = Goals against; SO = Shutouts; SV% = Save percentage; GAA = Goals against average

Minimum 40 games

Player	Years	GP	Min	W	L	T	GA	SO	SV%	GAA
Connor Hasley	2022–2025	77	4516	37	32	5	171	14	.915	2.27
Branden Komm	2010–2014	115	6658	47	50	13	296	5	.919	2.67
Aidan Pelino	2016–2020	99	5544	39	43	10	251	4	.905	2.72
Jayson Argue	2014–2018	80	4517	24	36	15	210	2	.913	2.79
Gabe Antoni	2012–2016	43	2184	17	17	5	105	1	.911	2.88

Statistics current through the end of the 2024–25 season.

== Roster ==
As of August 11, 2025

No.	Nat.	Player	Class	Pos	Height	Weight	DoB	Hometown	Previous team	NHL rights
1	(United States)	Jack Erickson	Freshman	G	6' 1" (1.85 m)	174 lb (79 kg)	2004-09-28	White Bear Lake, Minnesota	Colorado Grit (NAHL)	—
2	(United States)	David Helledy	Sophomore	D	6' 0" (1.83 m)	181 lb (82 kg)	2003-05-04	Milwaukee, Wisconsin	Maine Nordiques (NAHL)	—
4	(Norway)	Tobias Bjercke Larsen	Sophomore	D	6' 2" (1.88 m)	207 lb (94 kg)	2004-08-27	Oslo, Norway	American International (AHA)	—
5	(United States)	Dylan Cook	Sophomore	F	6' 0" (1.83 m)	190 lb (86 kg)	2003-03-02	Princeton, Minnesota	Massachusetts Lowell (HEA)	—
6	(Canada)	Seth Bernard-Docker	Senior	D	6' 0" (1.83 m)	190 lb (86 kg)	2001-10-30	Canmore, Alberta	Sioux Falls Stampede (USHL)	—
7	(Canada)	Alec Leonard	Freshman	D	5' 11" (1.8 m)	174 lb (79 kg)	2004-05-13	Toronto, Ontario	Owen Sound Attack (OHL)	—
8	(Finland)	Oliver Salo	Sophomore	F	6' 1" (1.85 m)	190 lb (86 kg)	2003-07-09	Kaarina, Finland	Anchorage Wolverines (NAHL)	—
9	(United States)	Jake Black	Senior	D	5' 11" (1.8 m)	180 lb (82 kg)	2002-03-05	Pomfret, Connecticut	Connecticut (HEA)	—
10	(United States)	Jimmy Doyle	Junior	F	6' 2" (1.88 m)	190 lb (86 kg)	2002-04-02	Plainfield, Illinois	Janesville Jets (NAHL)	—
11	(Canada)	Ryan Mansfield	Junior	F	5' 11" (1.8 m)	195 lb (88 kg)	2002-12-22	Burlington, Ontario	Odessa Jackalopes (NAHL)	—
12	(Canada)	Owen Goodbrand	Freshman	F	6' 2" (1.88 m)	181 lb (82 kg)	2004-04-02	Waterdown, Ontario	Prince George Spruce Kings (BCHL)	—
13	(United States)	Peter Kramer	Junior	F	5' 11" (1.8 m)	185 lb (84 kg)	2002-08-08	Bridgewater, Massachusetts	Green Bay Gamblers (USHL)	—
14	(United States)	Pat Lawn	Senior	D	6' 0" (1.83 m)	175 lb (79 kg)	2001-03-26	Waltham, Massachusetts	West Kelowna Warriors (BCHL)	—
15	(Norway)	Oskar Kind Bakkevig	Sophomore	F	5' 11" (1.8 m)	183 lb (83 kg)	2004-07-24	Oslo, Norway	Malmö Redhawks J20 (J20 Nationell)	—
16	(Canada)	Kellan Hjartarson	Junior	F	5' 11" (1.8 m)	175 lb (79 kg)	2003-02-23	Calgary, Alberta	Cranbrook Bucks (BCHL)	—
17	(Canada)	Stephen Castagna	Senior	F	5' 9" (1.75 m)	170 lb (77 kg)	2001-08-06	North Vancouver, British Columbia	Alberni Valley Bulldogs (BCHL)	—
18	(Canada)	Arlo Merritt	Senior	F	6' 3" (1.91 m)	215 lb (98 kg)	2001-01-31	Halifax, Nova Scotia	Alberni Valley Bulldogs (BCHL)	—
19	(United States)	Michael Mesic	Sophomore	F	5' 9" (1.75 m)	180 lb (82 kg)	2004-08-15	Plymouth, Michigan	Youngstown Phantoms (USHL)	—
20	(Czech Republic)	Jan Gaspar	Freshman	F	5' 10" (1.78 m)	174 lb (79 kg)	2004-10-18	Prague, Czech Republic	Bismarck Bobcats (NAHL)	—
21	(United States)	Jack Dalton	Junior	D	6' 0" (1.83 m)	174 lb (79 kg)	2003-07-22	River Forest, Illinois	Maine (HEA)	—
22	(United States)	Chase Davis	Junior	F	6' 4" (1.93 m)	210 lb (95 kg)	2002-04-08	Alpharetta, Georgia	Amarillo Wranglers (NAHL)	—
23	(Hungary)	Márton Nemes	Freshman	F	6' 2" (1.88 m)	198 lb (90 kg)	2005-10-23	Székesfehérvár, Hungary	Mora IK J20 (J20 Nationell)	—
24	(Canada)	Colton Cameron	Junior	D	5' 11" (1.8 m)	190 lb (86 kg)	2002-07-07	Surrey, British Columbia	Prince George Spruce Kings (BCHL)	—
25	(United States)	Garrett Horsager	Junior	D	6' 0" (1.83 m)	180 lb (82 kg)	2002-02-02	Rosemount, Minnesota	Oklahoma Warriors (NAHL)	—
26	(United States)	Kolby Amici	Junior	F	5' 9" (1.75 m)	180 lb (82 kg)	2002-12-16	Orchard Park, New York	Minot Minotauros (NAHL)	—
27	(Canada)	Ryan Nause	Senior	D	5' 11" (1.8 m)	180 lb (82 kg)	2001-08-27	Riverview, New Brunswick	Alberni Valley Bulldogs (BCHL)	—
28	(United States)	Jack Farrell	Freshman	D	6' 0" (1.83 m)	192 lb (87 kg)	2004-06-10	Wilmington, Massachusetts	West Kelowna Warriors (BCHL)	—
29	(United States)	Nick Bevilacqua	Sophomore	G	6' 0" (1.83 m)	190 lb (86 kg)	2003-08-06	Abington, Massachusetts	P.A.L. Junior Islanders (NCDC)	—
30	(Canada)	Easton Hesse	Senior (RS)	G	6' 0" (1.83 m)	175 lb (79 kg)	2000-06-28	Beaumont, Alberta	Lake Superior State (CCHA)	—
38	(Canada)	Ryan Upson	Senior	F	6' 0" (1.83 m)	190 lb (86 kg)	2001-03-22	West Vancouver, British Columbia	Langley Rivermen (BCHL)	—
60	(Sweden)	Lukas Swedin	Freshman	G	5' 10" (1.78 m)	161 lb (73 kg)	2004-04-16	Stockholm, Sweden	Minot Minotauros (NAHL)	—

== Awards and honors ==
=== Atlantic Hockey America ===
==== Individual awards ====
Best Defensive Forward

- Ethan Leyh (2025)

Most Outstanding Player in Tournament

- Connor Hasley (2025)
- Michael Mesic (2026)

==== All-Conference teams ====
First Team All-Atlantic Hockey America

- 2024–25: Nick Bochen, D; Ethan Leyh, F
- 2025–26: Jake Black, F

Second Team All-Atlantic Hockey America

- 2024–25: Connor Hasley, G

Third Team All-Atlantic Hockey America

- 2025–26: Jack Dalton, F

Atlantic Hockey America All-Rookie Team

- 2025–26: Lukas Swedin, G

Atlantic Hockey America All-Tournament Teams

- 2024–25: Connor Hasley, G; Nick Bochen, D; A. J. Hodges, F; Nik Armstrong-Kingkade, F
- 2025–26: Lukas Swedein, G; David Helledy, D; Michael Mesic, F; Kellan Hjartarson, F

== Uniform ==
The Falcons have undergone a couple of uniform changes since the start of the 2010–2011 season. In accordance with the new Bentley brand, the Falcon's moved away from the white, navy and gold color scheme. The first switch made was to their road uniform. They moved from navy blue, with gold "Bentley" lettering, and white trim to a black uniform with a navy blue B in the middle and white trim. The new home uniforms were unveiled in the 2013–2014 season, and are still their current home uniforms. They are white with the Bentley back and grey B in the middle, navy blue and black trim, and black numbers/names on jerseys on the back. The new home jerseys were unveiled at Frozen Fenway on 12/28/2014. To start the 2014–2015 season, the Falcon's unveiled another new road uniform. This, their current road jersey, is black with navy blue "Bentley" lettering across the front, using white and navy trim with the Bentley crest on the shoulder. Both uniforms use black helmets, and black pants with a navy blue and white trim. For the 2025-2026 season, Bentley donned new uniforms. The black helmets were kept, yet for the home jerseys the "Bentley" on the front was replaced with a black cursive script font. For the road uniform, the jersey reads "Falcons" going diagonally across the jersey in white block font. Both have a Falcon on both shoulders.

== Home arena ==
The Falcons play at Bentley Arena, the program's new, on-campus arena. Ground was broken on the new arena in the summer of 2016, and completed in February 2018. The Falcons played their first game in the new Arena on February 16, against Army West Point.

The 76,000 square foot Bentley Arena was designed by Architectural Resources Cambridge and built by Suffolk Construction. It has a capacity of 2,207 for hockey games.

== Notable alumni ==
- Ryan Soderquist (2000): Soderquist graduated in 2000 with the most career goals (84) and career points (173) in program history. Soderquist also holds the record for most goals in a season, with 33. He has been Bentley's head coach since 2002, leading the team to a 243–300–78 record.
- Brett Gensler (2014): Gensler graduated in 2014 as the program's all-time points leader at the Division I level, behind only Coach Ryan Soderquist. He was responsible for two of the three 50-point seasons in Bentley history, Gensler earned first-team All-Atlantic Hockey honors each of his last three years and was the recipient of the 2012 Walter Brown Award as the top American-born player in New England. He concluded his career with 73 goals (a Bentley Division I record), a school-record 94 assists and 167 points, second most in program history. After completing his Bentley career, Gensler signed with the South Carolina Stingrays of the ECHL.
- Max French (2017): French graduated in 2017, finishing his career as the Falcons' all-time 5th best point scorer and 4th best goal scorer. French was an assistant captain to Andrew Gladiuk in 2015-2016 as a junior and was named captain of the Falcons in his final season. French also earned All-Atlantic Hockey First Team honors in both his junior and senior seasons. During his time at Bentley, French racked up 143 points (67 goals, 76 assists) in 138 career games to join Gensler and Gladiuk as the only Falcons to average over a point per game at the Division I level. Upon completion of his senior season, French was invited to an ATO with the Utica Comets of the AHL, but never found the starting lineup in his short few weeks with the team. On July 12, 2017, the Texas Stars, AHL affiliate of the NHL's Dallas Stars, signed French for the 2017–2018 season. This signing marked the first time a Bentley alum had been signed to a professional contract at the AHL level or above.
- Tanner Jago (2019): Jago finished his Bentley career with the second-most games played in program history, as well as third-most points for a defenseman in program history. In July 2019, he signed with the Texas Stars of the AHL.
- Alexey Solovyev (2019): Solovyev signed with the Providence Bruins of the AHL in July 2019.
